= 1952 College Baseball All-America Team =

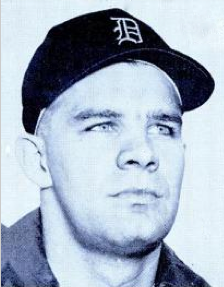
1952 All-Americans included ten-time MLB All Star Harvey Kuenn.

This is a list of college baseball players named first team All-Americans for the 1952 NCAA baseball season. From 1947 to 1963, the American Baseball Coaches Association was the only generally recognized All-America selector, so any player selected by the ABCA is considered a "consensus" All-American.

== Key ==
A	American Baseball Coaches Association
	Member of the National College Baseball Hall of Fame
	Consensus All-American – selected the ABCA

== All-Americans ==
Position	Name	School	#	A	Other awards and honors
Pitcher	Don Boenker	Missouri	1	✓	
Pitcher	James O'Neill	Holy Cross	1	✓	College World Series Most Outstanding Player
Catcher	Larry Isbell	Baylor	1	✓	
First baseman	Billy Werber, Jr.	Duke	1	✓	
Second baseman	Hal Charnofsky	USC	1	✓	
Shortstop	Harvey Kuenn	Wisconsin	1	✓	
Third baseman	Dick Groat	Duke	1	✓	
Outfielder	Tom Keough	California	1	✓	
Outfielder	James Monahan	Rutgers	1	✓	
Outfielder	Junior Wren	Missouri	1	✓	

== See also ==
- List of college baseball awards
