= 1952 Oregon State Beavers baseball team =

American college baseball season

1952 Oregon State Beavers baseball

Pacific Coast Conference champions District VIII champions

College World Series, T-7th
- Conference: Pacific Coast Conference
- Northern
- Record: 27–12 (10–6 PCC)
- Head coach: Ralph Coleman (21st season)
- Assistant coach: Paul Valenti
- Captain: Pete Goodbrod
- Home stadium: Coleman Field

1952 Pacific Coast Conference baseball standings
	Conf.						Overall
Team	W		L		T	PCT	W		L		T	PCT
North Division
Oregon State ‍†‍‍^{y}	10	–	6	–	0	.625	27	–	12	–	0	.692
Washington ‍‍‍	10	–	6	–	0	.625	14	–	9	–	0	.609
Oregon ‍‍‍	9	–	6	–	0	.600	19	–	12	–	0	.613
Washington State ‍‍‍	6	–	10	–	0	.375	19	–	15	–	0	.559
Idaho ‍‍‍	4	–	11	–	0	.267	0	–	0	–	0	–
California Intercollegiate Baseball Association
USC ‍†‍‍	11	–	5	–	0	.688	18	–	9	–	0	.667
Stanford ‍‍‍	9	–	7	–	0	.563	19	–	13	–	1	.591
UCLA ‍‍‍	8	–	8	–	0	.500	21	–	15	–	0	.583
Santa Clara ‍‍‍	7	–	9	–	0	.438	18	–	12	–	0	.600
California ‍‍‍	5	–	11	–	0	.313	21	–	16	–	0	.568
† – Conference champion y – Invited to the NCAA tournament

The 1952 Oregon State Beavers baseball team represented Oregon State College in the 1952 NCAA baseball season. The Beavers played their home games at Coleman Field. The team was coached by Ralph Coleman in his 21st year at Oregon State.

The Beavers won the District VIII playoff to advance to the College World Series, where they were defeated by the Texas Longhorns.

== Roster ==
1952 Oregon State Beavers baseball team
Players
Coaches

#	Pos.	Name	B/T	Height	Weight	Year	Home town
14	RHP	Bud Berg	R/R	6 ft 2 in (1.88 m)	190 lb (86 kg)	Sr	Portland, Oregon
13	RHP	Bailey Brem	R/R	6 ft 3 in (1.91 m)	185 lb (84 kg)	Jr	Portland, Oregon
	INF	Jack Bowen	R/R	5 ft 10 in (1.78 m)	172 lb (78 kg)	Fr	Nyssa, Oregon
3	INF	Bobby Buob	R/R	5 ft 8 in (1.73 m)	158 lb (72 kg)	Fr	Union, New Jersey
	LHP	Ralph Coleman	L/L	6 ft 0 in (1.83 m)	155 lb (70 kg)	Jr	Corvallis, Oregon
17	INF	Jay Dean	R/L	6 ft 5 in (1.96 m)	210 lb (95 kg)	Fr	Nampa, Idaho
	INF	Mel Ediger	R/R	6 ft 0 in (1.83 m)	175 lb (79 kg)	So	Dallas, Oregon
5	INF	Chuck Fisk	R/R	6 ft 0 in (1.83 m)	170 lb (77 kg)	Fr	Portland, Oregon
16	RHP	Alex Goedhard	R/R	6 ft 2 in (1.88 m)	175 lb (79 kg)	Sr	Pasadena, California
8	OF	Pete Goodbrod (C)	L/R	5 ft 10 in (1.78 m)	160 lb (73 kg)	Sr	Salem, Oregon
7	OF	Dwane Helbig	R/R	6 ft 0 in (1.83 m)	195 lb (88 kg)	So	Portland, Oregon
	INF	Connie Holzgang	R/R	5 ft 11 in (1.8 m)	160 lb (73 kg)	So	Medford, Oregon
2	RHP	Don Hopp	R/R	6 ft 2 in (1.88 m)	175 lb (79 kg)	Fr	Oregon City, Oregon
10	INF	Cub Houck	R/R	6 ft 0 in (1.83 m)	185 lb (84 kg)	Sr	Salem, Oregon
	OF	Jim Jenks	R/R	6 ft 0 in (1.83 m)	168 lb (76 kg)	Jr	Albany, Oregon
4	INF	Danny Johnston	R/R	5 ft 11 in (1.8 m)	175 lb (79 kg)	Jr	Whittier, California
	OF	Ralph Krafve	L/R	6 ft 2 in (1.88 m)	185 lb (84 kg)	Sr	Portland, Oregon
12	OF	Ed Nelson	R/R	5 ft 10 in (1.78 m)	165 lb (75 kg)	Sr	Corvallis, Oregon
	LHP	Jim Nierman	R/L	6 ft 0 in (1.83 m)	175 lb (79 kg)	So	Hillsboro, Oregon
	OF	Jack Pinion	R/R	5 ft 10 in (1.78 m)	195 lb (88 kg)	So	Reedsport, Oregon
	INF	Johnny Rearden	R/R	5 ft 11 in (1.8 m)	160 lb (73 kg)	Sr	Corvallis, Oregon
15	INF	Jim Ruggles	L/R	6 ft 0 in (1.83 m)	170 lb (77 kg)	Fr	Portland, Oregon
18	OF	Bud Shirtcliff	R/R	6 ft 3 in (1.91 m)	200 lb (91 kg)	Jr	Myrtle Creek, Oregon
	C	Jack Smith	R/R	5 ft 10 in (1.78 m)	180 lb (82 kg)	So	Ontario, Oregon
11	C	Jack Stephenson	R/R	5 ft 11 in (1.8 m)	172 lb (78 kg)	Fr	Tigard, Oregon
	OF	Bob Thoman	R/R	6 ft 4 in (1.93 m)	175 lb (79 kg)	Jr	Corvallis, Oregon
19	C	John Thomas	R/R	6 ft 3 in (1.91 m)	215 lb (98 kg)	Sr	Newark, New Jersey
	C	Bill Turner	R/R	5 ft 9 in (1.75 m)	175 lb (79 kg)	Jr	Portland, Oregon
	INF	Jim Walker	L/L	5 ft 10 in (1.78 m)	155 lb (70 kg)	So	Long Beach, California
20	RHP	Norb Wellman	R/R	6 ft 4 in (1.93 m)	205 lb (93 kg)	So	Mt. Angel, Oregon
	LHP	Don White	R/L	6 ft 1 in (1.85 m)	160 lb (73 kg)	Sr	Portland, Oregon
	OF	Dick Wilson	L/L	5 ft 11 in (1.8 m)	165 lb (75 kg)	Fr	Nyssa, Oregon
	OF	Jim Withrow	R/R	5 ft 10 in (1.78 m)	160 lb (73 kg)	Fr	Van Nuys, California
	INF	Doug Wray	R/R	5 ft 9 in (1.75 m)	150 lb (68 kg)	Fr	The Dalles, Oregon

Head coach

Ralph Coleman

Assistant coach(es)

Paul Valenti

Legend

- (C) Team captain
- (S) Suspended
- (I) Ineligible
- Injured
- Current redshirt

Roster
Last update: November 26, 2020

== Schedule ==
1952 Oregon State Beavers baseball game log
Regular season
Regular Season (23–10)

#	Date	Opponent	Site/stadium	Score	Overall record	PCC record
1		Pacific	Coleman Field • Corvallis, Oregon	22–5	1–0	–
2		Linfield	Coleman Field • Corvallis, Oregon	5–0	2–0	–
3		Linfield	Coleman Field • Corvallis, Oregon	6–0	3–0	–
4		Vanport	Coleman Field • Corvallis, Oregon	16–3	4–0	–
5		Willamette	Coleman Field • Corvallis, Oregon	8–4	5–0	–
6		at Oregon	Howe Field • Eugene, Oregon	4–1	6–0	1–0
7		Lewis & Clark	Coleman Field • Corvallis, Oregon	4–2	7–0	1–0
8		Lewis & Clark	Coleman Field • Corvallis, Oregon	2–3	7–1	1–0
9		Portland	Coleman Field • Corvallis, Oregon	5–3	8–1	1–0
10		at Pacific (OR)	Unknown • Newburg, Oregon	16–4	9–1	1–0
11		at Linfield	Unknown • McMinnville, Oregon	4–5	9–2	1–0
12		Oregon	Coleman Field • Corvallis, Oregon	5–12	9–3	1–1
13		at Lewis & Clark	Harris Field • Lewiston, Idaho	10–4	10–3	1–1
14		Linfield	Coleman Field • Corvallis, Oregon	5–1	11–3	1–1
15		Linfield	Coleman Field • Corvallis, Oregon	22–5	12–3	1–1
16		Washington State	Coleman Field • Corvallis, Oregon	9–2	13–3	2–1
17		Washington State	Coleman Field • Corvallis, Oregon	3–9	13–4	2–2
18		at Portland	Unknown • Portland, Oregon	19–8	14–4	2–2
19		Idaho	Coleman Field • Corvallis, Oregon	15–16	14–5	2–3
20		Idaho	Coleman Field • Corvallis, Oregon	7–4	15–5	3–3
21		Washington	Coleman Field • Corvallis, Oregon	7–1	16–5	4–3
22		Washington	Coleman Field • Corvallis, Oregon	10–8	17–5	5–3
23		at Idaho	MacLean Field • Moscow, Idaho	16–5	18–5	6–3
24		at Idaho	MacLean Field • Moscow, Idaho	3–1	19–5	7–3
25		at Washington State	Bailey Field • Pullman, Washington	3–5	19–6	7–4
26		at Washington State	Bailey Field • Pullman, Washington	6–5	20–6	8–4
27		at Washington	Old Graves Field • Seattle, Washington	6–2	21–6	9–4
28		at Washington	Old Graves Field • Seattle, Washington	6–10	21–7	9–5
29		Seattle	Coleman Field • Corvallis, Oregon	6–8	21–8	9–5
30		Oregon	Coleman Field • Corvallis, Oregon	3–1	22–8	10–5
31		at Oregon	Howe Field • Eugene, Oregon	13–14	22–9	10–6
32		Oregon	Coleman Field • Corvallis, Oregon	7–6	23–9	10–6
33		at Oregon	Howe Field • Eugene, Oregon	5–18	23–10	10–6

Postseason
Pacific Coast Conference Playoff (2–0)

#	Date	Opponent	Site/stadium	Score	Overall record	PCC record
34	May 30	Southern California	Coleman Field • Corvallis, Oregon	12–10	24–10	10–6
35	May 31	Southern California	Coleman Field • Corvallis, Oregon	5–4	25–10	10–6

District VIII Playoff (2–0)

#	Date	Opponent	Site/stadium	Score	Overall record	PCC record
36	June 6	Fresno State	Coleman Field • Corvallis, Oregon	2–1	26–10	10–6
37	June 7	Fresno State	Coleman Field • Corvallis, Oregon	8–4	27–10	10–6

College World Series (0–2)

#	Date	Opponent	Site/stadium	Score	Overall record	MAC record
38	June 12	vs Duke	Omaha Municipal Stadium • Omaha, Nebraska	7–18	27–11	10–6
39	June 13	vs Texas	Omaha Municipal Stadium • Omaha, Nebraska	0–3	27–12	10–6

== Awards and honors ==
Bailey Brem

- All-Northern Division Team
- First Team All-Western Regional

Chuck Fisk

- All-Northern Division Team
- Second Team All-Western Regional

Pete Goodbred

- All-Northern Division Team

Dwane Helbig

- All-Northern Division Team
- First Team All-Western Regional

Danny Johnston

- All-Northern Division Team
