= Johnny Turco =

American athlete (1930–1960)

Profile
- Position: Halfback

Personal information
- Born: January 28, 1930; Walpole, Massachusetts, U.S.
- Died: March 24, 1960 (aged 27); Walpole, Massachusetts, U.S.
- Listed height: 5 ft 10 in (1.78 m)
- Listed weight: 170 lb (77 kg)

Career information
- College: Holy Cross (1949–1951)

Awards and highlights
- Second-team All-Eastern (1951)

Other information
- Baseball career
- Outfield
- Bats: Right Throws: Right

Teams
- Evansville Braves (1953–1954); Jacksonville Braves (1953–1954); Atlanta Crackers (1955)

Career highlights and awards
- College World Series champion (1952)

John Baptist Turco (January 28, 1930 – March 24, 1960) was an American athlete who played football and baseball at the College of the Holy Cross. He was a member of the Holy Cross Crusaders baseball team that won the 1952 College World Series.

== High School ==
Turco was a standout athlete at Walpole High School. The Boston Globe named him to their all-scholastic third team in football baseball his junior year and he was an honorable mention in baseball his sophomore and senior seasons.

== Football ==
On October 7, 1950, he scored five touchdowns in a 41–21 victory over Brown. His three receiving touchdowns against Brown was a school record until 1993. He ran for a then school-record 169 yards and scored four touchdowns in that year's Boston College–Holy Cross game. He was awarded the Captain Edward T. O'Melia Trophy as the contest's most outstanding player. He led the team in all-purpose yards (1305), kick return yards (329), punt return yards (174), and receptions (23) and set a school record for most touchdowns (17), receiving touchdowns (9), and points scored in a season (106). His 27.4 yards per kickoff return was the highest average in major college football that year.

In 1951, Turco again led the team in all-purpose yards (993) and 10 touchdowns. He and teammate Mel Massucco played for the North team in the 1951 North–South Shrine Game. Turco scored the North's only touchdown in a 35 to 7 loss. He finished his career with 15 receiving touchdowns and 29 touchdowns, both school records until they were broken by Gordie Lockbaum.

Turco was selected by the Philadelphia Eagles in the 22nd round of the 1952 NFL draft, but opted to pursue a career in baseball.

== Baseball ==
In 1952, Turco helped lead the Crusaders baseball team to its first College World Series championship. He led the team in batting average (.385), hits (37), runs (29), walks (23), and stolen bases (9) and was a named to the second 1952 College Baseball All-America Team. He finished his career at Holy Cross with a .373 batting average.

On August 30, 1952, Turco signed with the Milwaukee Braves. He split the 1953 and 1954 seasons with the Jacksonville Braves and Evansville Braves and played for the Atlanta Crackers in 1955. In 326 minor league games he batted .297 with 13 home runs and 126 RBI. An arm injury from his football days hindered his abilities as an outfielder.

== Later life ==
After his baseball career ended, Turco returned to Walpole, Massachusetts, where he worked in the insurance business. He died on March 24, 1960, from cancer. He was survived by his wife and son.
