= Duke Blue Devils baseball =

Collegiate baseball team representing Duke University

- 2027 Duke Blue Devils baseball team
- Founded: 1903 (123 years ago)
- University: Duke University
- Head coach: Corey Muscara (1st season)
- Conference: ACC
- Location: Durham, North Carolina
- Home stadium: Jack Coombs Field (capacity: 2,000)
- Nickname: Blue Devils
- Colors: Duke blue and white

College World Series appearances
- 1952, 1953, 1961

NCAA regional champions
- 2018, 2019, 2023, 2025

NCAA tournament appearances
- 1952, 1953, 1956, 1957, 1961, 2016, 2018, 2019, 2021, 2023, 2024, 2025

Conference tournament champions
- Southern Conference: 1951; Atlantic Coast Conference: 2021, 2024

Conference regular season champions
- SIAA: 1904; Southern Conference: 1929, 1937, 1938, 1939, 1951, 1952, 1953; Atlantic Coast Conference: 1956, 1957, 1961

The Duke Blue Devils baseball team is the varsity intercollegiate baseball program of Duke University, based in Durham, North Carolina, United States. The team has been a member of the Atlantic Coast Conference since the conference's founding in the 1954 season. The program's home venue is the Durham Bulls Athletic Park, which opened in 1995. As of the end of the 2019 season, the Blue Devils have appeared in three College World Series and 10 NCAA tournaments. They have won three ACC Championships. As of the start of the 2021 Major League Baseball season, 36 former Blue Devils players have played in Major League Baseball.

== History ==
The baseball program began varsity play in 1889. Led by Arthur Bradsher's 13–1 record they won the S.I.A.A. championship in 1904. The Trinity hurler struck out 169 batters during that championship season and walked only four batters the entire season.

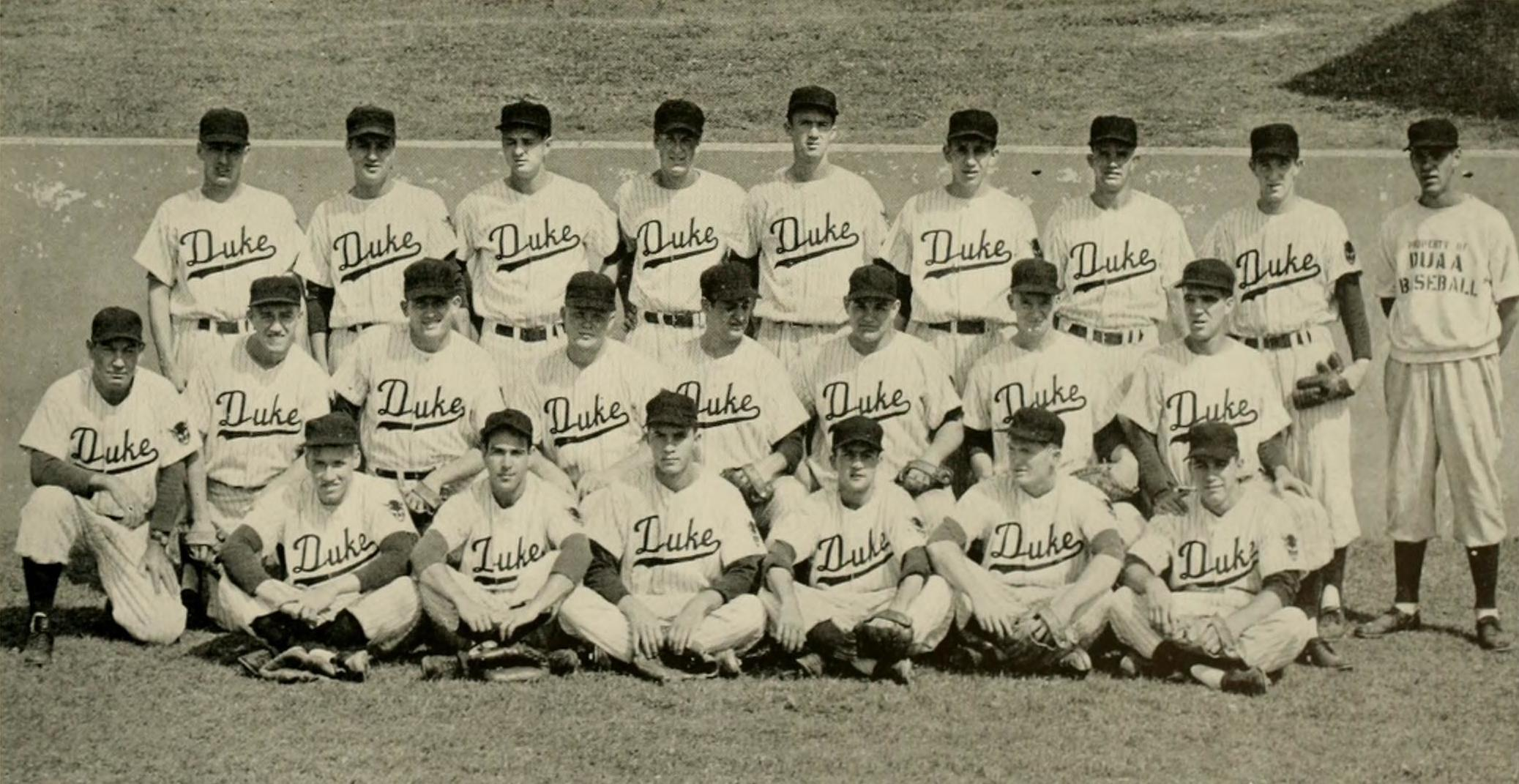
The Blue Devils baseball team in the 1955 edition of The Chanticleer

The vast majority of the program's successes came under head coaches Jack Coombs and Ace Parker from 1929–1966. Coombs led the Blue Devils to five Southern Conference championships and to a fifth-place finish in the 1952 College World Series. Taking over upon Coombs' retirement after the 1952 season, Parker led Duke to the 1953 and 1961 College World Series, one Southern Conference championship, and three Atlantic Coast Conference championships. In 2016, Duke earned their first bid to the NCAA tournament since their 1961 College World Series run, ending a 55-year drought. Head coach Chris Pollard continued this success, leading the Blue Devils to the NCAA Super Regionals in 2018 and 2019. In 2021, the Blue Devils defeated NC State at the 2021 ACC tournament, winning their first ever ACC Championship.

=== Steroid controversy ===
In 2005, the program was the target of a controversy involving the use of anabolic steroids. Five former players told the Duke Chronicle that head coach Bill Hillier had pressured players to use steroids, with two of those players admitting to having injected steroids in 2002. In an open letter published in the Chronicle, another former player, Evan Anderson, confirmed that Hillier had pressured players to use steroids. While Hillier denied the accusations, he was replaced as head coach after the 2005 season.

== Conference affiliations ==
- Southern Conference − 1929–1953
- Atlantic Coast Conference − 1954–present

== Head coaches ==
Year(s)	Coach	Seasons	W–L–T	Pct
1901	Mr. Schock	1	6–5	.545
1902–1907	Otis Stocksdale	6	76–37–4	.650
1908–1914	M.T. Adkins	7	104–67–4	.594
1915–1916	Claude West	2	14–26–3	.326
1917	Frank Manush	1	4–6–1	.364
1919	Lee Gooch	1	19–4–2	.760
1920	Chick Doak	1	10–9	.526
1921	Pat Egan	1	10–8–1	.526
1922	Herman G. Steiner	1	12–6	.667
1923–1924	Howard Jones	2	31–8	.795
1925	Bill Towe	1	9–9	.500
1926–1928	G.B. Whitted	3	28–29–1	.483
1929–1952	Jack Coombs	24	381–171–3	.686
1953–1966	Ace Parker	14	166–162–4	.500
1966–1967	James Bly	2	15–34	.306
1968–1970	Tom Butters	3	43–53–1	.443
1971–1977	Enos Slaughter	7	68–120	.362
1978–1984	Tom D'Armi	7	125–98–2	.556
1985–1987	Larry Smith	3	61–58–4	.496
1988–1999	Steve Traylor	12	356–286–1	.554
2000–2005	Bill Hillier	6	121–214	.361
2006–2012	Sean McNally	7	192–198–1	.492
2013–2025	Chris Pollard	13	420–295	.587
Totals			1,928–1,644–34	.539

== Year by year record ==
Season	Coach	Record		Notes
Season	Coach	Overall	Conference	Notes
1889	Unknown	0–0–1	—	
1890	Unknown	0–1	—	
1891	No Team			
1892	No Team			
1893	No Team			
1894	No Team			
1895	No Team			
1896	Unknown	7–1	—	
1897	Unknown	7–3	—	
1898	Unknown	4–4–1	—	
1899	Unknown	11–6	—	
1900	Unknown	8–4	—	
1901	Mr. Schock	6–5	—	
1902	Otis Stocksdale	12–8	—	
1903	Otis Stocksdale	9–5–1	—	
1904	Otis Stocksdale	14–3–2	—	SIAA champions
1905	Otis Stocksdale	14–6–1	—	
1906	Otis Stocksdale	8–7	—	
1907	Otis Stocksdale	19–8	—	
1908	M. T. Adkins	17–3–1	—	
1909	M. T. Adkins	18–7	—	
1910	M. T. Adkins	16–10–3	—	
1911	M. T. Adkins	16–9	—	
1912	M. T. Adkins	11–13	—	
1913	M. T. Adkins	15–13	—	
1914	M. T. Adkins	10–11	—	
1915	Claude West	8–9–1	—	
1916	Claude West	6–17–1	—	
1917	Frank Manush	4–6–1	—	
1918	No Team Due To World War I			
1919	Lee Gooch	19–4–2	—	
1920	Chick Doak	10–9	—	
1921	Pat Egan	10–8–1	—	
1922	Herman G. Steiner	12–6	—	
1923	Howard Jones	17–4	—	
1924	Howard Jones	14–4	—	
1925	Bill Towe	9–9	—	
1926	G.B. Whitted	7–12	—	
1927	G.B. Whitted	8–10	—	
1928	G.B. Whitted	13–7–1	—	
Southern Conference
1929	Jack Coombs	13–5	—	
1930	Jack Coombs	17–5	—	State Champions
1931	Jack Coombs	11–4	—	State Champions
1932	Jack Coombs	15–7	—	
1933	Jack Coombs	12–7	—	
1934	Jack Coombs	20–4	—	
1935	Jack Coombs	24–3	—	
1936	Jack Coombs	18–7	—	
1937	Jack Coombs	22–2	—	Southern Conference Champions, State Champions
1938	Jack Coombs	18–3	—	Southern Conference Champions, State Champions
1939	Jack Coombs	22–2	—	Southern Conference Champions, State Champions
1940	Jack Coombs	16–7	—	
1941	Jack Coombs	14–11	—	
1942	Jack Coombs	15–7	—	
1943	Jack Coombs	8–4	—	
1944	Jack Coombs	9–7	—	
1945	Jack Coombs	9–7	—	
1946	Jack Coombs	15–8	—	Big Four Champions
1947	Jack Coombs	18–10	13-6	Big Four Champions, State Champions
1948	Jack Coombs	15–12	—	
1949	Jack Coombs	12–17–1	9-13	
1950	Jack Coombs	11–18	—	
1951	Jack Coombs	17–8	—	Southern Conference Champions, Southern Conference Tournament champions, Co-Big Four Champions
1952	Jack Coombs	31–7	18-3	Southern Conference Champions, College World Series (5th place)
1953	Ace Parker	22–10	—	Southern Conference Champions, College World Series (5th place)
Atlantic Coast Conference
1954	Ace Parker	10–13	5–9	
1955	Ace Parker	10–11	6–6	
1956	Ace Parker	16–12–2	12–3–1	ACC Champions
1957	Ace Parker	19–8	10–4	ACC Champions
1958	Ace Parker	9–11	7–5	
1959	Ace Parker	9–16	5–10	
1960	Ace Parker	13–8–1	9–4–1	
1961	Ace Parker	16–11	11–3	ACC Champions, College World Series (5th place)
1962	Ace Parker	13–12–1	6–8	
1963	Ace Parker	15–10	8–6	
1964	Ace Parker	4–21	0–12	
1965	Ace Parker	8–17	5–9	
1966	Ace Parker/James Bly	13–12	9–9	
1967	James Bly	9–20	2–12	
1968	Tom Butters	12–19	7–13	
1969	Tom Butters	12–18–1	7–13	
1970	Tom Butters	17–16	10–11	
1971	Enos Slaughter	15–14	4–10	
1972	Enos Slaughter	12–16	3–7	
1973	Enos Slaughter	7–17	2–10	
1974	Enos Slaughter	9–16	3–8	
1975	Enos Slaughter	9–18	2–10	
1976	Enos Slaughter	7–23	1–11	
1977	Enos Slaughter	9–16	1–7	
1978	Tom D'Armi	12–21	1–10	
1979	Tom D'Armi	12–18	1–11	
1980	Tom D'Armi	17–11	2–9	
1981	Tom D'Armi	29–10	6–6	
1982	Tom D'Armi	16–13–1	3–7	
1983	Tom D'Armi	14–12–1	1–8–1	
1984	Tom D'Armi	25–13	3–8	
1985	Larry Smith	18–15–3	5–8–1	
1986	Larry Smith	25–17	2–12	
1987	Larry Smith	18–26–1	3–14	
1988	Steve Traylor	10–35	3–16	
1989	Steve Traylor	20–23	2–14	
1990	Steve Traylor	28–25	4–15	
1991	Steve Traylor	24–27	6–15	
1992	Steve Traylor	38–16	12–12	
1993	Steve Traylor	39–19–1	11–13	
1994	Steve Traylor	33–20	16–8	
1995	Steve Traylor	30–27	4–20	
1996	Steve Traylor	39–19	11–13	
1997	Steve Traylor	33–25	9–14	
1998	Steve Traylor	38–20	8–15	
1999	Steve Traylor	24–31	4–18	
2000	Bil Hillier	17–41	5–19	
2001	Bil Hillier	23–33	10–13	
2002	Bil Hillier	24–34	4–20	
2003	Bil Hillier	18–36	2–21	
2004	Bil Hillier	25–31	8–16	
2005	Bil Hillier	14–39	5–25	
2006	Sean McNally	15–40	6–24	
2007	Sean McNally	29–25	8–22	
2008	Sean McNally	37–18–1	10–18–1	
2009	Sean McNally	35–24	15–15	
2010	Sean McNally	29–27	8–22	
2011	Sean McNally	26–30	7–23	
2012	Sean McNally	21–34	9–21	
2013	Chris Pollard	26–29	9–21	
2014	Chris Pollard	33–25	16–14	
2015	Chris Pollard	31–22	10–19	
2016	Chris Pollard	33–24	14–15	NCAA Regional
2017	Chris Pollard	30–28	12–18	
2018	Chris Pollard	40–15	18–11	NCAA Super Regional
2019	Chris Pollard	35–27	15–15	NCAA Super Regional
2020	Chris Pollard	12-4	2-1	
2021	Chris Pollard	33-22	16-17	ACC Tournament champions, NCAA Regional
2022	Chris Pollard	22-32	10-20	
2023	Chris Pollard	39-24	16-13	NCAA Super Regional
2024	Chris Pollard	40-20	16-14	ACC Tournament champions, NCAA Regional
2025	Chris Pollard	41-21	17-13	Hosted NCAA Super Regional

== NCAA tournament record ==
Year	Record	Pct	Notes
1952	1–2	.333	College World Series (6th place)
1953	1–2	.333	College World Series (6th place)
1956	3–3	.500	District 3
1957	3–2	.600	District 3
1961	3–2	.600	College World Series (6th place)
2016	0–2	.000	Columbia Regional
2018	5–3	.625	Lubbock Super Regional
2019	4–2	.667	Nashville Super Regional
2021	1–2	.333	Knoxville Regional
2023	4–3	.571	Charlottesville Super Regional
2024	1–2	.333	Norman Regional
2025	4-2	.667	Hosted Durham Super Regional

== Individual awards ==
ACC Baseball Player of the Year

- Ryan Jackson (1994)

ACC Baseball Coach of the Year

- Tom D'Armi (1981)
- Steve Traylor (1992)

== Current and former major league players ==
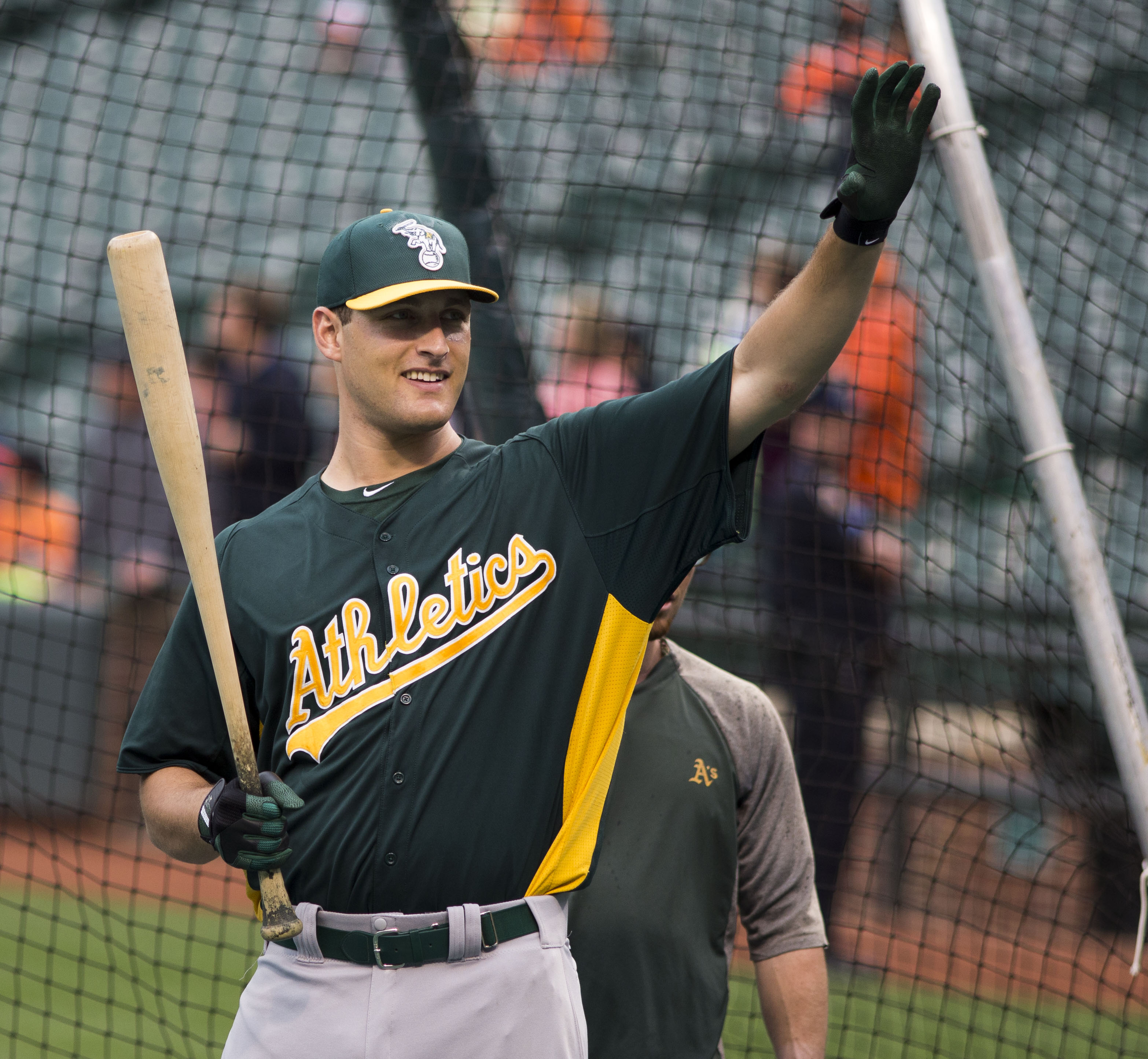
Nate Freiman

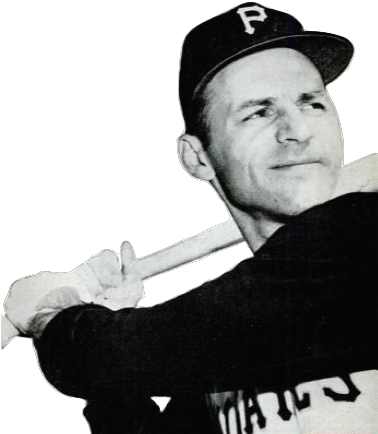
Dick Groat

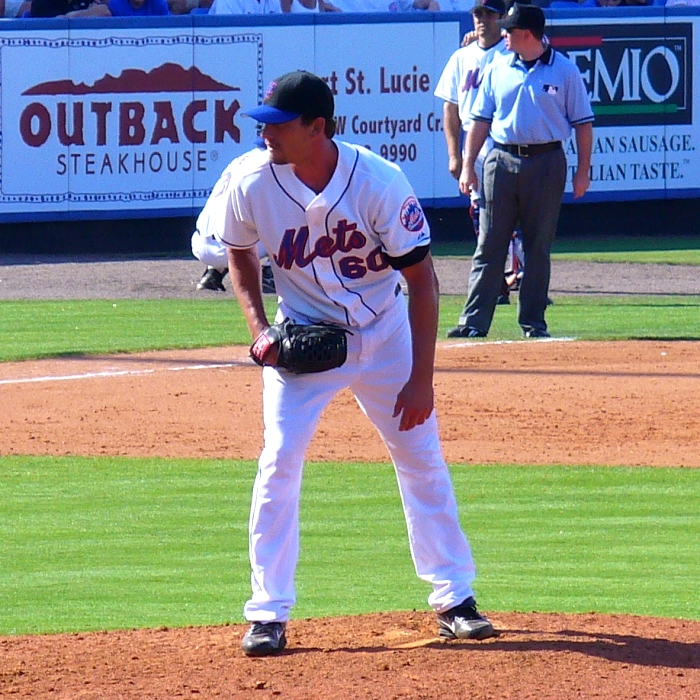
Scott Schoeneweis

- Wayne Ambler
- Bob Brower
- Greg Burke
- Chris Capuano
- Griffin Conine
- Bobby Coombs
- Claude Corbitt
- John Courtright
- Brandy Davis
- Crash Davis
- Ron Davis
- Mort Flohr
- Nate Freiman
- Lee Griffeth
- Dick Groat
- Alex Hassan
- Bryce Jarvis
- Ryan Jackson
- Footer Johnson
- Wade Lefler
- Joey Loperfido
- James Marvel
- Bill McCahan
- Quinton McCracken
- Tim McKeithan
- Matt Mervis
- Pete Naktenis
- Dan Otero
- Ace Parker
- Graham Pauley
- John Poff
- Graeme Stinson
- Scott Schoeneweis
- Frank Seward
- Eddie Shokes
- Dave Smith
- Al Spangler
- Marcus Stroman
- Eric Tipton
- Mike Trombley
- Hal Wagner
- Ken Weafer
- Billy Werber

=== Major league Baseball Draft ===
Player name	Year	Round	Overall	Team	Position	B/T	Signed
Jonathan Santucci	2024	2	46	New York Mets	LHP	L/L	Yes
Charlie Beilenson	2024	5	154	Seattle Mariners	RHP	R/R	Yes
Nick Conte	2024	8	227	Kansas City Royals	RHP	R/R	Yes
Fran Oschell	2024	12	352	Los Angeles Angels	RHP	R/R	Yes
Jimmy Romano	2024	16	479	Cincinnati Reds	RHP	R/R	Yes
Jay Beshears	2023	6	191	San Diego Padres	UT	R/R	Yes
Alex Mooney	2023	7	218	Cleveland Guardians	SS	R/R	Yes
Adam Boucher	2023	10	303	Tampa Bay Rays	RHP	R/R	Yes
Luke Fox	2023	17	520	Los Angeles Dodgers	LHP	L/L	Yes
Henry Williams	2022	3	91	San Diego Padres	RHP	R/R	Yes
Marcus Johnson	2022	4	112	Miami Marlins	RHP	R/R	Yes
Graham Pauley	2022	13	390	San Diego Padres	2B/3B	L/R	Yes
Billy Seidl	2022	15	461	Chicago White Sox	RHP	R/R	Yes
Jimmy Loper	2022	16	479	New York Mets	RHP	R/R	Yes
Ethan Murray	2021	5	147	Milwaukee Brewers	SS/2B	R/R	Yes
Joey Loperfido	2021	7	208	Houston Astros	UT	R/R	Yes
Peter Matt	2021	10	304	Chicago Cubs	LF/RF	R/R	Yes
Jack Carey	2021	11	313	Pittsburgh Pirates	RHP	R/R	Yes
Mike Rothenberg	2021	12	345	Detroit Tigers	C	S/R	Yes
Bryce Jarvis	2020	1	18	Arizona Diamondbacks	RHP	L/R	Yes
Matt Mervis	2020	--	UDFA	Chicago Cubs	1B	L/R	Yes
Graeme Stinson	2019	4	128	Tampa Bay Rays	LHP	L/L	Yes
Ben Gross	2019	10	299	Minnesota Twins	RHP	R/R	Yes
Kennie Taylor	2019	14	418	New York Mets	RF/LF	R/R	Yes
Adam Laskey	2019	19	582	Chicago Cubs	LHP	R/L	Yes
Bryce Jarvis	2019	37	1125	New York Yankees	RHP	L/R	No
Griffin Conine	2018	2	52	Toronto Blue Jays	RF/LF	L/R	Yes
Jimmy Herron	2018	3	98	Chicago Cubs	LF/CF	R/L	Yes
Christopher Proctor	2018	13	375	Detroit Tigers	C	L/R	Yes
Zack Kone	2018	13	384	Pittsburgh Pirates	3B/1B	R/R	Yes
Ethan DeCaster	2018	18	525	Detroit Tigers	RHP	L/L	Yes
Mitch Stallings	2018	30	892	Atlanta Braves	LHP	L/L	Yes
Justin Bellinger	2017	22	647	Cincinnati Reds	1B	L/L	Yes
James Ziemba	2017	22	655	Los Angeles Angels	LHP	R/L	Yes
Jimmy Herron	2017	31	932	New York Yankees	LF/CF	R/L	No
Bailey Clark	2016	5	164	Chicago Cubs	RHP	R/R	Yes
Mike Kaelin	2016	15	456	Los Angeles Angels	RHP	R/R	Yes
James Ziemba	2016	37	1097	Philadelphia Phillies	LHP	R/L	No
Brian Mcafee	2016	38	1140	Tampa Bay Rays	RHP	R/R	Yes
Michael Matuella	2015	3	78	Texas Rangers	RHP	R/R	Yes
Sarkis Ohanian	2015	9	265	Cincinnati Reds	RHP	R/R	Yes
Kenny Koplove	2015	17	504	Philadelphia Phillies	RHP	R/R	Yes
Andrew Istler	2015	23	702	Los Angeles Dodgers	RHP/OF	R/R	Yes
James Marvel	2015	36	1087	Pittsburgh Pirates	RHP	R/R	Yes
Andy Perez	2015	--	UDFA	Boston Red Sox	IF	R/R	Yes
Drew Van Orden	2014	5	154	Washington Nationals	RHP	R/R	Yes
Jordan Betts	2014	18	554	Boston Red Sox	IF	R/R	Yes
Rob Huber	2014	26	792	Oakland Athletics	RHP	R/R	Yes
Marcus Stroman	2012	1	22	Toronto Blue Jays	RHP	R/R	Yes
William Piwnica-Worms	2012	--	UDFA	Washington Nationals	OF	R/R	Yes
David Putman	2012	--	UDFA	Chicago White Sox	RHP	R/R	Yes
Eric Pfisterer	2012	--	UDFA	Atlanta Braves	LHP	L/L	Yes
Dennis O'Grady	2011	34	1043	San Diego Pades	RHP	R/R	Yes
Ben Grisz	2011	--	UDFA	Washington Nationals	RHP	R/R	Yes
Jake Lemmerman	2010	5	172	Los Angeles Dodgers	SS	R/R	Yes
Chris Manno	2010	26	776	Washington Nationals	LHP	L/L	Yes
Jeremy Gould	2010	28	842	New York Mets	LHP	R/L	Yes
Michael Ness	2010	33	993	Houston Astros	RHP	R/R	Yes
Ryan McCurdy	2010	--	UDFA	Houston Astros	C	R/R	Yes
Nate Freiman	2009	8	234	San Diego Padres	1B	R/R	Yes
Andrew Wolcott	2009	17	516	Arizona Diamondbacks	RHP	R/R	Yes
Matt Williams	2009	18	560	Chicago Cubs	C	R/R	Yes
Alex Hassan	2009	20	618	Boston Red Sox	OF	R/R	Yes
Chris Manno	2009	38	1132	Washington Nationals	LHP	L/L	No
Tim Sherlock	2009	40	1206	Arizona Diamondbacks	OF	L/L	Yes
Michael Ness	2009	47	1407	San Francisco Giants	RHP	R/R	No
Nate Freiman	2008	28	843	Texas Rangers	1B	R/R	No
Jimmy Gallagher	2007	7	239	Chicago White Sox	OF	L/L	Yes
Brett Bartles	2007	30	919	Cincinnati Reds	IF/OF	R/R	Yes
Tony Bajoczky	2007	34	1041	Boston Red Sox	RHP	R/R	Yes
Tim Layden	2004	6	186	Chicago Cubs	LHP	L/L	Yes
Zach Schreiber	2004	16	491	Atlanta Braves	RHP	R/R	Yes
Brian Patrick	2003	25	740	Toronto Blue Jays	2B	B/R	Yes
Larry Broadway	2002	3	77	Montreal Expos	IF	L/L	Yes
Kevin Kelly	2002	5	157	San Francisco Giants	SS	R/R	Yes
JD Alleva	2001	24	715	Kansas City Royals	C	L/R	Yes
Vaughn Schill	1999	4	125	Seattle Mariners	SS	R/R	Yes
Chris Capuano	1999	8	238	Arizona Diamondbacks	LHP	L/L	Yes
Stephen Cowie	1999	9	287	Cleveland Indians	RHP	R/R	Yes
Teddy Sullivan	1999	37	1127	Cleveland Indians	RHP	R/R	Yes
Jeff Becker	1999	46	1377	Cleveland Indians	IF	R/R	Yes
Jeff Becker	1998	20	596	Milwaukee Brewers	IF	R/R	No
Gregg Maluchnik	1998	20	611	Atlanta Braves	C	R/R	Yes
Richard Dishman	1997	23	712	Atlanta Braves	RHP	R/R	Yes
Scott Schoeneweis	1996	3	85	California Angels	LHP	L/L	Yes
Dave Darwin	1996	26	761	Detroit Tigers	LHP	L/L	Yes
Richard Dishman	1996	46	1346	San Francisco Giants	RHP	R/R	No
Mike King	1996	62	1614	Tampa Bay Rays	OF	R/R	Yes
Ray Farmer	1995	61	1534	Seattle Mariners	OF	R/R	No
Ryan Jackson	1994	7	180	Florida Marlins	1B/RF	L/L	Yes
Sean McNally	1994	16	443	Kansas City Royals	3B	R/R	Yes
Scott Pinoni	1994	20	555	Kansas City Royals	1B	R/R	Yes
Matt Harrell	1993	24	678	Montreal Expos	OF	R/R	Yes
Tony Runion	1993	58	1533	Cleveland Indians	RHP	R/R	Yes
Robert Baldwin	1993	79	1687	Chicago Cubs	OF	R/R	No
Mike Kotarski	1992	20	571	Colorado Rockies	LHP	L/L	Yes
Quinton McCraken	1992	25	711	Colorado Rockies	CF/LF	B/R	Yes
John Courtright	1991	8	223	Cincinnati Reds	LHP	L/L	Yes
Tim Rumer	1990	8	219	New York Yankees	LHP	L/L	Yes
Tim Roberts	1990	75	1464	Seattle Mariners	LHP	R/L	Yes
Mike Trombley	1989	14	373	Minnesota Twins	RHP	R/R	Yes
John Furch	1988	23	587	Chicago White Sox	1B	R/R	Yes
Ron Bianco	1984	14	366	Chicago White Sox	SS	B/R	No
Dave Amaro	1984	24	599	Chicago Cubs	1B	R/R	Yes
Tommy Decker	1984	41	812	Cleveland Indians	C	R/R	Yes
Todd Lamb	1983	10	256	Atlanta Braves	RHP	R/R	Yes
Tom Brassil	1982	6	135	SS	SS	R/R	Yes
Bob Brower	1982	--	UDFA	Texas Rangers	CF/LF	R/R	Yes
Tom Brassil	1981	15	380	Detroit Tigers	SS	R/R	No
Kevin Rigby	1980	14	341	Atlanta Braves	2B	L/R	Yes
Larry Doby	1979	34	811	Chicago White Sox	OF	B/R	Yes
Larry Doby	1978	17	434	Chicago White Sox	OF	B/R	No
Steve Kesses	1976	1	16	New York Mets	OF	R/R	Yes
John Poff	1974	--	UDFA	Philadelphia Phillies	OF/1B	L/L	Yes
Brian Bochow	1972	32	699	Pittsburgh Pirates	SS	R/R	No
Alan Schartz	1971	3	52	Cincinnati Reds	P	--	Yes
Ron Davis	1961	--	UDFA	Houston Colt 45s	OF	R/R	Yes
Al Spangler	1954	--	UDFA	Milwaukee Brewers	OF	L/L	Yes
Gary Coleman	1953	--	UDFA	Cleveland Baseball Team	1B	L/R	Yes

==== World Series Champions ====
- Dick Groat (1960, 1964 – Pittsburgh Pirates, St. Louis Cardinals)
- Scott Schoeneweis (2002 – Anaheim Angels)

== See also ==
- List of NCAA Division I baseball programs
- Duke Blue Devils
