= Joe Tanner (baseball) =

American baseball player, coach, and farm system instructor (1931–2020)

- Born: November 16, 1931; Newton, Mississippi, U.S.
- Died: April 1, 2020 (aged 88); Sarasota, Florida, U.S.
- Batted: Right Threw: Right

Minor League statistics
- Games: 790
- Batting Average: .256
- RBI: 302

Career highlights and awards
- First Team All Southwest Conference (1952); NBC World Series MVP (1968)

Joseph Henry Tanner (November 16, 1931 – April 1, 2020) was an American professional baseball player, coach, and farm system instructor spanning over 50 years.

He went to high school in Laurel, Mississippi. After a standout season hitting at Jones Junior College, Tanner played one year for the Texas Longhorns baseball team, making it to the 1952 College World Series. Tanner signed with the Boston Red Sox in 1953, playing just 25 games for the Red Sox Triple-A Louisville Colonels, before he spent the next two years in the US Army as an infantryman, returning to baseball for spring training in 1955. From 1955 to 1958, Tanner played for the Red Sox Double A and Triple-A affiliates. In 1959, Tanner signed with the Los Angeles Dodgers’ organization where he played his final three professional seasons at Triple-A before a back injury ended his professional career in 1961.

Tanner spent the next seven years playing semi-pro baseball, culminating in being named the National Baseball Congress World Series MVP in 1968, while playing for the semi-pro Jackson Braves.

In 1969, Tanner entered coaching, as a bunting and baserunning coach for the brand new Kansas City Royals Baseball Academy, which produced major leaguers Ron Washington, U L Washington, and Frank White. After four years at the Royals Academy, Tanner was the Chicago White Sox roving baserunning coach for two seasons. After the second season, Tanner took an 11-year break from professional baseball, utilizing his Business and Finance degree from the University of Texas at Austin to be a stockbroker in Texas.

In 1986, new Pittsburgh Pirates General Manager Syd Thrift, who had hired Tanner with the Royals in 1969, hired Tanner to be a Pirates roving instructor, focusing on bunting and baserunning. After two seasons with Pittsburgh, Tanner returned to the White Sox as a baserunning and bunting instructor, where he would invent a baseball practice tool that can now be found at every MLB Spring Training facility, the Tanner Tee, a metal batting tee with a soft rubber top. The Tanner Tee is not only used by every major league baseball team but many college and high school teams as well.

Tanner would spend much of the next two decades starting a business, Joe H. Tanner Baseball Products, LLC, in Sarasota, Florida, based around his innovative and increasingly popular tee. In 1993, Tanner was the Chicago Cubs roving infield and baserunning instructor. In 1994, Tanner got his first job on a coaching staff outside of the spring training facility, as the hitting coach of the Cubs’ Single-A Peoria Chiefs. Tanner moved to the Baltimore Orioles organization in 1996 and was an assistant coach for the Rookie League Gulf Coast Orioles from 1999 to 2003.

In 2012, Tanner sold the company to his grandsons but continued to make tees at his workbench. Joe Tanner died on April 1, 2020, in Sarasota, Florida.
