= 1952 Duke Blue Devils baseball team =

American college baseball season

1952 Duke Blue Devils baseball

Southern Conference champions District III champions

College World Series, T-5th
- Conference: Southern Conference
- Southern
- Record: 31–7 (10–2 SoCon)
- Head coach: Jack Coombs (24th season)
- Home stadium: Jack Coombs Field

1952 Southern Conference baseball standings
	Conf.				Overall
Team	W		L	PCT	W		L	PCT
Northern
Richmond ^{x}‍‍‍	6	–	2	.750	13	–	6	.684
George Washington ‍‍‍	7	–	3	.700		–		–
West Virginia ‍‍‍	7	–	3	.700		–		–
Washington and Lee ‍‍‍	6	–	5	.545		–		–
William & Mary ‍‍‍	5	–	6	.455		–		–
Maryland ‍‍‍	4	–	6	.400	11	–	9	.550
Virginia Tech ‍‍‍	3	–	6	.333	4	–	9	.308
VMI ‍‍‍	1	–	8	.111		–		–
Southern
Duke ^{x}‍‍‡‍	18	–	3	.857	31	–	7	.816
NC State ‍‍‍	10	–	5	.667		–		–
North Carolina ‍‍‍	10	–	7	.588	18	–	10	.643
South Carolina ‍‍‍	8	–	7	.533		–		–
Clemson ‍‍‍	10	–	10	.500	10	–	12	.455
Wake Forest ‍‍‍	7	–	11	.389	13	–	12	.520
Furman ‍‍‍	6	–	11	.353		–		–
Davidson ‍‍‍	3	–	9	.250		–		–
The Citadel ‍‍‍	3	–	12	.200		–		–
x – Division champion ‡ – Tournament champion As of June 30, 1952; Rankings from Collegiate Baseball

The 1952 Duke Blue Devils baseball team represented Duke University in the 1952 NCAA baseball season. The Blue Devils played their home games at Jack Coombs Field. The team was coached by Jack Coombs in his 24th year at Duke.

The Blue Devils won the District III playoff to advance to the College World Series, where they were defeated by the Western Michigan Broncos.

== Roster ==
1952 Duke Blue Devils baseball team
Players
Coaches

#	Pos.	Name	B/T	Height	Weight	Year	Home town
	OF	John Carroll	/	—	—	Sr	Malden, Massachusetts
	P	George Carver	/	—	—	Jr
	OF	Benny Cavaliere	/	—	—	Sr	Norristown, Pennsylvania
		Gordon Clapp	/	—	—	So
	P	Bob Davis	/	—	—	Sr
		Dick Denny	/	—	—	Sr
		Bill Donigan	/	—	—
		Johnny Gibbons	/	—	—	Jr
		Billy Goodman	/	—	—
	INF	Dick Groat	/	—	—	Sr
		Earle Hannel	/	—	—
	OF	Footer Johnson	/	—	—	Sr
		Bill Lea	/	—	—	Jr	Lynchburg, Virginia
	RHP	Joe Lewis	/R	—	—	So
		Jack McGuire	/	—	—	Sr
	OF	Red Smith	/	—	—	So
	C	John Tarr	/	—	—	So
		Bill Ward	/	—	—	Sr
	INF	Bill Werber	/	—	—	Jr

Head coach

Jack Coombs

Assistant coach(es)

Legend

- (C) Team captain
- (S) Suspended
- (I) Ineligible
- Injured
- Current redshirt

== Schedule ==
1952 Duke Blue Devils baseball game log
Regular season
March (4–1)

#	Date	Opponent	Site/stadium	Score	Overall record	SoCon record
1	March 25	at South Carolina	Unknown • Columbia, South Carolina	3–1	1–0	1–0
2	March 26	at Furman	Unknown • Greenville, South Carolina	6–1	2–0	2–0
3	March 27	at Furman	Unknown • Greenville, South Carolina	4–1	3–0	3–0
4	March 28	at Clemson	Riggs Field • Clemson, South Carolina	14–8	4–0	4–0
5	March 29	at Clemson	Riggs Field • Clemson, South Carolina	9–10	4–1	4–1

April (14–1)

#	Date	Opponent	Site/stadium	Score	Overall record	SoCon record
6	April 2	Yale	Jack Coombs Field • Durham, North Carolina	9–2	5–1	4–1
7	April 3	Yale	Jack Coombs Field • Durham, North Carolina	12–3	6–1	4–1
8	April 4	Michigan State	Jack Coombs Field • Durham, North Carolina	10–9	7–1	4–1
9	April 7	Penn	Jack Coombs Field • Durham, North Carolina	13–4	8–1	4–1
10	April 8	Penn	Jack Coombs Field • Durham, North Carolina	13–4	9–1	4–1
11	April 9	at North Carolina	Emerson Field • Chapel Hill, North Carolina	4–2	10–1	5–1
12	April 11	Ohio	Jack Coombs Field • Durham, North Carolina	1–4	10–2	5–1
13	April 12	at NC State	Riddick Stadium • Raleigh, North Carolina	13–2	11–2	6–1
14	April 14	Clemson	Jack Coombs Field • Durham, North Carolina	6–2	12–2	7–1
15	April 16	Davidson	Jack Coombs Field • Durham, North Carolina	16–1	13–2	8–1
16	April 17	at NC State	Riddick Stadium • Raleigh, North Carolina	18–9	14–2	9–1
17	April 18	Furman	Jack Coombs Field • Durham, North Carolina	20–5	15–2	10–1
18	April 19	North Carolina	Jack Coombs Field • Durham, North Carolina	13–5	16–2	11–1
19	April 22	at Wake Forest	Unknown • Winston-Salem, North Carolina	8–1	17–2	12–1
20	April 24	at Davidson	Unknown • Davidson, North Carolina	11–2	18–2	13–1

May (6–2)

#	Date	Opponent	Site/stadium	Score	Overall record	SoCon record
21	May 1	North Carolina	Jack Coombs Field • Durham, North Carolina	10–2	19–2	14–1
22	May 3	Wake Forest	Jack Coombs Field • Durham, North Carolina	6–4	20–2	15–1
23	May 6	NC State	Jack Coombs Field • Durham, North Carolina	2–13	20–3	15–2
24	May 7	at Wake Forest	Unknown • Winston-Salem, North Carolina	8–7	21–3	16–2
25	May 9	Wake Forest	Jack Coombs Field • Durham, North Carolina	14–11	22–3	17–2
26	May 10	at North Carolina	Emerson Field • Chapel Hill, North Carolina	9–13	22–4	17–3
27	May 12	NC State	Jack Coombs Field • Durham, North Carolina	6–0	23–4	18–3
28	May 15	NC State	Jack Coombs Field • Durham, North Carolina	6–0	23–4	18–3

Postseason
Southern Conference Tournament (4–1)

#	Date	Opponent	Site/stadium	Score	Overall record	SoCon record
29	May 15	vs George Washington	Devereaux Meadow • Raleigh, North Carolina	7–5	24–4	18–3
30	May 16	vs NC State	Devereaux Meadow • Raleigh, North Carolina	4–5	24–5	18–3
31	May 17	vs George Washington	Devereaux Meadow • Raleigh, North Carolina	8–4	25–5	18–3
32	May 18	vs NC State	Devereaux Meadow • Raleigh, North Carolina	6–0	26–5	18–3
33	May 18	vs NC State	Devereaux Meadow • Raleigh, North Carolina	8–3	27–5	18–3

District III Playoff (3–0)

#	Date	Opponent	Site/stadium	Score	Overall record	SoCon record
34	June 5	vs Tennessee	Unknown • Annapolis, Maryland	7–1	28–5	18–3
35	June 6	vs Rollins	Unknown • Annapolis, Maryland	5–4	29–5	18–3
36	June 7	vs Florida	Unknown • Annapolis, Maryland	4–3	30–5	18–3

College World Series (1–2)

#	Date	Opponent	Site/stadium	Score	Overall record	SoCon record
37	June 12	vs Oregon State	Omaha Municipal Stadium • Omaha, Nebraska	18–7	31–5	18–3
38	June 13	vs Penn State	Omaha Municipal Stadium • Omaha, Nebraska	7–12	31–6	18–3
39	June 14	vs Western Michigan	Omaha Municipal Stadium • Omaha, Nebraska	3–5	31–7	18–3

== Awards and honors ==
Dick Groat

- All-Southern Conference Team
- First Team All-American American Baseball Coaches Association

Footer Johnson

- All-Southern Conference Team

Joe Lewis

- All-Southern Conference Team
- First Team All-American Coaches

Red Smith

- All-Southern Conference Team

Billy Werber

- All-Southern Conference Team
- Second Team All-American Coaches
