= 1952 NCAA baseball season =

Baseball season

College World Series
- Champions: Holy Cross (1st title)
- Runners-up: Missouri (1st CWS Appearance)
- Winning coach: Jack Barry (1st title)
- MOP: James O'Neill (Holy Cross)

Seasons
- ← 1951 1953 →

The 1952 NCAA baseball season, play of college baseball in the United States organized by the National Collegiate Athletic Association (NCAA) began in the spring of 1952. The season progressed through the regular season and concluded with the 1952 College World Series. The College World Series, held for the sixth time in 1952, consisted of one team from each of eight geographical districts and was held in Omaha, Nebraska at Johnny Rosenblatt Stadium as a double-elimination tournament. Holy Cross claimed the championship.

== Conference winners ==
This is a partial list of conference champions from the 1952 season. Each of the eight geographical districts chose, by various methods, the team that would represent them in the NCAA Tournament. Conference champions had to be chosen, unless all conference champions declined the bid.

Conference	Regular season winner	Conference tournament	Tournament city	Tournament winner
Big Seven Conference	Missouri	No tournament		
CIBA	Southern California	No tournament		
EIBL	Brown; Cornell	No conference tournament		
Mid-American Conference	Western Michigan	No tournament		
Missouri Valley Conference	Houston	1952 Missouri Valley Conference baseball tournament	Stillwater, OK	Saint Louis
Pacific Coast Conference	Oregon State	No tournament		
Rocky Mountain Conference	Colorado State	No tournament		
Southeastern Conference	Florida	No tournament		
Southern Conference	North - Richmond; South - Duke	1952 Southern Conference baseball tournament	Greensboro, NC	Duke
Southwest Conference	Texas	No tournament		
Yankee Conference	Connecticut; UMass	No conference tournament		

== Conference standings ==
The following is an incomplete list of conference standings:

1952 Big Seven Conference baseball standings
	Conf.				Overall
Team	W		L	PCT	W		L	PCT
Missouri ‍†‍‍^{y}	13	–	1	.929	20	–	7	.741
Nebraska ‍‍‍	8	–	5	.615	13	–	7	.650
Kansas ‍‍‍	8	–	6	.571	11	–	6	.647
Iowa State ‍‍‍	6	–	6	.500		–		–
Colorado ‍‍‍	5	–	6	.455		–		–
Oklahoma ‍‍‍	10	–	1	.909	19	–	9	.679
Kansas State ‍‍‍	2	–	15	.118	4	–	16	.200
† – Conference champion y – Invited to the College World Series; As of June 30, 1952; Rankings from Collegiate Baseball

1952 Eastern Intercollegiate Baseball League baseball standings
	Conf.						Overall
Team	W		L		T	PCT	W		L		T	PCT
Northern Division
Brown ^{x}‍‍‍	6	–	2	–	0	.750	10	–	6	–	0	.625
Army ‍‍‍	5	–	3	–	0	.625	10	–	10	–	2	.500
Dartmouth ‍‍‍	4	–	4	–	0	.500	11	–	11	–	0	.500
Yale ‍‍‍	3	–	5	–	0	.375	10	–	22	–	0	.313
Harvard ‍‍‍	2	–	6	–	0	.250	6	–	11	–	1	.361
Southern Division
Cornell ^{x}‍‍‍	6	–	2	–	0	.750	11	–	6	–	0	.647
Columbia ‍‍‍	5	–	2	–	0	.714	9	–	7	–	2	.556
Princeton ‍‍‍	4	–	4	–	0	.500	11	–	11	–	1	.500
Navy ‍‍‍	3	–	4	–	0	.429	11	–	6	–	2	.632
Penn ‍‍‍	1	–	7	–	0	.125	6	–	19	–	1	.250
x – Division champion

1952 Mid-American Conference baseball standings
	Conf.				Overall
Team	W		L	PCT	W		L	PCT
Western Michigan ‍†‍‍^{y}	8	–	0	1.000	18	–	7	.720
Ohio ‍‍‍	7	–	2	.778	18	–	6	.750
Miami (OH) ‍‍‍	6	–	4	.600	13	–	10	.565
Kent State ‍‍‍	5	–	4	.556	9	–	5	.643
Cincinnati ‍‍‍	3	–	5	.375	5	–	11	.313
Toledo ‍‍‍	1	–	8	.111	2	–	10	.167
Western Reserve ‍‍‍	1	–	9	.100	8	–	5	.615
† – Conference champion y – Invited to the NCAA tournament As of June 30, 1952

1952 Missouri Valley Conference baseball standings
	Conf.				Overall
Team	W		L	PCT	W		L	PCT
Northern
Saint Louis ^{x}‍‍‡‍	4	–	1	.800	10	–	8	.556
Tulsa ‍‍‍	2	–	4	.333	9	–	8	.529
Detroit ‍‍‍	1	–	2	.333	8	–	9	.471
Southern
Houston ^{x}‍‍‍	6	–	2	.750	11	–	6	.647
Oklahoma A&M ‍‍‍	5	–	2	.714	15	–	5	.750
Wichita State ‍‍‍	0	–	6	.000	3	–	10	.231
x – Division champion ‡ – Tournament champion As of June 30, 1952

1952 Pacific Coast Conference baseball standings
	Conf.						Overall
Team	W		L		T	PCT	W		L		T	PCT
North Division
Oregon State ‍†‍‍^{y}	10	–	6	–	0	.625	27	–	12	–	0	.692
Washington ‍‍‍	10	–	6	–	0	.625	14	–	9	–	0	.609
Oregon ‍‍‍	9	–	6	–	0	.600	19	–	12	–	0	.613
Washington State ‍‍‍	6	–	10	–	0	.375	19	–	15	–	0	.559
Idaho ‍‍‍	4	–	11	–	0	.267	0	–	0	–	0	–
California Intercollegiate Baseball Association
USC ‍†‍‍	11	–	5	–	0	.688	18	–	9	–	0	.667
Stanford ‍‍‍	9	–	7	–	0	.563	19	–	13	–	1	.591
UCLA ‍‍‍	8	–	8	–	0	.500	21	–	15	–	0	.583
Santa Clara ‍‍‍	7	–	9	–	0	.438	18	–	12	–	0	.600
California ‍‍‍	5	–	11	–	0	.313	21	–	16	–	0	.568
† – Conference champion y – Invited to the NCAA tournament

1952 Rocky Mountain Conference baseball standings
	Conf.				Overall
Team	W		L	PCT	W		L	PCT
Colorado State ‍†‍‍^{y}	9	–	1	.900	15	–	9	.625
Colorado College ‍‍‍	2	–	4	.333		–		–
Colorado Mines ‍‍‍	1	–	5	.167		–		–
Western State ‍‍‍	0	–	2	.000		–		–
† – Conference champion y – Invited to the College World Series; As of June 30, 1952; Rankings from Collegiate Baseball

1952 Southern Conference baseball standings
	Conf.				Overall
Team	W		L	PCT	W		L	PCT
Northern
Richmond ^{x}‍‍‍	6	–	2	.750	13	–	6	.684
George Washington ‍‍‍	7	–	3	.700		–		–
West Virginia ‍‍‍	7	–	3	.700		–		–
Washington and Lee ‍‍‍	6	–	5	.545		–		–
William & Mary ‍‍‍	5	–	6	.455		–		–
Maryland ‍‍‍	4	–	6	.400	11	–	9	.550
Virginia Tech ‍‍‍	3	–	6	.333	4	–	9	.308
VMI ‍‍‍	1	–	8	.111		–		–
Southern
Duke ^{x}‍‍‡‍	18	–	3	.857	31	–	7	.816
NC State ‍‍‍	10	–	5	.667		–		–
North Carolina ‍‍‍	10	–	7	.588	18	–	10	.643
South Carolina ‍‍‍	8	–	7	.533		–		–
Clemson ‍‍‍	10	–	10	.500	10	–	12	.455
Wake Forest ‍‍‍	7	–	11	.389	13	–	12	.520
Furman ‍‍‍	6	–	11	.353		–		–
Davidson ‍‍‍	3	–	9	.250		–		–
The Citadel ‍‍‍	3	–	12	.200		–		–
x – Division champion ‡ – Tournament champion As of June 30, 1952; Rankings from Collegiate Baseball

1952 Southwest Conference baseball standings
	Conf.				Overall
Team	W		L	PCT	W		L	PCT
Texas ‍†‍‍^{y}	11	–	4	.733	19	–	9	.679
Baylor ‍‍‍	9	–	6	.600	9	–	6	.600
TCU ‍‍‍	8	–	7	.533	13	–	12	.520
SMU ‍‍‍	6	–	9	.400	13	–	11	.542
Texas A&M ‍‍‍	6	–	9	.400	10	–	19	.345
Rice ‍‍‍	5	–	10	.333	12	–	13	.480
† – Conference champion y – Invited to the College World Series; As of June 30, 1952; Rankings from Collegiate Baseball

== College World Series ==
The 1952 season marked the sixth NCAA Baseball Tournament, which consisted of the eight team College World Series. The College World Series was held in Omaha, Nebraska. Districts used a variety of selection methods to the event, from playoffs to a selection committee. District playoffs were not considered part of the NCAA Tournament, and the expansion to eight teams resulted in the end of regionals as they existed from 1947 through 1949. The eight teams played a double-elimination format, with Holy Cross claiming their first championship with an 8–4 win over Missouri in the final.

Upper round 1
Penn State	5
Texas	3
Duke	18
Oregon State	7
Holy Cross	5
Western Michigan	1
Missouri	15
Colorado State College	1

Upper round 2
Penn State	12
Duke	7
Holy Cross	0
Missouri	1
Lower round 1
Texas	10
Oregon State	1
Western Michigan	8
Colorado State College	6

Upper final
Penn State	2
Missouri	3
Lower round 2
Holy Cross	2
Texas	1
Duke	1
Western Michigan	5

Semifinals
Holy Cross	15
Penn State	4
Holy Cross	15
Western Michigan	3

Final
Missouri	3	4
Holy Cross	7	8
