= Pete Naton =

American baseball player (1931–2013)

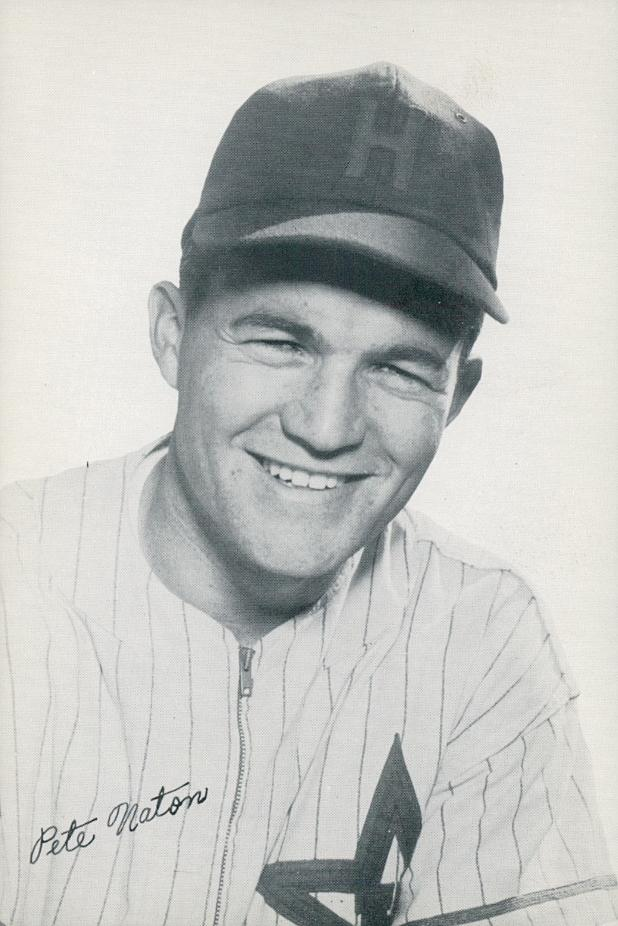
- Naton with the Hollywood Stars c. 1957
- Catcher
- Born: September 9, 1931; Flushing, New York, U.S.
- Died: December 10, 2013 (aged 82); Springfield, Massachusetts, U.S.
- Batted: Right Threw: Right

MLB debut
- June 16, 1953, for the Pittsburgh Pirates

Last MLB appearance
- September 19, 1953, for the Pittsburgh Pirates

MLB statistics
- Batting average: .167
- Home runs: 0
- Runs batted in: 1
- Stats at Baseball Reference

Teams
- Pittsburgh Pirates (1953)

Peter Alphonsus Naton (September 9, 1931 – December 10, 2013) was an American professional baseball catcher who appeared in six Major League games for the Pittsburgh Pirates in 1953. He threw and batted right-handed, stood 6 feet 1 inch (1.85 m) tall and weighed 200 pounds (91 kg).

Naton played in the third annual Hearst Sandlot Classic in 1949 and in the 1952 College World Series for the victorious Holy Cross Crusaders. On June 12, 1953, shortly after graduating from Holy Cross, Naton signed with the Pirates. Four days later, he made his MLB debut as the starting catcher in the second game of a doubleheader against the Chicago Cubs at Wrigley Field. Naton was hitless in three at bats against Chicago left-hander Howie Pollet. Naton appeared as a pinch hitter three days later, going hitless, and then spent the middle of the season in the minor leagues before his recall to Pittsburgh in September. On September 13, Naton collected his first Major League hit, a single off Ken Raffensberger of the Cincinnati Redlegs. He also drew two bases on balls and recorded his only MLB run batted in. All told, he came to bat 12 times for the Pirates, with two hits — both singles.

After spending 1954 with the Class B Burlington-Graham Pirates, Naton was again added to Pittsburgh's 40-man roster in September. This time, however, he saw no action, and on Friday, November 19, was optioned to Hollywood to make room for Roberto Clemente, Pittsburgh's selection in that year's Major League Draft. Naton spent the remainder of his career in the minors, almost exclusively in the Pittsburgh farm system; his lone break from the Pirates was a 10-game stint with the Dallas Eagles, an affiliate of the New York Giants. He retired after the 1958 campaign.

He was inducted into the Holy Cross Athletics Hall of Fame in 1993.
