= 1952 Holy Cross Crusaders baseball team =

American college baseball season

1952 Holy Cross Crusaders baseball

National champions

College World Series vs Missouri
- Conference: Independent
- Record: 21–3
- Head coach: Jack Barry (32nd year)
- Home stadium: Fitton Field

The 1952 Holy Cross Crusaders baseball team represented the College of the Holy Cross in the 1952 NCAA baseball season. The Crusaders played their home games at Fitton Field. The team was coached by Jack Barry in his 32nd season at Holy Cross.

The Crusaders won the College World Series, defeating the Missouri Tigers in the championship game.

== Roster ==
1952 Holy Cross Crusaders roster
Pitchers: Dick Bogdan; Leo Cadrin; Mike Cariglia; Dick Gormley; Jim Kelly; Jack Lonergan; James O'Neill; Ronnie Perry; Don Slattery; Bill Rochford	Infielders: Paul Brisette; Jack Concannon; Fran Dyson; Hugh French; Bob Johnson; Jack Keenan; Bob Manning; Frank Matrango	Outfielders: Jack Hetherton; Dick Hogan; Art Moossmann; John Summa; Johnny Turco; Catchers: John Carroll; Pete Naton; Tony Parisi

== Schedule ==
Legend
Holy Cross win
Holy Cross loss

1952 Holy Cross Crusaders baseball game log
Regular season

April
Date	Opponent	Site/stadium	Score	Overall record
April 19	Dartmouth	Fitton Field • Worcester, MA	W 4–2	1–0
April 22	Brown	Fitton Field • Worcester, MA	W 8–6	2–0
April 26	Colgate	Fitton Field • Worcester, MA	W 7–3	3–0

May
Date	Opponent	Site/stadium	Score	Overall record
May 1	at Springfield	Springfield, MA	W 9–8	4–0
May 3	Seton Hall	Fitton Field • Worcester, MA	W 9–2	5–0
May 8	at Brown	Providence, RI	W 9–0	6–0
May 10	at Harvard	Soldier's Field • Cambridge, MA	W 3–1	7–0
May 17	Providence	Fitton Field • Worcester, MA	W 5–4	8–0
May 22	at Dartmouth	Hanover, NH	L 1–2	8–1
May 24	Harvard	Fitton Field • Worcester, MA	W 13–3	9–1
May 27	Trinity	Fitton Field • Worcester, MA	W 12–7	10–1
May 30	Boston College	Fitton Field • Worcester, MA	W 5–4	11–1
May 31	at Providence	Providence, RI	W 16–14	12–1

June
Date	Opponent	Site/stadium	Score	Overall record
June 4	Yale	Fitton Field • Worcester, MA	W 8–4	13–1
June 7	at Amherst	Amherst, MA	L 7–10	13–2
June 9	at Boston College	Chestnut Hill, MA	W 6–4	14–2
June 10	Boston College	Fitton Field • Worcester, MA	W 13–3	15–2

Postseason

1952 College World Series
Date	Opponent	Site/stadium	Score	Overall record	CWS record
June 12	vs. Western Michigan	Johnny Rosenblatt Stadium • Omaha, NE	W 5–1	16–2	1–0
June 13	vs. Missouri	Johnny Rosenblatt Stadium • Omaha, NE	L 0–1	16–3	1–1
June 14	vs. Texas	Johnny Rosenblatt Stadium • Omaha, NE	W 2–1	17–3	2–1
June 15	vs. Western Michigan	Johnny Rosenblatt Stadium • Omaha, NE	W 15–3	18–3	3–1
June 15	vs. Penn State	Johnny Rosenblatt Stadium • Omaha, NE	W 15–4	19–3	4–1
June 16	vs. Missouri	Johnny Rosenblatt Stadium • Omaha, NE	W 7–3	20–3	5–1
June 17	vs. Missouri	Johnny Rosenblatt Stadium • Omaha, NE	W 8–4	21–3	6–1

== Awards and honors ==
James O'Neill

- All-America First Team
- College World Series Most Outstanding Player
