= 1952 Colorado State Bears baseball team =

American college baseball season

1952 Colorado State College Bears baseball

Rocky Mountain Conference champions District VII playoff champions

College World Series, T-7th
- Conference: Rocky Mountain Conference
- Record: 15–9 (9–1 RMC)
- Head coach: Pete Butler (10th season)
- Home stadium: Jackson Field

1952 Rocky Mountain Conference baseball standings
	Conf.				Overall
Team	W		L	PCT	W		L	PCT
Colorado State ‍†‍‍^{y}	9	–	1	.900	15	–	9	.625
Colorado College ‍‍‍	2	–	4	.333		–		–
Colorado Mines ‍‍‍	1	–	5	.167		–		–
Western State ‍‍‍	0	–	2	.000		–		–
† – Conference champion y – Invited to the College World Series; As of June 30, 1952; Rankings from Collegiate Baseball

The 1952 Colorado State College Bears baseball team represented Colorado State College of Education in the 1952 NCAA baseball season. The Bears played their home games at Jackson Field. The team was coached by Pete Butler in his 10th year at Colorado State.

The Bears won the District VII playoff to advance to the College World Series, where they were defeated by the Western Michigan Broncos.

== Roster ==
1952 Colorado State College Bears baseball team
Players
Coaches

#	Pos.	Name	B/T	Height	Weight	Year	Home town
		Milton Audrey	/	—	—
		Bob Beigel	/	—	—
		Ronnie Capra	/	—	—	So
		Constable	/	—	—
		Delbert Davies	/	—	—
	INF	Bob Distifano	/	—	—
	INF	Jim Ditolla	/	—	—
		Durkin	/	—	—
		Richard Howerton	/	—	—	Jr
		Jerry McMillen	/	—	—
		Menardi	/	—	—
		Al Minaya	/	—	—	Jr
		Dick Porter	/	—	—	So
		George Sage	/	—	—	So
	RHP	Bob Stewart	/R	—	—	Jr
	OF	Cyril Trofholz	/	—	—	Sr
		Don Williams	/	—	—	Sr

Head coach

Pete Butler

Assistant coach(es)

Art Wollenweber

Legend

- (C) Team captain
- (S) Suspended
- (I) Ineligible
- Injured
- Current redshirt

== Schedule ==
1952 Colorado State Bears baseball game log
Regular season
Regular Season (13–7)

#	Date	Opponent	Site/stadium	Score	Overall record	RMC record
1		Colorado Mines	Jackson Field • Greeley, Colorado	17–6	1–0	1–0
2		Colorado Mines	Jackson Field • Greeley, Colorado	12–6	2–0	2–0
3		vs Lowry Air Force Base	Unknown • Unknown, Colorado	4–7	2–1	2–0
4		vs Lowry Air Force Base	Unknown • Unknown, Colorado	25–7	3–1	2–0
5		vs Wyoming	Unknown • Unknown	4–6	3–2	2–0
6		vs Wyoming	Unknown • Unknown	4–9	3–3	2–0
7		vs Denver	Unknown • Unknown	8–7	4–3	2–0
8		vs Colorado College	Unknown • Unknown	2–6	4–4	2–1
9		vs Colorado College	Unknown • Unknown	13–11	5–4	3–1
10		vs Colorado A&M	Unknown • Unknown	6–5	6–4	3–1
11		vs Colorado Mines	Unknown • Unknown	23–2	7–4	4–1
12		vs Colorado Mines	Unknown • Unknown	10–2	8–4	5–1
13		vs Colorado A&M	Unknown • Unknown	5–15	8–5	5–1
14		Western State	Jackson Field • Greeley, Colorado	10–3	9–5	6–1
15		Western State	Jackson Field • Greeley, Colorado	14–5	10–5	7–1
16		vs Denver	Unknown • Unknown	3–4	10–6	7–1
17		vs Colorado College	Unknown • Unknown	6–0	11–6	8–1
18		vs Colorado College	Unknown • Unknown	1–0	12–6	9–1
19		vs Lowry Air Force Base	Unknown • Unknown	8–10	12–7	9–1
20		vs Lowry Air Force Base	Unknown • Unknown	7–6	13–7	9–1

Postseason
District VII Playoff (2–0)

#	Date	Opponent	Site/stadium	Score	Overall record	RMC record
21	May 30	BYU	Jackson Field • Greeley, Colorado	7–6	14–7	9–1
22	May 31	BYU	Jackson Field • Greeley, Colorado	11–6	15–7	9–1

College World Series (0–2)

#	Date	Opponent	Site/stadium	Score	Overall record	RMC record
23	June 12	vs Missouri	Omaha Municipal Stadium • Omaha, Nebraska	1–15	15–8	9–1
24	June 13	vs Western Michigan	Omaha Municipal Stadium • Omaha, Nebraska	6–8	15–9	9–1

== Awards and honors ==
Bob Distifano

- All-Rocky Mountain Conference Team

Jim DiTollo

- All-Rocky Mountain Conference Team

Bob Stewart

- All-Rocky Mountain Conference Team

Cyril Trofholz

- All-Rocky Mountain Conference Team
