= 1952 Missouri Tigers baseball team =

Collegiate baseball team

1952 Missouri Tigers baseball

College World Series Runner-up Big Seven Conference champions
- Conference: Big Eight Conference
- Record: 20–7 (13–1 Big Seven)
- Head coach: Hi Simmons (14th year)

1952 Big Seven Conference baseball standings
	Conf.				Overall
Team	W		L	PCT	W		L	PCT
Missouri ‍†‍‍^{y}	13	–	1	.929	20	–	7	.741
Nebraska ‍‍‍	8	–	5	.615	13	–	7	.650
Kansas ‍‍‍	8	–	6	.571	11	–	6	.647
Iowa State ‍‍‍	6	–	6	.500		–		–
Colorado ‍‍‍	5	–	6	.455		–		–
Oklahoma ‍‍‍	10	–	1	.909	19	–	9	.679
Kansas State ‍‍‍	2	–	15	.118	4	–	16	.200
† – Conference champion y – Invited to the College World Series; As of June 30, 1952; Rankings from Collegiate Baseball

The 1952 Missouri Tigers baseball team represented the University of Missouri in the 1952 NCAA baseball season. The Tigers played their home games at Rollins Field. The team was coached by Hi Simmons in his 14th season at Missouri.

Led by All-Americans Don Boenker and Junior Wren, the Tigers advanced to the 1952 College World Series, losing to Holy Cross in the championship.

== Roster ==
1952 Missouri Tigers
Roster
Dick Atkinson; Bill Barbour; Bert Beckmann; Ross Boeger; Don Boenker; Dick Dickinson; Herb Gellman; John Jenkins; Kent Kurtz; Gil Lauer; Ralph Monroe; John Patchett; Junior Wren

== Schedule ==
1952 Missouri Tigers baseball game log

Regular season
Opponent	Score	Overall record	Big Seven Record
Fort Leonard Wood	3–1	1–0	–
TCU	0–5	1–1	–
TCU	7–6	2–1	–
Oklahoma State	0–3	2–2	–
Oklahoma State	5–6	2–3	–
Kansas State	20–0	3–3	1-0
Kansas State	12–4	4–3	2-0
Iowa State	7–0	5–3	3-0
Iowa State	6–2	6–3	4-0
Fort Leonard Wood	2–6	6–4	–
Kansas State	9–6	7–4	5-0
Kansas State	4–5	7–5	5-1
Colorado	18–4	8–5	6-1
Colorado	19–4	9–5	7-1
Oklahoma	7–4	10–5	8-1
Oklahoma	5–4	11–5	9-1
Nebraska	6–5	12–5	10-1
Nebraska	8–5	13–5	11-1
Kansas	2–0	14–5	12-1
Kansas	5–2	15–5	13-1
Saint Louis	7–1	16–5	–
Saint Louis	8–1	17–5	–

Postseason

NCAA tournament: College World Series
Date	Opponent	Site/stadium	Score	Overall record
June 12	vs. Colorado State	Omaha Municipal Stadium • Omaha, Nebraska	15–1	18–5
June 13	vs. Holy Cross	Omaha Municipal Stadium • Omaha, Nebraska	1–0	19–5
June 14	vs. Penn State	Omaha Municipal Stadium • Omaha, Nebraska	3–2	20–5
June 16	vs. Holy Cross	Omaha Municipal Stadium • Omaha, Nebraska	3–7	20–6
June 17	vs. Holy Cross	Omaha Municipal Stadium • Omaha, Nebraska	4–8	20–7

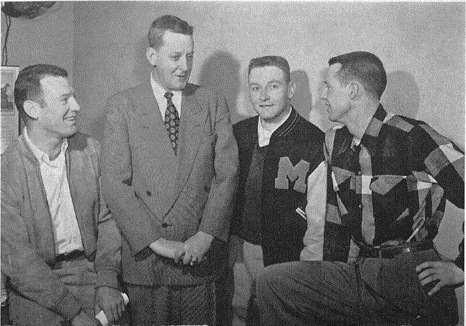
Coach Simmons (in suit) with All-American Wren, Boenker, and Kurtz

== Awards and honors ==
Don Boenker

- First Team All-American

Junior Wren

- First Team All-American

Kent Kurtz

- Third Team All-American
