= 1952 Western Michigan Broncos baseball team =

American college baseball season

1952 Western Michigan Broncos baseball

Mid-American Conference champions District IV champions

College World Series, T-3rd
- Conference: Mid-American Conference
- Record: 18–7 (8–0 MAC)
- Head coach: Charlie Maher (14th season)
- Assistant coach: Matt Patanelli
- Home stadium: Hyames Field

1952 Mid-American Conference baseball standings
	Conf.				Overall
Team	W		L	PCT	W		L	PCT
Western Michigan ‍†‍‍^{y}	8	–	0	1.000	18	–	7	.720
Ohio ‍‍‍	7	–	2	.778	18	–	6	.750
Miami (OH) ‍‍‍	6	–	4	.600	13	–	10	.565
Kent State ‍‍‍	5	–	4	.556	9	–	5	.643
Cincinnati ‍‍‍	3	–	5	.375	5	–	11	.313
Toledo ‍‍‍	1	–	8	.111	2	–	10	.167
Western Reserve ‍‍‍	1	–	9	.100	8	–	5	.615
† – Conference champion y – Invited to the NCAA tournament As of June 30, 1952

The 1952 Western Michigan Broncos baseball team represented Michigan College of Education (now known Western Michigan University) in the 1952 NCAA baseball season. The Broncos played their home games at Hyames Field. The team was coached by Charlie Maher in his 14th year at Western Michigan.

The Broncos won the District IV playoff to advanced to the College World Series, where they were defeated by the Holy Cross Crusaders.

== Roster ==
1952 Western Michigan Broncos baseball team
Players
Coaches

#	Pos.	Name	B/T	Height	Weight	Year	Home town
	INF	Bud Brotebeck	/	—	—		Flint, Michigan
	RHP	Tom Cole	/R	—	—		Flint, Michigan
		Jack Dobbs	/	—	—		Flint, Michigan
		Jack Dobbs	/	—	—		Plymouth, Michigan
		Juane Emarr	/	—	—		Kalamazoo, Michigan
	INF	Dave Gottschalk	/	—	—		Detroit, Michigan
17	LHP	Gary Graham	/L	—	—		Flint, Michigan
	INF	Bill Hayes	/	—	—		Janesville, Wisconsin
		Ron Heaviland	/	—	—		Detroit, Michigan
		Ken Hency	/	—	—		Detroit, Michigan
	C	Al Horn	/	—	—		Paw Paw, Michigan
	INF	Ron Jackson	/	—	—		Kalamazoo, Michigan
	OF	Len Johnston	/	—	—		Saginaw, Michigan
		Stan Malek	/	—	—		Hamtramck, Michigan
		Charlie Mikulas	/	—	—		Detroit, Michigan
	OF	Al Nagel	/	—	—		Marshall, Michigan
	RHP	Bob Urda	/R	—	—		Cleveland, Ohio

Head coach

Charlie Maher

Assistant coach(es)

Matt Patanelli

Legend

- (C) Team captain
- (S) Suspended
- (I) Ineligible
- Injured
- Current redshirt

Roster
Last update: November 21, 2020

== Schedule ==
1952 Western Michigan Broncos baseball game log
Regular season
April (7–2)

#	Date	Opponent	Site/stadium	Score	Overall record	MAC record
1	April 11	at Ohio State	Varsity Diamond • Columbus, Ohio	2–4	0–1	–
2	April	vs Marshall	Unknown • Unknown	8–2	1–1	–
3	April	vs Marshall	Unknown • Unknown	6–8	1–2	–
4	April	vs Ohio	Unknown • Unknown	5–3	2–2	1–0
5	April	vs Ohio	Unknown • Unknown	3–2	3–2	2–0
6	April	vs Western Reserve	Unknown • Unknown	15–2	4–2	3–0
7	April	vs Western Reserve	Unknown • Unknown	3–1	5–2	4–0
8	April	vs Kent State	Unknown • Unknown	14–2	6–2	5–0
9	April	vs Kent State	Unknown • Unknown	12–2	7–2	6–0

May (5–1)

#	Date	Opponent	Site/stadium	Score	Overall record	MAC record
10	May 5	Notre Dame	Hyames Field • Kalamazoo, Michigan	4–0	8–2	6–0
11	May	vs Toledo	Unknown • Unknown	4–1	9–2	7–0
12	May 15	at Notre Dame	Unknown • Notre Dame, Indiana	10–8	10–2	7–0
13	May 16	vs Naval Station Great Lakes	Unknown • Unknown	9–7	11–2	7–0
14	May 18	vs Cincinnati	Unknown • Unknown	9–2	12–2	8–0
15	May	vs Naval Station Great Lakes	Unknown • Unknown	5–7	12–3	8–0

June (1–1)

#	Date	Opponent	Site/stadium	Score	Overall record	MAC record
16	June 6	Michigan State	Hyames Field • Kalamazoo, Michigan	8–1	13–3	8–0
17	June 7	at Michigan State	Old College Field • East Lansing, Michigan	2–11	13–4	8–0

Postseason
District IV Playoff (4–1)

#	Date	Opponent	Site/stadium	Score	Overall record	MAC record
18	June	vs Wisconsin	Illinois Field • Champaign, Illinois	5–2	14–4	8–0
19	June	vs Wisconsin	Illinois Park • Champaign, Illinois	4–5	14–5	8–0
20	June	vs Wisconsin	Illinois Park • Champaign, Illinois	4–3	15–5	8–0
21	June	vs Illinois	Illinois Park • Champaign, Illinois	8–2	16–5	8–0
22	June	vs Illinois	Illinois Park • Champaign, Illinois	1–0	17–5	8–0

College World Series (2–2)

#	Date	Opponent	Site/stadium	Score	Overall record	MAC record
23	June 12	vs Holy Cross	Omaha Municipal Stadium • Omaha, Nebraska	1–5	17–6	8–0
24	June 13	vs Colorado State	Omaha Municipal Stadium • Omaha, Nebraska	8–6	18–6	8–0
25	June 14	vs Duke	Omaha Municipal Stadium • Omaha, Nebraska	5–1	19–6	8–0
26	June 15	vs Holy Cross	Omaha Municipal Stadium • Omaha, Nebraska	3–15	19–7	8–0

== Awards and honors ==
Jack Baldwin

- Second Team All-MAC

Tom Cole

- First Team All-MAC

Dave Gottschalk

- First Team All-MAC

Bill Hayes

- First Team All-MAC

Len Johnston

- First Team All-MAC

Bob Urda

- Second Team All-MAC
