= Louisville Colonels (minor league baseball) =

- 1901–1972; (1901–1962, 1968–1972); Louisville, Kentucky
Team logo
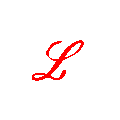
Cap insignia

Minor league affiliations
- Class: Triple-A (1946–1962, 1968–1972); Double-A (1908–1945); Class A (1902–1907)
- League: International League (1968–1972): American Association (1902–1962); Western Association (1901)

Major league affiliations
- Team: Boston Red Sox (1968–1972); Milwaukee Braves (1959–1962); Baltimore Orioles (1958); Washington Senators (1956); Boston Red Sox (1939–1955); Pittsburgh Pirates (1936–1938)

Minor league titles
- Class titles (5): 1921; 1939; 1945; 1954; 1960
- League titles (15): 1909; 1916; 1921; 1925; 1926; 1930; 1939; 1940; 1944; 1945; 1946; 1954; 1960; 1961; 1962

Team data
- Name: Louisville Colonels (1901–1962, 1968–1972)
- Ballpark: Fairgrounds Stadium (1957–1962, 1968–1972); Parkway Field (1923–1956); Eclipse Park III (1902–1922)

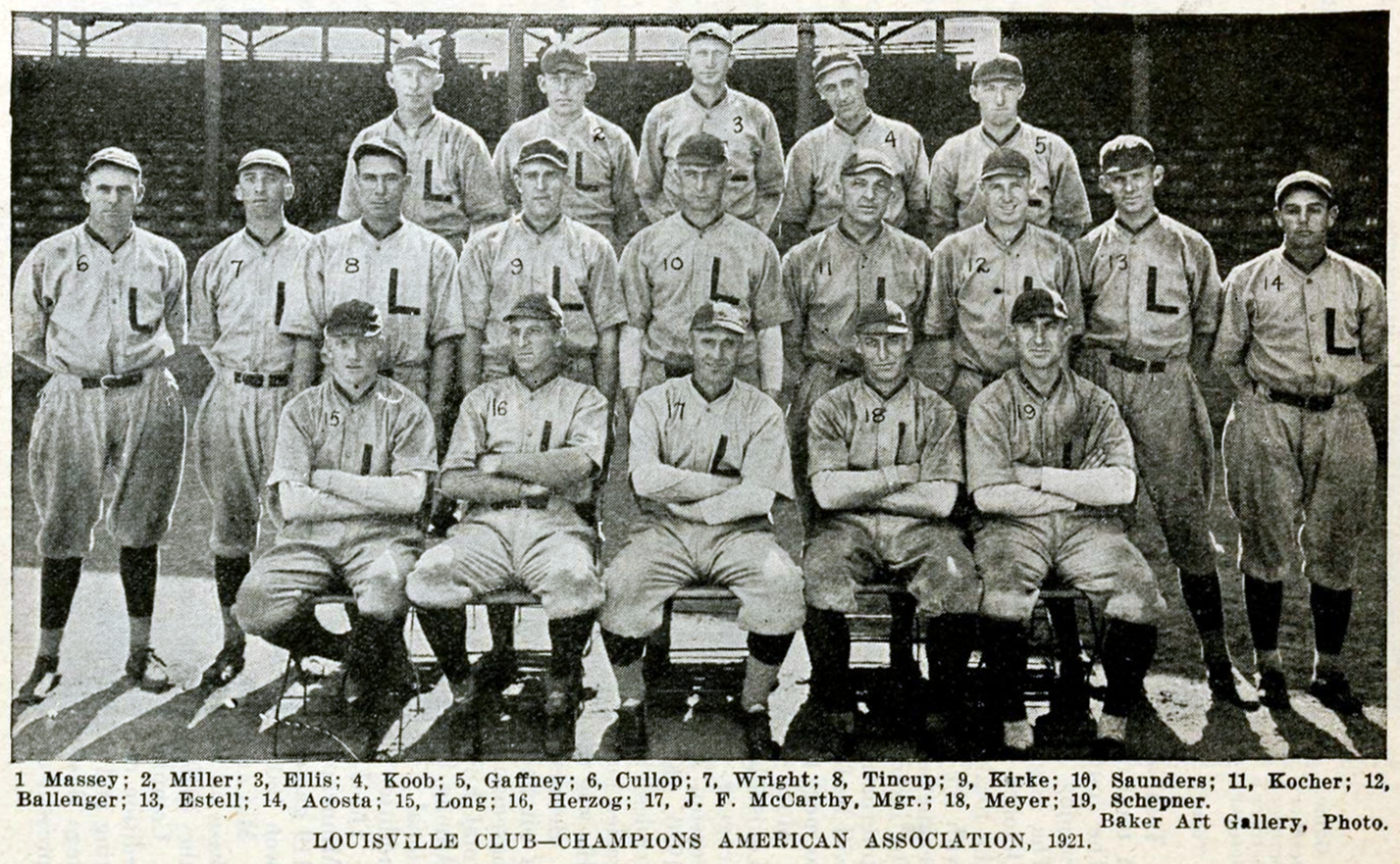
The Louisville Colonels (shown in 1921) won 15 American Association championships, more than any other team.

The Louisville Colonels were a Minor League Baseball team that played in Louisville, Kentucky, from 1901 to 1962 and 1968 to 1972. The name, like that of the 19th century Major League team of that name, is derived from the historic Kentucky colonels.

== History ==
In the 20th century, several Minor League Baseball teams in Louisville, Kentucky, have been known as the Louisville Colonels. In 1909, the Colonels won the American Association pennant, as they also did in 1921, 1925, 1926, and 1930 while featuring players such as Joe McCarthy, Billy Herman, and Earle Combs; Combs hit .344 in 1923 and .380 in 1924 before joining the New York Yankees in 1925. Pee Wee Reese was a rookie with the 1938 Colonels. The Colonels were one of few minor league teams to play throughout World War II, and they won pennants in 1944 and 1945. In 1944, the Colonels played in the Junior World Series against the Baltimore Orioles, and the game drew an attendance of 52,833 — 16,265 more than any single World Series game that year. Through the 1940s and 1950s, the Colonels were part of the Boston Red Sox farm system, and they won the pennant in 1954. The Red Sox transferred its affiliation to the San Francisco Seals after the 1955 season.

Starting in 1956, the Colonels were affiliated with the Washington Senators. They moved to Fairgrounds Stadium in 1957. In 1959, the Colonels became affiliated with the Milwaukee Braves. They won (in 1960, with pitcher Phil Niekro) one of three appearances in the Junior World Series in that time, but in 1962 the American Association folded.

In October 1967, Walter J. Dilbeck purchased the Toronto Maple Leafs of the International League and moved them to Louisville, renaming them the Colonels. They played in the International League through the 1972 season. During this stretch, players included Carlton Fisk, Dwight Evans, Luis Tiant, and Cecil Cooper. The franchise had to move when the Kentucky State Fair Board announced that Fairgrounds Stadium would be renovated for football in a manner that would make it unsuitable for baseball. The team relocated to Pawtucket, Rhode Island, and became known as the Pawtucket Red Sox. Baseball returned to Louisville when the same stadium was renovated for baseball in 1981 and the Springfield Redbirds came to Louisville as the Louisville Redbirds, later called the Louisville Bats, setting minor league attendance records and outdrawing several major league teams.

== Notable former players ==
- Pee Wee Reese – Major League Baseball All-Star shortstop with the Brooklyn/Los Angeles Dodgers
- Goody Rosen – Major League Baseball All-Star outfielder
- Joe Tanner - inventor of the Tanner Tee
- Amado Samuel - Major League Baseball shortstop for Milwaukee Braves/New York Mets

== See also ==
- Louisville Grays
- Sports in Louisville, Kentucky

Preceded by Toronto Maple Leafs	Boston Red Sox; Triple-A affiliate 1968–1972	Succeeded by Pawtucket Red Sox
Preceded by Class established	Boston Red Sox; Triple-A affiliate 1946–1955 (with Toronto Maple Leafs, 1947)	Succeeded by San Francisco Seals (Open Classification)
Preceded by Minneapolis Millers	Boston Red Sox; Double-A affiliate 1939–1945	Succeeded by New Orleans Pelicans
