= 1952 Texas Longhorns baseball team =

American college baseball season

1952 Texas Longhorns baseball

SWC champions

College World Series, 1–2
- Conference: Southwest Conference
- Record: 19–9 (11–4 SWC)
- Head coach: Bibb Falk (10th year)
- Home stadium: Clark Field

1952 Southwest Conference baseball standings
	Conf.				Overall
Team	W		L	PCT	W		L	PCT
Texas ‍†‍‍^{y}	11	–	4	.733	19	–	9	.679
Baylor ‍‍‍	9	–	6	.600	9	–	6	.600
TCU ‍‍‍	8	–	7	.533	13	–	12	.520
SMU ‍‍‍	6	–	9	.400	13	–	11	.542
Texas A&M ‍‍‍	6	–	9	.400	10	–	19	.345
Rice ‍‍‍	5	–	10	.333	12	–	13	.480
† – Conference champion y – Invited to the College World Series; As of June 30, 1952; Rankings from Collegiate Baseball

The 1952 Texas Longhorns baseball team represented the University of Texas at Austin in the 1952 NCAA baseball season. The Longhorns played their home games at Clark Field. The team was coached by Bibb Falk in his 10th season at Texas.

The Longhorns reached the College World Series, but were eliminated by eventual champion Holy Cross in the quarterfinal.

== Personnel ==
=== Roster ===
1952 Texas Longhorns roster
Pitchers Catchers: - Randy Biesenbach; - Ronald E. Spradlin	Infielders: - Paul Covey Mohr; Outfielders: - Travis A. Eckert	Unknown: - Harry Lenox Bengtson; - Cliff Gustafson; - Verne Carl Huser; - Roy Ernest Kelly; - Walter Eugene Oden; - Jimmy Dan Pace; - Dick Roberson; - Luther Scarborough; - Joe Henry Tanner; - Robert L. Towery; - Riley Verdine

=== Coaches ===
1952 Texas Longhorns baseball coaching staff
- Bibb Falk – Head coach – 10th year

== Schedule and results ==
Legend
Texas win
Texas loss

1952 Texas Longhorns baseball game log
Regular season

March
Date	Opponent	Site/stadium	Score	Overall record	SWC record
Mar 15	at Baylor*	Waco, TX	L 5–8	0–1	
Mar 18	at Baylor*	Waco, TX	L 5–6	0–2	
Mar 21	Oklahoma*	Clark Field • Austin, TX	W 13–4	1–2	
Mar 22	Oklahoma*	Clark Field • Austin, TX	W 15–4	2–2	
Mar 25	Hardin–Simmons*	Clark Field • Austin, TX	W 10–4	3–2	
Mar 26	Minnesota*	Clark Field • Austin, TX	W 5–0^{5}	4–2	
Mar 28	at SMU	Dallas, TX	W 5–2	5–2	1–0
Mar 29	at SMU	Dallas, TX	L 2–5	5–3	1–1

April
Date	Opponent	Site/stadium	Score	Overall record	SWC record
Apr 1	Rice	Clark Field • Austin, TX	W 6–5	6–3	2–1
Apr 5	at TCU	Fort Worth, TX	W 2–1	7–3	3–1
Apr 8	at Texas A&M	Kyle Baseball Field • College Station, TX	L 8–13	7–4	3–2
Apr 15	Sam Houston State*	Clark Field • Austin, TX	W 13–3	8–4	
Apr 18	Baylor	Clark Field • Austin, TX	W 3–2	9–4	4–2
Apr 25	at Rice	Houston, TX	W 13–7	10–4	5–2
Apr 26	at Rice	Houston, TX	W 7–3	11–4	6–2
Apr 28	SMU	Clark Field • Austin, TX	W 6–3	12–4	7–2

May
Date	Opponent	Site/stadium	Score	Overall record	SWC record
May 3	at Baylor	Waco, TX	W 17–3	13–4	8–2
May 3	at Baylor	Waco, TX	L 5–9	13–5	8–3
May 9	TCU	Clark Field • Austin, TX	W 7–2	14–5	9–3
May 10	TCU	Clark Field • Austin, TX	W 21–6	15–5	10–3
May 15	Texas A&M	Clark Field • Austin, TX	W 5–0	16–5	11–3
May 16	Texas A&M	Clark Field • Austin, TX	L 2–3	16–6	11–4

Postseason

District 6 playoffs
Date	Opponent	Site/stadium	Score	Overall record	Playoff record
June 6	Arizona	Clark Field • Austin, TX	W 3–1	17–6	1–0
June 6	Arizona	Clark Field • Austin, TX	L 0–1	17–7	1–1
June 7	Arizona	Clark Field • Austin, TX	W 15–8	18–7	2–1

College World Series
Date	Opponent	Site/stadium	Score	Overall record	CWS record
June 12	Penn State	Johnny Rosenblatt Stadium • Omaha, NE	L 3–5	18–8	0–1
June 13	Oregon State	Johnny Rosenblatt Stadium • Omaha, NE	W 10–1	19–8	1–1
June 14	Holy Cross	Johnny Rosenblatt Stadium • Omaha, NE	L 1–2	19–9	1–2
