= 1952 Penn State Nittany Lions baseball team =

American college baseball season

1952 Penn State Nittany Lions baseball

College World Series, T-3rd
- Conference: Independent
- Record: 17–6
- Head coach: Joe Bedenk (22nd season)
- Captain: Silvio Cerchie
- Home stadium: Beaver Field

The 1952 Penn State Nittany Lions baseball team represented Pennsylvania State University in the 1952 NCAA baseball season. The head coach was Joe Bedenk, serving his 22nd year.

The Nittany Lions lost in the College World Series, defeated by the Holy Cross.

== Roster ==
1952 Penn State Nittany Lions baseball team
Players
Coaches

| # | Pos. | Name | B/T | Height | Weight | Year | Home town |
|---|---|---|---|---|---|---|---|
| | | Silvio Cerchie (C) | / | — | — | Jr |
| | | Donald Cook | / | — | — |
| | P | Bill Everson | / | — | — |
| | | Garland Gingerich | / | — | — | So |
| | LHP | Bill Hopper | L/L | 5 ft 10 in (1.78 m) | 175 lb (79 kg) | Sr | Crafton, Pennsylvania |
| | INF | Michael Hunchar | / | — | — |
| | INF | Huber Kline | / | — | — |
| | P | Jack Krumrine | / | — | — |
| | | William Leonard | / | — | — |
| | | William Mihalich | / | — | — |
| | P | John Moore | / | — | — |
| | | Paul Mowry | / | — | — |
| | | Jack Rhoda | / | — | — |
| | | Robert Schoellkopf | / | — | — | So |
| | | Christopher Tonery | / | — | — | Sr |
| | INF | Carmen Troisi | S/ | 5 ft 9 in (1.75 m) | 165 lb (75 kg) | Sr | Philadelphia, Pennsylvania |
| | | Troy | / | — | — | So |
| | P | Keith Vesling | / | — | — | So |
| | INF | Ronald Weidenhammer | R/R | 6 ft 1 in (1.85 m) | 180 lb (82 kg) | | Kutztown, Pennsylvania |
| | | Tom Werner | R/ | 5 ft 10 in (1.78 m) | 175 lb (79 kg) | So |
| | | Wolfinger | / | — | — | So |
| | | Yanosich | / | — | — | So |

Head coach

Joe Bedenk

Assistant coach(es)

Chuck Medlar

Legend

- (C) Team captain
- (S) Suspended
- (I) Ineligible
- Injured
- Current redshirt

== Schedule ==
1952 Penn State Nittany Lions baseball game log
Regular season
April (9–0)

| # | Date | Opponent | Site/stadium | Score | Overall record |
|---|---|---|---|---|---|
| 1 | April 11 | at American | Unknown • Washington, D. C. | 20–1 | 1–0 |
| 2 | April 12 | at Georgetown | Unknown • Washington, D. C. | 18–5 | 2–0 |
| 3 | April 12 | at Georgetown | Unknown • Washington, D. C. | 8–4 | 3–0 |
| 4 | April 16 | Western Maryland | New Beaver Field • University Park, Pennsylvania | 9–4 | 4–0 |
| 5 | April 19 | West Virginia | New Beaver Field • University Park, Pennsylvania | 4–2 | 5–0 |
| 6 | April 19 | West Virginia | New Beaver Field • University Park, Pennsylvania | 6–2 | 6–0 |
| 7 | April 22 | Bucknell | New Beaver Field • University Park, Pennsylvania | 15–4 | 7–0 |
| 8 | April 26 | Lafayette | New Beaver Field • University Park, Pennsylvania | 5–0 | 8–0 |
| 9 | April 28 | Gettysburg | New Beaver Field • University Park, Pennsylvania | 2–1 | 9–0 |

May (4–4)

| # | Date | Opponent | Site/stadium | Score | Overall record |
|---|---|---|---|---|---|
| 10 | May 2 | at Rutgers | New Beaver Field • University Park, Pennsylvania | 11–5 | 10–0 |
| 11 | May 5 | at Villanova | McGeehan Field • Villanova, Pennsylvania | 1–12 | 10–1 |
| 12 | May 6 | at Navy | Unknown • Annapolis, Maryland | 2–4 | 10–2 |
| 13 | May 9 | at Pittsburgh | Unknown • Pittsburgh, Pennsylvania | 6–8 | 10–3 |
| 14 | May 10 | at Pittsburgh | Unknown • Pittsburgh, Pennsylvania | 4–1 | 11–3 |
| 15 | May 16 | at Dickinson | Unknown • Carlisle, Pennsylvania | 12–1 | 12–3 |
| 16 | May 17 | at Penn | River Field • Philadelphia, Pennsylvania | 3–4 | 12–4 |
| 17 | May 21 | at Bucknell | Unknown • Lewisburg, Pennsylvania | 7–4 | 13–4 |

Postseason
District II Tournament (2–0)

| # | Date | Opponent | Site/stadium | Score | Overall record |
|---|---|---|---|---|---|
| 18 | June 5 | Fordham | New Beaver Field • University Park, Pennsylvania | 13–4 | 14–4 |
| 19 | June 6 | Villanova | New Beaver Field • University Park, Pennsylvania | 9–6 | 15–4 |

1952 College World Series (2–2)

| # | Date | Opponent | Site/stadium | Score | Overall record |
|---|---|---|---|---|---|
| 20 | June 12 | vs Texas | Johnny Rosenblatt Stadium • Omaha, Nebraska | 5–3 | 16–4 |
| 21 | June 13 | vs Duke | Johnny Rosenblatt Stadium • Omaha, Nebraska | 12–7 | 17–4 |
| 22 | June 14 | vs Missouri | Johnny Rosenblatt Stadium • Omaha, Nebraska | 2–3 | 17–5 |
| 23 | June 15 | vs Holy Cross | Johnny Rosenblatt Stadium • Omaha, Nebraska | 4–15 | 17–6 |
