= Goss Stadium at Coleman Field =

College baseball stadium in Corvallis, Oregon

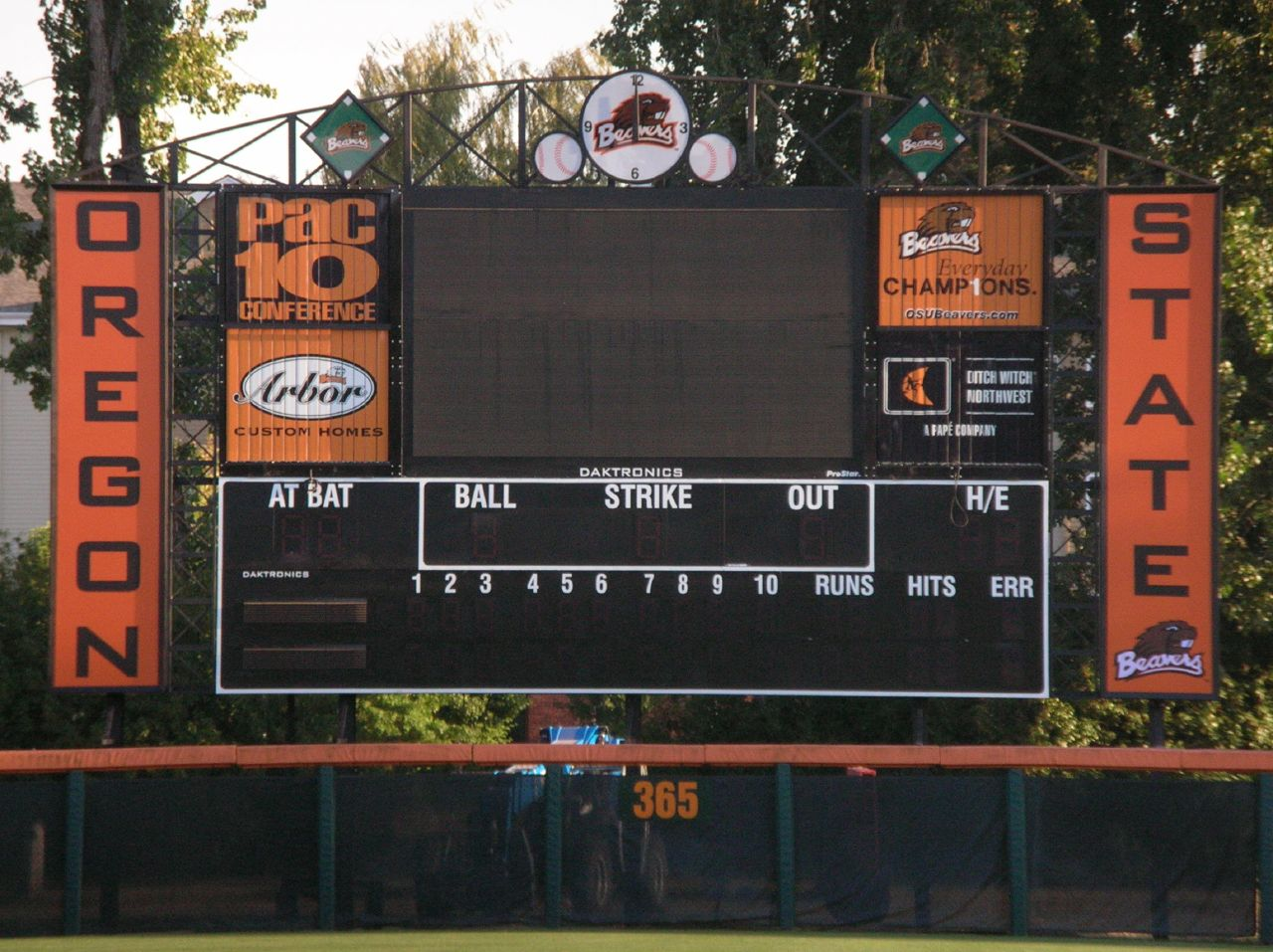
- New scoreboard in October 2006

- Location in the United States Location in Oregon
- Interactive map of Goss Stadium at Coleman Field
- Former names: Coleman Field (196x–1999)
- Address: 430 SW Langton Place
- Location: Oregon State University; Corvallis, Oregon, U.S.
- Coordinates: 44.5632°N 123.2776°W
- Owner: Oregon State University
- Operator: Oregon State University
- Capacity: 3,587
- Surface: Infield; FieldTurf (2007–present); Grass (1907–2006); Outfield; FieldTurf (2015); Grass (1907–2014)
- Record attendance: 4,408 (vs. Florida State; June 7, 2025)
- Field size: Left: 330 ft (101 m); L. Center: 365 ft (111 m); Center: 400 ft (122 m); R. Center: 365 ft (111 m); Right: 330 ft (101 m)

Construction
- Opened: 1907; 119 years ago (field); 1999 (stadium)
- Renovated: 1999, 2009, 2015, 2019
- Expanded: May 2008; February 2015; February 2019
- Cost: $2.3 million (1999 renovation) $3 million (2015 renovation)

Tenants
- Oregon State Beavers (NCAA) (1907–present); Corvallis Knights (WCL) (2007–present)

Website
- OSU Beavers baseball

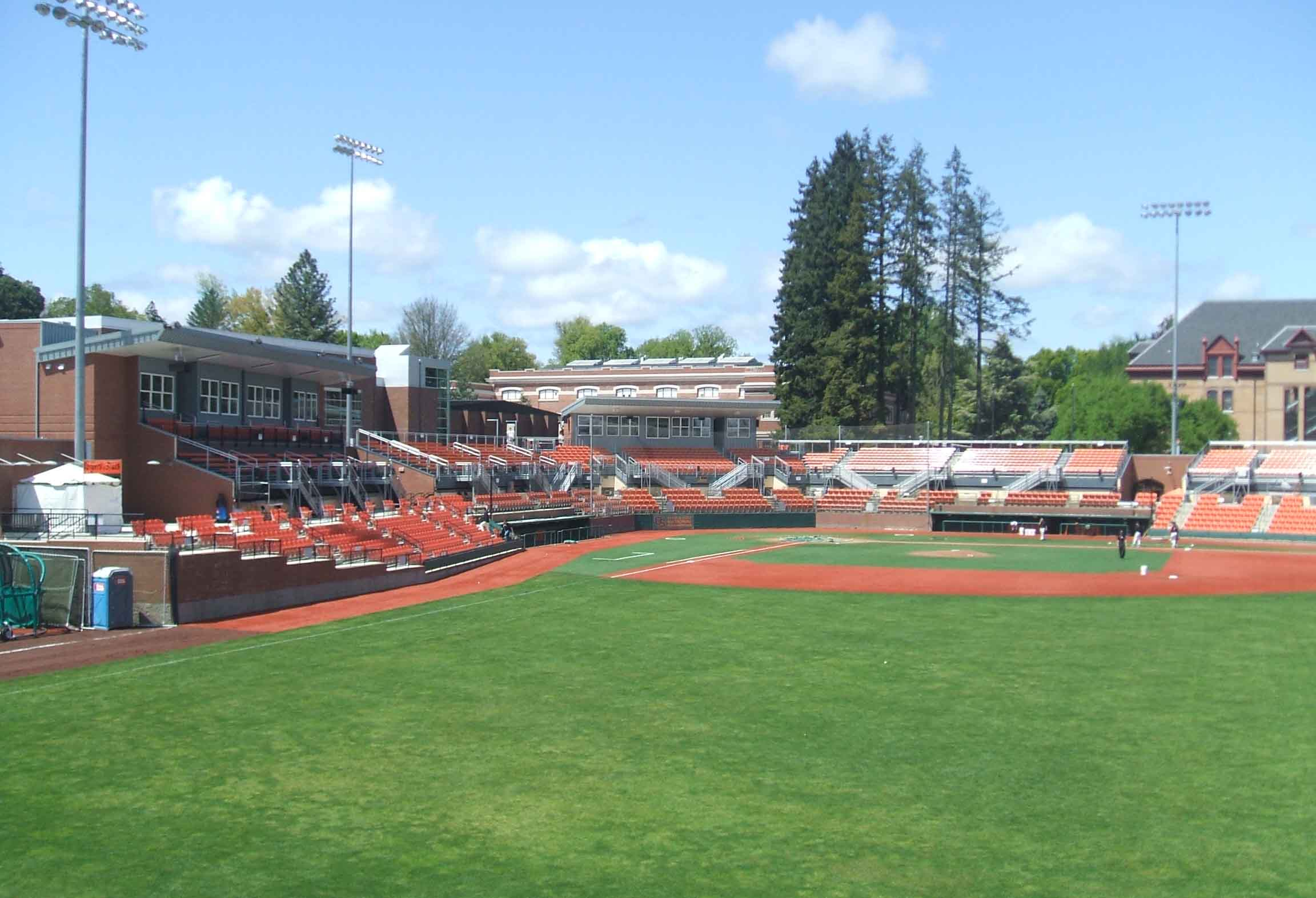
Goss Stadium in May 2009 (home plate area still dirt)

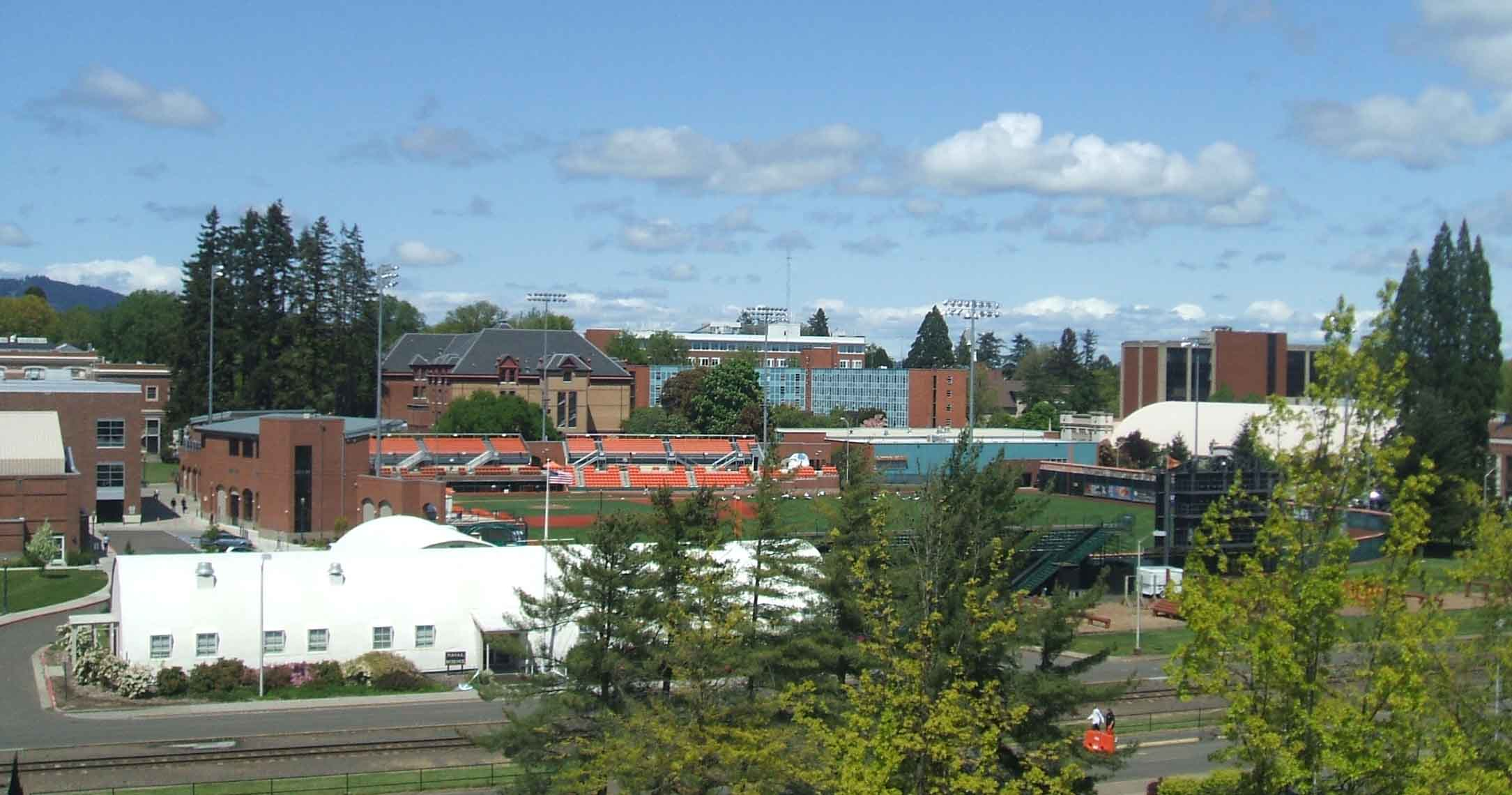
Goss Stadium in May 2009

Goss Stadium at Coleman Field is a college baseball park in the northwest United States. Opened in 1907, it is located on the campus of Oregon State University in Corvallis, Oregon. It is home to the Oregon State Beavers of the Pac-12 Conference and named after long-time former coach Ralph Coleman. It has a capacity of 3,587 and uses FieldTurf for the surface.

== History ==
The field was established in 119 years ago in 1907, with the first game on April 12. The baseball diamond was later named "Ralph Coleman Field" for the head coach who stepped down after 35 years following the 1966 season. However, it had been informally referred to as Coleman field as early as 1937. At that time, the field was used for an annual alumni bonfire. By 1942 the baseball field was referred to by media as Coleman field.

In 1964, the school floated plans to move the baseball stadium to the west of Parker Stadium (now Reser Stadium) and build dugouts and other permanent structurers as part of the project. The stadium was rededicated in 1981 after improvements during the prior offseason. The Scott Halbrook Memorial Scoreboard was added to Ralph Coleman Field in 1986 in memory of the 1981 freshman outfielder, who died in a freak accident just three days prior to his first season with the Beavers. The scoreboard remained in use until its replacement in 2006.

In the late fall of 1998, after many years of talks regarding upgrading the bleachers, concession stands, and the press box, a major remodel was undertaken, in large part due to a $2.3 million donation by John and Eline Goss. Completed before the start of the 1999 season, the addition of the all new stadium put to rest the idea that the Beavers may not be able to continue to play at their longtime home. With the field located in the middle of campus, there had been discussion of the land being turned over to academic uses. The first official game at Goss Stadium at Coleman field was played March 12, 1999.

Lights were added to the stadium in 2002, allowing the Beavers to play their first night game at home on April 27, a 4–1 victory over the fourth-ranked Stanford Cardinal. In the summer of 2006, after the Beavers' first national championship, a state-of-the-art scoreboard was installed, replacing the Scott Halbrook Memorial Scoreboard. This scoreboard featured the first video replay screen in the conference. The natural grass (and dirt) infield was replaced with FieldTurf in late 2006, in time for the 2007 season. The pitcher's mound and home plate area were the only portions that remained dirt. The basepaths and "skin" portion are FieldTurf, colored dark orange. The home plate area at Goss Stadium was later covered with FieldTurf, leaving only the pitcher's mound with dirt.

In May 2008, the Goss Stadium expansion project which consisted of extending the stadium down the 1st and 3rd baselines, was completed. This expansion raised the capacity from 2,000 to 3,248 spectators. The Omaha Room, a suite overlooking the field along the first base line, was built during the expansion project. An academic center as well as the Oregon State Baseball Hall of Fame area were also added and are housed underneath the Omaha Room suite.

The official stadium capacity is currently at 3,587. In the 2013 season, home games averaged 2,676 fans per game (24th best among Division I baseball programs) as the Beavers tied an all-time season best 27–5 record at home.

In 2014, former Oregon State center fielder and MLB All-Star, Jacoby Ellsbury, donated $1 million as part of a $3 million renovation project. Construction was completed in February 2015 adding a beer garden standing deck for fans above a new home team locker room. Also in the winter of 2015, new FieldTurf was installed that covered the entire field, from the backstop to the outfield fence, removing the last remaining natural turf from Coleman Field. The only natural surface remaining was the dirt pitchers mound.

Prior to the start of the 2016 season, the existing scoreboard was removed to accommodate the upgrade which will replace all existing scoreboard elements with one large LED videoboard that is projected to be twice as large from its predecessor.

The facility has hosted 13 NCAA Regional Tournaments (1952, 1963, 2005, 2006, 2011, 2013, 2014, 2017, 2018, 2019, 2022, 2024, 2025), as well as 8 NCAA Super-Regional Tournaments (2005, 2006, 2007, 2013, 2017, 2018, 2022, 2025). As of 2025, Oregon State has posted a mark of 46–12 in postseason games at Goss Stadium at Coleman Field.

== Facility ==
Opened over a century ago, Coleman Field is located near the center of campus and is the oldest continuous ballpark in the nation. The south end is bordered by SW Washington Way, with Dixon Recreation Center to the west, McAlexander Fieldhouse to the east, and several academic halls to the north.

The playing field has an unorthodox alignment, with the batter and catcher facing southeast, resulting in difficult visual conditions for the fielders on the left side of the diamond for games played near sunset. (The recommended orientation of a baseball diamond is east-northeast.) The field's elevation is approximately 240 feet (75 m) above sea level.

Since 2007, the stadium is the home field of the Corvallis Knights of the West Coast League, a collegiate wood bat summer league.

== See also ==
- List of NCAA Division I baseball venues

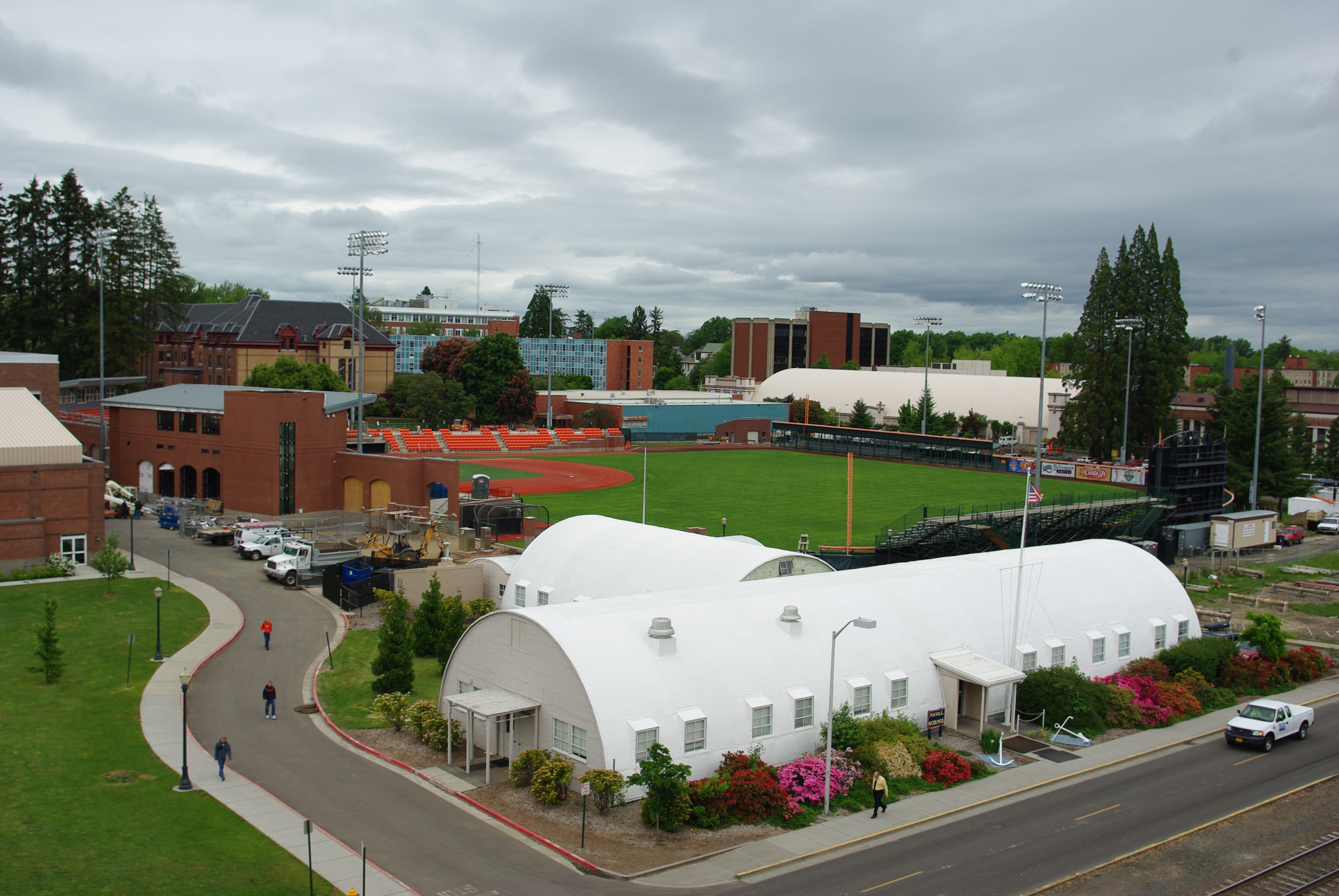
View of the stadium (still under construction)
