= Ralph Coleman (baseball) =

- Ralph Coleman in 1938

Biographical details
- Born: November 30, 1895; Canby, Oregon, U.S.
- Died: July 8, 1990 (aged 94); Corvallis, Oregon, U.S.

Playing career
- 1918: Oregon State
- Position: Pitcher

Coaching career (HC unless noted)
- 1923–1928: Oregon State
- 1930–1931: Oregon State
- 1938–1966: Oregon State

Head coaching record
- Overall: 561–316–1

Accomplishments and honors

Championships
- conference titles in 1925, 1927, 1938, 1940, 1943, 1951, 1952, 1958, 1962, 1963

Ralph O. Coleman (November 30, 1895 – July 8, 1990 ) was a college baseball coach at Oregon State University for 35 years.

== Early life ==
Coleman was born in Canby, Oregon in 1895 and graduated from Canby High School. He attended Oregon Agricultural College (later renamed Oregon State University), where he lettered in track for three years before trying baseball in his senior year of 1918. After serving in World War I, he pitched for the Portland Beavers of the Pacific Coast League and was offered a tryout with the Detroit Tigers, but opted instead for the head baseball coaching job at his alma mater. His younger brother Ed also played for the Beavers and went on to the major leagues.

== Coaching career ==
Nicknamed The Silver Fox, Coleman remained the Beavers' head coach for 35 seasons: from 1923 to 1928, from 1930 to 1931, and from 1938 to 1966. His tenure was broken several times by other campus duties. Under Coleman's tenure, the Beavers had an overall record of 561–316–1 and finished first in the Northern Division 10 times. Coleman coached the Beavers to its first appearance in the College World Series in 1952, but the team lost its games to Duke and Texas.

== Legacy ==
In 1968, he was named to the American Baseball Coaches Association Hall of Fame. He was inducted into the Oregon Sports Hall of Fame in 1981, the same year that Oregon State's baseball stadium was renamed Coleman Field in his honor. (It was later renamed Goss Stadium at Coleman Field when it was upgraded in 1999 with major donations from the Goss family.) He died in 1990, and was inducted into the OSU Sports Hall of Fame later that same year.
