= Jack Coombs Field =

Baseball park at Duke University

- Coombs Field
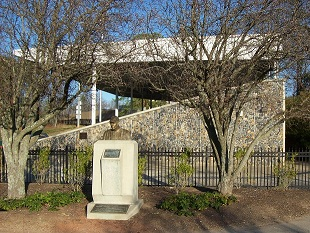
- Jack Coombs Field
- Interactive map of Jack Coombs Field
- Location: Whitford Drive, Durham, North Carolina, USA
- Coordinates: 35.9983°N 78.9443°W
- Owner: Duke University
- Capacity: 2,000
- Surface: AstroTurf GameDay Grass 3D 60H
- Scoreboard: Yes
- Field size: Left Field – 325 feet (99 m); Left Center Field – 370 feet (110 m) (not posted); Center Field – 400 feet (120 m); Right Center Field – 375 feet (114 m) (not posted); Right Field – 335 feet (102 m)

Construction
- Opened: 1931
- Renovated: 2001, 2011, 2024

Tenant
- Duke Blue Devils (NCAA) (1931–present)

Jack Coombs Field is a baseball stadium in Durham, North Carolina, USA. It is the home field of the Duke Blue Devils baseball team.

The stadium holds 2,000 people. Built in 1931, it was named in 1951 for former Duke baseball coach Jack Coombs. The field itself was first used in 1931. The stonework on the grandstand exterior suggests the Neo-Gothic architectural design used with most of the West Campus buildings.

The ballpark stands in the western portion of the athletic complex on Duke's West Campus. It is bounded by Science Drive (northwest, left and center fields); Whitford Drive (southwest - left field, third base, and home plate); Krzyzewski Center (east, first base); and a service road (northeast, center and right fields).

== Renovations ==
In 2001, an indoor hitting facility was added.

Prior to the 2011 season, an AstroTurf surface was installed at the field, allowing for greater flexibility in the program's use of the venue. In addition, minor changes were made to the field's fences, lights, and dimensions. The stadium was custom fit with Promats Athletics wall padding, netting system, and foul poles.

Prior to the 2025 season, the dugouts and bullpens were rebuilt, the turf surface was replaced, and the walls were brought in.

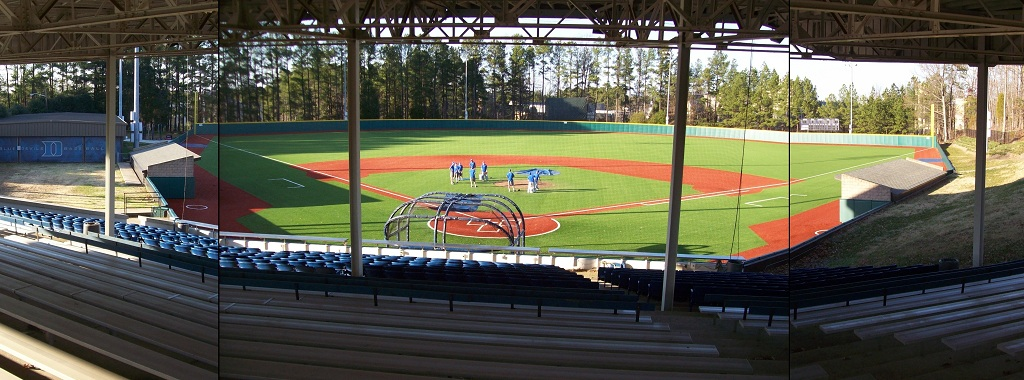
Jack Coombs Field triptych

== See also ==
- List of NCAA Division I baseball venues
