= 1952 Southern Conference baseball tournament =

- Teams: 4
- Format: Double-elimination tournament
- Finals site: Raleigh, North Carolina
- Champions: Duke (2nd title)
- Winning coach: Jack Coombs (2nd title)

1952 Southern Conference baseball standings
	Conf.				Overall
Team	W		L	PCT	W		L	PCT
Northern
Richmond ^{x}‍‍‍	6	–	2	.750	13	–	6	.684
George Washington ‍‍‍	7	–	3	.700		–		–
West Virginia ‍‍‍	7	–	3	.700		–		–
Washington and Lee ‍‍‍	6	–	5	.545		–		–
William & Mary ‍‍‍	5	–	6	.455		–		–
Maryland ‍‍‍	4	–	6	.400	11	–	9	.550
Virginia Tech ‍‍‍	3	–	6	.333	4	–	9	.308
VMI ‍‍‍	1	–	8	.111		–		–
Southern
Duke ^{x}‍‍‡‍	18	–	3	.857	31	–	7	.816
NC State ‍‍‍	10	–	5	.667		–		–
North Carolina ‍‍‍	10	–	7	.588	18	–	10	.643
South Carolina ‍‍‍	8	–	7	.533		–		–
Clemson ‍‍‍	10	–	10	.500	10	–	12	.455
Wake Forest ‍‍‍	7	–	11	.389	13	–	12	.520
Furman ‍‍‍	6	–	11	.353		–		–
Davidson ‍‍‍	3	–	9	.250		–		–
The Citadel ‍‍‍	3	–	12	.200		–		–
x – Division champion ‡ – Tournament champion As of June 30, 1952; Rankings from Collegiate Baseball

The 1952 Southern Conference baseball tournament was held in Raleigh, North Carolina, from May 15 to May 18. The South Division's top seed Duke won their second tournament title. Duke coach Jack Coombs spent the tournament in the hospital with a kidney ailment. He would retire after the school year.

== Seeding ==
The top two teams from each division participated in the tournament. The table below represents the most complete conference standings available, but the teams below all fielded baseball teams within the Southern Conference.

Team	W	L	PCT	GB	Seed
North Division
Richmond	6	2	.750	–	1S
George Washington	7	3	.700	–	2N
West Virginia	7	3	.700	–	–
Washington and Lee	6	5	.545	1.5	–
William & Mary	5	6	.455	2.5	–
Maryland	4	6	.400	3	–
Virginia Tech	3	6	.300	3.5	–
VMI	1	8	.111	5.5	–
South Division
Duke	18	3	.857	–	1S
NC State	10	5	.667	5	2S
North Carolina	10	7	.588	6	–
South Carolina	8	7	.533	7	–
Clemson	10	10	.500	7.5	–
Wake Forest	7	11	.389	9.5	–
Furman	6	11	.353	10	–
Davidson	3	9	.250	10.5	–
The Citadel	3	12	.200	12	–

== Bracket ==
First round
1N	Richmond
2S	NC State
1S	Duke	7
2N	George Washington	5
Lower round 1
1N	Richmond
2N	George Washington

Semi-finals
2S	NC State	5
1S	Duke	4
Lower final
1S	Duke	8
2N	George Washington	4

Finals
2S	NC State	0	3
1S	Duke	7	8
