= James O'Neill (baseball) =

American baseball player

James P. O'Neill (died March 3, 1993) was an American baseball and basketball player for the College of the Holy Cross. He won the College World Series Most Outstanding Player award for his performance during the 1952 College World Series.

== Baseball ==
Before College, James attended St Charles Preparatory School in Columbus Ohio, notching 5 no-hitters for their baseball team. O'Neill notched a career 17-6 record as a pitcher for the Holy Cross Crusaders baseball team. He pitched three complete-game victories in six days to lead Holy Cross to victory in the 1952 College World Series. He was the first pitcher to win three games in a single College World Series. He was named starting pitching on the 1952 College Baseball All-America Team. He was inducted into the College of the Holy Cross Hall of Fame in 1980.

== Basketball ==
O'Neill played on the Holy Cross Crusaders men's basketball team from 1949 to 1952. He averaged 1.5 points per game for the Bob Cousy-led Crusader team that tied the school record for wins (27) and played in the 1950 NCAA basketball tournament. He average 5.6 points per game and 7.6 rebounds per game as a junior and 6.2 points per game as a senior.
