= Footer Johnson =

American baseball player (1932–2024)

- Pinch hitter
- Born: February 15, 1932; Dayton, Ohio, U.S.
- Died: March 10, 2024 (aged 92); Mesa, Arizona, U.S.
- Batted: Left Threw: Left

MLB debut
- July 22, 1958, for the Chicago Cubs

Last MLB appearance
- July 30, 1958, for the Chicago Cubs

MLB statistics
- Batting average: .000
- Games played: 8
- Runs scored: 1
- Stats at Baseball Reference

Teams
- Chicago Cubs (1958)

Richard Allan "Footer" Johnson (February 15, 1932 – March 10, 2024) was an American Major League Baseball player. He appeared in eight games for the Chicago Cubs in 1958, five as a pinch hitter and three as a pinch runner. He did not have a hit in his five at-bats, but did score a run during one of his pinch running appearances.

In the minor leagues, Johnson was primarily an outfielder. He played in the minors from 1952 until 1960.

Johnson died on March 10, 2024, at the age of 92.

== Sources ==
- Career statistics from Baseball Reference · Baseball Reference (Minors) · Retrosheet · Baseball Almanac
