= Junior Wren =

American football player (1929–2003)

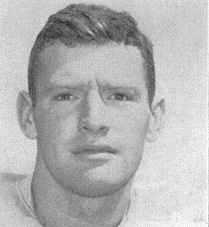

No. 42, 20
- Positions: Safety, cornerback

Personal information
- Born: December 10, 1929; Kansas City, Missouri, U.S.
- Died: October 8, 2003 (aged 73); Miami, Florida, U.S.
- Listed height: 6 ft 0 in (1.83 m)
- Listed weight: 192 lb (87 kg)

Career information
- High school: Central (Kansas City)
- College: Missouri (1948–1951)
- NFL draft: 1952: 24th round, 288th overall pick

Career history

Playing
- Cleveland Browns (1956–1959); Pittsburgh Steelers (1960); New York Titans (1961)

Coaching
- Florida State (1968) Graduate assistant

Awards and highlights
- First-team All-Big Seven (1951); Mizzou Athletics Hall of Fame (1994)

Career NFL/AFL statistics
- Interceptions: 14
- Fumble recoveries: 5
- Punts: 36
- Punting yards: 1,305
- Longest punt: 55
- Stats at Pro Football Reference

Lowe "Junior" Wren (December 10, 1929 – October 8, 2003) was a professional American football defensive back in the National Football League (NFL) and the American Football League (AFL). He played for the NFL's Cleveland Browns (1956–1959) and Pittsburgh Steelers (1960) and the AFL's New York Titans (1961).

In 1968, Wren was hired by Bill Peterson as a graduate assistant for Florida State while he pursued a master's degree in physical education.
