= 1952 College World Series =

1952 NCAA I baseball tournament
- Season: 1952
- Teams: 8
- Finals site: Johnny Rosenblatt Stadium; Omaha, NE
- Champions: Holy Cross (1st title)
- Runner-up: Missouri (1st CWS Appearance)
- Winning coach: Jack Barry (1st title)
- MOP: James O'Neill (Holy Cross)

The 1952 College World Series was the sixth NCAA-sanctioned baseball tournament that determined a national champion. The tournament was held as the conclusion of the 1952 NCAA baseball season and was played at Johnny Rosenblatt Stadium in Omaha, Nebraska from June 12 to June 17. The tournament's champion was the Holy Cross Crusaders, coached by Jack Barry. The Most Outstanding Player was James O'Neill of Holy Cross.

The tournament consisted of no preliminary round of play as teams were selected directly into the College World Series. From 1954 to the present, teams compete in the NCAA Division I baseball tournament preliminary round(s), to determine the eight teams that will play in the College World Series.

== Participants ==
| School | Conference | Record | Head coach | CWS appearances | CWS best finish | CWS record | Berth |
|---|---|---|---|---|---|---|---|
| Colorado State College (Note: Colorado State College is currently known as the University of Northern Colorado. Not to be confused with Colorado State University, then known as Colorado A&M.) | RMC | 15–7 | Pete Butler | 0 (last: none) | none | 0–0 | District VII |
| Duke | Southern | 30–6 | Jack Coombs | 0 (last: none) | none | 0–0 | District III |
| Holy Cross | Independent | 15–2 | Jack Barry | 0 (last: none) | none | 0–0 | District I |
| Missouri | Big 7 | 17–5 | Hi Simmons | 0 (last: none) | none | 0–0 | District V |
| Oregon State | PCC | 27–10 | Ralph Coleman | 0 (last: none) | none | 0–0 | District VIII |
| Penn State | Independent | 15–4 | Joe Bedenk | 0 (last: none) | none | 0–0 | Won District II Playoff |
| Texas | SWC | 18–7 | Bibb Falk | 2 (last: 1950) | 1st (1949, 1950) | 8–1 | District VI |
| Western Michigan | MAC | 16–5 | Charlie Maher | 0 (last: none) | none | 0–0 | District IV |

== Brackets ==
Upper round 1
Penn State | 5
Texas | 3
Duke | 18
Oregon State | 7
Holy Cross | 5
Western Michigan | 1
Missouri | 15
Colorado State College | 1

Upper round 2
Penn State | 12
Duke | 7
Holy Cross | 0
Missouri | 1
Lower round 1
Texas | 10
Oregon State | 1
Western Michigan | 8
Colorado State College | 6

Upper final
Penn State | 2
Missouri | 3
Lower round 2
Holy Cross | 2
Texas | 1
Duke | 1
Western Michigan | 5

Semifinals
Holy Cross | 15
Penn State | 4
Holy Cross | 15
Western Michigan | 3

Final
Missouri | 3 | 4
Holy Cross | 7 | 8

=== Game results ===
| Date | Game | Winner | Score | Loser | Notes |
|---|---|---|---|---|---|
| June 12 | Game 1 | Penn State | 5–3 | Texas | |
| June 12 | Game 2 | Duke | 18–7 | Oregon State | |
| June 12 | Game 3 | Holy Cross | 5–1 | Western Michigan | |
| June 12 | Game 4 | Missouri | 15–1 | Colorado State College | |
| June 13 | Game 5 | Texas | 10–1 | Oregon State | Oregon State eliminated |
| June 13 | Game 6 | Western Michigan | 8–6 | Colorado State College | Colorado State College eliminated |
| June 13 | Game 7 | Penn State | 12–7 | Duke | |
| June 13 | Game 8 | Missouri | 1–0 | Holy Cross | |
| June 14 | Game 9 | Western Michigan | 5–1 | Duke | Duke eliminated |
| June 14 | Game 10 | Holy Cross | 2–1 | Texas | Texas eliminated |
| June 14 | Game 11 | Missouri | 3–2 | Penn State | |
| June 15 | Game 12 | Holy Cross | 15–3 | Western Michigan | Western Michigan eliminated |
| June 15 | Game 13 | Holy Cross | 15–4 | Penn State | Penn State eliminated |
| June 16 | Game 14 | Holy Cross | 7–3 | Missouri | |
| June 17 | Final | Holy Cross | 8–4 | Missouri | Holy Cross wins CWS |
