= 1956 College Baseball All-America Team =

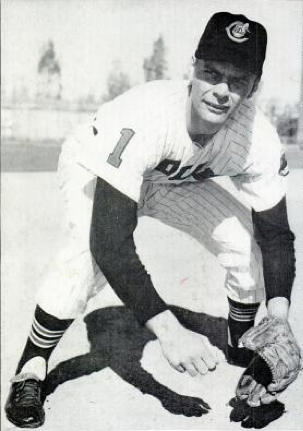
1956 All-Americans included former Arizona Wildcats baseball head coach Jerry Kindall.

This is a list of college baseball players named first team All-Americans for the 1956 NCAA baseball season. From 1947 to 1963, the American Baseball Coaches Association was the only generally recognized All-America selector, so any player selected by the ABCA is considered a "consensus" All-American.

== Key ==
A	American Baseball Coaches Association
	Member of the National College Baseball Hall of Fame
	Consensus All-American – selected the ABCA

== All-Americans ==
Position	Name	School	#	A	Other awards and honors
Pitcher	Don Lee	Arizona	1	✓	
Pitcher	Jerry Thomas	Minnesota	1	✓	College World Series Most Outstanding Player
Catcher	Elmer Kohorst	Notre Dame	1	✓	
First baseman	Kent Hadley	USC	1	✓	
Second baseman	Don Prohovich	Holy Cross	1	✓	
Shortstop	Jerry Kindall	Minnesota	1	✓	
Third baseman	John Brown	Nebraska	1	✓	
Outfielder	Don Napierkowski	Wyoming	1	✓	
Outfielder	John Ruso	Santa Clara	1	✓	
Outfielder	George Watts	Lafayette	1	✓	

== See also ==
- List of college baseball awards
