= 1953 College Baseball All-America Team =

This is a list of college baseball players named first team All-Americans for the 1953 NCAA baseball season. From 1947 to 1963, the American Baseball Coaches Association was the only generally recognized All-America selector, so any player selected by the ABCA is considered a "consensus" All-American.

== Key ==
A	American Baseball Coaches Association
	Member of the National College Baseball Hall of Fame
	Consensus All-American – selected the ABCA

== All-Americans ==
Position	Name	School	#	A
Pitcher	Paul Giel	Minnesota	1	✓
Pitcher	Warren Neuberger	CCNY	1	✓
Catcher	John Shepard	Stanford	1	✓
First baseman	Ed Simpson	USC	1	✓
Second baseman	Gene Sheets	Oklahoma	1	✓
Shortstop	Bruce Haynam	Michigan	1	✓
Third baseman	B. B. Hopkins	Tennessee	1	✓
Outfielder	Fred Fleming	Bowdoin	1	✓
Outfielder	Richard Murphy	Ohio	1	✓
Outfielder	Mickey Sullivan	Baylor	1	✓

== See also ==
- List of college baseball awards
