= Lovette Hill =

American football and baseball coach (1907–1989)

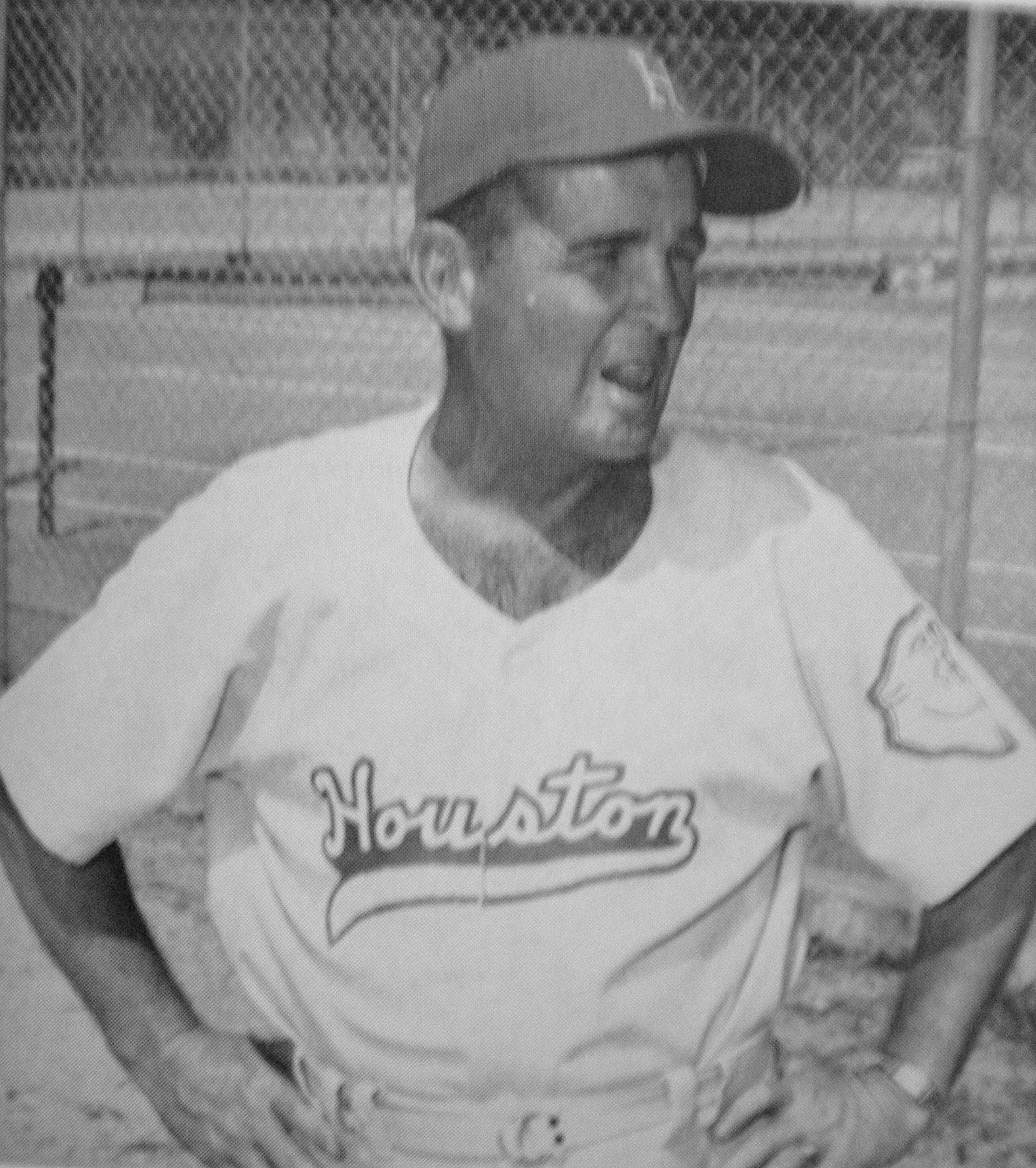
- Hill, c. 1958

Biographical details
- Born: March 23, 1907; Granger, Texas, U.S.
- Died: August 27, 1989 (aged 82); Houston, Texas, U.S.

Playing career

Football
- 1928–1931: Centenary
- Position: End

Coaching career (HC unless noted)

Baseball
- 1950–1974: Houston

Football
- 1949–1961: Houston (assistant)

Head coaching record
- Overall: 343–325–5 (.513)

Accomplishments and honors

Championships
- GCC regular season (1950); 3 MVC tournament (1951, 1953, 1960); 4 MVC regular season (1951–1953, 1960)

Lovette Lee Hill (March 23, 1907 – August 27, 1989) was an American football and baseball coach. He was the fourth head coach of the Houston Cougars baseball team from 1950 to 1974. Hill holds the record for the longest serving head baseball coach in University of Houston history. While at Houston, Hill compiled a 343–325–5 record with four first-place finishes in the Missouri Valley Conference. He guided the Cougars to their only two College World Series appearances, in 1953 and 1967. In 1967, his team was national runner-up.

From 1949 to 1961, Hill also served as an assistant coach for the Houston Cougars football team. He graduated in 1931 from Centenary College of Louisiana.

== Head coaching record ==
Record table
Season	Team	Overall	Conference	Standing	Postseason
Houston Cougars (Gulf Coast Conference) (1950)
1950	Houston	10–6	4–0	1st	
Houston Cougars (Missouri Valley Conference) (1951–1960)
1951	Houston	16–9	7–1	1st (West)	NCAA District Playoffs
1952	Houston	11–6	6–1	1st (South)	
1953	Houston	15–11	6–2	1st	College World Series
1954	Houston	12–10	4–5	3rd	
1955	Houston	6–13	3–5	5th	
1956	Houston	14–10	5–4	4th	
1957	Houston	6–11–1	4–3	3rd	
1958	Houston	11–13	6–3	1st (West)	NCAA District Playoffs
1959	Houston	7–14	5–4	1st (West)	
1960	Houston	12–11	6–1	1st (West)	NCAA District Playoffs
Houston Cougars (NCAA University Division Independent) (1961–1972)
1961	Houston	4–11			
1962	Houston	16–6			
1963	Houston	4–15			
1964	Houston	16–13			
1965	Houston	12–14			
1966	Houston	18–11–1			NCAA District Playoffs
1967	Houston	21–11			College World Series Runner-up
1968	Houston	14–15–1			
1969	Houston	15–23			
1970	Houston	19–17			
1971	Houston	24–15			
1972	Houston	25–23–1			
Houston Cougars (Southwest Conference) (1973–1974)
1973	Houston	15–16–1	9–11	5th	
1974	Houston	20–21	10–13	6th	
Houston:		343–325–5 (.513)	75–53 (.586)		
Total:		343–325–5 (.513)			
National champion Postseason invitational champion Conference regular season champion Conference regular season and conference tournament champion Division regular season champion Division regular season and conference tournament champion Conference tournament champion
