= John Temple (coach) =

American athletic coach

Biographical details
- Born: c. 1908
- Died: July 8, 1997 (aged 89); Arlington, Massachusetts, U.S.

Playing career
- 1929–1931: Boston College
- Position: Third basemen / Outfielder

Coaching career (HC unless noted)

Basketball
- 1941–1942: Rindge Tech (MA)

Ice hockey
- 1942–1943: Boston College
- 1945–1957: Boston College HS (MA)

Baseball
- 1950–1957: Boston College

Head coaching record
- Overall: 84–58–1 (baseball)

Accomplishments and honors

Awards
- Boston College Hall of Fame (1987)

John F. Temple was an American athletic coach who was the head coach of the Boston College Eagles men's ice hockey team from 1942 to 1943 and the Boston College Eagles baseball team from 1950 to 1957.

== Playing career ==
Temple played ice hockey and baseball at the Cambridge Latin School in Cambridge, Massachusetts. He played his freshman year at Boston College as a member of the hockey team, but the program was dropped before his sophomore season. He then played third base and outfield for the Boston College baseball team from 1929 to 1931. He then briefly played in the Northeastern League before retired to teach in the Cambridge school system. He was also an official for high school and college football, baseball, and hockey games

== Coaching career ==
In 1941, Temple was named boys' basketball coach at Rindge Tech in Cambridge. The following year, he succeeded John Kelley as coach of the Boston College hockey team after Kelley joined the United States Navy. He was named hockey coach at Boston College High School in 1945 and led the team to its first league title in 1951.

In 1950, Temple was named the successor to Boston College baseball coach Freddie Maguire, who left to take a scouting job with the Boston Red Sox. He coached the Eagles to the 1953 College World Series, where they went 2–2 and finished 4th.

== Personal life ==
Temple was born in Cambridge and resided there for 70 years. He died on July 8, 1997 at his home in Arlington, Massachusetts. He was 89 years old.

== Head coaching record ==
Record table
Season	Team	Overall	Conference	Standing	Postseason
Boston College Eagles (Independent) (1950–1957)
1950	Boston College	12–8			
1951	Boston College	12–8			
1952	Boston College	12–7			
1953	Boston College	13–7			1953 College World Series
1954	Boston College	9–6			
1955	Boston College	12–6			NCAA baseball tournament
1956	Boston College	9–6			
1957	Boston College	5–10–1			
Boston College:		84–58–1			
Total:		84–58–1			
National champion Postseason invitational champion Conference regular season champion Conference regular season and conference tournament champion Division regular season champion Division regular season and conference tournament champion Conference tournament champion
