= 1953 Houston Cougars baseball team =

American college baseball season

1953 Houston Cougars baseball
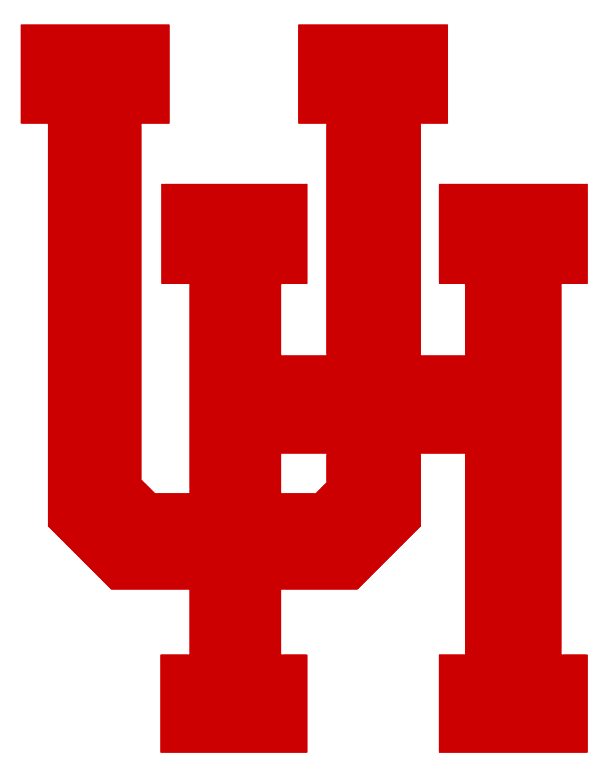

Missouri Valley Conference champions District 5 champions

College World Series, 0–2
- Conference: Missouri Valley Conference
- Record: 15–11 (6–2 Missouri Valley)
- Head coach: Lovette Hill (4th season)
- Home stadium: Cougar Field

1953 Missouri Valley Conference baseball standings
	Conf.				Overall
Team	W		L	PCT	W		L	PCT
Houston ‍†‍‍^{y}	6	–	2	.750	15	–	11	.577
Oklahoma A&M ‍‍‍	4	–	2	.667	13	–	4	.765
Tulsa ‍‍‍	4	–	2	.667	11	–	6	.647
Detroit ‍‍‍	2	–	1	.667	11	–	7	.611
Saint Louis ‍‍‍	1	–	2	.333		–		–
Wichita State ‍‍‍	0	–	6	.000		–		–
† – Conference champion y – Invited to the College World Series; As of June 30, 1951; Rankings from Coaches' Poll

The 1953 Houston Cougars baseball team represented the University of Houston during the 1953 NCAA baseball season. The team won the Missouri Valley Conference regular season championship, and advanced to participate in the College World Series. It was Houston's first appearance in the College World Series. The team was coached by fourth-year head coach Lovette Hill, and played its home games at Cougar Field.

Showing a sluggish start to the season, Houston lost six out of their first seven games, but then went on a seven-game winning streak that eventually propelled the team to a conference championship.

== Roster ==
1953 Houston Cougars baseball
Roster
Pitchers: 13 Ronnie Zeller; 18 Bobby Clatterbuck; 20 Ken Lile; 22 Bobby Vickers; Catchers: 8 Frankie Peters; 11 Claude Arrington	Infielders: 3 Doug Osburn; 4 Jackie Reed; 7 Carlton Hanta; 14 Billy Savarino	Outfielders: 8 Foy Boyd; 9 Gene Russell; 12 John Dean; 15 Allen Shipley	Head coach: Lovette Hill

== Schedule ==
1953 Houston Cougars baseball game log
Regular season
Regular Season

Date	Opponent	Score	Overall record	Missouri Valley Record
March 9	vs. Baylor	3–4	0–1	–
March 10	vs. Baylor	6–11	0–2	–
March 13	vs. Sam Houston State	2–4	0–3	–
March 18	vs. Lamar	12–2	1–3	–
March 23	vs. Texas A&M	3–5	1–4	–
March 25	vs. Minnesota	2–6	1–5	–
March 26	vs. Minnesota	4–5	1–6	–
April 2	vs. Louisiana	5–4	2–6	–
April 3	vs. Louisiana	13–6	3–6	–
April 4	vs. Louisiana	7–4	4–6	–
April 10	vs. Wichita State	10–3	5–6	1–0
April 10	vs. Wichita State	9–4	6–6	2–0
April 14	vs. Lamar	6–4	7–6	–
April 20	vs. Sam Houston State	10–7	8–6	–
May 1	vs. Tulsa	6–8	8–7	2–1
May 2	vs. Tulsa	18–14	9–7	3–1
May 8	vs. Oklahoma State	4–6	9–8	3–2
May 9	vs. Oklahoma State	3–2	10–8	4–2
May 12	vs. Texas A&M	3–2	11–8	–
May 22	vs. Detroit	6–3	12–8	5–2
May 22	vs. Detroit	10–2	13–8	6–2

Postseason
District 5 Tournament

Date	Opponent	Score	Overall record
May 26	vs. Oklahoma	4–7	13–9
May 27	vs. Oklahoma	8–7	14–9
May 27	vs. Oklahoma	5–3	15–9

College World Series

Date	Opponent	Site/stadium	Score	Overall record
June 11	vs. Boston College	Rosenblatt Stadium	1–4	15–10
June 12	vs. Stanford	Rosenblatt Stadium	6–7	15–11
