= 1953 Boston College Eagles baseball team =

American college baseball season

1953 Boston College Eagles baseball

Greater Boston League champions District I champions

College World Series, 4th
- Conference: Greater Boston League
- Record: 13–7 (6–1 GBL)
- Head coach: John Temple (4th season)
- Captain: Bill McMorrow
- Home stadium: Alumni Field

The 1953 Boston College Eagles baseball team represented Boston College in the 1953 NCAA baseball season. The Eagles played their home games at Alumni Field. The team was coached by John Temple in his 4th year at Boston College.

The Eagles won the District II Playoff to advanced to the College World Series, where they were defeated by the Lafayette Leopards.

The Eagles 11 wins entering the College World Series are a record for the fewest by a team entering the College World Series.

== Roster ==
1953 Boston College Eagles baseball team
Players
Coaches

#	Pos.	Name	B/T	Height	Weight	Year	Home town
1	OF	Bill McMorrow (C)	/	—	—	Sr
15	INF	John O'Rourke	/	—	—
17	P	Jim Scholz	/	—	—
19	INF	Al Tassanari	/	—	—
23	P	Ed DiLoranzo	/	—	—
25	INF	Bob Flanagan	/	—	—
26	C	Dick Murray	/	—	—
27	OF	Bob Baggett	/	—	—
28	C	Chet Hanewich	/	—	—
31	P	Dan Callanan	/	—	—
32	INF	Jack McGrath	/	—	—
33	INF	Dick Scanlon	/	—	—
34	INF	John Ruggiero	/	—	—
35	C	George Ciovacco	/	—	—
36	P	Paul Lockary	/	—	—
37	INF	Jim Cisternelli	/	—	—
38	INF	Bob Manning	/	—	—
39	OF	Richie Doyle	/	—	—
41	INF	Frank Tanner	/	—	—
42	P	Jim Clasby	/	—	—
43	P	Jack McKinnon	/	—	—
48	P	Tony Daukas	/	—	—

Head coach

John Temple

Assistant coach(es)

Legend

- (C) Team captain
- (S) Suspended
- (I) Ineligible
- Injured
- Current redshirt

Roster
Last update: December 3, 2020

== Schedule ==
1953 Boston College Eagles baseball game log
Regular season
April (4–1)

#	Date	Opponent	Site/stadium	Score	Overall record	GBL record
1	April 11	at Rhode Island	Unknown • Kingston, Rhode Island	3–1	1–0	–
2	April 16	Brandeis	Alumni Field • Boston, Massachusetts	8–2	2–0	1–0
3	April 18	Boston University	Alumni Field • Boston, Massachusetts	4–2	3–0	2–0
4	April 22	Rhode Island	Alumni Field • Boston, Massachusetts	4–8	3–1	2–0
5	April 25	Providence	Alumni Field • Boston, Massachusetts	7–4	4–1	2–0

May (4–1)

#	Date	Opponent	Site/stadium	Score	Overall record	GBL record
6	May 6	Massachusetts	Alumni Field • Boston, Massachusetts	1–5	4–2	2–1
7	May 11	MIT	Alumni Field • Boston, Massachusetts	7–6	5–2	3–1
8	May 25	Northeastern	Alumni Field • Boston, Massachusetts	5–4	6–2	4–1
9	May 28	at Northeastern	Parsons Field • Brookline, Massachusetts	12–4	7–2	5–1
10	May 30	at Holy Cross	Fitton Field • Worcester, Massachusetts	9–2	8–2	5–1

Postseason
District I Playoff (2–0)

#	Date	Opponent	Site/stadium	Score	Overall record	GBL record
11	June 1	vs Trinity	Fitton Field • Worcester, Massachusetts	10–6	9–2	5–1
12	June 2	vs Springfield	Fitton Field • Worcester, Massachusetts	9–2	10–2	5–1

June (1–3)

#	Date	Opponent	Site/stadium	Score	Overall record	GBL record
13	June 3	at Harvard	Joseph J. O'Donnell Field • Boston, Massachusetts	9–4	10–3	5–1
14	June 6	at Tufts	Unknown • Medford, Massachusetts	11–4	11–3	6–1
15	June 8	Holy Cross	Alumni Field • Boston, Massachusetts	1–8	11–4	6–1
16	June 9	at Holy Cross	Fitton Field • Worcester, Massachusetts	6–20	11–5	6–1

College World Series (2–2)

#	pri	Opponent	Site/stadium	Score	Overall record	GBL record
17	June 11	vs Houston	Omaha Municipal Stadium • Omaha, Nebraska	4–1	12–5	6–1
18	June 12	vs Michigan	Omaha Municipal Stadium • Omaha, Nebraska	2–6	12–6	6–1
19	June 13	vs Duke	Omaha Municipal Stadium • Omaha, Nebraska	7–6	13–6	6–1
20	June 14	vs Lafayette	Omaha Municipal Stadium • Omaha, Nebraska	1–2	13–7	6–1
