= 1956 New Hampshire Wildcats baseball team =

American college baseball season

1956 New Hampshire Wildcats baseball

Yankee champion District I champion

College World Series, T-5th
- Conference: Yankee Conference
- Record: 13–7 (7–1 Yankee)
- Head coach: Hank Swasey (11th season)
- Captain: Fred Dauten
- Home stadium: Brackett Field

1956 Yankee Conference baseball standings
	Conf.						Overall
Team	W		L		T	PCT	W		L		T	PCT
New Hampshire ‍†‍‍^{y}	7	–	1	–	0	.875	13	–	7	–	0	.650
UMass ‍‍‍^{y}	7	–	1	–	1	.833	10	–	6	–	1	.618
Vermont ‍‍‍^{y}	1	–	3	–	0	.250	18	–	6	–	0	.750
Connecticut ‍‍‍	4	–	4	–	1	.500	9	–	8	–	2	.526
Rhode Island ‍‍‍	1	–	5	–	0	.167	10	–	7	–	0	.588
Maine ‍‍‍	0	–	6	–	0	.000	7	–	11	–	1	.395
† – Conference champion y – Invited to the NCAA Tournament; As of June 30, 1956

The 1956 New Hampshire Wildcats baseball team represented the University of New Hampshire in the 1956 NCAA baseball season. The Wildcats played their home games at Brackett Field. The team was coached by Hank Swasey in his 11th year as head coach at New Hampshire.

The Wildcats won the District I playoffs to advance to the College World Series, where they were defeated by the Arizona Wildcats.

== Roster ==
1956 New Hampshire Wildcats baseball team
Players
Coaches

#	Pos.	Name	B/T	Height	Weight	Year	Home town
	RHP	Herb Adams	/R	—	—	So
	OF	Charlie Blossom	/	—	—
	INF	Charlie Carmahalis	/	—	—
	OF	Dona Cauchon	/	—	—
	INF	Pete Ledger	/	—	—
	OF	Fred Dauten (C)	/	—	—
	INF	John DeWitt	/	—	—
	LHP	Joe Kazura	/L	—	—
	INF	Jerry Kenneally	/	—	—
	INF	Hugh Marshall	/	—	—
	INF	Frank McLaughlin	/	—	—
	OF	Frank O'Connor	/	—	—
	OF	George Tansey	/	—	—
	OF	Ted Wright	/	—	—
	C	Bob Yetman	/	—	—	So
			/	—	—

Head coach

Hank Swasey

Assistant coach(es)

Legend

- (C) Team captain
- (S) Suspended
- (I) Ineligible
- Injured
- Current redshirt

== Schedule ==
1956 New Hampshire Wildcats baseball game log
Regular season
April (1–1)

#	Date	Opponent	Site/stadium	Score	Overall record	Yankee Record
1	April 25	at Bowdoin	Unknown • Brunswick, Maine	1–5	0–1	–
2	April 27	Rhode Island	Brackett Field • Durham, New Hampshire	6–1	1–1	1–0

May (9–4)

#	Date	Opponent	Site/stadium	Score	Overall record	Yankee Record
3	May 1	Maine	Unknown • Orono, Maine	3–2	2–1	2–0
4	May 4	Springfield	Brackett Field • Durham, New Hampshire	8–1	3–1	2–0
5	May 5	Lowell Tech	Brackett Field • Durham, New Hampshire	11–5	4–1	2–0
6	May 7	Boston University	Brackett Field • Durham, New Hampshire	2–8	4–2	2–0
7	May 11	UMass	Brackett Field • Durham, New Hampshire	0–2	4–3	2–1
8	May 11	UMass	Brackett Field • Durham, New Hampshire	5–3	5–3	3–1
9	May 12	Connecticut	Brackett Field • Durham, New Hampshire	7–3	6–3	4–1
10	May 12	Connecticut	Brackett Field • Durham, New Hampshire	6–5	7–3	5–1
11	May	Northeastern	Brackett Field • Durham, New Hampshire	3–10	7–4	5–1
12	May 18	Rhode Island	Unknown • Kingston, Rhode Island	4–0	8–4	6–1
13	May 19	Amherst	Unknown • Amherst, Massachusetts	9–11	8–5	6–1
14	May 23	at Dartmouth	Brackett Field • Durham, New Hampshire	12–6	9–5	6–1
15	May 26	Maine	Brackett Field • Durham, New Hampshire	–	10–5	7–1

Postseason
NCAA District I Playoff (2–0)

#	Date	Opponent	Site/stadium	Score	Overall record	Yankee Record
16	June 3	vs Boston University	Pynchon Park • Springfield, Massachusetts	5–0	11–5	7–1
17	June 3	vs Vermont	Pynchon Park • Springfield, Massachusetts	2–0	12–5	7–1

College World Series (1–2)

#	Date	Opponent	Site/stadium	Score	Overall record	Yankee Record
18	June 9	vs Ole Miss	Omaha Municipal Stadium • Omaha, Nebraska	12–13	12–6	7–1
19	June 10	vs Washington State	Omaha Municipal Stadium • Omaha, Nebraska	6–3	13–6	7–1
20	June 11	vs Arizona	Omaha Municipal Stadium • Omaha, Nebraska	1–0	13–7	7–1
