= 1956 NCAA baseball tournament =

American college sports championship

- Season: 1956
- Teams: 24
- Finals site: Johnny Rosenblatt Stadium; Omaha, NE
- Champions: Minnesota (1st title)
- Runner-up: Arizona (3rd CWS Appearance)
- Winning coach: Dick Siebert (1st title)
- MOP: Jerry Thomas (Minnesota)

The 1956 NCAA baseball tournament was played at the end of the 1956 NCAA baseball season to determine the national champion of college baseball. The tournament concluded with eight teams competing in the College World Series, a double-elimination tournament in its tenth year. Eight regional districts sent representatives to the College World Series with preliminary rounds within each district serving to determine each representative. These events would later become known as regionals. Each district had its own format for selecting teams, resulting in 24 teams participating in the tournament at the conclusion of their regular season, and in some cases, after a conference tournament. The College World Series was held in Omaha, NE from June 9 to June 14. The tenth tournament's champion was Minnesota, coached by Dick Siebert, and the Most Outstanding Player was Jerry Thomas of Minnesota.

== Tournament ==
=== District 1 ===
Games played at Springfield, Massachusetts.

Semifinals
Vermont	8
Massachusetts	1
New Hampshire	5
Boston University	0

Finals
New Hampshire	2
Vermont	0

=== District 2 ===
Games played at Allentown, Pennsylvania.

Semifinals
St. John's	3
Delaware	1
NYU	15
Penn State	7

Finals
St. John's	2
NYU	6

=== District 3 ===
Games played at Gastonia, North Carolina.

Semifinals
Duke	1	7	4
Florida State	2	6	2
Ole Miss	4	3	—
Tennessee Tech	3	2	—

Finals
Duke	4	2	1
Ole Miss	2	6	7

=== District 4 ===
Games played at Athens, Ohio (Ohio vs. Cincinnati and Ohio vs. Minnesota) and Minneapolis, Minnesota (Minnesota vs. Notre Dame).

Semifinals
Ohio	8
Cincinnati	6
Minnesota	3	15	10
Notre Dame	4	5	1

Finals
Ohio	0	6	—
Minnesota	5	7	—

=== District 5 ===
Games played in Stillwater, OK.

Semifinal		Final
		Bradley	11
Oklahoma	3	North Dakota Agricultural College	2
North Dakota Agricultural College	8

=== District 6 ===
Games played at Tucson, Arizona.

Finals
Arizona	7	8	—
TCU	5	2	—

=== District 7 ===
Games played at Greeley, Colorado.

Finals
Wyoming	8	3	9
Colorado State College	5	8	7

=== District 8 ===
- Washington State (Automatic College World Series qualifier)

== College World Series ==
=== Participants ===
School	Conference	Record (conference)	Head coach	CWS appearances	CWS best finish	CWS record
Arizona	Border	45–6 (4–0)	Frank Sancet	2 (last: 1955)	4th (1954)	3–4
Bradley	MVC	22–6 (7–2)	Leo Schrall	1 (last: 1950)	8th (1950)	0–2
Minnesota	Big 10	28–8 (11–2)	Dick Siebert	0 (last: none)	none	0–0
New Hampshire	Yankee	12–5 (7–1)	Hank Swasey	0 (last: none)	none	0–0
NYU	MNYC	16–4–1 (n/a)	Bill McCarthy	0 (last: none)	none	0–0
Ole Miss	SEC	22–8 (13–3)	Tom Swayze	0 (last: none)	none	0–0
Washington State	PCC	28–6 (11–4)	Buck Bailey	1 (last: 1950)	2nd (1950)	3–2
Wyoming	Skyline	17–13 (7–2)	Bud Daniel	0 (last: none)	none	0–0

=== Results ===
==== Bracket ====
Upper round 1
Arizona	3
NYU	0
Minnesota	4
Wyoming	0
Ole Miss	13
New Hampshire	2
Bradley	4
Washington State	3

Upper round 2
Arizona	2
Minnesota	3
Ole Miss	4
Bradley	0
Lower round 1
NYU	2
Wyoming	8
New Hampshire	6
Washington State	3

Upper final
Minnesota	13
Ole Miss	5
Lower round 2
Bradley	12
Wyoming	8
Arizona	1
New Hampshire	0

Semifinals
Minnesota	8
Bradley	3
Ole Miss	3
Arizona	7

Final
Minnesota	4	12
Arizona	10	1

==== Game results ====
Date	Game	Winner	Score	Loser	Notes
June 9	Game 1	Arizona	3–0	NYU	
June 9	Game 2	Minnesota	4–0	Wyoming	
June 9	Game 3	Ole Miss	13–2	New Hampshire	
June 9	Game 4	Bradley	4–3	Washington State	
June 10	Game 5	Wyoming	8–2	NYU	New York eliminated
June 10	Game 6	New Hampshire	6–3	Washington State	Washington State eliminated
June 10	Game 7	Minnesota	3–1	Arizona	
June 10	Game 8	Ole Miss	4–0	Bradley	
June 11	Game 9	Bradley	12–8	Wyoming	Wyoming eliminated
June 11	Game 10	Arizona	1–0	New Hampshire	New Hampshire eliminated
June 11	Game 11	Minnesota	13–5	Ole Miss	
June 12	Game 12	Arizona	7–3	Ole Miss	Ole Miss eliminated
June 12	Game 13	Minnesota	8–3	Bradley	Bradley eliminated
June 13	Game 14	Arizona	10–4	Minnesota	
June 14	Final	Minnesota	12–1	Arizona	Minnesota wins CWS

=== Notable players ===
- Arizona: Don Lee, Carl Thomas
- Bradley:
- Minnesota: Jerry Kindall
- New Hampshire:
- NYU:
- Ole Miss: Joe Gibbon
- Washington State:
- Wyoming:
