= 1956 NYU Violets baseball team =

American college baseball season

1956 NYU Violets baseball

District II Playoff

College World Series, T-7th
- Conference: Metropolitan New York Conference
- Record: 16–6–1 ( Metro)
- Head coach: Bill McCarthy (35th season)
- Home stadium: Ohio Field

The 1956 NYU Violets baseball team represented New York University in the 1956 NCAA baseball season. The Violets played their home games at Ohio Field. The team was coached by Bill McCarthy in his 35th year as head coach at NYU.

The Violots won the District II playoff to advance to the College World Series, where they were defeated by the Wyoming Cowboys.

== Roster ==
1956 NYU Violets baseball team
Players	Coaches
# / Pos. / Name / B/T / Height / Weight / Year / Home town; / / / / / — / —	Head coach Bill McCarthy Assistant coach(es) Legend: (C) Team captain; (S) Suspended; (I) Ineligible; Injured; Current redshirt; Roster; Last update: September 10, 2021

== Schedule ==
1956 NYU Violets baseball game log
Regular season
March (–)

#	Date	Opponent	Site/stadium	Score	Overall record	Metro Record

April (–)

#	Date	Opponent	Site/stadium	Score	Overall record	Metro Record
	April 17	at St. John's	Alley Pond Park • New York, New York	4–5	–	–

May (–)

#	Date	Opponent	Site/stadium	Score	Overall record	Metro Record
	May 15	St. John's	Ohio Field • New York, New York	2–1	–	–

Postseason
NCAA District II Playoff (2–0)

#	Date	Opponent	Site/stadium	Score	Overall record	Metro Record
20	June 1	vs Penn State	Bicentennial Park • Allentown, Pennsylvania	15–7	15–4–1	–
21	June 2	vs St. John's	Bicentennial Park • Allentown, Pennsylvania	6–2	16–4–1	–

College World Series (0–2)

#	Date	Opponent	Site/stadium	Score	Overall record	Metro Record
22	June 9	vs Arizona	Johnny Rosenblatt Stadium • Omaha, Nebraska	0–3	16–5–1	–
23	June 10	vs Wyoming	Johnny Rosenblatt Stadium • Omaha, Nebraska	2–8	16–6–1	–
