= 1956 Ole Miss Rebels baseball team =

American college baseball season

1956 Ole Miss Rebels baseball

District III champion

College World Series, T-5th
- Conference: Southeastern Conference
- Record: 24–10 (13–3 SEC)
- Head coach: Tom Swayze (6th season)
- Home stadium: Swayze Field

1956 Southeastern Conference baseball standings
	Conf.				Overall
Team	W		L	PCT	W		L	PCT
Florida ‍†‍‍^{y}	13	–	3	.813	20	–	4	.833
Ole Miss ‍‍‍^{y}	13	–	3	.813	24	–	10	.706
Alabama ‍‍‍	15	–	5	.750	18	–	7	.720
Georgia ‍‍‍	10	–	5	.667	16	–	7	.696
Auburn ‍‍‍	9	–	7	.563	12	–	11	.522
Tennessee ‍‍‍	7	–	8	.467	10	–	13	.435
LSU ‍‍‍	7	–	9	.438	9	–	11	.450
Tulane ‍‍‍	7	–	9	.438	11	–	11	.500
Mississippi State ‍‍‍	6	–	9	.400	11	–	9	.550
Georgia Tech ‍‍‍	4	–	9	.308	11	–	12	.478
Vanderbilt ‍‍‍	3	–	12	.200	6	–	15	.286
Kentucky ‍‍‍	1	–	12	.077	4	–	18	.182
† – Conference champion y – Invited to the College World Series; As of June 18, 1956; Rankings from Coaches' Poll

The 1956 Ole Miss Rebels baseball team represented the University of Mississippi in the 1956 NCAA baseball season. The Rebels played their home games at Swayze Field. The team was coached by Tom Swayze in his 6th year as head coach at Ole Miss.

The Rebels won the District III to advance to the College World Series, where they were defeated by the Arizona Wildcats.

== Roster ==
1956 Ole Miss Rebels baseball team
Players
Coaches

#	Pos.	Name	B/T	Height	Weight	Year	Home town
		Charlie Baggett	/	—	—
15	INF	Raymond Brown	/	—	—
	LHP	Cecil Burford	/L	—	—
	C	Jerry Bynum	/	—	—
	C	Buddy Chain	/	—	—
	OF	Ed Crawford	/	—	—
	INF	Eagle Day	/	—	—
	P	Delbert Farmer	/	—	—
	OF	John Gainey	/	—	—
	INF	Buddy Garrison	/	—	—
		Joe Gibbon	/	—	—
	P	Don Goad	/	—	—	Sr
	INF	Billy Johnson	/	—	—
	OF	Billy Kinard	/	—	—
		Joe Pegram	/	—	—
	INF	Leroy Reed	/	—	—
	INF	Bernie Schreiber	/	—	—	Sr
17	INF	Bill Scott	/	—	—
	P	Dick Shelton	/	—	—
	P	Archie White	/	—	—	Sr
	OF	Don Williams	/	—	—
	RHP	Buddy Wittichen	/R	—	—	Jr

Head coach

Tom Swayze

Assistant coach(es)

Legend

- (C) Team captain
- (S) Suspended
- (I) Ineligible
- Injured
- Current redshirt

== Schedule ==
1956 Ole Miss Rebels baseball game log
Regular season
March (5–2)

#	Date	Opponent	Site/stadium	Score	Overall record	SEC record
1	March	Delta State	Swayze Field • Oxford, Mississippi	9–6	1–0	–
2	March	Delta State	Swayze Field • Oxford, Mississippi	21–1	2–0	–
3	March	Illinois Wesleyan	Swayze Field • Oxford, Mississippi	4–1	3–0	–
4	March	Illinois Wesleyan	Swayze Field • Oxford, Mississippi	10–12	3–1	–
5	March 30	LSU	Swayze Field • Oxford, Mississippi	1–2	3–2	0–1
6	March 31	LSU	Swayze Field • Oxford, Mississippi	8–6	4–2	1–1
7	March 31	LSU	Swayze Field • Oxford, Mississippi	11–0	5–2	2–1

Postseason
April (8–3)

#	Date	Opponent	Site/stadium	Score	Overall record	SEC record
8	April	at Arkansas State	Unknown • Jonesboro, Arkansas	7–0	6–2	2–1
9	April 6	at Alabama	Sewell–Thomas Stadium • Tuscaloosa, Alabama	7–15	6–3	2–2
10	April 7	at Alabama	Sewell–Thomas Stadium • Tuscaloosa, Alabama	11–2	7–3	3–2
11	April 7	at Alabama	Sewell–Thomas Stadium • Tuscaloosa, Alabama	13–14	7–4	3–3
12	April	Mississippi State	Swayze Field • Oxford, Mississippi	9–3	8–4	4–3
13	April	Mississippi State	Swayze Field • Oxford, Mississippi	14–2	9–4	5–3
14	April	at Loyola	Unknown • New Orleans, Louisiana	6–11	9–5	5–3
15	April	at Loyola	Unknown • New Orleans, Louisiana	5–4	10–5	5–3
16	April	at Tulane	Tulane Diamond • New Orleans, Louisiana	10–17	11–5	6–3
17	April	at Tulane	Tulane Diamond • New Orleans, Louisiana	7–1	12–5	7–3
18	April	at Tulane	Tulane Diamond • New Orleans, Louisiana	1–0	13–5	8–3

May (5–0)

#	Date	Opponent	Site/stadium	Score	Overall record	SEC record
19	May	Vanderbilt	Swayze Field • Oxford, Mississippi	9–3	14–5	9–3
20	May	Vanderbilt	Swayze Field • Oxford, Mississippi	7–0	15–5	10–3
21	May	Vanderbilt	Swayze Field • Oxford, Mississippi	3–0	16–5	11–3
22	May	at Mississippi State	Unknown • Starkville, Mississippi	6–2	17–5	12–3
23	May	at Mississippi State	Unknown • Starkville, Mississippi	8–5	18–5	13–3

Postseason
SEC Conference Championship (0–2)

#	Date	Opponent	Site/stadium	Score	Overall record	SEC record
24	May	at Florida	Perry Field • Gainesville, Florida	3–8	18–6	13–3
25	May	Florida	Sawyze Field • Oxford, Mississippi	1–5	18–7	13–3

NCAA District III Playoff (4–1)

#	Date	Opponent	Site/stadium	Score	Overall record	SEC record
26	June 1	vs Tennessee Tech	Sims Legion Park • Gastonia, North Carolina	4–3	19–7	13–3
27	June 2	vs Tennessee Tech	Sims Legion Park • Gastonia, North Carolina	3–2	20–7	13–3
28	June 4	vs Duke	Sims Legion Park • Gastonia, North Carolina	2–4	20–8	13–3
29	June 4	vs Duke	Sims Legion Park • Gastonia, North Carolina	6–2	21–8	13–3
30	June 4	vs Duke	Sims Legion Park • Gastonia, North Carolina	7–1	22–8	13–3

College World Series (2–2)

#	Date	Opponent	Site/stadium	Score	Overall record	SEC record
31	June 9	vs New Hampshire	Omaha Municipal Stadium • Omaha, Nebraska	13–12	23–8	13–3
32	June 10	vs Bradley	Omaha Municipal Stadium • Omaha, Nebraska	4–0	24–8	13–3
33	June 11	vs Minnesota	Omaha Municipal Stadium • Omaha, Nebraska	5–13	24–9	13–3
34	June 12	vs Arizona	Omaha Municipal Stadium • Omaha, Nebraska	5–13	24–10	13–3

== Awards and honors ==
Ed Crawford

- All-SEC

Eagle Day

- All-SEC

Joe Gibbon

- All-SEC

Billy Kinard

- All-SEC

Bernie Schreiber

- All-SEC
- All-District III Tournament Team
- First Team All-America American Baseball Coaches Association
