= 1953 Texas Longhorns baseball team =

American college baseball season

1953 Texas Longhorns baseball

SWC Champions

College World Series, runner-up
- Conference: Southwest Conference
- Record: 24–7–1 (12–3–1 SWC)
- Head coach: Bibb Falk (11th year)
- Home stadium: Clark Field

1953 Southwest Conference baseball standings
	Conf.				Overall
Team	W		L	PCT	W		L	PCT
Texas ‍†‍‍^{y}	12	–	3	.800	25	–	7	.781
SMU ‍†‍‍	12	–	3	.800	15	–	6	.714
Baylor ‍‍‍	7	–	5	.583	7	–	5	.583
Texas A&M ‍‍‍	6	–	9	.400	10	–	15	.400
Rice ‍‍‍	3	–	11	.214	7	–	16	.304
TCU ‍‍‍	2	–	11	.154	7	–	15	.318
† – Conference champion y – Invited to the College World Series; As of June 30, 1953; Rankings from Collegiate Baseball

The 1953 Texas Longhorns baseball team represented the University of Texas at Austin in the 1953 NCAA baseball season. The Longhorns played their home games at Clark Field. The team was coached by Bibb Falk in his 11th season at Texas.

The Longhorns reached the College World Series final, but were eliminated by Michigan.

== Personnel ==
=== Roster ===
1953 Texas Longhorns roster
Pitchers: Boyd Linker; J. L. Smith; John R. Jones; Catchers: Randy Biesenbach; Ronald Spradlin	Infielders: Paul Mohr; Outfielders: Travis Eckert; Tommy Snow	Unknown: Roy Kelly; Walter Oden; Jimmy Pace; Jesse Smith; Buddy Stevenson; Robert Towery; Martin Wiginton; Thomas Yium

=== Coaches ===
1953 Texas Longhorns baseball coaching staff
- Bibb Falk – Head coach – 11th year
- Dan Watson – Assistant coach (freshmen) – 1st year

== Schedule ==
1953 Texas Longhorns baseball game log
Regular season
March

Date	Opponent	Site/stadium	Score	Overall record	SWC record
March 17	at Baylor (Houston)	Houston, TX	W 10–5	1–0	
March 21	Baylor (Houston)	Houston, TX	W 25–7	2–0	
March 23	Minnesota	Clark Field • Austin, TX	W 8–6	3–0	
March 24	Minnesota	Clark Field • Austin, TX	W 7–6	4–0	
March 26	Texas A&M	Clark Field • Austin, TX	W 9–0	5–0	1–0
March 31	at Rice	Houston, TX	T 2–2^{15}	5–0–1	1–0–1

April

Date	Opponent	Site/stadium	Score	Overall record	SWC record
April 2	Sam Houston Teachers College	Clark Field • Austin, TX	W 6–5	6–0–1	
April 7	Oklahoma	Clark Field • Austin, TX	L 1–3	6–1–1	
April 8	Oklahoma	Clark Field • Austin, TX	W 18–8	7–1–1	
April 10	at Baylor	Waco, TX	W 6–5	8–1–1	2–0–1
April 11	at Baylor	Waco, TX	L 9–10	8–2–1	2–1–1
April 17	SMU	Clark Field • Austin, TX	L 3–12	8–3–1	2–2–1
April 18	SMU	Clark Field • Austin, TX	W 10–9^{12}	9–3–1	3–2–1
April 21	TCU	Clark Field • Austin, TX	W 12–5	10–3–1	4–2–1
April 25	Baylor	Clark Field • Austin, TX	W 14–11	11–3–1	5–2–1

May

Date	Opponent	Site/stadium	Score	Overall record	SWC record
May 1	at TCU	Fort Worth, TX	W 12–5	12–3–1	6–2–1
May 2	at TCU	Fort Worth, TX	W 7–4	13–3–1	7–2–1
May 4	at SMU	Dallas, TX	W 8–5	14–3–1	8–2–1
May 7	Rice	Clark Field • Austin, TX	W 7–2	15–3–1	9–2–1
May 7	Rice	Clark Field • Austin, TX	W 12–2	16–3–1	10–2–1
May 8	Rice	Clark Field • Austin, TX	L 2–4	16–4–1	10–3–1
May 18	at Texas A&M	Kyle Baseball Field • College Station, TX	W 1–0	17–4–1	11–3–1
May 18	at Texas A&M	Kyle Baseball Field • College Station, TX	W 4–1	18–4–1	12–3–1
May 29	at Seguin White Sox	Seguin, TX	W 6–3	exh.	

Postseason
District 6 Playoffs

Date	Opponent	Site/stadium	Score	Overall record	NCAAT Record
June 3	at Arizona	Tucson, AZ	W 7–6	19–4–1	1–0
June 4	at Arizona	Tucson, AZ	L 3–4	19–5–1	1–1
June 5	at Arizona	Tucson, AZ	W 5–3	20–5–1	2–1

College World Series

Date	Opponent	Site/stadium	Score	Overall record	CWS Record
June 11	Duke	Johnny Rosenblatt Stadium • Omaha, NE	W 2–1	21–5–1	1–0
June 12	Lafayette	Johnny Rosenblatt Stadium • Omaha, NE	W 5–3	22–5–1	2–0
June 13	Michigan	Johnny Rosenblatt Stadium • Omaha, NE	L 5–12	22–6–1	2–1
June 14	Michigan	Johnny Rosenblatt Stadium • Omaha, NE	W 6–4	23–6–1	3–1
June 15	Lafayette	Johnny Rosenblatt Stadium • Omaha, NE	W 13–3	24–6–1	4–1
June 16	Michigan	Johnny Rosenblatt Stadium • Omaha, NE	L 5–7	24–7–1	4–2
