= 1956 Minnesota Golden Gophers baseball team =

American college baseball season

1956 Minnesota Golden Gophers baseball

National champions Big Ten Conference champions
- Conference: Big Ten Conference
- Record: 33–9 (11–2 Big Ten)
- Head coach: Dick Siebert (9th year)
- Home stadium: Delta Field

1956 Big Ten Conference baseball standings
	Conf.						Overall
Team	W		L		T	PCT	W		L		T	PCT
Minnesota ‍†‍‍^{y}	11	–	2	–	0	.846	33	–	9	–	0	.786
Ohio State ‍‍‍	9	–	3	–	0	.750	18	–	7	–	0	.720
Wisconsin ‍‍‍	8	–	4	–	0	.667	20	–	7	–	0	.741
Michigan ‍‍‍	6	–	5	–	0	.545	17	–	9	–	0	.654
Northwestern ‍‍‍	6	–	7	–	0	.462	10	–	8	–	0	.556
Indiana ‍‍‍	5	–	6	–	0	.455	13	–	15	–	0	.464
Iowa ‍‍‍	5	–	8	–	0	.385	11	–	16	–	0	.407
Michigan State ‍‍‍	4	–	7	–	0	.364	16	–	13	–	0	.552
Purdue ‍‍‍	5	–	10	–	0	.333	14	–	14	–	0	.500
Illinois ‍‍‍	4	–	11	–	0	.267	15	–	18	–	1	.456
† – Conference champion y – Invited to the NCAA tournament

The 1956 Minnesota Golden Gophers baseball team represented the University of Minnesota in the 1956 NCAA baseball season. The Golden Gophers played their home games at Delta Field. The team was coached by Dick Siebert in his 9th season at Minnesota.

The Golden Gophers won the College World Series, defeating the Arizona Wildcats in the championship game.

== Roster ==
1956 Minnesota Golden Gophers roster
Pitchers: Ken Anderson; Don Craven; Jack Hoppe; Dean Maas; Rod Olstad; Jerry Thomas	Infielders: Doug Gillen; Jerry Kindall; Gene Martin; Jack McCartan	Outfielders: Bob Anderson; Shorty Cochran; Bill Horning; Dave Lindblom; Jim McNeely; Catchers: Woody Erickson; Rod Magnuson

== Schedule ==
Regular season
Date	Opponent	Score	Overall record	Big Ten record
March 19	at Texas	12–5	1–0	–
March 20	at Texas	4–2	2–0	–
March 21	at Rice	3–4	2–1	–
March 22	at Rice	12–19	2–2	–
March 23	at Houston	5–2	3–2	–
March 24	at Houston	4–6	3–3	–
March 26	at Oklahoma	3–10	3–4	–
March 27	at Oklahoma	5–8	3–5	–
April 7	at Luther	3–1	4–5	–
April 7	at Luther	14–5	5–5	–
April 13	at Iowa State	8–5	6–5	–
April 14	at Iowa State	9–2	7–5	–
April 14	at Iowa State	12–1	8–5	–
April 20	Northern Iowa	7–1	9–5	–
April 21	Northern Iowa	6–0	10–5	–
April 21	Northern Iowa	11–1	11–5	–
April 27	Wisconsin	4–6	11–6	0–1
April 28	Northwestern	7–0	12–6	1–1
April 28	Northwestern	3–1	13–6	2–1
May 4	at Illinois	3–2	14–6	3–1
May 5	at Purdue	3–2	15–6	4–1
May 5	at Purdue	3–2	16–6	5–1
May 11	Iowa	7–0	17–6	6–1
May 12	Iowa	17–7	18–6	7–1
May 12	Iowa	18–8	19–6	8–1
May 15	Augsburg	30–1	20–6	–
May 18	Michigan State	7–3	21–6	9–1
May 19	Michigan	7–6	22–6	10–1
May 19	Michigan	6–5	23–6	11–1
May 22	at St. John's	9–4	24–6	–
May 25	at Ohio State	2–4	24–7	11–2

1956 NCAA Division I baseball tournament
Date	Opponent	Location	Score	Overall record
May 29	vs. Notre Dame		3–4	24–8
May 30	vs. Notre Dame		15–5	25–8
May 30	vs. Notre Dame		10–1	26–8
June 1	vs. Ohio		5–0	27–8
June 2	vs. Ohio		7–6	28–8
June 9	vs. Wyoming	Rosenblatt Stadium	4–0	29–8
June 10	vs. Arizona	Rosenblatt Stadium	3–1	30–8
June 11	vs. Mississippi	Rosenblatt Stadium	13–5	31–8
June 12	vs. Bradley	Rosenblatt Stadium	8–3	32–8
June 13	vs. Arizona	Rosenblatt Stadium	4–10	32–9
June 14	vs. Arizona	Rosenblatt Stadium	12–1	33–9

== Awards and honors ==
Jerry Kindall
All-America First Team
All-Big Ten First Team
Jack McCartan
All-Big Ten First Team
Jerry Thomas
All-American First Team
All-Big Ten First Team
College World Series Most Outstanding Player
