= 1953 Southern Conference baseball tournament =

- Teams: 4
- Format: Double-elimination tournament
- Finals site: Raleigh, North Carolina
- Champions: Duke (3rd title)
- Winning coach: Ace Parker (1st title)

1953 Southern Conference baseball standings
| | Conf. | | | | Overall |
| Team | W | | L | PCT | W | | L | PCT |
|---|---|---|---|---|---|---|---|---|
Northern
| George Washington ^{x}‍‍‍ | 8 | – | 2 | .800 | | – | | – |
| Maryland ‍‍‍ | 8 | – | 2 | .800 | 16 | – | 7 | .696 |
| Richmond ‍‍‍ | 5 | – | 5 | .500 | 9 | – | 9 | .500 |
| Virginia Tech ‍‍‍ | 4 | – | 5 | .444 | 6 | – | 7 | .462 |
| VMI ‍‍‍ | 4 | – | 5 | .444 | | – | | – |
| Washington and Lee ‍‍‍ | 3 | – | 6 | .333 | | – | | – |
| West Virginia ‍‍‍ | 2 | – | 5 | .286 | | – | | – |
| William & Mary ‍‍‍ | 2 | – | 6 | .250 | | – | | – |
Southern
| North Carolina ^{x}‍‍‍ | 11 | – | 3 | .786 | 19 | – | 8 | .704 |
| Duke ‍‍‡‍^{y} | 9 | – | 5 | .643 | 22 | – | 10 | .688 |
| Clemson ‍‍‍ | 10 | – | 6 | .625 | 11 | – | 6 | .647 |
| Wake Forest ‍‍‍ | 8 | – | 5 | .615 | 15 | – | 5 | .750 |
| NC State ‍‍‍ | 7 | – | 6 | .538 | | – | | – |
| Furman ‍‍‍ | 7 | – | 8 | .467 | | – | | – |
| The Citadel ‍‍‍ | 7 | – | 10 | .412 | | – | | – |
| South Carolina ‍‍‍ | 7 | – | 11 | .389 | | – | | – |
| Davidson ‍‍‍ | 0 | – | 12 | .000 | | – | | – |
x – Division champion ‡ – Tournament champion y – Invited to the College World Series; As of June 30, 1953; Rankings from Collegiate Baseball

The 1953 Southern Conference baseball tournament was held in Raleigh, North Carolina, from May 14 through 16. This was the league's final championship tournament to be held until 1984, as seven schools, including three participants in the tournament, departed the conference to form the Atlantic Coast Conference after the season. Modern Southern Conference baseball records begin with the 1954 baseball season. The South Division's second seed Duke won the tournament for the third time.

== Seeding ==
The top two teams from each division participated in the tournament. Complete standings are not available, but the teams below all fielded baseball teams within the Southern Conference.

| Team | W | L | PCT | GB | Seed |
|---|---|---|---|---|---|
North Division
| George Washington | 8 | 2 | .800 | – | 1N |
| Maryland | 8 | 2 | .800 | – | 2N |
| Richmond | 5 | 5 | .500 | 3 | – |
| Virginia Tech | 4 | 5 | .444 | 3.5 | – |
| VMI | 4 | 5 | .444 | 3.5 | – |
| Washington and Lee | 3 | 6 | .333 | 4.5 | – |
| West Virginia | 2 | 5 | .286 | 4.5 | – |
| William & Mary | 2 | 6 | .250 | 5 | – |
South Division
| North Carolina | 11 | 3 | .786 | – | 1S |
| Duke | 9 | 5 | .643 | 2 | 2S |
| Clemson | 10 | 6 | .625 | 2 | – |
| Wake Forest | 8 | 5 | .615 | 2.5 | – |
| NC State | 7 | 6 | .538 | 3.5 | – |
| Furman | 7 | 8 | .467 | 4.5 | – |
| The Citadel | 7 | 10 | .412 | 5.5 | – |
| South Carolina | 7 | 11 | .389 | 6 | – |
| Davidson | 0 | 12 | .000 | 10 | – |

== Bracket ==
First round
1N | George Washington | 4
2S | Duke | 6
1S | North Carolina | 13
2N | Maryland | 2
Lower round 1
1N | George Washington | 6
2N | Maryland | 4

Semi-finals
2S | Duke | 7
1S | North Carolina | 2
Lower final
1S | North Carolina | 15
1N | George Washington | 0

Finals
2S | Duke | 5 | —
1S | North Carolina | 3 | —
