= 1956 Washington State Cougars baseball team =

College baseball team representing Washington State College

1956 Washington State Cougars baseball

PCC Northern Division champion PCC Champion District VIII champion

College World Series, T-7th
- Conference: Pacific Coast Conference
- Northern
- Record: 28–8 (11–3 PCC)
- Head coach: Buck Bailey (30th season)
- Captain: Jerry Bartow
- Home stadium: Bailey Field

1956 Pacific Coast Conference baseball standings
	Conf.						Overall
Team	W		L		T	PCT	W		L		T	PCT
North Division
Washington State ‍†‍‍^{y}	11	–	3	–	0	.786	28	–	8	–	0	.778
Oregon ‍‍‍	8	–	5	–	0	.615	18	–	8	–	0	.692
Oregon State ‍‍‍	7	–	8	–	0	.467	17	–	13	–	0	.567
Washington ‍‍‍	5	–	9	–	0	.357	5	–	11	–	0	.313
Idaho ‍‍‍	4	–	9	–	0	.308	0	–	0	–	0	–
California Intercollegiate Baseball Association
USC ‍†‍‍	14	–	2	–	0	.875	21	–	5	–	0	.808
California ‍‍‍	9	–	7	–	0	.563	25	–	9	–	0	.735
Stanford ‍‍‍	9	–	7	–	0	.563	24	–	10	–	1	.700
UCLA ‍‍‍	5	–	11	–	0	.313	11	–	21	–	2	.353
Santa Clara ‍‍‍	3	–	13	–	0	.188	6	–	22	–	0	.214
† – Conference champion y – Invited to the NCAA tournament

The 1956 Washington State Cougars baseball team represented the Washington State College in the 1956 NCAA baseball season. The Cougars played their home games at Bailey Field. The team was coached by Buck Bailey in his 30th year as head coach at Washington State.

The Cougars won the District VIII to advance to the College World Series, where they were defeated by the New Hampshire Wildcats.

== Roster ==
1956 Washington State Cougars baseball team
Players
Coaches
f

#	Pos.	Name	B/T	Height	Weight	Year	Home town
	RHP	Ron Aiken	/R	—	—	Jr
	LHP	Jerry Bartow (C)	/L	—	—	Sr
		Bruce Boldt	/	—	—
	P	John Cavallini	/	—	—
	INF	Ron Foisy	/R	—	—	Sr
	RHP	John Freeman	/R	—	—
		Jeff Hardman	/R	—	—	Sr
	INF	Gordon Hersey	/R	—	—	Sr
		Duane Lebow	/	—	—
	OF	Henry Legge	/	—	—
	INF	Bill Mashburn	/R	—	—	Sr
	P	Don Nieland	/	—	—
	OF	Ron Overby	R/	—	—
	RHP	George Plummer	/R	—	—
	C	Bill Rich	/R	—	—
	OF	Joe Trembly	R/	—	—
	C	Bucky Walters	/	—	—
		Gary Whiting	/	—	—	So
	INF	Mo Winter	/	—	—	So

Head coach

Buck Bailey

Assistant coach(es)

Legend

- (C) Team captain
- (S) Suspended
- (I) Ineligible
- Injured
- Current redshirt

Roster
Last update: May 3, 2021

== Schedule ==
1956 Washington State Cougars baseball game log
Regular season
March (2–2)

#	Date	Opponent	Site/stadium	Score	Overall record	PCC record
1	March 24	vs Oregon State	Bengal Field • Lewiston, Idaho	3–4	0–1	0–0
2	March 24	vs Oregon State	Bengal Field • Lewiston, Idaho	3–4	0–2	0–0
3	March 30	at Whitman	Unknown • Walla Walla, Washington	–	1–2	0–0
4	March 31	at Washington State Penitentiary	Unknown • Walla Walla, Washington	–	2–2	0–0

April (11–0)

#	Date	Opponent	Site/stadium	Score	Overall record	PCC record
10	April 10	Whitman	Bailey Field • Pullman, Washington	6–1	7–3	0–0
11	April 10	Whitman	Bailey Field • Pullman, Washington	4–0	8–3	0–0
12	April 14	Yakima	Bailey Field • Pullman, Washington	5–1	9–3	0–0
13	April 14	Yakima	Bailey Field • Pullman, Washington	3–2	10–3	0–0
14	April 17	Gonzaga	Bailey Field • Pullman, Washington	4–0	11–3	0–0
15	April 17	Gonzaga	Bailey Field • Pullman, Washington	17–7	12–3	0–0
16	April 20	Eastern Washington	Bailey Field • Pullman, Washington	8–2	13–3	0–0
17	April 20	Eastern Washington	Bailey Field • Pullman, Washington	7–3	14–3	0–0
18	April 23	Washington	Bailey Field • Pullman, Washington	8–7	15–3	1–0
19	April 24	Washington	Bailey Field • Pullman, Washington	9–2	16–3	2–0
20	April 27	at Washington	Graves Field • Seattle, Washington	7–3	17–3	3–0
21	April 28	at Washington	Graves Field • Seattle, Washington	18–1	18–3	4–0
22	April 30	at Oregon State	Coleman Field • Corvallis, Oregon	7–5	19–3	5–0

May (6–3)

#	Date	Opponent	Site/stadium	Score	Overall record	PCC record
23	May 1	at Oregon State	Coleman Field • Corvallis, Oregon	12–6	20–3	6–0
24	May 2	at Oregon	Howe Field • Eugene, Oregon	10–4	21–3	7–0
25	May 3	Oregon	Bailey Field • Pullman, Washington	9–13	21–4	7–1
26	May 7	Idaho	Bailey Field • Pullman, Washington	1–2	21–5	7–2
27	May 14	Oregon State	Bailey Field • Pullman, Washington	4–0	22–5	8–2
28	May 15	Oregon State	Bailey Field • Pullman, Washington	9–3	23–5	9–2
29	May 18	Oregon	Bailey Field • Pullman, Washington	8–6	24–5	10–2
30	May 19	Oregon	Bailey Field • Pullman, Washington	2–4	24–6	10–3
31	May 26	at Idaho	MacLean Field • Moscow, Idaho	1–2	25–6	11–3

Postseason
NCAA District VIII Playoff (2–0)

#	Date	Opponent	Site/stadium	Score	Overall record	PCC record
33	June 1	vs Southern California	Bailey Field • Pullman, Washington	6–2	27–6	11–3
34	June 2	vs Southern California	Bailey Field • Pullman, Washington	5–4	28–6	11–3

College World Series (0–2)

#	Date	Opponent	Site/stadium	Score	Overall record	PCC record
35	June 9	vs Bradley	Johnny Rosenblatt Stadium • Omaha, Nebraska	3–4	28–7	11–3
36	June 10	vs New Hampshire	Johnny Rosenblatt Stadium • Omaha, Nebraska	4–6	28–8	11–3

== Awards and honors ==
Ron Aiken

- First Team All-District VIII

Bill Rich

- Third Team All-American
- First Team All-District VIII
