= 1953 Duke Blue Devils baseball team =

American college baseball season

1953 Duke Blue Devils baseball

Southern Conference Tournament champions District III champions

College World Series, T-5th
- Conference: Southern Conference
- Southern
- Record: 22–10 (9–5 SoCon)
- Head coach: Ace Parker (1st season)
- Captain: Billy Lea
- Home stadium: Jack Coombs Field

1953 Southern Conference baseball standings
	Conf.				Overall
Team	W		L	PCT	W		L	PCT
Northern
George Washington ^{x}‍‍‍	8	–	2	.800		–		–
Maryland ‍‍‍	8	–	2	.800	16	–	7	.696
Richmond ‍‍‍	5	–	5	.500	9	–	9	.500
Virginia Tech ‍‍‍	4	–	5	.444	6	–	7	.462
VMI ‍‍‍	4	–	5	.444		–		–
Washington and Lee ‍‍‍	3	–	6	.333		–		–
West Virginia ‍‍‍	2	–	5	.286		–		–
William & Mary ‍‍‍	2	–	6	.250		–		–
Southern
North Carolina ^{x}‍‍‍	11	–	3	.786	19	–	8	.704
Duke ‍‍‡‍^{y}	9	–	5	.643	22	–	10	.688
Clemson ‍‍‍	10	–	6	.625	11	–	6	.647
Wake Forest ‍‍‍	8	–	5	.615	15	–	5	.750
NC State ‍‍‍	7	–	6	.538		–		–
Furman ‍‍‍	7	–	8	.467		–		–
The Citadel ‍‍‍	7	–	10	.412		–		–
South Carolina ‍‍‍	7	–	11	.389		–		–
Davidson ‍‍‍	0	–	12	.000		–		–
x – Division champion ‡ – Tournament champion y – Invited to the College World Series; As of June 30, 1953; Rankings from Collegiate Baseball

The 1953 Duke Blue Devils baseball team represented Duke University in the 1953 NCAA baseball season. The Blue Devils played their home games at Jack Coombs Field. The team was coached by Ace Parker in his 1st year at Duke.

The Blue Devils won the District III playoff to advanced to the College World Series, where they were defeated by the Boston College Eagles.

== Roster ==
1953 Duke Blue Devils baseball team
Players
Coaches

#	Pos.	Name	B/T	Height	Weight	Year	Home town
		Dick Brewer	/	—	—	So
		Charlie Carter	/	—	—
	P	George Carver	/	—	—	Sr
		Gordon Clapp	/	—	—	Jr
		Carl Dickey	/	—	—
		Bill Donigan	/	—	—
	INF	W. D. Fesperman	/	—	—	So
		Johnny Gibbons	/	—	—	Sr
		Billy Goodman	/	—	—
		Earle Hannel	/	—	—
		Dick Kreutzer	/	—	—	So
		Bill Lea	/	—	—	Sr	Lynchburg, Virginia
		Bob Leclercq	/	—	—	So
	RHP	Joe Lewis	/R	—	—	Jr
	OF	Red Smith	/	—	—	Jr
		Don Snowberger	/	—	—	So	New Brighton, Pennsylvania
	OF	Al Spangler	/	—	—
	C	John Tarr	/	—	—	Jr
		Ray Weddle	/	—	—
	INF	Bill Werber	/	—	—	Sr

Head coach

Ace Parker

Assistant coach(es)

Legend

- (C) Team captain
- (S) Suspended
- (I) Ineligible
- Injured
- Current redshirt

== Schedule ==
1953 Duke Blue Devils baseball game log
Regular season
March (3–2)

#	Date	Opponent	Site/stadium	Score	Overall record	SoCon Record
1	March 25	at Furman	Unknown • Greenville, South Carolina	4–5	0–1	0–1
2	March 26	at Clemson	Riggs Field • Clemson, South Carolina	5–4	1–1	1–1
3	March 27	at Davidson	Unknown • Davidson, North Carolina	11–2	2–1	2–1
4	March 30	Penn	Jack Coombs Field • Durham, North Carolina	11–3	3–1	2–1
5	March 31	Penn	Jack Coombs Field • Durham, North Carolina	5–6	3–2	2–1

April (8–3)

#	Date	Opponent	Site/stadium	Score	Overall record	SoCon Record
6	April 1	Lehigh	Jack Coombs Field • Durham, North Carolina	17–14	4–2	2–1
7	April 2	Michigan State	Jack Coombs Field • Durham, North Carolina	1–0	5–2	2–1
8	April 3	Michigan State	Jack Coombs Field • Durham, North Carolina	7–3	6–2	2–1
9	April 4	Williams	Jack Coombs Field • Durham, North Carolina	2–7	6–3	2–1
10	April 11	Wake Forest	Jack Coombs Field • Durham, North Carolina	8–4	7–3	3–1
11	April 15	at NC State	Riddick Stadium • Raleigh, North Carolina	12–4	8–3	4–1
12	April 18	Davidson	Jack Coombs Field • Durham, North Carolina	15–4	9–3	5–1
13	April 21	at North Carolina	Emerson Field • Chapel Hill, North Carolina	2–5	9–4	5–2
14	April 22	at Wake Forest	Unknown • Winston-Salem, North Carolina	1–4	9–5	5–3
15	April 25	NC State	Jack Coombs Field • Durham, North Carolina	23–3	10–5	6–3
16	April 28	at Navy	Unknown • Annapolis, Maryland	4–1	11–5	6–3

May (3–2)

#	Date	Opponent	Site/stadium	Score	Overall record	SoCon Record
17	May 2	South Carolina	Jack Coombs Field • Durham, North Carolina	4–0	12–5	7–3
18	May 4	at North Carolina	Emerson Field • Chapel Hill, North Carolina	4–2	13–5	8–3
19	May 5	at NC State	Riddick Stadium • Raleigh, North Carolina	0–5	13–6	8–4
20	May 8	Wake Forest	Jack Coombs Field • Durham, North Carolina	4–1	14–6	9–4
21	May 9	North Carolina	Jack Coombs Field • Durham, North Carolina	1–3	14–7	9–5

Postseason
Southern Conference Tournament (3–0)

#	Date	Opponent	Site/stadium	Score	Overall record	SoCon Record
22	May 14	vs George Washington	Devereaux Meadow • Raleigh, North Carolina	6–4	15–7	9–5
23	May 15	vs North Carolina	Devereaux Meadow • Raleigh, North Carolina	7–2	16–7	9–5
24	May 16	vs North Carolina	Devereaux Meadow • Raleigh, North Carolina	8–4	17–7	9–5

District III Playoff (4–1)

#	Date	Opponent	Site/stadium	Score	Overall record	SoCon Record
25	June 2	vs Mississippi State	Unknown • Charlotte, North Carolina	9–1	18–7	9–5
26	June 3	vs Georgia	Unknown • Charlotte, North Carolina	4–9	18–8	9–5
27	June 3	vs Mississippi State	Unknown • Charlotte, North Carolina	5–4	19–8	9–5
28	June 4	vs Georgia	Unknown • Charlotte, North Carolina	9–1	20–8	9–5
29	June 4	vs Georgia	Unknown • Charlotte, North Carolina	11–3	21–8	9–5

College World Series (1–2)

#	Date	Opponent	Site/stadium	Score	Overall record	SoCon Record
30	June 11	vs Texas	Omaha Municipal Stadium • Omaha, Nebraska	1–2	21–9	9–5
31	June 12	vs Colorado State	Omaha Municipal Stadium • Omaha, Nebraska	3–2	22–9	9–5
32	June 13	vs Boston College	Omaha Municipal Stadium • Omaha, Nebraska	6–7	22–10	9–5
