= 1953 Colorado State Bears baseball team =

American college baseball season

1953 Colorado State Bears baseball

Rocky Mountain Conference champions District VII playoff champions

College World Series, T-7th
- Conference: Rocky Mountain Conference
- Record: 14–7 (8–1 RMC)
- Head coach: Pete Butler (11th season)
- Home stadium: Jackson Field

1953 Rocky Mountain Conference baseball standings
	Conf.				Overall
Team	W		L	PCT	W		L	PCT
Colorado State ‍†‍‍^{y}	8	–	1	.889	14	–	7	.667
Colorado College ‍‍‍	4	–	3	.571		–		–
Western State ‍‍‍	2	–	2	.500		–		–
Colorado Mines ‍‍‍	0	–	8	.000	0	–	8	.000
† – Conference champion y – Invited to the College World Series; As of June 30, 1953; Rankings from Collegiate Baseball

The 1953 Colorado State Bears baseball team represented Colorado State College of Education in the 1953 NCAA baseball season. The Bears played their home games at Jackson Field. The team was coached by Pete Butler in his 11th year at Colorado State.

The Bears won the District VII playoff to advance to the College World Series, where they were defeated by the Duke Blue Devils.

== Roster ==
1953 Colorado State Bears baseball team
Players
Coaches

#	Pos.	Name	B/T	Height	Weight	Year	Home town
		Ronnie Capra	/R	—	—	Jr
	INF	Jim Ditolla	/R	—	—
	RHP	Bob Gill	/R	—	—
		D Figliolino	/R	—	—
	RHP	Gene Haggerty	/R	—	—
	C	Kent Hill	/R	—	—
		Richard Howerton	/	—	—
		B Kardula	/R	—	—
		Bob Lanari	/	—	—
		Bob Mantooth	/R	—	—
		Bob McAfee	L/	—	—	Sr
	C	Jerry McMillen	/R	—	—
		Al Minaya	/	—	—	Jr
		Dick Porter	/R	—	—
		George Sage	/L	—	—	Jr
	RHP	Bob Stewart	/R	—	—	Sr
		Lou Tanka	/R	—	—
		Jerry Tancredo	/R	—	—
		Art Wallenweber	/	—	—
	C	Dick Weed	/R	—	—

Head coach

Pete Butler

Assistant coach(es)

Legend

- (C) Team captain
- (S) Suspended
- (I) Ineligible
- Injured
- Current redshirt

== Schedule ==
1953 Colorado State Bears baseball game log
Regular season
April (5–2)

#	Date	Opponent	Site/stadium	Score	Overall record	RMC record
1	April 3	at Colorado Mines	Unknown • Golden, Colorado	10–4	1–0	1–0
2	April 4	at Colorado Mines	Unknown • Golden, Colorado	12–0	2–0	2–0
3	April 10	Lowry Air Force Base	Jackson Field • Greeley, Colorado	3–14	2–1	2–0
4	April 21	at Warren Air Force Base	Unknown • Cheyenne, Wyoming	0–6	2–2	2–0
5	April 24	Colorado College	Jackson Field • Greeley, Colorado	7–4	3–2	3–0
6	April 25	Colorado College	Jackson Field • Greeley, Colorado	15–9	4–2	4–0
7	April 28	at Denver	Unknown • Denver, Colorado	8–5	5–2	4–0

May (7–2)

#	Date	Opponent	Site/stadium	Score	Overall record	RMC record
8	May 1	Colorado Mines	Jackson Field • Greeley, Colorado	9–1	6–2	5–0
9	May 2	at Colorado Mines	Unknown • Golden, Colorado	8–1	7–2	6–0
10	May 5	at Warren Air Force Base	Unknown • Cheyenne, Wyoming	13–11	8–2	6–0
11	May 8	at Western State	Unknown • Gunnison, Colorado	15–1	9–2	7–0
12	May 9	at Western State	Unknown • Gunnison, Colorado	7–10	9–3	7–1
13	May 15	at Colorado College	Stewart Field • Colorado Springs, Colorado	6–5	10–3	8–1
14	May 19	at Fitzsimons Army Medical Center	Unknown • Aurora, Colorado	19–3	11–3	8–1
15	May 22	Fitzsimons Army Medical Center	Jackson Field • Greeley, Colorado	6–2	12–3	8–1
16	May	Warren Air Force Base	Jackson Field • Greeley, Colorado	2–9	12–4	8–1

Postseason
District VII Playoff (2–1)

#	Date	Opponent	Site/stadium	Score	Overall record	RMC record
17	May	at Utah	Derks Field • Salt Lake City, Utah	3–6	12–5	8–1
18	May	at Utah	Derks Field • Salt Lake City, Utah	8–5	13–5	8–1
19	May	at Utah	Derks Field • Salt Lake City, Utah	4–0	14–5	8–1

College World Series (0–2)

#	Date	Opponent	Site/stadium	Score	Overall record	RMC record
20	June 11	vs Lafayette	Omaha Municipal Stadium • Omaha, Nebraska	2–6	14–6	8–1
21	June 12	vs Duke	Omaha Municipal Stadium • Omaha, Nebraska	2–3	14–7	8–1
