= 1953 Stanford Indians baseball team =

American college baseball season

1953 Stanford Indians baseball

California Intercollegiate Baseball Association champions District VIII champions

College World Series, T-5th
- Conference: California Intercollegiate Baseball Association
- Record: 29–15–2 (10–6 CIBA)
- Head coach: Everett Dean (4th season)
- Home stadium: Sunken Diamond

1953 Pacific Coast Conference baseball standings
	Conf.						Overall
Team	W		L		T	PCT	W		L		T	PCT
North Division
Oregon ‍†‍‍	9	–	3	–	0	.750	15	–	4	–	0	.789
Oregon State ‍‍‍	8	–	3	–	0	.727	15	–	9	–	0	.625
Washington State ‍‍‍	8	–	8	–	0	.500	14	–	14	–	1	.500
Idaho ‍‍‍	6	–	7	–	0	.462	0	–	0	–	0	–
Washington ‍‍‍	1	–	11	–	0	.083	4	–	15	–	1	.225
California Intercollegiate Baseball Association
Stanford ‍†‍‍^{y}	10	–	6	–	0	.625	29	–	5	–	2	.833
USC ‍‍‍	10	–	6	–	0	.625	21	–	9	–	0	.700
California ‍‍‍	8	–	8	–	0	.500	22	–	15	–	0	.595
Santa Clara ‍‍‍	6	–	10	–	0	.375	14	–	15	–	0	.483
UCLA ‍‍‍	6	–	10	–	0	.375	16	–	20	–	0	.444
† – Conference champion y – Invited to the NCAA tournament

The 1953 Stanford Indians baseball team represented Stanford University in the 1953 NCAA baseball season. The Indians played their home games at Sunken Diamond. The team was coached by Everett Dean in his 4th year at Stanford.

The Indians won the District VIII Playoff to advanced to the College World Series, where they were defeated by the Lafayette Leopards.

== Roster ==
1953 Stanford Indians baseball team
Players
Coaches

#	Pos.	Name	B/T	Height	Weight	Year	Home town
		Michael Acker	/	—	—
		Ken Brown	/	—	—
		Richard Cole	/	—	—
		Thomas Dandurand	/	—	—
		Donald DeLong	/	—	—
		Chuck Essegian	/	—	—
		Howard Evans	/	—	—
		Warren Goodrich	/	—	—
		John Hall	/	—	—
		Harold Hennacy	/	—	—
		Rodger Irvine	/	—	—
	P	Rob Murphy	/	—	—
		Philip Page	/	—	—
		David Rosenkrantz	/	—	—
		Richard Scramaglia	/	—	—
	C	Jack Shepard	/	—	—
		Ray Swarts	/	—	—
		Alan Talboy	/	—	—

Head coach

Everett Dean

Assistant coach(es)

Legend

- (C) Team captain
- (S) Suspended
- (I) Ineligible
- Injured
- Current redshirt

== Schedule ==
1953 Stanford Indians baseball game log
Regular season
March (0–0)

#	Date	Opponent	Site/stadium	Score	Overall record	CIBA record
	March 27	at Southern California	Bovard Field • Los Angeles, California	7–1	–	–
	March 28	at Southern California	Bovard Field • Los Angeles, California	5–2	–	–

April (0–0)

#	Date	Opponent	Site/stadium	Score	Overall record	CIBA record
	April	UCLA	Unknown • Unknown	0–1	–	–
	April	UCLA	Unknown • Unknown	4–12	–	–
	April 24	Southern California	Sunken Diamond • Stanford, California	11–10	–	–

May (0–0)

#	Date	Opponent	Site/stadium	Score	Overall record	CIBA record
	May	UCLA	Unknown • Unknown	2–0	–	–
	May	UCLA	Unknown • Unknown	6–10	–	–

Postseason
District VIII Playoff (0–0)

#	Date	Opponent	Site/stadium	Score	Overall record	CIBA record

College World Series (1–2)

#	Date	Opponent	Site/stadium	Score	Overall record	CIBA record
34	June 11	vs Michigan	Omaha Municipal Stadium • Omaha, Nebraska	0–4	28–4–2	10–6
35	June 12	vs Houston	Omaha Municipal Stadium • Omaha, Nebraska	7–6	29–4–2	10–6
36	June 13	vs Lafayette	Omaha Municipal Stadium • Omaha, Nebraska	3–4	29–5–2	10–6

== Awards and honors ==
Jack Shepard

- First Team All-American American Baseball Coaches Association
