= 1956 Bradley Braves baseball team =

American college baseball season

1956 Bradley Braves baseball

Missouri Valley regular season champions Missouri Valley Tournament champions District V Playoff champions

College World Series, T-3rd
- Conference: Missouri Valley Conference
- Record: 24–8 (7–2 MVC)
- Head coach: Leo Schrall (8th season)
- Home stadium: Tom Connor Field

1956 Missouri Valley Conference baseball standings
	Conf.				Overall
Team	W		L	PCT	W		L	PCT
Bradley ‍†‍‡‍^{y}	7	–	2	.778	27	–	8	.771
Oklahoma A&M ‍‍‍	7	–	2	.778	11	–	10	.524
Saint Louis ‍‍‍	6	–	3	.667	13	–	6	.684
Houston ‍‍‍	5	–	4	.556	14	–	10	.583
Tulsa ‍‍‍	5	–	4	.556	8	–	12	.400
Detroit ‍‍‍	4	–	5	.444	9	–	11	.450
Wichita State ‍‍‍	1	–	8	.111	4	–	13	.235
Drake ‍‍‍	1	–	8	.111	4	–	13	.235
† – Conference champion ‡ – Tournament champion y – Invited to the NCAA tournament As of June 30, 1956; Rankings from Coaches' Poll

The 1956 Bradley Braves baseball team represented Bradley University in the 1956 NCAA baseball season. The Braves played their home games at Tom Connor Field. The team was coached by Leo Schrall in his 8th year at Bradley.

The Braves won the District V playoff to advance to the College World Series, where they were defeated by the Minnesota Golden Gophers.

== Roster ==
1956 Bradley Braves baseball team
Players
Coaches

#	Pos.	Name	B/T	Height	Weight	Year	Home town
		Del Bireline	/	—	—		Peoria, Illinois
		John Burnham	/	—	—		Peoria, Illinois
	P	Wyman Carey	/	—	—		Blue Island, Illinois
		Fred Davis	/	—	—	So	Peoria, Illinois
		Carl Gottlieb	/	—	—	Jr	Peoria, Illinois
		Don Groves	/	—	—	So	Marion, Illinois
		Don Hakes	/	—	—		Chicago, Illinois
		Mike Kesseler	/	—	—	So	Peoria, Illinois
	P	Ron Lundgren	/	—	—		Varna, Illinois
		Billy Martin	/	—	—		Aurora, Illinois
		Jim Stanczak	/	—	—	Sr	Waukegan, Illinois
		Ed Taylor	/	—	—	Sr	Peoria, Illinois
		Lee Utt	/	—	—	Sr	Decatur, Illinois
	P	Ralph Wenk	/	—	—	Sr
		Dave Wright	/	—	—		Danville, Illinois
		Donald Wyss	/	—	—		Peoria, Illinois

Head coach

Leo Schrall

Assistant coach(es)

Legend

- (C) Team captain
- (S) Suspended
- (I) Ineligible
- Injured
- Current redshirt

== Schedule ==
1956 Bradley Braves baseball game log
Regular season
April (14–2)

#	Date	Opponent	Site/stadium	Score	Overall record	MVC record
1	April	at Alabama State	Unknown • Montgomery, Alabama	11–1	1–0	–
2	April	at Pensacola NAS	Unknown • Pensacola, Florida	13–3	2–0	–
3	April	at Pensacola NAS	Unknown • Pensacola, Florida	24–14	3–0	–
4	April	at Whiting NAS	Unknown • Milton, Florida	13–5	4–0	–
5	April	at Whiting NAS	Unknown • Milton, Florida	10–7	5–0	–
6	April	at Fort Benning	Unknown • Fort Benning South, Georgia	7–3	6–0	–
7	April	at Fort Benning	Unknown • Fort Benning South, Georgia	4–5	6–1	–
8	April	at Drake	Unknown • Des Moines, Iowa	10–5	7–1	1–0
9	April	at Drake	Unknown • Des Moines, Iowa	16–2	8–1	2–0
10	April	at Drake	Unknown • Des Moines, Iowa	7–3	9–1	3–0
11	April	Detroit	Tom Connor Field • Peoria, Illinois	5–4	10–1	4–0
12	April	Detroit	Tom Connor Field • Peoria, Illinois	20–6	11–1	5–0
13	April	Detroit	Tom Connor Field • Peoria, Illinois	14–2	12–1	6–0
14	April	at Iowa	Unknown • Iowa City, Iowa	6–2	13–1	6–0
15	April	at Iowa	Unknown • Iowa City, Iowa	2–7	13–2	6–0
16	April	Saint Joseph's	Tom Connor Field • Peoria, Illinois	16–3	14–2	6–0

May (5–4)

#	Date	Opponent	Site/stadium	Score	Overall record	MVC record
17	May	Northern Illinois	Tom Connor Field • Peoria, Illinois	9–1	15–2	6–0
18	May	at Saint Louis	Sauget Field • Sauget, Illinois	3–5	15–3	6–1
19	May	at Saint Louis	Sauget Field • Sauget, Illinois	3–5	15–4	6–2
20	May	at Saint Louis	Sauget Field • Sauget, Illinois	7–1	16–4	7–2
21	May	at Illinois State	Unknown • Normal, Illinois	5–15	16–5	7–2
22	May	Washington University	Tom Connor Field • Peoria, Illinois	11–6	17–5	7–2
23	May	Washington University	Tom Connor Field • Peoria, Illinois	11–12	17–6	7–2
24	May 22	at Purdue	Unknown • West Lafayette, Indiana	4–3	18–6	7–2
25	May 25	Southern Illinois	Tom Connor Field • Peoria, Illinois	2–1	19–6	7–2

Postseason
MVC Tournament (2–1)

#	Date	Opponent	Site/stadium	Score	Overall record	MVC record
26	May 11	at Oklahoma A&M	Unknown • Stillwater, Oklahoma	13–10	20–6	7–2
27	May 12	at Oklahoma A&M	Unknown • Stillwater, Oklahoma	16–2	21–6	7–2

District V Playoff (1–0)

#	Date	Opponent	Site/stadium	Score	Overall record	MVC record
28	May	vs North Dakota State	Unknown • Stillwater, Oklahoma	11–2	22–6	7–2

College World Series (2–2)

#	Date	Opponent	Site/stadium	Score	Overall record	MVC record
28	June 9	vs Washington State	Omaha Municipal Stadium • Omaha, Nebraska	4–3	23–6	7–2
29	June 10	vs Ole Miss	Omaha Municipal Stadium • Omaha, Nebraska	0–4	23–7	7–2
30	June 11	vs Wyoming	Omaha Municipal Stadium • Omaha, Nebraska	12–8	24–7	7–2
31	June 12	vs Minnesota	Omaha Municipal Stadium • Omaha, Nebraska	3–8	24–8	7–2
