= 1953 College World Series =

1953 NCAA I baseball tournament
- Season: 1953
- Teams: 8
- Finals site: Johnny Rosenblatt Stadium; Omaha, NE
- Champions: Michigan (1st title)
- Runner-up: Texas (4th CWS Appearance)
- Winning coach: Ray Fisher (1st title)
- MOP: J. L. Smith (Texas)

The 1953 College World Series was the seventh NCAA-sanctioned baseball tournament that determined a national champion. The tournament was held as the conclusion of the 1953 NCAA baseball season and was played at Johnny Rosenblatt Stadium in Omaha, NE from June 11 to June 16. The tournament's champion was Michigan, coached by Ray Fisher. The Most Outstanding Player was J. L. Smith of Texas.

The tournament consisted of no preliminary round of play as teams were selected directly into the College World Series. From 1954 to the present, teams compete in the NCAA Division I baseball tournament preliminary round(s), to determine the eight teams that will play in the College World Series.

== Participants ==
School	Conference	Record (conference)	Head coach	CWS appearances	CWS best finish	CWS record	Berth
Boston College	Independent	11–3	John Temple	0 (last: none)	none	0–0	District I
Colorado State College (Note: Colorado State College is currently known as the University of Northern Colorado. Not to be confused with Colorado State University, then known as Colorado A&M.)	RMC	15–4 (9–1)	Pete Butler	1 (last: 1952)	8th (1952)	0–2	District VII
Duke	Southern	21–8 (9–5)	Ace Parker	1 (last: 1952)	5th (1952)	1–2	District III
Houston	MVC	15–9 (6–2)	Lovette Hill	0 (last: none)	none	0–0	District V
Lafayette	Independent	17–3–3	Charlie Gelbert	0 (last: none)	none	0–0	Won District II Playoff
Michigan	Big 10	17–8 (10–3)	Ray Fisher	0 (last: none)	none	0–0	District IV
Stanford	CIBA	28–13–2 (10–6)	Everett Dean	0 (last: none)	none	0–0	District VIII
Texas	SWC	21–5 (12–3)	Bibb Falk	3 (last: 1952)	1st (1949, 1950)	9–3	District VI

== Results ==
=== Bracket ===
Upper round 1
Texas	2
Duke	1
Lafayette	6
Colorado State College	2
Boston College	4
Houston	1
Michigan	4
Stanford	0

Upper round 2
Texas	7
Lafayette	2
Boston College	3
Michigan	6
Lower round 1
Duke	3
Colorado State College	2
Houston	6
Stanford	7

Upper final
Texas	5
Michigan	12
Lower round 2
Boston College	7^{11}
Duke	6
Lafayette	4
Stanford	3

Semifinals
Michigan	4
Texas	6
Boston College	1
Lafayette	2^{11}

Preliminary final
Texas	13
Lafayette	3

Final
Michigan	7
Texas	5

=== Game results ===
Date	Game	Winner	Score	Loser	Notes
June 11	Game 1	Texas	2–1	Duke	
June 11	Game 2	Boston College	4–1	Houston	
June 11	Game 3	Lafayette	6–2	Colorado State College	
June 11	Game 4	Michigan	4–0	Stanford	
June 12	Game 5	Duke	3–2	Colorado State College	Colorado State College eliminated
June 12	Game 6	Stanford	7–6	Houston	Houston eliminated
June 12	Game 7	Michigan	6–2	Boston College	
June 12	Game 8	Texas	7–3	Lafayette	
June 13	Game 9	Boston College	7–6 (11)	Duke	Duke eliminated
June 13	Game 10	Lafayette	4–3	Stanford	Stanford eliminated
June 13	Game 11	Michigan	12–5	Texas	
June 14	Game 12	Lafayette	2–1 (11)	Boston College	Boston College eliminated
June 14	Game 13	Texas	6–4	Michigan	
June 15	Game 14	Texas	13–3	Lafayette	Lafayette eliminated
June 16	Final	Michigan	7–5	Texas	Michigan wins CWS

== Notable players ==
- Boston College:
- Colorado State College:
- Duke: Al Spangler
- Houston: Bobby Clatterbuck, Carlton Hanta
- Lafayette:
- Michigan: Don Eaddy
- Stanford: Chuck Essegian, Jack Shepard
- Texas:J. L. Smith
