= 1953 Lafayette Leopards baseball team =

American college baseball season

1953 Lafayette Leopards baseball

District II champions

College World Series, 3rd
- Conference: Independent
- Record: 20–5–3
- Head coach: Charlie Gelbert (8th season)
- Captain: Gordon Leslie
- Home stadium: Fisher Field

The 1953 Lafayette Leopards baseball team represented Lafayette College in the 1953 NCAA baseball season. The Leopards played their home games at Fisher Field. The team was coached by Charlie Gelbert in his 8th year at Lafayette.

The Leopards won the District II Playoff to advanced to the College World Series, where they were defeated by the Texas Longhorns.

== Roster ==
1953 Lafayette Leopards baseball team
Players
Coaches

#	Pos.	Name	B/T	Height	Weight	Year	Home town
	P	Joe Callahan	/	—	—
	INF	Ed Deorrman	/	—	—
	C	Maynard Dill	/	—	—	So	Wilmington, Delaware
	OF	Don Divine	/	—	—
	INF	Joe Dixon	/	—	—	So	Easton, Pennsylvania
	P	Karl Dutt	/	—	—	So
	INF	Chuck Eyer	/	—	—	Jr	Emmaus, Pennsylvania
	INF	Don Gold	/	—	—
	RHP	Roger Gordon	/R	—	—	So	Wilmington, Delaware
	INF	Bill Hogerty	/	—	—	So	Princeton, New Jersey
	INF	Ray Hunt	R/R	—	—	Sr	New Brunswick, New Jersey
	OF	Bob Johnson	/	—	—
	P	Bob Ketchel	/	—	—	Sr
	OF	Jack Ketrick	/	—	—
	OF	Chuck Kuehn	/	—	—	Sr	New York, New York
	P	Dana Lesher	/	—	—
	OF	Gordon Leslie (C)	/	—	—	Sr	Woodlynne, New Jersey
	LHP	Don Owens	/L	—	—	So
	OF	Chick Quigg	/	—	—
	OF	Ron San Giovanni	/	—	—
	OF	Bob Renfrow	/	—	—
	OF	George Richardson	/	—	—	So	Merrick, New York
	P	Dick Somers	/	—	—
	INF	Bill Vercelli	/	—	—	So	Cliffside Park, New Jersey

Head coach

Charlie Gelbert

Assistant coach(es)

Legend

- (C) Team captain
- (S) Suspended
- (I) Ineligible
- Injured
- Current redshirt

== Schedule ==
1953 Lafayette Leopards baseball game log
Regular season
April (7–2–2)

#	Date	Opponent	Site/stadium	Score	Overall record
1	April 2	at Georgetown	Unknown • Washington, D.C.	2–1	1–0
2	April 3	vs Fort Eustis	Unknown • Virginia Beach, Virginia	9–10	1–1
3	April 4	vs Navy	Unknown • Virginia Beach, Virginia	1–2	1–2
4	April 7	at La Salle	Unknown • Philadelphia, Pennsylvania	4–4	1–2–1
5	April 11	NYU	Fisher Field • Easton, Pennsylvania	3–2	2–2–1
6	April 14	at Moravian	Unknown • Bethlehem, Pennsylvania	6–3	3–2–1
7	April 17	Penn State	Fisher Field • Easton, Pennsylvania	2–2	3–2–2
8	April 22	at Muhlenberg	Unknown • Allentown, Pennsylvania	5–2	4–2–2
9	April 25	Bucknell	Fisher Field • Easton, Pennsylvania	8–3	5–2–2
10	April 28	at Albright	Unknown • Reading, Pennsylvania	11–1	6–2–2
11	April 30	at Temple	Erny Field • Philadelphia, Pennsylvania	11–7	7–2–2

May (7–1–1)

#	Date	Opponent	Site/stadium	Score	Overall record
12	May 6	Muhlenberg	Fisher Field • Easton, Pennsylvania	11–0	8–2–2
13	May 8	Delaware	Fisher Field • Easton, Pennsylvania	8–0	9–2–2
14	May 9	at Lehigh	Taylor Stadium • Bethlehem, Pennsylvania	3–3	9–2–3
15	May 12	at Gettysburg	Unknown • Gettysburg, Pennsylvania	14–3	10–2–3
16	May 14	Scranton	Fisher Field • Easton, Pennsylvania	7–0	11–2–3
17	May 16	at Rutgers	Bainton Field • Piscataway, New Jersey	4–0	12–2–3
18	May 20	Swarthmore	Fisher Field • Easton, Pennsylvania	11–0	13–2–3
19	May 22	Penn	Fisher Field • Easton, Pennsylvania	13–3	14–2–3
20	May 23	Lehigh	Fisher Field • Easton, Pennsylvania	1–2	14–3–3

Postseason
District II Playoff (2–0)

#	Date	Opponent	Site/stadium	Score	Overall record
21	June 3	Pittsburgh	Fisher Field • Easton, Pennsylvania	6–1	15–3–3
22	June 4	Penn State	Fisher Field • Easton, Pennsylvania	5–3	16–3–3

June (1–0)

#	Date	Opponent	Site/stadium	Score	Overall record
23	June 6	Lehigh	Fisher Field • Easton, Pennsylvania	8–3	17–3–3

College World Series (3–2)

#	Date	Opponent	Site/stadium	Score	Overall record
24	June 11	vs Colorado State	Omaha Municipal Stadium • Omaha, Nebraska	6–2	18–3–3
25	June 12	vs Texas	Omaha Municipal Stadium • Omaha, Nebraska	2–7	18–4–3
26	June 13	vs Stanford	Omaha Municipal Stadium • Omaha, Nebraska	4–3	19–4–3
27	June 14	vs Boston College	Omaha Municipal Stadium • Omaha, Nebraska	2–1	20–4–3
28	June 15	vs Texas	Omaha Municipal Stadium • Omaha, Nebraska	3–4	20–5–3
