= Bob Clatterbuck =

American football player (1932–2004)

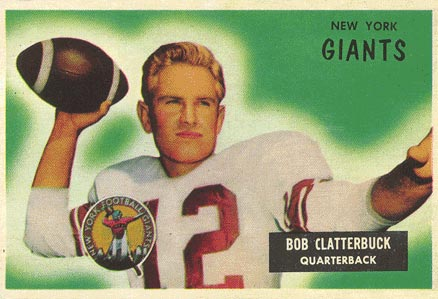
- Clatterbuck on a 1955 Bowman football card

No. 12, 19
- Position: Quarterback

Personal information
- Born: July 3, 1932; Columbia, Missouri, U.S.
- Died: November 7, 2004 (aged 72); Hurricane, Utah, U.S.
- Listed height: 6 ft 3 in (1.91 m)
- Listed weight: 195 lb (88 kg)

Career information
- High school: San Angelo (TX)
- College: San Angelo (1950); Houston (1951–1953)
- NFL draft: 1954: 27th round, 316th overall pick

Career history
- New York Giants (1954–1957); Houston Oilers (1960)*; Los Angeles Chargers (1960)
- * Offseason or practice squad member only

Awards and highlights
- NFL champion (1956)

Career NFL statistics
- Passing attempts: 149
- Passing completions: 77
- Completion percentage: 51.7%
- TD–INT: 8–9
- Passing yards: 1,032
- Passer rating: 66.7
- Stats at Pro Football Reference

Robert Dean Clatterbuck (July 3, 1932 – November 7, 2004) was a National Football League (NFL) and American Football League (AFL) quarterback. He played for the New York Giants and the Los Angeles Chargers.

== Amateur career ==
Clatterbuck attended San Angelo High School. He went on to play for the local San Angelo College. In 1950, his one year there, Clatterbuck led the Rams to a conference championship and a victory in the Oleander Bowl. Afterwards, he played college football for Houston for 3 years. He held most of the passing records when he left. He was a member of the school's first bowl appearance, winning the 1952 Salad Bowl. While at Houston, Clatterbuck also played baseball as a pitcher, and participated in the 1953 College World Series for the Cougars. In 2014, he was posthumously inducted into his high school athletic hall of fame.

== Professional career ==
After college, Clatterbuck was drafted 316th overall into the NFL in the 27th round by the New York Giants. He beat out two All-Americans for the job to back up All-Pro quarterback Charlie Conerly. He rarely saw playing time, starting just 2 games in 4 seasons with the team. He was a member of the 1956 championship team. In 1960, Clatterbuck joined the AFL, playing for the Chargers in their inaugural season. He started two games in relief of starter Jack Kemp.

Clatterbuck wore contact lenses while he played. During a game early in his career, the backup was required to enter game, where he realized he had forgotten his contacts and played out the half "throwing blind".
