= 1956 Arizona Wildcats baseball team =

American university baseball season

1956 Arizona Wildcats baseball

Border champion District 6 champion

College World Series, 2nd
- Conference: Border Conference
- Record: 49–8 (4–0 Border)
- Head coach: Frank Sancet (7th season)
- Home stadium: UA Field

The 1956 Arizona Wildcats baseball team represented the University of Arizona in the 1956 NCAA baseball season. The Wildcats played their home games at UA Field and Hi Corbett Field in Tucson, Arizona. The team was coached by Frank Sancet in his seventh season at Arizona.

The Wildcats reached the College World Series, finishing as the runner up to Minnesota.

== Roster ==
1956 Arizona Wildcats roster
| - James M. Bright Jr.; - Wess P. Chambers; - Thomas A. Clarkson; - Jack K. Davis; - Glen R. Festin; - Albert H. Hovagiar; - Donald S. Hyman; - Donald McGinnis | - Harry J. Messick; - Jack Morgan; - Richard F. Nixon; - Hadie Reed; - Orton Craig Sorenson; - Thomas A. Tellez; - Tom Tomooka | Pitchers: - Don Lee; - Ernest Oosterveen; - Carl Thomas; Infielders Catchers Outfielders: - Homer Lee Myers |

== Schedule ==
Legend
| Arizona win |
| Arizona loss |

1956 Arizona Wildcats baseball game log
Regular season

March
| Date | Opponent | Site/stadium | Score | Overall record |
|---|---|---|---|---|
| Mar 5 | Sul Ross | Tucson, AZ | W 3–2 | 1–0 |
| Mar 6 | Sul Ross | Tucson, AZ | W 8–1 | 2–0 |
| Mar 8 | Camp Pendleton Marines | Tucson, AZ | W 10–2 | 3–0 |
| Mar 9 | Camp Pendleton Marines | Tucson, AZ | W 18–6 | 4–0 |
| Mar 11 | Naval Training Center San Diego | Tucson, AZ | W 16–0 | 5–0 |
| Mar 12 | Naval Training Center San Diego | Tucson, AZ | W 11–7 | 6–0 |
| Mar 16 | Pepperdine | Tucson, AZ | W 21–2 | 7–0 |
| Mar 17 | Pepperdine | Tucson, AZ | W 9–1 | 8–0 |
| Mar 19 | Utah | Tucson, AZ | W 18–8 | 9–0 |
| Mar 20 | Utah | Tucson, AZ | W 8–2 | 10–0 |
| Mar 21 | Utah | Tucson, AZ | W 10–2 | 11–0 |
| Mar 22 | Utah | Tucson, AZ | W 5–0 | 12–0 |
| Mar 23 | Utah | Tucson, AZ | W 14–2 | 13–0 |
| Mar 23 | Utah | Tucson, AZ | W 14–1 | 14–0 |
| Mar 24 | Utah State | Tucson, AZ | W 16–5 | 15–0 |
| Mar 26 | Iowa | Tucson, AZ | W 13–7 | 16–0 |
| Mar 27 | Iowa | Tucson, AZ | W 20–0 | 17–0 |
| Mar 28 | Iowa | Tucson, AZ | W 8–7 | 18–0 |
| Mar 29 | Iowa | Tucson, AZ | W 5–3 | 19–0 |
| Mar 30 | Iowa | Tucson, AZ | W 4–2 | 20–0 |
| Mar 31 | Iowa | Tucson, AZ | W 5–2 | 21–0 |

April
| Date | Opponent | Site/stadium | Score | Overall record |
|---|---|---|---|---|
| Apr 2 | at Pepperdine | Malibu, CA | W 8–5 | 22–0 |
| Apr 3 | at UCLA | Joe E. Brown Field • Los Angeles, CA | W 4–3 | 23–0 |
| Apr 4 | at Fresno State | Fresno, CA | W 10–4 | 24–0 |
| Apr 6 | at Camp Pendleton Marines | San Diego County, CA | W 9–4 | 25–0 |
| Apr 7 | at Naval Training Center San Diego | San Diego, CA | L 3–7 | 25–1 |
| Apr 9 | Wyoming | Tucson, AZ | W 10–5 | 26–1 |
| Apr 10 | Wyoming | Tucson, AZ | W 15–4 | 27–1 |
| Apr 11 | Wyoming | Tucson, AZ | W 17–2 | 28–1 |
| Apr 13 | San Diego State | Hi Corbett Field • Tucson, AZ | W 5–2 | 29–1 |
| Apr 14 | San Diego State | Tucson, AZ | L 5–7 | 29–2 |
| Apr 16 | Fort Bliss | Tucson, AZ | L 2–5 | 29–3 |
| Apr 17 | Fort Bliss | Tucson, AZ | W 15–3 | 30–3 |
| Apr 18 | Fort Bliss | Tucson, AZ | L 2–8 | 30–4 |
| Apr 19 | NAS San Diego | Tucson, AZ | L 5–7 | 30–5 |
| Apr 20 | NAS San Diego | Tucson, AZ | W 4–0 | 31–5 |
| Apr 21 | at Arizona State | Tempe, AZ | W 4–1 (Note: No-hitter, by Carl Thomas.) | 32–5 |
| Apr 21 | at Arizona State | Tempe, AZ | W 7–0 | 33–5 |
| Apr 23 | White Sands Missile Range | Tucson, AZ | W 9–4 | 34–5 |
| Apr 24 | White Sands Missile Range | Tucson, AZ | W 9–7 | 35–5 |
| Apr 25 | White Sands Missile Range | Tucson, AZ | W 10–1 | 36–5 |
| Apr 27 | UCLA | Tucson, AZ | W 10–0 (Note: No-hitter, by Carl Thomas.) | 37–5 |
| Apr 28 | UCLA | Tucson, AZ | W 10–0 | 38–5 |

May
| Date | Opponent | Site/stadium | Score | Overall record |
|---|---|---|---|---|
| May 1 | Davis-Monthan AFB | Tucson, AZ | W 12–11 | 39–5 |
| May 3 | Davis-Monthan AFB | Tucson, AZ | W 20–7 | 40–5 |
| May 5 | Arizona State | Tucson, AZ | W 10–3 | 41–5 |
| May 5 | Arizona State | Tucson, AZ | W 6–0 | 42–5 |
| May 8 | Davis-Monthan AFB | Tucson, AZ | L 0–4 | 42–6 |
| May 8 | Davis-Monthan AFB | Tucson, AZ | W 18–5 | 43–6 |

Postseason

NCAA District 6 Playoff
| Date | Opponent | Site/stadium | Score | Attendance | Overall record | NCAAT record |
|---|---|---|---|---|---|---|
| May 21 | TCU | Hi Corbett Field • Tucson, AZ | W 7–5 | 4,635 | 44–6 | 1–0 |
| May 22 | TCU | Hi Corbett Field • Tucson, AZ | W 8–2 | | 45–6 | 2–0 |

College World Series
| Date | Opponent | Site/stadium | Score | Overall record | CWS record |
|---|---|---|---|---|---|
| June 9 | NYU | Johnny Rosenblatt Stadium • Omaha, NE | W 3–0 | 46–6 | 1–0 |
| June 10 | Minnesota | Johnny Rosenblatt Stadium • Omaha, NE | L 1–3 | 46–7 | 1–1 |
| June 11 | New Hampshire | Johnny Rosenblatt Stadium • Omaha, NE | W 1–0 | 47–7 | 2–1 |
| June 12 | Ole Miss | Johnny Rosenblatt Stadium • Omaha, NE | W 7–3 | 48–7 | 3–1 |
| June 13 | Minnesota | Johnny Rosenblatt Stadium • Omaha, NE | W 10–4 | 49–7 | 4–1 |
| June 14 | Minnesota | Johnny Rosenblatt Stadium • Omaha, NE | L 1–12 | 49–8 | 4–2 |
