= 1956 Wyoming Cowboys baseball team =

American college baseball season

1956 Wyoming Cowboys baseball

Skyline Eastern Division champion Skyline Tournament champion District VII champion

College World Series, T-5th
- Conference: Skyline Conference
- Eastern
- Record: 18–15 (7–2 Skyline)
- Head coach: Bud Daniel (6th season)
- Home stadium: Cowboy Field

The 1956 Wyoming Cowboys baseball team represented the University of Wyoming in the 1956 NCAA baseball season. The Cowboys played their home games at Cowboy Field. The team was coached by Bud Daniel in his 6th year as head coach at Wyoming.

The Cowboys won the District VII playoff to advance to the College World Series, where they were eliminated by the Bradley Braves.

== Roster ==
1956 Wyoming Cowboys baseball team
Players
Coaches

#	Pos.	Name	B/T	Height	Weight	Year	Home town
	P	Lee Boyer	/	—	—	Fr
	P	Mort Drury	/	—	—	So
	C	Bob Fisher	/	—	—	So
	INF	Frank Goodie	/	—	—	Jr
	C	Dave Gossen	/	—	—	So
	RHP	Bob Hall	/R	—	—	So
	INF	Fritz Heiss	/	—	—	Sr
	INF	Jim Hoppe	/	—	—	So
	RHP	Jim Houston	/R	—	—	Jr
		Peter Kutches	/	—	—	Sr
	OF	Vic McElroy	/	—	—	Sr
	P	Meeboer	/	—	—
	INF	Gerry Nagle	/	—	—	Sr
		Don Napierkodski	/	—	—	Sr
	P	Nelson	/	—	—	So
	OF	Bob Sullivan	/	—	—	Sr
	RHP	Ralph Vaughn	/R	—	—	Sr
	RHP	Robert Villasenor	/R	—	—	Sr	Los Angeles, California

Head coach

Bud Daniel

Assistant coach(es)

Legend

- (C) Team captain
- (S) Suspended
- (I) Ineligible
- Injured
- Current redshirt

== Schedule ==
1956 Wyoming Cowboys baseball game log
Regular season
April (8–10)

#	Date	Opponent	Site/stadium	Score	Overall record	Skyline record
1	April 3	at Kirtland Air Force Base	Unknown • Albuquerque, New Mexico	2–1	1–0	–
2	April 4	at New Mexico	Lobo Field • Albuquerque, New Mexico	6–3	2–0	1–0
3	April 4	at New Mexico	Lobo Field • Albuquerque, New Mexico	10–5	3–0	2–0
4	April 5	at Arizona State	Unknown • Tempe, Arizona	–	–	2–0
5	April 5	at Arizona State	Unknown • Tempe, Arizona	–	–	2–0
6	April 5	at Arizona State	Unknown • Tempe, Arizona	–	–	2–0
7	April 9	at Arizona	UA Field • Tucson, Arizona	5–10	4–3	2–0
8	April 10	at Arizona	UA Field • Tucson, Arizona	4–15	4–4	2–0
9	April 11	at Arizona	UA Field • Tucson, Arizona	2–17	4–5	2–0
10	April 14	at Denver	Unknown • Denver, Colorado	–	–	–
11	April 15	at Denver	Unknown • Denver, Colorado	–	–	3–1
12	April 16	Colorado	Unknown • Unknown	–	5–7	3–1
13	April 17	Colorado	Unknown • Unknown	2–12	5–8	3–1
14	April 20	at Colorado State	Jackson Field • Greeley, Colorado	5–6	5–9	3–1
15	April 21	Colorado State	Cowboy Field • Laramie, Wyoming	5–3	6–9	3–1
16	April 21	Colorado	Cowboy Field • Laramie, Wyoming	10–17	6–10	3–1
17	April 27	at Colorado A&M	Unknown • Fort Collins, Colorado	13–2	7–10	4–1
18	April 27	at Francis E. Warren Air Force Base	Unknown • Cheyenne, Wyoming	9–3	8–10	4–1

May (5–1)

#	Date	Opponent	Site/stadium	Score	Overall record	Skyline record
19	May 1	Francis E. Warren Air Force Base	Cowboy Field • Laramie, Wyoming	12–8	9–10	4–1
20	May 4	Denver	Cowboy Field • Laramie, Wyoming	15–6	10–10	5–1
21	May 5	Denver	Cowboy Field • Laramie, Wyoming	8–5	11–10	6–1
22	May 8	Lowry Air Force Base	Cowboy Field • Laramie, Wyoming	10–2	12–10	6–1
23	May 11	New Mexico	Cowboy Field • Laramie, Wyoming	5–8	12–11	6–2
24	May 12	New Mexico	Cowboy Field • Laramie, Wyoming	16–9	13–11	7–2

Postseason
Skyline Conference Championship (2–1)

#	Date	Opponent	Site/stadium	Score	Overall record	Skyline record
25	May 25	at Utah	Derks Field • Salt Lake City, Utah	8–5	14–11	7–2
26	May 26	at Utah	Derks Field • Salt Lake City, Utah	3–8	14–12	7–2
27	May 26	at Utah	Derks Field • Salt Lake City, Utah	9–7	15–12	7–2

NCAA District VII Playoff (2–1)

#	Date	Opponent	Site/stadium	Score	Overall record	Skyline record
28	June 1	vs Colorado State	Jackson Field • Greeley, Colorado	8–5	16–12	7–2
29	June 1	vs Colorado State	Jackson Field • Greeley, Colorado	3–8	16–13	7–2
30	June 2	vs Colorado State	Jackson Field • Greeley, Colorado	9–7	17–13	7–2

College World Series (1–2)

#	Date	Opponent	Site/stadium	Score	Overall record	Skyline record
31	June 9	vs Minnesota	Omaha Municipal Stadium • Omaha, Nebraska	0–4	17–14	7–2
32	June 10	vs NYU	Omaha Municipal Stadium • Omaha, Nebraska	8–2	18–14	7–2
33	June 11	vs Bradley	Omaha Municipal Stadium • Omaha, Nebraska	12–8	18–15	7–2
