= 1953 Michigan Wolverines baseball team =

American college baseball season

1953 Michigan Wolverines baseball

National champions Big Ten Conference champions
- Conference: Big Ten Conference
- Record: 21-9 (10-3 Big Ten)
- Head coach: Ray Fisher (33rd year)
- Home stadium: Ferry Field

1953 Big Ten Conference baseball standings
	Conf.				Overall
Team	W		L	PCT	W		L	PCT
Illinois ‍†‍‍	10	–	3	.769	17	–	6	.739
Michigan ‍†‍‍^{y}	10	–	3	.769	21	–	9	.700
Ohio State ‍‍‍	9	–	4	.692	13	–	13	.500
Iowa ‍‍‍	8	–	4	.667	15	–	10	.600
Minnesota ‍‍‍	7	–	5	.583	19	–	9	.679
Wisconsin ‍‍‍	6	–	5	.545	19	–	8	.704
Michigan State ‍‍‍	6	–	7	.462	11	–	17	.393
Northwestern ‍‍‍	2	–	9	.182	12	–	12	.500
Purdue ‍‍‍	2	–	9	.182	5	–	13	.278
Indiana ‍‍‍	0	–	11	.000	9	–	4	.692
† – Conference champion y – Invited to the College World Series; As of June 30, 1953; Rankings from Collegiate Baseball

The 1953 Michigan Wolverines baseball team represented the University of Michigan in the 1953 NCAA baseball season. The Wolverines played their home games at Ferry Field. The team was coached by Ray Fisher in his 33rd season at Michigan.

The Wolverines won the 1953 College World Series, defeating the Texas Longhorns in the championship game.

== Roster ==
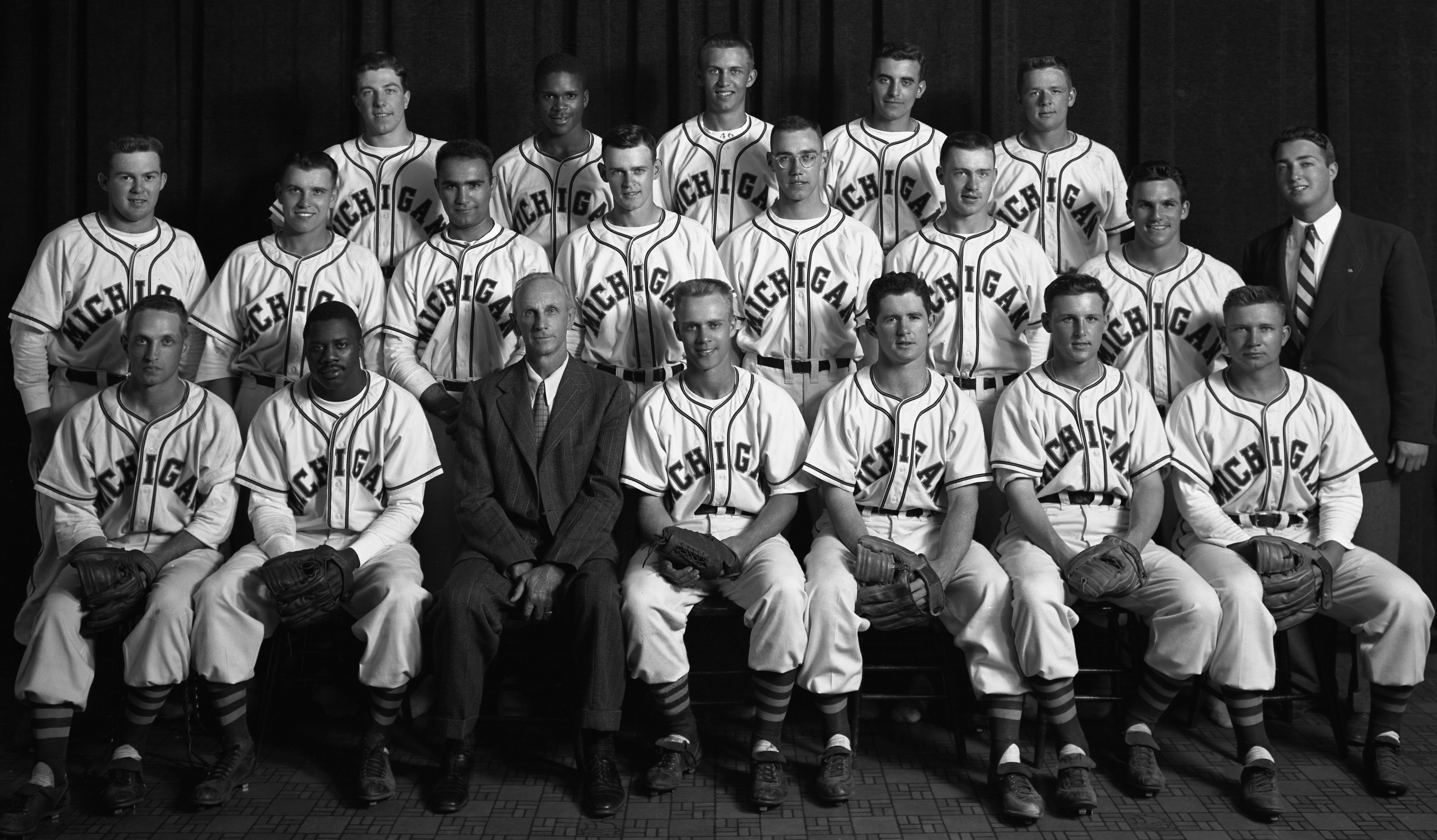

Back row: Daniel Cline, Don Eaddy, Marvin Wisnewski, Ray Pavichevich, Paul Lepley
Middle row: Jack Ritter, Richard Leach, Garabed Tadian, Paul Fancher, Robert Woschitz, Jack Corbett, Richard Yirkosky, Robert Margolin (manager)
Front row: Bruce Haynam, Frank Howell, Ray Fisher (coach), Bill Mogk (captain), Gerald Harrington, Gil Sabuco, Bill Billings

== Schedule ==
1953 Michigan Wolverines baseball game log
Regular season

April
Date	Opponent	Score	Overall record	Big Ten record
April 3	Delaware	6–3	1–0	–
April 4	Georgetown	14–1	2–0	–
April 5	Marine Corps Base Quantico	3–4	2–1	–
April 6	George Washington	6-2	3-1	–
April 8	Marine Corps Base Quantico	12–16	3–2	–
April 11	Virginia	3–4	3–3	–
April 17	Western Michigan	1–5	3–4	–
April 18	Western Michigan	5–4	4–4	–
April 24	Ohio State	19–9	5–4	1–0
April 25	Illinois	6–1	6–4	2–0
April 25	Illinois	3–2	7–4	3–0
April 28	Detroit	5–6	7–5	–

May
Date	Opponent	Score	Overall record	Big Ten record
May 1	Minnesota	10–6	8–5	4–0
May 2	Iowa	2–4	8–6	4–1
May 2	Iowa	3–5	8–7	4–2
May 8	Michigan State	9–1	9–7	5–2
May 9	Michigan State	5–6	9–8	5–3
May 9	Michigan State	20–2	10–8	6–3
May 14	Notre Dame	3–2	11–8	–
May 15	at Purdue	2–1	12–8	7–3
May 22	Wisconsin	7–2	13–8	8–3
May 23	Northwestern	3–2	14–8	9–3
May 23	Northwestern	5-3	15-8	10-3

Postseason

NCAA District Tournament
Date	Opponent	Score	Overall record	NCAA District Record
May 29	vs. Ohio	6–5	16–8	1–0
May 30	vs. Ohio	7–0	17–8	2–0

College World Series
Date	Opponent	Site/stadium	Score	Overall record	CWS Record
June 11	vs. Stanford	Rosenblatt Stadium	4–0	18–8	1–0
June 12	vs. Boston College	Rosenblatt Stadium	6–2	19–8	2–0
June 13	vs. Texas	Rosenblatt Stadium	12–5	20–8	3–0
June 14	vs. Texas	Rosenblatt Stadium	4–6	20–9	3–1
June 16	vs. Texas	Rosenblatt Stadium	7–5	21–9	4–1

== Awards and honors ==
Don Eaddy

- All-Big Ten First Team

Bruce Haynam

- All-America First Team
- All-Big Ten First Team

Paul Lepley

- All-American Third Team
