= Hank Swasey =

American college sports coach (1893–1980)

Biographical details
- Born: April 25, 1893; South Berwick, Maine, U.S.
- Died: June 1, 1980 (aged 87); Biddeford, Maine, U.S.

Playing career

Baseball
- 1912–1915: Amherst

Football
- 1912–1914: Amherst
- Positions: Center fielder, Left end

Coaching career (HC unless noted)

Baseball
- 1922–1962: New Hampshire

Soccer
- 1924–1927: New Hampshire

Ice hockey
- 1924–1925: New Hampshire

Head coaching record
- Overall: 248–273–1 (baseball); 9–9–2 (soccer); 2–2–0 (ice hockey)
- Tournaments: 1–2

Henry Cleveland Swasey (April 25, 1893 – June 1, 1980) was an American athlete and coach. He played both baseball and football at Amherst College and coached at the University of New Hampshire for 41 years. he was inducted into the American Baseball Coaches Association Hall of Fame in 1968.

== Career ==
Born and raised in South Berwick, Maine, Hank Swasey graduated from Berwick Academy in 1911. That fall he began attending Amherst College and joined the school's baseball team as a freshman. At the beginning of his sophomore year he also joined the football team, eventually become the starting left end. During his senior season, he was captain of the baseball team, graduating in the spring of 1915.

After earning a degree in physical education, Swasey remained at school for a year on a fellowship before becoming an instructor at Fessenden School. After a year on the job, he left for a similar position at Adelphia Academy in Brooklyn. He remained in that position for onie year before returning to the college ranks as an instructor at Worcester Polytechnic Institute.

In 1921, he was hired by the New Hampshire College as an assistant professor of physical education as well as the school's head baseball coach. Early on, Swasey was also in charge of intramural athletics and in that capacity he founded two new varsity programs for the school. In 1924, the newly renamed University of New Hampshire began sponsoring men's soccer Swasey would helm the nascent program for four year before it was shuttered and didn't return to varsity status until the mid-1960s. Later in 1924, The school also founded an ice hockey program. While that club remained active afterwards, Swasey would only helm the hockey team for its inaugural year.

Baseball, however, was Swasey calling and he led the program for 41 years, pausing only briefly due to World War II. In 1956, Swasey led the Wildcats to the College World Series, the first of two appearances in program history. He retired as an associate professor in 1962 and was inducted into the ABCA Hall of fame a few years later.

== Head coaching record ==
=== Baseball ===
Record table
Season	Team	Overall	Conference	Standing	Postseason
New Hampshire Bulls Independent (1922–1925)
1922	New Hampshire	3–12			
1923	New Hampshire	8–4			
1924	New Hampshire	9–5			
1925	New Hampshire	6–8–1			
New Hampshire Wildcats Independent (1926–1943)
1926	New Hampshire	9–5			
1927	New Hampshire	7–8			
1928	New Hampshire	11–8			
1929	New Hampshire	6–9			
1930	New Hampshire	7–6–1			
1931	New Hampshire	7–5			
1932	New Hampshire	6–7–1			
1933	New Hampshire	3–8–1			
1934	New Hampshire	3–7			
1935	New Hampshire	5–4–2			
1936	New Hampshire	13–1			
1937	New Hampshire	4–12			
1938	New Hampshire	3–9			
1939	New Hampshire	8–6			
1940	New Hampshire	7–2–1			
1941	New Hampshire	7–4			
1942	New Hampshire	5–5			
1943	New Hampshire	8–1			
New Hampshire:		144–136–7			
New Hampshire Wildcats (Yankee Conference) (1926–1943)
1946	New Hampshire	8–0			
1947	New Hampshire	4–7			
1948	New Hampshire	8–4–1			
1949	New Hampshire	3–9			
1950	New Hampshire	4–10			
1951	New Hampshire	7–7			
1952	New Hampshire	6–11			
1953	New Hampshire	6–8			
1954	New Hampshire	10–3			
1955	New Hampshire	11–5			
1956	New Hampshire	13–7			CWS Lower round 2
1957	New Hampshire	6–10			
1958	New Hampshire	2–14			
1959	New Hampshire	7–11			
1960	New Hampshire	4–11			
1961	New Hampshire	3–8			
1962	New Hampshire	2–12			
New Hampshire:		104–137–1			
Total:		248–273–1			
National champion Postseason invitational champion Conference regular season champion Conference regular season and conference tournament champion Division regular season champion Division regular season and conference tournament champion Conference tournament champion

=== Soccer ===
Record table
Season	Team	Overall	Conference	Standing	Postseason
New Hampshire Bulls Independent (1924–1925)
1924	New Hampshire	2–0–1			
1925	New Hampshire	2–4–0			
New Hampshire Wildcats Independent (1926–1927)
1926	New Hampshire	2–2–1			
1927	New Hampshire	3–3–0			
New Hampshire:		9–9–2			
Total:		9–9–2			
National champion Postseason invitational champion Conference regular season champion Conference regular season and conference tournament champion Division regular season champion Division regular season and conference tournament champion Conference tournament champion

=== Ice hockey ===
Record table
Season	Team	Overall	Conference	Standing	Postseason
New Hampshire Bulls Independent (1924–1925)
1924–25	New Hampshire	2–2–0			
New Hampshire:		2–2–0			
Total:		2–2–0			
National champion Postseason invitational champion Conference regular season champion Conference regular season and conference tournament champion Division regular season champion Division regular season and conference tournament champion Conference tournament champion
