= Jack Shepard (baseball) =

American baseball player (1931–1994)

- Catcher
- Born: May 13, 1931; Clovis, California, U.S.
- Died: December 31, 1994 (aged 63); Atherton, California, U.S.
- Batted: Right Threw: Right

MLB debut
- June 19, 1953, for the Pittsburgh Pirates

Last MLB appearance
- September 30, 1956, for the Pittsburgh Pirates

MLB statistics
- Batting average: .260
- Home runs: 12
- Runs batted in: 75
- Stats at Baseball Reference

Teams
- Pittsburgh Pirates (1953–1956)

Jack Leroy Shepard (May 13, 1931 – December 31, 1994) was an American professional baseball player, a catcher, who became a successful businessman and philanthropist after retiring from baseball at age 25 following three full seasons in the Major Leagues.

A native of Clovis, California, the 6 ft 2 in (1.88 m), 195 lb (88 kg) Shepard attended Stanford University, graduating in 1953 after serving as the captain of the first Cardinal team (then nicknamed the Indians) to play in the College World Series. He signed with the Pittsburgh Pirates upon graduation on June 16 and made his Major League debut three days later against the St. Louis Cardinals at Sportsman's Park, substituting for starting catcher Mike Sandlock and singling in two at bats against Vinegar Bend Mizell. He also made two errors in the field. He spent part of the 1953 season in minor league baseball, playing in 84 games for the Denver Bears of the Class A Western League and batting .324, before returning to the Pirates for good from 1954–1956.

The Pirates of the mid-1950s were at one of the low ebbs of their history. Shepard's 1954–1956 clubs averaged 94 losses (against only 60 wins) per season. Despite their struggles, and his first-game jitters in 1953, Shepard gained a reputation as a stalwart defensive player, batted .304 in his first full season (when he was named Pirates' rookie of the year and selected to The Sporting News' all-rookie team) and became one of the team leaders. His 1956 manager, Bobby Bragan, said of him, "Shepard was the most intelligent catcher I've known. He handled pitchers well and could throw. He was good on plays at the plate. Fearless."

But Shepard's off-seasons were spent continuing his education at Stanford, where he obtained master's degrees in business and education. After serving as Pittsburgh's regular catcher in 1956, appearing in a career-high 100 games, he announced his retirement to become development director at his alma mater and begin a full-time career in business. All told, he played in 278 MLB games, and collected 195 hits.

He served as president and chief executive of a San Francisco-area telecommunications firm and a baseball equipment and indoor baseball and entertainment center company, and was a management consultant as well as a philanthropist on behalf of multiple Palo Alto, California-area institutions. He was a member of the Stanford and Fresno County athletic halls of fame.

Jack Shepard died at age 63 from cancer in Atherton, California.
