= 1953 NCAA baseball season =

Baseball season

College World Series
- Champions: Michigan (1st title)
- Runners-up: Texas (4th CWS Appearance)
- Winning coach: Ray Fisher (1st title)
- MOP: J. L. Smith (Texas)

Seasons
- ← 1952 1954 →

The 1953 NCAA baseball season, play of college baseball in the United States organized by the National Collegiate Athletic Association (NCAA) began in the spring of 1953. The season progressed through the regular season and concluded with the 1953 College World Series. The College World Series, held for the seventh time in 1953, consisted of one team from each of eight geographical districts and was held in Omaha, Nebraska at Johnny Rosenblatt Stadium as a double-elimination tournament. Michigan claimed the championship.

== Conference winners ==
This is a partial list of conference champions from the 1953 season. Each of the eight geographical districts chose, by various methods, the team that would represent them in the NCAA Tournament. Conference champions had to be chosen, unless all conference champions declined the bid.

Conference	Regular season winner	Conference tournament	Tournament city	Tournament winner
Big Seven Conference	Oklahoma	No tournament		
Big Ten Conference	Michigan; Illinois	No tournament		
CIBA	Stanford	No tournament		
EIBL	Princeton	No conference tournament		
Mid-American Conference	Ohio	No tournament		
Missouri Valley Conference	Houston	No tournament		
Pacific Coast Conference	Oregon	No tournament		
Rocky Mountain Conference	Colorado State	No tournament		
Southeastern Conference	Georgia	No tournament		
Southern Conference	North - George Washington; South - North Carolina	1953 Southern Conference baseball tournament	Greensboro, NC	Duke
Southwest Conference	Texas	No tournament		
Yankee Conference	Connecticut	No tournament		

== Conference standings ==
The following is an incomplete list of conference standings:

1953 Big Seven Conference baseball standings
	Conf.				Overall
Team	W		L	PCT	W		L	PCT
Oklahoma ‍†‍‍^{y}	7	–	2	.778	11	–	11	.500
Nebraska ‍‍‍	10	–	3	.769	13	–	5	.722
Missouri ‍‍‍	9	–	5	.643	11	–	8	.579
Colorado ‍‍‍	4	–	4	.500		–		–
Iowa State ‍‍‍	4	–	5	.444		–		–
Kansas ‍‍‍	4	–	8	.333	6	–	10	.375
Kansas State ‍‍‍	1	–	12	.077	4	–	13	.235
† – Conference champion y – Invited to the College World Series; As of June 30, 1953; Rankings from Collegiate Baseball

1953 Big Ten Conference baseball standings
	Conf.				Overall
Team	W		L	PCT	W		L	PCT
Illinois ‍†‍‍	10	–	3	.769	17	–	6	.739
Michigan ‍†‍‍^{y}	10	–	3	.769	21	–	9	.700
Ohio State ‍‍‍	9	–	4	.692	13	–	13	.500
Iowa ‍‍‍	8	–	4	.667	15	–	10	.600
Minnesota ‍‍‍	7	–	5	.583	19	–	9	.679
Wisconsin ‍‍‍	6	–	5	.545	19	–	8	.704
Michigan State ‍‍‍	6	–	7	.462	11	–	17	.393
Northwestern ‍‍‍	2	–	9	.182	12	–	12	.500
Purdue ‍‍‍	2	–	9	.182	5	–	13	.278
Indiana ‍‍‍	0	–	11	.000	9	–	4	.692
† – Conference champion y – Invited to the College World Series; As of June 30, 1953; Rankings from Collegiate Baseball

1953 Eastern Intercollegiate Baseball League baseball standings
	Conf.						Overall
Team	W		L		T	PCT	W		L		T	PCT
Princeton ‍†‍‍	8	–	2	–	1	.773	14	–	7	–	1	.659
Yale ‍‍‍	6	–	3	–	1	.650	16	–	8	–	2	.654
Penn ‍‍‍	6	–	3	–	1	.650	10	–	11	–	1	.477
Dartmouth ‍‍‍	5	–	3	–	0	.625	11	–	14	–	0	.440
Brown ‍‍‍	4	–	3	–	2	.556	6	–	6	–	2	.500
Columbia ‍‍‍	4	–	5	–	0	.444	7	–	8	–	2	.471
Harvard ‍‍‍	4	–	5	–	0	.444	8	–	11	–	0	.421
Cornell ‍‍‍	3	–	6	–	0	.333	7	–	6	–	0	.538
Army ‍‍‍	2	–	5	–	1	.313	6	–	9	–	3	.417
Navy ‍‍‍	1	–	8	–	0	.111	10	–	10	–	0	.500
† – Conference champion

1953 Missouri Valley Conference baseball standings
	Conf.				Overall
Team	W		L	PCT	W		L	PCT
Houston ‍†‍‍^{y}	6	–	2	.750	15	–	11	.577
Oklahoma A&M ‍‍‍	4	–	2	.667	13	–	4	.765
Tulsa ‍‍‍	4	–	2	.667	11	–	6	.647
Detroit ‍‍‍	2	–	1	.667	11	–	7	.611
Saint Louis ‍‍‍	1	–	2	.333		–		–
Wichita State ‍‍‍	0	–	6	.000		–		–
† – Conference champion y – Invited to the College World Series; As of June 30, 1951; Rankings from Coaches' Poll

1953 Pacific Coast Conference baseball standings
	Conf.						Overall
Team	W		L		T	PCT	W		L		T	PCT
North Division
Oregon ‍†‍‍	9	–	3	–	0	.750	15	–	4	–	0	.789
Oregon State ‍‍‍	8	–	3	–	0	.727	15	–	9	–	0	.625
Washington State ‍‍‍	8	–	8	–	0	.500	14	–	14	–	1	.500
Idaho ‍‍‍	6	–	7	–	0	.462	0	–	0	–	0	–
Washington ‍‍‍	1	–	11	–	0	.083	4	–	15	–	1	.225
California Intercollegiate Baseball Association
Stanford ‍†‍‍^{y}	10	–	6	–	0	.625	29	–	5	–	2	.833
USC ‍‍‍	10	–	6	–	0	.625	21	–	9	–	0	.700
California ‍‍‍	8	–	8	–	0	.500	22	–	15	–	0	.595
Santa Clara ‍‍‍	6	–	10	–	0	.375	14	–	15	–	0	.483
UCLA ‍‍‍	6	–	10	–	0	.375	16	–	20	–	0	.444
† – Conference champion y – Invited to the NCAA tournament

1953 Rocky Mountain Conference baseball standings
	Conf.				Overall
Team	W		L	PCT	W		L	PCT
Colorado State ‍†‍‍^{y}	8	–	1	.889	14	–	7	.667
Colorado College ‍‍‍	4	–	3	.571		–		–
Western State ‍‍‍	2	–	2	.500		–		–
Colorado Mines ‍‍‍	0	–	8	.000	0	–	8	.000
† – Conference champion y – Invited to the College World Series; As of June 30, 1953; Rankings from Collegiate Baseball

1953 Southern Conference baseball standings
	Conf.				Overall
Team	W		L	PCT	W		L	PCT
Northern
George Washington ^{x}‍‍‍	8	–	2	.800		–		–
Maryland ‍‍‍	8	–	2	.800	16	–	7	.696
Richmond ‍‍‍	5	–	5	.500	9	–	9	.500
Virginia Tech ‍‍‍	4	–	5	.444	6	–	7	.462
VMI ‍‍‍	4	–	5	.444		–		–
Washington and Lee ‍‍‍	3	–	6	.333		–		–
West Virginia ‍‍‍	2	–	5	.286		–		–
William & Mary ‍‍‍	2	–	6	.250		–		–
Southern
North Carolina ^{x}‍‍‍	11	–	3	.786	19	–	8	.704
Duke ‍‍‡‍^{y}	9	–	5	.643	22	–	10	.688
Clemson ‍‍‍	10	–	6	.625	11	–	6	.647
Wake Forest ‍‍‍	8	–	5	.615	15	–	5	.750
NC State ‍‍‍	7	–	6	.538		–		–
Furman ‍‍‍	7	–	8	.467		–		–
The Citadel ‍‍‍	7	–	10	.412		–		–
South Carolina ‍‍‍	7	–	11	.389		–		–
Davidson ‍‍‍	0	–	12	.000		–		–
x – Division champion ‡ – Tournament champion y – Invited to the College World Series; As of June 30, 1953; Rankings from Collegiate Baseball

1953 Southwest Conference baseball standings
	Conf.				Overall
Team	W		L	PCT	W		L	PCT
Texas ‍†‍‍^{y}	12	–	3	.800	25	–	7	.781
SMU ‍†‍‍	12	–	3	.800	15	–	6	.714
Baylor ‍‍‍	7	–	5	.583	7	–	5	.583
Texas A&M ‍‍‍	6	–	9	.400	10	–	15	.400
Rice ‍‍‍	3	–	11	.214	7	–	16	.304
TCU ‍‍‍	2	–	11	.154	7	–	15	.318
† – Conference champion y – Invited to the College World Series; As of June 30, 1953; Rankings from Collegiate Baseball

== College World Series ==
The 1953 season marked the seventh NCAA Baseball Tournament, which consisted of the eight team College World Series. The College World Series was held in Omaha, Nebraska. Districts used a variety of selection methods to the event, from playoffs to a selection committee. District playoffs were not considered part of the NCAA Tournament, and the expansion to eight teams resulted in the end of regionals as they existed from 1947 through 1949. The eight teams played a double-elimination format, with Michigan claiming their first championship with a 7–5 win over Texas in the final.

Upper round 1
Texas	2
Duke	1
Lafayette	6
Colorado State College	2
Boston College	4
Houston	1
Michigan	4
Stanford	0

Upper round 2
Texas	7
Lafayette	2
Boston College	3
Michigan	6
Lower round 1
Duke	3
Colorado State College	2
Houston	6
Stanford	7

Upper final
Texas	5
Michigan	12
Lower round 2
Boston College	7^{11}
Duke	6
Lafayette	4
Stanford	3

Semifinals
Michigan	4
Texas	6
Boston College	1
Lafayette	2^{11}

Preliminary final
Texas	13
Lafayette	3

Final
Michigan	7
Texas	5
