= 1956 NCAA baseball season =

Baseball season

NCAA Tournament

College World Series
- Champions: Minnesota (1st title)
- Runners-up: Arizona (3rd CWS Appearance)
- Winning coach: Dick Siebert (1st title)
- MOP: Jerry Thomas (Minnesota)

Seasons
- ← 1955 1957 →

The 1956 NCAA baseball season, play of college baseball in the United States organized by the National Collegiate Athletic Association (NCAA) began in the spring of 1956. The season progressed through the regular season and concluded with the 1956 College World Series. The College World Series, held for the tenth time in 1956, consisted of one team from each of eight geographical districts and was held in Omaha, Nebraska at Johnny Rosenblatt Stadium as a double-elimination tournament. Minnesota claimed the championship.

== Conference winners ==
This is a partial list of conference champions from the 1956 season. Each of the eight geographical districts chose, by various methods, the team that would represent them in the NCAA Tournament. 12 teams earned automatic bids by winning their conference championship while 13 teams earned at-large selections.

Conference	Regular season winner
Atlantic Coast Conference	Duke
Big Seven Conference	Oklahoma
Big Ten Conference	Minnesota
CIBA	Southern California
EIBL	Yale
Mid-American Conference	Ohio
Missouri Valley Conference	Bradley
Pacific Coast Conference	Washington State
Southeastern Conference	Florida
Southern Conference	George Washington
Southwest Conference	TCU
Yankee Conference	New Hampshire

== Conference standings ==
The following is an incomplete list of conference standings:

1956 Big Seven Conference baseball standings
	Conf.				Overall
Team	W		L	PCT	W		L	PCT
Oklahoma ‍†‍‍^{y}	7	–	2	.778	11	–	7	.611
Nebraska ‍‍‍	8	–	4	.667	12	–	8	.600
Kansas ‍‍‍	6	–	5	.545	14	–	5	.737
Missouri ‍‍‍	7	–	6	.538	14	–	7	.667
Iowa State ‍‍‍	6	–	6	.500		–		–
Colorado ‍‍‍	3	–	8	.273		–		–
Kansas State ‍‍‍	3	–	9	.250	5	–	10	.333
† – Conference champion y – Invited to the 1956 NCAA baseball tournament

1956 Big Ten Conference baseball standings
	Conf.						Overall
Team	W		L		T	PCT	W		L		T	PCT
Minnesota ‍†‍‍^{y}	11	–	2	–	0	.846	33	–	9	–	0	.786
Ohio State ‍‍‍	9	–	3	–	0	.750	18	–	7	–	0	.720
Wisconsin ‍‍‍	8	–	4	–	0	.667	20	–	7	–	0	.741
Michigan ‍‍‍	6	–	5	–	0	.545	17	–	9	–	0	.654
Northwestern ‍‍‍	6	–	7	–	0	.462	10	–	8	–	0	.556
Indiana ‍‍‍	5	–	6	–	0	.455	13	–	15	–	0	.464
Iowa ‍‍‍	5	–	8	–	0	.385	11	–	16	–	0	.407
Michigan State ‍‍‍	4	–	7	–	0	.364	16	–	13	–	0	.552
Purdue ‍‍‍	5	–	10	–	0	.333	14	–	14	–	0	.500
Illinois ‍‍‍	4	–	11	–	0	.267	15	–	18	–	1	.456
† – Conference champion y – Invited to the NCAA tournament

1956 Eastern Intercollegiate Baseball League baseball standings
	Conf.						Overall
Team	W		L		T	PCT	W		L		T	PCT
Yale ‍†‍‍	9	–	2	–	0	.818	19	–	15	–	0	.559
Princeton ‍‍‍	7	–	3	–	0	.700	11	–	9	–	1	.548
Columbia ‍‍‍	6	–	3	–	0	.667	11	–	5	–	1	.676
Cornell ‍‍‍	5	–	4	–	0	.556	10	–	8	–	0	.556
Harvard ‍‍‍	5	–	4	–	0	.556	18	–	6	–	0	.750
Army ‍‍‍	4	–	4	–	0	.500	9	–	10	–	0	.474
Navy ‍‍‍	4	–	4	–	0	.500	13	–	7	–	1	.643
Dartmouth ‍‍‍	3	–	5	–	0	.375	4	–	11	–	0	.267
Penn ‍‍‍	1	–	7	–	0	.125	8	–	16	–	0	.333
Brown ‍‍‍	1	–	8	–	0	.111	2	–	15	–	0	.118
† – Conference champion

1956 Missouri Valley Conference baseball standings
	Conf.				Overall
Team	W		L	PCT	W		L	PCT
Bradley ‍†‍‡‍^{y}	7	–	2	.778	27	–	8	.771
Oklahoma A&M ‍‍‍	7	–	2	.778	11	–	10	.524
Saint Louis ‍‍‍	6	–	3	.667	13	–	6	.684
Houston ‍‍‍	5	–	4	.556	14	–	10	.583
Tulsa ‍‍‍	5	–	4	.556	8	–	12	.400
Detroit ‍‍‍	4	–	5	.444	9	–	11	.450
Wichita State ‍‍‍	1	–	8	.111	4	–	13	.235
Drake ‍‍‍	1	–	8	.111	4	–	13	.235
† – Conference champion ‡ – Tournament champion y – Invited to the NCAA tournament As of June 30, 1956; Rankings from Coaches' Poll

1956 Pacific Coast Conference baseball standings
	Conf.						Overall
Team	W		L		T	PCT	W		L		T	PCT
North Division
Washington State ‍†‍‍^{y}	11	–	3	–	0	.786	28	–	8	–	0	.778
Oregon ‍‍‍	8	–	5	–	0	.615	18	–	8	–	0	.692
Oregon State ‍‍‍	7	–	8	–	0	.467	17	–	13	–	0	.567
Washington ‍‍‍	5	–	9	–	0	.357	5	–	11	–	0	.313
Idaho ‍‍‍	4	–	9	–	0	.308	0	–	0	–	0	–
California Intercollegiate Baseball Association
USC ‍†‍‍	14	–	2	–	0	.875	21	–	5	–	0	.808
California ‍‍‍	9	–	7	–	0	.563	25	–	9	–	0	.735
Stanford ‍‍‍	9	–	7	–	0	.563	24	–	10	–	1	.700
UCLA ‍‍‍	5	–	11	–	0	.313	11	–	21	–	2	.353
Santa Clara ‍‍‍	3	–	13	–	0	.188	6	–	22	–	0	.214
† – Conference champion y – Invited to the NCAA tournament

1956 Southeastern Conference baseball standings
	Conf.				Overall
Team	W		L	PCT	W		L	PCT
Florida ‍†‍‍^{y}	13	–	3	.813	20	–	4	.833
Ole Miss ‍‍‍^{y}	13	–	3	.813	24	–	10	.706
Alabama ‍‍‍	15	–	5	.750	18	–	7	.720
Georgia ‍‍‍	10	–	5	.667	16	–	7	.696
Auburn ‍‍‍	9	–	7	.563	12	–	11	.522
Tennessee ‍‍‍	7	–	8	.467	10	–	13	.435
LSU ‍‍‍	7	–	9	.438	9	–	11	.450
Tulane ‍‍‍	7	–	9	.438	11	–	11	.500
Mississippi State ‍‍‍	6	–	9	.400	11	–	9	.550
Georgia Tech ‍‍‍	4	–	9	.308	11	–	12	.478
Vanderbilt ‍‍‍	3	–	12	.200	6	–	15	.286
Kentucky ‍‍‍	1	–	12	.077	4	–	18	.182
† – Conference champion y – Invited to the College World Series; As of June 18, 1956; Rankings from Coaches' Poll

1956 Yankee Conference baseball standings
	Conf.						Overall
Team	W		L		T	PCT	W		L		T	PCT
New Hampshire ‍†‍‍^{y}	7	–	1	–	0	.875	13	–	7	–	0	.650
UMass ‍‍‍^{y}	7	–	1	–	1	.833	10	–	6	–	1	.618
Connecticut ‍‍‍	4	–	4	–	1	.500	9	–	8	–	2	.526
Vermont ‍‍‍^{y}	3	–	3	–	0	.500	18	–	6	–	0	.750
Rhode Island ‍‍‍	2	–	7	–	0	.222	10	–	7	–	0	.588
Maine ‍‍‍	0	–	7	–	0	.000	7	–	11	–	1	.395
† – Conference champion y – Invited to the NCAA Tournament; As of June 30, 1956

== College World Series ==
The 1956 season marked the tenth NCAA Baseball Tournament, which culminated with the eight team College World Series. The College World Series was held in Omaha, Nebraska. The eight teams played a double-elimination format, with Minnesota claiming their first championship with a 12–1 win over Arizona in the final.

Upper round 1
Arizona	3
NYU	0
Minnesota	4
Wyoming	0
Ole Miss	13
New Hampshire	2
Bradley	4
Washington State	3

Upper round 2
Arizona	2
Minnesota	3
Ole Miss	4
Bradley	0
Lower round 1
NYU	2
Wyoming	8
New Hampshire	6
Washington State	3

Upper final
Minnesota	13
Ole Miss	5
Lower round 2
Bradley	12
Wyoming	8
Arizona	1
New Hampshire	0

Semifinals
Minnesota	8
Bradley	3
Ole Miss	3
Arizona	7

Final
Minnesota	4	12
Arizona	10	1
