= Jerry Thomas (baseball) =

American baseball player (1936–2026)

- Pitcher
- Born: Gerald E. Thomas; August 1, 1936; Minneapolis, Minnesota, U.S.
- Died: January 6, 2026 (aged 89); St. Louis Park, Minnesota, U.S.
- Batted: Right Threw: Right

Career highlights and awards
- College World Series Most Outstanding Player (1956)

Gerald E. Thomas (August 1, 1936 – January 6, 2026) was an American baseball pitcher. He won the 1956 College World Series Most Outstanding Player award while a junior at University of Minnesota. He was one of three players from University of Minnesota to win that award. The others are John Erickson and Dave Winfield.

== Biography ==
Thomas was an All-American in 1956. He played professionally from 1957 to 1960, never reaching the majors.

He was inducted into the University of Minnesota Sports Hall of Fame in 1995.

Thomas died on January 6, 2026, at the age of 89.
