= List of NCAA Division I programs without a college baseball team =

The following is a list of members of the National Collegiate Athletic Association (NCAA) Division I that do not currently sponsor baseball as an intercollegiate sport:

Have announced an intention to reinstate the baseball program

School Name	Common Name	Nickname	Location	State	Last Known Ballpark	First Season (if known)	Last Season	Baseball conference at time of disbanding, if known	Current Main Conference	NCAA Regional Appearances	NCAA CWS Appearances	Notes and Citations
American University	American	Eagles	Washington	DC	Reeves Field	1928	1986	CAA	Patriot	(0)	(0)	
Boise State University	Boise State	Broncos	Boise	ID	Borah Field (Note: Boise State played at on an on-campus baseball field through 1979; the construction of BSU Pavilion (now ExtraMile Arena) forced the team to play at Borah High School in the 1980 season, its final season before it was discontinued.)	1936	1980	Northern Pacific	Mountain West	(0)	(0)	
Boise State University	Boise State	Broncos	Boise	ID	Memorial Stadium	2020	2020	Mountain West	Mountain West	(0)	(0)	
Boston University	Boston University / Boston U	Terriers	Boston	MA			1972		Patriot	(4) 1954, 1956, 1968, 1969	(0)	
Boston University	Boston University / Boston U	Terriers	Boston	MA	Parsons Field/Tufts Field	1986	1995	America East	Patriot	(4) 1954, 1956, 1968, 1969	(0)	
University at Buffalo	Buffalo	Bulls	Buffalo	NY		1949	1987		MAC	(2) 1971, 1973	(0)	
University at Buffalo	Buffalo	Bulls	Buffalo	NY	Amherst Audubon Field	2000	2017	MAC	MAC	(2) 1971, 1973	(0)	
University of Tennessee at Chattanooga	Chattanooga	Mocs	Chattanooga	TN	Engel Stadium		1982	Southern	Southern	(0) D-I (1) D-II: 1971	(0)	
Chicago State University	Chicago State	Cougars	Chicago	IL	Cougar Stadium		2020	WAC	Northeast	(0)	(0)	
Cleveland State University	Cleveland State	Vikings	Cleveland	OH	All Pro Freight Stadium	1932	2011	Horizon	Horizon	(0) D-I (1) D-II: 1973	(0)	
Colgate University	Colgate	Raiders	Hamilton	NY	O'Hora Field	1896	1996	Independent	Patriot	(4) 1955, 1960, 1966, 1969	(1) 1955	
University of Colorado Boulder	Colorado	Buffaloes	Boulder	CO	Prentup Field		1980	Big 8	Big 12	(0)	(0)	
Colorado State University	Colorado State	Rams	Fort Collins	CO	Ram Field		1992	WAC	Mountain West	(0) (Note: Tournaments before 1954 did not include a regional round that counted as part of the NCAA tournament competition. Thus, Colorado State and Wisconsin each made a College World Series appearance in 1950 but not a regional appearance.)	(1) 1950	
University of Denver	Denver	Pioneers	Denver	CO	All-City Field	1867	1997	Rocky Mountain (D-II) (Note: Denver sponsored baseball as D-I sport before moving to NAIA in 1980, dropped baseball before rejoining D-I in 1999)	Summit	(6) 1947, 1957, 1965, 1968, 1970, 1973	(0)	
DePaul University	DePaul	Blue Demons	Chicago	IL		1898	1926		Big East	(0)	(0)	
DePaul University	DePaul	Blue Demons	Chicago	IL		1947	1948		Big East	(0)	(0)	
University of Detroit Mercy	Detroit Mercy	Titans	Detroit	MI	James K. Campbell Athletic Complex	1895	2004	Horizon	Horizon	(5) 1959, 1960, 1961, 1962, 1965	(0)	
Drake University	Drake	Bulldogs	Des Moines	IA	Sec Taylor Stadium	1893	1974	Missouri Valley	Missouri Valley	(0)	(0)	
Drexel University	Drexel	Dragons	Philadelphia	PA	Drexel Field	1929	2003	CAA	CAA	(0)	(0)	
Duquesne University	Duquesne	Dukes	Pittsburgh	PA	Duquesne Baseball Field	1888	2010	A-10	A-10	(0)	(0)	
East Texas A&M University	East Texas A&M	Lions	Commerce	TX			1930		Southland	(0)	(0)	
Eastern Washington University	Eastern Washington	Eagles	Cheney	WA	Ed Chissus Field	1903	1990	Pac-10	Big Sky	(0)	(0)	
Furman University	Furman	Paladins	Greenville	SC	Latham Baseball Stadium		2020	Southern	Southern	(5) 1965, 1969, 1976, 1991, 2005	(0)	
University of Wisconsin-Green Bay	Green Bay	Phoenix	Green Bay	WI					Horizon	--	--	no record of having ever sponsored a team
Hampton University	Hampton	Pirates	Hampton	VA			1972	CIAA (NAIA)	CAA	(0)	(0)	
Howard University	Howard	Bison	Washington	DC	Joe Cannon Stadium (MD) Banneker Field (DC)		2002	MEAC	MEAC	(0)	(0)	
University of Idaho	Idaho	Vandals	Moscow	ID	Guy Wicks Field		1980	Northern Pacific	Big Sky	(3) 1966, 1967, 1969	(0)	
Idaho State University	Idaho State	Bengals	Pocatello	ID			1974	Big Sky	Big Sky	(0)	(0)	
Iowa State University	Iowa State	Cyclones	Ames	IA	Cap Timm Field	1892	2001	Big 12	Big 12	(3) 1957, 1970, 1971	(2) 1957, 1970	
Indiana University Indianapolis (Note: Before the 2024–25 school year, the current IU Indy athletic program represented Indiana University–Purdue University Indianapolis (IUPUI). At the end of the 2023–24 school year, the Indiana University and Purdue University systems dissolved IUPUI, replacing it with separate IU- and Purdue-affiliated institutions.)	IU Indy	Jaguars	Indianapolis	IN	Indianapolis Sports Park	1979	2001	Summit	Horizon	(0)	(0)	
University of Missouri-Kansas City	Kansas City	Roos	Kansas City	MO					Summit	(0)	(0)	
University of Missouri-Kansas City	Kansas City	Roos	Kansas City	MO		1971	1972		Summit	(0)	(0)	
Loyola University Maryland	Loyola (MD)	Greyhounds	Baltimore	MD			1979		Patriot	(0)	(0)	
Loyola University Chicago	Loyola Chicago	Ramblers	Chicago	IL			1925		Missouri Valley	(0)	(0)	
Marquette University	Marquette	Golden Eagles	Milwaukee	WI					Big East	(0)	(0)	
University of Montana	Montana	Grizzlies	Missoula	MT	Campbell Field		1972	Big Sky	Big Sky	(0)	(0)	
Montana State University	Montana State	Bobcats	Bozeman	MT			1971	Big Sky	Big Sky	(0)	(0)	
Morgan State University	Morgan State	Bears	Baltimore	MD			1986 (Note: Several online pages reference Morgan State dropping baseball in 2001, but there is no digital record of a team existing after 1986. They are not listed in any of the MEAC's official baseball season-by-season conference standings, which began in 1991 (see "MEAC Baseball Records Book"). In printed articles, they were not listed as a participant MEAC baseball tournament in 1987 (see "HU to defend MEAC title") and they still did not have a team by 1993 (see McIver).)		MEAC	(0)	(0)	
North Carolina Central University	NC Central	Eagles	Durham	NC		1911	1975	MEAC	MEAC	(0)	(0)	
North Carolina Central University	NC Central	Eagles	Durham	NC	Durham Athletic Park	2007	2021	MEAC	MEAC	(0)	(0)	
University of New Hampshire	New Hampshire	Wildcats	Durham	NH	Brackett Field	1911	1997	America East	America East	(2) 1956, 1974	(1) 1956	
University of North Dakota	North Dakota	Fighting Hawks	Grand Forks	ND	Harold Kraft Memorial Field		2016	WAC	Summit	(0) D-I (2) D-II: 1993, 2004	(0) D-I (1) D-II: 1993	
University of North Texas	North Texas	Mean Green	Denton	TX		1920	1925		American	(0)	(0)	
University of North Texas	North Texas	Mean Green	Denton	TX	Mack Park	1984	1988	Southland	American	(0)	(0)	
Northern Arizona University	Northern Arizona	Lumberjacks	Flagstaff	AZ	Lumberjack Field	1932	1981	Independent (Note: Northern Arizona's baseball program competed as an independent after its primary conference, the Big Sky, stopped sponsoring baseball as a conference in 1974.)	Big Sky	(0)	(0)	
University of Northern Iowa	Northern Iowa	Panthers	Cedar Falls	IA	Riverfront Stadium		2009	Missouri Valley	Missouri Valley	(3) D-1: 1958, 1961, 2001 (2) D-II: 1968, 1972	(0)	
Portland State University	Portland State	Vikings	Portland	OR	Portland Civic Stadium		1998	Pac-10	Big Sky	(1) D-I: 1977 (2) D-II: 1968, 1969	(0)	
Providence College	Providence	Friars	Providence	RI	Hendricken Field		1999	Big East	Big East	(9) 1963, 1968, 1970, 1972, 1973, 1974, 1992, 1995, 1999	(0)	
Purdue University Fort Wayne	Purdue Fort Wayne	Mastodons	Fort Wayne	IN	Mastodon Field	1970	2025	Horizon	Horizon	(0)	(0)	
Robert Morris University	Robert Morris	Colonials	Moon Township	PA			1985	ECAC Metro	Horizon	(0)	(0)	
Southern Methodist University	SMU	Mustangs	University Park (Note: The campus mailing address is Dallas.)	TX	Reverchon Park	1919	1980	SWC	ACC	(0)	(0)	
South Carolina State University	South Carolina State	Bulldogs	Orangeburg	SC			1973	MEAC	MEAC	(0)	(0)	
South Carolina State University	South Carolina State	Bulldogs	Orangeburg	SC		1991	1993 (Note: Official MEAC records list South Carolina State in the standings from 1991-93, and other NCAA varsity college baseball schedules also have them listed during this time period. However, a newspaper article from March 1991 states that the team was not recognized at the time by any collegiate organization (see Brunson, Dennis.))	MEAC	MEAC	(0)	(0)	
University of South Dakota	South Dakota	Coyotes	Vermillion	SD	Prentis Park	1886	2004	North Central (D-II)	Summit	(0)	(0)	
Southern Utah University	Southern Utah	Thunderbirds	Cedar City	UT	Thunderbird Field		2012	Summit	Big Sky	(0)	(0)	
Saint Francis University	St. Francis (PA)	Red Flash	Loretto	PA	Pine Bowl		1931		Northeast	(0)	(0)	
Saint Francis University	St. Francis (PA)	Red Flash	Loretto	PA	Pine Bowl	1941	1979 (Note: School newspaper records indicate the Saint Francis University (then Saint Francis College) team was dropped multiple times in the 1970's, and sponsored it only in the fall in some years. No spring team existed later than 1979 and it is unclear what conference or division affiliation the team competed under in its final years.)		Northeast	(0)	(0)	
St. Francis College	St. Francis Brooklyn	Terriers	Brooklyn	NY			2006	Northeast	None (Note: St. Francis College shut down its athletic program at the end of the 2022–23 school year.)	(0)	(0)	
Syracuse University	Syracuse	Orange (Note: The Syracuse male athletic teams, including the baseball team, were known as the Orangemen at the time of the team's disbanding.)	Syracuse	NY	Lew Carr Field		1972		ACC	(1) 1961	(1) 1961	
Temple University	Temple	Owls	Philadelphia	PA	Skip Wilson Field		2014	American	American	(13) 1959, 1963, 1968, 1972, 1973, 1975, 1976, 1977, 1978, 1981, 1983, 1984, 2001	(2) 1972, 1977	
Tennessee State University	Tennessee State	Tigers (Note: In April 2024, Tennessee State announced its intention to reinstate its baseball program by no later than 2028.)	Nashville	TN	Tiger Field		1993	Ohio Valley	Ohio Valley	(0)	(0)	
University of Tulsa	Tulsa	Golden Hurricane	Tulsa	OK	Oiler Park	1948	1980	Missouri Valley	American	(7) 1969, 1970, 1971, 1972, 1973, 1974, 1975	(2) 1969, 1971	runners-up in 1969
Utah State University	Utah State	Aggies	Logan	UT			1968		Mountain West	(0)	(0)	
University of Texas at El Paso	UTEP	Miners	El Paso	TX	Dudley Field		1985	WAC	CUSA	(0)	(0)	
University of Vermont	Vermont	Catamounts	Burlington	VT	Centennial Field	1888	2009	America East	America East	(2) 1956, 1962	(0)	
Weber State University	Weber State	Wildcats	Ogden	UT	Ben Lomond Ballpark	1962	1974	Big Sky	Big Sky	(3) 1968, 1970, 1972	(0)	
University of Wisconsin–Madison	Wisconsin	Badgers	Madison	WI	Guy Lowman Field	1918	1991	Big Ten	Big Ten	(0)	(1) 1950	
University of Wyoming	Wyoming	Cowboys	Laramie	WY	Cowboy Field		1996	WAC	Mountain West	(4) 1954, 1955, 1956, 1961	(1) 1956	

== See also ==
- List of NCAA Division I non-football programs
- List of defunct college football teams
- List of defunct college basketball teams
- List of defunct college hockey teams
- List of NCAA Division I baseball programs
