= 1950 College World Series =

1950 NCAA I baseball tournament
- Season: 1950
- Teams: 8
- Finals site: Johnny Rosenblatt Stadium; Omaha, NE
- Champions: Texas (2nd title)
- Runner-up: Washington State (1st CWS Appearance)
- Winning coach: Bibb Falk (2nd title)
- MOP: Ray VanCleef (Rutgers)

The 1950 College World Series was the fourth NCAA-sanctioned baseball tournament that determined a national champion. The tournament was held as the conclusion of the 1950 NCAA baseball season and was played at Johnny Rosenblatt Stadium in Omaha, Nebraska from June 15 to June 23. It was the first College World Series to be held at the stadium, which hosted the event through 2010. The tournament's champion was the Texas Longhorns, coached by Bibb Falk. The Most Outstanding Player was Ray VanCleef of Rutgers. The championship was the second consecutive for the Longhorns.

The tournament consisted of no preliminary round of play, as teams were selected directly into the College World Series. From 1947 to 1949, there likewise was no preliminary round, as the teams were chosen based on committee selections, conference champions, and district playoffs. From 1954 to the present, teams compete in the NCAA Division I baseball tournament preliminary round(s), to determine the eight teams that play in the College World Series.

== Participants ==
School	Conference	Record (conference)	Head coach	CWS appearances	CWS best finish	CWS record	Berth
Alabama	SEC	20–10 (12–4)	Tilden Campbell	0 (last: none)	none	0–0	Won District III Playoff
Bradley	MVC	17–14 (7–1)	Leo Schrall	0 (last: none)	none	0–0	Won District V Playoff
Colorado A&M (Note: Known today as Colorado State University. Not to be confused with the pre-1970 Colorado State College, currently known as the University of Northern Colorado.)	Skyline	17–2 (n/a)	Mark Duncan	0 (last: none)	none	0–0	Won District VII Playoff
Rutgers	Independent	17–4–1	George Case	0 (last: none)	none	0–0	District II Selection
Texas	SWC	22–5 (14–1)	Bibb Falk	1 (last: 1949)	1st (1949)	3–0	Won District VI Playoff
Tufts	Independent	16–4	John Ricker	0 (last: none)	none	0–0	District I Selection
Washington State	PCC	29–4 (12–2)	Buck Bailey	0 (last: none)	none	0–0	Won District VIII Playoff
Wisconsin	Big Nine	17–7 (9–3)	Arthur Mansfield	0 (last: none)	none	0–0	Won District IV Playoff

== Results ==
=== Bracket ===
Upper round 1
Texas	2
Rutgers	4
Wisconsin	7
Colorado A&M	3
Alabama	9
Bradley	2
Washington State	3
Tufts	1

Upper round 2
Rutgers	5
Wisconsin	3
Alabama	1
Washington State	9
Lower round 1
Texas	3
Colorado A&M	1
Tufts	5
Bradley	4

Upper final
Rutgers	1
Washington State	3^{10}
Lower round 2
Wisconsin	3
Alabama	1
Texas	7
Tufts	0

Semifinals
Washington State	1
Texas	12
Wisconsin	2
Rutgers	16

Preliminary final
Texas	15
Rutgers	9

Final
Washington State	0
Texas	3

=== Game results ===
Date	Game	Winner	Score	Loser	Notes
June 15	Game 1	Rutgers	4–2	Texas	
June 15	Game 2	Wisconsin	7–3	Colorado A&M	
June 16	Game 3	Washington State	3–1	Tufts	
June 16	Game 4	Alabama	9–2	Bradley	
June 17	Game 5	Texas	3–1	Colorado A&M	Colorado A&M eliminated
June 17	Game 6	Tufts	5–4	Bradley	Bradley eliminated
June 18	Game 7	Rutgers	5–3	Wisconsin	
June 18	Game 8	Washington State	9–1	Alabama	
June 19	Game 9	Texas	7–0	Tufts	Jim Ehler throws a no-hitter, Tufts eliminated
June 19	Game 10	Wisconsin	3–1	Alabama	Alabama eliminated
June 20	Game 11	Washington State	3–1 (10)	Rutgers	
June 20	Game 12	Texas	12–1	Washington State	
June 21	Game 13	Rutgers	16–2	Wisconsin	Wisconsin eliminated
June 22	Game 14	Texas	15–9	Rutgers	Rutgers eliminated
June 23	Final	Texas	3–0	Washington State	Texas wins CWS

== Notable players ==
- Alabama: John Baumgartner, Frank Lary, Al Lary, Guy Morton, Jr., Ed White, Al Worthington
- Bradley: Bill Tuttle, Andy Varga
- Colorado A&M: Don “Lefty” Straub'
- Rutgers: Hardy Peterson
- Texas: Charlie Gorin, Kal Segrist, Murray Wall
- Tufts: Bud Niles, George Minot, Ed Schluntz, Dave Lincoln
- Washington State: Gene Conley, Ted Tappe
- Wisconsin: Thornton Kipper, Red Wilson

== Tournament notes ==
- Texas became the first team to win two consecutive College World Series.
- Jim Ehler threw the first no-hitter in College World Series history.
