= Tuttle (surname) =

Tuttle is an English surname. It may refer to:

== People ==
- A. Theodore Tuttle (1919–1986), American Mormon leader
- Ashley Tuttle (born 1971), American musical actress and dancer
- Bill Tuttle (1929–1998), American baseball player and public speaker
- Charles E. Tuttle (1915–1993), American publisher
- Daniel Sylvester Tuttle (1837–1923), American Episcopal bishop
- Dave Tuttle (born 1972), English football manager
- Elaina Marie Tuttle (1963–2016), American ornithologist and behavioral geneticist
- Elbert Tuttle (1897–1996), American judge
- Elizabeth Tuttle (1645–c. 1691), American woman and eugenics study subject
- Emma Rood Tuttle (1839–1916), American writer and poet
- Francis Tuttle (1920–1997) American educator
- Frank Tuttle (1892–1963), American film director and writer
- Fred Tuttle (1919–2003), American farmer, actor, and candidate for the US Senate
- Jerry Tuttle (American football) (1926–2006), American football player
- Gina Tuttle (born 1973), American actress and voice artist
- Herbert Tuttle (1846–1894), American historian
- Hiram A. Tuttle (1837–1911), American politician from New Hampshire
- Horace Parnell Tuttle (1837–1923), American astronomer
- Hudson Tuttle (1836–1910), American spiritualist from Ohio
- James M. Tuttle (1823–1892), American politician from Iowa, Union Army general in the Civil War
- Jerry Tuttle (American football) (1926–2006), American football player
- Jerry O. Tuttle (1934–2018), United States Navy admiral
- John Tuttle (disambiguation)
- Julia Tuttle (1849–1898), American businesswoman, farmer, and "Mother of Miami"
- Karen Tuttle (1920–2010), American viola teacher
- Lelia Judson Tuttle (1878–1967), American missionary educator in China
- Lisa Tuttle (born 1952), American author
- Lurene Tuttle (1906–1986), American character actress
- Lyle Tuttle (1931–2019), American tattoo artist
- Matt Tuttle (musician), American drummer
- Marcus Tuttle (1830–1884), American politician from Iowa
- Merlin Tuttle (born 1941), American ecologist
- Molly Tuttle (born 1993), American bluegrass musician
- O. Frank Tuttle (1916–1983), American mineralogist and geochemist
- Oral P. Tuttle (1889–1957), American lawyer and politician
- Perry Tuttle (born 1959), American football player
- Richard Tuttle (born 1941), American post-minimalist visual artist
- Rick Tuttle (born 1940), American politician in Los Angeles
- Robert H. Tuttle (born 1943), American businessman and diplomat
- Russell Tuttle (born 1939), primate morphologist and paleoanthropologist
- Seth Tuttle (born 1992), American basketball player
- Siri Tuttle, American linguist
- Shy Tuttle (born 1995), American football player
- Steve Tuttle (born 1966), Canadian hockey player
- Tricia Tuttle (born 1970) American film journalist
- William Tuttle (disambiguation)

== Fictional characters ==
- Albert "Al" Tuttle, originally named Bob, a recurring side character in the animated TV series American Dad
- Archibald "Harry" Tuttle, played by Robert De Niro in the 1985 film Brazil
- Elmo Tuttle, a character in the comic strip Blondie
- Gregory Tuttle, an alias used by Alexei Volkoff, a character in the TV series Chuck
- the title characters of The Tuttles of Tahiti, a 1942 American film
- Captain Tuttle, the fictitious central character in a 1973 episode of the TV series M*A*S*H

== See also ==
- Judge Tuttle (disambiguation)
- Senator Tuttle (disambiguation)
