= Arthur Mansfield =

American baseball player and coach (1906–1985)

Biographical details
- Born: November 30, 1906; Cleveland, Ohio, U.S.
- Died: June 1, 1985 (aged 78); Minocqua, Wisconsin, U.S.

Playing career
- 1927–1929: Wisconsin
- 1930: Springfield Blue Sox
- 1931: Bridgeport Bears
- 1932: Dayton Ducks
- 1933: Springfield Chicks
- Position: Outfielder

Coaching career (HC unless noted)
- 1940–1970: Wisconsin

Head coaching record
- Overall: 441–352–6
- Tournaments: 2–2 (NCAA)

Accomplishments and honors

Championships
- 2 Big Ten regular season (1946, 1950)

Arthur W. Mansfield (November 30, 1906 – June 1, 1985), nicknamed Dynamite or Dynie, was an American baseball coach and outfielder. He played college baseball for Wisconsin for coach Guy Lowman from 1927 to 1929 before playing professionally from 1930 to 1933. He also played college football and boxing. He then served as the head baseball coach of the Wisconsin Badgers from 1940 to 1970, leading the Badgers to a fourth-place finish in the 1950 College World Series.

== Playing career ==
Mansfield attended West Technical High School in Cleveland, Ohio being enrolling at the University of Wisconsin, where he competed in football, baseball, basketball and boxing. At Wisconsin, he played first base, was team captain his senior year, and a member of Sigma Pi fraternity. After graduating in 1929, he became the athletic director of Springfield High School (Wisconsin) before playing minor league baseball. While with the Springfield Blue Sox of the Central League he played right field until his contract was purchased by the New York Giants at the end of the 1930 season.

== Head coaching record ==
Record table
Season	Team	Overall	Conference	Standing	Postseason
Wisconsin Badgers (Big Nine/Ten Conference) (1940–1970)
1940	Wisconsin	9–12–2	5–7	6th	
1941	Wisconsin	12–11	5–6	6th	
1942	Wisconsin	11–10	7–5	3rd	
1943	Wisconsin	8–10	5–3	2nd	
1944	Wisconsin	6–10	4–5	7th	
1945	Wisconsin	13–5	8–4	2nd	
1946	Wisconsin	16–7	9–2	1st	
1947	Wisconsin	10–11	6–4	4th	
1948	Wisconsin	14–14	5–6	T-5th	
1949	Wisconsin	8–17	3–9	T-8th	
1950	Wisconsin	19–9	9–3	T-1st	College World Series
1951	Wisconsin	14–8–1	5–5–1	5th	
1952	Wisconsin	18–8	9–6	3rd	
1953	Wisconsin	19–8	6–5	6th	
1954	Wisconsin	17–7–1	10–3–1	2nd	
1955	Wisconsin	16–12	7–8	7th	
1956	Wisconsin	20–7	8–4	3rd	
1957	Wisconsin	14–9	3–7	9th	
1958	Wisconsin	17–11	8–7	5th	
1959	Wisconsin	17–13	9–6	T-2nd	
1960	Wisconsin	14–6–1	5–4	3rd	
1961	Wisconsin	9–19–1	5–9	6th	
1962	Wisconsin	14–9	8–6	4th	
1963	Wisconsin	15–15	8–6	5th	
1964	Wisconsin	14–14	8–7	T-4th	
1965	Wisconsin	14–13	6–9	9th	
1966	Wisconsin	9–18	6–9	7th	
1967	Wisconsin	18–15	11–6	4th	
1968	Wisconsin	18–9	11–5	3rd	
1969	Wisconsin	14–18	7–7	T-5th	
1970	Wisconsin	22–16	8–7	4th	
Wisconsin:		441–352–6	42–42–1		
Total:		441–352–6			
National champion Postseason invitational champion Conference regular season champion Conference regular season and conference tournament champion Division regular season champion Division regular season and conference tournament champion Conference tournament champion
