= 1950 Bradley Braves baseball team =

American college baseball season

1950 Bradley Braves baseball

Missouri Valley regular season champions Missouri Valley tournament champions District V Playoff champions

College World Series, T-7th
- Conference: Missouri Valley Conference
- East
- Record: 17–15–1 (5–0 MVC)
- Head coach: Leo Schrall (2nd season)
- Home stadium: Tom Connor Field

1950 Missouri Valley Conference baseball standings
	Conf.						Overall
Team	W		L		T	PCT	W		L		T	PCT
East
Bradley ^{x}‍‍‡‍	5	–	0	–	0	1.000	17	–	15	–	1	.530
Saint Louis ‍‍‍	3	–	2	–	0	.600	0	–	0	–	0	–
Detroit ‍‍‍	1	–	3	–	0	.250	10	–	6	–	0	.625
Drake ‍‍‍	0	–	4	–	0	.000	0	–	0	–	0	–
West
Oklahoma A&M ^{x}‍‍‍	6	–	3	–	0	.667	15	–	7	–	0	.682
Tulsa ‍‍‍	3	–	3	–	0	.500	6	–	10	–	0	.375
Wichita State ‍‍‍	1	–	5	–	0	.167	4	–	14	–	0	.222
x – Division champion ‡ – Tournament champion As of June 30, 1950

The 1950 Bradley Braves baseball team represented Bradley University in the 1950 NCAA baseball season. The Braves played their home games at Tom Connor Field. The team was coached by Leo Schrall in his 2nd year at Bradley.

The Braves won the District V playoff to advance to the College World Series, where they were defeated by the Tufts Jumbos.

== Roster ==
1950 Bradley Braves baseball team
Players
Coaches

#	Pos.	Name	B/T	Height	Weight	Year	Home town
	P	Don Alford	/	—	—	Jr	Peoria, Illinois
		John Bjorkman	/	—	—	Sr	Lockport, Illinois
		Roger Bruninga	/	—	—	Jr	Glasford, Illinois
	OF	Al Daynor	/	—	—		Chicago, Illinois
		Bill Ellsbury	/	—	—		Waukegan, Illinois
		Bill Fivek	/	—	—		Berwyn, Illinois
		Adolph Friedrich	/	—	—	Sr	Peoria, Illinois
		Harmon Groover	/	—	—	Sr	Canton, Illinois
	INF	Jack Hills	/	—	—	Fr	Joliet, Illinois
		Harry Levonian	/	—	—		Racine, Wisconsin
		Jack Mallory	/	—	—		Peoria, Illinois
		Russ Mason	/	—	—	Jr	Peoria, Illinois
	INF	Gene Melchiorre	/	—	—	Jr	Highland Park, Illinois
		Ken Olson	/	—	—		Erie, Illinois
		Bob Oltman	/	—	—		Pekin, Illinois
		Fred Parks	/	—	—	Jr	Chicago, Illinois
		Fred Schlichtmann	/	—	—		Centralia, Illinois
		Don Schnake	/	—	—		Centralia, Illinois
		Gene Stevens	/	—	—		Joliet, Illinois
		Don Sutter	/	—	—		Peoria, Illinois
	INF	Emil Syngel	R/	—	—		Chicago, Illinois
	OF	Bill Tuttle	/	—	—		Farmington, Illinois
		Bill Wasack	/	—	—		Chicago Illinois
		Fred Weeks	/	—	—		Peoria, Illinois
		Ken Wells	/	—	—		Weldon, Illinois
		Bill Wilson	/	—	—		Lewistown, Illinois

Head coach

Leo Schrall

Assistant coach(es)

Legend

- (C) Team captain
- (S) Suspended
- (I) Ineligible
- Injured
- Current redshirt

== Schedule ==
1950 Bradley Braves baseball game log
Regular season
April (8–7–1)

#	Date	Opponent	Site/stadium	Score	Overall record	MVC record
1	April 1	Wisconsin	Tom Connor Field • Peoria, Illinois	8–7	1–0	–
2	April 1	Wisconsin	Tom Connor Field • Peoria, Illinois	5–10	1–1	–
3	April 4	at Florida	Perry Field • Gainesville, Florida	8–2	1–2	–
4	April 5	at Florida	Perry Field • Gainesville, Florida	6–10	1–3	–
5	April 6	vs Clemson	Alfond Stadium • Winter Park, Florida	3–2	2–3	–
6	April 7	at Rollins	Alfond Stadium • Winter Park, Florida	0–0	2–3–1	–
7	April 7	at Rollins	Alfond Stadium • Winter Park, Florida	11–8	3–3–1	–
8	April 8	vs Clemson	Alfond Stadium • Winter Park, Florida	1–9	3–4–1	–
9	April 10	at Florida State	Seminole Field • Tallahassee, Florida	2–3	3–5–1	–
10	April 11	at Florida State	Seminole Field • Tallahassee, Florida	10–1	4–5–1	–
11	April 15	Chicago	Tom Connor Field • Peoria, Illinois	3–6	4–6–1	–
12	April 17	at Iowa	Unknown • Iowa City, Iowa	0–1	4–7–1	–
13	April 18	at Iowa	Unknown • Iowa City, Iowa	6–2	5–7–1	–
14	April 21	Drake	Tom Connor Field • Peoria, Illinois	11–2	6–7–1	1–0
15	April 22	Drake	Tom Connor Field • Peoria, Illinois	10–4	7–7–1	2–0
16	April 29	Saint Louis	Tom Connor Field • Peoria, Illinois	4–0	8–7–1	3–0

May (3–1)

#	Date	Opponent	Site/stadium	Score	Overall record	MVC record
17	May 5	at Detroit	Unknown • Detroit, Michigan	9–0	9–7–1	4–0
18	May 6	at Detroit	Unknown • Detroit, Michigan	15–6	10–7–1	5–0
19	May 8	Arkansas	Tom Connor Field • Peoria, Illinois	10–2	11–7–1	5–0
20	May 10	at Chicago	Unknown • Chicago, Illinois	5–10	11–8–1	5–0

Postseason
MVC Tournament (2–1)

#	Date	Opponent	Site/stadium	Score	Overall record	MVC record
21	May 12	Oklahoma A&M	Tom Connor Field • Peoria, Illinois	9–3	12–8–1	5–0
22	May 13	Oklahoma A&M	Tom Connor Field • Peoria, Illinois	4–8	12–9–1	5–0
23	May 13	Oklahoma A&M	Tom Connor Field • Peoria, Illinois	2–1	13–9–1	5–0

May (2–1)

#	Date	Opponent	Site/stadium	Score	Overall record	MVC record
24	May 19	St. Thomas (Minnesota)	Tom Connor Field • Peoria, Illinois	10–5	14–9–1	5–0
25	May 20	St. Thomas (Minnesota)	Tom Connor Field • Peoria, Illinois	4–3	15–9–1	5–0
26	May 22	at Wisconsin	Guy Lowman Field • Madison, Wisconsin	4–6	15–10–1	5–0

District V Playoff (2–0)

#	Date	Opponent	Site/stadium	Score	Overall record	MVC record
27	May 30	at Nebraska	Husker Diamond • Lincoln, Nebraska	10–6	16–10–1	5–0
28	May 30	at Nebraska	Husker Diamond • Lincoln, Nebraska	8–4	17–10–1	5–0

June (0–3)

#	Date	Opponent	Site/stadium	Score	Overall record	MVC record
29	June 2	at Michigan State	Old College Field • East Lansing, Michigan	3–6	17–11–1	5–0
30	June 3	at Michigan State	Old College Field • East Lansing, Michigan	3–4	17–12–1	5–0
31	June 10	at Purdue	Unknown • West Lafayette, Indiana	5–10	17–13–1	5–0

College World Series (0–2)

#	Date	Opponent	Site/stadium	Score	Overall record	MVC record
32	June 16	vs Alabama	Omaha Municipal Stadium • Omaha, Nebraska	2–9	17–14–1	5–0
33	June 18	vs Tufts	Omaha Municipal Stadium • Omaha, Nebraska	4–5	17–15–1	5–0
