= List of College World Series appearances by team =

Annual American baseball tournament

This is a list of NCAA Division I schools that have advanced to the Men's College World Series as part of the Division I baseball tournament.

== Appearances ==
Team	Appearances	First	Last	Wins	Losses	Pct.	Titles
Alabama	6	1950	2026	11	12	.478	0
Arizona	19	1954	2025	43	32	.573	4
Arizona State	22	1964	2010	61	38	.616	5
Arkansas	12	1979	2025	18	22	.450	0
Auburn	6	1967	2022	4	11	.267	0
Baylor	3	1977	2005	2	6	.250	0
Boston College	4	1953	1967	6	8	.429	0
Bradley	2	1950	1956	2	4	.333	0
BYU	2	1968	1971	1	4	.200	0
California	6	1947	2011	11	8	.579	2
Cal State Fullerton	18	1975	2017	34	31	.523	4
Cal State Los Angeles	1	1977	1977	2	2	.500	0
The Citadel	1	1990	1990	1	2	.333	0
Clemson	12	1958	2010	12	24	.333	0
Coastal Carolina	2	2016	2025	6	2	.750	1
Colgate	1	1955	1955	1	2	.333	0
Colorado State (Note: Known in 1950 as Colorado A&M. At the same time, "Colorado State" referred to Colorado State College, now known as the University of Northern Colorado.)	1	1950	1950	0	2	.000	0
Connecticut	5	1957	1979	3	10	.231	0
Creighton	1	1991	1991	2	2	.500	0
Dartmouth	1	1970	1970	1	2	.333	0
Delaware	1	1970	1970	0	2	.000	0
Duke	3	1952	1961	3	6	.333	0
Eastern Michigan	2	1975	1976	4	4	.500	0
Florida	14	1988	2024	25	26	.490	1
Florida State	24	1957	2024	30	46	.395	0
Fresno State	4	1959	2008	9	8	.529	1
Georgia	7	1987	2026	12	13	.480	1
Georgia Southern (Note: Before July 1, 1990, Georgia Southern University was known as Georgia Southern College.)	2	1973	1990	1	4	.200	0
Georgia Tech	3	1994	2006	4	5	.444	0
Harvard	4	1968	1974	1	8	.111	0
Hawaii	1	1980	1980	3	2	.600	0
Holy Cross	4	1952	1963	9	7	.563	1
Houston	2	1953	1967	3	4	.429	0
Indiana	1	2013	2013	1	2	.333	0
Indiana State	1	1986	1986	0	2	.000	0
Iowa	1	1972	1972	0	2	.000	0
Iowa State	2	1957	1970	3	4	.429	0
Ithaca	1	1962	1962	1	2	.333	0
James Madison	1	1983	1983	0	2	.000	0
Kansas	1	1993	1993	0	2	.000	0
Kent State	1	2012	2012	1	2	.333	0
Kentucky	1	2024	2024	1	2	.333	0
Lafayette	4	1953	1965	3	8	.273	0
Long Beach State	4	1989	1998	6	8	.429	0
Louisiana	1	2000	2000	2	2	.500	0
Louisville	6	2007	2025	4	10	.286	0
Loyola Marymount	1	1986	1986	1	2	.333	0
LSU	20	1986	2025	51	29	.638	8
Maine	7	1964	1986	7	14	.333	0
Massachusetts	2	1954	1969	2	4	.333	0
Miami (FL)	25	1974	2016	48	42	.533	4
Michigan	8	1953	2019	16	14	.533	2
Michigan State	1	1954	1954	3	2	.600	0
Minnesota	5	1956	1977	17	7	.708	3
Mississippi State	12	1971	2021	18	24	.429	1
Missouri	6	1952	1964	18	11	.621	1
Missouri State	1	2003	2003	0	2	.000	0
Murray State	1	2025	2025	0	2	.000	0
Nebraska	3	2001	2005	1	6	.143	0
New Hampshire	1	1956	1956	1	2	.333	0
New Orleans	1	1984	1984	1	2	.333	0
NYU	2	1956	1969	3	4	.429	0
North Carolina	13	1960	2026	23	27	.460	0
NC State	4	1968	2024	5	5	.500	0
Northeastern	1	1966	1966	0	2	.000	0
Northern Colorado (Note: Before 1970, Northern Colorado was known as Colorado State College. Not to be confused with Colorado State University, known in 1950 as Colorado A&M.)	10	1952	1974	3	20	.130	0
Notre Dame	3	1957	2022	3	4	.429	0
Ohio	1	1970	1970	2	2	.500	0
Ohio State	4	1951	1967	9	7	.563	1
Oklahoma	12	1951	2026	21	17	.553	3
Oklahoma State (Note: Before 1957, Oklahoma State University was known as Oklahoma A&M.)	20	1954	2016	40	38	.513	1
Ole Miss	7	1956	2026	10	13	.435	1
Oral Roberts	2	1978	2023	2	4	.333	0
Oregon	1	1954	1954	0	2	.000	0
Oregon State	8	1952	2025	21	12	.625	3
Penn State	5	1952	1973	8	10	.444	0
Pepperdine	2	1979	1992	7	2	.778	1
Princeton	1	1951	1951	0	2	.000	0
Rice	7	1997	2008	10	13	.435	1
Rider	1	1967	1967	1	2	.333	0
Rollins	1	1954	1954	3	2	.600	0
Rutgers	1	1950	1950	3	2	.600	0
St. John's (NY)	6	1949	1980	6	12	.333	0
St. Louis	1	1965	1965	2	2	.500	0
San Jose State	1	2000	2000	0	2	.000	0
Santa Clara	1	1962	1962	4	2	.667	0
Seton Hall	4	1964	1975	2	8	.200	0
South Carolina	11	1975	2012	32	20	.615	2
Southern California	21	1948	2001	74	26	.740	12
Southern Illinois	5	1968	1977	12	10	.545	0
Southern Miss	1	2009	2009	0	2	.000	0
Springfield	2	1951	1955	1	4	.200	0
Stanford	19	1953	2023	41	31	.569	2
Stony Brook	1	2012	2012	0	2	.000	0
Syracuse	1	1961	1961	2	2	.500	0
TCU	6	2010	2023	11	10	.524	0
Temple	2	1972	1977	2	4	.333	0
Tennessee	7	1951	2024	14	13	.519	1
Texas	39	1949	2026	89	67	.571	6
Texas A&M	8	1951	2024	7	14	.333	0
Texas Tech	4	2014	2019	4	8	.333	0
UTRGV (Note: UTRGV, in full The University of Texas Rio Grande Valley, entered into full operation in 2015 following the merger of the University of Texas–Pan American (UTPA) and the University of Texas at Brownsville. UTRGV is credited with UTPA's College World Series appearance because the UTPA athletic program was directly transferred to the new institution.)	1	1971	1971	2	2	.500	0
Troy	1	2026	2026	1	2	.333	0
Tufts	1	1950	1950	1	2	.333	0
Tulane	2	2001	2005	2	4	.333	0
Tulsa	2	1969	1971	6	4	.600	0
UC Irvine	2	2007	2014	3	4	.429	0
UCLA	6	1969	2025	9	9	.500	1
UC Santa Barbara	1	2016	2016	1	2	.333	0
Utah	1	1951	1951	2	2	.500	0
Vanderbilt	5	2011	2021	20	10	.667	2
Virginia	7	2009	2024	13	14	.481	1
Wake Forest	3	1949	2023	9	5	.643	1
Washington	1	2018	2018	0	2	.000	0
Washington State	4	1950	1976	6	8	.429	0
West Virginia	1	2026	2026	2	2	.500	0
Western Michigan	6	1952	1963	9	12	.429	0
Wichita State	7	1982	1996	16	11	.593	1
Wisconsin	1	1950	1950	2	2	.500	0
Wyoming	1	1956	1956	1	2	.333	0
Yale	2	1947	1948	1	4	.200	0

== See also ==
- College World Series
- List of NCAA Division I baseball programs
