= John Ricker =

American baseball coach

Playing career

Football
- 1929–1931: Bowdoin
- Position: Back

Coaching career (HC unless noted)

Baseball
- 1947–1955: Tufts

Head coaching record
- Overall: 82–71
- Tournaments: NCAA: 1–2

John A. Ricker nicknamed Jit is an American former baseball coach. He played college football at Bowdoin College before enrolling the Navy. He then served as the head baseball coach of the Tufts Jumbos from 1947 to 1955, leading the Jumbos to a fifth-place finish in the 1950 College World Series.

In 1929, Ricker was a back for the Bowdoin Polar Bears football team.

In 1947, Ricker, a former naval commander, was named the head baseball coach at Tufts University.

In addition to coaching baseball at Tufts, Ricker also was a football coach at Medford High School in Massachusetts.

== Head coaching record ==
Record table
Season	Team	Overall	Conference	Standing	Postseason
Tufts Jumbos (Independent) (1947–1955)
1947	Tufts	12–2			
1948	Tufts	11–1			
1949	Tufts	10–7			
1950	Tufts	17–6			College World Series
1951	Tufts	5–10			
1952	Tufts	7–7			
1953	Tufts	6–9			
1954	Tufts	9–13			
1955	Tufts	5–13			
Tufts:		82–71			
Total:		82–71			
