= 1950 Alabama Crimson Tide baseball team =

1950 NCAA University of Alabama baseball team

1950 Alabama Crimson Tide baseball

SEC Regular Season District III Champions

College World Series, 4th
- Conference: Southeastern Conference
- Western
- Record: 23–12 (12–4 SEC)
- Head coach: Tilden Campbell (12th season)
- Home stadium: Sewell–Thomas Stadium

1950 Southeastern Conference baseball standings
	Conf.				Overall
Team	W		L	PCT	W		L	PCT
Eastern
Kentucky ^{x}‍‍‍	11	–	2	.846	16	–	7	.696
Georgia ‍‍‍	10	–	6	.625	18	–	10	.643
Tennessee ‍‍‍	7	–	9	.438	8	–	9	.471
Georgia Tech ‍‍‍	7	–	11	.389	7	–	11	.389
Auburn ‍‍‍	7	–	12	.368	12	–	13	.480
Vanderbilt ‍‍‍	4	–	13	.235	6	–	16	.273
Western
Alabama ^{x}‍‍‡‍^{y}	12	–	4	.750	23	–	12	.657
Mississippi State ‍‍‍	9	–	5	.643	13	–	6	.684
Florida ‍‍‍	5	–	3	.625	20	–	9	.690
Ole Miss ‍‍‍	5	–	5	.500	11	–	6	.647
LSU ‍‍‍	2	–	7	.222	5	–	9	.357
Tulane ‍‍‍	1	–	4	.200	4	–	9	.308
x – Division champion y – Invited to the College World Series; As of June 18, 1950; Rankings from Coaches' Poll

The 1950 Alabama Crimson Tide baseball team is a baseball team that represented the University of Alabama in the 1950 NCAA baseball season. The Crimson Tide were members of the Southeastern Conference and played their home games at Sewell–Thomas Stadium in Tuscaloosa, Alabama. They were led by twelfth-year head coach Tilden Campbell.

== Roster ==
1950 Alabama Crimson Tide baseball team
Players
Coaches

#	Pos.	Name	B/T	Height	Weight	Year	Home town
		Leon Adair	/	—	—	So
		Ralph Blalock	/	—	—
		Marv Blemker	/	—	—
	INF	Ned Folmar	/	—	—
	INF	George Howell	/	—	—
	P	Al Lary	R/R	6 ft 3 in (1.91 m)	185 lb (84 kg)		Northport, Alabama
	P	Frank Lary	R/R	5 ft 11 in (1.8 m)	175 lb (79 kg)		Northport, Alabama
	OF	Earl Martin	/	—	—
	INF	Mike Mizraney	/	—	—
		Tony Napoli	/	—	—
	OF	Ed White	R/R	6 ft 2 in (1.88 m)	200 lb (91 kg)	Sr	Anniston, Alabama
	P	Al Worthington	R/R	6 ft 2 in (1.88 m)	195 lb (88 kg)		Birmingham, Alabama

Head coach

Tilden Campbell

Assistant coach(es)

Legend

- (C) Team captain
- (S) Suspended
- (I) Ineligible
- Injured
- Current redshirt

== Schedule ==
1950 Alabama Crimson Tide baseball game log
Regular season
March (2–3)

#	Date	Opponent	Site/stadium	Score	Overall record	SEC record
1	March 20	at Stetson	Conrad Park • DeLand, Florida	2–3	0–1	–
2	March 21	at Stetson	Conrad Park • DeLand, Florida	10–5	1–1	–
3	March 23	at Rollins	Harper-Shepherd Field • Winter Park, Florida	4–8	1–2	–
4	March 24	at Rollins	Harper-Shepherd Field • Winter Park, Florida	1–2	1–3	–
5	March 25	at Rollins	Harper-Shepherd Field • Winter Park, Florida	10–4	2–3	–

April (9–4)

#	Date	Opponent	Site/stadium	Score	Overall record	SEC record
6	April 5	at Birmingham Barons	Rickwood Field • Birmingham, Alabama	5–23	2–4	–
7	April 7	at LSU	Alex Box Stadium • Baton Rouge, Louisiana	5–4	3–4	1–0
8	April 8	at LSU	Alex Box Stadium • Baton Rouge, Louisiana	5–3	4–4	2–0
9	April 11	Birmingham Barons	Sewell–Thomas Stadium • Tuscaloosa, Alabama	5–24	4–5	2–0
10	April 12	Andalusia	Sewell–Thomas Stadium • Tuscaloosa, Alabama	24–10	5–5	2–0
11	April 14	LSU	Sewell–Thomas Stadium • Tuscaloosa, Alabama	5–3	6–5	3–0
12	April 15	LSU	Sewell–Thomas Stadium • Tuscaloosa, Alabama	13–11	7–5	4–0
13	April 17	Ole Miss	Sewell–Thomas Stadium • Tuscaloosa, Alabama	3–15	7–6	4–1
14	April 18	Ole Miss	Sewell–Thomas Stadium • Tuscaloosa, Alabama	9–0	8–6	5–1
15	April 21	Mississippi State	Sewell–Thomas Stadium • Tuscaloosa, Alabama	6–3	9–6	6–1
16	April 22	Mississippi State	Sewell–Thomas Stadium • Tuscaloosa, Alabama	0–1	9–7	6–2
17	April 28	Florida	Sewell–Thomas Stadium • Tuscaloosa, Alabama	7–2	10–7	7–2
18	April 29	Florida	Sewell–Thomas Stadium • Tuscaloosa, Alabama	3–2	11–7	8–2

May (5–2)

#	Date	Opponent	Site/stadium	Score	Overall record	SEC record
19	May 2	at Auburn	Plainsman Park • Auburn, Alabama	17–1	12–7	9–2
20	May 3	at Auburn	Plainsman Park • Auburn, Alabama	17–0	13–7	10–2
21	May 4	Ole Miss	Sewell–Thomas Stadium • Tuscaloosa, Alabama	15–1	14–7	11–2
22	May 5	Ole Miss	Sewell–Thomas Stadium • Tuscaloosa, Alabama	1–6	14–8	11–3
23	May 13	Auburn	Sewell–Thomas Stadium • Tuscaloosa, Alabama	9–7	15–8	12–3
24	May 15	at Mississippi State	Unknown • Starkville, Mississippi	11–5	16–8	13–3
25	May 16	at Mississippi State	Unknown • Starkville, Mississippi	4–5	16–9	13–4

Postseason
SEC Playoff (3–1)

#	Date	Opponent	Site/stadium	Score	Overall record	SEC record
26	May 23	Kentucky	Sewell–Thomas Stadium • Tuscaloosa, Alabama	4–1	17–9	13–4
27	May 24	Kentucky	Sewell–Thomas Stadium • Tuscaloosa, Alabama	13–0	18–9	13–4
28	May 26	at Kentucky	Unknown • Lexington, Kentucky	3–14	18–10	13–4
29	May 27	at Kentucky	Unknown • Lexington, Kentucky	9–1	19–10	13–4

District III Playoff (3–0)

#	Date	Opponent	Site/stadium	Score	Overall record	SEC record
30	June 8	vs Clemson	Sims Legion Park • Gastonia, North Carolina	6–1	20–10	13–4
31	June 9	vs Wake Forest	Sims Legion Park • Gastonia, North Carolina	3–2	21–10	13–4
32	June 10	vs Wake Forest	Sims Legion Park • Gastonia, North Carolina	5–4	22–10	13–4

1950 College World Series (1–2)

#	Date	Opponent	Site/stadium	Score	Overall record	SEC record
33	June 16	vs Bradley	Johnny Rosenblatt Stadium • Omaha, Nebraska	9–2	23–10	13–4
34	June 18	vs Washington State	Johnny Rosenblatt Stadium • Omaha, Nebraska	1–9	23–11	13–4
35	June 19	vs Wisconsin	Johnny Rosenblatt Stadium • Omaha, Nebraska	1–3	23–12	13–4

== Awards and honors ==
Ned Folmar

- District III All-Tournament Team

Al Lary

- District III All-Tournament Team

Frank Lary

- ABCA All-South Region Team

Mike Mizraney

- District III All-Tournament Team

Ed White

- ABCA First Team All-American
- ABCA All-South Region Team
- District III All-Tournament Team
