= Jerry Tuttle =

Jerry Tuttle may refer to:

- Jerry Tuttle (American football) (1926–2006), American football quarterback
- Jerry O. Tuttle (1934–2018), United States Navy admiral
