= 1950 Washington State Cougars baseball team =

American college baseball season

1950 Washington State Cougars baseball

PCC North Champions District VI Champions

College World Series, Runner-Up
- Conference: Pacific Coast Conference
- North

Ranking
- Coaches: No. 2
- CB: No. 2
- Record: 32–6 (12–2 PCC)
- Head coach: Buck Bailey (24th season)
- Home stadium: Bailey Field

1950 Pacific Coast Conference baseball standings
	Conf.				Overall
Team	W		L	PCT	W		L	PCT
North Division
Washington State ‍†‍‍^{y}	12	–	2	.857	32	–	6	.842
Washington ‍‍‍	9	–	6	.600	9	–	6	.600
Oregon ‍‍‍	6	–	10	.375		–		–
Oregon State ‍‍‍	5	–	9	.357	7	–	12	.368
Idaho ‍‍‍	5	–	10	.333		–		–
California Intercollegiate Baseball Association
Stanford ‍‍‍	10	–	5	.667	19	–	15	.559
California ‍‍‍	8	–	6	.571	24	–	13	.649
Santa Clara ‍‍‍	8	–	7	.533		–		–
Southern California ‍‍‍	8	–	7	.533	16	–	8	.667
St. Mary's ‍‍‍	5	–	9	.357		–		–
UCLA ‍‍‍	5	–	10	.333	19	–	21	.475
† – Conference champion y – Invited to the NCAA tournament

The 1950 Washington State Cougars team represented Washington State University in the 1950 NCAA baseball season. The Cougars played their home games at Bailey Field. The team was coached by Buck Bailey in his 24th season at Washington State.

The Cougars finished second in the College World Series, defeated by the Texas Longhorns in the championship game.

== Roster ==
1950 Washington State Cougars roster
Pitchers: 5 Gene Conley; Lee Dolquist; Russ Foster; Sonny Galloway; Rod Keogh	Catchers: Clayton Carr; Infielders: Gene Camp; Terry Carroll; Ed Coleman; Don Paul; Ted Tappe	Outfielders: Bud Boyts; Gordy Brunswick; Bob McGuire; Frank Watson

== Schedule and results ==
Legend
Washington State win
Washington State loss
Washington State tie

1950 Washington State baseball game log

Regular season (27–4)
Date	Opponent	Score	Overall record	PCC Record
	NICE	W 7–0	1–0	
	NICE	W 8–3	2–0	
	NICE	W 5–2	3–0	
	Whitman	L 0–2	3–1	
	Whitman	L 3–5	3–2	
	Whitman	W 10–3	4–2	
	Whitman	W 5–0	5–2	
	Great Falls	W 6–0	6–2	
	Idaho	W 12–0	7–2	
	Spokane Indians	W 18–0	8–2	
	NICE	W 9–4	9–2	
	Whitman	W 15–0	10–2	
	Whitman	W 12–5	11–2	
	Whitman	W 4–0	12–2	
	Montana	W 21–9	13–2	
	Montana	W 12–2	14–2	
	NICE	W 16–8	15–2	
	Washington	W 7–4	16–2	1–0
	Washington	L 3–5	16–3	1–1
	Washington	W 5–3	17–3	2–1
	Washington	W 10–9	18–3	3–1
	Idaho	W 7–2	19–3	4–1
	Idaho	W 13–1	20–3	5–1
	Idaho	W 9–1	21–3	6–1
	Idaho	W 9–6	22–3	7–1
	Oregon	W 9–6	23–3	8–1
	Oregon	W 5–4	24–3	9–1
	Oregon	W 5–2	25–3	10–1
	Oregon	L 4–6	25–4	10–2
	Oregon State	W 8–1	26–4	11–2
	Oregon State	W 4–1	27–4	12–2

Postseason (5–2)

PCC Championship Sereies (2–0)
Date	Opponent	Score	Overall record	PCC Record
	Stanford	W 3–2	28–4	12–2
	Stanford	W 6–5	29–4	12–2

1950 College World Series (3–2)
Date	Opponent	Site/stadium	Score	Overall record	PCC Record
June 16	vs Tufts	Omaha Municipal Stadium • Omaha, Nebraska	W 3–1	30–4	12–2
June 17	vs Alabama	Omaha Municipal Stadium • Omaha, Nebraska	W 9–1	31–4	12–2
June 19	vs Rutgers	Omaha Municipal Stadium • Omaha, Nebraska	W 3–1	32–4	12–2
June 20	vs Texas	Omaha Municipal Stadium • Omaha, Nebraska	L 1–12	32–5	12–2
June 16	vs Texas	Omaha Municipal Stadium • Omaha, Nebraska	L 0–3	32–6	12–2

Schedule source:

== Awards and honors ==
Gordy Brunswick

- First Team All-Pacific Coast Conference

Lee Dolquist

- First Team All-Pacific Coast Conference

Bob McGuire

- First Team All-Pacific Coast Conference

Don Paul

- First Team All-Pacific Coast Conference
