= 1950 Colorado A&M Aggies baseball team =

American college baseball season

1950 Colorado A&M Aggies baseball

District VII champions

College World Series, T-7th
- Conference: Skyline Conference
- Record: 17–4 ( Skyline)
- Head coach: Mark Duncan (3rd season)
- Home stadium: Colorado Field

The 1950 Colorado A&M Aggies baseball team is a baseball team that represented Colorado State College of Agriculture and Mechanic Arts in the 1950 NCAA baseball season. They were members of the Skyline Conference and were led by third-year head coach Mark Duncan.

Don "Lefty" Straub set a single season school record with 102 strikeouts thrown.

== Roster ==
1950 Colorado A&M Aggies baseball team
Players
Coaches

#	Pos.	Name	B/T	Height	Weight	Year	Home town
		Jim Randall	/	—	—
	INF	Jim Ranson	/	—	—
	LHP	Don Straub	R/L	6 ft 1 in (1.85 m)	185 lb (84 kg)		Pittsburgh, Pennsylvania

Head coach

Mark Duncan

Assistant coach(es)

Legend

- (C) Team captain
- (S) Suspended
- (I) Ineligible
- Injured
- Current redshirt

== Schedule ==
1950 Colorado A&M Aggies baseball game log
Regular season
Regular season (15–2)

#	Date	Opponent	Site/stadium	Score	Overall record
		vs Colorado State College	Unknown • Unknown	3–1	–
		vs Colorado State College	Unknown • Unknown	4–1	–
		vs Colorado State College	Unknown • Unknown	11–1	–

Postseason
District 7 Tournament (2–0)

#	Date	Opponent	Site/stadium	Score	Overall record
18	June	vs Colorado State College	Unknown • Unknown	8–2	16–2
19	June	vs Colorado State College	Unknown • Unknown	9–5	17–2

1950 College World Series (0–2)

#	Date	Opponent	Site/stadium	Score	Overall record
20	June 15	vs Wisconsin	Omaha Municipal Stadium • Omaha, Nebraska	3–7	17–3
21	June 18	vs Texas	Omaha Municipal Stadium • Omaha, Nebraska	1–3	17–4
