= 1950 Rutgers Scarlet Knights baseball team =

American college baseball season

1950 Rutgers Scarlet Knights baseball

College World Series, 3rd
- Conference: Independent
- Record: 20–6–1
- Head coach: George Case (1st season)

The 1950 Rutgers Scarlet Knights baseball team is a baseball team that represented Rutgers University in the 1950 NCAA baseball season. They were led by first-year head coach George Case.

The Scarlet Knights finished third in the College World Series, defeated by the Texas Longhorns. It is the program's only team to reach the College World Series.

One player from the team, Harding Peterson, played in Major League Baseball. He was later the general manager of the Pittsburgh Pirates. Peterson, Ray van Cleef, and Jim Monahan were inducted into the Scarlet Knights Hall of Fame.

== Roster ==
1950 Rutgers Scarlet Knights baseball team
Players
Coaches

#	Pos.	Name	B/T	Height	Weight	Year	Home town
		Don Biehn	/	—	—
		Jim Clark	/	—	—
		Dudley Eppel	/	—	—
	P	Tom Foster	/	—	—
	P	Herm Hering	/	—	—
	INF	Steve Kalapos	/	—	—
		George Kaye	/	—	—
	INF	Julie Leboff	/	—	—		Elizabeth, New Jersey
		Tex Maskelevich	/	—	—
		Ted McDonough	/	—	—
		Jim Monahan	/	—	—
	C	Pete Peterson	R/R	6 ft 0 in (1.83 m)	205 lb (93 kg)		Perth Amboy, New Jersey
	INF	Charlie Ruddock	R/R	5 ft 10 in (1.78 m)	180 lb (82 kg)		Swampscott, Massachusetts
		George Ruddy	/	—	—
		Alan Stull	/	—	—
	INF	Bob Suba	/	—	—
		Hal Tindall	/	—	—
	OF	Ray Van Cleef	/	—	—
	P	Allen Willenbrock	/	—	—

Head coach

George Case

Assistant coach(es)

Legend

- (C) Team captain
- (S) Suspended
- (I) Ineligible
- Injured
- Current redshirt

== Schedule ==
1950 Rutgers Scarlet Knights baseball game log
Regular season
March (2–1–1)

#	Date	Opponent	Site/stadium	Score	Overall record
1	March 27	at Maryland	Unknown • College Park, Maryland	10–0	1–0
2	March 28	at Maryland	Unknown • College Park, Maryland	7–10	1–1
3	March 29	at Virginia	Unknown • Charlottesville, Virginia	3–2	2–1
4	March 31	at Washington and Lee	Unknown • Lexington, Virginia	6–6	2–1–1

April (8–1)

#	Date	Opponent	Site/stadium	Score	Overall record
5	April 1	at George Washington	Unknown • Washington, D.C.	4–3	3–1–1
6	April 8	Navy	Unknown • Piscataway, New Jersey	11–5	4–1–1
7	April 10	at Georgetown	Unknown • Washington, D.C.	4–3	5–1–1
8	April 12	Columbia	Unknown • Piscataway, New Jersey	11–4	6–1–1
9	April 15	at Penn State	Unknown • State College, Pennsylvania	6–3	7–1–1
10	April 19	Lehigh	Unknown • Piscataway, New Jersey	15–0	8–1–1
11	April 21	Colgate	Unknown • Piscataway, New Jersey	6–7	8–2–1
12	April 22	Princeton	Unknown • Piscataway, New Jersey	12–5	9–2–1
13	April 29	Lafayette	Unknown • Piscataway, New Jersey	14–12	10–2–1

May (6–1)

#	Date	Opponent	Site/stadium	Score	Overall record
14	May 4	at Fordham	Unknown • New York, New York	10–2	11–2–1
15	May 6	Amherst	Unknown • Piscataway, New Jersey	12–0	12–2–1
16	May 8	Temple	Unknown • Piscataway, New Jersey	11–5	13–2–1
17	May 10	Villanova	Unknown • Piscataway, New Jersey	12–2	14–2–1
18	May 17	at Lehigh	Unknown • Bethlehem, Pennsylvania	17–4	15–2–1
19	May 20	Lafayette	Unknown • Piscataway, New Jersey	9–8	16–2–1
20	May 27	at Princeton	Unknown • Princeton, New Jersey	2–3	16–3–1

June (1–1)

#	Date	Opponent	Site/stadium	Score	Overall record
21	June 5	Seton Hall	Unknown • Piscataway, New Jersey	3–13	16–4–1
22	June 10	Virginia	Unknown • Piscataway, New Jersey	10–8	17–4–1

Postseason
1950 College World Series (3–2)

#	Date	Opponent	Site/stadium	Score	Overall record
23	June 15	vs Texas	Johnny Rosenblatt Stadium • Omaha, Nebraska	4–2	18–4–1
24	June 17	vs Wisconsin	Johnny Rosenblatt Stadium • Omaha, Nebraska	5–3	19–4–1
25	June 19	vs Washington State	Johnny Rosenblatt Stadium • Omaha, Nebraska	1–3	19–5–1
26	June 21	vs Wisconsin	Johnny Rosenblatt Stadium • Omaha, Nebraska	16–2	20–5–1
27	June 22	vs Texas	Johnny Rosenblatt Stadium • Omaha, Nebraska	9–15	20–6–1
