= Tittle (surname) =

Tittle is a surname. Notable people with the surname include:

- Ian Tittle (born 1973), West Indian cricket player
- LaDonna Tittle (born 1946), American radio personality, model and actress
- Minnie Tittle (1875–1974) American actress, better known under her stage name of Minnie Tittell Brune
- Steve Tittle (born 1935), Canadian composer and teacher
- Y. A. Tittle (1926–2017), American football quarterback

== See also ==
- Tottle, another surname
- Tuttle (surname), another surname
