= Tottle =

Tottle is a surname. Notable people with the surname include:

- Douglas Tottle (born 1944), Canadian trade union activist and journalist
- Gordon Tottle (1925–1987), American ice hockey player
- John Walter Tottle, a.k.a. Jack Tottle (born 1939), American bluegrass musician, singer, mandolin player, songwriter, music teacher, and author
- Paul Tottle (born 1958), Australian judge

== See also ==
- Tittle (surname), another surname
- Tuttle (surname), another surname
