= Buck Bailey =

American baseball coach (1896–1964)

Biographical details
- Born: June 2, 1896; San Saba, Texas, U.S.
- Died: October 28, 1964 (aged 68); Albuquerque, New Mexico, U.S.

Playing career

Baseball
- 1916–1917: Texas A&M
- 1920–1921: Texas A&M
- 1922–1923: Bethany (WV)

Football
- 1915–1916: Texas A&M
- 1919–1920: Texas A&M
- 1921–1922: Bethany (WV)

Coaching career (HC unless noted)

Baseball
- 1927–1942: Washington State
- 1946–1961: Washington State

Football
- 1926–?: Washington State (assistant)

Head coaching record
- Overall: 603–325–5
- Military career
- Allegiance: United States
- Branch: U.S. Army, U.S. Navy
- Service years: 1917–1919, 1943–1945
- Rank: Lieutenant
- Conflicts: World War I, World War II

Arthur Buckner Bailey (June 2, 1896 – October 28, 1964) was a college baseball head coach; he led the Washington State Cougars for 32 seasons, from 1927 through 1961, except for three seasons during World War II, and had an overall record of 603–325–5 (.649).

== Early years ==
Born in San Saba in central Texas, Bailey graduated from Eldorado High School in Eldorado. He played baseball and football at Texas A&M and served in the U.S. Army during the First World War. Following the war, he returned to Texas A&M and then attended Bethany College in West Virginia. After college, he went to California, where he coached high school football and played on semi-pro and club teams, including the Olympic Club in San Francisco, where he met Babe Hollingbery.

== Washington State ==
When Hollingbery was hired as head football coach at Washington State, Bailey followed him north to Pullman as an assistant, and also headed the baseball program.

In Bailey's first season as head baseball coach in 1927, the Cougar nine finished first in the Pacific Coast Conference North Division and won the PCC Tournament. The team also won the North Division title in 1933, 1936, and 1938. While he served in the U.S. Navy during World War II, basketball coach Jack Friel was the interim baseball coach from 1943 through 1945.

Bailey's Cougar baseball teams won 14 conference titles (twelve PCC North Division and two AAWU), and went to the College World Series in 1950 and 1956. The 1950 team was runner-up to Texas in the fourth CWS, the first played in Omaha. The Cougars also made the NCAA tournament in his final two seasons of 1960 and 1961; he retired at age 65.

The Cougar baseball field, at the site of today's Mooberry track, was named for Bailey in 1950 on May 13, preceding the Cougars' runner-up finish in Omaha. Bailey–Brayton Field, the Cougars' home stadium since 1980, was also named for Bailey and later added the name of his successor, Chuck "Bobo" Brayton, in 2000. Brayton played shortstop for Bailey after the war and was the school's first baseball All-American, in 1947. He succeeded Bailey after the 1961 season and led WSU for 33 years.

During his first stint with the Cougars before the war, Bailey had a friendly rivalry with Tubby Graves (1886–1960) of rival Washington; Nine years older, Graves was one of his coaches at Texas A&M; he stepped down as head coach of the Huskies in 1946 and continued in the UW athletic department as a special assistant until his death.

== Death ==
Three years after his retirement, Bailey and his wife Frances were killed in an automobile collision in New Mexico in October 1964.
