= 1950 Tufts Jumbos baseball team =

American college baseball season

1950 Tufts Jumbos baseball

College World Series
- Conference: Independent
- Record: 17–6
- Head coach: John Ricker (4th season)
- Captain: George Minot

The 1950 Tufts Jumbos baseball team represented the Tufts University in the 1950 NCAA baseball season. The team was coached by John Ricker in his 4th season at Tufts.

The Jumbos reached the College World Series, but were eliminated by the Texas Longhorns in the quarterfinals, where they were no-hit by Jim Ehrler.

== Roster ==
1950 Tufts Jumbos roster
Pitchers: Arnie Castagner; Dave Lincoln; Bud Niles	Infielders: Al Bennett; Bill Burns; Ken Fettig; George Minot; Ed Schluntz; Al Thomann; Catchers: Jim Jabbour; Richard Littlefield	Outfielders: Rudy Fobert - Senior; John Lowe; John Panagos; Unknown: Al Boyages; Ellis Davis; Julie Doliner; Bill Mullin; Howie Richardson; Bob Taft; Don West; Ray Wilson; Coaches: John Ricker - 4th Season

== Schedule ==
Legend
Tufts win
Tufts loss

1950 Tufts Jumbos baseball game log
Regular season (16–4)

April
Date	Opponent	Site/stadium	Score	Overall record
Apr 3	at Upsala	East Orange, NJ	W 14–5	1–0
Apr 4	at Seton Hall	Owen T. Carroll Field • South Orange, NJ	L 2–12	1–1
Apr 6	at Princeton	Princeton, NJ	W 5–2^{10}	2–1
Apr 15	at Lowell Textile	Lowell, MA	W 13–3	3–1
Apr 18	Quonset Point	Medford, MA	W 7–6^{10}	4–1
Apr 22	AIC	Medford, MA	W 8–1	5–1
Apr 25	at Bates	Lewiston, ME	L 1–4	5–2

May/June
Date	Opponent	Site/stadium	Score	Overall record
May 3	at MIT	Cambridge, MA	W 4–3^{10}	6–2
May 6	Boston University	Medford, MA	L 2–3	6–3
May 6	Boston University	Medford, MA	L 1–6	6–4
May 9	Northeastern	Medford, MA	W 4–2	7–4
May 11	at Quonset Point	North Kingston, RI	W 23–2	8–4
May 13	Trinity	Medford, MA	W 10–0	9–4
May 15	Suffolk	Medford, MA	W 9–6	10–4
May 17	WPI	Medford, MA	W 14–0	11–4
May 20	UMass	Medford, MA	W 9–8	12–4
May 22	Williams	Medford, MA	W 7–2	13–4
May 27	Connecticut	Medford, MA	W 5–2	14–4
June 3	at Boston College	Chestnut Hill, MA	W 9–8^{11}	15–4
June 10	Boston College	Medford, MA	W 9–4	16–4

Postseason

1950 College World Series (1–2)
Date	Opponent	Site/stadium	Score	Overall record	CWS record
June 16	vs Washington State	Johnny Rosenblatt Stadium • Omaha, NE	L 1–3	16–5	0–1
June 18	vs Bradley	Johnny Rosenblatt Stadium • Omaha, NE	W 4–1	17–5	1–1
June 19	vs Texas	Johnny Rosenblatt Stadium • Omaha, NE	L 0–7	17–6	1–2
