= William Tuttle =

William Tuttle may refer to:

- William E. Tuttle Jr. (1870–1923), U.S. Representative from New Jersey
- William G. T. Tuttle Jr. (1935–2020), retired U.S. Army general
- William J. Tuttle (1912–2007), American make-up artist
- William Jeremiah Bill Tuttle (1882–1930), American Olympic freestyle swimmer and water polo player
- William M. Tuttle Jr. (born 1937), American author and historian
- William P. Tuttle (1847–1924), financier and entrepreneur

== See also ==
- Bill Tuttle, American professional baseball player
