= 1950 Wisconsin Badgers baseball team =

American college baseball season

1950 Wisconsin Badgers baseball

Big Nine regular season champion

College World Series, 4th
- Conference: Big Nine Conference
- Record: 19–9 (9–3 Big Nine)
- Head coach: Arthur Mansfield (11th season)
- Assistant coach: Fritz Wegner
- MVP: Gene Evans
- Captain: Gene Evans
- Home stadium: Guy Lowman Field

1950 Big Nine Conference baseball standings
	Conf.				Overall
Team	W		L	PCT	W		L	PCT
Wisconsin ‍†‍‍	9	–	3	.750	19	–	9	.679
Michigan ‍†‍‍	9	–	3	.750	18	–	9	.667
Iowa ‍‍‍	8	–	3	.727	19	–	6	.760
Illinois ‍‍‍	6	–	5	.545	13	–	6	.684
Ohio State ‍‍‍	6	–	5	.545	17	–	12	.586
Indiana ‍‍‍	4	–	4	.500	11	–	12	.478
Northwestern ‍‍‍	4	–	6	.400	14	–	7	.667
Purdue ‍‍‍	2	–	8	.200	12	–	14	.462
Minnesota ‍‍‍	1	–	8	.111	11	–	17	.393
As of June 16, 1950; Rankings from D1Baseball

The 1950 Wisconsin Badgers baseball team is a baseball team that represented the University of Wisconsin in the 1950 NCAA baseball season. The Badgers were members of the Big Nine Conference and played their home games at Guy Lowman Field in Madison, Wisconsin. They were led by eleventh-year head coach Arthur Mansfield.

== Roster ==
1950 Wisconsin Badgers baseball team
Players
Coaches

#	Pos.	Name	B/T	Height	Weight	Year	Home town
	INF	Ernie Bauer	/	—	—
		Glenn Christiansen	/	—	—
		Bruce Elliott	/	—	—	Sr
	INF	Gene Evans	R/R	5 ft 8 in (1.73 m)	165 lb (75 kg)	Sr	Shawano, Wisconsin
	INF	Shelley Fink	/R	—	—	Jr
	OF	Paul Furseth	/	—	—
		Mel Gaestel	R/R	5 ft 10 in (1.78 m)	—	So	Manitowoc, Wisconsin
		Ed Keating	/	—	—
	RHP	Thornton Kipper	R/R	6 ft 3 in (1.91 m)	190 lb (86 kg)	Sr	Bagley, Wisconsin
		Ray Lenahan	/	—	—
		Harlan Quandt	/	—	—
		Gene Radke	/	—	—
		John Schnurr	/	—	—
	INF	Bob Shea	/	—	—
		John Tennant	/	—	—
	C	Red Wilson	R/R	6 ft 0 in (1.83 m)	200 lb (91 kg)	Sr	Milwaukee, Wisconsin

Head coach

Arthur Mansfield

Assistant coach(es)

Fritz Wegner

Legend

- (C) Team captain
- (S) Suspended
- (I) Ineligible
- Injured
- Current redshirt

== Schedule ==
1950 Wisconsin Badgers baseball game log
Regular season
April (7–3)

#	Date	Opponent	Site/stadium	Score	Overall record	Big Nine record
1	April 1	at Bradley	Unknown • Peoria, Illinois	7–8	0–1	–
2	April 1	at Bradley	Unknown • Peoria, Illinois	10–5	1–1	–
3	April	vs Western Michigan	Unknown • Unknown	7–5	2–1	–
4	April	vs Akron	Unknown • Unknown	8–1	3–1	–
5	April	vs Ohio	Unknown • Unknown	1–7	3–2	–
6	April 21	Ohio State	Guy Lowman Field • Madison, Wisconsin	11–5	4–2	1–0
7	April 22	Ohio State	Guy Lowman Field • Madison, Wisconsin	7–9	4–3	1–1
8	April	vs Northwestern	Unknown • Unknown	13–6	5–3	2–1
9	April	vs Northwestern	Unknown • Unknown	4–2	6–3	3–1
10	April	vs Appleton Papermakers	Unknown • Unknown	19–5	7–3	3–1

May (8–4)

#	Date	Opponent	Site/stadium	Score	Overall record	Big Nine record
11	May 5	at Purdue	Lambert Field • West Lafayette, Indiana	5–0	8–3	4–1
12	May 6	at Purdue	Lambert Field • West Lafayette, Indiana	1–6	8–4	4–2
13	May 10	Notre Dame	Guy Lowman Field • Madison, Wisconsin	5–10	8–5	4–2
14	May 11	Notre Dame	Guy Lowman Field • Madison, Wisconsin	5–14	8–6	4–2
15	May	vs Iowa	Unknown • Unknown	6–5	9–6	5–2
16	May	vs Iowa	Unknown • Unknown	4–9	9–7	5–3
17	May 19	vs Michigan	Unknown • Unknown	4–3	10–7	6–3
18	May 20	vs Michigan	Unknown • Unknown	7–6	11–7	7–3
19	May 22	Bradley	Guy Lowman Field • Madison, Wisconsin	6–4	12–7	7–3
20	May 25	vs Winona Teachers	Unknown • Unknown	13–7	13–7	7–3
21	May	vs Minnesota	Unknown • Unknown	9–8	14–7	8–3
22	May	vs Minnesota	Unknown • Unknown	2–0	15–7	9–3

June (2–0)

#	Date	Opponent	Site/stadium	Score	Overall record	Big Nine record
23	June 8	at Michigan State	Old College Field • East Lansing, Michigan	13–6	16–7	9–3
24	June	vs Ohio	Unknown • Unknown	4–1	17–7	9–3

Postseason
1950 College World Series (2–2)

#	Date	Opponent	Site/stadium	Score	Overall record	Big Nine record
25	June 15	vs Colorado A&M	Johnny Rosenblatt Stadium • Omaha, Nebraska	7–3	18–7	9–3
26	June 17	vs Rutgers	Johnny Rosenblatt Stadium • Omaha, Nebraska	3–5	18–8	9–3
27	June 20	vs Alabama	Johnny Rosenblatt Stadium • Omaha, Nebraska	3–1	19–8	9–3
28	June 21	vs Rutgers	Johnny Rosenblatt Stadium • Omaha, Nebraska	2–13	19–9	9–3

== Awards and honors ==
Thornton Kipper

- District IV All Star
- Second Team All-American

Red Wilson

- Third Team All-American
