= Dick Risenhoover =

American journalist

- Born: William Ervin Risenhoover Jr. February 15, 1927; Childress, Texas, U.S.
- Died: April 8, 1978 (aged 51); Arlington, Texas, U.S.
- Sports commentary career
- Team: Texas Rangers (1972–1977)
- Genre: Play-by-play
- Sport: Major League Baseball

William Ervin "Dick" Risenhoover Jr. (February 15, 1927 – April 8, 1978) was an American sportscaster for the Texas Rangers from 1972 to 1977.

== Early life, education and army service ==
He attended Childress High School. He served in the United States Army from July 1945 to January 1947, where he played on the baseball team for Fort MacArthur, California. He played baseball and basketball at the University of Texas at Austin, where he graduated in 1950 and was on the 1950 Texas Longhorns baseball team. He died of liver cancer at the age of 51. He was famous for his tagline, "Bye bye baseball" whenever the Rangers hit a home run, which, with slugger like Jeff Burroughs and Frank Howard on the team, was a frequent occurrence.
