= 1950 Southern Conference baseball tournament =

- Teams: 4
- Format: Double-elimination tournament
- Finals site: Greensboro, North Carolina
- Champions: Wake Forest (1st title)

1950 Southern Conference baseball standings
	Conf.				Overall
Team	W		L	PCT	W		L	PCT
Northern
Virginia Tech ^{x}‍‍‍	8	–	2	.800	13	–	9	.591
George Washington ‍‍‍	6	–	3	.667		–		–
Maryland ‍‍‍	6	–	3	.667	20	–	8	.714
Washington and Lee ‍‍‍		–		–		–		–
Richmond ‍‍‍	0	–	0	–	8	–	9	.471
William & Mary ‍‍‍		–		–		–		–
VMI ‍‍‍		–		–		–		–
Southern
Wake Forest ^{x}‍‍‡‍	14	–	3	.824	31	–	6	.838
Clemson ‍‍‍	13	–	3	.813	20	–	11	.645
South Carolina ‍‍‍	11	–	6	.647	16	–	9	.640
NC State ‍‍‍		–		–		–		–
Furman ‍‍‍		–		–		–		–
North Carolina ‍‍‍	11	–	11	.500	16	–	18	.471
Duke ‍‍‍		–		–		–		–
Davidson ‍‍‍		–		–		–		–
The Citadel ‍‍‍	0	–	12	.000	4	–	14	.222
x – Division champion ‡ – Tournament champion As of June 30, 1950; Rankings from Collegiate Baseball

The 1950 Southern Conference baseball tournament was held in Greensboro, North Carolina, from May 26 through 28, as the conference's final event of the 1950 NCAA baseball season. This was the league's first baseball championship tournament, and predates modern Southern Conference baseball records which begin with the 1954 baseball season. The South Division's top seed Wake Forest won the tournament. Despite Wake Forest's win, Clemson participated in the District III Playoffs, falling in both games against Southeastern Conference foes.

The tournament used a double-elimination format.

== Seeding ==
The top two teams from each division participated in the tournament. Complete standings are not available, but the teams below all fielded baseball teams within the Southern Conference.

Team	W	L	Pct	GB	Seed
North Division
Virginia Tech	8	2	.800	–	1N
Maryland	6	3	.667	1.5	2N
George Washington	6	3	.667	1.5	–
Washington and Lee					–
Richmond					–
William & Mary					–
VMI					–
South Division
Wake Forest	14	3	.824	–	1S
Clemson	13	3	.813	0.5	2S
South Carolina	11	6	.647	3	–
North Carolina	11	11	.500	5.5	–
The Citadel	0	12	.000	11.5	–
NC State					–
Furman					–
Duke					–
Davidson					–

== Bracket ==
First round
1N	Virginia Tech	3
2N	Maryland	4
1S	Wake Forest	14
2S	Clemson	2
Lower round 1
1N	Virginia Tech	0
2S	Clemson	1

Semi-finals
1S	Wake Forest
2N	Maryland
Lower final
2N	Maryland	3
2S	Clemson	2

Finals
1S	Wake Forest	15	–
2N	Maryland	4	–
