= Senator Tuttle =

Senator Tuttle may refer to:

- Arthur J. Tuttle (1868–1944), Michigan State Senate
- John Tuttle (politician) (1951–2022), Maine State Senate
- Marcus Tuttle (1830–1884), Iowa State Senate
- Oral P. Tuttle (1889–1957), Illinois State Senate
