= Prentis Park =

- U.S. National Register of Historic Places
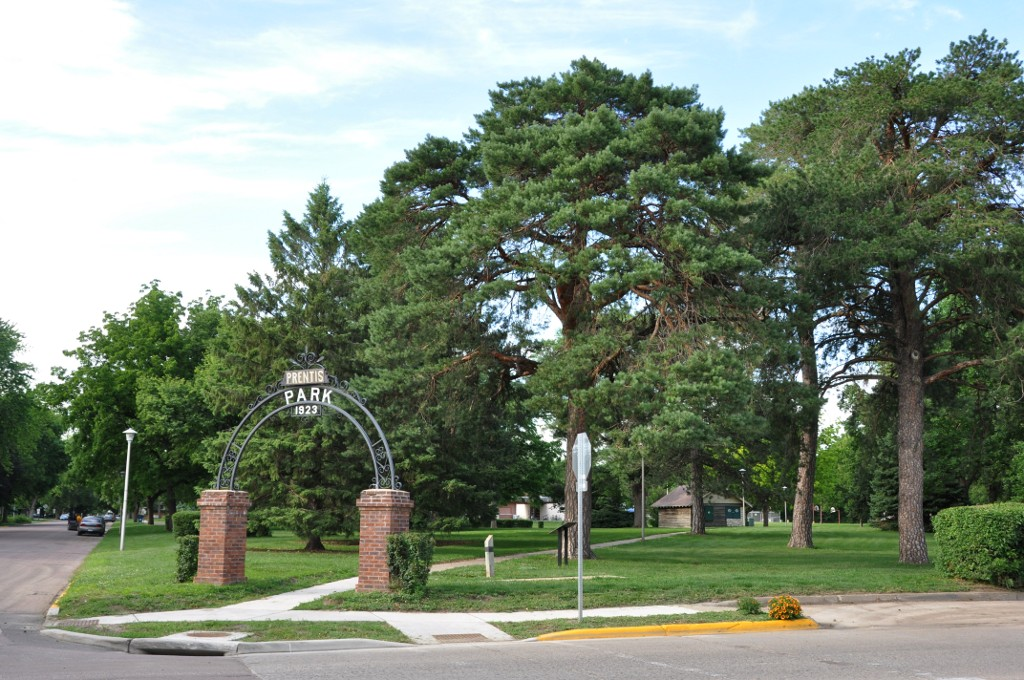
- Southwestern entrance of Prentis Park

- Location within South Dakota Location within the United States
- Location: Plum and Main Sts., Vermillion, South Dakota
- Coordinates: 42°46′53″N 96°55′05″W
- Area: 20 acres (8.1 ha)
- Built: 1923
- MPS: Federal Relief Construction in South Dakota MPS
- NRHP reference No.: 01001218
- Added to NRHP: November 8, 2001

Prentis Park is a city park in Vermillion, South Dakota. It is a rectangular 20-acre (8.1 ha) park located on the block bounded by Plum Street, Main Street, Clark Street, and Prentis Avenue. It was listed on the National Register of Historic Places in 2001.

== Facilities ==
Besides functioning as a public green space, Prentis Park also includes several buildings and facilities. These include a swimming pool, now called Prentis Plunge; and a baseball field, a horseshoe pit, volleyball courts, basketball courts, a disc golf course, a log cabin, picnic shelters, restrooms, a caretaker's house, maintenance buildings, and a water tower. Multiple events per year are held in the park, including by organizations at the University of South Dakota.

== History ==
The land that later became Prentis Park had been a homestead and apple orchard during the late 1800s. In 1923, 10 acres (4.0 ha) of this land was gifted to the City of Vermillion by Charles E. Prentis in memory of his late wife, with the intention that the city convert this land into a park in keeping with its ongoing beautification efforts. Prentis personally paid for a professional gardener to draw up plans for the park, which included a swimming pool, a bandshell, a picnic area, a playground, and an outdoor theater. In the summer of 1929, the swimming pool opened. An additional donation of 10 acres from Prentis expanded the park to its current size, on which a baseball diamond and football field were built.

After the Great Depression hit in the 1930s, the City of Vermillion became eligible for relief through the Works Progress Administration; Prentis Park became one of 107 South Dakota parks that were improved under the WPA. This program provided Prentis Park with landscaping and gardening services, as well as the funds to finally construct the bandshell and outdoor theater, as well as a pergola and grandstands for the sports fields. The pergola, completed in 1936, was removed in the 1950s. Millstones from the old gristmill at nearby Bloomingdale were added as decoration to the front of the bandstand, and construction on this structure was completed in 1937. A log cabin used by the local Girl Scout troop was built in 1933, and a horseshoe court and a basketball court were both added in the early 1940s. A metal water tower was constructed in 1959. The original swimming pool was replaced in 1965, and at this time, a bathhouse and pump station were also added.

The City of Vermillion submitted Prentis Park for induction into the National Register of Historic Places in 2000, "for its association with the Works Progress Administration and its landscape design". It was subsequently added to the NRHP on November 8, 2001.

In 2015, a new city tax on alcoholic malt beverages was implemented, and the city began using these proceeds to fund major renovations to Prentis Park. The swimming pool underwent major renovations, which added a lazy river, new slides, and new changing rooms; and by 2018, the baseball courts, disc golf course, horseshoe pit, and parking lots had been renovated, and other minor improvements were made.
