= 1950 Texas Longhorns baseball team =

American college baseball season

1950 Texas Longhorns baseball

National champions SWC champions
- Conference: Southwest Conference
- Record: 24-4 (14–1 SWC)
- Head coach: Bibb Falk (8th year)
- Home stadium: Clark Field

1950 Southwest Conference baseball standings
	Conf.				Overall
Team	W		L	PCT	W		L	PCT
Texas ‍†‍‍^{y}	14	–	1	.933	27	–	6	.818
Texas A&M ‍‍‍	9	–	5	.643	17	–	11	.607
Baylor ‍‍‍	8	–	7	.533	20	–	9	.690
TCU ‍‍‍	7	–	8	.467	14	–	9	.609
SMU ‍‍‍	2	–	10	.167	9	–	12	.429
Rice ‍‍‍	2	–	11	.154	9	–	12	.429
† – Conference champion y – Invited to the College World Series; As of June 30, 1950; Rankings from Collegiate Baseball

The 1950 Texas Longhorns baseball team represented the University of Texas in the 1950 NCAA baseball season. The Longhorns played their home games at Clark Field. The team was coached by Bibb Falk in his 8th season at Texas.

The Longhorns won the College World Series, defeating the Washington State Cougars in the championship game.

== Roster ==
1950 Texas Longhorns roster
Pitchers: James Ehrler; Charlie Gorin; Murray Wall; Catchers: Stuart Benson	Infielders: Eddie Burrows; Frank Kana; Kal Segrist; Ben Tompkins; Sigmund Waghalter	Outfielders: Rob Brock; Don Cavness; Guss Hrncir; Dick Risenhoover; Frank Womack

== Schedule ==
Legend
Texas win
Texas loss

1950 Texas Longhorns baseball game log
Regular season

March
Date	Opponent	Site/stadium	Score	Overall record	SWC record
March 22	Minnesota	Clark Field • Austin, TX	W 10–2	1–0	
March 23	Minnesota	Clark Field • Austin, TX	W 15–9	2–0	
March 24	Oklahoma	Clark Field • Austin, TX	W 5–0	3–0	
March 25	Oklahoma	Clark Field • Austin, TX	L 5–7	3–1	
March 29	TCU	Clark Field • Austin, TX	W 5–4	4–1	1–0
March 30	TCU	Clark Field • Austin, TX	W 5–4	5–1	2–0

April
Date	Opponent	Site/stadium	Score	Overall record	SWC record
April 3	SMU	Clark Field • Austin, TX	W 8–3	6–1	3–0
April 11	at Texas A&M	Kyle Baseball Field • College Station, TX	W 12–2	7–1	4–0
April 15	at Baylor	Ferrell Field • Waco, TX	L 1–2	7–2	4–1
April 21	at Rice	Houston, TX	W 2–0	8–2	5–1
April 22	at Rice	Houston, TX	W 8–5	9–2	6–1
April 28	Baylor	Clark Field • Austin, TX	W 22–3	10–2	7–1

May
Date	Opponent	Site/stadium	Score	Overall record	SWC record
May 3	Baylor	Clark Field • Austin, TX	W 22–1	11–2	8–1
May 5	at SMU	Armstrong Field • Dallas, TX	W 7–2	12–2	9–1
May 6	at SMU	Armstrong Field • Dallas, TX	W 10–2	13–2	10–1
May 8	at TCU	Fort Worth, TX	W 1–0	14–2	11–1
May 13	Rice	Clark Field • Austin, TX	W 5–0	15–2	12–1
May 17	Texas A&M	Clark Field • Austin, TX	W 5–0	16–2	13–1
May 18	Texas A&M	Clark Field • Austin, TX	W 6–5	17–2	14–1

Postseason

District 6 playoff
Date	Opponent	Site/stadium	Score	Overall record	Playoff record
June 6	Arizona	Clark Field • Austin, TX	L 2–6	17–3	0–1
June 7	Arizona	Clark Field • Austin, TX	W 9–8	18–3	1–1
June 8	Arizona	Clark Field • Austin, TX	W 7–3	19–3	2–1

College World Series
Date	Opponent	Site/stadium	Score	Overall record	CWS record
June 15	Rutgers	Omaha Municipal Stadium • Omaha, NE	L 2–4	19–4	0–1
June 18	Colorado A&M	Omaha Municipal Stadium • Omaha, NE	W 3–1	20–4	1–1
June 19	Tufts	Omaha Municipal Stadium • Omaha, NE	W 7–0	21–4	2–1
June 20	Washington State	Omaha Municipal Stadium • Omaha, NE	W 12–1	22–4	3–1
June 22	Rutgers	Omaha Municipal Stadium • Omaha, NE	W 15–9	23–4	4–1
June 23	Washington State	Omaha Municipal Stadium • Omaha, NE	W 3–0	24–4	5–1

== Awards and honors ==
Bob Brock

- First Team All-American

Charlie Gorin

- First Team All-American
- First Team All-SWC

Kal Segrist

- First Team All-SWC

Ben Tomkins

- First Team All-SWC

Murray Wall

- First Team All-American

Frank Womack

- First Team All-SWC
