= Judge Tuttle =

Judge Tuttle may refer to:

- Arthur J. Tuttle (1868–1944), judge of the United States District Court for the Eastern District of Michigan
- Elbert Tuttle (1897–1996), judge of the United States Court of Appeals for the Fifth Circuit
