= John Tuttle =

John Tuttle may refer to:

- John Tuttle (athlete) (born 1958), American long-distance runner
- John Tuttle (organist) (born 1946), Canadian-American organist and choral conductor
- John Tuttle (politician) (1951–2022), American politician
- John Tuttle (1616–1683), founder of the Tuttle Farm, one of the oldest family-owned farms in the United States - see Tendercrop Farm at the Red Barn
