= 1950 NCAA baseball season =

Baseball season

College World Series
- Duration: June 15–23, 1950
- Champions: Texas (2nd title)
- Runners-up: Washington State (1st CWS Appearance)
- Winning coach: Bibb Falk (2nd title)
- MOP: Ray VanCleef (Rutgers)

Seasons
- ← 1949 1951 →

The 1950 NCAA baseball season, play of college baseball in the United States organized by the National Collegiate Athletic Association (NCAA) began in the spring of 1950. The season progressed through the regular season and concluded with the 1950 College World Series. The College World Series, held for the fourth time in 1950, consisted of one team from each of eight geographical districts and was held for the first time in Omaha, Nebraska at Johnny Rosenblatt Stadium as a double-elimination tournament. Texas claimed their second championship.

== Conference changes ==
- Montana left the Pacific Coast Conference for the Mountain States Conference. The PCC played as a 9-team league.

== Conference winners ==
This is a partial list of conference champions from the 1950 season. Each of the eight geographical districts chose, by various methods, the team that would represent them in the NCAA Tournament. Conference champions had to be chosen, unless all conference champions declined the bid.

Conference	Regular season winner	Conference tournament	Tournament city	Tournament winner
Big Seven	Nebraska	No conference tournament		
Big Nine	Wisconsin; Michigan	No conference tournament		
CIBA	Stanford	No conference tournament		
EIBL	Army; Princeton	No conference tournament		
Gulf Coast Conference	Houston	No conference tournament		
Missouri Valley Conference	East - Bradley; West - Oklahoma A&M	1950 Missouri Valley Conference baseball tournament	Peoria, IL	Bradley
Pacific Coast Conference North	Washington State	No conference tournament		
Southeastern Conference	Alabama	No conference tournament		
Southern Conference	North - Virginia Tech; South - Wake Forest	1950 Southern Conference baseball tournament	Greensboro, NC	Wake Forest
Southwest Conference	Texas	No conference tournament		
Yankee Conference	Maine	No conference tournament		

== Conference standings ==
The following is an incomplete list of conference standings:

1950 Big Seven Conference baseball standings
	Conf.				Overall
Team	W		L	PCT	W		L	PCT
Nebraska ‍†‍‍^{y}	11	–	3	.786	16	–	8	.667
Missouri ‍‍‍	8	–	5	.615	11	–	9	.550
Oklahoma ‍‍‍	7	–	5	.583	14	–	8	.636
Kansas ‍‍‍	8	–	8	.500	10	–	8	.556
Iowa State ‍‍‍	4	–	5	.444		–		–
Colorado ‍‍‍	4	–	7	.364		–		–
Kansas State ‍‍‍	5	–	11	.313	7	–	13	.350
† – Conference champion y – Invited to the NCAA tournament As of June 30, 1950; Rankings from Collegiate Baseball

1950 Big Nine Conference baseball standings
	Conf.				Overall
Team	W		L	PCT	W		L	PCT
Wisconsin ‍†‍‍	9	–	3	.750	19	–	9	.679
Michigan ‍†‍‍	9	–	3	.750	18	–	9	.667
Iowa ‍‍‍	8	–	3	.727	19	–	6	.760
Illinois ‍‍‍	6	–	5	.545	13	–	6	.684
Ohio State ‍‍‍	6	–	5	.545	17	–	12	.586
Indiana ‍‍‍	4	–	4	.500	11	–	12	.478
Northwestern ‍‍‍	4	–	6	.400	14	–	7	.667
Purdue ‍‍‍	2	–	8	.200	12	–	14	.462
Minnesota ‍‍‍	1	–	8	.111	11	–	17	.393
As of June 16, 1950; Rankings from D1Baseball

1950 Eastern Intercollegiate Baseball League baseball standings
	Conf.						Overall
Team	W		L		T	PCT	W		L		T	PCT
Army ‍†‍‍	7	–	2	–	0	.778	14	–	4	–	0	.778
Princeton ‍†‍‍	7	–	2	–	0	.778	14	–	8	–	0	.636
Cornell ‍‍‍	6	–	2	–	0	.750	13	–	6	–	0	.684
Harvard ‍‍‍	5	–	2	–	0	.714	9	–	6	–	0	.600
Yale ‍‍‍	5	–	4	–	0	.556	14	–	13	–	0	.519
Navy ‍‍‍	3	–	6	–	0	.333	6	–	12	–	1	.342
Penn ‍‍‍	3	–	6	–	0	.333	10	–	12	–	0	.455
Brown ‍‍‍	2	–	5	–	0	.286	8	–	8	–	0	.500
Columbia ‍‍‍	2	–	6	–	0	.250	4	–	11	–	0	.267
Dartmouth ‍‍‍	1	–	6	–	0	.143	8	–	23	–	0	.258
† – Conference champion

1950 Missouri Valley Conference baseball standings
	Conf.						Overall
Team	W		L		T	PCT	W		L		T	PCT
East
Bradley ^{x}‍‍‡‍	5	–	0	–	0	1.000	17	–	15	–	1	.530
Saint Louis ‍‍‍	3	–	2	–	0	.600	0	–	0	–	0	–
Detroit ‍‍‍	1	–	3	–	0	.250	10	–	6	–	0	.625
Drake ‍‍‍	0	–	4	–	0	.000	0	–	0	–	0	–
West
Oklahoma A&M ^{x}‍‍‍	6	–	3	–	0	.667	15	–	7	–	0	.682
Tulsa ‍‍‍	3	–	3	–	0	.500	6	–	10	–	0	.375
Wichita State ‍‍‍	1	–	5	–	0	.167	4	–	14	–	0	.222
x – Division champion ‡ – Tournament champion As of June 30, 1950

1950 Pacific Coast Conference baseball standings
	Conf.				Overall
Team	W		L	PCT	W		L	PCT
North Division
Washington State ‍†‍‍^{y}	12	–	2	.857	32	–	6	.842
Washington ‍‍‍	9	–	6	.600	9	–	6	.600
Oregon ‍‍‍	6	–	10	.375		–		–
Oregon State ‍‍‍	5	–	9	.357	7	–	12	.368
Idaho ‍‍‍	5	–	10	.333		–		–
California Intercollegiate Baseball Association
Stanford ‍‍‍	10	–	5	.667	19	–	15	.559
California ‍‍‍	8	–	6	.571	24	–	13	.649
Santa Clara ‍‍‍	8	–	7	.533		–		–
Southern California ‍‍‍	8	–	7	.533	16	–	8	.667
St. Mary's ‍‍‍	5	–	9	.357		–		–
UCLA ‍‍‍	5	–	10	.333	19	–	21	.475
† – Conference champion y – Invited to the NCAA tournament

1950 Southeastern Conference baseball standings
	Conf.				Overall
Team	W		L	PCT	W		L	PCT
Eastern
Kentucky ^{x}‍‍‍	11	–	2	.846	16	–	7	.696
Georgia ‍‍‍	10	–	6	.625	18	–	10	.643
Tennessee ‍‍‍	7	–	9	.438	8	–	9	.471
Georgia Tech ‍‍‍	7	–	11	.389	7	–	11	.389
Auburn ‍‍‍	7	–	12	.368	12	–	13	.480
Vanderbilt ‍‍‍	4	–	13	.235	6	–	16	.273
Western
Alabama ^{x}‍‍‡‍^{y}	12	–	4	.750	23	–	12	.657
Mississippi State ‍‍‍	9	–	5	.643	13	–	6	.684
Florida ‍‍‍	5	–	3	.625	20	–	9	.690
Ole Miss ‍‍‍	5	–	5	.500	11	–	6	.647
LSU ‍‍‍	2	–	7	.222	5	–	9	.357
Tulane ‍‍‍	1	–	4	.200	4	–	9	.308
x – Division champion y – Invited to the College World Series; As of June 18, 1950; Rankings from Coaches' Poll

1950 Southern Conference baseball standings
	Conf.				Overall
Team	W		L	PCT	W		L	PCT
Northern
Virginia Tech ^{x}‍‍‍	8	–	2	.800	13	–	9	.591
George Washington ‍‍‍	6	–	3	.667		–		–
Maryland ‍‍‍	6	–	3	.667	20	–	8	.714
Washington and Lee ‍‍‍		–		–		–		–
Richmond ‍‍‍	0	–	0	–	8	–	9	.471
William & Mary ‍‍‍		–		–		–		–
VMI ‍‍‍		–		–		–		–
Southern
Wake Forest ^{x}‍‍‡‍	14	–	3	.824	31	–	6	.838
Clemson ‍‍‍	13	–	3	.813	20	–	11	.645
South Carolina ‍‍‍	11	–	6	.647	16	–	9	.640
NC State ‍‍‍		–		–		–		–
Furman ‍‍‍		–		–		–		–
North Carolina ‍‍‍	11	–	11	.500	16	–	18	.471
Duke ‍‍‍		–		–		–		–
Davidson ‍‍‍		–		–		–		–
The Citadel ‍‍‍	0	–	12	.000	4	–	14	.222
x – Division champion ‡ – Tournament champion As of June 30, 1950; Rankings from Collegiate Baseball

1950 Southwest Conference baseball standings
	Conf.				Overall
Team	W		L	PCT	W		L	PCT
Texas ‍†‍‍^{y}	14	–	1	.933	27	–	6	.818
Texas A&M ‍‍‍	9	–	5	.643	17	–	11	.607
Baylor ‍‍‍	8	–	7	.533	20	–	9	.690
TCU ‍‍‍	7	–	8	.467	14	–	9	.609
SMU ‍‍‍	2	–	10	.167	9	–	12	.429
Rice ‍‍‍	2	–	11	.154	9	–	12	.429
† – Conference champion y – Invited to the College World Series; As of June 30, 1950; Rankings from Collegiate Baseball

== College World Series ==
The 1950 season marked the fourth NCAA Baseball Tournament, which consisted of the eight team College World Series. For the first time, the College World Series was held in Omaha, Nebraska, which became the permanent home of the event. Districts used a variety of selection methods to the event, from playoffs to a selection committee. District playoffs were not considered part of the NCAA Tournament, and the expansion to eight teams resulted in the end of regionals as they existed from 1947 through 1949. The eight teams played a double-elimination format, with Texas claiming their second championship with a 3–0 win over Washington State in the final.

Upper round 1
Texas	2
Rutgers	4
Wisconsin	7
Colorado A&M	3
Alabama	9
Bradley	2
Washington State	3
Tufts	1

Upper round 2
Rutgers	5
Wisconsin	3
Alabama	1
Washington State	9
Lower round 1
Texas	3
Colorado A&M	1
Tufts	5
Bradley	4

Upper final
Rutgers	1
Washington State	3^{10}
Lower round 2
Wisconsin	3
Alabama	1
Texas	7
Tufts	0

Semifinals
Washington State	1
Texas	12
Wisconsin	2
Rutgers	16

Preliminary final
Texas	15
Rutgers	9

Final
Washington State	0
Texas	3
