= Mark Duncan (coach) =

American football player, coach, administrator, and basketball coach

Biographical details
- Born: c. 1919
- Died: July 1993

Playing career

Football
- 1937–1940: Denver

Basketball
- 1938–1939: Denver
- Position: Guard (football)

Coaching career (HC unless noted)

Football
- 1941: Colorado A&M (assistant)
- 1943: Denver
- 1947–1952: Colorado A&M (line)
- 1953–1954: Colorado A&M (backfield)
- 1955–1962: San Francisco 49ers (DB)

Basketball
- 1943: Denver (interim HC)

Baseball
- 1948–1955: Colorado A&M

Administrative career (AD unless noted)
- 1964–1967: NFL (supervisor of officials)
- 1968–1972: NFL (dir. personnel)
- 1973–1974: Los Angeles Rams (dir. player personnel)
- 1975–1978: Seattle Seahawks (asst. GM)

Head coaching record
- Overall: 2–5 (football); 8–6 (basketball); 68–60–1 (baseball)

Mark C. Duncan (c. 1919 – July 1993) was an American football player, coach, and administrator, and basketball coach. He served as the head football coach and the interim head basketball coach at the University of Denver in 1943.

Duncan later embarked on a career in the National Football League (NFL). He was an assistant coach for the San Francisco 49ers from 1955 to 1962.

In 1964, Duncan was named the NFL's supervisor of officials, and three years later, he was named the League's director of personnel. From 1973 to 1974, he was the director of player personnel for the Los Angeles Rams, and from 1975 to 1978, he served as an assistant general manager for the Seattle Seahawks.

Duncan died in July 1993 at the age of 75.

== Head coaching record ==
=== Football ===
| Year | Team | Overall | Conference | Standing |
|---|---|---|---|---|
Denver Pioneers (Mountain States Conference) (1943)
| 1943 | Denver | 2–5 | 0–0 | N/A |
| Denver: | | 2–5 | 0–0 | |
| Total: | | 2–5 | | |
