= Leo Schrall =

American college baseball coach (1907-1999)

Current position
- Title: Manager / Head coach

Biographical details
- Born: April 7, 1907; Cresson, Pennsylvania, U.S.
- Died: February 3, 1999 (aged 91); Peoria, Illinois, U.S.

Playing career
- 1927–1928: Notre Dame
- 1929: Peoria Tractors
- 1930: Decatur Commodores
- 1931: Jeannette Jays
- 1931: Altoona Engineers
- 1931: Beaver Falls Beavers
- 1932: Dubuque Tigers
- Position: Shortstop

Coaching career (HC unless noted)
- 1947–1949: Peoria Redwings
- 1949–1972: Bradley
- 1957–1959: Hastings Giants

Head coaching record
- Overall: 346–188–3

Accomplishments and honors

Awards
- Baseball Hall of Fame and Museum Display (1988); Greater Peoria Sports Hall of Fame Induction (1983)

Leo Schrall (April 7, 1907 – February 3, 1999) was an American infielder and manager in minor league baseball and a head coach in college baseball.

Born in Cresson, Pennsylvania, Schrall attended University of Notre Dame, where he enjoyed a successful career as three-sport student-athlete. He excelled at baseball, being considered by many critics as one of the premier shortstops in college baseball. Schrall was the regular shortstop for Notre Dame from 1927 to 1928, and started his professional baseball career after graduating in 1928.

Schrall played from 1929 through 1932 in the Three-I, Middle Atlantic and Mississippi Valley leagues, compiling a .252 batting average with six different teams in 324 games.

A highly successful head coach, he led the Bradley Braves squad from 1949 to 1972.

Besides Bradley, Schrall also managed the Peoria Redwings of the All-American Girls Professional Baseball League (AAGPBL). He took over the leadership of the Redwings late in 1947 and managed them in the 1948 and 1949 seasons. He later managed for the Hastings Giants of the Class D Nebraska State League from 1957 to 1959.

== Honors ==
In 1983 Schrall was named to the Greater Peoria Sports Hall of Fame.

Schrall is featured in the Baseball Hall of Fame and Museum display Women in Baseball, the AAGPBL permanent display in Cooperstown, New York, which was inaugurated in 1988 in honor of the entire league rather than individual baseball personalities.

== Personal ==
Schrall was a longtime resident of Peoria, Illinois, where he died in 1999 at the age of 91.
