= Jerry Tuttle (Canadian football) =

American gridiron football player (1926–2006)

No. 45, 86
- Position: Quarterback

Personal information
- Born: March 6, 1926; Brady Lake, Ohio, U.S.
- Died: April 25, 2006 (aged 80); Ravenna, Ohio, U.S.
- Listed height: 5 ft 11 in (1.80 m)
- Listed weight: 190 lb (86 kg)

Career information
- High school: Roosevelt (Kent, Ohio)
- College: Kent State

Career history

Playing
- 1950–1952: Toronto Balmy Beach Beachers
- 1953: Kitchener-Waterloo Dutchmen
- 1954: BC Lions

Coaching
- 1950–1951: Toronto Balmy Beach Beachers
- 1953: Kitchener-Waterloo Dutchmen

Awards and highlights
- ORFU All-Star: 1950

Gerald Richard Tuttle (March 6, 1926 – April 25, 2006) was an American professional football quarterback who played in the Ontario Rugby Football Union and Western Interprovincial Football Union. He played college football at Kent State University.

== Early life and college ==
Gerald Richard Tuttle was born on March 6, 1926, in Brady Lake, Ohio. He attended Theodore Roosevelt High School in Kent, Ohio.

He lettered for the Kent State Golden Flashes from 1948 to 1949.

== Professional career ==
Tuttle started seven games at quarterback for the Toronto Balmy Beach Beachers of the Ontario Rugby Football Union (ORFU) in 1950, earning ORFU All-Star honors. He then played in eight games, starting seven, in 1951, and eight games, starting six, in 1952.

He appeared in 12 games for the Kitchener-Waterloo Dutchmen of the ORFU during the 1953 season.

Tuttle played in 11 games for the BC Lions of the Western Interprovincial Football Union during the team's inaugural season in 1954, completing 70 of 148 passes (47.3%) for 991 yards, four touchdowns, and 15 interceptions while also scoring a rushing touchdown and punting twice for 91 yards. He also fumbled five times.

== Coaching career ==
Tuttle also spent time as a player-coach during the 1950 and 1951 seasons with the Balmy Beach Beachers and the 1953 season with the Dutchmen.

== Personal life ==
Tuttle served in the United States Army. He died on April 25, 2006, in Ravenna, Ohio.
