= Ed White (baseball) =

American baseball player (1926–1982)

- Outfielder
- Born: April 6, 1926; Anniston, Alabama, U.S.
- Died: September 28, 1982 (aged 56); Lakeland, Florida, U.S.
- Batted: Right Threw: Right

MLB debut
- September 16, 1955, for the Chicago White Sox

Last MLB appearance
- September 25, 1955, for the Chicago White Sox

MLB statistics
- Batting average: .500
- Hits: 2
- Games played: 3
- Stats at Baseball Reference

Teams
- Chicago White Sox (1955)

Edward Perry White (April 6, 1926 – September 28, 1982) was an American professional baseball outfielder who played in three games for the Chicago White Sox in 1955.

Born in Anniston, Alabama, White attended the University of Alabama, where he played baseball and football. In the former sport, he was selected a first-team All-America in 1950 by the American Baseball Coaches Association; in the latter, he was drafted as an end by Washington in the 19th round of the 1950 National Football League Draft. He chose a professional baseball career and signed with the White Sox organization that season. Listed as 6 feet 2 inches (1.88 m) tall and 200 pounds (91 kg), White threw and batted right-handed.

White spent all but three games of his pro career in the minor leagues, but was a stalwart member of the Memphis Chickasaws of the Double-A Southern Association. In six seasons (1951–1956) at Memphis, he batted over .300 three times and was selected an All-Star in 1955 on the strength of 191 hits, including 32 doubles, 11 triples, 17 home runs and 107 runs batted in; his batting average was a career-high .342.

That earned White, now 29, a call-up to Chicago in September. His three appearances came between September 16 and 25, 1955, all against the Kansas City Athletics. He made his debut in a road game as a pinch hitter for Sandy Consuegra, striking out in the sixth inning against Alex Kellner in a 13–7 defeat. The following day, he replaced Jim Rivera in right field during the tenth inning of a 12–8 Chicago victory, but recorded no plate appearances or chances. Finally, on September 25 at Comiskey Park on the closing day of the season, White started in right field against Kansas City. Batting sixth, he singled twice off Mike Kume, and drew a base on balls, in four plate appearances, and handled two putouts without an error in the field. The White Sox won, 5–0, behind Billy Pierce. The two safeties gave White a career .500 batting average as a major leaguer.

White returned to Memphis for 1956, then played a final year in 1957 that was split between Open-Classficiation Sacramento and Triple-A Minneapolis before leaving baseball. He died in Lakeland, Florida, at 56 on September 28, 1982.
