= Oral P. Tuttle =

American lawyer and politician

Oral P. Tuttle (January 13, 1889–March 9, 1957) was an American lawyer and politician.

== Biography ==
Tuttle was born on a farm near Harrisburg, Illinois. He went to the Harrisburg public schools and received his law degree from Northwestern University Pritzker School of Law. He was admitted to the Illinois bar in 1911 and practiced law in Harrisburg. He served as an Illinois Assistant Attorney General and as deputy circuit court clerk. Tuttle also served as the recorder for Saline County, Illinois. Tuttle served in the United States Navy during World War I. He served in the Illinois House of Representatives from 1915 to 1919 and in the Illinois Senate from 1935 to 1939. Tuttle was involved with the Republican Party. He served an arbitrator for the Illinois Industrial Commission. Tuttle died in Harrisburg, Illinois after suffering from a long illness.
