= Harding Peterson =

American baseball player (1929–2019)

Hardy Peterson
- Catcher
- Born: October 17, 1929; Perth Amboy, New Jersey, U.S.
- Died: April 16, 2019 (aged 89); Palm Harbor, Florida, U.S.
- Batted: Right Threw: Right

MLB debut
- May 5, 1955, for the Pittsburgh Pirates

Last MLB appearance
- August 8, 1959, for the Pittsburgh Pirates

MLB statistics
- Batting average: .273
- Home runs: 3
- Runs batted in: 21
- Stats at Baseball Reference

Teams
- Pittsburgh Pirates (1955, 1957–1959)

Harding William "Pete" Peterson (October 17, 1929 – April 16, 2019) was an American professional baseball player and general manager. He played in Major League Baseball as a catcher from 1955 to 1959. During his playing days, he was more commonly known as Hardy Peterson.

== Biography ==
Raised in Woodbridge Township, New Jersey, Peterson graduated from Woodbridge High School.

A graduate of Rutgers University, where he was a full-season starter on the third-place College World Series team in 1950 and second-team College All American that same year, Peterson spent the first three-plus decades of his career with the Pittsburgh Pirates as a minor and MLB player, minor league manager, farm system director and general manager.

=== Playing career ===
A right-handed batter and thrower, he appeared in 65 major league games over four seasons (1955; 1957–59) and batted .273 with three home runs in limited service, due to a two-year stint in Korea with the U.S. Army. Peterson and is also noted for appearing in the historic last games played at both the Polo Grounds and Ebbets Field in September of 1957. He was 2-for-5 with two runs batted in against the Giants at the Polo Grounds, twice driving home Roberto Clemente. His playing career was effectively ended as the result of a broken arm suffered in a home plate collision at Wrigley Field in early 1959.

=== Managing and executive career ===
Later in 1959 he began his managing career at the Class B level and reached Class AAA in 1967 as skipper of the Pirates' top farm club, the Columbus Jets of the International League.

From 1968 through 1976, he directed Pittsburgh's highly productive farm system and, when longtime general manager Joe L. Brown retired following the 1976 campaign, Peterson succeeded him, splitting duties with longtime executive Joe O'Toole, who handled business matters. One of his first (and most noted) moves was the 1976 trade of catcher Manny Sanguillén and cash to the Oakland A's for manager Chuck Tanner. On Peterson's watch, the Pirates remained consistent contenders and in 1979 won the National League pennant and defeated the favored Baltimore Orioles in a seven-game World Series. That Bucs' team, led by Hall of Fame slugger Willie Stargell, was augmented by two bold in-season trades made by Peterson. Frustrated with Frank Taveras' defensive inconsistency, Peterson dealt the erratic shortstop to the Mets for Tim Foli. Later in the season, he put together a package of three pitchers and acquired two-time National League batting champion Bill Madlock from the San Francisco Giants.

The Pirates faded from contention in the early 1980s and by 1985 the team—rocked by a drug scandal among its players—was put up for sale. After a series of missteps which included the acquisitions of veterans Amos Otis, Gene Tenace and George Hendrick, Peterson was fired on May 23, 1985 and replaced by his predecessor Brown. He eventually joined the New York Yankees, where he worked in their front office and served one season (1990) as the club's general manager. His firing was the last official act of George Steinbrenner before Steinbrenner's suspension from baseball as a result of the "Dave Winfield scandal."

Peterson spent the remainder of his career as a consultant/major league scout for both the San Diego Padres and Toronto Blue Jays organizations, and fully retired from baseball in 1995. He was inducted in the Kinston Professional Baseball Hall of Fame in 1984, as well as the Rutgers University Athletic Hall of Fame in 1997. He was the father of Milwaukee Brewers pitching coach Rick Peterson.

== Death ==
Peterson died on April 16, 2019.

Sporting positions
Preceded by Joe L. Brown	Pittsburgh Pirates General manager 1976–1985	Succeeded by Joe L. Brown
Preceded by Bob Quinn	New York Yankees General manager 1990	Succeeded by Gene Michael
