= Colorado State Rams baseball =

Baseball team representing Colorado State University

Colorado State Rams
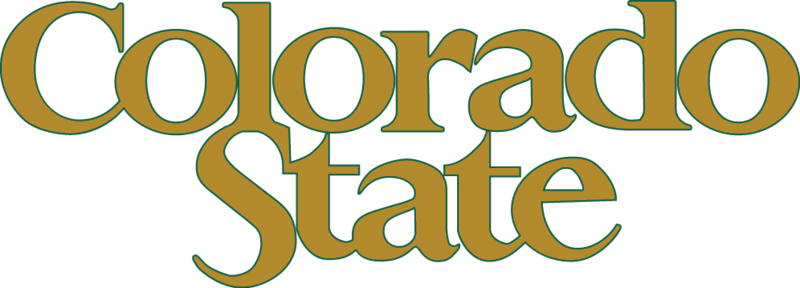
- Founded: 1900
- Defunct: 1992
- University: Colorado State University
- Location: Fort Collins, Colorado
- Nickname: Rams
- Colors: Green and gold

College World Series appearances
- 1950

Regular season conference champions
- 1905, 1908, 1921, 1923, 1938, 1950, 1952, 1954, 1957, 1959, 1972

The Colorado State Rams baseball team represented Colorado State University in college baseball from 1900 through the program's dissolution in 1992. The program reached the College World Series once, in 1950.

== Head coaches ==
Year(s)	Coach	Seasons	W–L–T	Pct
1905	Mal Ramey	1	5–1	.833
1906–1909	Claude Rothgeb	4	–	–
1915–1917	Claude Reeds	3	5–9	.357
1920–1922	Bill Harrison	3	15–11	.577
1923–1925	Joe Hamilton	3	24–6–1	.790
1928–1934	Joe Ryan	7	18–36–1	.336
1935–1943	Andy Clark	9	45–38–1	.542
1947	Maurice Elder	1	3–8	.273
1948–1955	Mark Duncan	8	68–60–1	.531
1956–1975	Irv Ferguson	20	199–354–2	.360
1976–1980	Tom Wheeler	5	107–118–1	.476
1981–1985	Ran Railey	5	73–163	.309
1986–1990	Glen Schwab	5	73–173	.297
1991–1992	Kirk Mason	2	39–78	.333
Totals	14	76	674–1,055–7	.390

== Facilities ==
- Durkee Field (1900–1911)
- Colorado Field (1912–1967)
