= Bill Tuttle =

American baseball player (1929–1998)

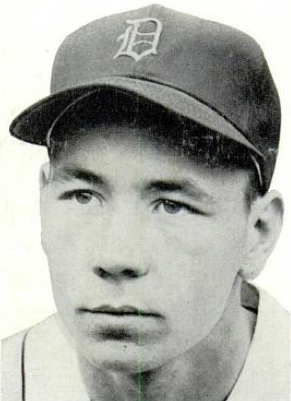
- Tuttle in 1954
- Center fielder
- Born: July 4, 1929; Cramer, Illinois, U.S.
- Died: July 27, 1998 (aged 69); Anoka, Minnesota, U.S.
- Batted: Right Threw: Right

MLB debut
- September 10, 1952, for the Detroit Tigers

Last MLB appearance
- May 11, 1963, for the Minnesota Twins

MLB statistics
- Batting average: .259
- Home runs: 67
- Runs batted in: 443
- Stats at Baseball Reference

Teams
- Detroit Tigers (1952, 1954–1957); Kansas City Athletics (1958–1961); Minnesota Twins (1961–1963)

William Robert Tuttle (July 4, 1929 – July 27, 1998) was an American professional baseball player. Primarily a center fielder, he appeared in 1,270 games played in Major League Baseball over 11 seasons for the Detroit Tigers (1952; 1954–1957), Kansas City Athletics (1958–1961) and Minnesota Twins (1961–1963). Tuttle also played 85 games as a third baseman during 1961 for the Twins; they were the only MLB games he ever played at the "hot corner." He threw and batted right-handed, stood 6 feet (1.8 m) tall and weighed 190 pounds (86 kg).

== Baseball career ==
Tuttle was born and grew up in Cramer, a small farming community located south of Elmwood, Illinois, and three miles southeast of Farmington, where his parents operated a general store. After attending Bradley University in Peoria, Illinois, he played in his first major league game on September 10, 1952.

In his 11-year career, Tuttle had a .259 batting average, with 149 doubles, 47 triples, 67 home runs and 443 RBIs. He had 1,105 career hits. His best offensive seasons came in 1955 and 1959. In the former year, he reached career highs in runs scored (102), home runs (14) and runs batted in (78). In the latter season, Tuttle batted .300 for the only time in his MLB tenure, collecting 139 hits in 126 games. Throughout his career, he was considered one of the most reliable defensive players in the game, leading all American League outfielders in putouts in 1955 and 1960 and assists in 1959 and 1960. He also led center fielders in assists in 1955, 1956 and 1958.

Tuttle wore the number 13 because he thought it brought him good luck. He was also superstitious about his glove, always having a teammate hold it for him while his team was batting during an inning. He would have the same teammate hold it until he had a bad game; then, he would give a different teammate the job.

== Advocacy ==
On practically every baseball card issued for Tuttle, as well as in a number of photographs, a large bulge of chewing tobacco is evident in his cheek. Tuttle died in Anoka, Minnesota, at the age of 69, and oral cancer was in all likelihood the cause of his death. Tuttle was diagnosed with oral cancer five years before his death, and used the last half-decade of his life to raise awareness as an active volunteer for the National Spit Tobacco Education Program (NSTEP). of Oral Health America.

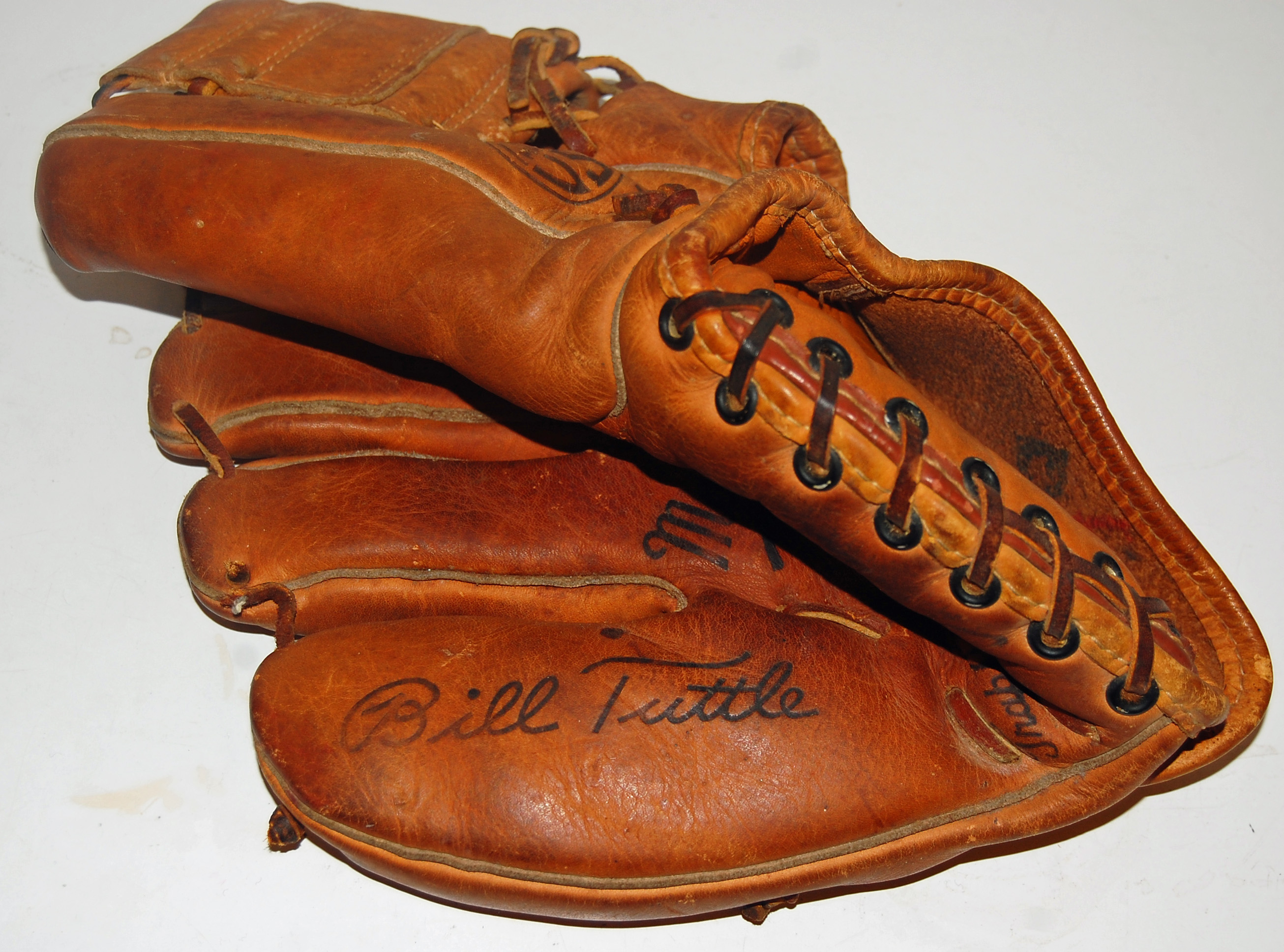
Bill Tuttle signature baseball glove, circa 1964

During the last years of his life, Tuttle was facially disfigured on his right cheek due to extensive surgery for oral cancer. He traveled widely as a public speaker, warning major league players of the dangers of chewing tobacco. "It's going to be pretty hard to tell someone making $4 million a year not to chew", he admitted. "So what we're trying to do is get it off TV."

After being diagnosed with oral cancer, he was interviewed for a Reader's Digest article entitled "My War With A Smoke Free Killer" in which he detailed how he was introduced to chewing tobacco by a teammate while sidelined with an injury and subsequently became addicted. The article showed pictures of a disfigured Tuttle after his many facial surgeries.
