= Wisconsin Badgers baseball =

- Founded: 1896
- Defunct: 1991; 35 years ago
- University: University of Wisconsin–Madison
- Conference: Big Ten
- Location: Madison, Wisconsin
- Home stadium: Guy Lowman Field
- Nickname: Badgers
- Colors: Cardinal and white

College World Series appearances
- 1950

Conference regular season champions
- 1902, 1912, 1930, 1946, 1950*

The Wisconsin Badgers baseball team was the varsity intercollegiate athletic team of the University of Wisconsin–Madison in Madison, Wisconsin, United States. The team competed in NCAA Division I and were members of the Big Ten Conference. The school's first baseball team was fielded in 1900. The baseball program was discontinued at the conclusion of the 1991 season.

== History ==
=== Big Ten Conference championships ===
It won the Big Ten Conference championships in 1902, 1912, 1930, 1946, 1950*.

From 1952 until the time the program was suspended, Wisconsin played their home games at Guy Lowman Field, which was named for the program's coach during the 1918 season. He was also a professor, and the football and basketball coach at one point for the university. The newer field was built in 1971 and became the home of the softball program when they first took the field in 1996.

== Year-by-year results ==
Wisconsin Baseball regular season records 1896–1991
Year	W	L	%
1896	0	5	.000
1897	3	3	.500
1898	-	-	No Team
1899	2	8	.200
1900	4	3	.571
1901	3	4	.429
1902	5	0	1.000
1903	2	9	.182
1904	4	2	.667
1905	4	8	.333
1906	-	-	No Team
1907	2	3	.400
1908	3	7	.300
1909	3	7	.300
1910	4	5	.445
1911	4	7	.364
1912	6	1	.857
1913	3	6	.333
1914	7	5	.583
1915	7	3	.700
1916	3	6	.333
1917	-	-	No Team
1918	1	5	.167
1919	1	6	.143
1920	2	10	.167
1921	8	4	.667
1922	8	3	.727
1923	5	4	.556
1924	6	4	.667
1925	4	8	.333
1926	8	3	.727
1927	4	5	.444
1928	7	5	.583
1929	8	4	.667
1930	9	1	.900
1931	5	4	.556
1932	6	4	.600
1933	5	5	.500
1934	6	6	.500
1935	5	6	.455
1936	5	6	.455
1937	5	4	.556
1938	6	5	.545
1939	6	6	.500
1940	5	7	.417
1941	5	6	.455
1942	7	5	.583
1943	5	3	.625
1944	4	5	.444
1945	8	4	.667
1946	9	2	.818
1947	6	4	.600
1948	5	6	.455
1949	3	9	.250
1950	9	3	.750
1951	5	5	.500
1952	9	6	.600
1953	6	5	.545
1954	10	3	.750
1955	7	8	.467
1956	8	4	.667
1957	3	7	.300
1958	8	7	.533
1959	9	6	.600
1960	5	4	.556
1961	5	9	.357
1962	6	6	.500
1963	8	6	.571
1964	8	7	.533
1965	6	9	.400
1966	6	9	.400
1967	11	6	.647
1968	11	5	.688
1969	7	7	.500
1970	8	7	.533
1971	9	9	.500
1972	7	8	.467
1973	8	8	.500
1974	6	8	.429
1975	9	9	.500
1976	6	7	.462
1977	7	11	.389
1978	10	6	.625
1979	13	5	.722
1980	10	8	.556
1981	3	13	.188
1982	6	10	.375
1983	6	10	.375
1984	6	7	.464
1985	3	13	.188
1986	10	6	.625
1987	5	11	.313
1988	15	13	.536
1989	9	19	.321
1990	8	20	.286
1991	6	22	.214

== NCAA tournament ==
Wisconsin made the NCAA Division I baseball tournament once.

Year	Round	Opponent	Result
1950	Upper Round 1 Upper Round 2 Lower Round 2 Semifinals	Colorado A&M; Rutgers; Alabama; Rutgers	W 7–3; L 3–5; W 3–1; L 2–16

== Major League Baseball ==
Wisconsin has had 38 Major League Baseball draft selections since the draft began in 1965.

Badgers in the Major League Baseball Draft
Year	Player	Round	Team
1965	Joseph Romary	32	Twins
1965	Rick Hense	11	Senators
1966	Carlos Evans	2	Orioles
1966	Vern Geishert	2	Angels
1967	Gary Pinnow	22	Giants
1970	Robert Boschulte	38	Senators
1971	Lon Galli	28	Twins
1971	Michael Bauer	2	Royals
1972	John Stoffel	14	Angels
1974	Timothy Rappe	33	Reds
1976	Duane Gustavson	10	Cubs
1976	Andrew Pascarella	6	Brewers
1977	Thomas Underhill	5	Indians
1978	Patrick Seegers	26	Brewers
1979	Jack Gurholt	20	Twins
1979	Lee Wetenkamp	20	Blue Jays
1979	Mike Hart	13	Mariners
1980	Tom Klawitter	19	Dodgers
1980	Stephen Marsden	9	Dodgers
1981	Dean Rennicke	14	Dodgers
1982	Rob Derksen	16	Brewers
1982	Scott Sabo	12	Twins
1983	Dave Verkuilen	8	Twins
1983	Joe Scime	7	Braves
1983	Mark Doran	1	Angels
1984	Ike Bradley	5	Yankees
1984	Douglas Konruff	13	Royals
1985	Jon Shane	17	Yankees
1988	Scott Fuller	38	White Sox
1988	Michael Noelke	18	Mets
1988	Tom Fischer	1	Red Sox
1989	Scott Cepicky	23	White Sox
1989	Paul Quantrill	6	Red Sox
1990	Lance Painter	25	Padres
1990	Todd Evers	18	Padres
1990	Rodney Myers	12	Royals
1990	Kurt Peltzer	11	Giants
1991	Thomas Vilet	23	Phillies
