= List of NCAA Division I men's basketball programs =

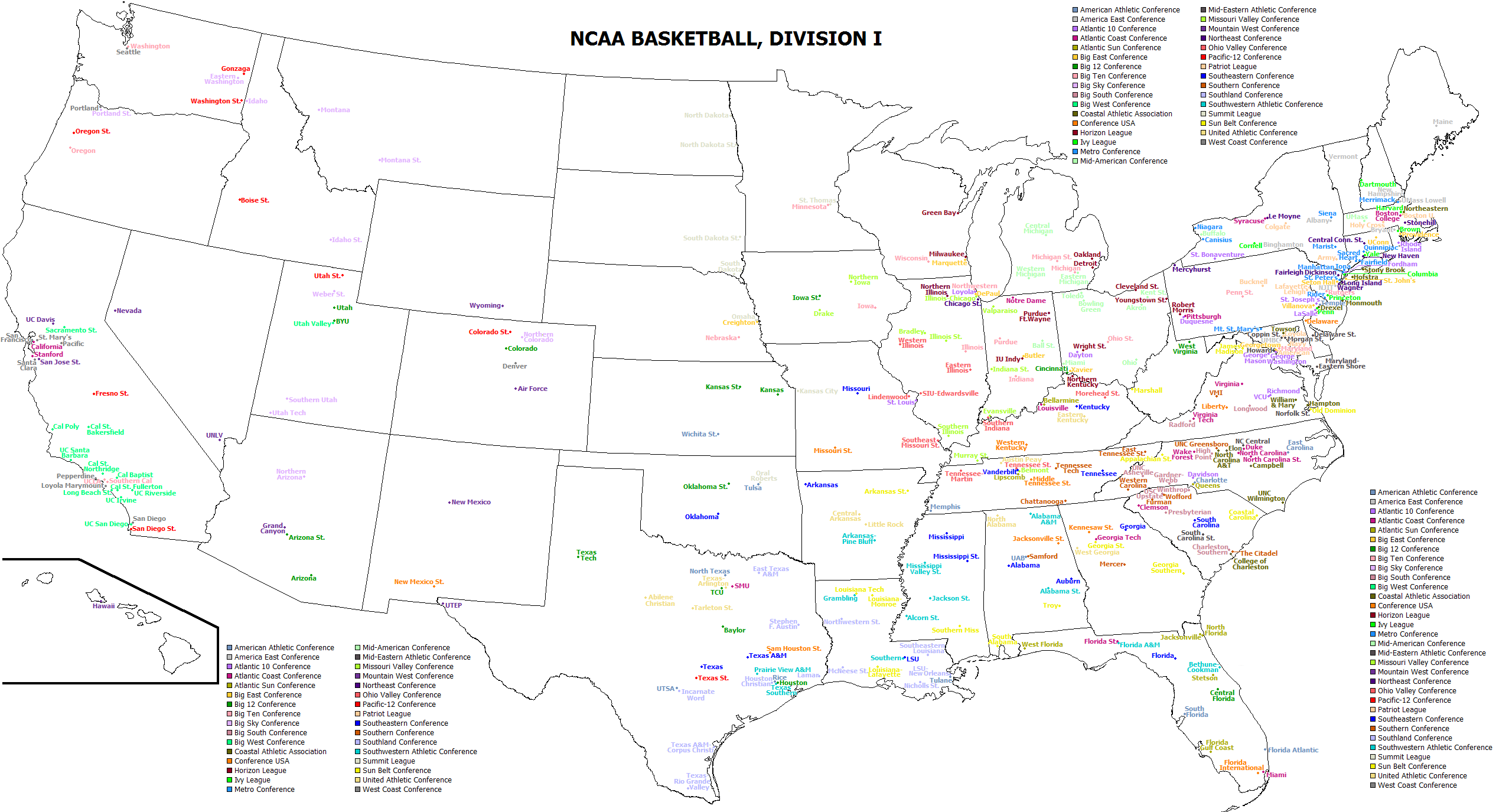
A map of all NCAA Division I basketball teams.

This is a list of schools who field men's basketball teams in Division I of the National Collegiate Athletic Association (NCAA) in the United States. By definition, all schools in this grouping have varsity basketball teams. All of the listed schools also field women's basketball teams except for The Citadel and VMI, both military colleges that were all-male until the 1990s and remain overwhelmingly male today.

There are 361 schools that are full members of 31 Division I basketball conferences, plus four more that are in transition from NCAA Division II, and are members of Division I conferences. Basketball conference affiliations represents those of the 2026–27 NCAA basketball season.

Alaska is the only state without a Division I basketball program, but it does have two Division II programs: the Alaska–Anchorage Seawolves and the Alaska Nanooks (the latter representing the University of Alaska's original Fairbanks campus).

== Programs ==
School	Nickname	Home arena	Conference	Tournament appearances	Final Four appearances	Championship wins
University at Albany (Albany or UAlbany)	Great Danes	SEFCU Arena	America East	(5) 2006, 2007, 2013, 2014, 2015	(0)	(0)
Binghamton University	Bearcats	Binghamton University Events Center	America East	(1) 2009	(0)	(0)
Bryant University	Bulldogs	Chace Athletic Center	America East	(2) 2022, 2025	(0)	(0)
University of Maine (UMaine)	Black Bears	Memorial Gymnasium	America East	(0)	(0)	(0)
University of Maryland, Baltimore County (UMBC)	Retrievers	Chesapeake Employers Insurance Arena	America East	(3) 2008, 2018, 2026	(0)	(0)
University of Massachusetts Lowell (UMass Lowell)	River Hawks	Tsongas Center at UMass Lowell/Costello Athletic Center	America East	(0)	(0)	(0)
University of New Hampshire	Wildcats	Lundholm Gym	America East	(0)	(0)	(0)
New Jersey Institute of Technology (NJIT)	Highlanders	Wellness and Events Center	America East	(0)	(0)	(0)
University of Vermont	Catamounts	Patrick Gym	America East	(10) 2003, 2004, 2005, 2010, 2012, 2017, 2019, 2022, 2023, 2024	(0)	(0)
University of North Carolina at Charlotte (Charlotte)	49ers	Dale F. Halton Arena	American	(11) 1977, 1988, 1992, 1995, 1997, 1998, 1999, 2001, 2002, 2004, 2005	(1) 1977	(0)
East Carolina University (ECU)	Pirates	Williams Arena at Minges Coliseum	American	(2) 1972, 1993	(0)	(0)
Florida Atlantic University (FAU)	Owls	Eleanor R. Baldwin Arena	American	(3) 2002, 2023, 2024	(1) 2023	(0)
University of Memphis (U of M)	Tigers	FedExForum	American	(29) 1955, 1956, 1962, 1973, 1976, 1982*, 1983*, 1984*, 1985*, 1986*, 1988, 1989, 1992, 1993, 1995, 1996, 2003, 2004, 2006, 2007, 2008*, 2009, 2011, 2012, 2013, 2014, 2022, 2023, 2025	(3) 1973, 1985*, 2008*	(0)
University of North Texas (UNT)	Mean Green	UNT Coliseum	American	(4) 1988, 2007, 2010, 2021	(0)	(0)
Rice University	Owls	Tudor Fieldhouse	American	(4) 1940, 1942, 1954, 1970	(0)	(0)
University of South Florida (USF)	Bulls	Yuengling Center	American	(4) 1990, 1992, 2012, 2026	(0)	(0)
Temple University	Owls	Liacouras Center	American	(32) 1944, 1956, 1958, 1964, 1967, 1970, 1972, 1979, 1984, 1985, 1986, 1987, 1988, 1990, 1991, 1992, 1993, 1994, 1995, 1996, 1997, 1998, 1999, 2000, 2001, 2008, 2009, 2010, 2011, 2012, 2013, 2016, 2019	(2) 1956, 1958	(0)
University of Alabama at Birmingham (UAB)	Blazers	Bartow Arena	American	(17) 1981, 1982, 1983, 1984, 1985, 1986, 1987, 1990, 1994, 1999, 2004, 2005, 2006, 2011, 2015, 2022, 2024	(0)	(0)
University of Texas at San Antonio (UTSA)	Roadrunners	Convocation Center	American	(4) 1988, 1999, 2004, 2011	(0)	(0)
Tulane University	Green Wave	Devlin Fieldhouse	American	(3) 1992, 1993, 1995	(0)	(0)
University of Tulsa	Golden Hurricane	Reynolds Center	American	(16) 1955, 1982, 1984, 1985, 1986, 1987, 1994, 1995, 1996, 1997, 1999, 2000, 2002, 2003, 2014, 2016	(0)	(0)
Wichita State University	Shockers	Charles Koch Arena	American	(16) 1964, 1965, 1976, 1981, 1985, 1987, 1988, 2006, 2012, 2013, 2014, 2015, 2016, 2017, 2018, 2021	(2) 1965, 2013	(0)
Boston College (BC)	Eagles	Conte Forum	ACC	(18) 1958, 1967, 1968, 1975, 1981, 1982, 1983, 1985, 1994, 1996, 1997, 2001, 2002, 2004, 2005, 2006, 2007, 2009	(0)	(0)
University of California, Berkeley (California, Cal)	Golden Bears	Haas Pavilion	ACC	(19) 1946, 1957, 1958, 1959, 1960, 1990, 1993, 1994, 1996, 1997, 2001, 2002, 2003, 2006, 2009, 2010, 2012, 2013, 2016	(3) 1946, 1959, 1960	(1) 1959
Clemson University	Tigers	Littlejohn Coliseum	ACC	(16) 1980, 1987, 1989, 1990, 1996, 1997, 1998, 2008, 2009, 2010, 2011, 2018, 2021, 2024, 2025, 2026	(0)	(0)
Duke University	Blue Devils	Cameron Indoor Stadium	ACC	(49) 1955, 1960, 1963, 1964, 1966, 1978, 1979, 1980, 1984, 1985, 1986, 1987, 1988, 1989, 1990, 1991, 1992, 1993, 1994, 1996, 1997, 1998, 1999, 2000, 2001, 2002, 2003, 2004, 2005, 2006, 2007, 2008, 2009, 2010, 2011, 2012, 2013, 2014, 2015, 2016, 2017, 2018, 2019, 2022, 2023, 2024, 2025, 2026	(18) 1963, 1964, 1966, 1978, 1986, 1988, 1989, 1990, 1991, 1992, 1994, 1999, 2001, 2004, 2010, 2015, 2022, 2025	(5) 1991, 1992, 2001, 2010, 2015
Florida State University (FSU)	Seminoles	Donald L. Tucker Center	ACC	(18) 1968, 1972, 1978, 1980, 1988, 1989, 1991, 1992, 1993, 1998, 2009, 2010, 2011, 2012, 2017, 2018, 2019, 2021	(1) 1972	(0)
Georgia Institute of Technology (Georgia Tech)	Yellow Jackets	Hank McCamish Pavilion	ACC	(17) 1960, 1985, 1986, 1987, 1988, 1989, 1990, 1991, 1992, 1993, 1996, 2001, 2004, 2005, 2007, 2010, 2021	(2) 1990, 2004	(0)
University of Louisville	Cardinals	KFC Yum! Center	ACC	(45) 1951, 1959, 1961, 1964, 1967, 1968, 1972, 1974, 1975, 1977, 1978, 1979, 1980, 1981, 1982, 1983, 1984, 1986, 1988, 1989, 1990, 1992, 1993, 1994, 1995, 1996, 1997, 1999, 2000, 2003, 2004, 2005, 2007, 2008, 2009, 2010, 2011, 2012, 2013, 2014, 2015, 2017, 2019, 2025, 2026	(10) 1959, 1972, 1975, 1980, 1982, 1983, 1986, 2005, 2012*vacated, 2013*vacated	(3) 1980, 1986, 2013*vacated
University of Miami (often Miami (FL) or UM)	Hurricanes	Watsco Center	ACC	(13) 1960, 1998, 1999, 2000, 2002, 2008, 2013, 2016, 2017, 2018, 2022, 2023, 2026	(1) 2023	(0)
University of North Carolina at Chapel Hill (North Carolina, UNC)	Tar Heels	Dean Smith Center	ACC	(55) 1941, 1946, 1957, 1959, 1967, 1968, 1969, 1972, 1975, 1976, 1977, 1978, 1979, 1980, 1981, 1982, 1983, 1984, 1985, 1986, 1987, 1988, 1989, 1990, 1991, 1992, 1993, 1994, 1995, 1996, 1997, 1998, 1999, 2000, 2001, 2004, 2005, 2006, 2007, 2008, 2009, 2011, 2012, 2013, 2014, 2015, 2016, 2017, 2018, 2019, 2021, 2022, 2024, 2025, 2026	(21) 1946, 1957, 1967, 1968, 1969, 1972, 1977, 1981, 1982, 1991, 1993, 1995, 1997, 1998, 2000, 2005, 2008, 2009, 2016, 2017, 2022	(6) 1957, 1982, 1993, 2005, 2009, 2017
North Carolina State University (NC State)	Wolfpack	PNC Arena	ACC	(30) 1950, 1951, 1952, 1954, 1956, 1965, 1970, 1974, 1980, 1982, 1983, 1985, 1986, 1987, 1988, 1989, 1991, 2002, 2003, 2004, 2005, 2006, 2012, 2013, 2014, 2015, 2018, 2023, 2024, 2026	(4) 1950, 1974, 1983, 2024	(2) 1974, 1983
University of Notre Dame	Fighting Irish	Edmund P. Joyce Center	ACC	(38) 1953, 1954, 1957, 1958, 1960, 1963, 1965, 1969, 1970, 1971, 1974, 1975, 1976, 1977, 1978, 1979, 1980, 1981, 1985, 1986, 1987, 1988, 1989, 1990, 2001, 2002, 2003, 2007, 2008, 2010, 2011, 2012, 2013, 2015, 2016, 2017, 2022	(1) 1978	(0)
University of Pittsburgh (Pitt)	Panthers	Petersen Events Center	ACC	(27) 1941, 1957, 1958, 1963, 1974, 1981, 1982, 1985, 1987, 1988, 1989, 1991, 1993, 2002, 2003, 2004, 2005, 2006, 2007, 2008, 2009, 2010, 2011, 2013, 2014, 2016, 2023	(1) 1941	(0)
Southern Methodist University (SMU)	Mustangs	Moody Coliseum	ACC	(13) 1955, 1956, 1957, 1965, 1966, 1967, 1984, 1985, 1988, 1993, 2015, 2017, 2026	(1) 1956	(0)
Stanford University	Cardinal	Maples Pavilion	ACC	(17) 1942, 1989, 1992, 1995, 1996, 1997, 1998, 1999, 2000, 2001, 2002, 2003, 2004, 2005, 2007, 2008, 2014	(2) 1942, 1998	(1) 1942
Syracuse University	Orange	Carrier Dome	ACC	(41) 1957, 1966, 1973, 1974, 1975, 1976, 1977, 1978, 1979, 1980, 1983, 1984, 1985, 1986, 1987, 1988, 1989, 1990, 1991, 1992, 1994, 1995, 1996, 1998, 1999, 2000, 2001, 2003, 2004, 2005, 2006, 2009, 2010, 2011, 2012, 2013, 2014, 2016, 2018, 2019, 2021	(6) 1975, 1987, 1996, 2003, 2013, 2016	(1) 2003
University of Virginia (UVA)	Cavaliers	John Paul Jones Arena	ACC	(28) 1976, 1981, 1982, 1983, 1984, 1986, 1987, 1989, 1990, 1991, 1993, 1994, 1995, 1997, 2001, 2007, 2012, 2014, 2015, 2016, 2017, 2018, 2019, 2021, 2023, 2024, 2026	(3) 1981, 1984, 2019	(1) 2019
Virginia Polytechnic Institute and State University (Virginia Tech)	Hokies	Cassell Coliseum	ACC	(13) 1967, 1976, 1979, 1980, 1985, 1986, 1996, 2007, 2017, 2018, 2019, 2021, 2022	(0)	(0)
Wake Forest University	Demon Deacons	Lawrence Joel Veterans Memorial Coliseum	ACC	(24) 1939, 1953, 1961, 1962, 1977, 1981, 1982, 1984, 1991, 1992, 1993, 1994, 1995, 1996, 1997, 2001, 2002, 2003, 2004, 2005, 2009, 2010, 2017	(1) 1962	(0)
Bellarmine University	Knights	Knights Hall	ASUN	(0)	(0)	(0)
Florida Gulf Coast University (FGCU)	Eagles	Alico Arena	ASUN	(3) 2013, 2016, 2017	(0)	(0)
Jacksonville University	Dolphins	Swisher Gymnasium	ASUN	(5) 1970, 1971, 1973, 1979, 1986	(1) 1970	(0)
Lipscomb University	Bisons	Allen Arena	ASUN	(2) 2018, 2025	(0)	(0)
University of North Florida	Ospreys	UNF Arena	ASUN	(1) 2015	(0)	(0)
Queens University of Charlotte	Royals	Curry Arena	ASUN	(1) 2026	(0)	(0)
Stetson University	Hatters	Edmunds Center	ASUN	(1) 2024	(0)	(0)
University of West Florida (Note: Began transition from Division II in 2026.)	Argonauts	UWF Field House	ASUN	(0)	(0)	(0)
Davidson College	Wildcats	John M. Belk Arena	A-10	(15) 1966, 1968, 1969, 1970, 1986, 1998, 2002, 2006, 2007, 2008, 2012, 2013, 2015, 2018, 2022	(0)	(0)
University of Dayton	Flyers	University of Dayton Arena	A-10	(20) 1952, 1965, 1966, 1967, 1969, 1970, 1974, 1984, 1985, 1990, 2000, 2003, 2004, 2009, 2014, 2015, 2016, 2017, 2024	(1) 1967	(0)
Duquesne University	Dukes	UPMC Cooper Fieldhouse	A-10	(6) 1940, 1952, 1969, 1971, 1977, 2024	(1) 1940	(0)
Fordham University	Rams	Rose Hill Gymnasium	A-10	(4) 1953, 1954, 1971, 1992	(0)	(0)
George Mason University	Patriots	EagleBank Arena	A-10	(6) 1989, 1999, 2001, 2006, 2008, 2011	(1) 2006	(0)
George Washington University (GW)	Revolutionaries	Charles E. Smith Athletic Center	A-10	(11) 1954, 1961, 1993, 1994, 1996, 1998, 1999, 2005, 2006, 2007, 2014	(0)	(0)
La Salle University	Explorers	Tom Gola Arena	A-10	(12) 1954, 1955, 1968, 1975, 1978, 1980, 1983, 1988, 1989, 1990, 1992, 2013	(2) 1954, 1955	(1) 1954
Loyola University Chicago (Loyola Chicago)	Ramblers	Joseph J. Gentile Arena	A-10	(8) 1963, 1964, 1966, 1968, 1985, 2018, 2021, 2022	(2) 1963, 2018	(1) 1963
University of Rhode Island	Rams	Ryan Center	A-10	(10) 1961, 1966, 1978, 1988, 1993, 1997, 1998, 1999, 2017, 2018	(0)	(0)
University of Richmond	Spiders	Robins Center	A-10	(10) 1984, 1986, 1988, 1990, 1991, 1998, 2004, 2010, 2011, 2022	(0)	(0)
St. Bonaventure University	Bonnies	Reilly Center	A-10	(8) 1961, 1968, 1970, 1978, 2000, 2012, 2018, 2021	(1) 1970	(0)
Saint Joseph's University (Saint Joe's)	Hawks	Hagan Arena	A-10	(21) 1959, 1960, 1961, 1962, 1963, 1965, 1966, 1969, 1971, 1973, 1974, 1981, 1982, 1986, 1997, 2001, 2003, 2004, 2008, 2014, 2016	(1) 1961	(0)
Saint Louis University (SLU)	Billikens	Chaifetz Arena	A-10	(11) 1952, 1957, 1994, 1995, 1998, 2000, 2012, 2013, 2014, 2019, 2026	(0)	(0)
Virginia Commonwealth University (VCU)	Rams	Stuart C. Siegel Center	A-10	(22) 1980, 1981, 1983, 1984, 1985, 1996, 2004, 2007, 2009, 2011, 2012, 2013, 2014, 2015, 2016, 2017, 2019, 2021, 2023, 2025, 2026	(1) 2011	(0)
Butler University	Bulldogs	Hinkle Fieldhouse	Big East	(16) 1962, 1997, 1998, 2000, 2001, 2003, 2007, 2008, 2009, 2010, 2011, 2013, 2015, 2016, 2017, 2018	(2) 2010, 2011	(0)
Creighton University	Bluejays	CHI Health Center Omaha	Big East	(26) 1941, 1962, 1964, 1974, 1975, 1978, 1981, 1989, 1991, 1999, 2000, 2001, 2002, 2003, 2005, 2007, 2012, 2013, 2014, 2017, 2018, 2021, 2022, 2023, 2024, 2025	(0)	(0)
DePaul University	Blue Demons	Wintrust Arena	Big East	(22) 1943, 1953, 1956, 1959, 1960, 1965, 1976, 1978, 1979, 1980, 1981, 1982, 1984, 1985, 1986*, 1987*, 1988*, 1989*, 1991, 1992, 2000, 2004	(2) 1943, 1979	(0)
Georgetown University	Hoyas	Capital One Arena	Big East	(31) 1943, 1975, 1976, 1979, 1980, 1981, 1982, 1983, 1984, 1985, 1986, 1987, 1988, 1989, 1990, 1991, 1992, 1994, 1995, 1996, 1997, 2001, 2006, 2007, 2008, 2010, 2011, 2012, 2013, 2015, 2021	(5) 1943, 1982, 1984, 1985, 2007	(1) 1984
Marquette University	Golden Eagles	Fiserv Forum	Big East	(37) 1955, 1959, 1961, 1968, 1969, 1971, 1972, 1973, 1974, 1975, 1976, 1977, 1978, 1979, 1980, 1982, 1983, 1993, 1994, 1996, 1997, 2002, 2003, 2006, 2007, 2008, 2009, 2010, 2011, 2012, 2013, 2017, 2019, 2022, 2023, 2024, 2025	(3) 1974, 1977, 2003	(1) 1977
Providence College	Friars	Amica Mutual Pavilion	Big East	(22) 1964, 1965, 1966, 1972, 1973, 1974, 1977, 1978, 1987, 1989, 1990, 1994, 1997, 2001, 2004, 2014, 2015, 2016, 2017, 2018, 2022, 2023	(2) 1973, 1987	(0)
St. John's University	Red Storm	Madison Square Garden/Carnesecca Arena	Big East	(32) 1951, 1952, 1961, 1967, 1968, 1969, 1973, 1976, 1977, 1978, 1979, 1980, 1982, 1983, 1984, 1985, 1986, 1987, 1988, 1990, 1991, 1992, 1993, 1998, 1999, 2000, 2002, 2011, 2015, 2019, 2025, 2026	(2) 1952, 1985	(0)
Seton Hall University	Pirates	Prudential Center	Big East	(14) 1988, 1989, 1991, 1992, 1993, 1994, 2000, 2004, 2006, 2016, 2017, 2018, 2019, 2022	(1) 1989	(0)
University of Connecticut (UConn)	Huskies	Harry A. Gampel Pavilion/PeoplesBank Arena	Big East	(39) 1951, 1954, 1956, 1957, 1958, 1959, 1960, 1963, 1964, 1965, 1967, 1976, 1979, 1990, 1991, 1992, 1994, 1995, 1996, 1998, 1999, 2000, 2002, 2003, 2004, 2005, 2006, 2008, 2009, 2011, 2012, 2014, 2016, 2021, 2022, 2023, 2024, 2025, 2026	(8) 1999, 2004, 2009, 2011, 2014, 2023, 2024, 2026	(6) 1999, 2004, 2011, 2014, 2023, 2024
Villanova University	Wildcats	Finneran Pavilion/Xfinity Mobile Arena	Big East	(44) 1939, 1949, 1951, 1955, 1962, 1964, 1969, 1970, 1971*, 1972, 1978, 1980, 1981, 1982, 1983, 1984, 1985, 1986, 1988, 1990, 1991, 1995, 1996, 1997, 1999, 2005, 2006, 2007, 2008, 2009, 2010, 2011, 2013, 2014, 2015, 2016, 2017, 2018, 2019, 2021, 2022, 2026	(7) 1939, 1971*, 1985, 2009, 2016, 2018, 2022	(3) 1985, 2016, 2018
Xavier University	Musketeers	Cintas Center	Big East	(30) 1961, 1983, 1986, 1987, 1988, 1989, 1990, 1991, 1993, 1995, 1997, 1998, 2001, 2002, 2003, 2004, 2006, 2007, 2008, 2009, 2010, 2011, 2012, 2014, 2015, 2016, 2017, 2018, 2023, 2025	(0)	(0)
Eastern Washington University	Eagles	Reese Court	Big Sky	(3) 2004, 2015, 2021	(0)	(0)
University of Idaho	Vandals	Idaho Central Credit Union Arena	Big Sky	(5) 1981, 1982, 1989, 1990, 2026	(0)	(0)
Idaho State University	Bengals	Holt Arena	Big Sky	(10) 1953, 1954, 1955, 1956, 1957, 1958, 1959, 1974, 1977, 1987	(0)	(0)
University of Montana	Grizzlies	Dahlberg Arena	Big Sky	(13) 1975, 1991, 1992, 1997, 2002, 2005, 2006, 2010, 2012, 2013, 2018, 2019, 2025	(0)	(0)
Montana State University	Bobcats	Worthington Arena	Big Sky	(6) 1951, 1986, 1996, 2022, 2023, 2024	(0)	(0)
Northern Arizona University	Lumberjacks	Walkup Skydome	Big Sky	(2) 1998, 2000	(0)	(0)
University of Northern Colorado	Bears	Butler–Hancock Sports Pavilion	Big Sky	(1) 2011	(0)	(0)
Portland State University	Vikings	Viking Pavilion	Big Sky	(2) 2008, 2009	(0)	(0)
Southern Utah University	Thunderbirds	America First Event Center	Big Sky	(1) 2001	(0)	(0)
Utah Tech University	Trailblazers	Burns Arena	Big Sky	(0)	(0)	(0)
Weber State University	Wildcats	Dee Events Center	Big Sky	(15) 1968, 1969, 1970, 1971, 1972, 1973, 1978, 1979, 1980, 1983, 1995, 1999, 2003, 2007, 2014, 2016	(0)	(0)
Charleston Southern University	Buccaneers	CSU Field House	Big South	(1) 1997	(0)	(0)
Gardner–Webb University	Runnin' Bulldogs	Paul Porter Arena	Big South	(1) 2019	(0)	(0)
High Point University	Panthers	Qubein Center	Big South	(2) 2025, 2026	(0)	(0)
Longwood University	Lancers	Joan Perry Brock Center	Big South	(2) 2022, 2024	(0)	(0)
Presbyterian College	Blue Hose	Templeton Physical Education Center	Big South	(0)	(0)	(0)
Radford University	Highlanders	Dedmon Center	Big South	(3) 1998, 2009, 2018	(0)	(0)
University of North Carolina at Asheville (UNC Asheville)	Bulldogs	Kimmel Arena	Big South	(5) 2003, 2011, 2012, 2016, 2023	(0)	(0)
University of South Carolina Upstate (USC Upstate)	Spartans	G. B. Hodge Center	Big South	(0)	(0)	(0)
Winthrop University	Eagles	Winthrop Coliseum	Big South	(11) 1999, 2000, 2001, 2002, 2005, 2006, 2007, 2008, 2010, 2017, 2021	(0)	(0)
University of California, Los Angeles (UCLA)	Bruins	Pauley Pavilion	Big Ten	(54) 1950, 1952, 1956, 1962, 1963, 1964, 1965, 1967, 1968, 1969, 1970, 1971, 1972, 1973, 1974, 1975, 1976, 1977, 1978, 1979, 1980, 1981, 1983, 1987, 1989, 1990, 1991, 1992, 1993, 1994, 1995, 1996, 1997, 1998, 1999*, 2000, 2001, 2002, 2005, 2006, 2007, 2008, 2009, 2011, 2013, 2014, 2015, 2017, 2018, 2021, 2022, 2023, 2025, 2026	(19) 1962, 1964, 1965, 1967, 1968, 1969, 1970, 1971, 1972, 1973, 1974, 1975, 1976, 1980, 1995, 2006, 2007, 2008, 2021	(11) 1964, 1965, 1967, 1968, 1969, 1970, 1971, 1972, 1973, 1975, 1995
University of Illinois Urbana–Champaign (Illinois, U of I)	Fighting Illini	State Farm Center	Big Ten	(36) 1942, 1949, 1951, 1952, 1963, 1981, 1983, 1984, 1985, 1986, 1987, 1988, 1989, 1990, 1993, 1994, 1995, 1997, 1998, 2000, 2001, 2002, 2003, 2004, 2005, 2006, 2007, 2009, 2011, 2013, 2021, 2022, 2023, 2024, 2025, 2026	(6) 1949, 1951, 1952, 1989, 2005, 2026	(0)
Indiana University Bloomington (Indiana, IU)	Hoosiers	Simon Skjodt Assembly Hall	Big Ten	(49) 1940, 1953, 1954, 1958, 1967, 1973, 1975, 1976, 1978, 1980, 1981, 1982, 1983, 1984, 1986, 1987, 1988, 1989, 1990, 1991, 1992, 1993, 1994, 1995, 1996, 1997, 1998, 1999, 2000, 2001, 2002, 2003, 2006, 2007, 2008, 2012, 2013, 2015, 2016, 2022, 2023	(8) 1940, 1953, 1973, 1976, 1981, 1987, 1992, 2002	(5) 1940, 1953, 1976, 1981, 1987
University of Iowa	Hawkeyes	Carver–Hawkeye Arena	Big Ten	(30) 1955, 1956, 1970, 1979, 1980, 1981, 1982, 1983, 1985, 1986, 1987, 1988, 1989, 1991, 1992, 1993, 1996, 1997, 1999, 2001, 2005, 2006, 2014, 2015, 2016, 2019, 2021, 2022, 2023, 2026	(3) 1955, 1956, 1980	(0)
University of Maryland, College Park (Maryland)	Terrapins	Xfinity Center	Big Ten	(31) 1958, 1973, 1975, 1980, 1981, 1983, 1984, 1985, 1986, 1988*, 1994, 1995, 1996, 1997, 1998, 1999, 2000, 2001, 2002, 2003, 2004, 2007, 2009, 2010, 2015, 2016, 2017, 2019, 2021, 2023, 2025	(2) 2001, 2002	(1) 2002
University of Michigan	Wolverines	Crisler Center	Big Ten	(33) 1948, 1964, 1965, 1966, 1974, 1975, 1976, 1977, 1985, 1986, 1987, 1988, 1989, 1990, 1992*, 1993*, 1994, 1995, 1996*, 1998*, 2009, 2011, 2012, 2013, 2014, 2016, 2017, 2018, 2019, 2021, 2022, 2025, 2026	(9) 1964, 1965, 1976, 1989, 1992*, 1993*, 2013, 2018, 2026	(2) 1989, 2026
Michigan State University	Spartans	Breslin Student Events Center	Big Ten	(39) 1957, 1959, 1978, 1979, 1985, 1986, 1990, 1991, 1992, 1994, 1995, 1998, 1999, 2000, 2001, 2002, 2003, 2004, 2005, 2006, 2007, 2008, 2009, 2010, 2011, 2012, 2013, 2014, 2015, 2016, 2017, 2018, 2019, 2021, 2022, 2023, 2024, 2025, 2026	(10) 1957, 1979, 1999, 2000, 2001, 2005, 2009, 2010, 2015, 2019	(2) 1979, 2000
University of Minnesota	Golden Gophers	Williams Arena	Big Ten	(14) 1972, 1982, 1989, 1990, 1994*, 1995*, 1997*, 1999, 2005, 2009, 2010, 2013, 2017, 2019	(1) 1997*	(0)
University of Nebraska–Lincoln (Nebraska)	Cornhuskers	Pinnacle Bank Arena	Big Ten	(9) 1986, 1991, 1992, 1993, 1994, 1998, 2014, 2024, 2026	(0)	(0)
Northwestern University	Wildcats	Welsh–Ryan Arena	Big Ten	(3) 2017, 2023, 2024	(0)	(0)
Ohio State University	Buckeyes	Value City Arena	Big Ten	(36) 1939, 1944, 1945, 1946, 1950, 1960, 1961, 1962, 1968, 1971, 1980, 1982, 1983, 1985, 1987, 1990, 1991, 1992, 1999*, 2000*, 2001*, 2002*, 2006, 2007, 2009, 2010, 2011, 2012, 2013, 2014, 2015, 2018, 2019, 2021, 2022, 2026	(11) 1939, 1944, 1945, 1946, 1960, 1961, 1962, 1968, 1999*, 2007, 2012	(1) 1960
University of Oregon	Ducks	Matthew Knight Arena	Big Ten	(19) 1939, 1945, 1960, 1961, 1995, 2000, 2002, 2003, 2007, 2008, 2013, 2014, 2015, 2016, 2017, 2019, 2021, 2024, 2025	(2) 1939, 2017	(1) 1939
Pennsylvania State University (Penn State)	Nittany Lions	Bryce Jordan Center	Big Ten	(10) 1942, 1952, 1954, 1955, 1965, 1991, 1996, 2001, 2011, 2023	(1) 1954	(0)
Purdue University	Boilermakers	Mackey Arena	Big Ten	(37) 1969, 1977, 1980, 1983, 1984, 1985, 1986, 1987, 1988, 1990, 1991, 1993, 1994, 1995, 1996, 1997, 1998, 1999, 2000, 2003, 2007, 2008, 2009, 2010, 2011, 2012, 2015, 2016, 2017, 2018, 2019, 2021, 2022, 2023, 2024, 2025, 2026	(3) 1969, 1980, 2024	(0)
Rutgers University–New Brunswick (Rutgers)	Scarlet Knights	Jersey Mike's Arena	Big Ten	(8) 1975, 1976, 1979, 1983, 1989, 1991, 2021, 2022	(1) 1976	(0)
University of Southern California (USC)	Trojans	Galen Center	Big Ten	(21) 1940, 1954, 1960, 1961, 1979, 1982, 1985, 1991, 1992, 1997, 2001, 2002, 2007, 2008, 2009, 2011, 2016, 2017, 2021, 2022, 2023	(2) 1940, 1954	(0)
University of Washington (UW, U-Dub)	Huskies	Alaska Airlines Arena at Hec Edmundson Pavilion	Big Ten	(17) 1943, 1948, 1951, 1953, 1976, 1984, 1985, 1986, 1998, 1999, 2004, 2005, 2006, 2009, 2010, 2011, 2019	(1) 1953	(0)
University of Wisconsin–Madison (Wisconsin)	Badgers	Kohl Center	Big Ten	(29) 1941, 1947, 1994, 1997, 1999, 2000, 2001, 2002, 2003, 2004, 2005, 2006, 2007, 2008, 2009, 2010, 2011, 2012, 2013, 2014, 2015, 2016, 2017, 2019, 2021, 2022, 2024, 2025, 2026	(4) 1941, 2000, 2014, 2015	(1) 1941
University of Arizona	Wildcats	McKale Center	Big 12	(40) 1951, 1976, 1977, 1985, 1986, 1987, 1988, 1989, 1990, 1991, 1992, 1993, 1994, 1995, 1996, 1997, 1998, 1999*, 2000, 2001, 2002, 2003, 2004, 2005, 2006, 2007, 2008, 2009, 2011, 2013, 2014, 2015, 2016, 2017, 2018, 2022, 2023, 2024, 2025, 2026	(5) 1988, 1994, 1997, 2001, 2026	(1) 1997
Arizona State University	Sun Devils	Desert Financial Arena	Big 12	(17) 1958, 1961, 1962, 1963, 1964, 1973, 1975, 1980, 1981, 1991, 1995, 2003, 2009, 2014, 2018, 2019, 2023	(0)	(0)
Baylor University	Bears	Foster Pavilion	Big 12	(17) 1946, 1948, 1950, 1988, 2008, 2010, 2012, 2014, 2015, 2016, 2017, 2019, 2021, 2022, 2023, 2024, 2025	(3) 1948, 1950, 2021	(1) 2021
Brigham Young University (BYU)	Cougars	Marriott Center	Big 12	(33) 1950, 1951, 1957, 1965, 1969, 1971, 1972, 1979, 1980, 1981, 1984, 1987, 1988, 1990, 1991, 1992, 1993, 1995, 2001, 2003, 2004, 2007, 2008, 2009, 2010, 2011, 2012, 2014, 2015, 2021, 2024, 2025, 2026	(0)	(0)
University of Central Florida (UCF)	Knights	Addition Financial Arena	Big 12	(6) 1994, 1996, 2004, 2005, 2019, 2026	(0)	(0)
University of Cincinnati (UC)	Bearcats	Fifth Third Arena	Big 12	(33) 1958, 1959, 1960, 1961, 1962, 1963, 1966, 1975, 1976, 1977, 1992, 1993, 1994, 1995, 1996, 1997, 1998, 1999, 2000, 2001, 2002, 2003, 2004, 2005, 2011, 2012, 2013, 2014, 2015, 2016, 2017, 2018, 2019	(6) 1959, 1960, 1961, 1962, 1963, 1992	(2) 1961, 1962
University of Colorado Boulder (Colorado)	Buffaloes	CU Events Center	Big 12	(16) 1940, 1942, 1946, 1954, 1955, 1962, 1963, 1969, 1997, 2003, 2012, 2013, 2014, 2016, 2021, 2024	(2) 1942, 1955	(0)
University of Houston	Cougars	Fertitta Center	Big 12	(27) 1956, 1961, 1965, 1966, 1967, 1968, 1970, 1971, 1972, 1973, 1978, 1981, 1982, 1983, 1984, 1987, 1990, 1992, 2010, 2018, 2019, 2021, 2022, 2023, 2024, 2025, 2026	(7) 1967, 1968, 1982, 1983, 1984, 2021, 2025	(0)
Iowa State University	Cyclones	Hilton Coliseum	Big 12	(25) 1944, 1985, 1986, 1988, 1989, 1992, 1993, 1995, 1996, 1997, 2000, 2001, 2005, 2012, 2013, 2014, 2015, 2016, 2017, 2019, 2022, 2023, 2024, 2025, 2026	(1) 1944	(0)
University of Kansas	Jayhawks	Allen Fieldhouse	Big 12	(54) 1940, 1942, 1952, 1953, 1957, 1960, 1966, 1967, 1971, 1974, 1975, 1978, 1981, 1984, 1985, 1986, 1987, 1988, 1990, 1991, 1992, 1993, 1994, 1995, 1996, 1997, 1998, 1999, 2000, 2001, 2002, 2003, 2004, 2005, 2006, 2007, 2008, 2009, 2010, 2011, 2012, 2013, 2014, 2015, 2016, 2017, 2018, 2019, 2021, 2022, 2023, 2024, 2025, 2026	(16) 1940, 1952, 1953, 1957, 1971, 1974, 1986, 1988, 1991, 1993, 2002, 2003, 2008, 2012, 2018, 2022	(4) 1952, 1988, 2008, 2022
Kansas State University	Wildcats	Bramlage Coliseum	Big 12	(32) 1948, 1951, 1956, 1958, 1959, 1961, 1964, 1968, 1970, 1972, 1973, 1975, 1977, 1980, 1981, 1982, 1987, 1988, 1989, 1990, 1993, 1996, 2008, 2010, 2011, 2012, 2013, 2014, 2017, 2018, 2019, 2023	(4) 1948, 1951, 1958, 1964	(0)
Oklahoma State University–Stillwater (Oklahoma State)	Cowboys	Gallagher-Iba Arena	Big 12	(29) 1945, 1946, 1949, 1951, 1953, 1954, 1958, 1965, 1983, 1991, 1992, 1993, 1994, 1995, 1998, 1999, 2000, 2001, 2002, 2003, 2004, 2005, 2009, 2010, 2013, 2014, 2015, 2017, 2021	(6) 1945, 1946, 1949, 1951, 1995, 2004	(2) 1945, 1946
Texas Christian University (TCU)	Horned Frogs	Schollmaier Arena	Big 12	(12) 1952, 1953, 1959, 1968, 1971, 1987, 1998, 2018, 2022, 2023, 2024, 2026	(0)	(0)
Texas Tech University	Red Raiders	United Supermarkets Arena	Big 12	(22) 1954, 1956, 1961, 1962, 1973, 1976, 1985, 1986, 1993, 1996, 2002, 2004, 2005, 2007, 2016, 2018, 2019, 2021, 2022, 2024, 2025, 2026	(1) 2019	(0)
University of Utah	Utes	Jon M. Huntsman Center	Big 12	(30) 1944, 1945, 1955, 1956, 1959, 1960, 1961, 1966, 1977, 1978, 1979, 1981, 1983, 1986, 1991, 1993, 1995, 1996, 1997, 1998, 1999, 2000, 2002, 2003, 2004, 2005, 2009, 2015, 2016	(4) 1944, 1961, 1966, 1998	(1) 1944
West Virginia University (WVU)	Mountaineers	WVU Coliseum	Big 12	(31) 1955, 1956, 1957, 1958, 1959, 1960, 1962, 1963, 1965, 1967, 1982, 1983, 1984, 1986, 1987, 1989, 1992, 1998, 2005, 2006, 2008, 2009, 2010, 2011, 2012, 2015, 2016, 2017, 2018, 2021, 2023	(2) 1959, 2010	(0)
California Baptist University (CBU)	Lancers	Fowler Events Center	Big West	(1) 2026	(0)	(0)
California Polytechnic State University (Cal Poly)	Mustangs	Mott Gym	Big West	(1) 2014	(0)	(0)
California State University, Bakersfield (CSU Bakersfield or Cal State Bakersfield)	Roadrunners	Icardo Center	Big West	(1) 2016	(0)	(0)
California State University, Fullerton (Cal State Fullerton)	Titans	Titan Gym	Big West	(4) 1978, 2008, 2018, 2022	(0)	(0)
California State University, Northridge (Cal State Northridge or CSUN)	Matadors	Matadome	Big West	(2) 2001, 2009	(0)	(0)
California State University, Long Beach (Long Beach State)	The Beach	Walter Pyramid	Big West	(10) 1970, 1971*, 1972*, 1973*, 1977, 1993, 1995, 2007, 2012, 2024	(0)	(0)
California State University, Sacramento (Sacramento State)	Hornets	Colberg Court	Big West	(0)	(0)	(0)
University of California, Irvine (UC Irvine)	Anteaters	Bren Events Center	Big West	(2) 2015, 2019	(0)	(0)
University of California, Riverside (UC Riverside)	Highlanders	UC Riverside Student Recreation Center	Big West	(0)	(0)	(0)
University of California, San Diego (UC San Diego, UCSD)	Tritons	LionTree Arena	Big West (Note: UC San Diego joins the West Coast Conference in 2027.)	(1) 2025	(0)	(0)
University of California, Santa Barbara (UC Santa Barbara, UCSB)	Gauchos	UC Santa Barbara Events Center	Big West	(7) 1988, 1990, 2002, 2010, 2011, 2021, 2023	(0)	(0)
Utah Valley University	Wolverines	UCCU Center	Big West	(0)	(0)	(0)
Campbell University	Fighting Camels	John W. Pope Jr. Convocation Center	CAA	(1) 1992	(0)	(0)
College of Charleston (Charleston)	Cougars	TD Arena	CAA	(7) 1994, 1997, 1998, 1999, 2018, 2023, 2024	(0)	(0)
Drexel University	Dragons	Daskalakis Athletic Center	CAA	(5) 1986, 1994, 1995, 1996, 2021	(0)	(0)
Elon University	Phoenix	Schar Center	CAA	(0)	(0)	(0)
Hampton University	Pirates	Hampton Convocation Center	CAA	(6) 2001, 2002, 2006, 2011, 2015, 2016	(0)	(0)
Hofstra University	Pride	Hofstra Arena	CAA	(5) 1976, 1977, 2000, 2001, 2026	(0)	(0)
Monmouth University	Hawks	OceanFirst Bank Center	CAA	(4) 1996, 2001, 2004, 2006	(0)	(0)
North Carolina Agricultural and Technical State University (North Carolina A&T)	Aggies	Corbett Sports Center	CAA	(10) 1982, 1983, 1984, 1985, 1986, 1987, 1988, 1994, 1995, 2013	(0)	(0)
Northeastern University	Huskies	Matthews Arena	CAA	(9) 1981, 1982, 1984, 1985, 1986, 1987, 1991, 2015, 2019	(0)	(0)
Stony Brook University	Seawolves	Island Federal Credit Union Arena	CAA	(1) 2016	(0)	(0)
Towson University	Tigers	SECU Arena	CAA	(2) 1990, 1991	(0)	(0)
University of North Carolina at Wilmington (UNCW or UNC Wilmington)	Seahawks	Trask Coliseum	CAA	(7) 2000, 2002, 2003, 2006, 2016, 2017, 2025	(0)	(0)
College of William & Mary	Tribe	Kaplan Arena	CAA	(0)	(0)	(0)
University of Delaware	Fightin' Blue Hens	Bob Carpenter Center	Conference USA	(6) 1992, 1993, 1998, 1999, 2014, 2022	(0)	(0)
Florida International University (FIU)	Panthers	FIU Arena	Conference USA	(1) 1995	(0)	(0)
Jacksonville State University	Gamecocks	Pete Mathews Coliseum	Conference USA	(2) 2017, 2022	(0)	(0)
Kennesaw State University	Owls	KSU Convocation Center	Conference USA	(2) 2023, 2026	(0)	(0)
Liberty University	Flames	Liberty Arena/Vines Center	Conference USA	(6) 1994, 2004, 2013, 2019, 2021, 2025	(0)	(0)
Middle Tennessee State University (Middle Tennessee, MTSU)	Blue Raiders	Murphy Center	Conference USA	(9) 1975, 1977, 1982, 1985, 1987, 1989, 2013, 2016, 2017	(0)	(0)
Missouri State University	Bears	Great Southern Bank Arena	Conference USA	(6) 1987, 1988, 1989, 1990, 1992, 1999	(0)	(0)
New Mexico State University	Aggies	Pan American Center	Conference USA	(26) 1952, 1959, 1960, 1967, 1968, 1969, 1970, 1971, 1975, 1979, 1990, 1991, 1992*, 1993*, 1994*, 1999, 2007, 2010, 2012, 2013, 2014, 2015, 2017, 2018, 2019, 2022	(1) 1970	(0)
Sam Houston State University (Sam Houston)	Bearkats	Bernard Johnson Coliseum	Conference USA	(2) 2003, 2010	(0)	(0)
Western Kentucky University (WKU)	Hilltoppers	E. A. Diddle Arena	Conference USA	(24) 1940, 1960, 1962, 1966, 1967, 1970, 1971*, 1976, 1978, 1980, 1981, 1986, 1987, 1993, 1994, 1995, 2001, 2002, 2003, 2008, 2009, 2012, 2013, 2024	(1) 1971*	(0)
Cleveland State University	Vikings	Wolstein Center	Horizon League	(3) 1986, 2009, 2021	(0)	(0)
University of Detroit Mercy	Titans	Calihan Hall	Horizon League	(6) 1962, 1977, 1979, 1998, 1999, 2012	(0)	(0)
Indiana University Indianapolis (IU Indy)	Jaguars	James T. Morris Arena	Horizon League	(1) 2003	(0)	(0)
University of Wisconsin-Milwaukee (Milwaukee)	Panthers	UW–Milwaukee Panther Arena	Horizon League	(4) 2003, 2005, 2006, 2014	(0)	(0)
Northern Illinois University (NIU)	Huskies	Convocation Center	Horizon League	(3) 1982, 1991, 1996	(0)	(0)
Northern Kentucky University (NKU)	Norse	Truist Arena	Horizon League	(3) 2017, 2019, 2023	(0)	(0)
Oakland University	Golden Grizzlies	OU Credit Union O'rena	Horizon League	(4) 2005, 2010, 2011, 2024	(0)	(0)
Purdue University Fort Wayne (Purdue Fort Wayne)	Mastodons	Hilliard Gates Sports Center/Allen County War Memorial Coliseum	Horizon League	(0)	(0)	(0)
Robert Morris University	Colonials	UPMC Events Center	Horizon League	(9) 1982, 1983, 1989, 1990, 1992, 2009, 2010, 2015, 2025	(0)	(0)
University of Wisconsin–Green Bay (Green Bay)	Phoenix	Resch Center	Horizon League	(5) 1991, 1994, 1995, 1996, 2016	(0)	(0)
Wright State University	Raiders	Nutter Center	Horizon League	(5) 1993, 2007, 2018, 2022, 2026	(0)	(0)
Youngstown State University	Penguins	Beeghly Center	Horizon League	(0)	(0)	(0)
Brown University	Bears	Pizzitola Sports Center	Ivy League	(2) 1939, 1986	(0)	(0)
Columbia University	Lions	Levien Gymnasium	Ivy League	(3) 1948, 1951, 1968	(0)	(0)
Cornell University	Big Red	Newman Arena	Ivy League	(5) 1954, 1988, 2008, 2009, 2010	(0)	(0)
Dartmouth College	Big Green	Leede Arena	Ivy League	(7) 1941, 1942, 1943, 1944, 1956, 1958, 1959	(2) 1942, 1944	(0)
Harvard University	Crimson	Lavietes Pavilion	Ivy League	(5) 1946, 2012, 2013, 2014, 2015	(0)	(0)
University of Pennsylvania (Penn)	Quakers	Palestra	Ivy League	(25) 1953, 1970, 1971, 1972, 1973, 1974, 1975, 1978, 1979, 1980, 1982, 1985, 1987, 1993, 1994, 1995, 1999, 2000, 2002, 2003, 2005, 2006, 2007, 2018, 2026	(1) 1979	(0)
Princeton University	Tigers	Jadwin Gymnasium	Ivy League	(26) 1952, 1955, 1960, 1961, 1963, 1964, 1965, 1967, 1969, 1976, 1977, 1981, 1983, 1984, 1989, 1990, 1991, 1992, 1996, 1997, 1998, 2001, 2004, 2011, 2017, 2023	(1) 1965	(0)
Yale University	Bulldogs	John J. Lee Amphitheater	Ivy League	(8) 1949, 1957, 1962, 2016, 2019, 2022, 2024, 2025	(0)	(0)
Canisius University	Golden Griffins	Koessler Athletic Center	MAAC	(4) 1955, 1956, 1957, 1996	(0)	(0)
Fairfield University	Stags	Webster Bank Arena	MAAC	(6) 1960, 1961, 1962, 1986, 1987, 1997	(0)	(0)
Iona University	Gaels	Hynes Athletic Center	MAAC	(16) 1979, 1980, 1984, 1985, 1998, 2000, 2001, 2006, 2012, 2013, 2016, 2017, 2018, 2019, 2021, 2023	(0)	(0)
Manhattan University	Jaspers	Draddy Gymnasium	MAAC	(8) 1956, 1958, 1993, 1995, 2003, 2004, 2014, 2015	(0)	(0)
Marist University	Red Foxes	McCann Field House	MAAC	(2) 1986, 1987	(0)	(0)
Merrimack College	Warriors	Hammel Court	MAAC	(0)	(0)	(0)
Mount St. Mary's University	Mountaineers	Knott Arena	MAAC	(7) 1995, 1999, 2008, 2014, 2017, 2021, 2025	(0)	(0)
Niagara University	Purple Eagles	Gallagher Center	MAAC	(3) 1970, 2005, 2007	(0)	(0)
Quinnipiac University	Bobcats	TD Bank Sports Center	MAAC	(0)	(0)	(0)
Rider University	Broncs	Alumni Gymnasium	MAAC	(3) 1984, 1993, 1994	(0)	(0)
Sacred Heart University	Pioneers	William H. Pitt Center	MAAC	(0)	(0)	(0)
Saint Peter's University	Peacocks	Run Baby Run Arena	MAAC	(5) 1991, 1995, 2011, 2022, 2024	(0)	(0)
Siena University	Saints	MVP Arena	MAAC	(7) 1989, 1999, 2002, 2008, 2009, 2010, 2026	(0)	(0)
University of Akron	Zips	James A. Rhodes Arena	MAC	(8) 1986, 2009, 2011, 2013, 2022, 2024, 2025, 2026	(0)	(0)
Ball State University	Cardinals	John E. Worthen Arena	MAC	(7) 1981, 1986, 1989, 1990, 1993, 1995, 2000	(0)	(0)
Bowling Green State University (Bowling Green)	Falcons	Stroh Center	MAC	(4) 1959, 1962, 1963, 1968	(0)	(0)
University at Buffalo	Bulls	Alumni Arena	MAC	(4) 2015, 2016, 2018, 2019	(0)	(0)
Central Michigan University	Chippewas	McGuirk Arena	MAC	(4) 1975, 1977, 1987, 2003	(0)	(0)
Eastern Michigan University	Eagles	Convocation Center	MAC	(4) 1988, 1991, 1996, 1998	(0)	(0)
Kent State University	Golden Flashes	Memorial Athletic and Convocation Center	MAC	(7) 1999, 2001, 2002, 2006, 2008, 2017, 2023	(0)	(0)
University of Massachusetts Amherst (UMass)	Minutemen	Mullins Center	MAC	(9) 1962, 1992, 1993, 1994, 1995, 1996*, 1997, 1998, 2014	(1) 1996*	(0)
Miami University (Miami (OH))	RedHawks	Millett Hall	MAC	(18) 1953, 1955, 1957, 1958, 1966, 1969, 1971, 1973, 1978, 1984, 1985, 1986, 1992, 1995, 1997, 1999, 2007, 2026	(0)	(0)
Ohio University	Bobcats	Convocation Center	MAC	(14) 1960, 1961, 1964, 1965, 1970, 1972, 1974, 1983, 1985, 1994, 2005, 2010, 2012, 2021	(0)	(0)
University of Toledo	Rockets	Savage Arena	MAC	(4) 1954, 1967, 1979, 1980	(0)	(0)
Western Michigan University	Broncos	University Arena	MAC	(4) 1976, 1998, 2004, 2014	(0)	(0)
Coppin State University	Eagles	Physical Education Complex	MEAC	(4) 1990, 1993, 1997, 2008	(0)	(0)
Delaware State University	Hornets	Memorial Hall	MEAC	(1) 2005	(0)	(0)
Howard University	Bison	Burr Gymnasium	MEAC	(5) 1981, 1992, 2023, 2024, 2026	(0)	(0)
University of Maryland Eastern Shore (UMES)	Hawks	Hytche Athletic Center	MEAC	(0)	(0)	(0)
Morgan State University	Bears	Talmadge L. Hill Field House	MEAC	(2) 2009, 2010	(0)	(0)
Norfolk State University	Spartans	Joseph G. Echols Memorial Hall	MEAC	(4) 2012, 2021, 2022, 2025	(0)	(0)
North Carolina Central University (NCCU)	Eagles	McLendon–McDougald Gymnasium	MEAC	(4) 2014, 2017, 2018, 2019	(0)	(0)
South Carolina State University (SC State)	Bulldogs	SHM Memorial Center	MEAC	(5) 1989, 1996, 1998, 2000, 2003	(0)	(0)
Belmont University	Bruins	Curb Event Center	Missouri Valley	(8) 2006, 2007, 2008, 2011, 2012, 2013, 2015, 2019	(0)	(0)
Bradley University	Braves	Carver Arena	Missouri Valley	(9) 1950, 1954, 1955, 1980, 1986, 1988, 1996, 2006, 2019	(2) 1950, 1954	(0)
Drake University	Bulldogs	Knapp Center	Missouri Valley	(8) 1969, 1970, 1971, 2008, 2021, 2023, 2024, 2025	(1) 1969	(0)
University of Evansville	Purple Aces	Ford Center	Missouri Valley	(5) 1982, 1989, 1992, 1993, 1999	(0)	(0)
Illinois State University	Redbirds	Redbird Arena	Missouri Valley	(6) 1983, 1984, 1985, 1990, 1997, 1998	(0)	(0)
Indiana State University	Sycamores	Hulman Center	Missouri Valley	(4) 1979, 2000, 2001, 2011	(1) 1979	(0)
Murray State University	Racers	CFSB Center	Missouri Valley	(18) 1964, 1969, 1988, 1990, 1991, 1992, 1995, 1997, 1998, 1999, 2002, 2004, 2006, 2010, 2012, 2018, 2019, 2022	(0)	(0)
University of Northern Iowa (UNI)	Panthers	McLeod Center	Missouri Valley	(9) 1990, 2004, 2005, 2006, 2009, 2010, 2015, 2016, 2026	(0)	(0)
Southern Illinois University Carbondale (Southern Illinois, SIU)	Salukis	Banterra Center	Missouri Valley	(10) 1977, 1993, 1994, 1995, 2002, 2003, 2004, 2005, 2006, 2007	(0)	(0)
University of Illinois Chicago (UIC)	Flames	Credit Union 1 Arena	Missouri Valley	(3) 1998, 2002, 2004	(0)	(0)
Valparaiso University (Valpo)	Beacons	Athletics–Recreation Center	Missouri Valley	(9) 1996, 1997, 1998, 1999, 2000, 2002, 2004, 2013, 2015	(0)	(0)
United States Air Force Academy (Air Force)	Falcons	Clune Arena	Mountain West	(4) 1960, 1962, 2004, 2006	(0)	(0)
Grand Canyon University	Antelopes	Global Credit Union Arena	Mountain West	(4) 2021, 2023, 2024, 2025	(0)	(0)
University of Hawaiʻi at Mānoa (Hawaii)	Rainbow Warriors	Stan Sheriff Center	Mountain West	(6) 1972, 1994, 2001, 2002, 2016, 2026	(0)	(0)
University of Nevada, Reno (Nevada, UNR)	Wolf Pack	Lawlor Events Center	Mountain West	(11) 1984, 1985, 2004, 2005, 2006, 2007, 2017, 2018, 2019, 2023, 2024	(0)	(0)
University of New Mexico (UNM)	Lobos	Dreamstyle Arena	Mountain West	(17) 1968, 1974, 1978, 1991, 1993, 1994, 1996, 1997, 1998, 1999, 2005, 2010, 2012, 2013, 2014, 2024, 2025	(0)	(0)
San Jose State University	Spartans	Provident Credit Union Event Center	Mountain West	(3) 1951, 1980, 1996	(0)	(0)
University of California, Davis (UC Davis)	Aggies	University Credit Union Center	Mountain West	(1) 2017	(0)	(0)
University of Nevada, Las Vegas (UNLV)	Runnin' Rebels	Thomas & Mack Center	Mountain West	(20) 1975, 1976, 1977, 1983, 1984, 1985, 1986, 1987, 1988, 1989, 1990, 1991, 1998, 2000, 2007, 2008, 2010, 2011, 2012, 2013	(4) 1977, 1987, 1990, 1991	(1) 1990
University of Texas at El Paso (UTEP)	Miners	Don Haskins Center	Mountain West	(17) 1963, 1964, 1966, 1967, 1970, 1975, 1984, 1985, 1986, 1987, 1988, 1989, 1990, 1992, 2004, 2005, 2010	(1) 1966	(1) 1966
University of Wyoming	Cowboys	Arena-Auditorium	Mountain West	(16) 1941, 1943, 1947, 1948, 1949, 1952, 1953, 1958, 1967, 1981, 1982, 1987, 1988, 2002, 2015, 2022	(1) 1943	(1) 1943
Central Connecticut State University (Central Connecticut)	Blue Devils	William H. Detrick Gymnasium	NEC	(3) 2000, 2002, 2007	(0)	(0)
Chicago State University	Cougars	Emil and Patricia Jones Convocation Center	NEC	(0)	(0)	(0)
Fairleigh Dickinson University	Knights	Rothman Center	NEC	(7) 1985, 1988, 1998, 2005, 2016, 2019, 2023	(0)	(0)
Le Moyne College	Dolphins	Ted Grant Court	NEC	(0)	(0)	(0)
Long Island University (LIU)	Sharks	Steinberg Wellness Center	NEC	(8) 1981, 1984, 1997, 2011, 2012, 2013, 2018, 2026	(0)	(0)
Mercyhurst University (Note: Began transition from Division II in 2024.)	Lakers	Mercyhurst Athletic Center	NEC	(0)	(0)	(0)
University of New Haven (Note: Began transition from Division II in 2025.)	Chargers	Jeffrey P. Hazell Athletics Center	NEC	(0)	(0)	(0)
Stonehill College	Skyhawks	Merkert Gymnasium	NEC	(0)	(0)	(0)
Wagner College	Seahawks	Spiro Sports Center	NEC	(2) 2003, 2024	(0)	(0)
Eastern Illinois University	Panthers	Lantz Arena	Ohio Valley	(2) 1992, 2001	(0)	(0)
Lindenwood University	Lions	Robert F. Hyland Performance Arena	Ohio Valley	(0)	(0)	(0)
Morehead State University	Eagles	Ellis Johnson Arena	Ohio Valley	(9) 1956, 1957, 1961, 1983, 1984, 2009, 2011, 2021, 2024	(0)	(0)
Southeast Missouri State University (Southeast Missouri or SEMO)	Redhawks	Show Me Center	Ohio Valley	(2) 2000, 2023	(0)	(0)
Southern Illinois University Edwardsville (SIU Edwardsville or SIUE)	Cougars	Vadalabene Center	Ohio Valley	(1) 2025	(0)	(0)
University of Southern Indiana	Screaming Eagles	Liberty Arena, Home of the Screaming Eagles (Note: Not to be confused with Liberty Arena at Liberty University.)	Ohio Valley	(0)	(0)	(0)
University of Tennessee at Martin (UT Martin)	Skyhawks	Tom and Kathleen Elam Center	Ohio Valley	(0)	(0)	(0)
Tennessee State University	Tigers	Gentry Complex	Ohio Valley	(3) 1993, 1994, 2026	(0)	(0)
Western Illinois University	Leathernecks	Western Hall	Ohio Valley	(0)	(0)	(0)
Boise State University	Broncos	ExtraMile Arena	Pac-12	(10) 1976, 1988, 1993, 1994, 2008, 2013, 2015, 2022, 2023, 2024	(0)	(0)
Colorado State University	Rams	Moby Arena	Pac-12	(13) 1954, 1963, 1965, 1966, 1969, 1989, 1990, 2003, 2012, 2013, 2022, 2024, 2025	(0)	(0)
California State University, Fresno (Fresno State)	Bulldogs	Save Mart Center	Pac-12	(6) 1981, 1982, 1984, 2000*, 2001, 2016	(0)	(0)
Gonzaga University	Bulldogs	McCarthey Athletic Center	Pac-12	(28) 1995, 1999, 2000, 2001, 2002, 2003, 2004, 2005, 2006, 2007, 2008, 2009, 2010, 2011, 2012, 2013, 2014, 2015, 2016, 2017, 2018, 2019, 2021, 2022, 2023, 2024, 2025, 2026	(2) 2017, 2021	(0)
Oregon State University	Beavers	Gill Coliseum	Pac-12	(18) 1947, 1949, 1955, 1962, 1963, 1964, 1966, 1975, 1980, 1981, 1982, 1984, 1985, 1988, 1989, 1990, 2016, 2021	(2) 1949, 1963	(0)
San Diego State University (SDSU)	Aztecs	Viejas Arena	Pac-12	(17) 1975, 1976, 1985, 2002, 2006, 2010, 2011, 2012, 2013, 2014, 2015, 2018, 2021, 2022, 2023, 2024, 2025	(1) 2023	(0)
Texas State University	Bobcats	Strahan Coliseum	Pac-12	(2) 1994, 1997	(0)	(0)
Utah State University	Aggies	Smith Spectrum	Pac-12	(26) 1939, 1962, 1963, 1964, 1970, 1971, 1975, 1979, 1980, 1983, 1988, 1998, 2000, 2001, 2003, 2005, 2006, 2009, 2010, 2011, 2019, 2021, 2023, 2024, 2025, 2026	(0)	(0)
Washington State University	Cougars	Beasley Coliseum	Pac-12	(7) 1941, 1980, 1983, 1994, 2007, 2008, 2024	(1) 1941	(0)
American University	Eagles	Bender Arena	Patriot League	(4) 2008, 2009, 2014, 2025	(0)	(0)
United States Military Academy (Army or Army West Point)	Black Knights	Christl Arena	Patriot League	(0)	(0)	(0)
Boston University	Terriers	Case Gym	Patriot League	(7) 1959, 1983, 1988, 1990, 1997, 2002, 2011	(0)	(0)
Bucknell University	Bison	Sojka Pavilion	Patriot League	(8) 1987, 1989, 2005, 2006, 2011, 2013, 2017, 2018	(0)	(0)
Colgate University	Raiders	Cotterell Court	Patriot League	(7) 1995, 1996, 2019, 2021, 2022, 2023, 2024	(0)	(0)
College of the Holy Cross	Crusaders	Hart Center	Patriot League	(13) 1947, 1948, 1950, 1953, 1956, 1977, 1980, 1993, 2001, 2002, 2003, 2007, 2016	(2) 1947, 1948	(1) 1947
Lafayette College	Leopards	Kirby Sports Center	Patriot League	(4) 1957, 1999, 2000, 2015	(0)	(0)
Lehigh University	Mountain Hawks	Stabler Arena	Patriot League	(6) 1985, 1988, 2004, 2010, 2012, 2026	(0)	(0)
Loyola University Maryland (Loyola Maryland)	Greyhounds	Reitz Arena	Patriot League	(2) 1994, 2012	(0)	(0)
United States Naval Academy (Navy)	Midshipmen	Alumni Hall	Patriot League	(11) 1947, 1953, 1954, 1959, 1960, 1985, 1986, 1987, 1994, 1997, 1998	(0)	(0)
University of Alabama	Crimson Tide	Coleman Coliseum	SEC	(27) 1975, 1976, 1982, 1983, 1984, 1985, 1986, 1987, 1989, 1990, 1991, 1992, 1994, 1995, 2002, 2003, 2004, 2005, 2006, 2012, 2018, 2021, 2022, 2023, 2024, 2025, 2026	(1) 2024	(0)
University of Arkansas	Razorbacks	Bud Walton Arena	SEC	(37) 1941, 1945, 1949, 1958, 1977, 1978, 1979, 1980, 1981, 1982, 1983, 1984, 1985, 1988, 1989, 1990, 1991, 1992, 1993, 1994, 1995, 1996, 1998, 1999, 2000, 2001, 2006, 2007, 2008, 2015, 2017, 2018, 2021, 2022, 2023, 2025, 2026	(6) 1941, 1945, 1978, 1990, 1994, 1995	(1) 1994
Auburn University	Tigers	Neville Arena	SEC	(14) 1984, 1985, 1986, 1987, 1988, 1999, 2000, 2003, 2018, 2019, 2022, 2023, 2024, 2025	(2) 2019, 2025	(0)
University of Florida	Gators	Exactech Arena at O'Connell Center	SEC	(26) 1987, 1988, 1989, 1994, 1995, 1999, 2000, 2001, 2002, 2003, 2004, 2005, 2006, 2007, 2010, 2011, 2012, 2013, 2014, 2017, 2018, 2019, 2021, 2024, 2025, 2026	(5) 1994, 2000, 2006, 2007, 2014, 2025	(3) 2006, 2007, 2025
University of Georgia (UGA)	Bulldogs	Stegeman Coliseum	SEC	(14) 1983, 1985*, 1987, 1990, 1991, 1996, 1997, 2001, 2002*, 2008, 2011, 2015, 2025, 2026	(1) 1983	(0)
University of Kentucky (UK)	Wildcats	Rupp Arena	SEC	(64) 1942, 1945, 1948, 1949, 1951, 1952, 1955, 1956, 1957, 1958, 1959, 1961, 1962, 1964, 1966, 1968, 1969, 1970, 1971, 1972, 1973, 1975, 1977, 1978, 1980, 1981, 1982, 1983, 1984, 1985, 1986, 1987, 1988*, 1992, 1993, 1994, 1995, 1996, 1997, 1998, 1999, 2000, 2001, 2002, 2003, 2004, 2005, 2006, 2007, 2008, 2010, 2011, 2012, 2014, 2015, 2016, 2017, 2018, 2019, 2022, 2023, 2024, 2025, 2026	(17) 1942, 1948, 1949, 1951, 1958, 1966, 1975, 1978, 1984, 1993, 1996, 1997, 1998, 2011, 2012, 2014, 2015	(8) 1948, 1949, 1951, 1958, 1978, 1996, 1998, 2012
Louisiana State University (LSU)	Tigers	Pete Maravich Assembly Center	SEC	(24) 1953, 1954, 1979, 1980, 1981, 1984, 1985, 1986, 1987, 1988, 1989, 1990, 1991, 1992, 1993, 2000, 2003, 2005, 2006, 2009, 2015, 2019, 2021, 2022	(4) 1953, 1981, 1986, 2006	(0)
University of Mississippi (Ole Miss)	Rebels	The Sandy and John Black Pavilion at Ole Miss	SEC	(10) 1981, 1997, 1998, 1999, 2001, 2002, 2013, 2015, 2019, 2025	(0)	(0)
Mississippi State University	Bulldogs	Humphrey Coliseum	SEC	(14) 1963, 1991, 1995, 1996, 2002, 2003, 2004, 2005, 2008, 2009, 2019, 2023, 2024, 2025	(1) 1996	(0)
University of Missouri (Mizzou)	Tigers	Mizzou Arena	SEC	(31) 1944, 1976, 1978, 1980, 1981, 1982, 1983, 1986, 1987, 1988, 1989, 1990, 1992, 1993, 1994*, 1995, 1999, 2000, 2001, 2002, 2003, 2009, 2010, 2011, 2012, 2013, 2018, 2021, 2023, 2025, 2026	(0)	(0)
University of Oklahoma	Sooners	Lloyd Noble Center	SEC	(34) 1939, 1943, 1947, 1979, 1983, 1984, 1985, 1986, 1987, 1988, 1989, 1990, 1992, 1995, 1996, 1997, 1998, 1999, 2000, 2001, 2002, 2003, 2005, 2006, 2008, 2009, 2013, 2014, 2015, 2016, 2018, 2019, 2021, 2025	(5) 1939, 1947, 1988, 2002, 2016	(0)
University of South Carolina	Gamecocks	Colonial Life Arena	SEC	(10) 1971, 1972, 1973, 1974, 1989, 1997, 1998, 2004, 2017, 2024	(1) 2017	(0)
University of Tennessee	Volunteers	Thompson–Boling Arena	SEC	(28) 1967, 1976, 1977, 1979, 1980, 1981, 1982, 1983, 1989, 1998, 1999, 2000, 2001, 2006, 2007, 2008, 2009, 2010, 2011, 2014, 2018, 2019, 2021, 2022, 2023, 2024, 2025, 2026	(0)	(0)
University of Texas at Austin (Texas)	Longhorns	Moody Center	SEC	(40) 1939, 1943, 1947, 1960, 1963, 1972, 1974, 1979, 1989, 1990, 1991, 1992, 1994, 1995, 1996, 1997, 1999, 2000, 2001, 2002, 2003, 2004, 2005, 2006, 2007, 2008, 2009, 2010, 2011, 2012, 2014, 2015, 2016, 2018, 2021, 2022, 2023, 2024, 2025, 2026	(3) 1943, 1947, 2003	(0)
Texas A&M University	Aggies	Reed Arena	SEC	(18) 1951, 1964, 1969, 1975, 1980, 1987, 2006, 2007, 2008, 2009, 2010, 2011, 2016, 2018, 2023, 2024, 2025, 2026	(0)	(0)
Vanderbilt University (Vandy)	Commodores	Memorial Gymnasium	SEC	(17) 1965, 1974, 1988, 1989, 1991, 1993, 1997, 2004, 2007, 2008, 2010, 2011, 2012, 2016, 2017, 2025, 2026	(0)	(0)
University of Tennessee at Chattanooga (Chattanooga)	Mocs	McKenzie Arena	Southern	(12) 1981, 1982, 1983, 1988, 1993, 1994, 1995, 1997, 2005, 2009, 2016, 2022	(0)	(0)
The Citadel	Bulldogs	McAlister Field House	Southern	(0)	(0)	(0)
East Tennessee State University (ETSU)	Buccaneers	Freedom Hall Civic Center	Southern	(10) 1968, 1989, 1990, 1991, 1992, 2003, 2004, 2009, 2010, 2017	(0)	(0)
Furman University	Paladins	Timmons Arena	Southern	(8) 1971, 1973, 1974, 1975, 1978, 1980, 2023, 2026	(0)	(0)
Mercer University	Bears	Hawkins Arena	Southern	(3) 1981, 1985, 2014	(0)	(0)
Samford University	Bulldogs	Pete Hanna Center	Southern	(3) 1999, 2000, 2024	(0)	(0)
Tennessee Tech University	Golden Eagles	Eblen Center	Southern	(2) 1958, 1963	(0)	(0)
University of North Carolina at Greensboro (UNCG or UNC Greensboro)	Spartans	Greensboro Coliseum	Southern	(4) 1996, 2001, 2018, 2021	(0)	(0)
Virginia Military Institute (VMI)	Keydets	Cameron Hall	Southern	(3) 1964, 1976, 1977	(0)	(0)
Western Carolina University	Catamounts	Ramsey Center	Southern	(1) 1996	(0)	(0)
Wofford College	Terriers	Jerry Richardson Indoor Stadium	Southern	(6) 2010, 2011, 2014, 2015, 2019, 2025	(0)	(0)
East Texas A&M University	Lions	The Field House	Southland	(0)	(0)	(0)
Houston Christian University (HCU)	Huskies	Sharp Gymnasium	Southland	(1) 1984	(0)	(0)
University of the Incarnate Word (UIW)	Cardinals	McDermott Convocation Center	Southland	(0)	(0)	(0)
Lamar University	Cardinals	Montagne Center	Southland	(6) 1979, 1980, 1981, 1983, 2000, 2012	(0)	(0)
LSU New Orleans	Privateers	Lakefront Arena	Southland	(5) 1987, 1991, 1993, 1996, 2017	(0)	(0)
McNeese State University (McNeese)	Cowboys	The Legacy Center	Southland	(5) 1989, 2002, 2024, 2025, 2026	(0)	(0)
Nicholls State University (Nicholls)	Colonels	Stopher Gymnasium	Southland	(2) 1995, 1998	(0)	(0)
Northwestern State University	Demons	Prather Coliseum	Southland	(3) 2001, 2006, 2013	(0)	(0)
Southeastern Louisiana University	Lions	University Center	Southland	(1) 2005	(0)	(0)
Stephen F. Austin State University (Stephen F. Austin, SFA)	Lumberjacks	William R. Johnson Coliseum	Southland	(5) 2009, 2014, 2015, 2016, 2018	(0)	(0)
Texas A&M University-Corpus Christi	Islanders	American Bank Center	Southland	(3) 2007, 2022, 2023	(0)	(0)
University of Texas Rio Grande Valley (UTRGV)	Vaqueros	UTRGV Fieldhouse	Southland	(0)	(0)	(0)
Alabama Agricultural and Mechanical University (Alabama A&M)	Bulldogs	Alabama A&M Events Center	SWAC	(1) 2005	(0)	(0)
Alabama State University	Hornets	Dunn–Oliver Acadome	SWAC	(5) 2001, 2004, 2009, 2011, 2025	(0)	(0)
Alcorn State University	Braves	Davey Whitney Complex	SWAC	(6) 1980, 1982, 1983, 1984, 1999, 2002	(0)	(0)
University of Arkansas at Pine Bluff (Arkansas–Pine Bluff, UAPB)	Golden Lions	K. L. Johnson Complex	SWAC	(1) 2010	(0)	(0)
Bethune–Cookman University	Wildcats	Moore Gymnasium	SWAC	(0)	(0)	(0)
Florida Agricultural and Mechanical University (Florida A&M, FAMU)	Rattlers	Lawson Multipurpose Center	SWAC	(3) 1999, 2004, 2007	(0)	(0)
Grambling State University	Tigers	Fredrick C. Hobdy Assembly Center	SWAC	(1) 2024	(0)	(0)
Jackson State University	Tigers	Williams Assembly Center	SWAC	(3) 1997, 2000, 2007	(0)	(0)
Mississippi Valley State University	Delta Devils	Harrison HPER Complex	SWAC	(5) 1986, 1992, 1996, 2008, 2012	(0)	(0)
Prairie View A&M University	Panthers	William Nicks Building	SWAC	(3) 1998, 2019, 2026	(0)	(0)
Southern University	Jaguars	F. G. Clark Center	SWAC	(9) 1981, 1985, 1987, 1988, 1989, 1993, 2006, 2013, 2016	(0)	(0)
Texas Southern University	Tigers	Health and Physical Education Arena	SWAC	(11) 1990, 1994, 1995, 2003, 2014, 2015, 2017, 2018, 2021, 2022, 2023	(0)	(0)
University of Missouri–Kansas City (Kansas City)	Roos	Swinney Recreation Center	The Summit	(0)	(0)	(0)
University of North Dakota	Fighting Hawks	Betty Engelstad Sioux Center	The Summit	(1) 2017	(0)	(0)
North Dakota State University (NDSU)	Bison	Bison Sports Arena	The Summit	(5) 2009, 2014, 2015, 2019, 2026	(0)	(0)
University of Nebraska Omaha (Omaha)	Mavericks	Baxter Arena	The Summit	(1) 2025	(0)	(0)
Oral Roberts University	Golden Eagles	Mabee Center	The Summit	(7) 1974, 1984, 2006, 2007, 2008, 2021, 2023	(0)	(0)
University of St. Thomas	Tommies	Lee and Penny Anderson Arena	The Summit	(0)	(0)	(0)
University of South Dakota	Coyotes	Sanford Coyote Sports Center	The Summit	(0)	(0)	(0)
South Dakota State University	Jackrabbits	Frost Arena	The Summit	(7) 2012, 2013, 2016, 2017, 2018, 2022, 2024	(0)	(0)
Appalachian State University	Mountaineers	George M. Holmes Convocation Center	Sun Belt	(3) 1979, 2000, 2021	(0)	(0)
Arkansas State University	Red Wolves	Convocation Center	Sun Belt	(1) 1999	(0)	(0)
Coastal Carolina University	Chanticleers	HTC Center	Sun Belt	(4) 1991, 1993, 2014, 2015	(0)	(0)
Georgia Southern University	Eagles	Hanner Fieldhouse	Sun Belt	(3) 1983, 1987, 1992	(0)	(0)
Georgia State University	Panthers	GSU Sports Arena	Sun Belt	(6) 1991, 2001, 2015, 2018, 2019, 2022	(0)	(0)
James Madison University (JMU)	Dukes	Atlantic Union Bank Center	Sun Belt	(6) 1981, 1982, 1983, 1994, 2013, 2024	(0)	(0)
University of Louisiana at Lafayette (Louisiana)	Ragin' Cajuns	Cajundome	Sun Belt	(9) 1982, 1983, 1992, 1994, 2000, 2004*, 2005*, 2014, 2023	(0)	(0)
University of Louisiana at Monroe (Louisiana–Monroe or ULM)	Warhawks	Fant–Ewing Coliseum	Sun Belt	(7) 1982, 1986, 1990, 1991, 1992, 1993, 1996	(0)	(0)
Louisiana Tech University (alternately LA Tech)	Bulldogs	Thomas Assembly Center	Sun Belt	(5) 1984, 1985, 1987, 1989, 1991	(0)	(0)
Marshall University	Thundering Herd	Cam Henderson Center	Sun Belt	(6) 1956, 1972, 1984, 1985, 1987, 2018	(0)	(0)
Old Dominion University	Monarchs	Chartway Arena	Sun Belt	(12) 1980, 1982, 1985, 1986, 1992, 1995, 1997, 2005, 2007, 2010, 2011, 2019	(0)	(0)
University of South Alabama	Jaguars	Mitchell Center	Sun Belt	(8) 1979, 1980, 1989, 1991, 1997, 1998, 2006, 2008	(0)	(0)
University of Southern Mississippi (Southern Miss)	Golden Eagles	Reed Green Coliseum	Sun Belt	(3) 1990, 1991, 2012	(0)	(0)
Troy University	Trojans	Trojan Arena	Sun Belt	(4) 2003, 2017, 2025, 2026	(0)	(0)
Abilene Christian University	Wildcats	Moody Coliseum	UAC	(2) 2019, 2021	(0)	(0)
Austin Peay State University (Austin Peay)	Governors	F&M Bank Arena	UAC	(7) 1973, 1974, 1987, 1996, 2003, 2008, 2016	(0)	(0)
University of Central Arkansas	Bears	Farris Center	UAC	(0)	(0)	(0)
Eastern Kentucky University	Colonels	Baptist Health Arena	UAC	(8) 1953, 1959, 1965, 1972, 1979, 2005, 2007, 2014	(0)	(0)
University of Arkansas at Little Rock (Little Rock)	Trojans	Jack Stephens Center	UAC	(5) 1986, 1989, 1990, 2011, 2016	(0)	(0)
University of North Alabama	Lions	Flowers Hall	UAC	(0)	(0)	(0)
Tarleton State University (alternately Tarleton)	Texans	EECU Center	UAC	(0)	(0)	(0)
University of Texas at Arlington (UT Arlington)	Mavericks	College Park Center	UAC	(1) 2008	(0)	(0)
University of West Georgia	Wolves	The Coliseum	UAC	(0)	(0)	(0)
University of Denver	Pioneers	Magness Arena	West Coast	(0)	(0)	(0)
Loyola Marymount University	Lions	Gersten Pavilion	West Coast	(5) 1961, 1980, 1988, 1989, 1990	(0)	(0)
University of the Pacific	Tigers	Alex G. Spanos Center	West Coast	(9) 1966, 1967, 1971, 1979, 1997, 2004, 2005, 2006, 2013	(0)	(0)
Pepperdine University	Waves	Firestone Fieldhouse	West Coast	(13) 1944, 1962, 1976, 1979, 1982, 1983, 1985, 1986, 1991, 1992, 1994, 2000, 2002	(0)	(0)
University of Portland	Pilots	Chiles Center	West Coast	(2) 1959, 1996	(0)	(0)
Saint Mary's College of California (Saint Mary's)	Gaels	University Credit Union Pavilion	West Coast	(15) 1959, 1989, 1997, 2005, 2008, 2010, 2012, 2013, 2017, 2019, 2022, 2023, 2024, 2025, 2026	(0)	(0)
University of San Diego	Toreros	Jenny Craig Pavilion	West Coast	(4) 1984, 1987, 2003, 2008	(0)	(0)
University of San Francisco	Dons	The Sobrato Center	West Coast	(16) 1955, 1956, 1957, 1963, 1964, 1965, 1972, 1973, 1974, 1977, 1978, 1979, 1981, 1982, 1998, 2022	(3) 1955, 1956, 1957	(2) 1955, 1956
Santa Clara University	Broncos	Leavey Center	West Coast	(12) 1952, 1953, 1954, 1960, 1968, 1969, 1970, 1987, 1993, 1995, 1996, 2026	(1) 1952	(0)
Seattle University	Redhawks	Climate Pledge Arena/Redhawk Center	West Coast	(11) 1953, 1954, 1955, 1956, 1958, 1961, 1962, 1963, 1964, 1967, 1969	(1) 1958	(0)

== See also ==
- List of current NCAA Division I men's basketball coaches
- List of NCAA Division I basketball arenas
- NCAA Division I men's basketball alignment history
- List of defunct college basketball teams
