= NCAA Division I Football Bowl Subdivision alignment history =

This is a list of NCAA Division I Football Bowl Subdivision alignment history. Teams in italics are no longer in the Football Bowl Subdivision. Teams in bold italics have announced transitions to FBS. The most recent programs to complete an FBS transition are Delaware and Missouri State, which all began their transition in 2024 and become full FBS members in 2026. North Dakota State and Sacramento State are the next schools to complete an FBS transition, starting it in 2026 and slated to complete it in 2028. The most recent school to leave the FBS ranks is Idaho, which downgraded its program to FCS (the Football Championship Subdivision) after the 2017 season.

Notably, Idaho is the only program to voluntarily downgrade from FBS to FCS without extenuating circumstances since the NCAA created those subdivisions in 1978. After the 1981 season, a large number of programs were downgraded from Division I-A (now FBS) to Division I-AA (now FCS) by the NCAA. Two teams that met NCAA requirements to remain in I-A at that time, McNeese and Yale, chose to voluntarily downgrade to align with the rest of their conferences. Most never returned to I-A/FBS, with the most significant exceptions being Cincinnati and most members of the Mid-American Conference, which were reinstated into I-A after only a single season at the I-AA level.

Listings are accurate for the upcoming 2026 college football season. Schools that still compete in NCAA sports are listed with their current athletic brand names, which do not necessarily match those used by past members of FBS and its predecessors during their tenures at that level.

== A ==
- Air Force 1957–present
- Akron 1987–present
- Alabama 1937–1940, 1946–present
- Alcorn State 1977
- Appalachian State 1974–1981, 2014–present
- Arizona 1939–1940, 1946–present
- Arizona State 1946–1948, 1950–1954, 1956–present
- Arkansas 1937–1940, 1946–present
- Arkansas State 1975–1981, 1992–present
- Army 1937–1940, 1946–present
- Auburn 1937–1940, 1946–present

== B ==
- Ball State 1975–81, 1983–present
- Baylor 1937–1940, 1946–present
- Boise State 1996–present
- Boston College 1939–1940, 1946–present
- Boston University 1939–1940, 1947–1965
- Bowling Green 1961–81, 1983–present
- Brown 1937–1940, 1946–1981
- Bucknell 1938–1940, 1946–1947
- Buffalo 1962–1970, 1999–present
- BYU 1938–1940, 1946–present

== C ==
- California 1937–1940, 1946–present
- Cal State Fullerton 1976–1992
- Carnegie Tech 1937–1940 (Note: One of the two predecessors to today's Carnegie Mellon.)
- Case Tech 1948 (Note: One of the two predecessors to today's Case Western Reserve.)
- Centenary 1938–1947
- Central Michigan 1975–present
- Charlotte 2015–present
- Chattanooga 1946–1948, 1950, 1977–1981
- Chicago 1937–1939
- Cincinnati 1946, 1948–1981, 1983–present
- Citadel 1939, 1946–1952, 1959–1981
- Clemson 1937–1940, 1946–present
- Coastal Carolina 2017–present
- Colgate 1937–1940, 1946–1981
- Colorado 1937–1940, 1946–present
- Colorado College 1946–1947
- Colorado State 1940, 1946–present
- Columbia 1938–1940, 1946–1981
- Cornell 1937–1940, 1946–1981
- Creighton 1939–1942

== D ==
- Dartmouth 1937–1940, 1946–1981
- Davidson 1937–1940, 1946–1953, 1967–1976
- Dayton 1956–1976
- **Delaware** 2025–present
- Denver 1940–1960
- Detroit 1939–1964
- Drake 1939–1940, 1946–1958, 1973–1980
- Duke 1937–1940, 1946–present
- Duquesne 1937–1940, 1947–1950

== E ==
- East Carolina 1966–present
- East Tennessee State 1978–1981
- Eastern Michigan 1976–81, 1983–present

== F ==
- FIU 2006–present
- Florida 1937–1940, 1946–present
- Florida Atlantic 2006–present
- Florida State 1955–present
- Fordham 1937–1940, 1946–1954
- Fresno State 1973–present
- Furman 1946–1953, 1955–1957, 1965, 1973–1981

== G ==
- Georgetown 1937–1940, 1946–1950
- George Washington 1939–1966
- Georgia 1937–1940, 1946–present
- Georgia Southern 2014–present
- Georgia State 2013–present
- Georgia Tech 1937–1940, 1946–present
- Gonzaga 1938–1941
- Grambling 1977

== H ==
- Hardin–Simmons 1946–1948, 1950–1962
- Harvard 1937–1940, 1946–1981
- Haskell 1937–1938
- Hawaii 1974–present
- Holy Cross 1938–1940, 1946–1981
- Houston 1949–present

== I ==
- Idaho 1938–1940, 1946–1967, 1969–1977, 1997–2017
- Illinois 1937–1940, 1946–present
- Illinois State 1976–1981
- Indiana 1937–1940, 1946–present
- Indiana State 1976–1981
- Iowa 1937–1940, 1946–present
- Iowa State 1937–1940, 1946–present

== J ==
- Jackson State 1977
- Jacksonville State 2023–present
- James Madison 2022–present

== K ==
- Kansas 1937–1940, 1946–present
- Kansas State 1937–1940, 1946–present
- Kennesaw State 2024–present
- Kent State 1962–1981, 1983–present
- Kentucky 1937, 1940–present

== L ==
- Lafayette 1938–1940, 1946–1950
- Lamar 1974–1981
- Lehigh 1938–1940, 1946–1947
- Liberty 2018–present
- Long Beach State 1973–1991
- Louisiana 1974–present
- Louisiana–Monroe 1975–1981, 1994–present
- Louisiana Tech 1975–1981, 1989–present
- Louisville 1951, 1962–present
- Loyola Marymount 1950–1951
- Loyola (Chicago) 1940
- LSU 1937–1940, 1946–present

== M ==
- Manhattan 1937–1942
- Marquette 1937–1960
- Marshall 1962–1981, 1998–present
- Maryland 1937, 1940, 1946–present
- Massachusetts 2012–present (Note: Alternately branded as UMass.)
- McNeese 1975–1981 (as McNeese State)
- Memphis 1960–present
- Merchant Marine 1946–1947
- Miami (FL) 1946–present
- Miami (OH) 1948–1949, 1961–1981, 1983–present
- Michigan 1937–1940, 1946–present
- Michigan State 1937–1940, 1946–present
- Middle Tennessee 1999–present
- Minnesota 1937–1940, 1946–present
- Mississippi State 1937–1940, 1946–present
- Missouri 1937–1940, 1946–present
- **Missouri State** 2025–present
- Montana 1939–1940, 1946–1962
- Montana State 1946–1948

== N ==
- Navy 1937–1940, 1946–present
- NC State 1940, 1946–present
- Nebraska 1937–1940, 1946–present
- Nevada 1946–1950, 1992–present
- New Hampshire 1940
- New Mexico 1940, 1946–present
- New Mexico State 1946–1947, 1952–1953, 1959–present
- North Carolina 1937–1940, 1946–present
- **North Dakota State** 2026–future
- North Texas 1957–1981, 1995–present
- Northern Arizona 1946–1947
- Northern Colorado 1946–1947 (as Colorado State) (Note: The school now known as Colorado State was known as Colorado A&M from 1935 to 1957.)
- Northern Illinois 1969–1981, 1983–present
- Northwestern 1937–1940, 1946–present
- Northwestern State 1976–1977
- Notre Dame 1937–1940, 1946–present
- NYU 1937–1948, 1951–1952

== O ==
- Ohio 1948, 1961–1981, 1983–present
- Ohio State 1937–1940, 1946–present
- Oklahoma 1937–1940, 1946–present
- Oklahoma State 1939–1940, 1946–present
- Old Dominion 2014–present
- Ole Miss 1937–1940, 1946–present
- Oregon 1937–1940, 1946–present
- Oregon State 1937–1940, 1946–present

== P ==
- Pacific 1950–1960, 1962–1963, 1966, 1969–1995
- Penn 1937–1940, 1946–1981
- Penn State 1938–1940, 1946–present
- Pittsburgh 1937–1940, 1946–present
- Portland 1946–1948
- Princeton 1937–1940, 1946–1981
- Purdue 1937–1940, 1946–present

== R ==
- Rice 1937–1940, 1946–present
- Richmond 1940, 1946–1981
- Rutgers 1946–present

== S ==
- **Sacramento State** 2026–future
- Saint Louis 1940–1949
- Saint Mary's 1937–1940, 1946–1950
- Sam Houston 2023–present
- San Diego State 1969–present
- San Francisco 1940–1951
- San Jose State 1939–1940, 1950–present
- Santa Clara 1937–1942, 1946–1952
- Sewanee 1937
- South Alabama 2012–present
- South Carolina 1939–1940, 1946–present
- South Florida 2001–present
- Southern California 1937–1940, 1946–present (Note: Preferred athletic brand is USC, though the university accepts "Southern California" if needed to distinguish from South Carolina.)
- Southern Illinois 1973–1981
- SMU 1937–1940, 1946–1986, 1989–present
- Southern Miss 1960, 1963–present
- Southern U. 1977
- Stanford 1937–1940, 1946–present
- Syracuse 1937–1940, 1946–present

== T ==
- Tampa 1973–1974
- TCU 1937–1940, 1946–present
- Temple 1938–1940, 1946–1953, 1971–present
- Tennessee 1937–1940, 1946–present
- Tennessee State 1977–1980
- Texas 1937–1940, 1946–present
- Texas A&M 1937–1940, 1946–present
- Texas Southern 1977
- Texas State 2012–present
- Texas Tech 1937–1940, 1946–present
- Toledo 1962–present
- Trinity (TX) 1960
- Troy 2002–present
- Tulane 1937–1940, 1946–present
- Tulsa 1937–1940, 1946–present

== U ==
- UAB 1996–2014, 2017–present
- UCF 1996–present
- UCLA 1937–1940, 1946–present
- UConn 2002–present
- UNLV 1978–present
- UT Arlington 1972–1981 (as Texas–Arlington)
- Utah 1938–1940, 1946–present
- Utah State 1939–1940, 1946–present
- UTEP 1940, 1946–present
- UTSA 2012–present

== V ==
- Vanderbilt 1937–1940, 1946–present
- Villanova 1939–1940, 1946–1980
- Virginia 1940, 1946–present
- Virginia Tech 1940, 1946–present
- VMI 1939–40, 1946–81

== W ==
- Wake Forest 1939–1940, 1946–present
- Washington 1937–1940, 1946–present
- Washington (MO) 1937–1940
- Washington & Lee 1940, 1946–1953
- Washington State 1937–1940, 1946–present
- West Texas A&M 1946–1947, 1951–1953, 1958–1980 (as West Texas State)
- West Virginia 1939–1940, 1946–present
- Western Carolina 1977–1981
- Western Kentucky 2008–present
- Western Michigan 1962–present
- Wichita State 1946–1986
- William & Mary 1940, 1946–1981
- Wisconsin 1937–1940, 1946–present
- Wyoming 1940, 1946–present

== X ==
- Xavier 1960–1973

== Y ==
- Yale 1937–1940, 1946–1981

== See also ==
- NCAA Division I men's basketball alignment history
- NCAA Division I Football Championship Subdivision alignment history
