= NCAA Division I Football Championship Subdivision alignment history =

This article depicts the NCAA Football Championship Subdivision Alignment History—specifically, all schools that have competed in the lower tier of NCAA Division I college football since Division I football was split into two subdivisions in 1978. This includes schools competing in:

- Division I-AA from 1978 through 2005
- Division I FCS since 2006

Teams in bold italics are now in the Football Bowl Subdivision (FBS); those in plain italics either play football in lower divisions or not at all. Teams followed by an asterisk (*) dropped football.

Dates reflect when a team began play in I-AA/FCS, not when it became eligible for postseason play.

As of the coming 2026 season, two schools are transitioning from FCS to FBS, and one has added football. North Dakota State will start its transition in 2026, playing that season in the Mountain West (MW) without playoff eligibility before becoming a full member in 2027. Sacramento State also starts its own transition, playing that season in the Mid-American Conference (MAC) without playoff eligibility before gaining full membership the next year. Chicago State launched its team for the first time, competing as an FCS independent before joining the NEC also in 2027.

The most recent schools to complete transitions did so in advance of the 2025 season. Delaware and Missouri State both began FBS transitions in 2024, with Delaware and Missouri State joining CUSA the next year, when they were ineligible for bowls.

Idaho downgraded its football team from FBS to FCS, and rejoined its all-sports home of the Big Sky Conference as a football member in July 2018. Also in July 2018, North Alabama started a transition from NCAA Division II, joining the Atlantic Sun Conference (then known as the ASUN Conference) for non-football sports at that time, with the football team playing as an FCS independent in 2018 before joining the Big South Conference in 2019.

Two teams joined the FCS ranks in 2020—Dixie State, now known as Utah Tech, and Tarleton. Both schools started transitions to Division I, with the football teams becoming FCS independents while all other sports joined the non-football Western Athletic Conference. The WAC reinstated football at the FCS level for the fall 2021 season, coinciding with the arrival of four schools from the Southland Conference. UTRGV, currently a full WAC member without football, initially announced it would start an FCS football program no later than 2024, but made that an exhibition season before full varsity play in 2025.

The next school to join FCS was St. Thomas, which joined the non-football Summit League and the Pioneer Football League in 2021 as part of an unprecedented transition directly from Division III to Division I. A year later, three other schools joined FCS as part of transitions from Division II, namely Lindenwood, Stonehill, and East Texas A&M, then known as Texas A&M–Commerce. Augustana University, a South Dakota D-II school not to be confused with the D-III Augustana College in Illinois, announced plans to transition to D-I, but was turned down by the Summit League.

Mercyhurst and West Georgia announced they would start their own transitions from D-II to FCS in 2024, followed by New Haven in 2025, and West Florida in 2026.

Most recently, Saint Francis (PA) announced it would downgrade its football and all athletic programs directly from Division I to Division III in 2026.

School names reflect those in current use, not necessarily those used by a school when it competed in I-AA/FCS. Specifically, these schools were known by different names throughout their entire tenures in Division I-AA/FCS:

- Louisiana–Monroe — Northeast Louisiana
- Troy — Troy State
- UConn — Connecticut
  - In the case of UConn, "Connecticut" was the official athletic name, but "UConn" was in wide use alongside "Connecticut" before becoming the university's sole athletic brand in 2013.
- UMass — Massachusetts
- UT Arlington — Texas–Arlington
- West Texas A&M — West Texas State
- Winston-Salem State — Winston-Salem

Alignments are current for the 2026 season.

== A ==
- Abilene Christian 2013–present
- Alabama A&M 1999–present
- **Akron 1980–1986**
- Alabama State 1982–present
- Albany 1999–present
- Alcorn State 1978–present
- **Appalachian State 1982–2013**
- Arkansas-Pine Bluff 1998–present
- **Arkansas State 1982–1991**
- Austin Peay 1978–present

== B ==
- **Ball State 1982**
- Bethune–Cookman 1980–present
- **Boise State 1978–1995**
- Boston University* 1978–1997
- **Bowling Green 1982**
- Brown 1982–present
- Bryant 2008–present
- Bucknell 1978–present
- **Buffalo 1993–1998**
- Butler 1993–present

== C ==
- UC Davis 2007–present
- Cal Poly 1994–present
- Cal State Northridge* 1993–2001
- Campbell 2008–present
- Canisius* 1993–2002
- Central Arkansas 2006–present
- Central Connecticut 1993–present
- **UCF 1990–1995**
- Charleston Southern 1993–present
- **Charlotte 2013–2014**
- Chattanooga 1982–present
- Chicago State 2026–future
- The Citadel 1982–present
- **Coastal Carolina 2003–2016**
- Colgate 1982–present
- Columbia 1982–present
- Cornell 1982–present

== D ==
- Dartmouth 1982–present
- Davidson 1978-1990, 1993–present
- Dayton 1993–present
- **Delaware 1980–2024**
- Delaware State 1978, 1980–present
- Drake 1981–1985, 1993–present
- Duquesne 1993–present

== E ==
- East Tennessee State 1982–2003, 2015–present
- East Texas A&M 2022–present
- Eastern Illinois 1981–present
- Eastern Kentucky 1978–present
- **Eastern Michigan 1982**
- Eastern Washington 1984–present
- Elon 1999–present
- Evansville* 1993–1997

== F ==
- Fairfield* 1997–2002
- **FIU 2003–2005**
- Florida A&M 1979–present
- **Florida Atlantic 2001–2004**
- Fordham 1989–present
- Furman 1982–present

== G ==
- Gardner–Webb 2002–present
- Georgetown 1993–present
- **Georgia Southern 1984–2013**
- **Georgia State 2010–2012**
- Grambling 1978–present

== H ==
- Hampton 1997–present
- Harvard 1982–present
- Hofstra* 1993–2009
- Holy Cross 1982–present
- Houston Christian 2013–present
- Howard 1978, 1980–present

== I ==
- Idaho 1978–1995, 2018–present
- Idaho State 1978–present
- Illinois State 1982–present
- Incarnate Word 2013–present
- Indiana State 1982–present
- Iona* 1993–2008

== J ==
- Jackson State 1978–present
- Jacksonville* 1998–2019
- **Jacksonville State 1997–2022**
- **James Madison 1980–2021**

== K ==
- **Kennesaw State 2015–2023**
- **Kent State 1982**

== L ==
- Lamar 1982–1989, 2010–present
- La Salle* 1997–2007
- Lafayette 1978–present
- Lehigh 1978–present
- **Liberty 1989–2017**
- Lindenwood 2022–present
- LIU 2019–present
- **Louisiana–Monroe 1982–1993**
- **Louisiana Tech 1982–1988**

== M ==
- Maine 1978–present
- Marist 1993–present
- **Marshall 1982–1996**
- McNeese 1982–present
- Mercyhurst 2024–present
- Merrimack 2019–present
- **Middle Tennessee 1978–1998**
- Mississippi Valley State 1980–present
- **Missouri State 1982–2024**
- Monmouth 1994–present
- Montana 1978–present
- Montana State 1978–present
- Morris Brown* 2001–2002
- Morehead State 1978–present
- Morgan State 1986–present
- Murray State 1978–present

== N ==
- **Nevada 1978–1991**
- New Hampshire 1978–present
- New Haven 2025–present
- Nicholls 1980–present
- Norfolk State 1997–present
- North Alabama 2018–present
- North Carolina A&T 1978–present
- North Carolina Central 2011-present
- North Dakota 2008–present
- **North Dakota State 2004–2025**
- **North Texas 1982–1994**
- Northeastern* 1978–2009
- Northern Arizona 1978–present
- Northern Colorado 2007–present
- **Northern Illinois 1982**
- Northern Iowa 1981–present
- Northwestern State 1978–present

== O ==
- **Ohio 1982**
- **Old Dominion 2009–2013**

== P ==
- Penn 1982–present
- Portland State 1978–1980, 1998–present
- Prairie View A&M 1978–present
- Presbyterian 2007–present
- Princeton 1982–present

== R ==
- Rhode Island 1978–present
- Richmond 1982–present
- Robert Morris 1998–present

== S ==
- **Sacramento State 1993–2025**
- Sacred Heart 1999–present
- Saint Francis (PA) 1993–2025
- St. John's (NY)* 1993–2002
- Saint Mary's (CA)* 1993–2003
- Saint Peter's* 1993–2006
- St. Thomas 2021–present
- **Sam Houston 1986–2022**
- Samford 1989–present
- San Diego 1993–present
- Savannah State 2002–2018
- Siena* 1993–2003
- **South Alabama 2011**
- South Carolina State 1978, 1980–present
- South Dakota 2008–present
- South Dakota State 2004–present
- **South Florida 1997–2000**
- Southeast Missouri State 1990–present
- Southeastern Louisiana 1980–1985, 2003–present
- Southern U. 1978–present
- Southern Illinois 1982–present
- Southern Utah 1993–present
- Stephen F. Austin 1986–present
- Stetson 2013-present
- Stonehill 2022–present
- Stony Brook 1999–present

== T ==
- Tarleton State 2020–present
- Tennessee State 1981–present
- Tennessee Tech 1978–present
- Texas Southern 1978–present
- **Texas State 1984–2011**
- Towson 1987–present
- **Troy 1993–2001**

== U ==
- **UAB 1993–1995**
- **UConn 1978–2001**
- **UMass 1978–2011**
- UT Arlington* 1982–1985
- UT Martin 1992–present
- Utah Tech 2020–present
- UTRGV 2025–present
- **UTSA 2011**

== V ==
- Valparaiso 1993–present
- Villanova 1987–present
- VMI 1982–present

== W ==
- Wagner 1993–present
- Weber State 1978–present
- West Florida 2026–future
- West Georgia 2024–present
- West Texas A&M 1982–1985
- Western Carolina 1982–present
- Western Illinois 1981–present
- **Western Kentucky 1978–2007**
- William & Mary 1982–present
- Winston-Salem 2006–2009
- Wofford 1995–present

== Y ==
- Yale 1982–present
- Youngstown State 1981–present

== See also ==
- NCAA Division I men's basketball alignment history
- NCAA Division I Football Bowl Subdivision alignment history
