= NCAA Division I men's basketball alignment history =

This is an NCAA Division I men's basketball alignment history. NCAA Division I is the highest level of competition in the National Collegiate Athletic Association, the main governing body for U.S. college sports.

For its first half-century of existence, the NCAA, founded in 1906 as the Intercollegiate Athletic Association of the United States and adopting its current name in 1910, was a single body for competitive purposes. It did not split into separate divisions for competition and governance purposes until 1956, when it established the University Division and College Division. In 1973, the University Division was renamed Division I, while the College Division was split into today's Divisions II and III. However, the NCAA now considers the 1947–48 season as the first in which an equivalent to today's Division I existed in basketball. This particular season was the first in which the Associated Press published college basketball rankings, with the news service choosing to publish separate rankings for what it called "major colleges" and "small colleges". The AP's "major colleges" of 1948 correspond directly to today's Division I, with "small colleges" corresponding to today's Divisions II and III.

Teams in italics are no longer in Division I. Seasons are listed by the calendar year in which they end—for example, if a school's first Division I season was the 1991–92 school year, it will be listed as having begun in 1992.

Dates used reflect when the school first became eligible for NCAA-sponsored postseason play—either the NCAA tournament for men or women, the NIT since it was acquired by the NCAA in 2005, or the WBIT upon its launch in 2024. Note that it is possible for a school that is not eligible for NCAA postseason play to play in a tournament not operated by that organization. For example, South Dakota State's women's team, which was not eligible to compete in the NCAA tournament until 2009, played in the WNIT, which is not an NCAA-controlled tournament, in 2007 and 2008. Similarly, the Omaha men's team played in the 2014 CIT before becoming eligible for NCAA postseason play in 2016. The Tarleton State men's team played in the 2023 CBI and the 2024 CIT before becoming eligible for NCAA postseason play in 2025.

School names listed here reflect those in current use, which do not always reflect names used in an institution's earlier history.

== A ==
- Abilene Christian 1971–1973, 2018–present
- Air Force 1958–present
- Akron 1948–1950, 1981–present
- Alabama 1948–present
- Alabama A&M 2000–present
- Alabama State 1983–present
- Albany 2000–present
- Alcorn State 1978–present
- American 1967–present
- Appalachian State 1974–present
- Arizona 1948, 1951–present
- Arizona State 1951–present
- Arkansas 1948–present
- Arkansas–Pine Bluff 1999–present
- Arkansas State 1971–present
- Armstrong Atlantic 1983–1987
- Army 1948–present
- Auburn 1948–present
- Augusta State 1984–1990
- Austin Peay 1964–present

== B ==
- Baldwin Wallace 1948–1953
- Ball State 1970–present
- Baltimore 1979–1983
- Baylor 1948–present
- Bellarmine 2025–present
- Belmont 2000–present
- Bethune–Cookman 1981–present
- Binghamton 2002–present
- Birmingham–Southern 2004–2006
- Boise State 1972–present
- Boston College 1948–present
- Boston University 1948–1949, 1958–present
- Bowling Green 1948–present
- Bradley 1948–present
- Brooklyn 1948–1949, 1983–1992
- Brown 1948–present
- Bryant 2013–present
- Bucknell 1948–present
- Buffalo 1974–1977, 1992–present
- Butler 1948–present
- BYU 1948–present

== C ==
- California 1948–present
- California Baptist 2023–present
- Cal Poly 1995–present
- Cal State Fullerton 1975–present
- Cal State Los Angeles 1971–1975
- Cal State Northridge 1991–present
- Campbell 1978–present
- Canisius 1948–present
- Catholic 1977–1981
- CCNY 1948–1953
- Centenary (LA) 1960–2011
- Central Arkansas 2011–present
- Central Connecticut 1987–present
- Central Michigan 1974–present
- Charleston 1992–present
- Charleston Southern 1975–present
- Charlotte 1973–present
- Chattanooga 1978–present
- Chicago State 1985–present
- Cincinnati 1948–present
- Citadel 1948–present
- Clemson 1948–present
- Cleveland State 1973–present
- Coastal Carolina 1987–present
- Colgate 1948–present
- Colorado 1948–present
- Colorado State 1948–present
- Columbia 1948–present
- Coppin State 1986–present
- Cornell 1948–present
- Creighton 1948–56, 1960–present
- CSU Bakersfield 2011–present

== D ==
- Dartmouth 1948–present
- Davidson 1948–present
- Dayton 1948–present
- Delaware 1958–present
- Delaware State 1974–present
- Denver 1948–80, 1999–present
- DePaul 1948–present
- Detroit Mercy 1948–present
- Drake 1948–present
- Drexel 1974–present
- Duke 1948–present
- Duquesne 1948–present

== E ==
- East Carolina 1965–present
- East Tennessee State 1959–present
- East Texas A&M 2026–present
- Eastern Illinois 1982–present
- Eastern Kentucky 1948, 1952–present
- Eastern Michigan 1974–present
- Eastern Washington 1984–present
- Elon 2000–present
- Evansville 1978–present

== F ==
- Fairfield 1965–present
- Fairleigh Dickinson 1968–present
- FIU 1988–present
- Florida 1948–present
- Florida A&M 1979–present
- Florida Atlantic 1994–present
- Florida Gulf Coast 2012–present
- Florida State 1957–present
- Fordham 1948–present
- Fresno State 1956–1958, 1971–present
- Furman 1948–present

== G ==
- Gardner–Webb 2003–present
- George Mason 1979–present
- George Washington 1948–present
- Georgetown 1948–present
- Georgia 1948–present
- Georgia Southern 1974–present
- Georgia State 1974–present
- Georgia Tech 1948–present
- Gettysburg 1948–51, 1959–73
- Gonzaga 1953–present
- Grambling 1978–present
- Grand Canyon 2018–present
- Green Bay 1982–present

== H ==
- Hamline 1948–48
- Hampton 1996–present
- Hardin–Simmons 1951–63, 1965–90
- Hartford 1985–2023
- Harvard 1948–present
- Hawaiʻi 1971–present
- High Point 2000–present
- Hofstra 1967–present
- Holy Cross 1948–present
- Houston 1951–present
- Houston Christian 1974–89, 2012–present
- Howard 1974–present

== I ==
- Idaho 1948–present
- Idaho State 1959–present
- Illinois 1948–present
- Illinois State 1972–present
- Incarnate Word 2018–present
- Indiana 1948–present
- Indiana State 1948, 1969–present
- Iona 1954–present
- Iowa 1948–present
- Iowa State 1948–present
- IU Indy 1999–present (Note: The Indiana University and Purdue University dissolved Indiana University–Purdue University Indianapolis (IUPUI) at the end of the 2023–24 academic year in favor of separate IU- and Purdue-affiliated institutions. The athletic program transferred to the new IU Indianapolis, which inherited the vast majority of IUPUI's continuing student population and uses the athletic identity IU Indy.)

== J ==
- Jackson State 1978–present
- Jacksonville 1967–present
- Jacksonville State 1996–present
- James Madison 1977–present
- John Carroll 1948–55

== K ==
- Kansas 1948–present
- Kansas City 1990–present
- Kansas State 1948–present
- Kennesaw State 2010–present
- Kent State 1948, 1952–present
- Kentucky 1948–52, 1954–present
- Kentucky Wesleyan 1957–58

== L ==
- La Salle 1948–present
- Lafayette 1948–present
- Lamar 1970–present
- Lawrence Tech 1948
- Lehigh 1948–present
- Le Moyne 2027–future
- Liberty 1989–present
- Lindenwood 2026–present
- Lipscomb 2004–present
- Little Rock 1979–present
- LIU 1948–51, 1969–present (Note: Before the 2019–20 academic year, Long Island University operated two athletic programs. The program of the Brooklyn campus, historically known as "Long Island", "LIU", and finally as "LIU Brooklyn", was classified as a "major college" program before the basketball team was shut down in the wake of a point-shaving scandal, and returned to the University Division (the predecessor to Division I) in 1969. In July 2019, LIU merged the Brooklyn athletic program with the Division II program of its Post campus. The unified LIU program inherited the Division I membership of the Brooklyn campus.)
- Long Beach State 1970–present
- Longwood 2008–present
- Louisiana 1972–73, 1976–present
- Louisiana–Monroe 1974–present
- Louisiana Tech 1974–present
- Louisville 1948–present
- Loyola Chicago 1948–present
- Loyola Marymount 1950–present
- Loyola (LA) 1952–53, 1955–72
- Loyola (MD) 1948–50, 1982–present
- LSU 1948–present
- LSU New Orleans 1976–present (Note: Known as New Orleans before 2026.)

== M ==
- Maine 1962–present
- Manhattan 1948–present
- Marist 1982–present
- Marquette 1948–present
- Marshall 1948, 1954–present
- Maryland 1948–present
- Maryland Eastern Shore 1974–75, 1982–present
- Massachusetts 1962–present
- McNeese 1974–present
- Memphis 1956–present
- Mercer 1974–present
- Mercyhurst 2029–future
- Merrimack 2024–present
- Miami (FL) 1949–53, 1955–71, 1986–present
- Miami (OH) 1948–present
- Michigan 1948–present
- Michigan State 1948–present
- Middle Tennessee 1959–present
- Milwaukee 1974–80, 1991–present
- Minnesota 1948–present
- Mississippi 1948–present
- Mississippi State 1948–present
- Mississippi Valley State 1980–present
- Missouri 1948–present
- Missouri State 1983–present
- Monmouth 1984–present
- Montana 1948, 1952–present
- Montana State 1948, 1958–present
- Morehead State 1956–present
- Morgan State 1985–present
- Morris Brown 2002–03
- Mount Saint Mary's 1989–present
- Muhlenberg 1948–63
- Murray State 1954–present

== N ==
- Navy 1948–present
- Nebraska 1948–present
- Nevada 1948, 1970–present
- New Hampshire 1962–present
- NJIT 2010–present
- New Haven 2029–future
- New Mexico 1951–present
- New Mexico State 1951–present
- Niagara 1948–present
- Nicholls 1981–present
- Norfolk State 1998–present
- North Alabama 2023–present
- North Carolina 1948–present
- North Carolina Central 2012–present
- North Carolina A&T 1974–present
- North Carolina State 1948–present
- North Dakota 2013–present
- North Dakota State 2009–present
- North Florida 2010–present
- North Texas 1958–present
- Northeastern 1973–present
- Northeastern Illinois 1991–98
- Northern Arizona 1951–53, 1972–present
- Northern Colorado 1974–78, 2008–present
- Northern Illinois 1968–present
- Northern Iowa 1981–present
- Northern Kentucky 2012–present
- Northwestern 1948–present
- Northwestern State 1977–present
- Notre Dame 1948–present
- NYU 1948–71; 1984

== O ==
- Oakland 2000–present
- Ohio 1948–present
- Ohio State 1948–present
- Oklahoma 1948–present
- Oklahoma City 1951–85
- Oklahoma State 1948–present
- Old Dominion 1977–present
- Omaha 2015–present
- Oral Roberts 1972–89, 1994–present
- Oregon 1948–present
- Oregon State 1948–present

== P ==
- Pacific 1954–present
- Penn 1948–present
- Penn State 1948–present
- Pepperdine 1956–present
- Pittsburgh 1948–present
- Portland 1954–present
- Portland State 1973–81, 1999–present
- Prairie View A&M 1981–present
- Presbyterian 2013–present
- Princeton 1948–present
- Providence 1949, 1958–present
- Purdue 1948–present
- Purdue Fort Wayne 2003–present (Note: Purdue Fort Wayne did not exist as a standalone institution until 2018. It inherited the athletic program of the former Indiana University – Purdue University Fort Wayne (IPFW), with Purdue Fort Wayne being the larger of IPFW's two spinoff institutions.)

== Q ==
- Queens (NC) 2026–present
- Quinnipiac 1999–present

== R ==
- Radford 1985–present
- Regis 1962–64
- Rhode Island 1948–present
- Rice 1948–present
- Richmond 1948–present
- Rider 1968–present
- Robert Morris 1977–present
- Rutgers 1948–present

== S ==
- Sacramento State 1992–present
- Sacred Heart 2000–present
- St. Bonaventure 1948–present
- St. Francis Brooklyn 1948–2023
- Saint Francis (PA) 1956–2026
- St. John's 1948–present
- Saint Joseph's 1948–present
- Saint Louis 1948–present
- Saint Mary's 1948–present
- Saint Peter's 1965–present
- St. Thomas 2026–present
- Sam Houston 1987–present
- Samford 1973–present
- San Diego 1980–present
- San Diego State 1971–present
- San Francisco 1948–82, 1986–present
- San Jose State 1953–present
- Santa Clara 1948–present
- Savannah State 2003–19
- Scranton 1948
- Seattle 1953–80, 2013–present
- Seton Hall 1948–present
- Siena 1948–49, 1951–60, 1977–present
- SMU 1948–present
- South Alabama 1972–present
- South Carolina 1948–present
- South Carolina State 1974–present
- South Carolina Upstate 2012–present
- South Dakota 2013–present
- South Dakota State 2009–present
- South Florida 1974–present
- Southeast Missouri 1992–present
- Southeastern Louisiana 1981–89, 1991–present
- Southern U. 1978–present
- Southern California 1948–present
- Southern Illinois 1968–present
- Southern Indiana 2026–present
- SIU Edwardsville 2013–present
- Southern Mississippi 1969, 1973–present
- Southern Utah 1989–present
- Stanford 1948–present
- Stephen F. Austin 1987–present
- Stetson 1972–present
- Stonehill 2026–present
- Stony Brook 2000–present
- Syracuse 1948–present

== T ==
- Tarleton State 2025–present
- TCU 1948–present
- Temple 1948–present
- Tennessee 1948–present
- Tennessee–Martin 1993–present
- Tennessee State 1978–present
- Tennessee Tech 1956–present
- Texas 1948–present
- Texas A&M 1948–present
- Texas A&M–Corpus Christi 1973, 2003–present
- Texas Southern 1978–present
- Texas State 1985–present
- Texas Tech 1951–present
- Texas Wesleyan 1948
- Toledo 1948–present
- Towson 1980–present
- Trinity (TX) 1971–73
- Troy 1994–present
- Tulane 1948–85, 1990–present
- Tulsa 1948–present

== U ==
- UAB 1979–present
- UC Davis 2008–present
- UC Irvine 1978–present
- UC Riverside 2002–present
- UC Santa Barbara 1964–present
- UCSD 2025–present
- UCF 1985–present
- UCLA 1948–present
- UConn 1948, 1952–present
- UIC 1982–present
- UMass Lowell 2018–present
- UMBC 1987–present
- UNC Asheville 1985–present
- UNC Greensboro 1992–present
- UNC Wilmington 1977–present
- UNLV 1970–present
- U.S. International 1982–1991
- UT Arlington 1969–present
- Utah 1948–present
- Utah State 1948–present
- Utah Tech (Note: Known as Dixie State before 2022.) 2025–present
- Utah Valley 2010–present
- UTEP 1951–present
- Utica 1982–87
- UTRGV 1969–present (Note: UTRGV did not begin full operation until 2015, but inherited its athletic program from the University of Texas–Pan American, one of the two institutions that merged to form UTRGV.)
- UTSA 1982–present

== V ==
- Valparaiso 1948–50, 1979–present
- Vanderbilt 1948–present
- VCU 1974–present
- Vermont 1962–present
- Villanova 1948–present
- Virginia 1948–present
- VMI 1948–present
- Virginia Tech 1948–present

== W ==
- Wagner 1977–present
- Wake Forest 1948–present
- Washington 1948–present
- Washington-St. Louis 1948–50, 1954–60
- Washington & Lee 1948–59
- Washington State 1948–present
- Wayne State (NE) 1948–50
- Weber State 1964–present
- West Chester 1974–82
- West Florida 2030–future
- West Georgia 2029–future
- West Texas A&M 1951–86
- West Virginia 1948–present
- Western Carolina 1977–present
- Western Illinois 1982–present
- Western Kentucky 1948–present
- Western Michigan 1948–present
- Western Reserve 1948–1955
- Wichita State 1948–present
- William & Mary 1948–present
- Winston-Salem State 2011 (scheduled) (Note: Winston-Salem State began its four-year transition from Division II during the 2006–07 academic year, and would have become eligible for NCAA postseason play in 2011. However, following the 2009–10 season, the school elected to return to Division II and never became a full, active Division I member.)
- Winthrop 1987–present
- Wisconsin 1948–present
- Wofford 1996–present
- Wright State 1988–present
- Wyoming 1948–present

== X ==
- Xavier 1948–present

== Y ==
- Yale 1948–present
- Youngstown State 1948, 1982–present

== See also ==
- NCAA Division I Football Bowl Subdivision alignment history
- NCAA Division I Football Championship Subdivision alignment history
- List of NCAA Division I men's basketball programs
- List of defunct college basketball teams
