= List of defunct college basketball teams =

This is a list of universities in the United States that sponsored basketball but have discontinued their programs. In general, schools that dropped basketball either did because they closed or discontinued their entire athletic program. The last year they sponsored basketball is included. Last season played in parentheses, categorized by the calendar year in which the last season ended.

Schools are split up based on their athletics affiliation at the time they dropped basketball.

== NCAA Division I ==
- Alliant International University, formerly United States International University (1991)
- University of Baltimore (1983)
- Morris Brown College (2003)
- Northeastern Illinois University (1998)
- St. Francis College (St. Francis Brooklyn, 2023)
- University of Texas–Pan American (2015) – The UTPA athletic program was merged with the NAIA program of University of Texas at Brownsville, creating a single Division I program that now competes as the UTRGV Vaqueros.

== NCAA Division II ==
- Academy of Art University (2025)
- Alderson Broaddus University (2023)
- Alliance University (2023)
- Armstrong State University (2017)
- Brigham Young University–Hawaii (2017)
- Concordia College (New York, 2021)
- Concordia University–Portland (2020)
- Dowling College (2016)
- Holy Names University (2023)
- Knoxville College (1990)
- Limestone University (2025)
- LIU Post (2019) – The LIU Post athletic program was merged with the Division I program of LIU Brooklyn, creating a single Division I program that now competes as the LIU Sharks.
- New York Institute of Technology (2020) - Athletics currently suspended, including men's and women's basketball.
- Notre Dame College (2024)
- Notre Dame de Namur University (2020)
- Saint Joseph's College (Indiana, 2017)
- Saint Paul's College (Virginia, 2011)
- College of Saint Rose (2024)
- Sonoma State University (2025)
- Stony Brook Southampton (2005), formerly LIU's Southampton College
- Urbana University (2020)
- University of the Sciences (USciences, 2022) – Merged into Division I's Saint Joseph's University.

== NCAA Division III ==
- Anna Maria College (2026)
- Becker College (2021)
- Birmingham–Southern College (2024) – also competed in Division I.
- Bishop College (1988)
- Boston State College (1982)
- Bryn Athyn College (2025)
- Cabrini University (2024)
- Cazenovia College (2023)
- Clarks Summit University (2024)
- Daniel Webster College (2017)
- Eastern Nazarene College (2024)
- Finlandia University (2023)
- Fontbonne University (2025)
- Hellenic College (Massachusetts, 1985)
- Johnson & Wales University (Denver, 2020)
- Lowell State College (1975)
- MacMurray College (2020)
- Massachusetts College of Pharmacy and Health Sciences (1999)
- Medaille University (2023)
- Mills College (2022)
- Milton College (1982)
- Mount Ida College (2018)
- National Louis University (late 1990s)
- Newbury College (Massachusetts, 2019)
- New York City College of Technology (2011)
- NYU Poly (2014) – Historically known as the Polytechnic Institute of New York and later Polytechnic University, it merged with New York University in 2008, becoming the Polytechnic Institute of New York University. NYU Poly merged completely into NYU in 2014, becoming the NYU engineering school, with Poly's athletic program being absorbed by NYU's.
- Northland College (Wisconsin, 2025)
- Parks College (1996)
- Pillsbury Baptist Bible College (2008)
- Pine Manor College (2021) – Absorbed into Division I's Boston College.
- Rosemont College (2026)
- Sage College of Albany (2020) – Merged with formerly all-female Russell Sage College, which became co-educational, after The Sage Colleges renamed as Russell Sage.
- St. Francis de Sales College (Wisconsin, 1977)
- Southern Vermont College (2019)
- Spelman College (2013) – Spelman is a women's college.
- Upsala College (1995)
- University of Valley Forge (2026)
- Wells College (2024)
- Wesley College (Delaware, 2021) – Acquired by Division I's Delaware State University.
- Wheelock College (2018)

== NCAA College Division ==
- Parsons College (1973)

== NAIA ==
- AIB College of Business (2015)
- Alaska Pacific University (1990)
- University of Albuquerque (1969) – Also competed in NCAA College Division starting in 1966.
- University of Antelope Valley (2024)
- Ashford University (2016)
- University of Alaska Southeast (1990)
- Bacone College (2024)
- Barat College (2001)
- Bethany University (2011)
- Benedictine University at Springfield (2015)
- Cal Poly Maritime Academy (2026)
- Cascade College (2009)
- Cincinnati Christian University (2019)
- Concordia Senior College (1977)
- Concordia University Ann Arbor (2025)
- Dana College (2010)
- Detroit Institute of Technology (1980)
- DeVry University, formerly DeVry Institute of Technology (Atlanta, Georgia, 1992).
- Dr. Martin Luther College (1995) – Incorporated Northwestern College and became Martin Luther College.
- College of Emporia (1974)
- George Williams College (Chicago, 1985) – Merged with Aurora University in 2000.
- Green Mountain College (2019) – Also competed in NCAA Division III.
- Holy Family College (Wisconsin, 2020)
- Johnson & Wales University (Florida, 2020)
- Huron University, also known as Si Tanka University-Huron (2005)
- Iowa Wesleyan University (2023) – Also competed in NCAA Division III.
- Kendall College (mid-2000s)
- Lambuth University (2011)
- Lindenwood University – Belleville (2020)
- Lourdes University (2026)
- Marycrest International University (2002)
- Marygrove College (2018)
- Mid-Continent University (2014)
- Mount Senario College (2001)
- Mountain State University (2012)
- Multnomah University (2025)
- Mundelein College (1991) – Incorporated into NCAA Division I's Loyola University Chicago.
- Northwestern College (Wisconsin, 1995) – Merged with Dr. Martin Luther College; see above.
- New College of California (1994)
- Northwood University (Florida, 2015) – Sold to Keiser University.
- Northwood University (Texas, 2013)
- Ohio Valley University (2022) – Also competed in NCAA Division II.
- Patten University (2005)
- Phillips University (1998)
- Presentation College (2023) – Also competed in NCAA Division III.
- Providence Christian College (2025)
- Purdue University Calumet (2017) – Merged with Purdue North Central to become Purdue University Northwest.
- Purdue University North Central (2017) – Merged with Purdue Calumet to become Purdue Northwest.
- Robert Morris University Chicago (2020) – Merged into Roosevelt University.
- St. Andrews University (North Carolina, 2025)
- St. Catharine College (2016)
- St. Gregory's University (2017)
- University of Saint Katherine (2024)
- St. Mary of the Plains College (1992)
- Santa Fe University of Art and Design, formerly College of Santa Fe and St. Michael's College (1986)
- Savannah College of Art and Design, Savannah Campus (2009)
- Sheldon Jackson College (1992)
- Siena Heights University (2026)
- University of South Dakota–Springfield (1984)
- Southern Benedictine College, formerly Saint Bernard College (1979)
- Southern Polytechnic State University (2014)
- Tarkio College (1992)
- University of Texas at Brownsville (2015) – Merged with the NCAA Division I athletic program of University of Texas–Pan American; see above.
- Trinity Christian College (2026)
- Trinity International University (2023)
- Trinity Lutheran College (Washington, 2016)
- Victory University, formerly Crichton College (2014)
- Virginia Intermont College (2014)
- Westmar College (1997)
- Yankton College (1984)

== NCCAA ==
- Campbellsville University Harrodsburg (2025)
- Central Bible College (2013)
- Grace University (2018)
- Hiwassee College (2019)
- John Wesley University (2018)
- Tennessee Temple University (2015)

== USCAA ==
- Concordia College Alabama (2018)
- College of New Rochelle (2019) – Also competed in NCAA Division III.
- Robert Morris University Springfield (2019)
- College of St. Joseph (2019)
- Hampshire College (2026)
- Penn State Wilkes-Barre (2026)
- Selma University (2019)
- Stratford University (2019)

== See also ==
- NCAA Division I men's basketball alignment history
- List of defunct college baseball teams
- List of defunct college football teams
- List of defunct college hockey teams
