= 1968 College Baseball All-America Team =

This is a list of college baseball players named first team All-Americans for the 1968 NCAA University Division baseball season. From 1964 to 1980, there were two generally recognized All-America selectors for baseball: the American Baseball Coaches Association and The Sporting News.

== Key ==
A	American Baseball Coaches Association
S	The Sporting News
	Member of the National College Baseball Hall of Fame
	Consensus All-American – selected by both organizations
	Consensus All-American – selected by one organization

== All-Americans ==
Position	Name	School	#	A	S	Other awards and honors
Pitcher	Dave Lemonds	North Carolina	2	✓	✓	The Sporting News Player of the Year
Pitcher	Ray Peters	Harvard	1	—	✓	
Pitcher	Tim Plodinec	Arizona	1	✓	—	
Catcher	Thurman Munson	Kent State	2	✓	✓	
First baseman	Mike Murphy	Ohio	1	✓	—	
First baseman	Bill Seinsoth	USC	1	—	✓	College World Series Most Outstanding Player
Second baseman	Fred Nelson	Arizona State	1	✓	—	
Second baseman	Pat Harrison	USC	1	—	✓	
Shortstop	Rich McKinney	Ohio	1	—	✓	
Shortstop	Danny Thompson	Oklahoma State	1	✓	—	
Third baseman	Steve Garvey	Michigan State	1	—	✓	
Third baseman	Ken Lohnes	Cal State Los Angeles	1	✓	—	
Outfielder	Vince Bigone	Santa Clara	1	✓	—	
Outfielder	Bob Gallagher	Stanford	1	—	✓	
Outfielder	Tom Paciorek	Houston	2	✓	✓	
Outfielder	Larry Pyle	Miami (FL)	1	—	✓	
Outfielder	Jerry Stitt	Arizona	1	✓	—	

== See also ==
- List of college baseball awards
