= 1968 NCAA University Division baseball rankings =

1968 NCAA University Division baseball season

Tournament

College World Series
- Champions: USC
- Runners-up: Southern Illinois
- MOP: Bill Seinsoth (USC)

Seasons
- ← 1967 1969 →

The following poll makes up the 1968 NCAA University Division baseball rankings. Collegiate Baseball Newspaper published its first human poll of the top 20 teams in college baseball in 1957, and expanded to rank the top 30 teams in 1961.

== Collegiate Baseball ==
Currently, only the final poll from the 1968 season is available.

Rank	Team
1	USC
2	Southern Illinois
3	NC State
4	St. John's
5	Oklahoma State
6	Texas
7	BYU
8	Harvard
9	Ohio
10	Minnesota
11	Cal State Los Angeles
12	Florida State
13	NYU
14	Valparaiso
15	Temple
16	Arizona
17	Arizona State
18	Connecticut
19	East Carolina
20	Santa Clara
21	New Mexico
22	Alabama
23	Michigan State
24	Bradley
25	Cal Poly Pomona
26	Stanford
27	Florida
28	Texas–Pan American
29	Rutgers
30	Weber State
