= 1968 St. John's Redmen baseball team =

American college baseball season

1968 St. John's Redmen baseball

District II champions

College World Series, 4th
- Conference: Independent
- Record: 25–10
- Head coach: John Kaiser (13th season)
- Home stadium: Alley Pond Park

The 1968 St. John's Redmen baseball team represented the St. John's University in the 1968 NCAA University Division baseball season. The Redmen played their home games at Alley Pond Park. The team was coached by Jack Kaiser in his St. John's University in his 13th year at St. John's.

The Redmen won District II to advance to the College World Series, where they were defeated by the Southern Illinois Salukis.

== Roster ==
1968 St. John's Redmen baseball team
Players
Coaches

#	Pos.	Name	B/T	Height	Weight	Year	Home town
	C	Ralph Addonizio	R/R	6 ft 0 in (1.83 m)	185 lb (84 kg)	Sr
		Adam Alberico	/	—	—	Sr
		Frank Amoroso	/	—	—
		John Arbucho	/	—	—	So
		Stan Babieracki	/	—	—	Jr
		Larry Bubla	/	—	—	Fr
		Bob Cantono	/	—	—
		Mike Cello	/	—	—	Jr
	INF	Frank Ciaramella	R/R	6 ft 1 in (1.85 m)	190 lb (86 kg)	So
	INF	Dan Colombo	R/R	6 ft 1 in (1.85 m)	180 lb (82 kg)		Floral Park, New York
		Devin Connors	/	—	—
		Sal D'Esposito	/	—	—
		Bob Franks	/	—	—
		Paul Fricchione	/	—	—	Jr
		Wally Gross	/	—	—	Sr
		Jim Healy	/	—	—	Jr
		Bob Hirshfield	/	—	—	So
		Don Lizak	/	—	—	Fr
	INF	Steve Lizak	R/R	5 ft 10 in (1.78 m)	170 lb (77 kg)	Jr
		Jack Lyons	/	—	—	So
		Ken Manfre	/	—	—
		Al Matson	L/R	6 ft 1 in (1.85 m)	170 lb (77 kg)	So
		Bob May	/	—	—
		Bob Morton	/	—	—	Sr
		Albert Moschetti	/	—	—	Sr
	RHP	Augie Napolitano	R/R	6 ft 0 in (1.83 m)	177 lb (80 kg)	So
		Tom Neal	/	—	—	So
		John Pagano	/	—	—	Sr
		Frank Palmieri	/	—	—	Sr
		Ken Ruane	/	—	—
		Chuck Senig	/	—	—
	RHP	Tom Sowinski	R/R	6 ft 2 in (1.88 m)	178 lb (81 kg)	Sr
	LHP	Rick Swartz	L/L	5 ft 10 in (1.78 m)	180 lb (82 kg)	Sr
		Ed Waters	/	—	—	Jr
		Chet Wydrinski	/	—	—	So
		Larry Zepernick	/	—	—	So

Head coach

Jack Kaiser

Assistant coach(es)

Legend

- (C) Team captain
- (S) Suspended
- (I) Ineligible
- Injured
- Current redshirt

== Schedule ==
1968 St. John's Redmen baseball game log
Regular season
March (2–1)

#	Date	Opponent	Site/stadium	Score	Overall record
1	March 26	C.W. Post	Alley Pond Park • New York, New York	3–0	1–0
2	March 27	Colgate	Alley Pond Park • New York, New York	5–3	2–0
3	March 29	at Adelphi	Unknown • Garden City, New York	4–5	2–1

April (11–6)

#	Date	Opponent	Site/stadium	Score	Overall record
4	April 2	Kings Point	Alley Pond Park • New York, New York	3–0	3–1
5	April 3	New Haven	Alley Pond Park • New York, New York	3–2	4–1
6	April 4	Rhode Island	Alley Pond Park • New York, New York	2–1	5–1
7	April 5	Adelphi	Alley Pond Park • New York, New York	5–0	6–1
8	April 6	at St. Francis	Unknown • New York, New York	0–2	6–2
9	April 10	Fordham	Alley Pond Park • New York, New York	1–0	7–2
10	April 11	at C.W. Post	Unknown • New York, New York	1–2	7–3
11	April 13	Manhattan	Alley Pont Park • New York, New York	7–2	8–3
12	April 16	Wagner	Alley Pond Park • New York, New York	6–0	9–3
13	April 17	at Southern Connecticut State	Unknown • New Haven, Connecticut	5–6	9–4
14	April 18	at Princeton	Bill Clarke Field • Princeton, New Jersey	1–2	9–5
15	April 20	LIU	Alley Pond Park • New York, New York	0–1	9–6
16	April 22	Pace	Alley Pond Park • New York, New York	8–1	10–6
17	April 26	Rutgers	Alley Pond Park • New York, New York	1–3	10–7
18	April 27	at Iona	Unknown • New Rochelle, New York	2–1	11–7
19	April 28	at CCNY	Alley Pond Park • New York, New York	10–0	12–7
20	April 29	Bridgeport	Alley Pond Park • New York, New York	4–0	13–7

May (7–1)

#	Date	Opponent	Site/stadium	Score	Overall record
21	May 1	at Hofstra	University Field • Hempstead, New York	7–1	14–7
22	May 3	Fairfield	Alley Pond Park • New York, New York	7–2	15–7
23	May 4	at NYU	Unknown • New York, New York	11–3	16–7
24	May 6	Central Connecticut State	Alley Pond Park • New York, New York	11–9	17–7
25	May 7	at Seton Hall	Owen T. Carroll Field • South Orange, New Jersey	0–3	17–8
26	May 8	at Army	Doubleday Field • West Point, New York	4–0	18–8
27	May 11	at Fairleigh Dickinson	Unknown • Teaneck, New Jersey	5–3	19–8
28	May 14	at Queens College	Unknown • New York, New York	4–0	20–8

Postseason
NCAA District II Playoff (3–0)

#	Date	Opponent	Site/stadium	Score	Overall record
29	May 31	vs Rutgers	Bill Clarke Field • Princeton, New Jersey	12–0	21–8
30	June 1	vs Temple	Bill Clarke Field • Princeton, New Jersey	2–0	22–8
31	June 2	vs NYU	Bill Clarke Field • Princeton, New Jersey	2–0	23–8

College World Series (2–2)

#	Date	Opponent	Site/stadium	Score	Overall record
32	June 10	vs Harvard	Johnny Rosenblatt Stadium • Omaha, Nebraska	2–0	24–8
33	June 12	vs NC State	Johnny Rosenblatt Stadium • Omaha, Nebraska	3–2	25–8
34	June 13	vs Southern California	Johnny Rosenblatt Stadium • Omaha, Nebraska	6–7	25–9
35	June 14	vs Southern Illinois	Johnny Rosenblatt Stadium • Omaha, Nebraska	0–15	25–10

== Awards and honors ==
Ralph Addonizio

- All Tournament Team

Tom Sowinski

- All Tournament Team
