= 1968 NCAA University Division baseball tournament =

American college sports championship

- Season: 1968
- Teams: 27
- Finals site: Johnny Rosenblatt Stadium; Omaha, NE
- Champions: Southern California (5th title)
- Runner-up: Southern Illinois (1st CWS Appearance)
- Winning coach: Rod Dedeaux (5th title)
- MOP: Bill Seinsoth (Southern California)

The 1968 NCAA University Division baseball tournament was played at the end of the 1968 NCAA University Division baseball season to determine the national champion of college baseball. The tournament concluded with eight teams competing in the College World Series, a double-elimination tournament in its twenty-second year. Eight regional districts sent representatives to the College World Series with preliminary rounds within each district serving to determine each representative. These events would later become known as regionals. Each district had its own format for selecting teams, resulting in 27 teams participating in the tournament at the conclusion of their regular season, and in some cases, after a conference tournament. The twenty-second tournament's champion was the Southern California, coached by Rod Dedeaux. The Most Outstanding Player was Bill Seinsoth of the Southern California.

== Tournament ==
The opening rounds of the tournament were played across eight district sites across the country, each consisting of between two and four teams. The winners of each District advanced to the College World Series.

Bold indicates winner.

=== District 1 at Storrs, CT ===
Upper round 1
**Connecticut**	**1**
Providence	0
**Harvard**	**4**
Boston University	1
Lower round 1
Providence	4*
**Boston University**	**5***

Upper final
Connecticut	0
**Harvard**	**3**
Lower final
**Connecticut**	**8**
Boston University	2

Final
**Harvard**	**3**	—
Connecticut	2	—

=== District 2 at Princeton, NJ ===
Upper round 1
**St. John's**	**12**
Rutgers	0
**Temple**	**6**
NYU	5
Lower round 1
**NYU**	**5**
Rutgers	0

Upper final
**St. John's**	**2**
Temple	0
Lower final
**NYU**	**5**
Temple	2

Final
**St. John's**	**1**	—
NYU	0	—

=== District 3 at Gastonia, NC ===
Upper round 1
**NC State**	**3**
Alabama	1
**East Carolina**	**2***
Florida State	1*
Lower round 1
**Florida State**	**6**
Alabama	1

Upper final
**NC State**	**7**
East Carolina	5
Lower final
East Carolina	2
**Florida State**	**3**

Final
**NC State**	12	**4**
Florida State	**15**	1

=== District 4 at Minneapolis, MN ===
Upper round 1
**Minnesota**	**6**
Valparaiso	4
**Southern Illinois**	**6**
Ohio	3
Lower round 1
Valparaiso	0
**Ohio**	**1**

Upper final
Minnesota	9
**Southern Illinois**	**10**
Lower final
Minnesota	4
**Ohio**	**5**

Final
**Southern Illinois**	**3**	—
Ohio	0	—

=== District 5 at Stillwater, OK ===
Finals
**Oklahoma State**	**13**	**3**	—
Bradley	1	0	—

=== District 6 at Austin, TX ===
Finals
**Texas**	**3**	1*	**10**
Texas–Pan American	0	**2***	6

=== District 7 at Ogden, UT ===
First Round
2	**Northern Colorado**	**4**
5	Weber State	3
3	**Weber State**	**7**
4	Denver	5

Upper Round
Northern Colorado	15
**Weber State**	**21**
Lower Round
**Denver**	**15**
Northern Colorado	6

Semifinal
**Weber State**	**4**	—
Denver	1	—

Final
1	**BYU**	**17**	**7***	—
Weber State	7	6*	—

=== District 8 at Los Angeles, CA ===
Semifinal				Final
				**Southern California**	**4**	4*	**5***
**Cal State Los Angeles**	**2**	**5**	—	Cal State Los Angeles	2	**8***	4*
Santa Clara	1	3	—

== College World Series ==
=== Participants ===
School	Conference	Record (conference)	Head coach	CWS appearances	CWS best finish	CWS record
BYU	WAC	31–15 (8–4)	Glen Tuckett	0 (last: none)	none	0–0
Harvard	EIBL	19–7 (8–1)	Norman Shepard	0 (last: none)	none	0–0
NC State	ACC	23–7 (13–4)	Sam Esposito	0 (last: none)	none	0–0
Oklahoma State	Big 8	20–7 (15–3)	Chet Bryan	7 (last: 1967)	1st (1959)	18–13
Southern Illinois	n/a	34–12 (n/a)	Joe Lutz	0 (last: none)	none	0–0
St. John's	n/a	23–8 (n/a)	Jack Kaiser	3 (last: 1966)	4th (1949, 1966)	3–6
Texas	SWC	22–9 (12–4)	Cliff Gustafson	10 (last: 1966)	1st (1949, 1950)	20–17
USC	Pac-8	38–12–1 (16–2)	Rod Dedeaux	10 (last: 1966)	1st (1948, 1958, 1961, 1963)	29–15

=== Results ===
==== Bracket ====
Upper round 1
Harvard	0
St. John's	2
Southern Illinois	6
NC State	7
Texas	5
Oklahoma State	8
BYU	3
USC	5

Upper round 2
St. John's	3^{12}
NC State	2
Oklahoma State	5
USC	6
Lower round 1
Harvard	1
Southern Illinois	2^{11}
Texas	7
BYU	0

Upper final
St. John's	6
USC	7
Lower round 2
Southern Illinois	7
Oklahoma State	1
Texas	5
NC State	6

Semifinals
USC	2
NC State	0
Southern Illinois	15
St. John's	0

Final
USC	4
Southern Illinois	3

==== Game results ====
Date	Game	Winner	Score	Loser	Notes
June 10	Game 1	St. John's	2–0	Harvard	
June 10	Game 2	NC State	7–6	Southern Illinois	
June 11	Game 3	Oklahoma State	8–5	Texas	
June 11	Game 4	USC	5–3	BYU	
June 11	Game 5	Southern Illinois	2–1 (11 innings)	Harvard	Harvard eliminated
June 12	Game 6	Texas	7–0	BYU	BYU eliminated
June 12	Game 7	St. John's	3–2 (12 innings)	NC State	
June 12	Game 8	USC	6–5	Oklahoma State	
June 13	Game 9	NC State	6–5	Texas	Texas eliminated
June 13	Game 10	Southern Illinois	7–1	Oklahoma State	Oklahoma State eliminated
June 13	Game 11	USC	7–6	St. John's	
June 14	Game 12	Southern Illinois	15–0	St. John's	St. John's eliminated
June 14	Game 13	USC	2–0	NC State	NC State eliminated
June 15	Final	USC	4–3	Southern Illinois	USC wins CWS

=== All-Tournament Team ===
The following players were members of the All-Tournament Team.

Position	Player	School
P	Bill Lee	USC
P	Tom Sowinski	St. John's
C	Ralph Addonizio	St. John's
1B	Bill Seinsoth (MOP)	USC
2B	Lou Bagwell	Texas
3B	Barry O'Sullivan	Southern Illinois
SS	Danny Thompson	Oklahoma State
OF	Jerry Bond	Southern Illinois
OF	Mike Rogodzinski	Southern Illinois
OF	Wayne Weatherly	Oklahoma State

=== Notable players ===
- BYU: Ken Crosby, Doug Howard
- Harvard: Ray Peters, Pete Varney
- NC State: Mike Caldwell, Tommy Smith
- Oklahoma State: Danny Thompson
- USC: Jim Barr, Bill Lee, Brent Strom
- Southern Illinois: Skip Pitlock, Mike Rogodzinski
- St. John's:
- Texas: Larry Hardy

== See also ==
- 1968 NCAA College Division baseball tournament (inaugural edition)
- 1968 NAIA World Series
