= Split-finger fastball =

Baseball pitch

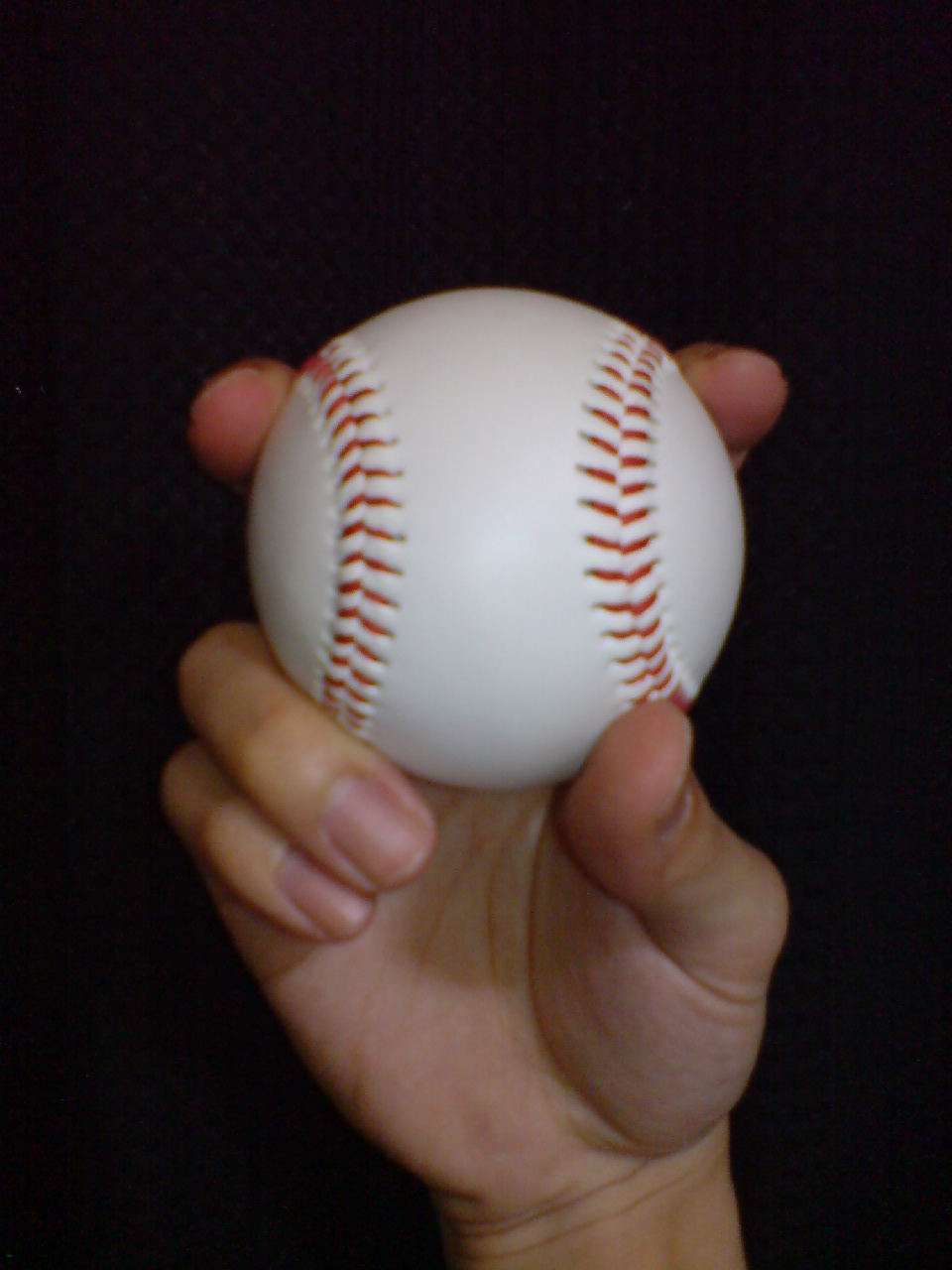

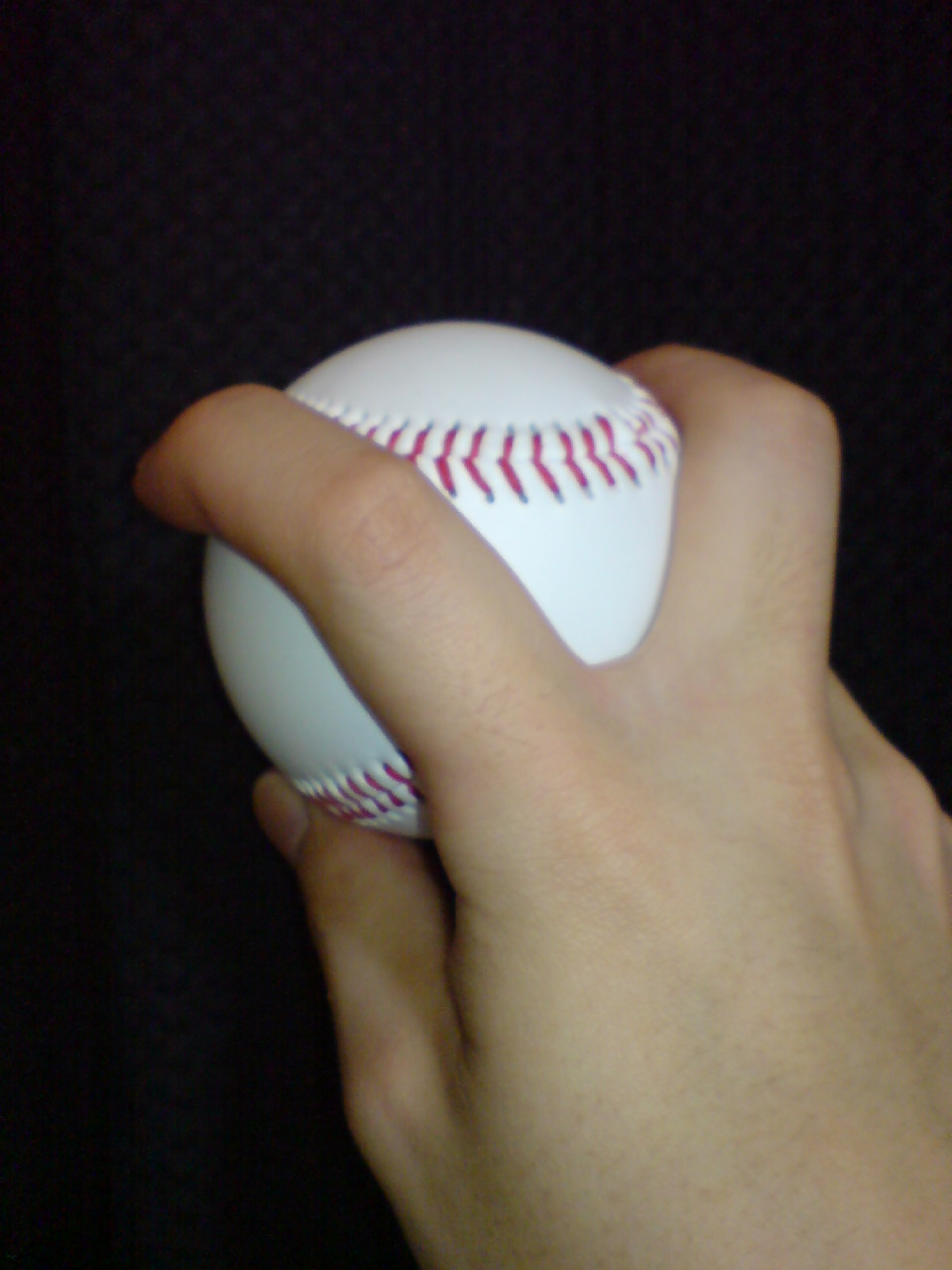

A split-finger fastball or splitter is an off-speed pitch in baseball that initially looks like a fastball from the batters perspective, but then drops suddenly. Derived from the forkball, it is aptly named because the pitcher puts the index and middle finger on different sides of the ball.

== History ==
The splitter grew out of a much older pitch, the forkball, which was first used in the major leagues in the 1920s. The modern splitter is often credited to baseball coach Fred Martin, who threw the pitch in the minor leagues as a changeup of sorts. When a young Bruce Sutter returned from surgery to find his fastball had lost velocity, Martin taught Sutter the pitch. Sutter's success as a closer helped popularize the pitch.

Another early proponent of the splitter was Roger Craig, a pitcher-turned-manager, in the 1980s. He taught it to a number of pitchers on the teams he coached, the Detroit Tigers and San Francisco Giants. Longtime player and manager Mike Scioscia called the splitter "the pitch of the '80s."

The splitter eventually lost popularity in MLB after concerns arose that extensive use of the pitch could rob pitchers of fastball speed and increase injury risk. Several major league teams discourage pitching prospects from throwing or learning the pitch. In 2011, only 15 starting pitchers used it as part of their regular repertoire. Splitter usage has begun to see a resurgence in the 2020s, with little research indicating support for the increased injury risk, and the MLB success of Japanese splitter-throwers from NPB, where the splitter has long been a primary pitch, as key factors.

== Purpose and technique ==
The main purpose of the split-fingered pitch is for the pitcher to make the batter believe it will be a fastball in the strike zone. Then, at the last second, the pitch dips down, which causes the batter to either swing over the pitch or ground it weakly into the infield.

The split-finger grip is similar to the forkball grip. However, the forkball is held further back and wider between the fingers and is usually thrown with a wrist flip that makes it slower than the splitter. The split-finger is often recommended as an alternative to breaking pitches to young players because of its simplicity and the significantly reduced risk of injury.

An off-speed pitch, the splitter is generally thrown slower than the pitcher's fastball. According to PITCHf/x, the average four-seam fastball from a right-handed pitcher in 2010 was 92 mph, whereas the average splitter was 85 mph and the average changeup 83 mph.

The motion of a split-finger pitch is similar to the outlawed spitball and at one time the pitch was known as the "dry spitter". When thrown, the pitcher must emphasize the downward pull of the pitch at the end of his motion. Thrusting the hand and forearm downward causes reduced backspin relative to a fastball, thus giving the appearance of "drop off the table" movement from the pitch. When thrown correctly, the split-finger's apparent last-second drop causes many batters to hit the top half of the baseball, thereby inducing a ground ball. The split-finger fastball is a very effective pitch with runners on base; a common tactic is using the split-finger to cause the batter to hit into a double play. The disadvantage of using a splitter with runners on base is that the extreme downward trajectory of the pitch could land the ball into the dirt, and cause a wild pitch to advance the runners; a pitcher must trust their catcher when throwing it.

== Notable splitter pitchers ==
=== 1970s and 1980s ===
- Bruce Sutter, a Hall of Fame inductee, was a dominant closer in the 1970s and '80s and made heavy use of the split-finger pitch. He won the 1979 Cy Young and became the only National League pitcher to lead the league in saves 5 times.
- Jack Morris learned the pitch from Roger Craig in 1980, and it became an effective "out" pitch for the hurler for his 18-year Hall of Fame career.
- Mike Scott also learned the pitch from Craig after the 1984 season, and it turned his career around; he became one of the most dominant pitchers in the 1980s. He won the 1986 NL Cy Young Award and posted a league-leading 306 strikeouts that year.
- Dave Stewart was known for his blazing fastball, but had a mostly inconsistent major league career until he learned the splitter after signing with the Oakland Athletics in 1986. He would go on to have 4 consecutive 20 win seasons from 1987 to 1990.

=== 1990s ===
- Roger Clemens in the 1980s primarily threw a fastball in the high 90s along with a hard breaking slider. By the 1990s, he began heavily featuring a splitter he called "Mr. Splitty". It would become his main strikeout pitch. Clemens is often cited as having perhaps the most devastating splitter in baseball history due to its movement and velocity.
- David Cone had a variety of elite breaking pitches, including a cutter, curveball, and slider. But in the 1990s, his splitter became his most dangerous and main strikeout pitch when ahead in the count.
- Kevin Appier with a motion being described as "herky-jerky", used a devastating slider and splitter combo to become one of the top starters in the 1990s.
- Hideo Nomo mastered the splitter in Japan, and it was known for the amount of movement it could generate. He could also change speeds on his splitter and would use it as his main off-speed pitch. He won the Rookie of the Year Award while also leading the NL in strikeouts in 1995. The effect, Nomomania, is named after him by the USA media for his noteworthy impact in the baseball.
- Curt Schilling learned the pitch in his late 20s while on the Philadelphia Phillies. For the first 8 years of his career, he was not known as a strikeout pitcher. But after featuring the pitch starting in the 1996 season, he became one of the top strikeout pitchers of all time, totaling 3,116 for his career.

=== 2000s ===
- Randy Johnson developed a splitter later in his career after losing some of his fastball velocity. He used the pitch as a slower offspeed pitch to contrast with his sweeping and harder slider. It became a key pitch for him, especially during his four Cy Young Award-winning years with the Arizona Diamondbacks, including his 2001 World Series co-MVP performance.
- Dan Haren was a three-time all-star and used the splitter as his main strikeout pitch. The majority of his splitters were thrown with two strikes.
- John Smoltz was known for having one of the best sliders in baseball history, but he relied increasingly on a splitter later in his career. He featured the splitter heavily in his four-year run as the Atlanta Braves' closer from 2001 to 2004. He kept using the pitch in his return as a dominant starter from 2005 until the end of his career in 2009.
- Kazuhiro Sasaki possessed a dominant splitter that was nicknamed "The Thang" by the Seattle Mariners radio announcers. He was one of the top closers in MLB for his four years with the Mariners.

=== 2010s ===
- Masahiro Tanaka brought his devastating splitter from Japan and it dominated MLB hitters from 2014 to 2020 with the NY Yankees. He represented the trend in the 2010s when the pitch was mostly used by pitchers who came over from Japan, since the pitch had fallen out of favor in MLB since the late 1990s and early 2000s due to injury concerns.
- Hisashi Iwakuma was a soft-tossing righty for the Seattle Mariners who finished 3rd in the AL Cy Young voting in 2013, and whose splitter was considered his main pitch.
- Koji Uehara pitched 21 years between Nippon Professional Baseball and MLB and mainly featured a splitter.
- Shohei Ohtani is known for his splitter that is said to "fall off a table". His splitter was considered one of the most unhittable pitches in baseball after his first season pitching for the Los Angeles Angels in 2018.

=== 2020s ===
- Kevin Gausman has used a splitter from the start of his MLB career in 2013, but began using it as up to 40% of his pitches in 2020. His use of the splitter greatly increased his strikeout totals, leading to him making two all-star teams and becoming one of the better pitchers of the 2020s.
- Casey Mize uses a hard splitter with excellent control as his strikeout pitch. Mize was the first player taken in the 2018 MLB draft. His dominant use of the pitch in college at Auburn and his selection as the first pick in the draft indicated the splitter was starting to become more in vogue again, and some of the fears of the 1990s and 2000s about it had subsided.
- Yoshinobu Yamamoto utilized his splitter to become one of the premier pitchers in Japan before signing with the Los Angeles Dodgers in 2024. His splitter, often clocking 92–93 mph, has been a key component of his pitching arsenal. In a 2023 interview, Roger Clemens remarked that Yamamoto's splitter reminded him of his own, noting similarities in movement and velocity.
- Roki Sasaki primarily features a fastball and splitter, with the latter drawing significant attention as a potential game-changing pitch in Major League Baseball. His splitter has been described as "unlike any MLB pitch we've seen before," exhibiting extremely low spin rates and dramatic late movement that confounds hitters. In his spring training outings for the Dodgers, Sasaki's splitter achieved an 83% whiff rate, with 10 swings and misses out of 12 swings, and six of nine plate appearances ending in strikeouts via the splitter.
- Fernando Cruz's splitter has been described as "unhittable", and he credits his MLB career to learning the pitch.
