= Mr. California =

Mr. California may refer to:

- Rockwell D. Hunt, named "Mr. California" by Governor Goodwin Knight in 1954
- Frank D. Lanterman (1901–1981), American politician, nicknamed "Mr. California" for public contributions to the state
