= Bill Lee (left-handed pitcher) =

American baseball player (born 1946)

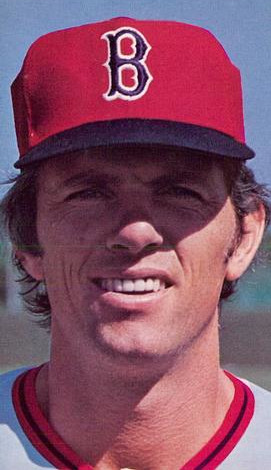
- Lee in 1976
- Pitcher
- Born: December 28, 1946 (age 79); Burbank, California, U.S.
- Batted: Left Threw: Left

MLB debut
- June 25, 1969, for the Boston Red Sox

Last MLB appearance
- May 7, 1982, for the Montreal Expos

MLB statistics
- Win–loss record: 119–90
- Earned run average: 3.62
- Strikeouts: 713
- Stats at Baseball Reference

Teams
- Boston Red Sox (1969–1978); Montreal Expos (1979–1982)

Career highlights and awards
- All-Star (1973); Boston Red Sox Hall of Fame

William Francis Lee III (born December 28, 1946), nicknamed "Spaceman", is an American former professional baseball left-handed pitcher who played in Major League Baseball (MLB) for the Boston Red Sox (1969–1978) and Montreal Expos (1979–1982). On November 7, 2008, Lee was inducted into the Red Sox Hall of Fame as the team's record-holder for most games pitched by a left-hander (321) and the third highest win total by a Red Sox southpaw (94). On August 23, 2012, he signed a contract to play with the San Rafael Pacifics of the independent North American League, at age 65.

In addition to his statistical baseball accomplishments, Lee is known for his counterculture behavior, his antics both on and off the field, and his use of the "Leephus pitch", a personalized variation of the eephus pitch.

Lee has co-written four books: The Wrong Stuff; Have Glove, Will Travel; The Little Red (Sox) Book: A Revisionist Red Sox History; and Baseball Eccentrics: The Most Entertaining, Outrageous, and Unforgettable Characters in the Game. In 2006, the Brett Rapkin documentary film Spaceman: A Baseball Odyssey featured Lee.

== Biography ==
Lee was born in Burbank, California, into a family of former semipro and professional baseball players. His grandfather William Lee was an infielder for the Hollywood Stars of the Pacific Coast League, and his aunt Annabelle Lee was a pitcher in the All-American Girls Professional Baseball League. "She was the best athlete in the family", Lee said. "She taught me how to pitch." Lee's great-grandfather Rockwell D. Hunt was a prominent college professor and historian.

Lee attended and played baseball at Terra Linda High School in San Rafael, California, graduating in 1964 before enrolling at the University of Southern California (USC). From 1964 to 1968, majoring in physical education and geography, Lee attended USC, where he played for Rod Dedeaux. Lee was part of the Trojans team that won the 1968 College World Series and was drafted by the Boston Red Sox in the 22nd round of the 1968 Major League Baseball draft.

Lee served in the US Army Reserve for six years during the Vietnam War. One of his jobs was to process the dead soldiers from New England and call the families. He was also a chemical, radiation, and biological officer for the 1173rd and earned Soldier of the Cycle at Fort Polk, Louisiana.

Lee is a Rastafarian and a former Catholic. He is married to Canadian-born Diana Donovan.

== Major league career ==
Lacking a good fastball, Lee developed off-speed pitches, including a variation of the Eephus pitch. The Leephus pitch or Space Ball, the names for Lee's take on the eephus pitch, follows a high, arcing trajectory and is very slow.

Lee is the last Red Sox player to miss time during the season for his military obligation after being on active duty in the Army Reserve from June 1 to October 1, 1970.

Lee was used almost exclusively as a relief pitcher during the first four years of his career. During that period, Lee appeared in 125 games, starting in nine, and compiled a 19–11 record. In 1973, he was used primarily as a starting pitcher. He started 33 of the 38 games in which he appeared and went 17–11 with a 2.95 Earned Run Average, and was named to the American League All-Star team. He followed 1973 with two more 17-win seasons.

He started two games in the 1975 World Series against the Cincinnati Reds. He left both the 2nd and 7th games with the lead, although the Red Sox lost both games and the Series. He gave up a two-run home run to Tony Perez on an eephus pitch with a three-run lead in the sixth inning of Game 7.

On May 20 of the 1976 season, Lee started a game against the New York Yankees, pitching six innings, and the Red Sox won 8–2. However, the game is remembered for the final out of the sixth, when Lou Piniella of the Yankees was tagged out at home by Red Sox catcher Carlton Fisk. On the play, Piniella ran into Fisk who was blocking home plate. The collision between Piniella and Fisk instigated a fight between the two players resulting in a bench-clearing brawl, during which Lee suffered a torn ligament in his pitching shoulder. Lee missed almost two months of the season and finished with a 5–7 record.

=== Later Red Sox career ===
During the 1978 season, Lee and Red Sox manager Don Zimmer engaged in an ongoing public feud over the handling of the pitching staff. Lee's independence and iconoclastic nature clashed with Zimmer's old-school, conservative personality. Lee and a few other Red Sox formed what they called "The Buffalo Heads" as a response to the manager. Zimmer then relegated Lee to the bullpen, and management traded Hall of Famer Ferguson Jenkins and Bernie Carbo. Lee threatened to retire after his friend Carbo was traded; he subsequently referred to Zimmer as "the gerbil", which proved to be the last straw. Lee briefly left the Red Sox after pitching in a 10–9 win at home over California on June 12 but returned a few days later; however, during the home stretch, when the Red Sox were battling the Yankees for the pennant, Zimmer refused to pitch Lee. The Red Sox lost the pennant in a one-game playoff with the Yankees.

=== Montreal Expos ===
Lee was traded at the end of 1978 to the Montreal Expos for Stan Papi, a utility infielder. Lee bade farewell to Boston by saying, "Who wants to be with a team that will go down in history alongside the '64 Phillies and the '67 Arabs?" Lee won 16 games for the Expos in 1979 while being named The Sporting News National League Left Hander of the Year (over Philadelphia's Steve Carlton). His professional career ended in 1982, when he was released by the Expos after staging a one-game walkout as a protest over Montreal's decision to release second baseman and friend Rodney Scott.

== Reputation and controversy ==
Lee's personality earned him popularity as well as the nickname "Spaceman", given to him by former Red Sox infielder John Kennedy. His outspoken manner and unfiltered comments were frequently recorded in the press. Lee spoke in defense of Maoist China, population control, Greenpeace, and school busing in Boston, among other things. Concerning the last of those issues, he defended W. Arthur Garrity Jr. by stating that he was "the only guy in this town with any guts." He berated an umpire for a controversial call in the 1975 World Series, threatening to bite off his ear and encouraging the American people to write letters demanding the game be replayed. When asked about his views on mandatory drug testing, Lee quipped: "I've tried just about all of them, but I wouldn't want to make it mandatory". In his 1984 book The Wrong Stuff, he claimed his marijuana use made him impervious to bus fumes while jogging to work at Fenway Park. Much of the material in this book is, however, tongue-in-cheek.

His propensity to criticize management led to his being dropped from both the Red Sox and the Expos, and the end of his professional career by 1982.

== Post-professional life ==
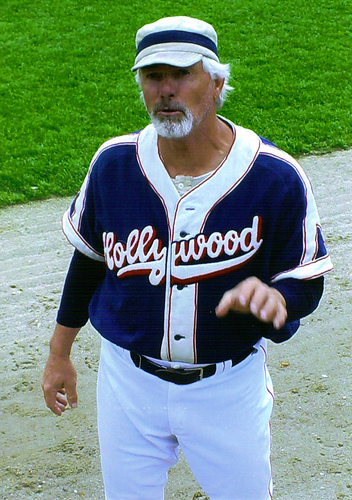
Bill in Nashua, New Hampshire playing for the Oil Can Boyd All Star Team

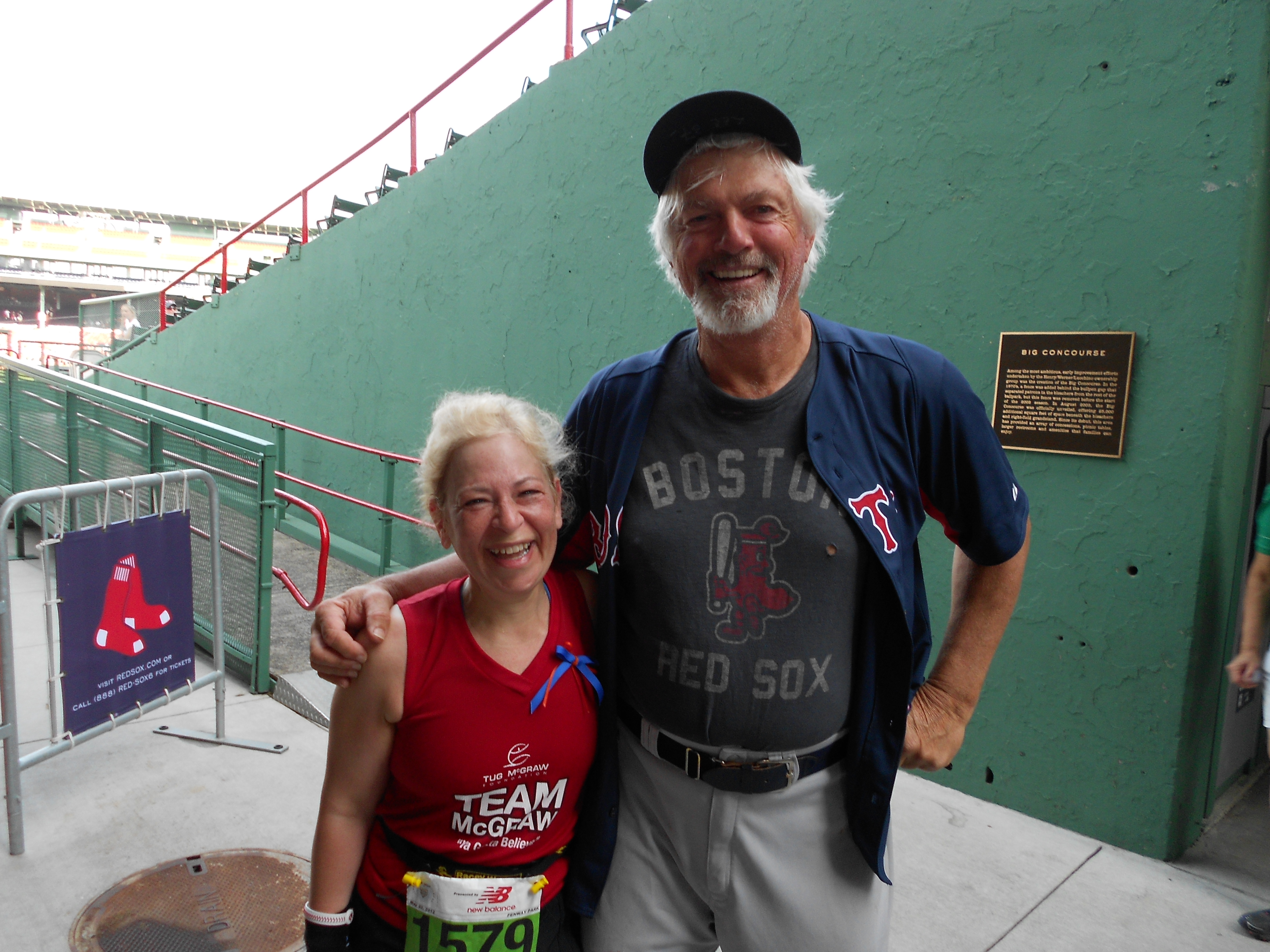
Lee at Fenway Park with a 2012 Boston Marathon runner

After the Expos released Lee in May 1982, he played for semi-professional teams, including the single-season Senior Professional Baseball Association in Florida, largely composed of retired major leaguers. He played in Venezuela, and starting in 1984 he lived in Moncton, New Brunswick, where he played first base and pitcher for the Moncton Mets, earning $500 per week. That year, he published his first autobiographical book, The Wrong Stuff.

In 1988, he and his second wife, Pamela, announced plans to move to Burlington, Vermont. In 1987, he had announced plans to run for President of the United States for the Rhinoceros Party, which necessitated the move. Since then he has played mostly as a celebrity pitcher in games around the world.

Since 1999, Lee has been an ambassador for Major League Baseball to Cuba helping to bring Cuban players to the US and setting up goodwill tours especially to Canada.

In 2007, Lee joined former major league players Dennis "Oil Can" Boyd, Marquis Grissom, Delino DeShields, and Ken Ryan on Oil Can Boyd's Traveling All-Stars. In June 2008, Lee pitched for the Alaska Goldpanners during the annual Midnight Sun ball game played at night during the Summer Solstice.

In September 2010, Lee pitched 5 1/3 innings for the Brockton Rox (a team that was then a member of the Canadian-American Association of Professional Baseball), picking up the win. At the age of 63, that win made him the oldest pitcher to appear in or to win a professional baseball game.

On October 8, 2011, Lee participated in the "100 Innings of Baseball Game" hosted by the Boston Amateur Baseball Network to raise money for ALS (Lou Gehrig's Disease). On August 23, 2012, Lee pitched a nine-inning complete game for the San Rafael Pacifics in San Rafael, California, beating the Na Koa Ikaika Maui 9–4. Using a homemade bat in the fifth inning, he drove in the first run of the game for the Pacifics. Lee was signed to a one-day contract by Pacifics' President and General Manager Mike Shapiro. Lee's bat and uniform were donated to the Baseball Hall of Fame following the game as the start gave him the record for the oldest pitcher to make a starting appearance, pitch a complete game and also to earn a win in a professional baseball game. In 2013, Lee played all nine positions in one game for the Pacifics.

Lee lives in northern Vermont with his third wife. He is also a regular on Melnick in the Afternoon with Mitch Melnick at TSN 690 sports radio in Montreal in a segment called "Answers from Space". In 2007, Lee was featured in High Times, a counterculture, pro-marijuana magazine. He also makes frequent appearances on Sports Overnight America, a nationally syndicated radio program hosted by Gerrie Burke (a long-time friend) out of San Francisco.

He is also a regular coach/pro at the annual Red Sox Baseball Fantasy Camp run by the Red Sox Organization in Florida at the team's Spring Training Facility.

Lee was inducted into the Baseball Reliquary's Shrine of the Eternals in 2000.

In 2009, Lee released his own wine label, "Spaceman Red" wine, a California syrah, cabernet and petite sirah blend, produced with winemaker and longtime friend Geoff Whitman, and distributed in Massachusetts, Rhode Island, Vermont, Maine, and New Hampshire. A large portion of the wine project’s proceeds go to support Inner City Youth Baseball and the Red Sox Scholars programs in New England. In 2022, Spaceman Red will be produced by Whitman in Napa, California. In 2004, he released a beer in partnership with Vermont's Magic Hat Brewing Company. Called Spaceman Ale, it is no longer in production.

On September 2, 2018, Lee played designated hitter for the Ottawa Champions.

Lee has been affiliated with the Savannah Bananas, an independent baseball team that also puts on comedic performances. He has occasionally appeared in games for the team as a relief pitcher. On August 19, 2022 Lee collapsed while warming up in the bullpen for a game and was taken to a local hospital for evaluation.

=== Spaceman: A Baseball Odyssey ===
In 2003, filmmakers Brett Rapkin and Josh Dixon joined Lee on a barnstorming trip to Cuba, gathering footage for the documentary film Spaceman: A Baseball Odyssey. The film premiered at the 2006 SILVERDOCS AFI/Discovery Channel Documentary Festival and later on the New England Sports Network and MLB Network. It is distributed across North America by Hart Sharp Video.

=== Spaceman (film) ===
Spaceman is a biographical film about Lee written and directed by Brett Rapkin and starring Josh Duhamel as Lee.

=== Eephus (film) ===
Eephus is a 2024 sports film that stars Lee as the character "Lee" and prominently features his eephus pitch.

== Political career ==
In 1988, Lee was the Rhinoceros Party presidential candidate running on a platform of bulldozing the Rocky Mountains so Alberta could receive a few extra minutes of sunlight and banning guns and butter. His slogan was "No guns, no butter. Both can kill."

=== 2016 gubernatorial campaign ===
A longtime resident of Craftsbury, Vermont, in May 2016, Lee was chosen by the Liberty Union Party as its nominee for governor in the 2016 election. Lee, who had never heard of the Liberty Union Party before, was contacted by the party to run for governor and accepted. Lee did not take campaign contributions. His campaign slogan was, "So far left, we're right". Lee is a supporter of Bernie Sanders but sees himself as "Bernie-heavy not Bernie-lite" arguing he is Sanders' policy twin. During the campaign he advocated for a Canadian style health care system, revealing that he got his shoulder surgery in Canada for $5000, estimating it would have cost $50,000 to $70,000 in the US.

Lee lost the election, receiving 8,912 votes (2.78%), the second highest number of votes for a Liberty Union gubernatorial candidate in the party's history, second only to Bernie Sanders himself in 1976 who got 11,317 votes (6.1%).

== Books ==
He is the author of four books, two written with Richard Lally, and two with Jim Prime:

- Lee, Bill, and Dick Lally (1984). The Wrong Stuff. New York: Viking Press. ISBN 0-670-76724-7.
- Lee, Bill, and Jim Prime (2003). The Little Red (Sox) Book: A Revisionist Red Sox History. Chicago: Triumph Books. ISBN 1-57243-527-5.
- Lee, Bill, and Richard Lally (2005). Have Glove, Will Travel: Adventures of a Baseball Vagabond. New York: Crown Publishers. ISBN 1-4000-5407-9.
- Lee, Bill, and Jim Prime (2007). Baseball Eccentrics: The Most Entertaining, Outrageous, and Unforgettable Characters in the Game. Chicago: Triumph Books. ISBN 1-57243-953-X.

== In popular culture ==
Lee appears as a minor character in the 2021 Serge A. Storms novel Tropic of Stupid by Tim Dorsey.

=== Songs dedicated to Lee ===
- Lee is the subject of the 1980 song "Bill Lee" on Warren Zevon's album Bad Luck Streak in Dancing School.
- Lee is the subject of the song "What Bothers the Spaceman" by They Might Be Giants spinoff project Mono Puff, on their 1996 debut album Unsupervised.
- Lee is the subject of the 2003 song "The Ballad of Bill Lee" by the Karl Hendricks Trio. Their album The Jerks Win Again takes its title from a lyric in this song.
