= William Jewell Cardinals women's soccer =

American college soccer team

William Jewell Cardinals
- University: William Jewell College
- Head coach: Thomas Bledsoe (1st season)
- Conference: GLVC
- Location: Liberty, Missouri, US
- Stadium: Dr. Luther D. Greene Stadium (capacity: 3,000)
- Nickname: Cardinals
- Colors: cardinal, black, and white
| Home | Away |

NCAA tournament appearances
- 2003, 2004, 2005, 2007, and 2010 (NAIA), 2012

The William Jewell Cardinals women's soccer team represents William Jewell College and competes in the Great Lakes Valley Conference (GLVC) of NCAA Division II. Playing their home games at Greene Stadium on the campus of William Jewell College in Liberty, Missouri.

== History ==
Prior to the 2011 season the Cardinals competed in the National Association of Intercollegiate Athletics (NAIA) as a member of the Heart of America Athletic Conference (HAAC). In 2007 The university began the four year transition process to NCAA Division II. The Cardinals women's soccer team received bids to the NAIA National Soccer Championship Tournament in 2003, 2004, 2005, 2007, and 2010. In addition the Cardinals advanced to the NAIA National Final Four in 2003 and NAIA National Elite Eight in 2010. In 2011 the Cardinals will begin competing as a member of Division II in the Great Lakes Valley Conference (GLVC).

== Coaching staff ==
The Cardinals are coached by Jefferson Roblee. The Cardinals's staff also includes assistant coach Josh Howard and goalkeeper coach Brad Anderson.

== All Americans ==
William Jewell has had eight NAIA All-American soccer players:

- Sarah Franklin (2010 3rd team, forward)
- Nicole Revenaugh, (2007 1st team, forward)
- Shanon Eberle (2007 2nd team, midfielder)
- Theresa Noll (2007 3rd team, defender)
- Allison Mallams, (2003 1st team, forward)
- Sydney Boggess (2003 2nd team, defender)
- Kristin Neher (2003 2nd team, forward)
- Kristin Neher (2001 2nd team, forward)

=== Academic All-American ===
William Jewell has had two NSCAA Academic All-American soccer players:

- Danielle Doerfler (2010, 3rd Team midfielder)
- Nicole Revenaugh (2007, 1st Team forward)

=== CoSIDA/ESPN THE MAGAZINE Academic All District ===
Midfielder, Danielle Doerfler became the program's first CoSIDA/ESPN The Magazine Academic All District award winniner in 2009 when she earned a spot on the 3rd Team.

== See also ==
- William Jewell College men's soccer
