= 1968 NAIA World Series =

1968 NAIA baseball tournament
- 1968 NAIA World Series
- Teams: 8
- Format: Double elimination
- Finals site: Phil Welch Stadium; St. Joseph, Missouri
- Champions: William Jewell (1st title)
- Winning coach: Fred Flook
- MVP: Rich Stonum (P) (William Jewell)

The 1968 NAIA World Series was the 12th annual tournament hosted by the National Association of Intercollegiate Athletics to determine the national champion of baseball among its member colleges and universities in the United States and Canada.

The tournament was played at Phil Welch Stadium in St. Joseph, Missouri.

William Jewell (30-15) defeated Georgia Southern (32-21) in the championship series, 4–3, to win the Cardinals' first NAIA World Series.

William Jewell pitcher Rich Stonum was named tournament MVP.

== Bracket ==
First round	Second round	Semifinals	National Championship
Central Washington State	7
Sul Ross State	3
Central Washington State	6
Pfeiffer	2
Glassboro State	3
Pfeiffer	6
Central Washington State	4
William Jewell	6
Eastern Michigan	14
Georgia Southern	7
Eastern Michigan	3
William Jewell	4
Buena Vista	3
William Jewell	4	William Jewell	4	4
Georgia Southern	6	3
Consolation first round	Consolation second round	Consolation third round	Consolation fourth round
Eastern Michigan	7
Sul Ross State	1	Glassboro State	2	Central Washington State	1
Glassboro State	4	Eastern Michigan	0	Georgia Southern	5
Georgia Southern	4
Pfeiffer	5
Georgia Southern	7	Georgia Southern	10
Buena Vista	2

== See also ==
- 1968 NCAA University Division baseball tournament
- 1968 NCAA College Division baseball tournament
