= William Jewell Cardinals men's soccer =

American college soccer team

William Jewell Cardinals
- University: William Jewell College
- Head coach: Keith Buderus (1st season)
- Conference: GLVC
- Location: Liberty, Missouri, US
- Stadium: Dr. Luther D. Greene Stadium (capacity: 3,000)
- Nickname: Cardinals
- Colors: cardinal, black, and white
| Home | Away |

NCAA tournament appearances
- 2004, 2006, and 2010 (NAIA)

Conference tournament championships
- 2006 and 2010 (HAAC)

Conference regular season championships
- 2006 and 2010 (HAAC)

The William Jewell Cardinals men's soccer team represents William Jewell College and competes in the Great Lakes Valley Conference (GLVC) of NCAA Division II. Playing their home games at Greene Stadium on the campus of William Jewell College in Liberty, Missouri, the WJC men's soccer team's home games are well attended by WJC students and the Kansas City soccer community.

== History ==
Prior to the 2011 season the Cardinals competed in the National Association of Intercollegiate Athletics (NAIA) as a member of the Heart of America Athletic Conference (HAAC). In 2007 The university began the four year transition process to NCAA Division II. The Cardinals men's soccer team won HAAC championship and 2006 and 2010 and received bids to the NAIA National Soccer Championship Tournament in 2004, 2006, and 2010. In addition the Cardinals were Region V Champions in 2006 and appeared in the NAIA National Final Four twice in 2006 and 2010. In 2011 the Cardinals will begin competing as a member of Division II in the Great Lakes Valley Conference (GLVC).

== Coaching staff ==
The Cardinals are coached by Keith Buderus. The Cardinals' coaching staff also includes assistant coaches Jose Zertuche and Juan Reyes.

== National Academic Team Honors ==
- 2009: William Jewell College men's soccer team is honored with the National Soccer Coaches Association (NSCAA) Team Academic Award.
- 2008: William Jewell College men's soccer team is honored with the National Soccer Coaches Association (NSCAA) Team Academic Award.
- 2007: William Jewell College men's soccer team is honored with the National Soccer Coaches Association (NSCAA) Team Academic Award.

== All Americans ==
William Jewell has had three NAIA All-American soccer players.

- Justin Beck (2010, NSCAA NAIA 2nd Team All America)
- Allan Nekuda (2006, NSCAA/adidas NAIA 1st Team All America)
- Josh Howard (2006, NSCAA/adidas NAIA 2nd Team All America)

=== Academic All-American ===
William Jewell has had 11 NAIA Academic All-American soccer players.

- Joshua Ehrhard, (2009, senior defender)
- Kyle Heiman (2009, junior goalkeeper)
- A.J. Shinabargar (2009, junior defender)
- Joshua Ehrhard (2008, junior midfielder)
- Garrett Jahn (2007 senior midfielder)
- Jacob Patton (2007, senior defender)
- Dusty Green (2006, senior midfielder)
- Garrett Jahn (2006, junior midfielder)
- Jacob Patton (2006, junior defender)
- Jake Wyllie (2005, senior midfielder)
- Jake Wyllie (2004, junior midfielder)

== Players in the Pros ==
- Josh Howard: signed contract with Söderhamns FF of the Swedish second division in 2009.
- Kevin Nekuda: Drafted in the second round of the 2008 Major Indoor Soccer League College Draft by the Orlando Sharks.
- Allan Nekuda: Drafted in the second round of the 2007 Major Indoor Soccer League College Draft by the Detroit Ignition.
- Blake Ryan: Drafted in the ninth round of the 2006 Major Indoor Soccer League Dispersal Draft by the Milwaukee Wave.

== See also ==
- William Jewell College women's soccer
