= William Jewell Cardinals =

Athletic program of William Jewell College

- University: William Jewell College
- Nickname: Cardinals
- NCAA: Division II
- Conference: GLVC (primary)
- Athletic director: Ryan Erlacher
- Location: Liberty, Missouri
- Varsity teams: 24
- Football stadium: Greene Stadium
- Basketball arena: The Mabee Center for Physical Education
- Baseball stadium: Talley Baseball Stadium
- Softball stadium: William Jewell Softball Field
- Soccer stadium: Greene Stadium
- Colors: Black and red
- Mascot: Billy J. Bird
- Website: jewellcardinals.com

The William Jewell Cardinals are the athletic teams that represent the William Jewell College, located in Liberty, Missouri, in intercollegiate sports as a member of the NCAA Division II ranks, primarily competing in the Great Lakes Valley Conference (GLVC) since the 2011–12 academic year. Prior to joining the NCAA, the Cardinals previously competed in the Heart of America Conference (HAAC) of the National Association of Intercollegiate Athletics (NAIA) from 1971–72 to 2010–11; and in the Missouri College Athletic Union (MCAU) from 1924–25 to 1970–71.

== Varsity teams ==
William Jewell competes in 25 intercollegiate varsity sports:

Men's sports	Women's sports
Baseball	Basketball
Basketball	Cross country
Cross country	Golf
Football	Lacrosse
Lacrosse	Powerlifting
Powerlifting	Soccer
Soccer	Softball
Swimming	Swimming
Tennis	Tennis
Track and field	Track and field
	Volleyball
	Wrestling

== National championships ==
=== Team ===
Sport	Association	Division	Year	Runner-up	Score
Baseball (1)	NAIA (1)	Single (1)	1968	Georgia Southern	4–3 (13 inn.)
