= 1968 NCAA College Division baseball tournament =

- Season: 1968
- Teams: 16
- Finals site: Meador Park; Springfield, Missouri
- Champions: Chapman (1st title)
- Runner-up: Delta State (1st CWS Appearance)
- Winning coach: Paul Deese (1st title)
- MOP: Tony Spono (Chapman)

The 1968 NCAA College Division baseball tournament was the first edition of the NCAA College Division baseball tournament, now known as the NCAA Division II baseball tournament. The College Division had previously separated from the University Division in 1957. The 16-team tournament determined the champion of the 1968 season. The Chapman Panthers won the championship by defeating the Delta State Statesmen.

== Format ==
Sixteen teams were selected to participate, divided into four regions of four teams each. Each region completed a double-elimination round, with the winners advancing to the finals. The finals, made up of the four regional champions, also competed in a double-elimination format.

== Regionals ==
=== East Regional ===
Team	Wins	Losses
Long Island	4	1
Springfield	2	2
Jacksonville	1	2
Belmont Abbey	0	2

=== Mideast Regional ===
Team	Wins	Losses
Delta State	3	1
Middle Tennessee	3	2
Illinois State	1	2
Wittenberg	0	2

=== Midwest Regional ===
Team	Wins	Losses
Arkansas State	2	0
Minnesota State	1	1
CSU–Pueblo	1	1
Northern Iowa	0	2

=== West Regional ===
Team	Wins	Losses
Chapman	3	0
Seattle Pacific	2	2
Sacramento State	1	2
Portland State	0	2

== Finals ==
=== Participants ===
School	Conference	Record (conference)	Head coach	Previous finals appearances	Best finals finish	Finals record
Arkansas State	Southland Conference	22–12–1	J. A. Tomlinson	0 (last: none)	none	0–0
Chapman	CCAA	26–17	Paul Deese	0 (last: none)	none	0–0
Delta State		20–22–1	Don Ward	0 (last: none)	none	0–0
Long Island	Metropolitan Collegiate Conference	26–5	Dick Vining	0 (last: none)	none	0–0

=== Results ===
==== Bracket ====
Upper round 1
Chapman	11
Long Island	8
Arkansas State	1
Delta State	3
Lower round 1
Long Island	3
Arkansas State	10

Upper final
Chapman	3
Delta State	0
Lower final
Delta State	4
Arkansas State	3

Final
Chapman	11	—
Delta State	0	—

==== Game results ====
Game	Winner	Score	Loser	Notes
Game 1	Chapman	11–8	Long Island	
Game 2	Delta State	3–1	Arkansas State	
Game 3	Arkansas State	10–3	Long Island	Long Island eliminated
Game 4	Chapman	3–0	Delta State	
Game 5	Delta State	4–3	Arkansas State	Arkansas State eliminated
Game 6	Chapman	11–0	Delta State	Chapman wins National Championship

== See also ==
- 1968 NCAA University Division baseball tournament
- 1968 NAIA World Series
