= 1968 NCAA University Division baseball season =

Baseball season

NCAA tournament

College World Series
- Champions: USC (5th title)
- Runners-up: Southern Illinois (1st CWS Appearance)
- Winning coach: Rod Dedeaux (5th title)
- MOP: Bill Seinsoth (Southern California)

Seasons
- ← 1967 1969 →

The 1968 NCAA University Division baseball season, play of college baseball in the United States organized by the National Collegiate Athletic Association (NCAA) began in the spring of 1968. The season progressed through the regular season and concluded with the 1968 College World Series. The College World Series, held for the twenty second time in 1968, consisted of one team from each of eight geographical districts and was held in Omaha, Nebraska at Johnny Rosenblatt Stadium as a double-elimination tournament. Southern California claimed the championship.

== Realignment ==
- Texas Tech joined the Southwest Conference, leaving the ranks of independents.

== Conference winners ==
This is a partial list of conference champions from the 1968 season. Each of the eight geographical districts chose, by various methods, the team that would represent them in the NCAA tournament. 10 teams earned automatic bids by winning their conference championship while 17 teams earned at-large selections.

Conference	Regular season winner
Atlantic Coast Conference	NC State
Big Eight Conference	Oklahoma State
Big Ten Conference	Minnesota
EIBL	Harvard
Mid-American Conference	Ohio
Pacific-8 Conference	Southern California
Southeastern Conference	Alabama
Southern Conference	East Carolina
Southwest Conference	Texas
Yankee Conference	Connecticut

== Conference standings ==
The following is an incomplete list of conference standings:

1968 Big Eight Conference baseball standings
	Conf.				Overall
Team	W		L	PCT	W		L	PCT
No. 5 Oklahoma State ‍†‍‍^{y}	15	–	3	.833	23	–	9	.719
Kansas State ‍‍‍	13	–	7	.650	15	–	16	.484
Oklahoma ‍‍‍	10	–	8	.556	13	–	14	.481
Iowa State ‍‍‍	9	–	9	.500	11	–	16	.407
Missouri ‍‍‍	9	–	11	.450	11	–	16	.407
Colorado ‍‍‍	6	–	10	.375	9	–	13	.409
Nebraska ‍‍‍	7	–	13	.350	10	–	15	.400
Kansas ‍‍‍	5	–	13	.278	7	–	10	.412
† – Conference champion y – Invited to the NCAA tournament As of June 30, 1968; Rankings from Collegiate Baseball

1968 Athletic Association of Western Universities baseball standings
	Conf.				Overall
Team	W		L	PCT	W		L	PCT
No. 1 Southern California ‍†‍‍^{y}	16	–	2	.889	43	–	12	.782
No. 26 Stanford ‍‍‍	13	–	4	.765	36	–	12	.750
Washington State ‍‍‍	11	–	7	.611	29	–	9	.763
UCLA ‍‍‍	11	–	9	.550	35	–	20	.636
Oregon ‍‍‍	8	–	10	.444		–		–
California ‍‍‍	7	–	12	.368	24	–	24	.500
Oregon State ‍‍‍	6	–	12	.333	23	–	13	.639
Washington ‍‍‍	2	–	18	.100	15	–	26	.366
† – Conference champion y – Invited to the NCAA tournament As of June 30, 1968; Rankings from Collegiate Baseball

1968 Southwest Conference baseball standings
	Conf.				Overall
Team	W		L	PCT	W		L	PCT
No. 6 Texas ‍†‍‍^{y}	12	–	4	.750	23	–	11	.676
TCU ‍‍‍	13	–	5	.722	20	–	9	.690
Texas A&M ‍‍‍	10	–	5	.667	21	–	7	.750
Baylor ‍‍‍	9	–	7	.563	14	–	13	.519
SMU ‍‍‍	7	–	11	.389	10	–	14	.417
Rice ‍‍‍	6	–	12	.333	10	–	15	.400
Texas Tech ‍‍‍	2	–	15	.118	9	–	20	.310
† – Conference champion y – Invited to the NCAA tournament As of June 30, 1968; Rankings from Collegiate Baseball

== College World Series ==
The 1968 season marked the twenty second NCAA baseball tournament, which culminated with the eight team College World Series. The College World Series was held in Omaha, Nebraska. The eight teams played a double-elimination format, with Southern California claiming their fifth championship with a 4–3 win over Southern Illinois in the final.

Upper round 1
Harvard	0
St. John's	2
Southern Illinois	6
NC State	7
Texas	5
Oklahoma State	8
BYU	3
USC	5

Upper round 2
St. John's	3^{12}
NC State	2
Oklahoma State	5
USC	6
Lower round 1
Harvard	1
Southern Illinois	2^{11}
Texas	7
BYU	0

Upper final
St. John's	6
USC	7
Lower round 2
Southern Illinois	7
Oklahoma State	1
Texas	5
NC State	6

Semifinals
USC	2
NC State	0
Southern Illinois	15
St. John's	0

Final
USC	4
Southern Illinois	3
