= 1968 Texas Longhorns baseball team =

University baseball team in the 1968 season

1968 Texas Longhorns baseball

SWC champions

College World Series, 1–2
- Conference: Southwest Conference
- Record: 23–11 (12–4 SWC)
- Head coach: Cliff Gustafson (1st year)
- Home stadium: Clark Field

1968 Southwest Conference baseball standings
	Conf.				Overall
Team	W		L	PCT	W		L	PCT
No. 6 Texas ‍†‍‍^{y}	12	–	4	.750	23	–	11	.676
TCU ‍‍‍	13	–	5	.722	20	–	9	.690
Texas A&M ‍‍‍	10	–	5	.667	21	–	7	.750
Baylor ‍‍‍	9	–	7	.563	14	–	13	.519
SMU ‍‍‍	7	–	11	.389	10	–	14	.417
Rice ‍‍‍	6	–	12	.333	10	–	15	.400
Texas Tech ‍‍‍	2	–	15	.118	9	–	20	.310
† – Conference champion y – Invited to the NCAA tournament As of June 30, 1968; Rankings from Collegiate Baseball

The 1968 Texas Longhorns baseball team represented the University of Texas at Austin in the 1968 NCAA University Division baseball season. The Longhorns played their home games at Clark Field. The team was coached by Cliff Gustafson in his 1st season at Texas.

The Longhorns reached the College World Series, finishing tied for fifth with a second round win over BYU and losses to Oklahoma State and semifinalist NC State.

== Personnel ==
=== Roster ===
1968 Texas Longhorns roster
Pitchers: 4 - Dennis D. Enderlin; 5 - James Street; 10 - Natividad Salazar; 17 - Larry Hardy; 19 - Larry Elwood Horton; 22 - Michael Allen Peebles; Catchers: 3 - Tommy Harmon; Manager: Gordon Lakey	Infielders: 1 - Louis Lee Bagwell; 9 - Patrick John Amos; 12 - David Hall; - Robert Snoddy; Outfielders: 13 - Jack Miller; 14 - Pat Brown; 23 - Randal C. Peschel	Utility: 2 - James F. Hunt; 6 - Dennis Wayne Kasper; 7 - John Langerhans; 11 - Douglass Kirk Fell; - George Nauert

== Schedule and results ==
Legend
Texas win
Texas loss
Tie

1968 Texas Longhorns baseball game log
Regular season

February
Date	Opponent	Site/stadium	Score	Overall record	SWC record
Feb 23	Oklahoma*	Clark Field • Austin, TX	L 1–2	0–1	
Feb 24	Oklahoma*	Clark Field • Austin, TX	W 4–1	1–1	
Feb 24	Oklahoma*	Clark Field • Austin, TX	W 6–4	2–1	
Feb 27	Sam Houston State*	Clark Field • Austin, TX	W 9–8	3–1	
Feb 28	Sam Houston State*	Clark Field • Austin, TX	W 9–1	4–1	

March
Date	Opponent	Site/stadium	Score–	Overall record	SWC record
Mar 2	at Texas A&M	Kyle Baseball Field • College Park, TX	L 0–1	4–2	0–1
Mar 5	TCU	Clark Field • Austin, TX	L 9–10	4–3	0–2
Mar 7	Texas Lutheran*	Clark Field • Austin, TX	W 1–0	5–3	
Mar 9	at SMU	Dallas, TX	L 4–5	5–4	0–3
Mar 16	Rice	Clark Field • Austin, TX	W 7–3	6–4	1–3
Mar 18	Minnesota*	Clark Field • Austin, TX	L 5–8	6–5	
Mar 19	Minnesota*	Clark Field • Austin, TX	L 1–8	6–6	
Mar 22	at Texas Tech	Lubbock, TX	W 7–5	7–6	2–3
Mar 23	at Texas Tech	Lubbock, TX	W 7–2	8–6	3–3
Mar 23	at Texas Tech	Lubbock, TX	W 2–1	9–6	4–3
Mar 29	SMU	Clark Field • Austin, TX	W 7–2	10–6	5–3
Mar 30	SMU	Clark Field • Austin, TX	W 6–5	11–6	6–3

April/May
Date	Opponent	Site/stadium	Score	Overall record	SWC record
Apr 3	Baylor	Clark Field • Austin, TX	W 2–0	12–6	7–3
Apr 4	Baylor	Clark Field • Austin, TX	W 10–6	13–6	8–3
Apr 4	Baylor	Clark Field • Austin, TX	W 8–7	14–6	9–3
Apr 10	at Trinity (TX)*	San Antonio, TX	W 9–4	15–6	
Apr 11	at St. Mary's (TX)*	San Antonio, TX	W 1–0	16–6	
Apr 19	at TCU	TCU Diamond • Fort Worth, TX	L 5–7	16–7	9–4
Apr 20	at TCU	TCU Diamond • Fort Worth, TX	W 4–3	17–7	10–4
Apr 26	at Rice	Houston, TX	W 4–2	18–7	11–4
Apr 27	at Rice	Houston, TX	W 8–3	19–7	12–4
May 1	St. Mary's (TX)*	Clark Field • Austin, TX	W 9–0	20–7	
May 3	Trinity (TX)*	Clark Field • Austin, TX	L 1–3	20–8	

Postseason

District 6 playoffs
Date	Opponent	Site/stadium	Score	Overall record	NCAAT record
May 29	Texas–Pan American	Clark Field • Austin, TX	W 3–0	21–8	1–0
May 30	Texas–Pan American	Clark Field • Austin, TX	L 1–2^{10}	21–9	1–1
May 31	Texas–Pan American	Clark Field • Austin, TX	W 10–6	22–9	2–1

College World Series
Date	Opponent	Site/stadium	Score	Overall record	CWS record
June 11	Oklahoma State	Johnny Rosenblatt Stadium • Omaha, NE	L 5–8	22–10	0–1
June 12	BYU	Johnny Rosenblatt Stadium • Omaha, NE	W 7–0	23–10	1–1
June 13	NC State	Johnny Rosenblatt Stadium • Omaha, NE	L 5–6	23–11	1–2
