= 1968 Southern Illinois Salukis baseball team =

Illinois college baseball team

1968 Southern Illinois Salukis baseball

District 4 champions

College World Series, Runner-Up
- Conference: Independent

Ranking
- Coaches: No. 2
- CB: No. 2
- Record: 37–14
- Head coach: Joe Lutz (3rd season)
- Home stadium: Abe Martin Field

The 1968 Southern Illinois Salukis baseball team represented the University of Southern Illinois in the 1968 NCAA University Division baseball season. The Salukis played their home games at Abe Martin Field. The team was coached by Joe Lutz in his 3rd season at Southern Illinois.

The Salukis lost the College World Series, defeated by the USC Trojans in the championship game.

== Roster ==
1968 Southern Illinois Salukis roster
Pitchers: Don Kirkland; Howard Nickason; Skip Pitlock; John Susce	Catchers: Tom Keyser; Infielders: Barry O’Sullivan - Junior	Outfielders: Jerry Bond - Sophomore; Mike Rogodzinski - Sophomore; Unknown: Bob Ash; Bob Blakley; Terry Brumfield; Bill Clark; William Clark; Randy Coker; Jerry Paetzhold; Bob Sedik; Jerry Smith; Bob Warn

== Schedule and results ==
Legend
Southern Illinois win
Southern Illinois loss
Southern Illinois tie

1968 Southern Illinois Salukis baseball game log
Regular season (31–12)

March (7–8)
Date	Opponent	Site/stadium	Score	Overall record
March 16	at New Mexico	Lobo Field • Albuquerque, New Mexico	3–8	0–1
March 16	at New Mexico	Lobo Field • Albuquerque, New Mexico	10–4	1–1
March 18	at Arizona State	Phoenix Municipal Stadium • Phoenix, Arizona	0–8	1–2
March 19	at Arizona State	Phoenix Municipal Stadium • Phoenix, Arizona	0–4	1–3
March 20	at Arizona State	Phoenix Municipal Stadium • Phoenix, Arizona	3–1	2–3
March 21	at Arizona	Jerry Kindall Field at Frank Sancet Stadium • Tucson, Arizona	3–6	2–4
March 22	at Arizona	Jerry Kindall Field at Frank Sancet Stadium • Tucson, Arizona	4–2	3–4
March 23	at Arizona	Jerry Kindall Field at Frank Sancet Stadium • Tucson, Arizona	6–4	4–4
March 23	at Arizona	Jerry Kindall Field at Frank Sancet Stadium • Tucson, Arizona	6–7	4–5
March 24	vs Northern Arizona	Unknown • Unknown	1–8	4–6
March 25	vs Grand Canyon	Unknown • Unknown	7–4	5–6
March 29	vs Wake Forest	Seminole Field • Tallahassee, Florida	4–2	6–6
March 29	at Florida State	Seminole Field • Tallahassee, Florida	0–6	6–7
March 30	vs Wake Forest	Seminole Field • Tallahassee, Florida	7–0	7–7
March 30	at Florida State	Seminole Field • Tallahassee, Florida	4–8	7–8

April (18–3)
Date	Opponent	Site/stadium	Score	Overall record
April 1	at Florida State	Seminole Field • Tallahassee, Florida	3–5	7–9
April 2	Monmouth	Abe Martin Field • Carbondale, Illinois	4–0	8–9
April 2	Monmouth	Abe Martin Field • Carbondale, Illinois	3–1	9–9
April 5	Memphis State	Abe Martin Field • Carbondale, Illinois	5–15	9–10
April 9	McKendree	Abe Martin Field • Carbondale, Illinois	11–1	10–10
April 10	Wisconsin–Stevens Point	Abe Martin Field • Carbondale, Illinois	12–2	11–10
April 11	Wisconsin–Stevens Point	Abe Martin Field • Carbondale, Illinois	14–3	12–10
April 12	Air Force	Abe Martin Field • Carbondale, Illinois	3–1	13–10
April 12	Moorhead State	Abe Martin Field • Carbondale, Illinois	2–0	14–10
April 15	MacMurray	Abe Martin Field • Carbondale, Illinois	5–1	15–10
April 20	Ohio State	Abe Martin Field • Carbondale, Illinois	8–1	16–10
April 20	Ohio State	Abe Martin Field • Carbondale, Illinois	12–4	17–10
April 21	Ohio State	Abe Martin Field • Carbondale, Illinois	3–1	18–10
April 21	Ohio State	Abe Martin Field • Carbondale, Illinois	0–7	18–11
April 23	at Indiana State	Unknown • Terre Haute, Indiana	18–5	19–11
April 23	at Indiana State	Unknown • Terre Haute, Indiana	14–8	20–11
April 26	at Washington (MO)	Unknown • St. Louis, Missouri	7–3	21–11
April 27	Western Kentucky	Abe Martin Field • Carbondale, Illinois	4–0	22–11
April 27	Western Kentucky	Abe Martin Field • Carbondale, Illinois	11–2	23–11
April 28	at Quincy	Unknown • Quincy, Illinois	5–3	24–11
April 30	Greenville	Abe Martin Field • Carbondale, Illinois	9–0	25–11

May (6–1)
Date	Opponent	Site/stadium	Score	Overall record
May 3	at Wyoming	Cowboy Field • Laramie, Wyoming	8–5	26–11
May 4	at Wyoming	Cowboy Field • Laramie, Wyoming	2–1	27–11
May 4	at Wyoming	Cowboy Field • Laramie, Wyoming	3–9	27–12
May 7	Evansville	Abe Martin Field • Carbondale, Illinois	3–2	28–12
May 12	Saint Louis	Abe Martin Field • Carbondale, Illinois	5–4	29–12
May 17	at UT Martin	Unknown • Martin, Tennessee	3–0	30–12
May 24	Illinois College	Abe Martin Field • Carbondale, Illinois	14–0	31–12

Postseason (6–2)

District IV Playoff (3–1)
Date	Opponent	Site/stadium	Score	Overall record
May 30	vs Ohio	Delta Field • Minneapolis, Minnesota	6–3	32–12
June 1	at Minnesota	Delta Field • Minneapolis, Minnesota	10–9	33–12
June 2	vs Ohio	Delta Field • Minneapolis, Minnesota	3–0	34–12

1968 College World Series (3–2)
Date	Opponent	Site/stadium	Score	Overall record
June 10	vs NC State	Johnny Rosenblatt Stadium • Omaha, Nebraska	6–7	34–13
June 11	vs Harvard	Johnny Rosenblatt Stadium • Omaha, Nebraska	2–1	35–13
June 13	vs Oklahoma State	Johnny Rosenblatt Stadium • Omaha, Nebraska	7–1	36–13
June 14	vs St. John's	Johnny Rosenblatt Stadium • Omaha, Nebraska	15–0	37–13
June 15	vs USC	Johnny Rosenblatt Stadium • Omaha, Nebraska	3–4	37–14

Schedule source:

== Awards and honors ==
Barry O’Sullivan

- All Tournament Team

Jerry Bond

- All Tournament Team

Mike Rogodzinski

- All Tournament Team
