= Glen Tuckett =

American college baseball coach (1927–2021)

- Infielder
- Born: December 11, 1927; Salt Lake City, Utah, U.S.
- Died: October 26, 2021 (aged 93); Provo, Utah, U.S.
- Batted: Right Threw: Unknown
Medals
Men's baseball
Manager for United States
Amateur World Series
Gold medal – first place	1974 St. Petersburg	Team

Glen Tuckett (December 11, 1927 – October 26, 2021) was the coach of the Brigham Young University (BYU) baseball team from 1959 to 1976 and then BYU athletic director from 1976 to 1994.

Tuckett was raised in Murray, Utah. Tuckett played for the Salt Lake Bees and later for Salem's team. Prior to coming to BYU Tuckett coached the Calvary Dodgers. In 1995 Tuckett was appointed interim director of the University of Alabama athletic program in the wake of an NCAA investigation of violations in the program.

After his retirement Tuckett was recognized with the Homer Rice Award. In 2007, he was given the BYU Distinguished Service award.

Tuckett was a Latter-day Saint.

== Bibliography ==
- Mormon Times, April 20, 2010
- Minor league stats for Tuckett
- Deseret News, September 22, 1994
- Deseret News, March 1, 1951
- "People in the Church", Church News, September 16, 1995
