= Off-speed pitch =

Baseball pitch thrown at a slower speed than a fastball

In baseball, an off-speed pitch is a pitch thrown at a slower speed than a fastball. Breaking balls and changeups are the two most common types of off-speed pitches. Very slow pitches which require the batter to provide most of the power on contact through bat speed are known as "junk" and include the knuckleball and the Eephus pitch, a sort of extreme changeup. The specific goals of off-speed pitches may vary, but in general they are used to disrupt the batter's timing, thereby lessening his chances of hitting the ball solidly or at all. Virtually all professional pitchers have at least one off-speed pitch in their repertoire. Despite the fact that most of these pitches break in some way (for instance, horizontally, vertically, gradually, or late in their trajectory), batters are sometimes able to anticipate them due to hints that the pitcher gives, such as changes in arm angle, arm speed, or placement of fingers.

== Types of off-speed pitches ==
Different off-speed pitches are thrown by manipulating the fingers' placement in relation to the seams of the baseball as well as manipulation of the wrist angle upon release of the ball. While there is no technical limit to the various ways in which off-speed pitches can be thrown, there are commonly used mechanics for each pitch type.

=== Curveball ===
When thrown, a curveball appears to rise out of the pitchers hand initially and is then followed by a large bending arc downward as the pitch nears home plate. It is held by placing the middle finger along one seam of the baseball with the index finger right next to it while the thumb is placed on the opposite these two fingers. Upon release, the pitcher will snap their wrist to supination in order to create the desired arc and trajectory.

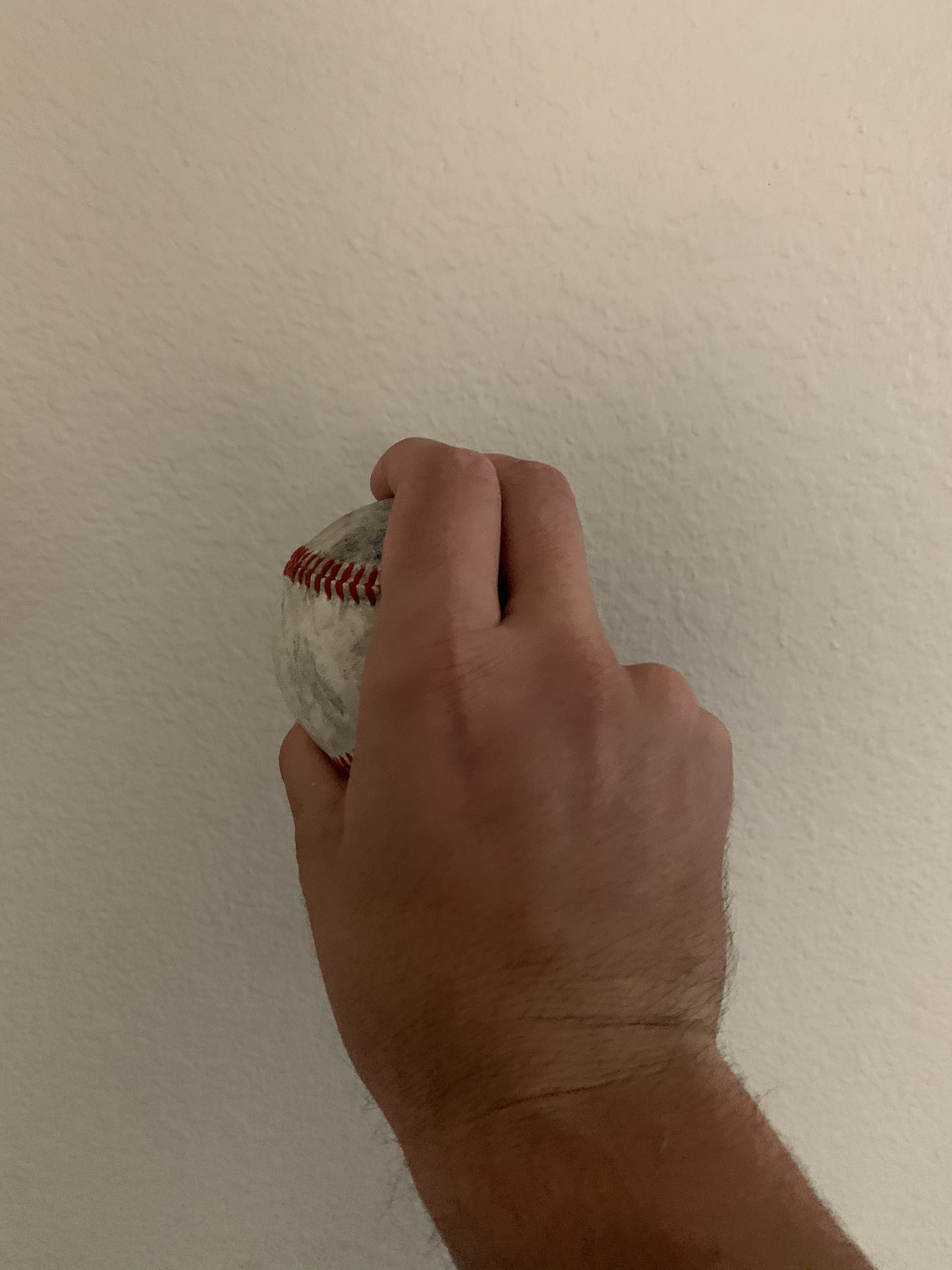
Curveball grip

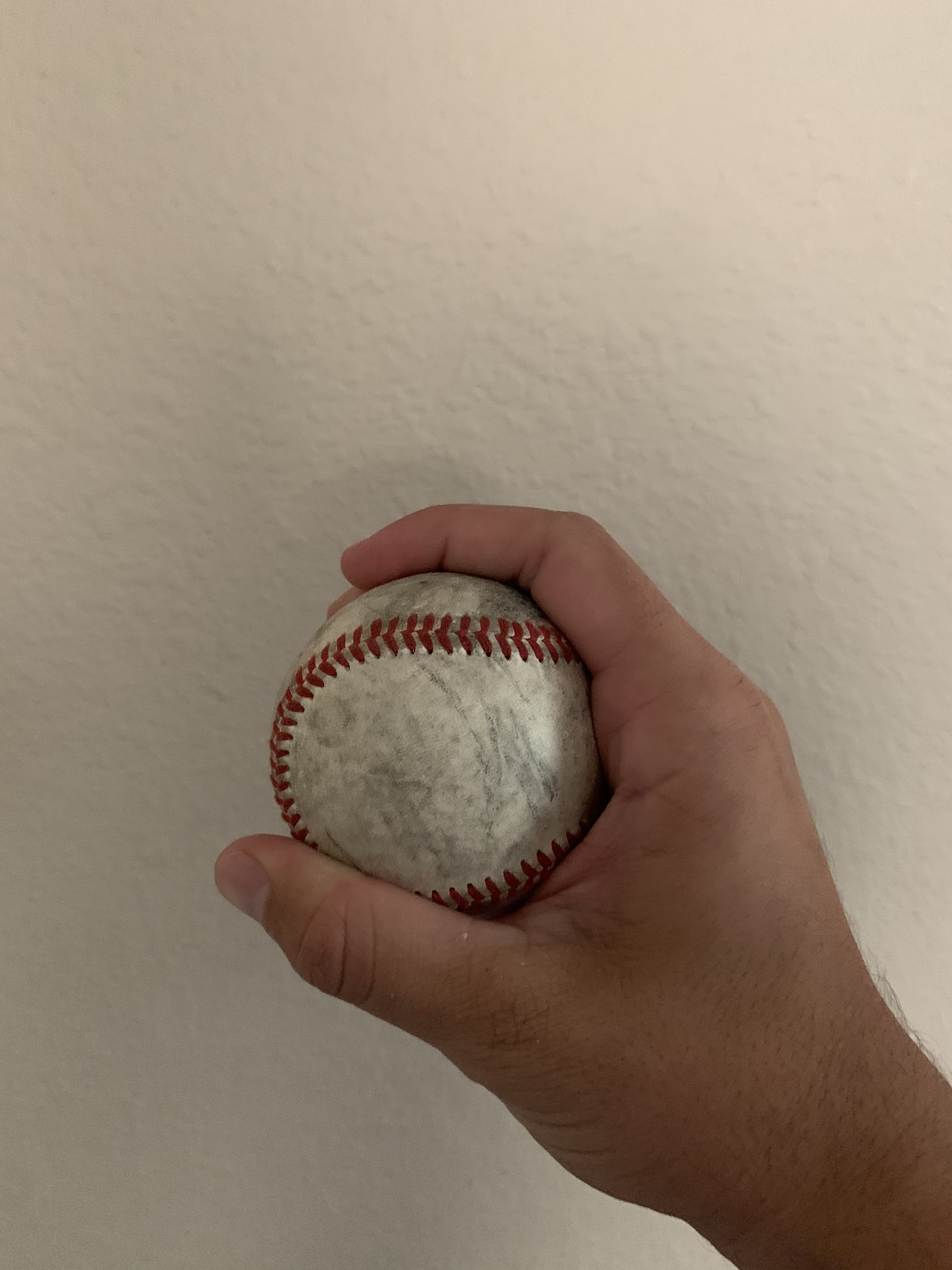
Curveball grip (side)

=== Slider ===
A slider is a pitch that breaks more horizontally towards the pitcher's glove side. It is generally thrown harder than a curveball with sharper spin. A slider is held similarly to the curveball however more pressure is applied with the middle finger. Unlike the curveball, no wrist manipulation is needed at release. The pressure from the finger on the outside of the ball creates the horizontal trajectory and the lack of wrist manipulation results in a faster pitch than the curveball.

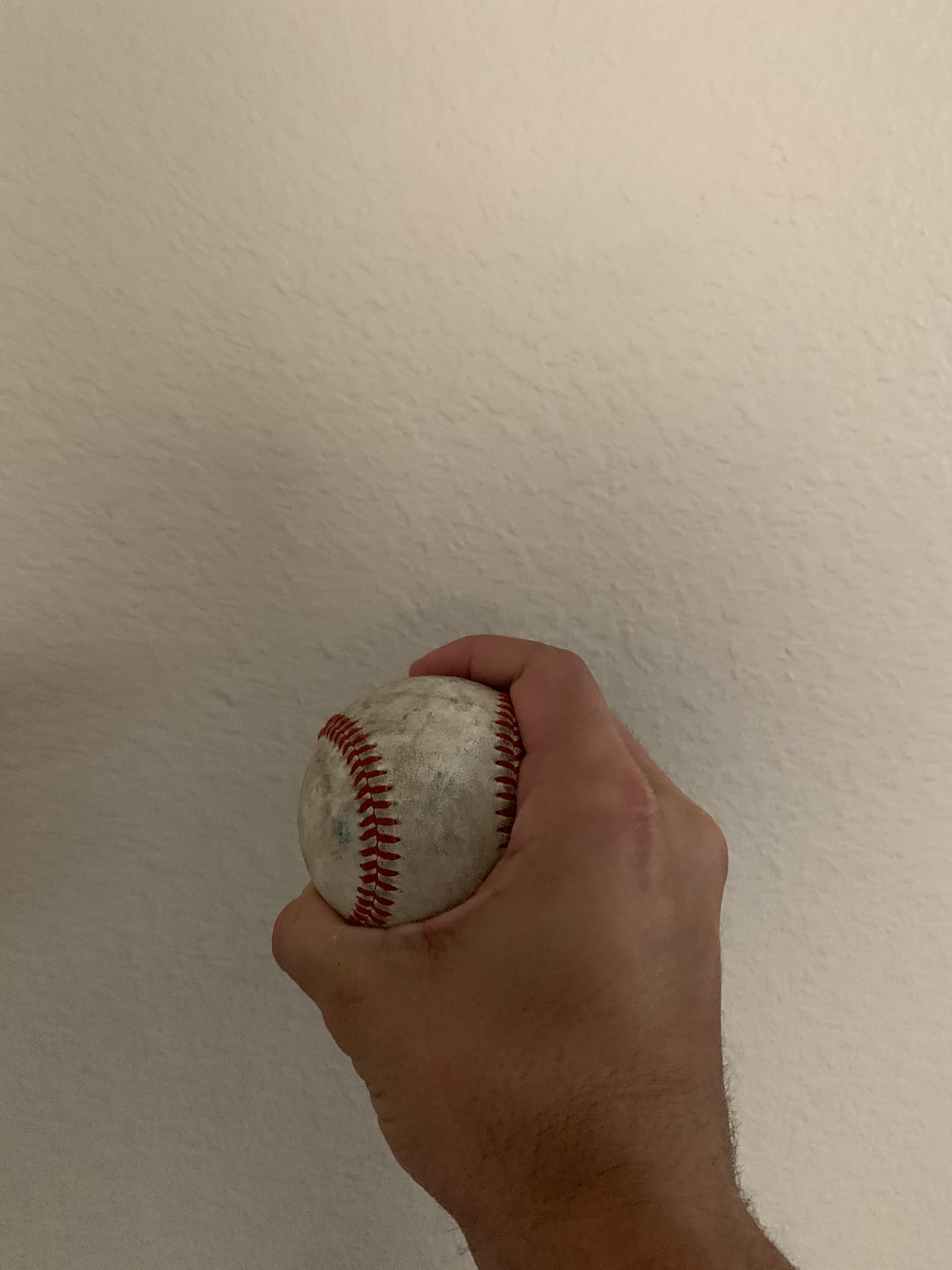
Slider grip

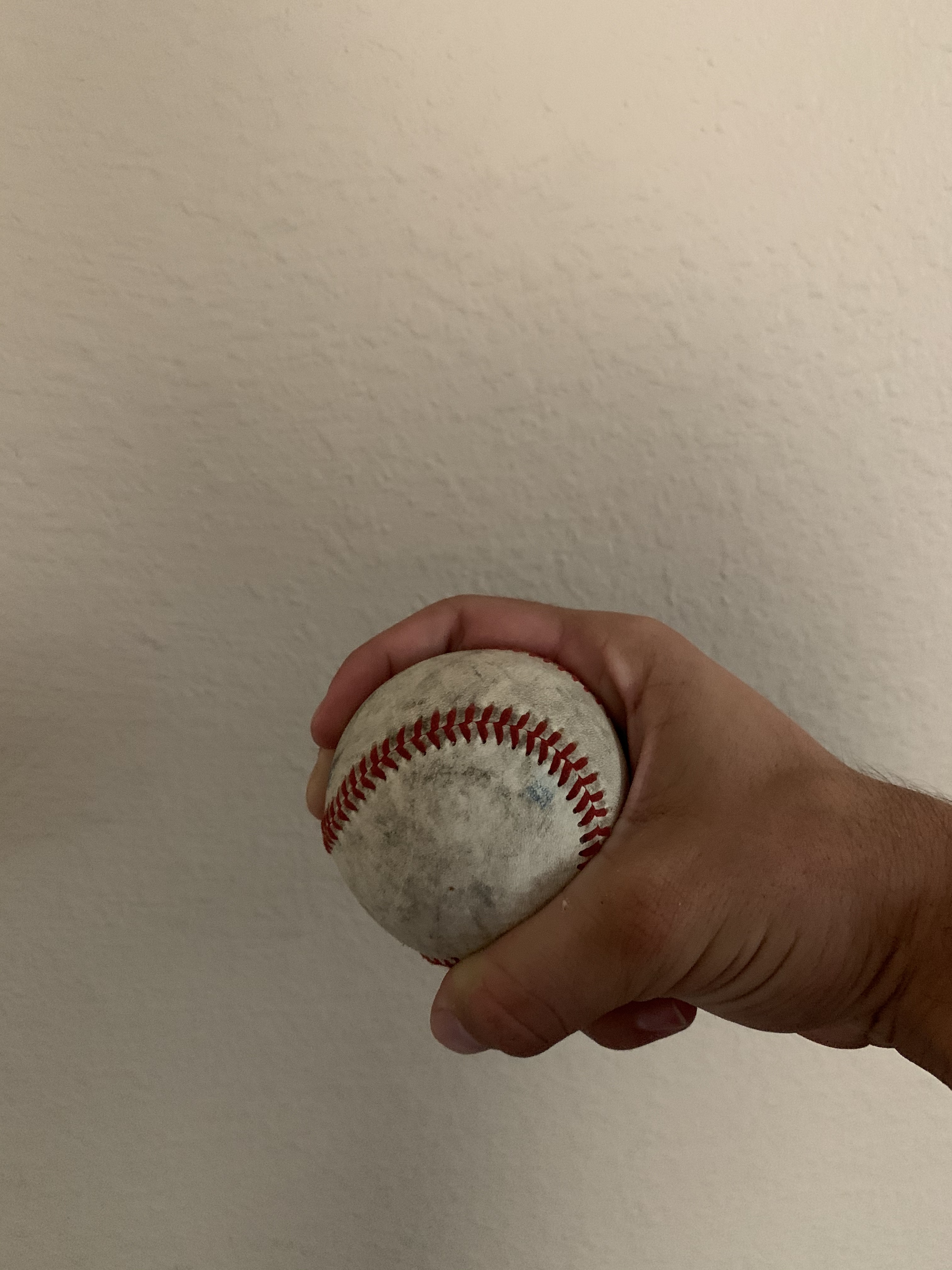
Slider grip (side)

=== Splitter ===
While considered an off-speed pitch, a splitter is also commonly referred to as a split-finger fastball although the speed of the pitch is quite slow (however among off-speed pitches it is fast, with a similar speed to that of a cutter). A splitter initially travels straight out of the hand, however it drops straight down suddenly as it nears home plate. The splitter is appropriately named after the way in which it is gripped. It is held by digging the ball deep between the index and middle fingers as if the ball is splitting them apart.

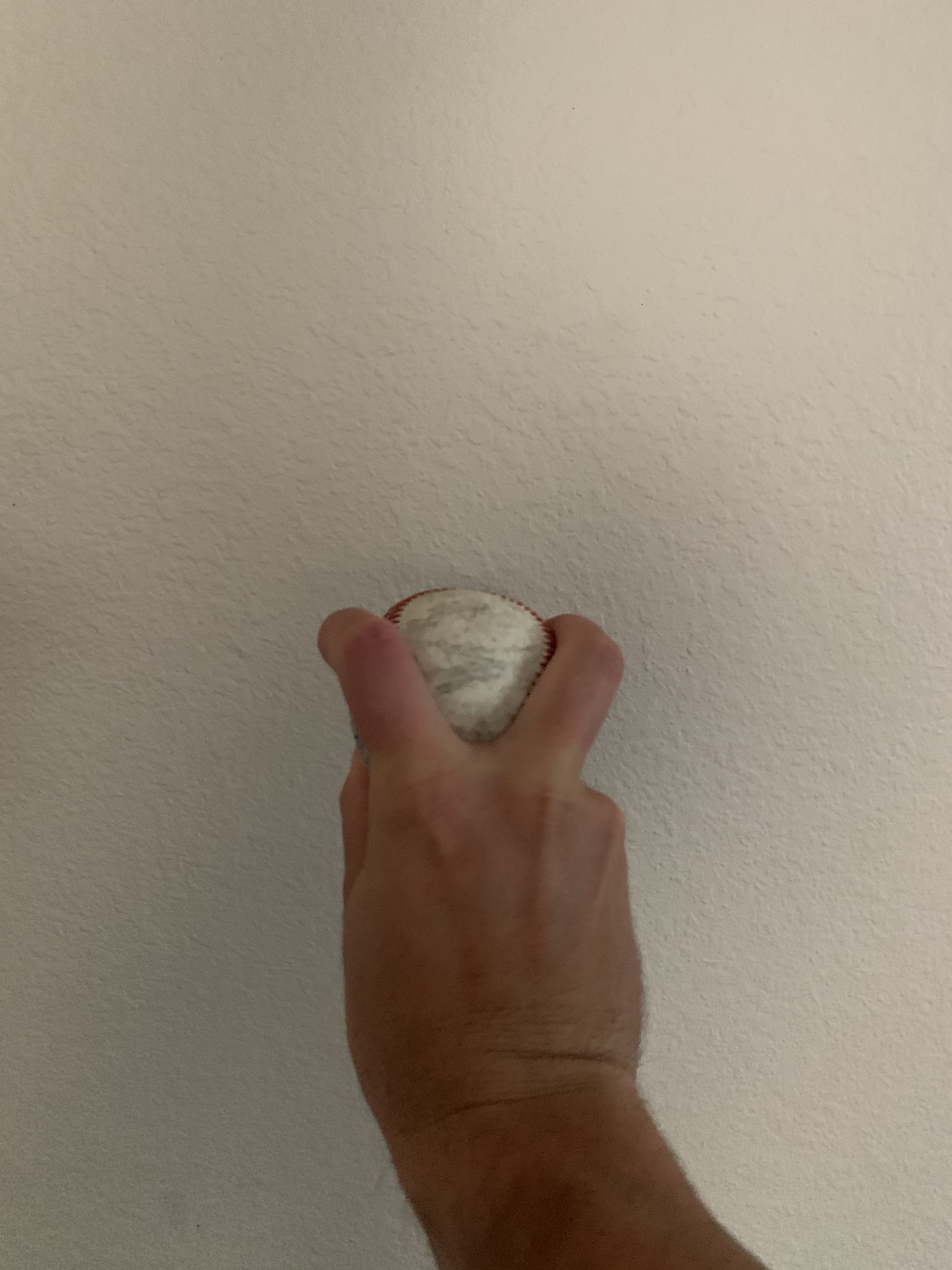
Splitter grip

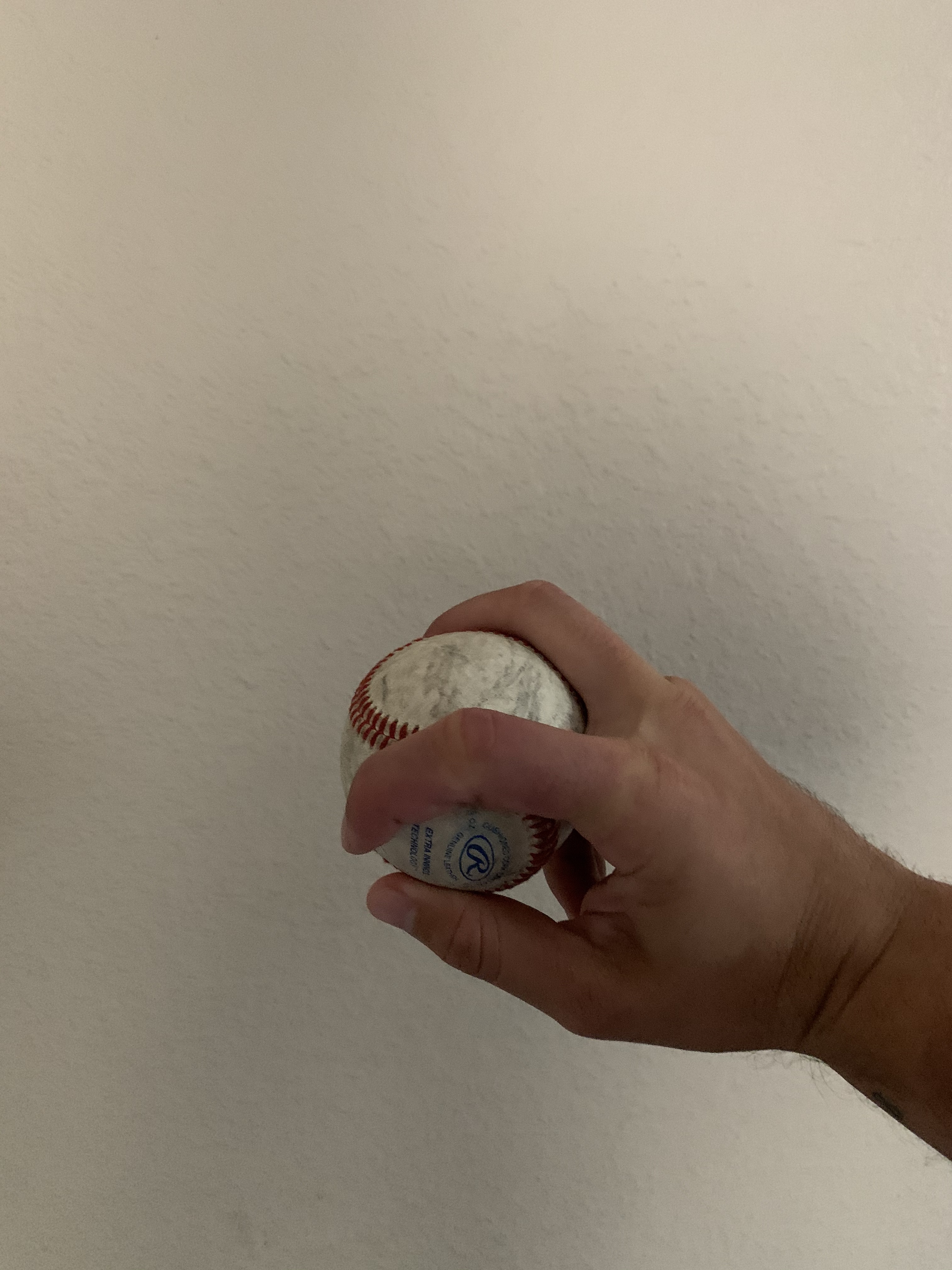
Splitter grip (side)

=== Changeup ===
The changeup is a pitch intended to look like a fastball upon release, however the way in which it is gripped and thrown causes it to be much slower and start to drop down and to the pitcher's arm side. It is held like a four-seam fastball (which is why its spin can be deceiving to a batter), however the middle and ring fingers rest across the seams rather than the index and middle fingers. Upon release, the pitcher will need to manipulate the wrist into pronation which helps create the late arm side movement.

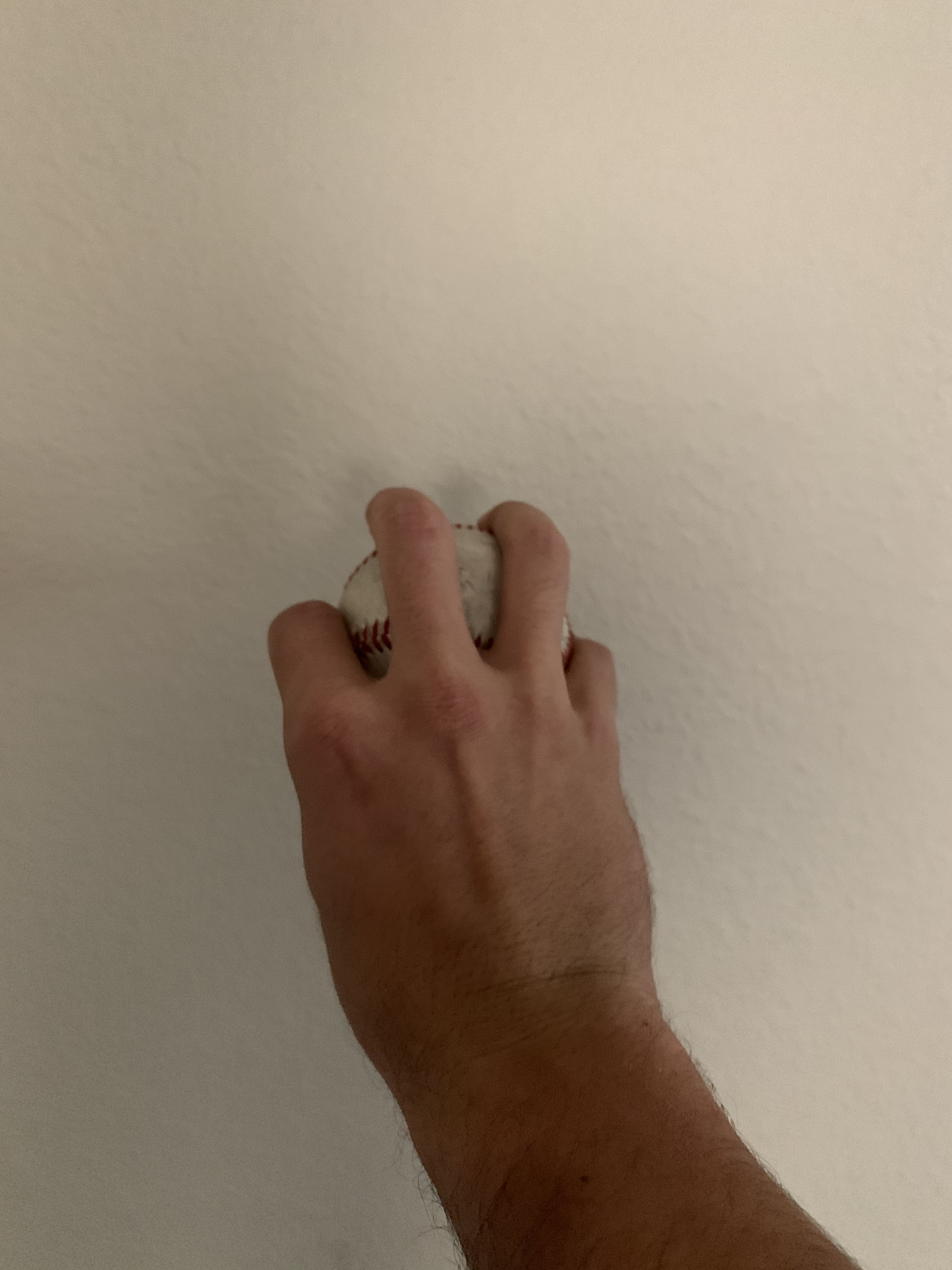
Changeup grip

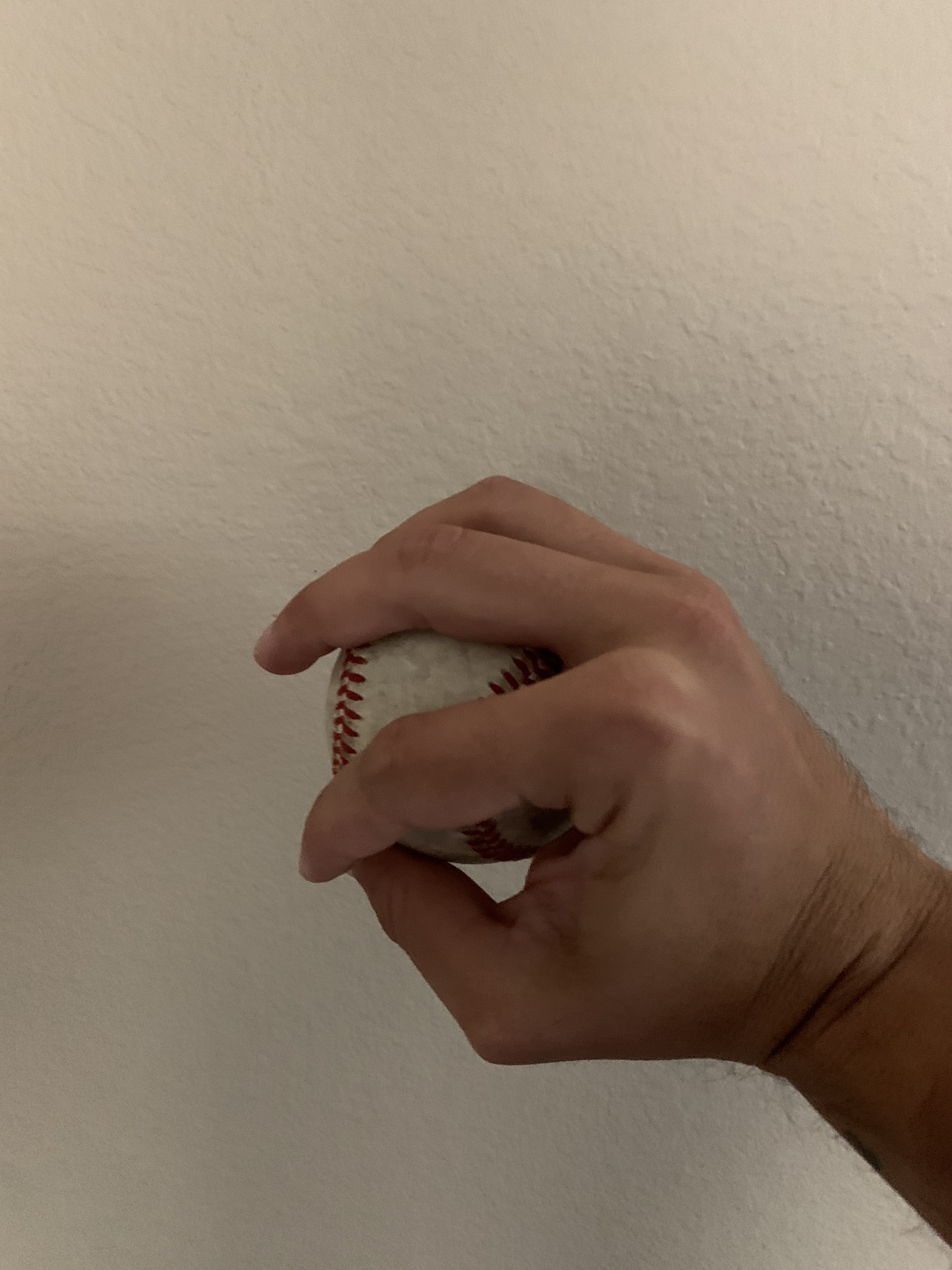
Changeup grip (side)

=== Knuckleball ===
A knuckleball is a unique pitch not often utilized by many pitchers due to its sporadic and unexpected movement, making it tough for catchers to glove it. When thrown, it has no spin and almost appears to hover unnaturally from side to side. Its name is derived from the grip as the pitcher digs the knuckles from their index, middle, and occasionally even the ring finger on one seam of the baseball. This has changed now, and many knuckleballers use a more effective grip, digging their fingertips into the ball instead. The pitch is thrown similar to a four-seam fastball, although the pitcher keeps their wrist stiff until release, letting the ball slip out of the hand.

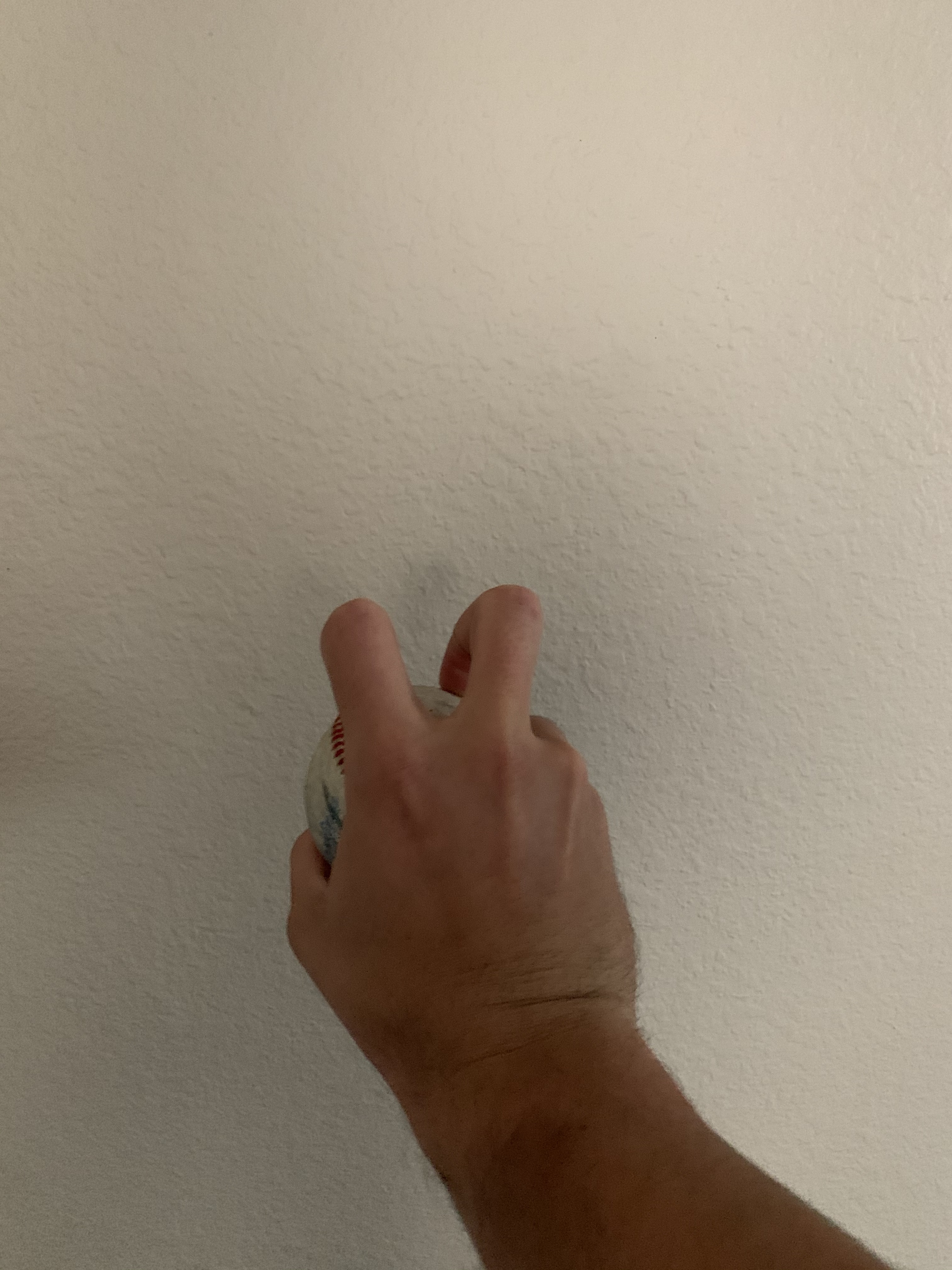
Knuckleball grip

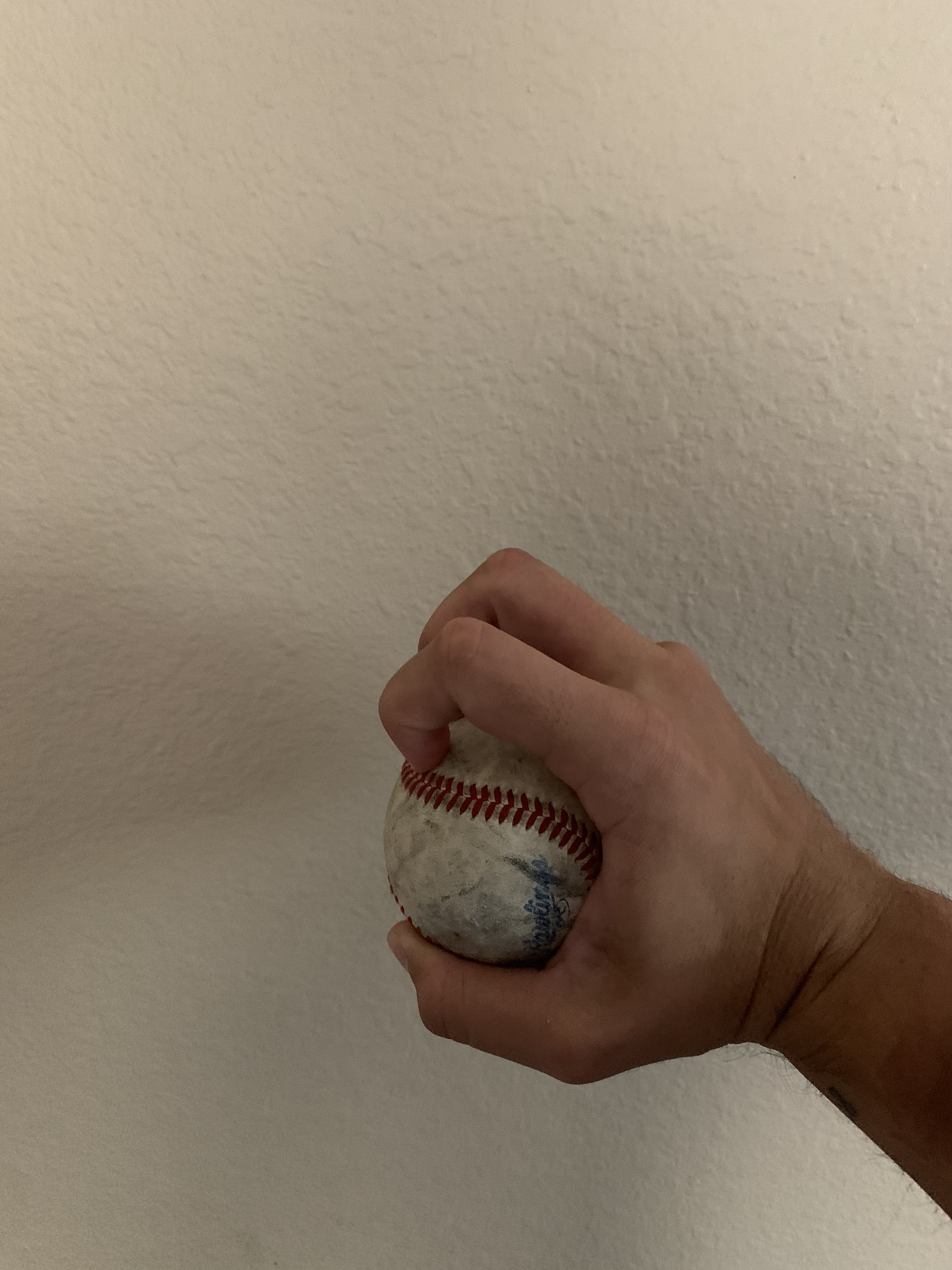
Knuckleball grip (side)

=== Screwball ===
A screwball is an off-speed breaking pitch that is thrown by a pitcher intending for it to have the opposite breaking movement of a curveball, slider and just about every other breaking pitch in a pitcher's arsenal though it usually mostly resembles a reverse curveball when thrown. This opposite break is achieved using an grip similar to a circle changeup and an unorthodox pronation of a pitcher's arm upon release. This unorthodox pronation is one of the major reasons it is one of rarest pitches thrown in professional baseball today as there is a widespread believed consensus that throwing this pitch will put extreme damage and deterioration on a pitcher's arm. This belief has been contested, as some tests have shown that it puts similar stresses on the elbow throwing a curveball or fastball does.

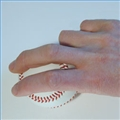
Screwball grip

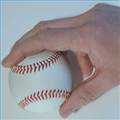
Screwball grip (side)

== History ==
The curveball is recognized as the first off-speed pitch to be thrown, and it is accredited to Candy Cummings who was playing for the Brooklyn Excelsiors in 1867. However, it was not until he joined the Brooklyn Stars and linked up with catcher Nat Hicks that his curveball was perfected. Hicks was one of the first catchers to squat right behind the batter which made catching the curveball much easier.

The slider is the next oldest pitch on record. While the true first to use the slider is largely debated, Chief Bender is cited as the first to throw the slider with his variation known as the "nickel curve". Some argue that George Blaeholder was the first to throw a true, traditional slider in the 1920s while playing with the St. Louis Browns.
