= Rockwell D. Hunt =

California historian

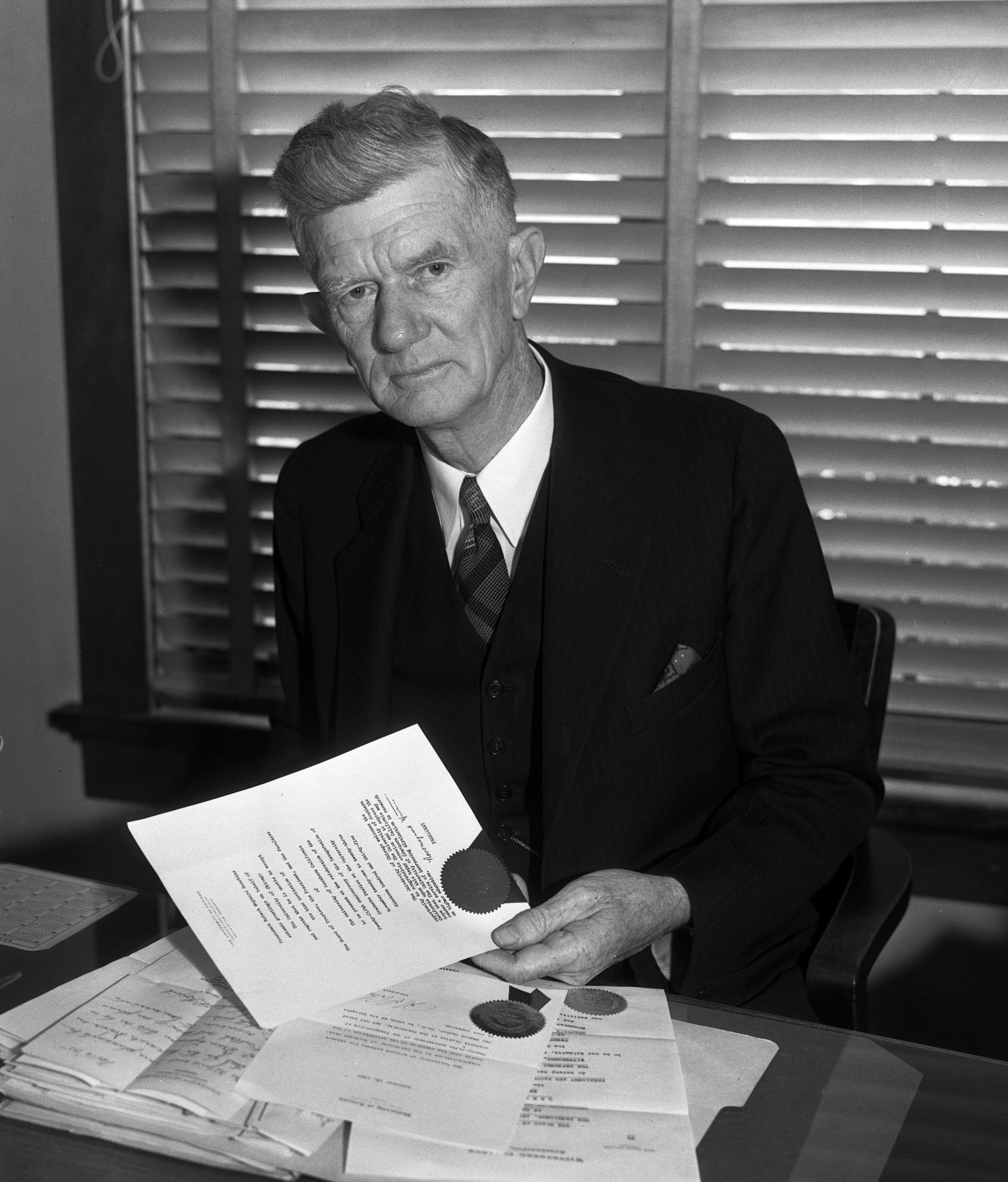
- Hunt in 1935
- Born: Rockwell Dennis Hunt; February 3, 1868; Sacramento, California, US
- Died: January 23, 1966 (aged 97); Stockton, California, US
- Occupation: Professor
- Spouse: Nancy Seavy Stuart
- Children: 4
- Relatives: Bill Lee (great-grandson)

Rockwell Dennis Hunt (February 3, 1868 – January 23, 1966) was a California historian, a professor at the University of Southern California and the University of the Pacific, and prolific author. He was named Mr. California by Governor Goodwin Knight in 1954.

== Early life ==
Hunt was born in Sacramento, California. He received his bachelor's degree from Napa College in 1890 and his doctorate from Johns Hopkins University in 1895.

== Career ==
From 1891 to 1893, he was a professor of history at Napa College. In 1895, he was a professor at the College of the Pacific (then located in San Jose). From 1902 to 1908, he was a principal at San Jose High School. He taught economics at the University of Southern California starting in 1908, and served as dean of its graduate school from 1920 to his retirement in 1945.

When Hunt turned 60 years old, he was proclaimed "Mr. California" by Governor Goodwin Knight.

After his retirement from USC, he became the first director of the California History Foundation at the University of the Pacific in Stockton, California.

Hunt's first book, Genesis of California's First Constitution was published in 1895. He published 15 books on the history of California. In 1901, he wrote a monograph of the first 50 years history of the College of the Pacific.

== Death ==
Hunt died on January 23, 1966, at the Oakdale convalescent hospital, near Stockton, California, at the age of 97. Funeral services were at the Morris Chapel at the University of the Pacific. His burial was held in Inglewood Memorial Park in Inglewood, California.

== Bibliography ==
- Ron Limbaugh, "Rockwell Dennis Hunt: Mr. California and Mr. University of the Pacific", Conference of California Historical Societies. full text
- Rockwell Dennis Hunt (1895). The Genesis of California's First Constitution (1846-49). Johns Hopkins Press.
- Rockwell Dennis Hunt (1911). California the Golden. Silver, Burdett.
- Rockwell D. Hunt (1917). "John Bidwell: A Prince Among Pioneers". Annual Publication of the Historical Society of Southern California. 10 (3): 48–56. doi:10.2307/41168744. JSTOR 41168744.
- Rockwell D. Hunt (1920). "The Committees of Vigilance of California". Annual Publication of the Historical Society of Southern California. 11 (3): 30–46. doi:10.2307/41168781. JSTOR 41168781.
- Rockwell D. Hunt (1932). California and Californians. The Lewis Publishing Co. OCLC 5041055.
