= 1968 USC Trojans baseball team =

American college baseball season

1968 USC Trojans baseball

National champions AAWU Champions
- Conference: Athletic Association of Western Universities
- CB: No. 1
- Record: 42–12–1 (16–2–1 AAWU)
- Head coach: Rod Dedeaux (27th year)
- Home stadium: Bovard Field

1968 Athletic Association of Western Universities baseball standings
| | Conf. | | | | Overall |
| Team | W | | L | PCT | W | | L | PCT |
|---|---|---|---|---|---|---|---|---|
| No. 1 Southern California ‍†‍‍^{y} | 16 | – | 2 | .889 | 43 | – | 12 | .782 |
| No. 26 Stanford ‍‍‍ | 13 | – | 4 | .765 | 36 | – | 12 | .750 |
| Washington State ‍‍‍ | 11 | – | 7 | .611 | 29 | – | 9 | .763 |
| UCLA ‍‍‍ | 11 | – | 9 | .550 | 35 | – | 20 | .636 |
| Oregon ‍‍‍ | 8 | – | 10 | .444 | | – | | – |
| California ‍‍‍ | 7 | – | 12 | .368 | 24 | – | 24 | .500 |
| Oregon State ‍‍‍ | 6 | – | 12 | .333 | 23 | – | 13 | .639 |
| Washington ‍‍‍ | 2 | – | 18 | .100 | 15 | – | 26 | .366 |
† – Conference champion y – Invited to the NCAA tournament As of June 30, 1968; Rankings from Collegiate Baseball

The 1968 USC Trojans baseball team represented the University of Southern California in the 1968 NCAA University Division baseball season. The team was coached by Rod Dedeaux in his 27th season.

The Trojans won the College World Series, defeating the Southern Illinois Salukis in the championship game.

== Roster ==
1968 USC Trojans roster
| Pitchers: Jim Barr; Bill Lee; Mike Link; John Rockwell; Jim Southworth; Bob Vaughn; Catchers: Bill Homik; Rich McCombs; Steve Sogge | Infielders: Ron Drake; Pat Harrison; Bill Hugg; Cal Meier; Chuck Ramshaw; Bill Seinsoth; Steve Tanner | Outfielders: Reid Braden; Bill Brown; Bob Gire; Jay Jaffe; Pat Kuehner; Rich Leon; Phil MacDonald; Randy Port; Coaches: Rod Dedeaux |

== Schedule ==
1968 USC Trojans baseball game log
Regular season
February

| Date | Opponent | Score | Overall record | Pac-8 record |
|---|---|---|---|---|
| February 23 | Cal Poly | 9–4 | 1–0 | – |
| February 24 | San Diego State | 5–3 | 2–0 | – |
| February 24 | San Diego State | 2–0 | 3–0 | – |
| February 28 | Cal State Los Angeles | 9–2 | 4–0 | – |

March

| Date | Opponent | Score | Overall record | Pac-8 record |
|---|---|---|---|---|
| March 1 | at Chapman | 0–2 | 4–1 | – |
| March 2 | Long Beach State | 0–1 | 4–2 | – |
| March 4 | at UC Santa Barbara | 0–3 | 4–3 | – |
| March 11 | at Cal Poly Pomona | 7–4 | 5–3 | – |
| March 12 | San Fernando Valley State | 0–3 | 5–4 | – |
| March 15 | Utah | 2–1 | 6–4 | – |
| March 16 | BYU | 0–7 | 6–5 | – |
| March 16 | BYU | 3–0 | 7–5 | – |
| March 19 | Occidental | 2–1 | 8–5 | – |
| March 22 | Long Beach State | 0–3 | 8–6 | – |
| March 25 | Pepperdine | 4–0 | 9–6 | – |
| March 26 | Cal State Los Angeles | 9–3 | 10–6 | – |
| March 29 | Westmont | 9–3 | 11–6 | – |
| March 30 | Stanford | 4–9 | 11–7 | – |

April

| Date | Opponent | Score | Overall record | Pac-8 record |
|---|---|---|---|---|
| April 2 | Chapman | 6–2 | 12–7 | – |
| April 5 | Santa Clara | 5–6 | 12–8 | – |
| | at Hawaii | 16–0 | 13–8 | – |
| | vs. Air Force | 4–0 | 14–8 | – |
| | vs. Army | 7–0 | 15–8 | – |
| | vs. Illinois | 10–4 | 16–8 | – |
| April 16 | UC Santa Barbara | 3–12 | 16–9 | – |
| April 19 | at California | 8–5 | 17–9 | 1–0 |
| April 20 | at Stanford | 3–1 | 18–9 | 2–0 |
| April 20 | at Stanford | 2–2 | 18–9–1 | 2–0–1 |
| April 23 | San Fernando Valley State | 8–6 | 19–9–1 | – |
| April 26 | Oregon State | 7–3 | 20–9–1 | 3–0–1 |
| April 27 | Oregon | 4–1 | 21–9–1 | 4–0–1 |
| April 27 | Oregon | 6–3 | 22–9–1 | 5–0–1 |
| April 29 | Washington | 9–4 | 23–9–1 | 6–0–1 |
| April 29 | Washington | 16–10 | 24–9–1 | 7–0–1 |
| April 30 | Washington State | 4–3 | 25–9–1 | 8–0–1 |

May

| Date | Opponent | Score | Overall record | Pac-8 record |
|---|---|---|---|---|
| May 3 | UCLA | 4–7 | 25–10–1 | 8–1–1 |
| May 4 | UCLA | 8–3 | 26–10–1 | 9–1–1 |
| May 7 | Cal Poly Pomona | 3–0 | 27–10–1 | – |
| May 10 | Stanford | 4–3 | 28–10–1 | 10–1–1 |
| May 11 | California | 3–1 | 29–10–1 | 11–1–1 |
| May 11 | California | 8–1 | 30–10–1 | 12–1–1 |
| May 14 | Loyola Marymount | 10–1 | 31–10–1 | – |
| May 17 | at Washington | 10–4 | 32–10–1 | 13–1–1 |
| May 18 | at Washington State | 3–9 | 32–11–1 | 13–2–1 |
| May 18 | at Washington State | 6–1 | 33–11–1 | 14–2–1 |
| May 21 | at Oregon | 11–6 | 34–11–1 | 15–2–1 |
| May 25 | at UCLA | 11–2 | 35–11–1 | 16–2–1 |

Postseason
NCAA tournament: District 8 playoffs

| Date | Opponent | Score | Overall record |
|---|---|---|---|
| May 31 | vs. Cal State Los Angeles | 4–2 | 36–11–1 |
| June 1 | vs. Cal State Los Angeles | 4–8 | 36–12–1 |
| June 1 | vs. Cal State Los Angeles | 5–4 | 37–12–1 |

NCAA tournament: College World Series

| Date | Opponent | Site/stadium | Score | Overall record |
|---|---|---|---|---|
| June 11 | vs. BYU | Rosenblatt Stadium | 5–3 | 38–12–1 |
| June 12 | vs. Oklahoma State | Rosenblatt Stadium | 6–5 | 39–12–1 |
| June 13 | vs. St. John's | Rosenblatt Stadium | 7–6 | 40–12–1 |
| June 14 | vs. North Carolina State | Rosenblatt Stadium | 2–0 | 41–12–1 |
| June 15 | vs. Southern Illinois | Rosenblatt Stadium | 4–3 | 42–12–1 |

== Awards and honors ==
Jim Barr

- All-Pac-8 Second Team

Reid Braden

- All-Pac-8 First Team

Pat Harrison

- All-America First Team
- All-Pac-8 First Team

Bill Lee

- College World Series All-Tournament Team
- All-Pac-8 Honorable Mention

Chuck Ramshaw

- All-Pac-8 Second Team

Bill Seinsoth

- College World Series Most Outstanding Player
- All-America First Team

Steve Sogge

- All-Pac-8 First Team

== Trojans in the 1968 MLB draft ==
The following members of the USC baseball program were drafted in the 1968 Major League Baseball draft.

=== June regular draft ===
| Player | Position | Round | Overall | MLB Team |
|---|---|---|---|---|
| Ron Drake | C | 18th | 419th | San Diego Padres |
| Bill Lee | LHP | 22nd | 507th | Boston Red Sox |
| James Kuehner | 1B | 25th | 561st | Washington Senators |
| William Homik | C | 66th | 908th | Los Angeles Dodgers |

=== June secondary draft ===
| Player | Position | Round | Overall | MLB Team |
|---|---|---|---|---|
| Pat Harrison | 2B | 1st | 9th | Philadelphia Phillies |
| Jim Barr | RHP | 3rd | 49th | Philadelphia Phillies |
| Reid Braden | 1B | 5th | 92nd | Philadelphia Phillies |
| William Seinsoth | 1B | 5th | 95th | Los Angeles Dodgers |

=== January secondary draft ===
| Player | Position | Round | Overall | MLB Team |
|---|---|---|---|---|
| Pat Harrison | 2B | 1st | 8th | Philadelphia Phillies |
| Dennis Parks | OF | 2nd | 30th | Chicago Cubs |
| Reid Braden | 1B | 7th | 121st | New York Mets |
