= Nomomania =

Term commonly used in baseball

Nomomania, also written as Nomo-mania, is a popular and media phenomenon surrounding Japanese former baseball pitcher, Hideo Nomo, after his move from Nippon Professional Baseball (NPB) in Japan to Major League Baseball (MLB) in the United States and his on-field success with the Los Angeles Dodgers in 1995. The term describes the intense public interest, high media attention and commercial buzz generated by Nomo's performances and persona in both the U.S. and Japan.

== Background ==
Nomo (born 1968) had been a successful professional baseball player in Japan, pitching for the Kintetsu Buffaloes when he used a contractual loophole to leave NPB and sign with the Dodgers. He debuted in MLB on May 2, 1995. Nomo employed an unusual “tornado” windup and a dominant splitter that contributed to immediate results, leading to widespread attention from fans and media in both countries.

During the 1995 season, Nomo posted a 13–6 record with a 2.54 ERA and led the National League (NL) in strikeouts (236). His string of dominant starts, selection as the NL starting pitcher in the 1995 All-Star Game, and being named NL Rookie of the Year fueled a period of extraordinary public interest — dubbed “Nomomania” — that saw higher attendance at his starts, extensive media coverage and substantial merchandise sales.

== Impact ==
Nomo's tenure in the MLB League incorporated some excellent performances that really magnified his profile in the history of baseball:

- A notable rookie campaign and the award of "NL Rookie of the Year" (1995).
- A no-hitter pitched at Coors Field on September 17, 1996, a rare feat given the venue's hitter-friendly reputation.

Nomomania had effects beyond ticket sales and headlines. Nomo's success helped change perceptions of Japanese players’ ability to compete in MLB and is widely credited -today- with encouraging teams to pursue talent from Japan, eventually contributing to formal mechanisms governing transfers between NPB and MLB. His move and the subsequent flow of Japanese players were factors in the negotiation and later establishment of the modern transfer system between Japanese NPB and American MLB in the late 1990s.

== Reception and legacy ==
Contemporaneous coverage described Nomo's arrival as a transnational cultural event. Commentators compared the public excitement to other modern mass phenomena and noted Nomo's role in revitalizing MLB interest among Japanese audiences and raising international attention to the sport. Retrospectives credit Nomo with opening a path that later allowed numerous Japanese position players and pitchers to sign with MLB clubs.

The coinage Nomomania appeared in contemporary American and British media and press and was used both informally and in long-form sports journalism to describe the phenomenon surrounding Nomo's arrival and early success in MLB. Coverage sometimes used the variant spelling “Nomomania” or “Nomo-mania”. The Dodgers previously has "Fernandomania" for star rookie Mexican pitcher Fernando Valenzuela.

== See also ==
- Hideo Nomo
- List of Japanese players in Major League Baseball
