= 1968 Oklahoma State Cowboys baseball team =

American college baseball season

1968 Oklahoma State Cowboys baseball

Big Eight champions District V champions

College World Series, T-5th
- Conference: Big Eight Conference
- Record: 21–9 (15–3 Big 8)
- Head coach: Chet Bryan (4th season)

1968 Big Eight Conference baseball standings
	Conf.				Overall
Team	W		L	PCT	W		L	PCT
No. 5 Oklahoma State ‍†‍‍^{y}	15	–	3	.833	23	–	9	.719
Kansas State ‍‍‍	13	–	7	.650	15	–	16	.484
Oklahoma ‍‍‍	10	–	8	.556	13	–	14	.481
Iowa State ‍‍‍	9	–	9	.500	11	–	16	.407
Missouri ‍‍‍	9	–	11	.450	11	–	16	.407
Colorado ‍‍‍	6	–	10	.375	9	–	13	.409
Nebraska ‍‍‍	7	–	13	.350	10	–	15	.400
Kansas ‍‍‍	5	–	13	.278	7	–	10	.412
† – Conference champion y – Invited to the NCAA tournament As of June 30, 1968; Rankings from Collegiate Baseball

The 1968 Oklahoma State Cowboys baseball team represented the Oklahoma State University in the 1968 NCAA University Division baseball season. The team was coached by Chet Bryan in his 4th year at Oklahoma State.

The Cowboys won the District V playoff to advance to the College World Series, where they were defeated by the Southern Illinois Salukis.

== Roster ==
1968 Oklahoma State Cowboys baseball team
Players
Coaches

#	Pos.	Name	B/T	Height	Weight	Year	Home town
	RHP	Mike Camp	/R	—	—	So
	LHP	Bill Dobbs	/L	—	—	Jr	Oklahoma City, Oklahoma
	C	Fred Dumler	/	—	—	So
		Murl Etter	/	—	—
		Jim Hays	/	—	—	Sr
	OF	Steve Houck	/	—	—	So
		Bob Hudspeth	/	—	—
	INF	Alan Johnson	R/	—	—
	RHP	Danny Loerwald	/R	—	—
	RHP	Bill Maxwell	/R	—	—	Jr	Tulsa, Oklahoma
	P	Bob Richardson	/	—	—
		Steve Roney	/	—	—
	P	Richard Schmidt	/	—	—	Jr
		Joe Sorenson	/	—	—
		Mike Tate	/	—	—
	INF	Danny Thompson	R/R	6 ft 0 in (1.83 m)	183 lb (83 kg)	Jr	Capron, Oklahoma
14	OF	Wayne Weatherly	/	—	—	Sr
		Rod Wisley	/	—	—

Head coach

24 Chet Bryan

Assistant coach(es)

Dean Alexander

Legend

- (C) Team captain
- (S) Suspended
- (I) Ineligible
- Injured
- Current redshirt

Roster
Last update: February 23, 2021

== Schedule ==
1968 Oklahoma State Cowboys baseball game log
Regular season
March (3–4)

#	Date	Opponent	Site/stadium	Score	Overall record	Big 8 record
1	March 23	at Texas A&M	Kyle Baseball Field • College Station, Texas	0–4	0–1	–
2	March 23	at Texas A&M	Kyle Baseball Field • College Station, Texas	2–3	0–2	–
3	March 25	at Houston	Cougar Field • Houston, Texas	5–6	0–3	–
4	March 26	at Houston	Couagr Field • Houston, Texas	2–1	1–3	–
5	March 27	at Houston	Cougar Field • Houston, Texas	9–1	2–3	–
6	March 28	at Houston	Cougar Field • Houston, Texas	6–4	3–3	–
7	March 29	at Houston	Cougar Field • Houston, Texas	3–4	3–4	–

April (7–2)

#	Date	Opponent	Site/stadium	Score	Overall record	Big 8 record
8	April 5	at Iowa State	Cap Timm Field • Ames, Iowa	9–2	4–4	1–0
9	April 5	at Iowa State	Cap Timm Field • Ames, Iowa	4–3	5–4	2–0
10	April 6	at Iowa State	Cap Timm Field • Ames, Iowa	22–4	6–4	3–0
11	April 12	Colorado	Unknown • Stillwater, Oklahoma	2–1	7–4	4–0
12	April 12	Colorado	Unknown • Stillwater, Oklahoma	3–1	8–4	5–0
13	April 13	Colorado	Unknown • Stillwater, Oklahoma	5–1	9–4	6–0
14	April 26	at Kansas State	KSU Baseball Stadium • Manhattan, Kansas	4–5	9–5	6–1
15	April 26	at Kansas State	KSU Baseball Stadium • Manhattan, Kansas	2–3	9–6	6–2
16	April 27	at Kansas State	KSU Baseball Stadium • Manhattan, Kansas	10–2	10–6	7–2

May (8–1)

#	Date	Opponent	Site/stadium	Score	Overall record	Big 8 record
17	May 3	Kansas	Unknown • Stillwater, Oklahoma	10–1	11–6	8–2
18	May 3	Kansas	Unknown • Stillwater, Oklahoma	4–5	11–7	8–3
19	May 4	Kansas	Unknown • Stillwater, Oklahoma	14–4	12–7	9–3
20	May 10	at Nebraska	Husker Diamond • Lincoln, Nebraska	5–1	13–7	10–3
21	May 10	at Nebraska	Husker Diamond • Lincoln, Nebraska	5–0	14–7	11–3
22	May 11	at Nebraska	Husker Diamond • Lincoln, Nebraska	4–0	15–7	12–3
23	May 17	at Missouri	Simmons Field • Columbia, Missouri	5–3	16–7	13–3
24	May 17	at Missouri	Simmons Field • Columbia, Missouri	10–3	17–7	14–3
25	May 18	at Missouri	Simmons Field • Columbia, Missouri	4–1	18–7	15–3

Postseason
District V (2–0)

#	Date	Opponent	Site/stadium	Score	Overall record	Big 8 record
26	May 29	Bradley	Unknown • Stillwater, Oklahoma	13–1	19–7	15–3
27	May 29	Bradley	Unknown • Stillwater, Oklahoma	2–3	20–7	15–3

College World Series (1–2)

#	Date	Opponent	Site/stadium	Score	Overall record	Big 8 record
28	June 10	vs Texas	Omaha Municipal Stadium • Omaha, Nebraska	8–5	21–7	15–3
29	June 13	vs Southern California	Omaha Municipal Stadium • Omaha, Nebraska	5–6	21–8	15–3
30	June 13	vs Southern Illinois	Omaha Municipal Stadium • Omaha, Nebraska	1–7	21–9	15–3

== Awards and honors ==
Steve Houck

- All-Big Eight Conference

Danny Thompson

- First Team All-American American Baseball Coaches Association
- All-Big Eight Conference
- College World Series All-Tournament Team

Wayne Weatherly

- All-Big Eight Conference
- College World Series All-Tournament Team
