= Mike Rogodzinski =

American baseball player (born 1948)

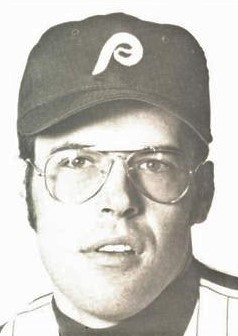
- Pinch hitter / Right fielder
- Born: February 22, 1948 (age 78); Evanston, Illinois
- Batted: Left Threw: Right

MLB debut
- May 4, 1973, for the Philadelphia Phillies

Last MLB appearance
- September 28, 1975, for the Philadelphia Phillies

MLB statistics
- Batting average: .219
- Home runs: 2
- Runs batted in: 12
- Stats at Baseball Reference

Teams
- Philadelphia Phillies (1973–1975)

Michael George Rogodzinski (born February 22, 1948) is an American former Major League Baseball (MLB) outfielder who played for the Philadelphia Phillies from 1973 to 1975.

== Biography ==
A native of Evanston, Illinois, Rogodzinski attended Evanston Township High School and Southern Illinois University, and in 1969, he played collegiate summer baseball with the Orleans Cardinals of the Cape Cod Baseball League. He was selected by the Philadelphia Phillies in the 2nd round (30th overall) of the 1969 MLB draft.
