= Bill Seinsoth =

- First baseman
- Born: April 4, 1947; Los Angeles, California, U.S.
- Died: September 7, 1969 (aged 22); Torrance, California, U.S.
- Batted: Left Threw: Left
- Stats at Baseball Reference

Career highlights and awards
- College World Series Most Outstanding Player (1968)

William R. Seinsoth (April 4, 1947 – September 7, 1969) was an American first baseman who is most notable for winning the 1968 College World Series Most Outstanding Player award while a junior at University of Southern California. He is one of seven players from University of Southern California to win that award. The others are Bill Thom, Bud Hollowell, Russ McQueen, George Milke, Rod Boxberger and Wes Rachels. Also an All-American, he hit .327 with 31 RBI in his sophomore season. The next year, he hit .312 with six home runs and 23 RBI. He hit .368 with 14 home runs and 52 RBI in 1969. He had a career .337 average in college.

Seinsoth played for the Alaska Goldpanners of the Alaska Baseball League from 1966 to 1968. He was named the Goldpanners' team MVP in 1967.

Prior to playing collegiately, Seinsoth attended Arcadia High School.

Seinsoth was drafted five times, but he played only one year professionally, never reaching the majors. He died in a traffic collision while on the way to watch the professional football debut of his college friend O. J. Simpson. He died at Harbor General Hospital in Torrance, California. One of the letters received for his funeral was from California Governor Ronald Reagan, who wrote "One thing you know more than anyone is how much better the world is because of your son passed our way.. you have every reason to be proud of him." Rod Dedeaux said, "If Bill Seinsoth had lived, there's a good chance that no one would have ever heard of Steve Garvey." Seinsoth was the subject of a 2016 book by fellow Arcadia High School graduate Steven K. Wagner titled "Seinsoth: The rough-and-Tumble Life of a Dodger" (Sunbury Press).

== Times drafted ==
(Year, Team, Round)

- 1965, Houston Astros, 15th
- 1967, Baltimore Orioles, 9th
- 1968, Los Angeles Dodgers, 5th
- 1969, Washington Senators, 4th
- 1969, Los Angeles Dodgers, 1st

== Professional baseball and family relations ==
He signed with the Dodgers for a $40,000 signing bonus.

He played for the Bakersfield Dodgers in 1969, hitting .276 with 10 home runs and 37 RBI.

His cousin was former Los Angeles Dodgers player Tommy Hutton. His father, also named Bill Seinsoth, played professionally from 1936 to 1950.
