= 1967 College Baseball All-America Team =

This is a list of college baseball players named first team All-Americans for the 1967 NCAA University Division baseball season. From 1964 to 1980, there were two generally recognized All-America selectors for baseball: the American Baseball Coaches Association and The Sporting News.

== Key ==
| A | American Baseball Coaches Association |
| S | The Sporting News |
| | Member of the National College Baseball Hall of Fame |
| | Consensus All-American – selected by both organizations |
| | Consensus All-American – selected by one organization |

== All-Americans ==
| Position | Name | School | # | A | S | Other awards and honors |
|---|---|---|---|---|---|---|
| Pitcher | Jan Dukes | Santa Clara | 1 | — | ✓ | |
| Pitcher | Gary Gentry | Arizona State | 2 | ✓ | ✓ | The Sporting News Player of the Year |
| Pitcher | Q. V. Lowe | Auburn | 1 | ✓ | — | |
| Catcher | Mike Schomaker | Stanford | 1 | — | ✓ | |
| Catcher | Tony Sellari | Oklahoma State | 1 | ✓ | — | |
| First baseman | Mark Marquess | Stanford | 2 | ✓ | ✓ | |
| Second baseman | Rusty Adkins | Clemson | 1 | ✓ | — | |
| Second baseman | Pat Harrison | USC | 1 | — | ✓ | |
| Shortstop | Frank Duffy | Stanford | 1 | — | ✓ | |
| Shortstop | Eddie Leon | Arizona | 1 | ✓ | — | |
| Third baseman | Don Denbow | SMU | 1 | — | ✓ | |
| Third baseman | Jesse Hodges | Temple | 1 | ✓ | — | |
| Outfielder | John Hetrick | Maryland | 1 | — | ✓ | |
| Outfielder | Tom Paciorek | Houston | 2 | ✓ | ✓ | |
| Outfielder | Scott Reid | Arizona State | 1 | ✓ | — | |
| Outfielder | Ray Shoup | Ohio State | 2 | ✓ | ✓ | |

== See also ==
- List of college baseball awards
