= 1967 NCAA University Division baseball rankings =

1967 NCAA University Division baseball season

Tournament

College World Series
- Champions: Arizona State
- Runners-up: Houston
- MOP: Ron Davini (Arizona State)

Seasons
- ← 1966 1968 →

The following poll makes up the 1967 NCAA University Division baseball rankings. Collegiate Baseball Newspaper published its first human poll of the top 20 teams in college baseball in 1957, and expanded to rank the top 30 teams in 1961.

== Collegiate Baseball ==
Currently, only the final poll from the 1967 season is available.

Rank	Team
1	Arizona State
2	Houston
3	Stanford
4	Auburn
5	Rider
6	Boston College
7	Ohio State
8	Oklahoma State
9	Clemson
10	Fresno State
11	Western Michigan
12	Arizona
13	Florida State
14	USC
15	Minnesota
16	Michigan
17	Texas
18	BYU
19	Florida
20	West Virginia
21	Air Force
22	Seattle
23	East Carolina
24	Notre Dame
25	UMass
26	Connecticut
27	Pittsburgh
28	Idaho
29	Denver
30	Saint Louis
