= 1967 NCAA University Division baseball tournament =

American college sports championship

- Season: 1967
- Teams: 25
- Finals site: Johnny Rosenblatt Stadium; Omaha, NE
- Champions: Arizona State (2nd title)
- Runner-up: Houston (2nd CWS Appearance)
- Winning coach: Bobby Winkles (2nd title)
- MOP: Ron Davini (Arizona State)

The 1967 NCAA University Division baseball tournament was played at the end of the 1967 NCAA University Division baseball season to determine the national champion of college baseball. The tournament concluded with eight teams competing in the College World Series, a double-elimination tournament in its twenty-first year. Eight regional districts sent representatives to the College World Series with preliminary rounds within each district serving to determine each representative. These events would later become known as regionals. Each district had its own format for selecting teams, resulting in 25 teams participating in the tournament at the conclusion of their regular season, and in some cases, after a conference tournament. The twenty-first tournament's champion was Arizona State, coached by Bobby Winkles. The Most Outstanding Player was Ron Davini of Arizona State.

== Tournament ==
The opening rounds of the tournament were played across eight district sites across the country, each consisting of between two and four teams. The winners of each District advanced to the College World Series.

Bold indicates winner.

=== District 1 at Amherst, MA ===
Semifinals
**Massachusetts**	**4**	**6**	—
Holy Cross	0	0	—
**Boston College**	**4**	8	**15**
Dartmouth	3	**9**	13

Finals
**Boston College**	**4**	5	**7**^{12}
Massachusetts	1	**6**^{11}	6

=== District 2 at Princeton, NJ ===
Upper round 1
**St. John's**	**1**
Penn State	0
**Rider**	**4**
Ithaca	1
Lower round 1
**Penn State**	**16**
Ithaca	5

Upper final
St. John's	1
**Rider**	**9**
Lower final
**St. John's**	**10**
Penn State	5

Final
**Rider**	**4**	—
St. John's	3	—

=== District 3 at Gastonia, NC ===
Upper round 1
**Florida State**	**5**
Clemson	3
**Auburn**	**8**^{12}
West Virginia	3
Lower round 1
**Clemson**	**5**
West Virginia	0

Upper final
Florida State	3
**Auburn**	**13**
Lower final
**Clemson**	**6**
Florida State	4

Final
**Auburn**	2	**6**^{13}
Clemson	**3**	5

=== District 4 at Carbondale, IL ===
Upper round 1
**Ohio State**	**3**
Valparaiso	2
**Southern Illinois**	**2**
Western Michigan	1
Lower round 1
Valparaiso	1
**Western Michigan**	**6**

Upper final
**Ohio State**	**5**
Southern Illinois	4
Lower final
**Western Michigan**	**1**^{12}
Southern Illinois	0

Final
**Ohio State**	4	**5**
Western Michigan	**5**	4

=== District 5 at Stillwater, OK ===
Finals
**Oklahoma State**	**4**	2	**1**
Cincinnati	0	**3**	0

=== District 6 at Houston, TX & Austin, TX ===
Finals
Texas	8	**5**	3
**Houston**	**11**	1	**4**

=== District 7 at Phoenix, AZ ===
Colorado Springs, CO				Phoenix, AZ
				**Arizona State**	**11**	2	**6**
**Air Force**	**5**	**10**	–	Air Force	0	**5**	0
Idaho	0	7	–

=== District 8 at Stanford, CA & Fresno, CA ===
Finals
**Stanford**	3	**6**	**6**
Fresno State	**7**	3	4

== College World Series ==
=== Participants ===
School	Conference	Record (conference)	Head coach	CWS appearances	CWS best finish	CWS record
Arizona State	WAC	48–11 (7–5)	Bobby Winkles	2 (last: 1965)	1st (1965)	6–3
Auburn	SEC	30–8 (15–2)	Paul Nix	0 (last: none)	none	0–0
Boston College	n/a	13–5–3 (n/a)	Eddie Pellagrini	3 (last: 1961)	3rd (1961)	5–6
Houston	n/a	18–9 (n/a)	Lovette Hill	1 (last: 1953)	8th (1953)	0–2
Ohio State	Big 10	25–18–3 (13–5)	Marty Karow	3 (last: 1966)	1st (1966)	9–5
Oklahoma State	Big 8	15–8 (12–3)	Chet Bryan	6 (last: 1966)	1st (1959)	18–11
Rider		30–6 (n/a)	Tom Petroff	0 (last: none)	none	0–0
Stanford	Pac-8	33–4–1 (10–1)	Dutch Fehring	1 (last: 1953)	6th (1953)	1–2

=== Results ===
==== Bracket ====
Upper round 1
Stanford	12
Houston	1
Auburn	1
Ohio State	0
Boston College	3
Rider	1
Arizona State	7
Oklahoma State	2

Upper round 2
Stanford	6
Auburn	3
Boston College	1
Arizona State	8
Lower round 1
Houston	7
Ohio State	6
Rider	3
Oklahoma State	1

Upper final
Stanford	3
Arizona State	5
Lower round 2
Boston College	2
Houston	3^{13}
Auburn	4
Rider	3

Semifinals
Arizona State	0
Houston	3
Stanford	5^{7}
Auburn	3

Preliminary final
Arizona State	4^{14}
Stanford	3

Final
Arizona State	11
Houston	2

==== Game results ====
Date	Game	Winner	Score	Loser	Notes
June 12	Game 1	Stanford	12–1	Houston	
June 12	Game 2	Auburn	1–0	Ohio State	
June 12	Game 3	Boston College	3–1	Rider	
June 12	Game 4	Arizona State	7–2	Oklahoma State	
June 13	Game 5	Houston	7–6	Ohio State	Ohio State eliminated
June 13	Game 6	Rider	3–1	Oklahoma State	Oklahoma State eliminated
June 14	Game 7	Stanford	6–3	Auburn	
June 14	Game 8	Arizona State	8–1	Boston College	
June 15	Game 9	Houston	3–2 (13)	Boston College	Boston College eliminated
June 15	Game 10	Auburn	4–3	Rider	Rider eliminated
June 15	Game 11	Arizona State	5–3	Stanford	
June 16	Game 12	Stanford	5–3 (7)	Auburn	Auburn eliminated
June 16	Game 13	Houston	3–0	Arizona State	
June 17	Game 14	Arizona State	4–3 (14)	Stanford	Stanford eliminated
June 18	Final	Arizona State	11–2	Houston	Arizona State wins CWS

=== All-Tournament Team ===
The following players were members of the All-Tournament Team.

Position	Player	School
P	Gary Gentry	Arizona State
P	Q.V. Lowe	Auburn
C	Ron Davini (MOP)	Arizona State
1B	Mark Marquess	Stanford
2B	Dick Swan	Stanford
3B	Dave Grangaard	Arizona State
SS	Jack Lind	Arizona State
OF	Ike Lucas	Houston
OF	Tom Paciorek	Houston
OF	Scott Reid	Arizona State

=== Notable players ===
- Arizona State: Randy Bobb, Gary Gentry, Larry Gura, Jack Lind, Scott Reid
- Auburn: Q.V. Lowe
- Boston College:
- Houston: Tom Paciorek
- Ohio State: Bo Rein
- Oklahoma State: Larry Burchart, Danny Thompson
- Rider:
- Stanford: Bob Boone, Frank Duffy, Bob Gallagher, Pete Hamm, Mark Marquess, Don Rose, Harvey Shank, Sandy Vance

=== Tournament Notes ===
GAME 12–Auburn vs. Stanford–The rain out.

At the bottom of the 7th inning Auburn was losing 5-3 to Stanford. Auburn had 2 men on and no outs, with hot hitting Billy Hutchins (8 for 11, and 2 home runs) at bat, when the bottom fell out of the sky and began to rain heavily. Instead of finishing the game the next day, Stanford was deemed the winner by rain out. First rain out victory in College World Series history.

== See also ==
- 1967 NAIA World Series
