= Paciorek =

Paciorek is a surname. Notable people with the surname include:

- Jaromír Paciorek (1979–2025), Czech football player
- Jim Paciorek (born 1960), American baseball player, brother of John and Tom
- John Paciorek (born 1945), American baseball player
- Tom Paciorek (born 1946), American baseball player
