= 1967 NCAA University Division baseball season =

Baseball season

NCAA tournament

College World Series
- Champions: Arizona State (2nd title)
- Runners-up: Houston (2nd CWS Appearance)
- Winning coach: Bobby Winkles (2nd title)
- MOP: Ron Davini (Arizona State)

Seasons
- ← 1966 1968 →

The 1967 NCAA University Division baseball season, play of college baseball in the United States organized by the National Collegiate Athletic Association (NCAA) began in the spring of 1967. The season progressed through the regular season and concluded with the 1967 College World Series. The College World Series, held for the twenty first time in 1967, consisted of one team from each of eight geographical districts and was held in Omaha, Nebraska at Johnny Rosenblatt Stadium as a double-elimination tournament. Arizona State claimed the championship.

== Conference winners ==
This is a partial list of conference champions from the 1967 season. Each of the eight geographical districts chose, by various methods, the team that would represent them in the NCAA tournament. 11 teams earned automatic bids by winning their conference championship while 14 teams earned at-large selections.

Conference	Regular season winner
Atlantic Coast Conference	Clemson
Big Eight Conference	Oklahoma State
Big Ten Conference	Ohio State
EIBL	Dartmouth
Mid-American Conference	Western Michigan
Pacific-8 Conference	Stanford
Southeastern Conference	Auburn
Southern Conference	East Carolina; West Virginia
Southwest Conference	Texas; TCU
Yankee Conference	UMass

== Conference standings ==
The following is an incomplete list of conference standings:

1967 Athletic Association of Western Universities baseball standings
	Conf.						Overall
Team	W		L		T	PCT	W		L		T	PCT
No. 3 Stanford ‍†‍‍^{y}	10	–	1	–	0	.909	36	–	6	–	1	.849
UCLA ‍‍‍	10	–	6	–	0	.625	43	–	19	–	0	.694
Southern California ‍‍‍	9	–	6	–	0	.600	30	–	11	–	2	.721
Oregon State ‍‍‍	9	–	6	–	0	.600	24	–	13	–	0	.649
Oregon ‍‍‍	7	–	5	–	0	.583	16	–	14	–	0	.533
Washington State ‍‍‍	7	–	6	–	0	.538	22	–	10	–	0	.688
California ‍‍‍	3	–	13	–	0	.188	17	–	27	–	0	.386
Washington ‍‍‍	1	–	13	–	0	.071	8	–	27	–	0	.229
† – Conference champion y – Invited to the NCAA tournament As of June 30, 1967; Rankings from Collegiate Baseball

1967 Big Eight Conference baseball standings
	Conf.				Overall
Team	W		L	PCT	W		L	PCT
No. 8 Oklahoma State ‍†‍‍^{y}	12	–	3	.800	15	–	10	.600
Missouri ‍‍‍	12	–	9	.571	14	–	14	.500
Oklahoma ‍‍‍	11	–	9	.550	11	–	16	.407
Kansas State ‍‍‍	9	–	8	.529	16	–	13	.552
Colorado ‍‍‍	8	–	8	.500	12	–	13	.480
Nebraska ‍‍‍	7	–	11	.389	8	–	16	.333
Kansas ‍‍‍	7	–	12	.368	12	–	15	.444
Iowa State ‍‍‍	7	–	13	.350	10	–	19	.345
† – Conference champion y – Invited to the NCAA tournament As of June 30, 1967; Rankings from Collegiate Baseball

1967 Big Ten Conference baseball standings
	Conf.						Overall
Team	W		L		T	PCT	W		L		T	PCT
No. 7 Ohio State ‍†‍‍^{y}	13	–	5	–	0	.722	25	–	20	–	3	.552
No. 16 Michigan ‍‍‍	10	–	4	–	0	.714	24	–	12	–	0	.667
No. 15 Minnesota ‍‍‍	12	–	5	–	0	.706	32	–	10	–	0	.762
Wisconsin ‍‍‍	11	–	6	–	0	.647	18	–	15	–	0	.545
Iowa ‍‍‍	8	–	9	–	0	.471	19	–	12	–	1	.609
Michigan State ‍‍‍	8	–	10	–	0	.444	22	–	23	–	1	.489
Purdue ‍‍‍	7	–	9	–	0	.438	14	–	18	–	0	.438
Indiana ‍‍‍	6	–	12	–	0	.333	14	–	23	–	0	.378
Illinois ‍‍‍	5	–	11	–	0	.313	17	–	21	–	0	.447
Northwestern ‍‍‍	4	–	13	–	0	.235	11	–	22	–	0	.333
† – Conference champion y – Invited to the College World Series; As of June 30, 1967; Rankings from Collegiate Baseball

1967 Western Athletic Conference baseball standings
	Conf.				Overall
Team	W		L	PCT	W		L	PCT
Northern
No. 18 BYU ‍‍‍	8	–	4	.667	33	–	14	.702
Wyoming ‍‍‍	5	–	5	.500	18	–	26	.409
Utah ‍‍‍	3	–	7	.300	19	–	14	.576
Southern
No. 1 Arizona State ‍‍‍^{y}	7	–	5	.583	53	–	12	.815
No. 12 Arizona ‍‍‍	7	–	5	.583	35	–	15	.700
New Mexico ‍‍‍	4	–	8	.333	25	–	19	.568
† – Conference champion y – Invited to the NCAA tournament As of June 30, 1967; Rankings from Collegiate Baseball

== College World Series ==
The 1967 season marked the twenty first NCAA baseball tournament, which culminated with the eight team College World Series. The College World Series was held in Omaha, Nebraska. The eight teams played a double-elimination format, with Arizona State claiming their second championship with an 11–2 win over Houston in the final.

Upper round 1
Stanford	12
Houston	1
Auburn	1
Ohio State	0
Boston College	3
Rider	1
Arizona State	7
Oklahoma State	2

Upper round 2
Stanford	6
Auburn	3
Boston College	1
Arizona State	8
Lower round 1
Houston	7
Ohio State	6
Rider	3
Oklahoma State	1

Upper final
Stanford	3
Arizona State	5
Lower round 2
Boston College	2
Houston	3^{13}
Auburn	4
Rider	3

Semifinals
Arizona State	0
Houston	3
Stanford	5^{7}
Auburn	3

Preliminary final
Arizona State	4^{14}
Stanford	3

Final
Arizona State	11
Houston	2
