= 1967 Stanford Indians baseball team =

American college baseball season

1967 Stanford Indians baseball

California Intercollegiate Baseball Association champions District VIII champions

College World Series, T-3rd
- Conference: Athletic Association of Western Universities
- Record: 36–6–1 (10–1 AAWU)
- Head coach: Dutch Fehring (12th season)
- Home stadium: Sunken Diamond

1967 Athletic Association of Western Universities baseball standings
	Conf.						Overall
Team	W		L		T	PCT	W		L		T	PCT
No. 3 Stanford ‍†‍‍^{y}	10	–	1	–	0	.909	36	–	6	–	1	.849
UCLA ‍‍‍	10	–	6	–	0	.625	43	–	19	–	0	.694
Southern California ‍‍‍	9	–	6	–	0	.600	30	–	11	–	2	.721
Oregon State ‍‍‍	9	–	6	–	0	.600	24	–	13	–	0	.649
Oregon ‍‍‍	7	–	5	–	0	.583	16	–	14	–	0	.533
Washington State ‍‍‍	7	–	6	–	0	.538	22	–	10	–	0	.688
California ‍‍‍	3	–	13	–	0	.188	17	–	27	–	0	.386
Washington ‍‍‍	1	–	13	–	0	.071	8	–	27	–	0	.229
† – Conference champion y – Invited to the NCAA tournament As of June 30, 1967; Rankings from Collegiate Baseball

The 1967 Stanford Indians baseball team represented Stanford University in the 1967 NCAA University Division baseball season. The Indians played their home games at Sunken Diamond. The team was coached by Dutch Fehring in his 12th year at Stanford.

The Indians won the District VIII Playoff to advance to the College World Series, where they were defeated by Arizona State.

== Roster ==
1967 Stanford Indians baseball team
Players
Coaches

#	Pos.	Name	B/T	Height	Weight	Year	Home town
	INF	Mike Ammirato	/	—	—
	INF	Bob Boone	/	—	—
	INF	Frank Duffy	/	—	—
	INF	Marty Erck	/	—	—
	C	Bob Gallagher	/	—	—
	P	Pete Hamm	/	—	—
	C	Larry Heath	/	—	—
	OF	Chuck Hoffmeister	/	—	—
	OF	Bill Holt	/	—	—
	P	Frank Klinger	/	—	—
	INF	Mark Marquess	/	—	—	So
	P	Rod Poteete	/	—	—
	P	Daro Quiring	/	—	—
	OF	Jeff Rohlfing	/	—	—
	P	Don Rose	/	—	—
	C	Mike Schomaker	/	—	—
	P	Harvey Shank	/	—	—
		Ron Shotts	/	—	—
	P	Scott Sonne	/	—	—
	INF	Dick Swan	/	—	—
	INF	Russ Tweet	/	—	—
	P	Sandy Vance	/	—	—
	P	Lou Wolcher	/	—	—

Head coach

Dutch Fehring

Assistant coach(es)

Legend

- (C) Team captain
- (S) Suspended
- (I) Ineligible
- Injured
- Current redshirt

Roster
Last update: December 25, 2020

== Schedule ==
1967 Stanford Indians baseball game log
Regular season
February (1–0)

#	Date	Opponent	Site/stadium	Score	Overall record	AAWU record
1	February	Saint Mary's	Unknown • Unknown	8–0	1–0	–

March (9–1)

#	Date	Opponent	Site/stadium	Score	Overall record	AAWU record
2	March	Chico State	Unknown • Unknown	7–0	2–0	–
3	March	Sacramento State	Unknown • Unknown	6–3	3–0	–
4	March	San Francisco	Unknown • Unknown	3–0	4–0	–
5	March	Santa Clara	Unknown • Unknown	7–2	5–0	–
6	March	Cal Poly Pomona	Unknown • Unknown	13–3	6–0	–
7	March	Cal Poly Pomona	Unknown • Unknown	1–2	6–1	–
8	March	Cal Poly	Unknown • Unknown	5–3	7–1	–
9	March	San Diego Marines	Unknown • Unknown	17–0	8–1	–
10	March	San Diego Marines	Unknown • Unknown	1–0	9–1	–
11	March 29	at San Diego State	Unknown • San Diego, California	1–0	10–1	–

April (9–1–1)

#	Date	Opponent	Site/stadium	Score	Overall record	AAWU record
12	April 8	Air Force	Sunken Diamond • Stanford, California	7–3	11–1	–
13	April 8	Air Force	Sunken Diamond • Stanford, California	7–3	12–1	–
14	April	Cal State Hayward	Unknown • Unknown	2–1	13–1	–
15	April	Oregon State	Sunken Diamond • Stanford, California	4–1	14–1	1–0
16	April	Oregon State	Sunken Diamond • Stanford, California	2–1	15–1	2–0
17	April 22	Southern California	Bovard Field • Los Angeles, California	4–1	16–1	3–0
18	April 22	Southern California	Bovard Field • Los Angeles, California	2–6	16–2	3–1
19	April	at San Jose State	San Jose Municipal Stadium • San Jose, California	8–0	17–2	3–1
20	April 28	Southern California	Sunken Diamond • Stanford, California	3–3	17–2–1	3–1–1
21	April 29	UCLA	Sunken Diamond • Stanford, California	8–3	18–2–1	4–1–1
22	April 29	UCLA	Sunken Diamond • Stanford, California	9–2	19–2–1	5–1–1

May (0–0)

#	Date	Opponent	Site/stadium	Score	Overall record	AAWU record
23	May 2	San Jose State	Sunken Diamond • Stanford, California	6–1	20–2–1	5–1–1
24	May	San Diego Marines	Unknown • Unknown	6–5	21–2–1	5–1–1
25	May	San Francisco	Unknown • Unknown	4–5	21–3–1	5–1–1
26	May	California	Unknown • Unknown	10–2	22–3–1	6–1–1
27	May	San Francisco State	Unknown • Unknown	17–8	23–3–1	6–1–1
28	May	at Washington	Old Graves Field • Seattle, Washington	7–0	24–3–1	7–1–1
29	May	at Washington	Old Graves Field • Seattle, Washington	3–1	25–3–1	8–1–1
30	May	San Francisco State	Unknown • Unknown	11–5	26–3–1	8–1–1
31	May	California	Unknown • Unknown	5–1	27–3–1	9–1–1
32	May	California	Unknown • Unknown	6–3	28–3–1	10–1–1

Postseason
District VIII Playoff (2–1)

#	Date	Opponent	Site/stadium	Score	Overall record	AAWU record
36	May	Fresno State	Sunken Diamond • Stanford, California	3–7	31–4–1	10–1–1
37	May	at Fresno State	Varsity Park • Fresno, California	6–3	32–4–1	10–1–1
38	May	at Fresno State	Varsity Park • Fresno, California	6–4	33–4–1	10–1–1

College World Series (3–2)

#	Date	Opponent	Site/stadium	Score	Overall record	AAWU record
39	June 12	vs Houston	Johnny Rosenblatt Stadium • Omaha, Nebraska	12–1	34–4–1	10–1–1
40	June 14	vs Auburn	Johnny Rosenblatt Stadium • Omaha, Nebraska	6–3	35–4–1	10–1–1
41	June 15	vs Arizona State	Johnny Rosenblatt Stadium • Omaha, Nebraska	3–5	35–5–1	10–1–1
42	June 16	vs Auburn	Johnny Rosenblatt Stadium • Omaha, Nebraska	5–3	36–5–1	10–1–1
43	June 17	vs Arizona State	Johnny Rosenblatt Stadium • Omaha, Nebraska	3–4	36–6–1	10–1–1

== Awards and honors ==
Frank Duffy

- First Team All-AAWU
- Second Team All-American American Baseball Coaches Association
- First Team All-American The Sporting News

Mark Marquess

- First Team All-AAWU
- First Team All-American American Baseball Coaches Association
- First Team All-American The Sporting News

Mike Schomaker

- First Team All-AAWU
- Second Team All-American American Baseball Coaches Association

Sandy Vance

- First Team All-AAWU
