= 2011 Southern League season =

- League: Southern League
- Sport: Baseball
- Duration: April 7 – September 5
- Number of games: 140
- Number of teams: 10

Regular season
- League champions: Mobile BayBears
- Season MVP: Paul Goldschmidt, Mobile BayBears

Playoffs
- League champions: Mobile BayBears
- Runners-up: Tennessee Smokies

SL seasons
- ← 2010 2012 →

The 2011 Southern League was a Class AA baseball season played between April 7 and September 5. Ten teams played a 140-game schedule, with the top team in each division in each half of the season qualifying for the post-season.

The Mobile BayBears won the Southern League championship, defeating the Tennessee Smokies in the playoffs.

== Team changes ==
- The West Tenn Diamond Jaxx are renamed to the Jackson Generals. The club remained affiliated with the Seattle Mariners.

== Teams ==
2011 Southern League
Division	Team	City	MLB Affiliate	Stadium
North	Carolina Mudcats	Zebulon, North Carolina	Cincinnati Reds	Five County Stadium
North	Chattanooga Lookouts	Chattanooga, Tennessee	Los Angeles Dodgers	AT&T Field
North	Huntsville Stars	Huntsville, Alabama	Milwaukee Brewers	Joe W. Davis Stadium
North	Jackson Generals	Jackson, Tennessee	Seattle Mariners	Pringles Park
North	Tennessee Smokies	Sevierville, Tennessee	Chicago Cubs	Smokies Park
South	Birmingham Barons	Birmingham, Alabama	Chicago White Sox	Regions Park
South	Jacksonville Suns	Jacksonville, Florida	Florida Marlins	Baseball Grounds of Jacksonville
South	Mississippi Braves	Jackson, Mississippi	Atlanta Braves	Trustmark Park
South	Mobile BayBears	Mobile, Alabama	Arizona Diamondbacks	Hank Aaron Stadium
South	Montgomery Biscuits	Montgomery, Alabama	Tampa Bay Rays	Montgomery Riverwalk Stadium

== Map of teams ==
North Division South Division

== Regular season ==
=== Summary ===
- The Mobile BayBears finished the season with the best record in the league for the first time since 1998.

=== Standings ===
North Division
Team	Win	Loss	%	GB
Tennessee Smokies	83	57	.593	–
Chattanooga Lookouts	77	62	.554	5.5
Jackson Generals	68	72	.486	15
Huntsville Stars	64	73	.467	17.5
Carolina Mudcats	53	86	.381	29.5
South Division
Mobile BayBears	84	54	.609	–
Birmingham Barons	71	69	.507	14
Jacksonville Suns	70	70	.500	15
Montgomery Biscuits	65	74	.468	19.5
Mississippi Braves	61	79	.436	24

== League Leaders ==
=== Batting leaders ===
Stat	Player	Total
AVG	Scott Van Slyke, Chattanooga Lookouts	.348
H	AJ Pollock, Mobile BayBears	169
R	AJ Pollock, Mobile BayBears	103
2B	Scott Van Slyke, Chattanooga Lookouts	45
3B	Alfredo Silverio, Chattanooga Lookouts	18
HR	Paul Goldschmidt, Mobile BayBears; Neftali Soto, Carolina Mudcats	30
RBI	Ernesto Mejía, Mississippi Braves	99
SB	Quintin Berry, Carolina Mudcats	40

=== Pitching leaders ===
Stat	Player	Total
W	Will Savage, Chattanooga Lookouts	12
ERA	Matt Moore, Montgomery Biscuits	2.20
CG	Charles Brewer, Mobile BayBears; Randall Delgado, Mississippi Braves; Terry Doyle, Birmingham Barons; Matt Klinker, Carolina Mudcats	2
SHO	Andrew Carraway, Jackson Generals; Alex Colomé, Montgomery Biscuits; Patrick Corbin, Mobile BayBears; Terry Doyle, Birmingham Barons; Matt Moore, Montgomery Biscuits; Nick Struck, Tennessee Smokies; Allen Webster, Chattanooga Lookouts	1
SV	Sandy Rosario, Jacksonville Suns	23
IP	Patrick Corbin, Mobile BayBears	160.1
SO	Patrick Corbin, Mobile BayBears	142

== Playoffs ==
- The Mobile BayBears won their third Southern League championship, defeating the Tennessee Smokies in four games.

=== Playoff bracket ===
Division finals
N1	Tennessee	3
N2	Chattanooga	0
S1	Mobile	3
S2	Birmingham	2

Finals
N1	Tennessee	1
S1	Mobile	3

== Awards ==
Southern League awards
Award name	Recipient
Most Valuable Player	Paul Goldschmidt, Mobile BayBears
Pitcher of the Year	Wily Peralta, Huntsville Stars
Manager of the Year	Turner Ward, Mobile BayBears

== See also ==
- 2011 Major League Baseball season
