= 1967 Oklahoma State Cowboys baseball team =

American college baseball season

1967 Oklahoma State Cowboys baseball

Big Eight champions District V champions

College World Series, T-7th
- Conference: Big Eight Conference
- CB: No. 4
- Record: 15–10 (12–3 Big 8)
- Head coach: Chet Bryan (3rd season)

1967 Big Eight Conference baseball standings
	Conf.				Overall
Team	W		L	PCT	W		L	PCT
No. 8 Oklahoma State ‍†‍‍^{y}	12	–	3	.800	15	–	10	.600
Missouri ‍‍‍	12	–	9	.571	14	–	14	.500
Oklahoma ‍‍‍	11	–	9	.550	11	–	16	.407
Kansas State ‍‍‍	9	–	8	.529	16	–	13	.552
Colorado ‍‍‍	8	–	8	.500	12	–	13	.480
Nebraska ‍‍‍	7	–	11	.389	8	–	16	.333
Kansas ‍‍‍	7	–	12	.368	12	–	15	.444
Iowa State ‍‍‍	7	–	13	.350	10	–	19	.345
† – Conference champion y – Invited to the NCAA tournament As of June 30, 1967; Rankings from Collegiate Baseball

The 1967 Oklahoma State Cowboys baseball team represented the Oklahoma State University in the 1967 NCAA University Division baseball season. The team was coached by Chet Bryan in his 3rd year at Oklahoma State.

The Cowboys won the District V playoff to advance to the College World Series, where they were defeated by the Rider Broncs.

== Roster ==
1967 Oklahoma State Cowboys baseball team
Players
Coaches

#	Pos.	Name	B/T	Height	Weight	Year	Home town
		Larry Bickford	/	—	—
	RHP	Larry Burchart	R/R	6 ft 3 in (1.91 m)	205 lb (93 kg)	Jr	Midwest City, Oklahoma
	LHP	Bill Dobbs	/L	—	—	So	Oklahoma City, Oklahoma
		Marv Fiocchi	/	—	—
		Richar Frank	/	—	—
		Jim Hays	/	—	—
		Alan Johnson	/	—	—
		George Keeley	/	—	—
	OF	Don Kuykendall	/	—	—
	RHP	Bill Maxwell	/R	—	—	So	Tulsa, Oklahoma
		Ron McCord	/	—	—
	P	Richard Schmidt	/	—	—	So
21	C	Tony Sellari	/	—	—
		Joe Sorenson	/	—	—
		Mike Tate	/	—	—
	INF	Danny Thompson	R/R	6 ft 0 in (1.83 m)	183 lb (83 kg)	So	Capron, Oklahoma
	OF	Wayne Weatherly	/	—	—	Jr

Head coach

24 Chet Bryan

Assistant coach(es)

Legend

- (C) Team captain
- (S) Suspended
- (I) Ineligible
- Injured
- Current redshirt

Roster
Last update: February 13, 2021

== Schedule ==
1967 Oklahoma State Cowboys baseball game log
Regular season
March (1–4)

#	Date	Opponent	Site/stadium	Score	Overall record	Big 8 record
1	March 27	at Houston	Buffalo Stadium • Houston, Texas	4–5	0–1	–
2	March 28	at Houston	Buffalo Stadium • Houston, Texas	6–5	1–1	–
3	March 29	at Rice	Rice Baseball Field • Houston, Texas	0–7	1–2	–
4	March 30	at Houston Baptist	Unknown • Houston, Texas	0–18	1–3	–
5	March 31	at Houston	Buffalo Stadium • Houston, Texas	1–4	1–4	–

April (10–2)

#	Date	Opponent	Site/stadium	Score	Overall record	Big 8 record
6	April 7	Missouri	Unknown • Stillwater, Oklahoma	5–6	1–5	0–1
7	April 7	Missouri	Unknown • Stillwater, Oklahoma	8–6	2–5	1–1
8	April 8	Missouri	Unknown • Stillwater, Oklahoma	8–7	3–5	2–1
9	April 14	at Kansas	Hoglund Ballpark • Lawrence, Kansas	3–1	4–5	3–1
10	April 14	at Kansas	Hoglund Ballpark • Lawrence, Kansas	3–1	5–5	4–1
11	April 15	at Kansas	FHoglund Ballpark • Lawrence, Kansas	1–0	6–5	5–1
12	April 21	Nebraska	Unknown • Stillwater, Oklahoma	3–1	7–5	6–1
13	April 21	Nebraska	Unknown • Stillwater, Oklahoma	4–1	8–5	7–1
14	April 22	Nebraska	Unknown • Stillwater, Oklahoma	3–0	9–5	8–1
15	April 28	at Oklahoma	Unknown • Norman, Oklahoma	4–2	10–5	9–1
16	April 28	at Oklahoma	Unknown • Norman, Oklahoma	1–0	11–5	10–1
17	April 29	at Oklahoma	Unknown • Norman, Oklahoma	2–3	11–6	10–2

May (2–1)

#	Date	Opponent	Site/stadium	Score	Overall record	Big 8 record
18	May 12	at Colorado	Unknown • Boulder, Colorado	1–2	11–7	10–3
19	May 19	Iowa State	Unknown • Stillwater, Oklahoma	8–0	12–7	11–3
20	May 19	Iowa State	Unknown • Stillwater, Oklahoma	2–0	13–7	12–3

Postseason
District V (2–1)

#	Date	Opponent	Site/stadium	Score	Overall record	Big 8 record
21	May 29	Cincinnati	Unknown • Stillwater, Oklahoma	4–0	14–7	12–3
22	May 29	Cincinnati	Unknown • Stillwater, Oklahoma	2–3	14–8	12–3
23	May 31	Cincinnati	Unknown • Stillwater, Oklahoma	1–0	15–8	12–3

College World Series (0–2)

#	Date	Opponent	Site/stadium	Score	Overall record	Big 8 record
24	June 12	vs Arizona State	Omaha Municipal Stadium • Omaha, Nebraska	2–7	15–9	12–3
25	June 13	vs Rider	Omaha Municipal Stadium • Omaha, Nebraska	1–3	15–10	12–3

== Awards and honors ==
Larry Burchart

- All-Big Eight Conference

Tony Sellari

- First Team All-American American Baseball Coaches Association
- All-Big Eight Conference

Danny Thompson

- All-Big Eight Conference
