= Hunter Morris =

American baseball coach and player

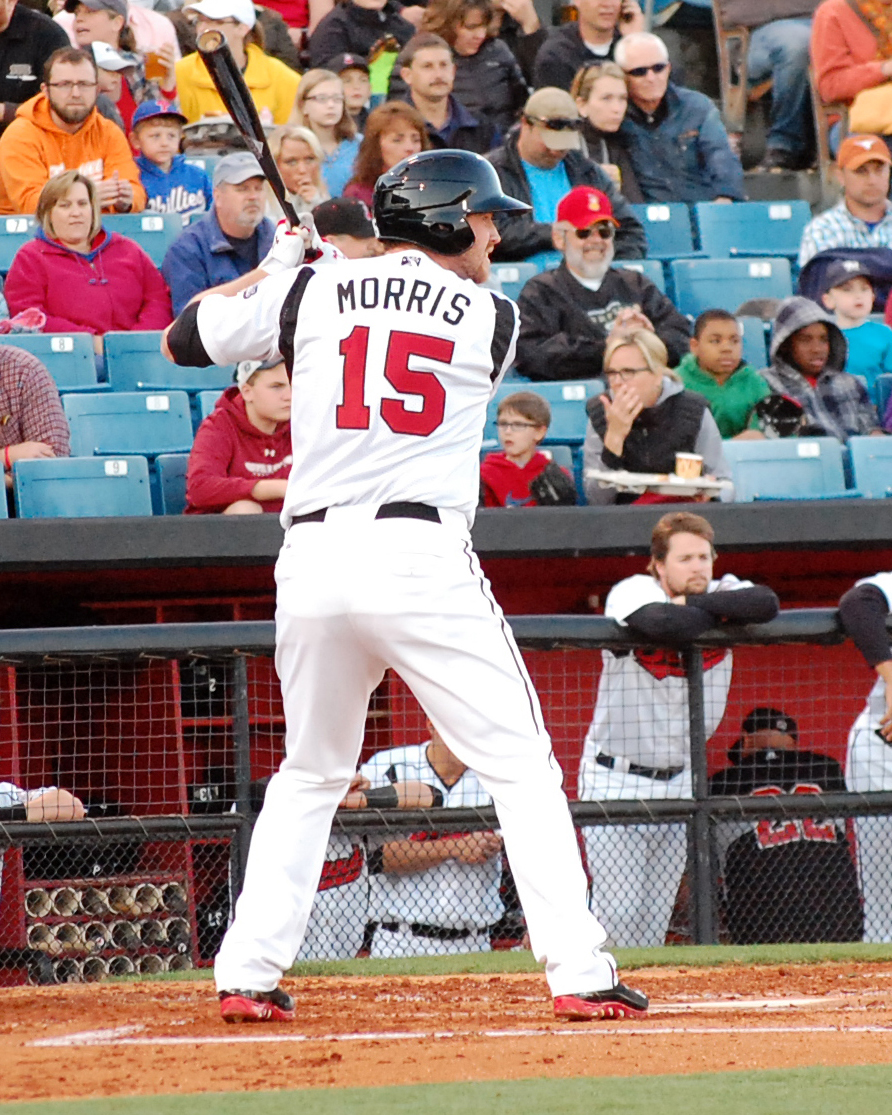
- Morris playing for the Nashville Sounds in 2013

Current position
- Title: Volunteer Assistant Coach
- Team: University of Alabama
- Conference: SEC

Biographical details
- Born: October 7, 1988 (age 38); Huntsville, Alabama, U.S.

Playing career
- 2008–2010: Auburn
- 2010: Wisconsin Timber Rattlers
- 2011: Brevard County Manatees
- 2011–2012: Huntsville Stars
- 2013–2014: Nashville Sounds
- 2014: Arizona League Brewers
- 2014: Huntsville Stars
- 2015: Indianapolis Indians
- 2015: Altoona Curve
- Position: First baseman

Coaching career (HC unless noted)
- 2017: Auburn (GA)
- 2018–2020: UT Martin (H/RC)
- 2021–present: Alabama (Volunteer assistant)
Medal record
Men's baseball
Representing United States
World Junior Baseball Championship
Silver medal – second place	2006 Sancti Spíritus	Team

Jeffrey Hunter Morris (born October 7, 1988) is an American college baseball coach and former professional baseball first baseman. He is a volunteer assistant coach at the University of Alabama. Morris played college baseball at Auburn University from 2008 to 2010 for head coach John Pawlowski before pursuing a professional baseball career.

== College career ==
Morris at Auburn in 2010

Morris was drafted by the Boston Red Sox in the second round of the 2007 Major League Baseball draft out of Virgil I. Grissom High School in Huntsville, Alabama but did not sign and attended Auburn University. In 2009, he played collegiate summer baseball for the Falmouth Commodores of the Cape Cod Baseball League (CCBL), and participated in the league's All-Star Home Run Hitting contest. In 2010 Morris was the SEC Player of the Year and a first team All-American by Baseball America and the National Collegiate Baseball Writers Association.

== Professional career ==
=== Milwaukee Brewers ===
Morris was drafted by the Milwaukee Brewers in the fourth round of the 2010 Major League Baseball draft.

In 2012, Morris was the Southern League Most Valuable Player after hitting .303/.357/.563 with 28 home runs and 113 runs batted in. He also won the Robin Yount Performance Award as the Brewers Minor League Player of the Year.

Morris was added to the Brewers 40-man roster on November 20, 2013. He was designated for assignment on January 19, 2015, without ever having appeared in a game for the Brewers.

=== Pittsburgh Pirates ===
On April 2, 2015, Morris was acquired by the Pittsburgh Pirates for a player to be named later.

== Coaching career ==
On June 13, 2016, Morris became the student assistant hitting coach for Auburn. In 2017, he returned to the CCBL's Falmouth Commodores as an assistant coach.

Morris held the role of hitting coach at the University of Tennessee at Martin from 2017 to 2020. In 2021, Morris left the program to pursue another coaching opportunity.

On July 21, 2021, Morris joined the University of Alabama coaching staff as a Volunteer Assistant Coach.
