= 1967 Boston College Eagles baseball team =

American college baseball season

1967 Boston College Eagles baseball

Greater Boston League champions District I champions

College World Series, T-5th
- Conference: Independent
- CB: No. 6
- Record: 14–7–3
- Head coach: Eddie Pellagrini (10th season)
- Captain: Bill Kitley
- Home stadium: Cleveland Circle Field

The 1967 Boston College Eagles baseball team represented Boston College in the 1967 NCAA University Division baseball season. The Eagles played their home games at Cleveland Circle Field. The team was coached by Eddie Pellagrini in his 10th year at Boston College.

The Eagles won the District I Playoff to advanced to the College World Series, where they were defeated by the Houston Cougars.

The team typically played at John Shea Field, but with the diamond sinking over the course of time, they were forced to play at Cleveland Circle Field.

== Roster ==
1967 Boston College Eagles baseball team
Players
Coaches

#	Pos.	Name	B/T	Height	Weight	Year	Home town
	OF	Mick Amick	/	—	—
	P	Vin Campobasso	/	—	—
	P	Bob Conley	/	—	—
	P	Dennis Connelly	/	—	—	Sr
	RHP	Jim Curley	/	—	—
	OF	Mike Finnell	/	—	—	Jr
	LHP	Pete Ford	/L	—	—	Jr
	C	Marty Joyce	/	—	—	Jr
	INF	Bill Kitley (C)	L/L	—	—	Sr
	C	Larry Marino	/	—	—	Jr
	LHP	Ed McCarty	/	—	—
	RHP	Bill O'Brien	/R	—	—	Sr
	INF	Ed O'Neill	S/R	—	—	Jr
	INF	Bill Plunkert	/R	—	—	Jr
	P	Mark Pooper	/	—	—	Sr
	INF	Mike Robertson	/R	—	—	So
	OF	John Salmon	/	—	—	So

Head coach

Eddie Pellagrini

Assistant coach(es)

Legend

- (C) Team captain
- (S) Suspended
- (I) Ineligible
- Injured
- Current redshirt

Roster
Last update: December 10, 2020

== Schedule ==
1967 Boston College Eagles baseball game log
Regular season
April (5–1–1)

#	Date	Opponent	Site/stadium	Score	Overall record	GBL record
1	April 4	vs MIT	Unknown • Cambridge, Massachusetts	17–0	1–0	1–0
2	April 11	Rhode Island	Cleveland Circle Field • Boston, Massachusetts	2–2	1–0–1	1–0
3	April	Brandeis	Cleveland Circle Field • Boston, Massachusetts	2–1	2–0–1	2–0
4	April 21	at Tufts	Unknown • Medford, Massachusetts	6–0	3–0–1	3–0
5	April 24	at Northeastern	Parsons Field • Brookline, Massachusetts	3–6	3–1–1	3–1
6	April 26	Boston University	Cleveland Circle Field • Boston, Massachusetts	9–1	4–1–1	4–1
7	April 27	Tufts	Cleveland Circle Field • Boston, Massachusetts	8–3	5–1–1	5–1

May (3–2–1)

#	Date	Opponent	Site/stadium	Score	Overall record	GBL record
8	May 1	at Boston University	Unknown • Boston, Massachusetts	3–3	5–1–2	5–1–1
9	May	vs Massachusetts	Unknown • Unknown	6–1	6–1–2	5–1–1
10	May 3	at Dartmouth	Red Rolfe Field • Hanover, New Hampshire	8–9	6–2–2	5–1–1
11	May 6	Harvard	Cleveland Circle Field • Boston, Massachusetts	3–5	6–3–2	5–2–1
12	May	Providence	Unknown • Unknown	0–0	6–3–3	5–2–1
13	May 11	Northeastern	Cleveland Circle Field • Boston, Massachusetts	7–4	7–3–3	6–2–1
14	May	Colby	Unknown • Unknown	6–5	8–3–3	6–2–1

Postseason
District I Playoff (4–2)

#	Date	Opponent	Site/stadium	Score	Overall record	GBL record
15	May 28	vs Dartmouth	Unknown • Amherst, Massachusetts	4–3	9–3–3	6–2–1
16	May 28	vs Dartmouth	Unknown • Amherst, Massachusetts	8–9	9–4–3	6–2–1
17	May 29	vs Dartmouth	Unknown • Amherst, Massachusetts	15–13	10–4–3	6–2–1
18	June 2	at Massachusetts	Unknown • Amherst, Massachusetts	4–1	11–4–3	6–2–1
19	June 2	at Massachusetts	Unknown • Amherst, Massachusetts	5–6	11–5–3	6–2–1
20	June 3	at Massachusetts	Unknown • Amherst, Massachusetts	7–6	12–5–3	6–2–1

June (1–0)

#	Date	Opponent	Site/stadium	Score	Overall record	GBL record
21	June 1	Holy Cross	Unknown • Unknown	2–1	13–5–3	6–2–1

College World Series (1–2)

#	Date	Opponent	Site/stadium	Score	Overall record	GBL record
22	June 12	vs Rider	Omaha Municipal Stadium • Omaha, Nebraska	3–1	14–5–3	6–2–1
23	June 14	vs Arizona State	Omaha Municipal Stadium • Omaha, Nebraska	1–8	14–6–3	6–2–1
24	June 15	vs Houston	Omaha Municipal Stadium • Omaha, Nebraska	2–3	14–7–3	6–2–1
