= 1967 Arizona State Sun Devils baseball team =

American college baseball season

1967 Arizona State Sun Devils baseball

National champions WAC champions
- Conference: Western Athletic Conference
- CB: No. 1
- Record: 53–12 (7–5 WAC)
- Head coach: Bobby Winkles (9th year)
- Assistant coach: Jack Smitheran

1967 Western Athletic Conference baseball standings
	Conf.				Overall
Team	W		L	PCT	W		L	PCT
Northern
No. 18 BYU ‍‍‍	8	–	4	.667	33	–	14	.702
Wyoming ‍‍‍	5	–	5	.500	18	–	26	.409
Utah ‍‍‍	3	–	7	.300	19	–	14	.576
Southern
No. 1 Arizona State ‍‍‍^{y}	7	–	5	.583	53	–	12	.815
No. 12 Arizona ‍‍‍	7	–	5	.583	35	–	15	.700
New Mexico ‍‍‍	4	–	8	.333	25	–	19	.568
† – Conference champion y – Invited to the NCAA tournament As of June 30, 1967; Rankings from Collegiate Baseball

The 1967 Arizona State Sun Devils baseball team represented Arizona State University in the 1967 NCAA University Division baseball season. The team was coached by Bobby Winkles in his 9th season at Arizona State.

The Sun Devils won the College World Series, defeating the Houston Cougars in the championship game.

== Roster ==
1967 Arizona State Sun Devils roster
Pitchers: 8 Gary Gentry; 10 Sam chipps; 11 Tom Burgess; 14 Larry Gura; 21 Doug Nurnberg; 24 Jeff Pentland; 27 Richard Kwasny	Infielders: 2 Fred Nelson; 3 Marc Musser; 4 Jack Lind; 5 Dave Grangaard; 6 Kent Perry; 18 Roger Detter; 22 Bernie Vitek; 23 Joe Paulson	Outfielders: 7 Scott Reid; 9 Ralph Carpenter; 15 Bill Massarand; 16 Larry Linville; 17 Wayne Rice; Catchers: 12 Randy Bobb; 19 Ron Davini; 24 Phil Herzog

== Schedule ==
1967 Arizona State Sun Devils baseball game log
Regular season
February/March

Date	Opponent	Score	Overall record	WAC record
February 24	San Fernando State	14–0	1–0	–
February 25	San Fernando State	8–5	2–0	–
February 25	San Fernando State	7–4	3–0	–
March 2	Cal State LA	11–5	4–0	–
March 3	Cal State LA	8–4	5–0	–
March 4	Cal State LA	8–2	6–0	–
March 4	Cal State LA	8–4	7–0	–
March 9	UCLA	2–1	8–0	–
March 10	Long Beach State	12–4	9–0	–
March 11	Long Beach State	7–6	10–0	–
March 11	Long Beach State	4–5	10–1	–
March 17	Colorado State	3–0	11–1	–
March 17	Santa Clara	4–1	12–1	–
March 18	Colorado State	11–0	13–1	–
March 20	Oregon State	1–5	13–2	–
March 21	Oregon State	5–7	13–3	–
March 22	Oregon State	7–3	14–3	–
March 23	Colorado State	10–9	15–3	–
March 24	Colorado	16–3	16–3	–
March 25	Colorado	15–2	17–3	–
March 27	Oklahoma	3–2	18–3	–
March 28	Oklahoma	1–0	19–3	–
March 30	Oklahoma	9–2	20–3	–
March 31	Oklahoma	13–2	21–3	–

April

Date	Opponent	Score	Overall record	WAC record
April 3	Utah State	5–4	22–3	–
April 4	Utah State	20–6	23–3	–
April 5	Utah State	12–1	24–3	–
April 6	Wyoming	12–3	25–3	–
April 7	Wyoming	5–1	26–3	–
April 8	Wyoming	1–0	27–3	–
April 8	Wyoming	4–0	28–3	–
April 12	Grand Canyon	5–4	29–3	–
April 14	at Arizona	0–6	29–4	0–1
April 15	at Arizona	2–3	29–5	0–2
April 15	at Arizona	3–0	30–5	1–2
April 21	California Western	3–13	30–6	–
April 22	California Western	6–5	31–6	–
April 22	California Western	6–5	32–6	–
April 26	at Grand Canyon	4–2	33–6	–
April 28	at New Mexico	2–5	33–7	1–3
April 29	at New Mexico	13–17	33–8	1–4
April 29	at New Mexico	9–2	34–8	2–4

May

Date	Opponent	Score	Overall record	WAC record
May 5	San Diego	10–0	35–8	–
May 6	San Diego	1–0	36–8	–
May 6	San Diego	11–1	37–8	–
May 9	Grand Canyon	6–2	38–8	–
May 12	New Mexico	7–2	39–8	3–4
May 13	New Mexico	3–2	40–8	4–4
May 13	New Mexico	8–3	41–8	5–4
May 19	Arizona	3–0	42–8	6–4
May 20	Arizona	3–0	43–8	7–4
May 20	Arizona	2–7	43–9	7–5

Postseason
WAC Southern Division Playoff

Date	Opponent	Score	Overall record
May 21	vs. Arizona	3–2	44–9

WAC Championship

Date	Opponent	Score	Overall record
May 26	vs. BYU	0–3	44–10
May 27	vs. BYU	6–3	45–10
May 28	vs. BYU	4–3	46–10

NCAA tournament: District 7 playoffs

Date	Opponent	Score	Overall record
June 2	vs. Air Force	11–0	47–10
June 3	vs. Air Force	2–5	47–11
June 3	vs. Air Force	6–0	48–11

NCAA tournament: College World Series

Date	Opponent	Site/stadium	Score	Overall record
June 12	vs. Oklahoma State	Rosenblatt Stadium	7–2	49–11
June 13	vs. Boston College	Rosenblatt Stadium	8–1	50–11
June 14	vs. Stanford	Rosenblatt Stadium	5–3	51–11
June 16	vs. Houston	Rosenblatt Stadium	0–3	51–12
June 17	vs. Stanford	Rosenblatt Stadium	4–3	52–12
June 18	vs. Houston	Rosenblatt Stadium	11–2	53–12

== Awards and honors ==
Randy Bobb

- First Team All-WAC

Ron Davini

- College World Series Most Outstanding Player
- First Team All-WAC

Gary Gentry

- College World Series All-Tournament Team
- The Sporting News Player of the Year
- First Team All-American
- First Team All-WAC
- Dave Grangaard
- College World Series All-Tournament Team

Jack Lind

- College World Series All-Tournament Team

Scott Reid

- College World Series All-Tournament Team
- First Team All-American
- First Team All-WAC
