= 2010 Southern League season =

- League: Southern League
- Sport: Baseball
- Duration: April 8 – September 6
- Number of games: 140
- Number of teams: 10

Regular season
- League champions: Tennessee Smokies
- Season MVP: Dave Sappelt, Carolina Mudcats

Playoffs
- League champions: Jacksonville Suns
- Runners-up: Tennessee Smokies

SL seasons
- ← 2009 2011 →

The 2010 Southern League was a Class AA baseball season played between April 8 and September 6. Ten teams played a 140-game schedule, with the top team in each division in each half of the season qualifying for the post-season.

The Jacksonville Suns won the Southern League championship, defeating the Tennessee Smokies in the playoffs.

== Teams ==
2010 Southern League
Division	Team	City	MLB Affiliate	Stadium
North	Carolina Mudcats	Zebulon, North Carolina	Cincinnati Reds	Five County Stadium
North	Chattanooga Lookouts	Chattanooga, Tennessee	Los Angeles Dodgers	AT&T Field
North	Huntsville Stars	Huntsville, Alabama	Milwaukee Brewers	Joe W. Davis Stadium
North	Tennessee Smokies	Sevierville, Tennessee	Chicago Cubs	Smokies Park
North	West Tenn Diamond Jaxx	Jackson, Tennessee	Seattle Mariners	Pringles Park
South	Birmingham Barons	Birmingham, Alabama	Chicago White Sox	Regions Park
South	Jacksonville Suns	Jacksonville, Florida	Florida Marlins	Baseball Grounds of Jacksonville
South	Mississippi Braves	Jackson, Mississippi	Atlanta Braves	Trustmark Park
South	Mobile BayBears	Mobile, Alabama	Arizona Diamondbacks	Hank Aaron Stadium
South	Montgomery Biscuits	Montgomery, Alabama	Tampa Bay Rays	Montgomery Riverwalk Stadium

== Map of teams ==
North Division South Division

== Regular season ==
=== Summary ===
- The Tennessee Smokies finished the season with the best record in the league for the first time since 1985.

=== Standings ===
North Division
Team	Win	Loss	%	GB
Tennessee Smokies	86	53	.619	–
West Tenn Diamond Jaxx	73	66	.525	13
Huntsville Stars	67	73	.479	19.5
Chattanooga Lookouts	65	74	.468	21
Carolina Mudcats	58	79	.423	27
South Division
Jacksonville Suns	81	59	.579	–
Mobile BayBears	75	62	.547	4.5
Montgomery Biscuits	72	66	.522	8
Mississippi Braves	63	74	.460	16.5
Birmingham Barons	53	87	.379	28

== League Leaders ==
=== Batting leaders ===
Stat	Player	Total
AVG	Dave Sappelt, Carolina Mudcats	.361
H	Brett Lawrie, Huntsville Stars	158
R	Brett Lawrie, Huntsville Stars; Ozzie Martínez, Jacksonville Suns	90
2B	Mauro Gómez, Mississippi Braves	42
3B	Brett Lawrie, Huntsville Stars	16
HR	Carlos Peguero, West Tenn Diamond Jaxx	23
RBI	Alex Liddi, West Tenn Diamond Jaxx	92
SB	Dee Strange-Gordon, Chattanooga Lookouts	53

=== Pitching leaders ===
Stat	Player	Total
W	Tom Koehler, Jacksonville Suns	16
ERA	Elih Villanueva, Jacksonville Suns	2.26
CG	Elih Villanueva, Jacksonville Suns	4
SHO	Elih Villanueva, Jacksonville Suns	3
SV	Anthony Carter, Birmingham Barons; Matt Gorgen, Montgomery Biscuits	22
IP	Elih Villanueva, Jacksonville Suns	179.0
SO	Alex Torres, Montgomery Biscuits	150

== Playoffs ==
- The Jacksonville Suns won their second consecutive, and fifth overall Southern League championship, defeating the Tennessee Smokies in four games.

=== Playoff bracket ===
Division finals
N1	Tennessee	3
N2	West Tenn	1
S1	Jacksonville	3
S2	Mobile	1

Finals
N1	Tennessee	1
S1	Jacksonville	3

== Awards ==
Southern League awards
Award name	Recipient
Most Valuable Player	Dave Sappelt, Carolina Mudcats
Pitcher of the Year	Tom Koehler, Jacksonville Suns
Manager of the Year	Bill Dancy, Tennessee Smokies

== See also ==
- 2010 Major League Baseball season
