= St. Ladislaus High School =

Location
- 2730 Caniff St., Hamtramck, Michigan; United States
- Coordinates: 42°23′57.7″N 83°03′37.5″W

Information
- Type: Private, Coed
- Established: 1921
- Closed: 1981
- Grades: 9–12
- Colors: Scarlet and Grey
- Song: St. Ladislaus We Sing To You
- Athletics conference: Catholic High School League
- Nickname: Greyhounds

St. Ladislaus High School was a coeducational Catholic high school in Hamtramck, Michigan. It opened in 1921 and was run by the Sisters of St. Francis (Sylvania, Ohio). The school closed in 1981.

== Notable alumni ==
- John Paciorek (1964), Former MLB player
- Tom Paciorek (1965), Former MLB player
- Doug Konieczny (1969), Former MLB pitcher
