= Anaheim High School =

Public high school in California, United States

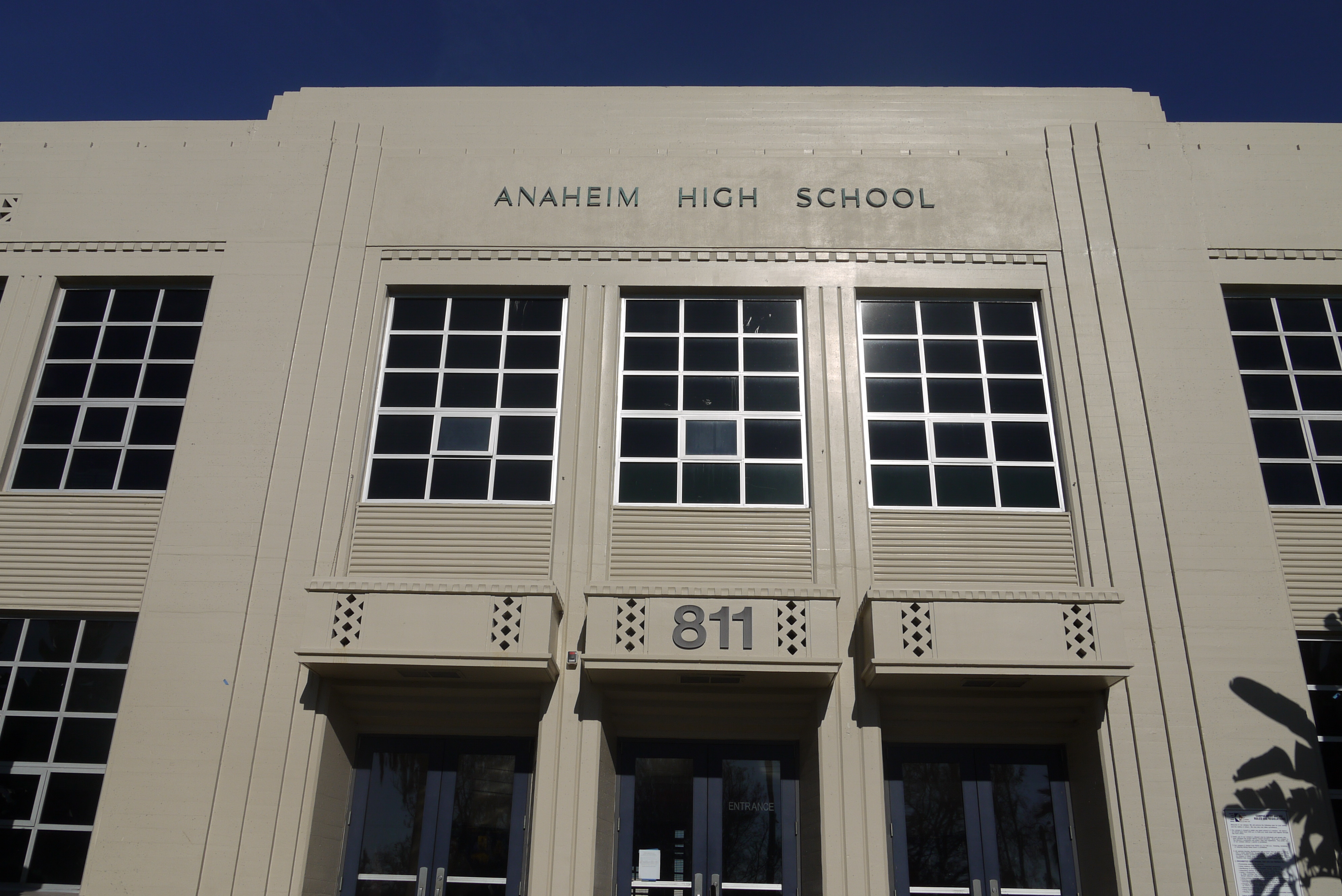

Location
- 811 West Lincoln Avenue; Anaheim, California; 33°50′04″N 117°55′32″W

Information
- Type: Public
- Established: 1898
- School district: Anaheim Union High School District
- Principal: Ruben Calleros
- Faculty: 131.07 (FTE)
- Grades: 9–12
- Enrollment: 2,750 (2022–23)
- Student to teacher ratio: 20.98
- Colors: Navy Blue and Gold
- Mascot: Colonists
- Website: anaheimhs.org

Anaheim High School is a public, four-year high school in the city of Anaheim, California, United States and serves students living in the Colony District of Anaheim. Anaheim High School was first established in 1898, which makes it the oldest of nine comprehensive high schools in the Anaheim Union High School District. It is the third oldest high school in Orange County, behind Santa Ana High School (1889) and Fullerton Union High School (1893).

== History ==
=== Beginnings ===
Following the arrival of the initial German settlers, they formally request the Los Angeles County superintendent to set up a school in Anaheim, their newly adopted town near the Santa Ana River.

From 1874 through 1881 James Guinn was the elementary school principal in a temporary building and offered subjects that would lead to a high school diploma. The first student to graduate with a high school diploma was in 1880. Students at that time had an oral examination as a graduation requirement and the public was invited to come for local entertainment. In 1878, Guinn wrote and championed the first school bond in the United States for the construction of the Central School. He left Anaheim to become the superintendent of the Los Angeles High School District in 1881.

High School classes officially started in 1898 on the second floor of the Central School that was located where George Washington Park is now. Within three years this facility was outgrown. A school bond for $12,500 was raised in 1901 for a school to be built on the south side of Center Street (now called Lincoln Ave) near Citron Street and became Anaheim High School; it was the third high school in Orange County proceeded by Santa Ana and Fullerton High. In 1908 Loara and Magnolia Elementary School Districts were sending their students to Anaheim High and the parents wanted some authority in the high school, therefore Anaheim Union High School District was formed. In 1910 more space was needed and voters approved a bond in 1911 for $105,000 to buy eleven acres of land at the north east corner of Center Street (Lincoln Ave) and Citron just a half block away.

=== Pre-World War II ===
In 1912 the new campus was dedicated and graduated its first class with seventeen students. The buildings were designed in the Greek revival style with Ionic Greek columns and a Parthenon-type frieze on the cornice over the main entrance. The interior had elegant plantings in the various patios. In March 1920 bonds amounting to $175,000 were sold to erect a new auditorium and classroom building, a domestic science building, gymnasium, wood shop, auto shop and machine shop. When the 1924 swimming pool opened it was the first in Orange County schools. The school was the pride of the community for twenty-two years until the 1933 Long Beach earthquake occurred and rendered them unsafe. The current Art Deco main building, library and auditorium completed and dedicated in 1936 at a cost of $500,000 replaced the unsafe Greek revival buildings and was very modern for the time. At the time it was called the "finest building of its kind in Southern California" and the new pride of the community.

The sunken garden and fountain completed in 1937 were filled in and replaced by the day "Cereal Bowl" fountain in 1964, which is now gone. All of the work in the 1930s "Depression Era" was being done through the WPA (Works Projects Administration) project #8291. In 1940 the new pipe organ was installed in the auditorium. A new pool was built in the late 1940s to replace the 1924 pool.

=== Late 20th century ===
When Western High School opened in 1958, Anaheim Union High School changed back to its original name, Anaheim High School. New buildings were constructed at that time replacing the remaining pre-earthquake code buildings. The 1957 brick Senior Circle constructed in front of the music building is now gone. In 1972 the Art Quad and other buildings were built to replace the old barracks that had been temporary quarters for fifteen years. Wimpy's Stand (selling burgers) was a popular landmark for several decades and was changed into the Student Activities Office in 1977. In 2007 it was razed.

Beginning in 1954, Anaheim Union High School went to a three-grade format with sophomores, juniors, and seniors in attendance. Following the closure of Fremont Junior High School in 1979 and declining district-wide enrollments, AHS reverted to having a freshman class and a four-year student schedule beginning in 1980.

=== 21st century ===
The Clayes Field bleachers, which had been originally constructed in 1922 and was the only building on the campus that had survived the earthquake in 1933, was condemned in the early 2000s and was demolished in 2017.

The on-campus pool built during the 1940s had also fallen into disuse by the 1990s and was condemned in the early 2000s. In 2019, a new aquatic center was opened and was named in honor of Jon Urbanchek, a former swimming and water polo coach there who later gained fame coaching numerous U.S. Olympic teams. The current facility was constructed on the footprint of the old pool.

The newest buildings on the west side of campus on West Street complement the Main building's Art Deco style. They were completed at the end of 2008 and classes started in February 2009.

In 2013, the school was sanctioned by Educational Testing Service for violating Advanced Placement exam policies when a U.S. History teacher proctored an AP European History test. The school risked losing its ability to administer AP exams, and school board members have said they were not informed by staff about the issue.

== Athletics ==
Anaheim's athletic teams are called the Colonists.

=== Football ===
The 1956 Anaheim football team was CIF co-champions with Downey, playing to a 13–13 tie at the Los Angeles Memorial Coliseum. That game had an official attendance of 41,383 fans, which remains the largest crowd in CIF-Southern Section history. Some accounts claim the actual attendance could have been closer to 50,000-60,000 fans.

=== Baseball ===
In 2022 Anaheim High School varsity baseball team went 22-11-1 and reached the CIF-Southern Section Division Division 6 championship game.

== Notable alumni ==
- Gustavo Arellano (1997) – writer, journalist, professor
- Dick Baney (1965) – baseball player (Seattle Pilots, Cincinnati Reds)
- Dan Barker (1967) – author, atheist, and co-president of Freedom From Religion Foundation
- Keith Beebe (1939) – football player with the New York Giants
- Charles Burlingame (1967) – pilot of American Airlines Flight 77, which crashed into Pentagon on September 11, 2001
- Lou Correa (1976) – California State Senator, Member of the House of Representatives for California's 46th Congressional District
- Ron Davini (1965) – 1967 MVP in College World Series (Arizona State University) who has worked with USA Baseball
- Reuben Droughns (1996) – NFL running back with Denver Broncos, Cleveland Browns, Super Bowl XLII champion with the New York Giants
- Jim Fassel (1967) – head coach of the New York Giants 1997–2003, NFL Coach of the Year for 1997
- Tim Flannery (1975) – MLB infielder with San Diego Padres and coach with San Francisco Giants
- Bobby Hatfield (1958) – singer and member of the duo The Righteous Brothers
- Tony Kanal (1988) – bassist of No Doubt
- Thomas Kuchel (1928) – U.S. Senator from California (1953–1969)
- Gerry Mullins (1967) – football player with USC and Pittsburgh Steelers, started four Super Bowls at right guard for Steelers
- Brian Noble (1980) – football player with Arizona State and Green Bay Packers
- Loy Petersen (1965) – professional basketball player
- Alyson Reed (1976) – Tony Award-nominated actress (Cabaret, A Chorus Line, High School Musical)
- Jerry Shipkey (1943) - football player with UCLA, USC, also All-Pro cornerback for the Pittsburgh Steelers
- Jerry Stephenson (1962) – baseball player (Boston Red Sox, Seattle Pilots, Los Angeles Dodgers)
- Stacey Lynn Swain aka Stacey Q (1976) – pop singer, songwriter, dancer and actress who charted with SSQ and as a solo act.
- Jorge Villafaña (2007) – soccer player for Portland Timbers and Santos Laguna
- Charles Walters (1930) – Hollywood director and choreographer ("The Barkleys of Broadway", "High Society", "Walk Don't Run")
- Marie Wilson (1932) – radio, film, television actress best known for My Friend Irma", "The Invisible Menace and A Girl in Every Port

== Notable faculty ==
- Jon Urbanchek – health teacher & aquatics coach 1964–1978, later head coach of aquatics at Long Beach State (1978–1981) and the University of Michigan (1982–2004); also longtime U.S. Olympic swim team coach
