= Keith Beebe =

American football player (1921–1998)

- Beebe, circa 1950

No. 44
- Position: Back

Personal information
- Born: March 16, 1921; Anaheim, California, U.S.
- Died: July 13, 1998 (aged 77); Philadelphia, Pennsylvania, U.S.
- Listed height: 5 ft 9 in (1.75 m)
- Listed weight: 180 lb (82 kg)

Career information
- High school: Anaheim
- College: Occidental (1939–1942)
- NFL draft: 1943: 24th round, 226th overall pick

Career history
- New York Giants (1944)

Career NFL statistics
- Rushing yards: 12
- Rushing average: 1.5
- Interceptions: 3
- Punts: 7
- Punt yards: 206
- Stats at Pro Football Reference

Dr. Hiram Keith Beebe (March 16, 1921 – July 13, 1998) was an American professional football back who played one season with the New York Giants of the National Football League (NFL). He was selected by the Giants in the 24th round of the 1943 NFL draft after playing college football at Occidental College.

== Early life and college ==
Hiram Keith Beebe was born on March 16, 1921, in Anaheim, California. He attended Anaheim High School in Anaheim.

Beebe was a member of the Occidental Tigers of Occidental College from 1939 to 1942 and a three-year letterman from 1940 to 1942.

== Professional career ==
Beebe was selected by the New York Giants in the 24th round, with the 226th overall pick, of the 1943 NFL draft. He signed with the Giants in 1944. He played in five games during the 1944 season, totaling three interception for 26 yards on defense, seven punt returns for 206 yards, eight rushes for 12 yards, and one completion on three passing attempts for nine yards and one interception.

== Personal life ==
Beebe was an ordained minister. He spent time as the "assistant to the dean of the chapel" at Princeton University. In 1950, he was named an assistant coach for the Princeton Tigers freshman football team. Beebe was later a professor at his alma mater, Occidental College. He was also a professor at the Beirut College for Women in Lebanon. He died on July 13, 1998, in Philadelphia, Pennsylvania.
