= 1967 Ohio State Buckeyes baseball team =

American college baseball season

1967 Ohio State Buckeyes baseball

Big Ten Conference

1967 College World Series, T-7th
- Conference: Big Ten Conference

Ranking
- Coaches: No. 7
- CB: No. 7
- Record: 25–20–3 (13–5 Big Ten)
- Head coach: Marty Karow (17th season)
- Captain: Ray Shoup
- Home stadium: Trautman Field

1967 Big Ten Conference baseball standings
	Conf.						Overall
Team	W		L		T	PCT	W		L		T	PCT
No. 7 Ohio State ‍†‍‍^{y}	13	–	5	–	0	.722	25	–	20	–	3	.552
No. 16 Michigan ‍‍‍	10	–	4	–	0	.714	24	–	12	–	0	.667
No. 15 Minnesota ‍‍‍	12	–	5	–	0	.706	32	–	10	–	0	.762
Wisconsin ‍‍‍	11	–	6	–	0	.647	18	–	15	–	0	.545
Iowa ‍‍‍	8	–	9	–	0	.471	19	–	12	–	1	.609
Michigan State ‍‍‍	8	–	10	–	0	.444	22	–	23	–	1	.489
Purdue ‍‍‍	7	–	9	–	0	.438	14	–	18	–	0	.438
Indiana ‍‍‍	6	–	12	–	0	.333	14	–	23	–	0	.378
Illinois ‍‍‍	5	–	11	–	0	.313	17	–	21	–	0	.447
Northwestern ‍‍‍	4	–	13	–	0	.235	11	–	22	–	0	.333
† – Conference champion y – Invited to the College World Series; As of June 30, 1967; Rankings from Collegiate Baseball

The 1967 Ohio State Buckeyes baseball team represented the Ohio State University in the 1967 NCAA University Division baseball season. The head coach was Marty Karow, serving his 17th year.

The Buckeyes lost in the College World Series, defeated by the Houston Cougars.

== Roster ==
1967 Ohio State Buckeyes baseball team
Players
Coaches

#	Pos.	Name	B/T	Height	Weight	Year	Home town
	P	Dick Boggs	/	—	—	Jr
		Albert Budding	/	—	—	Sr
		Glenn Bergman	/	—	—	Sr
	C	Daniel Carlson	/	—	—	So
	INF	Ralph Copp	/	—	—	Sr
		Frank Cozze	/	—	—	Sr
		David Dillon	/	—	—	Sr
	P	Jerome Glaser	/	—	—	So
		James Hearst	/	—	—	Sr
	INF	Bruce Heine	/	—	—	Jr
		James Irvin	/	—	—	So
		Dennis Jacobs	/	—	—	Sr
		Frederick Krull	/	—	—	So
		Stephen McLaughlin	/	—	—	Sr
		Wayne Mogan	/	—	—	Sr
		Jeff Morehead	/	—	—	Jr
	OF	Bo Rein	R/R	5 ft 11 in (1.8 m)	182 lb (83 kg)	Sr
	LHP	Joe Sadelfeld	R/L	6 ft 3 in (1.91 m)	200 lb (91 kg)	So
	OF	Ray Shoup (C)	L/R	5 ft 11 in (1.8 m)	170 lb (77 kg)	Sr	Youngstown, Ohio
	P	Keith Stilwell	/	—	—	Jr
	P	Ralph Swain	/	—	—	Jr
	P	Peter Wolfe	/	—	—	Sr

Head coach

Marty Karow

Assistant coach(es)

Legend

- (C) Team captain
- (S) Suspended
- (I) Ineligible
- Injured
- Current redshirt

== Schedule ==
1967 Ohio State Buckeyes baseball game log
Regular season
March (5–5–1)

#	Date	Opponent	Site/stadium	Score	Overall record	Big Ten record
1	March 17	at Cal State Los Angeles	Reeder Field • Los Angeles, California	4–3	1–0	0–0
2	March 18	at Cal State Los Angeles	Reeder Field • Los Angeles, California	3–9	1–1	0–0
3	March 20	at UC Riverside	Unknown • Riverside, California	5–5	1–1–1	0–0
4	March 21	vs Wyoming	Sawtelle Field • Los Angeles, California	5–4	2–1–1	0–0
5	March 22	vs BYU	Sawtelle Field • Los Angeles, California	11–14	2–2–1	0–0
6	March 23	vs Yale	Sawtelle Field • Los Angeles, California	4–5	2–3–1	0–0
7	March 24	vs Washington	Sawtelle Field • Los Angeles, California	4–1	3–3–1	0–0
8	March 25	at UCLA	Sawtelle Field • Los Angeles, California	3–4	3–4–1	0–0
9	March 26	vs Mississippi State	Sawtelle Field • Los Angeles, California	4–11	3–5–1	0–0
10	March 31	Ohio Wesleyan	Trautman Field • Columbus, Ohio	18–0	4–5–1	0–0
11	March 31	Ohio Wesleyan	Trautman Field • Columbus, Ohio	15–5	5–5–1	0–0

April (7–10–2)

#	Date	Opponent	Site/stadium	Score	Overall record	Big Ten record
12	April 1	Kent State	Trautman Field • Columbus, Ohio	3–4	5–6–1	0–0
13	April 1	Kent State	Trautman Field • Columbus, Ohio	0–2	5–7–1	0–0
14	April 7	Cincinnati	Trautman Field • Columbus, Ohio	2–2	5–7–2	0–0
15	April 8	Cincinnati	Trautman Field • Columbus, Ohio	8–4	6–7–2	0–0
16	April 8	Cincinnati	Trautman Field • Columbus, Ohio	0–2	6–8–2	0–0
17	April 11	Toledo	Trautman Field • Columbus, Ohio	5–2	7–8–2	0–0
18	April 14	Michigan State	Trautman Field • Columbus, Ohio	10–9	8–8–2	1–0
19	April 14	Michigan State	Trautman Field • Columbus, Ohio	3–2	9–8–2	2–0
20	April 15	Michigan	Trautman Field • Columbus, Ohio	8–2	10–8–2	3–0
21	April 15	Michigan	Trautman Field • Columbus, Ohio	1–5	10–9–2	3–1
22	April 18	at Western Michigan	Hyames Field • Kalamazoo, Michigan	2–3	10–10–2	3–1
23	April 18	at Western Michigan	Hyames Field • Kalamazoo, Michigan	2–5	10–11–2	3–1
24	April 21	Southern Illinois	Trautman Field • Columbus, Ohio	3–0	11–11–2	3–1
25	April 21	Southern Illinois	Trautman Field • Columbus, Ohio	2–3	11–12–2	3–1
26	April 22	Southern Illinois	Trautman Field • Columbus, Ohio	5–7	11–13–2	3–1
27	April 22	Southern Illinois	Trautman Field • Columbus, Ohio	12–0	12–13–2	3–1
28	April 25	at Bowling Green	Steller Field • Bowling Green, Ohio	6–6	12–13–3	3–1
29	April 28	at Indiana	Sembower Field • Bloomington, Indiana	1–2	12–14–3	3–2
30	April 29	at Indiana	Sembower Field • Bloomington, Indiana	0–5	12–15–3	3–3

May (10–4)

#	Date	Opponent	Site/stadium	Score	Overall record	Big Ten record
31	May 5	at Wisconsin	Guy Lowman Field • Madison, Wisconsin	4–1	13–15–3	4–3
32	May 5	at Wisconsin	Guy Lowman Field • Madison, Wisconsin	2–3	13–16–3	4–4
33	May 6	at Northwestern	Wells Field • Evanston, Illinois	5–0	14–16–3	5–4
34	May 6	at Northwestern	Wells Field • Evanston, Illinois	1–0	15–16–3	6–4
35	May 12	Illinois	Trautman Field • Columbus, Ohio	3–2	16–16–3	7–4
36	May 12	Illinois	Trautman Field • Columbus, Ohio	6–2	17–16–3	8–4
37	May 13	Purdue	Trautman Field • Columbus, Ohio	3–0	18–16–3	9–4
38	May 13	Purdue	Trautman Field • Columbus, Ohio	7–1	19–16–3	10–4
39	May 19	at Minnesota	Delta Field • Minneapolis, Minnesota	0–7	19–17–3	10–5
41	May 19	at Minnesota	Delta Field • Minneapolis, Minnesota	12–9	20–17–3	11–5
42	May 20	at Iowa	Unknown • Iowa City, Iowa	2–1	21–17–3	12–5
43	May 20	at Iowa	Unknown • Iowa City, Iowa	1–0	22–17–3	13–5

Postseason
District IV Tournament (3–1)

#	Date	Opponent	Site/stadium	Score	Overall record	Big Ten record
44	May 25	vs Valparaiso	Abe Martin Field • Carbondale, Illinois	3–2	23–17–3	13–5
45	May 26	at Southern Illinois	Abe Martin Field • Carbondale, Illinois	5–4	24–17–3	13–5
46	May 27	vs Western Michigan	Abe Martin Field • Carbondale, Illinois	4–5	24–18–3	13–5
47	May 27	vs Western Michigan	Abe Martin Field • Carbondale, Illinois	5–4	25–18–3	13–5

1967 College World Series (0–2)

#	Date	Opponent	Site/stadium	Score	Overall record	Big Ten record
48	June 12	vs Auburn	Johnny Rosenblatt Stadium • Omaha, Nebraska	0–1	25–19–3	13–5
49	June 13	Houston	Johnny Rosenblatt Stadium • Omaha, Nebraska	6–7	25–20–3	13–5

== Awards and honors ==
Joe Sadelfeld

- First Team All-Big Ten

Ray Shoup

- First Team All-Big Ten
- First Team All-American
