= John Paciorek =

American baseball player (born 1945)

- Outfielder
- Born: February 11, 1945 (age 81); Detroit, Michigan, U.S.
- Batted: Right Threw: Right

MLB debut
- September 29, 1963, for the Houston Colt .45s

Last MLB appearance
- September 29, 1963, for the Houston Colt .45s

MLB statistics
- Batting average: 1.000 (3-for-3)
- Plate appearances: 5
- Runs batted in: 3
- Stats at Baseball Reference

Teams
- Houston Colt .45s (1963)

John Francis Paciorek (/pəˈtʃɔːrɪk/; born February 11, 1945) is an American former professional baseball player. He attended high school in Michigan, and was signed by the Houston Colt .45s while playing for the school's baseball team. After a season in the minor leagues, he was promoted to the Colt .45's active roster, and played in one game at the end of the 1963 Houston Colt .45s season. In that game, he had three hits and two walks. However, injuries cut his career short; he missed most of 1964 and 1965 due to surgery, and retired after playing parts of four more seasons in the minors. He returned to school, graduated from the University of Houston, and became a physical education teacher after retiring.

Paciorek is rare among Major League Baseball players in having a perfect batting average of 1.000. He is the only player to achieve this distinction with more than two at bats. His two brothers, Jim Paciorek and Tom Paciorek, also played in the major leagues.

== Early life ==
Paciorek was born in Detroit on February 11, 1945. His father was a factory worker in Plymouth, Michigan. He was the oldest of eight children; two of his brothers, Tom and Jim, went on to have MLB careers as well. He attended St. Ladislaus High School in Hamtramck, Michigan, and was named to the varsity baseball team as a freshman. During his high school career, he focused on strength building to achieve his dream of being a baseball player. By the time he graduated, he had gone from 119 pounds (54 kg) to 200 pounds (91 kg), and was an all-state three-sport star in baseball, football, and basketball. Paciorek also played on Detroit's team in the National Amateur Baseball Federation; he was named most valuable player during the annual tournament in 1962. While he was still in high school, Houston general manager Paul Richards convinced Paciorek to sign with the Colt .45s; the two agreed to a $45,000 contract.

== Baseball career ==
In late 1962, Paciorek attended an instructional league put on by Houston, which led to him becoming part of the team's spring training roster as one of 63 invited players. During exhibition play, he "hit everything in sight", and had a batting average of over .300. After spring training ended, he began his professional career with the Modesto Colts of the California League and played in 78 games for the team with a .219 batting average and 15 doubles. Late in the season, he injured his back and shoulder; he was diagnosed with a sciatic nerve injury, and was told to rest. Shortly afterward, however, Houston brought Paciorek and seven other rookies onto the major league roster to play in the season finale on September 29. (Two days earlier, the Colts had started an all-rookie lineup; to date, the only time an MLB club has attempted this. The starting pitcher for Houston that day was 17-year-old Jay Dahl, marking his only big-league appearance.)

Paciorek, who was the starting right fielder, began the day with a walk in the second inning. He then had a single in the fourth inning, which drove in Rusty Staub and Bob Aspromonte. After singling and again bringing home Aspromonte in the fifth, Paciorek had a walk in the sixth, and ended the day with a leadoff single in the eighth. In total, he went to the plate five times and hit three singles and had two walks, scoring four runs en route to a 13–4 Houston victory over the New York Mets. He had a perfect major league career batting average and on-base percentage of 1.000 as a result of his performance that day, something no one else with as many plate appearances as Paciorek has done.

Thanks in part to his performance in the final game of Houston's season, Paciorek was invited to spring training for Houston in 1964. His performances included a bases-loaded triple against the Mets. However, his poor play on both offense and defense late in spring training led to him being cut despite being nearly a lock to make the roster. He spent part of the year on the Durham Bulls and Statesville Colts, where he had a .135 batting average in 49 combined games. Partway through the year, he had spinal fusion surgery, which caused Paciorek to miss the rest of the 1964 season, as well as all of 1965.

Paciorek returned to the Houston organization in 1966, and split the season with the Batavia Trojans and Salisbury Astros, where he hit .193 in 77 combined games. The following year, he played for the Asheville Tourists and Cocoa Astros, had a .104 average in 32 games, and was released at season's end. He was given a second chance to return to the major leagues when the Cleveland Indians, who were scouting his brother Tom at the University of Houston, signed him to a minor league contract with a spring training invitation. He spent 1968 with the Single-A Reno Silver Sox and the Rock Hill Indians, and hit .268 with 20 home runs in 95 total games; his 17 home runs with Reno led the team. Paciorek was promoted the following year to the Double-A Waterbury Indians and played in 29 games with them, but tore his achilles tendon during warm-ups, which led to his release and the end of his professional career.

== Post-baseball career ==
After his baseball career ended, Paciorek returned to school and earned a degree in physical education from the University of Houston, a degree that he began to pursue while recovering from back surgery. While acquiring his degree, he became a Christian Scientist and married Linda Cupp. After graduating from college, he spent several years as an instructor at a Jewish community center, then became a physical education teacher after inquiring about a Christian Science Monitor advertisement for a teaching position at Clairbourn School in San Gabriel, California. Linda died of breast cancer in 1987, and Paciorek married Karen Purdy two years later. Paciorek has four sons and four daughters. His nephew, Joey Paciorek, played in the Milwaukee Brewers minor league organization, and his sons, Pete and Mack, had minor league careers as well. While watching his son in training camp, Paciorek became an author after watching what he felt was improper instruction given to the players. He has since written two books, Plato & Socrates, Baseball's Wisest Fans and The Principle of Baseball, and All There is to Know About Hitting.

Two of his brothers, Jim Paciorek and Tom Paciorek, also played in the Major Leagues.
