= 1967 Houston Cougars baseball team =

American college baseball season

1967 Houston Cougars baseball
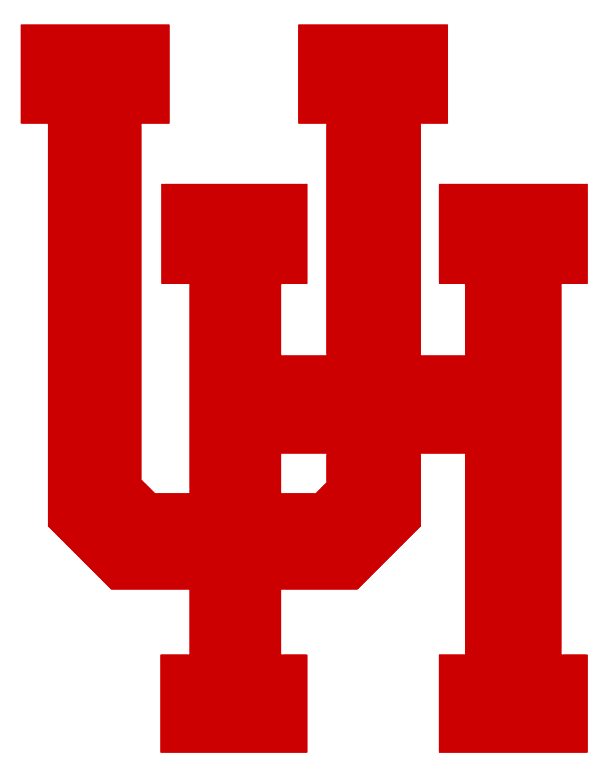

District 6 champions

College World Series, Runner-up
- Conference: Independent
- CB: No. 2
- Record: 21–11
- Head coach: Lovette Hill (18th season)
- Home stadium: Cougar Field

The 1967 Houston Cougars baseball team represented the University of Houston in the 1967 NCAA University Division baseball season. The Cougars played their home games at the original Cougar Field. The team was coached by Lovette Hill in his 18th season at Houston.

The Cougars lost the College World Series, defeated by the Arizona State Sun Devils in the championship game.

== Roster ==
1967 Houston Cougars roster
Pitchers: 19 Rick Brewer - Senior; 17 Bubba Hill - Sophomore; 6 Wayne Hill - Junior; 16 Carroll Moore - Senior; 1 Van Smith - Senior; 21 Jim Sparkman - Sophomore; 18 Ron Stasny - Sophomore	Catchers: 10 Chico Silman - Sophomore; 11 Larry Strelau - Junior; Infielders: 4 Ronnie Baker - Junior; 5 G. J. Cantu - Senior; 23 Ken Hebert - Junior; 20 Larry Satcher - Junior; 12 Art Toombs - Sophomore; 14 Wayne Westphal - Junior; 2 Trey Williams - Sophomore	Outfielders: 15 Bo Burris - Senior; 9 Ike Lucas - Senior; 22 Tom Paciorek - Junior; 13 Phil Rose - Sophomore

== Schedule and results ==
Legend
Houston win
Houston loss
Houston tie

1967 Houston Cougars baseball game log
Regular season (16–8)

March (8–4)
Date	Opponent	Site/stadium	Score	Overall record
March	Nicholls State	Cougar Field • Houston, Texas	5–2	1–0
March	Nicholls State	Cougar Field • Houston, Texas	2–6	1–2
March	St. Mary's (TX)	Cougar Field • Houston, Texas	9–7	2–1
March	Lamar	Cougar Field • Houston, Texas	10–4	3–1
March	Lamar	Cougar Field • Houston, Texas	12–2	4–1
March 24	at Baylor	Unknown • Waco, Texas	4–2	5–1
March 25	at Baylor	Unknown • Waco, Texas	7–8	5–2
March 27	Oklahoma State	Cougar Field • Houston, Texas	5–4	6–2
March 28	Oklahoma State	Cougar Field • Houston, Texas	5–6	6–3
March 30	Nebraska	Cougar Field • Houston, Texas	2–16	6–4
March 30	Nebraska	Cougar Field • Houston, Texas	6–3	7–4
March 31	Oklahoma State	Cougar Field • Houston, Texas	4–1	8–4

April (8–4)
Date	Opponent	Site/stadium	Score	Overall record
April 1	Nebraska	Cougar Field • Houston, Texas	7–4	9–4
April	at St. Mary's (TX)	Unknown • San Antonio, Texas	10–1	10–4
April	at Texas Lutheran	Unknown • Seguin, Texas	2–5	10–5
April	at Texas A&M	Kyle Baseball Field • College Station, Texas	4–6	10–6
April	at Texas A&M	Kyle Baseball Field • College Station, Texas	1–2	10–7
April	St. Thomas (TX)	Cougar Field • Houston, Texas	12–1	11–7
April	St. Thomas (TX)	Cougar Field • Houston, Texas	4–3	12–7
April	Sam Houston State	Cougar Field • Houston, Texas	0–3	12–8
April	Texas Lutheran	Cougar Field • Houston, Texas	3–1	13–8
April	Houston Baptist	Cougar Field • Houston, Texas	6–3	14–8
April	Houston Baptist	Cougar Field • Houston, Texas	5–0	15–8
April	Sam Houston State	Cougar Field • Houston, Texas	1–0	16–8

Postseason (5–3)

District 6 playoff (2–1)
Date	Opponent	Site/stadium	Score	Overall record
May 16	Texas	Cougar Field • Houston, Texas	11–8	17–8
May 18	at Texas	Clark Field • Austin, Texas	1–5	17–9
May 19	Texas	Cougar Field • Houston, Texas	4–3	18–9

1967 College World Series (3–2)
Date	Opponent	Site/stadium	Score	Overall record
June 12	vs Stanford	Johnny Rosenblatt Stadium • Omaha, Nebraska	1–12	18–10
June 13	vs Ohio State	Johnny Rosenblatt Stadium • Omaha, Nebraska	7–6	19–10
June 14	vs Boston College	Johnny Rosenblatt Stadium • Omaha, Nebraska	3–2	20–10
June 16	vs Arizona State	Johnny Rosenblatt Stadium • Omaha, Nebraska	3–0	21–10
June 18	vs Arizona State	Johnny Rosenblatt Stadium • Omaha, Nebraska	2–11	21–11

Schedule source:

== Awards and honors ==
Ike Lucas

- All Tournament Team

Tom Paciorek

- All Tournament Team
- AACBC First Team All-America Team
