= Terry Doyle =

American baseball player (born 1985)

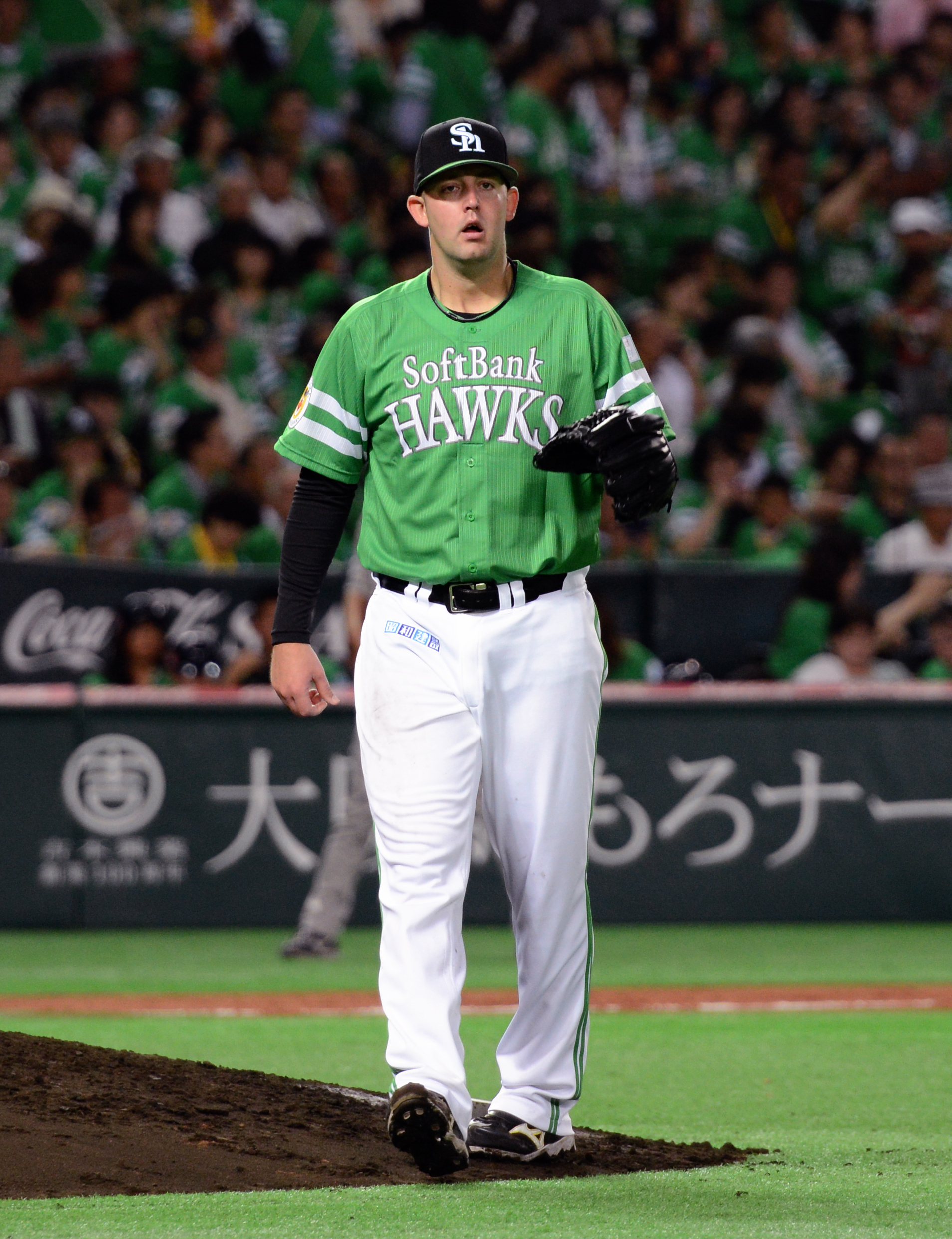
- Doyle with the Fukuoka SoftBank Hawks
- Pitcher
- Born: November 2, 1985 (age 40); Concord, Massachusetts, U.S.
- Batted: Right Threw: Right

NPB debut
- July 16, 2012, for the Fukuoka SoftBank Hawks

Last NPB appearance
- August 23, 2012, for the Fukuoka SoftBank Hawks

Career statistics
- Win–loss record: 1–1
- Earned run average: 3.55
- Strikeouts: 7
- Stats at Baseball Reference

Teams
- Fukuoka SoftBank Hawks (2012)

John Terence Doyle (born November 2, 1985) is an American former professional baseball pitcher. He played in Nippon Professional Baseball (NPB) for the Fukuoka SoftBank Hawks.

== College career ==
Doyle attended Salem High School in Salem, New Hampshire, where he was twice named The Eagle-Tribune's Player of the Year. He then attended Boston College, where he played for the Boston College Eagles squad.

In 2006 and 2007, Doyle played collegiate summer baseball for the Yarmouth–Dennis Red Sox of the Cape Cod Baseball League, where he was named an all-star and was co-recipient of the league's outstanding pitcher award in 2006. Doyle was selected by the Los Angeles Dodgers in the 21st round of the 2007 MLB draft, but he returned to college for his senior year in order to improve his draft stock.

== Professional career ==
=== Chicago White Sox ===
The Chicago White Sox drafted Doyle in the 37th round, with the 1,110th overall selection, of the 2008 Major League Baseball draft, even though he sported a 5.87 earned run average (ERA) over 69 innings pitched for the Eagles in his senior season. The Sox subsequently assigned Doyle to the rookie–level Bristol White Sox in 2008, as he gained promotions to the rookie–level Great Falls Voyagers (2009), Single–A Kannapolis Intimidators (2010) and High–A Winston-Salem Dash (2010–2011), before joining the Double–A Birmingham Barons in 2011, midway through the season. With Birmingham, Doyle had a 7–5 win–loss record with a 3.07 ERA and 73 strikeouts in 15 starts, walking only 22 batters in 100 innings of work. He later pitched for the Mesa Solar Sox in the Arizona Fall League in the 2011 fall season.

On December 8, 2011, at the Winter Meetings, the Minnesota Twins selected Doyle in the Rule 5 draft. He struggled with the Twins during spring training and was sent back to the White Sox on March 21, 2012. Through June, Doyle posted a 6–3 record with a 2.83 ERA for the Charlotte Knights of the Triple–A International League, but the White Sox released Doyle on June 14, to allow him to pitch in Nippon Professional Baseball.

=== Fukuoka SoftBank Hawks ===
On June 17, 2012, Doyle signed with the Fukuoka SoftBank Hawks of Nippon Professional Baseball. He made 3 starts for the Hawks, recording a 3.55 ERA with 7 strikeouts across 12 2/3 innings pitched.

=== Boston Red Sox ===
On November 21, 2012, Doyle returned to the United States after signing a minor league contract with the Boston Red Sox that included an invitation to spring training. He then pitched for the Triple–A Pawtucket Red Sox and Double–A Portland Sea Dogs during the regular season. In between, Doyle played winter ball in the Mexican Pacific League with the Aguilas de Mexicali in 2013, and for the Cardenales de Lara club of the Venezuelan League in 2014.

=== Chicago White Sox (second stint) ===
On January 24, 2014, Doyle signed a minor league contract with the Chicago White Sox. In 8 starts for the Double–A Birmingham Barons, he pitched to a 4–4 record and 5.93 ERA with 27 strikeouts across 41 innings pitched. Doyle was released by the White Sox organization on May 16.

=== Atlanta Braves ===
On June 2, 2014, Doyle signed a minor league contract with the Atlanta Braves organization. In 5 games for the Double–A Mississippi Braves, he posted a 2.79 ERA with 8 strikeouts. Doyle was promoted to the Triple–A Gwinnett Braves in June, for whom he compiled a 4–4 record and 2.93 ERA with 44 strikeouts across 23 appearances.

=== Baltimore Orioles ===
On November 20, 2014, Doyle signed a minor league contract with the Baltimore Orioles. In 26 games (21 starts) split between the Double–A Bowie Baysox and the Triple–A Norfolk Tides, Doyle went 16–2 with a 2.16 ERA. Over 158 2/3 innings, he gave up 137 hits with just 22 walks and 110 strikeouts. He elected free agency on November 6, 2015.

Doyle re–signed with the Orioles organization on a minor league contract on December 12, 2015, and was assigned to Norfolk to begin the 2016 season. In 6 starts for Bowie and Norfolk, he logged an 0–4 record and 5.19 ERA with 21 strikeouts across 34 2/3 innings pitched. On April 27, 2016, Doyle was released by the Orioles organization.

=== Lancaster Barnstormers ===
On May 10, 2016, Doyle signed with the Lancaster Barnstormers of the Atlantic League of Professional Baseball. In 19 starts for the Barnstormers, Doyle compiled a 6–6 record and 3.29 ERA with 72 strikeouts across 123 innings pitched.

=== Arizona Diamondbacks ===
On August 26, 2016, Doyle signed a minor league contract with the Arizona Diamondbacks organization. He reported to the Mobile BayBears of the Double–A Southern League, for whom he made two starts and registered a 3.86 ERA with 9 strikeouts across 11 2/3 innings pitched. Doyle elected free agency following the season on November 7.

== Scouting report ==
Doyle's fastball does not have great velocity. As a result, he throws his two-seam fastball more often than his four-seam fastball. He also has a curveball, slider, and changeup. Doyle relies on control of his pitches.

== Coaching career ==
Doyle was named head coach of the New England College baseball team in January 2019.

== Personal life ==
Doyle majored in math at Boston College. Due to dermatitis, he returned to college during his senior year to obtain his teaching credentials. During the offseason, Doyle worked as a substitute teacher and rotated between three high schools located in Warwick, Rhode Island.

== See also ==
- Rule 5 draft results
