= Jim Paciorek =

American baseball player (born 1960)

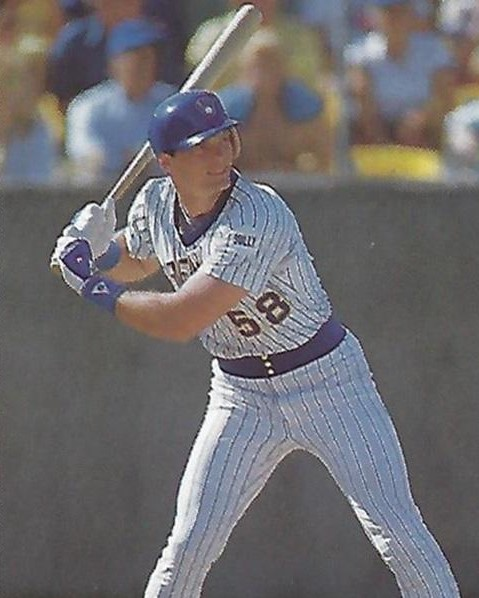
- First baseman / Outfielder
- Born: June 7, 1960 (age 66); Detroit, Michigan, U.S.
- Batted: Right Threw: Right

Professional debut
- MLB: April 9, 1987, for the Milwaukee Brewers
- NPB: April 8, 1988, for the Yokohama Taiyō Whales

Last appearance
- MLB: September 23, 1987, for the Milwaukee Brewers
- NPB: August 27, 1993, for the Hanshin Tigers

MLB statistics
- Batting average: .228
- Home runs: 2
- Runs batted in: 10

NPB statistics
- Batting average: .315
- Home runs: 86
- Runs batted in: 431
- Stats at Baseball Reference

Teams
- Milwaukee Brewers (1987); Yokohama Taiyō Whales (1988–1991); Hanshin Tigers (1992–1993)

Career highlights and awards
- 2x Central League all-star; 3x Central League Best Nine Award; 3x Central League leader in hits; Led Central League in batting, 1990; Central League Gold Glove, 1992
Medals
Men's baseball
Representing the United States
World Games
Gold medal – first place	1981 Santa Clara	Team

James Joseph Paciorek (born June 7, 1960) is an American former professional baseball player. He played first base, third base, and the outfield for the Milwaukee Brewers of Major League Baseball (MLB). He also played with the Yokohama Taiyo Whales and Hanshin Tigers in the Japanese Central League.

His two older brothers, John and Tom, also played in the major leagues.

== Biography ==
After graduating from Orchard Lake St. Mary's Preparatory, Paciorek played on both the baseball and football teams at the University of Michigan. In 1980, he played collegiate summer baseball with the Falmouth Commodores of the Cape Cod Baseball League. He graduated in 1981 and was drafted in the 14th round by the Cleveland Indians, but did not sign with the Indians. He was chosen in the 8th round by the Milwaukee Brewers the following year and signed with the Brewers in 1982. He spent most of his career in the minor leagues but played 48 major league games in 1987.

Paciorek had actually traveled to Japan during his college years to play in the Japanese college baseball league, and he chose to sign with the Yokohama Taiyo Whales (current Yokohama DeNA BayStars) in 1988. He ranked second in the league with a .332 average, and won the outfield Best Nine award that year. He remained one of the league's best hitters, batting fifth behind teammate Carlos Ponce, and won the Central League batting title in 1990. Paciorek ended the season with a batting average over .300 for the fourth consecutive year in 1991, but was cut from the team for hitting only 11 home runs.

After being cut, Paciorek had his best season in 1992 playing with the Hanshin Tigers. Paciorek had joined the Tigers at the suggestion of Tom O'Malley, and he led the league in hits to win a Best Nine award at first base. He also won the Central League Golden Glove Award that year.

Paciorek suffered a hip injury in 1993 and failed reach the .300 mark for the first time in Japan, hitting only 7 home runs with a .243 batting average in 74 games. He was dropped by the Tigers during the off-season. He returned to the United States, and in 1995 was a replacement player in spring training for the Seattle Mariners during the ongoing strike. After the strike ended, he did not play in a professional game.

On April 6, 2004, Paciorek traveled to Japan after 11 years to participate in the opening ceremony of a game between the Hanshin Tigers and Yokohama BayStars at Yokohama Stadium. Old-time fans of both teams still remembered Paciorek's contributions to Japanese baseball, and greeted him enthusiastically as he threw the opening pitch.
