= Tom Paciorek =

American baseball player (born 1946)

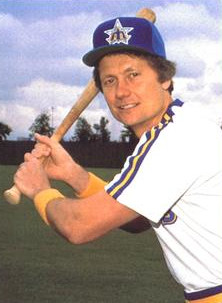
- Paciorek in 1981
- Outfielder / First baseman
- Born: November 2, 1946 (age 79); Detroit, Michigan, U.S.
- Batted: Right Threw: Right

MLB debut
- September 12, 1970, for the Los Angeles Dodgers

Last MLB appearance
- October 4, 1987, for the Texas Rangers

MLB statistics
- Batting average: .282
- Home runs: 86
- Runs batted in: 503
- Stats at Baseball Reference

Teams
- Los Angeles Dodgers (1970–1975); Atlanta Braves (1976–1978); Seattle Mariners (1978–1981); Chicago White Sox (1982–1985); New York Mets (1985); Texas Rangers (1986–1987)

Career highlights and awards
- All-Star (1981)

Thomas Marian Paciorek (/pəˈtʃɔːrɛk/ pə-CHOR-ehk; born November 2, 1946) is an American former outfielder and first baseman who spent 18 seasons in Major League Baseball (MLB) with the Los Angeles Dodgers (1970–1975), Atlanta Braves (1976–1978), Seattle Mariners (1978–1981), Chicago White Sox (1982–1985), New York Mets (1985) and Texas Rangers (1986–1987). He appeared twice in the postseason, with the National League (NL) champion Dodgers in 1974 and the American League (AL) West-winning White Sox in 1983.

Following his retirement as an active player, he worked as a color commentator for various MLB clubs, most notably the White Sox, on whose telecasts he was teamed with Ken Harrelson throughout the 1990s. Paciorek was known by the nickname "Wimpy," which was given to him by Tommy Lasorda after a dinner with minor league teammates in which he was the only one to order a hamburger instead of steak.

== Collegiate career ==
After graduating from St. Ladislaus High School in Hamtramck, Michigan, Paciorek played baseball and football for the University of Houston from 1965 to 1968. A defensive back, he was picked by the Miami Dolphins in the ninth round (240th overall) of the 1968 NFL/AFL draft. In baseball, he was named to the All-Tournament team after the Cougars reached the finals of the 1967 College World Series, and were the national runner-up to Arizona State. Paciorek's number is one of only three to be retired by the Cougars.

== Major league career ==
Paciorek was selected by the Los Angeles Dodgers in the fifth round (89th overall) of the 1968 Major League Baseball draft, one of eight players drafted by the Dodgers that year to reach the majors. A top prospect, he won The Sporting News Minor League Player of the Year Award in 1972 with the Triple-A Albuquerque Dukes.

Paciorek made his major league debut with the Dodgers on September 12, 1970, finishing the game 1-for-4 in an 8–3 loss to the San Francisco Giants. After making the majors full-time, he spent the 1973 through 1975 seasons as a fourth outfielder and pinch hitter. He contributed to the Dodgers' 1974 team that reached the World Series, but struggled during the 1975 season, finishing with a .193 batting average, a single home run, and 5 RBI in 62 games.

Paciorek was traded along with Jerry Royster, Lee Lacy and Jimmy Wynn from the Dodgers to the Atlanta Braves for Dusty Baker and Ed Goodson on November 17, 1975. He hit .290 with four home runs and 36 RBI in 111 games while playing in a platoon role for Atlanta in 1976. However, he struggled to duplicate those numbers the following year, batting .239 with three home runs and 15 RBI in 72 games. The Braves released Paciorek after spring training in 1978, but re-signed him just a week later. However, after six weeks and only nine at bats (with three hits), the Braves gave him his release a second time in May.

On May 31, 1978, Paciorek signed with the Seattle Mariners, for whom he hit .299 with four home runs and 30 RBI in 70 games.

Following two solid years as a platoon player, Paciorek put together a career season with the Mariners in 1981. Playing full-time for the only time in his career at age 34, Paciorek batted .326 with 14 home runs and 66 RBI in 104 games. His .326 average ranked second in the American League, and he was fourth in the AL in slugging percentage (.509). He earned his only appearance to an All-Star team at the 1981 Major League Baseball All-Star Game and was tenth in the AL MVP race.

After Paciorek requested increased compensation and a three-year contract, the Mariners traded him to the Chicago White Sox for Rod Allen, Todd Cruz and Jim Essian on December 11, 1981. He hit over .300 his first two years with the Sox, and was part of Chicago's division championship team in 1983.

With the White Sox in 1984, Paciorek replaced Ron Kittle in left field in the fourth inning of their game with the Milwaukee Brewers on May 8 – a game which went 25 innings, and was the longest game in major league history, as measured by time on the field. When it ended the following day, Paciorek had amassed five hits in nine at bats, a record for most hits in a game by a non-starting player which still stands.

On July 16, 1985, Paciorek was traded to the New York Mets in exchange for infielder Dave Cochrane. He spent his final two seasons with the Texas Rangers.

Tom was one of three brothers to play in the majors. His younger brother Jim played for the Milwaukee Brewers in 1987, while older brother John played one game for the Houston Colt .45s in 1963.

== Career statistics ==
Years	Games	PA	AB	R	H	2B	3B	HR	RBI	BB	SO	AVG	OBP	SLG	FLD%
18	1,392	4,465	4,121	494	1,162	232	30	86	503	245	704	.282	.325	.415	.989

Paciorek played 396 games at first base, 23 games at third base, one game at shortstop, 483 games in left field, 74 games in center field and 281 games in right field. His best position was at first base, recording a .994 fielding percentage.

== After baseball ==
Paciorek served as a broadcaster for several years after retiring as a player, with his most notable stint as the color commentator on White Sox television broadcasts alongside Ken Harrelson, who affectionately called him by his baseball nickname, "Wimpy", on-air. Paciorek broadcast for the White Sox from 1988 to 1999, then called selected games for the Detroit Tigers in 2000 and the Seattle Mariners in 2001 before calling the Atlanta Braves on FSN South from 2002 to 2005. In 2006, he was the color commentator for the Washington Nationals, but his contract was not renewed for 2007. He is fondly remembered amongst Nationals fans for his distinct pronunciation of "Alfonso Soriano," a Nationals outfielder that season: "Eelfahnso Soriaahno".

In 1992, Paciorek was inducted into the National Polish-American Sports Hall of Fame.

In the spring of 2002, Paciorek told the Detroit Free Press that priest Gerald Shirilla had molested him and three of his four brothers while working as a teacher at St. Ladislaus High School in Hamtramck in the 1960s. "I was molested by him for a period of four years," Paciorek said. "I would refer to them as attacks. I would say there was at least a hundred of them." Paciorek said he didn't tell anyone because no one would have believed him, saying "When you're a kid, and you're not able to articulate, who's going to believe you?" and "The church back then was so powerful, there's nothing that a kid could do."

In 2016, Paciorek was named to the National College Baseball Hall of Fame.

== See also ==
- List of Washington Nationals broadcasters
