= Larry Burchart =

American baseball player (born 1946)

- Pitcher
- Born: February 8, 1946 (age 80); Tulsa, Oklahoma, U.S.
- Batted: Right Threw: Right

MLB debut
- April 10, 1969, for the Cleveland Indians

Last MLB appearance
- September 30, 1969, for the Cleveland Indians

MLB statistics
- Win–loss record: 0–2
- Earned run average: 4.25
- Strikeouts: 26
- Stats at Baseball Reference

Teams
- Cleveland Indians (1969)

Larry Wayne Burchart (born February 8, 1946) is an American former Major League Baseball pitcher who appeared in 29 games for the 1969 Cleveland Indians.

== College career ==
Burchart was a collegiate All American for Oklahoma State University, leading the Cowboys to two College World Series appearances. The Cowboys finished second in the nation during the 1966 campaign and fifth during the 1967 campaign. Burchart was inducted into the Oklahoma State Athletics Hall of Fame in 1994.

== Professional career ==
The 6 ft 3 in (1.91 m), 205 lb (93 kg) right-hander was selected by the Dodgers in the third round of the secondary phase of the 1967 Major League Baseball draft out of Oklahoma State. He had been drafted the previous June by the Kansas City Athletics, who were unable to sign him. While with the Dodgers, Burchart led the Ogden Dodgers, managed by Tommy Lasorda, to the 1967 Pioneer League championship; Burchart was the winning pitcher in the clinching game, after which Lasorda commented that Burchart was one of the fiercest competitors he'd coached.

After two successful seasons in the Dodger farm system, the Dodgers were unable to protect Burchart from being drafted by the Indians in the 1968 Rule 5 draft. The draft compelled Cleveland to keep Burchart on their Major League roster for the 1969 season or offer him back to the Dodgers. Working as a relief pitcher for the Alvin Dark-led Indians, Burchart allowed 42 hits and 24 bases on balls in 42⅓ innings pitched, with 26 strikeouts and no saves.

Burchart experienced injuries during his 1969 season. He was seriously injured while covering first base against the Boston Red Sox. George Scott of the Red Sox collided with Burchart, which led to the pitcher tearing the muscles of his shoulder and putting him on the disabled list. The Indians sent Burchart to their Triple-A Wichita Aeros affiliate, where he pitched in 1970–1971 before leaving the game.
