= Pete Hamm =

American baseball player (born 1947)

- Pitcher
- Born: September 20, 1947 (age 78); Buffalo, New York, U.S.
- Batted: Right Threw: Right

MLB debut
- July 29, 1970, for the Minnesota Twins

Last MLB appearance
- September 19, 1971, for the Minnesota Twins

MLB statistics
- Win–loss record: 2–6
- Earned run average: 6.41
- Strikeouts: 19
- Stats at Baseball Reference

Teams
- Minnesota Twins (1970–1971)

Peter Whitfield Hamm (born September 20, 1947) is an American former professional baseball pitcher who played from 1970 to 1971 for the Minnesota Twins of Major League Baseball (MLB).
