= Randy Bobb =

American baseball player (1948–1982)

- Catcher
- Born: January 1, 1948; Los Angeles, California, U.S.
- Died: June 13, 1982 (aged 34); Carnelian Bay, California, U.S.
- Batted: Right Threw: Right

MLB debut
- August 15, 1968, for the Chicago Cubs

Last MLB appearance
- September 19, 1969, for the Chicago Cubs

MLB statistics
- Batting average: .100
- Home runs: 0
- Runs batted in: 0
- Stats at Baseball Reference

Teams
- Chicago Cubs (1968–1969)

Mark Randall Bobb (January 1, 1948 – June 13, 1982) was an American right-handed catcher in Major League Baseball for the Chicago Cubs.

Originally drafted by the California Angels in the 3rd round (43rd overall) of the 1966 amateur draft out of Verdugo Hills High School in Tujunga, California, Bobb did not sign, opting to play at Arizona State University. The year of college baseball paid off, as the Chicago Cubs made Bobb the second overall selection in the first round of the June 1967 draft's secondary phase. Bobb made his major league debut just 14 months later, catching the final four innings of an 8-0 Cubs defeat on August 15, 1968. He made his first major league start six days later in the second game of a doubleheader against the Atlanta Braves. His first (and only) major league hit came in the 4th inning, a single off Ron Reed. Bobb appeared in four more games that season with the Cubs and was the eighth-youngest player to appear in the National League in 1968.

Bobb was again called up to the majors in September 1969 as the Cubs were undergoing an historic collapse that would see them lose the division title to the New York Mets. Bobb appeared in three games, going 0-for-2 at the plate. Before the 1970 season, the Cubs traded him to the Mets for 32-year-old catcher J.C. Martin, who would go on to be the Cubs' backup backstop for the next three years. Despite just being 21 years of age, Bobb never returned to the major leagues.

Bobb died on June 13, 1982, following a car accident.
