= Sandy Vance =

American baseball player (born 1947)

- Pitcher
- Born: January 5, 1947 (age 79); Lamar, Colorado, U.S.
- Batted: Right Threw: Right

MLB debut
- April 26, 1970, for the Los Angeles Dodgers

Last MLB appearance
- June 30, 1971, for the Los Angeles Dodgers

MLB statistics
- Win–loss record: 9–8
- Earned run average: 3.83
- Strikeouts: 56
- Stats at Baseball Reference

Teams
- Los Angeles Dodgers (1970–1971)

Gene Covington Vance (born January 5, 1947) is an American former pitcher in Major League Baseball. Drafted in the second round of the June 1968 secondary phase (behind Steve Garvey, first round) he pitched in 30 games in the 1970s for the Los Angeles Dodgers, including 21 starts and 2 complete games. In his first year as a rookie with the Dodgers, he was voted "Dodger Rookie of the Year" for that season with a 7–7 record and the lowest ERA on the Dodger pitchers starting staff. Arm injuries during the 1971 season (2–1 record) eventually forced an early retirement from baseball at age 26 in 1973.

He went to school at Stanford University, graduating "with distinction" (top 15%) with a subsequent graduate degree from California Polytechnic University (Cal Poly Pomona) in Land Planning and Landscape Architecture. While a pitcher at Stanford, he compiled a 32–3 win-loss record in his freshman, sophomore, and junior years, with a perfect 15–0 record (including 4 post season wins in Regional and College World Series play) in his sophomore year, a school record that still stands unbroken. He was subsequently voted into the Stanford Baseball Hall of Fame.

He lives in the San Francisco Bay Area with a 37-year career in land planning and landscape architecture. He is currently a Senior Manager/Planner/Landscape Architect at Kimley-Horn and Associates, Inc., a national multi-disciplinary consulting and design firm in land use, urban planning, civil engineering, traffic/transportation planning, as well as landscape architecture. He designs and lays out new communities and master plans throughout California and in other parts of the world. He continues to give pitching lessons in his spare time to local teens. He and his wife, Dee—former owner of In Place, an all-women move coordinating company—have three children, Ryan (Content Executive for Tonal, a home workout system), Erik (science journalist and associate editor with the New York Times living in Colorado), and Heidi (life and nutrition coach working from Big Sky, Montana)
