= Ron Davini =

American baseball player

- Catcher
- Born: May 5, 1947 (age 79)
- Bats: Right Throws: Right

Ronald Lee Davini (born May 5, 1947) was a catcher who is most notable for winning the 1967 College World Series Most Outstanding Player award while a junior at Arizona State University. He is one of five players from Arizona State University to win that award. The others are Sal Bando, John Dolinsek, Bob Horner and Stan Holmes. Prior to playing collegiately, he attended Anaheim High School.

He was also a Western Athletic Conference All-Star twice (in 1967 and 1968).

== Draft ==
He was drafted four times by big league teams. The first time, he was drafted by the Chicago White Sox in the 20th round of the 1965 amateur draft. He refused that. In 1967, he was drafted in the third round by the New York Yankees. He refused that as well. In 1968, was drafted in the seventh round by the Cleveland Indians, but once again, he refused to sign. Finally, after being drafted by the White Sox again in the first round (20th overall) of the 1969 draft, he did sign. Although he played professionally for five years, he never made it to the majors.

== Professional baseball career ==
In his first year of professional baseball, 1969, he played for the Duluth–Superior Dukes. With them, he hit .276 with four home runs in 66 games. He played for the Appleton Foxes in 1970, hitting .227 with five home runs in 91 games. Playing for the Lynchburg Twins in 1971, he hit .218 with four home runs in 115 games. His average again declined in 1972 as he played for the Tucson Toros. He hit .191 in 48 games. Finally, he played his final professional season in 1973 with the Iowa Oaks, hitting .250 in 24 at-bats.

== Coaching career ==
Since 1992, he has worked for USA Baseball. In 1997, he was selected the USA National Amateur Baseball Coach of the Year and in 2005 he won the National High School Baseball Coach of the Year Award. He also taught and coached at Corona del Sol High School for 28 years, at McClintock High School for six, and Tempe Preparatory Academy for 2. He has recently come out of retirement to help out as the catchers coach and an assistant freshman coach at Corona Del Sol High School for 7 years. In Feb 2020 he retired from coaching baseball.

He was the President of the National High School Baseball Coaches Association in 1997. Now he is serving as its executive director. He was inducted into the National High School Baseball Coaches Association Hall of Fame as well.

In the National Baseball Hall of Fame, he has a spot dedicated to him because of his collegiate accomplishments.
