= Q. V. Lowe =

American baseball player and coach (born 1945)

Q.V. Lowe
Biographical details
- Born: January 15, 1945 (age 81); Red Level, Alabama, U.S.

Q. V. Lowe (born January 15, 1945) is a retired American baseball coach. From 1987 until 2014, he was the men's varsity baseball coach of Auburn Montgomery (also known as Auburn University Montgomery, or AUM) — where he established the baseball program and served for 28 consecutive seasons; he compiled a win–loss record of 1,242–689–5 (.643). He is also a former pitcher, coach and manager in minor league baseball and in 1972, at age 27, spent a season as a full-time coach with the Chicago Cubs of Major League Baseball, working under managers Leo Durocher and Whitey Lockman.

Lowe was born in Red Level, Alabama. He grew up in Ocala, Florida, attended Gulf Coast Community College and graduated from Auburn University. A right-handed pitcher (and hitter), he was listed at 6 ft 1 in (1.85 m) tall and 185 lb (84 kg) during his playing career. In two seasons at Auburn, he won 23 of 26 decisions (.885). He set an Auburn Tigers record for career earned-run average (1.69) and most complete games (ten) in one season. He was selected in the 19th round of the 1967 Major League Baseball draft by the Cubs and compiled a won/lost mark of 24–25 with an ERA of 3.37 in 167 games over five minor-league seasons (1967–71), most of them at the Double-A level. During his final two seasons, he was a player-coach for the San Antonio Missions of the Texas League.

In 1972, Lowe joined the Cubs' coaching staff, serving as bullpen coach. The midyear managerial change, in which Lockman replaced Durocher, resulted in changes on the Cubs' 1973 MLB staff. Lowe returned to the minor leagues as manager of the Rookie-level Gulf Coast Cubs (1973) and the Class A Key West Conchs (for the second half of the 1974 season). Lowe then coached in the New York Yankees' farm system, and also became baseball coach, and eventually athletic director, of Lurleen B. Wallace Community College between 1975–81. He was a full-time pitching instructor in the minor league organizations of the Yankees and Montreal Expos from 1982–85 before joining AUM and launching its baseball program. Lowe also remained in professional baseball as a pitching coach for Short Season teams in the Montreal system, and spent one season, 1992, as manager of the Jamestown Expos of the New York–Penn League.

At AUM, he led his team to the NAIA World Series three times, and coached 35 NAIA All-Americans. Career honors include membership in the Auburn Tigers Walk of Fame and the Alabama Baseball Coaches Hall of Fame.

QV, whose nickname is simply "Q", has no middle name. His first name is the two upper-case letters "QV".

== See also ==
- List of college baseball career coaching wins leaders
