= Scott Reid (baseball) =

American baseball player, scout, and executive (1947–2021)

- Outfielder
- Born: January 7, 1947; Chicago, Illinois, U.S.
- Died: June 29, 2021 (aged 74); Phoenix, Arizona, U.S.
- Batted: Left Threw: Right

MLB debut
- September 10, 1969, for the Philadelphia Phillies

Last MLB appearance
- September 29, 1970, for the Philadelphia Phillies

MLB statistics
- Batting average: .147
- Home runs: 0
- Runs batted in: 1
- Hits: 10
- Runs: 10
- Stats at Baseball Reference

Teams
- Philadelphia Phillies (1969–1970)

Scott Donald Reid (January 7, 1947 – June 29, 2021) was an American baseball outfielder who played two seasons in Major League Baseball (MLB). He appeared in 38 games for the Philadelphia Phillies from 1969 to 1970. He went on to serve as a major league scout or executive for over 40 years, most recently for the Detroit Tigers from 2002 to 2020.

== Early life ==
Reid was born in Chicago on January 7, 1947. He attended El Rancho High School in Pico Rivera, California. He initially studied at Cerritos College in Norwalk, California, before transferring to Arizona State University. Including the "secondary phase" and January drafts at the time, Reid was selected four times during the first three years of the MLB amateur draft, 1965 through 1967, including twice by the New York Mets. Finally, the Phillies drafted him in the second round of the secondary phase of the 1967 Major League Baseball draft on June 6. He ultimately signed a contract and entered professional baseball just under a month later.

== Playing career ==
Reid played two seasons in the minor leagues from 1967 to 1969. He made his MLB debut on September 10, 1969, at the age of 22, entering as a pinch hitter, drawing a walk in his only plate appearance, and scoring a run in a 6–2 win over the Chicago Cubs. In three separate stints on the Phillies' major league roster, Reid served as a pinch hitter and started 15 games in the outfield, 14 of them as a center fielder. He collected ten hits, including one double, and scored ten runs. He posted a batting average of .147 with one run batted in. He played his final major league game on September 29, 1970, at the age of 23. For the rest of his playing career, Reid played mostly for Triple-A teams, including the Eugene Emeralds in 1971 and 1973, and the Tidewater Tides and the Syracuse Chiefs in 1972.

== Scouting career ==
Reid began his scouting career with the Phillies in 1973. He also served as scouting director for the Chicago Cubs in 1986 and 1987. He was one of the early hires in the Florida Marlins front office as a Major League scout in 1992, which is where he met Al Avila and former Tigers general manager Dave Dombrowski. Reid became an assistant to Dombrowski with the Marlins in 1999 and was promoted to vice president a few months later. When Dombrowski joined the Detroit Tigers before the 2002 season, he brought Reid with him as part of his inner circle of advisers, with Avila eventually joining them. He worked for the Tigers as a scouting director, adviser and vice president of player personnel for 18 years.

== Personal life ==
Reid was married to his wife Sherry until his death. Together, they had two children: Brian and Lindsay. Brian followed in his father's footsteps and became a scout for the Tigers and Mets.

Reid died June 29, 2021, at the age of 74.
