= Rider Broncs baseball =

Rider Broncs
- 2026 Rider Broncs baseball team
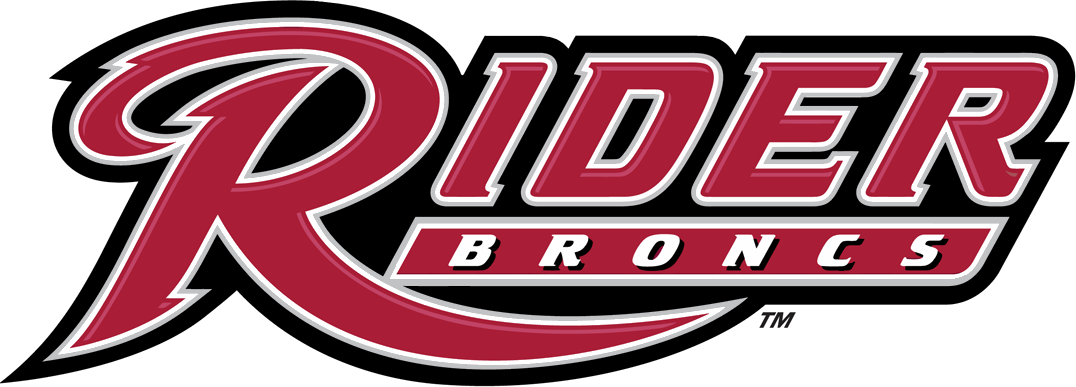
- University: Rider University
- Head coach: Lee Lipinski (2nd season)
- Conference: MAAC
- Location: Lawrenceville, New Jersey
- Home stadium: Sonny Pittaro Field (capacity: 2,000)
- Nickname: Broncs
- Colors: Cranberry, white, and gray

College World Series appearances
- 1967

NCAA tournament appearances
- 1967, 1984, 1985, 1986, 1987, 1988, 1989, 1991, 1992, 1994, 2008, 2010, 2021, 2023, 2026

Conference tournament champions
- NEC: 1994, 1995, 1996; MAAC: 2008, 2010, 2021, 2023, 2026

Conference regular season champions
- 2013, 2015, 2025, 2026

The Rider Broncs baseball team is a varsity intercollegiate athletic team of Rider University in Lawrenceville, New Jersey, United States. The team is a member of the Metro Atlantic Athletic Conference, which is part of the NCAA Division I. The team plays its home games at Sonny Pittaro Field in Lawrenceville, New Jersey. The Broncs are led by head coach by Lee Lipinski.

== Rider in the NCAA tournament ==
Year	Record	Pct	Notes
1967	4–2	.667	College World Series 5th Place, District 2 champions
1984	0–2	.000	Northeast Regional
1985	1–2	.333	East Regional
1986	1–2	.333	Northeast Regional
1987	3–2	.600	Northeast Regional
1989	0–2	.000	Atlantic Regional
1991	0–2	.000	Midwest Regional
1992	0–2	.000	East Regional
1994	0–2	.000	Atlantic I Regional
2008	0–2	.000	Fullerton Regional
2010	0–2	.000	Austin Regional
2021	0–2	.000	Ruston Regional
2023	1–2	.333	Conway Regional
2026	0–2	.000	Gainesville Regional
TOTALS	10–28	.263	

== MLB players ==
Debut Year	Position	Name	First Team	Notes
1944	RP	Al Verdel	Philadelphia Phillies	
1961	SP	Al Downing	New York Yankees	1967 All-Star, 1971 Comeback Player of the Year
1965	LF	Danny Napoleon	New York Mets	
1984	SS	Jeff Kunkel	Texas Rangers	Drafted 3rd overall in 1983, Rider's highest draft pick
1988	SP	Jack Armstrong	Cincinnati Reds	Drafted 18th overall in 1987, 1990 All-Star
1989	3B	Ed Whited	Atlanta Braves	Drafted in 18th round by Astros in 1986
2006	RP	Jim Hoey	Baltimore Orioles	Drafted in 13th round in 2003
2006	RP	Kevin Barry	Atlanta Braves	Drafted in 14th round in 2001
2019	SP	Nick Margevicius	San Diego Padres	Drafted in 7th round in 2017

== See also ==
- List of NCAA Division I baseball programs
- College baseball
