= Auburn Tigers baseball =

Baseball team representing Auburn University

- 2026 Auburn Tigers baseball team
- Founded: 1895 (130 years ago)
- Overall record: 1,914–1,282–6 (.598)
- University: Auburn University
- Athletic director: John Cohen
- Head coach: Butch Thompson (11th season)
- Conference: SEC
- Location: Auburn, Alabama
- Home stadium: Plainsman Park (capacity: 6,300)
- Nickname: Tigers
- Colors: Burnt orange and navy blue

College World Series appearances
- 1967, 1976, 1994, 1997, 2019, 2022

NCAA regional champions
- 1976, 1994, 1997, 1999, 2018, 2019, 2022, 2025, 2026

NCAA tournament appearances
- 1963, 1967, 1976, 1978, 1987, 1989, 1993, 1994, 1995, 1997, 1998, 1999, 2000, 2001, 2002, 2003, 2005, 2010, 2015, 2017, 2018, 2019, 2022, 2023, 2025, 2026

Conference tournament champions
- 1978, 1989, 1998

Conference regular season champions
- 1905, 1916, 1920, 1928, 1931, 1937, 1958, 1963, 1967, 1976, 1978

The Auburn Tigers baseball is the team that represents Auburn University in NCAA Division I college baseball. Along with most of the other Auburn athletic teams, the baseball team currently participates in the Southeastern Conference. The Tigers play their home games on campus at Plainsman Park, and they are coached by Butch Thompson.

== History ==
Auburn Baseball has won six SEC championships, three SEC Tournament championships, appeared in 25 NCAA Regionals, and reached the College World Series (CWS) six times.

Following the 2000 season, Hal Baird retired as head coach. After 16 years as head of the Auburn baseball program, Baird posted an impressive 634–328 overall record.

On September 1, 1999, it was announced that Steve Renfroe was named head baseball coach at Auburn University, as the successor to Hal Baird following the 2000 season. Renfroe was longtime assistant coach at Auburn before being named head coach, having begun his coaching career at Auburn in 1981 as an assistant and remaining in that position until 1995 when he was named assistant head coach.

On June 7, 2004, Renfroe was relieved of his duties as head baseball coach at Auburn. He posted an overall mark of 145–92, including a 60–60 SEC record, during his tenure. Each of Renfroe's first three Auburn squads advanced to the NCAA Baseball Tournaments, with stops in Tallahassee, FL, in 2001, Tuscaloosa, AL, in 2002, and hosting a 2003 Regional in Auburn.

On June 29, 2004, Tom Slater was named as Steve Renfroe's replacement. After only having 2 coaches in 38 years, Auburn was now on the second coach within a five-year period. Slater was previously an assistant at Auburn during the 1990s before taking a head coaching job at his alma mater Virginia Military Institute following the 2000 season. After the 2003 season, Slater left VMI to take an assistant job at the University of Florida where he helped lead the Gators to their first ever Super Regional appearance.

On June 20, 2008, John Pawlowski was introduced as the 16th Head Coach of the Auburn Tigers baseball program. Pawlowski was previously the head coach at the College of Charleston. He took over that program in 2000, and posted a 338–192–1 record during his tenure. Under his direction, the Cougars made three straight NCAA post-season appearances, including their first ever appearance in 2004. He was named the Southern Conference coach of the year in 2004, 2005, and 2007, and coached 17 All-Americans during his tenure. At Auburn, he took over a very young baseball team that included two freshman all-American selections, Hunter Morris and Brian Fletcher.

Tigers baseball players during a game in 2010

On May 27, 2013, John Pawlowski was fired after finishing the 2013 season with a 33–23 record overall and a 13–17 record in the SEC. The Tigers failed to reach the NCAA tournament for three straight years. Pawlowski compiled a 167–126 overall record and a 71–79 SEC mark at Auburn. His 2010 team won the SEC West, but his four other teams had losing conference records.

== Stadium ==
=== Plainsman Park ===
Samford Stadium-Hitchcock Field at Plainsman Park is a baseball stadium located in Auburn, Alabama. It is the home field for the Auburn Tigers baseball team. Commonly known as "Plainsman Park", it is widely considered one of the finest facilities in college baseball and has a seating capacity of 4,096 not including lawn areas.

The field was named in 1997 to honor two former Auburn players, Billy and Jimmy Hitchcock. The Hitchcock brothers were popular athletes in the 1930s. Jimmy was Auburn's first All-American in football and baseball, and later coached the Tigers during the 1940s. Billy helped Auburn make its first bowl appearance in football, as well as, helping the Tigers claim their first SEC baseball title in 1937. He later became a manager in the MLB.

In 2003, the stadium was renamed Samford Stadium-Hitchcock Field at Plainsman Park after W. James "Jimmy" Samford passed. Samford was a graduate of Auburn, a former board of trustees member, and was known for pushing the renovations of the stadium that began in 1996.

In the 2026 Auburn Regional Final on June 1, 2026 versus Milwaukee, a new attendance record of 8,228 was set at Plainsman Park.

== Head coaches ==
Records are through the 2024 season

Tenure	Coach	Seasons	Won–loss record	Winning pct.	NCAA tournaments
1933	Sam J. McAllister	1	5–4	.556	
1934	William Herschel Bobo	1			
1934–1939	Dell Morgan	6			
1940	Porter Grant	1	4–5	.444	
1941–1942	Jimmy Hitchcock	2			
1943–1946	Bob K. Evans	2			
1947–1948	Danny Doyle	2			
1949–1950	Johnny Williamson	2	21–23	.477	
1951–1957	Dick McGowen	7	90–76–2	.548	
1958	Joe Connally	1	17–8	.680	
1959–1962	Erk Russell	4	59–37–1	.620	
1963–1984	Paul Nix	22	515–376	.578	4
1985–2000	Hal Baird	16	634–328	.659	9
2001–2004	Steve Renfroe	4	145–92	.612	3
2005–2008	Tom Slater	4	115–113	.504	1
2009–2013	John Pawlowski	5	167–126	.570	1
2014–2015	Sunny Golloway	2	62–50	.553	1
2016–present	Butch Thompson	10	306–221–1	.581	5
Totals	18 coaches	86			24

== Year-by-year results ==
*Through 2024 season.
*Final rankings are from Collegiate Baseball Division I Final Polls (1959–2006) *Auburn baseball history year-by-year results

Year-by-year results
Year	Coach	Record	Notes
1933	Sam McAllister		
1934	Herschel Bobo	10-8-1	
1935	Del Morgan		
1936	Del Morgan	13-5	
1937	Del Morgan		
1938	Del Morgan		
1939	Del Morgan		
1940	Porter Grant		
1941	Jimmy Hitchcock	12-11-1	
1942	Jimmy Hitchcock	10-8	
1943	Bob Evans	8-3	
1944	Bob Evans		
1945	Bob Evans		
1946	Bob Evans		
1947	Danny Doyle		
1948	Danny Doyle		
1949	Johnny Williamson	9–10	
1950	Johnny Williamson	12–13	
1951	Dan McGowen	14–11	
1952	Dan McGowen	13–11–2	
1953	Dan McGowen	9–12	
1954	Dan McGowen	17–5	
1955	Dan McGowen	9–16	
1956	Dan McGowen	12–11	
1957	Dan McGowen	16–10	
1958	Joe Connally	17–8	SEC Champions
1959	Erk Russell	15–11–1	
1960	Erk Russell	15–8	
1961	Erk Russell	14–11	SEC East Champions
1962	Erk Russell	15–7	
1963	Paul Nix	17–8	SEC Champions, Lost to Florida State in Gastonia Regional
1964	Paul Nix	21–7	SEC East Champions
1965	Paul Nix	13–7	SEC East Champions
1966	Paul Nix	14–12	
1967	Paul Nix	31–10	College World Series (4th place), SEC Champions
1968	Paul Nix	22–12	
1969	Paul Nix	20–17	
1970	Paul Nix	17–16	
1971	Paul Nix	23–16	
1972	Paul Nix	18–17	
1973	Paul Nix	20–17	
1974	Paul Nix	31–13	
1975	Paul Nix	24–21	
1976	Paul Nix	37–15	College World Series (8th place), SEC Champions
1977	Paul Nix	28–18	
1978	Paul Nix	33–21	SEC Champions, SEC Tournament champions, Lost to Memphis in Auburn Regional
1979	Paul Nix	21–21	
1980	Paul Nix	27–24	SEC West Champions
1981	Paul Nix	27–27	
1982	Paul Nix	27–20–1	
1983	Paul Nix	16–34	
1984	Paul Nix	27–24	
1985	Hal Baird	30–22	
1986	Hal Baird	31–24	
1987	Hal Baird	24–18	Lost to Clemson in Huntsville Regional
1988	Hal Baird	39–16	
1989	Hal Baird	44–20	SEC Tournament champions, Lost to Clemson in Tallahassee Regional
1990	Hal Baird	34–24	
1991	Hal Baird	35–24	
1992	Hal Baird	30–25	
1993	Hal Baird	40–23	Lost to NC State in Stillwater Regional
1994	Hal Baird	44–21	College World Series (8th place)
1995	Hal Baird	50–13	Lost to Oklahoma in Oklahoma City Super Regional
1996	Hal Baird	32–24	
1997	Hal Baird	50–17	College World Series (6th place)
1998	Hal Baird	46–18	Lost to Florida State in Tallahassee Super Regional
1999	Hal Baird	46–19	Lost to Florida State in Tallahassee Super Regional
2000	Hal Baird	41–20	Lost to Stetson in Atlanta Regional, Baird retired following the 2000 season
2001	Steve Renfroe	37–21	Lost to Florida State in Tallahassee Regional
2002	Steve Renfroe	34–23	
2003	Steve Renfroe	44–21	Lost to Ohio State in Columbus Regional
2004	Steve Renfroe	32–24	Steve Renfroe fired after season
2005	Tom Slater	34–26	Lost to Florida St. in Tallahassee Regional Final
2006	Tom Slater	22–34	
2007	Tom Slater	31–25	
2008	Tom Slater	28–28	Tom Slater resigned after the season
2009	John Pawlowski	31–25	John Pawlowski hired in off-season
2010	John Pawlowski	43–21	Lost to Clemson in Auburn Regional Final
2011	John Pawlowski	29–29	
2012	John Pawlowski	31–28	
2013	John Pawlowski	33–23	John Pawlowski fired after season
2014	Sunny Golloway	28–28	Sunny Golloway hired on June 14, 2013.
2015	Sunny Golloway	36–26	Golloway was fired following the 2015 season.
2016	Butch Thompson	23–33	Butch Thompson was hired on October 22, 2015
2017	Butch Thompson	37–26	Lost to Florida St. in Tallahassee Regional final, June 5, 2017.
2018	Butch Thompson	43–23	Lost to Florida in Gainesville Super Regional
2019	Butch Thompson	38–26	College World Series (7th Place)
2020	Butch Thompson	13–5	*season cancelled before SEC play
2021	Butch Thompson	25–27	
2022	Butch Thompson	43–21	College World Series (5th Place)
2023	Butch Thompson	34–23–1	Lost to Southern Miss in Auburn Regional
2024	Butch Thompson	27–26	

== Auburn Tigers in the NCAA tournament ==
Since the NCAA Division I baseball tournament began in 1947, the Auburn Tigers have played in it 24 times and made it to the College World Series six times.

Year	Record	Pct	Notes
1963			
1967			College World Series (4th place)
1976	3–2	.600	Won the South Regional in Tallahassee; College World Series (8th place)
1978			
1987			
1989			
1993			
1994			College World Series (8th place)
1995			
1997			College World Series (6th place)
1998	3–2	.600	Runner-up in the Tallahassee Regional.
1999	3–3	.500	Won the Auburn Regional; Lost to Florida St. in the Tallahassee Super Regional.
2000	1–2	.333	Eliminated by Stetson in the Atlanta Regional.
2001	2–2	.500	Eliminated by Florida St. in the Tallahassee Regional final.
2002	0–2	.000	Lost to Florida Atlantic and Alabama in the Tuscaloosa Regional.
2003	2–2	.500	Eliminated by Ohio St. in the Auburn Regional final.
2005	2–2	.500	Eliminated by Florida St. in the Tallahassee Regional final.
2010	3–2	.600	Eliminated by Clemson in the Auburn Regional final.
2015	1–2	.333	Eliminated by College of Charleston in the Tallahassee Regional semi-final.
2017	2–2	.500	Eliminated by Florida St. in the Tallahassee Regional final.
2018	3–0	1.000	Winner of Raleigh Regional. Eliminated by Florida Gators in the Gainesville Super Regional.
2019	5–3	.625	Winner of Atlanta Regional. Defeated North Carolina in the Chapel Hill Super Regional; College World Series (7th Place)
2022	5–1	.833	Winner of Auburn Regional. Defeated Oregon State in the Corvallis Super Regional; College World Series (5th Place)
2023	0–2	.000	Eliminated by Southern Miss in the Auburn Regional.
2025	3–2	.600	Winner of Auburn Regional. Eliminated by Coastal Carolina in the Auburn Super Regional.
2026	4–3	.571	Winner of Auburn Regional. Eliminated by Ole Miss in Auburn Super Regional.
TOTALS			

== Auburn's first-team All-Americans ==
Player	Position	Year(s)	Selectors
Larry Nichols	Third Base	1962†	ABCA
Q.V. Lowe	Pitcher	1967†	ABCA
Gregg Olson	Pitcher	1987†, 1988†	ABCA, BA
Frank Thomas	First Base	1989†	ABCA, BA
John Powell	Pitcher	1993	BA
Jay Waggoner	First Base	1994	NCBWA
Mark Bellhorn	Shortstop	1995	ABCA
Ryan Halla	Pitcher	1995	ABCA, NCBWA
Tim Hudson	Pitcher	1997†	ABCA, BA, CB, NCBWA
Todd Faulkner	First Base	2000†	ABCA, BA, CB, NCBWA
Gabe Gross	Outfield	2000†	ABCA, BA, CB, NCBWA, LS
Steve Register	Pitcher	2003	NCBWA
Hunter Morris	First Base	2010†	ABCA, BA, & NCBWA
Casey Mize	Pitcher	2018†	ABCA, BA, NCBWA, PG
Ryan Bliss	Shortstop	2021	NCBWA
Sonny DiChiara	First Base	2022	ABCA, BA
Ike Irish	Catcher / OF	2025†	ABCA, BA, CB, D1, PG
Source:"SEC All-Americas". secsports.com. Archived from the original on May 28, 2008. ABCA: American Baseball Coaches Association BA: Baseball America CB: Collegiate Baseball NCBWA: National Collegiate Baseball Writers Association LS: Louisville Slugger † Denotes consensus All-American

== Player awards ==
=== National awards ===
- Rotary Smith Award

Tim Hudson (1997)

- Collegiate Baseball Freshman of the Year Award

Hayden Gliemmo (1998)
Pat Duke (1958)

- Auburn 1st All-American

=== SEC Awards ===
- Player of the Year Award

Tim Hudson (1997)
Hunter Morris (2010)

- Freshman of the Year Award

Hunter Morris (2008)

== Coaches awards ==
=== SEC Awards ===
- SEC Coach of the Year

Dell Morgan (1937)
Joe Connally (1958)
Paul Nix (1963, 1967, 1976, 1978)
