= List of Arizona State University alumni =

This is a list of notable alumni of Arizona State University.

== Academia ==
The list of ASU alumni in academia includes academic administrators as well as academics in the fields of business, education, the humanities and social sciences.

== Arts and media ==
The list of ASU alumni in arts and media includes the fields of art (including architecture and photography), entertainment, journalism, literature and music.

== Athletes ==
The list of ASU athletes includes players on ASU varsity sports programs. Some programs with many alumni have their own lists:

- Baseball
- Basketball
- Football
- Golf
- Swim and dive
- Track and field

== Business ==
Business
Name	Class year	Notes	Ref.
Michael J. Ahearn	(BS, JD)	CEO of First Solar and company director	
Robert Bigelow		Hotel and aerospace entrepreneur	
Michael R. Burns		Vice chairman of Lionsgate Entertainment Corp.	
James Chippendale		Business executive	
Chris Cohan	1973	Founder of Sonic Communications, former owner of the Golden State Warriors	
Chris Cookson	1970	President of Sony Pictures Technologies	
Chris Cottrell		Businessman	
Louis E. Crandall		Founder of Legend City	
Diana Yazzie Devine	1999 (MBA)	Nonprofit manager	
Fred DuVal	(JD)	Political consultant, businessman, member and chair of the Arizona Board of Regents	
Vince Ferraro	(MBA)	Executive for Hewlett-Packard and Eastman Kodak	
Randall C. Fowler	1965 (MSE)	Inventor	
Ira A. Fulton	—N/a	Businessman, founder of Fulton Homes (attended)	
Kara Goldin	1989	Businesswoman	
Barbara Grant		Executive at IBM and CEO of Siros Technologies	
Christian Hageseth		Cannabis entrepreneur	
Robert Hecht-Nielsen	1971	Businessman, computer developer and adjunct professor of electrical and computer engineering, University of California, San Diego	
Chad Horstman	2001	Co-founder of Yandy.com	
Todd Huffman	2006 (MS)	Co-founder of 3Scan, inventor, photographer	
Vani Kola	1987	Entrepreneur and venture capitalist in India	
Howard Lindzon	1991 (MBA)	Author and founder of StockTwits	
Rex Maughan	1962	Founder and CEO of Forever Living Products, a multi-level marketing company	
T. Allan McArtor	1971 (MSE)	Aviation executive	
Ioanna Morfessis	1996 (PhD)	Economic development leader	
Paige Mycoskie		Founder of the fashion brand Aviator Nation	
Cheryl Najafi		Entrepreneur	
Murugan Pal	(MS)	Entrepreneur and software developer	
Joe Shoen	1981 (JD)	Chairman of Amerco; chairman and president of U-Haul	
Andy Spade		Co-founder of Kate Spade New York	
Kate Spade	1985	Fashion designer, business owner; co-founder of Kate Spade New York	
Kim Taylor	2005	Entrepreneur	
Gary L. Tooker	1962	Corporate executive	
Ryan Wood	1996	Football player, co-founder of Under Armour	

== Coaches and athletic administrators ==
Coaches and athletic administrators
Name	Class year	Notes	Ref.
Grant Anders	2019 (MSLB)	Major League Baseball development coach	
Pete Babcock		Basketball executive	
Sandra Baldwin	1962 (Note: Baldwin previously claimed to have received a doctorate from ASU in 1967, which was inaccurate and led to her resignation from the USOC.)	President of the United States Olympic Committee, 2000–2002	
Jim Brock		Baseball coach and two-time national champion in 23 seasons at ASU	
Greg Byrne	1994	Athletic director	
Mike Candrea	1978	Coached Arizona Wildcats softball for 36 seasons to eight national titles and retired as the all-time winningest coach in college softball; coached Olympic softball	
Gary Close	1978	Assistant college basketball coach at Stanford, Iowa and Wisconsin	
Loren Dawson	1993	College and high school football coach	
Kenny Dillingham	2013	Head coach of ASU football, 2023–	
Bobby Douglas	1980 (MA)	Wrestler and wrestling coach at Arizona State and Iowa State	
Herman Frazier	1977	Track athlete and Olympic gold medalist; graduate assistant and ASU athletic director, later of the University of Alabama at Birmingham, University of Hawaiʻi at Mānoa and Syracuse University	
Kathy Gibbons	1980 (MS)	Distance runner and cross country and track and field coach at the University of Colorado	
David Griffin	1995	Basketball executive	
Derrick Hall	1991	President and CEO of the Arizona Diamondbacks	
Kyle Hawkins		Lacrosse coach	
Barbara Hedges		Athletic director at USC and Washington	
Jonathan Kolb		Basketball executive	
George McCaskey	1978	Chairman of the Chicago Bears	
Aaron McCreary	1915	Athletic director and coach at Arizona State College at Tempe, 1923–1931; athletic director and coach at Arizona State Teachers College (now Northern Arizona University), 1931–1963	
Jim Phillips	1992 (MPA)	Commissioner of the Atlantic Coast Conference	
Greg Powers	1999	ASU men's ice hockey head coach, 2010–2026	
Graham Rossini	2002	ASU athletic director, 2024–	
Joel Sobotka	1993	College and high school basketball coach	
Gene Taylor	1980	Athletic director at Kansas State University	
Bobby Valentine	—N/a	Baseball manager; attended courses at ASU while playing for the Los Angeles Dodgers	
Linda Vollstedt	1969	ASU women's golf coach, 1980–2001	
Kevin Warren	1988 (MBA)	President of the Chicago Bears, commissioner of the Big Ten Conference	
Ralph Weekly	1973	Softball coach at Pacific Lutheran, Chattanooga, and Tennessee; Team USA coach	
Sam Winningham	(MA)	Football coach at Valley State College (now California State University, Northridge), professor	

== Government and politics ==
The list of ASU alumni in government and politics includes federal legislators and people in other federal offices; people in Arizona statewide offices, the Arizona Legislature, and other Arizona offices; people in government offices in states other than Arizona, tribal governments, and internationally; and social activists.

== Law ==
Law
Name	Class year	Notes	Ref.
Tom Ajamie	1982	Trial lawyer	
Samuel Alba	1972 (JD)	U.S. magistrate judge	
Claudeen Arthur	JD (1974)	Chief justice of the Supreme Court of the Navajo Nation	
Raymond D. Austin	1979	Associate justice of the Supreme Court of the Navajo Nation	
Bridget S. Bade	1987	Judge of the U.S. Court of Appeals for the Ninth Circuit	
Michael G. Bailey		United States attorney for the District of Arizona	
Lenni Benson	1980	Chaired professor at the New York Law School, founded the Safe Passage Project	
Rebecca White Berch	1976	Justice of the Arizona Supreme Court	
Bonnie A. Bulla	1984	Judge of the Nevada Court of Appeals	
Tena Campbell		Senior judge, U.S. District Court for the District of Utah	
Heather Clah	2005 (JD)	Attorney general of Navajo Nation	
Joshua Deahl	2003	Associate judge of the District of Columbia Court of Appeals	
Sarah D. Grant	1970 (JD)	Judge, Arizona Court of Appeals, Division 1	
Michael Daly Hawkins	1967	Senior judge, U.S. Court of Appeals for the Ninth Circuit	
Brad Hendricks		Attorney	
Randall M. Howe	1985	Judge of the Arizona Court of Appeals, Division 1	
Natalie Hudson	1979	Chief justice of the Minnesota Supreme Court	
Diane Humetewa	1987	Judge, U.S. District Court for the District of Arizona; first American Indian woman to serve as a federal judge	
Janine M. Kern	1982	Associate justice of the South Dakota Supreme Court	
Michael T. Liburdi	1998	Judge, U.S. District Court for the District of Arizona	
John Lopez IV	1998 (JD)	Vice chief justice of the Arizona Supreme Court	
Juan Martinez	(JD)	Attorney and Maricopa County homicide prosecutor	
Mari Matsuda	1975	Lawyer and law professor	
Ruth McGregor	1974 (JD)	Chief justice of the Arizona Supreme Court	
Gloria Navarro	1992 (JD)	Judge, U.S. District Court for the District of Nevada	
Hugh R. O'Connell		Wisconsin circuit court judge; Milwaukee County district attorney	
Douglas L. Rayes	1975	Senior judge, U.S. District Court for the District of Arizona	
Craig Rothfeld		Prison consultant	
Jim Rossi		Law professor	
Michael D. Ryan	1977 (JD)	Associate justice of the Arizona Supreme Court	
Roslyn O. Silver	1971 (JD)	Senior judge, U.S. District Court for the District of Arizona	
Barry G. Silverman	1973	Senior judge, U.S. Court of Appeals for the Ninth Circuit	
James A. Soto	1971	Senior judge, U.S. District Court for the District of Arizona	
Ann Timmer	1985 (JD)	Chief justice of the Arizona Supreme Court	
John J. Tuchi	1994 (JD)	Judge, U.S. District Court for the District of Arizona	
Jerod E. Tufte	2002 (JD)	Justice of the North Dakota Supreme Court	
Jason Vanacour	2003 (JD)	Lawyer and former soccer player	
Neil V. Wake	1971	Senior judge, U.S. District Court for the District of Arizona	
Pamela Scott Washington		District court judge in Alaska	
Claudette White	2005 (JD)	Chief justice for the San Manuel Band of Mission Indians and member of Quechan Tribal Council	
Harvey Whittemore	(JD)	Lawyer in Nevada	
Mabel Walker Willebrandt	1911	U.S. assistant attorney general, 1921–1929, known as the "First Lady of Law"	
David Yerushalmi	1984 (JD)	Lawyer for the American Freedom Law Center	

== Military ==
Military
Name	Class year	Notes	Ref.
William P. Acker	1959 (MA)	U.S. Air Force major general	
John J. Batbie Jr.	1973	U.S. Air Force major general	
Stanley C. Beck	—N/a	U.S. Air Force major general (attended)	
Shawn Bratton	1993	U.S. Space Force general	
Philip M. Breedlove	1991 (MS)	U.S. Air Force four-star general	
Ryan Cleckner	2008	Army sniper, veterans activist	
John F. Goodman	1970	U.S. Marine Corps three-star general	
Terry Holdbrooks		Guard at Guantanamo Bay detention camp	
John C. Keegan	1975	Army soldier and Naval Reserve commander; justice of the peace, Arizona state representative	
Robert Maloy	—N/a	U.S. Air Force major general (attended)	
John L. Piotrowski	—N/a	U.S. Air Force four-star general (attended)	
Michael A. Ryan	1981	U.S. Army brigadier general	
Jeremy Staat	2009	U.S. Marine Corps, served in Iraq; football player, drafted 1998	
Pat Tillman	1997	U.S. Army Rangers corporal (posthumous promotion following 2004 fratricide in Operation Enduring Freedom); NFL Cardinals starting safety (1998–2001)	
Margaret H. Woodward	1982	U.S. Air Force major general	
Daniel Yoo	1980	U.S. Marine Corps, commander of MARSOC	

== Science and technology ==
The list of ASU alumni in arts and media includes the fields of mathematics, medicine, engineering, science, and technology.

== Miscellaneous ==
Miscellaneous
Name	Class year	Notes	Ref.
Brittany Bell	2009	Miss Arizona USA winner	
Eric Bennett	2006 (M.Ed.)	Paralympic archer	
Korban Best	—N/a	Track medalist at the 2024 Summer Paralympics (attended)	
Billy Boat		Racing driver	
Shan Boodram	(MS)	Sexologist	
Martin Boonzaayer	(MA)	Judoka and real estate agent	
Shona Brownlee		British para athlete	
Emma Broyles	2024	Miss America 2022	
Nestor Ceja		Major League Baseball umpire	
Hailey Davidson	2014	Golfer	
Clarence Dixon	—N/a	Convicted murderer (attended)	
Allison DuBois		Psychic	
Robelyn Garcia	2011 (MS)	Basketball player, metaphysical practitioner	
Jessica Hardy	2016	2012 Olympic medalist in swimming	
Ariana Hilborn	2003	Distance runner	
Scott Hogsett		Wheelchair rugby player	
David Imonitie	(MS)	Nigerian tennis player	
Peter M. Johnson	(PhD)	First African-American man named a general authority seventy in the LDS Church	
Steven Jones		Professional poker player	
Laura Lawless	2005 (JD)	Miss Arizona 2002	
Mary Kay Letourneau	—N/a	Convicted child rapist (attended)	
Kevin Nee	2007	Professional strongman	
Scott Peterson	—N/a	Convicted murderer (attended)	
Mohammed Qahtani		Public speaker	
Frank Shankwitz	—N/a	Co-founder of the Make-A-Wish Foundation (attended)	
Jimmy Siemers		Professional water skier, two-time world champion	
Benny Silman		Bookmaker involved in a point shaving scandal in ASU men's basketball in 1994	
David Spangler	—N/a	Spiritual philosopher (attended)	
Taylor Swanson	2016	Paralympic track and field athlete	
Elizabeth Ursic	2010	Theologian and scholar	
James S. Wall		Bishop of the Roman Catholic Diocese of Gallup	
Alena Analeigh Wicker	2023	Youngest Black person accepted into medical school and youngest person to intern at NASA	
Elizabeth Williams	2024 (MS)	Professional basketball player	
Chris Young	2022	Professional baseball outfielder and TV analyst	
