= List of Arizona State Sun Devils basketball players =

Arizona State University (ASU) has graduated a number of athletes. This includes graduates, non-graduate former students and current students of ASU who are notable for their achievements within athletics, sometimes before or after their time at ASU. Athletes in other sports can be found in the list of Arizona State University athletes; other alumni, including non-playing coaches and athletic administrators, can be found in the list of Arizona State University alumni.

The first ASU intercollegiate men's basketball team began play in 1912; though women's teams representing ASU had played as early as the 1890s, women's basketball was not a sponsored intercollegiate sport at ASU until 1975. As of 2025, 30 ASU alumni have played in the National Basketball Association (NBA), including Joe Caldwell, Ike Diogu, Lionel Hollins, James Harden, Eddie House, Fat Lever, Alton Lister, and Byron Scott. Several more have played in the Women's National Basketball Association (WNBA).

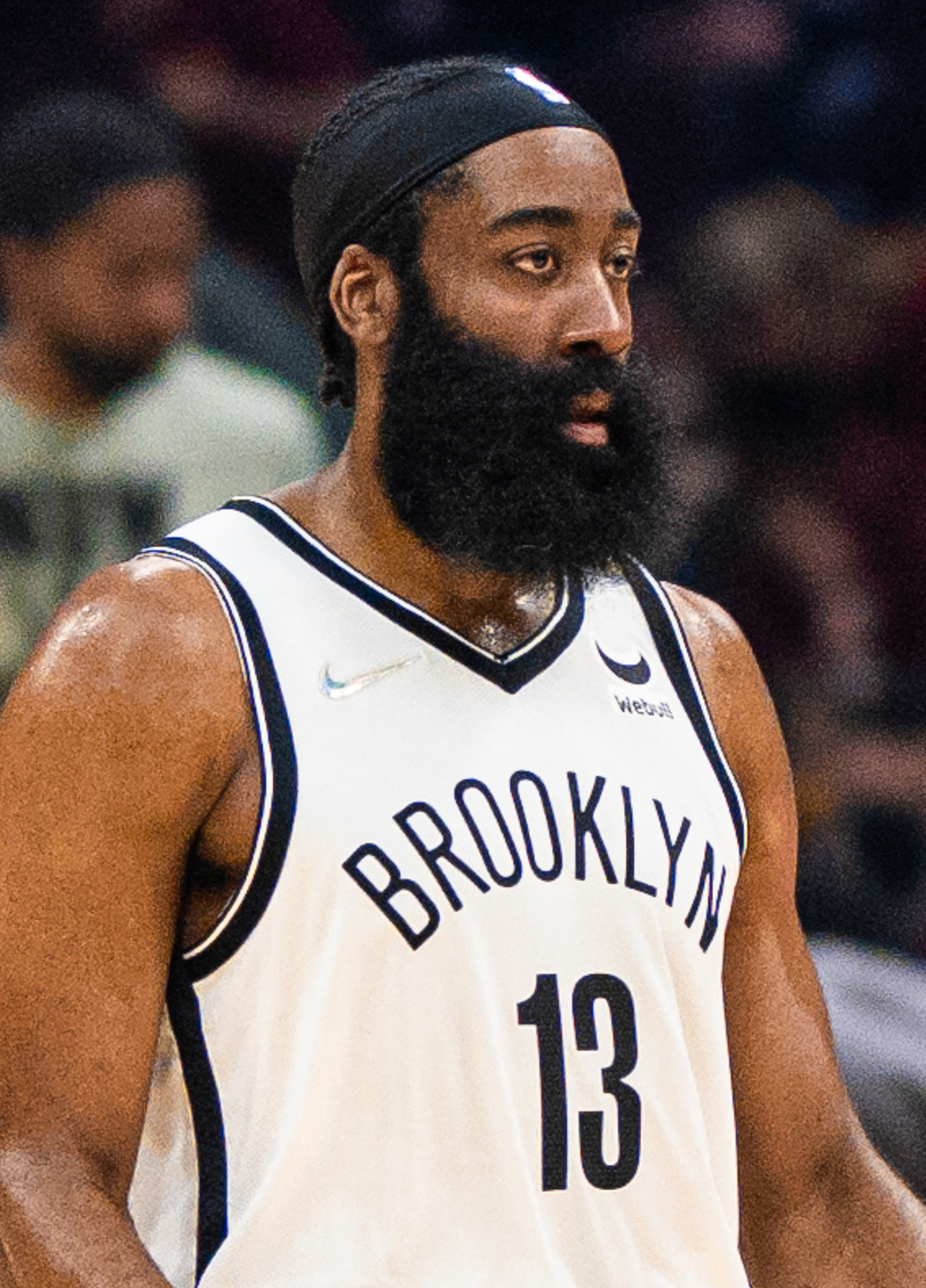
James Harden

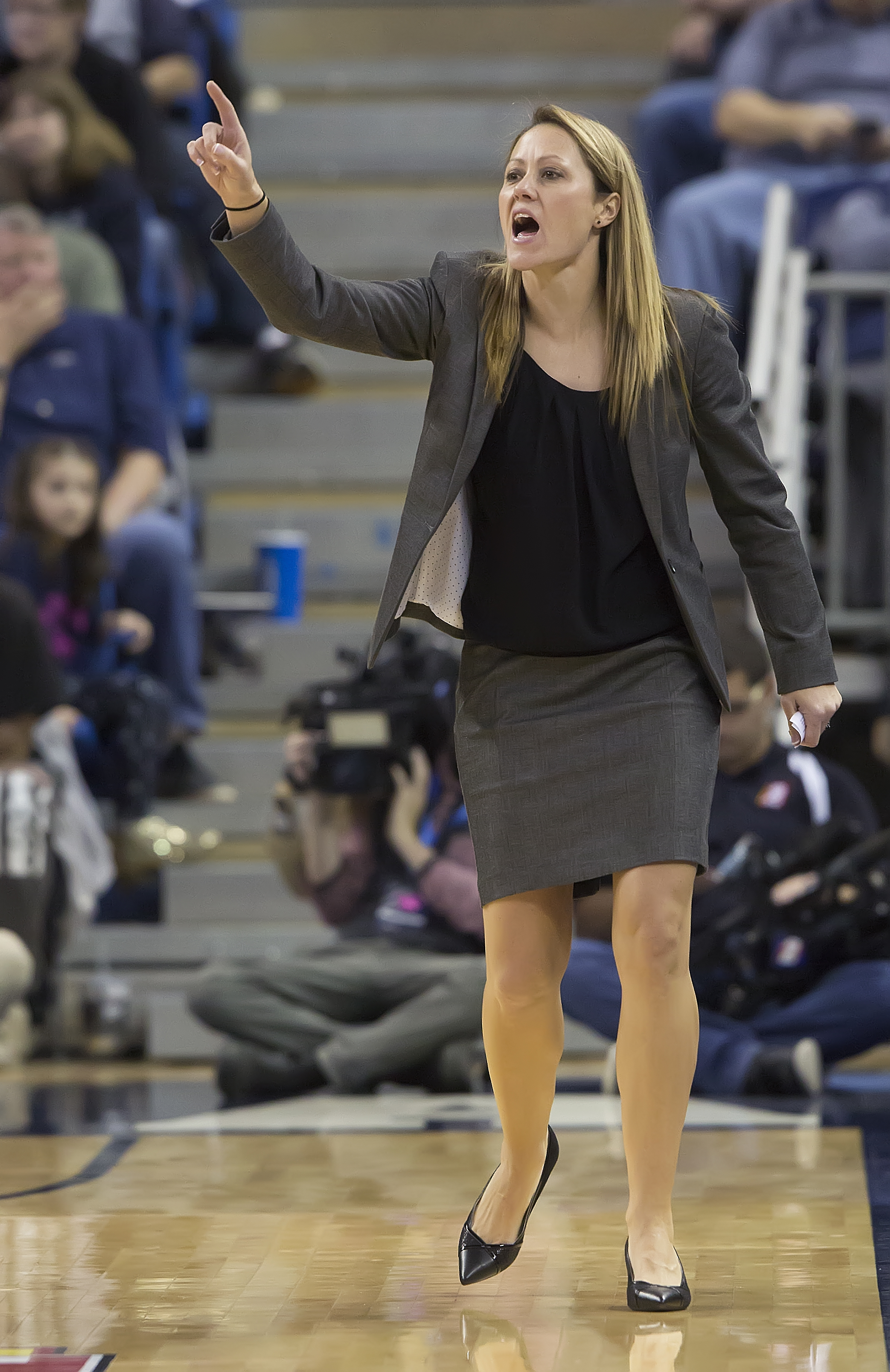
Amanda Levens

Basketball
| Name | Years played at ASU | Notes | Ref. |
|---|---|---|---|
| Ty Abbott | 2007–2011 | | |
| Monique Ambers | 1989–1993 | Played in the WNBA | |
| Promise Amukamara | 2011–2015 | 2020 Olympian representing Nigeria | |
| Jamie Andrisevic | 2002–2005 | | |
| Gib Arnold | 1987–1988 | | |
| Jay Arnote | 1967–1969, 1971 | | |
| Antwi Atuahene | 2005–2008 | | |
| Willie Atwood | 2014–2016 | | |
| Isaac Austin | 1989–1991 | Played in the NBA, 1991–2001 | |
| Jordan Bachynski | 2010–2014 | | |
| Willie Atwood | 2014–2016 | | |
| Marcus Bagley | 2020–2023 | Played in the NBA, 2025 | |
| Michael Batiste | 1997–1999 | Played in the NBA, 2002–2003 | |
| Ryneldi Becenti | 1992–1993 | First Native American player in the WNBA; retired number; graduated 1997 | |
| Art Becker | 1962–1964 | Played in the ABA, 1967–1973 | |
| Mario Bennett | 1991–1995 | Played in the NBA, 1995–1999 | |
| Gerry Blakes | 2014–2016 | | |
| Eric Boateng | 2006–2010 | 2012 Olympian representing Great Britain | |
| Sophie Brunner | 2013–2017 | Played in the WNBA | |
| Joy Burke | 2009–2014 | | |
| Joe Caldwell | 1962–1964 | Played in the NBA and ABA, 1964–1975; 1964 Olympian; honored number | |
| Jahii Carson | 2012–2014 | | |
| Zylan Cheatham | 2017–2019 | Played in the NBA, 2019–2023 | |
| Josh Christopher | 2020–2021 | Played in the NBA, 2021–25; now playing in the Israeli Basketball Premier League | |
| Frankie Collins | 2022–2024 | | |
| Carolyn DeHoff | 1987–1990 | Coached at Wyoming, Weber State, Utah and North Dakota State | |
| Jim Deines | 1980–1982, 1983–1985 | | |
| Ike Diogu | 2002–2005 | Played in the NBA, 2005–2009; two-time Olympian representing Nigeria; honored number | |
| Quinn Dornstauder | 2013–2017 | | |
| Luguentz Dort | 2018–2019 | Played in the NBA, 2019–present; 2024 Olympian representing Canada | |
| Richie Edwards | 2013–2014 | | |
| Rob Edwards | 2017–2020 | Played in the NBA, 2021–2022 | |
| Courtney Ekmark | 2017–2019 | | |
| Shannon Evans | 2016–2018 | | |
| Jamal Faulkner | 1990–1992 | | |
| Carrick Felix | 2010–2013 | Played in the NBA, 2013–2014 and 2017–2018 | |
| Dwayne Fontana | 1990–1994 | | |
| Torian Graham | 2016–2017 | | |
| Dennis Hamilton | 1963–1966 | Played in the NBA and ABA, 1967–1971 | |
| Kym Hampton | 1980–1984 | WNBA player and coach; retired number | |
| Taya Hanson | 2018–2022 | | |
| James Harden | 2007–2009 | Played in the NBA, 2009–present; 2012 Olympian representing the U.S.; retired number | |
| Rico Harris | —N/a | Played for the Harlem Globetrotters | |
| Corey Hawkins | 2010–2011 | | |
| Tra Holder | 2014–2018 | | |
| Lionel Hollins | 1973-1975 | Played in the NBA, 1975–1985; head coach of the Memphis Grizzlies and Brooklyn Nets; honored number | |
| DJ Horne | 2021–2023 | | |
| Eddie House | 1997–2000 | Played in the NBA, 2000–2011; honored number | |
| Briann January | 2006–2009 | Played in the WNBA, 2009–2022; retired number | |
| Marreon Jackson | 2021–2022 | | |
| Eric Jacobsen | 2012–2016 | | |
| Kodi Justice | 2014–2018 | | |
| Bill Kennedy | 1969–1971 | NCAA and NBA referee | |
| Egor Koulechov | 2013–2014 | | |
| Emilio Kovačić | 1988–1990 | | |
| Kevin Kruger | 2002–2006 | | |
| Rihards Kuksiks | 2007–2011 | | |
| Mark Landsberger | 1976–1977 | Played in the NBA, 1977–1984 | |
| Amanda Levens | 2000–2002 | | |
| Fat Lever | 1978–1982 | Played in the NBA, 1982–1994; honored number | |
| Freddie Lewis | 1964–1966 | Played in the NBA and ABC, 1966–1977 | |
| Alton Lister | 1978–1981 | Played in the NBA, 1981–1992 and 1995–1999; honored number | |
| Scott Lloyd | 1972–1976 | Played in the NBA, 1976–1982 | |
| Trent Lockett | 2009–2012 | Graduated 2012 | |
| Remy Martin | 2017–2021 | | |
| Shaquielle McKissic | 2013–2015 | | |
| Chet McNabb | 1942 | Played professional basketball for the Baltimore Bullets (1944–1954) of the Basketball Association of America | |
| Curtis Millage | 2001–2003 | | |
| Kurt Nimphius | 1976–1980 | Played in the NBA, 1981–1990 | |
| Obinna Oleka | 2015–2017 | | |
| Jim Owens | 1969–1973 | Played in the NBA, 1973–1975 | |
| Ruslan Pateev | 2009–2013 | | |
| Jeff Pendergraph (Ayres) | 2005–2009 | Played in the NBA, 2009–2016 | |
| Jayden Quaintance | 2024–2025 | | |
| Shawn Redhage | 1999–2003 | 2008 Olympian representing Australia; played professionally in Australia; graduated 2007 | |
| Ron Riley | 1992–1996 | | |
| Tony Ronaldson | 1991–1992 | Professional player in Australia for a total of 21 seasons | |
| Victor Rudd | 2009–2010 | | |
| Robbi Ryan | 2017–2021 | | |
| Joson Sanon | 2024–2025 | | |
| Sylvester Seay | 2005–2007 | | |
| Byron Scott | 1979–1983 | Played in the NBA, 1983–1997; coach; honored number (graduated 2024) | |
| Dymond Simon | | Played in the WNBA | |
| Stevin Smith | 1990–1994 | Played in the NBA, 1996–1997 | |
| Tommy Smith | 1999–2003 | | |
| Awvee Storey | 1998–2002 | Played in the NBA, 2004–2006 | |
| Paul Stovall | 1970–1972 | Played in the NBA and ABA, 1972–1974 | |
| Rebecca Tobin | 2007–2011 | Played professionally in Europe | |
| Elias Valtonen | 2018–2020 | | |
| Alonzo Verge Jr. | 2019–2021 | | |
| Warren Washington | 2022–2023 | | |
| Romello White | 2017–2020 | | |
| Rudy White | 1972–1975 | Played in the NBA, 1975–1980 | |
| Paul Williams | 1979–1983 | | |
| Sam Williams | 1978–1981 | Played in the NBA, 1981–1985 | |
| Tony Zeno | 1975–1979 | Played in the NBA, 1979–1980 | |
