= General Ryan =

People with the surname Ryan who have held the rank of General include:

- Charles Ryan (surgeon) (1853–1926), Australian Military Forces major general
- Cornelius E. Ryan (1896–1972), U.S. Army major general
- John Dale Ryan, USAF Chief of Staff
- Kurt J. Ryan (fl. 1980s–2020s), U.S. Army major general
- Michael A. Ryan (fl. 1980s–2000s), U.S. Army brigadier general
- Michael E. Ryan, also USAF Chief of Staff, and son of John Dale Ryan
- Michael P. Ryan (USMC) (1916–2005), U.S. Marine Corps major general
- Patrick J. Ryan (chaplain) (1902–1975), U.S. Army major general
- Thomas M. Ryan Jr. (born 1928), U.S. Air Force general
- General Ryan, a fictional character in the graphic novel The Hills Have Eyes: The Beginning

== See also ==
- Attorney General Ryan (disambiguation)
