= List of Arizona State University baseball players =

Arizona State University (ASU) has graduated a number of athletes. This includes graduates, non-graduate former students and current students of ASU who are notable for their achievements within athletics, sometimes before or after their time at ASU. Athletes in other sports can be found in the list of Arizona State University athletes; other alumni, including non-playing coaches and athletic administrators, can be found in the list of Arizona State University alumni.

The first recorded sporting event in the history of what was originally the Tempe Normal School was a baseball game played in 1891. As of 2024, ASU is second among all NCAA universities with 117 alumni who have played in Major League Baseball (MLB) and has the most inductees into the College Baseball Hall of Fame. ASU's contributions to MLB include Barry Bonds, Dustin Pedroia, Reggie Jackson and Rick Monday.

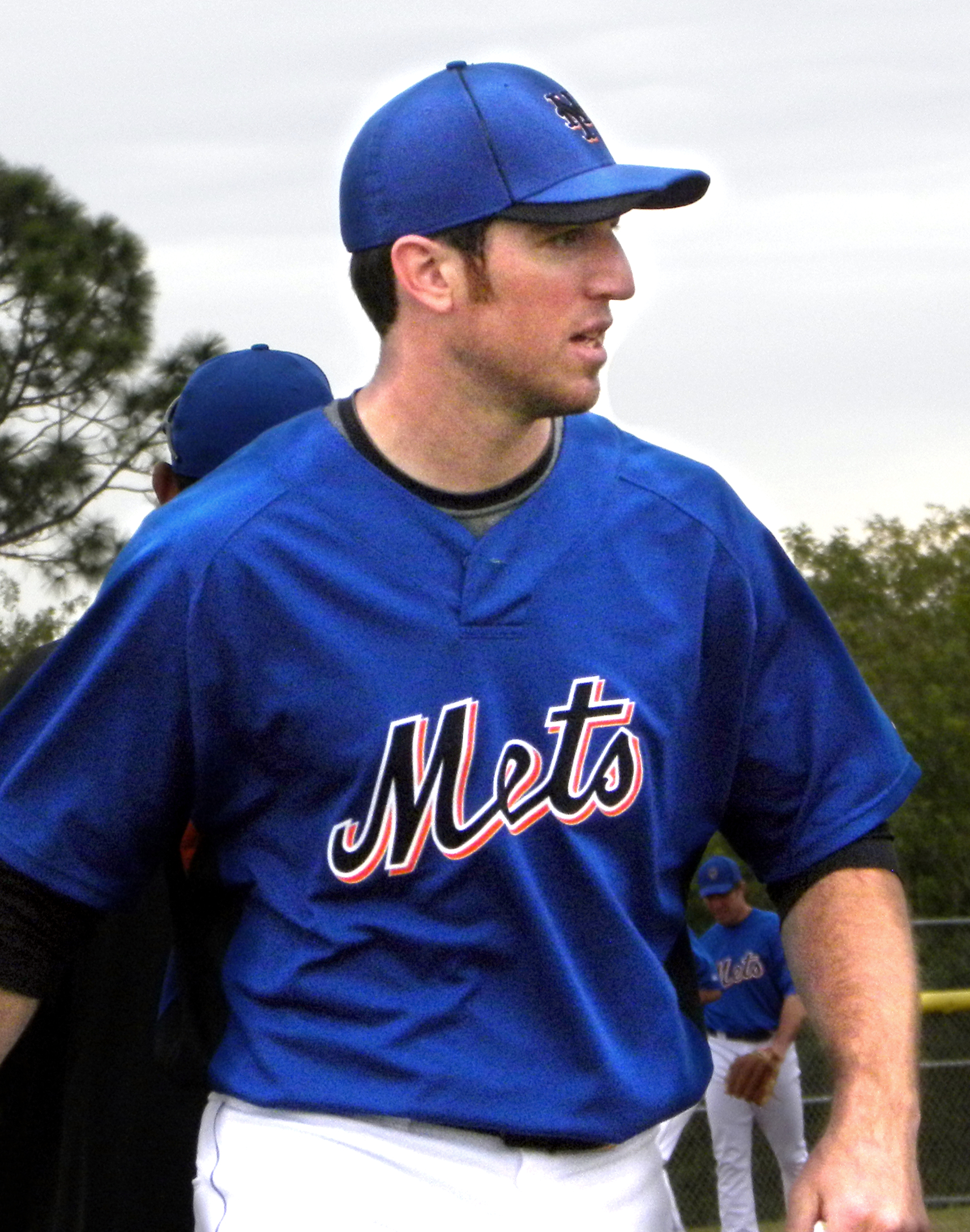
Ike Davis

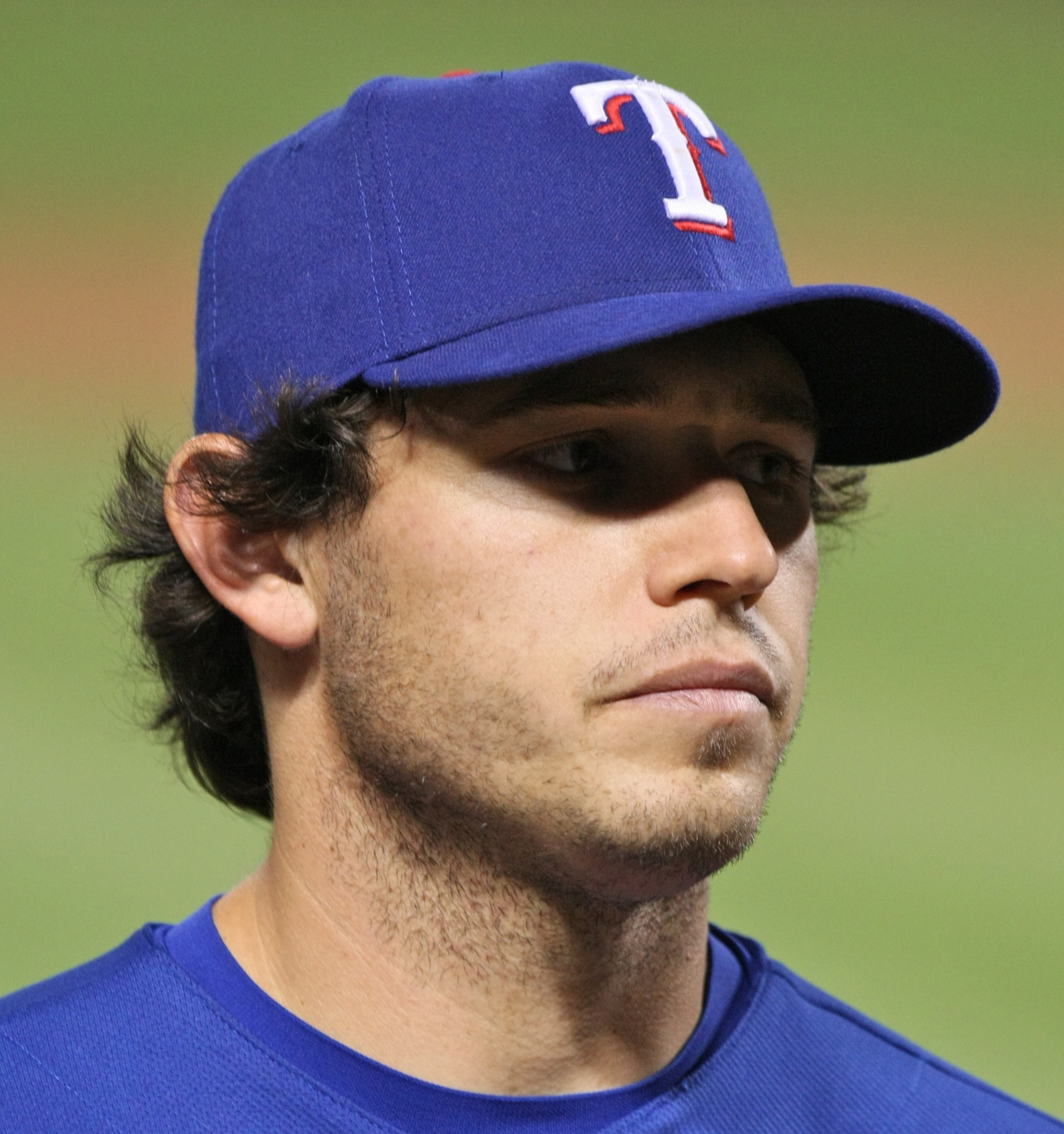
Ian Kinsler

Baseball
Name	Years played at ASU	Notes	Ref.
Jamie Allen	1977–1979	Played in MLB, 1983; later coached in MLB	
Gary Allenson	1973–1976	Played in MLB, 1973–1976	
Andrew Aplin	2010–2012		
Joe Arnold	1968	Inducted into the College Baseball Hall of Fame in 2015	
Doug Baker	1982	Played in MLB, 1988–1990	
Chris Bando	1975–1978	Inducted into the College Baseball Hall of Fame in 2024; played in MLB, 1981–1989	
Sal Bando	1964–1965	Inducted into the College Baseball Hall of Fame in 2013; honored number; played in MLB, 1966–1981	
Eddie Bane	1971–1973	Honored number; played in MLB, 1973, 1975–1976	
Alan Bannister	1970–1972	Honored number; played in MLB, 1974-1985	
Floyd Bannister	1974–1976	Inducted into the College Baseball Hall of Fame in 2008; honored number; played in MLB, 1977–1992	
Austin Barnes	2009–2011	Played in MLB, 2015–	
Tony Barnette	2005–2006	Played in MLB, 2015–2019	
Jake Barrett	2010–2012	Played in MLB, 2016–2019	
Marty Barrett	1979	Played in MLB, 1982–1991	
Chris Beasley	1983–1984	Played in MLB, 1991	
Jim Benedict	1983		
Mike Benjamin	1986–1987	Played in MLB, 1989–2000 and 2002	
Hunter Bishop	2017–2019		
Seth Blair	2008–2010		
Willie Bloomquist	1997–1999	Played in MLB, 2002–2015; ASU baseball head coach since 2022	
Randy Bobb	1967	Played in MLB, 1968–1969	
Barry Bonds	1983–1985	Awarded the ASU Alumni Achievement Award despite not graduating; honored number; played in MLB, 1986–2007	
Ryan Bradley	1995–1997	Played in MLB, 1998	
Hubie Brooks	1977-1978	Honored number; played in MLB, 1980–1994	
Travis Buck	2003–2005	Played in MLB, 2007–2012	
Ryan Burr	2013–2015	Played in MLB, 2018–2022 and 2024	
Kole Calhoun	2009–2010	Played in MLB, 2012–2023	
Mike Colbern	1974–1976	Played in MLB, 1978–1979	
Brooks Conrad	1999-2001	Played in MLB, 2008–2010	
Jim Crawford	1969–1972	Played in MLB, 1973, 1975–1978	
Jacob Cruz	1992–1994	Played in MLB, 1996–2005	
Colin Curtis	2004–2006	Played in MLB, 2010	
Khristian Curtis	2023	Played in MLB, 2026–	
Ron Davini	1966–1968		
Alvin Davis	1979–1982	Honored number; played in MLB, 1984–1992	
Ike Davis	2006–2008	Played in MLB, 2010–2016	
Dustin Delucchi	1997–1999		
Mike Devereaux	1984–1985	Played in MLB, 1987–1998	
Ralph Dickenson (Dick)	1969		
John Dolinsek	1968–1969		
Chris Duffy	2001	Played in MLB, 2005–2007 and 2009	
Jeff Duncan	1999–2000	Played in MLB, 2003–2004	
Duffy Dyer	1965–1966	Played in MLB, 1968–1981	
Jake Elmore	2008	Played in MLB, 2012–2019	
Tim Esmay	1986–1987	ASU baseball head coach, 2010–2014	
Mike Esposito	2000–2002	Played in MLB, 2005	
Andre Ethier	2002–2003	Honored number; played in MLB, 2006–2017	
Larry Fritz	1969	Played in MLB, 1975	
Gary Gentry	1967	National Player of the Year, 1967; played in MLB, 1969–1975	
Shawn Gilbert	1984	Played in MLB, 1997–1998 and 2000	
Tuffy Gosewisch	2002–2005	Played in MLB, 2013–2017	
Larry Gura	1967–1969	Honored number; played in MLB, 1970–1985	
Cory Hahn	2011	Paralyzed from the chest down in a game; became a scout for the Arizona Diamondbacks	
R. J. Harrison	1973–1975	Scouting executive with the Tampa Bay Rays	
Eric Helfand	1989–1990	Played in MLB, 1993–1995	
Doug Henry	1983–1985	Played in MLB, 1991–2001	
Hadley Hicks	1957–1958		
Kevin Higgins	1988–1989	Played in MLB, 1993	
Donnie Hill	1981	Played in MLB, 1983–1992	
Stan Holmes	1979–1981		
Bob Horner	1976–1978	Inducted into the College Baseball Hall of Fame in 2006; honored number; played in MLB, 1978–1986 and 1988	
Dave Hudgens	1975–1978	Played in MLB, 1983	
Darrell Jackson	1974–1977	Played in MLB, 1978–1982	
Reggie Jackson	1966	Member of the Baseball Hall of Fame, National Player of the Year 1966; honored number; played in MLB, 1967–1986	
Mitch Jones	1999–2000	Played in MLB, 2009	
Luke Keaschall	2023	Played in MLB, 2025–present	
Ryan Kellogg	2013–2015		
Merrill Kelly	2010	Played in MLB, 2019–present	
Mike Kelly	1989–1991	Honored number; played in MLB, 1994–1999	
Ian Kinsler	2002	Played in MLB, 2006–2019	
Jason Kipnis	2008–2009	Played in MLB, 2011–2020	
Lerrin LaGrow	1968–1969	Played in MLB, 1970–1980	
Ken Landreaux	1974–1976	Played in MLB, 1977–1987	
Jeff Larish	2002–2005	Played in MLB, 2008–2010	
Mike Leake	2007–2009	Played in MLB, 2010–2019	
Jim Lentine	1973–1974	Played in MLB, 1978–1980	
Lyle Lin	2017–2019	Taiwanese player	
Jack Lind	1966–1967	Played in MLB, 1974–1975	
Pat Listach	1988	Played in MLB, 1992–1997	
John Littlefield	1974	Played in MLB, 1980–1981	
Paul Lo Duca	1993	Honored number; played in MLB, 1998–2008	
Pete Lovrich	1962	Played in MLB, 1963	
Sean Lowe	1992	Played in MLB, 1997–2003	
Jerry Maddox	1974–1975	Played in MLB, 1978	
Drew Maggi	2009–2010	Played in MLB, 2023	
Deven Marrero	2010–2012	Played in MLB, 2015–2022	
Alec Marsh	2017–2019	Played in MLB, 2023–2024	
Seth Martinez	2014–2016	Played in MLB, 2021–present	
Adam McCreery	2012–2013	Played in MLB, 2018	
Oddibe McDowell	1983–1984	Honored number; 1988 Olympian representing the Netherlands; played in MLB, 1985–1994	
Cody McKay	1993–1996	Played in MLB, 2002 and 2004	
Luis Medina	1984–1985	Played in MLB, 1988–1991	
Lemmie Miller	1980–1981	Played in MLB, 1984	
Blas Minor	1987–1988	Played in MLB, 1992–1997	
Gabe Molina	1996	Played in MLB, 1999–2003	
Rick Monday	1965	National Player of the Year, 1965; honored number; played in MLB, 1966–1984	
Paul Moskau	1973	Played in MLB, 1977–1983	
Ricky Nelson	1979–1981	Played in MLB, 1983–1986	
Chris Nyman	1975–1977	Played in MLB, 1982–1983	
Jim Otten	1972–1973	Played in MLB, 1974–1981	
Bob Pate	1975–1976	Played in MLB, 1980–1981	
Dustin Pedroia	2002–2004	Honored number; played in MLB, 2006–2019	
Lee Pelekoudas	1970–1972	Interim general manager of the Seattle Mariners, 2008	
Jeff Pentland	1966–1968	MLB hitting coach	
Ricky Peters	1974–1977	Played in MLB, 1979–1981, 1983 and 1986	
Ken Phelps	1975–1976	Played in MLB, 1980–1990	
John Poloni	1973–1975	Played in MLB, 1977	
Paul Powell	1968–1969	Played in MLB, 1971, 1973 and 1975	
Trent Pratt	1999–2000	Head baseball coach at Brigham Young University	
Gary Rajsich	1974–1976	Played in MLB, 1982–1985	
Lenny Randle	1968–1970	Played in MLB, 1971–1982	
Scott Reid	1967	Played in MLB, 1969–1970	
Brady Rodgers	2010–2012	Played in MLB, 2016 and 2019	
Ron Romanick	1980	Played in MLB, 1984–1986	
Andrew Romine	2005–2007	Played in MLB, 2010–2021	
Kevin Romine	1981–1982	Honored number; played in MLB, 1985–1991	
Paul Runge	1961–1962	MLB umpire	
Dennis Sarfate	2000	Played in MLB, 2006–2009	
Al Schmelz	1963, 1965	Played in MLB, 1967	
Mike Schwabe	1987	Played in MLB, 1989–1990	
Brian Serven	2014–2016	Played in MLB, 2022–2024	
Sterling Slaughter	1961	Played in MLB, 1964	
Tim Smith	2007		
Jack Smitheran	1964–1966	Coached UC Riverside Highlanders baseball from 1974 to 2004	
Eric Sogard	2005–2007	Played in MLB, 2010–2021	
Tim Spehr	1987–1988	Played in MLB, 1991–1999	
Josh Spence	2009	Played in MLB, 2011–2012	
Todd Steverson	1990–1992	Played in MLB, 1995–1996	
Mel Stocker	2000–2001	Played in MLB, 2007	
Craig Swan	1969–1972	Played in MLB, 1973–1984	
Jon Switzer	1999–2001	Played in MLB, 2003, 2005–2007 and 2009	
Erik Tolman	2019–2021	Played in MLB, 2026–	
Spencer Torkelson	2018–2020	Played in MLB, 2022–present	
Jim Umbarger	1972–1974	Played in MLB, 1975–1978	
Jason Urquidez	2004–2005		
Ed Vande Berg	1979–1980	Played in MLB, 1982–1988	
Fernando Viña	1990	Played in MLB, 1993–2004	
Don Wakamatsu	1982–1985	Played in MLB, 1991	
Brett Wallace	2006–2008	Played in MLB, 2010–2013 and 2015	
Alika Williams	2018–2020	Played in MLB, 2023–2024	
Trevor Williams	2011–2013	Played in MLB, 2016–2024	
Antone Williamson	1992–1994	Played in MLB, 1997	
Bump Wills	1971–1974	Played in MLB, 1977–1982	
Gage Workman	2018–2020	Played in MLB, 2025–present	
