= List of Arizona State University golfers =

Arizona State University (ASU) has graduated a number of athletes. This includes graduates, non-graduate former students and current students of ASU who are notable for their achievements within athletics, sometimes before or after their time at ASU. Athletes in other sports can be found in the list of Arizona State University athletes; other alumni, including non-playing coaches and athletic administrators, can be found in the list of Arizona State University alumni.

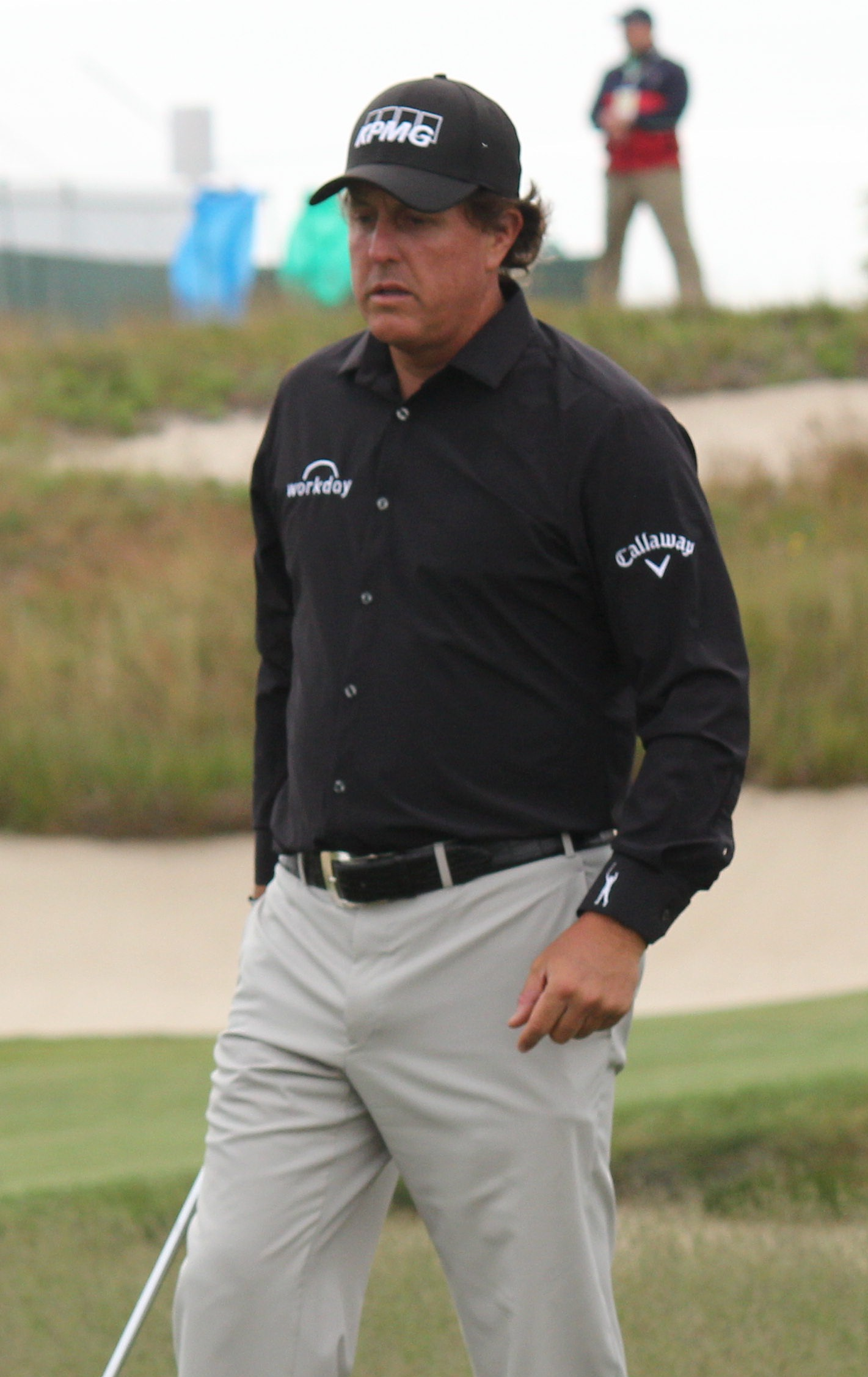
Phil Mickelson

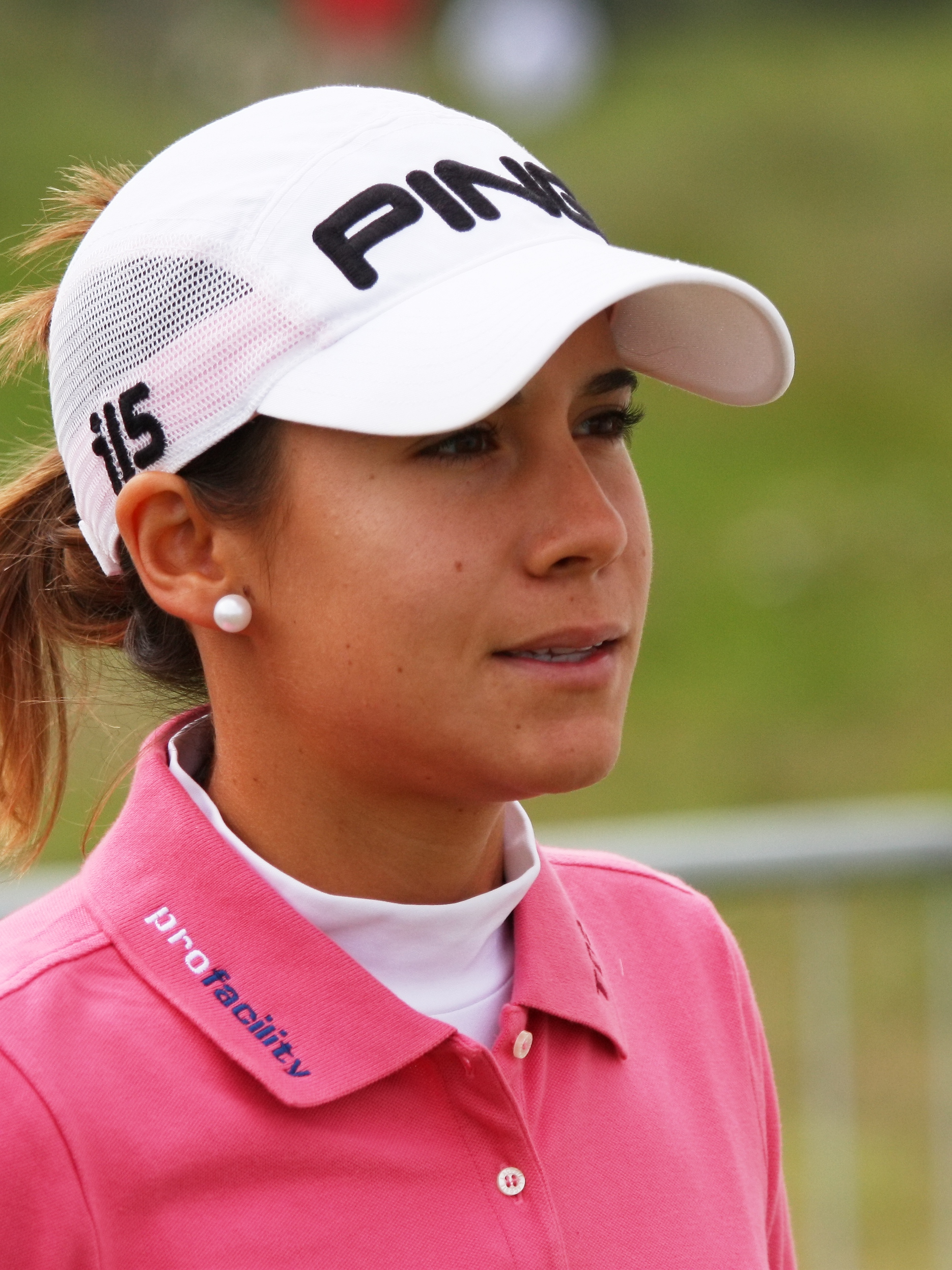
Azahara Muñoz

Golf
Name	Years played at ASU	Notes	Ref.
John Adams	1974–1975	Professional golfer	
Benjamin Alvarado	2005–2007	Professional golfer	
Danielle Ammaccapane	1984–1987	Professional golfer	
José Luis Ballester	2021–2025	Professional golfer; 2024 U.S. Amateur champion	
Knut Børsheim	2006–2010	Professional golfer	
Heather Bowie Young	1994–1995	Professional golfer	
Greg Bruckner		Professional golfer	
Brandie Burton	1990	Professional golfer	
Jeanne-Marie Busuttil	1997–1998	Professional golfer	
Alejandro Cañizares	2002–2006	Professional golfer	
JoAnne Gunderson Carner	1957–1961	1960 National Champion, All-American, professional golfer	
Jim Carter	1981–1984	Professional golfer	
Paul Casey	1997–2000	Professional golfer; 2020 Olympian representing Great Britain	
Paul Chaplet	2018–2020	Professional golfer	
Carlota Ciganda	2008–2011	Professional golfer; three-time Olympian representing Spain	
Alejandro del Rey	2016–2020	Professional golfer	
Todd Demsey	1992–1995	1993 NCAA Champion	
Wenyi Ding	2023–2024	Professional golfer	
Jared du Toit	2015–2016	Professional golfer	
Tobias Edén	2014–2016	Professional golfer	
Michelle Estill	1986–1989	Professional golfer	
Alessandra Fanali	2018–2022	Professional golfer; 2024 Olympian representing Italy	
Heather Farr	1983–1985	Professional golfer	
Dan Forsman	1978–1981	Professional golfer	
Alexandra Försterling	2018–2022	Professional golfer; 2024 Olympian representing Germany	
Philip Francis	2010–2011	Professional golfer	
Amy Fruhwirth	1986–1991	Professional golfer	
Bob Gilder	1972–1974	Professional golfer	
Linn Grant	2019–2021	Professional golfer; 2024 Olympian representing Sweden	
Chris Hanell	1993–1997	Professional golfer	
Mike Hill		Professional golfer	
Gary Jacobson	1972–1975	Professional golfer	
Noemí Jiménez	2012–2015	Professional golfer	
Per-Ulrik Johansson	1989–1990	Professional golfer	
Jennifer Johnson	2010	Professional golfer	
Ryggs Johnston	2019–2024	Professional golfer	
Matt Jones		Professional golfer	
Jimin Kang	2000–2002	Professional golfer	
Jesper Kennegård	2007–2011	Professional golfer	
Emilee Klein	1993–1994	Professional golfer	
Chan Kim	2008–2009	Professional golfer	
Niklas Lemke	2003–2007	Professional golfer	
Amanda Linnér	2020–2023	Professional golfer	
Roberta Liti	2014–2018	Professional golfer	
Bill Loeffler	1976–1978	Professional golfer	
Billy Mayfair	1985–1988	Professional golfer	
Olivia Mehaffey	2017–2021	Professional golfer	
Lauri Merten	1979–1982	Professional golfer	
Phil Mickelson	1988–1992	Professional golfer, All-American	
Alice Miller	1974–1978	Professional golfer	
Giulia Molinaro	2008–2012	Professional golfer; two-time Olympian representing Italy	
Mike Morley	1964–1968	Professional golfer	
Charlotte Montgomery	1977–1980	Professional golfer	
Azahara Muñoz	2005–2009	2008 NCAA champion, professional golfer; three-time Olympian representing Spain	
Grayson Murray	2014–2015	Professional golfer	
Miriam Nagl	2000	Professional golfer; 2016 Olympian representing Brazil	
Pia Nilsson	1978–1981	Professional golfer	
Anna Nordqvist	2007–2009	Professional golfer; two-time Olympian representing Sweden	
Grace Park	1998–2000	Professional golfer	
Jin Park	1998–2001	Professional golfer	
Pat Perez	1994–1997	Professional golfer	
Scott Pinckney	2007–2011	Professional golfer	
Mary Bea Porter	1968–1973	Professional golfer; played golf, basketball, volleyball and softball at ASU	
David Puig	2020-2022	Professional golfer; 2024 Olympian representing Spain	
Tom Purtzer	1970–1973	Professional golfer	
Jeff Quinney	1997–2001	Professional golfer	
Jon Rahm	2012-2016	Professional golfer; 2024 Olympian representing Spain	
Chez Reavie	2001–2004	Professional golfer	
Max Rottluff	2012–2016	Professional golfer	
Pearl Sinn	1986–1989	Professional golfer	
Joey Snyder III	1993–1996	Professional golfer	
Carol Sorenson Flenniken	1960–1964	1962 national champion	
Louise Stahle	2005	Professional golfer	
Linnea Ström	2016–2017	Professional golfer	
Tina Tombs	1981–1985	Professional golfer	
Howard Twitty	1980–1982	Professional golfer	
Wendy Ward	1992–1995	Professional golfer	
Pamela Wright	1986–1988	Professional golfer	
Kevin Yu	2016–2020	Professional golfer; 2024 Olympian representing Chinese Taipei	
