= Brad Hendricks =

American lawyer

- Born: May 4, 1951 (age 75); San Antonio, Texas, U.S.
- Education: Arizona State University; University of Arkansas at Little Rock School of Law
- Occupations: Attorney; Former President of the Arkansas Trial Lawyers Association; President of The Brad Hendricks Law Firm
- Website: www.bradhendricks.com

Brad Lowber Hendricks (born May 4, 1951, in San Antonio, Texas) is an American attorney, former President of the Arkansas Trial Lawyers Association, and President of The Brad Hendricks Law Firm, one of the largest firms in the State of Arkansas. He is the son of Lowber Hendricks (June 28, 1923 - September 4, 1998), a prominent Arkansas attorney and Pulaski County Circuit Court Judge. Brad's decision to become an attorney is largely attributed to his father, Lowber Hendricks. His siblings are Karol Anne McNutt and Bryan Hendricks.

== Education ==
Brad Hendricks attended Arizona State University and obtained his Bachelor of Science degree, graduating cum laude. While in college, Brad was a member of the Delta Theta chapter of Pi Sigma Alpha (ΠΣΑ or PSA), the National Political Science Honor Society. He then attended law school at the University of Arkansas at Little Rock School of Law, from which he obtained his Juris Doctor in 1980.

== Legal career ==
=== The Arkansas Department of Correction ===
Although Brad Hendricks’ decision to become an attorney has been largely attributed to his father's influence, he did not immediately begin practice law at a law firm upon becoming a member of the Arkansas Bar Association. In 1980, after graduating from law school, Hendricks was recruited by the State of Arkansas as a Compliance Attorney to bring the Arkansas Department of Correction into compliance with legal standards announced by the United States Supreme Court in Hutto v. Finney, 437 U.S. 678 (1978). In that case, the Supreme Court determined that the practice of using punitive isolation for more than 30 days was prohibited by the Eighth Amendment to the United States Constitution.

The Court's decision in Hutto v. Finney was significant because it was not only one of the first successful lawsuits filed an inmate against a correctional institution, but it also identified and distinguished between acceptable and unacceptable punitive measures that a prison might employ. The Hutto decision followed nearly 10 years of litigation against the Arkansas Department of Correction, during which the physical conditions of cells, guard behavior, and the diet and sleeping arrangements of inmates were scrutinized. One judge described the conditions as "a dark and evil world completely alien to the free world." Ultimately, in Hutto, the United States Supreme Court determined that the practice of using punitive isolation for more than 30 days was prohibited by the Eighth Amendment to the United States Constitution.

Due in large part to Brad's efforts to reform Arkansas' prison system's security, brutality, racism, inmate discipline and more than 100 medical, legal and other administrative issues, the Arkansas Department of Correction became one of the first state correctional systems to adopt standards deemed acceptable by the Hutto court and its progeny. Brad Hendricks was subsequently named the Arkansas Department of Correction Employee of the Year in 1982 and later served as the Assistant Warden of the Wrightsville Unit of the Arkansas Department of Correction.

=== The Haskins Law Firm ===
After leaving the Arkansas Department of Correction, Brad Hendricks joined the Haskins Law Firm, a multi-state law firm. During that time, Hendricks’ practice was dedicated primarily to children harmed by obstetric, neonatal or pediatric malpractice, including those children whose injuries included cerebral palsy.

=== The Brad Hendricks Law Firm ===
In 1994, Hendricks formed the Brad Hendricks Law Firm in Little Rock, Arkansas. At the firm's inception, The Arkansas Times predicted that, in the future, the firm would become one of interest to the business community. By 2000, the firm was recognized by Arkansas Business Weekly as one of the 25 largest firms in the State of Arkansas, with the distinction of being the largest plaintiff's firm at that time. On January 2, 2014, the firm celebrated twenty years of continued service to the Little Rock community and the State of Arkansas, during a gathering attended by employees, family, and long-time friends of Mr. Hendricks.

== Arkansas Bar Association ==
Brad Hendricks has been a member of the Arkansas Bar Association since 1980. Hendricks served as an elected member of the Arkansas Bar Association's House of Delegates for approximately 10 years, until he voluntarily chose not to run for re-election, at which time, he became non-voting tenured delegate, a position he retains as of March 2012. In order to become a non-voting tenured delegate, a member must have served in the House of Delegates for at least six years. As a non-voting tenured delegate, Hendricks may address the full House of Delegates on any issue under consideration by the House of Delegates. Typically, only current and tenured delegates may address the full House of Delegates, unless requested to do so by special invitation.

Hendricks has also chaired several committees of the Arkansas Bar Association throughout his career.

As of July 2019, he is the Chair of the Arkansas Bar Association's Professional Ethics Committee, to which he was appointed in 2004. In 2005, that Committee, together with the Arkansas Bar Association's House of Delegates, petitioned the Arkansas Supreme Court to revise the Arkansas Rules of Professional Conduct by adopting rules based on the American Bar Association's Model Rules of Professional Conduct. Also serving on the Committee at that time were Howard Brill, a professor at the University of Arkansas School of Law and author of Arkansas Professional and Judicial Ethics and Arkansas Law of Damages, and the Honorable D. Price Marshall Jr., who is currently serving as a judge in the United States District Court for the Eastern District of Arkansas.

Hendricks previously served as Chair of the Tort Committee and also served as Chair of the Task Force on the Unauthorized Practice of Law.

== Arkansas Trial Lawyers Association ==
Hendricks is also a member of the Arkansas Trial Lawyers Association, an organization whose members are “dedicated to protecting the health and safety of Arkansas families, to enhancing consumer protections and to preserving each and every citizen’s right to trial by jury and access to the courts.” Hendricks is a past President of ATLA (2004–2005), and as of November 14, 2011, he is serving on the Legislation Committee, the Legislation Bill-Drafting Committee, the Awards Committee, and the Fundraising Committee.

As of July 2019, Hendricks was one of four ex-officio advisory non-voting members of ATLA's Board of Governor's executive committee. He has been included among the “Champions of Justice” for his support of ATLA on several occasions and has been recognized as a “Silver Diplomat” and “Platinum Founder,” as well as a “Ways & Means” member of ATLA due to his financial contributions to the organization.

== Arkansas Attorneys for Consumer Protection ==
In addition to his service to Arkansas' legal community, Hendricks has also dedicated much of his career to the protection of Arkansas consumers. On June 21, 1999, Brad Hendricks chaired a coalition of attorneys united to challenge a ruling by the Arkansas Supreme Court that limited the use of dramatizations and advertising testimonials by attorneys. Said Hendricks, the limitation "trampled on" attorneys' rights under the First Amendment to the United States Constitution.

Although Hendricks opposed the ruling that restricted attorneys' use of dramatizations and testimonials, he expressed approval of a separate restriction imposed by the Arkansas Supreme Court ruling that prohibits attorneys and law firms from contacting the families of people who have died as the result of an accident for 30 days after the accident. "I support that moratorium," Hendricks said. "People should not be besieged by legal correspondence before the funeral is over. They need time to adjust after something tragic happens."

Two days later, on June 23, 1999, the group formed the non-profit corporation, Arkansas Attorneys for Consumer Protection. Arkansas Attorneys for Consumer Protection is an organization devoted to protecting freedom of speech and to enhance public information, awareness, and access to information about the legal community and system.

A similar challenge to restrictions on attorney advertisement and the First Amendment has been raised in Virginia.

== Other professional affiliations ==
Brad Hendricks has been a member of the American Association for Justice (formerly known at the American Trial Lawyers Association), the American Bar Association, the Texas Trial Lawyers Association, the Texas Bar Association, and the Missouri Bar Association.

== Lobbying efforts ==
Hendricks is also a member of ATLA's Involved Members Political Action Committee (IMPACT), a bipartisan political action committee established by ATLA “to elect policy makers who support the civil justice system and who believe in protecting Arkansas’ families.” Brad Hendricks, together with Arkansas attorney and former-ATLA President Chris Heil drafted legislation commonly referred to as “the self-authenticating medical records bill.” Hendricks continues to serve as an IMPACT Trustee as of November 2011. He also formed a Legislative Question Committee in 2018 named Liberty Defense Network. Issue One was an attempt by big government to set a limit on the value of human life. This ballot measure was an attempt to change the Arkansas Constitution that guarantees your right to a jury trial. This initiative's artificial limit on the value of human life would have applied to every Arkansan, regardless of age or occupation. It was immoral and unconstitutional. It was an attempt by big government to take away an inherent right of the citizens of this State to determine for themselves what value human life has. This ballot measure was an effort to destroy the right to trial by jury as guaranteed by the Arkansas State Constitution. Hendricks vows to take on so-called "tort reform" every time it tries to strip rights from Arkansans.

== Honors and achievements ==
=== Recognition by the National Trial Lawyers Association ===
Mr. Hendricks was inducted into the National Trial Lawyers Association Top 100 Trial Lawyers list in 2013, 2015, 2016, and 2017. The National Trial Lawyers: Top 100 is an invitation-only organization composed of the premier trial lawyers from each state or region who meet stringent qualifications as civil plaintiff and/or criminal defense trial lawyers. Selection is based on a thorough multi-phase objective and uniformly applied process which includes peer nominations combined with third-party research. Membership is extended only to the select few of the most qualified attorneys from each state or region who demonstrate superior qualifications of leadership, reputation, influence, stature and public profile measured by objective and uniformly applied standards in compliance with state bar and national Rule 4–7. He's also a member of the Mass Tort Trial Lawyers Association and the Business Tort Trial Lawyers Association. The National Trial Lawyers Association has evaluated Mr. Hendricks’ qualifications and extended an exclusive invitation to him based on his performance as an exceptional trial lawyer in the practice area of Civil Plaintiff law.

=== Recognition by the Arkansas Trial Lawyers Association ===
Hendricks received the 2004-2005 Roxanne Wilson Advocacy Award, an award given annually by the Arkansas Trial Lawyers Association to a member who has shown an extraordinary passion for the law, the legal profession and the advancement of advocacy. In 2005, Hendricks also received the Consumer Advocate Award, which is presented to an attorney who has sponsored legislation on behalf of ATLA or who has been outspoken regarding issues related to the administration of justice; who has actively promoted legislation on behalf of consumers; who has exhibited leadership skills and a dedication to the preservation of our jury system; and who has promoted the legal profession and the attorney's role within the legal community.

On April 29, 2011, Hendricks received the Arkansas Trial Lawyers Association's Henry Woods Lifetime Achievement Award. This award is presented to a member of ATLA who “has dedicated his or her professional career to upholding the ideals of [ATLA]” and “is intended to recognize an attorney who has devoted his or her career to helping injured victims, consumers and those who simply lack the ability to protect their own rights.”

More recently, in 2018, Mr. Hendricks was recognized by then-President Joey McCutchen. He was also a recipient of the 2014 President's Award, given by then-President Don Elliott. This award is not presented annually by the President of the Arkansas Trial Lawyers Association, but may be given by any President to a member of ATLA in recognition of the recipient's service and dedication to ATLA and its mission statement.

=== Recognition by the Arkansas Bar Association ===
In 2019, President of the Arkansas Bar Association Suzanne G. Clark, presented Hendricks with the Association's Golden Gavel Award in recognition of his work as Chairman of the Professional Ethics Committee. This honor was the fourth time to receive this award. He was previously awarded it in 2009, 2014, and 2016, for his exemplary service to the legal professional, including Mr. Hendricks' outstanding work as Chairman of the Arkansas Bar Association Professional Ethics Committee.

=== Recognition by Newsweek ===
The Brad Hendricks Law Firm was recognized by Newsweek magazine in its April 23, 2012, edition, as one of 20 Leaders in the areas of Medical Malpractice, Personal Injury Law, and Auto Accident Law. To be recognized, each law firm featured must be in good standing with a leading and accredited association of lawyers in the featured practice area; must have received local recognition for excellence; and must have a record of favorable results for its clients.

=== Recognition by the residents of Arkansas ===
Hendricks’ contribution to the legal community has also been recognized by the people of Arkansas. He has been recognized by the readers of The Arkansas Times as one of the best personal injury and medical malpractice attorneys in Arkansas, and was twice voted “Best Lawyer in Central Arkansas” by The Arkansas Democrat-Gazette, Arkansas’ largest public circulation newspaper.

In 2012, when Soiree Magazine named its top 100 attorneys in 14 different practice areas, Brad was one of only nine attorneys statewide recognized for excellence in personal injury law. He was again recognized by Soiree Magazine in the area of personal injury law in 2013. In 2014, for the third straight year, Mr. Hendricks was again recognized by Soiree Magazine at one of the Best Lawyers in Little Rock, this time in the area of litigation, along with an unprecedented total of six (6) other attorneys at The Brad Hendricks Law Firm.

== Publications ==
In 1998, Hendricks wrote an article, which was published in The Arkansas Lawyer, entitled “Barbarians at the Gate: Image, Ethics and the Unauthorized Practice of Law,” The Arkansas Lawyer, Vol. 33, No. 3 (Summer 1998). Of the criticisms that lawyers often articulate against other attorneys in different practice areas, Hendricks wrote:

“We are far too quick to blame one another instead of working together. To effectively combat the unauthorized practice of law, it is essential that we move beyond these unnecessary divisions and unite as a profession, by standing together to protect both the public and the legal profession from the unauthorized practice of law, we can strengthen the reputation of attorneys while addressing a serious and growing threat to the public and the integrity of our profession."

He also articulated his concerns about the unauthorized practice of law, which is prohibited in Arkansas by Ark. Code Ann. § 16-22-501:

“Unlicensed individuals are making inroads into virtually every segment of our profession. Accounting firms are buying law firms and engaging in the practice of law. There are strong arguments that collection agencies have long been practicing law without a license. [FN1] Non-lawyers with a toll free number offer estate planning as if one need only paint by numbers in order to properly protect and distribute one's assets after death. Living trusts are sold by unlicensed individuals with no thought given to the anguish suffered by a family when they learn that it is unenforceable and useless. Non-lawyers offer to do divorce work. Defense attorneys seldom litigate without interference from an adjuster. Insurance companies reportedly are now so bold as to issue written rules to defense firms governing which functions within the firms must be performed by paralegals instead of attorneys.” The result, according to Hendricks, causes substantial harm to the public and to the legal profession. The prohibition against the unauthorized practice of law, of course, does not apply to those licensed to practice law in Arkansas, other states, or even foreign countries.

Hendricks noted that attorneys in Arkansas are prohibited from soliciting clients directly and criticized the fact that defense farms regularly flouted this prohibition by occasionally using “direct, in-person and telephone solicitation to seek out insurance companies as the source of personal injury business.” If solicitation is prohibited, Hendricks opined, then it should also apply to defense firms, as well.

Hendricks defended attorneys and insisted that there are not too many attorney, given our “duty” to “resolve virtually every dispute in our society, from the smallest matter solved by a quick letter or short meeting, to matters of life and death.” “Without attorneys,” Hendricks wrote, “our civilized society would disintegrate . . . We cannot allow erosion of our profession.”

He advocated for an attack on the authorized practice of law, setting for several recommendations:

1. Move away from expressions of cynicism and sarcasm toward our fellow members of the Bar, in favor of mutual respect, unity and cooperation;
2. Gather credible evidence of violations of the law and present it to our local prosecutors;
3. Properly fund the Supreme Court Committee on the Unauthorized Practice of Law and actively pursue complaints against those who we believe have violated the rules;
4. Develop recommended guidelines for the disciplining of attorneys;
5. Utilize the resources of our state and local bar associations to fully investigate and expose inappropriate practices in the areas of in-person solicitation and the unauthorized practice of law;
6. Seek cooperation not only from attorneys on both sides of the Bar, but also from the insurance industry, which must cease efforts to exercise control over the legal profession; and
7. Adopt and enforce regulations that would allow tort claims to be negotiated only with the claimant, a claimant's family member, or an attorney.

== Teaching ==
Brad Hendricks, Presenter, “Ethics: Obtaining and Handling the Personal Injury Case,” presented at ATLA's Friday with the Stars Trial Advocacy Seminar, Fayetteville, Arkansas, March 10, 2006.

Ethical Issues Involved in Getting and Handling the Personal Injury Case,” presented at ATLA’s 2003 Seminar, “Maximizing Damages in the Personal Injury Case,” Tunica, MS (opining that there is an inherent conflict of interest when an attorney collects fees associated with subrogation interests, which may not be waived by a client without full knowledge of what the waiver entails).
