= Antwi Atuahene =

Ghanaian-Canadian basketball player

Personal information
- Born: December 17, 1984 (age 41) Mississauga, Ontario, Canada
- Listed height: 6 ft 3 in (1.91 m)
- Listed weight: 205 lb (93 kg)

Career information
- High school: Henry Carr (Etobicoke, Ontario)
- College: Trinity Valley CC (2004–2005); Arizona State (2005–2008)
- NBA draft: 2008: undrafted
- Playing career: 2008–present
- Position: Guard

Career history
- 2010: Leones Regios de Monterrey (Mexico)
- 2010–2011: Beltway Bombers (APBL)
- 2012–2013: London Lightning (Canada)
- 2013–2014: Island Storm (Canada)

Career highlights
- NBL Canada All-Star (2013); First-team All-NBL Canada (2013); Toronto Sun Mr. Basketball Ontario (2003)

Kwadwo Antwi Atuahene (born December 17, 1984) is a Ghanaian-Canadian professional basketball player who last played for the Island Storm of the National Basketball League of Canada (NBL).

He was a reserve at the 2013 NBL Canada All-Star Game, in which he represented the Central Division. Atuahene played college basketball with Arizona State after spending a season at Trinity Valley Community College in Athens, Texas. As a professional, he has previously competed with teams in Mexico, the United States, and Canada.
