= Seth Martinez =

American baseball player (born 1994)

Free agent
- Pitcher
- Born: August 29, 1994 (age 32); Sierra Vista, Arizona, U.S.
- Bats: Right Throws: Right

MLB debut
- September 20, 2021, for the Houston Astros

MLB statistics (through 2026 season)
- Win–loss record: 6–6
- Earned run average: 4.03
- Strikeouts: 127
- Stats at Baseball Reference

Teams
- Houston Astros (2021–2024); Miami Marlins (2025); Boston Red Sox (2026)

Seth Antonio Martinez (born August 29, 1994) is an American professional baseball pitcher who is a free agent. He has previously played in Major League Baseball (MLB) for the Houston Astros, Miami Marlins, and Boston Red Sox. Martinez played college baseball for the Arizona State Sun Devils. The Oakland Athletics selected him in the 17th round of the 2016 MLB draft. Martinez remained in the Athletics organization until the Astros selected him in the 2020 Rule 5 draft, and he made his MLB debut in 2021.

== Amateur career ==
Martinez grew up in Peoria, Arizona and attended Sunrise Mountain High School, where he played baseball and golf. Over three seasons, he posted a record of 19-4 with a 2.86 ERA and 172 strikeouts over 144 innings. In his junior year, he threw a no-hitter in his junior season and was named to the second-team All State team.

Martinez played college baseball for the Arizona State Sun Devils for three seasons. As a freshman, he pitched both as a starter and in relief, with a 5–0 record and 4.32 ERA. He played summer baseball for the Bellingham Bells. He began his sophomore season as Arizona State's mid-week starter before being made the team's number one starter after seven starts. As a junior in 2016, Martinez went 9-4 with a 2.75 ERA and 94 strikeouts over 111 1/3 innings pitched and was named to the first team All-Pac-12 Conference and a second team All-American by Louisville Slugger. His primary catcher in college was fellow future major leaguer Brian Serven.

== Professional career ==
=== Oakland Athletics ===
Martinez was selected in the 17th round of the 2016 Major League Baseball (MLB) draft by the Oakland Athletics. After signing, he was assigned to the Arizona League Athletics, where he pitched in three games. Martinez began the 2017 season with the Low-A Vermont Lake Monsters before he was promoted to the Single-A Beloit Snappers after one start. Martinez went 5–10 with a 3.49 ERA over 95 1/3 innings pitched with Beloit and returned to the team for the 2018 season. He converted to a full-time reliever in 2018, leading the Snappers with 15 saves. He began the 2019 season with the High-A Stockton Ports of the California League and was promoted to the Double-A Midland RockHounds. He had a solid 2019 season, increasing his strikeouts and reducing his ERA against higher competition with a similar workload to 2018. Martinez did not play in a game in 2020 due to the cancellation of the minor league season because of the COVID-19 pandemic.

=== Houston Astros ===
On December 10, 2020, the Houston Astros selected Martinez in the minor league phase of the Rule 5 draft and assigned him to the Triple-A Sugar Land Skeeters to start the 2021 season. He was called up for his MLB debut on September 20, 2021, when he pitched a scoreless ninth inning. After another scoreless outing, his season ended poorly, allowing 5 runs the last inning of a blowout loss to Oakland.

In the 2022 season, Martinez joined the Astros near the end of April and worked as a long reliever. He threw 17 2/3 scoreless innings to start his season before allowing a game-winning 10th inning home run to Aaron Judge. Martinez posted a 2.48 ERA over 32 2/3 innings through August 13, when he was demoted back to Triple-A. On August 25, the Astros recalled Martinez from Sugar Land. He earned his first major league win on September 15, after tossing a scoreless inning against the Athletics. In his rookie season, he was 1–1 with a 2.09 ERA in 29 games, pitching 38 2/3 innings. He did not pitch in the postseason but was part of the Astros' World Series ring ceremony the following year.

Martinez again split time between the majors and Triple-A in 2023. He earned his first major league save on June 25, pitching in the 11th inning of a win over the Los Angeles Dodgers. He had a 2–3 record and 5.23 ERA in 43 innings for the Astros, pitching more than 1 inning in 11 of his 35 MLB games. He had better results for the Skeeters, with a 2.25 ERA in 19 games.

In 2024, Martinez pitched in a career-high 44 games with the Astros, going 3–2 with 1 save and a 3.59 ERA in 52 2/3 innings, also a career high. He finished 14 games and had 36 strikeouts and a 1.272 walks plus hits per inning pitched (WHIP). He also made 13 appearances at Sugar Land in 2024, with no decisions and a 1.46 ERA.

=== Miami Marlins ===
On November 4, 2024, Martinez was claimed off waivers by the Arizona Diamondbacks. Martinez was designated for assignment by the Diamondbacks on February 17, 2025. On February 20, Martinez was claimed off waivers by the Miami Marlins. On February 27, Miami designated him for assignment after they acquired Brett de Geus. On March 2, Martinez was claimed off waivers by the Seattle Mariners. However, he was claimed back off waivers by Miami on March 15. Martinez was designated for assignment following the acquisition of Tyler Phillips on March 26. He cleared waivers and was sent outright to the Triple-A Jacksonville Jumbo Shrimp. In 41 appearances for Jacksonville, Martinez compiled a 3-2 record and 3.71 ERA with 54 strikeouts and eight saves across 43 2/3 innings pitched. On August 27, the Marlins selected Martinez's contract, adding him to their active roster. In six appearances for Miami, he recorded a 5.40 ERA with four strikeouts across 6 2/3 innings pitched. Martinez was designated for assignment by the Marlins on September 11. He elected free agency after clearing waivers on September 13.

=== Boston Red Sox ===
On January 9, 2026, Martinez signed a minor league contract with the Boston Red Sox. He made 33 appearances (including nine starts) for the Triple–A Worcester Red Sox, posting a 3–2 record and 5.55 ERA with 49 strikeouts and one save over 60 innings of work. On August 9, Boston selected Martinez's contract, adding him to their active roster. He made his only appearance for the team on August 11, allowing one run across one inning pitched against the Toronto Blue Jays. Martinez was designated for assignment by the Red Sox the following day. He cleared waivers and was sent outright to Worcester on August 14. He elected free agency on October 5.

== Personal life ==
Martinez's parents are Bobby and Kelly Martinez. He has one sister, Taylor, who is a physician. His father was a high school baseball coach.

== See also ==
- List of Arizona State University alumni
- Rule 5 draft results
