= List of Arizona State University swimmers and divers =

Arizona State University (ASU) has graduated a number of athletes. This includes graduates, non-graduate former students and current students of ASU who are notable for their achievements within athletics, sometimes before or after their time at ASU. Athletes in other sports can be found in the list of Arizona State University athletes; other alumni, including non-playing coaches and athletic administrators, can be found in the list of Arizona State University alumni.

ASU has produced 12 Olympians and an Olympic coach in diving as well as 67 Olympians in swimming, winning a total of three medals in diving and 31 in swimming. Chief among ASU alumni are Melissa Belote, who won three gold medals at the 1972 Summer Olympics, and Léon Marchand, who won four gold medals at the 2024 Summer Olympics. Bernard Wrightson is the only ASU diver to win Olympic gold.

== Diving ==
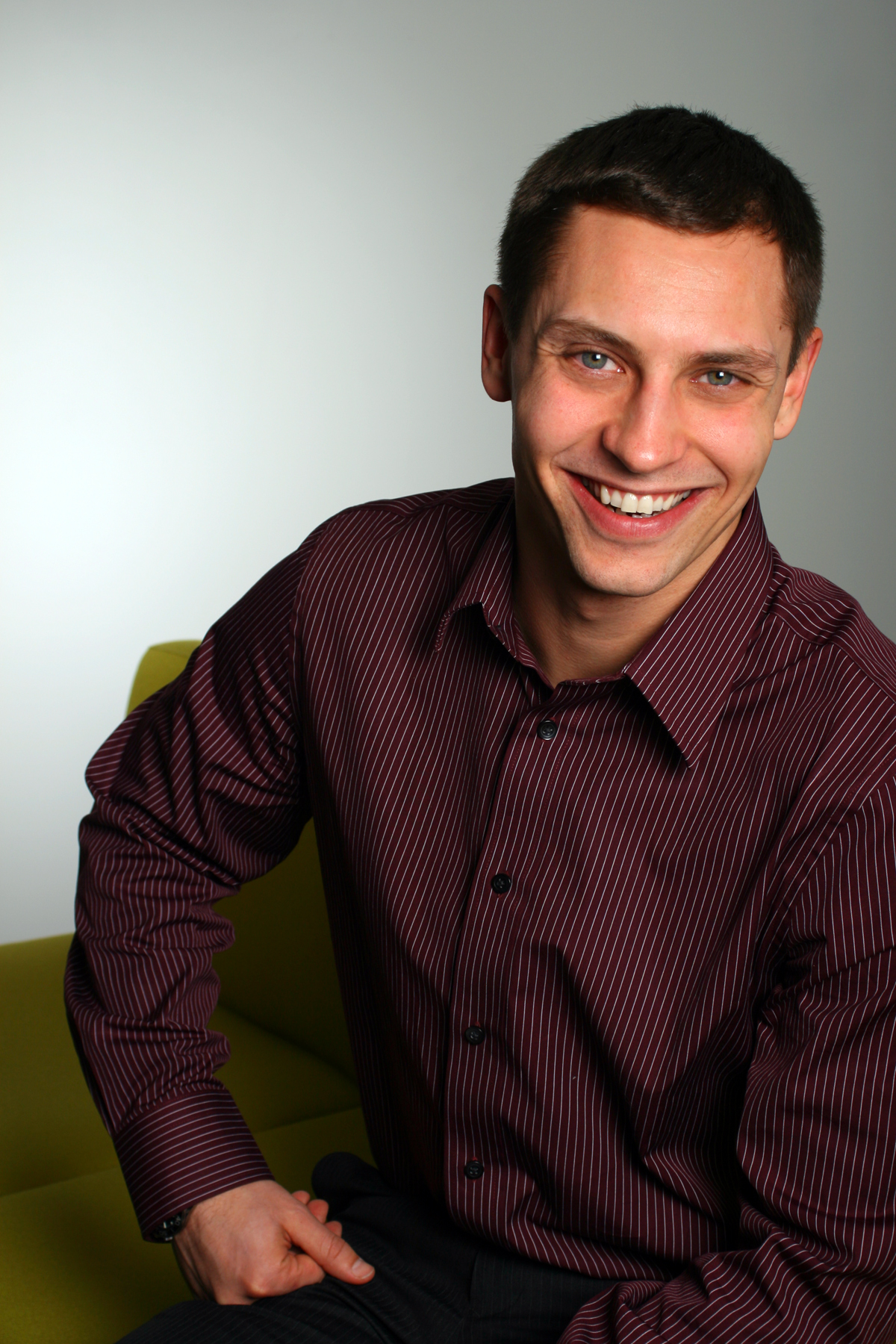
Joona Puhakka

Diving
Name	Years played at ASU	Notes	Ref.
Michele "Micky" Benedetti	2006–2009	Represented Italy at the 2012 and 2016 Summer Olympics	
Constantin Blaha		Represented Austria at the 2008 and 2016 Summer Olympics	
Tracy Cox		Represented Zimbabwe at the 1984, 1988 and 1992 Summer Olympics	
Elina Eggers		Represented Sweden at the 2008 Summer Olympics	
Riley McCormick		Represented Canada at the 2008 and 2012 Summer Olympics	
Ann Peterson	1966–1968	Medalist representing the U.S. at the 1967 Pan American Games and 1968 Summer Olympics	
Joona Puhakka	2002–2005	Four-time NCAA diving champion; represented Finland at the 2000, 2004 and 2008 Summer Olympics	
Keith Russell	1967–1968	1968 NCAA champion; represented the U.S. at the 1968 Summer Olympics	
Youssef Selim	2016–2020	Diver; represented Egypt at the 2016 Summer Olympics	
Patsy Willard	1960–1964	Eight-time national champion; represented the U.S. at the 1960 and 1964 Summer Olympics	
Bernie Wrightson	1962–1966	First ASU diver to be an NCAA champion (1966) or to win an Olympic gold medal (representing the U.S. in 1968)	

== Swimming ==
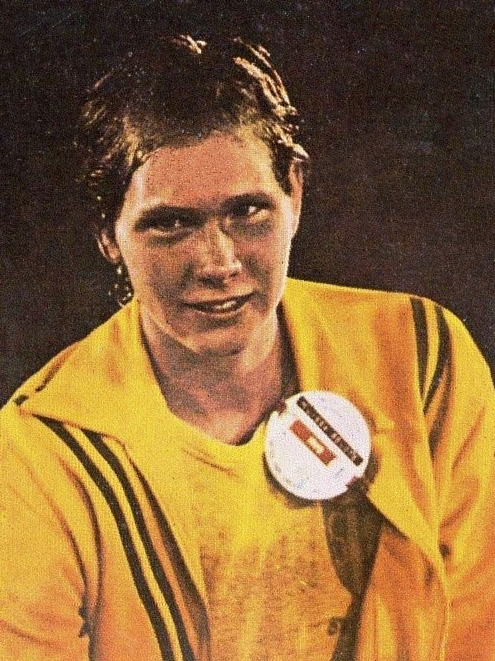
Melissa Belote

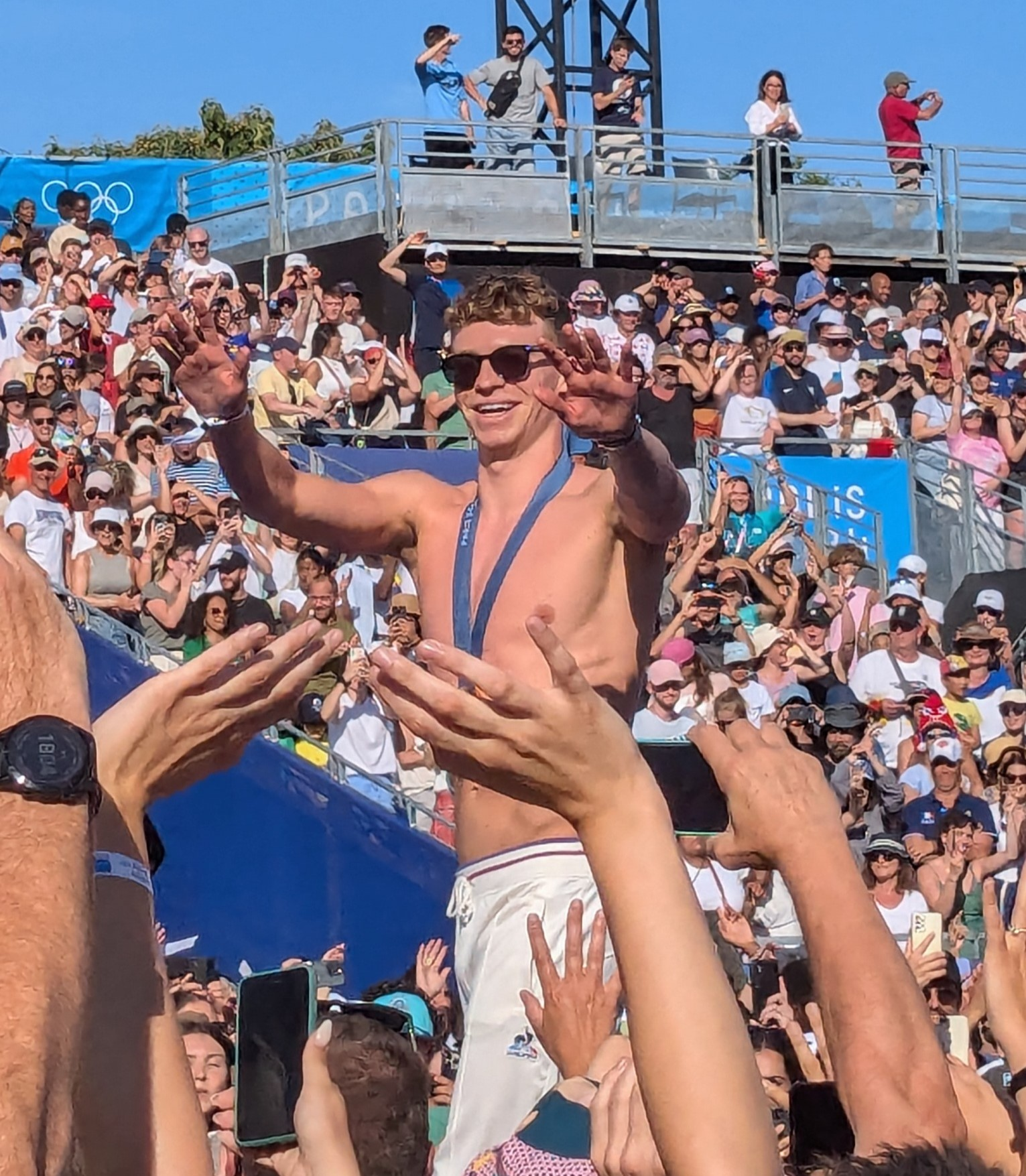
Léon Marchand

Swimming
Name	Years played at ASU	Notes	Ref.
Pablo Martín Abal		Represented Argentina at the 2000 Summer Olympics	
Reema Abdo		Represented Canada at the 1984 Summer Olympics	
Carolyn Adel		Two-time Olympian representing Suriname	
Gail Amundrud	1978–1981	Represented Canada at the 1976 Summer Olympics and 1979 Pan American Games	
Ross Anderson		Represented New Zealand at the 1988 Summer Olympics	
Jarod Arroyo	2021–2024	Represented Puerto Rico in the 2020 Summer Olympics before competing for ASU	
Andy Astbury	1979–1983	Represented Great Britain at the 1982 Commonwealth Games and 1984 Summer Olympics	
Joann Baker		Represented Canada at the 1976 Summer Olympics	
Petra Banović		Represented Croatia at the 2000 and 2004 Summer Olympics	
Melissa Belote	1975–1979	Won three gold medals in swimming at the 1972 Summer Olympics and was an Olympian in 1976	
Richard Bera		Represented Indonesia at the 1988, 1996 and 2000 Summer Olympics	
Peter Berggren		Represented Sweden at the 1984 Summer Olympics	
Richárd Bohus		Represented Hungary at the 2012 and 2016 Summer Olympics	
Nick Brunelli	2001–2004	Represented the U.S. at the 2003 Pan American Games and the 2004 and 2006 World Championships	
Leslie Cliff		Represented Canada at the 1972 Summer Olympics	
Neil Cochran		Represented Great Britain at the 1984 and 1988 Summer Olympics	
Alexandru Coci	2012–2014	Romanian swimmer	
Attila Czene	1999–2000	Represented Hungary at the 1992, 1996 and 2000 Summer Olympics	
Troy Dalbey		Represented the U.S. at the 1988 Summer Olympics	
Felipe Delgado		Represented Ecuador at the 1996 and 2000 Summer Olympics	
Robert Delgado		Represented Ecuador at the 1996 and 2000 Summer Olympics	
Paul Easter		Represented Great Britain at the 1984 Summer Olympics	
Cheryl Gibson	1978–1982	Previous to attending ASU, Olympic medalist representing Canada in 1976	
Maryanne Graham		Represented Canada at the 1976 Summer Olympics	
Steve Hardy		Represented Canada at the 1976 Summer Olympics	
Jan Henne Hawkins	1968–1972	Gold medalist at the 1968 Summer Olympics	
David Holderbach		Represented France at the 1988 and 1992 Summer Olympics	
Paul Howe		Represented Great Britain at the 1984, 1988 and 1992 Summer Olympics	
Ahmed Hussein		Represented Egypt at the 2000 and 2004 Summer Olympics	
Chloe Isleta	2016–2020	Filipino-American swimmer	
Andy Jameson		Represented Great Britain at the 1984 and 1988 Summer Olympics	
Camilla Johansson		Represented Sweden at the 2000 Summer Olympics	
Silja Känsäkoski	2017–2020	Finnish swimmer	
Dávid Kolozár		Represented Hungary at the 2004 Summer Olympics	
Ágnes Kovács		Represented Hungary at the 1996, 2000 and 2004 Summer Olympics	
Hubert Kós	2022–2024	Hungarian swimmer	
Logi Jes Kristjánsson		Represented Iceland at the 1996 Summer Olympics	
David Leblanc		Represented France at the 1988 Summer Olympics	
Therèse Lundin		Represented Sweden at the 1992 Summer Olympics	
Anders Lyrbring		Represented Sweden at the 1996 Summer Olympics	
Mohammad Madwa		Represented Kuwait at the 2008 Summer Olympics	
Riley Mants		Represented Canada at the 1996 Summer Olympics	
Léon Marchand	2021–2024	Won five medals, four gold, representing France at the 2024 Summer Olympics	
Gavin Meadows		Represented Great Britain at the 2004 Summer Olympics	
Cristiano Michelena		Represented Brazil at the 1988 and 1992 Summer Olympics	
Kendis Moore	1967–1971	Pan American Games medalist	
Anita Nall	—N/a	Olympic swimmer in 1992; graduated ASU in 2002	
Emanuel Nascimento		Represented Brazil at the 1988 and 1992 Summer Olympics	
Gal Nevo		Represented Israel at the 2008, 2012 and 2016 Summer Olympics	
Eva Nyberg		Represented Sweden at the 1988 and 1992 Summer Olympics	
Anna Olasz		Represented Hungary at the 2016 Summer Olympics	
Mikael Örn	1981–1984	1983 NCAA champion; medalist at the 1984 Summer Olympics representing Sweden	
Simon Percy		Represented New Zealand at the 1992 Summer Olympics	
Anders Peterson		Represented Sweden at the 1984 Summer Olympics	
Eduardo Piccinini		Represented Brazil at the 1992 Summer Olympics	
Renato Ramalho		Represented Brazil at the 1988 and 1992 Summer Olympics	
Iván Rodríguez Mesa		Represented Panama at the 2000 Summer Olympics	
Cierra Runge	2018–2020	Olympic medalist before transferring to ASU	
Francisco Sánchez	1996–1999	Represented Venezuela at the 1996 and 2000 Summer Olympics	
Zalán Sárkány	2022–2024	Represented Hungary at the 2024 Summer Olympics	
David Schlicht	2021–2024	Australian swimmer	
Katarina Simonović		Represented Serbia at the 2016 Summer Olympics	
Susan Sloan		Represented Canada at the 1976 Summer Olympics	
Florencia Szigeti		Represented Argentina at the 2004 Summer Olympics	
Richard Tapper		Represented New Zealand at the 1992 Summer Olympics	
Fanny Teijonsalo	2017–2019	Finnish swimmer	
Graham Welbourn		Named to the 1980 Canadian Olympic team (Note: Did not compete because of the 1980 Summer Olympics boycott.)	
David "Tolu" Young		Represented Fiji at the 2024 Summer Olympics	
Mel Zajac		Represented Canada at the 1976 Summer Olympics	
