= Attorney General Ryan =

Attorney General Ryan may refer to:

- Jim Ryan (politician) (born 1946), Attorney General of Illinois
- T. J. Ryan (1876–1921), Attorney-General of Queensland
- William H. Ryan Jr., Attorney General of Pennsylvania

== See also ==
- General Ryan (disambiguation)
