= John J. Batbie Jr. =

United States Air Force general

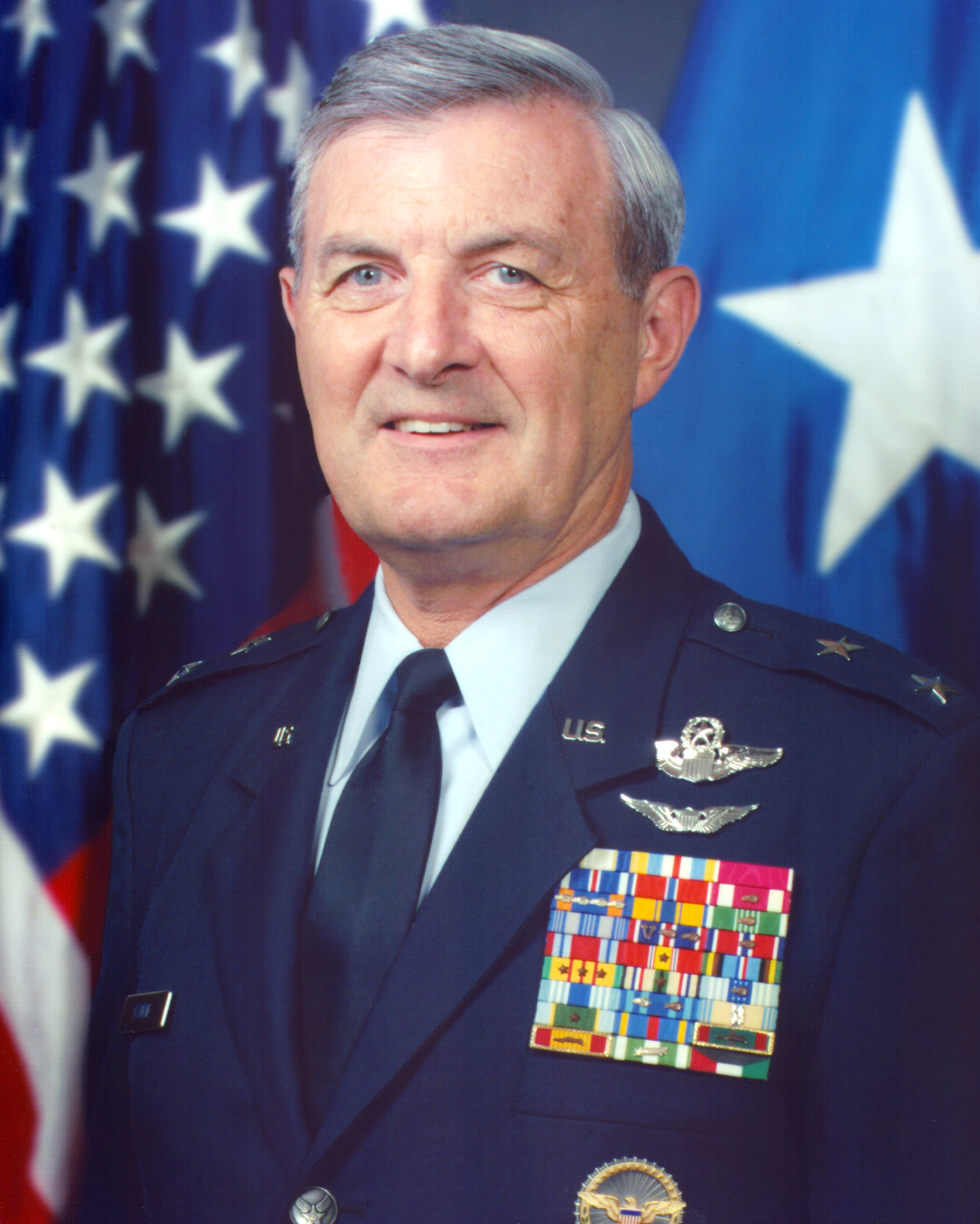
- Born: October 16, 1946 (age 79); San Francisco, California, U.S.
- Military career
- Allegiance: United States of America
- Branch: United States Air Force
- Service years: 1966–2005
- Rank: Major general
- Awards: Distinguished Service Medal, Defense Superior Service Medal, Legion of Merit, Distinguished Flying Cross, Bronze Star Medal, Meritorious Service Medal with oak leaf cluster, Air Medal with four silver oak leaf clusters, Air Force Commendation Medal

John J. Batbie Jr. (born October 16, 1946) was a major general in the United States Air Force who served as commander of the United States Air Force Reserve Command, Headquarters U.S. Air Force, Washington D.C., and commander, Headquarters Air Force Reserve, a separate operating agency located at Robins Air Force Base, Georgia. As chief of Air Force Reserve, he served as the principal adviser on Reserve matters to the Air Force Chief of Staff. As commander of AFRES, he had full responsibility for the supervision of U.S. Air Force Reserve units around the world. He served in this position from November 1994 to June 1998.

Batbie joined the U.S. Army in 1966 and served as an armor officer and helicopter pilot before joining the Air Force Reserve in 1972. He flew helicopters until 1979 when he graduated from the Air Force Fixed Wing Qualification Course at Sheppard Air Force Base, Texas. He was named outstanding graduate and received the Robert C. Swanson Memorial Award. In 1983, the general was the first Air Force Reserve officer to be assigned to Europe as a Reserve statutory tour officer. He coordinated Reserve affairs in both the plans and operations directorates, and served as negotiator for the establishment of collocated operating bases in Greece and Turkey.

Batbie has held numerous supervisory and command positions, including director of operations; commander of a squadron, group, wing and numbered air force; director of mobilization and reserve component affairs for U.S. European Command; and, for a limited time, commander of the Air Force Reserve Command.

His awards include the Distinguished Service Medal, Defense Superior Service Medal, Legion of Merit, Distinguished Flying Cross, Bronze Star Medal, Meritorious Service Medal with oak leaf cluster, Air Medal with four silver oak leaf clusters, and the Air Force Commendation Medal.

== Education ==
- 1973 Bachelor of Arts degree in business administration, Arizona State University, Tempe
- 1976 Air Command and Staff College, Maxwell AFB, Alabama
- 1977 Industrial College of the Armed Forces, Fort Lesley J. McNair, Washington, D.C.
- 1990 Master of Arts degree in business administration, Louisiana Tech University, Ruston

== Assignments ==
- September 1967 – October 1968, training officer, I Corps, Camp Red Cloud, South Korea
- October 1968 – December 1968, platoon leader, 3rd Armored Cavalry Regiment, Fort Lewis, Washington
- January 1969 – October 1969, student, Army Basic Helicopter Course, Fort Wolters, Texas, Hunter Army Airfield, Ga., and Fort Rucker, Alabama
- November 1969 – January 1970, student, AH-1G Cobra Course, Hunter Army Airfield, Georgia
- February 1970 – February 1971, Cobra weapons platoon leader and operations officer, 101st Airborne Division, Quang Tri, South Vietnam
- March 1971 – February 1972, staff officer, 101st Airborne Division, Fort Campbell, Kentucky
- October 1972 – January 1979, HH-34J and CH-3E helicopter instructor pilot, 302nd Air Rescue and Recovery Squadron, Air Force Reserve, Luke AFB, Arizona
- January 1979 – August 1979, student, fixed wing course, Sheppard AFB, Texas
- August 1979 – October 1983, A-37 and A-10 pilot, group training officer, instructor pilot and executive officer, 917th Tactical Fighter Group, Barksdale AFB, Louisiana
- November 1983 – January 1986, staff officer, Headquarters U.S. Air Forces in Europe, Ramstein Air Base, West Germany
- January 1986 – August 1987, assistant director of operations, 452nd Air Refueling Wing, March AFB, California
- August 1987 – April 1988, commander of 79th Air Refueling Squadron, March AFB, California
- April 1988 – July 1991, commander of 916th Air Refueling Group, Seymour Johnson AFB, North Carolina
- July 1991 – June 1994, commander of 434th Air Refueling Wing, Grissom AFB, Indiana
- June 1994 – September 1998, director of plans and programs, Air Force Reserve Command, Robins AFB, Georgia
- September 1998 – May 2000, commander of 22nd Air Force, Dobbins Air Reserve Base, Georgia
- May 2000 – November 2001, director for mobilization and reserve component affairs, U.S. European Command, Stuttgart, Germany
- November 2001 – 2005, vice commander of Air Force Reserve Command, Robins AFB, Georgia (June 1, 2004 – June 23, 2004, Commander, Air Force Reserve Command, Robins AFB, Georgia)
