= Arkansas Bar Association =

Voluntary bar association of Arkansas, USA

- Type: Legal Society
- Headquarters: Little Rock, AR
- Location: United States
- Members: 5,638 in 2012 (694 out of state)
- Website: http://www.arkbar.com/

The Arkansas Bar Association is the voluntary (non-mandatory) bar association of the U.S. state of Arkansas.

== History ==
As early as 1837, there were efforts to organize association of lawyers in Arkansas, but it was not until 1898 that the Arkansas State Bar was organized. Its first president was Uriah Milton Rose, whose name would come to grace the state's oldest and most prestigious legal enterprise, Rose Law Firm.

== Structure ==
The Arkansas Bar Association publishes the quarterly Arkansas Lawyer Magazine, the weekly "E-bulletins," and other publications.

The Arkansas Bar Association does not control lawyer licensing; that is a function of the Arkansas Board of Law Examiners. It does not enforce the requirement that Arkansas lawyers must complete 12 credits of Continuing Legal Education each year.; that is the function of the Arkansas Continuing Legal Education Board
