= Circuito de Basquetbol del Noreste =

- Sport: Basketball
- Founded: 2010
- CEO: (Mexico) Harold Valenzuela
- No. of teams: 6
- Country: Mexico
- Continent: FIBA Americas (Americas)
- Most recent champion: Madereros de Durango
- Website: www.cibane.org

The Circuito de Basquetbol del Noreste, "CIBANE" was a professional basketball league in Northeastern Mexico. CIBANE was founded in 2010 with 6 teams. The main purpose of this league is to give Mexican players the opportunity to showcase their talents, while maintaining a high level of basketball. After low funds forced league officials to cancel the 2014 season, the league was indefinitely suspended in December of that year.

== Rules ==
There are some specific rules to ensure that Mexican players have the opportunity to play, like allowing only two non-Mexican born players per team. Some other rules are having a trade deadline so the league stays competitive until the end of the season, finally, the CIBANE league has applied a hard salary cap to maintain fair rosters and promote the use of young local players.

== Current Teams ==
- Mineros de Fresnillo (Fresnillo, Zacatecas)
- Tuzos UAZ Cemozac (Zacatecas, Zacatecas)
- Guerreros de Apodaca (Apodaca, Nuevo León)
- Cuervos de Pabellón de Arteaga (Pabellón de Arteaga, Aguascalientes)

== Former Teams ==
- Acereros de Monclova (Monclova, Coahuila)
- Águilas de Piedras Negras (Piedras Negras, Coahuila)
- Caktus de Saltillo (Saltillo, Coahuila)
- Marqueteros de Linares (relocated to Apodaca, Nuevo León)

== League Champions ==
Season	Champion	Runner-up
2010	Mineros de Fresnillo	Madereros de Durango
2011	Madereros de Durango	Mineros de Fresnillo
2012	Mineros de Fresnillo	Cuervos de Pabellón de Arteaga
2013	Tuzos UAZ Cemozac	Mineros de Fresnillo

== Award winners ==
Awards were given according to basketball specialized website eurobasket.com

Season	Name	Award	Team
2011	Tyronne Beale	MVP	Mineros de Fresnillo
2011	Jesús Quintero	Coach of the year	Madereros de Durango
2010	Glenn Stokes	MVP	Mineros de Fresnillo
2010	Eliciel Collazo	Coach of the year	Mineros de Fresnillo

== Related links/Sources ==
- Official League Site
