= Yandy.com =

American fashion company

Yandy.com of PEI Holdings
- Industry: Women's apparel, lingerie
- Founded: 2007
- Founders: Chad Horstman; Evan Horstman
- Successor: Aras Koktas (CEO)
- Headquarters: Phoenix, Arizona
- Key people: Pilar Quintana (Chief Merchandising Officer)
- Products: Lingerie, Halloween Costumes, Swimwear, Activewear
- Website: www.yandy.com

Yandy.com is an American online retailer and fashion design company focusing on lingerie, swimwear, Halloween costumes, and women's apparel.

== History ==
Yandy.com is an online women's intimates apparel retailer, originally based out of the residence of its co-founders. The company was founded in 2007 by Chad Horstman and his brother Evan in Scottsdale, Arizona. By 2018 the company employed over 80 full-time employees and occupies a 30,000 sq ft (2,800 m^{2}) warehouse.

Chad Horstman served as the company's CEO from its founding until 2017 and remains a member of its board of directors. In October 2017, the company elevated its CTO Aras Koktas and CFO Jeffrey Watton to Co-CEO titles.

The firm first sold exclusively lingerie but expanded to Halloween costumes in their first year. In 2010, it began selling its own branded costumes. It now creates lingerie, everyday intimates, Halloween costumes, swimwear, and other women's apparel. Halloween costumes have included looks inspired by political figures, celebrities, memes, cultural events, and popular culture trends, along with conventional Halloween themes.

In December 2019, Yandy was purchased by Playboy Enterprises.

In April 2023, Yandy was acquired by ASP Retail Group led by company's former CEO, Aras Koktas. Koktas has returned to the operation as the chief executive after 2 years serving as the Chief Digital Officer at DollsKill.

== Fashion shows and partnerships ==
=== Fashion Shows ===
The firm's swimwear collections have been shown at New York Fashion Week, Miami Swim Week, and Scottsdale Fashion Week. It also produced the first Halloween costume fashion show at New York Fashion Week in September 2016, featuring 39 costumes.

=== Partnerships ===
In 2017, the firm became the swimsuit sponsor for the 2017 Miss USA Pageant, providing the swimsuits for each of the contestants, later selling each design through its website. The swimsuits were designed by Pilar Quintana-Williams, the company's Director of Merchandising. In July 2017, the company received licensing for their Baywatch swimwear collection.

== Criticism ==
=== Brave Red Maiden Costume ===
In September 2018, Yandy.com introduced a costume they called "Brave Red Maiden" which was apparent that it had been designed as a "sexy" knockoff from The Handmaid's Tale. Several news sources picked up the story and criticized the choice to create and sell this costume.

== Key people ==
=== Chad Horstman ===
Chad Horstman (born in 1978) is an American ecommerce entrepreneur best known as the founder of Yandy.com. He started the company in his garage with his brother, Evan Horstman, before selling the company to private equity firm SPK Capital.

Horstman is the creator of various "sexy" Halloween costumes and is often credited as the person that started the trend of making pop culture events into "sexy" costumes. Some of his creations include Sexy Ken Bone, the famous undecided voter in the 2016 presidential election, Sexy Pizza Rat and Sexy Pizza which was featured by Jon Stewart on The Daily Show, Sexy Big Bird after Mitt Romney threatened to cut funding to PBS and #The Dress, after the viral blue and white dress image where people saw different colors.

Horstman actively supports Foundation Fighting Blindness and the Joy Bus, a local charitable organization that delivers meals to cancer patients. Horstman graduated from Arizona State University and resides in Scottsdale, Arizona.
