= Christian Hageseth =

American entrepreneur and advocate

Christian Hageseth is an American entrepreneur, author, marijuana rights advocate and business owner. He was born in Pensacola, Florida, and grew up in Fort Collins, Colorado. He graduated from Arizona State University in 1992 with a degree in Political Science. He is the founder of Green Man Cannabis and American Cannabis Partners. Hageseth is the author of Big Weed: An Entrepreneur's High Stakes Adventures in the Budding Legal Marijuana Business, published in 2015 by Macmillan.

== Author ==
In 2015, Hageseth published his first book, Big Weed: An Entrepreneur's High Stakes Adventures in the Budding Legal Marijuana Business (Macmillan, 2015) with co-author Joseph D’Agnese. Through Big Weed, Hageseth paints a picture of the evolution of legal marijuana, describing his journey from complete newcomer in 2009 to winning multiple Cannabis Cups (the industry's highest award for product excellence) and planning the Colorado Cannabis Ranch. He concludes the book with his predictions for the future of the industry, based on his own experience.

== Entrepreneur ==
=== American Cannabis Partners ===
Hageseth is the President of American Cannabis Partners (ACP), a consulting business in the legal cannabis industry that "brings years of experience as owners, operators, and investors". As of 2016 (the website has not been updated since), this business's priorities were assistance with licensing for growing or dispensing legal cannabis, helping to create cultivation facilities, and aid in operating cannabis dispensaries. In this capacity, Hageseth has also spoken at several industry events around the US and in Canada about the industry and his own life.

=== Colorado Cannabis Ranch ===
Hageseth, as of 2016, was working on the Colorado Cannabis Ranch, which was designed to be the world's first "weedery" – similar to the concept of a winery or brewery but for legal marijuana. Hageseth was developing this project through his company American Cannabis Partners. The aim of the Colorado Cannabis Ranch was to demystify and de-stigmatize legal cannabis, and also set new standards in cultivation. The vision of the project was that the Ranch would allow visitors to tour a legal marijuana cultivation center for the first time. Hageseth also planned for an on-site restaurant and bar, and an amphitheater to be part of the experience.

=== Green Man Cannabis ===
Hageseth founded Green Man Cannabis, a legal marijuana cultivation and retail business, in 2009. Until 2015, Green Man Cannabis cultivated and sold medical marijuana only. In 2015, the company was licensed to cultivate and sell both medical and recreational marijuana. Green Man Cannabis has two retail locations in Denver, CO. The business has won multiple awards, including six High Times Cannabis Cups – an award for product excellence.

==== Green Man Cannabis Awards ====
2016 Cannabis Cup

- 1st Place Colorado Sativa -Ghost Train Haze
- 1st Place Colorado Hybrid -Star Killer

2015 THC Championship

- Grand Champion -Star Killer
- 1st Place Recreational Hybrid -Motor Breath
- 2nd Place Recreational Indica -Hell's OG
- 2nd Place Recreational Sativa -Ghost Train Haze
- 1st Place Medical Hybrid -Star Killer
- 2nd Place Medical Sativa -Moonshine Haze
- Connoisseur's Choice - Best Tested- Motor Breath
- Best Tested- Hell's OG
- People's Choice - Connoisseur's Choice - Best Tested- Star Killer
- Best Tested -Moonshine Haze

2015 Cannabis Cup

- 1st Place Colorado Sativa -Ghost Train Haze
- 1st Place Colorado Indica -Louie OG
- 2nd Place Colorado Hybrid -Star Killer

2015 Rooster Colorado Cup

- Grand Champion -Star Killer
- 1st Place Hybrid -Star Killer
- 1st Place Sativa -Ghost Train Haze

2014 THC Championship

- 1st Place Medical Sativa– Ghost Train Haze
- 1st Place Medical Indica– Hell's OG Kush
- 1st Place Medical Hybrid– Star Killer
- Best Tested Medical Sativa – Ghost Train Haze
- Patient's Choice Medical Indica – Hell's OG Kush
- Best Tested Medical Indica – Hell's OG Kush
- Patient's Choice Medical Hybrid – Star Killer

2014 Cannabis Cup

- 1st Place Sativa, Best Sativa in the US -Ghost Train Haze

2012 Cannabis Cup

- 1st Place Hybrid - Skunkberry

2012 Rooster Colorado Cup

- 1st Place Sativa - Jack Herer
- 3rd Place Sativa - Super Lemon Haze
- 3rd Place Indica - Hell's OG Kush
