= Hailey Davidson (golfer) =

American golfer

Personal information
- Born: 1991 or 1992 (age 33–34) Scotland
- Education: Wilmington University, Christopher Newport
- Years active: 2021–present

Sport
- Sport: Golf

Hailey Davidson is a Scottish-born American golfer.

== Early life and education ==
Davidson was born in Scotland and emigrated to the United States with her parents at age five. She was born with clubfoot, and as a child underwent multiple surgeries to correct it.

Davidson had a full scholarship in men's golf at Division II Wilmington University in Delaware before transferring to Division III Christopher Newport in Virginia to play men's golf, finally finishing her degree online with Arizona State in 2014.

== Professional career ==
Davidson has played golf professionally in the LPGA and NXXT under former rules which allowed players assigned male at birth who had transitioned and whose testosterone levels were below certain levels. In 2021, she won a mini-tour event. In 2024, she failed by a single shot to qualify for the U.S. Women's Open.

=== Disqualifications ===
In March 2024, NXXT disqualified Davidson under rules specifying all players must have been assigned female at birth. In December 2024, the LPGA and USGA disqualified her from 2025 tournaments and championships under new rules that barred players who had neither been assigned female at birth nor undergone transition prior to experiencing male puberty. Davidson criticized both rules changes.

== Personal life ==
Davidson is transgender. She began hormone treatments in 2015 and had gender-affirming surgery in 2021.

== See also ==
- Mianne Bagger
- Transgender people in sports
