= Robert Maloy =

United States Air Force officer

Robert W. Maloy
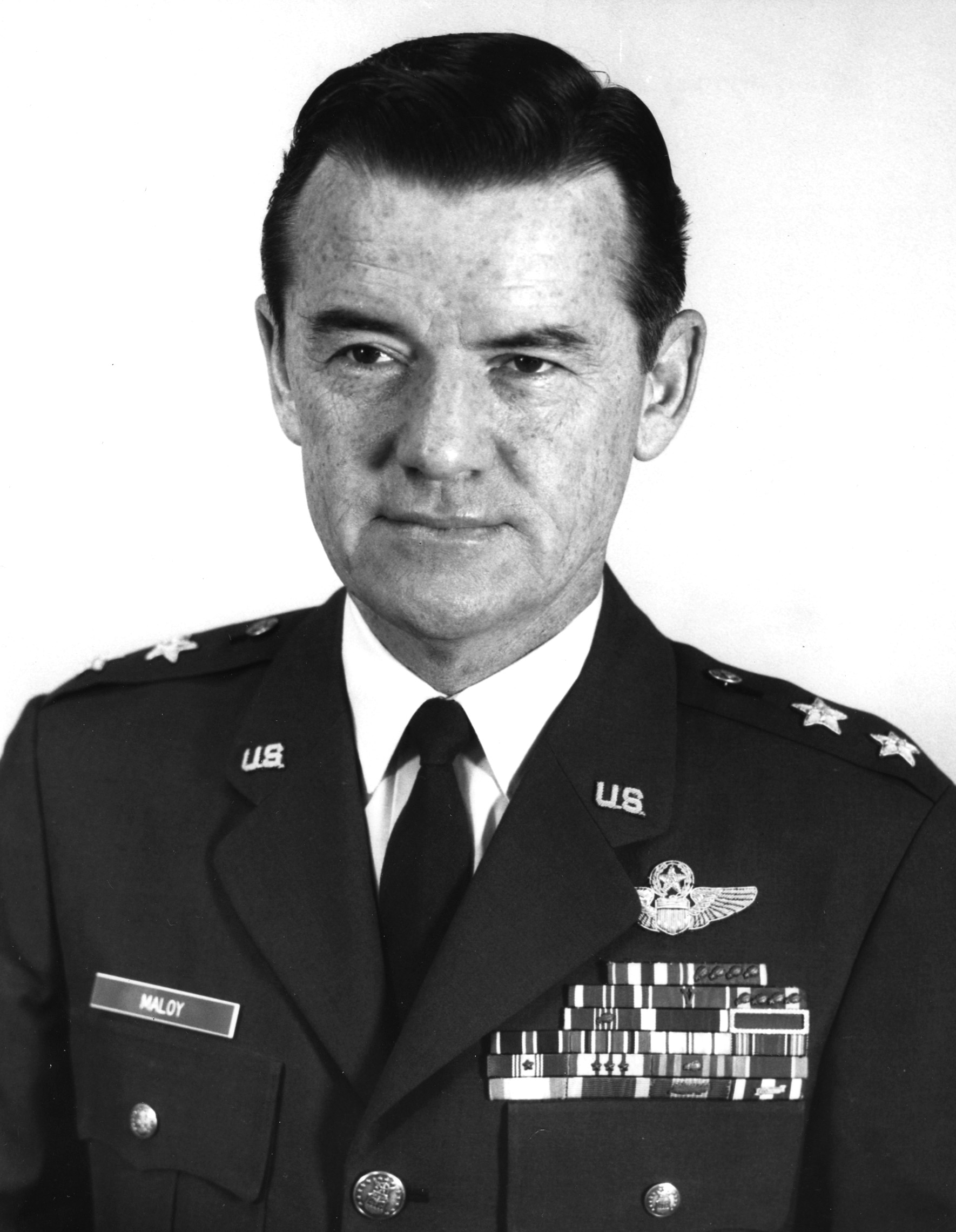
- Born: 14 February 1924; Charleston, Illinois
- Died: 14 November 1995 (aged 71)
- Burial place: Fort Sam Houston National Cemetery
- Military career
- Allegiance: United States of America
- Branch: United States Army Air Forces; United States Air Force
- Service years: 1943–1975
- Rank: Major General
- Commands: Air Force Military Training Center; Seventeenth Air Force; 314th Air Division; 366th Tactical Fighter Wing; 33rd Tactical Fighter Wing; 7416th Support Squadron; 7th Tactical Fighter Squadron
- Conflicts: World War II; Vietnam War
- Awards: Distinguished Service Medal; Silver Star; Legion of Merit (5); Distinguished Flying Cross; Bronze Star with "v" Air Medal (6); Army Commendation Medal (2); Purple Heart; Honor Medal; Gallantry Cross with Palm; Yeng Hi; Order of National Security Merit Cheon-Su.

Major General Robert W. Maloy (26 November 1924 – 14 November 1995) was a United States Air Force officer who served in World War II and the Vietnam War.

== Early life ==
He was born in Charleston, Illinois, on 14 February 1924. He graduated from Community High School, Granite City, Illinois in 1942, and attended Arizona State University until he entered active military service as an aviation cadet in 1943 at Santa Ana, California.

== Military service ==
He received his pilot wings and commission as Second lieutenant at Luke Field, Arizona in 1944. He volunteered for and immediately began night fighter training in the P-61 Black Widow.

In June 1945 he arrived in western China and was assigned to the 426th Night Fighter Squadron. At the end of World War II, he remained in China to train Republic of China Air Force pilots as a member of the China-Liaison Mission, a forerunner of the Military Assistance Advisory Group to China. In 1946 he became assistant air attache with the U.S. Embassy in Nanking, China.

In August 1948 he reported to Eglin Air Force Base, Florida, where he served as a test pilot and squadron operations officer and in 1949 attended the Air Tactical School at Tyndall Air Force Base, Florida. During 1953 he attended the Royal Air Force Staff College, Bracknell, England, and returned to the United States in January 1954 for assignment to the Directorate of Plans, Headquarters U.S. Air Force.

In August 1958 he assumed command of the 7th Tactical Fighter Squadron of the 49th Tactical Fighter Wing at Etain Air Base, France and in August 1959 moved the squadron to Spangdahlem Air Base, West Germany. In June 1960 he was assigned to U.S. Air Forces in Europe as liaison officer in Rabat, Morocco, and commander of the 7416th Support Squadron. He entered the National War College, Washington, D.C., in August 1961.

In June 1962 he was assigned as deputy chief and later as chief of the Colonels Group, Deputy Chief of Staff, Personnel, Headquarters U.S. Air Force. He assumed command of the 33rd Tactical Fighter Wing at Eglin Air Force Base in August 1966.

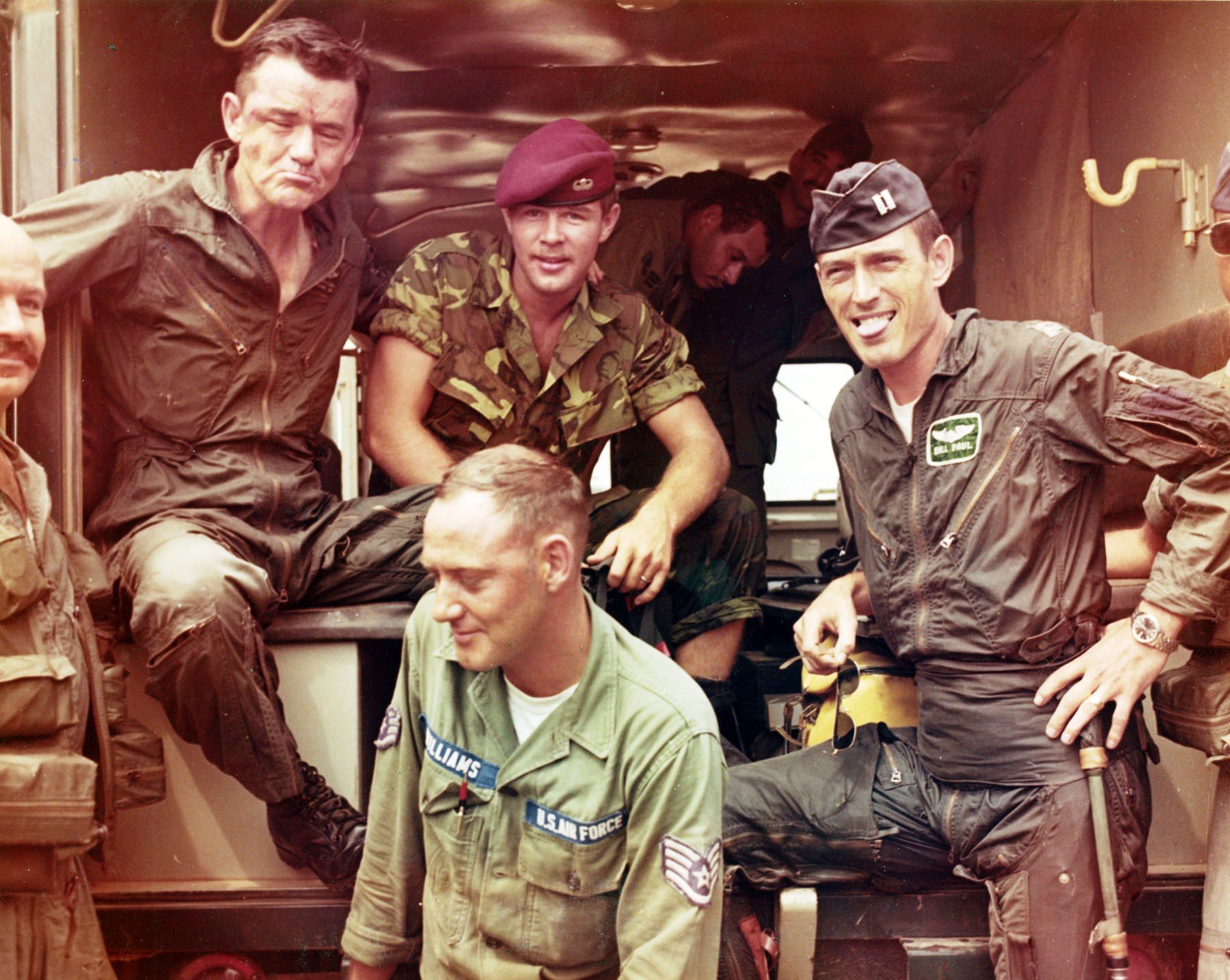
Then Col Robert Maloy (left) and Capt William S. Paul (right) after being rescued by Pararescueman A1C Roger Klenovich (center)

In May 1967 he moved to Da Nang Air Base, South Vietnam, where he commanded the 366th Tactical Fighter Wing. In October 1967 he was leading an air strike against targets in North Vietnam when his F-4 Phantom was hit. He made it to the sea, where he and his pilot ejected and were picked up by an HH-3E helicopter of the 37th Aerospace Rescue and Recovery Squadron. He broke his neck during the ejection.

After recovering from a broken neck, he was assigned in February 1968 as the deputy assistant, Deputy Chief of Staff, Personnel for Military Personnel, Headquarters U.S. Air Force, at the U.S. Air Force Military Personnel Center, Randolph Air Force Base, Texas.

In February 1970 he was transferred to South Korea, where he assumed command of the 314th Air Division, Fifth Air Force, in May 1970. His other responsibilities were: chief, Air Force Advisory Group (MAAG), Korea; commander, Korean Air Defense Sector; commander, Air Forces Korea; and Air Force adviser to the senior member, United Nations Command, Military Armistice Commission, Korea. he was promoted to Major General on 1 August 1970.

In July 1972 he was transferred to Ramstein Air Base, West Germany, where he assumed command of the Seventeenth Air Force and in October 1972 moved with the Headquarters to Sembach Air Base, West Germany.

He went to Lackland Air Force Base, Texas, in June 1973 as commander of the Air Force Military Training Center; and in August 1974 assumed duties as vice commander of Air Training Command.

He retired from the Air Force on 1 September 1975 with the rank of Major General.

== Later life ==
Robert Maloy died on 14 November 1995 and is buried at Fort Sam Houston National Cemetery.

== Decorations ==
His military decorations and awards include the Distinguished Service Medal; Silver Star; Legion of Merit with four oak leaf clusters; Distinguished Flying Cross; Bronze Star with "V" device; Air Medal with five oak leaf clusters; Army Commendation Medal with oak leaf cluster; Purple Heart; Distinguished Unit Citation Emblem; Republic of Vietnam Honor Medal and Gallantry Cross with Palm; Chinese Air Force Yeng Hi; and the Republic of Korea Order of National Security Merit Cheon-Su.
