= Willie Atwood =

American basketball player (born 1994)

No. 2 – BC Yambol
- Position: Power forward
- League: National Basketball League

Personal information
- Born: February 15, 1994 (age 32) Memphis, Tennessee, U.S.
- Listed height: 6 ft 7 in (2.01 m)
- Listed weight: 215 lb (98 kg)

Career information
- High school: Melrose (Memphis, Tennessee)
- College: Connors State (2012–2014); Arizona State (2014–2016)
- NBA draft: 2016: undrafted
- Playing career: 2016–present

Career history
- 2016–2017: SAM Basket
- 2017–2018: Enonis Neon Paralimni
- 2018–2019: Surrey Scorchers
- 2019–2020: Kapfenberg Bulls
- 2020–present: BC Yambol

Career highlights
- Third-team All-NJCAA (2014)

Willie Atwood (born February 15, 1994) is an American professional basketball player for BC Yambol of the Bulgarian National Basketball League.

== College career ==
Atwood spent two years playing at Connors State College and was named third-team All-NJCAA in his sophomore year. He joined the Arizona State Sun Devils in his junior year, and during the 2014–15 season averaged 3.0 points, 0.4 assists, 1.7 rebounds and 0.2 steals per game. For the 2015–16 season, he averaged an improved 8.4 points, 1.4 assists, 4.3 rebounds and 0.5 steals per game.

== Professional career ==
Atwood graduated from Arizona State University in 2016, and after going undrafted in the 2016 NBA draft, turned professional with Swiss Basketball League team SAM Basket. He averaged 8.4 points per game and finished the season with the third highest three-point percentage in the league.

He later moved to Cypriot club Enosis Neon Paralimni and averaged 11.0 points per game during the 2017–18 Cyprus Basketball Division A campaign.

In August 2018, Atwood signed for the Surrey Scorchers ahead of the 2018–19 British Basketball League season.

On August 5, 2019, Atwood signed with the Kapfenberg Bulls in the Austrian Basketball Bundesliga. He averaged 8.1 points, 4.6 rebounds and 1.0 assist per game, helping the team win the Supercup. On October 5, 2020, Atwood signed with BC Yambol of the Bulgarian National Basketball League.

== The Basketball Tournament ==
Willie Atwood played for the Golden Eagles in the 2018 edition of The Basketball Tournament. In 5 games, he averaged .4 points, 2 rebounds, and .8 steals per game. The Golden Eagles reached the semi-finals before falling to Overseas Elite.
