= Legend City =

Former amusement park in Arizona

- Interactive map of Legend City
- Location: Phoenix, Arizona, United States
- Coordinates: 33.447°N 111.958°W
- Status: Defunct
- Opened: June 29, 1963
- Closed: 1983
- Owner: Louis E. Crandall
- Website: Official website

Legend City was an amusement park that existed on the border of Phoenix and Tempe, Arizona, from its opening on June 29, 1963, to its closing and demolition in 1983.

== History ==
Originally conceived as an Old West theme park in the mold of Disneyland by Phoenix artist and advertising agency owner Louis E. Crandall, Legend City endured a series of closings, bankruptcies and ownership changes throughout the 1960s and 1970s, and was never a significant financial success. Nevertheless, Legend City is still remembered fondly and held in high regard by locals who knew and frequented the park in its heyday.

Legend City opened to much public fanfare on June 29, 1963, but rapidly fell into financial difficulty and went bankrupt after only six months. Crandall departed as president, and the first of several ownership changes then ensued. The property was purchased by Sam Shoen of U-Haul and opened as a theme park. U-Haul's private advertising agency, A&M Associates, handled the 'rebirth' to a theme park for children. This was probably the park's most successful period. Mr. Shoen lost interest in the park and it was eventually sold to the Mitsubishi Corporation out of Japan as a show park where the company's amusement rides could be featured to prospective buyers. The park was deserted by the Japanese owners and left to ruin. The Capell family, who had been in the carnival business for many years, then bought the property but were unable to restore Legend City to its former glory. The land was eventually purchased in 1982 by the Salt River Project, which closed the park permanently after the 1983 season. Legend City was then dismantled and razed to the ground to make way for new corporate offices for SRP.

Legend City featured several popular and memorable attractions such as the Lost Dutchman Mine ride, Cochise's Stronghold river ride, Sky Ride, Penny Arcade, Miniature Golf, Log Jammer, and Iron Horse on the 3 ft (914 mm) narrow gauge Legend City Railroad. Local kids' TV show hosts Wallace and Ladmo appeared at Legend City virtually every weekend for the entire run of the park. Vonda Kay Van Dyke, later Miss America 1965, performed a popular ventriloquism act in the early days at the park's Golden Palace Saloon. It was also home to the 1000 ft long 'Pipeline', an early form of skateboarding skatepark with a gently inclined and twisting track, added in 1965.

With the absence of Legend City, Metro Phoenix, one of the largest metropolitan areas in the United States, remains devoid of a major amusement park. The current largest amusement park in the metro area is Castles N' Coasters. Mattel Adventure Park is currently under construction in Glendale.

== See also ==
- Lost Dutchman's Gold Mine legend, inspiration for the Lost Dutchman Mine ride
- Cochise § Capture, escape and retirement, inspiration for the Cochise's Stronghold ride
