= Louis E. Crandall =

American businessman

- Born: July 27, 1929; Mesa, Arizona, U.S.
- Died: September 11, 2016 (aged 87); Provo, Utah, U.S.
- Education: Arizona State University
- Spouses: Mable Jane Austin; Ethel Marie Tangren
- Parent(s): Louis Packer and Louise Marie (Crismon) Crandall

Louis Eugene Crandall (July 27, 1929 – September 11, 2016) was an American printer and entrepreneur. He founded Legend City and the Crandall Historical Printing Museum.

== Biography ==
Crandall was born July 27, 1929, in Mesa, Arizona, to Louis Packer Crandall and Louise Marie Crismon. He obtained his undergraduate degree from Arizona State University, and in 1963 at age 28, he founded Legend City, an amusement park in Phoenix. The park struggled financially and Crandall was forced out of management before the park's closing in 1983.

Crandall went on to create the Crandall Historical Printing Museum in Provo, Utah, which tells the history of printing, especially with regards to the printing of the Bible, the United States Declaration of Independence, and the Book of Mormon. Crandall was a member of The Church of Jesus Christ of Latter-day Saints.
