= Michael A. Ryan =

United States general

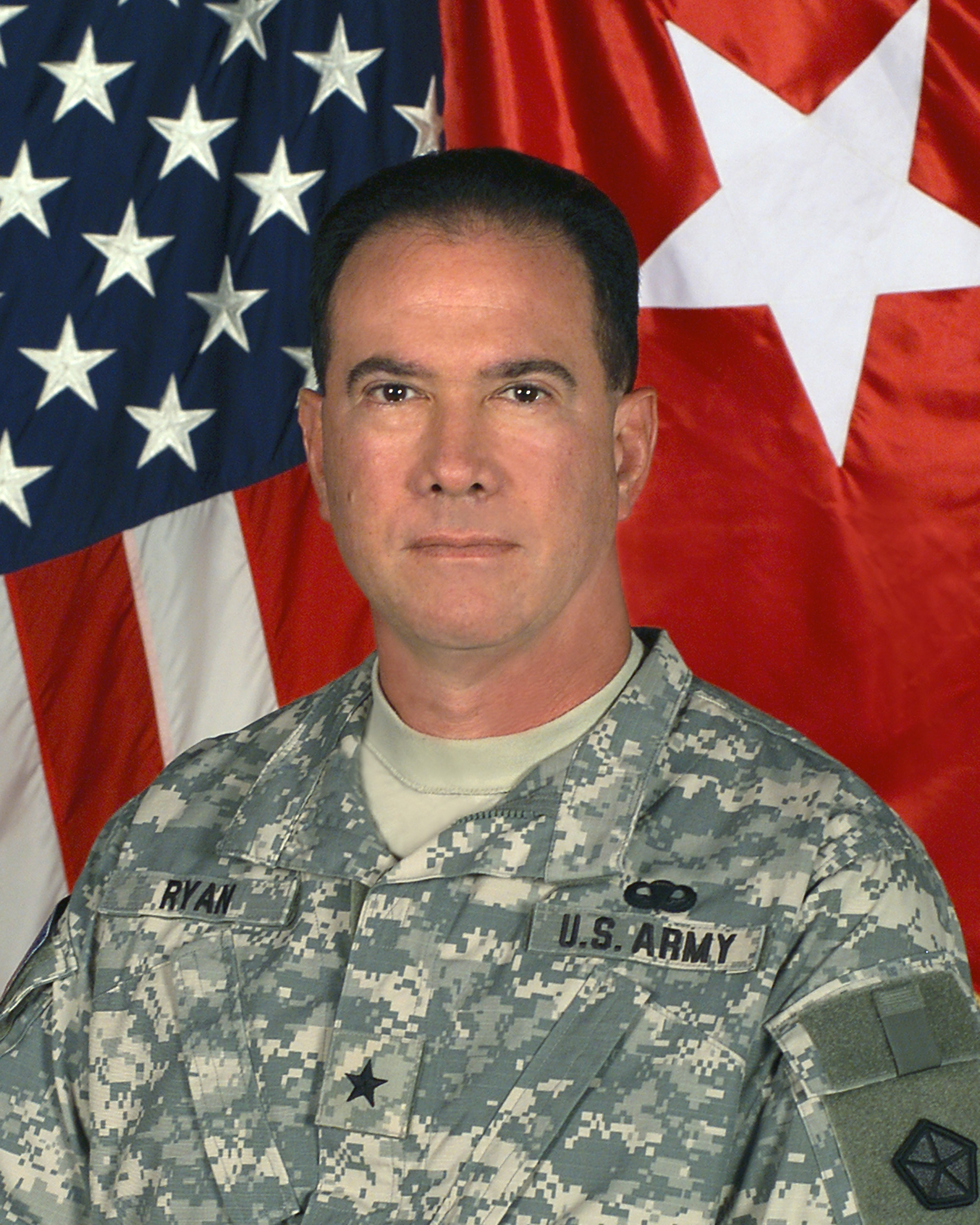
Brigadier General Michael A. Ryan

Brigadier General Michael A. Ryan was a General Officer in the United States Army.

== Military service ==
Ryan received a Regular Army commission in Armor in 1981 upon graduating with a Journalism degree from Arizona State University as a Distinguished Military Graduate. His military education includes the Armor Officer Basic and Advanced Courses, Command and General Staff College and the United States Army War College. He holds a master's degree in Strategic Studies. He has also attended a variety of NATO seminars and courses.

Ryan's first duty assignment was in the 3rd Infantry Division as a Tank Platoon Leader, Tank Company Executive Officer and Support Platoon Leader in the 1st Battalion, 64th Armor in Kitzingen, Germany. After serving as the S-3 Air, he commanded Alpha Company, then Headquarters & Headquarters Company of the 3rd Battalion, 67th Armor, 2nd Armored Division at Fort Hood, Texas. He returned to Germany as a maneuver company team Observer Controller at the Combat Maneuver Training Center (CMTC) at the Hohenfels Training Area (at Hohenfels, Bavaria) and then served as a Tank Battalion S-3 in both the 1st Battalion, 68th Armor, 8th Infantry Division in Wildflecken and the 5th Battalion, 77th Armor, 1st Armored Division in Mannheim.

Reassigned to the CMTC following Command and General Staff College, BG Ryan served as the Executive Officer for the 1st Battalion, 4th Infantry Opposing Forces Battalion (OPFOR) and as the Executive Officer and Operations Officer for the CMTC Operations Group. Returning to Fort Hood, he commanded the 1st Battalion, 8th U.S. Cavalry (Mustangs), 1st Cavalry Division, deploying with his battalion to Camp McGovern, Brcko, Bosnia-Herzegovina on SFOR 4 and then served as the G3 (Operations Officer) for the 1st Cavalry Division. Following graduation from the U.S. Army War College in Carlisle, Pennsylvania, BG Ryan commanded the 1st (Iron Horse) Brigade, 1st Cavalry Division and following that command served as the Director of the Joint Advanced Warfighting Program (now Division)/Analytical Projects Office in Alexandria, VA.

He was assigned in July 2005 as the Deputy Division Commander for Maneuver of the 1st Armored Division headquartered in Wiesbaden, Germany. In late 2006 he served as the Deputy Chief of Staff for Operations of NATO's Allied Rapid Reaction Corps (ARRC) the first rapidly deployable NATO Corps HQ located near Düsseldorf, Germany. He was deployed with the ARRC to Afghanistan for ISAF (International Security Assistance Force) IX in 2006-7 in that position. He served in 2009 as the Director of Strategic Communications and Strategic Effects for ISAF and USFOR-A (US Forces-Afghanistan). Since August 2009, BG Ryan has been serving in Heidelberg, Germany as the V Corps Deputy Commanding General and Acting Commanding General. He is recently retired following over 30 years of distinguished service.

BG Ryan has deployed to Bosnia for Operation Joint Forge and to Iraq during Operation Iraqi Freedom I & II and to Afghanistan during Operation Enduring Freedom (OEF) and ISAF IX & XI.

== Awards and decorations ==
General Ryan's awards include:

- Distinguished Service Medal
- Bronze Star Medal
- Defense Superior Service Medal 2nd Award
- Legion of Merit 2nd award
- Meritorious Service Medal, 5th award
- Army Commendation Medal, 3rd award
- Iraq & Afghanistan Campaign Medals
- Global War on Terrorism Expeditionary Medal and Service Medal
- NATO Medal
- Parachutist Badge
- Joint Chiefs of Staff Identification Badge
