= 1969 UMass Redmen baseball team =

American college baseball season

1969 UMass Redmen baseball

Yankee champion District I champion

College World Series, T-5th
- Conference: Yankee Conference
- CB: No. 5
- Record: 22–10 (9–1 Yankee)
- Head coach: Dick Bergquist (3rd season)
- MVP: Joe DiSarcina
- Home stadium: Varsity Field

1969 Yankee Conference baseball standings
	Conf.				Overall
Team	W		L	PCT	W		L	PCT
No. 5 UMass ‍†‍‍^{y}	9	–	1	.900	22	–	10	.688
Connecticut ‍‍‍	6	–	4	.600	10	–	16	.385
Maine ‍‍‍	6	–	4	.600	12	–	12	.500
Vermont ‍‍‍	5	–	5	.500	13	–	9	.591
Rhode Island ‍‍‍	2	–	8	.200	4	–	13	.235
New Hampshire ‍‍‍	2	–	8	.200	6	–	15	.286
† – Conference champion y – Invited to the NCAA tournament As of June 30, 1969; Rankings from Collegiate Baseball

The 1969 UMass Redmen baseball team represented the University of Massachusetts Amherst in the 1969 NCAA University Division baseball season. The Redmen played their home games at Varsity Field. The team was coached by Dick Bergquist in his 3rd year as head coach at UMass.

The Redmen won the District I to advance to the College World Series, where they were defeated by the Arizona State Sun Devils.

== Roster ==
1969 UMass Redmen baseball team
Players
Coaches

#	Pos.	Name	B/T	Height	Weight	Year	Home town
	RHP	Don Anderson	/R	—	—		Westfield, New Jersey
		George Anderson	/	—	—	Sr	Weymouth, Massachusetts
		Jack Bernardo	/	—	—	So	Ludlow, Massachusetts
		Tim Berringer	/	—	—	Jr	Framingham, Massachusetts
	C	Tony Chinappi (C)	/	—	—	Sr	Milford, Massachusetts
	LHP	Lou Colabello	/L	—	—	So	Milford, Massachusetts
	P	Bob Dempsey	/	—	—		Fall River, Massachusetts
	INF	Joe DiSarcina (C)	/	—	—	Sr	Burlington, Massachusetts
	INF	Ray Ellerbrook	/	—	—	Jr	Hawthorne, New Jersey
	P	Norm Elliot	/	—	—		Waltham, Massachusetts
		Joe Gugliotta	/	—	—		Stratford, Connecticut
	OF	Bob Hansen	L/L	—	—		Boston, Massachusetts
	P	Ken Hughes	/	—	—		Rockaway, New Jersey
	RHP	John Kitchen	R/R	6 ft 3 in (1.91 m)	195 lb (88 kg)		Chicopee, Massachusetts
		Warren Mason	/	—	—		Lynnfield, Massachusetts
	INF	Chuck Newell	S/R	6 ft 2 in (1.88 m)	185 lb (84 kg)		East Longmeadow, Massachusetts
	OF	Dick Pepin	/	—	—		Beverly, Massachusetts
	P	Bill Powell	/	—	—
		Steve Ring	/	—	—		Malden, Massachusetts
	OF	Mitch Salnick	/	—	—		Westwood, New Jersey
	INF	Tom Semino	/	—	—		Braintree, Massachusetts
		Steve Sanford	/	—	—		Harwich, Massachusetts
		Paul Sulzicki	/	—	—		Stratford, Connecticut
		Bob Willman	/	—	—		Teaneck, New Jersey

Head coach

Dick Bergquist

Assistant coach(es)

Legend

- (C) Team captain
- (S) Suspended
- (I) Ineligible
- Injured
- Current redshirt

== Schedule ==
1969 UMass Redmen baseball game log
Regular season
March (2–5)

#	Date	Opponent	Site/stadium	Score	Overall record	Yankee record
1	March 23	at Belmont Abbey	Unknown • Belmont, North Carolina	0–6	0–1	–
2	March 24	at South Carolina	Unknown • Columbia, South Carolina	2–10	0–2	–
3	March 25	at Clemson	Riggs Field • Clemson, South Carolina	10–16	0–3	–
4	March 26	at Clemson	Riggs Field • Clemson, South Carolina	9–13	0–4	–
5	March 27	at Wake Forest	Ernie Shore Field • Winston-Salem, North Carolina	7–6	1–4	–
6	March 28	at Wake Forest	Ernie Shore Field • Winston-Salem, North Carolina	16–10	2–4	–
7	March 29	at Virginia Tech	Tech Park • Blacksburg, Virginia	4–12	2–5	–

April (10–0)

#	Date	Opponent	Site/stadium	Score	Overall record	Yankee record
8	April 10	at Connecticut	J. O. Christian Field • Storrs, Connecticut	4–1	3–5	1–0
9	April 12	at Boston College	John Shea Field • Boston, Massachusetts	8–3	4–5	1–0
10	April 14	Tufts	Varsity Field • Amherst, Massachusetts	29–0	5–5	1–0
11	April 20	American International	Unknown • Springfield, Massachusetts	16–4	6–5	1–0
12	April 21	Vermont	UnknoVarsity Fieldwn • Amherst, Massachusetts	10–3	7–5	2–0
13	April 21	Vermont	Varsity Field • Amherst, Massachusetts	7–6	8–5	3–0
14	April 24	Rhode Island	Varsity Field • Amherst, Massachusetts	11–5	9–5	4–0
15	April 26	New Hampshire	Varsity Field • Amherst, Massachusetts	7–2	10–5	5–0
16	April 29	Connecticut	Varsity Field • Amherst, Massachusetts	4–0	11–5	6–0
17	April 30	at Dartmouth	Red Rolfe Field • Hanover, New Hampshire	12–6	12–5	6–0

May (6–3)

#	Date	Opponent	Site/stadium	Score	Overall record	Yankee record
18	May 2	Maine	Varsity Field • Amherst, Massachusetts	8–12	12–6	6–1
19	May 3	Maine	Varsity Field • Amherst, Massachusetts	12–2	13–6	7–1
20	May 5	at Williams	Unknown • Williamstown, Massachusetts	3–0	14–6	7–1
21	May 7	at Rhode Island	Bill Beck Field • Kingston, Rhode Island	4–1	15–6	8–1
22	May 10	at New Hampshire	Brackett Field • Durham, New Hampshire	13–8	16–6	9–1
23	May 12	at Amherst	Unknown • Amherst, Massachusetts	8–2	17–6	9–1
24	May 15	Springfield	Varsity Field • Amherst, Massachusetts	0–9	17–7	9–1
25	May 16	Army	Varsity Field • Amherst, Massachusetts	3–4	17–8	9–1
26	May 17	Boston University	Varsity Field • Amherst, Massachusetts	6–4	18–8	9–1

Postseason
NCAA District I Playoff (3–0)

#	Date	Opponent	Site/stadium	Score	Overall record	Yankee record
27	May 30	Dartmouth	Varsity Field • Amherst, Massachusetts	5–2	19–8	9–1
28	May 31	Boston University	Varsity Field • Amherst, Massachusetts	8–6	20–8	9–1
29	June 1	Boston University	Varsity Field • Amherst, Massachusetts	6–1	21–8	9–1

College World Series (1–2)

#	Date	Opponent	Site/stadium	Score	Overall record	Yankee record
30	June 14	vs Southern Illinois	Johnny Rosenblatt Stadium • Omaha, Nebraska	2–0	22–8	9–1
31	June 16	vs NYU	Johnny Rosenblatt Stadium • Omaha, Nebraska	2–9	22–9	9–1
32	June 17	vs Arizona State	Johnny Rosenblatt Stadium • Omaha, Nebraska	2–4	22–10	9–1

== Awards and honors ==
Don Anderson

- First Team All-Yankee Conference
- First Team All-New England
- First Team All-Northeast Region

Tony Chinappi

- First Team All-Yankee Conference
- First Team All-New England
- First Team All-Northeast Region

Joe DiSarcina

- First Team All-Yankee Conference
- First Team All-New England
- First Team All-Northeast Region
- Third Team All-American Baseball Coaches Association

Ray Ellerbrook

- First Team All-Yankee Conference

Bob Hansen

- First Team All-Yankee Conference
- First Team All-New England
- First Team All-Northeast Region
- Second Team All-American Baseball Coaches Association

John Kitchen

- First Team All-Yankee Conference

Dick Pepin

- First Team All-Yankee Conference

Tom Semino

- First Team All-Yankee Conference
- First Team All-New England
- First Team All-Northeast Region
