= John G. Smith (coach) =

American sportsman (1924–1998)

Biographical details
- Born: November 24, 1924; Tipton, Oklahoma, U.S.
- Died: June 10, 1998 (aged 73); Spokane, Washington, U.S.
- Education: University of Central Oklahoma

Coaching career (HC unless noted)

Baseball
- 1959–1962: Central State (OK)
- 1967–1980: Idaho

Basketball
- 1958–1962: Central State (OK)

Football
- 1958–1961: Central State (OK) (asst.)
- 1965–1966: Idaho (asst. - DL)

Accomplishments and honors

Championships
- Big Sky: 1967, 1969

Awards
- Big Sky: coach of the year: baseball: 1967
- Military career
- Burial place: Moscow, Idaho
- Allegiance: United States
- Branch: United States Navy
- Service years: 1943–1945
- Unit: Pacific - PT boats
- Conflicts: World War II

John G. Smith (November 24, 1924 – June 10, 1998) was an American college baseball coach, the head coach at the University of Idaho for fourteen seasons. He also coached football and basketball.

== Early years ==
Born in Tipton, Oklahoma, to Will and Margie Smith, he attended its public schools. Smith enlisted in the U.S. Navy during World War II as a teenager and served on PT boats in the Pacific. He returned to Oklahoma to attend college at Central State University in Edmond and lettered in four sports.

== Coaching ==
Smith was a coach at Capitol Hill High School in Oklahoma City and then returned to his alma mater in Edmond in 1958 as head coach in basketball and baseball at the NAIA level, and an assistant in football.

=== Idaho ===
Smith moved his family to southwestern Idaho sight unseen in 1962 and coached at Caldwell High School before moving north to the Palouse at Moscow. After a short stint in private business, he was hired at the University of Idaho in early 1965 as an assistant coach in football, leading the defensive line under newly-promoted head coach Steve Musseau.

In September 1966, Wayne Anderson was promoted to head basketball coach, and stepped down after nine seasons as head baseball coach. In late November, Smith was named head baseball coach, which included assistant coaching in basketball, and he stepped away from the football program after two seasons. The Vandals had won the first Big Sky baseball title in 1964 and again in 1966, when they were invited to the NCAA postseason for the first time and advanced to the regional finals.

In Smith's first season in 1967, Idaho repeated as champions, and he was the conference coach of the year. The 1969 team won another Big Sky title and advanced to the regional finals, falling to eventual national champion Arizona State.

The Big Sky discontinued baseball (and four other sports) after 1974, and Idaho moved to the new Northern Pacific Conference (NorPac) for the 1975 season. Citing budget constraints in 1980, Idaho (and Boise State) dropped the sport, and Smith continued in the UI athletic department for the next seven years as equipment manager.

When John L. Smith (b.1948) arrived on campus as an assistant football coach in 1982, both began using their middle initial to avoid confusion.

== Head coaching record ==
=== College baseball ===
Record table
Season	Team	Overall	Conference	Standing	Postseason
Central State Bronchos (Oklahoma Collegiate Athletic Conference) (1959–1961)
1959	Central State	12–10			
1960	Central State	13–9			
1961	Central State	6–9			
Central State:		31–27 (.534)			
Idaho Vandals (Big Sky Conference) (1967–1974)
1967	Idaho	21–9–1	7–1	1st	NCAA Regionals
1968	Idaho	17–16			
1969	Idaho	30–10	10–2	1st	NCAA Regionals
1970	Idaho	21–20–2	4–8		
1971	Idaho	28–15–1	7–3		
1972	Idaho	21–17	6–4		
1973	Idaho	15–14–1			
1974	Idaho	18–19			
Idaho Vandals (Northern Pacific Conference) (1975–1980)
1975	Idaho	12–21–3			
1976	Idaho	11–29			
1977	Idaho	13–29	8–16		
1978	Idaho	11–25	5–15		
1979	Idaho	24–28–1	11–9		
1980	Idaho	17–31–1	11–15	6th	
Idaho:		261–281–7 (.482)			
Total:		292–308–7 (.487)			
National champion Postseason invitational champion Conference regular season champion Conference regular season and conference tournament champion Division regular season champion Division regular season and conference tournament champion Conference tournament champion

=== College basketball ===
Record table
Season	Team	Overall	Conference	Standing	Postseason
Central State Bronchos (Oklahoma Collegiate Athletic Conference) (1958–1962)
1958–59	Central State	21–10		1st	NAIA Second Round
1959–60	Central State	16–7			
1960–61	Central State	21–7			NAIA Elite Eight
1961–62	Central State	12–14			
Central State:		70–38 (.648)			
Total:		70–38 (.648)			
National champion Postseason invitational champion Conference regular season champion Conference regular season and conference tournament champion Division regular season champion Division regular season and conference tournament champion Conference tournament champion

== Personal life ==
Smith married Rosalie Tucker in 1944 and they had three sons. The eldest, Gregg (b.1946), was a longtime assistant football coach under Dennis Erickson, from Idaho in 1982 through 2011 at Arizona State.

Smith was known for his deadpan dry wit and was often the master of ceremonies for athletic department functions. He was an avid fisherman and enjoyed golf. Smith and his wife continued to reside in Moscow following his retirement from the university in 1987.

== Death ==
Retired for over a decade, Smith contracted pneumonia and died from complications at age 73 at Sacred Heart Hospital in Spokane; he was buried at the city cemetery in Moscow, Idaho.
