= 1969 Arizona State Sun Devils baseball team =

American college baseball season

1969 Arizona State Sun Devils baseball

National champions WAC champions
- Conference: Western Athletic Conference
- CB: No. 1
- Record: 56–11 (15–3 WAC)
- Head coach: Bobby Winkles (11th year)
- Assistant coach: Jack Smitheran

1969 Western Athletic Conference baseball standings
	Conf.				Overall
Team	W		L	PCT	W		L	PCT
Northern
No. 18 BYU ‍‍‍	13	–	5	.722	30	–	15	.667
Wyoming ‍‍‍	11	–	7	.611	14	–	22	.389
Utah ‍‍‍	7	–	11	.389	20	–	22	.476
Colorado State ‍‍‍	5	–	13	.278	13	–	20	.394
Southern
No. 1 Arizona State ‍‍‍^{y}	15	–	3	.833	56	–	11	.836
No. 19 Arizona ‍‍‍	10	–	8	.556	37	–	10	.787
New Mexico ‍‍‍	7	–	11	.389	31	–	17	.646
UTEP ‍‍‍	4	–	14	.222	17	–	27	.386
† – Conference champion y – Invited to the NCAA tournament As of June 30, 1969; Rankings from Collegiate Baseball

The 1969 Arizona State Sun Devils baseball team represented Arizona State University in the 1969 NCAA University Division baseball season. The team was coached by Bobby Winkles in his 11th season at Arizona State.

The Sun Devils won the College World Series, defeating the Tulsa Golden Hurricane in the championship game.

== Roster ==
1969 Arizona State Sun Devils roster
Pitchers: 11 Larry Gura; 14 Lerrin LaGrow; 20 Jim Crawford; 21 Bill Leinheiser; 23 Craig Swan; 25 Joe Miller; 26 Ken Hansen	Infielders: 2 Lenny Randle; 5 Bill Massarand; 6 Jeff Osborn; 8 Roger Detter; 9 Gene Kobar; 10 Rick Valley; 15 Tom Welton; 17 Jack Collinge; 18 Terry Brenner	Outfielders: 3 John Dolinsek; 4 Paul Powell; 7 Ralph Dick; 24 Willie Harris; Catchers: 22 Billy Cotton; 27 Irv McDonald

== Schedule ==
1969 Arizona State Sun Devils baseball game log
Regular season
February/March

Date	Opponent	Score	Overall record	WAC record
February 27	Cal Poly Pomona	5–0	1–0	–
February 28	Chapman	8–13	1–1	–
March 1	Chapman	9–1	2–1	–
March 1	Chapman	11–8	3–1	–
March 7	Cal State LA	3–1	4–1	–
March 8	Cal State LA	9–3	5–1	–
March 8	Cal State LA	6–0	6–1	–
March 11	Albuquerque	10–0	7–1	–
March 11	Albuquerque	8–5	8–1	–
March 12	San Diego State	3–2	9–1	–
March 13	San Diego State	5–1	10–1	–
March 14	San Fernando State	0–5	10–2	–
March 14	San Fernando State	4–5	10–3	–
March 15	San Fernando State	4–9	10–4	–
March 17	Ohio State	5–10	10–5	–
March 18	Ohio State	2–0	11–5	–
March 19	Ohio State	5–0	12–5	–
March 21	Michigan	18–14	13–5	–
March 24	Michigan	19–3	14–5	–
March 24	Michigan	5–3	15–5	–
March 25	Michigan	6–5	16–5	–
March 25	Michigan	3–4	16–6	–
March 26	Cal Poly	5–0	17–6	–
March 26	Southern Illinois	4–3	18–6	–
March 27	Oklahoma	5–4	19–6	–
March 28	Wyoming	11–7	20–6	–
March 29	Wyoming	6–4	21–6	–
March 29	Wyoming	11–4	22–6	–
March 31	Wyoming	18–9	23–6	–

April

Date	Opponent	Score	Overall record	WAC record
April 4	Wisconsin	18–0	24–6	–
April 5	Wisconsin	11–1	25–6	–
April 5	Wisconsin	3–1	26–6	–
April 7	Wisconsin	12–1	27–6	–
April 8	Wisconsin	7–2	28–6	–
April 9	Wisconsin	1–0	29–6	–
April 11	at Arizona	4–3	30–6	1–0
April 12	at Arizona	11–7	31–6	2–0
April 12	at Arizona	4–5	31–7	2–1
April 15	Grand Canyon	7–2	32–7	–
April 18	UTEP	5–0	33–7	3–1
April 19	UTEP	11–6	34–7	4–1
April 19	UTEP	11–0	35–7	5–1
April 24	at Albuquerque	10–12	35–8	–
April 25	at New Mexico	2–1	36–8	6–1
April 26	at New Mexico	9–5	37–8	7–1
April 26	at New Mexico	13–2	38–8	8–1
April 29	Northern Arizona	5–1	39–8	–

May

Date	Opponent	Score	Overall record	WAC record
May 2	Arizona	0–2	39–9	8–2
May 3	Arizona	11–0	40–9	9–2
May 3	Arizona	5–0	41–9	10–2
May 6	Grand Canyon	4–0	42–9	–
May 9	at UTEP	2–1	43–9	11–2
May 10	at UTEP	10–2	44–9	12–2
May 10	at UTEP	13–1	45–9	13–2
May 16	New Mexico	3–1	46–9	14–2
May 17	New Mexico	3–5	46–10	14–3
May 17	New Mexico	14–0	47–10	15–3

Post-season
WAC Championship

Date	Opponent	Score	Overall record
May 22	vs. BYU	1–0	48–10
May 23	vs. BYU	10–0	49–10

NCAA tournament: District 7 playoffs

Date	Opponent	Score	Overall record
May 30	vs. Idaho	7–1	50–10
May 31	vs. Idaho	3–2	51–10

NCAA tournament: College World Series

Date	Opponent	Site/stadium	Score	Overall record
June 13	vs. Texas	Rosenblatt Stadium	0–4	51–11
June 14	vs. UCLA	Rosenblatt Stadium	2–1	52–11
June 17	vs. Massachusetts	Rosenblatt Stadium	4–2	53–11
June 18	vs. Tulsa	Rosenblatt Stadium	11–3	54–11
June 19	vs. NYU	Rosenblatt Stadium	4–1	55–11
June 20	vs. Tulsa	Rosenblatt Stadium	10–1	56–11

== Awards and honors ==
Billy Cotton

- College World Series All-Tournament Team
- First Team All-American
- First Team All-WAC

Roger Detter

- College World Series All-Tournament Team

Ralph Dick

- First Team All-WAC

John Dolincek

- College World Series Most Outstanding Player

Larry Gura

- College World Series All-Tournament Team
- First Team All-American
- First Team All-WAC

Jeff Osborn

- First Team All-WAC

Paul Powell

- The Sporting News Player of the Year
- College World Series All-Tournament Team
- First Team All-American
- First Team All-WAC

== Sun Devils in the 1969 MLB draft ==
The following members of the Arizona State Sun Devils baseball program were drafted in the 1969 Major League Baseball draft.

Player	Position	Round	Overall	MLB team
Paul Powell	OF	1st	7th	Minnesota Twins
Larry Gura	LHP	2nd	40th	Chicago Cubs
Lerrin LaGrow	RHP	6th	139th	Detroit Tigers
John Dolinsek	OF	8th	170th	Houston Astros
