= 1969 NCAA University Division baseball rankings =

1969 college basketball ranking

1969 NCAA University Division baseball season

Tournament

College World Series
- Champions: Arizona State
- Runners-up: Tulsa
- MOP: John Dolinsek (Arizona State)

Seasons
- ← 1968 1970 →

The following poll makes up the 1969 NCAA University Division baseball rankings. Collegiate Baseball Newspaper published its first human poll of the top 20 teams in college baseball in 1957, and expanded to rank the top 30 teams in 1961.

== Collegiate Baseball ==
Currently, only the final poll from the 1969 season is available.

Rank	Team
1	Arizona State
2	Tulsa
3	NYU
4	Texas
5	UMass
6	Ole Miss
7	Southern Illinois
8	UCLA
9	Santa Clara
10	Florida State
11	Minnesota
12	Virginia Tech
13	Oklahoma State
14	Miami
15	North Carolina
16	Stanford
17	USC
18	BYU
19	Arizona
20	Tulane
21	Ball State
22	Ohio
23	Western Michigan
24	Long Beach State
25	Boston University
26	Colgate
27	Seton Hall
28	St. John's
29	California
30	Clemson
