= 1969 UCLA Bruins baseball team =

American college baseball season

1969 UCLA Bruins baseball

Pacific-8 Champions District VIII champions

College World Series, T-7th
- Conference: Pacific-8
- CB: No. 8
- Record: 42–12–1 (17–4 Pac-8)
- Head coach: Art Reichle (24th season)
- Home stadium: Sawtelle Field

1969 Pacific-8 Conference baseball standings
	Conf.						Overall
Team	W		L		T	PCT	W		L		T	PCT
No. 8 UCLA ‍†‍‍^{y}	17	–	4	–	0	.810	42	–	12	–	1	.773
No. 16 Stanford ‍‍‍	16	–	5	–	0	.762	34	–	12	–	0	.739
No. 17 Southern California ‍‍‍	13	–	5	–	0	.722	39	–	12	–	1	.760
No. 29 California ‍‍‍	12	–	9	–	0	.571	31	–	19	–	0	.620
Oregon State ‍‍‍	9	–	12	–	0	.429	17	–	20	–	1	.461
Oregon ‍‍‍	8	–	13	–	0	.381	22	–	19	–	0	.537
Washington State ‍‍‍	8	–	13	–	0	.381	27	–	15	–	0	.643
Washington ‍‍‍	1	–	20	–	0	.048	7	–	29	–	0	.194
† – Conference champion y – Invited to the NCAA tournament As of June 30, 1969; Rankings from Collegiate Baseball

The 1969 UCLA Bruins baseball team represented the University of California, Los Angeles in the 1969 NCAA University Division baseball season. The Bruins played their home games at Sawtelle Field. The team was coached by Art Reichle in his 24th year at UCLA.

The Bruins won the District VIII Regional to advance to the College World Series, where they were defeated by the Arizona State Sun Devils.

== Roster ==
1969 UCLA Bruins baseball team
Players
Coaches

#	Pos.	Name	B/T	Height	Weight	Year	Home town
	OF	Barry Berson	/	—	—
	RHP	Bill Bonham	R/R	6 ft 3 in (1.91 m)	190 lb (86 kg)		Sun Valley, California
	OF	Barry Botterman	R/R	6 ft 0 in (1.83 m)	185 lb (84 kg)		Canoga Park, California
	OF	Mike Carty	/	—	—
	INF	Chris Chambliss	L/R	6 ft 1 in (1.85 m)	195 lb (88 kg)		Oceanside, California
	P	Roy Coston	/	—	—
	INF	Steven Edney	R/R	5 ft 8 in (1.73 m)	165 lb (75 kg)		Wash.DC
	RHP	Guy Hansen	R/R	6 ft 0 in (1.83 m)	185 lb (84 kg)
		Wayne Holland	/	—	—
	RHP	Al Hoops	R/R	6 ft 1 in (1.85 m)	185 lb (84 kg)		Long Beach, California
	INF	Ed Hume	/	—	—
	C	Bill LeBlanc	/	—	—
	P	Sandy Marks	/	—	—
	P	Tom Miles	/	—	—
	INF	Jake Molina	/	—	—
	C	Bob Petretta	/	—	—
	RHP	Rick Pope	R/R	6 ft 4 in (1.93 m)	220 lb (100 kg)		Pico Rivera, California
	OF	Steve Price	/	—	—
	OF	Mike Reinbach	L/R	6 ft 2 in (1.88 m)	195 lb (88 kg)		El Cajon, California
	C	Jim Rodriguez	/	—	—
	INF	Steve Runk	/	—	—
	P	Mike Sandford	/	—	—
	INF	Gary Saserino	R/R	6 ft 0 in (1.83 m)	180 lb (82 kg)		Los Angeles, California
	INF	Don Sealy	/	—	—
	P	Rod Tysdal	/	—	—
	RHP	Jim York	R/R	6 ft 3 in (1.91 m)	200 lb (91 kg)		Maywood, California

Head coach

Art Reichle

Assistant coach(es)

Legend

- (C) Team captain
- (S) Suspended
- (I) Ineligible
- Injured
- Current redshirt

== Schedule ==
1969 UCLA Bruins baseball game log
Regular season
February (4–1)

#	Date	Opponent	Site/stadium	Score	Overall record	Pac-8 record
1	February 7	Long Beach City	Sawtelle Field • Los Angeles, California	6–0	1–0	0–0
2	February 11	Cal Lutheran	Sawtelle Field • Los Angeles, California	10–0	2–0	0–0
3	February 13	College of the Sequoias	Sawtelle Field • Los Angeles, California	0–1	2–1	0–0
4	February 14	at Fresno State	Varsity Park • Fresno, California	4–0	3–1	0–0
5	February 26	Pepperdine	Sawtelle Field • Los Angeles, California	5–4	4–1	0–0

March (13–2–1)

#	Date	Opponent	Site/stadium	Score	Overall record	Pac-8 record
6	March 1	Cal Poly	Sawtelle Field • Los Angeles, California	11–1	5–1	0–0
7	March 1	Cal Poly	Sawtelle Field • Los Angeles, California	5–2	6–1	0–0
8	March 4	Loyola Marymount	Sawtelle Field • Los Angeles, California	14–7	7–1	0–0
9	March 5	at Occidental	Anderson Field • Los Angeles, California	3–1	8–1	0–0
10	March 7	at San Fernando Valley State	Matador Field • Northridge, California	8–3	9–1	0–0
11	March 8	at San Diego State	Unknown • San Diego, California	10–6	10–1	0–0
12	March 8	at San Diego State	Unknown • San Diego, California	9–0	11–1	0–0
13	March 11	Cal State Fullerton	Sawtelle Field • Los Angeles, California	6–5	12–1	0–0
14	March 12	at Claremont	Unknown • Claremont, California	13–3	13–1	0–0
15	March 14	at Long Beach State	Blair Field • Long Beach, California	2–1	14–1	0–0
16	March 25	Utah	Sawtelle Field • Los Angeles, California	5–4	15–1	0–0
17	March 25	Utah	Sawtelle Field • Los Angeles, California	3–0	16–1	0–0
18	March 28	at Chapman	Unknown • Orange, California	2–2	16–1–1	0–0
19	March 29	at Cal State Los Angeles	Reeder Field • Los Angeles, California	8–1	17–1–1	0–0
20	March 29	at Cal State Los Angeles	Reeder Field • Los Angeles, California	4–5	17–2–1	0–0
21	March 31	vs Illinois	Unknown • Riverside, California	8–12	17–3–1	0–0

April (14–7)

#	Date	Opponent	Site/stadium	Score	Overall record	Pac-8 record
22	April 1	vs Indiana	Unknown • Riverside, California	6–4	18–3–1	0–0
23	April 1	vs Delaware	Unknown • Riverside, California	6–0	19–3–1	0–0
24	April 2	at UC Riverside	Unknown • Riverside, California	10–7	20–3–1	0–0
25	April 4	vs Ole Miss	Unknown • Riverside, California	5–1	21–3–1	0–0
26	April 5	vs USC	Unknown • Riverside, California	3–11	21–4–1	0–0
27	April 5	vs BYU	Unknown • Riverside, California	7–11	21–5–1	0–0
28	April 8	San Fernando Valley State	Sawtelle Field • Los Angeles, California	3–4	21–6–1	0–0
29	April 9	San Diego State	Sawtelle Field • Los Angeles, California	9–8	22–6–1	0–0
30	April 11	Stanford	Sawtelle Field • Los Angeles, California	2–3	22–7–1	0–1
31	April 12	California	Sawtelle Field • Los Angeles, California	1–3	22–8–1	0–2
32	April 12	California	Sawtelle Field • Los Angeles, California	5–3	23–8–1	1–2
33	April 15	Cal Poly Pomona	Sawtelle Field • Los* Angeles, California	11–8	24–8–1	1–2
34	April 18	Washington State	Sawtelle Field • Los Angeles, California	1–0	25–8–1	2–2
35	April 19	Washington	Sawtelle Field • Los Angeles, California	6–2	26–8–1	3–2
36	April 19	Washington	Sawtelle Field • Los Angeles, California	7–0	27–8–1	4–2
37	April 21	Oregon	Sawtelle Field • Los Angeles, California	1–2	27–9–1	4–3
38	April 21	Oregon	Sawtelle Field • Los Angeles, California	7–0	28–9–1	5–3
39	April 22	Oregon State	Sawtelle Field • Los Angeles, California	2–1	29–9–1	6–3
40	April 25	at California	Edwards Field • Berkeley, California	2–3	29–10–1	6–4
41	April 26	at Stanford	Sunken Diamond • Stanford, California	5–0	30–10–1	7–4
42	April 26	at Stanford	Sunken Diamond • Stanford, California	4–3	31–10–1	8–4

May (8–1)

#	Date	Opponent	Site/stadium	Score	Overall record	Pac-8 record
43	May 3	Southern California	Sawtelle Field • Los Angeles, California	6–5	32–10–1	9–4
44	May 9	at Oregon	Howe Field • Eugene, Oregon	4–1	33–10–1	10–4
45	May 10	at Oregon State	Coleman Field • Beaverton, Oregon	5–1	34–10–1	11–4
46	May 10	at Oregon State	Coleman Field • Beaverton, Oregon	3–1	35–10–1	12–4
47	May 12	at Washington State	Bailey Field • Pullman, Washington	4–1	36–10–1	13–4
48	May 12	at Washington State	Bailey Field • Pullman, Washington	9–7	37–10–1	14–4
49	May 13	at Washington	Old Graves Field • Seattle, Washington	5–2	38–10–1	15–4
50	May 16	USC	Sawtelle Field • Los Angeles, California	9–4	39–10–1	16–4
51	May 17	at USC	Bovard Field • Los Angeles, California	14–5	40–10–1	17–4

Postseason
District VIII Playoff (2–0)

#	Date	Opponent	Site/stadium	Score	Overall record	Pac-8 record
52	May 23	Santa Clara	Sawtelle Field • Los Angeles, California	7–5	41–10–1	17–4
53	May 24	Santa Clara	Sawtelle Field • Los Angeles, California	2–1	42–10–1	17–4

College World Series (0–2)

#	Date	Opponent	Site/stadium	Score	Overall record	Pac-8 record
54	June 13	vs Tulsa	Omaha Municipal Stadium • Omaha, Nebraska	5–6	42–11–1	17–4
55	June 14	vs Arizona State	Omaha Municipal Stadium • Omaha, Nebraska	1–2	42–12–1	17–4

== Awards and honors ==
Chris Chambliss

- All-Pacific-8

Gary Sanserino

- All-Pac-8

Jim York

- All-Pac-8

Steven Edney

- All-Pac-8
