= Gene Shell =

American baseball, basketball, and football coach (1930–2020)

Biographical details
- Born: April 16, 1930
- Died: October 8, 2020 (aged 90)
- Education: Tulsa

Coaching career (HC unless noted)

Football
- 1965–1969: Tulsa (RG)

Basketball
- 1965–1975: Tulsa (assistant)

Baseball
- 1957–1959: Claremore (OK) HS
- 1961–1962: Webster (OK) HS
- 1963–1965: Edison (OK) HS
- 1966–1980: Tulsa
- 1985–1987: Southwestern Louisiana

Head coaching record
- Overall: 555–245
- Tournaments: NCAA: 14–14

Accomplishments and honors

Championships
- 4× MVC regular season (1971–1974); 6× MVC tournament (1969–1974)

Eugene Franklin Shell (April 16, 1930 – October 8, 2020) was an American baseball, basketball, and football coach. He played college baseball and college basketball at Northeastern State and Southwestern Oklahoma State. He then served as the head baseball coach of the Tulsa Golden Hurricane from 1966 to 1980, leading the Golden Hurricane to a second-place finish in the 1969 College World Series. He also was the head baseball coach of the Southwestern Louisiana Ragin' Cajuns (1985–1987).

== Early life ==
Shell attended Central High School and Webster High School in Tulsa, Oklahoma.

== Coaching career ==
Shell was head baseball coach at Edison Preparatory School, Webster High School and Claremore High School, where he won five state championships. In 1965, Shell was hired to be an assistant football coach for Tulsa. He was asked to be an assistant basketball coach as well before he was offered the position of head baseball coach.

Shell died on October 8, 2020.

== Head coaching record ==
Record table
Season	Team	Overall	Conference	Standing	Postseason
Tulsa Golden Hurricane (Missouri Valley Conference) (1966–1980)
1966	Tulsa	15–9	4–2	T-1st (West)	
1967	Tulsa	19–5	5–3	2nd (West)	
1968	Tulsa	24–4	7–0	1st (West)	
1969	Tulsa	39–5	7–1	1st (West)	College World Series
1970	Tulsa	28–12	7–1	1st (West)	District V tournament
1971	Tulsa	35–12		1st	College World Series
1972	Tulsa	44–6		1st	District V tournament
1973	Tulsa	43–12		1st	District V tournament
1974	Tulsa	36–13		1st	District V tournament
1975	Tulsa	28–14		2nd	District V tournament
1976	Tulsa	37–16		2nd	
1977	Tulsa	38–22		2nd	
1978	Tulsa	35–21		2nd	
1979	Tulsa	29–25		4th	
1980	Tulsa	28–25		5th	
Tulsa:		478–177	30–7		
Southwestern Louisiana Ragin' Cajuns (Independent) (1985–1987)
1985	Southwestern Louisiana	35–23			
1986	Southwestern Louisiana	33–26			
1987	Southwestern Louisiana	9–19			
Southwestern Louisiana:		77–68			
Total:		555–245			
National champion Postseason invitational champion Conference regular season champion Conference regular season and conference tournament champion Division regular season champion Division regular season and conference tournament champion Conference tournament champion
