= 1969 Texas Longhorns baseball team =

American college baseball season

1969 Texas Longhorns baseball

SWC champions

College World Series, 2–2
- Conference: Southwest Conference
- Record: 40–6 (14–2 SWC)
- Head coach: Cliff Gustafson (2nd year)
- Home stadium: Clark Field

1969 Southwest Conference baseball standings
	Conf.				Overall
Team	W		L	PCT	W		L	PCT
No. 4 Texas ‍†‍‍^{y}	14	–	2	.875	40	–	6	.870
TCU ‍‍‍	9	–	6	.600	22	–	8	.733
Texas Tech ‍‍‍	9	–	7	.563	13	–	13	.500
Rice ‍‍‍	7	–	6	.538	14	–	11	.560
Texas A&M ‍‍‍	7	–	8	.467	15	–	11	.577
Baylor ‍‍‍	6	–	11	.353	10	–	17	.370
SMU ‍‍‍	2	–	14	.125	5	–	21	.192
† – Conference champion y – Invited to the NCAA tournament As of June 30, 1969; Rankings from Collegiate Baseball

The 1969 Texas Longhorns baseball team represented the University of Texas at Austin in the 1969 NCAA University Division baseball season. The Longhorns played their home games at Clark Field. The team was coached by Cliff Gustafson in his 2nd season at Texas.

The Longhorns reached the College World Series, finishing fourth with wins over eventual champion Arizona State and fifth-place Ole Miss and losses to runner-up Tulsa and semifinalist NYU.

== Personnel ==
=== Roster ===
1969 Texas Longhorns roster
Pitchers: 5 - James Street; 10 - Natividad Salazar; 17 - Larry Hardy; 19 - Larry Elwood Horton; 20 - Burt Hooton; Catchers: 22 - Tommy Harmon	Infielders: 1 - Louis Lee Bagwell; 3 - David Chalk; 7 - John D. Langerhans; 9 - Patrick John Amos; Outfielders: 14 - Pat Brown; 12 - David Hall; 13 - Jack Miller; 23 - Randal C. Peschel	Utility: 2 - Michael Charles Markl; 6 - Dennis Wayne Kasper; 11 - Douglass Kirk Fell; 25 - Gene McNeal Salmon

== Schedule and results ==
Legend
Texas win
Texas loss
Tie

1969 Texas Longhorns baseball game log
Regular season

February/March
Date	Opponent	Site/stadium	Score	Overall record	SWC record
Feb 27	Sam Houston State*	Clark Field • Austin, TX	W 7–3	1–0	
Feb 28	Sam Houston State*	Clark Field • Austin, TX	W 12–0	2–0	
Mar 7	Oklahoma*	Clark Field • Austin, TX	W 4–1	3–0	
Mar 7	Oklahoma*	Clark Field • Austin, TX	W 3–0	4–0	
Mar 8	Oklahoma*	Clark Field • Austin, TX	L 9–11	4–1	
Mar 8	Oklahoma*	Clark Field • Austin, TX	W 12–6	5–1	
Mar 11	Texas Lutheran*	Clark Field • Austin, TX	W 10–2	6–1	
Mar 12	St. Mary's*	Clark Field • Austin, TX	W 13–7	7–1	
Mar 18	Minnesota*	Clark Field • Austin, TX	W 4–2	8–1	
Mar 18	Minnesota*	Clark Field • Austin, TX	L 6–7	8–2	
Mar 21	TCU	Clark Field • Austin, TX	W 7–3	9–2	1–0
Mar 21	TCU	Clark Field • Austin, TX	W 8–6	10–2	2–0
Mar 22	TCU	Clark Field • Austin, TX	W 7–5	11–2	3–0
Mar 28	at SMU	Dallas, TX	W 5–0	12–2	4–0
Mar 28	at SMU	Dallas, TX	W 5–0 (Note: James Street threw a 7-inning no-hitter.)	13–2	5–0
Mar 29	at SMU	Dallas, TX	W 8–1	14–2	6–0

April
Date	Opponent	Site/stadium	Score–	Overall record	SWC record
Apr 4	Rice	Clark Field • Austin, TX	W 5–3	15–2	7–0
Apr 4	Rice	Clark Field • Austin, TX	W 7–0	16–2	8–0
Apr 5	Rice	Clark Field • Austin, TX	W 8–2	17–2	9–0
Apr 7	Notre Dame*	Clark Field • Austin, TX	W 5–4	18–2	
Apr 11	at Baylor	Waco, TX	W 5–3	19–2	10–0
Apr 11	at Baylor	Waco, TX	W 5–2	20–2	11–0
Apr 15	Texas–Pan American*	Clark Field • Austin, TX	W 7–3	21–2	
Apr 17	Trinity*	Clark Field • Austin, TX	W 21–4	22–2	
Apr 25	Texas Tech	Clark Field • Austin, TX	L 1–2	22–3	11–1
Apr 25	Texas Tech	Clark Field • Austin, TX	W 12–1	23–3	12–1
Apr 26	Texas Tech	Clark Field • Austin, TX	W 6–2	24–3	13–1

May
Date	Opponent	Site/stadium	Score	Overall record	SWC record
May 6	at Texas A&M	Kyle Baseball Field • College Park, TX	W 2–1	25–3	14–1
May 6	at Texas A&M	Kyle Baseball Field • College Park, TX	L 2–5	25–4	14–2
May 9	Sam Houston State*	Clark Field • Austin, TX	W 1–0	26–4	
May 9	Sam Houston State*	Clark Field • Austin, TX	W 9–5	27–4	
May 10	Sam Houston State*	Clark Field • Austin, TX	W 7–2	28–4	
May 10	Sam Houston State*	Clark Field • Austin, TX	W 13–4	29–4	
May 12	Houston Baptist*	Clark Field • Austin, TX	W 11–0	30–4	
May 12	Houston Baptist*	Clark Field • Austin, TX	W 7–1	31–4	

Postseason

District 6 playoffs
Date	Opponent	Site/stadium	Score	Overall record	NCAAT record
May 17	Trinity	Clark Field • Austin, TX	W 10–0	32–4	1–0
May 17	Trinity	Clark Field • Austin, TX	W 5–0	33–4	2–0

Exhibitions
Date	Opponent	Site/stadium	Score	Overall record
June 5	at Seguin Sox	Seguin, TX	W 13–3	34–4
June 6	Dallas Truckers	Clark Field • Austin, TX	W 10–4	35–4
June 7	Dallas Truckers	Clark Field • Austin, TX	W 1–0^{10}	36–4
June 7	Dallas Truckers	Clark Field • Austin, TX	W 4–2	37–4
June 9	Seguin Sox	Clark Field • Austin, TX	W 4–1	38–4

College World Series
Date	Opponent	Site/stadium	Score	Overall record	CWS record
June 13	Arizona State	Johnny Rosenblatt Stadium • Omaha, NE	W 4–0	39–4	1–0
June 16	Tulsa	Johnny Rosenblatt Stadium • Omaha, NE	L 2–4	39–5	1–1
June 17	Ole Miss	Johnny Rosenblatt Stadium • Omaha, NE	W 14–1	40–5	2–1
June 18	NYU	Johnny Rosenblatt Stadium • Omaha, NE	L 2–3	40–6	2–2
