= Idaho Vandals baseball =

- Founded: 1900
- Defunct: 1980 (May)
- University: University of Idaho
- Head coach: John G. Smith (1967–1980)
- Conference: Northern Pacific (1975–1980); Big Sky (1964–1974); Pacific Coast / Northern Division (1923–1964)
- Location: Moscow, Idaho
- Home stadium: Guy Wicks Field (1967–1980); MacLean Field (192x–1966)
- Nickname: Vandals
- Colors: Silver and gold

NCAA tournament appearances
- 1966, 1967, 1969

Conference regular season champions
- Big Sky: 1964, 1966, 1967, 1969

The Idaho Vandals baseball team was the varsity intercollegiate baseball team of the University of Idaho, located in Moscow, Idaho.

Varsity baseball was played at Idaho through the 1980 season, primarily in the northern division of the Pacific Coast Conference. During the first six years of the Big Sky Conference, the Vandals won four titles under two head coaches, Wayne Anderson (1964, 1966) and John G. Smith (1967, 1969).

The 1966 and 1969 teams advanced to within one round of the College World Series, falling in the District 7 finals, today's "Super-Regionals" (Sweet 16).

== 1960s ==
=== 1964 ===
In the first year of the Big Sky Conference, Idaho went undefeated in conference play, and swept the title series with Weber State, played in Missoula, Montana. For a final season, the Vandals also played in the five-team Northern Division (of the defunct PCC), but were 5–11 in league games and finished last. During the final weekend of the season, Idaho upset Palouse neighbor Washington State in Pullman to eliminate the Cougars from title contention as Oregon took a two-game lead to clinch; WSU won the next day in Moscow.

Idaho was 8–2 in non-conference games for an overall record of 23–13 (.639). As a first-year league in 1964, the Big Sky champion was not invited to the NCAA playoffs. That summer, Oregon and Oregon State joined the AAWU (Pac-8) and Idaho's league play forward was in the Big Sky only.

=== 1966 ===
Led by senior pitcher Bill Stoneman with a 0.45 ERA, Idaho advanced to the NCAA postseason for the first time with a 31–7 regular season record. They traveled to Greeley and eliminated Colorado State College (now Northern Colorado) and Air Force, but then fell at Tucson to Arizona. The 34–9 (.791) overall record remains the best in school history, and the team was inducted into the Vandal Hall of Fame in 2012.

In addition to Stoneman, the Vandal pitching staff included future major leaguer Frank Reberger of Caldwell; both signed with the Chicago Cubs' organization after the season. As a major leaguer, Stoneman threw two no-hitters for the Montreal Expos, in 1969 and 1972.

It was Wayne Anderson's ninth and final season as head coach, and he was baseball coach of the year in the Big Sky. He was promoted to head coach of the basketball team in September and stepped away from baseball.

=== 1967 ===
After two seasons as defensive line coach for the football team, John G. Smith became the head coach for baseball in November 1966. With a new home field, the 1967 team repeated as Big Sky champions at 7–1, and a 21–7–1 (.741) record for the regular season, hampered by weather. Idaho lost in the first round of the NCAA playoffs at Colorado Springs to Air Force. Smith was the conference coach of the year.

=== 1969 ===
The 1969 team finished the regular season at 30–7 and 10–2 in the Big Sky. Idaho swept two from Air Force at home in Moscow to advance, then lost on the road in the District 7 finals at Mesa to host Arizona State, the eventual CWS champion.

== 1970s ==
The Big Sky expanded to eight teams in the summer of 1970, all with baseball, and split into two divisions for the 1971 season with a three-game playoff to determine the champion. The two Montana schools soon dropped the sport and Boise State was moved to the Northern Division with Idaho and Gonzaga for 1973. In May 1974, the Big Sky announced its discontinued sponsorship of baseball (and four other sports). Southern division champion Idaho State dropped their team weeks later, and three-time conference champion Weber State followed. The three Northern division schools (Idaho, Boise State, Gonzaga) joined the new Northern Pacific Conference (NorPac) for the 1975 season. (The NorPac included the larger baseball programs in the Northwest outside of the Pac-8, including Portland State, Portland, Seattle U., Puget Sound, and later, Eastern Washington.)

Ken Schrom of Grangeville was selected in the tenth round of the 1973 MLB draft as a high school senior, but opted for college. Also a quarterback for the football team, he pitched for the Vandals for three seasons until selected in the 1976 draft following his junior year. (An injury to his non-throwing (left) shoulder during the previous football season influenced his decision to leave school early.)

== 1980 ==
After six seasons in the NorPac, both Idaho and Boise State discontinued baseball as a varsity sport 46 years ago, following the 1980 season, citing budget constraints. (BSU's program returned four decades later, in 2020, before being cut in the same year during the COVID-19 pandemic.)

An assistant coach in football and basketball for the Vandals, Smith was the head baseball coach for the final fourteen seasons (1967–1980), then continued in the UI athletic department as equipment manager for the next seven years. When John L. Smith (b.1948) arrived on campus as an assistant football coach in 1982, both began using their middle initial to avoid confusion.

The last varsity game with neighbor Washington State was a home win on April 30, 1980, which was the first over the Cougars in thirteen years, breaking a losing streak of over forty games (with two ties) dating back to 1967. The final games for the program were less than two weeks later, two doubleheaders against Puget Sound: the Vandals swept on Friday, and were washed out on Saturday.

=== Club sport ===
Baseball resurfaced on campus as a club sport in the spring of 1984.

== Venues ==
=== MacLean Field ===
Idaho's ballpark from the early 1920s through 1966 was MacLean Field, just west of the Administration Building. Its infield was originally located in the southwest corner of the multi-sport venue, with Memorial Gymnasium as a backdrop in left field and the running track's west stretch in center and right field. After Neale Stadium opened for football in autumn 1937, home plate was moved to the opposite northeast corner of MacLean (46.726°N 117.0129°W) for the 1940 season, with the former football grandstand on the east berm along the third base line. The southern portion of the permanent football seating, adjacent to left field, was excess capacity for baseball and was removed during World War II.

The new southwestern alignment (home plate to center field) had abundant foul territory, especially along the third base line; track and field continued at MacLean until after the war, and this area was occupied by various field events. Other than a backstop, there was little foul territory fencing, except to protect a parking lot to the right; it also went without dugouts, as the teams sat on open benches. Later seasons employed a low temporary outfield fence, and new tennis courts in right field with perimeter chain-link fencing provided a higher permanent barrier; until 1955, the tennis courts were at the site of the library. The distance down the left field line in 1959 was 315 feet (96 m); and the approximate elevation of the diamond was 2,600 feet (790 m) above sea level.

The old southwest infield became the site of the multi-purpose field house (1949–75) in deep right center field. Unheated and floorless, it was razed after the enclosure of the Kibbie Dome in 1975 and was soon occupied by additional outdoor tennis courts; the trees that were along its east wall continue to stand. The swim center and P.E. building (women's gym), opened in 1970, are in the MacLean outfield, from right to center field. Left field continues today as open grass; its backdrop was the Shattuck Arboretum to the south and the berm between them provided elevated grass seating.

=== Guy Wicks Field ===
After the 1966 season, construction of the new College of Education building began behind home plate, and a new baseball field was built at the northwest area of campus, just south of Paradise Creek (and Pullman Road) (46.7316°N 117.0195°W). Aligned southeast with above-ground dugouts and a modest concrete grandstand, it opened as "University Field" in April 1967, and was named for late alumnus Guy Wicks, a two-sport head coach and university administrator, during the 1969 postseason. It was also without permanent fencing, and used a low temporary one in the outfield; the backdrop in left center was the six-story Wallace dormitory; the field elevation was approximately fifty feet (15 m) less than MacLean Field.

== See also ==
- List of defunct college baseball teams
