= 1969 Ole Miss Rebels baseball team =

American college baseball season

1969 Ole Miss Rebels baseball

SEC Western Division champion SEC Champion District III champion

College World Series, T-5th
- Conference: Southeastern Conference
- CB: No. 6
- Record: 27–15 (11–5 SEC)
- Head coach: Tom Swayze (19th season)
- Home stadium: Swayze Field

1969 Southeastern Conference baseball standings
	Conf.				Overall
Team	W		L	PCT	W		L	PCT
Eastern Division
Florida ^{x}‍‍‍^{y}	13	–	4	.765	28	–	17	.622
Tennessee ‍‍‍	9	–	5	.643	19	–	15	.559
Georgia ‍‍‍	9	–	8	.529	15	–	12	.556
Kentucky ‍‍‍	7	–	9	.438	15	–	19	.441
Auburn ‍‍‍	7	–	10	.412	17	–	15	.531
Vanderbilt ‍‍‍	3	–	12	.200	12	–	19	.387
Western Division
No. 6 Ole Miss ^{x}‍‍‡‍^{y}	11	–	5	.688	27	–	15	.643
Mississippi State ‍‍‍	11	–	7	.611	20	–	10	.667
Alabama ‍‍‍	8	–	9	.471	24	–	15	.615
LSU ‍‍‍	4	–	13	.235	11	–	24	.314
x – Division champion ‡ – Tournament champion y – Invited to the NCAA tournament As of June 30, 1969; Rankings from Collegiate Baseball

The 1969 Ole Miss Rebels baseball team represented the University of Mississippi in the 1969 NCAA University Division baseball season. The Rebels played their home games at Swayze Field. The team was coached by Tom Swayze in his 19th year as head coach at Ole Miss.

The Rebels won the District III to advance to the College World Series, where they were defeated by the Texas Longhorns.

== Roster ==
1969 Ole Miss Rebels baseball team
Players
Coaches

#	Pos.	Name	B/T	Height	Weight	Year	Home town
		Whitey Adams	/	—	—
	RHP	Buddy Bowen	/R	—	—
		Ward Brister	/	—	—
		Bobby Cain	/	—	—
		Ron Coleman	/	—	—
		Eric Duncan	/	—	—
		Mike Friday	/	—	—	So
		Mike Greenich	/	—	—
		Tom Iseminger	/	—	—
		Jim Izard	/	—	—
		Kenny Kauerz	/	—	—	Jr
		Tommy Magee	/	—	—	So
		Archie Manning	/R	—	—
	C	M. A. McCoy	/	—	—
		Eddie McLarty	/	—	—
		Lee Moore	/	—	—
	C	Mooney	/	—	—
		Joe Musgrave	/	—	—
		Riley Myers	/	—	—	So
	OF	Kenny Oakley	/	—	—
		Fred Setser	/	—	—
		John Shaw	R/	—	—
		Bobby Wade	/	—	—
		Norris Weese	/	—	—	Jr
		Keith Welsh	/	—	—	Jr
		Ken Wilkinson	/	—	—
		Charlie Williams	/	—	—	Jr

Head coach

Tom Swayze

Assistant coach(es)

Charlie Williams
Grafton Moore

Legend

- (C) Team captain
- (S) Suspended
- (I) Ineligible
- Injured
- Current redshirt

Roster
Last update: April 8, 2021

== Schedule ==
1969 Ole Miss Rebels baseball game log
Regular season
March (5–4)

#	Date	Opponent	Site/stadium	Score	Overall record	SEC record
1	March 17	Delta State	Swayze Field • Oxford, Mississippi	2–6	0–1	–
2	March 21	Southern Mississippi	Swayze Field • Oxford, Mississippi	7–1	1–1	–
3	March 22	Southern Mississippi	Swayze Field • Oxford, Mississippi	4–3	2–1	–
4	March 24	Kansas State	Swayze Field • Oxford, Mississippi	0–1	2–2	–
5	March 24	Kansas State	Swayze Field • Oxford, Mississippi	9–3	3–2	–
6	March 25	Kansas State	Swayze Field • Oxford, Mississippi	4–11	3–3	–
7	March 25	Kansas State	Swayze Field • Oxford, Mississippi	10–0	4–3	–
8	March 26	Tennessee	Swayze Field • Oxford, Mississippi	8–5	5–3	–
9	March 31	vs Indiana	Unknown • Riverside, California	11–13	5–4	–

Postseason
April (13–6)

#	Date	Opponent	Site/stadium	Score	Overall record	SEC record
10	April 1	vs Illinois	Unknown • Riverside, California	5–8	5–5	–
11	April 2	vs Southern California	Unknown • Riverside, California	6–7	5–6	–
12	April 2	vs BYU	Unknown • Riverside, California	0–5	5–7	–
13	April 4	at UC Riverside	Unknown • Riverside, California	13–7	6–7	–
14	April 4	vs UCLA	Unknown • Riverside, California	2–5	6–8	–
15	April 5	vs Delaware	Unknown • Riverside, California	5–3	7–8	–
16	April 7	Mississippi State	Swayze Field • Oxford, Mississippi	4–0	8–8	1–0
17	April 7	Mississippi State	Swayze Field • Oxford, Mississippi	2–1	9–8	2–0
18	April 8	Mississippi State	Swayze Field • Oxford, Mississippi	4–3	10–8	3–0
19	April 11	at LSU	Alex Box Stadium • Baton Rouge, Louisiana	7–3	11–8	4–0
20	April 11	at LSU	Alex Box Stadium • Baton Rouge, Louisiana	4–1	12–8	5–0
21	April 15	Arkansas State	Swayze Field • Oxford, Mississippi	8–3	13–8	5–0
22	April 16	Arkansas State	Swayze Field • Oxford, Mississippi	5–4	14–8	5–0
23	April 18	Alabama	Swayze Field • Starkville, Mississippi	1–4	14–9	5–1
24	April 18	Alabama	Swayze Field • Oxford, Mississippi	12–1	15–9	6–1
25	April 25	LSU	Swayze Field • Oxford, Mississippi	2–0	16–9	7–1
26	April 25	LSU	Swayze Field • Oxford, Mississippi	2–3	16–10	7–2
27	April 26	LSU	Swayze Field • Oxford, Mississippi	6–4	17–10	8–2
28	April 29	Birmingham–Southern	Swayze Field • Oxford, Mississippi	11–1	18–10	8–2

May (3–3)

#	Date	Opponent	Site/stadium	Score	Overall record	SEC record
29	May 2	at Alabama	Sewell–Thomas Stadium • Tuscaloosa, Alabama	2–1	19–10	9–2
30	May 2	at Alabama	Sewell–Thomas Stadium • Tuscaloosa, Alabama	8–0	20–10	10–2
31	May 3	at Alabama	Sewell–Thomas Stadium • Tuscaloosa, Alabama	3–2	21–10	11–2
32	May 9	at Mississippi State	Dudy Noble Field • Starkville, Mississippi	0–2	21–11	11–3
33	May 9	at Mississippi State	Dudy Noble Field • Starkville, Mississippi	5–11	21–12	11–4
34	May 10	at Mississippi State	Dudy Noble Field • Starkville, Mississippi	3–10	21–13	11–5

Postseason
SEC Conference Championship (2–0)

#	Date	Opponent	Site/stadium	Score	Overall record	SEC record
35	May 14	Florida	Sawyze Field • Oxford, Mississippi	8–2	22–13	11–5
36	May 16	at Florida	Perry Field • Gainesville, Florida	4–1	23–13	11–5

NCAA District III Playoff (3–0)

#	Date	Opponent	Site/stadium	Score	Overall record	SEC record
37	May 29	vs Virginia Tech	Sims Legion Park • Gastonia, North Carolina	7–6	24–13	11–5
38	May 30	vs North Carolina	Sims Legion Park • Gastonia, North Carolina	6–5	25–13	11–5
39	May 31	vs North Carolina	Sims Legion Park • Gastonia, North Carolina	5–2	26–13	11–5

College World Series (1–2)

#	Date	Opponent	Site/stadium	Score	Overall record	SEC record
40	June 14	vs NYU	Johnny Rosenblatt Stadium • Omaha, Nebraska	3–8	26–14	11–5
41	June 15	vs Southern Illinois	Johnny Rosenblatt Stadium • Omaha, Nebraska	8–1	27–14	11–5
42	June 16	vs Texas	Johnny Rosenblatt Stadium • Omaha, Nebraska	1–14	27–15	11–5

== Awards and honors ==
Whitey Adams

- All-SEC
- All-SEC Western Division

Ed McLarty

- All-SEC
- All-SEC Western Division

Fred Setser

- All-SEC
- All-SEC Western Division

John Shaw

- All-SEC
- All-SEC Western Division
