= John Dolinsek =

American baseball player

- Outfielder / First baseman
- Born: January 3, 1948 (age 78); Santa Rosa, California, U.S.
- Bats: Left Throws: Left
- Stats at Baseball Reference

John N. Dolinsek (born January 3, 1948) is an American former baseball outfielder and first baseman, most notable for winning the College World Series Most Outstanding Player award as a member of the 1969 Arizona State Sun Devils baseball team. Listed at 6 feet 2 inches (1.88 m) and 185 pounds (84 kg), he batted and threw left-handed.

== Biography ==
Dolinsek played college baseball at Arizona State University. In his junior year, the team qualified for the 1969 College World Series. After losing their first game, the team advance through the loser's bracket to the semifinals. They won their remaining games, culminating with a 10–1 victory over the Tulsa Golden Hurricane for the championship. Dolinsek was selected as the College World Series Most Outstanding Player, becoming one of five players from Arizona State to win the award (the others are Sal Bando, Ron Davini, Bob Horner and Stan Holmes).

Selected by the Houston Astros in the eighth round of the 1969 Major League Baseball draft, Dolinsek played five years in Minor League Baseball. He played for the Covington Astros in 1969, batting .301 with seven home runs in 59 games. For the Columbus Astros in 1970, he hit .296 with eight home runs in 137 games. In 1971, he played for the Oklahoma City 89ers at the Triple-A level, hitting .288 with 14 home runs and 70 RBIs in 124 games. He split the 1972 season between the 89ers and Peninsula Whips, hitting a combined .296 with 11 home runs in 442 at bats. He played his final professional season in 1973, for the Denver Bears, hitting .274 with nine home runs in 118 games.

Overall, Dolinsek appeared in 570 minor league games, batting .290 with 49 home runs and 287 RBIs. Defensively, he made 293 appearances in the outfield and 275 appearances at first base, registering .972 and .988 fielding percentages, respectively.
