= 1969 NCAA University Division baseball tournament =

American college sports championship

- Season: 1969
- Teams: 23
- Finals site: Johnny Rosenblatt Stadium; Omaha, NE
- Champions: Arizona State (3rd title)
- Runner-up: Tulsa (1st CWS Appearance)
- Winning coach: Bobby Winkles (3rd title)
- MOP: John Dolinsek (Arizona State)

The 1969 NCAA University Division baseball tournament was played at the end of the 1969 NCAA University Division baseball season to determine the national champion of college baseball. The tournament concluded with eight teams competing in the College World Series, a double-elimination tournament in its twenty-third year. Eight regional districts sent representatives to the College World Series with preliminary rounds within each district serving to determine each representative. These events would later become known as regionals. Each district had its own format for selecting teams, resulting in 23 teams participating in the tournament at the conclusion of their regular season, and in some cases, after a conference tournament. The twenty-third tournament's champion was Arizona State, coached by Bobby Winkles. The Most Outstanding Player was John Dolinsek of Arizona State.

== Tournament ==
The opening rounds of the tournament were played across eight district sites across the country, each consisting of between two and four teams. The winners of each District advanced to the College World Series.

Bold indicates winner.

=== District 1 at Amherst, MA ===
Semifinals
**Boston University**	**13***
Dartmouth	10*
**UMass**	**5**
Dartmouth	3

Finals
Boston University	6	1
**UMass**	**8**	**6**

=== District 2 at Coplay, PA ===
Semifinals
**Colgate**	**4**
Seton Hall	3
**NYU**	**5**
Seton Hall	3

Finals
Colgate	1	**7**	1
**NYU**	**5**	1	**5**

=== District 3 at Gastonia, NC ===
Quarterfinals
**Ole Miss**	**7***
Virginia Tech	6*
**North Carolina**	**3**
Furman	0
Lower round 1
**Virginia Tech**	**6**
Furman	3

Semifinals
**Ole Miss**	**6**
North Carolina	5
Lower final
Virginia Tech	1
**North Carolina**	**5**

Final
**Ole Miss**	5	—
North Carolina	2	—

=== District 4 at Minneapolis, MN ===
Quarterfinals
**Minnesota**	**11**
Ohio	8
**Southern Illinois**	**15**
Ball State	6
Lower round 1
**Ball State**	**4***
Ohio	3*

Semifinals
Minnesota	3*
**Southern Illinois**	**4***
Lower final
Minnesota	1
**Ball State**	**4**

Final
**Southern Illinois**	**4**	—
Ball State	3	—

=== District 5 at Tulsa, OK ===
Finals
**Tulsa**	**5***	**8**	—
Oklahoma State	4	4	—

=== District 6 at Austin, TX ===
Finals
**Texas**	**10**	**5**	—
Trinity	0	0	—

=== District 7 at Mesa, AZ ===
Moscow, ID				Mesa, AZ
				**Arizona State**	**7**	**3**	—
**Idaho**	**3**	**5**	—	Idaho	1	2	—
Air Force	1	4	—

=== District 8 at Los Angeles, CA ===
Finals
**UCLA**	**7**	**2**	—
Santa Clara	5	1	—

== College World Series ==
=== Participants ===
School	Conference	Record (conference)	Head coach	CWS appearances	CWS best finish	CWS record
Arizona State	WAC	51–10 (15–3)	Bobby Winkles	3 (last: 1967)	1st (1965, 1967)	11–4
Massachusetts	Yankee	21–8 (9–1)	Dick Berquist	1 (last: 1954)	5th (1954)	1–2
Ole Miss	SEC	26–13 (11–5)	Tom Swayze	2 (last: 1964)	4th (1956)	2–4
NYU	Independent	19–6–1	Larry Geracioti	1 (last: 1956)	7th (1956)	0–2
Southern Illinois	Independent	36–7	Joe Lutz	1 (last: 1968)	2nd (1968)	3–2
Texas	SWC	33–4 (14–2)	Cliff Gustafson	11 (last: 1968)	1st (1949, 1950)	21–19
Tulsa	MVC	36–3 (7–1)	Gene Shell	0 (last: none)	none	0–0
UCLA	Pac-8	42–10–1 (17–4)	Art Reichle	0 (last: none)	none	0–0

=== Results ===
==== Bracket ====
Upper round 1
Arizona State	0
Texas	4
UCLA	5
Tulsa	6^{10}
Southern Illinois	0
Massachusetts	2
Ole Miss	3
NYU	8

Upper round 2
Texas	2
Tulsa	4
Massachusetts	2
NYU	9
Lower round 1
Arizona State	2^{11}
UCLA	1
Southern Illinois	1
Ole Miss	8

Upper final
Tulsa	2
NYU	0
Lower round 2
Arizona State	4
Massachusetts	2
Ole Miss	1
Texas	14

Semifinals
Tulsa	3
Arizona State	11
NYU	3
Texas	2

Preliminary final
Arizona State	4
NYU	1

Final
Tulsa	1
Arizona State	10

*extra innings

==== Game results ====
Date	Game	Winner	Score	Loser	Notes
June 13	Game 1	Texas	4–0	Arizona State	
June 13	Game 2	Tulsa	6–5 (10 innings)	UCLA	
June 14	Game 3	Massachusetts	2–0	Southern Illinois	
June 14	Game 4	NYU	8–3	Ole Miss	
June 14	Game 5	Arizona State	2–1 (11 innings)	UCLA	UCLA eliminated
June 16	Game 6	Ole Miss	8–1	Southern Illinois	Southern Illinois eliminated
June 16	Game 7	Tulsa	4–2	Texas	
June 16	Game 8	NYU	9–2	Massachusetts	
June 17	Game 9	Texas	14–1	Ole Miss	Ole Miss eliminated
June 17	Game 10	Arizona State	4–2	Massachusetts	Massachusetts eliminated
June 17	Game 11	Tulsa	2–0	NYU	
June 18	Game 12	NYU	3–2	Texas	Texas eliminated
June 18	Game 13	Arizona State	11–3	Tulsa	
June 19	Game 14	Arizona State	4–1	NYU	NYU eliminated
June 20	Final	Arizona State	10–1	Tulsa	Arizona State wins CWS

=== All-Tournament Team ===
The following players were members of the All-Tournament Team.

Position	Player	School
P	Larry Gura	Arizona State
P	Burt Hooton	Texas
C	Billy Cotton	Arizona State
1B	Steve Caves	Tulsa
2B	Lou Bagwell	Texas
3B	Les Rogers	Tulsa
SS	Roger Detter	Arizona State
OF	Jim Cardasis	NYU
OF	John Dolinsek (MOP)	Arizona State
OF	Paul Powell	Arizona State

=== Notable players ===
- Arizona State: Jim Crawford, Ralph Dickenson, Larry Fritz, Larry Gura, Lerrin LaGrow, Paul Powell, Lenny Randle, Craig Swan
- Massachusetts: Bob Hansen
- Ole Miss: Steve Dillard, Archie Manning
- NYU: Ellsworth “Schottie” Jones
- Southern Illinois: Skip Pitlock, Mike Rogodzinski, Bill Stein, Steve Webber
- Texas: Dave Chalk, Larry Hardy, Burt Hooton, James Street
- Tulsa: Steve Rogers
- UCLA: Bill Bonham, Chris Chambliss, Mike Reinbach, Jim York

== See also ==
- 1969 NCAA College Division baseball tournament
- 1969 NAIA World Series
