= 1969 NYU Violets baseball team =

Baseball team

1969 NYU Violets baseball

District II Playoff

College World Series, 3rd
- Conference: Independent
- Record: 22–8–1
- Head coach: Larry Geracioti (10th season)
- Home stadium: Ohio Field

The 1969 NYU Violets baseball team represented New York University in the 1969 NCAA University Division baseball season. The Violets played their home games at Ohio Field. The team was coached by Larry Geracioti in his 10th year as head coach at NYU.

The Violots won the District II playoff to advance to the College World Series, where they were defeated by the Arizona State Sun Devils.

== Roster ==
1969 NYU Violets baseball team
Players
Coaches

#	Pos.	Name	B/T	Height	Weight	Year	Home town
	RHP	Art Brown	/R	—	—
	OF	Jim Cardasis	/	6 ft 1 in (1.85 m)	185 lb (84 kg)	Sr	Mount Vernon, New York

Head coach

Larry Geracioti

Assistant coach(es)

Legend

- (C) Team captain
- (S) Suspended
- (I) Ineligible
- Injured
- Current redshirt

== Schedule ==
1969 NYU Violets baseball game log
Regular season
March (5–0)

#	Date	Opponent	Site/stadium	Score	Overall record
1	March	vs Lehman	Unknown • Unknown	13–2	1–0
2	March	vs Vermont	Unknown • Unknown	5–0	2–0
3	March	vs Bates	Unknown • Unknown	2–0	3–0
4	March	vs Bates	Unknown • Unknown	9–2	4–0
5	March	vs Manhattan	Unknown • Unknown	8–7	5–0

April (4–5–1)

#	Date	Opponent	Site/stadium	Score	Overall record
6	April 7	vs Princeton	Unknown • Unknown	4–5	5–1
7	April 9	at Penn	River Field • Philadelphia, Pennsylvania	3–3	5–1–1
8	April	vs Yale	Unknown • Unknown	5–9	5–2–1
9	April 14	at St. John's	McCallen Field • New York, New York	2–3	5–3–1
10	April	vs Columbia	Unknown • Unknown	3–4	5–4–1
11	April	Fairleigh Dickinson	Ohio Field • New York, New York	5–0	6–4–1
12	April	vs Coast Guard	Unknown • Unknown	6–1	7–4–1
13	April	vs Iona	Unknown • Unknown	9–3	8–4–1
14	April	vs Queens	Unknown • Unknown	4–2	9–4–1
15	April	Army	Unknown • Unknown	7–8	9–5–1

May (8–0)

#	Date	Opponent	Site/stadium	Score	Overall record
16	May	vs Merchant Marine	Unknown • Unknown	26–2	10–5–1
17	May	vs CCNY	Unknown • Unknown	11–0	11–5–1
18	May 10	at Rutgers	Class of 1953 Complex - Gruninger Baseball Complex • Piscataway, New Jersey	8–4	12–5–1
19	May 15	at Navy	Unknown • Annapolis, Maryland	4–1	13–5–1
20	May 16	Temple	Ohio Field • New York, New York	6–5	14–5–1
21	May 17	vs Lafayette	Unknown • Unknown	15–3	15–5–1
22	May	vs Seton Hall	Unknown • Unknown	5–3	16–5–1

Postseason
NCAA District II Playoff (3–1)

#	Date	Opponent	Site/stadium	Score	Overall record
23	June	vs Seton Hall	Unknown • Coplay, Pennsylvania	5–3	17–5–1
24	June	vs Colgate	Unknown • Coplay, Pennsylvania	5–1	18–5–1
25	June	vs Colgate	Unknown • Coplay, Pennsylvania	1–7	18–6–1
26	June	vs Colgate	Unknown • Coplay, Pennsylvania	5–1	19–6–1

College World Series (3–2)

#	Date	Opponent	Site/stadium	Score	Overall record
27	June 14	vs Ole Miss	Johnny Rosenblatt Stadium • Omaha, Nebraska	8–3	20–6–1
28	June 16	vs Massachusetts	Johnny Rosenblatt Stadium • Omaha, Nebraska	9–2	21–6–1
29	June 17	vs Tulsa	Johnny Rosenblatt Stadium • Omaha, Nebraska	0–2	21–7–1
30	June 18	vs Texas	Johnny Rosenblatt Stadium • Omaha, Nebraska	3–2	22–7–1
31	June 19	vs Arizona State	Johnny Rosenblatt Stadium • Omaha, Nebraska	1–4	22–8–1

== Awards and honors ==
Jim Cardasis

- College World Series All-Tournament Team
