= 1969 NCAA University Division baseball season =

Baseball season

- Number of teams: 207

NCAA tournament

College World Series
- Champions: Arizona State (3rd title)
- Runners-up: Tulsa (1st CWS Appearance)
- Winning coach: Bobby Winkles (3rd title)
- MOP: John Dolinsek (Arizona State)

Seasons
- ← 1968 1970 →

The 1969 NCAA University Division baseball season, play of college baseball in the United States organized by the National Collegiate Athletic Association (NCAA) began in the spring of 1969. The season progressed through the regular season and concluded with the 1969 College World Series. The College World Series, held for the twenty third time in 1969, consisted of one team from each of eight geographical districts and was held in Omaha, Nebraska at Johnny Rosenblatt Stadium as a double-elimination tournament. Arizona State claimed the championship.

== Conference winners ==
This is a partial list of conference champions from the 1969 season. Each of the eight geographical districts chose, by various methods, the team that would represent them in the NCAA tournament. 9 teams earned automatic bids by winning their conference championship while 12 teams earned at-large selections.

Conference	Regular season winner
Atlantic Coast Conference	North Carolina
Big Eight Conference	Oklahoma State
Big Ten Conference	Minnesota
EIBL	Dartmouth
Mid-American Conference	Ohio
Pacific-8 Conference	UCLA
Southeastern Conference	Ole Miss
Southern Conference	North - William & Mary; South - Furman
Southwest Conference	Texas
Yankee Conference	UMass

== Conference standings ==
The following is an incomplete list of conference standings:

1969 Missouri Valley Conference baseball standings
	Conf.				Overall
Team	W		L	PCT	W		L	PCT
Eastern
Cincinnati ‍‍‍	5	–	1	.833	18	–	14	.563
Bradley ‍‍‍	4	–	2	.667	12	–	6	.667
Memphis State ‍‍‍	3	–	3	.500	20	–	12	.625
Louisville ‍‍‍	0	–	6	.000	9	–	13	.409
Western
No. 2 Tulsa ‍†‍‡‍^{y}	7	–	1	.875	39	–	5	.886
Wichita State ‍‍‍	5	–	3	.625	17	–	12	.586
Saint Louis ‍‍‍	2	–	5	.286	15	–	11	.577
Drake ‍‍‍	1	–	6	.143	7	–	11	.389
‡ – Tournament champion As of June 21, 1969; Rankings from Collegiate Baseball

1969 Southwest Conference baseball standings
	Conf.				Overall
Team	W		L	PCT	W		L	PCT
No. 4 Texas ‍†‍‍^{y}	14	–	2	.875	40	–	6	.870
TCU ‍‍‍	9	–	6	.600	22	–	8	.733
Texas Tech ‍‍‍	9	–	7	.563	13	–	13	.500
Rice ‍‍‍	7	–	6	.538	14	–	11	.560
Texas A&M ‍‍‍	7	–	8	.467	15	–	11	.577
Baylor ‍‍‍	6	–	11	.353	10	–	17	.370
SMU ‍‍‍	2	–	14	.125	5	–	21	.192
† – Conference champion y – Invited to the NCAA tournament As of June 30, 1969; Rankings from Collegiate Baseball

1969 Pacific-8 Conference baseball standings
	Conf.						Overall
Team	W		L		T	PCT	W		L		T	PCT
No. 8 UCLA ‍†‍‍^{y}	17	–	4	–	0	.810	42	–	12	–	1	.773
No. 16 Stanford ‍‍‍	16	–	5	–	0	.762	34	–	12	–	0	.739
No. 17 Southern California ‍‍‍	13	–	5	–	0	.722	39	–	12	–	1	.760
No. 29 California ‍‍‍	12	–	9	–	0	.571	31	–	19	–	0	.620
Oregon State ‍‍‍	9	–	12	–	0	.429	17	–	20	–	1	.461
Oregon ‍‍‍	8	–	13	–	0	.381	22	–	19	–	0	.537
Washington State ‍‍‍	8	–	13	–	0	.381	27	–	15	–	0	.643
Washington ‍‍‍	1	–	20	–	0	.048	7	–	29	–	0	.194
† – Conference champion y – Invited to the NCAA tournament As of June 30, 1969; Rankings from Collegiate Baseball

1969 Western Athletic Conference baseball standings
	Conf.				Overall
Team	W		L	PCT	W		L	PCT
Northern
No. 18 BYU ‍‍‍	13	–	5	.722	30	–	15	.667
Wyoming ‍‍‍	11	–	7	.611	14	–	22	.389
Utah ‍‍‍	7	–	11	.389	20	–	22	.476
Colorado State ‍‍‍	5	–	13	.278	13	–	20	.394
Southern
No. 1 Arizona State ‍‍‍^{y}	15	–	3	.833	56	–	11	.836
No. 19 Arizona ‍‍‍	10	–	8	.556	37	–	10	.787
New Mexico ‍‍‍	7	–	11	.389	31	–	17	.646
UTEP ‍‍‍	4	–	14	.222	17	–	27	.386
† – Conference champion y – Invited to the NCAA tournament As of June 30, 1969; Rankings from Collegiate Baseball

1969 Southeastern Conference baseball standings
	Conf.				Overall
Team	W		L	PCT	W		L	PCT
Eastern Division
Florida ^{x}‍‍‍^{y}	13	–	4	.765	28	–	17	.622
Tennessee ‍‍‍	9	–	5	.643	19	–	15	.559
Georgia ‍‍‍	9	–	8	.529	15	–	12	.556
Kentucky ‍‍‍	7	–	9	.438	15	–	19	.441
Auburn ‍‍‍	7	–	10	.412	17	–	15	.531
Vanderbilt ‍‍‍	3	–	12	.200	12	–	19	.387
Western Division
No. 6 Ole Miss ^{x}‍‍‡‍^{y}	11	–	5	.688	27	–	15	.643
Mississippi State ‍‍‍	11	–	7	.611	20	–	10	.667
Alabama ‍‍‍	8	–	9	.471	24	–	15	.615
LSU ‍‍‍	4	–	13	.235	11	–	24	.314
x – Division champion ‡ – Tournament champion y – Invited to the NCAA tournament As of June 30, 1969; Rankings from Collegiate Baseball

1969 Yankee Conference baseball standings
	Conf.				Overall
Team	W		L	PCT	W		L	PCT
No. 5 UMass ‍†‍‍^{y}	9	–	1	.900	22	–	10	.688
Connecticut ‍‍‍	6	–	4	.600	10	–	16	.385
Maine ‍‍‍	6	–	4	.600	12	–	12	.500
Vermont ‍‍‍	5	–	5	.500	13	–	9	.591
Rhode Island ‍‍‍	2	–	8	.200	4	–	13	.235
New Hampshire ‍‍‍	2	–	8	.200	6	–	15	.286
† – Conference champion y – Invited to the NCAA tournament As of June 30, 1969; Rankings from Collegiate Baseball

== College World Series ==
The 1969 season marked the twenty third NCAA baseball tournament, which culminated with the eight team College World Series. The College World Series was held in Omaha, Nebraska. The eight teams played a double-elimination format, with Arizona State claiming their third championship with a 10–1 win over Tulsa in the final.

Upper round 1
Arizona State	0
Texas	4
UCLA	5
Tulsa	6^{10}
Southern Illinois	0
Massachusetts	2
Ole Miss	3
NYU	8

Upper round 2
Texas	2
Tulsa	4
Massachusetts	2
NYU	9
Lower round 1
Arizona State	2^{11}
UCLA	1
Southern Illinois	1
Ole Miss	8

Upper final
Tulsa	2
NYU	0
Lower round 2
Arizona State	4
Massachusetts	2
Ole Miss	1
Texas	14

Semifinals
Tulsa	3
Arizona State	11
NYU	3
Texas	2

Preliminary final
Arizona State	4
NYU	1

Final
Tulsa	1
Arizona State	10
