= Bob Hansen (baseball) =

American baseball player (born 1948)

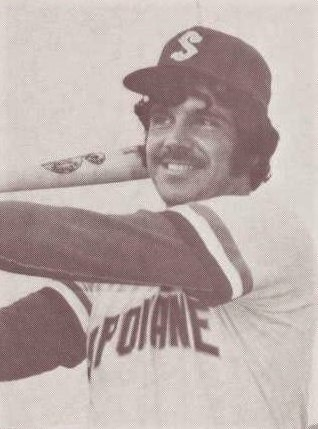
- First baseman
- Born: May 26, 1948 (age 77); Boston, Massachusetts, U.S.
- Batted: Left Threw: Left

Professional debut
- MLB: May 10, 1974, for the Milwaukee Brewers
- NPB: April 2, 1977, for the Crown Lighter Lions

Last appearance
- MLB: June 10, 1976, for the Milwaukee Brewers
- NPB: September 30, 1978, for the Crown Lighter Lions

MLB statistics
- Batting average: .242
- Home runs: 2
- Runs batted in: 13
- Stolen bases: 2
- Stats at Baseball Reference

Teams
- Milwaukee Brewers (1974, 1976); Crown Lighter Lions (1977–1988)

Robert Joseph Hansen (born May 26, 1948) is an American former professional first baseman who played in Major League Baseball for the Milwaukee Brewers in 1974 and 1976.

== Biography ==
A native of Boston, Massachusetts, Hansen played at the collegiate level at the University of Massachusetts Amherst. From 1966 to 1969, he played four seasons of collegiate summer baseball in the Cape Cod Baseball League (CCBL), three with the Cotuit Kettleers, and a final season with the Orleans Cardinals, and was a three-time CCBL all-star.

Hansen was selected by the Seattle Pilots in the twenty-first round of the 1969 Major League Baseball draft. He remained in the organization through its move to Milwaukee, Wisconsin to become the Milwaukee Brewers. During his time with the Brewers, he played at the major league level in 1974 and 1976, posting a career batting average of .242 in 158 plate appearances over 82 games.

Hansen was inducted into the Cape Cod Baseball League Hall of Fame in 2008.
