= 1969 Tulsa Golden Hurricane baseball team =

American college baseball season

1969 Tulsa Golden Hurricane baseball

District 5 champions

College World Series, Runner-Up
- Conference: Missouri Valley Conference
- Record: 39–5 (7–1 MVC)
- Head coach: Gene Shell (5th season)

1969 Missouri Valley Conference baseball standings
	Conf.				Overall
Team	W		L	PCT	W		L	PCT
Eastern
Cincinnati ‍‍‍	5	–	1	.833	18	–	14	.563
Bradley ‍‍‍	4	–	2	.667	12	–	6	.667
Memphis State ‍‍‍	3	–	3	.500	20	–	12	.625
Louisville ‍‍‍	0	–	6	.000	9	–	13	.409
Western
No. 2 Tulsa ‍†‍‡‍^{y}	7	–	1	.875	39	–	5	.886
Wichita State ‍‍‍	5	–	3	.625	17	–	12	.586
Saint Louis ‍‍‍	2	–	5	.286	15	–	11	.577
Drake ‍‍‍	1	–	6	.143	7	–	11	.389
‡ – Tournament champion As of June 21, 1969; Rankings from Collegiate Baseball

The 1969 Tulsa Golden Hurricane baseball team represented the University of Tulsa in the 1969 NCAA University Division baseball season. The Golden Hurricane played their home games at . The team was coached by Gene Shell in his 5th season at Tulsa.

The Golden Hurricane lost the College World Series, defeated by the Arizona State Sun Devils in the championship game.

== Roster ==
1969 Tulsa Golden Hurricane roster
Pitchers: Craig Bothwell; Cliff Butcher; Steve Chrisman; Steve Rogers; Reg Rowe; Vince Shawver; Jay Weinheimer	Infielders: Roger Adams; Steve Caves; Phil Honeycutt; Les Rogers; Jim Silvey; Catchers: John Klahr; Bob Murphy	Outfielders: Larry Byrd; Tom Jenkins; Tim Rector; Roger Whitaker; Unknown: Jim Blackburn; Pat Carleton; Ken Petruck; Coaches: Gene Shell - 5th Season

== Schedule ==
1969 Tulsa Golden Hurricane baseball game log
Regular season
March

Date	Opponent	Site/stadium	Score	Overall Record	MVC Record

April

Date	Opponent	Site/stadium	Score	Overall Record	MVC Record

May

Date	Opponent	Site/stadium	Score	Overall Record	MVC Record

Postseason
Midwest II Regional (2–0)

Opponent	Site/stadium	Score	Overall Record	NCAAT Record
vs Oklahoma State	Unknown • Tulsa, OK	5–4	35–3	1–0
vs Oklahoma State	Unknown • Tulsa, OK	8–4	36–3	2–0

1969 College World Series (3–2)

Date	Opponent	Site/stadium	Score	Overall Record	CWS Record
June 13	vs UCLA	Johnny Rosenblatt Stadium • Omaha, NE	6–5	37–2	1–0
June 16	vs Texas	Johnny Rosenblatt Stadium • Omaha, NE	4–2	38–2	2–0
June 17	vs New York	Johnny Rosenblatt Stadium • Omaha, NE	2–0	39–3	3–0
June 18	vs Arizona State	Johnny Rosenblatt Stadium • Omaha, NE	11–3	39–4	4–0
June 20	vs Arizona State	Johnny Rosenblatt Stadium • Omaha, NE	10–1	39–5	4–1

== Awards and honors ==
Steve Caves

- All-Tournament Team

Les Rogers

- All-Tournament Team

== Golden Hurricane in the 1969 MLB draft ==
The following members of the Tulsa Golden Hurricane baseball program were drafted in the 1969 Major League Baseball draft.

Round	Pick	Player	Position	MLB Club
34	781	Bob Murphy	1B	New York Mets
