= Ralph Dickenson =

Canadian baseball player and coach (born 1948)

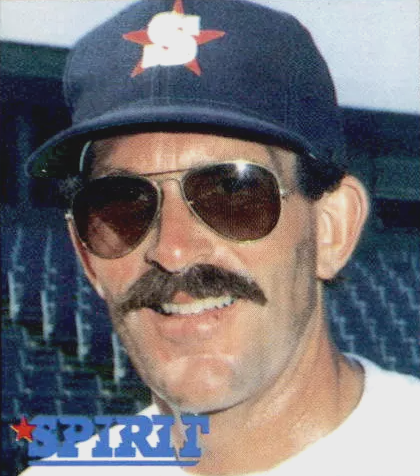
- Dickenson with the San Bernardino Spirit c. 1988
- Outfielder / Coach
- Born: Ralph D. Dick; March 22, 1948 (age 78); Nanaimo, British Columbia, Canada
- Bats: Right Throws: Right
- Stats at Baseball Reference

Career highlights and awards
- College World Series champion (1969)

Ralph D. Dickenson (né Dick; born March 22, 1948) is a Canadian professional baseball player and coach.

== Career ==
Dickenson graduated from Bellingham High School in Bellingham, Washington in 1966.

Dickenson was drafted in the 30th round of the 1968 Major League Baseball draft by the San Francisco Giants out of Mesa Community College and the first round of the secondary phase of the 1969 draft by the Minnesota Twins out of Arizona State University. He was part of the 1969 College World Series championship Arizona State Sun Devils. He played minor league ball from 1969 to 1974 in the Twins chain, never advancing above Class A.

In 1969, Ralph hit .192/.256/.238 as an outfielder with the Red Springs Twins, producing just 16 runs in 50 games. He split 1970 between the St. Cloud Rox and Wisconsin Rapids Twins, improving to a composite .260 between the two stops. In 1971, he batted .302 between the Orlando Twins and Auburn Twins, in limited action afield. He also pitched, going 7–5 with a 4.46 ERA for Auburn. He tied for 5th in the New York–Penn League in wins but also led in hits allowed (114), runs allowed (64) and tied for the most earned runs allowed (51).

Dickenson improved to 3-2 with a save and a 1.72 ERA in 16 games pitched for the 1972 Lynchburg Twins while hitting .280/.357/.360 in 200 at-bats. He fielded .970 in the outfield as a fine two-way player. With Lynchburg in '73, he was 8–8 with seven saves and a 3.10 ERA in 41 outings. Had he qualified, he would have been 8th in the Carolina League in ERA. He wrapped up his playing career still with Lynchburg in 1974, going 11–6 with four saves a 2.98 ERA in 56 games. He was 8th in the Carolina League in ERA, the only regularly-used reliever to make the top 10.

After being released by the Twins, he returned home to Bellingham and began working at a sporting goods store. Shortly thereafter, he was hired as the head baseball coach at Western Washington University. He held that position until 1978.

He was the pitching coach for the Bellingham Dodgers in 1976 and managed the Grays Harbor Loggers in 1977. He also got into three games for the Loggers, getting a hit in his trip to the plate and losing his decision on the mound.

Dickenson was an assistant coach at Washington State University from 1979 to 1986 and the University of New Mexico in 1987. Between 1988 and 1989, he was the manager of the San Bernardino Spirit. During that time, the team had a record of 157–127 (.553). Between 1993 and 1995, he managed the Arizona League Brewers to a record of 95–73 (.565).

Dickenson was the Minor League Hitting Coordinator for the Seattle Mariners from 1990 to 1992 and Milwaukee Brewers from 1996 to 1997 in addition to managing assignments in from 1988 to 1989 and 1993 to 1995. He was the Brewers' Minor League Field Coordinator from 1998 to 2000. He was Minor League Hitting Coordinator for the Los Angeles Dodgers from 2000 to 2001, the Montreal Expos from 2001 to 2002, and the Texas Rangers from 2002 to 2004. Dickenson was a minor league hitting coach for the New York Yankees from 2005 to 2006 and the Minor League Hitting Coordinator for the Washington Nationals from 2007 to 2009. Dickenson was a coach for the New Hampshire Fisher Cats in 2010 and the Dunedin Blue Jays from 2011 to 2012.

The Houston Astros hired Dickenson as their assistant hitting coach for 2014.

== Personal life ==
In the 1980s, his children changed their surname from Dick to Dickenson. In 1989 or 1990, Dickenson did the same after moving to Flagstaff, Arizona. Dickenson said "Growing up with the last name Dick is not the greatest thing."
