= Northern Pacific Conference (baseball) =

The Northern Pacific Conference (Nor-Pac) was formed for baseball for the 1975 season and comprised the NCAA programs in the Northwest not in the Pacific-8 Conference. The Big Sky Conference had dropped sponsorship of the sport after the 1974 season, and its three remaining baseball programs (Gonzaga, Idaho, Boise State) joined Portland State, Portland, Seattle U., and Puget Sound. An eighth team, Eastern Washington, was added after the 1979 season.

Idaho and Boise State dropped varsity baseball after the 1980 season while Seattle U. dropped its athletic program to the NAIA level, and the five-team Nor-Pac played a seventh and final season in 1981. Puget Sound dropped its program and the remaining four (GU, EWU, PSU, UP) joined the Northern division of the Pac-10 (as affiliate members, baseball only) for 1982; Oregon also discontinued baseball after 1981, which had left just three teams (Washington, Washington State, and Oregon State). In the Pac-10, the champion of the seven-team Northern division met the runner-up of the stronger six-team Southern division in a best-of-three series for the conference's second berth in the NCAA tournament.

Eastern Washington dropped baseball in 1990, and Portland State eight years later; after 1995, Gonzaga and Portland moved their baseball to the West Coast Conference (WCC), where their other sports were. Baseball returned at Oregon in 2009, Seattle U. in 2010, and briefly at Boise State for a pandemic-shortened 2020 season before being eliminated a second time due to a budget reduction.

== Champions ==
Year	Champion	Runner-up	Members	Notes
1975	Puget Sound	Gonzaga	7	
1976	Gonzaga	Boise State	7	
1977	Portland State	Gonzaga	7	
1978	Gonzaga	Portland State	7	
1979	Portland	Portland State	7	
1980	Gonzaga	Portland	8	
1981	Gonzaga (4)	E. Washington	5	
