= Paul Powell (baseball) =

American baseball player (born 1948)

Paul Ray Powell
- Outfielder / Catcher
- Born: March 19, 1948 (age 78); San Angelo, Texas, U.S.
- Batted: Right Threw: Right

MLB debut
- April 7, 1971, for the Minnesota Twins

Last MLB appearance
- September 3, 1975, for the Los Angeles Dodgers

MLB statistics
- Batting average: .167
- Home runs: 1
- Runs batted in: 2
- Stats at Baseball Reference

Teams
- Minnesota Twins (1971); Los Angeles Dodgers (1973, 1975)

Paul Ray Powell (born March 19, 1948) is an American former professional baseball player. Powell was the seventh player selected overall, and the first round pick of the Minnesota Twins, in the 1969 Major League Baseball draft. But he would appear in only in 39 MLB games over parts of three seasons as an outfielder and catcher for the Twins (1971) and Los Angeles Dodgers (1973 and 1975). Although modern sources list him only by his first name, during his baseball career he was referred to as "Paul Ray" Powell.

Born in San Angelo, Texas, Powell threw and batted right-handed, stood 5 feet 11 inches (1.80 m) tall and weighed 185 pounds (84 kg). After graduating from Santa Cruz Valley Union High School in Eloy, Arizona, he attended Arizona State University, where he was the starting center fielder for ASU's 1969 championship team and a defensive back and placekicker on the Sun Devils' 1967 and 1968 football teams. He received his degree in secondary education in 1974.

Powell's pro career lasted for seven years, through 1975. As a major leaguer he collected seven hits, including a double and a home run, in 42 at bats (.167). His lone home run came in his third game in MLB on April 10, 1971, a solo blow off Don Eddy of the Chicago White Sox at Comiskey Park. Defensively, he played 801/3 innings in the outfield, and 24 as a catcher.

After leaving baseball, Powell had a long career in the real estate industry in Arizona.
