= Art Reichle =

American baseball coach (1914–2000)

- Born: February 23, 1914
- Died: May 23, 2000 (aged 86)

Arthur E. Reichle (February 23, 1914 – May 23, 2000) was the head coach of the UCLA Bruins baseball in 1941 and from 1946 to 1974. He had a career record of 747–582–12. He was inducted into the UCLA Athletics Hall of Fame in 1998. One of the players he coached at UCLA was Jackie Robinson. He died at the age of 86 on May 23, 2000.

Led by Chris Chambliss, his 1969 team won the Pacific-8 Conference Championship and played in the College World Series, first appearance for the university.

He was a student-athlete at UCLA from 1934–36, playing football, rugby and baseball. He married his wife Ruth and they had three children, sons Arthur Jr. and Richard and daughter Denise Margarit.
