= Bobby Winkles =

American baseball coach and manager (1930–2020)

- Winkles in 1972
- Manager
- Born: March 11, 1930; Tuckerman, Arkansas, U.S.
- Died: April 17, 2020 (aged 90); Indian Wells, California, U.S.

MLB statistics
- Managerial record: 170–213
- Winning %: .444
- Stats at Baseball Reference
- Managerial record at Baseball Reference

Teams
- As manager: California Angels (1973–1974); Oakland Athletics (1977–1978); As coach: California Angels (1972); Oakland Athletics (1974–1975); San Francisco Giants (1976–1977); Chicago White Sox (1979–1981); Montreal Expos (1986–1988)

Career highlights and awards
- World Series champion (1974)
Coaching career
Coaching career (HC unless noted)
1959–1971	Arizona State
Head coaching record
Overall	524–173 (.752) (college)
Accomplishments and honors
Championships
3× College World Series (1965, 1967, 1969)

Bobby Brooks Winkles (March 11, 1930 – April 17, 2020) was an American baseball player and coach. After an eight-year career as an infielder in the minor leagues, he became the acclaimed college baseball coach at Arizona State University (ASU) in 1959. Then, 13 years later, he returned to professional baseball as a manager, coach, front-office executive and broadcaster in the major leagues.

Born in Tuckerman, Arkansas, and raised in nearby Swifton, Winkles was a graduate of Illinois Wesleyan University, where he became a member of the Sigma Chi fraternity. A right-handed-hitting and -throwing shortstop, he played minor league baseball in the Chicago White Sox organization between 1951 and 1958, hitting .270 with 890 hits in 858 games played before retiring to become Arizona State's head baseball coach at age 29.

== Arizona State ==
From 1959 to 1971 Winkles was the ASU Sun Devil baseball program's first varsity head coach. His overall record while head coach at ASU was 524–173, a winning percentage of .751, and he led ASU to its first three national titles (1965, 1967 and 1969). He also coached several notable players while he was at the helm of the Sun Devils, including Rick Monday, Sal Bando, Reggie Jackson, Sterling Slaughter and Larry Gura. Winkles was named the 1965 and 1969 NCAA Coach of the Year and The Sporting News Coach of the Year in 1965, 1967 and 1969. Winkles was inducted into the ABCA Collegiate Baseball Hall of Fame in 1997. His No. 1 jersey was honored at Packard Stadium and the field was named in his honor.

== Big league career ==
In 1972, Winkles jumped from the Arizona State campus to the major leagues as a coach for the California Angels of the American League. In 1973, Winkles became the Angels' manager, succeeding Del Rice. His 1973 club won 79, lost 83 and finished fourth in the American League West Division. But in 1974, the Angels lost 44 of their first 75 games and Winkles was fired on June 26 and replaced with Dick Williams.

On July 8, two weeks after the Angels fired him, Winkles became third base coach for the Oakland Athletics and was a member of their 1974 World Series championship team as well as their 1975 AL West champions under skipper Alvin Dark. After Dark's firing, Winkles then spent 1976 through June 25, 1977, as a coach for the cross-bay San Francisco Giants.

On June 26, Winkles returned to the Athletics to manage Oakland for parts of the 1977 and 1978 seasons, as he replaced (in 1977) and then was succeeded by (in 1978) the same manager: Jack McKeon. The A's were then a struggling outfit in the final throes of the Charlie Finley era. But Winkles's 1978 team roared to a 19–5 start by May 5, and was still 24–15 after sweeping a doubleheader against the White Sox on May 21 when Winkles resigned two days later on May 23 despite the club being in first place in the American League West. The primary reason behind his resignation was Finley's micro-management style. By extension, he had also grown tired of Finley's hand-picked vice president Stanley Burrell. His final managerial record: 170 wins, 213 defeats (.444).

A coaching stint with the White Sox immediately followed Winkles's 1978 resignation as the A's manager, and he was a member of the White Sox staff through 1981. Then, from 1982 to 1985, Winkles led the Chisox' player development department. He joined the Montreal Expos as a coach from 1986 through 1988, and then moved into the broadcast booth as an analyst on the Expos' radio network from 1989 through 1993. In 2006, he was inducted into the College Baseball Hall of Fame.
