= 1969 Major League Baseball draft =

Baseball draft of amateur players by Major League Baseball

Overview
- First selection: Jeff Burroughs; Washington Senators
- First round selections: 24
- Hall of Famers: 2: P Bert Blyleven; OF Dave Winfield

The 1969 Major League Baseball draft took place prior to the 1969 MLB season. The draft featured future Hall of Famers Bert Blyleven (pick 55) and Dave Winfield (pick 882).

== First round selections ==
= All-Star	= Baseball Hall of Famer

The following are the first round picks in the 1969 Major League Baseball draft.

Pick	Player	Team	Position	Hometown/School
1	Jeff Burroughs	Washington Senators	OF	Long Beach, California
2	J. R. Richard	Houston Astros	RHP	Ruston, Louisiana
3	Ted Nicholson	Chicago White Sox	3B	Laurel, Mississippi
4	Randy Sterling	New York Mets	RHP	Key West, Florida
5	* Alan Bannister	California Angels	SS	Buena Park, California
6	Mike Anderson	Philadelphia Phillies	1B	Timmonsville, South Carolina
7	Paul Ray Powell	Minnesota Twins	OF	Arizona State University
8	Terry McDermott	Los Angeles Dodgers	C	West Hempstead, New York
9	Don Stanhouse	Oakland Athletics	RHP	DuQuoin, Illinois
10	Bob May	Pittsburgh Pirates	RHP	Merritt Island, Florida
11	Charlie Spikes	New York Yankees	3B-OF	Bogalusa, Louisiana
12	Gene Holbert	Atlanta Braves	C	Campbelltown, Pennsylvania
13	Noel Jenke	Boston Red Sox	OF	University of Minnesota
14	Don Gullett	Cincinnati Reds	LHP	Lynn, Kentucky
15	Alvin McGrew	Cleveland Indians	OF	Fairfield, Alabama
16	Roger Metzger	Chicago Cubs	SS	St. Edward's University
17	Don Hood	Baltimore Orioles	LHP	Florence, South Carolina
18	Mike Phillips	San Francisco Giants	SS	Irving, Texas
19	John Young	Detroit Tigers	1B	Redding, California
20	Richard Minott	St. Louis Cardinals	LHP	Covina, California
21	Gorman Thomas	Seattle Pilots	SS	Charleston, South Carolina
22	Balor Moore	Montreal Expos	LHP	Deer Park, Texas
23	* John Simmons	Kansas City Royals	SS	Childersburg, AL
24	Randy Elliott	San Diego Padres	1B	Camarillo, California

* Did not sign

== Other notable selections ==
= All-Star	= Baseball Hall of Famer

Round	Pick	Player	Team	Position
2	40	Larry Gura	Chicago Cubs	Pitcher
3	55	Bert Blyleven	Minnesota Twins	Pitcher
3	62	Rawly Eastwick	Cincinnati Reds	Pitcher
5	107	Dwight Evans	Boston Red Sox	Third Baseman-Outfielder
6	124	Bob Boone	Philadelphia Phillies	Third Baseman
6	127	Jim Sundberg*	Oakland Athletics	Catcher
8	173	Rick Burleson*	Minnesota Twins	Shortstop
9	210	Bucky Dent*	St. Louis Cardinals	Third Baseman
11	258	Bill Madlock*	St. Louis Cardinals	Third Baseman
12	278	Bill North	Chicago Cubs	Outfielder
13	295	John Stearns*	Oakland Athletics	Catcher
14	312	Mike Easler	Houston Astros	Third Baseman
15	355	Jim Slaton	Seattle Pilots	Pitcher
16	373	Buddy Bell	Cleveland Indians	Second Baseman
18	430	Doug DeCinces*	San Diego Padres	Third Baseman
20	471	Dick Ruthven*	Baltimore Orioles	Pitcher
25	579	Mark Marquess	Chicago White Sox	First Baseman
29	677	Ken Griffey Sr.	Cincinnati Reds	Outfielder
31	730	Ken Reitz	St. Louis Cardinals	Shortstop
35	797	Tippy Martinez*	Washington Senators	Pitcher-Outfielder
39	873	Terry Humphrey	Montreal Expos	Catcher-First Baseman
40	882	Dave Winfield*	Baltimore Orioles	Pitcher-Outfielder
75	1026	Al Cowens	Kansas City Royals	Outfielder

* Did not sign

== Notes ==
Preceded by Tim Foli	1st Overall Picks; Jeff Burroughs	Succeeded by Mike Ivie
