= List of Big Ten Conference baseball champions =

Baseball champions of collegiate athletics conference

The Big Ten Conference has been playing baseball since 1896. From 1896 to 1980 the conference champion was determined by the team or teams with the best record. In 1981 the Big Ten Conference baseball tournament was established to decide its champion. The conference also split the 10 schools into two divisions: East and West. In 1988 the conference went back to a single division but still used the tournament to determine the champion. In 1993 the conference returned to using the regular season to name its champion while the team that wins the tournament receives the automatic bid to the NCAA Division I Baseball Championship.

== Champions ==
This list is of the official Big Ten champions based on standings, the system used from 1896 to 1980 and from 1993 to the present. (From 1981 to 1992, the champion was determined by the conference tournament.)

Year	Champion	National Championship	Notes
1896	Chicago		Only Chicago , Illinois , Michigan , and Wisconsin compete.
1897	Chicago		
1898	Chicago		First season Northwestern competed.
1899	Michigan		
1900	Illinois		
1901	Michigan		
1902	Wisconsin		
1903	Illinois		
1904	Illinois		
1905	Michigan		
1906	Illinois		First season Indiana , Iowa , Minnesota , and Purdue competed.
1907	Illinois		
1908	Illinois		
1909	Purdue		
1910	Illinois		
1911	Illinois		
1912	Wisconsin		
1913	Chicago		First season Ohio State competed.
1914	Illinois		
1915	Illinois		
1916	Illinois		
1917	Ohio State		
1918	Michigan		
1919	Michigan		
1920	Michigan		
1921	Illinois		
1922	Illinois		
1923	Michigan		
1924	Michigan; Ohio State		
1925	Indiana		
1926	Michigan		
1927	Illinois; Iowa		
1928	Michigan		
1929	Michigan		
1930	Wisconsin		
1931	Illinois		
1932	Indiana		
1933	Minnesota		
1934	Illinois		
1935	Minnesota		
1936	Michigan		
1937	Illinois		
1938	Indiana; Iowa		
1939	Iowa		
1940	Illinois; Northwestern		
1941	Michigan		
1942	Iowa; Michigan		
1943	Ohio State		
1944	Michigan		
1945	Michigan		
1946	Wisconsin		Last season Chicago competed.
1947	Illinois		Tie games began counting as 1/2 a win and 1/2 a loss.
1948	Illinois; Michigan		
1949	Indiana; Iowa; Michigan		
1950	Michigan; Wisconsin		
1951	Ohio State		First season Michigan State competed.
1952	Illinois; Michigan		
1953	Illinois; Michigan	Michigan	
1954	Michigan State		
1955	Ohio State		
1956	Minnesota	Minnesota	
1957	Northwestern		
1958	Minnesota		
1959	Minnesota		
1960	Minnesota	Minnesota	
1961	Michigan		
1962	Illinois	Michigan	
1963	Illinois		
1964	Minnesota	Minnesota	
1965	Ohio State		
1966	Ohio State	Ohio State	
1967	Ohio State		
1968	Minnesota		
1969	Minnesota		
1970	Minnesota		
1971	Michigan State		
1972	Iowa		
1973	Minnesota		
1974	Minnesota; Iowa		
1975	Michigan		
1976	Michigan		
1977	Minnesota		
1978	Michigan		
1979	Michigan State		
1980	Michigan		
1981	Michigan		Big Ten tournament winner declared conference champion.
1982	Minnesota		
1983	Michigan		
1984	Michigan		
1985	Minnesota		
1986	Michigan		
1987	Michigan		
1988	Minnesota		
1989	Illinois		
1990	Illinois		
1991	Ohio State		Last season Wisconsin competed.
1992	Minnesota		First season Penn State competed.
1993	Ohio State		Regular season winner declared conference champion. Big Ten tournament used to determine NCAA automatic qualifier only.
1994	Ohio State		
1995	Ohio State		
1996	Penn State		
1997	Michigan		
1998	Illinois		
1999	Ohio State		
2000	Minnesota		
2001	Ohio State		
2002	Minnesota		
2003	Minnesota		
2004	Minnesota		
2005	Illinois		
2006	Michigan		
2007	Michigan		
2008	Michigan		
2009	Ohio State		
2010	Minnesota		
2011	Michigan State; Illinois		
2012	Purdue		First season Nebraska competed.
2013	Indiana		
2014	Indiana		
2015	Illinois		First season Maryland and Rutgers competed.
2016	Minnesota		
2017	Nebraska		
2018	Minnesota		
2019	Indiana		
2020	Season cancelled due to the coronavirus pandemic		
2021	Nebraska		
2022	Maryland		
2023	Maryland		
2024	Illinois		
2025	Oregon; UCLA		Oregon , UCLA , USC , and Washington will begin league play.
2026	UCLA		

== Championships by school ==
School	Big Ten Championships	Years
Michigan	35	**1899**, **1901**, **1905**, **1918**, **1919**, **1920**, **1923**, 1924, **1926**, **1928**, **1929**, **1936**, **1941**, 1942, **1944**, **1945**, 1948, 1949, 1950, 1952, 1953, **1961**, **1975**, **1976**, **1978**, **1980**, **1981**, **1983**, **1984**, **1986**, **1987**, **1997**, **2006**, **2007**, **2008**
Illinois	31	**1900**, **1903**, **1904**, **1906**, **1907**, **1908**, **1910**, **1911**, **1914**, **1915**, **1916**, **1921**, **1922**, 1927, **1931**, **1934**, **1937**, 1940, **1947**, 1948, 1952, 1953, **1962**, **1963**, **1989**, **1990**, **1998**, **2005**, 2011, **2015**, **2024**
Minnesota	24	**1933**, **1935**, **1956**, **1958**, **1959**, **1960**, **1964**, **1968**, **1969**, **1970**, **1973**, 1974, **1977**, **1982**, **1985**, **1988**, **1992**, **2000**, **2002**, **2003**, **2004**, **2010**, **2016**, **2018**
Ohio State	15	**1917**, 1924, **1943**, **1951**, **1955**, **1965**, **1966**, **1967**, **1991**, **1993**, **1994**, **1995**, **1999**, **2001**, **2009**
Iowa	7	1927, 1938, **1939**, 1942, 1949, **1972**, 1974
Indiana	7	**1925**, **1932**, 1938, 1949, **2013**, **2014**, **2019**
Wisconsin	5	**1902**, **1912**, **1930**, **1946**, 1950
Chicago	4	**1896**, **1897**, **1898**, **1913**
Michigan State	4	**1954**, **1971**, **1979**, 2011
Maryland	2	**2022, 2023**
Nebraska	2	**2017, 2021**
Northwestern	2	1940, **1957**
Purdue	2	**1909**, **2012**
UCLA	2	2025, **2026**
Oregon	1	2025
Penn State	1	**1996**
Rutgers	0	

Italics indicates a team no longer competing in baseball in the Big Ten.

Bold indicates an outright Big Ten championship.

== See also ==
- List of Big Ten Conference softball champions
