= A. C. Burcky =

American athletics coach (1896–1989)

Biographical details
- Born: April 18, 1896; Tiskilwa, Illinois, U.S.
- Died: December 7, 1989 (aged 93); Bluffton, Ohio, U.S.
- Education: Bluffton College (1922)

Playing career

Baseball
- 1918–1921: Bluffton
- Position: Pitcher

Coaching career (HC unless noted)

Football
- 1923: Bluffton (assistant)
- 1924–1950: Bluffton

Men's basketball
- 1922–1946: Bluffton

Baseball
- 1923–1966: Bluffton

Tennis
- 1922–c. 1940s: Bluffton

Track and field
- 1922–c. 1949: Bluffton

Women's basketball
- 1922–c. 1940s: Bluffton

Administrative career (AD unless noted)
- 1922–1963: Bluffton

Head coaching record
- Overall: 41–110–16 (football); 143–216 (men's basketball); 145–190–4 (baseball)

Accomplishments and honors

Championships
- Football; 1 NWOL (1932); Baseball; 1 NWOL (1927); 1 MOL (1962)

Andrew C. "Zig" Burcky (April 18, 1896 – December 7, 1989) was an American college sports coach. He was the head football coach for Bluffton College—now known as Bluffton University—from 1924 to 1950. He was also the men's basketball head coach from 1922 to 1946, the baseball head coach from 1923 to 1966, the head tennis coach from 1922 into the 1940s, the head track and field coach from 1922 into the 1940s, and the women's basketball team from 1922 into the 1940s.

== Playing career ==
Burcky graduated from Bluffton College—now known as Bluffton University—in 1922. He played college baseball as a pitcher for Bluffton. Following his graduation he took over the entirety of the athletics program.

== Coaching career ==
From 1924 to 1950, Burcky was the head football coach for Bluffton. In 25 seasons with the team he led them to a 41–110–16 record and one Northwest Ohio League (NWOL) championship in 1932.

From 1922 to 1946, Burcky was the head men's basketball coach for Bluffton. In 24 seasons with the team he led them to an unofficial 143–216 record.

From 1923 to 1966, Burcky was the head baseball coach for Bluffton. In 41 seasons with the team he led them to an unofficial 145–190–4 record and one NWOL championship in 1927 and one Mid-Ohio League (MOL) championship in 1962.

From 1922 into the late 1940s, Burcky served as the head tennis coach, head track and field coach, and head women's basketball coach for Bluffton.

== Personal life and military career ==
From 1922 to 1963, Burcky served as the athletic director for Bluffton. Throughout his career he served as the trainer and equipment manager.

Prior to 1918, Burcky served in the military during World War I.

== Honors and death ==
In 1962, Burcky was inducted into the National Association of Intercollegiate Athletics (NAIA) Baseball Hall of Fame. In 1974, he was inducted into Bluffton's inaugural hall of fame class.

Burcky died on December 7, 1989, in Bluffton, Ohio.

== Head coaching record ==
=== Football ===
Year	Team	Overall	Conference	Standing	Bowl/playoffs
Bluffton Beavers (Northwest Ohio League) (1924–1932)
1924	Bluffton	0–4–1			
1925	Bluffton	1–3	1–2	4th	
1926	Bluffton	3–3	2–2	3rd	
1927	Bluffton	4–2	2–2	T–3rd	
1928	Bluffton	3–2–1	2–2	3rd	
1929	Bluffton	0–6–1	0–4	5th	
1930	Bluffton	0–7	0–4	5th	
1931	Bluffton	2–2–3	1–0–2	2nd	
1932	Bluffton	3–2–2	2–0–1	1st	
Bluffton Beavers (Independent) (1933–1948)
1933	Bluffton	2–4–1			
1934	Bluffton	3–4			
1935	Bluffton	1–4–2			
1936	Bluffton	4–1–2			
1937	Bluffton	1–6–1			
1938	Bluffton	3–4			
1939	Bluffton	2–6			
1940	Bluffton	1–7			
1941	Bluffton	1–5–1			
1942	Bluffton	0–7			
1943	No team—World War II				
1944	No team—World War II				
1945	Bluffton	0–2			
1946	Bluffton	1–5			
1947	Bluffton	0–6–1			
1948	Bluffton	2–6			
Bluffton Beavers (Mid-Ohio League) (1949–1950)
1949	Bluffton	0–8	0–4	5th	
1950	Bluffton	4–4	2–3	4th	
Bluffton:		41–110–16	12–23–3		
Total:		41–110–16			
National championship Conference title Conference division title or championship game berth

=== Men's basketball ===
Record table
Season	Team	Overall	Conference	Standing	Postseason
Bluffton Beavers (Northwest Ohio League) (1922–1946)
1922–23	Bluffton	7–11			
1923–24	Bluffton	9–5			
1924–25	Bluffton	5–9			
1925–26	Bluffton	6–8			
1926–27	Bluffton	10–6			
1927–28	Bluffton	9–7			
1928–29	Bluffton	1–14			
1929–30	Bluffton	8–7			
1930–31	Bluffton	7–6			
1931–32	Bluffton	7–10			
1932–33	Bluffton	8–9			
1933–34	Bluffton	4–10			
1934–35	Bluffton	11–5			
1935–36	Bluffton	12–4			
1936–37	Bluffton	6–10			
1937–38	Bluffton	3–13			
1938–39	Bluffton	5–11			
1939–40	Bluffton	3–14			
1940–41	Bluffton	7–10			
1941–42	Bluffton	2–16			
1942–43	Bluffton	0–8			
1943–44	Bluffton	4–3			
1944–45	No team—World War II				
1945–46	Bluffton	1–9			
1946–47	Bluffton	6–11			
Bluffton:		143–216			
Total:		143–216			

=== Baseball ===
Record table
Season	Team	Overall	Conference	Standing	Postseason
Bluffton Beavers (Northwest Ohio League) (1923–1948)
1923	Bluffton	1–3			
1924	Bluffton	0–3			
1925	Bluffton	2–5			
1926	Bluffton	3–5			
1927	Bluffton	8–1		1st	
1928	Bluffton	2–4			
1929	Bluffton	4–4			
1930	Bluffton	3–7			
1931	Bluffton	6–6		2nd	
1932	Bluffton	2–6			
1933	Bluffton	3–8			
1934	Bluffton	6–4			
1935	Bluffton	0–4			
1936	Bluffton	4–5			
1937	Bluffton	N/A			
1938	Bluffton	0–2			
1939	Bluffton	0–3			
1940	Bluffton	N/A			
1942	Bluffton	N/A			
1942	Bluffton	N/A			
1943	No team—World War II				
1944	No team—World War II				
1945	No team—World War II				
1946	No team—World War II				
1947	Bluffton	0–1			
1948	Bluffton	4–12			
Bluffton Beavers (Mid-Ohio League) (1949–1966)
1949	Bluffton	N/A			
1950	Bluffton	N/A			
1951	Bluffton	6–5			
1952	Bluffton	8–3			
1953	Bluffton	2–8			
1954	Bluffton	7–5–1			
1955	Bluffton	7–7			
1956	Bluffton	6–9			
1957	Bluffton	6–6–1			
1958	Bluffton	7–7			
1959	Bluffton	6–6			
1960	Bluffton	3–8–1			
1961	Bluffton	4–6			
1962	Bluffton	10–4		1st	
1963	Bluffton	4–12			
1964	Bluffton	8–6–1			
1965	Bluffton	6–8			
1966	Bluffton	7–7			
Bluffton:		145–190–4			
Total:		145–190–4			
National champion Postseason invitational champion Conference regular season champion Conference regular season and conference tournament champion Division regular season champion Division regular season and conference tournament champion Conference tournament champion
