= D. V. Graves =

American sports coach (1886–1960)

- Graves, c. 1945

Biographical details
- Born: November 27, 1886; Lincoln County, Missouri, U.S.
- Died: January 16, 1960 (aged 73); Seattle, Washington, U.S.

Playing career

Football
- 1906–1908: Missouri
- 1909: Idaho

Coaching career (HC unless noted)

Football
- 1911–1914: Alabama
- 1915–1917: Texas A&M (assistant)
- 1918: Texas A&M
- 1919: Texas A&M (assistant)
- 1920–1921: Montana State
- 1922–1938: Washington (assistant)
- 1942–1945: Washington (assistant)

Basketball
- 1912–1915: Alabama
- 1915–1916: Texas A&M
- 1920–1922: Montana State
- 1922–1946: Washington (assistant)

Baseball
- 1912–1915: Alabama
- 1912: La Junta Railroaders
- 1916–1919: Texas A&M
- 1923–1946: Washington

Administrative career (AD unless noted)
- 1911–1915: Alabama
- 1920–1922: Montana State
- 1946–1960: Washington (assistant AD)

Head coaching record
- Overall: 32–18–4 (college football); 50–27 (college basketball); 348–185–8 (college baseball)

Accomplishments and honors

Awards
- University of Washington Husky Hall of Fame

Dorsett Vandeventer "Tubby" Graves (November 27, 1886 – January 16, 1960) was an American college head coach in baseball, football, and basketball. He played college football and baseball.

Graves was primarily a baseball coach, and led three college programs for a total of 32 seasons. He began at the University of Alabama for four seasons (1912–1915), spent another four at Texas A&M University (1916–1919), and finished with 24 seasons the University of Washington (1923–1946).

In football, he was a college head coach for seven seasons: at Alabama (1911–1914), Texas A&M (1918), and the Agricultural College of the State of Montana—now Montana State University (1920–1921), compiling a career record of 32–18–4. In basketball, he served as a head coach for six years: at Alabama (1912–1915), Texas A&M (1915–1916), and Montana Agricultural (1920–1922). At Washington, he was a longtime assistant coach in football and basketball, and later an assistant athletic director.

In the summer of 1912, Graves was the manager of the La Junta Railroaders, a minor league baseball team in La Junta, Colorado of the short-lived Rocky Mountain League.

== Early years ==
Born in Missouri, Graves was one of ten children of a doctor, and his two given names were surnames of two physicians. He played college football at Missouri from 1906 to 1908, and after his eligibility was used up in the Midwest, he moved to the Northwest and played at Idaho on the Palouse for a season in 1909. After college, Graves played baseball in the minor leagues.

== Coaching career ==
=== Baseball ===
Graves was the head coach at Alabama, Texas A&M, and Washington, where he led the Huskies in Seattle for 24 seasons (1923–1946). Graves had a long-standing amicable rivalry with Buck Bailey of Washington State, whom he coached in baseball and football at Texas A&M.

=== Football ===
After several years of playing baseball in the minors, he coached football at Alabama, Texas A&M, and what is now Montana State. From 1911 to 1914, he led the Alabama program to a 21–12–3 record. In his only season at Texas A&M in 1918, he compiled a 6–1 record. He then served as an assistant coach at Texas A&M in 1919 under head coach Dana X. Bible. At Montana Agricultural in Bozeman, he had a 5–5–1 record over two seasons. While head coach of the baseball team at Washington, Graves also served as an assistant coach in football to several coaches.

=== Basketball ===
Graves was a head basketball coach for six seasons, the first three at Alabama, where he was the program's first coach and compiled a record of 20–12 (.625) from 1912 to 1915. He later headed the Texas A&M program for a season and two at Montana Agricultural. At Washington, he was an assistant coach for 24 seasons under head coach Hec Edmundson. Graves had met Edmundson at Idaho when they were undergraduate athletes, and both were head coaches at Texas A&M in the spring of 1919, Edmundson in track and Graves in baseball.

== After coaching ==
After stepping down as baseball coach at Washington, Graves became an assistant athletic director at the university, where he remained until his death. He was also involved with horse racing in the state as a race steward at Longacres in Renton and Playfair Race Course in Spokane.

== Death ==
While visiting Pullman in the spring of 1959, Graves fell and broke a hip. That December, he was hospitalized in Seattle for treatment of a liver ailment and died several weeks later in January 1960 at age 73. He is buried at Calvary Cemetery in Seattle, about a mile (1.6 km) northeast of the university.

The UW athletic office building (1964) and the two former baseball fields (through 1997) were named for Graves; he was posthumously inducted into the Big W Club, the UW athletics hall of fame, in 1980.

== Head coaching record ==
=== College football ===
Year	Team	Overall	Conference	Standing	Bowl/playoffs
Alabama Crimson Tide (Southern Intercollegiate Athletic Association) (1911–1914)
1911	Alabama	5–2–2	2–2–2		
1912	Alabama	5–3–1	3–3–1		
1913	Alabama	6–3	4–3		
1914	Alabama	5–4	4–3		
Alabama:		21–12–3	13–11–3		
Texas A&M Aggies (Southwest Conference) (1918)
1918	Texas A&M	6–1	1–1	T–3rd	
Texas A&M:		6–1	1–1		
Montana Agricultural Bobcats (Rocky Mountain Conference) (1920–1921)
1920	Montana State	3–1–1			
1921	Montana State	2–4			
Montana Agricultural:		5–5–1			
Total:		32–18–4			

=== College baseball ===
Record table
Season	Team	Overall	Conference	Standing	Postseason
Alabama Crimson Tide (Southern Intercollegiate Athletic Association) (1912–1915)
1912	Alabama	16–6			
1913	Alabama	22–7			
1914	Alabama	11–13			
1915	Alabama	17–14–1			
Alabama:		66–30–1 (.686)			
Texas A&M Aggies (Southwest Conference) (1916–1919)
1916	Texas A&M	17–8	8–7	3rd	
1917	Texas A&M	9–5–3	2–4	3rd	
1918	Texas A&M	14–5	4–4	2nd	
1919	Texas A&M	8–6	4–4	2nd	
Texas A&M:		48–24–3 (.660)	18–19 (.486)		
Washington Huskies (Pacific Coast Conference) (1923–1946)
1923	Washington	16–4	8–1	1st (North)	
1924	Washington	15–6–1	10–5–1	2nd	
1925	Washington	11–2	8–2	1st (North)	
1926	Washington	8–3	8–3	1st (North)	
1927	Washington	7–7	5–4	4th (North)	
1928	Washington	6–4	4–4	4th (North)	
1929	Washington	12–7	9–6	1st (North)	
1930	Washington	10–3	10–3	1st (North)	
1931	Washington	13–3	13–3	1st (North)	
1932	Washington	15–4	13–4	1st (North)	
1933	Washington	7–3	3–3	T–2nd (North)	
1934	Washington	8–8	6–8	4th (North)	
1935	Washington	13–13–1	10–6	2nd (North)	
1936	Washington	15–10	9–7	T–2nd (North)	
1937	Washington	7–7	7–7	3rd (North)	
1938	Washington	7–15–1	4–12	5th (North)	
1939	Washington	9–12	6–10	4th (North)	
1940	Washington	7–13	4–11	5th (North)	
1941	Washington	10–6	10–6	2nd (North)	
1942	Washington	8–8	8–8	2nd (North)	
1943	Washington	10–7	8–7	3rd (North)	
1944	Washington	5–5–1	Independent		
1945	Washington	4–9	2–2	2nd (North)	
1946	Washington	11–7	8–8	3rd (North)	
Washington:		234–131–4 (.637)			
Total:		348–185–8 (.651)			
National champion Postseason invitational champion Conference regular season champion Conference regular season and conference tournament champion Division regular season champion Division regular season and conference tournament champion Conference tournament champion
