= Dudy Noble =

American multi-sport athlete

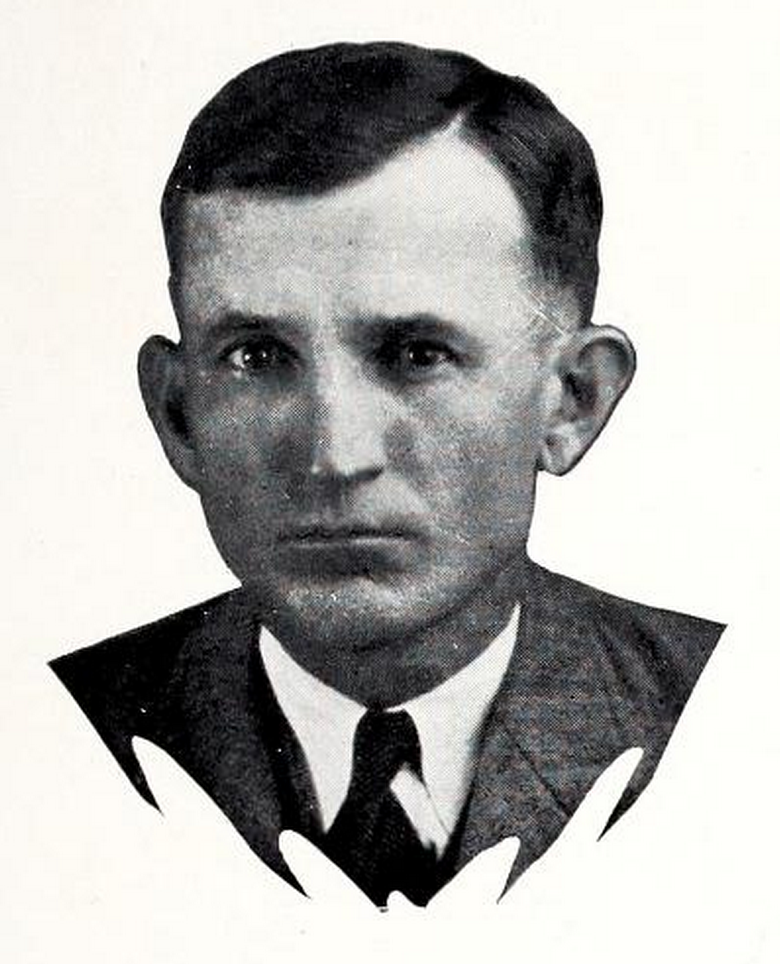
- Noble pictured in Reveille 1934, Mississippi State yearbook

Biographical details
- Born: May 6, 1893; Learned, Mississippi, U.S.
- Died: February 2, 1963 (aged 69); Vicksburg, Mississippi, U.S.

Playing career
- 1911–1915: Mississippi A&M

Coaching career (HC unless noted)

Football
- 1916: Mississippi College
- 1917–1918: Ole Miss
- 1919–1921: Mississippi A&M (assistant)
- 1922: Mississippi A&M
- 1923–1929: Mississippi A&M (assistant)

Basketball
- 1918–1919: Ole Miss

Baseball
- 1918–1919: Ole Miss
- 1920–1943: Mississippi A&M/State
- 1946–1947: Mississippi State

Administrative career (AD unless noted)
- 1930–1934: Mississippi State
- 1937–1959: Mississippi State

Head coaching record
- Overall: 11–14–3 (football); 0–3 (basketball); 277–205–9 (baseball)

Clark Randolph "Dudy" Noble (May 6, 1893 – February 2, 1963) was an American football, basketball, and baseball player, track athlete, coach, and college athletics administrator.

== College ==
Born in Learned, Mississippi, Noble attended Mississippi State University (then known as Mississippi A&M College) in Starkville, Mississippi. During his college days he earned 14 varsity letters in four sports—football, basketball, baseball and track. He graduated in 1917.

== Coaching and administrative career ==
After his college playing days were over, Noble went on to coach basketball, football, and most notably baseball at the college level for three different schools in his home state; Mississippi College, The University of Mississippi, and his alma mater Mississippi A&M.

=== Mississippi College ===
His first coaching job was as the head football coach at Mississippi College in 1916. While there he earned his second coaching victory when he led the Choctaws to a 13–6 upset over Mississippi A&M in a game played in Aberdeen, Mississippi. The Choctaws finished the season with a record of 4–3.

=== Ole Miss ===
In 1917 Noble became the head football coach at the University of Mississippi (Ole Miss), a position he held for two seasons. During his two years as the Rebels' head coach he compiled a record of 2–7–1 and went 0–3 against his alma mater, Mississippi A&M. He holds the distinction of having been the only head coach to lose two Egg Bowls in one season (1918). For the 1918–19 season he served as the head basketball coach at Ole Miss going 0–3. He had his most success in Oxford as the baseball coach compiling an overall record of 10–4 in the 1918 and 1919 seasons.

=== Mississippi State ===
Starting in 1920 Noble took over as skipper of the Mississippi State baseball team, a position that he held for 26 seasons until 1947 (MSU had no baseball team in 1944 and 1945). As head baseball coach he compiled a record 267–201–9 and won three Southern Intercollegiate Athletic Association championships. During his time as head baseball coach he awarded Dave "Boo" Ferris the first full baseball scholarship in Mississippi history. Noble also served one season as the Bulldogs' head football coach going 3–4–2 in 1922, including a victory over his former squad from Ole Miss.

From 1938 to 1959, Noble was also the athletic director at Mississippi State. During his tenure as athletic director he made several notable hires. Among those were football coaches Murray Warmath, Darrell Royal, and Allyn McKeen. McKeen left as MSU's all-time winningest head coach and is the only MSU coach elected to the College Football Hall of Fame. He hired basketball coach Babe McCarthy who won three SEC championships and defied state authorities to take MSU to its first NCAA basketball tournament in 1963. In 1953, he hired Jack Cristil who would go on to be the "Voice of the Bulldogs" for 58 years.

== Death and honors ==
Noble died on February 2, 1963, at a hospital in Vicksburg, Mississippi; he was 69 years old.

The Mississippi State baseball field was named Dudy Noble Field in his honor in 1949. He became a member of the Helms Baseball Hall of Fame in 1954, he was inducted into the Mississippi Sports Hall of Fame in 1961 and the American Baseball Coaches Association Hall of Fame in 1967.

Speaking on his time spent in Oxford Dudy Noble once told a Tennessee sports writer: “I already know what hell is like. I once coached at Ole Miss.” Noble once owned a bird dog, a lazy mutt that refused to hunt. Dudy Noble named him “Mr. Ole Miss.”

== Head coaching record ==
=== Football ===
Year	Team	Overall	Conference	Standing	Bowl/playoffs
Mississippi College Choctaws (Independent) (1916)
1916	Mississippi College	6–3			
Mississippi College:		6–3			
Ole Miss Rebels (Southern Intercollegiate Athletic Association) (1917–1918)
1917	Ole Miss	1–4–1	1–4	14th	
1918	Ole Miss	1–3	0–2	T–9th	
Ole Miss:		2–7–1	1–6		
Mississippi A&M Bulldogs (Southern Conference) (1922)
1922	Mississippi A&M	3–4–2	2–3	11th	
Mississippi A&M:		3–4–2	2–3		
Total:		11–14–3			

=== Basketball ===
Record table
Season	Team	Overall	Conference	Standing	Postseason
Ole Miss Rebels (Southern Intercollegiate Athletic Association) (1918–1919)
1918–19	Ole Miss	0–3			
Ole Miss:		0–3			
Total:		0–3			

=== Baseball ===
Record table
Season	Team	Overall	Conference	Standing	Postseason
Ole Miss Rebels (Southern Intercollegiate Athletic Association) (1918–1919)
1918	Ole Miss	9–1			
1919	Ole Miss	1–3			
Ole Miss:		10–4			
Mississippi A&M Bulldogs (Southern Intercollegiate Athletic Association) (1920–1922)
1920	Mississippi A&M	8–8	6–6		
1921	Mississippi A&M	13–8	6–6	1st	
1922	Mississippi A&M	16–6–3	7–1–1	1st	
Mississippi A&M Bulldogs (Southern Conference) (1923–1932)
1923	Mississippi A&M	14–9	11–7		
1924	Mississippi A&M	17–7	12–3	1st	
1925	Mississippi A&M	19–7	9–5		
1926	Mississippi A&M	14–9	11–7		
1927	Mississippi A&M	13–8–1	9–7		
1928	Mississippi A&M	12–8	7–6		
1929	Mississippi A&M	9–6–3	3–5		
1930	Mississippi A&M	12–12	6–7		
1931	Mississippi A&M	12–9	8–5		
1932	Mississippi A&M	8–10	6–8		
Mississippi State Bulldogs (Southeastern Conference) (1933–1947)
1933	Mississippi State	10–5	5–3	2nd	
1934	Mississippi State	11–5	8–4	2nd	
1935	Mississippi State	8–3	8–3	2nd	
1936	Mississippi State	8–5–1	6–4	3rd	
1937	Mississippi State	12–3	8–3	3rd	
1938	Mississippi State	5–7	3–7	10th	
1939	Mississippi State	7–10	3–10	11th	
1940	Mississippi State	5–9	4–7	7th	
1941	Mississippi State	8–9	7–8	7th	
1942	Mississippi State	8–6–1	6–7	6th	
1943	Mississippi State	3–9	3–9	T–7th	
1944	No team				
1945	No team				
1946	Mississippi State	3–12	2–9	6th	
1947	Mississippi State	8–8	7–8	8th	
Mississippi State:		267–201–9	70–82		
Total:		277–205–9			
National champion Postseason invitational champion Conference regular season champion Conference regular season and conference tournament champion Division regular season champion Division regular season and conference tournament champion Conference tournament champion
