= Jack Coombs =

American baseball player (1882–1957)

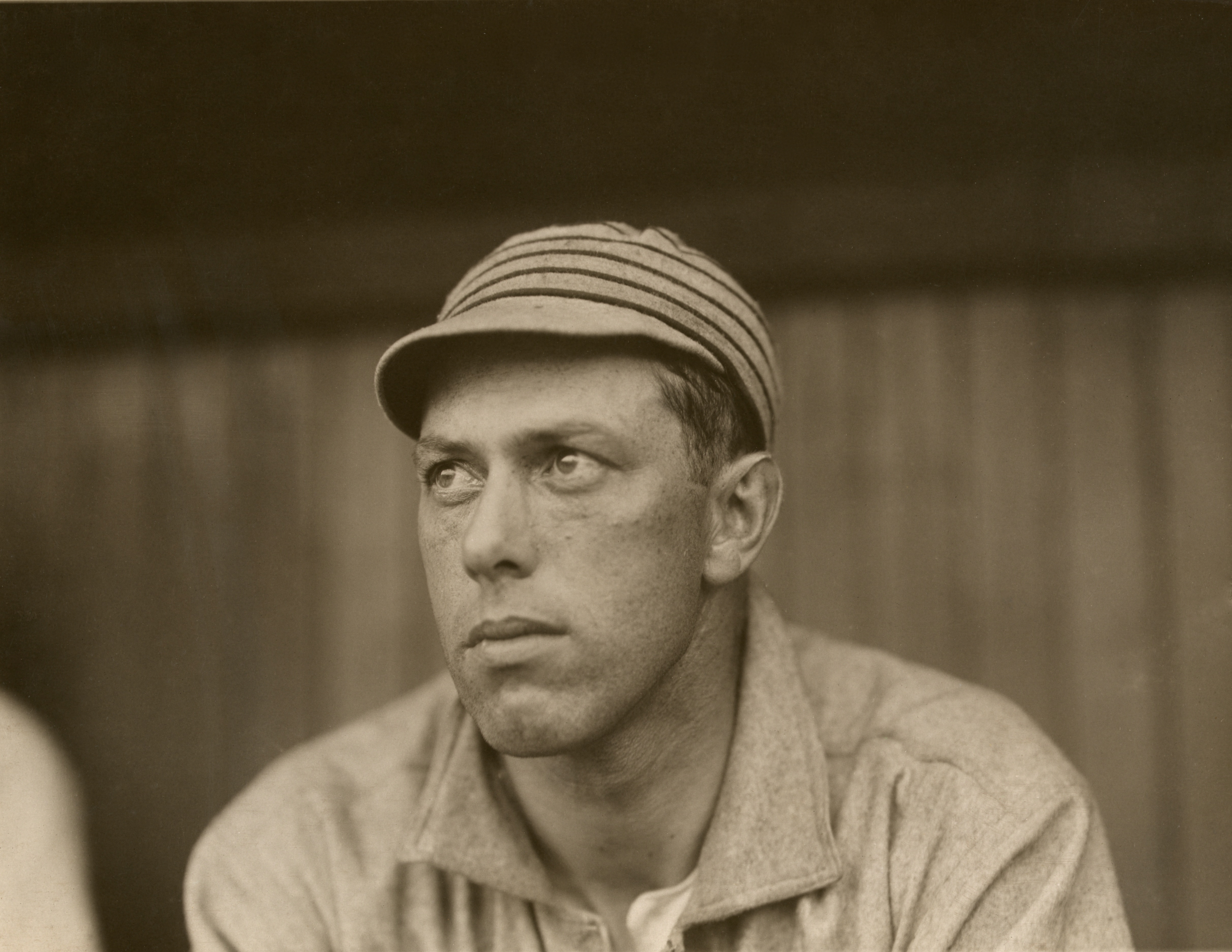
- Coombs in 1911
- Pitcher
- Born: November 18, 1882; Le Grand, Iowa, U.S.
- Died: April 15, 1957 (aged 74); Palestine, Texas, U.S.
- Batted: Both Threw: Right

MLB debut
- July 5, 1906, for the Philadelphia Athletics

Last MLB appearance
- July 18, 1920, for the Detroit Tigers

MLB statistics
- Win–loss record: 158–110
- Earned run average: 2.78
- Strikeouts: 1,052
- Stats at Baseball Reference

Teams
- As player: Philadelphia Athletics (1906–1914); Brooklyn Robins (1915–1918); Detroit Tigers (1920); As manager: Philadelphia Phillies (1919)

Career highlights and awards
- 3× World Series champion (1910, 1911, 1913); 2× AL wins leader (1910, 1911); Philadelphia Baseball Wall of Fame

John Wesley Coombs (November 18, 1882 – April 15, 1957), nicknamed "Colby Jack" after his alma mater, was an American professional baseball player. He played in Major League Baseball as a pitcher for the Philadelphia Athletics (1906–14), Brooklyn Robins (1915–18), and Detroit Tigers (1920). In 1910, Coombs won 31 games during the regular season and three games in the World Series to lead the Athletics to the championship. A two-way player, he also occasionally played as an outfielder.

== Early life ==
Born in LeGrand, Iowa, Coombs moved to Kennebunk, Maine with his family at the age of four. He played baseball in high school in Freeport, Maine, and in 1901–02 for Coburn Classical prep school in Waterville. Coombs was a 1906 graduate of Colby College in Waterville, where he was a chemistry major and a member of Delta Upsilon. He also participated in football, track, and tennis. Colby's baseball field is named for him.

== Baseball career ==
Three weeks after graduating, Coombs pitched in his first major league game for the Philadelphia Athletics, a seven-hit shutout, defeating the Washington Senators 3–0. He finished 1906 with a 10–10 record and 2.50 earned run average. In 1906, he pitched the longest complete game in the American League, 24 innings against Boston, winning 4–1 with 18 strikeouts. The following year, Coombs went 6–9 with a 3.12 ERA. In 1908 and 1909, his record was only 19–16 despite his ERA being 2.00 and 2.32 those years.

Coombs' best season was 1910, which is still one of the best pitching seasons in MLB history. Besides his record of 31–9, he had an ERA of 1.30 and led the American League in wins (31), games played (45), and shutouts (13), which is still the single-season AL record. He won 18 of 19 starts that July and racked up 53 consecutive scoreless innings, which stood as the major league record until Walter Johnson broke it three years later. Don Drysdale and Orel Hershiser later surpassed Johnson's mark. Coombs became one of only 13 pitchers to win 30 games in a season since 1900. He then won three games in the 1910 World Series, in which the Athletics defeated the Chicago Cubs.

In 1911, Coombs led the AL in wins again with 28, even though his ERA went up to 3.53. He won one game in the 1911 World Series, as the Athletics repeated as champions. The following year, he won 21 games.

Coombs did not play much in 1913 and 1914. The Athletics released him, and he signed with the Brooklyn Robins, for whom he played from 1915 to 1918. In the 1916 World Series, he won a game, but the Robins lost the series.

In 1919, Coombs was the manager of the Philadelphia Phillies for 62 games, going 18–44 before being replaced by Gavvy Cravath. He returned to play one final year in 1920 for the Detroit Tigers before retiring. Coombs finished his MLB career with a 158–110 record, a 2.78 ERA, and 1,052 strikeouts.

Coombs was an adept hitting pitcher in his 14-year major league career, compiling a .235 batting average (261-for-1110) with 4 home runs, 123 runs scored, and 100 runs batted in. He played 62 games in the outfield during his career. In six World Series games, he hit .333 (8-for-24) with 4 RBI.

== Coaching ==
In 1912 , Coombs served as coach in a temporary capacity for the upstart Palestine Athletics in Palestine, Texas before leaving for San Antonio and spring training that year.

In 1917, Coombs helped coach the baseball team at the Rice Institute. He returned to the school that fall as an assistant football coach. Coombs helped train the 1918 Rice baseball team, but left before the season started to play in the majors, which left the Owls without a coach for the remainder of the season.

In 1921, Coombs became the head baseball coach at Williams College. He became a championship-winning coach at Duke University for nearly 30 years (1929–1952) who sent many players to the majors and reached the College World Series in his final season. Duke University's baseball field is named after him.

== Later life ==
Coombs resided in Palestine, Texas, where he owned a general store and had financial interest in two banks. He spent his retirement as a sports historian and writer. In 1938, he published Baseball – Individual Play and Team Strategy.

== Head coaching record ==
Record table
| Season | Team | Overall | Conference | Standing | Postseason |
|---|---|---|---|---|---|
Rice Owls (Southwest Conference) (1918)
| 1918 | Rice | 6–8 | 0–2 | | |
| Rice: | | 6–8 (.429) | 0–2 (.000) | | |
Duke Blue Devils (Southern Conference) (1929–1952)
| 1929 | Duke | 13–5 | | | |
| 1930 | Duke | 17–5 | | | State Champions |
| 1931 | Duke | 11–4 | | | State Champions |
| 1932 | Duke | 15–7 | | | |
| 1933 | Duke | 12–7 | | | |
| 1934 | Duke | 20–4 | | | |
| 1935 | Duke | 24–3 | | | |
| 1936 | Duke | 18–7 | | | |
| 1937 | Duke | 22–2 | | | State Champions |
| 1938 | Duke | 18–3 | | | State Champions |
| 1939 | Duke | 22–2 | | | State Champions |
| 1940 | Duke | 16–7 | | | |
| 1941 | Duke | 14–11 | | | |
| 1942 | Duke | 15–7 | | | |
| 1943 | Duke | 8–4 | | | |
| 1944 | Duke | 9–7 | | | |
| 1945 | Duke | 9–7 | | | |
| 1946 | Duke | 15–8 | | | State Champions |
| 1947 | Duke | 18–10 | 13–6 | 3rd | Big Four Champions, State Champions |
| 1948 | Duke | 15–12 | | | |
| 1949 | Duke | 12–17–1 | 9–13 | 11th | |
| 1950 | Duke | 11–18 | | unknown (southern) | |
| 1951 | Duke | 17–8 | | 2nd (southern) | Southern Conference Tournament Champions, Co-Big Four Champions |
| 1952 | Duke | 31–7 | 18–3 | 1st (southern) | College World Series (5th place) |
| Duke: | | 381–171–3 (.689) | | | |
| Total: | | 387–179–3 (.683) | | | |
National champion Postseason invitational champion Conference regular season champion Conference regular season and conference tournament champion Division regular season champion Division regular season and conference tournament champion Conference tournament champion

== Films ==
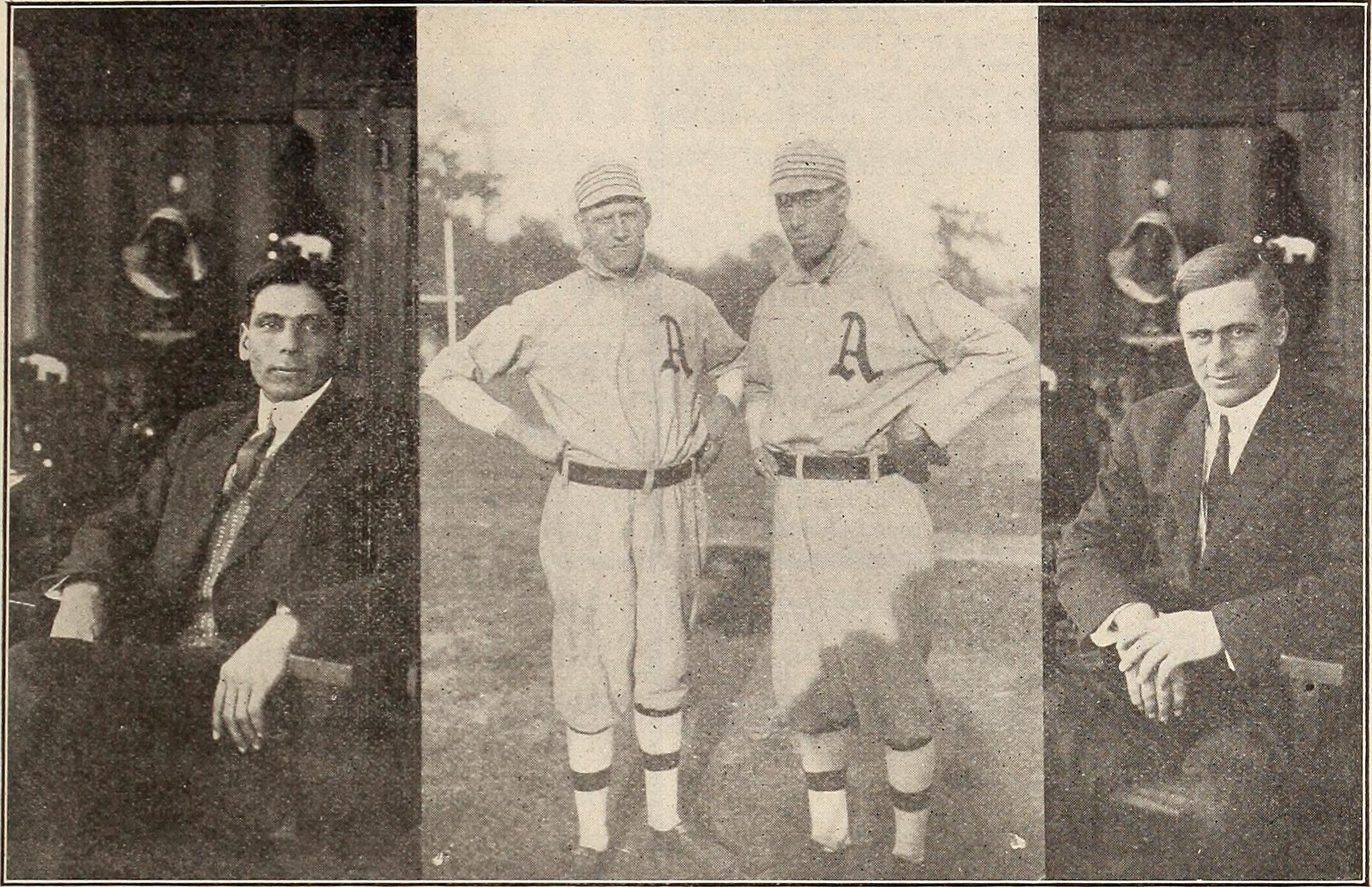
The four stars of the world champion Philadelphia Athletics — Chief Bender, Cy Morgan, Jack Coombs, and Rube Oldring — were featured in the Thanhouser Company film, The Baseball Bug (1911)

- World's Championship Series (1910) *docu. short
- The Baseball Bug (1911) *short
- Animated Weekly, No. 41 (1916) *docu. short
- World Series Games 1916, Boston vs. Brooklyn (1916) *documentary
- The Baseball Revue of 1917 (1917) *documentary

== See also ==
- List of Major League Baseball annual wins leaders
- List of Major League Baseball annual shutout leaders
- List of baseball players who went directly to Major League Baseball
- List of members of the North Carolina Sports Hall of Fame
- Philadelphia Baseball Wall of Fame
