= J. Orlean Christian =

Biographical details
- Born: May 10, 1898; Roland, Iowa, U.S.
- Died: October 21, 1979 (aged 81); Willimantic, Connecticut, U.S.

Coaching career (HC unless noted)

Football
- 1934–1949: Connecticut State / Connecticut

Basketball
- 1935–1936: Connecticut State (interim HC)

Baseball
- 1936–1961: Connecticut State / Connecticut

Administrative career (AD unless noted)
- 1950–1966: Connecticut
- 1966–1971: Yankee Conf. (commissioner)

Head coaching record
- Overall: 66–51–4 (football); 3–10 (basketball); 254–170–7 (baseball)

Joseph Orlean Christian (May 10, 1898 – October 21, 1979) was an American football, basketball, and baseball coach and college athletics administrator. He served as the head football coach at the University of Connecticut from 1934 to 1949 and as the head baseball coach there from 1936 to 1961. Christian was also the school's athletic director from 1950 to 1966 and filled in as interim head basketball coach during the 1935–36 season. He served as the first commissioner of the Yankee Conference, from 1966 to 1971. Christian died on October 21, 1979, at the age of 81 in a convalescent home in Willimantic, Connecticut. The University of Connecticut's home baseball field, J. O. Christian Field, is named in his honor. Christian's 66 wins as head football coach at Connecticut were the most in program history until Randy Edsall surpassed him in 2010.

== Head coaching record ==
=== Football ===
Year	Team	Overall	Conference	Standing	Bowl/playoffs
Connecticut State / Connecticut Huskies (New England Conference) (1934–1946)
1934	Connecticut State	1–7	0–1	4th	
1935	Connecticut State	2–4–1	0–1	T–3rd	
1936	Connecticut State	7–2	2–0	1st	
1937	Connecticut State	6–2–1	1–0	T–1st	
1938	Connecticut State	4–3	0–3	5th	
1939	Connecticut	5–3	1–1	T–2nd	
1940	Connecticut	4–4	1–2	T–3rd	
1941	Connecticut	2–6	0–2	5th	
1942	Connecticut	6–2	2–0	T–1st	
1943	No team—World War II				
1944	Connecticut	7–1	0–0	3rd	
1945	Connecticut	7–1	2–0	T–1st	
1946	Connecticut	4–3–1	2–0–1	T–1st	
Connecticut Huskies (Yankee Conference) (1947–1949)
1947	Connecticut	4–4	1–2	3rd	
1948	Connecticut	3–5	2–1	2nd	
1949	Connecticut	4–4–1	2–0–1	T–1st	
Connecticut:		66–51–4	16–13–2		
Total:		66–51–4			
National championship Conference title Conference division title or championship game berth

=== Basketball ===
Record table
Season	Team	Overall	Conference	Standing	Postseason
Connecticut State Huskies (New England Conference) (1935–1936)
1935–36	Connecticut State	3–10	0–3		
Connecticut State:		3–10 (.231)	0–3 (.000)		
Total:		3–10 (.231)			

=== Baseball ===
The following table depicts Christian's record as head baseball coach at Connecticut.

Record table
Season	Team	Overall	Conference	Standing	Postseason
Connecticut State / Connecticut Huskies (1936–1961)
1936	Connecticut State	7–5			
1937	Connecticut State	7–8			
1938	Connecticut State	8–6			
1939	Connecticut	7–7			
1940	Connecticut	8–8–1			
1941	Connecticut	4–10			
1942	Connecticut	4–8			
1943	Connecticut	8–6			
1944	Connecticut	4–4–1			
1945	Connecticut	6–2			
1946	Connecticut	6–10–1			
1947	Connecticut	12–5			
1948	Connecticut	13–2			
1949	Connecticut	14–5			
1950	Connecticut	7–8			
1951	Connecticut	9–9–1			
1952	Connecticut	9–5–1			
1953	Connecticut	9–6–1			
1954	Connecticut	9–9			
1955	Connecticut	11–6			
1956	Connecticut	9–8–2			
1957	Connecticut	14–10	5–5		College World Series
1958	Connecticut	11–5			NCAA tournament
1959	Connecticut	20–3	10–0	1st	College World Series
1960	Connecticut	13–3			NCAA tournament
1961	Connecticut	24–19–2			NCAA tournament
Connecticut:		257–171–7			
Total:		257–171–7			
