= William C. Kenyon =

American sports coach and player (1898–1951)

- Kenyon pictured in The Prism 1943, Maine yearbook

Biographical details
- Born: December 5, 1898; Manchester, New Hampshire, U.S.
- Died: May 6, 1951 (aged 52); Bangor, Maine, U.S.

Playing career

Football
- 1919–1922: Georgetown
- 1925: New York Giants

Baseball
- c. 1920: Georgetown
- Positions: End, fullback, tailback (football)

Coaching career (HC unless noted)

Football
- 1926–1941: Maine (assistant)
- 1942: Maine
- 1944–1945: Maine

Basketball
- ?–1935: Maine (freshmen)
- 1935–1942: Maine
- 1944–1945: Maine

Baseball
- 1926–1935: Maine (freshmen)
- 1936–1943: Maine
- 1945–1949: Maine

Head coaching record
- Overall: 4–11 (football); 33–51 (basketball); 67–111–2 (baseball)

William Curtis Kenyon (December 5, 1898 – May 6, 1951) was an American football and baseball player and coach of football, basketball, and baseball. He served as the head football coach at the University of Maine in 1942 and from 1944 to 1945, compiling a record of 4–11. Kenyon also the head coach of the basketball team at Maine from 1935 to 1943 and again in 1944–45, and the head coach of the baseball team at the school from 1936 to 1943 and again from 1945 to 1949. Kenyon played college football at Georgetown University from 1919 to 1922 and in the National Football League (NFL) with the New York Giants in 1925. He also played baseball at Georgetown and was inducted into the university's Athletic Hall of Fame in 1927. Kenyon died on May 6, 1951, at a hospital in Bangor, Maine.

== Head coaching record ==
=== Football ===
| Year | Team | Overall | Conference | Standing | Bowl/playoffs |
|---|---|---|---|---|---|
Maine Black Bears (Maine Intercollegiate Athletic Association / New England Conference) (1942)
| 1942 | Maine | 2–4 | 2–1 / 0–2 | / 5th | |
Maine Black Bears (New England Conference) (1944–1945)
| 1944 | Maine | 2–2 | 1–1 | T–1st | |
| 1945 | Maine | 0–5 | 0–3 | 3rd | |
| Maine: | | 4–11 | 2–1 (MIAA); 1–6 (New England) | | |
| Total: | | 4–11 | | | |

=== Baseball ===
Below is a table of Kenyon's yearly records as a collegiate head baseball coach.

Record table
| Season | Team | Overall | Conference | Standing | Postseason |
|---|---|---|---|---|---|
Maine Black Bears (1936)
| 1936 | Maine | 6–6 | | | |
Maine Black Bears (New England Conference) (1937–1943)
| 1937 | Maine | 9–5–1 | 3–3 | 2nd | |
| 1938 | Maine | 11–7 | 6–2 | 1st | |
| 1939 | Maine | 4–13 | 0–8 | 5th | |
| 1940 | Maine | 5–11 | 1–6 | 5th | |
| 1941 | Maine | 4–12 | 1–6 | 5th | |
| 1942 | Maine | 6–8 | 3–5 | T–3rd | |
| 1943 | Maine | 4–8 | 3–5 | 4th | |
Maine Black Bears (1945–1948)
| 1945 | Maine | 2–7 | | | |
| 1946 | Maine | 3–8 | | | |
| 1947 | Maine | 7–6 | | | |
| 1948 | Maine | 2–9–1 | | | |
Maine Black Bears (Yankee Conference) (1949)
| 1949 | Maine | 4–11 | 1–4 | 5th | |
| Maine: | | 67–111–2 | 18–39 | | |
| Total: | | 67–111–2 | | | |
National champion Postseason invitational champion Conference regular season champion Conference regular season and conference tournament champion Division regular season champion Division regular season and conference tournament champion Conference tournament champion

== See also ==
- List of college football head coaches with non-consecutive tenure
