= Red Laird =

American basketball and baseball coach (1902–1992)

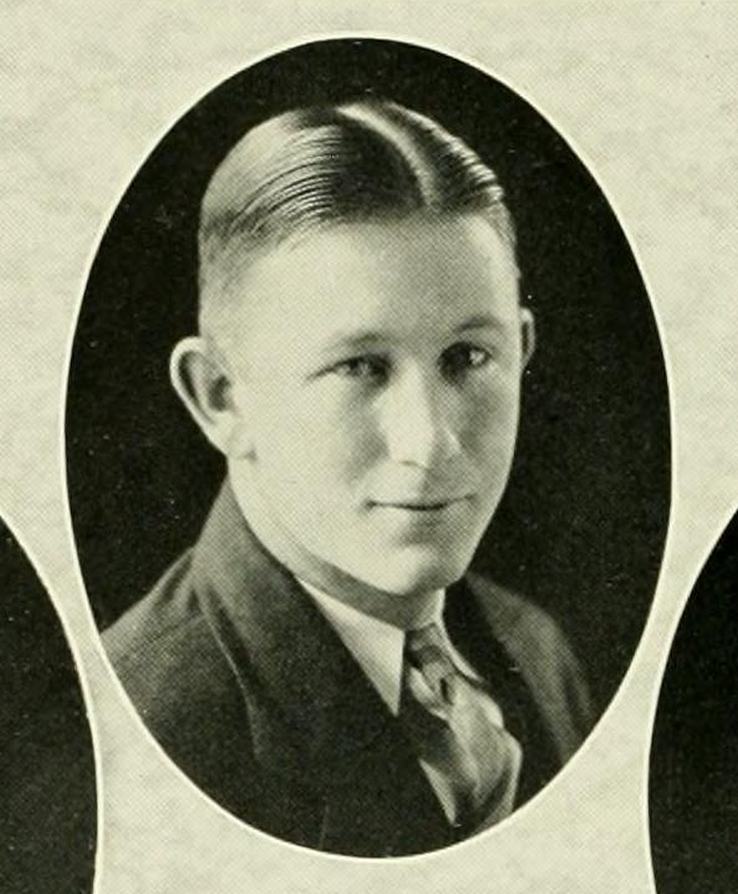
- Laird pictured as a senior in Quips and Cranks 1926, Davidson yearbook

Biographical details
- Born: December 16, 1902; Decatur, Georgia, U.S.
- Died: April 10, 1992 (aged 89); Blacksburg, Virginia, U.S.

Playing career

Football
- 1922–1925: Davidson

Basketball
- 1922–1926: Davidson

Baseball
- 1923–1926: Davidson

Coaching career (HC unless noted)

Basketball
- 1926–1928: Catawba
- 1931–1937: Davidson
- 1947–1955: Virginia Tech

Baseball
- 1927–1928: Catawba
- 1932–1939: Davidson
- 1940–1944: Virginia Tech
- 1948–1973: Virginia Tech

Head coaching record
- Overall: 134–221 (basketball); 409–392–5 (baseball)

Accomplishments and honors

Awards
- ABCA Hall of Fame (1971)

Greene Flake "Red" Laird (December 16, 1902 – April 10, 1992) was an American college basketball and baseball coach. He is best known for being Virginia Tech's head baseball coach for 30 seasons and compiling the second most wins in program history through the 2013 season (343). He was inducted into the American Baseball Coaches Association Hall of Fame in 1971, and into the Virginia Tech Sports Hall of Fame in 1983. The home dugout at Virginia Tech's home baseball venue, English Field, is named in his honor. Laird also coached the men's basketball and baseball teams at Virginia Tech, Catawba College, and Davidson College as well as the freshman football team at Davidson. Laird attended Davidson between 1922–23 and 1925–26. While there he earned 12 varsity letters – four each in football, basketball and baseball.

== Head coaching record ==
=== Basketball ===
Record table
Season	Team	Overall	Conference	Standing	Postseason
Catawba Indians (Little Six Conference) (1926–1928)
1926–27	Catawba	6–15	1–9		
1927–28	Catawba	8–12	4–8		
Catawba:		14–27	5–17		
Davidson Wildcats (Independent) (1931–1936)
1931–32	Davidson	3–12			
1932–33	Davidson	4–14			
1933–34	Davidson	6–13			
1934–35	Davidson	13–10			
1935–36	Davidson	4–15			
Davidson Wildcats (Southern Conference) (1936–1937)
1936–37	Davidson	13–10	5–8		
Davidson:		43–74	5–8		
Virginia Tech Hokies (Independent) (1947–1955)
1947–48	Virginia Tech	14–9			
1948–49	Virginia Tech	10–13			
1949–50	Virginia Tech	16–9			
1950–51	Virginia Tech	19–10			
1951–52	Virginia Tech	4–16			
1952–53	Virginia Tech	4–19			
1953–54	Virginia Tech	3–24			
1954–55	Virginia Tech	7–20			
Virginia Tech:		77–120			
Total:		134–221			

=== Baseball ===
Record table
Season	Team	Overall	Conference	Standing	Postseason
Catawba Indians (Independent) (1927–1928)
1927	Catawba	10–13–1			
1928	Catawba	5–9			
Catawba:		15–22–1			
Davidson Wildcats (Independent) (1932–1939)
1932	Davidson	6–11			
1933	Davidson	15–6			
1934	Davidson	3–13			
1935	Davidson	5–11			
1936	Davidson	2–18			
1937	Davidson	6–17			
1938	Davidson	8–8			
1939	Davidson	6–11			
Davidson:		51–95			
Virginia Tech Hokies (Independent) (1940–1943)
1940	Virginia Tech	7–5			
1941	Virginia Tech	6–10			
1942	Virginia Tech	10–5–1			
1943	Virginia Tech	4–8			
Virginia Tech Hokies (Southern Conference) (1948–1965)
1948	Virginia Tech	14–8–1	6–4	5th	
1949	Virginia Tech	10–11	5–7	10th	
1950	Virginia Tech	13–9	8–2	1st (North)	SoCon tournament (Note: The top two teams in each division were invited to the SoCon Tournament. The North Division was composed of 7 teams, while the South had 9.)
1951	Virginia Tech	8–11			
1952	Virginia Tech	4–9	3–6	7th	
1953	Virginia Tech	6–7	4–5	4th	
1954	Virginia Tech	14–8	10–4	1st	NCAA District III playoffs
1955	Virginia Tech	13–8	8–4	3rd	
1956	Virginia Tech	9–12	7–7	6th	
1957	Virginia Tech	9–12	8–7	4th	
1958	Virginia Tech	9–11–1	6–7	6th	
1959	Virginia Tech	12–7	9–5	4th	
1960	Virginia Tech	10–9	7–6	5th	
1961	Virginia Tech	9–15	7–6	4th	
1962	Virginia Tech	11–6	7–5	4th	
1963	Virginia Tech	14–7	10–1	2nd	
1964	Virginia Tech	12–10	9–6	4th	
1965	Virginia Tech	10–13	5–11	7th	
Virginia Tech Hokies (Independent) (1966–1973)
1966	Virginia Tech	10–6			
1967	Virginia Tech	14–10			
1968	Virginia Tech	17–9–1			
1969	Virginia Tech	27–7			NCAA District III playoffs
1970	Virginia Tech	15–11			
1971	Virginia Tech	16–10			
1972	Virginia Tech	15–11			
1973	Virginia Tech	15–10			
Virginia Tech:		343–275–4			
Total:		409–392–5			
National champion Postseason invitational champion Conference regular season champion Conference regular season and conference tournament champion Division regular season champion Division regular season and conference tournament champion Conference tournament champion
