= Harry Rabenhorst =

Biographical details
- Born: April 30, 1898; Baton Rouge, Louisiana, U.S.
- Died: March 24, 1972 (aged 73); Louisiana, U.S.

Playing career

Football
- 1917–1920: Wake Forest
- Position: Fullback

Coaching career (HC unless noted)

Football
- 1918–1919: Wake Forest
- 1921: Greensboro HS (NC)
- 1922–1924: New Mexico Military
- 1925–1942: LSU (assistant)

Basketball
- 1925–1942: LSU
- 1945–1957: LSU

Baseball
- 1927–1942: LSU
- 1946–1956: LSU

Administrative career (AD unless noted)
- 1967–1968: LSU

Head coaching record
- Overall: 3–8 (college football); 340–264 (college basketball); 220–226–3 (college baseball)
- Tournaments: Basketball; 1–1 (NCAA)

Accomplishments and honors

Championships
- Basketball; NCAA Final Four (1953); 2 SEC (1953, 1954) Baseball; 2 SEC (1939, 1946)

Awards
- Baseball; 2x SEC Coach of the Year (1939, 1946)

Harry Aldrich Rabenhorst (April 30, 1898 – March 24, 1972) was an American football player, coach of football, basketball, and baseball, and college athletics administrator.

A native of Baton Rouge, Louisiana, he served as the head basketball coach at Louisiana State University (LSU) from 1925 to 1942 and again from 1945 to 1957. Rabenhorst was also the head baseball coach at LSU from 1927 to 1942 and again from 1946 to 1946 as well as the school's athletic director from 1967 to 1968. His 1935 LSU basketball team won a national championship and his 1953 squad reached the Final Four.

Rabenhorst played college football at Wake Forest as a fullback from 1917 to 1920, captaining the team for three seasons. Rabenhorst holds the record for longest punt in football history. On Thanksgiving Day 1919, against North Carolina State, Rabenhorst got off a world record 115-yard punt that sailed 85 yards in the air. Rabenhorst is credited as Wake Forest's head coach of record for the 1918 and 1919 seasons.

In 1925, Rabenhorst began a very long and successful career at LSU as the head coach of the men's basketball team. Two years later, in 1927, he also became the head baseball coach. Along with his successes in basketball, he also won two SEC baseball titles (1939 and 1946). As a reward for his team's success on the baseball diamond, Rabenhorst was named SEC Coach of the Year in 1939 and 1946, as well. Rabenhorst stepped down as baseball and basketball coach in 1942 when he left to serve in World War II. Upon his return, he again coached the baseball team from 1946 until 1956 and the basketball team from 1946 to 1957. He finished his baseball coaching career with a record of 220–226–3.

== Accolades ==
Rabenhorst is a member of the LSU Athletics Hall of Fame and Louisiana Sports Hall of Fame.

== Head coaching record ==
=== College football ===
Year	Team	Overall	Conference	Standing	Bowl/playoffs
Wake Forest Baptists (Independent) (1918–1919)
1918	Wake Forest	1–2			
1919	Wake Forest	2–6			
Wake Forest:		3–8			
Total:		3–8			

=== College basketball ===
Record table
Season	Team	Overall	Conference	Standing	Postseason
LSU Tigers (Southern Conference) (1925–1932)
1925–26	LSU	9–9	4–5	12th	
1926–27	LSU	7–9	3–5	15th	
1927–28	LSU	14–4	7–3	6th	
1928–29	LSU	8–13	5–9	16th	
1929–30	LSU	10–11	6–7	13th	
1930–31	LSU	7–8	4–4	12th	
1931–32	LSU	11–9	8–8	12th	
LSU Tigers (Southeastern Conference) (1932–1942)
1932–33	LSU	15–8	13–7	4th	
1933–34	LSU	13–4	13–3	3rd	
1934–35	LSU	14–1	12–0	1st	
1935–36	LSU	10–10	9–6	T–6th	
1936–37	LSU	13–7	7–6	7th	
1937–38	LSU	10–10	7–6	6th	
1938–39	LSU	13–7	10–5	4th	
1939–40	LSU	10–8	8–4	4th	
1940–41	LSU	9–9	7–5	5th	
1941–42	LSU	8–7	8–3	4th	
LSU Tigers (Southeastern Conference) (1945–1957)
1945–46	LSU	18–3	8–0	T–1st	
1946–47	LSU	17–4	9–2	2nd	
1947–48	LSU	8–18	4–10	11th	
1948–49	LSU	15–10	7–6	5th	
1949–50	LSU	13–12	5–8	9th	
1950–51	LSU	10–14	6–8	T–5th	
1951–52	LSU	17–7	9–5	T–2nd	
1952–53	LSU	22–3	13–0	1st	NCAA Final Four
1953–54	LSU	20–5	14–0	T–1st	NCAA Sweet 16
1954–55	LSU	6–18	3–11	11th	
1955–56	LSU	7–17	5–9	9th	
1956–57	LSU	6–19	1–13	12th	
LSU:		340–264 (.563)	215–158 (.576)		
Total:		340–264 (.563)			
National champion Postseason invitational champion Conference regular season champion Conference regular season and conference tournament champion Division regular season champion Division regular season and conference tournament champion Conference tournament champion

=== College baseball ===
Record table
Season	Team	Overall	Conference	Standing	Postseason
LSU Tigers (Southern Conference) (1927–1932)
1927	LSU	8–6			
1928	LSU	7–11			
1929	LSU	3–6			
1930	LSU	6–8			
1931	LSU	3–6–1			
1932	LSU	4–7–1			
LSU Tigers (Southeastern Conference) (1933–1942)
1933	LSU	2–8	0–4	7th	
1934	LSU	6–8–1	3–6	7th	
1935	LSU	8–7	4–6	6th	
1936	LSU	15–4	7–4	2nd	
1937	LSU	12–14	5–10	7th	
1938	LSU	7–8–1	3–6–1	8th	
1939	LSU	22–6	10–2	1st	
1940	LSU	16–5	10–4	3rd	
1941	LSU	10–13	5–9	9th	
1942	LSU	9–9	7–5	4th	
LSU Tigers (Southeastern Conference) (1946–1956)
1946	LSU	12–5	11–3	1st	
1947	LSU	10–9–1	4–7	10th	
1948	LSU	7–14–1	4–10	9th	
1949	LSU	6–11	5–9	9th	
1950	LSU	5–9–1	2–7–1	11th	
1951	LSU	10–6	6–6	5th	
1952	LSU	9–11	7–9	7th	
1953	LSU	8–10	7–8	7th	
1954	LSU	8–11	5–10	10th	
1955	LSU	6–17	4–11	10th	
1956	LSU	9–11	7–9	7th	
LSU:		228–240–7 (.487)	116–145–2 (.445)		
Total:		228–240–7 (.487)			
National champion Postseason invitational champion Conference regular season champion Conference regular season and conference tournament champion Division regular season champion Division regular season and conference tournament champion Conference tournament champion

== See also ==
- List of NCAA Division I Men's Final Four appearances by coach
