= Tilden Campbell =

American athlete and coach (1908–1963)

Biographical details
- Born: November 21, 1908; Pine Bluff, Arkansas, U.S.
- Died: February 23, 1963 (aged 54); Tuscaloosa, Alabama, U.S.

Playing career

Football
- 1932–1934: Alabama

Baseball
- 1933–1935: Alabama

Coaching career (HC unless noted)

Football
- 1935–1941: Alabama (backfield)
- 1945: Alabama (backfield)
- 1946: Ole Miss (backfield)
- 1947–1955: Alabama (backfield)

Baseball
- 1935–1942: Alabama
- 1947–1962: Alabama

Head coaching record
- Overall: 344–158–4

Tilden "Happy" Campbell (November 21, 1908 – February 23, 1963) was an American college football and college baseball player and coach. He served two stints as head baseball coach at the University of Alabama, from 1935 to 1942 and 1947 to 1962. Campbell played both football and baseball at Alabama

== Coaching career ==
=== Football ===
After his discharge from the Navy, Campbell returned to Alabama as backfield coach in 1945. In 1946, former Alabama assistant coach Harold Drew, in his first year as head coach, hired Campbell to serve as backfield coach at Ole Miss. When Drew returned to Alabama as head coach in 1947, Campbell followed where he resumed his position as backfield coach and retained it through the 1955 season.

=== Baseball ===
In Spring 1935, Campbell served as manager for the Troy Trojans of the then Dixie Amateur League and lead the squad to the league championship. He resigned his position with Troy in April 1936 after the team became a professional squad as part of the Class D Alabama–Florida League to place his full focus on the Alabama team. During his tenure as head coach, Campbell led Alabama to nine SEC championships and an appearance in the 1950 College World Series en route to an overall record of 344 wins, 158 losses and 4 ties (344–158–4).

On February 23, 1963, Campbell died of a heart attack at his Tuscaloosa home. The following week, athletic director Bear Bryant announced that both Sam Bailey and Hayden Riley would serve as head baseball coach for the 1963 season.

== Head coaching record ==
Record table
Season	Coach	Overall	Conference	Standing	Postseason
Alabama Crimson Tide (Southeastern Conference) (1935–1942)
1935	Alabama	12–2	10–2		
1936	Alabama	10–3–1	7–3–1		
1937	Alabama	12–4	8–2		
1938	Alabama	13–2	9–2		
1939	Alabama	10–10	4–8		
1940	Alabama	14–2	12–1		
1941	Alabama	19–2–1	13–2		
1942	Alabama	10–2	9–1		
Alabama Crimson Tide (Southeastern Conference) (1947–1962)
1947	Alabama	20–7	11–3		NCAA South District III Participant
1948	Alabama	18–11	11–5		NCAA South District III Participant
1949	Alabama	14–8	14–4		
1950	Alabama	22–12	12–4		College World Series
1951	Alabama	17–5–1	14–4–1		
1952	Alabama	13–11	11–8		
1953	Alabama	10–9	8–9		
1954	Alabama	10–7	8–7		
1955	Alabama	23–6	16–2		NCAA District III Participant
1956	Alabama	18–7	15–5		
1957	Alabama	18–8	13–5		
1958	Alabama	14–7	11–5		
1959	Alabama	8–7	8–5		
1960	Alabama	11–7	9–6		
1961	Alabama	12–9	6–9		
1962	Alabama	16–10–1	8–7–1		
Alabama:		344–158–4	247–109–3		
Total:		344–158–4			
National Champions College World Series Participants Conference Champions
