= Charlie Maher =

American baseball player and coach (1902–1971)

Biographical details
- Born: February 7, 1902; Mendon, Michigan, U.S.
- Died: January 31, 1971 (aged 68); Kalamazoo, Michigan, U.S.

Playing career
- 1922–1925: Western Michigan
- 1926: Kalamazoo Celery Pickers
- Position: Catcher

Coaching career (HC unless noted)
- 1937–1943 1946–1967: Western Michigan

Head coaching record
- Overall: 437–197–7
- Tournaments: NCAA: 35–25

Accomplishments and honors

Championships
- 13× MAC regular season (1949, 1950, 1951, 1952, 1955, 1957, 1958, 1959, 1961, 1962, 1963, 1966, 1967)

Charles H. Maher (February 7, 1902 – January 1, 1971) was an American baseball coach and catcher. He played college baseball for Western Michigan for coach Judson Hyames from 1922 to 1925 before playing professionally in 1926. He then served as the head baseball coach of the Western Michigan Broncos from 1937 to 1943 and again from 1946 to 1967, leading the Broncos to six College World Series appearances including a second-place finish in the 1955 College World Series. In 1989, he was inducted into the Mid-American Conference Hall of Fame.

== Head coaching record ==
Record table
Season	Team	Overall	Conference	Standing	Postseason
Western Michigan Broncos (Independent) (1937–1947)
1937	Western Michigan	6–5			
1938	Western Michigan	6–7			
1939	Western Michigan	9–7			
1940	Western Michigan	13–6			
1941	Western Michigan	21–4			
1942	Western Michigan	8–9			
1943	Western Michigan	6–5			
1946	Western Michigan	8–7–1			
1947	Western Michigan	11–8–1			
Western Michigan Broncos (Mid-American Conference) (1948–1967)
1948	Western Michigan	16–5	6–2	2nd	
1949	Western Michigan	18–6–1	8–2	1st	
1950	Western Michigan	15–9–1	9–1	1st	
1951	Western Michigan	17–5	6–0	1st	
1952	Western Michigan	18–7	8–0	1st	College World Series
1953	Western Michigan	17–4	7–1	2nd	
1954	Western Michigan	13–8–1	6–4	3rd	
1955	Western Michigan	25–7	9–0	1st	College World Series
1956	Western Michigan	9–10	5–2	2nd	
1957	Western Michigan	13–5	9–0	1st	District IV Playoff
1958	Western Michigan	23–8–1	10–0	1st	College World Series
1959	Western Michigan	25–9	8–2	T-1st	College World Series
1960	Western Michigan	7–14–1	3–4	6th	
1961	Western Michigan	19–8	11–0	1st	College World Series
1962	Western Michigan	17–6	9–0	1st	District IV Playoff
1963	Western Michigan	24–6	12–0	1st	College World Series
1964	Western Michigan	18–6	7–4	3rd	
1965	Western Michigan	16–6	9–1	2nd	
1966	Western Michigan	21–5	8–1	1st	District IV Playoff
1967	Western Michigan	18–5	8–1	1st	District IV Playoff
Western Michigan:		437–197–7	158–25		
Total:		437–197–7			
National champion Postseason invitational champion Conference regular season champion Conference regular season and conference tournament champion Division regular season champion Division regular season and conference tournament champion Conference tournament champion
