= Wesley Fry =

American football player, coach, and executive (1902–1970)

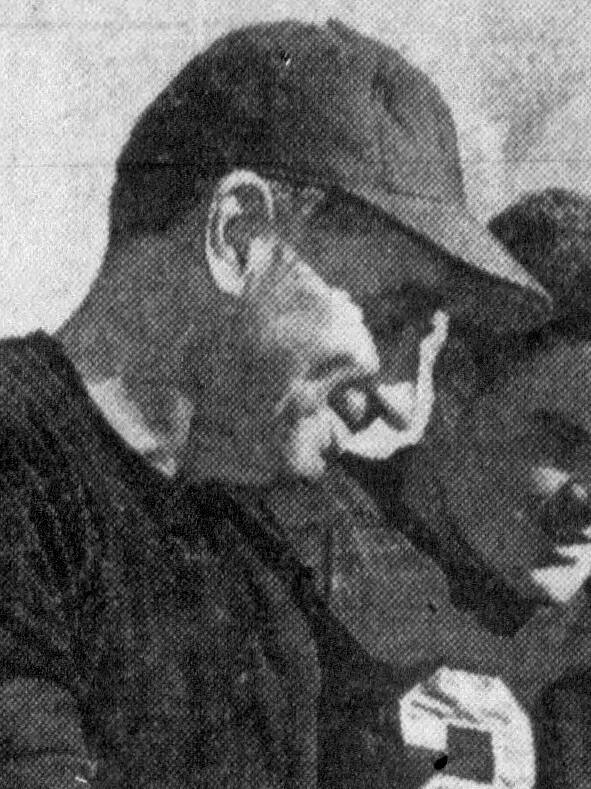
- Fry, circa 1949

Biographical details
- Born: December 10, 1902; Hartley, Iowa, U.S.
- Died: November 11, 1970 (aged 67); La Mesa, California, U.S.

Playing career

Football
- 1923–1925: Iowa
- 1926–1927: New York Yankees
- Position: Fullback

Coaching career (HC unless noted)

Football
- 1928–1932: Classen HS (OK)
- 1933: Oklahoma City
- 1934: Kansas State (assistant)
- 1935–1939: Kansas State
- 1940–1946: Northwestern (assistant)
- 1947–1956: California (assistant)

Baseball
- 1935–1938: Kansas State
- 1944–1946: Northwestern

Administrative career (AD unless noted)
- 1960–1963: Oakland Raiders (GM)

Head coaching record
- Overall: 26–22–6 (college football); 44–9–1 (high school football); 53–53–2 (college baseball)

Accomplishments and honors

Awards
- First-team All-Big Ten (1925)

Wesley Leonard "Cowboy" Fry (December 10, 1902 – November 11, 1970) was an American football player, coach of football and baseball, and professional football executive. He served as the head football coach at Oklahoma City University in 1933 and at Kansas State University from 1935 to 1939, tallying a career college football coach mark of 26–22–6. Fry was also the head baseball coach at Kansas State from 1935 to 1938 and at Northwestern University from 1944 to 1946, compiling a career college baseball record of 53–53–2. He later served as director of player personnel and then as general manager with the Oakland Raiders of the American Football League (AFL) from 1960 to 1963.

== Playing career ==
Fry played college football at the University of Iowa under legendary coach Howard Jones, excelling as a fullback. He was named to play in the first East–West Shrine Game following his senior season in 1925. Fry then spent the 1926 and 1927 seasons playing professional football with Red Grange for the New York Yankees of the National Football League (NFL). At the same time, Fry attended law school.

== Coaching career ==
After earning his law degree, Fry quit playing professional football and sought to practice law in Oklahoma, but he was quickly diverted onto the path of a football coach. He began his career coaching football at Classen High School in Oklahoma City. In his five seasons at Classen, from 1928 to 1932, his football teams compiled a record of 44–9–1. At Classen, Fry also coached the track team. In 1933, Fry served at the head football coach at Oklahoma City University, leading his squad to an 8–1 record. The following year, when future Hall of Fame coach Pappy Waldorf moved north from Oklahoma A&M to Kansas State University, he hired Fry to be his lone assistant coach. Waldorf left Kansas State after one season, and Fry was hired as the new head coach in 1935.

Fry held the head coaching position at Kansas State for five seasons, posting an 18–21–6 record. Fry also coached the baseball team at Kansas State during this time. Fry stepped aside following the 1939 season, but not before coaching the second-ever televised college football game.

For the 1940 season, Fry rejoined Waldorf as an assistant coach at Northwestern University. In 1947, Fry moved with Waldorf to the University of California. Fry remained Waldorf's assistant coach at Cal through the end of Waldorf's term, in 1956, despite receiving offers of head coaching positions from Oregon State University and Arizona State University.

== Administrative career and later life ==
In 1960, Fry joined the Oakland Raiders organization, which was commencing operations as a member of the American Football League. He first served as director of player personnel, then as general manager of the franchise until 1963, when Al Davis was hired as general manager and head coach. Fry died on November 11, 1970, at his home in La Mesa, California.

== Head coaching record ==
=== College football ===
Year	Team	Overall	Conference	Standing
Oklahoma City Goldbugs (Independent) (1933)
1933	Oklahoma City	8–1		
Oklahoma City:		8–1		
Kansas State Wildcats (Big Six Conference) (1935–1939)
1935	Kansas State	2–4–3	1–2–2	4th
1936	Kansas State	4–3–2	2–1–2	3rd
1937	Kansas State	4–5	1–4	T–5th
1938	Kansas State	4–4–1	1–3–1	5th
1939	Kansas State	4–5	1–4	T–4th
Kansas State:		18–21–6	6–14–5	
Total:		26–22–6		

=== College baseball ===
Record table
Season	Team	Overall	Conference	Standing	Postseason
Kansas State Wildcats (Big Six Conference) (1935–1938)
1935	Kansas State	4–5			
1936	Kansas State	5–9			
1937	Kansas State	8–4–1			
1938	Kansas State	8–7			
Kansas State:		25–25–1 (.500)			
Northwestern Wildcats (Big Ten Conference) (1944–1946)
1944	Northwestern	13–3–1			
1945	Northwestern	7–13			
1946	Northwestern	8–12			
Northwestern:		28–28–1 (.500)			
Total:		53–53–2 (.500)			
National champion Postseason invitational champion Conference regular season champion Conference regular season and conference tournament champion Division regular season champion Division regular season and conference tournament champion Conference tournament champion
