= 1924 Mississippi A&M Aggies baseball team =

American college baseball season

1924 Mississippi A&M Aggies baseball

SoCon Co-Champion
- Conference: Southern Conference
- Record: 17–7 (12–3 SoCon)
- Head coach: Dudy Noble

The 1924 Mississippi A&M Aggies baseball team represented the Mississippi Aggies of Mississippi A&M in the 1924 NCAA baseball season. Clay Hopper was an outfielder on the team, and Buddy Myer a second baseman.

== Schedule and results ==
Legend
Mississippi A&M win
Mississippi A&M loss

1924 Mississippi A&M Aggies baseball game log

Regular season
Date	Opponent	Site/stadium	Score	Overall record	SoCon record
	at LSU	State Field • Baton Rouge, LA	W 14–5	1–0	1–0
	at Tulane	New Orleans, LA	L 2–6	1–1	1–1
	at Tulane	New Orleans, LA	W 3–1	2–1	2–1
	Tennessee	Starkville, MS	W 6–4	3–1	3–1
	Tennessee	Starkville, MS	W 8–0	4–1	4–1
	Wisconsin*	Starkville, MS	L 3–4	4–2	
	Illinois*	Starkville, MS	W 6–3	5–2	
	Illinois*	Starkville, MS	L 3–7	5–3	
	Michigan*	Starkville, MS	W 11–4	6–3	
	Michigan*	Starkville, MS	L 1–3	6–4	
	Vanderbilt	Starkville, MS	W 10–2	7–4	5–1
	Vanderbilt	Starkville, MS	W 6–2	8–4	6–1
	Alabama	Starkville, MS	L 3–5	8–5	6–2
	at Alabama	Tuscaloosa, AL	W 8–6	9–5	7–2
	at Alabama	Tuscaloosa, AL	W 6–1	10–5	8–2
	vs Auburn	Montgomery, AL	W 4–0	11–5	9–2
	Mississippi College*	Starkville, MS	W 1–0	12–5	
	Mississippi College*	Starkville, MS	W 9–1	13–5	
	Ole Miss	Starkville, MS	W 3–2	14–5	10–2
	Ole Miss	Starkville, MS	W 6–4	15–5	11–2
	at Ole Miss	Oxford, MS	L 1–2	15–6	11–3
	at Ole Miss	Oxford, MS	W 6–2	16–6	12–3
	at Mississippi College*	Clinton, MS	L 1–2	16–7	
	vs Mississippi College*	Jackson, MS	W 9–5	17–7	
