= 1922 Mississippi A&M Aggies baseball team =

American college baseball season

1922 Mississippi A&M Aggies baseball

SoCon Champion
- Conference: Southern Conference
- Record: 16–6–3 (7–1–1 SoCon)
- Head coach: Dudy Noble

The 1922 Mississippi A&M Aggies baseball team represented the Mississippi Aggies of Mississippi A&M in the 1922 NCAA baseball season. The team featured Cotton Klindworth.

== Schedule and results ==
Legend
Mississippi A&M win
Mississippi A&M loss
Tie

1922 Mississippi A&M Aggies baseball game log

Regular season
Date	Opponent	Site/stadium	Score	Overall record	SoCon record
	at LSU*	State Field • Baton Rouge, LA	W 9–5	1–0	
	at LSU*	State Field • Baton Rouge, LA	L 5–6	1–1	
	at Spring Hill*	Mobile, AL	W 14–5	2–1	
	at Spring Hill*	Mobile, AL	L 0–7	2–2	
	Illinois*	Starkville, MS	T 6–6	2–2–1	
	Illinois*	Starkville, MS	L 3–9	2–3–1	
	Wisconsin*	Starkville, MS	T 6–6	2–3–2	
	Wisconsin*	Starkville, MS	W 6–1	3–3–2	
	at Tennessee	Lower Hudson Field • Knoxville, TN	W 6–4	4–3–2	1–0
	at Vanderbilt	Curry Field • Nashville, TN	W 6–3	5–3–2	2–0
	at Vanderbilt	Curry Field • Nashville, TN	W 9–3	6–3–2	3–0
	at Sewanee	Sewanee, TN	W 6–0	7–3–2	4–0
	at Sewanee	Sewanee, TN	W 2–1	8–3–2	5–0
	Texas*	Starkville, MS	L 1–3	8–4–2	
	Texas*	Starkville, MS	W 8–5	9–4–2	
	Oglethorpe*	Starkville, MS	W 2–0	10–4–2	
	Oglethorpe*	Starkville, MS	L 1–4	10–5–2	
	at Alabama	Tuscaloosa, AL	T 2–2^{7}	10–5–3	5–0–1
	at Alabama	Tuscaloosa, AL	L 2–6	10–6–3	5–1–1
	Ole Miss*	Starkville, MS	W 4–0	11–6–3	
	Ole Miss*	Starkville, MS	W 2–0	12–6–3	1
	at Ole Miss*	Oxford, MS	W5–3	13–6–3	
	at Ole Miss*	Oxford, MS	W 3–2	14–6–3	
	Alabama	Starkville, MS	W 4–0	15–6–3	6–1–1
	Alabama	Starkville, MS	W 3–2	16–6–3	7–1–1
