= 1922 North Carolina Tar Heels baseball team =

American college baseball season

1922 North Carolina Tar Heels baseball

SoCon Champion
- Conference: Southern Conference
- Record: 19–2 (9–1 SoCon)
- Head coach: Bill Fetzer (2nd season)

The 1922 North Carolina Tar Heels baseball team represented the University of North Carolina at Chapel Hill in the 1922 NCAA baseball season. The team posted a 19–2 record, and claimed a Southern Conference championship. The football team also claimed a title.

== Schedule ==
Legend
	North Carolina win
	North Carolina loss
*	Non-Conference game

1922 North Carolina Tar Heels baseball game log
Regular season

Date	Opponent	Site/stadium	Score	Overall record	SoCon record
	Trinity*		W 9–5	1–0	
	Trinity*		W 8–7	2–0	
	Wake Forest*		W 2–0	3–0	
	Wake Forest*		W 12–4	4–0	
	Virginia		W 6–0	5–0	1–0
	Virginia		W 4–0	6–0	2–0
	Virginia		W 7–0	7–0	3–0
	Washington and Lee		L 8–9	7–1	3–1
	Washington and Lee		W 6–3	8–1	4–1
	Washington and Lee		W 9–1	9–1	5–1
	Maryland*		L 5–10	9–2	
	Georgia		W 9–6	10–2	6–1
	Davidson*		W 2–0	11–2	
	VPI		W 7–4	12–2	7–1
	Swarthmore*		W 3–0	13–2	
	NC State		W 3–1	14–2	8–1
	NC State		W 4–1	15–2	9–1
	Lynchburg*		W 10–1	16–2	
	CCNY*		W 15–1	17–2	
	Furman*		W 8–0	18–2	
	NYU*		W 12–8	19–2	
