= 1877 Sewanee Tigers baseball team =

American college baseball season

1877 Sewanee Tigers baseball
- Conference: Independent
- Record: 1–0

The 1877 Sewanee Tigers baseball team represented the Sewanee Tigers baseball team of the University of the South in the 1877 college baseball season. The team beat Vanderbilt 19–12.
