= 1925 Alabama Crimson Tide baseball team =

American college baseball season

1925 Alabama Crimson Tide baseball

SoCon champion
- Conference: Southern Conference
- Record: 21–6 ( SoCon)
- Head coach: Wallace Wade

The 1925 Alabama Crimson Tide baseball team represented the Alabama Crimson Tide of the University of Alabama in the 1925 NCAA baseball season, winning the Southern Conference championship. The team featured Red Barnes and Grant Gillis.
