= 1877 college baseball season =

Seasons
- ← 1876 1878 →

The 1877 college baseball season, play of college baseball in the United States began in the spring of 1877. Play largely consisted of regional matchups, some organized by conferences, and ended in June. No national championship event was held until 1893, while the College World Series began in 1947.

== New programs ==
- Virginia Tech (then Virginia Agricultural and Mechanical College) played its first intercollegiate game, a win against Roanoke. Virginia Tech would not field a team for another intercollegiate game again until 1895.

== Conference standings ==
1877 College baseball independents records
	Conf.						Overall
Team	W		L		T	PCT	W		L		T	PCT
Harvard ‍‍‍	0	–	0	–	0	–	23	–	12	–	1	.653
Princeton ‍‍‍	0	–	0	–	0	–	9	–	12	–	0	.429
Brown ‍‍‍	0	–	0	–	0	–	0	–	3	–	0	.000
As of June 30, 1877; Rankings from Coaches' Poll
