= English Field =

Baseball stadium in Blacksburg, Virginia, U.S.

English Field at Atlantic Union Bank Park
- English Field
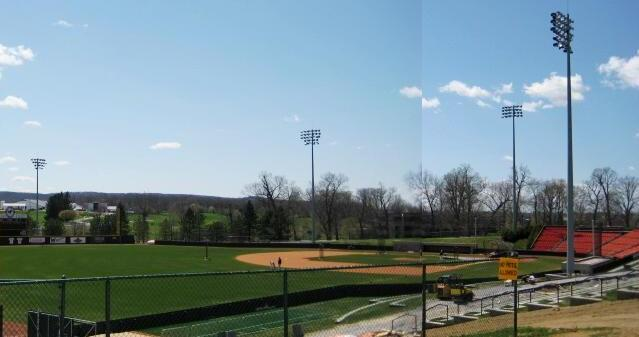

- Location within Virginia Location within the United States
- Interactive map of English Field at Atlantic Union Bank Park
- Full name: English Field at Atlantic Union Bank Park
- Former names: English Field (1989–2016); English Field at Union Park (2016–2019)
- Location: Blacksburg, Virginia
- Coordinates: 37°13′4″N 80°25′24″W
- Owner: Virginia Tech
- Capacity: 1,132 chair backed seats (estimated 4,000 with the terrace seats)
- Surface: AstroTurf GameDay Grass 3D
- Scoreboard: Daktronics
- Field size: Left field: 330 ft (100 m); Center field: 400 ft (120 m); Right field: 330 ft (100 m)

Construction
- Opened: March 22, 1989
- Renovated: 2008, 2018
- Cost: $20 million (2018 renovation)
- Main contractor: Whiting-Turner (2018 renovation)

Tenant
- Virginia Tech Hokies (ACC) 1989–present

English Field at Atlantic Union Bank Park is a baseball stadium in Blacksburg, Virginia. It is the home field of the Virginia Tech Hokies college baseball team. It was opened in 1989 and has a capacity of 1,033 in chair back seats plus additional grass-covered bank seating along the left field line known as "The Hill". English Field underwent an $20 million renovation in 2018.

== Naming ==
The stadium is named after Virginia Tech Outstanding Alumni Award winner E. R. "Red" English and his wife, Ruth, who were financial contributors to the university athletics program for over 50 years. The home team dugout is named for American Baseball Coach Coaches Association Hall of Famer G. F. "Red" Laird who was head coach 1940–1943 and 1948–1973. During the 2016 season, the park was renamed English Field at Union Park. The stadium was later renamed English Field at Atlantic Union Bank Park on May 20, 2019, to align with the rebranding of the commonwealth of Virginia's largest financial institution.

== History ==
=== Opening day ===
On March 22, 1989, the Hokies defeated the baseball team from George Mason University 7–2 in the first game played in the stadium.

=== Home of Chuck Hartman's 1000th career victory ===
English Field was home to Chuck Hartman's 1,000th career victory with a Hokie defeat of Liberty University on April 27, 1992. With this win, Hartman became the 9th baseball coach in Division I history to win 1,000 games.

=== Host of first on-campus athletic event after shootings ===
On April 20, 2007, English Field hosted the first on-campus athletic event after the campus shootings of April 16. A record crowd of 3,132 watched the Hokies play against the Miami Hurricanes. Coinciding with a statewide day of mourning, the Virginia Tech baseball team debuted the first commemorative patch honoring student and professor victims while the Miami players and coaches wore black wristbands. Additionally, Miami head coach Jim Morris presented a $10,000 check on behalf of the university to the Hokie Spirit Memorial Fund.

=== 2008 renovations ===
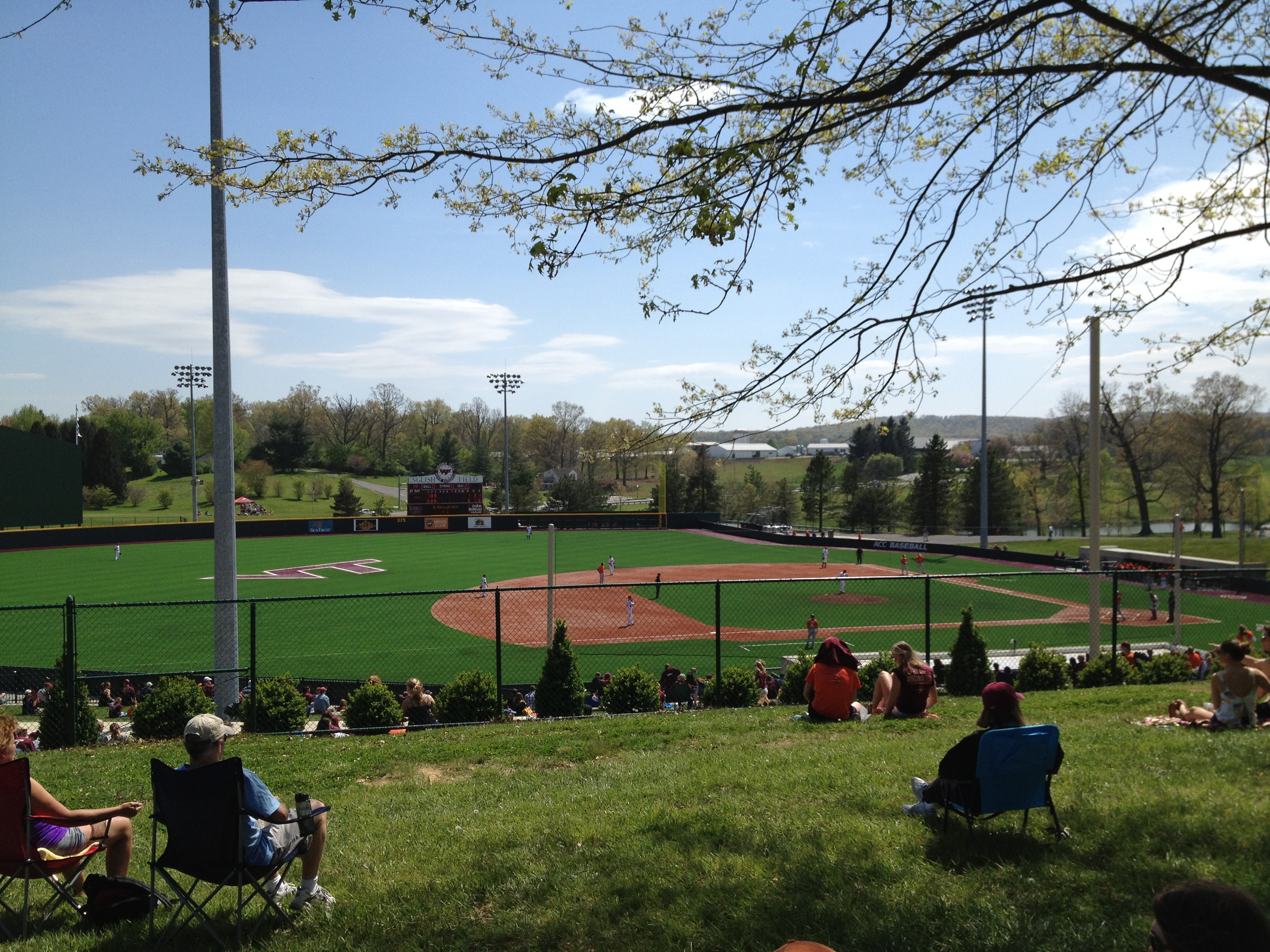
English Field

In early 2008, "The Hill" along the left field line was reworked similar to an outdoor amphitheater. The layout provided seven foot sections between terraces and an expansion of handicap accessibility to the section. Additionally, this caused a reduction in foul territory in the outfield and moved the viewable area closer to the playing area.

The second portion of the renovation is the construction of an indoor batting facility beyond the left-field fence which is scheduled to open in the fall of 2008.

=== 2008 exhibition game versus the New York Yankees ===
==== Announcement ====
Prior to their May 23, 2007, game against the Boston Red Sox, the New York Yankees announced their commitment to play an exhibition game in Blacksburg during 2008 spring training as a way to aid in the healing process of the campus shootings and made a $1 million contribution to the Hokie Spirit Memorial Fund. On October 24, 2007, it was announced that English Field would be the site of an exhibition game between Virginia Tech and the New York Yankees on March 18, 2008.

==== Pre-game activities ====
Upon arriving on campus, the Yankees' players and staff members visited the semicircle stone markers at the campus Drill Field memorial site for the victims. Two ceremonial first pitches were thrown—one was in honor the school faculty by university Police Chief Wendell Flinchum and another by Virginia Tech Rescue Squad Captain Jason Dominiczak on behalf of the student body and 32 balloons were released for the victims. Additionally, the university presented four nameplates engraved in Hokie Stone to the Yankees.

==== The game ====
The starters for the game were left-handed sixth year senior captain Andrew Wells for the Hokies and right-handed Jeff Karstens for the Yankees. With Yankees manager Joe Girardi sitting in the stands with Virginia Tech football coach Frank Beamer in the first inning, Wells got Rodriguez to hit a short sacrifice fly to right field, then got Jason Giambi to ground into an inning-ending double play which emptied the Hokie dugout. Most of the Yankees starters came out during the fourth inning, after which Alex Rodriguez sat on the Hokies' bench and signed autographs. Nine different Hokie pitchers combined in walking 10 batters and allowed 10 hits while Jeff Karstens pitched four innings for the Yankees while allowing two hits and struck out two. The final score was 11–0 in favor of the Yankees.

=== 2018 renovations ===
The stadium was renovated in 2018 by Whiting-Turner. The $20 million renovation project added a new grandstand area with new press-level premium suites, 1,132 permanent chair-back seats in concrete stands, and a club level above the first-base dugout, along with a social picnic area down the right-field line.

The new entrance is reminiscent of the iconic Torgersen Bridge located on campus and named for Paul Ernest Torgersen, university president from 1994 to 2000.

The new grandstands are complete with a ticket booth, restrooms, enhanced concessions, a merchandise office, an umpire dressing room, a storage room for facilities and a visiting team room. The second level includes four luxury suites with an extra hospitality area, broadcast and radio booths, a game operations booth, a press area and video rooms.

== Attendance ==
In 2013, the Hokies ranked 49th among Division I baseball programs in attendance, averaging 1,333 per home game.

== All-time results by year for games played in English Field ==
Year	Wins	Losses	Ties	Winning %
1989	17	7	0	0.708
1990	22	5	0	0.815
1991	17	9	0	0.654
1992	17	3	1	0.850
1993	19	4	0	0.826
1994	17	6	0	0.739
1995	19	6	0	0.760
1996	15	5	0	0.750
1997	17	6	0	0.739
1998	14	8	1	0.636
1999	16	6	0	0.727
2000	15	9	1	0.625
2001	15	7	0	0.682
2002	18	12	0	0.600
2003	18	10	0	0.643
2004	18	10	0	0.643
2005	10	10	0	0.500
2006	14	13	0	0.519
2008	11	16	0	0.407
2008	16	16	0	0.500
2009	18	11	0	0.621
2010	24	7	0	0.774
2011	14	17	0	0.452
2012	23	7	0	0.767
2013	19	11	0	0.633
2014	15	15	0	0.500
2015	16	9	0	0.640
2016	13	15	0	0.464
2017	14	13	0	0.518
2018	10	12	0	0.454
2019	14	15	0	0.483
2020	8	0	0	1.000
2021	17	13	0	0.566
2022	33	7	0	0.825
2023	21	10	0	0.677
2024	22	9	0	0.710
Totals 606-339-3 (0.639)

== See also ==
- List of NCAA Division I baseball venues
- Virginia Tech Hokies
