= 1924 Alabama Crimson Tide baseball team =

American college baseball season

1924 Alabama Crimson Tide baseball

SoCon champion
- Conference: Southern Conference
- Record: 17–6 (9–3 SoCon)
- Head coach: Wallace Wade

The 1924 Alabama Crimson Tide baseball team represented the Alabama Crimson Tide of the University of Alabama in the 1924 NCAA baseball season, winning the Southern Conference championship.

== Schedule and results ==
Legend
Alabama win
Alabama loss
Tie

1924 Alabama Crimson Tide baseball game log

Regular season
Date	Opponent	Site/stadium	Score	Overall record	SoCon record
	Ohio State*		W 5–4^{10}	1–0	
	Ohio State*		W 12–1	2–0	
	Birmingham Barons*		W 6–1	3–0	
	Furman*		W 12–0	4–0	
	Furman*		W 7–3	5–0	
	Tennessee		W 10–0	6–0	1–0
	Tennessee		W 3–2	7–0	2–0
	Howard*		W 5–1	8–0	
	Howard*		W 14–7	9–0	
	at Mercer*	Macon, GA	L 4–5	9–1	
	at Mercer*	Macon, GA	W 4–1	10–1	
	at Georgia	Athens, GA	W 8–2	11–1	2–0
	at Georgia	Athens, GA	L 2–4	11–2	2–1
	vs Vanderbilt	Montgomery, AL	W 8–4	12–2	3–1
	Vanderbilt	Tuscaloosa, AL	W 9–7	13–2	4–1
	at Mississippi A&M	Starkville, AL	W 5–3	14–2	5–1
	Mississippi A&M	Tuscaloosa, AL	L 6–8	14–3	5–2
	Mississippi A&M	Tuscaloosa, AL	L 1–6	14–4	5–3
	at Oglethorpe*	Atlanta, GA	L 7–11	14–5	
	at Oglethorpe*	Atlanta, GA	L 1–7	14–6	
	at Georgia Tech	Atlanta, GA	W 8–6	15–6	6–3
	North Carolina		W 6–2	16–6	7–3
	North Carolina		W 5–1	17–6	8–3
