= List of Big Ten Conference softball champions =

The Big Ten Conference has been playing softball since 1982 when the Big Ten Conference softball tournament was established to decide its champion. The Big Ten then began league play the following season in 1983 while eliminating the tournament until 1995. The tournament ran again from 1995 to 2008 and then again from 2013 to present day, which is used to determine the league's automatic bid to the NCAA Division I Softball Championship while the regular season determines the conference champion.

== Champions ==
These are the official Big Ten champions based on standings. 1982 was the only year the conference tournament was used to determine the champion. After that, the regular season determined the champion while the tournament held from 1983 to 1994 and 2009-13 was used only to determine the automatic bid into the NCAA Division I softball tournament.

Year	Regular season champion	Conference Tournament Champion	National Championship	Notes
1982	–	Northwestern		Big Ten softball tournament only. Teams from Indiana, Iowa, Michigan, Michigan State, Minnesota, Northwestern, and Ohio State participate.
1983	Indiana	–		Tournament eliminated, first regular season of conference play. Indiana , Iowa , Michigan , Michigan State , Minnesota , Northwestern , and Ohio State compete.
1984	Northwestern	–		
1985	Northwestern	–		
1986	Indiana; Minnesota; Northwestern	–		
1987	Northwestern	–		
1988	Minnesota	–		
1989	Iowa	–		
1990	Iowa; Ohio State	–		
1991	Minnesota	–		
1992	Michigan	–		Penn State begins league play.
1993	Michigan	–		
1994	Indiana	–		
1995	Michigan	Michigan		Conference tournament resumes in double-elimination format. Purdue begins league play.
1996	Michigan	Michigan		Wisconsin begins league play.
1997	Iowa	Michigan		
1998	Michigan	Michigan		
1999	Michigan	Minnesota		
2000	Iowa	Michigan		
2001	Michigan	Iowa		Illinois begins league play.
2002	Michigan	Michigan		
2003	Iowa	Iowa		
2004	Michigan	Michigan State		
2005	Michigan	Michigan	Michigan	First (and to-date only) Big Ten softball National Champion
2006	Northwestern	Michigan		
2007	Ohio State	Ohio State		
2008	Michigan; Northwestern	Northwestern		
2009	Michigan	–		Conference tournament eliminated again.
2010	Michigan	–		
2011	Michigan	–		
2012	Michigan	–		Nebraska begins league play.
2013	Michigan	Wisconsin		Conference tournament resumes in single-elimination format.
2014	Michigan; Nebraska	Minnesota		
2015	Michigan	Michigan		Maryland and Rutgers begin league play.
2016	Michigan	Minnesota		
2017	Minnesota	Minnesota		
2018	Michigan	Minnesota		
2019	Michigan	Michigan		
2020	Season cancelled due to the COVID-19 pandemic			
2021	Michigan	–		Conference tournament canceled due to the coronavirus pandemic.
2022	Northwestern	Nebraska		
2023	Northwestern	Northwestern		
2024	Northwestern	Michigan		
2025	Oregon	Michigan		Oregon , UCLA , and Washington begin league play.

== Championships by school ==
School	Big Ten Championships Reg. Season/Tournament	Regular season Championships	Tournament Championships
Illinois	0/0		
Indiana	3/0	1983, 1986*, 1994	
Iowa	5/2	1989, 1990*, 1997, 2000, 2003	2001, 2003
Maryland	0/0		
Michigan	22/12	1992, 1993, 1995, 1996, 1998, 1999, 2001, 2002, 2004, 2005, 2008*, 2009, 2010, 2011, 2012, 2013, 2014*, 2015, 2016, 2018, 2019, 2021	1995, 1996, 1997, 1998, 2000, 2002, 2005, 2006, 2015, 2019, 2024, 2025
Michigan State	0/1		2004
Minnesota	4/5	1986*, 1988, 1991, 2017	1999, 2014, 2016, 2017, 2018
Nebraska	1/1	2014	2022
Northwestern	8/3	1984, 1985, 1986*, 1987, 2006, 2008*, 2022, 2023	1982, 2008, 2023
Ohio State	2/1	1990*, 2007	2007
Oregon	1/0	2025	
Penn State	0/0		
Purdue	0/0		
Rutgers	0/0		
UCLA	0/0		
Washington	0/0		
Wisconsin	0/1		2013

- An asterisk (*) indicates a shared (regular season) Big Ten championship.

== See also ==
List of Big Ten Conference baseball champions
