= 1922 NCAA baseball season =

American college baseball season

Seasons
- ← 1921 1923 →

The 1922 NCAA baseball season, play of college baseball in the United States organized by the National Collegiate Athletic Association (NCAA) began in the spring of 1922. Play largely consisted of regional matchups, some organized by conferences, and ended in June. No national championship event was held until 1947. In the northeast, the season began on March 29.

== Conference Changes ==
- Idaho and Southern California joined the Pacific Coast Conference, creating an 8-team league.
- The Southern Conference was established ahead of the 1922 season, with many schools departing the Southern Intercollegiate Athletic Association.

== Conference winners ==
This is a partial list of conference champions from the 1922 season.

Conference	Regular season winner
Big Ten Conference	Illinois
Missouri Valley	Kansas
Pacific Coast Conference	Washington
Southwest Conference	Texas
Southern Conference	Mississippi A&M and North Carolina
