= Virginia Tech Hokies baseball =

- 2026 Virginia Tech Hokies baseball team
- Founded: 1895; 131 years ago
- University: Virginia Tech
- Head coach: John Szefc (9th season)
- Conference: ACC; Coastal Division
- Location: Blacksburg, Virginia
- Home stadium: English Field (capacity: 1,132)
- Nickname: Hokies
- Colors: Chicago maroon and burnt orange

NCAA regional champions
- 2022

NCAA tournament appearances
- 1954, 1969, 1976, 1977, 1994, 1997, 1999, 2000, 2010, 2013, 2022, 2026

Conference regular season champions
- 1954, 1981, 1996, 1997, 1999, 2000, 2022

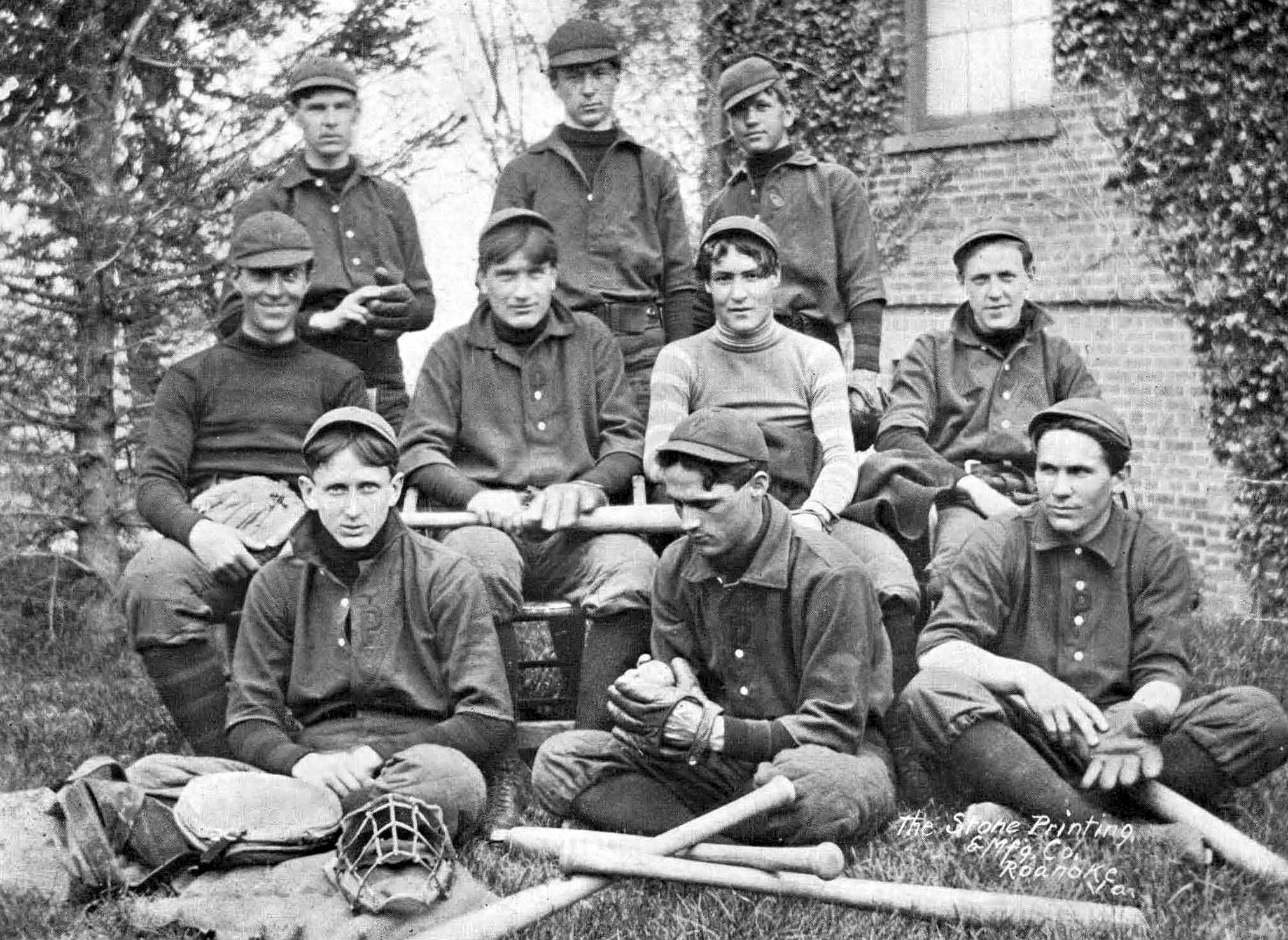
1899 Virginia baseball team

The Virginia Tech Hokies baseball team represents Virginia Polytechnic Institute and State University (Virginia Tech) in NCAA Division I college baseball. Established in 1895, the team participates in the Coastal division of the Atlantic Coast Conference and plays its home games at English Field. The team's current head coach is John Szefc. The Hokies are one of two current ACC teams that have never participated in the NCAA Men's College World Series, along with Pittsburgh.

== Coaching records ==
Tenure	Coach	Seasons	Record	Pct.
1895	James M. McJames	1	3–2	.600
1896	R. S. Wilkins	1	3–8	.273
1897	Lipep	1	9–6	.600
1900–1901	A. B. Morrison Jr.	2	11–8	.579
1903	Albert L. Orth	1	8–4	.667
1904	R. R. Brown	1	6–5	.545
1905	Dr. Knox	1	6–5	.545
1906–1907	S. S. Eckerstone	2	10–11	.476
1908	Sally Miles	1	3–3–1	.500
1909	R. M. Brown	1	11–6	.647
1910–1911	Branch Bocock	2	23–14–1	.618
1912	Lew Riess	1	9–9	.500
1913	Sally Miles	1	3–3	.500
1914	Branch Bocock	1	15–4–1	.775
1915	R. B. Prince	1	21–0	1.000
1916–1917	Bill Breintenstein	2	18–5	.783
1918–1920	Charles Bernier	3	36–23	.610
1921–1923	William L. Younger	3	31–27–3	.533
1924–1932	George S. Kircher	9	77–56–7	.575
1933–1939	Herbert McEver	7	41–72–1	.364
1940–1943	Flake Laird	4	27–28–1	.491
1944	Herbert McEver	1	9–4	..692
1945–1947	George S. Proctor	3	29–21	.580
1948–1973	Flake Laird	26	316–247–3	.561
1974–1978	Bob Humphreys	5	135–60	.692
1979–2006	Chuck Hartman	28	961–591–8	.619
2006–2013	Pete Hughes	7	182–152	.545
2014–2017	Pat Mason	4	90–126–1	.417
Totals	23 coaches	123 seasons	2,100–1,507–27	.582

== Virginia Tech in the NCAA tournament ==
Year	Coach	Record	Notes
1954	G.F. Laird	2–2	District 3 Defeated Clemson, 11–0; Defeated Clemson, 7–1; Lost to Rollins, 0–3; Eliminated by Rollins, 0–9
1969	G.F. Laird	1–2	District 3 Lost to Ole Miss, 6–7; Defeated Furman, 6–3; Eliminated by North Carolina, 1–5
1976	Bob Humphreys	0–2	Atlantic Regional; Lost to South Carolina, 6–7; Eliminated by Furman, 4–5
1977	Bob Humphreys	0–2	Mideast Regional; Lost to Central Michigan, 1–2; Eliminated by Florida, 4–9
1994	Chuck Hartman	0–2	East Regional; Lost to Auburn, 0–7; Eliminated by The Citadel, 3–4
1997	Chuck Hartman	1–2	South II Regional; Defeated USC, 3–2; Lost to NC State, 6–12; Eliminated by USC, 2–6
1999	Chuck Hartman	1–2	Winston-Salem Regional; Lost to Richmond, 3–5; Defeated Siena, 11–5; Eliminated by Richmond, 8–11
2000	Chuck Hartman	0–2	Fullerton Regional; Lost to USC, 3–8; Eliminated by Cal State Fullerton, 6–8
2010	Pete Hughes	2–2	Columbia Regional; Lost to The Citadel, 2–7; Defeated Bucknell, 16–7; Defeated The Citadel, 4–3; Eliminated by South Carolina, 2–10
2013	Pete Hughes	2–2	Blacksburg Regional; Lost to Connecticut, 2–5; Defeated Coastal Carolina, 9–1; Defeated Connecticut, 3–1; Eliminated by Oklahoma, 4–10
2022	John Szefc	4–2	Blacksburg Regional; Defeated Wright State, 15–9; Defeated Columbia, 24–4; Defeated Columbia, 7–2 Blacksburg Super Regional; Lost to Oklahoma, 4–5; Defeated Oklahoma, 14–8; Eliminated by Oklahoma, 2–11
2026	John Szefc	0–2	Los Angeles Regional; Lost to Cal Poly, 2–6; Eliminated by UCLA, 5–6
Totals		13–24	12 appearances
The format of the tournament has changed through the years.

=== MLB alumni ===
- Wyatt Toregas
- Brian Fitzgerald
- Kevin Barker
- Brad Clontz
- Mike Williams
- George Canale
- Franklin Stubbs
- Johnny Oates
- Leo Burke
- Toby Atwell
- Cloy Mattox
- Buddy Dear
- Chad Pinder
- Wally Shaner
- Joe Mantiply
- Erwin Renfer
- Joe Saunders
- Jesse Hahn
- Ben Rowen
- Mark Zagunis
- Packy Naughton
- Kerry Carpenter
- Nic Enright
- Ian Seymour
- Zach Brzykcy
