= 1923 NCAA baseball season =

American college baseball season

Seasons
- ← 1922 1924 →

The 1923 NCAA baseball season, play of college baseball in the United States organized by the National Collegiate Athletic Association (NCAA) began in the spring of 1923. Play largely consisted of regional matchups, some organized by conferences, and ended in June. No national championship event was held until 1947. In the northeast, many college began their seasons on or about March 31.

== Conference Changes ==
- The Pacific Coast Conference divided into two divisions, with the California schools (California, Southern California, Stanford) making up the Southern and the remaining five schools (Idaho, Oregon, Oregon State, Washington, Washington State) forming the Northern.

== Conference winners ==
This is a partial list of conference champions from the 1923 season.

Conference	Regular season winner
Big Ten Conference	Michigan
Missouri Valley	Kansas
Pacific Coast Conference	North - Washington; South - California
Southern Conference	Georgia Tech
Southwest Conference	Baylor
