= 1925 NCAA baseball season =

American college baseball season

Seasons
- ← 1924 1926 →

The 1925 NCAA baseball season, play of college baseball in the United States organized by the National Collegiate Athletic Association (NCAA) began in the spring of 1925. Play largely consisted of regional matchups, some organized by conferences, and ended in June. No national championship event was held until 1947.

== Conference changes ==
- The Pacific Coast Conference returned to its two division format after one season in a single conference, with the California schools (California, Southern California, Stanford) making up the Southern and the remaining five schools (Idaho, Oregon, Oregon State, Washington, Washington State) forming the Northern.

== Conference winners ==
This is a partial list of conference champions from the 1925 season.

Conference	Regular season winner
Big Ten Conference	Indiana
Missouri Valley	Oklahoma
Pacific Coast Conference	North - Oregon State; South - Stanford
Southern Conference	Alabama
Southwest Conference	Texas
