= 1924 NCAA baseball season =

American college baseball season

Seasons
- ← 1923 1925 →

The 1924 NCAA baseball season, play of college baseball in the United States organized by the National Collegiate Athletic Association (NCAA) began in the spring of 1924. Play largely consisted of regional matchups, some organized by conferences, and ended in June. No national championship event was held until 1947.

== Conference realignment, format changes, and new programs ==
- The Pacific Coast Conference played as a single division. The Conference split into North and South Divisions for the 1923 season, and resumed divisional play in 1925. They would maintain divisions until the formation of the Pac-8 Conference.
- Evansville played their first varsity season. They would play through 1926 before folding the team, relaunching in 1946.

== Conference winners ==
This is a partial list of conference champions from the 1924 season.

Conference	Regular season winner
Big Ten Conference	Michigan/Ohio State
Missouri Valley	Iowa State
Pacific Coast Conference	California
Southern Conference	Alabama
Southwest Conference	Texas
