= 1944 NCAA baseball season =

Baseball season

Seasons
- ← 1943 1945 →

The 1944 NCAA baseball season, play of college baseball in the United States organized by the National Collegiate Athletic Association (NCAA) began in the spring of 1944. Play largely consisted of regional matchups, some organized by conferences, and ended in June. No national championship event was held until 1947.

== Conference winners ==
This is a partial list of conference champions from the 1944 season.

Conference	Regular season winner
Big Nine	Michigan
CIBA	UCLA
EIBL	Columbia
Pacific Coast Conference North	Washington State

== Conference standings ==
The following is an incomplete list of conference standings:

1944 Eastern Intercollegiate Baseball League baseball standings
	Conf.						Overall
Team	W		L		T	PCT	W		L		T	PCT
Columbia ‍†‍‍	7	–	1	–	0	.875	11	–	6	–	1	.639
Dartmouth ‍‍‍	5	–	1	–	0	.833	17	–	10	–	0	.630
Yale ‍‍‍	4	–	1	–	0	.800	9	–	2	–	0	.818
Princeton ‍‍‍	4	–	4	–	0	.500	9	–	7	–	0	.563
Penn ‍‍‍	1	–	5	–	0	.167	2	–	10	–	0	.167
Cornell ‍‍‍	1	–	7	–	0	.125	2	–	9	–	0	.182
† – Conference champion
