= 1945 NCAA baseball season =

Baseball season

Seasons
- ← 1944 1946 →

The 1945 NCAA baseball season, play of college baseball in the United States organized by the National Collegiate Athletic Association (NCAA) began in the spring of 1945. Play largely consisted of regional matchups, some organized by conferences, and ended in June. No national championship event was held until 1947.

The American Baseball Coaches Association, then known as the American Association of Collegiate Baseball Coaches, was founded in 1945 to promote amateur baseball. One stated objective was the establishment of a College World Series.

== Conference winners ==
This is a partial list of conference champions from the 1945 season.

Conference	Regular season winner
Big Nine	Michigan
CIBA	California
EIBL	Princeton
Pacific Coast Conference North	Washington State
Southeastern Conference	LSU
Southwest Conference	Texas

== Conference standings ==
The following is an incomplete list of conference standings:

1945 Eastern Intercollegiate Baseball League baseball standings
	Conf.						Overall
Team	W		L		T	PCT	W		L		T	PCT
Yale ‍†‍‍	6	–	1	–	0	.857	8	–	4	–	1	.654
Princeton ‍‍‍	5	–	3	–	0	.625	9	–	8	–	0	.529
Columbia ‍‍‍	4	–	3	–	0	.571	8	–	6	–	0	.571
Dartmouth ‍‍‍	4	–	4	–	0	.500	8	–	15	–	0	.348
Penn ‍‍‍	3	–	4	–	0	.429	9	–	6	–	0	.600
Cornell ‍‍‍	4	–	6	–	0	.400	4	–	11	–	0	.267
† – Conference champion
