= 1943 NCAA baseball season =

Baseball season

Seasons
- ← 1942 1944 →

The 1943 NCAA baseball season, play of college baseball in the United States organized by the National Collegiate Athletic Association (NCAA) began in the spring of 1943. Play largely consisted of regional matchups, some organized by conferences, and ended in June. No national championship event was held until 1947.

== Conference winners ==
This is a partial list of conference champions from the 1943 season.

Conference	Regular season winner
Big Nine	Ohio State
CIBA	California
EIBL	Penn
New England Conference	New Hampshire
Pacific Coast Conference North	Oregon/Oregon State
Southeastern Conference	LSU
Southwest Conference	Texas/Texas A&M

== Conference standings ==
The following is an incomplete list of conference standings:

1943 Eastern Intercollegiate Baseball League baseball standings
	Conf.						Overall
Team	W		L		T	PCT	W		L		T	PCT
Penn ‍†‍‍	6	–	2	–	0	.750	9	–	5	–	0	.643
Cornell ‍‍‍	3	–	1	–	0	.750	5	–	2	–	0	.714
Columbia ‍‍‍	2	–	2	–	0	.500	3	–	6	–	0	.333
Princeton ‍‍‍	2	–	6	–	0	.250	8	–	8	–	0	.500
Dartmouth ‍‍‍	1	–	3	–	0	.250	12	–	8	–	1	.595
Yale ‍‍‍	0	–	2	–	0	.000	3	–	6	–	0	.333
† – Conference champion
