= 1935 NCAA baseball season =

Baseball season

Seasons
- ← 1934 1936 →

The 1935 NCAA baseball season, play of college baseball in the United States organized by the National Collegiate Athletic Association (NCAA) began in the spring of 1935. Play largely consisted of regional matchups, some organized by conferences, and ended in June. No national championship event was held until 1947.

== Conference winners ==
This is a partial list of conference champions from the 1935 season.

Conference	Regular season winner
Big Nine	Minnesota
Big Six	Oklahoma
CIBA	California/Southern California
EIBL	Dartmouth
Pacific Coast Conference North	Oregon
Southeastern Conference	Alabama
Southwest Conference	Texas

== Conference standings ==
The following is an incomplete list of conference standings:

1935 Eastern Intercollegiate Baseball League baseball standings
	Conf.						Overall
Team	W		L		T	PCT	W		L		T	PCT
Dartmouth ‍†‍‍	11	–	1	–	0	.917	15	–	5	–	1	.738
Harvard ‍‍‍	8	–	4	–	0	.667	16	–	9	–	1	.635
Yale ‍‍‍	8	–	6	–	0	.571	12	–	12	–	0	.500
Cornell ‍‍‍	5	–	7	–	0	.417	8	–	13	–	1	.386
Princeton ‍‍‍	5	–	7	–	0	.417	11	–	15	–	0	.423
Columbia ‍‍‍	4	–	8	–	0	.333	5	–	10	–	0	.333
Penn ‍‍‍	3	–	9	–	0	.250	9	–	11	–	0	.450
† – Conference champion
