= 1946 NCAA baseball season =

Baseball season

Seasons
- ← 1945 1947 →

The 1946 NCAA baseball season, play of college baseball in the United States organized by the National Collegiate Athletic Association (NCAA) began in the spring of 1946. Play largely consisted of regional matchups, some organized by conferences, and ended in June. No national championship event was held until 1947.

The American Baseball Coaches Association, then known as the American Association of Collegiate Baseball Coaches, was founded in 1945 to promote amateur baseball. One stated objective was the establishment of a College World Series. After the 1946 season, a collegiate all-star game was held by the ABCA at Fenway Park. The Eastern All-Stars, coached by Jack Barry of Holy Cross defeated the Midwest All-Stars under the leadership of Ray Fisher from Michigan.

== Conference winners ==
This is a partial list of conference champions from the 1946 season.

Conference	Regular season winner
Big Nine	Wisconsin
Big Six	Oklahoma
CIBA	Southern California
EIBL	Yale
Pacific Coast Conference North	Oregon
Southeastern Conference	LSU
Southwest Conference	Texas

== Conference standings ==
The following is an incomplete list of conference standings:

1946 Eastern Intercollegiate Baseball League baseball standings
	Conf.				Overall
Team	W		L	PCT	W		L	PCT
Yale ‍†‍‍	10	–	1	.909	14	–	4	.778
Penn ‍‍‍	5	–	3	.625	8	–	6	.571
Columbia ‍‍‍	5	–	4	.556	7	–	7	.500
Cornell ‍‍‍	5	–	4	.556	11	–	7	.611
Princeton ‍‍‍	3	–	7	.300	9	–	14	.391
Dartmouth ‍‍‍	2	–	8	.200	5	–	13	.278
† – Conference champion
