= 1939 NCAA baseball season =

Baseball season

Seasons
- ← 1938 1940 →

The 1939 NCAA baseball season, play of college baseball in the United States organized by the National Collegiate Athletic Association (NCAA) began in the spring of 1939. Play largely consisted of regional matchups, some organized by conferences, and ended in June. No national championship event was held until 1947.

== Conference winners ==
This is a partial list of conference champions from the 1939 season.

Conference	Regular season winner
Big Nine	Iowa
Big Six	Oklahoma
CIBA	Saint Mary's/Southern California
EIBL	Harvard/Cornell
New England Conference	Rhode Island
Pacific Coast Conference North	Oregon
Southeastern Conference	LSU
Southwest Conference	Texas

== Conference standings ==
The following is an incomplete list of conference standings:

1939 Eastern Intercollegiate Baseball League baseball standings
	Conf.						Overall
Team	W		L		T	PCT	W		L		T	PCT
Harvard ‍†‍‍	9	–	3	–	0	.750	16	–	10	–	0	.615
Cornell ‍‍‍	8	–	3	–	0	.727	10	–	11	–	1	.477
Dartmouth ‍‍‍	8	–	4	–	0	.667	13	–	12	–	1	.519
Penn ‍‍‍	5	–	7	–	0	.417	11	–	12	–	0	.478
Princeton ‍‍‍	5	–	7	–	0	.417	9	–	16	–	0	.360
Yale ‍‍‍	5	–	10	–	0	.333	11	–	20	–	0	.355
Columbia ‍‍‍	2	–	10	–	0	.167	5	–	11	–	0	.313
† – Conference champion
