= 1940 NCAA baseball season =

Baseball season

Seasons
- ← 1939 1941 →

The 1940 NCAA baseball season, play of college baseball in the United States organized by the National Collegiate Athletic Association (NCAA) began in the spring of 1940. Play largely consisted of regional matchups, some organized by conferences, and ended in June. No national championship event was held until 1947.

== Conference winners ==
This is a partial list of conference champions from the 1940 season.

Conference	Regular season winner
Big Nine	Illinois/Northwestern
Big Six	Oklahoma
CIBA	Saint Mary's
EIBL	Cornell
New England Conference	Northeastern
Pacific Coast Conference North	Oregon State
Southeastern Conference	Alabama
Southwest Conference	Texas

== Conference standings ==
The following is an incomplete list of conference standings:

1940 Eastern Intercollegiate Baseball League baseball standings
	Conf.						Overall
Team	W		L		T	PCT	W		L		T	PCT
Cornell ‍†‍‍	10	–	1	–	0	.909	13	–	6	–	0	.684
Dartmouth ‍‍‍	6	–	3	–	0	.667	12	–	11	–	0	.522
Columbia ‍‍‍	6	–	5	–	0	.545	8	–	6	–	0	.571
Princeton ‍‍‍	6	–	6	–	0	.500	10	–	15	–	1	.404
Yale ‍‍‍	7	–	8	–	0	.467	16	–	11	–	0	.593
Harvard ‍‍‍	3	–	8	–	0	.273	8	–	18	–	0	.308
Penn ‍‍‍	2	–	10	–	0	.167	8	–	16	–	0	.333
† – Conference champion
