= 1936 NCAA baseball season =

Baseball season

Seasons
- ← 1935 1937 →

The 1936 NCAA baseball season, play of college baseball in the United States organized by the National Collegiate Athletic Association (NCAA) began in the spring of 1936. Play largely consisted of regional matchups, some organized by conferences, and ended in June. No national championship event was held until 1947.

== Conference winners ==
This is a partial list of conference champions from the 1936 season.

Conference	Regular season winner
Big Nine	Michigan
Big Six	Iowa State/Oklahoma
CIBA	Southern California
EIBL	Dartmouth/Harvard
Pacific Coast Conference North	Washington State
Southeastern Conference	Alabama
Southwest Conference	Texas

== Conference standings ==
The following is an incomplete list of conference standings:

1936 Eastern Intercollegiate Baseball League baseball standings
	Conf.						Overall
Team	W		L		T	PCT	W		L		T	PCT
Dartmouth ‍†‍‍	8	–	4	–	0	.667	15	–	8	–	0	.652
Harvard ‍†‍‍	8	–	4	–	0	.667	16	–	10	–	0	.615
Penn ‍‍‍	6	–	5	–	0	.545	7	–	11	–	0	.389
Yale ‍‍‍	7	–	8	–	0	.467	11	–	12	–	0	.478
Princeton ‍‍‍	5	–	7	–	0	.417	10	–	15	–	1	.404
Columbia ‍‍‍	3	–	6	–	0	.333	5	–	10	–	0	.333
Cornell ‍‍‍	2	–	8	–	0	.200	5	–	13	–	0	.278
† – Conference champion
