= 1941 NCAA baseball season =

Baseball season

Seasons
- ← 1940 1942 →

The 1941 NCAA baseball season, play of college baseball in the United States organized by the National Collegiate Athletic Association (NCAA) began in the spring of 1941. Play largely consisted of regional matchups, some organized by conferences, and ended in June. No national championship event was held until 1947.

== Conference winners ==
This is a partial list of conference champions from the 1941 season.

Conference	Regular season winner
Big Nine	Michigan
Big Six	Missouri
CIBA	California/Saint Mary's
EIBL	Princeton
New England Conference	Rhode Island
Pacific Coast Conference North	Oregon
Southeastern Conference	Alabama
Southwest Conference	Texas

== Conference standings ==
The following is an incomplete list of conference standings:

1941 Eastern Intercollegiate Baseball League baseball standings
	Conf.				Overall
Team	W		L	PCT	W		L	PCT
Princeton ‍†‍‍	9	–	3	.750	15	–	11	.577
Cornell ‍‍‍	8	–	4	.667	12	–	9	.571
Yale ‍‍‍	8	–	5	.615	17	–	7	.708
Dartmouth ‍‍‍	7	–	5	.583	11	–	12	.478
Harvard ‍‍‍	4	–	8	.333	7	–	18	.280
Penn ‍‍‍	4	–	8	.333	9	–	13	.409
Columbia ‍‍‍	3	–	9	.250	4	–	13	.235
† – Conference champion
