= 1942 NCAA baseball season =

Baseball season

Seasons
- ← 1941 1943 →

The 1942 NCAA baseball season, play of college baseball in the United States organized by the National Collegiate Athletic Association (NCAA) began in the spring of 1942. Play largely consisted of regional matchups, some organized by conferences, and ended in June. No national championship event was held until 1947.

== Conference winners ==
This is a partial list of conference champions from the 1942 season.

Conference	Regular season winner
Big Nine	Iowa/Michigan
Big Six	Missouri
CIBA	Southern California
EIBL	Princeton
New England Conference	Northeastern
Pacific Coast Conference North	Oregon
Southeastern Conference	Alabama
Southwest Conference	Texas A&M

== Conference standings ==
The following is an incomplete list of conference standings:

1942 Eastern Intercollegiate Baseball League baseball standings
	Conf.						Overall
Team	W		L		T	PCT	W		L		T	PCT
Princeton ‍†‍‍	11	–	1	–	0	.917	14	–	6	–	0	.700
Harvard ‍‍‍	5	–	5	–	0	.500	9	–	9	–	0	.500
Columbia ‍‍‍	5	–	7	–	0	.417	5	–	12	–	0	.294
Cornell ‍‍‍	5	–	7	–	0	.417	6	–	15	–	0	.286
Penn ‍‍‍	5	–	7	–	0	.417	8	–	10	–	1	.447
Yale ‍‍‍	4	–	7	–	1	.375	8	–	12	–	1	.405
Dartmouth ‍‍‍	3	–	5	–	1	.389	15	–	11	–	1	.574
† – Conference champion
