= 1937 NCAA baseball season =

Baseball season

Seasons
- ← 1936 1938 →

The 1937 NCAA baseball season, play of college baseball in the United States organized by the National Collegiate Athletic Association (NCAA) began in the spring of 1937. Play largely consisted of regional matchups, some organized by conferences, and ended in June. No national championship event was held until 1947.

== Conference winners ==
This is a partial list of conference champions from the 1937 season.

Conference	Regular season winner
Big Nine	Illinois
Big Six	Missouri
CIBA	California
EIBL	Yale
New England Conference	Rhode Island
Pacific Coast Conference North	Oregon
Southeastern Conference	Auburn
Southwest Conference	Texas A&M

== Conference standings ==
The following is an incomplete list of conference standings:

1937 Eastern Intercollegiate Baseball League baseball standings
	Conf.						Overall
Team	W		L		T	PCT	W		L		T	PCT
Yale ‍†‍‍	11	–	3	–	0	.786	21	–	7	–	0	.750
Dartmouth ‍‍‍	8	–	4	–	0	.667	15	–	9	–	0	.625
Harvard ‍‍‍	8	–	4	–	0	.667	13	–	14	–	1	.482
Penn ‍‍‍	6	–	6	–	0	.500	10	–	8	–	0	.556
Columbia ‍‍‍	5	–	7	–	0	.417	6	–	10	–	0	.375
Princeton ‍‍‍	4	–	8	–	0	.333	15	–	14	–	1	.517
Cornell ‍‍‍	2	–	10	–	0	.167	4	–	15	–	0	.211
† – Conference champion
