= 1938 NCAA baseball season =

Baseball season

Seasons
- ← 1937 1939 →

The 1938 NCAA baseball season, play of college baseball in the United States organized by the National Collegiate Athletic Association (NCAA) began in the spring of 1938. Play largely consisted of regional matchups, some organized by conferences, and ended in June. No national championship event was held until 1947.

== Conference winners ==
This is a partial list of conference champions from the 1938 season.

Conference	Regular season winner
Big Nine	Indiana/Iowa
Big Six	Missouri
CIBA	California
EIBL	Dartmouth
New England Conference	Maine
Pacific Coast Conference North	Oregon State
Southeastern Conference	Alabama
Southwest Conference	Texas

== Conference standings ==
The following is an incomplete list of conference standings:

1938 Eastern Intercollegiate Baseball League baseball standings
	Conf.				Overall
Team	W		L	PCT	W		L	PCT
Dartmouth ‍†‍‍	9	–	3	.750	16	–	9	.640
Harvard ‍‍‍	8	–	4	.667	14	–	14	.500
Princeton ‍‍‍	7	–	5	.583	14	–	11	.560
Yale ‍‍‍	8	–	7	.533	14	–	14	.500
Cornell ‍‍‍	5	–	7	.417	6	–	14	.300
Columbia ‍‍‍	4	–	8	.333	5	–	12	.294
Penn ‍‍‍	3	–	9	.250	6	–	17	.261
† – Conference champion
