= California Intercollegiate Baseball Association =

The California Intercollegiate Baseball Association was a college baseball association that competed under the Pacific Coast Conference, much like a 'division' in modern-day college athletic conferences. The association was formed in 1927 by Southern California, California, Saint Mary's College of California, Santa Clara and Stanford. The CIBA lasted until 1966. Member schools also included at various times Loyola Marymount University, UCLA, Occidental College, Pepperdine University, UC Santa Barbara, the University of San Francisco, and Whittier College.

== Champions ==
- 1931: Stanford
- 1944: UCLA
- 1946: USC
- 1947: USC
- 1948: USC
- 1950: Stanford
- 1953: Stanford
- 1965: Stanford
- 1966: USC
