= Eastern Intercollegiate Baseball League =

American college athletic conference, 1930–1992

The Eastern Intercollegiate Baseball League was a baseball-only conference that existed from 1930 to 1992. It consisted of the eight Ivy League schools along with Army and Navy. The league disbanded after the 1992 season, when Army and Navy joined the Patriot League and the Ivy League began sponsoring baseball.

== Former members ==
Institution	Nickname	Year joined	Year departed	Division
Army	Black Knights	1947–48	1991–92	North
Brown	Bears	1947–48	1991–92	North
Columbia	Lions	1929–30	1991–92	South
Cornell	Big Red	1929–30	1991–92	South
Dartmouth	Big Green	1929–30	1991–92	North
Harvard	Crimson	1932–33	1991–92 (Note: Harvard did not participate in the EIBL from 1942–43 to 1945–46)	North
Navy	Midshipmen	1947–48	1991–92	South
Penn	Quakers	1929–30	1991–92	South
Princeton	Tigers	1929–30	1991–92	South
Yale	Bulldogs	1929–30	1991–92	North

== Champions ==
Year	Eastern Intercollegiate Baseball League Champion	Ivy Champion (Note: Beginning in 1956, if the EIBL champion was not an Ivy League member, the top finishing Ivy League member was declared the Ivy League Champion.)
1930	Dartmouth	
1931	Penn	
1932	Yale	
1933	Columbia	
1934	Columbia	
1935	Dartmouth	
1936	Dartmouth; Harvard	
1937	Yale	
1938	Dartmouth	
1939	Harvard; Cornell	
1940	Cornell	
1941	Princeton	
1942	Princeton	
1943	Penn	
1944	Columbia	
1945	Princeton	
1946	Yale	
1947	Yale	
1948	Dartmouth	
1949	Princeton	
1950	Army; Princeton	
1951	Princeton	
1952	North - Brown; South - Cornell	
1953	Princeton	
1954	Navy	
1955	Harvard	
1956	Yale	
1957	Yale	
1958	Harvard	
1959	Navy	Brown; Cornell; Dartmouth
1960	Army	Columbia
1961	Navy	Columbia
1962	Navy	Harvard
1963	Columbia; Dartmouth; Navy	
1964	Harvard	
1965	Army	Dartmouth
1966	Army	Dartmouth
1967	Dartmouth	
1968	Harvard	
1969	Dartmouth	
1970	Dartmouth	
1971	Harvard	
1972	Cornell; Harvard	
1973	Harvard	
1974	Harvard	
1975	Penn	
1976	Columbia	
1977	Cornell; Columbia	
1978	Harvard	
1979	Navy	Cornell
1980	Harvard	
1981	Yale	
1982	Navy	Cornell
1983	Harvard	
1984	Harvard	
1985	Harvard; Princeton	Princeton won Playoff
1986	Navy	Columbia
1987	Dartmouth	
1988	Penn	
1989	Penn	
1990	Penn	
1991	Princeton	
1992	Yale	
