= Carleton Wiggin =

American college coach (1897–1970)

Biographical details
- Born: July 29, 1897; Dover, New Hampshire, U.S.
- Died: May 15, 1970 (aged 72); Portland, Maine, U.S.
- Education: Bates College

Coaching career (HC unless noted)

Baseball
- 1923–1929: Bates
- 1930–1934: Wesleyan

Football
- 1922–1924: Bates (assistant)
- 1925–1928: Bates

Ice hockey
- 1922–1929: Bates

Head coaching record
- Overall: 70–100 (baseball); 6–20–2 (football); 37–33–4 (ice hockey)

Accomplishments and honors

Records
- Military career
- Burial place: Evergreen Cemetery
- Allegiance: United States
- Branch: United States Army
- Service years: 1918
- Rank: Private

Carleton Low Wiggin (July 29, 1897 – May 15, 1970) was an American college baseball, college football, and college ice hockey player and coach. He led all three programs at his alma mater, Bates College, during the 1920s.

== Career ==
While born in New Hampshire, Wiggin grew up in Maine and graduated from Sanford High School in 1915. He began attending Bates College in the fall of 1916 in the class of 1920. He was initially a member of both the varsity baseball and football teams though only played in a reserve capacity as a freshman. During his second year, Wiggin had his studies interrupted when the United States entered World War I. He joined the Student Army Training Corps along with nearly 170 other men and served until the armistice was signed on November 11. After returning to his studies, Wiggin resumed his place on his previous teams while also becoming the goaltender for the school's inaugural ice hockey squad and joining the varsity track team in 1920. He was elected captain of the baseball team as a junior and led the program for two seasons. "Wig" helped the baseball team win the state championship in 1920 and 1921. He also won the 100-yard dash at the Maine Intercollegiates meet in 11 seconds flat.

After graduating, Wiggin took a job as a submaster and coach at Portsmouth High School in New Hampshire. After a year there, he returned to his alma mater as an assistant physical director and coach of both the baseball and ice hockey programs. In 1922, Wiggin became an assistant football coach under Oliver Cutts. Following the 1924 season, Wiggin succeeded Cutts as head football coach. After the football team posted a winless record in 1928, the college announced that they would be releasing Wiggin from his responsibilities. A protest was held at his dismissal and over four hundred students marched to convey their displeasure. While their cries and petitions did help allow Wiggin to finish out the season for both the ice hockey and baseball teams, the school stood by its decision. On New Year's Day, Dave Morey was hired as the head coach for all three programs and was to begin his tenure the following fall. Knowing his time in Lewiston was coming to a close, Wiggin accepted the head coaching job for the baseball team at Wesleyan University, where he was also an assistant on the football team.

Wiggin helmed the Cardinals baseball team for five years but, after posting a losing record in each season, he was dismissed in 1934.

Wiggin died in 1970 at the age of 72.

== Head coaching record ==
=== Baseball ===
Record table
Season	Team	Overall	Conference	Standing	Postseason
Bates Bobcats (Independent) (1923–1929)
1923	Bates	4–7			
1924	Bates	7–10			
1925	Bates	9–7			
1926	Bates	4–11			
1927	Bates	6–7			
1928	Bates	8–5			
1929	Bates	11–6			
Bates:		49–53			
Wesleyan Cardinals (Independent) (1934–1929)
1930	Wesleyan	8–10			
1931	Wesleyan	6–7			
1932	Wesleyan	4–10			
1933	Wesleyan	0–11			
1934	Wesleyan	3–9			
Wesleyan:		21–47			
Total:		70–100			

=== Football ===
Year	Team	Overall	Conference	Standing	Bowl/playoffs
Bates Bobcats (Independent) (1925–1928)
1925	Bates	3–4			
1926	Bates	2–5			
1927	Bates	1–4–2			
1928	Bates	0–7			
Bates:		6–20–2			
Total:		6–20–2			

=== Ice hockey ===
Record table
Season	Team	Overall	Conference	Standing	Postseason
Bates Independent (1922–1924)
1922–23	Bates	8–4–0			State champion
1923–24	Bates	9–2–0			State champion
Bates Bobcats Independent (1924–1929)
1924–25	Bates	1–7–0			
1925–26	Bates	3–6–1			
1926–27	Bates	5–3–1			State champion
1927–28	Bates	6–5–1			
1928–29	Bates	5–6–1			
Bates:		37–33–4			
Total:		37–33–4			
