= Lawrence Haskell =

Biographical details
- Born: November 18, 1898; Butler County, Kansas, U.S.
- Died: February 10, 1964 (aged 65); Tulsa, Oklahoma, U.S.

Playing career
- 1921–1922: Oklahoma

Coaching career (HC unless noted)
- 1927–1941: Oklahoma

Administrative career (AD unless noted)
- 1941–1947: Oklahoma

Head coaching record
- Overall: 176–74–2

Accomplishments and honors

Championships
- 1 MVIAA; 7 Big Six

Lawrence E. "Jap" Haskell (November 18, 1898 – February 10, 1964) was an American university administrator, baseball coach, and football coach. He served as the head baseball coach at the University of Oklahoma from 1927 to 1941. During his tenure, the Sooners won 176 games and eight conference championships. In the military, Haskell was a lieutenant commander in the United States Navy during World War II.

Haskell was the University of Oklahoma athletic director from 1941 to 1947. The Board of Regents fired him on March 25, 1947 after university president George L. Cross discovered a $60,000 deficit and $6,000 of unknown expenditures in the athletic department budget. The misappropriation was during head football coach Jim Tatum's one-year tenure at Oklahoma.

He was listed as a scout for the Boston Red Sox of Major League Baseball in 1948.

== Head coaching record ==
Record table
Season	Team	Overall	Conference	Standing	Postseason
Oklahoma Sooners (Missouri Valley Intercollegiate Athletic Association) (1927–1928)
1927	Oklahoma	12–5	12–5		
1928	Oklahoma	7–9	4–4	4th	
Oklahoma Sooners (Big Six Conference) (1929–1941)
1929	Oklahoma	9–7–1	5–6	4th	
1930	Oklahoma	11–4–1	9–3–1	T–1st	
1931	Oklahoma	10–1	6–1	T–1st	
1932	Oklahoma	5–7	1–3	5th	
1933	Oklahoma	11–5	3–2	T–1st	
1934	Oklahoma	15–3	4–2		
1935	Oklahoma	14–3	7–0	1st	
1936	Oklahoma	18–3	6–0	T–1st	
1937	Oklahoma	13–5	6–1		
1938	Oklahoma	12–6	6–2	2nd	
1939	Oklahoma	14–5	9–1	1st	
1940	Oklahoma	16–5	9–1	1st	
1941	Oklahoma	9–6	6–2	2nd	
Oklahoma:		176–74–2 (.702)	89–29–1 (.752)		
Total:		176–74–2 (.702)			
National champion Postseason invitational champion Conference regular season champion Conference regular season and conference tournament champion Division regular season champion Division regular season and conference tournament champion Conference tournament champion
