= Ward Lambert =

American basketball and baseball coach

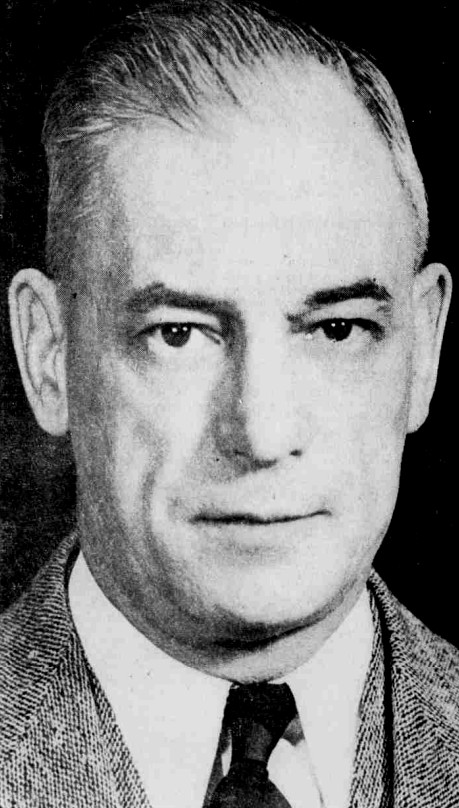

Biographical details
- Born: May 28, 1888; Deadwood, Dakota Territory, U.S.
- Died: January 20, 1958 (aged 69); Lafayette, Indiana, U.S.

Playing career

Football
- 1909: Wabash

Basketball
- 1909–1911: Wabash

Baseball
- c. 1910: Wabash
- Positions: Guard (basketball); Shortstop (baseball)

Coaching career (HC unless noted)

Basketball
- 1912–1916: Lebanon HS
- 1916–1917: Purdue
- 1918–1946: Purdue

Baseball
- 1917: Purdue
- 1919–1935: Purdue
- 1945–1946: Purdue

Administrative career (AD unless noted)
- 1946–1949: NBL (commissioner)

Head coaching record
- Overall: 371–152 (college basketball); 163–158–7 (college baseball)

Accomplishments and honors

Championships
- Basketball; Helms Athletic Foundation National (1932); 11× Big Ten
- Basketball Hall of Fame; Inducted in 1960 (profile)
- College Basketball Hall of Fame; Inducted in 2006

Ward Louis "Piggy" Lambert (May 28, 1888 – January 20, 1958) was an American basketball and baseball coach. He served as the head basketball coach at Purdue University during the 1916–17 season and from 1918 to 1946. Lambert was also the head baseball coach at Purdue in 1917, from 1919 to 1935, and from 1945 to 1946. He was inducted into the Naismith Memorial Basketball Hall of Fame in 1960.

== Early life and playing career ==
Lambert was born in Deadwood, South Dakota. In 1890, Lambert and his family moved to Crawfordsville, Indiana. He played basketball and baseball at Crawfordsville High School and Wabash College, both under coach Ralph Jones, who himself went on to coach Purdue in 1909. Football coach Jesse Harper took over as Lambert's basketball coach in 1910 following the departure of Ralph Jones. Despite his height (5'6"), Lambert led Wabash in scoring his sophomore year—leading to his nickname "Piggy" for hogging the ball. Another telling states that, while playing baseball at Wabash, Lambert used his position as shortstop to hog the ball. He graduated from Wabash College in 1911.

== Coaching career ==
Lambert began his coaching career at Lebanon High School from 1912 to 1916, amassing a record of 69–18 (.793) a Sectional title and 3 other post-season appearances; including a berth in the State Semi-Finals in 1913–14. Lambert coached Purdue University (1916–17, 1918–1946) to a 371–152 record in 29 seasons, including 11 Big Ten Conference titles. His teams were noted for their speed and effective use of fast breaks, which he developed. Among his players were Stretch Murphy and John Wooden. Lambert missed the 1917–18 season to serve in the United States Army during World War I. Meanwhile, J. J. Maloney, an attorney from Crawfordsville, Indiana, filled in and guided the Boilermakers to an 11–5 record. Lambert's 1931–32 team finished the season with a 17–1 record, was retroactively named the national champion by the Helms Athletic Foundation, and was retroactively listed as the top-ranked team of the season by the Premo-Porretta Power Poll. He coached 16 All-Americans and 31 first team All-Big Ten selections. Lambert Fieldhouse (originally known as Purdue Fieldhouse), the facility used for home basketball games prior to the construction of Mackey Arena, was renamed in his honor.

Lambert is now third on Purdue's all-time wins list behind Gene Keady and current head coach Matt Painter.

Lambert also coached Purdue's baseball team in 1917, from 1919 to 1935, and from 1945 to 1946. Lambert Field, Purdue's former baseball stadium, is also named for Lambert. He was listed as a scout for the New York Yankees of Major League Baseball in 1948.

== Administrative career, writing, and honors ==
Following his retirement from Purdue, he served as Commissioner of the National Basketball League during the final three years (1946–1949) of that league's tenure and was instrumental in its merger with the Basketball Association of America to form the National Basketball Association.

Lambert wrote Practical Basketball in 1932, one of the first "bibles" of the game. He was inducted into the Naismith Memorial Basketball Hall of Fame in 1960 and the National Collegiate Basketball Hall of Fame in 2006.

== Head coaching record ==
=== College basketball ===
Record table
Season	Team	Overall	Conference	Standing	Postseason
Purdue Boilermakers (Western Conference) (1916–1917)
1916–17	Purdue	11–3	7–2	3rd	
Purdue Boilermakers (Big Ten Conference) (1918–1946)
1918–19	Purdue	6–8	4–7	T–7th	
1919–20	Purdue	16–4	8–2	2nd	
1920–21	Purdue	13–7	8–4	T–1st	
1921–22	Purdue	15–3	8–1	1st	
1922–23	Purdue	9–6	7–5	T–4th	
1923–24	Purdue	12–5	7–5	T–4th	
1924–25	Purdue	9–5	7–4	4th	
1925–26	Purdue	13–4	8–4	T–1st	
1926–27	Purdue	12–5	9–3	T–2nd	
1927–28	Purdue	15–2	10–2	1st	
1928–29	Purdue	13–4	9–3	3rd	
1929–30	Purdue	13–2	10–0	1st	
1930–31	Purdue	12–5	8–4	T–2nd	
1931–32	Purdue	17–1	11–1	1st	Helms National Champion
1932–33	Purdue	11–7	6–6	T–5th	
1933–34	Purdue	17–3	10–2	1st	
1934–35	Purdue	17–3	9–3	T–1st	
1935–36	Purdue	16–4	11–1	T–1st	
1936–37	Purdue	15–5	8–4	4th	
1937–38	Purdue	18–2	10–2	1st	
1938–39	Purdue	12–7	6–6	5th	
1939–40	Purdue	16–4	10–2	1st	
1940–41	Purdue	13–7	6–6	6th	
1941–42	Purdue	14–7	9–6	T–5th	
1942–43	Purdue	9–11	6–6	T–4th	
1943–44	Purdue	11–10	8–4	T–4th	
1944–45	Purdue	9–11	6–6	4th	
1945–46	Purdue	10–11	4–8	8th	
Purdue:		374–156 (.706)	223–105 (.680)		
Total:		374–156 (.706)			
National champion Postseason invitational champion Conference regular season champion Conference regular season and conference tournament champion Division regular season champion Division regular season and conference tournament champion Conference tournament champion

=== College baseball ===
Record table
Season	Team	Overall	Conference	Standing
Purdue Boilermakers (Big Ten Conference) (1917, 1919–1935, 1945–1946)
1917	Purdue	5–7	3–5	6th
1919	Purdue	3–9	0–7	8th
1920	Purdue	6–10–1	2–9–1	6th
1921	Purdue	10–11	4–7	6th
1922	Purdue	12–10	7–5	4th
1923	Purdue	9–8	6–5	5th
1924	Purdue	9–7	5–5	6th
1925	Purdue	5–11	1–9	10th
1926	Purdue	11–4–2	7–4–1	T-3rd
1927	Purdue	9–5–1	5–5	T-4th
1928	Purdue	10–4	6–4	2nd
1929	Purdue	10–8	4–6	T-6th
1930	Purdue	7–9	3–7	T-7th
1931	Purdue	3–7	0–5	10th
1932	Purdue	8–5	6–4	T-3rd
1933	Purdue	6–6–1	4–3	6th
1934	Purdue	9–6–2	4–5–1	7th
1935	Purdue	12–13	3–9	10th
1945	Purdue	9–12	3–10	9th
1946	Purdue	10–6	2–4	7th
Purdue:		163–158–7	75–118–3	
Total:		163–158–7		
