= Fred Brice =

American football, basketball, and baseball coach

- Brice pictured in The Prism 1939, Maine yearbook

Biographical details
- Born: December 6, 1887; Lawrence, Massachusetts, U.S.
- Died: January 10, 1967 (aged 79); Pittsfield, New Hampshire, U.S.
- Education: Boston School of Optometry

Coaching career (HC unless noted)

Football
- 1908-1910: Pinkerton Academy
- 1911–1920: Manchester Central (NH)
- 1921–1940: Maine

Basketball
- 1925–1929: Maine

Baseball
- 1926–1935: Maine

Head coaching record
- Overall: 79–58–9 (football); 14–31 (basketball); 67–60 (baseball)

Accomplishments and honors

Championships
- Football; 10 Maine Intercollegiate Athletic Association (1922, 1924–1928, 1931–1934); Baseball; 5 Maine State Series (1926, 1927, 1930–1932)

Fred Mansfield Brice (December 6, 1887 – January 10, 1967) was an American football, basketball, and baseball coach.

== Early life ==
Brice was born in Lawrence, Massachusetts and was raised in Manchester, New Hampshire. He graduated from the Boston School of Optometry in 1908 and divided his time between coaching and optometry until he suffered a gas attack during World War I, which led to his doctors recommending he spend more time outside.

== Coaching ==
Brice began his career at the Pinkerton Academy. He then moved to his alma mater, Manchester High School Central, where he won ten state championships. Brice served as the head football coach at the University of Maine from 1921 to 1940, compiling a record of 79–58–9 and winning 10 Maine Intercollegiate Athletic Association championships. He was known for his use of trick plays. He was crediting with creating the triple pass from the single-wing formation and was credited with being the first coach in the eastern United States to used the spinner play and hidden ball trick. He is the "Brice" in the name of the rivalry game with the New Hampshire Wildcats, the Battle for the Brice-Cowell Musket. Brice was also the head basketball coach at Maine from 1925 to 1929, tallying a mark of 14–31, and the school's head baseball coach from 1926 to 1935, amassing a record of 67–60. He retired on December 17, 1940.

== Later life ==
Brice died at the age of 79 on January 10, 1967, at his home in Pittsfield, New Hampshire.

== Head coaching record ==
=== Football ===
Year	Team	Overall	Conference	Standing	Bowl/playoffs
Maine Black Bears (Maine Intercollegiate Athletic Association) (1921–1940)
1921	Maine	2–5–1	0–2–1		
1922	Maine	6–2	3–0	1st	
Maine:		8–7–1	3–2–1		
Maine Black Bears (New England Conference / Maine Intercollegiate Athletic Association) (1923–1940)
1923	Maine	5–3	3–0 / 2–1	1st /	
1924	Maine	4–3–1	1–2 / 2–0–1	3rd / 1st	
1925	Maine	5–2–1	1–0–1 / 3–0	2nd / 1st	
1926	Maine	7–1	2–1 / 3–0	T–2nd / 1st	
1927	Maine	6–1	3–0 / 2–1	1st /	
1928	Maine	4–1–2	2–0–1 / 2–0–1	T–1st / T–1st	
1929	Maine	2–5	1–2 / 1–2	T–3rd /	
1930	Maine	3–4	2–1 / 1–2	2nd /	
1931	Maine	4–3	1–2 / 3–0	3rd / 1st	
1932	Maine	5–1–1	2–0–1 / 3–0	1st / 1st	
1933	Maine	4–3	0–2 / 3–0	4th / 1st	
1934	Maine	4–3	0–2 / 3–0	4th / 1st	
1935	Maine	3–3–1	2–0 / 0–2–1	1st /	
1936	Maine	4–3	1–1 / 2–1	2nd / 2nd	
1937	Maine	2–3–2	0–1–1 / 1–1–1	3rd /	
1938	Maine	3–4	2–1 / 1–2	2nd /	
1939	Maine	5–2	3–0 / 1–2	1st /	
1940	Maine	1–6	1–2 / 0–3	T–3rd / 4th	
Maine:		79–58–9	27–17–4 (New England); 36–19–5 (MIAA)		
Total:		79–58–9			
National championship Conference title Conference division title or championship game berth

=== Baseball ===
Below is a table of Brice's records as a collegiate head baseball coach.

Record table
Season	Team	Overall	Conference	Standing	Postseason
Maine Black Bears (1926–1935)
1926	Maine	6–5			
1927	Maine	7–4			
1928	Maine	3–9			
1929	Maine	8–6			
1930	Maine	8–7			
1931	Maine	7–6			
1932	Maine	9–5			
1933	Maine	7–5			
1934	Maine	5–7			
1935	Maine	7–6			
Total:		67–60			
National champion Postseason invitational champion Conference regular season champion Conference regular season and conference tournament champion Division regular season champion Division regular season and conference tournament champion Conference tournament champion
