= Billy Disch =

Baseball player and coach (1872–1953)

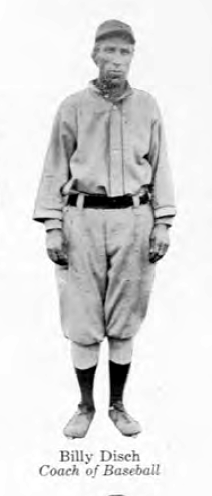
- Disch in 1915

Biographical details
- Born: October 15, 1872; Benton County, Missouri, U.S.
- Died: February 3, 1953 (aged 80); Austin, Texas, U.S.

Coaching career (HC unless noted)

Baseball
- 1902–1908: St. Edward's
- 1911–1939: Texas

Football
- c. 1902: St. Edward's
- 1910: St. Edward's

Head coaching record
- Overall: 515–140–12 (baseball)

Accomplishments and honors

Championships
- Baseball; 2 TIAA (1913–1914); 20 SWC regular season (1915–1921, 1922, 1924–1930, 1932, 1935–1936, 1938–1939)
- College Baseball Hall of Fame; Inducted in 2008

William John Disch (October 15, 1872 – February 3, 1953) was an American baseball player and coach. He served as the head baseball coach at the University of Texas at Austin from 1911 to 1939 and as an advisory coach for 12 seasons afterwards.

== Career ==
Often called the Connie Mack of college baseball, Disch earned a 513–180–12 overall record at Texas, including a collegiate record of 465-115-9, and garnered 20 Southwest Conference titles with a conference record of 284-70-4. At the time he coached, there were no NCAA postseason playoffs for national honors. Along with Bibb Falk, Disch is one of the two namesakes of UFCU Disch–Falk Field.

Disch managed in minor league baseball, where he also was a player. He managed the 1911 Beeville Orange Growers to a 63–54 record and the Class D level Southwest Texas League championship. Disch also managed the 1903 Fort Worth Panthers of the Class D level Texas League and the 1915 Brenham Huskies of the Class D Middle Texas League for portions of their seasons.

He was listed as a scout for the Boston Red Sox of Major League Baseball in 1948.

== Honors ==
- In 1947, Disch Field, the home to Austin's minor league teams (Austin Pioneers, 1947-1955; Austin Senators, 1956-1965; Austin Braves, 1966-1967) was named for him. Today, the University of Texas ballpark, UFCU Disch–Falk Field, is named for Disch and Bibb A. Falk.
- Disch was inducted into the Texas Sports Hall of Fame in 1954.
- In 1957, Disch was inducted into the Longhorn Hall of Honor at the University of Texas.
- The College Baseball Coaches Association Hall of Fame inducted Disch in 1965.

== Head coaching record ==
=== College baseball ===
The records shown below are only the collegiate record, not the overall record against non-collegiate teams.

Record table
Season	Team	Overall	Conference	Standing	Postseason
St. Edward's (Independent) (1902–1908)
1902	St. Edward's	4–2			
1903	St. Edward's	3–0			
1904	St. Edward's	17–4			
1905	St. Edward's	7–7			
1906	St. Edward's	5–9			
1907	St. Edward's	9–2			
1908	St. Edward's	5–1–3			
St. Edward's:		50–25–3 (.660)			
Texas Longhorns (Texas Intercollegiate Athletic Association) (1911–1914)
1911	Texas	13–10–1			
1912	Texas	17–7–1			
1913	Texas	24–4–2		1st	
1914	Texas	28–4		1st	
Texas Longhorns (Southwest Conference) (1915–1939)
1915	Texas	22–4	12–2	1st	
1916	Texas	16–6	10–3	1st	
1917	Texas	12–2	4–1	1st	
1918	Texas	17–1	8–1	1st	
1919	Texas	20–1–1	12–0	1st	
1920	Texas	17–5	9–2	1st	
1921	Texas	15–3–1	9–2–1	1st	
1922	Texas	16–5–1	10–3–1	1st	
1923	Texas	16–8	10–8	2nd	
1924	Texas	28–1	22–1	1st	
1925	Texas	16–4–1	11–2–1	1st	
1926	Texas	13–2	8–2	1st	
1927	Texas	16–4	16–4	1st	
1928	Texas	17–4	16–4	1st	
1929	Texas	18–4–1	16–4–1	1st	
1930	Texas	20–4	16–4	1st	
1931	Texas	10–2	8–2	2nd	
1932	Texas	11–5	11–5	1st	
1933	Texas	13–3	8–2	2nd	
1934	Texas	8–5	7–5	2nd	
1935	Texas	11–3	9–3	1st	
1936	Texas	12–2	12–1	1st	
1937	Texas	11–6	10–5	2nd	
1938	Texas	12–4	12–2	1st	
1939	Texas	16–2	15–0	1st	
Texas:		465–115–9 (.797)	284–70–4 (.799)		
Total:		515–140–12 (.781)			
National champion Postseason invitational champion Conference regular season champion Conference regular season and conference tournament champion Division regular season champion Division regular season and conference tournament champion Conference tournament champion
