= Lorin Ball =

American baseball, basketball, and ice hockey coach (1898–1969)

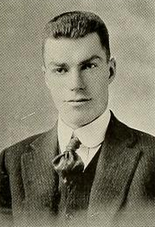

Biographical details
- Born: October 23, 1898; Amherst, Massachusetts, U.S.
- Died: October 21, 1969 (aged 70); Northampton, Massachusetts, U.S.

Playing career

Basketball
- c. 1920: Massachusetts

Baseball
- c. 1920: Massachusetts
- Position: Left fielder (baseball)

Coaching career (HC unless noted)

Basketball
- 1921–1925: Massachusetts (freshmen)
- 1946–1952: Massachusetts

Baseball
- 1922–1924: Massachusett (freshmen)
- 1925–1931: Massachusetts

Ice hockey
- 1924–1939: Massachusetts

Head coaching record
- Overall: 26–74 (basketball); 35–57–2 (baseball); 47–61–7 (ice hockey)

Lorin Earl "Red" Ball (October 23, 1898 – October 21, 1969) was an American baseball, basketball and ice hockey player and coach. He led all three programs at his alma mater University of Massachusetts Amherst at various times during his 40-year tenure at the university.

== Early life, education, and playing career ==
Born and raised in Amherst, Massachusetts, Ball graduated from Amherst High School in 1916 and began attending Massachusetts Agricultural College (later the University of Massachusetts Amherst) the following fall. From the start, Ball was involved with many of the school's sports teams, playing on class teams in baseball, basketball, football and ice hockey. Ball joined the varsity baseball and basketball teams as an upperclassman and was remained with the two until his graduation. Though originally a member of the class of 1920, Ball took a year off after his junior season and returned to finish his degree in 1921. After receiving a bachelor's in agricultural education, Ball was hired by the school's athletic department to coach the freshman baseball and basketball teams. While working in that capacity, he filled up his free time by working at various camps and sports academies.

== Coaching career ==
In 1924, Ball agreed to take over as the head coach for the ice hockey team, despite playing just a few games on the freshman class team. After pulling double-duty with the freshman basketball and varsity ice hockey teams, Ball was promoted to varsity baseball coach as well. Now a full-time faculty member, Ball decided that his commitment to the varsity teams was too great and had to end his tenure as freshman basketball coach. Over the next six years, he coached the baseball and hockey teams. on the field, his teams never produced a winning record, though some came close, and he agreed to step down after the 1931 season. On the ice, however, Ball found more success. Though his tenue got off to a rough start, (including a winless season in 1928), Ball's hockey teams produced five consecutive winning seasons in the early 30's. Due primarily to the lack of a permanent, enclosed home rink, the team could not sustain that level of play and the latter half of the decade was mired in subpar records and shortened seasons. With no home venue on the horizon, the hockey program was shuttered in 1939.

After the suspension of the hockey program, Ball remained at the school as an instructor of Physical Education and eventually found his way back to the basketball team. After World War II, Ball took over as head coach on the court and remained in that position until 1952. Similar to his stint with the baseball team, none of basketball teams finished with a winning record. While coaching basketball, Ball was promoted to assistant professor of physical education and also worked part time as an assistant on the varsity football team. Ball retired in 1954 but remained at the school as an emeritus professor afterwards.

== Death ==
Ball died on October 21, 1969, of a heart attack, at Cooley Dickinson Hospital in Northampton, Massachusetts. He was buried at Wildwood Cemetery in Amherst.

== Head coaching record ==
=== Basketball ===
Record table
Season	Team	Overall	Conference	Standing	Postseason
Massachusetts State Aggies (Independent) (1945–1946)
1945–46	Massachusetts State	4–8			
Massachusetts State Aggies / UMass Redmen (Yankee Conference) (1946–1953)
1946–47	UMass	4–5 ^{†}			
1947–48	UMass	2–14			
1948–49	UMass	6–12	2–2		
1949–50	UMass	8–11	2–3		
1950–51	UMass	6–14	1–3		
1951–52	UMass	4–17	0–6		
Massachusetts:		26–74			
Total:		26–74			

† Ball finished the year after Hargesheimer began the season 0–7.

=== Baseball ===
Record table
Season	Team	Overall	Conference	Standing	Postseason
Massachusetts Aggies (Independent) (1925–1931)
1925	Massachusetts	6–8–2			
1926	Massachusetts	4–12			
1927	Massachusetts	7–8			
1928	Massachusetts	2–9			
1929	Massachusetts	3–11			
1930	Massachusetts	7–9			
1931	Massachusetts	6–10			
Massachusetts:		35–57–2			
Total:		35–57–2			

=== Ice hockey ===
Record table
Season	Team	Overall	Conference	Standing	Postseason
Massachusetts Agricultural Aggies Independent (1924–1931)
1924–25	Massachusetts Agricultural	2–5–0			
1925–26	Massachusetts Agricultural	3–4–1			
1926–27	Massachusetts Agricultural	2–4–1			
1927–28	Massachusetts Agricultural	0–6–0			
1928–29	Massachusetts Agricultural	7–5–0			
1929–30	Massachusetts Agricultural	7–4–0			
1930–31	Massachusetts Agricultural	9–4–0			
Massachusetts State Aggies Independent (1931–1939)
1931–32	Massachusetts State	3–1–0			
1932–33	Massachusetts State	5–2–1			
1933–34	Massachusetts State	0–8–0			
1934–35	Massachusetts State	3–3–1			
1935–36	Massachusetts State	1–4–1			
1936–37	Massachusetts State	3–3–0			
1937–38	Massachusetts State	2–4–1			
1938–39	Massachusetts State	0–4–1			
Massachusetts State:		47–61–7			
Total:		47–61–7			
