= Brady Cowell =

American college sports coach and athletic director (1899–1989)

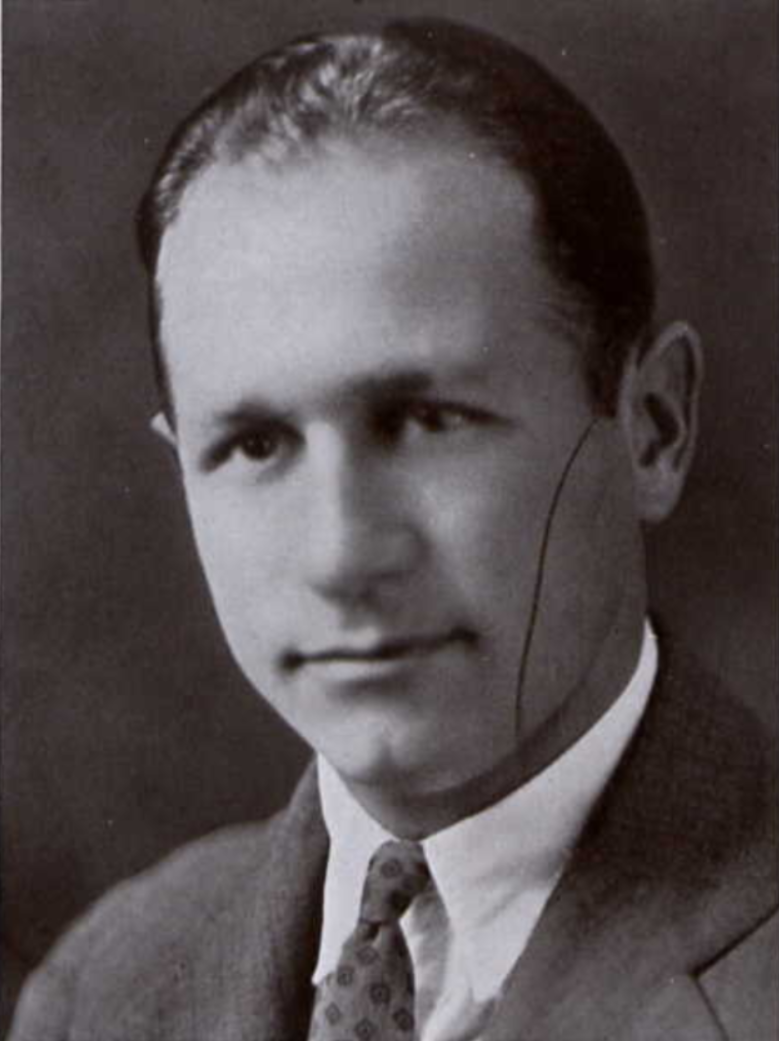
- Cowell from 1931 Seminole yearbook

Biographical details
- Born: December 5, 1899; Clay Center, Kansas, U.S.
- Died: April 15, 1989 (aged 89); DeLand, Florida, U.S.

Playing career

Football
- 1919–1921: Kansas State Agricultural

Basketball
- 1920–1922: Kansas State Agricultural

Baseball
- 1920–1922: Kansas State Agricultural

Coaching career (HC unless noted)

Football
- 1924–1927: Florida (freshmen)
- 1928–1932: Florida (assistant)
- 1935–1948: Stetson

Basketball
- 1925–1933: Florida
- 1938–1939: Stetson
- 1941–1942: Stetson
- 1945–1946: Stetson

Baseball
- 1927–1933: Florida

Administrative career (AD unless noted)
- 1935–1968: Stetson

Head coaching record
- Overall: 33–40–7 (football); 83–96 (basketball); 61–65–2 (baseball)

Warren C. "Brady" Cowell (December 12, 1899 – April 15, 1989) was an American college football, basketball, and baseball coach and college athletic director. Cowell played football, basketball and baseball at Kansas State Agricultural College, and later served as the basketball and baseball head coach at the University of Florida, and the football and basketball head coach and athletic director at Stetson University.

== Early years ==
Cowell was born in Clay Center, Kansas in 1899 and served in the United States Army during World War I. He attended Kansas State Agricultural College, where he lettered in football, basketball, and baseball before graduating in 1922.

== Coaching career ==
After graduating from Kansas State, Cowell coached for two years at Iola High School in Iola, Kansas. In 1924, he moved on to the University of Florida in Gainesville, Florida, where he accepted a position as the head coach for the freshman Florida Gators football team, and later as an assistant coach for the Gators varsity from 1928 to 1932. Cowell served as the head coach of the Florida Gators basketball team from 1925 to 1933, compiling an eight-season win–loss record of 83–96. He also coached the Florida Gators baseball team from 1927 to 1933, tallying a seven-season record of 61–65–2.

Cowell served as the athletic director and head football coach at Stetson University in DeLand, Florida from 1935 to 1948, leading the Stetson Hatters to a record of 32–40–7; Stetson did not field a team from 1941 to 1945 due to World War II. Cowell was also the head coach of the Stetson Hatters basketball team for three one-season stints (1938–39, 1941–42, 1945–46), amassing a career college basketball record of 83–96.

== Life after coaching ==
Cowell quit coaching after the 1948 football season, but remained Stetson's athletic director until his retirement in 1968. He died on April 15, 1989, at his home in DeLand, Florida.

== Head coaching record ==
=== Football ===
Year	Team	Overall	Conference	Standing	Bowl/playoffs
Stetson Hatters (Southern Intercollegiate Athletic Association) (1935–1940)
1935	Stetson	8–2	4–1	T–9th	
1936	Stetson	2–5–1	0–3–1	T–27th	
1937	Stetson	5–4	2–3	T–16th	
1938	Stetson	6–2–1	4–2–1	T–13th	
1939	Stetson	3–5–2	2–4–2	24th	
1940	Stetson	2–5–1	2–5–1	24th	
Stetson Hatters (Independent) (1946–1947)
1946	Stetson	3–4–1			
1947	Stetson	2–6–1			
Stetson Hatters (Dixie Conference) (1948)
1948	Stetson	2–7	1–3	4th	
Stetson:		33–40–7	15–21–5		
Total:		33–40–7			

=== Baseball ===
Record table
Season	Team	Overall	Conference	Standing	Postseason
Florida Gators (Southern Conference) (1927–1932)
1927	Florida	8–14			
1928	Florida	6–14–1			
1929	Florida	4–9			
1930	Florida	9–8			
1931	Florida	11–10			
1932	Florida	12–8			
Florida Gators (Southeastern Conference) (1933)
1933	Florida	11–2–1			
Florida:		61–65–2			
Total:		61–65–2			
