= List of Florida Gators men's basketball head coaches =

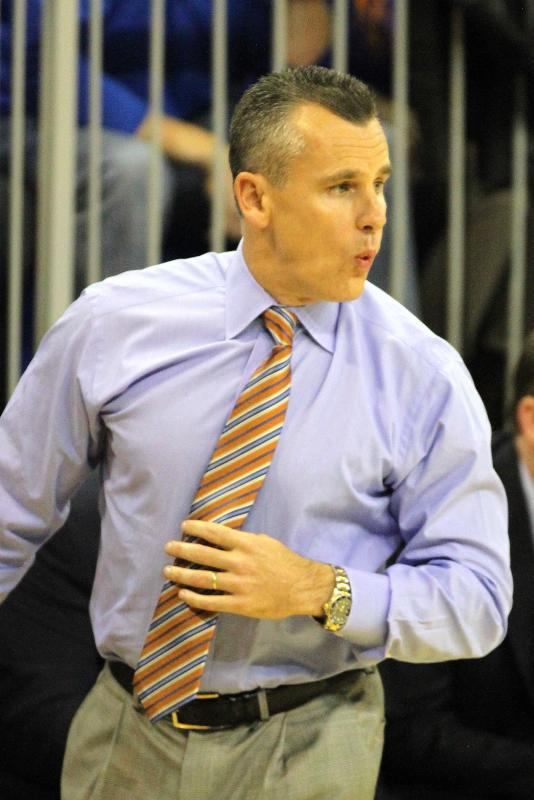
Billy Donovan, the winningest head coach in Gators men's basketball history

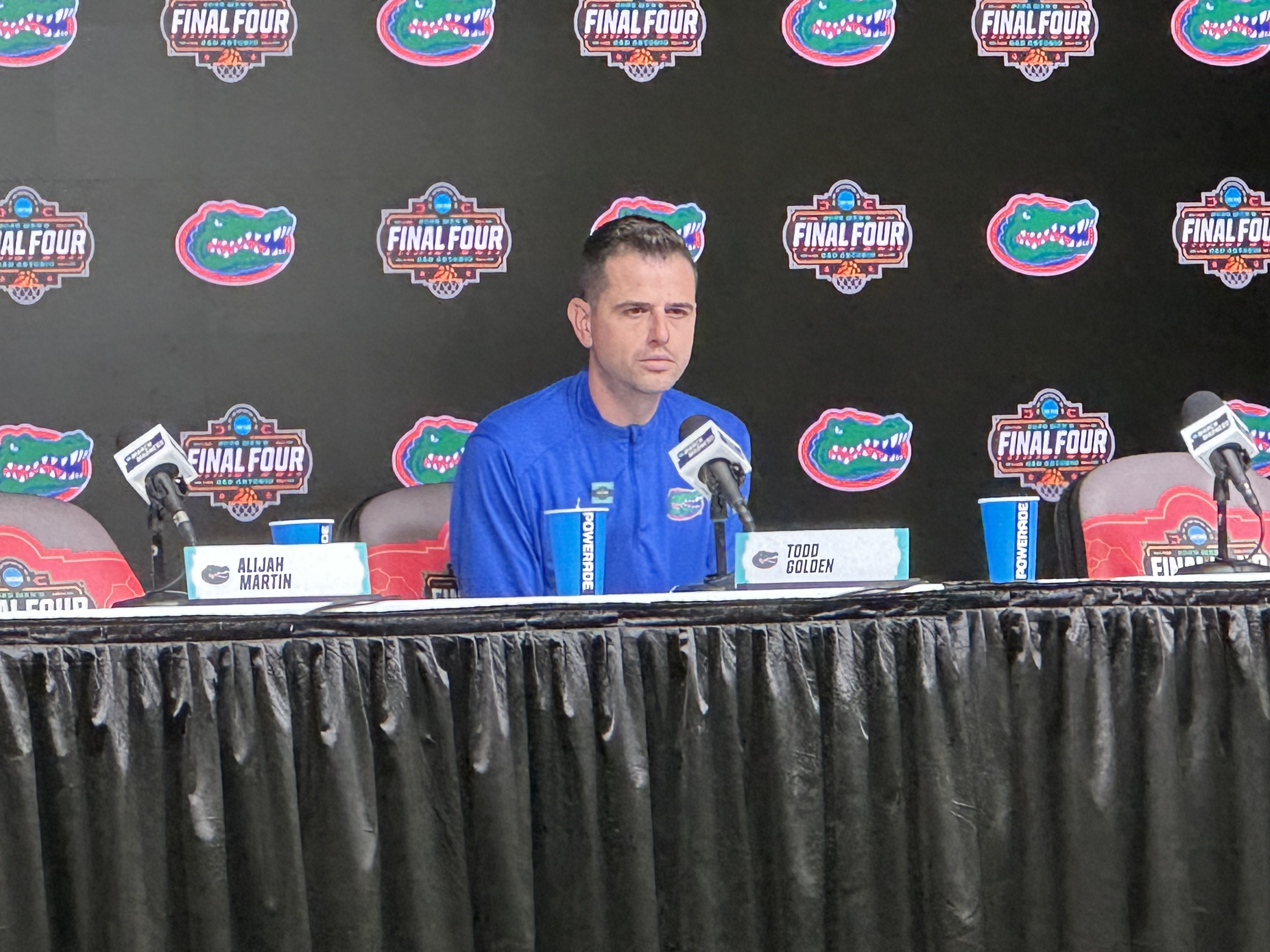
Todd Golden led Florida to its third national championship in program history in 2025.

The following is a list of Florida Gators men's basketball head coaches. There have been 20 head coaches of the Gators in their 110-year history.

Florida's current head coach is Todd Golden. He was hired as the Gators' head coach in March 2022, replacing Mike White, who left to become the head coach at Georgia.

No.	Tenure	Coach	Years	Record	Pct.
1	1915–1916	C. J. McCoy	1	5–1	.833
–	1919–1920	No coach	1	2–5	.286
2	1920–1922	William G. Kline	2	10–11	.476
3	1922–1923	Check Byrd	1	2–5	.286
4	1923–1925	James L. White	2	7–17	.292
5	1925–1933	Brady Cowell	8	62–86	.419
6	1933–1936	Ben Clemons	3	23–25	.479
7	1936–1937	Josh Cody	1	5–13	.278
8	1937–1942; 1946–1951	Sam J. McAllister	5	119–96	.553
9	1942–1946 (Note: Florida did not field a team for the 1943–44 season.)	Spurgeon Cherry	3	22–33	.400
10	1951–1960	John Mauer	9	98–102	.490
11	1960–1966; 1980–1989	Norm Sloan	15	232–192	.547
12	1966–1973	Tommy Bartlett	7	95–85	.528
13	1973–1980 (Note: Lotz was fired after 11 games in the 1979–80 season. Visscher was named interim coach for the remainder of the season.)	John Lotz	7	83–88	.485
14	1980*	Ed Visscher	1	3–14	.176
15	1989–1990* (Note: Sloan retired on October 31, 1989. DeVoe was named interim coach for the 1989–90 season.)	Don DeVoe	1	7–21	.250
16	1990–1996	Lon Kruger	6	104–80	.565
17	1996–2015	Billy Donovan	19	467–186	.715
18	2015–2022 (Note: White left to become the head coach at Georgia prior to the NIT. Pinkins was named interim coach for the remainder of the season.)	Mike White	7	142–88	.617
19	2022*	Al Pinkins	1	1–1	.500
20	2022–present	Todd Golden	4	103–41	.715
Totals		20 coaches	106 seasons	1,565–1,182	.570
Records updated through end of 2024–25 season * - Denotes interim head coach. Source

== See also ==
- List of Florida Gators men's basketball seasons
