= List of Florida Gators men's basketball seasons =

This is a list of seasons completed by the Florida Gators men's basketball team.

== Season-by-season results ==
Statistics overview
Season	Coach	Overall	Conference	Standing	Postseason
C. J. McCoy (Independent) (1915–1916)
1915–16	C.J. McCoy	5–1			
No coach (Independent) (1919–1920)
1919–20	No coach	2–5			
W.G. Kline (Independent) (1920–1922)
1920–21	W.G. Kline	5–6			
1921–22	W.G. Kline	5–5			
C.Y. Byrd (Southern Conference) (1922–1923)
1922–23	C.Y. Byrd	2–5	0–3	T–16th	
J.L. White (Southern Conference) (1923–1925)
1923–24	J.L. White	5–10	0–2	T–16th	
1924–25	J.L. White	2–7	0–0	T–20th	
Brady Cowell (Southern Conference) (1925–1932)
1925–26	Brady Cowell	7–7	0–3	22nd	
1926–27	Brady Cowell	6–20	1–8	20th	
1927–28	Brady Cowell	5–16	2–10	18th	
1928–29	Brady Cowell	7–13	4–11	19th	
1929–30	Brady Cowell	10–4	2–3	14th	
1930–31	Brady Cowell	10–9	5–7	14th	
1931–32	Brady Cowell	8–12	4–10	18th	
Brady Cowell (Southeastern Conference) (1932–1933)
1932–33	Brady Cowell	9–5	4–4	6th	
Ben Clemmons (Southeastern Conference) (1933–1936)
1933–34	Ben Clemmons	11–7	4–2	4th	
1934–35	Ben Clemmons	8–7	4–3	5th	
1935–36	Ben Clemmons	4–11	2–8	11th	
Josh Cody (Southeastern Conference) (1936–1937)
1936–37	Josh Cody	5–13	1–9	12th	
Sam McAllister (Southeastern Conference) (1937–1942)
1937–38	Sam McAllister	11–9	3–7	11th	
1938–39	Sam McAllister	9–6	5–4	7th	
1939–40	Sam McAllister	13–9	5–4	5th	
1940–41	Sam McAllister	15–3	6–2	2nd	
1941–42	Sam McAllister	8–9	3–8	9th	
Spurgeon Cherry (Southeastern Conference) (1942–1946)
1942–43	Spurgeon Cherry	8–7	0–6	12th	
1943–44	No team (WWII)				
1944–45	Spurgeon Cherry	7–12	4–2	4th	
1945–46	Spurgeon Cherry	7–14	2–6	10th	
Sam McAllister (Southeastern Conference) (1946–1951)
1946–47	Sam McAllister	17–9	4–4	6th	
1947–48	Sam McAllister	15–10	5–7	7th	
1948–49	Sam McAllister	11–15	4–8	9th	
1949–50	Sam McAllister	9–14	4–10	11th	
1950–51	Sam McAllister	11–12	6–8	8th	
John Mauer (Southeastern Conference) (1951–1960)
1951–52	John Mauer	15–9	7–7	7th	
1952–53	John Mauer	13–6	8–5	3rd	
1953–54	John Mauer	7–15	3–11	10th	
1954–55	John Mauer	12–10	5–9	9th	
1955–56	John Mauer	11–12	4–10	11th	
1956–57	John Mauer	14–10	6–8	8th	
1957–58	John Mauer	12–9	5–9	9th	
1958–59	John Mauer	8–15	2–12	11th	
1959–60	John Mauer	6–16	3–11	11th	
Norm Sloan (Southeastern Conference) (1960–1966)
1960–61	Norm Sloan	15–11	9–5	4th	
1961–62	Norm Sloan	12–11	8–6	4th	
1962–63	Norm Sloan	12–14	5–9	9th	
1963–64	Norm Sloan	12–10	6–8	9th	
1964–65	Norm Sloan	18–7	11–5	4th	
1965–66	Norm Sloan	16–10	9–7	5th	
Tommy Bartlett (Southeastern Conference) (1966–1973)
1966–67	Tommy Bartlett	21–4	14–4	2nd	
1967–68	Tommy Bartlett	15–10	11–7	5th	
1968–69	Tommy Bartlett	18–9	12–6	3rd	NIT First Round
1969–70	Tommy Bartlett	9–17	6–12	8th	
1970–71	Tommy Bartlett	11–15	8–10	7th	
1971–72	Tommy Bartlett	10–15	4–14	10th	
1972–73	Tommy Bartlett	11–15	7–11	7th	
John Lotz (Southeastern Conference) (1973–1980)
1973–74	John Lotz	15–11	9–9	5th	
1974–75	John Lotz	12–16	8–10	6th	
1975–76	John Lotz	12–14	7–11	6th	
1976–77	John Lotz	17–9	10–8	4th	
1977–78	John Lotz	15–12	8–10	6th	
1978–79	John Lotz	8–19	3–15	10th	
1979–80	John Lotz; Ed Visscher^{[Note A]}	7–21	2–16	10th	
Norm Sloan (Southeastern Conference) (1980–1989)
1980–81	Norm Sloan	12–16	5–13	8th	
1981–82	Norm Sloan	5–22	2–16	10th	
1982–83	Norm Sloan	13–18	5–13	10th	
1983–84	Norm Sloan	16–13	11–7	3rd	NIT First Round
1984–85	Norm Sloan	18–12	9–9	5th	NIT First Round
1985–86	Norm Sloan	19–14	10–8	4th	NIT Fourth Place
1986–87	Norm Sloan	23–11^{[Note B]}	12–6	2nd	NCAA Division I Sweet Sixteen
1987–88	Norm Sloan	23–12^{[Note C]}	11–7	T–2nd	NCAA Division I Round of 32
1988–89	Norm Sloan	21–13	13–5	1st	NCAA Division I Round of 64
Don DeVoe (Southeastern Conference) (1989–1990)
1989–90	Don DeVoe	7–21	3–15	10th	
Lon Kruger (Southeastern Conference) (1990–1996)
1990–91	Lon Kruger	11–17	7–11	6th	
1991–92	Lon Kruger	19–14	9–7	2nd (East)	NIT Fourth Place
1992–93	Lon Kruger	16–12	9–7	3rd (East)	NIT First Round
1993–94	Lon Kruger	29–8	12–4	T–1st (East)	NCAA Division I Final Four
1994–95	Lon Kruger	17–13	8–8	3rd (East)	NCAA Division I Round of 64
1995–96	Lon Kruger	12–16	6–10	T–5th (East)	
Billy Donovan (Southeastern Conference) (1996–2015)
1996–97	Billy Donovan	13–17	5–11	5th (East)	
1997–98	Billy Donovan	14–15	6–10	6th (East)	NIT First Round
1998–99	Billy Donovan	22–9	10–6	3rd (East)	NCAA Division I Sweet Sixteen
1999–00	Billy Donovan	29–8	12–4	T–1st (East)	NCAA Division I Runner-up
2000–01	Billy Donovan	24–7	12–4	T–1st (East)	NCAA Division I Round of 32
2001–02	Billy Donovan	22–9	10–6	T–1st (East)	NCAA Division I Round of 64
2002–03	Billy Donovan	25–8	12–4	2nd (East)	NCAA Division I Round of 32
2003–04	Billy Donovan	20–11	9–7	2nd (East)	NCAA Division I Round of 64
2004–05	Billy Donovan	24–8	12–4	2nd (East)	NCAA Division I Round of 32
2005–06	Billy Donovan	33–6	10–6	2nd (East)	NCAA Division I Champion
2006–07	Billy Donovan	35–5	13–3	1st (East)	NCAA Division I Champion
2007–08	Billy Donovan	24–12	8–8	4th (East)	NIT Semifinals
2008–09	Billy Donovan	25–11	9–7	3rd (East)	NIT Quarterfinals
2009–10	Billy Donovan	21–13	9–7	4th (East)	NCAA Division I Round of 64
2010–11	Billy Donovan	29–8	13–3	1st (East)	NCAA Division I Elite Eight
2011–12	Billy Donovan	26–11	10–6	T–2nd	NCAA Division I Elite Eight
2012–13	Billy Donovan	29–8	14–4	1st	NCAA Division I Elite Eight
2013–14	Billy Donovan	36–3	18–0	1st	NCAA Division I Final Four
2014–15	Billy Donovan	16–17	8–10	T–8th	
Mike White (Southeastern Conference) (2015–2022)
2015–16	Mike White	21–15	9–9	T–8th	NIT Quarterfinals
2016–17	Mike White	27–9	14–4	2nd	NCAA Division I Elite Eight
2017–18	Mike White	21–13	11–7	3rd	NCAA Division I Round of 32
2018–19	Mike White	20–16	9–9	8th	NCAA Division I Round of 32
2019–20	Mike White	19–12	11–7	T–4th	No postseason held
2020–21	Mike White	15–10	9–7	5th	NCAA Division I Round of 32
2021–22	Mike White; Al Pinkins^{[Note D]}	20–14	9–9	T–5th	NIT Second Round
Todd Golden (Southeastern Conference) (2022–present)
2022–23	Todd Golden	16–17	9–9	T–8th	NIT First Round
2023–24	Todd Golden	24–12	11–7	6th	NCAA Division I Round of 64
2024–25	Todd Golden	36–4	14-4	2nd	NCAA Division I Champion
2025–26	Todd Golden	27–8	16–2	1st	NCAA Division I Round of 32
Total:		1,595–1,192^{[Note E]}			
National champion Postseason invitational champion Conference regular season champion Conference regular season and conference tournament champion Division regular season champion Division regular season and conference tournament champion Conference tournament champion

^A. Ed Visscher served as interim head coach after John Lotz resigned during the season.
^B. Due to NCAA sanctions, the NCAA tournament results were vacated. The record for this season is officially recorded as 21-10.
^C. Due to NCAA sanctions, the NCAA tournament results were vacated. The record for this season is officially recorded as 22-11.
^D. Al Pinkins served as interim head coach for the NIT after Mike White left for Georgia.
^E. Due to vacated results in 1986–87 and 1987–88, the overall program record is officially 1,565–1,182.

== See also ==
- List of Florida Gators men's basketball head coaches
