= 1902 St. Edward's Hilltoppers baseball team =

American college baseball season

1902 St. Edward's Hilltoppers baseball
- Conference: Independent
- Record: 4-2
- Head coach: Billy Disch (1st season)

The 1902 St. Edward's Hilltoppers baseball team represented St. Edward's University in the 1902 baseball season. The team was coached by Billy Disch in his 1st year at St. Edward's.

== Roster ==
1902 St. Edward's Hilltoppers baseball team
Players
Coaches

| # | Pos. | Name | B/T | Height | Weight | Year | Home town |
|---|---|---|---|---|---|---|---|
| | | Oscar Beck | / | — | — | | Coleman, Texas |
| | | Leon Clark | / | — | — | | Nacogdoches, Texas |
| | | George Disch | / | — | — | | Wisconsin |
| | | Michael Gallagher | / | — | — |
| | | Patrick Gallagher | / | — | — |
| | | Richard Ilse | / | — | — | | Colorado County, Texas |
| | | James O'Connor | / | — | — | | Beeville, Texas |
| | | John Painter | / | — | — | | Fort Worth, Texas |
| | | Merle Simmons | / | — | — | | Dallas, Texas |
| | | Schoetzke | / | — | — |

Head coach

Billy Disch

Assistant coach(es)

Legend

- (C) Team captain
- (S) Suspended
- (I) Ineligible
- Injured
- Current redshirt

== Schedule ==
1902 St. Edward's Hilltoppers baseball game log
Regular season
February (3-1)

| # | Date | Opponent | Site/stadium | Score | Overall record |
|---|---|---|---|---|---|
| 1 | Feb 12 | Southwestern | Austin, Texas | L 3-7 | 0-1 |
| 2 | Feb 14 | Texas School for the Deaf | Austin, Texas | W 20-7 | 1-1 |
| 3 | Feb 22 | Texas | Austin, Texas | W 10-7 | 2-1 |
| 4 | Feb 26 | Texas School for the Deaf | Austin, Texas | W 14-3 | 3-1 |

March (1-1)

| # | Date | Opponent | Site/stadium | Score | Overall record |
|---|---|---|---|---|---|
| 5 | March 2 (Note: University of Texas lists this game as being played on April 9th.) | Texas | Austin, Texas | L 6-9 | 3-2 |
| 6 | March 5 | Texas School for the Deaf | Austin, Texas | W 12-5 | 4-2 |
