= Beeville Orange Growers =

- 1910–1977; (1910–1911, 1926, 1976–1977); Beeville, Texas

Minor league affiliations
- Class: Class D (1910–1911, 1926); Class A (1976–1977)
- League: Southwest Texas League (1910–1911); Gulf Coast League (1926); Gulf States League (1976); Lone Star League (1977)

Major league affiliations
- Team: None

Minor league titles
- League titles (1): 1911
- Conference titles (1): 1926
- Wild card berths (2): 1911; 1976

Team data
- Name: Beeville Orange Growers (1910–1911); Beeville Bees (1926, 1976); Beeville Blazers (1977)
- Ballpark: The Ball Park (1910–1911, 1926); Joe Hunter Field (1976–1977)

The Beeville Orange Growers were a minor league baseball team that was based in Beeville, Texas. The Beeville Orange Growers played exclusively as members of the Class D level Southwest Texas League in 1910 and 1911, capturing the 1911 league championship.

They were succeeded by the Beeville "Bees" who played in the 1926 Gulf Coast League, with the name revived for the 1976 Gulf States League team. The Beeville "Blaze" played as members of the 1977 Lone Star League.

== History ==
=== Southwest Texas League 1910–1911 ===
In 1910, Beeville began minor league play, when the Beeville "Orange Growers" became charter members of the Southwest Texas League, which began play as a six–team Class D level minor league. The Bay City Rice Eaters, Brownsville Brownies, Corpus Christi Pelicans, Laredo Bermudas and Victoria Rosebuds joined with Beeville as charter members in league play.

The Beeville use of the "Orange Growers" moniker corresponds to local industry. In the era in which the team played, Beeville, Texas had developed a citrus industry. However, the climate did not support the citrus industry long term and it soon died out.

In their first season of league play, Southwest Texas League games began on April 21, 1910. Beeville did not qualify for the Southwest Texas League playoffs in 1910, playing under managers Harry Longley and Francis Woessner. Victoria, who won the first–half pennant, had the league's best overall record at 72–45. Brownsville had the second-best overall record at 68–47, winning the second–half pennant. Both finished ahead of the third place Bay City Rice Eaters (59–56), followed by Laredo (54–61), Beeville (52–64) and Corpus Christi (42–74). In the 1910 Finals, the Brownsville Brownies defeated the Victoria Rosebuds.

In 1911, the Southwest Texas League played its final seasons Beeville and won the league championship playing under manager Billy Disch. After all six teams returned for the second season of league play, the Corpus Christi Pelicans folded on July 17, 1911, and the Victoria Rosebuds disbanded on August 11, 1911. With four teams finishing the regular season, the Bay City Rice Eaters won the first–half pennant and Beeville won the second–half title in the split season schedule. Bay City had the best overall record with a 67–51 record, followed by Brownsville, who finished 2.0 games behind with a 64–52 overall record, Beeville (63–54) and Laredo (55–63). Manager Billy Disch became the longtime baseball coach of the Texas Longhorns baseball team at the University of Texas, beginning in 1911. Today's UFCU Disch–Falk Field at the university is named in–part after Billy Disch.

Based on the split–season format, Beeville was scheduled to play Bay City in the 1911 Southwest Texas League Finals. It was reported that the league wanted to retrieve the 1910 championship trophy from Brownsville to reuse for the 1911 finals, but Brownsville refused to part with the trophy. The 1911 Finals Southwest Texas League were not held, as the Beeville Orange Growers were awarded the Championship after Bay City refused to play in the finals. It was reported that Bay City was concerned about Beeville fan behavior based on earlier incidents. The league permanently folded after the 1911 season.

=== Gulf Coast League 1926 ===
Beeville was without minor league baseball until 1926, when the Beeville Bees played a partial 1926 season as members of the Class D level Gulf Coast League. Beginning the season in Beeville, the franchise relocated on May 26, 1926, with a 4–7 record to become the Laredo Oilers. The Beeville/Laredo team won the pennant with a 59–41 record after the team relocated. Beeville/Laredo finished 7.5 games ahead of the second place Victoria Rosebuds in the four–team league, managed by Emmett Rose and E.C. Newberry. In the playoff final, Victoria Rosebuds/Edinburg Bobcats defeated the Beeville Bees/Laredo Oilers 4 games to 3. The Gulf Coast League folded after the 1926 season.

=== Gulf States League 1976 ===
After a 50-year hiatus, minor league baseball returned to Beeville in 1976. The Beeville Bees became members of the six-team Class A level Gulf States League. Playing under manager Bob Leach, the Bees finished last in the six–team league. With a record of 33–53, Beeville placed sixth and finished 21.5 games behind the first place Corpus Christi Seagulls in the final standings. In the playoffs, the Seguin Toros swept the Beeville Bees in two games.

=== Lone Star League 1977 ===
The Gulf States League changed names for the 1977 season, as did the Beeville team, which played its final season. The Beeville Blazers played as members of the Class A level Lone Star League. The Blazers finished the season with a record of 37–43, playing under manager Bill Bryk. Beeville placed fourth in the final standings, finishing 16.0 games behind the first place Corpus Christi Seagulls in the six–team league. Beeville drew 7,150 fans for the year, a distant last in the league that was led by Corpus Christi, who drew 92,137. The Lone Star League permanently folded following the 1977 season.

Beeville, Texas has not hosted another minor league team.

== The ballparks ==
The 1910, 1911 and 1926 Beeville teams are noted as playing minor league games at "The Ball Park" in Beeville, Texas.

The 1976 and 1977 Beeville minor league teams played home games at Joe Hunter Field. Located on the campus of Coastal Bend College, the ballpark is still in use today as home to the Coastal Bend College Cougars baseball team. The ballpark was built with a donation from the family of Joe Hunter, a local rancher, after his death. The address for the campus is 3800 Charco Road in Beeville, Texas.

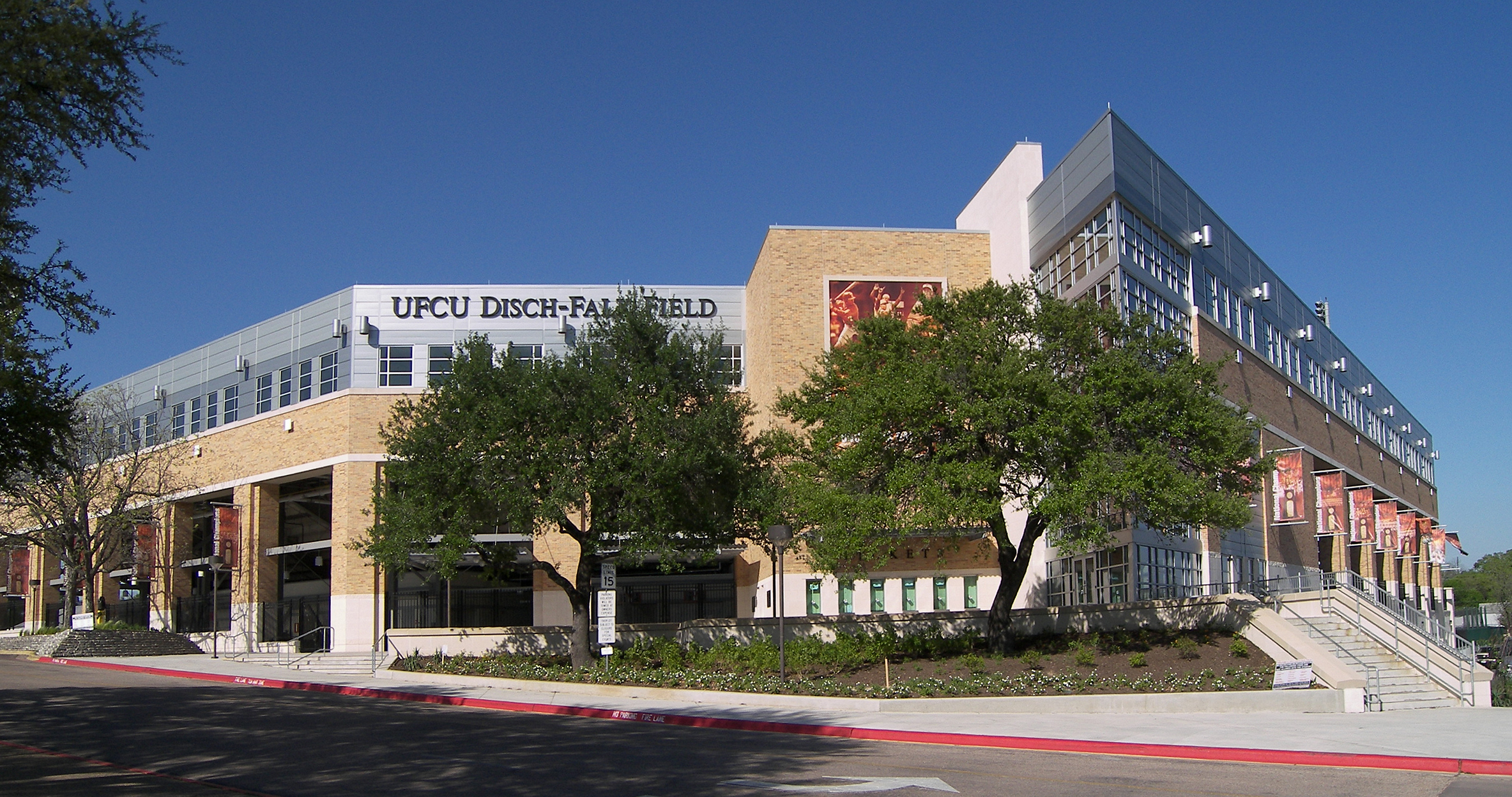
(2008) UFCU Disch-Falk Field. University of Texas. Named in part for 1911 Beeville manager Billy Disch

== Timeline ==
Year(s)	# Yrs.	Team	Level	League	Ballpark
1910–1911	2	Beeville Orange Growers	Class D	Southwest Texas League	The Ball Park
1926	1	Beeville Bees	Class D	Gulf Coast League	The Ball Park
1976	1	Beeville Bees	Class A	Gulf States League	Joe Hunter Field
1977	1	Beeville Blazers	Class A	Lone Star League	Joe Hunter Field

== Year–by–year records ==
Year	Record	Finish	Manager	Playoffs/Notes
1910	46–65	6th	Harry Longley / Francis Woessner	Did not qualify
1911	63–54	3rd	Billy Disch	League champions
1926	59–41	1st	Emmett Rose / E.C. Newberry	Lost in finals
1976	33–53	6th	Bob Leach	Lost in 1st round
1977	37–43	4th	Bill Bryk	Did not qualify

== Notable alumni ==
- Gene Cocreham (1911)
- Pete Compton (1910)
- Billy Disch (1911, MGR)
- Bert Gallia (1910–1911)
- Tommy Jones (1977)
- Polly McLarry (1911)
- Greg Wells (1976)
- Beeville Orange Growers players
- Beeville Bees players
- Beeville Blazers players
