= Joe Hunter Field =

Baseball field located in Beeville, Texas

- Interactive map of Joe Hunter Field
- Full name: Joe Hunter Field
- Location: Beeville, Texas
- Coordinates: 28.4387°N 97.75416°W
- Owner: Coastal Bend College
- Operator: Coastal Bend College

Tenants
- Coastal Bend College; Beeville Bees (Gulf States League) (1976); Beeville Blazers (Lone Star League]) (1977)

Joe Hunter Field is a baseball field located in Beeville, TX on the campus of Coastal Bend College formerly known as Bee County Junior College, home to the Cougars.

== Sources ==
- "Texas Almanac 2008-2009," The Dallas Morning News, c.2008
