= 1931 North Carolina Tar Heels baseball team =

American college baseball season

1931 North Carolina Tar Heels baseball

SoCon Champion
- Conference: Southern Conference
- Record: 16–4–2 ( SoCon)
- Head coach: James N. Ashmore

The 1931 North Carolina Tar Heels baseball team represented the University of North Carolina at Chapel Hill in the 1931 NCAA baseball season. The team claimed a Southern Conference championship.
