= 1929 Ole Miss Rebels baseball team =

American college baseball season

1929 Ole Miss Rebels baseball

SoCon Champion
- Conference: Southern Conference
- Record: 18–3 ( SoCon)
- Head coach: Pete Shields

The 1929 Ole Miss Rebels baseball team represented the University of Mississippi in the 1929 NCAA baseball season. The team was coached by Pete Shields, and claimed a SoCon championship.
