= 1931 Auburn Tigers baseball team =

Auburn University sports team

1931 Auburn Tigers baseball

SoCon Champion
- Conference: Southern Conference
- Record: 18–4 (11–3 SoCon)

The 1931 Auburn Tigers baseball team represented the Auburn Tigers of the Auburn University in the 1931 NCAA baseball season.
