= 1929 Duke Blue Devils baseball team =

American college baseball season

1929 Duke Blue Devils baseball

SoCon champion
- Conference: Southern Conference
- Record: 13–5 (7–0 SoCon)
- Head coach: Jack Coombs
- Home stadium: Hanes Field

The 1929 Duke Blue Devils baseball team represented the Duke Blue Devils baseball team of Duke University in the 1929 NCAA baseball season. It was Jack Coombs first year coaching.
