= 1928–29 Massachusetts Agricultural Aggies men's ice hockey season =

- Conference: Independent
- Home ice: Alumni Field Rink; Campus Pond

Record
- Overall: 7–5–0
- Home: 3–2–0
- Road: 4–2–0
- Neutral: 0–1–0

Coaches and captains
- Head coach: Lorin Ball
- Captain: Robby Nash

The 1928–29 Massachusetts Agricultural Aggies men's ice hockey season was the 21st season of play for the program. The Aggies were coached by Lorin Ball in his 5th season.

== Season ==
Owing to weather conditions, coach Ball announced that the team's first practice wouldn't take place until after the winter break. Initially, only nine games were scheduled, however, after the break the Aggies received an invitation from a new opponent. Connecticut Agricultural, which hadn't played a game in nearly 20 years, was hastily trying to arrange a slate of game and gave MAC a chance to start the season in early January. Despite a distinct lack of practice time, the Aggies accepted and headed down to Storrs for their opening tilt. The match doubled as a training session with coach Ball using seven different forwards in the game but everything went in the favor of the Maroon squad. Newcomer Ed Frost led the Aggies with a hat-trick and helped the team win its first game in nearly two years. In one game, the Aggies had scored more goals than they had all of the previous season.

After the fine start, MAC made its annual trip to New York, first taking on Hamilton. The game had to be moved to Utica due to issues with the Russell Sage Rink, however, that enabled the game to be viewed by tennis great Bill Tilden. With a renewed offense, MAC fought the Continentals on even turns throughout the evening. Twice Hamilton took the lead but both times MAC was able to quickly tie the match. After the Blue and Buff took their third advantage of the match, they managed to fend off the Aggies and remain ahead for the final period of play. In spite of the loss, MAC looked stronger than they had been in years and the team carried that belief into the next several games.

Army was next up for the Aggies and MAC had an easier time against the Cadets. Each of the starting forwards, Davis, Patch and Frost, scored in the game and pressured the Army cage to the point where the home team could barely get out of its own end. The defense got into the scoring action the next night against St. Stephen's. Bond opened the match about halfway through the first and Nash soon made the score 2–0. After a scoreless second, Myrick allowed the puck to get behind him but refused entry for the rest of the night. A second goal from Nash capped off the game and sent the team home in high spirits.

Upon their return, the team found that the weather was playing havoc with the ice once more and had to play their next game on the local pond. Bates proved to be a tough opponent for the Aggies but the defense remained in fine form. Poor ice took some of the speed out of the game, as did the fading light, but solid teamwork allowed Frost to net the only marker of the game and capture their third win in a row. The team finally ran out of luck when Williams arrived the following day. Still forced to use the campus pond, the Aggies quickly found themselves down by a goal and were unable to match the Ephs. MAC played as well as could be expected and nearly tied the game in the third, however, when Manty hit a rolling puck towards the cage the puck bounced right over the crossbar. Myrick made 22 saves in an otherwise brilliant performance that saw the team's winning streak end.

MAC's second road trip took the team up into Maine and they first met Bates for a rematch. With better ice conditions, the Aggies were able to get off to a hot start and score 4 goals in the first period. Bates closed the gap in the second but then exploded for 3 goals in the third period to take a 6–5 lead late. Part of the problem for the Aggies was that team captain Robby Nash had taken a puck to the face with about 5 minutes to play and was forced to leave the game. Just when it looked like MAC would lose, Manty scored his first goal of the season off of a rebound with just 30 seconds left and forced overtime. Waechter scored right at the start of the extra period and the team then played in a defensive shell to while away the rest of the 10-minute session. The next night, tired from the riotous Bates game, MAC played Bowdoin in a much more subdued affair. Because Nash was unable to play, Davis dropped back to take his spot on defense. Waechter played the entire game at center, however, with Frost also unable to go due to injury, the offense sputtered. David did play well on defense and limited the Polar Bears to just a single goal through two periods. Manty tied the match early in the third but a shot from center ice somehow eluded Myrick and ended up as the deciding goal, sinking the Aggies.

Both Frost and Nash were back for the next game but the offense was not. Playing on their home rink for the first time, the Aggies were again blanked, this time by New Hampshire. MAC took several runs at the UNH goal but the visitor's defense was too strong and stopped everything that the Aggies could give. Due to poor ice conditions, the game was limited to three 10-minute periods. A few days later the team took a trip across town to take on Amherst and the forwards were finally able to get back to scoring. After the Lord Jeffs opened the scoring, two goals from Frost gave MAC the lead early in the second. The rest of the period was dominated by Amherst and the score stood at 2–4 when the third began. Penalties caught up with the Sabrinas in the final frame and, while two players were off, MAC scored twice to tie the game. With just a few minutes remaining, however, Amherst got one more goal and managed to eke out a win over their cross-town rivals.

Now sitting at .500, the team headed into their final game on the schedule still looking to post a winning record. Weather forced the game back onto the pond and was played early to allow for Colby to catch a train to Boston after the match. Frost was the center of the offense for the Aggies once more, scoring the opening goal in the first. A later shot of his was stopped but put home by Manty on the rebound. Myrick, meanwhile, played a solid game with help from the defense. Nash was injured in the match but, with no further games on the schedule, his availability was a moot point. After the game, however, a return match with the Connecticut Aggies was arranged. Though the game was played on the pond, the ice was in good condition and allowed MAC to display its superior team. Despite the stellar performance by the visiting goalie, the Maroon offense netted four goals and steadily built a comfortable lead. Myrick was heading towards another shutout but saw the bid end with just minutes to spare when the nutmegers finally got onto the scoresheet.

The 7 wins tied the program record set back in 1911 as the Aggies posted their first winning season in seven years.

Kendall Marsh served as team manager.

== Roster ==
No.	Nat.	Player	Class	Pos	Height	Weight	DoB	Hometown	Previous team
	(United States)	Richard H. Bond Jr.	Junior	D				Dover, Massachusetts
	(United States)	Richard W. Davis	Sophomore	D/C				Melrose, Massachusetts
	(United States)	Edmund L. Frost	Sophomore	LW			1908-03-12	Arlington, Massachusetts
	(United States)	Asa F. Kinney	Senior	C/LW			1907-11-10	South Hadley, Massachusetts
	(United States)	Charles W. Manty Jr.	Sophomore	LW/RW			1908-07-24	Maynard, Massachusetts
	(United States)	Norman Myrick	Sophomore	G				Longmeadow, Massachusetts
	(United States)	Robley W. Nash	Senior	D				Abington, Massachusetts
	(United States)	Eldred K. Patch	Senior	D/F			1906-08-24	Stoneham, Massachusetts
	(United States)	Peter H. Waechter Jr.	Junior	C/RW			1909-06-11	Walpole, Massachusetts
	(United States)	Albert P. Zuger	Junior	LW			1907-03-11	New Haven, Connecticut

== Standings ==
1928–29 Eastern Collegiate ice hockey standings
	Intercollegiate							Overall					
	GP	W	L	T	Pct.	GF	GA	GP	W	L	T	GF	GA
Amherst	8	3	4	1	.438	13	18	9	3	5	1	14	20
Army	9	2	7	0	.222	11	50	12	3	9	0	23	61
Bates	11	4	6	1	.409	26	20	12	5	6	1	28	21
Boston College	10	4	6	0	.400	29	27	14	5	9	0	36	42
Boston University	10	9	1	0	.900	36	9	12	9	2	1	39	14
Bowdoin	9	5	4	0	.556	11	14	9	5	4	0	11	14
Brown	–	–	–	–	–	–	–	13	8	5	0	–	–
Clarkson	7	6	1	0	.857	43	11	10	9	1	0	60	19
Colby	5	0	4	1	.100	4	11	5	0	4	1	4	11
Colgate	7	4	3	0	.571	16	18	7	4	3	0	16	18
Connecticut Agricultural	–	–	–	–	–	–	–	–	–	–	–	–	–
Cornell	5	2	3	0	.400	7	9	5	2	3	0	7	9
Dartmouth	–	–	–	–	–	–	–	17	9	5	3	58	28
Hamilton	–	–	–	–	–	–	–	10	4	6	0	–	–
Harvard	7	4	3	0	.571	26	10	10	5	4	1	31	15
Massachusetts Agricultural	11	6	5	0	.545	30	20	12	7	5	0	33	21
Middlebury	10	7	3	0	.700	27	29	10	7	3	0	27	29
MIT	11	5	6	0	.455	26	32	11	5	6	0	26	32
New Hampshire	11	6	4	1	.591	23	20	11	6	4	1	23	20
Norwich	–	–	–	–	–	–	–	8	2	6	0	–	–
Pennsylvania	11	2	9	0	.182	12	82	13	2	10	1	–	–
Princeton	–	–	–	–	–	–	–	19	15	3	1	–	–
Rensselaer	–	–	–	–	–	–	–	4	1	3	0	–	–
St. John's	–	–	–	–	–	–	–	7	3	3	1	–	–
St. Lawrence	–	–	–	–	–	–	–	8	3	4	1	–	–
St. Stephen's	–	–	–	–	–	–	–	–	–	–	–	–	–
Syracuse	–	–	–	–	–	–	–	–	–	–	–	–	–
Union	5	2	2	1	.500	17	14	5	2	2	1	17	14
Vermont	–	–	–	–	–	–	–	–	–	–	–	–	–
Williams	10	6	4	0	.600	33	16	10	6	4	0	33	16
Yale	12	10	1	1	.875	47	9	17	15	1	1	64	12

== Schedule and results ==
Date	Opponent	Site	Result	Record
Regular Season
January 7	at Connecticut Agricultural*	Storrs, Connecticut	W 6–0	1–0–0
January 12	vs. Hamilton*	Utica, New York	L 2–3	1–1–0
January 16	at Army*	Stuart Rink • West Point, New York	W 3–1	2–1–0
January 17	at St. Stephen's*	Annandale-on-Hudson, New York	W 3–1	3–1–0
January 21	Bates*	Campus Pond • Amherst, Massachusetts	W 1–0	4–1–0
January 22	Williams*	Campus Pond • Amherst, Massachusetts	L 0–1	4–2–0
January 25	at Bates*	Bartlett Street Rink • Lewiston, Maine	W 7–6 ^{OT}	5–2–0
January 26	at Bowdoin*	Delta Rink • Brunswick, Maine	L 1–2	5–3–0
February 2	New Hampshire*	Alumni Field Rink • Amherst, Massachusetts	L 0–1	5–4–0
February 5	at Amherst*	Pratt Field Rink • Amherst, Massachusetts	L 4–5	5–5–0
February 8	Colby*	Campus Pond • Amherst, Massachusetts	W 2–0	6–5–0
February 12	Connecticut Agricultural*	Campus Pond • Amherst, Massachusetts	W 4–1	7–5–0
*Non-conference game.

== Scoring statistics ==
Name	Position	Games	Goals	Assists	Points
Ed Frost	LW	11	12	2	14
Dick Davis	D/C	12	5	0	5
Charlie Manty	LW/RW	11	4	1	5
Pete Waechter	C/RW	11	4	1	5
Robby Nash	D	11	3	2	5
Dicky Bond	D	12	1	1	2
Chub Patch	D/C/RW	12	1	1	2
Al Zuger	LW	9	1	0	1
Asa Kinney	C/LW	2	0	0	0
Norm Myrick	G	12	0	0	0
Total			31	8	39

Note: Assists were reported infrequently.Note: The names of the players who scored the final two goals against Amherst were not reported.
