= Hargesheimer =

Hargesheimer is a surname. It may refer to:

- Alan Hargesheimer, American Major League Baseball pitcher
- Fred Hargesheimer (1916–2010), USAAF pilot during World War II, later a philanthropist
- Walter Hargesheimer (1912–1996), American football player and football and basketball coach
