= UFCU Disch–Falk Field =

Baseball stadium in Austin, Texas

UFCU Disch-Falk Field
- "The Disch"
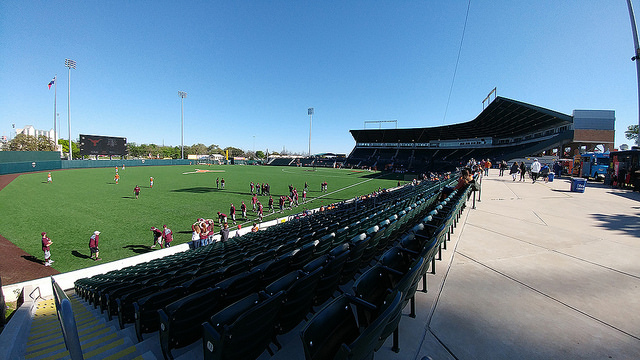
- View from Left Field Concourse
- Interactive map of UFCU Disch-Falk Field
- Former names: Disch-Falk Field (1975-August 1, 2006)
- Address: 1300 E Martin Luther King Jr Blvd; Austin, Texas 78702
- Coordinates: 30°16′47″N 97°43′35″W
- Owner: University of Texas
- Operator: Texas Longhorns
- Capacity: 7,373
- Executive suites: 17
- Surface: AstroTurf (1975–2007); FieldTurf (2008–present)
- Record attendance: 10,000 vs. Texas Rangers (April 4, 1977); 8,502 vs. Louisiana Tech (June 4, 2022)
- Field size: Left field: 340 ft (103.5 m); Center field: 400 ft (122 m); Right field: 325 ft (99 m); Power Alleys: 370-365 ft (112 m)

Construction
- Opened: February 17, 1975
- Renovated: 2006-2008
- Cost: $2.5 million $21 million (2008 renovation)
- Architect: DLR Group (2008 renovation)

Tenant
- Texas Longhorns (NCAA) (1975–present)

Website
- Facility Info

UFCU Disch–Falk Field is the baseball stadium of the University of Texas at Austin. It has been home to Texas Longhorns baseball since it opened on February 17, 1975, replacing Clark Field as the home of the Longhorns.

The stadium is named for former Longhorns coaches Billy Disch and Bibb Falk. Beginning August 1, 2006, the name of the stadium was changed to UFCU Disch–Falk Field, following a sponsorship deal with a local credit union, University Federal Credit Union.

== Stadium History ==
- February 17, 1975 - The Longhorns swept a doubleheader from St. Mary's, (Texas) 4-0 and 11–0, in their first games on the new field
- April 19, 1975 - Stadium was dedicated as Disch-Falk Field prior to Texas’ doubleheader sweep of TCU (18-3 and 14–0)
- Summer 1979 - New AstroTurf was installed on the infield
- May 19, 1982 - The largest crowd ever to see a collegiate game at Disch-Falk Field – 8,000 fans – saw Texas defeat Oklahoma, 8–0, during the NCAA Central Regional
- Summer 1985 - New AstroTurf was installed on the entire field
- Summer 1989 - A new computerized scoreboard was installed in left field
- Winter 1995 - New AstroTurf was installed on the infield.
- Winter 1996 - The computerized scoreboard was upgraded
- Winter 1999 - New AstroTurf was installed on the entire field, the outfield fence was constructed and padded and the clubhouse and team areas were renovated
- Spring 2005 - New scoreboard with Jumbotron is installed in left field
- August 1, 2006 - Stadium renamed UFCU Disch–Falk Field
- Spring 2008 - Work completed on $25.8 million renovation of UFCU Disch–Falk Field
- Fall 2009 - FieldTurf playing surface was installed
- Spring 2012 - New videoboard installed in right field
- Winter 2016 - New FieldTurf playing surface was installed and the fences in the gaps were moved closer
- Winter 2019 - Replaced left field scoreboard with a new videoboard
- Fall 2019 - Opened the 21,500-square-foot J. Dan Brown Family Player Development Center

Note: The entire playing surface, excluding the pitcher's mound, is FieldTurf. UFCU Disch–Falk Field has held 28 regionals and held six super regionals.

=== Attendance ===
In 2013, the Longhorns ranked 6th among Division I baseball programs in attendance, averaging 5,793 per home game.

In 2012, college baseball writer Eric Sorenson ranked the stadium as the fifth best big game atmosphere in Division I baseball.

== Changes to Disch-Falk ==
=== 2006-2008 Renovation ===
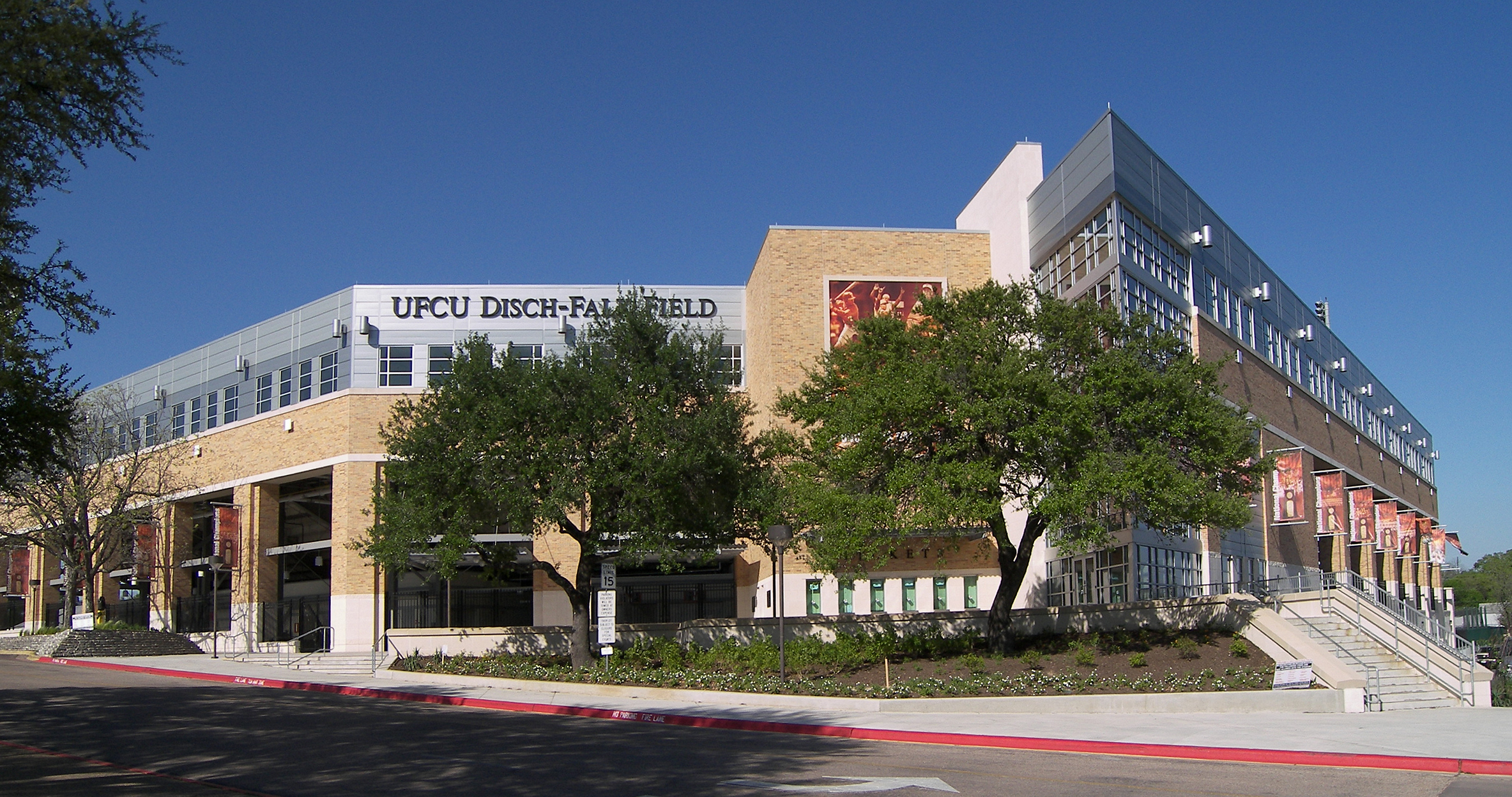
The new exterior facade after renovation

In July 2005, the university announced an $18 million renovation project for Disch-Falk Field. Construction began in late 2006. The Longhorns played their 2007 season at the stadium during the renovation, although a few early season games and the NCAA Regional tournament were moved to the nearby Dell Diamond. Completed for the 2008 season, the renovated Disch-Falk field was designed by architectural firm DLR Group. The renovations included:

- 107 premium seats added increasing capacity to 6,756
- 17 new suites
- lowering of the seating bowl six feet to field level
- complete replacement of the seating bowl
- expanded concourse
- new team merchandise store
- new full-service ticket office
- expanded concessions and restrooms
- enhanced media services spaces
- new lighting and sound systems
- new metal wall cladding and TPO roof
- dugouts moved closer to the field
- new bullpens
- new weight training facility
- new team training areas
- new team meeting room
- new coaches offices
- replacement of AstroTurf surface with FieldTurf.

=== Scoreboard ===
Before the 2019 season the left field videoboard was completely replaced. The right field scoreboard was installed before the 2012 season.

=== Naming ===
October 12, 2005, the university announced a $13.1 million gift from University Federal Credit Union as the major gift in the campaign to finance the renovation of the ballpark. In connection with this gift, the name of the stadium changed to UFCU Disch–Falk Field on August 1, 2006.

== Attendance records ==
- Through June 8, 2026

UFCU Disch–Falk Field Attendance Record
| # | Date | Opponent | Result | Attendance | notes |
|---|---|---|---|---|---|
| 1 | April 5, 1977 | Texas Rangers | L 4–9 | 10,000 | Exhibition, some fans sat in roped-off warning track |
| 2 | June 6, 2026 | Oregon | W 11–3 | 8,550 | NCAA Austin Super Regional, Largest Collegiate Game |
| 3 | June 4, 2022 | Louisiana Tech | W 5–2 | 8,502 | NCAA Austin Regional |
| 4 | June 7, 2026 | Oregon | W 6–5 | 8,465 | NCAA Austin Super Regional |
| 5 | June 5, 2022 | Air Force | W 10–1 | 8,325 | NCAA Austin Regional |
| 6 | May 30, 2026 | Tarleton State | W 16–2 | 8,276 | NCAA Austin Regional Final |
| 7 | April 2, 1991 | Texas Rangers | L 5–12 | 8,234 | Exhibition |
| 8 | March 5, 2024 | Texas A&M | L 2–9 | 8,060 | Largest Regular Season Game |
| 9 | March 28, 2026 | Oklahoma | W 5–4^{(10)} | 8,059 | |
| 10 | February 24, 2024 | Cal Poly | W 6–0 | 8,033 | |
| 11 | May 29, 1982 | Oklahoma | W 8–0 | 8,000 | NCAA Central Regional |
| 12 | March 29, 2022 | Texas A&M | L 9–12 | 7,990 | |
| 13 | March 27, 2026 | Oklahoma | W 4–3^{(10)} | 7,990 | |
| 14 | April 2, 2019 | Texas A&M | L 6–9 | 7,952 | |
| 15 | April 25, 2025 | Texas A&M | W 2–1 | 7,942 | 3-Game series record 23,680 |
| 16 | February 16, 2024 | San Diego | W 7–3 | 7,935 | Largest Opening Day attendance |
| 17 | April 27, 2025 | Texas A&M | W 6–5 | 7,930 | 3-Game series record 23,680 |
| 18 | April 10, 2024 | Texas State | L 3–7 | 7,928 | |
| 19 | April 6, 2024 | BYU | L 5–7 | 7,913 | |
| 20 | April 22, 2023 | Oklahoma | L 4–6 | 7,887 | Game 2 of Doubleheader |

== Gallery ==
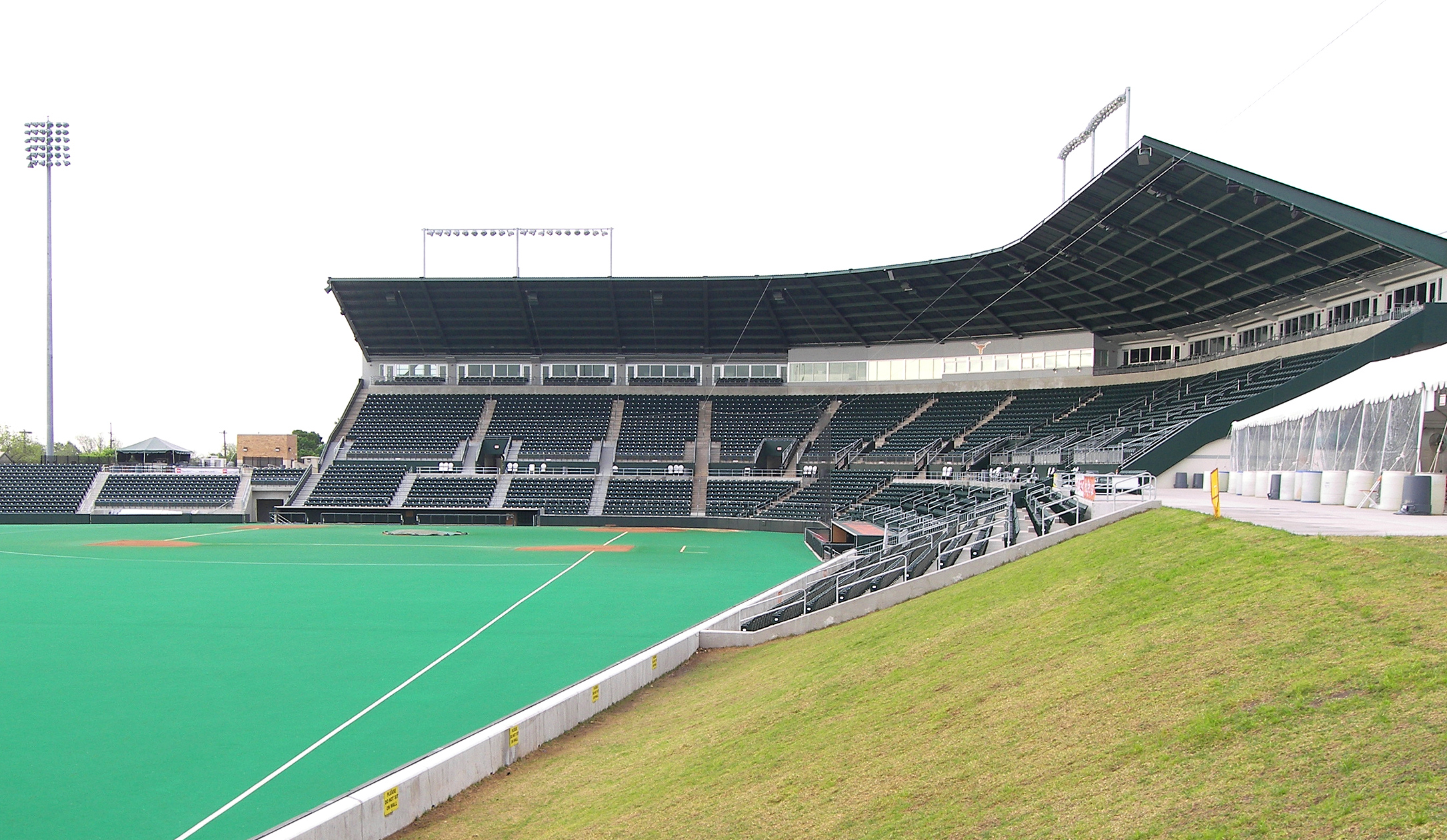
Disch-Falk Field 2008

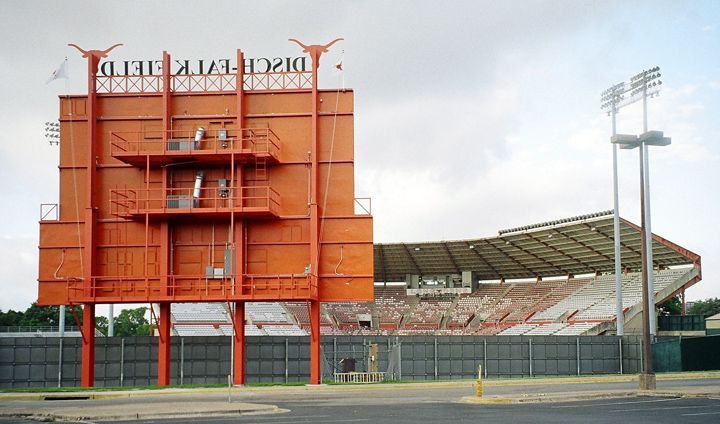
Disch-Falk Field 2005

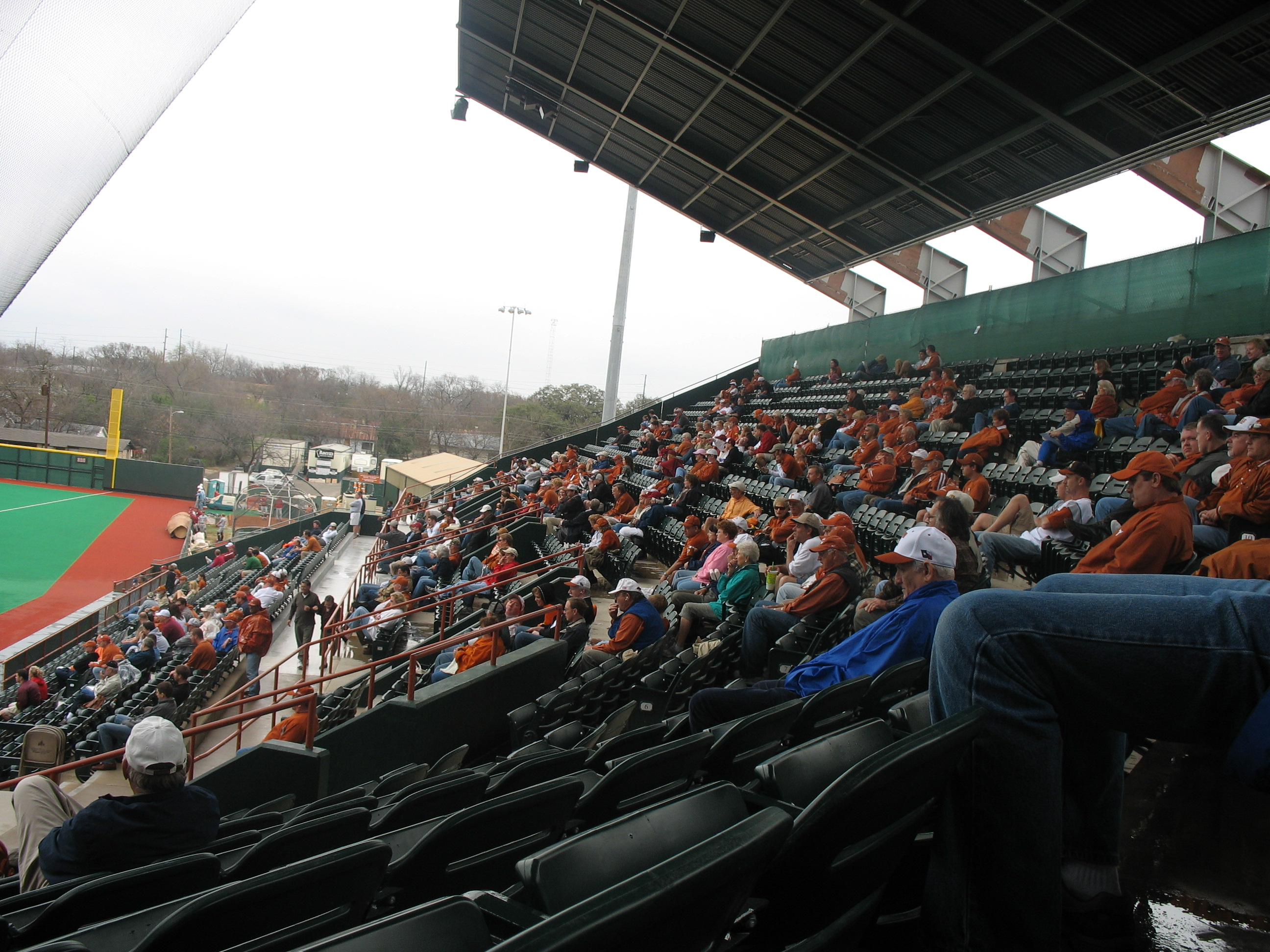
View of first base side seating at UFCU Disch-Falk Field during the 2006-07 Texas Baseball season, during renovation

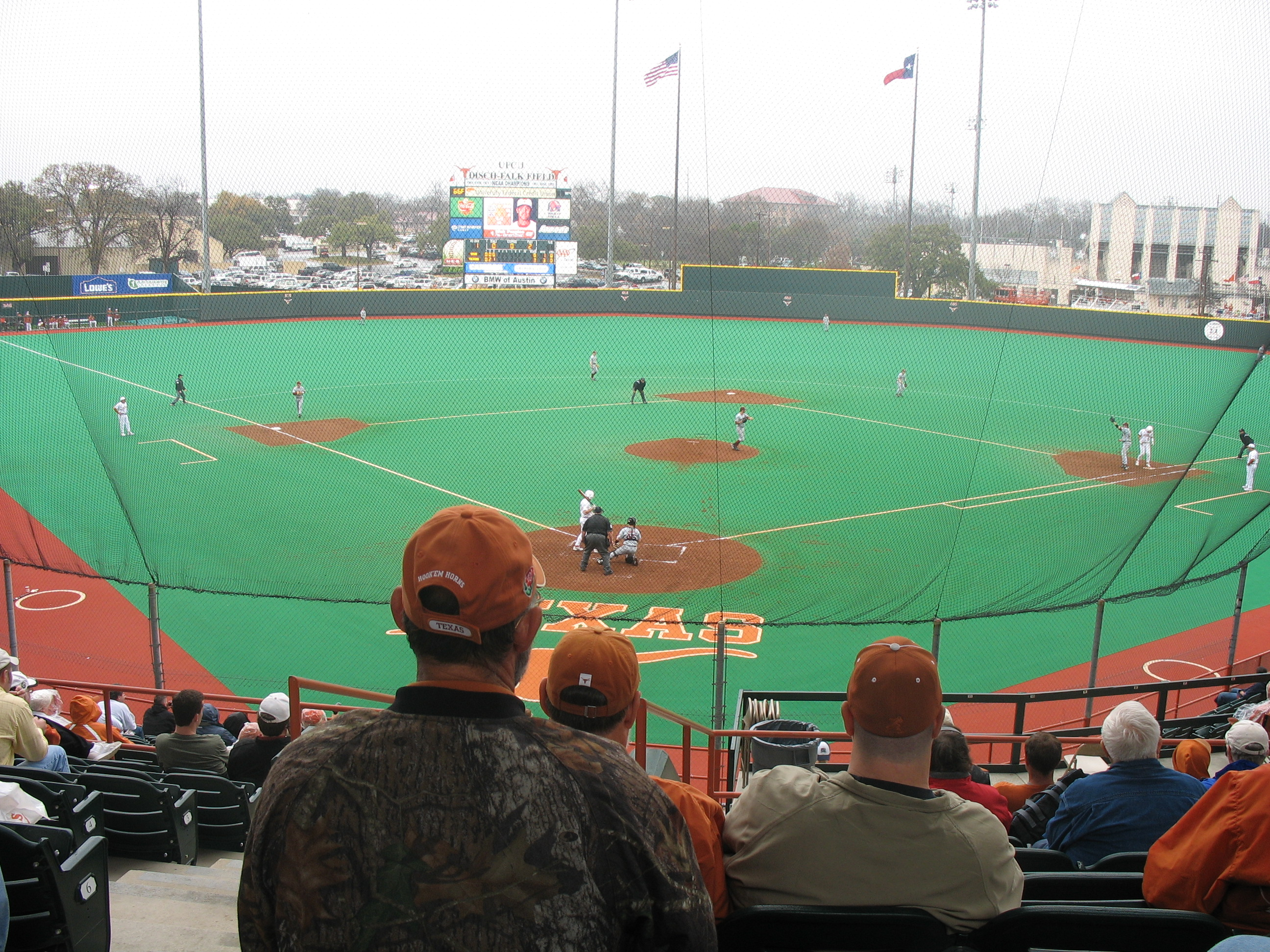
Texas Baseball game vs Washington State during the 2006–07 season at UFCU Disch-Falk Field

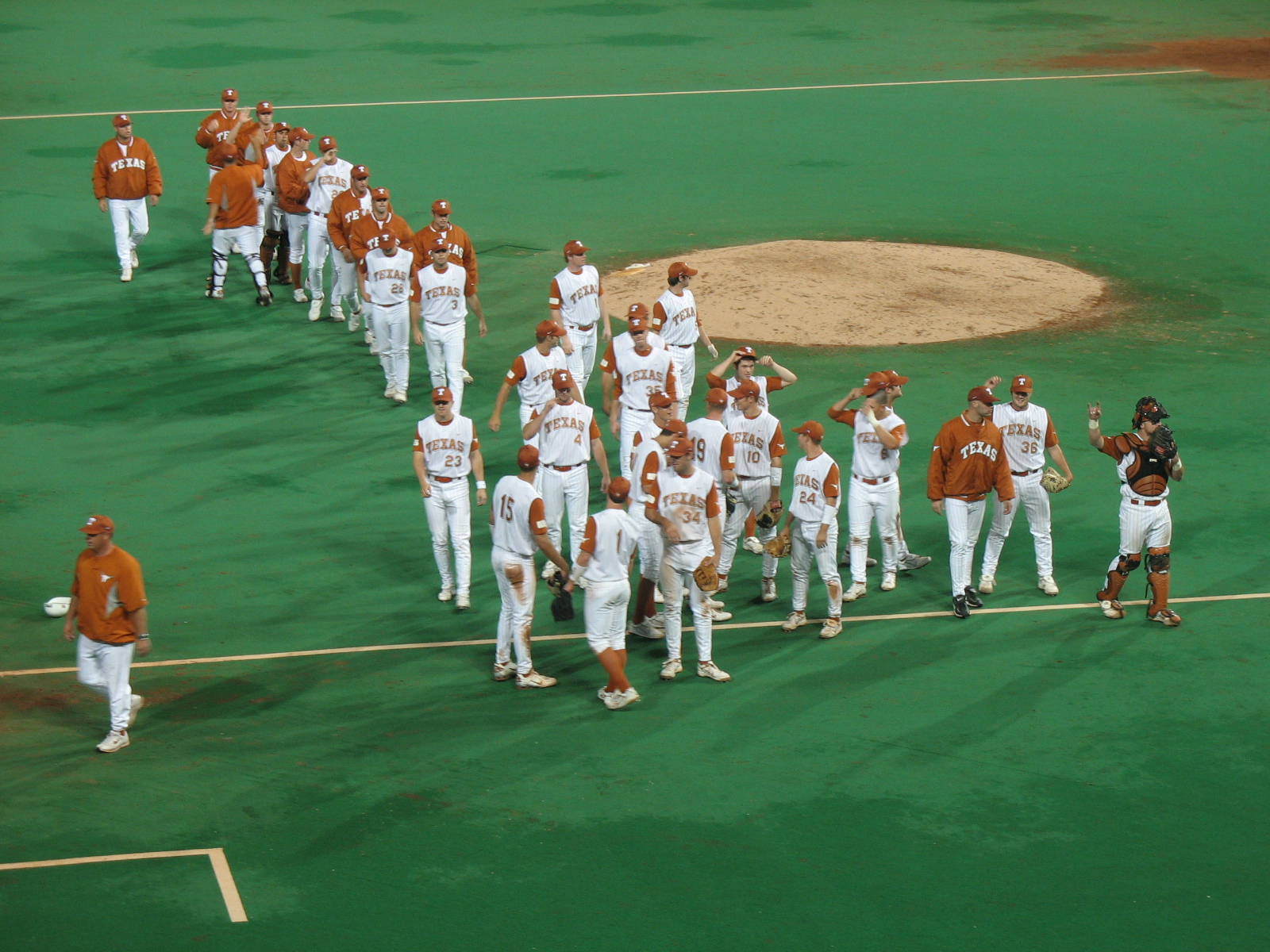
Eyes of Texas after a Texas Baseball game against University of Oklahoma 3-30-2007

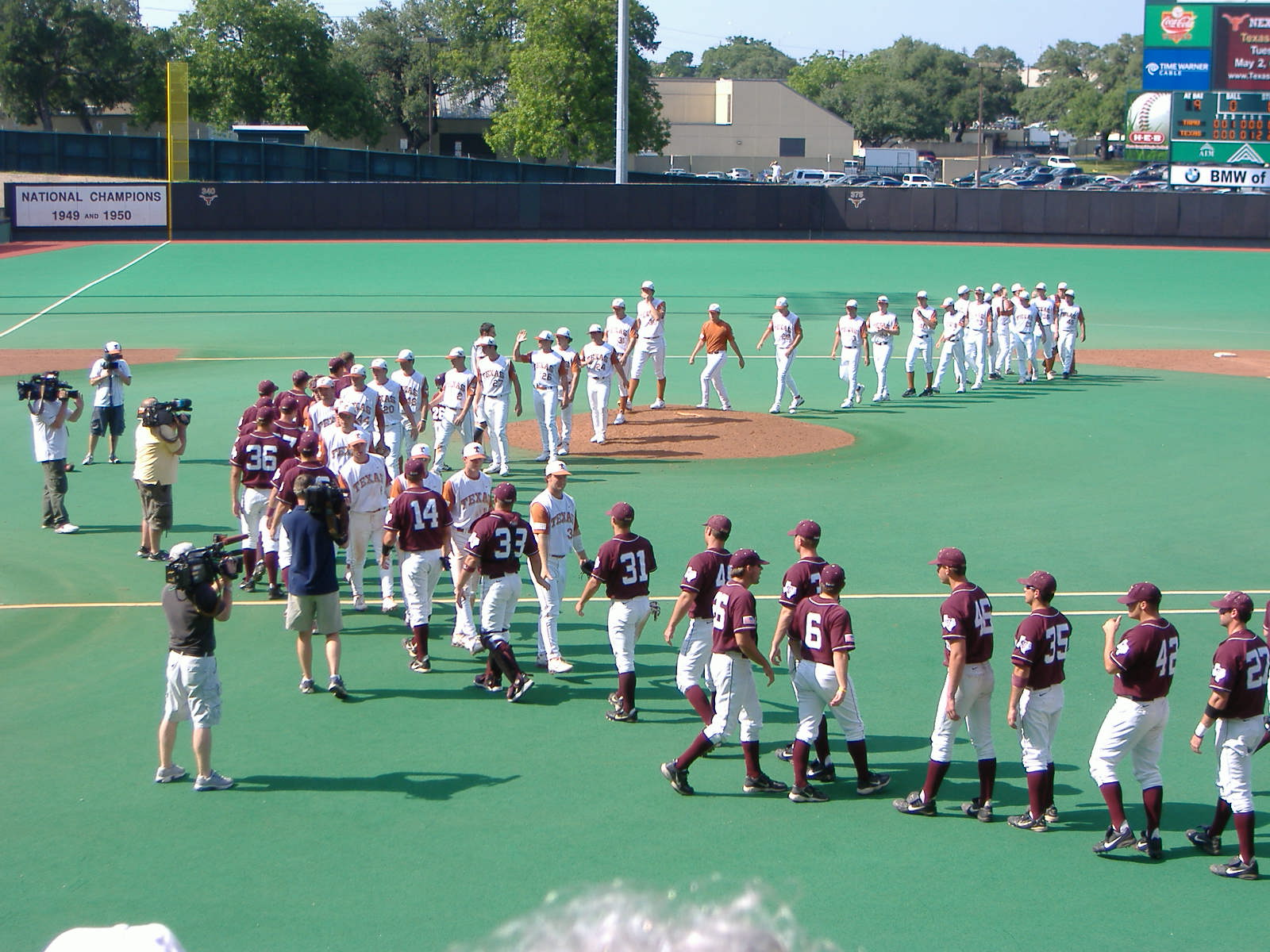
After a Lone Star Showdown baseball game

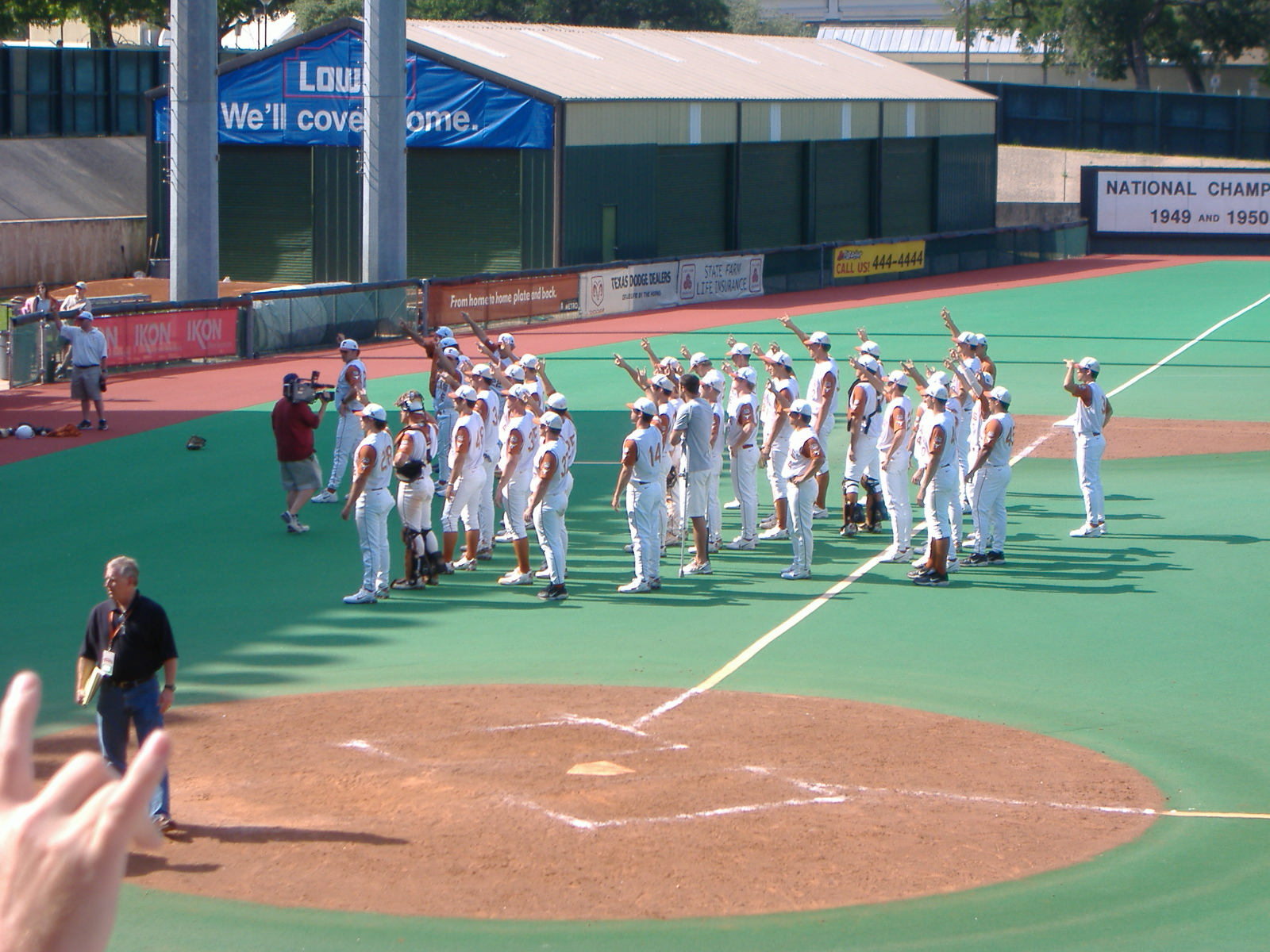
After game vs Texas A&M

== See also ==
- List of NCAA Division I baseball venues
