= Tommy Bartlett (basketball) =

American basketball and tennis player and coach

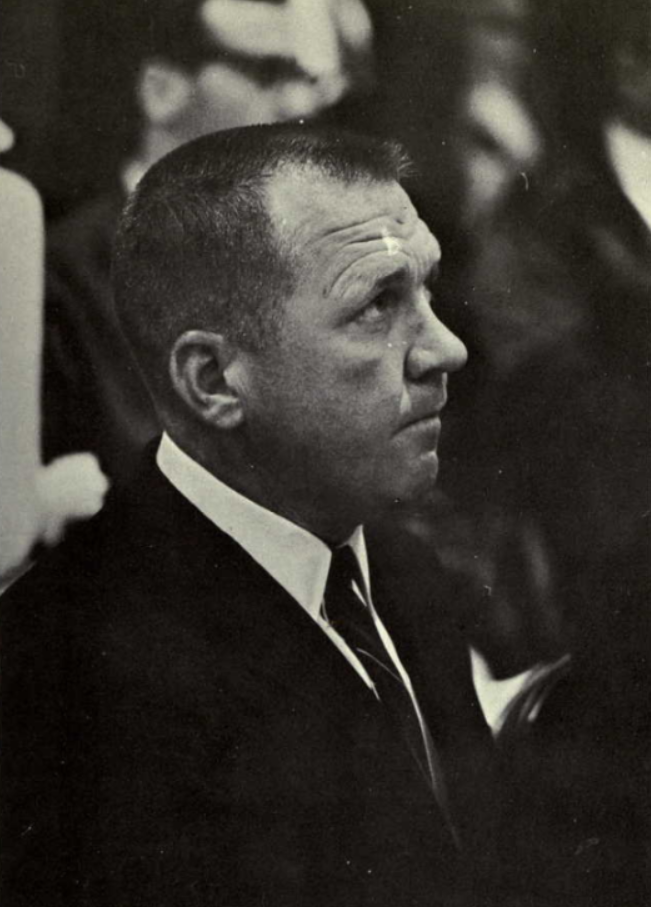
- Bartlett from 1967 Seminole yearbook

Biographical details
- Born: June 6, 1928; Homerville, Georgia, U.S.
- Died: October 19, 2016 (aged 88); Chattanooga, Tennessee, U.S.

Playing career
- 1950–1952: Tennessee
- Positions: Guard (basketball); Singles & doubles (tennis)

Coaching career (HC unless noted)

Basketball
- 1953–1957: Lenoir City HS
- 1957–1958: Carson–Newman
- 1958–1962: Chattanooga
- 1962–1966: Tennessee (Asst.)
- 1966–1973: Florida

Tennis
- 1962–1966: Tennessee
- 1979–1990: Chattanooga

Head coaching record
- Overall: 168–130 (.564) (Basketball)

Accomplishments and honors

Championships
- SEC Men's Tennis (1966); 8 SoCon Men's Tennis (1980–1985, 1988, 1989); 5 SoCon Women's Tennis (1984–1986, 1988, 1990); 3 NCAA Division II Women's Tennis (1983–1985)

Awards
- 7× SoCon Men's Tennis Coach of the Year (1980–1983, 1985, 1988, 1989); 2× SoCon Women's Tennis Coach of the Year (1986, 1990)

Thomas George Bartlett (June 6, 1928 – October 19, 2016) was an American college basketball and tennis player, as well as a college basketball and tennis head coach. After graduating from the University of Tennessee, Bartlett served as the men's basketball head coach for Carson-Newman College, the University of Chattanooga (now the University of Tennessee at Chattanooga), and the University of Florida, and also as the men's tennis head coach at the University of Tennessee and UT-Chattanooga.

== Early life and playing career ==
Bartlett was born in Homerville, Georgia, and graduated from Knoxville High School in Knoxville, Tennessee. He attended the University of Tennessee in Knoxville, where he played for the Tennessee Volunteers basketball team from 1949 to 1952 and the Volunteers men's tennis team from 1950 to 1952. In basketball, he was a three-year varsity letterman, team captain, and an All-Southeastern Conference (SEC) selection at guard as a senior; in tennis, he was a three-year letterman, a two-year starter, and the team captain and an All-SEC selection as a senior. Memorably, Bartlett was undefeated in three seasons on the Volunteers varsity men's tennis team, and won SEC singles tennis championships at No. 6 in 1950, No. 5 in 1951, and No. 3 in 1952, and SEC doubles championships at No. 3 in 1950 and 1951, and No. 2 in 1952. As a senior, Bartlett and was also the third-ranked college basketball player in the percentage of foul shots completed (80.2%), and led the Vols to their first-ever SEC team championship in men's tennis. He graduated from Tennessee in 1952.

== Coaching career ==
Bartlett began his coaching career at Lenoir City High School in Lenoir City, Tennessee, in 1953. In four seasons as the Lenoir City Panthers head coach, he compiled an overall win–loss record of 97–20, and led the Panthers to the state high school championship semifinal game before losing to Kingsport High School in 1957.

He subsequently served as the head basketball coach for Carson-Newman College in 1957–1958, and the University of Chattanooga from 1958 to 1962. In 1962, he returned to his alma mater, the University of Tennessee at Knoxville, as an assistant basketball coach under Ray Mears. In 1963, while continuing as a Volunteers basketball assistant, he also became the head coach of the Volunteers men's tennis team. In 1966, he led the Vols tennis team to their second SEC tennis team championship, and their first since 1952—when Bartlett was a member of the team.

In 1966, Bartlett began a seven-year tenure at Florida after Norm Sloan left for North Carolina State. Unlike Sloan, Bartlett emphasized defense from the start. Bartlett's first Gators squad, including Gary Keller and Neal Walk, was the best Florida had produced until that time; they finished 21–4 overall (the school's first 20-win season), and 14–4 in the SEC. It was also the first Gators basketball squad to ever be ranked in the national polls. In an era when only conference champions were guaranteed bids in the 23-team NCAA Tournament, the Gators missed their first SEC title and NCAA Tournament appearance by a single game after losing to coach Ray Mears' Tennessee Volunteers twice in the regular season. Although Bartlett's 1968–1969 Gators received an invitation to the 1969 National Invitation Tournament (NIT), none of his subsequent Gators teams equaled the success of his first. He was also responsible for recruiting Florida's first African-American player, Steve Williams. He finished with an overall win–loss record of 95–85 and 62–64 in the SEC.

Bartlett returned to collegiate coaching in 1979, serving as the men's and women's tennis head coach for the Chattanooga Mocs for twelve seasons until 1990. His Chattanooga Mocs teams won eight Southern Conference men's tennis championships (1980, 1981, 1982, 1983, 1984, 1985, 1988 and 1989); his Lady Mocs teams won five Southern Conference women's tennis championships (1984, 1985, 1986, 1988 and 1990) and three NCAA Division II women's tennis championships (1983, 1984 and 1985).

Bartlett was inducted into the Tennessee Sports Hall of Fame in 1986. He died on October 19, 2016, at his home in Chattanooga.

== Tennis family ==
Bartlett's daughter-in-law, Sue Bartlett, was an All-American for the Chattanooga Lady Mocs tennis team in 1978; his granddaughter, Claire Bartlett, played for the Florida Gators women's tennis team from 2008 to 2011.

== Head coaching record ==
=== Men's basketball ===
Record table
| Season | Team | Overall | Conference | Standing | Postseason |
|---|---|---|---|---|---|
Carson–Newman Eagles () (1957–1958)
| 1957–58 | Carson–Newman | 17–7 | | | |
| Carson–Newman: | | 17–7 | | | |
Chattanooga Mocs () (1958–1962)
| 1958–59 | Chattanooga | 14–7 | | | |
| 1959–60 | Chattanooga | 10–13 | | | |
| 1960–61 | Chattanooga | 17–8 | | | NCAA College Division first round |
| 1961–62 | Chattanooga | 15–10 | | | |
| Chattanooga: | | 56–38 | | | |
Florida Gators (Southeastern Conference) (1966–1973)
| 1966–67 | Florida | 21–4 | 14–4 | 2nd | |
| 1967–68 | Florida | 15–10 | 11–7 | 5th | |
| 1968–69 | Florida | 18–9 | 12–6 | 3rd | NIT 1st round |
| 1969–70 | Florida | 9–17 | 6–12 | 8th | |
| 1970–71 | Florida | 11–15 | 8–10 | 7th | |
| 1971–72 | Florida | 10–15 | 4–14 | 10th | |
| 1972–73 | Florida | 11–15 | 7–11 | 7th | |
| Florida: | | 95–85 (.528) | 62–64 (.492) | | |
| Total: | | 168–130 (.564) | | | |
National champion Postseason invitational champion Conference regular season champion Conference regular season and conference tournament champion Division regular season champion Division regular season and conference tournament champion Conference tournament champion

== See also ==
- Carson–Newman Eagles
- Chattanooga Mocs
- Florida Gators
- List of University of Tennessee people
- Tennessee Volunteers
- University Athletic Association

== Bibliography ==
- Koss, Bill, Pond Birds: Gator Basketball, The Whole Story From The Inside, Fast Break Press, Gainesville, Florida (1996). ISBN 978-0-8130-1523-1.
