= 1934 NCAA baseball season =

Baseball season

Seasons
- ← 1933 1935 →

The 1934 NCAA baseball season, play of college baseball in the United States organized by the National Collegiate Athletic Association (NCAA) began in the spring of 1934. Play largely consisted of regional matchups, some organized by conferences, and ended in June. No national championship event was held until 1947.

== Conference winners ==
This is a partial list of conference champions from the 1934 season.

Conference	Regular season winner
Big Nine	Illinois
CIBA	California
EIBL	Columbia
Pacific Coast Conference North	Oregon
Southeastern Conference	Alabama
Southwest Conference	Texas A&M

== Conference standings ==
The following is an incomplete list of conference standings:

1934 Eastern Intercollegiate Baseball League baseball standings
	Conf.						Overall
Team	W		L		T	PCT	W		L		T	PCT
Columbia ‍†‍‍	8	–	4	–	0	.667	9	–	7	–	0	.563
Cornell ‍‍‍	7	–	5	–	0	.583	11	–	11	–	0	.500
Harvard ‍‍‍	6	–	5	–	0	.545	20	–	17	–	0	.541
Dartmouth ‍‍‍	6	–	6	–	0	.500	14	–	9	–	0	.609
Penn ‍‍‍	6	–	6	–	0	.500	9	–	12	–	0	.429
Yale ‍‍‍	5	–	9	–	0	.357	7	–	14	–	0	.333
Princeton ‍‍‍	3	–	8	–	0	.273	9	–	15	–	2	.385
† – Conference champion
