= 1928 NCAA baseball season =

American college baseball season

Seasons
- ← 1927 1929 →

The 1928 NCAA baseball season was a season of college baseball in the United States organized by the National Collegiate Athletic Association (NCAA) began in the spring of 1928. Play largely consisted of regional matchups, some organized by conferences, and ended in June. No national championship event was held until 1947.

== Conference winners ==
This is a partial list of conference champions from the 1928 season.

Conference	Regular season winner
Big Ten Conference	Michigan
Missouri Valley	Kansas
CIBA	St. Mary's
Pacific Coast Conference North	Oregon/Washington State
Southern Conference	Auburn
Southwest Conference	Texas
