= 1932 NCAA baseball season =

Baseball season

Seasons
- ← 1931 1933 →

The 1932 NCAA baseball season, play of college baseball in the United States organized by the National Collegiate Athletic Association (NCAA) began in the spring of 1932. Play largely consisted of regional matchups, some organized by conferences, and ended in June. No national championship event was held until 1947.

== Conference winners ==
This is a partial list of conference champions from the 1932 season.

Conference	Regular season winner
Big Nine	Indiana
Big Six	Missouri
CIBA	Southern California
EIBL	Yale
Pacific Coast Conference North	Washington
Southwest Conference	Texas

== Conference standings ==
The following is an incomplete list of conference standings:

1932 Eastern Intercollegiate Baseball League baseball standings
	Conf.						Overall
Team	W		L		T	PCT	W		L		T	PCT
Yale ‍†‍‍	8	–	2	–	0	.800	17	–	10	–	0	.630
Columbia ‍‍‍	7	–	3	–	0	.700	13	–	6	–	1	.675
Penn ‍‍‍	5	–	5	–	0	.500	8	–	8	–	0	.500
Dartmouth ‍‍‍	4	–	6	–	0	.400	7	–	7	–	0	.500
Princeton ‍‍‍	3	–	6	–	0	.333	11	–	13	–	0	.458
Cornell ‍‍‍	2	–	7	–	0	.222	3	–	9	–	0	.250
† – Conference champion
