= 1933 NCAA baseball season =

Baseball season

Seasons
- ← 1932 1934 →

The 1933 NCAA baseball season, play of college baseball in the United States organized by the National Collegiate Athletic Association (NCAA) began in the spring of 1933. Play largely consisted of regional matchups, some organized by conferences, and ended in June. No national championship event was held until 1947.

== Conference changes ==
- 12 schools left the Southern Conference to form the Southeastern Conference for the 1933 season. The teams were: Alabama, Auburn, Florida, Georgia, Georgia Tech, Kentucky, LSU, Mississippi State, Ole Miss, Tennessee, Tulane, and Vanderbilt. A limited, unbalanced schedule was implemented for 1933.

== Conference winners ==
This is a partial list of conference champions from the 1933 season.

Conference	Regular season winner
Big Nine	Minnesota
Big Six	Kansas State/Oklahoma
CIBA	California
EIBL	Columbia
Pacific Coast Conference North	Washington State
Southeastern Conference	Georgia
Southwest Conference	TCU

== Conference standings ==
The following is an incomplete list of conference standings:

1933 Eastern Intercollegiate Baseball League baseball standings
	Conf.						Overall
Team	W		L		T	PCT	W		L		T	PCT
Columbia ‍†‍‍	9	–	2	–	0	.818	13	–	2	–	0	.867
Yale ‍‍‍	9	–	3	–	0	.750	17	–	12	–	0	.586
Dartmouth ‍‍‍	7	–	5	–	0	.583	10	–	6	–	0	.625
Harvard ‍‍‍	5	–	6	–	0	.455	10	–	4	–	0	.714
Penn ‍‍‍	5	–	7	–	0	.417	7	–	10	–	0	.412
Cornell ‍‍‍	3	–	7	–	0	.300	8	–	8	–	1	.500
Princeton ‍‍‍	1	–	11	–	0	.083	9	–	19	–	0	.321
† – Conference champion
