= 1929 NCAA baseball season =

Baseball season

Seasons
- ← 1928 1930 →

The 1929 NCAA baseball season was a season of college baseball in the United States organized by the National Collegiate Athletic Association (NCAA) began in the spring of 1929. Play largely consisted of regional matchups, some organized by conferences, and ended in June. No national championship event was held until 1947.

== Conference changes ==
- The Missouri Valley split into the Big Six and Missouri Valley Conference. Iowa State, Kansas, Missouri, Nebraska, and Oklahoma formed the Big Six, while Drake, Grinnell, Oklahoma A&M, and Washington (St. Louis) formed the Missouri Valley.

== Conference winners ==
This is a partial list of conference champions from the 1924 season.

Conference	Regular season winner
Big Ten Conference	Michigan
Big Six	Nebraska
CIBA	California
Pacific Coast Conference North	Washington
Southern Conference	Duke/Ole Miss
Southwest Conference	Texas
