= 1930 NCAA baseball season =

Baseball season

Seasons
- ← 1929 1931 →

The 1930 NCAA baseball season, play of college baseball in the United States organized by the National Collegiate Athletic Association (NCAA) began in the spring of 1930. Play largely consisted of regional matchups, some organized by conferences, and ended in June. No national championship event was held until 1947.

== Conference changes ==
- Six northeastern schools formed the Eastern Intercollegiate Baseball League, a forerunner of the Ivy League. These teams were: Columbia, Cornell, Dartmouth, Penn, Princeton, and Yale.

== Conference winners ==
This is a partial list of conference champions from the 1930 season.

Conference	Regular season winner
Big Nine	Michigan
Big Six	Kansas State/Nebraska
CIBA	Southern California
EIBL	Dartmouth
Pacific Coast Conference North	Washington
Southwest Conference	Texas

== Conference standings ==
The following is an incomplete list of conference standings:

1930 Eastern Intercollegiate Baseball League baseball standings
	Conf.						Overall
Team	W		L		T	PCT	W		L		T	PCT
Dartmouth ‍†‍‍	8	–	2	–	0	.800	13	–	9	–	0	.591
Penn ‍‍‍	6	–	4	–	0	.600	19	–	7	–	0	.731
Yale ‍‍‍	7	–	6	–	0	.538	14	–	13	–	0	.519
Columbia ‍‍‍	5	–	5	–	0	.500	12	–	9	–	0	.571
Cornell ‍‍‍	3	–	6	–	0	.333	4	–	16	–	0	.200
Princeton ‍‍‍	2	–	8	–	0	.200	10	–	20	–	1	.339
† – Conference champion
