= 1931 NCAA baseball season =

Baseball season

Seasons
- ← 1930 1932 →

The 1931 NCAA baseball season, play of college baseball in the United States organized by the National Collegiate Athletic Association (NCAA) began in the spring of 1931. Play largely consisted of regional matchups, some organized by conferences, and ended in June. No national championship event was held until 1947.

== Conference winners ==
This is a partial list of conference champions from the 1931 season.

Conference	Regular season winner
Big Nine	Illinois
Big Six	Missouri/Oklahoma
CIBA	Stanford
EIBL	Penn
Pacific Coast Conference North	Washington
Southern Conference	Auburn/North Carolina
Southwest Conference	Texas A&M

== Conference standings ==
The following is an incomplete list of conference standings:

1931 Eastern Intercollegiate Baseball League baseball standings
	Conf.						Overall
Team	W		L		T	PCT	W		L		T	PCT
Penn ‍†‍‍	8	–	1	–	0	.889	14	–	6	–	0	.700
Columbia ‍‍‍	5	–	3	–	0	.625	12	–	9	–	1	.568
Yale ‍‍‍	7	–	5	–	0	.583	14	–	9	–	0	.609
Dartmouth ‍‍‍	4	–	6	–	0	.400	7	–	12	–	0	.368
Princeton ‍‍‍	3	–	5	–	0	.375	10	–	17	–	1	.375
Cornell ‍‍‍	2	–	7	–	0	.222	5	–	14	–	0	.263
† – Conference champion
