= Wittliff =

Wittliff is a surname. Notable people with the surname include:

- James Lamar Wittliff (born 1938), American Biochemist
- Phil Wittliff (born 1948), American ice hockey player, coach, and executive
- William D. Wittliff (1940–2019), American screenwriter, author, and photographer
