= Texas Valley League =

Minor baseball league

- Formerly: Gulf Coast League
- Classification: Independent (1901–1908); Class D (1927–1928, 1938)
- Sport: Minor League Baseball
- First season: 1901
- Folded: 1938
- President: Guy Airey (1938)
- No. of teams: 9
- Country: United States of America
- Most titles: 1 Corpus Christi Seahawks (1927); Harlingen Hubs (1938)

The Texas Valley League was a minor league baseball league that played in three different periods. The league was an Independent league from 1901 to 1908 and a Class D level league from 1927 to 1928 and in 1938. In every season of play, the Texas Valley League consisted of teams based exclusively in Texas.

== History ==
The Texas Valley League began play as an Independent league in the 1901 season and played continuously through 1908. The exact records and teams in the seasons from 1901 to 1908 are unknown.

In 1927, the Texas Valley League reformed and began play as a four–team Class D level league, evolving from the 1926 Gulf Coast League. The 1927 Texas Valley League members were the Corpus Christi Seahawks, Edinburg Bobcats, Laredo Oilers and Mission Grapefruiters. All four teams had played the previous season as the only members of the 1926 Gulf Coast League. The Texas Valley League began play on April 5, 1927, with the Corpus Christi Seahawks winning the first–half standings. Laredo won the second–half standings. Mission had the best overall record. In the Final, Corpus Christi Swept Laredo in three games.

The Texas Valley League continued play as a four–team league in 1928 before folding. The Corpus Christi Seahawks and Mission Grapefruits were joined by teams from Brownsville, Texas and McAllen, Texas in the Class D level league, as Edinburg and Laredo had folded. The 1928 season standings are unknown. The league folded after the 1928 season.

The Texas Valley League formed for a final season in 1938, playing as a six–team Class D level league. The Brownsville Charros, Corpus Christi Spudders, Harlingen Hubs, McAllen Packers, Refugio Oilers and Taft Cardinals teams made up the 1938 league franchises. The league president was Guy Airey. Corpus Christi won the regular season pennant with a 92–44 record, finishing 8.5 games ahead of second place Harlingen. In the first round of the playoffs, the Harlingen Hubs defeated the Taft Cardinals 3 games to 0 and the Corpus Christi Spudders defeated the Refugio Oilers 3 games to 2. In the Finals, the Harlingen Hubs won the championship, defeating Corpus Christi in a four–game sweep. The Texas Valley League permanently folded after the 1938 season.

== Cities represented ==
- Brownsville, Texas: Brownsville (1928); Brownsville Charros (1938)
- Corpus Christi, Texas: Corpus Christi Seahawks (1927–1928); Corpus Christi Spudders (1938)
- Edinburg, Texas: Edinburg Bobcats (1927)
- Harlingen, Texas: Harlingen Hubs (1938)
- Laredo, Texas: Laredo Oilers (1927)
- McAllen, Texas: McAllen (1928), McAllen Packers (1938)
- Mission, Texas: Mission Grapefruiters (1927–1928)
- Refugio, Texas: Refugio Oilers (1938)
- Taft, Texas: Taft Cardinals (1938)

== Standings & statistics ==
=== 1901 to 1908 Texas Valley League ===
The standings in the 1901 to 1908 seasons are unknown.

=== 1927 Texas Valley League ===
Team standings	W	L	PCT	GB	Managers
Mission Grapefruiters	62	55	.529	–	Harry Davis / Ed Marburger
Corpus Christi Seahawks	63	56	.523	½	Jimmy Payton
Edinburg Bobcats	57	58	.496	4	Roy Morton / Cam Hill
Laredo Oilers	53	66	.445	10	Nate Smith / Tex Wisterzil

Corpus Christi won first half standings. Laredo won second half standings.
Playoff: Corpus Christi 3 games, Laredo 0.

Player statistics
Player	Team	Stat	Tot	Player	Team	Stat	Tot
Garland Orr	Mission	BA	.372	Herbert Pyle	Mission	W	15
Les Mallon	Mission	Runs	94	Glenn Brown	Corpus Christi	W	15
Les Mallon	Mission	Hits	162	Fay Haddock	Laredo	SO	1.13
Jack Holloway	Mission	HR	17	R.S. "Red" Hill	Laredo	Pct	.750; 12–4

=== 1928 Texas Valley League ===
The 1928 Texas Valley League standings are unknown.

=== 1938 Texas Valley League ===
Team standings	W	L	PCT	GB	Managers
Corpus Christi Spudders	92	44	.677	–	Rod Whitney
Harlingen Hubs	84	53	.613	8½	Jake Atz
Taft Cardinals	68	67	.504	23½	John Morrow / Herbert Fash
Refugio Oilers	67	67	.500	24	Carlisle Littlejohn
McAllen Packers	65	72	.474	27½	Skipper Friday / Walter Kopp
Brownsville Charros	30	103	.226	60½	Ed Konetchy / Jimmie Wilson / Brooks Conover / Dutch Hoffman / Vernon Deck

Playoffs: Harlingen Hubs 3 games, Taft Cardinals 0; Corpus Christi Spudders 3 games, Refugio Oilers 2.
Finals: Harlingen Hubs 4 games Corpus Christi Spudders 0.

Player statistics
Player	Team	Stat	Tot	Player	Team	Stat	Tot
Manuel Cortinas	Corpus Christi	BA	.380	Gene Hinrichs	Harlingen	W	27
George Hausmann	Corpus Christi	Runs	157	Gene Hinrichs	Harlingen	SO	223
K. Steve Carter	Harlingen	Hits	207	Tom Finger	Corpus Christi	ERA	2.75
Manuel Cortinas	Corpus Christi	HR	20	Tom Finger	Corpus Christi	PCT	.815 22–5
Leo Najo	McAllen	HR	20				
Bill McClaren	Harlingen	HR	20				
Kirby Jordan	McAllen	HR	20				
Bill McClaren	Harlingen	RBI	151				
