= Taft Cardinals =

- 1938; Taft, Texas

Minor league affiliations
- Class: Class D (1938)
- League: Texas Valley League (1938)

Major league affiliations
- Team: None

Minor league titles
- League titles: None
- Wild card berths (1): 1938

Team data
- Name: Taft Cardinals (1938)
- Ballpark: Taft High School Field (1938)

The Taft Cardinals were a minor league baseball franchise based in Taft, Texas. In 1938, the Cardinals played as members of the Class D level Texas Valley League in their only season of minor league play, qualifying for the playoffs.

Taft hosted home minor league games at the Taft High School Field.

== History ==
The Taft Cardinals began minor league play in the 1938 Texas Valley League. After a nine-season hiatus, the 1938 Texas Valley League reformed as a six–team Class D level league, with the Brownsville Charros, Corpus Christi Spudders, Harlingen Hubs, McAllen Packers and Refugio Oilers joining Taft as the league members.

In their opening game, Taft was defeated by the Brownsville Charros by the score of 8–5.

After beginning league play on April 14, 1938, the Cardinals finished the season in third place, qualifying for the Texas Valley League playoffs, in their only season of play. Taft finished the 1938 regular season with a record of 68–67, playing under managers Leroy "Cowboy" Jones and John Morrow. Taft finished 23.5 games behind the first place Corpus Christi Spudders in the final regular season standings. In the 1938 playoffs, the Cardinals lost in first round, as the Harlingen Hubs swept Taft in three games.

Future major league players made an impact for Taft, as Jack Creel led Taft with a 15–7 record and Fats Dantonio hit .324 in 349 at bats for the 1938 Cardinals.

Following the 1938 season, the Texas Valley League permanently folded. Taft, Texas has not hosted another minor league team.

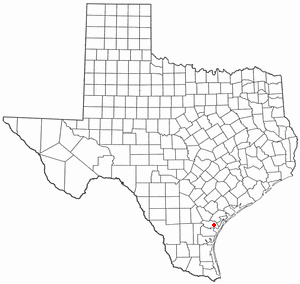
Taft, Texas location

=== St. Louis Cardinals non–affiliation ===
While the 1938 Taft Cardinals franchise is not referenced as being an official affiliate of the St. Louis Cardinals, the Taft roster was filled almost exclusively with St. Louis Cardinals' affiliate players and the franchise used the corresponding moniker. On March 23, 1938, the St. Louis Cardinals were fined for having multiple minor league team affiliates in certain leagues and 74 Cardinal minor league players were declared free agents in the ruling by baseball commissioner Kenesaw Mountain Landis. The Cardinals and minor league teams involved were also fined for not notifying Landis of existing "working agreements". Taft player Jack Creel was future St Louis Cardinals player and was channeled in 1939 with Fats Dantonio from Taft to the St. Louis Cardinals' affiliate New Iberia Cardinals. Taft Cardinals player Charles Flash played for St. Louis Cardinals' affiliates in both 1937 and 1939 and numerous other Taft teammates had played for 1937 Cardinals' affiliates before joining the Taft roster. Nearly all other 1938 Taft Cardinal players who continued to play minor league baseball in 1939, continued their careers with 1939 St. Louis Cardinals' affiliate teams. Manager John Morrow went on to manage the Johnson City Cardinals, who were a St. Louis Cardinals affiliate.

== The ballpark ==
The Taft Cardinals were noted to have played minor league home games at the Taft High School Field. In 1938, the ballpark had a capacity of 1,200 and dimensions of (Left, Center, Right): 315–390–315. Today, Taft High School is located at 502 Rincon Road in Taft, Texas.

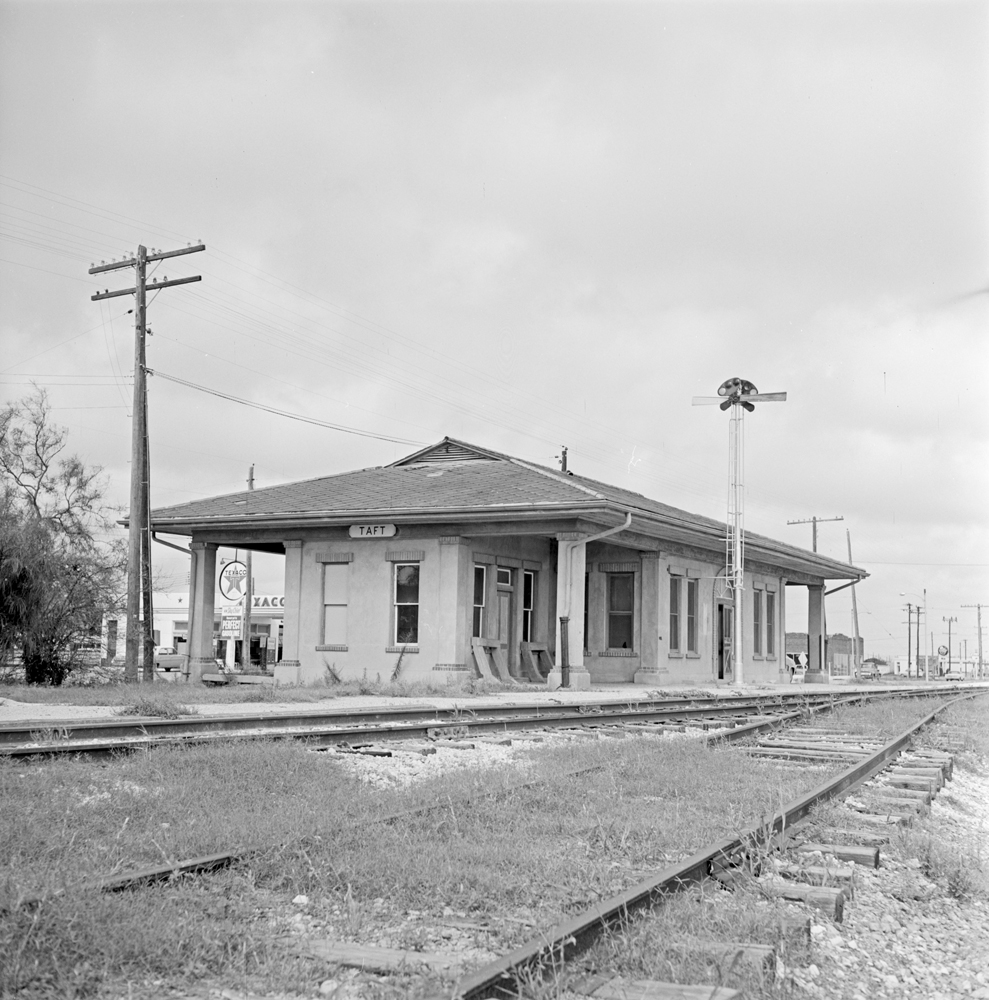
(1962) Texas and New Orleans, Southern Pacific Railroad Station. Taft, Texas

== Year–by–year records ==
Year	Record	Finish	Manager	Playoffs/Notes
1938	68–67	3rd	Leroy "Cowboy" Jones / John Morrow	Lost in 1st round

== Notable alumni ==
- Jack Creel (1938)
- Fats Dantonio (1938)
- Taft Cardinals players
