= Refugio, Texas =

- Town
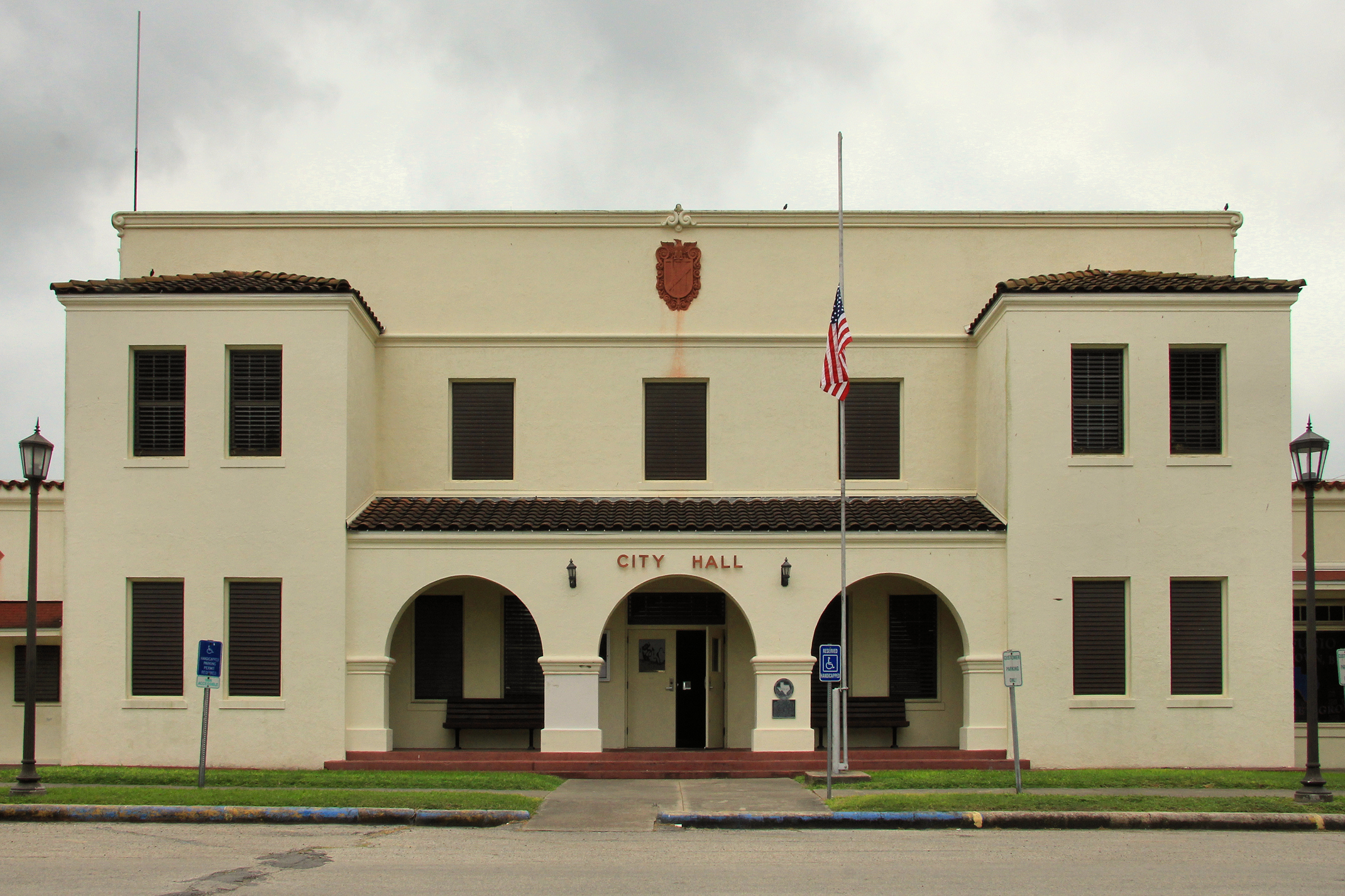
- Refugio City Hall

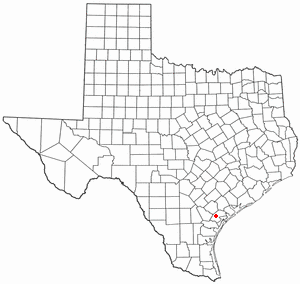
- Location of Refugio, Texas

- Coordinates: 28°18′21″N 97°16′29″W
- Country: United States
- State: Texas
- County: Refugio
- Incorporated: February 1, 1842

Area
  - Total: 1.57 sq mi (4.07 km^{2})
  - Land: 1.57 sq mi (4.07 km^{2})
  - Water: 0 sq mi (0.00 km^{2})
- Elevation: 46 ft (14 m)

Population (2020)
  - Total: 2,712
  - Density: 1,730/sq mi (666/km^{2})
- Time zone: UTC-6 (Central (CST))
  - Summer (DST): UTC-5 (CDT)
- ZIP Code: 78377
- Area code: 361
- FIPS code: 48-61436
- GNIS feature ID: 1345013

Refugio (/rɪfˈjʊər.i.oʊ/ rif-YOOR-ee-oh) is a town in Refugio County, of which it is the county seat, in the U.S. state of Texas. The population was 2,712 as of the 2020 Census. Refugio is the birthplace of Baseball Hall of Fame member Nolan Ryan.

== History ==
Before Spanish colonization, the site of present-day Refugio was a seasonal camp of the Karankawa people, particularly the Copane band. Spanish authorities knew the area by the mid-18th century, and José de Escandón considered it for a settlement and presidio.

Spain established Mission Nuestra Señora del Refugio on February 4, 1793 near Goff Bayou to minister to the Karankawa. After raids and supply issues, the mission moved to Mosquitos Creek in 1794 and then to its final location on the Mission River-the present townsite-on January 10, 1795. It was the last mission founded in Texas and was secularized in 1830.

During the Mexican era, the Power and Hewetson Irish colony received an empresario contract in 1828; its territory was expanded in 1829 and granted the former mission lands in 1831. The colony’s center developed around the mission, and in 1834 lots were platted for the Villa de Refugio. Many Irish families from County Wexford arrived that year, joining Mexican settlers.

The Battle of Refugio (March 12–15, 1836) occurred during José de Urrea’s coastal campaign of the Texas Revolution. Texian detachments under Amon B. King and William Ward fought Urrea’s forces near the mission, resulting in a Mexican victory. Many Texians captured at Refugio were executed later in the Goliad massacre.

Refugio was first incorporated in 1837 but lacked effective government until re-incorporation in 1842 under the Republic of Texas. In 1869, the county seat briefly moved to St. Mary’s and then Rockport; after Aransas County was created in 1871, Refugio regained its status as county seat.

The arrival of the St. Louis, Brownsville and Mexico Railway in 1905 spurred growth, followed by the discovery of oil in Refugio County in 1928. Major fields such as the Tom O'Connor Field made the area a significant petroleum producer. Ranching also shaped the region, led by Irish immigrant Thomas O’Connor, whose family holdings became among the largest in Texas.

Religious continuity persisted at the mission site. The current Our Lady of Refuge Catholic Church was completed in 1901 and remains a local landmark.

Refugio has endured major storms, including Hurricane Carla in 1961, which caused widespread damage across the Texas coast.

== Geography ==
Refugio is located at 28°18′21″N 97°16′29″W (28.305812, −97.274594). According to the United States Census Bureau, the town has a total area of 1.6 square miles (4.0 km^{2}), all land.

=== Climate ===
The climate in this area is characterized by hot, humid summers and generally mild to cool winters. According to the Köppen climate classification, Refugio has a humid subtropical climate, Cfa on climate maps.

== Demographics ==
Historical population
Census	Pop.	Note	%±
1880	455		—
1910	773		—
1920	933		20.7%
1930	2,019		116.4%
1940	4,077		101.9%
1950	4,666		14.4%
1960	4,944		6.0%
1970	4,340		−12.2%
1980	3,898		−10.2%
1990	3,158		−19.0%
2000	2,941		−6.9%
2010	2,890		−1.7%
2020	2,712		−6.2%
U.S. Decennial Census

=== 2020 census ===
Refugio racial composition (NH = Non-Hispanic) (Note: Note: the US Census treats Hispanic/Latino as an ethnic category. This table excludes Latinos from the racial categories and assigns them to a separate category. Hispanics/Latinos can be of any race.)
Race	Number	Percentage
White (NH)	791	29.17%
Black or African American (NH)	298	10.99%
Native American or Alaska Native (NH)	9	0.33%
Asian (NH)	10	0.37%
Some Other Race (NH)	3	0.11%
Mixed/Multi-Racial (NH)	53	1.95%
Hispanic or Latino	1,548	57.08%
Total	2,712	

As of the 2020 United States census, there were 2,712 people, 957 households, and 598 families residing in the town.

=== 2000 census ===
As of the census of 2000, 2,941 people, 1,128 households, and 788 families resided in the town. The population density was 1,880.7 inhabitants per square mile (726.1/km^{2}). The 1,312 housing units averaged 839.0 per square mile (324.7/km^{2}). The racial makeup of the town was 74.53% White, 13.40% African American, 0.51% Native American, 0.51% Asian, 9.48% from other races, and 1.56% from two or more races. Hispanics or Latinos of any race were 44.30% of the population.

Of the 1,128 households, 30.9% had children under the age of 18 living with them, 46.5% were married couples living together, 18.2% had a female householder with no husband present, and 30.1% were notfamilies; 27.3% of the households were made up of individuals, and 13.8% had someone living alone who was 65 years of age or older. The average household size was 2.55, and the average family size was 3.08.

In the town, the population was distributed as 26.7% under the age of 18, 8.1% from 18 to 24, 25.1% from 25 to 44, 22.5% from 45 to 64, and 17.6% who were 65 years of age or older. The median age was 38 years. For every 100 females, there were 90.9 males. For every 100 females age 18 and over, there were 85.3 males. The median income for a household in the town was $26,719, and for a family was $32,237. Males had a median income of $33,021 versus $15,549 for females. The per capita income for the town was $13,523. About 16.8% of families and 21.1% of the population were below the poverty line, including 26.7% of those under age 18 and 20.9% of those age 65 or over.

== Notable people ==
- Rocky Bridges, Major League Baseball (MLB) infielder
- Dan Firova, MLB catcher, Washington Nationals bullpen coach, and Houston Astros coach (2022 World Series Win)
- Joseph L. Galloway, American newspaper correspondent and columnist
- Kim Henkel, co-writer, with Tobe Hooper, of the original film The Texas Chainsaw Massacre
- Kermit Oliver, painter
- Allison Paige, country music singer-songwriter
- Nolan Ryan, MLB pitcher, all-time Major League leader in strikeouts, and member of the Baseball Hall of Fame
- Jack Starrett, film actor and director

== Education ==
The Town of Refugio is served by the Refugio Independent School District.

== Sports ==
The 1938 Refugio Oilers played minor league baseball as members of the Class D level Texas Valley League. The Brownsville Charros, Corpus Christi Spudders, Harlingen Hubs, McAllen Packers and Taft Cardinals joined Refugio in the league, which began play on April 14, 1938.

In 1947, future Baseball Hall of Famer Nolan Ryan was born in Refugio, though his family would move to Alvin, Texas, when Ryan was an infant.

== Hurricane Harvey ==
On August 23, 2017, Governor Greg Abbott published an emergency evacuation for the town of Refugio, following his state of emergency announcement on the state of Texas. On August 25, at peak intensity, Hurricane Harvey hit Refugio, causing significant damage to businesses and homes along US-77. Wind speeds were clocked up to 130 mph when the storm hit the town. Many professional storm trackers were storm chasing in Refugio during the peak of the storm, witnessing and documenting the experience. Several businesses in Refugio closed permanently in the aftermath of Harvey, and the town was without utilities for months.
