= Cliff Garrison =

American baseball player (1906–1994)

- Garrison, c. 1928
- Pitcher
- Born: August 13, 1906 (Note: Garrison's listed date of birth (August 13, 1906) is per Retrosheet and Baseball-Reference.com; it also appears on his grave marker. Both his draft registration card of October 1940, which he signed, and his entry in the Social Security Death Index list his date of birth as August 13, 1905.); Belmont, Oklahoma, U.S.
- Died: August 25, 1994 (aged 88); Woodland, California, U.S.
- Batted: Right Threw: Right

MLB debut
- April 16, 1928, for the Boston Red Sox

Last MLB appearance
- July 2, 1928, for the Boston Red Sox

MLB statistics
- Win–loss record: 0–0
- Earned run average: 7.88
- Strikeouts: 0
- Stats at Baseball Reference

Teams
- Boston Red Sox (1928)

Clifford William Garrison (August 13, 1906 – August 25, 1994) was an American professional baseball pitcher who played in six games for the 1928 Boston Red Sox of Major League Baseball (MLB). Listed at 6 feet 0 inches (1.83 m) and 180 pounds (82 kg), he batted and threw right-handed.

== Biography ==
Garrison's minor league baseball history is incomplete. He was originally signed by the New York Yankees in February 1926 after playing baseball at Tempe High School in Arizona, where he started as a catcher and outfielder before becoming a pitcher. In 1927, he played with the Edinburg Bobcats of the Texas Valley League, compiling an 11–8 win–loss record. It is unclear when Garrison moved on from the Yankees' organization; in January 1928, he was reported to be "another recruit" of the Boston Red Sox for the upcoming season.

Garrison appeared in six games for the Red Sox in 1928, a team that finished with a 57–96 record. He made his major league debut on April 16, pitching two innings of relief against the Yankees in a home game at Fenway Park. Entering the game in the top of the eighth inning with the Yankees holding a 7–2 lead, Garrison held the Yankees scoreless while allowing two hits in two innings. Three of the batters that Garrison faced were future Baseball Hall of Fame inductees: Leo Durocher (who singled), Babe Ruth (who doubled), and Lou Gehrig (who hit a sacrifice fly). Garrison made six total appearances with the Red Sox; two in April, two in May, and one each in June and July. All of his appearances came in relief; he did not earn a win or a loss or record a strikeout, while allowing 14 earned runs in 16 innings pitched for a 7.88 earned run average (ERA). Boston released Garrison on July 11, optioning him to the Portland Mariners of the New England League.

Whether Garrison played for Portland is unclear; by the end of the 1928 season he was pitching for the Pittsfield Hillies of the Eastern League. Garrison started the 1929 season with Pittsfield, was released, then joined the Mesa Jewels of the Arizona State League. After being released by Mesa in early July 1929, Garrison went on to play semi-professional baseball in California into the 1930s.

After his baseball career, Garrison worked in law enforcement as a deputy sheriff in Yolo County, California, and later served as chief of police of Woodland, California, from 1939 to 1943. Garrison, who grew up in Meeker, Oklahoma, died in Woodland in 1994.
