= Alvia Wardlaw =

American art scholar (born 1947)

- Born: November 5, 1947 (age 78); Atlanta, Georgia, U.S.
- Education: Wellesley College NYU University of Texas Austin
- Occupations: Art scholar and professor
- Employer: Texas Southern University

Alvia J. Wardlaw (born November 5, 1947) is an American art scholar, and one of the country's top experts on African-American art. She is curator and director of the University Museum at Texas Southern University, an institution central to the development of art by African Americans in Houston. She also is a professor of Art History at Texas Southern University. Wardlaw is a member of the Scholarly Advisory Council of the National Museum of African American History and Culture, and co-founded the National Alliance of African and African American Art Support groups in 1998. Wardlaw was University of Texas at Austin's first African-American PhD in Art History.

== Career ==
From 1995 to 2009, Wardlaw was curator of Modern and Contemporary Art at the Museum of Fine Arts, Houston, where she organized more than 75 exhibitions on African and African-American art. She was adjunct curator of African-American Art at the Dallas Museum of Art in 1994. Her exhibition The Quilts of Gee's Bend, a collection of quilts by outstanding quilters from Alabama, broke attendance records at major museums across the 11 cities to which it traveled and was one of the most talked-about museum shows of 2002 in America and beyond. She has presented exhibitions that added to the American art canon the work of major, previously undercelebrated African-American artists, in particular John Biggers, Thornton Dial and Kermit Oliver. Her own photographs were also shown across Texas.

== Personal life ==
Born in Atlanta, Georgia, she grew up and lives in Third Ward, Houston, Texas.

== Education ==
Wardlaw received a B.A. degree in Art History from Wellesley College in 1969. In 1986, she earned an M.A. degree in Art History from the New York University Institute of Fine Arts. In 1996, she received a Ph.D. degree in Art History from the University of Texas at Austin.

== Exhibitions curated ==
- 2006: Thorton Dial in the 21st Century, Museum of Fine Arts, Houston, exhibit and catalogue
- 2002–2006: The Quilts of Gees Bend – 11 cities
- Our New Day Begun: African American Artists Entering the Millennium, exhibition catalogue, LBJ Library and Museum
- Roy DeCarava: Photographs, exhibition and exhibition catalogue, The Museum of Fine Arts, Houston
- Ceremonies and Visions: The Art of John Biggers
- Homecoming. African American Family History in Georgia
- John Biggers: Bridges
- 1995: John Biggers: View from the Upper Room, Museum of Fine Arts, Houston
- 2005: Notes from a Child's Odyssey: The Art of Kermit Oliver, Museum of Fine Arts Houston
- 2008: Houston Collects: African American Art, Museum of Fine Arts, Houston

Wardlaw has historicized John Biggers' art philosophy, based in large part on his travels to Africa and his celebration of the African-American community, his legacy and impact on student artists who studied with him, and his impact upon the modern art world. She has mentored countless students of color to pursue careers in the museum field, ranging from curatorial to conservation positions.

== Writing ==
- Dominique de Menil asked her to write an essay for the groundbreaking exhibition The De Luxe Show, August 22, 1971, pairing the works of notable white and black artists.
- The exhibition Handcrafted, an early show at the Studio Museum [in Harlem, 1972].
- The Art of John Biggers: View from the Upper Room (with essays by Edmund Barry Gaither, Alison de Lima Greene, and Robert Farris Thompson), Museum of Fine Arts (Houston, TX), 1995.
- (Editor) Grant Hill, Something All Our Own: The Grant Hill Collection of African American Art, Duke University Press (Durham, NC), 2004.
- Notes from a Child's Odyssey: The Art of Kermit Oliver, Museum of Fine Arts (Houston, TX), 2005.
- Charles Alston, Pomegranate (Petaluma, CA), 2007.
- Also author of Black Art, Ancestral Legacy: The African Impulse in African-American Art, as an accompaniment to the exhibition. Contributor of articles and poetry to various publications, including The Black Scholar.
- Collecting African American Art: the Museum of Fine Arts Houston, 2009.

== Awards ==
- Fulbright Fellowship in West Africa, Liberia, Sierra Leone and Senegal in 1984
- Fulbright Award for study in Tanzania, East Africa in 1997
- Senior Fellow for the 2001 American Leadership Forum
- Texas Women's Hall of Fame in 1994
- Award of Merit from the University of Texas at Austin
- Ethos Founders Award from Wellesley College
- African American Living Legend by African-American News and Issues
- Texas Southern University's Research Scholar of the Year in 2009.
- In addition, Black Art Ancestral Legacy was named Best Exhibition of 1990 by D Magazine, and The Quilts of Gee's Bend received the International Association of Art Critics Award in 2003.
