= East Elementary School =

East Elementary School can refer to several schools in the United States.

- East Elementary at J. A. Rogers in Kansas City, Missouri
- East Elementary School in Littleton, Colorado
- East Elementary School in Mountain Home, Idaho
- East Elementary School in Portland, Indiana
- East Elementary School in Taft, Texas
- East Elementary School in New Canaan, Connecticut
