= Mission Grapefruiters =

- 1926–1928; Mission, Texas

Minor league affiliations
- Class: Class D (1926–1928)
- League: Gulf Coast League (1926); Texas Valley League (1927–1928)

Major league affiliations
- Team: None

Minor league titles
- League titles (0): None
- Conference titles (1): 1927

Team data
- Name: Mission Grapefruiters (1926–1928)
- Ballpark: Legion Park (1926–1928)

The Mission Grapefruiters were a minor league baseball team based in Mission, Texas. The Grapefruiters played as members of the Class D level Gulf Coast League in 1926 and Texas Valley League from 1927 to 1928, winning the 1927 league pennant.

== History ==
The "Mission Grapefruiters" were formed in 1926, during the season. On July 16, 1926, the Kingsville Jerseys of the Class D level Gulf Coast League, relocated to Mission, Texas. Kingsville had a 14–26 record at the time of the move. The Kingsville/Mission team ended the season with an overall record of 46–52, after compiling a record of 32–26 while based in Mission. The team placed third in the four–team league under managers Tom Deering, Fred Paschal and Ed Marburger, finishing 12.0 games behind the first place Laredo Oilers in the final standings.

The "Grapefruiters" moniker corresponded to local industry, as Mission, Texas has long been home to agriculture and citrus juice production.

The Mission Grapefruiters continued play in a newly named league in 1927. The Texas Valley League formed as a four–team Class D level league, evolving from the 1926 Gulf Coast League, with the Corpus Christi Seahawks, Edinburg Bobcats, Laredo Oilers and Mission Grapefruits continuing play, as all four teams had finished the previous season as the only members of the 1926 Gulf Coast League. The Texas Valley League began play on April 5, 1927, with Mission playing at Laredo. The Mission Grapefruiters had the best overall regular season record, but the team missed the playoffs due to a split–season schedule in the league. With a record of 62–55, Mission placed first in the overall standings, playing the season under manager Ed Marburger. However, Mission missed the playoffs as the Corpus Christi Seahawks won the first–half standings and Laredo won the second–half standings. In the Final, Corpus Christi Swept Laredo in three games.

The Mission Grapefruiters played their final season in 1928. The Texas Valley League continued play as a four–team league as Mission and the Corpus Christi Seahawks were joined by teams from Brownsville, Texas and McAllen, Texas in the Class D level league. The 1928 season standings are unknown. The Texas Valley League permanently folded after the 1928 season.

The Texas Valley League never returned to minor league play. Mission, Texas has not hosted another minor league team.

== The ballpark ==
The Mission Grapefruiters hosted home games at Legion Park in Mission. That facility, not to be confused with the ballpark of the same name in nearby McAllen, Texas where the McAllen Palms played, was located on land donated by John H. Shary, a prominent local citrus grower and developer. Older maps show a city park with an American Legion Hall located on the northeast corner of the city across an irrigation canal approximately adjacent to the intersection of East 15th Street and St. Marie Avenue. The current address of this location is 1500 Kika de la Garza Loop, which is known as Lions Park and includes numerous recently refurbished recreational facilities including two lighted baseball fields.

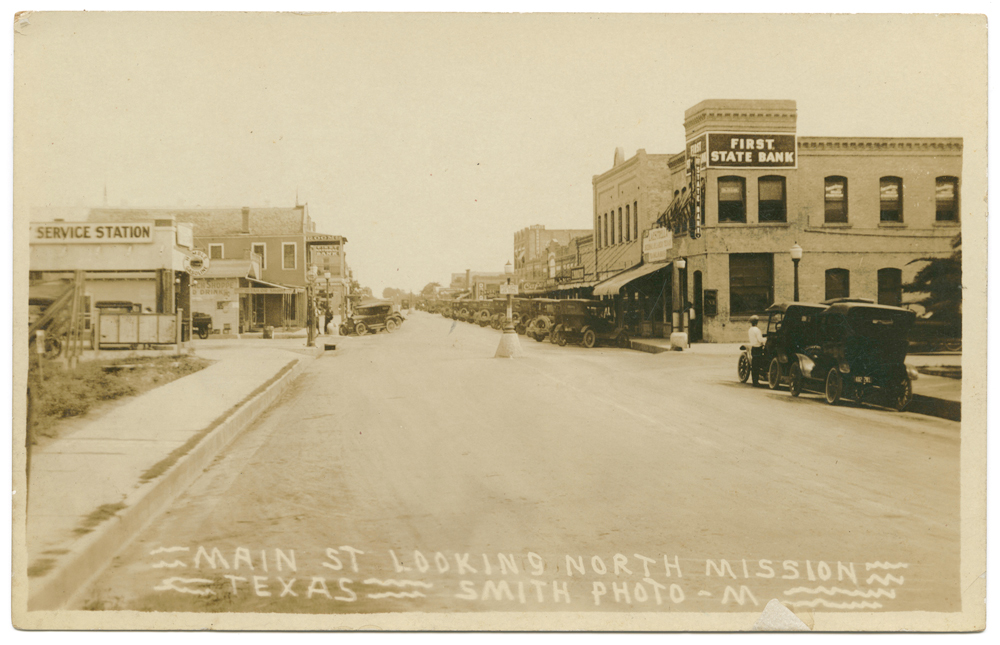
(1920's) Main Street. Mission, Texas

== Timeline ==
Year(s)	# Yrs.	Team	Level	League
1926	1	Mission Grapefruiters	Class D	Gulf Coast League
1927–1928	2	Mission Grapefruiters	Class D	Texas Valley League

== Year–by–year records ==
Year	Record	Finish	Manager	Playoffs/Notes
1926	46–52	3rd	Tom Deering / Fred Paschal / Ed Marburger	Kingsville (14–26) moved to Mission July 16
1927	62–55	1st	Ed Marburger	Did not qualify for playoff
1928	00–00	NA	NA	League records unknown

== Notable alumni ==
- Les Mallon (1927)

=== See also ===
Mission Grapefruiters players
