= Refugio Oilers =

- 1938; Refugio, Texas

Minor league affiliations
- Class: Class D (1938)
- League: Texas Valley League (1938)

Major league affiliations
- Team: None

Minor league titles
- League titles (0): None
- Wild card berths (1): 1938

Team data
- Name: Refugio Oilers (1938)
- Ballpark: Ryals Field (1938)

The Refugio Oilers were a minor league baseball team based in Refugio, Texas and Refugio County, Texas. Refugio is the birthplace of Baseball Hall of Fame member Nolan Ryan.

In 1938, the Oilers played as members of the Class D level Texas Valley League, qualifying for the playoffs.

The Refugio Oilers team hosted home games at Ryals Field in their only season of minor league play. Today, the ballpark site is called "Lions City Park"/"Shelley Park."

== History ==
The Refugio "Oilers" began minor league play as members of the 1938 Texas Valley League. After a nine–season hiatus, the Texas Valley League reformed as a six–team Class D level league, with the Brownsville Charros, Corpus Christi Spudders, Harlingen Hubs, McAllen Packers and Taft Cardinals joining Refugio as league members, beginning play on April 14, 1938.

The Refugio "Oilers" nickname is reflective of the oil and gas production in Refugio and the surrounding region. Oil was first discovered in Refugio County in 1928, creating a population growth in the region.

The Oilers finished the regular 1938 season in fourth place, qualifying for the Texas Valley League playoffs, in their only season of play.

During the season, the Texas Valley League adopted a split–season schedule. On June 15, 1938, Refugio hosted Taft at home, losing by the score of 1–0. On June 17, after a rainout, Refugio and Taft played a day–night double header at Refugio, as Refugio defeated Taft 7–5 in the first game, before Taft took the night cap 17–9. On June 18, 1938, Refugio hosted Harlingen and lost 5–4, before defeating Harlingen twice: 6–3 on June 19 and 5–3 on June 20. On June 21, 1938, Refugio lost at Corpus Christi 5–1. Refugio was in fourth place with a 38–34 record on June 24, 1938, in the final first–half standings, following first place Corpus Christi, second place Harlingen and third place Taft.

Refugio ended the 1938 regular season with an overall record of 67–67, playing the season under manager Carlisle Littlejohn. The Oilers finished 24.0 games behind the first place Corpus Christi Spudders in the final regular season standings. In the 1938 playoffs, the Oilers lost in first round, as Corpus Christi defeated Refugio three games to two in the final games for the franchise.

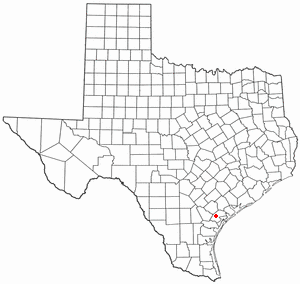
Location of Refugio, Texas.

In the final regular season standings, the Corpus Christi Spudders (92–44) finished 8.5 games ahead of the second place Harlingen Hubs (84–53), with Taft (68–67) and Refugio (67–67) finishing in third place and fourth place to qualify for the four–team playoffs. Corpus Christi had won the 1st half of the split–season schedule and tied with Harlingen for the second–half championship. The McAllen Packers (65–72) and Brownsville Charros (30–103) finished in fifth and sixth place. In the league finals, Harlingen defeated Corpus Christi to win the title. Both Harlingen (Detroit Tigers) and Corpus Christi (St. Louis Browns) were major league affiliate teams, the only two affiliated teams in the league.

Player/manager Carlisle Littlejohn hit. 345 to lead the Oilers in batting, while Clem Hausmann had a 16–13 record on the mound. Len Gilmore had a 5–4 record in 12 games.

Following the 1938 season, the Texas Valley League permanently folded. Refugio has not hosted another minor league team.

In 1947, Baseball Hall of Fame member Nolan Ryan was born in Refugio, before his family moved to Alvin, Texas when Nolan was a six weeks old.

== The ballpark ==
The Refugio Oilers hosted minor league home games at Ryals Field. The ballpark had a capacity of 1,200 and field dimensions of (Left, Center, Right): 308–420–308. Today, Ryals Field is called "Lions City Park"/"Shelley Park" and is still a public park with a ballfield and amenities, but was severely damaged by Hurricane Harvey in 2017.

== Year–by–year record ==
Year	Record	Finish	Manager	Playoffs/Notes
1938	67–67	4th	Carlisle Littlejohn	Lost in 1st round

== Notable alumni ==
- Len Gilmore (1938)
- Clem Hausmann (1938)
- Carlisle Littlejohn (1938)
- Baseball Hall of Fame member Nolan Ryan was born in Refugio. His family moved to Alvin when he was an infant.
- Refugio Oilers players
