= Taft High School (Texas) =

Location
- 502 Rincon Road; Taft, Texas 78390-2929; United States; 27.987473°N 97.388416°W

Information
- School type: Public high school
- Motto: "Working Towards The Future"
- School district: Taft Independent School District
- Principal: Angel Lopez
- Staff: 22.08 (FTE)
- Grades: 9-12
- Enrollment: 258 (2023-2024)
- Student to teacher ratio: 11.68
- Colors: Green, White, & Silver
- Athletics conference: UIL Class 3A
- Mascot: Greyhound
- Rival: Odem High School
- Website: hs.taftisd.net

Taft High School is a public high school in the city of Taft, Texas, United States. It is classified as a 3A school by the University Interscholastic League (UIL). It is a part of the Taft Independent School District located in east central San Patricio County. In 2013, the school was rated "Met Standard" by the Texas Education Agency.

== Extracurricular activities ==
Taft participates in numerous activities mostly as part of University Interscholastic League in District 30 2A, after being realigned from District 30 3A following the 2003-2004 school year. Taft is the second largest school in District 30, behind George West High School. It has a branch of the National Honor Society and an active student council.

== Sports/athletics ==
Through UIL, Taft participates in American football, cross country, volleyball, basketball, baseball, softball, track and field, and golf. Taft also participates in powerlifting through the Texas High School Powerlifting Association. The varsity basketball team has been state ranked twice.

== Academic competitions ==
Taft participates in the majority of UIL events.

=== Computer science ===
The two year district champion (2005, 2006) Computer Science team also competes in hands-on Texas Computer Educator Association competition.

=== Robotics ===
In 2007, Taft High School participated for the first time in the BEST Robotics competition.

== Theatre ==
The school holds an annual talent show and participates in one act play competition.

== Band ==
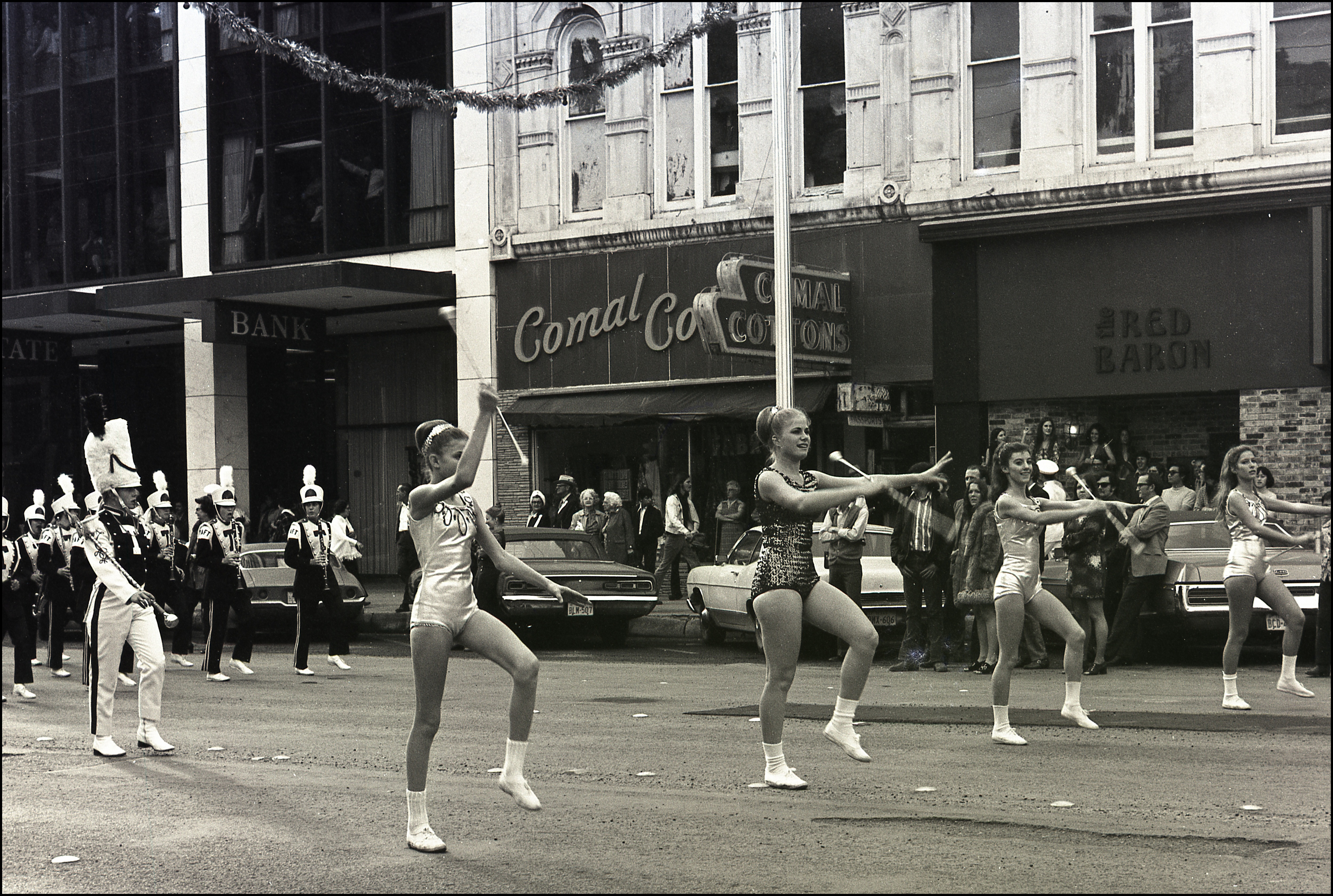
Taft High School Band marching in Governor Dolph Briscoe's inaugural parade, 1973

The "Band with Pride", Taft High School Band had received 21 consecutive UIL sweepstakes until the 2006-2007 school year, which entails receiving a first division rating in marching, concert performance, and sight reading. Most years it attends three Battle of the Bands-style pre-UIL competitions. Band members are also encouraged to participate in try-outs for All-Region, All-State, and All-State Jazz bands created by the Association of Texas Small School Bands. Every third year the band travels to Florida to perform in Walt Disney World's Magic Music Days.

=== Winterguard ===
The band includes an active winter guard, under director Meisha Hinojosa, that has placed in state competition in recent years, with many of its members also placing in State Solo and Ensemble competitions. In 2007-2008, the Taft Ultimate Impact Winterguard won state in the Novice Red Division. In 2008-2009, the Winterguard won state in Scholastic A.
