= James Lamar Wittliff =

American biochemist and academic

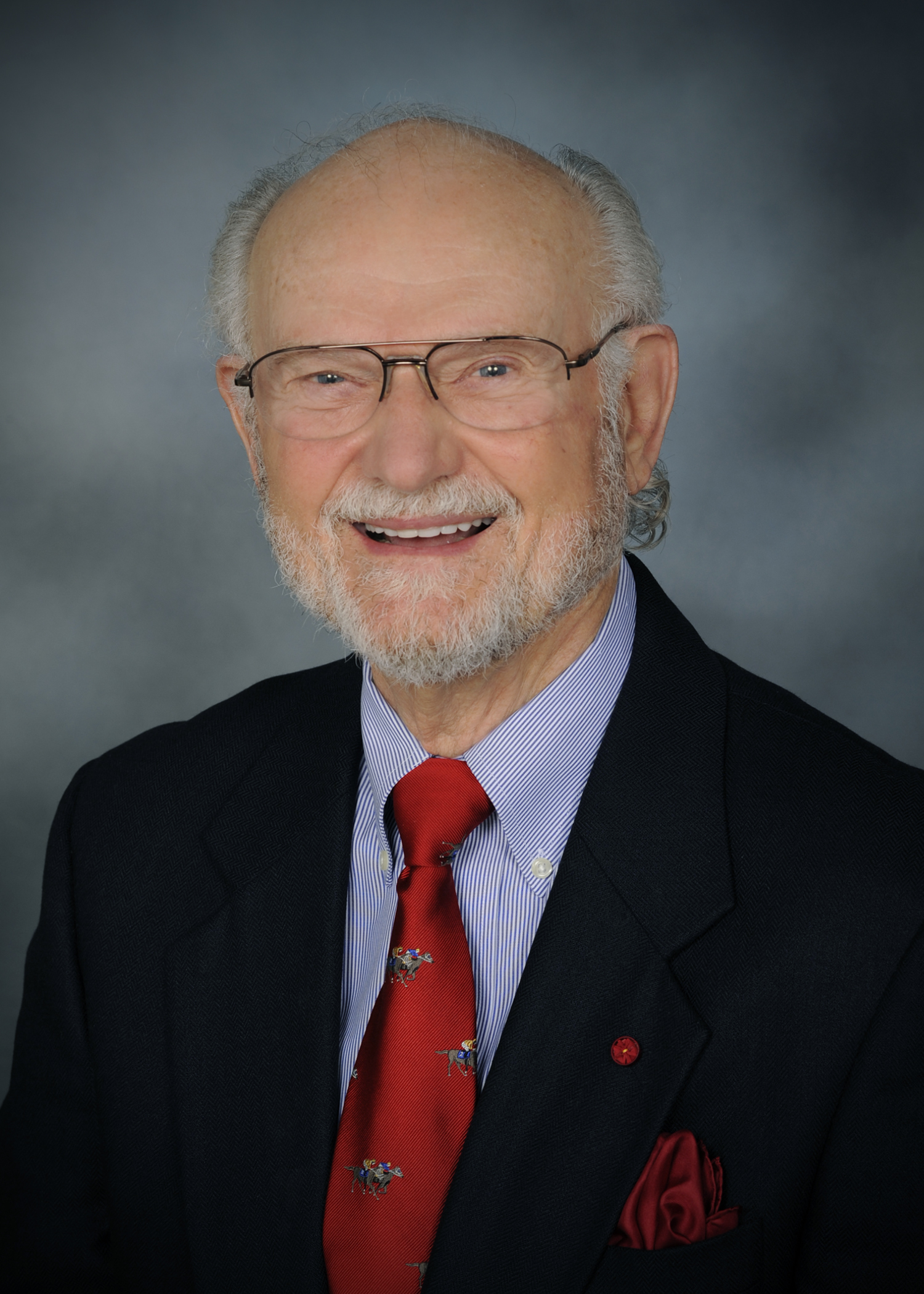
- Born: June 15, 1938; Taft, Texas
- Education: University of Texas at Austin (B. A., Ph. D.); Louisiana State University School of Medicine (M. S.)
- Known for: Creator of original QA surveys for Cooperative Clinical Trial Groups and the CAP for estrogen & progestin receptors and Co-Developer with NEN/DuPont of First FDA approved test kits of these cancer biomarkers
- Scientific career
- Fields: Biochemistry & Laboratory Medicine
- Workplaces: University of Rochester; University of Louisville
- Doctoral advisor: Robert L. Airth
- Notable students: David G. Gardner; Elizabeth S. Boylan de:Herbert Zech

James Lamar Wittliff (born June 15, 1938) also known as Jim Wittliff, is an American Biochemist and Professor Emeritus of Biochemistry & Molecular Genetics at the University of Louisville. He was Chairman of the Department of Biochemistry at the University of Louisville School of Medicine and Dentistry from 1976-1983. Wittliff's laboratory was designated the National Reference Facility by the National Cancer Institute for performing quality assurance surveys of receptor biomarker testing in breast cancers for cooperative clinical trial groups in the United States and Canada. He is the co-developer with NEN/DuPont of the 1st FDA approved tests for quantifying levels of estrogen and progestin receptor proteins.

== Early life and education ==
Wittliff was born on June 15, 1938 in Taft, Texas, of primarily Eastern European heritage. He is a 6th generation Texan and direct descendant of John Cryer (Crier), who was recruited to settle Texas as part of Stephen F. Austin's original 300 families. He, his brother Bill and their mother Laura moved to Blanco when they were boys.

In 1956, Wittliff graduated from San Marcos Academy, a college preparatory school that emphasized military discipline and training at the time. After 2 years of studying Chemical Engineering at Texas Tech University where he was a writer for The Daily Toreador and the National Publication Headquarters for the Arnold Air Society, he received a bachelor's degree in chemistry from University of Texas at Austin. While at UT, Wittliff worked at Clyde Campbell University Shop and modeled to support his education. Wittliff then earned an M. S. Degree in Biochemistry at Louisiana State University, School of Medicine.

Wittliff's family moved to the University of Texas at Austin where he was awarded an National Defense Education Act (NDEA) Fellowship, a program influenced by the launch of the Sputnik satellite by the Soviets. Wittliff received his Ph.D. degree at The University of Texas at Austin in 1967. He then received an NIH Postdoctoral Award to study in the Laboratory of Professor Francis T. Kenney in the Biology Division at Oak Ridge National Laboratory.

== Career ==
In 1969, Wittliff was recruited to the Department of Biochemistry at the University of Rochester School of Medicine as an assistant professor to work with Thomas C. Hall, a co-founder of the sub-specialty of medical oncology, to develop the new Cancer Center. In 1975, Wittliff was promoted to Associate Professor of Biochemistry and Head on the Section on Endocrine Biochemistry in the Cancer Center. In 1976, the University of Louisville School of Medicine and Dentistry recruited Wittliff as Chairman of the Department of Biochemistry, a position he would hold until 1983. He was also actively involved in the development of the first Cancer Center there. Although Wittliff began developing assays for breast cancer that quantified estrogen and progestin receptor proteins using radio-labeled steroid ligands while at Rochester, it was in Louisville that he collaborated with New England Nuclear (NEN, later NEN/DuPont) to develop the first FDA-Approved Assay Kits for quantifying these clinically relevant biomarkers

Upon arrival at the University of Louisville, Wittliff also established a clinical laboratory certified by the Commonwealth of Kentucky and CLIA to provide clinically relevant assays that quantified levels of estrogen and progestin receptor proteins for breast cancer management. This led Wittliff and his group to develop reference materials for these protein biomarkers and establishment of inter-laboratory Quality Assurance Programs for standardizing determinations of estrogen and progestin receptor proteins in breast cancer biopsies. Hundreds of laboratories engaged in cooperative clinical trials of breast cancer treatment by groups such as the NSABP, CALGB, ECOG, NCCTG, SECSG and SWOG participated in NCI-sponsored QA Surveys established by Wittliff. These QA programs were extended to the College of American Pathologists and international investigators to standardize determinations of these cancer biomarkers for routine assessment by all clinical laboratories. In 2024, Wittliff donated his de-identified research database and biorepository, which contains among the most highly quantified data sets of breast cancer biomarkers in the world, to the University of Texas at Austin, Dell Medical School, and Texas Advanced Computing Center. The irreplaceable materials are now preserved for other scientists to use for clinical trials in silico and to develop future companion diagnostic tests.

== Personal life ==
He is the older of two children of Laura (née Sachtleben) Wittliff and William Albert Wittliff. Wittliff's brother William D. Wittliff was a noted American screenwriter and photographer. Various of Wittliff's and his brother's childhood experiences during World War II were depicted in the film Raggedy Man (1981). While in college, Wittliff was a member of the Kappa Sigma fraternity and a long-time supporter of his adopted UofL chapter, and later received the John G. Tower Distinguished Alumnus Award. He married Theresa H. "Mitzie" Wittliff (née Hano) and had two sons. Later she also became his collaborator as well as his data and business manager of the clinical and quality assurance laboratories. Wittliff is widely known as an Oenophile having served as President of the Kentucky Chapters of the American Wine Society and of the American Institute of Wine & Food. He was also a founding member of the Kentucky Chapter of Confrérie de la Chaîne des Rôtisseurs.

== Awards and accolades ==
- 1984 Elected Fellow of the National Academy of Clinical Biochemistry (now FADLM)
- 1988 Distinguished Scientist Award, (Clinical Ligand Assay Society)
- 1990-92 Co-Editor-in-Chief, Clinical Biochemistry
- 1996-97 President, International Clinical Ligand Assay Society
- 1998 Doctor of Medicine honoris causa (Leopold-Franzens-Universität Innsbruck, Austria)
- 1998 University of Louisville Symposium honoring the career of James L. Wittliff
- 2001 American Association for Clinical Chemistry (Award for Outstanding Contributions to Clinical Chemistry in a Selected Area of Research)
- 2001 American Association for Clinical Chemistry (Hall of Fame recognition)
- 2002 Interagency Coordinating Committee on the Validation of Alternative Methods/ National Toxicology Program Interagency Center for the Evaluation of Alternative Toxicological Methods- Expert Panel
- 2004 Goldsmith Research Excellence Award, American Cancer Society, Kentucky Division
- 2008 President's Award for Career Achievements: Outstanding Scholarship, Research and Creative Activity, University of Louisville
- 2011 Interagency Coordinating Committee on the Validation of Alternative Methods/ National Toxicology Program Independent Scientific Peer Review Panel for the Evaluation of the LUMI-CELL® ER (BG1Luc ER TA) Test Method
- 2012 The CPT Paul W. Peña Outstanding Alumni Award - San Marcos Academy, San Marcos, TX
- 2014 Morton K. Schwartz Award (for Significant Contributions in Cancer Research Diagnostics American Association for Clinical Chemistry)
- 2015–Present: Wittliff Lecture Series at San Marcos Academy honoring his career contributions
- 2021 John G. Tower Distinguished Alumni Award, Texas Tech University, Kappa Sigma Fraternity
