= Taft Independent School District =

School district in Texas, United States

Address
- 400 College Street Taft, Texas, 78390; United States

District information
- Grades: PK–12
- Schools: 3
- NCES District ID: 4842060

Students and staff
- Students: 836 (2023–2024)
- Teachers: 63.02 (on an FTE basis)
- Student–teacher ratio: 13.27:1

Other information
- Website: www.taftisd.net

Taft Independent School District is a school district serving Taft, Texas (USA).

In addition to Taft, the district also serves the unincorporated community of Taft Southwest

In 2009, the school district was rated "academically acceptable" by the Texas Education Agency.

== List of Schools ==
- Taft High School (Grades 9-12)
- Taft Junior High School (Grades 6-8)
- Woodrow Petty Elementary School (Grades K-5)

== See also ==
- List of school districts in Texas
