= Edinburg Bobcats =

- 1926–1927; Edinburg, Texas

Minor league affiliations
- Class: Class D (1926–1927)
- League: Gulf Coast League (1926); Texas Valley League (1927)

Major league affiliations
- Team: None

Minor league titles
- League titles (1): 1926
- Conference titles (1): 1926

Team data
- Name: Edinburg Bobcats (1926–1927)
- Ballpark: League Park, located at Edinburg High School and Junior College (1926–1927)

The Edinburg Bobcats were a minor league baseball franchise based in Edinburg, Texas. In 1926 and 1927, the Bobcats played as members of two Class D level leagues. Edinburg played a partial season in the Gulf Coast League in 1926, winning the league championship and in the 1927 Texas Valley League. The Edinburg Bobcats hosted home minor league home games exclusively at League Park, which was located on the campus of Edinburg High School and Junior College.

== History ==
The "Edinburg Bobcats" were formed during the 1926 season and won the league championship. On August 24, 1926, the Victoria Rosebuds of the Class D level Gulf Coast League, moved to Edinburg. Victoria had a 46–37 record at the time of the move and had won the first–half championship. The existing Victoria players reportedly did not make the move to Edinburg. The Victoria/Edinburg team ended the regular season with a record of 51–48 overall, placing second in the four–team league. Playing the season under managers Bart Cahill and Cam Hill, Edinburg finished 3.5 games behind the first place Laredo Oilers in the final regular season standings. Laredo won the second–half championship. In the playoffs the Victoria Rosebuds/Edinburg Bobcats defeated the Beeville Bees/Laredo Oilers team 4 games to 3, to win the championship.

The Edinburg Bobcats continued play in a newly named league in 1927. The Texas Valley League formed as a four–team Class D level league, evolving from the 1926 Gulf Coast League, with the Corpus Christi Seahawks, Edinburg Bobcats, Laredo Oilers and Mission Grapefruiters teams continuing play. All four teams had finished the previous season as the only members of the 1926 Gulf Coast League. The Texas Valley League began play on April 5, 1927. With a record of 57–58, Edinburg placed third in the overall standings under managers Roy Morton and Cam Hill, finishing 4.0 games behind first place Mission. Edinburg missed the playoffs, as the Corpus Christi Seahawks won the first–half standings and Laredo won the second–half standings to play in the Finals (where Corpus Christi defeated Laredo).

Edinburg did not return to play in 1928. The Texas Valley League continued play as a four–team league, as the Mission Grapefruiters and Corpus Christi Seahawks were joined by new teams from Brownsville, Texas and McAllen, Texas. The Texas Valley League folded after the 1928 season.

Edinburg, Texas was without minor league baseball until the 2001 Edinburg Roadrunners began play as members of the Independent level Texas-Louisiana League.

== The ballpark ==
The Edinburg Bobcats played home games exclusively at League Park, which was located on the campus of the Edinburg Senior High School and Edinburg Junior College in downtown Edinburg. The exact location of the school at the time was the northwest corner of North 8th Avenue and West McIntyre Street, where a portion of Edinburg's city hall and the municipal auditorium now stand. Edinburg Junior College, which was created by the Edinburg School District and eventually evolved into the University of Texas - Pan American, occupied a building at that time that was adjacent to the high school and to League Park. It later moved west to a new campus that is now known as the University of Texas Rio Grande Valley. In addition to baseball games, League Park hosted football games for both the high school and the junior college.

The source placing the team at the high school ballpark claims that the field had a short right field porch that led to many home runs. This claim, however, is not supported by the team's batting statistics, which show only 26 home runs in more than 2,600 at bats, translating to less than one home run every three games.

== Timeline ==
Year(s)	# Yrs.	Team	Level	League	Ballpark
1926	1	Edinburg Bobcats	Class D	Gulf Coast League	Edinburg High School Field
1927	1	Edinburg Bobcats	Class D	Texas Valley League	Edinburg High School Field

== Year–by–year records ==
Year	Record	Finish	Manager	Playoffs/Notes
1926	51–48	2nd	Bart Cahill / Cam Hill	Victoria moved to Edinburg August 24; League champions
1927	57–58	3rd	Roy Morton / Cam Hill	Did not qualify for playoff

== Notable alumni ==
Cliff Garrison (1927)
