= William D. Wittliff =

American author and photographer (1940–2019)

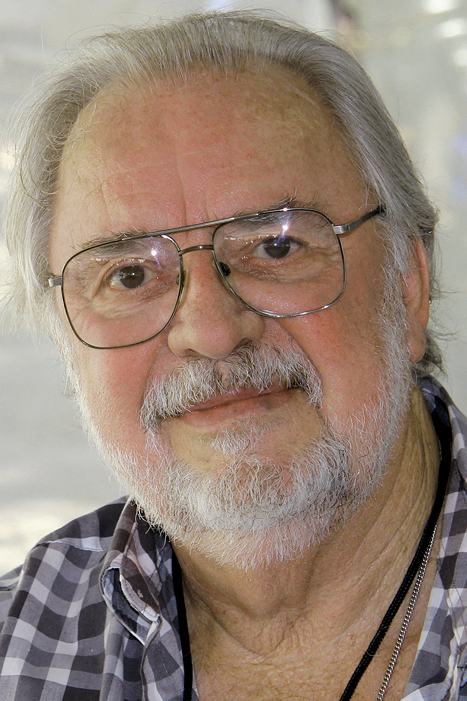
- Wittliff at the 2014 Texas Book Festival
- Born: January 21, 1940; Taft, Texas, U.S.
- Died: June 9, 2019 (aged 79); Austin, Texas, U.S.
- Education: University of Texas at Austin
- Occupations: Screenwriter, photographer
- Years active: 1964 – 2019

William Dale Wittliff (January 21, 1940 – June 9, 2019), sometimes credited as Bill Wittliff, was an American screenwriter, author, and photographer who wrote the screenplays for The Perfect Storm (2000), Barbarosa (1982), Raggedy Man (1981), and many others.

== Early life ==
Wittliff was born in Taft, Texas, on January 21, 1940, and moved to Blanco as a boy with his mother Laura (née Sachtleben) and his brother "Jim" Wittliff now a noted American Biochemist. Bill studied journalism at the University of Texas at Austin and worked for a publishing house in Austin and was business and production manager for the Southern Methodist University Press in Dallas.

In 1964, he started his own publishing house, Encino Press. The last book from the Encino Press was Blue & Some Other Dogs by John Graves, issued in 1981.

== Career ==
Wittliff wrote Country (1984), and the film would have been his directorial debut, but he quit after his cinematographer was fired.

Wittliff met Willie Nelson in the late 1970s, and he was a writer on Honeysuckle Rose (1980) and Barbarosa (1982), both of which starred Nelson. Wittliff agreed to write a script based on Nelson's album Red Headed Stranger (1975). Wittliff finished a draft in 1979 and Universal Studios green-lighted the film with a budget of $14 million. The studio wanted Robert Redford to play the Red Headed Stranger, a role Nelson had envisioned for himself. Redford turned the part down and Nelson and Wittliff returned their advances to buy the script back. Wittliff went on to direct and co-produce (along with Nelson) the film Red Headed Stranger (1986).

Wittliff wrote screenplays for the Lonesome Dove miniseries (1989) for which he won a Writers Guild of America Award in 1990 for season one, episode one: "Leaving" and a Bronze Wrangler award from the National Cowboy & Western Heritage Museum. In 1995, he won another Bronze Wrangler for Legends of the Fall (1994). Wittliff also received Austin Film Festival's Distinguished Screenwriter Award in 1996.

In 1986, Wittliff founded the Southwest Writers Collection at Texas State University, which featured work by authors and songwriters from Texas and the American Southwest. In 1996, he founded the Wittliff Collection of Southwestern and Mexican Photography at the university. The university's holdings, now renamed the Wittliff Collections, have grown to become one of the most extensive archives of Southwestern materials in the United States, two key collections being the papers of writers Cormac McCarthy and Sandra Cisneros. The archive also features an exhibition containing items from Lonesome Dove.

Wittliff penned a trilogy of Western novels published by the University of Texas Press: The Devil's Backbone in 2014, The Devil's Sinkhole in 2016 and The Devil's Fork in 2018. All were illustrated by Jack Unruh.

Wittliff was also a distinguished photographer. His photographs are included in the books Vaquero: Genesis of the Texas Cowboy (2004), La Vida Brinca (2006), and A Book of Photographs from Lonesome Dove (2007). A collection by Wittliff of discards and leftovers by souvenir photographers working in the red-light district of Boy's Town, Nuevo Laredo was published as Boystown: La Zona de Tolerancia (2000). One of the photographs of an unusual-looking man sitting at a bar inspired the hairstyle and clothing of the Anton Chigurh character in the film No Country for Old Men.

== Personal life ==
In 1996, Wittliff was recipient of the Austin Film Festival's Distinguished Screenwriter Award. In 2001, Wittliff was inducted into the Texas Film Hall of Fame. In 1959, he was initiated as a member of the Tau chapter of Kappa Sigma at the University of Texas and in 2012 became the fraternity's 79th recipient of the Man of the Year distinction. In 2014, Wittliff and his wife Sally Wittliff, an attorney in Austin, Texas, were awarded honorary doctor of letters degrees by Texas State University.

Wittliff died on June 9, 2019, in Austin from a heart attack at the age of 79.
