= Texas Music Educators Association =

Educational organization in Texas

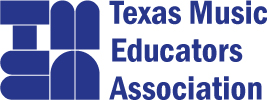

- Abbreviation: TMEA
- Formation: 1920
- Type: Volunteer; NPO
- Legal status: Association
- Purpose: Educational and Fine Arts
- Headquarters: 7900 Centre Park Dr. Austin, TX 78754
- Region served: Texas Jurisdiction
- President: Jesse Cannon II
- Affiliations: University Interscholastic League Association of Texas Small School Bands
- Website: tmea.org
- Remarks: (888) 318-8632

The Texas Music Educators Association (TMEA) is an organization of over 12,000 Texas school music educators. Its stated goals are to provide professional growth opportunities, to encourage interaction among music education professionals, to foster public support for music in schools, to offer quality musical experiences for students, to cultivate universal appreciation and lifetime involvement in music, and to develop and maintain productive working relationships with other professional organizations.

== History ==
TMEA was founded in 1920 by James E. King(1885-1947) and originally called the Texas Band Teachers Association.

Once an affiliate of MENC: The National Association for Music Education, TMEA was expelled as the state affiliate largely due to policy disputes over compulsory MENC membership in 1975. Essentially, at the time of federated status, TMEA members had the option to join TMEA without paying dues to MENC. MENC found this arrangement untenable and urged TMEA to revise its constitution to require all TMEA members to pay full MENC dues and affiliate with MENC. This question was repeatedly put before TMEA membership who rejected it in ballot after ballot. MENC officially expelled TMEA, what would have been and would remain today its largest affiliated organization, on June 30, 1975. TMEA assisted MENC in the creation of the "Texas Music Educators Conference," to be a Texas MENC affiliate. Prior to the expulsion, over 1000 TMEA members voluntarily maintained MENC membership, however in its first report to MENC, the newly formed TMEC claimed only 99 members statewide.

Issues regarding the dominance of TMEA by the state's larger schools (those in UIL Classes AAAA and AAAAA) led to the 1991 formation of the Association of Texas Small School Bands (ATSSB), membership in which is limited to schools in UIL Classes A, AA, and AAA. However, TMEA and ATSSB (along with other organizations, such as the Texas Bandmasters Association, which also split from TMEA in the 1940s) work together to promote music education in Texas.

== Functions ==
=== All-State ===
TMEA is responsible for auditions into and concerts of Texas's All-Region and All-State bands, orchestras and choirs. It aligns schools into the 33 regions which are used by the University Interscholastic League (UIL) and the Association of Texas Small School Bands (ATSSB) for their competitions. The audition music is announced at the yearly Texas Bandmasters Association (TBA) convention in San Antonio, usually in July. TMEA has partnered with the company, Ensemble Block, to provide free All-State Etude video lessons created by the official Etude selectors for TMEA All-Region/All-State candidates starting in 2025-2026.

Auditions are held at the region level during the fall of each year to determine All-City, All-District and All-Region groups. Most regions host a public concert of their All-Region bands, orchestras and choirs to provide a performance clinic for the selected musicians and to showcase the students' musicianship.

Top ranked musicians from each region advance to their respective All-Area auditions. The All-Area groups serve to reduce the number of participants considered for All-State and therefore do not have a performance component as do the All-Region groups.

A final audition is held among the top All-Area musicians to decide membership in the All-State groups. Student musicians selected for an All-State group are invited to attend the annual TMEA convention and participate in a performance clinic and concert.

Music that various All-State groups have performed include:

- Don Juan
- Concerto for Orchestra
- Children Go Where I Send Thee
- Pines of Rome
- Dances of Galanta
- Lacrimosa and Amen
- Shostakovich Symphony No. 5
- The Sorcerer's Apprentice
- And other challenging/technical pieces

The All-State groups include the following:

==== List of Texas All-State Groups ====
- 6A Symphonic Band
- 6A Concert Band
- 5A Symphonic Band
- Jazz Ensemble 1
- Jazz Ensemble 2
- 6A Percussion Ensemble
- 5A Percussion Ensemble
- Symphony Orchestra
- Philharmonic Orchestra
- Sinfonietta Orchestra (replaced the String Orchestra in 2018-19)
- Mariachi Ensemble
- Large School Mixed Choir
- Small School Mixed Choir
- Treble Choir
- Tenor-Bass Choir
- TTCCDA Choir
- TCCBDA Symphonic Band
- TCCBDA Jazz Ensemble
- ATSSB Symphonic Band
- ATSSB Concert Band
- ATSSB Jazz Ensemble

=== Honor Ensembles ===
Every year, orchestras and bands across Texas have the opportunity to submit recordings of orchestral pieces to TMEA in the hopes of receiving the honor of being the TMEA Honor Orchestra or Band for that year. The winning orchestra or band will get to perform at the annual TMEA Convention in February. If an orchestra or band has won the title for the current year, they are forbidden from competing in the same category for the following year.

=== Clinic/Convention ===
TMEA hosts an annual convention in San Antonio during the month of February. The convention's main attractions are workshops that qualify as continuing education credit for music teachers, an exhibition show for the music industry and concerts by many honor and invited groups. Concerts performed by the All-State groups provide a finale for the convention.

=== Southwestern Musician ===
Southwestern Musician is an official publication of TMEA. Content includes various articles on music education and information about TMEA events and operations. Eight issues are published during the school year.
