= Kermit Oliver =

American painter

- Born: 1943 (age 82–83); Refugio, TX
- Education: Texas Southern University

Kermit Oliver (born 1943) is an American painter who studied and worked in Houston before moving to Waco, Texas. His work reflects his Texas heritage and his interests in mythology, religion, and history. Oliver combines "contemporary and classical elements, resulting in a style he calls symbolic realism." His paintings create "strange, lushly illustrated worlds populated by people and animals realistically drawn but placed in surreal juxtaposition."

Oliver was named the 2017 Texas State Two-Dimensional Artist by the Texas Commission on the Arts. His painting Tobias was included in the 2016 inaugural exhibition at the Smithsonian’s National Museum of African American History and Culture in Washington, D.C. In 2013, Oliver was honored with the first Lifetime Achievement Award from the Art League Houston.

== Background, education, personal life ==
Oliver was born in Refugio, Texas, where his father worked as a cowboy on a cattle ranch. By the age of 6 or 7, his talent for drawing the cattle, horses, and the south Texas flora and fauna was evident. After graduating from high school, in 1960 Oliver enrolled at Texas Southern University in Houston, where he was a student of the artist, Dr. John T. Biggers. He married fellow art student, Katie Washington, in 1962. While at Texas Southern University, he was the recipient of a Jesse H. Jones art scholarship, and graduated in 1967 with Bachelor of Fine Arts and art education degrees. In 1968 Oliver began teaching art at Texas Southern University, and also taught at the Art League of Houston, but soon decided not to pursue teaching as a career.

For most of his life, Oliver worked as both an artist and a full-time mail sorter for the US Postal Service, initially in Houston and then for thirty years after moving to Waco in 1984. He believed that a steady income was the best way to support his family while allowing him the freedom to pursue art on his own terms.

In 1998, his youngest son, Khristian, was tried for a murder committed during a botched burglary. To fund his son's defense, Hermès commissioned fifteen color variations of a scarf design for half a million dollars—the largest single order in the house's history—allowing Oliver to retain legal counsel Mike DeGeurin. Khristian was convicted, and executed by lethal injection in 2009.

In 2013, Oliver retired from the postal service and continued working as an artist.

== Art ==
While still an art student, Oliver’s work was included in a show at Houston’s Courtney Gallery, and in 1970 the gallery gave him his first solo exhibition. He had his second solo show at the DuBose Gallery the following year. In the years after his graduation from Texas Southern University, Oliver became an integral part of the Houston art scene. He was the first African-American artist in Houston to be represented by a major commercial gallery. His work was subsequently exhibited in numerous solo and group shows and has been included in a number of museum collections. In 2005, the Museum of Fine Arts, Houston held a retrospective exhibition of Oliver’s work, Notes from a Child’s Odyssey: The Art of Kermit Oliver, that included more than 90 works created over four decades.

Alvia Wardlaw, curator of Oliver's 2005 retrospective exhibition, noted that "The love of flora and fauna that you see in Kermit’s art began in that childhood where he was free to roam around Refugio and ride horses and hunt and sketch and draw…His visual sensibility with regards to the Texas landscape which he makes a metaphor for the wonders of the universe was born out of those youthful experiences." Oliver has noted that his work deals with ideas such as growth, metamorphosis, birth, death, rebirth, resurrection, immortality and "redemption...that especially." His paintings create worlds where "...animals, plants, and humans interact in surprising scenes that seem freighted with a mysterious and complex significance." A painting of a figure standing in front of rows of tall shrubbery is not simply a study of a garden, but Theseus and the Labyrinth.

Oliver is also known for his celebrated work as a designer of scarves for Hermès, the French fashion house. The relationship began in 1980 when Hermès asked Lawrence Marcus of the upscale department store Neiman Marcus whether he knew of an American artist who could create a design for a scarf with a Southwestern theme. Marcus told Hermès about Oliver, and the design was a success—so much so that Oliver created 17 designs for Hermès over 32 years. He is the only American artist to create designs for Hermès. In 2025, The Bryan Museum in Galveston, Texas staged “Kermit Oliver & Hermès: Storytelling on Silk & Canvas," an exhibit curated by Meg Tucker, which showcased all 17 of his designs alongside other art and ephemera to create context for his scarves.

Oliver's work is held in the collection of the Houston Museum of Fine Arts.
