= University Interscholastic League =

Regulatory organization in Texas, US

- Abbreviation: UIL
- Formation: 1910
- Type: Volunteer; Non-profit organization
- Legal status: Association
- Headquarters: Austin, Texas
- Region served: Texas Jurisdiction
- Executive director: Charles Breithaupt
- Affiliations: National Federation of State High School Associations Texas Music Educators Association Association of Texas Small School Bands Texas Education Agency
- Website: uiltexas.org

The University Interscholastic League (UIL) is an organization that creates rules for and administers almost all athletic, musical, and academic contests for public primary and secondary schools in the U.S. state of Texas. It is the largest organization of its type in the world.

Activities range from American football and cross-examination debate to mathematics and marching band competitions; however, the UIL does not administer Academic Decathlon competitions.

The UIL is under the governance of the Vice President for Diversity and Community Engagement at the University of Texas at Austin in Austin, Texas. Although the Texas Education Agency governs the activities of schools and school districts in Texas, the UIL does not report to TEA, but is instead a separate entity.

== History ==
The UIL was originally created by the University of Texas at Austin in 1910 as two different entities, the Debating League of Texas High Schools (to govern debating contests) and the Interscholastic Athletic Association (to govern athletic contests). The two entities merged in 1913 and adopted the UIL name.

At the time, UIL governed only white schools in Texas. From 1940 to 1970, an era of racial segregation in Texas, the Prairie View Interscholastic League (PVIL), headquartered at Prairie View A&M University, served as a separate parallel organization for African-American public high schools in Texas.

In 1965, the UIL agreed to admit PVIL member schools for competition. Black schools began UIL competitions beginning in the 1967–68 school year. After the 1969–70 school year, the UIL fully absorbed all PVIL member schools, the majority of which would later be merged with their white counterparts.

Beginning with the 2003–2004 academic year, two large all-male private schools, Dallas Jesuit and Houston Strake Jesuit, were granted UIL membership. This came after extensive court battles and negotiations from both the UIL's lawyers and the schools' joint lawyers. Previously, both schools were members of the now-defunct Texas Christian Interscholastic League (TCIL); after that league's demise and their inability to gain admittance into the Texas Association of Private and Parochial Schools (TAPPS) or Southwest Preparatory Conference (SPC), they decided to further pursue their decade-long battle of gaining membership into the UIL. They are so far the only private schools to be granted UIL membership, as the new UIL rules established after the Jesuit schools' entry prohibited those schools who were eligible for memberships in other similar associations (such as TAPPS or the SPC) to apply.

On October 10, 2010, the Third District Court of Appeals in Austin ruled that the UIL operates as a public organization and not a private organization. The ruling clarified that the UIL is legally considered a state agency and must comply with the prerequisites and duties that all other state agencies have. As a state agent, the UIL must treat individuals equally and show the purpose/need as well as a rational basis for eligibility restrictions.

The Texas Legislature rewrote titles 1 and 2 of the Texas Education Code and greatly restricted the functions to be performed by the Texas Education Agency and the UIL. The changes made Texas an equal access state. The law now requires the public schools to allow all students that reside within the school's boundary equal access to all activities. The Senate also made amendments that expressly regulate the UIL and invalidated certain UIL rules limiting student eligibility for competitions by providing that UIL rules would only apply to a student enrolled in the public school. The UIL no longer has the authority to determine the eligibility of charter/home/private school students.

All students must abide by the state No Pass No Play law. Only students that are enrolled in a public school must abide by UIL eligibility rules, even if the activity is not a UIL event.

== Organization ==
Activities for most Texas private schools are governed by separate bodies, the largest of which is TAPPS. However, private schools are allowed to join the UIL only if 1) they meet UIL's definition of a high school, 2) they are accredited by the Texas Private School Accreditation Commission, and 3) they are ineligible for membership in any league similar to UIL (such as TAPPS or the Southwest Preparatory Conference). Furthermore, private schools must compete at one classification higher than their enrollment would otherwise dictate. UIL schools are permitted to schedule contests with private schools and/or home school groups.

Charter schools must participate at no lower than the classification of the smallest high school in the district where the charter school resides; for example, a charter school within Dallas ISD must participate in at least Class AAAA, as DISD has high schools which participate at this level.

Schools are arranged by conference to ensure that schools compete on a regular basis with other schools in the geographic area of a similar size. The conferences are A (the smallest), AA, AAA, AAAA, AAAAA and AAAAAA (the largest). The corresponding alphanumeric designations (1A, 2A, 3A, 4A, 5A, and 6A) are used in everyday conversation (as well as in this article), but officially UIL only uses the alphabetic designations. The general guideline is that the UIL desires between 220 and 245 schools in Conference AAAAAA, at least 200 schools in Conferences AA, AAA, AAAA, and AAAAA with the grades 9–12 enrollment ratio for those classes no greater than 2.0 between the largest and smallest school in each class.

In addition, for football participation, a school whose enrollment is at or below 104.5 students may choose to play either six-man football (which, as of the 2014 alignment, is Conference 1A) or 11-man football (at Conference 2A). Schools with enrollments over 104.5 are only eligible for 11-man football; however, some schools organize a six-man team and play an "outlaw" schedule (i.e., the school is not eligible for the postseason). Moreover, for some events (such as team tennis, swimming, or diving), the UIL organizes all participating schools into Conference 6A and Conference 5A, with the latter encompassing all schools not meeting the Conference 6A enrollment requirements.

Within each conference, the UIL separates the schools into regions, and then further separates the regions into districts for various contests. The districts are numbered from 1 (in far west Texas) to 32 (in south Texas). There are always 32 districts in Conference 6A and Conference 5A, but the smaller conferences may have numbers skipped based on the number of schools in the conference. No more than 10 schools are permitted in a single district unless all schools and the UIL consent otherwise; the preference is for an even number of schools in each district (6, 8, 10), though in some cases travel issues may prevent such.

Previously, schools were permitted to request to be placed in a higher conference than their enrollment would otherwise dictate, usually to play at a higher level of competition. The "play up" rule was later eliminated for competition reasons, but has been retained for geographic reasons (where playing at the current level would create a travel hardship for the school), and where school districts with eight or more high schools could keep all or most of them in the same conference. However, the school must then participate at the higher conference in all UIL events in which it does participate.

Each type of contest has different regions and competitors, as there is no requirement that a school participate in all UIL events – some small rural schools do not participate in football or choose six-man over 11-man, while some magnet schools do not field athletic teams but participate in academic events only.

Unlike the college ranks or other states, the regions and districts are not permanently set, but are redrawn biennially by the UIL behind closed doors in an attempt to keep schools of similar sizes within a certain distance of their geographic area when attending competitions, and to adjust for the changing enrollments of schools (moving schools with increased attendance up in conference and those with decreased attendance down) and new schools opening. The main redrawing of regions and districts takes place on February 1 of even-numbered years (and the final allocation, especially relating to high school football, is the subject of much pre-announcement anticipation and speculation as to which schools move up or down and the final composition of the districts), but as new schools open or smaller schools close or disband programs, interim adjustments can be made.

The changing districts and regions have produced unusual results – for example, the 2008-09 Conference 5A boys' basketball championship featured champion DeSoto from Region II defeating Cedar Hill from Region I, notwithstanding that the schools were in neighboring districts.

== Playoff formats ==
=== Football ===
In Conference 6A, the top four teams from each district are eligible for the playoffs. The two eligible teams with the highest student enrollment for its district are seeded in the Division I playoff bracket, and the remaining two teams (with the lower enrollment) are seeded in the Division II playoff bracket. This method is supposed to prevent matchups between large and small schools within a classification, although in practice this is not always the case – for example, in the 2006 playoffs, Southlake Carroll (the Conference 5A Division I champion; at that time 5A was the largest conference) had a lower student enrollment than Cedar Hill (the Conference 5A Division II champion).

For all other 11-man conferences and for six-man football, the UIL divides schools into separate Division I (large) and Division II (small) districts at its biennial redistricting session (in these cases, there are a maximum of 16 districts statewide, as opposed to the 32 in the larger conferences); separate playoffs are held for each division with the top four teams (top two in six-man) from each district eligible.

=== Other major team sports ===
In 2A-6A volleyball, the top four teams in each district qualify for the playoffs. For 1A, the top three teams qualify for the playoffs, with the first-place team receiving a first-round bye.

In 1A-6A basketball, the top four teams in each district qualify for the playoffs.

In 4A-6A soccer, the top four teams in each district qualify for the playoffs.

In 2A-6A baseball and softball, the top four teams in each district qualify for the playoffs. In 1A baseball and softball, the top two teams qualify for the playoffs.

For baseball and softball, at all levels except the state tournament, playoff rounds are best 2-of-3 only if both coaches agree; if they do not then the coaches flip a coin to decide the format of the playoff (single game or two out of three series). At the state tournament both the semifinals and finals are single-game format.

Beginning with the 2024-2025 school year, the 6A football playoff format was implemented for 1A-6A basketball, 2A-6A volleyball, baseball and softball, and 4A-6A soccer, with the two largest schools by enrollment playing in a Division I bracket, and the two smallest schools playing in a Division II bracket.

=== Academics and other sports ===
Advancement varies significantly by event. In most Academic events, the top three District medalists plus the first place District team advance to Region. Likewise, the top three Region medalists plus the first place Region team advance to State competition. Furthermore, the highest-scoring second place team in each Region at District competition advances to Region as a Wild Card, and the highest scoring second place Region team advances to State as a Wild Card. In Computer Applications, all Journalism events, all Speech & Debate events, and Ready Writing, no team component, and therefore no wild cards, exist. Exceptions include the following:

- In Congressional Debate, ESC Regions are utilized instead of districts and competition occurs in the fall rather than spring. The top three medalists from each Region advance to state. For every ten competitors beyond thirty at a regional meet, an additional spot to advance to state is granted to that region.
- In Cross-Examination Debate, the top two teams advance directly from district to state
- In Science, additional spots to qualify to region and to state are given to the highest individual scorer in each of Biology, Chemistry, and Physics subsections.
- In a variety of other contests, such as the Film Festival, Robotics, Essay Competitions, and Theatrical Design, submissions are sent directly to the state level.

=== High School One-Act Play (OAP) Contest ===
The UIL High School One-Act Play contest is a competition where similarly sized Texas high schools present an 18-40 minute play and may be adjudicated by a panel of three judges or a single judge. The contest is held on a single day and open to the public. There are six possible levels of competition: Zone, District, Bi-District, Area, Region, and State with the Zone level serving as an optional preliminary stage for larger districts. At each level of competition a judge awards individual acting awards as well as selecting three productions to advance to the next level of competition up to the Regional Level where only two will advance to the State Level. After the awards are announced a Judge gives an oral critique to each of the schools. Because of the wide participation and diversity of plays produced certain rules and guidelines have been adopted by the State One-Act Play Office. These rules are in place to ensure safety, allow for equity, satisfy legal standards, and make the running of the contest practical.

=== Musical competition ===
In musical competitions, schools are aligned into 33 regions (the regions themselves are set not by the UIL, but by the Texas Music Educators Association). Schools of all sizes are grouped into a region.

in general, advancement within musical competition is not based on direct competition against other schools. Instead, musicians are compared against an established rubric (this is comparable to conformation dog shows where dogs compete against the written standard for their breed, not against other dogs of differing breeds), and are given a rating of Division I (Superior), Division II (Excellent), Division III (Average), Division IV (Below Average), or Division V (Poor). All individuals or ensembles who are given an overall Division I (based on the consensus of each judge's rating) may advance to the next level, except for area and state marching band competition (which use an alternative system).

==== Marching band ====
For marching band, schools compete against other schools in the same UIL conference. The 33 regions are grouped into nine areas (named A-I) for Conferences 5A and 6A, and five areas (A-E) for Conference 4A and down. All schools of all conferences compete in region, area, and state competition annually as a fall semester activity. There are no area contests for Conference 1A or military class bands, only for 2A and up.

Prior to the region competition, marching bands choose to enter one of two classes: open class or military class. Since bands do not compete against each other directly at the region contest, military class and open class bands perform at the same region contest. After the region contest, open class and military class bands compete separately.

In order for bands to advance from region to area (or state for Conference 1A or military bands), they must receive an overall Division I rating.

The format of the area contest is dependent on the number of bands receiving the required ratings at the region contest. If less than 9 bands advance to area, one round of competition is held, with either the top 2 bands (in 5A and 6A) or the top 3 bands (in 4A and lower) advancing to state. If more than 9 bands are to participate at area, a preliminary and final round are conducted, with the number of bands advancing to finals determined by contest size. The number of bands that advance to state from finals is likewise determined by contest size.

State competition uses a similar format to area, with a preliminary and final round always being held.

Area and state contests use an ordinal system, in which each judge assigns each band an ordinal. These ordinals are then added together, with the lowest total determining the champion. For example, School 1 receives a first place ranking from three judges, a second place ranking from the fourth judge, and a fourth place ranking from the fifth judge. The ordinal total for School 1 is 9 (1+1+1+2+4). School 2 receives two first place rankings and three second place rankings. The ordinal total for School 2 is 8 (2+2+2+1+1). Therefore, School 2 would be the champion despite receiving fewer first place rankings because School 2's ordinal score is lower than School 1's.

==== Concert and sight-reading ====
Concert and sight-reading is divided into 3 divisions: band, orchestra, and vocal, and is held in the spring semester. Concert ensembles prepare a program from the UIL's Prescribed Music List and perform for a panel of 3 judges, who each rate the ensemble on the Division I-Division V scale. Immediately after performing their concert program, ensembles move to a separate sight-reading room, where they sight-read a piece that is specially prepared for that school year and used statewide. Sight-reading is also adjudicated with the Division I-Division V system.

In sight-reading, schools in different conferences read different pieces, and second or third groups (officially called "non-varsity" groups) read different pieces from other conferences than the varsity group. Sight-reading is held at the region level only. Wind ensembles can advance from region to state; however, the state event is not a competition but an educational event.

==== Solo and small ensemble ====
In solo and small ensemble competition, held in the spring semester, conference alignments are disregarded. Advancement in solo and small ensemble competition is from region to state, and at state the top two soloists and top ensemble are awarded medals. Individual performers may be given Outstanding Performer awards. However, advancement is limited not only to Division 1 winners, but the winners must have performed "Class 1" (difficult level) performances at region, and the performance must have been from a selection on the UIL's Prescribed Music List and also performed from memory (except for certain instrumental pieces which are designated as exempt from such on the List).

==== Music theory ====
Music theory is held at state only and is open to any and all students in grades 9–12 having the permission of the school principal and school music director; the student is not required to have advanced from region in another musical contest (or even participated, for that matter).

== Events ==
=== Athletics ===
Historically, football championship games have been held at neutral sites mutually agreed upon by both teams, but in 2006, 2007 and 2009, both Conference 5A championship games were played at the Alamodome in San Antonio. Frequent sites for those games included the Astrodome in Houston, Texas Stadium in Irving, Alamo Stadium in San Antonio and Darrell K Royal–Texas Memorial Stadium in Austin.

In 2010, the UIL designated sites for all championship games: the 5A, 4A, and 3A championships were held at AT&T Stadium in Arlington, while the 2A and 1A championships were held at Newsom Stadium in Mansfield and the six-man championships at Shotwell Stadium in Abilene. In 2011, Conferences 1A-5A played their state championships at AT&T Stadium, while the six-man games were played at Abilene. In 2013, the six-man games moved to AT&T Stadium as well. In 2015 the 11-man championships were played at NRG Stadium in Houston due to a conflict with a Dallas Cowboys-New York Jets game, while the six-man title games returned to Shotwell. All championship games returned to AT&T Stadium in 2016.

The state semifinal and championship games for all five classes in boys and girls basketball were previously held at the Frank Erwin Center on the campus of The University of Texas at Austin. In 2015 it was decided to move the boys & girls state tournaments to the Alamodome in San Antonio, TX, due to ongoing price and venue disputes in Austin. The state track and field meet and swimming championships are also held on the UT Austin campus, the former at Mike A. Myers Stadium and the latter at the Lee and Joe Jamail Texas Swimming Center.

The state soccer championship games for 4A, 5A, and 6A are held at Birkelbach Field in the Austin suburb of Georgetown, and the state baseball tournament is held at Dell Diamond in another Austin suburb, Round Rock. The state softball finals is held at Red and Charline McCombs Field on the UT Austin campus. The state cross-country meet is held at Old Settlers Park in Round Rock. The state wrestling tournament is held at the Berry Center in Houston. The Conference 5A state golf tournament is held at Jimmy Clay Golf Course, a municipal course in Austin.

From 2000–2011 the girls' volleyball tournament was held in Strahan Coliseum on the campus of Texas State University in San Marcos. Since 2012, the tournament has been held at the Curtis Culwell Center in Garland.

==== Current State Championship sites ====
- Baseball: Dell Diamond, Round Rock
- Basketball: Alamodome, San Antonio
- Cross Country: Old Settler's Park, Round Rock
- Football: AT&T Stadium, Arlington
- Soccer: Birkelbach Field, Georgetown
- Softball: Red and Charline McCombs Field, Austin
- Swimming and Diving: Josh Davis Natatorium, San Antonio (4A); Lee and Joe Jamail Texas Swimming Center, Austin (5A and 6A)
- Team Tennis: Waco Regional Tennis Center and Baylor University, Waco
- Tennis: Blossom Tennis Center, Annemarie Tennis Center, and Northside Tennis Center, San Antonio (North East ISD and Northside ISD)
- Track and Field: Mike A. Myers Stadium, Austin
- Volleyball: Curtis Culwell Center, Garland
- Water Polo: Josh Davis Natatorium, San Antonio
- Wrestling: Berry Center, Cypress

=== Academics and spring meet ===
Though UIL is best known as the governing body for public school athletic competition, it also hosts numerous academic competitions as well, such as Math, Science, Ready Writing, Social Studies, and many others. Between athletics, music, theatre, spirit (cheer) and academics, UIL estimates that half of all public high school graduates have competed in at least one UIL-sanctioned event during their high school tenure.

The state level academic and speech competitions are held on the campus of The University of Texas at Austin, with the exception of Spirit/Cheer State Championship (Arlington, Texas), One-Act Play + Theatrical Design State Championships (Round Rock ISD Performing Arts Center) and UIL Young Filmmakers State Contest (Majestic Theatre - San Antonio, TX). The Student Congress state contest is typically held in the State Capitol Building.

For fine arts and journalism contests, the UIL has not adopted an "amateur rule." Thus, students who have acted or performed professionally or who have written for a local newspaper may still compete in UIL-sanctioned contests provided they are otherwise eligible.

=== Speech and debate ===
In addition to academic and athletic competitions, UIL also organizes various public speaking and debate events such as cross-examination debate, congressional debate, prose, poetry, extemporaneous speaking, and Lincoln-Douglas debate. Speech & Debate is the league's longest running contest, first being introduced in 1910.

== Participation ==
In the 2024–25 season, the University Interscholastic League featured 879,403 participants, with 59% boys and 41% girls.

The sports with most boys are:

- American football: 174,126
- Track and field (athletics): 74,770
- Basketball: 62,977
- Baseball: 53,923
- Soccer: 49,032
- Cross country athletics: 27,892

The sports with most girls are:

- Competitive spirit squads: 52,318
- Basketball: 44,953
- Track and field (athletics): 56,698
- Volleyball: 53,013
- Soccer: 40,252
- Softball: 36,875
- Cross country athletics: 25,393

== Scholarship fund ==
Any student who competes at a state academic meet (at any high school grade) is also eligible to apply for a scholarship from the Texas Interscholastic League Foundation, an affiliate of UIL. The student must attend college in Texas full-time and meet certain grade requirements.
