= Edmund Barry Gaither =

American curator (born 1944)

Edmund Barry Gaither (b. 1944) is an American curator, who is known for his education and museum-related activities.

He was born in 1944 in Great Falls, a small town in South Carolina, United States. His interest and passion for art began at an early age, but because he grew up in a small town, he had no way to visit museums. After high school, Edmund Gaither attended Morehouse College in Georgia, only male historically black college in the United States. College was an extremely important time for Gaither, because it allowed him access to the artwork he had such a passion for, a population where he fit in, and an atmosphere to find himself.

Gaither graduated Morehouse with a Bachelor of Arts and went on to further his education at Brown University. He graduated from Brown with a Masters in Fine Arts in 1968. In 1969, Gaither became a curator at the Museum of Fine Arts in Boston. He went on to found the National Center of Afro-American Artists, located in Roxbury, Massachusetts. The Center has become a vitally important showcase of African-American artists and culture for Boston and the United States.

A love for education led Gaither to develop a course on African-American art at which he served as a lecturer at various colleges across the nation. Some of these institutions included Spelman College (1968-1969), Massachusetts College of Art (1970-1971), Harvard College (1972-1975), and Wellesley College (1971-1974). Gaither also taught a course in African American studies at Boston University.

He is a respected individual in the museum field and has served many positions, some including Commission on Museums for a New Century, Commission on Equity and Excellence, and Museums and Communities, American Alliance of Museums. Outside the museum world, he served on President George W. Bush’s Advisory Board on Historically Black Colleges and Universities. Gaither was the first president of the African American Museums Association.
