= Les Mallon =

American baseball player (1905-1991)

- Second baseman
- Born: November 21, 1905; Sweetwater, Texas, U.S.
- Died: April 17, 1991 (aged 85); Granbury, Texas, U.S.
- Batted: Right Threw: Right

MLB debut
- April 14, 1931, for the Philadelphia Phillies

Last MLB appearance
- September 29, 1935, for the Boston Braves

MLB statistics
- Batting average: .283
- Home runs: 8
- Runs batted in: 119
- Stats at Baseball Reference

Teams
- Philadelphia Phillies (1931–1932); Boston Braves (1934–1935)

Leslie Clyde Mallon (November 21, 1905 – April 17, 1991) was an American Major League Baseball second baseman for the Philadelphia Phillies and Boston Braves.

Mallon began his professional baseball career in 1927 in the Texas Valley League. In 1930, he hit .332 in the class A Texas League and was promoted to the major leagues with the Phillies. Mallon hit .309 in his rookie season. However, his numbers slipped the following year, and he was sold to Toronto of the International League. He was hitting .345 midway through the 1934 season when he was purchased by the Boston Braves.

Mallon was the Braves starting second baseman in 1935, the year they lost 115 games en route to the second-worst record of any MLB team in the modern era. After the season, he was sold to the Chicago White Sox, and in 1936 he was back in the Texas League with the Dallas Steers. That season, he hit .344 and won the league MVP award. His career ended in 1939.

Mallon was inducted into the Texas Baseball Hall of Fame in 1979.
