= Carlisle Littlejohn =

American baseball player (1901–1977)

- Pitcher
- Born: October 6, 1901; Irene, Texas, U.S.
- Died: October 27, 1977 (aged 76); Kansas City, Missouri, U.S.
- Batted: Right Threw: Right

MLB debut
- May 11, 1927, for the St. Louis Cardinals

Last MLB appearance
- June 23, 1928, for the St. Louis Cardinals

MLB statistics
- Win–loss record: 5-2
- Strikeouts: 22
- Earned run average: 4.14
- Stats at Baseball Reference

Teams
- St. Louis Cardinals (1927–28)

Charles Carlisle Littlejohn (October 6, 1901 – October 27, 1977) was an American professional baseball pitcher. He played parts of two seasons in Major League Baseball, 1927 and 1928, for the St. Louis Cardinals.
