= Taft, Texas =

- City
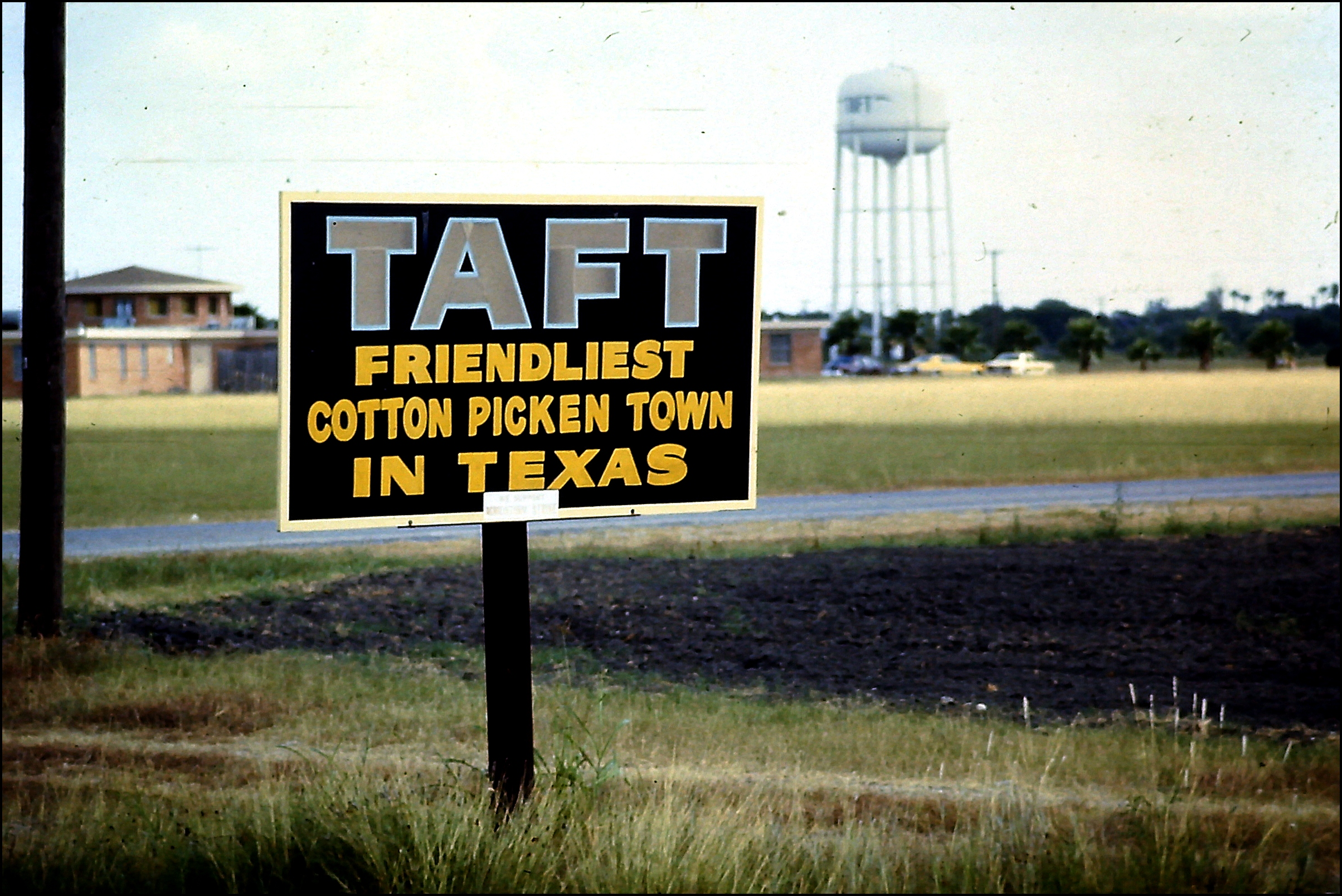
- Sign at the entrance to Taft
- Nickname: "The Friendliest Cotton Pickin' Town in Texas"
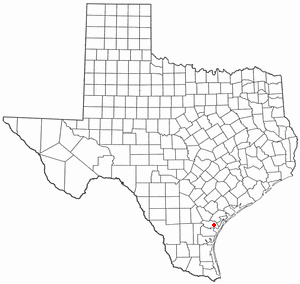
- Location of Taft, Texas

- Coordinates: 27°58′43″N 97°23′40″W
- Country: United States
- State: Texas
- County: San Patricio

Area
  - Total: 1.67 sq mi (4.32 km^{2})
  - Land: 1.67 sq mi (4.32 km^{2})
  - Water: 0 sq mi (0.00 km^{2})
- Elevation: 49 ft (15 m)

Population (2020)
  - Total: 2,801
  - Density: 1,680/sq mi (648/km^{2})
- Time zone: UTC-6 (Central (CST))
  - Summer (DST): UTC-5 (CDT)
- ZIP code: 78390
- Area code: 361
- FIPS code: 48-71684
- GNIS feature ID: 1348200
- Website: www.tafttx.gov

Taft is a city in San Patricio County, Texas, United States. The population was 2,801 at the 2020 census.

== History ==
Taft, often called the "Friendliest Cotton-Pickin' Town in Texas", is not only rich in cotton, but also gas and oil resources. Taft was once the center of the million acre Taft Ranch. The ranch was built and owned by Charles Phelps Taft, the half-brother of President William Howard Taft. The nearby city of Sinton, Texas is named for his father-in-law David Sinton. The Blackland Museum houses everything from antique farm equipment to personal and household items used by the town's earliest inhabitants.

On the evening of 25 August 2017, Hurricane Harvey, a Category 4 Hurricane, made landfall near Rockport, Texas approximately thirty miles north of Taft, at 10 PM CST. Taft was brushed by the outer-bands of the eye wall with winds recorded at 90 mph.

Hurricane Harvey was the first Category 4 Hurricane in over twenty years to hit the city.

== Education ==
The City of Taft is served by the Taft Independent School District.

Schools that serve the city include Woodrow Petty Elementary (Pre-K–5), Taft Junior High School (6–8), and Taft High School (9–12).

Del Mar College is the designated community college for all of San Patricio County.

== Geography ==
Taft is located at 27°58′43″N 97°23′40″W (27.978584, –97.394320).

According to the United States Census Bureau, the city has a total area of 1.5 square miles (3.9 km^{2}), all land.

=== Climate ===
The climate in this area is characterized by hot, humid summers and generally mild to cool winters. According to the Köppen Climate Classification system, Taft has a humid subtropical climate, abbreviated "Cfa" on climate maps.

== Demographics ==
Historical population
Census	Pop.	Note	%±
1930	1,792		—
1940	2,686		49.9%
1950	2,978		10.9%
1960	3,463		16.3%
1970	3,274		−5.5%
1980	3,686		12.6%
1990	3,222		−12.6%
2000	3,396		5.4%
2010	3,048		−10.2%
2020	2,801		−8.1%
U.S. Decennial Census

=== 2020 census ===
As of the 2020 census, Taft had a population of 2,801, a median age of 37.7 years, 25.6% of residents under the age of 18, 16.4% aged 65 years or older, 97.0 males for every 100 females, and 95.4 males for every 100 females age 18 and over.

There were 983 households in Taft; 34.6% had children under the age of 18 living in them, 46.4% were married-couple households, 20.3% had a male householder with no spouse or partner present, 27.3% had a female householder with no spouse or partner present, 23.1% of all households consisted of individuals, 11.4% had someone living alone who was 65 years of age or older, and 824 households were families.

There were 1,191 housing units in the city, of which 17.5% were vacant; the homeowner vacancy rate was 0.5% and the rental vacancy rate was 16.4%.

0.0% of residents lived in urban areas, while 100.0% lived in rural areas.

Racial composition as of the 2020 census
Race	Number	Percent
White	1,316	47.0%
Black or African American	48	1.7%
American Indian and Alaska Native	15	0.5%
Asian	1	0.0%
Native Hawaiian and Other Pacific Islander	0	0.0%
Some other race	337	12.0%
Two or more races	1,084	38.7%
Hispanic or Latino (of any race)	2,161	77.2%

=== 2000 census ===
As of the census of 2000, there were 3,396 people, 1,084 households, and 835 families residing in the city. The population density was 2,266.1 inhabitants per square mile (874.9/km^{2}). There were 1,214 housing units at an average density of 810.1 per square mile (312.8/km^{2}). The racial makeup of the city was 71.02% White, 3.33% African American, 0.21% Native American, 0.06% Asian, 0.03% Pacific Islander, 22.94% from other races, and 2.41% from two or more races. Hispanic or Latino of any race were 67.02% of the population.

There were 1,084 households, out of which 40.9% had children under the age of 18 living with them, 56.7% were married couples living together, 15.0% had a female householder with no husband present, and 22.9% were non-families. 20.3% of all households were made up of individuals, and 10.3% had someone living alone who was 65 years of age or older. The average household size was 3.02 and the average family size was 3.52.

In the city, the population was spread out, with 33.5% under the age of 18, 9.5% from 18 to 24, 25.1% from 25 to 44, 20.1% from 45 to 64, and 11.8% who were 65 years of age or older. The median age was 30 years. For every 100 females, there were 96.1 males. For every 100 females age 18 and over, there were 91.7 males.

The median income for a household in the city was $24,622, and the median income for a family was $32,065. Males had a median income of $28,571 versus $20,219 for females. The per capita income for the city was $11,573. About 20.7% of families and 25.8% of the population were below the poverty line, including 35.6% of those under age 18 and 22.9% of those age 65 or over.
