= McAllen Giants =

McAllen Giants/McAllen Palms
- 1949–1950; McAllen, Texas

Minor league affiliations
- Class: Class D (1949); Class C (1950)
- League: Rio Grande Valley League (1949–1950)

Major league affiliations
- Team: None

Minor league titles
- League titles (0): None
- Wild card berths (1): 1949

Team data
- Name: McAllen Giants (1949); McAllen Palms (1949–1950)
- Ballpark: Paris Field (1949); Palms Park (1949–1950)

The McAllen Giants were a minor league baseball franchise based in McAllen, Texas. In 1949, the Giants played as members of the Class D level Rio Grande Valley League, changing their name to the McAllen Palms in the middle of the season. The Palms remained in the league in 1950 as it moved up to Class C. The Giants initially were to host home games at Paris Field, but they moved to Palms Park during the 1949 season. The team qualified for the 1949 playoffs before finishing last in 1950, which proved to be the final season of the Rio Grande Valley League.

== History ==
Prior to the Giants' arrival, the most recent minor league team in McAllen was the 1938 McAllen Packers, who played as members of the Class D level Texas Valley League, which had reformed after a nine–season hiatus. Before that, the 1931 McAllen Palms had played in the Rio Grande Valley League, winning the championship after the league discontinued play in the middle of that season.

When the Rio Grande Valley League reformed in 1949, the Giants were one of six league members, joining the Brownsville Charros, Corpus Christi Aces, Del Rio Cowboys, Donna Cardinals and Laredo Apaches. The McAllen Giants were initially owned by Andrew J. Paris, who had gained national notoriety as the "Bubble Gum King" based on the fortune he had earned manufacturing bubble gum.

Paris planned to build a new ballpark for the Giants, which would be named Paris Field. To complete this project, Paris purchased a 15 acre plot, bulldozed a citrus grove that had stood on the land, and erected a structure that included a grandstand, fences, and lights. Before the season started, however, a group of landowners adjacent to the ballpark sued for an injunction, claiming that the lights and noise were a nuisance.

The jury found in Paris' favor, clearing the Giants to use Paris Field. Worn down by the opposition, however, Paris decided to sell the team to his business manager, Earle Halstead, who moved the team to a different ballpark where lights could be erected. After further battles with local officials and threats to leave town, the team opened play in a newly lighted ballpark on July 8 and changed their name from the McAllen Giants to the McAllen Palms.

In their first season of play, the 1949 McAllen team qualified for the four-team Rio Grande Valley League playoffs, placing fourth in the regular season standings with a record of 70–68. They were managed by Fran Matthews and Phil Kuykendall, and finished 18.0 games behind the 1st place Corpus Christi Aces in the final standings. In the playoffs, McAllen was swept in four games by Corpus Christi in the first round. McAllen pitcher Edward Arthur led the league with 198 strikeouts and teammate Harold Jackson had a 20–8 record, the best in the league.

In an effort to retain the Corpus Christi Aces, who led the league in attendance and well as in the standings, the Rio Grande Valley league became a Class C level league in 1950. The league also expanded to eight teams, although it finished with six teams after the Robstown Rebels and Donna-Weslaco Twins folded during the season. Earle Halstead, who decided that he did not want to operate the McAllen franchise in 1950, sold the team to a syndicate of seven businessmen, who assumed all of the team's assets including the lease on the lighted field, Palms Park.

The 1950 McAllen Palms finished a distant last in the Rio Grande Valley league final standings. With an average player age of 22.7, the Palms were by far the youngest team in the league. The team gained some notoriety by wearing colorful uniforms that featured cream colored shorts with cherry red waistbands. The Palms had a final record of 42–102, finishing 42.0 games behind the first place Harlingen Capitols and 33.5 games behind the fifth place Del Rio Cowboys. Managed by Boyd SoRelle and the returning Phil Kuykendall, McAllen did not qualify for the 1950 playoffs.

The Rio Grande Valley league did not return to play in 1951 and permanently folded. McAllen next hosted minor league baseball, with the 1977 McAllen Dusters, who played the season as members of the short lived Class A level Lone Star League.

== The ballparks ==
The McAllen Giants initially hosted minor league home games at Paris Field, which had a capacity of 3,000. Andrew Paris, the original franchise owner who built the ballpark, retained ownership of the 15-acre plot where it was built after he sold the team to Earle Halstead in May 1949. He then sold the property to a group of theater operators, who replaced the ballpark with a drive-in theater known as the Palms Drive-In. The drive-in, which was located on the southwest corner of Nolana and North 10th in the north part of McAllen, closed in 1962. The land is now occupied by various commercial and residential buildings.

Palms Park was located at 2010 South Main Street, one mile south of downtown McAllen. It occupied the same location as Legion Park, which hosted earlier McAllen teams including the 1931 McAllen Palms and the 1938 McAllen Packers. Aerial images and maps confirm that a ballpark continued to stand in this same location for much of the 20th century. The site is currently occupied by a wing of La Plaza Mall where a larger Dillard's store was added in a 1998 expansion of the mall. A small patch of empty land that was not used for the mall expansion remains just west of the former ballpark and still bears the "Palms Park" name.

== Timeline ==
| Year(s) | # Yrs. | Team | Level | League | Ballpark |
|---|---|---|---|---|---|
| 1949 | 1 | McAllen Giants; McAllen Palms | Class D | Rio Grande Valley League | Paris Field; Palms Park |
| 1950 | 1 | McAllen Palms | Class C | Rio Grande Valley League | Palms Park |

== Year–by–year records ==
| Year | Record | Finish | Manager | Attend | Playoffs/Notes |
|---|---|---|---|---|---|
| 1949 | 70–68 | 4th | Fran Matthews / Phil Kuykendall | 22,598 | Lost 1st round |
| 1950 | 42–102 | 6th | Boyd SoRelle / Phil Kuykendall | 32,473 | Did not qualify |

== Notable alumni ==
- No McAllen Giants alumni advanced to the major leagues.

== See also ==
- McAllen Palms
- McAllen Dusters
- McAllen Packers
