= Donna Cardinals =

- 1949–1950; Donna, Texas

Minor league affiliations
- Class: Class D (1949); Class C 1950)
- League: Rio Grande Valley League (1949–1950)

Major league affiliations
- Team: None

Minor league titles
- League titles (0): None

Team data
- Name: Donna Cardinals (1949); Donna-Weslaco Twins (1950)
- Ballpark: Avila Park

The Donna Cardinals were a minor league baseball team based in Donna, Texas. In 1949 and 1950, Donna based teams played exclusively as members of the Rio Grande Valley League. The 1950 Donna-Weslaco Twins played in partnership with neighboring Weslaco, Texas. Donna hosted minor league games at Avila Park.

== History ==
Minor league baseball began in Donna, Texas in 1949. The Donna Cardinals became members of the Class D level Rio Grande Valley League. The Brownsville Charros, Corpus Christi Aces, Del Rio Cowboys, Laredo Apaches and McAllen Giants teams joined Donna in beginning league play.

After beginning league play on April 27, 1949, Donna relocated during the season. On June 6, 1949, the Cardinals had a 13–25 record when the franchise moved to Robstown, Texas. Finishing the season as the Robstown Cardinals, the Donna/Robstown team finished last in the league standings. With an overall record of 49–93, the team placed sixth playing under managers Russell Frisch, Charlie Engle and Mimi Cavazos while finishing 43.0 games behind the first place Corpus Christi Aces. Donna/Robstown finished behind Corpus Christi (89–51), the Laredo Apaches (80–60), Brownsville Charros (75–65), McAllen Giants (70–68) and Del Rio Cowboys (58–80) in the final standings.

The 1950 Donna-Weslaco Twins briefly returned to Rio Grande Valley League play, as the Rio Grande Valley League expanded. The team name reflected the team partnership with neighboring Weslaco, Texas. The 1950 Rio Grande Valley League became a Class C level league, expanding to eight teams, adding the Harlingen Capitals and the Donna-Weslaco team, as Robstown continued play as the Robstown Rebels. On May 4, 1950, Donna-Weslaco had a record of 4–20 when the team permanently folded. G.C. Quin served as manager. The Rio Grande Valley League permanently folded following the 1950 season.

Donna, Texas has not hosted another minor league team.

== The ballpark ==
Both of Donna's minor league teams played home games at Avila Park, which was located midway between Donna and Weslaco.

== Timeline ==
Year(s)	# Yrs.	Team	Level	League
1949 (1)	1	Donna Cardinals	Class D	Rio Grande Valley League
1949 (2)	1	Robstown Cardinals	Class D	Rio Grande Valley League
1950	1	Donna-Weslaco Twins	Class C	Rio Grande Valley League

== Year–by–year records ==
Year	Record	Finish	Manager	Notes
1949	49–93	6th	Russell Frisch / Charlie Engle / Mimi Cavazos	Donna (13–25) moved to Robstown June 6.
1950	4–20	NA	G. C. Quin	Team folded May 4

== Notable alumni ==
- Vicente Amor (1950)
- Charlie Engle (1949, MGR)
