= Robstown Rebels =

- 1949–1950; Robstown, Texas

Minor league affiliations
- Class: Class D (1949); Class C 1950)
- League: Rio Grande Valley League (1949–1950)

Major league affiliations
- Team: None

Minor league titles
- League titles (0): None

Team data
- Name: Robstown Cardinals (1949); Robstown Rebels (1950)
- Ballpark: Sun Spot Ball Park (1949–1950)

The Robstown Rebels were a minor league baseball team based in Robstown, Texas in 1949 and 1950. Preceded by the 1949 Robstown Cardinals, the Robstown teams played exclusively as members of the Rio Grande Valley League, playing partial seasons in both years. Robstown hosted home minor league games at the Sun Spot Ball Park.

== History ==
Minor league baseball began in Robstown, Texas in 1949, after the Donna team relocated. The 1949 Donna Cardinals began the season as members of the six–team, Class D level Rio Grande Valley League. The Brownsville Charros, Corpus Christi Aces, Del Rio Cowboys, Laredo Apaches and McAllen Giants joined Donna in beginning league play on April 27, 1949.

On June 2, 1949, Gordon Bishop, one of the owners of Sun Spot Ball Park, announced plans to raise funds to acquire the Donna franchise and move it to Robstown. The Donna Cardinals moved to Robstown on June 6, 1949 with a 13–25 record. Completing the 1949 season with a record of 36–78 as the Robstown Cardinals, the Donna/Robstown team finished last in the league standings with an overall record of 49–93. The team placed sixth, playing the season under managers Russell Frisch, Charlie Engle and Mimi Cavazos. The Cardinals finished 43.0 games behind the first place Corpus Christi Aces in the final regular season standings. Donna/Robstown finished behind Corpus Christi (89–51), the Laredo Apaches (80–60), Brownsville Charros (75–65), McAllen Giants (70–68) and Del Rio Cowboys (58–80) in the standings.

Continuing play, Robstown hired Fabian Kowalik as manager in 1950, luring him out of retirement from operating a successful beer distributorship.

The 1950 Robstown "Rebels" continued Rio Grande Valley League play, as the Rio Grande Valley League expanded. The 1950 Rio Grande Valley League became a Class C level league, expanding to eight teams. The league added the Harlingen Capitals and the Donna-Weslaco Twins as the two new franchises, as Robstown continued play as the Robstown Rebels. League officials voted to remove Robstown from the league on May 15, 1950, citing the haphazard operation of the franchise and the lack of significant gate receipts. The Rebels had a record of 13–18 when the team folded, as Fabian Kowalik served as manager. The Rio Grande Valley League permanently folded following the 1950 season.

Robstown was without minor league baseball until the 2009 Coastal Bend Thunder began a two-season tenure as members of the independent United League Baseball.

== The ballpark ==
The 1949 and 1950 Robstown teams hosted minor league home games at the Sun Spot Ball Park, which had previously hosted the Sun Spot Bottlers semi-pro team managed by Garland Bishop, owner of the minor league franchise. The facility was constructed in 1948 and had hosted rodeos and black baseball contests in addition to Sun Spot Bottlers games. The ballpark expanded capacity from 800 in 1949 to 2,200 in 1950. Although certain sources claim Sun Spot Ball Park was located at 118 East Main Avenue, property records reveal that this is a narrow commercial lot too small to accommodate a baseball field, and aerial photos from that time show that the entire block was filled with commercial buildings. Panning west in the same aerial view, a ballpark can be found at the southeast corner of Kansas Street and Laurel Street, with the catcher facing southeast. That facility is also depicted in a 1956 map. The ballpark location is now occupied by a residential neighborhood.

== Timeline ==
Year(s)	# Yrs.	Team	Level	League
1949 (1)	1	Donna Cardinals	Class D	Rio Grande Valley League
1949 (2)	1	Robstown Cardinals	Class D	Rio Grande Valley League
1950	1	Robstown Rebels	Class C	Rio Grande Valley League

== Year–by–year record ==
Year	Record	Finish	Manager	Attend	Notes
1949	49–93	6th	Russell Frisch / Charlie Engle / Mimi Cavazos	19,753	Donna (13–25) moved to Robstown June 6.
1950	13–18	NA	Fabian Kowalik	6,637	Team folded May 13

== Notable alumni ==
- Charlie Engle (1949, MGR)
- Fabian Kowalik (1950, MGR)
