= Rio Grande Valley League =

Minor baseball league in Texas

- Classification: Class D (1931, 1949); Class C (1950)
- Sport: Minor League Baseball
- First season: 1931
- Folded: 1950
- President: George P. Blevins (1931); C.F.C. Ladd (1931); William R. Byrd (1949–1950); Kelly Nemeck (1950)
- No. of teams: 10
- Country: United States of America
- Most titles: 1 McAllen Palms (1931); Corpus Christi Aces (1949); Harlingen Capitols (1930)
- Related competitions: East Texas League

The Rio Grande Valley League was a minor league baseball league, with franchises based exclusively in Texas. The Rio Grande Valley League had two incarnations, playing in 1931 and 1949 to 1950.

== History ==
In 1931, the league initially featured the Corpus Christi Seahawks of Corpus Christi, the Harlingen Ladds of Harlingen, the McAllen Palms of McAllen and the San Benito Saints of San Benito. Corpus Christi moved to La Feria to become the La Feria Nighthawks in June. The league disbanded on July 30. McAllen finished in first place with a 55–37 record; they also won the league playoff against La Feria 3 games to 0. Johnny Rizzo, who played in the major leagues from 1938 to 1942, played for Corpus Christi/La Feria. Tex Covington managed McAllen.

The league returned as a Class D level circuit in 1949, featuring the Donna Cardinals of Donna, the Corpus Christi Aces, the Laredo Apaches of Laredo, the Brownsville Charros of Brownsville, the McAllen Giants and the Del Rio Cowboys of Del Rio. On June 6, Donna moved to Robstown to become the Robstown Cardinals. Charlie Engle managed Donna/Robstown for part of the season. Corpus Christi finished first in the standings and faced McAllen in the postseason, winning 4 games to 0. Brownsville matched against Laredo and won 4 games to 2. In the finals, Corpus Christi beat Brownsville 4 games to 0.

In 1950, the league became a Class C level circuit. Laredo, Corpus Christi, Brownsville, McAllen and Del Rio returned from 1949. Robstown became the Robstown Rebels. Donna and Weslaco featured the Donna-Weslaco Twins. Harlingen featured the Harlingen Capitals. On May 4, Donna-Weslaco disbanded; Robstown did the same on May 13. The playoffs had first-place finisher Harlingen beating Brownsville 4 games to 2. and Corpus Christi beating Laredo 4 games to 1. In the finals, Corpus Christi beat Harlingen 4 games to 1. Notably, Sam Harshaney managed Harlingen, Leonardo Alanís and Jack Smith managed Laredo, John Davis managed Corpus Christi and Fabian Kowalik managed Robstown. Monty Stratton, Joe Koppe, Dick Midkiff and Vicente Amor played in the league that year.

== Cities represented ==
- Brownsville, TX: Brownsville Charros 1949–1950
- Corpus Christi, TX: Corpus Christi Seahawks 1931; Corpus Christi Aces 1949–1950
- Del Rio, TX: Del Rio Cowboys 1949–1950
- Donna, TX: Donna Cardinals 1949
- Donna–Weslaco, TX: Donna-Weslaco Twins 1950
- Harlingen, TX: Harlingen Ladds 1931; Harlingen Capitols 1950
- La Feria, TX: La Feria Nighthawks 1931
- Laredo, TX: Laredo Apaches 1949–1950
- McAllen, TX: McAllen Palms 1931; McAllen Giants 1949–1950
- Robstown, TX: Robstown Cardinals 1949; Robstown Rebels 1950
- San Benito, TX: San Benito Saints 1931

== Standings & statistics ==
=== 1931 Rio Grande Valley League ===
schedule

Team Standings	W	L	PCT	GB	Managers
McAllen Palms	55	37	.598	--	Tex Covington
Corpus Christi Seahawks / La Feria Nighthawks	49	46	.516	7.5	Pat Withers / Ray Pipken
Harlingen Ladds	43	49	.467	12.0	Paul Trammel
San Benito Saints	40	55	.421	16.5	Bishop Clements / Elgar Waitman

Corpus Christi (20–23) moved to La Feria June 5. La Feria played its home games at Harlingen.
The league disbanded July 30.
Playoff: McAllen 3 games, La Feria 0.

Player statistics
Player	Team	Stat	Tot	Player	Team	Stat	Tot
Johnny Rizzo	Corpus/La Feria	BA	.385	Adrian Johnson	Harlingen	W	14
Frank Denson	McAllen	Runs	99	Adrian Johnson	Harlingen	SO	148
Frank Denson	McAllen	Hits	109	Horace Hardy	McAllen	Pct	.786; 11–3
Harry Bonds	McAllen	HR	8				
Frank Denson	McAllen	SB	70				

=== 1949 Rio Grande Valley League ===
schedule

Team Standings	W	L	PCT	GB	Attend	Managers
Corpus Christi Aces	89	51	.686	--	97,192	William Gann
Laredo Apaches	80	60	.571	9.0	47,857	William Cearley / Ishmael Montalvo
Brownsville Charros	75	65	.536	14.0	51,416	Joseph King
McAllen Giants	70	68	.507	18.0	22,598	Frank Matthews / Philip Kuykendall
Del Rio Cowboys	58	80	.420	30.0	32,323	Boyd SoRelle
Donna Cardinals / Robstown Cardinals	45	93	.326	43.0	19,753	Russell Frisch / Charlie Engle / Mimi Cavazos

Donna moved to Robstown June 6.
Playoffs: Corpus Christi 4 games, McAllen 0; Brownsville 4 games, Laredo 2.
Finals: Corpus Christi 4 games, Brownsville 0.

Player statistics
Player	Team	Stat	Tot	Player	Team	Stat	Tot
Joseph King	Brownsville	BA	.354	Gilberto Garza	Laredo	W	21
Lloyd Pearson	Corpus Christi	Runs	140	Edward Arthur	McAllen	SO	178
Bernard Pardue	Corpus Christi	Hits	205	Robert Wiltse	Brownsville	ERA	2.08
Don Petschow	Brownsville	RBI	146	Harold Jackson	McAllen	PCT	.741 20–7
Don Petschow	Brownsville	HR	28				

=== 1950 Rio Grande Valley League ===
schedule

Team standings	W	L	PCT	GB	Attend	Managers
Harlingen Capitols	86	62	.581	-	80,001	Sam Harshaney
Laredo Apaches	84	62	.575	1.0	57,948	Leo Najo / Jack Smith / Manuel Salvatierra
Corpus Christi Aces	79	64	.552	4.5	68,313	Red Davis
Brownsville Charros	80	67	.544	5.5	56,146	Joseph King
Del Rio Cowboys	76	69	.524	8.5	30,568	Robert Hamric
McAllen Giants	42	102	.292	42.0	32,473	Boyd SoRelle / Philip Kuykendall
Robstown Rebels	13	18	.419	NA	6,637	Fabian Kowalik
Donna-Weslaco Twins	4	20	.167	NA	3,008	Baldy Quinn

Donna-Weslaco disbanded May 4; Robstown disbanded May 13.
Playoffs: Harlingen 4 games, Brownsville 2; Corpus Christi 4 games, Laredo 1.
Finals: Corpus Christi 4 games, Harlingen 1.

Player statistics
Player	Team	Stat	Tot	Player	Team	Stat	Tot
Lloyd Pearson	Corpus Christi	BA	.383	Dick Midkiff	Del Rio	W	22
Joe Koppe	Corpus Christi	Runs	181	William Guthrie	Harlingen	SO	195
Lloyd Pearson	Corpus Christi	Hits	207	Dick Midkiff	Del Rio	ERA	3.77
Jesse McClain	Harlingen	Hits	207	Dick Midkiff	Del Rio	PCT	.733 22–8
Jesse McClain	Harlingen	RBI	173				
Jesse McClain	Harlingen	HR	53				
