= McAllen Packers =

- 1938; McAllen, Texas

Minor league affiliations
- Class: Class D (1938)
- League: Texas Valley League (1938)

Major league affiliations
- Team: None

Minor league titles
- League titles (0): None

Team data
- Name: McAllen Packers (1938)
- Ballpark: Legion Park (1938)

The McAllen Packers were a minor league baseball franchise based in McAllen, Texas. In 1938, the Packers played as members of the Class D level Texas Valley League, hosting home games at Legion Park.

== History ==
The Packers were preceded by the 1931 McAllen Palms, who played one season as members of the Class D level Rio Grande Valley League, winning the league championship in a shortened season, as the league folded following the season.

The McAllen "Packers" began minor league play as members of the 1938 Texas Valley League. After a nine–season hiatus, the Texas Valley League reformed as a six–team Class D level league, with the Brownsville Charros, Corpus Christi Spudders, Harlingen Hubs, Refugio Oilers and Taft Cardinals joining McAllen as league members, beginning play on April 14, 1938.

The "Packers" nickname ties to the local agriculture industry in McAllen and the surrounding region. In the era, numerous packing facilities were in operation to pack produce for distribution to other regions.

The Packers finished the regular season in fifth place in the overall final standings. During the season, the Texas Valley League adopted a split–season schedule. McAllen was in fifth place with a 28–40 record on June 24, 1938, in the final first–half standings, following first place Corpus Christi, second place Harlingen, third place Taft and fourth place Refugio.

McAllen placed fifth and ended the 1938 regular season with an overall record of 65–72, playing the season under managers Ray Friday and Wally Kopp. The Packers finished 27.5 games behind the first place Corpus Christi Spudders in the final regular season standings. McAllen did not qualify 1938 four–team Texas Valley League playoffs.

The final Texas Valley League regular season standings were led by the Corpus Christi Spudders (92–44), who finished 8.5 games ahead of the second place Harlingen Hubs (84–53), with Taft (68–67) and Refugio (67–67) finishing in third place and fourth place to qualify for the four–team playoffs. Corpus Christi had won the first-half of the split–season schedule and tied with Harlingen for the second–half championship. The McAllen Packers (65–72) and Brownsville Charros (30–103) finished in fifth and sixth place, missing the playoffs. In the league finals, Harlingen defeated Corpus Christi to win the title. Both Harlingen (Detroit Tigers) and Corpus Christi (St. Louis Browns) were major league affiliate teams, the only two affiliated teams in the league.

Following the 1938 season, the Texas Valley League permanently folded. McAllen next hosted minor league baseball, with the 1949 McAllen Giants, who resumed play in the Class D level Rio Grande Valley League.

== The ballpark ==
The McAllen Packers hosted minor league home games at Legion Park. Legion Park was created in 1927 on land owned by the City of McAllen that was leased to the American Legion. Legion Park had previously served as a spring training site for the Class A Wichita Aviators (baseball). The ballpark hosted an exhibition game that spring between the Aviators and the Major League Baseball New York Giants (baseball), with seating capacity being increased to 3,000 in preparation for the contest.

The exact location of Legion Park was described as one mile south of the post office on the west side of the road. The post office at the time was located at the corner of South Main Street and what is now Beaumont Avenue in downtown McAllen. Aerial images and maps confirm that a ballpark continued to stand in this same location for much of the 20th century. In later days, that facility was called "Palms Park," matching the name used for the 1931 McAllen Palms. The address of this facility was 2010 South Main. The site is currently occupied by a wing of La Plaza Mall where a larger Dillard's store was added in a 1998 expansion of the mall. A small patch of empty land that was not used for the mall expansion remains just west of the former ballpark and still bears the "Palms Park" name.

== Year–by–year record ==
Year	Record	Finish	Manager	Playoffs/Notes
1938	65–72	5th	Ray Friday / Wally Kopp	Did not qualify

== Notable alumni ==
- Leonardo Alanís (1938)

== See also ==
- McAllen Palms
- McAllen Giants
- McAllen Dusters
