= Corpus Christi Seagulls =

- 1976–1977; Corpus Christi, Texas

Minor league affiliations
- Class: Class A (1976–1977)
- League: Gulf States League (1976); Lone Star League (1977)

Major league affiliations
- Team: None

Minor league titles
- League titles (2): 1976; 1977

Team data
- Name: Corpus Christi Seagulls (1976–1977)
- Ballpark: Cabaniss Field (1976–1977)

The Corpus Christi Seagulls were a minor league baseball team based in Corpus Christi, Texas in 1976 and 1977. The Seagulls played as members of the Class A level Gulf States League in 1976 and Lone Star League in 1977, winning the league championship in both seasons under player/manager Leo Mazzone. The Seagulls hosted minor league home games at Cabaniss Field.

== History ==
The first minor league team based in Corpus Christi was the 1910 Corpus Christi Pelicans, who played as charter members of the Southwest Texas League. The Seagulls were preceded by the 1959 Corpus Christi Giants of the Texas League.

In 1976, local advertising businessman Terry Ferrell led a successful effort to place a minor league team in Corpus Christi. Ferrell gained approval from the Corpus Christi Independent School District school board to obtain a lease of Cabaniss Field. The ballpark required upgrades to meet minor league requirements and the team spent approximately $20,000 on improvements to the ballpark, adding box seats, an eight–foot wooden fence, with upgrades to the press box and concession areas. Seats were painted in the Seagulls' selected team color, bright aqua.

In 1976, the Corpus Christi Seagulls began play as charter members of the Class A level Gulf States League, which formed as a six–team league. The Baton Rouge Cougars, Beeville Bees, Rio Grande Valley White Wings, Seguin Toros and Victoria Cowboys joined the Seagulls in beginning league play on June 1, 1976.

On June 3, 1976, the Seagulls hosted their first home game at Cabaniss Field. With 5,000 in attendance, Corpus Christi defeated the Rio Grande Valley White Wings by the score of 12–8.

In their first season of play, the Corpus Christi Seagulls won both the Gulf States League pennant and championship. Managed by Leo Mazzone, the Seagulls ended the 1976 season with a record of 50–27, placing first in the regular season standings, finishing 2.5 games ahead of the second place Baton Rouge Cougars. In the playoff Finals, Corpus Christi swept the Seguin Toros in three games to win the championship. The Seagulls scored 556 total runs, most in the league.

The Gulf Coast League evolved into the Lone Star League in 1977, with the Corpus Christi Seagulls continuing play at Cabaniss Field, playing again under returning manager Leo Mazzone. Joining Corpus Christi in the new league were the Beeville Blazers, Harlingen Suns, McAllen Dusters, Texas City Stars and Victoria Rosebuds, with play beginning on June 10, 1977.

The Corpus Christi Seagulls repeated their championship and won the 1977 Lone Star League championship in their final season of play. The Seagulls again placed first in the final standings, ending the 1977 regular season with 53–27 record. Corpus Christi finished 12.0 games ahead of the second place Harlingen Suns. The Seagulls led the league with 533 runs scored and allowed 402 runs, least in the league. The potential 1977 Lone Star League playoffs were cancelled due to the threat of the approaching Hurricane Anita, allowing Corpus Christi to claim the championship.

The Seagulls were unable to defend their championships when the Lone Star League permanently folded following the 1977 season. Corpus Christi was without minor league baseball until the 1994 Corpus Christi Barracudas began play as members of the independent Texas-Louisiana League.

== The ballpark ==
In both 1976 and 1977, the Corpus Christi Seagulls hosted minor league games at Cabaniss Field. Today, the ballpark remains home to Corpus Christi Independent School District baseball teams.

== Timeline ==
Year(s)	# Yrs.	Team	Level	League	Ballpark
1976	1	Corpus Christi Seagulls	Class A	Gulf States League	Cabaniss Field
1977	1	Corpus Christi Seagulls	Class A	Lone Star League	Cabaniss Field

== Year–by–year record ==
Year	Record	Finish	Manager	Attend	Playoffs/Notes
1976	50–27	1st	Leo Mazzone	74,280	Won pennant League champions
1977	53–27	1st	Leo Mazzone	92,137	League champions

== Notable alumni ==
- Leo Mazzone (1976–1977, MGR)
