= La Feria Nighthawks =

- 1931; La Feria, Texas

Minor league affiliations
- Class: Class D (1931)
- League: Rio Grande Valley League (1931)

Major league affiliations
- Team: None

Minor league titles
- League titles (0): None
- Conference titles (1): 1931

Team data
- Name: La Feria Nighthawks (1931)
- Ballpark: Unknown (1931)

Playing a partial season in 1931, the La Feria Nighthawks were a minor league baseball team based in La Feria, Texas. La Feria played as members of the Class D level Rio Grande Valley League in their only season of minor league play. The team was established when the Corpus Christi Seahawks franchise moved to La Feria during the season. The Nighthawks won the second–half pennant and lost in the league finals. La Feria played home games in Harlingen, Texas.

== History ==
La Feria gained its first minor league team during the 1931 season. The 1931 Class D level Rio Grande Valley League began the season with the Corpus Christi Seahawks, Harlingen Ladds, McAllen Palms and the San Benito Saints playing as charter members of the newly formed league. The league began play on April 22, 1931.

On June 4, 1931, the Corpus Christi Seagulls team moved to La Feria, Texas and became known as the "Nighthawks." Corpus Christi had a record of 20–23 at the time of the move to La Feria.

La Feria played their first minor league home game on June 10, 1931. The Nighthawks hosted home games at a ballpark in neighboring Harlingen, Texas.

During their first season of league play, the Rio Grande Valley League folded on July 30, 1931. Despite folding, the league held finals that featured La Feria. The Nighthawks finished the season in second place overall, qualifying for the playoffs by winning the second–half title in the split–schedule season. The Nighthawks finished the 1931 overall regular season with a record of 49–46, playing under managers Ray Pipkin and Fincher Withers. The team compiled a 29–23 record while based in La Feria. McAllen won the first half pennant and finished 7.5 games ahead of the second place Seahawks/Nighthawks in the final overall standings. In the 1931 finals, the Nighthawks lost to the McAllen Palms, who swept La Feria in three games.

Nighthawks player Johnny Rizzo won the Rio Grande Valley League batting championship, hitting .385 for the season.

Following the shortened 1931 season, the Rio Grande Valley League reformed in 1949 with the Corpus Christi Aces as a member. La Feria, Texas has not hosted another minor league team.

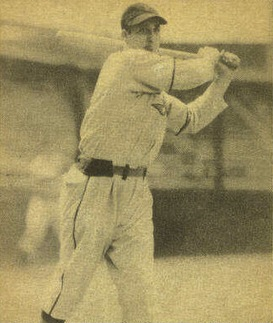
(1940) Johnny Rizzo Play Ball baseball card. Rizzo won the 1931 Rio Grande Valley League batting title playing for La Feria.

== The ballpark ==
The name of the ballpark for 1931 home La Feria Nighthawks minor league games is unknown. The club played their home games at Harlingen, Texas.

== Year–by–year record ==
Year	Record	Finish	Manager	Playoffs/Notes
1931	49–46	2nd	Ray Pipkin / Fincher Withers	Corpus Christi (20–23) moved to La Feria June 4 Won 2nd half pennant Lost in finals

== Notable alumni ==
- Johnny Rizzo (1931)
