= McAllen Palms =

- 1931; McAllen, Texas

Minor league affiliations
- Class: Class D (1931)
- League: Rio Grande Valley League (1931)

Major league affiliations
- Team: None

Minor league titles
- League titles (1): 1931
- Conference titles (1): 1931

Team data
- Name: McAllen Palms (1931)
- Ballpark: Legion Park/Palm Park

The McAllen Palms were a minor league baseball team based in McAllen, Texas. In 1931, the Palms played as members of the Class D level Rio Grande Valley League, winning the league championship in a shortened season.

== History ==
Prior to 1931, McAllen had briefly hosted two other minor league franchises. The first was a team in the 1926 Class D Gulf Coast League, also called the McAllen Palms. That team was formed after the Kingsville Jerseys moved to McAllen on July 3, but it only lasted through July 9, after which the team moved again and became the Mission Grapefruiters. The second franchise was a 1928 "McAllen" team, which was formed as a member of the Class D level Texas Valley League. Hank Doty was named as manager of the team, and arrangements had been made for the team to play at Legion Park, which was located one mile south of downtown McAllen. Before the season opened, however, the owners of the Mission Grapefruiters, an established franchise in the league, objected to the new McAllen franchise because McAllen is only seven miles east of Mission, Texas and the Grapefruiters had been assured of territorial rights extending 10 miles. The league responded by withdrawing the franchise from McAllen and reassigning the team's players to a new franchise in Harlingen, Texas.

A more lasting version of the McAllen Palms began play in 1931. The four–team, Class D level Rio Grande Valley League began the season with the Corpus Christi Seahawks, Harlingen Ladds and San Benito Saints joining McAllen in beginning league play on April 22, 1931. On June 4, 1931, Corpus Christi moved to become the La Feria Nighthawks.

The "Palms" nickname corresponds to local agriculture in the era. Palm trees became prevalent in the area and were harvested. McAllen is nicknamed as "The City of Palms."

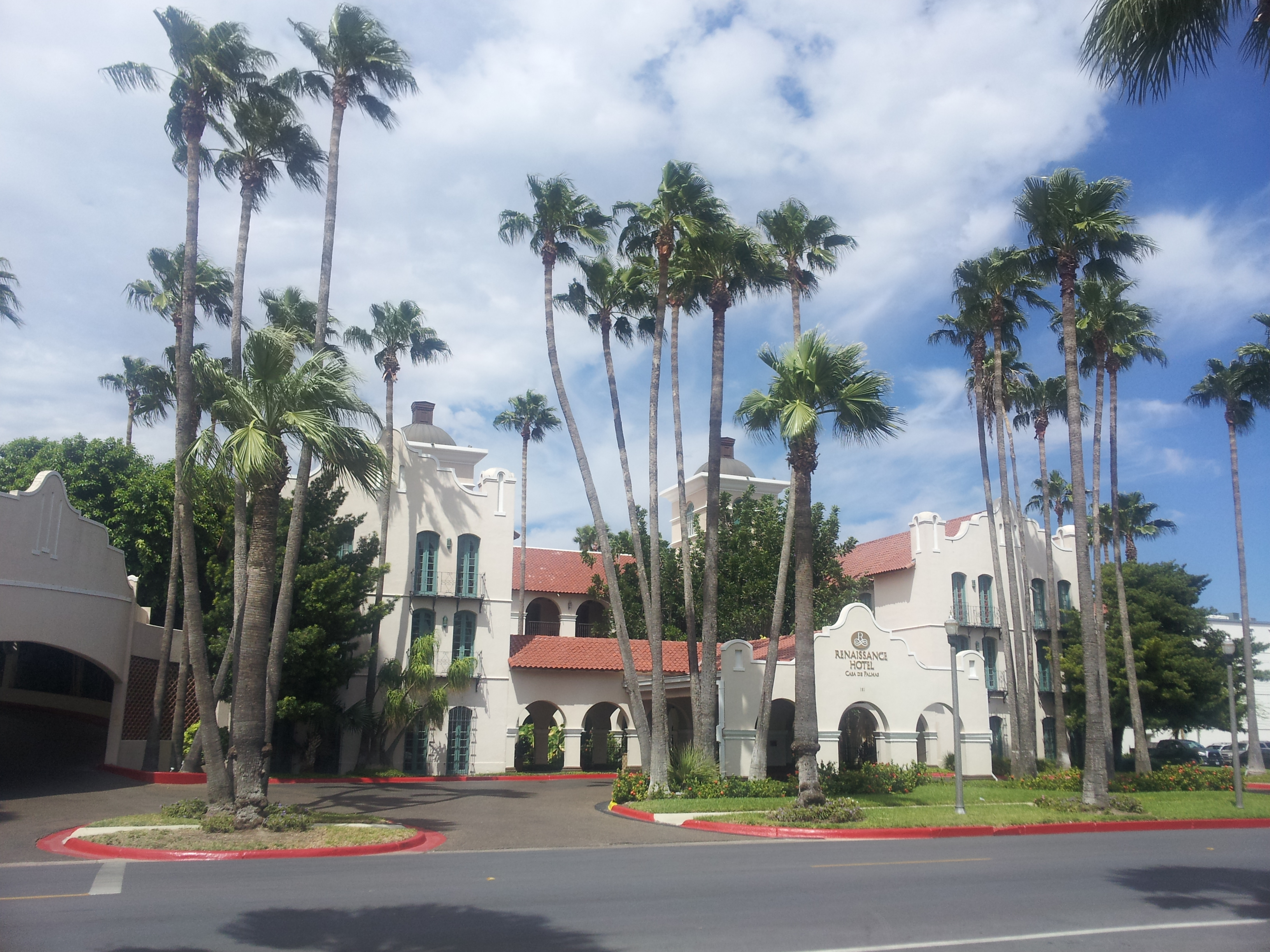
(2012) Casa de Palmas. McAllen, Texas. National Register of Historic Places.

During its first season of league play, the Rio Grande Valley League folded on July 30, 1931, with the Palms in first place. Despite folding, the league held finals that featured McAllen vs. La Feria. The Palms were in first place overall when the league folded, finishing the 1931 overall regular season with a record of 55–37, playing under manager Tex Covington. McAllen won the first-half pennant and finished 7.5 games ahead of the Seahawks/Nighthawks in the final overall standings. The Palms played La Feria in a playoff, after the Nighthawks won the second–half title in the split–schedule season. In the 1931 finals, the McAllen Palms swept La Feria in three games. The playoff was scheduled as a seven-game series, but after losing the third game by a 14–13 score the Nighthawks decided to concede the championship to the Palms.

Harry Bonds of McAllen led the Rio Grande Valley League with eight home runs, while teammate Frank Denson led the league with 70 stolen bases, 109 total hits and 99 runs scored. Palms pitcher Horace Hardy led the league with an 11–3 record.

Following the 1931 season, the Rio Grande Valley League did not return to play in 1932. McAllen next hosted the 1938 McAllen Packers, who played as members of the Class D level Texas Valley League, which reformed after a nine–season hiatus.

== The ballpark ==
The 1931 McAllen Palms played home games under the lights at Legion Park, which the press referred to as Palm Park in reports produced during the season. Legion Park was created in 1927 on land owned by the City of McAllen that was leased to the American Legion. It was located on South Main Street south of downtown McAllen, on a road that was paved in early 1930 to accommodate traffic generated by the use of Legion Park as a spring training site for the Class A Wichita Aviators (baseball) and an exhibition game featuring the Major League Baseball New York Giants (baseball). Seating capacity was increased to 3,000 in preparation for the Giants game.

The exact location of Legion Park was described as one mile south of the post office on the west side of the road. The post office at the time was located at the corner of South Main Street and what is now Beaumont Avenue in downtown McAllen. Aerial images and maps confirm that a ballpark continued to stand in this same location for much of the 20th century. That facility continued to bear the "Palms Park" name, with the address being given as 2010 South Main. The site is currently occupied by a wing of La Plaza Mall where a larger Dillard's store was added in a 1998 expansion of the mall. A small patch of empty land that was not used for the mall expansion remains just west of the former ballpark and still bears the "Palms Park" name.

== Year–by–year record ==
Year	Record	Finish	Manager	Playoffs/Notes
1931	55–37	1st	Tex Covington	Won 1st half pennant League champions

== Notable alumni ==
- Tex Covington (1931, MGR)
- The complete player roster for the 1931 McAllen Palms is unknown.
