= McAllen Dusters =

- 1977; McAllen, Texas

Minor league affiliations
- Class: Class A (1977)
- League: Lone Star League (1977)

Major league affiliations
- Team: None

Minor league titles
- League titles (0): None

Team data
- Name: McAllen Dusters (1977)
- Ballpark: McAllen High School Field (1977)

The McAllen Dusters were a minor league baseball franchise based in McAllen, Texas. In 1977, the Dusters played as members of the Class A level Lone Star League, hosting home games at the McAllen High School Field. The Dusters finished last in 1977, which proved to be the final season of the league.

== History ==
The Dusters were preceded in minor league play by the 1950 McAllen Giants, who played as members of the Class D level Rio Grande Valley League.

In 1977, the McAllen "Dusters" played the season as members of the short–lived, six–team, Class A level Lone Star League. The Beeville Blazers, Corpus Christi Seagulls, Harlingen Suns, Texas City Stars and Victoria Rosebuds joined McAllen in beginning league play on June 10, 1977.

The Dusters began the season with a record of 9–21, their nickname reflective of crop dusting and continual windy conditions in McAllen.

The McAllen Dusters ended the 1977 Lone Star League season with an overall record of 33–45, finishing last in the league standings. Playing the season under managers Shannon Kelly and Jack Allen, McAllen finished 19.0 games behind the 1st place Corpus Christi Seagulls. The league did not hold playoffs as a hurricane hit the region just after the season ended. The Dusters scored the fewest runs in the league. Duster players Jim Willis drove in 48 runs to lead the team, while Barry Scarpellino hit .303. Pitcher Thomas Linnert led the team with 7 wins, while Joseph Laniak recorded a 3.17 ERA. The Lone Star League permanently folded following the 1977 season.

McAllen next hosted minor league baseball in 2011, when the McAllen Thunder began play as members of the independent North American League.

== The ballpark ==
The McAllen Dusters hosted 1977 minor league home games at the McAllen High School Field. The Dusters franchise rented the ballfield from the high school to host 1977 league games. McAllen High School is located at 2021 La Vista Avenue.

== Year–by–year record ==
Year	Record	Finish	Manager	Attend	Playoffs/Notes
1977	33–45	6th	Shannon Kelly / Jack Allen	35,752	No playoffs held

== Notable alumni ==
- No McAllen Dusters alumni advanced to the major leagues.

== See also ==
- McAllen Palms
- McAllen Giants
- McAllen Packers
