= San Benito Saints =

- 1931; San Benito, Texas

Minor league affiliations
- Class: Class D (1931)
- League: Rio Grande Valley League (1931)

Major league affiliations
- Team: None

Minor league titles
- League titles (0): None

Team data
- Name: San Benito Saints (1931)
- Ballpark: San Benito Base Ball Park (1931)

The San Benito Saints were a minor league baseball team based in San Benito, Texas. In 1931, San Benito played as members of the Class D level Rio Grande Valley League, finishing in last place in their only season of minor league play. The Saints hosted home games at the San Benito Base Ball Park.

== History ==
Prior to the minor league San Benito "Saints," a semi–professional team of the same name played for many seasons in San Benito.

In 1931, the Class D level Rio Grande Valley League formed. The league began the season with the Corpus Christi Seahawks, Harlingen Ladds and McAllen Palms joining the San Benito Saints in playing as charter members. The league began play on April 22, 1931. On June 4, 1931, the Corpus Christi Seagulls moved to La Feria to become the La Feria Nighthawks.

For hitting home runs, San Benito players received a free barbershop visit.

The Rio Grande Valley League folded during the season. On July 30, 1931, the league folded with the Saints in last place in the final standings. The Saints ended the season in fourth place overall. San Benito ended the 1931 overall regular season with a record of 40–55, playing the season under managers Bishop Clements and Elgar Waitman. McAllen finished 7.5 games ahead of the second place Seahawks/Nighthawks in the final overall standings, with San Benito 16.5 games behind McAllen. The league did hold finals, where McAllen swept La Feria.

Following the 1931 season, the Rig Grande Valley League folded. San Benito, Texas has not hosted another minor league team.

== The ballpark ==
The 1931 San Benito Saints hosted home minor league games at the San Benito Ball Park. The ballpark was located at North Fannin & West Heywood Street, next to the Hondo River.

== Year–by–year records ==
Year	Record	Finish	Manager	Playoffs/Notes
1931	40–55	4th	Bishop Clements / Elgar Waitman	Did not qualify

== Notable alumni ==
No San Benito alumni advanced to the major leagues.

On June 10, 1931, the Saints signed 3B "Cotton" Williams, C Dutch Hoffman and 2B Eddie Williford to the roster.
