= Seguin Toros =

- 1976; Seguin, Texas

Minor league affiliations
- Class: Class A (1976)
- League: Gulf States League (1976)

Major league affiliations
- Team: None

Minor league titles
- League titles (0): None
- Wild card berths (1): 1976

Team data
- Name: Seguin Toros (1976)
- Ballpark: Fairgrounds Ball Park (1976)

The Seguin Toros were a minor league baseball team based in Seguin, Texas. In 1976, the Toros played in the only season of the 1976 Class A level Gulf States League, advancing to the league finals in their only season of play. Seguin hosted minor league home games at the Fairgrounds Ball Park, now named Smokey Joe Williams Field in honor of Smokey Joe Williams.

== History ==
Minor league baseball was formed in Seguin, Texas in 1976. The Seguin "Toros" became charter members of the six–team, Class A level Gulf States League. The Baton Rouge Cougars, Beeville Bees, Corpus Christi Seagulls, Rio Grande Valley WhiteWings (Harlingen, Texas) and Victoria Cowboys joined Seguin in beginning league play on June 1. 1976.

Playing under manager Jimmy Smith, the Toros advanced to the league finals. With a regular season record of 29–48, Sequin placed second, finishing 17.5 games behind the Baton Rouge Cougars in the final East Division standings. However, the first place Baton Rouge franchise folded from the league on August 13, 1976, and Sequin replaced Baton Rouge in the three-team playoff bracket. In the playoffs, the Seguin Toros swept the Beeville Bees in two games to advance to the finals, where the Toros were swept by the champion Corpus Christi Seagulls in three games.

The Gulf States League changed names for the 1977 season, becoming the Lone Star League. Sequin did not field a franchise in the newly named league, as Beeville, Corpus Christi, Harlingen and Victoria continued play, joining the new Texas City Stars and McAllen Dusters franchises in Lone Star League play.The Lone Star League folded after the 1977 season.

Seguin, Texas has not hosted another minor league team.

== The ballpark ==
The 1976 Seguin Toros minor league team played home games at the Fairgrounds Ball Park. The Fairgrounds Ball Park in Seguin is still in use today by the Seguin River Monsters, a summer collegiate baseball team in the Texas Collegiate League, located at 950 South Austin Street, Seguin, Texas. The Fairgrounds Ball Park has since been renamed to Smokey Joe Williams Field in honor of Smokey Joe Williams who was considered one of the greatest pitchers of all time and born in Seguin.

== Year-by-year record ==
Year	Record	Finish	Manager	Playoffs/Notes
1976	29–48	2nd	Jimmy Smith	Defeated Beeville 2 games to 0 Finals: Lost 3 games to 0 to Corpus Christi

== Notable alumni ==
No Seguin Toros alumni advanced to the major leagues.
