= Earl Caldwell (baseball) =

American baseball player (1905–1981)

- Pitcher
- Born: April 9, 1905; Sparks, Texas, U.S.
- Died: September 15, 1981 (aged 76); Mission, Texas, U.S.
- Batted: Right Threw: Right

MLB debut
- September 8, 1928, for the Philadelphia Phillies

Last MLB appearance
- September 15, 1948, for the Boston Red Sox

MLB statistics
- Win–loss record: 33–43
- Earned run average: 4.69
- Strikeouts: 202

Teams
- Philadelphia Phillies (1928); St. Louis Browns (1935–1937); Chicago White Sox (1945–1948); Boston Red Sox (1948)

Earl Welton "Teach" Caldwell (April 9, 1905 – September 15, 1981) was an American professional baseball pitcher whose career saw him win more than 330 games over 29 seasons, 1926 to 1954, including 33 victories in Major League Baseball (MLB) as a member of the Philadelphia Phillies (1928), St. Louis Browns (1935–1937), Chicago White Sox (1945–1948) and Boston Red Sox (1948). Caldwell appeared in an even 200 games pitched in the majors, and in over 1,000 games overall.

Born in Sparks, Texas, Caldwell threw and batted right-handed, stood 6 feet 1 inch (1.85 m) tall and weighed 178 pounds (81 kg). After entering pro ball in the Class D Texas Association as a 21-year-old in 1926 with the Temple Surgeons, Caldwell made his MLB debut with the Philadelphia Phillies on September 8, 1928, and pitched a 4–0, six-hit shutout over the Boston Braves, but lost four games after that, and was let go at the end of the season. After spending seven years in minor league baseball, Caldwell was called up by the St. Louis Browns. He reappeared successfully on September 22, 1935, outdueling Schoolboy Rowe in a three-hit, 1–0 shutout over the American League leading Detroit Tigers. Caldwell ended with a 3–2 mark and a 3.68 ERA, but faded to a 7–16 with a 6.00 ERA in 1936 and was sent again to the minors.

In 1944, Caldwell helped the Milwaukee Brewers to clinch the American Association title. Caldwell compiled a 19–5 record, earning the most wins in the league and finishing with the highest winning percentage (.792). His fine season earned him another shot at the majors, where he won 13 games basically as reliever for the Chicago White Sox in 1945, at 40 years of age. He also led the AL in games finished (37) and had a 2.08 ERA in 902/3 innings pitched. The next three years he divided his playing time with Chicago and the Boston Red Sox, and pitched his final game on September 15, 1948. In an eight-season career, Caldwell posted a 33–43 record with a 4.69 ERA, 202 strikeouts, five shutouts, 18 complete games, 25 saves, and 5872/3 innings in 200 games pitched (49 as a starter).

Following his majors career, Caldwell twice led the Gulf Coast League in ERA with a 2.21 in 1951 and a 2.73 in 1952 while with the Harlingen Capitols. He retired from baseball in 1954, one year after leading the Evangeline League as pitcher–manager for the Lafayette Bulls with a 2.07 ERA at the age of 48. At the time of his retirement from baseball, he was pitching in the Big State League for the Corpus Christi Clippers when Mission Citrus Growers Inc. recalled him from a leave of absence to become the farm's general manager. At that time, he was the oldest active player in baseball.

Caldwell died from liver cancer in Mission, Texas, aged 76.
