= Schepps Palm Field =

Baseball venue in Corpus Christi, Texas, US

- Interactive map of Schepps Palm Field
- Full name: Schepps Palm Field
- Former names: Clippers Field (1954–1957); Giants Field (1958–1959)
- Location: Corpus Christi, Texas
- Coordinates: 27°47′4″N 97°26′19″W
- Owner: George Schepps
- Operator: George Schepps

Construction
- Opened: 1949
- Closed: 1959
- Demolished: August 1960

Tenants
- Corpus Christi Aces (Rio Grande Valley) (1949–1950); Corpus Christi Clippers (Big State League); Corpus Christi Giants (Texas League) (1958–1959)

Schepps Palm Field was a minor league baseball venue located in Corpus Christi, Texas. It was home to the short-lived Corpus Christi Clippers of the Big State League from 1954 to 1957, and the Corpus Christi Giants from 1958 to 1959. The field was challenging to play on due to the widening cracks and hard surface.

== Naming ==
The original name for the ballpark, Schepps Palm Field, was named after entrepreneur George Schepps. The Palm part was named for the palm trees, which is the only sustainable icon where the park once stood. New ownership brought a name-change to the team for the 1954 season, and thus the park was renamed Clippers Field. Then, after the team (and Big State League) folded after the 1957 season, the Oklahoma City franchise relocated to Corpus Christi, the team was named the Giants, and the park was renamed as Giants Field.

== Playing conditions ==
Unlike the more sophisticated Whataburger Field, Schepps Palm Field had no air conditioning to aid players during the oppressively hot summers in Texas. The field was not any better; the ground cracked, caused irregular bounces, and looked similar to a sandlot than a traditional ballpark.

== 1958 Texas League Champions ==
=== Regular season ===
In 1958, in their first season as the Corpus Christi Giants, the team had an average year. They finished third with a 77-75 record, good enough for 3rd place. They concluded the season 1/2 game ahead of the Austin Senators, 1/2 game behind the Houston Buffs, and 10 games behind the Fort Worth Cats.

=== Playoffs ===
In the playoffs, they played their first series (best-of seven) against the Houston Buffs and won 4 games to one. In the Texas League championship, they faced the Austin Senators and barely won going a full seven games to decide a winner.

== Location ==
The park used to exist between Old Brownsville Road, Highway 44, and Baldwin Blvd. Horton Automatics as well as a gas station, and a restaurant now took up residence as there is no trace of the ballfield, Schepps Palm Field. After the financially strapped Giants moved to Harlingen, Texas, following the 1959 season, the park was demolished in August 1960.

== Sources ==
- "Ghost Leagues: Minor League Baseball in South Texas," Noe Torres, c.2005
