= Gulf States League =

- Classification: Class A (1976)
- Sport: Minor League Baseball
- First season: 1976
- Folded: 1976
- Replaced by: Lone Star League (1977)
- President: Unknown (1976)
- No. of teams: 6
- Country: United States of America
- Most titles: 1 Corpus Christi Seagulls (1976)

The Gulf States League was a Class A level American minor baseball league that existed for one season — 1976 — and was based in the American states of Texas and Louisiana.

== History ==
Although its teams were not affiliated with any Major League Baseball farm systems, the Gulf States League was an "official" minor circuit and a member of the National Association of Professional Baseball Leagues. Established before the boom in minor and independent league baseball attendance that began in the 1980s, the Gulf States League did not survive after its maiden season. Instead, the league reorganized without any teams in Louisiana, and was renamed the Lone Star League for the 1977 season.

Six teams comprised the Gulf States League: the Baton Rouge Cougars, Beeville Bees, Corpus Christi Seagulls, Rio Grande Valley White Wings (representing Harlingen, Texas), Seguin Toros and Victoria Cowboys. Despite drawing the second-most fans in the league, the Baton Rouge franchise folded on August 13, 1976, and Corpus Christi won both the regular season and playoff championships.

Managers included Leo Mazzone of Corpus Christi, future pitching coach of the Atlanta Braves and Baltimore Orioles; former MLB catcher Matt Batts of Baton Rouge; and ex–MLB outfielder Ted Uhlaender, who was the playing skipper of the Rio Grande Valley White Wings.

== Cities represented ==
- Baton Rouge, Louisiana: Baton Rouge Cougars (1976)
- Beeville, Texas: Beeville Bees (1976)
- Corpus Christi, Texas: Corpus Christi Seagulls (1976)
- Harlingen, Texas: Rio Grande Valley White Wings (1976)
- Seguin, Texas: Seguin Toros (1976)
- Victoria, Texas: Victoria Cowboys (1976)

== Yearly standings ==
Team standings	W-L	GB	Managers
East Standings
Baton Rouge Cougars	43–27	—	Matt Batts
Seguin Toros	29–48	17½	Jimmy Smith
Beeville Bees	33–53	18	Bob Leach
West standings
Corpus Christi Seagulls	50–27	—	Leo Mazzone
Victoria Cowboys	43–35	7½	Ken Richardson
Rio Grande Valley White Wings	32–40	14½	Ted Uhlaender

Baton Rouge folded August 13
Playoff: Seguin 2 games, Beeville 0.
Finals: Corpus Christi 3 games, Seguin 0.
