= Leo Mazzone =

American baseball coach (born 1948)

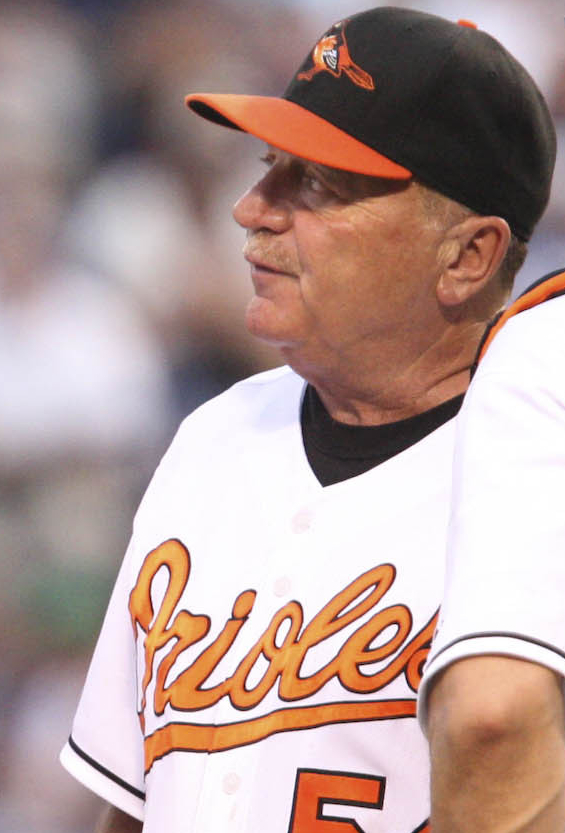
- Mazzone with the Baltimore Orioles in 2007
- Pitching coach
- Born: October 16, 1948 (age 77); Keyser, West Virginia, U.S.
- Stats at Baseball Reference

Teams
- As coach: Atlanta Braves (1990–2005); Baltimore Orioles (2006–2007)

Career highlights and awards
- World Series champion (1995); Braves Hall of Fame

Leo David Mazzone (born October 16, 1948) is an American former pitcher in minor league baseball and pitching coach in Major League Baseball. He worked with the Atlanta Braves' organization from 1979 to 2005 and was the pitching coach for the Baltimore Orioles from 2006 to 2007. He last served as the Special Pitching Advisor for the Furman University baseball program before it was shut down in 2020.

== Early life ==
Although Mazzone was born in West Virginia, his family lived on the other side of the Potomac River's north branch in Luke, Maryland. Growing up there, one of his friends was Sam Perlozzo of nearby Cumberland, Maryland, under whom Mazzone would eventually coach for the Baltimore Orioles. Mazzone was even the best man at Perlozzo's wedding.

== Playing career ==
A pitcher, Mazzone made his professional debut in 1967 with the Medford Giants, a class-A farm team of the San Francisco Giants. In all, he pitched seven seasons in the Giants organization, reaching as high as the Double-A Amarillo Giants, for whom he played four seasons from 1970 to 1973. He pitched the next three seasons in the Oakland Athletics chain, reaching Triple-A with the Tucson Toros in 1975. In 1976, he was a player-manager for the class-A Corpus Christi Seagulls. He became their full-time manager the following season.

== Coaching career ==
Mazzone was the hot-tempered manager for the Carolina League Kinston Eagles in 1978. It was the recommendation and contacts of Eagles owner Ray Kuhlman that proved instrumental in Atlanta deciding to take a chance on Mazzone in 1979.

Mazzone has earned a reputation as one of the best pitching coaches of the modern era, having molded Tom Glavine and John Smoltz into perennial All-Stars. Greg Maddux also enjoyed his best seasons under Mazzone. During his time in Atlanta, Mazzone developed and coached some of the best pitching rotations in baseball history. In 2005, ESPN ranked the 1998 (#1) and the 1993 (#4) Atlanta Braves pitching staffs as two of the Top 10 rotations of all time. This dominant pitching anchored the Braves' run of 14 consecutive division titles (1991-2005), 5 National League pennants (1991-1992, 1995-1996, 1999) and the 1995 World Series championship.

Between 1991 and 1998, three of his pitchers won a total of 6 Cy Young Awards:

- Tom Glavine - 1991 and 1998
- Greg Maddux - 1993, 1994, and 1995 (also won the award in 1992 with the Chicago Cubs)
- John Smoltz - 1996

Maddux, Glavine, and Smoltz have all been inducted into the National Baseball Hall of Fame. Over the years, a number of other pitchers joined the Braves and enjoyed some of their finest seasons under Mazzone only to regress after leaving.

Mazzone's "accidental trademark" is his rocking back and forth while sitting in the dugout. On television broadcasts of Braves games, the camera would often show him rocking back and forth during the game. Mazzone's pitching philosophies state that pitchers should throw more between starts (two sessions instead of one) and be able to throw strikes on the low and outside corner of the strike zone.

After the 2005 season Leo Mazzone took the Baltimore Orioles pitching coach job. On October 12, 2007, the Orioles fired Mazzone with one year left on his contract.

On August 30, 2016, Leo Mazzone was hired by Head Coach Brett Harker of the Furman University Baseball program as a Special Pitching advisor.

== Honors ==
He was inducted in the Kinston Professional Baseball Hall of Fame in 1993.

In his book The Baseball Economist, J.C. Bradbury titles a chapter, "How Good is Leo Mazzone?" Using statistical analysis, he analyzes whether Mazzone had a significant impact upon the pitchers that he coached. The sample is all pitchers who have pitched at least one year under Mazzone and one year under a different pitching coach. Bradbury found that Mazzone lowered the ERA of pitchers by an average of 0.64 points, and that after leaving Mazzone, pitchers' ERA increased by an average of 0.78 points. Bradbury believes that such an impact is deserving of Hall of Fame consideration.

ESPN.com lists him number one on the list of "Top 10 Assistant Coaches of All-Time".

On July 30, 2022, the Atlanta Braves inducted him into the franchise Hall of Fame.

== Post-coaching career ==
Currently, Mazzone works as a color commentator for Fox. He resides in upstate South Carolina.

Preceded by Bruce Dal Canton	Atlanta Braves pitching coach 1990–2005	Succeeded by Roger McDowell
Preceded by Ray Miller	Baltimore Orioles pitching coach 2006–2007	Succeeded by Rick Kranitz
