= Southwest Texas League =

- Classification: Class D (1910–1911); Independent (1936)
- Sport: Minor League Baseball
- First season: 1910
- Folded: 1911
- President: B.S. Dickinson (1910–1911)
- No. of teams: 6
- Country: United States of America
- Most titles: 1 Brownsville Brownies (1910); Beeville Orange Growers (1911)

The Southwest Texas League was a minor league baseball league that played in the 1910 and 1911 seasons. The Southwest Texas League played as a six–team Class D level league and consisted of teams based exclusively in Texas. The Brownsville Brownies and Beeville Orange Growers teams won the two league championships.

== History ==
The Southwest Texas League began play as a six–team Class D level minor league in the 1910 season, with all six franchises based in Texas. The league president was B.S. Dickinson. Charter members were the Bay City Rice Eaters from Bay City, Texas, Beeville Orange Growers from Beeville, Texas, Brownsville Brownies from Brownsville, Texas, Corpus Christi Pelicans from Corpus Christi, Texas, Laredo Bermudas from Laredo, Texas and Victoria Rosebuds from Victoria, Texas.

In their first season of league play, games began on April 21, 1910. The league was divided into half–seasons, with the Victoria Rosebuds winning the first half and the Brownsville Brownies winning the second half. The league had a total of five no–hit games in 1910. The first occurred on April 29, 1910, when Henry Trigg of Corpus Christi threw a no–hitter against the Brownsville Brownies in a 1–0 victory. On May 29, 1910, Si Platzer of Bay City threw a no–hitter against Corpus Christi, winning the game 2–0. On June 26, 1910, John Taff, pitching for Brownsville threw the league's third no–hitter of the season, defeating Corpus Christi 1–0. John Taff threw his second no–hitter of the season on July 14, 1910, defeating Beeville 5–0. In a losing effort, Desiderio Hernandez, pitching for Laredo threw the fifth league no–hitter of the season on July 30, 1910, losing to Corpus Christi 3–2.

Victoria, who won the first half pennant, also had the league's best overall record at 72–45. Brownsville, had the second best overall record at 68–47, winning the second half pennant. Both finished ahead of the third place Bay City Rice Eaters (59–56), followed by Laredo (54–61), Beeville (52–64) and Corpus Christi (42–74), who had been involved in four no–hit games in 1910. Victoria was led by a league leading 28 wins from pitcher Larry Gilbert. In the 1910 Finals, the Brownsville Brownies defeated the Victoria Rosebuds 4 games to 2.

In 1911, B.S. Dickinson continued as Southwest Texas League president and the league played what would be their final season. All six teams returned for the second season of league play During the 1911 season. On May 27, 1911, Will Wehrman, pitching for Bay City threw a no-hitter against the Laredo Bermudas in a 6–0 victory. The Corpus Christi Pelicans surrendered the franchise to the league on July 17, 1911 and the club eventually folded on August 13, 1911 with a 46–70 record. The Victoria Rosebuds disbanded on August 11, 1911 with a 54–59 record. With four teams finishing the regular season, the Bay City Rice Eaters won the first half pennant and Beeville won the second half title. Bay City had the best overall record with a 67–51 record, followed by Brownsville, who finished 2.0 games behind with a 64–52 overall record, Beeville (63–54) and Laredo (55–63).

Based on the split–season format, Bay City and Beeville were scheduled to play in the 1911 finals. It was reported that the league wanted to retrieve the 1910 championship trophy from Brownsville to reuse for the 1911 finals, but Brownsville refused to part with the trophy. The 1911 Finals Southwest Texas League were not held, as the Beeville Orange Growers were awarded the championship after Bay City refused to play in the finals. It was reported that Bay City was concerned about Beeville fan behavior based on earlier incidents. The league permanently folded after the 1911 season.

In 1936, a league named the Southwest Texas League formed as a four–team Independent League. Eagle Pass, Del Rio, Uvalde and Laredo fielded teams. No league standings or statistics are known.

== 1910–1911 Southwest Texas League teams ==
| Team name(s) | City represented | Ballpark | Year(s) active |
|---|---|---|---|
| Bay City Rice Eaters | Bay City, Texas | Tenth Street Park | 1910 to 1911 |
| Beeville Orange Growers | Beeville, Texas | The ballpark | 1910 to 1911 |
| Brownsville Brownies | Brownsville, Texas | Lions Park | 1910 to 1911 |
| Corpus Christi Pelicans | Corpus Christi, Texas | Unknown | 1910 to 1911 |
| Laredo Bermudas | Laredo, Texas | Laredo Ballpark | 1910 to 1911 |
| Victoria Rosebuds | Victoria, Texas | Cardinal Park | 1910 to 1911 |

== Standings & statistics ==
1910 Southwest Texas League

| Team standings | W | L | PCT | GB | Managers |
|---|---|---|---|---|---|
| Victoria Rosebuds | 72 | 45 | .615 | – | Jack Burke |
| Brownsville Brownies | 68 | 47 | .591 | 3 | S.H.Bell / Leo Hellman / Kerr Price |
| Bay City Rice Eaters | 59 | 56 | .513 | 12 | Ed Haralson / John Blakeney / Louis Hamilton |
| Laredo Bermudas | 54 | 61 | .470 | 17 | George Page / Tomlin |
| Beeville Orange Growers | 52 | 64 | .448 | 19½ | Trapper Longley / J.C. Woessner |
| Corpus Christi Pelicans | 42 | 74 | .362 | 29½ | Patrick Murphy / Billy Page |

Player statistics
| Player | Team | Stat | Tot | Player | Team | Stat | Tot |
|---|---|---|---|---|---|---|---|
| Jack Burke | Victoria | BA | .294 | Larry Gilbert | Victoria | W | 28 |
| Louis Hamilton | Bay City | Runs | 75 | Roy Morton | Brownsville | SO | 173 |
| Jack Burke | Victoria | Hits | 125 | Roy Morton | Brownsville | Pct | .850; 17-3 |
| James Sheffield | Victoria | SB | 94 | | | | |

1911 Southwest Texas League

| Team standings | W | L | PCT | GB | Managers |
|---|---|---|---|---|---|
| Bay City Rice Eaters | 67 | 51 | .568 | – | Louis Hamilton / Ed Haralson / J.H. Morehead |
| Brownsville Brownies | 64 | 52 | .552 | 2 | O.H. Boston / S.H. Bell |
| Beeville Orange Growers | 63 | 54 | .538 | 3½ | Ted Schultz / Billy Disch |
| Laredo Bermudas | 55 | 63 | .466 | 12 | John Blakeney / Lucky Wright |
| Victoria Rosebuds | 54 | 59 | .478 | NA | Hart McCormick / J. Linebaugh / Jack Burke |
| Corpus Christi Pelicans | 46 | 70 | .397 | NA | Henry Hunt / Ed Wicker |

Player statistics
| Player | Team | Stat | Tot | Player | Team | Stat | Tot |
|---|---|---|---|---|---|---|---|
| A.G. Knaupp | Victoria | BA | .289 | Ezequiel Ramos | Larado | W | 20 |
| George Harper | Corpus Christi | Runs | 66 | Buddy Napier | Brownsville | SO | 213 |
| Lou Vetter | Beeville | Hits | 121 | Raymond Stubbs | Beeville | Pct | .750; 15–5 |
| Harry Sweet | Bay City | HR | 9 | | | | |
