= Del Rio Cowboys =

The Del Rio Cowboys were a Longhorn League (1948) and Rio Grande Valley League (1949–1950) baseball team based in Del Rio, Texas, United States. Dick Midkiff and Sam Harshaney played for them.

In 1954, the Bryan Indians of the Big State League moved to Del Rio and finished the 1954 season as the Del Rio Indians. The team was 17–24 at the time of the move. They finished 53–93. The franchise folded after the season.
