= Cabaniss Field =

Baseball stadium in Corpus Christi, Texas, US

Coordinates: 27°42′25.4″N 97°25′48.8″W

- Interactive map of Cabaniss Field
- Full name: Cabaniss Field
- Location: 3062 Oso Drive; Corpus Christi, Texas; 78415
- Owner: Corpus Christi ISD
- Operator: Corpus Christi ISD
- Capacity: 1,500 (approx)
- Surface: AstroTurf

Construction
- Opened: 1940s (approx)

Tenants
- Corpus Christi Seagulls (Gulf States League) (1976); Corpus Christi Seagulls (Lone Star League) (1977); Corpus Christi Barracudas (Texas–Louisiana League) (1994–1995)

Cabaniss Field is the baseball stadium for the varsity baseball team of the Corpus Christi Independent School District.

The school district allowed the stadium to be used starting in 1976 for minor league baseball, but did not allow the team to sell beer, so the team left after the 1977 season. When minor league baseball moved back to Corpus Christi in 2005, a new park – Whataburger Field – was built downtown for the new team.
