= Leo Najo =

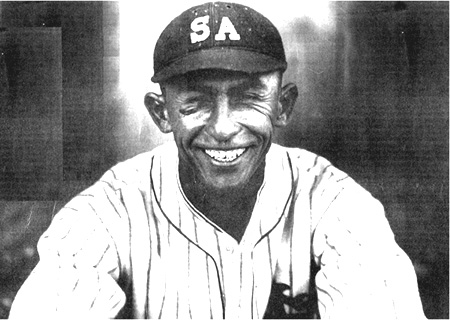
- Leonardo "Leo Najo" Alanís in San Antonio Bears team uniform, circa 1925.
- Outfielder
- Born: 17 February 1899; Doctor Coss, Nuevo León, Mexico
- Died: 25 April 1978 (aged 79); Mission, Texas, U.S.

Member of the Mexican Professional

Baseball Hall of Fame
- Induction: 1939

Leonardo "Leo Najo" Alanís (17 February 1899 – 25 April 1978) was one of the first Mexican-born players to play professional baseball in the United States, debuting in 1924 with the San Antonio Bears of the Class A Texas League. After early success in the minor leagues, he was drafted by the major league Chicago White Sox in 1925. Although a leg injury, and possibly racial prejudice, stifled his major league career, Najo moved on to enjoy a lengthy and productive career both in the U.S. minor leagues and in the Mexican League. In 1939, he became the first player selected to the Mexican Professional Baseball Hall of Fame, known as Salón de la Fama del Beisbol Profesional de México. In 2001, Minor League Baseball named Leo Najo's 1932 Tulsa Oilers team as one of the top 100 minor league teams of all time, in part because of his contributions."

== Early life and career ==
Leo Najo was born Leonardo Alanís on February 17, 1899 in the small town of La Lajilla, located in the municipality of Doctor Coss in Nuevo León, Mexico. When Najo was 10, his mother moved the family to the nearby town of Mission, Texas, where she purchased a small tavern and operated it successfully for many years afterward. Najo lived in Mission for the rest of his life. The family's financial stability allowed the youth to spend much of his time playing the relatively new game of baseball, which was very popular along the Texas-Mexico border at the start of the 20th century.

In the early 1920s, Najo and several other young men in Mission formed a town semi-pro team, the Mission 30-30s, named after the Winchester Model 1894 rifle, which was popularly known as the 30-30 rifle. The 30-30s became a baseball institution in Mission, existing until the mid-1960s. A number of famous South Texans besides Najo played on the 30-30s team, including future Dallas Cowboys coach Tom Landry and future U.S. Congressman Kika de la Garza.

Because playing semi-pro ball in Mission was only bringing in about $6 per week, Najo also played for other South Texas teams, including the Milmo Bank team of Laredo, Texas. Najo also played with some of the very earliest organized teams in Mexico, including the Cuauhtemoc Brewery team of Monterrey in 1922. The Cuauhtemocs are viewed by baseball historians as an important early Mexican franchise and a forerunner of the highly successful Sultanes de Monterrey in the modern Mexican League.

It was during Najo's early, semi-pro playing days that he began using "Najo" as his playing name. Relatives believe the name derived from the Spanish word for rabbit, "conejo", given to Najo by fans because of his fast base running.

Because of his natural speed and catching ability, Najo mostly played center field, although he often played the other outfield positions and, rarely, the infield. In addition to being an above-average hitter (.321 lifetime batting average), Najo excelled at drawing walks and stealing bases, and he was often the team's leadoff hitter. In his twenties, he stood 5-foot-9 and weighed 144 pounds.

== From the semi-pros to the pros ==
During the early 1920s, Najo's Milmo Bank team occasionally traveled to San Antonio, Texas, for games against semi-pro teams there. During one of these visits, Najo was "discovered" by a scout with the San Antonio Bears of the Class A Texas League. He was signed in December 1923 and played his first pro game on April 16, 1924, at San Antonio's League Park, leading off and playing right field for the Bears against the Galveston Sand Crabs. By his participation in that game, he became one of the first Mexicans to play U.S. professional baseball. Baseball historians also believe Najo was the first Mexican to play in the Texas League, which was established in 1888.

Later in 1924, forced to reduce their roster, the San Antonio Bears "lent" Najo to the Class D Tyler Trojans, where he led the team to the championship of the East Texas League, finishing third in the league in batting and earning a .992 fielding average. Najo received recognition for his fast base running and acrobatic catches in the outfield.

Najo played almost the entire 1925 season on loan from San Antonio to the Class C Okmulgee Drillers of the Western Association. He played in 142 games, mostly at center field, hit 34 home runs, made 213 hits, and compiled a .381 batting average. After the season, league president J. Warren Seabough told the Chicago Daily Tribune, "Leo Najo ... is one of the greatest players of all time in the Western Association."

== Drafted by the Chicago White Sox ==
Following Najo's success with the Okmulgee Drillers, the Chicago White Sox drafted him in the winter of 1925, and thus he became, most historians agree, the first Mexican player ever taken by a major league team. A November 8, 1925 Washington Post article refers to Najo as “one of the greatest baseball players of all time.”

He appeared in a number of spring training games for the White Sox in 1926, seven years before Mel Almada officially became the first Mexican player to earn a regular roster spot in the U.S. major leagues. According to newspaper accounts of the day, Judge Kenesaw Mountain Landis, baseball’s first commissioner, watched Najo play in exhibition games in 1926. Decades later, in 1973, another baseball commissioner, Bowie Kuhn, attended Najo's induction into the Salón de la Fama del Beisbol Profesional de México in Monterrey.

Najo's spring training statistics indicate that he played well enough to make the major league team. However, on the final day of spring training, Najo was released to the San Antonio Bears. The Chicago Daily Tribune reported, "The Sox squad was cut down by one today when Najo ... was shipped to the San Antonio club to which he has been released outright. There are others tonight awaiting the signal to move."

Although the exact reason for his dismissal remains a mystery, Najo's family suspects that the decision was due, at least in part, to racial prejudice among the major league players and team officials. The White Sox attempted to portray Najo, who was of dark complexion and spoke limited English, as a Native American ("Chief Najo") due to prevailing racism against Mexicans. Najo family members say that, although he remained upbeat and dedicated to his love of baseball, racial prejudice did adversely affect his career.

== Suspicious injury ==
In releasing Najo to San Antonio, Chicago retained the right to call him back up to the majors as the season progressed. It appears likely that Najo would have gotten another shot with the White Sox as long as he continued to play well in San Antonio ... and remained healthy.

On July 7, 1926, Najo was seriously injured during a game with the Houston Buffaloes when another outfielder, Ping Bodie, collided with him while both players were running full speed to catch a fly ball. The burly Bodie, who normally played first base and had only been with the team for a month, ran over the much smaller Najo and landed on top of him. The result was that Najo's leg was severely broken midway between the knee and the ankle, ending his season and also ending his chances of returning to the major leagues.

San Antonio's Spanish-language newspaper, La Prensa, reported, "Najo's collision with Bodie, plus the fact that Bodie landed on top of him, caused the popular Mexican player to break his left leg below the knee. Najo had to be helped off the field on the shoulders of other players.... In reality, this is a death blow to San Antonio's chances of winning the championship of the Texas League. Not only was Najo one of the best outfielders in the league, but he was a consistently excellent hitter with a batting average above .300. In addition, his incredible speed made him a top base stealer."

Some Najo admirers say that Najo's injury may have been the result of a conspiracy to damage his baseball career. These conspiracy theorists say that Najo was actually only days away from rejoining the Chicago White Sox and that Bodie deliberately plowed into Najo due to jealousy, racism, or because somebody paid him to injure Najo. They point out that Bodie had recently joined the team, that he was unaccustomed to playing in the outfield, that he was much taller and heavier than Najo, and that he left the team shortly after injuring Najo.

== Najo's career resumes after injury ==
Despite the serious setback to his career, Najo returned to action in 1927 with the San Antonio Bears. He batted around .300 and had a fielding average of .960 or better in two seasons with San Antonio (1927, 1928), two seasons with the Omaha Crickets / Packers of the Western League (1929, 1930), and a season split between Omaha and San Antonio in 1931.

On May 27, 1928, playing at League Park in San Antonio against the Beaumont Exporters, Najo set a Minor League record for most outfield putouts (12) in one game. Although the record has since been broken, it stood for many years.

Unofficial Leo Najo Minor League statistics, compiled by Noe Torres
Year	Team	Games	A-B	H	B.A.	P.O.	F.A.
1924	S.A.	26	96	20	.208	27	--
1924	Tyler	108	392	150	.382	242	.992
1925	Okmulgee	142	559	213	.381	444	.977
1925	S.A.	2		2	--	9	--
1926	S.A.	82	290	90	.310	183	.976
1927	S.A.	122	390	115	.295	265	.976
1928	S.A.	158	581	161	.277	423	.967
1929	Omaha	120	421	133	.316	315	.979
1930	Omaha	129	471	168	.335	341	.975
1931	Omaha	92	334	119	.356	--	--
1931	S.A.	39	124	32	.266	34	1.000
1932	S.A.	33	129	31	.250	33	1.000
1932	Tulsa	113	427	138	.323	--	--
1938	McAllen	137	367	130	.354	229	.976

Prior to the start of the 1932 season, Najo was traded to the Tulsa Oilers of the Western League. Baseball historians believe that Najo's contributions to this historic Tulsa team are an important reason it having been named one of Minor League Baseball's 100 best teams of all time. Baseball historians Bill Weiss and Marshall Wright wrote, "The 1932 Tulsa Oilers were a one-season wonder, entering and exiting the Western League in a short few months. However, despite their brief stay, the team left a lasting legacy, finishing with the top winning percentage (.671) in league history.... Center fielder Leo Najo, who hit .323, was one of the first Mexican players in Organized Baseball. Najo, a native La Lajilla, Nuevo Leon, had a career average of.321 in 1,318 games, mostly with San Antonio and Omaha."

The peak of Najo's playing career coincided with America’s Great Depression, during which the industry of professional baseball, like most others, fell on hard times. Members of his family believe that the Depression was a significant factor in keeping Najo from attempting a return to the major leagues.

Although expected to return to Tulsa for the 1933 season, Najo had a salary dispute with the team and left minor league baseball at age 33. He returned to Mission, Texas to look after his family's business interests, including the tavern handed down to him by his mother, along with several rental properties. The Depression was at its height, and Najo finally grew tired of being away from home for long periods and of playing for very small salaries.

== Later life and death ==
After being out of pro baseball for six years, Najo, at age 39, staged a short-lived "comeback" in 1938 with the McAllen Packers of the Class D level Texas Valley League. He played in 137 games, collecting 130 hits, a .354 batting average, and a .976 fielding average. He followed that up with two seasons as a player-manager in the Mexican League, with the Alijadores de Tampico of Tampico in 1939 and the Diablos Rojos del México of Mexico City in 1940.

In 1939, Najo was the first player elected to the Mexican Professional Baseball Hall of Fame (Salón de la Fama del Beisbol Profesional de México), although he was not officially inducted until 1973, after an actual Hall of Fame building was constructed in Monterrey, Mexico. An exhibit about Najo in the Hall of Fame features a bronze statue in the "Temple of Baseball’s Immortals."

After his career as a pro player ended, Najo used his regional fame to promote the game of baseball throughout South Texas and Northern Mexico. He continued playing, managing, coaching, and umpiring in semi-pro and youth leagues for decades. As a manager, even well into his fifties, he often inserted himself into games as a pinch hitter. Many players that he coached went on to become successful professional baseball players and coaches.

After a lengthy battle with cancer, Najo died on April 25, 1978, at the age of 79, following complications resulting from gall bladder surgery. In his honor, the street in Mission where he lived most of his life was renamed "Leo Najo Street," and the Mission High School baseball stadium was also named for him.

Every October since Najo's death, a large group of fans and admirers has hosted a "Leo Najo Day" in Mission's Community Center. The annual gathering draws hundreds of baseball aficionados and features displays and programs about the history of baseball in South Texas.

== Books ==
- Torres, Noe. Baseball's First Mexican-American Star: The Amazing Story of Leo Najo. Llumina Press, 2006. ISBN 1-59526-579-1.
- Torres, Noe. Ghost Leagues: A History of Minor League Baseball in South Texas. Llumina Press, 2005. ISBN 1-59526-086-2.
- King, David. San Antonio at Bat: Professional Baseball in the Alamo City. Texas A&M University Press, 2004. ISBN 978-1-58544-376-5.
