= Charlie Engle (baseball) =

American baseball player (1903–1983)

- Infielder
- Born: August 27, 1903; New York City, U.S.
- Died: October 12, 1983 (aged 80); San Antonio, Texas, U.S.

MLB debut
- September 14, 1925, for the Philadelphia Athletics

Last MLB appearance
- September 27, 1930, for the Pittsburgh Pirates

MLB statistics
- Batting average: .251
- Home runs: 0
- Runs batted in: 15
- Stats at Baseball Reference

Teams
- Philadelphia Athletics (1925–1926); Pittsburgh Pirates (1930)

Charlie August "Cholly" Engle (August 27, 1903 – October 12, 1983) was an American professional baseball infielder. He played shortstop in Major League Baseball (MLB) for the Philadelphia Athletics during the 1925 and 1926 seasons and the Pittsburgh Pirates during the 1930 season. Engle made his major league debut in a game against the New York Yankees on September 14, 1925. This was the only game he played in the season and he did not get at bat. In the 1926 season he played in 19 games with a batting average of .105. He played in the minor leagues for the Memphis Chickasaws and had a batting average of .302 in 1929. He was subsequently drafted into the Pirates in the 1930 major league season.

While playing with the Pirates, Engle held several field positions, playing first as third baseman, then shortstop, and finishing the season as second baseman. He had a fielding percentage of .937, achieving a high of .975 when he was the third baseman for the Pirates. Engle had 67 putouts and 110 assists during his major league career. His batting average in the majors was .251 and he scored 41 runs.

He returned to the minors and spent eight years in the Texas League, three in West Texas–New Mexico League, and one in the Evangeline League before World War II. During the war, Engle ran a team in the San Antonio Service Baseball League called the Charlie Engle All-Stars. While playing his last season in the minors in 1946 for the Henderson Oilers, Engle was also manager for the Wisconsin Rapids and he managed several more minor league teams after the end of his professional playing career. His last manager position for the minor leagues was in 1950 with the Robstown Rebels. Over the course of his minor league career, Engle was at bat over 6,000 times and hit 11 home runs. His batting average in the minors was .258 and he had a fielding percentage of .945.
