= Fabian Kowalik =

American baseball player (1908–1954)

- Pitcher
- Born: April 22, 1908; Falls City, Texas, U.S.
- Died: August 14, 1954 (aged 46); Karnes City, Texas, U.S.
- Batted: Right Threw: Right

MLB debut
- September 4, 1932, for the Chicago White Sox

Last MLB appearance
- September 27, 1936, for the Boston Bees

MLB statistics
- Win–loss record: 3–11
- Earned run average: 5.43
- Strikeouts: 42
- Stats at Baseball Reference

Teams
- Chicago White Sox (1932); Chicago Cubs (1935–1936); Philadelphia Phillies (1936); Boston Bees (1936)

Fabian Lorenz Kowalik (April 22, 1908 – August 14, 1954) was an American professional baseball pitcher. He played in Major League Baseball from 1932 to 1936 for the Chicago Cubs, Chicago White Sox, Philadelphia Phillies, and Boston Bees.

Kowalik pitched for the Cubs in the 1935 World Series, despite only playing 20 regular season games. His sole appearance came in Game 2, pitching 4 1/3 innings and giving up one unearned run, as well as scoring a single in the 7th inning.

After getting married in February 1936, Kowalik arrived at spring training for the 1936 season out of shape. After recording an 0–2 record in six games, he was traded to the Philadelphia Phillies on May 21. His season did not improve — Kowalik posted an 1–5 record and an ERA of 5.38 in twenty-two games. Placed on waivers, Kowalik was picked up by the Boston Bees on September 6 and played his last MLB game against his old team, the Phillies, on September 27. Replacing Hal Lee in left field, Kowalik hit an RBI single in a 4–3 loss. Kowalik played in the minors from 1937 to 1940, retiring due to persistent arm injuries and lack of form.

Born in Falls City, Texas, Kowalik died in Karnes City, Texas, on August 14, 1954, aged 46.
