= Tex Covington =

American baseball player (1887–1931)

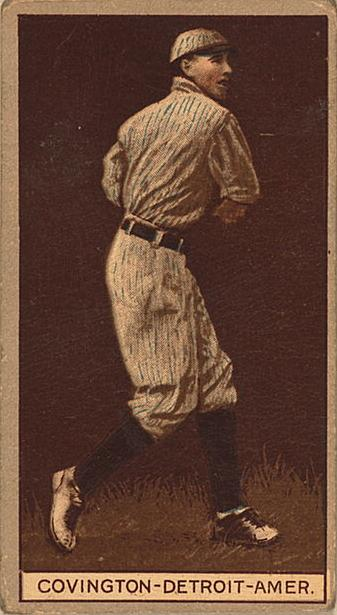
- Pitcher
- Born: March 19, 1887; Henryville, Tennessee, U.S.
- Died: December 10, 1931 (aged 44); Denison, Texas, U.S.
- Batted: Left Threw: Right

MLB debut
- April 25, 1911, for the Detroit Tigers

Last MLB appearance
- September 20, 1912, for the Detroit Tigers

MLB statistics
- Win–loss record: 10-5
- Earned run average: 4.10
- Strikeouts: 48
- Stats at Baseball Reference

Teams
- Detroit Tigers (1911–1912)

William Wilkes Covington (March 19, 1887 – December 10, 1931) was an American pitcher in Major League Baseball. He played for the Detroit Tigers. Appearing in 31 games, he posted a 4.10 ERA. He pitched 147 innings between 1911 and 1912. He made no errors in 1911, but three in 1912, greatly affected his career fielding percentage (.929).

His brother Sam also played in the major leagues.
