= Dick Midkiff =

American baseball player (1914–1956)

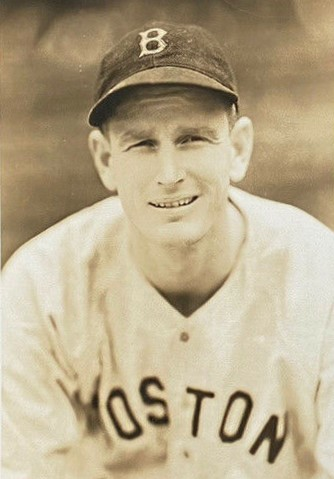
- Pitcher
- Born: September 28, 1914; Gonzales, Texas, U.S.
- Died: October 30, 1956 (aged 42); Temple, Texas, U.S.
- Batted: Right Threw: Right

MLB debut
- April 24, 1938, for the Boston Red Sox

Last MLB appearance
- September 13, 1938, for the Boston Red Sox

MLB statistics
- Win–loss record: 1–1
- Earned run average: 4.93
- Strikeouts: 10
- Stats at Baseball Reference

Teams
- Boston Red Sox (1938)

Richard James Midkiff (September 9, 1914 – October 30, 1956) was an American pitcher in Major League Baseball. He pitched in thirteen games for the Boston Red Sox in 1938, receiving two decisions (one win and one loss). He also pitched for Boston's American Association affiliate, the Minneapolis Millers, that season and was a teammate of Ted Williams there.

In the mid-1950s, Midkiff contracted squamous cell carcinoma of the tongue which later spread to his neck and carotid artery. He died at the age of 42 on October 30, 1956, from a massive hemorrhage of his right carotid artery as a result of his cancer.
