= Johnny Rizzo =

American baseball player (1912–1977)

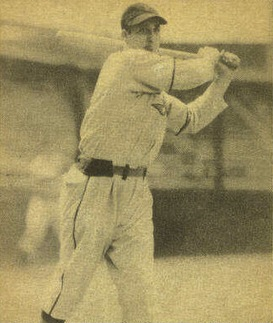
- Outfielder
- Born: July 30, 1912; Houston, Texas, U.S.
- Died: December 4, 1977 (aged 65); Houston, Texas, U.S.
- Batted: Right Threw: Right

MLB debut
- April 19, 1938, for the Pittsburgh Pirates

Last MLB appearance
- September 25, 1942, for the Brooklyn Dodgers

MLB statistics
- Batting average: .270
- Home runs: 61
- Runs batted in: 289
- Stats at Baseball Reference

Teams
- Pittsburgh Pirates (1938–1940); Cincinnati Reds (1940); Philadelphia Phillies (1940–1941); Brooklyn Dodgers (1942)

John Costa Rizzo (July 30, 1912 – December 4, 1977) was an American outfielder in Major League Baseball from 1938 to 1942. Rizzo set the Pittsburgh Pirates record for most home runs in a season, with 23 in his rookie year of 1938. Up until 2026, Rizzo held the Pirates record for most RBIs in a game, with nine until Ryan O’Hearn had 10.

In 1938, Rizzo's rookie season with the Pirates, he ended the season with a .301 batting average and 111 runs batted in. His 167 hits including 31 doubles, nine triples and 23 home runs. Rizzo set a Pirate record for home runs that lasted until Ralph Kiner tied Rizzo with 23 in 1946 and took sole possession with 51 in the 1947 season. No other rookie would break a team single-season home run record until Pete Alonso of the New York Mets did so in 2019. Rizzo held the Pirate rookie record with Kiner until Jason Bay hit 26 in his first season in 2004. The Rookie of the Year Award had not yet been established, but Rizzo finished sixth in the balloting for National League Most Valuable Player in his inaugural season, an award won by Ernie Lombardi the Cincinnati Reds. Rizzo was third in the National League in runs batted in, fifth in home runs, sixth in runs scored (with 97) and ninth in hits.

Rizzo's batting went into a slump in the 1939 season, which he finished with a .261 average, six home runs and 55 RBI. That season's bright spot was in the second game of a doubleheader against the St. Louis Cardinals on May 30, 1939, when he hit nine RBI in a game with two home runs, leading the Pirates to a 14–8 win to salvage a split of the twin bill. Rizzo went five-for-six in the game, helping to singlehandedly erase a seven-run Cardinals lead. The nine RBI by Rizzo set a Pirates single game team record that has not been broken until Ryan O'Hearn had a ten RBI game on July 7, 2026.

Rizzo continued his slump into the 1940 season, hitting for a .261 average in nine games with the Pirates. He was traded by the Pirates to the Cincinnati Reds on May 8, 1940, in exchange for outfielder Vince DiMaggio. Rizzo perked up with the Reds, hitting for a .282 average and four home runs in 31 games with the team. In turn, the Reds traded Rizzo to the Philadelphia Phillies on June 15, 1940, in exchange for outfielder Morrie Arnovich. Rizzo continued his improvement, hitting .292 with 20 home runs in 103 games over the remainder of the season with the Phillies. Between the three teams, Rizzo finished the 1940 season with a .283 batting average, 24 home runs and 72 RBI. Rizzo finished in third place in the National League for home runs that season. He received three points in voting for the NL's Most Valuable Player that season, enough to tie him for 29th place in the balloting.

Rizzo played the entire 1941 season for the Phillies, finishing with a .217 average and four home runs in 99 games. After the season, he was purchased by the Brooklyn Dodgers on December 10, 1941, from Philadelphia.

He played 78 games for the Dodgers in the 1942 season, finishing with a .230 batting average and four home runs in 99 games. He played the final game of his Major League career that year on September 25.

In 557 games over five seasons, Rizzo posted a .270 batting average (497-for-1842) with 268 runs, 61 home runs, 289 RBIs and 200 bases on balls. Defensively, he recorded a .961 fielding percentage playing at all three outfield positions and several games at third base.

Rizzo enlisted as a Seaman in the United States Navy in December 1942, days before a ban placed by President Roosevelt on such enlistments.
