= La Plaza Mall =

La Plaza
- Location: McAllen, Texas, United States
- Opened: 1976; 50 years ago
- Developer: Melvin Simon & Associates
- Manager: Simon Property Group
- Owner: Simon Property Group
- Num. of stores: 183
- Num. of anchor tenants: 5
- Floor area: 1,300,000 square feet (120,000 m^{2})
- Floors: 1 (2 in MADRAG, Zara, Express, Dillard's, H&M, and Macy's home store, and main Macy’s)
- Website: www.simon.com/mall/la-plaza

La Plaza (formerly La Plaza Mall) is a regional shopping mall located in McAllen, Texas, at the intersection of Interstate 2 (Expressway 83) and 10th Street. It has 1,300,000 square feet (120,000 m^{2}) of gross leasable area and features 184 specialty stores, many of which are flagship stores, and restaurants. The mall is one of the highest-grossing operated by Simon, and the largest mall in South Texas.

An original tenant of the mall was a Woolworth dime store, the second in McAllen, which closed in 1997. 1998 expansion brought a larger Dillard's store and more retail space. The old Dillard's space was subsequently gutted to make way for more stores. Another original tenant was a Jones & Jones department store, which was sold to Foley's in 2000 and again to Macy's in 2006. Sears was also an original anchor to the mall but was demolished in 2016 to make way for a massive expansion that added more retail space. The famous stores that are in La Plaza Mall are Macy's, Dilards, Primark (just opened), H&M and, Coach.

== Anchors ==
- Dillard's
- JCPenney
- Macy's
- Macy's Home and Children's Store

== Former anchors ==
- Foley's - closed 2006. Replaced by Macy's.
- Jones & Jones - closed 2000. Replaced by Foley's.
- Sears - closed November 2015. Replaced by an expansion of La Plaza Mall, opened in late 2017.
