= Sam Harshany =

American baseball player (1910–2001)

- Catcher
- Born: April 24, 1910; Madison, Illinois, U.S.
- Died: February 1, 2001 (aged 90); San Antonio, Texas, U.S.
- Batted: Right Threw: Right

MLB debut
- September 28, 1937, for the St. Louis Browns

Last MLB appearance
- May 3, 1940, for the St. Louis Browns

MLB statistics
- Batting average: .238
- Home runs: 0
- Runs batted in: 15
- Stats at Baseball Reference

Teams
- St. Louis Browns (1937–40)

Samuel Harshany (April 24, 1910 – February 1, 2001) was an American Major League Baseball catcher. He played all or part of four seasons, from 1937 until 1940, for the St. Louis Browns. After his playing career, Harshany managed several years in the minors in the late 1940s and early 1950s.

His surname has also been spelled Harshaney.

== Sources ==
- Career statistics from Baseball Reference · Baseball Reference (Minors) · Retrosheet · Baseball Almanac
