= Laredo Apaches =

- Logo

Information
- League: Rio Grande Valley League (1949–1950); Gulf Coast League (1951–1953); Texas–Louisiana League (1995)
- Location: Laredo, Texas
- Ballpark: Veterans Field
- Founded: 1949; 1995
- Colors: White, red
- Mascot: Apache

The Laredo Apaches were a minor league baseball team from Laredo, Texas that existed in two different incarnations: 1949–1953 and again in 1995.

== History ==
The original Apaches were one of the six charter franchises of the Class D Rio Grande Valley League in 1949, having been preceded in Laredo by the Laredo Bermudas of the Southwest Texas League (1910–1911) and the Laredo Oilers, who played as members of the Gulf Coast League in 1926 and Texas Valley League in 1927. In 1949, Laredo finished 80–60 in second place, and were eliminated by Brownsville in the playoffs. The following year, the Apaches moved into a new stadium, West Martin Field (now Veterans Field) and finished second again, edged out for the pennant by a single game by Harlingen; again, the Apaches were beaten in the semifinals, this time by Corpus Christi Seahawks.

Losing two of their eight clubs mid-season, the RGVL folded after the 1950 campaign, and four of the loop's teams moved to the Class B Gulf Coast League (not to be confused with the current circuit of that name). In 1951, Laredo finished fourth but were eliminated by Corpus Christi Seahawks in the post-season; in 1952, the Apaches slipped to fifth and missed the playoffs. In their final campaign in 1953, led by batting champ Juan Senties (.379), Laredo edged back up to fourth, but were again dumped in the playoffs, this time by Galveston. Both the Apaches and the GCL would fold at the end of the season.

=== Owls and the new Apaches ===
Professional baseball would not return to Laredo until 1985, when the Mexican League club Tecolotes de Nuevo Laredo became the Tecolotes de los Dos Laredos, playing home games on both sides of the Rio Grande. In 1995, however, the Owls suddenly had competition, as the San Antonio Tejanos of the independent Texas–Louisiana League transferred to Laredo. But the new Apaches wouldn't last long; sporting the league's worst record at 17–32, and drawing only about 700 fans per game at the now-aged Veterans Field, the league decided to fold the franchise (as well as the Pueblo Bighorns) mid-season.

The Tecolotes would continue to play in Laredo until 2004; in 2011, the city council voted to build a new ballpark, Uni-Trade Stadium, and the American Association granted an expansion team, the Laredo Lemurs, in time for the 2012 season. The Lemurs withdrew from the AA before the 2017 season, but the Mexican League announced that the Rojos del Águila de Veracruz club would become a new version of the Owls, and would play some of their home games at Uni-Trade Stadium, starting in 2018.
