= Harlingen, Texas minor league baseball history =

Harlingen, Texas minor league baseball teams
- 1931–2014; (1931, 1938, 1950–1953, 1960–1961, 1976–1977, 1994–2014); Harlingen, Texas

Minor league affiliations
- Class: Class B (1931, 1938, 1951–1953); Class C (1950); Class AA (1960-1961); Class A (1976-1977); Independent (1994–2014)
- League: Rio Grande Valley League (1931); Texas Valley League (1938); Rio Grande Valley League (1950); Gulf Coast League (1951–1953); Big State League (1954–1955); Texas League (1960–1961); Gulf States League (1976); Lone Star League (1977); Texas–Louisiana League (1994–2001); Central Baseball League (2002–2003); United League Baseball (2006–2010); North American League (2011–2012); United League Baseball (2013–2014)

Major league affiliations
- Team: Detroit Tigers (1938); San Francisco Giants (1960–1961)

Minor league titles
- League titles (4): 1938; 1952; 2000; 2014
- Conference titles (2): 1950; 1960
- Wild card berths (3): 1951; 1952; 1953

Team data
- Name: Harlingen Ladds (1931); Harlingen Hubs (1938); Harlingen Capitals (1950–1955); Rio Grande Valley Giants (1960–1961); Rio Grande Valley White Wings (1976); Harlingen Suns (1977); Rio Grande Valley WhiteWings (1994–2014)
- Ballpark: Harlingen Field

Minor league baseball teams were based in Harlingen, Texas in various seasons between 1931 and 2014. Harlingen teams played as members of the 1931 Rio Grande Valley League, 1938 Texas Valley League, 1950 Rio Grande Valley League, the Gulf Coast League from 1951 to 1953, Big State League in 1954 and 1955, Texas League in 1960 and 1961, 1976 Gulf States League and 1977 Lone Star League , winning four league championships. The Rio Grande Valley WhiteWings played in various leagues between 1994 and 2014. The Harlingen minor league home ballpark was Harlingen Field.

Harlingen teams were a minor league affiliate of the Detroit Tigers in 1938 and San Francisco Giants in 1960 and 1961.

== History ==
Minor league baseball began in Harlingen, Texas in 1931. The Harlingen Ladds played briefly as members of the 1931 Rio Grande Valley League and placed third in their first season of play. On July 29, 1931, the Ladds had a record of 43–49, playing under manager Paul Trammel, when the Rio Grande Valley League folded.

Harlingen returned to minor league play in 1938, winning a championship. The Harlingen Hubs became members of the 1938 Texas Valley League and were a minor league affiliate of the Detroit Tigers. The Hubbs finished second in the regular season in 1938, but swept through the playoffs undefeated to capture the Texas Valley League Championship, while playing under manager Jake Atz. The league folded after the 1938 season.

The Harlingen Capitals were members of the Class D level Rio Grande Valley League in 1950 and Class B level Gulf Coast League from 1951 to 1953. They were founding members of the Gulf Coast League, along with the Brownsville Charros, Corpus Christi Aces, Galveston White Caps, Lake Charles Lakers, Laredo Apaches, Port Arthur Seahawks and Texas City Texans. When the Gulf Coast League folded after the 1953 season, Harlingen joined the Big State League, playing in the 1954 and 1955 seasons.

The Rio Grande Valley Giants, played in the Class AA level Texas League in 1960 and 1961 as an affiliate of the San Francisco Giants. Baseball Hall of Fame inductee Gaylord Perry played for the Giants in 1960. The franchise moved to Victoria, Texas on June 10, 1961, to complete the season. In 1976, the Rio Grande Valley White Wings played in the Gulf States League and the Harlingen Suns played in the 1977 Lone Star League, both leagues folded after one season. Later Rio Grande Valley White Wings teams played in independent professional leagues through 2015.

== The ballpark ==
Beginning in 1950, Harlingen minor league teams were noted to have played home games at Harlingen Field. Opening as Lon C. Hill Field, the ballpark was also called Giants Field. Harlingen Field is still in use today and most recently was home to the Independent professional Rio Grande Valley WhiteWings. The ballpark address is North O Street & Fair Park Boulevard, Harlingen, Texas.

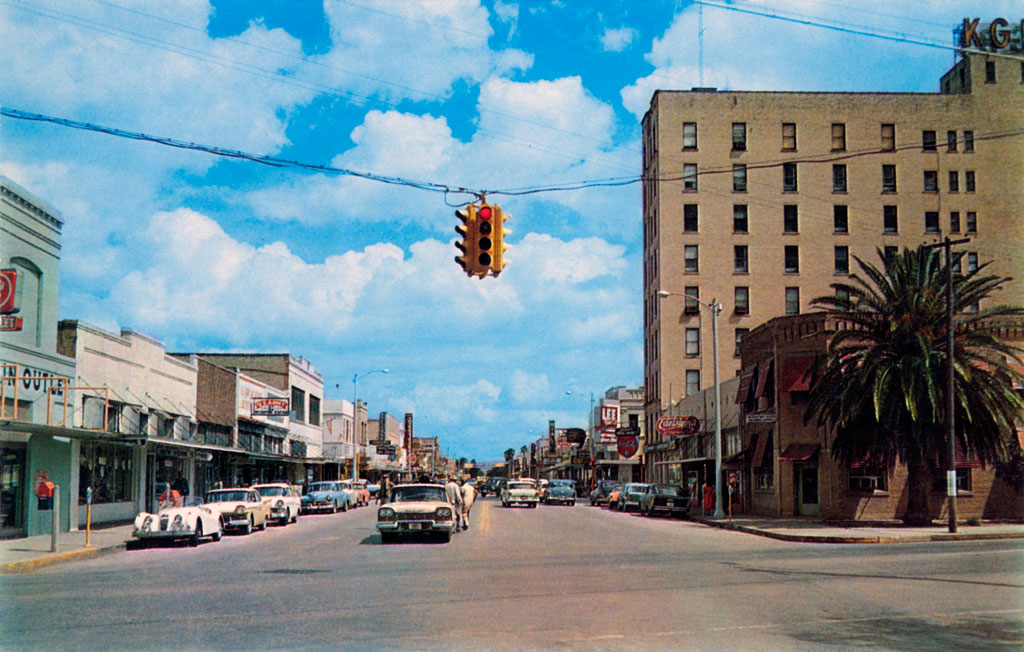
(1957) Jackson Street. Harlingen, Texas.

== Year–by–year records ==
Year	Record	Finish	Manager	Playoffs
1931	43–49	3rd	Paul Trammel	No playoffs held
1938	84–53	2nd	Jake Atz	League champions
1950	86–62	1st	Sam Harshaney	Lost League Finals
1951	86–68	2nd	Sam Harshaney	Lost in 1st round
1952	80–73	2nd	Bob Hamric	League champions
1953	77–69	3rd	Bob Hamric	Lost in 1st round
1954	53–94	7th	Sam Harshaney	Did not qualify
1955	65–79	5th	Ford Garrison	Did not qualify
1960	85–59	1st	Ray Murray	Lost in 1st round
1961	69–71	4th	Ray Murray	Team moved June 10
1976	32–40	4th	Ted Uhlaender	Did not qualify
1977	40–38	2nd	Paul Thomas	No playoffs held

== Notable alumni ==
- Gaylord Perry (1960) Inducted Baseball Hall of Fame, 1991
- Jake Atz (1938, MGR)
- Bobby Bolin (1960)
- Earl Caldwell (1951-1952)
- Ford Garrison (1955)
- Sam Harshaney (1950-1951)
- Ron Herbel (1960)
- Chuck Hiller (1960)
- Manny Mota (1960) MLB All-Star
- John Orsino (1960)
- Dee Phillips (1938)
- Jose Tartabull (1961)
- Ted Uhlaender (1976, MGR)

== See also ==
- Harlingen Capitals players
- Harlingen Hubs players
