= Brownsville Charros =

- 1910–1953; (1910-1911, 1928, 1938, 1949-1953); Brownsville, Texas

Minor league affiliations
- Previous classes: B (1951-1953); C (1950); D (1910-1911, 1928, 1938, 1949
- League: Gulf Coast League (1951–1953)
- Previous leagues: Rio Grande Valley League (1949–1950); Texas Valley League (1928, 1938); Southwest Texas League (1910–1911)

Minor league titles
- League titles: 1910, 1951

Team data
- Previous names: Brownsville Charros (1938, 1949–1953); Brownsville (1928); Brownsville Brownies (1910–1911)
- Previous parks: Lions Park

The Brownsville Charros were a minor league baseball team, based in Brownsville, Texas. The team played as the Brownsville Brownies from 1910 to 1911 in the Southwest Texas League before shutting down. They were revived in 1928 and then became the Charros in 1938 in the Texas Valley League. The team returned again in 1939 as part of the Rio Grande Valley League and moved to the Gulf Coast League in 1951.

A new team by the same name began in 2014 as part of the United League Baseball. The team finished its season on August 15, 2014, with its last game on the road against the Fort Worth Cats. The team was managed by former Major League Baseball player Ozzie Canseco.
