= Corpus Christi Clippers =

- 1910–1959; (1910–1911, 1926–1928, 1931, 1938, 1949–1959); Corpus Christi, Texas

Minor league affiliations
- Class: Class D (1910–1911, 1926–1928, 1931, 1938, 1949–1950); Class B (1951–1957); Class AA (1958–1959)
- League: Southwest Texas League (1910–1911); Gulf Coast League (1926); Texas Valley League (1927–1928); Rio Grande Valley League (1931); Texas Valley League (1938); Rio Grande Valley League (1949–1950); Gulf Coast League (1951–1953); Big State League (1954–1957); Texas League (1958–1959)

Major league affiliations
- Team: St. Louis Browns (1938); Milwaukee Braves (1954–1956); Pittsburgh Pirates (1957); San Francisco Giants (1958–1959)

Minor league titles
- League titles (3): 1927; 1955; 1958

Team data
- Name: Corpus Christi Pelicans (1910–1911); Corpus Christi Seahawks (1926–1928, 1931); Corpus Christi Spudders (1938); Corpus Christi Aces (1949–1953); Corpus Christi Clippers (1954–1957); Corpus Christi Giants (1958–1959)
- Ballpark: Kleberg Park (1926–1927); League Park (1931, 1938); Schepps Palm Field (1949–1959)

The Corpus Christi Clippers was a primary name of the minor league baseball teams based in Corpus Christi, Texas. Between 1910 and 1959 Corpus Christi teams played as members of the Southwest Texas League (1910–1911), Gulf Coast League (1926), Texas Valley League (1927–1928), Rio Grande Valley League (1931), Texas Valley League (1938), Rio Grande Valley League (1949–1950), Gulf Coast League (1951–1953), Big State League (1954–1957), Rio Grande Valley League (1949–1950) and Texas League (1958–1959).

Corpus Christi played as minor league affiliates of the St. Louis Browns in 1938, Milwaukee Braves from 1954 to 1956, Pittsburgh Pirates in 1957 and San Francisco Giants from 1958 to 1959.

The Corpus Christi Clippers and Corpus Christi Aces teams preceded the 1976 Corpus Christi Seagulls and today's Corpus Christi Hooks of the Texas League.

== History ==
Early Corpus Christi teams played in various leagues under differing monikers. The first minor league team based in Corpus Christi was the 1910 Corpus Christi Pelicans, who played as charter members of the Southwest Texas League in 1910 and 1911. The Corpus Christi Seahawks were members of the Gulf Coast League in 1926, Texas Valley League in 1927 and 1928 and Rio Grande Valley League in 1931. The Corpus Christi Spudders played in the 1938 Texas Valley League.

The 1927 Corpus Christi Seahawks won the 1927 Texas Valley League championship. The Seahawks were managed by Jim Payton in the Class D level league. The Seahawks finished 1st in the regular season standings with a 63–56 record in the four–team league. Corpus Christi then defeated the Laredo Oilers 3 games to 0 in the finals.

The Corpus Christi Aces played in the Class D level Rio Grande Valley League in 1949 and 1950. The Aces joined the Class B level Gulf Coast League from 1951 to 1953, before changing their moniker to "Clippers" for the 1954 season. Texas businessman, George Schepps, was the owner of both the Aces and Clippers.

The Corpus Christi Clippers were affiliates of the Milwaukee Braves (1954–1956) and Pittsburgh Pirates (1957). In their four seasons of play, the Corpus Christi Clippers finished with records of 87–60, 93–48, 83–57 and 69–58 (1954–1957). The Clippers captured the 1955 Big State League Championship and made the Big State Finals the other three seasons. The Clippers had home attendance totals of 97,255; 102,788; 112,625 and 56,871 in their four seasons. The Big State League permanently folded after the 1957 season.

In 1958, the Oklahoma City Indians of the Class AA Texas League moved to Corpus Christi, Texas. The new Corpus Christi franchise became a minor league affiliate of the San Francisco Giants and began play in 1958 as the Corpus Christi Giants.

The 1958 Corpus Christi Giants won the Texas League Championship. The Giants finished the regular season with a 77–75 record. They were 3rd in the Texas League under Manager Ray Murray. In the 1958 Texas League Playoffs, Corpus Christi defeated the Houston Buffalos 4 games to 1. In the Finals, the Corpus Christi Giants defeated the Austin Senators 4 games to 1 to capture the championship. Playing at Schepps Palms, Corpus Christi had season attendance of 87,774, an average of 1,155 per game.

Baseball Hall of Fame member Gaylord Perry played for the 1959 Corpus Christi Giants. Perry was 10–11 with a 4.05 ERA at age 20.

In 1959, the Corpus Christi Giants finished 66–79. They placed 6th in the Texas League, playing under manager Ray Murray. Corpus Christi had season attendance of 61,501, an average of 848. After the season, Corpus Christi relocated to Harlingen, Texas and became the Rio Grande Valley Giants.

Corpus Christi next hosted minor league baseball when the 1976 Corpus Christi Seagulls began play as members of the Class A level Gulf Coast League.

== The ballparks ==
The Corpus Christi Seahawks hosted 1926 and 1927 home minor league games at Kleberg Park. The ballpark was named for its builder and owner Richard M. Kleberg.

In 1931 and 1938, Corpus Christi played home games at League Park.

Corpus Christi teams played at Schepps Palm Field from 1949 to 1959. Named after owner George Schepps, the ballpark was torn down in 1960 after the departure of the Corpus Christi Giants. Schepps Palm Field was located near Old Brownsville Road, Highway 44 and Baldwin Boulevard. The approximate address of the site today is 4242 Baldwin Boulevard, Corpus Christi, Texas 78405.

== Notable alumni ==
- Gaylord Perry (1959) Inducted Baseball Hall of Fame, 1991
- Kyle Rote (1951) Inducted College Football Hall of Fame, 1964
- Ernie Bowman (1959)
- Earl Caldwell (1954)
- Ed Charles (1955)
- Charlie Dees (1959)
- Eddie Fisher (1958)
- John Fitzgerald (1959)
- Bill Froats (1958)
- Frank Funk (1958)
- Rudy Hernandez (1958)
- Joe Koppe (1952)
- Dick Lemay (1959)
- Don Leppert (1955) MLB All-Star
- Ray Murray (1958–1959, MGR)
- Stan Palys (1959)
- Al Papai (1958)
- Leo Posada (1955–1956)
- Eric Rodin (1958-1959)
- Connie Ryan (1955) MLB All-Star
- Sibby Sisti (1956)
- Bert Thiel (1959)
- Verle Tiefenthaler (1959)
- Jay Van Noy (1958)
- Johnny Weekly (1959)
- Spider Wilhelm (1958)
- Neil Wilson (1959)
- Roy Wright (1959)

== See also ==
- Corpus Christi Aces players
- Corpus Christi Clippers players
- Corpus Christi Giants players
- Corpus Christi Pelicans players
- Corpus Christi Seahawks players
- Corpus Christi Spudders players
