= College of the Holy Cross =

Private college in Worcester, Massachusetts, US

- Latin: Collegium Sanctae Crucis
- Motto: In hoc signo vinces (Latin)
- Type: Private liberal arts college
- Established: June 18, 1843; 183 years ago
- Founder: Benedict Joseph Fenwick
- Religious affiliation: Catholic (Jesuit)
- Academic affiliations: NAICU; ACCU; AJCU; WRC; HECCMA; OG; AG
- Endowment: $1.21 billion (2025)
- President: Vincent Rougeau
- Faculty: 365 (2024)
- Undergraduates: 3,256 (2024)
- Location: Worcester, Massachusetts, U.S. 42°14′21″N 71°48′30″W
- Campus: Suburban, 174 acres (70 ha)
- Colors: Purple and White
- Nickname: Crusaders
- Sporting affiliations: NCAA Division I –: Patriot League; Atlantic Hockey America; Hockey East; EARC
- Website: www.holycross.edu

The College of the Holy Cross (known simply as Holy Cross) is a private, Jesuit, liberal arts college in Worcester, Massachusetts, United States. Established in 1843 by Benedict Joseph Fenwick under the auspices of the Society of Jesus, Holy Cross was the first Catholic college in New England and is among the oldest Catholic institutions of higher education in the United States.

Holy Cross is a residential, undergraduate college with approximately 3,000 students. Students choose from 64 academic programs, including interdisciplinary and self-designed majors in liberal arts disciplines. The college's 174-acre (70-hectare) campus is situated on a hill overlooking the Blackstone River and Worcester. It has one of the largest financial endowments of any liberal arts college in the United States, and is one of the academically competitive Hidden Ivies. In 1986, Holy Cross joined the Patriot League, where its athletic teams compete as the Crusaders in NCAA Division I.

Notable graduates of Holy Cross include recipients of Emmy, Grammy, Academy, and Tony awards; 5 Rhodes Scholars, 5 Marshall Scholars, 6 Truman Scholars, Goldwater Scholars and Watson Fellows; Pulitzer Prize winners, a Nobel Prize laureate, (Note: Joseph E. Murray, a 1940 graduate of Holy Cross, won the 1990 Nobel Prize in Physiology or Medicine with E. Donnall Thomas for performing the world's first organ transplant.) U.S. senators, (Note: U.S. Senator Peter Welch (Vermont) and former U.S. Senator Bob Casey Jr. (Pennsylvania) graduated from Holy Cross in 1969 and 1982, respectively.) and Olympic athletes. Other notable alumni include Anthony Fauci, Director of the National Institute of Allergy and Infectious Diseases, and U.S. Supreme Court justice Clarence Thomas. The college is a top producer of Fulbright scholars, having graduated 182 grantees.

== History ==
=== Founding period, 1830–1843 ===
The College of the Holy Cross was established on June 18, 1843, as the first Catholic college, and the first Jesuit college, in New England. The college's founder, Boston bishop Benedict Joseph Fenwick, laid its first cornerstone (Note: The cornerstone contained a commemorative facsimile of Daniel Webster's dedication speech for the Bunker Hill Monument (which had taken place four days earlier), images of Webster and U.S. President John Tyler, and a Latin document including the signatures of Tyler, Massachusetts governor Marcus Morton, Thomas F. Mulledy, and all priests, superintendeats, and carpenters present.) on June 21, 1843, with twelve priests, "a large concourse of the citizens of Boston and several distinguished strangers," and parishioners from the Diocese of Worcester in attendance. Fenwick gave the college the name of his cathedral church in Boston's South End, the Cathedral of the Holy Cross, and modeled it after the English division of the Colleges of St Omer, Bruges and Liège, founded in 1593 as an seminary for Catholic youth in the Society of Jesus wanting "to escape heretical education in England." On the day of the cornerstone ceremony, Fenwick delivered an opening prayer in Latin:

In the faith of Jesus Christ we lay this first stone on this foundation in the name of the Father and of the Son and of the Holy Spirit, that true faith may flourish here, and the fear of God, and fraternal affection; and may this place be devoted to invoking and praising the name of our Lord Jesus Christ, Who, with the Father and the Holy Spirit, lives and reigns, one God, forever and ever.

— Fenwick's invocation, translated by historian Anthony Kuzniewski

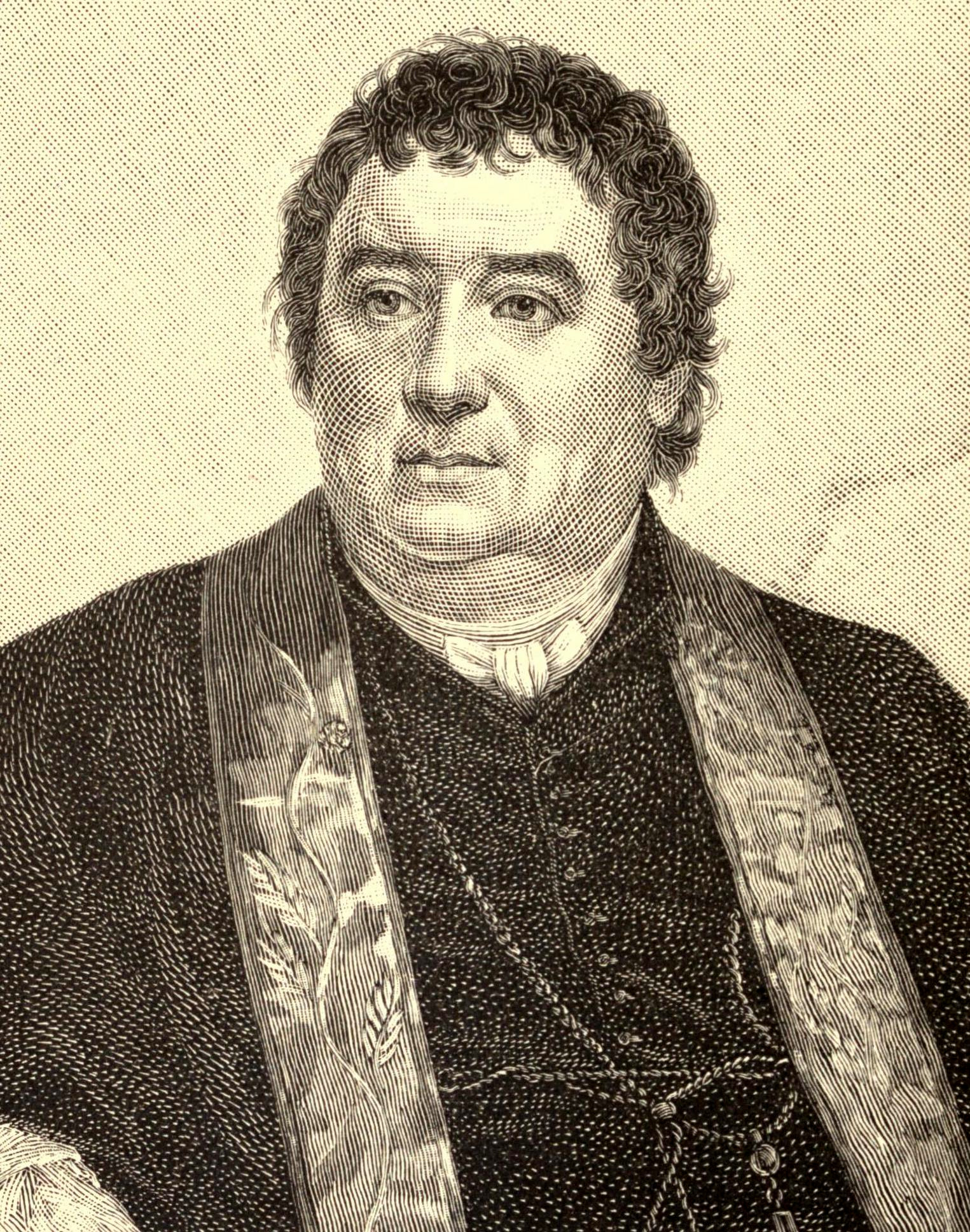
Benedict Joseph Fenwick, the founder of Holy Cross

Holy Cross was founded partially as a response to growing nativist sentiment against Catholic immigrants to Boston which had culminated in the Ursuline Convent riots, in which a convent of Ursuline nuns was burned down by an anti-Catholic mob. By 1830, the founding of a college and seminary became Fenwick's highest priority to satisfy the need for an educational institution to serve Catholic immigrant youth. A new influx of immigrants after 1830, consisting mostly of Catholic Irish Americans, intensified the need for a Jesuit educational institution. In April of 1831, Fenwick purchased property adjacent to his Boston cathedral for "a College in miniature" and, in 1833, said that he intended to open a college the following year, though local Jesuits refused to sponsor the school in 1835, after which Fenwick considered moving the college to Benedicta, Maine, but later abandoned the idea.

In the fall of 1842, Fenwick chose Worcester, Massachusetts, as the ideal location. The site Fenwick desired, Mount Saint James, was originally occupied by a Catholic boarding school run by Fr. James Fitton, so he purchased the school and 22 acres of land adjacent to the site. In October 1842, he wrote to his brother, George Fenwick:

Next May I shall lay the foundation of a splendid College in Worcester. I have bought 50 acres of land for that purpose. It is to be modelled after your new college [building] in Geo-Town, but prodigiously improved. . . . Will not this be a bold undertaking? Nevertheless I will try it.

In March of 1843, Fenwick petitioned the Society of Jesus for their approval in establishing an institution in Worcester, and they sent Fr. Thomas F. Mulledy to prepare a report regarding Fenwick's proposal. Mulledy's favorable report secured the Society's approval, which finally arrived in August of that year. With construction already having begun, Holy Cross became the third college sponsored by the Maryland Province of the Society of Jesus, after Georgetown College and the St. John's Literary Institution.

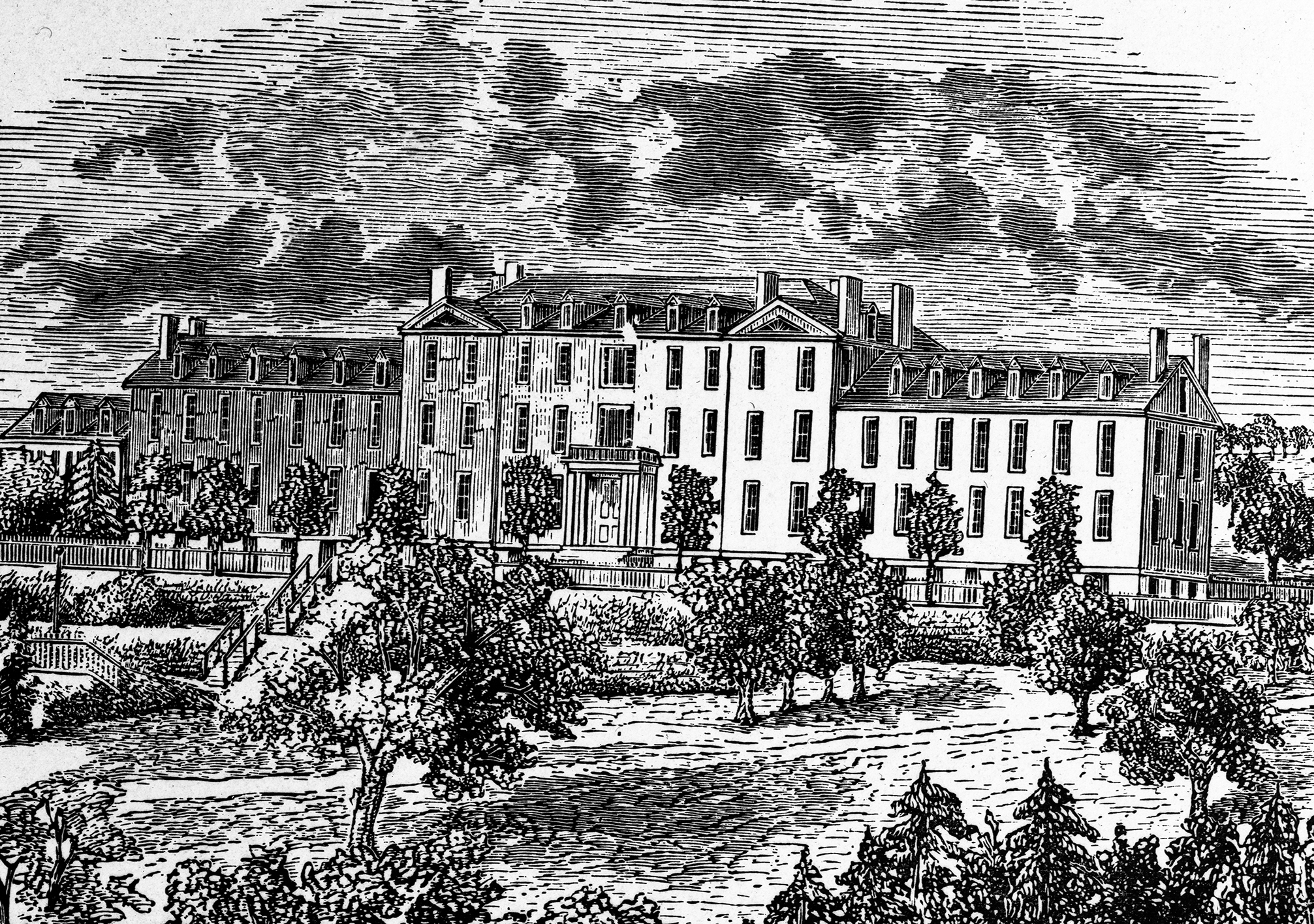
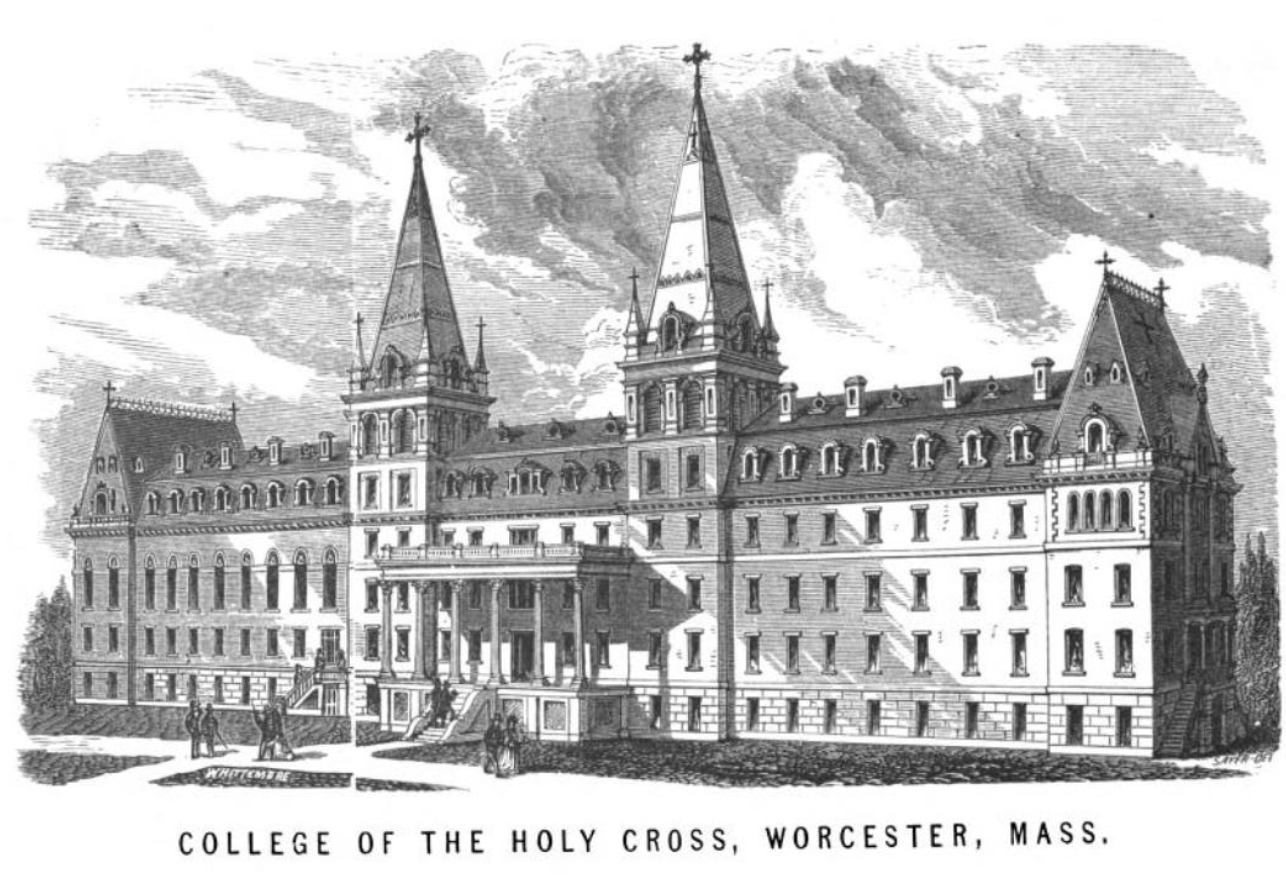
Fenwick Hall, named after Benedict Joseph Fenwick, was one of Holy Cross' inaugural structures. The building's cornerstone was laid on June 21, 1843

=== Beginnings, 1843–1900 ===
- College of the Holy Cross
- U.S. National Register of Historic Places
- Location within Massachusetts
- Location: Fenwick and O'Kane Halls, surrounding landscaping
- Area: 2.6 acres (1.1 ha)
- Built: 1843
- Architects: Lamb, Capt. Edward, et al.
- Architectural style: Classical Revival, Gothic, Second Empire
- MPS: Worcester MRA
- NRHP reference No.: 80000491
- Added to NRHP: March 5, 1980

Holy Cross opened enrollment on November 1, 1843, with Mulledy, who formerly served as president of Georgetown University, as the college's first rector and president. By January 1844, the college consisted of eighteen students, four priests, three lay teachers, three Jesuit brothers, two Jesuit candidates, and five lay employees, with enrollment increasing to 26 at the end of the first academic year. The college's main building, later named Fenwick Hall, was completed on January 13, 1844. An early financial crisis was averted when the Boston philanthropist Andrew Carney provided the college's first major donation of $1,000 (equivalent to $34,553 in 2025) in the hopes of promoting "pure and undefiled religion."

By the spring of 1846, enrollment reached 94 students. Because the college had yet to be granted a charter from the state, Fenwick signed the property of the college to the Presidents and Directors of Georgetown on August 6, 1846. The signing was his last public act; Fenwick died the next day on August 7 and was buried in Holy Cross' cemetery.

In 1845, Mulledy was succeeded as president by James A. Ryder, the rector of Georgetown College, whose administration was marked by tension with Jesuit authorities in Rome over the discipline of its religious faculty. Ryder was succeeded by John Early in 1848, after which tensions with Rome were mended, and the faculty began to gradually diversify with "scholastics"—unordained teachers—after 1846. They included Pennsylvania representative Samuel Lilly, who taught classics, arithmetic, and French at Holy Cross from 1845 to 1849; Joseph O'Callaghan, who joined in 1847 as a scholastic mathematics and French teacher, later becoming head of the library and a prefect; and Peter J. Blenkinsop, who worked as the college's treasurer before later assuming the presidency in 1854.

The college's early curriculum was organized into three courses—commercial, professional, and ecclesiastical—which all focused on the Jesuit Ratio Studiorum and had increasing degrees of Latin, Greek, philosophy, mathematics, science, and modern languages. From 1843 to 1861, the average age of students fluctuated from 14 to 16 years old. About 13 percent, or 523, of the college's students from 1843 and 1900 entered the priesthood. The first class baccalaureate class graduated in 1849, led by the valedictorian James Augustine Healy, who was of mixed-race descent. But because the college had not yet obtained a state charter, degrees were conferred in Georgetown's name. Two efforts to petition the Massachusetts House of Representatives for a charter in 1849 failed, largely due to the prevalence of anti-Catholic bias among state legislators.

Fenwick Hall, the school's main building, was completely destroyed by fire in 1852. Funds were raised to rebuild the college, and in 1853 it opened for the second time.

After repeated denials, a charter was finally granted on March 24, 1865, by Governor John Albion Andrew.

=== Modern history ===
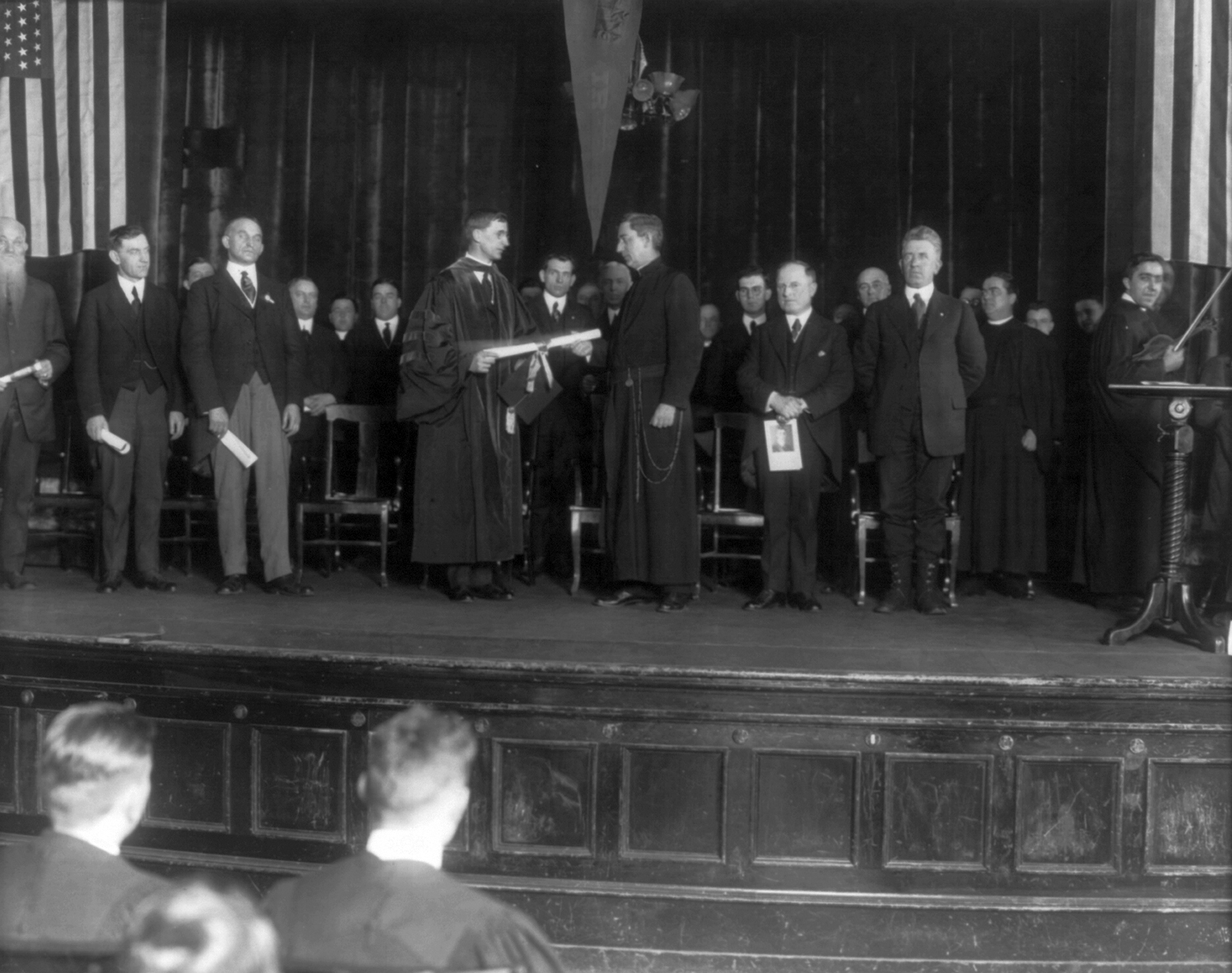
Éamon de Valera, President of Ireland, was conferred an honorary degree in 1920

During World War II, College of the Holy Cross was one of 131 colleges and universities that took part in the V-12 Navy College Training Program which offered students a path to a Navy commission.

In 1998, Holy Cross initiated an eight-year capital campaign, "Lift High the Cross", with a three-year quiet period. The campaign for Holy Cross ended in fiscal 2006 with $216.3 million raised, surpassing its original goal of $175 million. The funds allowed Holy Cross to establish an additional 12 new faculty positions, along with more than 75 newly endowed scholarships for students. During the campaign, the college's endowment grew to more than $544 million.

On July 1, 2000, Michael C. McFarland became the president of the college. In 2011, Philip L. Boroughs, the Vice President for Mission and Ministry at Georgetown University, was named McFarland's successor. In 2021, he was succeeded by Vincent D. Rougeau, dean of the Boston College Law School. Rougeau is the first lay and first black president in the history of the college.

In early 2018, the college began publicly exploring the possibility of changing its "Crusader" mascot and associated imagery. The college's leadership ultimately decided to keep the mascot, distinguishing its use of the nickname from the historical associations with the Crusades.

In 2019, the college ended its need-blind admissions policy.

== Campus ==
Map of the College of the Holy Cross campus Academic instruction Administration and services Arts venues Housing and dining Open spaces Sports and recreation College of the Holy Cross boundary

Fenwick Hall

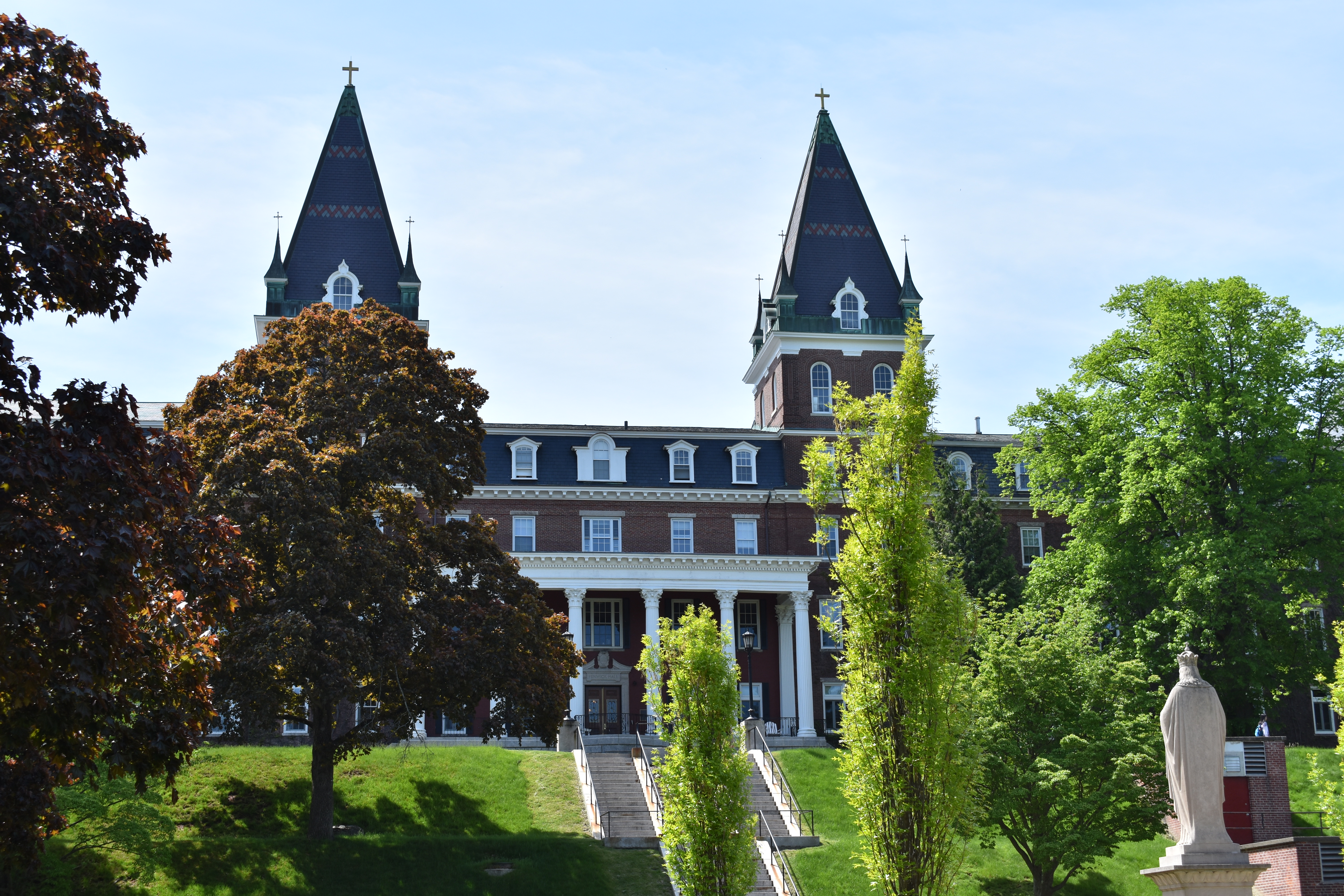
Main façade

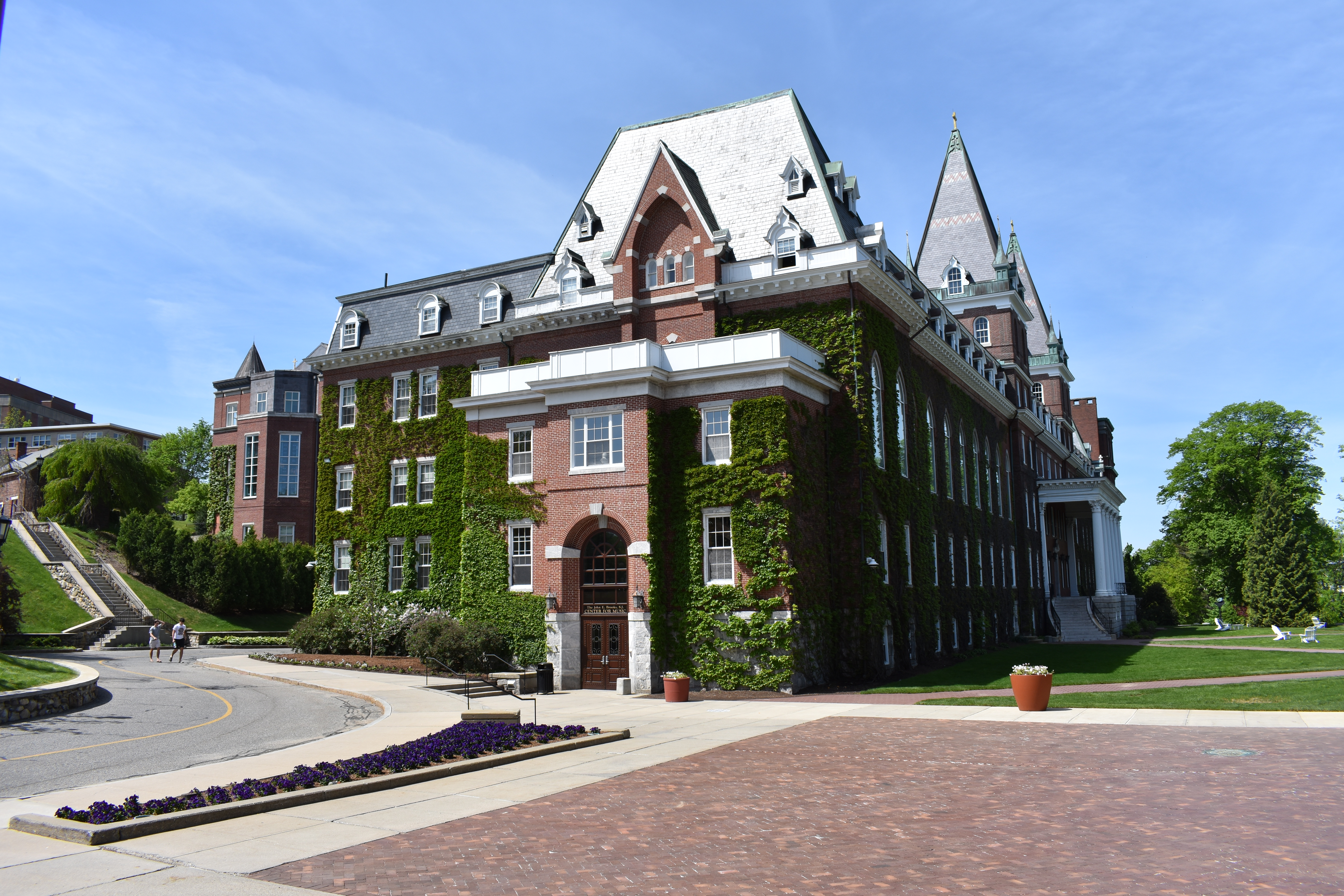
Right wing

Fenwick Hall, named for the college's founder, is Holy Cross's flagship building

Holy Cross's 174-acre (70 ha) campus is located on one of the seven hills overlooking Worcester, Massachusetts, approximately 44 miles (71 km) west of Boston. It is situated on a hill known as Mount Saint James. The campus is a registered arboretum noted for its landscape design, with buildings representing architectural styles ranging from classical to modern.

The college began in 1843 with 52 acres (21 ha) of land, a wooden building, and a partly completed brick structure. Fenwick Hall's main structure was built that year and its east wing in 1846; a fire in 1852 severely damaged the main portion, which was subsequently reconstructed. The building, originally known simply as the College Building, was completed on January 13, 1844, at a cost of $19,000 by Bishop Fenwick, and its cupola was crowned by a 6-foot (1.8 m) gilt cross. O'Kane Hall was constructed between 1891 and 1895 as an addition to the growing complex. The Fenwick–O'Kane complex was named to the National Register of Historic Places in 1980; the complex has Victorian, Victorian Gothic, Second Empire, Classical Revival, Romanesque Revival, and Renaissance Revival architectural elements.

"Holy Cross College" depicted in 1906

Much of the early 20th-century campus was designed by the Boston architecture firm Maginnis & Walsh, which designed every major Holy Cross building erected between 1904 and 1954. The firm's projects included Alumni, Beaven, Brooks, Carlin, Kimball and Wheeler halls, Dinand Library, St. Joseph Memorial Chapel, the Linden Lane gates, and the fence along College Street. Later construction introduced contemporary buildings on the hillside, including the 50,000-square-foot (4,600 m^{2}) Smith Hall, designed by Graham Gund's firm to connect the campus's upper and lower elevations. In 2023, Holy Cross and Sasaki Associates completed the first phase of a new campus master plan.

The campus consists of 38 buildings as of 2026. Thirteen residence halls house approximately 90 percent of students; six of them are grouped along an upper-campus corridor known as Easy Street, while others are distributed around the central and lower portions of the campus. Athletic facilities are located at both ends of the campus, with Fitton Field and the baseball and softball facilities on lower campus and the Luth Athletic Complex, soccer stadium, and several practice fields on upper campus.

Aerial view of the College of the Holy Cross campus on Mount Saint James

=== Lower Campus ===
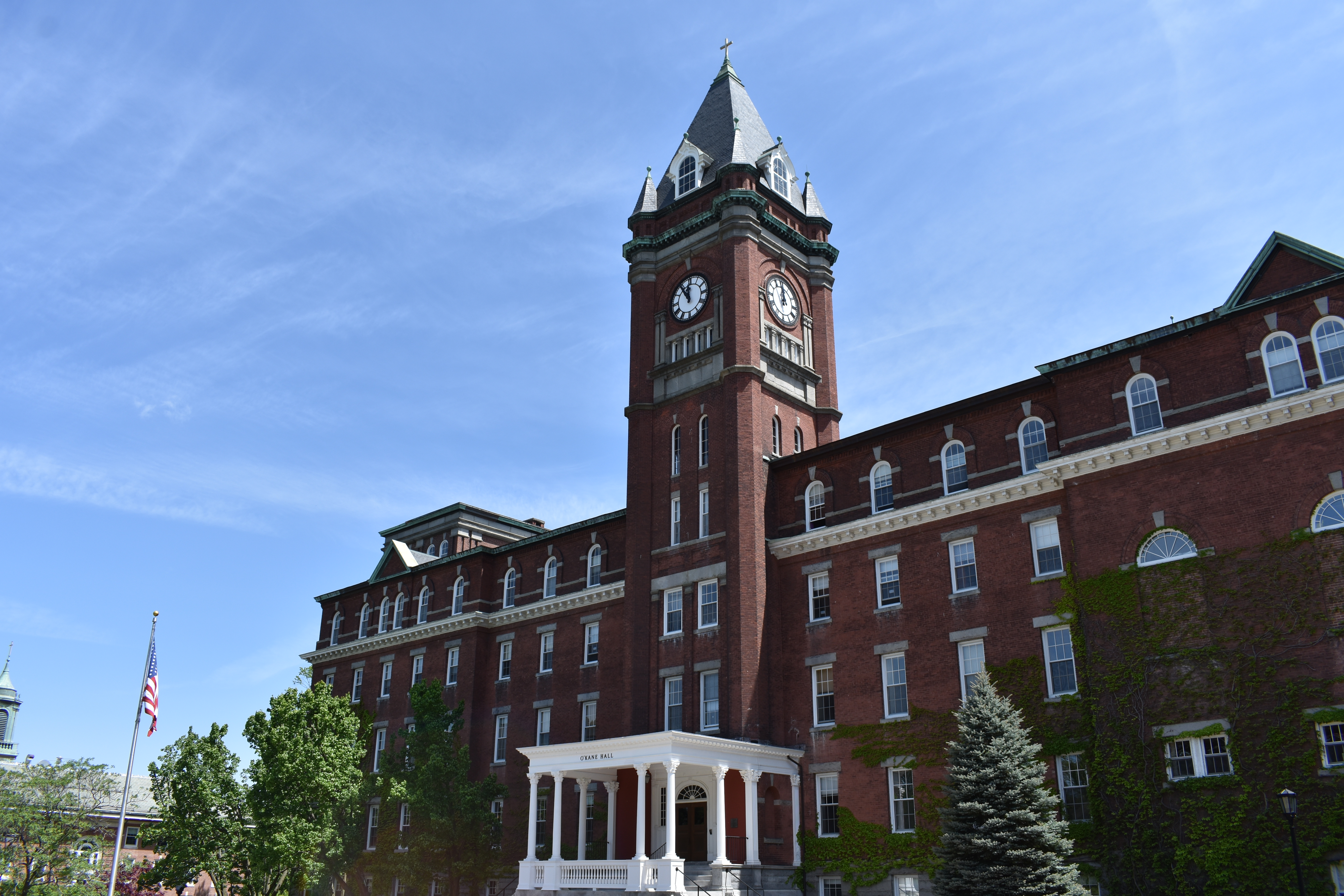
O'Kane Hall and its clock tower form part of the historic lower campus

Lower Campus contains the college's oldest buildings as well as several of its principal academic, religious, dining, and residential facilities. During its early history, Fenwick Hall and O'Kane Hall, attached to each other at right angles, housed the entire college. They now contain classrooms, faculty and administrative offices, and music facilities. The John E. Brooks, S.J. Center for Music in Fenwick includes Brooks Recital Hall, an approximately 180-seat performance space created in the college's former chapel and retaining its large stained-glass windows. O'Kane's clock tower overlooks Linden Lane, which is entered through the college's main gate on College Street.

Dinand Library, completed in 1927, is the college's main library

Smith Hall is attached to Fenwick and contains the Rehm Library, the McFarland Center for Religion, Ethics and Culture, academic departments, and several academic and administrative offices. Memorial Plaza, immediately outside Smith Hall, contains a memorial to seven Holy Cross alumni killed in the September 11 attacks.

Dinand Library, immediately uphill from the historic core of Fenwick and O'Kane, is the college's main library, named in honor of former college president Joseph N. Dinand. Designed by Maginnis & Walsh and completed in 1927 as part of a post-World War I campus expansion, it was enlarged in 1979 with the addition of the Joshua and Leah Hiatt wings. The wings, whose construction was supported by Jacob Hiatt, are named in honor of his parents and house a special collection dedicated to victims of the Holocaust. Also in 1979, sculptor Enzo Plazzotta and collector B. Gerald Cantor presented the sculpture The Hand of Christ, which was installed on the steps of Dinand Library.

St. Joseph Memorial Chapel, designed by Maginnis & Walsh

The college's principal place of worship is St. Joseph Memorial Chapel, which stands midway up Mount Saint James. Completed in 1924, it was built as a memorial to Holy Cross students and alumni killed in World War I and subsequently came to commemorate members of the college community killed in later wars. Maginnis & Walsh designed the chapel in the Renaissance Revival style, with an interior influenced by the Jesuit Church of the Gesù in Rome. Its lower level, formerly used as an auditorium and Naval ROTC space, was converted to a chapel in 1955 and contains Mary and McCooey chapels.

Kimball Hall, completed in 1935, houses the college's dining hall

Several residence halls surround Kimball Quadrangle on lower and central campus. Wheeler Hall, a residence hall that opened in 1940, is adjacent to Dinand Library; the lawn and patio behind it are known as "Wheeler Beach". Alumni and Carlin halls stand at opposite ends of the Kimball Quadrangle, and Williams Hall is situated between Alumni and Loyola halls. Carlin Hall opened in 1922 and was designed as a counterpart to Alumni Hall, whose lower-terrace site was selected in 1904 so that space would remain for a future dining hall and chapel, which later became the quadrangle. Kimball Hall, on the lower-side of the quadrangle, contains the college's main dining hall and Seelos Theatre. When it opened in January 1935, Kimball was the largest and most expensive building constructed by Holy Cross between the two world wars; its main dining room was designed for 900 people, and the building also contained an auditorium, cafeteria, and billiard room.

=== Upper Campus ===
Henry M. Hogan Campus Center

Upper Campus contains six residence halls—Brooks, Clark, Hanselman, Healy, Lehy, and Figge—all of which are located along a corridor known as Easy Street. Healy Hall, built in 1962, houses approximately 200 upper-class students and stands on Easy Street between Hogan Campus Center and Lehy Hall. Figge Hall, completed in 2011, is a four-story apartment-style residence containing 39 apartments for 156 seniors. Ciampi-Condron Hall, originally built as a Jesuit residence, is located next to the Hogan Campus Center. The City View Townhouses opened in 2023 and provide senior-only apartment housing across from the Joanne Chouinard-Luth Recreation and Wellness Center. The Henry M. Hogan Campus Center contains student-organization and administrative offices, dining and retail facilities, and a ballroom.

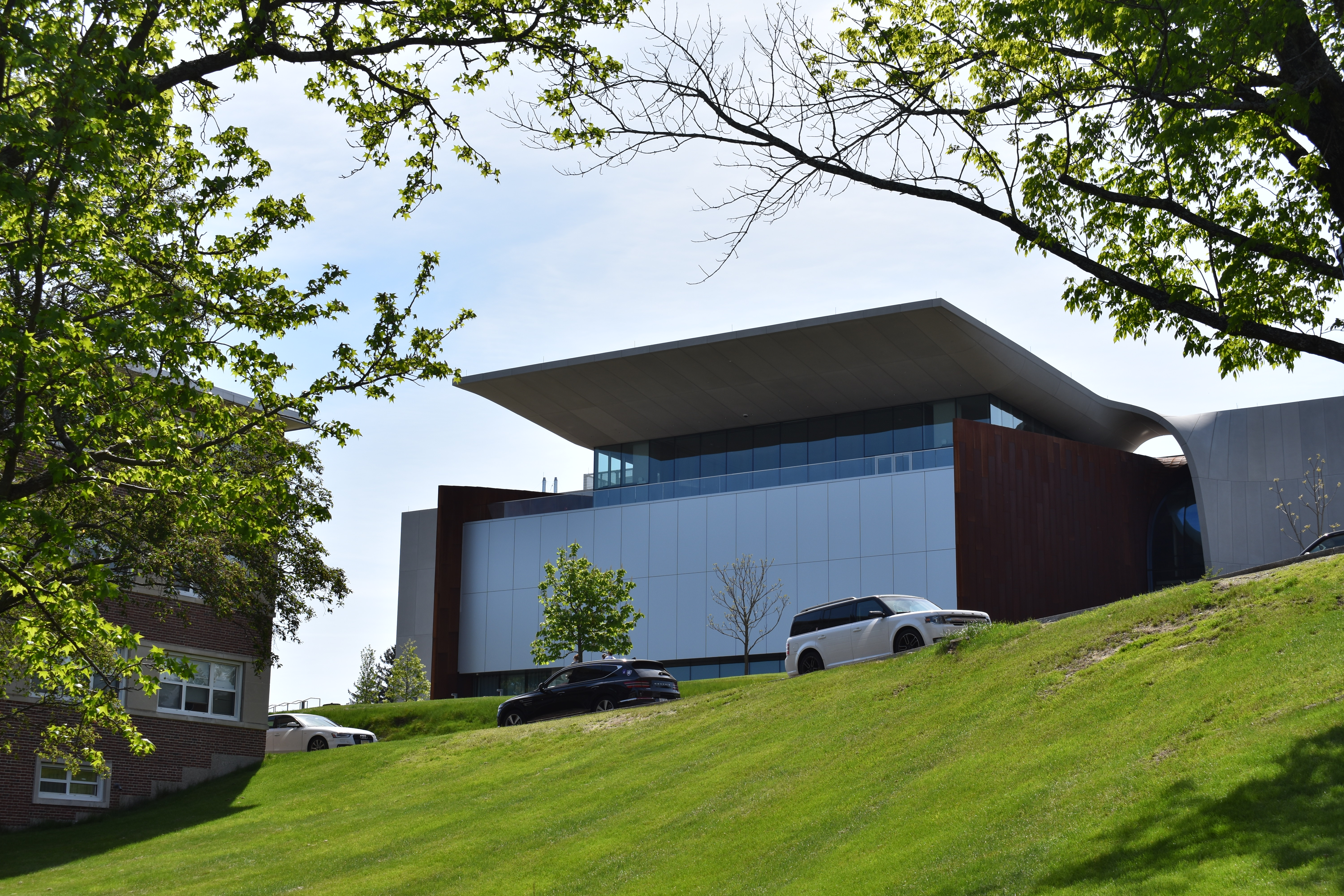
The Prior Performing Arts Center, designed by Diller Scofidio + Renfro, opened in fall 2022.

The Prior Performing Arts Center is located on Upper Campus between the Hogan Campus Center and the Hart Center at the Luth Athletic Complex. Completed in 2022, the 84,000-square-foot (7,800 m^{2}), $110 million building was designed by Diller Scofidio + Renfro. Its facilities include the 400-seat Luth Concert Hall, the 200-seat Boroughs Theatre, and the Iris and B. Gerald Cantor Art Gallery. Four interior pavilions containing theater, art and media, rehearsal, and production spaces surround a central atrium known as the Beehive.

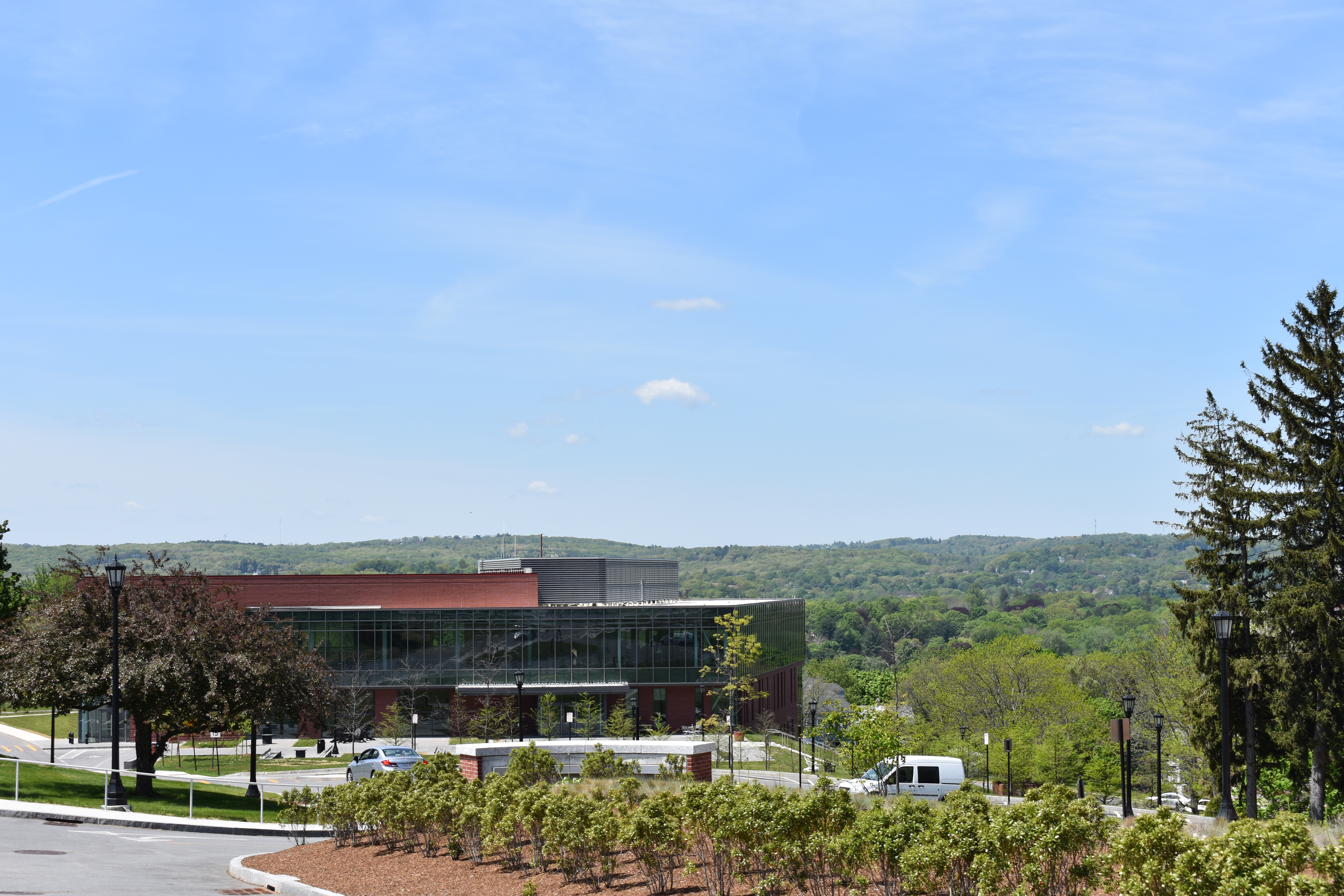
Joanne Chouinard-Luth Recreation and Wellness Center

The Linda Johnson Smith Soccer Stadium and Kuzniewski Field, the latter an artificial-turf field surrounded by an eight-lane running track, are located on Upper Campus. Kuzniewski Field serves Crusaders football and Crusaders men's lacrosse. The adjacent Hart Center at the Luth Athletic Complex is the main athletics building for the Holy Cross Crusaders. A phased renovation and expansion of the Hart Center designed by Sasaki Associates was completed in 2017. Farther toward the College Street entrance is the Joanne Chouinard-Luth Recreation and Wellness Center ("The Jo"), which opened in 2021 at the upper-campus entrance on the site of the former Field House.

Figge Hall, a senior residence completed in 2011, was the second building at Holy Cross to receive LEED Gold certification.

=== Other facilities ===
The college owns the Thomas P. Joyce '59 Contemplative Center on a 52-acre (21 ha) property in West Boylston, Massachusetts, approximately a 20-minute drive from the Worcester campus. Opened in 2016, the 33,800-square-foot (3,140 m^{2}) complex overlooks the Wachusett Reservoir conservation area.

Holy Cross's rowing teams use the Donahue Rowing Center at the northern end of Lake Quinsigamond in Shrewsbury, Massachusetts. The center opened in 1992 and was expanded by four boat-storage bays in 2002.

== Academics ==
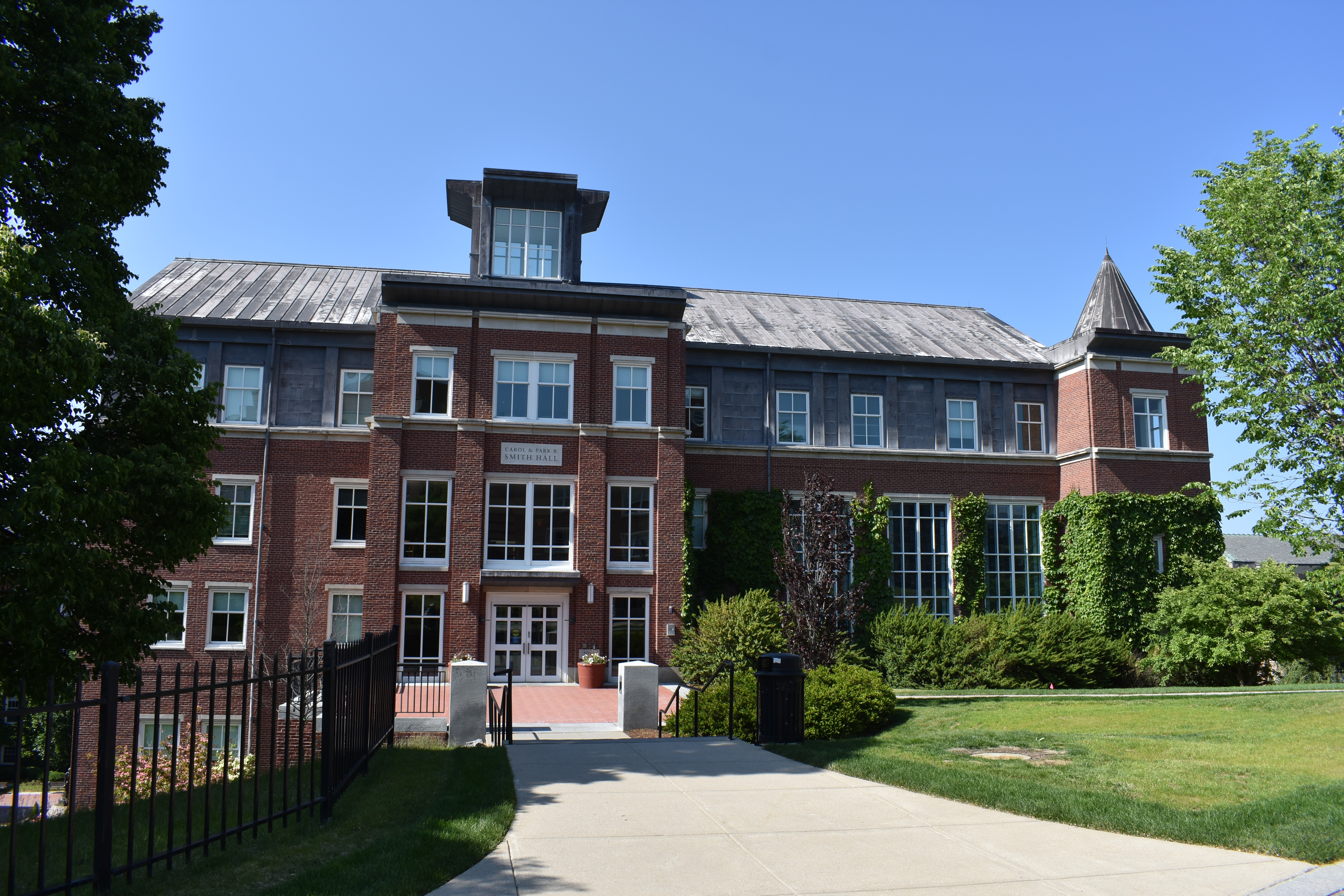
Smith Hall houses the religious study department and Rehm Library

Holy Cross is noted for its departments in political science, economics, chemistry, classics, (Note: The college houses one of the largest departments in the country dedicated to the classics.) and literature. Programs in sociology, psychology, and mathematics are also popular among students, as are concentrations in philosophy and religious studies which relate to Jesuit focuses.

Holy Cross has 328 faculty members who teach 3,142 undergraduate students. It offers 28 majors mainly focused on a liberal arts curriculum, each of which leads to the completion of the Bachelor of Arts degree; the college is accredited by the New England Commission of Higher Education.

All B.A. candidates must successfully complete 32 semester courses in eight semesters of full-time study to graduate. Common requirements include one course each in arts, literature, religion, philosophy, history, and cross-cultural studies; and two courses each in language studies, social science, and natural and mathematical sciences. Its most popular majors, by 2021 graduates, were: Economics (131), Psychology (102), Political Science & Government (88), English Language and Literature (54), Biology/Biological Sciences (52), History (46).

=== Social justice and volunteerism ===
The Fauci Integrated Science Complex

In 2010, Holy Cross obtained the highest rank of the 28 U.S. Jesuit colleges and universities in the percentage of its graduates who go on to serve in the Jesuit Volunteer Corps.

Holy Cross has embraced sometimes controversial schools of theological thought, including liberation theology and social justice. As a result, in 1974, Time magazine referred to Holy Cross as the "cradle of the Catholic Left" because it educated Philip Berrigan and socialist leader Michael Harrington, author of the influential book on poverty, The Other America.

Holy Cross, similar to the religious order of the Jesuits as a whole, has been criticized by some parties for being overly liberal and deviating substantially from official Church teaching and papal directives, especially on such issues as abortion, homosexuality, liberation theology, and in its sponsorship of events such as the Vagina Monologues. Since 2000, the college has hosted a conference allowing seminars from Planned Parenthood and NARAL. In 2007, Robert Joseph McManus, the diocese's bishop, wrote the college asking McFarland to cancel the event, and threatened to remove the Catholic status of the college if the conference was not cancelled.

In 2001, Holy Cross was one of 28 colleges and universities in the country to receive a grant from the Lilly Endowment in the amount of $2 million. With the grant, the school launched a five-year program to "make theological and spiritual resources available to students as they discern their life work, including consideration of vocations of ministerial service within religious denominations". The grant has also been used to fund internships within the city of Worcester and Worcester County for students considering career opportunities in ministry, government, and social service agencies.

== Rankings and reputation ==
Academic rankings

Liberal arts
- U.S. News & World Report: 27
- Washington Monthly: 31

National
- Forbes: 102
- WSJ/College Pulse: 60

U.S. News & World Report ranked Holy Cross tied for 27th in the U.S. among liberal arts colleges for 2023, 41st for best undergraduate education, 89th in "Best Value Schools", and tied for 59th in "Top Performers on Social Mobility". Holy Cross is the highest ranking Catholic college among the top 30 liberal arts schools on the U.S. News list. The college is a top producer of Fulbright scholars, of which it has graduated 182 recipients as of 2023.

Money ranked Holy Cross as the 5th best liberal arts college in the U.S. as of 2022. In 2025, Forbes ranked Holy Cross 103rd among all colleges and universities in its "America's Top Colleges" list and 27th among liberal arts colleges. In 2020, Washington Monthly ranked Holy Cross 18th among liberal arts colleges in the U.S. based on its contribution to the public good as measured by social mobility, research, and promoting public service.

Kiplinger's Personal Finance placed Holy Cross at 15th in its 2019 ranking of 149 best value liberal arts colleges in the United States. In PayScale's 2019–20 study, Holy Cross ranked 17th in the nation among liberal arts colleges for mid-career salary potential.

In the 2023 Times Higher Education ranking of top Catholic colleges and universities published by The Wall Street Journal (WSJ), Holy Cross placed fourth nationally. In the WSJ and College Pulse 2024 rankings, Holy Cross was the seventh best college in Massachusetts and the 60th best college nationally.

=== Admissions ===
Admissions statistics
- 2023 entering class
- Admit rate: 21% (▼ −18)
- Yield rate: 45% (▲ +13.8)

Test scores middle 50%
- SAT EBRW: 680–730
- SAT Math: 660–720
- ACT Composite: 29–33

High school GPA^{[ii]}
- Top 10%: 61%
- Top 25%: 86%

Admissions to Holy Cross is considered "more selective" by U.S. News & World Report. In 2024, the school reported its lowest admissions rate in its history—17.6 percent—among the largest applicant pool. Holy Cross has traditionally drawn many of its students from a pool of historical Catholic high schools and private boarding schools, though a majority of current undergraduates come from public schools.

In 2022, the middle 50% SAT score range for those who submitted a score was 1260–1430 out of 1600; the middle 50% ACT composite score range was 28–32. Holy Cross admitted its first women students in 1972, and its student population is currently majority female. Holy Cross was described as one of the Hidden Ivies for its academics and admissions process which are comparable to the Ivy League in the guide The Hidden Ivies, 3rd Edition: 63 of America's Top Liberal Arts Colleges and Universities, published in 2016.

In May 2005, Holy Cross announced that it would no longer make standardized test scores an admissions requirement. College officials said this policy would reduce the importance of admissions tests and place greater weight on the academic experience of a candidate as demonstrated through the high school transcript and recommendations. Tuition for full-time students for the 2022–23 academic year was $57,600.

== Student life ==
=== Residential life ===
Carlin Hall, a residence hall opened in 1922, was originally named Loyola Hall before being renamed in 1941 for former college president James J. Carlin.

Upperclassmen students can choose, depending on the results of the housing lottery held in the Spring, between the Easy Street residence halls, minus Hanselman, or the upperclass residence halls in the lower portion of campus: Alumni, Carlin, and Loyola. Additionally, seniors have the options of Williams Hall, formerly known as "The Senior Apartments", Figge Hall and the townhouses.

The apartments in Williams Hall, Figge Hall and the senior townhouses are the most sought after living arrangements on campus. For Williams and Figge Halls, each apartment houses four students and is equipped with a bathroom with separate shower, kitchen, living room, and two bedrooms. Williams Hall was completed in 2003 and rededicated in honor of Edward Bennett Williams on April 26, 2008. In 2011, the college dedicated Figge Hall, located on the upper campus closer to the Easy Street halls.

Second-year to fourth-year students also have the option of living off-campus but only a small percentage do so, as the school has built additional housing in recent years and the number of desirable apartments near campus is limited.

=== Student groups ===
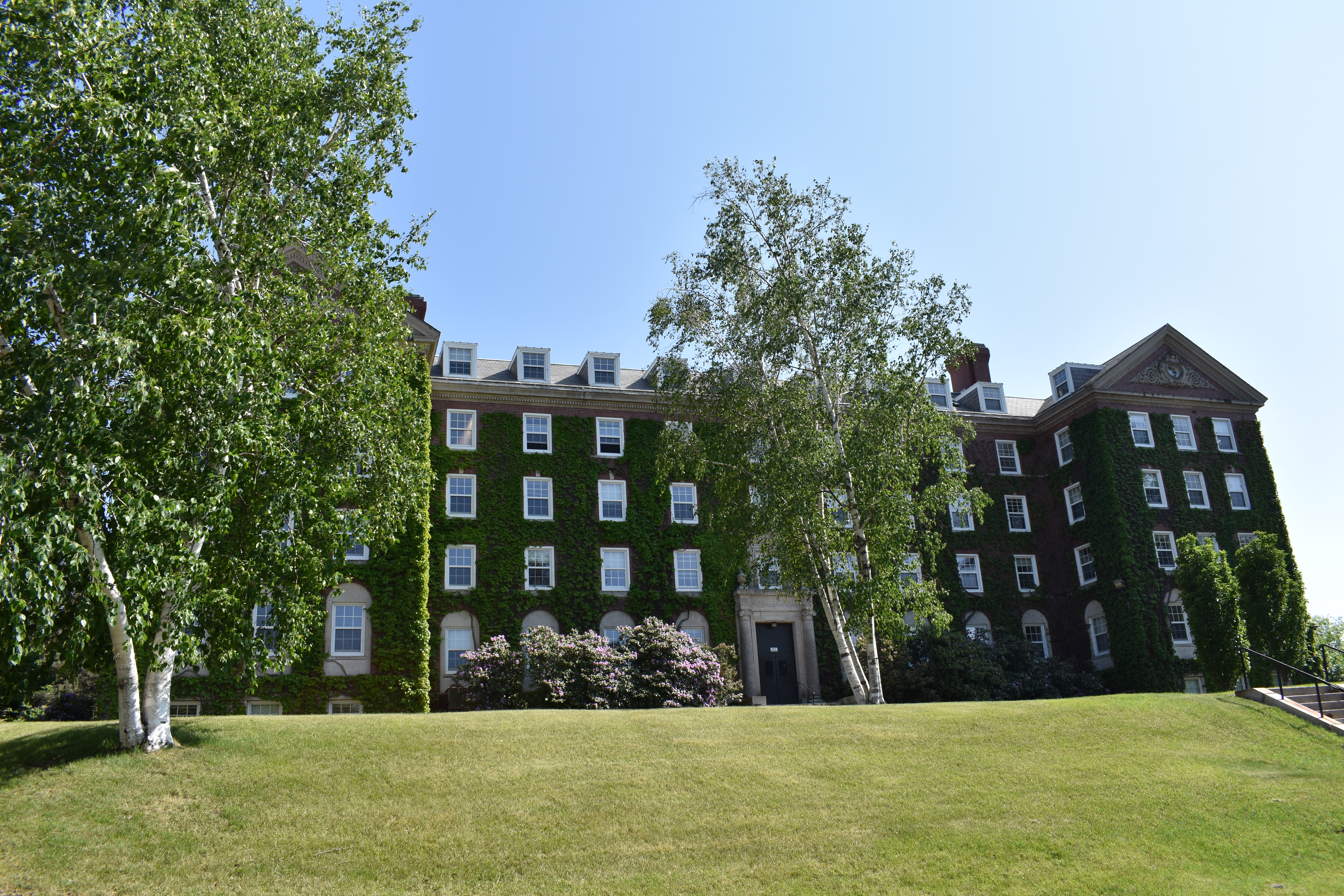
Wheeler Hall, opened in January 1940, was the college's first fully integrated dorm.

A large number of student organizations are associated with the college. With its relative distance from a major city, and without a Greek life at Holy Cross, undergraduate social life revolves around a number of school-sponsored groups, events, and off-campus houses on nearby city streets (notably Boyden, Cambridge, Caro, Chelsea, Clay, College, and Southbridge streets) which are open to upperclassmen.

The college also features a variety of student journals, media, and newspapers including The Fenwick Review, a journal of conservative thought; The Advocate, a journal based in liberal principles; and The Spire, the weekly newspaper published by Holy Cross students for the college community.

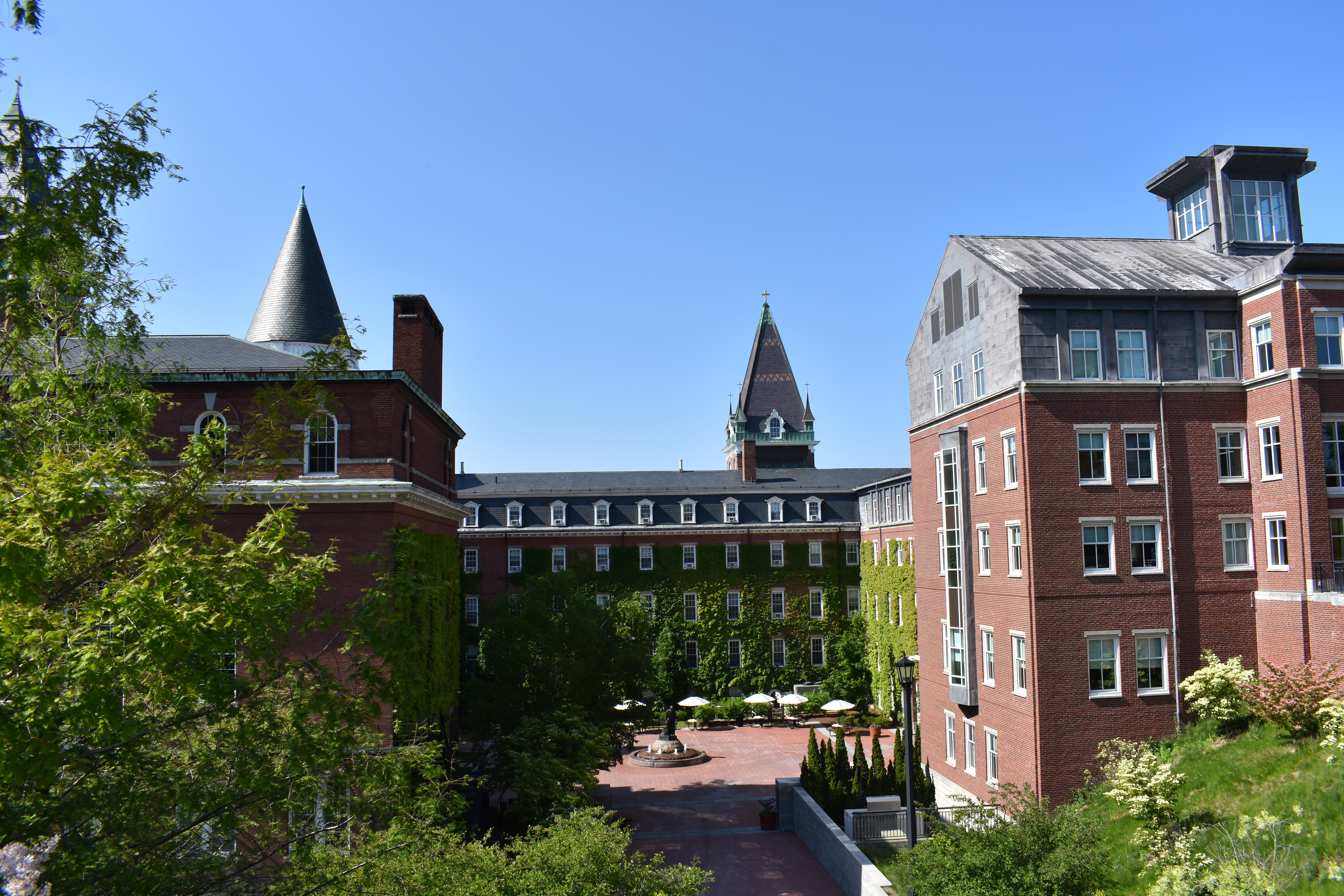
Memorial Plaza outside Smith Hall commemorates seven alumni killed in the September 11 attacks. The bronze plaque bearing their names was dedicated in March 2002.

Holy Cross has a student-run radio station, WCHC-FM 88.1. WCHC is a non-profit radio station that broadcasts commercial-free year round. The athletics department carries live broadcasts of many of the school's football, basketball, and hockey games. Holy Cross also has a law journal, The Holy Cross Journal of Law & Public Policy, which is published annually by undergraduate students. The Campus Activities Board (CAB), a student-run organization, runs several committees that oversee campus-wide activities and student services with a focus on evening and weekend programming. The Student Government Association (SGA) charters and provides most of the funding for these programs, and represents students' interests when dealing with the administration.

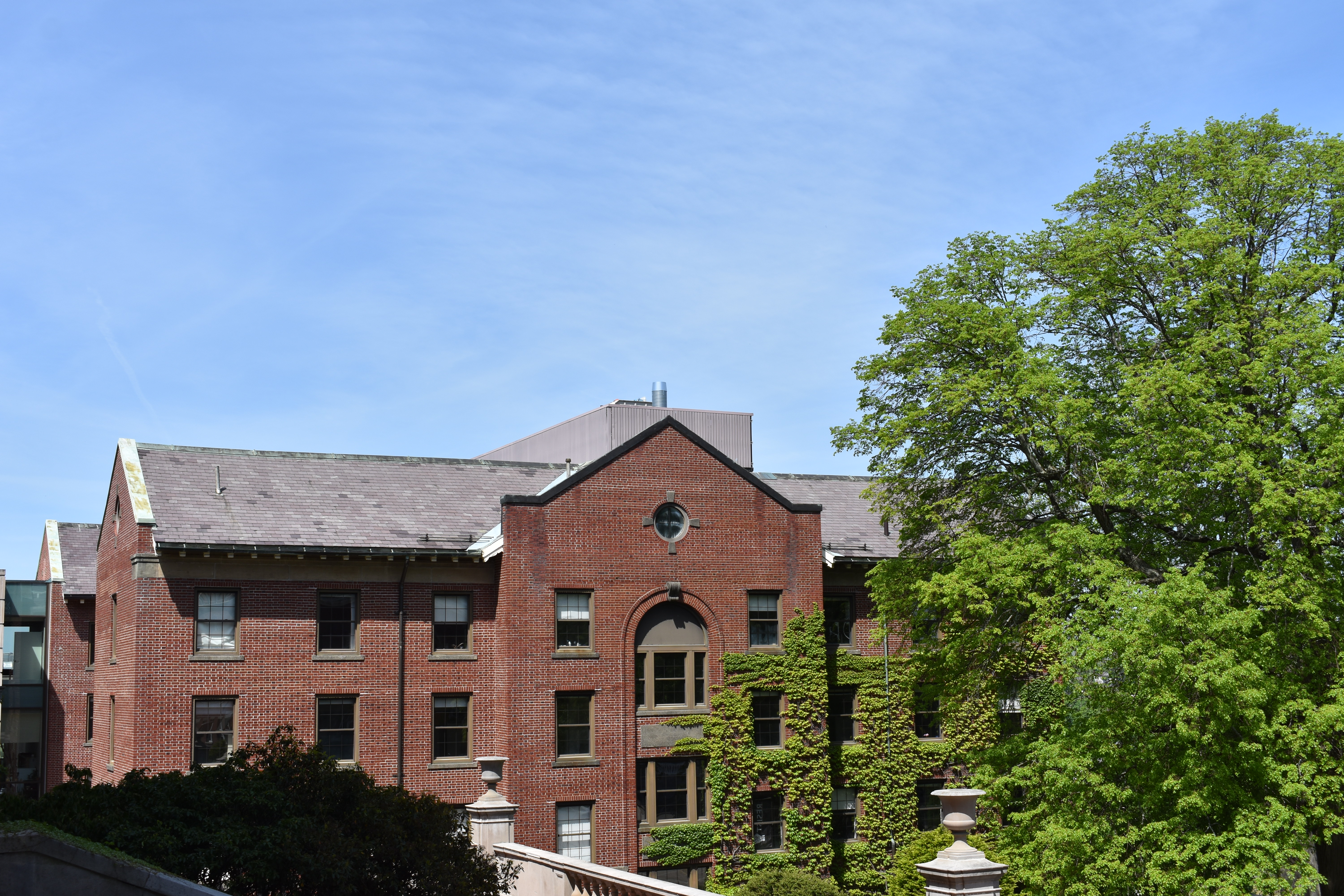
Beaven Hall, built in 1913 after alumnus and bishop Thomas D. Beaven organized diocesan fundraising for a new residence hall and classroom building.

The largest student organization at Holy Cross, Student Programs for Urban Development (SPUD), is a community service organization sponsored by the college Chaplains' Office consisting of over 45 different outreach programs and over 600 active members. Other volunteer and social justice programs offered by Holy Cross include Pax Christi, the Appalachia Service Project, Oxfam America (formerly Student Coalition on Hunger and Homelessness (SCOHAH)), and the Arrupe Immersion Program, named in honor of Pedro Arrupe, which Holy Cross describes as "a faith based program responding to the call to work for peace and justice in the world".

The Holy Cross Knights of Columbus council is the third oldest college council in the order having been established in 1929.

Formed in 1845, the Holy Cross Goodtime Marching Band is one of the oldest organizations at the college, and one of the oldest college bands in the United States. They are joined at athletic events by the Holy Cross Cheer Team.

== Insignia and representations of Holy Cross ==
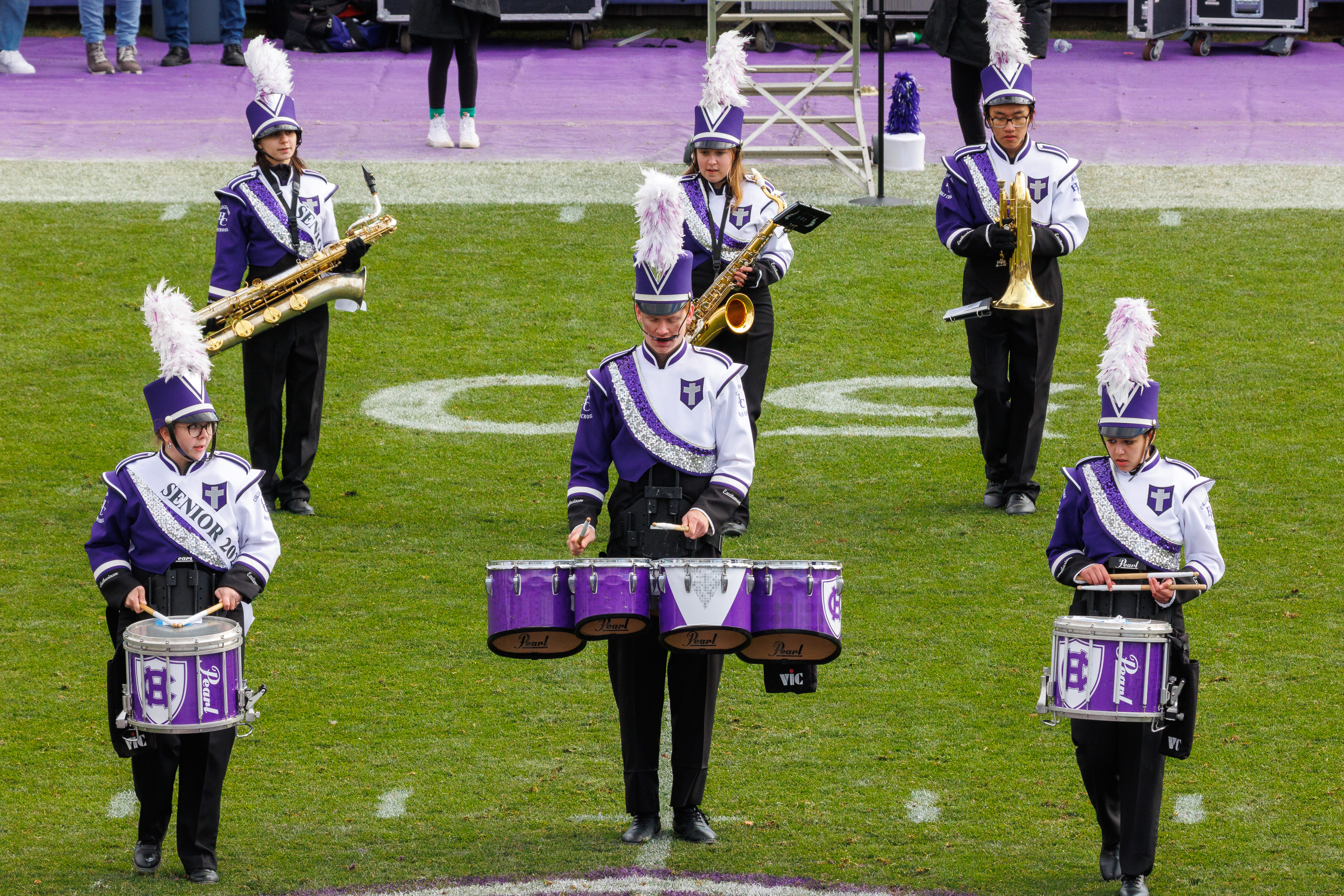
Holy Cross Goodtime Marching Band

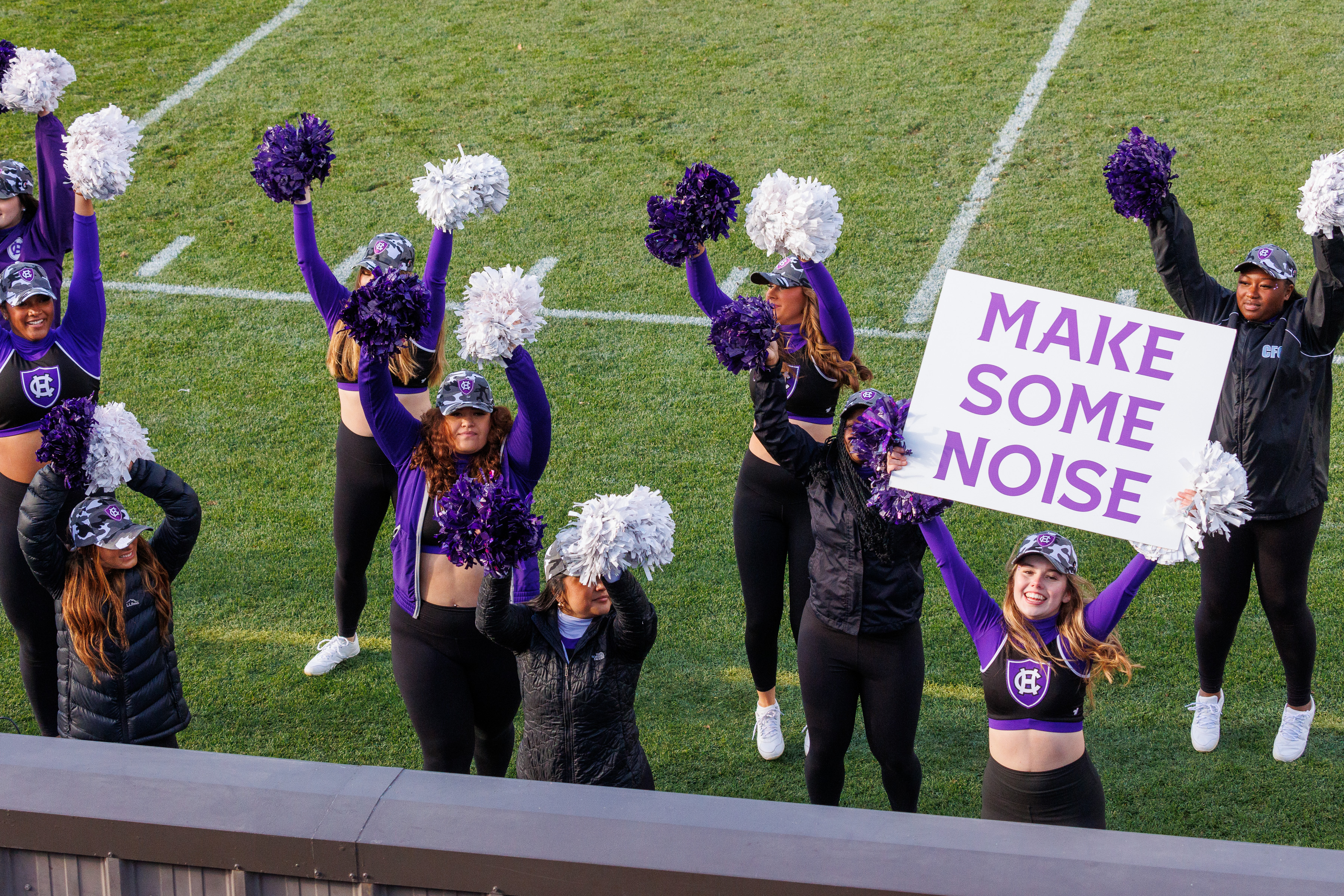
Holy Cross Cheer Team

=== Color ===
The school color is purple. There are two theories of how Holy Cross chose purple as its official color. One suggests it was derived from the royal purple used by Constantine the Great (born about 275 A.D., died in 337 A.D.) as displayed on his labarum (military standard) and on those of later Christian emperors of Rome.

=== College seal ===
The seal of the College of the Holy Cross is described as follows:

The outer circle states in Latin "College of the Holy Cross, Society of Jesus, Worcester, Massachusetts".

The inner shield contains an open book (symbol of learning) and a cross of gold (symbol of Christian faith). Written in the book is the college's motto, In Hoc Signo Vinces, which translates as, "By this sign thou shalt conquer". The phrase is credited to Constantine the Great.

The cross divides the lower part of the shield into quarters, which are alternately red and sable, the colors on the ancient shield of Worcester, England. The upper part of the shield has in its center the emblem of the Society of Jesus, a blazing sun with the letters IHS, the first three letters of Jesus' name in Greek. On either side is a martlet, reminiscent of those on the ancestral crest of Bishop Fenwick.

=== Mascot ===
Holy Cross's athletic teams for both men and women are known as the Crusaders. It is reported that the name "Crusader" was first associated with Holy Cross in 1884 at an alumni banquet in Boston, where an engraved Crusader mounted on an armored horse appeared at the head of the menu. In 2018, the college decided to phase out of using the Knight imagery, retiring the Holy Cross mascot Iggy T. Crusader. Holy Cross opted instead for the secondary (now primary) logo of a purple shield with an interlocking "HC".

== Athletics ==
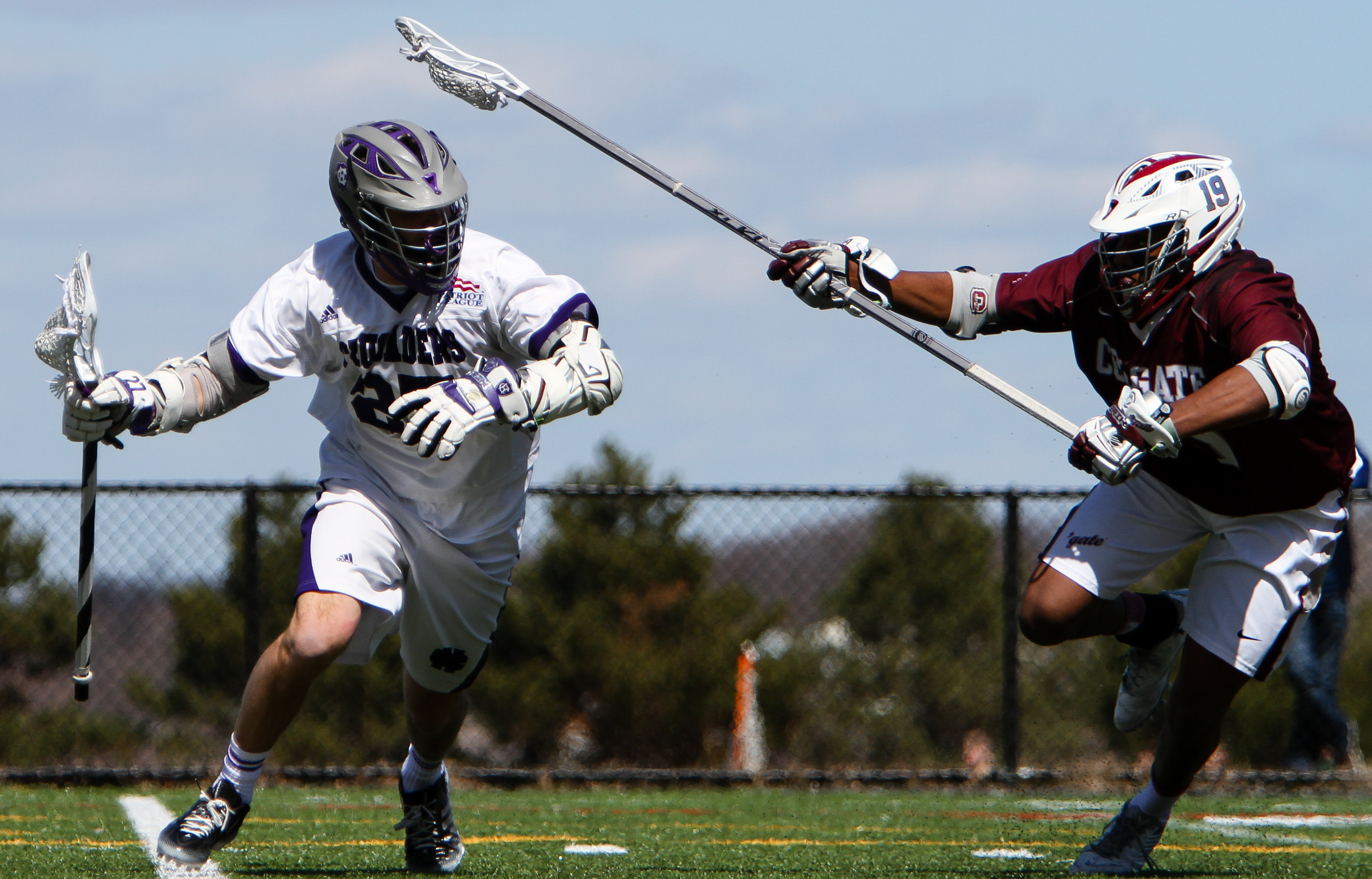
The Crusaders men's lacrosse team plays a game against the Colgate Raiders in 2015

Holy Cross sponsors 27 varsity sports, all of which compete at the NCAA Division I level (FCS for football). The Crusaders are members of the Patriot League, the Atlantic Hockey America for men's ice hockey, and Hockey East Association in women's ice hockey. Of its 27 varsity teams, Holy Cross supports 13 men's and 14 women's sports. The carrying of 26 Division I varsity programs gives Holy Cross the largest ratio of teams-per-enrollment in the country.

The college is a founding member of the Patriot League, and claims that one-quarter of its student body participates in its varsity athletic programs. The league began allowing schools to offer athletic scholarships for all sports except football in 2001, after American University joined the league, and in 2012 league members were authorized to offer football scholarships as well.

Principal athletic facilities include the Fitton Field football stadium (capacity 23,500), Hart Recreation Center's basketball court (3,600), the Hanover Insurance Park at Fitton Field (3,000), Hart Ice Rink (1,600), Linda Johnson Smith Soccer Stadium (1,320), and Smith Wellness Center located inside the Hart Center. The Linda Johnson Smith Soccer Stadium opened in the fall of 2006.

Holy Cross is one of eight schools to have won an NCAA championship in both baseball and basketball, having won the 1952 College World Series and the 1947 NCAA Division I Men's Basketball Tournament. The college has also won the 1954 National Invitation Tournament and participated in the 1946 Orange Bowl. Since electing to focus more on academics than athletics, the college has had several notable moments on the national stage. In 2006, the Holy Cross men's ice hockey team upset the No. 1 seed Minnesota Golden Gophers in the 2006 NCAA Division I Men's Ice Hockey Tournament. In 2016, the Holy Cross men's basketball team qualified for the NCAA tournament, earning its first tournament win since 1953.

== Alumni ==
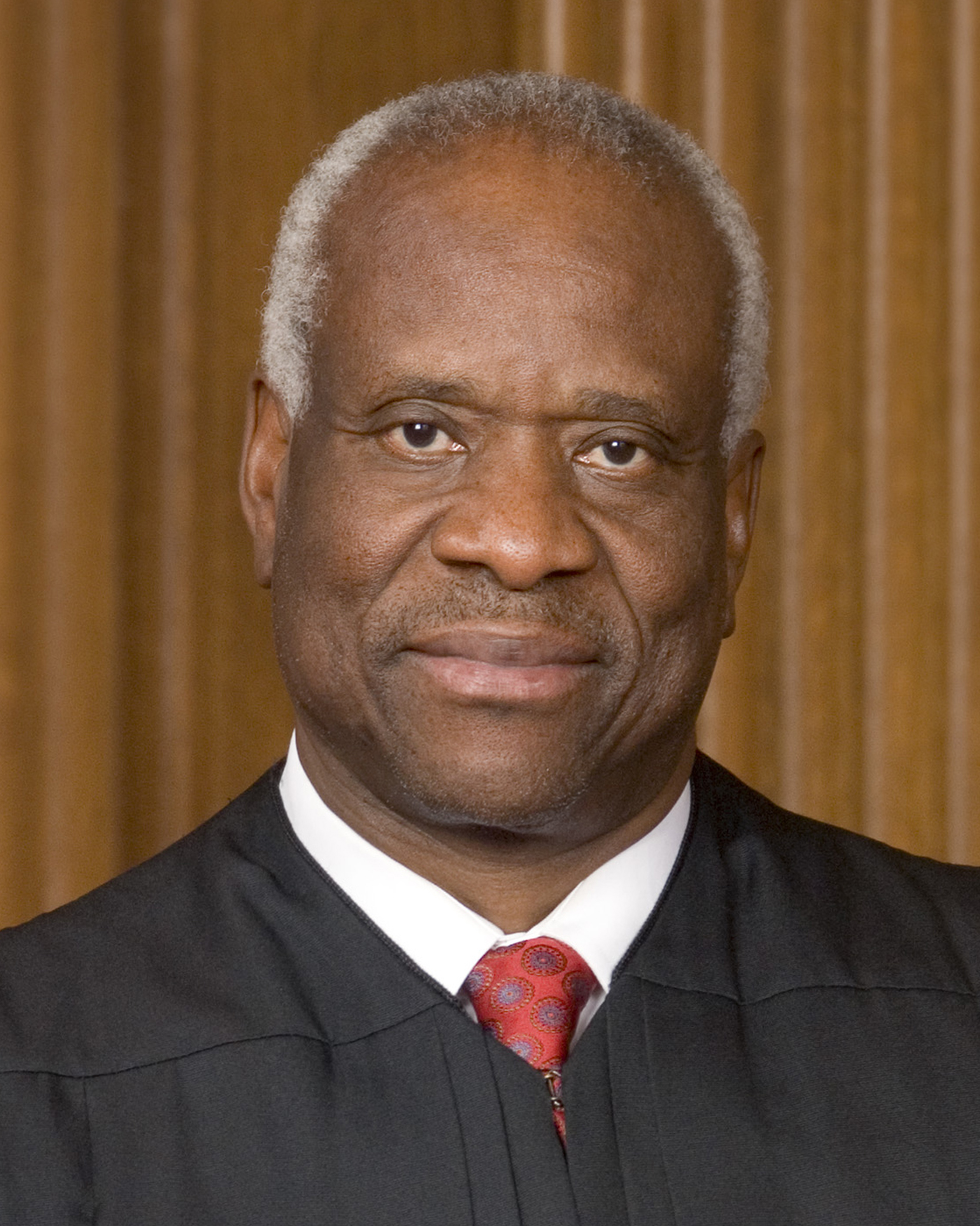
Clarence Thomas,
Associate Justice of the Supreme Court of the United States

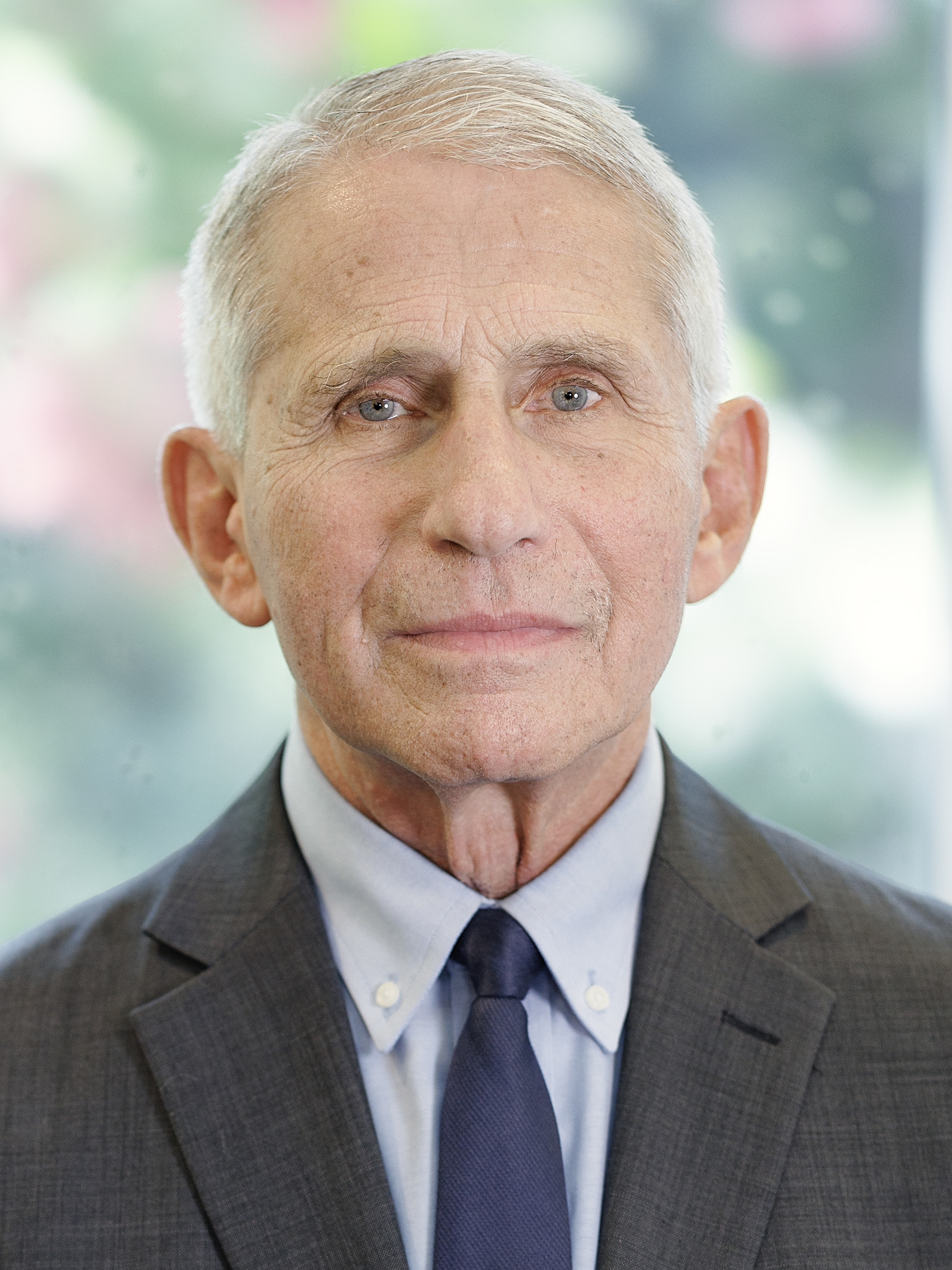
Anthony Fauci,
Director of the National Institute of Allergy and Infectious Diseases

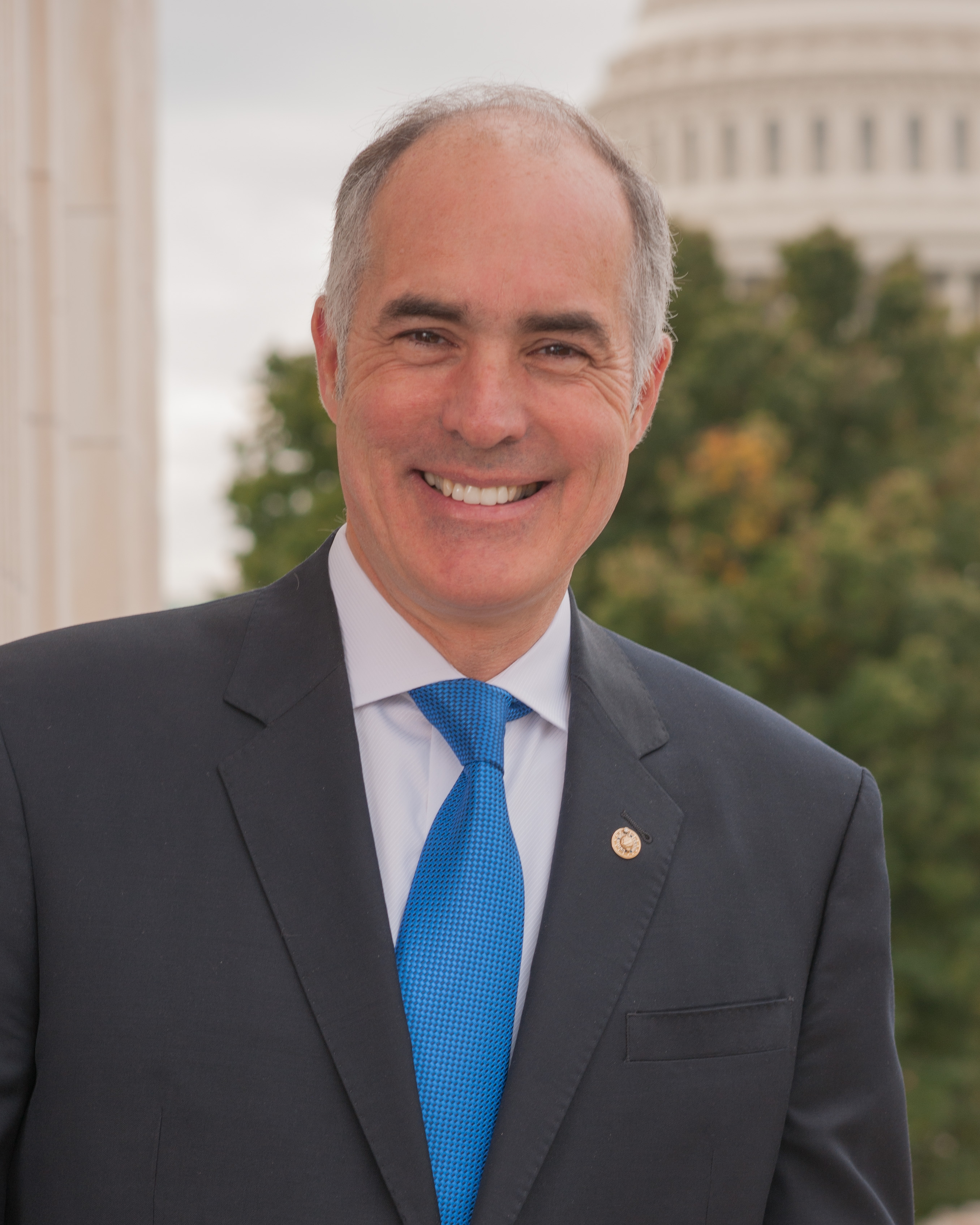
Bob Casey Jr.,
U.S. Senator from Pennsylvania

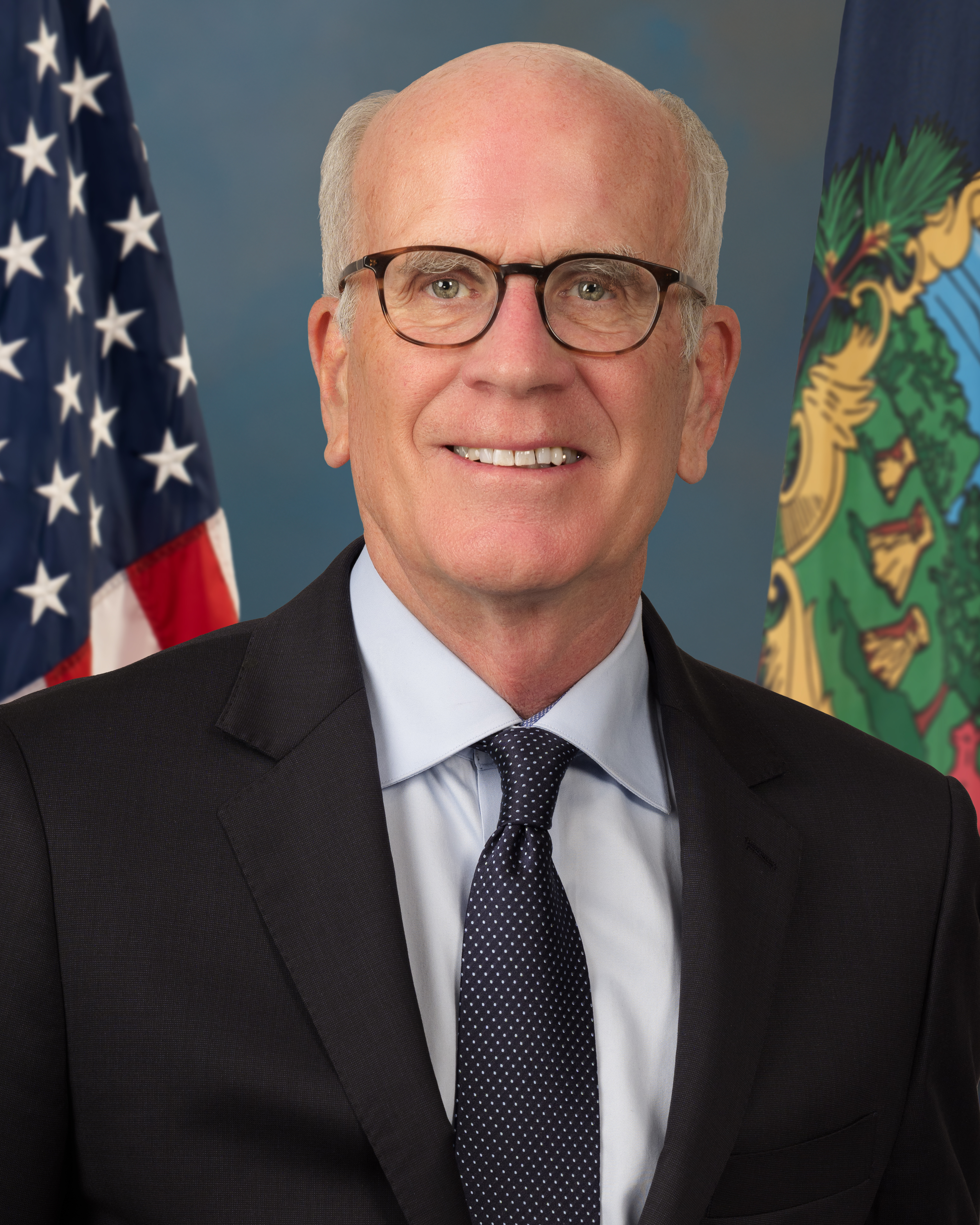
Peter Welch,
U.S. Senator from Vermont

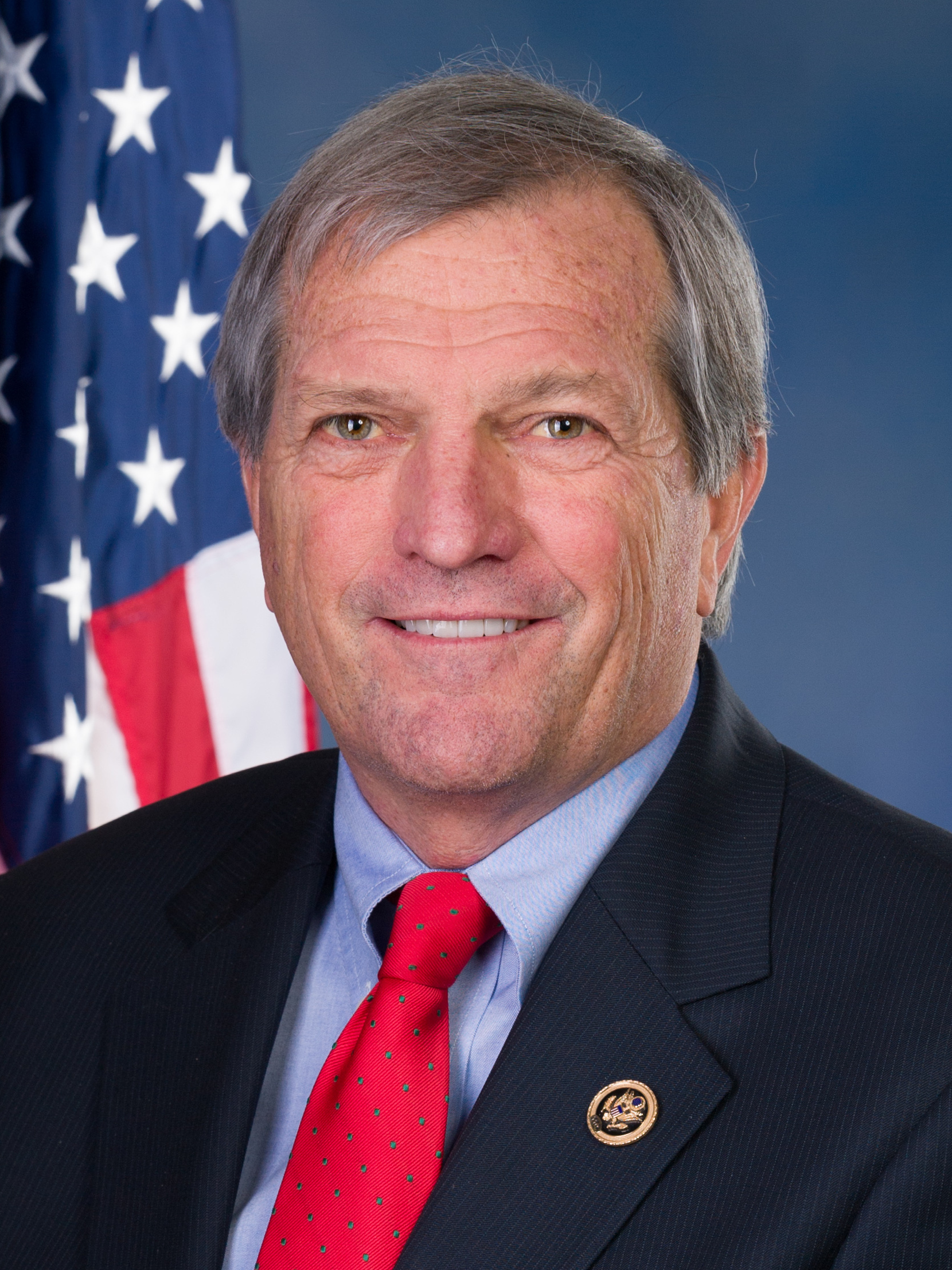
Mark DeSaulnier,
U.S. Representative from California

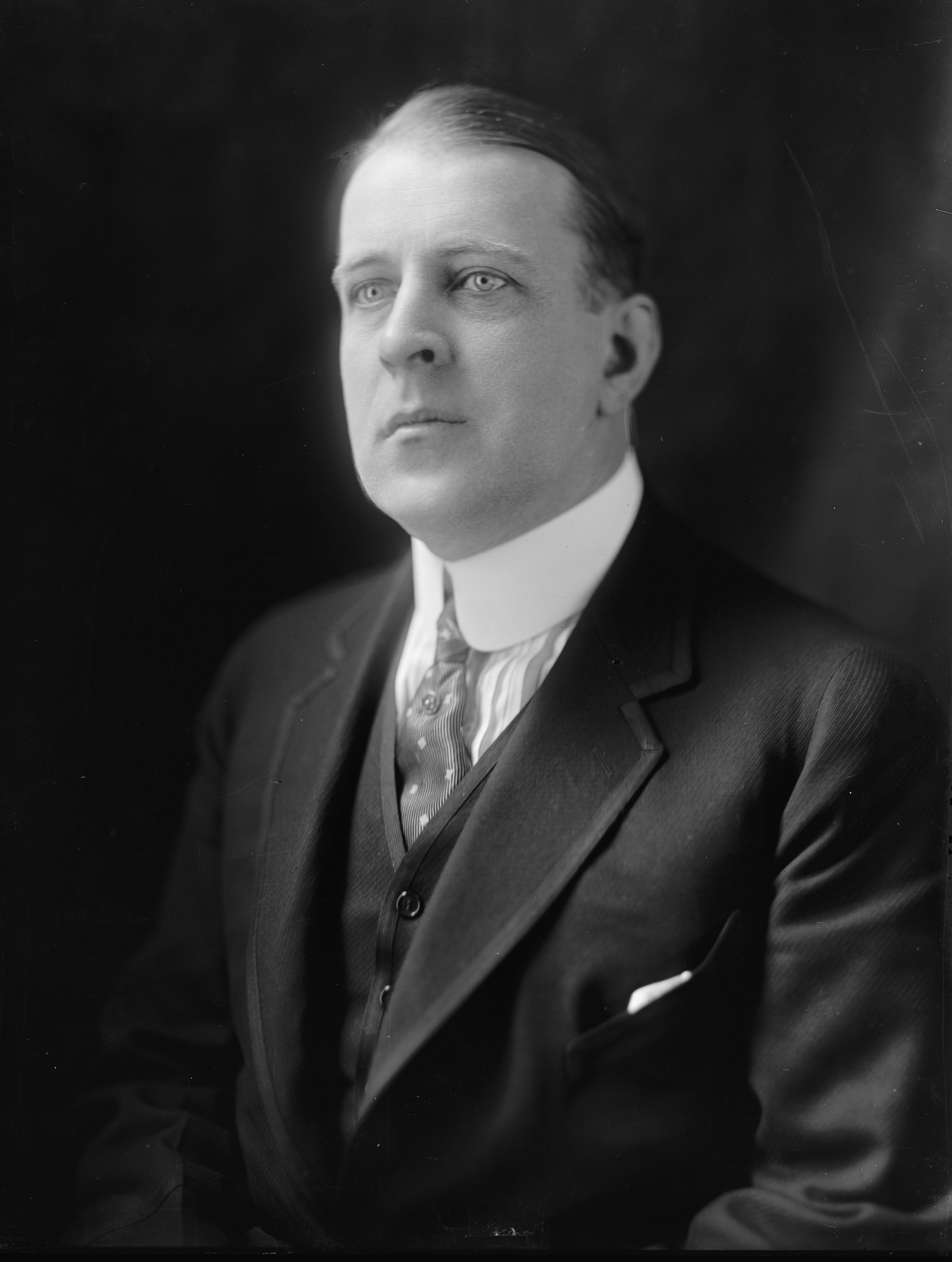
David I. Walsh,
U.S. Senator from Massachusetts

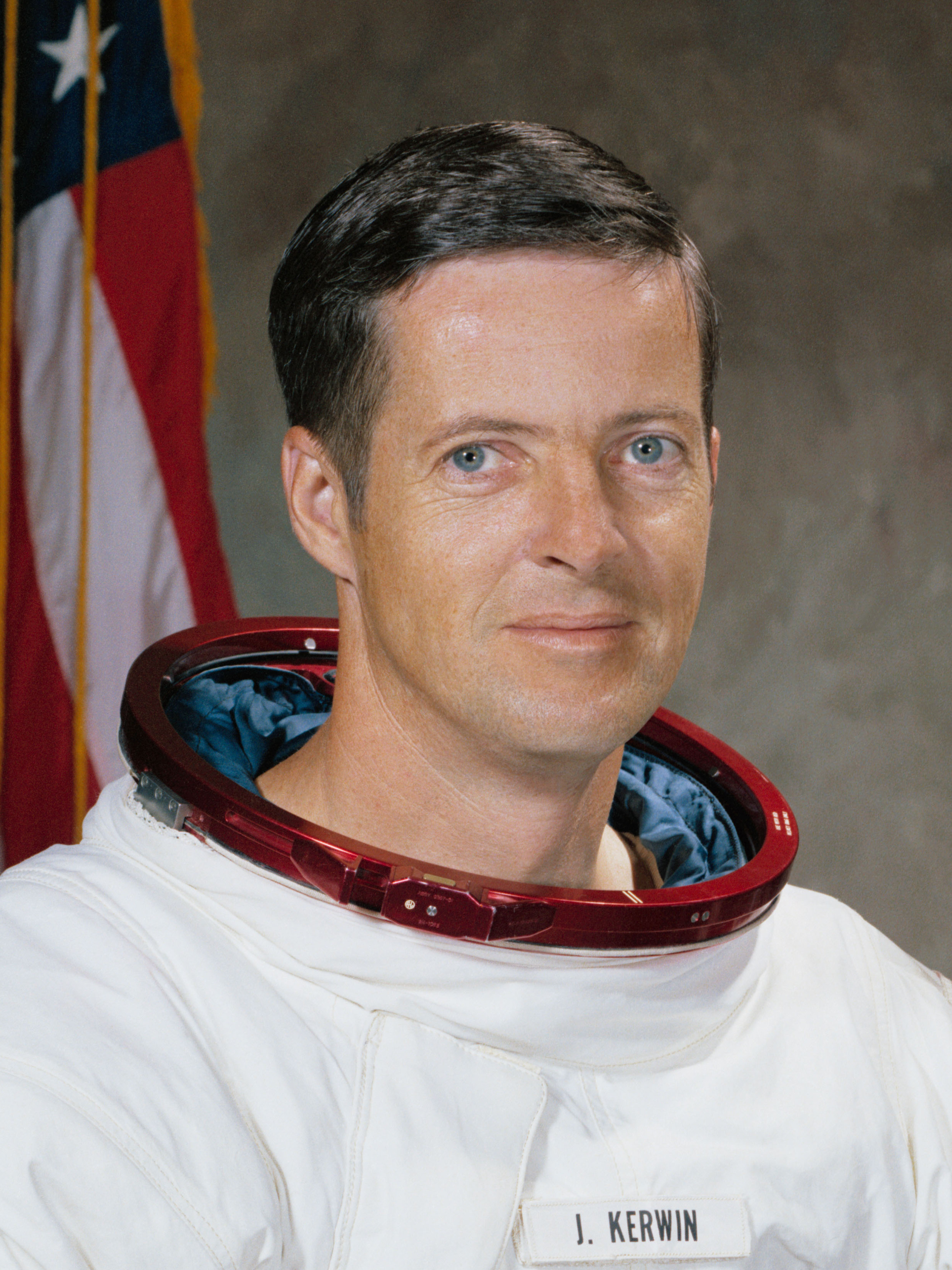
Joseph P. Kerwin,
NASA Astronaut for Skylab 2

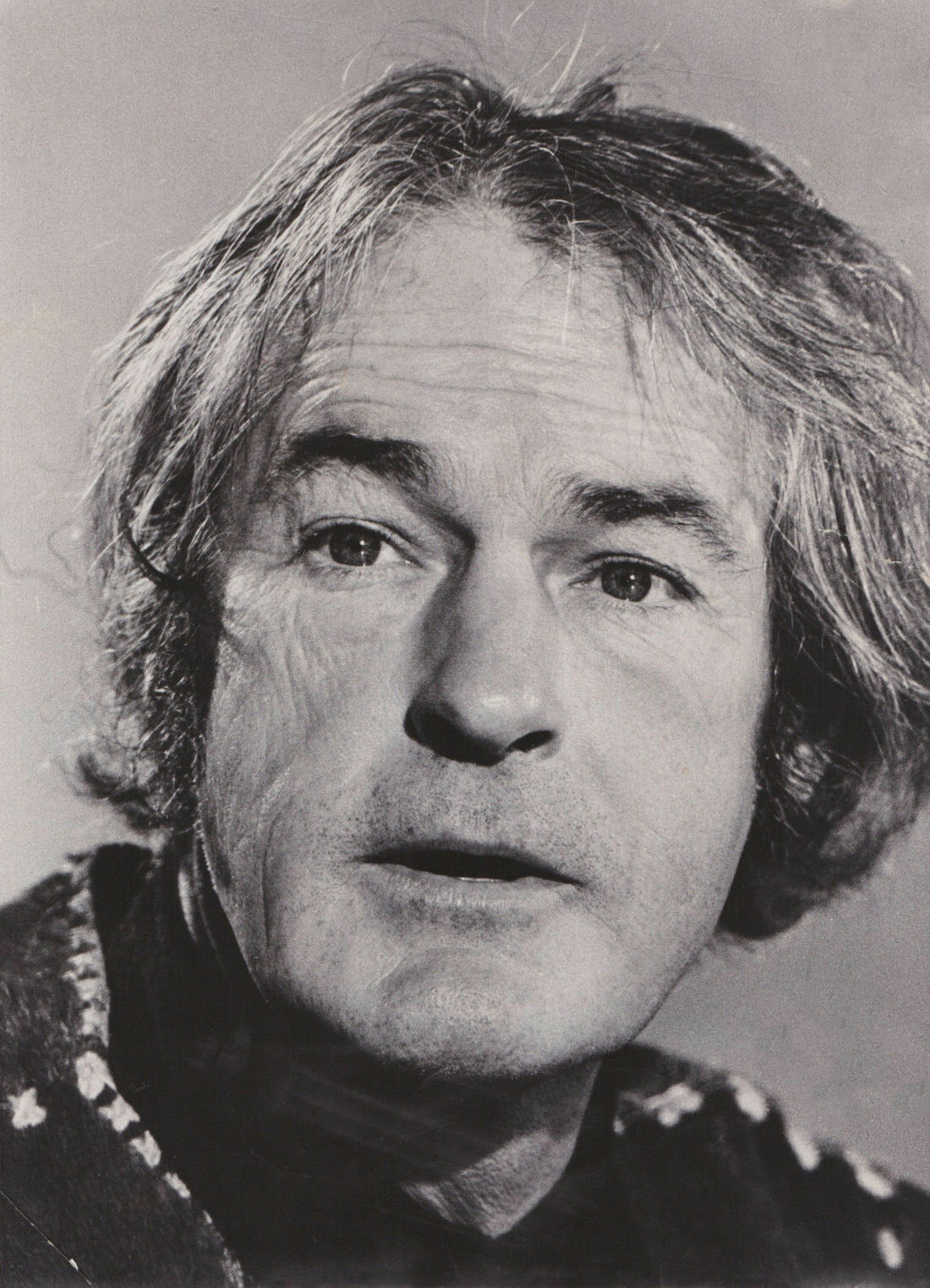
Timothy Leary,
Harvard psychologist and drug advocate

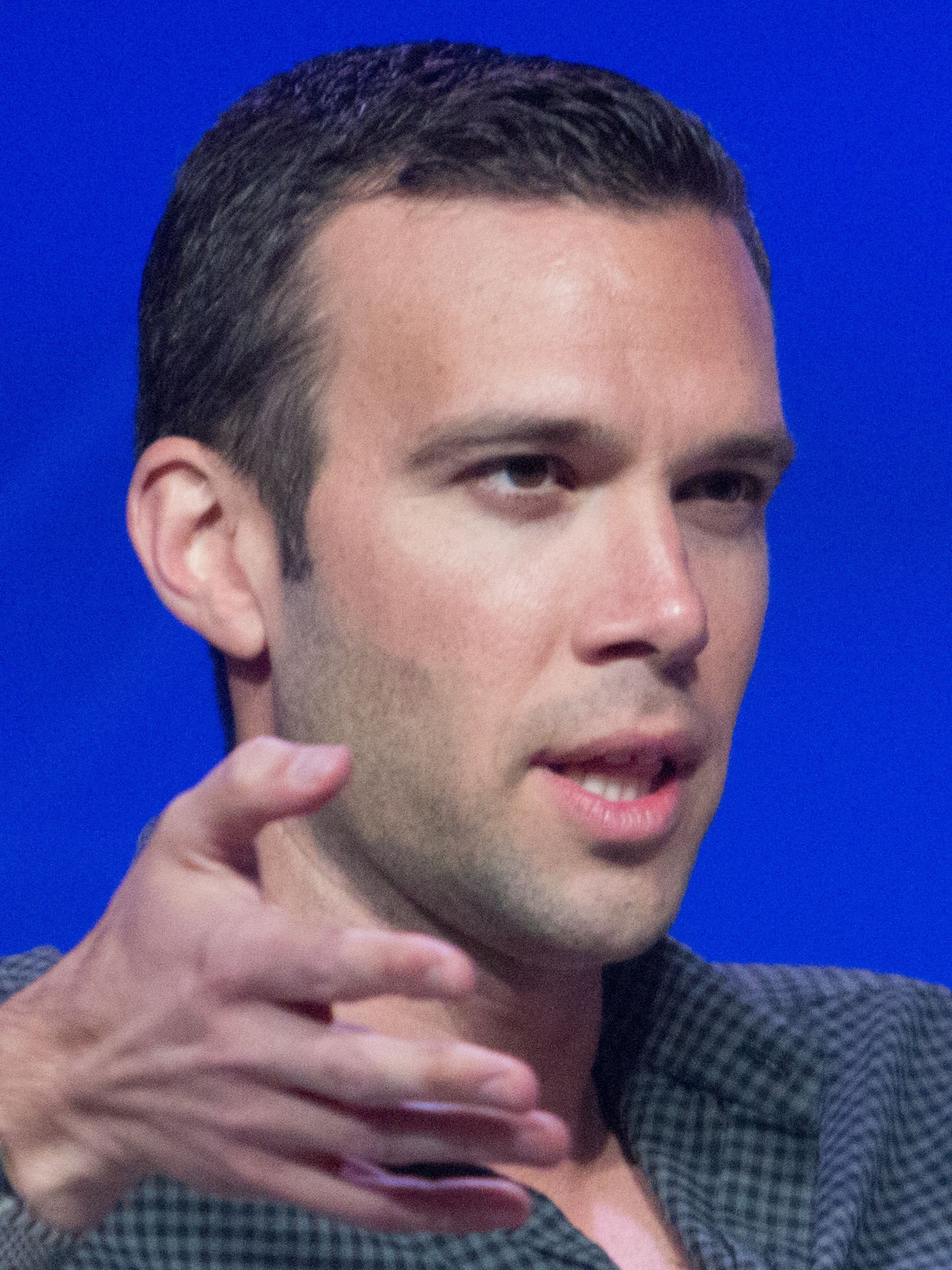
Jon Favreau,
White House Director of Speechwriting

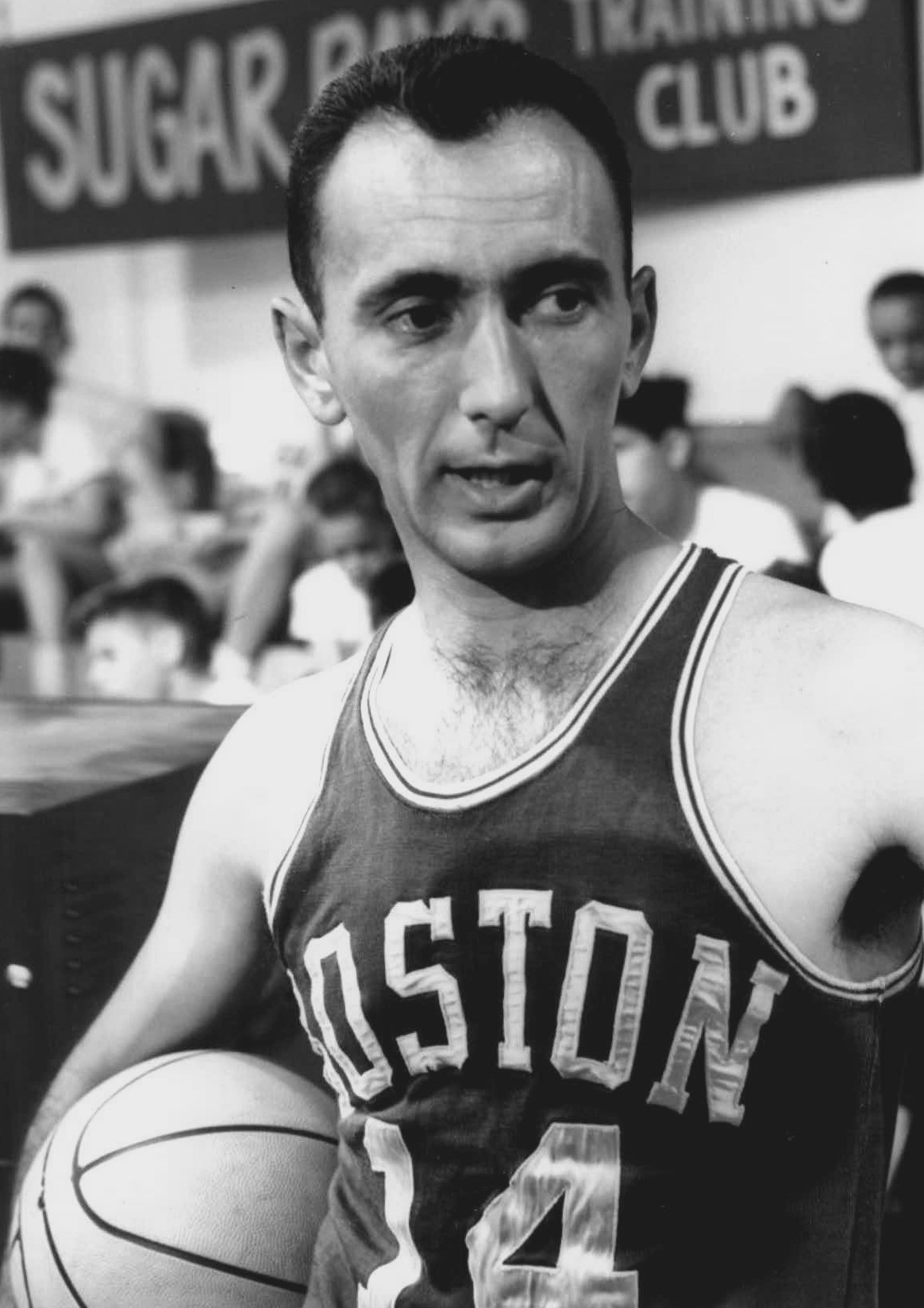
Bob Cousy,
13-time NBA All-Star and 1957 NBA Most Valuable Player

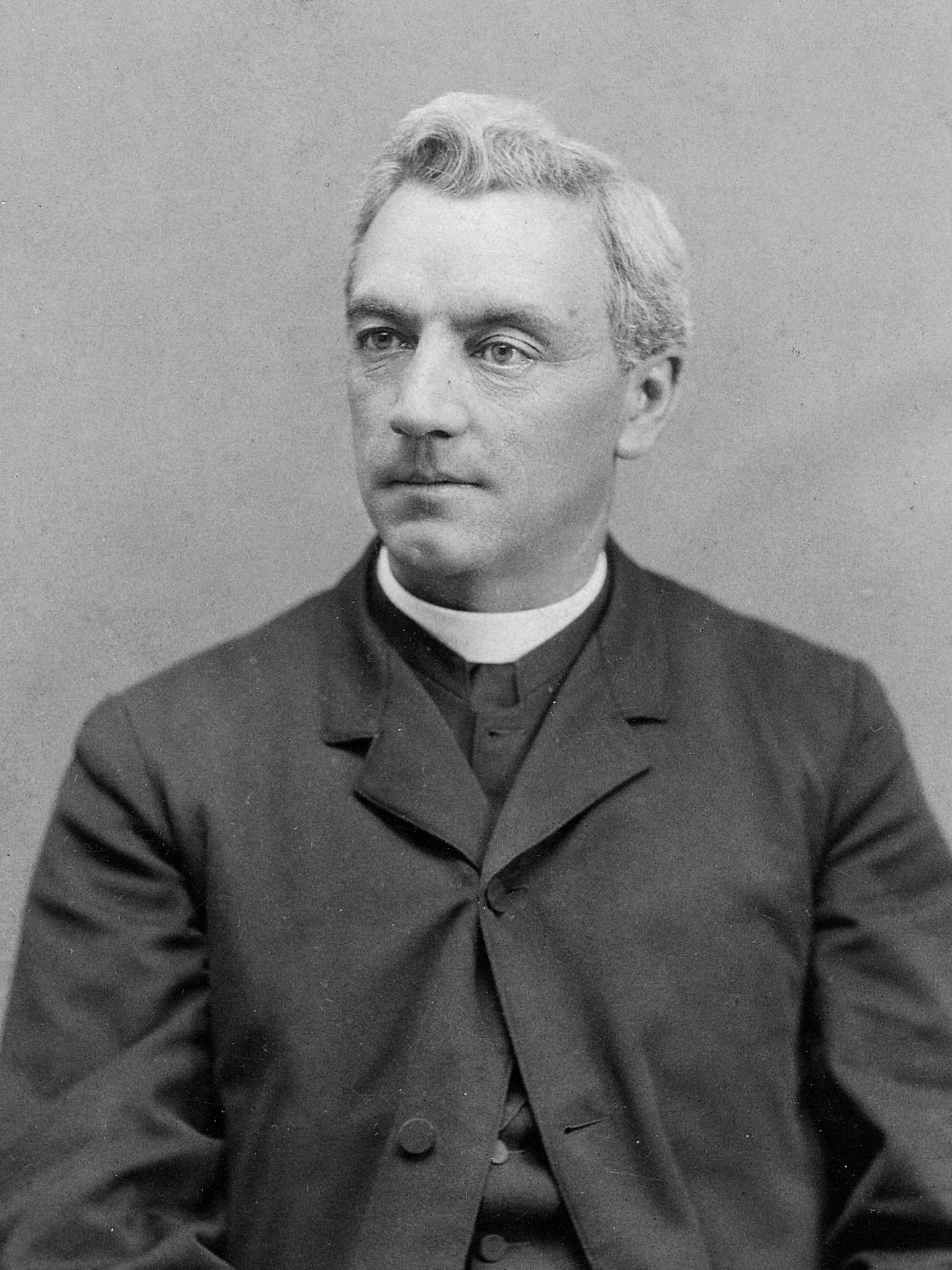
Patrick Francis Healy,
President of Georgetown University

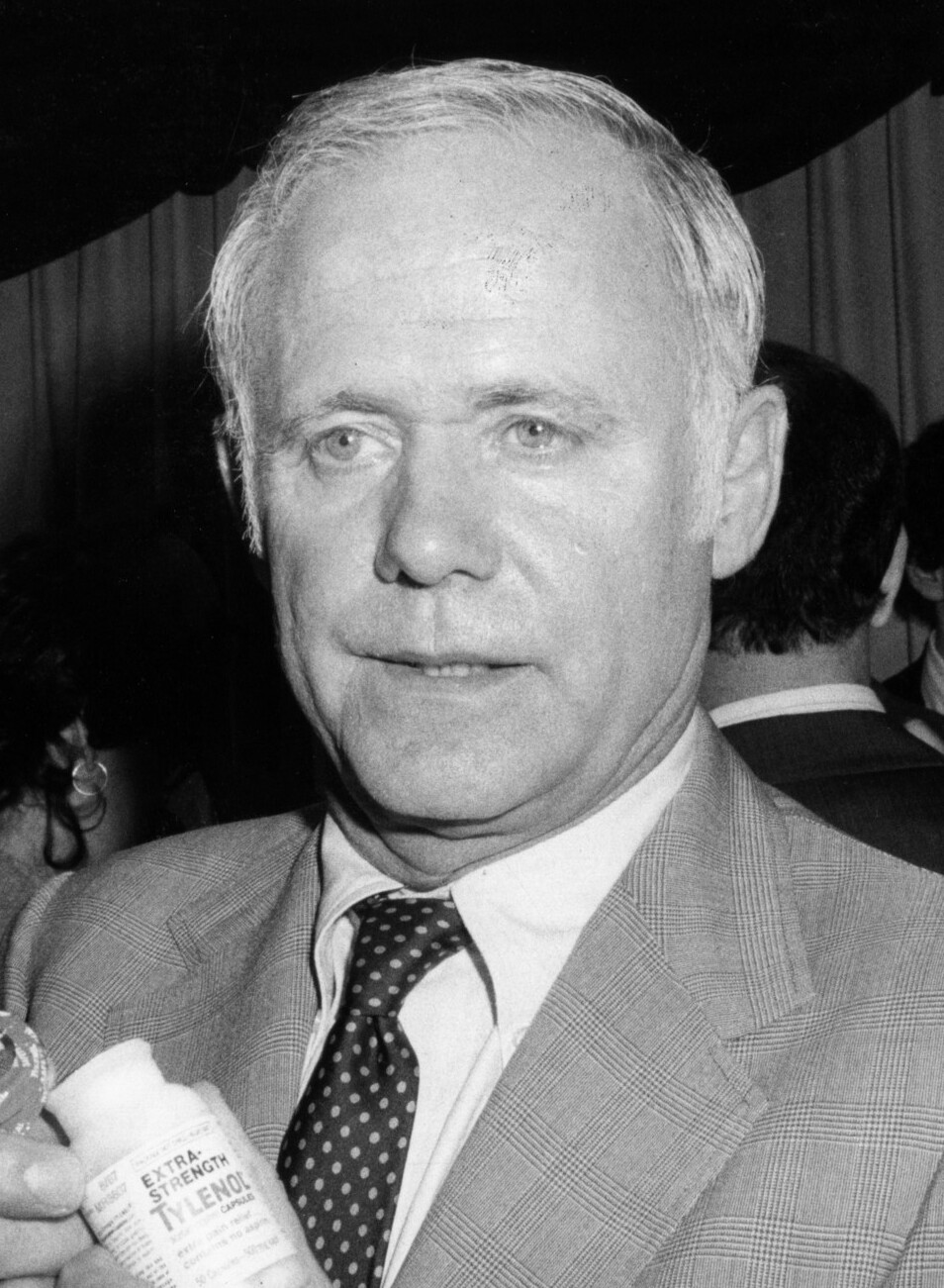
James E. Burke,
CEO of Johnson & Johnson

Holy Cross has more than 38,000 alumni, with more than 25 active alumni clubs in the U.S. and one international alumni club. Graduates of the college have become prominent in government and law, science and medicine, business, literature and the arts, media, and professional sports. Alumni are particularly overrepresented in the U.S. Congress, where Holy Cross has one of the highest ratios of members of Congress to students, according to Roll Call. Notable graduates include recipients of Emmy, Grammy, Academy, and Tony awards; 5 Rhodes Scholars, 5 Marshall Scholars, 6 Truman Scholars, Goldwater Scholars and Watson Fellows; Pulitzer Prize winners, a Nobel Prize laureate, U.S. Senators, and Olympic athletes. The college is a top producer of Fulbright scholars, having graduated 182 grantees.

=== Government and politics ===
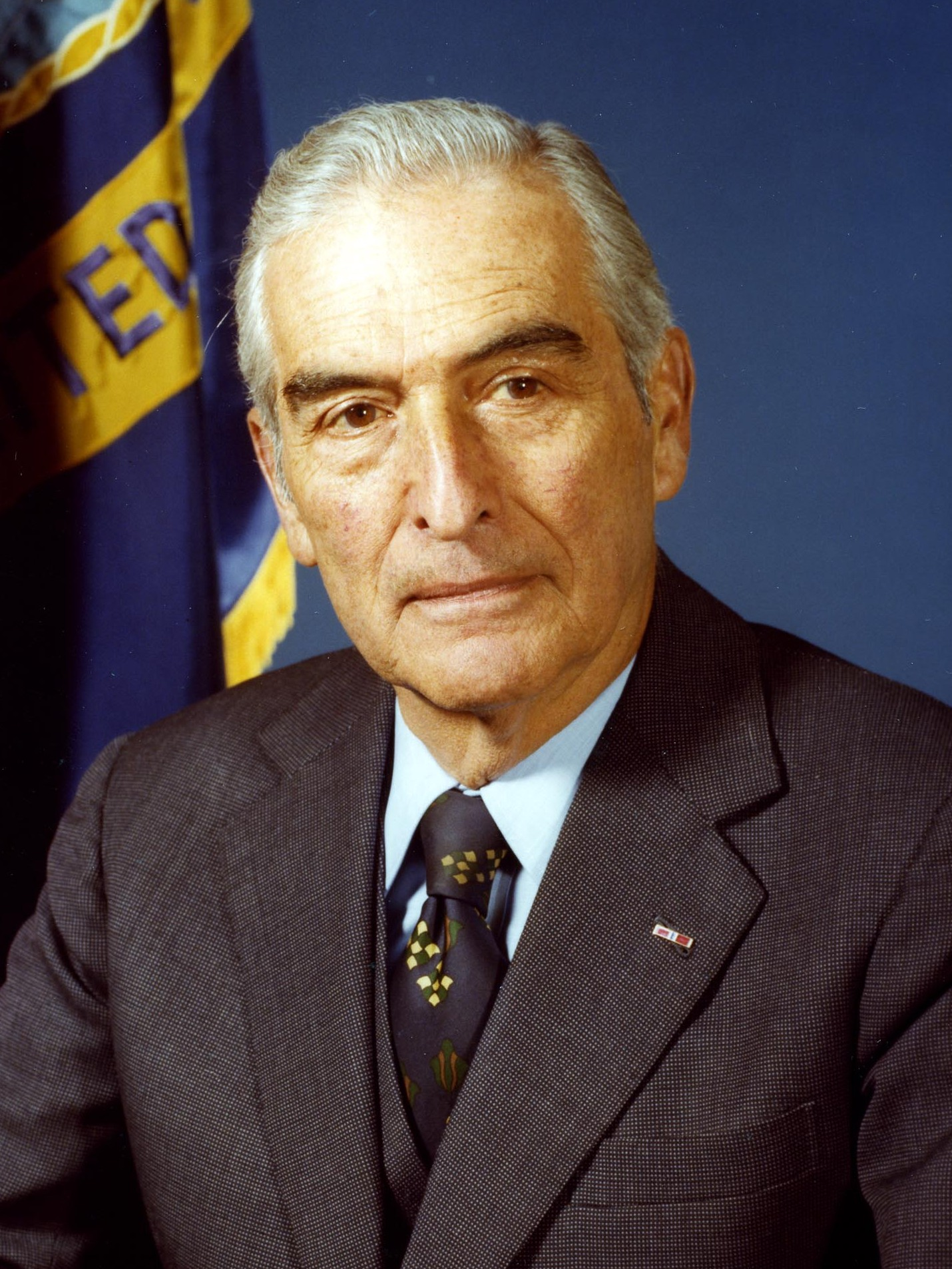
Edward Hidalgo was the first Hispanic to serve as U.S. Secretary of the Navy

In government and politics, graduates of the college include U.S. Supreme Court Justice Clarence Thomas (1971), who has served since 1991 and is the second-longest serving U.S. Supreme Court justice in history.

As of 2026, the college has produced six United States Senators: Bob Casey Jr. (1982) from Pennsylvania, Peter Welch (1969) from Vermont, John A. Durkin (1959) from New Hampshire, Maurice J. Murphy Jr. (1950) from New Hampshire, Thomas A. Burke (1920) from Ohio, and David I. Walsh (1893) from Massachusetts; and thirteen U.S. Representatives: Mark DeSaulnier (1974) from California, James B. Longley Jr. (1974) from Maine, Tim Bishop (1972) from New York, Welch, Michael McNulty (1969) from New York, Jim Moran (1967) from Virginia, Lawrence J. DeNardis (1960) from Connecticut, Durkin, Joseph D. Early (1955) from Massachusetts, Martin B. McKneally (1936) from New York, James A. Wright (1923) from Pennsylvania, Frank William Towey Jr. (1916) from New Jersey, and Ambrose Kennedy (1897) from Rhode Island.

International alumni in government service outside of the U.S. include Canadian statesman Louis-Rodrigue Masson, who served in the Canadian House of Commons and Senate and as Lieutenant Governor of Quebec; French-Canadian politician Henri Bourassa; and Polish politician Jarosław Wałęsa (2001), who served in both the Sejm and the European Parliament.

=== Science and medicine ===
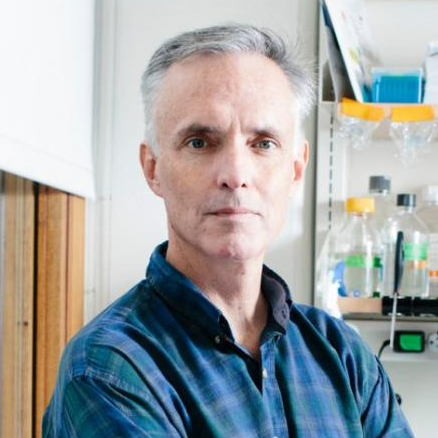
James J. Collins is one of the founders of synthetic biology

Holy Cross graduates in science and medicine include Anthony Fauci (1962), director of the National Institute of Allergy and Infectious Diseases; Joseph P. Kerwin (1953), NASA astronaut and the first American physician to travel to space; and surgeon Joseph Murray (1940), winner of the 1990 Nobel Prize in Physiology or Medicine for performing the first successful organ transplant. In academia, science graduates include biologist James J. Collins (1987), the Termeer Professor of Medical Engineering & Science at the Massachusetts Institute of Technology (MIT); and infectious-disease physician Helen Boucher (1986), dean of the Tufts University School of Medicine. Oncologist C. Gordon Zubrod (1936) served as scientific director of the National Cancer Institute, and physiologist James A. Shannon (1925) served as director of the National Institutes of Health.

=== Business, arts, and media ===
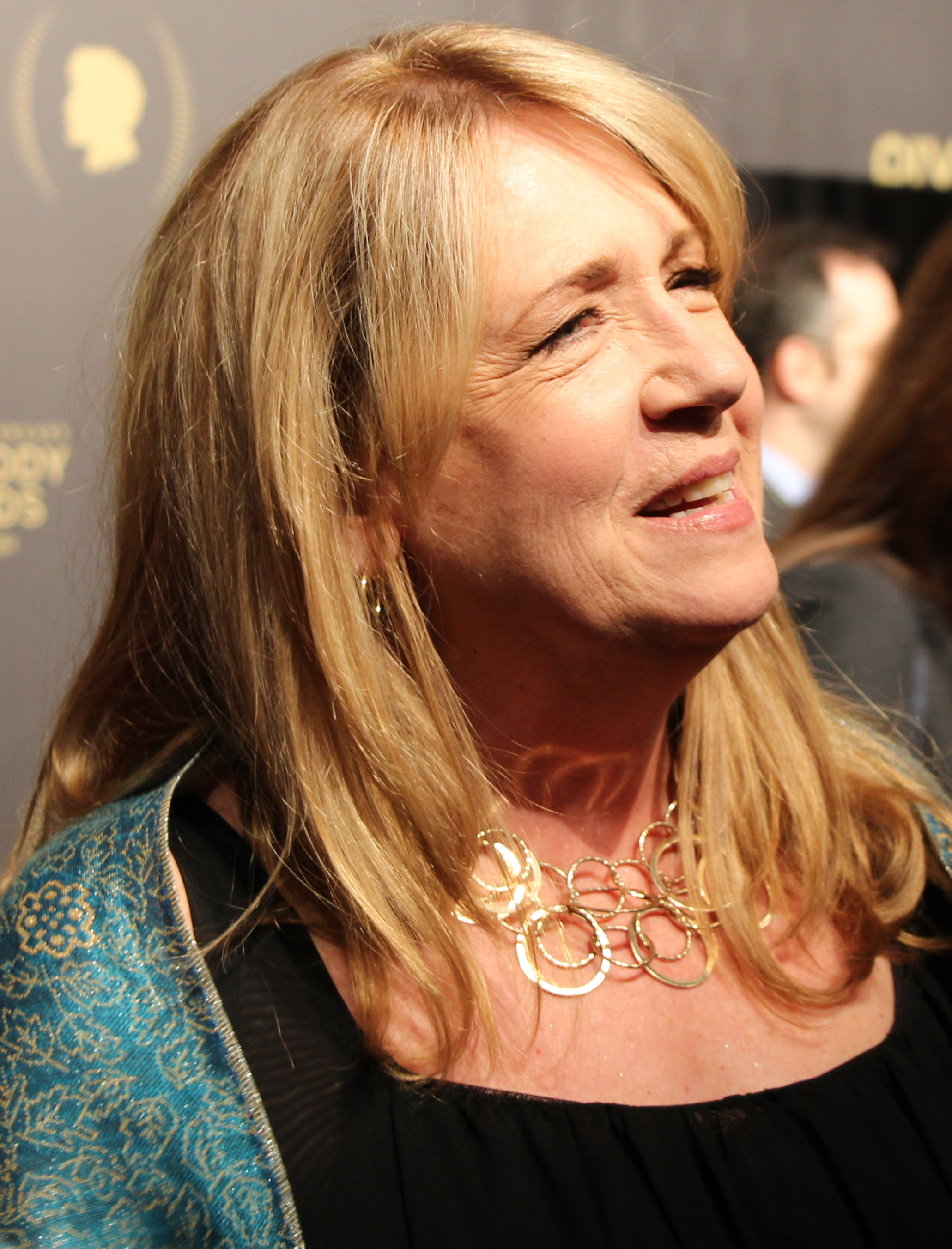
Actress Ann Dowd won an Emmy Award for her role in The Handmaid's Tale

In business, finance, and economics, graduates include James E. Burke (1947), CEO of Johnson & Johnson; J. D. Power III (1953), founder of J.D. Power; Bob Wright (1965), CEO of NBCUniversal; Theodore V. Wells, Jr. (1972), litigation co-chair of Paul, Weiss and member of the Harvard Corporation; James W. Keyes (1977), CEO of 7-Eleven and Blockbuster; and Joanna Geraghty (1994), CEO of JetBlue.

In literature, Billy Collins (1963) served as U.S. poet laureate from 2001 to 2003, while novelist Edward P. Jones (1972) received the Pulitzer Prize for Fiction. Alumni in the performing arts include Ann Dowd (1978), who received a Primetime Emmy Award for her performance in The Handmaid's Tale, and theater director Bartlett Sher (1981), who won the Tony Award for Best Direction of a Musical in 2008.

Media alumni include television journalist Chris Matthews (1967), host of MSNBC's Hardball, and sportswriter Bill Simmons (1992), founder of the sports and culture website The Ringer.

=== Athletics ===
Holy Cross has produced several members of major sports halls of fame. Basketball player Bob Cousy (1950) helped lead Holy Cross to the 1947 NCAA championship before winning six NBA championships with the Boston Celtics; he was inducted into the Naismith Memorial Basketball Hall of Fame in 1971. Fellow alumnus Tom Heinsohn (1956) led Holy Cross to the 1954 National Invitation Tournament championship and later won eight NBA championships as a Celtics player and two more as the team's head coach; he was inducted into the Basketball Hall of Fame as both a player and a coach. Football player Gordie Lockbaum, who played both offense and defense for Holy Cross from 1984 to 1987 and finished third in voting for the Heisman Trophy in 1987, was inducted into the College Football Hall of Fame in 2001.

== See also ==
- List of Jesuit sites
- List of presidents of the College of the Holy Cross
- National Register of Historic Places listings in eastern Worcester, Massachusetts

== Sources ==
- Historical Sketch of the College of the Holy Cross. Hamilton. 1883. OCLC 813002942. Archived from the original on December 16, 2018.
- Meagher, Walter J. (1944). History of the College of the Holy Cross, 1843-1901 (PhD Dissertation). Fordham University Press.
- Power, Edward J. (March 1955). "The Formative Years of Catholic Colleges Founded Before 1850 and Still in Existence as Colleges or Universities". Records of the American Catholic Historical Society of Philadelphia. 66 (1): 19–34. JSTOR 44210362.
- Meagher, Walter J.; Grattan, William J. (1966). The Spires of Fenwick: A History of the College of the Holy Cross, 1843-1963. New York: Vantage Press. ASIN B003L1K1XQ.
- Kuzniewski, Anthony J. (1999). Thy Honored Name: A History of the College of the Holy Cross, 1843–1994. Washington, D.C.: Catholic University of America Press. ISBN 978-0-81320-911-1. Archived from the original on December 15, 2018.
- Gleason, Philip (January 2008). "From an Indefinite Homogeneity: Catholic Colleges in Antebellum America". The Catholic Historical Review. 94 (1). Catholic University of America Press: 45–74. doi:10.1353/cat.2008.0047. JSTOR 25166919. S2CID 144486743.
- Brady, Diane (January 3, 2012). Fraternity. Spiegel & Grau. ISBN 978-0385524742.
- Yale Daily News (July 1, 2014). Mosely, Connor; Tran, Matthew (eds.). The Insider's Guide to the Colleges (41st ed.). New York: St. Martin's Press. ISBN 978-1-4668-4835-1.
- McGreevy, John T. (May 24, 2016). American Jesuits and the World. Princeton University Press. doi:10.1515/9781400882847. ISBN 9781400882847.
- Fiske, Edward B. (June 15, 2019). Fiske Guide to Colleges 2020 (36th ed.). Naperville, Illinois: Sourcebooks. ISBN 978-1492664949.
- "One Hundred and Seventy-Fifth Commencement". College of the Holy Cross. May 21, 2021 – via Issuu.
