= Nativism =

Nativism may refer to:

- Nativism (politics), ethnocentric beliefs relating to immigration and nationalism
- Nativism (psychology), a concept in psychology and philosophy which asserts certain concepts are "native" or in the brain at birth
- Linguistic nativism, a theory that grammar is largely hard-wired into the brain
- Innatism, the philosophical position that minds are born with knowledge
- Native religion, ethnic or regional religious customs

== See also ==
- Kokugaku or Japanese nativism, a school of Japanese philosophy that rejected Chinese texts in favor of early Japanese ones
