= Michael Kaufman =

Michael Kaufman or Kauffman may refer to:

== People ==
- Michael Kaufman (writer), promoter of the White Ribbon Campaign
- Michael T. Kaufman (1938–2010), writer for the New York Times
- Michael J. Kaufman, dean and law professor at Santa Clara University School of Law
- Michael Kauffmann (born 1931), art historian
- Michael Kaufmann (politician), German politician
- Michael M. Kaufmann (1891–1949), Chicago businessman
- Micha Kaufman (sport shooter), a sport shooter
- Micha Kaufman, co-founder and CEO of Fiverr

== Fictional characters ==
- Michael Kaufmann (Silent Hill), in the video game series Silent Hill

== See also ==
- Michael Kofman, American military analyst
