= Alpha Sigma Nu =

Honor society at Jesuit universities

- ΑΣΝ
- Founded: June 4, 1915; 111 years ago Marquette University
- Type: Honor
- Affiliation: ACHS
- Status: Active
- Emphasis: Jesuit colleges and universities
- Scope: International
- Motto: Adelphotes Scholastikon Nikephoron "Company of Honor Students"
- Colors: Maroon and Gold
- Publication: ΑΣΝ Newsletters
- Chapters: 32
- Members: ~90,000 lifetime
- Headquarters: 707 N. 11th Street #330; P.O. Box 1881; Milwaukee, Wisconsin 53201-1881; United States
- Website: www.alphasigmanu.org

Alpha Sigma Nu (ΑΣΝ) is the honor society of Jesuit colleges and universities. Founded in 1915 at Marquette University as Alpha Sigma Tau, it adopted the current name in 1930. The society is open to both men and women of every academic discipline in the Association of Jesuit Colleges and Universities and other Jesuit higher education institutions worldwide. It is present in 32 Jesuit institutions of higher education, 27 of which are in the United States. Alpha Sigma Nu currently has over 90,000 lifetime members and admits around 2,000 new members each year. It is a member of the Association of College Honor Societies.

== History ==
In 1915, the original society, Alpha Sigma Tau was founded by Father John Danihy, S.J. He was the dean of journalism at Marquette University in Milwaukee, Wisconsin. He sought to emulate the various honor societies present in the country. Furthermore, Catholic higher education institutes found their students being overlooked in other honor societies at the time.

In 1921, a second chapter was founded in Creighton University in Nebraska, United States. In 1925, a women-only society, Gamma Pi Epsilon, was founded. It had the same purpose as Alpha Sigma Nu, but the two societies remained independent. In 1930, Alpha Sigma Tau became Alpha Sigma Nu. On March 30, 1973, Alpha Sigma Nu and Gamma Pi Epsilon merged. Alpha Sigma Nu is an honor society for Jesuit institutions of higher education and recognizes students for scholarship, loyalty and service.

Alpha Sigma Nu joined the Association of College Honor Societies in 1975. By 2012, the society had 31 active chapters, 14 alumni clubs, 3,100 annual members, and 72,000 initiates. As of 2016, the society has 32 chapters: 27 at Jesuit colleges and universities in the United States, two in Canada, and one in South Korea, Spain, and Peru.

Alpha Sigma Nu currently has over 90,000 lifetime members and admits around 2,000 new members each year. Its national headquarters is at 707 N. 11th Street in Milwaukee, Wisconsin.

== Symbols ==
The Greek letters Alpha Sigma Nu stand for the motto Adelphotes Scholastikon Nikephor or "Company of Honor Students".

The society's key bears the three Greek letters ΑΣΝ with the eye of wisdom. Its colors are maroon and gold, selected because these colors are used on the family seal of St. Ignatius of Loyola, the founder of the Jesuits.

The society's publication is ΑΣΝ Newsletter.

== Activities ==
In 1979, Alpha Sigma Nu created the Alpha Sigma Nu Jesuit Book Awards. The annual awards recognize publishing achievements of faculty and administrators of at Jesuit colleges and universities in the categories of the humanities, the sciences, and professional studies. Some chapters present lectures, provide tutoring, or assistant with convocations.

== Membership ==
Membership is open to juniors, seniors, and graduate students who are in the top fifteen percent of their class and show service and loyalty to Jesuit ideals in higher education. No more than four percent of a given class may be offered membership.

== Chapters ==
These chapters were given charters as follows:

Chapter and institution	Charter date and range	Location	Status	Ref.
Marquette University	June 4, 1915	Milwaukee, Wisconsin	Active	
Creighton University	1921	Omaha, Nebraska	Active	
Saint Louis University	1923	St. Louis, Missouri	Active	
University of Detroit Mercy	1924	Detroit, Michigan	Active	
University of San Francisco	1924	San Francisco, California	Active	
Loyola University New Orleans	1936	New Orleans, Louisiana	Active	
Spring Hill College	1937	Mobile, Alabama	Active	
Loyola University Chicago	1938	Chicago, Illinois	Active	
Boston College	April 1939 -?; 2023	Chestnut Hill, Massachusetts	Active	
Gonzaga University	1939	Spokane, Washington	Active	
John Carroll University	1939	University Heights, Ohio	Active	
Loyola Marymount University	1939	Los Angeles, California	Active	
Saint Joseph's University	1939	Lower Merion Township, Pennsylvania	Active	
Xavier University	1939	Cincinnati, Ohio	Active	
College of the Holy Cross	1940	Worcester, Massachusetts	Active	
Seattle University	1940	Seattle, Washington	Active	
Loyola University Maryland	1942	Baltimore, Maryland	Active	
Santa Clara University	1942	Santa Clara, California	Active	
University of Scranton	1943	Scranton, Pennsylvania	Active	
Georgetown University	1950	Washington, D.C.	Active	
Le Moyne College	1951	DeWitt, New York	Active	
Rockhurst University	1953	Kansas City, Missouri	Active	
Canisius University	1955	Buffalo, New York	Active	
Wheeling University	1959-2019	Wheeling, West Virginia	Inactive	
Fairfield University	1961	Fairfield, Connecticut	Active	
Regis University	1966	Denver, Colorado	Active	
Saint Peter's University	1967	Jersey City, New Jersey	Active	
Sogang University	1975	Seoul, South Korea	Active	
Fordham University	1982	New York City, New York	Active	
Jesuit School of Theology	1993–2009	Berkeley, California	Consolidated	(Note: Chapter consolidated with the chapter at Santa Clara University in 2009.)
Weston Jesuit School of Theology	1993–2008	Cambridge, Massachusetts	Consolidated	(Note: Chapter formed from Boston College. It re-affiliated with Boston College in 2008.)
Regis College	2000	Toronto, Ontario, Canada	Active	
Campion College	2005	Regina, Saskatchewan, Canada	Active	
Loyola University Andalusia	2016	Córdoba, Andalusia, Spain	Active	
Universidad del Pacifico	2020	Lima, Peru	Active	
St. John's College, Belize	2026	Belize City, Belize	Active	

== Notable members ==
- J. Philip Calabrese, judge of the United States District Court for the Northern District of Ohio
- Timothy Creamer, NASA flight director and astronaut
- John Demers, United States Assistant Attorney General for the National Security Division
- Paul Elward, Illinois House of Representatives
- Chester Gillis, dean of Georgetown College
- Michael W. Higgins, interim principal of St. Mark's College and president of Corpus Christi College
- Joseph John Issa, businessman
- Robert Kaske, medieval literature professor at Cornell University
- Michael J. Kaufman, dean and professor at Santa Clara University School of Law.
- Brett Kissela, vascular neurologist
- Frank Lazarus, president of the University of Dallas
- Mark Maybury, Chief Scientist of the United States Air Force
- Ralph Metcalfe, U.S. House of Representatives and Olympian
- Kelsey Neumann, professional ice hockey player
- Phil Olsen, professional football player
- Joseph A. Panuska, president of the University of Scranton
- Mary Rakow, novelist
- Clarence Thomas, US Supreme Court justice
- Ellen Umansky, professor of Judaic Studies and Director of the Bennett Center for Judaic Studies at Fairfield University
- Mary Alice Williams, news anchor
- Dr. Anthony S. Fauci, M.D., physician

== See also ==
- Association of Jesuit Colleges and Universities
- Honor cords
- Honor society
- List of Jesuit educational institutions
