= Michael C. McFarland =

American academic administrator (born 1948)

The Reverend Michael C. McFarland

31st President of the College of the Holy Cross
- In office July 1, 2000 – January 9, 2012
- Preceded by: Frank Vellaccio (acting)
- Succeeded by: Rev. Phillip L. Boroughs, S.J.

Personal details
- Born: 1948 (age 77–78) Boston, Massachusetts, U.S.
- Education: Cornell University (BS); Carnegie Mellon University (MS, PhD); Boston College (MDiv, ThM)

Michael C. McFarland SJ (born 1948) is an American engineer and Jesuit who was the 31st president of the College of the Holy Cross in Worcester, Massachusetts. He succeeded Acting President Frank Vellaccio on July 1, 2000, and was succeeded by Philip Boroughs.

McFarland is currently president of the Gregorian University Foundation, an organization that supports three Jesuit pontifical institutions: Pontifical Gregorian University, Pontifical Oriental Institute and Pontifical Biblical Institute. All three institutions are based in Rome, Italy, and the Biblical Institute has a presence in Jerusalem.

== Early life and education ==
McFarland was born in Boston, Massachusetts, in 1948. He was raised in Waltham, Massachusetts, and for a short time in California. He graduated from Cornell University with a Bachelor of Science in physics in 1969. He then earned his Master of Science in 1979 and his Ph.D. in 1981 in computer engineering from Carnegie Mellon University. McFarland joined the Jesuit order in 1975 and studied at the Weston School of Theology, where he earned an M.Div. and Th.M. in social ethics. He was ordained at the College of the Holy Cross in 1984.

== Career ==
McFarland previously worked for AT&T Bell Labs conducting research in computer-aided design of digital systems. Before going to Holy Cross, he was a computer science professor and the Dean of the College of Arts and Sciences at Gonzaga University.

=== President of the College of the Holy Cross ===
McFarland succeeded Acting Holy Cross President Frank Vellaccio on July 1, 2000.

In February 2011, he announced his intention to step down from office. McFarland was succeeded in office by Rev. Philip Boroughs, S.J., who was unanimously elected as the 32nd President of Holy Cross by the board of trustees on May 6, 2011.

McFarland left office on January 9, 2012.

=== IEEE ===
McFarland has articles published in the Proceedings of the IEEE (the Institute of Electrical and Electronics Engineers), the IEEE Transactions on Computers, the IEEE Transactions on Computer-Aided Design of Integrated Circuits and Systems, Formal Methods for System Design, the Journal of Systems and Software, Computer, and Technology and Society. For three years he was an associate editor for the IEEE Transactions on Computer-Aided Design of Integrated Circuits and Systems and has participated in numerous program committees for conferences.

=== Board Memberships ===
In addition to his responsibilities as Holy Cross' president, McFarland serves on the following:

- The Board of Trustees of The Association of Jesuit Colleges and Universities
- The Board of Trustees of The University of Scranton in Scranton, Pennsylvania
- The Board of Trustees of Boston College High School
- The Board of Trustees of St. John's High School in Shrewsbury, Massachusetts
- The Board of Trustees of Worcester Catholic Charities
- The Board of Trustees of The Worcester Municipal Research Bureau
- The Board of Directors of the NCAA Division I
- The Advisory Council for PricewaterhouseCoopers
- Chairman of the Nativity School of Worcester, Massachusetts

Preceded by Rev. Gerard Reedy, S.J.	Presidents of College of the Holy Cross; 2000–2012	Succeeded by Rev. Philip L. Boroughs
