= Ellen Umansky =

American academic

Ellen M. Umansky
- Born: Brooklyn, New York, U.S.
- Education: Wellesley College (BA); Yale Divinity School (MA); Columbia University (MPhil, PhD)
- Occupations: Scholar, historian
- Employer: Fairfield University
- Known for: Modern Jewish history; Jewish women’s spirituality
- Title: Carl and Dorothy Bennett Professor of Judaic Studies

Dr. Ellen M. Umansky is an American scholar of modern Jewish history and religious thought, and a specialist in Jewish women’s spirituality.

== Early life and education ==
Umansky was born in Brooklyn, New York, and grew up in New Rochelle in a Reform Jewish family.

When she was a graduate student at Columbia University in the 1970s, the use of feminist methodology in academic research was often discouraged. Her decision to focus her doctoral dissertation on Lily Montagu, a prominent English Reform Jewish leader of the early twentieth century, was met with resistance, and she was advised to pursue a more conventional subject, such as a biography of a male figure or a study of Jewish institutional history. Despite this lack of institutional encouragement and limited support from her academic advisor, Umansky completed her dissertation on Montagu.

Umansky received her B.A. from Wellesley College; M.A. from the Yale Divinity School; and her M.Phil. and Ph.D. in religion from Columbia University in 1981.

== Career ==
Umansky taught at various institutions, including Emory University (1982-1986, Asst. Prof. of Religion;1987-1990, Associate Prof. of Religion) Haverford College (Margaret Gest Visiting Associate Professor of Religion, 1990–1991), Vassar College (Visiting Associate Professor of Religion spring, 1992) and Hebrew Union College-Jewish Institute of Religion, NYC (Adjunct Assoc. Prof., 1990–1994).

She served as the Carl and Dorothy Bennett Professor of Judaic Studies and Founding Director of the Bennett Center for Judaic Studies at Fairfield University located in Fairfield, Connecticut, from 1994 until 2022.

The author of five books and almost one hundred scholarly articles and encyclopedia articles on modern Jewish history and religious thought and/or Jewish women's spirituality, she is the 2009 recipient of Fairfield University's Dr. Martin Luther King Jr. Faculty Vision Award for her “effort to instill and inspire the teachings and ideals” of Dr. King and the 2012 recipient of the Fairfield University Alumni Association's Distinguished Faculty/Administrator Award for her “inspired teaching and service” to the university. Past President of the Southern Jewish Historical Society and chair of its nominations committee, she is a member of the board of directors of the Stimulus Foundation of Paulist Press, the Academic Advisory Board of the Jewish Women's Archive, and the Academic Council of the American Jewish Historical Society. She is a member of Phi Beta Kappa, Alpha Sigma Nu (the Jesuit Honor Society), and Theta Alpha Kappa (the national honors society in Religious studies and Theology).

== Bibliography ==
- Lily Montagu and the Advancement of Liberal Judaism: From Vision to Vocation (Studies in Women & Religion), (Edwin Mellen Press, December 1983)
- Lily Montagu: Sermons, Addresses, Letters and Prayers, ed. (Edwin Mellen Press, 1985)
- Four Centuries of Jewish Women's Spirituality: A Sourcebook, edited with D. Ashton (Beacon Press, 2004)
- Four Centuries of Jewish Women's Spirituality: A Sourcebook, Revised Edition, edited and with introductions by Ellen M. Umansky and Dianne Ashton (Brandeis University Press, 2009)
- From Christian Science to Jewish Science: Spiritual Healing and American Jews (Oxford University Press, USA, 2005)
