= Lisa A. Kloppenberg =

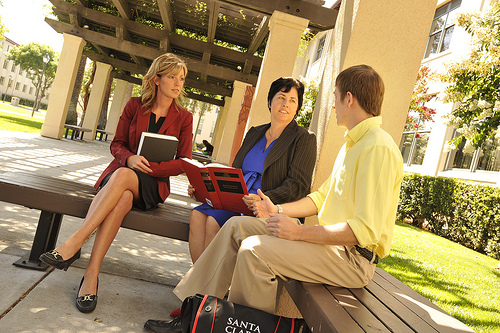
- Born: 1962 (age 63–64)
- Education: B.A., journalism and English, University of Southern California, 1984 (Phi Beta Kappa); University of Southern California Law School, 1987 (Order of the Coif)
- Occupations: Dean and Professor of Law
- Employer: Santa Clara University School of Law

Lisa A. Kloppenberg is the former Provost and former Interim President of Santa Clara University. She previously served as Dean of the Santa Clara University School of Law from 2013 until her tenure as Interim Provost beginning in 2019. She is the former Dean of the University of Dayton School of Law and taught at the University of Oregon School of Law from 1992 to 2001. Before becoming a law professor, she clerked for Judge Dorothy Wright Nelson of the 9th U.S. Circuit Court of Appeals and practiced law at Kaye Scholer in Washington, D.C.

She is an expert in Constitutional Law and Alternative Dispute Resolution (ADR), which she calls "Appropriate" Dispute Resolution. Some of her articles and books include Avoiding Constitutional Questions, Measured Constitutional Steps, the book Playing it Safe: How the Supreme Court Sidesteps Hard Cases and Stunts the Development of Law, and the casebook Resolving Disputes: Theory, Practice and Law.

In 2014, the Silicon Valley Business Journal named her a "Woman of Influence."
