= Kelsey Neumann =

American ice hockey player (born 1991)

- Born: May 7, 1991 (age 35) Torrance, California, U.S.
- Height: 5 ft 5 in (165 cm)
- Position: Goaltender
- NWHL team: Buffalo Beauts
- Playing career: 2016–present

Kelsey Neumann (born May 7, 1991) is an American professional ice hockey goaltender for the Buffalo Beauts of the National Women's Hockey League (NWHL).

== Career ==
Neumann briefly played collegiate women's ice hockey for Clarkson University and SUNY Plattsburgh in the NCAA. Before playing college hockey, Neumann played for the North American Hockey Academy for three years. She played in 150 games totaling 6630 minutes. Over her three years at NAHA, she achieved a career GAA of 1.16, a save percentage of .930, amassed 54 shutouts, and holds the program record for shutouts in a season. Was also in the net for two Assabet Tournament championships, two JWHL championships, and two Cornwall Typhoon tournament championships. Before NAHA, she was a member of the Madison Capitals Bantam AAA boys’ team that participated at Nationals.

Before joining the Buffalo Beauts, Neumann played for the USA Hockey National Bound, North Carolina Women's hockey team, winning 1 National title and 1 second place title. She finished in the top 5 goalies 4 of the 5 years the team played.

=== Professional ===
Neumann joined the practice squad for the Buffalo Beauts in the 2016/17 NWHL season. Neumann was the Buffalo Beauts recipient for the 2017 NWHL Foundation Award.

In June 2017, it was announced that she had signed a one-year contract to play for the Buffalo Beauts in the 2017/18 NWHL season.

Neumann returned to the Buffalo Beauts for the 2019–2020 season after a one-year hiatus.

== Personal life ==
Daughter of Cindi and Tracy Neumann. She was a member of the National Honor Society at the North American Hockey Academy. BA in communications, MS in Special Education and Elementary Education. Member of Alpha Sigma Nu Honor Society from Canisius College. Her older brother is currently serving as an Officer in the Army. Lists Vladislav Tretiak as her favorite athlete.
