= Philip Boroughs =

American academic administrator

The Reverend Philip L. Boroughs SJ

32nd President of the College of the Holy Cross
- In office January 9, 2012 – July 1, 2021
- Preceded by: Michael C. McFarland
- Succeeded by: Vincent Rougeau

Personal details
- Born: Vancouver, British Columbia, Canada
- Education: Gonzaga University (BA); Catholic Theological Union (MDiv); Jesuit School of Theology (LST); Graduate Theological Union (PhD)

Philip L. Boroughs SJ is an American Jesuit academic and university administrator who served as president of the College of the Holy Cross from 2012 to 2021. He was succeeded by Vincent Rougeau.

== Biography ==
=== Career ===
Boroughs has worked as an academic administrator and faculty member at both Gonzaga University and Seattle University.

=== V.P. of Georgetown University ===
In 2003, Boroughs was selected as the Vice President for Mission and Ministry at Georgetown University in Washington, D.C. Boroughs' responsibilities as vice president included fundraising, the creation of religious programs to serve the Georgetown community and the promotion of Georgetown University's Jesuit and Roman Catholic identities.

Under Boroughs, the renovations of Georgetown University's Dahlgren Chapel of the Sacred Heart were begun. The school also launched the construction project for the forthcoming Calcagnini Contemplative Center. Plans were also initiated to add Jewish, Muslim and Eastern religion worship spaces within Georgetown University's Leavey Center. Each of these projects was scheduled for completion after Boroughs left Georgetown to become President of the College of the Holy Cross.

=== President of the College of the Holy Cross ===
In February 2011, College of the Holy Cross President Rev. Michael C. McFarland, S.J., announced his intention to step down as president after more than eleven years as the head of the college. Holy Cross' thirty-five member board of trustees launched a nationwide search for a new president. Boroughs, who had previously served on Holy Cross' board for three years, applied for the position. According to a spokesperson for Holy Cross, Boroughs was the only candidate to visit the school's campus during the selection process.

Boroughs was unanimously elected as Holy Cross' incoming 32nd president by the board on May 6, 2011. He became president on January 9, 2012, upon McFarland's departure.

In September 2020, Boroughs announced his planned resignation effective June 30, 2021. On February 10, 2021, Holy Cross announced that it had selected Vincent D. Rougeau, Dean of the Boston College Law School, as its 33rd president. Rougeau is the first lay and first Black president in the history of the college.
