= Association of Jesuit Colleges and Universities =

Educational consortium of the Americas

The Association of Jesuit Colleges and Universities (AJCU) is a consortium of the 28 Jesuit colleges and universities and three theological centers in the United States, Canada, and Belize committed to advancing academic excellence by promoting and coordinating collaborative activities, sharing resources, and advocating and representing the work of Jesuit higher education at the national and international levels. It is headquartered in Washington, D.C., and led by the Association's president, Rev. Michael J. Garanzini, S.J.

Although each institution is legally autonomous under independent boards of trustees and separately chartered by respective states, the 28 schools and three theological schools share common Jesuit ideals and traditions. They also engage in a number of collaborative projects like the National Jesuit Student Leadership Conference (NJSLC) and other conferences.

== Members ==
University	Location	Founded	President	Enrollment	Endowment (in $MM)	Sports Team	School Colors
Boston College	Chestnut Hill, Massachusetts	1863	Fr. John T. Butler, S.J.	15,025	$3,778	Eagles (Division I)	Maroon & Gold
Canisius University	Buffalo, New York	1870	Steve K. Stoute	2,492	$147	Golden Griffins (Division I)	Blue & Gold
Creighton University	Omaha, Nebraska	1878	Fr. Daniel S. Hendrickson, SJ	7,730	$783	Bluejays (Division I)	Blue & White
Fairfield University	Fairfield, Connecticut	1942	Mark R. Nemec	5,192	$459	Stags (Division I)	Red & White
Fordham University	Bronx, New York	1841	Tania C. Tetlow	16,986	$1,025	Rams (Division I)	Maroon & White
Georgetown University	Washington, D.C.	1789	Eduardo Peñalver	17,130	$3,638	Hoyas (Division I)	Blue & Gray
Gonzaga University	Spokane, Washington	1887	Thayne M. McCulloh	7,874	$452	Bulldogs (Division I)	Blue & White
College of the Holy Cross	Worcester, Massachusetts	1843	Vincent D. Rougeau	3,197	$1,109	Crusaders (Division I)	Purple & White
John Carroll University	University Heights, Ohio	1886	Alan R. Miciak	3,726	$302.15	Blue Streaks (Division III)	Blue & Gold
Le Moyne College	Syracuse, New York	1946	Linda M. LeMura	3,301	$280	Dolphins (Division I)	Green & Gold
Loyola Marymount University	Los Angeles, California	1911	Thomas Poon	9,369	$723	Lions (Division I)	Crimson & Blue
Loyola University Chicago	Chicago, Illinois	1870	Mark C. Reed	16,040	$1,060	Ramblers (Division I)	Maroon & Gold
Loyola University Maryland	Baltimore, Maryland	1852	Terrence M. Sawyer	5,978	$324	Greyhounds (Division I)	Green & Gray
Loyola University New Orleans	New Orleans, Louisiana	1912	Xavier Cole	5,178	$244	Wolfpack (Division II)	Maroon & Gold
Marquette University	Milwaukee, Wisconsin	1881	Kimo Ah Yun	11,373	$997	Golden Eagles (Division I)	Blue & Gold
Regis University	Denver, Colorado	1877	Fr. John P. Fitzgibbons, SJ	9,722	$100.5	Rangers (Division II)	Blue & Gold
Rockhurst University	Kansas City, Missouri	1910	Sandra Cassady	3,000	$35	Hawks (Division II)	Blue & White
St. John's College	Belize City, Belize	1887	Mirtha Alice Peralta	2,267	unknown	n/a	Navy & White
Saint Joseph's University	Philadelphia, Pennsylvania	1851	Cheryl A. McConnell	8,800	$468	Hawks (Division I)	Crimson & Gray
Saint Peter's University	Jersey City, New Jersey	1872	Eugene J. Cornacchia	3,045	$31	Peacocks (Division I)	Blue & White
Saint Louis University	St. Louis, Missouri	1818	Edward J. Feser	13,981	$1,879	Billikens (Division I)	Blue & White
Santa Clara University	Santa Clara, California	1851	Julie Sullivan	9,178	$1,555	Broncos (Division I)	Red & White
Seattle University	Seattle, Washington	1891	Eduardo M. Peñalver	7,755	$318	Redhawks (Division I)	Scarlet & White
Spring Hill College	Mobile, Alabama	1830	Mary H. Van Brunt	1,500	$19	Badgers (Division II)	Purple & White
University of Detroit Mercy	Detroit, Michigan	1877	Donald B. Taylor	5,231	$109	Titans (Division I)	Navy Blue Red & White
University of San Francisco	San Francisco, California	1855	Salvador D. Aceves	9,212	$566	Dons (Division I)	Green & Gold
University of Scranton	Scranton, Pennsylvania	1888	Fr. Joseph G. Marina, SJ	6,034	$324	Royals (Division III)	Purple & White
Xavier University	Cincinnati, Ohio	1831	Colleen M. Hanycz	6,945	$300	Musketeers (Division I)	Blue , Grey , & White
Campion College (associate member)	Regina, Saskatchewan	1917	Fr. Sami Helewa, SJ	700			Scarlet
Newman College (associate member)	Melbourne, Australia	1918	Fr. Frank Brennan, SJ (Dean)	220			
Regis College (associate member)	Toronto, Ontario	1930	Fr. Gordon Rixon, SJ (President-Designate)				Gold , & Red

Note: In 2019, Wheeling Jesuit University became disaffiliated from the Maryland Province of the Society of Jesus.

== Gallery ==
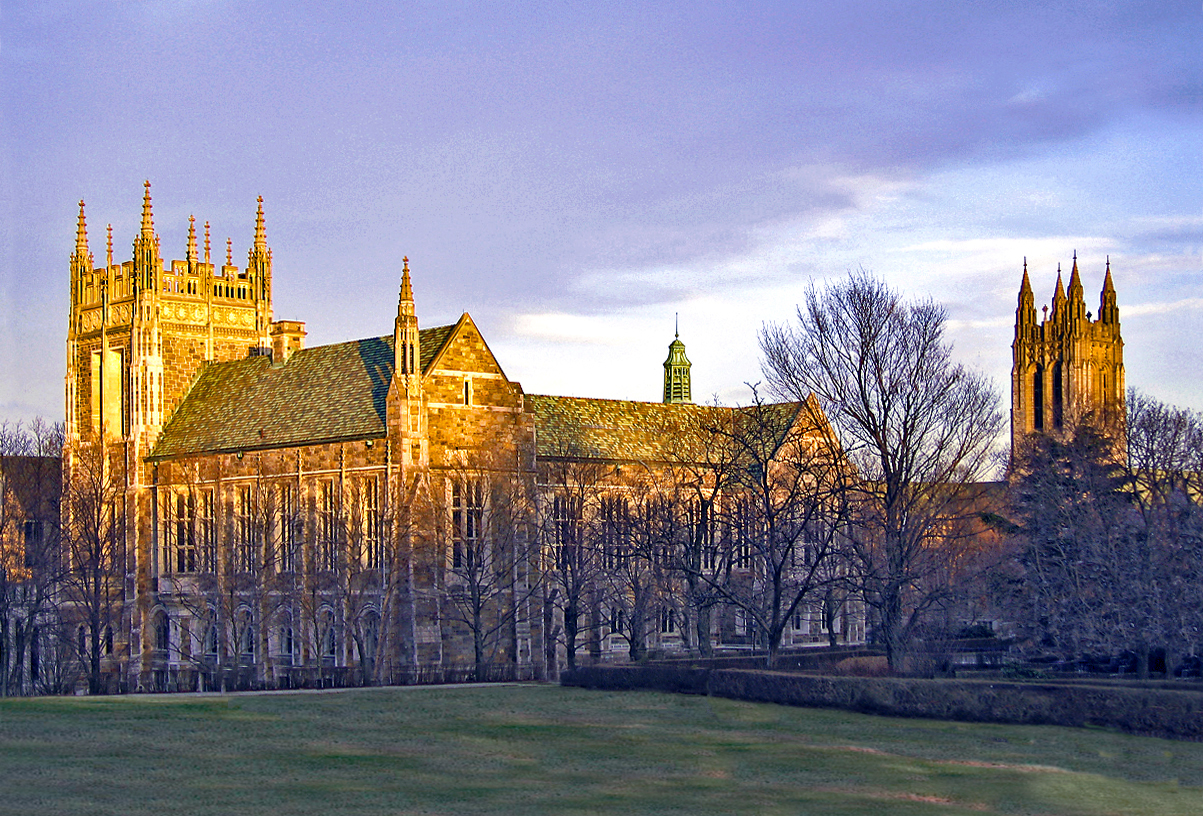
Boston College

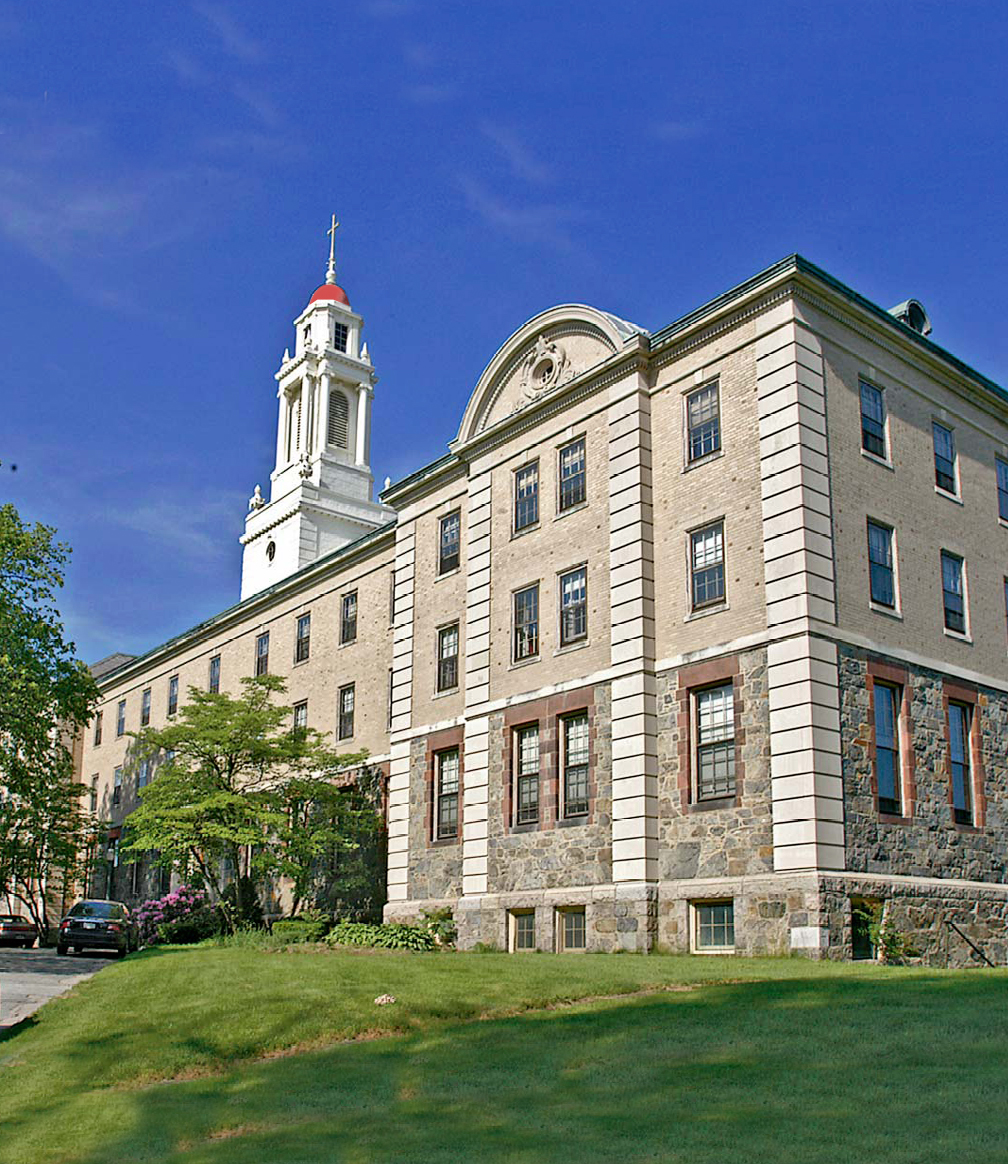
Boston College School of Theology and Ministry

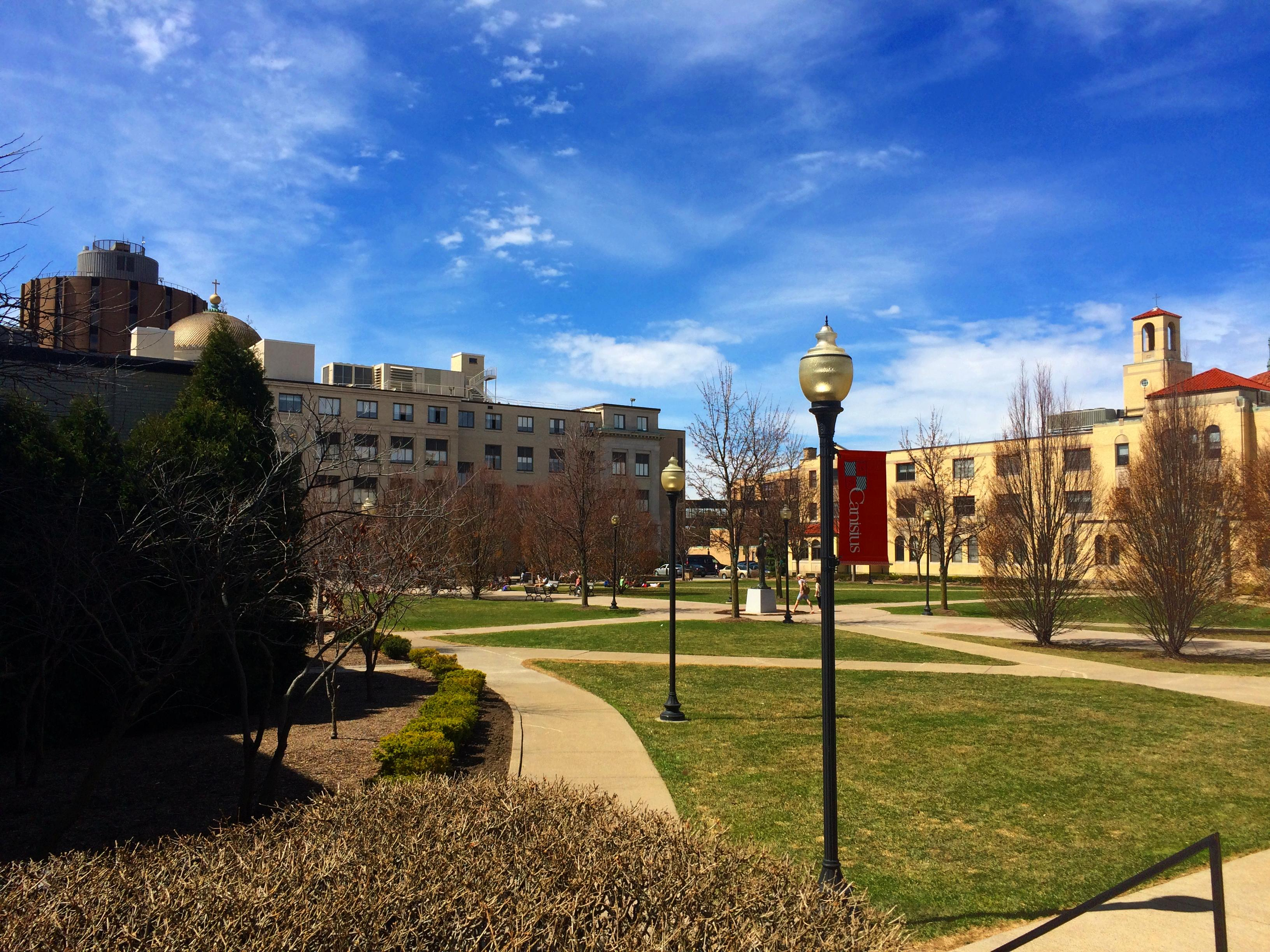
Canisius University

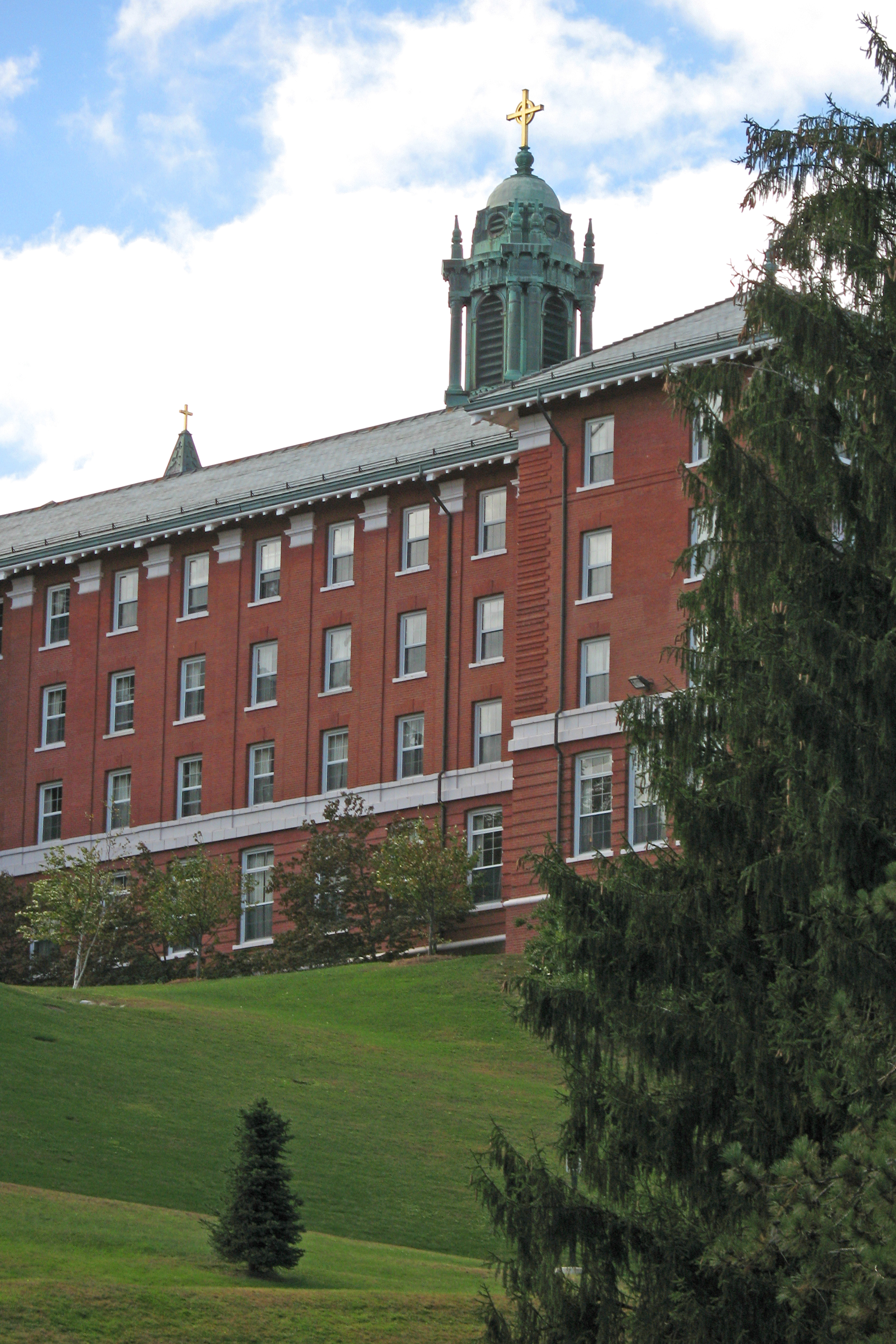
College of the Holy Cross

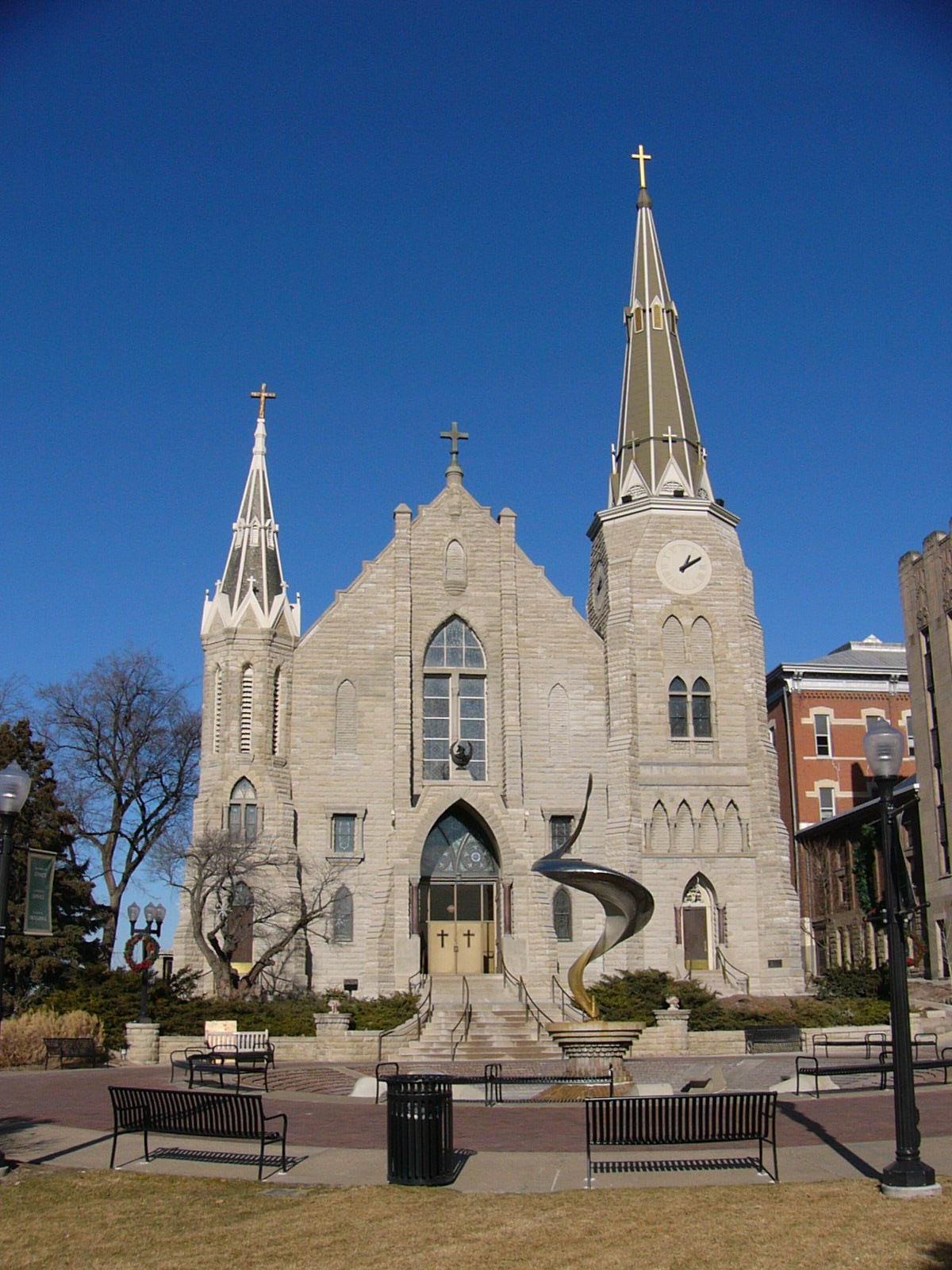
Creighton University

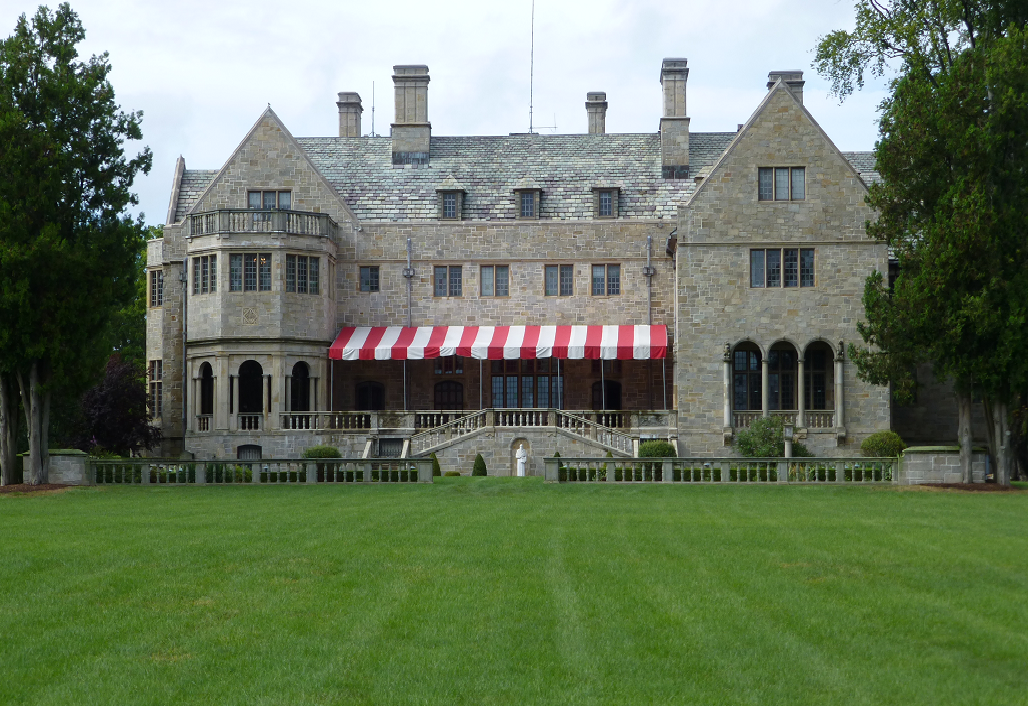
Fairfield University

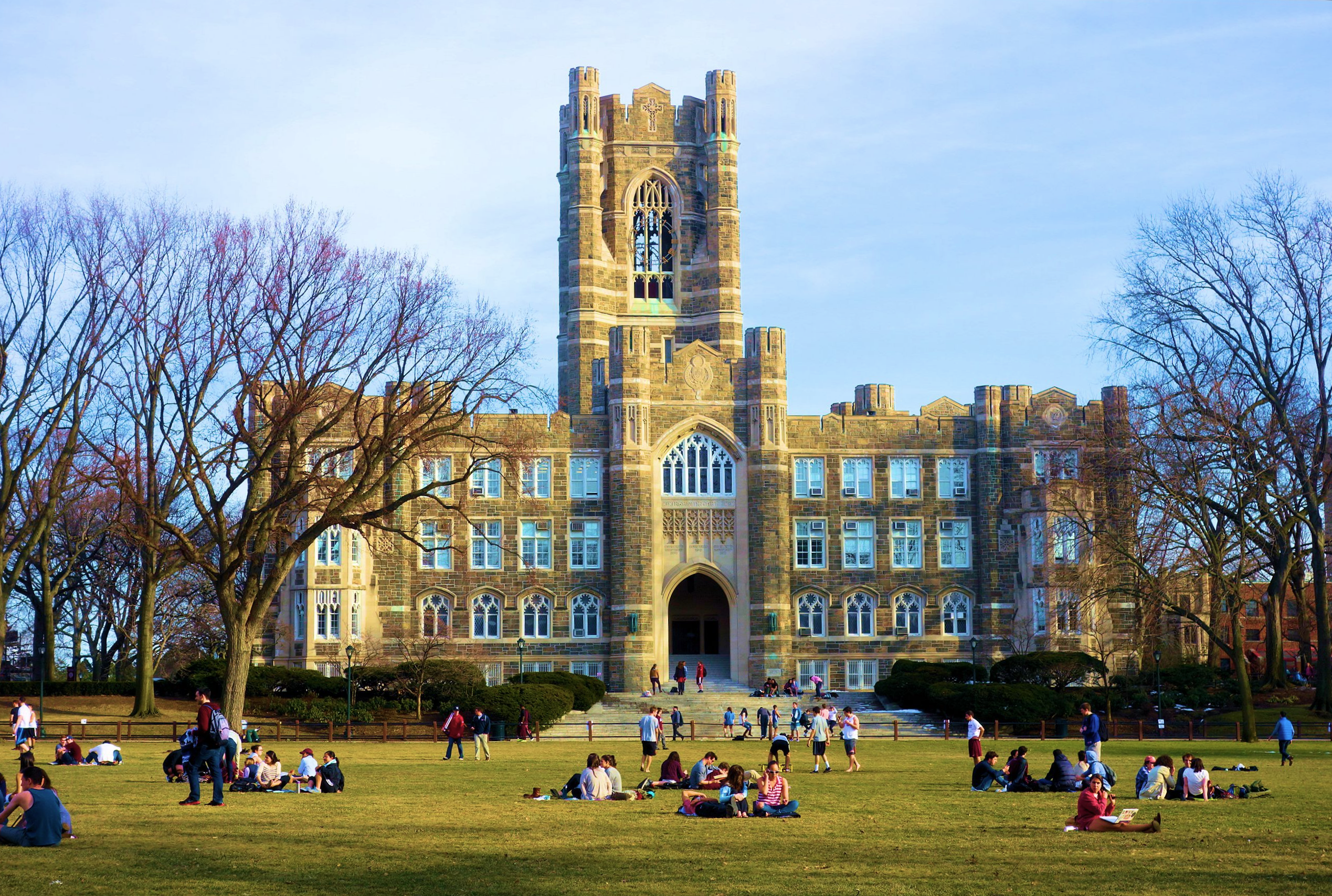
Fordham University

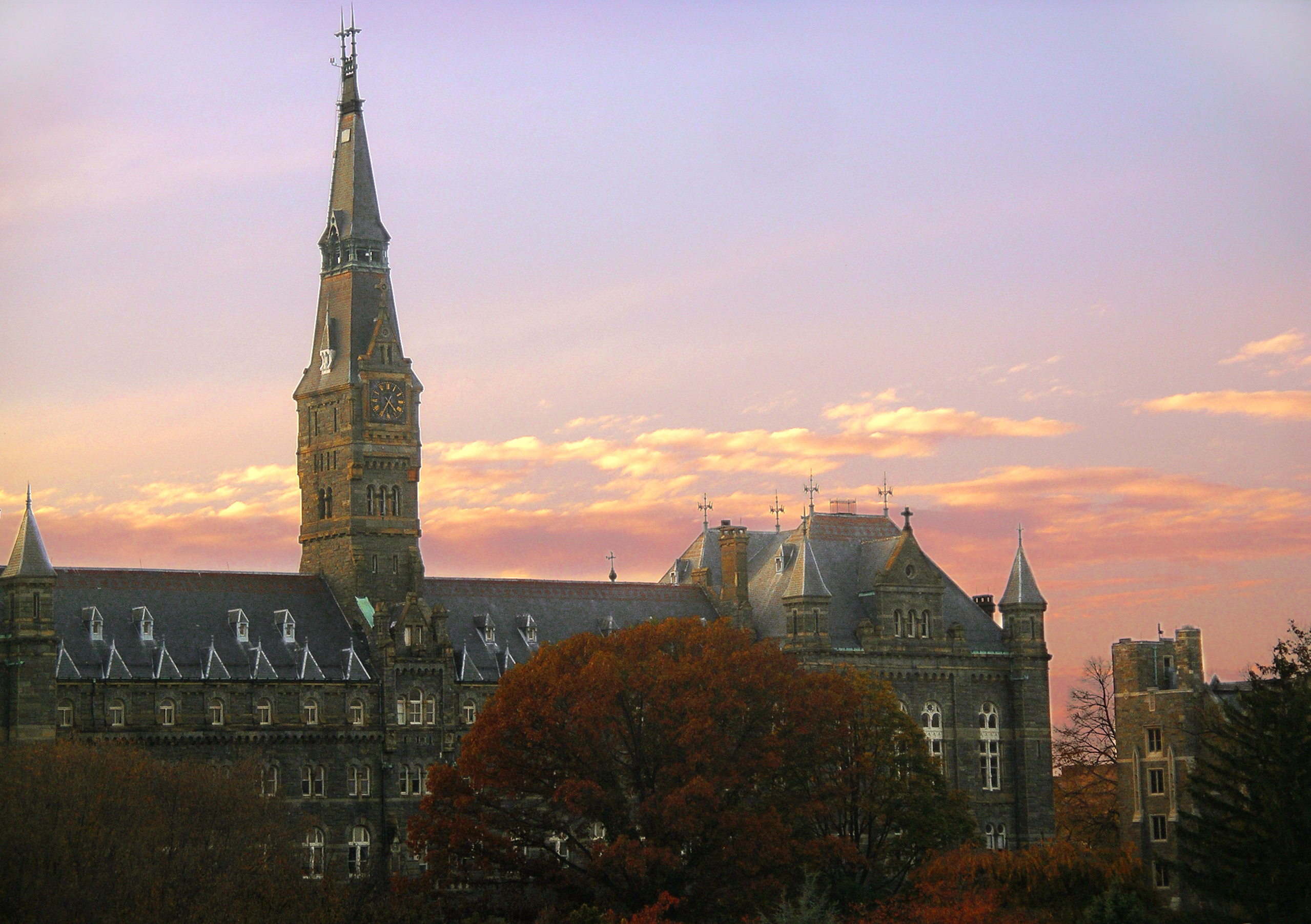
Georgetown University

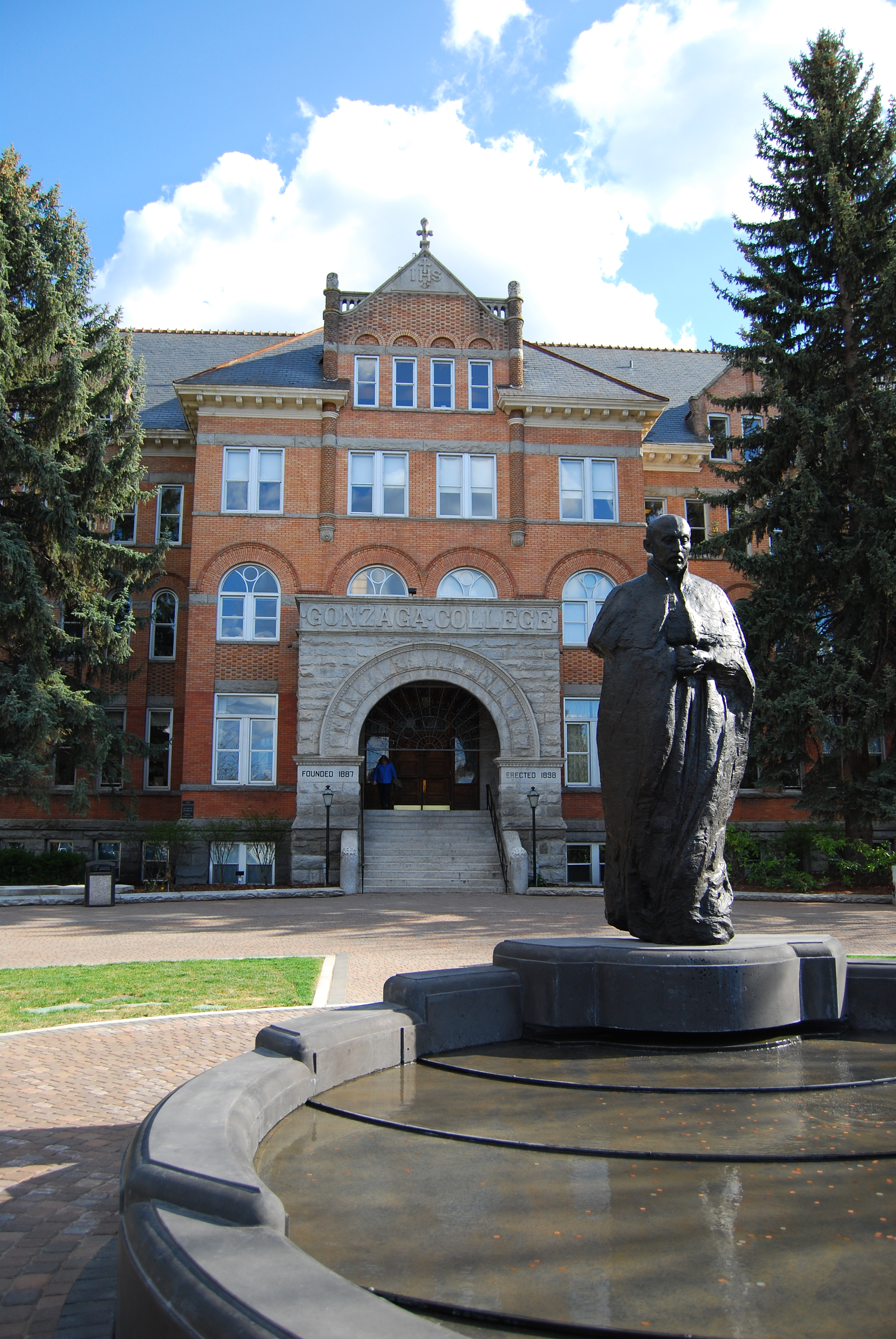
Gonzaga University

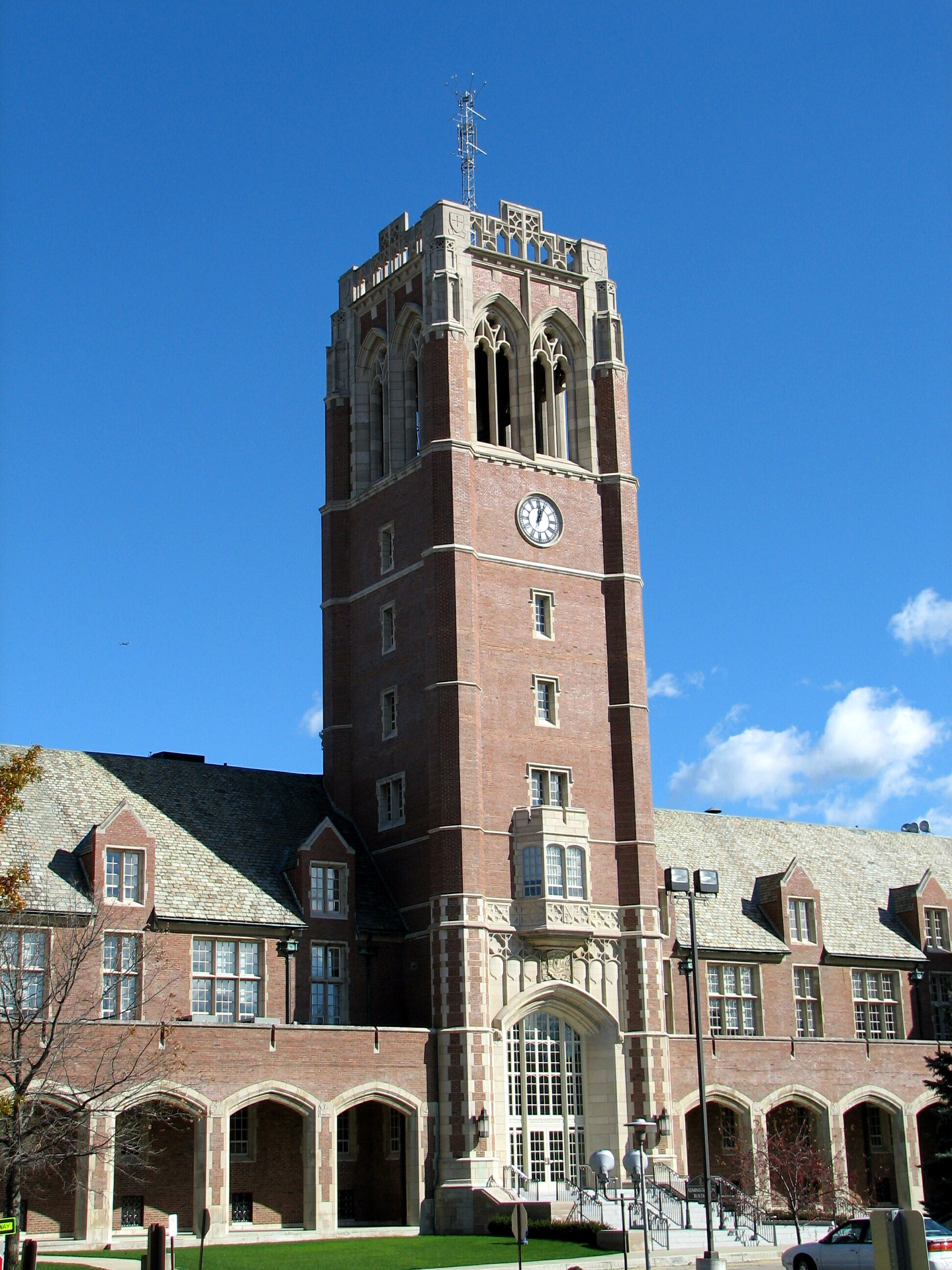
John Carroll University

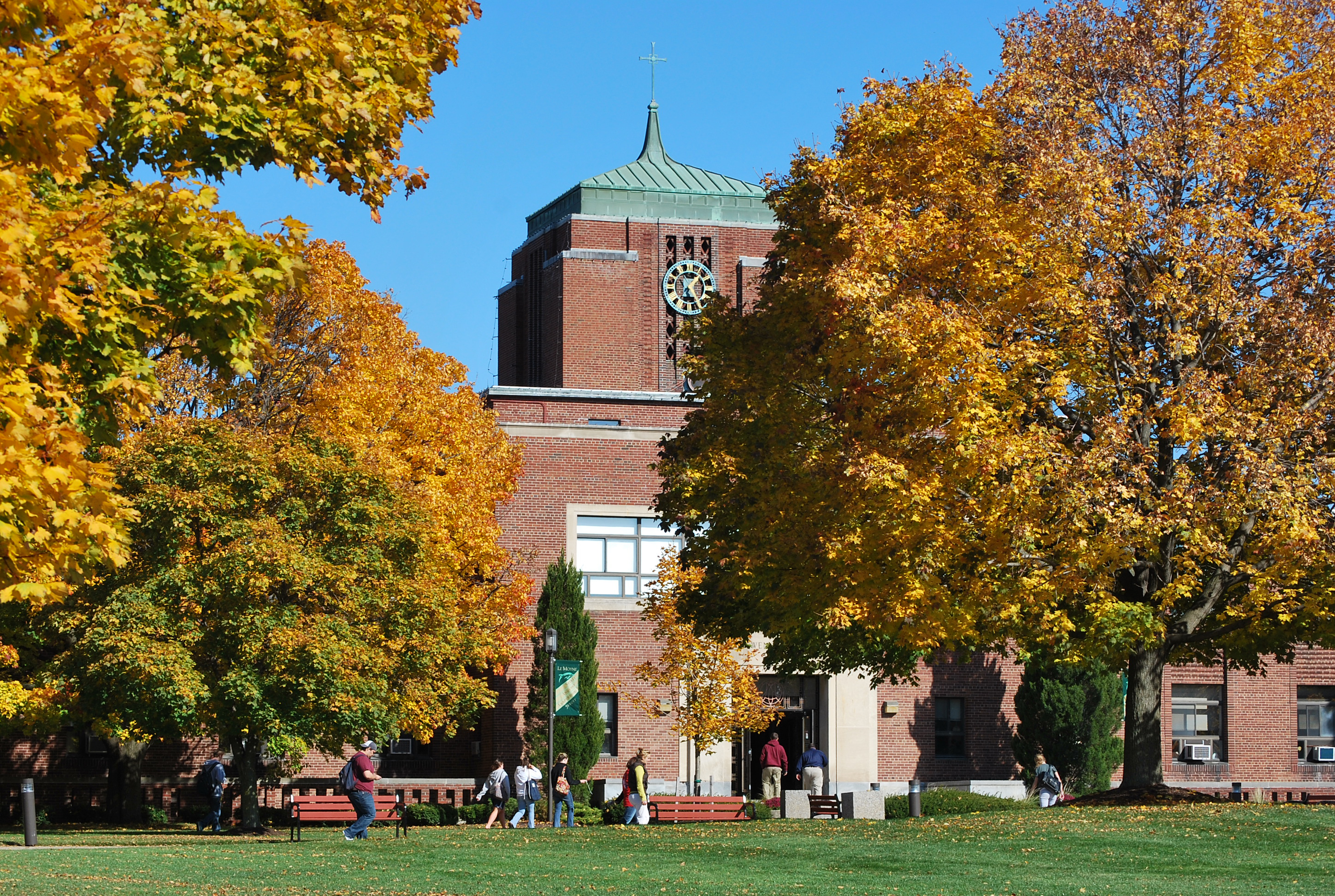
Le Moyne College

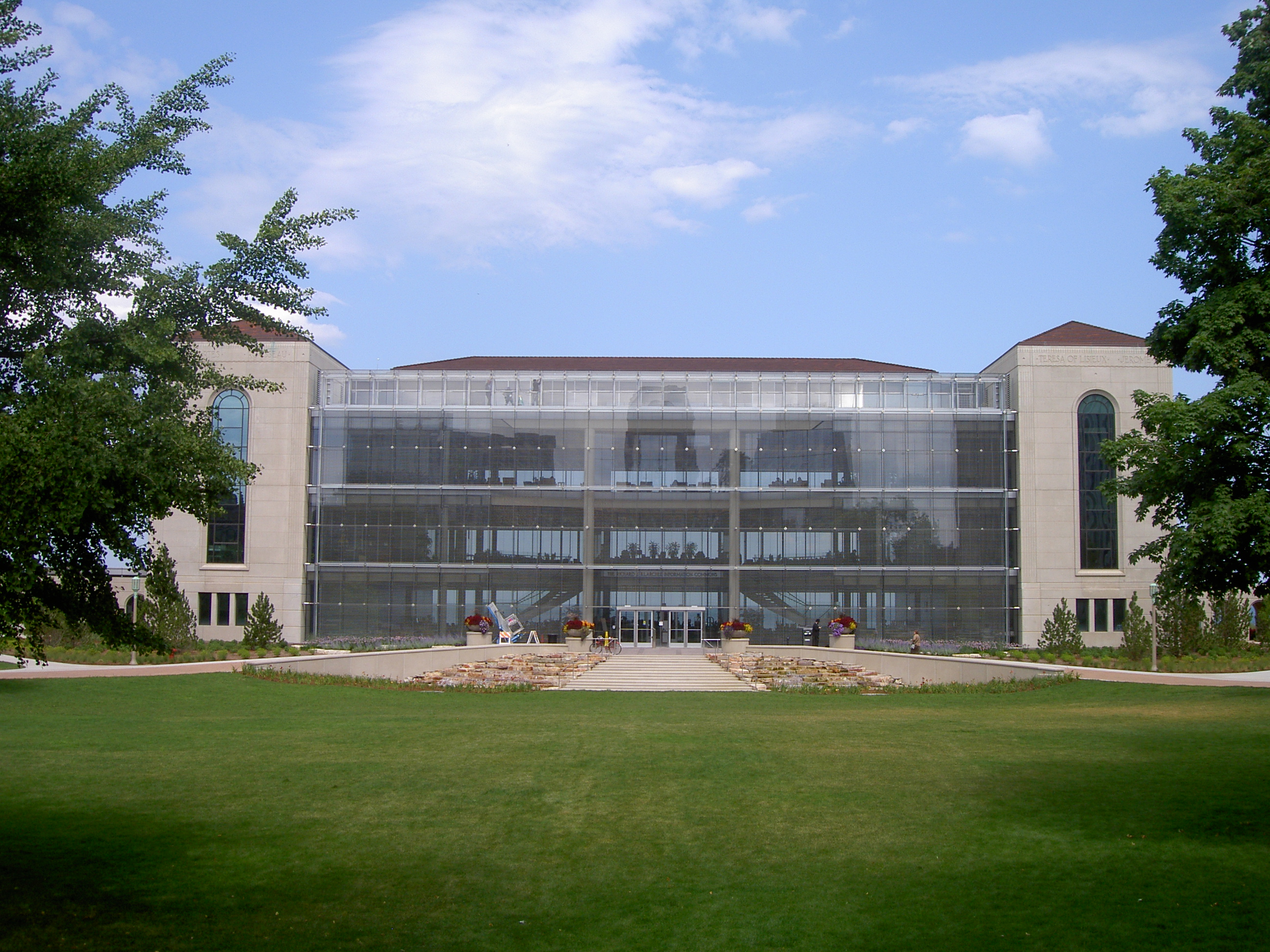
Loyola University Chicago

Loyola University Maryland

Loyola Marymount University

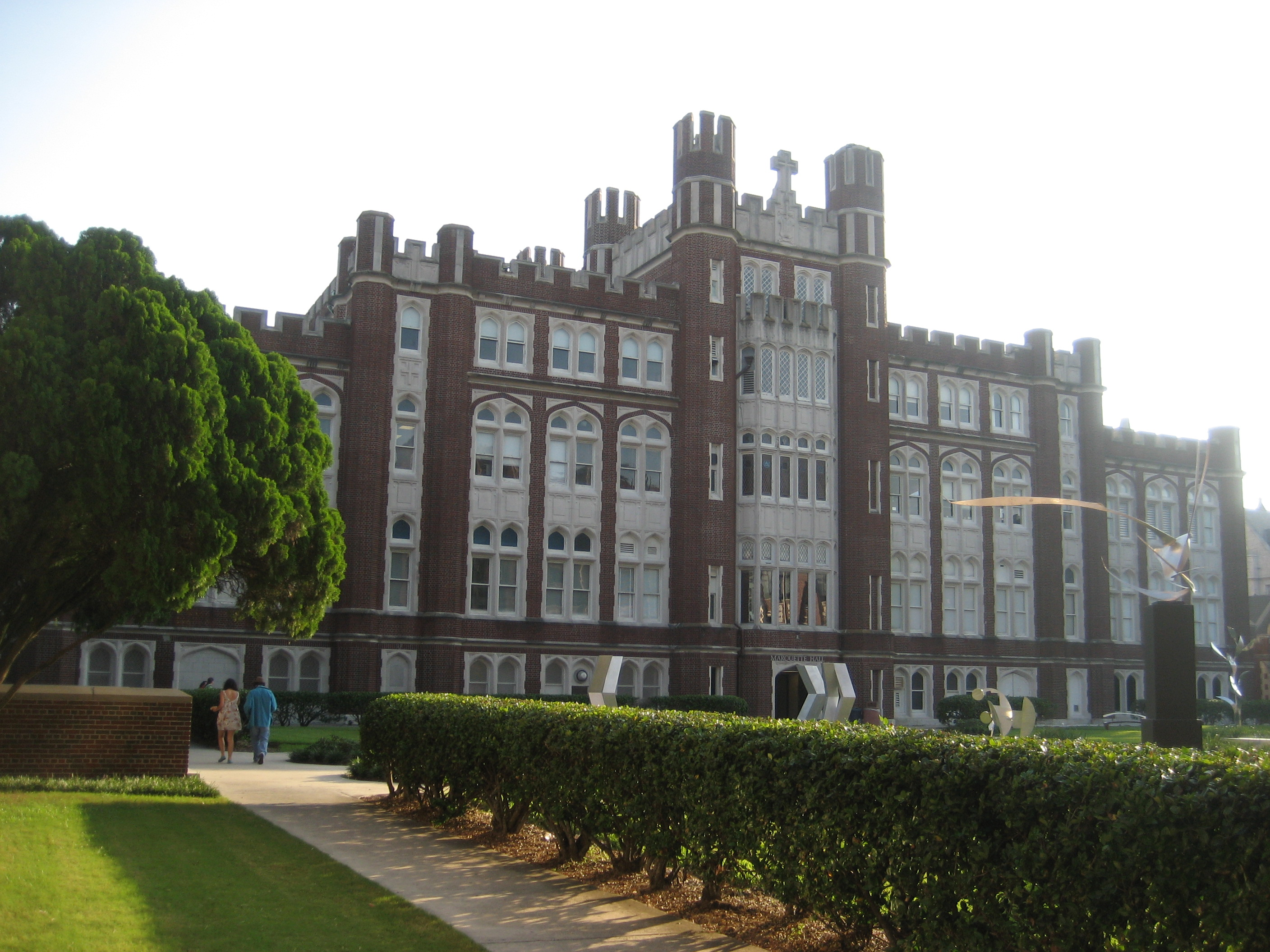
Loyola University New Orleans

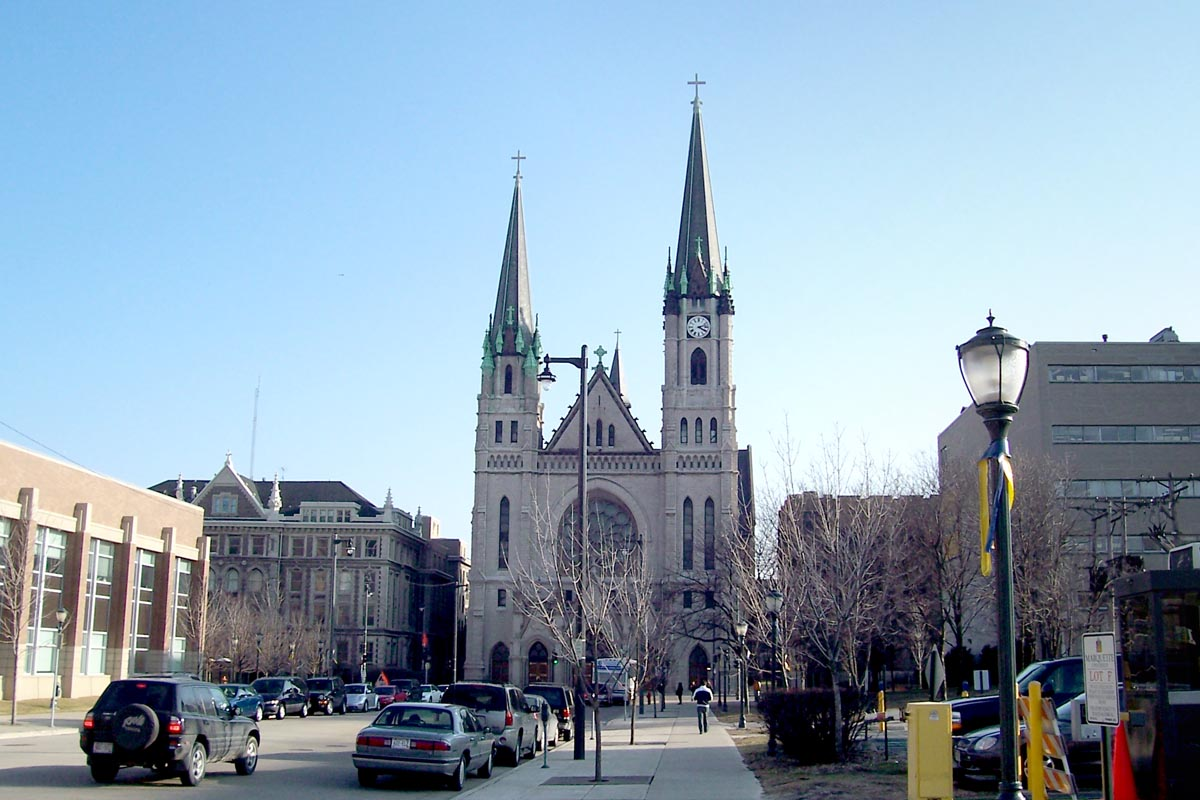
Marquette University

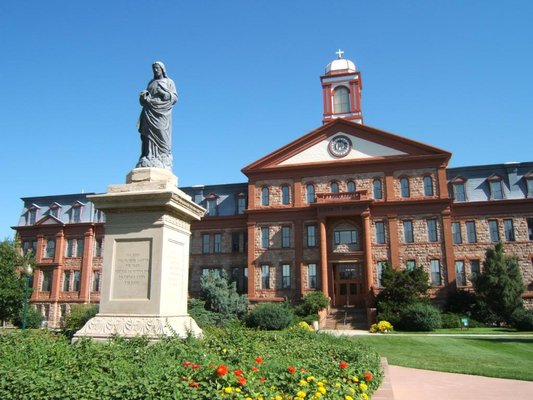
Regis University

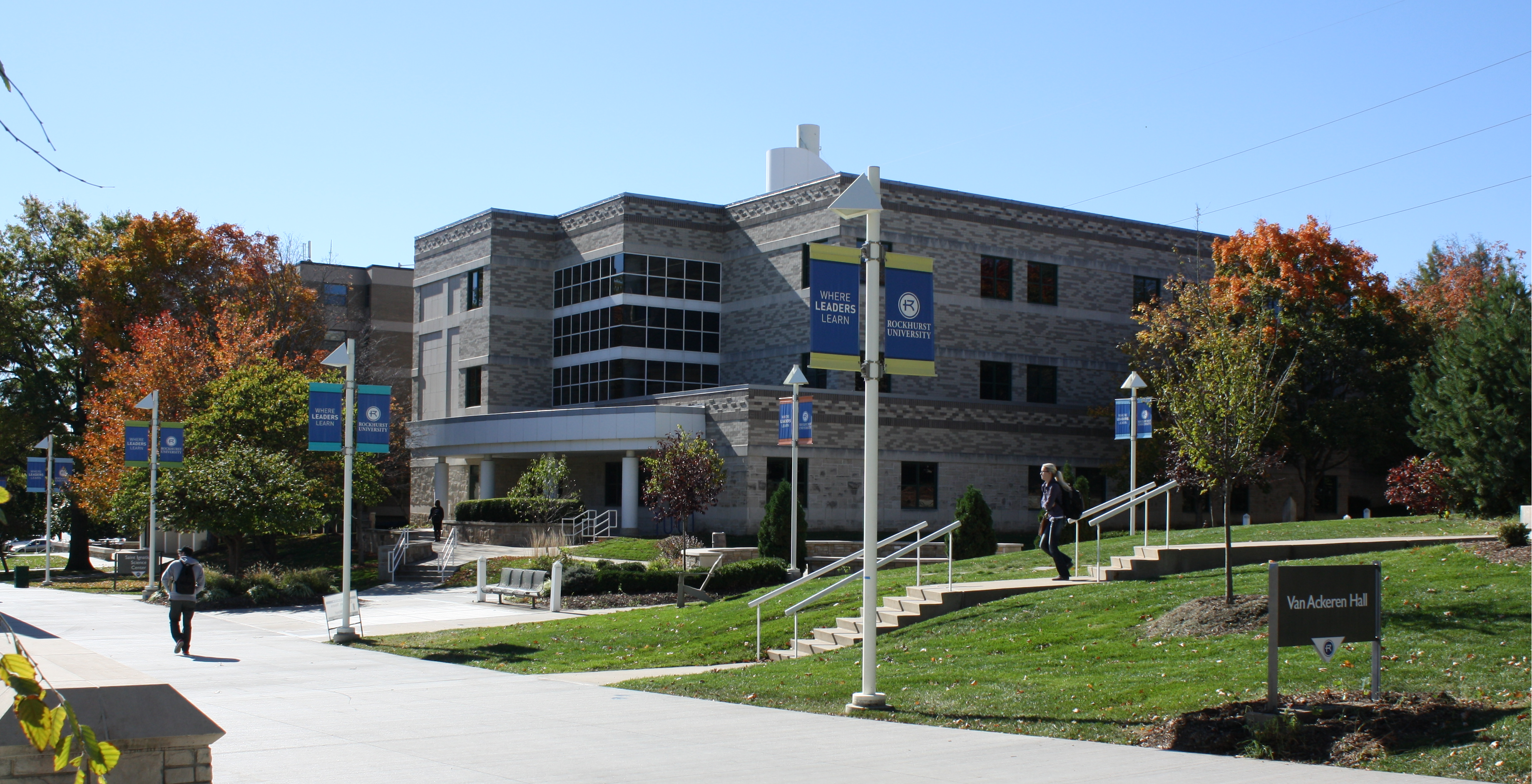
Rockhurst University

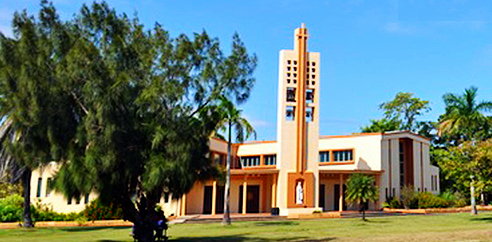
St. John's College

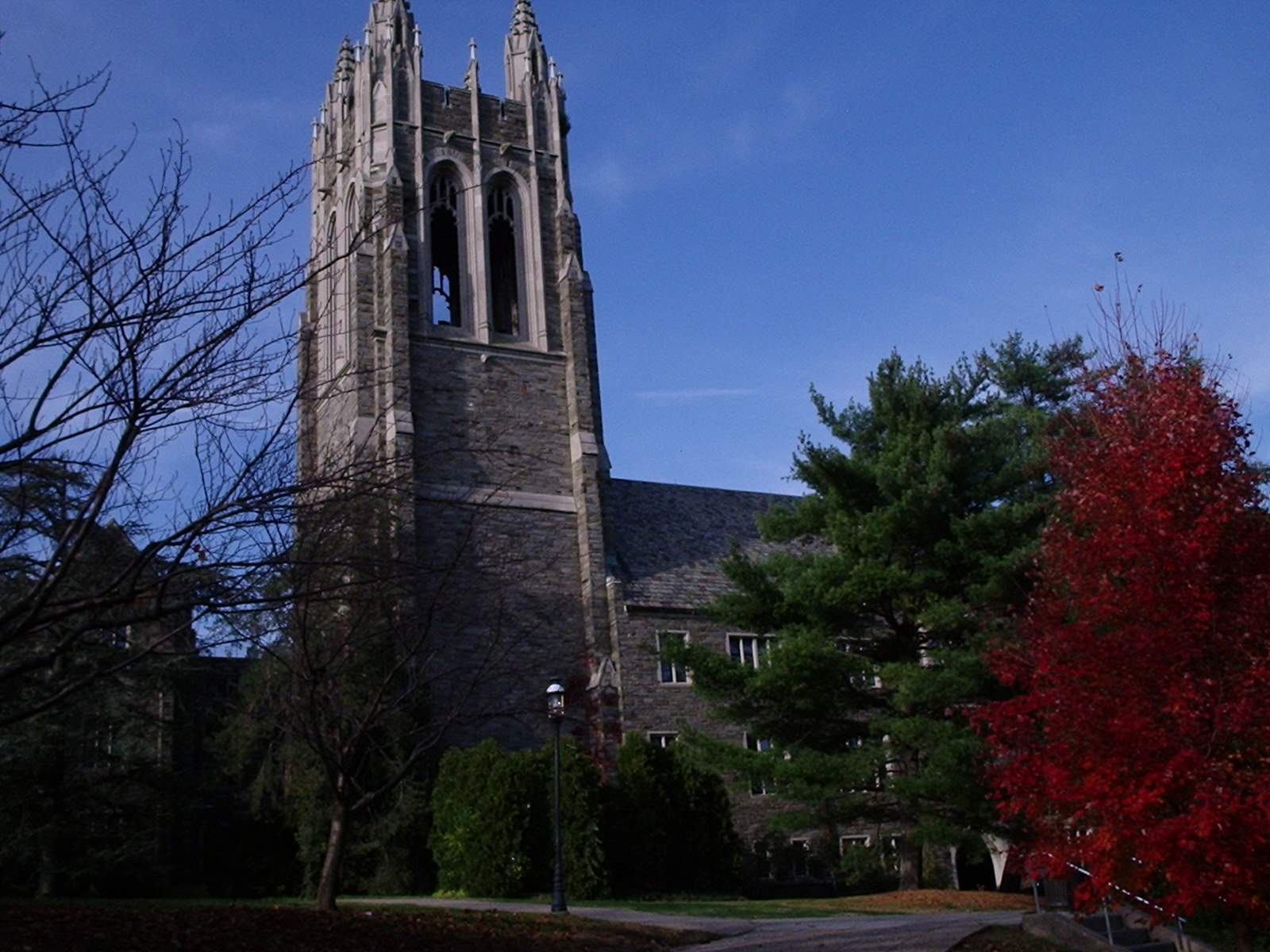
Saint Joseph's University

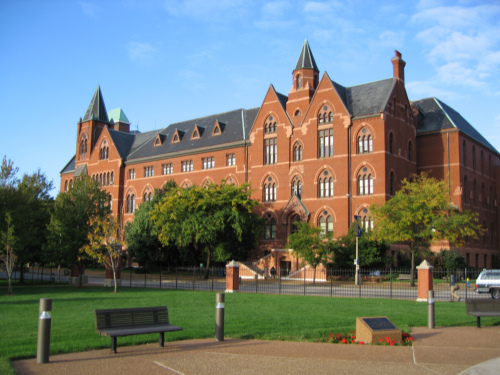
Saint Louis University

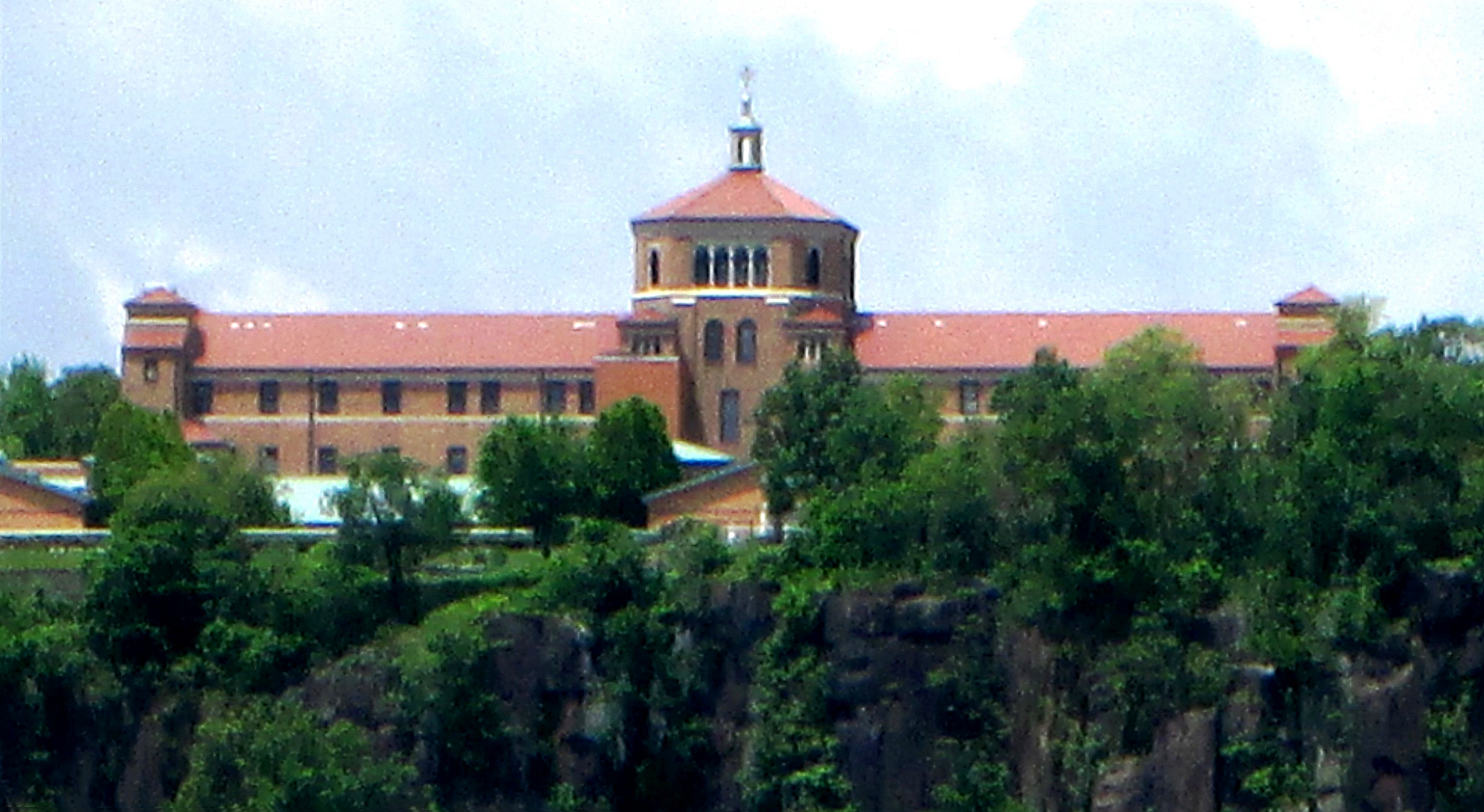
Saint Peter's University

Santa Clara University

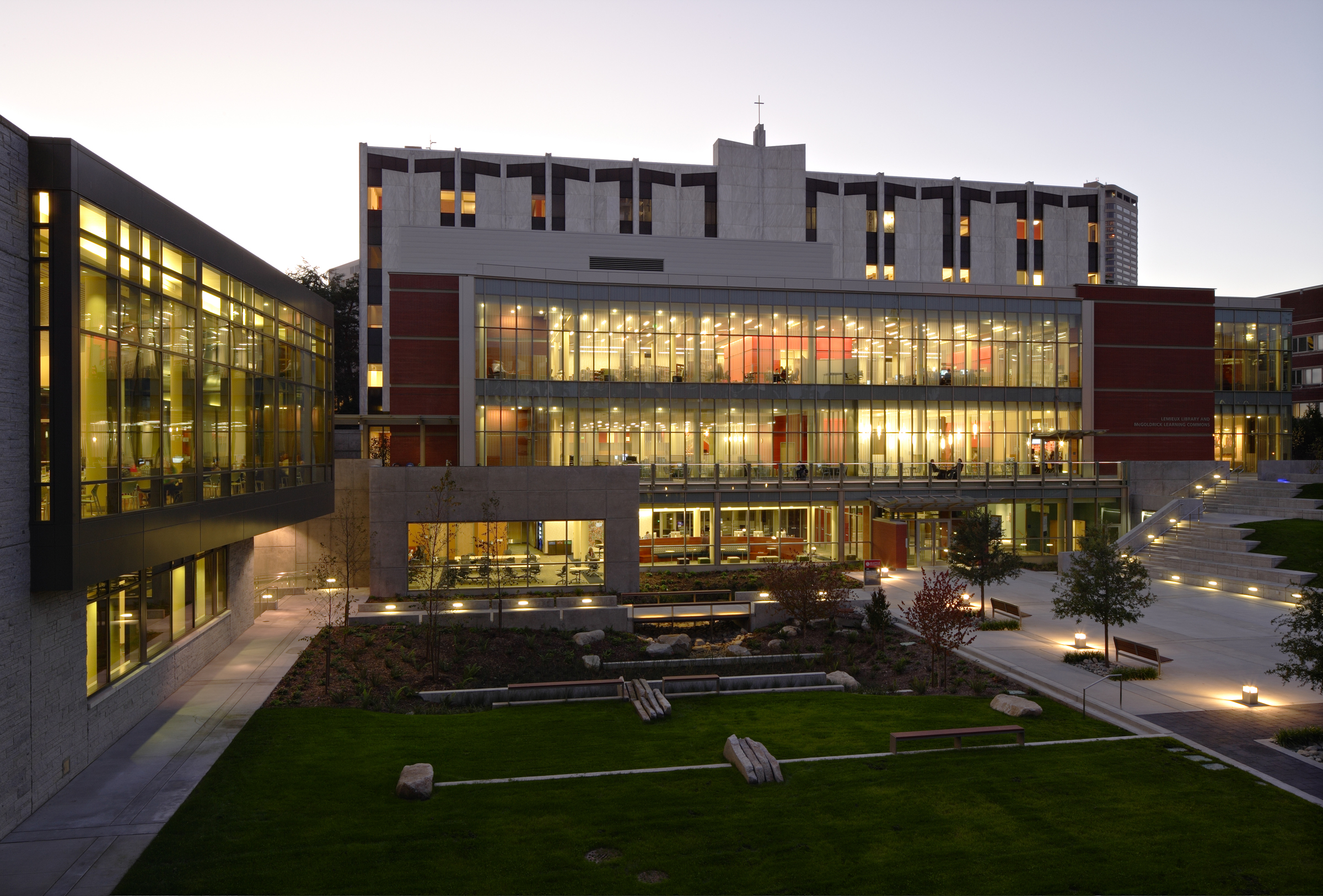
Seattle University

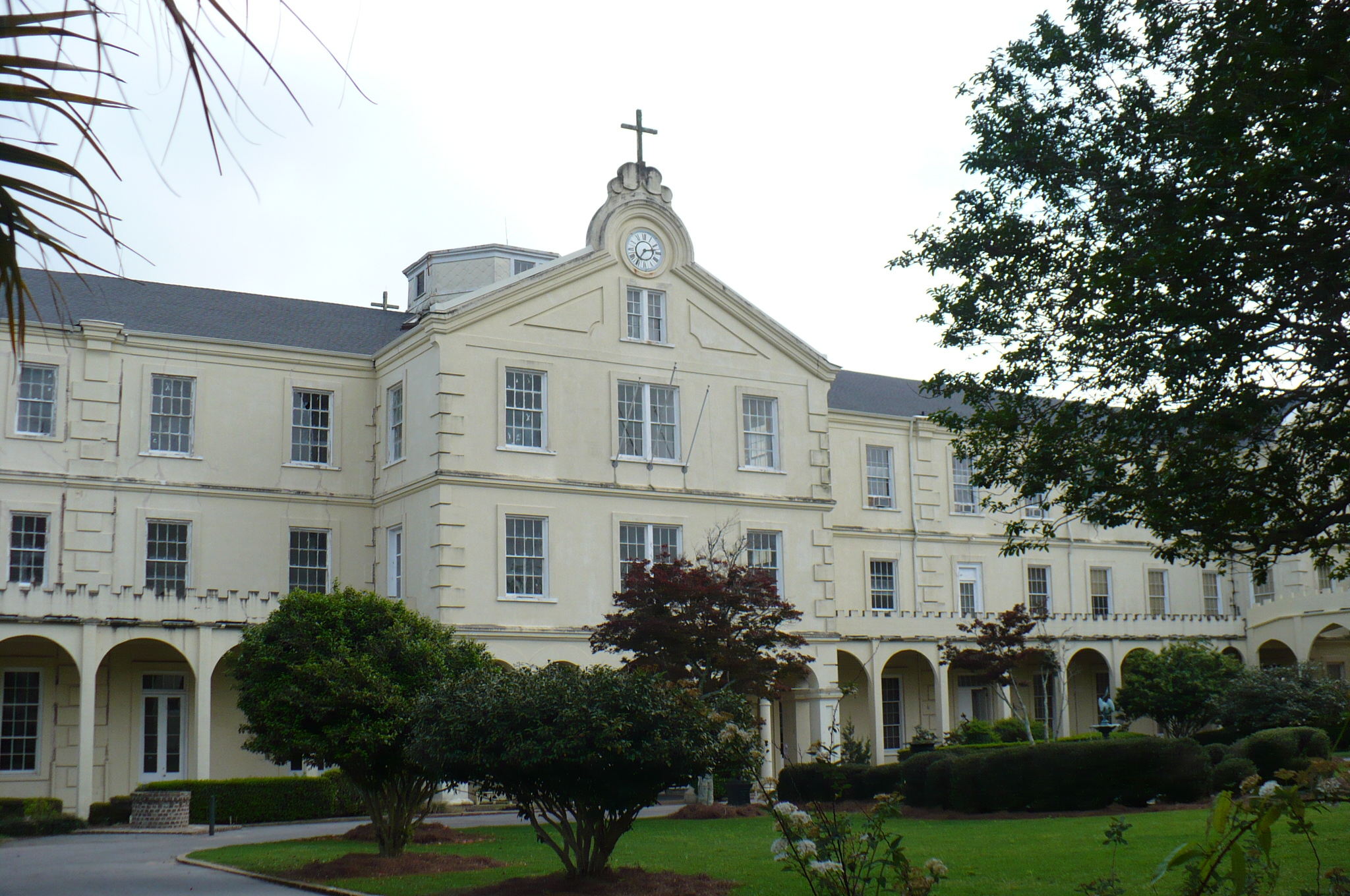
Spring Hill College

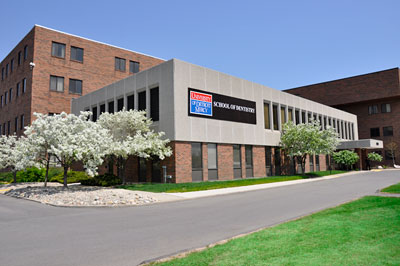
University of Detroit Mercy

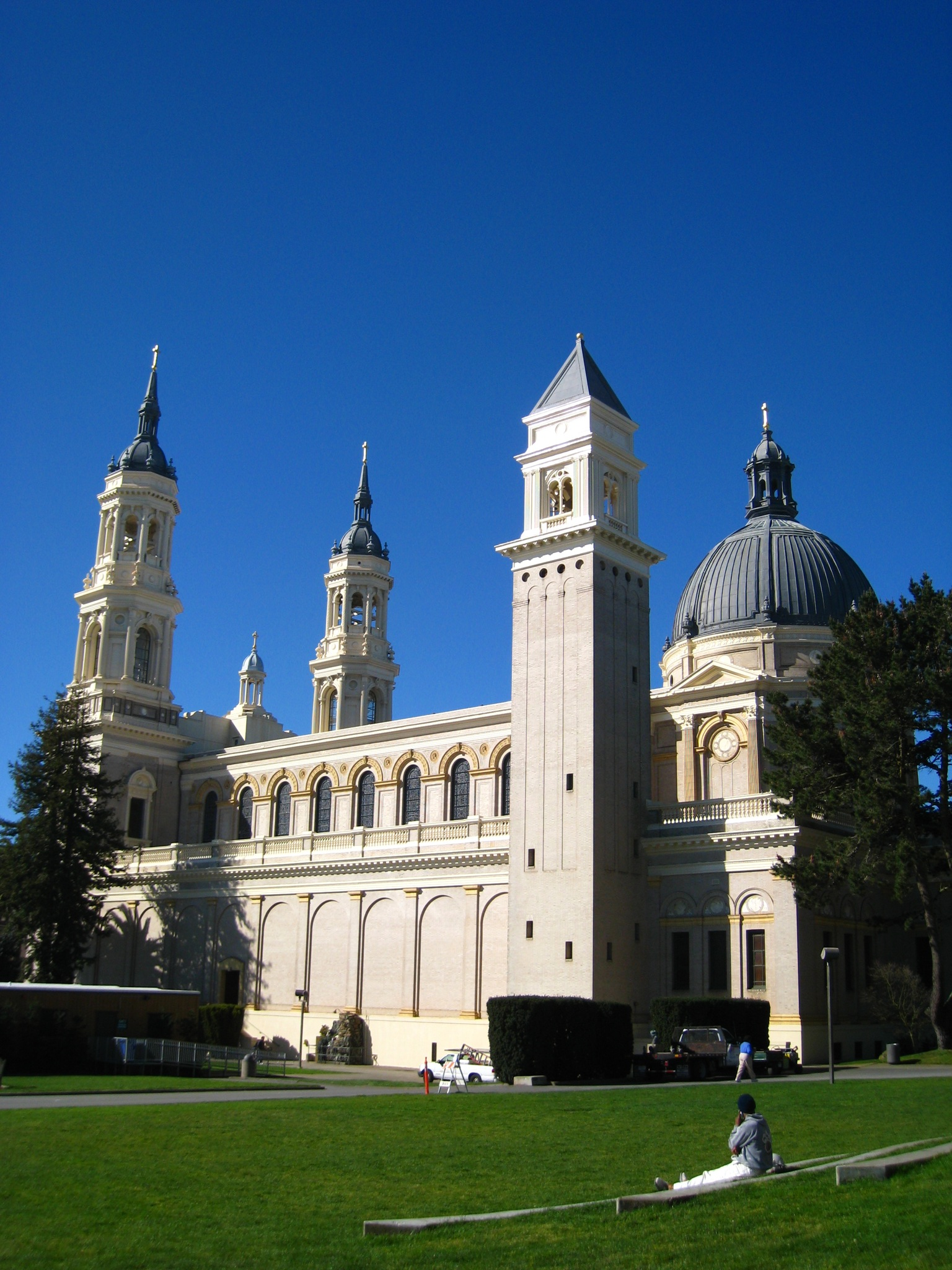
University of San Francisco

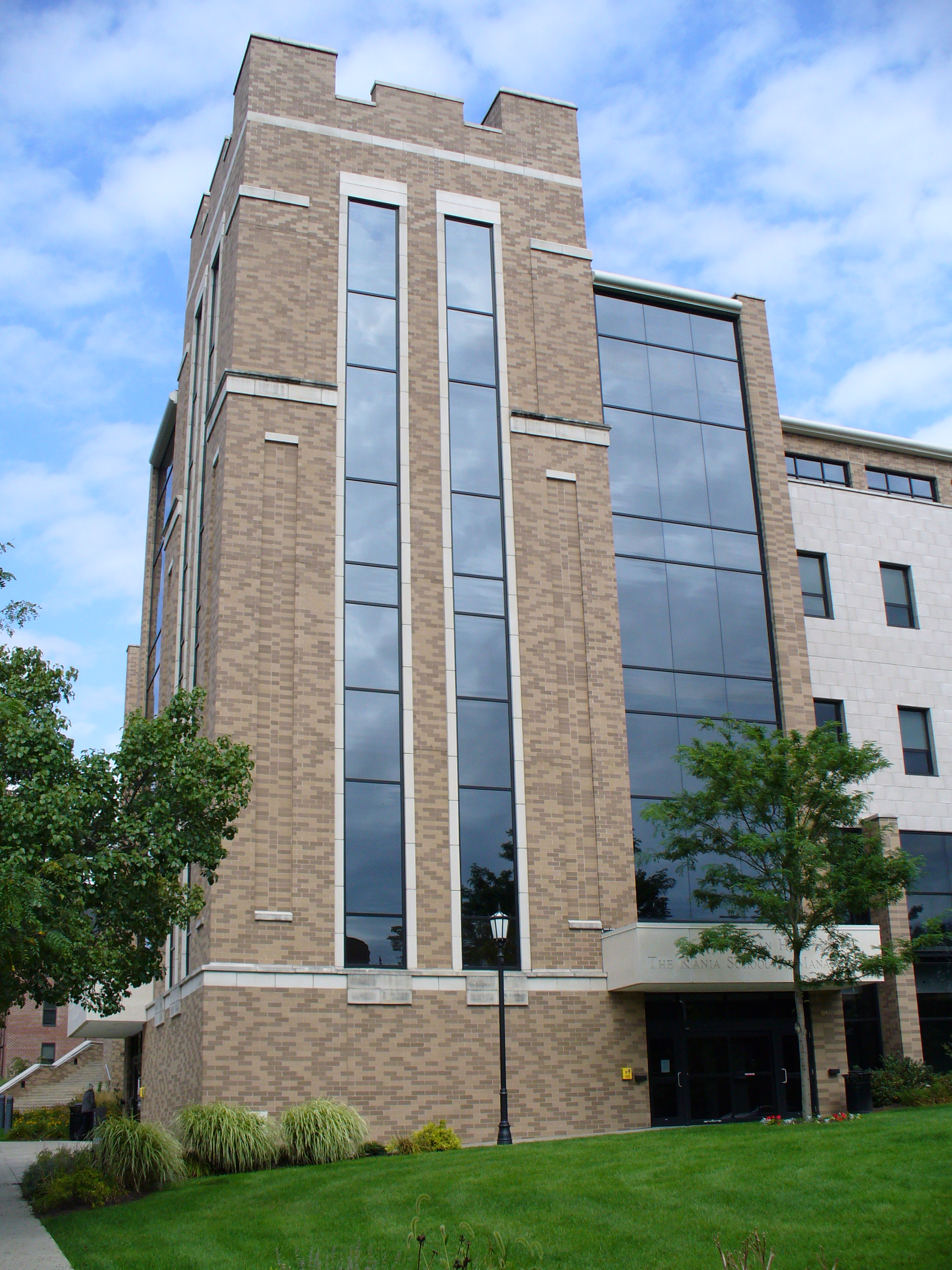
University of Scranton

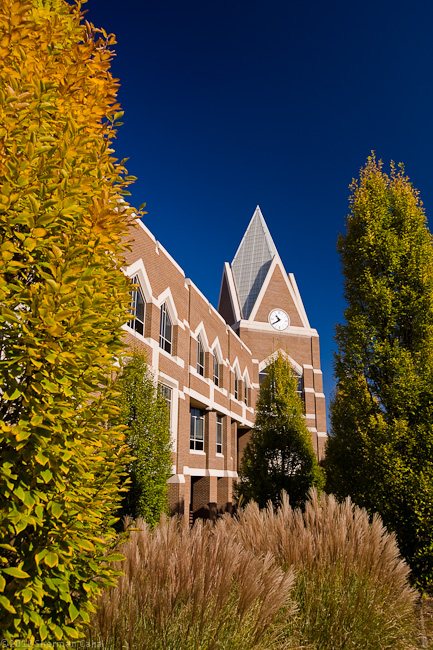
Xavier University

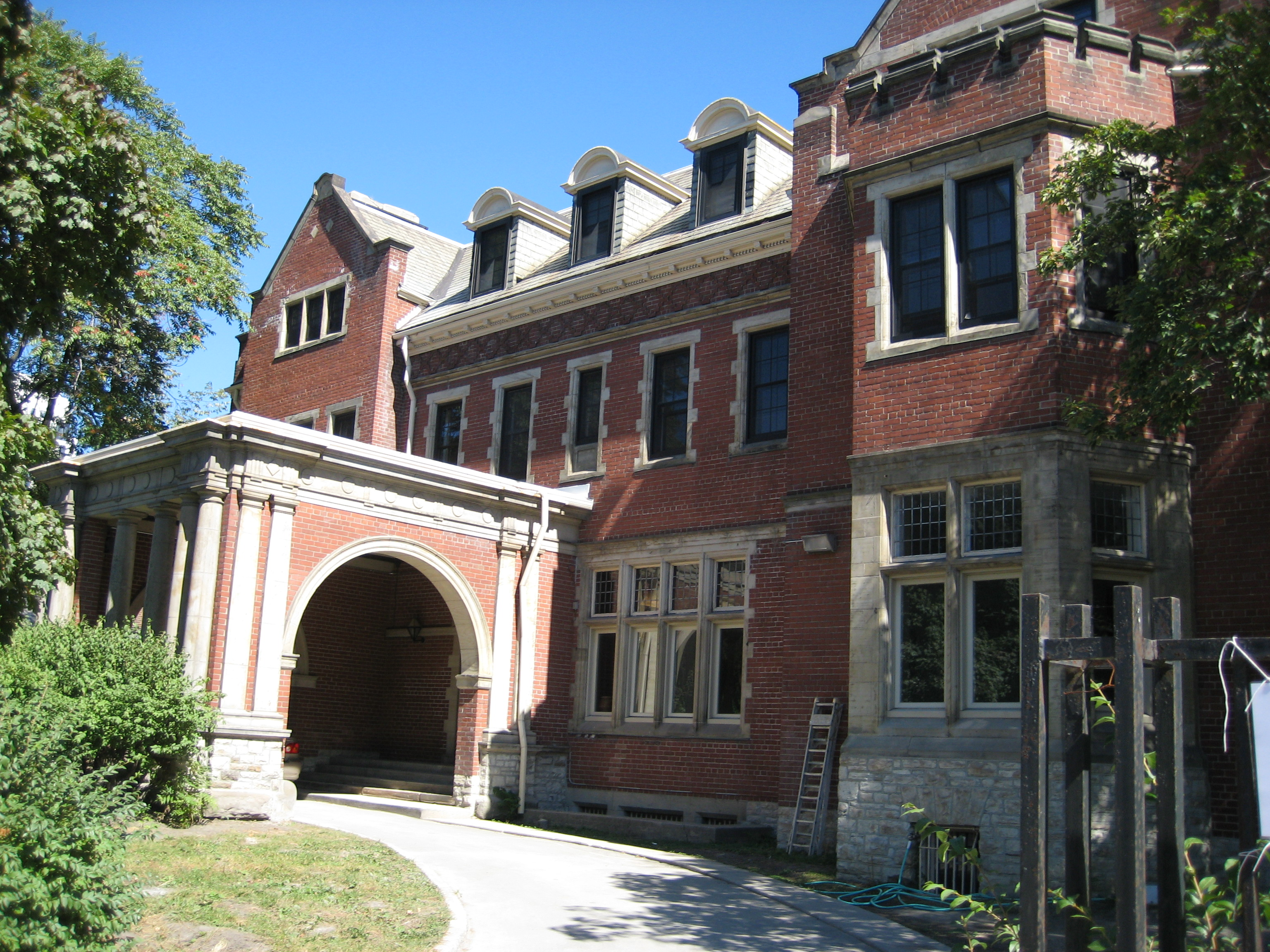
Regis College

== See also ==
- Jesuits in the United States
- Alpha Sigma Nu – honor society for students at Jesuit institutions of higher education
- Gamma Pi Epsilon – defunct honor society for women at Jesuit institutions of higher education
- List of Jesuit institutions
- Jesuit Ivy
