= Mary Rakow =

American novelist

- Education: University of California, Riverside; Harvard University; Boston College (PhD)
- Occupation: Novelist
- Website: www.maryrakow.com

Mary Rakow is an American novelist.

== Life ==
She graduated magna cum laude and Phi Beta Kappa from University of California, Riverside, in 1970, from Harvard University with a master's degree in Theological Studies, and from Boston College with a Ph.D. in Theology, Alpha Sigma Nu Jesuit Honor Society. Her work has appeared in Works & Conversations. She has appeared on Writers on Writing, with Barbara DeMarco-Barrett KUCI-FM.

Rakow is a member of PEN Center USA/West, where she has mentored in the PEN Rosenthal Emerging Voices Program.

Rakow is a novelist and freelance editor living in San Francisco as an urban hermit in the ancient Catholic Christian tradition.

== Awards ==
- 2002 10 Best Books in the West, L.A. Times, 2002
- 2003 Lannan Literary Fellowship
- 2003 William Saroyan International Prize for Writing shortlist
- 2010 Whale and Star residency in the studio of Enrique Martínez Celaya

== Works ==
- "Poeta: from The Memory Room". In Posse Review (12).
- Mary Rakow. (28 Feb 2002). The Memory Room. Counterpoint Press. ISBN 978-1-58243-172-7.
- Matthew Biro, Leo A. Harrington, Mary Rakow (2012). Martinez Celaya, Working Methods. Ediciones Poligrafa. ISBN 978-84-343-1316-3.
- Mary Rakow. (15 Dec 2015). This Is Why I Came, a novel. Counterpoint Press. ISBN 978-1-61902-575-2.

=== Anthology ===
- Samantha Dunn (2005). Women on the Edge. Toby Press. ISBN 978-1-59264-125-3.

=== Theology ===
- "Christ's Descent into Hell: Calvin's Interpretation", Religion in Life, 43, (Summer 1974)
