= Brett Kissela =

American vascular neurologist

Brett M. Kissela
- Born: Fond du Lac, Wisconsin, United States
- Spouse: Lorie Cucinello (m. 1992)

Academic background
- Education: BSc, 1991, Marquette University; MD, 1995, Washington University in St. Louis

Brett Mancos Kissela is an American vascular neurologist. He is the Senior Associate Dean of Clinical Research, Chief of Research Services for UC Health, and the Albert Barnes Voorheis Endowed Chair and Professor.

== Early life and education ==
Kissela was born in Fond du Lac, Wisconsin, United States, to parents Elise and Gregory. Growing up in Wisconsin, Kissela attended St. Mary's Springs Academy where he competed on their tennis team. After graduating from St. Mary's in 1987, Kissela enrolled at Marquette University for his undergraduate degree. Upon graduating from Marquette in 1991, Kissela was inducted into Alpha Sigma Nu for his high academic performance. Following Marquette, Kissela received his medical degree from Washington University School of Medicine in 1995. Upon earning his medical degree, Kissela completed an internship at the Medical College of Wisconsin, a neurology residency at the University of Michigan (UMich), and a fellowship at the University of Cincinnati (UC) in cerebrovascular disease.

== Career ==
Upon completing his medical training, Kissela joined the UC College of Medicine faculty in 2000. During his early tenure at UC, Kissela became co-director of the Stroke Recovery Center and a member of the Greater Cincinnati/Northern Kentucky Stroke Team. In 2005, he received the American Academy of Neurology's Michael Pessin Stroke Leadership prize for being a "leader in stroke treatment, epidemiology and research". Kissela eventually replaced Joseph Broderick as a co-principal investigator on the Greater Cincinnati/ Northern Kentucky Stroke Study, which aimed to identify all hospitalized and autopsied stroke and transient ischemic attack cases in a five-county region. While overseeing this study, he also determined that stroke survivors were becoming younger than the average age of 70. He correlated this decrease with the rise of diabetes in the United States.

Prior to the 2013–14 academic year, Kissela was appointed the Albert Barnes Voorheis Chair of Neurology and Rehabilitation Medicine at the UC College of Medicine and UC Health. In this role, he continued to oversee the Greater Cincinnati/ Northern Kentucky Stroke Study alongside Dawn Kleindorfer. In 2017, Kissela was named the Senior Associate Dean for Clinical Research at the UC College of Medicine and chief of research services for UC Health. He was later accepted into the 2019–2020 Class of the Association of American Medical Colleges Council of Deans Fellows.

During the COVID-19 pandemic, Kissela oversaw the first major COVID-19 vaccine trial in Cincinnati to find an effective vaccine against the novel coronavirus. In 2022, Kissela was appointed executive vice dean for the UC College of Medicine while continuing to direct the Office of Clinical Research and serve as the Albert Barnes Voorheis Endowed Chair and Professor.

== Personal life ==
Kissela married his wife Lorie in 1992, and they have three children together. In his free time, Kissela tours with a community choir.
