= Gamma Pi Epsilon =

Women's honor society at Jesuit colleges

- ΓΠΕ
- Founded: 1924; 102 years ago Marquette University
- Type: Honor
- Affiliation: Independent
- Status: Merged
- Merge date: March 30, 1973
- Successor: Alpha Sigma Nu
- Emphasis: Jesuit college and university women
- Scope: National
- Motto: Pour Gloise L'Ecole "For the Glory of the School"
- Chapters: 14
- Headquarters: United States

Gamma Pi Epsilon (ΓΠΕ) was the women's honor society of Jesuit colleges and universities. It was established in 1924 at Marquette University. In 1973, it merged with its male counterpart, Alpha Sigma Nu.

== History ==
When Marquette University went co-ed in 1924, there was a desire for a women's honor society alongside the all-male Alpha Sigma Nu which had been created nine years prior. Gamma Pi Epsilon was approved in 1924 and the first chapter chartered on April 6, 1925 at Marquette University. Josephine Newell O’Gorman is considered the founder of Gamma Pi Epsilon.

Gamma Pi Epsilon was open to women of every academic discipline at a college or university that was a member of the Association of Jesuit Colleges and Universities. It became a national society when it chartered a second chapter at Saint Louis University in 1947. Gamma Pi Epsilon collaborated with Alpha Sigma Nu, with both groups chartering new chapters on campuses at the same time.

At its annual convention in 1964, Alpha Sigma Nu decided to become a coeducational organization. The boards of the two organizations met in March 1972 to discuss a merger. On March 30, 1973, Alpha Sigma Nu and Gamma Pi Epsilon merged under the name of Alpha Sigma Nu (ΑΣΝ), becoming an honor society for both men and women.

== Symbols ==
Gamma Pi Epsilon's motto was Pour Gloise L'Ecole or "For the Glory of the School".

== Chapters ==
At the time of the merger with Alpha Sigma Nu in 1973, Gamma Pi Epsilon had chartered fourteen chapters.

Charter date and range	Institution	Location	Status	Ref.
April 6, 1925 – March 30, 1973	Marquette University	Milwaukee, Wisconsin	Merged (ΑΣΝ)	
1947 – March 30, 1973	Saint Louis University	St. Louis, Missouri	Merged (ΑΣΝ)	
1950 – March 30, 1973	Gonzaga University	Spokane, Washington	Merged (ΑΣΝ)	
1951 – March 30, 1973	Le Moyne College	DeWitt, New York	Merged (ΑΣΝ)	
1952 – March 30, 1973	Creighton University	Omaha, Nebraska	Merged (ΑΣΝ)	
1953 – March 30, 1973	University of Detroit Mercy,	Detroit, Michigan	Merged (ΑΣΝ)	
1958 – March 30, 1973	University of San Francisco	San Francisco, California	Merged (ΑΣΝ)	
1959 – March 30, 1973	Wheeling Jesuit University	Wheeling, West Virginia	Merged (ΑΣΝ)	
1962 – March 30, 1973	Seattle University	Seattle, Washington	Merged (ΑΣΝ)	
1963 – March 30, 1973	Georgetown University	Washington, D.C.	Merged (ΑΣΝ)	
1964 – March 30, 1973	John Carroll University	University Heights, Ohio	Merged (ΑΣΝ)	
1966 – March 30, 1973	Santa Clara University	Santa Clara, California	Merged (ΑΣΝ)	
1971 – March 30, 1973	Regis University	Denver, Colorado	Merged (ΑΣΝ)	
1971 – March 30, 1973	Xavier University	Cincinnati, Ohio	Merged (ΑΣΝ)	

== See also ==
- Association of Jesuit Colleges and Universities
- List of Jesuit institutions
- Jesuit Ivy
