= Michael J. Kaufman =

American law school dean

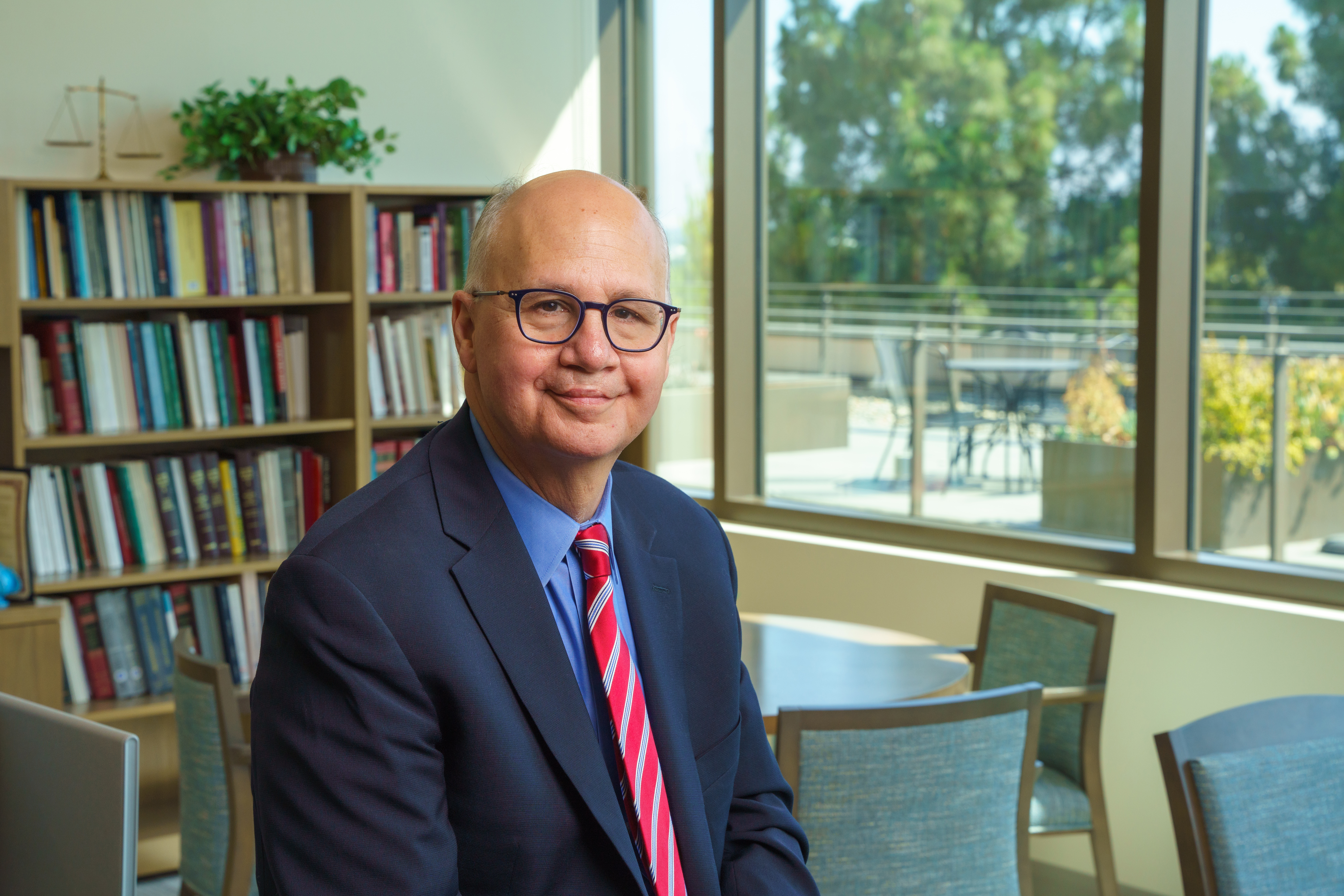
- Born: October 26, 1958 (age 67)
- Occupation: Professor

Academic background
- Education: Kenyon College (BA); University of Michigan (JD)

Academic work
- Institutions: Santa Clara University School of Law

Michael J. Kaufman (born October 26, 1958) is an American legal scholar who is the Dean and a Professor of Law at Santa Clara University School of Law. He previously served as Dean of Loyola University Chicago School of Law, where he also held several administrative positions at Loyola University Chicago, including Acting Provost and Chief Academic Officer and Vice Provost for Academic Strategy. His research and teaching focuses on education law, equity, policy, and pedagogy; securities regulation and litigation; and civil procedure and dispute resolution.

== Career ==
Kaufman started his legal career with a clerkship for Judge Nathaniel R. Jones of the United States Court of Appeals for the Sixth Circuit. He then practiced civil rights law and securities litigation at Sachnoff & Weaver (now part of Reed Smith). In 1986, he joined the faculty of the Loyola University Chicago School of Law, where he taught Education Law and Policy, Civil Procedure, Business Organizations, Securities Law, and other courses.

At Loyola University Chicago School of Law, Kaufman served in a variety of administrative capacities. In 2005, he also became Associate Dean for Academic Affairs, a role he held for 11 years until he became Dean of the law school in 2016. Kaufman founded Loyola's Rodin Center for Social Justice, Education Law and Policy Institute, Rule of Law Institute, and Institute for Investor Protection. Kaufman also developed Loyola Chicago Law School's hybrid Weekend JD program.

In 2018, he became Vice Provost for Academic Strategy for Loyola University Chicago. In 2021, he briefly held the roles of Acting Provost and Chief Academic Officer.

While a law professor at Loyola University Chicago, Kaufman was elected to three terms on the Board of Education for Illinois North Shore School District 112, where he served as vice president from 1999 to 2001 and president from 2001 to 2004.

Kaufman has served as a public arbitrator for securities matters, as well as an expert consultant for the U.S. Securities and Exchange Commission, the Consumer Financial Protection Bureau, and the Illinois Attorney General's Office. He also has delivered bar examination review lectures to hundreds of thousands of law school graduates for bar exams throughout the country, including in California.

== Scholarship ==
=== Select publications ===
- From Texas Gulf Sulphur to Laudato Si’: Mining Equitable Principles from Insider Trading Law, 71 S.M.U. L. Rev. 811 (2018)
- Social Justice and the American Law School Today: Since We are Made for Love, 40 Seattle L. Rev. 1187 (2017)
- Paving the Delaware Way: Legislative and Equitable Limits on Fee Shifting By Laws after ATP, 93 Washington University in St. Louis Law Rev. 335 (2015) (with J. Wunderlich)
- Messy Mental Markers: Inferring Scienter from Core Operations in Securities Fraud Litigation, 73 Ohio St. L.J. 507 (2012) (with J. Wunderlich)
- Fraud Created the Market, 63 Ala. L. Rev. 275 (2012)) (with J. Wunderlich)
- Toward a Just Measure of Repose: The Statute of Limitations for Securities Fraud, 52 William & Mary L. Rev. 1547 (2011) (with J. Wunderlich)
- Regressing: The Troubling Dispositive Role of Event Studies in Securities Fraud Litigation, 15 Stan. J. L. Bus. & Fin. 183 (2009) (with J. Wunderlich)
- Reading, Writing and Race: The Constitutionality of Educational Strategies Designed to Teach Racial Literacy, 41 U. Rich. L. Rev. 707 (2007)

=== Select books ===
- Badges and Incidents: A Transdisciplinary History of the Right to Education in America (2019)
- Education Law, Policy and Practice: Cases and Materials (with S. Kaufman)
- Learning Civil Procedure (with Baicker-McKee, Coleman, Herr and Stempel)
- Rule 10b-5 Private Securities-Fraud Litigation
- Blue Sky Law (with J. Long and J. Wunderlich)
- Securities Litigation: Damages
- Depositions: Law, Strategy and Technique (with Lisnek)
- Securities Litigation: Law, Policy and Practice (with M. Steinberg, W. Couture, and D. Morrissey)

== Awards and professional recognition ==
- Loyola University Chicago School of Law Faculty Member of the Year (2016–2017 and 2009–2010)
- Winner, 2020 Choice Outstanding Academic Title for Badges & Incidents book
- Loyola University Chicago School of Law Medal of Excellence (2021)
- Inducted into Jesuit University Honor Society Alpha Sigma Nu (2021)
