= Vincent Rougeau =

American lawyer

Vincent D. Rougeau

33rd President of the College of the Holy Cross
- Incumbent
- Assumed office July 1, 2021
- Preceded by: Philip Boroughs

Dean of Boston College Law School
- In office July 1, 2011 – July 1, 2021
- Preceded by: George Brown (acting)
- Succeeded by: Diane Ring (acting)

Personal details
- Born: June 17, 1963 (age 62); Miami Beach, Florida, U.S.
- Education: Brown University (BA); Harvard University (JD)

Vincent D. Rougeau (born June 17, 1963) is an American legal scholar who serves as the 33rd president of the College of the Holy Cross. He is the college's first lay and first Black president. Before assuming the position, Rougeau served as the dean of Boston College Law School from 2011 to 2021 and was the president of the Association of American Law Schools.

== Early life and education ==
Rougeau was born on June 17, 1963, in Miami Beach, Florida, to Catholic parents. His father, Weldon Rougeau, graduated from Harvard Law School in 1972 and became involved as an attorney in the Civil Rights Movement. His mother, a medical professional, worked at a Jewish hospital in Miami Beach.

Rougeau was raised in Chicago, Illinois; Cambridge, Massachusetts; Queens, New York; and Silver Spring, Maryland. After graduating from Wheaton High School, he received a scholarship to attend Brown University and graduated in 1985 with a Bachelor of Arts (B.A.) in international relations, magna cum laude. He then attended Harvard Law School, where he was an editor of the Harvard Human Rights Journal, and received his Juris Doctor (J.D.) in 1988.

== Career ==
Rougeau is a member of the bar in Maryland and the District of Columbia. From 1988 to 1991, he was in private practice at the law firm of Morrison & Foerster in Washington, D.C. He was a professor of law at Loyola University Chicago from 1991 to 1997.

Rougeau joined the faculty of Notre Dame Law School as a visiting associate professor in 1997. He gained tenure and was the school's Associate Dean for Academic Affairs from 1999 to 2002.

In 2011, Rougeau was appointed Dean of Boston College Law School. He served in that capacity until July 2021, when he assumed the role of President at the College of the Holy Cross. Upon his appointment, Rougeau identified increasing diversity and the college's relationship with the city of Worcester as among his strategic priorities. He was succeeded as dean of the Boston College Law School by Odette Lienau.

In January 2021, Rougeau was inducted as president of the Association of American Law Schools.

== Personal life ==
Rougeau is married to Robin Kornegay-Rougeau, with whom he has three children: Christian, Alexander, and Vincent.

== Publications ==
- Christians in the American Empire: Faith and Citizenship in the New World Order. Oxford University Press. 2008. ISBN 9780195188097.
