= Santa Clara University School of Law =

Private law school in Santa Clara, California

Coordinates: 37.35115°N 121.93855°W

- Motto: Lawyers Who Lead
- Parent school: Santa Clara University
- Established: 1911
- School type: Private
- Parent endowment: $1.03 billion (2020)
- Dean: Michael J. Kaufman
- Location: Santa Clara, California, US
- Enrollment: 880
- Faculty: 117
- USNWR ranking: 158th (2024)
- Bar pass rate: 67.48% (July 2021, first-time takers)
- Website: law.scu.edu
- ABA profile: Santa Clara University School of Law

The Santa Clara University School of Law (Santa Clara Law) is the law school of Santa Clara University, a Jesuit university in Santa Clara, California, United States, in the Silicon Valley region. The School of Law was founded in 1911.

Santa Clara Law offers a Juris Doctor (J.D.) degree, as well as several double-degree programs, including a J.D./Master of Business Administration (J.D./M.B.A.) and a J.D./Master of Science in Information Systems (MSIS) offered in conjunction with Santa Clara University's Leavey School of Business. In addition, the school offers Master of Laws (LL.M.) degrees in intellectual property law, in U.S. law for foreign lawyers, and in international and comparative law. Santa Clara Law also features specialized curricular programs in high tech and intellectual property law, international law, public interest, social justice law, and is one of few law schools to offer a certificate in privacy law.

== History ==
Santa Clara University School of Law was founded in 1911. The school is part of Santa Clara University (founded 1851), the oldest operating institution of higher learning in California and the oldest Catholic university in the American West. It was approved by the American Bar Association in 1937. It joined the Association of American Law Schools in 1940.

Prior to the requirement that all California law graduates must take the state bar exam, Santa Clara Law was one of the five schools whose graduates were exempt from the examination, along with Boalt Hall, UC Law San Francisco, Stanford, and USC.

== Rankings ==
According to the required disclosures under ABA Section 509, not counting those employed where a JD degree was an advantage, employed in a professional position, and those enrolled in graduate studies, 55% of the Class of 2021 was employed in full-time, long-term positions that require bar admission within nine months of graduation.

Law school rankings of Santa Clara Law include:

- Number 150 overall of 196 ABA-approved law schools in the United States as ranked by U.S. News & World Report

== Bar passage rates ==
Based on a 2001–2007 six-year average, 73% of Santa Clara University Law graduates passed the California State Bar.

== Post-graduation employment ==
According to Santa Clara's official 2025 ABA-required disclosures, 75.25% of the Class of 2025 obtained full-time, long-term, JD-required employment nine months after graduation.

According to the American Bar Association's "Official Guide to ABA-Approved Law Schools," 94.5 percent of Santa Clara students were employed nine months after graduation, with 77 percent of graduates employed in the private sector and 21 percent employed in the public sector.

According to the Princeton Review, the average private-sector starting salary for Santa Clara Law graduates in 2020 is $100,000. According to Forbes magazine, mid-career median salary is currently $188,000 a year.

According to a study done by online salary-information company PayScale, graduates of Santa Clara Law have the third highest mid-career median salary among all graduate programs in the United States. The report found that Santa Clara Law graduates typically make $76,900 the first year following graduation and attain a mid-career median salary of $197,700.

ABA employment summary for 2013 graduates
Employment status	Percentage
Employed - bar passage required	50.0%
Employed - J.D. advantage	20.19%
Employed - professional position	6.83%
Employed - non-professional position	0.31%
Employed - undeterminable	0.0%
Pursuing graduate degree full time	1.55%
Unemployed - start date deferred	0.93%
Unemployed - not seeking	0.31%
Unemployed - seeking	17.7%
Employment status unknown	2.17%
Total of 322 graduates

== Costs ==
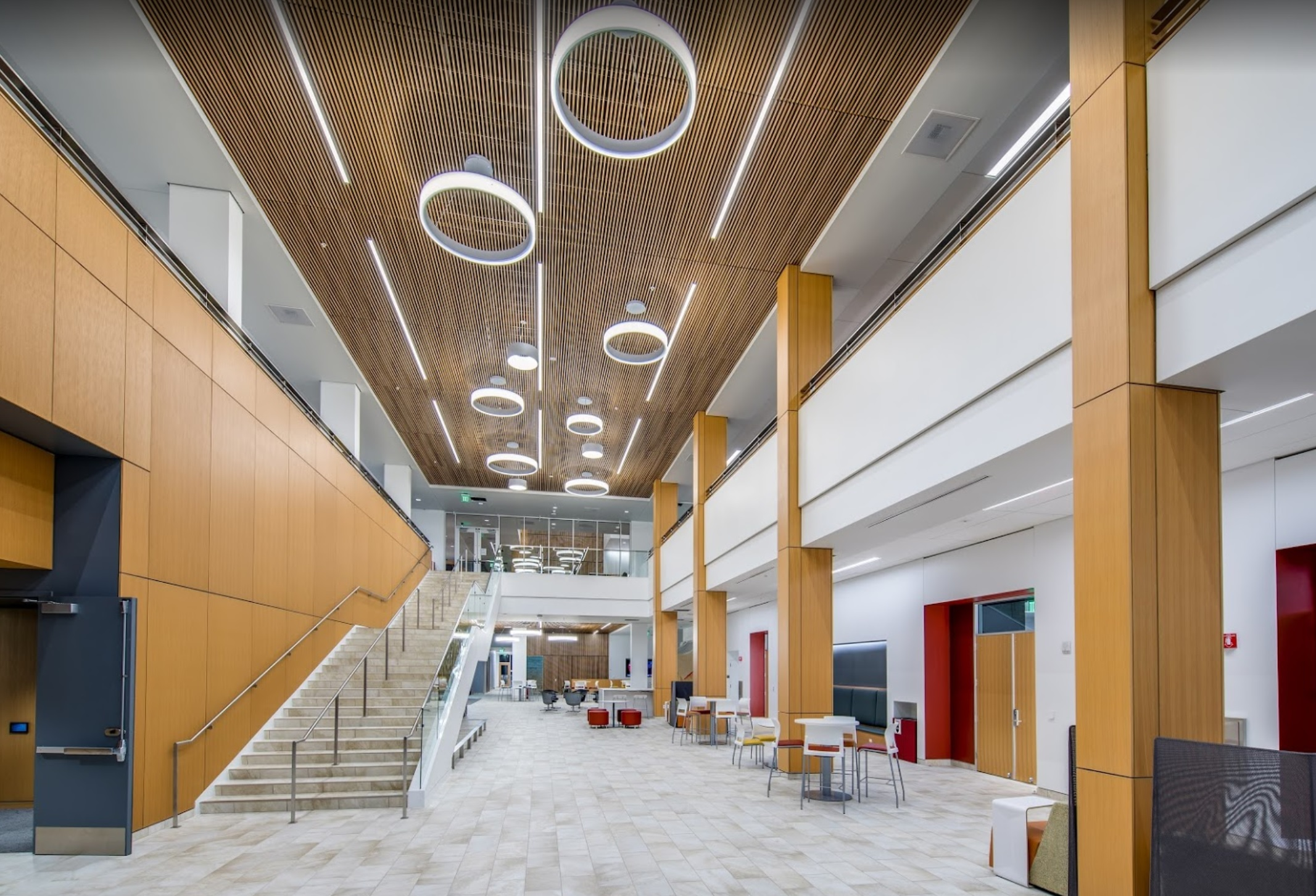
Atrium inside Charney Hall

The total cost of attendance (indicating the cost of tuition, fees, and living expenses) at Santa Clara for the 2026-2027 academic year was $101,724 for first-year law students. The Law School Transparency estimated debt-financed cost of attendance for three years is $262,472.

== Students ==
For the 2025 entering class, the top-five feeder schools into Santa Clara Law in order were UC Berkeley, UC Davis, Santa Clara University, and San Jose State University.

For the 2025 entering class, 2,648 people applied to the School of Law and 213 full-time and 51 part-time students matriculated. The top-five feeder states in order for the 2021 entering class were California, Texas, Nevada, Washington, and Arizona.

For the 2025 entering class, the LSAT scores for entering full-time students were 162 for the 75th percentile and 157 for the 25th percentile. The undergraduate GPA for full-time entering students was 3.73 for the 75th percentile and 3.22 for the 25th percentile.

Santa Clara Law has a chapter of the Order of the Coif, a national law school honorary society founded for the purposes of encouraging legal scholarship and advancing the ethical standards of the legal profession.

== Campus ==
Over the last century, the Santa Clara University campus, located along El Camino Real in Santa Clara, has expanded to more than 104 acres (0.4 km^{2}; 0.2 sq mi). Amid its many Mission-style academic and residential buildings are the historic mission gardens, rose garden, and palm trees.

Until 1939, the law school inhabited present-day St. Joseph's Hall at the center of Santa Clara University's campus. Under the tenure of Dean Edwin Owens, Bergin Hall was constructed and became home to the school in 1939. The new building was built using monies collected through Santa Clara football's successful appearances in the Sugar Bowl and named after Thomas Bergin, Santa Clara's first graduate, a California legal pioneer, and an early donor to the School of Law.

The Edwin Heafey Law Library was constructed in 1963, and expanded in 1973 to include more space for library materials. Heafey was renovated and expanded again in 1988. The collection contains over 400,000 volumes in print and digital formats. Additionally, the library manages an institutional repository which currently contains over 4,000 digital items including a collection of papers related to the Congressional hearings regarding the Watergate Scandal donated by Congressman Don Edwards. Other digital collections include documents relating to litigation over the Patient Protection and Affordable Healthcare Act (also known as Obamacare) and the Hague Convention for the Protection of Cultural Property in the Event of Armed Conflict.

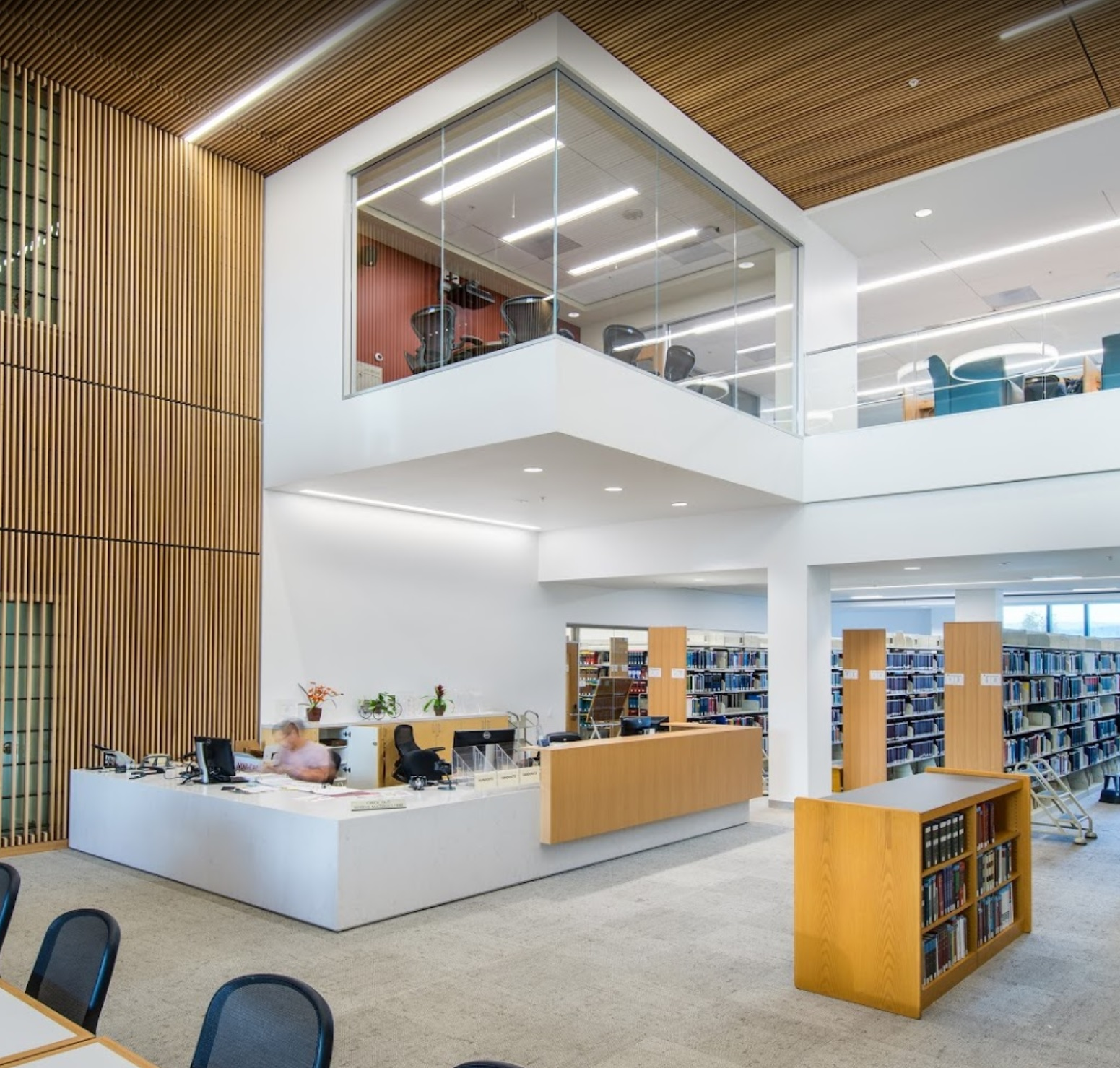
Charney Hall - Law Library Reference Desk

In 1973, Bannan Hall was built, which allocated space for the Law School on the ground floor. In 2008, Dean Donald Polden announced the law school would have exclusive use of Bannan Hall, and the building was renovated and used exclusively by the law school shortly thereafter.

In 2018, the law school moved into Charney Hall, a new $60-million building built specifically to house the law school.

== Notable faculty ==
- David D. Friedman (Professor Emeritus) – author of The Machinery of Freedom
- Eric Goldman – Co-Director of the Datta Center for High Tech Law, author of Technology and Marketing Law Blog
- Ro Khanna (adjunct instructor) – former Deputy Assistant Secretary in the United States Department of Commerce
- Catherine Sandoval – Former member of the U.S. Chemical Safety and Hazard Investigation Board and former Commissioner on the California Public Utilities Commission

== Notable alumni ==
- Elizabeth Birch (1985) – Former board chair of the National Gay and Lesbian Task Force; former Executive Director of the Human Rights Campaign
- Laura Cha (1982) – Former Vice-Chair of the China Securities Regulatory Commission; former Chair of the Hong Kong Stock Exchange
- Marjorie Cohn (1975) – former law school professor; former president of the National Lawyers Guild
- Benjamin Cruz (1975) – former Speaker of the 34th Guam Legislature
- Mike Espy (1978) – former 25th United States Secretary of Agriculture; Member of the U.S. House of Representatives
- Ashley Gjøvik (2022) – former Apple Inc. employee; labor activist and whistleblower
- Phyllis Jean Hamilton (1976) – Judge of the United States District Court for the Northern District of California
- Eugene Michel Hyman (1977) – former Judge of the Santa Clara County Superior Court
- Beth Kerttula (1981) – Minority Leader, Alaska House of Representatives
- Robert J. Lagomarsino (1953) – U.S. Representative for California's 19th District
- Zoe Lofgren (1975) – U.S. Representative for California's 16th congressional district
- Douglas Moylan (1991) – Judge on the Supreme Court of Guam; first elected Attorney General of Guam
- Edward A. Panelli (1956) – Justice of the Supreme Court of California
- Jimmy Panetta (1996) – U.S. Representative for California's 20th congressional district; previously assistant district attorney in Monterey County, California
- Leon Panetta (1963) – former Secretary of Defense; former Director of the Central Intelligence Agency; previously, White House Chief of Staff under Bill Clinton; former member of the U.S. House of Representatives
- Howard Wallace Pollock (1953) – former U.S. Representative for Alaska
- Curren Price (1976) – Senator, California State Senate
- Albert J. Ruffo (1936) – 48th Mayor of San Jose
- Nicole Shanahan (2014) – entrepreneur and former vice presidential candidate
- Mark Stone (1988) – Assemblymember for California's 29th State Assembly district

== Law School deans ==
Timeline of historical events, including previous deans.

- James Campbell – 1911 to 1918
- Lawrence E. O'Keefe, SJ – 1919 to 1920
- Clarence Coolidge – 1920 to 1933
- Edwin J. Owens – 1933 to 1953
- Byron J. Snow – 1953 to 1955
- Warren P. McKenney – 1955 to 1959
- Leo Huard – 1959 to 1969
- George Strong (acting) – 1970
- George Alexander – 1970 to 1985
- Richard Rykoff (acting) – 1985 to 1986
- Gerald Uelmen - 1986 to 1994
- Mack Player – 1994 to 2003
- Donald J. Polden – 2003 to 2013
- Lisa Kloppenberg – 2013 to 2019
- Anna Han (acting) – 2019 to 2021
- Michael J. Kaufman – 2021 to present
