= List of College of the Holy Cross alumni =

This list of College of the Holy Cross alumni includes graduates and non-graduate, former students at the College of the Holy Cross. Since its founding in 1843 and its first commencement in 1849, Holy Cross has graduated 171 classes of students. As of the 2019–20 academic year, Holy Cross had approximately 38,511 alumni.

== Artists, poets and authors ==
- Vito Acconci 1962, artist and architect
- Philip Berrigan 1950, author and activist
- Billy Collins 1963, former Poet Laureate of the United States
- Leo Cullum 1963, cartoonist best known for his work in The New Yorker
- Michael Earls 1895, Jesuit priest, writer, poet, teacher, and Holy Cross administrator
- Michael Harrington 1947, socialist historian and author of The Other America, which is believed to have inspired Lyndon Johnson's Great Society social programs
- Michael Harvey 1980, author of The Chicago Way and The Fifth Floor; co-creator of the TV program Cold Case Files
- Jack Higgins 1976, Pulitzer Prize–winning editorial cartoonist for the Chicago Sun Times
- Kristan Higgins, romance author
- Edward P. Jones 1972, MacArthur Award winner and 2004 Pulitzer Prize for Fiction for his novel The Known World
- Paul LeClerc 1963, president emeritus of the New York Public Library
- Jack O'Connell 1981, author of noir crime fiction and speculative fiction
- Karen M. McManus 1991, author
- Joe McGinniss 1964, author of The Selling of the President, Fatal Vision, and other books
- Jay O'Callahan 1960, storyteller
- Josh Pahigian 1996, author of The Ultimate Baseball Road Trip and more than a dozen other books
- Barry Reed 1949, Boston trial lawyer and author of The Verdict

== Business ==
- William J. Abbott 1984, CEO of GAC Media
- Douglas M. Baker Jr. 1981, CEO of Ecolab Inc.
- James E. Burke 1947, former CEO of Johnson & Johnson; named one of the ten greatest CEOs of all time by Fortune Magazine
- Randall Caudill 1969, president and founder of Dunsford Hill Capital Partners
- Richard A. Davey 1995, president, New York City Transit Authority
- Joanna Geraghty 1990, chief executive officer of JetBlue
- Pedro Heilbron 1979, CEO of Copa Airlines
- Abraham Elias Issa 1926, Jamaican businessman, entrepreneur and hotelier
- Joey Issa 1989, founder of Cool Group
- Brian P. Kelley 1983, chairman of MPearlRock, former CEO of Keurig Green Mountain and former president of the Coca-Cola Company’s North American operations
- James W. Keyes 1977, former chairman and CEO of Blockbuster, Inc.
- John Koelmel 1974, president of HARBORcenter, former CEO of First Niagara Financial Group
- William J. McDonough 1956, former president of the Federal Reserve Bank of New York and current vice chairman of Merrill Lynch
- William E. McKenna 1947, former president of Hunts Foods, former chairman Norton Simon Inc. Former chairman and President Technicolor Inc. Former chairman Sambos Rest.
- Charles E.F. Millard 1954, former chairman of the board, CEO Coca-Cola Bottling Company of New York
- William F. O'Neil 1907, founder of the General Tire and Rubber Company
- John Peterman 1963 (aka J. Peterman), catalog and retail entrepreneur
- James David Power III 1953, founder of J.D. Power and Associates
- Roberto Quarta 1971, partner of Clayton, Dubilier & Rice, Chairman of Italtel, and former chairman of BBA Group
- Loren Ferré Rangel 1992, vice president for new products at El Día, Inc. and a trustee of the Conservation Trust of Puerto Rico
- Frank Shakespeare 1946, former president of CBS Television; former director of the U.S. Information Agency; ambassador to Portugal and ambassador to the Vatican
- Joe Shoen 1971, president, chairman of the board, and chief executive officer of U-Haul
- Mark Shoen 1967, largest shareholder and former chairman of U-Haul
- Kieran Suckling 1986, co-founder of the Center for Biological Diversity
- Maggie Wilderotter 1977, former president and CEO, Frontier Communications and DocuSign

== Education ==
=== Professors and researchers ===
| Name | Year/degree | Notability | Reference |
|---|---|---|---|
| John E. Brooks | 1949 | President Emeritus of College of the Holy Cross and former president from 1970 to 1994, noted for introducing co-education at the college in 1972; member of Religious Studies faculty | |
| Robert L. Devaney | 1969 | Professor of mathematics at Boston University; research interests include complex dynamical systems, chaos, fractals | |
| David Granfield | 1943 | Professor Emeritus at Catholic University Law School in Washington DC; noted as a canon lawyer for his exposition of the Catholic Church's view on abortion | |
| Jane M. Hawkins | 1976 | Professor of mathematics at the University of North Carolina, Chapel Hill; research interests include ergodic theory, smooth dynamical systems, complex dynamics, and computer generated graphics images related to nonpolynomial dynamics | |
| Patrick Francis Healy | 1850 | first African American to earn a Ph.D. and former president of Georgetown University | |
| Traugott Lawler | 1958 | medievalist scholar; expert on William Langland; emeritus professor of English at Yale University | |
| Timothy Leary | 1942 | LSD-pioneering Harvard professor; attended Holy Cross before transferring to West Point | |
| Joseph McCartin | 1981 | professor of history at Georgetown University; 2003 Charles Warren Fellow at Harvard University | |
| James McCarthy | 1971 | President of Suffolk University in Boston | |
| Paul Reiss | 1952 | 14th president of Saint Michael's College, professor and author | |
| Robert K. Wright Jr. | 1968 | military historian and author | |

== Arts and entertainment ==
- Dick Cusack 1950, actor, director and producer
- Ann Dowd 1978, stage, film, and television actress
- Brian Gallivan 1991, improvisational actor and executive producer of The McCarthys
- Thomas Ian Griffith 1982, actor, screenwriter, producer, musician, and martial artist
- Brian Gunn 1992, screenwriter
- Mark Gunn 1993, screenwriter
- Dave Holmes 1994, MTV host
- Neil Hopkins 1999, television and film actor and writer
- Peter Jankowski 1986, executive producer, Law & Order
- Douglas Netter 1942, founder, Netter Digital Entertainment and executive producer of Babylon 5
- Kevin O'Connor 1990, host of PBS's This Old House
- Thomas F. O'Neil 1937, former chairman of RKO General Studios, who brought movies to television and experimented with an early coin-operated pay TV system
- Bartlett Sher 1981, director of Broadway musicals South Pacific and The Light in the Piazza
- Tony Wolf 1993, actor
- Bob Wright 1965, chairman of the board and former CEO of NBC Universal; Vice Chairman of General Electric; co-founder of Autism Speaks

== Law, politics, and public service ==
=== United States federal and state court justices ===
| Name | Year/degree | Notability | Reference |
|---|---|---|---|
| Andrew Augustine Caffrey | 1941 | United States district judge for the District of Massachusetts; nominated by President Dwight D. Eisenhower in 1961 | |
| Francis Patrick O'Connor | 1950 | Appointed by Governor Edward King in 1981, served 16 years on the Massachusetts Supreme Judicial Court | |
| Christopher Droney | 1976 | United States Court of Appeals judge for the Second Circuit; nominated by President Barack Obama in 2012 | |
| Conrad K. Cyr | 1953 | Judge of the United States Court of Appeals for the First Circuit | |
| John J. Farley, III | 1964 | Founding judge of the United States Court of Appeals for Veterans Claims; nominated by President George H. W. Bush in 1989 | |
| J. Philip Calabrese | 1993 | Judge of the United States District Court for the Northern District of Ohio | |
| Wendell Arthur Garrity Jr. | 1941 | United States district judge for the District of Massachusetts; nominated by President Lyndon B. Johnson in 1966 | |
| John J. Gibbons | 1947 | Former chief judge of the United States Court of Appeals, Third Circuit | |
| John Greaney | 1961 | Associate justice for the Supreme Judicial Court of Massachusetts, director of the Macaronis Institute for Trial and Appellate Advocacy at Suffolk University Law School | |
| Edward Francis Harrington | 1955 | United States district judge for the District of Massachusetts; nominated by President Ronald Reagan in 1987 | |
| James Patrick Leamy | 1912 | United States district judge for the District of Vermont; nominated by President Franklin D. Roosevelt in 1940 | |
| Richard J. Leon | 1971 | United States district judge for the District of Columbia; nominated by President George W. Bush in 2002 | |
| William T. McCarthy | 1905 | United States district judge for the District of Massachusetts; nominated by President Harry S. Truman | |
| Edward McEntee | 1928 | Judge of the United States Court of Appeals for the First Circuit. | |
| Matthew Francis McGuire | 1921 | United States district judge for the District of Massachusetts; nominated by President Harry S. Truman in 1949 | |
| Clarence Thomas | 1971 | Associate justice, United States Supreme Court; nominated by President George H. W. Bush in 1990 | |

=== Executive branch and United States Cabinet members ===
- Joseph A. Califano Jr. 1952, former U.S. secretary of Health, Education, and Welfare; chairman of the National Center on Addiction and Substance Abuse
- Broderick D. Johnson 1978, White House cabinet secretary for President Obama
- John William Middendorf II 1945, former U.S. ambassador to the Netherlands and secretary of the Navy

=== Members of the United States Congress ===
==== Senators ====
| Name | Year/degree | Notability | Reference |
|---|---|---|---|
| Robert P. Casey Jr. | 1982 | United States senator for Pennsylvania, served as Pennsylvania treasurer | |
| Peter Welch | 1969 | United States senator for Vermont, served as United States representative for Vermont's at-large district from 2007 to 2023 | |
| John A. Durkin | 1959 | United States senator for New Hampshire 1975–1980 | |
| Thomas A. Burke | 1920 | United States senator for Ohio, served as the 48th mayor of Cleveland; namesake of Cleveland Burke Lakefront Airport | |
| Maurice J. Murphy | 1950 | United States senator for New Hampshire | |
| David I. Walsh | 1893 | United States senator for Massachusetts; Massachusetts' first Irish Catholic governor | |

==== Representatives ====
| Name | Year/degree | Notability | Reference |
|---|---|---|---|
| Tim Bishop | 1972 | United States representative from New York's 1st congressional district | |
| William P. Connery Jr. | 1920 | United States representative from Massachusetts | |
| Joseph Daniel Early | 1955 | United States representative from Massachusetts' 3rd congressional district 1975–1993 | |
| Mark DeSaulnier | 1974 | United States representative from California | |
| Ambrose Kennedy | 1897 | United States representative from Rhode Island | |
| James B. Longley Jr. | 1973 | United States representative from Maine's 1st congressional district | |
| Martin B. McKneally | 1937 | United States representative from New York | |
| Michael R. McNulty | 1969 | United States representative | |
| James P. Moran Jr. | 1967 | United States representative | |
| Frank William Towey Jr. | 1916 | United States representative from New Jersey's 12th congressional district 1937–1939 | |

=== United States governors ===
- Bob Casey Sr. 1953, Governor of Pennsylvania 1987–1995
- Edward D. DiPrete 1955, Governor of Rhode Island 1985–1991
- David I. Walsh 1893, first Irish Catholic governor and U.S. senator for Massachusetts

=== Ambassadors and other diplomats from the United States ===
- Christopher P. Henzel, 1984 U.S. ambassador to Yemen
- John William Middendorf II 1945, former U.S. ambassador to the Netherlands and secretary of the Navy
- Harry K. Thomas Jr. 1978, U.S. ambassador to Bangladesh, the Philippines, and Zimbabwe

=== Foreign government officials ===
- Henri Bourassa 1890, French Canadian political leader and publisher; ideological father of French-Canadian nationalism
- Guillermo Felipe Pérez-Argüello 1973, Nicaraguan diplomat, nephew of Javier Perez de Cuellar
- Louis-Rodrigue Masson 1853, Canadian member of Parliament, senator, and Lieutenant-Governor of Quebec
- Jarosław Wałęsa 2001, member of the Sejm, the lower chamber of Poland's Parliament; son of Lech Wałęsa

=== Other United States political and legal figures ===
- Liz Beretta-Perik, chairwoman of the Rhode Island Democratic Party
- Jose Cojuangco Jr. 1955, former Philippine congressman
- Michael Delaney 1991, New Hampshire attorney general 2009–present
- Mark DeSaulnier 1973, representing California's 7th State Senate district
- Christopher Doherty, 1980, Mayor of Scranton, Pennsylvania, since 2002
- Daniel M. Donahue 2009, Massachusetts state representative in the 16th Worcester district
- John Droney 1968, participated in Connecticut state politics; senior partner of Levy & Droney
- Jon Favreau 2003, chief speechwriter for Barack Obama
- Joseph H. Gainer 1899, 26th mayor of Providence, Rhode Island
- William Glendon 1941, attorney who specialized in issues relating to the First Amendment to the United States Constitution and represented The Washington Post in the Pentagon Papers case
- Kirby Hendee, Wisconsin state senator
- Joseph T. Higgins 1916, member of the New York State Assembly
- Robert Maheu 1939, lawyer, worked for the FBI and CIA, chief executive of Nevada operations for Howard Hughes
- Ed Martin 1992, U.S. Pardon Attorney, Department of Justice and former chairman of the Missouri Republican Party
- John N. McMahon, 1951,Deputy Director of the Central Intelligence Agency
- Joseph A. McNamara, U.S. attorney for Vermont
- Howard C. Nolan Jr. 1954, former member of the New York State Senate
- John P. O'Brien 1894, former mayor of New York City
- Mark Kennedy Shriver 1986, former member of Maryland legislature, vice president and managing director of US Programs for Save the Children
- Thomas J. Spellacy 1889, political leader and lawyer
- Kathy Sullivan 1976, attorney and former chairwoman of the New Hampshire Democratic Party
- Jane Sullivan Roberts 1976, leads the in-house practice group at Major, Lindsey & Africa; wife of Chief Justice John Roberts
- Austin J. Tobin 1925, former director of the Port Authority of New York and New Jersey 1942–1972; oversaw the construction of the World Trade Center
- Ted Wells 1972, lawyer, rated by The National Law Journal as one of America's best white-collar defense attorneys
- Edward Bennett Williams 1941, trial attorney; former owner of Baltimore Orioles and the Washington Redskins
- James Assion Wright 1923, lawyer from Pennsylvania who served in the U.S. Congress 1941–1945
- Helen Slottje 1989, attorney, winner of Goldman Environmental Prize ('Green Nobel') North America 2014 for work leading to a ban on fracking (unconventional gas drilling) in New York State.

=== Military ===
- Thomas P. Maguire 1969, Adjutant General of New York

== Media and communication ==
- Dave Anderson 1951, New York Times sports columnist, 1981 winner of the Pulitzer Prize for commentary
- George-Édouard Desbarats 1850, Canadian printer and inventor
- Chris Matthews 1967, host of MSNBC's Hardball with Chris Matthews and NBC's The Chris Matthews Show
- Gordon Peterson 1960, broadcast journalist and television news anchor; co-anchor for ABC affiliate WJLA-TV and moderator and producer of Inside Washington
- Dan Shaughnessy 1975, sports columnist for the Boston Globe
- Bill Simmons 1992, HBO sports personality, founder of The Ringer, founder of Grantland and formerly ESPN sports columnist and podcaster (Page 2 and The BS report), founder and co-creator of ESPN hit documentary series 30 for 30
- Ed Walsh 1969, WBZ NewsRadio 1030-AM, morning news anchor

== Religion ==
| Name | Year/degree | Notability | Reference |
|---|---|---|---|
| Most Rev. James Augustine Healy, D.D. | 1849 | First African American bishop in the United States | |
| Most Rev. Frederick Anthony Donaghy, M.M., D.D. | 1925 | Maryknoll missionary to China who became the first bishop of Wuzhou; his brother, William A. Donaghy, S.J., served as the president of Holy Cross | |
| Rev. William O'Malley, S.J. | 1953 | Prolific author and teacher of theology at Fordham University; famous for his role in The Exorcist | |
| Msgr. Peter Vaghi | 1970 | Pastor of the Church of the Little Flower in Bethesda, Maryland and chaplain of The John Carroll Society in Washington, D.C. | |

== Science, technology, and medicine ==
- Arthur L. Beaudet, M.D. 1963, Henry and Emma Meyer Professor; chair of Department of Molecular and Human Genetics, Baylor College of Medicine; known for his pioneering work in gene therapy, particularly the muscular dystrophy gene
- Edward Bove, M.D. 1968, professor of Surgery at the University of Michigan School of Medicine, recognized for his contributions to the repair of congenital heart defects
- James William Colbert Jr., M.D. 1942, first provost of Medical University of South Carolina; dean emeritus of St. Louis University School of Medicine
- James J. Collins, Ph.D. 1987, Rhodes Scholar, 2003 MacArthur Fellow and Termeer Professor of Medical Engineering & Science at MIT
- Bill Diamond, 1978, president and CEO of SETI Institute Research Organization
- John P. Donohue, M.D. 1954, pioneered the development of chemotherapy and nerve sparing surgical techniques for testicular cancer
- Anthony Fauci, M.D. 1962, former head of the National Institute of Allergy and Infectious Diseases, National Institutes of Health
- Thomas W. Hungerford, 1959, mathematician and author of many textbooks including Abstract algebra
- Joseph P. Kerwin, M.D. 1953, astronaut who spent 28 days in space for the Skylab 2 mission
- David McDowell, B.A., M.A., M.D. 1985, psychiatrist, author, expert on substance abuse treatment
- Joseph E. Murray, M.D. 1940, Nobel Prize in Medicine for the first successful kidney transplant
- William Nolen, M.D. 1950, surgeon and author
- James Augustine Shannon, M.D. 1925, former director of the National Institutes of Health
- Chester L. Sutula Ph.D. 1954, chemist served on several APS committees
- Gordon Zubrod, M.D. 1936, received the Lasker Award in 1972 for his work in cancer research

== Sports ==
=== Baseball ===
- Brian Abraham 2007, World Series Champion with the Boston Red Sox
- John Joseph "Jack" Barry 1905, shortstop, second baseman, and manager in Major League Baseball, and later a renowned college baseball coach
- Dick Berardino 1957, player development consultant for the Boston Red Sox
- Matt Blake 2007, New York Yankees pitching coach
- Pat Bourque 1969, first baseman in Major League Baseball; played on the 1973 Oakland Athletic World Series Championship team
- Ownie Carroll 1925, Major League Baseball pitcher for eleven seasons; baseball coach at Seton Hall 1948–1972
- Declan Cronin 2019, Major League Baseball pitcher for Chicago White Sox and Miami Marlins
- Gene Desautels 1930, catcher in Major League Baseball who played with four different teams between 1930 and 1946
- Joseph "Jumping Joe" Dugan 1920, Major League Baseball player
- John Freeman 1927, played for the Boston Red Sox
- Jack Hoey 1903, MLB outfielder for the Boston Red Sox
- Dick Joyce 1965, major league pitcher; member of the Cheverus and Holy Cross Hall of Fame; member of Maine Baseball Hall of Fame
- Art Kenney 1938, LHP in MLB Boston Bees 1938 (Braves) Holy Cross Hall of Fame (2011)
- Brendan King 2017, RHP drafted by the Chicago Cubs
- Bill Lefebvre 1938, homered in first at-bat as a professional baseball player
- Jack McKeon 1952, manager for the World Series Champion Florida Marlins
- Doc McMahon 1908, pitcher who played for the Boston Red Sox in their inaugural season
- Bill Mills 1944, catcher for the 1944 Philadelphia Athletics
- Joe Mulligan 1934, MLB pitcher for the Boston Red Sox
- Pete Naton, 1953, catcher for the 1953 Pittsburgh Pirates
- Al Niemiec 1933, second baseman for the Boston Red Sox and Philadelphia Athletics
- James O'Neill 1952, pitcher; won 1952 College World Series Most Outstanding Player award
- Mike Pazik 1972, drafted by the New York Yankees
- Louis Sockalexis Prep-1897, first Native American player in major league baseball

=== Basketball ===
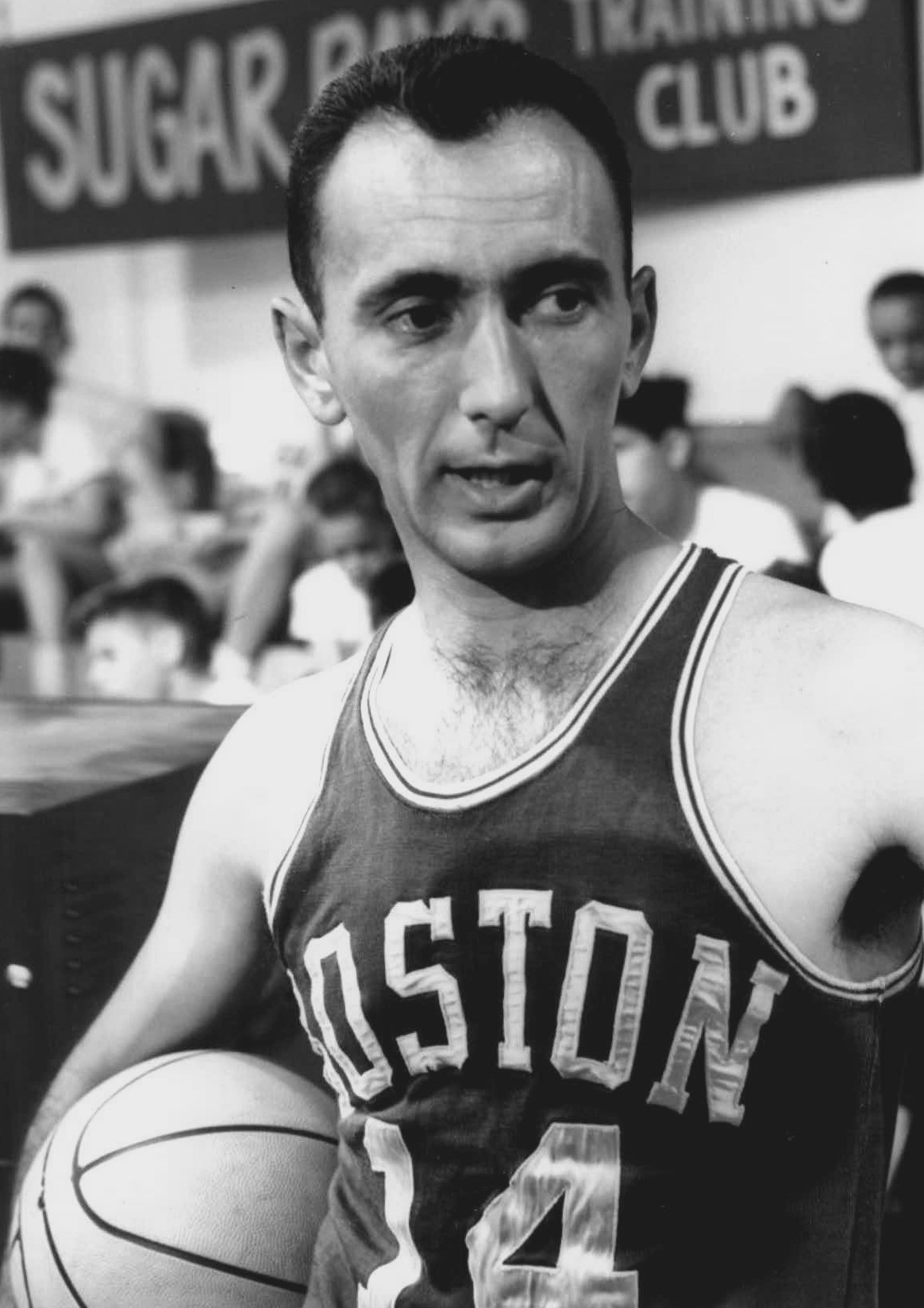
Bob Cousy

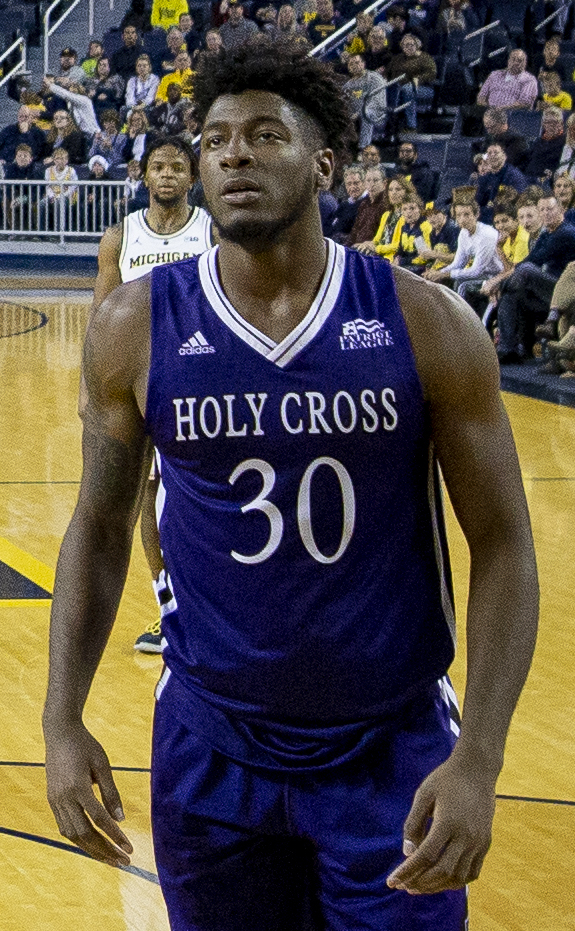
Jehyve Floyd

- Rod Baker 1974, head coach for the ABA Champion Rochester Razorsharks
- George Blaney 1961, college basketball coach and former player for the New York Knicks
- Bob Cousy 1950, Basketball Hall of Fame member; former Boston Celtics player and coach
- Jehyve Floyd (born 1997), basketball player in the Israeli Basketball Premier League
- Jack Foley 1962, consensus All-American who played for the Boston Celtics and the New York Knicks.
- Kevin Hamilton 2006, professional basketball player and member of the Puerto Rican National Team
- Tom Heinsohn 1956, Basketball Hall of Fame member and former Boston Celtics player and coach
- George Kaftan 1948, retired NBA player; member of the New England Basketball Hall of Fame and the Holy Cross Varsity Club Hall of Fame
- Malcolm Miller 2015, first player to sign a two-way contract with the Toronto Raptors and won NBA championship
- Joe Mullaney 1949, drafted by the Boston Celtics and former head coach of the Los Angeles Lakers
- Dermie O'Connell 1948, former NBA guard
- Togo Palazzi 1954, played six seasons in the NBA; captain of the Crusaders team that won the 1954 NIT Championship
- Keith Simmons 2007, professional basketball player
- Torey Thomas 2006, member of the New York Knicks
- Michael Vicens 1978, drafted by the New Jersey Nets and played for Puerto Rico in the Olympics
- Garry Witts 1981, former NBA player

=== Football ===
- Bill Adams 1972, former offensive guard in the NFL for the Buffalo Bills
- Daniel Adams 2006, linebacker for 2007 champion United States national American football team
- Clyde Christensen, football coach at Holy Cross, later coached in the NFL
- Jalen Coker 2024, wide receiver for the Carolina Panthers
- Kevin Coyle, football coach at Holy Cross, later coached in the NFL
- Bob Dee 1955, three-sport letterman at the College of the Holy Cross; one of the first players signed by the Boston Patriots
- Mark Duffner, football head coach at Holy Cross, later coached in the NFL
- Fred Farrier 1994, wide receiver at Holy Cross
- Gill Fenerty 1986, award-winning all-star running back with the CFL Toronto Argonauts and later with the NFL New Orleans Saints
- Chandler Fenner 2012, Super Bowl champion as well as CFL Grey Cup Winner
- Dave Fipp, football coach at Holy Cross, later coached in the NFL
- C. J. Hanson 2024, drafted as a guard by the Kansas City Chiefs
- Lee Hull 1988, NFL wide receiver coach for the Indianapolis Colts
- Ed Jenkins 1972, wide receiver for the Miami Dolphins, Buffalo Bills, and New York Giants
- Bruce Kozerski 1984, played center for the Cincinnati Bengals for twelve seasons
- Gordon Lockbaum 1988, College Football Hall of Fame member
- Anthony Manfreda 1929, played in the NFL; holds the Holy Cross record for most yards gained in a kickoff return
- Mike McCabe 2012, offensive lineman signed by the Green Bay Packers; his father played for the Washington Redskins
- Jim Moran 1934, guard in the National Football League for the Boston Redskins; father of James P. Moran Jr.
- Jon Morris 1964, All-American center; named to the second team, All-Time All-AFL for his years playing for the Boston Patriots
- Jimmy Murray 2018, offensive lineman signed by the Kansas City Chiefs 2019, 2020, 2021 Offensive Lineman New York Jets
- Andy Natowich 1940, former running back in the National Football League for the Washington Redskins
- Luke Newman 2024, guard drafted by the Chicago Bears
- Bill Osmanski 1939, Chicago Bears fullback, member of the NFL 1940s All-Decade Team, the College Football Hall of Fame, and a licensed dentist
- Vince Promuto 1960, Washington Redskins guard 1960–1970
- George Pyne II 1931, played for the Providence Steamrollers; the Pynes were the first family to have three generations play professional football
- David Quehl 1976, drafted by New England Patriots and played in the CFL
- Dominic Randolph 2010, Walter Payton Award candidate and QB for the New York Giants
- Kalif Raymond 2016, wide receiver and punt returner for the Chicago Bears
- Mike Sherman, football coach at Holy Cross, later coached in the NFL
- Benton Whitley 2022, outside linebacker Los Angeles Rams
- Jim Zyntell 1933, offensive lineman in the National Football League

=== Ice hockey ===
- Naemi Herzig 2027, won a bronze medal in the 2026 Olympics games
- Liam McLinskey 2025, Hobey Baker top ten finalist and drafted in the AHL
- Patrick Rissmiller 2002, New Jersey Devils coach and has played in the NHL for the San Jose Sharks, New York Rangers, and Atlanta Thrashers
- Jim Stewart 1979, goaltender, Boston Bruins

=== Other sports ===
- Frank Carroll 1960, Olympic figure skating coach, former competitive skater
- Bob Daughters 1936, MLB player and former president of the Holy Cross Varsity Club
- Neil Fingleton 2004, the United Kingdom's tallest British-born man, professional basketball player, actor, and clothing retailer
- Keitani Graham 2003, competed in London 2012 Olympic Games as a wrestler for Micronesia
- Paul Harney 1952, professional golfer and golf course owner; won 11 professional events including six on the PGA Tour; in 2005, enshrined into the PGA of America Hall of Fame
- Leo Larrivee 1925, winner of bronze medal in 3000 m team at the 1924 Summer Olympics
- Patrick McCann, 2013, professional soccer player for Finn Harps FC
- Alejandro Melean 2010, professional soccer player for the Bolivian club Oriente Petrolero
- Paul Pearl 1989, men's ice hockey head coach at Holy Cross
- James F. "Jimmy" Quinn 1928, winner of gold medal in 4 × 100 m relay at the 1928 Summer Olympics
- Richard Regan 1976, athletic director at Holy Cross; former operations director of NFL International
- Kevin Swords 1982, most "capped" player on the Eagles, the U.S. national rugby team; played in the 1987 World Cup Rugby and captained the US team in the 1991 World Cup
- Willie Turnesa 1938, known as "Willie the Wedge", one of 13 men who have won both the British Amateur (1947) and U.S. Amateur Championships (1938, 1948)
- Ralph Willard 1967, former NBA coach; head coach of the Holy Cross basketball team

== Notable Holy Cross faculty ==
- Patricia Bizzell, Ph.D., prolific author and former chairperson of the English Department
- John Esposito, Ph.D., widely published professor of Islamic Studies; former Holy Cross Middle East Studies and Religious Studies Chair
- Osvaldo Golijov, Ph.D., Grammy Award-winning composer; assistant professor of music
- André K Isaacs, Ph.D., organic chemistry professor; social media celebrity
- Claudia Koonz, Ph.D., feminist historian of Nazi Germany
- Shirish Korde, Ph.D., composer; chair of the Music Department; founder of Neuma Records
- Joseph T. O'Callahan, first chaplain Medal of Honor recipient; former director of Holy Cross Mathematics Department
- Thomas Worcester, historian on the Catholic Church and the Papacy, current president of Regis College, Toronto

== Presidents of the college ==
| Order | Name | Position(s) | Joined college | Ascended presidency | Left/retired | Alumnus/na? | Reference |
|---|---|---|---|---|---|---|---|
| 1 | Rev. Thomas F. Mulledy, S.J. | President | 1843 | 1843 | 1845 | no | |
| 2 | Rev. James A. Ryder, S.J. | President | | 1845 | 1848 | | |
| 3 | Rev. John Early, S.J. | President | | 1848 | 1851 | | |
| 4 | Rev. Anthony F. Ciampi, S.J. | President | | 1851 | 1854 | | |
| 5 | Rev. Peter J. Blenkinsop, S.J. | President | | 1854 | 1857 | | |
| 6 | Rev. Anthony F. Ciampi, S.J. | President | | 1857 | 1861 | | |
| 7 | Rev. James Clark, S.J. | President | | 1861 | 1867 | | |
| 8 | Rev. Robert W. Brady, S.J. | President | | 1867 | 1869 | | |
| 9 | Rev. Anthony F. Ciampi, S.J. | President | | 1869 | 1873 | | |
| 10 | Rev. Joseph B. O'Hagan, S.J. | President | | 1873 | 1878 | | |
| 11 | Rev. Edward D. Boone, S.J. | President | | 1878 | 1883 | | |
| 12 | Rev. Robert W. Brady, S.J. | President | | 1883 | 1887 | | |
| 13 | Rev. Samuel Cahill, S.J. | President | | 1887 | 1889 | | |
| 14 | Rev. Michael O'Kane, S.J. | President | | 1889 | 1893 | | |
| 15 | Rev. Edward A. McGurk, S.J. | President | | 1893 | 1895 | | |
| 16 | Rev. John F. Lehy, S.J. | President | | 1895 | 1901 | | |
| 17 | Rev. Joseph F. Hanselman, S.J. | President | | 1901 | 1906 | | |
| 18 | Rev. Thomas E. Murphy, S.J. | President | | 1906 | 1911 | | |
| 19 | Bishop Joseph N. Dinand, S.J. | President | | 1911 | 1918 | | |
| 20 | Rev. James J. Carlin, S.J. | President | | 1918 | 1924 | | |
| 21 | Bishop Joseph N. Dinand, S.J. | President | | 1924 | 1927 | | |
| 22 | Rev. John M. Fox, S.J. | President | | 1927 | 1933 | | |
| 23 | Rev. Francis J. Dolan, S.J. | President | | 1933 | 1939 | | |
| 24 | Rev. Joseph R.N. Maxwell, S.J. | President | | 1939 | 1945 | | |
| 25 | Rev. William J. Healy, S.J. | President | | 1945 | 1948 | | |
| 26 | Rev. John A. O'Brien, S.J. | President | | 1948 | 1954 | | |
| 27 | Rev. William A. Donaghy, S.J. | President | | 1954 | 1960 | | |
| 28 | Rev. Raymond J. Swords, S.J. | President | | 1960 | 1970 | | |
| 29 | Rev. John E. Brooks, S.J. | President | | 1970 | 1994 | | |
| 30 | Rev. Gerard Reedy, S.J. | President | | 1994 | 1998 | | |
| | Frank Vellaccio, Ph.D. | Acting President | | 1998 | 2000 | | |
| 31 | Rev. Michael C. McFarland, S.J. | President | | 2000 | 2012 | | |
| 32 | Rev. Philip L. Boroughs, S.J. | President | | 2012 | | | |
