= Caudill =

Caudill is a surname. Notable people with the surname include:

- Bill Caudill (born 1956), American baseball player
- Harry M. Caudill (1922–1990), American writer, historian and lawyer
- Randall Caudill, American businessman
- Rebecca Caudill (1899–1985), American writer
- Virginia Caudill (born 1960), American convicted murderer
- Walter C. Caudill (1888–1963), Virginia physician and legislator
- William Abel Caudill (1920–1972), American medical anthropologist
