= Rangel =

Rangel (Portuguese pronunciation: [ʁɐ̃ˈʒɛl], Spanish pronunciation: [raŋˈxel]) is a surname of Portuguese origin.

Rangel is a toponymic surname. The origin of the term is uncertain but French And Germanic roots are discussed, one are from the German "ragin-walt" - a mighty ruler. Other theory about the origin of surname is the Rang a commune in the Doubs department in the Bourgogne-Franche-Comté region in eastern France. Place where the estate would have been named after this place in Portugal with the addition of the suffix EL The Surname came from the estate of “Ronge or Range”, later Rangel, located in Ribeira de Coselhas, Coimbra Portugal. It belonged to Gundisalvus and was taken from the Moors, during the siege of Coimbra in 1117 in the Christian reconquest of the Iberian Peninsula. The surname is found in Portugal, Spain, Germany, France, England, United States, Brazil, Venezuela, Mexico, Russia, East Timor, and Angola.

In places like Mexico the surname is strictly linked to the Spanish branch of the surname during colonial ages, in other places are the original Portuguese branch. In Rhode Island, Massachusetts, Hawaii, New England in general and in The United Kingdom the surname is closely related to recent Portuguese migrations.

== Notable people with this name ==
- Alan Rangel, Mexican baseball pitcher
- Ana Maria Rangel, Brazilian politician and Progressive Republican Party candidate in the 2006 Brazilian presidential election
- Àngel Rangel, Spanish former football player who played for Swansea City
- Arturo Soto Rangel, Mexican film, television, and stage actor
- Beatrice Rangel, Venezuelan writer and politician
- Beatriz Paredes Rangel, Mexican politician affiliated with the Institutional Revolutionary Party
- Carlos Rangel, Venezuelan writer, liberal, journalist, and diplomat
- Carlos Rangel Garbiras, Venezuelan physician and politician
- Charles Rangel (1930–2025), American politician
- David Rangel, Mexican football (soccer) player
- David Rangel Pastor, Spanish football player currently playing for CD Castellón
- Domingo Alberto Rangel, Venezuelan writer, journalist, and founder of the Revolutionary Left Movement
- Eleazar Díaz Rangel, Venezuelan journalist and director of the Últimas Noticias newspaper
- Esdras Rangel, Mexican football (soccer) goalkeeper
- Francisco Rangel Gómez, Venezuelan politician and governor of Bolívar
- Garret Rangel, American football player
- Godofredo Rangel, Brazilian writer
- Gustavo Rangel Briceño, Venezuelan military officer and ex. Defense Minister
- Henry Rangel Silva, Venezuelan military general, ex. Defense Minister, and governor of Trujillo
- Irma Lerma Rangel (d. 2003), member of the Texas House of Representatives
- José Vicente Rangel, Venezuelan leftist politician
- José Vicente Rangel Ávalos, Venezuelan politician and vice minister of the Ministry of Interior, Justice and Peace
- Juana Rangel de Cuellar, founder of Cúcuta, Colombia
- Julio César Rangel, Colombian road cyclist
- Leonel Godoy Rangel, Mexican lawyer, politician, and the current governor of Michoacán
- Licinio Rangel (1936–2002), bishop of the Roman Catholic Diocese of Campos in Brazil
- Loren Ferré Rangel, trustee of the Conservation Trust of Puerto Rico
- Rafael Rangel, Venezuelan microbiologist
- Rafael Rangel Sostmann, president of the Monterrey Institute of Technology and Higher Education in Mexico
- Rubén Rangel (born 1977), Venezuelan road cyclist
- Víctor Rangel Ayala, Mexican footballer
