= Copper-catalyzed allylic substitution =

Organometallic chemical reaction

Copper-catalyzed allylic substitutions are chemical reactions with unique regioselectivity compared to other transition-metal-catalyzed allylic substitutions such as the Tsuji-Trost reaction. They involve copper catalysts and "hard" carbon nucleophiles. The mechanism of copper-catalyzed allylic substitutions involves the coordination of copper to the olefin, oxidative addition and reductive elimination. Enantioselective versions of these reactions have been used in the synthesis of complex molecules, such as (R)-(-)-sporochnol and (S)-(-)-zearalenone.

== Features ==
The two possible regioisomers produced from transition-metal-catalyzed allylic substitutions. Copper-catalyzed reactions typically yield the isomer highlighted in red.

Copper-catalyzed allylic substitutions are characterized by their unique regioselectivity compared to other transition-metal-catalyzed allylic substitutions, the most well-known being the palladium-catalyzed Tsuji-Trost reaction. The distinct mechanism of copper-catalyzed allylic substitutions has been known to provide high regioselectivity of the γ substituted product, compared to the α substituted isomer. The copper catalyst used can be symmetrical with two identical R groups, or with two different ligands. These reactions typically utilize “hard” carbon nucleophiles such as Grignard, diorganozinc, organolithium, and trialkyl aluminum reagents. This contrasts palladium-catalyzed allylic substitutions which involve “soft” nucleophiles..

== Mechanism ==
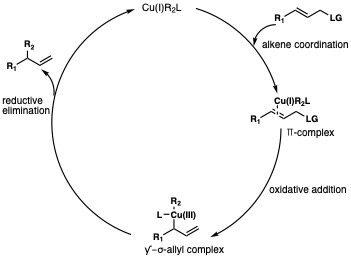
The proposed catalytic cycle

The catalytic cycle begins with coordination of the Cu(I) species to the olefin, followed by oxidative addition at the γ position and an allylic shift to displace the leaving group. This generates a Cu(III) allyl complex intermediate. Finally, reductive elimination yields the final product and regenerates Cu(I). A Cu(III) intermediate has not been confirmed by isolation from allylic substitutions, but Cu(III) intermediates have been isolated before, thus providing credence to the proposed mechanism. If reductive elimination does not occur fast enough, the γ allyl complex can isomerize to the α allyl complex and yield the α substituted isomer as a byproduct. This side pathway can be prevented by using electron withdrawing ligands on copper, typically a cyanide or halide ligand, which promote reductive elimination.

=== Asymmetric copper-catalyzed allylic substitution ===
Mechanistically, oxidative addition is the step that determines which enantiomer is formed. Chiral ligands on the metal center along with low temperatures are the general tactics employed to produce an enantiopure product. In particular, the careful pairing of ligand classes with the type of nucleophile has proven to be essential. With Grignard reagents, ferrocenyl thiolate, phosphorus, and NHC ligands are typically used. There have also been several methods developed using diorganozinc nucleophiles coupled with phosphorus, amine, peptide, and NHC ligands. The scope of organoaluminium nucleophiles is comparatively smaller, but there have been a couple examples using NHC ligands. There is a need for more studies to better understand the mechanism of stereoinduction to expand the known set of reactions to encompass a larger overall substrate scope and to potentially allow for enantioselectivity at room temperature.

== Applications in natural product synthesis ==
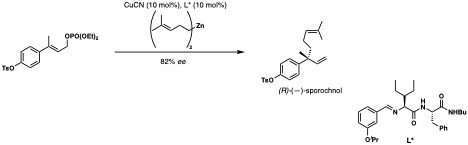
Copper-catalyzed allylic substitution used in Hoyveda's synthesis of (R)-(-)-sporochnol

There have been several enantioselective versions of this reaction developed, and even employed in synthesis of complex molecules. Hoyveda's synthesis of (R)-(-)-sporochnol included an asymmetric copper-catalyzed allylic substitution with an organozinc nucleophile and peptide ligand.

A TaniaPHOS ligand, a ferrocenylphosphine, is used with a methyl Grignard nucleophile to form an allylic stereocenter towards the total synthesis of (S)-(-)-Zearalenone

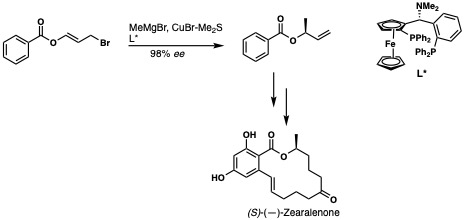
Copper-catalyzed allylic substitution in the total synthesis of (S)-(-)-Zearalenone.

Allylic substitutions are one class of the several types of reactions carried out by organocuprate reagents.
