= Leonard Shoen =

American entrepreneur (1916–1999)

- Born: Leonard Samuel Shoen; February 29, 1916; McGrath, Minnesota, U.S.
- Died: October 4, 1999 (aged 83); Las Vegas Valley, Nevada, U.S.
- Education: Oregon State University (BS); Northwestern College of Law (LLB)
- Occupation: Entrepreneur
- Spouse(s): Anna Carty (until her death); Suzanne Gilbaugh (divorced); Suzanne Whitmore (divorced); Carol Shoen (until his death)
- Children: 13 including Joe and Mark

Leonard Samuel Shoen (February 29, 1916 – October 4, 1999) was an American entrepreneur who founded the U-Haul truck and trailer organization in Ridgefield, Washington. After growing up in the farm belt during the Great Depression, he envisioned the market for rental vehicles for families who wished to avoid the expense of professional transfer and storage companies and move around the country.

== Early life, education and service ==
Shoen (pronounced "shown") was born on February 29, 1916, in McGrath, Minnesota, to Sophie (née Appert) and Samuel J. Shoen. His father moved the family to Oregon in 1923 to farm in the Willamette Valley near Shedd.

Shoen worked his way through Oregon State University by running a chain of beauty parlors and barber shops in Corvallis and nearby Albany, and later at Camp Adair north of Corvallis and at the Hanford Reservation in Washington. Sam earned a B.Sc. in General Science (a pre-med degree) from OSC in 1943, and entered the University of Oregon Medical School in Portland. Shoen was suspended from medical school during his fourth year after he "called out present during a roll-call for an absent classmate", and never returned.

Shoen served in the U.S. Navy as a Hospital Apprentice First Class in Bayview, Idaho, and Seattle, and was given a medical discharge in 1945 for rheumatic fever. After starting the U-Haul Company, Shoen earned an LL.B. at the Northwestern College of Law, later known as the Lewis & Clark Law School, in Portland in 1955.

== Career ==
Shoen began his career as a barber while attending Oregon State University in the years leading up to World War II.

=== U-Haul ===
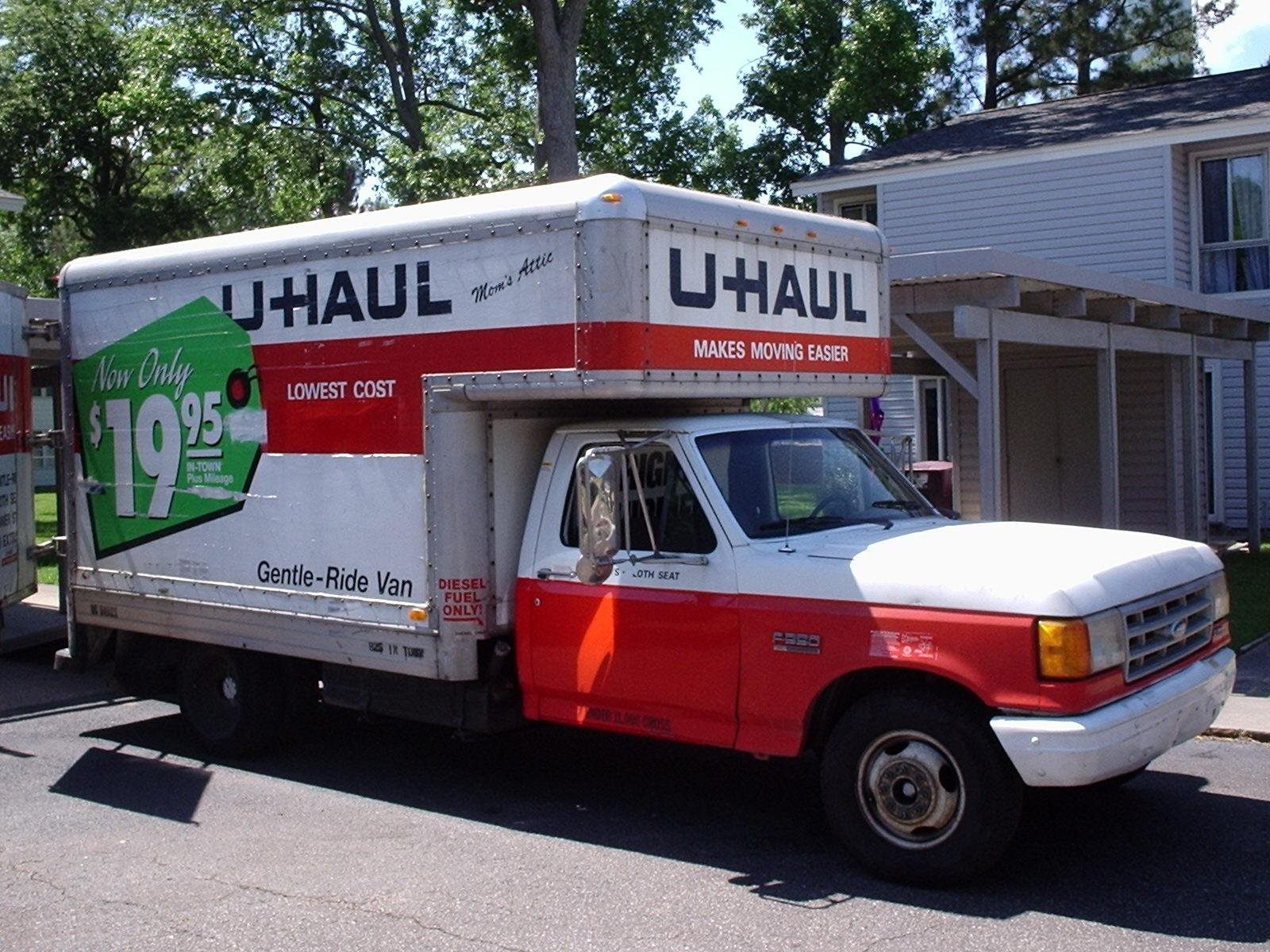
A U-Haul truck in 2006

In 1945, at the age of 29, Shoen co-founded U-Haul with his wife, Anna Mary Carty (1922–1957), in Ridgefield, Washington, north of Vancouver, Washington. Anna Mary was the mother of Shoen's first six children. The company was started with an investment of $5,000. In the early years, the Shoens routinely worked 16-hour days and reinvested all their earnings back into the business. He began building rental trailers at the Carty Ranch in Ridgefield, owned by his parents-in-law, and splitting the fees for their use with gas station owners whom he franchised as agents. The first U-Haul Rental Agent was a Mobil station on Interstate St. in Portland. These early deals were based on little more than a wink and a nod. He developed one-way rentals and enlisted investors as partners in each trailer as methods of growth. In 1951, Shoen reorganized the U-Haul Trailer Rental Company under a new holding company, ARCOA (Associated Rental Companies of America) Inc.

By 1955, there were more than 10,000 U-Haul trailers on the road and the brand was nationally known. The corporate offices were in Portland, until a 1967 relocation to Phoenix, Arizona. While distracted to some extent by growing his business, Shoen also managed multiple marriages after the death of his first wife from a congenital heart defect, and eventually had a total of 12 children, each of whom he made a stockholder. Shoen married Suzanne Gilbaugh in 1958, and they had five more children. Shoen divorced Gilbaugh, and married Suzanne Whitmore in 1978 to have one last child. Some observers say that Shoen saw it as his duty to confer upon his children the fruits of his labors, others say it was to avoid taxes. In either case, he had transferred all but 2% of control to his children when two of them, Joe and Mark, launched a successful takeover of the business in 1986.

In the 1960s, Shoen diversified his holdings by creating AMERCO Inc., from Advanced Management Engineering and Research Company. He pronounced the acronym, "a miracle". AMERCO remains the parent company of U-Haul and related businesses which support U-Haul operations, and is publicly traded.

== Personal life and death ==
Shoen resided in Las Vegas, Nevada. He died on October 4, 1999, at the age of 83, when he crashed his car into a telephone pole near his Las Vegas Valley, Nevada, home in what the Clark County Coroner's office ruled a suicide. Shoen was survived by his fourth wife, Carol, and all his children.

== See also ==
- Legend City, a Phoenix-area amusement park once owned by Shoen
