= Jack McKeon =

American baseball executive and manager (born 1930)

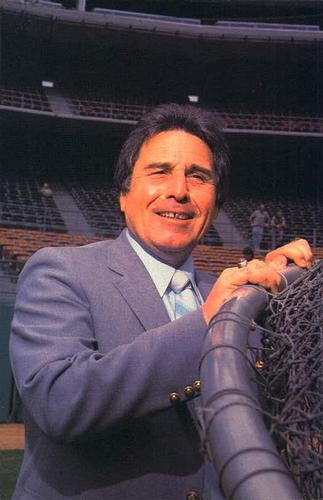
- McKeon in 1983
- Manager
- Born: November 23, 1930 (age 95); South Amboy, New Jersey, U.S.
- Batted: Right Threw: Right

MLB debut
- April 6, 1973, for the Kansas City Royals

Last MLB appearance
- September 28, 2011, for the Florida Marlins

MLB statistics
- Games managed: 2,042
- Managerial record: 1,051–990
- Winning %: .515
- Stats at Baseball Reference
- Managerial record at Baseball Reference

Teams
- Kansas City Royals (1973–1975); Oakland Athletics (1977, 1978); San Diego Padres (1988–1990); Cincinnati Reds (1997–2000); Florida Marlins (2003–2005, 2011)

Career highlights and awards
- World Series champion (2003); 2× NL Manager of the Year (1999, 2003); San Diego Padres Hall of Fame; Marlins Legends Hall of Fame

John Aloysius McKeon (/məˈkiːən/; born November 23, 1930), nicknamed "Trader Jack," is an American former manager and front-office executive in Major League Baseball (MLB).

In 2003, at age 72, he won a World Series as manager of the Florida Marlins. Two full seasons removed from his previous managing job, McKeon had begun the 2003 season in retirement, but on May 11, he was induced to return to uniform to replace Jeff Torborg as the Marlins' skipper. The team was 16–22 and in next-to-last place in the National League East Division. Described upon his hiring by Marlins' general manager Larry Beinfest as a "resurrection specialist," McKeon led the Marlins to a 75–49 win–loss record, a wild card berth, victories over the San Francisco Giants and Chicago Cubs in the National League divisional and championship series playoffs, and then a six-game World Series triumph over the New York Yankees; he was the oldest manager to appear and win a World Series for nearly two decades.

He remained at the helm of the Marlins through 2005, then retired at age 74. In 2011, he took over the Marlins on June 20 for a second time as interim manager following the resignation of Edwin Rodríguez and served out the season. In so doing he became, at 80, the second oldest manager in big league history, behind only Connie Mack. He retired again at the end of the season with a career managerial record of 1,051–990–1 (.515).

McKeon previously managed the Kansas City Royals (1973–1975), Oakland Athletics (parts of both 1977 and 1978), San Diego Padres (1988–1990), and Cincinnati Reds (1997–2000). From July 7, 1980, through September 22, 1990, he served as the general manager of the Padres, assembling the team which won the 1984 National League pennant, the first in franchise history.

== Early life and education ==
Born and raised in South Amboy, New Jersey, McKeon attended St. Mary's High School, later renamed as Cardinal McCarrick High School. He played baseball for the College of the Holy Cross, and also attended Seton Hall University and Elon College, earning a Bachelor of Science degree in physical education.

== Career ==
=== Minor league player and manager ===
McKeon was a 5 ft 8 in (1.73 m), 195 lb (88 kg) catcher who threw and batted right-handed. He spent his entire early professional career (1949–64) in the minor leagues. He became a playing manager in 1955 at age 24, and then worked in the farm system of the original, modern-era Washington Senators franchise, and its successor, the Minnesota Twins, handling Triple-A assignments for the Vancouver Mounties (1962), Dallas-Fort Worth Rangers (1963) and Atlanta Crackers (Opening Day through June 21, 1964). McKeon then scouted for the Twins starting in mid-1964 before joining the Royals in 1968, one year before their Major League debut, as skipper of their Class A High Point-Thomasville farm team, where he won the Carolina League playoff championship. He led their Triple-A affiliate, the Omaha Royals of the American Association, from its founding in 1969 through 1972, and won two league titles.

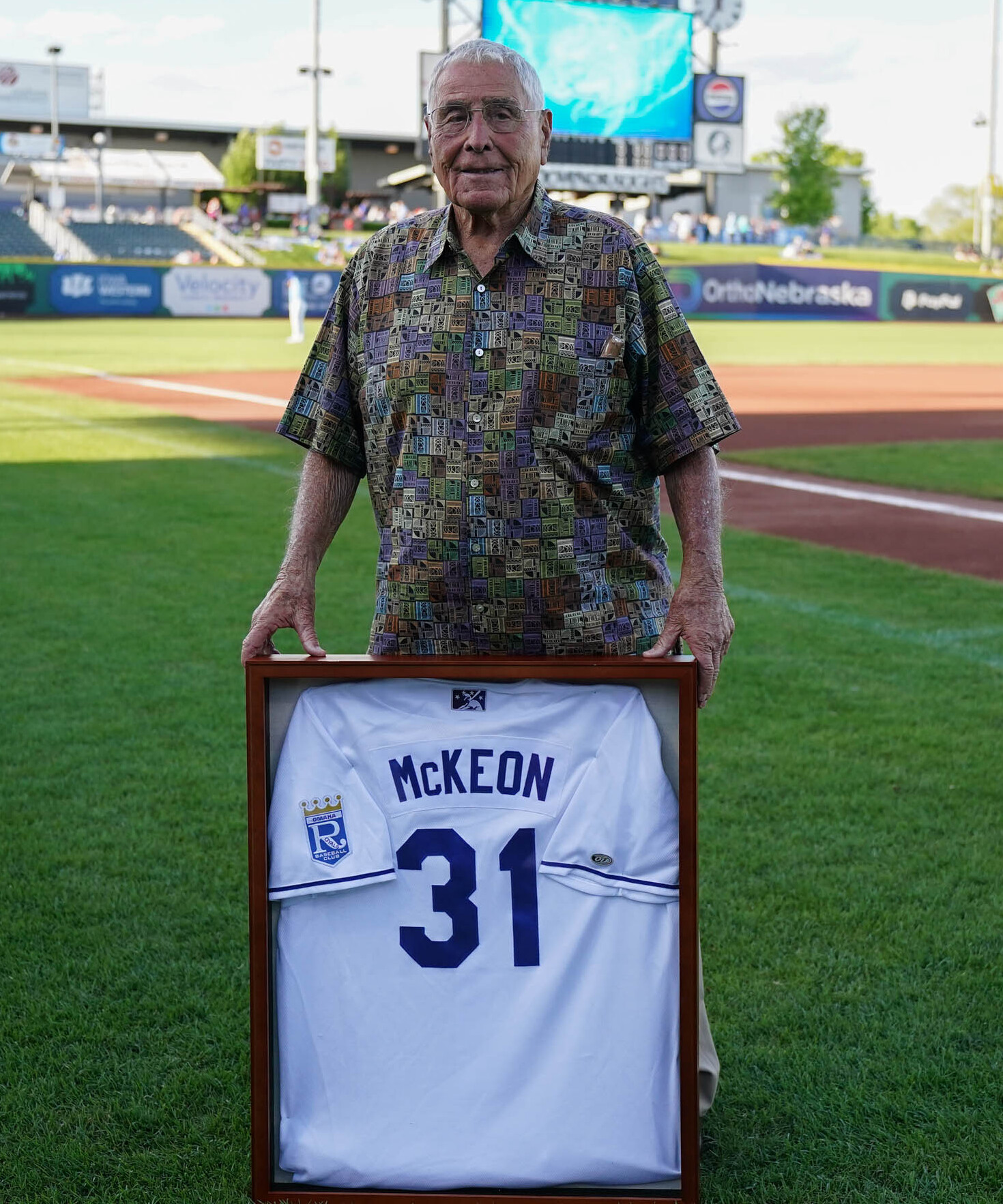
McKeon during a number retirement ceremony hosted by the Omaha Storm Chasers in May 2024

=== Manager of Royals and Athletics ===
McKeon, then 42, was promoted to manager of the Kansas City Royals for 1973, succeeding Bob Lemon. The 1972 Royals had gone a disappointing 76–78 during the strike-shortened season, and moved into brand-new Royals Stadium in 1973. Paced by the slugging of first baseman John Mayberry, an All-Star performance from centerfielder Amos Otis and the 20-win season of left-hander Paul Splittorff, McKeon's 1973 club finished with a record of 88 wins and 74 losses, for a .543 winning percentage; it was the best record yet compiled by the five-year-old franchise, six games behind the eventual world champion Oakland Athletics in the AL West and the fourth-best mark in the American League. The 1973 Royals also saw the mid-August call up of 20-year-old George Brett, the future Hall of Famer.

But the 1974 Royals could not sustain that momentum and finished 77–85 (.475), next-to-last in the AL West. McKeon's relationship with some of the players soured late in the campaign after his demand that hitting coach Charley Lau be relieved of his duties resulted in the latter's reassignment to the minor leagues in 1975. Two months after primary starting pitcher Steve Busby threatened to quit the team, McKeon was fired and replaced by California Angels third-base coach Whitey Herzog on July 24, 1975. At the time, the Royals were in second place, but trailed the defending and eventual division champion Athletics by 11 games. Herzog led Kansas City to three successive AL West titles (1976–78), and, in the 1980s, he would become one of McKeon's trading partners when both were general managers in the National League.

McKeon spent 1976 back in the minor leagues as skipper of the Richmond Braves of the International League. At season's end, he was named to succeed Chuck Tanner as manager of the 1977 Oakland Athletics during a time when meddlesome team owner Charlie Finley was trading away veteran talent in anticipation of free agency. Nevertheless, McKeon had led the stripped-down 1977 A's to a respectable 26–27 mark by June 8, only six games out of first place in the AL West, when Finley shocked baseball by replacing him with Bobby Winkles. McKeon remained in the Oakland organization, initially as an assistant to Finley for the rest of 1977 while the A's struggled under Winkles, going 37–71. Then, in 1978, McKeon returned to uniform as one of Winkles' coaches. History repeated itself when the undermanned A's roared off to a 19–5 start. They were still in first place at 24–15 on May 21 when Winkles resigned because of Finley's constant second-guessing and criticism of his job performance. McKeon then returned to the manager's post and finished the 1978 season, with Oakland winning only 45 of 123 games and falling into sixth place in the seven-team AL West.

Fired again by Finley, McKeon departed the Oakland organization to manage the Denver Bears, Triple-A affiliate of the Montreal Expos, in 1979.

=== General manager of Padres ===
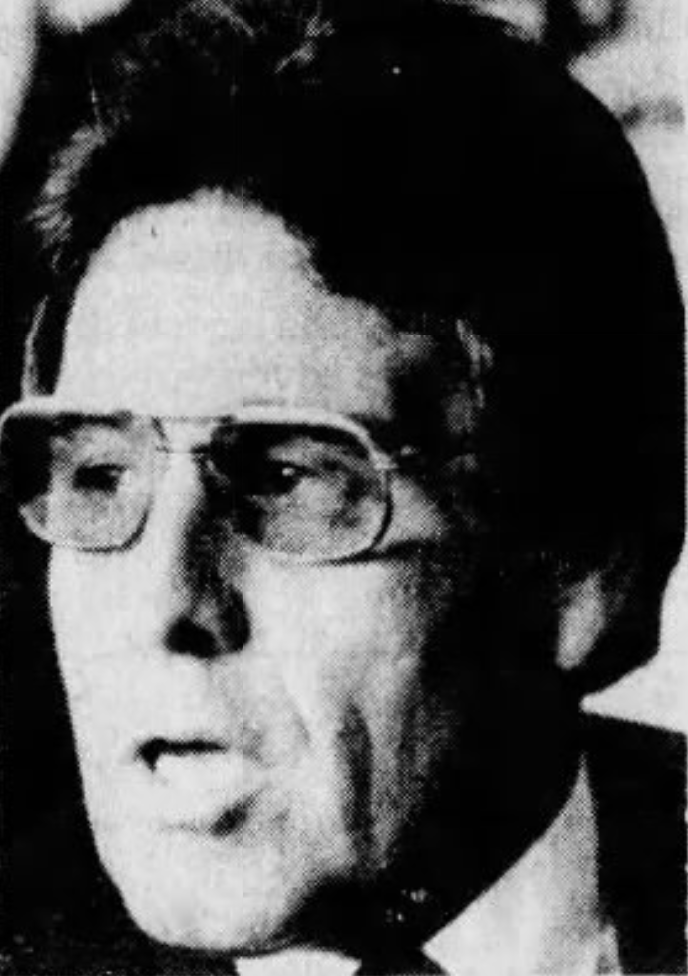
McKeon in 1982

McKeon then moved from the field into the front office. He began the 1980 season as the top assistant to Bob Fontaine, the general manager of the San Diego Padres. During the 1980 All-Star break, with the Padres in last place in the National League West Division, owner Ray Kroc and club president Ballard Smith fired Fontaine and replaced him with McKeon, making him a first-time general manager at the age of 49. During his first off-season, he set about rebuilding the Padres through a flurry of trades—earning his "Trader Jack" nickname.

He began by acquiring young catcher Terry Kennedy from Herzog's St. Louis Cardinals in an 11-player deal. Over the next four off seasons, he would also trade for Dave Dravecky, Garry Templeton, Carmelo Martínez, and Graig Nettles, draft young stars Tony Gwynn and Kevin McReynolds, and sign free agents Steve Garvey and Goose Gossage, the core of San Diego's 1984 National League champions. In June 1989, he traded his own son-in-law, pitcher Greg Booker.

He told the New York Times in 1988: "Why do I trade? I'm aggressive. I'm confident. I'm a gambler. I'm willing to make a trade and not be afraid I'll get nailed."

=== Manager of Padres and Reds ===
McKeon stayed in the front office through the terms of four different managers. When the fourth skipper, Larry Bowa, started 1988 at 16–30, McKeon took over the managerial reins himself on May 28. He led the Padres to a 67–48 mark for the rest of 1988, and an 89–73 record in 1989. But when his 1990 Padres stalled at 37–43 at the All-Star break, McKeon turned the team over to coach Greg Riddoch. Slightly more than two months later, he was ousted from the general manager's job when the Padres' new owner, Tom Werner, hired Joe McIlvaine away from the New York Mets.

McKeon was out of baseball in 1991–92 before joining the Cincinnati Reds in 1993 as a Major League scout and then senior adviser for player personnel, working under GM Jim Bowden. He was in his fourth season in the latter job on July 25, 1997, when at age 66 he was asked to return to the field as the replacement for Ray Knight as the club's manager. The Reds were 43–56 and nine games out in the National League Central Division, but McKeon coaxed them to a 33–30 mark for the rest of the season. He then survived a poor 1998 campaign, with Cincinnati again posting a sub-.500 (77–85) record and finishing 25 games out of first place in its division (though the Reds had lost talent from previous years and were actually considered to have overachieved). McKeon turned the Reds around in 1999, leading them to 96 wins and a tie for the National League wild card through the full 162-game season. However, the Reds were defeated 5–0 by the Mets in a one-game playoff held in their home ballpark, Cinergy Field, and were eliminated from the postseason. Nevertheless, McKeon was named 1999 NL Manager of the Year for his achievement.

On the eve of 2000 spring training, the Reds electrified their fans by acquiring superstar center fielder Ken Griffey Jr. — a Cincinnati native and son of the Reds' coach and former star — in a trade with the Seattle Mariners. Griffey hit 40 home runs, but the Reds posted a disappointing 85–77 record and finished ten games behind the Cardinals. After the season ended, McKeon was relieved of his managerial duties. He was the last Reds manager to post a winning season until Dusty Baker in 2010.

=== Called to manage the Marlins ===
McKeon was again named National League Manager of the Year in 2003 — the result of leading the Marlins, who were six games below .500 when he took over on May 11, to a 75–49 record the rest of the way — and shared the 2003 Sporting News Sportsman of the Year award with Dick Vermeil. The Marlins proceeded to win the National League pennant, and were then victorious in the World Series, defeating the New York Yankees in six games. At age 72, McKeon became the oldest manager to win the World Series. The victory came against the team for which he rooted in his youth, having lived in South Amboy, New Jersey and attending Yankee games while a child. Perhaps not surprisingly, McKeon called Game 6 his greatest thrill of his career.

McKeon would lead the Marlins to the exact same record and division finish in 83-79 that was good for 3rd in the NL East in 2004 and 2005, although McKeon was the first manager to have led the Marlins to consecutive winning seasons. On September 3 of the 2005 season, McKeon won his 1,000th game as a manager, defeating the New York Mets at Dolphins Stadium 5–4. On October 2, just after the Marlins won the last game of the 2005 season, McKeon announced that he would not be returning the following season. McKeon led the Marlins to three of the six winning seasons in franchise history, but the Marlins were undertaking a rebuilding process, exchanging for veterans for unproven youngsters, and there was a consensus within the organization that a managerial change was in order.

On June 20, 2011, after manager Edwin Rodríguez resigned, the Florida Marlins held a press conference to announce that McKeon had been named interim manager. "I don't need this job but I love it," McKeon said. The Marlins were on a ten-game losing streak at the time McKeon took over, and the team had won exactly one game in the month of June (with McKeon, he would lead them to exactly four more wins in that month). He retired after the conclusion of the 2011 season. Over the course of the remaining 90 games, McKeon won forty to lead the team to a 72-90 finish and last in the NL East.

McKeon retired with a record of 1,051–990–1. He is one of twelve managers to have a thousand wins as manager without having lost a thousand as well. He is also the only manager to have won at least 1,000 games in the major and minor leagues, having won 1,146 in the minors.

== Personal life ==
McKeon currently lives in Elon, North Carolina. Prior to his latest managerial stint, he was serving as a special assistant to Florida Marlins owner Jeffrey Loria.

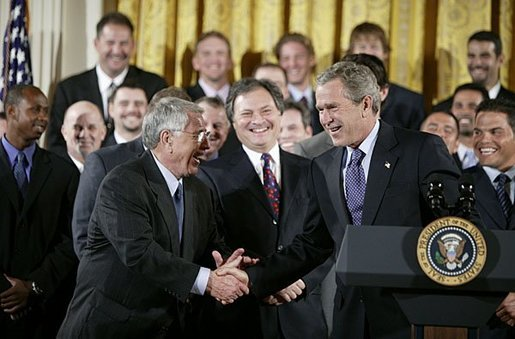
McKeon (left) shaking hands with President George W. Bush (right) on January 24, 2004

McKeon is a devout Catholic and attends daily Mass, even doing so while his team was traveling during his managerial career. He attributes much of his success, especially the Marlins' win in the 2003 National League Championship Series, to the intercession of Saint Thérèse of Lisieux.

In 1950, McKeon enlisted in the United States Air Force and played for the baseball team at Sampson Air Force Base in New York.

McKeon is the author of two books, Jack of All Trades and I'm Just Getting Started.

McKeon's son, Kasey, was a minor league catcher from 1989 to 1991 before becoming a scout; as of 2018, he is the director of player procurement of the Washington Nationals. Jack McKeon's grandson, Kellan, is a two-time state champion wrestler for Chapel Hill High School and was the captain of the wrestling team at Duke University. McKeon has another grandson, Avery Booker, who is the head baseball coach for Greensboro College in Greensboro, NC

On May 5, 2012, McKeon was inducted into the Fulton County (NY) Baseball & Sports Hall of Fame for his achievements with the Gloversville-Johnstown Glovers, in which he played for in 1950 and 1951 in Gloversville, New York. On Tuesday, May 26, 2015, McKeon was inducted into the Irish American Baseball Hall of Fame, along with former Royals slugger Mike Sweeney, broadcaster Dave O'Brien, New York Mets public relations executive Shannon Forde, and Bill Murray, the comedic actor and owner of several minor league baseball teams. In 2017, McKeon was elected into the Padres Hall of Fame.

== Managerial record ==
Team	Year	Regular season					Postseason			
Team	Year	Games	Won	Lost	Win %	Finish	Won	Lost	Win %	Result
KC	1973	162	88	74	.543	2nd in AL West	–	–	–	–
KC	1974	162	77	85	.475	5th in AL West	–	–	–	–
KC	1975	96	50	46	.521	fired	–	–	–	–
KC total		420	201	219	.479		-	-	-	
OAK	1977	53	26	27	.521	fired	–	–	–	–
OAK	1978	123	45	78	.366	6th in AL West	–	–	–	–
OAK total		176	71	105	.403		-	-	-	
SD	1988	115	67	48	.583	3rd in NL West	–	–	–	–
SD	1989	162	89	73	.549	2nd in NL West	–	–	–	–
SD	1990	80	37	43	.463	fired	–	–	–	–
SD total		357	193	164	.541		-	-	-	
CIN	1997	63	33	30	.524	3rd in NL Central	–	–	–	–
CIN	1998	162	77	85	.475	4th in NL Central	–	–	–	–
CIN	1999	163	96	67	.589	2nd in NL Central	–	–	–	–
CIN	2000	163	85	77	.525	2nd in NL Central	–	–	–	–
CIN total		551	291	259	.529		-	-	-	
FLA	2003	124	75	49	.605	2nd in NL East	11	6	.647	Won World Series (NYY)
FLA	2004	162	83	79	.512	3rd in NL East	-	-	-	-
FLA	2005	162	83	79	.512	3rd in NL East	-	-	-	-
FLA	2011	90	40	50	.444	5th in NL East	-	-	-	-
FLA total		538	281	257	.522		11	6	.647	
Total		2,042 (Note: McKeon also managed a game that ended in a tie on April 3, 2000)	1,051	990	.515		11	6	.647	

== See also ==
- List of College of the Holy Cross alumni
- List of Major League Baseball All-Star Game managers
- List of Major League Baseball managers with most career wins

== Notes ==
Sporting positions
Preceded by Billy Hitchcock	Vancouver Mounties manager 1962	Succeeded by Franchise transferred
Preceded by Ray Murray	Dallas-Fort Worth Rangers manager 1963	Succeeded by John McNamara
Preceded by Harry Walker	Atlanta Crackers manager 1964	Succeeded by Pete Appleton
Preceded by Franchise established	Omaha Royals manager 1969–1972	Succeeded by Harry Malmberg
Preceded by Bob Lemon	Richmond Braves manager 1976	Succeeded by Tommie Aaron
Preceded by Doc Edwards	Denver Bears manager 1979	Succeeded by Billy Gardner
