= André K. Isaacs =

Jamaican chemist known for science outreach

- Born: December 20, 1981 (age 44); Kingston, Jamaica
- Education: College of the Holy Cross (BS); University of Pennsylvania (PhD)
- Scientific career
- Fields: Organic chemistry
- Institutions: College of the Holy Cross
- Doctoral advisor: Jeffrey D. Winkler
- Website: https://www.isaacslab.com/

André K. Isaacs (born December 20, 1981) is a Jamaican organic chemist and professor of chemistry at the College of the Holy Cross. He is also a queer science communicator mainly using TikTok and Twitter, where he posts dancing and choreography videos to teach chemistry lessons. Many of his videos have gone viral on these platforms.

== Early life and education ==
Isaacs was born in Kingston, Jamaica, on December 20, 1981. His uncle was a chemistry and mathematics teacher; he has cited his uncle as his inspiration for pursuing science education.

In 2005, after finishing schooling in Jamaica, he moved to the United States to pursue a bachelor's degree in chemistry at the College of the Holy Cross. His professors and research advisors encouraged him during his undergraduate education to continue graduate studies due to his skills in organic chemistry. He obtained a PhD in chemistry in 2011 at the University of Pennsylvania under the direction of Jeffrey Winkler. Later, he went to the University of California, Berkeley as a postdoctoral fellow before moving back to College of the Holy Cross as an associate professor.

Isaacs identifies himself as a queer Black immigrant in science and has used his experience to motivate his advocacy. After having come out to his unsupportive family, he found comfort within a supportive lab environment. He has spoken openly about the challenges of being queer, Black, and alienated, which nearly caused him to drop out of graduate school. Consequently, he has focused on community building when building his lessons and online presence.

== Research ==
Isaacs works on copper-catalyzed reactions using click chemistry, particularly, the copper-catalyzed cycloaddition of sulfonyl azides and terminal alkynes (CuAAC) and differential fragmentation of the resulting 1,2,3-triazole generates ketenimines and rhodium carbenoids which readily engage with a variety of nucleophiles to gain access to heterocycles of interest to the synthetic community.

As of 2024, his lab is staffed only by undergraduate student researchers. His research group has demonstrated the utility of click chemistry in the synthesis of N-Heterocycles such as indolizines, dihydroisoquinolines and as an approach to beta-lactams.

He has also researched antibiotic resistance and novel antibiotic drug development.

== Science outreach ==
Isaacs has had viral success in science outreach due to his accessible and approachable videos where he aims to demonstrate that science can be conducted by anyone. During an interview on Today he stated:

It doesn't matter what you look like. It doesn't matter how you identify. I want students to realize that whatever they bring is an asset and that science is better when people bring their unique qualities and skills to the table.

His videos include dances from popular movie franchises such as Black Panther or Harry Potter, pop culture moments such as Rihanna's performance during the Super Bowl LVII halftime show, among other trending audios. In many of his videos, he wears a signature rainbow lab coat to promote diversity and inclusivity within chemistry. He has even made the analogy that chemistry is queer due to molecules bonding with a wide variety of partners.

In addition, his work covers topics on queer culture and social justice. Some of his chemistry videos explain addictive substances such as poppers or his thoughts and opinions around the Black Lives Matter movement. His scientific outreach videos also help explain chemistry, including the 2022 Nobel Prize in Chemistry involving click and bioorthagonal chemistry. He has mentioned the importance of this award for him since it is the foundation of his scientific research. Additionally, Carolyn Bertozzi, one of the laureates, is the eighth woman to receive the Nobel Prize in Chemistry and the first (known) to belong to the LGBTQ+ community.

In 2012 he founded Outfront, an alliance for LGBTQ+ students and staff at the College of the Holy Cross. The organization promotes and supports members of the LGBTQ+ community by increasing their visibility on campus.

He has given lectures and published scientific articles presenting his lines of research as well as his methods of teaching chemistry. As a result, he has been invited to speak at universities such as King's College London, the University of Minnesota, and Stanford University.
