= Roberto Quarta =

Italian-American business executive

- Born: May 10, 1949 (age 77); Italy
- Education: College of the Holy Cross (BA)
- Occupation: Businessman
- Title: Chairman of Smith & Nephew and WPP plc
- Term: February 2015 until July 2024
- Successor: Philip Jansen
- Board member of: Smith & Nephew; WPP plc Rexel SA; Italtel
- Children: 2

Roberto Quarta (born May 10, 1949) is an Italian-born American businessman. He is the chairman of Smith & Nephew, and the chairman of WPP plc since June 2015.

== Early life and education ==
Roberto Quarta was born on May 10, 1949, in Italy. He emigrated to the United States at the age of 15, and he spent the rest of his adolescence in Brooklyn, New York City, where his father was a tailor. Quarta graduated from the College of the Holy Cross.

== Career ==
His initial industrial management career was with BTR plc, where he rose to be a board director.

In 1993 he moved to become chief executive of BBA Group, where he executed strong performance improvement and portfolio change, producing a major increase in shareholder value. He later became chair of BBA (which was renamed BBA Aviation following the demerger of Fiberweb in November 2006), stepping down in 2007.

Quarta is a partner of Clayton, Dubilier & Rice, a private equity group. He is on the board of two CD&R businesses, Rexel SA and Italtel. He was chairman of IMI plc (2011-2015). He has been on the boards of PowerGen plc, BAE Systems plc, and Equant NV. He has been the chairman of Smith & Nephew since 2014.

In June 2015, he was appointed chairman of WPP plc, succeeding Philip Lader.

Following the resignation of Martin Sorrell, CEO and founder of WPP, he became executive chairman in April 2018.

== Personal life ==
Quarta is separated from his first wife, with whom he has a son and a daughter. He remarried
