= Mark Shoen =

American businessman

- Born: 1951 (age 74–75); Phoenix, Arizona, U.S.
- Education: College of the Holy Cross (BA)
- Occupation: Businessman
- Title: Vice president of U-Haul
- Children: 1
- Parent(s): Leonard Shoen (father); Anna Carty
- Relatives: Joe Shoen (brother)

Mark V. Shoen (born 1951) is an American billionaire business executive. He is the vice president of the storage rental company U-Haul and the largest shareholder in its parent company Amerco. As of 2023, Shoen is the richest person in Arizona, with an estimated net worth of $4.8 billion.

== Early life and education ==
Shoen was born in Phoenix, Arizona, the fourth of six children of Leonard S. Shoen and Anna Mary Carty Shoen. His brother Joe is also a leader of U-Haul. His parents co-founded U-Haul in 1945. Beginning in 1952, his parents established trusts and investments in the names of their children, including gifts of stock. His mother, who had helped operate the growing family business, died of a heart attack in 1957 at age 34, leaving Leonard with the six children.

A year after Anna Mary's death, Leonard married Suzanne Gilbaugh, and Mark and Joe were the two oldest children still living at home after Samuel and Michael had been sent to boarding school. In 1967, the Shoen household moved to the Tatum House in Paradise Valley, Arizona.

After high school, Shoen graduated from the College of the Holy Cross in Worcester, Massachusetts, with a Bachelor of Arts in sociology with honors in 1973. As an undergraduate at Holy Cross, Shoen served as the president of its Alpha Kappa Delta honor society chapter.

== Career ==
By the mid-1970s, Shoen and his brothers Samuel, Michael and Joe had moved into top management at U-Haul. In 1979, Shoen and Joe resigned from the company amid a dispute over its direction, with Mark also expressing dissatisfaction that the siblings had not received dividends on their holdings in U-Haul parent company AMERCO.

During the mid-1980s, their father, Leonard Shoen, and brother Samuel pursued a diversification strategy that expanded the company beyond its core moving business into general rentals, while Mark and Joe favored concentrating on self-moving. In 1986, Mark and Joe challenged their father's control of the company, and Leonard Shoen was forced into early retirement. After gaining control, Mark and Joe diversified business, reduced the workforce, and invested $1.2 billion in upgrading the company's fleet of trucks and trailers. By September 1990, Shoen was the president of U-Haul.

The change in control produced prolonged litigation within the Shoen family, and in 1996 a federal bankruptcy judge approved a plan for AMERCO to pay the remaining $313.8 million on a judgment awarded to Leonard Shoen and six of his children.

Shoen served on AMERCO's board of directors from 1990 until February 1997 and on U-Haul's board from 1990 until November 1997. He was president of U-Haul's Phoenix Operations from 1994 through 2007. He was vice president of U-Haul Business Consultants, an AMERCO subsidiary, in 2008. Shoen retired from AMERCO in June 2012.

Following his retirement from AMERCO, Shoen continued to serve as a manager of Foster Road LLC and as president and sole director of Blackwater Investments, Inc. He also controlled the general partner of Mercury Partners, L.P., whose self-storage properties were managed by U-Haul Holding Company. U-Haul Holding Company's 2026 proxy statement classified the company as a "controlled company" under New York Stock Exchange standards because Mark Shoen, Joe Shoen and companies under their control together possessed more than 50 percent of its voting power.

According to Forbes, Shoen has a net worth of $4.8 billion, as of August 2023.

== Personal life ==
Shoen is married with one child, and lives in Phoenix, Arizona.
