= Chester L. Sutula =

American scientist

Chester Louis Sutula is an American scientist from Erie, Pennsylvania, US.

== Education and experience ==
Chester (Chet) Sutula obtained his Bachelor of Science degree in chemistry from the College of the Holy Cross in Worcester, Massachusetts in 1954 and his Ph.D. degree in physical chemistry from Iowa State University, Ames, Iowa in 1959. He worked for eight years for Marathon Oil Company, in Littleton, Colorado, performing research on the influence of capillarity and surface chemical forces in secondary oil production, and, the structural properties of microemulsions using small angle x-ray scattering.

In 1967, he joined Ames Company, a division of Miles Laboratories, Inc. in Elkhart, Indiana, and became its research director in 1970. His team at Ames performed fundamental and applied research on the properties of solid, porous analytical devices, such as, Lateral flow device (strip test) for urinalysis, blood chemistry, microbiology and quantitative, simple measurement of blood glucose for daily use by diabetics. In 1976, he joined Ortho Diagnostics Systems, a division of Johnson & Johnson, Inc., as vice president of R&D and worked on new systems for blood typing, high volume immunoassays, and tests to detect hepatitis, pregnancy and blood coagulation disorders. In 1981, with his wife, Jane, and a technology partner in Europe, Sutula founded Agdia, Inc., Elkhart, Indiana, to develop and provide reliable and practical diagnostics for the detection of plant pathogens.

Sutula has served on American Phytopathological Society (APS) committees for Industry, for Virology, and for Diagnostics and has been a reviewer for Plant Disease. He has authored several articles and many posters and presentations dealing with the detection of plant pathogens.

== Realization/ Works ==
1/ In the 80's, diagnostic assays based on the Enzyme Linked Immunosorbent Assay (ELISA) method were already being developed for human and veterinary applications. Following the reports of the first use of ELISA to detect plant viruses by Voller and Clarke (1976), Sutula introduced in 1981 the first commercial kits for the detection of common viruses and bacteria in potato. These kits provided all of the components that were necessary to perform the test in a ready-to-use format, called PathoScreen®. He established collaborations with many plant pathologists all over the world to produce tests that are recognized worldwide for their quality and value.

2/ With two competing companies in Europe, Inotech, Basil, Switzerland and Boehringer Mannheim, Germany, Sutula pioneered the concept of "reagent sets"—matched, quality-controlled antibodies and antibody-enzyme conjugates that can be used to prepare and perform one's own test. He integrated these ideas into plant diagnostics, expanded the scope of diagnostic assays, and guided Agdia to a continuous company growth over the past 35 years.

3/ In response to many requests, he formed Agdia Testing Services in 1982, a unit of Agdia. Agdia currently offers more than 200 tests that use several technologies, such as ELISA, Recombinase Polymerase Amplification (RPA), Polymerase Chain Reaction (PCR), nucleic acid hybridization, immunochromatography, and Immunofluorescence assay (IFA), to detect viruses, viroids, bacteria, fungi, mycoplasma, insects, plant hormones, and proteins in conventional and genetically modified crops (GMO). He developed international sales and helped to establish Agdia-Biofords, French company based in Genopole Évry, in charge of product distribution in Europe, Africa and Middle East.

Sutula's vision was to make research on detecting plant pathogens available to many persons in worldwide agriculture and to package this technology into easy-to-perform, affordable tests. Now in retirement, Chet continues his special interest in simplifying complex chemistry and procedures into tests that are reliable and simple to perform.

== Publications ==
=== Thesis and dissertation ===
Sutula, Chester Louis, Structure, molecular orientation and mechanically induced reorientation of molecules in multimolecular films of long-chain n-hydrocarbon derivatives, 155 (1959)

=== Journal articles ===
1. van Kretschmar, J. B., Bailey W. D., Arellano, C., Thompson, G. D., Sutula, C. L., Roe, R. M., Feeding disruption tests for monitoring the frequency of larval lepidopteran resistance to Cry1Ac, Cry1F, and Cry1Ab, Crop Prot. 30(7), 863-870 (2011)

2. Roe, R. M., W. D. Bailey, W. D., Gould, F., Sorenson, C. E., Kennedy, G. G., Bacheler, J. S., Rose, R. Hodgson, L. E., Sutula, C. L., Detection of resistant insects and IPM, Emerging technologies for integrated pest management concepts, research and implementation. Proceedings of a Conference, Raleigh, North Carolina, US, 8–10 March 1999. 2000 pp. 67–84. [Book ISBN 0-89054-246-5]

3. Zeng, F., Ramaswamy, S. B., Luttrell, R. G., Reed, J., Parker, C. D., Stewart, S., Harris, A., Knighten, K., Robbins, J., Xia, J. Q., Sutula, C. L., Comparison of monoclonal antibody and laboratory rearing techniques to identify Heliothentinaen (Lepidoptera: Noctuidae) eggs from Mississippi cotton fields, Environmental Entomology 28 (2): 275-281 (1999)

4. Yuen, G. Y., Xia, J. Q., Sutula, C. L., A Sensitive ELISA for Pythium ultimum Using Polyclonal and Species-Specific Monoclonal Antibodies, Plant Dis. 82(9), 1029-1032 (1998)

5. Xia, J. Q., Sutula, C. L., Marti, D., Development of a greenhouse test for tomato spotted wilt virus and impatiens necrotic spot virus, Acta Horticulturae 431:193-198 (1995)

6. Sutula, C. L., Gillett, J. M., Morrissey, S. M., Ramsdell, D. C., Interpreting ELISA data and establishing the positive-negative threshold, Plant Dis. 70(8s), 722 (1986)

7. Wershaw, R. L., Burcar, J. P., Sutula, C. L., Wiginton, B. L., Sodium humate solution studied with small-angle x-ray scattering, Science 157(3795), 1429-31 (1967)

8. Sutula, C. L., Wilson, J. E., Solid-like films at a moving interface, Society of Petroleum Engineers Journal 7(1), (1967)

9. Bartell, L. S., Sutula, C. L., Mechanically induced molecular reorientation in multimolecular films, The Journal of Physical Chemistry 67(11), 2413-2416 (1963)

10. Sutula, C. L., Bartell, L. S., Structure and molecular orientation in multimolecular films of long-chain n-hydrocarbon derivatives, The Journal of Physical Chemistry 66(6), 1010-1014 (1962)

=== Patents ===
1. Bandla, M, D., Chambers, M, R., Sutula, C. L., Immunoassay and method of use, U.S. Patent Number: 7,585,641

2. Roe, R. M., Bailey, W. D., Gould, F., Kennedy, G. G., Sutula, C. L., Insecticide Resistance Assay. U.S. Patent Number: 6,517,856. (2003)

3. Geister, R. L., Bandla, M. D., Sutula, C. L., Multiplex enzyme-linked immunosorbent assay for detecting multiple analytes, U.S. Patent Appl. Number: 20040231776

4. Stiso, S. N., Sutula, C. L., Method, composition and device for determining the specific gravity or osmolality of a liquid, U.S. Patent Number: 4,108,727

5. Sena, E. A., Tolbert, B. M., Sutula, C. L., Liquid scintillation, counting and compositions, U.S. Patent Number: 3,928,227

6. Sutula, C. L., Wilson, J. E., Cleaning porous solids, U.S. Patent Number: 3,325,309
