= U-Haul =

American moving and self-storage rental company

U-Haul Holding Company
- Type: Public
- Traded as: NYSE: UHAL; Russell 1000 component
- Industry: Rentals
- Founded: 1945; 81 years ago in Ridgefield, Washington, US
- Founders: Leonard Shoen; Anna Mary Carty
- Headquarters: Phoenix, Arizona, US
- Key people: Joe Shoen (chairman, CEO); John Taylor (president); Sebastien Reyes (vice president)
- Products: Truck rentals, trailer rentals, boxes, moving supplies, tow hitches, self-storage
- Revenue: ▲US$6.04 billion (2026)
- Net income: ▼US$83.1 million (2026)
- Number of employees: 19,500 (2020)
- Website: uhaul.com

U-Haul Holding Company is an American moving truck, trailer, and self-storage rental company based in Phoenix, Arizona, that has been in operation since 1945. The company was founded by Leonard Shoen and Anna Mary Carty in Ridgefield, Washington, who began it in a garage owned by Carty's family, and expanded it through franchising with gas stations. U-Haul operates in all 50 states of the U.S. and the 10 Canadian provinces.

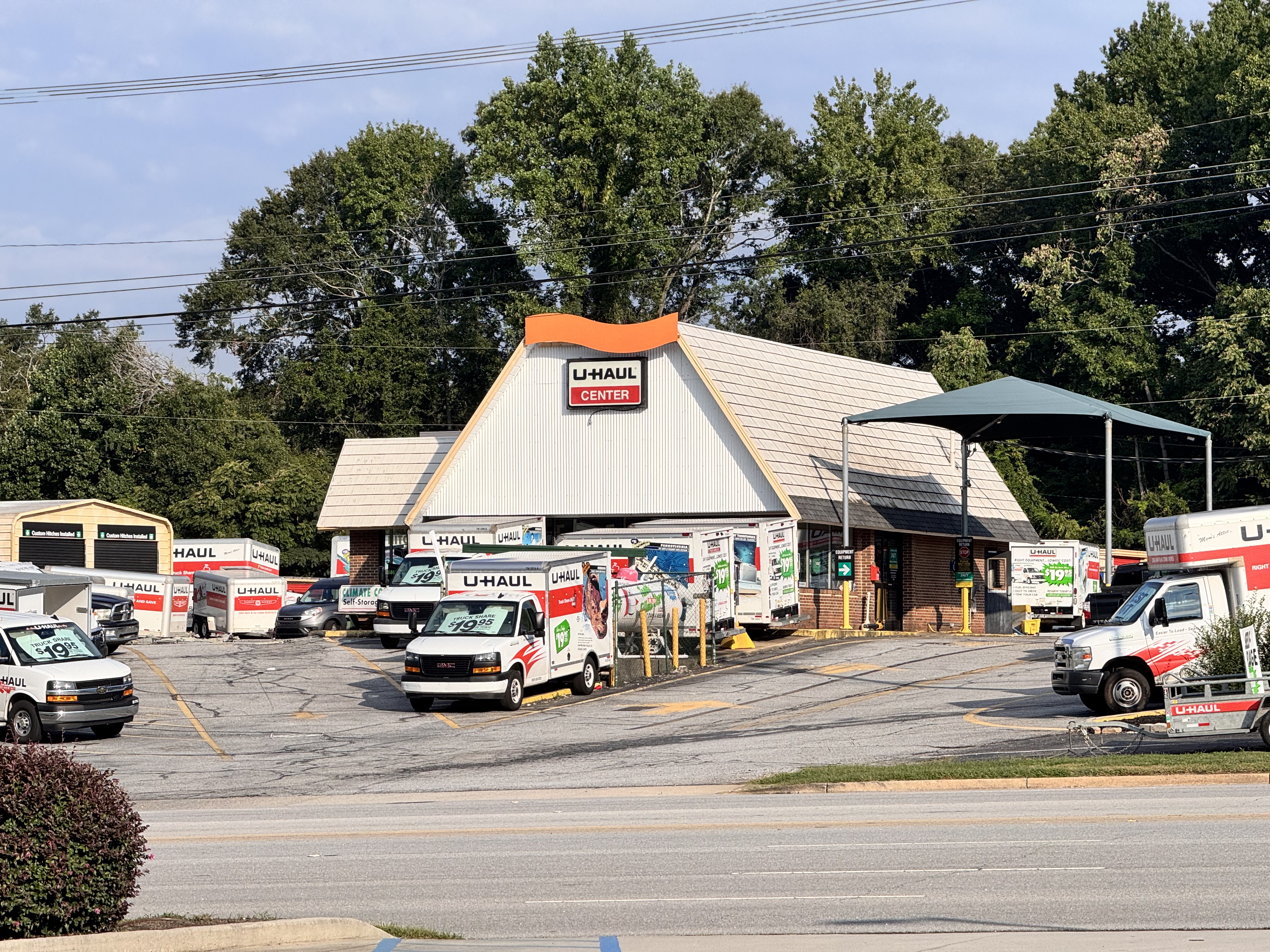
Trucks outside a U-Haul Center in Greenville, South Carolina

== Overview ==
The U-Haul Holding Company, previously known as AMERCO, is a publicly traded holding company that also operates:

- Amerco Real Estate (which purchases existing buildings for conversion to self-storage facilities, existing self-storage facilities and bare land),
- RepWest Insurance Company (which provides optional insurance for customers renting U-Haul vehicles and self-storage space), and
- Oxford Life Insurance Company (which provides annuities, life insurance, and Medicare supplement insurance for senior adults).

The Shoen family (heirs of founder Sam Shoen) currently owns, both directly and indirectly, about 55 percent of AMERCO.

U-Haul rents trucks, trailers, and other pieces of equipment, but many U-Haul centers also provide self storage units, moving boxes and associated packing supplies, moving assistance, LPG (propane) refueling, and hitch and trailer wiring installation, among other services.

Because of the company's ubiquity (there are over 17,000 active dealers across the country) the name is sometimes used as a genericized trademark to refer to the services of any self-move rental company.

== History ==
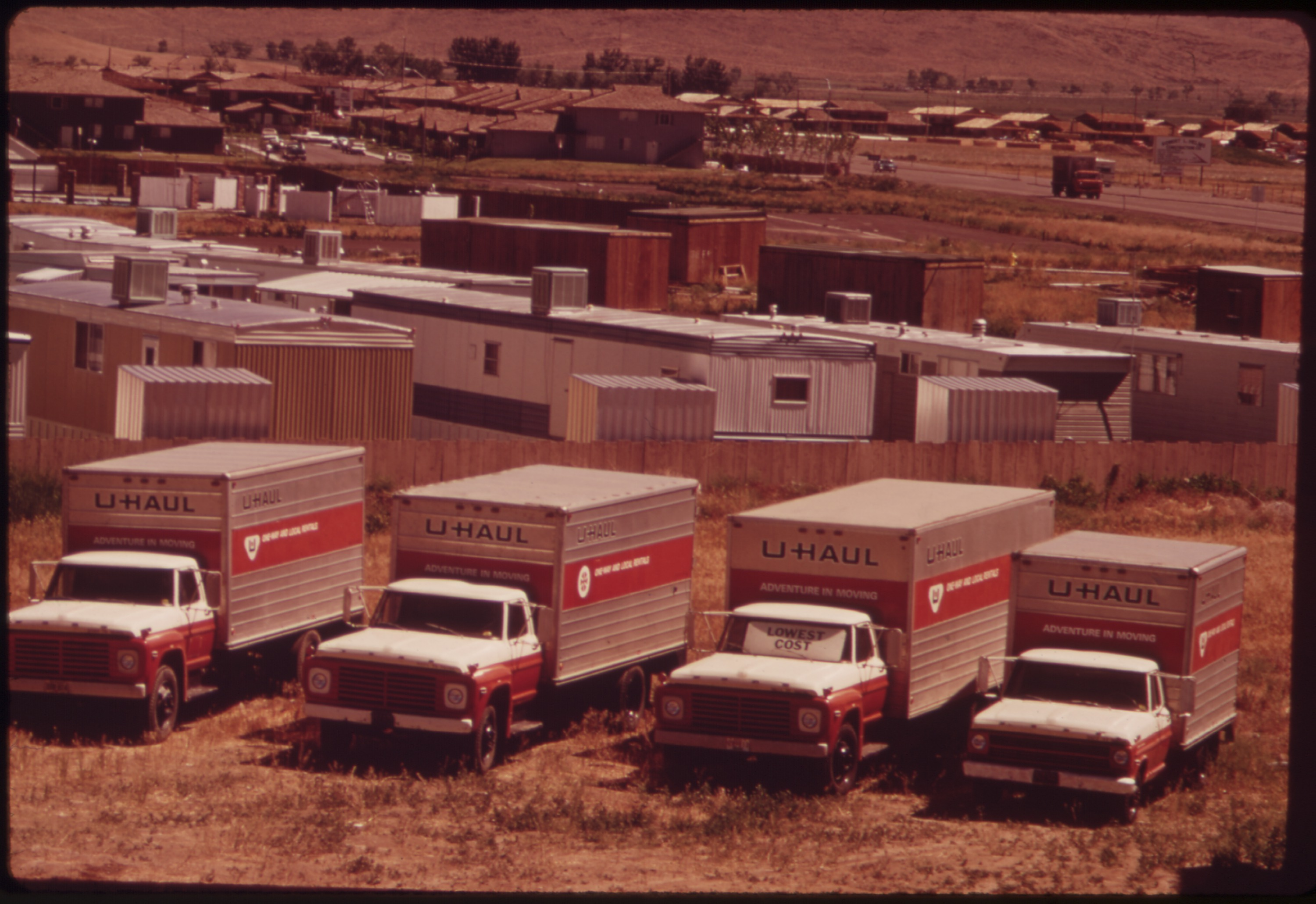
U-Haul trucks outside Reno, Nevada, in 1973

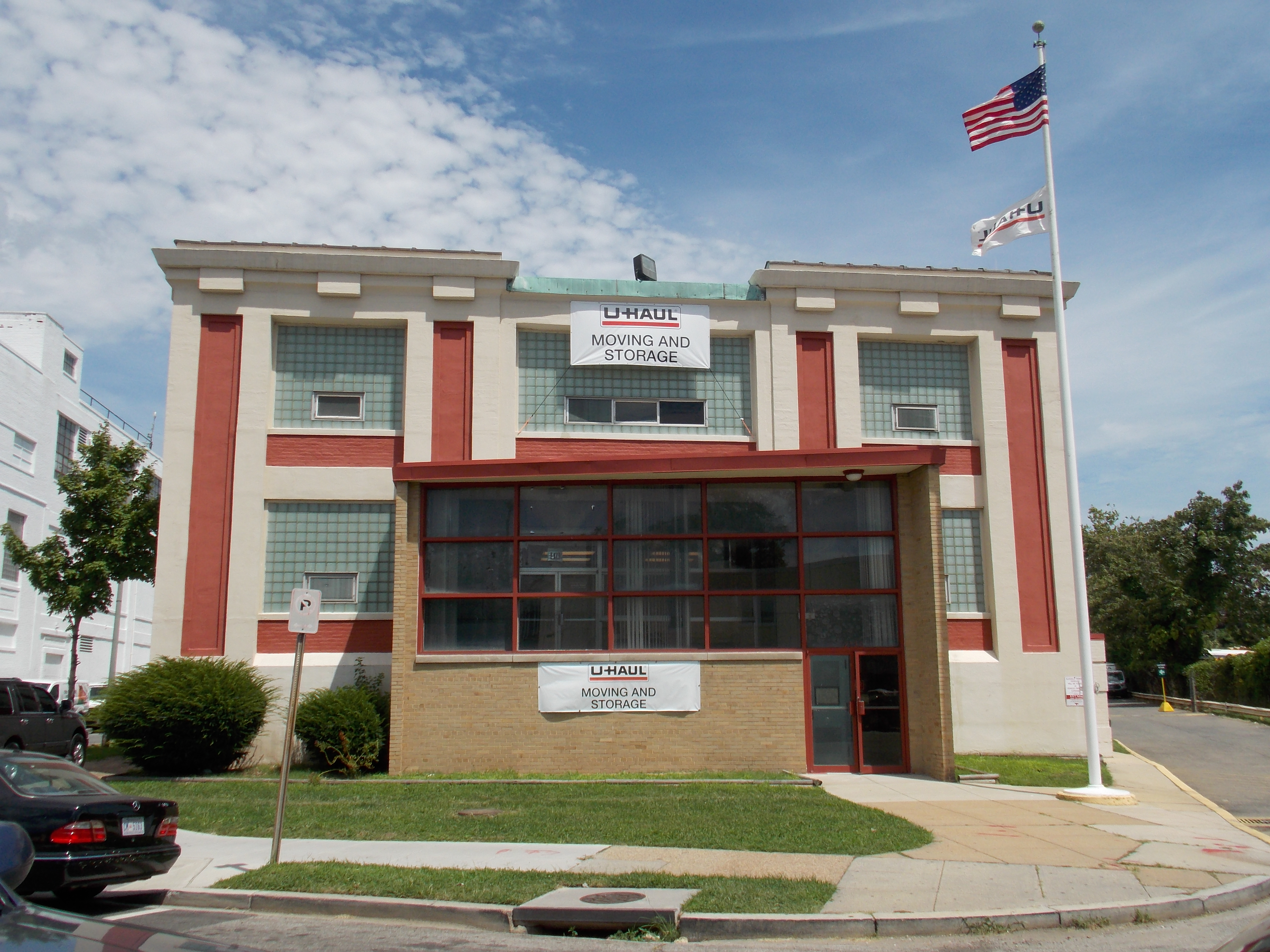
A U-Haul center in Washington, D.C.

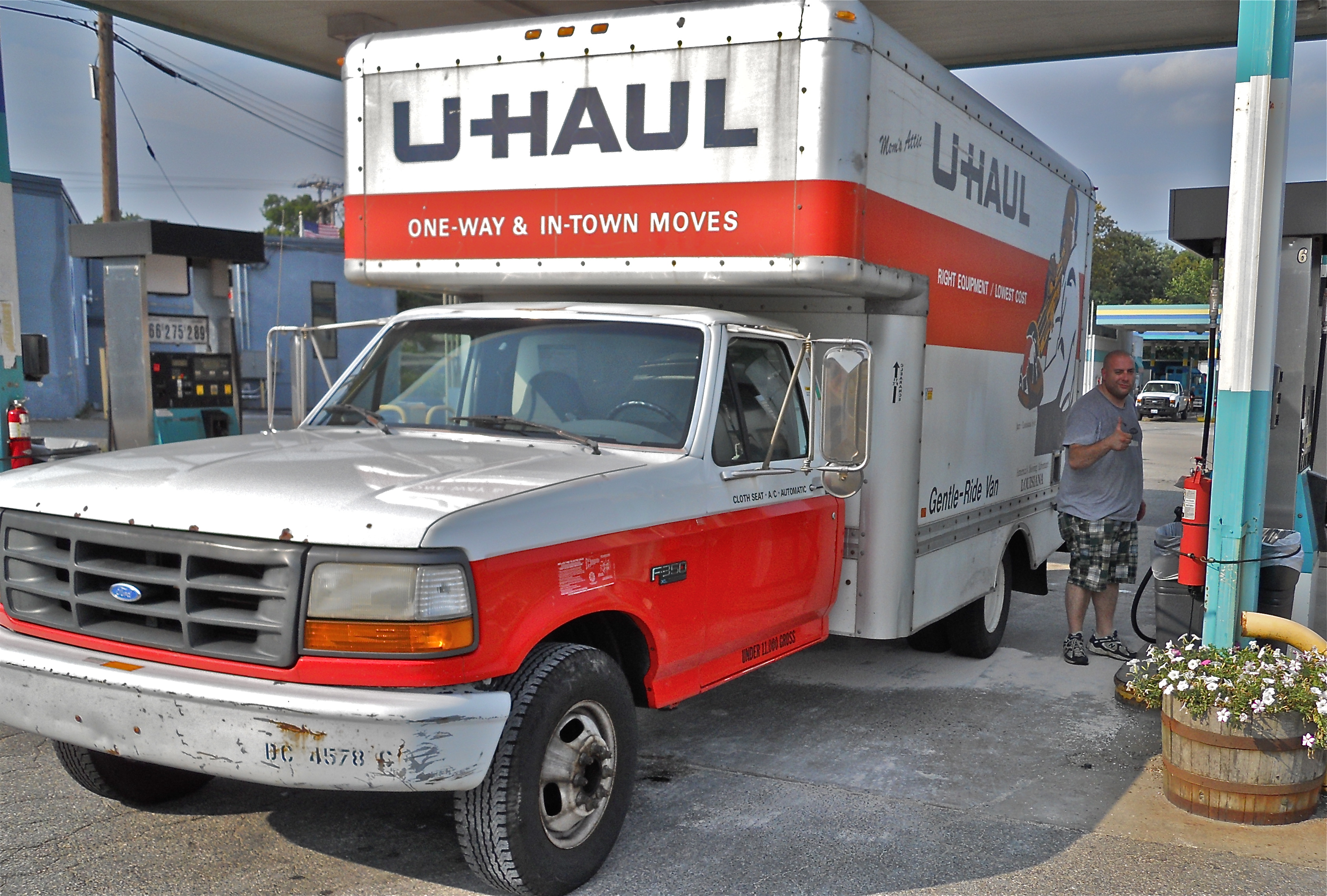
U-Haul truck being refueled

In 1945, at the age of 29, Leonard Shoen co-founded U-Haul with his wife, Anna Mary Carty, in the town of Ridgefield, Washington, with an investment of $5,000. He began building rental trailers and splitting the fees for their use with gas station owners whom he franchised as agents. He developed return rentals, one-way rentals and enlisted investors as partners in each trailer as methods of growth. By 1955, there were more than 10,000 U-Haul trailers on the road, and the brand was nationally known.

Distracted to some extent by growing his business, Shoen took time for multiple marriages (after the death of Anna Mary at age 34 due to a congenital heart defect) and he eventually had a total of 13 children with 4 wives each of whom he made stockholders. Shoen transferred all but 2% of control to his children when two of them, Edward and Mark, launched a successful takeover of the business in 1986. Family squabbling over the U-Haul empire turned to physical confrontations between some of his children at company meetings, even before the 1986 takeover, and accusations of murder for hire when Sam's daughter-in-law, Eva, was murdered in her home. The murderer was found and stated it was a robbery gone wrong; however, Sam continued to accuse Joe and Mark of being behind her death. The takeover sparked a major family dispute that led to a $461 million judgment in favor of Leonard Shoen and others. In 1999, 83-year-old Leonard Shoen suffered fatal injuries when he crashed into a telephone pole near his Las Vegas, Nevada, home; it was later ruled a suicide.

Between 1984 and 1992, U-Haul rented camper trailers that could be slept in. When this service was discontinued, the fiberglass trailers were sold off to the public.

The Shoen family, currently led by chairman and president Edward "Joe" Shoen, owns about 40% of the company through their AMERCO holding company. AMERCO filed for Chapter 11 bankruptcy in June 2003 and emerged in March 2004. The filing did not affect U-Haul operations.

In 2012, another moving and storage company, PODS, sued U-Haul in U.S. District Court for trademark infringement, claiming that U-Haul "improperly and unlawfully" used the word "pods" to describe its U-Box product. On September 25, 2014, a jury ruled that U-Haul had infringed on PODS' trademarks, causing confusion and damaging business for PODS. The jury found that U-Haul unjustly profited from mentioning the term on its marketing and advertising materials and began using the word only after PODS became famous as a brand name in the industry. The jury awarded PODS $62 million in damages. In 2014 UHaul sued HireAHelper for trademark infringement, a suit that was settled out of court.

Each December, U-Haul is used by UPS, USPS, and FedEx, to help temporarily expand fleets to handle a surge due to Christmas and other holiday volume.

From 2007 to 2020, the company operated Uhaul Car Share.

In June 2021, the company's division in West Virginia filed for Chapter 11 bankruptcy protection, blaming several challenges as a result of the decision, including management turnover, unprofitable locations, and litigation costs leading to poor cash flow and liquidity.

== Equipment ==
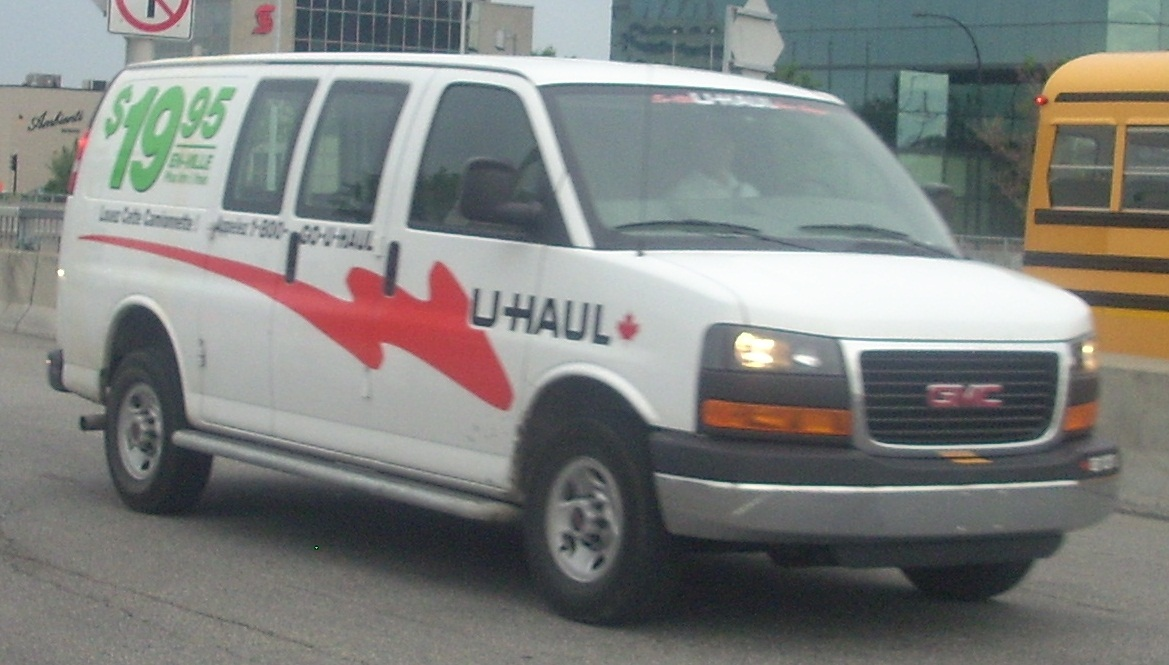
GMC Savana U-Haul van

U-Haul's rental fleet is composed of trucks, trailers, auto-transports, and various other equipment. Heavy duty pickup truck and van cabs manufactured by Ford, GMC, and Ram are mated with U-Haul manufactured truck boxes in fabrication plants located at various places in North America. The vehicles are all gas powered, with previous models offering diesel 17-foot (5.2 m) trucks that must be brought back to the same location where they were rented. Six truck sizes are available, ranging from 10 feet (3.0 m) to 26 feet (7.9 m), and multiple trailer sizes, in addition to a two-wheeled "Tow Dolly" and a four-wheeled "Auto Transport". U-Haul advertises that their trucks have lower decks which are built below the tops rather than above the rear tires like standard box trucks. Larger moving trucks also have a Luton body with an over the cab storage area. The trucks are painted with educational images of different states and provinces across the United States and Canada known as SuperGraphics. Pickup trucks and cargo vans are also available at most corporate owned centers and select neighborhood dealerships.

All trucks owned by the U-Haul corporation (including those assigned and decaled for use in Canada) display apportioned Arizona license plates. Newer trailers in the U-Haul fleet have apportioned plates, registered in a variety of states. In the Alaska and Hawaii markets, U-Haul registers equipment locally because those states do not have apportioned vehicle registration systems.

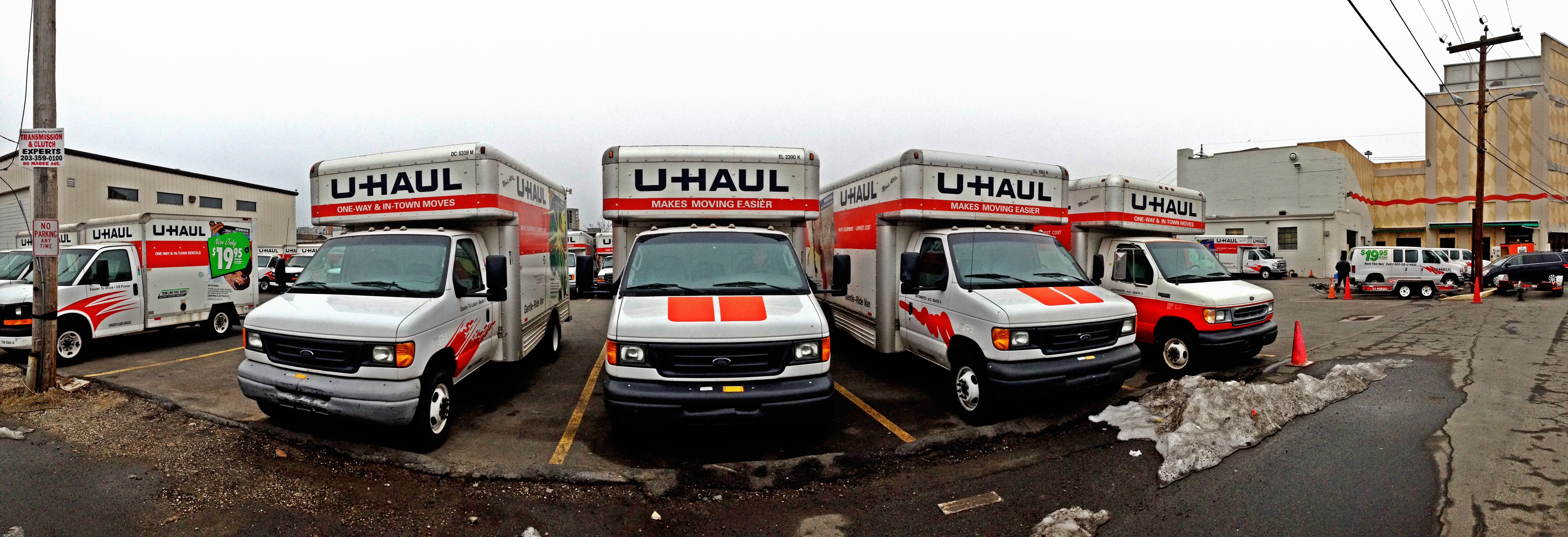
U-Haul rental trucks in Stamford, Connecticut in 2013

=== Storage space rentals ===
Some U-Haul facilities provide self-storage lockers for weekly or monthly rental, and rent portable storage lockers called U-Boxes on a monthly basis. The U-Boxes also serve to load customer possessions at one location that can then be shipped to another location. The storage facilities are located at most corporate locations.

=== Ford Explorer ban ===
In 2003, U-Haul enacted a policy of denying trailers rentals intended to be attached to a Ford Explorer. According to U-Haul: "U-Haul has chosen not to rent behind this tow vehicle based on our history of excessive costs in defending lawsuits involving Ford Explorer towing combinations. This policy does not involve safety issues. This is an unusual circumstance for U-Haul." This applies to all production years and models of the Explorer (including, for example, the Ford Explorer Sport Trac), regardless of tire brand that is attached. This comes from the high rate of failures of Firestone tires installed on the Ford Explorer.

Consumer Reports found that the policy was still in effect for the 2012 Ford Explorer. A company representative cited litigation costs as the reason behind the policy, "Every time we go to hire an attorney to defend a lawsuit, as soon as we say ‘Ford Explorer,’ they charge us more money."

== Safety problems ==
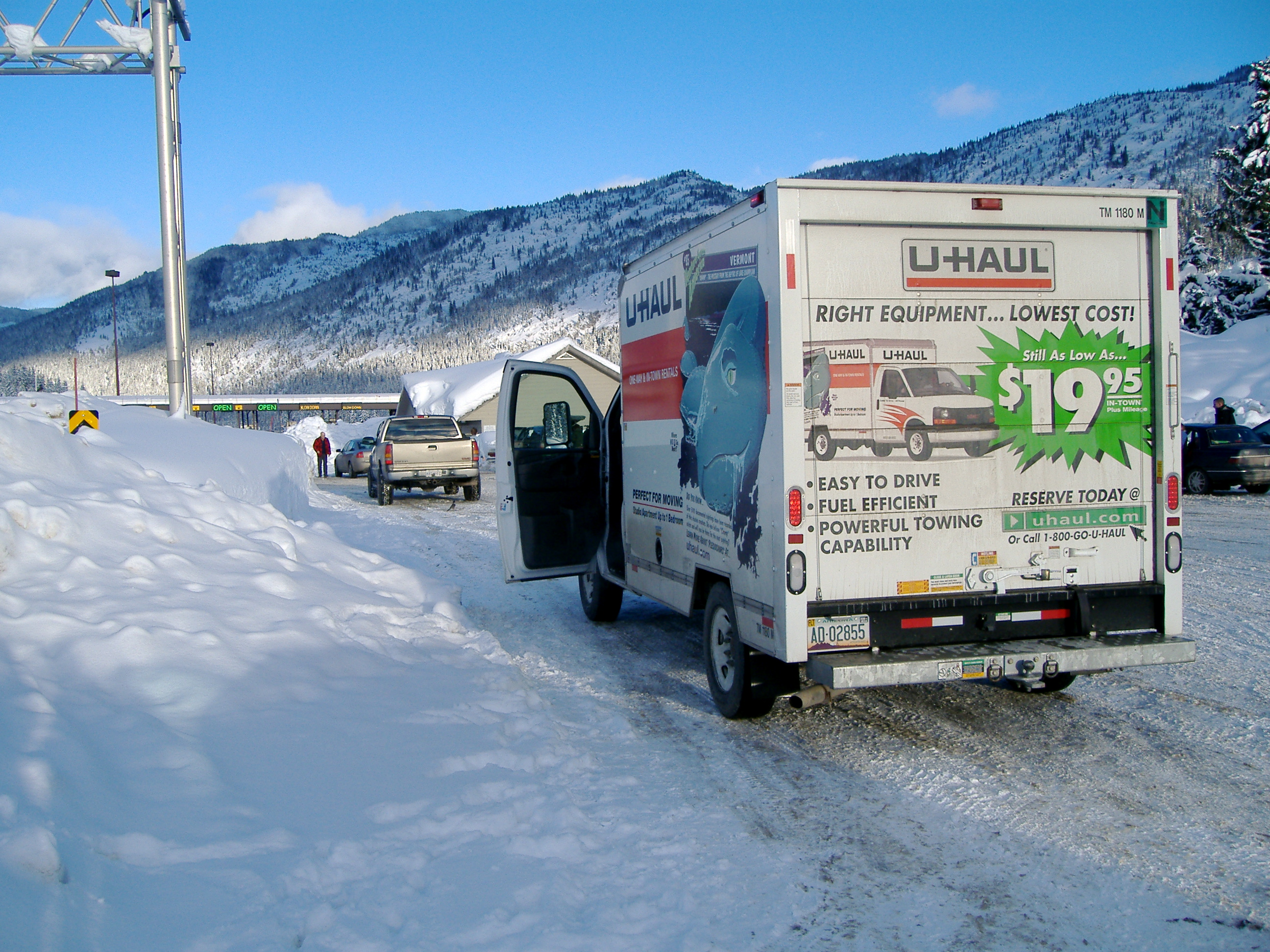
A U-Haul truck on the Coquihalla Highway in British Columbia

In Canada, various news agencies have found serious safety problems in U-Haul equipment. In July 2005, the Toronto Star reported statistics suggesting that about half of U-Haul vehicles in Ontario were not road safe. Shortly afterward, the Ministry of Transportation (Ontario) reported that, of 296 U-Haul vehicles inspected in the summer of 2005 (43.5% of all inspections performed), 58 (19.6%) were found to have out-of-service defects, meaning that they are not roadworthy. CTV followed in October 2005, conducting their own inspections across the country, and finding that all 13 rented U-Haul trucks failed to meet basic provincial safety standards.

Replying to the Toronto Star, the company's Canadian officials cited its inspection policies and procedures that employees and dealers are expected to follow. In response to the CTV results, Canadian U-Haul vice-president admitted to not heeding earlier warnings to improve their vehicles' safety conditions, and said older trucks would be replaced.

In October 2006, CTV's W-Five re-investigated U-Haul by renting trucks from nine locations across Canada. The rentals were then taken to mechanics for an inspection. Of the nine trucks rented, seven failed basic safety standards and were not deemed roadworthy; the other two, while roadworthy, had minor problems.

In 2007, a Los Angeles Times investigation found that U-Haul's lax trailer renting practices and poor brake maintenance contributed to several fishtailing crashes. The company was also cited as intentionally destroying evidence related to lawsuits for injuries and accidents.
