= Loren Ferré Rangel =

Puerto Rican environmentalist

María Lorenza Loren Ferré Rangel is a Trustee of the Conservation Trust of Puerto Rico, appointed jointly by Secretary of the Interior Gail Norton and Governor Aníbal Acevedo Vilá, after serving for several years as Chair of the Trust's Board of Advisors. She is also a Director of the Puerto Rico Center for the New Economy.

A member of the Ferré Rangel family and granddaughter of Luis A. Ferré, Ferré holds a B.A. from the College of the Holy Cross, an M.A. in Museum Studies from Boston University, and a Design Certificate from the New York School of Interior Design.

In 2018 she was the Chief Creative Officer at GFR Media, the Ferré-Rangel family holding company. She developed the City View Plaza office complex in Guaynabo, Puerto Rico.

She serves as a director of the Center for the New Economy, a San Juan-based think tank and is Vice President of the Ferré-Rangel Family Foundation.
