= Joe Shoen =

American businessman (born 1949)

- Born: March 28, 1949 (age 77); Phoenix, Arizona, U.S.
- Education: College of the Holy Cross (BA); Harvard University (MBA); Arizona State University (JD)
- Title: Chairman of AMERCO; President and CEO of U-Haul
- Father: Leonard Shoen
- Relatives: Mark Shoen (brother)

Edward Joseph Shoen (born March 28, 1949) is an American billionaire business executive and lawyer who is the president, chairman, and chief executive officer (CEO) of the storage rental company U-Haul. His efforts managing U-Haul have been credited with the company's expansion in the self-moving business. As of October 2026, Forbes estimates his net worth at $4 billion.

== Early life and education ==
Shoen was born on March 28, 1949, in Phoenix, Arizona. He was the third of six children born to Leonard S. Shoen and Anna Mary Carty, who helped operate the family's growing U-Haul business. His mother died of a heart attack in 1957 at the age of 34, leaving his father to raise the six children.

Shoen spent his childhood in Phoenix, then attended the College of the Holy Cross in Worcester, Massachusetts, where he graduated with a Bachelor of Arts in history in 1971. He then earned a Master of Business Administration (M.B.A.) from Harvard Business School in 1973. He wrote his master's thesis at Harvard on self-storage businesses. Immediately after graduating from Harvard, Shoen became a member of the executive board of U-Haul. He left the company briefly in 1978 to enroll at the Arizona State University School of Law, where he earned a Juris Doctor (J.D.) degree in 1981.

== Career ==
Shoen served as the president of U-Haul International from 1977 to 1979. During a struggle over control of the family business in 1986, Shoen and his brother Mark gained control of the company from their father Leonard. In November 1986, Shoen was named chairman of AMERCO following his father's retirement from the company. He became president of AMERCO in 1987. After gaining control, Shoen and his brother disposed of diversified businesses, reduced the workforce, and invested in U-Haul's truck and trailer fleet. By 1990, U-Haul had added nearly 5,000 dealerships over the preceding two years, bringing its network to approximately 9,300 independent dealers and 1,100 company-owned outlets in the United States and Canada.

In 1988, Shoen supported the issuance of 8,099 shares to five company executives, allowing him to hold controlling interest in the company. The stock transaction led to shareholder litigation in which an Arizona jury in 1994 awarded members of the opposing Shoen family faction $1.47 billion in compensatory damages and assessed $70 million in punitive damages against Shoen, amounts that were subsequently reduced by the court. In 1996, a federal bankruptcy judge approved a settlement under which AMERCO would pay the remaining $313.8 million owed on the judgment.

Shoen became a director of Amerco Real Estate Company in 1988, a director of U-Haul International in 1990, president of U-Haul International in 1991, and a director of Republic Western Insurance Company in 1997.

AMERCO filed for Chapter 11 bankruptcy protection in June 2003 to restructure debt following liquidity problems that had developed during the second half of 2002, while its operating subsidiaries other than Amerco Real Estate Company were excluded from the filing. The company emerged from Chapter 11 in March 2004 after restructuring more than $1.2 billion in debt and lease obligations, with creditors paid in full and existing shareholders retaining their equity.

In 2017, the W. P. Carey School of Business at Arizona State University named Shoen its Executive of the Year. In that same year, U-Haul's network had expanded from approximately 4,600 rental locations in 1987 to more than 21,000 locations across the U.S. and Canada.

In December 2022, AMERCO changed its corporate name to U-Haul Holding Company and transferred the listing of its voting and non-voting common stock from the Nasdaq to the New York Stock Exchange. As of 2026, Shoen remains chairman and president of U-Haul Holding Company and is its principal executive officer. Shoen and his brother Mark, together with Willow Grove Holdings LP and related entities, control approximately 50.1 percent of the company's voting common stock as of 2026.

== Personal life ==
As of 2017, Shoen lives in Phoenix, Arizona, with his wife, Sylvia, and two sons: Carty and Joseph.

== Bibliography ==
- Krueger, Luke (2007). A Noble Function: How U-Haul Moved America. Barricade Books. ISBN 978-1-56980-329-5.
