= Center for a New Economy =

Economic think tank in Puerto Rico

The Puerto Rico Center for the New Economy (CNE; Spanish: Centro para la Nueva Economía) is an economic think tank focused on the U.S. territory of Puerto Rico, founded in 1998. The CNE is funded by the private sector, including the Banco Popular de Puerto Rico, Cemex, First BanCorp, and Doral Bank, while its main foundation support comes from the Citi Foundation, the Ford Foundation and the Wilbur Marvin Foundation.

In 2006, the CNE partnered with the Brookings Institution in 2006, to produce an economic study of Puerto Rico, "The Economy of Puerto Rico: Restoring Economic Growth".
