= Randall Caudill =

American businessman

- Born: 1947 (age 78–79)
- Education: College of the Holy Cross; University of Oxford; Worcester College, Oxford (D.Phil.); Yale University

Randall L. W. Caudill (born 1947) is an American businessman. He is the president and founder of Dunsford Hill Capital Partners, a San Francisco-based financial consulting firm serving early stage health care and technology companies.

== Biography ==
Caudill is a native of Harlan, Iowa, where his father was a well known and respected dentist. He graduated from the College of the Holy Cross with a Bachelor of Arts in 1969 and was awarded a Rhodes Scholarship to pursue graduate studies in England at the University of Oxford. As a Rhodes Scholar, he earned a Doctor of Philosophy (D.Phil.) from Worcester College, Oxford, in 1975. His doctoral dissertation was titled, "Some literary evidence of the development of English virtuoso interests in the seventeenth century, with particular reference to the literature of travel". He then returned to the United States and earned a master's degree in public and private management from Yale University.

Caudill serves on VaxGen board's Audit Committee and Compensation Committee and the Genentech Contract Committee. From 1987 to 1997, Caudill was employed by Prudential Securities, where he established and headed the firm's San Francisco investment banking practice. He also served as head of Prudential's Mergers and Acquisitions Department and co-head of the investment bank.

In 2012 he was appointed Director of PLM International Inc, An equipment leasing company based in San Francisco.
