= List of SIAA baseball champions =

The Southern Intercollegiate Athletic Association was one of the earliest collegiate athletic conferences, formed in December 1894. Though many of its earliest schools departed in the 1920s to form the Southern Conference, and later the Southeastern Conference and Atlantic Coast Conference, it existed until 1942. Baseball competition was one of the sports sponsored from its earliest days.

== Champions by year ==
This is an incomplete list of champions of the SIAA.

Year	Team
1899	Sewanee; Texas
1901	North Carolina
1903	Alabama
1904	Trinity
1905	Auburn
1906	Georgia Tech
1907	No champion
1908	Georgia
1909	Alabama; Mississippi A&M
1910	Vanderbilt
1911	Georgia
1912	Vanderbilt
1913	Alabama
1914	Georgia
1915	Alabama
1916	Auburn
1917	Alabama
1918	Alabama
1919	Alabama; Georgia
1920	Alabama; Auburn; Georgia Tech
1921	Georgia Tech; Vanderbilt

=== Post SoCon ===
Year	Team
1927	Louisville
1933	Millsaps
1938	Louisville
1939	Louisville
