= List of Texas Longhorns baseball seasons =

This is a list of Texas Longhorns baseball seasons. The Texas Longhorns baseball program is a college baseball team that represents the University of Texas in the Big 12 Conference in the National Collegiate Athletic Association. The Longhorns have played their home games at UFCU Disch–Falk Field in Austin, Texas, since 1974.

The Longhorns have won 6 College World Series titles, the third most nationally, and have reached the ultimate event an unprecedented 38 times, more than any other program. They have appeared in the NCAA Division I baseball tournament 60 times, also the most of any program. Texas also holds the records for most individual CWS games won (88) and most overall NCAA tournament games won (248). It is the winningest program in college baseball history, and boasts 79 conference regular season championships, and 16 conference tournament championships.

== Season results ==
National champions	College World Series berth	NCAA tournament berth	Conference Tournament champions	Conference/Division Regular season Champions

Season	Head coach	Conference (Note: The Longhorns played as part of the Southern Intercollegiate Athletic Association from their first years. By 1913, they were playing in the Texas Intercollegiat Athletic Association. Texas led the creation of the Southwest Conference in 1915, which became the Big 12 Conference after a merger in 1997.)	Season results													Tournament results		Final poll (Note: Collegiate Baseball began team rankings in 1959. Baseball America began during the 1981 season. The Coaches' Poll (published by USA Today's Sports Weekly and ESPN) began publishing its rankings during the 1992 season.)		
Season	Head coach	Conference	Overall				Collegiate (Note: Includes games against collegiate competition only.)				Conference					Conference (Note: Includes Conference Tournaments, which began in 1976.)	Postseason (Note: Postseason play involving the NCAA Division I Baseball Championship began in 1947.)	BA	CB	Coaches
Season	Head coach	Conference	Wins	Losses	Ties	%	Wins	Losses	Ties	%	Wins	Losses	Ties	%	Finish	Conference	Postseason	BA	CB	Coaches
Texas Longhorns
1895	No Coach	SIAA	Incomplete Records													N/A				
1896	H. B. Beck	SIAA	Incomplete Records													N/A				
1897	F. Weikart	SIAA	6	5	0	.545	3	0	0	1.000	Incomplete Records					N/A				
1898	A. C. Ellis	SIAA	1	4	0	.200	1	0	0	1.000	Incomplete Records					N/A				
1899	A. C. Ellis	SIAA	11	1	1	.885	8	0	1	.944	8	0	1	.944	1st	N/A				
1900	Maurice Gordon Clarke	SIAA	14	2	1	.853	7	2	1	.750	Incomplete Records					N/A				
1901	A. C. Ellis	SIAA	11	2	0	.846	10	2	0	.833	Incomplete Records					N/A				
1902	A. C. Ellis	SIAA	13	3	1	.794	13	2	1	.844	Incomplete Records					N/A				
1903	A. C. Ellis	SIAA	12	7	0	.632	6	4	0	.600	Incomplete Records					N/A				
1904	Ralph Hutchinson	SIAA	18	10	1	.638	16	6	1	.717	Incomplete Records					N/A				
1905	Ralph Hutchinson	SIAA	17	8	0	.680	13	5	0	.722	Incomplete records				1st	N/A				
1906	Ralph Hutchinson	SIAA	10	9	0	.526	8	7	0	.533	Incomplete Records					N/A				
1907	H. R. Schenker	SIAA	16	8	0	.667	15	6	0	.714	Incomplete records				1st	N/A				
1908	Brooks Gordon	SIAA	16	12	1	.569	14	8	1	.630	Incomplete records				1st	N/A				
1909	A. C. Ellis	SIAA	13	14	0	.481	12	8	0	.600	Incomplete Records					N/A				
1910	C. A. Keith	SIAA	8	11	1	.425	7	9	0	.438	Incomplete Records					N/A				
1911	Billy Disch	SIAA	13	12	1	.519	13	10	1	.563	Incomplete Records					N/A				
1912	Billy Disch	SIAA	17	10	1	.625	17	7	1	.700	Incomplete Records					N/A				
1913	Billy Disch	TIAA	26	4	2	.844	24	4	2	.833	Incomplete Records				1st	N/A				
1914	Billy Disch	TIAA	30	5	0	.857	28	4	0	.875	Incomplete Records				1st	N/A				
1915	Billy Disch	SWC	25	5	0	.833	22	4	0	.846	12	2	0	.857	1st	N/A				
1916	Billy Disch	SWC	16	7	0	.696	16	6	0	.727	10	3	0	.769	1st	N/A				
1917	Billy Disch	SWC	12	3	0	.800	12	2	0	.857	4	1	0	.800	1st	N/A				
1918	Billy Disch	SWC	17	4	0	.810	17	1	0	.944	8	1	0	.889	1st	N/A				
1919	Billy Disch	SWC	22	3	1	.865	20	1	1	.932	12	0	0	1.000	1st	N/A				
1920	Billy Disch	SWC	18	7	1	.712	17	5	0	.773	9	2	0	.818	1st	N/A				
1921	Billy Disch	SWC	15	5	1	.738	15	3	1	.816	9	2	1	.792	1st	N/A				
1922	Billy Disch	SWC	16	6	2	.708	16	5	1	.750	10	3	1	.750	1st	N/A				
1923	Billy Disch	SWC	20	8	0	.714	16	8	0	.667	10	8	0	.556	3rd	N/A				
1924	Billy Disch	SWC	29	1	0	.967	28	1	0	.966	22	1	0	.957	1st	N/A				
1925	Billy Disch	SWC	18	7	1	.712	16	4	1	.786	11	2	1	.821	1st	N/A				
1926	Billy Disch	SWC	13	3	0	.813	13	2	0	.867	8	2	0	.800	1st	N/A				
1927	Billy Disch	SWC	16	6	1	.717	16	4	0	.800	16	4	0	.800	1st	N/A				
1928	Billy Disch	SWC	17	6	0	.739	17	4	0	.810	16	4	0	.800	1st	N/A				
1929	Billy Disch	SWC	18	7	1	.712	18	4	1	.804	16	4	1	.786	1st	N/A				
1930	Billy Disch	SWC	20	8	0	.714	20	4	0	.833	16	4	0	.800	1st	N/A				
1931	Billy Disch	SWC	12	6	0	.667	10	2	0	.833	8	2	0	.800	2nd	N/A				
1932	Billy Disch	SWC	12	8	0	.600	11	5	0	.688	11	5	0	.688	1st	N/A				
1933	Billy Disch	SWC	17	5	0	.773	13	3	0	.813	8	2	0	.800	2nd	N/A				
1934	Billy Disch	SWC	13	8	0	.619	8	5	0	.615	7	5	0	.583	2nd	N/A				
1935	Billy Disch	SWC	19	5	0	.792	11	3	0	.786	9	3	0	.750	1st	N/A				
1936	Billy Disch	SWC	18	4	0	.818	12	2	0	.857	12	1	0	.923	1st	N/A				
1937	Billy Disch	SWC	13	11	0	.542	11	6	0	.647	10	5	0	.667	2nd	N/A				
1938	Billy Disch	SWC	13	10	0	.565	12	4	0	.750	12	2	0	.857	1st	N/A				
1939	Billy Disch	SWC	18	6	0	.750	16	2	0	.889	15	0	0	1.000	1st	N/A				
1940	Bibb Falk	SWC	20	4	0	.833	15	4	0	.789	14	1	0	.933	1st	N/A				
1941	Bibb Falk	SWC	16	7	0	.696	14	3	0	.824	12	3	0	.800	1st	N/A				
1942	Bibb Falk	SWC	13	6	0	.684	11	4	0	.733	9	4	0	.800	2nd	N/A				
1943	Blair Cherry	SWC	10	7	0	.588	6	2	0	.750	6	2	0	.750	T-1st	N/A				
1944	Blair Cherry	SWC	8	10	0	.444	7	3	0	.700	—	—	—	—	(Note: The Southwest Conference did not crown a champion in 1944 due to war conditions.)	N/A				
1945	Blair Cherry	SWC	12	6	0	.667	11	1	0	.917	10	1	0	.909	1st	N/A				
1946	Bibb Falk	SWC	20	4	0	.833	19	2	0	.905	14	0	0	1.000	1st	N/A				
1947	Bibb Falk	SWC	20	4	0	.833	19	2	0	.905	14	1	0	.933	1st	N/A	Western playoff	N/A		
1948	Bibb Falk	SWC	20	2	0	.909	18	1	0	.947	13	1	0	.929	1st	N/A	—	N/A		
1949	Bibb Falk	SWC	23	7	0	.767	22	4	0	.846	12	3	0	.800	1st	N/A	National champions	N/A		
1950	Bibb Falk	SWC	27	6	0	.818	24	4	0	.857	14	1	0	.933	1st	N/A	National champions	N/A		
1951	Bibb Falk	SWC	17	6	0	.739	15	4	0	.789	11	4	0	.733	T-1st	N/A	—	N/A		
1952	Bibb Falk	SWC	19	9	0	.679	19	9	0	.679	11	4	0	.733	1st	N/A	College World Series	N/A		
1953	Bibb Falk	SWC	25	7	1	.773	24	7	1	.766	12	3	1	.781	T-1st	N/A	College World Series Runners-up	N/A		
1954	Bibb Falk	SWC	17	7	2	.692	15	7	2	.667	10	2	1	.808	1st	N/A	District 6 playoffs	N/A		
1955	Bibb Falk	SWC	10	13	1	.438	10	13	1	.438	7	8	1	.469	T-3rd	N/A	—	N/A		
1956	Bibb Falk	SWC	5	15	0	.250	5	13	0	.278	3	11	0	.214	6th	N/A	—	N/A		
1957	Bibb Falk	SWC	20	7	0	.741	19	5	0	.792	12	1	0	.923	1st	N/A	College World Series	N/A		
1958	Bibb Falk	SWC	21	8	0	.724	18	7	0	.720	13	2	0	.867	1st	N/A	District 6 playoffs	N/A		
1959	Bibb Falk	SWC	15	7	0	.682	13	7	0	.650	9	5	0	.643	2nd	N/A	—	—	—	—
1960	Bibb Falk	SWC	21	3	0	.875	19	3	0	.864	13	2	0	.867	1st	N/A	District 6 playoffs	—	11	—
1961	Bibb Falk	SWC	22	6	2	.767	20	5	2	.778	11	3	2	.750	1st	N/A	College World Series	—	8	—
1962	Bibb Falk	SWC	26	7	0	.788	22	7	0	.759	12	2	0	.857	1st	N/A	College World Series	—	3	—
1963	Bibb Falk	SWC	24	7	1	.766	21	7	1	.741	12	3	0	.800	T-1st	N/A	College World Series	—	3	—
1964	Bibb Falk	SWC	16	7	1	.688	16	7	1	.688	10	5	1	.656	T-2nd	N/A	—	—	12	—
1965	Bibb Falk	SWC	20	7	0	.741	18	7	0	.720	11	4	0	.733	1st	N/A	College World Series	—	8	—
1966	Bibb Falk	SWC	24	9	2	.714	21	9	2	.688	9	6	0	.600	T-1st	N/A	College World Series	—	6	—
1967	Bibb Falk	SWC	17	11	0	.607	17	11	0	.607	10	5	0	.667	T-1st	N/A	District 6 playoffs	—	17	—
1968	Cliff Gustafson	SWC	23	11	0	.676	23	11	0	.676	12	4	0	.750	1st	N/A	College World Series	—	6	—
1969	Cliff Gustafson	SWC	40	6	0	.870	35	6	0	.854	14	2	0	.875	1st	N/A	College World Series	—	4	—
1970	Cliff Gustafson	SWC	45	8	0	.849	39	8	0	.830	14	1	0	.933	1st	N/A	College World Series	—	3	—
1971	Cliff Gustafson	SWC	35	11	0	.761	33	11	0	.750	15	3	0	.833	1st	N/A	District 6 playoffs	—	17	—
1972	Cliff Gustafson	SWC	50	9	0	.847	40	9	0	.816	12	6	0	.667	T-1st	N/A	College World Series	—	4	—
1973	Cliff Gustafson	SWC	50	7	0	.877	50	7	0	.877	15	3	0	.833	1st	N/A	College World Series	—	4	—
1974	Cliff Gustafson	SWC	54	8	0	.871	54	8	0	.871	20	4	0	.833	1st	N/A	College World Series	—	4	—
1975	Cliff Gustafson	SWC	59	6	0	.908	56	6	0	.903	23	1	0	.958	1st	N/A	National champions	—	1	—
1976	Cliff Gustafson	SWC	48	16	0	.750	42	16	0	.724	19	5	0	.792	1st	N/A	South Central Regional	—	9	—
1977	Cliff Gustafson	SWC	53	10	0	.841	53	9	0	.855	17	7	0	.708	2nd	2nd	—	—	18	—
1978	Cliff Gustafson	SWC	36	17	0	.679	36	16	0	.692	12	12	0	.500	5th	—	—	—	—	—
1979	Cliff Gustafson	SWC	61	8	0	.884	55	8	0	.873	22	2	0	.917	1st	1st	College World Series	—	4	—
1980	Cliff Gustafson	SWC	53	13	0	.803	53	13	0	.803	18	6	0	.750	1st	1st	Central Regional	—	11	—
1981	Cliff Gustafson	SWC	62	11	1	.845	61	11	1	.842	16	5	0	.762	1st	1st	College World Series	3	3	—
1982	Cliff Gustafson	SWC	59	7	0	.894	59	6	0	.908	12	4	0	.750	1st	1st	College World Series	2	4	—
1983	Cliff Gustafson	SWC	66	14	0	.825	66	14	0	.825	18	3	0	.857	1st	1st	National champions	1	2	—
1984	Cliff Gustafson	SWC	60	14	0	.811	60	14	0	.811	16	5	0	.762	1st	1st	College World Series Runners-up	3	2	—
1985	Cliff Gustafson	SWC	64	14	0	.821	64	14	0	.821	16	5	0	.762	1st	2nd	College World Series Runners-up	2	2	—
1986	Cliff Gustafson	SWC	51	14	0	.785	51	14	0	.785	16	5	0	.762	T-1st	T-3rd	Central Regional	7	16	—
1987	Cliff Gustafson	SWC	61	11	0	.847	61	11	0	.847	18	3	0	.857	1st	1st	College World Series	3	3	—
1988	Cliff Gustafson	SWC	58	11	1	.836	58	11	1	.836	18	2	1	.881	1st	1st	Central Regional Finals	10	10	—
1989	Cliff Gustafson	SWC	54	18	0	.750	54	18	0	.750	14	7	0	.667	3rd	2nd	College World Series Runners-up	3	2	—
1990	Cliff Gustafson	SWC	51	17	0	.750	51	17	0	.750	15	5	0	.750	2nd	1st	Central Regional	10	13	—
1991	Cliff Gustafson	SWC	48	19	0	.716	48	18	0	.727	14	7	0	.667	1st	1st	Central Regional	10	11	—
1992	Cliff Gustafson	SWC	48	17	0	.738	48	17	0	.738	28	8	0	.778	1st	(Note: No tournament in 1992)	College World Series	4	4	4
1993	Cliff Gustafson	SWC	51	16	0	.761	51	16	0	.761	11	7	0	.611	T-2nd	2nd	College World Series	6	7	6
1994	Cliff Gustafson	SWC	43	21	0	.672	43	21	0	.672	9	9	0	.500	4th	1st	Central II Regional	14	14	15
1995	Cliff Gustafson	SWC	44	19	0	.698	44	19	0	.698	14	10	0	.583	4th	3rd	Midwest II Regional	18	21	23
1996	Cliff Gustafson	SWC	39	24	0	.619	39	24	0	.619	17	7	0	.708	1st	2nd	Central Regional	19	18	16
1997	Augie Garrido	Big 12	29	22	0	.569	29	22	0	.569	12	15	0	.444	7th	—	—	—	—	—
1998	Augie Garrido	Big 12	23	32	1	.420	23	32	1	.420	11	18	0	.379	8th	—	—	—	—	—
1999	Augie Garrido	Big 12	36	26	0	.581	36	26	0	.581	17	13	0	.567	6th	T-5th	Houston Regional	—	—	—
2000	Augie Garrido	Big 12	46	21	0	.687	46	21	0	.687	19	10	0	.655	4th	T-5th	College World Series	7	10	7
2001	Augie Garrido	Big 12	36	26	0	.581	36	26	0	.581	19	11	0	.633	3rd	T-7th	Stanford Regional	—	—	28
2002	Augie Garrido	Big 12	57	15	0	.792	57	15	0	.792	19	8	0	.704	1st	1st	National champions	1	1	1
2003	Augie Garrido	Big 12	50	21	0	.704	50	20	0	.714	19	8	0	.704	T-2nd	1st	College World Series	4	4	4
2004	Augie Garrido	Big 12	58	15	0	.795	58	15	0	.795	19	7	0	.731	1st	T-3rd	College World Series Runners-up	2	2	2
2005	Augie Garrido	Big 12	56	16	0	.778	56	16	0	.778	16	10	0	.615	3rd	T-3rd	National champions	1	1	1
2006	Augie Garrido	Big 12	41	21	0	.661	41	21	0	.661	19	7	0	.731	1st	2–1 in Pool Play	Austin Regional	12	12	17
2007	Augie Garrido	Big 12	46	17	0	.730	46	17	0	.730	21	6	0	.778	1st	2–1 in Pool Play	Round Rock Regional	14	11	17
2008	Augie Garrido	Big 12	39	22	0	.639	39	22	0	.639	15	12	0	.556	5th	1st	Houston Regional	21	25	21
2009	Augie Garrido	Big 12	50	16	1	.754	50	16	1	.754	17	9	1	.648	1st	1st	College World Series Runners-up	2	2	2
2010	Augie Garrido	Big 12	50	13	0	.794	50	13	0	.794	24	3	0	.889	1st	0–3 in Pool Play	Austin Super Regional	9	9	9
2011	Augie Garrido	Big 12	49	19	0	.721	49	19	0	.721	19	8	0	.704	1st	T-3rd	College World Series	6	7	7
2012	Augie Garrido	Big 12	30	22	0	.577	30	22	0	.577	14	10	0	.583	3rd	T-7th	—	—	—	—
2013	Augie Garrido	Big 12	27	24	0	.529	27	24	0	.529	7	17	0	.292	9th	—	—	—	—	—
2014	Augie Garrido	Big 12	46	21	0	.687	46	21	0	.687	13	11	0	.542	5th	T-3rd	College World Series	4	3	3
2015	Augie Garrido	Big 12	30	27	0	.526	30	27	0	.526	11	13	0	.458	5th	1st	Dallas Regional	—	—	—
2016	Augie Garrido	Big 12	25	32	0	.439	25	32	0	.439	10	14	0	.417	7th	T-3rd	—	—	—	—
2017	David Pierce	Big 12	39	24	0	.619	39	24	0	.619	11	12	0	.478	6th	2nd	Long Beach Regional	24	28	25
2018	David Pierce	Big 12	42	23	0	.646	42	23	0	.646	17	7	0	.708	1st	T-7th	College World Series	7	7	7
2019	David Pierce	Big 12	27	27	0	.500	27	27	0	.500	7	16	0	.304	9th	—	—	—	—	—
2020	David Pierce	Big 12	14	3	0	.824	14	3	0	.824	—	—	—	—	N/A	N/A	N/A	—	15	22
2021	David Pierce	Big 12	50	17	0	.746	50	17	0	.746	17	7	0	.708	1st	4th	College World Series	3	3	3
2022	David Pierce	Big 12	47	22	0	.681	47	22	0	.681	14	10	0	.583	5th	2nd	College World Series	9	7	8
2023	David Pierce	Big 12	42	22	0	.656	42	22	0	.656	15	9	0	.625	1st	T-7th	Stanford Super Regional	9	11	12
2024	David Pierce	Big 12	36	24	0	.600	36	24	0	.600	20	10	0	.667	3rd	T-9th	College Station Regional	—	—	—
2025	Jim Schlossnagle	SEC	44	14	0	.759	44	14	0	.759	22	8	0	.733	1st	T-5th	Austin Regional	-	-	-
