= 1910 College Baseball All-Southern Team =

All-star college baseball team

The 1910 College Baseball All-Southern Team consists of baseball players selected at their respective positions after the 1910 IAAUS baseball season.

== All-Southerns ==
Position	Name	School
Pitcher	Davidson	Mercer
Pitcher	Kid Collier	Georgia Tech
Pitcher	Wilson	Georgia Tech
Catcher	McAllister	Tennessee
First baseman	McCoy	Auburn
Second baseman	Garnett Brooks	Georgia
Third baseman	Harry Holland	Georgia Tech
Shortstop	Baumgartner	Alabama
Outfielder	Burroughs	Mercer
Outfielder	Tinsley Ginn	Georgia
Outfielder	Gray	Mercer
Utility	Ray Morrison	Vanderbilt

All players were selected by John Heisman.
