= 1913 College Baseball All-Southern Team =

All-star college baseball team

The 1913 College Baseball All-Southern Team consists of baseball players selected at their respective positions after the 1913 NCAA baseball season.

== All-Southerns ==
| Position | Name | School |
|---|---|---|
| Pitcher | Corley | Georgia |
| Pitcher | Morris | Georgia |
| Pitcher | Ezell | Clemson |
| Catcher | H. Hutchens | Georgia |
| First baseman | Davenport | Auburn |
| Second baseman | Fairfax Montague | Georgia Tech |
| Third baseman | Turner | Vanderbilt |
| Shortstop | Joplin | Alabama |
| Outfielder | Tinsley Ginn | Georgia |
| Outfielder | Bob McWhorter | Georgia |
| Outfielder | H. A. McDowell | Alabama |
| Utility | Rice | Mercer |

All players were selected by John Heisman.
