= 1909 College Baseball All-Southern Team =

All-star college baseball team

The 1909 College Baseball All-Southern Team consists of baseball players selected at their respective positions after the 1909 IAAUS baseball season.

== All-Southerns ==
Position	Name	School	Selectors
Pitcher	Bob Gantt	Trinity	H
Pitcher	Tucker	Alabama	H, NT
Pitcher	J. E. Mayer	Georgia Tech	H
Pitcher	Baney Mitchell	Mississippi A&M	NT
Pitcher	Bob Mitchell	Mississippi	NT
Pitcher	Frank Allen	SPU	NT
Pitcher	Sawrie	Sewanee	NT
Catcher	Corlis Buchanan	Georgia Tech	H, NT [as SS]
Catcher	Vaughn	Alabama	NT
First baseman	McCoy	Auburn	H
First baseman	Hodgson	Tennessee	NT
Second baseman	Claud Derrick	Georgia	H, NT
Third baseman	W. West	Trinity	H
Shortstop	Del Pratt	Alabama	H, NT [as 3B]
Outfielder	Cochran	Clemson	H
Outfielder	W. Baker	Tennessee	H
Outfielder	Goldnamer	Vanderbilt	H
Outfielder	Wallace Pinson	Vanderbilt	NT
Outfielder	Carlin	Tennessee	NT
Outfielder	Gillem	Sewanee	NT
Utility	Smith	Auburn	H

== Key ==
H = John Heisman's selection.

NT = published in the Nashville Tennessean, meant to be selection of all the various colleges.
