= 1916 College Baseball All-Southern Team =

All-star college baseball team

The 1916 College Baseball All-Southern Team consists of baseball players selected at their respective positions after the 1916 NCAA baseball season.

== All-Southerns ==
Position	Name	School
Pitcher	Bowman	Alabama
Pitcher	Suggs	Auburn
Pitcher	Kent Morrison	Vanderbilt
Catcher	Clements	Mercer
First baseman	Hamilton	Alabama
Second baseman	C. Smith	Georgia Tech
Third baseman	Horace Clements	Georgia
Shortstop	Davidson	Vanderbilt
Outfielder	Albert "Duck" Swann	Mercer
Outfielder	Pendergrast	Auburn
Outfielder	Irwin	Georgia

All players were selected by Jake Zellars.
