= 1914 College Baseball All-Southern Team =

All-star college baseball team

The 1914 College Baseball All-Southern Team consists of baseball players selected at their respective positions after the 1914 NCAA baseball season.

== All-Southerns ==
Position	Name	School
Pitcher	Frank Hunt	Mercer
Pitcher	Smooey Eubanks	Georgia Tech
Pitcher	Hitchcock	Georgia
Catcher	Doc Witherington	Georgia Tech
Catcher	Wells	Alabama
First baseman	Webb	Clemson
Second baseman	Harrison	Georgia
Third baseman	Cargile	Alabama
Shortstop	Moulton	Auburn
Outfielder	Tinsley Ginn	Georgia
Outfielder	Bob McWhorter	Georgia
Outfielder	Thomason	Tennessee
Utility	Fairfax Montague	Georgia Tech

All players were selected by John Heisman.
