= 1917 College Baseball All-Southern Team =

All-star college baseball team

The 1917 College Baseball All-Southern Team consists of baseball players selected at their respective positions after the 1917 NCAA baseball season.

== All-Southerns ==
Position	Name	School
Pitcher	T. H. Rentz	Mercer
Pitcher	Tom Philpot	Georgia
Pitcher	Stevens	Mercer
Catcher	Clements	Mercer
First baseman	Griffin	Auburn
Second baseman	Rex Sosebee	Mercer
Third baseman	Whitey Davis	Georgia
Shortstop	Hill	Georgia Tech
Outfielder	Bass	Mercer
Outfielder	Pendergrast	Auburn
Outfielder	Moon Ducote	Auburn
Utility	Vernon Wooten	Georgia

All players were selected by Mercer coach George Stinson.
