= 1900 Texas Longhorns baseball team =

American college baseball season

1900 Texas Longhorns baseball
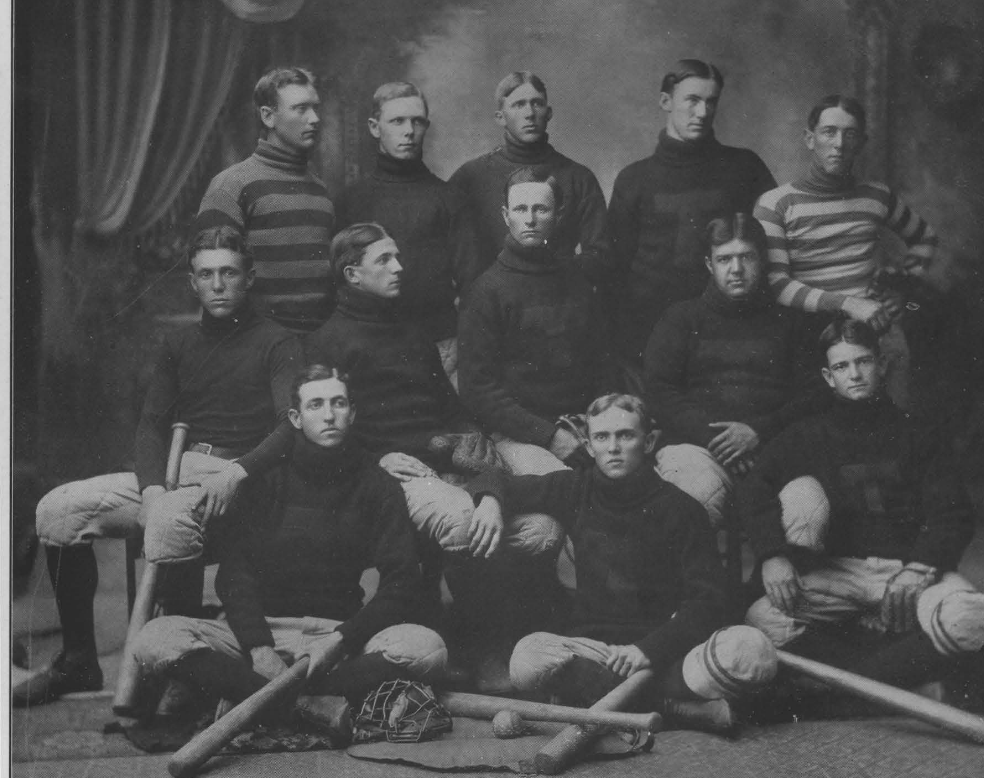
- Conference: Southern Intercollegiate Athletic Association
- Record: Overall: 14–2–1; Collegiate: 7–2–1 (5–2–1 SIAA)
- Head coach: Maurice Gordon Clarke (1st season)
- Captain: J.M. Taylor
- Home stadium: Varsity Athletic Field

The 1900 Texas Longhorns baseball team represented the Texas Longhorns baseball program for the University of Texas in the 1900 college baseball season. Maurice Gordon Clarke coached the team in his 1st season at Texas.

== Schedule ==
1900 Texas Longhorns baseball game log
Legend: = Win = Loss = Tie

Regular season (14–2)
Date	Opponent	Stadium	Score	Overall record	Collegiate Record	SIAA record
April 5	Austin Semi-Pro^{#}	Varsity Athletic Field • Austin, TX	W 5–1	1–0	—	—
April 11	Austin Semi-Pro^{#}	Varsity Athletic Field • Austin, TX	W 21–7	2–0	—	—
April 12	Austin Semi-Pro^{#}	Varsity Athletic Field • Austin, TX	W 10–3	3–0	—	—
April 12	Southwestern*	Varsity Athletic Field • Austin, TX	W 13–3	4–0	1–0	—
April 14	Austin YMCA^{#}	Varsity Athletic Field • Austin, TX	W 7–4	5–0	—	—
April 18	Austin YMCA^{#}	Varsity Athletic Field • Austin, TX	W 6–1	6–0	—	—
April 21	at San Antonio Bronchos^{#}	San Antonio, TX	W 3–1	7–0	—	—
April 26	Austin College*	Varsity Athletic Field • Austin, TX	W 18–0	8–0	2–0	—
May 3	Austin YMCA^{#}	Varsity Athletic Field • Austin, TX	W 13–1	9–0	—	—
May 7	at Jefferson Military	Jefferson, MS	W 8–3	10–0	3–0	1–0
May 8	at Jefferson Military	Jefferson, MS	T 7–7 ^{11}	10–0–1	3–0–1	1–0–1
May 9	at Ole Miss	Oxford, MS	W 3–1	11–0–1	4–0–1	2–0–1
May 10	at Ole Miss	Oxford, MS	W 9–0	12–0–1	5–0–1	3–0–1
May 11	at Vanderbilt	Curry Field • Nashville, TN	W 3–2	13–0–1	6–0–1	4–0–1
May 12	at Vanderbilt	Curry Field • Nashville, TN	L 4–14	13–1–1	6–1–1	4–1–1
May 14	at Sewanee	Sewanee, TN	W 3–2	14–1–1	7–1–1	5–1–1
May 15	at Sewanee	Sewanee, TN	L 3–4	14–2–1	7–2–1	5–2–1

* indicates a non-conference game. ^{#} indicates a non-collegiate game. All rankings from D1Baseball on the date of the contest.
