= 1918 College Baseball All-Southern Team =

All-star college baseball team

The 1918 College Baseball All-Southern Team consists of baseball players selected at their respective positions after the 1918 NCAA baseball season.

== All-Southerns ==
Position	Name	School
Pitcher	George "Breezy" Winn	Mercer
Pitcher	Luther Bloodworth	Mercer
Pitcher	George Johnston	Auburn
Catcher	Morgan	Mercer
First baseman	Burnette	Mercer
Second baseman	Shorty Guill	Georgia Tech
Third baseman	Whitey Davis	Georgia
Shortstop	Scott	Auburn
Outfielder	Cameron Satterfield	Georgia
Outfielder	Bass	Mercer
Outfielder	T. H. Bonner	Auburn
Utility	Tom Philpot	Georgia

All players were selected by Mercer coach George Stinson.
