= 1911 Mississippi A&M Aggies baseball team =

American college baseball season

1911 Mississippi A&M Aggies baseball
- Conference: Southern Intercollegiate Athletic Association
- Record: 16–7 (10–6 SIAA)
- Head coach: W. D. Chadwick

The 1911 Mississippi A&M Aggies baseball team represented the Mississippi Aggies of Mississippi A&M in the 1911 NCAA baseball season.

== Schedule and results ==
Legend
Mississippi A&M win
Mississippi A&M loss
Tie

1911 Mississippi A&M Aggies baseball game log

Regular season
Date	Opponent	Site/stadium	Score	Overall record	SIAA record
	at Mississippi College*	Clinton, MS	W 5–2	1–0	
	at Mississippi College*	Clinton, MS	W 2–1	2–0	
	at Mississippi College*	Clinton, MS	L 2–5	2–1	
	Auburn	Starkville, MS	L 3–5	2–2	0–1
	Auburn	Starkville, MS	W 6–0	3–2	1–1
	Auburn	Starkville, MS	L 1–2	3–3	1–2
	at Tulane	New Orleans, LA	W 5–4	4–3	2–2
	at Millsaps*	Jackston, MS	W 2–1	5–3	
	at Alabama	Tuscaloosa, AL	L 1–6	5–4	2–3
	at Alabama	Tuscaloosa, AL	L 3–4	5–5	2–4
	at Alabama	Tuscaloosa, AL	W 4–1	6–5	3–4
	Mississippi College*	Starkville, MS	W' 6–2	7–5	
	Mississippi College*	Starkville, MS	W 5–0	8–5	
	Mississippi College*	Starkville, MS	W 4–3	9–5	
	LSU	Starkville, MS	W 1–0	10–5	4–4
	LSU	Starkville, MS	L 1–2	10–6	4–5
	LSU	Starkville, MS	W 5–1	11–6	5–5
	Cumberland	Starkville, MS	W 2–0	12–6	6–5
	Cumberland	Starkville, MS	W 3–1	13–6	7–5
	Cumberland	Starkville, MS	W 3–2	14–6	8–5
	Ole Miss	Starkville, MS	L 0–3	14–7	8–6
	Ole Miss	Starkville, MS	W 7–2	15–7	9–6
	Ole Miss	Starkville, MS	W 3–2	16–7	10–6
