= 1915 College Baseball All-Southern Team =

College baseball award

The 1915 College Baseball All-Southern Team consists of baseball players selected at their respective positions after the 1915 NCAA baseball season.

== All-Southerns ==
| Position | Name | School |
|---|---|---|
| Pitcher | Hitchcock | Georgia |
| Pitcher | Corley | Georgia |
| Pitcher | Frank Hunt | Mercer |
| Pitcher | Senter | Georgia Tech |
| Pitcher | Bowman | Alabama |
| Catcher | Hairston | Auburn |
| Catcher | Morrison | Georgia Tech |
| Catcher | Wells | Alabama |
| First baseman | Frentz | Mississippi A&M |
| Second baseman | Harrison | Georgia |
| Third baseman | McMillan | Clemson |
| Shortstop | Clements | Georgia |
| Outfielder | Cargyle | Alabama |
| Outfielder | Noble | Mississippi A&M |
| Outfielder | Thomason | Tennessee |

All players were selected by Joe Bean.
