= 1920 Georgia Tech Golden Tornado baseball team =

American college baseball season

1920 Georgia Tech Yellow Jackets baseball
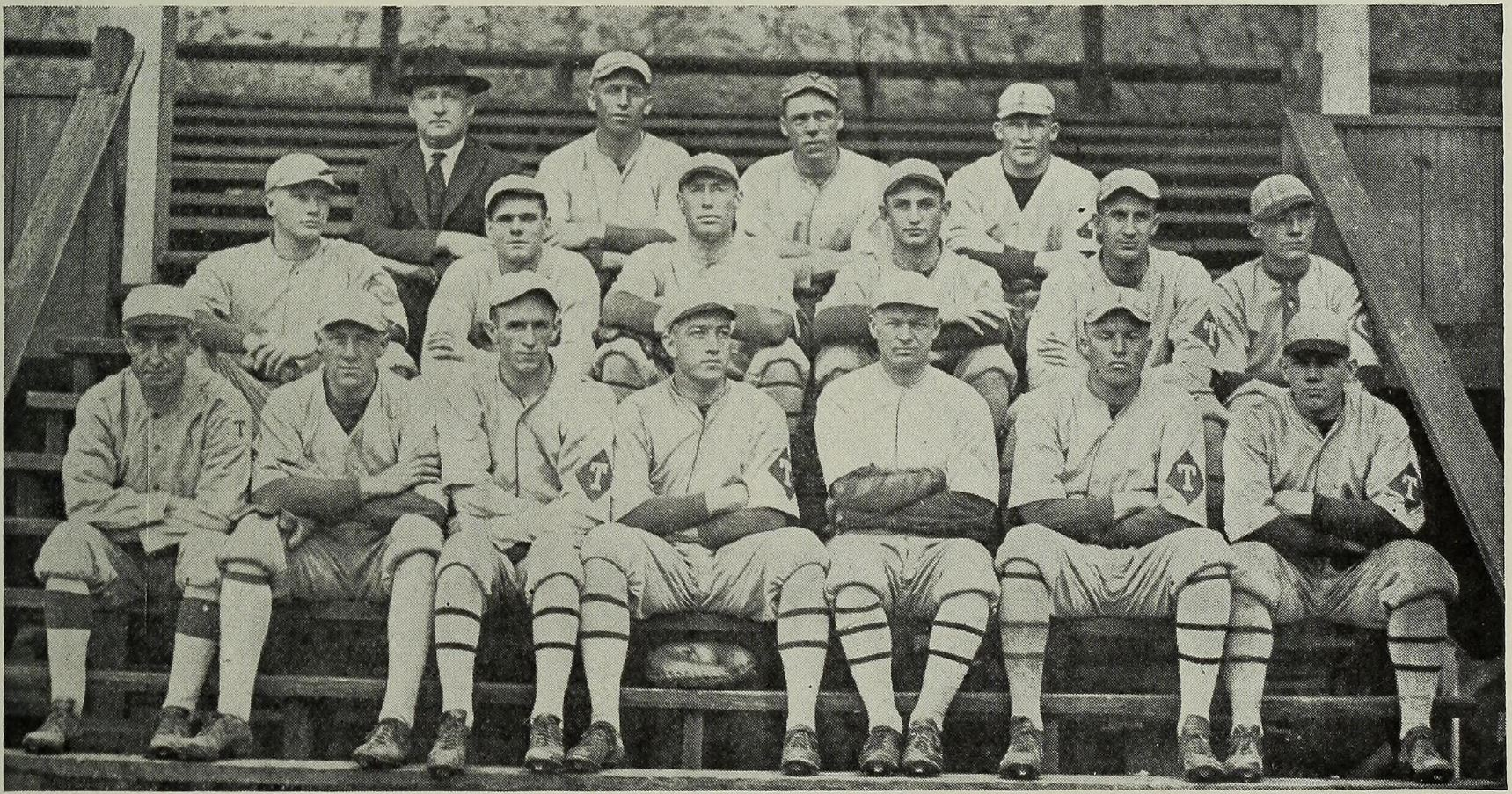

SIAA co-champion
- Conference: Southern Intercollegiate Athletic Association
- Record: 16–2 (12–2 SIAA)
- Head coach: Joe Bean
- Home stadium: Grant Field

The 1920 Georgia Tech Golden Tornado baseball team represented the Georgia Tech Golden Tornado of the Georgia Institute of Technology in the 1920 NCAA baseball season.

== Schedule and results ==
Legend
Georgia Tech win
Georgia Tech loss
Tie

1920 Georgia Tech Yellow Jackets baseball game log

Regular season
Date	Opponent	Site/stadium	Score	Overall record	SIAA record
March 26	Erskine		W 4–2	1–0	
March 27	Erskine		W 18–0	2–0	
April 2	Mercer		W 3–0	3–0	
April 7	Philadelphia Athletics		L 1–5 (Note: Exhibition)	3–0	
April 10	Oglethorpe		L 1–5	3–1	
April 15	Florida		W 8–0	4–1	
April 16	Auburn		W 6–2	5–1	
April 17	Auburn		L 4–5	5–2	
April 23	Clemson		W 2–1	6–2	
April 24	Clemson		W 5–4	7–2	
April 26	Florida		W 9–3	8–2	
April 27	Florida		W 6–3	9–2	
April 30	Davidson		W 6–2	10–2	
May 1	Davidson		W 5–0	11–2	
May 7	Vanderbilt		W 5–4	12–2	
May 8	Vanderbilt		W 4–2	13–2	
May 12	Wofford		W 4–2	14–2	
May 14	Furman		W 12–1	15–2	
May 15	Furman		W 4–0	16–2	
