= 1902 college baseball season =

Seasons
- ← 1901 1903 →

The 1902 college baseball season, play of college baseball in the United States began in the spring of 1902. Play largely consisted of regional matchups, some organized by conferences, and ended in June. No national championship event was held until 1947.

== New programs ==
- Baylor, Davidson, and North Carolina A&T played their first varsity seasons.

== Conference winners ==
This is a partial list of conference champions from the 1902 season.

Conference	Regular season winner
Western	Michigan

== Conference standings ==
The following is an incomplete list of conference standings:

1902 Western Conference baseball standings
	Conf.				Overall
Team	W		L	PCT	W		L	PCT
Michigan ‍†‍‍	5	–	0	1.000		–		–
Illinois ‍‍‍	8	–	3	.727		–		–
Chicago ‍‍‍	7	–	7	.500		–		–
Northwestern ‍‍‍	3	–	6	.333		–		–
Wisconsin ‍‍‍	1	–	7	.125		–		–
† – Conference champion
