= 1910 Georgia Bulldogs baseball team =

American college baseball season

1910 Georgia Bulldogs baseball
- Conference: Southern Intercollegiate Athletic Association
- Head coach: W. J. Lewis; Frank Anderson
- Home stadium: Herty Field

The 1910 Georgia Bulldogs baseball team represented the Georgia Bulldogs of the University of Georgia in the 1910 IAAUS baseball season.
