= 1909 Mississippi A&M Aggies baseball team =

American college baseball season

1909 Mississippi A&M Aggies baseball

SIAA Co-Champion
- Conference: Southern Intercollegiate Athletic Association
- Record: 22–4 (10–2 SIAA)
- Head coach: Dolly Stark

The 1909 Mississippi A&M Aggies baseball team represented the Mississippi Aggies of Mississippi A&M in the 1909 IAAUS baseball season. The Aggies were led by Dolly Stark in his first and only season as head coach. They finished as co-champions of the SIAA with a 10–2 record, 22–4 overall.

== Schedule and results ==
Legend
Mississippi A&M win
Mississippi A&M loss
Tie

1909 Mississippi A&M Aggies baseball game log

Regular season
Date	Opponent	Site/stadium	Score	Overall record	SIAA record
	Jefferson Military Academy*	Starkville, MS	L 6–9	0–1	
	Jefferson Military Academy*	Starkville, MS	W 14–1	1–1	
	Jefferson Military Academy*	Starkville, MS	W 4–1	2–1	
	at Mississippi College*	Clinton, MS	W 6–2	3–1	
	at Mississippi College*	Clinton, MS	W 6–3	4–1	
	at Mississippi College*	Clinton, MS	L 2–8	4–2	
	at LSU	State Field • Baton Rouge, LA	L 0–3	4–3	0–1
	at LSU	State Field • Baton Rouge, LA	W 4–1	5–3	1–1
	at LSU	State Field • Baton Rouge, LA	W 1–0	6–3	2–1
	Howard*	Starkville, MS	W 9–1	7–3	
	Howard*	Starkville, MS	W 5–0	8–3	
	Howard*	Starkville, MS	W 7–1	9–3	
	at Southern Presbyterian*		W 3–0	10–3	
	at Southern Presbyterian*		W 11–2	11–3	
	at Southern Presbyterian*		W 4–0	12–3	
	at Cumberland	Lebanon, TN	L 0–1	12–4	2–2
	at Cumberland	Lebanon, TN	W 3–1	13–4	3–2
	at Cumberland	Lebanon, TN	W 2–1	14–4	4–2
	vs Nashville*	Columbus, MS	W 3–2	15–4	
	vs Nashville*	Columbus, MS	W 6–0	16–4	
	Cumberland	Starkville, MS	W 2–0	17–4	5–2
	Cumberland	Starkville, MS	W 5–0	18–4	6–2
	Cumberland	Starkville, MS	W 4–0	19–4	7–2
	Ole Miss	Starkville, MS	W 3–0	20–4	8–2
	Ole Miss	Starkville, MS	W 11–4	21–4	9–2
	Ole Miss	Starkville, MS	W 1–0	22–4	10–2
