= 1915 Alabama Crimson Tide baseball team =

American college baseball season

1915 Alabama Crimson Tide baseball

SIAA champion
- Conference: Southern Intercollegiate Athletic Association
- Record: 17–4–1 (11–4–1 SIAA)
- Head coach: D. V. Graves

The 1915 Alabama Crimson Tide baseball team represented the Alabama Crimson Tide of the University of Alabama in the 1915 NCAA baseball season, winning the SIAA championship.

== Schedule and results ==
Legend
Alabama win
Alabama loss
Tie

1915 Alabama Crimson Tide baseball game log

Regular season
Date	Opponent	Site/stadium	Score	Overall record	SIAA record
	Birmingham College		W 7–2	1–0	
	SWPU		W 2–0	2–0	
	Vanderbilt		W 5–2	3–0	
	Vanderbilt		L 6–12	3–1	
	Georgia Tech		W 2–1	4–1	
	Georgia Tech		L 6–7	4–2	
	Georgia		L 4–5	4–3	
	Georgia		W 3–0	5–3	
	Sewanee		W 4–2	6–3	
	Sewanee		W 5–1	7–3	
	Mississippi A&M		W 7–1	8–3	
	Mississippi A&M		W 2–1	9–3	
	LSU		W 10–4	10–3	
	LSU		W 9–2	11–3	
	Illinois		W 7–0	12–3	
	Millsaps		W 8–3	13–3	
	Millsaps		L 3–4	13–4	
	Mississippi College		W 4–3	14–4	
	Mississippi College		W 6–3	15–4	
	Southern		W 23–3	16–4	
	Cumberland		W 4–0	17–4	
	Cumberland		T 0–0	17–4–1	
