= 1909 Alabama Crimson Tide baseball team =

American college baseball season

1909 Alabama Crimson Tide baseball

SIAA champion
- Conference: Southern Intercollegiate Athletic Association
- Record: 19–3 (11–1 SIAA)
- Head coach: J. W. H. Pollard

The 1909 Alabama Crimson Tide baseball team represented the Alabama Crimson Tide of the University of Alabama in the 1909 IAAUS baseball season, winning the SIAA championship.

== Schedule and results ==
Legend
Alabama win
Alabama loss
Tie

1909 Alabama Crimson Tide baseball game log

Regular Season
Date	Opponent	Site/stadium	Score	Overall record	SIAA record
	Birmingham Barons		L 0–3	0–1	
	Howard		W 6–3	1–1	
	Howard		W 1–0	2–1	
	Howard		W 6–2	3–1	
	Chattanooga		W 14–2	4–1	
	Chattanooga		W 10–0	5–1	
	Chattanooga		W 7–0	6–1	
	Vanderbilt		W 5–4	7–1	
	Vanderbilt		W 2–1	8–1	
	Vanderbilt		W 4–3	9–1	
	Union		W 6–0	10–1	
	Union		W 8–2	11–1	
	Union		W 1–0	12–1	
	Georgia		W 3–2	13–1	
	Georgia		W 5–4	14–1	
	Georgia		W 5–4	15–1	
	Cumberland		L 0–2	15–2	
	Cumberland		W 2–0	16–2	
	Cumberland		W 6–1	17–2	
	Union		W 2–0	18–2	
	Union		L 4–5	18–3	
	Union		W 8–7	19–3	
