= 1910 Vanderbilt Commodores baseball team =

American college baseball season

1910 Vanderbilt Commodores baseball

SIAA champion
- Conference: Southern Intercollegiate Athletic Association
- Record: 12–6 (7–5 SIAA)
- Head coach: Ed Hamilton
- Captain: Richard Lyle
- Home stadium: Dudley Field

The 1910 Vanderbilt Commodores baseball team represented the Vanderbilt Commodores of the Vanderbilt University in the 1910 IAAUS baseball season, winning the SIAA championship. A game with St. Mary on April 27 was cancelled due to bad weather, as was a game with the Alumni on May 7, a second game with Michigan and one game with Sewanee.

== Roster ==
1910 Vanderbilt Commodores roster
Pitchers: - Coleman - pitcher; - C. H. Beasley - pitcher; - H. G. Jones - pitcher	Catchers: - Ray Morrison - catcher; - J. F. Champion - catcher; Infielders: - Ewing Y. Freeland - first base; - John Wilkes - second base; - J. R. Black - shortstop; - Richard Lyle - third base	Others: - Richard Rush; - Allen Brown; - Taylor; - Fred A. Robins; - Mahon

== Schedule and results ==
Legend
Vanderbilt win
Vanderbilt loss
Tie

1910 Vanderbilt Commodores baseball game log

Regular Season
Date	Opponent	Site/stadium	Score	Overall record	SIAA record
	SWPU		W 19–2	1–0	
	SWPU		W 6–2	2–0	
	SWPU		L 4–5	2–1	
April 9	Cumberland		W 10–8	3–1	
April 13	Cumberland	Dudley Field	W 4–0	4–1	
April 15	Michigan	Dudley Field	W 1–0	5–1	
	Georgia		W 4–2	6–1	
	Georgia		L 1–15	6–2	
	Georgia Tech		W 4–3	7–2	
	Georgia Tech		L 2–3	7–3	
May 5	Mississippi		W 4–1	8–3	
May 13	Tennessee	Dudley Field	L 3–4	8–4	
	Tennessee		W 7–5	9–4	
	Tennessee		W 5–2	10–4	
May 20	Sewanee		W 6–3	11–4	
	Sewanee		L 1–2	11–5	
	Sewanee		W 4–1	12–5	
	Sewanee		L 0–1	12–6	
