= 1913 Alabama Crimson Tide baseball team =

American college baseball season

1913 Alabama Crimson Tide baseball

SIAA champion
- Conference: Southern Intercollegiate Athletic Association
- Record: 22–7 (14–4 SIAA)
- Head coach: D. V. Graves

The 1913 Alabama Crimson Tide baseball team represented the Alabama Crimson Tide of the University of Alabama in the 1913 NCAA baseball season, winning the SIAA championship.

== Schedule and results ==
Legend
Alabama win
Alabama loss
Tie

1913 Alabama Crimson Tide baseball game log

Regular season
Date	Opponent	Site/stadium	Score	Overall record	SIAA record
	Cincinnati Reds		L 2–9	0–1	
	Illinois		L 1–2	0–2	
	Marion Institute		W 4–1	1–2	
	Marion Institute		W 5–0	2–2	
	Birmingham Barons		L 3–6	2–3	
	Birmingham Barons		L 3–5	2–4	
	Birmingham College		W 8–0	3–4	
	Birmingham College		W 4–0	4–4	
	Columbus		W 7–0	5–4	
	Tulane		W 1–0	6–4	
	Tulane		W 8–0	7–4	
	Mississippi A&M		W 5–4	8–4	
	Mississippi A&M		W 2–1	9–4	
	Georgia		L 2–4	9–5	
	Georgia		L 2–12	9–6	
	Mercer		W 2–0	10–6	
May 2	Mercer		W 3–0 (Note: Melford Pratt pitched a no-hitter)	11–6	
	Georgia Tech		W 7–3	12–6	
	Georgia Tech		W 5–4	13–6	
	Cumberland		W 15–1	14–6	
	Cumberland		W 5–4	15–6	
	Mississippi A&M		W 4–3	16–6	
	Mississippi A&M		W 7–6	17–6	
	Mississippi A&M		W 8–3	18–6	
	Texas Southwestern		W 8–4	19–6	
	Texas Southwestern		W 4–1	20–6	
	Vanderbilt		W 4–0	21–6	
	Vanderbilt		L 0–2	21–7	
	Vanderbilt		W 5–1	22–7	
