= 1903 Alabama Crimson Tide baseball team =

American college baseball season

1903 Alabama Crimson Tide baseball

SIAA champion
- Conference: Southern Intercollegiate Athletic Association
- Record: 16–3 (9–3 SIAA)
- Head coach: Thomas C. Stouch

The 1903 Alabama Crimson Tide baseball team represented the Alabama Crimson Tide of the University of Alabama in the 1903 college baseball season, winning the SIAA championship.

== Schedule and results ==
Legend
Alabama win
Alabama loss
Tie

1903 Alabama Crimson Tide baseball game log

Regular Season
Date	Opponent	Site/stadium	Score	Overall record	SIAA record
	Birmingham Barons*	Tuscaloosa, AL	W 9–4	1–0	
	Vanderbilt	Tuscaloosa, AL	W 9–4	2–0	1–0
	Vanderbilt	Tuscaloosa, AL	L 12–14	2–1	1–1
	Vanderbilt	Tuscaloosa, AL	W 9–8	3–1	2–1
	Greensboro*	Tuscaloosa, AL	W 13–4	4–1	
	Greensboro*	Tuscaloosa, AL	W 13–4	5–1	
	Greensboro*	Tuscaloosa, AL	W 13–6	6–1	
	at Tennessee	Waite Field • Knoxville, TN	W 6–5	7–1	3–1
	at Tennessee	Waite Field • Knoxville, TN	W 5–4	8–1	4–1
	at Tennessee	Waite Field • Knoxville, TN	L 13–19	8–2	4–2
	Sewanee	Tuscaloosa, AL	W 17–2	9–2	5–2
	Sewanee	Tuscaloosa, AL	W 21–0	10–2	6–2
	Sewanee	Tuscaloosa, AL	W 9–2	11–2	7–2
	vs Auburn	Selma, AL	L 5–6	11–3	7–3
	vs Auburn	Selma, AL	W 4–1	12–3	8–3
	vs Auburn	Selma, AL	W 5–4	13–3	9–3
	Kentucky State College*	Tuscaloosa, AL	W 3–0	14–3	
	Kentucky State College*	Tuscaloosa, AL	W 12–2	15–3	
	Kentucky State College*	Tuscaloosa, AL	W 10–0	16–3	
