= Texas Longhorns baseball, 1895–1899 =

American college baseball seasons

Texas Longhorns baseball represents the University of Texas in college baseball at the NCAA Division I level.

== 1897 ==
1897 Texas Longhorns baseball
- Conference: Southern Intercollegiate Athletic Association
- Record: Overall: 6–5; Collegiate: 3–0 (0–0 SIAA)
- Head coach: F. Weikart (1st season)
- Captain: J.S. Jones
- Home stadium: Varsity Athletic Field

The 1897 Texas Longhorns baseball team represented the Texas Longhorns baseball program for the University of Texas in the 1897 college baseball season. F. Weikart coached the team in his 1st season at Texas.

=== Schedule ===
1897 Texas Longhorns baseball game log
Legend: = Win = Loss

Regular season (6–5)
Date	Opponent	Stadium	Score	Overall record	Collegiate Record
March 13	Tenth Ward^{#}	Varsity Athletic Field • Austin, TX	L 5–7	0–1	
March 26	Austin YMCA^{#}	Varsity Athletic Field • Austin, TX	W 13–4	1–1	
March 27	Texas School for the Deaf^{#}	Varsity Athletic Field • Austin, TX	W 10–2	2–1	
April 3	Austin Senators^{#}	Austin, TX	L 10–26	2–2	
April 10	Austin Senators^{#}	Austin, TX	L 6–22	2–3	
April 21	at Add Ran*	Waco, TX	W 13–6	3–3	1–0
May 3	at Bastrop^{#}	Bastrop, TX	L 6–13	3–4	
May 4	at Bastrop^{#}	Bastrop, TX	L 4–7	3–5	
May 25	Add Ran*	Varsity Athletic Field • Austin, TX	W 25–7	4–5	2–0
May 26	Add Ran*	Varsity Athletic Field • Austin, TX	W 19–9	5–5	3–0
May 27	Austin YMCA^{#}	Varsity Athletic Field • Austin, TX	W 21–5	6–5	

* indicates a non-conference game. ^{#} indicates a non-collegiate game. All rankings from D1Baseball on the date of the contest.

== 1898 ==
1898 Texas Longhorns baseball
- Conference: Southern Intercollegiate Athletic Association
- Record: Overall: 1–4; Collegiate: 1–0 (0–0 SIAA)
- Head coach: A. C. Ellis (1st season)
- Captain: Charles Batsell
- Home stadium: Varsity Athletic Field

The 1898 Texas Longhorns baseball team represented the Texas Longhorns baseball program for the University of Texas in the 1898 college baseball season. A. C. Ellis coached the team in his 1st season at Texas.

=== Schedule ===
1898 Texas Longhorns baseball game log
Legend: = Win = Loss

Regular season (1–4)
Date	Opponent	Stadium	Score	Overall record	Collegiate Record
March 10	Austin Senators^{#}	Austin, TX	L 11–19	0–1	—
March 17	St. Edward's*	Varsity Athletic Field • Austin, TX	W 20–5	1–1	1–0
April 2	at San Antonio^{#}	San Antonio, TX	L 0–10	1–2	—
April 6	Austin Senators^{#}	Austin, TX	L 4–16	1–3	—
April 21	Galveston Beach Club^{#}	Varsity Athletic Field • Austin, TX	L 1–2	1–4	—

* indicates a non-conference game. ^{#} indicates a non-collegiate game. All rankings from D1Baseball on the date of the contest.

== 1899 ==
1899 Texas Longhorns baseball
- Conference: Southern Intercollegiate Athletic Association
- Record: Overall: 11–1–1; Collegiate: 8–0–1 (8–0–1 SIAA)
- Head coach: A. C. Ellis (2nd season)
- Captain: C.H. Palm
- Home stadium: Varsity Athletic Field

The 1899 Texas Longhorns baseball team represented the Texas Longhorns baseball team of the University of Texas in the 1899 college baseball season. A. C. Ellis led his second and final season as coach.

=== Personnel ===
==== Players ====
1899 Texas Longhorns roster
Pitchers Catchers Infielders Outfielders Utility	Unknown Position: - Wilbur Price Allen; - H. W. Carothers; - Will T. Decherd; - John S. Douglass; - Walter W. Fisher; - William Henry Flippen; - W. N. Friend; - R. F. Lamberton; - O. H. Palm; - Arthur James Rector; - James Taylor; - John R. Wilbanks; - Patrick Henry Winston

==== Staff ====
1899 Texas Longhorns staff
- A. C. Ellis - coach

=== Schedule and results ===
1899 Texas Longhorns baseball game log
Legend: = Win = Loss = Tie
Regular season (11–1–1)

March/April (8–0–1
Date	Opponent	Stadium	Score	Overall record	Collegiate Record	SIAA record
March 25	Austin YMCA^{#}	Varsity Athletic Field • Austin, TX	W 9–3	1–0	—	—
April 1	Austin YMCA^{#}	Varsity Athletic Field • Austin, TX	W 21–0	2–0	—	—
April 8	at Austin Senators^{#}	Riverside Park • Austin, TX	W 12–3	3–0	—	—
April 14	LSU	Varsity Athletic Field • Austin, TX	W 8–6	4–0	1–0	1–0
April 15	at Tulane	Tulane Diamond • New Orleans, LA	T 3–3 ^{12}	4–0–1	1–0–1	1–0–1
April 17	at Alabama	Tuscaloosa, AL	W 9–3	5–0–1	2–0–1	2–0–1
April 18	at Alabama	Tuscaloosa, AL	W 10–1	6–0–1	3–0–1	3–0–1
April 19	at Alabama	Tuscaloosa, AL	W 4–2	7–0–1	4–0–1	4–0–1
April 22	at Tulane	Tulane Diamond • New Orleans, LA	W 12–1	8–0–1	5–0–1	5–0–1

May (3–1)
Date	Opponent	Stadium	Score	Overall record	Collegiate Record	SIAA record
May 4	LSU	Varsity Athletic Field • Austin, TX	W 3–0	9–0–1	6–0–1	6–0–1
May 5	LSU	Varsity Athletic Field • Austin, TX	W 5–4	10–0–1	7–0–1	7–0–1
May 6	LSU	Varsity Athletic Field • Austin, TX	W 4–1	11–0–1	8–0–1	8–0–1
May 13	at Austin Senators^{#}	Riverside Park • Austin, TX	L 0–12	11–1–1	—	—

* indicates a non-conference game. ^{#} indicates a non-collegiate game. All rankings from D1Baseball on the date of the contest.
