= 1919 Georgia Bulldogs baseball team =

American college baseball season

1919 Georgia Bulldogs baseball

SIAA Co-Champion
- Conference: Southern Intercollegiate Athletic Association
- Record: 16–4–2 (16–3–2 SIAA)
- Head coach: Herman Stegeman
- Home stadium: Sanford Field

The 1919 Georgia Bulldogs baseball team represented the Georgia Bulldogs of the University of Georgia in the 1919 NCAA baseball season.

== Schedule and results ==
Legend
Georgia win
Georgia loss
Tie

One game (a loss) not accounted for in Media Guide.

1919 Georgia Bulldogs baseball game log

Regular Season
Date	Opponent	Site/stadium	Score	Overall record	SIAA record
	Oglethorpe		W 10–0	1–0	
	Oglethorpe		W 2–1	2–0	
	Mercer		W 9–0	3–0	
	Mercer		L 0–2	3–1	
	Clemson		W 7–6	4–1	
	Clemson		T 2–2^{11}	4–1–1	
	Clemson		W 1–0	5–1–1	
	Clemson		W 4–3	6–1–1	
	Virginia		W 5–4	7–1–1	
	Virginia		L 0–3	7–2–1	
	Virginia		W 7–2	8–2–1	
	Virginia		W 3–2	9–2–1	
	Auburn		W 5–4	10–2–1	
	Auburn		T 0–0	10–2–2	
	Auburn		L 0–1	10–3–2	
	Auburn		W 9–5	11–3–2	
	Alabama		W 6–1	12–3–2	
	Georgia Tech		W 2–1	13–3–2	
	Georgia Tech		W 8–0	14–3–2	
	Georgia Tech		W 7–5	15–3–2	
	Georgia Tech		W 5–2	16–3–2	
