= 1896 college baseball season =

Seasons
- ← 1895 1897 →

The 1896 college baseball season, play of college baseball in the United States began in the spring of 1896. Play largely consisted of regional matchups, some organized by conferences, and ended in June. No national championship event was held until 1947.

== Conference changes and new programs ==
- The Western Conference played its first season of baseball, with Chicago, Illinois, Michigan, and Wisconsin participating.
- Central Michigan, Clemson, Indiana State, Kentucky, Marshall, UConn, and Wisconsin played their first varsity seasons.

== Conference winners ==
This is a partial list of conference champions from the 1896 season.

Conference	Regular season winner
Western	Chicago

== Conference standings ==
The following is an incomplete list of conference standings:

1896 Western Conference baseball standings
	Conf.				Overall
Team	W		L	PCT	W		L	PCT
Chicago ‍†‍‍	6	–	2	.750		–		–
Michigan ‍‍‍	6	–	3	.667		–		–
Illinois ‍‍‍	2	–	4	.333		–		–
Wisconsin ‍‍‍	0	–	5	.000		–		–
† – Conference champion
