= 1905 Texas Longhorns baseball team =

American college baseball season

1905 Texas Longhorns baseball

SIAA champion
- Conference: Southern Intercollegiate Athletic Association
- Record: 17–8 (? SIAA)
- Head coach: Ralph Hutchinson
- Home stadium: Clark Field

The 1905 Texas Longhorns baseball team represented the Texas Longhorns baseball team of the University of Texas in the 1905 college baseball season.

== Schedule and results ==
Legend
Texas win
Texas loss
Tie

1905 Texas Longhorns baseball game log
Regular season

March
Date	Opponent	Site/stadium	Score	Overall record	SWIAA record
Mar 24	St. Edward's	Clark Field • Austin, TX	L 7–11	0–1	
Mar 28	St. Edward's	Clark Field • Austin, TX	W 11–2	1–1	
Mar 31	Austin Senators*	Clark Field • Austin, TX	W 4–1	2–1	

April
Date	Opponent	Site/stadium	Score	Overall record	SWIAA record
Apr 1	Austin Senators*	Clark Field • Austin, TX	W 2–1	3–1	
Apr 7	Austin Senators*	Clark Field • Austin, TX	L 1–2	3–2	
Apr 8	Austin Senators*	Clark Field • Austin, TX	W 5–3	4–2	
Apr 12	St. Edward's	Clark Field • Austin, TX	L 1–2	4–3	
Apr 14	at Texas A&M	Kyle Baseball Field • College Station, TX	W 5–4	5–3	
Apr 15	at Texas A&M	Kyle Baseball Field • College Station, TX	W 14–7	6–3	
Apr 17	Southwestern	Clark Field • Austin, TX	W 10–1	7–3	
Apr 19	Texas School for the Deaf*	Clark Field • Austin, TX	W 2–0	8–3	
Apr 26	Beaumont Millionaires*	Clark Field • Austin, TX	L 0–2	8–4	
Apr 27	Beaumont Millionaires*	Clark Field • Austin, TX	L 0–1	8–5	
Apr 28	Baylor	Clark Field • Austin, TX	W 5–1	9–5	

May
Date	Opponent	Site/stadium	Score	Overall record	SWIAA record
May 1	at Southwestern	Georgetown, TX	W 4–0	10–5	
May 3	Missouri*	Clark Field • Austin, TX	W 6–0	11–5	
May 4	Missouri*	Clark Field • Austin, TX	L 2–7	11–6	
May 5	Texas A&M	Clark Field • Austin, TX	L 0–1	11–7	
May 8	St. Edward's	Clark Field • Austin, TX	W 1–0	12–7	
May 11	St. Edward's	Clark Field • Austin, TX	W 2–0	13–7	
May 16	at Vanderbilt*	Old Dudley Field • Nashville, TN	W 3–2	14–7	
May 17	at Vanderbilt*	Old Dudley Field • Nashville, TN	L 2–6	14–8	
May 18	at Ole Miss*	Oxford, MS	W 3–2	15–8	
May 19	at Ole Miss*	Oxford, MS	W 5–1	16–8	
May 20	at Ole Miss*	Oxford, MS	W 5–0	17–8	
