= 1899 Michigan Wolverines baseball team =

American college baseball season

1899 Michigan Wolverines baseball

Western Conference champion
- Conference: Western Conference
- Record: 14–5 (5–2 Western)
- Head coach: Henry Clarke
- Home stadium: Regents Field

1899 Western Conference baseball standings
	Conf.				Overall
Team	W		L	PCT	W		L	PCT
Michigan ‍†‍‍	5	–	2	.714	14	–	5	.737
Illinois ‍‍‍	9	–	4	.692	11	–	6	.647
Chicago ‍‍‍	6	–	4	.600	18	–	8	.692
Northwestern ‍‍‍	2	–	6	.250	8	–	7	.533
Wisconsin ‍‍‍	2	–	8	.200	5	–	16	.238
† – Conference champion

The 1899 Michigan Wolverines baseball team represented the University of Michigan in the 1899 college baseball season. The Wolverines were led by head coach Henry Clarke. They won the Western Conference for the first time with a record of 5–2, 14–5 overall.

== Personnel ==
=== Roster ===
1899 Michigan Wolverines roster
Pitchers Catchers	Infielders	Outfielders	Position Unknown: - Frank Condon; - Marion Flesher; - Ernest Lunn; - David Matteson; - Harry McGee; - Edwin McGinnis; - Guy Miller; - Muir Snow; - Neil Snow

=== Staff ===
1899 Michigan Wolverines staff
- Henry Clarke - Coach; - Harold Emmonds Sr. - Manager

== Schedule and results ==
Legend
Michigan win
Michigan loss
Tie

1899 Michigan Wolverines baseball game log
Regular season

April
Date	Opponent	Site/stadium	Score	Overall record	Conference record
Apr 19	Beloit*		W 4–3	1–0	
Apr 20	Wisconsin		L 4–6	1–1	0–1
Apr 21	Wisconsin		W 21–1	2–1	1–1
Apr 22	Notre Dame*		W 5–3	3–1	
Apr 29	Illinois		L 3–7	3–2	1–2

May
Date	Opponent	Site/stadium	Score	Overall record	Conference record
May 3	Indiana*		W 9–0	4–2	
May 6	Ohio State*		W 7–3	5–2	
May 10	Illinois		W 2–1	6–2	2–2
May 16	Albion*		W 6–2	7–2	
May 18	Illinois		W 4–3	8–2	3–2
May 18	Illinois		W 4–2	9–2	4–2
May 30	Wisconsin		W 6–1	10–2	5–2

June
Date	Opponent	Site/stadium	Score	Overall record	Conference record
June 1	Beloit		L 3–4	10–3	
June 3	Cornell*		W 8–7	11–3	
June 5	Lafayette*		L 2–4	11–4	
June 6	Penn*		W 4–1	12–4	
June 10	Notre Dame*		W 7–1	13–4	
June 16	Cornell*		W 10–7	14–4	
June 17	Cornell*		L 5–10	14–5	
