= 1901 Texas Longhorns baseball team =

American college baseball season

1901 Texas Longhorns baseball
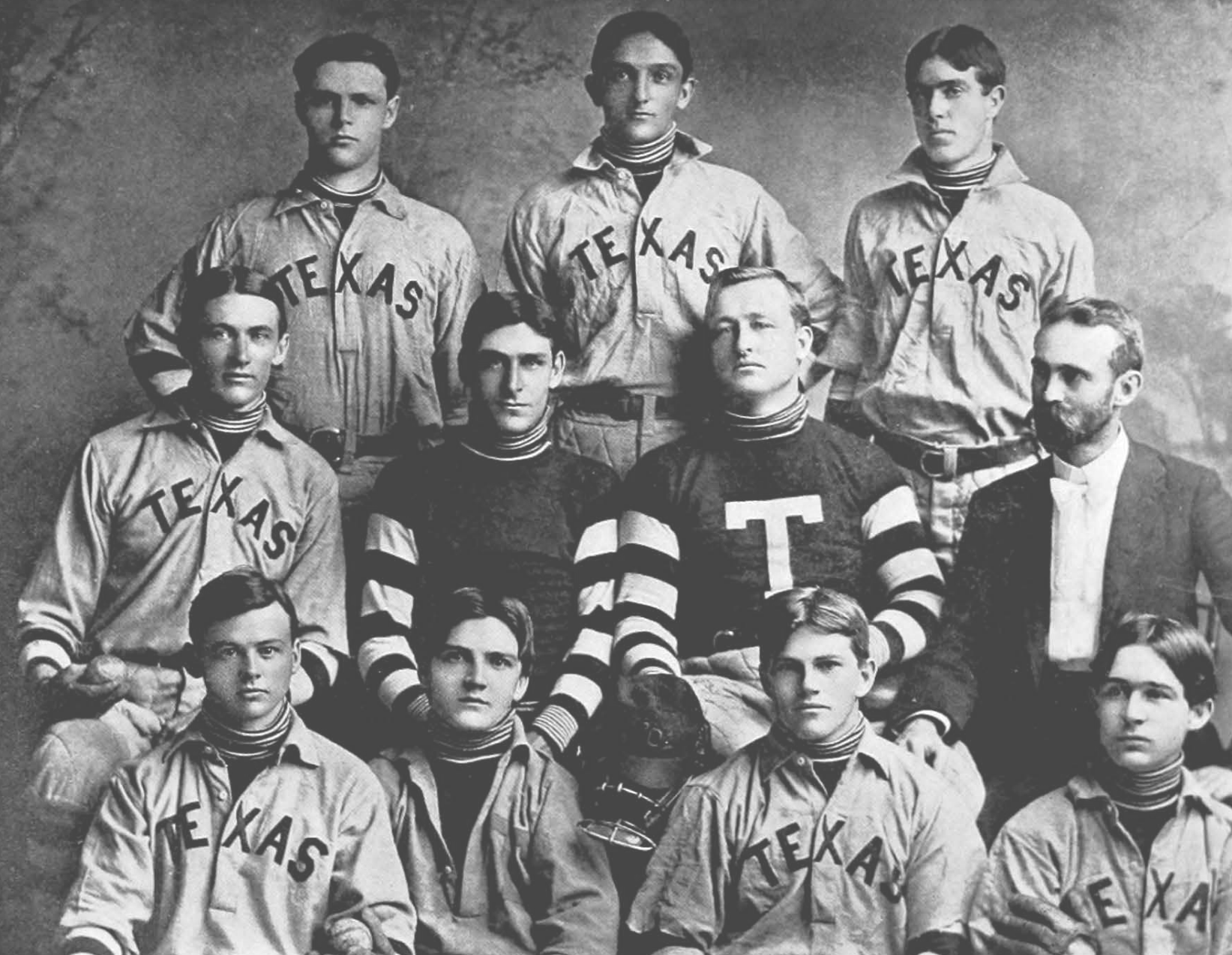
- Conference: Southern Intercollegiate Athletic Association
- Record: Overall: 11–2; Collegiate: 10–2 (3-2 SIAA)
- Head coach: Alexander C. Ellis (3rd season)
- Captain: Samuel F. Leslie
- Home stadium: Varsity Athletic Field

The 1901 Texas Longhorns baseball team represented the Texas Longhorns baseball program for the University of Texas in the 1901 college baseball season. In his 3rd nonconsecutive season Professor Alexander Caswell Ellis coached the team to a 11-2 record overall and 3-2 in the SIAA.

The team notably did not include any of the previous season's starting lineup as they were dismissed from the team by UT president William Prather the previous year for the use of an ineligible player during a game against Jefferson College. Despite being made up of second-stringers the team defied expectations and dominated opponents, which included a rematch series against Jefferson. They only dropped two games, and outscored opponents by a combined 121-45 points.

== Schedule ==
1901 Texas Longhorns baseball game log
Legend: = Win = Loss = Tie

Regular season (11–2)
Date	Opponent	Stadium	Score	Overall record	Collegiate Record	SIAA record
March 30	St. Edward's*	Varsity Athletic Field • Austin, TX	W 11–2	1–0	1–0	—
April 6	Texas School for the Deaf^{#}	Varsity Athletic Field • Austin, TX	W 8–1	2–0	—	—
April 18	Fort Worth University*	Varsity Athletic Field • Austin, TX	W 32–2	3–0	2-0	—
April 21	Southwestern*	Varsity Athletic Field • Austin, TX	W 6–3	4–0	3-0	—
April 29	at LSU	State Field • Baton Rouge, LA	L 1–2	4–1	3–1	0-1
April 30	at Jefferson Military*	Washington, MS	W 13–8	5–1	4–1	—
May 1	at Jefferson Military*	Washington, MS	W 4–1	6–1	5–1	—
May 2	at LSU	State Field • Baton Rouge, LA	W 6–1	7–1	6–1	1-1
May 4	at Tulane	Tulane Diamond • New Orleans, LA	W 13–5	8-1	7–1	2–1
May 6	at Ole Miss	Oxford, MS	W 9–6	9–1	8–1	3–1
May 9	at Ole Miss	Oxford, MS	L 3–4	9–2	8–2	3-2
May 11	Weatherford College*	Varsity Athletic Field • Austin, TX	W 9–5	10–2	9–2	—
May 13	at Southwestern*	Georgetown, TX	W 6–5	11–2	10-2	—

* indicates a non-conference game. ^{#} indicates a non-collegiate game. All rankings from D1Baseball on the date of the contest.
