= 1919 Alabama Crimson Tide baseball team =

American college baseball season

1919 Alabama Crimson Tide baseball

SIAA champion
- Conference: Southern Intercollegiate Athletic Association
- Record: 16–2 (15–1 SIAA)
- Head coach: Loonie Hoojin

The 1919 Alabama Crimson Tide baseball team represented the Alabama Crimson Tide of the University of Alabama in the 1919 NCAA baseball season, winning the SIAA championship.

== Schedule and results ==
Legend
Alabama win
Alabama loss
Tie

1919 Alabama Crimson Tide baseball game log

Regular season
Date	Opponent	Site/stadium	Score	Overall record	SIAA record
	Howard		W 7–1	1–0	
	Howard		W 7–5	2–0	
	Birmingham Barons*		W 3–0	3–0	
	Vanderbilt		W 9–2	4–0	
	Birmingham Barons*		L 1–8	4–1	
	Howard		W 8–5	5–1	
	Oglethorpe		W 5–2	6–1	
	Oglethorpe		W 6–2	7–1	
	Georgia		W 6–1	8–1	
	Clemson		W 8–2	9–1	
	Clemson		L 3–4	9–2	
	Furman		W 8–0	10–2	
	Mississippi A&M		W 5–3	11–2	
	Mississippi A&M		W 14–4	12–2	
	Georgia Tech		W 11–1	13–2	
	Georgia Tech		W 6–2	14–2	
	LSU		W 2–1^{10}	15–2	
	LSU		W 9–0	16–2	
