= 1920 Alabama Crimson Tide baseball team =

American college baseball season

1920 Alabama Crimson Tide baseball

SIAA champion
- Conference: Southern Intercollegiate Athletic Association
- Record: 15–2 (12–1 SIAA)
- Head coach: Gordon Lewis

The 1920 Alabama Crimson Tide baseball team represented the Alabama Crimson Tide of the University of Alabama in the 1920 NCAA baseball season, winning the SIAA championship. The team featured Ike Boone and Riggs Stephenson and Ernie Wingard.

== Schedule and results ==
Legend
Alabama win
Alabama loss
Tie

1920 Alabama Crimson Tide baseball game log

Regular season
Date	Opponent	Site/stadium	Score	Overall record	SIAA record
	Southern Military Academy*		W 15–3	1–0	
	Southern Military Academy*		W 4–0	2–0	
	Illinois*		W 5–1	3–0	
	Birmingham Barons*		L 0–6	3–1	
	Florida		W 13–4	4–1	
	Florida		W 9–3	5–1	
	Howard		W 5–3	6–1	
	Howard		W 6–1	7–1	
	at Mississippi A&M	Starkville, MS	L 1–4	7–2	
	at Mississippi A&M	Starkville, MS	W 3–2	8–2	
	at LSU	State Field • Baton Rouge, LA	W 6–1	9–2	
	at LSU	State Field • Baton Rouge, LA	W 5–4	10–2	
	Oglethorpe		W 5–0	11–2	
	LSU		W 4–0	12–2	
	LSU		W 5–4	13–2	
	Mercer		W 1–0	14–2	
	Mercer		W 3–1	15–2	
