= 1921 Georgia Tech Golden Tornado baseball team =

American college baseball season

1921 Georgia Tech Yellow Jackets baseball

SIAA co-champion
- Conference: Southern Intercollegiate Athletic Association
- Record: 18–4–1 (11–1 SIAA)
- Head coach: Kid Clay
- Home stadium: Grant Field

The 1921 Georgia Tech Golden Tornado baseball team represented the Georgia Tech Golden Tornado of the Georgia Institute of Technology in the 1921 NCAA baseball season, winning the SIAA championship. Red Barron was on the team.

== Schedule and results ==
Legend
Georgia Tech win
Georgia Tech loss
Tie

1921 Georgia Tech Yellow Jackets baseball game log

Regular season
Date	Opponent	Site/stadium	Score	Overall record	SIAA record
March 25	Cincinnati		W 18–0	1–0	
March 26	Cincinnati		W 17–5	2–0	
April 1	Clemson		W 7–0	3–0	
April 2	Clemson		W 10–1	4–0	
April 8	Oglethorpe		L 3–6	4–1	
April 9	Oglethorpe		W 9–3	5–1	
April 15	Auburn		W 8–3	6–1	
April 19	Harvard		W 7–6	7–1	
April 22	NC State		W 7–2	8–1	
April 23	NC State		W 6–0	9–1	
April 25	Georgetown		L 1–8	9–2	
April 26	Georgetown		W 3–2	10–2	
April 27	Navy		T 2–2	10–2–1	
April 28	Maryland		L 3–6	10–3–1	
April 29	Washington & Lee		W 2–0	11–3–1	
April 30	Washington & Lee		W 6–3	12–3–1	
May 6	NC State		W 10–0	13–3–1	
May 7	NC State		L 1–4	13–4–1	
May 13	Washington & Lee		W 4–1	14–4–1	
May 14	Washington & Lee		W 8–4	15–4–1	
May 18	Oglethorpe		W 5–0	16–4–1	
May 20	Tennessee		W 4–1	17–4–1	
May 21	Tennessee		W 4–3	18–4–1	
