= 1899 college baseball season =

Seasons
- ← 1898 1900 →

The 1899 college baseball season, play of college baseball in the United States began in the spring of 1899. Play largely consisted of regional matchups, some organized by conferences, and ended in June. No national championship event was held until 1947.

== New programs ==
- The Citadel played its first varsity season.

== Conference winners ==
This is a partial list of conference champions from the 1899 season.

Conference	Regular season winner
SIAA	Sewanee/Texas
Western	Michigan

== Conference standings ==
The following is an incomplete list of conference standings:

1899 Western Conference baseball standings
	Conf.				Overall
Team	W		L	PCT	W		L	PCT
Michigan ‍†‍‍	5	–	2	.714	14	–	5	.737
Illinois ‍‍‍	9	–	4	.692	11	–	6	.647
Chicago ‍‍‍	6	–	4	.600	18	–	8	.692
Northwestern ‍‍‍	2	–	6	.250	8	–	7	.533
Wisconsin ‍‍‍	2	–	8	.200	5	–	16	.238
† – Conference champion
