= 1984 Southwest Conference baseball tournament =

- Teams: 4
- Format: Double-elimination tournament
- Finals site: Disch–Falk Field; Austin, Texas
- Champions: Texas (6th title)
- Winning coach: Cliff Gustafson (6th title)

1984 Southwest Conference baseball standings
	Conf.				Overall
Team	W		L	PCT	W		L	PCT
No. 2 Texas ‍†‍‡‍^{y}	16	–	5	.762	60	–	14	.811
Rice ‍‍‍	13	–	8	.619	41	–	14	.745
No. 19 Texas A&M ‍‍‍^{y}	13	–	8	.619	41	–	21	.661
Arkansas ‍‍‍	12	–	9	.571	40	–	16	.714
Baylor ‍‍‍	9	–	12	.429	26	–	23	.531
Texas Tech ‍‍‍	9	–	12	.429	33	–	22	.600
Houston ‍‍‍	6	–	15	.286	32	–	33	.492
TCU ‍‍‍	6	–	15	.286	25	–	22	.532
† – Conference champion ‡ – Tournament champion y – Invited to the NCAA tournament As of June 30, 1984; Rankings from Collegiate Baseball

The 1984 Southwest Conference baseball tournament was the league's annual postseason tournament used to determine the Southwest Conference's (SWC) automatic bid to the 1984 NCAA Division I baseball tournament. The tournament was held from May 11 through 13 at Disch–Falk Field on the campus of The University of Texas in Austin, Texas.

The number 1 seed Texas Longhorns went 3–0 to win the team's 6th SWC tournament under head coach Cliff Gustafson.

== Format and seeding ==
The tournament featured the top four finishers of the SWC's 8 teams in a double-elimination tournament.

Place	Team	Conference				Overall			Seed
Place	Team	W	L	%	GB	W	L	%	Seed
1	Texas	16	5	.762	-	60	14	.811	1
2	Rice	13	8	.619	3	41	14	.745	2
3	Texas A&M	13	8	.619	3	41	21	.661	3
4	Arkansas	12	9	.571	4	40	16	.714	4
5	Baylor	9	12	.429	7	26	23	.531	-
6	Texas Tech	9	12	.429	7	33	22	.600	-
7	Houston	6	15	.286	10	32	23	.582	-
8	TCU	6	15	.286	10	25	22	.532	-

== Tournament ==
Upper round 1
1	Texas	8
4	Arkansas	1
2	Rice	2
3	Texas A&M	6
Lower round 1
4	Arkansas	1
2	Rice	8

Upper final
1	Texas	15
3	Texas A&M	4
Lower final
3	Texas A&M	6
2	Rice	5

Final
1	Texas	9	–
3	Texas A&M	5	–
