= 1897 college baseball season =

Seasons
- ← 1896 1898 →

The 1897 college baseball season, play of college baseball in the United States began in the spring of 1897. Play largely consisted of regional matchups, some organized by conferences, and ended in June. No national championship event was held until 1947.

== New programs ==
- Arkansas, Kansas State, and Tennessee played their first varsity seasons.

== Conference standings ==
The following is an incomplete list of conference standings:

1897 Western Conference baseball standings
	Conf.				Overall
Team	W		L	PCT	W		L	PCT
Chicago ‍†‍‍	6	–	2	.750		–		–
Illinois ‍‍‍	3	–	3	.500		–		–
Wisconsin ‍‍‍	3	–	3	.500		–		–
Michigan ‍‍‍	2	–	4	.333		–		–
† – Conference champion

== Conference winners ==
This is a partial list of conference champions from the 1897 season.

Conference	Regular season winner
Western	Chicago
