= 1921 NCAA baseball season =

American college baseball season

Seasons
- ← 1920 1922 →

The 1921 NCAA baseball season, play of college baseball in the United States organized by the National Collegiate Athletic Association (NCAA) began in the spring of 1921. Play largely consisted of regional matchups, some organized by conferences, and ended in June. No national championship event was held until 1947.

== Conference winners ==
This is a partial list of conference champions from the 1921 season.

Conference	Regular season winner
Big Nine	Illinois
Missouri Valley	Kansas
Pacific Coast Conference	California
SIAA	Georgia Tech / Vanderbilt
Southwest Conference	Texas
