= 1901 North Carolina Tar Heels baseball team =

American college baseball season

1901 North Carolina Tar Heels baseball

SIAA Champion
- Conference: Southern Intercollegiate Athletic Association
- Record: 11–4–2 (6–0–1 SIAA)
- Head coach: Ernest Graves Sr.

The 1901 North Carolina Tar Heels baseball team represented the University of North Carolina at Chapel Hill in the 1901 college baseball season. The following year, the Tar Heels were suspended from the league for allegedly fielding two professional players in collegiate games.

== Schedule ==
Legend
	North Carolina win
	North Carolina loss
	Tie
*	Non-Conference game

1901 North Carolina Tar Heels baseball game log
Regular season

Date	Opponent	Site/stadium	Score	Overall record	SIAA record
	Lafayette*		T 2–2	0–0–1	
	Lafayette*		W 4–3	1–0–1	
	North Carolina A&M*		W 31–3	2–0–1	
	Clemson		W 14–0	3–0–1	1–0
	Clemson		T 2–2	3–0–2	1–0–1
	Lehigh*		W 13–2	4–0–2	
	Lehigh*		L 2–13	4–1–2	
	Cornell*		W 10–9	5–1–2	
	Georgia		W 12–4	6–1–2	2–0–1
	Georgia		W 10–0	7–1–2	3–0–1
	Virginia*		L 2–9	7–2–2	
	Maryland*		W 19–7	8–2–2	
	Maryland*		L 8–9	8–3–2	
	Georgia		W 10–1	9–3–2	4–0–1
	Georgia Tech		W 6–0	10–3–2	5–0–1
	Georgia		W 40–4	11–3–2	6–0–1
	Raleigh*		L 6–11	11–4–2	
