= 1914 Georgia Bulldogs baseball team =

American college baseball season

1914 Georgia Bulldogs baseball

SIAA Champion
- Conference: Southern Intercollegiate Athletic Association
- Record: 19–6 ( SIAA)
- Head coach: Joe Bean
- Home stadium: Sanford Field

The 1914 Georgia Bulldogs baseball team represented the Georgia Bulldogs of the University of Georgia in the 1914 NCAA baseball season, winning the SIAA championship.
