= 1917 Alabama Crimson Tide baseball team =

American college baseball season

1917 Alabama Crimson Tide baseball

SIAA champion
- Conference: Southern Intercollegiate Athletic Association
- Record: 14–2 (11–1 SIAA)
- Head coach: Loonie Hoojin

The 1917 Alabama Crimson Tide baseball team represented the Alabama Crimson Tide of the University of Alabama in the 1917 NCAA baseball season, winning the SIAA championship.

== Schedule and results ==
Legend
Alabama win
Alabama loss
Tie

1917 Alabama Crimson Tide baseball game log

Regular Season
Date	Opponent	Site/stadium	Score	Overall record	SIAA record
	Birmingham Barons		L 3–5	0–1	
	Howard		W 6–5	1–1	
	Howard		W 4–3	2–1	
	Mississippi A&M		W 9–2	3–1	
	Mississippi A&M		W 9–1	4–1	
	Birmingham College		W 2–1	5–1	
	LSU		W 12–2	6–1	
	LSU		W 12–3	7–1	
	Sewanee		W 3–1	8–1	
	Sewanee		W 5–0	9–1	
	Mississippi		W 5–3	10–1	
	Mississippi		W 7–0	11–1	
	Tennessee		L 8–9	11–2	
May 3	Tennessee		W 3–0 (Note: Merrit Wikle threw a no-hitter.)	12–2	
	Springhill (OH)		W 1–0	13–2	
	Springhill		W 2–1	14–2	
