= 1908 Georgia Bulldogs baseball team =

American college baseball season

1908 Georgia Bulldogs baseball

SIAA Champion
- Conference: Southern Intercollegiate Athletic Association
- Record: 20–2 (11–0 SIAA)
- Head coach: Hammond Johnson
- Captain: Frank Martin
- Home stadium: Herty Field

The 1908 Georgia Bulldogs baseball team represented the Georgia Bulldogs of the University of Georgia in the 1908 IAAUS baseball season, winning the SIAA championship.

== Roster ==
1908 Georgia Bulldogs roster
- Clyde Barnett; - Brian Bocock; - Hugh Bostwick; - Carlysle Cobb; - Glen Colby; - C. H. Cox; - Claud Derrick; - Frank Foley; - Richard Graves	- Harry Harmon; - Morton Hodgson; - James Lucas; - Frank Martin; - Erle Newsome; - William Oglesby; - Jim Redfearn; - Fred Rogers; - Jim Watson

== Schedule and results ==
Legend
Georgia win
Georgia loss
Tie

1908 Georgia Bulldogs baseball game log

Regular Season
Date	Opponent	Site/stadium	Score	Overall record	SIAA record
	Gordon		W 5–0	1–0	
	NY Americans		L 1–4	1–1	
	Augusta		L 0–10	1–2	
	Stone Mountain		W 7–0	2–2	
	Newberry		W 11–1	3–2	
	Newberry		W 11–0	4–2	
	Alabama		W 9–4	5–2	
	Alabama		W 8–3	6–2	
	Alabama		W 17–0	7–2	
	Trinity		W 3–2	8–2	
	Trinity		W 2–0	9–2	
	Sewanee		W 4–2	10–2	
	Spartanburg		W 9–4	11–2	
	Clemson		W 8–0	12–2	
	Clemson		W 7–0	13–2	
	Clemson		W 6–0	14–2	
	Central		W 10–0	15–2	
	Central		W 16–0	16–2	
	Mercer		W 5–0	17–2	
	Mercer		W 5–1	18–2	
	Washington and Lee		W 3–1	19–2	
	Washington and Lee		W 4–0	20–2	
