= Grayson Garvin =

American baseball player (born 1989)

- Pitcher
- Born: October 27, 1989 (age 36); Suwanee, Georgia, U.S.
- Bats: Left Throws: Left
- Stats at Baseball Reference

Grayson O'Neil Garvin (born October 27, 1989) is an American former professional baseball pitcher. He was drafted by the Tampa Bay Rays in the first round of the 2011 MLB draft. Despite spending time on Tampa Bay's 40-man roster, he never played in Major League Baseball (MLB).

== Career ==
=== Amateur ===
Garvin attended Wesleyan School in Norcross, Georgia. He was drafted by the Houston Astros in the 45th round of the 2008 Major League Baseball draft, but did not sign and played college baseball at Vanderbilt University. Garvin was mostly a relief pitcher in his first two seasons at Vanderbilt. In 2009, he played collegiate summer baseball for the Falmouth Commodores of the Cape Cod Baseball League, and returned to the league in 2010 with the Bourne Braves, where he won the league's Outstanding Pitcher award. As a junior in 2011, he became a full-time starter, going 13–2 with a 2.48 earned run average (ERA) and 101 strikeouts in 18 starts. For his play he was named the SEC Pitcher of the Year.

=== Tampa Bay Rays ===
Garvin was drafted by the Tampa Bay Rays in the first round of the 2011 Major League Baseball draft. He signed with the Rays and made his professional debut in 2012 with the High-A Charlotte Stone Crabs. He pitched in 11 games (ten starts) in which he compiled a 2-4 record and a 5.05 ERA before suffering an injury that required Tommy John surgery, thus ending his season.

Garvin returned in 2013 to start 11 games for the rookie-level Gulf Coast League Rays and Charlotte. In those 11 starts, he was 0-2 with a 1.59 ERA and 24 strikeouts. Garvin spent the 2014 season with the Double-A Montgomery Biscuits, going 1-8 with a 3.77 ERA with 60 strikeouts across 20 starts; he pitched only 74 innings due to injuries.

On November 20, 2014, the Rays added Garvin to their 40-man roster to protect him from the Rule 5 draft. Garvin underwent Tommy John surgery prior to the 2015 season, and missed the entirety of the year as a result. On November 20, 2015, Garvin was removed from the 40-man roster and sent outright to the Triple-A Durham Bulls.

In 2016, Garvin pitched for the GCL Rays and Charlotte, pitching to a cumulative 0-1 record and a 3.48 ERA with 25 strikeouts over 33 2/3 innings pitched. Garvin did not pitch in 2017, and elected free agency following the season on November 6, 2017.
