= 1900 college baseball season =

Seasons
- ← 1899 1901 →

The 1900 college baseball season, play of college baseball in the United States began in the spring of 1900. Play largely consisted of regional matchups, some organized by conferences, and ended in June. No national championship event was held until 1947.

== New programs ==
- Elon, Idaho, and Northern Illinois played their first varsity seasons.

== Conference winners ==
This is a partial list of conference champions from the 1900 season.

Conference	Regular season winner
Western	Illinois

== Conference standings ==
The following is an incomplete list of conference standings:

1900 Western Conference baseball standings
	Conf.				Overall
Team	W		L	PCT	W		L	PCT
Illinois ‍†‍‍	8	–	2	.800		–		–
Wisconsin ‍‍‍	4	–	3	.571		–		–
Michigan ‍‍‍	6	–	5	.545		–		–
Chicago ‍‍‍	5	–	8	.385		–		–
Northwestern ‍‍‍	2	–	7	.222		–		–
† – Conference champion
