= 1903 college baseball season =

Seasons
- ← 1902 1904 →

The 1903 college baseball season, play of college baseball in the United States began in the spring of 1903. Play largely consisted of regional matchups, some organized by conferences, and ended in June. No national championship event was held until 1947.

== New programs ==
- Louisiana played its first varsity season.

== Conference winners ==
This is a partial list of conference champions from the 1903 season.

Conference	Regular season winner
Big Nine	Illinois
SIAA	Alabama

== Conference standings ==
The following is an incomplete list of conference standings:

1903 Western Conference baseball standings
	Conf.				Overall
Team	W		L	PCT	W		L	PCT
Illinois ‍†‍‍	11	–	1	.917		–		–
Michigan ‍‍‍	7	–	3	.700		–		–
Chicago ‍‍‍	7	–	5	.583		–		–
Wisconsin ‍‍‍	2	–	9	.182		–		–
Northwestern ‍‍‍	1	–	10	.091		–		–
† – Conference champion
