= 1899 Sewanee Tigers baseball team =

American college baseball season

1899 Sewanee Tigers baseball

SIAA co-champion
- Conference: Southern Intercollegiate Athletic Association
- Record: 7–0 (4–0 SIAA)
- Head coach: Henry Ashford
- Captain: Ormond Simkins

The 1899 Sewanee Tigers baseball team represented the Sewanee Tigers baseball team of the University of the South in the 1899 college baseball season. The Tigers were led by coach Henry Ashford and finished in first place in the Southern Intercollegiate Athletic Association with a record of 4–0, 7–0 overall.

== Personnel ==
=== Players ===
1899 Sewanee Tigers roster
Pitchers: - A. H. Davis; - Rex Kilpatrick; Catchers: - Ormond Simkins	Infielders: - J. S. Daugherty; - Henry Seibels; - J. M. Selden; - Bart Sims; Utility: - G. H. Coffey; - A. F. Cooper	Outfielders: - T. Anderson; - Harris G. Cope; - B. B. Hogue; - J. T. Taylor; - J. C. Waties; - L. G. H. Williams

=== Staff ===
1899 Sewanee Tigers staff
- Henry Ashford - coach; - J. E. Miles - manager

== Schedule and results ==
Legend
Sewanee win
Sewanee loss
Tie

1899 Sewanee Tigers baseball game log
Regular season

April/May
Date	Opponent	Site/stadium	Score	Overall record	SIAA record
	Tennessee		W 5–0	1–0	1–0
	Tennessee		W 11–8	2–0	2–0
	Tennessee		W 14–11	3–0	3–0
	Nashville		W 10–5	4–0	4–0
	College of Charleston*		W 14–6	5–0	
May 6	South Carolina*	Sewanee, TN	W 17–0	6–0	
	Augusta YMCA*		W 18–9	7–0	
