= Bill Schwartz (first baseman) =

American baseball player (1884-1961)

- First baseman
- Born: April 22, 1884; Cleveland, Ohio, U.S.
- Died: August 29, 1961 (aged 77); Nashville, Tennessee, U.S.
- Batted: Right Threw: Right

MLB debut
- May 2, 1904, for the Cleveland Naps

Last MLB appearance
- June 16, 1904, for the Cleveland Naps

MLB statistics
- Batting average: .151
- Home runs: 0
- Runs batted in: 0
- Stats at Baseball Reference

Teams
- Cleveland Naps (1904)

William Charles Schwartz (April 22, 1884 – August 29, 1961) was an American Major League Baseball (MLB) first baseman who played for one season. He played for the Cleveland Naps for 24 games during the 1904 Cleveland Naps season. He coached the Southern Association Nashville Vols from 1911 to 1915.
