= 1898 college baseball season =

Seasons
- ← 1897 1899 →

The 1898 college baseball season, play of college baseball in the United States began in the spring of 1898. Play largely consisted of regional matchups, some organized by conferences, and ended in June. No national championship event was held until 1947.

== New programs ==
- Oklahoma and Rhode Island played their first varsity seasons.

== Conference standings ==
The following is an incomplete list of conference standings:

1898 Western Conference baseball standings
	Conf.				Overall
Team	W		L	PCT	W		L	PCT
Chicago ‍†‍‍	8	–	3	.727		–		–
Michigan ‍‍‍	7	–	3	.700		–		–
Illinois ‍‍‍	4	–	4	.500		–		–
Northwestern ‍‍‍	1	–	8	.111		–		–
† – Conference champion

== Conference winners ==
This is a partial list of conference champions from the 1898 season.

Conference	Regular season winner
Western	Chicago
