= 1918 Alabama Crimson Tide baseball team =

American college baseball season

1918 Alabama Crimson Tide baseball

SIAA champion
- Conference: Southern Intercollegiate Athletic Association
- Record: 13–4 (6–2 SIAA)
- Head coach: Loonie Hoojin

The 1918 Alabama Crimson Tide baseball team represented the Alabama Crimson Tide of the University of Alabama in the 1918 NCAA baseball season, winning the SIAA championship. Lena Styles was on the team.

== Schedule and results ==
Legend
| Alabama win |
| Alabama loss |
| Tie |

1918 Alabama Crimson Tide baseball game log

Regular Season
| Date | Opponent | Site/stadium | Score | Overall record | SIAA record |
|---|---|---|---|---|---|
| | Illinois | | W 2–1 | 1–0 | |
| | Illinois | | W 8–3 | 2–0 | |
| | Howard | | W 9–0 | 3–0 | |
| | Howard | | W 8–1 | 4–0 | |
| | Howard | | W 6–3 | 5–0 | |
| | Birmingham Barons | | L 15–2 | 5–1 | |
| | Cincinnati Reds | Montgomery, Alabama | L 10–2 | 5–2 | |
| | LSU | | W 2–0 | 6–2 | |
| | LSU | | L 2–5 | 6–3 | |
| | LSU | | W 3–1 | 7–3 | |
| | LSU | | W 1–0 | 8–3 | |
| | Sewanee | | W 9–1 | 9–3 | |
| | Sewanee | | W 7–0 | 10–3 | |
| | Mississippi A&M | | L 1–2 | 10–4 | |
| | Mississippi A&M | | W 3–2 | 11–4 | |
| | Marion Institute | | W 11–1 | 12–4 | |
| | Marion Institute | | W 11–1 | 13–4 | |
