= 1908 IAAUS baseball season =

Seasons
- ← 1907 1909 →

The 1908 IAAUS baseball season, play of college baseball in the United States organized by the Intercollegiate Athletic Association of the United States (IAAUS), a forerunner of the National Collegiate Athletic Association (NCAA), began in the spring of 1908. Play largely consisted of regional matchups, some organized by conferences, and ended in June. No national championship event was held until 1947.

== Conference Changes ==
- The Missouri Valley Conference played its first season of baseball. Members included Drake, Iowa, Kansas, Missouri, Nebraska, and Washington University. No champion was recorded for the 1908 season.

== Conference winners ==
This is a partial list of conference champions from the 1908 season.

Conference	Regular season winner
Big Nine	Illinois
SIAA	Georgia
