= 1911 Georgia Bulldogs baseball team =

American college baseball season

1911 Georgia Bulldogs baseball

SIAA Champion
- Conference: Southern Intercollegiate Athletic Association
- Record: 17–5 (16–3 SIAA)
- Head coach: Frank B. Anderson
- Home stadium: Herty Field

The 1911 Georgia Bulldogs baseball team represented the Georgia Bulldogs of the University of Georgia in the 1911 IAAUS baseball season, winning the SIAA championship.
