= 1916 Auburn Tigers baseball team =

American college baseball season

1916 Auburn Tigers baseball

SIAA Champion
- Conference: Southern Intercollegiate Athletic Association
- Record: 17–4 ( SIAA)

The 1916 Auburn Tigers baseball team represented the Auburn Tigers of the Auburn University in the 1916 NCAA baseball season.
