= 1918 NCAA baseball season =

American college baseball season

Seasons
- ← 1917 1919 →

The 1918 NCAA baseball season, play of college baseball in the United States organized by the National Collegiate Athletic Association (NCAA) began in the spring of 1918. Play largely consisted of regional matchups, some organized by conferences, and ended in June. No national championship event was held until 1947.

== Conference changes ==
- Stanford joined the Pacific Coast Conference, creating a 6-team league.

== Conference winners ==
This is a partial list of conference champions from the 1918 season.

Conference	Regular season winner
Big Nine	Michigan
Missouri Valley	Missouri
Pacific Coast Conference	Oregon
SIAA	Alabama
Southwest Conference	Texas
