= Auburn Tigers baseball, 1920–1929 =

College baseball team

Auburn Tigers baseball represents the Auburn University in college baseball at the NCAA Division I level.

== 1920 ==
1920 Auburn Tigers baseball

SIAA Champion
- Conference: Southern Intercollegiate Athletic Association
- Record: 16–5–3 ( SIAA)

The 1920 Auburn Tigers baseball team represented the Auburn Tigers of the Auburn University in the 1920 NCAA baseball season. Dot Fulghum and Charlie Gibson and Ed Sherling were on the team.

== 1928 ==
1928 Auburn Tigers baseball

SoCon Champion
- Conference: Southern Conference
- Record: 17–5–2 (14–4–2 SoCon)

The 1928 Auburn Tigers baseball team represented the Auburn Tigers of the Auburn University in the 1928 NCAA baseball season. Auburn won the conference by half a game over Georgia.
