= 1916 NCAA baseball season =

American college baseball season

Seasons
- ← 1915 1917 →

The 1916 NCAA baseball season, play of college baseball in the United States organized by the National Collegiate Athletic Association (NCAA) began in the spring of 1916. Play largely consisted of regional matchups, some organized by conferences, and ended in June. No national championship event was held until 1947.

== Conference Changes ==
- The Pacific Coast Conference (a forerunner of the Pac-12 Conference) played its first season of baseball. Members for the first season included California, Oregon, Oregon State, and Washington.

== Conference winners ==
This is a partial list of conference champions from the 1916 season.

Conference	Regular season winner
Big Nine	Illinois
Missouri Valley	Kansas; Missouri
Pacific Coast Conference	California
SIAA	Auburn
Southwest Conference	Texas
