= 1915 NCAA baseball season =

American college baseball season

Seasons
- ← 1914 1916 →

The 1915 NCAA baseball season, play of college baseball in the United States organized by the National Collegiate Athletic Association (NCAA) began in the spring of 1915. Play largely consisted of regional matchups, some organized by conferences, and ended in June. No national championship event was held until 1947.

== Conference Changes ==
- The Southwest Conference played its first season of baseball. Members for the first season included Baylor, Rice, Southwestern, Texas, and Texas A&M.

== Conference winners ==
This is a partial list of conference champions from the 1915 season.

Conference	Regular season winner
Big Nine	Illinois
Missouri Valley	Kansas
SIAA	Alabama
Southwest Conference	Texas
