= 1911 NCAA baseball season =

American college baseball season

Seasons
- ← 1910 1912 →

The 1911 NCAA baseball season, play of college baseball in the United States organized by the National Collegiate Athletic Association (NCAA) began in the spring of 1911. Play largely consisted of regional matchups, some organized by conferences, and ended in June. No national championship event was held until 1947.

== Conference winners ==
This is a partial list of conference champions from the 1911 season.

Conference	Regular season winner
Big Nine	Illinois
