= 1901 college baseball season =

Seasons
- ← 1900 1902 →

The 1901 college baseball season, play of college baseball in the United States began in the spring of 1901. Play largely consisted of regional matchups, some organized by conferences, and ended in June. No national championship event was held until 1947.

== New programs ==
- Washington played its first season of baseball.
- Eastern Michigan and North Dakota also launched their varsity programs.

== Conference winners ==
This is a partial list of conference champions from the 1901 season.

Conference	Regular season winner
Big Nine	Michigan
SIAA	North Carolina

== Conference standings ==
The following is an incomplete list of conference standings:

1901 Western Conference baseball standings
	Conf.				Overall
Team	W		L	PCT	W		L	PCT
Michigan ‍†‍‍	8	–	2	.800		–		–
Illinois ‍‍‍	6	–	4	.600		–		–
Chicago ‍‍‍	7	–	8	.467		–		–
Wisconsin ‍‍‍	3	–	4	.429		–		–
Northwestern ‍‍‍	1	–	7	.125		–		–
† – Conference champion
