= 1910 IAAUS baseball season =

1910 NCAA baseball season

Seasons
- ← 1909 1911 →

The 1910 NCAA baseball season, play of college baseball in the United States organized by the National Collegiate Athletic Association (NCAA) began in the spring of 1910. Play largely consisted of regional matchups, some organized by conferences, and ended in June. No national championship event was held until 1947.

== Conference winners ==
This is a partial list of conference champions from the 1910 season.

Conference	Regular season winner
Big Nine	Illinois
Missouri Valley	Missouri
SIAA	Vanderbilt
