= Tinsley Ginn =

American baseball player

- Outfielder
- Born: September 26, 1891; Royston, Georgia, U.S.
- Died: August 30, 1931 (aged 39); Atlanta, Georgia, U.S.
- Batted: Left Threw: Right

MLB debut
- June 27, 1914, for the Cleveland Naps

Last MLB appearance
- June 30, 1914, for the Cleveland Naps

MLB statistics
- Batting average: .000
- Home runs: 0
- Runs batted in: 0
- Stats at Baseball Reference

Teams
- Cleveland Naps (1914)

Tinsley Rucker Ginn (September 26, 1891 – August 30, 1931) was an American Major League Baseball outfielder who played for one season. He played with the Cleveland Naps for two games during the 1914 season. He attended the University of Georgia.
