= 1909 IAAUS baseball season =

Seasons
- ← 1908 1910 →

The 1909 IAAUS baseball season, play of college baseball in the United States organized by the Intercollegiate Athletic Association of the United States (IAAUS), a forerunner of the National Collegiate Athletic Association (NCAA), began in the spring of 1909. Play largely consisted of regional matchups, some organized by conferences, and ended in June. No national championship event was held until 1947.

== New programs ==
- Oklahoma State (then Oklahoma A&M) played their first varsity season.

== Conference winners ==
This is a partial list of conference champions from the 1909 season.

Conference	Regular season winner
Big Nine	Purdue
Missouri Valley	Nebraska
SIAA	Alabama
