= Vanderbilt Commodores baseball =

NCAA college baseball team

- 2026 Vanderbilt Commodores baseball team
- Founded: 1886; 140 years ago
- Conference history: Independent (1886–1891); SIAA (1892–1921); Southern Conference (1922–1932); Southeastern Conference (1933–present)
- Overall record: 2,369-1,923-31
- University: Vanderbilt University
- Athletic director: Candice Storey Lee
- Head coach: Tim Corbin (24th season)
- Conference: Southeastern Conference
- Location: Nashville, Tennessee
- Home stadium: Hawkins Field (capacity: 3,700)
- Nickname: Commodores, VandyBoys
- Colors: Black and gold

College World Series champions
- 2014, 2019

College World Series runner-up
- 2015, 2021

College World Series appearances
- 2011, 2014, 2015, 2019, 2021

NCAA regional champions
- 2004, 2010, 2011, 2013, 2014, 2015, 2017, 2018, 2019, 2021

NCAA tournament appearances
- 1973, 1974, 1980, 2004, 2006, 2007, 2008, 2009, 2010, 2011, 2012, 2013, 2014, 2015, 2016, 2017, 2018, 2019, 2021, 2022, 2023, 2024, 2025

Conference tournament champions
- 1980, 2007, 2019, 2023, 2025

Conference regular season champions
- 1910, 1912, 1921, 1973, 1974, 1980, 2007, 2011, 2013, 2019

The Vanderbilt Commodores baseball team is an American National Collegiate Athletic Association (NCAA) college baseball team from Vanderbilt University in Nashville, Tennessee. The team participates in the Southeastern Conference (SEC) and plays its home games on campus at Hawkins Field. The Commodores are coached by three-time National Coach of the Year and three-time SEC Coach of the Year, Tim Corbin. During Corbin's tenure as head coach, Vanderbilt has become one of the premier college baseball programs in the United States, responsible for 19 first-round picks in the MLB draft.

== History ==
Vanderbilt first fielded a baseball team in 1886. Herbert Charles Sanborn, the chair of the Department of Philosophy and Psychology from 1921 to 1942, who was also the president of the Nashville German-American Society, coached the team in 1912–1913. Baseball became a scholarship sport in 1968.

The Commodores secured only three NCAA appearances in the 20th century—in 1973, 1974, and 1980. They had only three other winning seasons in SEC play in the first 35 years of the scholarship era. However, they have been to every NCAA tournament but one since 2004. The team qualified for the NCAA Super Regionals in 2004, had the nation's top recruiting class in 2005 according to Baseball America, made the NCAA field again in 2006, and won the 2007 SEC regular-season and SEC tournament crowns. The Commodores were ranked first in most polls for a majority of the 2007 season and earned the #1 national seed for the 2007 NCAA tournament. Vanderbilt's victory over the University of Virginia in the finals of the 2014 NCAA tournament marks the program's first national title and second appearance in the College World Series, having first appeared in 2011. In 2019, Vanderbilt's fourth College World Series appearance, they beat Michigan two games to one in the finals, winning their second national title.

== Stadium ==
The original venue for the Commodores ball club was McGugin Field. Currently, the Commodores play their home games at Hawkins Field, which is an on-campus facility with a 3,700 seat capacity. Temporary outfield bleachers were installed for the 2007 Regionals and all of the 2008 season, bringing the capacity to 3,535. In May 2008, Vanderbilt announced extensive plans to upgrade its athletic facilities, including the addition of permanent seats down the first base line and outfield seats in both left-center and right field. These additions increased the size of Hawkins Field to its current capacity of 3,700 seats. It is adjacent to both Vanderbilt Stadium and Memorial Gymnasium and is across the street from the McGugin Center. Hawkins Field opened in 2002 and is named after a donor who gave $2 million to help finance construction. The stadium was also the site of the first NCAA Baseball Tournament Regional that Vanderbilt ever hosted when it was the site of the Nashville Regional in 2007. Vanderbilt and Hawkins Field again hosted Regionals in 2011, 2013, 2014, 2015, 2016, 2018, 2019, 2021, and 2023 along with hosting Super Regionals in 2011, 2013, 2014, 2015, 2018, 2019 and 2021.

== Head coaches ==
Tenure	Coach	Years	G	W	L	T	Winning %
1904	T. W. Davis	1	25	19	6	0	.760
1908	Grantland Rice	1	22	11	9	2	.538
1909–1910	E. J. Hamilton	2	38	19	18	1	.513
1911	Drew Fann	1	15	8	7	0	.533
1912–1913	Herbert Charles Sanborn	2	40	21	17	2	.550
1914	Dick Lyle	1	23	13	8	2	.609
1917, 24–40&52	Bill Schwartz	19	268	155	112	1	.580
1918	John Palmer	1	13	5	8	0	.384
1919	Ray Morrison	1	6	3	3	0	.500
1920–1921	Byrd Douglas	2	50	31	19	0	.620
1922–1923	Wallace Wade	2	39	26	13	0	.667
1942&1947	James A. Scoggins	2	40	20	19	1	.513
1948	Tommy Harrison	1	22	11	9	2	.545
1949–51&54–56	Dave Scobey	6	118	43	75	0	.364
1953	Woody Johnson	1	18	5	13	0	.278
1957–1959&61	Dick Richardson	4	87	24	63	0	.276
1960	Harley Boss	3	63	21	42	0	.333
1962	Jerry Elliot	1	22	2	18	2	.136
1965–1967	George Archie	3	60	18	42	0	.300
1968–1978	Larry Schmittou	11	559	306	252	1	.548
1979–2002	Roy Mewbourne	24	1272	655	608	9	.518
2003–present	Tim Corbin	22	1,365	921	443	1	.675
Totals	23 coaches	111	3652	2337	1801	24	.564

Longest Tenure
Rank	Name	Seasons
1	Roy Mewbourne	24
2	Tim Corbin	22
3	Bill Schwartz	19

Most Wins
Rank	Name	Wins
1	Tim Corbin	921
2	Roy Mewbourne	655
3	Larry Schmittou	306

Best Winning Pct.
Rank	Name	Pct.
1	T. W. Davis	.760
2	Tim Corbin	.675
3	Wallace Wade	.667

== Year-by-year results ==
Records taken from the 2011 Vanderbilt baseball media guide.
In 1997, Vanderbilt forfeited 30 games due to an ineligible player.

Year	Head coach	W	L	T	Winning %	Conf. W	Conf. L	Conf. T	Winning %	Conf. finish	Notes
1886	Unavailable	1	1	0	.500	0	0		.000	N/A	—
1887	Unavailable	1	0	0	1.000	0	0	0	.000	N/A	—
1888	Unavailable	2	0	0	1 .000	0	0	0	.000	N/A	—
1889	Unavailable	1	1	0	.500	0	0	0	.000	N/A	—
1890	No Records Available	0	0	0	.000	0	0	0	.000	N/A	—
1891	Unavailable	0	3	0	.000	0	0	0	.000	N/A	—
1892	Unavailable	5	4	0	.556	0	0	0	.000	N/A	—
1893	Unavailable	5	3	2	.600	0	0	0	.000	N/A	—
1894	Unavailable	4	4	0	.500	0	0	0	.000	N/A	—
1895	Unavailable	3	0	0	1 .000	0	0	0	.000	N/A	—
1896	Unavailable	7	2	1	.750	0	0	0	.000	N/A	—
1897	Unavailable	8	4	0	.500	0	0	0	.000	N/A	—
1898	Unavailable	8	2	1	.773	0	0	0	.000	N/A	—
1899	Unavailable	5	4	0	.556	0	0	0	.000	N/A	—
1900	Unavailable	8	7	0	.533	0	0	0	.000	N/A	—
1901	Unavailable	9	3	0	.750	0	0	0	.000	N/A	—
1902	Unavailable	11	6	1	.639	0	0	0	.000	N/A	—
1903	Unavailable	15	2	0	.882	0	0	0	.000	N/A	—
1904	T.W. Davis	19	6	0	.760	0	0	0	.000	N/A	—
1905	Unavailable	22	5	0	.815	0	0	0	.000	N/A	—
1906	Unavailable	11	10	0	.524	0	0	0	.000	N/A	—
1907	Unavailable	15	5	0	.750	0	0	0	.000	N/A	—
1908	Grantland Rice	11	9	2	.545	0	0	0	.000	N/A	—
1909	E.J. Hamilton	7	12	1	.375	0	0	0	.000	N/A	—
1910	E.J. Hamilton	12	6	0	.667	0	0	0	.000	N/A	SIAA Champions
1911	Anderson Weakley	8	7	0	.533	0	0	0	.000	N/A	—
1912	Herbert Sanborn	13	7	0	.650	0	0	0	.000	N/A	SIAA Champions
1913	Herbert Sanborn	8	10	2	.450	0	0	0	.000	N/A	—
1914	Dick Lyle	13	8	2	.609	0	0	0	.000	N/A	—
1915	Unavailable	15	13	2	.533	0	0	0	.000	N/A	—
1916	Unavailable	12	4	0	.750	0	0	0	.000	N/A	—
1917	Bill Schwartz	1	0	1	.750	0	0	0	.000	N/A	—
1918	Palmer	5	8	0	.385	0	0	0	.000	N/A	—
1919	Ray Morrison	3	3	0	.500	0	0	0	.000	N/A	—
1920	Byrd Douglas	11	11	0	.500	0	0	0	.000	N/A	—
1921	Byrd Douglas	20	8	0	.714	0	0	0	.000	N/A	SIAA Champions
1922	Wallace Wade	14	7	0	.667	0	0	0	.000	N/A	—
1923	Wallace Wade	12	6	0	.667	0	0	0	.000	N/A	—
1924	Bill Schwartz	5	9	0	.357	0	0	0	.000	N/A	—
1925	Bill Schwartz	10	8	0	.556	0	0	0	.000	N/A	—
1926	Bill Schwartz	13	13	0	.500	0	0	0	.000	N/A	—
1927	Bill Schwartz	11	12	0	.478	0	0	0	.000	N/A	—
1928	Bill Schwartz	7	6	0	.538	0	0	0	.000	N/A	—
1929	Bill Schwartz	17	5	0	.773	0	0	0	.000	N/A	—
1930	Bill Schwartz	9	7	0	.563	0	0	0	.000	N/A	—
1931	Bill Schwartz	7	7	0	.500	0	0	0	.000	N/A	—
1932	Bill Schwartz	16	4	0	.800	0	0	0	.000	N/A	—
1933	Unavailable	9	1	0	.900	0	0	0	.000	N/A	—
1934	Bill Schwartz	5	6	0	.455	0	0	0	.000	N/A	—
1935	Bill Schwartz	10	2	0	.833	0	0	0	.000	N/A	—
1936	Bill Schwartz	15	2	0	.882	0	0	0	.000	N/A	—
1937	Bill Schwartz	11	4	0	.733	0	0	0	.000	N/A	—
1938	Bill Schwartz	6	3	0	.667	0	0	0	.000	N/A	—
1939	Bill Schwartz	11	5	0	.688	0	0	0	.000	N/A	—
1940	Bill Schwartz	8	2	0	.800	0	0	0	.000	N/A	—
1941	Unavailable	8	10	0	.444	0	0	0	.000	N/A	—
1942	Jim Scoggins	10	8	1	.553	0	0	0	.000	N/A	—
1943	Unavailable	14	8	0	.636	0	0	0	.000	N/A	—
1944	No team due to WWII	0	0	0	.000	0	0	0	.000	N/A	—
1945	No team due to WWII	0	0	0	.000	0	0	0	.000	N/A	—
1946	No team	0	0	0	.000	0	0	0	.000	N/A	—
1947	Jim Scoggins	10	11	0	.476	2	5	0	.286		—
1948	Tommy Harrison	11	9	2	.523	7	8	1	.333		—
1949	Dave Scobey	8	11	1	.425	4	8	0	.333		—
1950	Dave Scobey	6	16	0	.273	4	13	0	.308		—
1951	Dave Scobey	0	18	1	.026	0	13	1	.036		—
1952	Bill Schwartz	4	16	0	.200	2	13	0	.133		—
1953	Woody Johnson	5	13	0	.278	3	11	0	.133		—
1954	Dave Scobey	11	9	1	.548	8	7	1	.531		—
1955	Dave Scobey	12	6	0	.667	10	4	0	.714		—
1956	Dave Scobey	6	15	0	.200	3	12	0	.200		—
1957	Dick Richardson	8	14	0	.364	3	13	0	.188		—
1958	Dick Richardson	4	9	0	.308	2	6	0	.250		—
1959	Dick Richardson	5	15	0	.250	2	13	0	.133		—
1960	Harley Boss	8	13	0	.381	5	8	0	.385		—
1961	Dick Richardson	7	15	0	.318	2	11	0	.154		—
1962	Jerry Elliot	2	18	2	.119	0	16	2	.056		—
1963	Harley Boss	6	15	0	.400	4	13	0	.235		—
1964	Harley Boss	7	14	0	.333	4	12	0	.250		—
1965	George Archie	5	14	0	.263	1	11	0	.083		—
1966	George Archie	2	16	0	.111	1	12	0	.077		—
1967	George Archie	11	12	0	.478	8	9	0	.471		—
1968	Larry Schmittou	7	15	0	.318	2	13	0	.133	10th	—
1969	Larry Schmittou	21	18	0	.538	3	10	0	.231	10th	—
1970	Larry Schmittou	24	16	0	.600	5	10	0	.333	7th	—
1971	Larry Schmittou	33	19	0	.635	10	7	0	.588	2nd	SEC East Division Champions
1972	Larry Schmittou	35	15	0	.700	13	5	0	.722	2nd	SEC East Division Champions
1973	Larry Schmittou	36	16	0	.692	13	5	0	.722	1st	SEC Champions; NCAA regional
1974	Larry Schmittou	37	22	0	.627	11	4	0	.733	1st	SEC Champions; NCAA regional
1975	Larry Schmittou	30	39	0	.435	7	9	0	.438	t-7th	—
1976	Larry Schmittou	27	23	0	.540	12	12	0	.500	4th	—
1977	Larry Schmittou	25	25	1	.500	13	12	0	.520	3rd	—
1978	Larry Schmittou	31	17	0	.646	10	13	0	.435	8th	—
1979	Roy Mewbourne	21	25	0	.457	8	14	0	.364	8th	—
1980	Roy Mewbourne	34	21	1	.616	13	9	0	.591	3rd	SECT Champions; NCAA regional
1981	Roy Mewbourne	26	25	1	.510	9	12	1	.432	6th	—
1982	Roy Mewbourne	28	17	2	.617	11	12	1	.479	6th	—
1983	Roy Mewbourne	22	23	1	.489	6	15	0	.286	9th	—
1984	Roy Mewbourne	28	17	0	.622	9	11	0	.450	6th	—
1985	Roy Mewbourne	35	16	0	.686	10	13	0	.435	t-6th	—
1986	Roy Mewbourne	25	29	0	.463	9	18	0	.333	9th	—
1987	Roy Mewbourne	27	25	0	.519	7	20	0	.259	9th	—
1988	Roy Mewbourne	30	23	0	.566	11	16	0	.407	t-6th	—
1989	Roy Mewbourne	31	21	2	.593	11	15	1	.426	7th	—
1990	Roy Mewbourne	28	30	0	.483	12	13	0	.480	5th	—
1991	Roy Mewbourne	29	27	0	.518	8	19	0	.296	9th	—
1992	Roy Mewbourne	29	24	1	.546	11	12	0	.478	6th	—
1993	Roy Mewbourne	32	23	1	.580	11	15	1	.426	8th	—
1994	Roy Mewbourne	28	30	0	.483	10	20	0	.333	10th	—
1995	Roy Mewbourne	26	30	0	.464	8	19	0	.296	11th	—
1996	Roy Mewbourne	29	25	0	.537	14	16	0	.467	8th	—
1997√	Roy Mewbourne	31	24	0	.564	14	16	0	.467	8th	–
1998	Roy Mewbourne	25	28	0	.472	6	24	0	.200	12th	—
1999	Roy Mewbourne	22	33	0	.400	8	22	0	.267	12th	—
2000	Roy Mewbourne	21	33	0	.389	5	24	0	.172	12th	—
2001	Roy Mewbourne	24	31	0	.436	9	21	0	.300	11th	—
2002	Roy Mewbourne	24	27	0	.471	7	21	0	.250	11th	—
2003	Tim Corbin	27	28	0	.491	14	16	0	.467	t-6th	—
2004	Tim Corbin	45	19	0	.703	16	14	0	.533	7th	NCAA Super Regional
2005	Tim Corbin	34	21	0	.618	13	17	0	.433	t-8th	—
2006	Tim Corbin	38	27	0	.585	16	14	0	.533	6th	NCAA regional
2007	Tim Corbin	54	13	0	.806	22	8	0	.733	1st	SEC Champions; SECT Champions; NCAA regional
2008	Tim Corbin	41	22	0	.651	14	13	0	.519	6th	NCAA regional
2009	Tim Corbin	37	27	0	.578	12	17	0	.414	8th	NCAA regional
2010	Tim Corbin	45	20	0	.692	16	12	0	.571	3rd	NCAA Super Regional
2011	Tim Corbin	54	12	0	.830	22	8	0	.724	t 1st	SEC Champions; College World Series
2012	Tim Corbin	35	28	0	.556	16	14	0	.533	4th	NCAA regional
2013	Tim Corbin	54	12	0	.830	26	3	0	.897	1st	SEC Champions; NCAA Super Regional
2014	Tim Corbin	51	21	0	.704	17	13	0	.567	3rd (East)	NCAA Division I Champions
2015	Tim Corbin	51	21	0	.704	20	10	0	.666	1st (East)	SEC East Division Champions; NCAA Division I Runners-up
2016	Tim Corbin	43	19	0	.694	18	12	0	.600	3rd (East)	NCAA regional
2017	Tim Corbin	36	25	1	.581	15	13	1	.517	3rd (East)	NCAA Super Regional
2018	Tim Corbin	35	27	0	.565	16	14	0	.533	4th (East)	NCAA Super Regional
2019	Tim Corbin	59	12	0	.831	23	7	0	.767	1st (East)	SEC Champions; SECT Champions; NCAA Division I Champions
2020	Tim Corbin	13	5	0	.722	0	0	0	N/A	N/A	2020 season cancelled after March 11 due to the COVID-19 pandemic. Listed results are unofficial, and not counted in the totals below.
2021	Tim Corbin	49	18	0	.731	19	10	0	.655	2nd (East)	NCAA Division I Runners-up
2022	Tim Corbin	39	23	0	.629	14	16	0	.467	4th (East)	NCAA regional
2023	Tim Corbin	42	20	0	.677	19	11	0	.633	2nd (East)	SECT Champions; NCAA regional
2024	Tim Corbin	38	21	0	.644	13	17	0	.433	4th (East)	NCAA regional
Totals		2434√	1950	31	.555	755	961	10	.440	—	6 SEC Championships; 4 SEC Tournament Championships; 21 NCAA tournament 5 College World Series; 2 National Championships

√ Vanderbilt forfeited 30 games due to Hunter Bledsoe being ineligible player.

== NCAA tournaments ==
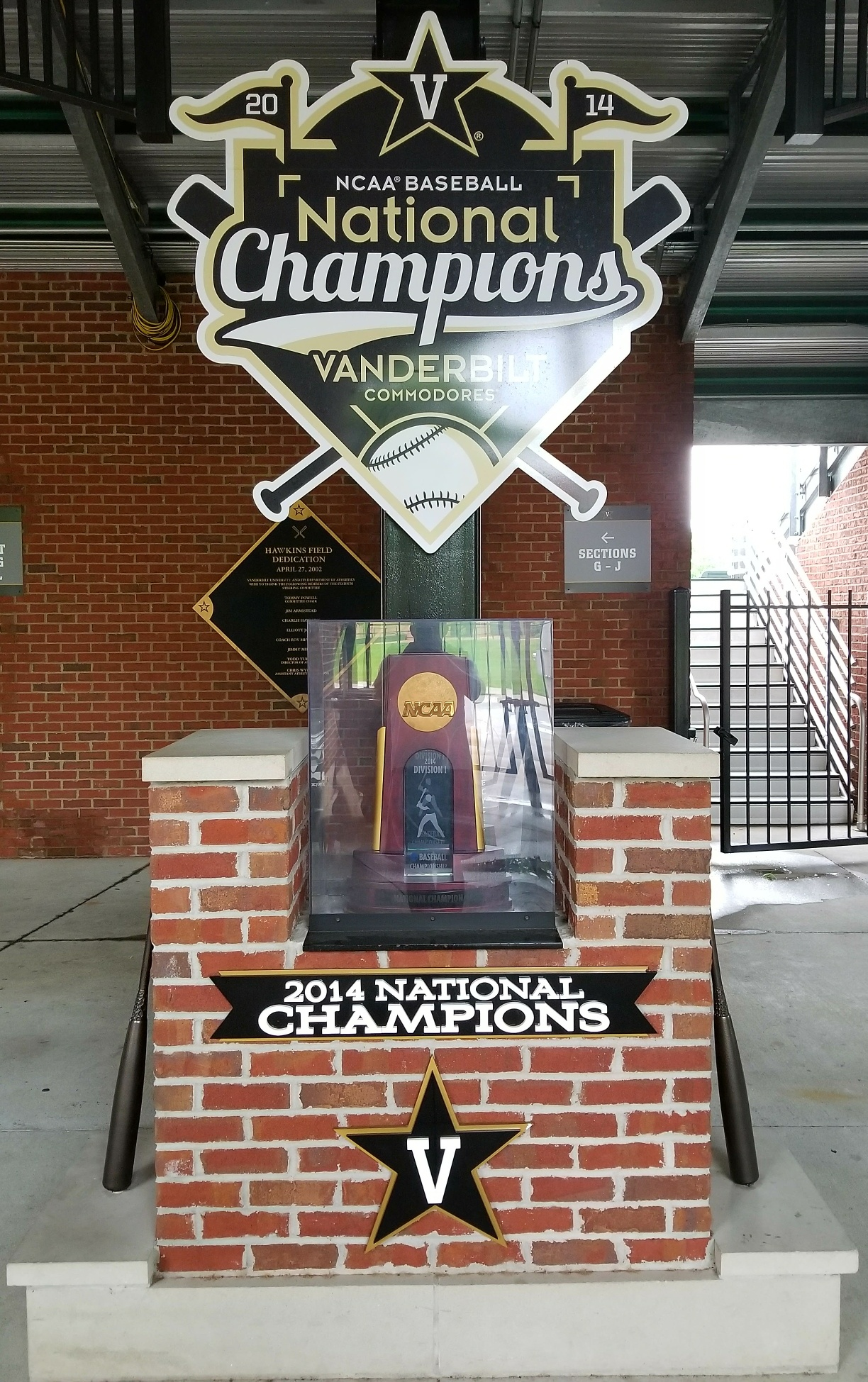
2014 NCAA National Championship Trophy

- The NCAA Division I baseball tournament started in 1947.
- The format of the tournament has changed through the years.

Year	Record	Pct	Notes
1973	2–2	.500	Eliminated by Miami in the Starkville Regional
1974	1–2	.333	Eliminated by Georgia Southern in the Starkville Regional
1980	0–2	.000	Eliminated by UNO in the Tallahassee Regional
2004	3–2	.600	Won Charlottesville Regional; Eliminated by Texas in the Austin Super Regional
2006	2–2	.500	Eliminated by Georgia Tech in the Atlanta Regional Finals
2007	3–2	.600	#1 Overall seed in the tournament Eliminated by Michigan in the Nashville Regional Finals
2008	1–2	.333	Eliminated by Oklahoma in the Tempe Regional Semi-finals.
2009	3–2	.600	Eliminated by Louisville in the Louisville Regional Finals
2010	5–3	.625	Won Louisville Regional; Eliminated by Florida State in the Tallahassee Super Regional
2011	7–2	.778	#6 Overall seed in the tournament Won Nashville Regional; Won Nashville Super Regional; Finished Third in the 2011 College World Series (Eliminated by Florida as the SEC swept the podium)
2012	2–2	.500	Eliminated by North Carolina State in the Raleigh Regional Finals
2013	3–3	.500	#2 Overall seed in the tournament Won Nashville Regional; Eliminated by Louisville in the Nashville Super Regional
2014	10–3	.769	Won Nashville Regional; Won Nashville Super Regional; Won College World Series
2015	9–2	.818	Won Nashville Regional; Won Champaign Super Regional; College World Series Runner-up (lost to Virginia)
2016	0–2	.000	Eliminated by Washington in the Nashville Regional. Vanderbilt pitcher Donny Everett died the night before the Regional.
2017	3–3	.500	Won Clemson Regional; Eliminated by Oregon State in Corvallis Super Regional
2018	4-2	.666	Won Clemson Regional; Eliminated by Mississippi St. in Nashville Super Regional
2019	10-2	.833	#2 Overall seed in the tournament Won Nashville Regional; Won Nashville Super Regional; Won College World Series
2021	9-3	.750	#4 Overall seed in the tournament Won Nashville Regional; Won Nashville Super Regional; College World Series Runner-up (lost to Mississippi State)
2022	3-2	.600	Eliminated by Oregon State in the Corvallis Regional Finals
2023	1-2	.333	#6 Overall seed in the tournament Eliminated by Xavier in the Nashville Regional
2024	0-2	.000	Eliminated by Coastal Carolina in the Clemson Regional
2025	1-2	.333	#1 Overall seed in the tournament Eliminated by Wright State in the Nashville Regional
TOTALS	82–51	.617	23 Regional Appearances; 10 Super Regional Appearances; 5 College World Series appearances 2 National Championships

== NCAA records ==
- Most stolen bases in one inning (6) SEC Opponent Florida Gators May 26, 2012
- Most stolen bases in one inning NCAA Opponent Florida Gators May 26, 2012
- Most stolen bases in a game (7) Opponent Florida Gators May 26, 2012

== Conference affiliations ==
Vanderbilt has been affiliated with the following conferences.

- Independent (1886–1891)
- SIAA (1892–1921)
- Southern Conference (1922–1932)
- Southeastern Conference (1933–present)

== Conference championships ==
Vanderbilt has won 10 conference season championships, 4 conference tournament championships, and 9 conference division championships.

Year	Conference Championship	Coach	Overall Record	Conference Record
1910	SIAA Season Championship	E.J. Hamilton	12-6	7–5
1912	SIAA Season Championship	Herbert Sanborn	13-7	12–2
1921	SIAA Season Championship	Byrd Douglas	20-8	14–4
1971	SEC East Division Championship	Larry Schmittou	33-19	10-7
1972	SEC East Division Championship	Larry Schmittou	35-15	13-5
1973	SEC Season Championship; SEC East Division Championship	Larry Schmittou	36-16	13-5
1974	SEC Season Championship; SEC East Division Championship	Larry Schmittou	37-22	11-4
1980	SEC Tournament Championship	Roy Mewbourne	34-21-1	13-9
2007	SEC Tournament Championship; SEC Season Championship; SEC East Division Championship	Tim Corbin	54-13	22-8
2011	SEC Season Championship; SEC East Division Championship	Tim Corbin	54-12	22-8
2013	SEC Season Championship; SEC East Division Championship	Tim Corbin	54-12	26-3
2015	SEC East Division Championship	Tim Corbin	51-21	20-10
2019	SEC Tournament Championship; SEC Season Championship; SEC East Division Championship	Tim Corbin	59-12	23-7
2023	SEC Tournament Championship	Tim Corbin	42-20	19-11

== Rivalries ==
=== Tennessee ===
Vanderbilt's primary rivalry is with the Tennessee Volunteers. Tennessee leads the all time series 188–169–2. The rivalry intensified in the 21st century where both programs had sustained success, including multiple college world series appearances and nationals championships.

=== Louisville ===
The Vanderbilt rivalry with the Louisville Cardinals is a baseball rivalry known as the Battle of the Barrel. The two teams first met in 1971 and have met annually since 2008 to play in a midweek game for a traveling oak barrel trophy. The rivalry has been amplified by the success of the two programs during the 21st century, the close proximity of the two universities, and the regular postseason encounters. Vanderbilt leads the series 30–14, but the trophy series is tied 7–7.

== Individual school records ==
=== Batting ===
- Batting Average
  Season: .459 – Derrick Jones
  Career: .425 – Hunter Bledsoe
- Hits
  Game: 6 (Ralph Greenbaum)
  Season: 111 (Warner Jones)
  Career: 300 (Dominic De La Osa)
- Runs Scored
  Game: 5 (10 players)
  Season: (Pedro Álvarez)
  Career: 208 (Nick Morrow)
- Doubles
  Game: 4 (Matt Kata)
  Season: 27 (Warner Jones)
  Career: 63 (Dominic De La Osa)
- Triples
  Game: 2 (8 players)
  Season: 8 (Ryan Klosterman)
  Career: 21 (Tony Kemp)
- Home Runs
  Game: 3 (3 players)
  Season: 25 (J. J. Bleday)
  Career: 49 (Pedro Álvarez, Scotti Madison)
- Total Bases
  Game: 13 (John McLean, Greg Thomas)
  Season: 186 (Pedro Álvarez)
  Career: 452 (Nick Morrow)
- Runs Batted In
  Game: 9 (David Joiner)
  Season: 74 (Warner Jones, Clint Johnston)
  Career: 181 (Nick Morrow)
- Base on Balls
  Game: 5 (3 players)
  Season: 63 (Vee Hightower)
  Career: 146 (Steve Chandler)
- Stolen Bases
  Game: 5 (3 players)
  Season: 51 (Bob Schabes)
  Career: 96 (Charles DeFrance)
- Strikeouts
  Game: 5 (George Flower)
  Season: 73 (Gary Burns)
  Career: 182 (Cam Hazen)
- Hitting Streak
  38 Games (Ryan Flaherty)

=== Pitching ===
- Wins
  Season: 14 (Tyler Beede)
  Season: 14 (Carson Fulmer)
  Career: 32 (Patrick Raby)
- Winning Percentage
  Season: 1.000 (Steve Burger, 6–0)
  Career: .792 (Jack Nuismer)
- Saves
  Season: 17 (Tyler Brown)
  Career: 26 (Brian Miller)
- Games Pitched
  Season: 36 (Joe Barbao)
  Career: 116 (David Daniels)
- Innings Pitched
  Game: 13 (Scott Newell)
  Season: 133.1 (David Price)
  Career: 340.0 (Jim Heins)
- Earned Run Average
  Season: 1.07 (Jimmy Stephens)
  Career: 1.68 (Jeff Peeples)
- Strikeouts
  Game: 23 (Doug Wessel)
  Season: 194 (David Price)
  Career: 441 (David Price)

== Player awards ==
=== Pedro Alvarez ===
- 2007 Golden Spikes Award Finalist
- 2007 Baseball America First Team All American
- 2007 National Collegiate Baseball Writers Association First Team All American
- 2007 American Baseball Coaches Association Second Team All American
- 2006 Baseball America National Freshman of the Year
- 2006 Collegiate Baseball National Freshman of the Year
- 2006 Baseball America First Team All American

=== David Price ===
- 2007 Roger Clemens Award Winner
- 2007 Golden Spikes Award Winner
- 2007 Dick Howser Trophy Winner
- 2007 Baseball America College Player of the Year
- 2007 American Baseball Coaches Association National Player of the Year
- 2007 American Baseball Coaches Association First Team All American
- 2007 Brooks Wallace Award Winner
- 2007 Baseball America College All-America First Team
- 2007 Collegiate Baseball National Player of the Year
- 2007 National Collegiate Baseball Writers Association First Team All-American
- 2007 National Collegiate Baseball Writers Association District Player of the Year
- 2007 SEC Male Athlete of the Year
- 2007 SEC Pitcher of the Year
- 2007 First Team All-SEC
- 2006 Golden Spikes Award Finalist
- 2006 Baseball America Summer Player of the Year

=== Casey Weathers ===
- 2007 Baseball America First Team All American
- 2007 Collegiate Baseball First Team All American
- 2007 American Baseball Coaches Association First Team All American
- 2007 National Collegiate Baseball Writers Association Third Team All American
- 2007 First Team All SEC

=== Dansby Swanson ===
- 2014 All-Southeastern Conference (SEC) First Team
- 2014 College World Series Most Outstanding Player
- 2015 All-SEC Second Team
- 2015 Baseball America First Team All-American
- 2015 Collegiate Baseball First Team All-American
- 2015 Coaches' Poll First Team All-American
- First Overall Pick of the 2015 MLB draft by the Arizona Diamondbacks

=== SEC awards ===
- Pitcher of the Year

David Price - 2007
Grayson Garvin - 2011
Carson Fulmer - 2015

- Player of the Year Award

Hunter Bledsoe - 1999
Tony Kemp - 2013
JJ Bleday - 2019

- Freshman of the Year Award

Pedro Alvarez - 2006
Tony Kemp - 2011
Enrique Bradfield - 2021

== First Team All-Americans ==
Player	Position	Year(s)	Selectors
Scotti Madison	Catcher	1980†	ABCA, SN
Vee Hightower	Outfield	1993	CB, Mizuno
Hunter Bledsoe	Third Base	1999	CB, LS
Warner Jones	Second Base	2004	ABCA, BA
Pedro Alvarez	Third Base	2006, 2007	BA, NCBWA
David Price	Pitcher	2007†	ABCA, BA, CB, NCBWA
Casey Weathers	Pitcher	2007†	ABCA, BA, CB
Dominic de la Osa	Outfielder	2007	ABCA, CB
Sonny Gray	Pitcher	2011	ABCA
Jason Esposito	Third Base	2011	ABCA
Tyler Beede	Pitcher	2013	NCBWA
Tony Kemp	Second Base	2013†	NCBWA, BA, ABCA, CB
Carson Fulmer	Pitcher	2015†	NCBWA, BA, ABCA, CB
Dansby Swanson	Shortstop	2015†	NCBWA, BA, ABCA
J. J. Bleday	Outfielder	2019†	ABCA, BA, NCBWA
Austin Martin	Hitter	2019	CB
Kumar Rocker	Pitcher	2020, 2021†	CB; ABCA, BA, CB, NCBWA
Mason Hickman	Pitcher	2020	CB
Enrique Bradfield	Outfielder	2021, 2022	NCBWA, ABCA; NCBWA
Jack Leiter	Pitcher	2021†	ABCA, BA, CB, NCBWA
Source:"SEC All-Americas". secsports.com. Archived from the original on May 28, 2008. ABCA: American Baseball Coaches Association BA: Baseball America CB: Collegiate Baseball NCBWA: National Collegiate Baseball Writers Association LS: Louisville Slugger † Denotes consensus All-American

== Notable players ==
- Pedro Álvarez, infielder, former 1st round draft pick (2nd overall, 2008, Pirates)
- Mike Baxter, outfielder, former Padre, Met, Dodger, and Cub
- Tyler Beede, pitcher, twice was a 1st round draft pick (2014, Giants), pitches for the Giants
- J. J. Bleday, outfielder, 4th overall draft pick (2019, Marlins)
- Ben Bowden, pitcher, former 2nd round draft pick (2016, Rockies)
- Walker Buehler, All Star pitcher Los Angeles Dodgers, former 1st round draft pick (24th overall, 2015, Dodgers)
- Matt Buschmann, pitcher, Arizona Diamondbacks
- Curt Casali, catcher, Seattle Mariners
- Nick Christiani, pitcher, former Cincinnati Red
- Vince Conde, infielder, former 9th round draft pick (2014, Yankees)
- Joey Cora, infielder, former Seattle Mariners All Star 2B
- Caleb Cotham, pitcher, Cincinnati Reds
- Jason Delay, catcher, Pittsburgh Pirates
- Ryan Flaherty, infielder, Atlanta Braves
- Jake Eder, pitcher, former fourth round pick (104th overall, 2020, Miami Marlins)
- Drake Fellows, pitcher, 6th round pick (2019, Padres)
- Carson Fulmer, pitcher, former 1st round draft pick (8th overall, 2015, White Sox)
- Grayson Garvin, pitcher, former 1st round draft pick (59th overall, 2011, Rays)
- Sonny Gray, pitcher, Minnesota Twins, former 1st round draft pick (18th overall, 2011, Athletics)
- Drew Hayes, pitcher, former Cincinnati Red
- Taylor Hill, pitcher, former Washington National
- Matt Kata, infielder, former Arizona Diamondback
- Tony Kemp, infielder, Oakland Athletics
- Jeren Kendall, outfielder, Second Team All-SEC (2016)
- Jensen Lewis, pitcher, former Cleveland Indian
- Austin Martin, infielder, Minnesota Twins, 1st round pick (5th overall, Toronto Blue Jays, 2020)
- Mike Minor, pitcher, former 1st round draft pick (7th overall, 2009, Braves)
- Josh Paul, catcher, former White Sox, Cub, Angel, Ray
- David Price, pitcher, Los Angeles Dodgers, former 1st round draft pick (1st overall, 2007, Rays)
- Mark Prior, pitcher, Second Team Freshman All-American (1999)
- Bryan Reynolds, outfielder Pittsburgh Pirates, former 2nd round draft pick (2016, Giants)
- Antoan Richardson, former Atlanta Brave, New York Yankee
- Kumar Rocker, pitcher, 1st round draft pick (10th overall, 2021, New York Mets, 3rd overall, 2022, Texas Rangers)
- Scott Sanderson, pitcher
- Reid Schaller, pitcher, former 3rd round draft pick (2018, Nationals)
- Jordan Sheffield, pitcher, former 1st round draft pick (36th overall, 2016, Dodgers)
- Jeremy Sowers, pitcher, former 1st round draft pick (6th overall, 2004, Indians)
- Dansby Swanson, infielder, Chicago Cubs former 1st round pick (1st overall, 2015, D-Backs)
- Will Toffey, infielder, Philadelphia Phillies
- Drew VerHagen, pitcher, Detroit Tigers
- Casey Weathers, pitcher, former 1st round pick (8th overall, 2007, Rockies)
- Rhett Wiseman, outfielder, former 3rd round draft pick (2015, Nationals)
- Kyle Wright, pitcher, former 1st round pick (5th overall, 2017, Braves)
- Mike Yastrzemski, outfielder San Francisco Giants, former 14th round draft pick (2013, Orioles)
- Josh Zeid, pitcher, former Houston Astro
- Kevin Ziomek, pitcher, former 2nd round draft pick (2013, Tigers)

== See also ==
- List of NCAA Division I baseball programs
- 2008 Vanderbilt Commodores baseball team
