= Southern Ohio Copperheads =

- Logo

Information
- League: Great Lakes Summer Collegiate League (South)
- Location: Athens, Ohio
- Ballpark: Bob Wren Stadium
- Founded: 2002
- League championships: 2018
- Colors: Green, Gold, and Orange
- Mascot: Homer
- General manager: Nicholas Medvitz
- Manager: Kali Osborne
- Website: copperheadbaseball.com

The Southern Ohio Copperheads is a community-owned, student-operated collegiate summer baseball team based in Athens, Ohio. The team is a member of the Great Lakes Summer Collegiate League (GLSCL), one the leagues in the National Alliance of College Summer Baseball (NACSB). In 2018, Southern Ohio won its first and only GLSCL Championship in franchise history.

The Copperheads play their home games at Bob Wren Stadium, which is also the home ballpark of the Ohio Bobcats baseball team. The current executive director is Jake Lietzow , the General Manager of the Copperheads is Nicholas Medvitz , and the head coach of the Copperheads is Rocky Brunty.

== History ==
=== Early Roots ===
The inception of the Southern Ohio Copperheads baseball team began in the spring of 2002, with a conversation between two Ohio University officials (Dr. Andy Kreutzer, director of the sports administration program at Ohio University and Alan Geiger, assistant to the president of Ohio University)

They discussed summer in Athens and about affordable, family entertainment. Their conversation drifted to other university officials and civic leaders looking for activities in the summer and the idea of a baseball team was conceived. Joe Carbone, head baseball coach Ohio University, recommended the Great Lakes Summer Collegiate League because it was coming to town for a weekend in the summer of 2001.

Bob Wren Stadium, played host to an exhibition game between Team USA and the Great Lakes League All-Stars on July 15, 2001. This game was attended by nearly 1,000 people. Following the game, Dr. Kreutzer stated, “We received a lot of really positive feedback from the all-star game and the success led us to believe that Southern Ohio would support a team".

The baseball team initially grew through phone calls and recruitment. John Wharton, former Chairman of the Copperheads Board of Directors, was recruited because of his ties to Ohio University baseball. He was a major fundraiser for the Bobcats, and was considered to be a supporter of the new initiative for summer baseball in Athens.

Dave Palmer, former team general manager and owner of local radio station WXTQ/WATH, wasn't involved originally, but following the exhibition game he became convinced that a baseball team in Athens was a viable idea. "The summer months here are slower paced and more relaxed," Palmer said. "I saw this as an opportunity to bring an athletic event to the summer months that will really enrich the region's life".

The group came together formally at the end of the summer of 2001 and created an organizational structure. The non-profit organization listed three goals for the team:

- Providing family entertainment in southern Ohio,
- offering a great opportunity for collegiate players to develop and improve their skill levels, and;
- creating a laboratory learning environment for students at Ohio University.

They gained acceptance into the Great Lakes League as a new franchise in September 2001. Following acceptance from the league, the board had just over nine months to make baseball in Athens a reality. A group of eight students, which included three sports administration students, worked closely with the board for eight weeks and produced a business plan.

The team named Scott Googins, then an assistant coach of the Miami Redhawks baseball team, as its first head coach. The Board of Directors organized a contest to name the team and the Copperheads was chosen as the team's name. Local artist Tad Gallaugher created the logo for the team.

Under the guidance of the board, several sports administration students were engaged to assist with the management of the organization. These students were entrusted with tasks ranging from procuring sponsorships to ticket sales, among other responsibilities. Notably, Nathan Kievman, a second-year graduate student in sports administration, assumed the role of Assistant General Manager. Additionally, two first-year students, Steve Frohwerk and Chris Boggs, were designated Assistant Managers, overseeing Operations and Merchandise and Concessions, respectively.

=== Inaugural Season ===
Under the leadership of Coach Googins, the newly formed team first took the field on June 12, 2002, against the now-defunct Youngstown Express. The team lost 6-4 and followed up with another loss to the Pittsburgh Pandas. The Copperheads played their first home game at Bob Wren Stadium on June 15, 2002, in a doubleheader against the Delaware Cows, losing both games by scores of 4-2 and 14-3. On June 16, the team won their first match with a 7–6 victory over the Northern Ohio Baseball Club. The Copperheads ended with an 18-22 record, finishing in seventh place out of ten clubs. Five future professional players suited up for the 2002 Copperheads, including White Sox pitch Adam Russell.

=== 2003-2006: New Additions ===
The 2003 Copperheads were coached by University of Dayton Assistant Coach Todd Linklater. Paced by Ohio University player Anthony Gressick and his .353 batting average, the team finished with a 19–20 record and made the league playoffs for the first time. This team featured 9 future professional players. The 2003 season was the team's best record until 2006.

In 2004, the Copperheads also featured 9 future professional players but struggled throughout the season with a 16–23 record. Despite finishing the season with a 5-game winning streak, the team missed the playoffs and finished in eighth place out of nine teams. Coached by University of Kentucky assistant Brad Bohannon, the squad was led by minor league players Ryan Norwood, Victor Alvarez, and Joe Mihalics.

The worst record in Copperheads’ franchise history was the 2005 season. Under the direction of Ohio University assistant Andrew See, the team recorded a 17-25 finish that placed them seventh out of eight league teams. Featuring five future professionals, the squad was led by Ohio University star and Cincinnati Reds minor leaguer Matt Stiffler.

For the 2006 season, Winthrop University assistant coach Stas Swerdzewski brought in a group of players and coaches that led the team to its first winning record and a league playoff appearance. The Copperheads would go on to post a 21–19 record and produced four professional players. The team once again was paced by Ohio University star Matt Stiffler, and also enjoyed the services of Appalachian State pitcher David Rubenstein.

=== 2007: A Near Miss ===
The Copperheads’ 2007 squad was led by Marietta College assistant coach Mike Deegan, and finished 23-15, which resulted in sixth place out of eleven league teams. For the third year in a row, Ohio University outfielder Matt Stiffler led the team in hitting, while John Karr and Chuck Boring paced the Copperheads’ pitchers. The team ultimately advanced to the Great Lakes Summer Collegiate League playoffs, winning its first two games over the Lima Locos and the Cincinnati Steam. A loss to eventual champion Columbus forced the Copperheads into a must-win game over the Delaware Cows, which they lost 9-8.

=== 2008: A Year of Promise and Disappointment ===
Shawnee State University head coach Ted Tom led the team along with assistants Andrew Engebretson and Chris Moore. Featuring Northwestern University outfielder Jake Goebbert, the University of North Carolina at Asheville slugger Phillip Vaughn, and Ohio University pitcher Joe Stover, the squad started out the season strong. The Copperheads posted a 5-1 mark in their first six games but faltered into a 7-game losing streak in early July. Coach Tom's team then posted a seven-game winning streak in late July to force their way back into playoff contention. Needing to win one game of an August 3 doubleheader against Lima Locos to enter the GLSCL playoffs, the Copperheads stumbled in both games to finish the season with a 19–21 record. Though tied for the sixth and final playoff berth, the squad lost the tiebreaker to Lake Erie by losing the season series 3-1.

=== 2009-2010: The Florak Era ===
On October 30, 2008, Mike Florak was named the eighth manager of the Southern Ohio Copperheads. Florak coached the Youngstown State Penguins baseball team for nine years, leading the team to their first Horizon League title and NCAA Tournament appearance in 2004.

The Copperheads' finished the regular season with an 18-16 record, including a season sweep of the Xenia Scouts and a 3–1 record against the league-leading Lima Locos. The Copperheads featured pitching led by Northwestern University pitcher Dave Jensen. Jensen set the Great Lakes Summer Collegiate League ERA record, posting just a 0.30 ERA in 30.1 innings pitched. In the bullpen, the team featured Marion Military Institute closer Jordan Langley and Marshall University set-up man Tyler Gatrell. The offense was led by Ohio University outfielder Jerod Yakubik, Southeast Missouri State infielder Trent Moses, and Sinclair Community College utilityman Justin Marerro.

The Copperheads' first season under Florak featured a run in the Great Lakes Summer Collegiate League Playoffs. The Copperheads defeated Licking County and Grand Lake to advance to their first-ever GLSCL title game. The team fell 4-2 to Cincinnati Steam in a battle for the championship, finishing with a season record of 20-18.

On August 12, 2009, it was reported by Athens radio station WATH that Mike Florak and assistants Chris Moore and Tim Culver would all return for the 2010 season. The 2010 Copperheads finished third in the league with a 24–16 record, narrowly missing the playoffs.

=== 2011-2017: New Heights ===
For the 2011 season, Chris Moore, an assistant at Shawnee State University was brought on as manager. The 2011 Copperheads were the best team in franchise history, finishing atop the GLSCL standings with a 29–13 record. Despite the record-setting regular season, the team was unable to advance to the playoffs.

Moore returned in 2012 and led the team to a 22–17 record and a second consecutive playoff appearance, again ending in a first-round loss. The 2012 edition of the Copperheads were powered by catcher Blaise Salter who batted .319 and led the club with 7 home runs and 26 RBI. Justin Brantley led the pitching staff with 32.1 IP and a 5–1 record as a starter. 2012 would be Moore's last season in Athens, finishing his Copperheads career with a record of 55-34.

Jonathan Nichols, an assistant under Florak and Moore, took the reins in 2013 and extended the Copperheads' winning tradition. Jesse Puscheck was an finished the season with a .321 average and 44 RBI. Jordan Peterson, Alex Winkleman, and Eddie Fitzpatrick combined for 83 strikeouts and a 12–4 record. The team again finished first in the GLSCL standings but was upset by the Lima Locos in the first round of the playoffs.

The team would rebound in 2014 under Nichols, making the playoffs for the fourth straight season at 23-16. A balanced offense in which no player hit more than 3 home runs or 22 RBI and a pitching staff led by Brandyn Sittinger and Jake Miller took the Copperheads to the league championship series for the second time, and first since 2009. The Copperheads swept the Xenia Scouts in the league semifinals before falling to the Licking County Settlers in the finals.

For the 2015 season, Nichols again returned as manager along with veteran copperheads Brett Impemba, Roscoe Blackburn, Grant Wruble, and Eddie Fitzpatrick. The team was led by Ohio University's Connor Callery, who batted .359 and was named 2nd Team All-GLSCL. Callery was joined by ace pitcher Andrew Gonzalez and reliever Zach Moore on the All-League team. Trent Astle was named a GLSCL All-Star and had a bare-handed grab featured on ESPN's "Top 10 Plays." The Copperheads finished 4th in the league at 22-17 (unable to finish the final game due to rain) and fell in a one-game playoff to the Licking County Settlers.

Phil Butler took over from Nichols in 2016, going 20-22 in his first season. The Copperheads missed the GLSCL playoffs for the first time in seven years in Butler's first season. In his second year at the helm, the Copperheads went 31-10 on their way to winning their first and only GLSCL Championship. Butler would end his career at 59-28 record.

=== 2018: GLSCL Champions ===
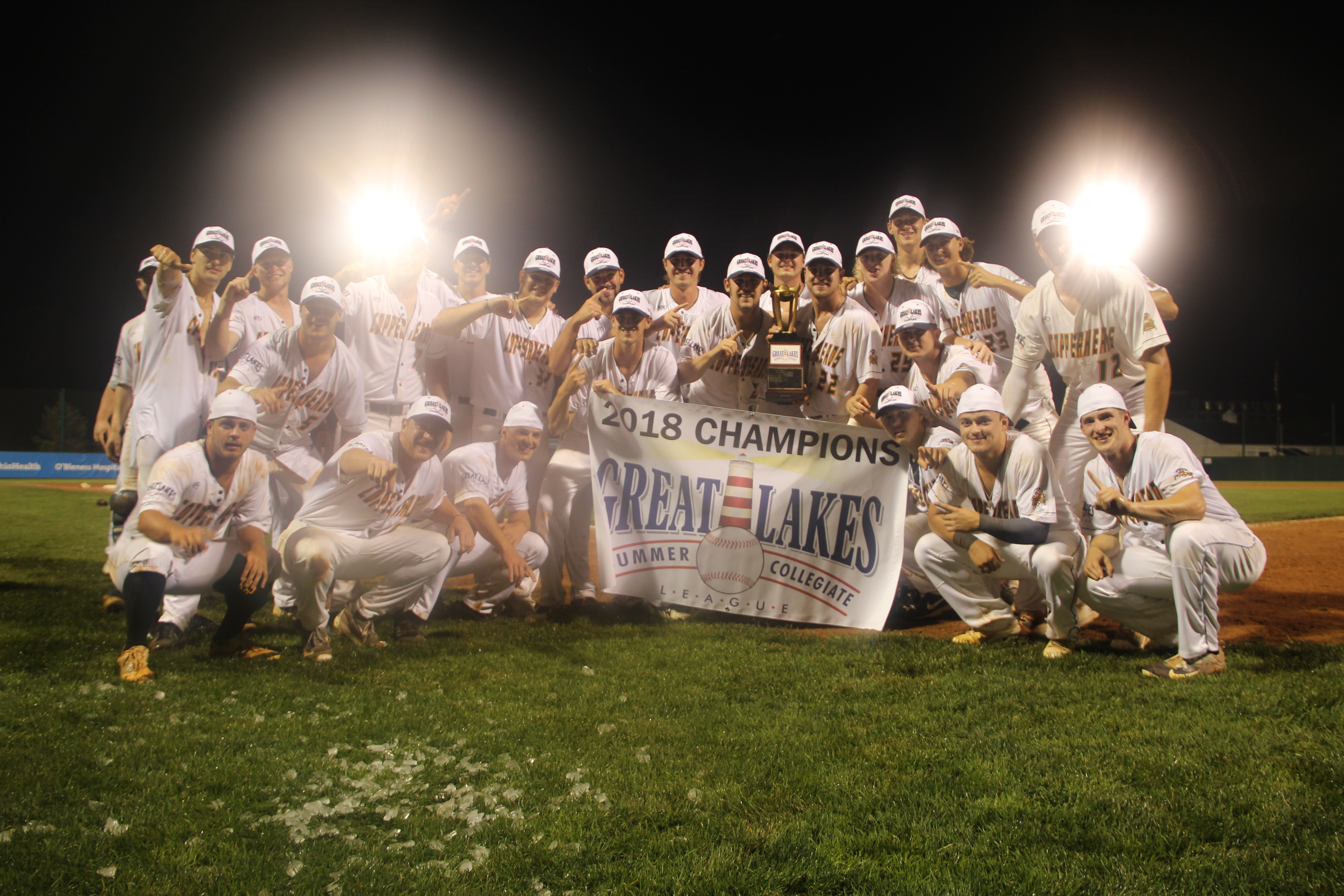
The 2018 Southern Ohio Copperheads.

The Copperheads capped off a historic season by bringing the first GLSCL Championship to Southern Ohio. Highlighted by a franchise record of 31 regular season wins, the Copperheads, under the reign of GLSCL Coach of the Year Phil Butler, finished first in the Southern Division. With the leadership of returning players Ty Suntken of Bowling Green State University and 2018 GLSCL Most Valuable Player Blaine Crim of Mississippi College, the Copperheads swept both the Hamilton Joes and Saginaw Sugar Beets en route to claiming the league title on August 8, 2018.

At the conclusion of the 2018 season, seven Copperheads were presented with First Team GLSCL Honors: Michael Darrell-Hicks of Western Kentucky University, Gus Cunningham of Florida Southwestern State College, Blaine Crim of Mississippi College, Blake Holub of St. Edward's University, Joe Stewart of Michigan State University, Austin Weaver of St. Edward's University, and Thomas Zazzaro of Lee University. Zazzaro was also awarded the 2018 GLSCL All-Star Game MVP at the GLSCL All-Star Game on July 17, 2018.

=== 2019: Dunfee Era ===
Austin Dunfee, a Pomeroy, Ohio native who played and coached for the Southern Ohio Copperheads for over 6 years, took on the role of head coach for the 2019 GLSCL Season.

Dunfee graduated from Shawnee State University in 2013 with a Sports Management degree. He played his first season for the Copperheads in 2011. After graduating, Dunfee went on to work as an assistant coach for both the Copperheads and the Shawnee State Bears. Dunfee ended his 2011 season playing for the Copperheads with a 0.48 earned run average. He still holds the Shawnee State University records for career wins (27), strikeouts in a season (82), and complete games in a season (13). During his time playing for the Bears, the team brought home one conference title and one championship title.

Dunfee stated that his goals for the 2019 season included winning another championship and developing his players' experience and skills for their return to their respective schools.

The Copperheads finished the regular season 23-18 but missed the playoffs.

=== 2020/2021: Covid-19 Cancellations ===
On May 20, 2020, the GLSCL official announced the cancellation of the 2020 season.

On 22 February 2021, while the Great Lakes Summer Collegiate League returned for the 2021 season the Southern Ohio Copperheads announced that they will not be playing in 2021 due to the ongoing pandemic and for the long-term financial success of the franchise.

In the summer of 2021, without baseball, the Copperheads went back into the communities of Southeast Ohio. They held youth camps throughout the local area and each athlete got meet the Copperheads students and staff while improving their skills. In July they held the first annual Copperheads Community Cup.

=== 2022: The Return Of Baseball To Athens ===
After not being able to play ball for the past two years due to the COVID-19 pandemic. The Copperheads returned in 2022 under second-year head coach TJ Lanning of Montreat College. The Copperheads would finish the season 15-23 overall and finish last in the GLSCL. Despite the poor overall record, the Copperheads set new records, including by GLSCL Offense Player of the year in Kyle Ratliff of SIU Edwardsville who would go on to beat the franchise home runs record and reset it at 11. Carson Shepard of Ohio University would set the Hit by Pitch record which now sits at 13.

In the first home game, referred to as "The Return", the Copperheads won on a walk-off sac fly by Joshua Steidl scoring Ian Krump.

The team celebrated their 20th-anniversary game which included inviting back former key figures who got the Copperheads started to be recognized and celebrated. The Copperheads also held an international night which involved having student groups from Brazil at the game. The Copperheads held a game where they invited the Ohio University Marching 110 to come and perform.

The Southern Ohio Copperheads partnered with Turn It Gold (TIG), a non-profit organization that raises awareness with families impacted by childhood cancers. This included the help of local business Precision Imprints, which made custom gold uniforms for the Copperheads players and staff, along with Passion Works Studio who help decorate the stadium. The Copperheads won the game 14-3 over Grand Lake Mariners when Kyle Ratliff hit a walk-off game-ending grand slam.

Off the field, the Copperheads staff of Ohio University students had the challenge of reuniting a community of a team that had been the lifeline of town in the summer times which was gone the previous two summers without a local baseball team to cheer for. The Copperheads staff put together a marketing plan to reunite the community with their local team. The Copperheads led the league in attendance for the season. The staff also held community events such as tabling at local events such as little league games and local farmers markets, along with reading days, baseball camps, and pool days.

The 2022 team and staff were recognized by the Athens Area Chamber of Commerce as the 2022 winners of the Community Support Award, which was created in 2014 to honor a business or individual who exemplifies community by going above and beyond to support the Athens Area for a variety of causes in the area.

=== 2023: Shiver Era ===
On September 28, 2022, the Copperheads announced that Jonathon Shiver, a 27-year-old native of Jacksonville, Florida would be at the helm of snake baseball for the next summer. Shiver was at the time the Hitting Coach / Transfer Recruiter for Olivet Nazarene University, a private institution in Illinois that competes in NAIA.

Shiver himself was a collegiate baseball player, having played at Lander University for one year, and Trinity Baptist for four years.

Shiver stated, “I think summer ball is a great time for players to relax, have fun and really work on their game. It is the perfect environment to just enjoy baseball and be a college athlete. I want to help kids who need to develop but also make it to where the kids show up every day knowing they’re going to enjoy the day.”

2024-2025 Brunty Era

Under the helm of a new coaching staff, Rocky Brunty is The Copperheads head coach.

== Season Records ==
(Finish in Great Lakes Summer Collegiate League)

- 2002: 18-22 (7th), manager Scott Googins
- 2003: 19-20 (6th), manager Todd Linklater
- 2004: 16-23 (8th), manager Brad Bohannon
- 2005: 17-25 (7th), manager Andrew See
- 2006: 20-19 (6th), manager Stas Swerdzewski
- 2007: 23-15 (6th), manager Mike Deegan
- 2008: 19-21 (T-6th),manager Ted Tom
- 2009: 20-18 (5th), manager Mike Florak
- 2010: 24-16 (3rd), manager Mike Florak
- 2011: 29-13 (1st), manager Chris Moore
- 2012: 22-17 (4th), manager Chris Moore
- 2013: 25-15 (1st), manager Jonathan Nichols
- 2014: 23-16 (2nd), manager Jonathan Nichols
- 2015: 22-17 (4th), manager Jonathan Nichols
- 2016: 20-22 (5th), manager Phil Butler
- 2017: 24-17 (2nd), manager Phil Butler
- 2018: 35-10 (1st), manager Phil Butler
- 2019: 23-18 (3rd), manager Austin Dunfee
- 2020: NO SEASON COVID-19 pandemic
- 2021: NO SEASON COVID-19 pandemic, manager TJ Lanning
- 2022: 15-23 (7th), manager TJ Lanning
- 2023: TBD (TBD), manager Jonathon Shiver

Totals: 414-348 (.543)

== GLSCL Playoff Appearances ==
- 2002
- 2004
- 2006
- 2007
- 2009 - GLSCL Runner-Up
- 2010
- 2011
- 2012
- 2013
- 2014 - GLSCL Runner-up
- 2015
- 2017
- 2018 - GLSCL Champions

Playoff Appearances: 13

== Major League Draft Picks ==
2002:

- Chad Liter (Colorado Rockies)

2003:

- Jeff Opalewski (Cleveland Indians)
- Jesse Collins (Minnesota Twins)
- Jim Gulden (Montreal Expos)
- Kevin House (Cincinnati Reds)
- Seth Bynum (Montreal Expos)
- Walt Novosel (Arizona Diamondbacks)

2004:

- Adam Russell (Chicago White Sox)
- Rip Warren (New York Mets)
- Ryan Norwood (Chicago Cubs)
- Victor Alvarez (Pittsburgh Pirates)

2005:

- Ben Crabtree (Texas Rangers)
- Ben Rulon (Tampa Bay Rays)
- Corby Heckman (Seattle Mariners)
- Eric Butler (Arizona Diamondbacks)
- Joe Mihalics (New York Mets)

2006

- Anthony Gressick (Cincinnati Reds)
- Dan Pfau (Washington Nationals)
- Victor Alvarez (Pittsburgh Pirates)
- Rob Harmon (Seattle Mariners)
- Paul Bennett (Atlanta Braves)

2007

- Dominique Rodgers (Minnesota Twins)
- Joey Newby (Oakland Athletics)
- Mike Folli (St. Louis Cardinals)

2008:

- David Rubenstein (Pittsburgh Pirates)
- Jason Rook (Baltimore Orioles)
- Jordan Alvis (Seattle Mariners)
- Matt Stiffler (Cincinnati Reds)
- Ryan Peisel (Colorado Rockies)
- Tony Campana (Chicago Cubs)

2011:

- John Pedrotty (Arizona Diamondbacks)
- Ryan Rua (Texas Rangers)

2012:

- Cameron Flynn (Florida Marlins)
- David Starn (Atlanta Braves)
- Ryan Jones (San Francisco Giants)
- Seth Streich (Oakland Athletics)

2013:

- Andrew Waszak (Atlanta Braves)
- David Garner (Chicago Cubs)
- Luis Pollorena (Texas Rangers)
- Mike Fish (Los Angeles Angels)

2014:

- Joel Fisher (Philadelphia Phillies)

2015:

- Alex Winkleman (Houston Astros)
- Anthony Misiewicz (Seattle Mariners)
- Blaise Salter (Detroit Tigers)
- Cam Vieaux (Detroit Tigers)
- Josh Roeder (New York Yankees)
- Reece Karalus (Tampa Bay Rays)

2017:

- Greg Jacknewitz (San Francisco Giants)

2018:

- Lee Solomon (San Diego Padres)

2019:

- Aaron Ochsenbein (Los Angeles Angels)
- Blaine Crim (Texas Rangers)
