= J. Page Hayden Field =

Baseball venue in Cincinnati, Ohio

- Hayden Field
- Interactive map of J. Page Hayden Field
- Location: Victory Parkway and Dana Avenue, Cincinnati, Ohio, USA
- Coordinates: 39.150244°N 84.47676°W
- Owner: Xavier University
- Operator: Xavier University
- Capacity: 500
- Surface: Artificial turf
- Scoreboard: Electronic
- Field size: Left Field: 310 feet (94 m); Center Field: 380 feet (120 m); Right Field: 310 feet (94 m)

Construction
- Opened: 1920s
- Renovated: 1935, 1982, 2010, 2022

Tenants
- Xavier Musketeers baseball (NCAA D1 Big East) (1920s–present); Cincinnati Steam (GLSCL) (2006–present)

J. Page Hayden Field is a baseball venue in Cincinnati, Ohio, United States. It is home to the Xavier Musketeers baseball team of the NCAA Division I Big East. Since 2006, the Cincinnati Steam of the collegiate summer Great Lakes Summer Collegiate League have also used Hayden Field. The facility was dedicated in 1982 for J. Page Hayden, under whose name a donation for the field's renovation was made. It has a capacity of 500 spectators.

== History ==
Xavier began playing at the location in the 1920s. In 1935, the field's dimensions were adjusted with the construction of the O'Connor Sports Center beyond the right center field fence. The field was renovated again in 1982 because of a donation made under the name of J. Page Hayden (1898–1979), the field's namesake. Following the 2010 season, a new playing surface, brick backstop, and dugouts were added.

From 1980–2013, Xavier baseball has a 450-307-3 overall record at the field.

== See also ==
- List of NCAA Division I baseball venues
