= Hamilton Joes =

- Logo

Information
- League: Great Lakes Summer Collegiate League
- Location: Hamilton, Ohio
- Ballpark: Foundation Field
- Founded: 2009
- Nickname: Joes
- League championships: 2010, 2016, 2021, 2022, 2024
- Colors: Red, black, yellow
- General manager: Darrel Grissom
- Manager: Aaron Brill
- Media: Hamilton Journal News
- Website: hamiltonjoes.com

The Hamilton Joes are a collegiate summer baseball team that competes in the Great Lakes Summer Collegiate League (GLSCL), one of eight leagues formed under the National Alliance of College Summer Baseball (NACSB). The team plays at Foundation Field in Hamilton, Ohio.

== History ==
The Hamilton Joes were founded in 2008 as a non-profit organization by their then President/GM, Hamilton native Mike Brennan, along with their manager/head coach, Darrel Grissom. The team's namesake is Joe Nuxhall, a Hamilton native and Cincinnati Reds pitcher who is a member of the team's hall of fame. The team played its first season in the Great Lakes League in 2009.

In March 2011, Brennan resigned from his positions and named assistant general manager Joshua Manley as his successor. The following year, Manley carried his coaching duties over from the collegiate spring season to the collegiate summer season. Manley took over as vice president and general manager of the team while Darrel Grissom was promoted to president and remained Director of Baseball Operations. Manley left the team before the 2014 season. Following Manley’s departure, John Dotson served as assistant GM from 2015-2016. In August 2016, Ryan Finnerty was promoted to assistant GM and still serves in that role today.

== Playoff history ==
In only their second season in operation and their first playoff appearance, the Joes won the 2010 league championship. The Joes entered the playoffs as the No. 2 seed, and defeated the Southern Ohio Copperheads in two games (of a best-of-three series). In the Championship Series, the Joes faced the No. 1 seeded Licking County Settlers and also defeated them in two games, capturing the franchise's first championship. In 2015, they again advanced to the championship round but lost to the Lima Locos, though they would defeat Lima the following year, 2016, for their second championship. The Joes would also win back-to-back championships in 2021 and 2022, defeating Lima both times. Their most recent championship came in 2024 when they beat the Muskegon Clippers, going 4-0 during the postseason.

== Season records ==
Records
Season	Wins	Losses	Pct	Playoffs
2009	12	23	.343	Did not make playoffs
2010	25	15	.625	Won championship
2011	24	18	.571	Lost first round
2012	13	26	.333	Did not make playoffs
2013	17	23	.425	Did not make playoffs
2014	19	21	.475	Lost first round
2015	24	11	.686	Lost championship
2016	27	15	.643	Won championship
2017	14	26	.350	Did not make playoffs
2018	22	20	.524	Lost second round
2019	22	18	.550	Did not make playoffs
2020	0	0	.000	Season not played due to COVID-19
2021	27	15	.643	Won championship
2022	21	17	.553	Won championship
2023	21	17	.553	Lost first round
2024	26	9	.743	Won championship
2025	23	18	.561	Lost championship
All-Time	337	292	.536	Reached playoffs 11 times Won 5 championships (2010, 2016, 2021, 2022, 2024)

== Roster ==
Hamilton Joes roster
Players	Coaches/Other
Pitchers: 8 Kyle Binder; 39 Hudson Boring; 4 Dean Brown; 21 Joey Buchanan; 7 Caden Clark; 5 Braylon Connell; 29 Charlie Dieruf; 34 Caleb Driessen; 36 Dale Ellis; 26 Sam Eppley; 41 Alexander Gay; 30 Noah Kubasky; 28 Jeffrey Levin; 27 Jacob Murphy; 31 Cameron Novak; 6 Erik Ronquist; 33 Samuel Rufenacht; 23 Carter Sellars; 38 Connor Schwalbach; 22 Eli Wagner; Catchers: 18 Gavin Brewer; 11 Alec Halter; 13 Owen McKoon; Infielders: 14 Brady Bowen; 9 Ryder Kirtley; 19 Alex Koelling; 30 Noah Kubasky; 1 Noah Wagster; 15 Ben Winge; 9 Preston Zumwalt; Outfielders: 17 AJ Beggs; 20 Ashton Bennight; 18 Gavin Brewer; 10 Parker Falkenstein; 12 AJ Gundler; 30 Noah Kubasky; 3 Kamden McAlpin	Manager: -- Davis Schaefer; Coaches: -- Brandon Anderson (assistant coach); -- Colby Gardner (assistant coach); -- Rory Tekulve (assistant coach); 7-day injured list; ~ Development list; # Rehab assignment; ∞ Reserve list; ‡ Restricted list; § Suspended list; † Temporarily inactive list; Roster updated June 05, 2026; → More rosters: MiLB • Great Lakes Summer Collegiate League

== Joes in the Pros ==
Eighty-five Joes have played professionally, including eight who have made it to the major leagues:

- Matt Marksberry (Atlanta Braves)
- Ian Miller (Minnesota Twins, Chicago Cubs)
- Hunter Owen (Pittsburgh Pirates)
- Ryan Rua (Texas Rangers)
- Erik Swanson (Seattle Mariners, Toronto Blue Jays)
- Brent Suter (Milwaukee Brewers, Colorado Rockies, Cincinnati Reds, Los Angeles Angels)
- J.B. Wendelken (Oakland Athletics, Arizona Diamondbacks)
- Andrew Young (Arizona Diamondbacks)
