= Anderson Servants =

The Anderson Servants were an amateur baseball team that competed in the Great Lakes Summer Collegiate League (GLSCL), one of eight leagues formed under the National Alliance of College Summer Baseball (NACSB). They played their home games at Memorial Field in Anderson. Indiana, until the team ceased play in 2009.
