= Alabama Crimson Tide baseball =

American college baseball team

Alabama Crimson Tide
- 2026 Alabama Crimson Tide baseball team
- Founded: 1892 (133 years ago)
- Overall record: 2,879–1,794–25 (.615)
- University: University of Alabama
- Athletic director: Greg Byrne
- Head coach: Rob Vaughn (3rd season)
- Conference: SEC
- Location: Tuscaloosa, Alabama
- Home stadium: Sewell–Thomas Stadium (capacity: 5,867)
- Nickname: Crimson Tide
- Colors: Crimson and white

College World Series runner-up
- 1983, 1997

College World Series appearances
- 1950, 1983, 1996, 1997, 1999, 2026

NCAA regional champions
- 1950, 1983, 1996, 1997, 1999, 2006, 2010, 2023, 2026

NCAA tournament appearances
- 1947, 1948, 1950, 1955, 1968, 1983, 1986, 1991, 1995, 1996, 1997, 1998, 1999, 2000, 2002, 2003, 2005, 2006, 2008, 2009, 2010, 2011, 2013, 2014, 2021, 2023, 2024, 2025, 2026

Conference tournament champions
- 1983, 1995, 1996, 1997, 1999, 2002, 2003

Conference regular season champions
- SIAA: 1903, 1909, 1913, 1915, 1917, 1918, 1919, 1920, SoCon: 1924, 1925, 1930, 1932; SEC: 1934, 1935, 1936, 1938, 1940, 1941, 1942, 1947, 1950, 1955, 1968, 1983, 1996, 2006

The Alabama Crimson Tide baseball team represents the University of Alabama in NCAA Division I college baseball. Along with most other Alabama athletic teams, the baseball team participates in the Southeastern Conference. The team plays its home games on campus at Sewell–Thomas Stadium.

== History ==
The Crimson Tide baseball team leads the SEC in all-time wins with 2,879 victories. The program trails only LSU for the most SEC regular season titles with 14 and 7 tournament championships. Tide baseball teams have participated in the NCAA College World Series five times (1950, 1983, 1996, 1997, 1999), finishing second in 1983 and 1997. The Crimson Tide have also had over 74 players make it to the major leagues, 2nd most in the SEC just behind Arkansas with 70 players.

== Stadium ==
The team's home venue is Sewell-Thomas Stadium, located in Tuscaloosa, Alabama on the campus of the University of Alabama. A tradition at Sewell-Thomas Stadium is to play the Rednex song "Cotton-Eyed Joe" during the after the 7th inning. Sewell-Thomas Stadium is nicknamed "The Joe" by Crimson Tide fans, in honor of Baseball Hall of Fame member Joe Sewell, who played college baseball at Alabama. When Sewell played for Alabama, they were not in the Southeastern Conference. This means that only Frank Thomas, of Auburn, is the only SEC player to make the Baseball HOF. For 12 of the last 13 seasons Alabama has ranked in the top 10 nationally in attendance.

In 2016 the team moved into the newly renovated Sewell-Thomas Stadium, a $42 million renovation making The Joe look like a totally new ball park. Club rooms, a kids playground, all chairback seats, and a new state of the art scoreboard were added.

== Head coaches ==
Records are through 2024 season

| Tenure | Coach | Years | Record | Pct. |
|---|---|---|---|---|
| 1892 | Shelby Fletcher | 1 | 1–0 | 1.000 |
| 1893 | W. M. Walker | 1 | 4–6–1 | .409 |
| 1894 | J. H. Lyons | 1 | 10–3 | .769 |
| 1895 | J. F. Jenkins | 1 | 9–3 | .750 |
| 1896 | Eli Abbott | 1 | 5–5 | .500 |
| 1897 | "Kid" Peeples | 1 | 10–0 | 1.000 |
| 1898 | Joseph Black | 1 | 2–3 | .400 |
| 1899 | F. C. Owen | 1 | 3–6 | .333 |
| 1900 | Ardis Smith | 1 | 9–3 | .750 |
| 1901–1905 | Thomas Stouch | 5 | 49–25–1 | .660 |
| 1906 | Charles Schwartz | 1 | 4–16–1 | .214 |
| 1907–1910 | J. W. H. Pollard | 4 | 66–22–1 | .747 |
| 1911 | Guy Lowman | 1 | 12–5 | .706 |
| 1912–1915 | D. V. Graves | 4 | 66–30–1 | .686 |
| 1916–1919 | B. L. Noojin | 4 | 55–18 | .753 |
| 1920 | Gordon W. Lewis | 1 | 15–2 | .882 |
| 1921–1923 | Charles Bernier | 3 | 28–35–4 | .448 |
| 1924–1927 | Wallace Wade | 4 | 61–32–2 | .653 |
| 1928 | Hank Crisp | 1 | 12–7–2 | .619 |
| 1929–1930 | Jess Neely | 2 | 28–15–2 | .644 |
| 1931–1932 | Sam Hinton | 2 | 23–7–2 | .750 |
| 1933–1934 | Jennings B. Whitworth | 2 | 21–11 | .656 |
| 1943 | Paul Burnham | 1 | 12–6 | .667 |
| 1946 | Dixie Howell | 1 | 13–7 | .650 |
| 1935–1942; 1947–1963 | Tilden Campbell | 25 | 355–168–4 | .677 |
| 1964–1969 | Joe Sewell | 6 | 106–79 | .573 |
| 1970–1979 | Hayden Riley | 10 | 236–206–1 | .533 |
| 1980–1994 | Barry Shollenberger | 15 | 487–334–1 | .593 |
| 1995–2009 | Jim Wells | 15 | 625–322 | .656 |
| 2010–2016 | Mitch Gaspard | 7 | 234–193 | .548 |
| 2017 | Greg Goff | 1 | 19–34–1 | .358 |
| 2018–2023 | Brad Bohannon | 6 | 166–122 | .576 |
| 2023 | Jason Jackson | 1 | 13–6 | .684 |
| 2024–present | Rob Vaughn | 3 | 114-61 | .651 |
| Totals | 34 coaches | 128 seasons | 2,879–1,794–25 | .615 |

Longest Tenure
| Rank | Name | Seasons |
|---|---|---|
| 1 | Tilden Campbell | 25 |
| 2 | Jim Wells | 15 |
| 2 | Barry Shollenberger | 15 |

Most Wins
| Rank | Name | Wins |
|---|---|---|
| 1 | Jim Wells | 625 |
| 2 | Barry Shollenberger | 487 |
| 3 | Tilden Campbell | 355 |

== Year-by-year results ==
| Year | Coach | Record | Notes |
|---|---|---|---|
| 1892 | Shelby Fletcher | 1–0 | |
| 1893 | W.M. Walker | 4–6–1 | |
| 1894 | J.H. Lyons | 10–3 | |
| 1895 | J.F. Jenkins | 9–3 | |
| 1896 | Eli Abbott | 5–5 | |
| 1897 | Kid Peeples | 10–0 | |
| 1898 | Joseph Black | 2–3 | |
| 1899 | F.C. Owen | 3–6 | |
| 1900 | Ardis Smith | 9–3 | |
| 1901 | Thomas Stouch | 9–3 | |
| 1902 | Thomas Stouch | 7–1 | |
| 1903 | Thomas Stouch | 15–3 | |
| 1904 | Thomas Stouch | 12–10 | |
| 1905 | Thomas Stouch | 6–8–1 | |
| 1906 | Charles Schwartz | 4–16–1 | |
| 1907 | J.W.H. Pollard | 21–7 | |
| 1908 | J.W.H. Pollard | 14–4 | |
| 1909 | J.W.H. Pollard | 19–3 | Southern Intercollegiate Athletic Association Champions |
| 1910 | J.W.H. Pollard | 12–8–1 | |
| 1911 | Guy S. Lowman | 12–5 | |
| 1912 | D.V. Graves | 16–6 | |
| 1913 | D.V. Graves | 22–7 | Southern Intercollegiate Athletic Association Champions |
| 1914 | D.V. Graves | 11–13 | |
| 1915 | D.V. Graves | 17–4–1 | Southern Intercollegiate Athletic Association Champions |
| 1916 | Loonie Noojin | 12–10 | |
| 1917 | Loonie Noojin | 14–2 | Southern Intercollegiate Athletic Association Champions |
| 1918 | Loonie Noojin | 13–4 | Southern Intercollegiate Athletic Association Champions |
| 1919 | Loonie Noojin | 16–2 | Southern Intercollegiate Athletic Association Champions |
| 1920 | Gordon Lewis | 15–2 | Southern Intercollegiate Athletic Association Champions |
| 1921 | Charles Bernier | 7–12–1 | |
| 1922 | Charles Bernier | 7–16–2 | |
| 1923 | Charles Bernier | 14–7–1 | |
| 1924 | Wallace Wade | 17–6 | Southern Conference champions |
| 1925 | Wallace Wade | 21–6 | |
| 1926 | Wallace Wade | 10–12–1 | |
| 1927 | Wallace Wade | 13–8–1 | |
| 1928 | Hank Crisp | 12–7–2 | |
| 1929 | Jess Neely | 11–8–2 | |
| 1930 | Jess Neely | 17–7 | Southern Conference champions |
| 1931 | Sam Hinton | 13–5–1 | |
| 1932 | Sam Hinton | 10–2–1 | Southern Conference champions |
| 1933 | J.B. Whitworth | 8–6 | |
| 1934 | J.B. Whitworth | 13–5 | Southeastern Conference champions |
| 1935 | Tilden Campbell | 12–2 | Southeastern Conference champions |
| 1936 | Tilden Campbell | 10–3–1 | Southeastern Conference champions |
| 1937 | Tilden Campbell | 12–4 | |
| 1938 | Tilden Campbell | 13–2 | Southeastern Conference champions |
| 1939 | Tilden Campbell | 10–10 | |
| 1940 | Tilden Campbell | 14–2 | Southeastern Conference champions |
| 1941 | Tilden Campbell | 19–2–1 | Southeastern Conference champions |
| 1942 | Tilden Campbell | 10–2 | Southeastern Conference champions |
| 1943 | Paul Burnham | 12–6 | |
1944–1945: No team due to World War II
| 1946 | Dixie Howell | 13–7 | |
| 1947 | Tilden Campbell | 20–7 | Southeastern Conference champions; NCAA District III playoffs |
| 1948 | Tilden Campbell | 18–11 | NCAA District III playoffs |
| 1949 | Tilden Campbell | 14–8 | |
| 1950 | Tilden Campbell | 22–12 | SEC Champions; NCAA District III Champions; 5th Place in 1950 College World Series |
| 1951 | Tilden Campbell | 17–5–1 | |
| 1952 | Tilden Campbell | 13–11 | |
| 1953 | Tilden Campbell | 10–9 | |
| 1954 | Tilden Campbell | 10–7 | |
| 1955 | Tilden Campbell | 23–6 | Southeastern Conference champions; NCAA District III playoffs |
| 1956 | Tilden Campbell | 18–7 | |
| 1957 | Tilden Campbell | 18–8 | SEC West Champions |
| 1958 | Tilden Campbell | 14–7 | SEC West Champions |
| 1959 | Tilden Campbell | 8–7 | |
| 1960 | Tilden Campbell | 11–7 | |
| 1961 | Tilden Campbell | 12–9 | |
| 1962 | Tilden Campbell | 16–10–1 | |
| 1963 | Tilden Campbell | 11–10 | |
| 1964 | Joe Sewell | 10–10 | |
| 1965 | Joe Sewell | 12–12 | |
| 1966 | Joe Sewell | 13–7 | |
| 1967 | Joe Sewell | 23–21 | |
| 1968 | Joe Sewell | 24–14 | Southeastern Conference champions; NCAA District III playoffs |
| 1969 | Joe Sewell | 10–22 | |
| 1970 | Hayden Riley | 19–25 | |
| 1971 | Hayden Riley | 21–14–1 | |
| 1972 | Hayden Riley | 22–14 | |
| 1973 | Hayden Riley | 22–14 | SEC Western Division Champions |
| 1974 | Hayden Riley | 37–16 | SEC Western Division Champions |
| 1975 | Hayden Riley | 34–32 | |
| 1976 | Hayden Riley | 25–18 | |
| 1977 | Hayden Riley | 27–18 | |
| 1978 | Hayden Riley | 23–20 | |
| 1979 | Hayden Riley | 18–27 | |
| 1980 | Barry Shollenberger | 18–28 | |
| 1981 | Barry Shollenberger | 41–15–1 | SEC Western Division Champions |
| 1982 | Barry Shollenberger | 32–21 | |
| 1983 | Barry Shollenberger | 46–11 | SEC Champions*, South Region Champs, 1983 College World Series Runners-Up |
| 1984 | Barry Shollenberger | 35–18 | |
| 1985 | Barry Shollenberger | 30–23 | |
| 1986 | Barry Shollenberger | 43–20 | NCAA Atlantic Region |
| 1987 | Barry Shollenberger | 25–26 | |
| 1988 | Barry Shollenberger | 27–26 | |
| 1989 | Barry Shollenberger | 32–24 | |
| 1990 | Barry Shollenberger | 34–21 | |
| 1991 | Barry Shollenberger | 42–20 | NCAA Atlantic Region |
| 1992 | Barry Shollenberger | 34–21 | |
| 1993 | Barry Shollenberger | 27–25 | |
| 1994 | Barry Shollenberger | 21–35 | |
| 1995 | Jim Wells | 42–23 | SEC Western Division Tourney Champion, NCAA East Region Runner-up |
| 1996 | Jim Wells | 50–19 | SEC Champions, SEC Tourney Champs, South I Regional Champions, 5th Place 1996 College World Series |
| 1997 | Jim Wells | 56–14 | SEC Tournament champions, NCAA South II Regional Champions, 1997 College World Series Runner-up |
| 1998 | Jim Wells | 46–18 | NCAA West Regional Runner-up |
| 1999 | Jim Wells | 53–16 | SEC Tournament champions, NCAA Regional Champions, Super Regional Champions, 4th place in the 1999 College World Series |
| 2000 | Jim Wells | 41–24 | NCAA Regional Runner-up |
| 2001 | Jim Wells | 32–23 | |
| 2002 | Jim Wells | 51–15 | SEC Western Division Champions, SEC Tournament champions, NCAA Tuscaloosa Regional Participant |
| 2003 | Jim Wells | 38–24 | SEC Tournament champions, NCAA College Station Regional Participant |
| 2004 | Jim Wells | 29–26 | |
| 2005 | Jim Wells | 40–23 | NCAA New Orleans Regional Runner up |
| 2006 | Jim Wells | 44–21 | SEC Champions, NCAA Tuscaloosa Regional Champions, NCAA Tuscaloosa Super Regional |
| 2007 | Jim Wells | 31–26 | |
| 2008 | Jim Wells | 35–28 | NCAA Conway Regional Participant |
| 2009 | Jim Wells | 37–21 | NCAA Clemson Regional Participant |
| 2010 | Mitch Gaspard | 42–25 | NCAA Atlanta Regional champions, NCAA Clemson Super Regional |
| 2011 | Mitch Gaspard | 35–28 | NCAA Tallahassee Regional Runner up |
| 2012 | Mitch Gaspard | 21–34 | |
| 2013 | Mitch Gaspard | 35–28 | NCAA Tallahassee Regional Participant |
| 2014 | Mitch Gaspard | 37–24 | NCAA Tallahassee Regional Runner up |
| 2015 | Mitch Gaspard | 32–28 | |
| 2016 | Mitch Gaspard | 32–26 | |
| 2017 | Greg Goff | 19–34–1 | |
| 2018 | Brad Bohannon | 27–29 | |
| 2019 | Brad Bohannon | 30–26 | |
| 2020 | Brad Bohannon | 16–1 | Postseason cancelled due to COVID-19 pandemic |
| 2021 | Brad Bohannon | 32–26 | NCAA Ruston Regional Participant |
| 2022 | Brad Bohannon | 31–27 | |
| 2023 | Brad Bohannon; Jason Jackson | 43–21 | NCAA Tuscaloosa Regional champions, NCAA Winston-Salem Super Regional |
| 2024 | Rob Vaughn | 33–24 | NCAA Tallahassee Regional Participant |
| 2025 | Rob Vaughn | 41–18 | NCAA Hattiesburg Regional Participant |
| 2026 | Rob Vaughn | 42–19 | College World Series |

* Alabama won the SEC tournament which determined the overall SEC champion from 1977 to 1987.

== Alabama in the NCAA tournament ==
The NCAA Division I baseball tournament started in 1947. The format of the tournament has changed through the years. The Crimson Tide has played in 29 NCAA tournaments, winning 9 NCAA Regional Championships. Alabama has five College World Series appearances and played in the national championship game in 1983 and 1997.

== Player awards ==
=== National awards ===
- Golden Spikes Award

Dave Magadan (1983)

- Baseball America College Player of the Year Award

Dave Magadan (1983)

- Johnny Bench Award

Jeremy Brown (2002)

- Baseball America Freshman of the Year Award

Wade LeBlanc (2004)

- Collegiate Baseball Freshman Player of the Year Award

Wade LeBlanc (2004)

- Senior CLASS Award

Emeel Salem (2007)

=== SEC awards ===
- Player of the Year Award

Kent Matthes (2009)

- Freshman of the Year Award

Wade LeBlanc (2004)

== Alabama's First Team All-Americans ==
| Player | Position | Year(s) | Selectors |
|---|---|---|---|
| Ed White | Outfield | 1950† | ABCA |
| Fred Frickie | First Base | 1957† | ABCA |
| Dave Magadan | First Base | 1983† | ABCA, BA |
| Doug Duke | Catcher | 1986† | ABCA, BA |
| Joe Vitiello | Outfield | 1991 | BA |
| Dax Norris | Catcher | 1996 | NCBWA |
| Roberto Vaz | Outfielder | 1997 | ABCA |
| Beau Hearod | Utility player | 2003 | NCBWA |
| Wade LeBlanc | Pitcher | 2006 | CB |
| Emeel Salem | Outfielder | 2006 | College Baseball Foundation |
| Kent Matthes | Outfielder | 2009† | ABCA, BA, CB, NCBWA |
| Taylor Dugas | Outfielder | 2010 | BA |
Source:"SEC All-Americas". secsports.com. Archived from the original on 2008-05-28. ABCA: American Baseball Coaches Association BA: Baseball America CB: Collegiate Baseball NCBWA: National Collegiate Baseball Writers Association † Denotes consensus All-American

== Former players ==
=== Current MLB players ===
| Player | Years at UA | MLB team |
|---|---|---|
| Chase Lee | 2019-2021 | Toronto Blue Jays |
| Dylan Smith | 2019-2021 | San Francisco Giants |
| Connor Prielipp | 2020-2021 | Minnesota Twins |
| Jim Jarvis | 2020-2023 | Atlanta Braves |

=== National College Baseball Hall of Fame inductees ===
In 2006, the National College Baseball Hall of Fame opened in Lubbock, Texas. Since then, Alabama has had 2 players inducted into the Hall of Fame.

| Player | Years at UA | Position | Year inducted |
|---|---|---|---|
| Joe Sewell | 1918–20 | SS | 2007 |
| Dave Magadan | 1981–83 | 3B | 2010 |

== Former Major Leaguers ==
| = All-Star | = Baseball Hall of Famer |

| Athlete | Years in MLB | MLB teams |
|---|---|---|
| Del Pratt | 1912–1924 | St. Louis Browns, New York Yankees, Boston Red Sox, Detroit Tigers |
| Dan Boone | 1919–1923 | Philadelphia Athletics, Detroit Tigers, Cleveland Indians |
| Lena Styles | 1919–1931 | Philadelphia Athletics, Cincinnati Reds |
| Joe Sewell | 1920–1933 | Cleveland Indians, New York Yankees |
| Riggs Stephenson | 1920–1933 | Cleveland Indians, Chicago Cubs |
| Frank Pratt | 1921 | Chicago White Sox |
| Luke Sewell | 1921–1942 | Cleveland Indians, Washington Senators, Chicago White Sox, St. Louis Browns |
| Ike Boone | 1922–1932 | New York Giants, Boston Red Sox, Chicago White Sox, Brooklyn Robins/Dodgers |
| Ernie Wingard | 1924–1927 | St. Louis Browns |
| Verdo Elmore | 1924 | St. Louis Browns |
| Andy Cohen | 1926, 1928–1929 | New York Giants |
| Tommy Sewell | 1927 | Chicago Cubs |
| Jackie Hayes | 1927–1940 | Washington Senators, Chicago White Sox |
| Grant Gillis | 1927–1929 | Washington Senators, Boston Red Sox |
| Red Barnes | 1927–1930 | Washington Senators, Chicago White Sox |
| Doc Land | 1929 | Washington Senators |
| Max Rosenfeld | 1931–1933 | Brooklyn Robins/Dodgers |
| Bruce Connatser | 1931–1932 | Cleveland Indians |
| Whitey Hilcher | 1931–1932, 1935–1936 | Cincinnati Reds |
| Ray Pepper | 1932–1936 | St. Louis Cardinals, St. Louis Browns |
| John Campbell | 1933 | Washington Senators |
| Syd Cohen | 1934, 1936–1937 | Washington Senators |
| Fred Sington | 1934–1939 | Washington Senators, Brooklyn Dodgers |
| Jim Sheehan | 1936 | New York Giants |
| Lee Rogers | 1938 | Boston Red Sox, Brooklyn Dodgers |
| Jim Tabor | 1938–1944, 1946–1947 | Boston Red Sox, Philadelphia Phillies |
| LeGrant Scott | 1939 | Philadelphia Phillies |
| Jack Bolling | 1939, 1944 | Philadelphia Phillies, Brooklyn Dodgers |
| Skeeter Scalzi | 1939 | New York Giants |
| Vic Bradford | 1943 | New York Giants |
| Ken Sears | 1943, 1946 | New York Yankees, St. Louis Browns |
| Jim Dunn | 1952 | Pittsburgh Pirates |
| Hersh Freeman | 1952–1953, 1955–1958 | Boston Red Sox, Cincinnati Redlegs, Chicago Cubs |
| John Baumgartner | 1953 | Detroit Tigers |
| Al Worthington | 1953–1954, 1956–1960, 1963–1969 | New York/San Francisco Giants, Boston Red Sox, Chicago White Sox, Cincinnati Reds, Minnesota Twins |
| Al Lary | 1954–1955, 1962 | Chicago Cubs |
| Frank Lary | 1954–1965 | Detroit Tigers, New York Mets, Milwaukee Brewers, Chicago White Sox |
| Guy Morton Jr. | 1952–1954 | Boston Red Sox |
| Ed White | 1955 | Chicago White Sox |
| Jack Kubiszyn | 1961–1962 | Cleveland Indians |
| Butch Hobson | 1975–1982 | Boston Red Sox, California Angels, New York Yankees |
| Bobby Sprowl | 1978–1981 | Boston Red Sox, Houston Astros |
| Randy Hunt | 1985–1986 | St. Louis Cardinals, Montreal Expos |
| Craig Shipley | 1986–1987, 1989, 1991–1998 | Los Angeles Dodgers, New York Mets, San Diego Padres, Houston Astros, Anaheim Angels |
| Bryan Kelly | 1986–1987 | Detroit Tigers |
| Dave Magadan | 1986–2001 | New York Mets, Florida Marlins, Seattle Mariners, Houston Astros, Chicago Cubs, Oakland Athletics, San Diego Padres |
| Greg Hibbard | 1989–1994 | Chicago White Sox, Chicago Cubs, Seattle Mariners |
| Mo Sanford | 1991, 1993, 1995 | Cincinnati Reds, Colorado Rockies, Minnesota Twins |
| Joe Vitiello | 1995–2000, 2003 | Kansas City Royals, San Diego Padres, Montreal Expos |
| Tim Young | 1998, 2000 | Montreal Expos, Boston Red Sox |
| Frank Menechino | 1999–2005 | Oakland Athletics, Toronto Blue Jays |
| Dustan Mohr | 2001–2007 | Minnesota Twins, San Francisco Giants, Colorado Rockies, Boston Red Sox, Tampa Bay Devil Rays |
| Lance Cormier | 2004–2011 | Arizona Diamondbacks, Atlanta Braves, Baltimore Orioles, Tampa Bay Rays, Los Angeles Dodgers |
| Paul Phillips | 2004–2010 | Kansas City Royals, Chicago White Sox, Colorado Rockies |
| Andy Phillips | 2004–2008 | New York Yankees, Cincinnati Reds, New York Mets |
| Taylor Tankersley | 2006–2008, 2010 | Florida Marlins |
| Jeremy Brown | 2006 | Oakland Athletics |
| David Robertson | 2008–2025 | New York Yankees, Chicago White Sox, Philadelphia Phillies, Tampa Bay Rays, New York Mets, Miami Marlins |
| Tommy Hunter | 2008–2023 | Texas Rangers, Baltimore Orioles, Chicago Cubs, Cleveland Indians, Tampa Bay Rays, Philadelphia Phillies, New York Mets |
| Wade LeBlanc | 2008–2014, 2016–2021 | San Diego Padres, Miami Marlins, Houston Astros, Los Angeles Angels of Anaheim, New York Yankees, Seattle Mariners, Pittsburgh Pirates, Baltimore Orioles, St. Louis Cardinals |
| Matt Downs | 2009–2012 | San Francisco Giants, Houston Astros |
| Alex Avila | 2009–2021 | Detroit Tigers, Chicago White Sox, Chicago Cubs, Arizona Diamondbacks, Minnesota Twins, Washington Nationals |
| Josh Rutledge | 2012–2017 | Colorado Rockies, Boston Red Sox |
| Jimmy Nelson | 2013–2017, 2019–2021 | Milwaukee Brewers, Los Angeles Dodgers |
| Adam Morgan | 2015–2021 | Philadelphia Phillies, Chicago Cubs |
| Spencer Turnbull | 2018–present | Detroit Tigers, Philadelphia Phillies, Toronto Blue Jays |
| Taylor Guilbeau | 2019–2020 | Seattle Mariners |

== See also ==
- 2019 Alabama Crimson Tide baseball team
- List of NCAA Division I baseball programs
- Alabama Crimson Tide
- Alabama Crimson Tide softball
