= Flag City Sluggers =

- Logo

Information
- League: Great Lakes Summer Collegiate League
- Location: Findlay, Ohio
- Ballpark: Fifth Third Field at Marathon Diamonds
- Founded: 2025
- Nickname: Sluggers
- Colors: Red, white, blue
- General manager: Joe Kroeger
- Manager: Tyler Smith
- Media: The Courier
- Website: www.flagcitysluggers.com

The Flag City Sluggers are a collegiate summer baseball team that competes in the Great Lakes Summer Collegiate League (GLSCL), one of eight leagues formed under the National Alliance of College Summer Baseball (NACSB). The team plays at Fifth Third Field at Marathon Diamonds. Their mascot is Slider, a blue slug swinging a baseball bat.

== History ==
The Flag City Sluggers were announced as an expansion team in July 2024. The team played its first season in the Great Lakes Summer Collegiate League in 2025, finishing in last place in the North Division with a 20-20 (0.500) record.

== Season records ==
Records
Season	Wins	Losses	Pct	Playoffs
2025	20	20	.500	Did not make playoffs
2026	21	20	.512	Did not make playoffs
All-Time	41	40	.506	
