= Jason Jackson =

Jason Jackson may refer to:

- Jason Jackson (reporter) (born 1972), American sportscaster
- Jason Jackson (fighter) (born 1990), Jamaican mixed martial artist
- Jason Jackson (baseball), American college baseball coach
- Jason Baird Jackson (born 1969), American professor of folklore and anthropology
