= Travis Shaw =

American baseball player (born 1990)

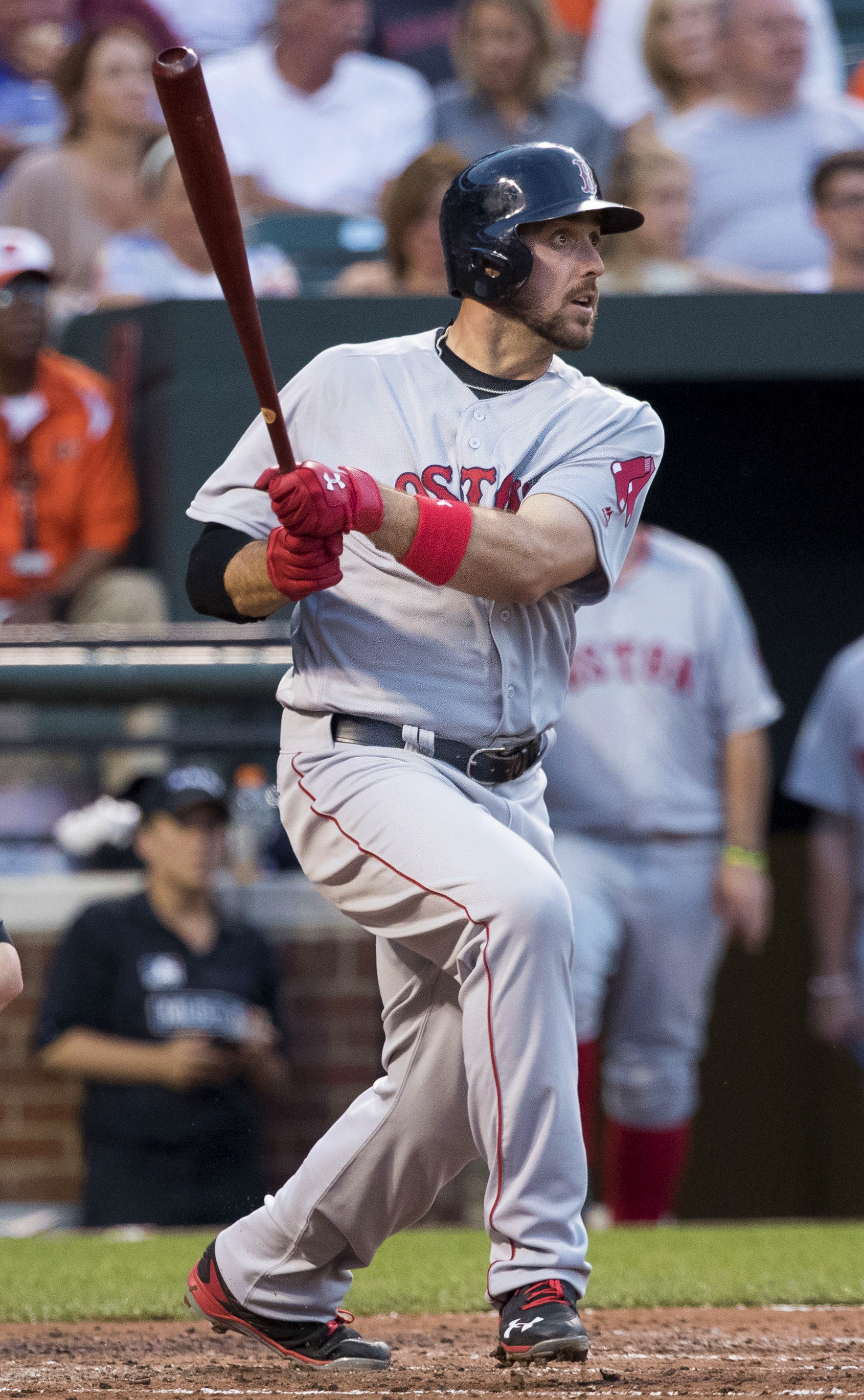
- Shaw with the Boston Red Sox in 2016
- Third baseman / First baseman
- Born: April 16, 1990 (age 35); Washington Court House, Ohio, U.S.
- Batted: Left Threw: Right

MLB debut
- May 8, 2015, for the Boston Red Sox

Last MLB appearance
- April 28, 2022, for the Boston Red Sox

MLB statistics
- Batting average: .237
- Home runs: 114
- Runs batted in: 366
- Stats at Baseball Reference

Teams
- Boston Red Sox (2015–2016); Milwaukee Brewers (2017–2019); Toronto Blue Jays (2020); Milwaukee Brewers (2021); Boston Red Sox (2021–2022)

Travis Richard Shaw (born April 16, 1990) is an American former professional baseball infielder who played eight seasons in Major League Baseball (MLB). He played for three MLB teams—the Boston Red Sox, Milwaukee Brewers and Toronto Blue Jays—and was nicknamed the Mayor of Ding Dong City. During his professional career, he was listed at 6 feet 4 inches (1.93 m) and 230 pounds (100 kg); he batted left-handed and threw right-handed. His father, Jeff, is a former two-time All-Star pitcher who played for six major-league teams.

== Amateur career ==
Shaw was born and raised in the city of Washington Court House, Ohio. Shaw attended Washington High School, the alma mater of his father, Jeff, a former MLB closer who was a two-time All-Star who played for six major league teams during an 11-year career. Travis Shaw played college baseball at Kent State University in Kent, Ohio. He batted a .307 average with a Mid-American Conference-leading 14 home runs while playing 62 games for the Golden Flashes in 2011. He also slugged .553 and collected 51 runs batted in, being named to the first team All-MAC in 2011 and the second team in 2010. In 2009, he played collegiate summer baseball with the Cincinnati Steam of the Great Lakes Summer Collegiate League.In 2010, he played collegiate summer baseball with the Bourne Braves of the Cape Cod Baseball League.

== Professional career ==
=== Boston Red Sox ===
==== Minor leagues ====
The Red Sox selected Shaw in the ninth round of the 2011 MLB draft and he made his professional debut that year with the Short-Season A Lowell Spinners, leading them in RBI (36) and ending second in doubles (14), home runs (8) and runs scored (34). On July 2 of that season, he set a team record for the most total bases (12) in a single game, after going 4-for-4 with a home run, three doubles and two walks, driving in five runs while scoring three times. He finished the year at Low Class A Greenville Drive, batting .333 in two games before gaining a promotion to the High Class A Salem Red Sox in 2012.

Shaw had a breakout season at Salem, hitting .305 with a .411 on-base percentage in 99 games, while leading the team in home runs (16), RBI (73) and runs (69), being named to the Carolina League mid-season All-Star team. He was promoted to the Double-A Portland Sea Dogs early in August, but was strongly tested in the upper Eastern League, where he finished with a .227 average, three home runs and 12 RBI in 31 games. Even so, he was among the five best Red Sox minor leaguers in 2012, ranking second both in RBI (85) and OPS (.918), fourth in slugging (.519), while tying for second in on-base percentage (.399) and for fourth in home runs (19).

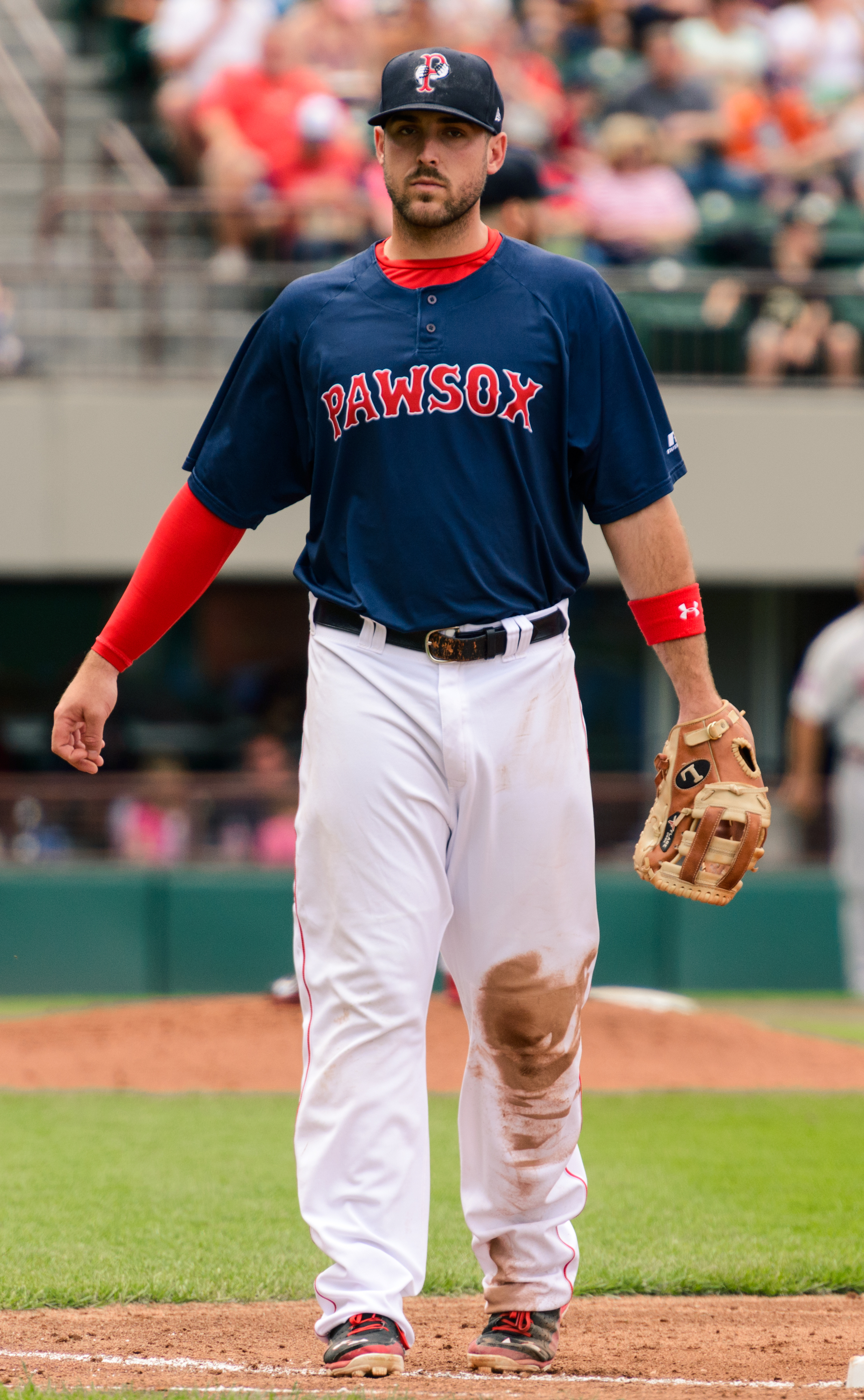
Shaw with the Triple-A Pawtucket Red Sox in 2014

In 2013 Shaw scuffled while adjusting to Double-A, hitting a paltry .221 in 127 games with Portland. Nevertheless, he finished with 16 home runs, 50 RBI and a very solid .452 OBP. Then, during the offseason he had a chance to play against some of the best prospects in baseball in the Arizona Fall League, where he hit a .361/.452/.705 line with five home runs and 19 RBI in 17 games for the Surprise Saguaros team.

Shaw steadily progressed in 2014, while splitting time between Double-A and Triple-A. He hit .305/.406/.548 with 11 home runs and 37 RBI in 208 plate appearances for Portland before gaining a promotion to the Triple-A Pawtucket Red Sox. He finished strong at Pawtucket, hitting .262/.321/.431 with 10 home runs and 41 RBI in 81 games.

Overall in 2014, Shaw topped the Sox minor league system with 21 home runs and collected 78 RBI, being surpassed only by Carlos Asuaje (101). He also scored a second-best 78 runs behind Mookie Betts (87) and was second in extra base hits (52) to Asuaje (65), while improving his approach from 2013. As a result, Shaw walked more than he struck out in Portland (29-to-23) and posted acceptable strikeout (76) and walk (28) rates at Pawtucket. Shaw ranked 19th in the MLB.com Top 20 Boston Red Sox Prospects list for 2014.

Shaw was added to the 40-man roster in November 2014. He was promoted to the major league club on May 8, 2015, making his major league debut on the same day against the Toronto Blue Jays. He was optioned to Pawtucket the next day.

==== Major leagues ====
On May 8, 2015, Shaw was called up from Triple-A Pawtucket and made his MLB debut, going 0-2 with a walk. On June 14, he was called up again and played in five more games, but still had not recorded his first major league hit. On July 7, he was called back up and recorded his first major league hit, a second inning single against the Miami Marlins. Shaw went 3-for-4 on the night with a run scored. On August 1, Shaw hit two home runs, went 4-for-4 with a walk, and was a triple shy of hitting for the cycle. Two weeks later, in Boston's 15–1 rout of the Seattle Mariners, Shaw went 3-for-5 with two home runs, his second career two-homer game. Shaw became the second MLB player to have a pair of two-homer games in the first 18 games of his career.

During spring training in 2016, manager John Farrell stated that there would be open competition for the starting third baseman's job between Shaw and the struggling Pablo Sandoval. After slashing .338/.394/.492, Shaw was named the Opening Day starter at third base.

During his time in Boston, Shaw was nicknamed "Mayor of Ding Dong City". He appeared in 210 games with the Red Sox, batting .251 with 29 home runs and 107 RBIs.

=== Milwaukee Brewers ===
On December 6, 2016, the Red Sox traded Shaw, Mauricio Dubón, and Josh Pennington to the Milwaukee Brewers for Tyler Thornburg. On April 3, 2017, Shaw was the starting third baseman, making his Brewers debut on Opening Day against the Colorado Rockies. He went 2-for-4, hitting two doubles, including an RBI double, and striking out twice. Shaw went on to have a tremendous season with the 2017 Brewers, batting .273, with 31 home runs and 101 RBIs, along with 10 stolen bases in 144 games played.

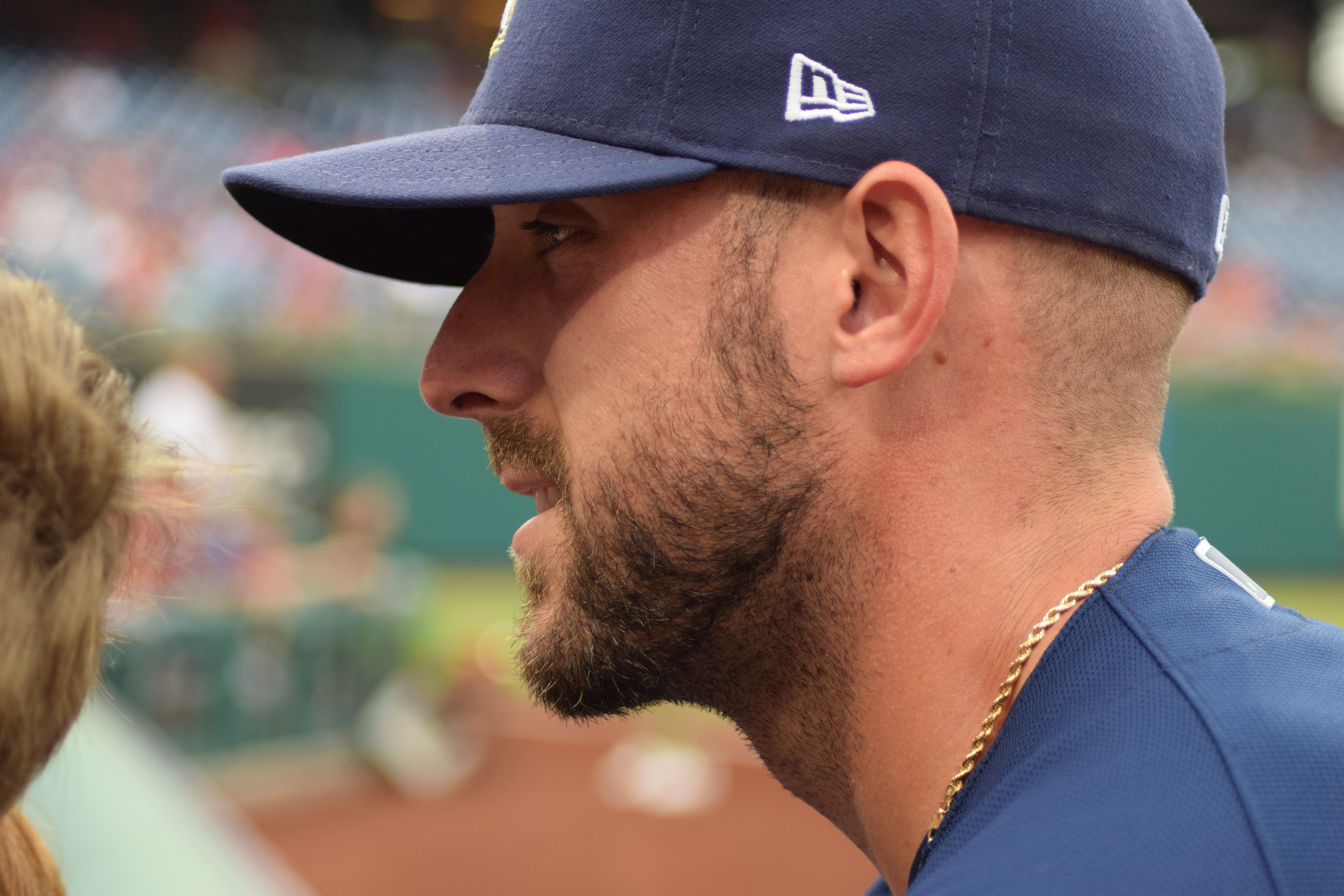
Shaw with the Brewers in 2018

In 2018, Shaw appeared in 152 games with the Brewers, batting .241 with 32 home runs and 86 RBIs. Following the Brewers' acquisitions of Royals third baseman Mike Moustakas and Orioles infielder Jonathan Schoop in late July, Shaw shifted primarily to second base while also logging innings at first base. In the postseason, he batted 4-for-11 (.364) in the Division Series with one RBI.

After two seasons with Milwaukee, early on in the 2019 season Shaw found himself mired in a 2-for-32 slump. He was eventually optioned to AAA San Antonio Missions on June 27, as he was hitting .164/.278/.290 with just 6 homers and an OPS of .568. Shaw was then recalled on July 26 after hitting .286 in AAA, but after going just 2-for-14 with 5 strikeouts in his return, he was optioned back to AAA on August 9. On December 2, 2019, Shaw was non-tendered and became a free agent.

=== Toronto Blue Jays ===
On December 30, 2019, Shaw signed a one-year, $4 million contract with the Toronto Blue Jays.

On July 24, 2020, Shaw was the starting third baseman, making his Blue Jays debut on Opening Day. On August 12, 2020, he recorded his 100th MLB career homerun. Overall with the 2020 Blue Jays, Shaw batted .239 with six home runs and 17 RBIs in 50 games. On December 2, Shaw was nontendered by the Blue Jays.

=== Milwaukee Brewers (second stint) ===
On February 16, 2021, Shaw signed a minor league contract with the Milwaukee Brewers organization that included an invitation to spring training and an opt-out date of March 15. On March 16, the Brewers added Shaw to their 40-man roster. On June 12, Shaw was placed on the 60-day injured list after suffering a left shoulder dislocation. In 56 games with the Brewers, Shaw batted .191 with six home runs and 28 RBIs; defensively, he made 45 starts at third base and three starts at first base.

=== Boston Red Sox (second stint) ===
On August 15, 2021, Shaw was claimed off waivers by the Red Sox; he was added to the team's active roster the next day. The following week, his first hit since rejoining the team was a walk-off grand slam to give Boston an extra-innings win over the Texas Rangers. Shaw appeared in 28 regular-season games for Boston, batting .238 with three home runs and 11 RBIs. He also appeared in five postseason games, going 1-for-5 as a pinch hitter, as the Red Sox advanced to the American League Championship Series. On November 3, Shaw elected to become a free agent.

Shaw re-signed with the Red Sox on March 18, 2022. In spring training in 2022, he competed with Franchy Cordero, Rob Refsnyder, Christin Stewart, Jonathan Araúz, and Yolmer Sánchez for one of two available roster spots; Shaw was included on Boston's Opening Day roster. He was designated for assignment on April 29 after failing to reach base in 19 plate appearances. Shaw subsequently elected to become a free agent rather than accepting a minor-league assignment.

On January 16, 2023, Shaw announced his retirement.

== Personal life ==
Shaw married Lindy Berry in 2012. The couple welcomed their first child, a daughter named Ryann, in June 2017. Ryann was born with hypoplastic left heart syndrome and required three open heart surgeries that summer. She was released from the hospital, after nearly five months, shortly after the Brewers' season ended.

Shaw is the son of former All-Star closer Jeff Shaw.
