= Jake Goebbert =

American baseball player (born 1987)

- Outfielder
- Born: September 24, 1987 (age 38); Hampshire, Illinois, U.S.
- Batted: Left Threw: Left

MLB debut
- June 20, 2014, for the San Diego Padres

Last MLB appearance
- September 27, 2014, for the San Diego Padres

MLB statistics
- Batting average: .218
- Home runs: 1
- Runs batted in: 10
- Stats at Baseball Reference

Teams
- San Diego Padres (2014)

Jacob Dwayne Goebbert (born September 24, 1987) is an American former professional baseball outfielder. He played for the San Diego Padres of Major League Baseball (MLB) in 2014.

== Career ==
=== Amateur ===
Goebbert attended Hampshire High School in Hampshire, Illinois, where he played for the school's baseball and football teams. He then attended Northwestern University, where he played college baseball for the Northwestern Wildcats baseball team in the Big Ten Conference. During his collegiate career, Goebbert played for the Southern Ohio Copperheads of the Great Lakes Summer Collegiate League in collegiate summer baseball. In 2009, he played collegiate summer baseball with the Harwich Mariners of the Cape Cod Baseball League.

=== Houston Astros ===
The Houston Astros drafted Goebbert in the 13th round (401st overall) of the 2009 Major League Baseball draft. Playing in Minor League Baseball, the Astros promoted Goebbert from Single–A to Triple–A during the 2011 season. They invited him to spring training in 2012. He finished the 2012 season with the Corpus Christi Hooks of the Double–A Texas League.

=== Oakland Athletics ===
At the end of spring training in 2013, the Astros assigned Goebbert to the Oklahoma City RedHawks of the Triple–A Pacific Coast League. Before he could play for Oklahoma City, the Astros traded Goebbert to the Oakland Athletics in exchange for Travis Blackley. He played for the Double-A Midland RockHounds of the Texas League and Triple-A Sacramento River Cats of the Pacific Coast League in 2013.

=== San Diego Padres ===
On May 15, 2014, the Athletics traded Goebbert to the Padres for Kyle Blanks and a player to be named later, later identified as Ronald Herrera.

On June 19, 2014, Goebbert was called up from Triple-A El Paso to replace the injured first baseman Yonder Alonso. Goebbert was primarily an outfielder in the minor leagues after having played first base at Northwestern University, but El Paso had been occasionally playing him at first base after his acquisition by the Padres. At the time of his call-up, Goebbert was hitting .270 with 5 HR and 18 RBI at El Paso. Goebbert had a pinch-hit RBI single in his first Major League plate appearance on June 20 and made his first start in left field the next day. He was optioned back to El Paso on July 25 when Alonso returned. Goebbert returned to the Padres on August 12 when Everth Cabrera went to the disabled list, and he remained with the team for the rest of the season. Goebbert batted .218 with one home run in 101 at-bats, starting 19 games at first base and 4 in left field. He was designated for assignment by the Padres on January 7, 2015, but remained with the club, attending Padres spring training in 2015 as a non-roster invitee.

=== Pittsburgh Pirates ===
On November 25, 2015, Goebbert signed to a major league contract with the Pittsburgh Pirates. He was designated for assignment on April 3, 2016.

=== Tampa Bay Rays ===
He was claimed off waivers by the Tampa Bay Rays on April 6. He became a free agent after the 2016 season.

=== Arizona Diamondbacks ===
On January 27, 2017, Goebbert signed a minor league contract with the Arizona Diamondbacks. He was released on March 28, 2017.

== Personal life ==
Goebbert and his wife, Heather, reside in Pingree Grove, Illinois during the offseason. When he is not playing, Goebbert hosts youth baseball clinics and works on the family farm in Hampshire. Goebbert's Pumpkin Patch includes exotic animals and a train ride.

Goebbert delivered the commencement address at Judson University in December 2013.
