= Foundation Field =

Baseball stadium in Hamilton, Ohio, U.S.

- Location within Ohio Foundation Field (the United States)
- Interactive map of Foundation Field
- Address: 1140 S. Front Street; Hamilton, Ohio
- Coordinates: 39°23′19″N 84°34′2″W
- Capacity: 3,000 (2002–2003); 300 (2003–present)

Construction
- Opened: April 2, 2002

Tenants
- Miami Hamilton Harriers (ORCC) 2002–present Hamilton Joes (GLSCL) 2009–present Florence Freedom (FL) 2003

Foundation Field is a 300-seat baseball stadium located at 1140 S. Front Street in downtown Hamilton, Ohio, adjacent to the Booker T. Washington Community Center. The field opened April 2, 2002, with a baseball game between Miami University Middletown and Miami University Hamilton. It hosted the Florence Freedom in 2003 while Champion Window Field was being constructed and is currently hosting the Hamilton Joes of the Great Lakes Summer Collegiate League. The field is also home to the Miami University Hamilton Harriers college baseball team.
