= Jason Jackson (baseball) =

American baseball coach

Current position
- Title: Associate head coach
- Team: Alabama
- Conference: SEC

Biographical details
- Born: November 10; Havana, Florida, U.S.
- Education: Florida State

Playing career
- 1998: Santa Fe College
- 1999: Tallahassee C.C.
- Position: Pitcher

Coaching career (HC unless noted)
- 2002: North Florida C.C. (P)
- 2003–2006: Mercer (P/RC)
- 2007–2008: South Alabama (P)
- 2009–2017: Florida Atlantic (P)
- 2018–2023: Alabama (P)
- 2023: Alabama (interim head coach)
- 2024–present: Alabama (associate/P)

Head coaching record
- Overall: 13–6 (.684)
- Tournaments: NCAA: 3–2 (.600)

Jason Jackson is an American college baseball coach and currently a pitching and associate head coach for the Alabama Crimson Tide. Jackson served as interim head coach of Alabama for the remainder of the 2023 season following the firing of Brad Bohannon.

== Early life and education ==
Jason Jackson was born on November 10 and is a native of Tallahassee, Florida, being born in the Tallahassee suburb Havana, Florida. Jackson attended Florida State University where he earned his bachelor's degree in physical education. He later earned his master's degree there in sports administration.

== Coaching career ==
Jackson began his coaching career for the North Florida Community College, and later Mercer and South Alabama, where he would have moderate success at various positions within the organizations. Following these stints, Jackson became a long-time assistant for the Florida Atlantic baseball team, where he helped guide many players to future success in the MLB, and helped Florida Atlantic make the playoffs in some years. Jackson later became an assistant coach for the Alabama Crimson Tide men's baseball team, where he would become interim head coach after the firing of Brad Bohannon in 2023. After his lone season as interim head coach, Jackson was retained as an associate head coach and pitching coach upon the hiring of new head coach Rob Vaughn.

== Head coaching record ==
Record table
Season	Team	Overall	Conference	Standing	Postseason
Alabama Crimson Tide (Southeastern Conference) (2023)
2023	Alabama	13–6	7–2	4th (West)	NCAA Super Regional
Alabama:		13–6 (.684)	7–2 (.778)		
Total:		13–6 (.684)			
National champion Postseason invitational champion Conference regular season champion Conference regular season and conference tournament champion Division regular season champion Division regular season and conference tournament champion Conference tournament champion
