= Blaine Crim =

American baseball player (born 1997)

NC Dinos – No. 50
- First baseman
- Born: June 17, 1997 (age 29); Mobile, Alabama, U.S.
- Bats: Right Throws: Right

Professional debut
- MLB: May 2, 2025, for the Texas Rangers
- KBO: July 2, 2026, for the NC Dinos

MLB statistics (through 2025 season)
- Batting average: .200
- Home runs: 5
- Runs batted in: 12

KBO statistics (through August 21, 2026)
- Batting average: .250
- Home runs: 3
- Runs batted in: 15
- Stats at Baseball Reference

Teams
- Texas Rangers (2025); Colorado Rockies (2025); NC Dinos (2026–present)

Linton Blaine Crim (born June 17, 1997) is an American professional baseball first baseman for the NC Dinos of the KBO League. He has previously played in Major League Baseball (MLB) for the Texas Rangers and Colorado Rockies.

== Amateur career ==
Crim attended St. Paul's Episcopal School in Mobile, Alabama. As a senior, Crim went 12–0 on the mound with a 1.88 ERA and 69 strikeouts, while hitting .536 with eight home runs and 61 RBIs to earn Alabama Coastal Player of the Year and 2nd team 2014-15 All-USA Alabama Baseball Team.

Undrafted out of high school, Crim attended Mississippi College, where he played college baseball for the Mississippi College Choctaws. Crim hit .300/.358/.424/.781 with 3 home runs and 33 RBI and went 3–4 with a 7.18 ERA over 36 1/3 innings on the mound as a freshman in 2016. He hit .335/.392/.540/.933 with 8 home runs and 41 RBI in 2017.

During the summer of 2017, he played for the Southern Ohio Copperheads of the Great Lakes Summer Collegiate League and hit .359/.389/.557/.946 with 4 home runs and 38 RBI and being named the MVP of GLSCL All-Star game. Crim produced a .383/.435/.665/1.100 batting line with 13 home runs and 66 RBI as a junior in 2018. That summer he returned to play for Southern Ohio, slashing .404/.419/.680/1.099 with 7 home runs and 52 RBI. He returned for his senior season in 2019 and hit .373/.423/.689/1.112 with 11 home runs and 56 RBI.

== Professional career ==
=== Texas Rangers ===
The Texas Rangers selected Crim in the 19th round of the 2019 MLB draft and he signed with them. Crim split his professional debut season of 2019 between the AZL Rangers of the Rookie-level Arizona League and the Spokane Indians of the Low-A Northwest League, slashing a combined .348/.411/.543 with eight home runs and 48 RBI. He was named the 2019 Northwest League MVP. Crim did not play in a game in 2020 due to the cancellation of the minor league season because of the COVID-19 pandemic.

Crim opened the 2021 season with the Hickory Crawdads of the High-A East, hitting .300/.372/.559 with 20 home runs and 61 RBI over 73 games, and was named to the 2021 High-A East All-Star team. Then promoted to the Frisco RoughRiders of the Double-A Central, he finished the season hitting .288/.331/.525 with nine home runs and 19 RBI over 35 games. He played for the Indios de Mayagüez of the Puerto Rican Winter League following the 2021 season. Crim was the league batting champion after hitting .406/.452/.594 with three home runs and 25 RBI. Crim split the 2022 season between Frisco and the Round Rock Express of the Triple-A Pacific Coast League, hitting a combined .293/.357/.485 with 24 home runs and 96 RBI.

Crim received a non-roster invitation to major league spring training in 2023 and returned to Round Rock for the 2023 season, hitting .290/.385/.506 with 22 home runs and 85 RBI. Crim was named the 2023 True Ranger Award winner. He spent the 2024 season back with Round Rock, hitting .277/.370/.469 with 20 home runs and 86 RBI.

Crim returned to Round Rock to open the 2025 season. On May 2, 2025, Texas selected Crim's contract and promoted him to the major leagues for the first time. In five appearances for the Rangers, he went 0-for-11 with one walk.

Crim was designated for assignment on July 31.

=== Colorado Rockies ===
On August 3, 2025, Crim was claimed off waivers by the Colorado Rockies. On September 13, Crim recorded his first career hit, a three-run home run off of JP Sears of the San Diego Padres. During his time with the Rockies, Crim had 61 plate appearances in 15 games. He slashed .241/.295/.556 with an .851 OPS (120 OPS+), also hitting five home runs.

Crim began the 2026 campaign with the Triple-A Albuquerque Isotopes, hitting .265/.339/.449 with seven home runs, 35 RBI, and two stolen bases across 36 games. On May 20, 2026, Crim was designated for assignment by the Rockies.

=== Texas Rangers (second stint) ===
On May 23, 2026, Crim was claimed off of waivers by the Texas Rangers. He made 21 appearances for the Triple-A Round Rock Express, batting .263/.345/.461 with three home runs and 15 RBI. Crim was released by Texas on June 26, in order to pursue an opportunity in Asia.

=== NC Dinos ===
On July 1, 2026, Crim signed a $275,000 contract with the NC Dinos of the KBO League for the remainder of the 2026 season.
