= Bob Wren Stadium =

Sports venue in Athens, Ohio

Coordinates: 39°19′28″N 82°06′32″W

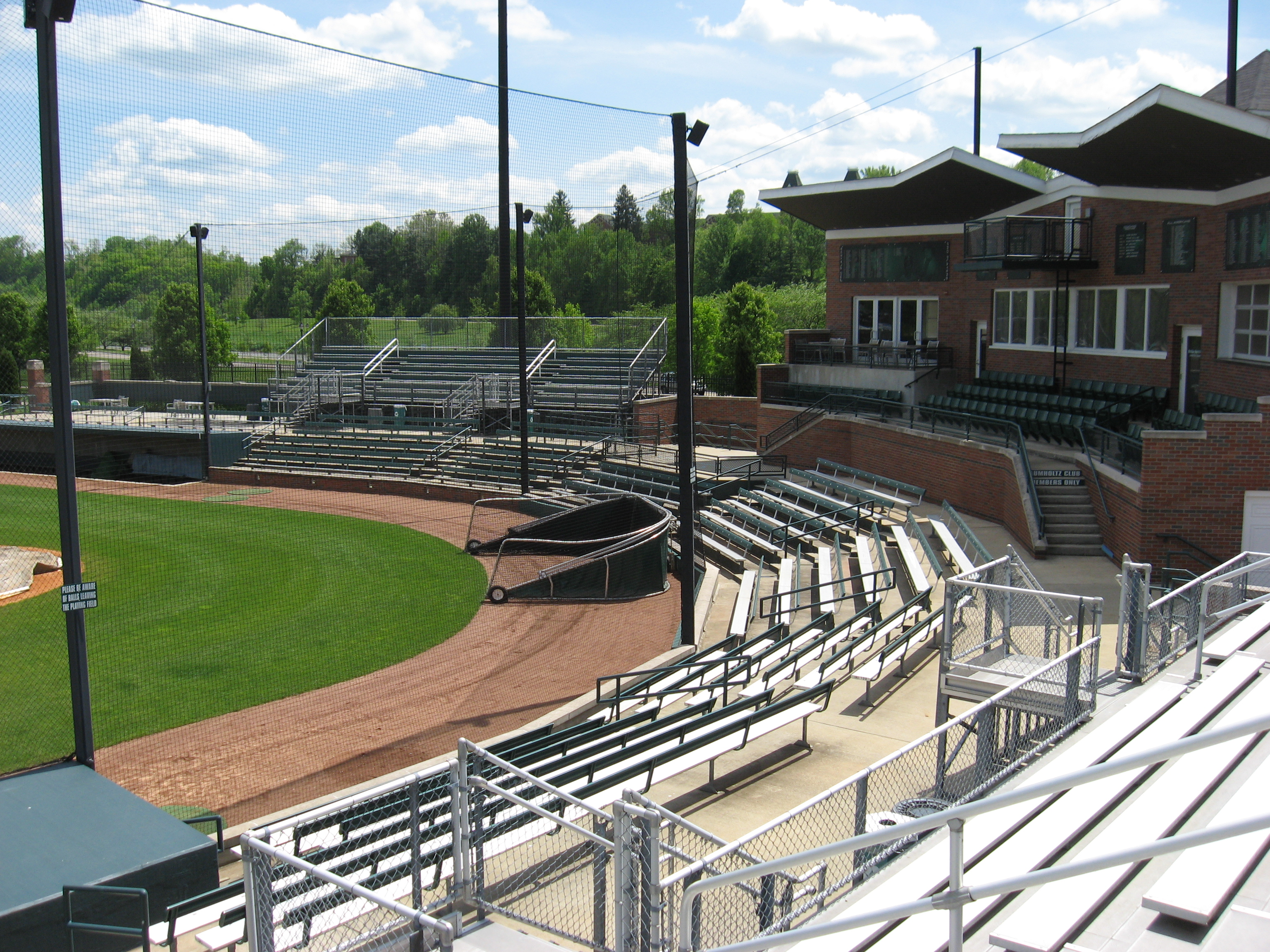
- Interactive map of Bob Wren Stadium
- Location: Athens, Ohio
- Owner: Ohio University
- Operator: Ohio University
- Capacity: 4,000
- Surface: Natural Grass
- Field size: Left Field - 340 ft. Left Field Alley - 380 ft. Center Field - 405 ft. Right Field Alley - 380 ft. Right Field - 340 ft.

Construction
- Groundbreaking: 1997
- Opened: April 18, 1998
- Cost: $2 millionUSD
- Architect: various

Tenants
- Ohio Bobcats (NCAA) (1998–Present); Southern Ohio Copperheads (GLSCL) (2002–Present)

Bob Wren Stadium is a baseball stadium located in Athens, Ohio on the campus of Ohio University. It is home field for the Ohio Bobcats since opening on April 18, 1998 and Southern Ohio Copperheads since 2002. The Bobcats opened the facility by defeating the Bowling Green Falcons 4–1 in front of 1,389 fans.

Bob Wren Stadium features many modern amenities and hosts capacity for 4,000 spectators. The stadium has 100 chairback seats that are part of the VIP club, named the Baumholtz Club in honor of former Ohio baseball player Frank Baumholtz. In addition, there are around 1,000 bleacher-back seats in the stadium and another 1,000 seats of regular bleachers. Down both the third and first base lines there are two grassy knolls that are capable of seating up to another 1,000 fans.

There are two concession stands available with traditional ballpark fare, and members of the Baumholtz Club have access to a private lounge that serves more upscale food items. The press box provides multiple phones and computer lines for members of the media. There are also two radio broadcast booths and one television broadcast booth available.

The stadium has undergone several modifying enhancements since opening. In 2003, a large Daktronics digital scoreboard was added to the outfield of the stadium. That same year, heated batting cages were added to the northeast of the stadium, allowing Bobcat players to practice inside during cold weather. Lights were installed in 2004. As a result of this new addition, 15 of Ohio's 28 home games in 2005 were played at night. In the fall of 2018, the playing field underwent an extensive renovation to replace the existing natural infield with the new Nicholson Family Turf.

The stadium is named for former Bobcat head coach Bob Wren, who held the highest all-time winning percentage of any Ohio baseball coach. The field is named after former Ohio Basketball coach Dutch Trautwein.

In addition to serving as the home of Ohio Bobcats baseball, Bob Wren Stadium is home to the Southern Ohio Copperheads of the Great Lakes Summer Collegiate League and is the home of the state American Legion baseball tournament every year.

== See also ==
- List of NCAA Division I baseball venues
