= Greg Byrne (athletic director) =

American college athletics administrator (born 1971)

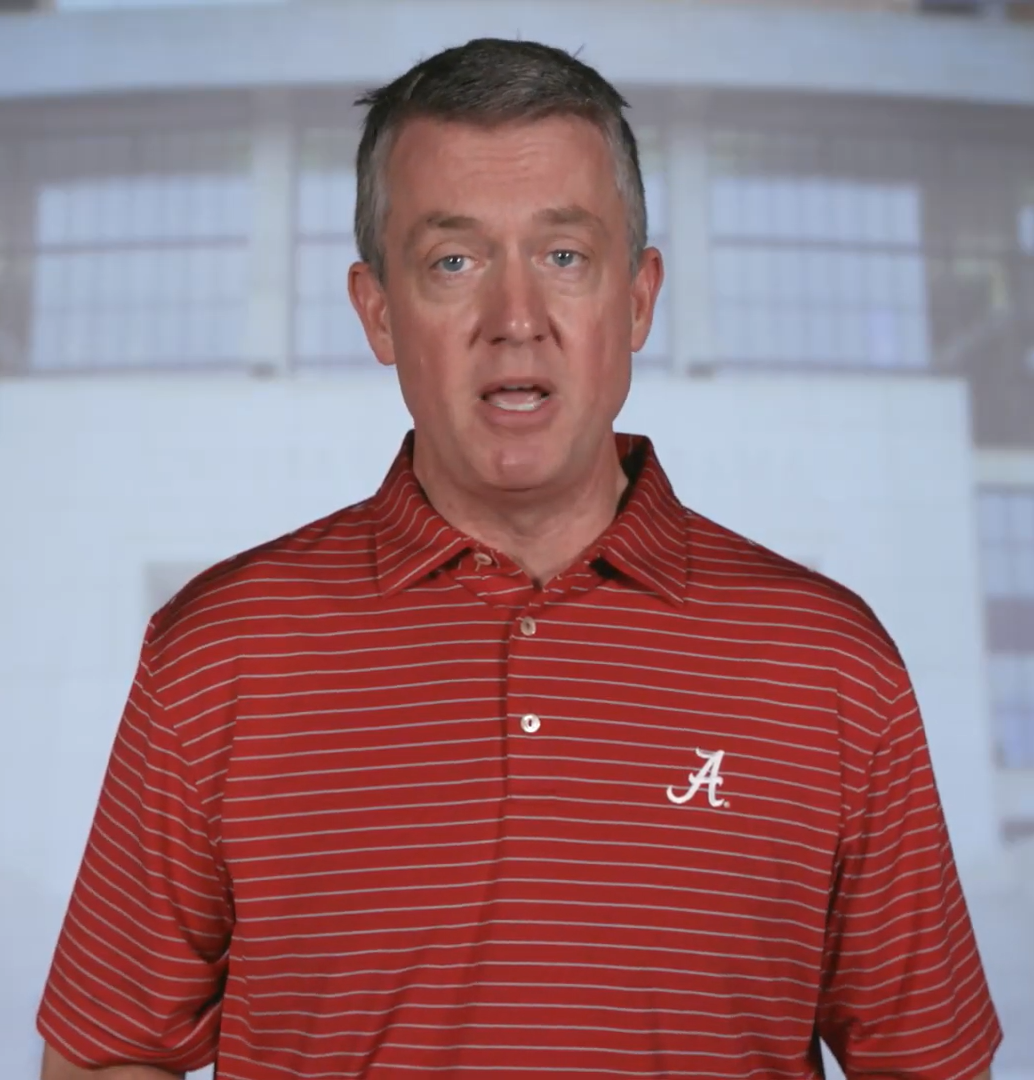
- Byrne in 2021

Current position
- Title: Athletic director
- Team: Alabama
- Conference: SEC

Biographical details
- Born: November 29, 1971 (age 54); Pocatello, Idaho, U.S.
- Education: Arizona State University (1994)

Administrative career (AD unless noted)
- 1994–1995: Fiesta Bowl
- 1995–1998: Oregon (Asst. AD)
- 1998–2002: Oregon State (Assoc. AD)
- 2002–2005: Kentucky (Assoc. AD)
- 2006–2008: Mississippi State (Sr. Assoc.)
- 2008–2010: Mississippi State
- 2010–2017: Arizona
- 2017–present: Alabama

Greg Byrne (born November 29, 1971) is an American sports administrator who is the athletic director at the University of Alabama. Prior to this appointment, Byrne was the athletic director at the University of Arizona from 2010-2017, the athletic director at Mississippi State University from 2008–2010 after serving as associate athletic director for the preceding two years. Previously, Byrne held associate director of athletics positions at University of Kentucky, and Oregon State University.

== Early life, education and career ==
Byrne was born in Pocatello, Idaho. He attended Sheldon High School in Eugene, Oregon, and earned his bachelor's degree at Arizona State University in 1994 and then his master's degree at Mississippi State University in 2009. In 1995 Byrne was named the regional director of development for the University of Oregon athletic department, serving as a regional fundraiser for the U of O in regions in Southern Oregon, Northern California, Portland metropolitan area, along with areas in Seattle. Byrne then moved to Oregon State University as an associate AD for development in 1998 where his duties included fundraising. From 2002 to 2005, Byrne was the associate AD for development and fundraising at the University of Kentucky.

In a brief departure from his athletic administration career, Byrne was the national director of sales for a litigation case management and research software company in 2005. In 2006, Byrne joined Mississippi State University as associate athletic director for external affairs and was subsequently named as athletic director in 2008 following the move of longtime MSU athletic director Larry Templeton to an advisory post to the President of the university. Byrne is married to the former Regina Misa of Junction City, Oregon, and has two sons, Nick and Davis. Byrne's father Bill Byrne is the former athletics director at Texas A&M University.

== Athletic director career ==
=== Mississippi State ===
Byrne was the athletic director for Mississippi State University. On June 7, 2008, Byrne hired John Cohen as head baseball coach to replace Ron Polk, who retired the preceding March. Polk, who endorsed his assistant Tommy Raffo upon his retirement, protested the hire and waged a very personal and public attack on Byrne.

On December 10, 2008, Byrne hired Dan Mullen as head football coach to replace Sylvester Croom who resigned after five years and a 21–38 record at Mississippi State. Byrne received many plaudits for hiring Mullen, who was considered a rising star in coaching. Among Mullen's accomplishments, he coached NFL first round draft pick Alex Smith at University of Utah, recruited 2007 Heisman Trophy winner Tim Tebow to University of Florida where he also won two National Championships.

=== Arizona ===
On March 22, 2010, Greg Byrne was hired at the University of Arizona (replacing longtime Arizona AD Jim Livengood, who accepted the AD position at UNLV some months prior) and officially started in his new position on May 1, 2010. Byrne took over a long-term $378 million sports expansion project at Arizona, announced the previous fall, that would include an expansion of the north end zone stands at Arizona Stadium. The expansion would include a four-story building that would house locker rooms and football offices, among other things. In January 2011, Byrne announced that a new 5,356-square-foot (497.6 m^{2}) video board would be installed above the south stands in time for the 2011 season. It is the sixth-largest video screen in college football.

Also under Byrne, another, more immediate and major change to the Wildcat football program occurred: eight-year head coach Mike Stoops was relieved of his duties on Oct 10, 2011 after the Wildcats opened the season with a 1–5 record. Co-defensive coordinator Tim Kish was named as interim head coach.

On November 21, 2011, Arizona announced the hiring of Rich Rodriguez to replace Stoops. Rodriguez previously served as the head football coach at Salem University (1988), Glenville State College (1990–1996), West Virginia (2001–2007), and the University of Michigan (2008–2010); he was also assistant coach, offensive coordinator, and quarterback coach for Tulane University (1997–1998) and Clemson University (1999–2000) (both under head coach Tommy Bowden).

Rodriguez' West Virginia teams played in (and won) three consecutive BCS bowl games. Rodriguez was an analyst for CBS Sports during the 2011 football season after a less-than-successful and disappointing tenure at Michigan. His hiring at Arizona was first announced by Greg Byrne on Twitter while a press conference officially announcing him as the head coach was held a day later at McKale Center in Tucson.

In 2012, after making the decision to move the Arizona Wildcats baseball team from their on-campus stadium to the off-campus Hi Corbett Field, the Arizona Wildcats possessed the third-highest attendance on the West Coast and hosted both a Regional and Super Regional. The team went on to win the 2012 College World Series, Byrne's first championship as Athletic Director.

=== Alabama ===
Early in his Alabama tenure, Byrne extended the contract of head coach Nick Saban making him the highest-paid coach in college football history. Byrne also made changes to the Alabama baseball program, hiring head coach Brad Bohannon. In 2019, he fired men's basketball coach Avery Johnson and hired Nate Oats. That same year, the football team went on to win the College Football Playoff national championship game, Byrne's second championship as Athletic Director. In January 2024, he quickly hired Kalen DeBoer of Washington to serve as successor to legendary football coach Nick Saban following his unanticipated retirement.
