= Lima Locos =

Collegiate summer baseball team

Information
- League: Great Lakes Summer Collegiate League (North)
- Location: Lima, OH
- Ballpark: Simmons Field
- Founded: 1987
- League championships: (8) 1993, 2004, 2011, 2015, 2017, 2019, 2023, 2025
- Former name: Lima Blues
- Former ballpark(s): Ohio State University, Lima; Shawnee High School
- Colors: Orange, Blue, White
- President: Bill Leahy
- General manager: Tim Clark
- Manager: Matt Furuto
- Website: www.limalocos.net

The Lima Locos are a collegiate summer baseball team based in Lima, Ohio. The team is a member of the Great Lakes Summer Collegiate League, one of 11 leagues in the National Alliance of College Summer Baseball.

The Locos play their home games at Simmons Field.

== History ==
Originally named the Lima Blues, the Lima Locos are one of the founding members of the Great Lakes Summer Collegiate League. Playing their first season in 1987, the Lima Blues finished third among the original six GLSCL teams. The early success attracted the attention of a group of local businessmen from Lima, OH who purchased the Blues and changed the team's name to the Lima Locos for the 1988 season.

In 1991, the Locos moved their home games from the campus of Ohio State University, Lima to the field at suburban Shawnee High School. While this moved the team outside of the city, it actually was a great improvement to the facilities the team called home. As opposed to the OSU Lima field, the quality lighting of Shawnee allowed the Lima Locos to host night games for the first time.

In 2008, the Locos worked out a long-term agreement with the City of Lima that allowed them to move the team back into the city limits to play their home games at Simmons Field.

Like other Summer Collegiate Baseball teams, the Lima Locos are dedicated to providing minor league level competition for NCAA players that wish to continue on into professional baseball. The Locos operate in a similar manner to a Minor League team: playing nightly in stadiums before fans, using wood bats and minor league specification equipment, and experiencing road trips between games. Like all other summer collegiate players, they are unpaid in order to maintain their NCAA eligibility, and live with host families in the same manner as Single A and Independent League players.

The Lima Locos are the only remaining team from the original six teams of the Great Lakes Summer Collegiate League.
