= Cincinnati Steam =

Collegiate summer baseball team in Cincinnati, Ohio

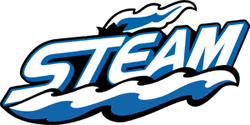
Team logo
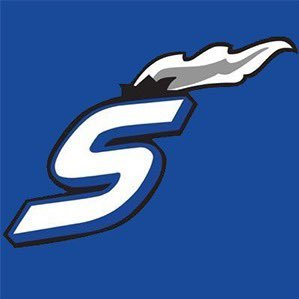
Cap insignia

Information
- League: Great Lakes Summer Collegiate League (South Division)
- Location: Cincinnati
- Ballpark: Hayden Field @ Xavier University; Panther Athletic Complex (Elder HS); P&G Red's Urban Youth Academy
- Founded: 2006
- Nickname(s): The Steam, Cincy Steam
- League championships: 2008, 2009
- Division championships: 2008, 2009, 2012
- Colors: Royal Blue, White
- Ownership: Bill O'Conner & Steve Brown
- General manager: Tony Brumfield
- Manager: Alex Dickey
- Website: Cincinnati Steam Baseball

The Cincinnati Steam is a collegiate summer baseball club that competes in the South Division of the Great Lakes Summer Collegiate League, which is one of twelve leagues formed under the National Alliance of College Summer Baseball.

The Steam club was founded in 2006 and plays their home games at Hayden Field at Xavier University and Elder High School's P.A.C. in Cincinnati. The Cincinnati Steam Baseball Club has a close association with the Cincinnati Reds Community Fund and The Reds Urban Youth Academy.

The GLSCL was established by Major League Baseball in order to develop college baseball prospects and is one of many summer collegiate baseball circuits throughout the country that has produced numerous major league players over the years. Although the play is highly competitive, all GLSCL players are NCAA eligible and are unpaid in order to maintain their amateur eligibility.

Each GLSCL team is operated similar to a professional Minor League Baseball team, providing players an opportunity to perform under the same conditions using wooden bats, minor league specification baseballs and parks, experiencing overnight road trips and playing nightly before fans in a ballpark.

Among Cincinnati Steam players who made the major league grade are Adam Eaton, Josh Harrison, Nathan Jones, Charles Leesman, Travis Shaw, and Ryan Strausborger.

Minor league prospects include Kyle Bluestein, Tyler Hollstegge, Zach Isler, Ian Kadish, Jorge Marban, Steve Matre, Dave Middendorf, Joseph O'Gara, Jake Proctor, Danny Rosenbaum, Nate Smith, and Seth Willoughby.
