= Brad Bohannon =

American college baseball coach (born 1975)

Biographical details
- Born: May 13, 1975 (age 51); Rome, Georgia, U.S.
- Education: Berry College

Playing career
- 1994: Vanderbilt
- 1995: Georgia Tech
- 1996–1997: Berry College
- Position: Infielder

Coaching career (HC unless noted)
- 2001–2002: Wake Forest (asst.)
- 2004–2015: Kentucky (asst.)
- 2016–2017: Auburn (asst.)
- 2018–2023: Alabama

Head coaching record
- Overall: 166–124 (.572)
- Tournaments: SEC: 2–2; NCAA: 1–2

William Bradley Bohannon (born May 13, 1975) is an American former college baseball coach and middle infielder.

== Early life, education, and playing career ==
Born in Rome, Georgia, Bohannon graduated from the Darlington School in 1993.

Bohannon played college baseball at Vanderbilt University in 1994 before transferring to Georgia Tech in 1995 and finally ending up at Berry College in 1996 and 1997. Bohannon graduated from Berry with a bachelor's degree in finance in 1998 and Wake Forest University with an MBA in 2002.

In 1997 and 1998, Bohannon played first base, second base, third base, and left field for the Dubois County Dragons of the Heartland League; he made the 1998 Heartland League All-Star Team.

== Coaching career ==
=== Assistant coach (2001–2017) ===
Bohannon was a volunteer assistant coach for Wake Forest from 2001 to 2002, specializing in outfielding and baserunning in addition to hitting. Then in 2003, Bohannon worked for a year as a senior financial analyst at the Intel Corporation office in Portland, Oregon.

Returning to college baseball, Bohannon was a volunteer assistant coach under John Cohen for Kentucky from 2004 to 2005 and was promoted to a paid assistant coach position in 2006, later adding duties of recruiting coordinator and third base coach under the next head coach Gary Henderson.

In 2015, he was named the ABCA/Baseball America Assistant Coach of the Year.

From 2016 to 2017, Bohannon was assistant coach at Auburn.

=== Alabama head coach (2018–2023) ===
Bohannon was announced on June 5, 2017 as the new head baseball coach for the Alabama Crimson Tide baseball. At Alabama, Bohannon had a 166–124 record in six seasons and an appearance in the 2021 NCAA Division I Baseball Tournament.

==== Gambling scandal ====
On May 4, 2023 Alabama athletic director Greg Byrne suspended Bohannon with intent to fire him for cause amid his involvement in gambling activity. Surveillance video from BetMGM's sportsbook at Great American Ball Park in Cincinnati indicated that someone placing bets on Alabama's April 28 game against LSU was communicating with Bohannon at the time. Four states halted betting on Alabama baseball amid concerns about suspicious activity. In a letter to Bohannon, Byrne said there was evidence Bohannon had breached at least 10 clauses in his contract. Among other things, Byrne claimed Bohannon failed to cooperate with school officials, placed bets on collegiate games, and gave information to people he knew were gamblers. Byrne also claimed Bohannon violated numerous Alabama policies, committed "dishonest acts," and engaged in conduct detrimental to Alabama. Until a formal hearing on whether there was reason to fire him for cause, Bohannon was barred from campus, could not represent the team or school or communicate with players, recruits, fans or reporters.

It subsequently emerged that Bohannon alerted the person placing the bet in Cincinnati that Crimson Tide ace pitcher Luke Holman for the LSU game was going to be replaced due to back tightness, and did so before informing his counterparts at LSU. The gambler attempted to bet $100,000 on LSU, but was limited to $15,000. He tried to place additional bets, but sportsbook staff refused to allow the bets to go through after the gambler showed them messages from Bohannon. On May 1, U. S. Integrity, a company that monitors sportsbooks for potential fraudulent activity, issued a nationwide alert about suspicious betting activity on Alabama baseball games. When the Ohio Casino Control Commission alerted the NCAA about the suspicious bets, it immediately launched an investigation. Alabama informed the NCAA about its own investigation on May 3. It also revealed that it began the process of severing ties with Bohannon when he refused to cooperate with the internal investigation. Realizing his position was untenable, Bohannon resigned on May 17, a day before the hearing.

On February 1, 2024, the NCAA issued a 15-year show-cause penalty to Bohannon, effective until January 31, 2039. This is tied for the longest such penalty ever meted out to a coach. The NCAA harshly criticized Bohannon for not only violating NCAA rules on gambling and ethical conduct, but for refusing to cooperate with either the NCAA or Alabama in their investigations. The NCAA added an unusual stipulation to Bohannon's show-cause. It required any NCAA member that hired Bohannon during this time to suspend him from coaching duties for five regular seasons, effectively banning him from coaching again during this time. Normally, most schools will not even consider hiring a coach with a show-cause penalty in effect, effectively blackballing that coach from the collegiate ranks at least for the duration of the show-cause. If Bohannon is ever employed by an NCAA member school during this time, his new employer would have to show cause for why both it and Bohannon would not have to certify in writing that they will comply with the sanctions every six months. Additionally, any school that hires Bohannon could face severe punishment if he commits another violation during the show-cause period.

== Head coaching record ==
Record table
Season	Team	Overall	Conference	Standing	Postseason
Alabama Crimson Tide (Southeastern Conference) (2018–2023)
2018	Alabama	27–29	8–22	7th (West)	
2019	Alabama	30–26	7–23	7th (West)	
2020	Alabama	16–1	0–0	(West)	Season canceled due to COVID-19
2021	Alabama	32–26	12–17	5th (West)	NCAA Regional
2022	Alabama	31–27	12–17	6th (West)	
2023	Alabama	30–15	9–12		Fired mid-season
Alabama:		166–124 (.572)	48–91 (.345)		
Total:		166–124 (.572)			
National champion Postseason invitational champion Conference regular season champion Conference regular season and conference tournament champion Division regular season champion Division regular season and conference tournament champion Conference tournament champion
