= Great Lakes Summer Collegiate League =

Collegiate summer baseball league

- Sport: Baseball
- Founded: 1987; 39 years ago
- Commissioner: Deron Brown
- Motto: Future MLB stars in your backyard
- No. of teams: 8
- Country: United States
- Most recent champion: Grand Lake Mariners (2026)
- Website: www.glscl.org

The Great Lakes Summer Collegiate League (GLSCL) is a collegiate summer baseball league in the Great Lakes region of the United States. It is affiliated with the National Alliance of College Summer Baseball and comprises teams with college baseball players from around North America. The league is sanctioned and supported by Major League Baseball. Players are not paid so as to maintain their NCAA eligibility, and the league follows NCAA rules. Many of the teams play in baseball stadiums that are normally occupied by college teams.

The Great Lakes Summer Collegiate League uses wooden bats to prepare collegiate players for the transition to professional baseball.

== History ==
Following the 2023 season, the league announced that five teams–Cincinnati Steam, Jet Box Baseball Club, Licking County Settlers, Richmond Jazz, Sandusky Bay Ice Haulers–would skip the 2024 season to "reorganize [...] for future long term stability" with the option to return after one season, and that the Royal Oak Leprechauns would leave the league. The Leprechauns joined the Northwoods League. The Flag City Sluggers joined the league in 2025, joining the seven teams that competed in 2024.

== Teams ==
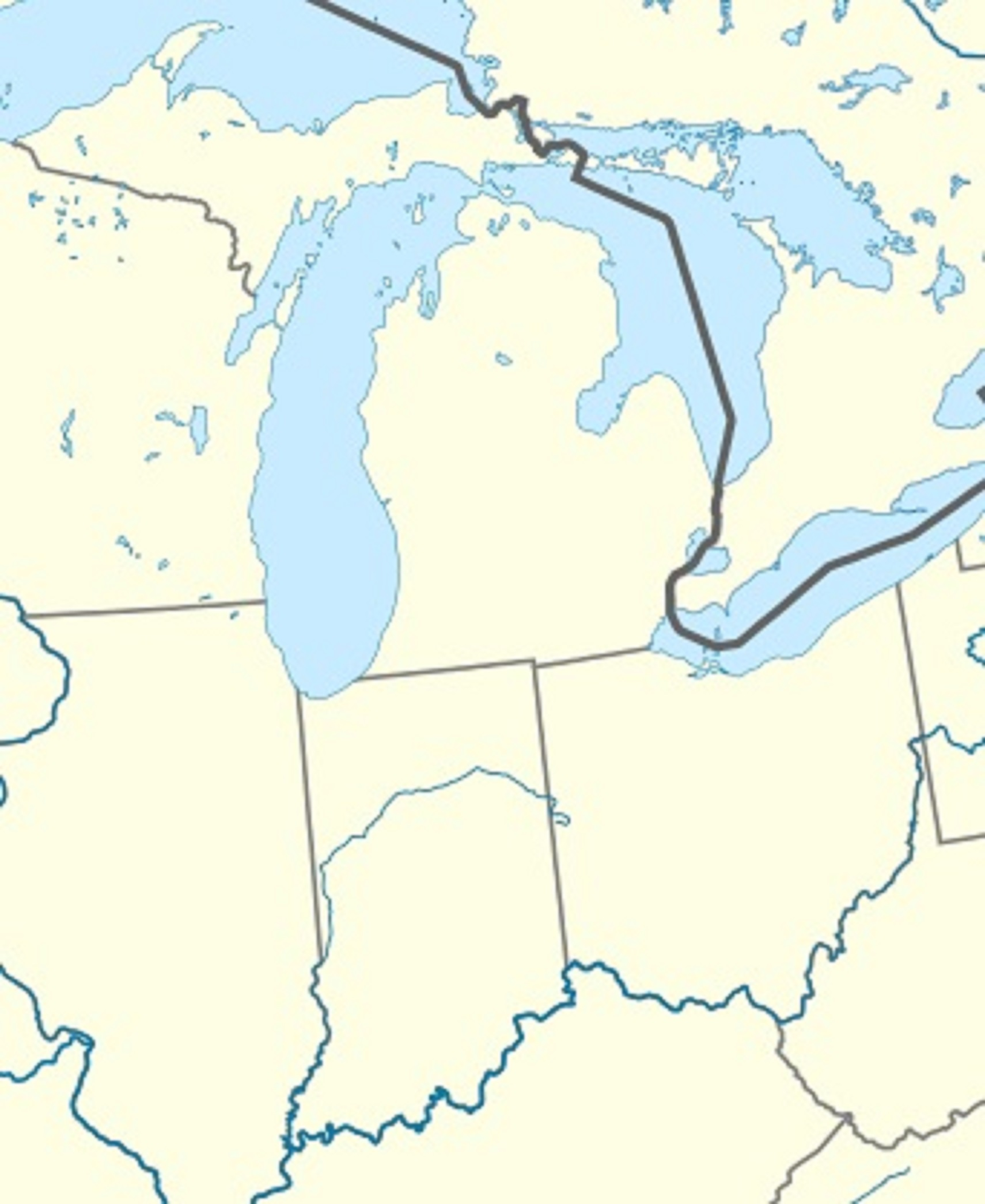
GLSCL Teams for the 2025 Season

Team	City	Stadium(s)
Flag City Sluggers (eff. 2025)	Findlay, Ohio	Fifth Third Field at Marathon Diamonds
Lima Locos	Lima, Ohio	Simmons Field
Michigan Monarchs	Adrian, Michigan	Siena Heights University Baseball Diamond
Muskegon Clippers	Muskegon, Michigan	Marsh Field
Grand Lake Mariners	Celina, Ohio	Montgomery Field
Hamilton Joes	Hamilton, Ohio	Foundation Field
Southern Ohio Copperheads	Athens, Ohio	Bob Wren Stadium
Xenia Scouts	Xenia, Ohio	Grady's Field at AIA Sports Complex

== Former teams ==
- Anderson Servants (1987–2009)
- Columbus All-Americans (1987–2008)
- Delaware Cows (1991–2010)
- Stark County Terriers (1999–2012)

== Notable GLSCL alumni ==
- Chad Cordero
- Shane Costa
- Kyle Lewis
- Griffin Doersching
- Brent Suter
- Andy Young
- David Dellucci
- Dustin Hermanson
- Ryan Rua
- Quinton McCracken
- Paul Quantrill
- Scott Sauerbeck
- Jonathan Sánchez
- Ed Lucas (baseball)
- Nick Swisher
- Jay Jackson
- Brian Bixler
- Josh Harrison
- Adam Russell
- Cory Luebke
- John Van Benschoten
- Brad Hennessey
- Eric Wedge
- Dayton Moore
- Matt Mieske
- Dan Masteller
- A.J. Sager
- Tom Marsh
- Blaine Crim
- Scott Effross
- Chris Bassitt
