= National Alliance of College Summer Baseball =

Group of college baseball leagues in US

The National Alliance of College Summer Baseball consists of 12 summer baseball leagues sanctioned by the National Collegiate Athletic Association (NCAA).

== Leagues ==
- Atlantic Collegiate Baseball League – Eastern Pennsylvania, Northern New Jersey, Staten Island
- Cal Ripken Collegiate Baseball League – DC, Central Maryland, and Suburban Virginia
- California Collegiate League - The State of California from Orange County to Napa Valley
- Cape Cod Baseball League – Cape Cod area of Massachusetts
- Florida Collegiate Summer League – Orlando area
- Great Lakes Summer Collegiate League – Indiana, Ohio, Michigan and Ontario
- Hamptons Collegiate Baseball League – Eastern Long Island in New York
- New England Collegiate Baseball League – New England
- New York Collegiate Baseball League – Northwestern New York state
- Southern Collegiate Baseball League – Western North Carolina and Northwestern South Carolina (Charlotte, NC metro area)
- Sunbelt Baseball League – Metro Atlanta, Georgia
- Valley Baseball League – Central/Western Virginia

== Most Valuable Program Award ==
Each year, the NACSB honors one or more college or university head coaches with the Most Valuable Program Award.

== See also ==
- Baseball awards #U.S. collegiate summer baseball
