= Amos Alonzo Stagg =

American athlete and coach (1862–1965)

- Stagg in 1889

Biographical details
- Born: August 16, 1862; West Orange, New Jersey, U.S.
- Died: March 17, 1965 (aged 102); Stockton, California, U.S.

Playing career

Football
- 1885–1889: Yale
- 1890–1891: Springfield YMCA
- 1892: Chicago
- Positions: End, fullback, halfback

Coaching career (HC unless noted)

Football
- 1890–1891: Williston Seminary (MA)
- 1890–1891: Springfield YMCA
- 1892–1932: Chicago
- 1933–1946: Pacific (CA)
- 1947–1952: Susquehanna (associate HC)
- 1953–1958: Stockton (ST)

Basketball
- 1920–1921: Chicago

Baseball
- 1893–1905: Chicago
- 1907–1913: Chicago

Track
- 1896–1913: Chicago
- 1914–1928: Chicago

Administrative career (AD unless noted)
- 1892–1933: Chicago

Head coaching record
- Overall: 314–99–35 (college football); 14–6 (college basketball); 266–166–3 (college baseball)
- Bowls: 0–1

Accomplishments and honors

Championships
- Football 2 national (1905, 1913); 7 Western / Big Ten (1899, 1905, 1907–1908, 1913, 1922, 1924); 5 FWC (1936, 1938, 1940–1942) Baseball 3 Western (1896–1898)

Awards
- Football First-team All-American (1889); AFCA Coach of the Year (1943)
- College Football Hall of Fame; Inducted in 1951 (profile)
- Basketball Hall of Fame; Inducted in 1959 (profile)

Amos Alonzo Stagg (August 16, 1862 – March 17, 1965) was an American athlete and college coach in multiple sports, primarily American football. He introduced many innovations to American football. Stagg served as the head football coach at the International YMCA Training School (now called Springfield College) (1890–1891), the University of Chicago (1892–1932), and the College of the Pacific (1933–1946), compiling a career college football record of 314–199–35 (.605). His undefeated Chicago Maroons teams of 1905 and 1913 were recognized as national champions. He was also the head basketball coach for one season at Chicago (1920–1921), and the Maroons' head baseball coach for twenty seasons (1893–1905, 1907–1913).

At Chicago, Stagg also instituted an annual prep basketball tournament and track meet. Both drew the top high school teams and athletes from around the United States.

Stagg played football as an end at Yale University and was selected to the first All-America team in 1889. He was inducted into the College Football Hall of Fame as both a player and a coach in the charter class of 1951 and was the only individual honored in both roles until the 1990s. Influential in other sports, Stagg developed basketball as a five-player sport. This five-man concept allowed his 10- (later 11-) man football team the ability to compete with each other and to stay in shape over the winter. Stagg was elected to the Basketball Hall of Fame in its first group of inductees in 1959, and was elected Fellow #71 in the National Academy of Kinesiology (formerly American Academy of Physical Education) in 1946.

Stagg also forged a bond between sports and religious faith early in his career that remained important to him for the rest of his life.

== Early years ==
Stagg was born in a poor Irish neighborhood of West Orange, New Jersey, and attended Phillips Exeter Academy.

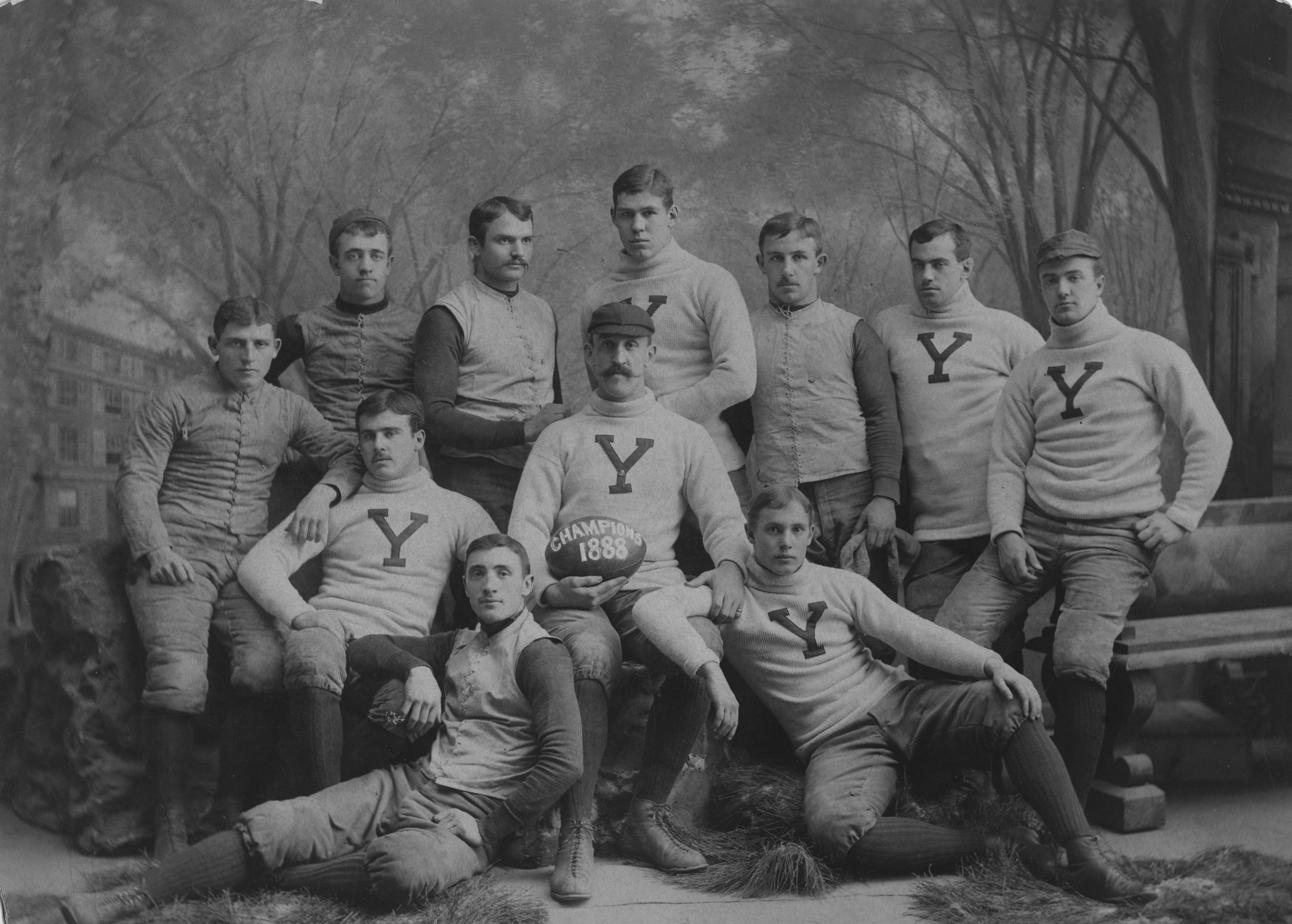
Stagg (far left) on Yale's 1888 team

Stagg entered Yale University in 1884 and received his bachelor's degree in 1888.

At Yale, Stagg was a pitcher on the baseball team. He declined the offers to play for six different professional baseball teams.

Stagg played on Yale's 1888 football team, and was an end on the first All-America team in 1889. He was very active in the Yale YMCA where he served as general secretary during his last two years.

Stagg spent two additional years at Yale Divinity School, studying under William Rainey Harper before deciding he could have more influence on young men through coaching than through the pulpit.

From 1890 to 1892, Stagg was an instructor at the International YMCA Training School, now known as Springfield College, where teacher James Naismith had invented basketball in 1891.

On March 11, 1892, Stagg, still an instructor at the YMCA School, played in the first public game of basketball. A crowd of 200 watched as the student team defeated the faculty, 5–1. Stagg scored the only basket for the losing side. He popularized the five-player lineup on basketball teams.

== Coaching career ==
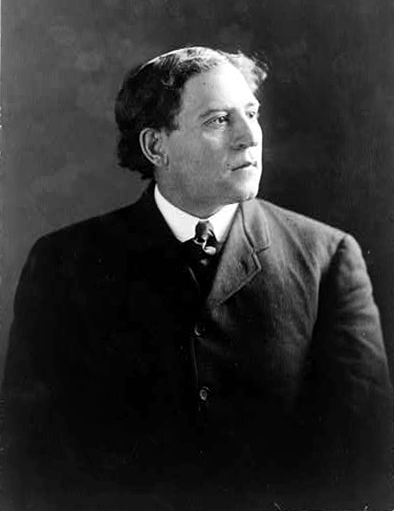
Stagg in 1906.

Stagg became the first paid football coach at Williston Seminary, a secondary school, in 1890. This was also Stagg's first time receiving pay to coach football. He coached there one day a week while also coaching full-time at the International YMCA Training School. Stagg then coached at the University of Chicago from 1892 to 1932. He was the head football coach and director of the Department of Physical Culture. Eventually, university president Robert Maynard Hutchins forced out the 70-year-old Stagg, feeling that he was too old to continue coaching.

At age 70, Stagg moved on to the College of the Pacific in Stockton, California, where he led the Tigers for 14 seasons, from 1933 through 1946, then was asked to resign. One of his players at Pacific in 1945-46 was Wayne Hardin, who later became the Hall of Fame coach of Navy and Temple.

In the 1924 Summer Olympics in Paris, Stagg served as a coach with the U.S. Olympic Track and Field team. He played himself in the movie Knute Rockne, All American, released in 1940. From 1947 to 1952 he served as co-coach with his son, Amos Jr., at Susquehanna University in Pennsylvania. Stagg's final job was as kicking coach at the local junior college in Stockton, California, which was then known as Stockton College. "The Grand Old Man of Football" retired from Stockton College at the age of 96 and died in Stockton six years later.

=== Vegetarianism ===
Stagg was reportedly an activist for vegetarianism and banned his players from using alcohol and tobacco. In 1907, he trained his Chicago football team on a strict vegetarian diet. This was widely reported in newspapers and vegetarian literature. Stagg had spent time at the vegetarian Battle Creek Sanitarium in 1907 and was inspired by John Harvey Kellogg's vegetarian diet. Although Stagg was cited in vegetarian literature as advocating a strict vegetarian diet throughout his life, in his memoir he stated that he was a vegetarian for only two years and did it in an attempt to relieve his chronic sciatic pain. Stagg did not consume alcohol, coffee, or cigarettes and promoted the consumption of vegetables over red meat.

== Family and personal life ==
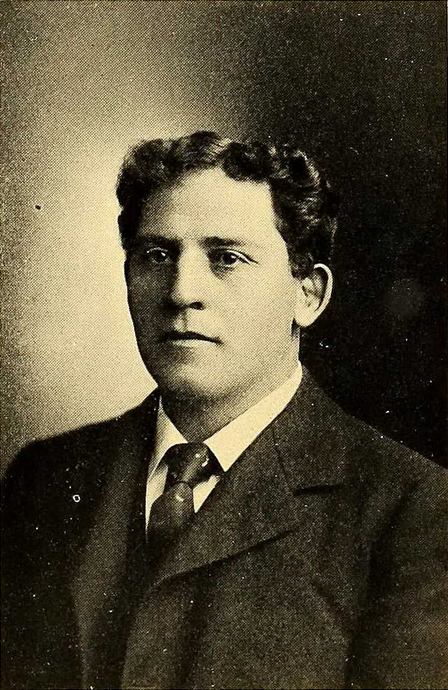
Stagg in 1899

Stagg was married to the former Stella Robertson on September 10, 1894. The couple had three children: two sons, Amos Jr. and Paul, and a daughter, Ruth. Both sons played for the elder Stagg as quarterbacks at the University of Chicago and each later coached college football. In 1952, Barbara Stagg, Amos' granddaughter, started coaching the high school girls' basketball team for Northern Lehigh High School in Slatington, Pennsylvania.

In 1933, Stagg donated an Milburn Light Electric 1921 Model 27L Brougham automobile (of which he was the original owner) to Chicago's Museum of Science & Industry. The vehicle remains in the museum's collection, and is today own of only 56 known surviving Milburn Light Electric vehicles in world.

== Legacy ==
Two high schools in the United States, one in Palos Hills, Illinois, and the other in Stockton, California, and an elementary school in Chicago, Illinois, are named after Stagg. The NCAA Division III National Football Championship game, played in Salem, Virginia, is named the Stagg Bowl after him. The athletic stadium at Springfield College is named Stagg Field. The football field at Susquehanna University is named Amos Alonzo Stagg Field in honor of both Stagg Sr. and Jr. Stagg was also the namesake of the University of Chicago's old Stagg Field. At University of the Pacific in Stockton, California, one of the campus streets is known as Stagg Way and Pacific Memorial Stadium, the school's football and soccer stadium, was renamed Amos Alonzo Stagg Memorial Stadium on October 15, 1988. Phillips Exeter Academy also has a field named for him and a statue. A field in West Orange, New Jersey on Saint Cloud Avenue is also named for him. The Amos Alonzo Stagg Award is awarded annually to the "individual, group, or institution whose services have been outstanding in the advancement of the best interests of football." The winner of the Big Ten Football Championship Game, started in 2011, receives the Stagg Championship Trophy, named in his honor.

At the College of William and Mary, the Amos Alonzo Stagg Society was organized during 1979–1980 by students and faculty opposed to a plan by the institution's Board of Visitors to move William and Mary back into big-time college football several decades after a scandal there involving grade changes for football players. The Society was loosely organized but successful in combating, among other plans, a major expansion of the William and Mary football stadium.

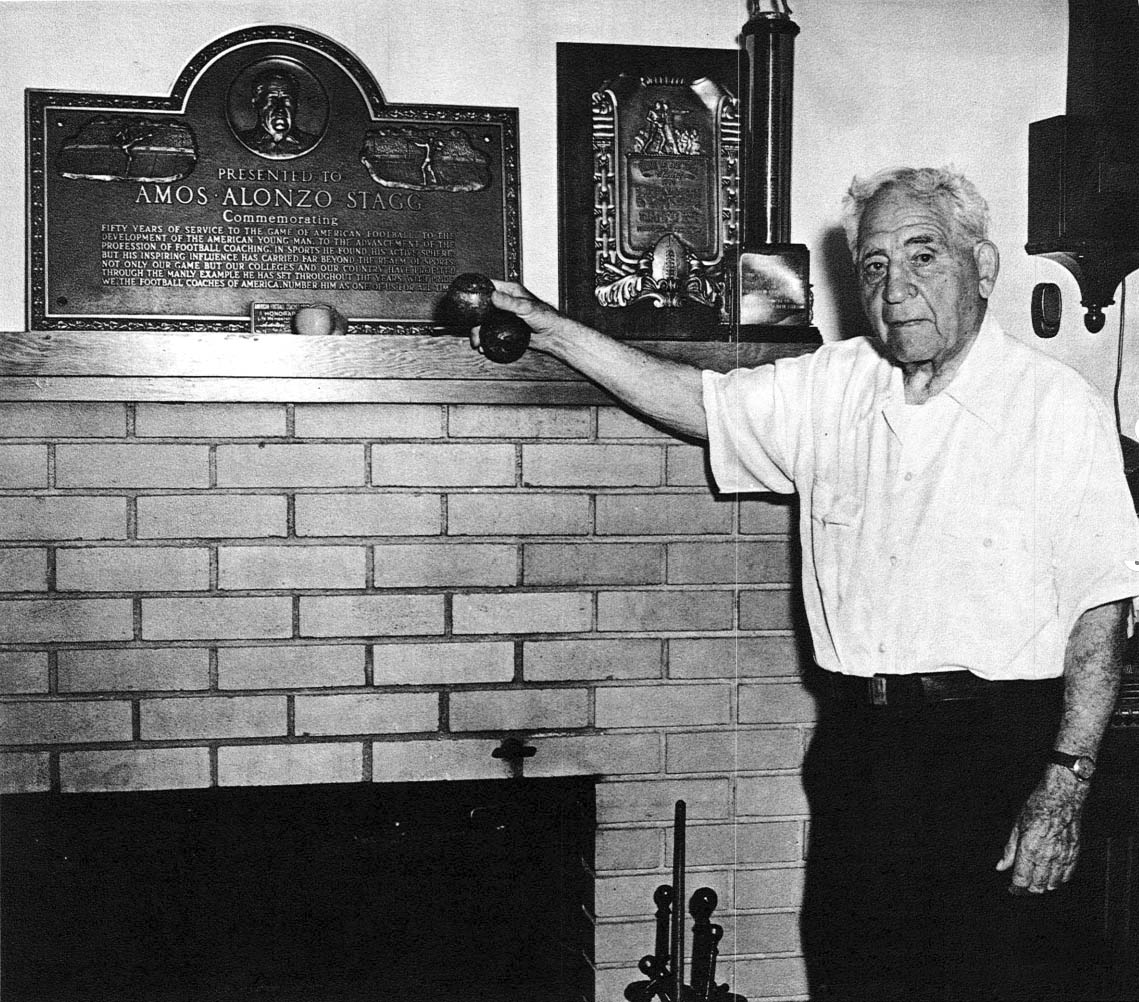
Stagg in 1962

Collections of Amos Alonzo Stagg's papers are held at the University of Chicago Library, Special Collections Research Center and at the University of the Pacific Library, Holt Atherton Department of Special Collections. The Alonzo Stagg 50/20 Hike goes through Arlington, Virginia, Washington, DC and Maryland.

The Stagg Tree, a giant sequoia in the Alder Creek Grove and the fifth largest tree in the world, is named in honor of Amos Alonzo Stagg. Stagg is also an elected Fellow in the National Academy of Kinesiology (née the American Academy of Physical Education).

=== Stagg Bowl ===
The Amos Alonzo Stagg Bowl, otherwise known as the NCAA Division III Football Championship Game since 1973, is competed annually as the final game of the NCAA Division III Football Tournament. The Stagg Bowl can be traced back to 1969, prior to the inception of the D-III national championship. At that time—from 1969 to 1973—the Stagg Bowl was one of two bowls competed at the College Division level—the Knute Rockne Bowl and the Amos Alonzo Stagg Bowl. In 1973, the NCAA instituted the D-III national championship, and the Stagg Bowl was adopted as the moniker for that game.

The first 10 Stagg Bowls were played in Phenix City, Alabama, from 1973 to 1982. Wittenberg University (Ohio) won the inaugural game via a 41–0 result over Juniata College (Pa.). The game moved to Kings Island, Ohio, for the 1983 and 1984 editions, with Augustana College (Ill.) winning the first two of its four straight NCAA titles.

The Stagg Bowl returned to Phenix City for five more years, before spending three seasons in Bradenton, Florida.

In 1993, the Stagg Bowl moved to Salem, Va., where it remained until 2017. The University of Mount Union (formerly Mount Union College) won the first of its NCAA Division III-record 13 football national championships in 1993. The Championship was held in Shenandoah, TX, in 2018 and 2019.

Tom Benson Hall of Fame Stadium at Hall of Fame Village powered by Johnson Controls in Canton, Ohio, was originally awarded the 2020 and 2021 Stagg Bowls; however, the 2020 Championship was cancelled due to the COVID-19 pandemic. The 2021 Stagg Bowl was held at Tom Benson Hall of Fame Stadium December 2–4, 2021.

Navy–Marine Corps Memorial Stadium in Annapolis, Maryland hosted the 2022 Stagg Bowl, where North Central College defeated University of Mount Union. In 2023, Salem Football Stadium in Salem, Virginia was awarded the game.

=== Innovations ===
The following is a list of innovations Stagg introduced to American football. Where known, the year of its first use is annotated in parentheses. Stagg is noted as a 'contributor' if he was one of a group of individuals responsible for a given innovation.

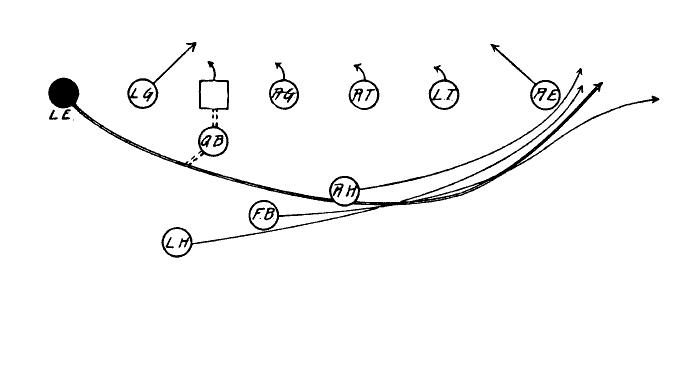
Stagg invented the end-around play (diagram pictured), and published the first book with plays diagrammed

- Ends-back formation (1890)
- Reverse play (1890)
- 7–2–2 defense (1890)
- First indoor game (1891)
- First book on football with diagrams (1893; with Minnesota's Henry Williams)
- First intersectional game (1894)
- center snap (1894; John Heisman and Walter Camp claimed to have invented it in 1893)
- onside kick (1894; possibly contributor)
- huddle (1896)
- quick kick (1896)
- Short punt (1896)
- Spiral snap (1896; contributor alongside Walter Camp, George Washington Woodruff and Germany Schulz)
- line shift (1897)
- placement kick (1897; Stagg believed Princeton used it earlier)
- lateral pass (1898)
- tackling dummy (1899)
- unbalanced line (1900)
- Notre Dame Box (1905)
- varsity letters (1906)
- Statue of Liberty play (1908)
- uniform numbers (1913)
- T formation (contributor)
- forward pass (contributor alongside Eddie Cochems and Walter Camp)
- man in motion
- sleeper play
- quarterback keeper
- delayed buck
- linebacker position
- hip pads
- numerical designation of plays
- padded goalposts
- end-around

=== Coaching tree ===
In addition to Stagg's championships and innovations, another aspect of his legacy is in his players and assistant coaches who went on to become head football and basketball coaches at other colleges and universities across the countries.

Played under:

- Walter Camp

Assistant coaches who became head coaches:

- John Anderson: Knox (1917), Rice (1918) (also played under Stagg at Chicago)
- Hugo Bezdek: Oregon (1906, 1913–1916), Arkansas (1908–1912), Penn State (1918–1929), Cleveland Rams (1937–1938) (also played under Stagg at Chicago)
- Fritz Crisler: Minnesota (1930–1931), Princeton (1932–1937), Michigan (1938–1947) (also played under Stagg at Chicago)
- Ira Davenport: Columbia (IA) (1920–1921)
- Leo DeTray: Ole Miss (1912), Knox (1915–1916)
- Clarence Herschberger: Lake Forest (1902–1904) (also played under Stagg at Chicago)
- Harlan Page: Butler (1920–1925), Indiana (1926–1930), College of Idaho (1936–1937) (also played under Stagg at Chicago)
- James M. Sheldon: Indiana (1905–1913) (also played under Stagg at Chicago)
- Frederick A. Speik: Purdue (1908–1909) (also played under Stagg at Chicago)
- Amos Alonzo Stagg Jr.: Susquehanna (1935–1954) (also played under Stagg at Chicago)
- Paul Stagg: Moravian (1934–1936), Springfield (1937–1940), Worcester Tech (1941–1946), Pacific (1947–1960) (also played under Stagg at Chicago)
- Wayne Hardin: Navy (1959–1964), Philadelphia Bulldogs (1966), Temple (1970–1982) (also played under Stagg at Pacific)
- Larry Siemering: Pacific (1947–1950), Arizona State (1951), Calgary Stampeders (1954)

Former players who went on to become head coaches

- W. J. Keller: Vanderbilt (1893) (played for Stagg at Springfield)
- Art Badenoch: Rose Poly (1906), New Mexico A&M (1910–1913)
- William Boone (American football): Hillsdale (1906)
- Mark Catlin Sr.: Iowa (1906–1908), Lawrence (1909–1918, 1924–1927)
- Maurice Gordon Clarke: Texas (1899), Western Reserve (1900), Washington (1901)
- Paul Des Jardien: Oberlin (1916)
- Campbell Dickson: Beloit (1928), Hamilton (1942)
- Ivan Doseff: Kalamazoo (1910), Iowa State Normal (1919–1920), Luther (1921–1922)
- Daniel Dougherty: Grinnell (1909)
- Shorty Ellsworth: Colorado Mines (1904–1907)
- A. A. Ewing: Northwestern (1894)
- J. C. Ewing: Colorado College (1900–1901), Baylor (1902)
- Frederick Feil: Wabash (1901)
- Sherman W. Finger: Cornell (IA) (1907–1923)
- Charles Firth: VPI (1897), Hillsdale (1913)
- Charles G. Flanagan: Morningside (1902)
- Ralph C. Hamill: Centre (1900)
- Jesse Harper: Alma (1906–1907), Wabash (1909–1912), Notre Dame (1913–1917)
- James R. Henry: DePauw (1902), Vanderbilt (1903)
- Frank E. Hering: Notre Dame (1896–1898)
- A. C. Hoffman: Ripon (1911), Tulane (1913)
- Tony Hinkle: Butler (1926, 1935–1941, 1946–1969), Great Lakes Navy (1942–1943)
- A. F. Holste: Wisconsin–Whitewater (1900), Denison (1902), Rose Poly (1903), Fairmount (1904), Hastings (1908–1910?, 1922–1925)
- Harold Iddings: Miami (OH) (1909–1910), Simpson (1911–1913), Otterbein (1916), Penn (IA) (1921)
- Thomas Kelley: Muhlenberg (1911–1913), Missouri Mines (1914), Alabama (1915–1917), Idaho (1920–1921), Missouri (1922)
- Walter S. Kennedy: Albion (1904–1920)
- E. Pratt King: Delaware (1907)
- Elmer A. Lampe: Carleton (1932–1933)
- Lester Larson: Texas A&M (1907), Louisville (1912–1913)
- Fred Luehring: Ripon (1906–1909)
- Wally Marks: Indiana State (1927–1930, 1933–1941, 1946–1948)
- Hal Mefford: Rose Poly (1916), Kendall (1917)
- Ned Merriam: Texas A&M (1908)
- Theron W. Mortimer: Colorado (1900), Alma (1901)
- Nelson Norgren: Utah (1914–1917)
- Norman C. Paine: Baylor (1913), Arkansas (1917–1918), Iowa State (1920)
- Ed Parry: Oklahoma A&M (1907–1908)
- Alfred W. Place: Buchtel (1903)
- Raymond L. Quigley: Northern Normal and Industrial (1910–1911), Arizona (1912)
- Charles M. Rademacher: Idaho (1915), St. Louis (1917, 1919–1920)
- Joseph Raycroft: Lawrence (1894), Stevens Point Normal (1895–1896)
- Clarence W. Russell: West Virginia (1907), Colorado Mines (1908), New Mexico A&M (1914–1916)
- A. G. Scanlon: Purdue (1918–1920)
- Lewis D. Scherer: Nebraska State Normal (1907–1908), Baker (1910–1912)
- Walter Steffen: Carnegie Tech (1914–1932)
- Herman Stegeman: Beloit (1915), Monmouth (1916–1917), Georgia (1920–1922)
- John Webster Thomas: Haskell (1927–1928)
- John F. Tobin: Tulane (1905)
- Mysterious Walker: Utah Agricultural (1907–1908), Williams (1917), New York Agricultural (1919), DePauw (1921), Drury (1924–1925), Wheaton (1936–1939)
- Horace Whiteside: Earlham (1914–1916)
- Sherburn Wightman: Massillon Tigers (1906), All-Massillons (1907), Dover Giants (1908)
- Ralph H. Young: DePauw (1915), Kalamazoo (1916–1917, 1919–1922), Michigan State (1923–1927)

== Head coaching record ==
=== College football ===
Year	Team	Overall	Conference	Standing	Bowl/playoffs	AP^{#}
Springfield YMCA (Independent) (1890–1891)
1890	Springfield YMCA	5–3				
1891	Springfield YMCA	5–8–1				
Springfield YMCA:		10–11–1				
Chicago Maroons (Independent) (1892–1895)
1892	Chicago	1–4–2				
1893	Chicago	6–4–2				
1894	Chicago	11–7–1				
1895	Chicago	7–3				
Chicago Maroons (Western Conference / Big Ten Conference) (1896–1932)
1896	Chicago	11–2–1	3–2	4th		
1897	Chicago	8–1	3–1	2nd		
1898	Chicago	9–2–1	3–1	2nd		
1899	Chicago	12–0–2	4–0	1st		
1900	Chicago	7–5–1	2–3–1	6th		
1901	Chicago	5–5–2	0–4–1	9th		
1902	Chicago	11–1	5–1	2nd		
1903	Chicago	10–2–1	4–1	4th		
1904	Chicago	8–1–1	5–1–1	3rd		
1905	Chicago	11–0	7–0	1st		
1906	Chicago	4–1	3–1	4th		
1907	Chicago	4–1	4–0	1st		
1908	Chicago	5–0–1	5–0	1st		
1909	Chicago	4–1–2	4–1–1	2nd		
1910	Chicago	2–5	2–4	T–5th		
1911	Chicago	6–1	5–1	2nd		
1912	Chicago	6–1	6–1	2nd		
1913	Chicago	7–0	7–0	1st		
1914	Chicago	4–2–1	4–2–1	7th		
1915	Chicago	5–2	4–2	3rd		
1916	Chicago	3–4	3–3	5th		
1917	Chicago	3–2–1	2–2–1	5th		
1918	Chicago	0–6	0–5	10th		
1919	Chicago	5–2	4–2	3rd		
1920	Chicago	3–4	2–4	8th		
1921	Chicago	6–1	4–1	2nd		
1922	Chicago	5–1–1	4–0–1	T–1st		
1923	Chicago	7–1	7–1	3rd		
1924	Chicago	4–1–3	3–0–3	1st		
1925	Chicago	3–4–1	2–2–1	7th		
1926	Chicago	2–6	0–5	10th		
1927	Chicago	4–4	4–4	5th		
1928	Chicago	2–7	0–5	10th		
1929	Chicago	7–3	1–3	7th		
1930	Chicago	2–5–2	0–4	10th		
1931	Chicago	2–6–1	1–4	8th		
1932	Chicago	3–4–1	1–4	8th		
Chicago:		244–111–27	115–74–12			
Pacific Tigers (Far Western Conference) (1933–1942)
1933	Pacific	5–5	3–2	3rd		
1934	Pacific	4–5	2–2	4th		
1935	Pacific	5–4–1	3–1	2nd		
1936	Pacific	5–4–1	4–0	1st		
1937	Pacific	3–5–2	3–1	2nd		
1938	Pacific	7–3	4–0	1st		
1939	Pacific	6–6–1	2–2	3rd		
1940	Pacific	4–5	2–0	1st		
1941	Pacific	4–7	3–0	1st		
1942	Pacific	2–6–1	2–0	1st		
Pacific Tigers (Independent) (1943–1945)
1943	Pacific	7–2				19
1944	Pacific	3–8				
1945	Pacific	0–10–1				
Pacific Tigers (Far Western Conference) (1946)
1946	Pacific	5–7	2–2	T–2nd	L Optimist	
Pacific:		60–77–7	30–10			
Total:		314–199–35				
National championship Conference title Conference division title or championship game berth
^{#}Rankings from final AP Poll.

=== College baseball ===
Record table
Season	Team	Overall	Conference	Standing	Postseason
Chicago Maroons (Independent) (1893–1895)
1893	Chicago	11–4			
1894	Chicago	11–7			
1895	Chicago	15–5			
Chicago Maroons (Western Conference) (1896–1912)
1896	Chicago	19–11	6–2	1st	
1897	Chicago	16–4	6–2	1st	
1898	Chicago	12–7	8–3	1st	
1899	Chicago	18–8	6–4	3rd	
1900	Chicago	17–16–1	5–8	4th	
1901	Chicago	11–19	7–8	3rd	
1902	Chicago	18–8	7–7	3rd	
1903	Chicago	16–5	7–5	3rd	
1904	Chicago	21–8–1	8–7	3rd	
1905	Chicago	13–12	4–8	3rd	
1906	Chicago	14–7	9–6	3rd	
1907	Chicago	14–10–1	5–6	4th	
1908	Chicago	12–7	8–5	4th	
1909	Chicago	13–6	8–4	3rd	
1910	Chicago	8–7	5–5	4th	
1911	Chicago	11–8	8–6	2nd	
1912	Chicago	8–7	6–6	3rd	
Chicago:		278–166–3 (.625)	113–92 (.551)		
Total:		278–166–3 (.625)			
National champion Postseason invitational champion Conference regular season champion Conference regular season and conference tournament champion Division regular season champion Division regular season and conference tournament champion Conference tournament champion

=== College basketball ===
Record table
Season	Team	Overall	Conference	Standing	Postseason
Chicago Maroons (Big Ten Conference) (1920–1921)
1920–21	Chicago	14–6	6–6	8th	
Chicago:		14–6 (.700)	6–6 (.500)		
Total:		14–6 (.700)			

== See also ==
- List of college football career coaching wins leaders
- List of college football career coaching losses leaders
