= 1904 College Baseball All-Southern Team =

All-star college baseball team from the 1904 season

The 1904 College Baseball All-Southern Team consists of baseball players selected at their respective positions after the 1904 college baseball season. Trinity pitcher Arthur Bradsher pitched two no-hitters and was on his way to a third, when he took himself out with a cut finger in the eighth inning against Guilford. Vanderbilt first-baseman and captain Alex Perry was 6 feet 6 inches tall, very tall in those days.

== All-Southerns ==
Position	Name	School
Pitcher	Julian Dendy	Clemson
Pitcher	Arthur Bradsher	Trinity
Pitcher	Sparkman	Sewanee
Catcher	Sam Woodward	Georgia Tech
First baseman	Alex Perry	Vanderbilt
Second baseman	Frank B. Anderson	Georgia
Third baseman	Truman Smith	Alabama
Shortstop	Lawson Clary	Vanderbilt
Outfielder	White	Nashville
Outfielder	Craig Day	Georgia Tech
Outfielder	Charlie Cox	Georgia
Subs	Stokeley	Mercer
Subs	J. W. Barnett	Tennessee

All players were selected by John Heisman.
