= 1905 Trinity Blue and White baseball team =

American college baseball season

1905 Duke Blue Devils baseball
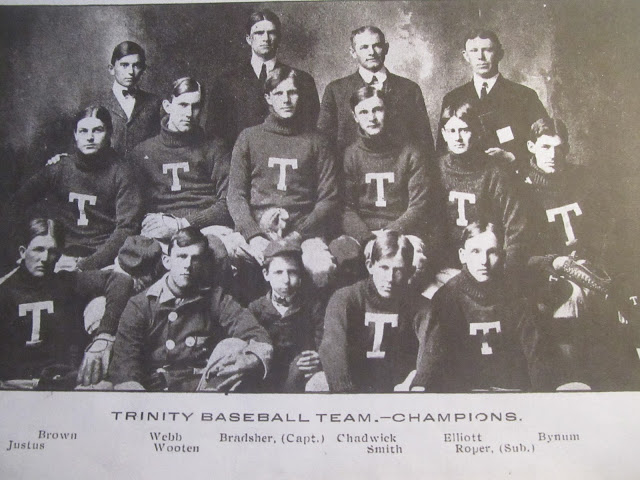
- Conference: Southern Intercollegiate Athletic Association
- Record: 14–6–1 ( SIAA)
- Head coach: Otis Stocksdale
- Captain: Arthur Bradsher
- Home stadium: Hanes Field

The 1905 Trinity Blue and White baseball team represented the Trinity Blue and White baseball team of Trinity College in the 1905 college baseball season.

Bradsher missed a perfect game against Mercer due to a miscue by his shortstop in the second inning of his 22 strikeout, no-hit, no walk, ten inning performance. The game of the year was the loss to Georgia Tech.

John Heisman chose Bradsher as his premier player and captain for his All-Southern team. Barringer led the team in batting average with .253

== Schedule and results ==
Legend
Trinity win
Trinity loss
Tie

1905 Trinity Blue and White baseball game log
Regular season

March
Date	Opponent	Site/stadium	Score	Win	Loss	Save	Attendance	Overall record	SIAA record
Mar 17	Trinity Park HS	Durham, NC	W 11–2					1–0	
Mar 27	Bingham	Durham, NC	W 8–2					2–0	
Mar 29	Lafayette	Durham, NC	L 1–2					2–1	
Mar 30	Lafayette	Durham, NC	W 9–5					3–1	

April
Date	Opponent	Site/stadium	Score	Win	Loss	Save	Attendance	Overall record	SIAA record
Apr 1	Wake Forest	Durham, NC	W 4–1					4–1	
Apr 4	Washington & Lee	Durham, NC	W 9–3					5–1	
Apr 7	Mercer	Macon, GA	T 0–0					5–1–1	
Apr 8	Mercer	Macon, GA	W 5–1	Paul Webb				6–1–1	
Apr 10	Georgia Tech	Brisbane Park • Atlanta, GA	L 2–3	Craig Day	Arthur Bradsher			6–2–1	
Apr 11	Furman	Greenville, SC	W 4–3					7–2–1	
Apr 12	Clemson	Clemson, SC	L 3–4					7–3–1	
Apr 13	Wofford	Spartanburg, SC	L 0–1					7–4–1	
Apr 14	Wofford	Spartanburg, SC	W 4–1					8–4–1	
Apr 17	Syracuse	Durham, NC	W 1–1					9–4–1	
Apr 18	Syracuse	Durham, NC	W 2–1					10–4–1	
Apr 20	Wake Forest	Durham, NC	L 1–5					10–5–1	
Apr 25	Furman	Durham, NC	W 7–1					11–5–1	
Apr 27	St. John's	Durham, NC	W 2–1					12–5–1	

May
Date	Opponent	Site/stadium	Score	Win	Loss	Save	Attendance	Overall record	SIAA record
May 1	NC State	Raleigh, NC	W 2–1					13–5–1	
May 2	Wake Forest	Wake Forest, NC	W 1–0	Arthur Bradsher				14–5–1	
May 15	Wake Forest	Raleigh, NC	L 0–1					14–6–1	
