= 1907 College Baseball All-Southern Team =

All-star college baseball team

The 1907 College Baseball All-Southern Team consists of baseball players selected at their respective positions after the 1907 IAAUS baseball season.

== All-Southerns ==
Position	Name	School
Pitcher	Ed Lafitte	Georgia Tech
Pitcher	Sam Weems	Auburn
Pitcher	William Spencer Love	Vanderbilt
Catcher	Frank R. Wrenn	Trinity
First baseman	Lonnie Noojin	Alabama
Second baseman	Kendrick	Mercer
Third baseman	Jones	Alabama
Shortstop	Frank Martin	Georgia
Outfielder	Chip Robert	Georgia Tech
Outfielder	Sam Costen	Vanderbilt
Outfielder	Alexander	Auburn
Utility	Barksdale	Clemson

All players were selected by John Heisman.
