= 1905 College Baseball All-Southern Team =

All-star college baseball team

The 1905 College Baseball All-Southern Team consists of baseball players selected at their respective positions after the 1905 college baseball season.

== All-Southerns ==
Position	Name	School	Selectors
Pitcher	Arthur Bradsher	Trinity	H, GR
Pitcher	Sam Weems	Auburn	H, GR
Pitcher	Craig Day	Georgia Tech	H, GR [as U]
Pitcher	A. R. Sullivan	Georgia	H [as U], GR
Catcher	H. P. Travis	Vanderbilt	H, GR
First baseman	Clayton Earl "Buck" Wheat	Sewanee	H, GR
Second baseman	Ed Hamilton	Vanderbilt	H, GR
Third baseman	Joe Holland	Clemson	H, GR
Shortstop	Tommy McMillan	Georgia Tech	H, GR
Outfielder	C. B. Gager	Georgia Tech	H, GR
Outfielder	J. T. Steele	Auburn	H, GR
Outfielder	M. Fuller	Tennessee	H
Outfielder	Barrington	Trinity	GR
Utility	Gates	Mercer	H, GR

== Key ==
H = players were selected by John Heisman.

GR = players were selected by Grantland Rice.
