= 1906 College Baseball All-Southern Team =

All-star college baseball team

The 1906 College Baseball All-Southern Team consists of baseball players selected at their respective positions after the 1906 college baseball season.

== All-Southerns ==
Position	Name	School
Pitcher	A. R. Sullivan	Georgia
Pitcher	Ed Lafitte	Georgia Tech
Pitcher	Sam Weems	Auburn
Catcher	N. A. Burgess	Auburn
First baseman	Clayton Earl Wheat	Sewanee
Second baseman	Ed Hamilton	Vanderbilt
Third baseman	Hamilton	Georgia Tech
Shortstop	Tommy McMillan	Georgia Tech
Outfielder	McWhorter	Georgia
Outfielder	Baker	Tennessee
Outfielder	Justus	Trinity
Utility	Webb	Trinity
Utility	J. T. Steele	Auburn

All players were selected by John Heisman.
