= Bennie Owen =

American football player and sports coach (1875–1970)

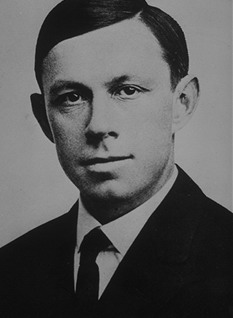

Biographical details
- Born: July 24, 1875; Chicago, Illinois, U.S.
- Died: February 26, 1970 (aged 94); Houston, Texas, U.S.

Playing career

Football
- 1897–1899: Kansas
- Position: Quarterback

Coaching career (HC unless noted)

Football
- 1900: Washburn
- 1901: Michigan (assistant)
- 1902–1904: Bethany (KS)
- 1905–1926: Oklahoma

Basketball
- 1908–1921: Oklahoma

Baseball
- 1906–1922: Oklahoma

Administrative career (AD unless noted)
- 1907–1934: Oklahoma

Head coaching record
- Overall: 150–58–18 (football); 113–49 (basketball); 142–102–4 (baseball)

Accomplishments and honors

Championships
- 2 SWC (1915, 1918); 1 MVIAA (1920)
- College Football Hall of Fame; Inducted in 1951 (profile)

Benjamin Gilbert Owen (July 24, 1875 – February 26, 1970) was an American college football player and coach of college football, college basketball, and college baseball. He served as the head football coach at Washburn College—now known Washburn University—in 1900, Bethany College in Lindsborg, Kansas, from 1902 to 1904, and the University of Oklahoma from 1905 to 1926, compiling a career college football head coaching record of 150–58–18. Owen was also the head basketball coach at Oklahoma from 1908 to 1921, tallying a mark of 113–49, and the head baseball coach at the school from 1906 to 1922, amassing a record of 142–102–4. He was inducted into the College Football Hall of Fame as a coach in 1951.

== Early life and playing career ==
Owen was born in Chicago, in 1875, and his family moved to St. Louis, when he was 12. After he finished school, his family again moved, this time to Arkansas City, Kansas. There Owen served as an apprentice to a local doctor for three years. He then enrolled in the University of Kansas in 1897 to pursue his medical studies and he soon discovered his knack for football.

Owen played football at Kansas under two excellent, but contrasting coaches. Wylie G. Woodruff, an All American player from the University of Pennsylvania came to Kansas to coach football in the fall of 1897. Owen got a part-time job working as a medical assistant for Woodruff and it was Woodruff who encouraged Owen to try out for the Kansas football team. Owen played under Woodruff for two seasons. Woodruff specialized in a tough, hard-hitting style of football Woodruff's message to his players was "hurdle the wounded, step on the dead." Woodruff was released at the end of the 1898 season and Kansas hired Fielding H. Yost from the University of Nebraska. Unlike, Woodruff, Yost's style of football was based on innovation, speed, and cunning. Owen was the star quarterback for Yost's undefeated 1899 team.

== Coaching career ==
Upon graduating from Kansas, Owen took his first head coaching job at Washburn College. Following a one-year stint there, he spent the 1901 season as Yost's assistant at the University of Michigan. While at Michigan, he helped Yost develop the famous "Point-a-Minute" teams built around halfback Willie Heston.

Owen got his first exposure to the Oklahoma football team while head coach at Bethany College in Lindsborg, Kansas. His Bethany Swedes met and defeated two Sooner teams in 1903 and 1904. In the following offseason, the Western University of Pennsylvania looked to have Owen become the head coach of the Panthers. However, athletic director Vernon Louis Parrington hired Owen.

Owen took over the Oklahoma football team in 1905, succeeding one-year coach Fred Ewing. He stepped in and immediately turned the fledgling team around, giving Oklahoma its very first win over the rival Texas Longhorns. Owen was loved by the players as he regularly would involve himself in scrimmages when he felt his players were lagging. Owen's first two years at Oklahoma were spent back and forth between Norman and Arkansas City. Due to a reduced financial budget, Owen only remained on campus during the football season. In 1907, Owen lost his right arm in a hunting accident.

Early in Stratton D. Brooks's tenure as president of the University of Oklahoma, Owen was fired by the state legislature. They believed his salary of $3,500 (equivalent to $111,390 in 2025) was far too great for an athletics coach and used the loss of his arm as an excuse for dismissal. They recommended he be terminated and shortly thereafter, he was. However, when Brooks heard of this news, he quickly got the decision rescinded. Owens did not learn of his "dismissal" until a week after his "re-hiring."

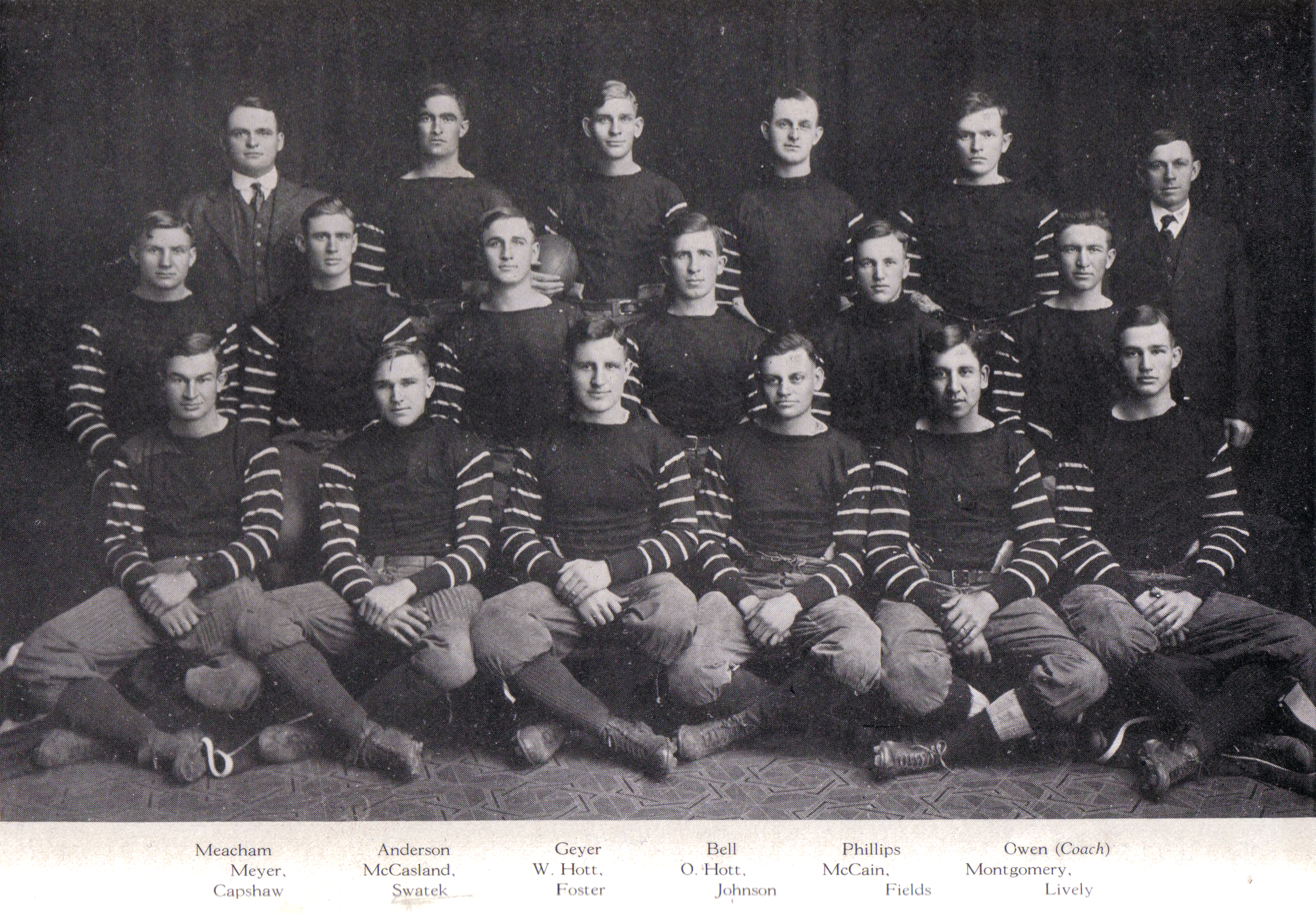
Owen's undefeated team of 1915.

Early in Owen's tenure as head coach, funding for athletic teams were very much an issue. Due to costs involved in travel, Owen's teams would regularly go out on long, grueling road trips. In 1905, his Sooners played three games in five days and in 1909 they played three games in six days. Owen is also known for introducing the forward pass to football in the Southwestern United States. This allowed his team to quickly score against lesser opponents. In 1911, his team defeated Kingfisher College, 104–0. Largely because of their accomplishments during Owen's era as head coach, the Oklahoma Sooners have scored the most points of any team in college football history. In 1,154 games through the 2009 season, the Sooners have scored 30,897 points with over 5,000 of those being contributed by Owen's teams. Owen's Sooners twice scored over 150 points in a game and won three games in 1915 by a combined score of 258–0. Owen's overall record at Oklahoma was 122–54–16. Along with Bud Wilkinson, Barry Switzer and Bob Stoops, he is one of four coaches to win over 100 games at Oklahoma. No other college football program has had more than three coaches accomplish the feat.

In addition to coaching football, Owen also spent 13 seasons as the Oklahoma men's basketball head coach. In those 13 years, he won nearly 70% of his games, had two undefeated seasons and only two losing seasons.

In 1910, Owen became an initiated member of the Delta Epsilon chapter of Sigma Nu at the University of Oklahoma. Owen had been living in the Sigma Nu chapter house's basement at 526 South University Boulevard during this time. Because he was taking several classes at the university, he was eligible to become an initiated member at the request of several of his players that had become members themselves. Owen would go onto be very active with Sigma Nu for many years, notably helping found the Epsilon Epsilon chapter of Sigma Nu at Oklahoma State University in 1920.

== Honors and death ==
While the name of the Oklahoma football stadium is the Gaylord Family Oklahoma Memorial Stadium, they originally played at Boyd Field during Owen's tenure and later moved and renamed Owen Field in his honor. The playing surface itself still retains the name Owen Field and many still refer to the stadium as a whole as such. Owen was a charter member of the College Football Hall of Fame, elected in 1951. He died February 26, 1970, in Houston, Texas, at age 94.

== Head coaching record ==
=== Football ===
Year	Team	Overall	Conference	Standing
Washburn Ichabods (Independent) (1900)
1900	Washburn	6–2		
Washburn:		6–2		
Bethany Terrible Swedes (Independent) (1902–1904)
1902	Bethany	8–1–1		
1903	Bethany	7–1–1		
1904	Bethany	7–0		
Bethany:		22–2–2		
Oklahoma Sooners (Independent) (1905–1913)
1905	Oklahoma	7–2		
1906	Oklahoma	5–2–2		
1907	Oklahoma	4–4		
1908	Oklahoma	8–1–1		
1909	Oklahoma	6–4		
1910	Oklahoma	4–2–1		
1911	Oklahoma	8–0		
1912	Oklahoma	5–4		
1913	Oklahoma	6–2		
Oklahoma Sooners (Oklahoma Intercollegiate Conference) (1914)
1914	Oklahoma	9–1–1		
Oklahoma Sooners (Southwest Conference) (1915–1919)
1915	Oklahoma	10–0	3–0	1st
1916	Oklahoma	6–5	2–1	T–3rd
1917	Oklahoma	6–4–1	1–1–1	T–3rd
1918	Oklahoma	6–0	2–0	T–1st
1919	Oklahoma	5–2–3	2–1	
Oklahoma Sooners (Missouri Valley Intercollegiate Athletic Association) (1920–1926)
1920	Oklahoma	6–0–1	4–0–1	1st
1921	Oklahoma	5–3	2–3	T–7th
1922	Oklahoma	2–3–3	1–2–2	5th
1923	Oklahoma	3–5	2–4	6th
1924	Oklahoma	2–5–1	2–3–1	6th
1925	Oklahoma	4–3–1	3–3–1	T–5th
1926	Oklahoma	5–2–1	3–2–1	5th
Oklahoma:		122–54–16	27–20–7	
Total:		150–58–18		
National championship Conference title Conference division title or championship game berth

=== Men's basketball ===
Record table
Season	Team	Overall	Conference	Standing	Postseason
Oklahoma Sooners (Independent) (1908–1919)
1908–09	Oklahoma	3–3			
1909–10	Oklahoma	8–0			
1910–11	Oklahoma	1–5			
1911–12	Oklahoma	7–2			
1912–13	Oklahoma	8–0			
1913–14	Oklahoma	7–1			
1914–15	Oklahoma	7–5			
1915–16	Oklahoma	19–7			
1916–17	Oklahoma	13–8			
1917–18	Oklahoma	11–1			
1918–19	Oklahoma	12–0			
Oklahoma (Missouri Valley Intercollegiate Athletic Association) (1919–1921)
1919–20	Oklahoma	9–7	3–7	5th	
1920–21	Oklahoma	8–10	5–9	7th	
Oklahoma:		113–49 (.698)	8–16 (.333)		
Total:		113–49 (.698)			
National champion Postseason invitational champion Conference regular season champion Conference regular season and conference tournament champion Division regular season champion Division regular season and conference tournament champion Conference tournament champion

=== Baseball ===
Record table
Season	Team	Overall	Conference	Standing	Postseason
Oklahoma Sooners (Independent) (1906–1922)
1906	Oklahoma	10–6			
1907	Oklahoma	12–5			
1909	Oklahoma	13–4			
1910	Oklahoma	11–9			
1911	Oklahoma	11–6			
1912	Oklahoma	6–6–1			
1913	Oklahoma	11–6			
1914	Oklahoma	12–7–1			
1915	Oklahoma	17–4			
1916	Oklahoma	7–9			
1918	Oklahoma	10–6			
1919	Oklahoma	6–7			
1920	Oklahoma	5–8–1			
1921	Oklahoma	6–9–1			
1922	Oklahoma	5–10			
Oklahoma:		142–102–4 (.581)			
Total:		142–102–4 (.581)			
National champion Postseason invitational champion Conference regular season champion Conference regular season and conference tournament champion Division regular season champion Division regular season and conference tournament champion Conference tournament champion
