= List of WPI Engineers men's basketball head coaches =

The following is a list of WPI Engineers men's basketball head coaches. The Engineers have had 7 coaches in their 97-season history. The team is currently coached by Chris Bartley.

Tenure	Coach	Seasons	Wins	Losses	Pct.
1917 – 21	Henry C. Swasey	4	39	15	.722
1921 – 42	Ivan Bigler	21	151	30	–
1942 – 48	Paul Stagg	6	-	-	–
1948 – 66	Charles R. McNutly	18	-	-	–
1967 – 75	Jim Herrion	8	-	-	–
1975 – 2001	Ken Kaufman	26	290	-	–
2001 – Present	Chris Bartley	15	295	112	.725
Totals	7 coaches	98 seasons	775	157	–
