= 1905 Georgia Tech Yellow Jackets baseball team =

American college baseball season

1905 Georgia Tech Yellow Jackets baseball
- Conference: Southern Intercollegiate Athletic Association
- Record: 13–4 (11–4 SIAA)
- Head coach: John Heisman

The 1905 Georgia Tech Yellow Jackets baseball team represented the Georgia Tech Yellow Jackets of the Georgia Institute of Technology in the 1905 college baseball season. Craig Day pitched 12 complete games. The game of the year was the victory over Duke and Arthur Bradsher.

== Schedule and results ==
Legend
Georgia Tech win
Georgia Tech loss

1905 Georgia Tech Yellow Jackets baseball game log
Regular season

April
Date	Opponent	Site/stadium	Score	Win	Loss	Save	Attendance	Overall record	SIAA record
Apr 8	Georgia	Brisbane Park • Atlanta, GA	W 11–3					1–0	
Apr 10	Trinity	Brisbane Park • Atlanta, GA	W 3–2^{12}	Craig Day	Arthur Bradsher			2–0	
Apr 14	Newberry	Brisbane Park • Atlanta, GA	W 4–3					3–0	
Apr 15	Newberry	Brisbane Park • Atlanta, GA	W 6–2					4–0	
Apr 22	Clemson	Brisbane Park • Atlanta, GA	W 5–4					5–0	
Apr 22	Clemson	Brisbane Park • Atlanta, GA	L 3–5					5–1	
Apr 27	Georgia	Brisbane Park • Atlanta, GA	W 2–1					6–1	
Apr 29	Mercer	Brisbane Park • Atlanta, GA	W 9–2 (Note: Exhibition)						

May
Date	Opponent	Site/stadium	Score	Win	Loss	Save	Attendance	Overall record	SIAA record
May 5	Auburn	Brisbane Park • Atlanta, GA	L 0–1					6–2	
May 6	Auburn	Brisbane Park • Atlanta, GA	L 2–4					6–3	
May 10	at Georgia	Herty Field • Athens, GA	W 11–2					7–3	
May 12	at Mercer	Macon, GA	W 5–3					8–3	
May 13	at Mercer	Macon, GA	W 2–0					9–3	
May 20	Mercer	Brisbane Park • Atlanta, GA	W 10–4					10–3	
May 27	Georgia	Brisbane Park • Atlanta, GA	W 4–3					11–3	

June
Date	Opponent	Site/stadium	Score	Win	Loss	Save	Attendance	Overall record	SIAA record
June 1	Sewanee	Brisbane Park • Atlanta, GA	W 8–0					12–3	
June 2	Sewanee	Brisbane Park • Atlanta, GA	L 4–9					12–4	
June 3	Sewanee	Brisbane Park • Atlanta, GA	W 4–2					13–4	
