= 1907 Georgia Tech Yellow Jackets baseball team =

American college baseball season

1907 Georgia Tech Yellow Jackets baseball
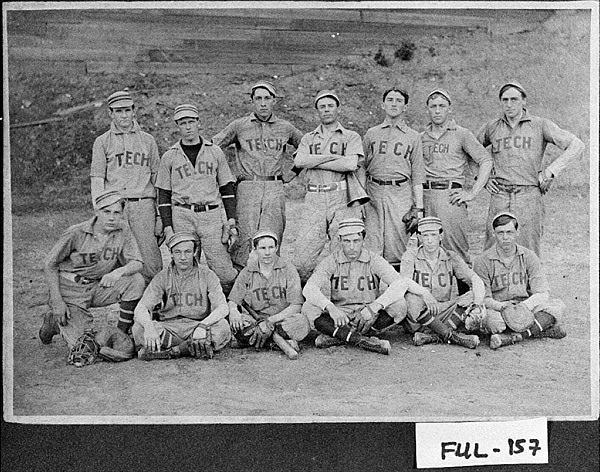
- Conference: Southern Intercollegiate Athletic Association
- Record: 10–5–1 (10–5–1 SIAA)
- Head coach: John Heisman

The 1907 Georgia Tech Yellow Jackets baseball team represented the Georgia Tech Yellow Jackets of the Georgia Institute of Technology in the 1907 IAAUS baseball season. The team featured pitcher Ed Lafitte.

== Schedule and results ==
Legend
Georgia Tech win
Georgia Tech loss
Tie

1906 Georgia Tech Yellow Jackets baseball game log
Regular Season

March/April
Date	Opponent	Site/stadium	Score	Win	Loss	Save	Attendance	Overall record	SIAA record
Mar 30	Mercer	Brisbane Park • Atlanta, GA	W 1–0					1–0	1–0
Apr 3	at Georgia	Herty Field • Athens, GA	W 3–1					2–0	2–0
Apr 5	Clemson	Brisbane Park • Atlanta, GA	W 4–2					3–0	3–0
Apr 6	Clemson	Brisbane Park • Atlanta, GA	T 2–2^{11}					3–0–1	3–0–1
Apr 13	at Mercer	Macon, GA	W 1–0^{11}	Ed Lafitte				4–0–1	4–0–1
Apr 19	Sewanee	Brisbane Park • Atlanta, GA	L 3–6					4–1–1	4–1–1
Apr 20	Sewanee	Brisbane Park • Atlanta, GA	W 5–3					5–1–1	5–1–1
Apr 21	Sewanee	Brisbane Park • Atlanta, GA	W 7–4^{8}					6–1–1	6–1–1
Apr 25	at Vanderbilt	Curry Field • Nashville, TN	L 0–6					6–2–1	6–2–1
Apr 26	at Vanderbilt	Curry Field • Nashville, TN	L 5–6					6–3–1	6–3–1
Apr 27	at Vanderbilt	Curry Field • Nashville, TN	W 3–2					7–3–1	7–3–1

May
Date	Opponent	Site/stadium	Score]	Win	Loss	Save	Attendance	Overall record	SIAA record
May 4	Dahlonega* (Note: Exhibition)	Brisbane Park • Atlanta, GA	W 9–1						
May 10	at Auburn	Auburn Athletic Field • Auburn, AL	L 2–3					7–4–1	7–4–1
May 11	at Auburn	Auburn Athletic Field • Auburn, AL	W 2–0^{12}					8–4–1	8–4–1
May 12	at Auburn	Auburn Athletic Field • Auburn, AL	L 1–4^{7}					8–5–1	8–5–1
May 17	Georgia	Brisbane Park • Atlanta, GA	W 4–1					9–5–1	9–5–1
May 18	Georgia	Brisbane Park • Atlanta, GA	W 9–0 (Note: Forfeit)					10–5–1	10–5–1
