= 1905 Auburn Tigers baseball team =

American college baseball season

1905 Auburn Tigers baseball

SIAA Champion
- Conference: Southern Intercollegiate Athletic Association
- Record: 9–3 (7–2 SIAA)

The 1905 Auburn Tigers baseball team represented the Auburn Tigers of the Auburn University in the 1905 college baseball season.

== Schedule ==
Legend
	Auburn win
	Auburn loss
*	Non-Conference game

1905 Auburn Tigers baseball game log
Regular season

March/April
Date	Opponent	Site/stadium	Score	Overall record	SIAA record
Mar 30	at Mercer	Macon, GA	L 1–3	0–1	0–1
Apr 1	at Mercer	Macon, GA	W 5–2	1–1	1–1
Apr 6	at Southern (AL)*		W 6–3	2–1	
Apr 7	at Southern (AL)*		L 2–4	2–2	
Apr 8	at Southern (AL)*		W 5–2	3–2	
Apr 13	Alabama	Auburn Athletic Field • Auburn, AL	L 2–3	3–3	1–2
Apr 14	Alabama	Auburn Athletic Field • Auburn, AL	W 4–3	4–3	2–2
Apr 15	Alabama	Auburn Athletic Field • Auburn, AL	W 6–5	5–3	3–2
Apr 24	Mercer	Auburn Athletic Field • Auburn, AL	W 12–7	6–3	4–2
Apr 27	Georgia	Auburn Athletic Field • Auburn, AL	W 2–0	7–3	5–2

May
Date	Opponent	Site/stadium	Score	Overall record	SIAA record
May 5	Georgia Tech	Auburn Athletic Field • Auburn, AL	W 1–0	8–3	6–2
May 6	Georgia Tech	Auburn Athletic Field • Auburn, AL	W 4–2	9–3	7–2
