= Frank B. Anderson =

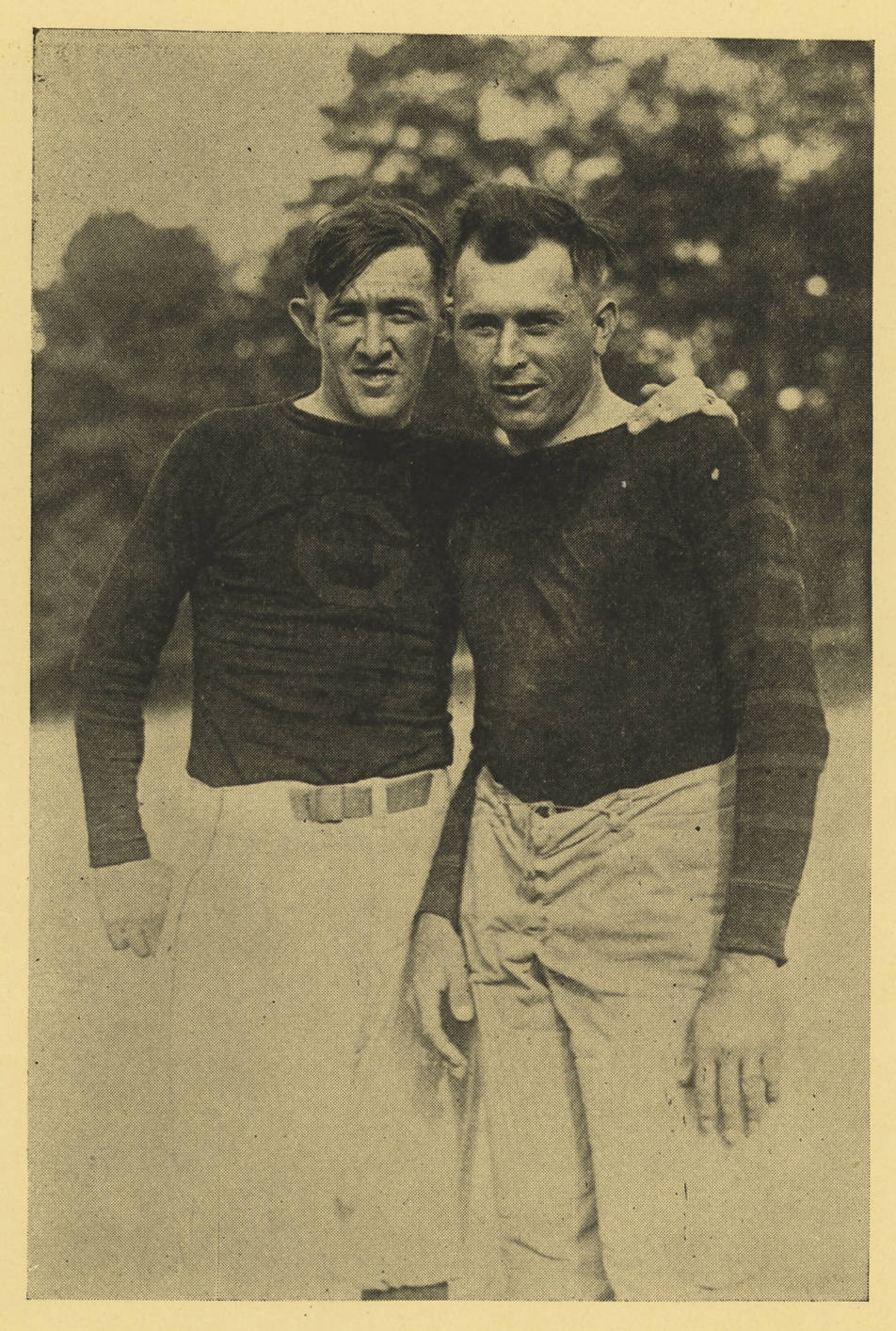
- Anderson on the left next to Kirby Malone

Biographical details
- Born: June 16, 1882; Powder Springs, Georgia, U.S.
- Died: November 8, 1966 (aged 84); Albany, Georgia, U.S.

Playing career

Baseball
- 1903–1904: Georgia
- Position: Second baseman

Coaching career (HC unless noted)

Football
- 1904: University School for Boys (assistant)
- 1905: University School for Boys
- 1906–1907: Robert E. Lee Institute
- 1908–1909: Gordon Military Institute
- 1910–1911: Georgia (assistant)
- 1917–1919: Oglethorpe

Baseball
- 1910–1913: Georgia
- 1916–1944: Oglethorpe

Head coaching record
- Overall: 8–11–1 (college football)

Accomplishments and honors

Awards
- Oglethorpe Athletic Hall of Fame; Atlanta Sports Hall of Fame

Frank Butner Anderson (June 16, 1882 – November 8, 1966) was an American college football, and baseball coach as well as athletic director. He was the first football and baseball coach in the history of Oglethorpe University and the namesake of its baseball field. The field was dedicated as such on May 11, 1963. Anderson was inducted into the Oglethorpe Athletic Hall of Fame, a member of its inaugural class of 1962. He always wore his baseball uniform to practice and to games. He is known by some as the "Dean of Southern Baseball Coaches." Frank is the father of Alf Anderson.

== Early years ==
Frank Anderson was born on June 16, 1882, on a family farm near Powder Springs in Cobb County, Georgia.

=== University of Georgia ===
In 1900 he enrolled at the University of Georgia (UGA) in Athens. He played three years of varsity baseball and was All-Southern second baseman in 1903 and 1904, when he captained the team. He was selected All-Southern by John Heisman. He once hit a two out, ninth inning home run to tie rival Georgia Tech. Anderson played in the backfield on Georgia's football team. He also was a star on the Track and Field team and held the UGA record in the 220 and 440 for 30 years.

== Coaching years ==
=== Prep school ===
After university, Anderson began teaching mathematics and coaching baseball at various high schools around Atlanta, Georgia. He won a state championship with the University School for Boys at Stone Mountain, Georgia in his first year. He also assisted the football team as an assistant under former Clemson player Hope Sadler. He also coached at the Robert E Lee Institute of Thomaston, Georgia and at the Gordon Military Institute.

=== Georgia ===
Anderson returned to Georgia to coach his alma mater's baseball teams from 1910 to 1913. He won consecutive Southern Intercollegiate Athletic Association championships in 1911 and 1912.

=== Oglethorpe ===
Anderson established the football and baseball programs for Oglethorpe University in 1917. He was the football coach until 1919. He was the baseball coach until 1944. Amongst his baseball players were Luke Appling and Jay Partridge.

== Head coaching record ==
=== College football ===
Year	Team	Overall	Conference	Standing	Bowl/playoffs
Oglethorpe Stormy Petrels (Independent) (1917–1919)
1917	Oglethorpe	1–2			
1918	Oglethorpe	5–3			
1919	Oglethorpe	2–6–1			
Oglethorpe:		8–11–1			
Total:		8–11–1			
