= 1893 Virginia Cavaliers baseball team =

American college baseball season

1893 Virginia Cavaliers baseball

Southern Champion
- Conference: Independent
- Record: 10–5–1

The 1893 Virginia Cavaliers baseball team represented the Virginia Cavaliers of the University of Virginia in the 1893 college baseball season.

The Cavaliers advanced to the first national championship event for college baseball, held at the Chicago World's Fair and pitting top teams from the East, South, and West. Virginia defeated three other schools for the opportunity to face the top teams from New England. They finished third in that event, but were widely considered the second-best team in the tournament.

== Schedule ==
Legend
Virginia win
Virginia loss
Tie

1893 Virginia Cavaliers baseball game log
Regular season

April
Date	Opponent	Site/stadium	Score	Overall record
Apr 1	vs Yale	Richmond, VA	L 8–14	0–1
Apr 3	Yale	Charlottesville, VA	L 4–11	0–2
	Harvard		T 1–1	0–2–1
	Vermont		W 6–5	1–2–1
	Vermont		L 4–7	1–3–1
	North Carolina		W 5–2	2–3–1
	Lafayette		W 11–2	3–3–1
	Lafayette		W 15–4	4–3–1
	Sewanee		W 13–5	5–3–1
	Randolph-Macon		W 16–0	6–3–1

Postseason

Southern and Western Champions
Date	Opponent	Site/stadium	Score	Overall record	Tournament record
June 26	Illinois	Chicago, IL	W 11–7	7–3–1	1–0
June 29	Wisconsin	Chicago, IL	W 14–4	8–3–1	2–0
July 1	Illinois	Chicago, IL	W 11–7	9–3–1	3–0

World's Columbian Exposition
Date	Opponent	Site/stadium	Score	Overall record	Tournament record
July 6	Wesleyan	Chicago, IL	W 6–0	10–3–1	4–0
July 11	Amherst	Chicago, IL	L 6–8	10–4–1	4–1
July 12	Yale	Chicago, IL	L 2–6	10–5–1	4–2
