= 1904 Trinity Blue and White baseball team =

American college baseball season

1904 Trinity Blue and White baseball

SIAA champion
- Conference: Southern Intercollegiate Athletic Association
- Record: 14–3–2 (3–1–1 SIAA)
- Head coach: Otis Stocksdale
- Captain: Arthur Bradsher
- Home stadium: Hanes Field

The 1904 Trinity Blue and White baseball team represented the Trinity Blue and White baseball team of Trinity College in the 1904 college baseball season. The team was led by left-handed pitcher Arthur Bradsher's 13 wins. Chadwick led the team in batting average with .338

== Schedule and results ==
Legend
	Trinity win
	Trinity loss
	Tie
*	Non-Conference game

1904 Trinity Blue and White baseball game log

Regular Season
Date	Opponent	Site/stadium	Score	Win	Loss	Save	Attendance	Overall record	SIAA record
March 15	Trinity Park HS	Hanes Field • Durham, NC	W 9–1	Arthur Bradsher				1–0	
March 18	Oak Ridge	Hanes Field • Durham, NC	W 9–1	Arthur Bradsher				2–0	
March 26	Guilford	Hanes Field • Durham, NC	W 17–2	Arthur Bradsher (Note: Bradsher threw no-hitters for 25 innings against Trinity Park, Oak Ridge, and seven innings of the Guilford contest.)				3–0	
March 29	Lafayette	Hanes Field • Durham, NC	W 7–2	Arthur Bradsher				4–0	
	Maryland		L 5–9		Paul Webb			4–1	
April 2	Syracuse	Hanes Field • Durham, NC	W 4–1	Arthur Bradsher				5–1	
April 4	Gettysburg	Hanes Field • Durham, NC	W 6–1	Arthur Bradsher	Eddie Plank			6–1	
	Gettysburg	Hanes Field • Durham, NC	W 6–4					7–1	
April 6	Guilford	Hanes Field • Durham, NC	W 2–1	Arthur Bradsher				8–1	
April 20	Wake Forest	Raleigh, NC	W 11–9	Arthur Bradsher				9–1	
April 23	Wake Forest	Hanes Field • Durham, NC	W 1–0	Arthur Bradsher				10–1	
April 26	North Carolina A&M	Raleigh, NC	L 4–5		Arthur Bradsher			10–2	
April 29	North Carolina A&M	Hanes Field • Durham, NC	W 10–2	Arthur Bradsher				11–2	
	at Wofford	Spartanburg, SC	W 4–3					12–2	1–0
May 5	at Wofford	Spartanburg, SC	T 3–3					12–2–1	1–0–1
May 6	at Furman	Greenville, SC	W 3–1	Arthur Bradsher				13–2–1	2–0–1
May 6	at Clemson	Bowman Field • Calhoun, SC	L 8–14		Wooten/Paul Webb			13–3–1	2–1–1
May 9	vs Wake Forest	New Athletic Park • Raleigh, NC	T 4–4					13–3–2	2–1–1
May 10	Wofford	Hanes Field • Durham, NC	W 6–0	Arthur Bradsher				14–3–2	3–1–1

== Players ==
- Arthur Bradsher - pitcher
- Chadwick - catcher
- Frank R. Wrenn - catcher
- Bynum - first base
- Brown - second base
- Smith - shortstop
- Paul Webb - third base
- Howard - outfield
- Wooten - center field
- N. S. Justus - outfield
- Elliott - utility
