= 1906 Georgia Tech Yellow Jackets baseball team =

American college baseball season

1906 Georgia Tech Yellow Jackets baseball
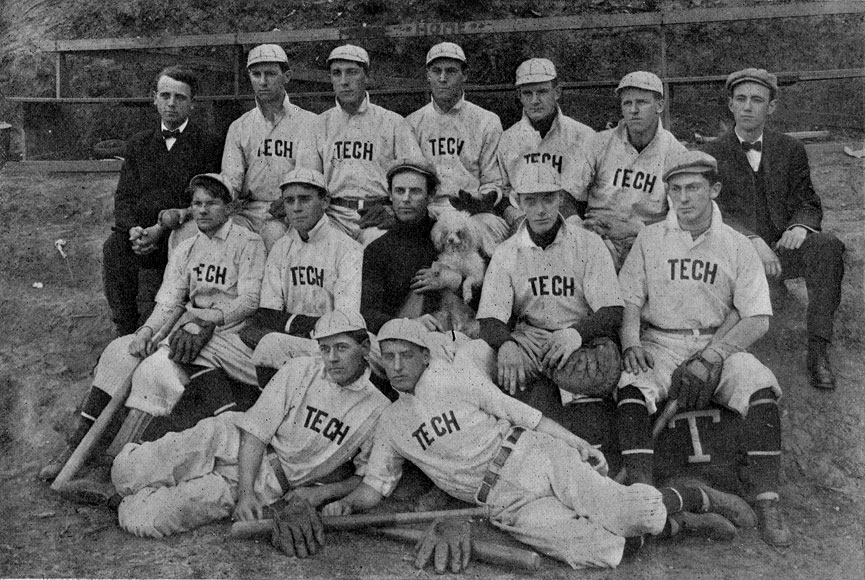

SIAA champion
- Conference: Southern Intercollegiate Athletic Association
- Record: 23–3 (16–2 SIAA)
- Head coach: John Heisman
- Captain: Chip Robert

The 1906 Georgia Tech Yellow Jackets baseball team represented the Georgia Tech Yellow Jackets of the Georgia Institute of Technology in the 1906 college baseball season. Star players in 1906 included captain and outfielder Chip Robert, shortstop Tommy McMillan, and pitchers Ed Lafitte and Craig Day.

== Schedule and results ==
Legend
Georgia Tech win
Georgia Tech loss
Tie

1906 Georgia Tech Yellow Jackets baseball game log
Regular Season

March
Date	Opponent	Site/stadium	Score	Win	Loss	Save	Attendance	Overall record	SIAA record
March 24	Clemson	Brisbane Park • Atlanta, GA	W 3–1					1–0	1–0
March 29	Cleveland Indians	Brisbane Park • Atlanta, GA	L 4–16 (Note: Exhibition)					1–0	1–0
March 30	at Mercer	Macon, GA	W 14–1					2–0	2–0
March 31	at Mercer	Macon, GA	W 3–0					3–0	3–0

April
Date	Opponent	Site/stadium	Score	Win	Loss	Save	Attendance	Overall record	SIAA record
April 4	at Georgia	Herty Field • Athens, GA	L 3–4					3–1	3–1
April 6	Trinity	Brisbane Park • Atlanta, GA	L 0–10					3–2	3–2
April 7	Trinity	Brisbane Park • Atlanta, GA	W 5–1					4–2	4–2
April 12	Vanderbilt	Brisbane Park • Atlanta, GA	W 5–1					5–2	5–2
April 13	Vanderbilt	Brisbane Park • Atlanta, GA	W 5–4					6–2	6–2
April 14	Vanderbilt	Brisbane Park • Atlanta, GA	W 2–1					7–2	7–2
April 18	at Georgia	Herty Field • Athens, GA	W 5–4					8–2	8–2
April 20	Furman	Brisbane Park • Atlanta, GA	W 1–0					9–2	9–2
April 21	Furman	Brisbane Park • Atlanta, GA	W 4–3					10–2	10–2
April 27	Mercer	Brisbane Park • Atlanta, GA	W 4–3					11–2	11–2
April 28	Mercer	Brisbane Park • Atlanta, GA	W 2–0					12–2	12–2
April 30	at Clemson	Bowman Field • Calhoun, SC	W 6–0					13–2	13–2

May
Date	Opponent	Site/stadium	Score	Win	Loss	Save	Attendance	Overall record	SIAA record
May 1	at Furman	Greenville, SC	W 7–4					14–2	14–2
May 2	at Wofford	Spartanburg, SC	W 3–1					15–2	15–2
May 3	at Bingham		L 4–8 (Note: Exhibition)					15–2	15–2
May 4	Auburn	Brisbane Park • Atlanta, GA	L 1–2^{11}					15–3	15–3
May 11	Auburn	Brisbane Park • Atlanta, GA	W 5–0					16–3	16–3
May 12	Auburn	Brisbane Park • Atlanta, GA	W 4–0^{8}					17–3	17–3
May 12	at Tennessee	Waite Field • Knoxville, TN	W 3–2					18–3	18–3
May 18	Georgia	Brisbane Park • Atlanta, GA	W 9–1					19–3	19–3
May 19	Georgia	Brisbane Park • Atlanta, GA	W 3–2	Ed Lafitte				20–3	20–3
May 24	Cumberland	Brisbane Park • Atlanta, GA	W 11–0					21–3	21–3
May 26	Wofford	Brisbane Park • Atlanta, GA	W 7–1					22–3	22–3
May 26	Wofford	Brisbane Park • Atlanta, GA	W 7–0					23–3	23–3
