= Amos Alonzo Stagg Jr. =

American football player and coach (1899–1996)

Biographical details
- Born: April 11, 1899; Chicago, Illinois, U.S.
- Died: May 17, 1996 (aged 97); Grand Rapids, Michigan, U.S.

Playing career

Football
- 1918–1922: Chicago
- Position: Quarterback

Coaching career (HC unless noted)

Football
- 1924–1934: Chicago (assistant)
- 1935–1954: Susquehanna

Basketball
- 1935–1951: Susquehanna

Head coaching record
- Overall: 45–69–7 (football); 115–149 (basketball)

Amos Alonzo "Lonnie" Stagg Jr. (April 11, 1899 – May 17, 1996), sometimes called Young Stagg, was an American football player and coach of college football and basketball.

== Biography ==
Stagg was born in 1899 in Chicago. His father, Amos Alonzo Stagg (1862–1965), was the football coach at the University of Chicago from 1892 to 1932. Stagg played football as a quarterback under his father on the Chicago Maroons football team in the early 1920s, graduating from Chicago in 1923. His younger brother, Paul Stagg, also played quarterback at Chicago under their father and was a later a college football coach and athletics administrator.

Stagg began his career as a coach in 1924 at Chicago serving under his father. When his father left the University of Chicago in 1933, Stagg retained his post there. In 1935, he was hired as the head football coach at Susquehanna University. He served as Susquehanna's head football coach from 1935 to 1942 and from 1946 to 1954, compiling a record of 45–69–7. He coached Susquehanna's football team to undefeated seasons in both 1940 and 1951. Stagg was also the head basketball coach at Susquehanna from 1935 to 1951, tallying a mark of 115–149. Stagg also served as Susquehanna's athletic director, track and tennis coach, director of the intramural program and an instructor of physical education and health.

Stagg twice coached against his brother Paul. In 1935, Amos Jr.'s Susquehanna Crusaders and Paul's Moravian Greyhounds played to a 0–0 tie in Bethlehem, Pennsylvania. The following year, Moravian beat Susquehanna, 26–16, in Selinsgrove. His wife's name was Arvilla.

Stagg retired from coaching in February 1955. He announced at the time that he would thereafter devote his efforts to Susquehanna's intramural and physical education programs.

In 1981, when his father's status as the all-time winningest college football coach was threatened by Bear Bryant, Stagg petitioned the NCAA to transfer 21 of his coaching victories at Susquehanna to his father. Stagg and his father had coached the Susquehanna team together from 1947 to 1952. The NCAA denied the request, but Young Stagg told the press that the credit belonged to his father: "Of course he deserves them. We were co-equals but he was in charge. Everybody knew that." During the years in question, Susquehanna sent its records to the NCAA listing Young Stagg as the head coach, but some programs and guides listed the two as "co-coaches" or identified Stagg Sr. as an "advisory coach."

Stagg died in 1996 at age 97. His last residence was in Grand Rapids, Michigan.
