= 1893 Yale Bulldogs baseball team =

American college baseball season

1893 Yale Bulldogs baseball
- Conference: Independent
- Record: 18–12–1
- Captain: Laurence T. Bliss

The 1893 Yale Bulldogs baseball team represented Yale University in the 1893 college baseball season. The Bulldogs competed as an Independent, with a student manager.

The Bulldogs advanced to the first national championship event for college baseball, held at the Chicago World's Fair and pitting top teams from the East, South, and West. Yale won the tournament, defeating Amherst in the final game 9–0.

== Roster ==
1947 Yale Bulldogs roster
| Pitchers: Walter F. Carter; Catchers | Infielders | Outfielders | Position Unknown: Thomas S. Arbuthnot; Morris H. Beall; Laurence T. Bliss; George B. Case; Benjamin Davis; John C. Greenway; Gilbert L. Hedges; John H. Kezie; William H. Murphy; F. Rustin; John B. Speer; Frank B. Stephenson; Noah H. Swayne |

== Schedule ==
Legend
| Yale win |
| Yale loss |
| Tie |

1893 Yale Bulldogs baseball game log
Regular season
March (1–1)

| Date | Opponent | Site/stadium | Score | Overall record |
|---|---|---|---|---|
| March 30 | at Penn | Franklin Field • Philadelphia, PA | L 6-11 | 0–1 |
| March 31 | at Washington YMCA | Washington, DC | W 13-8 | 1–1 |

April (5–5–1)

| Date | Opponent | Site/stadium | Score | Overall record |
|---|---|---|---|---|
| April 1 | vs Virginia | Richmond, VA | W 14–8 | 2–1 |
| April 3 | at Virginia | Charlottesville, VA | W 11–4 | 3–1 |
| April 4 | at Johns Hopkins | Baltimore, MD | T 7–7 | 3–1–1 |
| April 5 | at Penn | Franklin Field • Philadelphia, PA | W 8–7 | 4–1–1 |
| April 10 | Boston University | New Haven, CT | L 5–8^{8} | 4–2–1 |
| April 14 | Dartmouth | New Haven, CT | W 7–0^{7} | 5–2–1 |
| April 17 | at New York League | New York, NY | L 4–10 | 5–3–1 |
| April 19 | at New York A.C. | New York, NY | L 4–6 | 5–4–1 |
| April 22 | at Brooklyn | Brooklyn, NY | L 6–13 | 5–5–1 |
| April 26 | at NYU | New York, NY | L 0–9 | 5–6–1 |
| April 29 | at Williams | Williamstown, MA | W 10–0 | 6–6–1 |

May (8–2)

| Date | Opponent | Site/stadium | Score | Overall record |
|---|---|---|---|---|
| May 2 | Brown | New Haven, CT | W 7–0 | 7–6–1 |
| May 6 | Penn | New Haven, CT | W 5–4 | 8–6–1 |
| May 8 | at Wesleyan | Middletown, CT | L 2–4 | 8–7–1 |
| May 10 | at Brown | Providence, RI | L 0–2^{11} | 8–8–1 |
| May 13 | at Orange (N.J.) A.C. | Orange, NJ | W 13–6 | 9–8–1 |
| May 15 | Amherst | New Haven, CT | W 6–3 | 10–8–1 |
| May 20 | Princeton | New Haven, CT | W 5–1 | 11–8–1 |
| May 24 | Wesleyan | New Haven, CT | W 3–2 | 12–8–1 |
| May 30 | Orange (N.J.) A.C. | New Haven, CT | W 16–9 | 13–8–1 |
| May 31 | at Phillips Academy | Andover, MA | W 2–0 | 14–8–1 |

June/July (4–4)

| Date | Opponent | Site/stadium | Score | Overall record |
|---|---|---|---|---|
| June 3 | at Amherst | Amherst, MA | L 1–5 | 14–9–1 |
| June 7 | Phillips Academy | New Haven, CT | W 6–2 | 15–9–1 |
| June 10 | at Princeton | Princeton, NJ | W 2–0 | 16–9–1 |
| June 13 | Vermont | New Haven, CT | L 3–4 | 16–10–1 |
| June 17 | vs Princeton | New York, NY | W 14–7 | 17–10–1 |
| June 24 | at Harvard | Holmes Field • Cambridge, MA | L 2–3^{10} | 17–11–1 |
| June 27 | Harvard | New Haven, CT | W 3–0 | 18–11–1 |
| July 1 | vs Harvard | New York, NY | L 4–6 | 18–12–1 |

Postseason
Chicago World's Fair

| Date | Opponent | Site/stadium | Score | Overall record | Tournament Record | | | |
|---|---|---|---|---|---|---|---|---|
| July 4 | | {{{tv}}} | vs. Vermont | Chicago, IL | L 12–14 | {{{win}}} | 18–13–1 | 0–1 |
| July 11 | | {{{tv}}} | vs. Vermont | Chicago, IL | W 2–1 | {{{win}}} | 19–13–1 | 1–1 |
| July 12 | | {{{tv}}} | vs. Virginia | Chicago, IL | W 6–2 | {{{win}}} | 20–13–1 | 2–1 |
| July 14 | | {{{tv}}} | vs. Amherst | Chicago, IL | W 1–0 | {{{win}}} | 21–13–1 | 3–1 |
| July 15 | | {{{tv}}} | vs. Amherst | Chicago, IL | W 9–0 | {{{win}}} | 22–13–1 | 4–1 |
