= 1893 college baseball season =

- Champions: Yale (N/A title)
- Runners-up: Amherst

Seasons
- ← 1892 1894 →

The 1893 college baseball season, play of college baseball in the United States began in the spring of 1893. Play largely consisted of regional matchups, some organized by conferences, and ended in June. For the first and only time prior to 1947, a national championship event was organized by Amos Alonzo Stagg. With competition at the Chicago World's Fair, the champions of the East, South, and West met, with Yale defeating Amherst 9–0 in the final game.

== New programs ==
- LSU, Navy, Ole Miss, and Oregon Agricultural (now Oregon State) began varsity play for the first time.

== Chicago World's Fair Tournament ==
The champions of the West and South played a double-elimination tournament prior to the arrival of teams from the East (New England).

First Round
Virginia	11
Illinois	7
Wisconsin
Vanderbilt
Lower round 1
Illinois	6
Vanderbilt	2

Semi-Finals
Virginia	14
Wisconsin	4
Lower final
Wisconsin	10
Illinois	17

Finals
Virginia	11	—
Illinois	7	—

A second bracket consisting of Virginia and the four teams from New England followed next, with several games played at South Side Park.

First round
Amherst	8
Wesleyan	7
Vermont	14
Yale	12

Second round
Virginia	6
Wesleyan	0
Amherst
Vermont

Third round
Virginia	6
Amherst	8
Vermont	1
Yale	2

Semifinals
Virginia	2
Yale	6

Final
Amherst	0	0
Yale	1	9

School	W	L	Pct
Yale	4	1	.800
Virginia	4	2	.667
Amherst	3	2	.600
Illinois	2	2	.500
Vermont	1	2	.333
Wisconsin	1	2	.333
Wesleyan	0	2	.000
Vanderbilt	0	2	.000
