= Daniel Dougherty (coach) =

American football/basketball player and coach

Biographical details
- Born: November 11, 1883; Iowa City, Iowa, U.S.
- Died: 1967; Hazleton, Pennsylvania

Playing career

Football
- 1905–1906: Washington & Jefferson
- 1907: Chicago

Basketball
- 1903: Duquesne

Coaching career (HC unless noted)

Football
- 1908: St. Ignatius College Prep (IL)
- 1909: Grinnell

Basketball
- 1909–1910: Grinnell

Head coaching record
- Overall: 2–5–1 (college football); 12–1 (college basketball)

Daniel B. Dougherty (November 11, 1883 – 1967) was an American college football and basketball player and coach. He served as the head football coach at Grinnell College in 1909, compiling a record of 2–5–1.
