= Paul Stagg =

American football player, coach, and administrator (1909–1992)

Biographical details
- Born: March 18, 1909; Chicago, Illinois, U.S.
- Died: September 4, 1992 (aged 83); South Holland, Illinois, U.S.

Playing career

Football
- 1929–1931: Chicago
- Position: Quarterback

Coaching career (HC unless noted)

Football
- 1932: Chicago (assistant)
- 1933: Pacific (CA) (freshmen)
- 1934–1936: Moravian
- 1937–1940: Springfield
- 1941–1946: Worcester Tech
- 1947–1960: Pacific (OR)

Basketball
- 1935–1937: Moravian

Baseball
- 1935–1936: Moravian

Administrative career (AD unless noted)
- 1934–1937: Moravian
- 1947–1961: Pacific (OR)
- 1961–1967: Pacific (CA)

Head coaching record
- Overall: 94–99–12 (football); 15–5 (basketball); 12–8 (baseball)
- Bowls: 2–0

Accomplishments and honors

Championships
- 3 NWC (1949, 1951–1952)

Paul Stagg (March 18, 1909 – September 4, 1992) was an American football player, coach, and college athletics administrator. He served as the head football coach at Moravian College (1934–1936), Springfield College (1937–1940), Worcester Polytechnic Institute (1941–1946), and Pacific University in Forest Grove, Oregon (1946–1960), compiling a career college football record of 94–99–12. Stagg played football as a quarterback at the University of Chicago, where his father, Amos Alonzo Stagg, was the head coach. He was an assistant coach under his father at Chicago in the fall of 1932 before graduating in December with a Bachelor of Science, majoring in geography. He followed the elder Stagg in 1933 to the University of the Pacific in Stockton, California, where he served as an assistant coach for a season before taking the head coaching job at Moravian. Paul Stagg returned to the University of the Pacific in 1961 as director of physical education and intercollegiate athletics, a capacity in which he served until 1967.

Stagg's older brother, Amos Jr., also played quarterback at Chicago under their father and was a later the head football coach at Susquehanna University. The two brothers coached against one another twice. In 1935, Amos Jr.'s Susquehanna Crusaders and Paul's Moravian Greyhounds played to a 0–0 tie in Bethlehem, Pennsylvania. The following year, Moravian beat Susquehanna, 26–16, in Selinsgrove.

== Marriage and graduate study ==
Stagg was married on August 13, 1934, to Virginia Russell in Chicago. He received a Master of Arts degree in physical education from Columbia University that June. In the spring of 1947, he received a PhD in physical education from New York University.

== Head coaching record ==
=== Football ===
Year	Team	Overall	Conference	Standing	Bowl/playoffs
Moravian Greyhounds (Independent) (1934–1936)
1934	Moravian	3–3–1			
1935	Moravian	4–2–1			
1936	Moravian	5–1			
Moravian:		12–6–2			
Springfield Gymnasts (Independent) (1937–1940)
1937	Springfield	1–8			
1938	Springfield	4–2–1			
1939	Springfield	4–3–1			
1940	Springfield	2–6			
Springfield:		11–19–2			
Worcester Tech Engineers (Independent) (1941–1946)
1941	Worcester Tech	0–6			
1942	Worcester Tech	0–6			
1943	Worcester Tech	4–2			
1944	Worcester Tech	2–2–2			
1945	Worcester Tech	0–5			
1946	Worcester Tech	0–2			
Worcester Tech:		6–23–2			
Pacific Badgers (Northwest Conference) (1947–1960)
1947	Pacific	6–2	5–2	2nd	
1948	Pacific	5–3–1	5–2	2nd	
1949	Pacific	8–1–1	4–1–1	T–1st	W Pear
1950	Pacific	7–2	3–2	T–2nd	
1951	Pacific	8–2	4–1	T–1st	W Pear
1952	Pacific	7–0–1	4–0–1	T–1st	
1953	Pacific	2–4–2	0–4–1	6th	
1954	Pacific	3–4	1–4	T–4th	
1955	Pacific	4–4	2–3	T–3rd	
1956	Pacific	3–6	1–4	6th	
1957	Pacific	2–7	0–5	6th	
1958	Pacific	1–7–1	0–4–1	6th	
1959	Pacific	4–5	2–3	T–4th	
1960	Pacific	5–4	2–3	4th	
Pacific:		65–51–6	33–38–4		
Total:		94–99–12			
National championship Conference title Conference division title or championship game berth
