= 1904 college baseball season =

Seasons
- ← 1903 1905 →

The 1904 college baseball season, play of college baseball in the United States began in the spring of 1904. Play largely consisted of regional matchups, some organized by conferences, and ended in June. No national championship event was held until 1947.

== Conference winners ==
This is a partial list of conference champions from the 1904 season.

Conference	Regular season winner
Big Nine	Illinois
SIAA	Trinity

== Conference standings ==
The following is an incomplete list of conference standings:

1904 Western Conference baseball standings
	Conf.				Overall
Team	W		L	PCT	W		L	PCT
Illinois ‍†‍‍	8	–	2	.800		–		–
Wisconsin ‍‍‍	4	–	2	.667		–		–
Chicago ‍‍‍	8	–	7	.533		–		–
Michigan ‍‍‍	4	–	5	.444		–		–
Northwestern ‍‍‍	0	–	8	.000		–		–
† – Conference champion
