= Arthur Bradsher =

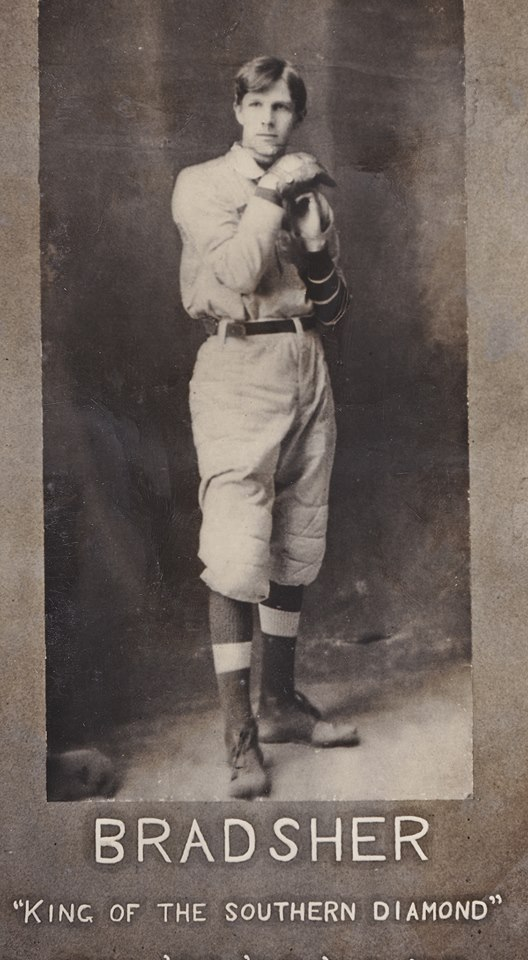
- Trinity College Baseball
- Pitcher
- Born: January 10, 1883; Roxboro, North Carolina
- Died: January 27, 1951 (aged 68); Beaufort, North Carolina
- Batted: Left Threw: Left

Arthur Brown Bradsher (January 10, 1883 – January 27, 1951) was a college baseball player and tobacco businessman. He was a left-handed pitcher for the Trinity College (now Duke University) baseball team in the Deadball Era. Bradsher was most notable for his 582 strikeouts, 15 shutouts, and five no-hitters achieved during his college career between 1901 and 1905.

== Early years ==
Bradsher was born on January 17, 1883, in Roxboro, North Carolina. His father Charles E. Bradsher was a doctor, and died when Arthur was just four years old. His mother Nancy Malone married O. T. Carver after Charles died.

== Trinity College ==
Bradsher attended Trinity College from 1901 to 1905 and graduated cum laude. He received his master's degree in 1905. His thesis was entitled "Growing tobacco in the State of North Carolina." He was a member of Alpha Tau Omega.

=== Tombs ===
In 1903, Bradsher was the principal founder of the Tombs, one of the strongest organizations on the Trinity/Duke campus from 1903 to 1942. Its purpose was to promote Varsity and intramural athletics and to improve team sportsmanship and school spirit. Another objective was to firmly cement relations between Trinity and other schools in the field of sports. The Tombs morphed into the Varsity Club in 1945. It combined the strengths from both organizations. Bradsher returned to the campus often to council the Tombs organization.

=== Baseball ===
Bradsher lettered five times at Trinity.

==== 1902 ====
The Trinity College "strikeout king" first gained recognition after he pitched three shutouts in eight days in April 1902, striking out forty-three batters and allowing a total of three hits. The first was a nineteen-strikeout no-hitter against Wake Forest. He one-hit Guilford two days later, and carried a no-hitter into the ninth inning three days later again against Wake Forest.

==== 1903 ====
His pitching record for his sophomore season was 7–2–1. In the 4–4 tie against Mercer he was called on for the only relief appearance of his career. He pitched six perfect no-hit innings striking out twelve Mercer batters. The game was called for darkness after twelve innings. Bradsher also led the Trinity team with a .354 batting average in 1903.

==== 1904 ====
After beginning the 1904 season pitching two no-hitters and on his way to a third, Bradsher took himself out with a cut finger in the eighth inning against Guilford. He threw with pinpoint control and led Trinity to the 1904 Southern Intercollegiate Athletic Association (SIAA) championship.. Bradsher won 13 games and lost only one while recording a 0.73 ERA. His WHIP average was 0.395. The four walks in 129 innings and in fourteen complete games is a record that still stands.

==== 1905 ====
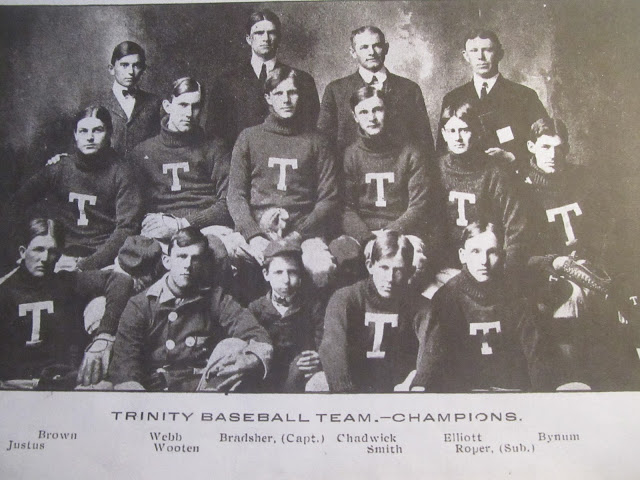
1905 Team

In 1905, Bradsher missed a perfect game against Mercer due to a miscue by his shortstop in the second inning of his no-hit, no walk, ten inning performance. His twenty-two strikeouts in the game was a record that stood until 1965. The game of the year was the loss to Georgia Tech and pitcher Craig Day (dubbed "the greatest game played in Dixie" until the 1908 Nashville-New Orleans game).

==== Records ====
Bradsher struck out 15 batters on 10 occasions. Seven times he went to the mound and pitched no-hit ball. Five of those appearances were complete games. (Note: The pitcher who holds the record for the most no-hitters is Nolan Ryan, who threw seven in his long major league career.)

Bradsher holds 11 single season Duke pitching records: Most strikeouts in a single season (171), most wins in a single season (13), most innings pitched in a season (134), most games started (14), most complete games in a season (14), least hits given up per 9 innings (2.34), least walks per 9 innings (0.29), strikeout to walk ratio (42.75), whip (0.395), shutouts (5), and lowest ERA (0.0746). He holds nine career pitching records: Career games started (58), career wins (42), complete games (56), innings pitched (513), fewest hits per 9 innings (4.28), most career strikeouts (586), most career shutouts (15), most years lettered in a single sport (5) and most years serving as a team captain (3). Bradsher has been added to the 2020 ballot for the Duke University Athletics Hall of Fame.

== Personal ==
On August 29, 1907, Bradsher married Elizabeth Chadwick Muse. Four of their five children attended Duke University, His oldest son Charles was a chemistry professor at Duke for forty-five years. Twenty family members and descendants attended Duke University. A novel based on Bradsher, "King of the Southern Diamond" is scheduled to be published in mid-summer 2019.

== Tobacco career ==
After graduation from Trinity College, it was reported by Ted Mann, the publicist for Duke University, that Bradsher turned down an offer to play professional baseball in the amount of $10,000. That would have been the highest price ever offered a player coming out of college. Instead he accepted a job in the tobacco industry, with American Tobacco Company.

In 1945, Bradsher retired from his position as vice president, at Imperial Tobacco in Montreal, Canada, to his 100-acre farm, Summerlea on the Neuse River near New Bern, North Carolina.

== Books ==
- Spence, Hersey Everett (1954). "I Remember": Recollections and Reminiscences of Alma Mater. Seeman Printery.
- Duke University (2018). Duke University Baseball Media Guide (PDF).
