= Craig Day =

American baseball and football player (1884–1963)

- Pitcher
- Born: March 17, 1884; Jasper, Georgia, U.S.
- Died: February 28, 1963; Knoxville, Tennessee, U.S.

debut
- 1903, Georgia Tech

Last appearance
- 1906, Georgia Tech

Career statistics
- Strikeouts: 203
- Shutouts: 6

Craig Clarence Day (March 17, 1884 – February 28, 1963) was an American college baseball and college football player for the Georgia Tech Yellow Jackets at the Georgia Institute of Technology. Later he was a Knoxville businessman.

A pitcher on the baseball team from 1903 to 1906, his 12 complete games in 1905 and 6 career shutouts is still a record. He posted a record of 24–8. He beat Arthur Bradsher of Trinity in 1905 in what was dubbed the "greatest game in Dixie" before the 1908 Nashville v. New Orleans game. He and Ed Lafitte were teammates at Tech. Day was also an outfielder, selected All-Southern at the position in 1904.

Day was an end on coach John Heisman's football team. He was inducted into the Georgia Tech Hall of Fame in 1962.
