= 1906 college baseball season =

Seasons
- ← 1905 1907 →

The 1906 college baseball season, play of college baseball in the United States began in the spring of 1906. Play largely consisted of regional matchups, some organized by conferences, and ended in June. No national championship event was held until 1947.

The very initial varsity baseball team was formed at St. John's University. The team mostly faced up against regional and local opponents in the vicinity of New York City. Although there are few complete records of their first season, the universities of Fordham University, the College of Columbia, and New York University—all of which had baseball teams at the time—were probably among their usual opponents.

== New programs ==
- St. John's played its first varsity season.

== Conference winners ==
This is a partial list of conference champions from the 1906 season.

Conference	Regular season winner
Big Nine	Illinois
SIAA	Georgia Tech
