= Ed Lafitte =

American baseball player (1886–1971)

- Pitcher
- Born: April 7, 1886; New Orleans, Louisiana, U.S.
- Died: April 12, 1971 (aged 85); Jenkintown, Pennsylvania, U.S.
- Batted: Right Threw: Right

MLB debut
- April 16, 1909, for the Detroit Tigers

Last MLB appearance
- August 26, 1915, for the Buffalo Blues

MLB statistics
- Win–loss record: 37–35
- Earned run average: 3.34
- Strikeouts: 262
- Stats at Baseball Reference

Teams
- Detroit Tigers (1909–1912); Brooklyn Tip-Tops (1914–1915); Buffalo Blues (1915)

Edward Francis Lafitte (April 7, 1886 – April 12, 1971) was an American pitcher in Major League Baseball who played with the Detroit Tigers (1909–12), Brooklyn Tip-Tops (1914–15), and Buffalo Blues (1915). Born in New Orleans, Louisiana, at his family's home located at 319 Bourbon Street, he batted and threw right-handed.

== Baseball career ==
Lafitte pitched for the Georgia Institute of Technology baseball team in 1906 and 1907. He also was a starter in the first intercollegiate basketball game ever played by Georgia Tech. He made his debut with the Detroit Tigers in 1909. After an 11-8 season with the 1911 Tigers, Lafitte told manager Hughie Jennings that he wanted to leave early the following season to resume dental school. Jennings told him if he left early to keep on going. Lafitte did. He became a dentist, but also pitched in the Federal League.

Lafitte returned to baseball in 1914 as a member of the Brooklyn Tip-Tops of the fledgling Federal League. That season he became the first pitcher to throw a no-hitter without throwing a shutout in a 6–2 victory over the Kansas City Packers on September 19. In 1914, he split his final season between the Tip-Tops and the Buffalo Blues.

== Personal life ==
Lafitte graduated from Southern Dental College in 1911. He served in the U.S. Army during both World Wars. He practiced dentistry for 42 years in Philadelphia, Pennsylvania, retiring in 1961. The Jenkintown, Pennsylvania, resident died at age 85 at his home and is buried at Ivy Hill Cemetery in Philadelphia.

Despite assertions by some authors to the contrary, Ed Lafitte was not a descendant of the famed New Orleans pirate, Jean Lafitte. Ed Lafitte was the son of James Arnauld Lafitte (born March 31, 1846, in Charleston, South Carolina; died March 16, 1907, in Atlanta, Georgia), who was the son of John Baptiste Lafitte (born June 24, 1822, in Augusta, Georgia; died May 21, 1887, in New Orleans, Louisiana), who was the son of James Bertrand Lafitte (born October 16, 1770, in Tartas, France; died November 13, 1838, in Charleston, South Carolina). Since the pirate Jean Lafitte's lifespan was c. 1776–1823, it is not possible that Ed Lafitte was his descendant. It is unknown if they were more distantly related.

== See also ==
- List of Major League Baseball no-hitters
- 1911 Detroit Tigers season

== Notes ==
Preceded by George Davis	No-hitter pitcher September 19, 1914	Succeeded by Rube Marquard
