= 1905 college baseball season =

Seasons
- ← 1904 1906 →

The 1905 college baseball season, play of college baseball in the United States began in the spring of 1905. Play largely consisted of regional matchups, some organized by conferences, and ended in June. No national championship event was held until 1947.

== Conference winners ==
This is a partial list of conference champions from the 1905 season.

Conference	Regular season winner
Big Nine	Michigan
SIAA	Auburn

== Conference standings ==
The following is an incomplete list of conference standings:

1905 Western Conference baseball standings
	Conf.				Overall
Team	W		L	PCT	W		L	PCT
Michigan ‍†‍‍	9	–	3	.750		–		–
Illinois ‍‍‍	7	–	5	.583		–		–
Chicago ‍‍‍	4	–	8	.333		–		–
Wisconsin ‍‍‍	4	–	8	.333		–		–
† – Conference champion
