= 1907 IAAUS baseball season =

United States baseball season

Seasons
- ← 1906 1908 →

The 1907 IAAUS baseball season, play of college baseball in the United States organized by the Intercollegiate Athletic Association of the United States (IAAUS), a forerunner of the National Collegiate Athletic Association (NCAA), began in the spring of 1907. Play largely consisted of regional matchups, some organized by conferences, and ended in June. No national championship event was held until 1947.

== New programs and ballpark changes ==
- Oregon State launched their program at their on-campus field, later to be known as Goss Stadium at Coleman Field. The ballpark is now the oldest continuously used field in the country.
- New Mexico State played their first varsity season.

== Conference winners ==
This is a partial list of conference champions from the 1907 season.

Conference	Regular season winner
Big Nine	Illinois
