= Baseball at the 1956 Summer Olympics =

Demonstration sport

Tournament details
- Country: Australia
- City: Melbourne
- Venue: Melbourne Cricket Ground
- Dates: December 1, 1956
- Teams: 2

Final positions
- Champions: United States
- Runners-up: Australia

Tournament statistics
- Games played: 1

Baseball at the 1956 Summer Olympics was a demonstration sport at the 1956 Summer Olympics in Melbourne. It would become an official sport 36 years later at the 1992 Summer Olympics. Though it was nominally the "foreign" demonstration sport of that Olympiad, Australia had a long history of baseball dating back to at least 1889. The Australians fielded the senior national team in an exhibition match against the United States, represented by a detachment from the United States Far East Command. Many Sheffield Shield cricket players – who were quite successful at baseball as a winter sport – were unable to be selected on the basis that they were professional players.

Held at the Melbourne Cricket Ground, the game was notable for its high turnout; at the time, it was thought to be the largest audience for a baseball game in history, though the exact number of spectators remains in question.

== Game ==
The game was played on 1 December 1956 from 12:30 p.m. at the Melbourne Cricket Ground. Due to the field being set up between the running tracks, right field was only 225 feet (69 m), so special ground rules were put in place, stating that a ball hit over the running track on the full will be declared a home run, where one that bounces (or rolls) on or over the track shall be declared a ground rule double. This rule was put in place to stop baseball cleats damaging the track for the events after the baseball.

As the visiting team, the Americans batted first, scoring two runs off three hits. Australia did not strike back until the bottom of the second inning, when Chalky White of South Australia hit a solo home run off Vane Sutton. Sutton made up for his error in the top half on the third inning, with a grand slam to send the score out to a commanding 6–1. The Americans again put the pressure on Australia in the fifth inning as two errors led to another two runs to the US, putting them in a comfortable position. The game was eventually called at 2:40 p.m., after six completed innings and a final score of 11–5, with the Americans batting first.

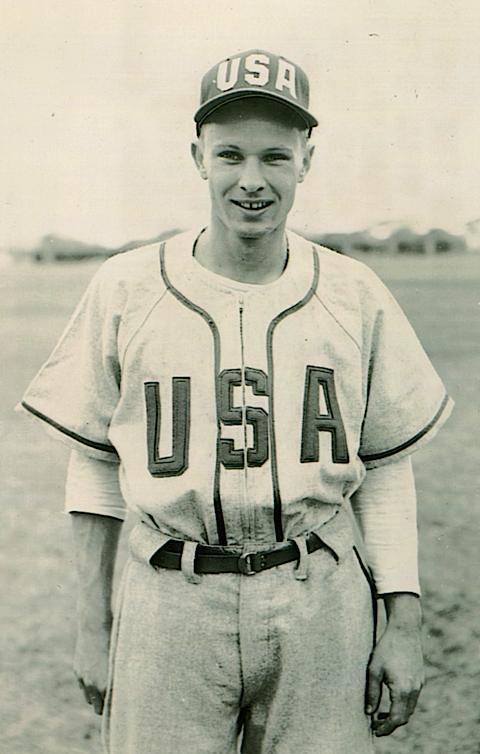
Dick Griesser, a future Collegiate All-American, was on the U.S. team

Very few fans were present at the start of the game, but thousands more had arrived by the sixth inning. This was due to the finals for the 1500 metres, 4 × 400 metres relay, and finish of the men's marathon. The stadium announcer claimed that it was the largest audience for a baseball game anywhere in the world up to that point. (Note: The largest Major League Baseball stadium in 1956, Cleveland's cavernous Lakefront Stadium, had a regular capacity of only 78,000. Lakefront had previously drawn a record 86,563 during a September 12, 1954 doubleheader against the New York Yankees. The single-game record at the time, 86,288 spectators, was also at Cleveland Lakefront, during Game 5 of the 1948 World Series.) However, the actual number of spectators is unclear, largely because the baseball game was just one event at the Cricket Ground that day, and ticket sales were not counted separately for each event. (Note: Cava (1992) estimated that attendance for the game was 114,000. Contemporary accounts in The Sydney Morning Herald are more conservative, placing the number at around 80,000.) The most reliable number, according to National Baseball Hall of Fame, is 86,425, which was the official number of gate receipts collected that day.

After the Olympics, the U.S. team would go on to play several exhibition games against local amateur teams in Australia, playing the Claxton Shield squads of South Australia, Queensland, Victoria, and New South Wales.

== Game score ==
December 1, 12:30 at Melbourne Cricket Ground
Team	1	2	3	4	5	6	R
United States	2	0	4	0	2	3	11
Australia	0	1	0	0	1	3	5
Home runs: USA: Vane Sutton; AUS: Norman White; Attendance: 86,425 (officially); Umpires: Gunnah Mollah

== Venue ==
Melbourne, Australia	Baseball at the 1956 Summer Olympics is located in Melbourne
Melbourne Cricket Ground	Baseball at the 1956 Summer Olympics is located in Melbourne
Capacity: 120,000	Baseball at the 1956 Summer Olympics is located in Melbourne

== Rosters ==
=== United States ===
Manager: Col. Leonard Weissinger, USAF
Coach: SSgt. Walter Koziatek, USAF

- 2nd Lt Ken Cochran (C)
  - PFC Ken Lowe (C)
- 1st Lt W. Bruce Holt, (1B)
  - Lt Floyd Lasser (1B)
- PFC Alvin Pfeffer (2B)
- Pvt George Zucca (SS)
- 2nd Lt John Riley (3B)
- 2nd Lt Ben Dolson (UTIL)
- SNA Tom Black, (LF)
- A2C Jesse Finch (CF)
- PFC Richard Griesser (RF)
- TSgt Vane Sutton (SP)
- CPL Joe Belak (RP)
- 1st Lt John Clement (RP)
- 1st Lt Anthony Denicole (P - DNP)
- SN Joseph Poglajen (P - DNP)
- A2C Garethe Methvin (P - DNP)
- PFC Rudy Martinez (P - DNP)

=== Australia ===
Manager: Reg Darling

- Robert Teasdale (C)
  - Barry Wappett (C)
- Colin Payne (1B)
- Ken Smith (2B)
- Max Puckett (3B)
- Neil Turl (SS)
- Norman Tyshing (LF)
- Ken Morrison (CF)
- Norman White (RF)
- Eddie Moule (SP)
- Peter Box (RP)
- Max Lord (RP)
- Ross Straw (P)
- Peter McDade
- John Langley
- Neville Pratt
- Trevor Cooke

The Australian team included two future members of the Baseball Australia Hall of Fame, Ross Straw (inducted 2005) and Norman White (inducted 2011). American outfielder Dick Greisser was a future Collegiate All-American, and would go on to be inducted into the University of Arizona Athletics Hall of Fame in 2003.

== See also ==
- 1956 Claxton Shield
- Australian football at the 1956 Summer Olympics

== Sources ==
- Official Report. XVI Olympiad Melbourne 1956.

== Bibliography ==
- Ruddell, Trevor (Spring 2016). "Ballpark Figures: The MCG's World Record Baseball Crowd Myth" (PDF). The Yorker (60). Melbourne Cricket Club: 20–24.
