= 1958 College Baseball All-America Team =

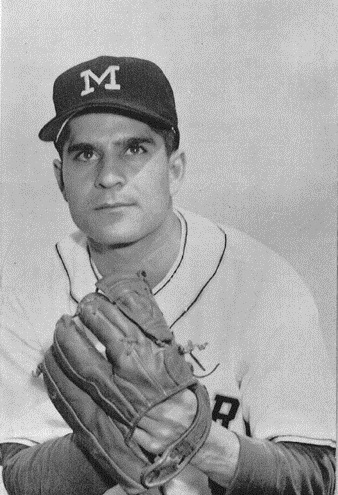
1958 All-Americans included Missouri's Ray Uriarte.

This is a list of college baseball players named first team All-Americans for the 1958 NCAA University Division baseball season. From 1947 to 1963, the American Baseball Coaches Association was the only generally recognized All-America selector, so any player selected by the ABCA is considered a "consensus" All-American.

== Key ==
A	American Baseball Coaches Association
	Member of the National College Baseball Hall of Fame
	Consensus All-American – selected the ABCA

== All-Americans ==
Position	Name	School	#	A
Pitcher	Jack Rumohr	Western Michigan	1	✓
Pitcher	Bob Wedin	UConn	1	✓
Catcher	Ralph Holding	Stanford	1	✓
First baseman	Frank Sais	Harvard	1	✓
Second baseman	Bernie Parrish	Florida	1	✓
Shortstop	Dick Howser	Florida State	1	✓
Third baseman	Ray Uriarte	Missouri	1	✓
Outfielder	Dick Griesser	Arizona	1	✓
Outfielder	Ron Nieman	Wisconsin	1	✓
Outfielder	Jerry Siegert	USC	1	✓

== See also ==
- List of college baseball awards
