= Far North Coast Baseball Association =

- Sport: Baseball
- Founded: 13 May 1937; 89 years ago
- Founder: Laurie Thew
- Commissioner: Craig Scheibel
- No. of teams: Six
- Country: Australia
- Venues: Albert Park, Lismore
- Most recent champion: Workers
- Website: fnc.baseball.com.au

The Far North Coast Baseball Association (FNCBA) is the organising body for baseball on the Far North Coast of New South Wales, Australia.

== History ==
In 1937, Laurie Thew, an aspiring right-handed pitcher from Sydney moved to Lismore and began efforts to establish baseball in the city. On 11 May 1937 a public notice was published in The Northern Star inviting interest in the formation of a 'Baseball Club', with the initial meeting taking place on Thursday 13 May 1937. Soon there were enough players for two teams and within weeks challenges were issued and representative games against Queensland based teams were being held. The first representative baseball game ever held in Lismore took place on Saturday 31 July 1937, Queensland vs Lismore, with the visitors winning 7-1 on the back of some brilliant pitching. The advent of World War II led to a hiatus and it was not until 1947 when Thew again proved the catalyst - calling a meeting to re-establish the league. Thew is now recognised as the “Father of Baseball” on the Far North Coast.

Initially the FNCBA played on cricket grounds during the winter and as the league grew this caused pressure on the city to find a dedicated space for the sport. Since 1965 FNCBA has used dedicated fields at the Albert Park sporting complex in Lismore, with the main diamond now known as Baxter Field.

From 1952, the FNCBA was affiliated with Baseball Queensland, but in August 2018 they moved to the NSW Country Baseball Association, under the banner of Baseball NSW.

In 2015, for the first time in the 78-year history of the FNCBA, an all-women's team competed - the Ballina Sharkettes.

Currently there are teams from clubs based in Ballina, Casino and several clubs (Easts, Marist Brothers, Norths and Workers) from Lismore. In the past there have also been clubs from Alstonville and Kyogle.

The Association has produced numerous Australian (men's and women's) representatives including Barry Wappett, Barry Pratt, Harold Crozier, Geoff Mould, Ray, Mark and Mat Buckley, Matt Gahan, Peter Gahan, Matt Gates, Adrian Meagher, Michael Nind, Karina Connors and James Linger.

Barry Wappett (1956, Melbourne), Michael Nind (1988, Seoul), Mat Buckley (2000, Sydney) and Adrian Meagher (2000, Sydney) represented Australia at the Olympics.

The area remains one of the strongest centres for Baseball in Australia.

== Clubs ==
Team	First played	Grade(s)
Alstonville	1990	
Ballina Sharks	1975	Div 3
Casino		Div 3
Easts Redbirds	1948	Major League, Div 1, Div 2, Seniors, Juniors, Little League
Marist Brothers	1948	Major League, Div 1, Juniors, Little League
Norths Bears	1948	Major League, Div 1, Div 2, Div 3, Under 20s, Seniors, Juniors, Little League
Workers	1963	Major League, Div 1, Div 2, Div 3, Seniors, Juniors, Little League

== Major League Champions ==
- 2023: Workers
- 2022:
- 2021: Marists (awarded minor premiers only, as finals called off due to COVID-19).
- 2020: Workers
- 2019: Norths
- 2018: Easts
- 2017: Workers
- 2016: Easts
- 2015: Easts
- 2014: Norths
- 2013: Marists
- 2012: Easts
- 2011: Easts
- 2010: Easts
- 2009: Norths
- 2008: Norths
- 2007: Workers
- 2006: Easts
- 2005: Easts
- 2004: Workers
- 2003: Marists
- 2002: Marists
- 2001: Workers
- 2000: Marists
- 1999: Workers
- 1998: Marists
- 1997: Marists
- 1996: Workers
- 1995: Marists
- 1994: Marists
- 1993: Norths
- 1992: Norths
- 1991: Marists
- 1990:
- 1989 Workers
- 1988: Marists
- 1987: Workers
- 1986: Marists
- 1985: Workers
- 1984: Marists
- 1983: Workers
- 1982: Marists
- 1981: Easts
- 1980: Marists
- 1979: Marists
- 1978: Marists
- 1977: Marists
- 1976: Marists
- 1975: Marists
- 1974: Marists
- 1973:
- 1972:
- 1971/72:
- 1971: Marists
- 1970/71: Marists
- 1970: Marists
- 1969:
- 1968:
- 1967:
- 1966: Workers
- 1965: Workers
- 1964: Marists
- 1963:
- 1962: Marists
- 1961:
- 1960:
- 1959:
- 1958: Marists
- 1957: Marists
- 1956: Marists
- 1955: Marists
- 1954: Marists
- 1953: Marists
- 1952: A G Robertsons (AGRs)
- 1951: AGRs
- 1950: Souths
- 1949: Souths
- 1948: Cubs [Later became "Easts"]
- 1947:
- 1946: No competition.
- 1945: No competition.
- 1944: No competition.
- 1943: No competition.
- 1942: No competition.
- 1941:
- 1940: Saxons
- 1939: Cubs
- 1938: Giants
- 1937:

== Huckleberry Medal (Major League MVP) ==
Beginning 1960, at the end of every season, the "Huckleberry Medal" has been awarded to the player deemed MVP in the FNCBA "Major League" competition. Past winners have been:

In addition to the list below, Peter Gahan (Marist Brothers) won the medal five times in the 1970s-1980s.

- 2020: Kodey Wilford (Brothers)
- 2019: Robbie Pruess (East Redbirds)
- 2018: Robbie Pruess (East Redbirds)
- 2017: Will Riley (Redbirds)
- 2016: Robbie Pruess (East Redbirds)
- 2015: Michael Munro (Easts Redbirds)
- 2014: James Linger (Norths)
- 2013:
- 2012: Troy Pruess (Workers)
- 2011: Mick McClelland (Workers)
- 2010: Robbie Pruess (Redbirds)
- 2009: Paul Simes (Norths)
- 2008: Dallas Knapp (Workers)
- 2007: James Linger (Norths)
- 2006: Troy Pruess (Workers)
- 2005: Troy Pruess (Workers)
- 2004: Dallas Knapp (Workers)
- 2003: Matt Gahan (Marist Brothers)
- 2002: Paul Simes (Norths)
- 2001: Dallas Knapp (Workers)
- 2000: Chris Neven (Marist Brothers)
- 1999: Wayne Devlin (Workers)
- 1998: Matt Gahan (Marist Brothers)
- 1997: David Youngberry (Marist Brothers)
- 1996: David Youngberry (Marist Brothers)
- 1995: David Youngberry (Marist Brothers)
- 1994: Mark Buckley (Marist Brothers)
- 1993: Mark Buckley (Marist Brothers)
- 1992: Peter Buttrum (Norths)
- 1991: Alan Worgan (Workers)
- 1990:
- 1989:
- 1988:
- 1987:
- 1986:
- 1985:
- 1984: Alan Worgan (Workers)
- 1983: Stephen Devlin (Workers)
- 1982: Adrian Meagher (Workers)
- 1981:
- 1980:
- 1979:
- 1978:
- 1977: Adrian Meagher (Workers)
- 1976: Bob McClelland (Workers)
- 1975: Michael Gahan Jnr (Marist Brothers)
- 1974:
- 1973:
- 1972:
- 1971: Michael Gahan Jnr (Marist Brothers)
- 1970:
- 1969: Maurice Gahan (Marist Brothers)
- 1968:
- 1967:
- 1966:
- 1965:
- 1964:
- 1963:
- 1962:
- 1961:
- 1960: Reg Baxter (Norths)

== See also ==
- Australian Baseball Federation
- New South Wales Major League
- New South Wales Patriots

== Sources ==
- Clark, Joe (2003). A History of Australian Baseball : Time and Game. University of Nebraska Press. ISBN 978-0803264403.
