= 1958 Colorado State College Bears baseball team =

Baseball team

1958 Colorado State College Bears baseball

Rocky Mountain Conference champions

College World Series, T-5th
- Conference: Rocky Mountain Conference
- Record: 20–10 (– RMC)
- Head coach: Pete Butler (16th season)
- Assistant coach: Tom Cooper (1st season)
- Home stadium: Jackson Field

The 1958 Colorado State College Bears baseball team represented Colorado State College in the 1958 NCAA University Division baseball season. The Bears played their home games at Jackson Field. The team was coached by Pete Butler in his 16th year at Colorado State.

The Bears lost the District VII playoff, but when BYU opted not to play in the College World Series due to their school's rule to rest on Sundays, the Bears to advanced to the College World Series, where they were defeated by the Southern California Trojans.

== Roster ==
1958 Colorado State College Bears baseball team
Players
Coaches

#	Pos.	Name	B/T	Height	Weight	Year	Home town
	OF	Floyd Acre	/	—	—
		George Bethel	/	—	—
		Fred Boom	/	—	—
		John Bradley	/	—	—
	OF	Paul Chamberlain	/	—	—
		Delbert Davies	/	—	—
		Joe Duca	/	—	—
	INF	Don Gentry	/	—	—
	RHP	Ron Herbel	R/R	6 ft 1 in (1.85 m)	195 lb (88 kg)		Denver, Colorado
		Tom Jenkins	/	—	—
		Ken Kempf	/	—	—
	C	Larry Klumb	/	—	—
		Ken Krause	/	—	—
		Wayne Merritt	/	—	—
		Bill Oster	/	—	—
	INF	Joe Peck	/	—	—
	INF	Carl Rohnke	/	—	—
		Virg Speak	/	—	—
		Bill Trimble	/	—	—
		Larry Turner	/	—	—
		Danny Walkup	/	—	—

Head coach

Pete Butler

Assistant coach(es)

Tom Cooper

Legend

- (C) Team captain
- (S) Suspended
- (I) Ineligible
- Injured
- Current redshirt

== Schedule ==
1958 Colorado State College Bears baseball game log
Regular season
March (2–2)

#	Date	Opponent	Site/stadium	Score	Overall record	RMC record
1	March 18	at Arizona	UA Field • Tucson, Arizona	3–17	0–1	–
2	March 19	at Arizona	UA Field • Tucson, Arizona	1–15	0–2	–
3	March 21	at New Mexico A&M	Unknown • Las Cruces, New Mexico	17–9	1–2	–
4	March 22	at New Mexico A&M	Unknown • Las Cruces, New Mexico	11–3	2–2	–

April (0–0)

#	Date	Opponent	Site/stadium	Score	Overall record	RMC record

May (0–0)

#	Date	Opponent	Site/stadium	Score	Overall record	RMC record
23	May 21	Air Force	Jackson Field • Greeley, Colorado	9–8	17–6	–
24	May 24	at Air Force	Falcon Baseball Field • Colorado Springs, Colorado	6–3	18–6	–

Postseason
District VII Playoff (1–2)

#	Date	Opponent	Site/stadium	Score	Overall record	RMC record
25	May 30	at BYU	Cougar Field • Provo, Utah	3–4	18–7	–
26	May 31	at BYU	Cougar Field • Provo, Utah	8–0	19–7	–
27	May 31	at BYU	Cougar Field • Provo, Utah	5–9	19–8	–

College World Series (1–2)

#	Date	Opponent	Site/stadium	Score	Overall record	RMC record
28	June 14	vs Lafayette	Omaha Municipal Stadium • Omaha, Nebraska	10–5	20–8	–
29	June 15	vs Missouri	Omaha Municipal Stadium • Omaha, Nebraska	2–11	20–9	–
30	June 16	vs Southern California	Omaha Municipal Stadium • Omaha, Nebraska	1–12	20–10	–

== Awards and honors ==
Larry Klumb

- All-Rocky Mountain Conference Team
- Third Team All-American American Baseball Coaches Association

Carl Rohnke

- All-Rocky Mountain Conference Team
