= Gunnah Mollah =

Australian baseball player, coach, and umpire

Gunnah Mollah was an Australian baseball player, coach and umpire. He is considered as one of the founding fathers of Queensland Baseball.

== Biography ==
Mollah played with the Eastern Suburbs club in the QBA Fixtures as a catcher in 1927 before moving to Valley in 1930. Gunnah went on to represent Queensland in 1933 and in the first Queensland Rams touring team, which toured Newcastle and Maitland in 1934. He went on to be a member of the first Queensland team to participate in the Claxton Shield in 1939.

He was selected in the All-Australian team from 1936 to 1939. His brother Albert also played alongside him at the club and state level and was selected alongside Gunnah in 1936. After World War II, Gunnah represented Queensland in friendly series against New South Wales, but did not play in the Claxton Shield again due to Queensland not participating in the tournament until the year 1950. He went on to coach Queensland in 1955 and 1956 and umpired many games including Claxton Shield, a friendly series against the Tokyo Giants and the 1956 Olympics Baseball.

In 2009, he was posthumously inducted into the Queensland Baseball Hall of Fame.
