= Max Lord =

Max Lord may refer to:

- Maxwell Lord, a supervillain appearing in comic books published by DC Comics
- Max Lord (baseball) (1925–2019), Australian baseball player
