= Intentional balk =

Tactic in baseball

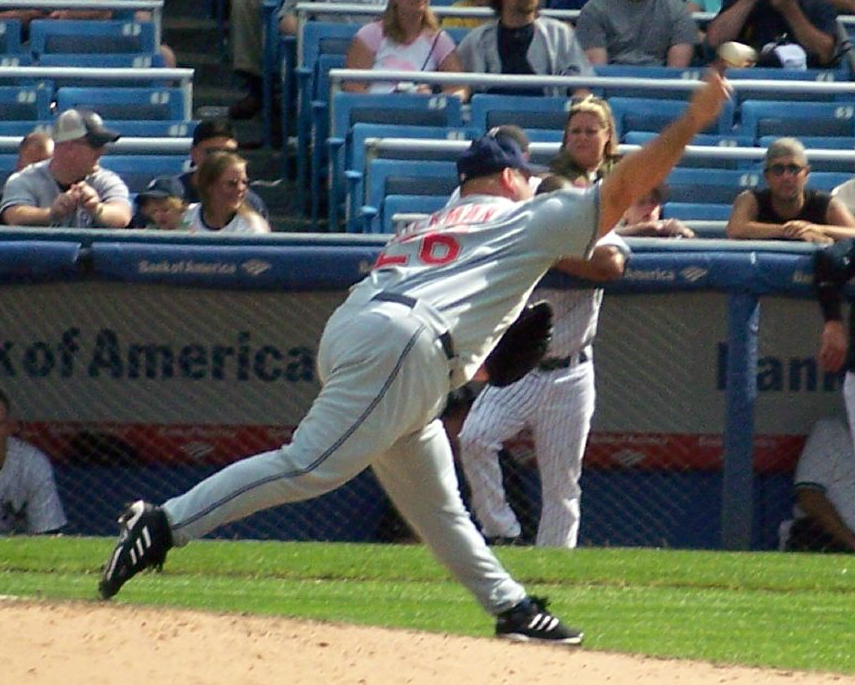
Bob Wickman, who performed an intentional balk as a member of the 2005 Cleveland Indians

The intentional balk is a tactic used in baseball. Used infrequently, it typically involves the pitcher deliberately balking in order to move a baserunner from second base to third base, in order to prevent the baserunner from sign stealing or signaling to the batter where the catcher is setting up. The tactic has also been used, in rare instances, for other purposes as outlined below.

== Early history ==
Early instances of intentional balks appear to have occurred for reasons other than concern about sign stealing.

A 1925 newspaper article related a story from umpire Bill Brennan, whereby in 1924 a pitcher with Birmingham, while pitching against Memphis (presumed to be the Birmingham Barons and Memphis Chickasaws of the Southern Association), committed a balk with runners on first and second with one out, thus advancing the runners to second and third. After then retiring the side on two short fly balls to outfielders, the pitcher remarked to the umpire that he had balked intentionally, so he could alter his pitching position to a windup, rather than pitching from the stretch.

An intentional balk was attempted in the 1956 Claxton Shield, a multi-team tournament in Australia. Victoria and South Australia were contesting the final game of the tournament, and the standings were such that the outcome of the tournament could be determined by run differential. After playing to a tie and going into extra innings, South Australia held a 5–4 lead entering the bottom of the 12th inning; however, they knew that a one-run victory would not be enough to win the title on run differential. When Victoria had a runner on third base, South Australia attempted to allow that runner to score, in hopes of forcing another inning and then winning by more than a single run. After a failed attempt at throwing the ball out of play, the South Australia pitcher deliberately balked to try and send the runner home. However, the umpires ended the game and awarded it as a 9–0 forfeit win for Victoria on the basis of South Australia bringing the game into disrepute.

A newspaper article in 1976 noted that an intentional balk occurring during an American Legion Baseball game in Pennsylvania—with a thunderstorm approaching, the batting team started to swing at every pitch in an attempt to end the inning quickly; in response, the pitcher intentionally threw to the wrong base (thus committing a balk) in order to advance a baserunner to help prolong the inning.

In 1987, a Canadian team in the New Brunswick Senior Baseball League utilized two intentional balks in an attempt to allow the batting team to score one run, for run differential reasons akin to the above noted 1956 Claxton Shield incident. After a subsequent pickoff attempt was intentionally thrown out of play, the umpires awarded a forfeit victory to the batting team.

== Major League Baseball ==
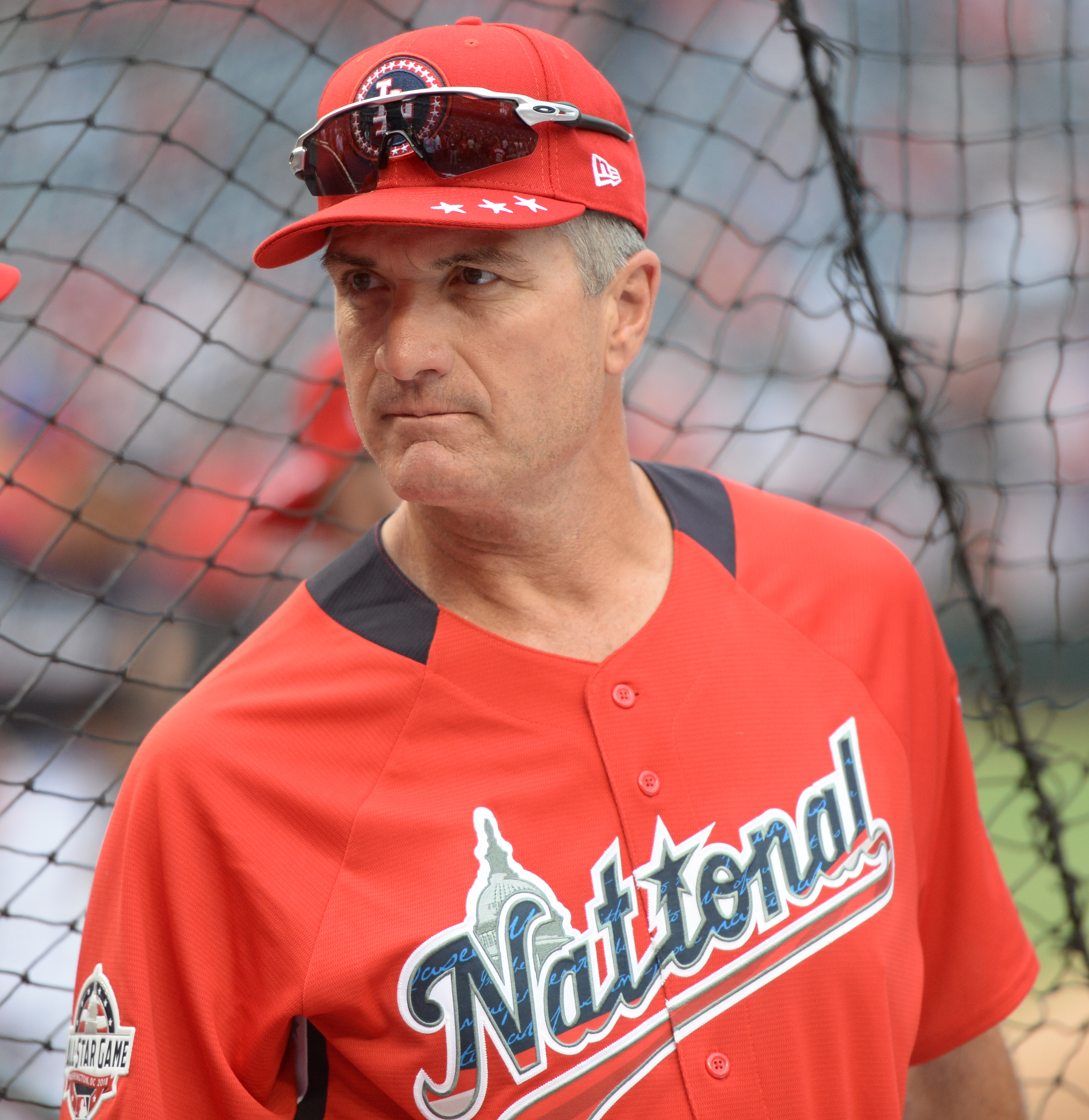
Bob Geren

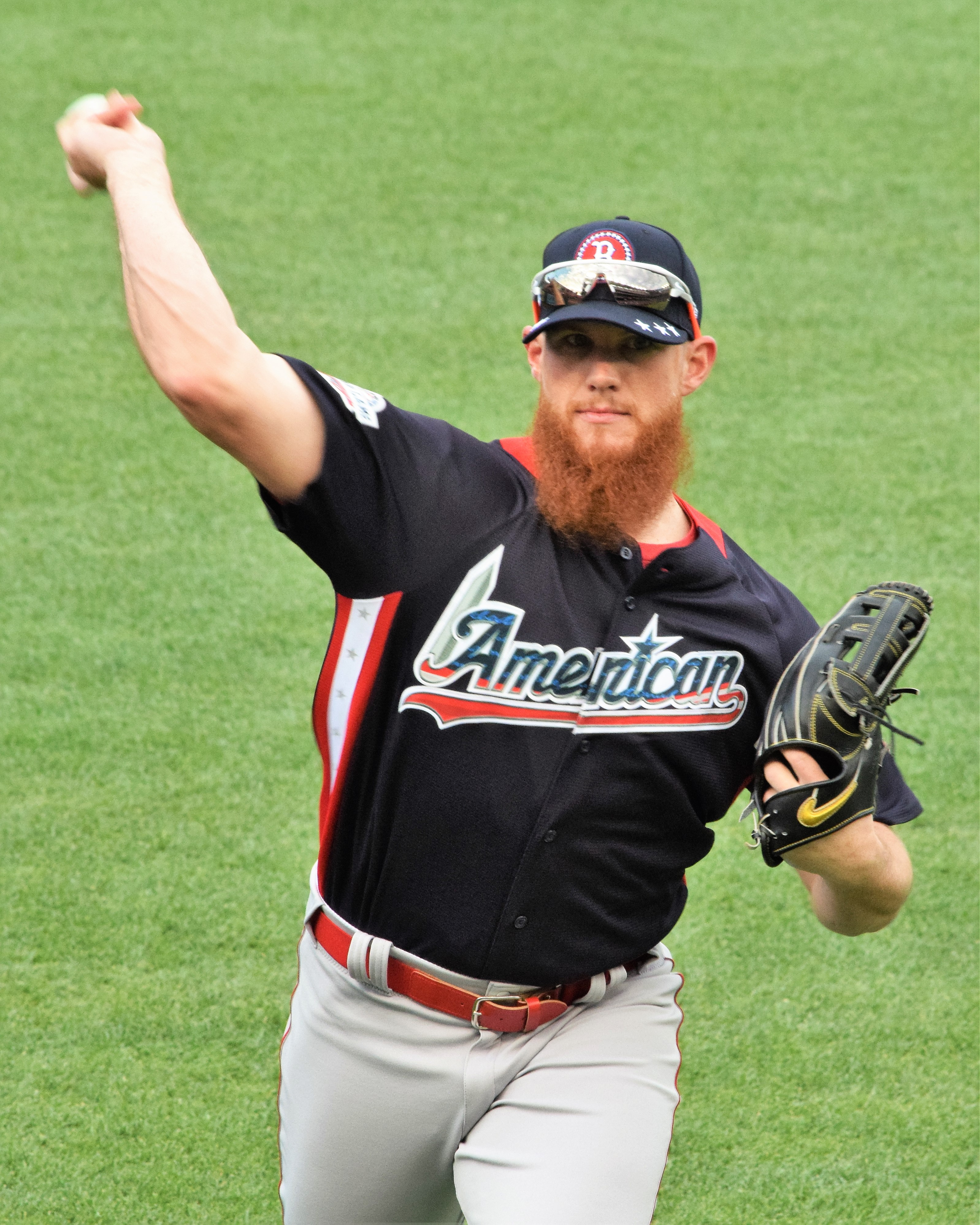
Craig Kimbrel

Intentionally committing a balk has occurred on rare occasion in Major League Baseball (MLB), primarily due to concern about sign stealing.

In one known instance, Cleveland Indians pitcher Bob Wickman performed an intentional balk on May 3, 2005. The game play-by-play account at Retrosheet notes, "Wickman balked intentionally so he would not be distracted by possibility of sign stealing from runner on 2nd". Wickman confirmed that he committed the balk intentionally, due to concern about the runner at second base, Michael Cuddyer, stealing signs.

Subsequent use, nearly 15 years later, resulted from Los Angeles Dodgers coach Bob Geren suggesting it during a spring training session as a way to prevent sign stealing. While non-electronic forms of sign stealing are legal in baseball, Geren stated it was an insurance mechanism so that a baserunner on second base would not be able to steal the signs and communicate them to the batter. After Geren raised the idea in spring training, it was executed by Dodgers pitcher Kenley Jansen against the Chicago Cubs on June 14, 2019. In the ninth inning with the Cubs having a runner on second base and the Dodgers holding a 5–3 lead, Jansen indicated he intended to balk and tapped his foot repeatedly on the rubber to force the umpires to call a balk and move the runner to third base.

An intentional balk occurred, for the same purpose, at least three times during the 2021 season: on May 26 when the Cubs' Craig Kimbrel intentionally balked against the Pittsburgh Pirates in the ninth inning (the Cubs held a three-run lead at the time), on August 25 when Corey Knebel of the Dodgers did it in the 15th inning of a game against the San Diego Padres (the Dodgers held a two-run lead), and on September 6 when Collin McHugh of the Tampa Bay Rays intentionally balked against the Boston Red Sox in the 10th inning (the Rays held a two-run lead).

Note that starting with the 2020 season, MLB has started each half-inning during extra innings with a "ghost runner" automatically placed on second base.

=== PitchCom era ===
In 2022, MLB introduced PitchCom, an optional wireless communication system used by players in place of visible signs. In the absence of visible signs, the opportunity for a runner at second base to engage in sign stealing is removed, which in turn makes use of an intentional balk to advance such a runner unnecessary. However, PitchCom has not been used by all pitchers in all games, and Kimbrel again intentionally balked on May 17, 2022, as a member of the Dodgers, against the Arizona Diamondbacks—the Dodgers held a 7–5 lead at the time, and Kimbrel's balk advanced Geraldo Perdomo to third base.

Kenley Jansen again committed an intentional balk on May 17, 2025, advancing Shohei Ohtani of the Dodgers to third base during the ninth inning while closing out the Los Angeles Angels' 11–9 victory; Jansen later stated that he didn't want Ohtani to signal to the batter (Mookie Betts) where the catcher was setting up.

Héctor Neris of the Houston Astros committed an intentional balk on August 2, 2025, while facing the Red Sox in Boston. After allowing a two-out double to Trevor Story in the bottom of the seventh inning, which gave Boston a 7–3 lead, Neris intentionally balked, moving Story to third base. Story, while at second base, had attempted to alert the batter as to what pitch was coming, possibly by looking at how Neris was gripping the baseball. After the inning concluded, Neris had words with Boston's third-base coach, causing benches to briefly empty as players came onto the field.

Louis Varland of the Toronto Blue Jays committed an intentional balk in the ninth inning of Game 4 of the 2025 World Series, by intentionally disengaging three times (one more than allowed), thus advancing Max Muncy to third base after suspecting that Muncy might have been able to see the pitcher's grip.
