= Colin Payne =

Colin Payne may refer to:

- Colin Payne (baseball), baseball player
- Colin Payne (cricketer) (born 1945), Barbadian cricketer
- Colin Payne (rugby union)
