= Baxter Field =

Baseball field in Lismore, New South Wales

Baxter International Baseball Field
- Baxter Field
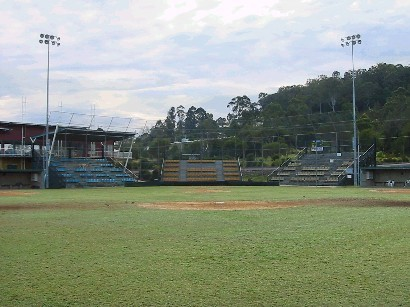
- Interactive map of Baxter International Baseball Field
- Location: Gundurimba Road, Lismore, New South Wales
- Coordinates: 28.82159°S 153.271524°E
- Owner: New South Wales Government
- Capacity: 1,500
- Surface: Grass
- Field size: Left Field – 325 feet (99 m); Center Field – 380 feet (116 m); Right Field – 325 feet (99 m)

Construction
- Opened: 1960
- Renovated: 2002, 2020

Tenants
- Lismore Timberjacks (Claxton Shield)

Baxter International Baseball Field or the Albert Park Baseball Complex is home to the Far North Coast Baseball Association (FNCBA), part of Baseball NSW, in Lismore, New South Wales. It is a fully fenced and regulation size field with field level fenced dugouts, bullpens, 4 batting cages as well as covered stands. Floodlighting is of international standard and has numerous Claxton Shield games since 1968.

The field is part of the larger Albert Park complex, with several diamonds, and opposite to Baxter Field is Thew Field which serves as a playing field for juniors as well as a warm up and training field. It is also a regulation sized, floodlight field.

== History ==
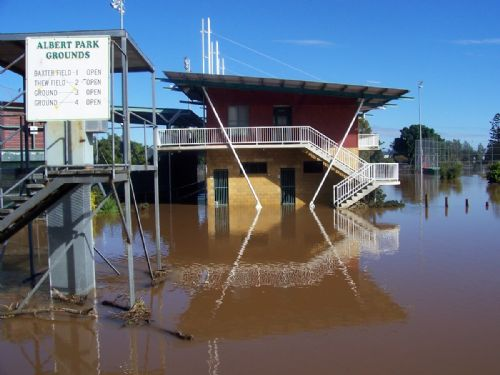
The clubhouse underwater in 2005

Baxter Field is named in honour of Reg Baxter, OAM (1924–2014), Norths (Baseball Club) and FNCBA stalwart, and a former Lismore City Council Councillor who was tireless in his support for local sport (baseball, cricket and softball) and instrumental in upgrading the facilities at Albert Park.

In 2020, a $6.95 million upgrade was completed to redevelop the complex to become the Little League centre of Australia.

In 2021, the Sydney Blue Sox announced they would be playing at least one home series against the Canberra Cavalry at the facility in lieu of being able to play at Blue Sox Stadium due to Blacktown falling in a COVID-19 pandemic hotspot. It is the first Australian Baseball League games at the complex since 2012 when the Blue Sox were hosted by the geographically closer Brisbane Bandits.

The facility will also host the Australian Baseball League All-Star Game in 2021–22.

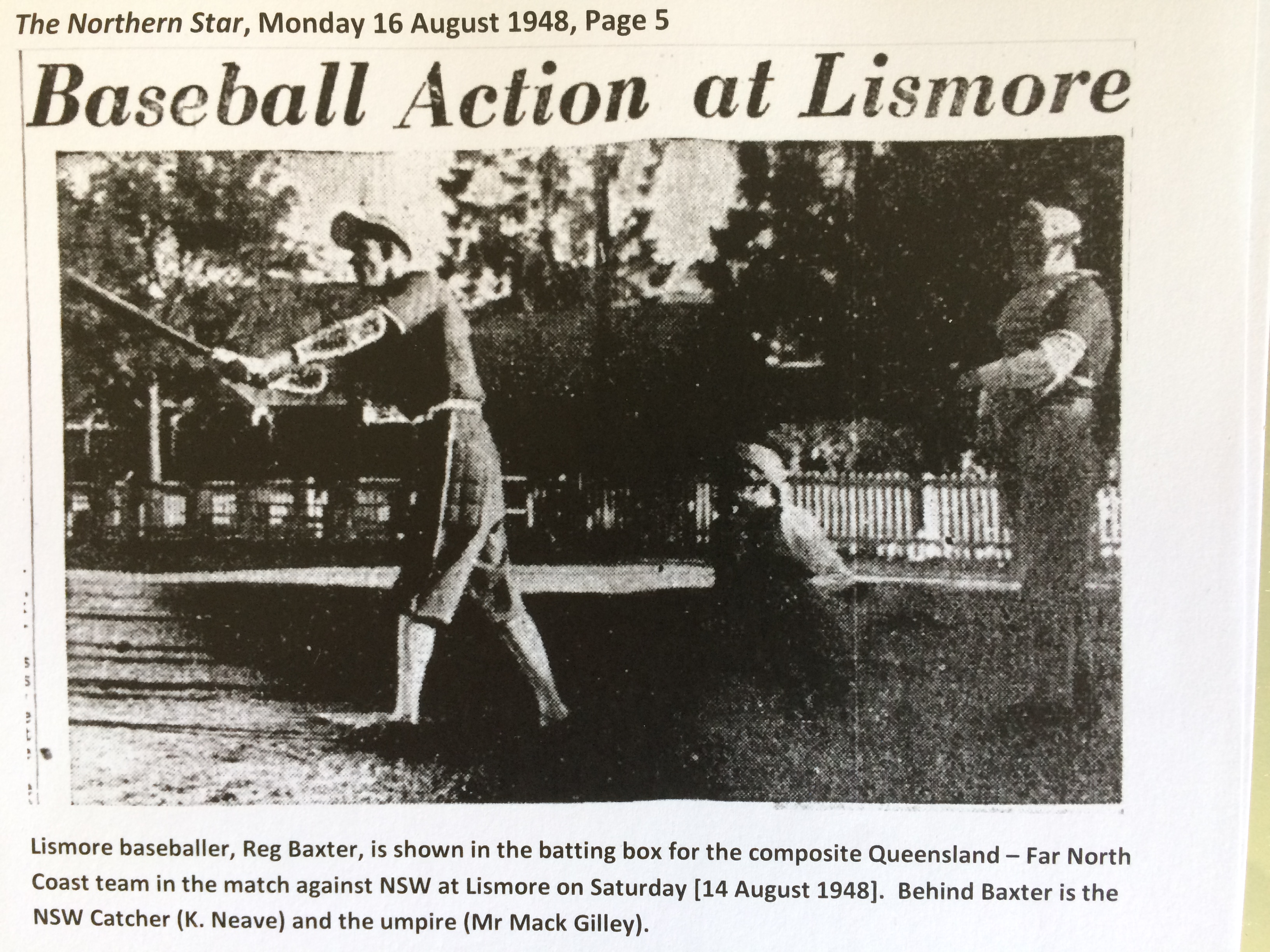
Reg Baxter, namesake of "Baxter Field", playing baseball in Lismore in 1948
