= Oscar Macías (baseball) =

Cuban baseball player

Medal record

Men's baseball

Representing Cuba

Summer Olympics
Silver medal – second place	2000 Sydney	Team

Baseball World Cup
Gold medal – first place	1998 Rome	Team
Gold medal – first place	2001 Taipei	Team

Intercontinental Cup
Silver medal – second place	1999 Sydney	Team
Gold medal – first place	2002 Havana	Team

Central American and Caribbean Games
Gold medal – first place	1998 Maracaibo	Team

World Junior Baseball Championship
Gold medal – first place	1986 Windsor	Team

Oscar Macias Hernández (born February 2, 1969) is a Cuban baseball player. He was a member of Cuba's silver medal-winning baseball team in the 2000 Summer Olympics.
