= 1958 NAIA World Series =

1958 NAIA baseball tournament
- 1958 NAIA World Series
- Teams: 12
- Format: Single elimination, with consolation bracket
- Finals site: Kokernot Field; Alpine, Texas
- Champions: San Diego State (1st title)
- Winning coach: Charlie Smith (1st title)
- MVP: Al Miranda (Sul Ross State)

The 1958 NAIA World Series was the second annual tournament hosted by the National Association of Intercollegiate Athletics to determine the national champion of baseball among its member colleges and universities in the United States and Canada.

The tournament was played at Kokernot Field in Alpine, Texas, near the campus of Sul Ross State College.

San Diego State defeated Southwestern State (OK) in the championship game, 23–9, to win the Aztecs' first NAIA World Series.

Sul Ross State player Al Miranda, meanwhile, was named tournament MVP.

The tournament field increased by four teams from the inaugural event, growing from eight to twelve teams.

== Bracket ==
=== Championship bracket ===
First round
Elon	10
Indiana State	8
Adams State	0
St. Cloud State	9
Mayville State	15
Ozarks	6
Fairmont State	6
Simpson (IA)	3

Second round
San Diego State	11
Elon	1
St. Cloud State	12
Sul Ross State	8
Southwestern State (OK)	11
Mayville State	1
Fairmont State	2
Creighton	12

Semifinals
San Diego State	17
St. Cloud State	0
Southwestern State	6
Creighton	3

Championship
San Diego State	23
Southwestern State	9
Third-place game
St. Cloud State	6
Creighton	5

=== Consolation bracket ===
Consolation First round
Elon	6
Indiana State	12
Sul Ross State	7
Adams State	6
Mayville State	12
Ozarks	13
Fairmont State	2
Simpson	15

Consolation Second round
Indiana State	1
Sul Ross State	10
Ozarks	6
Simpson	8

Fifth Place Game
Sul Ross State	10
Simpson	13

== See also ==
- 1958 NCAA University Division baseball tournament
