= Graeme Hole =

Australian cricketer (1931–1990)

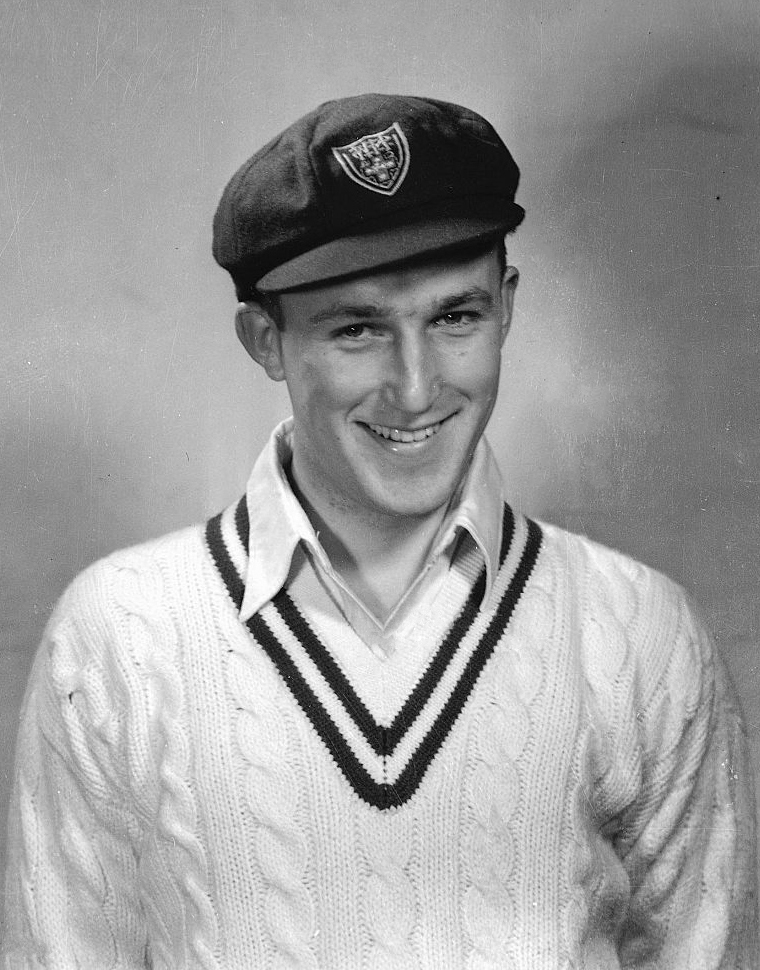
- Hole in 1949

Personal information
- Born: 6 January 1931; Concord West, New South Wales
- Died: 14 February 1990 (aged 59); Kensington Gardens, South Australia
- Batting: Right-handed
- Bowling: Right-arm offbreak

International information
- National side: Australia
- Test debut (cap 188): 23 February 1951 v England
- Last Test: 31 December 1954 v England

Career statistics
Competition	Test	First-class
Matches	18	98
Runs scored	789	5,647
Batting average	25.45	36.66
100s/50s	0/6	11/31
Top score	66	226
Balls bowled	398	6,327
Wickets	3	61
Bowling average	42.00	44.03
5 wickets in innings	0	1
10 wickets in match	0	0
Best bowling	1/9	5/109
Catches/stumpings	21/–	82/–
- Source: Cricinfo, 14 October 2022

Graeme Blake Hole (6 January 1931 – 14 February 1990) was an Australian cricketer who played 18 Test matches between 1951 and 1955.

== Career ==
A right-handed middle-order batsman and off-spinner, Hole played 98 first-class matches between 1949–50 and 1957–58. He made his first-class debut for New South Wales at the age of 19. During this match, he didn't do very well in batting, but he made up for this during his bowling. He then moved to South Australia and started playing for them. His debut in international cricket came when he was selected for the Australian team against England in February 1951.

Before he made his international cricket debut, Hole played baseball in the off-season in the local New South Wales competition, before moving to South Australia in 1950 where he would be invited to play for the South Australia state baseball team in the 1950 Claxton Shield. However, he was ultimately declined by the Australian Baseball Council to play as he did not meet a six-month state residency requirement.

After he tore his spleen in a catch to dismiss Sam Loxton, he was forced to retire three terms early, before his contract ran out. After he retired, he joined the Australian Cricket Association. He died of cancer on 14 February 1990.
