= 1958 Lafayette Leopards baseball team =

American college baseball season

1958 Lafayette Leopards baseball

District II champions

College World Series, T-7th
- Conference: Independent
- Record: 19–10
- Head coach: Charlie Gelbert (13th season)
- Home stadium: Fisher Field

The 1958 Lafayette Leopards baseball team represented Lafayette College in the 1958 NCAA University Division baseball season. The Leopards played their home games at Fisher Field. The team was coached by Charlie Gelbert in his 13th year at Lafayette.

The Leopards won the District II Playoff to advanced to the College World Series, where they were defeated by the Western Michigan Broncos.

== Roster ==
1958 Lafayette Leopards baseball team
Players
Coaches

#	Pos.	Name	B/T	Height	Weight	Year	Home town
	OF	Dick Archdeacon	/	—	—
		Bendere	/	—	—
	C	Sandy Bing	/	—	—
	INF	Phil Bollman	/	—	—
	OF	Joe Bozik	/	—	—
	INF	Al Caeser	/	—	—	Sr
	P	Bill Evanko	/	—	—	So
	INF	Frank Farzanegan	/	—	—
	P	Vince Gebhard	/	—	—	So
	INF	Bob Kessler	/	—	—
	OF	Skip Kline	/	—	—
	C	Bob Lewis	/	—	—
	OF	Bill MacDonald	/	—	—
		Dick Maurer	/	—	—
	INF	Tom Morgan (C)	/	—	—	Sr
	OF	Dick Nikles	/	—	—
	INF	Dick Richter	/	—	—
	C	Charlie Rose	/	—	—
	P	Irv Sandell	/	—	—	So
	C	Ted Sloan	/	—	—
	LHP	Ray Smith	/	—	—

Head coach

Charlie Gelbert

Assistant coach(es)

Legend

- (C) Team captain
- (S) Suspended
- (I) Ineligible
- Injured
- Current redshirt

== Schedule ==
1958 Lafayette Leopards baseball game log
Regular season
April (13–3)

#	Date	Opponent	Site/stadium	Score	Overall record
1	April 1	at NC State	Ernie Shore Stadium • Winston-Salem, North Carolina	7–13	0–1
2	April 1	vs Massachusetts	Ernie Shore Stadium • Winston-Salem, North Carolina	3–5	0–2
3	April 2	vs Princeton	Ernie Shore Stadium • Winston-Salem, North Carolina	6–1	1–2
4	April 4	at Quantico Marines	Unknown • Quantico, Virginia	2–1	2–2
5	April 5	at George Washington	Unknown • Washington, D.C.	16–4	3–2
6	April 9	at Navy	Unknown • Annapolis, Maryland	7–0	4–2
7	April 10	Muhlenberg	Fisher Field • Easton, Pennsylvania	17–7	5–2
8	April 14	Moravian	Fisher Field • Easton, Pennsylvania	7–2	6–2
9	April 16	at La Salle	Unknown • Philadelphia, Pennsylvania	7–0	7–2
10	April 18	at Bucknell	Unknown • Lewisburg, Pennsylvania	10–2	8–2
11	April 19	Colgate	Fisher Field • Easton, Pennsylvania	3–2	9–2
12	April 21	Temple	Fisher Field • Easton, Pennsylvania	10–1	10–2
13	April 23	at Gettysburg	Unknown • Gettysburg, Pennsylvania	6–5	11–2
14	April 25	at Villanova	Unknown • Philadelphia, Pennsylvania	5–10	11–3
15	April 26	Rutgers	Fisher Field • Easton, Pennsylvania	7–0	12–3
16	April 29	at Swarthmore	Unknown • Swarthmore, Pennsylvania	17–7	13–3

May (3–4)

#	Date	Opponent	Site/stadium	Score	Overall record
17	May 1	at Delaware	Unknown • Newark, Delaware	3–4	13–4
18	May 10	Lehigh	Fisher Field • Easton, Pennsylvania	5–0	14–4
19	May 12	Albright	Fisher Field • Easton, Pennsylvania	8–2	15–4
20	May 14	at Rutgers	Bainton Field • Piscataway, New Jersey	8–9	15–5
21	May 17	at Penn State	New Beaver Field • University Park, Pennsylvania	8–7	16–5
22	May 23	Delaware	Fisher Field • Easton, Pennsylvania	6–9	16–6
23	May 24	Fordham	Fisher Field • Easton, Pennsylvania	1–2	16–7

Postseason
District II Playoff (2–0)

#	Date	Opponent	Site/stadium	Score	Overall record
24	May 29	vs Penn State	Unknown • Philadelphia, Pennsylvania	9–1	17–7
25	May 30	vs NYU	Unknown • Philadelphia, Pennsylvania	5–1	18–7

May / June (1–1)

#	Date	Opponent	Site/stadium	Score	Overall record
26	May 31	Rider	Fisher Field • Easton, Pennsylvania	6–5	19–7
27	May 29	vs Fort Dix	Fisher Field • Easton, Pennsylvania	7–10	19–8

College World Series (0–2)

#	pri	Opponent	Site/stadium	Score	Overall record
28	June 14	vs Colorado State College	Omaha Municipal Stadium • Omaha, Nebraska	5–10	19–9
29	June 15	vs Western Michigan	Omaha Municipal Stadium • Omaha, Nebraska	3–4	19–10
