= 1999 Intercontinental Cup (baseball) =

Tournament details
- Country: Australia
- City: Sydney
- Dates: 3 – 14 November
- Teams: 8
- Defending champions: Japan

Final positions
- Champions: Australia (1st title)
- Runners-up: Cuba
- Third place: Japan
- Fourth place: United States

Tournament statistics
- Games played: 32
- Best BA: (Japan) Akinori Iwamura (.447)
- Most HRs: (Australia) Michael Moyle (Cuba) Oscar Macías (3)
- Most SBs: (Cuba) Yobel Duenas (5)
- Best ERA: (Japan) Taiyo Fujita (0.00)

Awards
- MVP: (Australia) Dave Nilsson

The 1999 IBAF Intercontinental Cup was held in Australia from 3 to 14 November 1999. Eight countries contested the tournament, and has been the only Intercontinental Cup hosted in the Southern Hemisphere. The eight participating countries were Cuba, Australia, Italy, the Netherlands, Japan, South Korea, United States and Chinese Taipei. The tournament was sanctioned by the International Baseball Federation.

The Cup was perhaps the brightest moment in the history of the Australia national baseball team, as they stunned the Cuba national baseball team in the finals, winning the game 4–3. The MVP of the tournament was also Australian MLB player and former All-Star, Dave Nilsson.

== All-Star team ==
- C: Dave Nilsson, Australia
- 1B: Dan Held, USA
- 2B: Oscar Macías, Cuba
- SS: Danel Castro, Cuba
- 3B: Akinori Iwamura, Japan
- OF: Yuan-Chia Chen, Chinese Taipei
- OF: Yobal Dueñas, Cuba
- OF: Claudio Liverziani, Italy
- DH: Michael Moyle, Australia
- P: Faustino Corrales, Cuba
- P: Adrian Meagher, Australia
