= 1958 Clemson Tigers baseball team =

American college baseball season

1958 Clemson Tigers baseball

ACC champions District 3 champions

College World Series, 1–2
- Conference: Atlantic Coast Conference
- Record: 22–8 (12–3 ACC)
- Head coach: Bill Wilhelm
- Home stadium: Riggs Field

1958 Atlantic Coast Conference baseball standings
	Conf.				Overall
Team	W		L	PCT	W		L	PCT
Clemson ‍†‍‡‍^{y}	11	–	3	.786	22	–	8	.733
North Carolina ‍†‍‍	11	–	3	.786	19	–	8	.704
Duke ‍‍‍	7	–	5	.583	9	–	11	.450
Wake Forest ‍‍‍	7	–	6	.538	12	–	9	.571
NC State ‍‍‍	6	–	7	.462	10	–	7	.588
Virginia ‍‍‍	4	–	9	.308	5	–	15	.250
Maryland ‍‍‍	4	–	10	.286	7	–	11	.389
South Carolina ‍‍‍	3	–	10	.231	7	–	14	.333
† – Conference champion ‡ – Playoff champion y – Invited to the NCAA tournament As of June 30, 1958; Rankings from Collegiate Baseball

The 1958 Clemson Tigers baseball team represented Clemson University in the 1958 NCAA University Division baseball season. The team played their home games at Riggs Field in Clemson, South Carolina.

The team was coached by Bill Wilhelm, who completed his first season at Clemson. The Tigers reached the 1958 College World Series, their first appearance in Omaha.

== Roster ==
1958 Clemson Tigers roster
Pitchers: - Ed Lakey; - Harold Stowe	Catchers: - Butch Coker; - Clayton Lowder Jr.; Infielders: - Larry Bagwell; - Zack Burnette; - Fred DeBerry; - Bud Spiers	Outfielders: - Bailey Hendley; - Doug Hoffman; - Larry Wilson	Unknown: - Gus Abbott; - Leon McDonald

== Schedule ==
Legend
	Clemson win
	Clemson loss
**Bold**	Clemson team member
*	Non-Conference game

1958 Clemson Tigers baseball game log
Regular season

March/April
Date	Opponent	Site/stadium	Score	Overall record	ACC Record
Mar 24	Michigan State*	Riggs Field • Clemson, SC	**W** 7–5^{7}	1–0	
Mar 27	at Furman*	Furman Baseball Stadium • Greenville, SC	**W** 9–1	2–0	
Mar 31	at The Citadel*	WLI Field • Charleston, SC	**W** 5–4^{11}	3–0	
Apr 2	The Citadel*	Riggs Field • Clemson, SC	**W** 23–9	4–0	
Apr 3	Michigan State*	Riggs Field • Clemson, SC	**L** 2–3	4–1	
Apr 4	Virginia	Riggs Field • Clemson, SC	**W** 10–1	5–1	1–0
Apr 5	Maryland	Riggs Field • Clemson, SC	**W** 6–2	6–1	2–0
Apr 8	at Georgia Tech*	Ag. Hill • Athens, GA	**L** 1–8	6–2	
Apr 9	North Carolina	Riggs Field • Clemson, SC	**W** 2–1	7–2	3–0
Apr 14	at Virginia	Charlottesville, VA	**W** 10–4	8–2	4–0
Apr 15	at Maryland	College Park, MD	**W** 13–4	9–2	5–0
Apr 16	at NC State	Riddick Stadium • Raleigh, NC	**W** 6–5	10–2	6–0
Apr 17	Wake Forest	Riggs Field • Clemson, SC	**W** 12–8	11–2	7–0
Apr 21	South Carolina	Riggs Field • Clemson, SC	**W** 5–3	12–2	8–0
Apr 25	at North Carolina	Emerson Field • Chapel Hill, NC	**L** 1–2	12–3	8–1
Apr 26	at Wake Forest	Ernie Shore Field • Winston-Salem, NC	**L** 4–5	12–4	8–2

May
Date	Opponent	Site/stadium	Score	Overall record	ACC Record
May 1	at Duke	Jack Coombs Field • Durham, NC	**W** 8–1	13–4	9–2
May 3	at NC State	Riddick Stadium • Raleigh, NC	**W** 15–11	14–4	10–2
May 8	Furman*	Riggs Field • Clemson, SC	**W** 11–6	15–4	
May 9	at South Carolina	Columbia, SC	**W** 9–2	16–4	11–2
May 12	at Duke	Jack Coombs Field • Durham, NC	**L** 1–7	16–5	11–3

Postseason

ACC playoffs
Date	Opponent	Site/stadium	Score	Overall record	Playoff record
May 19	North Carolina	Sims Legion Park • Gastonia, NC	**W** 4–1	17–5	1–0

NCAA District 3 Regional
Date	Opponent	Site/stadium	Score	Overall record	Regional Record
June 5	Florida	Sims Legion Park • Gastonia, NC	**L** 6–8	17–6	0–1
June 7	George Washington	Sims Legion Park • Gastonia, NC	**W** 4–2	18–6	1–1
June 7	Florida State	Sims Legion Park • Gastonia, NC	**W** 8–5^{10}	19–6	2–1
June 9	Florida	Sims Legion Park • Gastonia, NC	**W** 15–14	20–6	3–1
June 9	Florida	Sims Legion Park • Gastonia, NC	**W** 3–1	21–6	4–1

NCAA College World Series
Date	Opponent	Site/stadium	Score	Overall record	CWS record
June 14	Arizona	Johnny Rosenblatt Stadium • Omaha, NE	**W** 4–1	22–6	1–0
June 15	Holy Cross	Johnny Rosenblatt Stadium • Omaha, NE	**L** 4–17	22–7	1–1
June 16	Western Michigan	Johnny Rosenblatt Stadium • Omaha, NE	**L** 3–5	22–8	1–2
