= 1958 Holy Cross Crusaders baseball team =

American college baseball season

1958 Holy Cross Crusaders baseball

District I champions

College World Series, 4th
- Conference: Independent
- Record: 18–6
- Head coach: Jack Barry (38th season)
- Captain: Tom Ryan
- Home stadium: Fitton Field

The 1958 Holy Cross Crusaders baseball team represented the College of the Holy Cross in the 1958 NCAA University Division baseball season. The Crusaders played their home games at Fitton Field. The team was coached by Jack Barry in his 38th year as head coach at Holy Cross.

The Crusaders won the District I playoff to advance to the College World Series, where they were defeated by the Southern California Trojans.

== Roster ==
1958 Holy Cross Crusaders baseball team
Players
Coaches

#	Pos.	Name	B/T	Height	Weight	Year	Home town
	P	Hal Dietz	/	—	—
	P	Robert Defino	L/L	—	—
	P	Jim Farino	/	—	—
	INF	Ken Komodzinski	/	—	—	So
	INF	Ronnie Liptak	/	—	—
	C	Larry Rancourt	/	—	—
	INF	Tom Ryan (C)	/	—	—	Sr

Head coach

Jack Barry

Assistant coach(es)

Legend

- (C) Team captain
- (S) Suspended
- (I) Ineligible
- Injured
- Current redshirt

Roster
Last update: October 2, 2021

== Schedule ==
1958 Holy Cross Crusaders baseball game log
Regular season
April (–)

#	Date	Opponent	Site/stadium	Score	Overall record
	April 19	Dartmouth	Fitton Field • Worcester, Massachusetts	4–6	–
	April 24	Tufts	Unknown • Unknown	5–2	–

May (–)

#	Date	Opponent	Site/stadium	Score	Overall record
	May 10	Harvard	Fitton Field • Worcester, Massachusetts	11–3	–
	May 21	Connecticut	Unknown • Unknown	10–0	–

Postseason
District I Playoff (3–0)

#	Date	Opponent	Site/stadium	Score	Overall record
18	June 4	vs Colby	Unknown • Springfield, Massachusetts	4–3	14–4
19	June 4	vs Colby	Unknown • Springfield, Massachusetts	5–1	15–4
20	June 8	vs Connecticut	Unknown • Springfield, Massachusetts	2–1	16–4

College World Series (2–2)

#	Date	Opponent	Site/stadium	Score	Overall record
21	June 14	vs Southern California	Omaha Municipal Stadium • Omaha, Nebraska	3–0	17–4
22	June 15	vs Clemson	Omaha Municipal Stadium • Omaha, Nebraska	17–4	18–4
23	June 16	vs Missouri	Omaha Municipal Stadium • Omaha, Nebraska	1–4	18–5
24	June 17	vs Southern California	Omaha Municipal Stadium • Omaha, Nebraska	2–6	18–6

== Awards and honors ==
Ken Komodzinski

- College World Series All-Tournament Team
