= Peter Gahan =

Australian baseball player

Peter Gahan (born 14 September 1956 in Lismore, New South Wales) is an Australian baseball player who played 45 games for the Australian national team between 1979–1987.

He also played for the Queensland Rams from 1978–1982 and 1984–1987 and for the New South Wales Patriots in 1983.

Gahan was the Far North Coast Baseball Association (FNCBA) MVP a record five times, and is the only player from the FNCBA to have their player number retired (#17).

One highlight of Gahan's career was being named in the World All Star team at the World Games in Santa Clara in 1981.

He was the winner of the Northern New South Wales Sports Star of the Year in 1982, the same year as the Southern New South Wales Sports Star of the Year Mick Cronin.
