= Dick Griesser =

American college baseball player

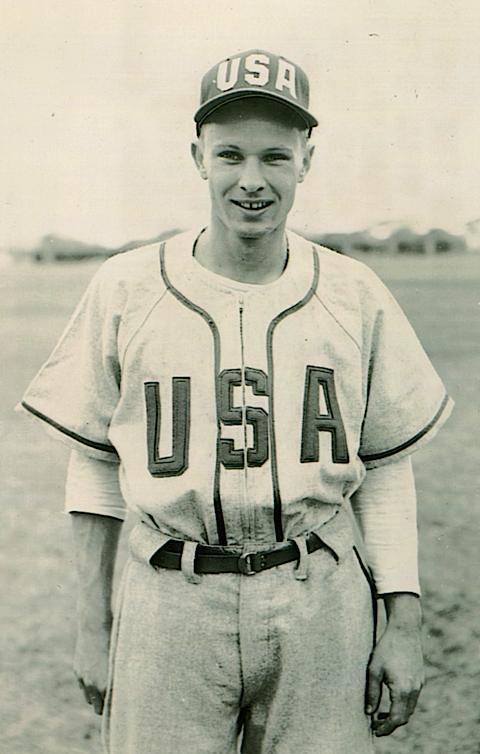
- Outfielder
- Born: July 21, 1932; Pekin, Illinois
- Died: August 22, 2009 (aged 77); Tucson, Arizona

Richard Korneil Griesser (July 21, 1932 — August 22, 2009) was an American baseball outfielder. He played college baseball with the University of Arizona Wildcats in the early 1950s, during a period where Frank Sancet coached them to three successive College World Series appearances (1954–56). While serving in the United States Army in South Korea, he was selected to the U.S. national team that played in the 1956 Summer Olympics in Melbourne, Australia. He also played on the all-star team for the U.S. Army South Korea Military Command.

After leaving the Army, Griesser returned to Arizona and led them to another appearance at the 1958 College World Series. Batting .377 that year, he was named a first-team Collegiate All-American. He later coached high school baseball and football, as well as a professional softball team that won the national championship in 1976. Griesser was inducted into the University of Arizona Athletics Hall of Fame in 2003.
