= Bernie Parrish =

American football player (1936–2019)

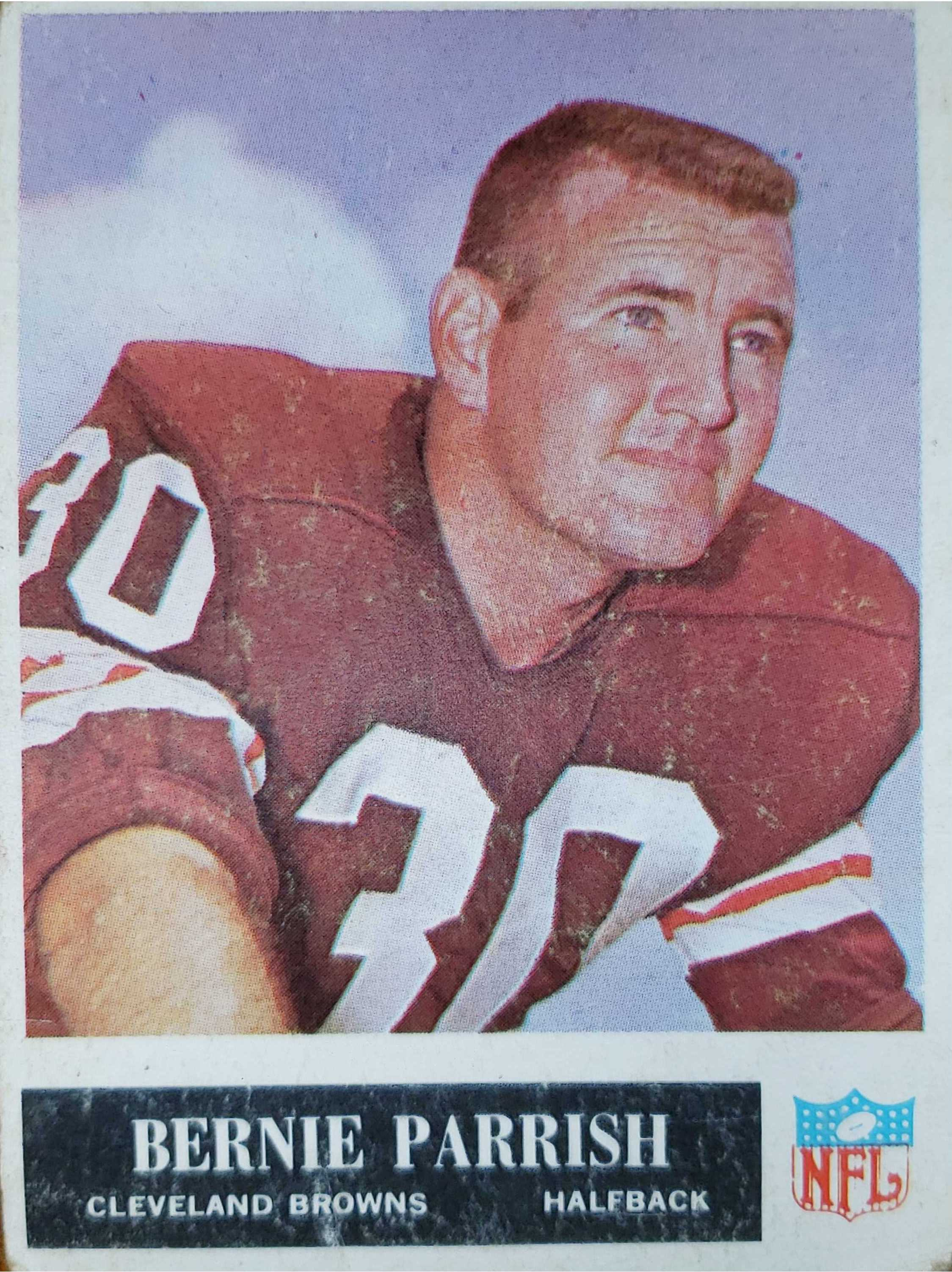
- Parrish on a 1964 NFL playing card

No. 30
- Position: Cornerback

Personal information
- Born: April 29, 1936; Long Beach, California, U.S.
- Died: October 23, 2019 (aged 83); Springfield, Missouri, U.S.
- Listed height: 5 ft 11 in (1.80 m)
- Listed weight: 194 lb (88 kg)

Career information
- High school: P.K. Yonge (Gainesville, Florida)
- College: Florida
- NFL draft: 1958: 9th round, 108th overall pick

Career history
- Cleveland Browns (1959–1966); Houston Oilers (1966)

Awards and highlights
- NFL champion (1964); Second-team All-Pro (1964); 2× Pro Bowl (1960, 1963); Cleveland Browns Legends; University of Florida Athletic Hall of Fame

Career NFL/AFL statistics
- Interceptions: 31
- INT return yards: 557
- Total touchdowns: 4
- Stats at Pro Football Reference

Bernard Paul Parrish (April 29, 1936 – October 23, 2019) was an American professional football player who was a cornerback in the National Football League (NFL) and American Football League (AFL) for eight seasons during the 1950s and 1960s. Parrish played college football for the Florida Gators, and thereafter, he played for the Cleveland Browns of the NFL and the Houston Oilers of the AFL. Parrish's football memoirs later stirred controversy.

== Early life ==
Parrish was born in Long Beach, California, in 1936. He grew up in Gainesville, Florida, where he attended P.K. Yonge High School and played high school football and baseball for the P.K. Yonge Blue Wave.

== College career ==
Parrish accepted an athletic scholarship to attend the University of Florida in Gainesville, and played halfback and defensive back for coach Bob Woodruff's Florida Gators football team in 1956 and 1957. Memorably, Parrish was named Associated Press "Back of the Week" for his performance in the Gators' 14–7 win over the Vanderbilt Commodores, including rushing for 111 yards, scoring both touchdowns, kicking both extra points, catching an interception, and making seven tackles—including one to prevent the Commodores' tying score. He also played second base for coach Dave Fuller's Florida Gators baseball team from 1956 to 1958. As a junior in 1958, he batted .433 and led the Gators in runs batted in, hits, doubles and home runs, received first-team All-Southeastern conference (SEC) honors, and was the Gators' first-ever first-team baseball All-American.

Parrish decided to forgo his senior year of NCAA eligibility, and accepted a Major League Baseball bonus contract. Parrish returned to Gainesville during the NFL off-season to complete his degree and graduated from Florida with a bachelor's degree in building construction in 1960. He was later inducted into the University of Florida Athletic Hall of Fame as a "Gator Great."

== Professional career ==
The Cleveland Browns selected Parrish in the ninth round (108th pick overall) of the 1958 NFL draft, and he played for the Browns from 1959 to 1966. Memorably, he returned one interception for 92 yards and a touchdown in 1960, and intercepted a pass from the great Y. A. Tittle in his last game in 1964 (Tittle himself had to tackle Parrish to keep him from scoring). Parrish was a key man of the Browns' defense on their run to winning the 1964 NFL championship. In his seven seasons with the Browns, he had 29 interceptions, including three returned for touchdowns. After playing in one game of the 1966 season, Parrish requested that he be released because the Browns asked him to share time at his position with another player, and played the balance of the 1966 season (11 games) for the Houston Oilers of the AFL before retiring at season's end.

In his eight-year professional football career, Parrish played in 105 regular season games, recorded a total of 31 interceptions, and returned those interceptions for 557 yards and three touchdowns.

== Life after the NFL ==
During his time with the Browns, Parrish served as team representative to the National Football League Players Association (NFLPA), and later NFLPA vice president. After retiring as a player, Parrish worked with the Teamsters in the late 1960s in an unsuccessful attempt to organize a new Teamsters-affiliated NFL/AFL players' union. At the Teamsters, he worked for Harold J. Gibbons, the heir apparent to Jimmy Hoffa.

In 1971, Parrish wrote a best-selling book, They Call It A Game, published by The Dial Press, about the economics and politics of the NFL. His book included the controversial allegation that the NFL had fixed the outcomes of some of its games. Some critics, however, expressed the opinion that Parrish had failed to substantiate such claims in any material way.

Parrish enjoyed a second career as a hotel developer before retiring to spend more time with his wife and family. In 2007, Parrish and former Green Bay Packers cornerback Herb Adderley filed a class action suit on behalf of retired NFL players against the NFLPA and Players, Inc., a subsidiary of the NFLPA, over retired players' benefits derived from player image and name licensing fees. While Parrish was eventually dismissed from the suit as a lead plaintiff of the represented class, the trial jury found in favor of the retired players and awarded a $28.1 million judgment against the NFLPA and Players, Inc., including $21 million in punitive damages. The NFLPA appealed the judgment in February 2009, but eventually settled the case without further litigation.

Parrish was a harsh critic of the late NFLPA President Gene Upshaw, and publicly excoriated Upshaw's record on providing disability and medical assistance to retired NFL players. While many retired players agreed with Parrish's criticisms of Upshaw, many of them and other observers believed that Parrish went too far in his attacks against Upshaw when he strongly implied that Upshaw was involved in the death of his first wife. Upshaw's first wife apparently died of natural causes, she and Upshaw had been divorced for over a decade at the time of her death, and police investigators said Upshaw was not a suspect or person of interest in any investigation. A Sports Illustrated article about the rift between retired players and Upshaw made it clear that former players hesitated before contacting Parrish to speak to the press about Upshaw. He died on October 23, 2019, from prostate cancer.

== Cleveland Browns Legends Hall ==
On October 1, 2017, Parrish was inducted into the Cleveland Browns Legends hall along with Tony Adamle at halftime of a game with the cross-state rival Cincinnati Bengals.

== See also ==
- 1958 College Baseball All-America Team
- Florida Gators football, 1950–59
- History of the Cleveland Browns
- List of American Football League players
- List of Florida Gators in the NFL draft
- List of University of Florida alumni
- List of University of Florida Athletic Hall of Fame members
