= 1958 Arizona Wildcats baseball team =

American university baseball season

1958 Arizona Wildcats baseball

District VI champions

College World Series, T-7th
- Conference: Border Conference
- Record: 38–14 (7–1 Border)
- Head coach: Frank Sancet (9th season)
- Home stadium: UA Field

The 1958 Arizona Wildcats baseball team represented the University of Arizona in the 1958 NCAA University Division baseball season. The Wildcats played their home games at UA Field. The team was coached by Frank Sancet in his 9th year at Arizona.

The Wildcats won the District VI Playoff to advance to the College World Series, where they were defeated by the USC Trojans.

== Roster ==
1958 Arizona Wildcats baseball team
Players
Coaches

#	Pos.	Name	B/T	Height	Weight	Year	Home town
	P	Dave Baldwin	/	—	—
		Chad Brucker	/	—	—
		John Colyer	/	—	—
		Kenny Coopwood	/	—	—
		Matt Encinas	/	—	—	So
		Billy Farrell	/	—	—
		Larry Fivecoat	/	—	—
		Jim Geist	/	—	—	So
	OF	Dick Griesser	/	—	—
		Alan Hall	/	—	—	So
		Lee Hersh	/	—	—
		Larry Hoffman	/	—	—	So
		Martin Hurd	/	—	—
		Gene Leek	/	—	—
		Bob Maxwell	/	—	—
		Jim McConnell	/	—	—
		Jim McGuire	/	—	—
	INF	Larry Messick	/	—	—
		Dick Nixon	/	—	—
		Jim Nowinski	/	—	—
		Norman Popkin	/	—	—
		Lionel Romero	/	—	—
		Linn Wallace	/	—	—	So
		Jerry Wamsley	/	—	—
	P	Jim Ward	/	—	—	So
		Jimmy Wilson	/	—	—

Head coach

45 Frank Sancet

Assistant coach(es)

Al Hovagian

Legend

- (C) Team captain
- (S) Suspended
- (I) Ineligible
- Injured
- Current redshirt

== Schedule ==
1958 Arizona Wildcats baseball game log
Regular season
March (16–1)

#	Date	Opponent	Site/stadium	Score	Overall record	Border record
1	March 8	Marine Corps Base Camp Pendleton	UA Field • Tucson, Arizona	8–2	1–0	–
2	March 10	Sul Ross	UA Field • Tucson, Arizona	10–4	2–0	–
3	March 11	Sul Ross	UA Field • Tucson, Arizona	7–6	3–0	–
4	March 14	New Mexico	UA Field • Tucson, Arizona	18–1	4–0	1–0
5	March 15	New Mexico	UA Field • Tucson, Arizona	9–5	5–0	2–0
6	March 18	Colorado State College	UA Field • Tucson, Arizona	17–3	6–0	2–0
7	March 19	Colorado State College	UA Field • Tucson, Arizona	15–1	7–0	2–0
8	March 21	Air Force	UA Field • Tucson, Arizona	10–6	8–0	2–0
9	March 22	Air Force	UA Field • Tucson, Arizona	10–6	9–0	2–0
10	March 22	Air Force	UA Field • Tucson, Arizona	11–3	10–0	2–0
11	March 24	Utah	UA Field • Tucson, Arizona	5–7	10–1	2–0
12	March 25	Utah	UA Field • Tucson, Arizona	14–4	11–1	2–0
13	March 26	Utah	UA Field • Tucson, Arizona	5–4	12–1	2–0
14	March 27	Wyoming	UA Field • Tucson, Arizona	19–8	13–1	2–0
15	March 28	Wyoming	UA Field • Tucson, Arizona	9–1	14–1	2–0
16	March 29	Wyoming	UA Field • Tucson, Arizona	14–7	15–1	2–0
17	March 31	Iowa	UA Field • Tucson, Arizona	11–4	16–1	2–0

April (12–8)

#	Date	Opponent	Site/stadium	Score	Overall record	Border record
18	April 1	Iowa	UA Field • Tucson, Arizona	8–0	17–1	2–0
19	April 2	Iowa	UA Field • Tucson, Arizona	7–6	18–1	2–0
20	April 3	Iowa	UA Field • Tucson, Arizona	16–6	19–1	2–0
21	April 5	Iowa	UA Field • Tucson, Arizona	7–9	19–2	2–0
22	April 5	Iowa	UA Field • Tucson, Arizona	3–8	19–3	2–0
23	April 8	at Pepperdine	Unknown • Malibu, California	5–3	20–3	2–0
24	April 9	at Cal State Los Angeles	Reeder Field • Los Angeles, California	2–0	21–3	2–0
25	April 9	at Cal State Los Angeles	Reeder Field • Los Angeles, California	4–2	22–3	2–0
26	April 10	at Pepperdine	Unknown • Malibu, California	4–8	22–4	2–0
27	April 11	at UCLA	Joe E. Brown Field • Los Angeles, California	3–2	24–4	2–0
28	April 12	at UCLA	Joe E. Brown Field • Los Angeles, California	3–7	23–5	2–0
29	April 15	Davis–Monthan Air Force Base	UA Field • Tucson, Arizona	5–4	24–5	2–0
30	April 19	at Arizona State	Unknown • Tempe, Arizona	3–7	24–6	2–1
31	April 19	at Arizona State	Unknown • Tempe, Arizona	3–2	25–6	3–1
32	April 22	Davis–Monthan Air Force Base	UA Field • Tucson, Arizona	11–2	26–6	3–1
33	April 25	Pepperdine	UA Field • Tucson, Arizona	5–3	27–6	3–1
34	April 26	Pepperdine	UA Field • Tucson, Arizona	14–16	27–7	3–1
35	April 28	San Diego Marines	UA Field • Tucson, Arizona	9–4	28–7	3–1
36	April 29	San Diego Marines	UA Field • Tucson, Arizona	6–10	28–8	3–1
37	April 30	Fort Huachuca	UA Field • Tucson, Arizona	1–5	28–9	3–1

May (8–02)

#	Date	Opponent	Site/stadium	Score	Overall record	Border record
38	May 3	Arizona State	UA Field • Tucson, Arizona	10–0	29–9	4–1
39	May 3	Arizona State	UA Field • Tucson, Arizona	2–1	30–9	5–1
40	May 6	Davis–Monthan Air Force Base	UA Field • Tucson, Arizona	15–0	31–9	5–1
41	May 7	New Mexico A&M	UA Field • Tucson, Arizona	9–0	32–9	6–1
42	May 8	New Mexico A&M	UA Field • Tucson, Arizona	24–1	33–9	7–1
43	May 9	Casa Grande	UA Field • Tucson, Arizona	4–6	33–10	7–1
44	May 12	Davis–Monthan Air Force Base	UA Field • Tucson, Arizona	18–2	34–10	7–1
45	May 13	Davis–Monthan Air Force Base	UA Field • Tucson, Arizona	17–3	35–10	7–1
46	May 15	Fort Huachuca	UA Field • Tucson, Arizona	13–8	36–10	7–1
47	May 17	Casa Grande	UA Field • Tucson, Arizona	4–9	36–11	7–1

Postseason
NCAA District VI Playoff (2–1)

#	Date	Opponent	Site/stadium	Score	Overall record	Border record
48	June 5	Texas	UA Field • Tucson, Arizona	3–14	36–12	7–1
49	June 6	Texas	UA Field • Tucson, Arizona	16–4	37–12	7–1
50	June 7	Texas	UA Field • Tucson, Arizona	5–2	38–12	7–1

College World Series (0–2)

#	Date	Opponent	Site/stadium	Score	Overall record	Border record
51	June 14	vs Clemson	Omaha Municipal Stadium • Omaha, Nebraska	1–4	38–13	7–1
52	June 15	vs Southern California	Omaha Municipal Stadium • Omaha, Nebraska	0–4	38–14	7–1

== Awards and honors ==
Dick Griesser

First Team All-American American Baseball Coaches Association

Harry Messick

Second Team All-American American Baseball Coaches Association
