= Akinori Iwamura =

Japanese baseball player & manager (born 1979)

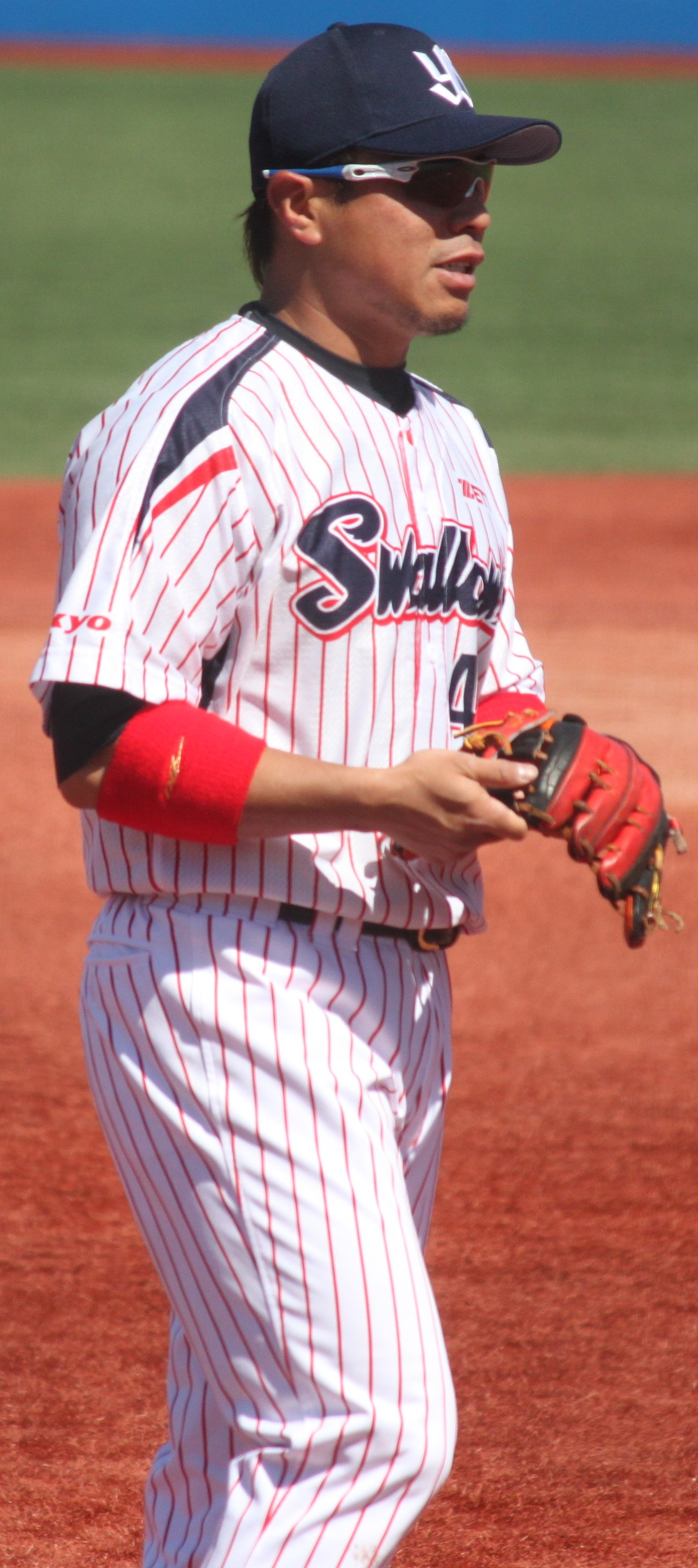
- Iwamura with the Tokyo Yakult Swallows in 2013
- Infielder
- Born: February 9, 1979 (age 47); Uwajima, Ehime, Japan
- Batted: Left Threw: Right

Professional debut
- NPB: May 19, 1998, for the Yakult Swallows
- MLB: April 2, 2007, for the Tampa Bay Devil Rays

Last appearance
- MLB: September 26, 2010, for the Oakland Athletics
- NPB: 2014, for the Tokyo Yakult Swallows

NPB statistics
- Batting average: .290
- Home runs: 193
- Runs batted in: 615

MLB statistics
- Batting average: .267
- Home runs: 16
- Runs batted in: 117
- Stats at Baseball Reference

Teams
- Yakult Swallows / Tokyo Yakult Swallows (1998–2006); Tampa Bay Devil Rays / Rays (2007–2009); Pittsburgh Pirates (2010); Oakland Athletics (2010); Tohoku Rakuten Golden Eagles (2011–2012); Tokyo Yakult Swallows (2013–2014)

Career highlights and awards
- 3× NPB All-Star (2001, 2004, 2005); 6× Mitsui Golden Glove Award (2000–2002, 2004–2006)
Medals
Representing Japan
Men's baseball
World Baseball Classic
Gold medal – first place	2006 San Diego	Team Competition
Gold medal – first place	2009 Los Angeles	Team Competition
Intercontinental Cup
Bronze medal – third place	1999 Sydney	Team Competition

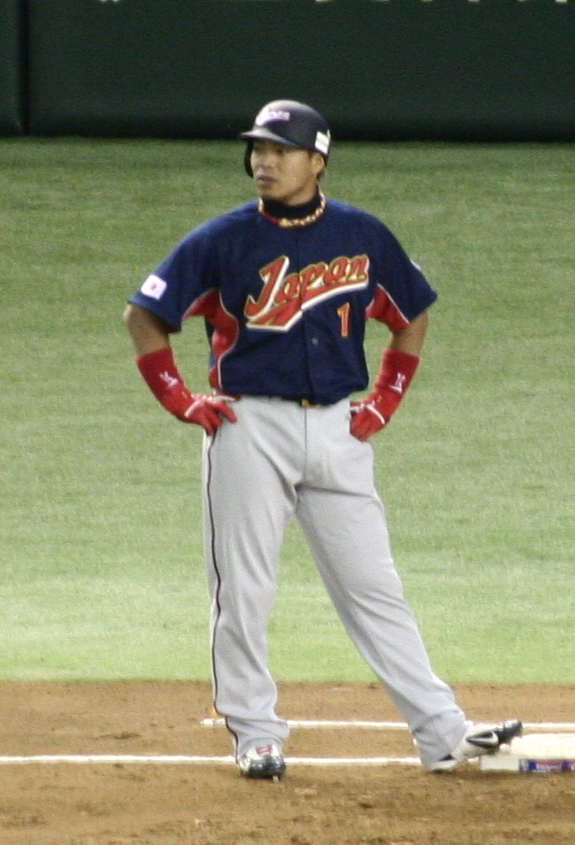
Iwamura played for Japan in the 2006 World Baseball Classic.

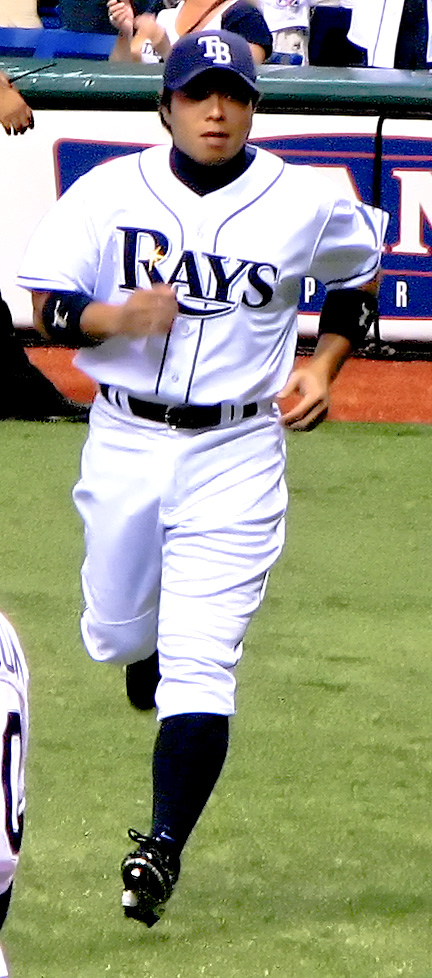
Iwamura on Opening Day 2008

Akinori Iwamura (岩村 明憲, Iwamura Akinori; born February 9, 1979) is a former Japanese baseball infielder, who currently is a manager for the Fukushima Red Hopes in Japan's Baseball Challenge League. He made his Major League debut with the Tampa Bay Devil Rays in 2007.

He earned the nickname Aki while in MLB. His nickname is Gan-chan in NPB.

== Early and personal life ==
Iwamura was born on February 9, 1979, in Uwajima, Japan, in Ehime Prefecture. He attended Uwajima Higashi High School. He played in the Philippines on the Japan National high school baseball team.

His older brother, Takashi Iwamura, was also a professional baseball player who spent two seasons in the Kintetsu Buffaloes' farm system. Both were drafted in 1997.

On July 10, 2007, Iwamura's wife Misaki gave birth to their first son, Taiki.

== Career ==
=== Tokyo Yakult Swallows ===
Iwamura was a third baseman for the Tokyo Yakult Swallows in the Japanese Central League.

He played in the Central League from 1998 to 2006 and won six Golden Glove awards at third base. He also hit 106 home runs in his last three seasons in the Central League, including 32 (with a .311 batting average) in 2006. His best season was 2004, when he hit 44 home runs with 103 RBI and a .300 batting average. In that same season, he also set the Central League record for strikeouts with 173. Munetaka Murakami broke Iwamura's strikeout record in 2019.

=== Tampa Bay Devil Rays / Rays ===
During the 2006 offseason, Iwamura opted to be posted for Major League Baseball (MLB). The posts were due to the MLB commissioner on November 10, 2006; the highest bidder would be granted the right to negotiate a contract with Iwamura. Incidentally, Daisuke Matsuzaka, who signed a six-year, $52 million contract with the Boston Red Sox that same year, is a close friend of Iwamura.

On November 14, information leaked that the highest bidder and consequently the team that won the right to negotiate with Iwamura was the Tampa Bay Devil Rays. MLB announced the next day that the Rays had made the winning bid; the Rays reportedly bid $4.5 million. Iwamura was the second player that the Rays had been able to obtain through the posting system; in 2005, they won the rights to negotiate with pitcher Shinji Mori, though Mori ended up never playing a game with the Rays due to him tearing his labrum in 2006 spring training.

On December 15, 2006, Iwamura signed a three-year contract with the Rays worth $7.7 million, with a club option for a fourth year at $4.25 million.

==== 2007 season ====
With his defensive position still undecided, Iwamura brought gloves for five different positions to his first year of spring training in the major leagues. However, he eventually won the starting third base job, despite the competition, and began his major league career at his natural position for the Devil Rays. Iwamura did not hit well in spring training but seemed to adjust quickly to major league pitching once the 2007 season began, hitting .339 in April. However, he was hit in the eye on a freak play while chasing down a fly ball and spent time on the disabled list until May 28.

Iwamura's bat cooled off somewhat when he returned. He finished his rookie campaign with a .285 batting average, 7 home runs, 34 RBI and 82 runs scored while serving mostly as the Devil Rays' leadoff hitter.

Iwamura's glove is made out of crocodile skin, a rarity in the major leagues (although some players wear gloves made out of kangaroo hide). Likewise, his bat, made by the North American sportswear company Nike with a distinct design.

On September 1, 2007, in a game against the New York Yankees, Iwamura had his bat confiscated in the second inning. The Yankees questioned the flatness of the end of Iwamura's bat. The bat was sent to the commissioner's office for inspection, where it was found to be acceptable for use. It was later returned to Iwamura.

==== 2008 season ====
With Evan Longoria, a third base prospect for the Rays, rising quickly through the team's minor league system, Iwamura was moved to second base for the beginning of the 2008 season. The transition went extremely well, as he and Jason Bartlett, a shortstop that the Rays had newly acquired from the Minnesota Twins, quickly became one of the best double play combinations in baseball, helping the Rays to their best season in franchise history.

Again batting leadoff, Iwamura struggled at the plate in April, hitting just above .200 for much of the month. However, his batting improved significantly in May and June, when he was among the league leaders in hits. In Game 7 of the American League Championship Series, Iwamura fielded Jed Lowrie's ground ball and stepped on second base himself, making the last out and allowing the Rays to advance to their first World Series in franchise history, which they lost in five games to the Philadelphia Phillies. In September 2023 the Rays, to honor this landmark moment in the team’s history, unveiled a statue outside of Tropicana Field depicting Iwamura after recording the out.

===== Incidents at second base =====
During a March 12, 2008 spring training game against the New York Yankees, Yankees first baseman Shelley Duncan slid into Iwamura's right thigh with his spikes high off the ground. Duncan was immediately ejected from the game and a bench-clearing brawl ensued. When the dust settled, two players (Jonny Gomes from the Tampa Bay Rays and Shelley Duncan from the New York Yankees) and two coaches (third base coach Bobby Meacham and hitting coach Kevin Long from the New York Yankees) were ejected.

On June 4 at Fenway Park in Boston, Massachusetts, Boston Red Sox outfielder Coco Crisp tried to steal second base. Tampa Bay Rays shortstop Jason Bartlett caught the throw from the catcher, kneeling down in the process. In doing so, Bartlett's left leg blocked the base as Crisp slid head first into him. The collision caused an injury to Crisp's thumb. Later in the game, Crisp reached base and again made an attempt to steal second base. This time, Iwamura received the throw, and Crisp slid hard into Iwamura feet first. In a postgame interview, Crisp stated that he slid into Iwamura because he felt that Bartlett's earlier actions were not appropriate. The next day the two teams played again, and in the second inning, Tampa Bay Rays starting pitcher James Shields threw a pitch to Crisp which hit him below the waist. Crisp charged the mound and the benches emptied. Iwamura, though he was not ejected from the game, was suspended for three games for his role in the fight. He appealed the suspension, but it was upheld.

===== The "rayhawk" =====
Midway through the 2008 season, Iwamura got a mohawk haircut, a style which soon spread to many of his teammates and then Rays' manager Joe Maddon. As the team went on to become American League Champions, many fans around the area also sported the "Rayhawk", which usually involved a wide and short patch of hair running from front to back atop an otherwise bald or closely shorn head.

==== 2009 season ====
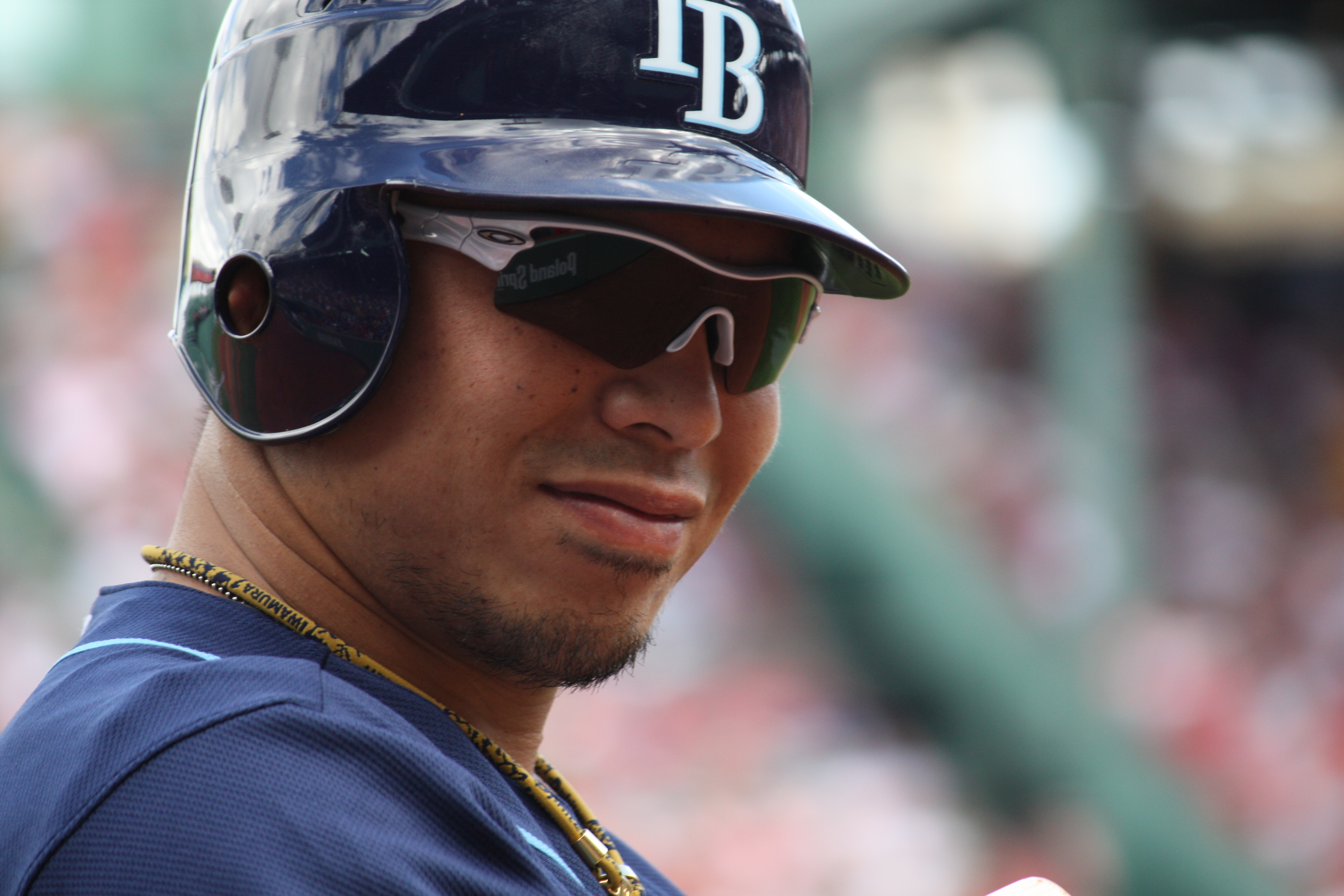
Iwamura at Fenway Park in September 2009

Iwamura was replaced at the top of the batting order by B. J. Upton but continued to have one of the best batting averages among American League 2nd basemen while batting lower in the order (usually in the 8th spot).

On May 24, Iwamura was injured while attempting to turn a double play against the Florida Marlins. After being slid into by Marlins infielder Chris Coghlan, Iwamura fell to the ground and eventually had to be carted off the field. Initial reports suggested this was a serious injury, and the following day it was announced that Iwamura suffered a torn ACL that would require surgery, "involvement" on the MCL, in addition to torn ligaments in his ankle, causing him to miss the remainder of the season. Iwamura underwent surgery one month later on June 22 to repair the injury, and it was discovered that the ACL was only partially torn, meaning that he did not require reconstructive surgery. Instead, an arthroscopic surgery was performed, and a report on the successful surgery stated that he could return to action in 6–8 weeks.

After several minor league rehab appearances, Iwamura returned to the Rays' starting lineup on August 29 on the road against the Detroit Tigers, batting 9th in the batting order and playing his usual position of 2nd base. He made an immediate impact, scoring two runs in his first game back and hitting his first home run of the season the following day.

=== Pittsburgh Pirates ===
Iwamura was traded to the Pittsburgh Pirates for pitcher Jesse Chavez following the 2009 season.

Iwamura was designated for assignment by the Pirates on June 16, 2010 after hitting only .182 in Pittsburgh and showing limited range at second base. After failing to work out a suitable trade, Iwamura joined the Pirates' Triple-A affiliate, the Indianapolis Indians, on June 22, 2010. He was designated for assignment on September 6 and released on September 8.

=== Oakland Athletics ===
On September 13, 2010, Iwamura signed with the Oakland Athletics. He played in 10 games for Oakland, batting .129 with four RBI in his final MLB action. On October 4, the Athletics released Iwamura.

=== Tohoku Rakuten Golden Eagles ===
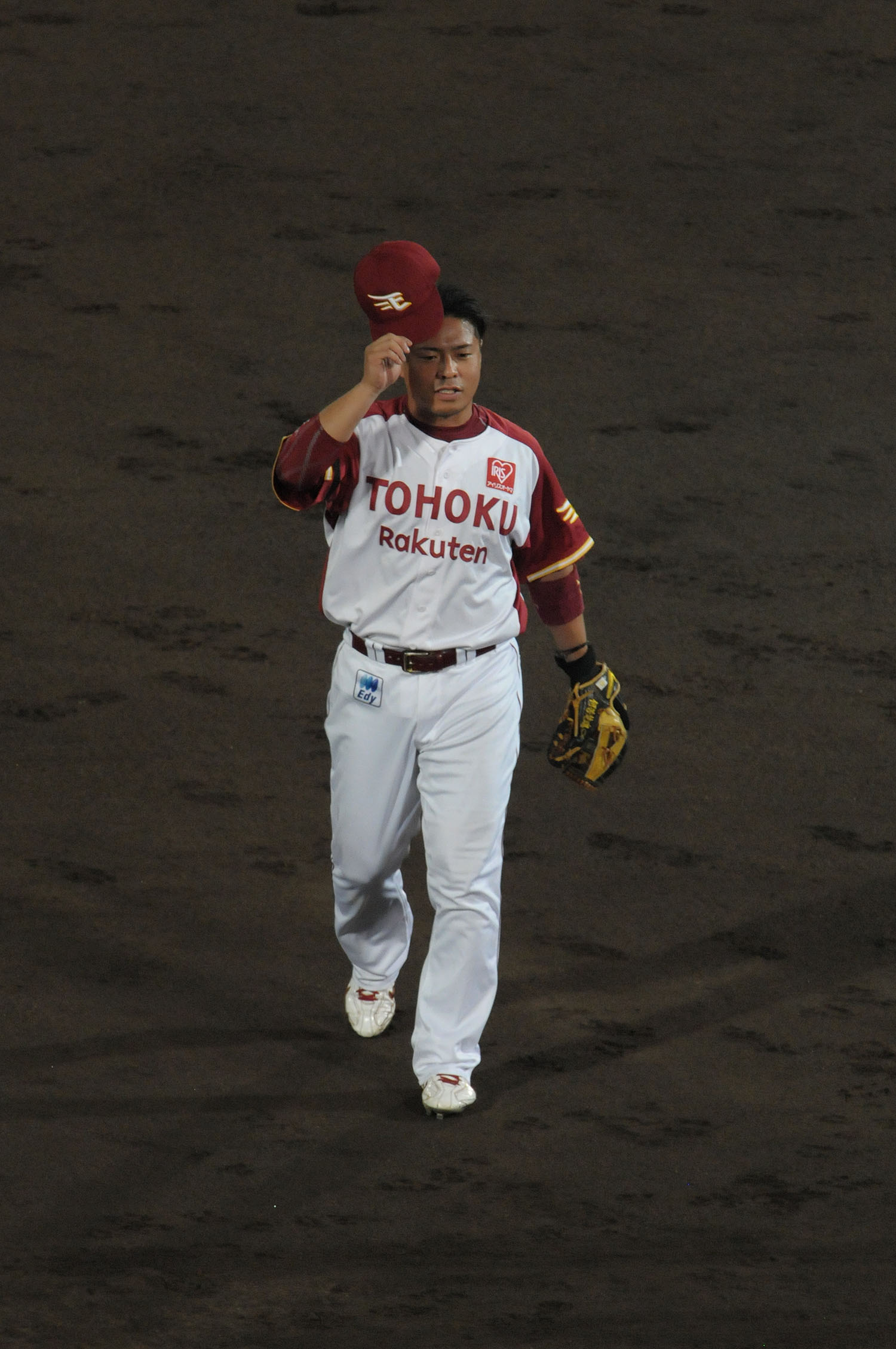
Iwamura with the Tohoku Rakuten Golden Eagles

Iwamura signed with the Tohoku Rakuten Golden Eagles on November 16, 2010. He was expected to bat in the cleanup position for his new team; however, he experienced injuries and had a bad slump during his 2 years with the Golden Eagles. He was released from the Eagles during the 2012 off-season.

=== Second stint with the Swallows ===
Iwamura signed with the Tokyo Yakult Swallows on December 10, 2012.

=== Fukushima Hopes ===
Iwamura signed with the Fukushima Hopes of the Route Inn BC League for the 2016 season.

== International career ==
He was selected Japan national baseball team at the 1999 Intercontinental Cup, 2006 World Baseball Classic and 2009 World Baseball Classic. During the 2006 World Baseball Classic when South Korea beat Japan 2-1 and South Korean players planted a South Korean flag on the pitcher's mound on March 15, Iwamura expressed his opinions by saying "What do they have to do that for?"

== Awards ==
- Six-time Golden Glove winner (2000–2002, 2004–2006)
- Three-time NPB All-Star (2001, 2004, 2005)
- Two-time Best Nine (2002, 2006)
- Monthly MVP (August 2004)
- Japan Series Valuable Player (2001)
