= Robert Teasdale =

Baseball player

Robert Teasdale (born 31 October 1933) was a baseball player at the 1956 Summer Olympics.
