= Run differential =

Baseball statistic

In baseball, run differential is a cumulative team statistic that combines offensive and defensive scoring. Run differential is calculated by subtracting runs allowed from runs scored.

Run differential is positive when a team scores more runs than it allows; it is negative when a team allows more runs than it scores. Non-zero run differentials are normally expressed with leading plus and minus signs.

== Example ==
The final standings, along with runs scored (RS), runs allowed (RA), and run differential (RD), of the American League West for the 1999 season were as follows:

1999 AL West (final standings)
Team	Won	Lost	Win pct.	GB	RS	RA	RD
Texas Rangers	95	67	.586	–	945	859	+86
Oakland Athletics	87	75	.537	8	893	846	+47
Seattle Mariners	79	83	.488	16	859	905	-46
Anaheim Angels	70	92	.432	25	711	826	-115

Note: the run differentials shown above are not zero sum as the four teams within the AL West did not exclusively play against one another; there were 14 total teams in the American League in 1999.

== Usage ==
Run differentials may be used by some leagues or in some tournaments as a tiebreaker. An example is baseball at the Summer Olympics, where if teams in pool play finish with identical records, run differential is used to determine which team advances to the knockout stage. The 1956 Claxton Shield tournament Australia included an instance of a team attempting to manipulate the run differential in order to advance.

Major League Baseball (MLB) does not use run differential in breaking ties for postseason berths, although standings presented on the MLB.com website may include run differential as a courtesy to the reader.

Run differential has a strong correlation to a team's winning percentage, which is characterized by a formula known as the Pythagorean expectation, devised by Bill James.

=== Team Quality Balance ===
A variation on the run differential formula is the Team Quality Balance (TQB) formula, defined by the World Baseball Softball Confederation (WBSC) for use in certain tie-breaking scenarios. It is calculated as runs scored per innings played on offense minus runs allowed per innings played on defense. TQB functions the same as run differential except that it also factors in the number of innings played on offense and defense, which is not always the same. For example, when a home team is winning after 8 1/2 innings have been played, the bottom of the ninth inning is not played; in such cases, the home team has played eight innings on offense and nine on defense, while the away team has played nine innings on offense and eight on defense. WBSC tournaments, including the World Baseball Classic, also use a mercy rule, which can end a game after five or seven innings.

== Records ==
The best run differential in a major-league season is +458, set by the 1884 St Louis Maroons, who scored 887 runs while allowing 429. The Maroons competed in the Union Association, whose records and statistics are recognized by MLB. The worst run differential was by the 1899 Cleveland Spiders of the National League at −723, who allowed 1252 runs while only scoring 529. In baseball's modern era (since 1900), the 1939 New York Yankees have recorded the best run differential (+411), while the 2025 Colorado Rockies have recorded the worst (−424).

The highest run differential in a single game in major-league history is 29, when the Chicago Colts (now the Cubs) beat the Louisville Colonels 36–7 on June 29, 1897, and the record in baseball's modern era (since 1900) is 27, when the Texas Rangers beat the Baltimore Orioles 30–3 on August 22, 2007. The biggest run differential in a shutout is 22, when the Cleveland Indians defeated the Yankees 22–0 on August 31, 2004.

== See also ==
- Goal difference, used in football (soccer) and some other sports
- Net run rate, used in cricket
- Runs Per Wicket Ratio, used in cricket
