= 1958 USC Trojans baseball team =

American college baseball season

1958 USC Trojans baseball

College World Series champions Pacific Coast Conference champions
- Conference: Pacific Coast Conference
- Record: 28–3 (14–2 PCC)
- Head coach: Rod Dedeaux (17th year)
- Home stadium: Bovard Field

1958 Pacific Coast Conference baseball standings
	Conf.				Overall
Team	W		L	PCT	W		L	PCT
North Division
Oregon State ‍†‍‍	10	–	4	.714	18	–	11	.621
Washington State ‍‍‍	9	–	5	.643	19	–	11	.633
Oregon ‍‍‍	9	–	5	.643		–		–
Idaho ‍‍‍	4	–	11	.267		–		–
Washington ‍‍‍	3	–	10	.231	12	–	13	.480
California Intercollegiate Baseball Association
Southern California ‍†‍‍^{y}	14	–	2	.875	29	–	3	.906
California ‍‍‍	9	–	7	.563	19	–	12	.613
Stanford ‍‍‍	7	–	9	.438	23	–	12	.657
Santa Clara ‍‍‍	5	–	11	.313		–		–
UCLA ‍‍‍	5	–	11	.313	15	–	19	.441
† – Conference champion y – Invited to the NCAA tournament

The 1958 USC Trojans baseball team represented the University of Southern California in the 1958 NCAA University Division baseball season. The team was coached by Rod Dedeaux in his 17th season.

The Trojans won the College World Series, defeating the Missouri Tigers in the championship game.

== Roster ==
1958 USC Trojans roster
Pitchers: Jim Barudoni; Bob Blakeslee; Joe Camperi; Jim Conroy; Tony DeCarbo; Bruce Gardner; Pat Gillick; Hal Jeffs; Bill Thom; Catchers: John Christiansen; Bill Heath; Frank McDermott; Bob Santich	Infielders: Bob Allen; Don Biasotti; Mike Blewett; Gary Boone; Mike Castanon; Julius Guccione; Ken Guffey Miller; Don Mullane; Bob Peccole; Fred Scott; Al Waxman; John Werhas	Outfielders: Ben Breskovich; Don Buford; Ron Fairly; Jim Hanna; Rex Johnston; Jerry Siegert; Ron Silverman; Dave Stephenson; Rocky Tarchione; Coaches: Rod Dedeaux

== Schedule ==
1958 USC Trojans baseball game log
Regular season
March

Date	Opponent	Score	Overall record	PCC record
March 18	Cal Poly	10–0	1–0	–
March 28	Santa Clara	7–3	2–0	1–0
March 29	Santa Clara	21–5	3–0	2–0

April

Date	Opponent	Score	Overall record	PCC record
April 11	at California	4–2	4–0	3–0
April 12	at Stanford	10–5	5–0	4–0
April 12	at Stanford	13–4	6–0	5–0
April 19	California	5–7	6–1	5–1
April 19	California	10–5	7–1	6–1
April 25	at Saint Mary's	13–4	8–1	–
April 29	Loyola	8–2	9–1	–

May

Date	Opponent	Score	Overall record	PCC record
May 2	at UCLA	3–0	10–1	7–1
May 3	UCLA	21–2	11–1	8–1
May 6	Pepperdine	16–2	12–1	–
May 9	Stanford	19–13	13–1	9–1
May 10	Stanford	9–2	14–1	10–1
May 13	Whittier	5–4	15–1	–
May 16	at California	6–7	15–2	10–2
May 17	at Santa Clara	12–11	16–2	11–2
May 17	at Santa Clara	5–4	17–2	12–2
May 23	UCLA	23–1	18–2	13–2
May 24	at UCLA	15–1	19–2	14–2

Post-season
Pacific Coast Conference Playoff

Date	Opponent	Score	Overall record
May 30	Oregon State	7–0	20–2
May 31	Oregon State	15–0	21–2

NCAA tournament: District 8 playoffs

Date	Opponent	Score	Overall record
June 6	vs. Portland	6–0	22–2
June 7	vs. Portland	11–1	23–2

NCAA tournament: College World Series

Date	Opponent	Site/stadium	Score	Overall record
June 14	vs. Holy Cross	Rosenblatt Stadium	0–3	23–3
June 15	vs. Arizona	Rosenblatt Stadium	4–0	24–3
June 16	vs. Northern Colorado	Rosenblatt Stadium	12–1	25–3
June 17	vs. Holy Cross	Rosenblatt Stadium	6–2	26–3
June 18	vs. Missouri	Rosenblatt Stadium	7–0	27–3
June 19	vs. Missouri	Rosenblatt Stadium	8–7	28–3

== Awards and honors ==
Mike Castanon

- All-American Second Team
- College World Series All-Tournament Team
- All-PCC First Team

Ron Fairly

- College World Series All-Tournament Team
- All-PCC First Team

Ken Guffey Miller

- All-American 1959
- All-PCC First Team 1957, 1958 and 1959

Fred Scott

- All-PCC First Team
- College World Series All-Tournament Team

Jerry Siegert

- All-America First Team

Bill Thom

- College World Series Most Outstanding Player
- All-PCC First Team
