= 1958 Western Michigan Broncos baseball team =

American college baseball season

1958 Western Michigan Broncos baseball

Mid-American Conference champions District IV champions

College World Series, T-3rd
- Conference: Mid-American Conference
- Record: 23–8–1 (10–0 MAC)
- Head coach: Charlie Maher (20th season)
- Assistant coach: Don Edwards
- Home stadium: Hyames Field

1958 Mid-American Conference baseball standings
	Conf.						Overall
Team	W		L		T	PCT	W		L		T	PCT
Western Michigan ‍†‍‍^{y}	10	–	0	–	0	1.000	23	–	8	–	1	.734
Ohio ‍‍‍	8	–	1	–	0	.889	17	–	4	–	0	.810
Bowling Green ‍‍‍	4	–	5	–	0	.444	7	–	7	–	0	.500
Kent State ‍‍‍	4	–	7	–	0	.364	12	–	10	–	0	.545
Toledo ‍‍‍	4	–	8	–	0	.333	6	–	13	–	0	.316
Marshall ‍‍‍	4	–	8	–	0	.333	8	–	10	–	0	.444
Miami (OH) ‍‍‍	2	–	7	–	0	.222	7	–	10	–	0	.412
† – Conference champion y – Invited to the NCAA tournament As of June 30, 1958

The 1958 Western Michigan Broncos baseball team represented Western Michigan University in the 1958 NCAA University Division baseball season. The Broncos played their home games at Hyames Field. The team was coached by Charlie Maher in his 20th year at Western Michigan.

The Broncos won the District IV playoff to advanced to the College World Series, where they were defeated by the Missouri Tigers.

== Roster ==
1958 Western Michigan Broncos baseball team
Players
Coaches

#	Pos.	Name	B/T	Height	Weight	Year	Home town
		Phil Bareis	/	—	—
		Jerrt Belanger	/	—	—
		Bill Blackwell	/	—	—
		Larry Buchanan	/	—	—
		Dick Churches	/	—	—
		Len Grabowski	/	—	—
		Jim Greenwood	/	—	—
		Joe Gresser	/	—	—
		Ed Gustafson	/	—	—
		Jim Hedberg	/	—	—
		Jim Hock	/	—	—
		Norm Hradek	/	—	—
		Frank Karwoski	/	—	—
		Jess Kuaffman	/	—	—
		Jack Krueger	/	—	—
		Terry Mack	/	—	—
		Bob Mason	/	—	—
		Craig Morris	/	—	—
		Art Morrissey	/	—	—
		Jim Phillips	/	—	—
		George Pratt	/	—	—
		Larry Randall	/	—	—
	RHP	Jack Rumohr	/R	—	—
		John Shelonder	/	—	—
		Dick Sosnowski	/	—	—
		Jim Stainoff	/	—	—
		Bill Topp	/	—	—
		Jerry Watkowski	/	—	—
		Ron White	/	—	—
		Marv Winegar	/	—	—
		Lyle Witham	/	—	—
		Tom Wood	/	—	—
		Jack Zaski	/	—	—

Head coach

Charlie Maher

Assistant coach(es)

Don Edwards

Legend

- (C) Team captain
- (S) Suspended
- (I) Ineligible
- Injured
- Current redshirt

== Schedule ==
1958 Western Michigan Broncos baseball game log
Regular season
April (9–3–1)

#	Date	Opponent	Site/stadium	Score	Overall record	MAC record
1	April 4	at Indiana	Sembower Field • Bloomington, Indiana	1–4	0–1	–
2	April 4	at Indiana	Sembower Field • Bloomington, Indiana	6–3	1–1	–
3	April 5	at Indiana	Sembower Field • Bloomington, Indiana	12–3	2–1	–
4	April 5	at Indiana	Sembower Field • Bloomington, Indiana	5–7	2–2	–
5	April 8	at Indiana	Sembower Field • Bloomington, Indiana	19–2	3–2	–
6	April 8	at Indiana	Sembower Field • Bloomington, Indiana	11–4	4–2	–
7	April 15	at Michigan	Ray Fisher Stadium • Ann Arbor, Michigan	2–7	4–3	–
8	April 18	Marshall	Hyames Field • Kalamazoo, Michigan	7–4	5–3	1–0
9	April 19	Marshall	Hyames Field • Kalamazoo, Michigan	6–3	6–3	2–0
10	April 21	at Iowa	Unknown • Iowa City, Iowa	7–7	6–3–1	2–0
11	April 25	Bowling Green	Hyames Field • Kalamazoo, Michigan	3–2	7–3–1	3–0
12	April 26	Bowling Green	Hyames Field • Kalamazoo, Michigan	3–1	8–3–1	4–0
13	April 30	Michigan State	Hyames Field • Kalamazoo, Michigan	7–5	9–3–1	4–0

May (6–1)

#	Date	Opponent	Site/stadium	Score	Overall record	MAC record
14	May 2	Toledo	Hyames Field • Kalamazoo, Michigan	8–1	10–3–1	5–0
15	May 3	Toledo	Hyames Field • Kalamazoo, Michigan	6–0	11–3–1	6–0
16	May 9	at Miami (OH)	Unknown • Oxford, Ohio	7–0	12–3–1	7–0
17	May 10	at Miami (OH)	Unknown • Oxford, Ohio	6–3	13–3–1	8–0
18	May 13	Michigan	Hyames Field • Kalamazoo, Michigan	6–8	13–4–1	8–0
19	May 16	at Kent State	Unknown • Kent, Ohio	5–2	14–4–1	9–0
20	May 17	at Kent State	Unknown • Kent, Ohio	6–2	15–4–1	10–0
21	May 19	Wisconsin	Hyames Field • Kalamazoo, Michigan	3–7	15–5–1	10–0
22	May 20	Wisconsin	Hyames Field • Kalamazoo, Michigan	2–23	15–6–1	10–0
23	May 23	Notre Dame	Hyames Field • Kalamazoo, Michigan	2–1	16–6–1	10–0

Postseason
District IV Playoff (3–0)

#	Date	Opponent	Site/stadium	Score	Overall record	MAC record
24	May 28	Minnesota	Hyames Field • Kalamazoo, Michigan	4–0	17–6–1	10–0
25	May 29	Valparaiso	Hyames Field • Kalamazoo, Michigan	24–2	18–6–1	10–0
26	May 30	Notre Dame	Hyames Field • Kalamazoo, Michigan	5–4	19–6–1	10–0

May/June (2–0)

#	Date	Opponent	Site/stadium	Score	Overall record	MAC record
27	May 31	Notre Dame	Hyames Field • Kalamazoo, Michigan	5–2	20–6–1	10–0
28	June 7	at Michigan State	Old College Field • East Lansing, Michigan	5–4	21–6–1	10–0

College World Series (2–2)

#	Date	Opponent	Site/stadium	Score	Overall record	MAC record
29	June 13	vs Missouri	Omaha Municipal Stadium • Omaha, Nebraska	1–3	21–7–1	10–0
30	June 15	vs Lafayette	Omaha Municipal Stadium • Omaha, Nebraska	4–3	22–7–1	10–0
31	June 16	vs Clemson	Omaha Municipal Stadium • Omaha, Nebraska	5–3	23–7–1	10–0
32	June 17	vs Missouri	Omaha Municipal Stadium • Omaha, Nebraska	1–3	23–8–1	10–0

== Awards and honors ==
Bob Mason

- First Team All-MAC

Dick Sosnowski

- First Team All-MAC

Marv Winegar

- First Team All-MAC
