= Adrian Meagher =

Australian baseball player

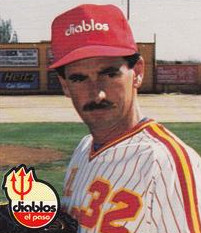
- Meagher with the El Paso Diablos c. 1988
- Infielder
- Born: 2 April 1959 (age 65); Lismore, New South Wales, Australia
- Bats: Unknown Throws: Right
Medals
Men's baseball
Representing Australia
Intercontinental Cup
Gold medal – first place	1999 Sydney	Team

Adrian T. Meagher (born 2 April 1959), is an Australian baseball player. He competed at the 2000 Summer Olympics.
