= 1958 NCAA University Division baseball season =

Baseball season

NCAA tournament

College World Series
- Champions: USC (2nd title)
- Runners-up: Missouri (3rd CWS Appearance)
- Winning coach: Rod Dedeaux (2nd title)
- MOP: Bill Thom (USC)

Seasons
- ← 1957 1959 →

The 1958 NCAA University Division baseball season, play of college baseball in the United States organized by the National Collegiate Athletic Association (NCAA) began in the spring of 1958. The season progressed through the regular season and concluded with the 1958 College World Series. The College World Series, held for the twelfth time in 1958, consisted of one team from each of eight geographical districts and was held in Omaha, Nebraska at Johnny Rosenblatt Stadium as a double-elimination tournament. Southern California claimed the championship.

== Realignment ==
Prior to the 1958 season, Oklahoma A&M, now Oklahoma State, rejoined the Big Seven Conference, which then became known as the Big Eight.

== Conference winners ==
This is a partial list of conference champions from the 1958 season. Each of the eight geographical districts chose, by various methods, the team that would represent them in the NCAA tournament. 13 teams earned automatic bids by winning their conference championship while 14 teams earned at-large selections.

Conference	Regular season winner	Tournament	Tournament Champion
Atlantic Coast Conference	Clemson/North Carolina	1958 Atlantic Coast Conference Baseball Playoffs	Clemson
Big Eight Conference	Missouri	No Tournament	
Big Ten Conference	Minnesota	No Tournament	
CIBA	Southern California	No Tournament	
EIBL	Harvard	No Tournament	
Mid-American Conference	Western Michigan	No Tournament	
Pacific Coast Conference	Oregon State	No Tournament	
Southeastern Conference	Auburn	No Tournament	
Southern Conference	George Washington/Richmond	No Tournament	
Southwest Conference	Texas	No Tournament	
Yankee Conference	Connecticut	No Tournament	

== Conference standings ==
The following is an incomplete list of conference standings:

1958 Atlantic Coast Conference baseball standings
	Conf.				Overall
Team	W		L	PCT	W		L	PCT
Clemson ‍†‍‡‍^{y}	11	–	3	.786	22	–	8	.733
North Carolina ‍†‍‍	11	–	3	.786	19	–	8	.704
Duke ‍‍‍	7	–	5	.583	9	–	11	.450
Wake Forest ‍‍‍	7	–	6	.538	12	–	9	.571
NC State ‍‍‍	6	–	7	.462	10	–	7	.588
Virginia ‍‍‍	4	–	9	.308	5	–	15	.250
Maryland ‍‍‍	4	–	10	.286	7	–	11	.389
South Carolina ‍‍‍	3	–	10	.231	7	–	14	.333
† – Conference champion ‡ – Playoff champion y – Invited to the NCAA tournament As of June 30, 1958; Rankings from Collegiate Baseball

1958 Big Eight Conference baseball standings
	Conf.				Overall
Team	W		L	PCT	W		L	PCT
Missouri ‍†‍‍^{y}	12	–	3	.800	21	–	7	.750
Oklahoma State ‍‍‍	13	–	5	.722	17	–	6	.739
Oklahoma ‍‍‍	11	–	5	.688	12	–	8	.600
Kansas ‍‍‍	11	–	6	.647	14	–	8	.636
Nebraska ‍‍‍	12	–	9	.571	17	–	10	.630
Iowa State ‍‍‍	8	–	12	.400	8	–	15	.348
Colorado ‍‍‍	5	–	16	.238	7	–	19	.269
Kansas State ‍‍‍	2	–	18	.100	2	–	18	.100
† – Conference champion y – Invited to the NCAA tournament

1958 Eastern Intercollegiate Baseball League baseball standings
	Conf.						Overall
Team	W		L		T	PCT	W		L		T	PCT
Harvard ‍†‍‍	7	–	0	–	0	1.000	14	–	8	–	1	.630
Dartmouth ‍‍‍^{y}	6	–	2	–	0	.750	12	–	6	–	0	.667
Penn ‍‍‍	6	–	2	–	0	.750	15	–	7	–	0	.682
Cornell ‍‍‍	4	–	3	–	0	.571	8	–	4	–	0	.667
Navy ‍‍‍	4	–	3	–	0	.571	11	–	7	–	0	.611
Yale ‍‍‍	4	–	5	–	0	.444	11	–	13	–	0	.458
Princeton ‍‍‍	3	–	5	–	0	.375	8	–	12	–	1	.405
Army ‍‍‍	3	–	6	–	0	.333	10	–	11	–	1	.477
Brown ‍‍‍	1	–	7	–	0	.125	4	–	8	–	0	.333
Columbia ‍‍‍	1	–	7	–	0	.125	4	–	10	–	1	.300
† – Conference champion y – Invited to the NCAA tournament

1958 Mid-American Conference baseball standings
	Conf.						Overall
Team	W		L		T	PCT	W		L		T	PCT
Western Michigan ‍†‍‍^{y}	10	–	0	–	0	1.000	23	–	8	–	1	.734
Ohio ‍‍‍	8	–	1	–	0	.889	17	–	4	–	0	.810
Bowling Green ‍‍‍	4	–	5	–	0	.444	7	–	7	–	0	.500
Kent State ‍‍‍	4	–	7	–	0	.364	12	–	10	–	0	.545
Toledo ‍‍‍	4	–	8	–	0	.333	6	–	13	–	0	.316
Marshall ‍‍‍	4	–	8	–	0	.333	8	–	10	–	0	.444
Miami (OH) ‍‍‍	2	–	7	–	0	.222	7	–	10	–	0	.412
† – Conference champion y – Invited to the NCAA tournament As of June 30, 1958

1958 Pacific Coast Conference baseball standings
	Conf.				Overall
Team	W		L	PCT	W		L	PCT
North Division
Oregon State ‍†‍‍	10	–	4	.714	18	–	11	.621
Washington State ‍‍‍	9	–	5	.643	19	–	11	.633
Oregon ‍‍‍	9	–	5	.643		–		–
Idaho ‍‍‍	4	–	11	.267		–		–
Washington ‍‍‍	3	–	10	.231	12	–	13	.480
California Intercollegiate Baseball Association
Southern California ‍†‍‍^{y}	14	–	2	.875	29	–	3	.906
California ‍‍‍	9	–	7	.563	19	–	12	.613
Stanford ‍‍‍	7	–	9	.438	23	–	12	.657
Santa Clara ‍‍‍	5	–	11	.313		–		–
UCLA ‍‍‍	5	–	11	.313	15	–	19	.441
† – Conference champion y – Invited to the NCAA tournament

== College World Series ==
The 1958 season marked the twelfth NCAA Baseball Tournament, which culminated with the eight team College World Series. The College World Series was held in Omaha, Nebraska. The eight teams played a double-elimination format, with Southern California claiming their second championship with an 8–7 win over Missouri in the final.

Upper round 1
Missouri	3
Western Michigan	1
Colorado State College	10
Lafayette	5
Holy Cross	3
Southern California	0
Arizona	1
Clemson	4

Upper round 2
Missouri	11
Colorado State College	2
Holy Cross	17
Clemson	4
Lower round 1
Western Michigan	4^{10}
Lafayette	3
Southern California	4
Arizona	0

Upper final
Missouri	4
Holy Cross	1
Lower round 2
Clemson	3
Western Michigan	5
Southern California	12
Colorado State College	1

Semifinals
Missouri	3
Western Michigan	1
Holy Cross	2
Southern California	6

Final
Missouri	0	7
Southern California	7	8^{12}
