= 1950 Claxton Shield =

1950 Claxton Shield Champions

New South Wales
5th title

The 1950 Claxton Shield was the 11th annual Claxton Shield; it was held in Sydney, New South Wales. The participants were South Australia, New South Wales, Victoria, Western Australia and Queensland. The series was won by New South Wales, their fifth Shield title.

The quality of the competition received a lift as many American servicemen married and settled down in Australia. The Australian Baseball Council was criticised by the New South Wales board for not allowing two interstate players from competing in the Shield, one of which being Graeme Hole (test cricketer) from South Australia and the other being Queensland state cricketer Alan Smith. Both were top-ranking pitchers, but were knocked back due to them not having their six-month residential qualifications.

Queensland secured its first Claxton Shield win on 30 July when they defeated Western Australia 2–1 in a 15-inning game played. At that time, it was the longest Shield game in history and was played in front of 10,000 spectators who braved the rainy July weather.
