= 1958 NCAA University Division baseball tournament =

American college sports championship

- Season: 1958
- Teams: 26
- Finals site: Johnny Rosenblatt Stadium; Omaha, NE
- Champions: Southern California (2nd title)
- Runner-up: Missouri (2nd CWS Appearance)
- Winning coach: Rod Dedeaux (2nd title)
- MOP: Bill Thom (Southern California)

The 1958 NCAA University Division baseball tournament was played at the end of the 1958 NCAA University Division baseball season to determine the national champion of college baseball. The tournament concluded with eight teams competing in the College World Series, a double-elimination tournament in its twelfth year. Eight regional districts sent representatives to the College World Series with preliminary rounds within each district serving to determine each representative. These events would later become known as regionals. Each district had its own format for selecting teams, resulting in 26 teams participating in the tournament at the conclusion of their regular season, and in some cases, after a conference tournament. The College World Series was held in Omaha, NE from June 13 to June 19. The twelfth tournament's champion was Southern California, coached by Rod Dedeaux. The Most Outstanding Player was Bill Thom of Southern California.

== Tournament ==
=== District 1 ===
Semifinals
Connecticut	1	10	–
Dartmouth	0	0	–
Holy Cross	4	5	–
Colby	3	1	–

Finals
Connecticut	1^{10}
Holy Cross	2

=== District 2 ===
Semifinals
NYU	2
Villanova	1
Lafayette	9
Penn State	1

Finals
NYU	1
Lafayette	5

=== District 3 ===
Upper round 1
Florida State	3
George Washington	1
Florida	8
Clemson	6
Lower round 1
George Washington	2
Clemson	4

Upper final
Florida State	1
Florida	2
Lower final
Florida State	5^{10}
Clemson	8

Final
Florida	14	1
Clemson	15	3

=== District 4 ===
Upper round 1
Valparaiso	2
Notre Dame	0
Western Michigan	4
Minnesota	0
Lower round 1
Notre Dame	11
Minnesota	7

Upper final
Valparaiso	2
Western Michigan	24
Lower final
Valparaiso	4
Notre Dame	10

Final
Western Michigan	5	—
Notre Dame	4	—

=== District 5 ===
Finals
Missouri	11	13	—
Northern Iowa	7	3	—

=== District 6 ===
Semifinal		Final
		Texas	14	4	2
Texas	3^{10}	Arizona	3	16	5
Houston	2

=== District 7 ===
Finals
BYU	4	0	9
Colorado State College	3	8	5

Brigham Young University withdrew from district. Colorado State College was selected as District 7 representative in the College World Series.

=== District 8 ===
Semifinals				Finals
Portland	2	3	3
Occidental	5	0	0
Occidental	5	0	0	Portland	0	1	—
				Southern California	6	11	—

== College World Series ==
=== Participants ===
School	Conference	Record (conference)	Head coach	CWS appearances	CWS best finish	CWS record
Arizona	Border	37–12 (7–1)	Frank Sancet	3 (last: 1956)	2nd (1956)	7–6
Clemson	ACC	21–6 (12–3)	Bill Wilhelm	0 (last: none)	none	0–0
Colorado State College (Note: Colorado State College is currently known as the University of Northern Colorado. Not to be confused with Colorado State University, then known as Colorado A&M.) (Note: BYU withdrew from district. Northern Colorado was selected as District 7 representative.)	RMC	20–8	Pete Butler	4 (last: 1957)	5th (1955)	1–8
Holy Cross	Independent	16–4	Jack Barry	1 (last: 1952)	1st (1952)	6–1
Lafayette	Independent	19–8	Charlie Gelbert	2 (last: 1954)	3rd (1953)	3–4
Missouri	Big 8	17–5 (12–3)	Hi Simmons	2 (last: 1954)	1st (1954)	8–3
USC	CIBA	24–2 (14–2)	Rod Dedeaux	4 (last: 1955)	1st (1948)	5–7
Western Michigan	MAC	21–6–1 (10–0)	Charlie Maher	2 (last: 1955)	2nd (1955)	5–4

=== Brackets ===
Upper round 1
Missouri	3
Western Michigan	1
Colorado State College	10
Lafayette	5
Holy Cross	3
Southern California	0
Arizona	1
Clemson	4

Upper round 2
Missouri	11
Colorado State College	2
Holy Cross	17
Clemson	4
Lower round 1
Western Michigan	4^{10}
Lafayette	3
Southern California	4
Arizona	0

Upper final
Missouri	4
Holy Cross	1
Lower round 2
Clemson	3
Western Michigan	5
Southern California	12
Colorado State College	1

Semifinals
Missouri	3
Western Michigan	1
Holy Cross	2
Southern California	6

Final
Missouri	0	7
Southern California	7	8^{12}

==== Game results ====
Date	Game	Winner	Score	Loser	Notes
June 13	Game 1	Missouri	3–1	Western Michigan	
June 14	Game 2	Colorado State College	10–5	Lafayette	
June 14	Game 3	Holy Cross	3–0	Southern California	
June 14	Game 4	Clemson	4–1	Arizona	
June 15	Game 5	Western Michigan	4–3 (10 innings)	Lafayette	Lafayette eliminated
June 15	Game 6	USC	4–0	Arizona	Arizona eliminated
June 15	Game 7	Missouri	11–2	Colorado State College	
June 15	Game 8	Holy Cross	17–4	Clemson	
June 16	Game 9	Western Michigan	5–3	Clemson	Clemson eliminated
June 16	Game 10	Southern California	12–1	Colorado State College	Colorado State College eliminated
June 16	Game 11	Missouri	4–1	Holy Cross	
June 17	Game 12	Southern California	6–2	Holy Cross	Holy Cross eliminated
June 17	Game 13	Missouri	3–1	Western Michigan	Western Michigan eliminated
June 18	Game 14	Southern California	7–0	Missouri	
June 19	Final	Southern California	8–7 (12 innings)	Missouri	Southern California wins CWS

=== All-Tournament Team ===
The following players were members of the All-Tournament Team.

Position	Player	School
P	Doug Gulick	Missouri
P	Bill Thom (MOP)	USC
C	Hank Kuhlmann	Missouri
1B	Sonny Siebert	Missouri
2B	Mike Castanon	USC
3B	Ken Komodzinski	Holy Cross
SS	Fred Scott	USC
OF	Ron Fairly	USC
OF	Martin Toft	Missouri
OF	Marvin Winegar	Western Michigan

=== Notable players ===
- Missouri: Hank Kuhlmann, Sonny Siebert
- Southern California: Don Buford, Ron Fairly, Pat Gillick, Bill Thom

=== Quick facts ===
- In 1996, Rod Dedeaux of USC was named to the College World Series All-Time Team (1947–95) by the Oklahoma World-Herald as part of the 50th CWS celebration; 1958 marked the first of his 10 titles as sole head coach, after having won the 1948 CWS as co-coach with Sam Barry.
- In 1971, Ron Fairly (OF) of USC was named to the College World Series All-Time Team (1947–70) by the blue-ribbon committee chaired by Abe Chanin as part of the 25th CWS celebration.
- In 1996, Alan Hall (C) of Arizona and Ken Komodzinski (3B) of Holy Cross were named to the 1940s-50s All-Decade Team by a panel of 60 voters representing CWS head coaches, media, and chairs of the Division I Baseball Committee.
- USC's Robert Blakeslee pitched a two-hitter against Northern Colorado.
- 25,931 fans watched the CWS (10 sessions).
- The championship game was umpired by Bob Stewart, Vinnie Smith, Jerry Carlton, and George Hametz.
- The following records were tied:
  - Most Sacrifice Bunts, Individual, Single Game - 3, Paul Chamberlain, vs Lafayette, W 10–5, tied
  - Most Triples, Individual, CWS - 3, Sonny Siebert, Missouri, 6 games, tied (2 others)
  - Most Errors, Individual, Championship Game - 3, Gary Starr, Missouri, vs USC, L 8-7 (12), tied (2 others)
  - Most Runs, One Inning, Team, Championship Game - 7, USC, vs Missouri, 4th inning, W 8-7 (12), tied
  - Most Errors, Team, Championship Game - 6, Missouri, vs USC, L 8-7 (12), tied
  - Most Errors, Both Teams, Championship Game - 8, Missouri (6) vs USC (2), USC 8-7 (12), tied (2 others)
  - Largest Margin Overcome for Victory, Championship Game - 4, USC, vs Missouri, W 8-7 (12), tied

== See also ==
- 1958 NCAA College Division baseball tournament
- 1958 NAIA World Series
