= 1956 Claxton Shield =

- 1956

Tournament information
- Date: 28 July – 4 August
- Host(s): (South Australia) Adelaide, SA
- Teams: 4
- Defending champions: New South Wales

Final positions
- Champion: Victoria (5th title)
- 1st runner-up: Western Australia
- 2nd runner-up: South Australia

The 1956 Claxton Shield was the 17th annual Claxton Shield, it was held in Adelaide, South Australia. The participants were South Australia, New South Wales, Victoria and Western Australia. The series was won by Victoria in due to a controversial decision in the final game. They claimed their fifth Shield title. The 1956 Olympic Baseball team was selected from the tournament.

== Controversy ==
The final game of the Shield erupted in controversy when South Australia played Victoria. Victoria stood with a 3–0 record, Western Australia with a 2–1 as well as South Australia. If South Australia won against Victoria in the final game, the winner would be determined on run differential.

The game was tied 4–4 at the end and went to extra innings, with South Australia making the break through, going ahead 5–4 going into the bottom of the 12th inning. The South Australian team realised that a one-run win would not be enough to win the series and needed to score more runs, therefore they had to allow Victoria to score so they could chance a bigger win in the 13th inning. With a Victorian runner on third base the pitcher attempted a pickoff, deliberately throwing the ball away. The umpire called a dead ball and sent the runner back to third. The next pitch, the South Australian pitcher deliberately balked, which would have allowed the run to score, but the home plate umpire called the game over and gave the game to Victoria as a 9–0 forfeit on the basis that South Australia brought the game into disrepute.

Appeals by the South Australian team to the Australian Baseball Corporation were denied, so the championship was awarded to Victoria.
