= Max Lord (baseball) =

Australian baseball player (1925–2019)

Maxwell George Lord (26 February 1925 – 2 June 2019) was a baseball player at the 1956 Melbourne Olympics.
