= Bill Thom =

- Pitcher
- Born: August 15, 1937 (age 88); Los Angeles, California, U.S.
- Bats: Right Throws: Right

Member of the National College

Baseball Hall of Fame
- Induction: 2024

William Charles Thom (born August 15, 1937) was an American pitcher who is most notable for winning the 1958 College World Series Most Outstanding Player award while a junior at University of Southern California. He is one of seven players from University of Southern California to win that award. The others are: Bud Hollowell, Bill Seinsoth, Russ McQueen, George Milke, Rod Boxberger and Wes Rachels

He was also an All-American in 1959.

Considered one of the finest pitchers in USC history, he won 10 games and posted a 1.44 ERA in 1959. He won 23 games in his Trojan career.

He played professional from 1959 to 1962, never reaching the big leagues. Overall, he went 32–19 in his professional career.

In 2001, he was inducted into the USC Sports Hall of Fame.

His son, Bill Thom, Jr., played for USC in 1992 and 1993.
