= 1958 Missouri Tigers baseball team =

American college baseball season

1958 Missouri Tigers baseball

College World Series Runner-up Big Eight Conference champions
- Conference: Big Eight Conference
- Record: 22–7 (12–3 Big Eight)
- Head coach: Hi Simmons (20th year)

1958 Big Eight Conference baseball standings
	Conf.				Overall
Team	W		L	PCT	W		L	PCT
Missouri ‍†‍‍^{y}	12	–	3	.800	21	–	7	.750
Oklahoma State ‍‍‍	13	–	5	.722	17	–	6	.739
Oklahoma ‍‍‍	11	–	5	.688	12	–	8	.600
Kansas ‍‍‍	11	–	6	.647	14	–	8	.636
Nebraska ‍‍‍	12	–	9	.571	17	–	10	.630
Iowa State ‍‍‍	8	–	12	.400	8	–	15	.348
Colorado ‍‍‍	5	–	16	.238	7	–	19	.269
Kansas State ‍‍‍	2	–	18	.100	2	–	18	.100
† – Conference champion y – Invited to the NCAA tournament

The 1958 Missouri Tigers baseball team represented the University of Missouri in the 1958 NCAA University Division baseball season. The Tigers played their home games at Rollins Field. The team was coached by Hi Simmons in his 20th season at Missouri.

Led by All-Americans Sonny Siebert, Bo Toft and Ray Uriarte, the Tigers advanced to the 1958 College World Series, where they lost to Southern California in the championship game.

== Roster ==
1958 Missouri Tigers
Roster
Doug Gulick; Bob Haas; Bud Harbin; Ralph Hochgrebe; Hank Kuhlman; Claude Lewis; Steve Lewis; Larry Luecke	Bob Meyers; Ernie Nevers; John O'Donoghue; Sonny Siebert; Gary Starr; Paul Stehr; Bo Toft; Ray Uriarte

== Schedule ==
1958 Missouri Tigers baseball game log

Regular season
Opponent	Score	Overall record	Big Eight record
Ole Miss	12–6	1–0	–
Ole Miss	14–5	2–0	–
Arkansas State	13–0	3–0	–
Arkansas State	2–3	3–1	–
Nebraska	3–6	3–2	0-1
Nebraska	9–6	4–2	1-1
Nebraska	12–5	5–2	2-1
Washington University	4–5	5–3	–
Kansas	25–14	6–3	3-1
Kansas State	24–2	7–3	4-1
Kansas State	5–0	8–3	5-1
Kansas State	3–6	8–4	5-2
Oklahoma	5–4	9–4	6-2
Washington University	12–3	10–4	–
Iowa State	8–6	11–4	7-2
Iowa State	7–8	11–5	7-3
Iowa State	11–0	12–5	8-3
Colorado	17–8	13–5	9-3
Colorado	9–3	14–5	10-3
Colorado	8–3	15–5	11-3
Oklahoma State	14–4	16–5	12-3

Postseason

NCAA tournament: Division V Playoff
Opponent	Score	Overall record
Iowa State Teachers	11–7	17–5
Iowa State Teachers	13–3	18–5

NCAA tournament: College World Series
Date	Opponent	Site/stadium	Score	Overall record
June 13	vs. Western Michigan	Rosenblatt Stadium	3–1	19–5
June 15	vs. Colorado State	Rosenblatt Stadium	11–2	20–5
June 16	vs. Holy Cross	Rosenblatt Stadium	4–1	21–5
June 17	vs. Western Michigan	Rosenblatt Stadium	3–1	22–5
June 18	vs. Southern California	Rosenblatt Stadium	0–7	22–6
June 19	vs. Southern California	Rosenblatt Stadium	7–8	22–7

== Awards and honors ==
Ernie Nevers

- First Team All Big Eight

Sonny Siebert

- Third Team All-American
- All District V
- First Team All Big Eight

Bo Toft

- Second Team All-American
- All District V
- First Team All Big Eight

Ray Uriarte

- First Team All-American
- All District V
- First Team All Big Eight
