= Colin Payne (baseball) =

Baseball player

Colin Payne (1930 – 31 March 2005) was a baseball player at the 1956 Summer Olympics.
