= Barry Wappett =

Australian baseball player (1935–2022)

Barry Wappett (24 January 1935 – 18 June 2022) was a baseball player at the 1956 Melbourne Olympics. On club level he was associated with the Marist Brothers Baseball Club of Lismore on the NSW north coast.
