= 1962 NCAA University Division baseball rankings =

1962 NCAA University Division baseball season

NCAA tournament
- Duration: May 29–June 16, 1962

College World Series
- Champions: Michigan (2nd title)
- Runners-up: Santa Clara (1st CWS Appearance)
- Winning Coach: Don Lund (1st title)
- MOP: Bob Garibaldi (Santa Clara)

Seasons
- ← 1961 1963 →

The following poll makes up the 1962 NCAA University Division baseball rankings. Collegiate Baseball Newspaper published its first human poll of the top 20 teams in college baseball in 1957, and expanded to rank the top 30 teams in 1961.

== Collegiate Baseball ==
Currently, only the final poll from the 1962 season is available.

Rank	Team
1	Michigan
2	Santa Clara
3	Texas
4	Florida State
5	Ithaca
6	Holy Cross
7	Missouri
8	Northern Colorado
9	Fresno State
10	Western Michigan
11	Illinois
12	Wake Forest
13	Florida
14	Mississippi State
15	Oregon State
16	Detroit
17	St. John's
18	Texas A&M
19	Arizona
20	West Virginia
21	Cal Poly Pomona
22	Cal State Los Angeles
23	USC
24	Navy
25	Army
26	Arizona State
27	Auburn
28	Gettysburg
29	Vermont
30	Harvard
