= 1962 College Baseball All-America Team =

This is a list of college baseball players named first team All-Americans for the 1962 NCAA University Division baseball season. From 1947 to 1963, the American Baseball Coaches Association was the only generally recognized All-America selector, so any player selected by the ABCA is considered a "consensus" All-American.

== Key ==
A	American Baseball Coaches Association
	Member of the National College Baseball Hall of Fame
	Consensus All-American – selected the ABCA

== All-Americans ==
Position	Name	School	#	A
Pitcher	Tom Fletcher	Illinois	1	✓
Pitcher	Dan Schneider	Arizona	1	✓
Catcher	Buddy Teagle	Florida State	1	✓
First baseman	Tom Brown	Maryland	1	✓
Second baseman	Pat Rigby	Texas	1	✓
Shortstop	Ernie Fazio	Santa Clara	1	✓
Third baseman	Tom Moore	Florida	1	✓
Outfielder	Archie Moore	Springfield	1	✓
Outfielder	Larry Nichols	Auburn	1	✓
Outfielder	Larry Thomas	Ohio	1	✓

== See also ==
- List of college baseball awards
