= 1962 Colorado State College Bears baseball team =

American college baseball season

1962 Colorado State College Bears baseball

Rocky Mountain Conference champions District VII champions

College World Series, T-7th
- Conference: Rocky Mountain Conference
- Record: 22–11 (10–2 RMC)
- Head coach: Pete Butler (20th season)
- Assistant coach: Best (1st season)
- Home stadium: Jackson Field

The 1962 Colorado State College Bears baseball team represented Colorado State College in the 1962 NCAA University Division baseball season. The Bears played their home games at Jackson Field. The team was coached by Pete Butler in his 20th year at Colorado State.

The Bears won the District VII playoff to advanced to the College World Series, where they were defeated by the Texas Longhorns.

== Roster ==
1962 Colorado State College Bears baseball team
Players
Coaches

#	Pos.	Name	B/T	Height	Weight	Year	Home town
		John Barnes	/	—	—
	OF	Ron Bettinger	/	—	—
		Joe Bonequista	/	—	—
		Tom Carlson	/	—	—
	RHP	Chuck Chamberlain	/R	—	—
		Dexter Cramer	/	—	—
	P	Ed Dyer	/	—	—
	INF	Ron Faulkner	/L	—	—
	INF	Gary Harper	/R	—	—
		Mike Henwood	/	—	—
	RHP	Bill Jewell	/	—	—
		Mike Kelly	/	—	—
		Rich Krenning	/	—	—
	C	Jim Lochner	/R	—	—
	INF	Jack Miyamoto	/R	—	—
	RHP	Pat Pine	/	—	—
		Gary Salimeno	/	—	—
		Larry Shin	/	—	—
		Kim Spence	/	—	—
	INF	Al Suydum	/R	—	—
		Charles Williams	/	—	—
25	RHP	Jay Woodward	/R	—	—
	OF	Julie Yearling	L/	—	—

Head coach

Pete Butler

Assistant coach(es)

Best

Legend

- (C) Team captain
- (S) Suspended
- (I) Ineligible
- Injured
- Current redshirt

== Schedule ==
1962 Colorado State College Bears baseball game log
Regular season
March (2–5)

#	Date	Opponent	Site/stadium	Score	Overall record	RMC record
1	March 14	at New Mexico	Lobo Field • Albuquerque, New Mexico	12–6	1–0	–
2	March 16	at Arizona	UA Field • Tucson, Arizona	5–11	1–1	–
3	March 17	at Arizona	UA Field • Tucson, Arizona	8–14	1–2	–
4	March 17	at Arizona	UA Field • Tucson, Arizona	2–4	1–3	–
5	March 20	at New Mexico	Lobo Field • Albuquerque, New Mexico	15–11	2–3	–
6	March 21	at New Mexico	Lobo Field • Albuquerque, New Mexico	7–9	2–4	–
7	March 28	Colorado State	Jackson Field • Greeley, Colorado	1–3	2–5	4–0

April (7–3)

#	Date	Opponent	Site/stadium	Score	Overall record	RMC record
8	April 4	Colorado Mines	Jackson Field • Greeley, Colorado	13–0	3–5	–
9	April 6	Western State	Jackson Field • Greeley, Colorado	13–2	4–5	1–0
10	April 11	Colorado Mines	Jackson Field • Greeley, Colorado	11–5	5–5	2–0
11	April 13	at Colorado Mines	Unknown • Golden, Colorado	11–0	6–5	3–0
12	April 20	Wyoming	Jackson Field • Greeley, Colorado	5–13	6–6	3–0
13	April 21	at Wyoming	Unknown • Laramie, Wyoming	2–5	6–7	3–0
14	April 22	Western State	Jackson Field • Greeley, Colorado	3–6	6–8	3–1
15	April 24	Colorado State	Jackson Field • Greeley, Colorado	7–2	7–8	3–1
16	April 27	at Western State	Unknown • Gunnison, Colorado	21–6	8–8	4–1
17	April 28	at Western State	Unknown • Gunnison, Colorado	10–3	9–8	5–1

May (10–1)

#	Date	Opponent	Site/stadium	Score	Overall record	RMC record
18	May 4	at Adams State	Unknown • Alamosa, Colorado	13–2	10–8	6–1
19	May 5	at Adams State	Unknown • Alamosa, Colorado	8–2	11–8	7–1
20	May 8	at Denver	Unknown • Denver, Colorado	11–5	12–8	7–1
21	May 9	Air Force	Jackson Field • Greeley, Colorado	6–2	13–8	7–1
22	May 10	at Colorado College	Stewart Field • Colorado Springs, Colorado	16–15	14–8	8–1
23	May 12	Colorado College	Jackson Field • Greeley, Colorado	15–3	15–8	9–1
24	May 15	at Colorado State	Unknown • Fort Collins, Colorado	5–4	16–8	9–1
25	May 18	Adams State	Jackson Field • Greeley, Colorado	6–10	16–9	9–2
26	May 19	Adams State	Jackson Field • Greeley, Colorado	9–3	17–9	10–2
27	May 22	Denver	Jackson Field • Greeley, Colorado	10–3	18–9	10–2
28	May 26	at Air Force	Falcon Baseball Field • Colorado Springs, Colorado	5–3	19–9	10–2

Postseason
District VII Playoff (3–0)

#	Date	Opponent	Site/stadium	Score	Overall record	RMC record
29	June 1	Air Force	Jackson Field • Greeley, Colorado	7–2	20–9	10–2
30	June 2	New Mexico	Jackson Field • Greeley, Colorado	11–2	21–9	10–2
31	June 4	Air Force	Jackson Field • Greeley, Colorado	6–5	22–9	10–2

College World Series (0–2)

#	Date	Opponent	Site/stadium	Score	Overall record	RMC record
32	June 11	vs Holy Cross	Omaha Municipal Stadium • Omaha, Nebraska	3–4	22–10	10–2
33	June 12	vs Texas	Omaha Municipal Stadium • Omaha, Nebraska	2–12	22–11	10–2

== Awards and honors ==
Ron Bettinger

- All-Rocky Mountain Conference Team

Eddie Dyer

- All-Rocky Mountain Conference Team

Gary Harper

- All-Rocky Mountain Conference Team

Jim Lochner

- All-Rocky Mountain Conference Team

Al Suydam

- All-Rocky Mountain Conference Team

Julie Yearling

- All-Rocky Mountain Conference Team
