= 1962 NCAA University Division baseball tournament =

American college sports championship

- Season: 1962
- Teams: 27
- Finals site: Johnny Rosenblatt Stadium; Omaha, NE
- Champions: Michigan (2nd title)
- Runner-up: Santa Clara (1st CWS Appearance)
- Winning coach: Don Lund (1st title)
- MOP: Bob Garibaldi (Santa Clara)

The 1962 NCAA University Division baseball tournament was played at the end of the 1962 NCAA University Division baseball season to determine the national champion of college baseball. The tournament concluded with eight teams competing in the College World Series, a double-elimination tournament in its sixteenth year. Eight regional districts sent representatives to the College World Series with preliminary rounds within each district serving to determine each representative. These events would later become known as regionals. Each district had its own format for selecting teams, resulting in 27 teams participating in the tournament at the conclusion of their regular season, and in some cases, after a conference tournament. The College World Series was held in Omaha, NE from June 11 to June 16. The sixteenth tournament's champion was Michigan, coached by Don Lund. The Most Outstanding Player was Bob Garibaldi of runner-up Santa Clara.

== Regionals ==
The opening rounds of the tournament were played across eight district sites across the country, each consisting of a field of two to four teams. Each district tournament, except District 2, was double-elimination. The winners of each district advanced to the College World Series.

Bold indicates winner. * indicates extra innings.

=== District 1 at Springfield, MA ===
Quarterfinals
**Holy Cross**	**7**
Vermont	5
**Bridgeport**	**4**
Boston College	3
Lower round 1
**Vermont**	**3**
Boston College	2

Semifinals
**Holy Cross**	**5**
Bridgeport	2
Lower final
Bridgeport	4^{13}
**Vermont**	**5**

Final
**Holy Cross**	**12**	—
Vermont	5	—

=== District 2 at University Park, PA ===
Semifinals
**Ithaca**	**7**
Penn State	6
**Gettysburg**	**7**
St. John's	5

Finals
**Ithaca**	**7**
Gettysburg	4

=== District 3 at Gastonia, NC ===
Quarterfinals
**Wake Forest**	**8**
West Virginia	3
**Florida**	**1**
Florida State	0
Lower round 1
West Virginia	5
**Florida State**	**6**

Semifinals
**Wake Forest**	**7**
Florida	1
Lower final
Florida	1
**Florida State**	**3**^{5}

Final
Wake Forest	8	2
**Florida State**	**10**	**3**^{11}

=== District 4 at Kalamazoo, MI ===
Quarterfinals
**Illinois**	**2**
Detroit	1
**Western Michigan**	**6**^{10}
Michigan	5
Lower round 1
Detroit	6
**Michigan**	**12**

Semifinals
Illinois	2
**Western Michigan**	**10**
Lower final
Illinois	1
**Michigan**	**5**

Final
Western Michigan	2	6
**Michigan**	**3**^{10}	**7**^{10}

=== District 5 at Columbia, MO ===
Finals
Bradley	1	4	—
**Missouri**	**3**	**9**	—

=== District 6 at Tucson, AZ ===
Finals
**Texas**	**1**	**7**	—
Arizona	0	4	—

=== District 7 at Greeley, CO ===
Quarterfinals
**New Mexico**	**9**
BYU	2
**Colorado State College**	**7**
Air Force	2
Lower round 1
BYU	2
**Air Force**	**4**

Semifinals
New Mexico	2
**Colorado State College**	**11**
Lower final
New Mexico	1
**Air Force**	**2**

Final
**Colorado State College**	**6**^{11}	—
Air Force	5	—

Note: Colorado State College of Education became Northern Colorado University in 1970.

=== District 8 at Santa Clara, CA ===
Semifinal				Final
				Oregon State	1	5	—
Fresno State	1	**3**	2	**Santa Clara**	**8**	**7**	—
**Santa Clara**	**6**	1	**4**

== College World Series ==
=== Participants ===
School	Conference	Record (conference)	Head coach	CWS appearances	CWS best finish	CWS record
Colorado State College (Note: Colorado State College of Education became the University of Northern Colorado in 1970. Colorado State University in Fort Collins was known as Colorado A&M until 1957.)	RMC	22–9 (10–2)	Pete Butler	8 (last: 1961)	5th (1955)	2–16
Florida State	Independent	21–12	Danny Litwhiler	1 (last: 1957)	7th (1957)	0–2
Holy Cross	Independent	20–3	Albert Riopel	2 (last: 1958)	1st (1952)	8–3
Ithaca	Independent	17–0	Bucky Freeman	0 (last: none)	none	0–0
Michigan	Big 10	27–12 (12–3)	Don Lund	1 (last: 1953)	1st (1953)	4–1
Missouri	Big 8	22–3 (16–5)	Hi Simmons	3 (last: 1958)	1st (1954)	12–5
Santa Clara	CIBA	35–6 (12–4)	Paddy Cottrell	0 (last: none)	none	0-0
Texas	SWC	19–5 (12–2)	Bibb Falk	6 (last: 1961)	1st (1949, 1950)	14–9

=== Results ===
==== Bracket ====
Upper round 1
Holy Cross	4
Colorado State College	3
Michigan	3
Texas	1
Ithaca	5
Missouri	1
Florida State	5
Santa Clara	1

Upper round 2
Michigan	11
Holy Cross	4
Florida State	5
Ithaca	4
Lower round 1
Texas	12
Colorado State College	2
Santa Clara	7^{12}
Missouri	4

Upper final
Michigan	10
Florida State	7
Lower round 2
Ithaca	2
Texas	3
Holy Cross	7
Santa Clara	12

Semifinals
Santa Clara	11
Florida State	6
Michigan	0
Texas	7

Preliminary final
Santa Clara	4^{10}
Texas	3

Final
Michigan	5^{15}
Santa Clara	4

==== Game results ====
Date	Game	Winner	Score	Loser	Notes
June 11	Game 1	Holy Cross	4–3	Colorado State College	
June 11	Game 2	Michigan	3–1	Texas	
June 11	Game 3	Ithaca	5–1	Missouri	
June 11	Game 4	Florida State	5–1	Santa Clara	
June 12	Game 5	Texas	12–2	Colorado State College	Colorado State College eliminated
June 12	Game 6	Santa Clara	7–4 (12 innings)	Missouri	Missouri eliminated
June 12	Game 7	Michigan	11–4	Holy Cross	
June 12	Game 8	Florida State	5–4	Ithaca	
June 13	Game 9	Santa Clara	12–7	Holy Cross	Holy Cross eliminated
June 13	Game 10	Texas	3–2	Ithaca	Ithaca eliminated
June 13	Game 11	Michigan	10–7	Florida State	
June 14	Game 12	Santa Clara	11–6	Florida State	Florida State eliminated
June 14	Game 13	Texas	7–0	Michigan	
June 15	Game 14	Santa Clara	4–3 (10 innings)	Texas	Texas eliminated
June 16	Final	Michigan	5–4 (15 innings)	Santa Clara	Michigan wins CWS

=== All-Tournament Team ===
The following players were members of the All-Tournament Team.

Position	Player	School
P	Tom Belcher	Texas
P	Bob Garibaldi (MOP)	Santa Clara
C	Joe Merullo	Michigan
1B	Dave Campbell	Michigan
2B	Pat Rigby	Texas
3B	Harvey Chapman	Michigan
SS	Ernie Fazio	Santa Clara
OF	Ken Flanagan	Santa Clara
OF	Mickey McDermott	Santa Clara
OF	Ron Tate	Michigan

=== Notable players ===
- Colorado State College:
- Florida State: Woody Woodward
- Holy Cross: Dick Joyce, John Peterman
- Ithaca:
- Michigan: Dave Campbell, Fritz Fisher
- Missouri: Byron Browne, John Sevcik
- Santa Clara: John Boccabella, Nelson Briles, Tim Cullen, Ernie Fazio, Bob Garibaldi, Larry Loughlin, Pete Magrini
- Texas: Bill Bethea, Chuck Hartenstein

== See also ==
- 1962 NAIA World Series
