= Pete Butler (coach) =

American coach and college athletics administrator

Biographical details
- Born: 1909
- Died: January 26, 1983

Playing career

Baseball
- 1930–1931: Colorado State Teachers

Coaching career (HC unless noted)

Football
- 1940–?: Colorado State Teachers (assistant)

Basketball
- 1940–1943: Colorado State Teachers
- 1945–1956: Colorado State Teachers

Baseball
- 1941–1967: Colorado State Teachers

Administrative career (AD unless noted)
- 1934–1940: New Mexico Mines

Head coaching record
- Overall: 151–133 (basketball); 417–153–2 (baseball)

Accomplishments and honors

Championships
- Baseball; 25 RMC (1941–1942, 1945–1967)

Louis C. "Pete" Butler (1909 – January 26, 1983) was an American football, basketball, and baseball coach and college athletics administrator. He served as the head baseball coach at Colorado State College of Education—now known as the University of Northern Colorado—from 1941 to 1967, compiling a record of 416–154–2. Butler was also the school's head basketball coach from 1940 to 1943 and again from 1945 to 1956, tally mark of 151–133. His baseball teams won 25 consecutive Rocky Mountain Athletic Conference championships.

== Head coaching record ==
=== Baseball ===
Record table
Season	Team	Overall	Conference	Standing	Postseason
Colorado State Bears (Rocky Mountain Conference) (1941–1967)
1941	Colorado State	7–6	–	1st	
1942	Colorado State	9–1	–	1st	
1945	Colorado State	–	–	1st	
1946	Colorado State	4–0	–	1st	
1947	Colorado State	6–2	–	1st	
1948	Colorado State	14–4	8–0	1st	
1949	Colorado State	17–2	8–0	1st	Region D Playoff
1950	Colorado State	15–8	6–2	1st	Region VII Playoff
1951	Colorado State	12–5–1	7–1	1st	
1952	Colorado State	15–9	9–1	1st	College World Series
1953	Colorado State	15–6	9–1	1st	College World Series
1954	Colorado State	17–7	9–1	1st	Region VII Playoff
1955	Colorado State	25–4	10–0	1st	College World Series
1956	Colorado State	21–5	10–0	1st	Region VII Playoff
1957	Colorado State	24–8	–	1st	College World Series
1958	Colorado State College	20–10	–	1st	College World Series
1959	Colorado State College	24–7	10–1	1st	College World Series
1960	Colorado State College	23–9	15–1	1st	College World Series
1961	Colorado State College	28–8	10–0	1st	College World Series
1962	Colorado State College	22–11	10–2	1st	College World Series
1963	Colorado State College	21–8	12–0	1st	District VII Playoff
1964	Colorado State College	20–7–1	16–0	1st	District VII Playoff
1965	Colorado State College	21–10	11–0	1st	District VII Playoff
1966	Colorado State College	20–7	13–1	1st	District VII Playoff
1967	Colorado State College	17–9	10–2	1st	District VII Playoff
Colorado State College:		417–153–2	183–13		
Total:		417–153–2			
National champion Postseason invitational champion Conference regular season champion Conference regular season and conference tournament champion Division regular season champion Division regular season and conference tournament champion Conference tournament champion
