= 1962 Michigan Wolverines baseball team =

Sports team

1962 Michigan Wolverines baseball

National champions
- Conference: Big Ten Conference
- CB: No. 1
- Record: 31–13 (12–3 Big Ten)
- Head coach: Don Lund (4th year)
- Home stadium: Ferry Field

1962 Big Ten Conference baseball standings
	Conf.						Overall
Team	W		L		T	PCT	W		L		T	PCT
No. 11 Illinois ‍†‍‍^{y}	13	–	2	–	0	.867	25	–	6	–	0	.806
No. 1 Michigan ‍‍‍^{y}	12	–	3	–	0	.800	31	–	13	–	0	.705
Ohio State ‍‍‍	9	–	5	–	0	.643	19	–	4	–	0	.826
Michigan State ‍‍‍	6	–	6	–	0	.500	17	–	13	–	0	.567
Wisconsin ‍‍‍	6	–	6	–	0	.500	14	–	9	–	0	.609
Indiana ‍‍‍	6	–	8	–	0	.429	16	–	13	–	0	.552
Iowa ‍‍‍	5	–	9	–	0	.357	13	–	16	–	1	.450
Northwestern ‍‍‍	5	–	9	–	0	.357	11	–	6	–	0	.647
Purdue ‍‍‍	4	–	11	–	0	.267	14	–	14	–	1	.500
Minnesota ‍‍‍	3	–	10	–	0	.231	14	–	16	–	0	.467
† – Conference champion y – Invited to the NCAA tournament As of June 30, 1962; Rankings from Collegiate Baseball

The 1962 Michigan Wolverines baseball team represented the University of Michigan in the 1962 NCAA University Division baseball season. The Wolverines played their home games at Ferry Field. The team was coached by Don Lund in his 4th season at Michigan.

The Wolverines won the College World Series, defeating the Santa Clara Broncos in the championship game.

== Roster ==
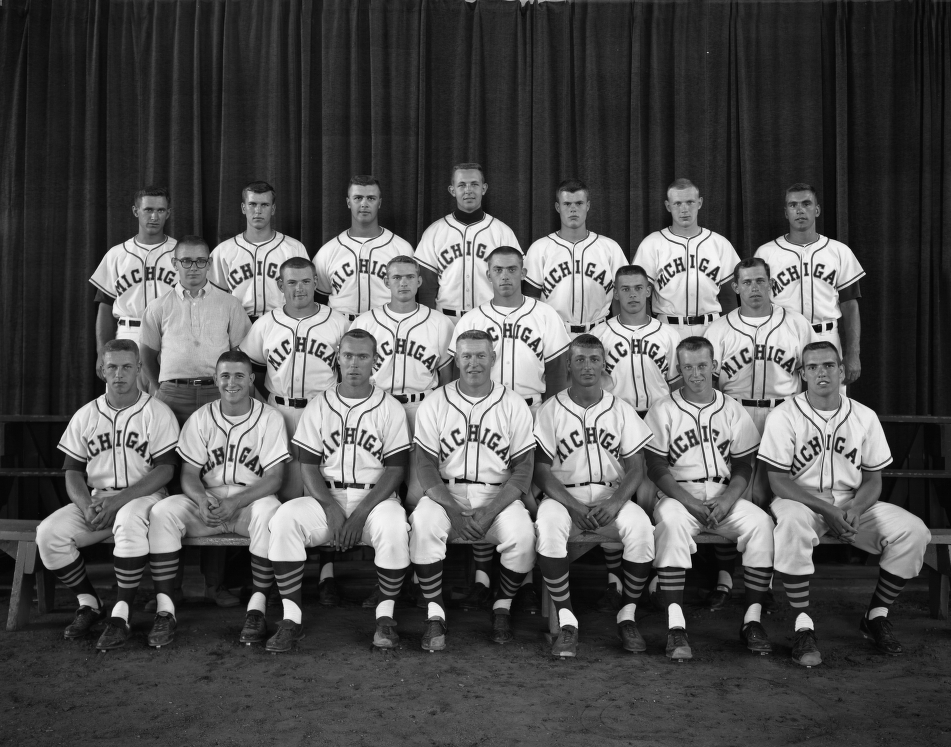

Front Row: Dennis Spalla, Dick Honig, John Kerr, Don Lund (head coach), Joe Merullo, Wayne Slusher, Dave Roebuck
Second Row: Bruce Kropschot (manager), Dick Post, Joe Jones, Ron Tate, Jim Newman, Milbry Benedict (assistant coach)
Back Row: Jim Steckley, Jim Bobel, Ron Lauterbach, Bob Dunston, Dave Campbell, Fritz Fisher, Harvey Chapman

== Schedule ==
Legend
	Michigan win
	Michigan loss
*	Non-Conference game

1962 Michigan Wolverines baseball game log
Regular season

April
Date	Opponent	Score	Overall record	Big Ten Record
April 6	Arizona*	L 1–2	0–1	
April 7	Arizona*	L 3–9	0–2	
April 7	Arizona*	L 2–6	0–3	
April 9	Arizona State*	L 6–14	0–4	
April 10	Arizona State*	W 6–3	1–4	
April 11	Arizona State*	L 6–7	1–5	
April 12	Arizona State*	W 18–7	2–5	
April 13	Arizona State*	W 4–3	3–5	
April 14	Arizona State*	L 4–8	3–6	
April 14	Arizona State*	W 9–7	4–6	
April 17	Wayne State*	W 4–3	5–6	
April 20	Illinois	L 0–1	5–7	0–1
April 21	Purdue	W 12–4	6–7	1–1
April 21	Purdue	W 8-2	7-7	2–1
April 24	Central Michigan*	W 5–2	8–7	
April 25	Notre Dame*	W 18–7	9–7	
April 27	Iowa	W 9–6	10–7	3–1
April 28	Minnesota	W 8–3	11–7	4–1
April 28	Minnesota	W 3–2	12–7	5–1
April 30	Detroit*	L 1–5	12–8	

May
Date	Opponent	Score	Overall record	Big Ten Record
May 4	Michigan State	W 16–3	13–8	6–1
May 4	Michigan State	W 4–0	14–8	7–1
May 4	Michigan State	W 14–1	15–8	8–1
May 11	Indiana	W 5–4	16–8	9–1
May 12	Ohio State	W 5–4	17–8	10–1
May 12	Ohio State	W 12–2	18–8	11–1
May 15	Detroit*	L 0–2	18–9	
May 18	Northwestern	W 3–2	19–9	12–1
May 19	Wisconsin	L 3–6	19–10	12–2
May 19	Wisconsin	W 5–6	19–11	12–3
May 21	Wayne State*	W 10–7	20–11	
May 25	Western Michigan*	W 9–2	21–11	
May 26	Western Michigan*	W 6–1	22–11	
May 26	Western Michigan*	W 6–0	23–11	

Postseason

NCAA District 4 Regional (4–1)
Date	Opponent	Site/stadium	Score	Overall record	NCAAT record
May 29	vs. Western Michigan	Hyames Field • Kalamazoo, MI	L 5–6^{10}	23–12	0–1
May 30	vs. Detroit	Hyames Field • Kalamazoo, MI	W 12-6	24–12	1–1
May 31	vs. Illinois	Hyames Field • Kalamazoo, MI	W 5–1	25–12	2–1
May 31	vs. Western Michigan	Hyames Field • Kalamazoo, MI	W 3–2^{10}	26–12	3–1
June 1	vs. Western Michigan	Hyames Field • Kalamazoo, MI	W 7–6^{10}	27–12	4–1

College World Series (4–1)
Date	Opponent	Site/stadium	Score	Overall record	CWS record
June 11	vs. Texas	Johnny Rosenblatt Stadium • Omaha, NE	W 3–1	28–12	1–0
June 12	vs. Holy Cross	Johnny Rosenblatt Stadium • Omaha, NE	W 11–4	29–12	2–0
June 13	vs. Florida State	Johnny Rosenblatt Stadium • Omaha, NE	W 10–7	30–12	3–0
June 14	vs. Texas	Johnny Rosenblatt Stadium • Omaha, NE	L 0–7	30–13	3–1
June 16	vs. Santa Clara	Johnny Rosenblatt Stadium • Omaha, NE	W 5–4^{15}	31–13	4–1

== Awards and honors ==
Dave Roebuck

- All-Big Ten First Team

Dennis Spalla

- All-Big Ten First Team
