= 1962 Santa Clara Broncos baseball team =

American college baseball season

1962 Santa Clara Broncos baseball

CIBA Champions District 8 champions

College World Series, Runner-Up
- Conference: California Intercollegiate Baseball Association

Ranking
- Coaches: No. 2
- CB: No. 2
- Record: 39–8 (12–4 CIBA)
- Head coach: John Cottrell (2nd season)
- Home stadium: Washington Field

1962 Athletic Association of Western Universities baseball standings
	Conf.				Overall
Team	W		L	PCT	W		L	PCT
North Division
No. 15 Oregon State ‍†‍‍^{y}	11	–	4	.733	26	–	6	.813
Oregon ‍‍‍	10	–	5	.667		–		–
Washington State ‍‍‍	8	–	5	.615	18	–	12	.600
Idaho ‍‍‍	5	–	10	.333		–		–
Washington ‍‍‍	3	–	13	.188	9	–	18	.333
California Intercollegiate Baseball Association
No. 2 Santa Clara ‍†‍‍^{y}	12	–	4	.750	39	–	8	.830
No. 23 Southern California ‍‍‍	11	–	5	.688	29	–	12	.707
California ‍‍‍	7	–	9	.438	24	–	20	.545
Stanford ‍‍‍	6	–	10	.375	21	–	14	.600
UCLA ‍‍‍	4	–	12	.250	23	–	22	.511
† – Conference champion y – Invited to the NCAA tournament As of June 30, 1962; Rankings from Collegiate Baseball

The 1962 Santa Clara Broncos baseball team represented Santa Clara University in the 1962 NCAA University Division baseball season. The Broncos played their home games at Washington Field, on the campus of Santa Clara High School. The team was coached by John Cottrell in his 2nd season at Santa Clara. The Broncos finished 39–8, winning the California Intercollegiate Baseball Association with a 12–4 record.

The Broncos reached the College World Series, finishing as runner up to the Michigan Wolverines after a 4–5 loss in the 15-inning championship game.

== Roster ==
1962 Santa Clara Broncos roster
Pitchers: Mark Amrien; Bob Garibaldi; Loren Harper; Dan Korbel; Pete Magrini; 21 - Charlie Marcenaro; Marty Samuelson	Catchers: Ron Calcango; Ron Cook; Infielders: John Boccabella; Tim Cullen; Ernie Fazio; 8 - John Giovanola; Gary Malvini	Outfielders: Tom Arrieta; Reno DiBono; Ken Flanagan; Larry Kaaha; Mickey McDermott; Nick Scurich

== Schedule and results ==
Legend
Santa Clara win
Santa Clara loss

1962 Santa Clara Broncos baseball game log

Regular season (31–5)
Date	Opponent	Site/stadium	Score	Overall record	CIBA record
	San Francisco State		W 8–3	1–0	–
	Philadelphia Phillies Rookies		W 4–1	2–0	–
	Baltimore Orioles Rookies		W 12–1	3–0	–
	San Jose State		W 8–1	4–0	–
	Pacific		W 23–4	5–0	–
	Pacific		W 3–0	6–0	–
	Philadelphia Phillies Rookies		W 11–9	7–0	–
	San Jose State		W 9–0	8–0	–
	Cal Poly		W 7–1	9–0	–
	San Francisco State		W 4–3	10–0	–
	Nevada		W 14–4	11–0	–
	San Francisco		W 9–5	12–0	–
	California		W 9–3	13–0	1–0
March 30	at UCLA	Joe E. Brown Field • Los Angeles, California	L 0–1	13–1	1–1
March 31	at UCLA	Joe E. Brown Field • Los Angeles, California	W 5–3	14–1	2–1
	California		L 2–3	14–2	2–2
April 7	Stanford	Washington Field • Santa Clara, California	W 4–3	15–2	3–2
April 7	Stanford	Washington Field • Santa Clara, California	W 19–7	16–2	4–2
	San Francisco		W 16–8	17–2	4–2
April 13	at USC	Bovard Field • Los Angeles, California	L 5–9	17–3	4–3
April 14	at USC	Bovard Field • Los Angeles, California	L 6–7	17–4	4–4
	San Diego		W 4–3	18–4	4–4
	Cal Poly		L 1–3	18–5	4–4
	Cal Poly		W 7–4	19–5	4–4
	California		W 3–1	20–5	5–4
April 27	USC	Washington Field • Santa Clara, California	W 10–0	21–5	6–4
April 28	UCLA	Washington Field • Santa Clara, California	W 6–1	22–5	7–4
April 28	UCLA	Washington Field • Santa Clara, California	W 10–2	23–5	8–4
	California		W 8–3	24–5	9–4
	Sacramento State		W 8–2	25–5	9–4
	Sacramento State		W 7–1	26–5	9–4
	San Francisco		W 18–4	27–5	9–4
	San Francisco		W 24–5	28–5	9–4
May 18	USC	Washington Field • Santa Clara, California	W 6–3	29–5	10–4
May 19	at Stanford	Sunken Diamond • Stanford, California	W 8–4	30–5	11–4
May 19	at Stanford	Sunken Diamond • Stanford, California	W 4–2	31–5	12–4

Postseason (8–3)

District 8 playoff (4–1)
Opponent	Site/stadium	Score	Overall record	CIBA record
Fresno State	Washington Field • Santa Clara, California	W 6–1	32–5	12–4
Fresno State	Washington Field • Santa Clara, California	L 1–3	32–6	12–4
Fresno State	Washington Field • Santa Clara, California	W 4–2	33–6	12–4
Oregon State	Washington Field • Santa Clara, California	W 8–1	34–6	12–4
Oregon State	Washington Field • Santa Clara, California	W 7–5	35–6	12–4

1962 College World Series (4–2)
Date	Opponent	Site/stadium	Score	Overall record	CIBA record
June 11	vs Florida State	Johnny Rosenblatt Stadium • Omaha, Nebraska	L 1–5	35–7	12–4
June 12	vs Missouri	Johnny Rosenblatt Stadium • Omaha, Nebraska	W 7–4^{12}	36–7	12–4
June 13	vs Holy Cross	Johnny Rosenblatt Stadium • Omaha, Nebraska	W 12–7	37–7	12–4
June 14	vs Florida State	Johnny Rosenblatt Stadium • Omaha, Nebraska	W 11–6	38–7	12–4
June 15	vs Texas	Johnny Rosenblatt Stadium • Omaha, Nebraska	W 4–3^{10}	39–7	12–4
June 16	vs Michigan	Johnny Rosenblatt Stadium • Omaha, Nebraska	L 4–5^{15}	39–8	12–4

Schedule source:

== Awards and honors ==
Ernie Fazio

- All Tournament Team
- All-CIBA Team
- First Team All-American

Ken Flanagan

- All Tournament Team

Mickey McDermott

- All Tournament Team
- All-CIBA Team

Bob Garibaldi

- All Tournament Team
- All-CIBA Team

John Boccabella

- All-CIBA Team

John Giovanola

- All-CIBA Team

Tim Cullen

- All-CIBA Team
