= 1962 NAIA World Series =

1962 NAIA baseball tournament
- 1962 NAIA World Series
- Teams: 8
- Format: Double elimination
- Finals site: Phil Welch Stadium; St. Joseph, Missouri
- Champions: Georgia Southern (1st title)
- Winning coach: J.I. Clements
- MVP: Ed Spiezio (3B) (Lewis)

The 1962 NAIA World Series was the sixth annual tournament hosted by the National Association of Intercollegiate Athletics to determine the national champion of baseball among its member colleges and universities in the United States and Canada.

The tournament was played at Phil Welch Stadium in St. Joseph, Missouri.

Georgia Southern (21-8) defeated Portland State (25-12) in the championship series, 2–0, to win the Eagles' first NAIA World Series.

Lewis third baseman, and future two-time World Series champion with the St. Louis Cardinals, Ed Spiezio was named tournament MVP.

== Bracket ==
Upper round 1	Upper round 2	Upper final	Final
Florida A&M	1
Portland State	2
Portland State	5
Sam Houston State	3
Lewis (IL)	1
Sam Houston State	4
Portland State	2
Georgia Southern	5
Georgia Southern	8
Minot State	3
Georgia Southern	1
Winona State	0
California State (PA)	4
Winona State	6	Georgia Southern	2
Portland State	0
Lower round 1	Lower round 2	Lower round 3	Lower final
Sam Houston State	0
Florida A&M	4	Lewis	1	Portland State	8
Lewis	5	Lewis	5	Lewis	1
Winona State	3
Winona State	7
Minot State	1	California State	0
California State	2

== See also ==
- 1962 NCAA University Division baseball tournament
