= Al Stanek =

American baseball player (1943-2018)

- Pitcher
- Born: December 24, 1943; Springfield, Massachusetts, U.S.
- Died: May 8, 2018 (aged 74); Springfield, Massachusetts, U.S.
- Batted: Left Threw: Left

MLB debut
- April 26, 1963, for the San Francisco Giants

Last MLB appearance
- September 27, 1963, for the San Francisco Giants

MLB statistics
- Win–loss record: 0–0
- Earned run average: 4.73
- Innings pitched: 13 1/3
- Stats at Baseball Reference

Teams
- San Francisco Giants (1963)

Albert Wilfred Stanek (December 24, 1943 – May 8, 2018), nicknamed "Lefty", was an American professional baseball player. He pitched in the major leagues during 1963 with the San Francisco Giants. He batted and threw left-handed, stood 5 feet 11 inches (1.80 m) tall and weighed 190 pounds (86 kg).

== Biography ==
Born in 1943 in Springfield, Massachusetts, Stanek was signed by the San Francisco Giants in 1962 after graduating from Chicopee High School. Signed in late June, his signing bonus was reported to be at least $40,000 ($425,743 in 2025).

Stanek began his professional career that year with the local Springfield Giants, a Class A Giants farm team in the Eastern League. In 12 games (11 starts) with the minor-league Giants, he recorded a 4.71 earned run average (ERA) while striking out 63 batters in 65 innings pitched and compiled a 3–3 win–loss record.

Stanek spent the 1963 season, at age 19, with the major-league Giants under the terms of the bonus rule. At this time, a team could send one "bonus rookie" to the minor leagues without exposing that player to being signed by another team. The Giants demoted fellow rookie pitcher Bob Garibaldi while keeping Stanek with the big league team. Stanek posted a 0–0 record, with a 4.73 ERA, in 11 appearances (all in relief) during what proved to be his only major-league season.

Stanek's professional career lasted through the 1967, as he remained in the Giants' farm system. Overall during five seasons in Minor League Baseball, he compiled a 29–37 record with a 3.51 ERA in 557 innings pitched while striking out 436 batters.

Chicopee High School honored Stanek by retiring his jersey, number 21, and inducting him to the school's athletic hall of fame. He was inducted to the Western Massachusetts Baseball Hall of Fame in 2014. Stanek died on May 8, 2018.
