= 1962 Florida State Seminoles baseball team =

American college baseball season

1962 Florida State Seminoles baseball

NCAA District 3 champions

College World Series, 2–2
- Conference: Independent
- Record: 23–14
- Head coach: Danny Litwhiler (8th year)
- Home stadium: Seminole Field

1962 NCAA University Division District 3 baseball independents standings
	Conf.				Overall
Team	W		L	PCT	W		L	PCT
No. 4 Florida State ‍‍‍^{y}		–		–	23	–	14	.622
Louisville ‍‍‍		–		–	11	–	7	.611
Jacksonville ‍‍‍		–		–	12	–	11	.522
Elon ‍‍‍		–		–	16	–	15	.516
Georgetown ‍‍‍		–		–	4	–	10	.286
Stetson ‍‍‍		–		–	6	–	17	.261
Mercer ‍‍‍		–		–	5	–	16	.238
y – Invited to the NCAA tournament As of June 30, 1962; Rankings from Collegiate Baseball

The 1962 Florida State Seminoles baseball team represented Florida State University in the 1962 NCAA University Division baseball season. The Seminoles played their home games at Seminole Field. The team was coached by Danny Litwhiler in his eighth season at Florida State.

The Seminoles reached the College World Series, their second appearance in Omaha, where they finished in fourth place after recording an opening round win against Santa Clara and a second-round game against Ithaca, then losing against eventual champion Michigan and a semifinal match up against runner-up Santa Clara.

== Personnel ==
=== Roster ===
1962 Florida State Seminoles roster
Pitchers: - Barnes; - Phil Bondank - Junior; - Frank Echols - Junior; - John Tucker - Junior; 15 - Marty Howell - Sophomore; 17 - Tom Davis - Sophomore; 19 - Ray McShane - Senior; 23 - Jack Ross - Senior; 27 - Allen Thomas - Junior; 33 - Larry Hawkins - Junior; 37 - Butch Ferrar - Junior	Catchers: - Lincoln Jarrett C; 32 - Paul Dirks - Sophomore; 35 - Bud Teagle - Junior; Infielders: 10 - Larry Johnson - Sophomore; 12 - Kyle Spitzer - Senior; 14 - George Ferguson - Senior; 22 - Billy Williamson - Junior; 24 - Hal Mangin - Senior; 28 - George Rountree - Sophomore; 30 - Woody Woodward - Sophomore; 36 - Al Beccaccio - (redshirt) Junior	Outfielders: - Darwin Shiflett; 9 - Mike Augustine - Sophomore; 11 - Gary Elliott - Junior; 16 - Doug French - Senior; 18 - Dwight Smith - Junior; 20 - Bob Madison - Senior; 26 - Woody Litwhiler - Sophomore; 31 - Bob Wilcox - Sophomore

=== Coaches ===
1962 Florida State Seminoles baseball coaching staff
- Danny Litwhiler – Head coach – 8th year

== Schedule and results ==
Legend
Florida State win
Florida State loss

1962 Florida State Seminoles baseball game log
Regular season

March
Date	Opponent	Site/stadium	Score	Overall record
Mar 14	Georgia	Seminole Field • Tallahassee, FL	W 13–3	1–0
Mar 15	Georgia	Seminole Field • Tallahassee, FL	W 6–3	2–0
Mar 16	Auburn	Seminole Field • Tallahassee, FL	L 7–12	2–1
Mar 17	Auburn	Seminole Field • Tallahassee, FL	L 2–10	2–2
Mar 19	Georgia Tech	Seminole Field • Tallahassee, FL	W 10–4	3–2
Mar 20	Georgia Tech	Seminole Field • Tallahassee, FL	W 9–8	4–2
Mar 21	Georgia Tech	Seminole Field • Tallahassee, FL	W 7–6	5–2
Mar 23	vs Navy	Naval Air Station Jacksonville • Jacksonville, FL	W 8–2	6–2
Mar 30	Clemson	Seminole Field • Tallahassee, FL	W 14–8	7–2

April
Date	Opponent	Site/stadium	Score	Overall record
Apr 2	Furman	Seminole Field • Tallahassee, FL	L 2–7	7–3
Apr 3	Furman	Seminole Field • Tallahassee, FL	W 21–9	8–3
Apr 9	at Auburn	Plainsman Park • Auburn, AL	L 6–7	8–4
Apr 10	at Auburn	Plainsman Park • Auburn, AL	L 3–5	8–5
Apr 16	Miami (FL)	Seminole Field • Tallahassee, FL	L 4–6	8–6
Apr 17	Miami (FL)	Seminole Field • Tallahassee, FL	W 9–8	9–6
Apr 19	at Clemson	Riggs Field • Clemson, SC	L 11–14	9–7
Apr 20	at Duke	Jack Coombs Field • Durham, NC	W 3–1	10–7
Apr 21	at Duke	Jack Coombs Field • Durham, NC	L 4–5	10–8
Apr 23	vs East Carolina	Emerson Field • Chapel Hill, NC	L 2–19	10–9
Apr 23	at North Carolina	Emerson Field • Chapel Hill, NC	W 9–2	11–9
Apr 24	at NC State	Riddick Stadium • Raleigh, NC	W 12–3	12–9
Apr 25	at Georgia Southern	Statesboro, GA	W 5–1	13–9

May
Date	Opponent	Site/stadium	Score	Overall record
May 11	Florida Southern	Seminole Field • Tallahassee, FL	W 9–7	14–9
May 12	Florida Southern	Seminole Field • Tallahassee, FL	W 12–11	15–9
May 14	Georgia Southern	Seminole Field • Tallahassee, FL	L 2–4	15–10
May 15	Georgia Southern	Seminole Field • Tallahassee, FL	W 8–2	16–10
May 18	at Florida	Perry Field • Gainesville, FL	L 5–9	16–11
May 19	at Florida	Perry Field • Gainesville, FL	W 6–2	17–11

Postseason

NCAA District 3 playoff
Date	Opponent	Site/stadium	Score	Overall record	NCAAT record
May 31	Florida	Sims Legion Park • Gastonia, NC	L 0–1	17–12	0–1
June 1	West Virginia	Sims Legion Park • Gastonia, NC	W 6–5	18–12	1–1
June 2	Florida	Sims Legion Park • Gastonia, NC	W 3–1^{5}	19–12	2–1
June 4	Wake Forest	Sims Legion Park • Gastonia, NC	W 10–8	20–12	3–1
June 4	Wake Forest	Sims Legion Park • Gastonia, NC	W 3–2^{11}	21–12	4–1

College World Series
Date	Opponent	Site/stadium	Score	Overall record	CWS record
June 11	Santa Clara	Johnny Rosenblatt Stadium • Omaha, NE	W 5–1	22–12	1–0
June 11	Ithaca	Johnny Rosenblatt Stadium • Omaha, NE	W 5–4	23–12	2–0
June 13	Michigan	Johnny Rosenblatt Stadium • Omaha, NE	L 7–10	23–13	2–1
June 14	Santa Clara	Johnny Rosenblatt Stadium • Omaha, NE	L 6–11	23–14	2–2
