= Tom Fletcher (baseball) =

American baseball player (1942–2018)

- Pitcher
- Born: June 28, 1942; Elmira, New York, U.S.
- Died: May 9, 2018 (aged 75); Danville, Illinois, U.S.
- Batted: Both Threw: Left

MLB debut
- September 12, 1962, for the Detroit Tigers

Last MLB appearance
- September 12, 1962, for the Detroit Tigers

MLB statistics
- Win–loss record: 0–0
- Earned run average: 0.00
- Strikeouts: 1
- Stats at Baseball Reference

Teams
- Detroit Tigers (1962)

Thomas Wayne Fletcher (June 28, 1942 – May 9, 2018) was an American professional baseball player and former Major League pitcher, a left-hander who appeared in one game with the Detroit Tigers in 1962. He attended the University of Illinois at Urbana–Champaign, where he was a 1962 College Baseball All-America Team selection.

Fletcher was born in Elmira, New York in 1942. That year, his father, Glen, was playing minor league baseball in Elmira with the Elmira Pioneers.

Listed as 6 feet (1.8 m) tall and 175 pounds (79 kg), Fletcher signed with the Tigers in 1962 and spent the bulk of the season with the Knoxville Smokies of the Sally League, getting into 17 games (with 11 starts) and posting a sterling 2.33 earned run average with two complete games and a shutout. Detroit recalled him in September when rosters expanded to 40 men, and on the 12th, he made his MLB debut at Tiger Stadium. Entering a game against the Boston Red Sox with Detroit trailing, 6–2, he pitched the eighth and ninth innings, allowing two bases on balls, one hit, and a wild pitch, but he held the Bosox off the scoreboard. He struck out one hitter, pitcher Mike Fornieles. His line during those two innings pitched ultimately constituted his big-league statistical legacy.

Within two weeks of his Major League debut, Fletcher was admitted to Henry Ford Hospital with the left side of his body paralyzed. He was diagnosed with thrombophlebitis and missed the entire 1963 season. When he returned to baseball, his arm was much weaker and the Tigers released him after parts of five more minor league seasons.

He signed with the Minnesota Twins to finish the 1968 minor league season but told Sports Illustrated that he would retire and return home to Illinois to finish his degree if he was not selected in the 1968 Major League Baseball expansion draft. He would not be selected in the expansion draft and 1968 would be his final professional baseball season.

His son Darrin, a catcher, had a 14-season, 1,245-game MLB career for four clubs and was a 1994 National League All-Star.

Tom Fletcher died in Oakwood, Illinois, on May 9, 2018.
