= 1962 NCAA University Division baseball season =

Baseball season

NCAA tournament
- Duration: May 29–June 16, 1962

College World Series
- Champions: Michigan (2nd title)
- Runners-up: Santa Clara (1st CWS Appearance)
- Winning coach: Don Lund (1st title)
- MOP: Bob Garibaldi (Santa Clara)

Seasons
- ← 1961 1963 →

The 1962 NCAA University Division baseball season, play of college baseball in the United States organized by the National Collegiate Athletic Association (NCAA) began in the spring of 1962. The season progressed through the regular season and concluded with the 1962 College World Series. The College World Series, held for the sixteenth time in 1962, consisted of one team from each of eight geographical districts and was held in Omaha, Nebraska at Johnny Rosenblatt Stadium as a double-elimination tournament. Michigan claimed the championship.

== Conference winners ==
This is a partial list of conference champions from the 1962 season. Each of the eight geographical districts chose, by various methods, the team that would represent them in the NCAA tournament. 8 teams earned automatic bids by winning their conference championship while 19 teams earned at-large selections.

Conference	Regular season winner
Atlantic Coast Conference	Wake Forest
Big Eight Conference	Missouri
Big Ten Conference	Illinois
CIBA	Santa Clara
EIBL	Navy
Mid-American Conference	Western Michigan
Middle Atlantic Conference	Gettysburg
Pacific Coast Conference	Oregon State
Southeastern Conference	Florida
Southern Conference	West Virginia
Southwest Conference	Texas
Yankee Conference	Vermont

== Conference standings ==
The following is an incomplete list of conference standings:

1962 Athletic Association of Western Universities baseball standings
	Conf.				Overall
Team	W		L	PCT	W		L	PCT
North Division
No. 15 Oregon State ‍†‍‍^{y}	11	–	4	.733	26	–	6	.813
Oregon ‍‍‍	10	–	5	.667		–		–
Washington State ‍‍‍	8	–	5	.615	18	–	12	.600
Idaho ‍‍‍	5	–	10	.333		–		–
Washington ‍‍‍	3	–	13	.188	9	–	18	.333
California Intercollegiate Baseball Association
No. 2 Santa Clara ‍†‍‍^{y}	12	–	4	.750	39	–	8	.830
No. 23 Southern California ‍‍‍	11	–	5	.688	29	–	12	.707
California ‍‍‍	7	–	9	.438	24	–	20	.545
Stanford ‍‍‍	6	–	10	.375	21	–	14	.600
UCLA ‍‍‍	4	–	12	.250	23	–	22	.511
† – Conference champion y – Invited to the NCAA tournament As of June 30, 1962; Rankings from Collegiate Baseball

1962 NCAA University Division District 3 baseball independents standings
	Conf.				Overall
Team	W		L	PCT	W		L	PCT
No. 4 Florida State ‍‍‍^{y}		–		–	23	–	14	.622
Louisville ‍‍‍		–		–	11	–	7	.611
Jacksonville ‍‍‍		–		–	12	–	11	.522
Elon ‍‍‍		–		–	16	–	15	.516
Georgetown ‍‍‍		–		–	4	–	10	.286
Stetson ‍‍‍		–		–	6	–	17	.261
Mercer ‍‍‍		–		–	5	–	16	.238
y – Invited to the NCAA tournament As of June 30, 1962; Rankings from Collegiate Baseball

1962 Big Eight Conference baseball standings
	Conf.				Overall
Team	W		L	PCT	W		L	PCT
No. 7 Missouri ‍†‍‍^{y}	16	–	5	.762	22	–	7	.759
Oklahoma State ‍‍‍	10	–	6	.625	11	–	9	.550
Kansas ‍‍‍	13	–	8	.619	16	–	11	.593
Iowa State ‍‍‍	9	–	9	.500	10	–	10	.500
Nebraska ‍‍‍	10	–	10	.500	15	–	11	.577
Colorado ‍‍‍	9	–	10	.474	13	–	12	.520
Oklahoma ‍‍‍	8	–	13	.381	9	–	17	.346
Kansas State ‍‍‍	2	–	16	.111	4	–	18	.182
† – Conference champion y – Invited to the NCAA tournament As of June 30, 1962; Rankings from Collegiate Baseball

1962 Southern Conference baseball standings
	Conf.				Overall
Team	W		L	PCT	W		L	PCT
No. 20 West Virginia ‍†‍‍^{y}	9	–	2	.818	19	–	8	.704
Richmond ‍‍‍	8	–	3	.727	12	–	5	.706
Furman ‍‍‍	6	–	3	.667	12	–	9	.571
Virginia Tech ‍‍‍	7	–	5	.583	11	–	6	.647
VMI ‍‍‍	7	–	7	.500	8	–	7	.533
George Washington ‍‍‍	4	–	6	.400	8	–	7	.533
Davidson ‍‍‍	3	–	7	.300	8	–	16	.333
The Citadel ‍‍‍	3	–	7	.300	10	–	13	.435
William & Mary ‍‍‍	3	–	10	.231	4	–	12	.250
† – Conference champion y – Invited to the NCAA Tournament; As of June 30, 1962; Rankings from Collegiate Baseball

1962 Big Ten Conference baseball standings
	Conf.						Overall
Team	W		L		T	PCT	W		L		T	PCT
No. 11 Illinois ‍†‍‍^{y}	13	–	2	–	0	.867	25	–	6	–	0	.806
No. 1 Michigan ‍‍‍^{y}	12	–	3	–	0	.800	31	–	13	–	0	.705
Ohio State ‍‍‍	9	–	5	–	0	.643	19	–	4	–	0	.826
Michigan State ‍‍‍	6	–	6	–	0	.500	17	–	13	–	0	.567
Wisconsin ‍‍‍	6	–	6	–	0	.500	14	–	9	–	0	.609
Indiana ‍‍‍	6	–	8	–	0	.429	16	–	13	–	0	.552
Iowa ‍‍‍	5	–	9	–	0	.357	13	–	16	–	1	.450
Northwestern ‍‍‍	5	–	9	–	0	.357	11	–	6	–	0	.647
Purdue ‍‍‍	4	–	11	–	0	.267	14	–	14	–	1	.500
Minnesota ‍‍‍	3	–	10	–	0	.231	14	–	16	–	0	.467
† – Conference champion y – Invited to the NCAA tournament As of June 30, 1962; Rankings from Collegiate Baseball

1962 Southwest Conference baseball standings
	Conf.				Overall
Team	W		L	PCT	W		L	PCT
No. 3 Texas ‍†‍‍^{y}	12	–	2	.857	26	–	7	.788
No. 18 Texas A&M ‍‍‍	11	–	4	.733	18	–	7	.720
Baylor ‍‍‍	9	–	5	.643	17	–	7	.708
TCU ‍‍‍	6	–	9	.400	12	–	11	.522
Rice ‍‍‍	4	–	9	.308	10	–	12	.455
SMU ‍‍‍	0	–	13	.000	0	–	21	.000
† – Conference champion y – Invited to the NCAA tournament As of June 30, 1962; Rankings from Collegiate Baseball

== College World Series ==
The 1962 season marked the sixteenth NCAA baseball tournament, which culminated with the eight team College World Series. The College World Series was held in Omaha, Nebraska. The eight teams played a double-elimination format, with Michigan claiming their second championship with a 5–4, fifteen-inning win over Santa Clara in the final.

Upper round 1
Holy Cross	4
Colorado State College	3
Michigan	3
Texas	1
Ithaca	5
Missouri	1
Florida State	5
Santa Clara	1

Upper round 2
Michigan	11
Holy Cross	4
Florida State	5
Ithaca	4
Lower round 1
Texas	12
Colorado State College	2
Santa Clara	7^{12}
Missouri	4

Upper final
Michigan	10
Florida State	7
Lower round 2
Ithaca	2
Texas	3
Holy Cross	7
Santa Clara	12

Semifinals
Santa Clara	11
Florida State	6
Michigan	0
Texas	7

Preliminary final
Santa Clara	4^{10}
Texas	3

Final
Michigan	5^{15}
Santa Clara	4
