= Bucky Freeman =

American football and baseball coach

Biographical details
- Born: July 19, 1895; Bergen, New York, U.S.
- Died: December 25, 1987 (aged 92); Ithaca, New York, U.S.

Coaching career (HC unless noted)

Football
- 1931–1946: Ithaca

Baseball
- 1932–1965: Ithaca

Head coaching record
- Overall: 36–32–6 (football); 283–83–2 (basbeball)

Accomplishments and honors

Awards
- American Baseball Coaches Association Hall of Fame

James A. "Bucky" Freeman (July 19, 1895 – December 25, 1987) was an American college football and college baseball coach. He served as the head football coach at t Ithaca College in Ithaca, New York from 1931 to 1946 and as the school's head baseball coach from 1932 to 1965. Freeman led his 1962 Ithaca Bombers baseball team to the College World Series.

== Coaching career ==
=== Football ===
Freeman was the second head football coach at Ithaca College in Ithaca, New York. He held that position for 13 seasons, from 1931 until 1946, with exception of the years 1944 to 1945, when the school did not field a team due to World War II. His coaching record at Ithaca was 36–32–6. In the fall of 1935, Freeman was stricken with typhoid fever, and remained at his wife's home in Fort Edward, New York. Ithaca senior Ben Pismanoff, later known as Ben Light, served as acting head coach for the season, leading the team to a record of 4–1–1. Ithaca credits Freeman and Light as co-coaches for the 1935 season.

=== Baseball ===
Freeman was also the baseball coach at Ithaca, from 1931 through the 1965 season. He was only the second coach to hold the position, and included an appearance in the 1962 College World Series. His teams combined for a career winning percentage of .773 with a record of 283–83–2. As coach he led his teams to four NCAA tournament appearances at a time when all NCAA teams played in the same division.

Freeman later coached at Cornell and was inducted into the American Baseball Coaches Association Hall of Fame.

== Death ==
Freeman died on December 25, 1987, at Tompkins Community Hospital in Ithaca.

== Head coaching record ==
Year	Team	Overall	Conference	Standing	Bowl/playoffs
Ithaca Blue and Gold / Bombers (Independent) (1931–1946)
1931	Ithaca	3–2			
1932	Ithaca	4–2–1			
1933	Ithaca	3–2–1			
1934	Ithaca	5–1			
1935	Ithaca	4–1–1			
1936	Ithaca	3–2			
1937	Ithaca	2–4			
1938	Ithaca	3–1–2			
1939	Ithaca	3–3			
1940	Ithaca	3–1–1			
1941	Ithaca	2–4			
1942	Ithaca	0–4			
1943	No team—World War II				
1944	No team—World War II				
1945	No team—World War II				
1946	Ithaca	1–5			
Ithaca:		36–32–6			
Total:		36–32–6			
