= Cynthia Kieras Phillips =

American plasma physicist

Cynthia Elizabeth Kieras Phillips (1954 – September 1, 2015) was an American physicist known for her work on plasma, and on the use of radio waves to heat plasma for applications in magnetic confinement fusion.

== Early life and education ==
Cynthia Kieras was born in 1954 in Holyoke, Massachusetts, grew up nearby in Chicopee, Massachusetts, and graduated from Chicopee High School in 1972.

She majored in physics at the Massachusetts Institute of Technology, earning a bachelor's degree in 1976, and then went to the University of Wisconsin–Madison for graduate study in physics. There, she earned a master's degree in 1977, and completed her Ph.D. in 1982. Her doctoral dissertation, Shear Alfvén Waves in Tokamaks, was jointly supervised by John Tataronis and Keith Symon.

== Career and later life ==
Phillips became a researcher at Princeton University in 1983, eventually becoming a principal research physicist in the Princeton Plasma Physics Laboratory and a lecturer in the Department of Astrophysical Sciences.

She died on September 1, 2015, at the University Medical Center of Princeton at Plainsboro.

== Recognition ==
Phillips was named a distinguished lecturer of the American Physical Society Division of Plasma Physics for 2001–2002. She was elected as a Fellow of the American Physical Society in 2005, after a nomination from the Division of Plasma Physics, "in recognition of her fundamental theoretical and experimental contributions to the understanding of radio frequency wave-particle interactions in fusion plasmas".
