= Dan Schneider (baseball) =

American baseball player (born 1942)

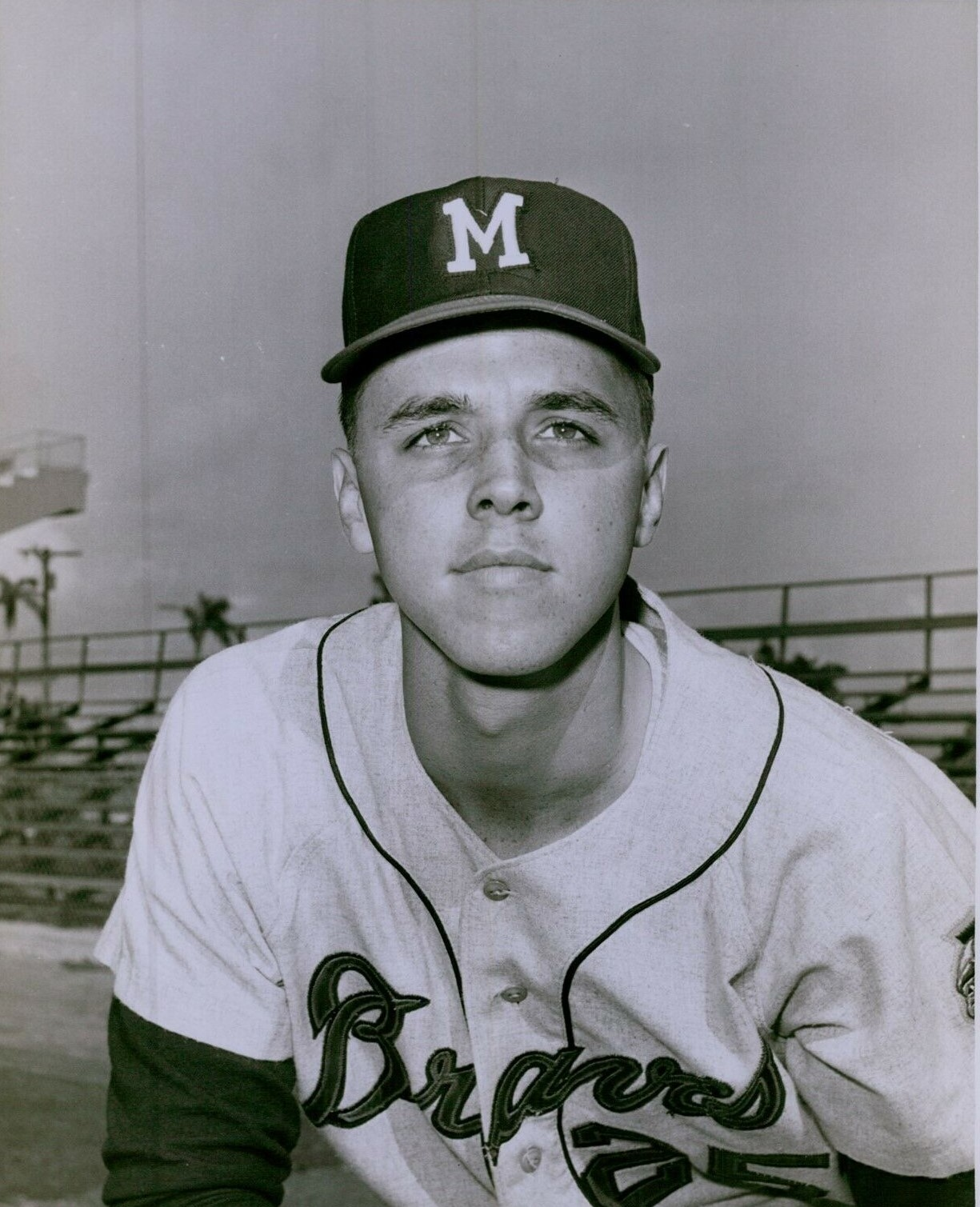
- Schneider in 1964
- Pitcher
- Born: August 29, 1942 (age 83); Evansville, Indiana, U.S.
- Batted: Left Threw: Left

MLB debut
- May 12, 1963, for the Milwaukee Braves

Last MLB appearance
- April 27, 1969, for the Houston Astros

MLB statistics
- Win–loss record: 2–5
- Earned run average: 4.71
- Strikeouts: 86
- Stats at Baseball Reference

Teams
- Milwaukee / Atlanta Braves (1963–1964, 1966); Houston Astros (1967, 1969)

Daniel Louis Schneider (born August 29, 1942) is an American former professional baseball player. He played in Major League Baseball as a left-handed pitcher between 1963 and 1969 for the Milwaukee Braves and the Houston Astros.

== Career ==
Schneider was a left-handed pitcher who played for Rincon High School in Tucson, Arizona and the University of Arizona, where he made the 1962 College Baseball All-America Team. In June 1962, Schneider was signed by the Milwaukee Braves. He played with them through the 1966 season (when the team moved to Atlanta) and then was traded to the Houston Astros. His professional career lasted nine seasons, 1962–1970. In 117 Major League games played, eight as a starting pitcher, Schneider allowed 185 hits and 70 bases on balls in 166 1/3 innings pitched. He notched 86 strikeouts and two saves.

Schneider was inducted into the University of Arizona Hall of Fame in 2019.
