= Garry St. Jean =

American basketball coach and executive

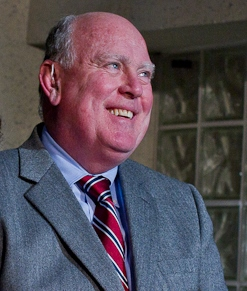
- St. Jean with Comcast SportsNet Bay Area in January 2012.

Personal information
- Born: February 10, 1950 (age 76) Chicopee, Massachusetts, U.S.
- Listed height: 6 ft 4 in (1.93 m)
- Listed weight: 210 lb (95 kg)

Career information
- High school: Chicopee (Chicopee, Massachusetts)
- College: Springfield (MA)
- Coaching career: 1973–2000

Career history

Coaching
- 1973–1980: Chicopee HS
- 1980–1985: Milwaukee Bucks (assistant)
- 1985–1988: New Jersey Nets (assistant)
- 1988–1992: Golden State Warriors (assistant)
- 1992–1997: Sacramento Kings
- 1999–2000: Golden State Warriors

Career coaching record
- NBA: 172–278 (.382)
- Record at Basketball Reference

Garry St. Jean (born February 10, 1950) is an American former professional basketball coach and executive.

St. Jean grew up in Chicopee, Massachusetts, and attended nearby Springfield College, where he joined the basketball team during his freshman year. The following summer, St. Jean suffered a devastating knee injury during a soccer game, which effectively ended his college playing career. Subsequently he shifted his focus to the school's renowned Physical Education program, with the goal of becoming a coach.

At age 21, while still in college, St. Jean was hired to coach the varsity basketball team at his alma mater, Chicopee High School, and guided the team to a 16-6 record after it had finished 2-20 the previous season. In recognition of the team's dramatic turnaround, a local state representative invited St. Jean and his players to the Massachusetts State House to meet with members of the Boston Celtics. During this meeting, Celtics player Don Nelson asked St. Jean if any of his players were interested in attending Nelson's summer basketball camp. When St. Jean replied that many of his players did not have a reliable means of transportation, Nelson offered him a job at the camp in order to ensure that the players could attend.

St. Jean worked at Nelson's basketball camp for six years, before Nelson hired him as a scout for the Milwaukee Bucks, whom Nelson had begun coaching two years prior. During a preseason game before the 1978-79 season, the young St. Jean was spotted on the bench by referee Earl Strom. When informed that St. Jean was a scout, Strom warned Nelson that league rules permitted only coaches, players and trainers to sit on the bench during games. The Bucks named St. Jean as an assistant coach the very next day.

St. Jean served as an assistant coach in Milwaukee until 1986. He later served as an assistant coach for the New Jersey Nets (1986–88) and Golden State Warriors (1988-92).

In May 1992, St. Jean was hired as head coach of the Sacramento Kings. In 1996, he led the Kings to their first playoff appearance in ten years, and the only playoff appearance of his coaching tenure, against the top-seeded Seattle Sonics. Behind the play of Mitch Richmond and Šarūnas Marčiulionis, the Kings earned a shocking upset victory in Game 2 in Seattle, but upon return to Sacramento lost Games 3 and 4, and the Best-of-5 series. St. Jean would return to coach the Kings the following season before being fired in March 1997, with the team mired in a slump.

St. Jean later became the general manager of the Golden State Warriors, and in 1999–2000 he doubled as a head coach after P. J. Carlesimo was fired. St. Jean was a pro scout for the New Jersey Nets in the 2010–11 season.

He has been an in-studio analyst for Golden State Warriors coverage on NBC Sports Bay Area since the start of the 2011–2012 season. His son Greg St. Jean is currently an assistant coach for the Los Angeles Lakers.

St. Jean was inducted into the Springfield College Hall of Fame in 1996.

== Coaching career ==
Team	Year	G	W	L	W–L%	Finish	PG	PW	PL	PW–L%	Result
Sacramento	1992–93	82	25	57	.305	7th in Pacific Division	—	—	—	—	Missed playoffs
Sacramento	1993–94	82	28	54	.341	6th in Pacific Division	—	—	—	—	Missed playoffs
Sacramento	1994–95	82	39	43	.476	5th in Pacific Division	—	—	—	—	Missed playoffs
Sacramento	1995–96	82	39	43	.476	5th in Pacific Division	4	1	3	.250	Lost first round
Sacramento	1996–97	67	28	39	.418	6th in Pacific Division	—	—	—	—	Missed playoffs
Golden State	1999–2000	55	13	42	.236	6th in Pacific Division	—	—	—	—	Missed playoffs
Career		450	172	278	.382		4	1	3	.250	

Preceded by Dave Twardzik	Golden State Warriors general manager 1997–2004	Succeeded by Chris Mullin
