= 1962 Missouri Tigers baseball team =

American college baseball season

1962 Missouri Tigers baseball

Big Eight champions District V champions

College World Series, T-7th
- Conference: Big Eight Conference
- Record: 22–7 (16–5 Big 8)
- Head coach: Hi Simmons (22nd season)
- Captain: George Hulett
- Home stadium: Simmons Field

1962 Big Eight Conference baseball standings
	Conf.				Overall
Team	W		L	PCT	W		L	PCT
No. 7 Missouri ‍†‍‍^{y}	16	–	5	.762	22	–	7	.759
Oklahoma State ‍‍‍	10	–	6	.625	11	–	9	.550
Kansas ‍‍‍	13	–	8	.619	16	–	11	.593
Iowa State ‍‍‍	9	–	9	.500	10	–	10	.500
Nebraska ‍‍‍	10	–	10	.500	15	–	11	.577
Colorado ‍‍‍	9	–	10	.474	13	–	12	.520
Oklahoma ‍‍‍	8	–	13	.381	9	–	17	.346
Kansas State ‍‍‍	2	–	16	.111	4	–	18	.182
† – Conference champion y – Invited to the NCAA tournament As of June 30, 1962; Rankings from Collegiate Baseball

The 1962 Missouri Tigers baseball team represented University of Missouri in the 1962 NCAA University Division baseball season. The Tigers played their home games at Simmons Field. The team was coached by Hi Simmons in his 22nd year as head coach at Missouri.

The Tigers won the District V Playoff to advance to the College World Series, where they were defeated by the Santa Clara Broncos.

== Roster ==
1962 Missouri Tigers baseball team
Players
Coaches

#	Pos.	Name	B/T	Height	Weight	Year	Home town
	P	Larry Bohannon	/	—	—	Jr
		Jim Card	/	—	—	Jr
		Jim Estes	/	—	—
		Wayde Frederickson	/	—	—
	INF	Dave Harvey	/	—	—	So
	INF	George Hulett	/	—	—	Sr
	P	Bobby Jenkins	/	—	—	Sr
	INF	Gene McArtor	/	—	—	Jr
		Rich Peterson	/	—	—	Jr
	INF	Rob Price	/	—	—	So
	OF	Dan Reilly	/	—	—	Sr
		Jim Sevcik	/	—	—	So
	C	John Sevcik	/	—	—	So
		Ron Sieck	/	—	—
	P	Keith Weber	/	—	—	So

Head coach

Hi Simmons

Assistant coach(es)

Legend

- (C) Team captain
- (S) Suspended
- (I) Ineligible
- Injured
- Current redshirt

[2 Roster]
Last update: January 11, 2022

== Schedule ==
1962 Missouri Tigers baseball game log
Regular season
March (2–0)

#	Date	Opponent	Site/stadium	Score	Overall record	Big 8 record
1	March 29	at Arkansas State	Unknown • Jonesboro, Arkansas	9–2	1–0	0–0
2	March 29	at Arkansas State	Unknown • Jonesboro, Arkansas	7–3	2–0	0–0

April (11–3)

#	Date	Opponent	Site/stadium	Score	Big 8 record	Overall record
3	April 2	Arkansas	Simmons Field • Columbia, Missouri	15–7	3–0	0–0
4	April 3	Arkansas	Simmons Field • Columbia, Missouri	10–4	4–0	0–0
5	April 6	Iowa State	Simmons Field • Columbia, Missouri	12–8	5–0	1–0
6	April 7	Iowa State	Simmons Field • Columbia, Missouri	13–3	6–0	2–0
7	April 7	Iowa State	Simmons Field • Columbia, Missouri	3–0	7–0	3–0
8	April 13	at Colorado	Unknown • Boulder, Colorado	9–1	8–0	4–0
9	April 13	at Colorado	Unknown • Boulder, Colorado	0–4	8–1	4–1
10	April 14	at Colorado	Unknown • Boulder, Colorado	10–7	9–1	5–1
11	April 16	Kansas	Simmons Field • Columbia, Missouri	3–9	9–2	5–2
12	April 17	Kansas	Simmons Field • Columbia, Missouri	0–8	9–3	5–3
13	April 17	Kansas	Simmons Field • Columbia, Missouri	7–5	10–3	6–3
14	April 27	at Nebraska	Husker Diamond • Lincoln, Nebraska	12–5	11–3	7–3
15	April 27	at Nebraska	Husker Diamond • Lincoln, Nebraska	4–2	12–3	8–3
16	April 28	at Nebraska	Husker Diamond • Lincoln, Nebraska	1–0	13–3	9–3

May (7–2)

#	Date	Opponent	Site/stadium	Score	Overall record	Big 8 record
17	May 4	Oklahoma	Simmons Field • Columbia, Missouri	10–13	13–4	9–4
18	May 4	Oklahoma	Simmons Field • Columbia, Missouri	9–6	14–4	10–4
19	May 5	Oklahoma	Simmons Field • Columbia, Missouri	5–1	15–4	11–4
20	May 11	at Kansas State	KSU Baseball Stadium • Manhattan, Kansas	15–4	16–4	12–4
21	May 11	at Kansas State	KSU Baseball Stadium • Manhattan, Kansas	7–0	17–4	13–4
22	May 12	at Kansas State	KSU Baseball Stadium • Manhattan, Kansas	8–5	18–4	14–4
23	May 18	Oklahoma State	Unknown • Stillwater, Oklahoma	7–4	19–4	15–4
24	May 19	Oklahoma State	Unknown • Stillwater, Oklahoma	10–1	20–4	16–4
25	May 19	Oklahoma State	Unknown • Stillwater, Oklahoma	2–8	20–5	16–5

Postseason
NCAA District V Playoff (2–0)

#	Date	Opponent	Site/stadium	Score	Overall record	Big 8 record
26	June 4	Bradley	Simmons Field • Columbia, Missouri	3–1	21–5	16–5
27	June 4	Bradley	Simmons Field • Columbia, Missouri	9–4	22–5	16–5

College World Series (0–2)

#	Date	Opponent	Site/stadium	Score	Overall record	Big 8 record
28	June 11	vs Ithaca	Omaha Municipal Stadium • Omaha, Nebraska	1–5	22–6	16–5
29	June 12	vs Santa Clara	Omaha Municipal Stadium • Omaha, Nebraska	4–7	22–7	16–5

== Awards and honors ==
Larry Bohannon

- All-Big Eight Conference

George Hulett

- All-Big Eight Conference

Bobby Jenkins,

- All-Big Eight Conference

Dan Reilly

- All District V Team
- All-Big Eight Conference
