= Chicopee High School =

Public school in Massachusetts, United States

Coordinates: 42.149°N 72.5858°W

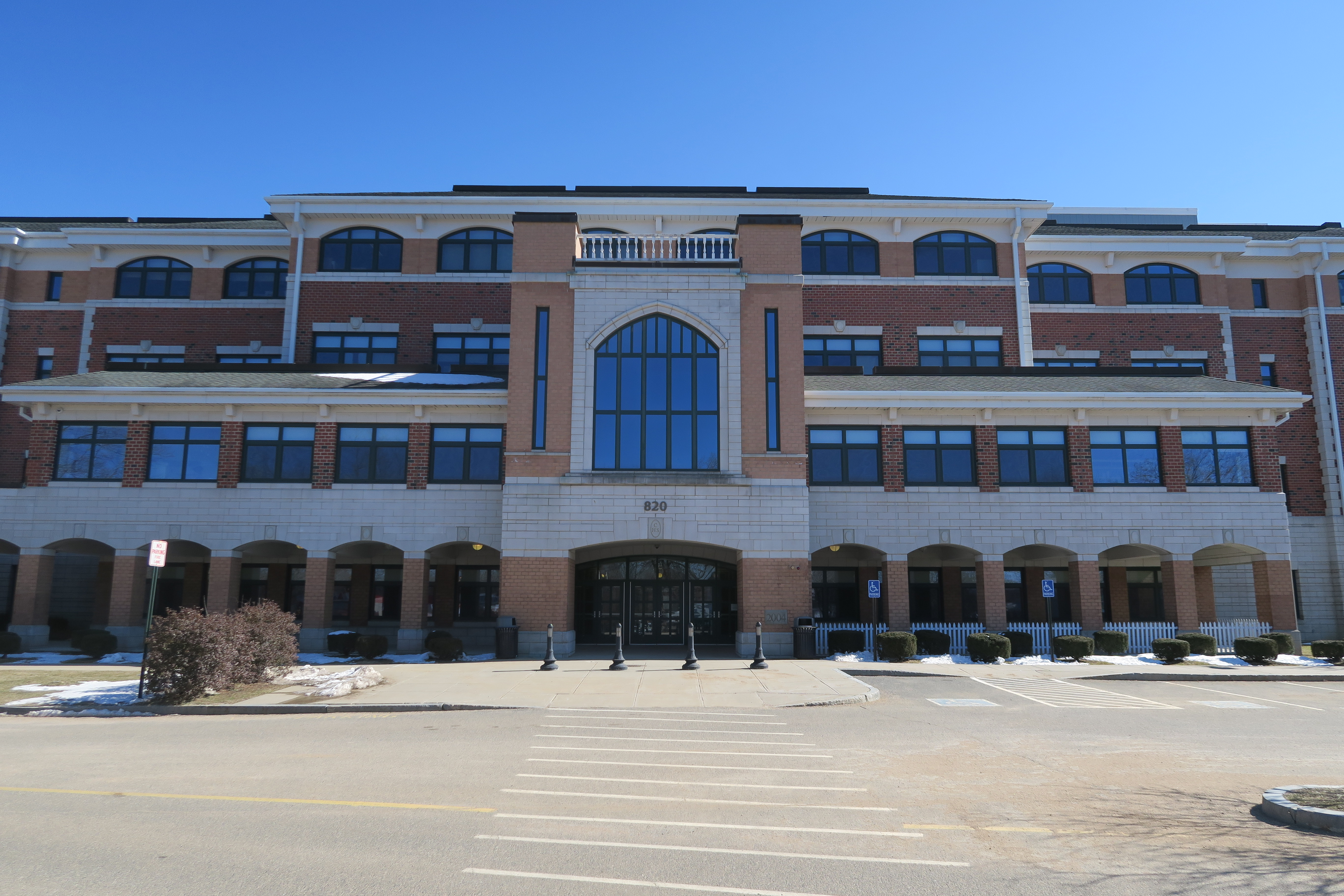
- Chicopee High School
- 820 Front Street; Chicopee, Massachusetts, 01020; United States

Information
- Type: Public; Open enrollment
- Established: 1921
- School district: Chicopee Public Schools
- Principal: Gina Fasoli Figueroa
- Grades: 9–12
- Enrollment: 932 (2023–2024)
- Colors: Maroon and gold
- Mascot: Pacer
- Rival: Holyoke High School and Chicopee Comprehensive High School
- Website: https://chs.chicopeeps.org/en-US

Chicopee High School (CHS) is a public high school located in Chicopee, Massachusetts, United States. It serves students in grades 9 through 12. Its official school colors are maroon and gold. Its mascot is the "Pacer".

== History ==
Note: Three buildings have housed Chicopee High School since its founding. Below is the history of the original two, not the current location that opened in 2004.

Construction of Chicopee High School began in 1917 to replace Central High School, which was destroyed by fire in January 1916. The new high school was built on land once occupied by the Assumption Church which itself had been destroyed by fire in 1912. Construction of the $1 million school was delayed by World War I, and CHS finally opened in September 1921. It was built in the collegiate style and faced with tapestry brick. Situated on a hill, its large front lawn featured the "keys of knowledge" outlined in shrubs. A small park and a memorial to Chicopee residents who died in World War I was constructed on an adjacent parcel.

CHS featured an auditorium that seated 1,000 people and the first gymnasium in any Chicopee school. The Chicopee Trade School occupied a wing of the new CHS. In 1957 a new gymnasium complex was added, featuring a basketball court and pool. The gym was later named after a former principal Henry B. Fay. The old gymnasium was converted into a cafeteria, the balcony of which was nicknamed "Baby Heaven" and was used for suspended students. Another location that earned an enduring nickname was "Cats Alley", a windowless hallway on the second floor that ran between the gymnasium and the auditorium.

=== Athletics ===
Chicopee High School teams are known as the "Pacers".

- Baseball State Champions – 1961, 1962, 1963
- Football WM Champions – 1975

== Notable alumni ==
- Phyllis St. Pierre, an actress known for Son of Sinbad and The French Line
- Bill Budness ('60), former professional American football player who played linebacker for seven seasons for the Oakland Raiders
- Al Stanek ('62), former professional baseball pitcher who played five seasons with the San Francisco Giants
- Garry St. Jean ('68), former professional basketball coach and executive for four different NBA teams over twenty seasons
- Cynthia Kieras Phillips ('72), American physicist known for her work on plasma and magnetic confinement fusion
- Ken Maiuri, composer and keyboardist for The B-52s
- Sabina Gadecki ('01), actress and model, known for roles in Entourage and Narcos
