= 1962 Holy Cross Crusaders baseball team =

Baseball team representing College of Holy Cross

1962 Holy Cross Crusaders baseball

District I champions

College World Series, T-6th
- Conference: Independent
- Record: 21–5
- Head coach: Albert Riopel (2nd season)
- Home stadium: Fitton Field

The 1962 Holy Cross Crusaders baseball team represented the College of the Holy Cross in the 1962 NCAA University Division baseball season. The Crusaders played their home games at Fitton Field. The team was coached by Albert Riopel in his 2nd year as head coach at Holy Cross.

The Crusaders won the District I playoff to advance to the College World Series, where they were defeated by the Santa Clara Broncos.

== Roster ==
1962 Holy Cross Crusaders baseball team
Players
Coaches

#	Pos.	Name	B/T	Height	Weight	Year	Home town
	INF	Bob Arena	/	—	—
		John Burke	/	—	—
	OF	Tony Capo	/	5 ft 7 in (1.7 m)	—
		Patrick Connors	/	—	—
		Hank Cutting	/	—	—
		Pat Gallager	/R	—	—
		Michael Henighan	/	—	—
9	C	Dave Holborn	/	—	—
		Jim Holloran	/R	—	—	So
		Tom Jordan	/	—	—	So
		Joseph Killion	/	—	—
		Paul Morano	/	—	—
	C	Jim Murphy	/	—	—
19	INF	John Peterman	/R	—	—	Jr
		William Prizio	/R	—	—
	P	Don Riedl	/	—	—	Jr	Worcester, Massachusetts
	P	Mike Skane	/LHL	—	—	So
	OF	Tommy Smith (C)	/R	—	—
	INF	Al Snyder	/	—	—
	P	Paul Symeon	/	—	—
		Joseph Trombly	/	—	—
	INF	Barry Tyne	/L	—	—
		Edward Widronak	/R	—	—

Head coach

Albert Riopel

Assistant coach(es)

Legend

- (C) Team captain
- (S) Suspended
- (I) Ineligible
- Injured
- Current redshirt

Roster
Last update: October 2, 2021

== Schedule ==
1962 Holy Cross Crusaders baseball game log
Regular season
April (4–1)

#	Date	Opponent	Site/stadium	Score	Overall record
1	April	Boston University	Unknown • Unknown	18–0	1–0
2	April	Williams	Unknown • Unknown	4–2	2–0
3	April	AIC	Unknown • Unknown	6–4	2–0
4	April 26	Dartmouth	Fitton Field • Worcester, Massachusetts	6–1	4–0
5	April 28	Ithaca	Fitton Field • Worcester, Massachusetts	6–7	4–1

May (10–2)

#	Date	Opponent	Site/stadium	Score	Overall record
6	May	Providence	Unknown • Unknown	6–5	5–1
7	May 4	Seton Hall	Unknown • Unknown	2–8	5–2
8	May	Brown	Unknown • Unknown	11–4	6–2
9	May 8	UMass	Fitton Field • Worcester, Massachusetts	3–2	7–2
10	May	Providence	Unknown • Unknown	11–3	8–2
11	May	Northeastern	Unknown • Unknown	10–9	9–2
12	May 16	Harvard	Fitton Field • Worcester, Massachusetts	7–4	10–2
13	May 19	at Dartmouth	Red Rolfe Field • Hanover, New Hampshire	14–4	11–2
14	May	Worcester Tech	Unknown • Unknown	20–0	12–2
15	May 26	Springfield	Fitton Field • Worcester, Massachusetts	15–7	13–2
16	May 30	Boston College	Fitton Field • Worcester, Massachusetts	4–9	13–3
17	May 31	Amherst	Unknown • Unknown	8–7	14–3

June (3–0)

#	Date	Opponent	Site/stadium	Score	Overall record
18	June 1	Yale	Unknown • Unknown	15–5	15–3
19	June 2	at Boston College	John Shea Field • Chestnut Hill, Massachusetts	10–1	16–3

Postseason
District I Playoff (3–0)

#	Date	Opponent	Site/stadium	Score	Overall record
20	June	vs Vermont	Unknown • Springfield, Massachusetts	7–5	17–3
21	June	vs Bridgeport	Unknown • Springfield, Massachusetts	5–2	18–3
22	June	vs Vermont	Unknown • Springfield, Massachusetts	12–5	19–3

June (1–0)

#	Date	Opponent	Site/stadium	Score	Overall record
23	June 9	Boston College	Fitton Field • Worcester, Massachusetts	4–2	20–3

College World Series (1–2)

#	Date	Opponent	Site/stadium	Score	Overall record
24	June 11	vs Colorado State College	Omaha Municipal Stadium • Omaha, Nebraska	4–3	21–3
25	June 12	vs Michigan	Omaha Municipal Stadium • Omaha, Nebraska	4–11	21–4
26	June 13	vs Santa Clara	Omaha Municipal Stadium • Omaha, Nebraska	7–12	21–5
