= 1962 Texas Longhorns baseball team =

American college baseball season

1962 Texas Longhorns baseball

SWC champions

College World Series, 3–2
- Conference: Southwest Conference
- Record: 26–7 (12–2 SWC)
- Head coach: Bibb Falk (20th year)
- Home stadium: Clark Field

1962 Southwest Conference baseball standings
	Conf.				Overall
Team	W		L	PCT	W		L	PCT
No. 3 Texas ‍†‍‍^{y}	12	–	2	.857	26	–	7	.788
No. 18 Texas A&M ‍‍‍	11	–	4	.733	18	–	7	.720
Baylor ‍‍‍	9	–	5	.643	17	–	7	.708
TCU ‍‍‍	6	–	9	.400	12	–	11	.522
Rice ‍‍‍	4	–	9	.308	10	–	12	.455
SMU ‍‍‍	0	–	13	.000	0	–	21	.000
† – Conference champion y – Invited to the NCAA tournament As of June 30, 1962; Rankings from Collegiate Baseball

The 1962 Texas Longhorns baseball team represented the University of Texas at Austin in the 1962 NCAA University Division baseball season. The Longhorns played their home games at Clark Field. The team was coached by Bibb Falk in his 20th season at Texas.

The Longhorns reached the College World Series, finishing third with losses to eventual champion Michigan and runner-up Santa Clara.

== Personnel ==
=== Roster ===
1962 Texas Longhorns roster
Pitchers: - Tim Belcher; Catchers: - Gary E London; Manager: - Ralph Werner Knebel	Infielders: - Bill Bethea; - Pat Rigby; Outfielders: - Chuck Knutson	Unknown: - Tim Allen; - Lewis E. Brazelton; - Charles O. Hartenstein; - Edward E. Kasper; - Robert Willis Myer Jr.; - Walter New; - David C. Nunnenkamp; - John M. Pinckney; - David Tyler Skinner; - Michael Emmett Thrash

== Schedule and results ==
Legend
Texas win
Texas loss
Tie

1962 Texas Longhorns baseball game log
Regular season

March
Date	Opponent	Site/stadium	Score	Overall record	SWC record
Mar 5	Sam Houston State Teachers College*	Clark Field • Austin, TX	W 5–4	1–0	
Mar 6	Sam Houston State Teachers College*	Clark Field • Austin, TX	L 5–16^{7}	1–1	
Mar 9	Oklahoma*	Clark Field • Austin, TX	W 10–0	2–1	
Mar 10	Oklahoma*	Clark Field • Austin, TX	W 19–7	3–1	
Mar 13	Texas Lutheran*	Clark Field • Austin, TX	W 19–2	4–1	
Mar 17	at Baylor	Waco, TX	W 4–3	5–1	1–0
Mar 19	Minnesota*	Clark Field • Austin, TX	L 7–8	5–2	
Mar 20	Minnesota*	Clark Field • Austin, TX	L 3–5^{10}	5–3	
Mar 24	Rice	Clark Field • Austin, TX	W 11–4	6–3	2–0
Mar 27	St. Mary's (TX)*	Clark Field • Austin, TX	W 11–3	7–3	
Mar 31	at Texas A&M	Kyle Baseball Field • College Station, TX	L 3–4	7–4	2–1

April
Date	Opponent	Site/stadium	Score	Overall record	SWC record
Apr 4	TCU	Clark Field • Austin, TX	W 9–7	8–4	3–1
Apr 12	at Rice	Houston, TX	W 6–9	9–4	4–1
Apr 13	at Rice	Houston, TX	L 6–9	9–5	4–2
Apr 16	Baylor	Clark Field • Austin, TX	W 8–0	10–5	5–2
Apr 17	Baylor	Clark Field • Austin, TX	W 12–1	11–5	6–2
Apr 27	SMU	Clark Field • Austin, TX	W 2–0	12–5	7–2
Apr 28	SMU	Clark Field • Austin, TX	W 4–3	13–5	8–2

May
Date	Opponent	Site/stadium	Score	Overall record	SWC record
May 2	at TCU	TCU Diamond • Fort Worth, TX	W 4–3	14–5	9–2
May 3	at TCU	TCU Diamond • Fort Worth, TX	W 7–3	15–5	10–2
May 9	Texas A&M	Clark Field • Austin, TX	W 4–3	16–5	11–2
May 10	Texas A&M	Clark Field • Austin, TX	W 11–10^{10}	17–5	12–2

Postseason

District 6 playoffs
Date	Opponent	Site/stadium	Score	Overall record	Playoff record
May 17	at Arizona	Tucson, AZ	W 1–0	18–5	1–0
May 18	at Arizona	Tucson, AZ	W 7–4	19–5	2–0

Exhibitions
Date	Opponent	Site/stadium	Score	Overall record
May 19	at Arizona	Tucson, AZ	W 4–3	20–5
June 4	SMI Steelers	Clark Field • Austin, TX	W 6–2	21–5
June 6	SMI Steelers	Clark Field • Austin, TX	W 3–0	22–5
June 7	at LeGrange Demons		W 7–4	23–5

College World Series
Date	Opponent	Site/stadium	Score	Overall record	CWS record
June 11	Michigan	Johnny Rosenblatt Stadium • Omaha, NE	L 1–3	23–6	0–1
June 12	Colorado State College	Johnny Rosenblatt Stadium • Omaha, NE	W 12–2	24–6	1–1
June 13	Ithaca	Johnny Rosenblatt Stadium • Omaha, NE	W 3–2	25–6	2–1
June 14	Michigan	Johnny Rosenblatt Stadium • Omaha, NE	W 7–0	26–6	3–1
June 13	Santa Clara	Johnny Rosenblatt Stadium • Omaha, NE	L 3–4^{10}	26–7	3–2
