= 1962 West Virginia Mountaineers baseball team =

American college baseball season

1962 West Virginia Mountaineers baseball

Southern Conference Champions

NCAA District 3 Regionals, 0-2
- Conference: Southern Conference

Ranking
- Coaches: No. 20
- Record: 17-9 (9-2 SoCon)
- Head coach: Steve Harrick (15th season)
- Home stadium: Hawley Field

1962 Southern Conference baseball standings
	Conf.				Overall
Team	W		L	PCT	W		L	PCT
No. 20 West Virginia ‍†‍‍^{y}	9	–	2	.818	19	–	8	.704
Richmond ‍‍‍	8	–	3	.727	12	–	5	.706
Furman ‍‍‍	6	–	3	.667	12	–	9	.571
Virginia Tech ‍‍‍	7	–	5	.583	11	–	6	.647
VMI ‍‍‍	7	–	7	.500	8	–	7	.533
George Washington ‍‍‍	4	–	6	.400	8	–	7	.533
Davidson ‍‍‍	3	–	7	.300	8	–	16	.333
The Citadel ‍‍‍	3	–	7	.300	10	–	13	.435
William & Mary ‍‍‍	3	–	10	.231	4	–	12	.250
† – Conference champion y – Invited to the NCAA Tournament; As of June 30, 1962; Rankings from Collegiate Baseball

The 1962 West Virginia Mountaineers baseball team represented West Virginia University during the 1962 NCAA University Division baseball season. The Mountaineers played their home games at Hawley Field as a member of the Southern Conference. They were led by head coach Steve Harrick, in his 15th season at West Virginia. They would finish the season 17-9, winning the Southern Conference championship and playing in the NCAA District 3 Regionals losing to Florida State.
