= 1962 Ithaca Bombers baseball team =

American college baseball season

1962 Ithaca Bombers baseball

College World Series, T–5th
- Conference: Independent
- Record: 18–2
- Head coach: Bucky Freeman (31st season)
- Captains: Bob Christina; Bob Valesente
- Home stadium: South Hill Diamond

The 1962 Ithaca Bombers baseball team represented Ithaca College in the 1962 NCAA University Division baseball season. The head coach was Bucky Freeman, serving his 31st year. The Bombers completed an undefeated regular season, and got 5th place in the 1962 College World Series.

== Roster ==
1962 Ithaca Bombers baseball team
Players
Coaches

#	Pos.	Name	B/T	Height	Weight	Year	Home town
	INF	Jim Baker	/	—	—
		P Bieron	/	—	—
	P	Bob Bleadow	/	—	—	Sr
		M Castagnola	/	—	—
		Bob Christina	/	—	—
		B Croal	/	—	—
		C Croll	/	—	—
	LHP	Bill Darling	/L	—	—	Sr
	RHP	Tom DePatto	/R	—	—	So
		D Donlick	/	—	—
	OF	Ed Farquhar	/	—	—	So
	INF	Don Fazio	R/R	5 ft 8 in (1.73 m)	175 lb (79 kg)		Watertown, New York
	RHP	Roger Freize	/R	—	—	Jr	Binghamton, New York
		P Kelly	/	—	—
		R Lembo	/	—	—
	P	Dick Lindamer	/	—	—	So
		Skip Lyne	/	—	—
		G Monje	/	—	—
		Billy Odell	/	—	—	Sr
		T Olvert	/	—	—
	C	Dick Rockwell	/	—	—	Jr	Waverly, New York
		J Thomas	/	—	—
	INF	Tom Terranova	/	—	—
	OF	Bob Valesente (C)	R/R	5 ft 11 in (1.8 m)	175 lb (79 kg)	Sr	Seneca Falls, New York
	LHP	Frank Vandeweghe	/L	—	—
		T Vogt	/	—	—

Head coach

Bucky Freeman

Assistant coach(es)

Legend

- (C) Team captain
- (S) Suspended
- (I) Ineligible
- Injured
- Current redshirt

== Schedule ==
1962 Ithaca Bombers baseball game log
Regular season
April (7–0)

#	Date	Opponent	Site/stadium	Score	Overall record
1	April 10	at Penn State	Unknown • University Park, Pennsylvania	14–5	1–0
2	April 12	at C. W. Post	Unknown • Brookville, New York	5–2	2–0
3	April 14	at Fairleigh Dickinson	Unknown • Teaneck, New Jersey	7–2	3–0
4	April 21	RIT	South Hill Diamond • Ithaca, New York	28–4	4–0
5		Colgate	Unknown • Unknown	11–5	5–0
6	April 27	at Hartford	Unknown • West Hartford, Connecticut	20–8	6–0
7	April 28	at Holy Cross	Fitton Field • Worcester, Massachusetts	7–6	7–0

May (8–0)

#	Date	Opponent	Site/stadium	Score	Overall record
8	May 5	Hartwick	South Hill Diamond • Ithaca, New York	16–1	8–0
9	May 10	at Hartwick	Unknown • Oneonta, New York	21–0	9–0
10	May 13	Canisius	Unknown • Unknown	11–5	10–0
11	May 13	Canisius	Unknown • Unknown	8–0	11–0
12		St. Lawrence	Unknown • Unknown	3–0	12–0
13		C. W. Post	Unknown • Unknown	14–3	13–0
14		Buffalo	Unknown • Unknown	8–3	14–0
15		Army	Unknown • Unknown	4–0	15–0

Postseason
District 2 Tournament (2–0)

#	Date	Opponent	Site/stadium	Score	Overall record
16		vs Penn State	Unknown • University Park, Pennsylvania	7–6	16–0
17		Gettysburg	Unknown • University Park, Pennsylvania	7–4	17–0

1962 College World Series (1–2)

#	Date	Opponent	Site/stadium	Score	Overall record
18	June 11	vs Missouri	Omaha Municipal Stadium • Omaha, Nebraska	5–1	18–0
19	June 12	vs Florida State	Omaha Municipal Stadium • Omaha, Nebraska	4–5	18–1
20	June 13	vs Texas	Omaha Municipal Stadium • Omaha, Nebraska	2–3	18–2
