= Jackson Field (Greeley) =

Baseball field based in Colorado

- The Jack
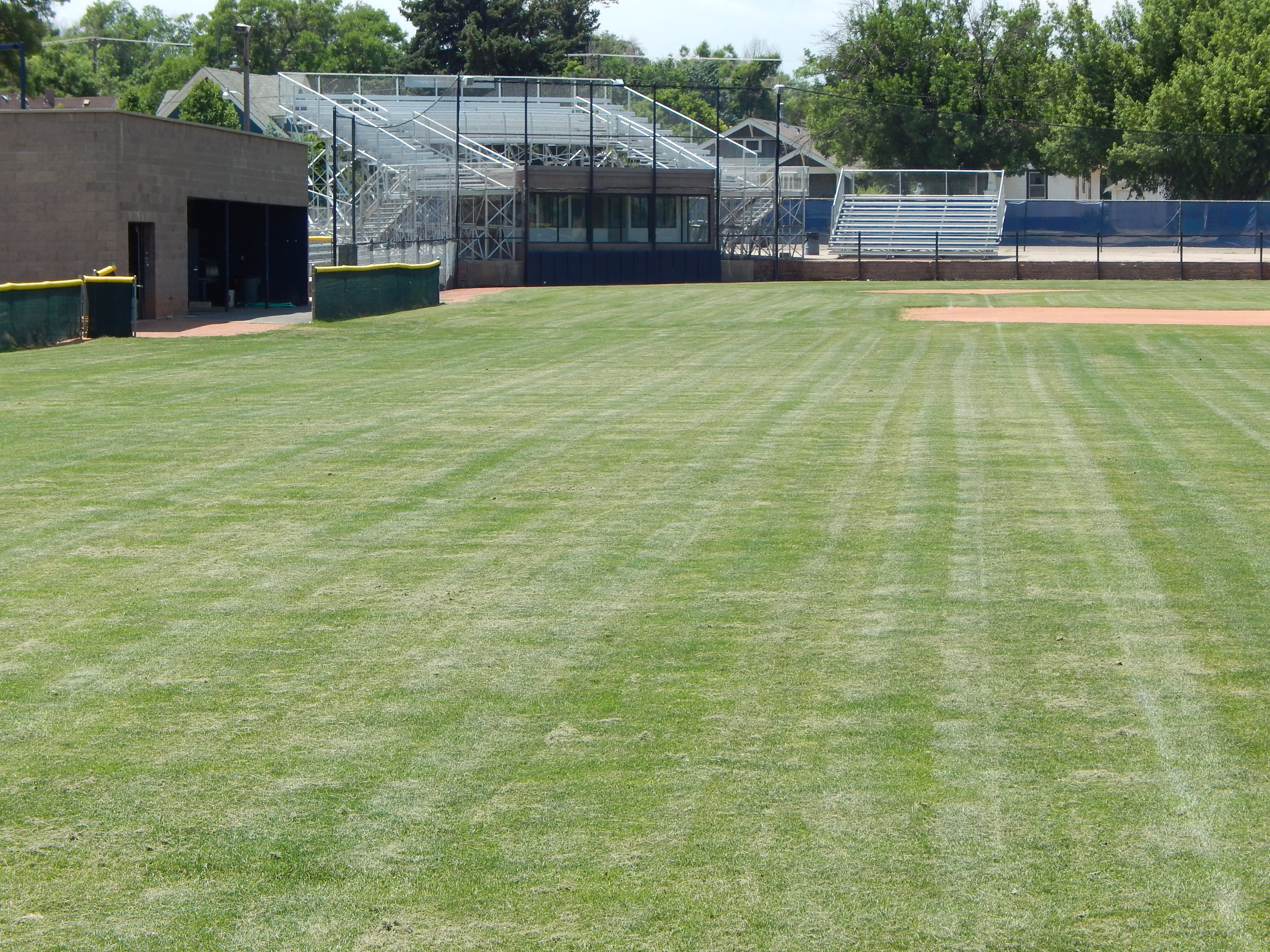
- Interactive map of Jackson Field
- Full name: Jackson Field Sports Complex
- Location: 1850 6th Ave. Greeley, CO, 80639
- Coordinates: 40.408801°N 104.686968°W
- Owner: University of Northern Colorado
- Operator: University of Northern Colorado
- Capacity: 1,500
- Surface: Grass
- Scoreboard: Electronic
- Field size: Left Field: 349 feet (106 m); Center Field: 416 feet (127 m); Right Field: 356 feet (109 m)

Construction
- Opened: 1927

Tenant
- Northern Colorado Bears baseball (NCAA D-I Summit) (1952–present)

Jackson Field is a baseball venue in Greeley, Colorado, United States. It is home to the Northern Colorado Bears baseball team of the NCAA Division I Summit League. The facility has a capacity of 1,500 spectators. The field was dedicated in 1952 in honor of Charles N. Jackson, a UNC trustee who helped purchase the land in 1927.

== Features ==
The field's features include a grass playing surface, a press box, an electronic scoreboard, dugouts, a padded backstop, restrooms, and concessions truck. In the summer of 2019, the field saw a new scoreboard installed as well as batting cages.

== See also ==
- List of NCAA Division I baseball venues
