= Pete Magrini =

American baseball player (1942–2022)

- Pitcher
- Born: June 8, 1942; San Francisco, California, U.S.
- Died: October 27, 2022 (aged 80); Santa Rosa, California, U.S.
- Batted: Right Threw: Right

MLB debut
- April 13, 1966, for the Boston Red Sox

Last MLB appearance
- May 9, 1966, for the Boston Red Sox

MLB statistics
- Win–loss record: 0–1
- Earned run average: 9.82
- Innings pitched: 7⅓
- Stats at Baseball Reference

Teams
- Boston Red Sox (1966)

Peter Alexander Magrini (June 8, 1942 – October 27, 2022) was an American right-handed pitcher in Major League Baseball who played for the 1966 Boston Red Sox. The 6 ft (1.8 m), 195 lb (88 kg) Magrini attended Santa Clara University, where he struck out Willie Mays during an exhibition game against the San Francisco Giants.

He was signed as an amateur by the Minnesota Twins in 1964 and was drafted by Boston that November. After a stellar 18–8 record and a 2.26 earned run average in the 1965 Double-A Eastern League, Magrini made his Major League debut for the Red Sox on April 13, 1966 against the Baltimore Orioles, going two innings and giving up two hits, two bases on balls and three earned runs. He made his only MLB start in his final game May 9 against the Kansas City Athletics but lasted only three innings and lost his only big-league decision, 6–1.

However, Magrini contributed to Boston's surprise 1967 American League pennant when he was traded with fellow pitcher Ron Klimkowski to the New York Yankees for veteran catcher Elston Howard on August 3, 1967. Howard helped guide the young Red Sox pitching staff through a five-team pennant scramble and the 1967 World Series.

Magrini retired from baseball after the 1969 minor league season and lived in Santa Rosa, California. He died from cancer on October 27, 2022.
