= Fritz Fisher =

American baseball player (born 1941)

- Pitcher
- Born: November 28, 1941 (age 84); Adrian, Michigan
- Batted: Left Threw: Left

MLB debut
- April 19, 1964, for the Detroit Tigers

Last MLB appearance
- April 19, 1964, for the Detroit Tigers

MLB statistics
- Win–loss record: 0–0
- Earned run average: 108.00
- Strikeouts: 1
- Innings pitched: 0 1/3
- Stats at Baseball Reference

Teams
- Detroit Tigers (1964)

Frederick Brown "Fritz" Fisher (born November 28, 1941) is an American former professional baseball player. A left-handed pitcher who attended the University of Michigan (where he compiled a 21–9 record, including a 9–1 mark in his senior year in 1962), Fisher played five years in minor league baseball and was a standout at the Double-A level, but in his only Major League appearance, in April 1964 for the Detroit Tigers, he was treated roughly and gained only one out. In one-third of an inning, Fisher yielded two hits, four earned runs and two bases on balls.

Fisher was listed at 6 feet 1 inch (1.85 m) tall and 180 pounds (82 kg). After a successful professional debut with the Double-A Knoxville Smokies and impressing manager Chuck Dressen during workouts in 1963, Fisher was added to the Tigers' 40-man spring training roster for 1964. He was kept on the team's early-season 28-man squad. During Detroit's fourth game of the American League campaign, on April 19 at Tiger Stadium, Fisher made his debut in relief the ninth inning with the Tigers trailing the Minnesota Twins, 8–3. The first batter he faced was a future Hall of Famer, Harmon Killebrew, and Fisher struck him out. But that was the only out he recorded; he walked the next two batters and gave up run-scoring hits to Ali Khan, Joel Woods, Jerry Zimmerman and Camilo Pascual before being relieved by Ed Rakow, who allowed the inherited runners to score.

Fisher spent the rest of 1964 with Knoxville and the Triple-A Syracuse Chiefs, and he retired after the 1967 season, never returning to the Majors. His minor league record of 44 wins and 25 defeats and a 3.05 earned run average in 103 games included a 33–15 (2.66) mark at the Double-A level.
