= Bob Garibaldi =

American baseball player (1942–2023)

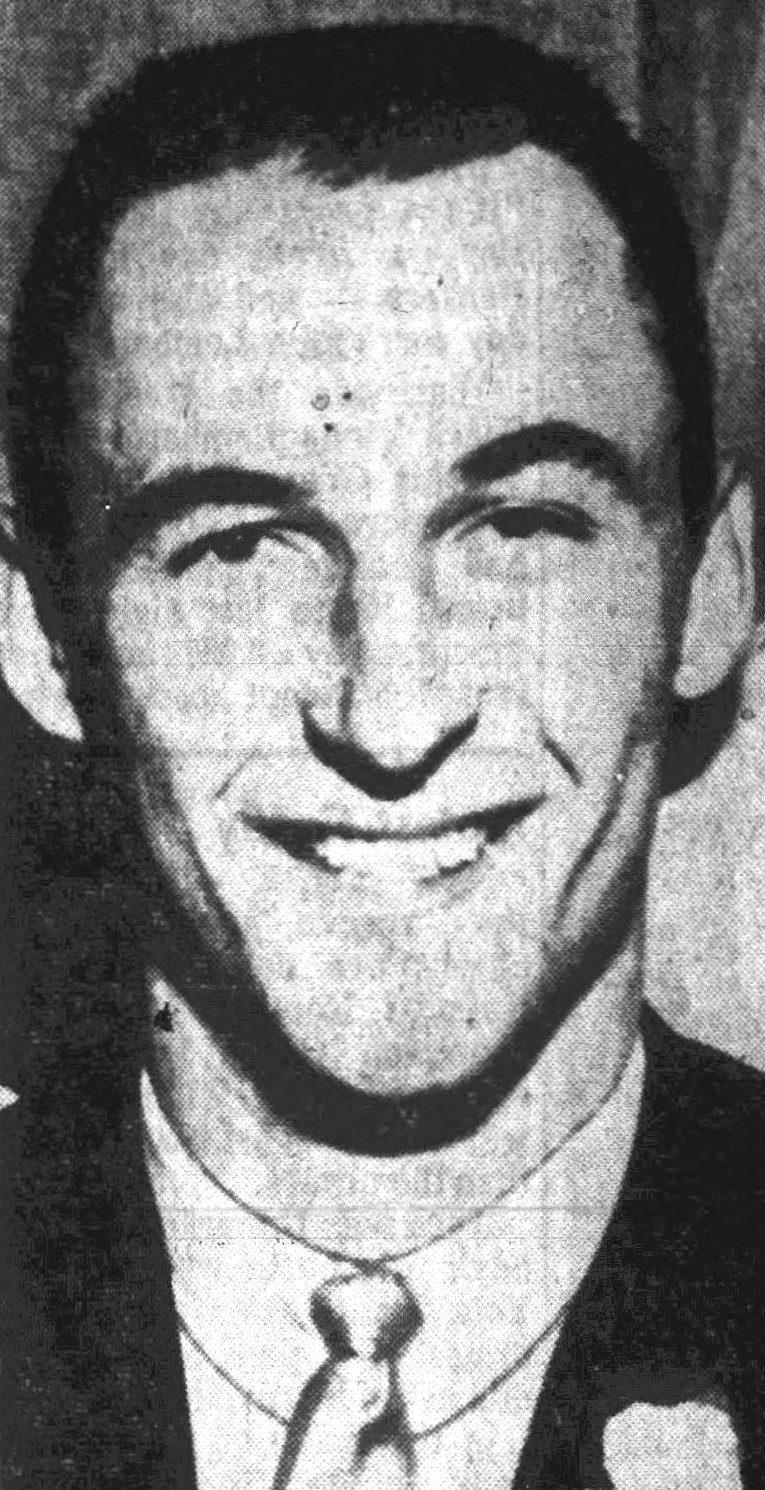
- Garibaldi, circa 1962
- Pitcher
- Born: March 3, 1942; Stockton, California, U.S.
- Died: May 13, 2023 (aged 81); Stockton, California, U.S.
- Batted: Left Threw: Right

MLB debut
- July 15, 1962, for the San Francisco Giants

Last MLB appearance
- October 1, 1969, for the San Francisco Giants

MLB statistics
- Win–loss record: 0–2
- Earned run average: 3.08
- Strikeouts: 14
- Stats at Baseball Reference

Teams
- San Francisco Giants (1962–1963, 1966, 1969); College World Series Most Outstanding Player (1962)

Robert Roy Garibaldi (March 3, 1942 – May 13, 2023) was an American professional baseball player. He appeared as a pitcher in the major leagues with the San Francisco Giants during four seasons in the 1960s. He batted left-handed, threw right-handed, and was listed at 210 pounds (95 kg) and 6 feet 4 inches (1.93 m).

== Biography ==
Garibaldi was born in 1942 in Stockton, California, and attended Stagg High School and then the Santa Clara University, with whom he won the Most Outstanding Player award for the 1962 College World Series. He remains the only player from Santa Clara University to win that award. He also set two College World Series records: strikeouts (38) and innings pitched (27 2/3).

Although Casey Stengel of the New York Mets tried to convince Garibaldi to sign with them—Stengel even left a game at Candlestick Park early to travel to Stockton to try to persuade him—Garibaldi chose not to sign with the Mets. Instead, he signed with the San Francisco Giants. After signing with the Giants for a record bonus of $150,000 ($1.6 million in 2025), Garibaldi jumped straight from college to the major leagues, making his big league debut on July 15, 1962. He pitched in relief in nine games that season, going 0–0 with a 5.11 earned run average (ERA). He was the ninth-youngest major-league player in 1962.

Entering the 1963 season, under the terms of the bonus rule as then in place, a team could send one "bonus rookie" to the minor leagues without exposing that player to being signed by another team. The Giants demoted Garibaldi while keeping fellow rookie pitcher Al Stanek with the big league team. Garibaldi was upset with Giants manager Alvin Dark, who explained that the team wanted Garibaldi to start, but the Giants already had a full rotation. After starting 30 games in the minors, Garibaldi was a September call-up with the Giants, where he went 0–1 with a 1.13 ERA in four relief appearances.

Garibaldi did not pitch in the majors again until 1966. That season, he appeared in one major-league game, pitching a scoreless inning, allowing a single hit. He'd have to wait until 1969 to play in the big leagues again, once again appearing in only one game. Making the only start of his career, he pitched five solid innings and allowed just one earned run, but took the loss as his defense allowed three unearned runs. That proved to be his final major-league appearance.

While pitching for the Giants' Triple-A teams in Tacoma and Phoenix between 1963 and 1970, Garibaldi recorded a record of 85–69, with a high of 15 wins in 1970. He tied for the Pacific Coast League (PCL) lead in wins, with 13, in 1969, and led the PCL in complete games with 17 in 1969, and 20 in 1970. He was named a pitcher on the National Association All-Star Fielding Silver Glove team by The Sporting News for the 1969 season. He was a player-manager for the Phoenix Giants in 1970.

Garibaldi was traded to the Kansas City Royals organization on October 19, 1970, for catcher Fran Healy. In mid-April 1971, he was traded to the San Diego Padres organization for pitcher Mike Jackson. Garibaldi played for the Padres top farm team, the Hawaii Islanders, in 1971 and 1972 before retiring.

Overall, Garibaldi went 0–2 with a 3.08 ERA in the major leagues. In 15 appearances, he recorded 11 walks and 14 strikeouts. Garibaldi was the last $100,000 "bonus baby" pitcher who did not win a major-league game.

After his baseball career, Garibaldi worked in beverage distribution, and was a college basketball referee for many years. He died in 2023; he was survived by his wife and three children.

== See also ==
- List of baseball players who went directly to Major League Baseball
