= Don Lund =

American baseball player (1923–2013)

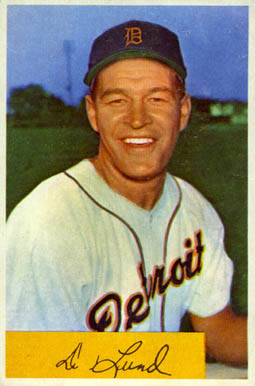
- Outfielder / Coach
- Born: May 18, 1923; Detroit, Michigan, U.S.
- Died: December 10, 2013 (aged 90); Ann Arbor, Michigan, U.S.
- Batted: Right Threw: Right

MLB debut
- July 3, 1945, for the Brooklyn Dodgers

Last MLB appearance
- July 29, 1954, for the Detroit Tigers

MLB statistics
- Batting average: .240
- Home runs: 15
- Runs batted in: 86
- Stats at Baseball Reference

Teams
- As player: Brooklyn Dodgers (1945, 1947–1948); St. Louis Browns (1948); Detroit Tigers (1949, 1952–1954); As coach: Detroit Tigers (1957–1958)

Donald Andrew Lund (May 18, 1923 – December 10, 2013) was an American professional baseball outfielder who played in Major League Baseball for the Brooklyn Dodgers (1945, 1947–1948), St. Louis Browns (1948) and Detroit Tigers (1949, 1952–1954). He batted and threw right-handed.

Born in Detroit, Michigan, Lund graduated from Detroit Southeastern High School and then attended the University of Michigan where he lettered in baseball, football and basketball. He was signed out of the University of Michigan by the Brooklyn Dodgers in 1945. Although drafted in the 1st round of the NFL draft in 1945 by the Chicago Bears as a running back, Lund felt baseball would be the better career choice. Used mainly as a reserve, he played part of three seasons with the Dodgers and St. Louis Browns between 1945 and 1948. His most productive season came in 1953 as the regular right fielder for the Detroit Tigers, when he posted career-highs in batting average (.257), home runs (nine), runs batted in (47), hits (108), at-bats (421), doubles (21), triples (four), and games played (131). On June 18, 1953, Lund made the final put-out in right field when Boston scored an MLB record 17 runs against the Tigers in one inning. He played his last season in 1954 as a backup for teenager rookie Al Kaline.

In a seven-season career, Lund was a .240 hitter with 15 home runs and 86 RBI in 281 games.

Following his major league career, Lund served as head baseball coach at the University of Michigan. Under his leadership, the Wolverines won the College World Series in 1962. He also coached for the Tigers and was director of their farm system from 1963 through 1970.

Lund was inducted into the Michigan Hall of Honor in 1984 for his significant contributions as a football, baseball, and basketball player and baseball coach as well. Lund was inducted into the Michigan Sports Hall of Fame in 1987.

In 2009, James Robert Irwin wrote a book about the life of Don Lund, "Playing Ball with Legends: The Story and the Stories of Don Lund."

He died on December 10, 2013, at the age of 90 at his home in Ann Arbor, Michigan.

== See also ==
- University of Michigan Athletic Hall of Honor
