= Northern Colorado Bears baseball =

American college baseball team

Northern Colorado Bears
- 2026 Northern Colorado Bears baseball team
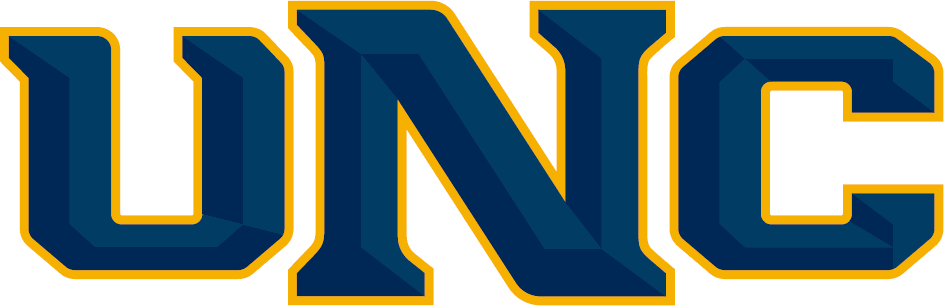
- Founded: 1924
- University: University of Northern Colorado
- Head coach: Mike Anderson (4th season)
- Conference: Summit League
- Location: Greeley, Colorado
- Home stadium: Jackson Field (Capacity: 1,500)
- Nickname: Bears
- Colors: Blue and gold

College World Series appearances
- 1952, 1953, 1955, 1957, 1958, 1959, 1960, 1961, 1962, 1974

NCAA tournament appearances
- Division II: 1994, 1998; Division I: 1974, 1975, 1976; College Division: 1971, 1972, 1973; No Divisions: 1949, 1952, 1953, 1954, 1955, 1956, 1957, 1958, 1959, 1960, 1961, 1962, 1963, 1964, 1965, 1966, 1968

Conference tournament champions
- NCC: 1998; GPAC: 1973, 1974, 1975, 1976; RMC: 1971, 1972

Conference regular season champions
- GWC: 2013; NCC: 1998; GPAC: 1973, 1974, 1975, 1976; RMC: 1954, 1955, 1956, 1957, 1958, 1959, 1960, 1961, 1962, 1963, 1964, 1965, 1966, 1967, 1968, 1971, 1972

Northern Colorado Bears baseball is the varsity intercollegiate team representing University of Northern Colorado in the sport of college baseball in NCAA Division I. The team is led by Mike Anderson, and plays its home games at Jackson Field on campus in Greeley, Colorado. The Bears are baseball members of the Summit League, having joined in July 2021 after spending the previous eight years as baseball members of the Western Athletic Conference.

Prior to the 1968 establishment of what is now the NCAA Division II baseball tournament, the Bears reached the College World Series nine times, and reached the CWS again in 1974 at the Division I level for a total of ten appearances, compiling a record of 3–20. The school was known as Colorado State College until 1970, when the school changed to its present name. This is not to be confused with the current Colorado State University, which was known as Colorado A&M until 1957.

== Venue ==
The Bears play baseball home games at Jackson Field, which holds 1,500. Jackson Field has hosted NCAA regionals in 1952, 1955, 1957, 1959, 1962 and 1974.

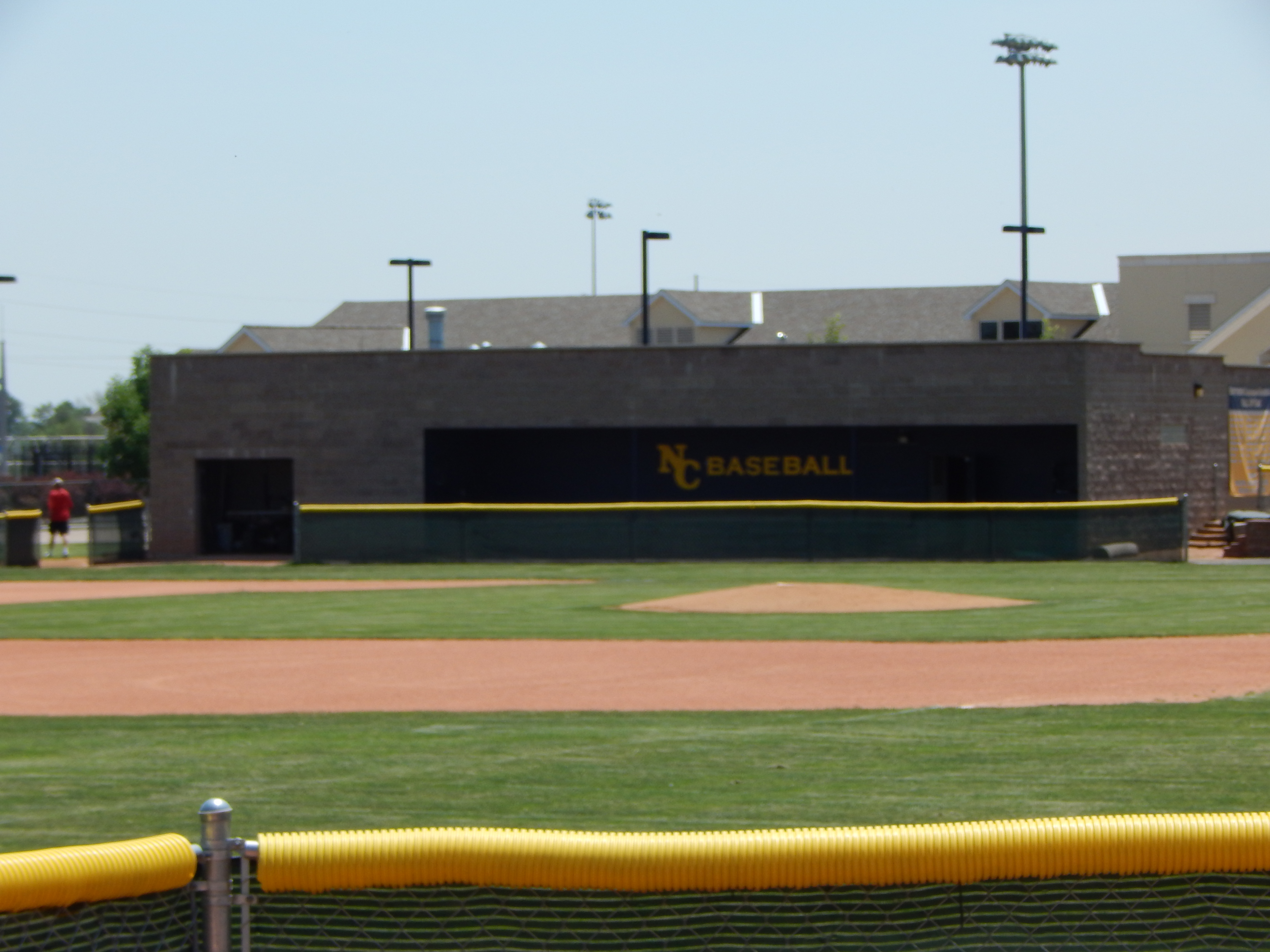
The Bears home dugout at Jackson Field, July 2015

== History ==
Northern Colorado first fielded a baseball team from 1924 to 1942, taking a break during World War II and returned to play in 1945, under Pete Butler, who returned to his post as head coach after serving in the United States Navy.

After playing as a Division I Independent following their return to Division I play in 2004, the Bears joined the Great West Conference for the 2010 season. The Bears captured the 2013 regular season Great West Conference championship, their first conference championship since 1998. When the Great West League became defunct, the Bears joined the Western Athletic Conference (WAC).

Following the 2021 season, the Bears announced they would join the Summit League to help control costs.

== Head coaches ==
- Records are through June 28, 2024

| Tenure | Coach | Years | Record | Pct. |
|---|---|---|---|---|
| 1924–1927 | George E. Cooper | 4 | 13–9–1 | .587 |
| 1928–1929 | George Cooper/Pete Brown | 2 | 6–3 | .667 |
| 1930–1940 | Pete Brown | 11 | 54–58 | .482 |
| 1941–1942, 1945–1967 | Pete Butler | 25 | 417–153–2 | .731 |
| 1943–1944 | World War II – No Team | | | |
| 1968–1970 | Thurman Wright | 3 | 43–35–1 | .551 |
| 1971–1985 | Tom Petroff | 15 | 367–198–1 | .649 |
| 1986–1990 | John Barnes | 5 | 90–133 | .404 |
| 1991–2002 | Terry Hensley | 12 | 289–284 | .504 |
| 2003–2010 | Kevin Smallcomb | 8 | 195–235 | .453 |
| 2011–2022 | Carl Iwasaki | 12 | 218–375 | .368 |
| 2023–present | Mike Anderson | 2 | 27–72–1 | .275 |

Longest Tenure
| Rank | Name | Seasons |
|---|---|---|
| 1 | Pete Butler | 25 |
| 2 | Tom Petroff | 15 |
| 3 | Terry Hensley | 12 |

Most Wins
| Rank | Name | Wins |
|---|---|---|
| 1 | Pete Butler | 417 |
| 2 | Tom Petroff | 367 |
| 3 | Terry Hensley | 289 |

Best Winning Pct.
| Rank | Name | Pct. |
|---|---|---|
| 1 | Pete Butler | .731 |
| 2 | Tom Petroff | .649 |
| 3 | George E. Cooper | .587 |

== Postseason appearances ==
=== NCAA tournament ===
| Year | Site | Record | Notes |
|---|---|---|---|
| 1949 | Bovard Field | 1–2 | West Regional |
| 1951 | Unknown | 2–0 | Won District VII Playoff |
| 1952 | Jackson Field | 2–0 | Won District VII Playoff |
| 1952 | Omaha Municipal Stadium | 0–2 | CWS Seventh Place |
| 1953 | Derks Field | 2–1 | Won District VII Playoff |
| 1953 | Omaha Municipal Stadium | 0–2 | CWS Seventh Place |
| 1954 | Jackson Field | 1–2 | Lost District VII Playoff |
| 1955 | Jackson Field | 2–1 | Won District VII Playoff |
| 1955 | Omaha Municipal Stadium | 1–2 | CWS Fifth Place |
| 1956 | Jackson Field | 1–2 | Lost District VII Playoff |
| 1957 | Jackson Field | 2–1 | Won District VII Playoff |
| 1957 | Omaha Municipal Stadium | 0–2 | CWS Seventh Place |
| 1958 | Cougar Field | 1–2 | Lost District VII Playoff |
| 1958 | Omaha Municipal Stadium | 1–2 | CWS Fifth Place |
| 1959 | Jackson Field | 2–1 | Won District VII Playoff |
| 1959 | Omaha Municipal Stadium | 0–2 | CWS Seventh Place |
| 1960 | Derks Field | 2–1 | Won District VII Playoff |
| 1960 | Omaha Municipal Stadium | 0–2 | CWS Seventh Place |
| 1961 | Unknown | 3–1 | Won District VII Playoff |
| 1961 | Omaha Municipal Stadium | 0–2 | CWS Seventh Place |
| 1962 | Jackson Field | 3–0 | Won District VII Playoff |
| 1962 | Omaha Municipal Stadium | 0–2 | CWS Seventh Place |
| 1963 | UA Field | 0–3 | Lost District VII Playoff |
| 1964 | Falcon Baseball Field | 0–2 | Lost District VII Playoff |
| 1965 | Phoenix Municipal Stadium | 2–4 | Lost District VII Playoff |
| 1966 | Jackson Field | 0–2 | Lost District VII Playoff |
| 1968 | Unknown | 1–2 | Lost District VII Playoff |
| 1971 | Unknown | 3–2 | Lost Midwest Regional |
| 1972 | Unknown | 2–2 | Lost Midwest Regional |
| 1973 | Unknown | 2–2 | Lost Midwest Regional |
| 1974 | Jackson Field | 4–1 | Won District VII Playoff |
| 1974 | Johnny Rosenblatt Stadium | 1–2 | CWS Fifth Place |
| 1975 | Packard Stadium | 0–2 | Lost Rocky Mountain Regional |
| 1976 | Bailey Field | 0–2 | Lost West Regional |
| 1994 | Mules’ Field | 0–2 | Lost Central Regional |
| 1998 | Mules’ Field | 0–2 | Lost Central Regional |
| Total | – | 41–60 | (38–40 regionals) (0–0 super reg.) (3–20 CWS) |

== Conference affiliations ==
- Rocky Mountain Conference: 1924–1972
- Great Plains Athletic Conference: 1973–1976
- Division I Independent: 1977–1990
- North Central Conference 1991–2003
- Division I Independent: 2004–2009
- Great West Conference: 2010–2013
- Western Athletic Conference: 2014–2021
- Summit League: 2022–present

== Awards and honors ==
=== All-Americans ===
| Year | Position | Name | Team | Selector |
|---|---|---|---|---|
| 1949 | P | Harry Wise | 3rd | ABCA |
| 1954 | OF | Richard Porter | 2nd | ABCA |
| 1956 | P | John Hogg | 3rd | ABCA |
| 1957 | P | John Hogg | 3rd | ABCA |
| 1957 | OF | Del Peterson | 2nd | ABCA |
| 1958 | C | Larry Klumb | 3rd | ABCA |
| 1959 | P | Don Herrick | 3rd | ABCA |
| 1961 | OF | John Koehler | 3rd | ABCA |
| 1967 | SS | Greg Riddoch | 3rd | ABCA |
| 1972 | C | Bob DeMeo | 2nd | ABCA |
| 1973 | C | Bob DeMeo | 3rd | ABCA |
| 1974 | C | Bob DeMeo | 3rd | ABCA |
| 1982 | OF | Jordon Berge | 3rd | ABCA |
| 1989 | OF | Tim Walstrom | 1st | ABCA |
| 1990 | OF | Tim Walstrom | 1st | ABCA |
| 2003 | 1B | Phil Delich | 2nd | ABCA |
| 2013 | OF | Nick Miller | 2nd | ABCA |

=== Freshman All-Americans ===
| Year | Position | Name | Selector |
|---|---|---|---|
| 2012 | OF | Jensen Park | Louisville Slugger |

=== Conference player of the year ===
| Year | Conference | Position | Name |
|---|---|---|---|
| 2013 | Great West | OF | Jensen Park |
| 2015 | WAC | OF | Jensen Park |

=== Conference coach of the year ===
| Year | Conference | Name |
|---|---|---|
| 2013 | Great West | Carl Iwasaki |
