= 1948 College Baseball All-America Team =

This is a list of college baseball players named first team All-Americans for the 1948 NCAA baseball season. From 1947 to 1963, the American Baseball Coaches Association was the only generally recognized All-America selector, so any player selected by the ABCA is considered a "consensus" All-American.

== Key ==
A	American Baseball Coaches Association
	Member of the National College Baseball Hall of Fame
	Consensus All-American – selected the ABCA

== All-Americans ==
Position	Name	School	#	A
Pitcher	Wally Hood	USC	1	✓
Pitcher	Frank Quinn	Yale	1	✓
Catcher	Emmett Cheek	North Carolina	1	✓
First baseman	Jack Wallace	NYU	1	✓
Second baseman	Art Mazmanian	USC	1	✓
Shortstop	Rip Ryan	North Carolina	1	✓
Third baseman	Richard Mathews	Yale	1	✓
Outfielder	John Bird	Lafayette	1	✓
Outfielder	Ruck Steger	Illinois	1	✓
Outfielder	Hank Workman	USC	1	✓

== See also ==
- List of college baseball awards
