= 1948 USC Trojans baseball team =

American college baseball season

1948 USC Trojans baseball

College World Series Champions Pacific Coast Conference champions
- Conference: Pacific Coast Conference
- Record: 26–4 (13–2 PCC)
- Head coach: Sam Barry (16th year); Rod Dedeaux (7th year)
- Home stadium: Bovard Field

1948 Pacific Coast Conference baseball standings
| | Conf. | | | | | | Overall |
| Team | W | | L | | T | PCT | W | | L | | T | PCT |
|---|---|---|---|---|---|---|---|---|---|---|---|---|
North Division
| Washington State ‍†‍‍ | 8 | – | 3 | – | 0 | .727 | 21 | – | 7 | – | 0 | .750 |
| Oregon ‍‍‍ | 10 | – | 5 | – | 0 | .667 | 12 | – | 6 | – | 0 | .667 |
| Washington ‍‍‍ | 8 | – | 7 | – | 0 | .533 | 8 | – | 7 | – | 0 | .533 |
| Oregon State ‍‍‍ | 4 | – | 7 | – | 0 | .364 | 7 | – | 7 | – | 0 | .500 |
| Idaho ‍‍‍ | 2 | – | 10 | – | 0 | .167 | 10 | – | 12 | – | 1 | .457 |
California Intercollegiate Baseball Association
| Southern California ‍†‍‍^{y} | 13 | – | 2 | – | 0 | .867 | 26 | – | 5 | – | 0 | .839 |
| Santa Clara ‍‍‍ | 9 | – | 6 | – | 0 | .600 | 15 | – | 11 | – | 0 | .577 |
| California ‍‍‍ | 8 | – | 3 | – | 0 | .727 | 20 | – | 14 | – | 0 | .588 |
| Stanford ‍‍‍ | 5 | – | 9 | – | 0 | .357 | 15 | – | 11 | – | 0 | .577 |
| UCLA ‍‍‍ | 5 | – | 10 | – | 0 | .333 | 21 | – | 18 | – | 0 | .538 |
| St. Mary's ‍‍‍ | 4 | – | 10 | – | 0 | .286 | 0 | – | 0 | – | 0 | – |
† – Conference champion y – Invited to the NCAA tournament

The 1948 USC Trojans baseball team represented the University of Southern California in the 1948 NCAA baseball season. The team was coached by co-head coaches Sam Barry and Rod Dedeaux.

The Trojans won the College World Series, defeating future U.S. President George H. W. Bush and the Yale Bulldogs in the championship series.

== Roster ==
1948 USC Trojans roster
| Pitchers: Dick Bishop; Dick Fiedler; Wally Hood; Maynard Horst; Tom Kipp; Don Pender; Bob Williams; Catchers: Harry Gorman; Jerome Jones; Bruce McKelvey; Bob Zuber | Infielders: Jim Brideweser; Mike Catron; Henry Cedillos; James Hardy; Dave Haserot; George Hefner; Bill Lille; Art Mazmanian; Paul Salata | Outfielders: Chuck Freeman; Gail Henley; Gordon Jones; Charles Pryor; Jay Roundy; Al Wilson; Hank Workman; Coaches: Sam Barry; Rod Dedeaux |

== Schedule ==
Legend
| | USC win |
| | USC loss |
| **Bold** | USC team member |
| * | Non-Conference game |

1948 USC Trojans baseball game log
Regular season

March
| Date | Opponent | Site/stadium | Score | Overall record | PCC Record |
|---|---|---|---|---|---|
| March 5 | Pepperdine | Bovard Field • Los Angeles, CA | **W** 11–0 | 1–0 | |
| March 20 | UCLA | Bovard Field • Los Angeles, CA | **W** 13–0 | 2–0 | 1–0 |
| March 23 | Loyola Marymount | Bovard Field • Los Angeles, CA | **W** 14–4 | 3–0 | |
| March 27 | Loyola Marymount | Bovard Field • Los Angeles, CA | **W** 15–7 | 4–0 | |

April
| Date | Opponent | Site/stadium | Score | Overall record | PCC Record |
|---|---|---|---|---|---|
| April 9 | at Santa Barbara College | Santa Barbara, CA | **W** 6–5 | 5–0 | |
| April 10 | at Santa Barbara College | Santa Barbara, CA | **L** 6–7 | 5–1 | |
| April 13 | at San Diego State | San Diego, CA | **W** 10–7 | 6–1 | |
| April 16 | Santa Clara | Bovard Field • Los Angeles, CA | **L** 4–5 | 6–2 | 1–1 |
| April 17 | Santa Clara | Bovard Field • Los Angeles, CA | **W** 7–6 | 7–2 | 2–1 |
| April 23 | at Santa Clara | Santa Clara, CA | **W** 9–2 | 8–2 | 3–1 |
| April 24 | at Stanford | Sunken Diamond • Stanford, CA | **W** 12–10 | 9–2 | 4–1 |
| April 27 | at UCLA | Joe E. Brown Field • Los Angeles, CA | **L** 0–2 | 9–3 | 4–2 |
| April 30 | California | Bovard Field • Los Angeles, CA | **W** 15–11 | 10–3 | 5–2 |

May
| Date | Opponent | Site/stadium | Score | Overall record | PCC Record |
|---|---|---|---|---|---|
| May 1 | California | Bovard Field • Los Angeles, CA | **W** 8–2 | 11–3 | 6–2 |
| May 4 | San Francisco | Bovard Field • Los Angeles, CA | **W** 12–3 | 12–3 | |
| May 7 | Saint Mary's | Bovard Field • Los Angeles, CA | **W** 5–4 | 13–3 | 7–2 |
| May 8 | Saint Mary's | Bovard Field • Los Angeles, CA | **W** 10–1 | 14–3 | 8–2 |
| May 14 | Stanford | Bovard Field • Los Angeles, CA | **W** 3–1 | 15–3 | 9–2 |
| May 15 | Stanford | Bovard Field • Los Angeles, CA | **W** 13–6 | 16–3 | 10–2 |
| May 18 | UCLA | Bovard Field • Los Angeles, CA | **W** 4–3 | 17–3 | 11–2 |
| May 21 | at Saint Mary's | Louis Guisto Field • Moraga, CA | **W** 13–7 | 18–3 | 12–2 |
| May 22 | at California | Evans Diamond • Berkeley, CA | **W** 4–2 | 19–3 | 13–2 |

Postseason

Pacific Coast Conference Playoff
| Date | Opponent | Site/stadium | Score | Overall record | Playoff record |
|---|---|---|---|---|---|
| May 28 | at Washington State | Pullman, WA | **W** 7–5 | 20–3 | 1–0 |
| May 31 | at Washington State | Pullman, WA | **W** 6–3 | 21–3 | 2–0 |

NCAA tournament: Western Playoff
| Date | Opponent | Site/stadium | Score | Overall record | NCAAT record |
|---|---|---|---|---|---|
| June 16 | vs. Baylor | Denver, CO | **W** 8–0 | 22–3 | 1–0 |
| June 17 | vs. Oklahoma A&M | Denver, CO | **W** 7–1 | 23–3 | 2–0 |
| June 19 | vs. Baylor | Denver, CO | **W** 16–3 | 24–3 | 3–0 |

NCAA tournament: College World Series
| Date | Opponent | Site/stadium | Score | Overall record | CWS record |
|---|---|---|---|---|---|
| June 25 | vs. Yale | Hyames Field • Kalamazoo, MI | **W** 3–1 | 25–3 | 1–0 |
| June 26 | vs. Yale | Hyames Field • Kalamazoo, MI | **L** 3–8 | 25–4 | 1–1 |
| June 26 | vs. Yale | Hyames Field • Kalamazoo, MI | **W** 9–2 | 26–4 | 2–1 |

== Awards and honors ==
Jim Brideweser

- All-PCC First Team

Wally Hood

- All-American First Team
- All-PCC First Team

Bill Lillie

- All-PCC Honorable Mention

Art Mazmanian

- All-PCC First Team
- All-American First Team

Bruce McKelvey

- All-PCC Second Team

Hank Workman

- All-PCC First Team
- All-American First Team

Bob Zuber

- All-PCC Honorable Mention
