= Wally Hood =

Wally Hood may refer to:

- Wally Hood (outfielder) (1895–1965), major league outfielder
- Wally Hood (pitcher) (1925–2001), major league pitcher on the New York Yankees all-time roster
- Wally Hood (American football) (1935-2017), American football player and coach
