= 1948 NCAA baseball tournament =

American college sports championship

1948 NCAA I baseball tournament
- Season: 1948
- Teams: 8
- Finals site: Hyames Field; Kalamazoo, MI
- Champions: Southern California (1st title)
- Runner-up: Yale (2nd CWS Appearance)
- Winning coach: Sam Barry; Rod Dedeaux (1st title)

The 1948 NCAA baseball tournament was the second NCAA-sanctioned baseball tournament that determined a national champion. The tournament was held as the conclusion of the 1948 NCAA baseball season. The 1948 College World Series was played at Hyames Field on the campus of Western Michigan University in Kalamazoo, Michigan from June 25 to 26. The tournament champion was Southern California coached by Sam Barry and Rod Dedeaux. It was the Trojans' first of 12 championships through the 2022 season.

== Tournament ==
The tournament was divided into two regional brackets, the Eastern playoff and the Western playoff. Unlike the previous year, this year's tournament was double-elimination.

=== Field ===
As with the inaugural tournament, each representative of the eight districts was determined by a mix of selection committees, conference champions, and district playoffs.. Eight teams were divided among the East and West brackets. The district playoffs would later expand to become regionals, but were originally not part of the NCAA-sanctioned championship play.

School	Conference	Record (Conference)	Berth	Previous NCAA Appearances
Baylor	SWC	16–9 (9–5)	District VI Selection	None
Colorado State College (Note: Colorado State College is currently known as the University of Northern Colorado. Not to be confused with Colorado State University, then known as Colorado A&M.)	RMC		District VII Selection	None
Illinois	Big Nine	20–5–1 (10–2)	Won District IV Playoffs	1; 1947
Lafayette	Independent	16–8	Won District II Playoffs	None
North Carolina	Southern		Won District III Playoffs	None
Oklahoma A&M	MVC	19–4	Won District V Playoffs	None
Southern California	CIBA	22–3 (13–2)	District VIII Selection (won PCC Playoff)	None
Yale	EIBL	18–6–1 (6–3)	District I Selection	1; 1947

=== Eastern playoff ===
At Winston-Salem, North Carolina

First round
Yale	6
North Carolina	1
Winner's bracket
Lafayette	9
Illinois	6
North Carolina	7
Illinois	3
Loser's bracket

Semi-finals
Yale	11
Lafayette	2
Lafayette	5
North Carolina	2

Finals
Yale	4	–
Lafayette	3	–

=== Western playoff ===
At Denver, Colorado

First round
Southern California	8
Baylor	0
Winner's bracket
Oklahoma A&M	13
Colorado State College	7
Baylor	13
Colorado State College	4
Loser's bracket

Semi-finals
Southern California	7
Oklahoma A&M	1
Oklahoma A&M	8
Baylor	9

Finals
Southern California	16	–
Baylor	3	–

== College World Series ==
=== Participants ===
School	Conference	Record (conference)	Head coach	CWS appearances	CWS best finish	CWS record
Southern California	CIBA	24–3 (13–2)	Sam Barry	0 (last: none)	none	0–0
Yale	EIBL	20–7–1 (6–3)	Ethan Allen	1 (last: 1947)	2nd (1947)	0–2

=== Results ===
The 1948 College World Series was a best of three series, like the first tournament in 1947.

==== Bracket ====
College World Series Finals
Southern California	3	3	9
Yale	1	8	2

==== Game results ====
Date	Game	Winner	Score	Loser	Notes
June 25	Game 1	Southern California	3–1	Yale	
June 26	Game 2	Yale	8–3	Southern California	
June 26	Game 3	Southern California	9–2	Yale	Southern California wins CWS

=== Notable players ===
- Southern California: Jim Brideweser, Gail Henley, Wally Hood, Hank Workman, Henry Cedillos
- Yale: George Bush, Frank Quinn, Dick Tettelbach
