= 1948 NCAA baseball season =

Baseball season

1948 NCAA Division I baseball season
- Defending champions: California

Tournament
- Duration: June 16–26, 1948

College World Series
- Duration: June 25–26, 1948
- Champions: Southern California (1st title)
- Runners-up: Yale (2nd CWS Appearance)
- Winning coach: Sam Barry & Rod Dedeaux (1st title)

Seasons
- ← 1947 1949 →

The 1948 NCAA baseball season, play of college baseball in the United States organized by the National Collegiate Athletic Association (NCAA) began in the spring of 1948. The season progressed through the regular season and concluded with the 1948 NCAA baseball tournament and 1948 College World Series. The College World Series, held for the second time in 1948, consisted of the two remaining teams in the NCAA Tournament and was held in Kalamazoo, Michigan at Hyames Field as a best of three series. Southern California claimed the championship two games to one over Yale.

== Conference winners ==
This is a partial list of conference champions from the 1948 season. Each of the eight geographical districts chose, by various methods, the team that would represent them in the NCAA Tournament. Conference champions had to be chosen, unless all conference champions declined the bid.

Conference	Regular season winner	Conference tournament	Tournament city	Tournament winner
Big Nine	Illinois	No conference tournament		
Big Seven	Nebraska	No conference tournament		
CIBA	Southern California	No conference tournament		
EIBL	Dartmouth	No conference tournament		
Mid-American Conference	Ohio	No conference tournament		
Missouri Valley Conference	Oklahoma A&M	1948 Missouri Valley Conference baseball tournament		Oklahoma A&M
Pacific Coast Conference North	Washington State	No conference tournament		
Southeastern Conference	East - Auburn; West - Mississippi State	1948 Southeastern Conference baseball championship series	Alternating campus sites	Mississippi State
Southern Conference	North Carolina	No conference tournament		
Southwest Conference	Texas	No conference tournament		

== Conference standings ==
The following is an incomplete list of conference standings:

1948 Eastern Intercollegiate Baseball League baseball standings
	Conf.						Overall
Team	W		L		T	PCT	W		L		T	PCT
Dartmouth ‍†‍‍	7	–	1	–	0	.875	12	–	4	–	1	.735
Navy ‍‍‍	7	–	2	–	0	.778	14	–	7	–	0	.667
Yale ‍‍‍^{y}	6	–	3	–	0	.667	21	–	9	–	1	.694
Army ‍‍‍	5	–	3	–	0	.625	16	–	7	–	0	.696
Cornell ‍‍‍	3	–	4	–	0	.429	8	–	9	–	0	.471
Columbia ‍‍‍	3	–	5	–	0	.375	7	–	5	–	0	.583
Penn ‍‍‍	3	–	5	–	0	.375	10	–	10	–	1	.500
Princeton ‍‍‍	3	–	6	–	0	.333	9	–	15	–	0	.375
Harvard ‍‍‍	2	–	4	–	0	.333	12	–	11	–	1	.521
Brown ‍‍‍	0	–	6	–	0	.000	2	–	11	–	0	.154
† – Conference champion y – Invited to the NCAA Tournament

1948 Pacific Coast Conference baseball standings
	Conf.						Overall
Team	W		L		T	PCT	W		L		T	PCT
North Division
Washington State ‍†‍‍	8	–	3	–	0	.727	21	–	7	–	0	.750
Oregon ‍‍‍	10	–	5	–	0	.667	12	–	6	–	0	.667
Washington ‍‍‍	8	–	7	–	0	.533	8	–	7	–	0	.533
Oregon State ‍‍‍	4	–	7	–	0	.364	7	–	7	–	0	.500
Idaho ‍‍‍	2	–	10	–	0	.167	10	–	12	–	1	.457
California Intercollegiate Baseball Association
Southern California ‍†‍‍^{y}	13	–	2	–	0	.867	26	–	5	–	0	.839
Santa Clara ‍‍‍	9	–	6	–	0	.600	15	–	11	–	0	.577
California ‍‍‍	8	–	3	–	0	.727	20	–	14	–	0	.588
Stanford ‍‍‍	5	–	9	–	0	.357	15	–	11	–	0	.577
UCLA ‍‍‍	5	–	10	–	0	.333	21	–	18	–	0	.538
St. Mary's ‍‍‍	4	–	10	–	0	.286	0	–	0	–	0	–
† – Conference champion y – Invited to the NCAA tournament

== NCAA tournament ==
The 1948 season marked the second NCAA Baseball Tournament, which consisted of eight teams divided into two brackets by region. The Eastern playoff was held in Winston-Salem, North Carolina, while the Western playoff was held in Denver, Colorado. Unlike the previous year, a double-elimination format was used. The winner of each bracket advanced to the College World Series in Kalamazoo, MI, where Southern California defeated Yale in a best of three series.

College World Series Finals
Southern California	3	3	9
Yale	1	8	2
