= Rod Dedeaux =

American baseball coach (1914–2006)

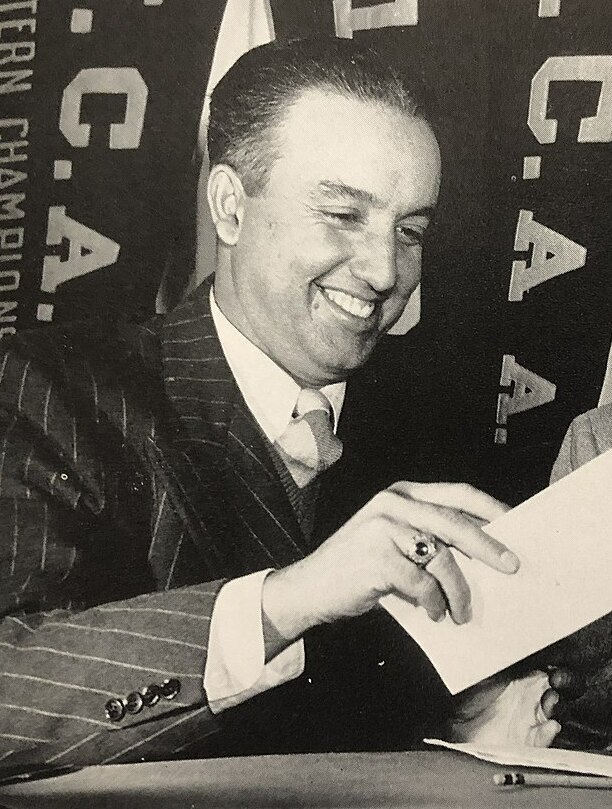
- Dedeaux, c. 1950

Biographical details
- Born: February 17, 1914; New Orleans, Louisiana, U.S.
- Died: January 5, 2006 (aged 91); Glendale, California, U.S.
- Education: USC

Playing career
- Position: Shortstop

Coaching career (HC unless noted)
- 1942–1986: USC

Head coaching record
- Overall: 1,332–571–11

Accomplishments and honors

Championships
- 11× College World Series Champion (1948, 1958, 1961, 1963, 1968, 1970–1974, 1978); 29× PCC/AAWUPac-8/Pac-10 Regular season Champion (1942, 1946–1949, 1951–1961, 1963, 1964, 1966, 1968, 1970–1975, 1977, 1978); 14× PCC/AAWUPac-8/Pac-10 Tournament champion (1948, 1949, 1951, 1955, 1958, 1959, 1970–1975, 1977, 1978)

Awards
- 6× Coach of the Year (CBCA); CBCA Hall of Fame (1970); ABCA Hall of Fame (1970); Coach of the Century (Collegiate Baseball Newspaper)
- College Baseball Hall of Fame; Inducted in 2006

Baseball career
- Batted: Right Threw: Right

MLB debut
- September 28, 1935, for the Brooklyn Dodgers

Last MLB appearance
- September 29, 1935, for the Brooklyn Dodgers

MLB statistics
- Batting average: .250
- Home runs: 0
- Runs batted in: 1
- Stats at Baseball Reference

Teams
- Brooklyn Dodgers (1935)

Raoul Martial "Rod" Dedeaux (February 17, 1914 – January 5, 2006) was an American college baseball coach who compiled what is widely recognized as among the greatest records of any coach in the sport's amateur history.

Dedeaux was the head baseball coach at the University of Southern California (USC) in Los Angeles for 45 seasons, and retired at age 72 in 1986. His teams won 11 national titles (College World Series), including a record five straight (1970–1974), and 28 conference championships. Dedeaux was named Coach of the Year six times by the Collegiate Baseball Coaches Association and was inducted into its Hall of Fame in 1970. He was named "Coach of the Century" by Collegiate Baseball magazine and was one of ten initial inductees to the College Baseball Hall of Fame.

Dedeaux also coached the United States national team at two different editions of the Summer Olympic Games: Tokyo 1964 and Los Angeles 1984.

== Early life ==
Born in New Orleans, Louisiana, Dedeaux moved to Los Angeles and graduated from Hollywood High School in 1931. He played baseball at the University of Southern California for three seasons and was a member of the Trojan Knights. Dedeaux then played professional baseball briefly in 1935, appearing in two games as a shortstop for the Brooklyn Dodgers late in the season. The following year while playing for Dayton in the Mid-Atlantic League, he cracked a vertebra while swinging in cold weather, ending his season. Dedeaux played parts of two minor league seasons in 1938 and 1939 before retiring from professional baseball. He then turned to coaching in the semi-pro and amateur ranks.

== Career ==
Dedeaux invested $500 to start a trucking firm, Dart (Dedeaux Automotive Repair and Transit) Enterprises, which he built into a successful regional business. When his college coach, Sam Barry, entered the U.S. Navy during World War II, he recommended Dedeaux to take over the team in 1942 for the war's duration. Upon Barry's return in 1946, they served as co-coaches with Dedeaux running the team each year until Barry finished the basketball season. USC won its first national title in 1948, over Yale, captained by first baseman George H. W. Bush. The finals were held at Hyames Field in Kalamazoo, Michigan, settled by a 9–2 win in the third and deciding game.

Following Barry's death in September 1950, Dedeaux became the sole coach and proceeded to build on his early success to establish the strongest program in collegiate baseball. Prior to his retirement in June 1986, Dedeaux's teams won ten additional College World Series titles in Omaha, including five straight (1970–74) and six in seven years. No other coach had won more than three titles until 1997.

At USC, Dedeaux coached dozens of future major leaguers, including Ron Fairly, Don Buford, Tom Seaver, Dave Kingman, Roy Smalley, Fred Lynn, Steve Kemp, Mark McGwire, and Randy Johnson. Throughout his USC career, he accepted a nominal salary of just $1 per year since his trucking business supplied him with a substantial income. He turned down numerous offers of major league coaching positions, including invitations from Los Angeles Dodgers manager Tommy Lasorda to join his staff, always rejecting them due to his preference for the college game and his desire to remain close to his family. Dedeaux collaborated Edmonton baseball executive John Ducey to bring former college players to Alberta.

He retired as the winningest coach in college baseball history with a record of 1,332–571–11 (.699), and for the rest of his life remained an honored annual presence at the College World Series in Omaha. At the 1999 edition, the 50th played in Omaha, he was given a key to the city by the mayor and a one-minute standing ovation by the fans at Rosenblatt Stadium. He was inducted into the American Baseball Coaches Association's Hall of Fame in 1970, and in 1999 was named the Coach of the Century by Collegiate Baseball magazine.

USC played its home games at Bovard Field through 1973, and Dedeaux became known as "The Houdini of Bovard" for the come-from-behind home-field wins by the Trojans. A new baseball field named Dedeaux Field opened in 1974, named in honor of the active head coach.

=== Olympics ===
Dedeaux was the head coach of the United States baseball teams at the 1964 Summer Olympics in Tokyo and the 1984 Summer Olympics in Los Angeles, where baseball was contested both times as a demonstration sport. The 1964 team played one game as part of the Olympic program, defeating a Japanese amateur all-star team, while the 1984 team finished second in a field of eight teams, winning its first four games and losing to Japan in the final game of the tournament.

=== Films ===
Dedeaux also served as the baseball coach and consultant for actors and ballplayers on the 1989 film Field of Dreams. While Dedeaux was critical of the "phoniness that was in baseball movies," an opinion which he acquired while working as an extra in the 1948 film The Babe Ruth Story, he accepted the task after reading the original novel Shoeless Joe and brought Buford along to help him coach the cast. Phil Alden Robinson, who directed the film, stated that ballplayers were prepared for the film by Dedeaux.

== Personal ==
Dedeaux was married to the former Helen L. Jones (1915–2007) for 66 years and they had four children.

== Death and legacy ==
Dedeaux died in early 2006 at age 91 at Glendale Adventist Medical Center in Glendale of complications from a stroke five weeks earlier. Six months later on July 4, he was one of ten in the first class inducted into the College Baseball Hall of Fame. Dedeaux was also inducted in the inaugural class of the Omaha College Baseball Hall of Fame in 2013, and a statue of him was unveiled at Dedeaux Field on the USC campus in 2014.

Dedeaux was inducted into the Baseball Reliquary's Shrine of the Eternals in 2005.

Dedeaux and his wife Helen are buried at Forest Lawn Memorial Park, in Hollywood Hills, Los Angeles.

== Head coaching record ==
Record table
Season	Team	Overall	Conference	Standing	Postseason
Southern California Trojans (California Intercollegiate Baseball Association) (1942–1986)
1942	Southern California	14–2	12–2	1st	
1943	Southern California	14–2	10–0	2nd	
1944	Southern California	12–4	4–4	2nd	
1945	Southern California	7–8	3–5	3rd	
1946	Southern California	15–2	11–1	1st	
1947	Southern California	16-6	11-4	T-1st	
1948	Southern California	26-4	13-2	1st	College World Series Champions
1949	Southern California	23-6	12-2	1st	College World Series
1950	Southern California	16-8	8-7	T-3rd	
1951	Southern California	22-10	11-5	1st	College World Series
1952	Southern California	18-9	11–5	1st	
1953	Southern California	21-9	10-6	T-1st	District 8 Playoffs
1954	Southern California	14-7	11–5	1st	District 8 Playoffs
1955	Southern California	23-5	12-3	1st	College World Series
1956	Southern California	21-5	14-2	1st	
1957	Southern California	18-4	12-4	T-1st	
1958	Southern California	28-3	14-2	1st	College World Series Champions
1959	Southern California	23-4-1	14-2	1st	
1960	Southern California	32-11	12-4	T-1st	College World Series Runners-Up
1961	Southern California	36-7	12-4	1st	College World Series Champions
1962	Southern California	29-10	11–5	2nd	
1963	Southern California	35-10	10-6	1st	College World Series Champions
1964	Southern California	34-11	17-3	1st	College World Series
1965	Southern California	23-14	9-11	4th	
1966	Southern California	42-9	16-4	1st	College World Series
1967	Southern California	30-11-2	9-6	T-3rd	
1968	Southern California	42-12-1	16-2-1	1st	College World Series Champions
1969	Southern California	39-12-1	13-8	3rd	
1970	Southern California	45-13	11–3	1st	College World Series Champions
1971	Southern California	46-11	17-0	1st	College World Series Champions
1972	Southern California	47-13	14-4	1st	College World Series Champions
1973	Southern California	51-11	14-4	1st	College World Series Champions
1974	Southern California	50-20	11–7	1st	College World Series Champions
1975	Southern California	42-14-1	12-4	1st	NCAA West Regional
1976	Southern California	33-26-2	15-8-1	2nd	
1977	Southern California	46-20	16-2	1st	NCAA West Regional
1978	Southern California	54-9	15-3	1st	College World Series Champions
1979	Southern California	33-24	15-15	4th	
1980	Southern California	27-24	13-17	T-5th	
1981	Southern California	34-24	15-15	3rd	
1982	Southern California	23-36	9-21	6th	
1983	Southern California	32-23-1	17-13	T-2nd	
1984	Southern California	44-23	18-12	T-2nd	NCAA West I Regional
1985	Southern California	22-44	5-25	6th	
1986	Southern California	26-29	12-18	4th	
Southern California:		1,332–571–11	547–285–2		
Total:		1,332–571–11			
National champion Postseason invitational champion Conference regular season champion Conference regular season and conference tournament champion Division regular season champion Division regular season and conference tournament champion Conference tournament champion

== See also ==
- List of college baseball career coaching wins leaders
