= Judson Hyames =

American baseball coach

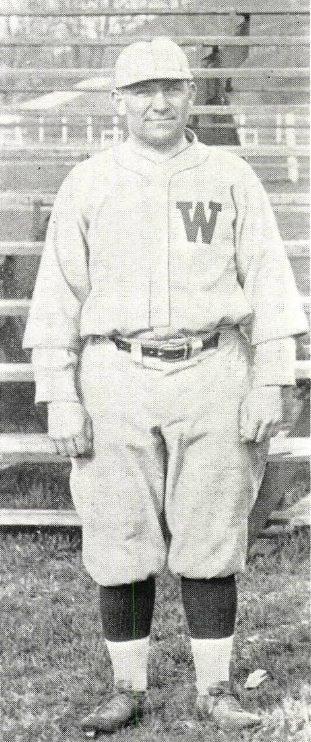
- Hyames from the 1925 Brown and Gold yearbook
- Born: 1888
- Died: August 19, 1949 (aged 60–61)

Judson A. Hyames (c. 1888 – August 19, 1949) was the head baseball coach at Western State Normal School/Western State Teachers College (now known Western Michigan University) from 1922 to 1936. In his 15 years at the school, he posted a 166–62–2 record. In his honor, WMU's baseball stadium—Hyames Field—was named after him. He also played for the Western State Normal School baseball team in 1915. From 1937 to 1949, he served as the school's athletic director until his death.

Hyames was also an assistant football coach at the University of Michigan in 1926, under football coach Fielding H. Yost.

== See also ==
- Hyames Field
