= Sam Barry =

American football, basketball, and baseball player and coach (1892–1950)

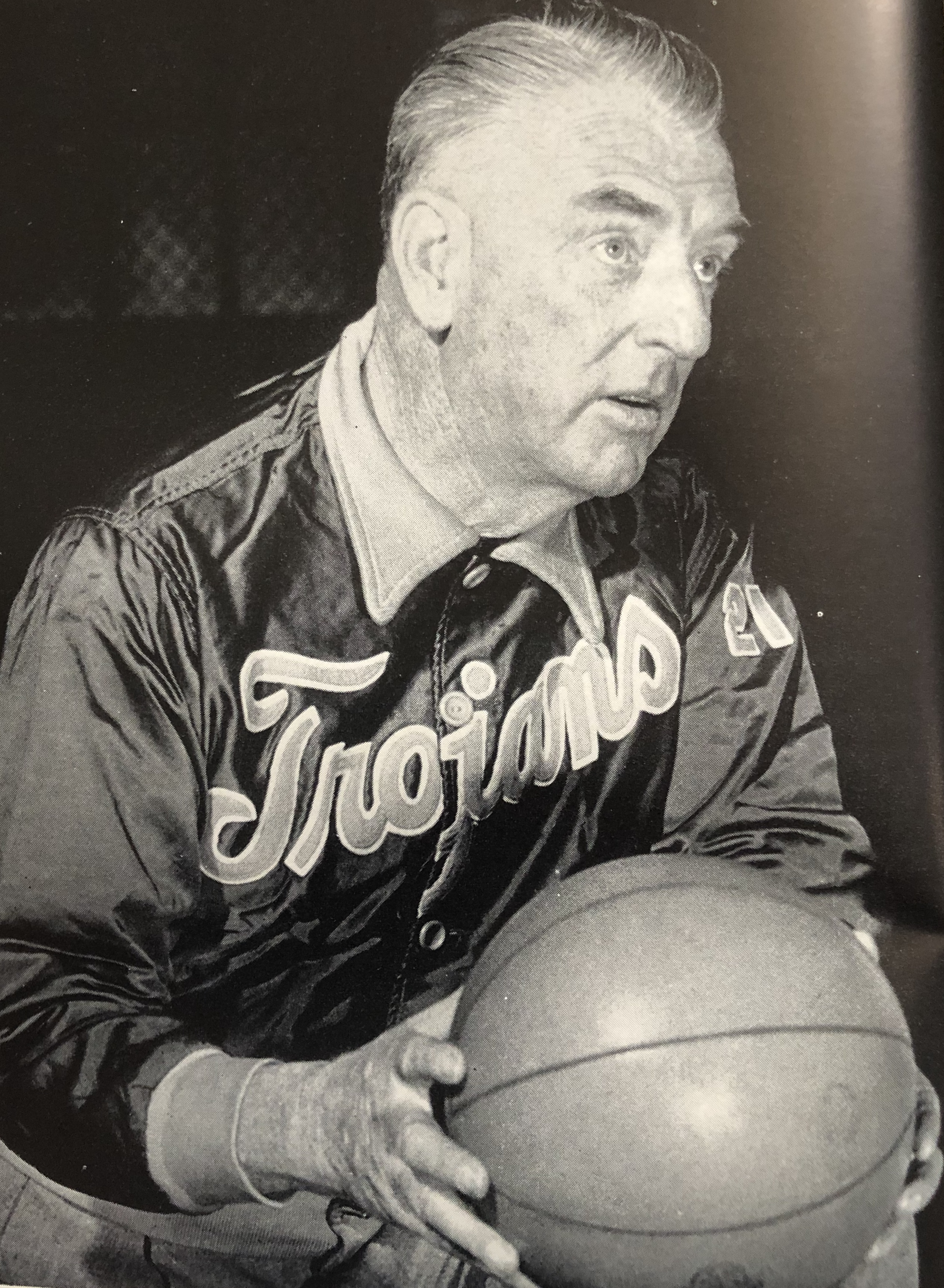
- Barry from the 1950 El Rodeo

Biographical details
- Born: December 17, 1892; Aberdeen, South Dakota, U.S.
- Died: September 23, 1950 (aged 57); Berkeley, California, U.S.

Coaching career (HC unless noted)

Basketball
- 1918–1922: Knox (IL)
- 1922–1929: Iowa
- 1929–1941: USC
- 1945–1950: USC

Football
- 1918–1921: Knox (IL)
- 1922–1928: Iowa (assistant)
- 1929–1940: USC (assistant)
- 1941: USC
- 1945–1950: USC (assistant)

Baseball
- 1923–1924: Iowa
- 1930–1942: USC
- 1946–1950: USC

Head coaching record
- Overall: 17–18–5 (football); 360–207 (basketball); 361–141–4 (baseball)

Accomplishments and honors

Championships
- Basketball: 2 Big Ten (1923, 1926); 4 PCC (1930, 1933, 1935, 1940); 6 PCC South Division (1930, 1933–1935, 1939–1940); Baseball: NCAA (1948); 10 PCC regular season (1930, 1932, 1935, 1936, 1939, 1942, 1946–1949)
- Basketball Hall of Fame; Inducted in 1979 (profile)
- College Basketball Hall of Fame; Inducted in 2006

Justin McCarthy "Sam" Barry (December 17, 1892 – September 23, 1950) was an American collegiate coach who achieved significant accomplishments in three major sports - football, baseball, and basketball. He remains one of only three coaches to lead teams to both the Final Four and the College World Series. Barry, and four of his USC players (Jack Gardner, Alex Hannum, Tex Winter and Bill Sharman), have been inducted into the Naismith Memorial Basketball Hall of Fame as coaches; Sharman was also inducted as a player.

== Early career ==
Born in Aberdeen, South Dakota, Barry starred in basketball, baseball, and football in high school in Madison, Wisconsin. He continued his success at Lawrence College in Appleton, later completing his degree at the University of Wisconsin in Madison. He returned to Madison High School to begin his coaching career, and then became the athletic director at Knox College in Illinois from 1918 to 1922, where he also served as coach of football, basketball, baseball, and track.

In 1922, Barry was named basketball coach at the University of Iowa in Iowa City, and also became a football assistant under Hawkeyes head coach Howard Jones, an association which would continue for 15 years at two universities. Barry also coached the baseball team in 1923 and 1924. He led the Hawkeye basketball team to Big Ten Conference co-championships in 1923 and 1926—the first two conference titles in team history. In 1929, he wrote a handbook on the sport: "Basketball: Individual Play and Team Play" that featured University of Iowa players and facilities. He also helped Jones guide the football squad to an undefeated 7–0 season in 1922, winning a share of the Big Ten title—the last for Hawkeyes football until 1956.

In 1929, the University of Southern California in Los Angeles was in need of a new basketball coach, and Jones—at USC since 1925—recommended his old colleague for the position. Barry followed Jones out west, and took over the USC basketball program as well as the baseball team, while also resuming his duties as an assistant football coach under Jones. Barry's Trojan basketball teams won Pacific Coast Conference titles in 1930, 1935, and 1940—along with eight southern division titles between 1930 and 1940—and conference crowns in baseball in 1930, 1932, 1935, 1936, 1939, 1946, 1947, 1948, and 1949. In 1940, the USC basketball team was widely considered to be the best in the nation, and participated in the nascent NCAA tournament, but they lost their bid for the national title when they were upset in the national semifinal at Kansas City, against Kansas, when the son of opposing coach, Phog Allen, made a basket with seconds left for a one-point victory. Despite the loss, the Helms Athletic Foundation later retroactively selected USC as the 1940 national champions.

Barry was also a valued part of the USC football teams which claimed national championships in 1931, 1932, and 1939, as well as seven PCC titles and five Rose Bowl victories. He was Jones' top assistant on the sidelines from 1929 to 1940, also serving as the team's chief scout and coach of the "Spartan" scout team. Barry was often credited by the "Headman" with devising the strategies that proved most effective in shutting down opponents. Although such titles were not used at the time, Barry's position would likely have been equivalent to that of the modern defensive coordinator. The team's football successes included a 25-game winning streak from 1931 to 1933, and the undefeated 1938 team's 7–3 victory in the Rose Bowl over Duke — a team which had previously held every opponent scoreless.

== The 1940s ==
After Jones' sudden death from a heart attack in July 1941, Barry was a natural choice to take over the reins of the football team and became head coach of all three major team sports simultaneously. He had not been without success as a head coach himself; his Knox College teams posted a record of 15–12–4 from 1918 to 1921, including a perfect 8–0 mark in 1919. The 1941 USC football team finished with a losing record at 2–6–1. Not only was the team mourning the loss of Jones, but Barry also found himself facing a schedule in which a majority of USC's opponents were coached by future Hall of Famers, including Paul Brown, Frank Leahy, and Clark Shaughnessy. Injuries and illnesses also took their toll, depleting the roster at one point to a mere 28 players. Despite these roadblocks, Barry put together a team which improved offensively throughout the year, gaining popularity as the season progressed. The crowd of 86,305 at the USC–Stanford game was the largest in the nation in 1941. And the team made some upsets, defeating Rose Bowl-bound Oregon State, and nearly toppled fourth-ranked Notre Dame on the road in Indiana, falling by only two points.

In 1942, other concerns took precedence as the 49-year-old Barry entered the U.S. Navy for service during World War II. He recommended Jeff Cravath to take over his duties as USC football coach, Julie Bescos as basketball coach, and Rod Dedeaux as baseball coach for the duration of the war. As a lieutenant commander, Barry was in charge of physical and military training of Navy personnel in the South Pacific, for which he would later receive a Naval Commendation from then Secretary of the Navy James Forrestal.

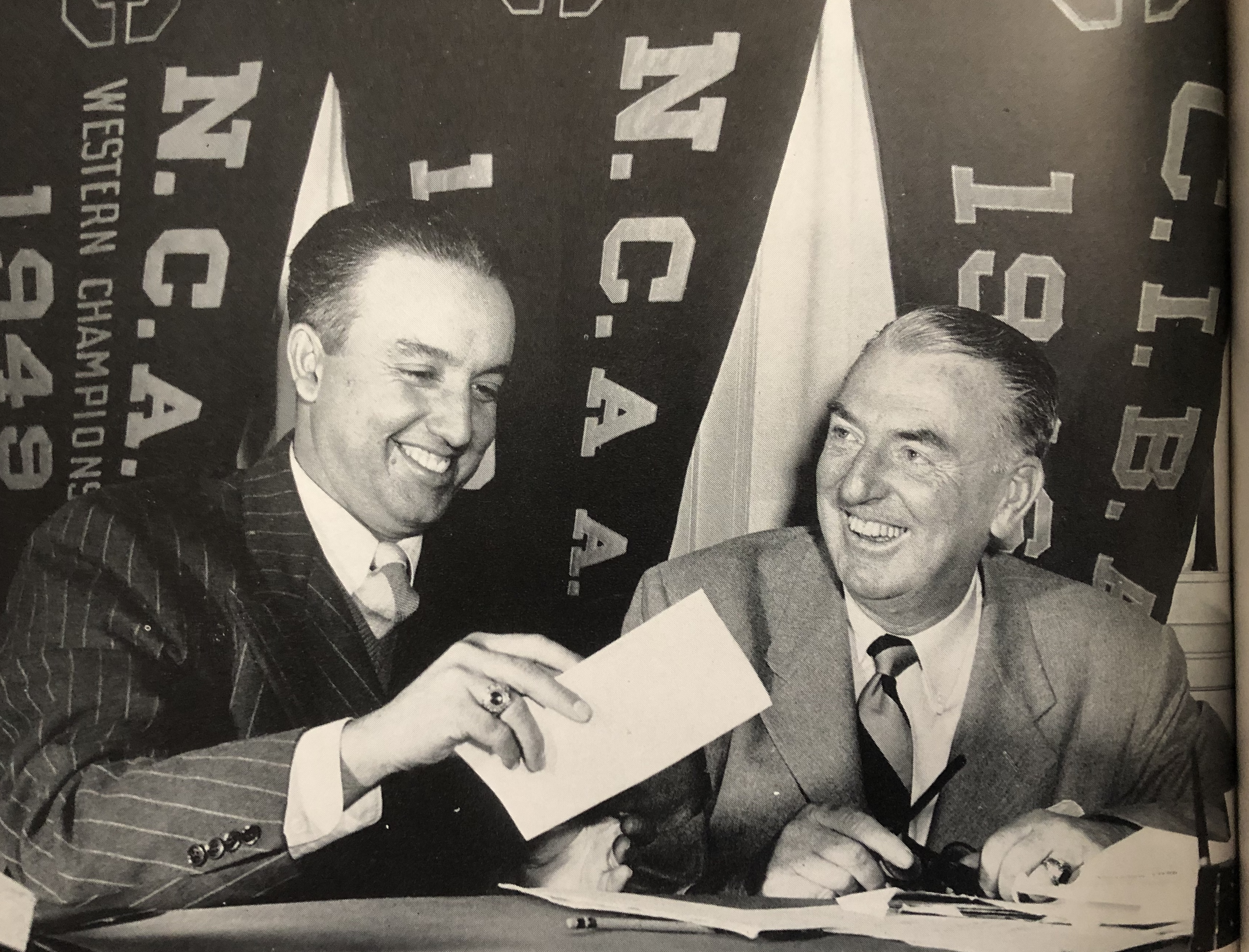
Rod Dedeaux and Barry, c. 1950

After leaving the navy in 1945, Barry resumed his positions leading the USC basketball and baseball teams, while also returning as a football assistant under Cravath. He began to restore the basketball program to a nationally competitive level, and found his greatest success yet in baseball. At the 1948 College World Series, the Trojans captured their first title by defeating a Yale team captained by future President George Bush. The finals were held at Hyames Field in Kalamazoo, Michigan, settled by a 9–2 win in the third and deciding game. The Trojans had a chance to repeat in 1949, but were eliminated when they suffered a pair of extra-inning losses to Wake Forest, both by 2–1 scores.

As the years passed, however, it became evident that Barry was suffering physically from the stress of his various responsibilities. Despite medical warnings, he agreed only to give up coaching the football scout team, continuing as head coach of two sports and serving as chief scout and sideline assistant in football. It was while scouting a USC opponent in 1950 that he died. Attending a football game in Berkeley at the University of California on September 23, he suffered a heart attack while climbing the hill to Memorial Stadium, and died before reaching the hospital.

At USC's next home football game—fittingly, against Iowa—the student body paid tribute to Barry during halftime, taking the field in a block "SC" formation and, after the Coliseum lights were turned out, lighting matches on the field of the darkened stadium for a minute of silence in memory of the coach. He was buried in Holy Cross Cemetery in Culver City.

== Legacy ==
Barry's 18 seasons as a USC assistant football coach (1929–1940, 1945–1950) rank second only to the 26 years served by Marv Goux. His 19 years of overall participation in the program trail only Goux (31 years) and Cravath (23 years). His death came just as USC basketball was regaining its pre-war success, on the cusp of the West Coast's 1950s surge in the sport which included teams coached by John Wooden at UCLA, Phil Woolpert at San Francisco, and Pete Newell at California.

Sam Barry's players benefited greatly from his leadership and teaching ability. Four basketball players— Jerry Nemer, Lee Guttero, Ralph Vaughn and Bill Sharman— earned consensus first-team All-American honors; Barry is one of only 12 coaches in history to guide as many players to this honor. Perhaps his most visible legacy is the large number of his players who went on to successful coaching careers in their own right: Sharman, Alex Hannum, Tex Winter, Jack Gardner, Forrest Twogood, and Bob Boyd in basketball, and Rod Dedeaux in baseball. In addition, Hall of Fame manager Sparky Anderson got his start in the sport while serving as a USC batboy in the 1940s. In all, 14 of Barry's baseball players went on to appear in the major leagues.

Barry was also nationally renowned as an innovator—he was the person most responsible for the elimination of the center jump after every free throw and basket in basketball, a move which resulted in a much faster-paced game; and he was also behind the move to create the center line and 10-second rule. He was the inventor of the triangle offense, which his pupil Tex Winter refined to bring great successes to the NBA champion Chicago Bulls and Los Angeles Lakers teams. And Barry, along with Kansas coach Phog Allen, was one of the two primary national advocates of the delayed offense (commonly referred to as "stalling"), which was a staple of college basketball strategy at such powerhouses as Kansas and North Carolina, and throughout the country, before the introduction of the shot clock in 1985.

A respected figure in basketball circles since his early years—Barry was one of the two officials who worked the 1923 Illinois high school basketball championship game—he served on many significant NCAA committees in his later years, and was a primary force in establishing such national playoffs as the NCAA basketball tournament and the College World Series. His teams' popularity spread to the playing field and court as well. In addition to the leading crowd of the 1941 college football season, his 1939–40 basketball team drew a record crowd when visiting Madison Square Garden.

His accomplishments as a coach still stand today – his 40-game winning streak in basketball against UCLA, compiled from 1932 to 1942, and continued in 1946, stands as the second longest winning streak by any coach against a single opponent in the history of college basketball. Only two other coaches have duplicated his achievement of leading teams to both the Final Four and the College World Series. In 1966, he became a member of the charter class of inductees to the American Baseball Coaches Association Hall of Fame, and in 1978 he was elected to membership in the Naismith Memorial Basketball Hall of Fame. He was among the 2007 class of inductees to the USC Athletic Hall of Fame He was inducted into the Pac-12 Basketball Hall of Honor during the 2012 Pac-12 Conference men's basketball tournament, March 10, 2012.

== Accolades ==
- "His successes as a basketball, baseball and football coach would fill several books but it can be safely said that when Sam died suddenly ... he left not one enemy along the trail of his phenomenal career. ... In the years to come, Sam Barry will be talked about in the same breath with Dr. Naismith when the development and progress of the game of basketball are discussed." – Paul Zimmerman, Los Angeles Times, September 25, 1950
- "I feel that the Pacific Coast Conference has lost one of its finest coaches and I feel a great personal loss. He was one of the scrappiest coaches during a game and one of the nicest persons I've ever known after the game. He was a fine fellow in every respect." – John Wooden
- "It is impossible to pinpoint Sam Barry's friendliness, his effect upon all groups. Sam was a man who loved his fellow men, loved life, loved living. He leaves a big hole, not only in the Trojan family, not only on the West Coast, but on the entire national scene. Sam Barry was a leader, the finest type of American citizen. Never having done a mean or injurious thing in his life, it is certain his soul rests in peace." – Dick Hyland, Los Angeles Times, September 26, 1950
- "About the University Sam was affectionately known as 'Elevator Sam'. That was because he had more 'life' on the bench than gridders and coaches alike. He was up every time the ball bounced. Sam got a full measure out of living and fellowship. And whereas in this day of specialists most mentors confine activities to one sport, Sam lived three full, and complete, lifetimes in sports. And, exceptionally, Sam was tops in all three. He was considered second to none in basketball. He coached numerous champions. His baseball teams were frequent titleholders." – Al Santoro, Los Angeles Examiner, September 24, 1950
- "For 34 of his 57 years the genial coach, whose name ranked with the Staggs, Warners and Joneses as bywords of the intercollegiate sports world, had engaged in one of athletics' most successful careers. ... Barry is the man most responsible for basketball as it is played today, a game that leads the nation in attendance." – Jack Geyer, Los Angeles Times, September 24, 1950

== Records and accomplishments ==
Longest winning streaks by a coach against a single opponent, college basketball:

- 51 – Mark Few (Gonzaga) vs. Pepperdine, 2002–present
- 40 – Sam Barry (USC) vs. UCLA, 1932–1942 and 1946
- 38 – Lute Olson (Arizona) vs. Washington State, 1986–2004
- 37 – Adolph Rupp (Kentucky) vs. Mississippi, 1933–1972
- 32 – John Wooden (UCLA) vs. California, 1961–1975
- 31 – Frank Keaney (Rhode Island) vs. Maine, 1924–1948
- 31 – Bob Knight (Indiana) vs. Wisconsin, 1980–1996

Note: Currently, school records do not credit Barry with coaching the team in 1942, which would reduce the streak to 38 games; however, newspaper reports indicate that Barry was still actively coaching the team, both in practice and in games, until after the two 1942 UCLA victories.

Coaches who have guided 4 or more players to consensus 1st-team All-American honors in men's basketball:

- Adolph Rupp (Kentucky) – 10
- Dean Smith (North Carolina) – 9
- Mike Krzyzewski (Duke) – 8
- John Wooden (UCLA) – 8
- Mark Few (Gonzaga) – 6
- Bob Knight (Indiana) – 6
- Ward "Piggy" Lambert (Purdue) – 5
- Lute Olson (Arizona) – 5
- John Thompson (Georgetown) – 5
- Forrest "Phog" Allen (Kansas) – 4
- Sam Barry (USC) – 4
- Jim Calhoun (Connecticut) – 4
- Roy Williams (Kansas) – 4
- Rick Barnes (Texas) – 4

Coaches who have led teams to both the Final Four and the College World Series:

- Sam Barry (USC) – Final Four in 1940; CWS in 1948 and 1949
- Everett Dean (Stanford) – Final Four in 1942; CWS in 1953
- Frank McGuire (St. John's, North Carolina) – Final Four in 1952 (St. John's, runner-up) and 1957 (UNC, champions); CWS in 1949 (St. John's)

Note: Barry's teams won only the baseball title, while Dean's and McGuire's teams won only the basketball title; however, Dean and McGuire were not coaching both sports simultaneously in the years involved, as Barry was.

== Head coaching record ==
=== Basketball ===
Record table
Season	Team	Overall	Conference	Standing	Postseason
Knox Old Siwash (Independent) (1918–1922)
1918–19	Knox	9–2			
1919–20	Knox	8–6			
1920–21	Knox	10–2			
1921–22	Knox	11–5			
Knox:		38–15 (.717)			
Iowa Hawkeyes (Big Ten Conference) (1922–1929)
1922–23	Iowa	13–2	11–1	T–1st	
1923–24	Iowa	7–10	4–8	9th	
1924–25	Iowa	6–10	5–7	7th	
1925–26	Iowa	12–5	8–4	T–1st	
1926–27	Iowa	9–8	7–5	T–4th	
1927–28	Iowa	6–11	3–9	T–7th	
1928–29	Iowa	9–8	5–7	7th	
Iowa:		62–54 (.534)	43–41 (.512)		
USC Trojans (Pacific Coast Conference) (1929–1941)
1929–30	USC	15–5	7–2	1st (South)	
1930–31	USC	8–8	5–4	2nd (South)	
1931–32	USC	10–12	8–3	2nd (South)	
1932–33	USC	18–5	10–1	1st (South)	
1933–34	USC	16–8	9–3	1st (South)	
1934–35	USC	20–6	11–1	1st (South)	
1935–36	USC	14–12	8–4	2nd (South)	
1936–37	USC	19–6	8–4	2nd (South)	
1937–38	USC	17–9	6–6	3rd (South)	
1938–39	USC	20–5	9–3	T–1st (South)	
1939–40	USC	20–3	10–2	1st (South)	Helms Foundation National Champions; NCAA Final Four
1940–41	USC	15–10	6–6	T–2nd (South)	
USC Trojans (Pacific Coast Conference) (1945–1950)
1945–46	USC	14–7	8–4	2nd (South)	
1946–47	USC	10–14	2–10	4th (South)	
1947–48	USC	14–10	7–5	2nd (South)	
1948–49	USC	14–10	8–4	2nd (South)	
1949–50	USC	16–8	7–5	2nd (South)	
USC:		260–138 (.653)	129–67 (.658)		
Total:		360–207 (.635)			
National champion Postseason invitational champion Conference regular season champion Conference regular season and conference tournament champion Division regular season champion Division regular season and conference tournament champion Conference tournament champion

=== Football ===
Year	Team	Overall	Conference	Standing	Bowl/playoffs
Knox Old Siwash (Independent) (1918–1921)
1918	Knox	2–2–2			
1919	Knox	8–0			
1920	Knox	3–3–2			
1921	Knox	2–7			
Knox:		15–12–4			
USC Trojans (Pacific Coast Conference) (1941)
1941	USC	2–6–1	2–4–1	8th	
USC:		2–6–1	2–4–1		
Total:		17–18–5			

== See also ==
- List of NCAA Division I Men's Final Four appearances by coach
