= Wally Hood (American football) =

American football player and coach (1935–2017)

Biographical details
- Born: February 11, 1935; Cleveland, Ohio, U.S.
- Died: April 28, 2017 (aged 82)

Playing career
- 1953–1956: Ohio Wesleyan

Coaching career (HC unless noted)
- 1957: Mentor HS (OH) (assistant)
- 1958: Ashland HS (OH) (assistant)
- 1959–1961: Olmsted Falls HS (OH)
- 1962–1964: Defiance Falls HS (OH)
- 1965–1966: Cuyahoga Falls HS (OH)
- 1967–?: Baldwin–Wallace (assistant)
- 1973: Colgate (assistant)
- 1974–1983: Ohio Northern
- 1984–1991: Fairmont State
- 1995–2000: Otterbein

Head coaching record
- Overall: 112–112–8 (college)
- Tournaments: 0–1 (NAIA D-I playoffs)

Accomplishments and honors

Championships
- 1 WVIAC (1988); 1 OAC Blue Division (1982)

Awards
- 2× OAC Coach of the Year (1982, 2000)

A. Wallace Hood (February 11, 1935 – April 28, 2017) was an American football coach. A graduate of Ohio Wesleyan University, he served as the head football coach at Ohio Northern University in Ada, Ohio from 1974 to 1981, Fairmont State University in Fairmont, West Virginia from 1984 to 1991, and Otterbein University from 1995 to 2000, compiling a career college football coaching record of 112–112–8.

== Head coaching record ==
=== College ===
Year	Team	Overall	Conference	Standing	Bowl/playoffs
Ohio Northern Polar Bears (Ohio Athletic Conference) (1974–1983)
1974	Ohio Northern	2–7	NA	NA	
1975	Ohio Northern	4–4–1	NA	NA	
1976	Ohio Northern	7–2	4–1	2nd (Red)	
1977	Ohio Northern	2–7	1–4	5th (Red)	
1978	Ohio Northern	5–4	3–2	T–2nd (Red)	
1979	Ohio Northern	5–3–1	3–2	T–3rd (Red)	
1980	Ohio Northern	6–2–1	4–2	T–2nd (Blue)	
1981	Ohio Northern	6–3	4–2	T–2nd (Blue)	
1982	Ohio Northern	6–3–1	4–0–1	1st (Blue)	
1983	Ohio Northern	5–4	3–2	3rd (Blue)	
Ohio Northern:		48–39–4	26–15–1		
Fairmont State Fighting Falcons (West Virginia Intercollegiate Athletic Conference) (1984–1991)
1984	Fairmont State	5–5	4–4	5th	
1985	Fairmont State	7–3	5–2	T–2nd	
1986	Fairmont State	6–4	5–2	T–2nd	
1987	Fairmont State	7–3	5–2	2nd	
1988	Fairmont State	7–2–2	5–0–2	1st	L NAIA Division I First Round
1989	Fairmont State	4–6	2–4	T–5th	
1990	Fairmont State	5–4–1	4–1–1	T–2nd	
1991	Fairmont State	1–8–1	1–5–1	7th	
Fairmont State:		42–35–4	31–20–4		
Otterbein Cardinals (Ohio Athletic Conference) (1995–2000)
1995	Otterbein	3–7	3–6	T–7th	
1996	Otterbein	2–8	2–7	T–7th	
1997	Otterbein	2–8	2–7	T–7th	
1998	Otterbein	4–6	3–6	7th	
1999	Otterbein	7–3	6–3	T–3rd	
2000	Otterbein	4–6	3–6	T–6th	
Otterbein:		22–38	19–35		
Total:		112–112–8			
National championship Conference title Conference division title or championship game berth
