= Wally Hood (outfielder) =

American baseball player (1895–1965)

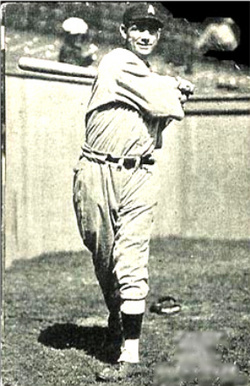
- Hood with the Los Angeles Angels, circa 1923 to 1928.
- Outfielder / First baseman
- Born: February 9, 1895; Whittier, California, U.S.
- Died: May 2, 1965 (aged 70); Hollywood, California, U.S.
- Batted: Right Threw: Right

MLB debut
- April 15, 1920, for the Brooklyn Robins

Last MLB appearance
- April 22, 1922, for the Brooklyn Robins

MLB statistics
- Batting average: .238
- Home runs: 1
- Runs batted in: 5
- Stats at Baseball Reference

Teams
- Brooklyn Robins (1920); Pittsburgh Pirates (1920); Brooklyn Robins (1921–1922)

Wallace James Hood Sr. (February 9, 1895 – May 2, 1965), was an American professional baseball player who played outfield for the Pittsburgh Pirates and the Brooklyn Robins from 1920 to 1922. He appeared in the baseball film Warming Up (1928), the first sound feature released by Paramount Pictures.

== Career ==
Hood played in the Major Leagues with National League teams, the Pittsburgh Pirates in 1920 and the Brooklyn Robins for two seasons, where he mostly played outfield and some first base.

He was sent back down to the minors, mainly playing for the Los Angeles Angels in the Pacific Coast League from 1923 to 1928. His last season, he played for the Sacramento Solons in 1930.

He then served as an umpire in the Pacific Coast League from 1935 to 1943.

== Military service ==
Prior to his professional baseball career, Hood served in the United States Army Air Forces during World War I. During his military service, he reached the rank of second lieutenant.

His son, Wally Hood, Jr. pitched for the New York Yankees in 1949 for two games.
