= College World Series =

Annual college baseball tournament held in Omaha, Nebraska

- Most recently played: 2026
- Latest champion: Oklahoma

The College World Series (CWS), officially the NCAA Men's College World Series (MCWS), is a baseball tournament held each June in Omaha, Nebraska. It is the culmination of the NCAA Division I baseball tournament—featuring 64 teams in the first round—which determines the champion of NCAA Division I level college baseball. The eight participating teams are split into two double-elimination brackets of four teams apiece, with the bracket winners playing in a best-of-three championship series.

== History ==
The first edition of the College World Series was held in 1947 at Hyames Field in Kalamazoo, Michigan. The tournament was held there again in 1948, but was moved to Lawrence Stadium in Wichita, Kansas, for the 1949 tournament. Since 1950, the College World Series (CWS) has been held in Omaha, Nebraska. It was held at Rosenblatt Stadium from 1950 through 2010; starting in 2011, it has been held at Charles Schwab Field Omaha (formerly TD Ameritrade Park Omaha). The name "College World Series" is derived from that of the Major League Baseball World Series championship; it is currently an MLB trademark licensed to the NCAA.

The event's official name was changed to "Men's College World Series" no later than 2008. The most recent hosting agreement between the NCAA and the city of Omaha and related entities, signed in that year, states, "The official name of the [championship] shall be the NCAA Men's College World Series". However, as of October 2021, the CWS logo still appeared on the NCAA's official D-I baseball tournament bracket, and on the front page of the NCAA's official CWS website, without the word "Men's". The NCAA has since added "Men's" to the event's logo, and both the NCAA and College World Series of Omaha, Inc. (CWS Omaha), the nonprofit group that organizes the event, now consistently use the phrase "Men's College World Series" to describe it.

On March 13, 2020, it was announced that the 2020 College World Series was canceled due to the COVID-19 pandemic, the first time in the event's history it had been canceled.

=== Contract extension ===
On June 10, 2008, the NCAA and CWS Omaha announced a new 25-year contract extension, keeping the MCWS in Omaha through 2035. A memorandum of understanding had been reached by all parties on April 30.

The currently binding contract began in 2011, the same year the tournament moved from Johnny Rosenblatt Stadium to the venue now known as Charles Schwab Field Omaha, a new ballpark across from CHI Health Center Omaha.

=== Format history and changes ===
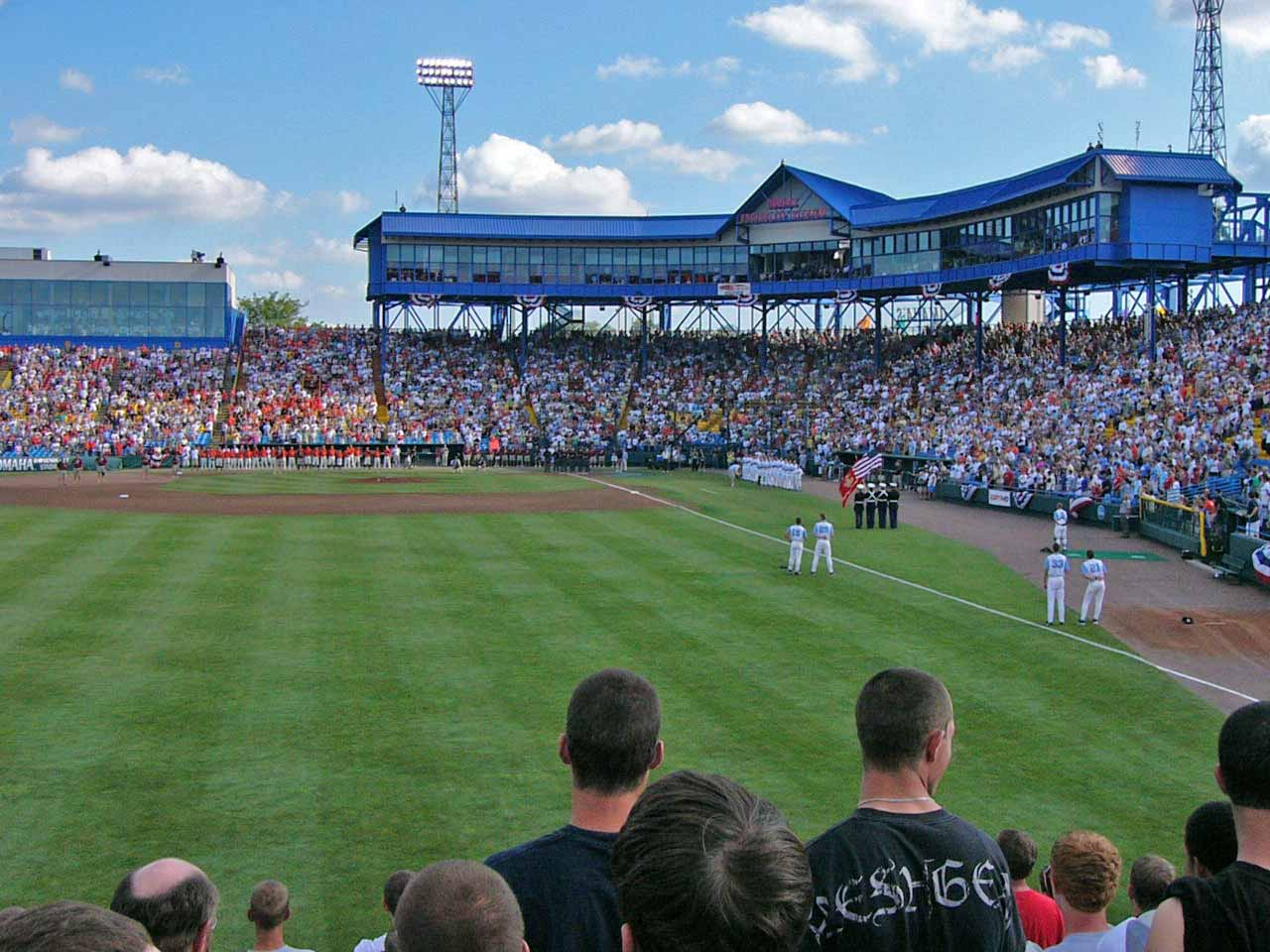
2006 College World Series Championship game (University of North Carolina versus Oregon State University) at Rosenblatt Stadium in Omaha, Nebraska.

- 1947 – Eight teams were divided into two, four-team, single-elimination playoffs. The two winners then met in a best-of-three final in Kalamazoo, Michigan.
- 1948 – Similar to 1947, but the two, four-team playoffs were changed to double-elimination tournaments. The two winners continued to meet in a best-of-three final in Kalamazoo. The teams were selected from the NCAA's eight districts, with a local committee choosing its representative based on their own criteria, which might or might not include committee selections, conference champions, and district playoffs.
- 1949 – The final was expanded to a four-team, double-elimination format and the site changed to Wichita, Kansas. Eight teams began the playoffs with the four finalists decided by a best-of-three district format.
- 1950–1953 – An eight-team, double-elimination format for the College World Series coincided with the move to Omaha, Nebraska, in 1950. A national baseball committee chose one team from each of the eight NCAA districts.
- 1954–1975 – Preliminary rounds determined the eight CWS teams, and the total number of teams in the preliminary round ranged from 21 to 32. The format of the CWS remained the same as 1950.
- 1976–1981 – The number of preliminary-round teams was increased to 34.
- 1982–1984 – The number of preliminary-round teams was increased to 36.
- 1985 – The number of preliminary-round teams was increased to 38.
- 1986 – The number of preliminary-round teams was increased to 40.
- 1987 – The number of preliminary-round teams was increased to 48, with teams split into eight, six-team regionals. The regionals were a test of endurance, as teams had to win at least four games over four days, sometimes five if a team dropped into the loser's bracket, placing a premium on pitching. In the last two years of the six-team regional format, the eventual CWS champion – LSU in 1997 and Southern California in 1998 – had to battle back from the loser's bracket in the regional to advance to Omaha. Unlike the current 64 team tournament, the CWS pairings were set after the regional tournaments.
- 1988–1998 – The format for the CWS was changed for the first time since 1950 with the 1988 College World Series, when the tournament was divided into 2 four-team double-elimination brackets, with the survivors of each bracket playing in a single championship game. The single-game championship was designed for network television, with the final game on CBS on a Saturday afternoon.
- 1999–2002 – With some 293 Division I teams playing, the NCAA expanded the overall tournament to a 64-team field in 1999. Teams were divided into 16 four-team double-elimination regionals. The regional winners advanced to the Super Regional round, which had 8 best-of-three series to advance to the CWS. Within each region, teams were seeded 1 to 4. Additionally, the top 8 teams in the tournament were given "national seeds" and placed in different Super Regionals so no national seeds could meet before the CWS. The 64-team bracket was set at the beginning of the championship and teams are not reseeded for the CWS. Since the 1999 College World Series, the four-team brackets in the CWS have been determined by the results of super-regional play, much like the NCAA basketball tournament.
- 2003–2017 – The championship final became a best-of-three series between the two four-team bracket winners, with games scheduled for three consecutive evenings. In the results shown below, Score indicates the score of the championship game(s) only. In 2008, the start of the CWS was moved back one day, and an extra day of rest was added in between bracket play and the championship series.
- 2018–2026 – The number of national seeds increased from 8 to 16. Each Super Regional featured the winners of regionals in which the numerical sum of those regions' national seeds totaled 17 (1 vs. 16, 2 vs. 15, etc.). No other format changes were made.
- 2026-present – The baseball selection committee changed the format so that the number of national seeds was shifted from 16 to 32, with each team outside of the top 16 grouped based on location. This change doesn't alter the structure of the event, as 16 four-team regionals are still featured.

== Results ==
Year	Champion	Coach	Score	Runner-up	Most Outstanding Player	Stadium	City
1947	California	Clint Evans	17–8, 8–7	Yale		Hyames Field	Kalamazoo, MI
1948	USC	Sam Barry	3–1, 3–8, 9–2	Yale		Hyames Field	Kalamazoo, MI
1949	Texas	Bibb Falk	10–3	Wake Forest	Tom Hamilton, Texas	Lawrence–Dumont Stadium	Wichita, KS
1950	Texas (2)	Bibb Falk	3–0	Washington State	Ray VanCleef, Rutgers	Omaha Municipal Stadium	Omaha, NE
1951	Oklahoma	Jack Baer	3–2	Tennessee	Sidney Hatfield, Tennessee	Omaha Municipal Stadium	Omaha, NE
1952	Holy Cross	Jack Barry	8–4	Missouri	James O'Neill, Holy Cross	Omaha Municipal Stadium	Omaha, NE
1953	Michigan	Ray Fisher	7–5	Texas	J.L. Smith, Texas	Omaha Municipal Stadium	Omaha, NE
1954	Missouri	Hi Simmons	4–1	Rollins	Tom Yewcic, Michigan State	Omaha Municipal Stadium	Omaha, NE
1955	Wake Forest	Taylor Sanford	7–6	Western Michigan	Tom Borland, Oklahoma A&M	Omaha Municipal Stadium	Omaha, NE
1956	Minnesota	Dick Siebert	12–1	Arizona	Jerry Thomas, Minnesota	Omaha Municipal Stadium	Omaha, NE
1957	California (2)	George Wolfman	1–0	Penn State	Cal Emery, Penn State	Omaha Municipal Stadium	Omaha, NE
1958	USC (2)	Rod Dedeaux	8–7	Missouri	Bill Thom, USC	Omaha Municipal Stadium	Omaha, NE
1959	Oklahoma State	Toby Greene	5–3	Arizona	Jim Dobson, Oklahoma State	Omaha Municipal Stadium	Omaha, NE
1960	Minnesota (2)	Dick Siebert	2–1	USC	John Erickson, Minnesota	Omaha Municipal Stadium	Omaha, NE
1961	USC (3)	Rod Dedeaux	1–0	Oklahoma State	Littleton Fowler, Oklahoma State	Omaha Municipal Stadium	Omaha, NE
1962	Michigan (2)	Don Lund	5–4	Santa Clara	Bob Garibaldi, Santa Clara	Omaha Municipal Stadium	Omaha, NE
1963	USC (4)	Rod Dedeaux	5–2	Arizona	Bud Hollowell, USC	Omaha Municipal Stadium	Omaha, NE
1964	Minnesota (3)	Dick Siebert	5–1	Missouri	Joe Ferris, Maine	Johnny Rosenblatt Stadium	Omaha, NE
1965	Arizona State	Bobby Winkles	2–1	Ohio State	Sal Bando, Arizona State	Johnny Rosenblatt Stadium	Omaha, NE
1966	Ohio State	Marty Karow	8–2	Oklahoma State	Steve Arlin, Ohio State	Johnny Rosenblatt Stadium	Omaha, NE
1967	Arizona State (2)	Bobby Winkles	11–2	Houston	Ron Davini, Arizona State	Johnny Rosenblatt Stadium	Omaha, NE
1968	USC (5)	Rod Dedeaux	4–3	Southern Illinois	Bill Seinsoth, USC	Johnny Rosenblatt Stadium	Omaha, NE
1969	Arizona State (3)	Bobby Winkles	10–1	Tulsa	John Dolinsek, Arizona State	Johnny Rosenblatt Stadium	Omaha, NE
1970	USC (6)	Rod Dedeaux	2–1	Florida State	Gene Ammann, Florida State	Johnny Rosenblatt Stadium	Omaha, NE
1971	USC (7)	Rod Dedeaux	7–2	Southern Illinois	Jerry Tabb, Tulsa	Johnny Rosenblatt Stadium	Omaha, NE
1972	USC (8)	Rod Dedeaux	1–0	Arizona State	Russ McQueen, USC	Johnny Rosenblatt Stadium	Omaha, NE
1973	USC (9)	Rod Dedeaux	4–3	Arizona State	Dave Winfield, Minnesota	Johnny Rosenblatt Stadium	Omaha, NE
1974	USC (10)	Rod Dedeaux	7–3	Miami (FL)	George Milke, USC	Johnny Rosenblatt Stadium	Omaha, NE
1975	Texas (3)	Cliff Gustafson	5–1	South Carolina	Mickey Reichenbach, Texas	Johnny Rosenblatt Stadium	Omaha, NE
1976	Arizona	Jerry Kindall	7–1	Eastern Michigan	Steve Powers, Arizona	Johnny Rosenblatt Stadium	Omaha, NE
1977	Arizona State (4)	Jim Brock	2–1	South Carolina	Bob Horner, Arizona State	Johnny Rosenblatt Stadium	Omaha, NE
1978	USC (11)	Rod Dedeaux	10–3	Arizona State	Rod Boxberger, USC	Johnny Rosenblatt Stadium	Omaha, NE
1979	Cal State Fullerton	Augie Garrido	2–1	Arkansas	Tony Hudson, Cal State Fullerton	Johnny Rosenblatt Stadium	Omaha, NE
1980	Arizona (2)	Jerry Kindall	5–3	Hawaii	Terry Francona, Arizona	Johnny Rosenblatt Stadium	Omaha, NE
1981	Arizona State (5)	Jim Brock	7–4	Oklahoma State	Stan Holmes, Arizona State	Johnny Rosenblatt Stadium	Omaha, NE
1982	Miami (FL)	Ron Fraser	9–3	Wichita State	Dan Smith, Miami (FL)	Johnny Rosenblatt Stadium	Omaha, NE
1983	Texas (4)	Cliff Gustafson	4–3	Alabama	Calvin Schiraldi, Texas	Johnny Rosenblatt Stadium	Omaha, NE
1984	Cal State Fullerton (2)	Augie Garrido	3–1	Texas	John Fishel, Cal State Fullerton	Johnny Rosenblatt Stadium	Omaha, NE
1985	Miami (FL) (2)	Ron Fraser	10–6	Texas	Greg Ellena, Miami (FL)	Johnny Rosenblatt Stadium	Omaha, NE
1986	Arizona (3)	Jerry Kindall	10–2	Florida State	Mike Senne, Arizona	Johnny Rosenblatt Stadium	Omaha, NE
1987	Stanford	Mark Marquess	9–5	Oklahoma State	Paul Carey, Stanford	Johnny Rosenblatt Stadium	Omaha, NE
1988	Stanford (2)	Mark Marquess	9–4	Arizona State	Lee Plemel, Stanford	Johnny Rosenblatt Stadium	Omaha, NE
1989	Wichita State	Gene Stephenson	5–3	Texas	Greg Brummett, Wichita State	Johnny Rosenblatt Stadium	Omaha, NE
1990	Georgia	Steve Webber	2–1	Oklahoma State	Mike Rebhan, Georgia	Johnny Rosenblatt Stadium	Omaha, NE
1991	LSU	Skip Bertman	6–3	Wichita State	Gary Hymel, LSU	Johnny Rosenblatt Stadium	Omaha, NE
1992	Pepperdine	Andy Lopez	3–2	Cal State Fullerton	Phil Nevin, Cal State Fullerton	Johnny Rosenblatt Stadium	Omaha, NE
1993	LSU (2)	Skip Bertman	8–0	Wichita State	Todd Walker, LSU	Johnny Rosenblatt Stadium	Omaha, NE
1994	Oklahoma (2)	Larry Cochell	13–5	Georgia Tech	Chip Glass, Oklahoma	Johnny Rosenblatt Stadium	Omaha, NE
1995	Cal State Fullerton (3)	Augie Garrido	11–5	USC	Mark Kotsay, Cal State Fullerton	Johnny Rosenblatt Stadium	Omaha, NE
1996	LSU (3)	Skip Bertman	9–8	Miami (FL)	Pat Burrell, Miami (FL)	Johnny Rosenblatt Stadium	Omaha, NE
1997	LSU (4)	Skip Bertman	13–6	Alabama	Brandon Larson, LSU	Johnny Rosenblatt Stadium	Omaha, NE
1998	USC (12)	Mike Gillespie	21–14	Arizona State	Wes Rachels, USC	Johnny Rosenblatt Stadium	Omaha, NE
1999	Miami (FL) (3)	Jim Morris	6–5	Florida State	Marshall McDougall, Florida State	Johnny Rosenblatt Stadium	Omaha, NE
2000	LSU (5)	Skip Bertman	6–5	Stanford	Trey Hodges, LSU	Johnny Rosenblatt Stadium	Omaha, NE
2001	Miami (FL) (4)	Jim Morris	12–1	Stanford	Charlton Jimerson, Miami (FL)	Johnny Rosenblatt Stadium	Omaha, NE
2002	Texas (5)	Augie Garrido	12–6	South Carolina	Huston Street, Texas	Johnny Rosenblatt Stadium	Omaha, NE
2003	Rice	Wayne Graham	4–3^{10}, 3–8, 14–2	Stanford	John Hudgins, Stanford	Johnny Rosenblatt Stadium	Omaha, NE
2004	Cal State Fullerton (4)	George Horton	6–4, 3–2	Texas	Jason Windsor, Cal State Fullerton	Johnny Rosenblatt Stadium	Omaha, NE
2005	Texas (6)	Augie Garrido	4–2, 6–2	Florida	David Maroul, Texas	Johnny Rosenblatt Stadium	Omaha, NE
2006	Oregon State	Pat Casey	3–4, 11–7, 3–2	North Carolina	Jonah Nickerson, Oregon State	Johnny Rosenblatt Stadium	Omaha, NE
2007	Oregon State (2)	Pat Casey	11–4, 9–3	North Carolina	Jorge Luis Reyes, Oregon State	Johnny Rosenblatt Stadium	Omaha, NE
2008	Fresno State	Mike Batesole	6–7, 19–10, 6–1	Georgia	Tommy Mendonca, Fresno State	Johnny Rosenblatt Stadium	Omaha, NE
2009	LSU (6)	Paul Mainieri	7–6, 1–5, 11–4	Texas	Jared Mitchell, LSU	Johnny Rosenblatt Stadium	Omaha, NE
2010	South Carolina	Ray Tanner	7–1, 2–1^{11}	UCLA	Jackie Bradley Jr., South Carolina	Johnny Rosenblatt Stadium	Omaha, NE
2011	South Carolina (2)	Ray Tanner	2–1^{11}, 5–2	Florida	Scott Wingo, South Carolina	TD Ameritrade Park	Omaha, NE
2012	Arizona (4)	Andy Lopez	5–1, 4–1	South Carolina	Rob Refsnyder, Arizona	TD Ameritrade Park	Omaha, NE
2013	UCLA	John Savage	3–1, 8–0	Mississippi State	Adam Plutko, UCLA	TD Ameritrade Park	Omaha, NE
2014	Vanderbilt	Tim Corbin	9–8, 2–7, 3–2	Virginia	Dansby Swanson, Vanderbilt	TD Ameritrade Park	Omaha, NE
2015	Virginia	Brian O'Connor	1–5, 3–0, 4–2	Vanderbilt	Josh Sborz, Virginia	TD Ameritrade Park	Omaha, NE
2016	Coastal Carolina	Gary Gilmore	0–3, 5–4, 4–3	Arizona	Andrew Beckwith, Coastal Carolina	TD Ameritrade Park	Omaha, NE
2017	Florida	Kevin O'Sullivan	4–3, 6–1	LSU	Alex Faedo, Florida	TD Ameritrade Park	Omaha, NE
2018	Oregon State (3)	Pat Casey	1–4, 5–3, 5–0	Arkansas	Adley Rutschman, Oregon State	TD Ameritrade Park	Omaha, NE
2019	Vanderbilt (2)	Tim Corbin	4–7, 4–1, 8–2	Michigan	Kumar Rocker, Vanderbilt	TD Ameritrade Park	Omaha, NE
2020	Canceled due to the COVID-19 pandemic						
2021	Mississippi State	Chris Lemonis	2–8, 13–2, 9–0	Vanderbilt	Will Bednar, Mississippi State	TD Ameritrade Park	Omaha, NE
2022	Ole Miss	Mike Bianco	10–3, 4–2	Oklahoma	Dylan DeLucia, Ole Miss	Charles Schwab Field	Omaha, NE
2023	LSU (7)	Jay Johnson	4–3^{11}, 4–24, 18–4	Florida	Paul Skenes, LSU	Charles Schwab Field	Omaha, NE
2024	Tennessee	Tony Vitello	5–9, 4–1, 6–5	Texas A&M	Dylan Dreiling, Tennessee	Charles Schwab Field	Omaha, NE
2025	LSU (8)	Jay Johnson	1–0, 5–3	Coastal Carolina	Kade Anderson, LSU	Charles Schwab Field	Omaha, NE
2026	Oklahoma (3)	Skip Johnson	9–3, 2-6, 13–2	North Carolina	Jaxon Willits, Oklahoma	Charles Schwab Field	Omaha, NE

=== Teams reaching the finals ===
Teams reaching the finals
Team	Titles	Runners-up	Finals Appearances
USC	12 (1948, 1958, 1961, 1963, 1968, 1970, 1971, 1972, 1973, 1974, 1978, 1998)	2 (1960, 1995)	14
LSU	8 (1991, 1993, 1996, 1997, 2000, 2009, 2023, 2025)	1 (2017)	9
Texas	6 (1949, 1950, 1975, 1983, 2002, 2005)	6 (1953, 1984, 1985, 1989, 2004, 2009)	12
Arizona State	5 (1965, 1967, 1969, 1977, 1981)	5 (1972, 1973, 1978, 1988, 1998)	10
Arizona	4 (1976, 1980, 1986, 2012)	4 (1956, 1959, 1963, 2016)	8
Miami (FL)	4 (1982, 1985, 1999, 2001)	2 (1974, 1996)	6
Cal State Fullerton	4 (1979, 1984, 1995, 2004)	1 (1992)	5
Oklahoma	3 (1951, 1994, 2026)	1 (2022)	4
Minnesota	3 (1956, 1960, 1964)		3
Oregon State	3 (2006, 2007, 2018)		3
South Carolina	2 (2010, 2011)	4 (1975, 1977, 2002, 2012)	6
Stanford	2 (1987, 1988)	3 (2000, 2001, 2003)	5
Vanderbilt	2 (2014, 2019)	2 (2015, 2021)	4
Michigan	2 (1953, 1962)	1 (2019)	3
California	2 (1947, 1957)		2
Oklahoma State	1 (1959)	5 (1961, 1966, 1981, 1987, 1990)	6
Missouri	1 (1954)	3 (1952, 1958, 1964)	4
Wichita State	1 (1989)	3 (1982, 1991, 1993)	4
Florida	1 (2017)	3 (2005, 2011, 2023)	4
Wake Forest	1 (1955)	1 (1949)	2
Ohio State	1 (1966)	1 (1965)	2
Georgia	1 (1990)	1 (2008)	2
UCLA	1 (2013)	1 (2010)	2
Virginia	1 (2015)	1 (2014)	2
Coastal Carolina	1 (2016)	1 (2025)	2
Mississippi State	1 (2021)	1 (2013)	2
Tennessee	1 (2024)	1 (1951)	2
Holy Cross	1 (1952)		1
Pepperdine	1 (1992)		1
Rice	1 (2003)		1
Fresno State	1 (2008)		1
Ole Miss	1 (2022)		1
Florida State		3 (1970, 1986, 1999)	3
North Carolina		3 (2006, 2007, 2026)	3
Yale		2 (1947, 1948)	2
Southern Illinois		2 (1968, 1971)	2
Arkansas		2 (1979, 2018)	2
Alabama		2 (1983, 1997)	2
Washington State		1 (1950)	1
Rollins		1 (1954)	1
Western Michigan		1 (1955)	1
Penn State		1 (1957)	1
Santa Clara		1 (1962)	1
Houston		1 (1967)	1
Tulsa		1 (1969)	1
Eastern Michigan		1 (1976)	1
Hawaii		1 (1980)	1
Georgia Tech		1 (1994)	1
Texas A&M		1 (2024)	1

=== Best performances by conference ===
Rank	Conference	Titles
1	Pac-12	18
1	Southeastern (SEC)	18
3	United Athletic (UAC)	7
4	Big Ten	6
4	PCC-CIBA	6
6	Independents	5
7	Big Eight	4
7	Southwest (SWC)	4
9	Atlantic Coast (ACC)	2
9	Big 12	2
9	Big West (BWC)	2
9	Big West (SCBA)	2
13	Big South (BSC)	1
13	Missouri Valley (MVC)	1
13	West Coast (WCC)	1

- CIBA was California Intercollegiate Baseball Association, which competed as a division under the Pacific Coast Conference while operating under a separate charter.
- Independents = Miami Hurricanes (4) and Holy Cross Crusaders (1)
- SCBA was Southern California Baseball Association (1977–84).
- The Big 12 does not claim any national championships, including baseball, that were won as members of the Big Eight and makes no claim to the history or records of the Big Eight.
- The United Athletic Conference, known before July 2026 as the Western Athletic Conference, claims 7 national championships in baseball by former members. There are no gaps in its existence; the UAC has existed continuously since its formation as the WAC in 1962.
- Coastal Carolina won the 2016 CWS as a member of the Big South Conference less than 24 hours before officially joining the Sun Belt Conference.
- Missouri won the 1954 CWS as a member of the Big Eight Conference.

== Awards ==
The College World Series Most Outstanding Player award is presented to the best player at each College World Series finals (first awarded in 1949).

An All-Tournament Team consisting of the best players of the tournament has also been announced for each tournament since 1958.

== Records and statistics ==
=== All-time record for champions ===
Team	Appearances	First	Last	Wins	Losses	Pct.	Titles
Texas	39	1949	2026	89	65	.578	6
Miami (FL)	25	1974	2016	48	42	.533	4
Arizona State	22	1964	2010	61	38	.616	5
Southern California	21	1948	2001	74	26	.740	12
LSU	20	1986	2025	51	29	.638	8
Oklahoma State (Note: Before 1957, Oklahoma State University was known as Oklahoma A&M.)	20	1954	2016	40	38	.513	1
Arizona	19	1954	2025	43	34	.558	4
Stanford	19	1953	2023	41	31	.569	2
Cal State Fullerton	18	1975	2017	34	31	.523	4
Florida	14	1988	2024	27	27	.500	1
Mississippi State	12	1971	2021	18	24	.429	1
South Carolina	11	1975	2012	32	20	.615	2
Oklahoma	12	1951	2026	20	17	.541	3
Michigan	8	1953	2019	16	14	.533	2
Oregon State	8	1952	2025	21	14	.600	3
Tennessee	7	1951	2024	14	13	.519	1
Wichita State	7	1982	1996	16	11	.593	1
Rice	7	1997	2008	10	13	.435	1
Virginia	7	2009	2024	13	14	.481	1
Missouri	6	1952	1964	18	11	.621	1
Ole Miss	7	1956	2026	10	13	.435	1
California	6	1947	2011	11	8	.579	2
Georgia	7	1987	2026	12	13	.480	1
UCLA	6	1969	2025	10	11	.476	1
Vanderbilt	5	2011	2021	20	10	.667	2
Minnesota	5	1956	1977	17	7	.708	3
Holy Cross	4	1952	1963	9	7	.563	1
Ohio State	4	1951	1967	9	7	.563	1
Fresno State	4	1959	2008	9	8	.529	1
Wake Forest	3	1949	2023	9	5	.643	1
Coastal Carolina	2	2016	2025	9	4	.692	1
Pepperdine	2	1979	1992	7	2	.778	1

== Most appearances without an MCWS championship ==
Top 10
Rank	School	Appearances	Wins	MCWS Winning %	Runner-up	Wins Per Appearance
1	Florida State	24	32	.400	3	1.33
2	North Carolina	13	23	.451	3	1.77
3	Arkansas	12	17	.436	2	1.42
3	Clemson	12	12	.333	0	1.00
5	Northern Colorado	10	3	.130	0	0.30
6	Texas A&M	8	8	.333	1	1.00
7	Maine	7	7	.222	0	0.57
8	Alabama	6	11	.478	2	1.83
8	Western Michigan	6	9	.429	1	1.50
8	St. John's (NY)	6	6	.333	0	1.00
8	Louisville	6	6	.333	0	1.00
8	Auburn	6	3	.231	0	0.50

== Most MCWS participants by one conference in a year ==
Minimum three participants
Number	Year	Conference	Programs	MCWS Winner
5	2026	SEC	Alabama, Georgia, Oklahoma, Ole Miss, Texas	Oklahoma
4	1997	SEC	Alabama, Auburn, LSU, Mississippi State	LSU
4	2004	SEC	Arkansas, Georgia, LSU, South Carolina	Cal State Fullerton
4	2006	ACC	Clemson, Georgia Tech, Miami (FL), North Carolina	Oregon State
4	2015	SEC	Arkansas, Florida, LSU, Vanderbilt	Virginia
4	2019	SEC	Arkansas, Auburn, Mississippi State, Vanderbilt	Vanderbilt
4	2022	SEC	Arkansas, Auburn, Ole Miss, Texas A&M (Note: In addition to the four then-current SEC members, two other participants in that edition, Oklahoma and Texas, announced in 2021 that they would join the SEC no later than 2025 (2026 season). Both ultimately joined the SEC for the 2025 season.)	Ole Miss
4	2024	ACC	Florida State, NC State, North Carolina, Virginia	Tennessee
4	2024	SEC	Florida, Kentucky, Tennessee, Texas A&M	Tennessee
3	1988	Pac-12	Arizona State, California, Stanford	Stanford
3	1990	SEC	Georgia, LSU, Mississippi State	Georgia
3	1996	SEC	Alabama, Florida, LSU	LSU
3	1998	SEC	Florida, LSU, Mississippi State	Southern California
3	2005	Big 12	Baylor, Nebraska, Texas	Texas
3	2008	ACC	Florida State, Miami (FL), North Carolina	Fresno State
3	2011	SEC	Florida, South Carolina, Vanderbilt	South Carolina
3	2012	SEC	Arkansas, Florida, South Carolina	Arizona
3	2014	Big 12	TCU, Texas, Texas Tech	Vanderbilt
3	2016	Big 12	Oklahoma State, TCU, Texas Tech	Coastal Carolina
3	2017	SEC	Florida, LSU, Texas A&M	Florida
3	2018	SEC	Arkansas, Florida, Mississippi State	Oregon State
3	2021	SEC	Vanderbilt, Mississippi State, Tennessee	Mississippi State
3	2023	SEC	Florida, LSU, Tennessee	LSU

== See also ==
- List of college baseball awards
- National Club Baseball Association
- NCAA Division II baseball tournament
- NCAA Division III baseball tournament
- Pre-NCAA baseball champion
- U.S. college baseball awards
- Women's College World Series
