= Frank Quinn (pitcher) =

American baseball player (1927–1993)

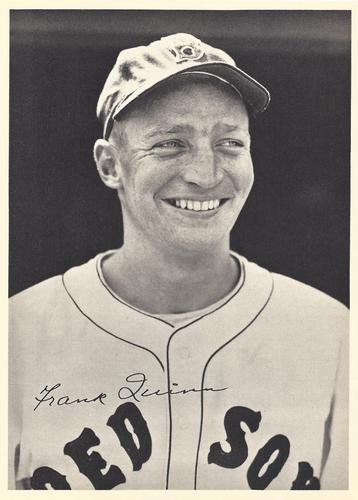
- Pitcher
- Born: November 27, 1927; Springfield, Massachusetts, U.S.
- Died: January 11, 1993 (aged 65); Boynton Beach, Florida, U.S.
- Batted: Right Threw: Right

MLB debut
- May 29, 1949, for the Boston Red Sox

Last MLB appearance
- April 26, 1950, for the Boston Red Sox

MLB statistics
- Win–loss record: 0–0
- Earned run average: 3.38
- Strikeouts: 4
- Stats at Baseball Reference

Teams
- Boston Red Sox (1949–1950)

Career highlights and awards
- National College Baseball Hall of Fame

Frank William Quinn (November 27, 1927 – January 11, 1993) was an American professional baseball pitcher who appeared in nine games as a relief pitcher in Major League Baseball as a member of the 1949 and 1950 Boston Red Sox. Born in Springfield, Massachusetts, he spent his teen years in Hartford, Connecticut, and matriculated at The Loomis School. He batted and threw right-handed, stood 6 feet 2 inches (1.88 m) tall and weighed 180 pounds (82 kg).

Before signing a bonus contract with the Red Sox in 1948, Quinn attended Yale University. He represented the Bulldogs in the first two editions of the College World Series in 1947 and 1948 alongside George H. W. Bush, the future 41st President of the United States.

He spent his second pro season on the roster of the MLB Red Sox, working in eight games between May 29 and August 25. In his best performance, on July 1 against the Philadelphia Athletics at Shibe Park, he allowed only one hit and no runs, with two strikeouts, in three full innings. It was a "mopup" assignment, with the Athletics winning the game, 11–5. Quinn also worked in one game early in 1950, on April 26; sixteen days later he was claimed on waivers by the Washington Senators, who sent him to the minor leagues. Plagued by a sore arm, he worked in only five more games before retiring from the mound.

In the majors, he recorded no decisions and no saves in his nine games; in 24 innings pitched, he allowed 20 hits, ten bases on balls and nine earned runs, striking out four batters. His career earned run average was 3.38.
