= 1948 Yale Bulldogs baseball team =

American college baseball season

1948 Yale Bulldogs baseball

NCAA tournament Eastern playoff champions College World Series runner-up
- Conference: Eastern Intercollegiate Baseball League
- Record: 21–9–1 (6–3 EIBL)
- Head coach: Ethan Allen (3rd year)
- Captain: George Bush
- Home stadium: Yale Field

1948 Eastern Intercollegiate Baseball League baseball standings
	Conf.						Overall
Team	W		L		T	PCT	W		L		T	PCT
Dartmouth ‍†‍‍	7	–	1	–	0	.875	12	–	4	–	1	.735
Navy ‍‍‍	7	–	2	–	0	.778	14	–	7	–	0	.667
Yale ‍‍‍^{y}	6	–	3	–	0	.667	21	–	9	–	1	.694
Army ‍‍‍	5	–	3	–	0	.625	16	–	7	–	0	.696
Cornell ‍‍‍	3	–	4	–	0	.429	8	–	9	–	0	.471
Columbia ‍‍‍	3	–	5	–	0	.375	7	–	5	–	0	.583
Penn ‍‍‍	3	–	5	–	0	.375	10	–	10	–	1	.500
Princeton ‍‍‍	3	–	6	–	0	.333	9	–	15	–	0	.375
Harvard ‍‍‍	2	–	4	–	0	.333	12	–	11	–	1	.521
Brown ‍‍‍	0	–	6	–	0	.000	2	–	11	–	0	.154
† – Conference champion y – Invited to the NCAA Tournament

The 1948 Yale Bulldogs baseball team represented the Yale University in the 1948 NCAA baseball season. The Bulldogs played their home games at Yale Field. The team was coached by Ethan Allen in his 3rd season at Yale.

The Bulldogs advanced to the College World Series, falling to the USC Trojans two games to one in the best of three series.

Future president George H. W. Bush was a third baseman and captain on the team.

== Roster ==
1948 Yale Bulldogs roster
Pitchers: James C. Duffus; Frank Quinn; Robert M. Goodyear; Austin A. Woodward; Catchers: Norm Felske; Frank H. Marshall; Bob Rosensweig	Infielders: George Bush; Richard Mathews; Arthur K. Moher; Delos G. Smith, Jr.	Outfielders: Jerry Breen; Art Fitzgerald; Thomas Redden; Richard M. Tettelbach	Position Unknown: Sidney A. Rosner

== Schedule ==
Legend
	Yale win
	Yale loss
	Tie
**Bold**	Yale team member
*	Non-Conference game

1948 Yale Bulldogs baseball game log
Regular season

April
Date	Opponent	Site/stadium	Score	Overall record	EIBL record
April 2	at North Carolina	Emerson Field • Chapel Hill, NC	**T** 7–7	0–0–1	
April 3	at NC State	Riddick Stadium • Raleigh, NC	**W** 9–6	1–0–1	
April 5	at Wake Forest	South Side Park • Winston-Salem, NC	**L** 0–2	1–1–1	
April 6	at Duke	Jack Coombs Field • Durham, NC	**L** 1–10	1–2–1	
April 7	at Maryland	College Park, MD	**W** 6–5	2–2–1	
April 8	at Lafayette	Fisher Field • Easton, PA	**L** 3–4	2–3–1	
April 17	at Navy	Annapolis, MD	**L** 0–2	2–4–1	0–1
April 20	Connecticut	Yale Field • New Haven, CT	**W** 7–0	3–4–1	
April 22	Boston College	Yale Field • New Haven, CT	**W** 3–1	4–4–1	
April 24	Amherst	Yale Field • New Haven, CT	**W** 3–0^{7}	5–4–1	
April 27	Springfield	Yale Field • New Haven, CT	**W** 1–0	6–4–1	
April 29	UMass	Yale Field • New Haven, CT	**W** 2–1	7–4–1	

May
Date	Opponent	Site/stadium	Score	Overall record	EIBL record
May 1	at Brown	Providence, RI	**W** 16–2	8–4–1	
May 5	Providence	Yale Field • New Haven, CT	**W** 22–4^{8}	9–4–1	
May 8	Penn	Yale Field • New Haven, CT	**W** 5–2	10–4–1	1–1
May 15	at Dartmouth	Hanover, NH	**W** 6–2	11–4–1	2–1
May 19	Trinity	Yale Field • New Haven, CT	**W** 7–6	12–4–1	
May 22	Army	Yale Field • New Haven, CT	**W** 1–0	13–4–1	
May 26	Holy Cross	Yale Field • New Haven, CT	**L** 1–4	13–5–1	
May 27	Columbia	Yale Field • New Haven, CT	**L** 0–2	13–6–1	2–2
May 29	at Cornell	Hoy Field • Ithaca, NY	**W** 4–3	14–6–1	3–2

June
Date	Opponent	Site/stadium	Score	Overall record	EIBL record
June 2	at Williams	Williamstown, MA	**W** 14–5	15–6–1	
June 5	Princeton	Yale Field • New Haven, CT	**W** 14–2	16–6–1	4–2
June 12	at Princeton	Princeton, NJ	**W** 7–5	17–6–1	5–2

Postseason

NCAA tournament: Eastern Playoff
Date	Opponent	Site/stadium	Score	Overall record	NCAAT record
June 15	vs. North Carolina	Winston-Salem, NC	**W** 6–1	18–6–1	1–0
June 16	vs. Lafayette	Winston-Salem, NC	**W** 11–2	19–6–1	2–0
June 17	vs. Lafayette	Winston-Salem, NC	**W** 4–3	20–6–1	3–0

June
Date	Opponent	Site/stadium	Score	Overall record	EIBL record
June 22	Harvard	Yale Field • New Haven, CT	**L** 0–2	20–7–1	6–3

NCAA tournament: College World Series
Date	Opponent	Site/stadium	Score	Overall record	CWS record
June 25	Southern California	Hyames Field • Kalamazoo, MI	**L** 1–3	20–8–1	0–1
June 26	Southern California	Hyames Field • Kalamazoo, MI	**W** 8-3	21-8–1	1–1
June 26	Southern California	Hyames Field • Kalamazoo, MI	**L** 3–9	21–9–1	1–2

== Awards and honors ==
Frank Quinn

- All-America First team

Richard Mathews

- All-America First team
