= Hank Workman =

American baseball player (1926–2020)

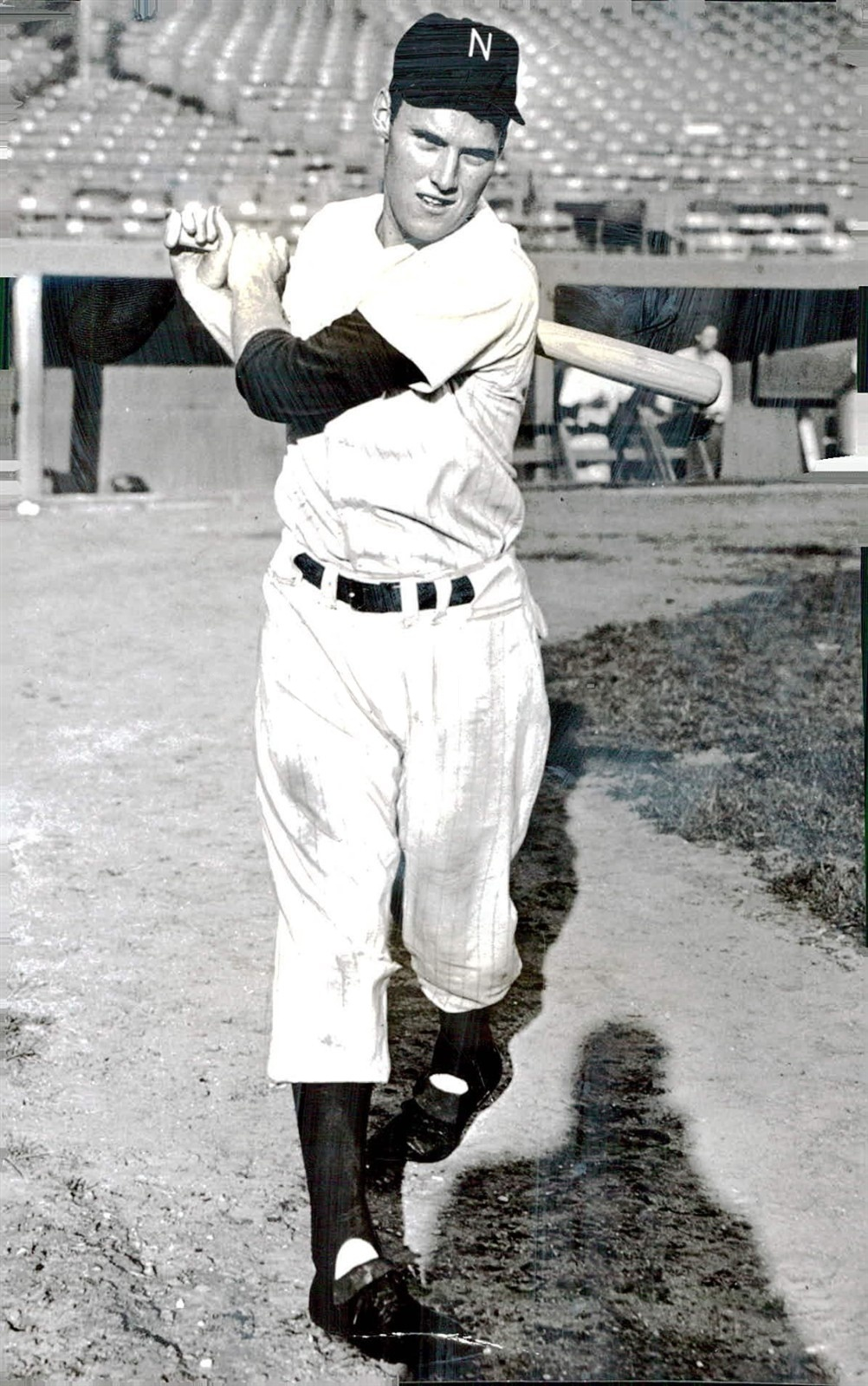
- Workman with the Kansas City Blues in 1949
- First baseman
- Born: February 5, 1926; Los Angeles, California, U.S.
- Died: March 16, 2020 (aged 94); Santa Monica, California, U.S.
- Batted: Left Threw: Right

MLB debut
- September 4, 1950, for the New York Yankees

Last MLB appearance
- October 1, 1950, for the New York Yankees

MLB statistics
- Games played: 2
- At bats: 5
- Hits: 1
- Stats at Baseball Reference

Teams
- New York Yankees (1950)

Henry Kilgariff Workman (February 5, 1926 – March 16, 2020) was an American professional baseball player who appeared in two games in Major League Baseball for the New York Yankees during the 1950 season. Workman was listed at 6 feet 1 inch (1.85 m) tall and 185 pounds (84 kg). He threw right-handed and batted left-handed.

== Early life ==
Born in Los Angeles, California, Workman attended the University of Southern California and was elected to the USC Athletic Hall of Fame in 2009. He was captain of the USC Trojans baseball team that won the 1948 College World Series, playing also on USC conference winners in 1946–47. Workman's father, Tom, also lettered in baseball at USC (in 1912).

Workman enlisted in the United States military, during World War II, in 1944 and was in the naval aviation training program when World War II ended. He went to Loyola Law School and then practiced law in Los Angeles.

== Career ==
In his brief big league career, Workman played one game as a first baseman and appeared in the other as a pinch hitter. He had one hit in five at bats—a single off Harry Taylor of the Boston Red Sox on October 1, 1950—for a .200 batting average. Workman replaced future Baseball Hall of Fame member Joe DiMaggio as the fourth batter in the lineup the day he played first base. He also played six years in minor league baseball, where he was primarily an outfielder, and in Cuba during the winter of 1952–53. Workman became a lawyer after his baseball career ended.

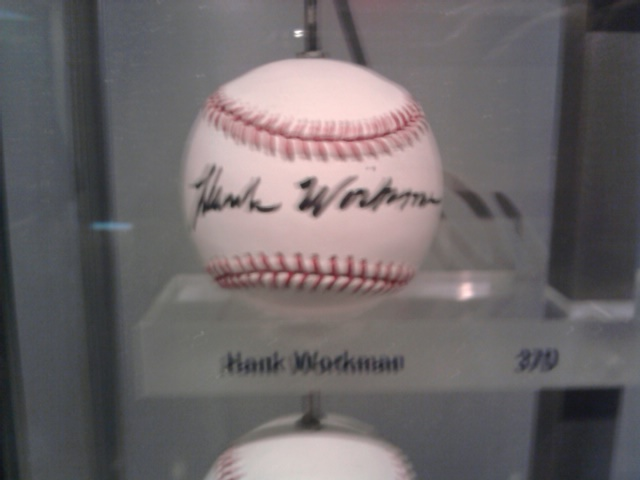
Hank Workman's signature

== Personal life ==
Workman's paternal grandfather was William H. Workman who was the mayor of Los Angeles, California from 1886 to 1888. He died on March 16, 2020, in Santa Monica, California.
