= Wally Hood (pitcher) =

American baseball player

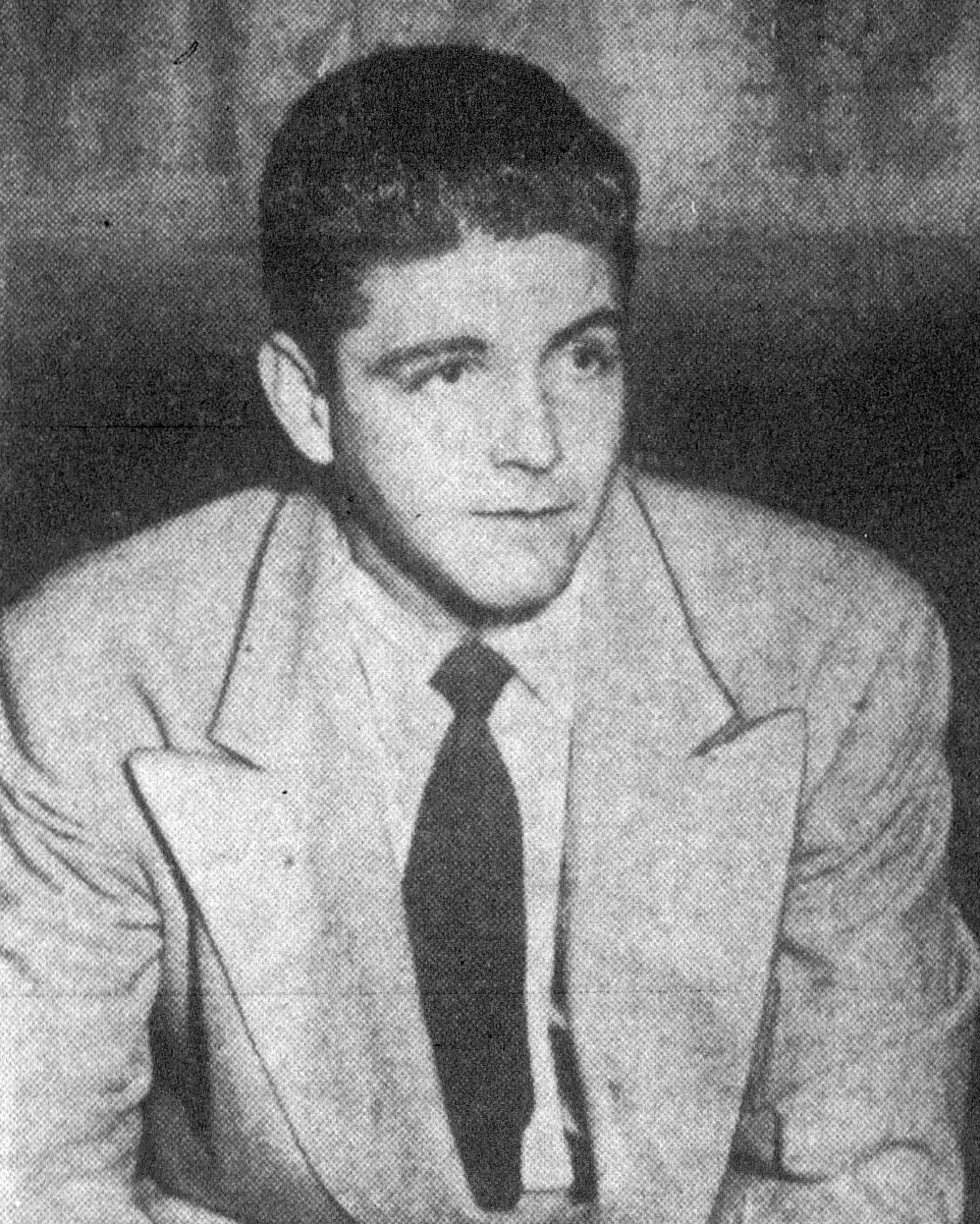
- Hood, circa 1950
- Pitcher
- Born: September 24, 1925; Los Angeles, California, U.S.
- Died: June 16, 2001 (aged 75); Glendale, California, U.S.
- Batted: Right Threw: Right

MLB debut
- September 23, 1949, for the New York Yankees

Last MLB appearance
- September 30, 1949, for the New York Yankees

MLB statistics
- Win–loss record: 0–0
- Earned run average: 0.00
- Strikeouts: 2

Teams
- New York Yankees (1949)

Wallace James Hood Jr. (September 24, 1925 – June 16, 2001) was an American professional baseball pitcher who appeared in two games in Major League Baseball for the New York Yankees in 1949. Born in Los Angeles, he threw and batted right-handed and was listed as 6 feet 1 inch (1.85 m) tall and 190 pounds (86 kg). His father, Wally Sr., a standout outfielder in the Pacific Coast League, played in 67 MLB games during the early 1920s.

Hood attended the University of Southern California, where he was a member of the USC Trojans' first national championship edition in 1948 and was selected to the All-America team. In two years of varsity baseball, he posted a 29–4 won–lost record, including a 21–2 mark in 1948. In 2019, Hood was inducted into the National College Baseball Hall of Fame.

Hood signed with the Yankees in 1948, and in his second pro season received his MLB audition in September 1949. He made two appearances in relief, compiling a 0–0 record with a 0.00 earned run average with no saves. In 21/3 innings pitched, he did not permit a hit and recorded two strikeouts, with one base on balls.

Hood returned to the minor leagues in 1950, where he concluded his baseball career in 1954.

== See also ==
- List of second-generation Major League Baseball players
