= Hyames Field =

Baseball stadium in Kalamazoo, Michigan

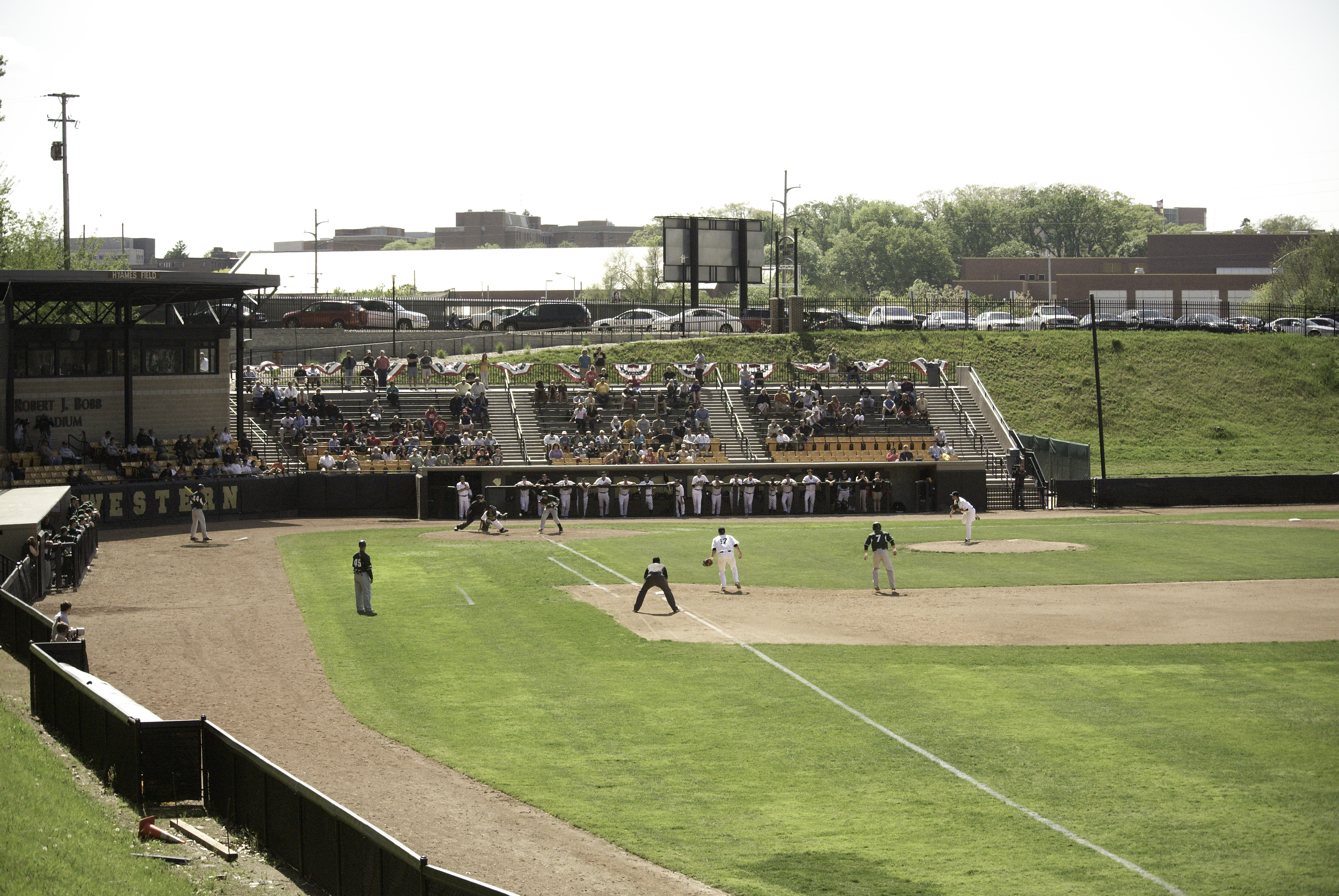
- A view of Hyames Field from the right field corner during a game in 2012

- Location in the United States
- Full name: Robert J. Bobb Stadium at Hyames Field
- Location: Kalamazoo, Michigan; United States
- Coordinates: 42°17′04″N 85°36′10″W
- Owner: Western Michigan University
- Operator: Western Michigan University
- Capacity: 1,500
- Scoreboard: Electronic
- Field size: LF-310' (top of fence measures 16'); Left Center - 375 ' Center Field - 395 ' Right Center - 375'; Right Field - 335'

Construction
- Opened: 1939
- Renovated: 2008–2010

Tenants
- Western Michigan Broncos (NCAA) (1939–present)

Robert J. Bobb Stadium at Hyames Field is a baseball stadium located in Kalamazoo, Michigan, United States, on the campus of Western Michigan University. It opened in 1939, and serves as the home field for the Western Michigan Broncos baseball program. The stadium hosted the inaugural College World Series in 1947 and again in 1948.

== History ==
Originally constructed in 1939, it was part of a $250,000 project that also included the construction of the adjacent Waldo Stadium, home of the WMU football team.

The baseball field was dedicated and opened in the spring of 1939, and was named for Judson Hyames, who had coached the baseball squads at WMU from 1922–36. He accumulated a record of 166–62–6, and had accomplished one of the more successful records in the region. Hyames also served as athletic director at Western Michigan. The stadium itself was renamed in 2008 after a $1 million donation by Robert J. Bobb.

Carved out of a hill alongside Stadium Drive, Hyames Field was able to offer a unique playing environment. Features include hill banks down both foul lines, in particular the right field side, which is an open grassy knoll popular with spectators. The original construction also included concrete seating behind home plate, along with restrooms, concessions, and storage facilities located beneath the seating. This structure had been completely covered by a permanent roof; however, the roof had fallen into disrepair in recent years and was removed in the winter of 2005. The 2006 baseball season continued without the roof, although the steel girders for it remained. Other renovations and additions over the years have included an electronic scoreboard, batting cages, and more effective turf management.

In 2008, Robert J. Bobb, chief executive officer of Cardinal Growth L.P. and a 1969 WMU alumnus, committed $1 million to the renovations of Hyames Field, which was later dedicated as "Robert J. Bobb Stadium at Hyames Field" on May 14, 2011. The project included grandstand restoration, the installation of chairback seating, construction of new walkways, dugouts, press box, two VIP suites, bathrooms and a concession area. Other major donors included members of the 1955 WMU baseball team and MLB executive and WMU alum Bill Lajoie.

== College World Series ==
At the time of construction, the facilities of Hyames Field were considered to be some of the best in the country. The site was the home of the first two College World Series in 1947 and 1948. The 1947 contest was particularly memorable, featuring future American League MVP Jackie Jensen of Cal in the outfield. In the same contest, future United States President George H. W. Bush played first base for the Yale squad. The CWS moved to Wichita, Kansas in 1949, and to Omaha, Nebraska in 1950, where it has been featured since.

== See also ==
- List of NCAA Division I baseball venues
