= 1963 NCAA University Division baseball rankings =

1963 NCAA University Division baseball season

Tournament

College World Series
- Champions: USC
- Runners-up: Arizona
- MOP: Bud Hollowell (USC)

Seasons
- ← 1962 1964 →

The following poll makes up the 1963 NCAA University Division baseball rankings. Collegiate Baseball Newspaper published its first human poll of the top 20 teams in college baseball in 1957, and expanded to rank the top 30 teams in 1961.

== Collegiate Baseball ==
Currently, only the final poll from the 1963 season is available.

Rank	Team
1	USC
2	Arizona
3	Missouri
4	Texas
5	Penn State
6	Florida State
7	Holy Cross
8	Western Michigan
9	Wake Forest
10	Oregon State
11	West Virginia
12	St. John's
13	Temple
14	Illinois
15	Notre Dame
16	Ithaca
17	Oregon
18	Cal Poly Pomona
19	Pepperdine
20	Arizona State
21	Auburn
22	Ole Miss
23	UCLA
24	Florida
25	Iowa
26	TCU
27	Minnesota
28	Ohio State
29	Providence
30	Boston College
