= 1963 College Baseball All-America Team =

This is a list of college baseball players named first team All-Americans for the 1963 NCAA University Division baseball season. From 1947 to 1963, the American Baseball Coaches Association was the only generally recognized All-America selector, so any player selected by the ABCA is considered a "consensus" All-American.

== Key ==
A	American Baseball Coaches Association
	Member of the National College Baseball Hall of Fame
	Consensus All-American – selected the ABCA

== All-Americans ==
Position	Name	School	#	A
Pitcher	Don Hagen	Occidental	1	✓
Pitcher	Eddie Jones	UConn	1	✓
Catcher	Jeff Torborg	Rutgers	1	✓
First baseman	Butch Thompson	Texas	1	✓
Second baseman	Jon Andersen	Minnesota	1	✓
Shortstop	Bill Bethea	Texas	1	✓
Third baseman	Tom Moore	Florida	1	✓
Outfielder	Mike Augustine	Florida State	1	✓
Outfielder	Bill Scripture	Wake Forest	1	✓
Outfielder	Bobby Stewart	Richmond	1	✓

== See also ==
- List of college baseball awards
