= Baseball at the 1964 Summer Olympics =

Demonstration sport

Tournament details
- Country: Japan
- City: Tokyo
- Venue(s): Meiji Jingu Stadium
- Dates: October 11, 1964
- Teams: 2

Final positions
- Champions: United States
- Runners-up: Japan

Tournament statistics
- Games played: 2

Baseball at the 1964 Summer Olympics was a demonstration sport at the Tokyo games. It would become an official sport 28 years later at the 1992 Summer Olympics. It was the fifth time a baseball exhibition was held at the Olympics. The collegiate United States team played two games against two different Samurai Japan lineups – one a collegiate team, the other made up of adult players from the amateur Japanese Industrial League.

== Venue ==
The game was played on October 11, 1964, at Meiji Jingu Stadium in Tokyo.

Tokyo	Meiji Jingu Stadium is located in Japan
Meiji Jingu Stadium	Meiji Jingu Stadium is located in Japan
Capacity: 58,000	Meiji Jingu Stadium is located in Japan

== Teams ==
The U.S. team was made up of college baseball players—including eight future Major League Baseball players–and was coached by Rod Dedeaux, the longtime head baseball coach at the University of Southern California (USC). Dedeaux brought an impressive pedigree to the U.S. side; he had already won four College World Series titles with the Trojans, most recently in 1963. Future major league players on the U.S. team were pitchers Alan Closter, Dick Joyce, and Chuck Dobson; catchers Jim Hibbs and Ken Suarez; outfielder Shaun Fitzmaurice; first baseman Mike Epstein; and second baseman Gary Sutherland. Fitzmaurice hit a home run on the first pitch of the game. Most of the other players on the roster went on to play baseball professionally in the minor leagues.

The Japanese collegiate team also had several future Nippon Professional Baseball players, including Tokuji Nagaike, a two-time Pacific League MVP with the Hankyu Braves, and Shozo Doi, a four-time NPB All-Star with the Yomiuri Giants.

=== Rosters ===
United States

United States – 1964 Summer Olympics roster
Players		Coaches
Pitchers: George Bosworth (Hope); Bill Brasher (UCLA); Alan Closter (Iowa State); Chuck Dobson (Kansas); Dick Joyce (Holy Cross); Walter Peterson (USC); Keith Weber (Missouri)	Catchers: Jim Hibbs (Stanford); Bud Hollowell (USC); Ken Suarez (Florida State); Infielders: Tommy Keyes (Mississippi); Larry Sandel (USC); Gary Sutherland (USC); Jim Vopicka (Illinois); Outfielders: Brian Edgerly (Colgate); Mike Epstein (California Berkeley); Shaun Fitzmaurice (Notre Dame); Bob Karlblom (Augustana); Don Novick (NYU)	Manager: Rod Dedeaux (USC); Coaches: Dutch Fehring (Stanford, asst.); Lee Eilbracht (Illinois, asst.)

Japan

Japan – 1964 Summer Olympics collegiate roster
Players		Coaches
Pitchers: Masahiko Morita (Komazawa); Hisatoshi Ito (Komazawa); Yoshitaka Kihara (Hosei); Taisuke Watanabe (Keio)	Catchers: Hiroshi Shintaku (Komazawa); Fumio Sato (Komazawa); Infielders: Shigezo Shintani (Komazawa); Takeo Shimizu (Komazawa); Kazuaki Goto (Komazawa); Takeshi Oshita (Komazawa); Isao Hirono (Keio); Shiro Takegami (Chuo); Shozo Doi (Rikkyo); Outfielders: Yoshiro Takeno (Komazawa); Takao Ota (Komazawa); Toshihiko Fujita (Komazawa); Tamio Suetsugu (Chuo); Tokuji Nagaike (Hosei)	Manager: Akihito Kobayashi (Komazawa); Coaches: Yukichi Maeda (Keio, asst.)

Japan – 1964 Summer Olympics adult amateur roster
Players		Coaches
Pitchers: Akira Sato (Nippon Express); Akira Tanaka (Nippon Express); Shigeo Kondo (Nippon Columbia); Tadahiko Kiyosawa (Sumitomo Metal)	Catchers: Masataka Arai (Nippon Express); Koji Hirose (Nippon Oil); Infielders: Hiroshi Muraki (Nippon Express); Yongsan Road (Nippon Express); Takao Nagano (Nippon Express); Masashi Takenouchi (Nippon Express); Ryosuke Kondo (Nippon Express); Masaki Taura (Nippon Kokan); Yoshiaki Miyawaki (Kaneka Kanekalon); Outfielders: Hiroshi Takeda (Nippon Express); Shuji Kobori (Nippon Express); Hiroshi Totsuka (Nippon Express); Masaji Sato (Nippon Kokan); Michiaki Edamatsu (Nippon Oil)	Manager: Seiji Inaba (Nippon Express); Coaches: Iwao Kobayashi (Nippon Express, asst.)

== Games ==
Prior to the game, players held their own "opening ceremony", as they had not been included in the official opening of the Olympiad, due to baseball's status as a demonstration sport. Additionally, the U.S. baseball team was housed at a YMCA rather than in the Olympic Village. Outside of the Olympics, contemporary news reports note that the U.S. baseball team played a series of exhibition games in Japan and South Korea.

The first game, against the Japanese collegiate team, was a 2-2 draw after nine innings, while the second game, against the Japanese adult amateurs, was won by the American team, 3-0. Approximately 50,000 fans watched the games.

== Results ==
October 11, at Meiji Jingu Stadium
Team	1	2	3	4	5	6	7	8	9	R
United States	1	0	0	0	0	0	0	0	1	2
Japan (collegiate)	1	0	0	0	1	0	0	0	0	2

October 11, at Meiji Jingu Stadium
Team	1	2	3	4	5	6	7	8	9	R
United States	0	0	0	2	0	1	0	0	0	3
Japan	0	0	0	0	0	0	0	0	0	0

== Sources ==
- Cava, Pete (Summer 1992). "Baseball in the Olympics". Citius, Altius, Fortius. 1 (1): 7–15.
