= 1963 Arizona Wildcats baseball team =

American college baseball season

1963 Arizona Wildcats baseball

WAC champion District 7 champion

College World Series, 2nd
- Conference: Western Athletic Conference
- Record: 39–17 (18–1 WAC)
- Head coach: Frank Sancet (14th year)
- Home stadium: UA Field

1963 Western Athletic Conference baseball standings
	Conf.				Overall
Team	W		L	PCT	W		L	PCT
Northern
BYU ^{x}‍‍‍	7	–	1	.875	22	–	12	.647
Utah ‍‍‍	4	–	4	.500	15	–	14	.517
Wyoming ‍‍‍	1	–	7	.125	9	–	21	.300
Southern
No. 2 Arizona ^{x}‍‍‡‍^{y}	8	–	4	.667	39	–	17	.696
No. 20 Arizona State ‍‍‍	7	–	5	.583	34	–	13	.723
New Mexico ‍‍‍	3	–	9	.250	18	–	16	.529
x – Division champion ‡ – Playoff champion y – Invited to the NCAA tournament As of June 30, 1963; Rankings from Collegiate Baseball

The 1963 Arizona Wildcats baseball team represented the University of Arizona in the 1963 NCAA University Division baseball season. The Wildcats played their home games at UA Field and Hi Corbett Field in Tucson, Arizona. The team was coached by Frank Sancet in his fourteenth season at Arizona.

The Wildcats reached the College World Series, finishing as the runner up to Southern California.

== Roster ==
1963 Arizona Wildcats roster
- Agustine Acuna; - Hector Barnetche; - Edwin Bayne; - William Henry Brown Jr.; - Robert Gauna; - Grant B. Hawgood; - William W. Jameson; - Aurelio Martinez; - Robert G. Maxwell	- James Craig Morrison; - Richard A. Patera; - Steve Priborsky; - William R. Reynolds; - Morton R. Saull; - Charles Schoenberg; - Sherwin Newton Scott; - Leo R. Tosto	Pitchers: - John G. Fouse; - Charles Douglas Holliker; - Jim Nichols; Infielders: - Ronald M. Theobald; Catchers Outfielders

== Schedule ==
Legend
Arizona win
Arizona loss

1963 Arizona Wildcats baseball game log
Regular season

March
Date	Opponent	Site/stadium	Score	Overall record	WAC record
Mar 1	Long Beach State*	Tucson, AZ	W 8–2	1–0	
Mar 2	Long Beach State*	Tucson, AZ	W 17–7	2–0	
Mar 2	Long Beach State*	Tucson, AZ	W 7–6	3–0	
Mar 8	UCLA*	Tucson, AZ	W 7–3	4–0	
Mar 9	UCLA*	Tucson, AZ	L 9–10	4–1	
Mar 15	Colorado State*	Tucson, AZ	W 9–7	5–1	
Mar 16	Colorado State*	Tucson, AZ	W 9–8	6–1	
Mar 18	Oregon State*	Tucson, AZ	L 4–7	6–2	
Mar 19	Oregon State*	Tucson, AZ	L 3–4	6–3	
Mar 20	Oregon State*	Tucson, AZ	W 3–2	7–3	
Mar 21	Utah*	Tucson, AZ	W 9–2	8–3	
Mar 22	Utah*	Tucson, AZ	W 10–1	9–3	
Mar 23	Utah*	Tucson, AZ	W 13–1	10–3	
Mar 23	Utah*	Tucson, AZ	W 8–0	11–3	
Mar 25	Oklahoma*	Tucson, AZ	W 10–7	12–3	
Mar 26	Oklahoma*	Tucson, AZ	L 5–9	12–4	
Mar 29	Sul Ross*	Tucson, AZ	W 9–4	13–4	
Mar 30	Sul Ross*	Tucson, AZ	L 0–12	13–5	

April
Date	Opponent	Site/stadium	Score	Overall record	WAC record
Apr 1	Wyoming*	L 0–3	13–6		
Apr 2	vs Wyoming*	Nogales, AZ	W 8–1	14–6	
Apr 3	Wyoming*	Tucson, AZ	W 14–4	15–6	
Apr 5	Arizona State	Tucson, AZ	W 6–2	16–6	1–0
Apr 6	Arizona State	Tucson, AZ	W 9–8	17–6	2–0
Apr 6	Arizona State	Tucson, AZ	L 0–2	17–7	2–1
Apr 8	Michigan*	Tucson, AZ	L 3–9	17–8	
Apr 9	Michigan*	Tucson, AZ	L 4–6	17–9	
Apr 10	Michigan*	Tucson, AZ	W 11–4	18–9	
Apr 11	Michigan*	Tucson, AZ	W 16–0	19–9	
Apr 13	Michigan*	Tucson, AZ	W 6–4	20–9	
Apr 13	Michigan*	Tucson, AZ	L 3–11	20–10	
Apr 19	New Mexico	Tucson, AZ	W 9–2	21–10	3–1
Apr 20	New Mexico	Tucson, AZ	W 8–0	22–10	4–1
Apr 21	New Mexico	Tucson, AZ	W 6–2	23–10	5–1
Apr 22	Northern Arizona*	Tucson, AZ	L 0–3	23–11	
Apr 23	Northern Arizona*	Tucson, AZ	W 7–3	24–11	
Apr 27	at UCLA*	Joe E. Brown Field • Los Angeles, CA	L 1–6	24–12	
Apr 29	at Cal State Los Angeles*	Los Angeles, CA	W 3–2	25–12	

May
Date	Opponent	Site/stadium	Score	Overall record	WAC record
May 3	at Arizona State	Phoenix, AZ	L 2–3	25–13	5–2
May 4	at Arizona State	Phoenix, AZ	W 3–2	26–13	6–2
May 4	at Arizona State	Phoenix, AZ	W 9–5	27–13	7–2
May 9	Cal State Los Angeles*	Tucson, AZ	W 8–5	28–13	
May 10	Cal State Los Angeles*	Tucson, AZ	W 5–3	29–13	
May 17	at New Mexico	Albuquerque, NM	L 3–12	29–14	7–3
May 18	at New Mexico	Albuquerque, NM	W 18–7	30–14	8–3
May 18	at New Mexico	Albuquerque, NM	L 2–3	30–15	8–4

Postseason

WAC playoffs
Date	Opponent	Site/stadium	Score	Overall record	WACCS Record
May 24	BYU	Tucson, AZ	W 6–3	31–15	1–0
May 25	BYU	Tucson, AZ	W 5–0	32–15	2–0

NCAA District 7 playoff
Date	Opponent	Site/stadium	Score	Overall record	NCAAT record
May 31	Colorado State	Tucson, AZ	W 13–0	33–15	1–0
June 1	Colorado State	Tucson, AZ	W 10–0	34–15	2–0
June 1	Colorado State	Tucson, AZ	W 14–10	35–15	3–0

College World Series
Date	Opponent	Site/stadium	Score	Overall record	CWS record
June 10	Penn State	Johnny Rosenblatt Stadium • Omaha, NE	W 8–1	36–15	1–0
June 11	Florida State	Johnny Rosenblatt Stadium • Omaha, NE	W 4–3^{11}	37–15	2–0
June 12	Missouri	Johnny Rosenblatt Stadium • Omaha, NE	W 6–4	38–15	3–0
June 13	Texas	Johnny Rosenblatt Stadium • Omaha, NE	W 10–8	39–15	4–0
June 14	Southern California	Johnny Rosenblatt Stadium • Omaha, NE	L 4–6	39–16	4–1
June 16	Southern California	Johnny Rosenblatt Stadium • Omaha, NE	L 2–5	39–17	4–2
