= 1963 Western Michigan Broncos baseball team =

American college baseball season

1963 Western Michigan Broncos baseball

Mid-American Conference champions District IV champions

College World Series, T-7th
- Conference: Mid-American Conference
- CB: No. 8
- Record: 24–6 (12–0 MAC)
- Head coach: Charlie Maher (25th season)
- Assistant coach: Bill Chambers (3rd season)
- Home stadium: Hyames Field

1963 Mid-American Conference baseball standings
	Conf.						Overall
Team	W		L		T	PCT	W		L		T	PCT
No. 8 Western Michigan ‍†‍‍^{y}	12	–	0	–	0	1.000	24	–	6	–	0	.800
Ohio ‍‍‍	9	–	3	–	0	.750	17	–	8	–	0	.680
Bowling Green ‍‍‍	7	–	5	–	0	.583	17	–	11	–	1	.603
Kent State ‍‍‍	5	–	6	–	0	.455	8	–	16	–	0	.333
Miami (OH) ‍‍‍	4	–	8	–	0	.333	10	–	13	–	0	.435
Toledo ‍‍‍	3	–	9	–	0	.250	10	–	14	–	0	.417
Marshall ‍‍‍	2	–	10	–	0	.167	8	–	17	–	0	.320
† – Conference champion y – Invited to the NCAA tournament As of June 30, 1963; Rankings from Collegiate Baseball

The 1963 Western Michigan Broncos baseball team represented Western Michigan University in the 1963 NCAA University Division baseball season. The Broncos played their home games at Hyames Field. The team was coached by Charlie Maher in his 25th year at Western Michigan.

The Broncos won the District IV playoff to advanced to the College World Series, where they were defeated by the Penn State Nittany Lions.

== Roster ==
1963 Western Michigan Broncos baseball team
Players
Coaches

#	Pos.	Name	B/T	Height	Weight	Year	Home town
		Dave Anderson	/	—	—
	C	Jerry Austry	/R	—	—	Sr	Chicago, Illinois
	RHP	Dave Bitante	/R	—	—	Jr	Cleveland, Ohio
	RHP	Mike Boedy	/R	—	—	Jr	Grand Rapids, Michigan
	LHP	Bruce Buys	/L	—	—	Jr	Coldwater, Michigan
	RHP	Curt Cleaver	/	—	—	Jr	Gary, Indiana
	OF	Fred Decker	/R	—	—
	OF	Al Drews	/	—	—	Jr
	OF	Mike Gatza	/	—	—
		Al Gibbs	/	—	—
		Bob Gilling	/	—	—
		Bill Guerrant	/	—	—
		Bill Kelly	/	—	—
		Bob Kowalski	/	—	—
	OF	Dave Kwiatkowski	/	6 ft 4 in (1.93 m)	210 lb (95 kg)	Jr
		Tom Martin	/	—	—
		Dan Mehling	/	—	—
	INF	Fred Michalski	/	—	—
	INF	Danny Predovic	R/	—	—
	INF	Dave Reeves	/	—	—		Kalamazoo, Michigan
	LHP	Lee Salo	/L	6 ft 5 in (1.96 m)	—	Sr	Livonia, Michigan
	INF	John Sluka	/	—	—	So	Grand Haven, Michigan
	C	Roger Theder	/	—	—		Watertown, Wisconsin
		Terry Voogd	/	—	—
		Bill Vroegop	/	—	—
	LHP	Gary Wallman	/L	—	—	Jr	South Bend, Indiana

Head coach

Charlie Maher

Assistant coach(es)

Bill Chambers

Legend

- (C) Team captain
- (S) Suspended
- (I) Ineligible
- Injured
- Current redshirt

== Schedule ==
1963 Western Michigan Broncos baseball game log
Regular season
April (11–1)

#	Date	Opponent	Site/stadium	Score	Overall record	MAC record
1	April 5	Kent State	Hyames Field • Kalamazoo, Michigan	22–1	1–0	1–0
2	April 6	Ken State	Hyames Field • Kalamazoo, Michigan	6–0	2–0	2–0
3	April 12	Ohio State	Hyames Field • Kalamazoo, Michigan	6–2	3–0	2–0
4	April 13	Ohio State	Hyames Field • Kalamazoo, Michigan	3–9	3–1	2–0
5	April 13	Ohio State	Hyames Field • Kalamazoo, Michigan	5–4	4–1	2–0
6	April 15	at Ball State	Unknown • Muncie, Indiana	13–6	5–1	2–0
7	April 16	at Ball State	Unknown • Muncie, Indiana	3–2	6–1	2–0
8	April 17	at Ball State	Unknown • Muncie, Indiana	17–3	7–1	2–0
9	April 19	Ohio	Hyames Field • Kalamazoo, Michigan	6–1	8–1	3–0
10	April 20	Ohio	Hyames Field • Kalamazoo, Michigan	10–5	9–1	4–0
11	April	at Marshall	Unknown • Huntington, West Virginia	16–1	10–1	5–0
12	April	at Marshall	Unknown • Huntington, West Virginia	11–0	11–1	6–0

May (10–2)

#	Date	Opponent	Site/stadium	Score	Overall record	MAC record
13	May 3	at Bowling Green	Unknown • Bowling Green, Ohio	13–6	12–1	7–0
14	May 4	at Bowling Green	Unknown • Bowling Green, Ohio	11–0	13–1	8–0
15	May 7	at Michigan State	Old College Field • East Lansing, Michigan	9–5	14–1	8–0
16	May	at Toledo	Unknown • Toledo, Ohio	12–4	15–1	9–0
17	May	at Toledo	Unknown • Toledo, Ohio	4–0	16–1	10–0
18	May 17	Miami (OH)	Hyames Field • Kalamazoo, Michigan	3–1	17–1	11–0
19	May 18	Miami (OH)	Hyames Field • Kalamazoo, Michigan	3–2	18–1	12–0
20	May	Michigan	Hyames Field • Kalamazoo, Michigan	0–3	18–2	12–0
21	May 21	Michigan State	Hyames Field • Kalamazoo, Michigan	13–3	19–2	12–0
22	May 22	at Michigan	Ray Fisher Stadium • Ann Arbor, Michigan	5–7	19–3	12–0
23	May 24	at Notre Dame	Cartier Field • Notre Dame, Indiana	5–2	20–3	12–0
24	May 25	Notre Dame	Hyames Field • Kalamazoo, Michigan	5–4	21–3	12–0

Postseason
District IV Playoff (3–1)

#	Date	Opponent	Site/stadium	Score	Overall record	MAC record
25	May 30	vs Notre Dame	Illinois Field • Champaign, Illinois	2–1	22–3	12–0
26	May 31	at Illinois	Illinois Field • Champaign, Illinois	1–0	23–3	12–0
27	June 1	at Illinois	Illinois Field • Champaign, Illinois	0–8	23–4	12–0
28	June 1	at Illinois	Illinois Field • Champaign, Illinois	7–0	24–4	12–0

College World Series (0–2)

#	Date	Opponent	Site/stadium	Score	Overall record	MAC record
29	June 10	vs Florida State	Omaha Municipal Stadium • Omaha, Nebraska	2–5	24–5	12–0
30	June 11	vs Penn State	Omaha Municipal Stadium • Omaha, Nebraska	0–3	24–6	12–0

== Awards and honors ==
Fred Decker

- First Team All-MAC

Al Drews

- Second Team All-MAC
- Second Team All-American

Dave Kwaitkowski

- First Team All-MAC

Fred Michalski

- Second Team All-American

Dan Predovic

- First Team All-MAC

Lee Salo

- First Team All-MAC

John Sluka

- Second Team All-MAC
