= 1963 USC Trojans baseball team =

American college baseball season

1963 USC Trojans baseball

College World Series champions CIBA Champions
- Conference: Athletic Association of Western Universities
- CB: No. 1
- Record: 35–10 (10–6 AAWU)
- Head coach: Rod Dedeaux (22nd year)
- Home stadium: Bovard Field

1963 Athletic Association of Western Universities baseball standings
	Conf.				Overall
Team	W		L	PCT	W		L	PCT
North Division
No. 10 Oregon State ‍†‍‍^{y}	11	–	4	.733	23	–	12	.657
No. 17 Oregon ‍‍‍	10	–	5	.667		–		–
Washington State ‍‍‍	7	–	7	.500	24	–	8	.750
Idaho ‍‍‍	5	–	9	.357		–		–
Washington ‍‍‍	3	–	11	.214	7	–	17	.292
California Intercollegiate Baseball Association
No. 1 Southern California ‍†‍‍^{y}	10	–	6	.625	35	–	10	.778
Santa Clara ‍‍‍	9	–	7	.563		–		–
No. 23 UCLA ‍‍‍	9	–	7	.563	30	–	17	.638
Stanford ‍‍‍	8	–	8	.500	24	–	11	.686
California ‍‍‍	4	–	12	.250	19	–	21	.475
† – Conference champion y – Invited to the NCAA tournament As of June 30, 1963; Rankings from Collegiate Baseball

The 1963 USC Trojans baseball team represented the University of Southern California in the 1963 NCAA University Division baseball season. The team was coached Rod Dedeaux in his 22nd season.

The Trojans won the College World Series, defeating the Arizona Wildcats in the championship game.

== Roster ==
1963 USC Trojans roster
Pitchers: Bart Araujo; Mike Crowley; Larry Fisher; Bob Fuller; Cliff Goodrich; Pete Hillman; Al Lasas; Walt Peterson; Ron Scott; James Ritter; Bob Selleck; Duane White; Steven Greenfield; Tom Seaver; Catchers: Steve Deleau; Bob Hollowell; Marty Piscovich	Infielders: Joe Austin; David Berg; Gary Coscarart; Justin Dedeaux; Ed Gagle; Nat Harty; Gary Holman; Marv Lotz; Larry Sandel; Bob Thompson; Ken Walker; Bob Withers; Daryl Wilkins	Outfielders: Jim Brown; Willie Brown; Fred Hill; Andy Pitchess; Mike Smith; Don Taylor; Toby Thurlow; Ken Washington; Coaches: Rod Dedeaux

== Schedule ==
1963 USC Trojans baseball game log
Regular season
March

Date	Opponent	Score	Overall record	AAWU record
	San Fernando Valley State	11–10	1–0	–
	Cal Poly Pomona	1–4	1–1	–
March 16	UCLA	3–13	1–2	0–1
March 16	UCLA	1–3	1–3	0–2
	Cal State Los Angeles	5–4	2–3	–
March 22	Fresno State	4–2	3–3	–
March 23	Fresno State	4–3	4–3	–
	San Diego	9–0	5–3	–
	Long Beach State	7–2	6–3	–
March 30	Stanford	2–1	7–3	1–2
March 30	Stanford	1–0	8–3	2–2

April

Date	Opponent	Score	Overall record	AAWU record
	at Long Beach State	8–1	9–3	–
	vs. San Jose State	2–0	10–3	–
	vs. BYU	17–1	11–3	–
	at Cal State Los Angeles	4–1	12–3	–
	vs. Cal Poly Pomona	6–0	13–3	–
	New Mexico	21–1	14–3	–
	vs. Cal Poly Pomona	10–2	15–3	–
April 20	vs. Cal Poly Pomona	7–5	16–3	–
	Occidental	1–4	16–4	–
	at San Fernando Valley State	20–13	17–4	–
	at Stanford	2–1	18–4	3–2
	at Stanford	3–6	18–5	3–3
	at Santa Clara	10–1	19–5	4–3
	at Santa Clara	1–6	19–6	4–4
	at California	3–2	20–6	5–4

May

Date	Opponent	Score	Overall record	AAWU record
	at California	4–3	21–6	6–4
	at UCLA	2–11	21–7	6–5
May 4	at UCLA	1–0	22–7	7–5
	Pepperdine	7–2	23–7	–
	Westmont	12–5	24–7	–
	California	6–4	25–7	8–5
	California	11–5	26–7	9–5
	Cal State Los Angeles	6–2	27–7	–
May 17	Santa Clara	3–0	28–7	10–5
May 18	Santa Clara	4–5	28–8	10–6

Postseason
NCAA tournament: District 8 playoffs

Date	Opponent	Score	Overall record
	vs. Oregon State	6–5	29–8
	vs. Oregon State	6–8	29–9
	vs. Oregon State	7–5	30–9

NCAA tournament: College World Series

Date	Opponent	Site/stadium	Score	Overall record
June 10	vs. Texas	Rosenblatt Stadium	3–8	30–10
June 11	vs. Holy Cross	Rosenblatt Stadium	6–5	31–10
June 12	vs. Florida State	Rosenblatt Stadium	4–3	32–10
June 13	vs. Missouri	Rosenblatt Stadium	12–3	33–10
June 14	Arizona	Rosenblatt Stadium	6–4	34–10
June 16	Arizona	Rosenblatt Stadium	5–2	35–10

== Awards and honors ==
Willie Brown

- All-AAWU First Team

Bud Hollowell

- College World Series Most Outstanding Player
- All-AAWU Honorable Mention

Gary Holman

- College World Series All-Tournament Team

Walt Peterson

- College World Series All-Tournament Team
- All-America Second Team
- All-AAWU First Team

Marty Piscovich

- All-AAWU Honorable Mention

Ken Walker

- All-AAWU Honorable Mention

Kenny Washington

- College World Series All-Tournament Team
