= 1963 Missouri Tigers baseball team =

American college baseball season

1963 Missouri Tigers baseball

Big Eight champions District V champions

College World Series, T-3rd
- Conference: Big Eight Conference
- CB: No. 3
- Record: 25–8 (15–3 Big 8)
- Head coach: Hi Simmons (23rd season)
- Captain: Gene McArtor
- Home stadium: Simmons Field

1963 Big Eight Conference baseball standings
	Conf.				Overall
Team	W		L	PCT	W		L	PCT
No. 3 Missouri ‍†‍‍^{y}	17	–	3	.850	25	–	8	.758
Oklahoma ‍‍‍	13	–	5	.722	14	–	10	.583
Colorado ‍‍‍	11	–	7	.611	12	–	12	.500
Kansas ‍‍‍	11	–	8	.579	15	–	10	.600
Oklahoma State ‍‍‍	12	–	9	.571	15	–	10	.600
Nebraska ‍‍‍	5	–	10	.333	10	–	16	.385
Iowa State ‍‍‍	4	–	14	.222	7	–	14	.333
Kansas State ‍‍‍	4	–	16	.200	6	–	20	.231
† – Conference champion y – Invited to the NCAA tournament As of June 30, 1963; Rankings from Collegiate Baseball

The 1963 Missouri Tigers baseball team represented University of Missouri in the 1963 NCAA University Division baseball season. The Tigers played their home games at Simmons Field. The team was coached by Hi Simmons in his 23rd year as head coach at Missouri.

The Tigers won the District V Playoff to advance to the College World Series, where they were defeated by the Southern California Trojans.

== Roster ==
1963 Missouri Tigers baseball team
Players
Coaches

#	Pos.	Name	B/T	Height	Weight	Year	Home town
	P	Larry Bohannon	/	—	—	Sr
		Jim Card	/	—	—	Sr
		Jim Estes (injured)	/	—	—
	INF	Dave Harvey	/	—	—	Jr
		Tim Heintzelman	/	—	—
	INF	Gene McArtor (C)	/	—	—	Sr
		Carroll McDannold	/	—	—
	RHP	Dennis Musgraves	R/R	6 ft 4 in (1.93 m)	188 lb (85 kg)	So	Indianapolis, Indiana
		Rich Peterson	/	—	—	Sr
	INF	Rob Price	/	—	—	Jr
		Jim Sevcik	/	—	—	Jr
	C	John Sevcik	R/R	6 ft 2 in (1.88 m)	205 lb (93 kg)	Jr	Berwyn, Illinois
		John Simmons	/	—	—	So
	LHP	Jack Stroud	S/L	6 ft 0 in (1.83 m)	185 lb (84 kg)	So
	RHP	Keith Weber	R/R	6 ft 2 in (1.88 m)	185 lb (84 kg)	Jr	Jefferson City, Missouri
		Gary Woods	/	—	—

Head coach

Hi Simmons

Assistant coach(es)

Legend

- (C) Team captain
- (S) Suspended
- (I) Ineligible
- Injured
- Current redshirt

[2 Roster]
Last update: January 11, 2022

== Schedule ==
1963 Missouri Tigers baseball game log
Regular season
March (1–1)

#	Date	Opponent	Site/stadium	Score	Overall record	Big 8 record
1	March 30	at Arkansas	Washington County Fairgrounds • Fayetteville, Arkansas	16–6	1–0	0–0
2	March 30	at Arkansas	Washington County Fairgrounds • Fayetteville, Arkansas	5–6	1–1	0–0

April (12–2)

#	Date	Opponent	Site/stadium	Score	Overall record	Big 8 record
3	April 1	at Centenary	Unknown • Shreveport, Louisiana	7–2	2–1	0–0
4	April 2	at Centenary	Unknown • Shreveport, Louisiana	11–6	3–1	0–0
5	April 3	at Tulsa	Unknown • Tulsa, Oklahoma	4–5	3–2	0–0
6	April 3	at Tulsa	Unknown • Tulsa, Oklahoma	4–1	4–2	0–0
7	April 5	at Oklahoma State	Unknown • Stillwater, Oklahoma	0–1	4–3	0–1
8	April 5	at Oklahoma State	Unknown • Stillwater, Oklahoma	2–0	5–3	1–1
9	April 12	at Iowa State	Cap Timm Field • Ames, Iowa	2–0	6–3	2–1
10	April 12	at Iowa State	Cap Timm Field • Ames, Iowa	9–1	7–3	3–1
11	April 13	at Iowa State	Cap Timm Field • Ames, Iowa	3–0	8–3	4–1
12	April 19	Colorado	Simmons Field • Columbia, Missouri	21–7	9–3	5–1
13	April 20	Colorado	Simmons Field • Columbia, Missouri	7–1	10–3	6–1
14	April 20	Colorado	Simmons Field • Columbia, Missouri	9–0	11–3	7–1
15	April 26	Kansas State	Simmons Field • Columbia, Missouri	4–1	12–3	8–1
16	April 26	Kansas State	Simmons Field • Columbia, Missouri	8–1	13–3	9–1

May (7–2)

#	Date	Opponent	Site/stadium	Score	Overall record	Big 8 record
17	May 3	Oklahoma	Simmons Field • Columbia, Missouri	2–3	13–4	9–2
18	May 3	Oklahoma	Simmons Field • Columbia, Missouri	9–6	14–4	10–2
19	May 4	Oklahoma	Simmons Field • Columbia, Missouri	5–1	15–4	11–2
20	May 10	at Nebraska	Husker Diamond • Lincoln, Nebraska	6–0	16–4	11–2
21	May 10	at Nebraska	Husker Diamond • Lincoln, Nebraska	8–0	17–4	12–2
22	May 11	at Nebraska	Husker Diamond • Lincoln, Nebraska	7–0	18–4	13–2
23	May 17	Kansas	Simmons Field • Columbia, Missouri	2–1	19–4	14–2
24	May 18	Kansas	Simmons Field • Columbia, Missouri	2–3	19–5	14–3
25	May 18	Kansas	Simmons Field • Columbia, Missouri	4–3	20–5	15–3

Postseason
NCAA District V Playoff (2–1)

#	Date	Opponent	Site/stadium	Score	Overall record	Big 8 record
26	June 3	at Saint Louis	Musial Field • St. Louis, Missouri	16–0	21–5	15–3
27	June 4	at Saint Louis	Musial Field • St. Louis, Missouri	1–2	21–6	15–3
28	June 4	at Saint Louis	Musial Field • St. Louis, Missouri	7–1	22–6	15–3

College World Series (2–2)

#	Date	Opponent	Site/stadium	Score	Overall record	Big 8 record
29	June 10	vs Holy Cross	Omaha Municipal Stadium • Omaha, Nebraska	3–0	23–6	15–3
30	June 11	vs Texas	Omaha Municipal Stadium • Omaha, Nebraska	3–2	24–6	15–3
31	June 12	vs Arizona	Omaha Municipal Stadium • Omaha, Nebraska	4–6	24–7	15–3
32	June 13	vs Southern California	Omaha Municipal Stadium • Omaha, Nebraska	3–12	24–8	15–3

== Awards and honors ==
Dave Harvey

- Second Team All-American
- All-Big Eight Conference
- All District V Team

Gene McArtor

- All-Big Eight Conference
- All District V Team

Bob Price

- All-Big Eight Conference
- All District V Team

John Sevcik

- Third Team All-American
- All-Big Eight Conference
- All District V Team

Jack Stroud

- All-Big Eight Conference
- All District V Team
