= 1963 NCAA University Division baseball season =

Baseball season

NCAA tournament

College World Series
- Champions: USC (4th title)
- Runners-up: Arizona (7th CWS Appearance)
- Winning coach: Rod Dedeaux (4th title)
- MOP: Bud Hollowell (USC)

Seasons
- ← 1962 1964 →

The 1963 NCAA University Division baseball season, play of college baseball in the United States organized by the National Collegiate Athletic Association (NCAA) began in the spring of 1963. The season progressed through the regular season and concluded with the 1963 College World Series. The College World Series, held for the seventeenth time in 1963, consisted of one team from each of eight geographical districts and was held in Omaha, Nebraska at Johnny Rosenblatt Stadium as a double-elimination tournament. Southern California claimed the championship.

== Realignment ==
The NCAA realigned the Western Athletic Conference from District 6 to District 7.

== Conference winners ==
This is a partial list of conference champions from the 1963 season. Each of the eight geographical districts chose, by various methods, the team that would represent them in the NCAA tournament. 8 teams earned automatic bids by winning their conference championship while 15 teams earned at-large selections.

Conference	Regular season winner	Conference Tournament	Tournament Venue • City	Tournament Winner
Atlantic Coast Conference	Wake Forest	no tournament		
Big Eight Conference	Missouri	no tournament		
Big Ten Conference	Illinois	no tournament		
CIBA	Southern California	no tournament		
EIBL	Columbia/Dartmouth/Navy	no tournament		
Mid-American Conference	Western Michigan	no tournament		
Pacific Coast Conference	Oregon State	no tournament		
Southeastern Conference	Auburn	no tournament		
Southern Conference	West Virginia	no tournament		
Southwest Conference	Texas/TCU	no tournament		
Western Athletic Conference	Northern - BYU; Southern - Arizona	1963 Western Athletic Conference Baseball Championship Series	Tucson, Arizona	Arizona
Yankee Conference	Connecticut	no tournament		

== Conference standings ==
The following is an incomplete list of conference standings:

1963 Athletic Association of Western Universities baseball standings
	Conf.				Overall
Team	W		L	PCT	W		L	PCT
North Division
No. 10 Oregon State ‍†‍‍^{y}	11	–	4	.733	23	–	12	.657
No. 17 Oregon ‍‍‍	10	–	5	.667		–		–
Washington State ‍‍‍	7	–	7	.500	24	–	8	.750
Idaho ‍‍‍	5	–	9	.357		–		–
Washington ‍‍‍	3	–	11	.214	7	–	17	.292
California Intercollegiate Baseball Association
No. 1 Southern California ‍†‍‍^{y}	10	–	6	.625	35	–	10	.778
Santa Clara ‍‍‍	9	–	7	.563		–		–
No. 23 UCLA ‍‍‍	9	–	7	.563	30	–	17	.638
Stanford ‍‍‍	8	–	8	.500	24	–	11	.686
California ‍‍‍	4	–	12	.250	19	–	21	.475
† – Conference champion y – Invited to the NCAA tournament As of June 30, 1963; Rankings from Collegiate Baseball

1963 Big Eight Conference baseball standings
	Conf.				Overall
Team	W		L	PCT	W		L	PCT
No. 3 Missouri ‍†‍‍^{y}	17	–	3	.850	25	–	8	.758
Oklahoma ‍‍‍	13	–	5	.722	14	–	10	.583
Colorado ‍‍‍	11	–	7	.611	12	–	12	.500
Kansas ‍‍‍	11	–	8	.579	15	–	10	.600
Oklahoma State ‍‍‍	12	–	9	.571	15	–	10	.600
Nebraska ‍‍‍	5	–	10	.333	10	–	16	.385
Iowa State ‍‍‍	4	–	14	.222	7	–	14	.333
Kansas State ‍‍‍	4	–	16	.200	6	–	20	.231
† – Conference champion y – Invited to the NCAA tournament As of June 30, 1963; Rankings from Collegiate Baseball

1963 Mid-American Conference baseball standings
	Conf.						Overall
Team	W		L		T	PCT	W		L		T	PCT
No. 8 Western Michigan ‍†‍‍^{y}	12	–	0	–	0	1.000	24	–	6	–	0	.800
Ohio ‍‍‍	9	–	3	–	0	.750	17	–	8	–	0	.680
Bowling Green ‍‍‍	7	–	5	–	0	.583	17	–	11	–	1	.603
Kent State ‍‍‍	5	–	6	–	0	.455	8	–	16	–	0	.333
Miami (OH) ‍‍‍	4	–	8	–	0	.333	10	–	13	–	0	.435
Toledo ‍‍‍	3	–	9	–	0	.250	10	–	14	–	0	.417
Marshall ‍‍‍	2	–	10	–	0	.167	8	–	17	–	0	.320
† – Conference champion y – Invited to the NCAA tournament As of June 30, 1963; Rankings from Collegiate Baseball

1963 NCAA University Division District 3 baseball independents standings
	Conf.				Overall
Team	W		L	PCT	W		L	PCT
Campbell ‍‍‍		–		–	11	–	5	.688
No. 6 Florida State ‍‍‍^{y}		–		–	26	–	13	.667
Elon ‍‍‍		–		–	19	–	15	.559
Georgetown ‍‍‍		–		–	8	–	9	.471
Mercer ‍‍‍		–		–	8	–	13	.381
Jacksonville ‍‍‍		–		–	10	–	18	.357
Stetson ‍‍‍		–		–	5	–	20	.200
y – Invited to the NCAA tournament As of June 30, 1963; Rankings from Collegiate Baseball

1963 Southern Conference baseball standings
	Conf.				Overall
Team	W		L	PCT	W		L	PCT
No. 11 West Virginia ‍†‍‍^{y}	13	–	1	.929	30	–	3	.909
Virginia Tech ‍‍‍	10	–	1	.909	14	–	7	.667
Richmond ‍‍‍	9	–	5	.643	10	–	8	.556
VMI ‍‍‍	7	–	7	.500	14	–	11	.560
The Citadel ‍‍‍	4	–	7	.364	9	–	10	.474
George Washington ‍‍‍	4	–	8	.333	4	–	13	.235
Furman ‍‍‍	3	–	7	.300	7	–	16	.304
Davidson ‍‍‍	4	–	10	.286	8	–	18	.308
William & Mary ‍‍‍	1	–	9	.100	2	–	14	.125
† – Conference champion y – Invited to the NCAA Tournament; As of June 30, 1963; Rankings from Collegiate Baseball

1963 Southwest Conference baseball standings
	Conf.						Overall
Team	W		L		T	PCT	W		L		T	PCT
No. 4 Texas ‍†‍‍^{y}	12	–	3	–	0	.800	24	–	7	–	1	.766
No. 26 TCU ‍†‍‍	12	–	3	–	0	.800	21	–	4	–	0	.840
Texas A&M ‍‍‍	9	–	6	–	0	.600	15	–	10	–	0	.600
Baylor ‍‍‍	7	–	8	–	0	.467	13	–	11	–	0	.542
Rice ‍‍‍	2	–	11	–	0	.154	9	–	17	–	0	.346
SMU ‍‍‍	1	–	12	–	0	.077	5	–	17	–	0	.227
† – Conference champion y – Invited to the NCAA tournament As of June 30, 1963; Rankings from Collegiate Baseball

1963 Western Athletic Conference baseball standings
	Conf.				Overall
Team	W		L	PCT	W		L	PCT
Northern
BYU ^{x}‍‍‍	7	–	1	.875	22	–	12	.647
Utah ‍‍‍	4	–	4	.500	15	–	14	.517
Wyoming ‍‍‍	1	–	7	.125	9	–	21	.300
Southern
No. 2 Arizona ^{x}‍‍‡‍^{y}	8	–	4	.667	39	–	17	.696
No. 20 Arizona State ‍‍‍	7	–	5	.583	34	–	13	.723
New Mexico ‍‍‍	3	–	9	.250	18	–	16	.529
x – Division champion ‡ – Playoff champion y – Invited to the NCAA tournament As of June 30, 1963; Rankings from Collegiate Baseball

== College World Series ==
The 1963 season marked the sixteenth NCAA baseball tournament, which culminated with the eight team College World Series. The College World Series was held in Omaha, Nebraska. The eight teams played a double-elimination format, with Southern California claiming their fourth championship with a 5–2 win over Arizona in the final.

Upper round 1
Arizona	8
Penn State	1
Florida State	5
Western Michigan	2
Texas	8
Southern California	3
Missouri	3
Holy Cross	0

Upper round 2
Arizona	4^{11}
Florida State	3
Missouri	3
Texas	2
Lower round 1
Penn State	3
Western Michigan	0
Southern California	6
Holy Cross	5

Upper final
Arizona	6
Missouri	4
Lower round 2
Texas	6^{10}
Penn State	4
Florida State	3
Southern California	4

Semifinals
Arizona	10
Texas	8
Missouri	3
Southern California	12

Final
Arizona	4	2
Southern California	6	5
