= Brian Edgerly =

American baseball player (1943–2026)

- Outfielder
- Born: July 18, 1943; Plymouth, New Hampshire, U.S.
- Died: April 22, 2026 (aged 82)
- Batted: Right Threw: Left

Brian Clark Edgerly (July 18, 1943 – April 22, 2026) was an American baseball outfielder who played internationally with Team USA at the 1964 Summer Olympics.

== Biography ==
Edgerly was born in Plymouth, New Hampshire, on July 18, 1943. He played college baseball at Colgate University, where he majored in philosophy and religion, and captained the soccer, ice hockey, and baseball teams. He was a third-team baseball All-American in 1964, leading the nation in batting average with a .449 mark. In 1964 Edgerly played collegiate summer baseball with the Orleans Cardinals of the Cape Cod Baseball League and was named a league all-star. He went on to play for Team USA at the 1964 Summer Olympics. He was selected by the Boston Red Sox in the 17th round of the 1965 MLB draft, and played in the Red Sox' minor league system for the Waterloo Hawks in 1965 and 1966. Edgerly was inducted into the Colgate Raiders' Hall of Honor in 1982.

Edgerly died on April 22, 2026, at the age of 82.
