= Dick Joyce (baseball) =

American baseball player (1943-2007)

- Pitcher
- Born: November 18, 1943; Portland, Maine, U.S.
- Died: January 23, 2007 (aged 63); Raleigh, North Carolina, U.S.
- Batted: Left Threw: Left

MLB debut
- September 3, 1965, for the Kansas City Athletics

Last MLB appearance
- October 2, 1965, for the Kansas City Athletics

MLB statistics
- Win–loss record: 0–1
- Earned run average: 2.77
- Strikeouts: 7
- Stats at Baseball Reference

Teams
- Kansas City Athletics (1965)

Richard Edward Joyce (November 18, 1943 – January 23, 2007) was an American pitcher who played in Major League Baseball during the 1965 season. Listed at 6 ft 5 in (1.96 m), 225 pounds (102 kg), Joyce batted and threw left-handed. He was signed by the Kansas City Athletics out of the College of the Holy Cross.

== Biography ==
A native of Portland, Maine, Joyce was a basketball and baseball star at Cheverus High School. In 1961, after his graduation, the Boston Red Sox offered him a $100,000 signing bonus – an astounding figure at the time – but he rejected it to attend College of the Holy Cross in Worcester, Massachusetts. He appeared in the College World Series of 1962 and 1963, alongside future entrepreneur John Peterman. Joyce represented the United States in baseball at the 1964 Summer Olympics as a demonstration sport, one of seven pitchers on the team.

In December 1964, Joyce signed with the Athletics for a reported $40,000. He started his professional career in 1965 with the Double-A Birmingham Barons and joined the big team late in the season. He posted a 0–1 record with a 2.77 ERA in five games, including three starts, seven strikeouts and four walks in 13.0 innings pitched.

After that, Joyce developed arm troubles and never pitched again. Following his playing retirement, he developed a long career as an IBM executive.

Joyce died in Raleigh, North Carolina, at the age 63, shortly after undergoing a pair of heart surgeries.

== Sources ==
- Maine Today Obituary
