= Chuck Dobson =

American baseball player (1944–2021)

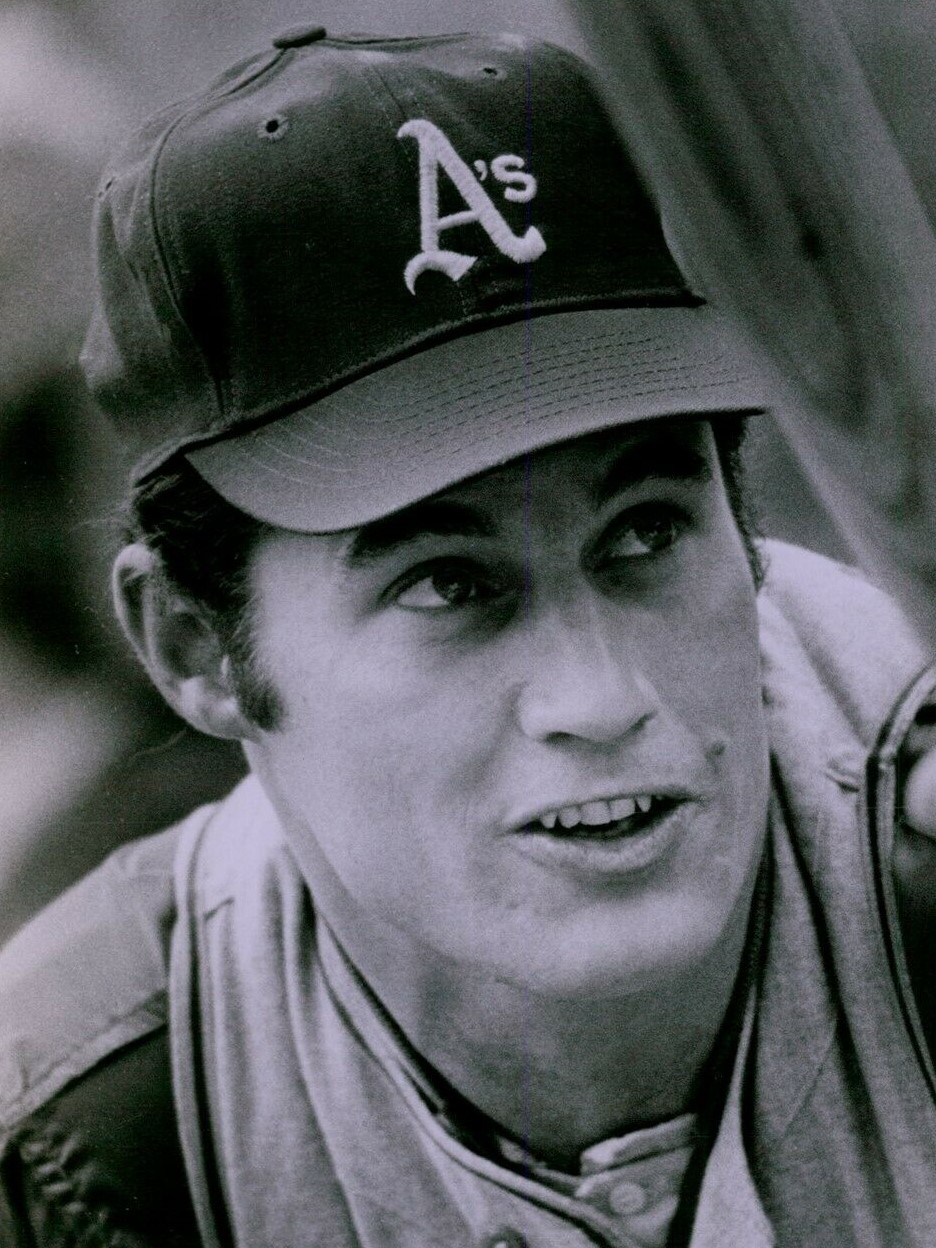
- Pitcher
- Born: January 10, 1944; Kansas City, Missouri, U.S.
- Died: November 30, 2021 (aged 77); Kansas City, Missouri, U.S.
- Batted: Right Threw: Right

MLB debut
- April 19, 1966, for the Kansas City Athletics

Last MLB appearance
- May 26, 1975, for the California Angels

MLB statistics
- Win–loss record: 74–69
- Earned run average: 3.78
- Strikeouts: 758
- Stats at Baseball Reference

Teams
- Kansas City / Oakland Athletics (1966–1971, 1973); California Angels (1974–1975)

Charles Thomas Dobson (January 10, 1944 – November 30, 2021) was an American professional baseball player who played nine seasons for the Kansas City / Oakland Athletics and the California Angels of Major League Baseball. He played college baseball for the Kansas Jayhawks and competed in the 1964 Summer Olympics.

== Life and career ==
Dobson played college baseball for the University of Kansas. He represented the United States in baseball at the 1964 Summer Olympics as a demonstration sport, one of seven pitchers on the team.

He made his major league debut for the Kansas City Athletics on April 19, 1966. This marked the first time that a starting pitcher made his big league debut in his team's home opener in the state in which he was born. This feat was repeated 51 years later by Kyle Freeland of the Colorado Rockies. In 1970, Dobson earned a career-high 16 wins and threw five shutouts, tying with Jim Palmer and Gaylord Perry for the major league lead. After a 15–5 record in 1971, Dobson experienced significant pain in his pitching elbow due to growing calcium deposits. Surgery that off-season kept him out of the majors throughout 1972. Although he returned to the majors for brief stints in 1973 and 1974, his career was effectively ended by the elbow injury.

Dobson died on November 30, 2021, at the age of 77.
