= 1963 NAIA World Series =

1963 NAIA baseball tournament
- 1963 NAIA World Series
- Teams: 8
- Format: Double elimination
- Finals site: Phil Welch Stadium; St. Joseph, Missouri
- Champions: Sam Houston State (1st title)
- Winning coach: Ray Benge
- MVP: Jimmy Dodd (SS) (Sam Houston State)

The 1963 NAIA World Series was the seventh annual tournament hosted by the National Association of Intercollegiate Athletics to determine the national champion of baseball among its member colleges and universities in the United States and Canada.

The tournament was played at Phil Welch Stadium in St. Joseph, Missouri.

Sam Houston State (27-8) defeated Grambling (28-4) in the championship series, 2–1, to win the Bearkats' first NAIA World Series.

Sam Houston State shortstop Jimmy Dodd was named tournament MVP.

== Bracket ==
First round	Second round	Semifinals	National Championship
California Western	0
Lewis (IL)	1
Lewis	1
Grambling	6
East Carolina	4
Grambling	5
Grambling	3
Sam Houston State	6
California State	1
Sam Houston State	21
Sam Houston State	5
Mayville State	0
Mayville State	13
Winona State	11	Sam Houston State	2
Grambling	1
Consolation first round	Consolation second round	Consolation third round	Consolation fourth round
Mayville State	1
California Western	0	East Carolina	3	Grambling	7
East Carolina	5	East Carolina	10	East Carolina	2
Winona State	2
Lewis	3
California State	1	Winona State	12
Winona State	4

== See also ==
- 1963 NCAA University Division baseball tournament
