= Jim Hibbs =

American baseball player (born 1944)

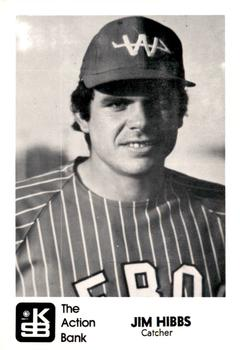
- Pinch hitter
- Born: September 10, 1944 (age 81); Klamath Falls, Oregon, U.S.
- Batted: Right Threw: Right

MLB debut
- April 12, 1967, for the California Angels

Last MLB appearance
- May 13, 1967, for the California Angels

MLB statistics
- Hits: 0
- At bats: 3
- Strikeouts: 2
- Stats at Baseball Reference

Teams
- California Angels (1967)

James Kerr Hibbs (born September 10, 1944) is an American former professional baseball player whose eight-year career was punctuated by a brief, three-game trial with the 1967 California Angels of Major League Baseball. Hibbs was a catcher and outfielder by trade, but his MLB experience was limited to three pinch hitting appearances at the outset of the 1967 season. He threw and batted right-handed, stood 6 feet (1.8 m) tall and weighed 190 pounds (86 kg) during his active career.

== Biography ==
Born in Klamath Falls, Oregon, Hibbs graduated from high school in Ventura, California, and played college baseball at Stanford University, where he was an All-American selection. He represented the United States in baseball at the 1964 Summer Olympics as a demonstration sport in Tokyo. During a series of games in Japan, he batted .379 with four home runs.

Hibbs was chosen in the third round of the secondary phase of the January 1966 Major League Baseball draft by the Los Angeles Dodgers. After hitting .309 with nine home runs during a year spent at the Rookie and Class A levels of the Dodgers' farm system, he entered the Rule 5 draft that fall, and the Angels acquired him. He remained on the Halos' 28-man, early-season roster when the 1967 American League season began and made his debut April 12 against Mickey Lolich of the Detroit Tigers, making a ground ball out to the second baseman in the ninth inning, pinch-hitting for veteran relief pitcher Jim Coates to make the final out in the Tigers' 6–3 win at Anaheim Stadium. In his other two plate appearances, Hibbs struck out against Darold Knowles of the Washington Senators on May 6, and fanned against Jim O'Toole of the Chicago White Sox on May 13. The three pitchers whom Hibbs faced were all left-handers.

Hibbs was sent to the minor leagues when rosters were cut to 25 men later in May and played the remainder of his pro career in the Angels', Cincinnati Reds' and Chicago Cubs' organizations, through 1973. He batted .271 with 43 home runs in 553 games played. A member of the Stanford Athletic Hall of Fame and the Ventura County Sports Hall of Fame, Hibbs has authored two books on baseball technique, A Catcher's Life and Instant Baseball.
