= UA Field =

College baseball stadium in Tucson, Arizona

- "University Field" "University Diamond"
- Interactive map of UA Field
- Location: University of Arizona; Tucson, Arizona, U.S.
- Coordinates: 32°13′52″N 110°56′56″W
- Owner: University of Arizona
- Operator: University of Arizona
- Capacity: 1,400
- Surface: Natural grass

Construction
- Opened: November 1929
- Closed: 1966
- Demolished: 1966
- Cost: $13,000
- Architect: Roy Place
- General contractor: Orndorff Construction

Tenant
- Arizona Wildcats (NCAA) (1929–1966)

UA Field was a college baseball park in the southwestern United States, located on the campus of the University of Arizona in Tucson, Arizona. It served as the home field of the Arizona Wildcats baseball team from 1929 to 1966.

== History ==
=== Construction ===
Designed by noted Tucson architect Roy Place (who also designed the adjacent Arizona Stadium and Bear Down Gym), UA Field was constructed in 1929 by Orndorff Construction for $13,000. The playing surface was oriented facing southeast, bounded on the north by University Boulevard, on the east by Cherry Avenue, on the south by 4th Street and the west by Bear Down Gym. The new stadium was frequently referred to as "University Field" or "University Diamond."

=== Facilities ===
UA Field did not have locker rooms, thus players had to dress and shower in the facilities at the adjacent Bear Down Gym. The stadium also lacked lights and could not host night games; afternoon games that ran long frequently needed to be called due to the darkness. This would eventually lead to the Wildcats hosting many games - particularly night games - at the off-campus Hi Corbett Field (known before 1951 as Randolph Municipal Baseball Park), beginning with a 1940 Border Conference championship game against New Mexico. In later years, it became frequent that double-headers would be scheduled with the first game being held in the afternoon at UA Field, and the second being held at night at Hi Corbett Field.

=== Laboratory of Tree-Ring Research ===
In addition to hosting the Wildcats baseball team, the first floor of the stadium hosted the university's Laboratory of Tree-Ring Research upon its founding in 1937. By the early 1940s it had moved to a space underneath Arizona Stadium where it remained for over 70 years.

=== Decline and replacement ===
As the Wildcats began to rise to prominence in the 1950s under Hall of Fame coach Frank Sancet, it also began to become apparent that the team was outgrowing its small campus ballpark. The facilities at UA Field were not substantial enough to host postseason play, and as such when Arizona was selected to host the District VI Regional in 1951, they had to do so at Hi Corbett Field. They continued to do such throughout the remainder of UA Field's existence, subsequently hosting postseason play at Hi Corbett in 1953, 1956, 1958, 1960, 1962, 1963 and 1966.

Attendance problems also plagued the team's time at UA Field as games played there had to be held during the day when many were at work and the desert summer heat was strongest. Following the success of a mid-season night game at Hi Corbett against San Diego State in 1956 that drew an attendance of 1,200, sports writer Bud Tucker of the Tucson Daily Citizen proclaimed that "Tucson will support college baseball - if the games are staged at working men's hours."

UA Field had originally been located on the edge of the university campus, however by the 1960s new campus construction was rapidly beginning to encroach upon the area of the stadium. The university sought to redevelop the space occupied by the outdated ballpark into new educational facilities. While postseason games and rivalry games against Arizona State held at Hi Corbett were a great attendance success, the Wildcats chose not to move to the stadium full-time and instead opted to build a new ballpark a few blocks to the southeast. Following the 1966 season that saw the Wildcats advance to their eighth College World Series, UA Field was closed and demolished; the following year Arizona began play at their new ballpark Wildcat Field (later renamed Frank Sancet Stadium), which would remain their home until 2011. The final game at UA Field was an 18–2 victory over then-WAC foe New Mexico on May 7, 1966.

Ultimately the lot that UA Field had been on was developed into the new Main Library building, which would open in 1977 and continues to stand today.
