= 1963 Texas Longhorns baseball team =

American college baseball season

1963 Texas Longhorns baseball

SWC champions

College World Series, 2–2
- Conference: Southwest Conference
- Record: 24–7–1 (12–3 SWC)
- Head coach: Bibb Falk (21st year)
- Home stadium: Clark Field

1963 Southwest Conference baseball standings
| | Conf. | | | | | | Overall |
| Team | W | | L | | T | PCT | W | | L | | T | PCT |
|---|---|---|---|---|---|---|---|---|---|---|---|---|
| No. 4 Texas ‍†‍‍^{y} | 12 | – | 3 | – | 0 | .800 | 24 | – | 7 | – | 1 | .766 |
| No. 26 TCU ‍†‍‍ | 12 | – | 3 | – | 0 | .800 | 21 | – | 4 | – | 0 | .840 |
| Texas A&M ‍‍‍ | 9 | – | 6 | – | 0 | .600 | 15 | – | 10 | – | 0 | .600 |
| Baylor ‍‍‍ | 7 | – | 8 | – | 0 | .467 | 13 | – | 11 | – | 0 | .542 |
| Rice ‍‍‍ | 2 | – | 11 | – | 0 | .154 | 9 | – | 17 | – | 0 | .346 |
| SMU ‍‍‍ | 1 | – | 12 | – | 0 | .077 | 5 | – | 17 | – | 0 | .227 |
† – Conference champion y – Invited to the NCAA tournament As of June 30, 1963; Rankings from Collegiate Baseball

The 1963 Texas Longhorns baseball team represented the University of Texas at Austin in the 1963 NCAA University Division baseball season. The Longhorns played their home games at Clark Field. The team was coached by Bibb Falk in his 21st season at Texas.

The Longhorns reached the College World Series, finishing tied for third with losses to eventual runner-up Arizona and third-place Missouri.

== Personnel ==
=== Roster ===
1963 Texas Longhorns roster
| Pitchers: David Burleson; Robert Willis Myer Jr.; Catchers Manager: Dan N. Gardner | Infielders: Bill Bethea; James Weldon Clark; Butch Thompson; Outfielders: Chuck Knutson | Unknown: Francis Folsom Bell; John Calvin Collier; Charles O. Hartenstein; Edward E. Kasper; Gary E. London; Robert Eugene Ross |

== Schedule and results ==
Legend
| Texas win |
| Texas loss |
| Tie |

1963 Texas Longhorns baseball game log
Regular season

March
| Date | Opponent | Site/stadium | Score | Overall record | SWC record |
|---|---|---|---|---|---|
| Mar 4 | Sam Houston State Teachers College* | Clark Field • Austin, TX | L 2–5^{10} | 0–1 | |
| Mar 8 | Oklahoma* | Clark Field • Austin, TX | W 4–0 | 1–1 | |
| Mar 9 | Oklahoma* | Clark Field • Austin, TX | W 6–2 | 2–1 | |
| Mar 12 | Texas Lutheran* | Clark Field • Austin, TX | W 12–5 | 3–1 | |
| Mar 16 | Texas A&M* | Clark Field • Austin, TX | T 6–6 | 3–1–1 | 0–0 |
| Mar 19 | SMU | Clark Field • Austin, TX | W 7–3 | 4–1–1 | 1–0 |
| Mar 23 | at TCU | TCU Diamond • Fort Worth, TX | L 1–3 | 4–2–1 | 1–1 |
| Mar 25 | Minnesota* | Clark Field • Austin, TX | L 6–15 | 4–3–1 | |
| Mar 26 | Minnesota* | Clark Field • Austin, TX | W 6–5 | 5–3–1 | |
| Mar 30 | Baylor | Clark Field • Austin, TX | L 2–3 | 5–4–1 | 1–2 |

April
| Date | Opponent | Site/stadium | Score | Overall record | SWC record |
|---|---|---|---|---|---|
| Apr 2 | at Rice | Houston, TX | W 3–2 | 6–4–1 | 2–2 |
| Apr 9 | Illinois* | Clark Field • Austin, TX | W 6–1 | 7–4–1 | |
| Apr 11 | North Dakota* | Clark Field • Austin, TX | W 15–11 | 8–4–1 | |
| Apr 16 | St. Mary's (TX)* | Clark Field • Austin, TX | W 6–3 | 9–4–1 | |
| Apr 19 | TCU | Clark Field • Austin, TX | W 5–4 | 10–4–1 | 3–2 |
| Apr 20 | TCU | Clark Field • Austin, TX | W 9–5 | 11–4–1 | 4–2 |
| Apr 26 | at SMU | Dallas, TX | W 8–1 | 12–4–1 | 5–2 |
| Apr 30 | at SMU | Dallas, TX | W 8–5 | 13–4–1 | 6–2 |

May
| Date | Opponent | Site/stadium | Score | Overall record | SWC record |
|---|---|---|---|---|---|
| May 2 | Rice | Clark Field • Austin, TX | W 5–4 | 14–4–1 | 7–2 |
| May 3 | Rice | Clark Field • Austin, TX | W 9–5 | 15–4–1 | 8–2 |
| May 7 | Texas A&M | Clark Field • Austin, TX | W 12–2 | 16–4–1 | 9–2 |
| May 10 | at Texas A&M | Kyle Baseball Field • College Station, TX | L 5–10 | 16–5–1 | 9–3 |
| May 11 | at Texas A&M | Kyle Baseball Field • College Station, TX | W 4–2 | 17–5–1 | 10–3 |
| May 13 | at Baylor | Waco, TX | W 5–1 | 18–5–1 | 11–3 |
| May 13 | at Baylor | Waco, TX | W 8–2 | 19–5–1 | 12–4 |

Postseason

Exhibitions
| Date | Opponent | Site/stadium | Score | Overall record |
|---|---|---|---|---|
| May 31 | SMI Steelers | Clark Field • Austin, TX | W 12–1 | 20–5–1 |
| June 2 | LaGrange Demons | Clark Field • Austin, TX | W 13–1 | 21–5–1 |
| June 7 | at SMI Steelers | Seguin, TX | W 10–9^{10} | 22–5–1 |

College World Series
| Date | Opponent | Site/stadium | Score | Overall record | CWS record |
|---|---|---|---|---|---|
| June 10 | Southern California | Johnny Rosenblatt Stadium • Omaha, NE | W 8–3 | 23–5–1 | 1–0 |
| June 11 | Missouri | Johnny Rosenblatt Stadium • Omaha, NE | L 2–3 | 23–6–1 | 1–1 |
| June 12 | Penn State | Johnny Rosenblatt Stadium • Omaha, NE | W 6–4^{10} | 24–6–1 | 2–1 |
| June 13 | Arizona | Johnny Rosenblatt Stadium • Omaha, NE | L 8–10 | 24–7–1 | 2–2 |
