= 1963 Penn State Nittany Lions baseball team =

American college baseball season

1963 Penn State Nittany Lions baseball

College World Series, 6th
- Conference: Independent
- CB: No. 5
- Record: 14–6
- Head coach: Chuck Medlar (1st season)
- Assistant coaches: Kepler; Smith
- Captain: David Felak
- Home stadium: New Beaver Field

The 1963 Penn State Nittany Lions baseball team represented Pennsylvania State University in the 1963 NCAA University Division baseball season. The head coach was Chuck Medlar, serving his first year.

The Nittany Lions lost in the College World Series, defeated by the Texas Longhorns.

== Roster ==
1963 Penn State Nittany Lions baseball team
Players
Coaches

#	Pos.	Name	B/T	Height	Weight	Year	Home town
		Richard Anderson	/	—	—
		Richard Bee	/	—	—
		Walter Bloom	/	—	—
	INF	Bart Brodkin	/	—	—
		David Dobrosielski	/	—	—
		Fredrick Engle	/	—	—
		David Felak (C)	/	—	—
		James Felton	/	—	—
	LHP	Bob Fenton	/L	—	—
		Edward Giegucz	/	—	—
		John Gregory	/	—	—
		James Jennison	/	—	—
		Edward Kmit	/	—	—
		Fred Light	/	—	—
5	INF	Pete Liske	/	—	—
		Joel Melville	/	—	—
	RHP	Richard Noe	/R	—	—
		Elmar Praul	/	—	—
		John Reidell	/	—	—
		Robert Rodenhaver	/	—	—
		Jeff Spanier	/	—	—
		Edward Springer	/	—	—
	P	Dick Stellman	/	—	—
		James Werner	/	—	—
		Ralph Wert	/	—	—
		Michael Williams	/	—	—

Head coach

Chuck Medlar

Assistant coach(es)

Kepler
Smith

Legend

- (C) Team captain
- (S) Suspended
- (I) Ineligible
- Injured
- Current redshirt

== Schedule ==
1963 Penn State Nittany Lions baseball game log
Regular season
April (8–1)

#	Date	Opponent	Site/stadium	Score	Overall record
1	April 2	at Gettysburg	Unknown • Gettysburg, Pennsylvania	9–0	1–0
2	April 4	Bucknell	New Beaver Field • University Park, Pennsylvania	7–3	2–0
3	April 6	Lehigh	New Beaver Field • University Park, Pennsylvania	8–6	3–0
4	April 11	at Cornell	Hoy Field • Ithaca, New York	17–0	4–0
5	April 17	Villanova	New Beaver Field • University Park, Pennsylvania	3–1	5–0
6	April 20	Rutgers	New Beaver Field • University Park, Pennsylvania	4–5	5–1
7	April 22	at Bucknell	Unknown • Lewisburg, Pennsylvania	9–1	6–1
8	April 29	at Maryland	Shipley Field • College Park, Maryland	3–2	7–1
9	April 29	at Maryland	Shipley Field • College Park, Maryland	5–1	8–1

May (3–3)

#	Date	Opponent	Site/stadium	Score	Overall record
10	May 3	Lafayette	New Beaver Field • University Park, Pennsylvania	6–2	9–1
11	May 4	Army	New Beaver Field • University Park, Pennsylvania	1–3	9–2
12	May 14	at Navy	Unknown • Annapolis, Maryland	5–6	9–3
13	May 16	at West Virginia	Unknown • Morgantown, West Virginia	4–5	9–4
14	May 21	at Temple	Erny Field • Philadelphia, Pennsylvania	5–0	10–4
15	May 25	Delaware	New Beaver Field • University Park, Pennsylvania	2–1	11–4

Postseason
District II Tournament (2–0)

#	Date	Opponent	Site/stadium	Score	Overall record
16	May 31	vs Rider	Bill Clarke Field • Princeton, New Jersey	3–0	12–4
17	May 31	St. John's	Bill Clarke Field • Princeton, New Jersey	11–2	13–4

1963 College World Series (1–2)

#	Date	Opponent	Site/stadium	Score	Overall record
16	June 10	vs Arizona	Omaha Municipal Stadium • Omaha, Nebraska	1–8	13–5
17	June 11	vs Western Michigan	Omaha Municipal Stadium • Omaha, Nebraska	3–0	14–5
18	June 12	vs Texas	Omaha Municipal Stadium • Omaha, Nebraska	4–6	14–6
