= 1963 NCAA University Division baseball tournament =

American college sports championship

- Season: 1963
- Teams: 23
- Finals site: Johnny Rosenblatt Stadium; Omaha, NE
- Champions: Southern California (4th title)
- Runner-up: Arizona (4th CWS Appearance)
- Winning coach: Rod Dedeaux (4th title)
- MOP: Bud Hollowell (Southern California)

The 1963 NCAA University Division baseball tournament was played at the end of the 1963 NCAA University Division baseball season to determine the national champion of college baseball. The tournament concluded with eight teams competing in the College World Series, a double-elimination tournament in its seventeenth year. Eight regional districts sent representatives to the College World Series with preliminary rounds within each district serving to determine each representative. These events would later become known as regionals. Each district had its own format for selecting teams, resulting in 23 teams participating in the tournament at the conclusion of their regular season, and in some cases, after a conference tournament. The College World Series was held in Omaha, NE from June 11 to June 16. The seventeenth tournament's champion was Southern California, coached by Rod Dedeaux. The Most Outstanding Player was Bud Hollowell of Southern California.

== Regionals ==
The opening rounds of the tournament were played across seven district sites across the country, each consisting of a field of two to four teams. Each district tournament, except District 2, was double-elimination. The winners of each district advanced to the College World Series.

Bold indicates winner. * indicates extra innings.

=== District 1 ===
Holy Cross vs. Boston College was played at Newton, Massachusetts and Connecticut vs. Providence and Providence vs. Holy Cross were played at Worcester, Massachusetts.

Semifinals
**Holy Cross**	**4**	**7**	—
Boston College	0	4	—
Connecticut	**4**^{10}	3	6
**Providence**	3	**4**	**10**

Finals
**Holy Cross**	**11**	**7**	—
Providence	0	4	—

* Indicates game required 10 innings.

=== District 2 at Princeton, NJ ===
Semifinals
Rider	0
**Penn State**	**3**
Temple	0
**St. John's**	**7**

Finals
**Penn State**	**11**
St. John's	2

=== District 3 at Gastonia, NC ===
Upper round 1
**Wake Forest**	**4**
West Virginia	3
Auburn	3
**Florida State**	**4**
Lower round 1
**West Virginia**	**2**
Auburn	1

Upper final
Wake Forest	4
**Florida State**	**12**
Lower final
**Wake Forest**	**12**
West Virginia	8

Final
Florida State	5	**11**
Wake Forest	**6**	5

=== District 4 at Champaign, IL ===
Upper round 1
Valparaiso	2
**Illinois**	**13**
**Western Michigan**	**2**
Notre Dame	1
Lower round 1
Valparaiso	2
**Notre Dame**	**5**

Upper final
Illinois	0
**Western Michigan**	**1**
Lower final
**Illinois**	**4**
Notre Dame	0

Final
**Western Michigan**	0	**7**
Illinois	**8**	0

=== District 5 at Columbia, MO ===
Finals
Saint Louis	0	**2**	1
**Missouri**	**16**	1	**7**

=== District 6 ===
Texas automatically qualified for the College World Series out of District 6.

=== District 7 at Tucson, AZ ===
Finals
Colorado	0	0	—
**Arizona**	**13**	**10**	—

=== District 8 at Corvallis, OR ===
Finals
**Southern California**	**6**	6	**7**
Oregon State	5	**8**	5

== College World Series ==
=== Participants ===
School	Conference	Record (conference)	Head coach	CWS appearances	CWS best finish	CWS record
Arizona	WAC	35–15 (8–4)	Frank Sancet	6 (last: 1960)	2nd (1956, 1958)	12–12
Florida State	n/a	25–11 (n/a)	Danny Litwhiler	2 (last: 1962)	4th (1962)	2–4
Holy Cross	n/a	13–8 (n/a)	Albert Riopel	3 (last: 1962)	1st (1952)	9–5
Missouri	Big 8	21–4 (15–3)	Hi Simmons	4 (last: 1962)	1st (1954)	12–7
Penn State	n/a	13–4 (n/a)	Chuck Medlar	3 (last: 1959)	2nd (1957)	7–6
Texas	SWC	19–15–1 (12–3)	Bibb Falk	7 (last: 1962)	1st (1949, 1950)	17–11
Southern California	CIBA	30–9 (10–6)	Rod Dedeaux	7 (last: 1961)	1st (1948, 1958, 1961)	19–10
Western Michigan	MAC	24–4 (12–0)	Charlie Maher	5 (last: 1961)	2nd (1955)	9–10

=== Results ===
==== Bracket ====
Upper round 1
Arizona	8
Penn State	1
Florida State	5
Western Michigan	2
Texas	8
Southern California	3
Missouri	3
Holy Cross	0

Upper round 2
Arizona	4^{11}
Florida State	3
Missouri	3
Texas	2
Lower round 1
Penn State	3
Western Michigan	0
Southern California	6
Holy Cross	5

Upper final
Arizona	6
Missouri	4
Lower round 2
Texas	6^{10}
Penn State	4
Florida State	3
Southern California	4

Semifinals
Arizona	10
Texas	8
Missouri	3
Southern California	12

Final
Arizona	4	2
Southern California	6	5

==== Game results ====
Date	Game	Winner	Score	Loser	Notes
June 10	Game 1	Arizona	8–1	Penn State	
June 10	Game 2	Florida State	5–2	Western Michigan	
June 10	Game 3	Texas	8–3	Southern California	
June 10	Game 4	Missouri	3–0	Holy Cross	
June 11	Game 5	Penn State	3–0	Western Michigan	Western Michigan eliminated
June 11	Game 6	Southern California	6–5	Holy Cross	Holy Cross eliminated
June 11	Game 7	Arizona	4–3 (11 innings)	Florida State	
June 11	Game 8	Missouri	3–2	Texas	
June 12	Game 9	Texas	6–4 (10 innings)	Penn State	Penn State eliminated
June 12	Game 10	Southern California	4–3	Florida State	Florida State eliminated
June 12	Game 11	Arizona	6–4	Missouri	
June 13	Game 12	Southern California	12–3	Missouri	Missouri eliminated
June 13	Game 13	Arizona	10–8	Texas	Texas eliminated
June 14	Game 14	Southern California	6–4	Arizona	
June 16	Final	Southern California	5–2	Arizona	Southern California wins CWS

=== All-Tournament Team ===
The following players were members of the All-Tournament Team.

Position	Player	School
P	Doug Holliker	Arizona
P	Walt Peterson	USC
C	Bud Hollowell (MOP)	USC
1B	Gary Holman	USC
2B	Ron Theobald	Arizona
3B	Dale Harvey	Missouri
SS	Woody Woodward	Florida State
OF	Hector Barnetche	Arizona
OF	Craig Morrison	Arizona
OF	Kenny Washington	USC

=== Notable players ===
- Arizona: Ron Theobald, Bart Zeller
- Florida State: Ken Suarez
- Holy Cross: Dick Joyce, John Peterman
- Missouri: John Sevcik
- Penn State:
- Southern California: Gary Holman, Rene Lachemann
- Texas: Bill Bethea, Chuck Hartenstein
- Western Michigan: Greg Bollo

== See also ==
- 1963 NAIA World Series
