= Shaun Fitzmaurice =

American baseball player (born 1942)

- Outfielder
- Born: August 25, 1942 (age 83); Worcester, Massachusetts, U.S.
- Batted: Right Threw: Right

MLB debut
- September 9, 1966, for the New York Mets

Last MLB appearance
- October 2, 1966, for the New York Mets

MLB statistics
- Batting average: .154
- Runs batted in: 0
- Runs scored: 2
- Stats at Baseball Reference

Teams
- New York Mets (1966)

Shaun Earle Fitzmaurice (born August 25, 1942) is an American former professional baseball outfielder. He played in Major League Baseball (MLB) for the New York Mets in 1966.

== Biography ==
Fitzmaurice graduated from Wellesley High School in Wellesley, Massachusetts. He hit an inside-the-park home run in a high school All-Star baseball game at Yankee Stadium in 1961. He then played college baseball for the Notre Dame Fighting Irish. He represented the United States in baseball at the 1964 Summer Olympics as a demonstration sport in Tokyo.

Fitzmaurice's professional career spanned 1964 to 1973; he played for farm teams of the New York Mets, Pittsburgh Pirates, New York Yankees, and Atlanta Braves. His only MLB appearances came with the Mets in 1966; in nine games as a September call-up, he had two singles in 13 at-bats and scored two runs. He had his first MLB hit in his first start on September 28. In the minor leagues, he played in over 800 games, primarily at the Triple-A level.
