= 1963 Florida State Seminoles baseball team =

American college baseball season

1963 Florida State Seminoles baseball

NCAA District 3 champions

College World Series, 1–2
- Conference: Independent
- Record: 26–13
- Head coach: Danny Litwhiler (9th year)
- Home stadium: Seminole Field

1963 NCAA University Division District 3 baseball independents standings
	Conf.				Overall
Team	W		L	PCT	W		L	PCT
Campbell ‍‍‍		–		–	11	–	5	.688
No. 6 Florida State ‍‍‍^{y}		–		–	26	–	13	.667
Elon ‍‍‍		–		–	19	–	15	.559
Georgetown ‍‍‍		–		–	8	–	9	.471
Mercer ‍‍‍		–		–	8	–	13	.381
Jacksonville ‍‍‍		–		–	10	–	18	.357
Stetson ‍‍‍		–		–	5	–	20	.200
y – Invited to the NCAA tournament As of June 30, 1963; Rankings from Collegiate Baseball

The 1963 Florida State Seminoles baseball team represented Florida State University in the 1963 NCAA University Division baseball season. The Seminoles played their home games at Seminole Field. The team was coached by Danny Litwhiler in his ninth and final season at Florida State.

The Seminoles reached the College World Series, on their third appearance in Omaha, where they finished tied for fifth place after recording an opening round win against Western Michigan, then losing against eventual runner-up Arizona and the eventual champions were Southern California.

== Personnel ==
=== Roster ===
1963 Florida State Seminoles roster
Pitchers: - Tom Davis - Junior; - Frank Echols - Senior; - Bob Kull - Sophomore; - Wally Malphrus P; - Don Murray - Sophomore; 15 - Marty Howell - Junior; 24 - Dave Dahlen - Sophomore; 27 - Allen Thomas - Senior; 31 - Gary Williamson - Junior; 33 - Al Beccaccio - (redshirt) Senior; 37 - Butch Ferrar - Senior	Catchers: 14 - Ken Suarez - Sophomore; 19 - Kent Stille - Sophomore; 35 - Bud Teagle - Senior; 38 - Paul Dirks - Junior; Infielders: 11 - Jim Reed - Junior; 22 - Billy Williamson - Senior; 23 - Larry Johnson - Junior; 30 - Woody Woodward - Junior; 32 - George Rountree - Junior; 36 - Gerry Chmielewski - Sophomore	Outfielders: - Bill Hancock - Junior; - Jim Loftin - Sophomore; - John McConnaughhay - Senior; 8 - Gary Nichols - Sophomore; 12 - Mike Augustine - Junior; 16 - Woody Litwhiler - Junior; 20 - Monty McBryde - Sophomore; Unknown: - Seward; - Woodard

=== Coaches ===
1963 Florida State Seminoles baseball coaching staff
- Danny Litwhiler – Head coach – 9th year

== Schedule and results ==
Legend
Florida State win
Florida State loss

1963 Florida State Seminoles baseball game log
Regular season

March
Date	Opponent	Site/stadium	Score	Overall record
Mar 16	Auburn	Seminole Field • Tallahassee, FL	W 2–1	1–0
Mar 18	Auburn	Seminole Field • Tallahassee, FL	W 8–3	2–0
Mar 21	Clemson	Seminole Field • Tallahassee, FL	W 10–7	3–0
Mar 22	Clemson	Seminole Field • Tallahassee, FL	L 7–12	3–1
Mar 23	Clemson	Seminole Field • Tallahassee, FL	W 12–3	4–1
Mar 23	Navy	Seminole Field • Tallahassee, FL	L 7–8	4–2
Mar 25	at Auburn	Plainsman Park • Auburn, AL	W 5–1	5–2
Mar 26	at Auburn	Plainsman Park • Auburn, AL	W 9–7	6–2
Mar 30	at Florida Southern	Lakeland, FL	W 6–0	7–2

April
Date	Opponent	Site/stadium	Score	Overall record
Apr 1	at Miami (FL)	Miami Field • Miami, FL	W 2–1	8–2
Apr 2	at Miami (FL)	Miami Field • Miami, FL	L 1–4	8–3
Apr 5	Furman	Seminole Field • Tallahassee, FL	W 13–3	9–3
Apr 6	Furman	Seminole Field • Tallahassee, FL	W 9–2	10–3
Apr 9	Valdosta State	Seminole Field • Tallahassee, FL	W 14–0	11–3
Apr 20	at Georgia Southern	Statesboro, GA	W 10–8	12–3
Apr 22	at North Carolina	Emerson Field • Chapel Hill, NC	W 5–2	13–3
Apr 23	at Wake Forest	Ernie Shore Field • Winston-Salem, NC	L 5–7	13–4
Apr 24	at NC State	Riddick Stadium • Raleigh, NC	L 7–8^{11}	13–5
Apr 25	at Duke	Jack Coombs Field • Durham, NC	W 6–0	14–5
Apr 26	at East Carolina	Greenville, NC	W 6–1	15–5
Apr 27	at Camp Lejeune	Marine Corps Base Camp Lejeune • Jacksonville, NC	L 5–6	15–6

May
Date	Opponent	Site/stadium	Score	Overall record
May 3	at Florida	Perry Field • Gainesville, FL	L 1–3	15–7
May 4	at Florida	Perry Field • Gainesville, FL	L 3–6	15–8
May 13	Georgia Southern	Seminole Field • Tallahassee, FL	W 10–6	16–8
May 14	Georgia Southern	Seminole Field • Tallahassee, FL	W 7–0	17–8
May 16	at Georgia Tech	Rose Bowl Field • Atlanta, GA	W 10–5	18–8
May 16	at Georgia Tech	Rose Bowl Field • Atlanta, GA	L 4–5	18–9
May 17	at Georgia	Freshman Field • Athens, GA	W 9–6	19–9
May 18	at Georgia	Freshman Field • Athens, GA	W 4–3	20–9
May 24	Florida	Seminole Field • Tallahassee, FL	W 6–2	21–9
May 25	Florida	Seminole Field • Tallahassee, FL	W 5–1	22–9
May 25	Florida	Seminole Field • Tallahassee, FL	L 1–3	22–10

Postseason

NCAA District 3 playoff
Date	Opponent	Site/stadium	Score	Overall record	NCAAT record
May 30	Auburn	Sims Legion Park • Gastonia, NC	W 4–3	23–10	1–0
May 31	Wake Forest	Sims Legion Park • Gastonia, NC	W 12–4	24–10	2–0
June 2	Wake Forest	Sims Legion Park • Gastonia, NC	L 5–6	24–11	2–1
June 4	Wake Forest	Sims Legion Park • Gastonia, NC	W 11–5	25–11	3–1

College World Series
Date	Opponent	Site/stadium	Score	Overall record	CWS record
June 10	Western Michigan	Johnny Rosenblatt Stadium • Omaha, NE	W 5–2	26–11	1–0
June 11	Arizona	Johnny Rosenblatt Stadium • Omaha, NE	L 3–4^{11}	26–12	1–1
June 12	Southern California	Johnny Rosenblatt Stadium • Omaha, NE	L 3–4	26–13	1–2
