= 1963 West Virginia Mountaineers baseball team =

American college baseball season

1963 West Virginia Mountaineers baseball

Southern Conference Champions

NCAA District 3 Regionals, 1-2
- Conference: Southern Conference

Ranking
- Coaches: No. 11
- Record: 30-3 (13-1 SoCon)
- Head coach: Steve Harrick (16th season)
- Home stadium: Hawley Field

1963 Southern Conference baseball standings
	Conf.				Overall
Team	W		L	PCT	W		L	PCT
No. 11 West Virginia ‍†‍‍^{y}	13	–	1	.929	30	–	3	.909
Virginia Tech ‍‍‍	10	–	1	.909	14	–	7	.667
Richmond ‍‍‍	9	–	5	.643	10	–	8	.556
VMI ‍‍‍	7	–	7	.500	14	–	11	.560
The Citadel ‍‍‍	4	–	7	.364	9	–	10	.474
George Washington ‍‍‍	4	–	8	.333	4	–	13	.235
Furman ‍‍‍	3	–	7	.300	7	–	16	.304
Davidson ‍‍‍	4	–	10	.286	8	–	18	.308
William & Mary ‍‍‍	1	–	9	.100	2	–	14	.125
† – Conference champion y – Invited to the NCAA Tournament; As of June 30, 1963; Rankings from Collegiate Baseball

The 1963 West Virginia Mountaineers baseball team represented West Virginia University during the 1963 NCAA University Division baseball season. The Mountaineers played their home games at Hawley Field as a member of the Southern Conference. They were led by head coach Steve Harrick, in his 16th season at West Virginia. They would finish the season 30-3, winning the Southern Conference championship and playing in the NCAA District 3 Regionals.
