= Nippon Express =

Japanese global logistics services company

Nippon Express Co., Ltd.
- Logo used since 2022

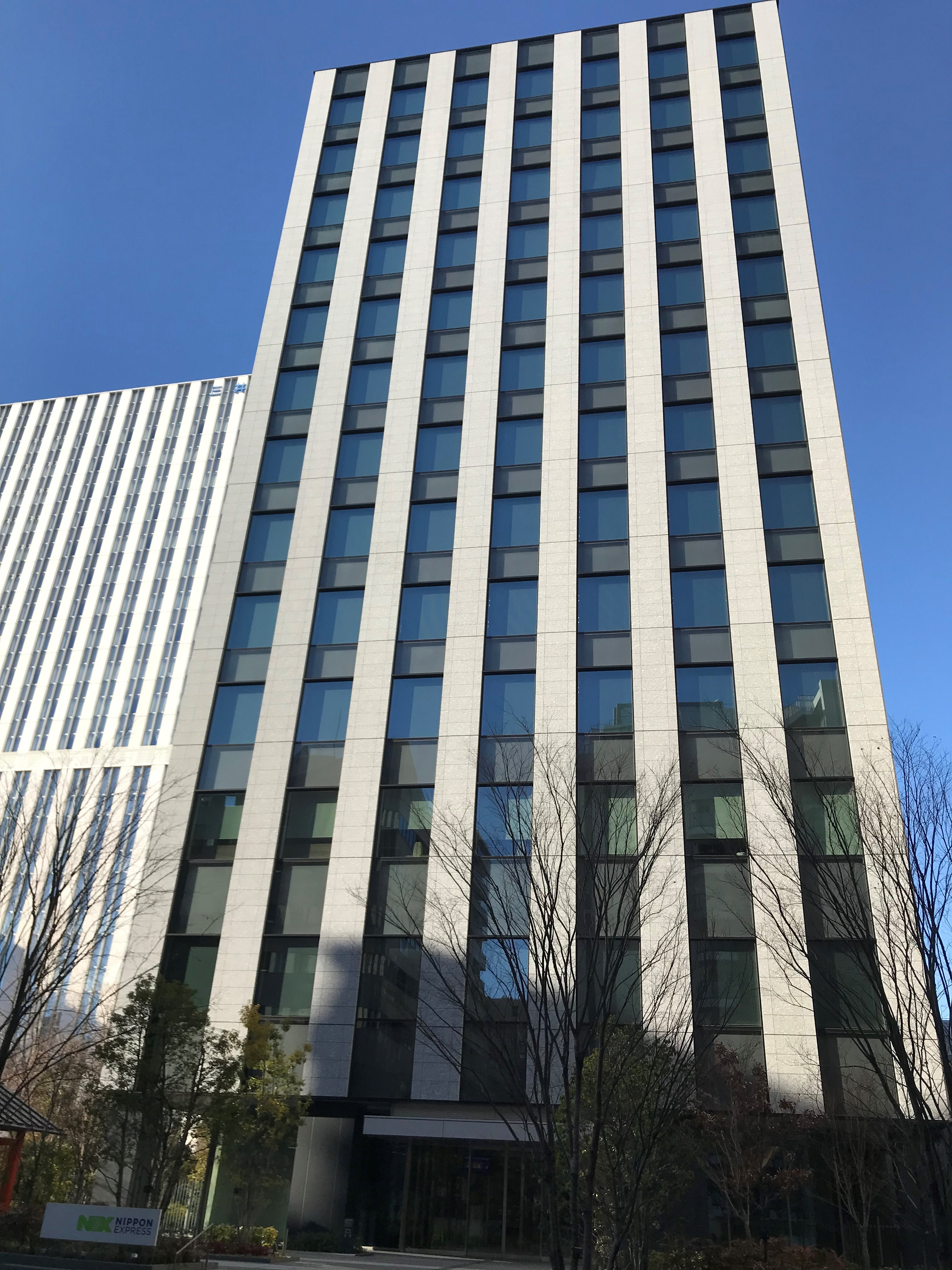
- Headquarters in Chiyoda, Tokyo
- Native name: 日本通運株式会社
- Romanized name: Nippon Tsūun Kabushiki-gaisha
- Type: Subsidiary
- Traded as: TYO: 9062
- Industry: Logistics
- Founded: June 1872; 154 years ago
- Headquarters: Izumichō, Chiyoda, Tokyo, Japan
- Owner: Nippon Express Holdings
- Website: www.nittsu.co.jp

Nippon Express Co., Ltd. (日本通運株式会社, Nippon Tsūun Kabushiki-gaisha; Nittsu) is a global logistics services company. It is based in Tokyo, Japan and is a wholly owned subsidiary of Nippon Express Holdings.

As of December 31, 2023, its major shareholders include The Master Trust Bank of Japan (14.5%), Custody Bank Of Japan (7.4%), Asahi Mutual Life Insurance (6.4%), Sompo Japan Insurance (4.1%), and Nippon Express Employees' Shareholding Association (4.6%).

In Japan it is commonly known as 'Nittsu', and some of Nippon Express subsidiaries include 'Nittsu' in their names.

== History ==
Logo used until 2022

The company was established in 1937 in line with the Nippon Tsu-un Kaisha Law as a semi-government transportation service by pooling the assets of Kokusai Tsu-un KK (International Express Co., Ltd.), which consolidated many of the nation's small-scale rail transport companies, and six other competitors, with additional funding from the Japanese government. After more than a decade of operation the company was fully privatized in the 1950s.

In 1989, Nippon Express had 45,000 employees.

Nippon Express began using its current corporate identity on January 4, 2022.

== Activities ==
At the end of 2013, Nippon Express Co., Ltd. bought 67 percent of Panasonic Logistics, which is owned by Japanese electronics group Panasonic Corp.

Nippon Express indicated in September, 2017, its plan to raise 100 billion yen in debt capital over two years to consolidate several warehouses in the Tokyo, Osaka, and Nagoya regions. The company also planned to install labor-saving equipment, and to build transit warehouses in overseas locations, such as Thailand, Malaysia, and Indonesia.

On January 4, 2022, the company implemented a new brand identity, in accordance with the transition to a holding company structure in the same month. The company has used "NX," the shortened form of NIPPON EXPRESS, as the group brand.

On October 1, 2026, Nippon Express Holdings completed its acquisition of Canadian contract logistics company Metro Supply Chain Group. The transaction valued Metro at C$1.8 billion, with an additional earnout of up to C$400 million contingent on financial targets.
