= Hop Riopel =

American athlete and coach (1900–1966)

Biographical details
- Born: October 11, 1900; Worcester, Massachusetts, U.S.
- Died: September 4, 1966 (aged 65); Worcester, Massachusetts, U.S.

Playing career

Baseball
- 1921–1924: Holy Cross
- 1923–1924: Fitchburg
- 1928–1929: Lewiston Twins

Football
- 1920–1923: Holy Cross
- 1924–1925: Providence Steamrollers

Basketball
- 1921–1924: Holy Cross

Coaching career (HC unless noted)

Football
- 1924–1932: Milford HS (MA)
- 1933–1942: Holy Cross (freshmen)
- 1943–1947: Holy Cross (varsity assistant)
- 1948–1959: Holy Cross (freshmen)

Basketball
- 1928–1933: Assumption
- 1933–1934: Holy Cross (freshmen)
- 1934–1935: Holy Cross
- 1942–1945: Holy Cross

Baseball
- 1930–1932: Milford HS (MA)
- 1933–1960: Holy Cross (freshmen)
- 1961–1966: Holy Cross

Head coaching record
- Overall: 14–34 (basketball); 82–43 (baseball)

Albert Didace "Hop" Riopel (October 11, 1900 – September 4, 1966) was an American athlete and coach who played for the Providence Steamrollers of the National Football League. After starring at three sports at the College of the Holy Cross, Riopel played both professional football and baseball. He returned to Holy Cross as a coach in 1933 and remained there until his death in 1966.

== Playing ==
Riopel was born on October 11, 1900 in Worcester, Massachusetts. His mother died when he was one and his father died four years later, so his sister raised Riopel and his nine siblings. He was a member of the baseball, basketball, football, and indoor and outdoor track teams at Worcester Commerce High School. He was offered a tryout with the New York Yankees after graduating, but chose to pursue a college education. He entered the College of the Holy Cross in the fall of 1920 and made the varsity football team as a freshman. He played fullback and was elected captain of the 1923 Holy Cross football team. He also spent three seasons as a starting guard for the Holy Cross basketball team and played first base, third base, and outfield for the Holy Cross baseball team. In 1923 and 1924, he played summer baseball for the Fitchburg team in the Central Massachusetts League. During the 1923 season, he had a 34 game hitting streak. After graduating, Riopel went to New York City to meet with John McGraw of the New York Giants and Clark Griffith of the Washington Senators. However, Riopel chose to remain in Worcester with his family rather than pursue a major league career.

In 1924, Riopel signed with the Providence Steamrollers. The team joined the National Football League for the 1925 season and Riopel appeared in four games that year.

In 1928 and 1929, Riopel played for the Lewiston Twins of the New England League. He appeared in 141 games, batting .277 with 4 home runs over those two seasons.

== Coaching ==
Riopel began his coaching career in 1924 at Milford High School in Milford, Massachusetts. In 1928, he became the head basketball coach at Assumption College.

In 1933, Riopel returned to Holy Cross as freshman football, baseball, and basketball coach. When basketball returned as a varsity sport in 1934, Riopel served as the head coach. He served as second stint as varsity basketball coach during World War II.

In addition to serving as freshman coach, Riopel was the chief scout for the Crusaders football team and head coach Ank Scanlan credited his scouting report for helping Holy Cross beat top ranked rival Boston College in 1942 season finale. Riopel served as a varsity assistant during World War II because freshmen were allowed to play for varsity teams. When Ox DaGrosa resigned in 1947, he publicly recommended Riopel as his successor. However, Riopel chose to remain as freshman coach because it had more job security.

From 1947 to 1950, Riopel was a member of the Massachusetts Boxing Commission. In 1956, he was a Republican candidate for the Worcester County commission.

In 1961, longtime Holy Cross baseball coach Jack Barry died and Riopel was chosen to succeed him. His 1962 and 1963 Crusaders baseball teams played in the College World Series. He retired from his fulltime position in the Holy Cross athletic department in June 1966, but was retained as baseball coach. However, that August, he suffered a heart attack and died a week later at Saint Vincent Hospital in Worcester.
