= 1963 Holy Cross Crusaders baseball team =

American college baseball season

1963 Holy Cross Crusaders baseball

District I champions

College World Series, T-7th
- Conference: Independent
- CB: No. 7
- Record: 13–10
- Head coach: Albert Riopel (3rd season)
- Home stadium: Fitton Field

The 1963 Holy Cross Crusaders baseball team represented the College of the Holy Cross in the 1963 NCAA University Division baseball season. The Crusaders played their home games at Fitton Field. The team was coached by Albert Riopel in his 3rd year as head coach at Holy Cross.

The Crusaders won the District I playoff to advance to the College World Series, where they were defeated by the Southern California Trojans.

== Roster ==
1963 Holy Cross Crusaders baseball team
Players
Coaches

#	Pos.	Name	B/T	Height	Weight	Year	Home town
	INF	Tony Arena	/	—	—
		Joe Armstrong	/	—	—
		Jim Bidwell	/	—	—
	OF	Tony Capo (C)	/	5 ft 7 in (1.7 m)	—	Sr
		Hank Cutting	/	—	—
	C	Bob Hargraves	/	—	—
18		Jim Holloran	/R	—	—
		Tom Jordan	/	—	—	Jr
	P	Dick Joyce	/	—	—	So
	INF	Bud Knittel	/	—	—	So
		Rick Manning	/	—	—
	INF	Paul Morano	/	—	—
		Tim Murtaugh	/	—	—
19	INF	John Peterman	/R	—	—	Sr
		Bill Prizio	/R	—	—
	P	Don Riedl	/	—	—	Sr	Worcester, Massachusetts
		Bill Sexton	/	—	—
	P	Mike Skane	/L	—	—
	P	Paul Symeon	/	—	—
		John Wendelken	/	—	—
		Ed Widronak	/	—	—	So

Head coach

Albert Riopel

Assistant coach(es)

Legend

- (C) Team captain
- (S) Suspended
- (I) Ineligible
- Injured
- Current redshirt

Roster
Last update: October 2, 2021

== Schedule ==
1963 Holy Cross Crusaders baseball game log
Regular season
April (3–1)

#	Date	Opponent	Site/stadium	Score	Overall record
1	April 19	Connecticut	Fitton Field • Worcester, Massachusetts	6–1	1–0
2	April 20	Ithaca	Fitton Field • Worcester, Massachusetts	5–9	1–1
3	April 25	Assumption	Unknown • Worcester, Massachusetts	12–0	2–1
4	April 27	Dartmouth	Fitton Field • Worcester, Massachusetts	2–1	3–1

May (5–3)

#	Date	Opponent	Site/stadium	Score	Overall record
5	May 1	at Providence	Unknown • Providence, Rhode Island	1–2	3–2
6	May 3	AIC	Fitton Field • Worcester, Massachusetts	8–2	4–2
7	May 4	Boston University	Fitton Field • Worcester, Massachusetts	19–1	5–2
8	May 8	Brown	Fitton Field • Worcester, Massachusetts	3–9	5–3
9	May 13	at Harvard	Soldier's Field • Cambridge, Massachusetts	2–1	6–3
10	May	Providence	Unknown • Unknown	10–1	7–3
11	May 21	at UMass	Unknown • Amherst, Massachusetts	1–2	7–4
12	May	Amherst	Unknown • Unknown	15–1	8–4

Postseason
District I Playoff (2–0)

#	Date	Opponent	Site/stadium	Score	Overall record
13	May 29	Boston College	John Shea Field • Chestnut Hill, Massachusetts	4–0	9–4
14	May 29	at Boston College	John Shea Field • Chestnut Hill, Massachusetts	7–4	10–4

May (0–1)

#	Date	Opponent	Site/stadium	Score	Overall record
15	May 30	at Boston College	John Shea Field • Chestnut Hill, Massachusetts	3–6	10–5

District I Playoff (2–0)

#	Date	Opponent	Site/stadium	Score	Overall record
16	June 1	Providence	Fitton Field • Worcester, Massachusetts	11–0	11–5
17	June 1	Providence	Fitton Field • Worcester, Massachusetts	7–4	12–5

June (1–3)

#	Date	Opponent	Site/stadium	Score	Overall record
18	June 3	at Dartmouth	Red Rolfe Field • Hanover, New Hampshire	3–6	12–6
19	June	Yale	Unknown • Unknown	2–3	12–7
20	June	Boston College	Unknown • Unknown	0–3	12–8
21	June	Boston College	Unknown • Unknown	17–2	13–8

College World Series (0–2)

#	Date	Opponent	Site/stadium	Score	Overall record
22	June 10	vs Missouri	Omaha Municipal Stadium • Omaha, Nebraska	0–3	13–9
23	June 11	vs Southern California	Omaha Municipal Stadium • Omaha, Nebraska	5–6	13–10
