= Bud Hollowell =

American baseball player (1943–2014)

Buddy Hollowell
- Born: January 1, 1943; Long Beach, California, U.S.
- Died: May 16, 2014 (aged 71); Lakeland, Florida, U.S.
- Batted: Right Threw: Right
- Stats at Baseball Reference

Buddy Ryan "Bud" Hollowell (January 1, 1943 – May 16, 2014) was an American professional baseball player and minor league manager. After his athletic career, he became an educator and author.

== Athletic career ==
Hollowell was born and raised in Long Beach, California where he was a multi-sport standout at Long Beach Polytechnic High School. He was the quarterback on the 1959 and 1960 Polytechnic football teams that went 22–0–1 and claimed two California Interscholastic Federation titles. Afterwards, he enrolled at the University of Southern California and played for the USC Trojans baseball team as a catcher, helping them reach the finals of the 1963 College World Series, where they defeated the Arizona Wildcats baseball team to claim the national championship. He was named the 1963 College World Series Most Outstanding Player, hitting for a .350 batting average and setting a home run record that still stands, although it has since been tied by several players. Hollowell also represented the United States in baseball at the 1964 Summer Olympics as a demonstration sport in Tokyo.

Hollowell played for the Alaska Goldpanners of Fairbanks of the Alaska Baseball League in 1964, hitting .316 with 14 homer runs and 71 RBI for them and winning the team's MVP award. While playing for the Goldpanners, he would be the catcher for future Baseball Hall of Fame pitcher, Tom Seaver. He later coached for them in 1975, 1983 and 1997.

From 1965 to 1969 he played professionally in the Los Angeles Dodgers organization, although he never reached the major leagues. In 1965 he played for the Santa Barbara Dodgers and Pocatello Chiefs, hitting a combined .271 with 11 home runs. He played for Santa Barbara again in 1966, hitting .256 with 12 home runs. In 1967, he played for Santa Barbara once more, hitting .279 with 14 home runs and 68 RBI. He played for the Albuquerque Dodgers in 1968, hitting .270 with 11 home runs and 54 RBI. In 1969, his final professional season, he again played for Albuquerque, hitting .291 with three home runs and 21 RBI.

From 1970 to 1971, he served as the manager of the Ogden Dodgers. He led them to a second-place finish in 1970 and a sixth-place finish in 1971. 1970 was the first year that they were not league champions.

== Educator and author ==
After his athletic career, he obtained a Ph.D., Master of Arts and Bachelor of Science in physical education from the University of Southern California. He taught for the University of Phoenix, where he was awarded Outstanding Professor of the Year three different times. He also served as the Area Chair of Philosophy & World Comparative Religions. Hollowell later served on the faculty of the American Military University where he taught undergraduate courses in management — sports medicine and sports & drugs. Other outstanding accomplishments include receiving Honorable Mention as an Outstanding Philosopher of the 20th Century, and a Peace and Freedom Citation from the State of Alaska for assisting Chinese students and dissidents escaping persecution after the Tiananmen Square protests of 1989. He is also co-founder of One World Insight, a nonprofit community organization dedicated to conscious aging for the purpose of becoming whole, not old.

Hollowell authored two books, The Eternal Dance, which discusses religion and spirituality and,The Quantum Gateway: At the intersection of Religion and Science. He had the honor of the Dalai Lama reading excerpts from The Eternal Dance in a daily teaching at the Temple in Dharamsala, India. He died in Lakeland, Florida, on May 16, 2014, due to prostate cancer.
