= Gary Holman (baseball) =

American baseball player (born 1944)

- First baseman / Outfielder
- Born: January 25, 1944 (age 82); Long Beach, California, U.S.
- Batted: Left Threw: Left

MLB debut
- June 26, 1968, for the Washington Senators

Last MLB appearance
- June 18, 1969, for the Washington Senators

MLB statistics
- Batting average: .259
- Home runs: 0
- Runs batted in: 9
- Stats at Baseball Reference

Teams
- Washington Senators (1968–1969)

Gary Richard Holman (born January 25, 1944) is an American former professional baseball player. A first baseman and outfielder, he appeared in 116 games over two seasons (1968–69) in Major League Baseball for the Washington Senators. Holman threw and batted left-handed, stood 6 feet 1 inch (1.85 m) tall and weighed 200 pounds (91 kg).

Holman originally signed with the Los Angeles Dodgers in 1964 after attending the University of Southern California. The Senators acquired him in the first-year player draft then in existence, developed him further in their farm system, and promoted him to their MLB roster in late June 1968 after 60 games in Triple-A. Holman started in 13 games, ten as an outfielder, for the last-place club, and appeared in 30 contests as a backup to the Senators' regular first baseman, Mike Epstein. He collected 25 hits, including five doubles and one triple, and posted a batting average of .294 in 75 games. As a result, he was named to the 1968 Topps All-Star Rookie team.

But in 1969, Holman struggled offensively, with only five hits in 31 at bats in limited service during the season's first two months. He was sent to the minor leagues in June, and retired from baseball at season's end.

As a big leaguer, he batted .259 with nine runs batted in.
