= Bill Bethea =

American baseball player (born 1942)

- Second baseman / Shortstop
- Born: January 1, 1942 (age 84); Houston, Texas, U.S.
- Batted: Right Threw: Right

MLB debut
- September 13, 1964, for the Minnesota Twins

Last MLB appearance
- September 29, 1964, for the Minnesota Twins

MLB statistics
- Batting average: .167
- Home runs: 0
- Runs batted in: 2
- Stats at Baseball Reference

Teams
- Minnesota Twins (1964)

William Lamar Bethea (born January 1, 1942), nicknamed "Spot", is an American former professional baseball player who appeared in ten games in the Major Leagues as an infielder for the 1964 Minnesota Twins. The native of Houston threw and batted right-handed, stood 6 feet (1.8 m) tall and weighed 175 pounds (79 kg). He attended the University of Texas at Austin.

Originally signed by the St. Louis Cardinals in 1963, Bethea batted .371 in the Pioneer League (then Class A) that season and was selected by the Twins in the first-year player draft then in effect. He spent most of 1964 with the Double–A Charlotte Hornets before his recall to Minnesota after the September 1 roster expansion.

In his first MLB at bat (in his fourth game played), on September 20, 1964, at Fenway Park, Bethea doubled off Ed Connolly of the Boston Red Sox, driving home Bob Allison from first base for his first run batted in in the Majors. It sparked the Twins to a 12–4 victory. In his brief big-league trial, however, Bethea collected only five total hits and two RBI in ten games played and 30 at bats. He returned to the minor leagues in 1965 and played through the 1969 season. He then served as an assistant coach for the Texas Longhorns baseball program for 21 years, working as an aide to Cliff Gustafson, before becoming head baseball coach of Arkansas State University from 1991–2002, compiling a 311–310 record.
