= 1947 Clemson Tigers baseball team =

American college baseball season

1947 Clemson Tigers baseball
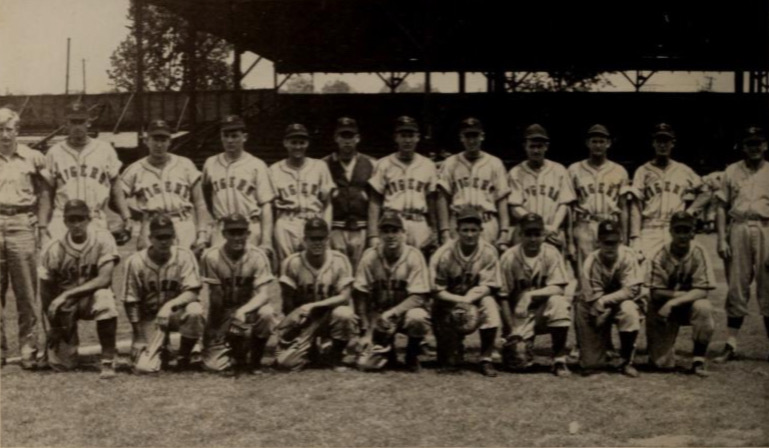

SoCon champions NCAA District III (South) champions

NCAA Eastern playoff, 0–1
- Conference: Southern Conference
- Record: 24–5 (13–2 SoCon)
- Head coach: Randy Hinson
- Home stadium: Riggs Field

1947 Southern Conference baseball standings
	Conf.				Overall
Team	W		L	PCT	W		L	PCT
Clemson ‍†‍‍^{y}	13	–	2	.867	24	–	5	.828
Richmond ‍‍‍	8	–	3	.727	20	–	3	.870
Duke ‍‍‍	13	–	6	.684		–		–
Virginia Tech ‍‍‍	4	–	3	.571	11	–	6	.647
Maryland ‍‍‍	4	–	3	.571	10	–	10	.500
Washington and Lee ‍‍‍	5	–	4	.556		–		–
North Carolina ‍‍‍	9	–	7	.563	15	–	11	.577
NC State ‍‍‍	7	–	8	.467		–		–
William & Mary ‍‍‍	6	–	8	.429	15	–	8	.652
Wake Forest ‍‍‍	6	–	8	.429	15	–	8	.652
Furman ‍‍‍	4	–	6	.400		–		–
South Carolina ‍‍‍	5	–	8	.385		–		–
VMI ‍‍‍	2	–	6	.250		–		–
The Citadel ‍‍‍	1	–	3	.250	2	–	5	.286
George Washington ‍‍‍	1	–	4	.200		–		–
Davidson ‍‍‍	0	–	10	.000		–		–
† – Conference champion As of June 30, 1947; Rankings from Collegiate Baseball

The 1947 Clemson Tigers baseball team represented Clemson University in the 1947 NCAA baseball season. The team played their home games at Riggs Field in Clemson, South Carolina.

The team was coached by Randy Hinson, who completed his fourth season at Clemson. The Tigers were invited to the first NCAA baseball tournament, where they fell to Yale in the first game in the history of the event.

Joe Landrum was named to the first college baseball All-America Team.

== Roster ==
1947 Clemson Tigers roster
Pitchers: - Joe Hazle - Freshman; - Joe Landrum - Sophomore; - Luther Rentz - Senior	Catchers: - Tom Cleveland - Sophomore; Infielders: - Frank Gillespie - Sophomore; - Lynwood McCakin - Senior; - Jack Moore - Freshman- Hale Sherard - Senior	Outfielders: - Tom Castles - Freshman; - Homer Coker - Junior; - Dewey Quinn - Senior	Unknown: - Ed Berry; - J. R. Brown; - Leo Fisher; - Ray Fleming; - William Griffith; - Jim Hazle; - Hardin Joyce; - Bill Martin; - Dan Stroud

== Schedule ==
Legend
	Clemson win
	Clemson loss
**Bold**	Clemson team member
*	Non-Conference game

1947 Clemson Tigers baseball game log
Regular season

March/April
Date	Opponent	Site/stadium	Score	Overall record	SoCon Record
Mar 25	NC State	Riggs Field • Clemson, SC	**W** 10–9	1–0	1–0
Mar 28	Duke	Riggs Field • Clemson, SC	**W** 10–9	2–0	2–0
Mar 29	Duke	Riggs Field • Clemson, SC	**L** 11–13	2–1	2–1
Apr 3	at Presbyterian*	Clinton, SC	**W** 8–2	3–1	
Apr 7	Wofford*	Riggs Field • Clemson, SC	**W** 4–3	4–1	
Apr 8	Davidson	Riggs Field • Clemson, SC	**W** 2–1	5–1	3–1
Apr 11	at South Carolina	Columbia, SC	**W** 4–1	6–1	4–1
Apr 12	at South Carolina	Columbia, SC	**W** 17–8	7–1	5–1
Apr 17	Georgia*	Riggs Field • Clemson, SC	**W** 7–2	8–1	
Apr 18	at The Citadel	WLI Field • Charleston, SC	**W** 14–4	9–1	6–1
Apr 21	at Georgia*	Ag. Hill • Athens, GA	**L** 7–8	9–2	
Apr 24	Newberry*	Riggs Field • Clemson, SC	**W** 9–4	10–2	
Apr 26	at Newberry*	Newberry, SC	**W** 10–5	11–2	
Apr 30	The Citadel	Riggs Field • Clemson, SC	**W** 8–5^{7}	12–2	7–1

May
Date	Opponent	Site/stadium	Score	Overall record	SoCon Record
May 2	at Erskine*	Due West, SC	**W** 5–4	13–2	
May 3	at Wofford*	Spartanburg, SC	**W** 11–5	14–2	
May 5	Furman	Riggs Field • Clemson, SC	**W** 19–7	15–2	8–1
May 6	at Furman	Greenville, SC	**L** 4–7	15–3	8–2
May 9	Erskine*	Riggs Field • Clemson, SC	**W** 3–2	16–3	
May 10	at Davidson	Davidson, NC	**W** 15–1	17–3	9–2
May 13	Furman	Riggs Field • Clemson, SC	**W** 9–6	18–3	10–2
May 14	at Furman	Greenville, SC	**W** 13–3	19–3	11–2
May 23	South Carolina	Riggs Field • Clemson, SC	**W** 17–3	20–3	12–2
May 24	South Carolina	Riggs Field • Clemson, SC	**W** 10–8	21–3	13–2

Postseason

NCAA District III (South) Playoff
Date	Opponent	Site/stadium	Score	Overall record	Playoff record
June 12	vs Auburn	Charlotte, NC	**W** 8–3	22–3	1–0
June 13	vs Alabama	Charlotte, NC	**W** 1–0	23–3	2–0
June 14	vs Alabama	Charlotte, NC	**L** 2–8	23–4	2–1
June 14	vs Alabama	Charlotte, NC	**W** 4–1	24–4	3–1

NCAA Eastern playoff
Date	Opponent	Site/stadium	Score	Overall record	Playoff record
June 20	at Yale	Yale Field • New Haven, CT	**L** 3–7	24–5	0–1

== Awards and honors ==
Joe Landrum

- All-America First team
