= 1947 College Baseball All-America Team =

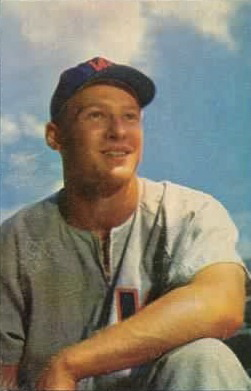
1947 All-Americans included 1958 AL MVP Jackie Jensen

This is a list of college baseball players named first team All-Americans for the 1947 NCAA baseball season. From 1947 to 1963, the American Baseball Coaches Association was the only generally recognized All-America selector, so any player selected by the ABCA is considered a "consensus" All-American.

== Key ==
A	American Baseball Coaches Association
	Member of the National College Baseball Hall of Fame
	Consensus All-American – selected the ABCA

== All-Americans ==
Position	Name	School	#	A
Pitcher	Nino Barnise	California	1	✓
Pitcher	Joe Landrum	Clemson	1	✓
Catcher	Lee Eilbracht	Illinois	1	✓
First baseman	Andy Phillip	Illinois	1	✓
Second baseman	Charlie Teague	Wake Forest	1	✓
Shortstop	Chuck Brayton	Washington State	1	✓
Third baseman	Gene Hooks	Wake Forest	1	✓
Outfielder	John Fiscalini	California	1	✓
Outfielder	Bill Howe	Yale	1	✓
Outfielder	Jackie Jensen	California	1	✓

== See also ==
- List of college baseball awards
