= John Fiscalini =

American baseball player

- Outfielder
- Born: February 25, 1925; San Bernardino, California, U.S.
- Died: December 17, 1982 (aged 57); San Bernardino, California, U.S.
- Batted: Right Threw: Unknown

John Alvin Fiscalini (February 25, 1925 – December 17, 1982) was an American college and minor league baseball outfielder.

Following a standout baseball career at San Bernardino High School, Fiscalini joined the United States Air Force upon his graduation in 1943. After the conclusion of World War II, Fiscalini attended the University of California at Berkeley, where he was a member of the Cal Golden Bears baseball team from 1946 to 1948.

In 1947, Fiscalini led the Golden Bears in hitting, earning First-Team All-American honors and leading Cal to the inaugural 1947 College World Series, where they defeated the Yale Bulldogs in the championship game. In 1948, Fiscalini signed with the Pittsburgh Pirates, spending time with the New Orleans Pelicans, Waco Pirates, Davenport Pirates, Charleston Rebels, and Albany Senators before retiring after the 1950 season.

Fiscalini Field in San Bernardino is named in his honor.
