= 1947 Yale Bulldogs baseball team =

American college baseball season

1947 Yale Bulldogs baseball

Eastern Intercollegiate Baseball League Champions NCAA tournament Eastern playoff champions College World Series runner-up
- Conference: Eastern Intercollegiate Baseball League
- Record: 19–10–1 (9–3 EIBL)
- Head coach: Ethan Allen (2nd season)
- Captain: Frank O'Brien Jr.
- Home stadium: Yale Field

1947 Eastern Intercollegiate Baseball League baseball standings
	Conf.						Overall
Team	W		L		T	PCT	W		L		T	PCT
Yale ‍†‍‍^{y}	9	–	3	–	0	.750	19	–	10	–	1	.650
Columbia ‍‍‍	7	–	5	–	0	.583	8	–	7	–	1	.531
Harvard ‍‍‍	7	–	5	–	0	.583	12	–	13	–	0	.480
Princeton ‍‍‍	7	–	5	–	0	.583	10	–	12	–	0	.455
Penn ‍‍‍	6	–	6	–	0	.500	12	–	9	–	0	.571
Dartmouth ‍‍‍	3	–	9	–	0	.250	5	–	16	–	0	.238
Cornell ‍‍‍	3	–	9	–	0	.250	8	–	17	–	0	.320
† – Conference champion y – Invited to the NCAA Tournament

The 1947 Yale Bulldogs baseball team represented the Yale University in the 1947 NCAA baseball season. The Bulldogs played their home games at Yale Field. The team was coached by Ethan Allen in his 2nd season at Yale.

The Bulldogs advanced to the inaugural College World Series, falling to the California Golden Bears two games to none in the best of three series.

Future president George H. W. Bush was a first baseman on the team.

== Roster ==
1947 Yale Bulldogs roster
Pitchers: Frank Quinn; Robert M. Goodyear; Catchers: F. Bolton Elwell, Jr.; Richard Felske	Infielders: George Bush; Gordon D. Davis; Frank O'Brien, Jr.; James E. Osborn II; Richard G. Mathews, Jr.; Arthur K. Moher	Outfielders: Bill Howe; James W. Bracnaro; Frank T. Stanton, Jr.; Robert L. Rosensweig; George S. Sulliman	Position Unknown: C. K. Pearson

== Schedule ==
Legend
	Yale win
	Yale loss
	Tie
**Bold**	Yale team member
*	Non-Conference game

1947 Yale Bulldogs baseball game log
Regular season

March
Date	Opponent	Site/stadium	Score	Overall record	EIBL record
March 29	at Virginia*	Charlottesville, VA	**W** 6–4	1–0	
March 31	at Richmond*	Richmond, VA	**L** 7–8	1–1	

April
Date	Opponent	Site/stadium	Score	Overall record	EIBL record
April 1	at Georgetown*	Washington, D.C.	**W** 3–2	2–1	
April 10	Wesleyan*	Yale Field • New Haven, CT	**W** 11–0	3–1	
April 12	Fordham*	Yale Field • New Haven, CT	**W** 3–1	4–1	
April 14	New York Equitable Life*	Yale Field • New Haven, CT	**L** 0–3^{7}	4–2	
April 17	Trinity*	Yale Field • New Haven, CT	**W** 1–0	5–2	
April 19	Navy*	Yale Field • New Haven, CT	**L** 1–2	5–3	
April 23	at Amherst*	Amherst, MA	**W** 7–5	6–3	
April 26	Dartmouth	Yale Field • New Haven, CT	**W** 8–3	7–3	1–0
April 30	at Army*	Johnson Stadium • West Point, NY	**L** 3–4	7–4	

May
Date	Opponent	Site/stadium	Score	Overall record	EIBL record
May 3	Army*	Yale Field • New Haven, CT	**T** 3–3^{6}	7–4–1	
May 7	Columbia	Yale Field • New Haven, CT	**W** 15–3	8–4–1	2–0
May 10	at Dartmouth	Hanover, NH	**W** 8–3	9–4–1	3–0
May 16	Penn	Yale Field • New Haven, CT	**W** 1–0^{11}	10–4–1	4–0
May 17	at Columbia	New York, NY	**L** 3–4	10–5–1	4–1
May 23	Cornell	Yale Field • New Haven, CT	**W** 3–1^{7}	11–5–1	5–1
May 23	Cornell	Yale Field • New Haven, CT	**L** 1–2^{7}	11–6–1	5–2
May 24	at Penn	Bower Field • Philadelphia, PA	**W** 14–4	12–6–1	6–2
May 28	Brown*	Yale Field • New Haven, CT	**W** 5–1	13–6–1	
May 31	Yale Club of New York City*	Yale Field • New Haven, CT	**W** 8–1	14–6–1	

June
Date	Opponent	Site/stadium	Score	Overall record	EIBL record
June 4	at Harvard	Joseph J. O'Donnell Field • Boston, MA	**W** 9–3	15–6–1	7–2
June 11	Maryland*	Yale Field • New Haven, CT	**L** 2–3	15–7–1	
June 12	Princeton	Yale Field • New Haven, CT	**W** 7–3	16–7–1	8–2
June 14	at Princeton	Princeton, NJ	**L** 0–1	16–8–1	8–3
June 17	Harvard	Yale Field • New Haven, CT	**W** 1–0	17–8–1	9–3

Postseason

NCAA tournament: Eastern Playoff
Date	Opponent	Site/stadium	Score	Overall record	NCAAT record
June 20	Clemson	Yale Field • New Haven, CT	**W** 7-3	18-8–1	1–0
June 21	NYU	Yale Field • New Haven, CT	**W** 6-4	19-8–1	2–0

NCAA tournament: College World Series
Date	Opponent	Site/stadium	Score	Overall record	CWS record
June 27	vs. California	Hyames Field • Kalamazoo, MI	**L** 4–17	19–9–1	0–1
June 28	vs. California	Hyames Field • Kalamazoo, MI	**L** 7-8	19–10–1	0–2

== Awards and honors ==
Bill Howe

- All-America First team
