= 1947 California Golden Bears baseball team =

American college baseball season

1947 California Golden Bears baseball

National champions Pacific Coast Conference champions
- Conference: Pacific Coast Conference
- Record: 31–10 (11–4 PCC)
- Head coach: Clint Evans (18th year)
- Home stadium: Evans Diamond

1947 Pacific Coast Conference baseball standings
	Conf.				Overall
Team	W		L	PCT	W		L	PCT
North
Washington State ‍†‍‍	11	–	5	.688	23	–	11	.676
Oregon ‍‍‍	9	–	7	.563	19	–	7	.731
Washington ‍‍‍	9	–	7	.563	9	–	7	.563
Oregon State ‍‍‍	6	–	10	.375	14	–	11	.560
Idaho ‍‍‍	5	–	11	.313		–		–
California Intercollegiate Baseball Association
California ‍†‍‍^{y}	11	–	4	.733	31	–	10	.756
Southern California ‍†‍‍	11	–	4	.733	16	–	6	.727
Stanford ‍‍‍	7	–	8	.467	19	–	11	.633
UCLA ‍‍‍	7	–	8	.467	29	–	15	.659
St. Mary's ‍‍‍	5	–	10	.333		–		–
Santa Clara ‍‍‍	4	–	11	.267	10	–	15	.400
† – Conference champion y – Invited to the NCAA Tournament

The 1947 California Golden Bears baseball team represented the University of California in the 1947 NCAA baseball season. The Golden Bears played their home games at Evans Diamond. The team was coached by Clint Evans in his 18th season at California.

The Golden Bears won the inaugural College World Series, defeating the Yale Bulldogs two games to none in the best of three championship series.

== Roster ==
1947 California Golden Bears roster
Pitchers: Nino Barnise; Virgil Butler; Robert Anderson; Catchers: Doug Clayton	Infielders: Jim Brown; Tim Cronin; Ira Finney; Bob O'Dell; John Ramos; Ed Sanclemente; Glenn DuFour	Outfielders: John Fiscalini; Jackie Jensen; Ernest Mann; Cliff McClain; Lyle Palmer	Position Unknown: LaVerne Horton; Willard Lotter; Sam Rosenthal; George Yamor

== Schedule ==
Legend
	California win
	California loss
**Bold**	California team member
*	Non-Conference game

1947 California Golden Bears baseball game log
Post-season

NCAA tournament: Western Playoff
Date	Opponent	Site/stadium	Score	Overall record	NCAAT record
June 20	vs. Denver	Merchants Park • Denver, CO	**W** 3–1	28–10	1–0
June 21	vs. Texas	Merchants Park • Denver, CO	**W** 13–2	29–10	2–0

NCAA tournament: College World Series
Date	Opponent	Site/stadium	Score	Overall record	CWS record
June 27	vs. Yale	Hyames Field • Kalamazoo, MI	**W** 17–4	30–10	1–0
June 28	vs. Yale	Hyames Field • Kalamazoo, MI	**W** 8–7	31–10	2–0

== Awards and honors ==
Nino Barnise

- All-America First Team
- All-District 8 First Team

John Fiscalini

- All-America First Team
- All-District 8 First Team

Jackie Jensen

- All-America First Team
- All-District 8 First Team
