= 1947 Texas Longhorns baseball team =

American college baseball season

1947 Texas Longhorns baseball

SWC champions

NCAA Western playoff
- Conference: Southwest Conference
- Record: 22–4 (12–3 SWC)
- Head coach: Bibb Falk (5th year)
- Home stadium: Clark Field

1947 Southwest Conference baseball standings
	Conf.				Overall
Team	W		L	PCT	W		L	PCT
Texas ‍†‍‍^{y}	14	–	1	.933	20	–	4	.833
Baylor ‍‍‍	9	–	5	.643	12	–	8	.600
Texas A&M ‍‍‍	8	–	6	.571	14	–	8	.636
SMU ‍‍‍	5	–	9	.357	6	–	9	.400
Rice ‍‍‍	4	–	10	.286	5	–	11	.313
TCU ‍‍‍	3	–	12	.200	4	–	15	.211
† – Conference champion y – Invited to the NCAA tournament As of June 30, 1947; Rankings from Collegiate Baseball

The 1947 Texas Longhorns baseball team represented the University of Texas in the 1947 NCAA baseball season. The Longhorns played their home games at Clark Field. The team was coached by Bibb Falk in his 5th season at Texas.

The Longhorns were invited to the inaugural NCAA baseball tournament, falling in the final of the Western playoff to eventual College World Series champion California.

== Roster ==
1947 Texas Longhorns roster
Pitchers: Bobby Layne; Murray Wall; Jim Godfrey; Catchers: John Watson; Allen Winters	Infielders: Tom Hamilton; Randy Jackson; Sidney Zomlefer; William Jessie Cox; Joe Mullins Randerson; Outfielders: Hobbs Williams; Robert Ferguson; Jim Shamblin; Manager: John P. Lucas	Unknown: Walter P. Headrick; Charles E. Munson; Charles W. Tankersley; Lloyd Rex Travis; John Daniel Watson; Ellis Joe Wheless; Rainbolt; Karger

== Schedule ==
Legend
19	Texas win
3	Texas loss
*	Non-Conference game

1947 Texas Longhorns baseball game log
Regular season

March
Date	Opponent	Site/stadium	Score	Overall record	SWC record
Mar 13	Hardin–Simmons*	Clark Field • Austin, TX	W 28–9	1–0	
Mar 21	Brooke Army Medical Center*	Clark Field • Austin, TX	W 10–3	2–0	
Mar 22	at Brooke Army Medical Center*	Fort Sam Houston • San Antonio, TX	L 3–5	2–1	
Mar 24	McMurry*	Clark Field • Austin, TX	W 9–5	3–1	
Mar 27	SMU	Clark Field • Austin, TX	W 12–7	4–1	1–0
Mar 28	SMU	Clark Field • Austin, TX	W 19–5	5–1	2–0

March 13, 1947 vs. Hardin-Simmons University at Clark Field - Win 28-0

March 21, 1947 vs. Brooke Medical Center at Clark Field - Win 10-3

March 22, 1947 vs. Brooke Medical Center at Christy Mathewson Field (San Antonio) - Loss 3-5

March 24, 1947 vs. McMurry University at Clark Field - Win 9-5

March 24, 1947 vs. Southern Methodist University at Clark Field - Win 12-7

March 28, 1947 vs. Southern Methodist University at Clark Field - Win 19-5

April
Date	Opponent	Site/stadium	Score	Overall record	SWC record
Apr 1	at Beaumont Exporters*	Stuart Stadium • Beaumont, TX	L 7–13	5–2	
Apr 2	at Rice	Houston, TX	W 10–2	6–2	3–0
Apr 4	Oklahoma*	Clark Field • Austin, TX	W 8–7	7–2	
Apr 5	Oklahoma*	Clark Field • Austin, TX	W 9–5	8–2	
Apr 11	Texas A&M	Clark Field • Austin, TX	W 9–8	9–2	4–0
Apr 17	at Baylor	Waco, TX	W 9–6	10–2	5–0
Apr 18	at Baylor	Waco, TX	L 2–6	10–3	5–1
Apr 22	Baylor	Clark Field • Austin, TX	W 1–0	11–3	6–1
Apr 25	at TCU	Fort Worth, TX	W 4–3	12–3	7–1
Apr 26	at TCU	Fort Worth, TX	W 12–1	13–3	8–1
Apr 28	at SMU	Dallas, TX	W 4–1	14–3	9–1

April 1, 1947 vs. Beaumont Exporters at Stewart Field (Beaumont) - Loss 13-7

April 2, 1947 vs. Rice University at Buff Stadium (Houston) - Win 10-2

April 4. 1947 vs. Oklahoma University at Clark Field - Win 8-7

April 5, 1947 vs. Oklahoma University at Clark Field - Win 9-5

April 11, 1947 vs. Texas A&M University at Clark Field - Win 9-8

April 17, 1947 vs. Baylor University at Katy Park (Waco) - Win 9-6

April 18, 1947 vs. Baylor University at Katy Park (Waco) - Loss 2-6

April 22, 1947 vs. Baylor University at Clark Field - Win 1-0

April 25, 1947 vs. Texas Christian University at TCU (Ft. Worth) - Win 4-3

April 26, 1947 vs. Texas Christian University at TCU (Ft. Worth) - Win 12-1

April 28, 1947 vs. Southern Methodist University at Rebel Stadium (Dallas) - Win 4-1

May
Date	Opponent	Site/stadium	Score	Overall record	SWC record
May 1	Rice	Clark Field • Austin, TX	W 8–6	15–3	10–1
May 2	Rice	Clark Field • Austin, TX	W 12–4	16–3	11–1
May 6	TCU	Clark Field • Austin, TX	W 15–5	17–3	12–1
May 14	at Texas A&M	Kyle Baseball Field • College Station, TX	W 6–5	18–3	13–1
May 15	at Texas A&M	Kyle Baseball Field • College Station, TX	W 11–9	19–3	14–1

May 1, 1947 vs. Rice University at Clark Field - Win 8-6

May 2, 1947 vs. Rice University at Clark Field - Win 12-5

May 6, 1947 vs. Texas Christian University at Clark Field - Win 15-5

May 14, 1947 vs. Texas A&M University at Kyle Field (College Station) - Win 6-5

May 15, 1947 vs. Texas A&M University at Kyle Field (College Station) Win 11-9

Postseason

NCAA Western playoff
Date	Opponent	Site/stadium	Score	Overall record	Regional Record
June 20	Oklahoma	Merchants Park • Denver, CO	W 10–9	20–3	1–0
June 21	California	Merchants Park • Denver, CO	L 7–8	20–4	1–1
