= Randy Hinson =

American football and baseball coach

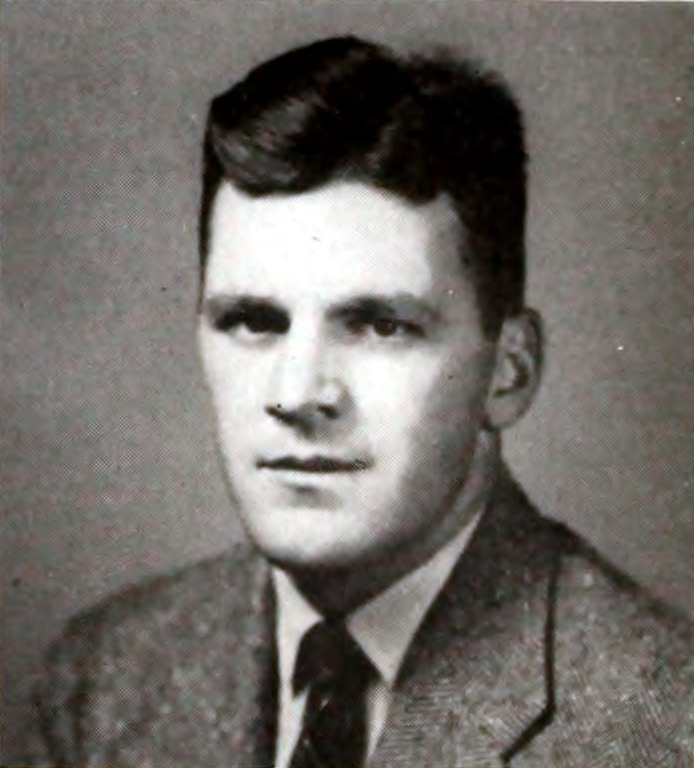
- Hinson in 1940

Biographical details
- Born: July 23, 1912; Kershaw, South Carolina, U.S.
- Died: May 24, 2006 (aged 93); Fairfax County, Virginia, U.S.

Playing career

Football, baseball
- 1933–1936: Clemson
- Position: Halfback (football)

Coaching career (HC unless noted)

Baseball
- 1939–40, 1946–47: Clemson

Football
- 1944–1947: Clemson (assistant)

Head coaching record
- Overall: 58–19–2

Accomplishments and honors

Championships
- SoCon: 1947; 1947 Eastern playoff: Semifinals

Awards
- SoCon Coach of the Year (1947); Second-team All-SoCon (1934)
- Military career
- Allegiance: United States
- Branch: United States Army
- Service years: 1941–1964
- Rank: Lieutenant Colonel
- Units: 755th Tank Battalion; 82nd Airborne Division
- Conflicts: World War II; Korean War

Claude Randolph Hinson Sr (July 23, 1912 – May 24, 2006) was a United States Army colonel and college football and baseball coach.

Born in Kershaw, South Carolina, in 1912, Hinson attended Clemson College, where he played football and baseball. He graduated from Clemson with a degree in agricultural economics in 1936. In 1939 and 1940, he returned to Clemson to coach the baseball team and the freshman football team, before being drafted by the United States Army in 1941. During World War II, he served as an adviser to the French expeditionary force in North Africa and in Italy with the 755th Tank Battalion.

After the war, he returned to Clemson as a baseball and football coach. In 1947, the baseball team won the Southern Conference championship and qualified for the inaugural NCAA baseball tournament. Hinson was named SoCon baseball coach of the year.

Hinson then returned to the Army, serving in the Korean War, working with the International Military Sports Council in Germany, and was infantry representative to the U.S. Army Engineer School, retiring in 1964. Hinson taught the U.S. government and coached golf at Fort Hunt High School in Alexandria, Virginia, until 1979.

== Death ==
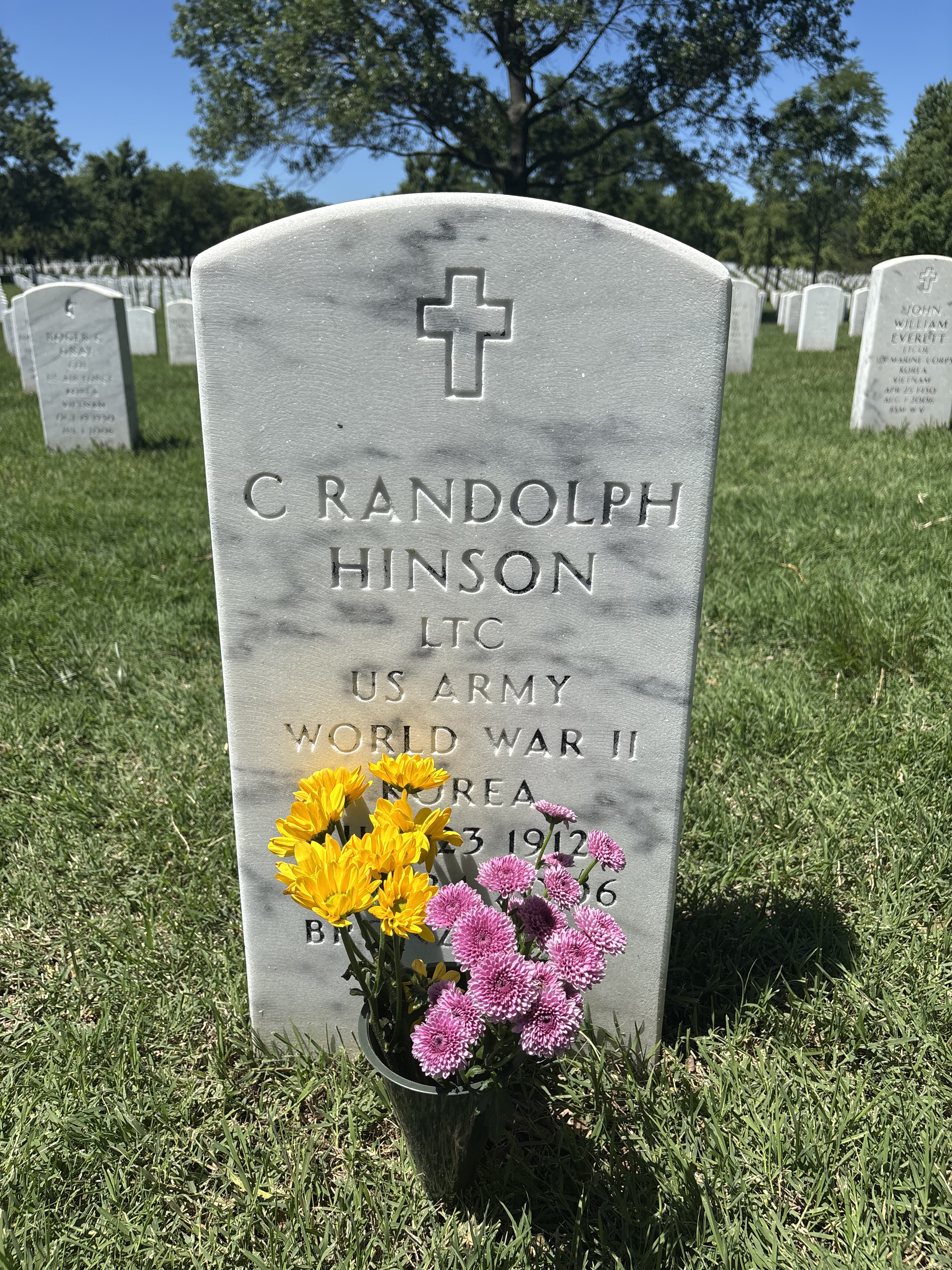
Hinson's gravesite in May 2026

On May 24, 2006, Hinson passed away at Inova Hospital Mount Vernon, located in Fairfax County, due to congestive heart failure and recurrent pneumonia. Hinson is buried at Arlington National Cemetery.

== Head coaching record ==
Record table
| Season | Team | Overall | Conference | Standing | Postseason |
|---|---|---|---|---|---|
Clemson Tigers (Independent/Southern Conference) (1939–40, 1946–47)
| 1939 | Clemson | 10–7 | | | |
| 1940 | Clemson | 12–2–2 | | | |
| 1946 | Clemson | 12–5 | | | |
| 1947 | Clemson | 24–5 | 13–2 | 1st | NCAA Eastern Playoff |
| Total: | | 58–19–2 (.747) | | | |

== Honors ==
Player

- Second–team All-Southern Conference football team: 1934

Coach

- SoCon: 1947
- SoCon Coach of the Year: 1947
- 1947 Eastern playoff: Semifinals (Note: Only 4 teams played in each region.)
