= California Golden Bears baseball =

College baseball team representing the University of California, Berkeley

- 2026 California Golden Bears baseball team
- Founded: 1892; 134 years ago
- University: University of California, Berkeley
- Head coach: Mike Neu (9th season)
- Conference: ACC
- Location: Berkeley, CA
- Home stadium: Evans Diamond (capacity: 2,500)
- Nickname: Golden Bears
- Colors: Blue and gold

College World Series champions
- 1947, 1957

College World Series appearances
- 1947, 1957, 1980, 1988, 1992, 2011

NCAA regional champions
- 1980, 1988, 1992, 2011

NCAA tournament appearances
- 1947, 1957, 1980, 1985, 1988, 1991, 1992, 1995, 2001, 2008, 2010, 2011, 2015, 2019

Conference regular season champions
- 1929, 1933, 1934, 1935, 1937, 1938, 1941, 1945, 1947, 1957, 1960, 1965, 1980

The California Golden Bears baseball team represents the University of California, Berkeley in NCAA Division I college baseball. Along with most other California athletic teams, the baseball team participates in the Atlantic Coast Conference. The Bears play their home games at Evans Diamond.

== History ==
The Bears have appeared in the NCAA Division I baseball tournament 13 times, and in the College World Series 6 times. They have won two National Championships: at the first College World Series in 1947 and again in 1957. In 1964, future major leaguer Mike Epstein batted .384 for the team and was named an All-American.

In 2010, the university announced that baseball would be one of five sports cut as a cost-cutting measure. However, in April 2011, after receiving more than $9 million in pledges from supporters of the program, the program was reinstated. Even donors from Stanford University, California's biggest rival, pitched in to help save the Golden Bears baseball team. The Bears would then make the NCAA tournament as a 3-seed and go on a Cinderella run to the College World Series before falling to #1 overall seed Virginia to finish the season ranked 8th in the nation.

== California in the NCAA Tournament ==
Year	Record	Pct	Notes
1947	4-0	1.000	College World Series Champion, Western Playoff
1957	7-1	.875	College World Series Champion, District 8
1980	8-3	.727	College World Series 3rd Place, Midwest Regional
1985	0-2	.000	West II Regional
1988	4-2	.667	College World Series 7th Place, Central Regional
1991	3-2	.600	Midwest Regional
1992	4-3	.571	College World Series 7th Place, East Regional
1995	1-2	.333	Mideast Regional
2001	1-2	.333	Baton Rouge Regional
2008	0-2	.000	Long Beach Regional
2010	0-2	.000	Norman Regional
2011	7-3	.700	College World Series 5th Place, hosted Santa Clara Super Regional
2015	2-2	.500	College Station Regional
2019	0-2	.000	Fayetteville Regional
TOTALS	41–28	.594	

== Coaches ==
Head coach	Years	Win–loss	Pct.
No Coach	1882–1886, 1901–1906	11–14	.440
Cohen	1887	2–1	.667
Cochran, Smith	1898	1–2	.333
Joseph Corbett	1899	2–0	1.000
George Van Haltern	1900	2–1	.667
Bob McCarthey	1907–1908	10–11	.476
W. Z. Zeb Smith	1909–1910	3–3	.500
Jimmie Schaeffer	1911–1915	39–21–2	.645
Carl Zamloch	1916–1917, 1919–1929	146–93–7	.608
Clair Goodwin	1918	4–1	.800
Clint Evans	1930–1954	547–256	.681
George Wolfman	1955–1973	484–335	.591
Jackie Jensen	1974–1977	109–95	.534
Bob Milano	1978–1999	688–644–4	.516
David Esquer	2000–2017	525–467–2	.529
Mike Neu	2018–present	185–152	.549

== Year-by-year results ==
National champions	College World Series berth	NCAA Tournament berth	Conference Tournament Champions	Conference/Division Regular Season Champions

Season	Head coach	Conference	Season results									Tournament results		Final poll (Note: Collegiate Baseball began team rankings in 1959. Baseball America began during the 1981 season.)		
Season	Head coach	Conference	Overall				Conference					Conference	Postseason	BA	CB	Coaches
Season	Head coach	Conference	Wins	Losses	Ties	%	Wins	Losses	Ties	%	Finish	Conference	Postseason	BA	CB	Coaches
California Golden Bears
1892	No coach	Independent	0	2	0	.000	—	—	—	—	—	—	—	—	—	—
1893	No coach	Independent	0	3	0	.000	—	—	—	—	—	—	—	—	—	—
1894	No coach	Independent	0	2	0	.000	—	—	—	—	—	—	—	—	—	—
1895	No coach	Independent	0	2	0	.000	—	—	—	—	—	—	—	—	—	—
1896	No coach	Independent	0	2	0	.000	—	—	—	—	—	—	—	—	—	—
1897	Cohen	Independent	2	1	0	.667	—	—	—	—	—	—	—	—	—	—
1898	Cochran, Smith	Independent	1	2	0	.333	—	—	—	—	—	—	—	—	—	—
1899	Joseph Corbett	Independent	2	0	0	1.000	—	—	—	—	—	—	—	—	—	—
1900	George Van Haltren	Independent	2	1	0	.667	—	—	—	—	—	—	—	—	—	—
1901	No coach	Independent	2	1	0	.667	—	—	—	—	—	—	—	—	—	—
1902	No coach	Independent	2	0	0	1.000	—	—	—	—	—	—	—	—	—	—
1903	No coach	Independent	2	0	0	1.000	—	—	—	—	—	—	—	—	—	—
1904	No coach	Independent	2	1	0	.667	—	—	—	—	—	—	—	—	—	—
1905	No coach	Independent	2	0	0	1.000	—	—	—	—	—	—	—	—	—	—
1906	No coach	Independent	1	1	0	.500	—	—	—	—	—	—	—	—	—	—
1907	Bob McCarthey	Independent	1	2	0	.333	—	—	—	—	—	—	—	—	—	—
1908	Bob McCarthey	Independent	9	9	0	.500	—	—	—	—	—	—	—	—	—	—
1909	W. Z. Zeb Smith	Independent	2	1	0	.667	—	—	—	—	—	—	—	—	—	—
1910	W. Z. Zeb Smith	Independent	1	2	0	.333	—	—	—	—	—	—	—	—	—	—
1911	Jimmie Schaeffer	Independent	7	3	1	.682	—	—	—	—	—	—	—	—	—	—
1912	Jimmie Schaeffer	Independent	16	10	0	.615	—	—	—	—	—	—	—	—	—	—
1913	Jimmie Schaeffer	Independent	0	2	0	.000	—	—	—	—	—	—	—	—	—	—
1914	Jimmie Schaeffer	Independent	4	2	1	.643	—	—	—	—	—	—	—	—	—	—
1915	Jimmie Schaeffer	Independent	12	4	0	.750	—	—	—	—	—	—	—	—	—	—
1916	Carl Zamloch	Pacific Coast Conference	11	11	2	.500	3	0	0	1.000	1st	—	—	—	—	—
1917	Carl Zamloch	Pacific Coast Conference	12	8	1	.595	3	0	0	1.000	1st	—	—	—	—	—
1918	Clair Goodwin	Pacific Coast Conference	4	1	0	.800	2	1	0	.667	2nd	—	—	—	—	—
1919	Carl Zamloch	Pacific Coast Conference	7	5	0	.583	0	2	0	.000	6th	—	—	—	—	—
1920	Carl Zamloch	Pacific Coast Conference	22	10	1	.682	5	1	0	.833	1st	—	—	—	—	—
1921	Carl Zamloch	Pacific Coast Conference	10	8	1	.553	3	0	0	1.000	1st	—	—	—	—	—
1922	Carl Zamloch	Pacific Coast Conference	12	6	1	.658	2	1	0	.667	2nd	—	—	—	—	—
1923	Carl Zamloch	Pacific Coast Conference	12	7	1	.625	3	0	0	1.000	1st	—	—	—	—	—
1924	Carl Zamloch	Pacific Coast Conference	13	11	0	.542	3	3	0	.500	T–1st	—	—	—	—	—
1925	Carl Zamloch	Pacific Coast Conference	11	2	0	.846	1	2	0	.333	2nd	—	—	—	—	—
1926	Carl Zamloch	Pacific Coast Conference	8	6	0	.571	4	2	0	.667	1st	—	—	—	—	—
1927	Carl Zamloch	CIBA	4	9	0	.308	4	8	0	.333	5th	—	—	—	—	—
1928	Carl Zamloch	CIBA	8	4	0	.667	8	4	0	.667	2nd	—	—	—	—	—
1929	Carl Zamloch	CIBA	16	7	0	.696	11	3	0	.786	1st	—	—	—	—	—
1930	Clint Evans	CIBA	12	3	0	.800	12	3	0	.800	2nd	—	—	—	—	—
1931	Clint Evans	CIBA	15	7	0	.682	13	5	0	.722	3rd	—	—	—	—	—
1932	Clint Evans	CIBA	16	6	0	.727	12	6	0	.667	2nd	—	—	—	—	—
1933	Clint Evans	CIBA	19	9	0	.679	9	2	0	.818	1st	—	—	—	—	—
1934	Clint Evans	CIBA	25	6	0	.806	14	1	0	.933	1st	—	—	—	—	—
1935	Clint Evans	CIBA	20	9	0	.690	10	5	0	.667	T–1st	—	—	—	—	—
1936	Clint Evans	CIBA	18	13	0	.581	6	9	0	.400	4th	—	—	—	—	—
1937	Clint Evans	CIBA	20	7	0	.741	11	4	0	.733	1st	—	—	—	—	—
1938	Clint Evans	CIBA	39	8	0	.830	12	3	0	.800	1st	—	—	—	—	—
1939	Clint Evans	CIBA	24	9	0	.727	9	6	0	.600	3rd	—	—	—	—	—
1940	Clint Evans	CIBA	22	10	0	.688	9	6	0	.600	3rd	—	—	—	—	—
1941	Clint Evans	CIBA	37	11	0	.771	11	4	0	.733	T–1st	—	—	—	—	—
1942	Clint Evans	CIBA	22	5	0	.815	11	4	0	.733	2nd	—	—	—	—	—
1943	Clint Evans	CIBA	23	9	0	.719	14	1	0	.933	1st	—	—	—	—	—
1944	Clint Evans	CIBA	9	14	0	.391	3	5	0	.375	3rd	—	—	—	—	—
1945	Clint Evans	CIBA	12	9	0	.571	7	1	0	.875	T–1st	—	—	—	—	—
1946	Clint Evans	CIBA	24	9	0	.727	8	4	0	.667	2nd	—	—	—	—	—
1947	Clint Evans	CIBA	31	10	0	.756	11	4	0	.733	T–1st	—	NCAA Tournament champions	—	—	—
1948	Clint Evans	CIBA	20	14	0	.588	8	3	0	.727	3rd	—	—	—	—	—
1949	Clint Evans	CIBA	31	17	0	.646	5	10	0	.333	5th	—	—	—	—	—
1950	Clint Evans	CIBA	24	13	0	.649	8	6	0	.571	2nd	—	—	—	—	—
1951	Clint Evans	CIBA	22	16	0	.579	6	10	0	.375	4th	—	—	—	—	—
1952	Clint Evans	CIBA	21	16	0	.568	5	11	0	.313	5th	—	—	—	—	—
1953	Clint Evans	CIBA	22	15	0	.595	8	8	0	.500	3rd	—	—	—	—	—
1954	Clint Evans	CIBA	19	11	0	.633	7	9	0	.438	T–3rd	—	—	—	—	—
1955	George Wolfman	CIBA	17	16	0	.515	7	9	0	.438	4th	—	—	—	—	—
1956	George Wolfman	CIBA	25	9	0	.735	9	7	0	.563	2nd	—	—	—	—	—
1957	George Wolfman	CIBA	35	10	0	.778	12	4	0	.750	1st	—	NCAA Tournament champions	—	—	—
1958	George Wolfman	CIBA	19	12	0	.613	9	7	0	.563	2nd	—	—	—	—	—
1959	George Wolfman	CIBA	22	13	0	.629	9	7	0	.563	T–2nd	—	—	—	—	—
1960	George Wolfman	CIBA	30	14	0	.682	12	4	0	.750	T–1st	—	—	—	16	—
1961	George Wolfman	CIBA	29	10	0	.744	11	5	0	.688	2nd	—	–	—	14	—
1962	George Wolfman	CIBA	24	20	0	.545	7	9	0	.438	3rd	—	—	—	—	—
1963	George Wolfman	CIBA	19	21	0	.475	4	12	0	.250	5th	—	—	—	—	—
1964	George Wolfman	CIBA	25	17	0	.595	5	15	0	.250	5th	—	—	—	—	—
1965	George Wolfman	CIBA	29	14	0	.674	12	8	0	.600	T–1st	—	—	—	14	—
1966	George Wolfman	CIBA	32	14	0	.696	11	9	0	.550	T–2nd	—	—	—	—	—
1967	George Wolfman	AAWU	17	27	0	.386	3	13	0	.188	7th	—	—	—	—	—
1968	George Wolfman	Pac-8	24	24	0	.500	7	12	0	.368	6th	—	—	—	—	—
1969	George Wolfman	Pac-8	31	19	0	.620	12	9	0	.571	4th	—	—	—	29	—
1970	George Wolfman	Pac-8	28	19	0	.596	9	8	0	.684	4th	—	—	—	—	—
1971	George Wolfman	Pac-8	24	24	0	.500	5	12	0	.294	7th	—	—	—	—	—
1972	George Wolfman	Pac-8	33	21	0	.611	9	9	0	.500	T–2nd	—	—	—	—	—
1973	George Wolfman	Pac-8	21	31	0	.404	6	12	0	.333	4th	—	—	—	—	—
1974	Jackie Jensen	Pac-8	25	24	0	.510	8	10	0	.444	3rd	—	—	—	—	—
1975	Jackie Jensen	Pac-8	22	24	0	.478	7	9	0	.438	4th	—	—	—	—	—
1976	Jackie Jensen	Pac-8	33	20	0	.623	9	14	0	.391	4th	—	—	—	—	—
1977	Jackie Jensen	Pac-8	29	27	0	.518	5	13	0	.278	T–3rd	—	—	—	—	—
1978	Bob Milano	Pac-8	35	27	0	.565	6	12	0	.333	T–3rd	—	—	—	—	—
1979	Bob Milano	Pac-10	31	25	1	.553	16	14	0	.533	3rd	—	—	—	—	—
1980	Bob Milano	Pac-10	44	23	1	.654	17	13	0	.567	T–1st	—	3rd	—	3	—
1981	Bob Milano	Pac-10	31	31	1	.500	12	18	0	.400	5th	—	—	—	—	—
1982	Bob Milano	Pac-10	29	32	0	.475	9	17	0	.346	5th	—	—	—	—	—
1983	Bob Milano	Pac-10	23	37	0	.383	9	20	0	.310	6th	—	—	—	—	—
1984	Bob Milano	Pac-10	39	28	1	.581	12	18	0	.400	4th	—	—	—	—	—
1985	Bob Milano	Pac-10	42	24	0	.636	17	13	0	.567	T–2nd	—	West II Regional	18	28	—
1986	Bob Milano	Pac-10	32	25	0	.561	10	20	0	.333	6th	—	—	—	—	—
1987	Bob Milano	Pac-10	36	25	0	.590	12	18	0	.400	T–5th	—	—	—	—	—
1988	Bob Milano	Pac-10	40	25	0	.615	16	14	0	.533	T–3rd	—	T–7th	9	8	—
1989	Bob Milano	Pac-10	35	24	0	.593	10	20	0	.333	T–5th	—	—	—	—	—
1990	Bob Milano	Pac-10	18	43	0	.295	3	27	0	.100	6th	—	—	—	—	—
1991	Bob Milano	Pac-10	37	27	0	.578	14	16	0	.467	3rd	—	Midwest Regional	23	20	—
1992	Bob Milano	Pac-10	35	28	0	.556	14	16	0	.467	T–3rd	—	T–7th	14	8	—
1993	Bob Milano	Pac-10	27	30	0	.474	13	17	0	.433	5th	—	—	—	—	—
1994	Bob Milano	Pac-10	25	35	0	.417	12	18	0	.400	4th	—	—	—	—	—
1995	Bob Milano	Pac-10	32	25	0	.561	18	12	0	.600	3rd	—	Mideast Regional	—	29	—
1996	Bob Milano	Pac-10	27	29	0	.482	10	20	0	.333	5th	—	—	—	—	—
1997	Bob Milano	Pac-10	21	38	0	.356	4	26	0	.133	6th	—	—	—	—	—
1998	Bob Milano	Pac-10	22	32	0	.407	5	24	0	.172	6th	—	—	—	—	—
1999	Bob Milano	Pac-10	27	31	0	.466	11	13	0	.458	7th	—	—	—	—	—
2000	David Esquer	Pac-10	25	28	0	.472	11	13	0	.458	5th	—	—	—	—	—
2001	David Esquer	Pac-10	34	25	0	.576	14	10	0	.583	T–3rd	—	Baton Rouge Regional	—	—	—
2002	David Esquer	Pac-10	29	27	0	.518	11	13	0	.458	5th	—	—	—	—	—
2003	David Esquer	Pac-10	28	27	0	.509	10	14	0	.417	7th	—	—	—	—	—
2004	David Esquer	Pac-10	25	31	0	.446	9	15	0	.375	T–8th	—	—	—	—	—
2005	David Esquer	Pac-10	34	23	0	.596	13	11	0	.542	5th	—	—	—	—	—
2006	David Esquer	Pac-10	26	28	0	.481	9	15	0	.375	9th	—	—	—	—	—
2007	David Esquer	Pac-10	29	26	0	.527	12	12	0	.500	4th	—	—	—	—	—
2008	David Esquer	Pac-10	33	21	2	.607	12	12	0	.500	T–4th	—	Long Beach Regional	—	23	—
2009	David Esquer	Pac-10	24	29	0	.453	9	18	0	.333	9th	—	—	—	—	—
2010	David Esquer	Pac-10	29	25	0	.537	13	14	0	.481	T–5th	—	Norman Regional	—	—	—
2011	David Esquer	Pac-10	38	23	0	.623	13	13	0	.500	6th	—	T–5th	11	6	8
2012	David Esquer	Pac-12	29	25	0	.537	12	18	0	.400	T–8th	—	—	—	—	—
2013	David Esquer	Pac-12	23	31	0	.426	10	20	0	.333	T–8th	—	—	—	—	—
2014	David Esquer	Pac-12	26	27	0	.491	13	17	0	.433	8th	—	—	—	—	—
2015	David Esquer	Pac-12	36	21	0	.632	18	12	0	.600	T–3rd	—	College Station Regional	—	23	—
2016	David Esquer	Pac-12	32	21	0	.604	14	16	0	.467	T–8th	—	—	—	—	—
2017	David Esquer	Pac-12	25	29	0	.463	15	15	0	.500	T–5th	—	—	—	—	—
2018	Mike Neu	Pac-12	32	22	0	.593	16	14	0	.533	5th	—	—	—	—	—
2019	Mike Neu	Pac-12	32	20	0	.615	17	11	0	.607	4th	—	Fayetteville Regional	—	—	—
2020	Mike Neu	Pac-12	5	11	0	.313	0	0	0	–	Cancelled	—	Cancelled	—	—	—
2021	Mike Neu	Pac-12	29	26	0	.527	15	15	0	.500	7th	—	—	—	—	—
2022	Mike Neu	Pac-12	29	27	0	.518	14	16	0	.467	7th	T–5th	—	—	—	—
2023	Mike Neu	Pac-12	24	28	0	.462	12	18	0	.400	T–8th	9th	—	—	—	—
2024	Mike Neu	Pac-12	36	19	0	.655	17	13	0	.567	6th	3rd	—	—	—	—
2025	Mike Neu	ACC	24	31	0	.436	9	21	0	.300	16th	Quarterfinals	—	—	—	—
2026	Mike Neu	ACC	29	26	0	.527	12	18	0	.400	13th	First Round				
Total			2,813	2,154	15	.566										

=== Notes ===
Source:

== Former Bears in Major League Baseball ==
Some notable Bears who have played in the Major Leagues include:

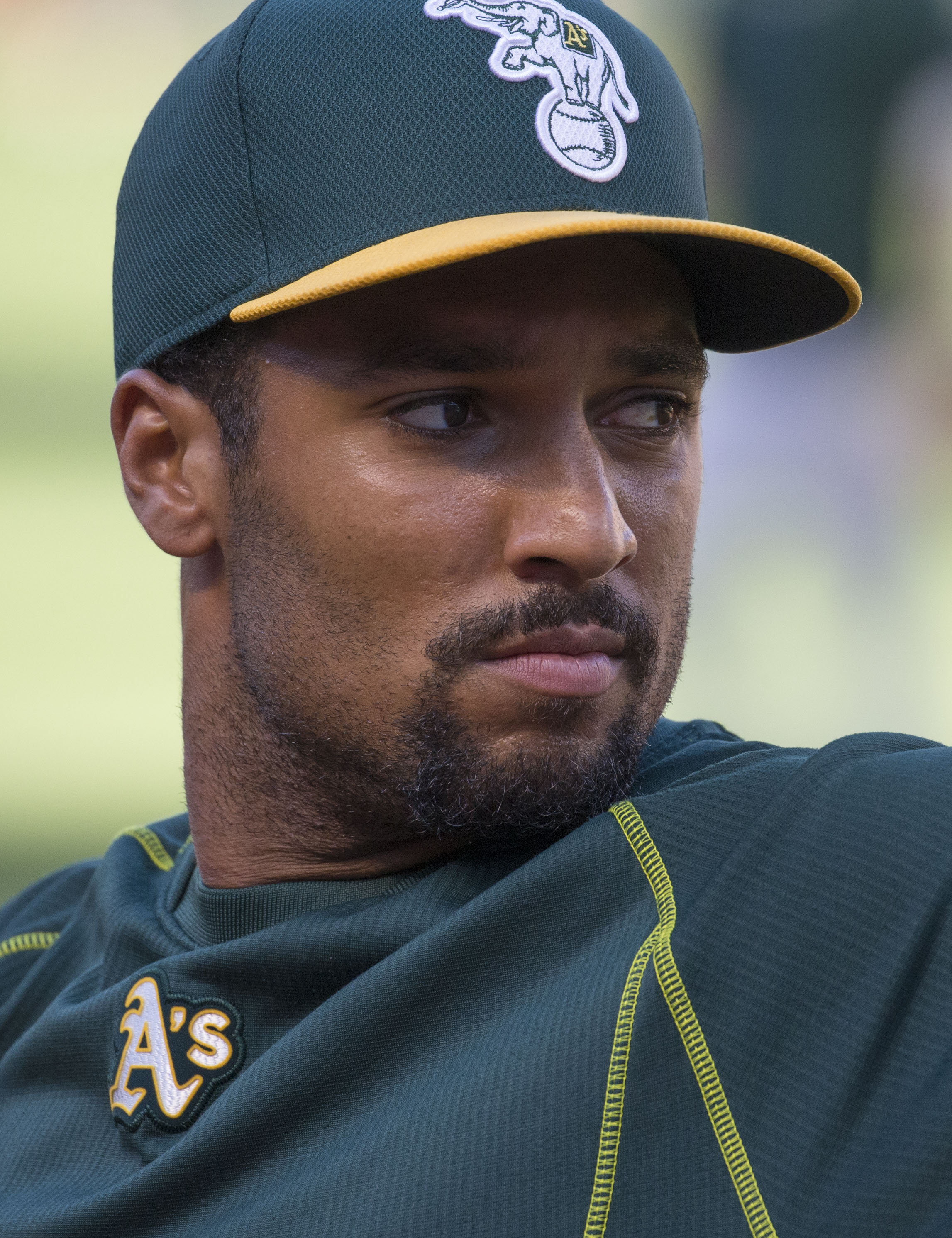
Marcus Semien

- John Baker, catcher
- Brennan Boesch, outfielder
- Lance Blankenship, former Oakland A’s utility player
- Geoff Blum, infielder
- Rod Booker, utility player
- Mark Canha, outfielder, Milwaukee Brewers
- Chuck Cary, pitcher
- Sam Chapman, center fielder
- Allen Craig, former first baseman, St. Louis Cardinals
- Taylor Douthit
- Mike Epstein (Super Jew)
- Jerry Goff, father of ex-Cal bear and current Detroit Lions quarterback Jared Goff
- Brett Jackson, center fielder
- Conor Jackson, former outfielder
- Jackie Jensen, right fielder
- Andrew Knapp, catcher, San Francisco Giants
- Jeff Kent, former San Francisco Giants second baseman
- Darren Lewis, center fielder
- Kevin Maas
- Bob Melvin, catcher and former manager of the San Francisco Giants
- Andy Messersmith
- Brandon Morrow, pitcher
- Xavier Nady
- Orval Overall
- Earl Robinson
- Tyson Ross, former starting pitcher
- Josh Satin, corner infielder
- Marcus Semien- infielder, New York Mets
- Andrew Vaughn, first baseman and outfielder, Milwaukee Brewers
- Tyler Walker, pitcher

== See also ==
- List of NCAA Division I baseball programs
