= Jack Alexander =

American baseball and football player

Biographical details
- Born: August 15, 1914; Haywood County, North Carolina, U.S.
- Died: February 13, 1984 (aged 69); Brevard, North Carolina, U.S.

Playing career

Football
- 1933–1935: Duke

Baseball
- 1936: Norfolk Tars
- 1936–1940: Akron Yankees
- 1940: Binghamton Triplets
- 1940: Amsterdam Rugmakers
- 1949: Bradford Blue Wings

Coaching career (HC unless noted)

Football
- 1940: Brevard
- 1948: Brevard

Accomplishments and honors

Awards
- Second-team All-SoCon (1934)

Jack Alexander (August 15, 1914 – February 13, 1984) was an American minor league baseball player, football player, and football coach.

Alexander played collegiate football at Duke University in Durham, North Carolina from 1933 to 1935.
