= Norwood Sothoron =

American soldier and athlete (1911–2005)

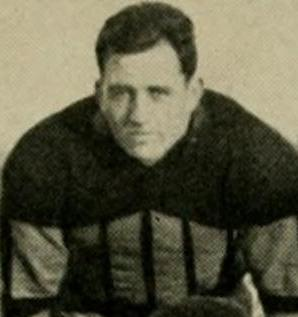
- Sothoron on the Maryland football team in 1934

Profile
- Positions: Quarterback, fullback (football); Defenseman (lacrosse); Guard-forward (basketball); Infielder (baseball)

Personal information
- Born: September 9, 1911; Charlotte Hall, Maryland, U.S.
- Died: February 4, 2005 (aged 93); Charlotte Hall, Maryland, U.S.
- Listed height: 5 ft 10.5 in (1.79 m)
- Listed weight: 158 lb (72 kg)

Career information
- High school: Charlotte Hall Military Academy
- College: Maryland

Awards and highlights
- Football: First-team All-SoCon (1934); Lacrosse: 1933 first-team All-American; 1934 first-team All-American; National Lacrosse Hall of Fame inductee

Other information
- Military career
- Branch: United States Army
- Service years: 1941–1946 (active duty)
- Rank: Colonel

Norwood Spencer Sothoron (September 9, 1911 – February 4, 2005) was an American soldier and athlete. He attended the University of Maryland, where he earned All-American honors twice in lacrosse and an honorable mention in football. Sothoron was inducted into the National Lacrosse Hall of Fame in 1972.

== Early life and college ==
He was born on September 9, 1911, in Charlotte Hall, Maryland, to parents Richard Horatio and Lillian Harrison Sothoron. Norwood Sothoron attended the Charlotte Hall Military Academy.

In 1931, he enrolled at the University of Maryland. While there, he earned varsity letters as a member of the baseball, basketball, football, and lacrosse teams. His senior year in 1934, he received the Senior Award as the most outstanding athlete in the class.

As a football player, in 1934, Sothoron was also named an honorable mention All-American and All-Southern Conference back. He also was named to every All-State and All-District of Columbia team published. In lacrosse, he was named a first-team All-American defenseman in both 1934 and 1935.

He was elected the senior class president, junior class vice president, and president of Kappa Alpha Order. Sothoron was a member of Omicron Delta Kappa and the Scabbard and Blade. Upon graduation in 1935, he received a commission as an officer in the United States Army through the Reserve Officer Training Corps (ROTC).

== Military and civilian career ==
Sothoron spent five years on active duty, from 1941 to 1946. During the Second World War, he served in the 110th Anti-Aircraft Artillery Group in the South Pacific Theater. After the war, he was assigned to a reserve officers school at Fort Myer, Virginia. His positions there included plans and training officer (S3), assistant commandant, and commandant. In 1964, he retired from the Army Reserve having attained the rank of colonel.

During that time, from 1947 to 1969, he also held the civilian position as the commandant of the Charlotte Hall Military Academy. In the early 1970s, he worked as a manager for Franklin Wholesale, Inc. in Waldorf, Maryland. From 1974 to 1993, he served on the board of directors of the Southern Maryland Electric Cooperative (SMECO).

== Later life ==
He married Jane Spaulding Bennett Sothoron, with whom he had four children. Their eldest son, Norwood, Jr., likewise became an Army officer and was awarded the Silver Star in Viet Nam. Their second son, John, also played lacrosse at Towson University. Norwood and Jane Sothoron eventually retired to Lexington Park, Maryland. He was a member of the Lions Club for over 40 years and served as president and deputy district governor.

In 1972, Sothoron was elected to the National Lacrosse Hall of Fame. In 1983, he was inducted into the University of Maryland Athletic Hall of Fame. Sothoron died in 2005 after a long battle with Alzheimer's disease.
