= 1934 All-Southern Conference football team =

The 1934 All-Southern Conference football team consists of American football players chosen by the Associated Press (AP) and United Press (UP) for the All-Southern Conference football team for the 1934 college football season.

== All-Southern Conference selections ==
=== Quarterbacks ===
- Ace Parker, Duke (AP-1)
- Hal Mauney, South Carolina (AP-2)
- Thomas Johnson, Virginia (AP-3)

=== Halfbacks ===
- Corky Cornelius, Duke (AP-1)
- Charlie Shaffer, North Carolina (AP-1)
- Sam Mattox, Washington & Lee (AP-2)
- Randy Hinson, Clemson (AP-2)
- George Maxie Smith, VPI (AP-3)
- Duncan Holsclaw, VPI (AP-3)

=== Fullbacks ===
- Norwood Sothoron, Maryland (AP-1)
- Jack Alexander, Duke (AP-2)
- Ray Rex, NC State (AP-3)

=== Ends ===
- Earl Wentz, Duke (AP-1)
- Dave Thomas, VPI (AP-1)
- Smith, Washington & Lee (AP-2)
- Ray Redding, NC State (AP-2)
- John Leys, Virginia (AP-3)
- Stanley Fellers, Clemson (AP-3)

=== Tackles ===
- Jim Tatum, North Carolina (AP-1)
- Gus Durner, Duke (AP-1)
- Bill Dyer, Washington & Lee (AP-2)
- Carl Isaacs, NC State (AP-2)
- Owings, Washington & Lee (AP-3)
- Tom Brown, Clemson (AP-3)

=== Guards ===
- George T. Barclay, North Carolina (AP-1)
- Jack Dunlap, Duke (AP-1)
- Minion, Maryland (AP-2)
- Jim Farley, VMI (AP-2)
- Bonins, Washington & Lee (AP-3)
- Ed Kahn, North Carolina (AP-3)

=== Centers ===
- Steve Sabol, NC State (AP-1)
- Jack Dunlap, Duke (AP-2)
- Glynn, Washington & Lee (AP-3)

== Key ==
AP = Associated Press

UP = United Press

== See also ==
- 1934 College Football All-America Team
