= Bill Howe =

American baseball player

William F. Howe (May 27, 1922 – June 26, 2007) was a baseball player at Yale University, most notable for earning First-Team All-American honors and playing in the inaugural 1947 College World Series alongside teammate George H. W. Bush and against the University of California's Jackie Jensen.

The son of Brigadier General William Francis Howe, Bill Howe attended Phillips Andover Academy before going on to serve as a first Lieutenant as a bombardier with the 15th Air Force in World War II. For his service, Howe was awarded the Distinguished Flying Cross.

Howe went on to attend Yale University, where he played baseball and ice hockey. Howe would remain involved in sports throughout his life, winning the Rhode Island State Squash championship several times and owning a sporting goods store in Providence, Rhode Island.
