= 1947 NCAA baseball tournament =

American college sports championship

1947 NCAA I baseball tournament
- Season: 1947
- Teams: 8
- Finals site: Hyames Field; Kalamazoo, MI
- Champions: California (1st title)
- Runner-up: Yale (1st CWS Appearance)
- Winning coach: Clint Evans (1st title)

The 1947 NCAA baseball tournament was the first NCAA-sanctioned baseball tournament that determined a national champion. The tournament was held as the conclusion of the 1947 NCAA baseball season, beginning on June 20. The 1947 College World Series was played at Hyames Field on the campus of Western Michigan University in Kalamazoo, Michigan from June 27 to June 28. The first tournament's champion was California, coached by Clint Evans.

== Tournament ==
The tournament was divided into two regional brackets, the Eastern playoff and the Western playoff. Each region played a single elimination bracket, with the champion advancing to the College World Series.

=== Field ===
The tournament field was determined by regional committees, some of whom held playoffs, while others selected specific conference champions, and still others simply selected their representatives. The eight teams were divided among the East and West brackets.

School	Conference	Record (Conference)	Berth
California	CIBA	27–10 (11–4)	District selection
Clemson	Southern	24–4 (13–2)	Won Southern District Playoff
Denver	Mountain States		
Illinois	Big Nine	22–5 (9–3)	
NYU	MNYC		
Oklahoma	Big Six	15–12 (7–4)	Won District Playoff
Texas	SWC	19–3 (14–1)	District selection
Yale	EIBL	17–8–1 (9–3)	District selection

=== Eastern playoff ===
At Yale Field, New Haven, Connecticut

Semifinals
Yale	7
Clemson	3
NYU	2
Illinois	1

Finals
Yale	6
NYU	4

=== Western playoff ===
At Merchants Park, Denver, Colorado

Semifinals
California	3
Denver	1
Texas	10
Oklahoma	9

Finals
California	8
Texas	7

== College World Series ==
=== Participants ===
School	Conference	Record (conference)	Head coach	CWS appearances	CWS best finish	CWS record
California	CIBA	29–10 (11–4)	Clint Evans	0 (last: none)	none	0–0
Yale	EIBL	19–8–1 (9–3)	Ethan Allen	0 (last: none)	none	0–0

=== Results ===
The first College World Series was a best of three series.

==== Bracket ====
College World Series Finals
California	17	8	–
Yale	4	7	–

==== Game results ====
Date	Game	Winner	Score	Loser	Notes
June 27	Game 1	California	17–4	Yale	
June 28	Game 2	California	8–7	Yale	California wins CWS

=== Notable players ===
- California: Jackie Jensen
- Yale: Frank Quinn, George Bush, Bill Howe

=== Tournament notes ===
Future President of the United States George H. W. Bush was Yale's captain and appeared in the 1947 and 1948 College World Series. (Bush was actually waiting on-deck when Cal recorded the final out in the second game of the 1947 series.)
