= 1947 NCAA baseball season =

Baseball season

Tournament
- Duration: June 20–28, 1947

College World Series
- Duration: June 27–28, 1947
- Champions: California (1st title)
- Runners-up: Yale (1st CWS Appearance)
- Winning coach: Clint Evans (1st title)

Seasons
- ← 1946 1948 →

The 1947 NCAA baseball season, play of college baseball in the United States organized by the National Collegiate Athletic Association (NCAA) began in the spring of 1947. The season progressed through the regular season and concluded with the 1947 NCAA baseball tournament and 1947 College World Series. The College World Series, held for the first time in 1947, consisted of the two remaining teams in the NCAA Tournament and was held in Kalamazoo, Michigan at Hyames Field as a best of three series. California claimed the championship two games to none over Yale.

== Realignment ==
The Southern Conference resumed sponsoring baseball in 1947, with 16 teams.

== Conference winners ==
This is a partial list of conference champions from the 1947 season. Each of the eight geographical districts chose, by various methods, the team that would represent them in the NCAA Tournament. Conference champions had to be chosen, unless all conference champions declined the bid.

Conference	Regular season winner	Conference Tournament	Tournament City	Tournament Winner
Big Nine	Illinois	No Conference Tournament		
Big Six	Oklahoma	No Conference Tournament		
CIBA	California/Southern California	No Conference Tournament		
EIBL	Yale	No Conference Tournament		
Metropolitan New York Conference	NYU	No Conference Tournament		
Mid-American Conference	Ohio	No Conference Tournament		
Missouri Valley Conference	Oklahoma A&M	1947 Missouri Valley Conference baseball tournament		Oklahoma A&M
Pacific Coast Conference North	Washington State	No Conference Tournament		
Southeastern Conference	Alabama	No Conference Tournament		
Southern Conference	Clemson	No Conference Tournament		
Southwest Conference	Texas	No Conference Tournament		

== Conference standings ==
The following is an incomplete list of conference standings:

1947 Eastern Intercollegiate Baseball League baseball standings
	Conf.						Overall
Team	W		L		T	PCT	W		L		T	PCT
Yale ‍†‍‍^{y}	9	–	3	–	0	.750	19	–	10	–	1	.650
Columbia ‍‍‍	7	–	5	–	0	.583	8	–	7	–	1	.531
Harvard ‍‍‍	7	–	5	–	0	.583	12	–	13	–	0	.480
Princeton ‍‍‍	7	–	5	–	0	.583	10	–	12	–	0	.455
Penn ‍‍‍	6	–	6	–	0	.500	12	–	9	–	0	.571
Dartmouth ‍‍‍	3	–	9	–	0	.250	5	–	16	–	0	.238
Cornell ‍‍‍	3	–	9	–	0	.250	8	–	17	–	0	.320
† – Conference champion y – Invited to the NCAA Tournament

1947 Pacific Coast Conference baseball standings
	Conf.				Overall
Team	W		L	PCT	W		L	PCT
North
Washington State ‍†‍‍	11	–	5	.688	23	–	11	.676
Oregon ‍‍‍	9	–	7	.563	19	–	7	.731
Washington ‍‍‍	9	–	7	.563	9	–	7	.563
Oregon State ‍‍‍	6	–	10	.375	14	–	11	.560
Idaho ‍‍‍	5	–	11	.313		–		–
California Intercollegiate Baseball Association
California ‍†‍‍^{y}	11	–	4	.733	31	–	10	.756
Southern California ‍†‍‍	11	–	4	.733	16	–	6	.727
Stanford ‍‍‍	7	–	8	.467	19	–	11	.633
UCLA ‍‍‍	7	–	8	.467	29	–	15	.659
St. Mary's ‍‍‍	5	–	10	.333		–		–
Santa Clara ‍‍‍	4	–	11	.267	10	–	15	.400
† – Conference champion y – Invited to the NCAA Tournament

1947 Southern Conference baseball standings
	Conf.				Overall
Team	W		L	PCT	W		L	PCT
Clemson ‍†‍‍^{y}	13	–	2	.867	24	–	5	.828
Richmond ‍‍‍	8	–	3	.727	20	–	3	.870
Duke ‍‍‍	13	–	6	.684		–		–
Virginia Tech ‍‍‍	4	–	3	.571	11	–	6	.647
Maryland ‍‍‍	4	–	3	.571	10	–	10	.500
Washington and Lee ‍‍‍	5	–	4	.556		–		–
North Carolina ‍‍‍	9	–	7	.563	15	–	11	.577
NC State ‍‍‍	7	–	8	.467		–		–
William & Mary ‍‍‍	6	–	8	.429	15	–	8	.652
Wake Forest ‍‍‍	6	–	8	.429	15	–	8	.652
Furman ‍‍‍	4	–	6	.400		–		–
South Carolina ‍‍‍	5	–	8	.385		–		–
VMI ‍‍‍	2	–	6	.250		–		–
The Citadel ‍‍‍	1	–	3	.250	2	–	5	.286
George Washington ‍‍‍	1	–	4	.200		–		–
Davidson ‍‍‍	0	–	10	.000		–		–
† – Conference champion As of June 30, 1947; Rankings from Collegiate Baseball

1947 Southwest Conference baseball standings
	Conf.				Overall
Team	W		L	PCT	W		L	PCT
Texas ‍†‍‍^{y}	14	–	1	.933	20	–	4	.833
Baylor ‍‍‍	9	–	5	.643	12	–	8	.600
Texas A&M ‍‍‍	8	–	6	.571	14	–	8	.636
SMU ‍‍‍	5	–	9	.357	6	–	9	.400
Rice ‍‍‍	4	–	10	.286	5	–	11	.313
TCU ‍‍‍	3	–	12	.200	4	–	15	.211
† – Conference champion y – Invited to the NCAA tournament As of June 30, 1947; Rankings from Collegiate Baseball

== NCAA tournament ==
The 1947 season marked the first NCAA Baseball Tournament, which consisted of eight teams divided into two brackets by region. The Eastern playoff was held in New Haven, Connecticut, while the Western playoff was held in Denver, Colorado. The winner of each single elimination bracket advanced to the inaugural College World Series in Kalamazoo, MI, where California defeated Yale in a best of three series.

College World Series Finals
California	17	8	–
Yale	4	7	–
