= Evans Diamond =

College baseball stadium in Berkeley, California

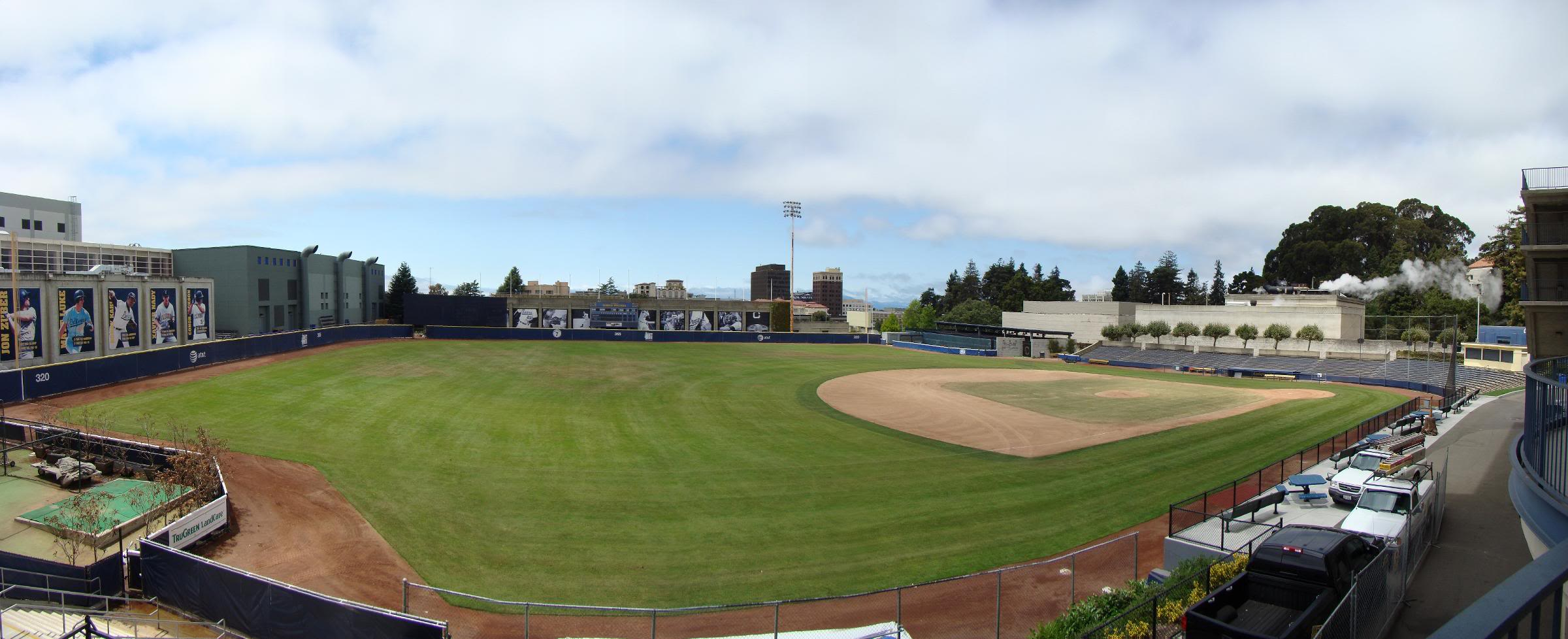
- Evans Diamond Panorama in 2011

- Location in the United States Location in California
- Interactive map of Evans Diamond
- Full name: Evans Diamond at Stu Gordon Stadium
- Former names: Edwards Field
- Location: University of California; Berkeley, California, U.S.
- Coordinates: 37°52′10″N 122°15′48″W
- Owner: University of California
- Operator: University of California
- Capacity: 2,500
- Surface: Natural grass (1933–); Dirt: cinder/clay
- Field size: Corners: 320 ft (98 m); Alleys: 365 ft (111 m); Center: 395 ft (120 m)
- Public transit: Downtown Berkeley

Construction
- Opened: 1933; 93 years ago
- Renovated: 1992

Tenant
- California Golden Bears (NCAA) 1933–present

Website
- CalBears.com

Evans Diamond at Stu Gordon Stadium is a college baseball park on the west coast of the United States, located on the campus of the University of California, Berkeley.

Opened 93 years ago in 1933, it is the home field of the California Golden Bears of the Atlantic Coast Conference, with a seating capacity of 2,500. Evans Diamond is located in the UC sports complex at the southwest corner of campus, pressed between George C. Edwards Stadium to the west (right field) and Haas Pavilion to the east.

== History ==
Originally named Edwards Field, it was renamed after Clint Evans, the California head coach from 1930–54.

The stadium was renovated in 1992 at a cost of $275,000, paid for by the donations of UC alumni, with construction by RNT Landscaping of San Leandro.

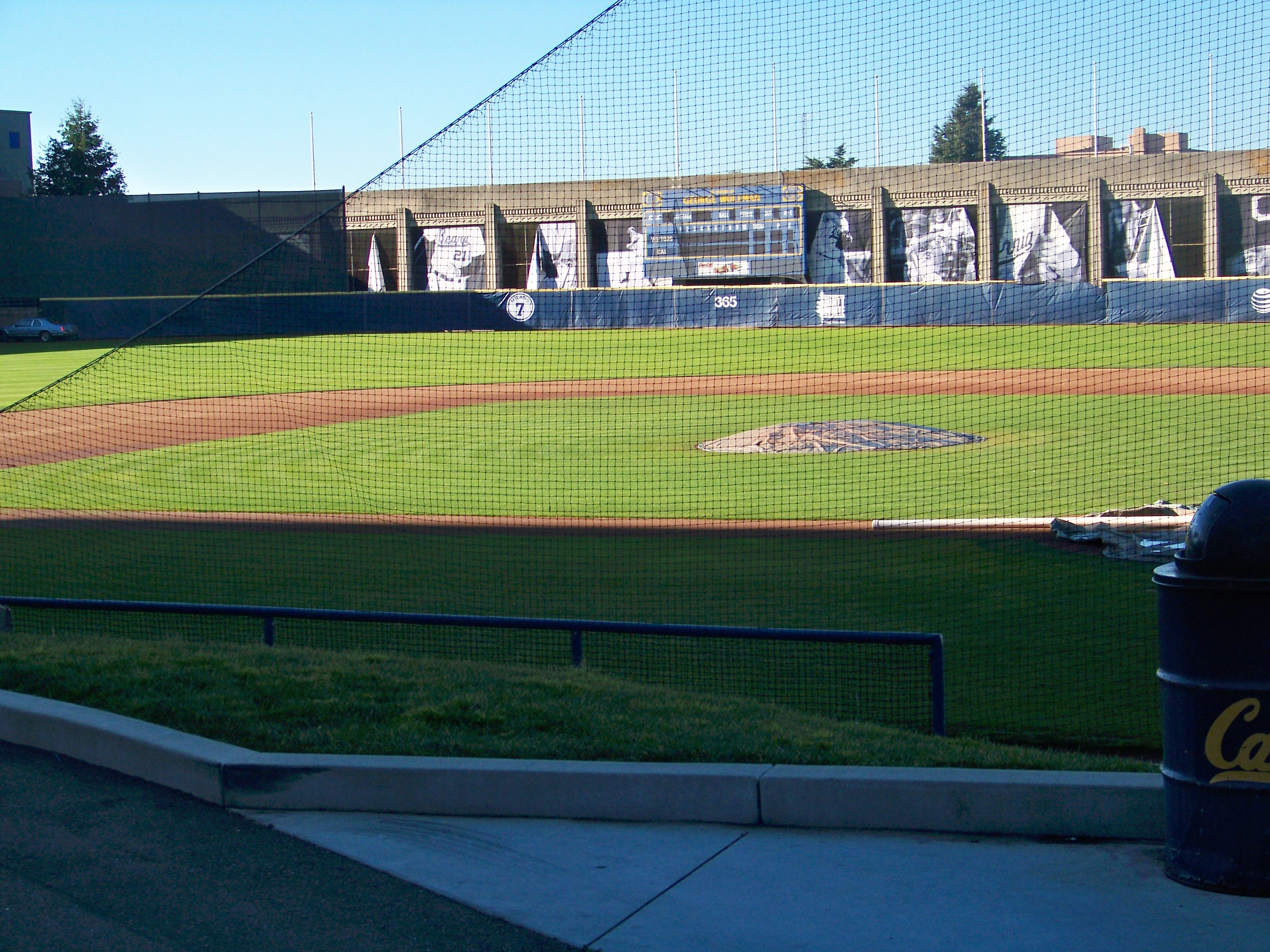
View from east in 2009

On March 13, 2022, the stadium was named after Stu Gordon, a California baseball alumnus who helped found the Bear Backers program and led the cause for the baseball team's reinstatement in 2011.

The turf at Evans Diamond is natural grass, and the infield dirt is a combination of crushed cinder and the traditional clay.

The outfield wall is 320 feet (98 m) from home plate in the corners, 365 feet (111 m) in the power alleys, and 395 feet (120 m) in center field. In the right field corner are the batting cages and pitching machines, covered by a roof (but not enclosed); the bullpen is outside of the roof, closer to the warning track. In the left field corner is the other bullpen, without batting cages. Both bullpens are separated from the field of play by fences.

The Jackie Jensen press box lies directly behind home plate, above the last row of stands. Beyond the left field wall is Bancroft Way, the southern border of the UC campus. Beyond the right field wall is the concrete grandstand for the track stadium.

The baseball field has an unorthodox southwest alignment (home plate to center field), with the catcher, batter, and fans facing the mid-afternoon sun. (The optimal orientation of a baseball diamond is east-northeast.) The approximate elevation of the field is 240 feet (75 m) above sea level.

== Future ==
Evans Diamond is in need of major renovations because the stadium is no longer considered up to the standards needed to host NCAA tournament games. This was a problem as recently as 2011, when the Golden Bears were forced to move their host stadium venue for the 2011 Super Regional against Dallas Baptist University to Stephen Schott Stadium in Santa Clara, as Evans Diamond did not have lights as required.

One of the Cal Baseball Foundation's primary goals is to see improvements at Evans Diamond, including the addition of field lights for night games. In the near future, the facility will also have to be able to host large television crews to accommodate the Pac-12 Network. Before California baseball's alumni game on October 21, 2012, it was announced that Evans Diamond will receive lights and a new video and scoreboard by the first conference games in 2013. For the first time in the venue's history, Evans Diamond will be able to host night games during the 2013 season. While the actual stadium has in the past been considered inadequate by NCAA standards, the baseball program does have relatively new locker rooms and training facilities inside neighboring Haas Pavilion.

== See also ==
- List of NCAA Division I baseball venues
