= Joe Landrum =

American baseball player (1928-2018)

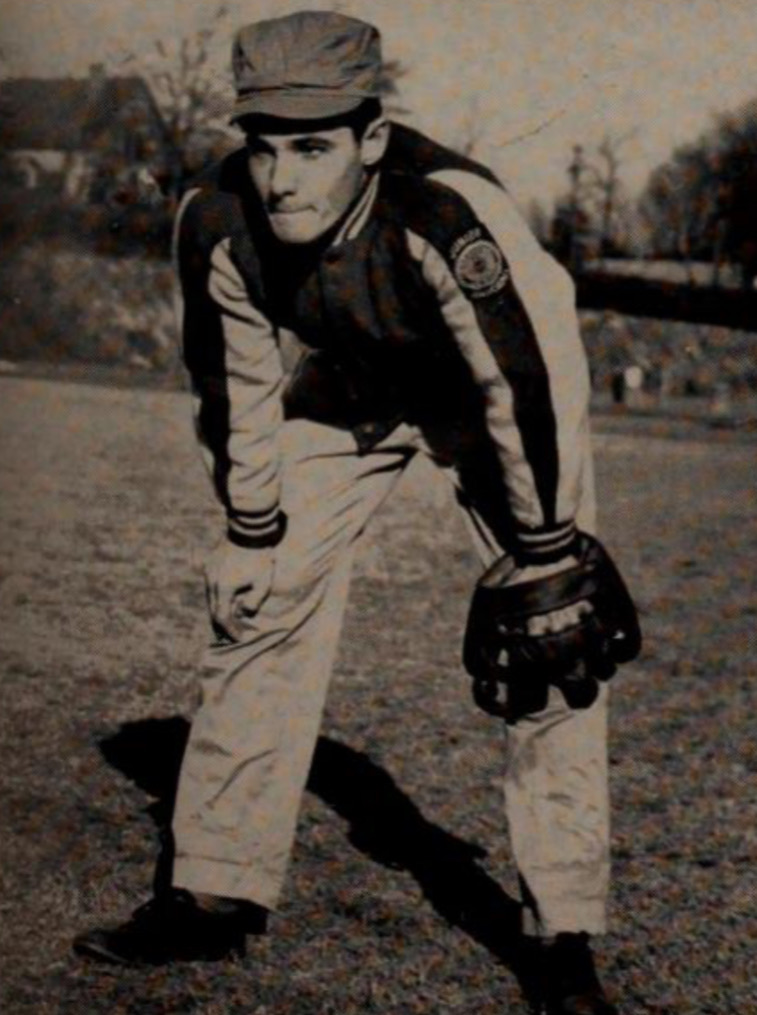
- Pitcher
- Born: December 13, 1928; Columbia, South Carolina, U.S.
- Died: August 19, 2018 (aged 89); Columbia, South Carolina, U.S.
- Batted: Right Threw: Right

MLB debut
- July 13, 1950, for the Brooklyn Dodgers

Last MLB appearance
- September 11, 1952, for the Brooklyn Dodgers

MLB statistics
- Win–loss record: 1–3
- Earned run average: 5.64
- Strikeouts: 22
- Stats at Baseball Reference

Teams
- Brooklyn Dodgers (1950, 1952)

Joseph Butler Landrum (December 13, 1928 – August 19, 2018) was an American professional baseball player who played as a pitcher in Major League Baseball. A native of Columbia, South Carolina, he pitched in 16 games during the 1950 and 1952 seasons for the Brooklyn Dodgers.

== Personal life ==
Landrum's son, Bill Landrum, also pitched in the majors.

On August 19, 2018, Landrum passed away at the age of 89.
