= Bush Field (Yale) =

Stadium in West Haven, Connecticut

George H. W. Bush Field
- Bush Field
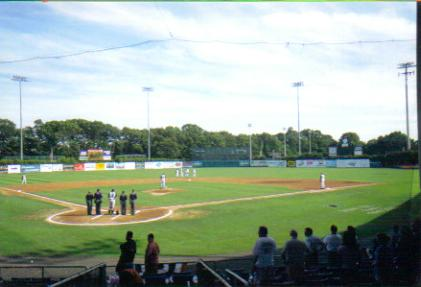
- Interactive map of George H. W. Bush Field
- Full name: George H. W. Bush Field
- Former names: Yale Field (1928–2021)
- Location: 252 Derby Avenue, West Haven, Connecticut
- Coordinates: 41°18′33.43″N 72°57′32.18″W
- Capacity: 6,200
- Surface: Turf
- Field size: Left Field: 330 ft (100 m); Left-Center Field: 375 ft (114 m); Center Field: 405 ft (123 m); Right-Center Field: 375 ft (114 m); Right Field: 330 ft (100 m)

Construction
- Opened: 1928; 98 years ago

Tenants
- Yale Bulldogs (NCAA) (1928–present); New Haven Ravens (EL) (1994–2003); New Haven County Cutters (CAAPB) (2004–2007)

George H. W. Bush Field (commonly known as Bush Field, originally Yale Field) is a stadium in West Haven, Connecticut, just across the city line with New Haven, Connecticut. It is primarily used for the Yale University baseball team, the Bulldogs, and, until 2007 was also the home field of the New Haven County Cutters Canadian-American Association of Professional Baseball minor league baseball team. Yale's baseball team has played continuously at the same site since 1885 while the field was constructed and opened in April 1928.

== Features ==
The seats at Bush Field are a mix of standard plastic stadium seats and metal bleachers. The scoreboard is hand operated and the stadium capacity has been reduced from a high of 12,000 to its current 6,200. Bush Field is not located on the school’s campus in downtown New Haven, but about a mile and a half away in neighboring West Haven. Also located at the sports complex is the Yale Bowl, Reese Stadium, the Coxe Cage and the Connecticut Tennis Center.

== History ==
Yale University fielded their first baseball team in 1864. The team played at various sites around campus until 1882, when the university purchased an apple orchard and farm in neighboring West Haven and built a modest ball field on the site. In 1927 the school replaced the open field surrounded by few bleachers with a concrete and steel structure that cost a half million dollars to build. Yale Field was also the name of the football stadium prior to the Yale Bowl opening in 1914.

In a 1941 game, with Smoky Joe Wood as manager, and Joe Jr. on the mound, the Bulldogs faced Colgate whose roster included two of Smoky Joe's other sons, Steve and Bob Wood. Yale prevailed 11–5.

During President George H. W. Bush's days playing baseball for Yale, the team played in both the 1947 and 1948 College World Series, losing to the University of California in 1947 and to USC in 1948. Yale's manager during this time was former big leaguer Ethan Allen. Yale Field hosted what is believed to be the first game of the NCAA Division I Baseball Championship in 1947 when Yale hosted Clemson.

Yale Field was the site for one of the most famous college baseball games of all time. On May 21, 1981, during a qualifying game for the College World Series, Ron Darling from Yale and Frank Viola from St. Johns dueled through 11 scoreless innings before St. Johns broke through with a run in the 12th inning to win 1–0. Both pitchers went on to have distinguished Major League careers. Darling pitched 11 innings of no-hit ball (still a college playoff record) before surrendering a single in the 12th inning. In attendance at the game was Yale President and soon-to-be Commissioner of Baseball, A. Bartlett Giamatti as well as pitching great and ex-Yale Baseball Coach, Smoky Joe Wood. Renowned baseball author Roger Angell was also at the game and wrote an article about the game for the New Yorker Magazine, entitled "The Web of the Game" Ron Darling devoted an entire chapter to this game in his 2009 book; "The Complete Game, Reflections on Baseball, Pitching, and Life on the Mound", published by Alfred A. Knoff, a division of Random House.

On July 8, 1998, the ballpark hosted the Double-A All-Star Game in which a team of National League-affiliated All-Stars defeated a team of American League-affiliated All-Stars, 2–1, before 6,248 people in attendance.

In 2021, Yale Field was renamed George H. W. Bush Field in honor of President George H. W. Bush, who captained the team during his senior year.

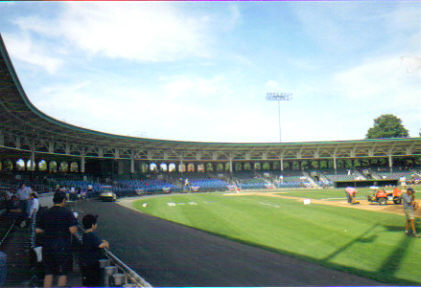

== See also ==
- List of NCAA Division I baseball venues
