= List of baseball parks in Denver =

Coordinates: 39.7392°N 104.9850°W

Location of Denver in the United States of America.

This is a list of venues used for professional baseball in Denver, Colorado, United States. The information is a synthesis of the information contained in the references listed.

== Broadway Grounds (I) ==
=== Home of ===
- First recorded baseball game in Denver (about April 30, 1862) - McNeils 20, Hulls 7
- Denver Brown Stockings (ca. 1878-1879)

=== Location ===
East 16th Avenue (north); Lincoln Street (east); East Colfax Avenue aka East 15th Avenue (south); North Broadway (west); catty-corner to the northwest of the state capitol

=== Currently ===
Part of the Civic Center

== Larimer Street Baseball Park ==
=== Home of ===
- Denver – Colorado League or Rocky Mountain League (1885)* Denver Mountain Lions – Western League (1886)

=== Location ===
Larimer Street (southeast); 32nd Street (southwest); Blake Street (northwest); 33rd Street (northeast). About 10 blocks northeast of the eventual site of Coors Field

=== Currently ===
Commercial/industrial

== River Front Park ==
=== Home of ===
Denver Mountaineers – Western League / Western Association (1887–88)

=== Location ===
Plot of land roughly bounded by 16th Street (southwest); 17th Street (northeast); Bassett Street (southeast); and the Platte River (northwest). Part of what is now Commons Park

=== External links ===
- Sanborn map of part of the park, 1890

== Athletic Park or Broadway Park (II) ==
=== Home of ===
- Denver Grizzlies/Mountaineers – Western Association (1889–91 or 92)
- Denver Solis – Colorado State League (1889 only)
- Denver Grizzlies – Western Association (1895 part season)
- Denver Gulfs – Colorado State League (1898 only)
- Denver Grizzlies/Bears – Western League (1900–17)

=== Location ===
North Broadway (east, first base); Cherry Creek (northeast, right field corner); West 7th Avenue (north, right field); South 14th Street (now Acoma Street) (west, left field); West 6th Avenue (south, third base) - Denver Health Medical Center across Acoma to the west

=== Currently ===
Hotel and parking garage

=== External links ===
- Sanborn Map showing ballpark, 1890
- Sanborn Map showing ballpark, 1903 (rebuilt after fire of July 16, 1901

== Merchants Park ==
=== Home of ===
- Denver Bears – Western League (1922–32)
- Denver Bears – Western League (1941 only)
- Denver – Western League (1947 – mid-1948)

=== Location ===
600 South Broadway (east, first base); Virginia Avenue (south, third base); Bannock Street (west, left field); Dakota Avenue (north, right field). Near Alameda Avenue (two blocks farther north); location also given as Exposition Avenue (two blocks south) and Broadway

=== Current use ===
Site of Broadway Plaza shopping center and business complex

== Mile High Stadium ==
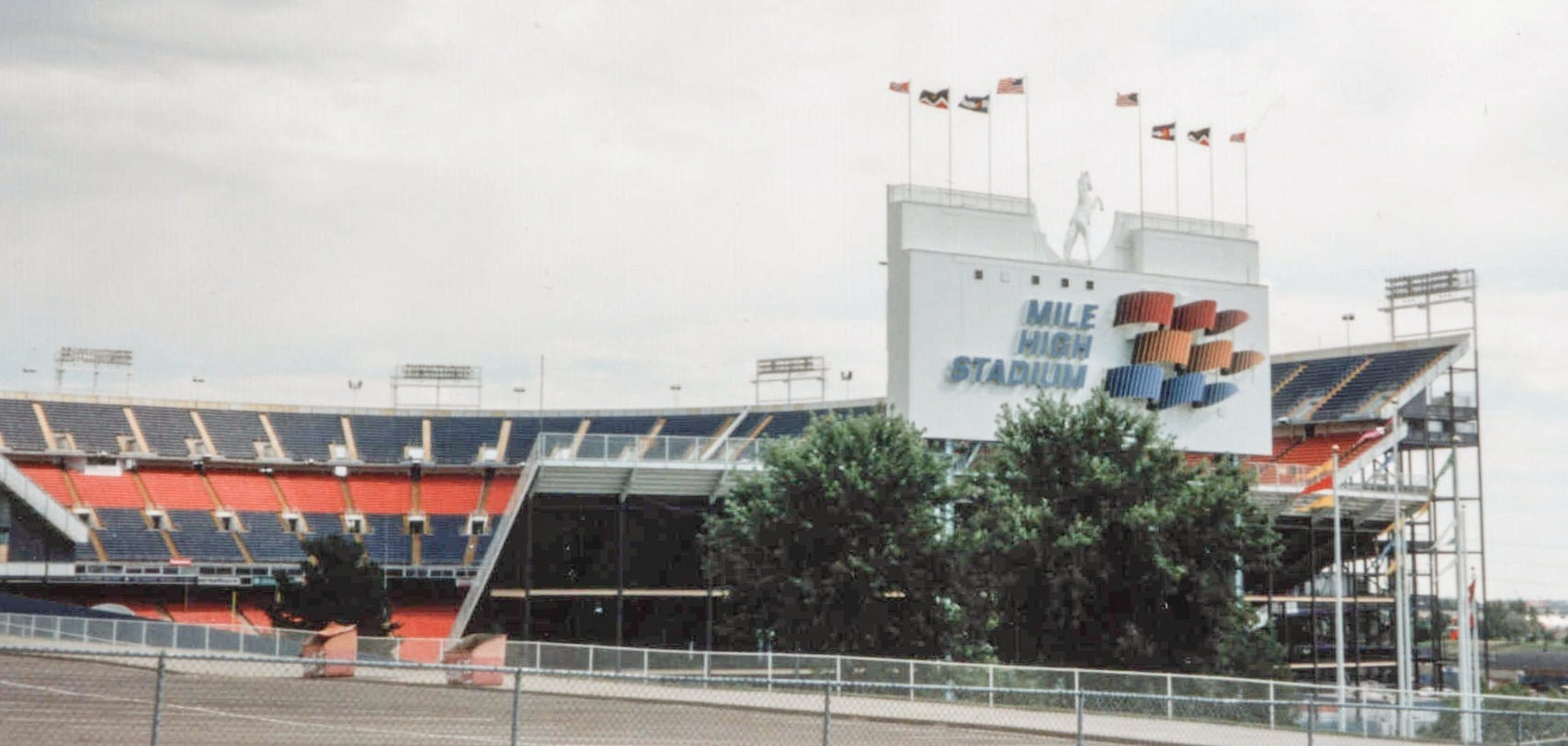

Originally Bears Stadium

=== Home of ===
- Denver Bears – Western League (mid-1948–1954)
- Denver Bears/Zephyrs – American Association (1955–62) / Pacific Coast League (1963–68) / AA (1969–92)
- Colorado Rockies – National League (1993–mid-1994 [season shortened by players' strike])

=== Location ===
2755 West 17th Avenue (south, right field); Elliot Street (west, first base); West 20th Street (north, third base); Clay Street (east, left field – now part of Mile High Stadium Circle)

=== Previously ===
City dump

=== Currently ===
Parking lot for Sports Authority Field, which overlaps the old site in the southwest (center field) portion

== Coors Field ==
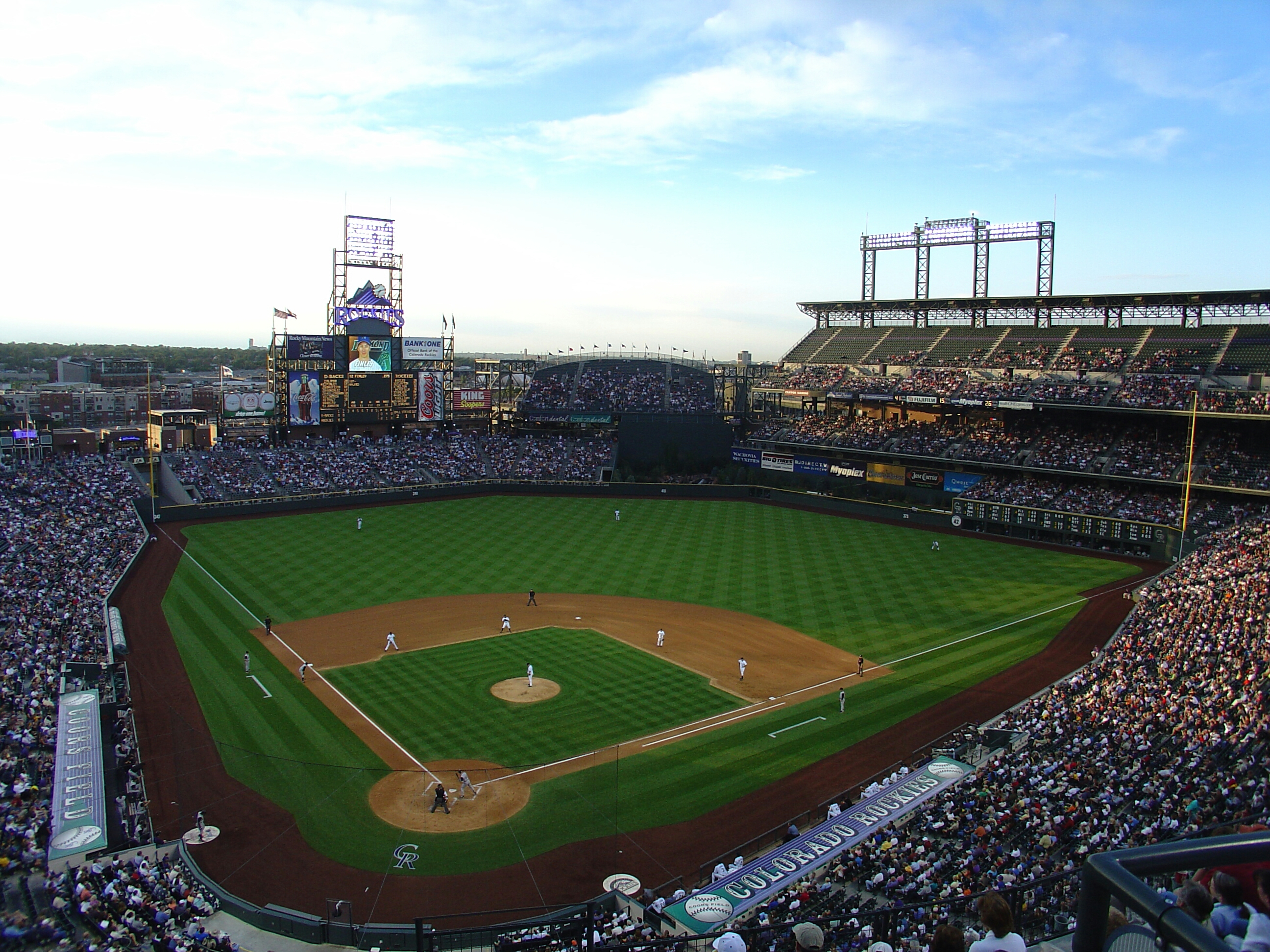

=== Home of ===
Colorado Rockies – NL (1995–present)

=== Location ===
2001 Blake Street (southeast, first base); 20th Street (southwest, third base); railroad tracks, then Wewatta Street (northwest, left field); 22nd Street (northeast, right field)

=== Previously ===
Denver Pacific Railroad Station and Union Pacific Railroad buildings

== See also ==
- Lists of baseball parks
- Bibliography of Colorado
- Geography of Colorado
- History of Colorado
- Index of Colorado-related articles
- List of Colorado-related lists
- Outline of Colorado

== Sources ==
- Ballparks of North America, Michael Benson, McFarland, 1989.
