= Clint Evans (baseball) =

American baseball coach

Clinton W. Evans (April 2, 1889 – March 10, 1975) was an American college baseball coach at the University of California, Berkeley from 1930 to 1954. A graduate of the university and member of Phi Sigma Kappa fraternity, he led the Bears to the first College World Series championship in 1947. He retired with a career record of 547–256. Cal's baseball field was renamed Evans Diamond in his honor. Evans died at age 85 in Orinda, California. He was elected to the University of California Hall of Fame in 1986.
