= 1960 College Baseball All-America Team =

This is a list of college baseball players named first team All-Americans for the 1960 NCAA University Division baseball season. From 1947 to 1963, the American Baseball Coaches Association was the only generally recognized All-America selector, so any player selected by the ABCA is considered a "consensus" All-American.

== Key ==
A	American Baseball Coaches Association
	Member of the National College Baseball Hall of Fame
	Consensus All-American – selected the ABCA

== All-Americans ==
Position	Name	School	#	A	Other awards and honors
Pitcher	Bruce Gardner	USC	1	✓	
Pitcher	Dick Soergel	Oklahoma State	1	✓	
Catcher	Alan Hall	Arizona	1	✓	
First baseman	Wayne Knapp	Minnesota	1	✓	
Second baseman	Larry Fegley	Penn State	1	✓	
Shortstop	Ron Cox	Missouri	1	✓	
Third baseman	Jake Gibbs	Ole Miss	1	✓	College Football Hall of Fame
Outfielder	Ty Cline	Clemson	1	✓	
Outfielder	Thomas Perdue	Ohio State	1	✓	
Outfielder	Larry Petersen	Oregon State	1	✓	

== See also ==
- List of college baseball awards
