= 1960 NCAA University Division baseball rankings =

1960 NCAA University Division baseball season

Tournament

College World Series
- Champions: Minnesota (2nd title)
- Runners-up: USC (6th CWS Appearance)
- Winning Coach: Dick Siebert (2nd title)
- MOP: John Erickson (Minnesota)

Seasons
- ← 1959 1961 →

The following poll makes up the 1960 NCAA University Division baseball rankings. Collegiate Baseball Newspaper published its first human poll of the top 20 teams in college baseball in 1957.

== Collegiate Baseball ==
Currently, only the final poll from the 1960 season is available.

Rank	Team
1	Minnesota
2	Southern California
3	Arizona
4	Oklahoma State
5	St. John's
6	Boston College
7	Colorado State College (Note: Colorado State College is currently known as the University of Northern Colorado. Not to be confused with Colorado State University, then known as Colorado A&M.)
8	North Carolina
9	Ole Miss
10	Arizona State
11	Texas
12	Washington State
13	Detroit
14	Southern
15	Pepperdine
16	California
17	Ohio
18	Notre Dame
19	Sam Houston State
20	The Citadel
