= 1959 NCAA University Division baseball rankings =

1959 NCAA University Division baseball season

Tournament

College World Series
- Champions: Oklahoma State (1st title)
- Runners-up: Arizona (5th CWS Appearance)
- Winning Coach: Toby Greene (1st title)
- MOP: Jim Dobson (Oklahoma State)

Seasons
- 1960 →

The following poll makes up the 1959 NCAA University Division baseball rankings. Collegiate Baseball Newspaper published its first human poll of the top 20 teams in college baseball in 1957, however 1959 is the first season for which records are available.

== Collegiate Baseball ==
Currently, only the final poll from the 1959 season is available.

| Rank | Team |
|---|---|
| 1 | Oklahoma State |
| 2 | Arizona |
| 3 | Fresno State |
| 4 | Penn State |
| 5 | Clemson |
| 6 | Western Michigan |
| 7 | Connecticut |
| 8 | Colorado State College (Note: Colorado State College is currently known as the University of Northern Colorado. Not to be confused with Colorado State University, then known as Colorado A&M.) |
| 9 | Southern California |
| 10 | Notre Dame |
| 11 | Minnesota |
| 12 | Bradley |
| 13 | Texas A&M |
| 14 | Illinois |
| 15 | Santa Clara |
| 16 | Ole Miss |
| 17 | Georgia Tech |
| 18 | Missouri |
| 19 | Southern |
| 20 | Rollins |
