= 1960 NCAA University Division baseball tournament =

American college sports championship

- Season: 1960
- Teams: 25
- Finals site: Johnny Rosenblatt Stadium; Omaha, NE
- Champions: Minnesota (2nd title)
- Runner-up: Southern California (4th CWS Appearance)
- Winning coach: Dick Siebert (2nd title)
- MOP: John Erickson (Minnesota)

The 1960 NCAA University Division baseball tournament was played at the end of the 1960 NCAA University Division baseball season to determine the national champion of college baseball. The tournament concluded with eight teams competing in the College World Series, a double-elimination tournament in its fourteenth year. Eight regional districts sent representatives to the College World Series with preliminary rounds within each district serving to determine each representative. These events would later become known as regionals. Each district had its own format for selecting teams, resulting in 25 teams participating in the tournament at the conclusion of their regular season, and in some cases, after a conference tournament. The College World Series was held in Omaha, NE from June 10 to June 20. The fourteenth tournament's champion was Minnesota, coached by Dick Siebert. The Most Outstanding Player was John Erickson of Minnesota.

== Tournament ==
The official NCAA record book does not list any participants for District 5 as Oklahoma State was an automatic qualifier for the 1960 College World Series.

=== District 1 ===
Games played at Springfield, Massachusetts.

Semifinals
Boston College	2
Connecticut	1
Holy Cross	5
American International	1

Finals
Boston College	5
Holy Cross	4

=== District 2 ===
Games played at Cooperstown, New York.

Semifinals
Delaware	15
Colgate	4
St. John's	7
Villanova	2

Finals
Delaware	3
St. John's (NY)	4

=== District 3 ===
Games played at Gastonia, North Carolina.

First Round
The Citadel	4
Florida	2^{6}
North Carolina	2
Florida Southern	1
Lower round 1
Florida	5
Florida Southern	0^{6}

Semi-Finals
The Citadel	1
North Carolina	13
Lower final
The Citadel	1
Florida	4

Finals
North Carolina	7	—
Florida	5	—

=== District 4 ===
Games played at Saint Paul, Minnesota.

First Round
Minnesota	15
Notre Dame	6
Detroit	16
Ohio	2
Lower round 1
Notre Dame	4
Ohio	5

Semi-Finals
Minnesota	12
Detroit	5
Lower final
Detroit	14
Ohio	4

Finals
Minnesota	5	—
Detroit	4	—

=== District 5 ===
- Oklahoma State (automatic qualifier)

=== District 6 ===
Semifinals; Austin, Texas		Finals; Tucson, Arizona
		Houston	3	4	—
Houston	4	Arizona	4	6	—
Texas	2

=== District 7 ===
Games played at Salt Lake City, Utah.

Finals
Colorado State College	3	3	6
Utah	24	2	2

=== District 8 ===
Games played at Los Angeles, California.

Semifinal				Final
				Washington State	8	3	5
Pepperdine	3	3	—	Southern California	7	8	10
Southern California	10	10	—

== College World Series ==
=== Participants ===
School	Conference	Record (conference)	Head coach	CWS appearances	CWS best finish	CWS record
Arizona	Border	41–7 (2–2)	Frank Sancet	5 (last: 1959)	2nd (1956, 1958)	10–10
Boston College	Greater Boston	14–4 (7–3)	Ed Peligrini	1 (last: 1953)	4th (1953)	2–2
Colorado State College (Note: Colorado State College is currently known as the University of Northern Colorado. Not to be confused with Colorado State University, then known as Colorado A&M.)	Rocky Mountain	25–10 (15–1)	Pete Butler	6 (last: 1959)	5th (1955)	2–12
Minnesota	Big 10	29–6–1 (12–2)	Dick Siebert	1 (last: 1956)	1st (1956)	5–1
North Carolina	ACC	22–5 (11–3)	Walt Rabb	0 (last: none)	none	0–0
Oklahoma State	Big 8	15–5 (12–4)	Toby Greene	3 (last: 1959)	1st (1959)	10–5
Southern California	CIBA	40–14 (12–4)	Rod Dedeaux	5 (last: 1958)	1st (1948, 1958)	10–8
St. John's	Metro	19–5 (10–4)	Jack Kaiser	1 (last: 1949)	4th (1949)	0–2

=== Results ===
==== Bracket ====
Upper round 1
Arizona	2
Oklahoma State	1
Minnesota	8
North Carolina	3
Boston College	8
Colorado State College	3
Southern California	3
St. John's	1

Upper round 2
Arizona	5
Minnesota	8
Boston College	2
Southern California	5
Lower round 1
Oklahoma State	7
North Carolina	0
Colorado State College	2
St. John's	3^{13}

Upper final
Minnesota	12^{10}
Southern California	11
Lower round 2
Boston College	0
Oklahoma State	1
Arizona	11
St. John's	4

Semifinals
Minnesota	3
Oklahoma State	1
Southern California	13
Arizona	1

Final
Minnesota	2	2^{10}
Southern California	4^{11}	1

==== Game results ====
Date	Game	Winner	Score	Loser	Notes
June 10	Game 1	Arizona	2–1	Oklahoma State	
June 14	Game 2	Minnesota	8–3	North Carolina	
June 14	Game 3	Boston College	8–3	Colorado State	
June 14	Game 4	Southern California	3–1	St. John's	
June 15	Game 5	Oklahoma State	7–0	North Carolina	Jim Wixson throws a no-hitter; North Carolina eliminated
June 15	Game 6	St. John's	3–2 (13)	Colorado State	Colorado State eliminated
June 15	Game 7	Minnesota	8–5	Arizona	
June 16	Game 8	Southern California	5–2	Boston College	
June 17	Game 9	Oklahoma State	1–0	Boston College	Boston College eliminated
June 17	Game 10	Arizona	11–4	St. John's	St. John's eliminated
June 17	Game 11	Minnesota	12–11 (10)	Southern California	
June 18	Game 12	Minnesota	3–1	Oklahoma State	Oklahoma State eliminated
June 18	Game 13	Southern California	13–1	Arizona	Arizona eliminated
June 19	Game 14	USC	4–2 (11)	Minnesota	
June 20	Final	Minnesota	2–1 (10)	USC	Minnesota wins CWS

=== All-Tournament Team ===
The following players were members of the All-Tournament Team.

Position	Player	School
P	Bruce Gardner	USC
P	Jim Ward	Arizona
P	Bob Wasko	Minnesota
C	Bill Heath	USC
1B	William Ryan	USC
2B	John Erickson (MOP)	Minnesota
3B	Cal Rolloff	Minnesota
SS	Dave Pflepsen	Minnesota
OF	Art Ersepke	USC
OF	Bob Levingston	USC
OF	Mickey McNamee	USC

=== Notable players ===
- Arizona: Charlie Shoemaker, Bart Zeller
- Boston College:
- Minnesota: Jim Rantz
- North Carolina:
- Northern Colorado: Cisco Carlos
- Oklahoma State: Frank Linzy, Don Wallace
- Southern California: Mike Gillespie, Bill Heath, Marcel Lachemann, Tom Satriano, Ron Stillwell
- St. John's: Larry Bearnarth

=== Tournament Notes ===
Jim Wixson throws the second no-hitter in College World Series history.
