= 1959 Colorado State College Bears baseball team =

College baseball team

1959 Colorado State College Bears baseball

Rocky Mountain Conference champions District VII champions

College World Series, T-5th
- Conference: Rocky Mountain Conference
- CB: No. 8
- Record: 24–7 (10–1 RMC)
- Head coach: Pete Butler (17th season)
- Assistant coach: Tom Cooper (2nd season)
- Home stadium: Jackson Field

1959 Rocky Mountain Conference baseball standings
	Conf.				Overall
Team	W		L	PCT	W		L	PCT
No. 8 Colorado State College ‍†‍‍^{y}	10	–	1	.909	24	–	7	.774
Adams State ‍‍‍	9	–	5	.643		–		–
Western State ‍‍‍	7	–	5	.583		–		–
Colorado Mines ‍‍‍	6	–	9	.400	9	–	12	.429
Colorado College ‍‍‍	1	–	13	.071	2	–	14	.125
† – Conference champion y – Invited to the College World Series; As of June 30, 1959; Rankings from Collegiate Baseball

The 1959 Colorado State College Bears baseball team represented Colorado State College in the 1959 NCAA University Division baseball season. The Bears played their home games at Jackson Field. The team was coached by Pete Butler in his 17th year at Colorado State College.

The Bears won the District VII playoff to advanced to the College World Series, where they were defeated by the Clemson Tigers.

== Roster ==
1959 Colorado State College Bears baseball team
Players
Coaches

#	Pos.	Name	B/T	Height	Weight	Year	Home town
	OF	Floyd Acre	/	—	—
	C	Duane Banks	/	—	—	Fr
	P	Frank Carbajal	/	—	—
	OF	Paul Chamberlain	/	—	—
		Joe Duca	/	—	—
		Ron English	/	—	—
	C	John Groninger	/	—	—
	P	Don Herrick	/	—	—
	OF	Norm Idleberg	/	—	—
		Ken Kempf	/	—	—
	INF	John Koehler	/	—	—
		Blaine McVicker	/	—	—
	OF	Wayne Merritt	/	—	—
	INF	Gene Neelly	/	—	—
		Don Panion	/	—	—
	INF	Joe Peck	/	—	—
	INF	Bob Preisendorf	/	—	—
	INF	Carl Rohnke	/	—	—
		Bill Trimble	/	—	—
		Larry Turner	/	—	—

Head coach

Pete Butler

Assistant coach(es)

Tom Cooper

Legend

- (C) Team captain
- (S) Suspended
- (I) Ineligible
- Injured
- Current redshirt

== Schedule ==
1959 Colorado State College Bears baseball game log
Regular season
March (3–2)

#	Date	Opponent	Site/stadium	Score	Overall record	RMC record
1	March 18	at New Mexico	Lobo Field • Albuquerque, New Mexico	8–6	1–0	–
2	March 20	at Arizona	UA Field • Tucson, Arizona	4–6	1–1	–
3	March 21	at Arizona	UA Field • Tucson, Arizona	6–2	2–1	–
4	March 21	at Arizona	UA Field • Tucson, Arizona	1–5	2–2	–
5	March 23	at New Mexico	Lobo Field • Albuquerque, New Mexico	20–8	3–2	–

April (11–0)

#	Date	Opponent	Site/stadium	Score	Overall record	RMC record
6	April 2	South Dakota State	Jackson Field • Greeley, Colorado	12–3	4–2	–
7	April 4	Air Force	Jackson Field • Greeley, Colorado	15–1	5–2	–
8	April	Colorado Mines	Jackson Field • Greeley, Colorado	12–6	6–2	1–0
9	April 11	at Colorado State	Colorado Field • Fort Collins, Colorado	4–0	7–2	1–0
10	April 17	at Wyoming	Unknown • Laramie, Wyoming	8–4	8–2	1–0
11	April 18	Wyoming	Jackson Field • Greeley, Colorado	7–0	9–2	1–0
12	April 21	Denver	Jackson Field • Greeley, Colorado	7–0	10–2	1–0
13	April 24	at Colorado College	Stewart Field • Colorado Springs, Colorado	22–14	11–2	2–0
14	April 25	at Colorado College	Stewart Field • Colorado Springs, Colorado	29–13	12–2	3–0
15	April 28	Colorado Mines	Jackson Field • Greeley, Colorado	13–1	13–2	4–0
16	April 29	Colorado Mines	Jackson Field • Greeley, Colorado	5–1	14–2	5–0

May (8–2)

#	Date	Opponent	Site/stadium	Score	Overall record	RMC record
17	May 1	at Western State	Unknown • Gunnison, Colorado	5–8	14–3	5–1
18	May 2	at Western State	Unknown • Gunnison, Colorado	9–0	15–3	6–1
19	May 5	Regis	Jackson Field • Greeley, Colorado	3–2	16–3	6–1
20	May 8	Adams State	Jackson Field • Greeley, Colorado	4–2	17–3	7–1
21	May 9	Adams State	Jackson Field • Greeley, Colorado	11–6	18–3	8–1
22	May 12	at Denver	Unknown • Denver, Colorado	17–0	19–3	8–1
23	May	Colorado State	Jackson Field • Greeley, Colorado	16–1	20–3	8–1
24	May 15	Colorado College	Jackson Field • Greeley, Colorado	15–3	21–3	9–1
25	May 16	Colorado College	Jackson Field • Greeley, Colorado	13–1	22–3	10–1
26	May 19	Regis	Jackson Field • Greeley, Colorado	6–9	22–4	10–1

Postseason
District VII Playoff (2–1)

#	Date	Opponent	Site/stadium	Score	Overall record	RMC record
27	May 30	Utah	Jackson Field • Greeley, Colorado	17–8	23–4	10–1
28	May 31	Utah	Jackson Field • Greeley, Colorado	8–13	23–5	10–1
29	June 1	Utah	Jackson Field • Greeley, Colorado	12–8	24–5	10–1

College World Series (0–2)

#	Date	Opponent	Site/stadium	Score	Overall record	RMC record
30	June 13	vs Fresno State	Omaha Municipal Stadium • Omaha, Nebraska	5–6	24–6	10–1
31	June 14	vs Clemson	Omaha Municipal Stadium • Omaha, Nebraska	1–7	24–7	10–1

== Awards and honors ==
Don Herrick

- All-Rocky Mountain Conference Team
- Third Team All-American American Baseball Coaches Association

Joe Peck

- All-Rocky Mountain Conference Team

Carl Rohnke

- All-Rocky Mountain Conference Team

Paul Chamberlain

- All-Rocky Mountain Conference Team

Frank Carbajal

- All-Rocky Mountain Conference Team

Duane Banks

- All-Rocky Mountain Conference Team

John Koehler

- All-Rocky Mountain Conference Team

Floyd Acre

- All-Rocky Mountain Conference Team
