= 1960 Oklahoma State Cowboys baseball team =

American baseball team

1960 Oklahoma State Cowboys baseball

Big Eight champions District V champions

College World Series, 3rd
- Conference: Big Eight Conference
- CB: No. 4
- Record: 17–7 (12–4 Big 8)
- Head coach: Toby Greene (17th season)

1960 Big Eight Conference baseball standings
	Conf.				Overall
Team	W		L	PCT	W		L	PCT
No. 4 Oklahoma State ‍†‍‍^{y}	12	–	4	.750	17	–	7	.708
Iowa State ‍‍‍	12	–	6	.667	14	–	9	.609
Oklahoma ‍‍‍	12	–	7	.632	13	–	10	.565
Missouri ‍‍‍	9	–	6	.600	12	–	9	.571
Colorado ‍‍‍	7	–	9	.438	10	–	12	.455
Kansas ‍‍‍	7	–	11	.389	11	–	13	.458
Nebraska ‍‍‍	6	–	11	.353	10	–	13	.435
Kansas State ‍‍‍	3	–	14	.176	5	–	18	.217
† – Conference champion y – Invited to the NCAA tournament As of June 30, 1960; Rankings from Collegiate Baseball

The 1960 Oklahoma State Cowboys baseball team represented the Oklahoma State University in the 1960 NCAA University Division baseball season. The team was coached by Toby Greene in his 17th year at Oklahoma State.

The Cowboys were named the District V champions and advanced to the College World Series, where they were defeated by the Minnesota Golden Gophers.

== Roster ==
1960 Oklahoma State Cowboys baseball team
Players
Coaches

#	Pos.	Name	B/T	Height	Weight	Year	Home town
		Bruce Andrew	/	—	—
		Robert Andrew	/	—	—
		Ben Bancroft	/	—	—
		Don Berry	/	—	—
		Don Blakey	/	—	—
		Ray Bond	/	—	—
		John Brown	/	—	—
		Bill Burgess	/	—	—
	INF	Dale DeHart	/	—	—
	OF	Jim Dobson	/	—	—
		Bob Hennkens	/	—	—
		Bill Ketchum	/	—	—
		Bob McDowell	/	—	—
	INF	Grayson Mersch	/	—	—
		Mike Mulvihill	/	—	—
	P	George Scott	/	—	—
	P	Dick Soergel	/	—	—
		Don Soergel	/	—	—
		J. D. Sorenson	/	—	—
		Don Wallace	/	—	—
	RHP	Jim Wixson	/R	—	—

Head coach

Toby Greene

Assistant coach(es)

Legend

- (C) Team captain
- (S) Suspended
- (I) Ineligible
- Injured
- Current redshirt

Roster
Last update: February 13, 2021

== Schedule ==
1960 Oklahoma State Cowboys baseball game log
Regular season
March (2–0)

#	Date	Opponent	Site/stadium	Score	Overall record	Big 8 record
1	March 26	at Rice	Rice Baseball Field • Houston, Texas	10–1	1–0	–
2	March 27	at Rice	Rice Baseball Field • Houston, Texas	4–2	2–0	–

April (8–3)

#	Date	Opponent	Site/stadium	Score	Overall record	Big 8 record
3	April 1	at Houston	Buffalo Stadium • Houston, Texas	0–4	2–1	–
4	April 2	at Houston	Buffalo Stadium • Houston, Texas	1–0	3–1	–
5	April 8	at Missouri	Simmons Field • Columbia, Missouri	4–3	4–1	1–0
6	April 9	at Missouri	Simmons Field • Columbia, Missouri	2–1	5–1	2–0
7	April 9	at Missouri	Simmons Field • Columbia, Missouri	2–0	6–1	3–0
8	April 15	at Kansas State	Frank Myers Field • Manhattan, Kansas	8–1	7–1	4–0
9	April 15	at Kansas State	Frank Myers Field • Manhattan, Kansas	9–2	8–1	5–0
10	April 16	at Kansas State	Frank Myers Field • Manhattan, Kansas	11–2	9–1	6–0
11	April 25	Oklahoma	Unknown • Stillwater, Oklahoma	13–3	10–1	7–0
12	April 25	Oklahoma	Unknown • Stillwater, Oklahoma	7–9	10–2	7–1
13	April 26	Oklahoma	Unknown • Stillwater, Oklahoma	0–4	10–3	7–2

May (5–2)

#	Date	Opponent	Site/stadium	Score	Overall record	Big 8 record
14	May 6	Nebraska	Unknown • Stillwater, Oklahoma	2–0	11–3	8–2
15	May 7	Nebraska	Unknown • Stillwater, Oklahoma	7–2	12–3	9–2
16	May 13	Colorado	Unknown • Stillwater, Oklahoma	3–4	12–4	9–3
17	May 13	Colorado	Unknown • Stillwater, Oklahoma	13–2	13–4	10–3
18	May 14	Colorado	Unknown • Stillwater, Oklahoma	1–0	14–4	11–3
19	May 20	at Iowa State	Unknown • Ames, Iowa	0–4	14–5	11–4
20	May 21	at Iowa State	Unknown • Ames, Iowa	10–5	15–5	12–4

Postseason
College World Series (2–2)

#	Date	Opponent	Site/stadium	Score	Overall record	Big 8 record
21	June 13	vs Arizona	Omaha Municipal Stadium • Omaha, Nebraska	1–2	15–6	12–4
22	June 15	vs North Carolina	Omaha Municipal Stadium • Omaha, Nebraska	7–0	16–6	12–4
23	June 17	vs Boston College	Omaha Municipal Stadium • Omaha, Nebraska	1–0	17–6	12–4
24	June 18	vs Minnesota	Omaha Municipal Stadium • Omaha, Nebraska	1–3	17–7	12–4

== Awards and honors ==
Dale DeHart

- All-Big Eight Conference

Jim Dobson

- All-Big Eight Conference

Grayson Mersch

- All-Big Eight Conference

Dick Soergel

- First Team All-American American Baseball Coaches Association
- All-Big Eight Conference
