= 1959 NCAA University Division baseball season =

Baseball season

NCAA tournament

College World Series
- Champions: Oklahoma State (1st title)
- Runners-up: Arizona (5th CWS Appearance)
- Winning coach: Toby Greene (1st title)
- MOP: Jim Dobson (Oklahoma State)

Seasons
- ← 1958 1960 →

The 1959 NCAA University Division baseball season, play of college baseball in the United States organized by the National Collegiate Athletic Association (NCAA) began in the spring of 1959. The season progressed through the regular season and concluded with the 1959 College World Series. The College World Series, held for the thirteenth time in 1959, consisted of one team from each of eight geographical districts and was held in Omaha, Nebraska at Johnny Rosenblatt Stadium as a double-elimination tournament. Oklahoma State claimed the championship.

== Conference winners ==
This is a partial list of conference champions from the 1959 season. Each of the eight geographical districts chose, by various methods, the team that would represent them in the NCAA tournament. 10 teams earned automatic bids by winning their conference championship while 12 teams earned at-large selections.

Conference	Regular season winner	Tournament	Tournament champion
Atlantic Coast Conference	Clemson/North Carolina/Wake Forest	1959 Atlantic Coast Conference baseball playoffs	Clemson
Big Eight Conference	Oklahoma State	no tournament	
Big Ten Conference	Minnesota	no tournament	
CIBA	Southern California	no tournament	
EIBL	Navy	no tournament	
Mid-American Conference	Ohio/Western Michigan	no tournament	
Pacific Coast Conference	Washington	no tournament	
Rocky Mountain Conference	Colorado State College	no tournament	
Southeastern Conference	Ole Miss	no tournament	
Southern Conference	George Washington	no tournament	
Southwest Conference	Texas A&M	no tournament	
Yankee Conference	Connecticut	no tournament	

== Conference standings ==
The following is an incomplete list of conference standings:

1959 Atlantic Coast Conference baseball standings
	Conf.				Overall
Team	W		L	PCT	W		L	PCT
No. 5 Clemson ‍†‍‡‍^{y}	9	–	5	.643	24	–	8	.750
North Carolina ‍†‍‍	9	–	5	.643	17	–	7	.708
Wake Forest ‍†‍‍	9	–	5	.643	13	–	8	.619
Maryland ‍‍‍	7	–	6	.538	11	–	6	.647
Virginia ‍‍‍	6	–	8	.429	10	–	9	.526
South Carolina ‍‍‍	5	–	8	.385	11	–	12	.478
Duke ‍‍‍	5	–	9	.357	9	–	16	.360
NC State ‍‍‍	5	–	9	.357	8	–	12	.400
† – Conference champion ‡ – Playoff champion y – Invited to the NCAA tournament As of June 30, 1959; Rankings from Collegiate Baseball

1959 Mid-American Conference baseball standings
	Conf.						Overall
Team	W		L		T	PCT	W		L		T	PCT
No. 6 Western Michigan ‍†‍‍^{y}	8	–	2	–	0	.800	24	–	9	–	0	.727
Ohio ‍†‍‍	8	–	2	–	0	.800	18	–	4	–	0	.818
Kent State ‍‍‍	8	–	3	–	0	.727	16	–	7	–	1	.688
Bowling Green ‍‍‍	6	–	6	–	0	.500	12	–	6	–	0	.667
Marshall ‍‍‍	4	–	6	–	0	.400	12	–	10	–	0	.545
Miami (OH) ‍‍‍	4	–	7	–	0	.364	10	–	9	–	1	.525
Toledo ‍‍‍	0	–	12	–	0	.000	2	–	16	–	0	.111
† – Conference champion y – Invited to the NCAA tournament As of June 30, 1959; Rankings from Collegiate Baseball

1959 Big Eight Conference baseball standings
	Conf.				Overall
Team	W		L	PCT	W		L	PCT
No. 1 Oklahoma State ‍†‍‍^{y}	17	–	3	.850	27	–	5	.844
Nebraska ‍‍‍	11	–	4	.733	15	–	8	.652
Iowa State ‍‍‍	10	–	8	.556	11	–	12	.478
Colorado ‍‍‍	7	–	8	.467	11	–	10	.524
Oklahoma ‍‍‍	7	–	10	.412	12	–	11	.522
Kansas ‍‍‍	5	–	11	.313	9	–	11	.450
Kansas State ‍‍‍	4	–	9	.308	4	–	9	.308
Missouri ‍‍‍	3	–	11	.214	9	–	11	.450
† – Conference champion y – Invited to the NCAA tournament As of June 30, 1959; Rankings from Collegiate Baseball

1959 Rocky Mountain Conference baseball standings
	Conf.				Overall
Team	W		L	PCT	W		L	PCT
No. 8 Colorado State College ‍†‍‍^{y}	10	–	1	.909	24	–	7	.774
Adams State ‍‍‍	9	–	5	.643		–		–
Western State ‍‍‍	7	–	5	.583		–		–
Colorado Mines ‍‍‍	6	–	9	.400	9	–	12	.429
Colorado College ‍‍‍	1	–	13	.071	2	–	14	.125
† – Conference champion y – Invited to the College World Series; As of June 30, 1959; Rankings from Collegiate Baseball

1959 California Collegiate Athletic Association baseball standings
	Conf.						Overall
Team	W		L		T	PCT	W		L		T	PCT
No. 3 Fresno State ‍†‍‍^{y}	11	–	4	–	0	.733	41	–	13	–	0	.759
San Diego State ‍‍‍	10	–	5	–	0	.667	28	–	9	–	0	.757
Cal State Los Angeles ‍‍‍	9	–	6	–	0	.600	24	–	18	–	2	.568
Cal Poly ‍‍‍	8	–	7	–	0	.533	17	–	18	–	0	.486
Long Beach State ‍‍‍	5	–	10	–	0	.333	16	–	19	–	0	.457
UC Santa Barbara ‍‍‍	2	–	13	–	0	.133	5	–	19	–	0	.208
† – Conference champion y – Invited to the College World Series; As of June 30, 1959; Rankings from Collegiate Baseball

1959 Yankee Conference baseball standings
	Conf.				Overall
Team	W		L	PCT	W		L	PCT
No. 7 Connecticut ‍†‍‍^{y}	10	–	0	1.000	20	–	3	.870
Maine ‍‍‍	7	–	3	.700	12	–	8	.600
UMass ‍‍‍	4	–	5	.444	10	–	6	.625
Vermont ‍‍‍	4	–	6	.400	15	–	11	.577
New Hampshire ‍‍‍	3	–	7	.300	7	–	11	.389
Rhode Island ‍‍‍	1	–	8	.111	2	–	11	.154
† – Conference champion y – Invited to the NCAA tournament As of June 30, 1959; Rankings from Collegiate Baseball

== College World Series ==
The 1959 season marked the thirteenth NCAA baseball tournament, which culminated with the eight team College World Series. The College World Series was held in Omaha, Nebraska. The eight teams played a double-elimination format, with Oklahoma State claiming their second championship with a 5–3 win over Arizona in the final.

Upper round 1
Oklahoma State	10
Western Michigan	2
Penn State	5
Connecticut	3
Arizona	3^{12}
Clemson	2
Fresno State	6
Colorado State College	5

Upper round 2
Oklahoma State	8
Penn State	6
Arizona	5
Fresno State	1
Lower round 1
Clemson	7
Colorado State College	1
Western Michigan	14
Connecticut	6

Upper final
Oklahoma State	3
Arizona	5
Lower round 2
Penn State	7
Clemson	0
Fresno State	7
Western Michigan	2

Semifinals
Oklahoma State	4
Penn State	3
Fresno State	2
Arizona	0

Preliminary final
Oklahoma State	4
Fresno State	0

Final
Oklahoma State	5
Arizona	3
