= Lexington Red Sox =

Minor league baseball team

Lexington Sox
- 1956–1958; Lexington, Nebraska

Minor league affiliations
- Class: Class D (1956–1958)
- League: Nebraska State League (1956–1958)

Major league affiliations
- Team: Boston Red Sox (1956–1958)

Minor league titles
- League titles (1): 1956

Team data
- Name: Lexington Red Sox (1956–1959)
- Ballpark: Dawson County Fairgrounds Park (1956–1958)

The Lexington Red Sox were a minor league baseball team, based in Lexington, Nebraska. From 1956 to 1958, the Red Sox played exclusively as members of the short–season Class D level Nebraska State League, winning the 1956 league championship. The Red Sox played as a minor league affiliate of the Boston Red Sox, hosting home minor league games at the Dawson County Fairgrounds Park.

== History ==
Based in Lexington, Nebraska, and Dawson County, Nebraska, the Lexington Red Sox were a Class D level affiliate of the Boston Red Sox that played in the Nebraska State League from 1956 to 1958. The Lexington Red Sox played their home games at the Dawson County Fairgrounds Park. Lexington won the Nebraska State League Championship in 1956. The team disbanded after the 1958 season when the league reduced from eight teams to six teams, with Lexington and the Superior Senators disbanding.

The 1956 Lexington Red Sox captured the Nebraska State League Championship in their first season. Opening day drew 1,900 fans, as Lexington defeated the Holdrege White Sox 10–7. The Lexington Red Sox ended the 1956 season with a record of 41–22, placing first in the league standings, playing the season under manager Danny Doyle. The Red Sox finished 3.0 games ahead of the second place Grand Island Athletics in the final standings, as the league had no playoffs. The Red Sox drew 28,393 for the season, an average 901, to Dawson County Fairgrounds Park.

The Lexington Red Sox narrowly missed defending their championship in 1957, as the team finished in a second place tie, just 0.5 behind. Lexington finished with a 33–23 record, the same record as the Holdrege White Sox, to finish in a tie for second place. The champion Grand Island Athletics place first with a record of 33–22. Jack Kaiser was the Lexington Manager in 1957. Season attendance was 24,218, an average of 865 per game.

In their final season, the 1958 Lexington Red Sox placed fifth in the eight–team Nebraska State League. Lexington finished with a 30–33 record, playing again under manager Jack Kaiser. In their final season at Dawson County Fairgrounds Park, the Red Sox had season attendance of 2,838, an average of 408 per home game. Lexington folded after the 1958 season, as the Nebraska State League reduced to six teams.

Lexington, Nebraska has not hosted another minor league team.

== The ballpark ==
The Lexington Red Sox played their minor league home games at the Dawson County Fairgrounds Park. The ball field had a dirt infield and utilized the existing raceway grandstands at the fairgrounds to accommodate fans. Today, the grandstands are still in use at the Dawson County Fairgrounds for the Dawson County Raceway. The location is 1000 Plum Creek Parkway in Lexington, Nebraska.

== Timeline ==
Year(s)	# Yrs.	Team	Level	League	Affiliate	Ballpark
1956–1958	3	Lexington Red Sox	Class D	Nebraska State League	Boston Red Sox	Dawson County Fairgrounds Park

== Year–by–year records ==
Year	Record	Finish	Manager	Playoffs
1956	41–22	1st	Danny Doyle	League champions
1957	33–23	3rd	Jack Kaiser	No playoffs held
1958	30–33	5th	Jack Kaiser	No playoffs held

== Notable alumni ==
- Danny Doyle (1956, manager)
- Jack Kaiser (1957–1958, manager)
- Bill Spanswick (1958)

== See also ==
- Lexington Red Sox players
