= 1959 Fresno State Bulldogs baseball team =

American college baseball season

1959 Fresno State Bulldogs baseball

CCAA champions District VIII champions

College World Series, 3rd
- Conference: California Collegiate Athletic Association
- Record: 41–13 (11–4 CCAA)
- Head coach: Pete Beiden (12th season)
- Captain: Jerry White
- Home stadium: John Euless Ballpark

1959 California Collegiate Athletic Association baseball standings
	Conf.						Overall
Team	W		L		T	PCT	W		L		T	PCT
No. 3 Fresno State ‍†‍‍^{y}	11	–	4	–	0	.733	41	–	13	–	0	.759
San Diego State ‍‍‍	10	–	5	–	0	.667	28	–	9	–	0	.757
Cal State Los Angeles ‍‍‍	9	–	6	–	0	.600	24	–	18	–	2	.568
Cal Poly ‍‍‍	8	–	7	–	0	.533	17	–	18	–	0	.486
Long Beach State ‍‍‍	5	–	10	–	0	.333	16	–	19	–	0	.457
UC Santa Barbara ‍‍‍	2	–	13	–	0	.133	5	–	19	–	0	.208
† – Conference champion y – Invited to the College World Series; As of June 30, 1959; Rankings from Collegiate Baseball

The 1959 Fresno State Bulldogs baseball team represented Fresno State College in the 1959 NCAA University Division baseball season. The Bulldogs played their home games at John Euless Ballpark. The team was coached by Pete Beiden in his 12th year as head coach at Fresno State.

The Bulldogs won the District VIII playoff to advance to the College World Series, where they were defeated by the Oklahoma State Cowboys.

== Roster ==
1959 Fresno State Bulldogs baseball team
Players
Coaches

#	Pos.	Name	B/T	Height	Weight	Year	Home town
	RHP	Mountie Bedford	/R	—	—	Sr
26		Dave Biggers	/	—	—
	OF	Stan Busch	/	—	—
	OF	Merv Carter	L/	—	—	Sr
	RHP	Harvey Casey	R/R	6 ft 1 in (1.85 m)	190 lb (86 kg)		Crawfordsville, Indiana
	RHP	Dick Deopker	R/R	6 ft 0 in (1.83 m)	175 lb (79 kg)	Sr	Annaheim, Saskatchewan
	C	Joe Fischer	/	—	—	So	Visalia, California
	C	Jim Garrett	R/R	—	—	Sr
		Augie Garrido	/	—	—	So
	LHP	Lee Gregory	L/L	6 ft 1 in (1.85 m)	180 lb (82 kg)	Jr	Bakersfield, California
	INF	Ted Hiltel	/	—	—
	P	Wayne Hironaka	/	—	—
	INF	Jim Lester	/	—	—
	OF	Mike Lillard	/	—	—
	INF	Mike Mathieson	L/	—	—
	INF	Dorman Martin	/	—	—
	INF	Marty Mazzoni	R/	—	—	So
	OF	L. H. McDaniels	/	—	—
	INF	Lee Murphy	R/	—	—
	OF	Dave Peeler	L/	—	—
	P	Dick Rose	/	—	—
	P	Bob Scholz	/	—	—
	OF	Tommy Thompson	L/R	5 ft 11 in (1.8 m)	175 lb (79 kg)	Jr	Lincoln, Illinois
	P	Ed Vegely	/	—	—
	INF	Jerry White (C)	R/R	—	—	Sr	Oxnard, California
	INF	Odell Youngblood	/	—	—

Head coach

Pete Beiden

Assistant coach(es)

Legend

- (C) Team captain
- (S) Suspended
- (I) Ineligible
- Injured
- Current redshirt

Roster
Last update: October 25, 2021

== Schedule ==
1959 Fresno State Bulldogs baseball game log
Regular season
February (0–1)

#	Date	Opponent	Site/stadium	Score	Overall record	CCAA record
1	February 28	at California	Edwards Field • Berkeley, California	1–2	0–1	–

March (15–3)

#	Date	Opponent	Site/stadium	Score	Overall record	CCAA record
2	March 6	at Camp Pendleton	Unknown • Oceanside, California	4–0	1–1	–
3	March 7	at Camp Pendleton	Unknown • Oceanside, California	1–0	2–1	–
4	March 7	at Camp Pendleton	Unknown • Oceanside, California	13–0	3–1	–
5	March 13	California	John Euless Ballpark • Fresno, California	4–2	4–1	–
6	March 14	California	John Euless Ballpark • Fresno, California	10–8	5–1	–
7	March 16	San Jose State	John Euless Ballpark • Fresno, California	1–4	5–2	–
8	March 16	San Jose State	John Euless Ballpark • Fresno, California	9–8	6–2	–
9	March 20	UCLA	John Euless Ballpark • Fresno, California	8–0	7–2	–
10	March 21	UCLA	John Euless Ballpark • Fresno, California	9–10	7–3	–
11	March 23	vs Southern California	Unknown • San Diego, California	2–6	7–4	–
12	March 24	vs Utah State	Unknown • San Diego, California	7–0	8–4	–
13	March 25	vs Stanford	Unknown • San Diego, California	2–1	9–4	–
14	March 25	vs San Diego Marines	Unknown • San Diego, California	12–8	10–4	–
15	March 26	vs San Diego State	Unknown • San Diego, California	10–9	11–4	–
16	March 26	vs San Diego State	Unknown • San Diego, California	10–6	12–4	–
17	March 27	Oregon	John Euless Ballpark • Fresno, California	10–7	13–4	–
18	March 28	Oregon	John Euless Ballpark • Fresno, California	3–2	14–4	–
19	March 31	at Sacramento State	Hornet Field • Sacramento, California	10–7	15–4	–
20	March 31	at Sacramento State	Hornet Field • Sacramento, California	9–0	16–4	–

April (11–4)

#	Date	Opponent	Site/stadium	Score	Overall record	CCAA record
21	April 3	San Diego State	John Euless Ballpark • Fresno, California	3–5	16–5	0–1
22	April 4	Long Beach State	John Euless Ballpark • Fresno, California	2–0	17–5	1–1
23	April 4	Long Beach State	John Euless Ballpark • Fresno, California	9–3	18–5	2–1
24	April 8	Camp Pendleton	John Euless Ballpark • Fresno, California	10–9	19–5	2–1
25	April 8	Camp Pendleton	John Euless Ballpark • Fresno, California	3–4	19–6	2–1
26	April 10	at Long Beach State	Whaley Park • Long Beach, California	14–4	20–6	3–1
27	April 11	at San Diego State	Unknown • San Diego, California	6–4	21–6	4–1
28	April 11	at San Diego State	Unknown • San Diego, California	4–8	21–7	4–2
29	April 14	at San Jose State	Unknown • San Jose, California	6–0	22–7	4–2
30	April 14	at San Jose State	Unknown • San Jose, California	1–0	23–7	4–2
31	April 17	Cal Poly	John Euless Ballpark • Fresno, California	8–2	24–7	5–2
32	April 17	Cal Poly	John Euless Ballpark • Fresno, California	15–18	24–8	5–3
33	April 20	San Jose State	John Euless Ballpark • Fresno, California	11–8	25–8	5–3
34	April 20	San Jose State	John Euless Ballpark • Fresno, California	13–7	26–8	5–3
35	April 24	at Cal Poly	Unknown • San Luis Obispo, California	23–1	27–8	6–3

May (7–1)

#	Date	Opponent	Site/stadium	Score	Overall record	CCAA record
36	May 1	UC Santa Barbara	John Euless Ballpark • Fresno, California	6–4	28–8	7–3
37	May 2	Cal State Los Angeles	John Euless Ballpark • Fresno, California	10–1	29–8	8–3
38	May 2	Cal State Los Angeles	John Euless Ballpark • Fresno, California	6–1	30–8	9–3
39	May 5	Sacramento State	John Euless Ballpark • Fresno, California	9–5	31–8	9–3
40	May 5	Sacramento State	John Euless Ballpark • Fresno, California	8–4	32–8	9–3
41	May 8	at Cal State Los Angeles	Unknown • Los Angeles, California	2–1	33–8	10–3
42	May 9	at UC Santa Barbara	Unknown • Santa Barbara, California	4–11	34–9	10–4
43	May 9	at UC Santa Barbara	Unknown • Santa Barbara, California	13–9	35–9	11–4

Postseason
District VIII Playoff (4–1)

#	Date	Opponent	Site/stadium	Score	Overall record	CCAA record
45	May	Santa Clara	John Euless Ballpark • Fresno, California	23–11	–	11–4
46	May	Santa Clara	John Euless Ballpark • Fresno, California	15–3	–	11–4
47	May	at Washington	Old Graves Field • Seattle, Washington	3–2	–	11–4
48	May	at Washington	Old Graves Field • Seattle, Washington	4–5	–	11–4
49	May	at Washington	Old Graves Field • Seattle, Washington	10–5	–	11–4

College World Series (3–2)

#	Date	Opponent	Site/stadium	Score	Overall record	CCAA record
50	June 13	vs Colorado State College	Omaha Municipal Stadium • Omaha, Nebraska	6–5	39–11	11–4
51	June 14	vs Arizona	Omaha Municipal Stadium • Omaha, Nebraska	1–5	39–12	11–4
52	June 15	vs Western Michigan	Omaha Municipal Stadium • Omaha, Nebraska	7–2	40–12	11–4
53	June 16	vs Arizona	Omaha Municipal Stadium • Omaha, Nebraska	2–0	41–12	11–4
54	June 16	vs Oklahoma State	Omaha Municipal Stadium • Omaha, Nebraska	0–4	41–13	11–4

== Awards and honors ==
Augie Garrido

- First Team All-District VIII

Lee Gregory

- First Team All-CCAA
- First Team All-District VIII

Jim Lester

- First Team All-CCAA

Mike Mathiesen

- First Team All-CCAA

Jerry White

- First Team All-CCAA
