= 1959 Western Michigan Broncos baseball team =

Baseball team of Western Michigan University in 1959

1959 Western Michigan Broncos baseball

Mid-American Conference champions District IV champions

College World Series, T-5th
- Conference: Mid-American Conference
- Record: 24–9 (8–2 MAC)
- Head coach: Charlie Maher (21st season)
- Assistant coach: Don Edwards (2nd season)
- Home stadium: Hyames Field

1959 Mid-American Conference baseball standings
	Conf.						Overall
Team	W		L		T	PCT	W		L		T	PCT
No. 6 Western Michigan ‍†‍‍^{y}	8	–	2	–	0	.800	24	–	9	–	0	.727
Ohio ‍†‍‍	8	–	2	–	0	.800	18	–	4	–	0	.818
Kent State ‍‍‍	8	–	3	–	0	.727	16	–	7	–	1	.688
Bowling Green ‍‍‍	6	–	6	–	0	.500	12	–	6	–	0	.667
Marshall ‍‍‍	4	–	6	–	0	.400	12	–	10	–	0	.545
Miami (OH) ‍‍‍	4	–	7	–	0	.364	10	–	9	–	1	.525
Toledo ‍‍‍	0	–	12	–	0	.000	2	–	16	–	0	.111
† – Conference champion y – Invited to the NCAA tournament As of June 30, 1959; Rankings from Collegiate Baseball

The 1959 Western Michigan Broncos baseball team represented Western Michigan University in the 1959 NCAA University Division baseball season. The Broncos played their home games at Hyames Field. The team was coached by Charlie Maher in his 21st year at Western Michigan.

The Broncos won the District IV playoff to advanced to the College World Series, where they were defeated by the Fresno State Bulldogs.

== Roster ==
1959 Western Michigan Broncos baseball team
Players
Coaches

#	Pos.	Name	B/T	Height	Weight	Year	Home town
		Phil Bareis	/	—	—
		Larry Belanger	/	—	—
		Larry Buchanan	/	—	—
		Al Erickson	/	—	—
		Robert Flath	/	—	—
		Len Grabowski	/	—	—
		Jim Greenwood	/	—	—
		Joe Gresser	/	—	—
		Robert Hamet	/	—	—
		Jim Hock	/	—	—
		Rollie Hopgood	/	—	—
		Jess Kuafman	/	—	—
		Ray Larned	/	—	—
		Craig Morris	/	—	—
		William O	/	—	—
		Frank Quilici	/	—	—
		Larry Randall	/	—	—
		Ken Scodeller	/	—	—
		Jerry Socha	/	—	—
		Bill Topp	/	—	—
		Ron White	/	—	—
		Tom Wood	/	—	—

Head coach

Charlie Maher

Assistant coach(es)

Don Edwards

Legend

- (C) Team captain
- (S) Suspended
- (I) Ineligible
- Injured
- Current redshirt

== Schedule ==
1959 Western Michigan Broncos baseball game log
Regular season
March (1–1)

#	Date	Opponent	Site/stadium	Score	Overall record	MAC record
1	March 30	vs Illinois	Seminole Field • Tallahassee, Florida	1–4	0–1	–
2	March 31	at Florida State	Seminole Field • Tallahassee, Florida	3–2	1–1	–

April (11–1)

#	Date	Opponent	Site/stadium	Score	Overall record	MAC record
3	April 1	vs Michigan State	Seminole Field • Tallahassee, Florida	9–1	2–1	–
4	April 2	vs Michigan	Seminole Field • Tallahassee, Florida	7–6	3–1	–
5	April 2	vs Michigan	Seminole Field • Tallahassee, Florida	9–7	4–1	–
6	April 3	at Florida State	Seminole Field • Tallahassee, Florida	0–2	4–2	–
7	April 4	vs Duke	Seminole Field • Tallahassee, Florida	5–3	5–2	–
8	April 13	Iowa	Hyames Field • Kalamazoo, Michigan	6–5	6–2	–
9	April 14	Iowa	Hyames Field • Kalamazoo, Michigan	6–2	7–2	–
10	April 17	at Bowling Green	Unknown • Bowling Green, Ohio	9–1	8–2	1–0
11	April 18	at Bowling Green	Unknown • Bowling Green, Ohio	6–1	9–2	2–0
12	April 21	Michigan State	Hyames Field • Kalamazoo, Michigan	6–1	10–2	2–0
13	April 24	at Toledo	Unknown • Toledo, Ohio	11–6	11–2	3–0
14	April 25	at Toledo	Unknown • Toledo, Ohio	18–13	12–2	4–0

May (8–3)

#	Date	Opponent	Site/stadium	Score	Overall record	MAC record
15	May 1	Miami (OH)	Hyames Field • Kalamazoo, Michigan	7–0	13–2	5–0
16	May 2	Miami (OH)	Hyames Field • Kalamazoo, Michigan	17–1	14–2	6–0
17	May 4	at Wisconsin	Guy Lowman Field • Madison, Wisconsin	3–5	14–3	6–0
18	May 5	at Wisconsin	Guy Lowman Field • Madison, Wisconsin	8–6	15–3	6–0
19	May 8	Kent State	Hyames Field • Kalamazoo, Michigan	10–0	16–3	7–0
20	May 9	Kent State	Hyames Field • Kalamazoo, Michigan	2–12	16–4	7–1
21	May 12	at Michigan	Ray Fisher Stadium • Ann Arbor, Michigan	7–1	17–4	7–1
22	May 16	Notre Dame	Hyames Field • Kalamazoo, Michigan	3–0	18–4	7–1
23	May 22	Ohio	Hyames Field • Kalamazoo, Michigan	3–7	18–5	7–2
24	May 26	Ohio	Hyames Field • Kalamazoo, Michigan	4–3	19–5	8–2

Postseason
District IV Playoff (4–1)

#	Date	Opponent	Site/stadium	Score	Overall record	MAC record
25	May 28	vs Minnesota	Cartier Field • Notre Dame, Indiana	4–6	19–6	8–2
26	May 29	vs Detroit	Cartier Field • Notre Dame, Indiana	4–0	20–6	8–2
27	May 29	vs Minnesota	Cartier Field • Notre Dame, Indiana	5–1	21–6	8–2
28	May 30	at Notre Dame	Cartier Field • Notre Dame, Indiana	2–0	22–6	8–2
29	May 30	at Notre Dame	Cartier Field • Notre Dame, Indiana	9–6	23–6	8–2

June (0–1)

#	Date	Opponent	Site/stadium	Score	Overall record	MAC record
30	June 6	at Michigan State	Old College Field • East Lansing, Michigan	0–8	23–7	8–2

College World Series (1–2)

#	Date	Opponent	Site/stadium	Score	Overall record	MAC record
31	June 12	vs Oklahoma State	Omaha Municipal Stadium • Omaha, Nebraska	2–10	23–8	8–2
32	June 14	vs Connecticut	Omaha Municipal Stadium • Omaha, Nebraska	14–6	24–8	8–2
33	June 15	vs Fresno State	Omaha Municipal Stadium • Omaha, Nebraska	2–7	24–9	8–2

== Awards and honors ==
Larry Belanger

- First Team All-MAC

Larry Buchanon

- First Team All-MAC

Len Grabowski

- Second Team All-MAC

Bill Topp

- First Team All-MAC
