= 1960 North Carolina Tar Heels baseball team =

American college baseball season

1960 North Carolina Tar Heels baseball

Atlantic Coast champions District III champions

College World Series, T-7th
- Conference: Atlantic Coast
- CB: No. 8
- Record: 22–7 (11–3 ACC)
- Head coach: Walter Rabb (14th season)
- MVP: Wayne Young
- Home stadium: Emerson Field

1960 Atlantic Coast Conference baseball standings
	Conf.						Overall
Team	W		L		T	PCT	W		L		T	PCT
No. 8 North Carolina ‍†‍‍^{y}	11	–	3	–	0	.786	22	–	7	–	0	.759
Duke ‍‍‍	9	–	4	–	1	.679	13	–	8	–	1	.614
NC State ‍‍‍	9	–	5	–	0	.643	12	–	8	–	0	.600
Clemson ‍‍‍	7	–	6	–	0	.538	11	–	10	–	1	.523
Wake Forest ‍‍‍	7	–	7	–	0	.500	14	–	7	–	0	.667
Maryland ‍‍‍	5	–	7	–	0	.417	9	–	9	–	1	.500
Virginia ‍‍‍	3	–	11	–	1	.233	3	–	15	–	2	.200
South Carolina ‍‍‍	3	–	11	–	0	.214	4	–	18	–	0	.182
† – Conference champion y – Invited to the NCAA tournament As of June 30, 1960; Rankings from Collegiate Baseball

The 1960 North Carolina Tar Heels baseball team represented University of North Carolina at Chapel Hill in the 1960 NCAA University Division baseball season. The Tar Heels played their home games at Emerson Field. The team was coached by Walter Rabb in his 14th year as head coach at North Carolina.

The Tar Heels won the District III playoff to advance to the College World Series, where they were defeated by the Oklahoma State Cowboys.

== Roster ==
1960 North Carolina Tar Heels baseball team
Players
Coaches

#	Pos.	Name	B/T	Height	Weight	Year	Home town
		Al Baldwin	/	—	—	Sr
		Carroll Bolick	/	—	—	Jr
		Vaughn Bryson	/	—	—	Sr
	OF	Jon Burgwyn	/	—	—	Sr
		Tommy Camp	/	—	—	Jr
		Larry Craver	/	—	—	Sr
		Bruce Crump	/	—	—	Sr
		Bob Deaton	/	—	—	Jr
		Len Dellilio	/	—	—	So
		Bud Ellerbe	/	—	—
		Lindsey Frost	/	—	—	Sr
	OF	Gerald Griffin	/	—	—	Sr
		Ben Hammett	/	—	—	Sr
		Russell Hollers	/	—	—	Jr
		Jim Hudock	/	—	—
		Dave Murr	/	—	—
	INF	Ferg Norton	/	—	—	Jr
		Jack Rees	/	—	—	So
		Tommy Saintsing	/	—	—	Sr
		Johnnie Scott	/	—	—	Jr
		Paul Swing	/	—	—	So
		Dick Tarlow	/	—	—
	P	Nicky Warren	/	—	—
	INF	Harold Workman	/	—	—	Sr
	P	Wayne Young	/	—	—	Sr

Head coach

Walter Rabb

Assistant coach(es)

Legend

- (C) Team captain
- (S) Suspended
- (I) Ineligible
- Injured
- Current redshirt

== Schedule ==
1960 North Carolina Tar Heels baseball game log
Regular season
March (3–2)

#	Date	Opponent	Site/stadium	Score	Overall record	ACC record
1	March 21	at Florida	Perry Field • Gainesville, Florida	0–19	0–1	–
2	March 22	at Florida	Perry Field • Gainesville, Florida	3–1	1–1	–
3	March 23	at Florida	Perry Field • Gainesville, Florida	6–4	2–1	–
4	March 25	Dartmouth	Emerson Field • Chapel Hill, North Carolina	4–2	3–1	–
5	March 26	Colby	Emerson Field • Chapel Hill, North Carolina	8–13	3–2	–

April (9–3)

#	Date	Opponent	Site/stadium	Score	Overall record	ACC record
6	April 1	Yale	Emerson Field • Chapel Hill, North Carolina	9–4	4–2	–
7	April 5	Delaware	Emerson Field • Chapel Hill, North Carolina	5–2	5–2	–
8	April 6	Delaware	Emerson Field • Chapel Hill, North Carolina	6–3	6–2	–
9	April 7	Colgate	Emerson Field • Chapel Hill, North Carolina	10–5	7–2	–
10	April 8	Colgate	Emerson Field • Chapel Hill, North Carolina	6–1	8–2	–
11	April 9	at Wake Forest	Ernie Shore Field • Winston-Salem, North Carolina	3–4	8–3	0–1
12	April 14	Maryland	Emerson Field • Chapel Hill, North Carolina	4–5	8–4	0–2
13	April 15	Clemson	Emerson Field • Chapel Hill, North Carolina	0–4	8–5	0–3
14	April 16	South Carolina	Emerson Field • Chapel Hill, North Carolina	6–5	9–5	1–3
15	April 25	Virginia	Emerson Field • Chapel Hill, North Carolina	13–0	10–5	2–3
16	April 28	Duke	Emerson Field • Chapel Hill, North Carolina	9–5	11–5	3–3
17	April 30	at NC State	Riddick Stadium • Raleigh, North Carolina	7–2	12–5	4–3

May (7–0)

#	Date	Opponent	Site/stadium	Score	Overall record	ACC record
18	May 2	at Maryland	Shipley Field • College Park, Maryland	10–3	13–5	5–3
19	May 3	at Virginia	UVA Baseball Field • Charlottesville, Virginia	2–6	14–5	6–3
20	May 6	Wake Forest	Emerson Field • Chapel Hill, North Carolina	2–1	15–5	7–3
21	May 9	at Clemson	Riggs Field • Clemson, South Carolina	6–3	16–5	8–3
22	May 10	at South Carolina	Unknown • Columbia, South Carolina	3–2	17–5	9–3
23	May 12	NC State	Emerson Field • Chapel Hill, North Carolina	1–0	18–5	10–3
24	May 14	at Duke	Jack Coombs Field • Durham, North Carolina	6–3	19–5	11–3

Postseason
District III Playoff (3–0)

#	Date	Opponent	Site/stadium	Score	Overall record	ACC record
25	May 3	vs Florida Southern	Sims Legion Park • Gastonia, North Carolina	2–1	20–5	11–3
26	May 6	vs The Citadel	Sims Legion Park • Gastonia, North Carolina	13–1	21–5	11–3
27	May 6	vs Florida	Sims Legion Park • Gastonia, North Carolina	7–5	22–5	11–3

College World Series (0–2)

#	Date	Opponent	Site/stadium	Score	Overall record	ACC record
28	May 14	vs Minnesota	Omaha Municipal Stadium • Omaha, Nebraska	3–8	22–6	11–3
29	May 15	vs Oklahoma State	Omaha Municipal Stadium • Omaha, Nebraska	0–7	22–7	11–3

== Awards and honors ==
John Burgwyn

- First Team All-ACC

Gerald Griffin

- First Team All-ACC

Ferg Norton

- First Team All-ACC

Wayne Young

- First Team All-ACC
- Second Team All-American
