= 1959 Connecticut Huskies baseball team =

Baseball team

1959 Connecticut Huskies baseball

Yankee Conference Champion NCAA District 1 playoff champion

College World Series, 1–2
- Conference: Yankee Conference
- Record: 20–3 (10–0 Yankee)
- Head coach: J. O. Christian (24th season)
- Home stadium: Gardner Dow Athletic Fields

1959 Yankee Conference baseball standings
	Conf.				Overall
Team	W		L	PCT	W		L	PCT
No. 7 Connecticut ‍†‍‍^{y}	10	–	0	1.000	20	–	3	.870
Maine ‍‍‍	7	–	3	.700	12	–	8	.600
UMass ‍‍‍	4	–	5	.444	10	–	6	.625
Vermont ‍‍‍	4	–	6	.400	15	–	11	.577
New Hampshire ‍‍‍	3	–	7	.300	7	–	11	.389
Rhode Island ‍‍‍	1	–	8	.111	2	–	11	.154
† – Conference champion y – Invited to the NCAA tournament As of June 30, 1959; Rankings from Collegiate Baseball

The 1959 Connecticut Huskies baseball team represented the University of Connecticut in the 1959 NCAA University Division baseball season. The Huskies were led by J. O. Christian in his 24th year as head coach, and played as part of the Yankee Conference. Connecticut posted a 20–3 record, earned the Yankee Conference championship with a 10–0 regular season to claim the automatic bid to the 1959 NCAA University Division baseball tournament. They were an automatic selection to the 1959 College World Series for District 1, their second appearance in the ultimate college baseball event. The Huskies lost their first game against Penn State and were eliminated by Western Michigan.

== Roster ==
1959 Connecticut Huskies roster
- Robert Anderson; - Anthony Attansio; - Nicholas Briante; - Kenneth Collum; - Donald Doiron; - Edgar Flynn; - Thomas Halliwell; - Theodore Kosior; - Glenn McLellan; - David Musco; - Ed Shaefer	Pitchers: - Albert Belanger; - Joe Clement; - Bradley Leach; - John Risley; Catchers Infielders Outfielders: - Moe Morhardt; - Bill Stevens

== Schedule ==
1959 Connecticut Huskies baseball game log
Regular season

March
Date	Opponent	Site/stadium	Score	Overall record	YC record
	at Maryland*	Shipley Field • College Park, MD	W 13–1	1–0	
	at Howard*	Washington, DC	W 12–4	2–0	
	at North Carolina*	Emerson Field • Chapel Hill, NC	L 7–8	2–1	
	at Davidson*	Davidson, NC	W 11–7	3–1	

April
Date	Opponent	Site/stadium	Score	Overall record	YC record
Apr 4	Yale*		W 7–1	4–1	
Apr 16	Northeastern*		W 6–1	5–1	
Apr 18	Rhode Island		W 23–4	6–1	1–0
Apr 21	Wesleyan*		W 7–0	7–1	
Apr 22	New Hampshire		W 4–0	8–1	2–0
Apr 25	Boston University*		W 6–3	9–1	
Apr 28	UMass		W 9–4	10–1	3–0

May
Date	Opponent	Site/stadium	Score	Overall record	YC record
May 1	Vermont		W 4–1	11–1	4–0
May 2	Vermont		W 8–3	12–1	5–0
May 6	Coast Guard*		W 1–0	13–1	
May 7	Rhode Island		W 12–6	14–1	6–0
May 9	New Hampshire		W 10–4	15–1	7–0
May 11	American International*		W 8–3	16–1	
May 15	Maine		W 4–2	17–1	8–0
May 16	Maine	W 5–3	18–1	9–0	
May 22	Springfield*		W 3–1	19–1	
May 23	UMass		W 10–4	20–1	10–0

Postseason

College World Series
Date	Opponent	Site/stadium	Score	Overall record	CWS record
June 13	Penn State	Johnny Rosenblatt Stadium • Omaha, NE	L 3–5	20–2	0–1
June 14	Western Michigan	Johnny Rosenblatt Stadium • Omaha, NE	L 6–14	20–3	0–2
