= 1959 Oklahoma State Cowboys baseball team =

American college baseball season

1959 Oklahoma State Cowboys baseball

College World Series Champions Big Eight champions
- Conference: Big Eight Conference
- CB: No. 1
- Record: 27–5 (17–3 Big Eight)
- Head coach: Toby Greene (16th year)

1959 Big Eight Conference baseball standings
	Conf.				Overall
Team	W		L	PCT	W		L	PCT
No. 1 Oklahoma State ‍†‍‍^{y}	17	–	3	.850	27	–	5	.844
Nebraska ‍‍‍	11	–	4	.733	15	–	8	.652
Iowa State ‍‍‍	10	–	8	.556	11	–	12	.478
Colorado ‍‍‍	7	–	8	.467	11	–	10	.524
Oklahoma ‍‍‍	7	–	10	.412	12	–	11	.522
Kansas ‍‍‍	5	–	11	.313	9	–	11	.450
Kansas State ‍‍‍	4	–	9	.308	4	–	9	.308
Missouri ‍‍‍	3	–	11	.214	9	–	11	.450
† – Conference champion y – Invited to the NCAA tournament As of June 30, 1959; Rankings from Collegiate Baseball

The 1959 Oklahoma State Cowboys baseball team represented the Oklahoma State University in the 1959 NCAA University Division baseball season. The team was coached by Toby Greene in his 16th season at Oklahoma State.

The Cowboys won the College World Series, defeating the Arizona Wildcats in the championship game.

== Roster ==
1959 Oklahoma State Cowboys roster
Pitchers: Toby Bensinger - Senior; Win Chandler - Junior; Joel Horlen - Senior; Jim Mihura - Senior; Roy Peterson - Senior; George Scott - Junior; Dick Soergel - Junior	Infielders: Bob Andrew - Junior; Bruce Andrew - Sophomore; Jim Dobson - Sophomore; Grayson Mersch - Sophomore; Catchers: Ray Bond - Sophomore; Tim Smalley - Junior; Lew Wade - Junior	Outfielders: Ben Bancroft - Junior; Tim Green - Senior; Connie McIlvoy - Senior; Don Soergel - Junior

== Schedule ==
1959 Oklahoma State Cowboys baseball game log
Regular season
March

Date	Opponent	Score	Overall record	Big Eight record
March 18	at Rice	9-3	1–0	–
March 19	at Rice	5-6	1–1	–
March 20	at Houston	7-2	2–1	–
March 21	at Houston	7-4	3–1	–

April

Date	Opponent	Score	Overall record	Big Eight record
April 10	Kansas	9-0	4–1	1-0
April 11	Kansas	13-2	5–1	2-0
April 11	Kansas	6-0	6–1	3-0
April 20	at Oklahoma	9-3	7–1	4-0
April 20	at Oklahoma	8-1	8–1	5-0
April 21	at Oklahoma	6-5	9–1	6-0
April 24	Kansas State	19-1	10–1	7-0
April 25	Kansas State	15-0	11–1	8-0
April 25	Kansas State	8-3	12–1	9-0

May

Date	Opponent	Score	Overall record	Big Eight record
May 1	at Nebraska	2-7	12–2	9-1
May 2	at Nebraska	4-1	13–2	10-1
May 2	at Nebraska	5-1	14–2	11-1
May 8	at Colorado	10-2	15–2	12-1
May 9	at Colorado	6-5	16–2	13-1
May 9	at Colorado	7-2	17–2	14-1
May 15	Iowa State	1-4	17–3	14-2
May 16	Iowa State	6-9	17–4	14-3
May 16	Iowa State	3-0	18–4	15-3
May 22	Missouri	1-0	19–4	16-3
May 23	Missouri	2-1	20–4	17-3

Postseason
NCAA tournament: District V playoffs

Date	Opponent	Score	Overall record
May 29	vs. Bradley	7-6	21–4
May 30	vs. Bradley	6-2	22–4

NCAA tournament: College World Series

Date	Opponent	Site/stadium	Score	Overall record
June 12	vs. Western Michigan	Rosenblatt Stadium	10–2	23–4
June 14	vs. Penn State	Rosenblatt Stadium	8–6	24–4
June 15	vs. Arizona	Rosenblatt Stadium	3–5	24–5
June 16	vs. Penn State	Rosenblatt Stadium	4–3	25–5
June 17	vs. Fresno State	Rosenblatt Stadium	4–0	26–5
June 18	vs. Arizona	Rosenblatt Stadium	5–3	27–5

== Awards and honors ==
Bruce Andrew

- All-Big Eight
- College World Series All-Tournament Team

Jim Dobson

- College World Series Most Outstanding Player
- All-Big Eight

Ben Bancroft

- All-America Second Team
- All-Big Eight

Joel Horlen

- All-America Second Team
- All-Big Eight
- College World Series All-Tournament Team

Connie McIlvoy

- College World Series All-Tournament Team
