= 1959 NAIA World Series =

1959 NAIA baseball tournament
- 1959 NAIA World Series
- Teams: 8
- Format: Double elimination
- Finals site: Kokernot Field; Alpine, Texas
- Champions: Southern (1st title)
- Winning coach: Robert Henry Lee (1st title)
- MVP: Roger Repoz (Western Washington)

The 1959 NAIA World Series was the third annual tournament hosted by the National Association of Intercollegiate Athletics to determine the national champion of baseball among its member colleges and universities in the United States and Canada.

The tournament was played at Kokernot Field in Alpine, Texas, near the campus of Sul Ross State College.

Southern defeated Omaha in the championship series, 10–2, to win the Jaguars' first NAIA World Series. With the change in tournament format, Southern was the first team to win the NAIA World Series despite losing a tournament game.

Western Washington player Roger Repoz was named tournament MVP.

The tournament field decreased in size from the 1958 event, shrinking from twelve back to eight teams. Furthermore, the format of the tournament changed from single-elimination to double-elimination.

== Bracket ==
Upper round 1	Upper round 2	Upper final	Final
Omaha	15
Paterson State	5
Omaha	4
Rollins	11
Arkansas State Teachers	5
Rollins	16
Rollins	3
Southern	8
Southern Illinois	2
Western Washington	3
Western Washington	5
Southern	7
Southern	4
Sul Ross State	3	Southern	9	10
Omaha	17	2
Lower round 1	Lower round 2	Lower round 3	Lower final
Western Washington	6
Paterson State	11	Arkansas State Teachers	3	Rollins	11
Arkansas State Teachers	12	Western Washington	4	Omaha	13
Omaha	12
Omaha	6
Southern Illinois	5	Southern Illinois	1
Sul Ross State	0

== See also ==
- 1959 NCAA University Division baseball tournament
