= Jack Kaiser =

American athletics coach and administrator (1926–2022)

Biographical details
- Born: October 6, 1926; Brooklyn, New York, U.S.
- Died: May 25, 2022 (aged 95)

Playing career
- 1946–1949: St. John's
- 1950: Oneonta Red Sox
- 1951: Roanoke Ro-Sox
- 1952: Albany Senators
- Position: Outfielder

Coaching career (HC unless noted)
- 1953–1955: St. John's (Asst)
- 1956–1973: St. John's
- 1957–1958: Lexington Red Sox

Administrative career (AD unless noted)
- 1973–1995: St. John's

Head coaching record
- Overall: 366–132–1

John Warren Kaiser (October 6, 1926 – May 25, 2022) was Athletics Director Emeritus at St. John's University in Queens, NY. He was an American baseball player, college coach, and administrator. A graduate of St. John's Preparatory School Kaiser continued on to the Vincentian Father's St. John's University, where as a player, he helped St. John's to the 1949 College World Series. After a brief minor league career, he became head coach at St. John's. Kaiser managed the short-season Class D Lexington Red Sox in 1957 and 1958. Kaiser led the now-named St. John's Red Storm baseball team to eleven postseason appearances, including three trips to the College World Series (1960, 1966 and 1968) in his 18-year career as head coach. Kaiser then became athletic director at St. John's, and was instrumental in the establishment of the Big East Conference.

== Honors ==
- Kaiser was inducted into the ABCA Hall of Fame in 1979.
- Kaiser was inducted into the New York City Basketball Hall of Fame in 2012.
- The Big East Conference baseball tournament Most Outstanding Player Award is named in his honor.
- Jack Kaiser Stadium, home baseball field of the St. John's Red Storm, was constructed in 2000 and is named in his honor.

== Head coaching record ==
=== College baseball ===
Record table
Season	Team	Overall	Conference	Standing	Postseason
St. John's Redmen (Metropolitan New York Conference) (1956–1963)
1956	St. John's	16–4			NCAA tournament
1957	St. John's	21–5			NCAA tournament
1958	St. John's	14–10			
1959	St. John's	17–6			
1960	St. John's	20–7	10–4	2nd	College World Series
1961	St. John's	20–4			NCAA tournament
1962	St. John's	22–2			NCAA tournament
1963	St. John's	22–5			NCAA tournament
St. John's Redmen (Independent) (1964–1973)
1964	St. John's	20–6			NCAA tournament
1965	St. John's	12–10–1			
1966	St. John's	25–9			College World Series
1967	St. John's	22–6			NCAA tournament
1968	St. John's	25–10			College World Series
1969	St. John's	25–7			
1970	St. John's	22–16			
1971	St. John's	24–5–1			
1972	St. John's	21–6			NCAA tournament
1973	St. John's	19–15			
St. John's:		367–133–2			
Total:		367–133–2			
National champion Postseason invitational champion Conference regular season champion Conference regular season and conference tournament champion Division regular season champion Division regular season and conference tournament champion Conference tournament champion
