= 1960 St. John's Redmen baseball team =

American college baseball season

1960 St. John's Redmen baseball

District II champions

College World Series, 4th
- Conference: Metropolitan New York Conference
- Record: 20–7 (10–4 Met)
- Head coach: John Kaiser (5th season)
- Assistant coach: Lou Carnesecca
- Home stadium: Alley Pond Park

The 1960 St. John's Redmen baseball team represented the St. John's University in the 1960 NCAA University Division baseball season. The Redmen played their home games at Alley Pond Park. The team was coached by Jack Kaiser in his St. John's University in his 5th year at St. John's.

The Redmen, didn't qualify for the District II Tournament, because they finished second in the Metropolitan New York Conference, but with the Hofstra Pride opting out of the tournament due to their finals schedule, the Redmen were invited in their place. They won District II to advance to the College World Series, where they were defeated by the Arizona Wildcats.

== Roster ==
1960 St. John's Redmen baseball team
Players
Coaches

#	Pos.	Name	B/T	Height	Weight	Year	Home town
	RHP	Larry Bearnarth	R/R	6 ft 2 in (1.88 m)	203 lb (92 kg)	So	Staten Island, New York
	OF	Frank Ciraulo	/	—	—
	P	Frank Francheschini	/	—	—
		Bill Goldy	/	—	—
		Art Jasinski	/	—	—
	INF	Bill Maloney	/	—	—
	INF	Vin Merola	/	—	—
		Billy Merz	/	—	—
		Dom Moero	/	—	—
	C	Jim Pappas	/	—	—
		Sandy Taboh	/	—	—

Head coach

Jack Kaiser

Assistant coach(es)

Lou Carnesecca

Legend

- (C) Team captain
- (S) Suspended
- (I) Ineligible
- Injured
- Current redshirt

== Schedule ==
1960 St. John's Redmen baseball game log
Regular season
April (7–5)

#	Date	Opponent	Site/stadium	Score	Overall record	MNYC record
1	April 6	at Brooklyn	Unknown • New York, New York	17–4	1–0	1–0
2	April 8	at C.W. Post	Unknown • Brookville, New York	8–2	2–0	1–0
3	April	NYU	Alley Pond Park • New York, New York	1–3	2–1	1–1
4	April 12	at Fordham	Unknown • New York, New York	4–3	3–1	2–1
5	April 16	at Wagner	Unknown • New York, New York	0–2	3–2	2–2
6	April 20	at Manhattan	Van Cortlandt Park • New York, New York	0–6	3–3	2–3
7	April 21	at Adelphi	Unknown • Garden City, New York	12–3	4–3	2–3
8	April 22	at Army	Doubleday Field • West Point, New York	4–9	4–4	2–3
9	April 23	CCNY	Alley Pond Park • New York, New York	6–3	5–4	3–3
10	April 26	at Hofstra	University Field • Hempstead, New York	2–10	5–5	3–4
11	April 28	Iona	Alley Pond Park • New York, New York	7–4	6–5	3–4
12	April 30	Brooklyn	Alley Pond Park • New York, New York	3–1	7–5	4–4

May (10–0)

#	Date	Opponent	Site/stadium	Score	Overall record	MNYC record
13	May 2	Southern Connecticut State	Alley Pond Park • New York, New York	3–1	8–5	4–4
14	May 5	at Upsala	Unknown • East Orange, New Jersey	12–9	9–5	4–4
15	May 5	at NYU	Unknown • New York, New York	13–6	10–5	5–4
16	May 7	Fordham	Alley Pond Park • New York, New York	6–5	11–5	6–4
17	May 10	Wagner	Alley Pond Park • New York, New York	14–8	12–5	7–4
18	May 12	vs Hofstra	Barasch Field • New York, New York	2–1	13–5	8–4
19	May 14	at Manhattan	Van Cortlandt Park • New York, New York	3–2	14–5	9–4
20	May 17	at CCNY	Unknown • New York, New York	13–2	15–5	10–4
21	May 20	at Fairleigh Dickinson	Unknown • Teaneck, New Jersey	15–3	16–5	10–4
22	May 21	at Seton Hall	Owen T. Carroll Field • South Orange, New Jersey	6–2	17–5	10–4

Postseason
NCAA District II Playoff (2–1)

#	Date	Opponent	Site/stadium	Score	Overall record	MNYC record
23	May 27	vs Delaware	Doubleday Field • Cooperstown, New York	4–3	18–5	9–3
24	May 28	Villanova	Doubleday Field • Cooperstown, New York	7–2	19–5	9–3

College World Series (1–2)

#	Date	Opponent	Site/stadium	Score	Overall record	MNYC record
25	June 14	vs Southern California	Omaha Municipal Stadium • Omaha, Nebraska	1–3	19–6	9–3
26	June 15	vs Colorado State College	Omaha Municipal • Omaha, Nebraska	3–2	20–6	9–3
27	June 17	vs Arizona	Omaha Municipal • Omaha, Nebraska	4–11	20–7	9–3
