= 1960 Colorado State College Bears baseball team =

American college baseball season

1960 Colorado State College Bears baseball

Rocky Mountain Conference champions District VII champions

College World Series, T-5th
- Conference: Rocky Mountain Conference
- CB: No. 7
- Record: 25–12 (15–1 RMC)
- Head coach: Pete Butler (18th season)
- Home stadium: Jackson Field

1960 Rocky Mountain Conference baseball standings
	Conf.				Overall
Team	W		L	PCT	W		L	PCT
No. 7 Colorado State College ‍†‍‍^{y}	15	–	1	.938	25	–	12	.676
Colorado College ‍‍‍	1	–	3	.250		–		–
Colorado Mines ‍‍‍	0	–	4	.000	5	–	12	.294
Adams State ‍‍‍	0	–	4	.000		–		–
Western State ‍‍‍	0	–	4	.000		–		–
† – Conference champion y – Invited to the College World Series; As of June 30, 1960; Rankings from Collegiate Baseball

The 1960 Colorado State College Bears baseball team represented Colorado State College in the 1960 NCAA University Division baseball season. The Bears played their home games at Jackson Field. The team was coached by Pete Butler in his 18th year at Colorado State.

The Bears won the District VII playoff to advanced to the College World Series, where they were defeated by the St. John's Redmen.

== Roster ==
1960 Colorado State College Bears baseball team
Players
Coaches

#	Pos.	Name	B/T	Height	Weight	Year	Home town
	LHP	Ernie Andrade	/L	—	—
	OF	George Bethel	/	—	—
	INF	John Bradley	/	—	—
	LHP	Frank Carbajal	/L	—	—
	RHP	Cisco Carlos	R/R	6 ft 3 in (1.91 m)	205 lb (93 kg)		Monrovia, California
	OF	Paul Chamberlain	/	—	—
	RHP	Joe Duca	/R	—	—
	C	George Dukes	/R	—	—	Fr
19	INF	Ron English	/R	—	—
	C	John Groninger	/R	—	—
	RHP	Don Herrick	/R	—	—
	OF	Norm Idleberg	/L	—	—
	INF	Jack Kile	/	—	—
	INF	John Koehler	R/R	—	—
	INF	Jim Lochner	/R	—	—
	LHP	Gerald Maglia	/L	—	—	Sr
	OF	Wayne Merritt	/	—	—
	OF	Kent Olson	/	—	—
	INF	Bob Preisendorf	L/	—	—
25	RHP	Jay Woodward	/R	—	—

Head coach

Pete Butler

Assistant coach(es)

Legend

- (C) Team captain
- (S) Suspended
- (I) Ineligible
- Injured
- Current redshirt

== Schedule ==
1960 Colorado State College Bears baseball game log
Regular season
March (1–5)

#	Date	Opponent	Site/stadium	Score	Overall record	RMC record
1	March 18	at Arizona	UA Field • Tucson, Arizona	3–8	0–1	–
2	March 19	at Arizona	UA Field • Tucson, Arizona	5–8	0–2	–
3	March 19	at Arizona	UA Field • Tucson, Arizona	0–1	0–3	–
4	March 21	at Arizona State	Unknown • Tempe, Arizona	4–8	0–4	–
5	March 22	at Arizona State	Unknown • Tempe, Arizona	3–7	0–5	–
6	March	at New Mexico	Lobo Field • Albuquerque, New Mexico	8–6	1–5	–

April (8–3)

#	Date	Opponent	Site/stadium	Score	Overall record	RMC record
7	April	vs Colorado State	Unknown • Unknown	1–2	1–6	–
8	April	vs Colorado Mines	Unknown • Unknown	15–1	2–6	1–0
9	April	vs Colorado Mines	Unknown • Unknown	24–3	3–6	2–0
10	April	vs Colorado State	Unknown • Unknown	5–4	4–6	2–0
11	April	vs Colorado State	Unknown • Unknown	4–7	4–7	2–0
12	April	vs Denver	Unknown • Unknown	3–0	5–7	2–0
13	April	vs Wyoming	Unknown • Unknown	15–9	6–7	2–0
14	April	vs Denver	Unknown • Unknown	7–4	7–7	2–0
15	April	vs Colorado College	Unknown • Unknown	7–10	7–8	2–1
16	April	vs Colorado College	Unknown • Unknown	25–3	8–8	3–1
17	April	vs Wyoming	Unknown • Unknown	11–1	9–8	3–1

May (12–1)

#	Date	Opponent	Site/stadium	Score	Overall record	RMC record
18	May	vs Colorado Mines	Unknown • Unknown	4–1	10–8	4–1
19	May	vs Western State	Unknown • Unknown	12–2	11–8	5–1
20	May	vs Western State	Unknown • Unknown	11–3	12–8	6–1
21	May	vs Colorado Mines	Unknown • Unknown	8–0	13–8	7–1
22	May	vs Adams State	Unknown • Unknown	16–2	14–8	8–1
23	May	vs Adams State	Unknown • Unknown	13–3	15–8	9–1
24	May	vs Denver	Unknown • Unknown	7–3	16–8	9–1
25	May	vs Western State	Unknown • Unknown	17–4	17–8	10–1
26	May	vs Western State	Unknown • Unknown	23–9	18–8	11–1
27	May	vs Colorado College	Unknown • Unknown	5–0	19–8	12–1
28	May	vs Colorado College	Unknown • Unknown	7–3	20–8	13–1
29	May	vs Adams State	Unknown • Unknown	13–5	21–8	14–1
30	May	vs Adams State	Unknown • Unknown	15–6	22–8	15–1
31	May 26	Air Force	Jackson Field • Greeley, Colorado	13–4	23–8	15–1
32	May 28	at Air Force	Falcon Baseball Field • Colorado Springs, Colorado	12–13	23–9	15–1

Postseason
District VII Playoff (2–1)

#	Date	Opponent	Site/stadium	Score	Overall record	RMC record
33	June	at Utah	Derks Field • Salt Lake City, Utah	3–24	23–10	15–1
34	June	at Utah	Derks Field • Salt Lake City, Utah	3–2	24–10	15–1
35	June	at Utah	Derks Field • Salt Lake City, Utah	6–2	25–10	15–1

College World Series (0–2)

#	Date	Opponent	Site/stadium	Score	Overall record	RMC record
36	June 14	vs Boston College	Omaha Municipal Stadium • Omaha, Nebraska	3–8	25–11	15–1
37	June 15	vs St. John's	Omaha Municipal Stadium • Omaha, Nebraska	2–3	25–12	15–1

== Awards and honors ==
Ernie Andrade

- All-Rocky Mountain Conference Team

Frank Carbajal

- All-Rocky Mountain Conference Team

Paul Chamberlain

- All-Rocky Mountain Conference Team

John Groninger

- All-Rocky Mountain Conference Team

Wayne Merrit

- All-Rocky Mountain Conference Team
