= 1960 Minnesota Golden Gophers baseball team =

American college baseball season

1960 Minnesota Golden Gophers baseball

National champions Big Ten Conference champions
- Conference: Big Ten Conference
- CB: No. 1
- Record: 34–7–1 (12–2–1 Big Ten)
- Head coach: Dick Siebert (13th year)
- Home stadium: Delta Field

1960 Big Ten Conference baseball standings
	Conf.						Overall
Team	W		L		T	PCT	W		L		T	PCT
No. 1 Minnesota ‍†‍‍^{y}	12	–	2	–	1	.833	34	–	7	–	1	.821
Ohio State ‍‍‍	6	–	4	–	0	.600	21	–	7	–	2	.733
Wisconsin ‍‍‍	5	–	4	–	0	.556	14	–	6	–	1	.690
Northwestern ‍‍‍	6	–	5	–	0	.545	17	–	9	–	0	.654
Michigan ‍‍‍	7	–	7	–	0	.500	19	–	12	–	1	.609
Purdue ‍‍‍	4	–	4	–	1	.500	12	–	8	–	1	.595
Illinois ‍‍‍	6	–	8	–	0	.429	21	–	10	–	0	.677
Michigan State ‍‍‍	4	–	7	–	0	.364	17	–	13	–	0	.567
Indiana ‍‍‍	5	–	9	–	0	.357	17	–	13	–	0	.567
Iowa ‍‍‍	3	–	8	–	0	.273	7	–	17	–	0	.292
† – Conference champion y – Invited to the NCAA tournament As of June 30, 1960; Rankings from Collegiate Baseball

The 1960 Minnesota Golden Gophers baseball team represented the University of Minnesota in the 1960 NCAA University Division baseball season. The Golden Gophers played their home games at Delta Field. The team was coached by Dick Siebert in his 13th season at Minnesota.

The Golden Gophers won the College World Series, defeating the USC Trojans in the championship game.

== Roster ==
1960 Minnesota Golden Gophers roster
Pitchers: Ken Anderson; Larry Bertelsen; Clyde Nelson; Jim Rantz; Saxe Roberts; Bob Wasko	Infielders: John Erickson; Wayne Knapp; Dave Pflepsen; Cal Rolloff; Catchers: Neil Junker; Al Provo	Outfielders: Dick Alford; Lee Brandt; Ron Causton; Barry Effress; Wayne Haefner; Tom Moe; Howard Nathe

== Schedule ==
1960 Minnesota Golden Gophers baseball game log
Regular season
March

Date	Opponent	Score	Overall record	Big Ten record
March 21	at Texas	14–21	0–1	–
March 22	at Texas	7–13	0–2	–
March 23	at Sam Houston State	6–2	1–2	–
March 24	at Sam Houston State	9–5	2–2	–
March 24	at Sam Houston State	14–15	2–3	–
March 25	at Houston	4–5	2–4	–
March 26	at Houston	5–1	3–4	–

April

Date	Opponent	Score	Overall record	Big Ten record
April 1	at Iowa State	5–4	4–4	–
April 2	at Iowa State	4–1	5–4	–
April 2	at Iowa State	9–8	6–4	–
April 8	at St. Mary's	8–4	7–4	–
April 9	at Luther	14–4	8–4	–
April 9	at Luther	2–0	9–4	–
April 15	at South Dakota State	28–2	10–4	–
April 22	Northern Iowa	1–0	11–4	–
April 22	Northern Iowa	13–1	12–4	–
April 23	Northern Iowa	13–0	13–4	–
April 23	Northern Iowa	13–1	14–4	–
April 29	Michigan State	13–6	15–4	1–0
April 30	Michigan	10–3	16–4	2–0
April 30	Michigan	11–2	17–4	3–0

May

Date	Opponent	Score	Overall record	Big Ten record
May 6	at Ohio State	8–6	18–4	4–0
May 7	at Indiana	4–2	19–4	5–0
May 7	at Indiana	1–2	19–5	5–1
May 13	Wisconsin	8–4	20–5	6–1
May 14	Northwestern	3–2	21–5	7–1
May 14	Northwestern	4–2	22–5	8–1
May 20	at Illinois	9–1	23–5	9–1
May 21	at Purdue	3–6	23–6	9–2
May 21	at Purdue	7–7	23–6–1	9–2–1
May 27	Iowa	17–3	24–6–1	10–2–1
May 28	Iowa	7–3	25–6–1	11–2–1
May 28	Iowa	8–0	26–6–1	12–2–1

Postseason
NCAA tournament: Mideast Regional

Date	Opponent	Score	Overall record
June 2	vs. Notre Dame	15–6	27–6–1
June 3	vs. Detroit	12–5	28–6–1
June 4	vs. Detroit	5–4	29–6–1

NCAA tournament: College World Series

Date	Opponent	Site/stadium	Score	Overall record
June 14	vs. North Carolina	Rosenblatt Stadium	8–3	30–6–1
June 15	vs. Arizona	Rosenblatt Stadium	8–5	31–6–1
June 16	vs. Southern California	Rosenblatt Stadium	12–11	32–6–1
June 18	vs. Oklahoma State	Rosenblatt Stadium	3–1	33–6–1
June 19	vs. Southern California	Rosenblatt Stadium	3–4	33–7–1
June 20	vs. Southern California	Rosenblatt Stadium	2–1	34–7–1

== Awards and honors ==
Larry Bertelsen

- All-America First Team
- All-Big Ten First Team

John Erickson

- College World Series Most Outstanding Player

Wayne Knapp

- All-American First Team
- All-Big Ten First Team

David Pflepsen

- All-Big Ten First Team
- All-College World Series Team

Howard Nathe

- All-Big Ten First Team

Carl Rolloff

- All-College World Series Team

Bob Wasko

- All-College World Series Team
