= 1960 NCAA University Division baseball season =

Baseball season

NCAA tournament

College World Series
- Champions: Minnesota (2nd title)
- Runners-up: USC (6th CWS Appearance)
- Winning coach: Dick Siebert (2nd title)
- MOP: John Erickson (Minnesota)

Seasons
- ← 1959 1961 →

The 1960 NCAA University Division baseball season, play of college baseball in the United States organized by the National Collegiate Athletic Association (NCAA) began in the spring of 1960. The season progressed through the regular season and concluded with the 1960 College World Series. The College World Series, held for the fourteenth time in 1960, consisted of one team from each of eight geographical districts and was held in Omaha, Nebraska at Johnny Rosenblatt Stadium as a double-elimination tournament. Minnesota claimed the championship.

== Conference winners ==
This is a partial list of conference champions from the 1960 season. Each of the eight geographical districts chose, by various methods, the team that would represent them in the NCAA tournament. 10 teams earned automatic bids by winning their conference championship while 16 teams earned at-large selections.

Conference	Regular season winner
Atlantic Coast Conference	North Carolina
Big Eight Conference	Oklahoma State
Big Ten Conference	Minnesota
CIBA	California; Southern California
EIBL	Army
Mid-American Conference	Ohio
Pacific Coast Conference	Washington
Rocky Mountain Conference	Colorado State College
Southeastern Conference	Ole Miss
Southern Conference	The Citadel; Richmond
Southwest Conference	Texas
Yankee Conference	Connecticut; Maine

== Conference standings ==
The following is an incomplete list of conference standings:

1960 Athletic Association of Western Universities baseball standings
	Conf.				Overall
Team	W		L	PCT	W		L	PCT
North Division
No. 12 Washington State ‍†‍‍^{y}	9	–	2	.818	29	–	6	.829
Oregon State ‍‍‍	7	–	5	.583	18	–	5	.783
Oregon ‍‍‍	6	–	6	.500		–		–
Washington ‍‍‍	7	–	8	.467	20	–	12	.625
Idaho ‍‍‍	3	–	11	.214		–		–
California Intercollegiate Baseball Association
No. 2 Southern California ‍†‍‍^{y}	12	–	4	.750	32	–	11	.744
No. 16 California ‍†‍‍	12	–	4	.750	30	–	14	.682
Santa Clara ‍‍‍	6	–	10	.375		–		–
Stanford ‍‍‍	6	–	10	.375	20	–	17	.541
UCLA ‍‍‍	4	–	12	.250	18	–	29	.383
† – Conference champion y – Invited to the NCAA tournament As of June 30, 1960; Rankings from Collegiate Baseball

1960 Atlantic Coast Conference baseball standings
	Conf.						Overall
Team	W		L		T	PCT	W		L		T	PCT
No. 8 North Carolina ‍†‍‍^{y}	11	–	3	–	0	.786	22	–	7	–	0	.759
Duke ‍‍‍	9	–	4	–	1	.679	13	–	8	–	1	.614
NC State ‍‍‍	9	–	5	–	0	.643	12	–	8	–	0	.600
Clemson ‍‍‍	7	–	6	–	0	.538	11	–	10	–	1	.523
Wake Forest ‍‍‍	7	–	7	–	0	.500	14	–	7	–	0	.667
Maryland ‍‍‍	5	–	7	–	0	.417	9	–	9	–	1	.500
Virginia ‍‍‍	3	–	11	–	1	.233	3	–	15	–	2	.200
South Carolina ‍‍‍	3	–	11	–	0	.214	4	–	18	–	0	.182
† – Conference champion y – Invited to the NCAA tournament As of June 30, 1960; Rankings from Collegiate Baseball

1960 Big Eight Conference baseball standings
	Conf.				Overall
Team	W		L	PCT	W		L	PCT
No. 4 Oklahoma State ‍†‍‍^{y}	12	–	4	.750	17	–	7	.708
Iowa State ‍‍‍	12	–	6	.667	14	–	9	.609
Oklahoma ‍‍‍	12	–	7	.632	13	–	10	.565
Missouri ‍‍‍	9	–	6	.600	12	–	9	.571
Colorado ‍‍‍	7	–	9	.438	10	–	12	.455
Kansas ‍‍‍	7	–	11	.389	11	–	13	.458
Nebraska ‍‍‍	6	–	11	.353	10	–	13	.435
Kansas State ‍‍‍	3	–	14	.176	5	–	18	.217
† – Conference champion y – Invited to the NCAA tournament As of June 30, 1960; Rankings from Collegiate Baseball

1960 Big Ten Conference baseball standings
	Conf.						Overall
Team	W		L		T	PCT	W		L		T	PCT
No. 1 Minnesota ‍†‍‍^{y}	12	–	2	–	1	.833	34	–	7	–	1	.821
Ohio State ‍‍‍	6	–	4	–	0	.600	21	–	7	–	2	.733
Wisconsin ‍‍‍	5	–	4	–	0	.556	14	–	6	–	1	.690
Northwestern ‍‍‍	6	–	5	–	0	.545	17	–	9	–	0	.654
Michigan ‍‍‍	7	–	7	–	0	.500	19	–	12	–	1	.609
Purdue ‍‍‍	4	–	4	–	1	.500	12	–	8	–	1	.595
Illinois ‍‍‍	6	–	8	–	0	.429	21	–	10	–	0	.677
Michigan State ‍‍‍	4	–	7	–	0	.364	17	–	13	–	0	.567
Indiana ‍‍‍	5	–	9	–	0	.357	17	–	13	–	0	.567
Iowa ‍‍‍	3	–	8	–	0	.273	7	–	17	–	0	.292
† – Conference champion y – Invited to the NCAA tournament As of June 30, 1960; Rankings from Collegiate Baseball

1960 Rocky Mountain Conference baseball standings
	Conf.				Overall
Team	W		L	PCT	W		L	PCT
No. 7 Colorado State College ‍†‍‍^{y}	15	–	1	.938	25	–	12	.676
Colorado College ‍‍‍	1	–	3	.250		–		–
Colorado Mines ‍‍‍	0	–	4	.000	5	–	12	.294
Adams State ‍‍‍	0	–	4	.000		–		–
Western State ‍‍‍	0	–	4	.000		–		–
† – Conference champion y – Invited to the College World Series; As of June 30, 1960; Rankings from Collegiate Baseball

== College World Series ==
The 1960 season marked the fourteenth NCAA baseball tournament, which culminated with the eight team College World Series. The College World Series was held in Omaha, Nebraska. The eight teams played a double-elimination format, with Minnesota claiming their second championship with a 2–1 win over Southern California in the final.

Upper round 1
Arizona	2
Oklahoma State	1
Minnesota	8
North Carolina	3
Boston College	8
Colorado State College	3
Southern California	3
St. John's	1

Upper round 2
Arizona	5
Minnesota	8
Boston College	2
Southern California	5
Lower round 1
Oklahoma State	7
North Carolina	0
Colorado State College	2
St. John's	3^{13}

Upper final
Minnesota	12^{10}
Southern California	11
Lower round 2
Boston College	0
Oklahoma State	1
Arizona	11
St. John's	4

Semifinals
Minnesota	3
Oklahoma State	1
Southern California	13
Arizona	1

Final
Minnesota	2	2^{10}
Southern California	4^{11}	1
