= 1959 Arizona Wildcats baseball team =

American university baseball season

1959 Arizona Wildcats baseball

Border champion District 6 champion

College World Series, 2nd
- Conference: Border Conference
- Record: 39–10–2 (6–1 Border)
- Head coach: Frank Sancet (9th year)
- Home stadium: UA Field

The 1959 Arizona Wildcats baseball team represented the University of Arizona in the 1959 NCAA University Division baseball season. The Wildcats played their home games at UA Field and Hi Corbett Field in Tucson, Arizona. The team was coached by Frank Sancet in his ninth season at Arizona.

The Wildcats reached the College World Series, finishing as the runner up to Oklahoma State.

== Roster ==
1959 Arizona Wildcats roster
- Luis Bachelier; - Thomas H. Browning; - Joseph Eugene Bubala; - Mark S. Clarke; - John H. Colyer; - Matthew Encinas; - Robert Encinas Jr.; - F. Leslie Fenderson Jr.; - Alan D. Hall	- Augustus L. Hoffman; - Jerry B. Lewis; - Richard F. Nixon; - James Edward Nowinski; - Jesus J. Ruiz; - Charlie Shoemaker; - Linn A. Wallace; - James Robert Wilson; - Richard N. Wilson	Pitchers: - David G. Baldwin; - Norm J. Popkin; - Jim Ward; - Gus Zellar; Infielders Catchers Outfielders

== Schedule ==
Legend
Arizona win
Arizona loss
Tie

1959 Arizona Wildcats baseball game log
Regular season

March
Date	Opponent	Site/stadium	Score	Overall record
Mar 6	UCLA	Tucson, AZ	W 17–3	1–0
Mar 7	UCLA	Tucson, AZ	W 18–6	2–0
Mar 7	UCLA	Tucson, AZ	L 6–7	2–1
Mar 9	New Mexico	Tucson, AZ	W 15–4	3–1
Mar 10	New Mexico	Tucson, AZ	W 21–5	4–1
Mar 13	Pepperdine	Tucson, AZ	W 6–3	5–1
Mar 14	Pepperdine	Tucson, AZ	W 13–5	6–1
Mar 17	Colorado A&M	Tucson, AZ	W 6–4	7–1
Mar 18	Colorado A&M	Tucson, AZ	W 18–3	8–1
Mar 20	Colorado State	Tucson, AZ	W 6–4	9–1
Mar 21	Colorado State	Tucson, AZ	L 2–6	9–2
Mar 21	Colorado State	Tucson, AZ	W 5–1	10–2
Mar 23	Iowa	Tucson, AZ	T 6–6	10–2–1
Mar 24	Iowa	Tucson, AZ	L 9–12	10–3–1
Mar 25	Iowa	Tucson, AZ	W 12–3	11–3–1
Mar 26	Iowa	Tucson, AZ	W 9–4	12–3–1
Mar 28	Iowa	Tucson, AZ	W 7–6	13–3–1
Mar 28	Iowa	Tucson, AZ	L 4–9	13–4–1
Mar 30	at Southern California	Bovard Field • Los Angeles, CA	T 6–6	13–4–2
Mar 31	at UCLA	Joe E. Brown Field • Los Angeles, CA	W 3–1	14–4–2

April
Date	Opponent	Site/stadium	Score	Overall record
Apr 1	at Cal State Los Angeles	Los Angeles, CA	W 10–4	15–4–2
Apr 2	at Cal State Los Angeles	Los Angeles, CA	W 10–3	16–4–2
Apr 3	at Pepperdine	Malibu, CA	W 8–4	17–4–2
Apr 4	at Pepperdine	Malibu, CA	W 8–4	18–4–2
Apr 7	Northern Arizona	Tucson, AZ	W 7–4	19–4–2
Apr 8	Northern Arizona	Tucson, AZ	W 21–1	20–4–2
Apr 11	Arizona State	Tucson, AZ	W 10–1	21–4–2
Apr 11	Arizona State	Tucson, AZ	W 6–3	22–4–2
Apr 15	Davis-Monthan AFB	Tucson, AZ	W 13–0	23–4–2
Apr 17	Sul Ross	Tucson, AZ	W 4–1	24–4–2
Apr 18	Sul Ross	Tucson, AZ	W 11–5	25–4–2
Apr 18	Sul Ross	Tucson, AZ	W 6–1	26–4–2
Apr 20	San Diego Marines	Tucson, AZ	W 6–3	27–4–2
Apr 21	San Diego Marines	Tucson, AZ	L 3–4	27–5–2
Apr 23	New Mexico State	Tucson, AZ	W 12–8	28–5–2
Apr 25	Air Force	Tucson, AZ	W 13–0	29–5–2
Apr 25	Air Force	Tucson, AZ	W 23–2	30–5–2
Apr 28	Camp Pendleton Marines	Tucson, AZ	W 8–3	31–5–2
Apr 29	Camp Pendleton Marines	Tucson, AZ	W 12–1	32–5–2

May
Date	Opponent	Site/stadium	Score	Overall record
May 2	at Arizona State	Tempe, AZ	L 2–3	32–6–2
May 2	at Arizona State	Tempe, AZ	W 9–1	33–6–2
May 7	Casa Grande	Tucson, AZ	L 6–9	33–7–2
May 12	Davis-Montan AFB	Tucson, AZ	W 25–1	34–7–2
May 15	Casa Grande	Tucson, AZ	L 8–9	34–8–2

Postseason

NCAA District 6 Playoff
Date	Opponent	Site/stadium	Score	Overall record	NCAAT record
June 1	at Texas A&M	Kyle Baseball Field • College Station, TX	W 1–0	35–8–2	1–0
June 2	at Texas A&M	Kyle Baseball Field • College Station, TX	W 1–0	36–8–2	2–0

College World Series
Date	Opponent	Site/stadium	Score	Overall record	CWS record
June 13	Clemson	Johnny Rosenblatt Stadium • Omaha, NE	W 3–2^{12}	37–8–2	1–0
June 14	Fresno State	Johnny Rosenblatt Stadium • Omaha, NE	W 5–1	38–8–2	2–0
June 15	Oklahoma State	Johnny Rosenblatt Stadium • Omaha, NE	W 5–3	39–8–2	3–0
June 16	Fresno State	Johnny Rosenblatt Stadium • Omaha, NE	L 0–2	39–9–2	3–1
June 18	Oklahoma State	Johnny Rosenblatt Stadium • Omaha, NE	L 3–5	39–10–2	3–2
