= 1960 Boston College Eagles baseball team =

American college baseball season

1960 Boston College Eagles baseball

Greater Boston League champions District I champions

College World Series, T-5th
- Conference: Greater Boston Intercollegiate Baseball League
- CB: No. 6
- Record: 15–6 (7–3 GBL)
- Head coach: Eddie Pellagrini (3rd season)
- Captain: Bob Martin
- Home stadium: Alumni Field

The 1960 Boston College Eagles baseball team represented Boston College in the 1960 NCAA University Division baseball season. The Eagles played their home games at Alumni Field. The team was coached by Eddie Pellagrini in his 3rd year at Boston College.

The Eagles won the District I Playoff to advance to the College World Series, where they were defeated by the Oklahoma State Cowboys.

== Roster ==
1960 Boston College Eagles baseball team
Players
Coaches

#	Pos.	Name	B/T	Height	Weight	Year	Home town
		Charley Bunker	/	—	—
		Billy Cunis	/	—	—	So
	C	Bill Dailey	/	—	—	So
	INF	Frong Faggiano	/	—	—
	P	Gerald Greely	/	—	—
	OF	Gerry Hamel	/	—	—
	OF	Bernie Kilroy	/	—	—
	OF	Bob Martin (C)	/	—	—	Jr
	INF	Red Martin	/	—	—	Jr
		Fred Milton	/	—	—
	P	Bob Niemiec	/	—	—
	P	Bill Robinson	/	—	—
	P	Jack Shoppmeyer	/	—	—

Head coach

Eddie Pellagrini

Assistant coach(es)

Legend

- (C) Team captain
- (S) Suspended
- (I) Ineligible
- Injured
- Current redshirt

== Schedule ==
1960 Boston College Eagles baseball game log
Regular season
April (7–1)

#	Date	Opponent	Site/stadium	Score	Overall record	GBL record
1	April 7	at Tufts	Unknown • Medford, Massachusetts	3–4	0–1	0–1
2	April 9	MIT	Alumni Field • Boston, Massachusetts	6–0	1–1	1–1
3	April 19	Boston University	Alumni Field • Boston, Massachusetts	8–1	2–1	2–1
4	April 20	at Brandeis	Unknown • Boston, Massachusetts	4–3	3–1	3–1
5	April 23	at Colby	Alumni Field • Boston, Massachusetts	11–3	4–1	3–1
6	April 25	at Northeastern	Parsons Field • Brookline, Massachusetts	12–5	5–1	4–1
7	April 26	at Harvard	Joseph J. O'Donnell Field • Boston, Massachusetts	13–4	6–1	5–1
8	April 30	Providence	Alumni Field • Boston, Massachusetts	8–4	7–1	5–1

May (4–3)

#	Date	Opponent	Site/stadium	Score	Overall record	GBL record
9	May 4	Massachusetts	Alumni Field • Boston, Massachusetts	5–14	7–2	5–2
10	May	Saint Peter's	Unknown • Unknown	6–5	8–2	5–2
11	May 12	Suffolk	Alumni Field • Boston, Massachusetts	7–8	8–3	5–2
12	May 14	at Providence	Unknown • Providence, Rhode Island	10–7	9–3	5–2
13	May 16	Northeastern	Alumni Field • Boston, Massachusetts	4–3	10–3	6–2
14	May 19	Tufts	Alumni Field • Boston, Massachusetts	7–4	11–3	7–2
15	May 30	at Holy Cross	Fitton Field • Worcester, Massachusetts	–	11–4	7–3

Postseason
District I Playoff (2–0)

#	Date	Opponent	Site/stadium	Score	Overall record	GBL record
16	June 4	vs Connecticut	AIC Park • Springfield, Massachusetts	2–1	12–4	7–3
17	June 5	vs Holy Cross	AIC Park • Springfield, Massachusetts	5–4	13–4	7–3

June (1–0)

#	Date	Opponent	Site/stadium	Score	Overall record	GBL record
18	June 10	Holy Cross	Alumni Field • Boston, Massachusetts	–	14–4	7–3

College World Series (1–2)

#	Date	Opponent	Site/stadium	Score	Overall record	GBL record
19	June 14	vs Colorado State College	Omaha Municipal Stadium • Omaha, Nebraska	8–3	15–4	7–3
20	June 16	vs Southern California	Omaha Municipal Stadium • Omaha, Nebraska	2–5	15–5	7–3
21	June 17	vs Oklahoma State	Omaha Municipal Stadium • Omaha, Nebraska	0–1	15–6	7–3
