= 1960 Arizona Wildcats baseball team =

American college baseball season

1960 Arizona Wildcats baseball

District VI champions

College World Series, 3rd
- Conference: Border Conference
- Record: 43–9 (2–2 Border)
- Head coach: Frank Sancet (11th season)
- Home stadium: UA Field

The 1960 Arizona Wildcats baseball team represented the University of Arizona in the 1960 NCAA University Division baseball season. The Wildcats played their home games at UA Field. The team was coached by Frank Sancet in his 11th year at Arizona.

The Wildcats won the District VI Playoff to advance to the College World Series, where they were defeated by the Southern California Trojans.

== Roster ==
1960 Arizona Wildcats baseball team
Players
Coaches

#	Pos.	Name	B/T	Height	Weight	Year	Home town
		Luis Bachelier	/	—	—
	P	Dave Baldwin	/	—	—
	OF	Bill Barrclough	/	—	—
		Gordon Bergthold	/	—	—
		Gene Bubala	/	—	—	So
		Thomas Celli	/	—	—
		Mark Clarke	/	—	—
		Kenny Coopwood	/	—	—
		Bob Encinas	/	—	—
		Les Fenderson	/	—	—
		Jim Geist	/	—	—	Sr
		Chuck Giles	/	—	—
	C	Alan Hall	/	—	—	Sr
		Larry Hamann	/	—	—
		Larry Hoffman	/	—	—	Sr
		Kenneth Hunt	/	—	—
		Tom Kassner	/	—	—
		Gary LaFevers	/	—	—
		Mike Lane	/	—	—
		Michael Longo	/	—	—
		Rick Lord	/	—	—
		Aurelio Martinez	/	—	—
		Ray McCoy	/	—	—
		Bill Parrott	/	—	—
		Willie Peete	/	—	—
		Thomas Roqueni	/	—	—
		Bud Schoenberg	/	—	—
	INF	Charlie Shoemaker	/	—	—
		Armando Urbina	/	—	—
		Linn Wallace	/	—	—	Sr
	P	Jim Ward	/	—	—	Sr
		Miles Zeller	/	—	—

Head coach

45 Frank Sancet

Assistant coach(es)

Legend

- (C) Team captain
- (S) Suspended
- (I) Ineligible
- Injured
- Current redshirt

== Schedule ==
1960 Arizona Wildcats baseball game log
Regular season
March (15–4)

#	Date	Opponent	Site/stadium	Score	Overall record	Border record
1	March 7	New Mexico	UA Field • Tucson, Arizona	8–1	1–0	–
2	March 8	New Mexico	UA Field • Tucson, Arizona	9–0	2–0	–
3	March 11	Pepperdine	UA Field • Tucson, Arizona	8–3	3–0	–
4	March 12	Pepperdine	UA Field • Tucson, Arizona	18–4	4–0	–
5	March 12	Pepperdine	UA Field • Tucson, Arizona	0–2	4–1	–
6	March 14	Colorado State	UA Field • Tucson, Arizona	13–4	5–1	–
7	March 15	Colorado State	UA Field • Tucson, Arizona	10–0	6–1	–
8	March 18	Colorado State College	UA Field • Tucson, Arizona	8–3	7–1	–
9	March 19	Colorado State College	UA Field • Tucson, Arizona	8–5	8–1	–
10	March 19	Colorado State College	UA Field • Tucson, Arizona	1–0	9–1	–
11	March 21	Utah	UA Field • Tucson, Arizona	12–2	10–1	2–0
12	March 22	Utah	UA Field • Tucson, Arizona	13–2	11–1	2–0
13	March 25	Cal State Los Angeles	UA Field • Tucson, Arizona	12–8	12–1	–
14	March 26	Cal State Los Angeles	UA Field • Tucson, Arizona	3–9	12–2	–
15	March 26	Cal State Los Angeles	UA Field • Tucson, Arizona	4–1	13–2	–
16	March 28	San Diego Marines	UA Field • Tucson, Arizona	6–11	13–3	–
17	March 29	San Diego Marines	UA Field • Tucson, Arizona	13–1011	14–3	–
18	March 30	Michigan	UA Field • Tucson, Arizona	12–9	15–3	–
19	March 31	Michigan	UA Field • Tucson, Arizona	9–11	15–4	–

April (20–3)

#	Date	Opponent	Site/stadium	Score	Overall record	Border record
20	April 1	Wyoming	UA Field • Tucson, Arizona	15–3	16–4	–
21	April 2	Wyoming	UA Field • Tucson, Arizona	15–1	17–4	–
22	April 2	Wyoming	UA Field • Tucson, Arizona	18–2	18–4	–
23	April 4	Sul Ross	UA Field • Tucson, Arizona	15–6	19–4	–
24	April 5	Sul Ross	UA Field • Tucson, Arizona	16–5	20–4	–
25	April 8	Air Force	UA Field • Tucson, Arizona	13–1	21–4	–
26	April 9	Air Force	UA Field • Tucson, Arizona	19–7	22–4	–
27	April 9	Air Force	UA Field • Tucson, Arizona	4–0	23–4	–
28	April 11	Iowa	UA Field • Tucson, Arizona	11–5	24–4	–
29	April 12	Iowa	UA Field • Tucson, Arizona	18–6	25–4	–
30	April 13	Iowa	UA Field • Tucson, Arizona	23–6	26–4	–
31	April 13	Iowa	UA Field • Tucson, Arizona	15–1	27–4	–
32	April 14	Iowa	UA Field • Tucson, Arizona	7–5	28–4	–
33	April 16	Iowa	UA Field • Tucson, Arizona	10–5	29–4	–
34	April 19	at Wyoming	Cowboy Field • Laramie, Wyoming	9–10	29–5	–
35	April 20	at Wyoming	Cowboy Field • Laramie, Wyoming	10–7	30–5	–
36	April 21	at Colorado State	Unknown • Fort Collins, Colorado	13–8	31–5	–
37	April 22	at Air Force	Falcon Baseball Field • Colorado Springs, Colorado	16–2	32–5	–
38	April 23	at Air Force	Falcon Baseball Field • Colorado Springs, Colorado	9–4	33–5	–
39	April 25	at New Mexico	Unknown • Albuquerque, New Mexico	16–0	34–5	–
40	April 26	at New Mexico	Unknown • Albuquerque, New Mexico	7–4	35–5	–
41	April 30	at Arizona State	Unknown • Tempe, Arizona	3–7	35–6	0–1
42	April 30	at Arizona State	Unknown • Tempe, Arizona	0–3	35–7	0–.

May (3–0)

#	Date	Opponent	Site/stadium	Score	Overall record	Border record
43	May 2	Arizona State–Flagstaff	UA Field • Tucson, Arizona	11–1	36–7	0–2
44	May 7	Arizona State	UA Field • Tucson, Arizona	6–2	37–7	1–2
45	May 7	Arizona State	UA Field • Tucson, Arizona	7–6	38–7	2–2

Postseason
NCAA District VI Playoff (3–0)

#	Date	Opponent	Site/stadium	Score	Overall record	Border record
46	June 2	Houston	UA Field • Tucson, Arizona	4–3	39–7	2–2
47	June 3	Houston	UA Field • Tucson, Arizona	6–4	40–7	2–2
48	June 4	Houston	UA Field • Tucson, Arizona	5–1	41–7	2–2

College World Series (2–2)

#	Date	Opponent	Site/stadium	Score	Overall record	Border record
49	June 10	vs Oklahoma State	Omaha Municipal Stadium • Omaha, Nebraska	2–1	42–7	2–2
50	June 15	vs Minnesota	Omaha Municipal Stadium • Omaha, Nebraska	5–8	42–8	2–2
51	June 17	vs St. John's	Omaha Municipal Stadium • Omaha, Nebraska	11–4	43–8	2–2
52	June 18	vs Southern California	Omaha Municipal Stadium • Omaha, Nebraska	1–13	43–9	2–2

== Awards and honors ==
Bill Barraclough

- Third Team All-American American Baseball Coaches Association

Alan Hall

- First Team All-American American Baseball Coaches Association

Charlie Shoemaker

- Second Team All-American American Baseball Coaches Association

Jim Ward

- College World Series All-Tournament Team
