= 1959 Clemson Tigers baseball team =

American college baseball season

1959 Clemson Tigers baseball

ACC champions District 3 champions

College World Series, 1–2
- Conference: Atlantic Coast Conference
- CB: No. 5
- Record: 24–8 (9–5 ACC)
- Head coach: Bill Wilhelm
- Home stadium: Riggs Field

1959 Atlantic Coast Conference baseball standings
	Conf.				Overall
Team	W		L	PCT	W		L	PCT
No. 5 Clemson ‍†‍‡‍^{y}	9	–	5	.643	24	–	8	.750
North Carolina ‍†‍‍	9	–	5	.643	17	–	7	.708
Wake Forest ‍†‍‍	9	–	5	.643	13	–	8	.619
Maryland ‍‍‍	7	–	6	.538	11	–	6	.647
Virginia ‍‍‍	6	–	8	.429	10	–	9	.526
South Carolina ‍‍‍	5	–	8	.385	11	–	12	.478
Duke ‍‍‍	5	–	9	.357	9	–	16	.360
NC State ‍‍‍	5	–	9	.357	8	–	12	.400
† – Conference champion ‡ – Playoff champion y – Invited to the NCAA tournament As of June 30, 1959; Rankings from Collegiate Baseball

The 1959 Clemson Tigers baseball team represented Clemson University in the 1959 NCAA University Division baseball season. The team played their home games at Riggs Field in Clemson, South Carolina.

The team was coached by Bill Wilhelm, who completed his second season at Clemson. The Tigers reached the 1959 College World Series, their second appearance in Omaha.

== Roster ==
1959 Clemson Tigers roster
Pitchers: - Ty Cline - Sophomore; - Charlie Eubanks; - Bailey Hendley - Junior; - Jimmy Roller - Junior; - Dave Sprouse; - Harold Stowe - Senior	Catchers: - Clarence E. “Butch” Coker jr - Senior; - Clayton Lowder JR. “Junior”; Infielders: - Larry Bagwell - Senior; - Zach Burnette - Junior; - Fred DeBerry - Senior; - Bud Spiers; - Dick Suggs - Sophomore; Outfielders: - Doug Hoffman - Senior	Unknown: - Reid Blakeney; - Tim Bryant; - Lou Cordileone; - Bob Dempsey; - Bobby Norris; - Sam Poe

== Schedule ==
Legend
	Clemson win
	Clemson loss
**Bold**	Clemson team member
*	Non-Conference game

1959 Clemson Tigers baseball game log
Regular season

March
Date	Opponent	Site/stadium	Score	Overall record	ACC record
Mar 23	The Citadel*	Riggs Field • Clemson, SC	**W** 8–6	1–0	
Mar 26	UMass*	Riggs Field • Clemson, SC	**W** 6–1	2–0	
Mar 27	Virginia	Riggs Field • Clemson, SC	**W** 13–1	3–0	1–0
Mar 28	vs Maryland	Orangeburg, SC	**W** 9–2	4–0	2–0
Mar 30	at Georgia*	Ag. Hill • Athens, GA	**W** 8–2	5–0	
Mar 31	Adelphi*	Riggs Field • Clemson, SC	**W** 16–8	6–0	

April
Date	Opponent	Site/stadium	Score	Overall record	ACC record
Apr 1	Wake Forest	Riggs Field • Clemson, SC	**W** 4–3	7–0	3–0
Apr 3	at South Carolina	Columbia, SC	**W** 11–0	8–0	4–0
Apr 4	at Furman*	Furman Baseball Stadium • Greenville, SC	**W** 6–4	9–0	
Apr 6	North Carolina	Riggs Field • Clemson, SC	**L** 3–6	9–1	4–1
Apr 7	NC State	Riggs Field • Clemson, SC	**L** 7–8	9–2	4–2
Apr 14	at Maryland	College Park, MD	**L** 3–7	9–3	4–3
Apr 15	at Virginia	Charlottesville, VA	**L** 3–4	9–4	4–4
Apr 24	at North Carolina	Emerson Field • Chapel Hill, NC	**W** 2–1	10–4	5–4
Apr 25	at Wake Forest	Ernie Shore Field • Winston-Salem, NC	**W** 6–5	11–4	6–4
Apr 28	Georgia*	Riggs Field • Clemson, SC	**W** 2–1	12–4	
Apr 30	at Duke	Jack Coombs Field • Durham, NC	**W** 12–7	13–4	7–4

May
Date	Opponent	Site/stadium	Score	Overall record	ACC record
May 1	at Duke	Jack Coombs Field • Durham, NC	**W** 10–0	14–4	8–4
May 2	at NC State	Riddick Stadium • Raleigh, NC	**L** 2–9	14–5	8–5
May 4	Georgia Southern*	Riggs Field • Clemson, SC	**W** 5–2	15–5	
May 5	Georgia Southern*	Riggs Field • Clemson, SC	**L** 1–2	15–6	
May 8	Furman*	Riggs Field • Clemson, SC	**W** 10–1	16–6	
May 9	at Oglethorpe*	Brookhaven, GA	**W** 6–2	17–6	
May 12	South Carolina	Riggs Field • Clemson, SC	**W** 10–1	18–6	9–5

Postseason

ACC playoffs
Date	Opponent	Site/stadium	Score	Overall record	Playoff record
May 16	Wake Forest	Thomasville, NC	**W** 4–2	19–6	1–0
May 18	North Carolina	Sims Legion Park • Gastonia, NC	**W** 9–7	20–6	2–0

NCAA District 3 Regional
Date	Opponent	Site/stadium	Score	Overall record	Regional Record
June 4	Georgia Tech	Sims Legion Park • Gastonia, NC	**W** 9–6	21–6	1–0
June 5	Florida State	Sims Legion Park • Gastonia, NC	**W** 24–2	22–6	2–0
June 6	Georgia Tech	Sims Legion Park • Gastonia, NC	**W** 5–0	23–6	3–0

NCAA College World Series
Date	Opponent	Site/stadium	Score	Overall record	CWS record
June 13	Arizona	Johnny Rosenblatt Stadium • Omaha, NE	**L** 2–3^{12}	23–7	0–1
June 14	Colorado State	Johnny Rosenblatt Stadium • Omaha, NE	**W** 7–1	24–7	1–1
June 15	Penn State	Johnny Rosenblatt Stadium • Omaha, NE	**L** 0–7	24–8	1–2
