= 1959 Penn State Nittany Lions baseball team =

University baseball team

1959 Penn State Nittany Lions baseball

College World Series, 4th
- Conference: Independent
- CB: No. 4
- Record: 17–6
- Head coach: Joe Bedenk (29th season)
- Assistant coach: Chuck Bedlar
- Captain: Bob Hoover
- Home stadium: Beaver Field

The 1959 Penn State Nittany Lions baseball team represented Pennsylvania State University in the 1959 NCAA University Division baseball season. The head coach was Joe Bedenk, serving his 29th year.

The Nittany Lions lost in the College World Series, defeated by the Oklahoma State.

== Roster ==
1959 Penn State Nittany Lions baseball team
Players
Coaches

#	Pos.	Name	B/T	Height	Weight	Year	Home town
		John Adams	/	—	—
		Bob Arner	/	—	—
		Harry Beans	/	—	—
		Larry Beighey	/	—	—
		Bill Benton	/	—	—
		Charles Caldwell	/	—	—
		Richard DeLong	/	—	—
		Tom Durbin	/	—	—
	INF	Larry Fegley	R/R	6 ft 0 in (1.83 m)	170 lb (77 kg)		Allentown, Pennsylvania
		Mike Hader	/	—	—
	INF	Bob Hoover	/	—	—
		Bob Hrobak	/	—	—
	P	Ed Kikla	/	—	—
		Richard Landis (C)	/	—	—
		Luff	/	—	—
		McSparran	/	—	—
		Ron Riese	/	—	—
		Ron Rinker	/	—	—

Head coach

Joe Bedenk

Assistant coach(es)

Chuck Medlar

Legend

- (C) Team captain
- (S) Suspended
- (I) Ineligible
- Injured
- Current redshirt

== Schedule ==
1959 Penn State Nittany Lions baseball game log
Regular season
April (7–1)

#	Date	Opponent	Site/stadium	Score	Overall record
1	April 8	Gettysburg	New Beaver Field • University Park, Pennsylvania	10–6	1–0
2	April 14	Bucknell	New Beaver Field • University Park, Pennsylvania	8–7	2–0
3	April 17	Ohio State	New Beaver Field • University Park, Pennsylvania	3–6	2–1
4	April 18	Ohio State	New Beaver Field • University Park, Pennsylvania	6–1	3–1
5	April 18	Ohio State	New Beaver Field • University Park, Pennsylvania	8–2	4–1
6	April 22	at Bucknell	Unknown • Lewisburg, Pennsylvania	2–1	5–1
7	April 25	at Georgetown	Unknown • Washington, D. C.	9–0	6–1
8	April 25	at Georgetown	Unknown • Washington, D. C.	17–3	7–1

May (6–3)

#	Date	Opponent	Site/stadium	Score	Overall record
9	May 2	Penn	New Beaver Field • University Park, Pennsylvania	10–3	8–1
10	May 5	at Navy	Unknown • Annapolis, Maryland	6–3	9–1
11	May 8	at Colgate	Unknown • Hamilton, New York	7–5	10–1
12	May 9	at Syracuse	Lew Carr Field • Syracuse, New York	6–10	10–2
13	May 9	at Syracuse	Lew Carr Field • Syracuse, New York	9–1	11–2
14	May 16	at West Virginia	Unknown • Morgantown, West Virginia	4–2	12–2
15	May 20	Pittsburgh	New Beaver Field • University Park, Pennsylvania	5–6	12–3
16	May 20	Pittsburgh	New Beaver Field • University Park, Pennsylvania	10–0	13–3
17	May 22	at Temple	Erny Field • Philadelphia, Pennsylvania	9–13	13–4

Postseason
District II Tournament (2–0)

#	Date	Opponent	Site/stadium	Score	Overall record
18	June 4	Temple	New Beaver Field • University Park, Pennsylvania	16–4	14–4
19	June 5	Ithaca	New Beaver Field • University Park, Pennsylvania	7–3	15–4

1959 College World Series (2–2)

#	Date	Opponent	Site/stadium	Score	Overall record
20	June 13	vs Connecticut	Omaha Municipal Stadium • Omaha, Nebraska	5–3	16–4
21	June 14	vs Oklahoma State	Omaha Municipal Stadium • Omaha, Nebraska	6–8	16–5
22	June 15	vs Clemson	Omaha Municipal Stadium • Omaha, Nebraska	7–0	17–5
23	June 16	vs Oklahoma State	Omaha Municipal Stadium • Omaha, Nebraska	3–4	17–6
