= 1960 USC Trojans baseball team =

American college baseball season

1960 USC Trojans baseball

CIBA Champions District 8 Champions

College World Series, Runner-Up
- Conference: California Intercollegiate Baseball Association

Ranking
- Coaches: No. 2
- CB: No. 2
- Record: 32–11 (12–4 CIBA)
- Head coach: Rod Dedeaux (19th season)
- Home stadium: Bovard Field

1960 Athletic Association of Western Universities baseball standings
| | Conf. | | | | Overall |
| Team | W | | L | PCT | W | | L | PCT |
|---|---|---|---|---|---|---|---|---|
North Division
| No. 12 Washington State ‍†‍‍^{y} | 9 | – | 2 | .818 | 29 | – | 6 | .829 |
| Oregon State ‍‍‍ | 7 | – | 5 | .583 | 18 | – | 5 | .783 |
| Oregon ‍‍‍ | 6 | – | 6 | .500 | | – | | – |
| Washington ‍‍‍ | 7 | – | 8 | .467 | 20 | – | 12 | .625 |
| Idaho ‍‍‍ | 3 | – | 11 | .214 | | – | | – |
California Intercollegiate Baseball Association
| No. 2 Southern California ‍†‍‍^{y} | 12 | – | 4 | .750 | 32 | – | 11 | .744 |
| No. 16 California ‍†‍‍ | 12 | – | 4 | .750 | 30 | – | 14 | .682 |
| Santa Clara ‍‍‍ | 6 | – | 10 | .375 | | – | | – |
| Stanford ‍‍‍ | 6 | – | 10 | .375 | 20 | – | 17 | .541 |
| UCLA ‍‍‍ | 4 | – | 12 | .250 | 18 | – | 29 | .383 |
† – Conference champion y – Invited to the NCAA tournament As of June 30, 1960; Rankings from Collegiate Baseball

The 1960 USC Trojans baseball team represented the University of Southern California in the 1960 NCAA University Division baseball season. The Trojans played their home games at Bovard Field. The team was coached by Rod Dedeaux in his 19th season at USC.

The Trojans lost the College World Series, defeated by the Minnesota Golden Gophers in the championship game.

== Roster ==
1960 USC Trojans roster
| Pitchers: Bruce Gardner - Senior; Pete Kenney; Marcel Lachemann; Jim Withers; Ken Yaryan | Catchers: Bill Heath - Senior; Infielders: Steve Bach; William Ryan - Sophomore; Tom Satriano; Ron Stillwell - Junior | Outfielders: Art Ersepke - Junior; Mike Gillespie; Bob Levingston - Sophomore; Mickey McNamee - Junior |

== Schedule and results ==
Legend
| USC win |
| USC loss |
| USC tie |

1960 USC Trojans baseball game log
Regular season (23–8)

March (7–2)
| Date | Opponent | Site/stadium | Score | Overall record | CIBA record |
|---|---|---|---|---|---|
| March 2 | Occidental | Bovard Field • Los Angeles, California | 8–4 | 1–0 | – |
| March 11 | at Fresno State | Unknown • Fresno, California | 5–2 | 2–0 | – |
| March 12 | at Fresno State | Unknown • Fresno, California | 3–1 | 3–0 | – |
| March 18 | Cal Poly SLO | Bovard Field • Los Angeles, California | 7–9 | 3–1 | – |
| March 18 | at Long Beach State | Bovard Field • Long Beach, California | 15–8 | 4–1 | – |
| March 22 | UC Santa Barbara | Bovard Field • Los Angeles, California | 8–0 | 5–1 | – |
| March 24 | BYU | Bovard Field • Los Angeles, California | 13–4 | 6–1 | – |
| March 25 | Fresno State | Bovard Field • Los Angeles, California | 5–3 | 7–1 | – |
| March 26 | Fresno State | Bovard Field • Los Angeles, California | 3–6 | 7–2 | – |

April (9–3)
| Date | Opponent | Site/stadium | Score | Overall record | CIBA record |
|---|---|---|---|---|---|
| April 1 | Santa Clara | Bovard Field • Los Angeles, California | 5–2 | 8–2 | 1–0 |
| April 2 | Santa Clara | Bovard Field • Los Angeles, California | 20–2 | 9–2 | 2–0 |
| April 11 | vs San Diego State | Unknown • Unknown | 3–2 | 10–2 | 2–0 |
| April 13 | vs New Mexico | Unknown • Unknown | 15–1 | 11–2 | 2–0 |
| April 14 | vs UCLA | Unknown • Unknown | 5–4 | 12–2 | 2–0 |
| April 14 | vs Fresno State | Unknown • Unknown | 3–13 | 12–3 | 2–0 |
| April 19 | Cal State Los Angeles | Bovard Field • Los Angeles, California | 8–4 | 13–3 | 2–0 |
| April 22 | at Santa Clara | Washington Field • Santa Clara, California | 4–5 | 13–4 | 2–1 |
| April 23 | at Stanford | Sunken Diamond • Stanford, California | 4–2 | 14–4 | 3–1 |
| April 23 | at Stanford | Sunken Diamond • Stanford, California | 2–3 | 14–5 | 3–2 |
| April 29 | California | Bovard Field • Los Angeles, California | 8–6 | 15–5 | 4–2 |
| April 30 | California | Bovard Field • Los Angeles, California | 4–1 | 16–5 | 5–2 |

May (8–3)
| Date | Opponent | Site/stadium | Score | Overall record | CIBA record |
|---|---|---|---|---|---|
| May 2 | Pepperdine | Bovard Field • Los Angeles, California | 3–4 | 16–6 | 5–2 |
| May 3 | at UCLA | Joe E. Brown Field • Los Angeles, California | 5–2 | 17–6 | 6–2 |
| May 6 | at UCLA | Joe E. Brown Field • Los Angeles, California | 0–4 | 17–7 | 6–3 |
| May 7 | UCLA | Bovard Field • Los Angeles, California | 9–3 | 18–7 | 7–3 |
| May 10 | UCLA | Bovard Field • Los Angeles, California | 13–2 | 19–7 | 8–3 |
| May 13 | at Santa Clara | Washington Field • Santa Clara, California | 7–6 | 20–7 | 9–3 |
| May 14 | at California | Evans Diamond • Berkeley, California | 9–1 | 21–7 | 10–3 |
| May 14 | at California | Evans Diamond • Berkeley, California | 5–7 | 21–8 | 10–4 |
| May 17 | Cal Poly Pomona | Bovard Field • Los Angeles, California | 10–6 | 22–8 | 10–4 |
| May 20 | Stanford | Bovard Field • Los Angeles, California | 9–3 | 23–8 | 11–4 |
| May 21 | Stanford | Bovard Field • Los Angeles, California | 19–6 | 24–8 | 12–4 |

Postseason (8–3)

District 8 playoff (4–1)
| Date | Opponent | Site/stadium | Score | Overall record | CIBA record |
|---|---|---|---|---|---|
| May 28 | Pepperdine | Bovard Field • Los Angeles, California | 10–3 | 25–8 | 12–4 |
| May 30 | Pepperdine | Bovard Field • Los Angeles, California | 10–3 | 26–6 | 12–4 |
| June 3 | Washington State | Bovard Field • Los Angeles, California | 7–8 | 26–9 | 12–4 |
| June 4 | Washington State | Bovard Field • Los Angeles, California | 8–3 | 27–9 | 12–4 |
| June 4 | Washington State | Bovard Field • Los Angeles, California | 10–5 | 28–9 | 12–4 |

1960 College World Series (4–2)
| Date | Opponent | Site/stadium | Score | Overall record | CIBA record |
|---|---|---|---|---|---|
| June 14 | vs St. John's | Johnny Rosenblatt Stadium • Omaha, Nebraska | 3–1 | 29–9 | 12–4 |
| June 16 | vs Boston College | Johnny Rosenblatt Stadium • Omaha, Nebraska | 5–2 | 30–9 | 12–4 |
| June 17 | vs Minnesota | Johnny Rosenblatt Stadium • Omaha, Nebraska | 11–12 | 30–10 | 12–4 |
| June 18 | vs Arizona | Johnny Rosenblatt Stadium • Omaha, Nebraska | 13–1 | 31–10 | 12–4 |
| June 19 | vs Minnesota | Johnny Rosenblatt Stadium • Omaha, Nebraska | 4–3 | 32–10 | 12–4 |
| June 20 | vs Minnesota | Johnny Rosenblatt Stadium • Omaha, Nebraska | 1–2 | 32–11 | 12–4 |

Schedule source:

== Awards and honors ==
William Ryan

- All Tournament Team

Bob Levingston

- All Tournament Team

Mickey McNamee

- All Tournament Team

Art Ersepke

- All Tournament Team
- 1st Team All-CIBA

Bill Heath

- All Tournament Team
- ABCA 2nd team

Bruce Gardner

- All Tournament Team
- ABCA 1st team
- 1st Team All-CIBA

Tom Satriano

- ABCA 2nd team

Steve Bach

- 1st Team All-CIBA

Mike Gillespie

- Honorable Mention All-CIBA

Ron Stillwell

- Honorable Mention All-CIBA
