= Danny Doyle (baseball) =

American baseball player (1917–2004)

- Catcher
- Born: January 24, 1917; McLoud, Oklahoma, U.S.
- Died: December 14, 2004 (aged 87); Stillwater, Oklahoma, U.S.
- Batted: Both Threw: Right

MLB debut
- September 14, 1943, for the Boston Red Sox

Last MLB appearance
- October 3, 1943, for the Boston Red Sox

MLB statistics
- Batting average: .209
- Home runs: 0
- Runs batted in: 6
- Stats at Baseball Reference

Teams
- Boston Red Sox (1943)

Howard James "Danny" Doyle (January 24, 1917 – December 14, 2004) was an American catcher in Major League Baseball who played briefly for the Boston Red Sox during the 1943 season. Listed at 6 ft 1 in (1.85 m), 195 lb. Doyle was a switch-hitter and threw right-handed. He was born in McLoud, Oklahoma.

Doyle attended Oklahoma State University, where he earned seven letters – four in basketball and three in baseball. He entered the majors in August 1943 with the Red Sox, appearing in 13 games while hitting a .209 batting average (9-for-43) with six RBI, two runs, and one double without home runs.

After that, Doyle enrolled the United States Army Air Forces during World War II and never appeared in a major league game again. He served from 1944 to 1946 and received a service related disability that would keep him from playing again. Then, he returned to Oklahoma State and worked as an assistant coach before becoming the basketball and baseball coach at Auburn University from 1947 to 1949.

Doyle became a successful scout for the Boston Red Sox almost continuously since 1949 (he spent one season, 1965, as a scout for the New York Yankees). Some of his signings included Jim Lonborg, Roger Clemens and Ellis Burks. In 1988, he was named MLB's National Scout of the Year. He also was a member of the Oklahoma State University Baseball Hall of Fame. In March 2009 Doyle was named the "Best Athlete to wear #24 in Oklahoma State history" by GoPokes magazine.

Doyle died in Stillwater, Oklahoma, at the age of 87.
