= 1959 NCAA University Division baseball tournament =

American college sports championship

- Season: 1959
- Teams: 22
- Finals site: Johnny Rosenblatt Stadium; Omaha, NE
- Champions: Oklahoma State (1st title)
- Runner-up: Arizona (4th CWS Appearance)
- Winning coach: Toby Greene (1st title)
- MOP: Jim Dobson (Oklahoma State)

The 1959 NCAA University Division baseball tournament was played at the end of the 1959 NCAA University Division baseball season to determine the national champion of college baseball. The tournament concluded with eight teams competing in the College World Series, a double-elimination tournament in its thirteenth year. Eight regional districts sent representatives to the College World Series with preliminary rounds within each district serving to determine each representative. These events would later become known as regionals. Each district had its own format for selecting teams, resulting in 22 teams participating in the tournament at the conclusion of their regular season, and in some cases, after a conference tournament. The College World Series was held in Omaha, NE from June 12 to June 18. The thirteenth tournament's champion was Oklahoma State, coached by Toby Greene. The Most Outstanding Player was Jim Dobson of Oklahoma State.

== Tournament ==
- The official NCAA record book does not list any participants for District 1 as Connecticut was an automatic qualifier for the 1959 College World Series.

=== District 1 ===
- Connecticut (automatic qualifier)

=== District 2 ===
Games played at University Park, Pennsylvania.

First Round
Penn State	16
Temple	4
Ithaca	4
Pittsburgh	3^{11}

Final
Penn State	7
Ithaca	3

=== District 3 ===
Games played at Gastonia, North Carolina.

Upper round 1
Clemson	9
Georgia Tech	6
Florida State	3
George Washington	2^{10}
Lower round 1
Georgia Tech	7
George Washington	2

Upper final
Clemson	24
Florida State	2
Lower final
Florida State	16
Georgia Tech	9

Final
Clemson	5	—
Florida State	0	—

=== District 4 ===
Games played at Notre Dame, Indiana.

Upper round 1
Minnesota	6
Western Michigan	4
Notre Dame	10
Detroit	0
Lower round 1
Western Michigan	4
Detroit	0

Upper final
Minnesota	4
Notre Dame	12
Lower final
Minnesota	1
Western Michigan	5

Final
Notre Dame	0^{10}	6
Western Michigan	2	9

=== District 5 ===
Games played at Peoria, Illinois.

Finals
Oklahoma State	7	6	—
Bradley	6	2	—

=== District 6 ===
Games played at Bryan, Texas.

Finals
Arizona	1	1	—
Texas A&M	0	0	—

=== District 7 ===
Games played at Greeley, Colorado.

Finals
Colorado State College	17	8	12
Utah	8	13	8

=== District 8 ===
Semifinals; Fresno, California				Finals; Seattle, Washington
				Fresno State	3	4	10
Santa Clara	11	3	—	Washington	2	5	5
Fresno State	23	15	—

== College World Series ==
=== Participants ===
School	Conference	Record (conference)	Head coach	CWS appearances	CWS best finish	CWS record
Arizona	Border	36–8 (6–1)	Frank Sancet	4 (last: 1958)	2nd (1956)	7–8
Clemson	ACC	23 –6 (11–5)	Bill Wilhelm	1 (last: 1958)	5th (1958)	1–2
Colorado State College (Note: Colorado State College is currently known as the University of Northern Colorado. Not to be confused with Colorado State University, then known as Colorado A&M.)	RMC	24–5 (10–1)	Pete Butler	5 (last: 1958)	5th (1955)	2–10
Connecticut	Yankee	20–1 (10–0)	J. Orlean Christian	1 (last: 1957)	5th (1957)	1–2
Fresno State	CCAA	38–11 (11–4)	Pete Beiden	0 (last: none)	none	0–0
Oklahoma State	Big 8	22–4 (17–3)	Toby Greene	2 (last: 1955)	3rd (1955)	5–4
Penn State	Independent	15–4	Joe Bedenk	2 (last: 1957)	2nd (1957)	5–4
Western Michigan	MAC	24–7 (8–2)	Charlie Maher	3 (last: 1958)	2nd (1955)	7–6

=== Bracket and results ===
==== 1959 College World Series bracket ====
Upper round 1
Oklahoma State	10
Western Michigan	2
Penn State	5
Connecticut	3
Arizona	3^{12}
Clemson	2
Fresno State	6
Colorado State College	5

Upper round 2
Oklahoma State	8
Penn State	6
Arizona	5
Fresno State	1
Lower round 1
Clemson	7
Colorado State College	1
Western Michigan	14
Connecticut	6

Upper final
Oklahoma State	3
Arizona	5
Lower round 2
Penn State	7
Clemson	0
Fresno State	7
Western Michigan	2

Semifinals
Oklahoma State	4
Penn State	3
Fresno State	2
Arizona	0

Preliminary final
Oklahoma State	4
Fresno State	0

Final
Oklahoma State	5
Arizona	3

==== Game results ====
Date	Game	Winner	Score	Loser	Notes
June 12	Game 1	Oklahoma State	10–2	Western Michigan	
June 13	Game 2	Penn State	5–3	Connecticut	
June 13	Game 3	Arizona	3–2 (12 innings)	Clemson	
June 13	Game 4	Fresno State	6–5	Colorado State College	
June 14	Game 5	Western Michigan	14–6	Connecticut	Connecticut eliminated
June 14	Game 6	Clemson	7–1	Colorado State College	Colorado State College eliminated
June 14	Game 7	Oklahoma State	8–6	Penn State	
June 14	Game 8	Arizona	5–1	Fresno State	
June 15	Game 9	Penn State	7–0	Clemson	Clemson eliminated
June 15	Game 10	Fresno State	7–2	Western Michigan	Western Michigan eliminated
June 15	Game 11	Arizona	5–3	Oklahoma State	
June 16	Game 12	Oklahoma State	4–3	Penn State	Penn State eliminated
June 16	Game 13	Fresno State	2–0	Arizona	
June 17	Game 14	Oklahoma State	4–0	Fresno State	Fresno State eliminated
June 18	Final	Oklahoma State	5–3	Arizona	Oklahoma State wins CWS

=== All-Tournament Team ===
The following players were members of the All-Tournament Team.

Position	Player	School
P	Joel Horlen	Oklahoma State
P	Hal Stowe	Clemson
C	Alan Hall	Arizona
1B	Bob Wilson	Arizona
2B	Bruce Andrew	Oklahoma State
3B	Jim Dobson (MOP)	Oklahoma State
SS	Charles Shoemaker	Arizona
OF	Bailey Hendley	Clemson
OF	Doug Hoffman	Clemson
OF	Connie McIlvoy	Oklahoma State

=== Quick facts ===
- In 1996, coach Rod Dedeaux of Southern California was named to the College World Series All-Time Team (1947–95) by the Omaha World-Herald as part of the 50th CWS celebration.
- In 1971, Ron Fairly (OF) of Southern California was named to the College World Series All-Time Team (1947–70) by the blue-ribbon committee chaired by Abe Chanin as part of the 25th CWS celebration.
- In 1996, Alan Hall (C) of Arizona and Charles Shoemaker (SS) of Arizona were named to the 1940s–50s All-Decade Team by a panel of 60 voters representing CWS head coaches, media, and chairs of the Division I Baseball Committee.
- Fresno State's team included Augie Garrido, who went on to win five CWS titles as a coach at Cal State Fullerton and Texas.
- Dave Baldwin of Arizona pitched a two-hitter in a 5–1 victory over Fresno State.
- 33,607 fans watched the CWS (10 sessions).
- The championship game was umpired by Bob Stewart, Jack Tobin, Don Carrothers, and Ed Sudol.
- The following records were set or tied:
  - Most Balks, Individual, Single Game – 2, Frank Carbajal, Colorado State College, vs Clemson, L 7–1, tied (2 others)
  - Most Passed Balls, Individual, Single Game – 3, Jim Garrett, Fresno St, vs Arizona, L 5–1, tied (2 others)
  - Most Balks, Team, Single Game – 2, Colorado State, vs Clemson, L 7–1, tied (4 others)
  - Most Passed Balls, Team, Single Game – 5, Fresno St, vs Arizona, L 5–1
  - Most Passed Balls, Both Teams, Single Game – 5, Fresno St (5) vs Arizona (0), Arizona 5–1
  - Most Balks, Individual, CWS – 2, Frank Carbajal, 1 game, tied (6 others)
  - Most Sacrifice Bunts, Both Teams, Championship Game – 5, Oklahoma St (3) vs Arizona (2), Oklahoma St 5–3
  - Most Runs by Team, Clemson- 24

== See also ==
- 1959 NCAA College Division baseball tournament
- 1959 NAIA World Series
