= Don Wallace =

American baseball player (born 1940)

- Second baseman
- Born: August 25, 1940; Sapulpa, Oklahoma
- Batted: Left Threw: Right

MLB debut
- April 12, 1967, for the California Angels

Last MLB appearance
- June 3, 1967, for the California Angels

MLB statistics
- Batting average: .000
- Games: 23
- At-bats: 6

Teams
- California Angels (1967)

Donald Allen Wallace (born August 25, 1940) is a former Major League Baseball player. Wallace played 23 games with the California Angels in the 1967 season. He had six at-bats, without a hit. He attended Oklahoma State University.
