= Charlie Shoemaker =

American baseball player (1939-1990)

- Second baseman
- Born: August 10, 1939; Los Angeles, California, U.S.
- Died: May 31, 1990 (aged 50); Mount Penn, Pennsylvania, U.S.
- Batted: Left Threw: Right

MLB debut
- September 9, 1961, for the Kansas City Athletics

Last MLB appearance
- July 26, 1964, for the Kansas City Athletics

MLB statistics
- Batting average: .258
- Home runs: 0
- Runs batted in: 4
- Stats at Baseball Reference

Teams
- Kansas City Athletics (1961–1962, 1964)

Charles Landis Shoemaker (August 10, 1939 – May 31, 1990) was an American professional baseball player. A native of Los Angeles, he appeared as a second baseman in parts of three Major League Baseball seasons (1961–1962; 1964) for the Kansas City Athletics. He batted left-handed, threw right-handed, stood 5 feet 10 inches (1.78 m) tall and weighed 155 pounds (70 kg).

Shoemaker attended high school in Montebello, California, where he was a top athlete, and then the University of Arizona. He led Arizona to second place at the College World Series in 1959 and third in 1960. He was a three time All-American. In 1961, he attained the rare distinction of earning All-American honors at two different positions (shortstop and second base). Over his college career, he led the Wildcats in at bats, hits, triples and stolen bases. He was named to the 1950s All-Decade Team and inducted to the University of Arizona Hall of Fame in 1991. At the time of his induction, he still held the team record for triples in a season (12) and in a career (31) and was fifth in strike-out/at-bat ratio for a season, having struck out only six times in 1961. Upon graduation, his coach, Frank Sancet, called him the best college infielder he had ever seen.

Shoemaker signed with the Athletics in 1961. After batting .271 in 82 games played for the Class A Portsmouth-Norfolk Tides of the Sally League, he was recalled by the A's that September. He started in six games at second and pinch hit in a seventh, and had four multi-hit games. In his Major League debut, Shoemaker collected ten hits in 28 at bats, including two doubles, for a .385 average. However, in his next two MLB trials — in 1962 and 1964 — he batted .206 (13 for 63), and the final seven years of his career (1965–1971) were spent exclusively in minor league baseball.

Charlie Shoemaker died in Mount Penn, Pennsylvania, of a self-inflicted gunshot wound at the age of 50 on May 31, 1990.
