= Jim Dobson (baseball) =

American baseball player

- Third baseman
- Born: April 2, 1939
- Died: February 26, 2018 (aged 78)
- Batted: Right Threw: Right

Career highlights and awards
- College World Series Most Outstanding Player (1959)

James Winford Dobson (April 2, 1939 – February 26, 2018) was a baseball player who played third base. He won the 1959 College World Series Most Outstanding Player award while a sophomore at Oklahoma State University.

He spent two years playing baseball professionally, never reaching the majors. He hit 14 home runs with 65 RBI in the minors. He died on February 26, 2018.
