= Dick Siebert =

American baseball player (1912–1978)

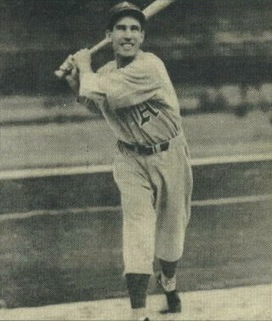
- First baseman
- Born: February 19, 1912; Fall River, Massachusetts, U.S.
- Died: December 9, 1978 (aged 66); Minneapolis, Minnesota, U.S.
- Batted: Left Threw: Left

MLB debut
- September 7, 1932, for the Brooklyn Dodgers

Last MLB appearance
- September 23, 1945, for the Philadelphia Athletics

MLB statistics
- Batting average: .282
- Home runs: 32
- Runs batted in: 482
- Stats at Baseball Reference

Teams
- Brooklyn Dodgers (1932, 1936); St. Louis Cardinals (1937–1938); Philadelphia Athletics (1938–1945)

Career highlights and awards
- All-Star (1943)

Richard Walther Siebert (February 19, 1912 – December 9, 1978) was an American first baseman in Major League Baseball who had an 11-year career from 1932, 1936–1945. He played for the Brooklyn Dodgers and St. Louis Cardinals, both of the National League, and the Philadelphia A's of the American League. He was elected to the American League All-Star team in 1943.

Born in Fall River, Massachusetts, he grew up in Cass Lake and Saint Paul, Minnesota.

In an 11-year major league career, Siebert compiled a .282 batting average (1104-3917), scoring 439 runs, with 32 home runs and 482 RBI in 1035 games played. His on-base percentage was .332 and slugging percentage was .379. Primarily a first baseman, he recorded a .990 fielding percentage.

Following his playing career, Siebert became head baseball coach at the University of Minnesota in 1948, where he would remain until his death. The "Chief" went on to become one of the greatest coaches in college baseball history and helped develop baseball at all levels in Minnesota. He finished with a 754–361–6 record and a .676 winning percentage, far and away the most in school history at the time; he has since been passed by current coach John Anderson. He sent five different teams to the College World Series and brought home three NCAA titles in 1956, 1960 and 1964. His teams also captured 12 Big Ten titles, and he endured only three losing seasons.

In addition to coaching the Minnesota Gophers, during the 1950s Siebert was a player/coach for the Litchfield Optimists, the Willmar Rails, and the Minneapolis Kopps Realty teams in Minnesota amateur Town Team Baseball. This arrangement allowed Siebert to evaluate talent and coach his Gophers players during the collegiate off-season.

Siebert served as the president of the American College Baseball Coaches Association. Among his many honors and accolades, Siebert was twice named as college baseball's Coach of the Year, was a member of the College Baseball Hall of Fame, and was a recipient of college baseball's highest award, the Lefty Gomez Trophy, which recognizes an individual who has made an outstanding contribution and given service to the development of college baseball.

Siebert died on December 9, 1978, at University Hospitals in Minneapolis. He was buried in Lakewood Cemetery. His son, Paul Siebert, pitched for the Astros, Padres and Mets from 1974 to 1978. On April 21, 1979, Minnesota renamed its baseball stadium Siebert Field in Siebert's honor.
