= 1955 Oklahoma A&M Aggies baseball team =

American college baseball season

1955 Oklahoma A&M Aggies baseball

Missouri Valley champions Missouri Valley Tournament champions District V champions

College World Series, 3rd
- Conference: Missouri Valley Conference
- Record: 27–3 (8–0 MVC)
- Head coach: Toby Greene (12th season)

1955 Missouri Valley Conference baseball standings
	Conf.				Overall
Team	W		L	PCT	W		L	PCT
Oklahoma A&M ‍†‍‍^{y}	8	–	0	1.000	27	–	3	.900
Saint Louis ‍‍‍	3	–	2	.600		–		–
Detroit ‍‍‍	2	–	2	.500	8	–	9	.471
Bradley ‍‍‍	2	–	3	.400	16	–	5	.762
Houston ‍‍‍	3	–	5	.375	6	–	13	.316
Tulsa ‍‍‍	3	–	6	.333	6	–	12	.333
Wichita State ‍‍‍	3	–	6	.333	4	–	9	.308
† – Conference champion y – Invited to the College World Series; As of June 30, 1955; Rankings from Coaches' Poll

The 1955 Oklahoma A&M Aggies baseball team represented the Oklahoma Agricultural and Mechanical College in the 1955 NCAA baseball season. The team was coached by Toby Greene in his 12th year at Oklahoma A&M.

The Aggies won the District V Playoff to advance to the College World Series, where they were defeated by the Wake Forest Demon Deacons.

== Roster ==
1955 Oklahoma A&M Aggies baseball team
Players
Coaches

#	Pos.	Name	B/T	Height	Weight	Year	Home town
		Larry Allen	/	—	—
	P	Don Anderson	/	—	—
2		Fred Babb	R/	5 ft 9 in (1.75 m)	170 lb (77 kg)
		Don Bacon	/	—	—
	OF	Ronnie Bennett	L/R	5 ft 8 in (1.73 m)	175 lb (79 kg)		Stillwater, Oklahoma
		Don Booher	/	—	—
	LHP	Tom Borland	L/L	6 ft 3 in (1.91 m)	172 lb (78 kg)		McAlester, Oklahoma
		Val Dixon	/	—	—
		Fred Duval	/	—	—
19	INF	Phil Finegan	L/L	6 ft 2 in (1.88 m)	190 lb (86 kg)		Tulsa, Oklahoma
		Bob Garrett	/	—	—
		Jim Green	/	—	—
		Mayo Hemperly	/	—	—
		Hayden Karn	/	—	—
		Jim Kingsolver	/	—	—
	RHP	Kenneth Kinnamon	R/R	6 ft 4 in (1.93 m)	185 lb (84 kg)
		Gary Johnston	/	—	—
		Jerry Patrick	/	—	—
		Jim Remy	/	—	—
	INF	Jim Woolard	R/R	6 ft 0 in (1.83 m)	172 lb (78 kg)		Heavener, Oklahoma

Head coach

Toby Greene

Assistant coach(es)

Legend

- (C) Team captain
- (S) Suspended
- (I) Ineligible
- Injured
- Current redshirt

Roster
Last update: February 12, 2021

== Schedule ==
1955 Oklahoma A&M Aggies baseball game log
Regular season
March (4–0)

#	Date	Opponent	Site/stadium	Score	Overall record	MVC record
1	March 21	at Rice	Rice Baseball Field • Houston, Texas	17–1	1–0	–
2	March 22	at Rice	Rice Baseball Field • Houston, Texas	13–4	2–0	–
3	March 24	at Sam Houston State	Unknown • Huntsville, Texas	8–4	3–0	–
4	March 30	at Sam Houston State	Unknown • Huntsville, Texas	6–1	4–0	–

April (13–0)

#	Date	Opponent	Site/stadium	Score	Overall record	MVC record
5	April 2	vs Oklahoma	•	10–9	5–0	–
6	April 5	vs Oklahoma	•	6–1	6–0	–
7	April 12	vs Oklahoma	•	10–6	7–0	–
8	April 15	at Missouri	Rollins Field • Columbia, Missouri	4–3	8–0	–
9	April 16	at Missouri	Rollins Field • Columbia, Missouri	10–7	9–0	–
10	April 18	at Kansas	Unknown • Lawrence, Kansas	16–7	10–0	–
11	April 19	at Kansas	Unknown • Lawrence, Kansas	5–4	11–0	–
12	April	Arkansas	•	12–1	12–0	–
13	April	Arkansas	•	7–1	13–0	–
14	April 26	vs Oklahoma	•	7–3	14–0	–
15	April 29	Wichita State	Unknown • Stillwater, Oklahoma	23–1	15–0	1–0
16	April 30	Wichita State	Unknown • Stillwater, Oklahoma	34–2	16–0	2–0
17	April 30	Wichita State	Unknown • Stillwater, Oklahoma	19–2	17–0	3–0

May (5–0)

#	Date	Opponent	Site/stadium	Score	Overall record	MVC record
18	May 6	Tulsa	•	5–4	18–0	4–0
19	May 7	Tulsa	•	9–2	19–0	5–0
20	May 7	Tulsa	•	9–1	20–0	6–0
21	May 13	Houston	•	10–2	21–0	7–0
22	May 14	Houston	•	8–5	22–0	8–0

Postseason
District V Playoff (2–1)

#	Date	Opponent	Site/stadium	Score	Overall record	MVC record
23		at Oklahoma	Unknown • Norman, Oklahoma	0–3	22–1	8–0
24		at Oklahoma	Unknown • Norman, Oklahoma	6–3	23–1	8–0
25		at Oklahoma	Unknown • Norman, Oklahoma	6–2	24–1	8–0

College World Series (3–2)

#	Date	Opponent	Site/stadium	Score	Overall record	MVC record
26	June 10	vs Springfield	Omaha Municipal Stadium • Omaha, Nebraska	5–1	25–1	8–0
27	June 12	vs Western Michigan	Omaha Municipal Stadium • Omaha, Nebraska	4–5	25–2	8–0
28	June 13	vs Colgate	Omaha Municipal Stadium • Omaha, Nebraska	4–2	26–2	8–0
29	June 14	vs Arizona	Omaha Municipal Stadium • Omaha, Nebraska	5–4	27–2	8–0
30	June 15	vs Wake Forest	Omaha Municipal Stadium • Omaha, Nebraska	0–2	27–3	8–0

== Awards and honors ==
Ronnie Bennett

- First Team All-American American Baseball Coaches Association

Tom Borland

- First Team All-American American Baseball Coaches Association
- College World Series Most Outstanding Player
- College World Series All-Tournament Team
