= 1955 College Baseball All-America Team =

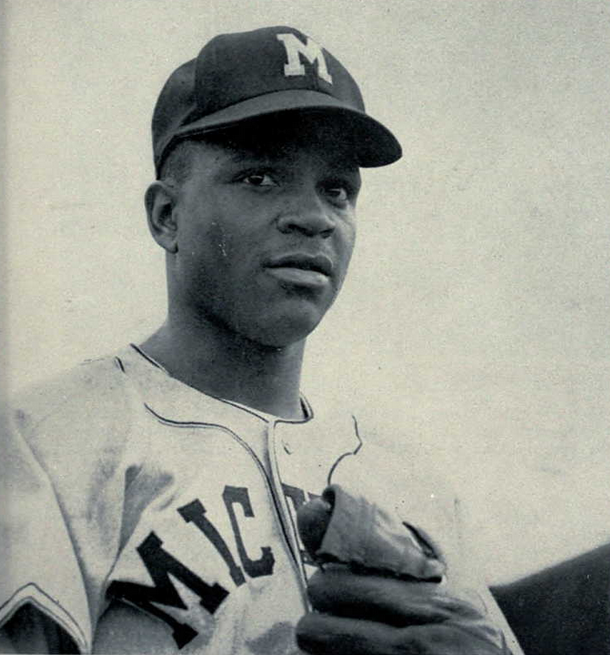
1955 All-Americans included Chicago Cubs third baseman Don Eaddy.

This is a list of college baseball players named first team All-Americans for the 1955 NCAA baseball season. From 1947 to 1963, the American Baseball Coaches Association was the only generally recognized All-America selector, so any player selected by the ABCA is considered a "consensus" All-American.

== Key ==
A	American Baseball Coaches Association
	Member of the National College Baseball Hall of Fame
	Consensus All-American – selected the ABCA

== All-Americans ==
Position	Name	School	#	A	Other awards and honors
Pitcher	Tom Borland	Oklahoma A&M	1	✓	College World Series Most Outstanding Player
Pitcher	Carl Thomas	Arizona	1	✓	
Catcher	Linwood Holt	Wake Forest	1	✓	
First baseman	Jay Dean	Oregon State	1	✓	
Second baseman	Leroy Getchell	Springfield	1	✓	
Shortstop	Bob Jingling	Wyoming	1	✓	
Third baseman	Don Eaddy	Michigan	1	✓	
Outfielder	Ronnie Bennett	Oklahoma A&M	1	✓	
Outfielder	Ted Carrangele	Colgate	1	✓	
Outfielder	Bill Lajoie	Western Michigan	1	✓	

== See also ==
- List of college baseball awards
