= 1955 Colgate Red Raiders baseball team =

American college baseball season

1955 Colgate Red Raiders baseball

College World Series, 4th
- Conference: Independent
- Record: 17–8–1
- Head coach: Red O'Hora (6th season)
- Captains: Bruce Dursema; Leonard Kraus Jr.

The 1955 Colgate Red Raiders baseball team is a baseball team that represented Colgate University in the 1955 NCAA baseball season. They were led by sixth-year head coach Red O'Hora. The Red Raiders qualified for the District 2 Tournament, where they would win a spot in the 1955 College World Series, where they finished fourth.

== Roster ==
1955 Colgate Raiders baseball team
Players
Coaches

#	Pos.	Name	B/T	Height	Weight	Year	Home town
		Joe Aceti	/	—	—
		Ron Barr	/	—	—
13	LHP	Larry Bossidy	L/L	—	—	So
	OF	Ted Carangelo	R/	—	—		Swampscott, Massachusetts
	INF	Bruce Dursema	L/	—	—		Ramsey, New Jersey
	RHP	George Fishburn	/R	—	—
	LHP	Sam Frankel	/L	—	—
		Garcia	/	—	—
		Chuck Garivaltis	/	—	—
23	C	Pete Hopkins	/	—	—
		Huther	/	—	—
		Johnston	/	—	—
		Leonard Kraus, Jr.	/	—	—
		Lewis	/	—	—
		Guy Martin	/	—	—
		Frank Nardulli	/	—	—	Jr
	INF	Tony Nicotera	/	—	—	So
		Purple	/	—	—
	INF	Al Simpson	/	—	—
		Treese	/	—	—
		Van Note	/	—	—
		Jim Varian	P/	—	—
		Tom Vivona	P/	—	—
		Vreeland	/	—	—

Head coach

25 Red O'Hora

Assistant coach(es)

Legend

- (C) Team captain
- (S) Suspended
- (I) Ineligible
- Injured
- Current redshirt

== Schedule ==
1955 Colgate Red Raiders baseball game log
Regular season
April (9–3)

#	Date	Opponent	Site/stadium	Score	Overall record
1	April 2	at Virginia	Unknown • Charlottesville, Virginia	5–15	0–1
2	April 3	at Virginia	Unknown • Charlottesville, Virginia	8–4	1–1
3	April	at North Carolina	Emerson Field • Chapel Hill, North Carolina	6–5	2–1
4	April	vs Washington and Lee	Unknown • Lexington, Virginia	8–4	3–1
5	April 9	at Gettysburg	Unknown • Gettysburg, Pennsylvania	0–6	3–2
6	April	Fordham	Unknown • Hamilton, New York	1–4	3–3
7	April 16	at Princeton	Unknown • Princeton, New Jersey	8–4	4–3
8	April	vs Hobert	Unknown • Unknown	6–5	5–3
9	April	vs Lehigh	Unknown • Unknown	7–3	6–3
10	April	vs Lafayette	Unknown • Unknown	5–4	7–3
11	April	vs Holy Cross	Unknown • Unknown	5–2	8–3
12	April	vs RPI	Unknown • Unknown	11–0	9–3

May (5–3–1)

#	Date	Opponent	Site/stadium	Score	Overall record
13	May	vs St. Lawrence	Unknown • Unknown	6–10	9–4
14	May	vs Syracuse	Unknown • Unknown	19–2	10–4
15	May	vs Army	Unknown • Unknown	8–8	10–4–1
16	May	vs Clarkson	Unknown • Unknown	9–4	11–4–1
17	May 18	at Bucknell	Unknown • Lewisburg, Pennsylvania	8–0	12–4–1
18	May 20	Penn State	Unknown • Hamilton, New York	5–6	12–5–1
19	May 21	Rutgers	Unknown • Hamilton, New York	9–4	13–5–1
20	May	vs Ithaca	Unknown • Unknown	10–9	14–5–1
21	May	vs Syracuse	Unknown • Unknown	2–3	14–6–1

Postseason
District 2 Tournament (2–0)

#	Date	Opponent	Site/stadium	Score	Overall record
22	June 3	vs Penn State	Breadon Field • Allentown, Pennsylvania	7–4	15–6–1
23	June 4	vs Ithaca	Breadon Field • Allentown, Pennsylvania	7–6	16–6–1

1955 College World Series (2–2)

#	Date	Opponent	Site/stadium	Score	Overall record
24	June 10	vs Wake Forest	Johnny Rosenblatt Stadium • Omaha, Nebraska	0–1	16–7–1
25	June 12	vs USC	Johnny Rosenblatt Stadium • Omaha, Nebraska	0–1	17–7–1
26	June 13	vs Oklahoma A&M	Johnny Rosenblatt Stadium • Omaha, Nebraska	2–4	17–8–1
