= 1955 NCAA baseball tournament =

American college sports championship

- Season: 1955
- Teams: 25
- Finals site: Johnny Rosenblatt Stadium; Omaha, Nebraska, U.S.
- Champions: Wake Forest (1st title)
- Runner-up: Western Michigan (2nd CWS Appearance)
- Winning coach: Taylor Sanford (1st title)
- MOP: Tom Borland (Oklahoma A&M)

The 1955 NCAA baseball tournament was played at the end of the 1955 NCAA baseball season to determine the national champion of college baseball. The tournament concluded with eight teams competing in the College World Series, a double-elimination tournament in its ninth year. Eight regional districts sent representatives to the College World Series with preliminary rounds within each district serving to determine each representative. These events would later become known as regionals. Each district had its own format for selecting teams, resulting in 25 teams participating in the tournament at the conclusion of their regular season, and in some cases, after a conference tournament.

The College World Series was held in Omaha, Nebraska from June 10 to June 16. The ninth tournament's champion was Wake Forest, coached by Taylor Sanford. The Most Outstanding Player was Tom Borland of Oklahoma A&M.

== Tournament ==
=== District 1 ===
Games played in Springfield, Massachusetts.

Semi-Finals
Springfield	4
Boston College	3
Massachusetts	1
Holy Cross	0

Finals
Springfield	17
Massachusetts	6

=== District 2 ===
Games played in Allentown, Pennsylvania.

Semi-Finals
Colgate	7
Penn State	4
Ithaca	5
Lafayette	0

Finals
Colgate	7
Ithaca	6

=== District 3 ===
District 3 consisted of two separate 3-game series. The first series was played between Wake Forest and Rollins, with the winner moving on to play West Virginia in a three-game series. The winner of that series moved on to the College World Series.

Games played at Morgantown, West Virginia.

Semifinal				Final
				Wake Forest	5	7	6
Rollins	0	2	–	West Virginia	1	9	5
Wake Forest	4	6	–

=== District 4 ===
District 4 consisted of two separate 3-game series. The first series was played between Alma and Western Michigan, with the winner moving on to play Ohio State in a three-game series. The winner of that series moved on to the College World Series.

Games played in Kalamazoo, Michigan.

Semifinal				Final
				Western Michigan	1	5	7
Alma	9	0	4	Ohio State	0^{10}	8	5
Western Michigan	8	3	15

=== District 5 ===
Games played in Norman, Oklahoma.

Finals
Oklahoma A&M	0	6	6
Oklahoma	3	3	2

=== District 6 ===
Games played in Tucson, Arizona.

Finals
Texas A&M	2	5	1
Arizona	6	0	2

=== District 7 ===
Games played in Greeley, Colorado.

Finals
Wyoming	8	13	5
Colorado State College	17	7	12

=== District 8 ===
District 8 consisted of two tiers of play. The first tier was a four-team double-elimination tournament with the winner moving on to play Southern California in a three-game series. The winner of that series moved onto the College World Series.

Games played in Fresno, California.

First Round
Fresno State	6
Willamette	3
San Jose State	9
Pepperdine	2
Lower round 1
Willamette	11
Pepperdine	14

Semi-Finals
Fresno St.	1
San Jose State	3
Lower final
Fresno State	8
Pepperdine	7

Finals
San Jose State	4	1
Fresno State	9	5

Games played in Los Angeles.

Finals
Fresno State	2	2	-
Southern California	11	15	-

== College World Series ==
=== Participants ===
School	Conference	Record (conference)	Head coach	CWS appearances	CWS best finish	CWS record
Arizona	Border	41–6 (6–0)	Frank Sancet	1 (last: 1954)	6th (1954)	1–2
Colgate	Independent	16–6–1	Red O'Hora	0 (last: none)	none	0–0
Colorado State College (Note: Colorado State College is currently known as the University of Northern Colorado. Not to be confused with Colorado State University, then known as Colorado A&M.)	RMC	24–2 (10–0)	Pete Butler	2 (last: 1953)	7th (1953)	0–4
Oklahoma A&M	MVC	24–1 (8–0)	Toby Greene	1 (last: 1954)	4th (1954)	2–2
Springfield	Independent	14–5	Archie Allen	1 (last: 1951)	5th (1951)	1–2
Southern California	CIBA	30–8 (14–2)	Rod Dedeaux	3 (last: 1951)	1st (1948)	5–5
Wake Forest	ACC	24–6 (11–3)	Taylor Sanford	1 (last: 1949)	2nd (1949)	2–2
Western Michigan	MAC	22–5 (9–0)	Charlie Maher	1 (last: 1952)	3rd (1952)	2–2

=== Bracket and Results ===
Upper round 1
Oklahoma A&M	5
Springfield	1
Western Michigan	4
Arizona	1
Colorado State College	2
Southern California	1
Wake Forest	1
Colgate	0

Upper round 2
Oklahoma A&M	4
Western Michigan	5
Colorado State College	0
Wake Forest	10
Lower round 1
Springfield	0
Arizona	6
Southern California	4
Colgate	6

Upper final
Western Michigan	9
Wake Forest	0
Lower round 2
Colorado State College	0
Arizona	20
Oklahoma A&M	4
Colgate	2

Semifinals
Western Michigan	7
Wake Forest	10
Arizona	4
Oklahoma A&M	5^{12}

Preliminary final
Wake Forest	2
Oklahoma A&M	0

Final
Western Michigan	6
Wake Forest	7

==== Game results ====
Date	Game	Winner	Score	Loser	Notes
June 10	Game 1	Oklahoma A&M	5–1	Springfield	
June 10	Game 2	Western Michigan	4–1	Arizona	
June 10	Game 3	Colorado State College	2–1	Southern California	
June 10	Game 4	Wake Forest	1–0	Colgate	
June 12	Game 5	Arizona	6–0	Springfield	Springfield eliminated
June 12	Game 6	Colgate	6–4	Southern California	Southern California eliminated
June 12	Game 7	Western Michigan	5–4	Oklahoma A&M	
June 12	Game 8	Wake Forest	10–0	Colorado State College	
June 13	Game 9	Arizona	20–0	Colorado State College	Colorado State College eliminated
June 13	Game 10	Oklahoma A&M	4–2	Colgate	Colgate eliminated
June 13	Game 11	Western Michigan	9–0	Wake Forest	
June 14	Game 12	Oklahoma A&M	5–4 (12 innings)	Arizona	Arizona eliminated
June 14	Game 13	Wake Forest	10–7	Western Michigan	
June 15	Game 14	Wake Forest	2–0	Oklahoma A&M	Oklahoma A&M eliminated
June 16	Final	Wake Forest	7–6	Western Michigan	Wake Forest wins CWS

=== Tournament Notes ===
- In 1996, coach Rod Dedeaux of USC was named to the College World Series All-Time Team (1947–95) by the Oklahoma World-Herald as part of the 50th CWS celebration.
- In 1996, Tom Borland of Oklahoma A&M, now known as Oklahoma State, was named to the 1940s-50s All-Decade Team by a panel of 60 voters representing CWS head coaches, media, and chairs of the Division I Baseball Committee.
- Freed Messner of Western Michigan hit the only pinch-hit grand slam home run in CWS history in the top of the 8th of Game 13 in a 10–7 loss to Wake Forest. It was also Messner's only hit of the CWS (1-12).
- Two-hitters were pitched by: Lawrence Bossidy of Colgate in a 1–0 loss to Wake Forest; Carl Thomas of Arizona in a 6–0 defeat of Springfield; Ken Kinnamon and Don Anderson of Oklahoma A&M in a 5–4 loss to Western Michigan; and Sam Frankel and Lawrence Bossidy of Colgate in a 4–2 loss to Oklahoma A&M.
- Wake Forest's championship was the last time that a member of the Atlantic Coast Conference won the CWS until the University of Virginia in 2015.
- 21,843 fans watched the CWS (10 sessions).
- The championship game was umpired by Walter Doyle, Walter Harbour, George Hametz, and John Hergert.
- The following records were set or tied:
  - Most Stolen Bases, Team, CWS - 17, Oklahoma A&M, 5 games
  - Most Shutouts, All Teams, CWS - 6, Arizona (2), Wake Forest (3), Western Michigan, tied
  - Most Doubles, Individual, Single Game - 3, Jack Bryant, 2B, Wake Forest, tied (6 others)
  - Most Sacrifice Bunts, Individual, Single Game - 3, Leland Davis, SS, Western Michigan, tied
  - Most Stolen Bases, Team, Single Game - 7, Wake Forest, tied (4 others)
  - Fewest Assists, Team, Single Game - 3, Oklahoma A&M, tied (6 others)
  - Most Errors, Team, Single Game - 9, Colorado State College, tied
  - Most Shutouts, Team, CWS - 3, Wake Forest, 6 games
