= 1955 USC Trojans baseball team =

American college baseball season

1955 USC Trojans baseball

CIBA Champions PCC Tournament Champions District VIII Champions

College World Series, T-7th
- Conference: California Intercollegiate Baseball Association
- Record: 23–5 (12–3 CIBA)
- Head coach: Rod Dedeaux (14th season)
- Home stadium: Bovard Field

1955 Pacific Coast Conference baseball standings
	Conf.						Overall
Team	W		L		T	PCT	W		L		T	PCT
North Division
Oregon ‍†‍‍	10	–	3	–	0	.769	18	–	8	–	0	.692
Oregon State ‍‍‍	8	–	4	–	0	.667	15	–	10	–	0	.600
Washington State ‍‍‍	6	–	4	–	0	.600	13	–	8	–	1	.614
Washington ‍‍‍	7	–	7	–	0	.500	18	–	11	–	0	.621
Idaho ‍‍‍	0	–	13	–	0	.000	9	–	15	–	0	.375
California Intercollegiate Baseball Association
USC ‍†‍‍^{y}	12	–	3	–	0	.800	23	–	5	–	0	.821
UCLA ‍‍‍	9	–	6	–	0	.600	22	–	9	–	1	.703
Stanford ‍‍‍	9	–	7	–	0	.563	21	–	13	–	0	.618
California ‍‍‍	7	–	8	–	0	.467	17	–	16	–	0	.515
Santa Clara ‍‍‍	1	–	14	–	0	.067	11	–	19	–	0	.367
† – Conference champion y – Invited to the NCAA tournament

The 1955 USC Trojans baseball team represented the University of Southern California in the 1955 NCAA baseball season. The Trojans played their home games at Bovard Field. The team was coached by Rod Dedeaux in his 14th year at USC.

The Trojans won the California Intercollegiate Baseball Association championship, the Pacific Coast Conference Tournament, and the District VIII Playoff to advance to the College World Series, where they were defeated by the Colgate Red Raiders.

== Roster ==
1955 USC Trojans baseball team
Players
Coaches

#	Pos.	Name	B/T	Height	Weight	Year	Home town
		Robert Burdick	/	—	—	Sr
	INF	Bill Faddis	/	—	—	Jr
	C	John Garten	/	—	—	Sr
		Bob Gerst	/	—	—	Jr
	INF	Kent Hadley	L/L	6 ft 3 in (1.91 m)	190 lb (86 kg)	Jr	Pocatello, Idaho
	C	Dick Harris	L/R	5 ft 11 in (1.8 m)	185 lb (84 kg)
		Kenneth Hoeck	/	—	—
	RHP	Vic Lapiner	R/R	6 ft 0 in (1.83 m)	203 lb (92 kg)	Sr
		Jack Lovrich	/	—	—	Sr
		Carl Maggio	/	—	—
	OF	Gerry Mason	/	—	—
		Fred Olson	/	—	—	So
	INF	Jim Oros	/	—	—	Sr
	P	Ralph Pausig	/	—	—
	INF	Buddy Pritchard	R/R	6 ft 1 in (1.85 m)	195 lb (88 kg)		Bell, California
	OF	Gary Robin	R/R	5 ft 9 in (1.75 m)	170 lb (77 kg)	Sr	Albany, California
	OF	Tony Santino	/	—	—	Jr
	INF	Jerry Siegert	L/L	6 ft 0 in (1.83 m)	175 lb (79 kg)	So	Los Angeles, California
	INF	John Stevenson	/	—	—	Sr
		Larry Yeths	/	—	—
	P	Marty Zuanich	/	—	—	Jr

Head coach

Rod Dedeaux

Assistant coach(es)

Legend

- (C) Team captain
- (S) Suspended
- (I) Ineligible
- Injured
- Current redshirt

== Schedule ==
1955 USC Trojans baseball game log
Regular season
March (3–1)

#	Date	Opponent	Site/stadium	Score	Overall record	CIBA record
1	March 19	UCLA	Bovard Field • Los Angeles, California	6–10	0–1	0–1
2	March 21	Loyola Marymount	Bovard Field • Los Angeles, California	17–4	1–1	0–1
3	March 25	Stanford	Bovard Field • Los Angeles, California	8–1	2–1	1–1
4	March 26	Stanford	Bovard Field • Los Angeles, California	7–4	3–1	2–1

April (10–0)

#	Date	Opponent	Site/stadium	Score	Overall record	CIBA record
5	April 1	BYU	Bovard Field • Los Angeles, California	23–5	4–1	2–1
6	April 4	at San Diego State	Unknown • San Diego, California	7–2	5–1	2–1
7	April 8	California	Bovard Field • Los Angeles, California	13–7	6–1	3–1
8	April 9	California	Bovard Field • Los Angeles, California	18–4	7–1	4–1
9	April 12	Pacific	Bovard Field • Los Angeles, California	29–5	8–1	4–1
10	April 15	at Santa Clara	Unknown • Santa Clara, California	24–2	9–1	5–1
11	April 16	at California	Edwards Field • Berkeley, California	5–3	10–1	6–1
12	April 16	at California	Edwards Field • Berkeley, California	13–1	11–1	7–1
13	April 26	Santa Barbara	Bovard Field • Los Angeles, California	12–6	12–1	7–1
14	April 29	Santa Clara	Bovard Field • Los Angeles, California	11–0	13–1	8–1

May (6–2)

#	Date	Opponent	Site/stadium	Score	Overall record	CIBA record
15	May 4	Pepperdine	Bovard Field • Los Angeles, California	19–0	14–1	8–1
16	May 6	UCLA	Bovard Field • Los Angeles, California	14–8	15–1	9–1
17	May 7	at UCLA	Joe E. Brown Field • Los Angeles, California	7–1	16–1	10–1
18	May 10	Loyola Marymount	Bovard Field • Los Angeles, California	14–2	17–1	10–1
19	May 13	at Santa Clara	Unknown • Santa Clara, California	13–7	18–1	11–1
20	May 14	at Stanford	Sunken Diamond • Stanford, California	8–6	19–1	12–1
21	May 14	at Stanford	Sunken Diamond • Stanford, California	2–3	19–2	12–2
22	May 17	at UCLA	Joe E. Brown Field • Los Angeles, California	4–18	19–3	12–3

Postseason
Pacific Coast Conference Tournament (2–0)

#	Date	Opponent	Site/stadium	Score	Overall record	CIBA record
23	May 27	Oregon	Bovard Field • Los Angeles, California	7–1	20–3	12–3
24	May 28	Oregon	Bovard Field • Los Angeles, California	10–1	21–3	12–3

District VIII Playoff (2–0)

#	Date	Opponent	Site/stadium	Score	Overall record	CIBA record
25	June 3	Fresno State	Bovard Field • Los Angeles, California	11–2	22–3	12–3
26	June 4	Fresno State	Bovard Field • Los Angeles, California	15–2	23–3	12–3

College World Series (0–2)

#	Date	Opponent	Site/stadium	Score	Overall record	CIBA record
27	June 10	vs Colorado State	Omaha Municipal Stadium • Omaha, Nebraska	1–2	23–4	12–3
28	June 12	vs Colgate	Omaha Municipal Stadium • Omaha, Nebraska	4–6	23–5	12–3

== Awards and honors ==
John Garten

- Third Team All-American American Baseball Coaches Association
- Second Team All-CIBA

Kent Hadley

- First Team All-CIBA

Vic Lapiner

- First Team All-CIBA

Gerry Mason

- Second Team All-American American Baseball Coaches Association
- First Team All-CIBA

James Oros

- Second Team All-CIBA

Ralph Pausig

- Second Team All-CIBA

Gary Robin

- Second Team All-CIBA

Tony Santino

- First Team All-CIBA

John Stevenson

- Second Team All-CIBA
