= 1955 Colorado State Bears baseball team =

American college baseball season

1955 Colorado State Bears baseball

Rocky Mountain Conference champions District VII playoff champions

College World Series, T-5th
- Conference: Rocky Mountain Conference
- Record: 25–4 (10–0 RMC)
- Head coach: Pete Butler (13th season)
- Home stadium: Jackson Field

1955 Rocky Mountain Conference baseball standings
	Conf.				Overall
Team	W		L	PCT	W		L	PCT
Colorado State ‍†‍‍^{y}	10	–	0	1.000	25	–	4	.862
Western State ‍‍‍	2	–	2	.500		–		–
Colorado Mines ‍‍‍	2	–	6	.250	3	–	8	.273
Colorado College ‍‍‍	2	–	8	.200	4	–	8	.333
† – Conference champion y – Invited to the College World Series; As of June 30, 1955; Rankings from Collegiate Baseball

The 1955 Colorado State Bears baseball team represented Colorado State College of Education in the 1955 NCAA baseball season. The Bears played their home games at Jackson Field. The team was coached by Pete Butler in his 13th year at Colorado State.

The Bears won the District VII playoff to advance to the College World Series, where they were defeated by the Arizona Wildcats.

== Roster ==
1955 Colorado State Bears baseball team
Players
Coaches

#	Pos.	Name	B/T	Height	Weight	Year	Home town
		Les Charles	/	—	—
	INF	Wayne Coates	/	—	—
	RHP	Bob Gill	/R	—	—
	C	Kent Hill	/R	—	—
	P	John Hogg	/	—	—
		Quinten Hoien	/L	—	—
		Bob Kardula	/R	—	—
	OF	Ward Lee	/	—	—
	INF	Mike Lucas	R/L	6 ft 0 in (1.83 m)	196 lb (89 kg)		Sterling, Colorado
	INF	Manuel Martinez	/R	—	—
	C	Jerry McMillen	/R	—	—
32	OF	Del Peterson	/R	6 ft 0 in (1.83 m)	—
		George Sage	/L	—	—
		Don Stern	/	—	—
	C	Dick Weed	/R	—	—
		Willie Wright	/R	—	—

Head coach

Pete Butler

Assistant coach(es)

Legend

- (C) Team captain
- (S) Suspended
- (I) Ineligible
- Injured
- Current redshirt

== Schedule ==
1955 Colorado State Bears baseball game log
Regular season
April (12–0)

#	Date	Opponent	Site/stadium	Score	Overall record	RMC record
1	April 1	at Colorado Mines	Unknown • Golden, Colorado	11–2	1–0	1–0
2	April 2	Colorado Mines	Jackson Field • Greeley, Colorado	8–0	2–0	2–0
3	April 8	Colorado A&M	Jackson Field • Greeley, Colorado	11–4	3–0	2–0
4	April 9	at Colorado A&M	Colorado Field • Fort Collins, Colorado	5–4	4–0	2–0
5	April 15	Colorado College	Jackson Field • Greeley, Colorado	9–7	5–0	3–0
6	April 16	Colorado College	Jackson Field • Greeley, Colorado	10–0	6–0	4–0
7	April 19	Warren Air Force Base	Jackson Field • Greeley, Colorado	7–1	7–0	4–0
8	April 22	at Wyoming	Unknown • Laramie, Wyoming	15–4	8–0	4–0
9	April 23	Wyoming	Jackson Field • Greeley, Colorado	9–7	9–0	4–0
10	April 26	Denver	Jackson Field • Greeley, Colorado	10–6	10–0	4–0
11	April 29	at Colorado Mines	Unknown • Golden, Colorado	13–8	11–0	5–0
12	April 30	Colorado Mines	Jackson Field • Greeley, Colorado	5–3	12–0	6–0

May (10–1)

#	Date	Opponent	Site/stadium	Score	Overall record	RMC record
13	May 3	Warren Air Force Base	Jackson Field • Greeley, Colorado	13–0	13–0	5–0
14	May 6	at Western State	Unknown • Gunnison, Colorado	16–3	14–0	6–0
15	May 7	at Western State	Unknown • Gunnison, Colorado	12–2	15–0	8–0
16	May 10	Fort Carson	Jackson Field • Greeley, Colorado	7–4	16–0	8–0
17	May 13	at Colorado College	Stewart Field • Colorado Springs, Colorado	14–9	17–0	9–0
18	May 14	at Colorado College	Stewart Field • Colorado Springs, Colorado	19–4	18–0	10–0
19	May 17	at Denver	Unknown • Denver, Colorado	10–5	19–0	10–0
20	May 20	at Fitzsimons Army Medical Center	Unknown • Aurora, Colorado	13–0	20–0	10–0
21	May 21	at Fitzsimons Army Medical Center	Unknown • Aurora, Colorado	9–0	21–0	10–0
22	May 24	Warren Air Force Base	Jackson Field • Greeley, Colorado	2–5	21–1	10–0
23	May 27	Fort Carson	Jackson Field • Greeley, Colorado	25–7	22–1	10–0

Postseason
District VII Playoff (2–1)

#	Date	Opponent	Site/stadium	Score	Overall record	RMC record
24	June	Wyoming	Jackson Field • Greeley, Colorado	17–6	23–1	10–0
25	June	Wyoming	Jackson Field • Greeley, Colorado	7–13	23–2	10–0
26	June	Wyoming	Jackson Field • Greeley, Colorado	12–5	24–2	10–0

College World Series (1–2)

#	Date	Opponent	Site/stadium	Score	Overall record	RMC record
27	June 10	vs Southern California	Omaha Municipal Stadium • Omaha, Nebraska	2–1	25–2	10–10
28	June 11	vs Wake Forest	Omaha Municipal Stadium • Omaha, Nebraska	0–10	25–3	10–0
29	June 12	vs Arizona	Omaha Municipal Stadium • Omaha, Nebraska	0–20	25–4	10–0
