= Toby Greene (baseball) =

American college baseball coach (1899–1967)

Biographical details
- Born: March 29, 1899; Humphrey, Missouri, U.S.
- Died: October 3, 1967 (aged 68); Stillwater, Oklahoma, U.S.
- Education: Phillips (1924)

Playing career

Football
- c. 1920: Phillips

Baseball
- c. 1920: Phillips

Coaching career (HC unless noted)

Football
- 1926: Bartlesville HS (OK) (assistant)
- 1927–1928: Phillips (assistant)
- 1929–1932: Phillips
- 1933–1934: Oklahoma City (assistant)
- 1935–1937: Oklahoma City
- 1939–?: Oklahoma State (assistant)

Basketball
- 1933–1936: Oklahoma City

Baseball
- 1942–1964: Oklahoma State

Head coaching record
- Overall: 22–36–4 (college football); 18–26 (college basketball); 318–132 (college baseball)

Theodore Elwood "Toby" Greene (March 29, 1899 – October 2, 1967) was an American college baseball coach. He led the Oklahoma State Cowboys baseball team to the national championship in the 1959 College World Series.

== Early life ==
Greene was born in 1899 at Humphrey, in Sullivan County, Missouri but moved with his parents to Thomas, Oklahoma in 1902. He enrolled at Phillips University in Enid, Oklahoma in 1918, where he enlisted in the Student Army Training Corps, a World War I program. Greene later became a multi-sport athlete, excelling in baseball and football for the Haymakers. He graduated from Phillips in 1924 after playing alongside future New York Giants coach Steve Owen.

== Coaching career ==
Greene began his coaching career in 1924 as a baseball coach at Sayre High School in Sayre, Oklahoma. He remained there for two years before moving to Bartlesville High School in Bartlesville, Oklahoma for one year. He then became all-sports coach at Phillips.

Greene later coached at Oklahoma City University before becoming a football assistant at Oklahoma A&M in 1939. In 1942, he added head baseball coach to his duties. Greene coached the team for 22 seasons, only one of which saw a record below .500. Greene earned seven district championships and eight conference titles to go with his national championship in 1959.

== Death ==
Greene died on October 3, 1967, at his home in Stillwater, Oklahoma.

== Head coaching record ==
=== College football ===
Year	Team	Overall	Conference	Standing	Bowl/playoffs
Phillips Haymakers (Big Four Conference) (1929–1932)
1929	Phillips	4–4–3	1–3–1	4th	
1930	Phillips	6–3	1–2	3rd	
1931	Phillips	1–5	0–3	4th	
1932	Phillips	3–7	0–3	4th	
Phillips:		14–19–3	2–11–1		
Oklahoma City Goldbugs (Independent) (1935–1937)
1935	Oklahoma City	3–4–1			
1936	Oklahoma City	4–4			
1937	Oklahoma City	1–9			
Oklahoma City:		8–17–1			
Total:		22–36–4			

=== College basketball ===
Record table
Season	Team	Overall	Conference	Standing	Postseason
Oklahoma City Goldbugs (Independent) (1932–1935)
1932–33	Oklahoma City	1–11			
1933–34	Oklahoma City	8–8			
1934–35	Oklahoma City	9–7			
Oklahoma City:		18–26 (.409)			
Total:		18–26 (.409)			

=== College baseball ===
The following table depicts Greene's record as a head coach.

Record table
Season	Team	Overall	Conference	Standing	Postseason
Oklahoma A&M Cowboys (Missouri Valley Conference) (1942–1956)
1942	Oklahoma A&M	6–5			
1943	Oklahoma A&M	4–3			
1946	Oklahoma A&M	15–2			
1947	Oklahoma A&M	11–5	11–5	1st	District Playoffs
1948	Oklahoma A&M	20–6	20–6	1st	Western Playoff
1949	Oklahoma A&M	22–6	5–0	1st	Region C Playoff
1950	Oklahoma A&M	15–7	6–3	2nd	
1951	Oklahoma A&M	9–8	2–4	5th	
1952	Oklahoma A&M	15–5	5–2	2nd	
1953	Oklahoma A&M	13–4	4–2	T-2nd	
1954	Oklahoma A&M	18–11	8–1	1st	CWS
1955	Oklahoma A&M	27–3	8–0	1st	CWS
1956	Oklahoma A&M	11–10	7–2	2nd	
Oklahoma A&M (MVC):		186–75	76–25		
Oklahoma A&M/State Cowboys (Big Eight Conference) (1957–1964)
1957	Oklahoma A&M	12–3	7–2	2nd	
1958	Oklahoma State	17–6	13–5	2nd	
1959	Oklahoma State	27–5	17–3	1st	CWS Champions
1960	Oklahoma State	17–7	12–4	1st	CWS
1961	Oklahoma State	27–3	18–1	1st	CWS
1962	Oklahoma State	11–9	10–6	2nd	
1963	Oklahoma State	15–10	12–9	5th	
1964	Oklahoma State	6–14	4–12	7th	
Oklahoma State (Big 8):		132–57	93–42		
Total:		312–132			
National champion Postseason invitational champion Conference regular season champion Conference regular season and conference tournament champion Division regular season champion Division regular season and conference tournament champion Conference tournament champion
