= Red O'Hora =

American baseball player and coach

Playing career

Football
- 1933, 1935–1936: Penn State

Baseball
- 1934–1936: Penn State
- 1938: Trenton Senators

Coaching career (HC unless noted)

Football
- 1946: Bangor HS (PA)
- 1947: Easton Area HS (PA)
- 1949–1959: Colgate (assistant)

Baseball
- 1948–1949: Colgate (assistant)
- 1950–1972: Colgate

Head coaching record
- Overall: 238–198–4
- Tournaments: NCAA: 1–2

Frank James "Red" O'Hora is an American former baseball coach and player. He played college baseball for Penn State for coach Joe Bedenk from 1934 to 1936 before playing professionally from 1938. He then served as the head baseball coach of the Colgate Red Raiders from 1950 to 1972, leading the Red Raiders to a fourth-place finish in the 1955 College World Series.

O'Hora served as the head football coach of Bangor High School and Easton Area High School. On June 1, 1949, O'Hora was named the successor to Eppie Barnes as the head baseball coach of the Colgate Red Raiders.

== Head coaching record ==
Record table
Season	Team	Overall	Conference	Standing	Postseason
Colgate Red Raiders (Independent) (1950–1972)
1950	Colgate	8–9			
1951	Colgate				
1952	Colgate				
1953	Colgate	8–2			
1954	Colgate	11–5			
1955	Colgate	17–8–1			College World Series
1956	Colgate	14–8			
1957	Colgate	8–14			
1958	Colgate	7–8			
1959	Colgate	11–8			
1960	Colgate	17–9			
1961	Colgate	13–9			
1962	Colgate				
1963	Colgate				
1964	Colgate				
1965	Colgate				
1966	Colgate				
1967	Colgate				
1968	Colgate				
1969	Colgate				
1970	Colgate				
1971	Colgate				
1972	Colgate				
Colgate:		238–198–4			
Total:		238–198–4			
National champion Postseason invitational champion Conference regular season champion Conference regular season and conference tournament champion Division regular season champion Division regular season and conference tournament champion Conference tournament champion
