= Taylor Sanford =

American basketball player and coach

Biographical details
- Born: November 21, 1908; Hampton, Virginia, U.S.
- Died: August 8, 1966 (aged 57); Petersburg, Virginia, U.S.
- Education: Richmond, 1929

Playing career
- 1925–1929: Richmond
- Position: First baseman

Coaching career (HC unless noted)

Baseball
- 1929–1942: Hargrave Military Academy
- 1942–1949: Randolph–Macon
- 1951–1955: Wake Forest

Football
- 1949–1953, 1955: Wake Forest (assistant)

Administrative career (AD unless noted)
- 1942–1949: Randolph–Macon
- 1959–1966: Fort Lee

Accomplishments and honors

Championships
- 1955 College World Series

Awards
- ABCA Coach of the Year, 1955

Taylor H. Sanford (November 11, 1908 – August 8, 1966) was an American baseball player, coach, and college athletics administrator. He served as the head baseball coach at Randolph–Macon College from 1942 to 1949 and at Wake Forest University from 1951 to 1955. He led the Wake Forest Demon Deacons baseball team to the 1955 College World Series championship. Sanford's Demon Deacons also made up the United States national team at several Pan American Games.

== Early life ==
Sanford was born to Dr. and Mrs. T. Ryland Sanford in Hampton, Virginia. He later attended Hargrave Military Academy where he was an all-state athlete in football, basketball and baseball. He then enrolled at the University of Richmond.

== Playing career ==
Sanford was captain of the Richmond Spiders football, basketball, and baseball teams, and set school records in the shot put and discus. He then played baseball professionally in the Bi-State and Piedmont leagues while also coaching prep and college teams. He ended his professional career in 1946, having never climbed higher than Class B.

He was listed as a scout for the New York Yankees of Major League Baseball in 1948.

== Coaching career ==
Sanford began his coaching career at Hargrave, coaching for thirteen years at the prep school. He became athletic director and coach of the baseball and basketball teams at Randolph–Macon. His teams won a total of five conference championships over his seven years in Ashland, Virginia, before moving to Wake Forest as freshman football coach. In his second year at Wake Forest, he added baseball to his coaching duties while continuing in various assistant coaching roles with the football team. Most notably, the Deacs won the Atlantic Coast Conference and College World Series in 1955.

Sanford also headed the Wake Forest team when it was selected as the representative United States national team at the 1951 Pan American Games in Buenos Aires, Argentina. The Wake Forest team, which was the first U.S. national team to participate in international competition since the 1942 Amateur World Series, took the silver medal.

During the College World Series, a rainout forced a game on Sunday, sparking a small controversy at the Baptist school when word reached Wake Forest. This followed word that Sanford would not be kept full-time after the 1956 season and little recognition from the school of his achievement in Omaha. Sanford therefore resigned from Wake Forest on January 31, 1956, citing his "feeling of insecurity" and that he had "no assurance that I will have a job after the current season is over."

== Later life and death ==
Sanford returned to Virginia after stepping down at Wake Forest, and served as athletic director at Fort Lee. He died on August 8, 1966, in Petersburg, Virginia. In 1977, Sanford was inducted into the Virginia Sports Hall of Fame.

== Head coaching record ==
Record table
| Season | Team | Overall | Conference | Standing | Postseason |
|---|---|---|---|---|---|
Wake Forest Demon Deacons (Southern Conference) (1951–1953)
| 1951 | Wake Forest | 16–7 | | | |
| 1952 | Wake Forest | 13–12 | | | |
| 1953 | Wake Forest | 15–5 | | | |
Wake Forest Demon Deacons (Atlantic Coast Conference) (1954–1955)
| 1954 | Wake Forest | 13–9 | 8–7 | 4th | |
| 1955 | Wake Forest | 29–7 | 11–3 | 1st | College World Series |
| Wake Forest: | | 42–16 | 19–10 | | |
| Total: | | 86–40 | | | |
National champion Postseason invitational champion Conference regular season champion Conference regular season and conference tournament champion Division regular season champion Division regular season and conference tournament champion Conference tournament champion
