= Wake Forest Demon Deacons baseball =

American college baseball team

Wake Forest Demon Deacons
- 2026 Wake Forest Demon Deacons baseball team
- Founded: 1891 (134 years ago)
- Overall record: 2167–1638–28
- University: Wake Forest University
- Athletic director: John Currie
- Head coach: Tom Walter (17th season)
- Conference: ACC; Atlantic Division
- Location: Winston-Salem, North Carolina
- Home stadium: David F. Couch Ballpark (capacity: 3,823)
- Nickname: Demon Deacons
- Colors: Old gold and black

College World Series champions
- 1955

College World Series runner-up
- 1949

College World Series appearances
- 1949, 1955, 2023

NCAA regional champions
- 1999, 2017, 2023

NCAA tournament appearances
- 1949, 1955, 1962, 1963, 1977, 1998, 1999, 2000, 2001, 2002, 2007, 2016, 2017, 2022, 2023, 2024, 2025, 2026

Conference tournament champions
- Atlantic Coast Conference: 1962, 1963, 1977, 1998, 1999, 2001

Conference regular season champions
- Southern Conference : 1949; Atlantic Coast Conference: 1955, 1962, 1963, 2023

The Wake Forest Demon Deacons baseball team represents Wake Forest University in NCAA Division I college baseball. The program competes in the Atlantic Coast Conference (ACC). They won the 1955 College World Series. They are coached by Tom Walter.

== History ==
The Demon Deacon program began play in 1891.

The Demon Deacons represented the United States in baseball at the 1951 Pan American Games, winning the silver medal. In 1955, the Demon Deacons, led by coach Taylor Sanford, defeated Western Michigan to clinch the 1955 College World Series championship. In 1977, Outfielder Kenny Baker became the first Demon Deacon to win ACC Player of the Year.

The Demon Deacons have been crowned ACC tournament champions four times: 1977, 1998, 1999, and 2001. In 2010, Tom Walter was hired as Wake Forest's new head coach.

== David F. Couch Ballpark ==
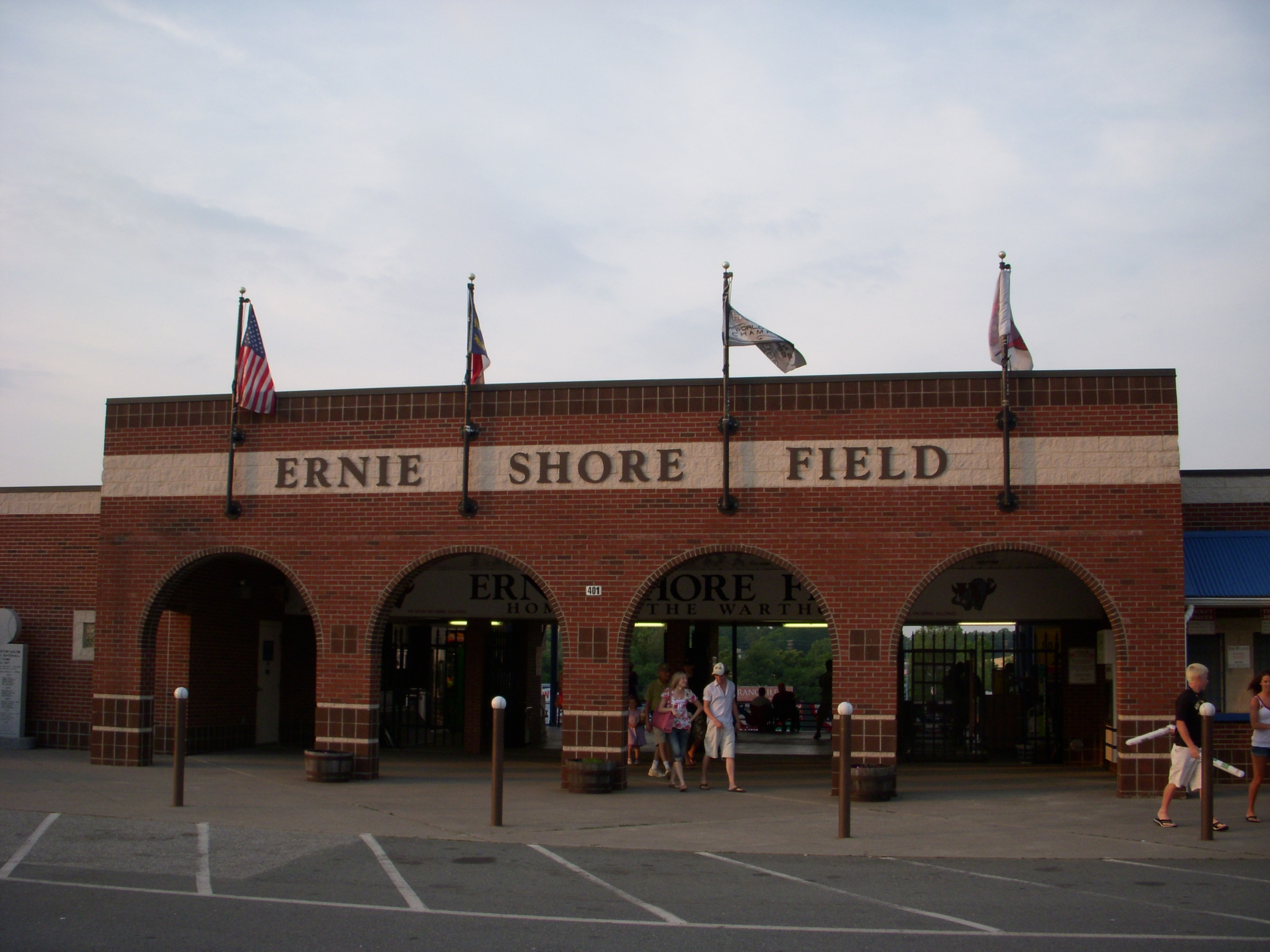
David F. Couch Ballpark, formally named Ernie Shore Field

On October 31, 2007, Wake Forest University bought Ernie Shore Field for $5.5 million, paying that money upfront. Starting in 2009, home games have been played at Gene Hooks Field at Wake Forest Baseball Park. The Demon Deacons' former home, Gene Hooks Stadium, was demolished following the university's purchase of Ernie Shore Field, which has since been renamed Gene Hooks Field at Wake Forest Baseball Park. In February 2016, the Wake Forest ballpark was renamed David F. Couch Ballpark in honoring former Demon Deacon baseball player David Couch.

== Individual awards ==
=== ACC Player of the Year ===
- Kenny Baker (1977)
- Brick Smith (1981)
- Bill Merrifield (1982, 1983)
- Jamie D'Antona (2003)
- Will Craig (2015)
- Bobby Seymour (2019)

=== ACC Coach of the Year ===
- Marvin Crater (1982)
- George Greer (2002)

=== ACC Rookie of the Year ===
- Jamie D'Antona (2001)
- Allan Dykstra (2006)

=== College Baseball Hall of Fame ===
In 2010, Charlie Teague became the first and only former Demon Deacon elected into the College Baseball Hall of Fame.

Year	Player	Position
2010	Charlie Teague	2B

== Championships ==
=== NCAA College World Series Championships ===
Year	Coach	Record	Result
1955	Taylor Sanford	24–6	Defeated Western Michigan, 7–6<

=== Conference Champions ===
Year	Conference	Record	Coach
1949	SoCon	27–2	Lee Gooch
1955	ACC	28–7	Taylor Sanford
2023	ACC	22–7	Tom Walter

=== Conference Tournament champions ===
Season	Conference	Venue	Head coach
1977	ACC	Doug Kingsmore Stadium, Clemson, South Carolina	Marvin Carter
1998	ACC	Durham Bulls Athletic Park, Durham, North Carolina	George Greer
1999	ACC	Durham Bulls Athletic Park, Durham, North Carolina	George Greer
2001	ACC	Knights Stadium, Fort Mill, South Carolina	George Greer

== Wake Forest in the NCAA Tournament ==
The NCAA Division I baseball tournament started in 1947. The Demon Deacons have played in 18 tournaments, advancing to the College World Series in 1949, 1955, and 2023, winning the National Championship in 1955.

Year	Record	Pct	Notes
1949	4–2	.667	College World Series Runner-up, Region B Champion
1955	9–2	.818	College World Series Champion, District 3 Champion
1962	2–2	.500	District 3
1963	3–2	.600	District 3
1977	2–2	.500	Atlantic Regional
1998	2–2	.500	South I Regional
1999	3–3	.500	Coral Gables Super Regional, hosted Winston-Salem Regional
2000	2–2	.500	Columbia Regional
2001	3–2	.600	Knoxville Regional
2002	3–2	.600	Hosted Winston-Salem Regional
2007	1–2	.333	Round Rock Regional
2016	1–2	.333	College Station Regional
2017	4–2	.667	Gainesville Super Regional, hosted Winston-Salem Regional
2022	1–2	.333	College Park Regional
2023	7–2	.778	College World Series 3rd Place, hosted Winston-Salem Regional and Super Regional
2024	0–2	.000	Greenville Regional
2025	3–2	.600	Knoxville Regional
2026	1–2	.333	Morgantown Regional
TOTALS	51–37	.580	

== Current and former major league players ==
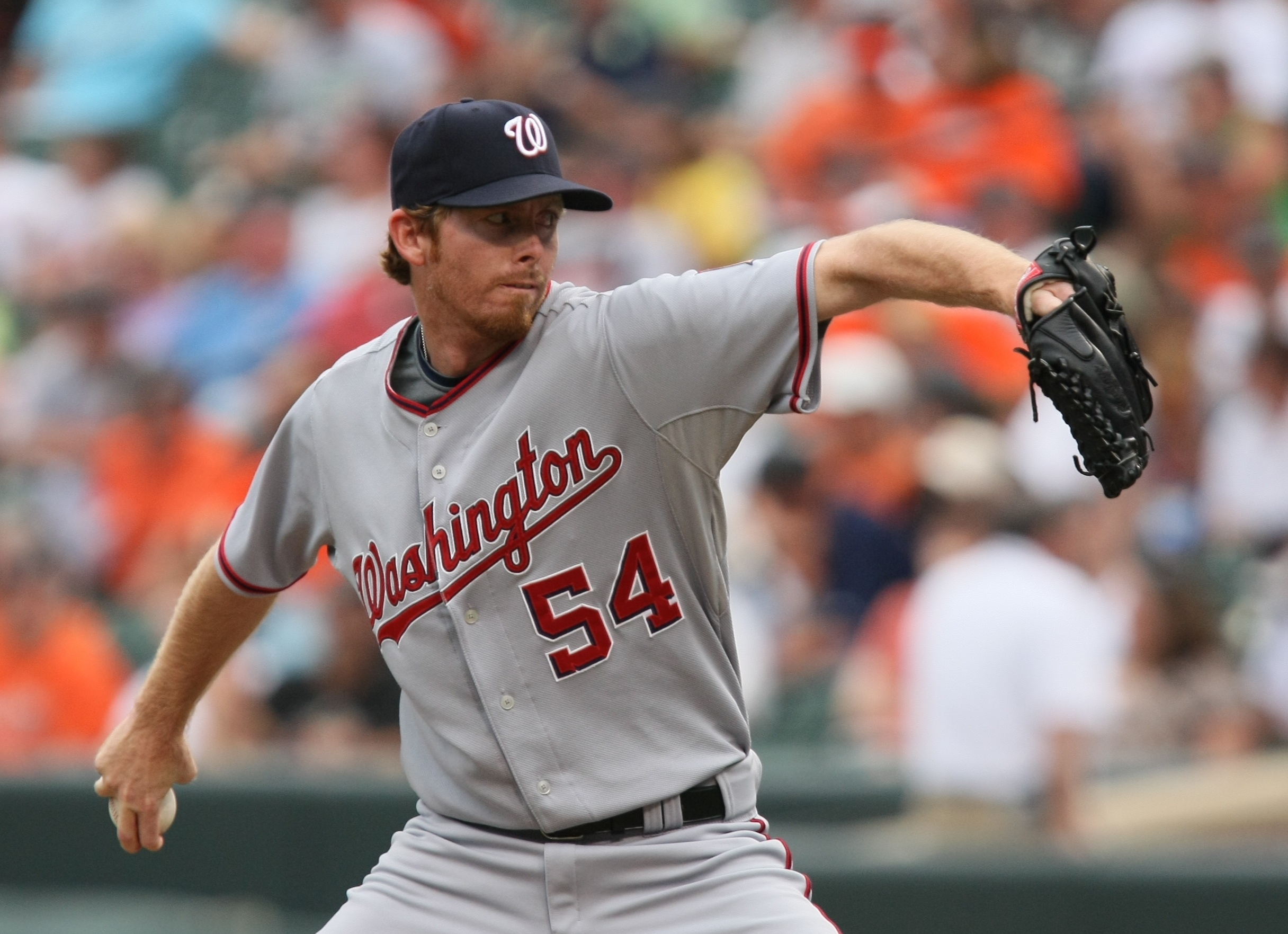
Mike MacDougal

- Morrie Aderholt
- Gair Allie
- Matt Antonelli
- Ross Atkins
- Junie Barnes
- Ryan Braun, pitcher
- Mike Buddie
- Dave Bush
- Chase Burns
- Tommy Byrne
- Rip Coleman
- Tim Cooney
- Will Craig
- Jamie D'Antona
- Sean DePaula
- Bill Dillman
- Stuart Fairchild
- John Gaddy
- Chris Getz
- Lee Gooch
- Tommy Gregg
- Erik Hanson
- Kevin Jarvis
- Nick Kurtz
- Tom Lanning
- Buddy Lewis
- Mike MacDougal
- Willard Marshall
- Jack Meyer
- Doyt Morris
- Dick Newsome
- Charlie Ripple
- Griffin Roberts
- Craig Robinson
- Ray Scarborough
- Gavin Sheets
- Elmer Sexauer
- Brick Smith
- Vic Sorrell
- Cory Sullivan
- Mac Williamson
- Larry Woodall
- Bill Wynne
- Eddie Yount

=== 2012 MLB draft ===
Six Demon Deacons were selected in the 2012 Major League Baseball draft: OF Mac Williamson by the San Francisco Giants (3rd Round), LHP Tim Cooney by the St. Louis Cardinals (3rd Round), 3B Carlos Lopez by Washington Nationals (12th Round), RHP Brian Holmes by the Houston Astros (13th round), SS Pat Blair by the Houston Astros (24th round), and RHP Michael Dimock also by the Houston Astros.

=== 2016 MLB draft ===
Only one Demon Deacon was selected in the 2016 Major League Baseball draft: 3B Will Craig by the Pittsburgh Pirates (1st round;Pick 22).

=== 2017 MLB draft ===
In 2017, Eight Wake Forest Demon Deacons were selected in the 2017 Major League Baseball draft: OF Stuart Fairchild by the Cincinnati Reds (2nd round), 1B Gavin Sheets by the Chicago White Sox (2nd round), RHP Parker Dunshee by the Oakland Athletics (7th round), C Ben Breazeale by the Baltimore Orioles (7th round), RHP Donnie Sellers by the Toronto Blue Jays (11th round), OF Jonathan Pryor by the Washington Nationals (19th round), RHP Connor Johnstone by the Atlanta Braves (21st round), and RHP Griffin Roberts by the Minnesota Twins (29th round) which set a program record and the most in the ACC.

=== World Series Champions ===
Only four former Demon Deacons have gone on to win the World Series with their respective teams.

Player	Position	Team	Number of Championships
Rip Coleman	P	New York Yankees	1
Vic Sorrell	P	Detroit Tigers	1
Ray Scarborough	P	New York Yankees	1
Tommy Byrne	P	New York Yankees	2

== See also ==
- Wake Forest Demon Deacons
- List of NCAA Division I baseball programs
