= 1955 Springfield Maroons baseball team =

American college baseball season

1955 Springfield Maroons baseball

District I Playoff champions

College World Series, T-7th
- Conference: Independent
- Record: 14–7
- Head coach: Archie Allen (8th season)

The 1955 Springfield Maroons baseball team represented Springfield College in the 1955 NCAA baseball season. The team was coached by Archie Allen in his 8th year at Springfield.

The Maroons won the District I playoff to advance to the College World Series, where they were defeated by the Arizona Wildcats.

== Roster ==
1955 Springfield Maroons baseball team
Players
Coaches
}

#	Pos.	Name	B/T	Height	Weight	Year	Home town
		Al Barber (C)	/	—	—	Sr
		Paul Bean	/	—	—	Jr
		Herb Bergquist	/	—	—	Sr
		Ed Bilik	/	—	—	So
		Travis Brown	/	—	—	Jr
		Tom Conroy	/	—	—	Jr
		Bernie Cropsey	/	—	—	Sr
		Bud Gerchell (C)	/	—	—	Sr
		Pete Hofinga	/	—	—	Sr
		Paul Jordan	/	—	—	Jr
		Joe Kobuskie	/	—	—	Jr
		Bob Macleod	/	—	—	Sr
		Dave Mertens	/	—	—	So
		Ray Murray	/	—	—	So
		Andy Pelczar	/	—	—	Jr
		Sam Rowsell	/	—	—	Jr
		Jack Sanford	/	—	—	Jr
		Dick Traynor	/	—	—	Sr
		George Ulrich	/	—	—	Sr
		Roger Wickman	/	—	—	Jr
		Wayne Wilson	/	—	—	So
		Bill York	/	—	—	Sr

Head coach

Archie Allen

Assistant coach(es)

Legend

- (C) Team captain
- (S) Suspended
- (I) Ineligible
- Injured
- Current redshirt

== Schedule ==
1955 Springfield Maroons baseball game log
Regular season
April (3–3)

#	Date	Opponent	Site/stadium	Score	Overall record
1	April 16	Connecticut	Unknown • Unknown	3–2	1–0
2	April	Providence	Unknown • Unknown	14–1	2–0
3	April	Colby	Unknown • Unknown	3–4	2–1
4	April	at Trinity	Unknown • Hartford, Connecticut	3–4	2–2
5	April	Yale	Unknown • Unknown	3–7	2–3
6	April	Amherst	Unknown • Unknown	16–12	3–3

May (9–2)

#	Date	Opponent	Site/stadium	Score	Overall record
7	May 2	UMass	Unknown • Amherst, Massachusetts	4–5	3–4
8	May	New Hampshire	Unknown • Unknown	12–4	4–4
9	May	Boston University	Unknown • Unknown	7–0	5–4
10	May	Providence	Unknown • Unknown	10–14	5–5
11	May	Holy Cross	Unknown • Worcester, Massachusetts	4–0	6–5
12	May	AIC	Unknown • Springfield, Massachusetts	4–3	7–5
13	May	Williams	Unknown • Unknown	4–3	8–5
14	May	Rhode Island	Unknown • Unknown	14–1	9–5
15	May	Brandeis	Unknown • Unknown	17–2	10–5
16	May	AIC	Unknown • Unknown	5–2	11–5
17	May	Williams	Unknown • Unknown	11–5	12–5

Postseason
District I Tournament (2–0)

#	Date	Opponent	Site/stadium	Score	Overall record
18	June 2	Boston College	Unknown • Springfield, Massachusetts	4–3	13–5
19	June 3	UMass	Unknown • Springfield, Massachusetts	17–6	14–5

College World Series (0–2)

#	Date	Opponent	Site/stadium	Score	Overall record
20	June 10	vs Oklahoma A&M	Omaha Municipal Stadium • Omaha, Nebraska	1–5	14–6
21	June 12	vs Arizona	Omaha Municipal Stadium • Omaha, Nebraska	0–6	14–7

== Awards and honors ==
Bud Gerchell

- First Team All-American
