= Oklahoma State Cowboys baseball =

NCAA Division I varsity intercollegiate baseball team

Oklahoma State Cowboys
- 2026 Oklahoma State Cowboys baseball team
- Founded: 1909 (116 years ago)
- University: Oklahoma State University
- Head coach: Josh Holliday (14th season)
- Conference: Big 12
- Location: Stillwater, Oklahoma
- Home stadium: O'Brate Stadium (capacity: 3,500)
- Nickname: Cowboys
- Colors: Orange and black

College World Series champions
- 1959

College World Series runner-up
- 1961, 1966, 1981, 1987, 1990

College World Series appearances
- 1954, 1955, 1959, 1960, 1961, 1966, 1967, 1968, 1981, 1982, 1983, 1984, 1985, 1986, 1987, 1990, 1993, 1996, 1999, 2016

NCAA regional champions
- 1981, 1982, 1983, 1984, 1985, 1986, 1987, 1990, 1993, 1996, 1999, 2007, 2014, 2016, 2019

NCAA tournament appearances
- 1948, 1949, 1954, 1955, 1959, 1960, 1961, 1966, 1967, 1968, 1969, 1978, 1981, 1982, 1983, 1984, 1985, 1986, 1987, 1988, 1989, 1990, 1991, 1992, 1993, 1994, 1995, 1996, 1997, 1998, 1999, 2001, 2004, 2006, 2007, 2008, 2009, 2011, 2013, 2014, 2015, 2016, 2017, 2018, 2019, 2021, 2022, 2023, 2024, 2025, 2026

Conference tournament champions
- Missouri Valley; 1949 Big Eight; 1978, 1981, 1982, 1983, 1984, 1985, 1986, 1987, 1988, 1989, 1990, 1991, 1992, 1993, 1994, 1995, 1996 Big 12; 2004, 2017, 2019, 2024

Conference regular season champions
- Missouri Valley; 1947, 1948, 1949, 1954, 1955 Big Eight; 1959, 1960, 1961, 1966, 1967, 1968, 1969, 1982, 1983, 1984, 1985, 1987, 1988, 1989, 1990, 1991, 1992, 1993, 1994 Big 12; 2014, 2023

Oklahoma State Cowboys baseball is the NCAA Division I varsity intercollegiate baseball team of Oklahoma State University, based in Stillwater, Oklahoma, United States. The team competes in the Big 12 Conference. The Cowboys' current head coach is Josh Holliday.

Oklahoma State is a historically elite program, with the fourth-best win percentage, 13th-most wins, eighth-most College World Series wins, sixth-most College World Series appearances, and third-most NCAA tournament appearances in college baseball history, as of February 19, 2025. The program has accumulated a better all-time win percentage and more wins, regular season conference championships, conference tournament championships, All-Americans, NCAA Tournament appearances, NCAA Tournament wins, College World Series appearances, College World Series Finals appearances, College World Series wins, and College Baseball Hall of Famers than any school in the state of Oklahoma. Oklahoma State has won 26 conference championships and 22 conference tournament championships as of the end of the 2025 season. The Cowboys have also earned 51 NCAA Tournament bids and have played in 20 College World Series, including a still-standing NCAA record seven straight CWS appearances from 1981 to 1987.

The Cowboys have four players/coaches in the College Baseball Hall of Fame: Gary Ward (who coached the program to 16 consecutive conference titles from 1981 to 1996), Tom Borland (1955 College World Series Most Outstanding Player), Pete Incaviglia (the all time home run king in college baseball history), and Robin Ventura (holder of an NCAA record 58-game hitting streak and widely regarded as the greatest hitter in college baseball history).

Oklahoma State won the national championship in 1959, led by star pitcher Joel Horlen, who would later author the 12th no-hitter in Chicago White Sox history in 1967.

== History ==
=== 1954 College World Series ===
The 1954 Oklahoma State baseball team was the first squad to make the College World Series. The team entered the postseason after winning the Missouri Valley Conference with an 8–1 conference record, before going on to defeat Texas in the District VI Playoff to punch the program's first ticket to Omaha. In the College World Series, the Cowboys were knocked off by Rollins before defeating Lafayette and Arizona for the first CWS wins in program history. Oklahoma State would be eliminated after a 7–3 loss to Missouri, who would go on to win the national championship.

=== 1955 College World Series ===
The 1955 Oklahoma State baseball team was one of the strongest in school history, going a perfect 22–0 in the regular season and claiming another Missouri Valley conference title. In the postseason, the Cowboys would punch their second ticket to Omaha with a 6–2 win over rival Oklahoma in the District V Playoff. Oklahoma State would begin their College World Series run by defeating Springfield in their opening game, before losing to Western Michigan. The Cowboys would rebound with a pair of wins over Colgate and Arizona before being eliminated by Wake Forest, who would also go on to win the national championship.

=== 1959 College World Series National Champions ===
The 1959 Oklahoma State baseball team entered the season with low expectations. Only four players, left fielder Don Soergel and pitchers Joel Horlen, Roy Peterson and Dick Soergel, were on the roster from the previous season. The preseason prospectus for 1959 read, "The baseball outlook for coach Toby Greene's 16th edition of Cowboy baseball is quite questionable. Despite the return of key members from last year's pitching staff, it's hard to consider the Pokes much of a threat with graduation, grades and the pros robbing the veteran OSU mentor of all but one of his starters." Despite the inexperience, the team compiled a 27–5 overall record with a 17–3 conference record, winning the Big Eight conference title before beating Bradley in the District V Playoff to clinch their third College World Series appearance.

Oklahoma State opened the 1959 College World Series with a 10–2 victory over Western Michigan behind a Joel Horlen five-hitter. The Cowboys had to rally for three runs in the seventh in their next contest against Penn State, but would hang on to win a close game, 8–6. Oklahoma State would lose to Arizona in the following game by a score of 5–3, as Soergel lost his first career game in twelve decisions. In the losers bracket, the Cowboys found themselves down 3–2 in the ninth in a rematch against Penn State, but scraped across two runs to earn the 4–3 victory and eliminate the Nittany Lions. A Fresno State victory over Arizona that night left three teams with one loss each. Arizona won the coin toss and became the odd man out as Oklahoma State and Fresno State met for the chance to play the Wildcats for the national championship. The Cowboys beat the Bulldogs 4–0 to advance to the championship game.

In the championship game, Jim Dobson, who was voted the Most Valuable Player, opened the Oklahoma State scoring with a towering home run over the left-field fence in the fourth inning. Arizona picked up single runs in the fourth and fifth to take a 2–1 lead. Bancroft tied the score with a solo home run in the top of the sixth, but the Wildcats added a run of their own in the bottom of the sixth to lead 3–2. It was another sophomore, Bruce Andrew, who sparked the game-winning three-run rally in the top of the seventh, giving the Cowboys a two-run lead. Soergel shut out the Wildcats in the final three innings and Oklahoma State defeated Arizona 5–3, clinching their first NCAA Baseball National Championship.

Four Cowboy players were named to the College World Series All-Tournament team, including third baseman and MVP Dobson. Also selected were Bruce Andrew at second base, Connie McIlvoy in the outfield and Horlen at pitcher.

=== 1960 College World Series ===
The 1960 Oklahoma State baseball team went 15–5 in the regular season, winning another Big Eight title and receiving an automatic bid to the College World Series for the fourth time through the District V region. In Omaha, the Cowboys opened their tournament with a loss to Arizona. In the loser's bracket, Oklahoma State pitcher Jim Wixson would toss the second no-hitter in College World Series history, and the Cowboys eliminated North Carolina in a shutout victory. Oklahoma State would go on to defeat Boston College in another shutout victory but would ultimately lose to Minnesota, who would again go on to win the national championship.

=== 1961 College World Series ===
The 1961 Oklahoma State baseball team was once again undoubtedly one of the best in the country, going 22–1 in the regular season and cruising to another Big Eight title before sweeping Northern Iowa in the District V Playoff to clinch the program's fifth College World Series trip. In Omaha, the Cowboys would open the tournament with close wins over Duke and Syracuse before falling to USC. Needing a win against Syracuse to earn a rematch against USC in the national championship, Oklahoma State shut out the Orangemen and were into the national championship game. The Trojans would win again in the rematch however, holding the Cowboys to just four hits and no runs and handing Oklahoma State their first national runner–up finish.

=== 1966 College World Series ===
The 1966 Oklahoma State baseball team wasn't quite as dominant as in years past, but still managed a 16–9 regular season record and Big Eight title. In the District V Playoff, the Cowboys would beat Saint Louis twice in close games to punch their ticket to Omaha for the sixth time. In the College World Series, Oklahoma State would drop their opening game to Ohio State to fall into the losers bracket. Needing three straight wins to make it back to the national championship game, the Cowboys would use dominant pitching to eliminate North Carolina, Texas and St. John's. Despite losing in the first game of the tournament, Oklahoma State had managed to stave off elimination three times and earned themselves a rematch against Ohio State for the national title. The Buckeyes would dominate in the title game however, blowing out the Cowboys 8–2 and handing Oklahoma State their second-straight national runner–up finish.

=== 1967 College World Series ===
The 1967 Oklahoma State baseball team went just 13–7 in the regular season, but performed well in conference play, going 12–3 and winning the Big Eight title. In the District V Playoff, the Cowboys would win a very competitive series against Cincinnati, and were on their way to the College World Series for the seventh time. However, it would be a short appearance in Omaha for the Cowboys, falling to eventual national champion Arizona State in the opening game before then being eliminated by Rider in a close loss.

=== 1968 College World Series ===
The 1968 Oklahoma State baseball team improved to an 18–7 regular season record and cruised to another dominant performance in conference play and Big Eight title. The Cowboys were once again matched up with Bradley in the District V Playoff, and just as they did in 1959, Oklahoma State swept them to earn their eighth College World Series appearance. In Omaha, the Cowboys would open their tournament run with a win over Texas. In the winner's bracket, Oklahoma State would lose in a close game to eventual national champion USC and were then eliminated by Southern Illinois in a blowout loss.

=== 1981 College World Series ===
The 1981 Oklahoma State baseball team was the first of seven straight Cowboy teams to make the College World Series, a record still held today. The team posted an impressive 43–14 regular season record and won the Big Eight tournament title over Nebraska. In the Midwest Regional, Oklahoma State defeated Southern Illinois once and Oral Roberts twice to clinch the program's ninth College World Series appearance. In the College World Series, the Cowboys opened with a ten-inning victory over South Carolina, followed by a dominant win over Miami and a 13-inning victory over Arizona State to reach the national semifinals. Despite a loss to Texas in 15 innings, the Cowboys won a coin toss and clinched their spot in the national championship game. In the title game, it was Arizona State getting revenge on the Cowboys, defeating Oklahoma State 7–4 and handing the Cowboys their third national runner–up finish.

=== 1982 College World Series ===
The 1982 Oklahoma State baseball team won 50 games in the regular season, going 50–14 en route to winning both the Big Eight regular season and tournament titles. In the Midwest Regional, the Cowboys would again sweep the competition, defeating Minnesota once and Middle Tennessee twice to earn the program's 10th Omaha appearance. In the College World Series, Oklahoma State would suffer a blowout loss to Texas to open the tournament before rebounding with a win over South Carolina to stave off elimination. The Cowboys would then lose again in blowout fashion to Wichita State, ending their season.

=== 1983 College World Series ===
The 1983 Oklahoma State baseball team produced another successful regular season, going 40–13 and winning both the Big Eight regular season and tournament titles over rival Oklahoma. In the Midwest Regional, the Cowboys were given matchups against Wichita State and Oral Roberts, both teams that Oklahoma State had faced in the regular season. The Cowboys took care of business, beating the Shockers once and the Golden Eagles twice to earn the program's 11th College World Series appearance. In the College World Series, Oklahoma State opened by winning a close game against Stanford to enter the winners bracket. The Cowboys would lose a one-run game against eventual national champion Texas before dropping another one-run contest at the hands of Arizona State, eliminating the Cowboys.

=== 1984 College World Series ===
The 1984 Oklahoma State baseball team won more games than any other team in program history, going 61–15 in total. The Cowboys once again swept the Big Eight regular season and tournament titles, heading into the Midwest Regional with a 54–12 record. Despite easily defeating Grambling State in the opening game, the Cowboys were upset by Oklahoma City to push them to the edge of elimination. Oklahoma State would respond by shutting out Texas A&M and beating Oklahoma City twice in a row to book the program's 12th trip to Omaha. In the College World Series, the Cowboys picked up an opening round win against Maine before being defeated by Arizona State. Once again facing elimination, Oklahoma State won a close game against New Orleans before beating Texas in a high scoring contest. After the Longhorns won a coin flip to clinch a spot in the finals, the Cowboys were slotted against Cal State Fullerton with a trip to the title game on the line. The Titans would go on to blow out Oklahoma State, ending the Cowboys season en route to winning the national championship.

=== 1985 College World Series ===
The 1985 Oklahoma State baseball team again won over 50 regular season games, going 51–13–1 and yet again claiming both the Big Eight regular season and tournament titles over runner–up Oklahoma. In the Midwest Regional, the Cowboys took care of Minnesota easily before knocking off Wichita State twice to clinch the program's 13th trip to the College World Series. In Omaha, Oklahoma State suffered a blowout loss in the opening game to Mississippi State, sending the Cowboys to the edge of elimination. Oklahoma State survived the first elimination game, holding off South Carolina in a high scoring game before falling to eventual national champion Miami in a one-run contest and being eliminated.

=== 1986 College World Series ===
The 1986 Oklahoma State baseball team went 46–12 in the regular season, most notably going an absurd 29–0 in the month of April en route to winning the Big Eight tournament title again over Oklahoma. In the Midwest Regional, the Cowboys cruised to two easy wins over Richmond and Appalachian State before knocking off Stanford twice to lock up the program's 14th trip to Omaha. In the College World Series, Miami would once again beat Oklahoma State, sending them to the losers bracket where they would stave off elimination twice. In the first game, the Cowboys pitched a shutout to eliminate Indiana State, before notching a comfortable win over Loyola Marymount in the second contest. With a trip to the national semifinals on the line, Oklahoma State lost in a one-run game to Florida State, ending their season.

=== 1987 College World Series ===
The 1987 Oklahoma State baseball team finished the regular season at 47–9, including a red-hot start of 43–4. After yet again winning both the Big Eight regular season and tournament titles, the Cowboys entered the Mideast Regional at 51–10. In the Mideast Regional, the Cowboys opened with wins over Western Carolina and NC State before falling to Texas A&M. Needing three wins to keep their season alive, Oklahoma State again beat Western Carolina before knocking off the Aggies twice in close games to send the Cowboys to the College World Series for the 15th time. In Omaha, Oklahoma State picked up where they left off, winning three straight games over Arizona State, LSU and Stanford to clinch a spot in the national semifinals. Despite a loss to Texas, Oklahoma State received a spot in the national championship game against Stanford. The Cowboys would be unable to beat the Cardinal again in the rematch, falling to Stanford 9–5 and receiving the program's fourth national runner–up finish.

=== 1990 College World Series ===
The 1990 Oklahoma State baseball team dominated the rest of the conference, going 46–16 overall and 18–6 in the Big Eight en route to winning the Big Eight regular season title by five games before cruising to another tournament title. In the West II Regional, the Cowboys easily beat UC Santa Barbara and Washington State before knocking off Arizona State twice in Tempe to clinch the program's 16th College World Series appearance. In the College World Series, Oklahoma State continued their perfect postseason, demolishing Cal State Fullerton in the first game and outscoring LSU by 17 runs in the second and third games to once again clinch a spot in the national championship game. Despite the dominant postseason run up to that point, the Cowboys were unable to get over the last hurdle, falling to Georgia in a one-run game and receiving the program's fifth national runner–up finish.

=== 1993 College World Series ===
The 1993 Oklahoma State baseball team went 34–13 in the regular season, winning the Big Eight regular season and tournament titles by the slimmest of margins over Kansas. In the Midwest Regional, the Cowboys began their postseason run by defeating UConn, Auburn and NC State before falling to Arizona. With a trip to Omaha on the line, Oklahoma State won by a single run in the rematch against the Wildcats, sending the Cowboys to the College World Series for the 17th time. In the College World Series, Oklahoma State suffered a one-run loss to Texas in the opening game before rebounding and winning a one-run contest against Arizona State to stay alive. The Cowboys would then get their revenge on the Longhorns, eliminating them in the rematch and clinching a spot in the national semifinals. Needing two wins against Wichita State to stay alive, the Cowboys failed to get even one, falling to the Shockers and being eliminated.

=== 1996 College World Series ===
The 1996 Oklahoma State baseball team finished 37–19 in the regular season with a 17–9 conference record en route to winning the program's 16th–straight Big Eight tournament title. In the Central II Regional, the Cowboys edged out Arkansas by a run before easily taking down Fresno State. Oklahoma State would then dominate USC in back-to-back games to clinch a spot in the College World Series for the 18th time in program history. The trip to Omaha was short however, as losses to Alabama and Clemson eliminated the Cowboys from the College World Series without a win for just the second time in program history.

=== 1999 College World Series ===
The 1999 Oklahoma State baseball team went a respectable 41–14 in the regular season with a 19–9 record in the Big 12. In the Wichita Regional, the Cowboys earned the second seed but were quickly upset by third-seeded UCLA. One loss away from elimination, Oklahoma State notched a win over Oral Roberts before getting revenge on UCLA and eliminating the Bruins in the rematch. Needing two wins against Wichita State, the Cowboys delivered, beating the Shockers twice on their home field to send Oklahoma State to the Waco Super Regional. Facing Big 12 rival Baylor in Waco, the Cowboys won the opening game easily before falling in the second, setting up a third game. Oklahoma State would go on to defeat Baylor in the deciding contest, sending the Cowboys to Omaha for the 19th time. In the College World Series, it was once again an early exit for Oklahoma State. Losses to Alabama and Rice quickly eliminated the Cowboys, who left Omaha without a win for just the third time in program history.

=== 2016 College World Series ===
The 2016 Oklahoma State baseball team turned in a solid regular season, going 35–18 with a 16–8 conference record and receiving a 2 seed in the Clemson Regional. First meeting up with Nebraska, the Cowboys pitched a shutout in a dominant win over the Cornhuskers, sending them to a showdown with Clemson. The Cowboys would go on to manhandle the Tigers, beating them by a combined 17 runs over two games to send Oklahoma State to the Columbia Super Regional. Picking up where they left off, Oklahoma State would sweep South Carolina in two games to clinch the 20th College World Series appearance in program history. In Omaha, the Cowboys would win a pair of 1–0 contests against UC Santa Barbara and Arizona to claim a spot in the national semifinals. Needing just one more win against Arizona to earn a berth in the national championship series, the Cowboys were unable to get it, falling to the Wildcats twice and being eliminated in heartbreaking fashion.

=== Head coaches ===
Tenure	Coach	Year(s)	Record	Pct.
1909–1915	Paul J. Davis	7	54–40–1	.573
1916	Art Griffith	1	5–9	.357
1917–1918	Earl A. Pritchard	2	3–13	.188
1919	Randle Perdue	1	3–11	.214
1920–1921	Hoot Sackett	2	14–19	.424
1922–1929	John Maulbetsch	8	61–59	.508
1930	George E. Rody	1	9–3	.750
1932–1933	Albert Exendine	2	19–13	.594
1934–1941	Henry Iba	8	90–41	.687
1942–1943, 1946–1964	Toby Greene	21	318–132	.707
1965–1977	Chet Bryan	13	247–198–2	.555
1978–1996	Gary Ward	19	953–313–1	.752
1997–2003	Tom Holliday	7	281–150	.652
2004–2012	Frank Anderson	9	329–208	.613
2013–present	Josh Holliday	12	445–236–2	.652
Totals	15 coaches	113	2,831–1,445–5	.662

=== Conference affiliations ===
- Independent (1901–1914, 1956–1960)
- Southwest Conference (1914–1924)
- MVIAA (1924–1927)
- Missouri Valley Conference (1927–1956)
- Big Eight Conference (1960–1996)
- Big 12 Conference (1996–present)

== Facilities ==
The Cowboys planned to open the new O'Brate Stadium, located one block northwest of the team's current home of Allie P. Reynolds Stadium, on March 20, 2020 for the Cowboys' Big 12 opener against TCU. The Cowboys played their first 11 of a planned 14 home games of the 2020 season at Reynolds Stadium. Named for major donor Cecil O'Brate, the new ballpark has a permanent capacity of 3,500 but is expandable to 8,000.

Reynolds Stadium is named after the former Oklahoma State player Allie Reynolds, who went on to play professionally for the Cleveland Indians and New York Yankees. The park, with a capacity of 3,821, opened in 1981 at a cost of $2.2 million.

== Year-by-year results ==
Year	Head coach	Overall	Winning %	Conference	Winning %	Conference Rank	National Rank	Notes/Postseason
1909	P.J. Davis	5–5	.500	–	–	–	–	–
1910	P.J. Davis	7–5	.583	–	–	–	–	–
1911	P.J. Davis	8–2	.800	–	–	–	–	–
1912	P.J. Davis	10–5–1	.656	–	–	–	–	–
1913	P.J. Davis	9–4	.692	–	–	–	–	–
1914	P.J. Davis	10–7	.588	–	–	–	–	–
1915	P.J. Davis	5–12	.294	–	–	–	–	–
1916	Art Griffith	5–9	.357	–	–	–	–	–
1917	E.A Pritchard	2–6	.250	–	–	–	–	–
1918	E.A Pritchard	1–7	.125	–	–	–	–	–
1919	Randle Perdue	3–11	.214	–	–	–	–	–
1920	Hoot Sackett	9–7	.653	–	–	–	–	–
1921	Hoot Sackett	5–12	.294	–	–	–	–	–
1922	John Maulbetsch	8–7	.533	–	–	–	–	–
1923	John Maulbetsch	8–6	.571	–	–	–	–	–
1924	John Maulbetsch	10–8	.556	–	–	–	–	–
1925	John Maulbetsch	6–8	.429	–	–	–	–	–
1926	John Maulbetsch	6–9	.400	–	–	–	–	–
1927	John Maulbetsch	6–10	.375	–	–	–	–	–
1928	John Maulbetsch	12–4	.750	–	–	–	–	–
1929	John Maulbetsch	5–7	.417	–	–	–	–	–
1930	George E. Rody	9–3	.750	–	–	–	–	–
1931	–	–	–	–	–	–	–	No Team
1932	Albert Exendine	6–10	.375	–	–	–	–	–
1933	Albert Exendine	13–3	.813	–	–	–	–	–
1934	Henry Iba	11–4	.733	–	–	–	–	–
1935	Henry Iba	8–8	.500	–	–	–	–	–
1936	Henry Iba	13–7	.650	–	–	–	–	–
1937	Henry Iba	13–4	.765	–	–	–	–	–
1938	Henry Iba	13–4	.765	–	–	–	–	–
1939	Henry Iba	11–7	.611	–	–	–	–	–
1940	Henry Iba	13–5	.722	–	–	–	–	–
1941	Henry Iba	8–2	.800	–	–	–	–	–
1942	Toby Greene	6–5	.545	–	–	–	–	–
1943	Toby Greene	4–3	.571	–	–	–	–	–
1944	–	–	–	–	–	–	–	No Team (WWII)
1945	–	–	–	–	–	–	–	No Team (WWII)
1946	Toby Greene	15–2	.882	–	–	–	–	–
1947	Toby Greene	11–5	.688	11–5	.688	1st	–	–
1948	Toby Greene	20–6	.769	20–6	.769	1st	–	District V Champions; Western Playoff
1949	Toby Greene	22–6	.846	5–0	1.000	1st	–	MVC Tournament Champions; District V Champions; Region C Playoff
1950	Toby Greene	15–7	.682	6–3	.667	2nd	–	–
1951	Toby Greene	9–8	.529	2–4	.333	5th	–	–
1952	Toby Greene	15–5	.750	5–2	.714	2nd	–	–
1953	Toby Greene	13–4	.765	4–2	.667	T-2nd	–	–
1954	Toby Greene	18–11	.621	8–1	.889	1st	–	District 6 Champions; College World Series
1955	Toby Greene	27–3	.900	8–0	1.000	1st	–	District 5 Champions; College World Series
1956	Toby Greene	11–10	.524	7–2	.778	2nd	–	–
1957	Toby Greene	12–3	.800	7–2	.778	2nd	–	–
1958	Toby Greene	17–6	.739	13–5	.722	2nd	–	–
1959	Toby Greene	27–5	.844	17–3	.850	1st	1	District 5 Champions; College World Series; National Champions
1960	Toby Greene	17–7	.708	12–4	.750	1st	2	District 5 Champions; College World Series
1961	Toby Greene	27–3	.900	18–1	.947	1st	2	District 5 Champions; College World Series Runners-Up
1962	Toby Greene	11–9	.550	10–6	.625	2nd	–	–
1963	Toby Greene	15–10	.600	12–9	.571	5th	–	–
1964	Toby Greene	6–14	.300	4–12	.538	7th	–	–
1965	Chet Bryan	14–11	.560	12–9	.571	3rd	–	–
1966	Chet Bryan	21–11	.656	13–7	.650	1st	10	District 5 Champions; College World Series Runners-Up
1967	Chet Bryan	15–10	.600	12–3	.800	1st	12	District 5 Champions; College World Series
1968	Chet Bryan	21–9	.700	15–3	.833	1st	3	District 5 Champions; College World Series
1969	Chet Bryan	20–9	.690	17–3	.850	1st	12	–
1970	Chet Bryan	11–17	.393	5–11	.313	8th	–	–
1971	Chet Bryan	14–19	.424	8–13	.381	6th	–	–
1972	Chet Bryan	15–17–1	.470	10–10	.500	4th	–	–
1973	Chet Bryan	30–6	.833	15–5	.750	2nd	13	–
1974	Chet Bryan	24–17	.585	9–12	.429	5th	–	–
1975	Chet Bryan	22–18	.550	10–10	.500	4th	–	–
1976	Chet Bryan	24–26–1	.480	1–2	.333	T-5th	–	–
1977	Chet Bryan	16–28	.364	3–7	.300	6th	–	–
1978	Gary Ward	40–22	.645	7–5	.583	1st	20	Big Eight Tournament Champions; Midwest Regional
1979	Gary Ward	33–19	.635	12–8	.600	T-3rd	–	–
1980	Gary Ward	43–10	.811	17–3	.850	1st	16	–
1981	Gary Ward	52–17	.754	12–6	.667	1st	3	Big Eight Tournament Champions; Midwest Regional Champions; College World Series Runners-Up
1982	Gary Ward	57–16	.781	19–5	.792	1st	4	Big Eight Tournament Champions; Midwest Regional Champions; College World Series
1983	Gary Ward	48–16	.750	11–3	.786	1st	3	Big Eight Tournament Champions; Midwest Regional Champions; College World Series
1984	Gary Ward	61–15	.803	15–3	.833	1st	3	Big Eight Tournament Champions; Midwest Regional Champions; College World Series
1985	Gary Ward	58–16–1	.780	19–4	.826	1st	5	Big Eight Tournament Champions; Midwest Regional Champions; College World Series
1986	Gary Ward	56–15	.789	18–5	.783	1st	4	Big Eight Tournament Champions; Midwest Regional Champions; College World Series
1987	Gary Ward	59–13	.819	15–6	.714	1st	4	Big Eight Tournament Champions; Mideast Regional Champions; College World Series Runners-Up
1988	Gary Ward	61–8	.884	21–3	.875	1st	9	Big Eight Tournament Champions; Midwest Regional
1989	Gary Ward	48–19	.716	18–6	.750	1st	15	Big Eight Tournament Champions; Midwest Regional
1990	Gary Ward	56–17	.767	18–6	.750	1st	2	Big Eight Tournament Champions; West II Regional Champions; College World Series Runners-Up
1991	Gary Ward	47–20	.701	17–7	.708	1st	9	Big Eight Tournament Champions; Central Regional
1992	Gary Ward	49–16	.754	17–7	.708	1st	13	Big Eight Tournament Champions; Midwest Regional
1993	Gary Ward	45–17	.726	16–8	.667	1st	4	Big Eight Tournament Champions; Midwest Regional Champions; College World Series
1994	Gary Ward	49–17	.742	21–6	.778	1st	12	Big Eight Tournament Champions; Midwest I Regional
1995	Gary Ward	46–19	.708	18–10	.643	1st	11	Big Eight Tournament Champions; Mideast Regional
1996	Gary Ward	45–21	.682	17–9	.654	2nd	8	Big Eight Tournament Champions; Central II Regional Champions; College World Series
1997	Tom Holliday	46–19	.708	22–9	.710	3rd	12	–
1998	Tom Holliday	40–21	.656	14–12	.538	6th	–	Midwest Regional
1999	Tom Holliday	46–21	.687	18–9	.667	4th	8	Wichita Regional Champions; Waco Super Regional Champions; College World Series
2000	Tom Holliday	36–22	.621	14–13	.519	6th	–	–
2001	Tom Holliday	42–22	.656	16–14	.533	5th	–	New Orleans Regional
2002	Tom Holliday	37–21	.638	13–13	.500	T-5th	–	–
2003	Tom Holliday	34–24	.586	14–13	.519	6th	–	–
2004	Frank Anderson	38–24	.613	15–11	.577	4th	–	Big 12 Tournament Champions; Tallahassee Regional
2005	Frank Anderson	34–25	.576	12–15	.444	6th	–	–
2006	Frank Anderson	41–20	.672	18–9	.667	2nd	23	Fayetteville Regional
2007	Frank Anderson	42–21	.667	16–11	.593	3rd	21	Fayetteville Regional Champions; Louisville Super Regional
2008	Frank Anderson	44–18	.710	18–9	.667	2nd	18	Stillwater Regional
2009	Frank Anderson	34–24	.586	9–16	.360	9th	–	Clemson Regional
2010	Frank Anderson	29–26	.527	8–19	.296	10th	–	–
2011	Frank Anderson	35–25	.583	14–12	.538	4th	–	Nashville Regional
2012	Frank Anderson	32–25	.561	13–11	.542	5th	–	–
2013	Josh Holliday	41–19	.683	13–10	.565	2nd	21	Louisville Regional
2014	Josh Holliday	48–18	.727	18–6	.750	1st	10	Big 12 Regular Season Champions; Stillwater Regional Champions; Stillwater Super Regional
2015	Josh Holliday	38–20	.655	14–8	.636	2nd	18	Stillwater Regional
2016	Josh Holliday	43–22	.662	16–8	.667	2nd	4	Clemson Regional Champions; Columbia Super Regional Champions; College World Series
2017	Josh Holliday	30–27	.526	8–13	.381	8th	–	Big 12 Tournament Champions; Fayetteville Regional
2018	Josh Holliday	31–26–1	.543	16–8	.667	2nd	–	DeLand Regional
2019	Josh Holliday	40–21	.656	14–9	.609	3rd	11	Big 12 Tournament Champions; Oklahoma City Regional Champions; Lubbock Super Regional
2020	Josh Holliday	13–5	.722	0-0	–	–	–	Remainder of season canceled due to COVID-19 pandemic
2021	Josh Holliday	36–19–1	.643	12–12	.500	4th	24	Tucson Regional
2022	Josh Holliday	42–22	.656	15–9	.625	T-2nd	17	Stillwater Regional
2023	Josh Holliday	41–20	.672	15–9	.625	T-1st	23	Big 12 Regular Season Champions Stillwater Regional
2024	Josh Holliday	42–19	.689	19–9	.679	2nd	14	Big 12 Tournament Champions Stillwater Regional
2025	Josh Holliday	30–25	.545	15–12	.556	7th	–	Athens Regional
2026	Josh Holliday	39–22	.639	18–12	.600	5th	25	Tuscaloosa Regional

== Rivalries ==
=== Oklahoma Sooners ===
Oklahoma State's series against Bedlam rival Oklahoma has featured more games played than any other baseball series in program history. Through the 2026 season, the Cowboys lead the overall series against the Sooners 190–162, with Oklahoma State dominating the rivalry in recent years, boasting a 38–16 record against Oklahoma since 2013, head coach Josh Holliday's first season. In the final Big 12 conference baseball game between the two schools, Oklahoma State defeated Oklahoma 9–3 to win the 2024 Big 12 tournament.

=== Wichita State Shockers ===
The Oklahoma State and Wichita State baseball rivalry spans back to the 1940's, during their time together in the Missouri Valley Conference. Through the 2026 season, the Cowboys lead the overall series against the Shockers 70–36. The teams have met numerous times in the postseason, with Oklahoma State defeating Wichita State in 1983, 1985 and 1999 en route to College World Series appearances and the Shockers eliminating the Cowboys from Omaha in 1982 and 1993. Oklahoma State and Wichita State have combined for ten College World Series Finals appearances, but have only captured two national championships, with the Cowboys winning it all in 1959 and the Shockers doing the same in 1989.

== Former Cowboy Major Leaguers ==
Athlete	Years in MLB	MLB teams
Jerry Adair	1958–70	Baltimore Orioles, Chicago White Sox, Boston Red Sox, Kansas City Royals
Jon Adkins	2003–08	Chicago White Sox, San Diego Padres, New York Mets, Cincinnati Reds
Scott Baker	2005–11, 2013–15	Minnesota Twins, Chicago Cubs, Texas Rangers, Los Angeles Dodgers
Peyton Battenfield	2023	Cleveland Guardians
Carson Benge	2026 - pres.	New York Mets
Jim Beauchamp	1963–65, 1967–73	St Louis Cardinals, Houston Colt .45s/Astros, Milwaukee/Atlanta Braves, Cincinnati Reds, New York Mets
Josh Billings	1913–23	Cleveland Indians, St. Louis Browns
Joe Bisenius	2007, 2010	Philadelphia Phillies, Washington Nationals
Tom Borland	1960–61	Boston Red Sox
Jeff Bronkey	1993–95	Texas Rangers, Milwaukee Brewers
Corey Brown	2011–14	Washington Nationals, Boston Red Sox
Cal Browning	1960	St. Louis Cardinals
Ryan Budde	2007–10	Los Angeles Angels
Larry Burchart	1969	Cleveland Indians
Jeromy Burnitz	1993–96, 1998–2006	New York Mets, Cleveland Indians, Milwaukee Brewers, Los Angeles Dodgers, Colorado Rockies, Chicago Cubs, Pittsburgh Pirates
Jay Canizaro	1996, 1999–2002	San Francisco Giants, Minnesota Twins
Doug Dascenzo	1988–93, 1996	Chicago Cubs, Texas Rangers, San Diego Padres
Carlos Diaz	1990	Toronto Blue Jays
Gordie Dillard	1988–89	Baltimore Orioles, Philadelphia Phillies
Danny Doyle	1943	Boston Red Sox
Christian Encarnacion-Strand	2023 - pres.	Cincinnati Reds
Monty Fariss	1991–93	Texas Rangers, Florida Marlins
John Farrell	1987–90, 1993–96	Cleveland Indians, California Angels, Detroit Tigers
Josh Fields	2006–10	Chicago White Sox, Kansas City Royals
Koda Glover	2016–18	Washington Nationals
Gary Green	1986–92	San Diego Padres, Texas Rangers, Cincinnati Reds
Matt Hague	2012, 2014–15	Pittsburgh Pirates, Toronto Blue Jays
Thomas Hatch	2020 - pres.	Toronto Blue Jays, Pittsburgh Pirates, Kansas City Royals, Minnesota Twins
Andrew Heaney	2014–2025	Miami Marlins, Los Angeles Angels, New York Yankees, Los Angeles Dodgers, Texas Rangers, Pittsburgh Pirates
Jonathan Heasley	2021 - pres.	Kansas City Royals, Baltimore Orioles
Mike Henneman	1987–96	Detroit Tigers, Houston Astros, Texas Rangers
Joel Horlen	1961–72	Chicago White Sox, Oakland Athletics
Rex Hudson	1974	Los Angeles Dodgers
Jason Hursh	2016–17	Atlanta Braves
Pete Incaviglia	1986–91, 1993–98	Texas Rangers, Detroit Tigers, Houston Astros, Philadelphia Phillies, Baltimore Orioles, New York Yankees
Jason Jaramillo	2009–11	Pittsburgh Pirates
Frank Kellert	1953–56	St. Louis Cardinals, Baltimore Orioles, Brooklyn Dodgers, Chicago Cubs
Frank Linzy	1963, 1965–74	San Francisco Giants, St. Louis Cardinals, Milwaukee Brewers, Philadelphia Phillies
Mark Lukasiewicz	2001–02	Los Angeles Angels
Tyler Lyons	2016–2020	St. Louis Cardinals, Pittsburgh Pirates, New York Yankees
Matt Mangini	2010	Seattle Mariners
Hersh Martin	1937–40, 1944–45	Philadelphia Phillies, New York Yankees
Trevor Martin	2026 - pres.	Tampa Bay Rays
Dave Maurer	2000–02	San Diego Padres, Cleveland Indians
Carson McCusker	2025	Minnesota Twins
Nolan McLean	2025 - pres.	New York Mets
Victor Mederos	2023 - pres.	Los Angeles Angels
Jordy Mercer	2012–2021	Pittsburgh Pirates, Detroit Tigers, New York Yankees, Washington Nationals
Ed Mickelson	1950, 1953, 1957	St. Louis Cardinals, St. Louis Browns, Chicago Cubs
Dave Mlicki	1992–93, 1995–2002	Cleveland Indians, New York Mets, Los Angeles Dodgers, Detroit Tigers, Houston Astros
Merlin Nippert	1962	Boston Red Sox
Andrew Oliver	2010–11	Detroit Tigers
Darrell Osteen	1965–67, 1970	Cincinnati Reds, Oakland Athletics
Danny Perez	1996	Milwaukee Brewers
Joe Price	1980–90	Cincinnati Reds, San Francisco Giants, Boston Red Sox, Baltimore Orioles
Tim Pugh	1992–97	Cincinnati Reds, Kansas City Royals, Detroit Tigers
Allie P. Reynolds	1942–52	Cleveland Indians, New York Yankees
Chris Richard	2000–03, 2009	St. Louis Cardinals, Baltimore Orioles, Colorado Rockies, Tampa Bay Rays
Scott Richmond	2008–09, 2011–12	Toronto Blue Jays
Rusty Ryal	2009–10	Arizona Diamondbacks
Jeff Salazar	2006–09	Colorado Rockies, Arizona Diamondbacks, Pittsburgh Pirates
Luke Scott	2005–13	Houston Astros, Baltimore Orioles, Tampa Bay Rays
Matt Smith	2006–07	New York Yankees, Philadelphia Phillies
Joe Stanka	1959	Chicago White Sox
Mickey Tettleton	1984–97	Oakland Athletics, Baltimore Orioles, Detroit Tigers, Texas Rangers
Danny Thompson	1970–76	Minnesota Twins, Texas Rangers
Mike Thompson	1971, 1973–75	Washington Senators, St. Louis Cardinals, Atlanta Braves
Jim Traber	1984, 1986, 1988–89	Baltimore Orioles
Robin Ventura	1989–2004	Chicago White Sox, New York Mets, New York Yankees, Los Angeles Dodgers
Don Wallace	1967	California Angels
Donnie Walton	2019-2022, 2024-pres.	Seattle Mariners, San Francisco Giants, Philadelphia Phillies
Scott Watkins	1995	Minnesota Twins
Robbie Weinhardt	2010–11	Detroit Tigers
Dib Williams	1930–35	Philadelphia Athletics, Boston Red Sox
Scott Williamson	1999–2007	Cincinnati Reds, Boston Red Sox, Chicago Cubs, San Diego Padres, Baltimore Orioles
Robbie Wine	1986–87	Houston Astros
Ab Wright	1935, 1944	Cleveland Indians, Boston Braves
Justin Wrobleski	2024 - pres.	Los Angeles Dodgers

== Player awards ==
The following Cowboys were given the following awards, as voted on by the American Baseball Coaches Association, Baseball America, Collegiate Baseball, the National Collegiate Baseball Writers Association, and Sporting News:

=== National awards ===
- Dick Howser Trophy

Robin Ventura, 1988

- Golden Spikes Award

Robin Ventura, 1988

- Sporting News College Baseball Player of the Year

Robbie Wine, 1982
Robin Ventura, 1987, 1988

- College World Series Most Outstanding Player

Tom Borland, 1955
Jim Dobson, 1959
Littleton Fowler, 1961

=== First-Team All-Americans ===
- 1951

Joe Buck (C), (ABCA)

- 1955

Ron Bennett (OF) (ABCA)
Tom Borland (P) (ABCA)

- 1960

Dick Soergel (P) (ABCA)

- 1961

Jim Wixson (P) (ABCA)

- 1967

Tony Sellari (C) (ABCA)

- 1968

Danny Thompson (SS) (ABCA)

- 1982

Robbie Wine (C) (ABCA)

- 1983

Dennis Livingston (P) (BA)

- 1984

Pete Incaviglia (DH) (ABCA, BA)

- 1985

Pete Incaviglia (OF) (ABCA, BA)

- 1986

Robin Ventura (3B) (BA)

- 1987

Robin Ventura (3B) (ABCA, BA)
Jim Ifland (DH) (ABCA)

- 1988

Robin Ventura (3B) (BA)
Monty Fariss (SS) (BA)

- 1991

Michael Daniel (DH) (BA, CB)

- 1993

Ernesto Rivera (3B) (NCBWA)

- 1994

Jason Bell (P) (BA, NCBWA)

- 1995

Tal Light (3B) (NCBWA)
Peter Prodanov (SS) (NCBWA)

- 1996

Jeff Guiel (OF) (ABCA, CB)

- 1997

Jeff Guiel (OF) (ABCA, CB)

- 2012

Andrew Heaney (P) (ABCA, BA, NCBWA)

- 2014

Brendan McCurry (P) (NCBWA)

- 2015

Michael Freeman (P) (ABCA, BA, NCBWA)

- 2016

Thomas Hatch (D1 Baseball)

- 2017

Garrett McCain (OF) (ABCA)

=== All College World Series ===
- 1955

Tom Borland (P)

- 1959

Bruce Andrew (2B)
Jim Dobson (3B)
Connie McIlvoy (OF)
Joel Horlen (P)

- 1961

Bruce Andrew (2B)
Don Wallace (3B)
Littleton Fowler (P)

- 1966

Bob Toney (3B)
Wayne Weatherly (OF)

- 1968

Danny Thompson (SS)
Wayne Weatherly (OF)

- 1981

Ray Echtebarren (2B)
Mickey Tettleton (OF)

- 1983

Tim Knapp (OF)
Pete Incaviglia (OF)

- 1984

Randy Whisler (2B)
Gary Green (SS)
Pete Incaviglia (DH)

- 1986

Robin Ventura (3B)

- 1987

Adam Smith (C)
Jimmy Barragan (1B)
Brad Beanblossom (2B)
Pat Hope (P)

- 1990

Michael Daniel (C)
Brad Beanblossom (SS)
Bobby Carlsen (3B)

- 1993

Hunter Triplett (1B)
Jason Heath (OF)

== Hall of Fame ==
The Oklahoma State Cowboy baseball program has produced four National College Baseball Hall of Famers, who were inducted in the first three years of its existence. Oklahoma State baseball has its own Hall of Fame, in which players and coaches have been inducted.

=== National College Baseball Hall of Famers ===
- Robin Ventura, 2006
- Pete Incaviglia, 2007
- Gary Ward, 2008
- Tom Borland, 2013

=== Cowboy Baseball Hall of Famers ===
- Class of 1992

Joe Buck, C, 1950–51
Pete Incaviglia, OF, 1983–85
Allie P. Reynolds, RHP, 1936–38
Mickey Tettleton, OF/C, 1979–81
Jim Traber, 1B, 1980–82

- Class of 1993

Darren Dilks, LHP/DH, 1979–81
Danny Doyle, C, 1938–40
Mike Henneman, RHP, 1983–84
Joel Horlen, RHP, 1958–59
Robbie Wine, C, 1981–83

- Class of 1994

Larry Burchart, RHP, 1966–67
Michael Daniel, C, 1990–91
Monty Fariss, SS, 1986–88
John Farrell, RHP, 1981–84
Dick Soergel, RHP, 1958–60

- Class of 1996

Jeff Bronkey, RHP, 1984–86
Jeromy Burnitz, OF, 1988–90
Littleton Fowler, LHP, 1961–63
Bill Platt, Radio Announcer, 1958–95
Jim Wixson, RHP, 1960–62

- Class of 1997

Bruce Andrew, IF, 1959–61
Mike Day, C, 1982–85
Tim Pugh, RHP, 1986–89

- Class of 1998

Tom Borland, LHP, 1953–55
Bill Dobbs, LHP, 1967–69
Jim Ifland, 1B/DH, 1986–87
Robin Ventura, 3B, 1986–88

- Class of 1999

Jimmy Barragan, 1B, 1985–87
Gary Green, SS, 1981–84
Wayne Weatherly, OF, 1966–68

- Class of 2000

Jim Dobson, 3B/OF, 1959–61
Dennis Livingston, LHP, 1982–84
Mitchel Simons, 2B/OF, 1988–90

- Class of 2001

Jerry Adair, IF, 1957–58
Jason Bell, RHP, 1993–95
Dan Massari, 1B, 1972–75

- Class of 2002

Doug Dascenzo, OF, 1984–85
Tony Sellari, C, 1965–67

- Class of 2003

Brad Beanblossom, IF, 1987–90
Josh Holliday, C/INF, 1996–99
Frank Kellert, P/1B, 1947–49

- Class of 2004

Gary Ward, Coach, 1978–96

- Class of 2014

Josh Fields, 3B, 2002-04
Billy Gasparino, SS, 1997-99
Danny Thompson, SS, 1967-68

- Class of 2015

Jeff Guiel, OF, 1996-97
Rusty McNamara, OF, 1995-97

- Class of 2016

Corey Brown, OF, 2005-07
Tom Holliday, Coach, 1978-2003

- Class of 2017

Toby Greene, Coach, 1943-64
Jordy Mercer, SS/RHP, 2006-08
Ty Wright, OF, 2004-07

- Class of 2018

Tyler Mach, IF, 2006-07
Rob Walton, RHP 1983-86, Coach 2013-pres.

- Class of 2019

Andrew Heaney, LHP, 2010-12
Peter Prodanov, INF/OF, 1992-95
Matt Smith, LHP, 1998-2000

- Class of 2020

Tal Light, 3B, 1995

- Class of 2022

Rick Kranitz, RHP, 1978-79
Don Wallace, INF, 1960-62

- Class of 2023

Brad Gore, RHP, 1990-93

- Class of 2024

Scott Baker, RHP, 2001-03

== See also ==
- List of NCAA Division I baseball programs
