= Jamie D'Antona =

American baseball player (born 1982)

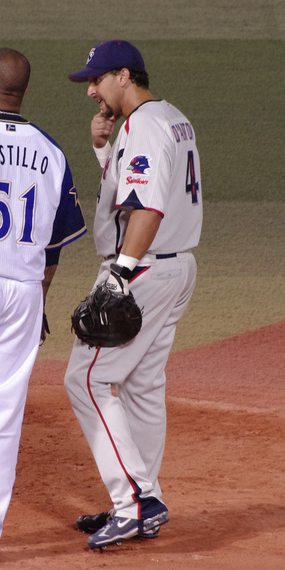
- First baseman / Third baseman
- Born: May 12, 1982 (age 44); Greenwich, Connecticut, U.S.
- Batted: Right Threw: Right

MLB debut
- July 22, 2008, for the Arizona Diamondbacks

Last MLB appearance
- September 25, 2008, for the Arizona Diamondbacks

MLB statistics
- Batting average: .176
- Home runs: 0
- Runs batted in: 1

NPB statistics
- Batting average: .263
- Home runs: 36
- Runs batted in: 133
- Stats at Baseball Reference

Teams
- Arizona Diamondbacks (2008); Tokyo Yakult Swallows (2009–2010)

James Joseph D'Antona (born May 12, 1982) is an American former professional Major League Baseball infielder with the Arizona Diamondbacks.

== Early life ==
A native of Greenwich, Connecticut, D'Antona played baseball alongside future major league pitcher Craig Breslow at Trumbull High School, where their team won the LL State Baseball championship game. A first and third baseman, D'Antona played college baseball for Wake Forest University, where he had a .354 career batting average and 58 home runs. In 2002, he played collegiate summer baseball with the Chatham A's of the Cape Cod Baseball League. His season in Chatham was chronicled by author Jim Collins in his work, The Last Best League. In 2003, D'Antona was the ACC leader in slugging percentage, home runs, and RBI.

== Minor leagues ==
Drafted by the Diamondbacks in the 2nd round of the 2003 Major League Baseball draft, D'Antona finished the 2003 season with Low Single-A Yakima, where he hit 15 home runs in only 70 games. He was also a Short-Season Single-A All-Star and Northwest League All-Star. In 2004, he played with High Single-A Lancaster, where he batted .315 and earned a late-season promotion to Double-A El Paso. With Double-A Tennessee in 2005, D'Antona struggled to hit for average, only .249, which caused his home run total to drop to 9. In 2006, again with Double-A Tennessee, he bounced back with a .312 batting average and was promoted to Triple-A Tucson for 2007.

In 2008, D'Antona batted near .400 for the first 2 1/2 months, was selected to play in the All-Star Futures Game, and won the Triple-A Home Run Derby in triple overtime against Detroit Tigers minor league infielder Mike Hessman.

== Major leagues ==
D'Antona made his major league debut on July 22, collecting his first major league hit, a single, on the same day and in his first at-bat. D'Antona was called back up to the D'Backs as a September call up.

Following the 2008 season, D'Antona was released by the Diamondbacks so that he could sign with the Tokyo Yakult Swallows.

On January 12, 2011, the Florida Marlins signed D'Antona to a minor league contract. D'Antona was released by the Marlins on February 17, 2011.

D'Antona returned to the Chatham Anglers as a hitting coach for the 2017 season.
