= Leland Davis =

American baseball player

- Pitcher

Negro league baseball debut
- 1938, for the Chicago American Giants

Last appearance
- 1938, for the Chicago American Giants

Teams
- Chicago American Giants (1938)

Leland Davis was a Negro league pitcher who played in the 1930s.

Davis played for the Chicago American Giants in 1938. In four recorded appearances on the mound, he posted a 6.28 ERA over 14.1 innings.
