= 1955 Wake Forest Demon Deacons baseball team =

American college baseball season

1955 Wake Forest Demon Deacons baseball

National champions ACC champions
- Conference: Atlantic Coast Conference
- Record: 28-7 (10-3 ACC)
- Head coach: Taylor Sanford (5th season)
- Assistant coach: Jack Stallings (1st season)

1955 Atlantic Coast Conference baseball standings
	Conf.				Overall
Team	W		L	PCT	W		L	PCT
Wake Forest ‍†‍‍^{y}	11	–	3	.786	29	–	7	.806
NC State ‍‍‍	10	–	4	.714	14	–	5	.737
North Carolina ‍‍‍	8	–	5	.615	12	–	12	.500
South Carolina ‍‍‍	7	–	7	.500	10	–	10	.500
Duke ‍‍‍	6	–	6	.500	10	–	11	.476
Maryland ‍‍‍	6	–	7	.462	9	–	11	.450
Clemson ‍‍‍	5	–	9	.357	7	–	11	.389
Virginia ‍‍‍	0	–	12	.000	6	–	16	.273
† – Conference champion y – Invited to the 1955 NCAA baseball tournament As of June 30, 1955; Rankings from Collegiate Baseball

The 1955 Wake Forest Demon Deacons baseball team represented Wake Forest University in the 1955 NCAA baseball season. The team was coached by Taylor Sanford in his 5th season at Wake Forest.

The Demon Deacons won the College World Series, defeating the Western Michigan Broncos in the championship game. Wake Forest would not return to the college world series until 2023.

== Roster ==
1955 Wake Forest Demon Deacons roster
Pitchers: 1 John Stokoe; 8 Ralph Adams; 11 Bill Walsh; 13 Lowell "Lefty" Davis; 16 Jack McGinley; 23 Buck Fichter	Infielders: 3 Art Bonzagni; 4 Lee Abbott; 6 Harold Moore; 10 Jack Bryant; 12 Billy Ray Barnes; 15 Bob Waggoner	Outfielders: 5 Tommy Cole; 7 Luther McKeel; 9 George Miller; 17 Frank McRae; Catchers: 19 Jim Horn; 20 Bob Koontz; 24 Linwood Holt

== Schedule ==
1955 Wake Forest Demon Deacons baseball game log
Regular season
Regular season

Opponent	Score	Overall record	ACC record
NC State	19-6	1-0	1-0
East Carolina	14-5	2-0	–
Michigan State	5-4	3-0	–
Maryland	6-2	4-0	2-0
Yale	5-4	4-1	–
Yale	4-2	5-1	–
Rollins	9-2	6-1	–
NC State	8-2	7-1	–
North Carolina	2-0	8-1	3-0
South Carolina	2-7	8-2	3-1
North Carolina	9-5	9-2	–
Duke	2-7	10-2	4-1
Lynchburg	10-9	11-2	–
NC State	4-7	11-3	–
Clemson	11-4	12-3	5-1
North Carolina	2-3	12-4	5-2
Duke	12-8	13-4	6-2
Maryland	4-2	14-4	7-2
Virginia	9-5	15-4	8-2
Clemson	15-11	16-4	9-2
NC State	8-9	16-5	9-3
East Carolina	11-10	17-5	–
Duke	12-5	18-5	–
Virginia	4-2	19-5	10-3

Postseason
District 3 tournament

Opponent	Score	Overall record
vs. West Virginia	5-1	20-5
vs. West Virginia	7-9	20-6
vs. West Virginia	6-5	21-6
vs. Rollins	4-0	22-6
vs. Rollins	6-2	23-6

NCAA tournament: College World Series

Date	Opponent	Site/stadium	Score	Overall record
June 10	vs. Colgate	Rosenblatt Stadium	1-0	24-6
June 12	vs. Northern Colorado	Rosenblatt Stadium	10-0	25-6
June 13	vs. Western Michigan	Rosenblatt Stadium	0-9	25-7
June 14	vs. Western Michigan	Rosenblatt Stadium	10-7	26-7
June 15	vs. Oklahoma A&M	Rosenblatt Stadium	2-0	27-7
June 16	vs. Western Michigan	Rosenblatt Stadium	7-6	28-7

== Awards and honors ==
Bill Barnes

- All-ACC Second Team

Tommy Cole

- All-ACC First Team

Lefty Davis

- All-ACC First Team

Linwood Holt

- All-America First Team
- All-ACC First Team

Luther McKeel

- All-ACC First Team

Harold Moore

- All-ACC Second Team
