= 1955 Western Michigan Broncos baseball team =

American college baseball season

1955 Western Michigan Broncos baseball

MAC Champions District IV Champions

College World Series, Runner-Up
- Conference: Mid-American Conference

Ranking
- Coaches: No. 2
- CB: No. 2
- Record: 25–7 (9–0 MAC)
- Head coach: Charlie Maher (17th season)
- Assistant coach: Don Boven
- Home stadium: Hyames Field

1955 Mid-American Conference baseball standings
	Conf.				Overall
Team	W		L	PCT	W		L	PCT
Western Michigan ‍†‍‍^{y}	9	–	0	1.000	25	–	7	.781
Bowling Green ‍‍‍	7	–	3	.700	8	–	5	.615
Western Reserve ‍‍‍	5	–	5	.500	5	–	5	.500
Miami (OH) ‍‍‍	4	–	4	.500	7	–	10	.412
Ohio ‍‍‍	4	–	4	.500	11	–	10	.524
Kent State ‍‍‍	4	–	6	.400	9	–	10	.474
Toledo ‍‍‍	3	–	9	.250	4	–	13	.235
Marshall ‍‍‍	1	–	6	.143	2	–	11	.154
† – Conference champion y – Invited to the NCAA tournament As of June 30, 1955

The 1955 Western Michigan Broncos team represented Western Michigan College in the 1955 NCAA baseball season. The Broncos played their home games at Hyames Field. The team was coached by Charlie Maher in his 17th season at Western Michigan.

The Broncos lost the College World Series, defeated by the Wake Forest in the championship game.

== Roster ==
1955 Western Michigan Broncos baseball team
Players
Coaches

#	Pos.	Name	B/T	Height	Weight	Year	Home town
	INF	Tom Czyz	/	—	—
38	INF	Leland David	/	—	—
	RHP	Roger Eggers	/R	—	—
	OF	Dick Erickson	/	—	—	Sr
	RHP	Don Finnefrock	/R	—	—
	INF	Gene Frechette	/	—	—
	LHP	Gary Graham	/L	—	—	Jr
	OF	Lowell Johnson	/	—	—	Sr
	INF	Nobert Krings	/	—	—	Sr
	OF	Bill Lajoie	/	—	—	Sr
45	INF	Wayne LaNeave	/	—	—
42	C	Freed Messner	/	—	—
	OF	Al Nagel	/	—	—
	OF	Jerry O'Connell	/	—	—
	RHP	Roger Schwarzkoff	/R	—	—	So
	INF	Jack Smith	/	—	—	Jr
	RHP	Jim Smith	/R	—	—
	RHP	Gerry Sposito	/R	—	—

Head coach

Charlie Maher

Assistant coach(es)

Don Boven

Legend

- (C) Team captain
- (S) Suspended
- (I) Ineligible
- Injured
- Current redshirt

== Schedule and results ==
Legend
Western Michigan win
Western Michigan loss
Western Michigan tie

1955 Western Michigan Broncos baseball game log

Regular season (17–3)
Opponent	Score	Overall record	MAC record
Ohio State	16–4	1–0	0–0
Ohio State	6–7	1–1	0–0
Ohio State	3–1	2–1	0–0
Marshall	10–1	3–1	1–0
Iowa	1–0	4–1	1–0
Ohio	6–5	5–1	1–0
Michigan	7–5	6–1	1–0
Kent State	4–3	7–1	2–0
Kent State	9–7	8–1	3–0
Miami (OH)	8–7	9–1	4–0
Miami (OH)	15–3	10–1	5–0
Michigan State	1–14	10–2	5–0
Toledo	16–3	11–2	6–0
Toledo	26–0	12–2	7–0
Western Reserve	7–3	13–2	8–0
Western Reserve	7–1	14–2	9–0
Glenview Navy Base	17–6	15–2	9–0
Notre Dame	0–2	15–3	9–0
Wisconsin	6–4	16–3	9–0
Wisconsin	8–5	17–3	9–0
Notre Dame	15–10	18–3	9–0

Postseason (7–4)

District IV Playoff (4–2)
Opponent	Site/stadium	Score	Overall record	MAC record
Alma	Hyames Field • Kalamazoo, Michigan	8–9	18–4	9–0
Alma	Hyames Field • Kalamazoo, Michigan	3–0	19–4	9–0
Alma	Hyames Field • Kalamazoo, Michigan	15–4	20–4	9–0
Ohio State	Hyames Field • Kalamazoo, Michigan	1–0	21–4	9–0
Ohio State	Hyames Field • Kalamazoo, Michigan	5–8	21–5	9–0
Ohio State	Hyames Field • Kalamazoo, Michigan	7–4	22–5	9–0

1955 College World Series (3–2)
Date	Opponent	Site/stadium	Score	Overall record	MAC record
June 10	vs Arizona	Omaha Municipal Stadium • Omaha, Nebraska	4–1	23–5	9–0
June 12	vs Oklahoma A&M	Omaha Municipal Stadium • Omaha, Nebraska	5–4	24–5	9–0
June 13	vs Wake Forest	Omaha Municipal Stadium • Omaha, Nebraska	9–0	25–5	9–0
June 14	vs Wake Forest	Omaha Municipal Stadium • Omaha, Nebraska	7–10	25–6	9–0
June 16	vs Wake Forest	Omaha Municipal Stadium • Omaha, Nebraska	6–7	25–7	9–0

Schedule source:

== Awards and honors ==
Bill Lajoie

- ABAC First Team All-American
