= 1955 NCAA baseball season =

Baseball season

NCAA Tournament

College World Series
- Champions: Wake Forest (1st title)
- Runners-up: Western Michigan (2nd CWS Appearance)
- Winning coach: Taylor Sanford (1st title)
- MOP: Tom Borland (Oklahoma A&M)

Seasons
- ← 1954 1956 →

The 1955 NCAA baseball season, play of college baseball in the United States organized by the National Collegiate Athletic Association (NCAA) began in the spring of 1955. The season progressed through the regular season and concluded with the 1955 College World Series. The College World Series, held for the ninth time in 1955, consisted of one team from each of eight geographical districts and was held in Omaha, Nebraska at Johnny Rosenblatt Stadium as a double-elimination tournament. Wake Forest claimed the championship.

== Conference winners ==
This is a partial list of conference champions from the 1955 season. Each of the eight geographical districts chose, by various methods, the team that would represent them in the NCAA Tournament. 12 teams earned automatic bids by winning their conference championship while 13 teams earned at-large selections.

Conference	Regular season winner
Atlantic Coast Conference	Wake Forest
Big Seven Conference	Oklahoma
Big Ten Conference	Ohio State
CIBA	Southern California
EIBL	Harvard
Mid-American Conference	Western Michigan
Pacific Coast Conference	Oregon
Rocky Mountain Conference	Colorado State
Southeastern Conference	Alabama
Southern Conference	West Virginia
Southwest Conference	Texas A&M
Yankee Conference	Connecticut

== Conference standings ==
The following is an incomplete list of conference standings:

1955 Atlantic Coast Conference baseball standings
	Conf.				Overall
Team	W		L	PCT	W		L	PCT
Wake Forest ‍†‍‍^{y}	11	–	3	.786	29	–	7	.806
NC State ‍‍‍	10	–	4	.714	14	–	5	.737
North Carolina ‍‍‍	8	–	5	.615	12	–	12	.500
South Carolina ‍‍‍	7	–	7	.500	10	–	10	.500
Duke ‍‍‍	6	–	6	.500	10	–	11	.476
Maryland ‍‍‍	6	–	7	.462	9	–	11	.450
Clemson ‍‍‍	5	–	9	.357	7	–	11	.389
Virginia ‍‍‍	0	–	12	.000	6	–	16	.273
† – Conference champion y – Invited to the 1955 NCAA baseball tournament As of June 30, 1955; Rankings from Collegiate Baseball

1955 Big Seven Conference baseball standings
	Conf.				Overall
Team	W		L	PCT	W		L	PCT
Oklahoma ‍†‍‍^{y}	9	–	1	.900	13	–	10	.565
Missouri ‍‍‍	9	–	3	.750	14	–	6	.700
Nebraska ‍‍‍	10	–	4	.714	15	–	5	.750
Colorado ‍‍‍	5	–	6	.455		–		–
Iowa State ‍‍‍	5	–	8	.385		–		–
Kansas State ‍‍‍	2	–	10	.167	4	–	11	.267
Kansas ‍‍‍	2	–	10	.167	6	–	16	.273
† – Conference champion y – Invited to the NCAA tournament As of June 30, 1955; Rankings from Collegiate Baseball

1955 Eastern Intercollegiate Baseball League baseball standings
	Conf.						Overall
Team	W		L		T	PCT	W		L		T	PCT
Harvard ‍†‍‍	8	–	1	–	0	.889	18	–	5	–	0	.783
Yale ‍‍‍	8	–	2	–	0	.800	20	–	10	–	0	.667
Brown ‍‍‍	5	–	4	–	0	.556	10	–	8	–	0	.556
Princeton ‍‍‍	5	–	4	–	0	.556	14	–	8	–	0	.636
Army ‍‍‍	4	–	5	–	0	.444	10	–	8	–	2	.550
Navy ‍‍‍	3	–	5	–	0	.375	9	–	9	–	0	.500
Penn ‍‍‍	3	–	5	–	0	.375	9	–	11	–	0	.450
Dartmouth ‍‍‍	3	–	6	–	0	.333	11	–	15	–	0	.423
Columbia ‍‍‍	2	–	7	–	0	.222	3	–	12	–	0	.200
Cornell ‍‍‍	2	–	7	–	0	.222	9	–	8	–	0	.529
† – Conference champion

1955 Mid-American Conference baseball standings
	Conf.				Overall
Team	W		L	PCT	W		L	PCT
Western Michigan ‍†‍‍^{y}	9	–	0	1.000	25	–	7	.781
Bowling Green ‍‍‍	7	–	3	.700	8	–	5	.615
Western Reserve ‍‍‍	5	–	5	.500	5	–	5	.500
Miami (OH) ‍‍‍	4	–	4	.500	7	–	10	.412
Ohio ‍‍‍	4	–	4	.500	11	–	10	.524
Kent State ‍‍‍	4	–	6	.400	9	–	10	.474
Toledo ‍‍‍	3	–	9	.250	4	–	13	.235
Marshall ‍‍‍	1	–	6	.143	2	–	11	.154
† – Conference champion y – Invited to the NCAA tournament As of June 30, 1955

1955 Missouri Valley Conference baseball standings
	Conf.				Overall
Team	W		L	PCT	W		L	PCT
Oklahoma A&M ‍†‍‍^{y}	8	–	0	1.000	27	–	3	.900
Saint Louis ‍‍‍	3	–	2	.600		–		–
Detroit ‍‍‍	2	–	2	.500	8	–	9	.471
Bradley ‍‍‍	2	–	3	.400	16	–	5	.762
Houston ‍‍‍	3	–	5	.375	6	–	13	.316
Tulsa ‍‍‍	3	–	6	.333	6	–	12	.333
Wichita State ‍‍‍	3	–	6	.333	4	–	9	.308
† – Conference champion y – Invited to the College World Series; As of June 30, 1955; Rankings from Coaches' Poll

1955 Pacific Coast Conference baseball standings
	Conf.						Overall
Team	W		L		T	PCT	W		L		T	PCT
North Division
Oregon ‍†‍‍	10	–	3	–	0	.769	18	–	8	–	0	.692
Oregon State ‍‍‍	8	–	4	–	0	.667	15	–	10	–	0	.600
Washington State ‍‍‍	6	–	4	–	0	.600	13	–	8	–	1	.614
Washington ‍‍‍	7	–	7	–	0	.500	18	–	11	–	0	.621
Idaho ‍‍‍	0	–	13	–	0	.000	9	–	15	–	0	.375
California Intercollegiate Baseball Association
USC ‍†‍‍^{y}	12	–	3	–	0	.800	23	–	5	–	0	.821
UCLA ‍‍‍	9	–	6	–	0	.600	22	–	9	–	1	.703
Stanford ‍‍‍	9	–	7	–	0	.563	21	–	13	–	0	.618
California ‍‍‍	7	–	8	–	0	.467	17	–	16	–	0	.515
Santa Clara ‍‍‍	1	–	14	–	0	.067	11	–	19	–	0	.367
† – Conference champion y – Invited to the NCAA tournament

1955 Rocky Mountain Conference baseball standings
	Conf.				Overall
Team	W		L	PCT	W		L	PCT
Colorado State ‍†‍‍^{y}	10	–	0	1.000	25	–	4	.862
Western State ‍‍‍	2	–	2	.500		–		–
Colorado Mines ‍‍‍	2	–	6	.250	3	–	8	.273
Colorado College ‍‍‍	2	–	8	.200	4	–	8	.333
† – Conference champion y – Invited to the College World Series; As of June 30, 1955; Rankings from Collegiate Baseball

== College World Series ==
The 1955 season marked the ninth NCAA Baseball Tournament, which consisted of the eight team College World Series. The College World Series was held in Omaha, Nebraska. The eight teams played a double-elimination format, with Wake Forest claiming their first championship with a 7–6 win over Western Michigan in the final.

Upper round 1
Oklahoma A&M	5
Springfield	1
Western Michigan	4
Arizona	1
Colorado State College	2
Southern California	1
Wake Forest	1
Colgate	0

Upper round 2
Oklahoma A&M	4
Western Michigan	5
Colorado State College	0
Wake Forest	10
Lower round 1
Springfield	0
Arizona	6
Southern California	4
Colgate	6

Upper final
Western Michigan	9
Wake Forest	0
Lower round 2
Colorado State College	0
Arizona	20
Oklahoma A&M	4
Colgate	2

Semifinals
Western Michigan	7
Wake Forest	10
Arizona	4
Oklahoma A&M	5^{12}

Preliminary final
Wake Forest	2
Oklahoma A&M	0

Final
Western Michigan	6
Wake Forest	7
