= 1955 Arizona Wildcats baseball team =

American university baseball season

1955 Arizona Wildcats baseball

District VI champions

College World Series, T-5th
- Conference: Border Conference
- Record: 41–8 (6–0 Border)
- Head coach: Frank Sancet (6th season)
- Home stadium: UA Field

The 1955 Arizona Wildcats baseball team represented the University of Arizona in the 1955 NCAA baseball season. The Wildcats played their home games at UA Field. The team was coached by Frank Sancet in his sixth year at Arizona.

The Wildcats won the District VI Playoff to advance to the College World Series, where they were defeated by the Oklahoma A&M Cowboys.

== Roster ==
1955 Arizona Wildcats baseball team
Players
Coaches

#	Pos.	Name	B/T	Height	Weight	Year	Home town
	LHP	Marcel Bachelier	/L	—	—	Sr
	RHP	Buzz Boltz	/R	—	—
	RHP	Jerry Carter	/R	—	—
	INF	Rudy Castro	/R	—	—	Sr	Tucson, Arizona
		Tom Clarkson	/	—	—	So
		Jack Davis	/	—	—	Jr
		Don Gile	R/R	6 ft 6 in (1.98 m)	220 lb (100 kg)	Sr
35	INF	Russ Gragg	L/R	6 ft 1 in (1.85 m)	175 lb (79 kg)	Sr
		Dick Griesser	/	—	—	Jr
	RHP	Don Hyman	/R	—	—
	RHP	Jerry Ikeda	/R	—	—
		Ted Lazovich	/	—	—
	RHP	Don Lee	/R	—	—
		Don McGinnis	/	—	—	Jr
		Lee Myers	/	—	—	Jr
	LHP	Fred Navarro	/L	—	—
	RHP	Ernie Oosterveen	/R	—	—
		Hadie Redd	/	—	—
	RHP	Benny Rincon	/R	—	—
	INF	Craig Sorensen	/	—	—	So
		Jim Stearn	/	—	—
	OF	Gus Stiles	/	—	—	Jr
		Don Swaim	/	—	—
	INF	Tom Tellez	/R	—	—
	RHP	Carl Thomas	R/R	6 ft 5 in (1.96 m)	245 lb (111 kg)	Jr	Minneapolis, Minnesota
	LHP	Jerry Tolle	/L	—	—
		Tom Tomooka	/	—	—
	INF	Tom Wright	/R	—	—
	C	Sam Zivkovich	/R	—	—

Head coach

45 Frank Sancet

Assistant coach(es)

Legend

- (C) Team captain
- (S) Suspended
- (I) Ineligible
- Injured
- Current redshirt

== Schedule ==
1955 Arizona Wildcats baseball game log
Regular season
March (13–1)

#	Date	Opponent	Site/stadium	Score	Overall record	Border Record
1	March 5	Darr Aero Tech	UA Field • Tucson, Arizona	12–3	1–0	–
2	March 11	Sul Ross	UA Field • Tucson, Arizona	7–4	2–0	–
3	March 12	Sul Ross	UA Field • Tucson, Arizona	23–1	3–0	–
4	March 17	Marine Corps Base Camp Pendleton	UA Field • Tucson, Arizona	11–5	4–0	–
5	March 18	Marine Corps Base Camp Pendleton	UA Field • Tucson, Arizona	7–6	5–0	–
6	March 19	Pepperdine	UA Field • Tucson, Arizona	15–12	6–0	–
7	March 21	Utah	UA Field • Tucson, Arizona	14–2	7–0	–
8	March 22	Utah	UA Field • Tucson, Arizona	3–2	8–0	–
9	March 23	Utah	UA Field • Tucson, Arizona	13–6	9–0	–
10	March 24	Utah	UA Field • Tucson, Arizona	13–4	10–0	–
11	March 25	Utah	UA Field • Tucson, Arizona	5–4	11–0	–
12	March 28	Wyoming	UA Field • Tucson, Arizona	8–4	12–0	–
13	March 29	Wyoming	UA Field • Tucson, Arizona	5–15	12–1	–
14	March 30	Wyoming	UA Field • Tucson, Arizona	9–0	13–1	–

April (17–4)

#	Date	Opponent	Site/stadium	Score	Overall record	Border Record
15	April 1	New Mexico A&M	UA Field • Tucson, Arizona	29–3	14–1	1–0
16	April 2	New Mexico A&M	UA Field • Tucson, Arizona	11–1	15–1	2–0
17	April 4	Iowa	UA Field • Tucson, Arizona	6–5	16–1	2–0
18	April 5	Iowa	UA Field • Tucson, Arizona	27–7	17–1	2–0
19	April 6	Iowa	UA Field • Tucson, Arizona	3–2	18–1	2–0
20	April 7	Iowa	UA Field • Tucson, Arizona	7–6	19–1	2–0
21	April 9	Iowa	UA Field • Tucson, Arizona	17–18	19–2	2–0
22	April 9	Iowa	UA Field • Tucson, Arizona	4–1	20–2	2–0
23	April 11	at Pepperdine	Unknown • Malibu, California	7–5	21–2	2–0
24	April 12	at UCLA	Joe E. Brown Field • Los Angeles, California	2–9	21–3	2–0
25	April 12	at Fresno State	Unknown • Fresno, California	2–4	21–4	2–0
26	April 13	at Fresno State	Unknown • Fresno, California	6–2	22–4	2–0
27	April 15	at Pacific	Billy Hebert Field • Stockton, California	7–4	23–4	2–0
28	April 16	at Pacific	Billy Hebert Field • Tucson, Arizona	13–4	24–4	2–0
29	April 20	Davis–Monthan Air Force Base	UA Field • Tucson, Arizona	25–3	25–4	2–0
30	April 23	at Arizona State	Unknown • Tempe, Arizona	8–3	26–4	3–0
31	April 23	at Arizona State	Unknown • Tempe, Arizona	4–0	27–4	4–0
32	April 26	Davis–Monthan Air Force Base	UA Field • Tucson, Arizona	2–1	28–4	4–0
33	April 28	Naval Training Center	UA Field • Tucson, Arizona	18–0	29–4	4–0
34	April 29	Naval Training Center	UA Field • Tucson, Arizona	5–6	29–5	4–0
35	April 30	Naval Training Center	UA Field • Tucson, Arizona	8–2	30–5	4–0

May (7–0)

#	Date	Opponent	Site/stadium	Score	Overall record	Border Record
36	May 2	Naval Training Center	UA Field • Tucson, Arizona	5–4	31–5	4–0
37	May 3	Naval Training Center	UA Field • Tucson, Arizona	7–0	32–5	4–0
38	May 4	Naval Training Center	UA Field • Tucson, Arizona	12–4	33–5	4–0
39	May 6	Arizona State	UA Field • Tucson, Arizona	4–1	34–5	5–0
40	May 6	Arizona State	UA Field • Tucson, Arizona	5–0	35–5	6–0
41	May 10	Davis–Monthan Air Force Base	UA Field • Tucson, Arizona	9–2	36–5	6–0
42	May 15	Hayden	UA Field • Tucson, Arizona	15–8	37–5	6–0

Postseason
NCAA District VI Playoff (3–0)

#	Date	Opponent	Site/stadium	Score	Overall record	Border Record
43	May 30	at Texas A&M	Kyle Baseball Field • College Station, Texas	6–2	38–5	6–0
44	May 31	at Texas A&M	Kyle Baseball Field • College Station, Texas	0–5	38–6	6–0
45	June 1	at Texas A&M	Kyle Baseball Field • College Station, Texas	2–1	39–6	6–0

College World Series (1–2)

#	Date	Opponent	Site/stadium	Score	Overall record	Border Record
46	June 10	vs Western Michigan	Omaha Municipal Stadium • Omaha, Nebraska	1–4	39–7	6–0
47	June 11	vs Springfield	Johnny Rosenblatt Stadium • Omaha, Nebraska	6–0	40–7	6–0
48	June 13	vs Colorado State	Johnny Rosenblatt Stadium • Omaha, Nebraska	20–0	41–7	6–0
49	June 14	vs Oklahoma A&M	Johnny Rosenblatt Stadium • Omaha, Nebraska	4–5	41–8	6–0

== Awards and honors ==
Russ Gragg

Second Team All-American American Baseball Coaches Association

Craig Sorensen

Third Team All-American American Baseball Coaches Association

Carl Thomas

First Team All-American American Baseball Coaches Association. Thomas also tied an NCAA single-game record with 15 strikeouts against Springfield College in the College World Series.
