= Colgate Raiders baseball =

Colgate Raiders
- Founded: 1896
- Defunct: 1994
- University: Colgate University
- Conference: Patriot League (1991–1994); North Division
- Location: Hamilton, New York
- Nickname: Raiders
- Colors: Maroon and white

College World Series appearances
- 1955

NCAA regional champions
- 1955

NCAA tournament appearances
- 1955, 1960, 1966, 1969

The Colgate Raiders baseball team was a college baseball team fielded by Colgate University from 1886 until 1996. The university announced the shuttering of the program in 1993 due to Title IX equity concerns.

The Raiders played in the NCAA Division I Baseball Championship four times, reaching the College World Series in 1955. Fifteen players from Colgate later played in Major League Baseball.

== NCAA Tournament appearances ==
Colgate participated in the NCAA Division I baseball tournament four times. They had a record of 5–7.

Year	Region	Opponent	Result
1955	District 2	Penn State; Ithaca; Wake Forest; Southern California; Oklahoma A&M	W 7–4; W 7–6; L 0–1; W 6–4; L 2–4
1960	District 2	Delaware	L 4–15
1966	District 2	Lafayette; Rutgers	L 0–15; L 2–3
1969	District 2	Seton Hall; NYU	W 4–3; L 5–1; W 7–1; L 1–5
