= 1961 NCAA University Division baseball rankings =

1961 NCAA University Division baseball season

Tournament

College World Series
- Champions: Southern California
- Runners-up: Oklahoma State
- MOP: Littleton Fowler (Oklahoma State)

Seasons
- ← 1960 1962 →

The following poll makes up the 1961 NCAA University Division baseball rankings. Collegiate Baseball Newspaper published its first human poll of the top 20 teams in college baseball in 1957. The 1961 season was the first to rank the top 30 teams.

== Collegiate Baseball ==
Currently, only the final poll from the 1961 season is available.

Rank	Team
1	Southern California
2	Oklahoma State
3	Boston College
4	Syracuse
5	Western Michigan
6	Duke
7	Colorado State College
8	Texas
9	Fresno State
10	Arizona
11	Navy
12	Michigan
13	Arizona State
14	California
15	Indiana
16	Minnesota
17	Florida State
18	Cincinnati
19	Connecticut
20	Detroit
21	North Carolina
22	LSU
23	St. John's
24	West Virginia
25	Baylor
26	Delaware
27	Wake Forest
28	Washington State
29	Villanova
30	Florida A&M
