= 1961 College Baseball All-America Team =

This is a list of college baseball players named first team All-Americans for the 1961 NCAA University Division baseball season. From 1947 to 1963, the American Baseball Coaches Association was the only generally recognized All-America selector, so any player selected by the ABCA is considered a "consensus" All-American.

== Key ==
A	American Baseball Coaches Association
	Member of the National College Baseball Hall of Fame
	Consensus All-American – selected the ABCA

== All-Americans ==
Position	Name	School	#	A
Pitcher	Bill Faul	Cincinnati	1	✓
Pitcher	Jim Wixson	Oklahoma State	1	✓
Catcher	Bill Freehan	Michigan	1	✓
First baseman	Willie Ryan	USC	1	✓
Second baseman	Charles Shoemaker	Arizona	1	✓
Shortstop	Frank Quilici	Western Michigan	1	✓
Third baseman	Peter Hall	Rutgers	1	✓
Outfielder	Chuck Knutson	Texas	1	✓
Outfielder	Jim Mooring	North Carolina	1	✓
Outfielder	Joe Nossek	Ohio	1	✓

== See also ==
- List of college baseball awards
