= 1949 Texas Longhorns baseball team =

American college baseball season

1949 Texas Longhorns baseball

National champions SWC champions
- Conference: Southwest Conference
- Record: 22-4 (12–3 SWC)
- Head coach: Bibb Falk (7th year)
- Home stadium: Clark Field

1949 Southwest Conference baseball standings
	Conf.				Overall
Team	W		L	PCT	W		L	PCT
Texas ‍†‍‍^{y}	12	–	3	.800	23	–	7	.767
Texas A&M ‍‍‍	10	–	4	.714	17	–	8	.680
Baylor ‍‍‍	9	–	6	.600	17	–	12	.586
SMU ‍‍‍	6	–	9	.400	8	–	12	.400
TCU ‍‍‍	4	–	11	.267	6	–	14	.300
Rice ‍‍‍	3	–	11	.214	4	–	14	.222
† – Conference champion y – Invited to the NCAA tournament As of June 30, 1949; Rankings from Collegiate Baseball

The 1949 Texas Longhorns baseball team represented the University of Texas in the 1949 NCAA baseball season. The Longhorns played their home games at Clark Field. The team was coached by Bibb Falk in his 7th season at Texas.

The Longhorns won the College World Series, defeating the Wake Forest Demon Deacons in the championship game.

== Roster ==
1949 Texas Longhorns roster
Pitchers: James Ehrler; Charlie Gorin; Murray Wall; Catchers: Dan Watson	Infielders: Tom Hamilton; Al Joe Hunt; Frank Kana; Don Russell; Jim Shamblin; Ben Tompkins; Jack Webb	Outfielders: Rob Brock; Don Cavness; Ed Kneuper; Charlie Munson; Frank Womack

== Schedule ==
Legend
Texas win
Texas loss

1949 Texas Longhorns baseball game log
Regular season

March
Date	Opponent	Site/stadium	Score	Overall record	SWC record
March 21	Ohio State	Clark Field • Austin, TX	W 11–5	1–0	
March 22	Ohio State	Clark Field • Austin, TX	W 7–4	2–0	
March 23	Ohio State	Clark Field • Austin, TX	L 1–5	2–1	
March 25	Oklahoma	Clark Field • Austin, TX	W 5–1	3–1	
March 26	Oklahoma	Clark Field • Austin, TX	W 7–5	4–1	
March 29	Hardin-Simmons	Clark Field • Austin, TX	W 4–2	5–1	
March 31	Baylor	Clark Field • Austin, TX	W 10–4	6–1	1–0

April
Date	Opponent	Site/stadium	Score	Overall record	SWC record
April 5	Rice	Clark Field • Austin, TX	W 15–7	7–1	2–0
April 5	Rice	Clark Field • Austin, TX	W 5–0	8–1	3–0
April 8	at TCU	Fort Worth, TX	W 7–0	9–1	4–0
April 9	at TCU	Fort Worth, TX	W 8–0	10–1	5–0
April 12	at SMU	Armstrong Field • Dallas, TX	W 11–1	11–1	6–0
April 21	Texas A&M	Clark Field • Austin, TX	W 14–4	12–1	7–0
April 29	at Baylor	Ferrell Field • Waco, TX	L 5–11	12–2	7–1
April 30	at Baylor	Ferrell Field • Waco, TX	L 2–3	12–3	7–2

May
Date	Opponent	Site/stadium	Score	Overall record	SWC record
May 5	SMU	Clark Field • Austin, TX	W 9–0	13–3	8–2
May 6	SMU	Clark Field • Austin, TX	W 12–5	14–3	9–2
May 10	TCU	Clark Field • Austin, TX	W 11–6	15–3	10–2
May 11	at Rice	Houston, TX	W 9–4	16–3	11–2
May 13	at Texas A&M	Kyle Baseball Field • College Station, TX	L 1–6	16–4	11–3
May 14	at Texas A&M	Kyle Baseball Field • College Station, TX	W 6–1	17–4	12–3

Postseason

NCAA Region C
Date	Opponent	Site/stadium	Score	Overall record	Regional Record
June 16	Oklahoma A&M	Clark Field • Austin, TX	W 3–2	18–4	1–0
June 17	Oklahoma A&M	Clark Field • Austin, TX	W 7–3	19–4	2–0

College World Series
Date	Opponent	Site/stadium	Score	Overall record	CWS record
June 22	St. John's	Lawrence Stadium • Wichita, KS	W 7–1	20–4	1–0
June 23	Wake Forest	Lawrence Stadium • Wichita, KS	W 8–1	21–4	2–0
June 25	Wake Forest	Lawrence Stadium • Wichita, KS	W 10–3	22–4	3–0

== Awards and honors ==
Ed Kneuper

- First Team All-American
- First Team All-SWC

Tom Hamilton

- First Team All-American
- First Team All-SWC
- College World Series Most Outstanding Player

Jim Shamblin

- First Team All-SWC

Murray Wall

- First Team All-American
- First Team All-SWC

Don Watson

- First Team All-SWC
