= 1949 USC Trojans baseball team =

American college baseball season

1949 USC Trojans baseball

CIBA Champions PCC Tournament champions Region D Champions

College World Series, 3rd
- Conference: California Intercollegiate Baseball Association
- Record: 23–6 (12–2 CIBA)
- Head coach: Sam Barry (17th year); Rod Dedeaux (8th year)
- Home stadium: Bovard Field

1949 Pacific Coast Conference baseball standings
	Conf.				Overall
Team	W		L	PCT	W		L	PCT
North Division
Washington State ‍†‍‍	12	–	4	.750	33	–	9	.786
Oregon ‍‍‍	10	–	4	.714	18	–	7	.720
Oregon State ‍‍‍	8	–	7	.533	15	–	8	.652
Washington ‍‍‍	6	–	9	.400	6	–	9	.400
Idaho ‍‍‍	2	–	14	.125	4	–	22	.154
California Intercollegiate Baseball Association
USC ‍†‍‍^{y}	12	–	2	.857	23	–	6	.793
Santa Clara ‍‍‍	9	–	6	.600	17	–	10	.630
UCLA ‍‍‍	8	–	6	.571	21	–	15	.583
Stanford ‍‍‍	7	–	8	.467	18	–	12	.600
California ‍‍‍	5	–	10	.333	31	–	17	.646
St. Mary's ‍‍‍	3	–	12	.200	0	–	0	–
† – Conference champion y – Invited to the NCAA tournament

The 1949 USC Trojans baseball team represented the University of Southern California in the 1949 NCAA baseball season. The Trojans played their home games at Bovard Field. The team was coached by Sam Barry serving his 17th year and Rod Dedeaux in his 8th year at USC.

The Trojans won the California Intercollegiate Baseball Association championship, the Pacific Coast Conference Tournament and advanced to the College World Series, where they were defeated by the Wake Forest Demon Deacons.

== Roster ==
1949 USC Trojans baseball team
Players
Coaches

#	Pos.	Name	B/T	Height	Weight	Year	Home town
	INF	Jim Brideweser	R/R	6 ft 0 in (1.83 m)	165 lb (75 kg)	Sr	Los Angeles, California
	INF	Hank Cedillos	/	—	—	Sr
		Robert Cleveland	/	—	—
	RHP	Dick Fiedler	R/R	6 ft 4 in (1.93 m)	205 lb (93 kg)	Sr
	OF	Chuck Freeman	/	—	—	Jr
	OF	Serge Freeman	/	—	—	Jr
	INF	Dave Haserot	/	—	—	Jr
	INF	George Hefner	/	—	—		Los Angeles, California
	RHP	Maynard Horst	/R	—	—	Jr
	OF	Al Karan	/	—	—	So
		Mas Kinoshita	/	—	—
	INF	Art Mazmanian	R/R	5 ft 9 in (1.75 m)	229 lb (104 kg)	Sr	Los Angeles, California
	C	Bruce McKelvey	R/R	6 ft 2 in (1.88 m)	190 lb (86 kg)	Sr	San Pedro, California
	LHP	Don Pender	/L	—	—
	OF	Chuck Pryor	/	—	—	Jr
	INF	Rudy Regalado	R/R	6 ft 1 in (1.85 m)	185 lb (84 kg)	Jr	Glendale, California
	OF	Tom Riach	/	—	—	So
	OF	Jay Roundy	/	—	—
	P	Jack Schlarb	/	—	—	So
	OF	Bill Sharman	R/R	6 ft 2 in (1.88 m)	190 lb (86 kg)	Jr	Porterville, California
	C	Bob Zuber	R/R	5 ft 10 in (1.78 m)	175 lb (79 kg)	Jr	Los Angeles, California

Head coach

Sam Barry
Rod Dedeaux

Assistant coach(es)

Legend

- (C) Team captain
- (S) Suspended
- (I) Ineligible
- Injured
- Current redshirt

== Schedule ==
Legend
USC win
USC loss

1949 USC Trojans baseball game log
Regular season

March (2–0)
Date	Opponent	Site/stadium	Score	Overall record	CIBA record
March 25	San Diego State	Bovard Field • Los Angeles, CA	W 10–6	1–0	
March 26	San Diego State	Bovard Field • Los Angeles, CA	W 3–1	2–0	

April (9–2)
Date	Opponent	Site/stadium	Score	Overall record	CIBA record
April 1	Santa Clara	Bovard Field • Los Angeles, CA	L 4–5	2–1	0–1
April 2	Santa Clara	Bovard Field • Los Angeles, CA	L 3–4	2–2	0–2
April 8	at UCLA	Joe E. Brown Field • Los Angeles, CA	W 21–4	3–2	1–2
April 9	UCLA	Bovard Field • Los Angeles, CA	W 10–8	4–2	2–2
April 12	Loyola Marymount	Bovard Field • Los Angeles, CA	W 10–1	5–2	2–2
April 17	at UC Santa Barbara	Santa Barbara, CA	W 12–2	6–2	2–2
April 19	at Loyola Marymount	Los Angeles, CA	W 11–6	7–2	2–2
April 22	at Santa Clara	Santa Clara, CA	W 4–1	8–2	3–2
April 23	at Stanford	Sunken Diamond • Stanford, CA	W 9–7	9–2	4–2
April 29	California	Bovard Field • Los Angeles, CA	W 7–4	10–2	5–2
April 30	California	Bovard Field • Los Angeles, CA	W 3–0	11–2	6–2

May (7–0)
Date	Opponent	Site/stadium	Score	Overall record	CIBA record
May 6	Saint Mary's	Bovard Field • Los Angeles, CA	W 4–1	12–2	7–2
May 7	Saint Mary's	Bovard Field • Los Angeles, CA	W 18–9	13–2	8–2
May 10	San Francisco	Bovard Field • Los Angeles, CA	W 13–1	14–2	8–2
May 13	Stanford	Bovard Field • Los Angeles, CA	W 4–2	15–2	9–2
May 14	Stanford	Bovard Field • Los Angeles, CA	W 4–1	16–2	10–2
May 20	at Saint Mary's	Louis Guisto Field • Moraga, CA	W 14–5	17–2	11–2
May 21	at California	Edwards Field • Berkeley, CA	W 4–3	18–2	12–2

Postseason

Pacific Coast Conference Playoff (2–1)
Date	Opponent	Site/stadium	Score	Overall record	Playoff record
May 27	Washington State	Bovard Field • Los Angeles, CA	L 2–15	18–3	0–1
May 28	Washington State	Bovard Field • Los Angeles, CA	W 2–1	19–3	1–1
May 28	Washington State	Bovard Field • Los Angeles, CA	W 9–2	20–3	2–1

Region D Playoff (2–1)
Date	Opponent	Site/stadium	Score	Overall record	Regional Record
June 15	Colorado State	Bovard Field • Los Angeles, CA	W 12–2	21–3	1–0
June 16	Colorado State	Bovard Field • Los Angeles, CA	L 2–6	21–4	1–1
June 16	Colorado State	Bovard Field • Los Angeles, CA	W 8–7	22–4	2–1

College World Series (1–2)
Date	Opponent	Site/stadium	Score	Overall record	CWS record
June 22	vs Wake Forest	Lawrence Stadium • Wichita, KS	L 1–2	22–5	0–1
June 23	vs St. John's	Lawrence Stadium • Wichita, KS	W 12–4	23–5	1–1
June 24	vs Wake Forest	Lawrence Stadium • Wichita, KS	L 1–2	23–6	1–2

== Awards and honors ==
Jim Brideweser

- First Team All-American American Baseball Coaches Association
- First Team All-CIBA

Hank Cedillos

- Second Team All-CIBA

Art Mazmanian

- Second Team All-American American Baseball Coaches Association
- First Team All-CIBA

Bruce McKelvey

- First Team All-CIBA

Don Pender

- First Team All-CIBA

Rudy Regalado

- Second Team All-CIBA

Bill Sharman

- Second Team All-CIBA

Jack Schlarb

- Second Team All-CIBA

Bob Zube

- First Team All-CIBA
