= 1961 NCAA University Division baseball tournament =

American college sports championship

- Season: 1961
- Teams: 25
- Finals site: Johnny Rosenblatt Stadium; Omaha, NE
- Champions: Southern California (3rd title)
- Runner-up: Oklahoma State (5th CWS Appearance)
- Winning coach: Rod Dedeaux (3rd title)
- MOP: Littleton Fowler (Oklahoma State)

The 1961 NCAA University Division baseball tournament was played at the end of the 1961 NCAA University Division baseball season to determine the national champion of college baseball. The tournament concluded with eight teams competing in the College World Series, a double-elimination tournament in its fifteenth year. Eight regional districts sent representatives to the College World Series with preliminary rounds within each district serving to determine each representative. These events would later become known as regionals. Each district had its own format for selecting teams, resulting in 25 teams participating in the tournament at the conclusion of their regular season, and in some cases, after a conference tournament. The College World Series was held in Omaha, NE from June 9 to June 14. The fifteenth tournament's champion was Southern California, coached by Rod Dedeaux. The Most Outstanding Player was Littleton Fowler of runner-up Oklahoma State.

== Tournament ==
=== District 1 ===
Games played at Springfield, Massachusetts.

First Round
Boston College	11
Springfield	8
Connecticut	15
Colby	1
Lower round 1
Springfield	9
Colby	2

Semi-Finals
Boston College	4
Connecticut	1
Lower final
Connecticut	3
Springfield	1

Finals
Boston College	2	14
Connecticut	3	4

=== District 2 ===
Games played at Syracuse, New York.

Semifinals
St. John's	10
Villanova	4
Syracuse	2
Delaware	0

Finals
Syracuse	12
St. John's	5

=== District 3 ===
Games played at Gastonia, North Carolina.

Upper round 1
Florida State	3
West Virginia	1

Upper final
Duke	7
Florida State	2
Lower final
Florida State	3
West Virginia	4

Final
Duke	7	—
West Virginia	3	—

=== District 4 ===
Games played at Ann Arbor, Michigan.

Upper round 1
Western Michigan	3
Detroit	1
Cincinnati	3^{10}
Michigan	1
Lower round 1
Detroit	3
Michigan	6^{10}

Upper final
Western Michigan	8
Cincinnati	1
Lower final
Cincinnati	1
Michigan	2

Final
Western Michigan	4^{14}	–
Michigan	3	–

=== District 5 ===
Games played at Stillwater, Oklahoma.

Finals
Oklahoma State	10	11	—
Northern Iowa	0	8	—

=== District 6 ===
Games played at Austin, Texas.

Finals
Texas	8	5	—
Arizona	2	4	—

=== District 7 ===
Games played at Laramie, Wyoming.

Upper round 1
Wyoming	3
Colorado State College	2

Upper final
Air Force	10
Wyoming	12
Lower final
Air Force	6
Colorado State College	10

Final
Wyoming	12	1
Colorado State College	16	12

=== District 8 ===
Semifinals; Los Angeles, California				Finals; Pullman, Washington
Southern California	4	4	10
Fresno State	1	6	6
Fresno State	1	6	6	Southern California	13	10	—
				Washington State	6	4	—

== College World Series ==
=== Participants ===
School	Conference	Record (conference)	Head coach	CWS appearances	CWS best finish	CWS record
Boston College	Independent	16–4	Ed Peligrini	2 (last: 1960)	4th (1953)	3–4
Colorado State College (Note: Colorado State College is currently known as the University of Northern Colorado. Not to be confused with Colorado State University, then known as Colorado A&M.)	RMC	28–6 (14–0)	Pete Butler	7 (last: 1960)	5th (1955)	2–14
Duke	ACC	15–9 (11–3)	Ace Parker	2 (last: 1953)	5th (1952, 1953)	2–4
Oklahoma State	Big 8	24–1 (18–1)	Toby Greene	4 (last: 1960)	1st (1959)	12–7
Syracuse	Independent	16–3	Ted Kleinhans	0 (last: none)	none	0–0
Texas	SWC	22–4–2 (11–3)	Bibb Falk	5 (last: 1957)	1st (1949, 1950)	14–7
Southern California	CIBA	31–7 (12–4)	Rod Dedeaux	6 (last: 1960)	1st (1948, 1958)	14–10
Western Michigan	MAC	18–6 (11–0)	Charlie Maher	4 (last: 1959)	2nd (1955)	8–8

=== Results ===
==== Bracket ====
Upper round 1
Oklahoma State	3
Duke	2
Syracuse	12
Colorado State College	5
Boston College	3
Western Michigan	2
Southern California	8
Texas	6

Upper round 2
Oklahoma State	12
Syracuse	9
Boston College	3
Southern California	10
Lower round 1
Duke	15
Colorado State College	3
Western Michigan	8
Texas	2

Upper final
Oklahoma State	2
Southern California	4
Lower round 2
Boston College	4^{10}
Duke	3
Syracuse	6
Western Michigan	0

Semifinals
Oklahoma State	8
Syracuse	0
Southern California	4
Boston College	3

Final
Oklahoma State	0
Southern California	1

==== Game results ====
Date	Game	Winner	Score	Loser	Notes
June 9	Game 1	Oklahoma State	3–2	Duke	
June 10	Game 2	Syracuse	12–5	Colorado State College	
June 10	Game 3	Boston College	3–2	Western Michigan	
June 10	Game 4	Southern California	8–6	Texas	
June 11	Game 5	Duke	15–3	Colorado State College	Colorado State College eliminated
June 11	Game 6	Western Michigan	8–2	Texas	Texas eliminated
June 11	Game 7	Oklahoma State	12–9	Syracuse	
June 11	Game 8	Southern California	10–3	Boston College	
June 12	Game 9	Boston College	4–3 (10 innings)	Duke	Duke eliminated
June 12	Game 10	Syracuse	6–0	Western Michigan	Western Michigan eliminated
June 12	Game 11	Southern California	4–2	Oklahoma State	
June 13	Game 12	Oklahoma State	8–0	Syracuse	Syracuse eliminated
June 13	Game 13	Southern California	4–3	Boston College	Boston College eliminated
June 14	Final	Southern California	1–0	Oklahoma State	Southern California wins CWS

=== All-Tournament Team ===
The following players were members of the All-Tournament Team.

Position	Player	School
P	Littleton Fowler (MOP)	Oklahoma State
P	Larry Hankhammer	USC
P	Jim Withers	USC
C	Larry Himes	USC
1B	William Ryan	USC
2B	Bruce Andrew	Oklahoma State
3B	Dave Sarette	Syracuse
SS	Don Wallace	Oklahoma State
OF	Ron Davis	Duke
OF	Art Ersepke	USC
OF	Bill Tomb	Western Michigan

=== Notable players ===
- Boston College:
- Duke: Ron Davis
- Colorado State College:
- Oklahoma State: Don Wallace
- Southern California: Dan Ardell, Mike Gillespie, Marcel Lachemann, Tom Satriano, Ron Stillwell, Wally Wolf
- Syracuse: Bill Connors, Dave Giusti
- Texas: Bill Bethea
- Western Michigan: Roger Theder, Frank Quilici

== See also ==
- 1961 NAIA World Series
