= 1949 NCAA baseball season =

Baseball season

Tournament
- Duration: June 15–25, 1949

College World Series
- Duration: June 22–25, 1949
- Champions: Texas (1st title)
- Runners-up: Wake Forest (1st CWS Appearance)
- Winning coach: Bibb Falk (1st title)
- MOP: Tom Hamilton (Texas)

Seasons
- ← 1948 1950 →

The 1949 NCAA baseball season, play of college baseball in the United States organized by the National Collegiate Athletic Association (NCAA) began in the spring of 1949. The season progressed through the regular season and concluded with the 1949 NCAA baseball tournament and 1949 College World Series. The College World Series, held for the third time in 1949, consisted of four remaining teams in the NCAA Tournament and was held in Wichita, Kansas, at Wichita Municipal Stadium as a double-elimination tournament. Texas claimed the championship by sweeping the four team tournament.

== Conference winners ==
This is a partial list of conference champions from the 1949 season. Each of the eight geographical districts chose, by various methods, the team that would represent them in the NCAA Tournament. Conference champions had to be chosen, unless all conference champions declined the bid.

Conference	Regular season winner	Conference tournament	Tournament city	Tournament winner
Big Seven	Kansas	No conference tournament		
CIBA	Southern California	No conference tournament		
EIBL	Princeton	No conference tournament		
Mid-American Conference	Western Michigan	No conference tournament		
Missouri Valley Conference	Oklahoma A&M	1949 Missouri Valley Conference baseball tournament		Oklahoma A&M
Pacific Coast Conference North	Washington State	No conference tournament		
Southeastern Conference	Mississippi State	No conference tournament		
Southern Conference	Wake Forest	No conference tournament		
Southwest Conference	Texas	No conference tournament		
Yankee Conference	Rhode Island	No conference tournament		

== Conference standings ==
The following is an incomplete list of conference standings:

1949 Eastern Intercollegiate Baseball League baseball standings
	Conf.						Overall
Team	W		L		T	PCT	W		L		T	PCT
Princeton ‍†‍‍	6	–	3	–	0	.667	12	–	7	–	1	.625
Cornell ‍‍‍	5	–	3	–	0	.625	10	–	11	–	1	.477
Penn ‍‍‍	5	–	3	–	0	.625	10	–	8	–	1	.553
Dartmouth ‍‍‍	5	–	4	–	0	.556	12	–	10	–	0	.545
Harvard ‍‍‍	5	–	4	–	0	.556	10	–	12	–	0	.455
Brown ‍‍‍	4	–	4	–	0	.500	9	–	8	–	1	.528
Columbia ‍‍‍	4	–	5	–	0	.444	7	–	8	–	0	.467
Yale ‍‍‍	4	–	5	–	0	.444	13	–	12	–	3	.518
Navy ‍‍‍	3	–	4	–	0	.429	12	–	6	–	1	.658
Army ‍‍‍	1	–	7	–	0	.125	6	–	13	–	0	.316
† – Conference champion

1949 Southern Conference baseball standings
	Conf.				Overall
Team	W		L	PCT	W		L	PCT
Wake Forest ‍†‍‍^{y}	13	–	1	.929	31	–	4	.886
South Carolina ‍‍‍	13	–	5	.722	15	–	6	.714
Richmond ‍‍‍	7	–	3	.700	12	–	9	.571
Clemson ‍‍‍	10	–	5	.667	11	–	12	.478
North Carolina ‍‍‍	12	–	8	.600	20	–	9	.690
Maryland ‍‍‍	5	–	4	.556	10	–	8	.556
William & Mary ‍‍‍	6	–	5	.545		–		–
VMI ‍‍‍	5	–	5	.500		–		–
NC State ‍‍‍	8	–	11	.421		–		–
Virginia Tech ‍‍‍	5	–	7	.417	10	–	11	.476
Duke ‍‍‍	9	–	13	.409		–		–
Furman ‍‍‍	5	–	8	.385		–		–
George Washington ‍‍‍	2	–	5	.286		–		–
Davidson ‍‍‍	3	–	8	.273		–		–
Washington and Lee ‍‍‍	2	–	8	.200		–		–
The Citadel ‍‍‍	1	–	10	.091		–		–
† – Conference champion y – Invited to the NCAA tournament As of June 30, 1949; Rankings from Collegiate Baseball

1949 Southwest Conference baseball standings
	Conf.				Overall
Team	W		L	PCT	W		L	PCT
Texas ‍†‍‍^{y}	12	–	3	.800	23	–	7	.767
Texas A&M ‍‍‍	10	–	4	.714	17	–	8	.680
Baylor ‍‍‍	9	–	6	.600	17	–	12	.586
SMU ‍‍‍	6	–	9	.400	8	–	12	.400
TCU ‍‍‍	4	–	11	.267	6	–	14	.300
Rice ‍‍‍	3	–	11	.214	4	–	14	.222
† – Conference champion y – Invited to the NCAA tournament As of June 30, 1949; Rankings from Collegiate Baseball

1949 Pacific Coast Conference baseball standings
	Conf.				Overall
Team	W		L	PCT	W		L	PCT
North Division
Washington State ‍†‍‍	12	–	4	.750	33	–	9	.786
Oregon ‍‍‍	10	–	4	.714	18	–	7	.720
Oregon State ‍‍‍	8	–	7	.533	15	–	8	.652
Washington ‍‍‍	6	–	9	.400	6	–	9	.400
Idaho ‍‍‍	2	–	14	.125	4	–	22	.154
California Intercollegiate Baseball Association
USC ‍†‍‍^{y}	12	–	2	.857	23	–	6	.793
Santa Clara ‍‍‍	9	–	6	.600	17	–	10	.630
UCLA ‍‍‍	8	–	6	.571	21	–	15	.583
Stanford ‍‍‍	7	–	8	.467	18	–	12	.600
California ‍‍‍	5	–	10	.333	31	–	17	.646
St. Mary's ‍‍‍	3	–	12	.200	0	–	0	–
† – Conference champion y – Invited to the NCAA tournament

== NCAA tournament ==
The 1949 season marked the third NCAA Baseball Tournament, which consisted of eight teams divided into four regions. Each region held a three-game series to determine the four teams that advance to the College World Series, which was held in Wichita, Kansas. The four teams played a double-elimination format, with Texas sweeping the tournament and defeating Wake Forest in the final.

First Round
Wake Forest	2
Southern California	1
Texas	7
St. John's	1
Lower round 1
Southern California	12
St. John's	4

Semi-Finals
Wake Forest	1
Texas	8
Lower final
Wake Forest	2^{12}
Southern California	1

Finals
Texas	10	—
Wake Forest	3	—
