= 1949 NCAA baseball tournament =

American college sports championship

1949 NCAA I baseball tournament
- Season: 1949
- Teams: 8
- Finals site: Lawrence–Dumont Stadium; Wichita, KS
- Champions: Texas (1st title)
- Runner-up: Wake Forest (1st CWS Appearance)
- Winning coach: Bibb Falk (1st title)
- MOP: Tom Hamilton (Texas)

The 1949 NCAA baseball tournament was the third NCAA-sanctioned baseball tournament that determined a national champion. The tournament was held as the conclusion of the 1949 NCAA baseball season. The College World Series was played at Wichita Municipal Stadium in Wichita, Kansas from June 22 to June 25. The third tournament's champion was the Texas Longhorns, coached by Bibb Falk. The Most Outstanding Player was named for the first time, with the inaugural award going to Tom Hamilton of Texas. This was the first of six championships for the Longhorns through the 2023 season.

== Tournament ==
The tournament was divided into four regional brackets, Region A, Region B, Region C and Region D, with each region consisting of two teams playing a best-of-three-game series. The winner of each bracket advanced to the College World Series. This was the first and only year of this format.

=== Field ===
As in previous years, each representative of the eight districts were determined by a mix of selection committees, conference champions, and district playoffs.

School	Conference	Record (Conference)	Berth	Previous NCAA Appearances
Boston College	Independent		District I Selection	None
Colorado State College (Note: Colorado State College is currently known as the University of Northern Colorado. Not to be confused with Colorado State University, then known as Colorado A&M.)	RMC		District VII Selection	1; 1948
Notre Dame	Independent		Won District IV Playoff	None
Oklahoma A&M	MVC		Won District V playoff	1; 1948
Southern California	CIBA	20–3 (12–2)	District VIII Selection (Won PCC)	1; 1948
St. John's	MNYC	19–4	Won District II Playoff	None
Texas	SWC	18–7 (12–3)	District VI Selection (Won SWC)	1; 1947
Wake Forest	Southern	27–2 (13–1)	Won District III Playoff	None

=== Region A ===
At Brooklyn, New York June 13

Region A Playoff
St. John's	10	7	—
Boston College	5	2	—

=== Region B ===
At South Bend, Indiana June 17–18

Region B Playoff
Wake Forest	4	10	—
Notre Dame	1	7	—

=== Region C ===
At Austin, Texas June 16–17

Region C Playoff
Texas	7	3	—
Oklahoma A&M	3	2	—

=== Region D ===
At Los Angeles, California June 16–17

Region D Playoff
Southern California	12	2	8
Colorado State College	2	6	7

== College World Series ==
Following financial losses in Kalamazoo, Michigan the previous year, the NCAA moved the tournament to Wichita for the 1949 edition. This would be the only year in Wichita, as the 1950 edition would take place in Omaha, Nebraska, as it has been every year since and will be through 2036.

=== Participants ===
School	Conference	Record (Conference)	Head coach	CWS appearances	CWS Best finish	CWS record
St. John's	MNYC	21–4 (9–1)	Frank McGuire	0 (last: none)	none	0–0
Southern California	CIBA	22–4 (12–2)	Sam Barry	1 (last: 1948)	1st (1948)	2–1
Texas	SWC	20–7 (12–3)	Bibb Falk	0 (last: none)	none	0–0
Wake Forest	Southern	29–2 (13–1)	Taylor Sanford	0 (last: none)	none	0–0

=== Results ===
==== Bracket ====
First Round
Wake Forest	2
Southern California	1
Texas	7
St. John's	1
Lower round 1
Southern California	12
St. John's	4

Semi-Finals
Wake Forest	1
Texas	8
Lower final
Wake Forest	2^{12}
Southern California	1

Finals
Texas	10	—
Wake Forest	3	—

==== Game results ====
Date	Game	Winner	Score	Loser	Notes
June 22	Game 1	Wake Forest	2–1	USC	
June 22	Game 2	Texas	7–1	St. John's	
June 23	Game 3	Texas	8–1	Wake Forest	
June 23	Game 4	USC	12–4	St. John's	St. John's eliminated
June 24	Game 5	Wake Forest	2–1^{12}	USC	Southern California eliminated
June 25	Final	Texas	10–3	Wake Forest	Texas wins CWS

=== Notable players ===
- Southern California: Jim Brideweser, Rudy Regalado
- St. John's: Jack Kaiser
- Texas: Charlie Gorin, Tom Hamilton, Murray Wall
- Wake Forest: Charlie Teague
