= 1961 Syracuse Orangemen baseball team =

American college baseball season

1961 Syracuse Orangemen baseball

District II champions

College World Series, 4th
- Conference: Independent
- CB: No. 4
- Record: 18–5
- Head coach: Ted Kleinhans (15th season)
- Home stadium: Lew Carr Field

The 1961 Syracuse Orangemen baseball team represented Syracuse University in the 1961 NCAA University Division baseball season. The Orangemen played their home games at Lew Carr Field. The team was coached by Ted Kleinhans in his 15th year as head coach at Syracuse.

The Orangemen won the District II Playoff to advance to the College World Series, where they were defeated by the Oklahoma State Cowboys.

== Roster ==
1961 Syracuse Orangemen baseball team
Players
Coaches

#	Pos.	Name	B/T	Height	Weight	Year	Home town
	RHP	Bill Canon	/R	—	—	So
	RHP	Billy Connors	R/R	6 ft 220 in (7.42 m)	—	So	Schenectady, New York
	RHP	Larry Craybas	/R	—	—	So
	OF	Pete DeSilvia	/	—	210 lb (95 kg)	So	Syracuse, New York
	LHP	Sloane Dugan	/L	—	—	Jr
	OF	Dick Easterly	/	—	—	Sr
	RHP	Dave Giusti	R/R	5 ft 11 in (1.8 m)	190 lb (86 kg)	Sr	North Syracuse, New York
	INF	John Howell	/	—	—	Sr
	C	Bob Jacuk	/	—	—	So
	OF	Bob Lelli	/L	—	—	So
	INF	Peter Palumb	/	—	—	So
	INF	Dave Sarette	/	—	—	Sr
		Dick Taylor	/	—	—	So
	C	Dale White	/	—	—	Jr
	RHP	Jeff Williams	/R	—	—	Sr
	INF	Bucky Winters	/	—	—	Jr

Head coach

Ted Kleinhans

Assistant coach(es)

Legend

- (C) Team captain
- (S) Suspended
- (I) Ineligible
- Injured
- Current redshirt

Roster
Last update: January 11, 2022

== Schedule ==
1961 Syracuse Orangemen baseball game log
Regular season
March (1–0)

#	Date	Opponent	Site/stadium	Score	Overall record
1	March 30	at Gettysburg	Unknown • Gettysburg, Pennsylvania	11–3	1–0

April (3–2)

#	Date	Opponent	Site/stadium	Score	Overall record
2	April 1	at Navy	Unknown • Annapolis, Maryland	3–7	1–1
3	April 3	at Loyola (MD)	Unknown • Baltimore, Maryland	15–5	2–1
4	April 4	at Maryland	Shipley Field • College Park, Maryland	6–2	3–1
5	April 28	at Army	Doubleday Field • West Point, New York	7–2	4–1
6	April 29	at Lafayette	Fisher Field • Easton, Pennsylvania	7–2	4–2

May (10–1)

#	Date	Opponent	Site/stadium	Score	Overall record
7	May 2	Cornell	Lew Carr Field • Syracuse, New York	12–2	5–2
8	May 4	Hobart	Lew Carr Field • Syracuse, New York	4–0	6–2
9	May 5	RPI	Lew Carr Field • Syracuse, New York	6–1	7–2
10	May 6	Colgate	Unknown • Unknown	13–7	8–2
11	May 8	at Clarkson	Unknown • Potsdam, New York	15–12	9–2
12	May 9	at St. Lawrence	Unknown • Canton, New York	1–2	9–3
13	May 12	Bucknell	Lew Carr Field • Syracuse, New York	21–0	10–3
14	May 13	Penn State	Lew Carr Field • Syracuse, New York	10–0	11–3
15	May 13	Penn State	Lew Carr Field • Syracuse, New York	3–2	12–3
16	May 17	at Cornell	Hoy Field • Ithaca, New York	–	13–3
17	May 18	Rochester	Lew Carr Field • Syracuse, New York	–	14–3

Postseason
NCAA District II Playoff (2–0)

#	Date	Opponent	Site/stadium	Score	Overall record
18	vs June 3	Delaware	Lew Carr Field • Syracuse, New York	2–0	15–3
19	vs June 7	St. Johns	Lew Carr Field • Syracuse, New York	9–3	16–3

College World Series (2–2)

#	Date	Opponent	Site/stadium	Score	Overall record
20	June 10	vs Colorado State College	Omaha Municipal Stadium • Omaha, Nebraska	12–5	17–3
21	June 11	vs Oklahoma State	Omaha Municipal Stadium • Omaha, Nebraska	9–12	17–4
22	June 12	vs Western Michigan	Omaha Municipal Stadium • Omaha, Nebraska	6–0	18–4
23	June 13	vs Oklahoma State	Omaha Municipal Stadium • Omaha, Nebraska	0–8	18–5

== Awards and honors ==
Dave Sarette

- College World Series All-Tournament Team
