= 1949 St. John's Redmen baseball team =

American college baseball season

1949 St. John's Redmen baseball

Region A champions

College World Series, 4th
- Conference: Metropolitan New York Conference
- Record: 21–6 (9–1 Metro)
- Head coach: Frank McGuire (2nd season)
- Captain: Jack Kaiser
- Home stadium: Dexter Park

The 1949 St. John's Redmen baseball team represented the St. John's University in the 1949 NCAA baseball season. The Redmen played their home games at Dexter Park. The team was coached by Frank McGuire in his St. John's University in his 2nd year at St. John's.

The Redmen won the Region A to advance to the College World Series, where they were defeated by the Southern California Trojans.

== Roster ==
1949 St. John's Redmen baseball team
Players
Coaches

#	Pos.	Name	B/T	Height	Weight	Year	Home town
	INF	Dick Bohner	/	—	—
	RHP	Gerry Brown	/R	—	—	Jr
	INF	Lou Carnesecca	/	—	—
		Don Doyle	/	—	—
		Jim Felton	/	—	—
	OF	Tony Garin	/	—	—	So
	C	Jack Gimmler	/	—	—
		John Gordon	/	—	—
	INF	Don Hogan	/	—	—	Sr
	OF	Jack Kaiser (C)	/	—	—	Sr
		Bill Lynch	/	—	—
		Don MacKenzie	/	—	—
	C	Irv Miller	/	—	—	Sr
	RHP	Dom Novak	/R	—	—	Jr
	INF	Herb Rossman	R/	6 ft 0 in (1.83 m)	185 lb (84 kg)		Brooklyn, New York
		Rex Shannahan	/	—	—
		Bob Sullivan	/	—	—
		Lou Tambini	/	—	—
		Tom Tolan	/	—	—	Sr
	INF	Art West	/	—	—

Head coach

Frank McGuire

Assistant coach(es)

Legend

- (C) Team captain
- (S) Suspended
- (I) Ineligible
- Injured
- Current redshirt

== Schedule ==
Legend
St. John's win
St. John's loss

1949 St. John's Redmen baseball game log
Regular season (16–3)

Date	Opponent	Site/stadium	Score	Overall record	MNYC Record
April 7	Pratt	Dexter Park • Queens, NY	W 7–0	1–0	0–0
April 9	CCNY	Dexter Park • New York, New York	L 5–7	1–1	1–0
Unknown	vs Saint Peter's		L 2–5	1–2	1–0
April 13	at Hofstra	Hempstead, NY	W 8–7	2–2	1–0
	vs Georgetown		W 9–3	3–2	1–0
	vs Wagner		W 6–2	4–2	1–0
	vs Kings Point		W 6–3	5–2	1–0
	vs NYU		W 7–6	6–2	2–0
	vs West Point		W 6–3	7–2	2–0
	vs Fordham		W 10–9	8–2	3–0
	vs Brooklyn		W 10–4	9–2	4–0
	vs NYU		W 4–3	10–2	5–0
	vs Manhattan		L 0–2	10–3	5–1
	vs Hofstra		W 3–0	11–3	5–1
	vs Kings Point		W 17–2	12–3	5–1
	vs Fordham		W 2–1	13–3	6–1
	vs Manhattan		W 8–2	14–3	7–1
	vs CCNY		W 7–6	15–3	8–1
	vs Brooklyn		W 19–6	16–3	9–1

Postseason

NCAA District II Playoff (3–1)
Date	Opponent	Site/stadium	Score	Overall record	Playoff record
June 6	Rutgers	Dexter Park • New York, New York	W 12–8	17–3	9–1
June 7	Penn State	Dexter Park • New York, New York	W 3–0	18–3	9–1
June 8	Penn State	Dexter Park • New York, New York	L 4–11	18–4	9–1
June 8	Penn State	Dexter Park • New York, New York	W 7–5	19–4	9–1

NCAA Region A (2–0)
Date	Opponent	Site/stadium	Score	Overall record	Regional Record
June 13	Boston College	Dexter Park • New York, New York	W 10–5	20–4	9–1
June 13	Boston College	Dexter Park • New York, New York	W 7–2	21–4	9–1

College World Series (0–2)
Date	Opponent	Site/stadium	Score	Overall record	CWS record
June 22	vs Texas	Lawrence Stadium • Wichita, Kansas	L 1–7	21–5	9–1
June 23	vs Southern California	Lawrence Stadium • Wichita, Kansas	L 4–12	21–6	9–1
