= 1949 Wake Forest Demon Deacons baseball team =

American college baseball season

1949 Wake Forest Demon Deacons baseball

SoCon champion District III champion Region B champion

College World Series, 2nd
- Conference: Southern Conference
- Record: 31–4 (13–1 SoCon)
- Head coach: Lee Gooch (2nd season)

1949 Southern Conference baseball standings
	Conf.				Overall
Team	W		L	PCT	W		L	PCT
Wake Forest ‍†‍‍^{y}	13	–	1	.929	31	–	4	.886
South Carolina ‍‍‍	13	–	5	.722	15	–	6	.714
Richmond ‍‍‍	7	–	3	.700	12	–	9	.571
Clemson ‍‍‍	10	–	5	.667	11	–	12	.478
North Carolina ‍‍‍	12	–	8	.600	20	–	9	.690
Maryland ‍‍‍	5	–	4	.556	10	–	8	.556
William & Mary ‍‍‍	6	–	5	.545		–		–
VMI ‍‍‍	5	–	5	.500		–		–
NC State ‍‍‍	8	–	11	.421		–		–
Virginia Tech ‍‍‍	5	–	7	.417	10	–	11	.476
Duke ‍‍‍	9	–	13	.409		–		–
Furman ‍‍‍	5	–	8	.385		–		–
George Washington ‍‍‍	2	–	5	.286		–		–
Davidson ‍‍‍	3	–	8	.273		–		–
Washington and Lee ‍‍‍	2	–	8	.200		–		–
The Citadel ‍‍‍	1	–	10	.091		–		–
† – Conference champion y – Invited to the NCAA tournament As of June 30, 1949; Rankings from Collegiate Baseball

The 1949 Wake Forest Demon Deacons baseball team represented Wake Forest College in the 1949 NCAA baseball season. The team was coached by Lee Gooch in his second season as head coach at Wake Forest.

The Demon Deacons reached the College World Series, finishing as the runner up to Texas.

== Roster ==
1949 Wake Forest Demon Deacons roster
Pitchers: - Moe Bauer; - Max Eller; - Lloyd Griffin; - Charlie Kinlaw; - Dick McCleney; - Vernon Mustian; - Harry Nicholas; - Frank Thorne; - Richard Vander Clute	Infielders: - Art Hoch; - Gene Hooks; - E. K. Rogers; - Charlie Teague; - Wiley Warren; Catchers: - Russ Batchelor; - Alton Brooks; - Woodrow Wren	Outfielders: - Charlie Darden; - Joe Fulgham; - Paul Harris; - Charlie Kersh; - Paul Livick; - Victor Matney

== Schedule ==
Legend
Wake Forest win
Wake Forest loss

1949 Wake Forest Demon Deacons baseball game log
Regular season

Date	Opponent	Site/stadium	Score	Overall record	SoCon Record
	Randolph–Macon*		W 14–1	1–0	
	Washington and Lee		W 6–4	2–0	1–0
	Cornell*		W 11–5	3–0	
	Cornell*		W 7–3	4–0	
	Lumberton*		W 3–0	5–0	
	Lumberton*		W 13–3	6–0	
	Burlington*		W 13–10	7–0	
	Duke		W 6–3	8–0	2–0
	Fayetteville*		W 2–0	9–0	
	Lumberton*		W 17–0	10–0	
	Greenville*		W 12–3	11–0	
	NC State		W 3–1	12–0	3–0
	Greensboro*		W 4–2	13–0	
	North Carolina		W 6–5	14–0	4–0
	Duke		W 6–5	15–0	5–0
	NC State		W 1–0	16–0	6–0
	Duke		W 3–1	17–0	7–0
	NC State		W 9–2	18–0	8–0
	McCrary Eagles*		W 8–1	19–0	
	North Carolina		W 4–2	20–0	9–0
	Whiteville*		L 0–1	20–1	
	Duke		W 13–1	21–1	10–0
	NC State		L 5–7	21–2	10–1
	North Carolina		W 3–2	22–2	11–1
	North Carolina		W 2–0	23–2	12–1
	NC State		W 6–4	24–2	13–1

Post-season

Date	Opponent	Site/stadium	Score
	Belmont's Combers		W 14–6
	Henderson Independents		W 11–4
	McCrary Eagles		W 7–2
	Rocky Mount		W 12–1
	Plymouth		W 3–0
	Edenton		W 3–2
	Henderson Independents		W 13–2
	Superior Mills		L 2–3
	Highland Park		L 2–3

District III playoffs
Date	Opponent	Site/stadium	Score	Overall record	Playoff record
	Kentucky	Charlotte, NC	W 5–3	25–2	1–0
	Mississippi State	Charlotte, NC	W 4–3	26–2	2–0
	Kentucky	Charlotte, NC	W 8–0	27–2	3–0

NCAA Region B
Date	Opponent	Site/stadium	Score	Overall record	Regional Record
June 17	at Notre Dame	South Bend, IN	W 4–1	28–2	1–0
June 18	at Notre Dame	South Bend, IN	W 10–7	29–2	2–0

College World Series
Date	Opponent	Site/stadium	Score	Overall record	CWS record
June 22	Southern California	Lawrence–Dumont Stadium • Wichita, KS	W 2–1	30–2	1–0
June 23	Texas	Lawrence–Dumont Stadium • Wichita, KS	L 1–8	30–3	1–1
June 24	Southern California	Lawrence–Dumont Stadium • Wichita, KS	W 2–1	31–3	2–1
June 25	Texas	Lawrence–Dumont Stadium • Wichita, KS	L 3–10	31–4	2–2
