= 1961 Western Michigan Broncos baseball team =

College baseball team

1961 Western Michigan Broncos baseball

Mid-American Conference champions District IV champions

College World Series, T-5th
- Conference: Mid-American Conference
- Record: 19–8 (11–0 MAC)
- Head coach: Charlie Maher (23rd season)
- Assistant coach: Bill Chambers (1st season)
- Home stadium: Hyames Field

1961 Mid-American Conference baseball standings
	Conf.						Overall
Team	W		L		T	PCT	W		L		T	PCT
No. 5 Western Michigan ‍†‍‍^{y}	11	–	0	–	0	1.000	19	–	8	–	0	.704
Kent State ‍‍‍	9	–	2	–	0	.818	12	–	7	–	0	.632
Ohio ‍‍‍	7	–	3	–	0	.700	13	–	6	–	0	.684
Miami (OH) ‍‍‍	3	–	6	–	0	.333	5	–	11	–	1	.324
Bowling Green ‍‍‍	2	–	7	–	0	.222	6	–	12	–	1	.342
Marshall ‍‍‍	2	–	8	–	0	.200	8	–	12	–	1	.405
Toledo ‍‍‍	1	–	9	–	0	.100	2	–	16	–	0	.111
† – Conference champion y – Invited to the NCAA tournament As of June 30, 1961; Rankings from Collegiate Baseball

The 1961 Western Michigan Broncos baseball team represented Western Michigan College in the 1961 NCAA University Division baseball season. The Broncos played their home games at Hyames Field. The team was coached by Charlie Maher in his 23rd year at Western Michigan.

The Broncos won the District IV playoff to advance to the College World Series, where they were defeated by the Syracuse Orangemen.

== Roster ==
1961 Western Michigan Broncos baseball team
Players
Coaches

#	Pos.	Name	B/T	Height	Weight	Year	Home town
	C	Jerry Austry	/	—	—	So	Chicago, Illinois
		Pat Bidelman	/	—	—
		Les Cochran	/	—	—
		Gene Cooley	/	—	—
		John Cruse	/	—	—
	C	Charles Dodge	/	—	—
		Bill Donahue	/	—	—
		Al Erickson	/	—	—
	OF	Mike Gatza	/	—	—	So
		Bob Hamet	/	—	—
	INF	Bill Ihne	/	—	—
		Ray Larned	/	—	—
	P	Ken Larsen	/	—	—
	INF	Fred Michalski	/	—	—	So
	LHP	Bill Ortlieb	/L	—	—	Jr
		Ken Palmateer	/	—	—
	INF	Frank Quilici	/	—	—	Sr
	LHP	Lee Salo	/L	6 ft 5 in (1.96 m)	—
		Ken Scodeller	/	—	—
		Gary Seamon	/	—	—
		Paul Tagliola	/	—	—
		Roger Theder	/	—	—	So
		Bill Tomb	/	—	—
	LHP	Gary Wallman	/L	—	—	Sr

Head coach

Charlie Maher

Assistant coach(es)

Bill Chambers

Legend

- (C) Team captain
- (S) Suspended
- (I) Ineligible
- Injured
- Current redshirt

== Schedule ==
1961 Western Michigan Broncos baseball game log
Regular season
April (7–3)

#	Date	Opponent	Site/stadium	Score	Overall record	MAC record
1	April 1	vs Duke	Seminole Field • Tallahassee, Florida	3–10	0–1	–
2	April 2	vs Florida	Seminole Field • Tallahassee, Florida	6–7	0–2	–
3	April 4	at Florida State	Seminole Field • Tallahassee, Florida	10–3	1–2	–
4	April 4	at Florida State	Seminole Field • Tallahassee, Florida	6–7	1–3	–
5	April 7	at Toledo	Unknown • Toledo, Ohio	14–2	2–3	1–0
6	April 8	at Toledo	Unknown • Toledo, Ohio	2–0	3–3	2–0
7	April 14	Miami (OH)	Hyames Field • Kalamazoo, Michigan	15–0	4–3	3–0
8	April 15	Miami (OH)	Hyames Field • Kalamazoo, Michigan	11–8	5–3	4–0
9	April 21	Kent State	Hyames Field • Kalamazoo, Michigan	4–1	6–3	5–0
10	April 29	at Notre Dame	Cartier Field • Notre Dame, Indiana	7–4	7–3	5–0

May (8–3)

#	Date	Opponent	Site/stadium	Score	Overall record	MAC record
11	May 2	Ohio State	Hyames Field • Kalamazoo, Michigan	10–6	8–3	5–0
12	May 2	Ohio State	Hyames Field • Kalamazoo, Michigan	2–3	8–4	5–0
13	May 5	Ohio	Hyames Field • Kalamazoo, Michigan	4–1	9–4	6–0
14	May 6	Ohio	Hyames Field • Kalamazoo, Michigan	2–1	10–4	7–0
15	May 12	at Marshall	Unknown • Huntington, West Virginia	13–4	11–4	8–0
16	May 13	at Marshall	Unknown • Huntington, West Virginia	12–3	12–4	9–0
17	May 15	Wisconsin	Hyames Field • Kalamazoo, Michigan	8–10	12–5	9–0
18	May 16	Wisconsin	Hyames Field • Kalamazoo, Michigan	1–3	12–6	9–0
19	May 19	at Bowling Green	Unknown • Bowling Green, Ohio	14–3	13–6	10–0
20	May 20	at Bowling Green	Unknown • Bowling Green, Ohio	9–1	14–6	11–0
21	May 23	Michigan	Hyames Field • Kalamazoo, Michigan	7–5	15–6	11–0

Postseason
District IV Playoff (3–0)

#	Date	Opponent	Site/stadium	Score	Overall record	MAC record
22	May 29	vs Detroit	Ray Fisher Stadium • Ann Arbor, Michigan	3–1	16–6	11–0
23	May 31	vs Cincinnati	Ray Fisher Stadium • Ann Arbor, Michigan	8–1	17–6	11–0
24	June 3	at Michigan	Ray Fisher Stadium • Ann Arbor, Michigan	4–3	18–6	11–0

College World Series (1–2)

#	Date	Opponent	Site/stadium	Score	Overall record	MAC record
25	June 10	vs Boston College	Omaha Municipal Stadium • Omaha, Nebraska	2–3	18–7	11–0
26	June 11	vs Texas	Omaha Municipal Stadium • Omaha, Nebraska	8–2	19–7	11–0
27	June 12	vs Syracuse	Omaha Municipal Stadium • Omaha, Nebraska	0–6	19–8	11–0

== Awards and honors ==
Charles Dodge

- First Team All-MAC

Mike Gatza

- Second Team All-MAC

Bill Ihne

- First Team All-MAC

Ken Larsen

- Second Team All-MAC

Bill Ortlieb

- First Team All-MAC

Frank Quilici

- First Team All-MAC
- First Team All-American
