= Bibb Falk =

American baseball player and coach (1899–1989)

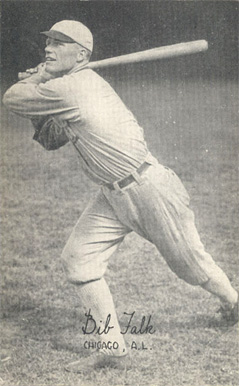
- Left fielder
- Born: January 27, 1899; Austin, Texas, U.S.
- Died: June 8, 1989 (aged 90); Austin, Texas, U.S.
- Batted: Left Threw: Left

MLB debut
- July 17, 1920, for the Chicago White Sox

Last MLB appearance
- September 23, 1931, for the Cleveland Indians

MLB statistics
- Batting average: .314
- Home runs: 69
- Runs batted in: 784
- Stats at Baseball Reference

Teams
- As player: Chicago White Sox (1920–1928); Cleveland Indians (1929–1931); As coach: Cleveland Indians (1933); Boston Red Sox (1934)
Coaching career
Coaching career (HC unless noted)
Baseball
1940–1942	Texas
1946–1967	Texas
Head coaching record
Overall	434–152–10
Accomplishments and honors
Championships
2x College World Series (1949, 1950); 20x SWC Regular season Champion (1940, 1941, 1946–1954, 1957, 1958, 1960–1963, 1965, 1966, 1967)
College Baseball Hall of Fame; Inducted in 2007

Bibb August Falk (January 27, 1899 – June 8, 1989) was an American left fielder in Major League Baseball who played for the Chicago White Sox (1920–28) and Cleveland Indians (1929–31).

Born in Austin, Texas, Falk played football and baseball at the University of Texas before signing with the White Sox in 1920. He was a spare outfielder with the Sox until news of the 1919 Black Sox scandal broke and eight players were suspended; Falk replaced Shoeless Joe Jackson in left field. Falk was a consistent hitter, ending his career after twelve seasons with a .314 career batting average. He was also known as a heady player whose merciless riding of opponents earned him the nickname "Jockey." His best season was in 1926 with the White Sox; he had a .345 batting average, 43 doubles, and 108 runs batted in, and finished 12th in the MVP voting that year. After the 1928 season, he was traded to the Cleveland Indians for Chick Autry, and played three more seasons in the major leagues before retiring as a player and becoming a coach.

In 1353 games over 12 seasons, Falk posted a .314 batting average (1463-for-4652) with 655 runs, 300 doubles, 59 triples, 69 home runs, 784 RBI, 47 stolen bases, 412 bases on balls, .372 on-base percentage and .449 slugging percentage. He finished his career with a .967 fielding percentage playing at left and right field.

After Major League coaching stints with the Indians (1933) and Boston Red Sox (1934), Falk coached baseball at the University of Texas from 1940 to 1942, then again from 1946 to 1967, winning consecutive College World Series titles in 1949 and 1950. In 1975, the new Disch-Falk Field at the University of Texas was named in honor of Falk and his former coach, Billy Disch. He died at age 90 in Austin.

== Head coaching record ==
=== College baseball ===
The records shown below are only the collegiate record, not the overall record against not collegiate teams.

Record table
Season	Team	Overall	Conference	Standing	Postseason
Texas Longhorns (Southwest Conference) (1940–1942)
1940	Texas	15–4	14–1	1st	
1941	Texas	14–3	12–3	1st	
1942	Texas	11–4	9–4	2nd	
Texas Longhorns (Southwest Conference) (1946–1967)
1946	Texas	19–2	14–0	1st	
1947	Texas	19–2	14–1	1st	NCAA District tournament
1948	Texas	18–1	13–1	1st	
1949	Texas	22–4	12–3	1st	College World Series champions
1950	Texas	24–4	14–1	1st	College World Series champions
1951	Texas	15–4	11–4	T–1st	
1952	Texas	19–9	11–4	1st	College World Series
1953	Texas	24–7–1	12–3–1	T–1st	College World Series Runner–Up
1954	Texas	15–7–2	10–2–1	1st	NCAA District tournament
1955	Texas	10–13–1	7–8–1	T–3rd	
1956	Texas	5–13	3–11	6th	
1957	Texas	19–5	12–1	1st	College World Series
1958	Texas	18–7	13–2	1st	NCAA District tournament
1959	Texas	13–7	9–5	2nd	
1960	Texas	19–3	13–2	1st	NCAA District tournament
1961	Texas	20–5–2	11–3–2	1st	College World Series
1962	Texas	22–7	12–2	1st	College World Series
1963	Texas	21–7–1	12–3	T–1st	College World Series
1964	Texas	16–7–1	10–5–1	T–2nd	
1965	Texas	18–7	11–4	1st	College World Series
1966	Texas	21–9–2	9–6	T–1st	College World Series
1967	Texas	17–11	10–5	T–1st	NCAA District tournament
Texas:		434–152–10 (.737)	276–84–7 (.762)		
Total:		434–152–10 (.737)			
National champion Postseason invitational champion Conference regular season champion Conference regular season and conference tournament champion Division regular season champion Division regular season and conference tournament champion Conference tournament champion

== Managerial record ==
Team	Year	Regular season					Postseason			
Team	Year	Games	Won	Lost	Win %	Finish	Won	Lost	Win %	Result
CLE	1933	1	1	0	1.000	interim	–	–	–	–
Total		1	1	0	1.000		0	0	–	
