= Littleton Fowler =

Littleton Fowler may refer to:

- Littleton Fowler (minister) (1803–1847), American Methodist minister
- Littleton Fowler (baseball) (born 1941), American baseball pitcher
