= 1961 Oklahoma State Cowboys baseball team =

Oklahoma State Cowboys season

1961 Oklahoma State Cowboys baseball

Big 8 champion District 5 champion

College World Series, 2nd
- Conference: Big Eight Conference
- CB: No. 2
- Record: 27–3 (18–1 Big 8)
- Head coach: Toby Greene (18th year)

1961 Big Eight Conference baseball standings
	Conf.				Overall
Team	W		L	PCT	W		L	PCT
No. 2 Oklahoma State ‍†‍‍^{y}	18	–	1	.947	27	–	3	.900
Missouri ‍‍‍	13	–	6	.684	16	–	7	.696
Colorado ‍‍‍	9	–	8	.529	21	–	11	.656
Kansas State ‍‍‍	10	–	10	.500	10	–	12	.455
Oklahoma ‍‍‍	9	–	10	.474	10	–	15	.400
Nebraska ‍‍‍	7	–	11	.389	9	–	14	.391
Iowa State ‍‍‍	3	–	13	.188	5	–	14	.263
Kansas ‍‍‍	2	–	12	.143	5	–	14	.263
† – Conference champion y – Invited to the NCAA tournament As of June 30, 1961; Rankings from Collegiate Baseball

The 1961 Oklahoma State Cowboys baseball team represented Oklahoma State University–Stillwater in the 1961 NCAA University Division baseball season. The Cowboys played their home games at Allie P. Reynolds Stadium in Stillwater, Oklahoma. The team was coached by Toby Greene in his eighteenth season at Oklahoma State.

The Cowboys reached the College World Series, finishing as the runner up to Southern California.

== Roster ==
1961 Oklahoma State Cowboys roster
- Larry Ferguson; - Robert Hennkens; - Gary Reid; - Don Strain	Pitchers: - Littleton Fowler; - Jim Wixson	Infielders: - Bruce Andrew; - Bill Ketchum; - Paul Grayson Mersh; - Don Wallace; Catchers: - Ray Bond	Outfielders: - Jim Dobson; - Don B. Karns; - Walt McKenzie; - Gentry Politte

== Schedule ==
Legend
Oklahoma State win
Oklahoma State loss

1961 Oklahoma State Cowboys baseball game log
Regular season

March
Date	Opponent	Site/stadium	Score	Overall record	Big 8 record
Mar 27	at Houston*	Buffalo Stadium • Houston, TX	W 2–0	1–0	
Mar 28	at Houston*	Buffalo Stadium • Houston, TX	W 7–4	2–0	
Mar 30	at Rice*	Houston, TX	W 13–5	3–0	
Mar 31	at Rice*	Houston, TX	W 11–5	4–0	

April
Date	Opponent	Site/stadium	Score	Overall record	Big 8 record
Apr 7	at Nebraska	Husker Diamond • Lincoln, NE	W 9–3	5–0	1–0
Apr 8	at Nebraska	Husker Diamond • Lincoln, NE	W 7–1	6–0	2–0
Apr 14	Kansas State	Stillwater, OK	W 8–2	7–0	3–0
Apr 14	Kansas State	Stillwater, OK	W 5–1	8–0	4–0
Apr 15	Kansas State	Stillwater, OK	W 10–0	9–0	5–0
Apr 21	at Oklahoma	Norman, OK	W 5–2	10–0	6–0
Apr 21	at Oklahoma	Norman, OK	W 7–0	11–0	7–0
Apr 22	at Oklahoma	Norman, OK	W 9–0	12–0	8–0
Apr 28	Kansas	Stillwater, OK	W 8–0	13–0	9–0
Apr 28	Kansas	Stillwater, OK	W 6–0	14–0	10–0
Apr 29	Kansas	Stillwater, OK	W 17–7	15–0	11–0

May
Date	Opponent	Site/stadium	Score	Overall record	Big 8 record
May 5	at Colorado	Boulder, CO	W 8–5	16–0	12–0
May 6	at Colorado	Boulder, CO	W 5–4	17–0	13–0
May 12	Iowa State	Stillwater, OK	W 12–1	18–0	14–0
May 12	Iowa State	Stillwater, OK	W 16–1	19–0	15–0
May 13	Iowa State	Stillwater, OK	W 10–2	20–0	16–0
May 19	Missouri	Stillwater, OK	W 2–1	21–0	17–0
May 19	Missouri	Stillwater, OK	L 1–7	21–1	17–1
May 20	Missouri	Stillwater, OK	W 3–2	22–1	18–1

Postseason

NCAA District 5 playoff
Date	Opponent	Site/stadium	Score	Overall record	NCAAT record
May 29	Iowa State Teachers	Stillwater, OK	W 10–0	23–1	1–0
May 29	Iowa State Teachers	Stillwater, OK	W 11–8	24–1	2–0

College World Series
Date	Opponent	Site/stadium	Score	Overall record	CWS record
June 9	Duke	Johnny Rosenblatt Stadium • Omaha, NE	W 3–2	25–1	1–0
June 11	Syracuse	Johnny Rosenblatt Stadium • Omaha, NE	W 12–9	26–1	2–0
June 12	Southern California	Johnny Rosenblatt Stadium • Omaha, NE	L 2–4	26–2	2–1
June 13	Syracuse	Johnny Rosenblatt Stadium • Omaha, NE	W 8–0	27–2	3–1
June 14	Southern California	Johnny Rosenblatt Stadium • Omaha, NE	L 1–0	27–3	3–2
