= List of terraces at baseball venues =

This is a list of baseball parks containing slopes in a portion of their outfield areas, which were sometimes or often known to affect the course of the game when a fly ball was hit toward that area.

Terraces were common in baseball in the early days, and were typically used to make up the difference in grade level between the edge of the outfield and a nearby street, which might vary from a few feet to a very significant slope. Many of these features were eventually covered when interior bleachers were built, but in some cases that was not possible, and the terrace remained for the life of the ballpark.

This feature is to be distinguished from the normal gradual "turtleback" grading that is or was sometimes done in baseball and football fields in order to facilitate drainage.

- Baker Bowl in Philadelphia.

Had a gradual rise in center field, necessitated by a railroad tunnel emanating from the station on the other side of Broad Street. For part of its early years, it also had an embankment in the right field corner, for a bicycle track that was installed for a while.

- The second Clark Field in Austin, Texas.

Home of the University of Texas from 1928 to 1974, also for minor league ball for a time. An actual cliff ran across a portion of the outfield, making the defensive play interesting.

- Crosley Field in Cincinnati.

Mostly across left field, fading away across center field. The most famous major league ballpark with a terrace. Like most terraces, its purpose was to make up the difference in grade level between the field and the streets. The outfield area was too small to cover with bleachers, and excavation to level the area was never undertaken. Unlike most other parks, no gravel warning track was installed, as the terrace was presumed to be sufficient warning.

- Daikin Park in Houston.

"Tal's Hill" in deep center field was constructed for purely decorative reasons, for purposeful eccentricity. It was leveled after the 2016 season when the park's main tenant, the Houston Astros, added a new center field seating area.

- Ebbets Field in Brooklyn.

Had a slight upslope in the left field corner when the park was first built, later covered by bleachers. That corner was the highest point on the block.

- Fenway Park in Boston.

The area along the Green Monster, Fenway's iconic left field wall, was originally a 45-degree slope, dubbed "Duffy's Cliff" for the Boston Red Sox outfielder who negotiated it adroitly. The area was able to be leveled out when the wall was rebuilt. The left field corner is roughly 8 or 10 feet below the grade of Lansdowne Street.

- Huntington Avenue Grounds in Boston.

Left and center fields had an incline at the base of the fence.

- Municipal Stadium in Kansas City, Missouri had a distinctive, large upslope in right field, where the street level was well above the field. When the stadium was upgraded for major league use, in inner fence was installed, but unlike Sulphur Dell, there was enough land area to keep the home run distance fair.
- Manhattan Field in Manhattan.

Had a significant earthworks along the entire north edge of its outfield area.

- Shibe Park in Philadelphia.

Had a slight upslope in deep center field, before an inner fence was constructed.

- Sulphur Dell in Nashville, Tennessee, Minor League Baseball.

The "mother of all terraces", a very large sloping area that surrounded the outfield.

- Wrigley Field in Chicago.

The left field corner area originally had an upslope. The corner of Addison and Clark Streets is the highest point on the city block on which the ballpark sits. The reconstruction of the bleachers over the winter of 2005–06 compelled further excavation in the left field corner area.

- Yankee Stadium in The Bronx.

The deepest portion of the outfield had an upslope when the park was first built, notably in left center. It was pretty well covered over and leveled out when the bleachers were rebuilt in the 1930s.

== Sources ==
- Green Cathedrals, by Philip J. Lowry
- Ballparks of North America, by Michael Benson
