= 1961 Duke Blue Devils baseball team =

American college baseball season

1961 Duke Blue Devils baseball

Atlantic Coast Conference champions District III champions

College World Series, T-5th
- Conference: Atlantic Coast Conference
- CB: No. 6
- Record: 16–11 (11–3 ACC)
- Head coach: Ace Parker (9th season)
- Captain: Dixon Owens
- Home stadium: Jack Coombs Field

1961 Atlantic Coast Conference baseball standings
	Conf.				Overall
Team	W		L	PCT	W		L	PCT
No. 6 Duke ‍†‍‡‍^{y}	11	–	3	.786	16	–	11	.593
No. 24 North Carolina ‍‍‍	10	–	4	.714	15	–	7	.682
No. 27 Wake Forest ‍‍‍	9	–	5	.643	23	–	7	.767
NC State ‍‍‍	8	–	5	.615	13	–	5	.722
Clemson ‍‍‍	6	–	8	.429	12	–	11	.522
Maryland ‍‍‍	5	–	8	.385	8	–	12	.400
Virginia ‍‍‍	4	–	9	.308	7	–	11	.389
South Carolina ‍‍‍	1	–	12	.077	3	–	15	.167
† – Conference champion ‡ – Playoff champion y – Invited to the NCAA tournament As of June 30, 1961; Rankings from Collegiate Baseball

The 1961 Duke Blue Devils baseball team represented Duke University in the 1961 NCAA University Division baseball season. The Blue Devils played their home games at Jack Coombs Field. The team was coached by Ace Parker in his 9th year at Duke.

The Blue Devils won the District III playoff to advanced to the College World Series, where they were defeated by the Boston College Eagles.

== Roster ==
1961 Duke Blue Devils baseball team
Players
Coaches

#	Pos.	Name	B/T	Height	Weight	Year	Home town
	P	Don Altman	/	—	—	Sr	Freeport, Pennsylvania
	C	Art Browning	/	—	—		Portsmouth, Virginia
		John Daniel	/	—	—
	OF	Ron Davis	/	—	—	So
		Dick Densmore	/	—	—	So
	INF	Lynn Fader	/	—	—
	P	Larry Harrison	/	—	—	Jr
		Bobby Hawn	/	—	—		Winston-Salem, North Carolina
		Ron Kalish	/	—	—	Sr
		Eric Keller	/	—	—	Sr
	INF	Dean McCracken	/	—	—	Sr
	OF	Rex McKinley	/	—	—	Jr
	INF	Garry Miller	/	—	—	Sr
	C	Dixon Owens	/	—	—	Sr
	OF	Bob Rankin	/	—	—	Jr
		Bill Reynolds	/	—	—
	P	Bob Turner	/	—	—	Jr
	P	Butch Williams	/	—	—

Head coach

Ace Parker

Assistant coach(es)

Legend

- (C) Team captain
- (S) Suspended
- (I) Ineligible
- Injured
- Current redshirt

== Schedule ==
1961 Duke Blue Devils baseball game log
Regular season
March (0–4)

#	Date	Opponent	Site/stadium	Score	Overall record	ACC record
1	March 27	at Florida State	Seminole Field • Tallahassee, Florida	6–10	0–1	–
2	March 28	at Florida State	Seminole Field • Tallahassee, Florida	0–4	0–2	–
3	March 29	at Florida State	Seminole Field • Tallahassee, Florida	5–7	0–3	–
4	March 30	at Florida State	Seminole Field • Tallahassee, Florida	2–8	0–4	–

April (7–4)

#	Date	Opponent	Site/stadium	Score	Overall record	ACC record
5	April 1	vs Western Michigan	Seminole Field • Tallahassee, Florida	10–3	1–4	–
6	April 3	Ohio	Jack Coombs Field • Durham, North Carolina	3–5	1–5	–
7	April 3	Ohio	Jack Coombs Field • Durham, North Carolina	2–1	2–5	–
8	April 7	at Clemson	Riggs Field • Clemson, South Carolina	8–5	3–5	1–0
9	April 8	at South Carolina	Unknown • Columbia, South Carolina	8–1	4–5	2–0
10	April 14	at Maryland	Shipley Field • College Park, Maryland	11–5	5–5	3–0
11	April 15	at Virginia	Unknown • Charlottesville, Virginia	9–2	6–5	4–0
12	April 18	at NC State	Riddick Stadium • Raleigh, North Carolina	1–3	6–6	4–1
13	April 21	North Carolina	Jack Coombs Field • Durham, North Carolina	4–9	6–7	4–2
14	April 25	NC State	Jack Coombs Field • Durham, North Carolina	1–3	6–8	4–3
15	April 29	Maryland	Jack Coombs Field • Durham, North Carolina	5–1	7–8	5–3

May (6–1)

#	Date	Opponent	Site/stadium	Score	Overall record	ACC record
16	May 2	at North Carolina	Emerson Field • Chapel Hill, North Carolina	10–4	8–8	6–3
17	May 5	South Carolina	Jack Coombs Field • Durham, North Carolina	1–0	9–8	7–3
18	May 6	Clemson	Jack Coombs Field • Durham, North Carolina	3–1	10–8	8–3
19	May 8	Wake Forest	Jack Coombs Field • Durham, North Carolina	12–10	11–8	9–3
20	May 10	at Wake Forest	Ernie Shore Field • Winston-Salem, North Carolina	3–1	12–8	10–3
21	May 13	at Navy	Unknown • Annapolis, Maryland	4–1	12–9	10–3
22	May 19	at Virginia	Unknown • Charlottesville, Virginia	5–1	13–9	11–3

Postseason
District III Playoff (2–0)

#	Date	Opponent	Site/stadium	Score	Overall record	ACC record
23	June 1	vs Florida State	Sims Legion Park • Gastonia, North Carolina	7–2	14–9	11–3
24	June 3	vs West Virginia	Sims Legion Park • Gastonia, North Carolina	7–3	15–9	11–3

College World Series (1–2)

#	Date	Opponent	Site/stadium	Score	Overall record	ACC record
25	June 9	vs Oklahoma State	Omaha Municipal Stadium • Omaha, Nebraska	2–3	15–10	11–3
26	June 11	vs Colorado State College	Omaha Municipal Stadium • Omaha, Nebraska	15–3	16–10	11–3
27	June 12	vs Boston College	Omaha Municipal Stadium • Omaha, Nebraska	3–4	16–11	11–3

== Awards and honors ==
Don Altman

- Second Team All-Atlantic Coast Conference

Ron Davis

- Second Team All-Atlantic Coast Conference
- All-District III Tournament Team
- College World Series All-Tournament Team

Lynn Fader

- First Team All-Atlantic Coast Conference
- All-District III Tournament Team

Rex McKinley

- Second Team All-Atlantic Coast Conference

Garry Miller

- Second Team All-Atlantic Coast Conference

Butch Williams

- All-District III Tournament Team'
