= 1961 Texas Longhorns baseball team =

American college baseball season

1961 Texas Longhorns baseball

SWC champions

College World Series, 0–2
- Conference: Southwest Conference
- Record: 22–6–2 (11–3–2 SWC)
- Head coach: Bibb Falk (19th year)
- Home stadium: Clark Field

1961 Southwest Conference baseball standings
	Conf.				Overall
Team	W		L	PCT	W		L	PCT
No. 8 Texas ‍†‍‍^{y}	11	–	3	.786	22	–	6	.786
No. 25 Baylor ‍‍‍	10	–	4	.714	18	–	4	.818
Rice ‍‍‍	6	–	6	.500	13	–	11	.542
Texas A&M ‍‍‍	6	–	8	.429	14	–	10	.583
TCU ‍‍‍	6	–	8	.429	7	–	16	.304
SMU ‍‍‍	1	–	11	.083	5	–	16	.238
† – Conference champion y – Invited to the NCAA tournament As of June 30, 1961; Rankings from Collegiate Baseball

The 1961 Texas Longhorns baseball team represented the University of Texas at Austin in the 1961 NCAA University Division baseball season. The Longhorns played their home games at Clark Field. The team was coached by Bibb Falk in his 19th season at Texas.

The Longhorns reached the College World Series, but were eliminated after losing their first two games to Southern California and Western Michigan.

== Personnel ==
=== Roster ===
1961 Texas Longhorns roster
Pitchers: - Tim Belcher; - Bob Callaway; Catchers Manager: - Vernon Shelton	Infielders: - Pat Rigby; Outfielders: - Chuck Knutson	Unknown: - Art Adams; - Lewis E. Brazelton; - David W. Burleson; - Gordon L. Ginn; - Phillip L. Hipps; - Terry Jackson; - Gary E. London; - Walter New; - John M. Pinckney; - Samuel Rosson Jr.; - David Taylor Skinner; - Justin M. Wakeland

== Schedule and results ==
Legend
Texas win
Texas loss
Tie

1961 Texas Longhorns baseball game log
Regular season

March
Date	Opponent	Site/stadium	Score	Overall record	SWC record
Mar 6	Sam Houston State Teachers College*	Clark Field • Austin, TX	W 5–3	1–0	
Mar 7	Sam Houston State Teachers College*	Clark Field • Austin, TX	W 6–5	2–0	
Mar 10	Oklahoma*	Clark Field • Austin, TX	W 11–0	3–0	
Mar 11	Oklahoma*	Clark Field • Austin, TX	W 3–0	4–0	
Mar 14	Texas Lutheran*	Clark Field • Austin, TX	W 7–2	5–0	
Mar 17	Texas A&M	Clark Field • Austin, TX	T 6–6	5–0–1	0–0–1
Mar 20	Minnesota*	Clark Field • Austin, TX	W 19–7	6–0–1	
Mar 21	Minnesota*	Clark Field • Austin, TX	W 14–9	7–0–1	
Mar 25	Baylor	Clark Field • Austin, TX	W 26–7	8–0–1	1–0–1
Mar 28	SMU	Clark Field • Austin, TX	W 7–6	9–0–1	2–0–1
Mar 30	Fort Hood*	Clark Field • Austin, TX	W 5–2	10–0–1	

April
Date	Opponent	Site/stadium	Score	Overall record	SWC record
Apr 4	at TCU	Fort Worth, TX	W 15–13	11–0–1	3–0–1
Apr 10	Brooke Army Medical Center*	Clark Field • Austin, TX	W 11–4	12–0–1	
Apr 14	at SMU	Dallas, TX	W 15–4	13–0–1	4–0–1
Apr 15	at SMU	Dallas, TX	W 15–11	14–0–1	5–0–1
Apr 21	Rice	Clark Field • Austin, TX	W 12–6	15–0–1	6–0–1
Apr 22	Rice	Clark Field • Austin, TX	W 8–0^{7}	16–0–1	7–0–1
Apr 22	Rice	Clark Field • Austin, TX	W 11–6	17–0–1	8–0–1
Apr 25	at Brooke Army Medical Center*	Fort Sam Houston • San Antonio, TX	L 9–12	17–1–1	

May
Date	Opponent	Site/stadium	Score	Overall record	SWC record
May 4	TCU	Clark Field • Austin, TX	L 8–9	17–2–1	8–1–1
May 5	TCU	Clark Field • Austin, TX	W 5–3	18–2–1	9–1–1
May 8	Texas A&M	Clark Field • Austin, TX	W 17–3	19–2–1	10–1–1
May 12	at Texas A&M	Kyle Baseball Field • College Station, TX	L 6–13	19–3–1	10–2–1
May 13	at Texas A&M	Kyle Baseball Field • College Station, TX	W 15–5	20–3–1	11–2–1
May 17	at Baylor	Waco, TX	L 2–3	20–4–1	11–3–1
May 17	at Baylor	Waco, TX	T 9–9	20–4–2	11–3–2

Postseason

District 6 playoffs
Date	Opponent	Site/stadium	Score	Overall record	Playoff record
June 5	Arizona	Clark Field • Austin, TX	W 8–2	21–4–2	1–0
June 6	Arizona	Clark Field • Austin, TX	W 5–4	22–4–2	2–0

College World Series
Date	Opponent	Site/stadium	Score	Overall record	CWS record
June 10	Southern California	Johnny Rosenblatt Stadium • Omaha, NE	L 6–8	22–5–2	0–1
June 11	Western Michigan	Johnny Rosenblatt Stadium • Omaha, NE	L 2–8	22–6–2	0–2
