= 1961 USC Trojans baseball team =

American college baseball season

1961 USC Trojans baseball

College World Series champions CIBA Champions
- Conference: Athletic Association of Western Universities
- CB: No. 1
- Record: 36–7 (12–4 AAWU)
- Head coach: Rod Dedeaux (20th year)
- Home stadium: Bovard Field

1961 Athletic Association of Western Universities baseball standings
	Conf.				Overall
Team	W		L	PCT	W		L	PCT
North Division
No. 28 Washington State ‍†‍‍^{y}	8	–	4	.667	21	–	10	.677
Oregon State ‍‍‍	8	–	6	.571	27	–	14	.659
Oregon ‍‍‍	6	–	5	.545		–		–
Idaho ‍‍‍	6	–	9	.400		–		–
Washington ‍‍‍	4	–	8	.333	13	–	10	.565
California Intercollegiate Baseball Association
No. 1 Southern California ‍†‍‍^{y}	12	–	4	.750	36	–	7	.837
No. 14 California ‍‍‍	11	–	5	.688	29	–	10	.744
UCLA ‍‍‍	7	–	9	.438	25	–	15	.625
Santa Clara ‍‍‍	5	–	11	.313		–		–
Stanford ‍‍‍	5	–	11	.313	26	–	17	.605
† – Conference champion y – Invited to the NCAA tournament As of June 30, 1961; Rankings from Collegiate Baseball

The 1961 USC Trojans baseball team represented the University of Southern California in the 1961 NCAA University Division baseball season. The team was coached Rod Dedeaux in his 20th season.

The Trojans won the College World Series, defeating the Oklahoma State in the championship game. This was the Trojans' third championship.

== Roster ==
1961 USC Trojans roster
Pitchers: Dennis Anderson; Bob Coleman; Larry Hankammer; Pete Kenney; Lee King; Marcel Lachermann; Bob Levingston; Jerry Merz; Jim Withers; Wally Wolf; Ken Yaryan	Infielders: Dan Ardell; Chuck Johnson; Willie Ryan; Tom Satriano; Hans Schroeder; Ron Stillwell; Catchers: Steve Bach; John Crawford; Larry Himes; Dick Mills	Outfielders: Truman Aubrey; Jim Brown; Art Ersepke; Mike Gillespie; Mickey McNamee; Ron Taylor; Ken Washington; Coaches: Rod Dedeaux

== Schedule ==
Legend
USC win
USC loss

1961 USC Trojans baseball game log
Regular season

March
Date	Opponent	Site/stadium	Score	Overall record	AAWU record
March 10	Cal Poly	Bovard Field • Los Angeles, CA	W 8–1	1–0	–
March 11	San Diego	Bovard Field • Los Angeles, CA	W 9–1	2–0	–
March 14	Occidental	Bovard Field • Los Angeles, CA	W 7–3	3–0	–
March 17	Long Beach State	Bovard Field • Los Angeles, CA	W 11–1	4–0	–
March 18	at Long Beach State	Blair Field • Long Beach, CA	W 1–0	5–0	–
March 21	at Loyola Marymount	Los Angeles, CA	W 14–2	6–0	–
March 23	BYU	Bovard Field • Los Angeles, CA	W 3–0	7–0	–
March 23	at Cal State Los Angeles	Los Angeles, CA	W 4–1	8–0	–
March 24	at UC Santa Barbara	Santa Barbara, CA	L 1–3	8–1	–
March 25	at UCLA	Joe E. Brown Field • Los Angeles, CA	W 7–2	9–1	1–0
March 27	vs. Stanford		W 8–1	10–1	–
March 29	vs. San Diego State		W 15–2	11–1	–
March 30	vs. Arizona State		W 10–2	12–1	–

April
Date	Opponent	Site/stadium	Score	Overall record	AAWU record
April 3	Notre Dame	Bovard Field • Los Angeles, CA	W 4–3	13–1	–
April 4	Arizona	Bovard Field • Los Angeles, CA	L 0–8	13–2	–
April 7	California	Bovard Field • Los Angeles, CA	W 4–3	14–2	2–0
April 8	California	Bovard Field • Los Angeles, CA	L 1–2	14–3	2–1
April 11	Loyola Marymount	Bovard Field • Los Angeles, CA	W 8–5	15–3	–
April 14	at Stanford	Sunken Diamond • Stanford, CA	W 3–2	16–3	3–1
April 15	at Santa Clara	Santa Clara, CA	L 3–4	16–4	3–2
April 15	at Santa Clara	Santa Clara, CA	W 15–5	17–4	4–2
April 18	at Pepperdine	Malibu, CA	L 3–4	18–4	–
April 21	Santa Clara	Bovard Field • Los Angeles, CA	W 9–4	19–4	5–2
April 22	Santa Clara	Bovard Field • Los Angeles, CA	W 8–6	20–4	6–2
April 28	Stanford	Bovard Field • Los Angeles, CA	W 7–2	21–4	7–2
April 29	Stanford	Bovard Field • Los Angeles, CA	W 11–2	22–4	8–2

May
Date	Opponent	Site/stadium	Score	Overall record	AAWU record
May 2	at UCLA	Joe E. Brown Field • Los Angeles, CA	W 3–1	23–4	9–2
May 5	UCLA	Bovard Field • Los Angeles, CA	W 11–8	24–4	10–2
May 6	at UCLA	Joe E. Brown Field • Los Angeles, CA	W 6–4	25–4	11–2
May 9	Cal Poly Pomona	Bovard Field • Los Angeles, CA	W 3–2	26–4	–
May 12	at Stanford	Sunken Diamond • Stanford, CA	L 5–7	26–5	11–3
May 13	at California	Evans Diamond • Berkeley, CA	W 5–4	27–5	12–3
May 13	at California	Evans Diamond • Berkeley, CA	L 6–10	27–6	12–4

Postseason

NCAA District 8 playoff
Date	Opponent	Site/stadium	Score	Overall record	NCAAT record
May 26	Fresno State	Bovard Field • Los Angeles, CA	W 4–1	28–6	1–0
May 27	Fresno State	Bovard Field • Los Angeles, CA	L 4–6	28–7	1–1
May 27	Fresno State	Bovard Field • Los Angeles, CA	W 10–6	29–7	2–1
June 2	at Washington State	Bailey Field • Pullman, WA	W 13–6	30–7	3–1
June 3	at Washington State	Bailey Field • Pullman, WA	W 10–4	31–7	4–1

College World Series
Date	Opponent	Site/stadium	Score	Overall record	CWS record
June 10	vs. Texas	Johnny Rosenblatt Stadium • Omaha, NE	W 8–6	32–7	1–0
June 11	vs. Boston College	Johnny Rosenblatt Stadium • Omaha, NE	W 10–3	33–7	2–0
June 12	vs. Oklahoma State	Johnny Rosenblatt Stadium • Omaha, NE	W 4–2	34–7	3–0
June 13	vs. Boston College	Johnny Rosenblatt Stadium • Omaha, NE	W 4–3	35–7	4–0
June 15	vs. Oklahoma State	Johnny Rosenblatt Stadium • Omaha, NE	W 1–0	36–7	5–0

== Awards and honors ==
Steve Bach

- All-AAWU First Team

Art Ersepke

- College World Series All-Tournament Team
- All-AAWU First Team

Larry Hankhammer

- College World Series All-Tournament Team

Larry Himes

- College World Series All-Tournament Team
- All-America Second Team
- All-AAWU First Team

William Ryan

- All-America First Team
- College World Series All-Tournament Team
- All-AAWU First Team

Jim Withers

- All-AAWU First Team
