= 1961 Colorado State College Bears baseball team =

American college baseball season

1961 Colorado State College Bears baseball

Rocky Mountain Conference champions District VII champions

College World Series, T-7th
- Conference: Rocky Mountain Conference
- CB: No. 7
- Record: 28–8 (14–0 RMC)
- Head coach: Pete Butler (19th season)
- Home stadium: Jackson Field

The 1961 Colorado State College Bears baseball team represented Colorado State College in the 1961 NCAA University Division baseball season. The Bears played their home games at Jackson Field. The team was coached by Pete Butler in his 19th year at Colorado State.

The Bears won the District VII playoff to advanced to the College World Series, where they were defeated by the Duke Blue Devils.

== Roster ==
1961 Colorado State College Bears baseball team
Players
Coaches

#	Pos.	Name	B/T	Height	Weight	Year	Home town
	LHP	Ernie Andrade	/L	—	—
20	INF	Jerry Arthur	L/L	—	—
	OF	Bob Brasda	/R	—	—
	INF	Ron Faulkner	/L	—	—
	OF	Doug Fitch	/R	—	—
	RHP	Chuck Chamberlain	/R	—	—
19	INF	Ron English	/R	—	—
21	C	John Groninger	S/R	—	—
	INF	Gary Harder	/R	—	—
	OF	Norm Idleberg	R/L	—	—
5	INF	John Koehler	R/R	—	—
	C	Jim Lochner	/R	—	—
	LHP	Jerry Maglia	/L	—	—
	INF	Jack Miyamoto	/R	—	—
	RHP	Pat Pine	/	—	—
	INF	Bob Preisendorf	L/	—	—
	C	Al Suydum	/R	—	—
	RHP	Les Wood	/R	—	—
25	RHP	Jay Woodward	/R	—	—
	OF	Julie Yearling	L/	—	—

Head coach

Pete Butler

Assistant coach(es)

Legend

- (C) Team captain
- (S) Suspended
- (I) Ineligible
- Injured
- Current redshirt

== Schedule ==
1961 Colorado State College Bears baseball game log
Regular season
March (3–4)

#	Date	Opponent	Site/stadium	Score	Overall record	RMC record
1	March	at New Mexico State	Unknown • Las Cruces, New Mexico	17–3	1–0	–
2	March	at New Mexico State	Unknown • Las Cruces, New Mexico	2–4	1–1	–
3	March	at New Mexico State	Unknown • Las Cruces, New Mexicoa	11–3	2–1	–
4	March 14	at New Mexico	Lobo Field • Albuquerque, New Mexico	8–6	3–1	–
5	March 17	at Arizona	UA Field • Tucson, Arizona	2–7	3–2	–
6	March 18	at Arizona	UA Field • Tucson, Arizona	0–2	3–3	–
7	March 18	at Arizona	UA Field • Tucson, Arizona	3–11	3–4	–

April (11–1)

#	Date	Opponent	Site/stadium	Score	Overall record	RMC record
8	April	vs Colorado Mines	Unknown • Unknown	11–0	4–4	1–0
9	April	vs Colorado Mines	Unknown • Unknown	39–1	5–4	2–0
10	April	vs Denver	Unknown • Unknown	11–6	6–4	2–0
11	April	vs Colorado College	Unknown • Unknown	18–1	7–4	3–0
12	April	vs Colorado College	Unknown • Unknown	34–1	8–4	4–0
13	April 19	Air Force	Jackson Field • Greeley, Colorado	5–11	8–5	4–0
14	April	vs Wyoming	Unknown • Unknown	5–4	9–5	4–0
15	April	vs Wyoming	Unknown • Unknown	20–12	10–5	4–0
16	April	vs Colorado State	Unknown • Unknown	10–5	11–6	4–0
17	April	vs Colorado Mines	Unknown • Unknown	9–2	12–5	5–0
18	April	vs Western State	Unknown • Unknown	24–3	13–5	6–0
19	April	vs Western State	Unknown • Unknown	18–11	14–5	7–0

May (11–0)

#	Date	Opponent	Site/stadium	Score	Overall record	RMC record
20	May	vs Colorado Mines	Unknown • Unknown	25–3	15–5	8–0
21	May	vs Adams State	Unknown • Unknown	11–2	16–5	9–0
22	May	vs Adams State	Unknown • Unknown	4–2	17–5	10–0
23	May	vs Denver	Unknown • Unknown	9–6	18–5	10–0
24	May	vs Colorado State	Unknown • Unknown	15–3	19–5	10–0
25	May	vs Colorado College	Unknown • Unknown	26–1	20–5	11–0
26	May	vs Denver	Unknown • Unknown	3–0	21–5	11–0
27	May 17	vs Air Force	Unknown • Unknown	4–3	22–5	11–0
28	May	vs Adams State	Unknown • Unknown	12–9	23–5	12–0
29	May	vs Adams State	Unknown • Unknown	6–2	24–5	13–0
30	May	vs Colorado College	Unknown • Unknown	26–1	25–5	14–0

Postseason
District VII Playoff (3–1)

#	Date	Opponent	Site/stadium	Score	Overall record	RMC record
31	May 24	at Wyoming	Unknown • Laramie, Wyoming	2–3	25–6	14–0
32	May 25	vs Air Force	Unknown • Laramie, Wyoming	10–6	26–6	14–0
33	May 26	at Wyoming	Unknown • Laramie, Wyoming	16–12	27–6	14–0
34	May 26	at Wyoming	Unknown • Laramie, Wyoming	12–1	28–6	14–0

College World Series (0–2)

#	Date	Opponent	Site/stadium	Score	Overall record	RMC record
35	June 10	vs Syracuse	Omaha Municipal Stadium • Omaha, Nebraska	5–12	28–7	14–0
36	June 11	vs Duke	Omaha Municipal Stadium • Omaha, Nebraska	3–15	28–8	14–0

== Awards and honors ==
Ernie Andrade

- All-Rocky Mountain Conference Team

Jerry Arthur

- All-Rocky Mountain Conference Team

Norman Idleberg

- All-Rocky Mountain Conference Team

John Koehler

- All-Rocky Mountain Conference Team

Jerry Maglia

- All-Rocky Mountain Conference Team

Robert Preisemdorf

- All-Rocky Mountain Conference Team

Julie Yearling

- All-Rocky Mountain Conference Team
