= 1961 NCAA University Division baseball season =

Baseball season

NCAA tournament
- Duration: May 26–June 15, 1961

College World Series
- Champions: USC (3rd title)
- Runners-up: Oklahoma State (5th CWS Appearance)
- Winning coach: Rod Dedeaux (3rd title)
- MOP: Littleton Fowler (Oklahoma State)

Seasons
- ← 1960 1962 →

The 1961 NCAA University Division baseball season, play of college baseball in the United States organized by the National Collegiate Athletic Association (NCAA) began in the spring of 1961. The season progressed through the regular season and concluded with the 1961 College World Series. The College World Series, held for the fifteenth time in 1961, consisted of one team from each of eight geographical districts and was held in Omaha, Nebraska at Johnny Rosenblatt Stadium as a double-elimination tournament. Southern California claimed the championship.

== Conference winners ==
This is a partial list of conference champions from the 1961 season. Each of the eight geographical districts chose, by various methods, the team that would represent them in the NCAA tournament. 9 teams earned automatic bids by winning their conference championship while 16 teams earned at-large selections.

| Conference | Regular season winner |
|---|---|
| Atlantic Coast Conference | Duke |
| Big Eight Conference | Oklahoma State |
| Big Ten Conference | Michigan |
| CIBA | Southern California |
| EIBL | Navy |
| Mid-American Conference | Western Michigan |
| Pacific Coast Conference | Washington State |
| Southeastern Conference | LSU |
| Southern Conference | West Virginia |
| Southwest Conference | Texas |
| Yankee Conference | Connecticut |

== Conference standings ==
The following is an incomplete list of conference standings:

1961 Athletic Association of Western Universities baseball standings
| | Conf. | | | | Overall |
| Team | W | | L | PCT | W | | L | PCT |
|---|---|---|---|---|---|---|---|---|
North Division
| No. 28 Washington State ‍†‍‍^{y} | 8 | – | 4 | .667 | 21 | – | 10 | .677 |
| Oregon State ‍‍‍ | 8 | – | 6 | .571 | 27 | – | 14 | .659 |
| Oregon ‍‍‍ | 6 | – | 5 | .545 | | – | | – |
| Idaho ‍‍‍ | 6 | – | 9 | .400 | | – | | – |
| Washington ‍‍‍ | 4 | – | 8 | .333 | 13 | – | 10 | .565 |
California Intercollegiate Baseball Association
| No. 1 Southern California ‍†‍‍^{y} | 12 | – | 4 | .750 | 36 | – | 7 | .837 |
| No. 14 California ‍‍‍ | 11 | – | 5 | .688 | 29 | – | 10 | .744 |
| UCLA ‍‍‍ | 7 | – | 9 | .438 | 25 | – | 15 | .625 |
| Santa Clara ‍‍‍ | 5 | – | 11 | .313 | | – | | – |
| Stanford ‍‍‍ | 5 | – | 11 | .313 | 26 | – | 17 | .605 |
† – Conference champion y – Invited to the NCAA tournament As of June 30, 1961; Rankings from Collegiate Baseball

1961 Atlantic Coast Conference baseball standings
| | Conf. | | | | Overall |
| Team | W | | L | PCT | W | | L | PCT |
|---|---|---|---|---|---|---|---|---|
| No. 6 Duke ‍†‍‡‍^{y} | 11 | – | 3 | .786 | 16 | – | 11 | .593 |
| No. 24 North Carolina ‍‍‍ | 10 | – | 4 | .714 | 15 | – | 7 | .682 |
| No. 27 Wake Forest ‍‍‍ | 9 | – | 5 | .643 | 23 | – | 7 | .767 |
| NC State ‍‍‍ | 8 | – | 5 | .615 | 13 | – | 5 | .722 |
| Clemson ‍‍‍ | 6 | – | 8 | .429 | 12 | – | 11 | .522 |
| Maryland ‍‍‍ | 5 | – | 8 | .385 | 8 | – | 12 | .400 |
| Virginia ‍‍‍ | 4 | – | 9 | .308 | 7 | – | 11 | .389 |
| South Carolina ‍‍‍ | 1 | – | 12 | .077 | 3 | – | 15 | .167 |
† – Conference champion ‡ – Playoff champion y – Invited to the NCAA tournament As of June 30, 1961; Rankings from Collegiate Baseball

1961 Big Eight Conference baseball standings
| | Conf. | | | | Overall |
| Team | W | | L | PCT | W | | L | PCT |
|---|---|---|---|---|---|---|---|---|
| No. 2 Oklahoma State ‍†‍‍^{y} | 18 | – | 1 | .947 | 27 | – | 3 | .900 |
| Missouri ‍‍‍ | 13 | – | 6 | .684 | 16 | – | 7 | .696 |
| Colorado ‍‍‍ | 9 | – | 8 | .529 | 21 | – | 11 | .656 |
| Kansas State ‍‍‍ | 10 | – | 10 | .500 | 10 | – | 12 | .455 |
| Oklahoma ‍‍‍ | 9 | – | 10 | .474 | 10 | – | 15 | .400 |
| Nebraska ‍‍‍ | 7 | – | 11 | .389 | 9 | – | 14 | .391 |
| Iowa State ‍‍‍ | 3 | – | 13 | .188 | 5 | – | 14 | .263 |
| Kansas ‍‍‍ | 2 | – | 12 | .143 | 5 | – | 14 | .263 |
† – Conference champion y – Invited to the NCAA tournament As of June 30, 1961; Rankings from Collegiate Baseball

1961 Mid-American Conference baseball standings
| | Conf. | | | | | | Overall |
| Team | W | | L | | T | PCT | W | | L | | T | PCT |
|---|---|---|---|---|---|---|---|---|---|---|---|---|
| No. 5 Western Michigan ‍†‍‍^{y} | 11 | – | 0 | – | 0 | 1.000 | 19 | – | 8 | – | 0 | .704 |
| Kent State ‍‍‍ | 9 | – | 2 | – | 0 | .818 | 12 | – | 7 | – | 0 | .632 |
| Ohio ‍‍‍ | 7 | – | 3 | – | 0 | .700 | 13 | – | 6 | – | 0 | .684 |
| Miami (OH) ‍‍‍ | 3 | – | 6 | – | 0 | .333 | 5 | – | 11 | – | 1 | .324 |
| Bowling Green ‍‍‍ | 2 | – | 7 | – | 0 | .222 | 6 | – | 12 | – | 1 | .342 |
| Marshall ‍‍‍ | 2 | – | 8 | – | 0 | .200 | 8 | – | 12 | – | 1 | .405 |
| Toledo ‍‍‍ | 1 | – | 9 | – | 0 | .100 | 2 | – | 16 | – | 0 | .111 |
† – Conference champion y – Invited to the NCAA tournament As of June 30, 1961; Rankings from Collegiate Baseball

1961 Southwest Conference baseball standings
| | Conf. | | | | Overall |
| Team | W | | L | PCT | W | | L | PCT |
|---|---|---|---|---|---|---|---|---|
| No. 8 Texas ‍†‍‍^{y} | 11 | – | 3 | .786 | 22 | – | 6 | .786 |
| No. 25 Baylor ‍‍‍ | 10 | – | 4 | .714 | 18 | – | 4 | .818 |
| Rice ‍‍‍ | 6 | – | 6 | .500 | 13 | – | 11 | .542 |
| Texas A&M ‍‍‍ | 6 | – | 8 | .429 | 14 | – | 10 | .583 |
| TCU ‍‍‍ | 6 | – | 8 | .429 | 7 | – | 16 | .304 |
| SMU ‍‍‍ | 1 | – | 11 | .083 | 5 | – | 16 | .238 |
† – Conference champion y – Invited to the NCAA tournament As of June 30, 1961; Rankings from Collegiate Baseball

== College World Series ==
The 1961 season marked the fifteenth NCAA baseball tournament, which culminated with the eight team College World Series. The College World Series was held in Omaha, Nebraska. The eight teams played a double-elimination format, with Southern California claiming their third championship with a 1–0 win over Oklahoma State in the final.

Upper round 1
Oklahoma State | 3
Duke | 2
Syracuse | 12
Colorado State College | 5
Boston College | 3
Western Michigan | 2
Southern California | 8
Texas | 6

Upper round 2
Oklahoma State | 12
Syracuse | 9
Boston College | 3
Southern California | 10
Lower round 1
Duke | 15
Colorado State College | 3
Western Michigan | 8
Texas | 2

Upper final
Oklahoma State | 2
Southern California | 4
Lower round 2
Boston College | 4^{10}
Duke | 3
Syracuse | 6
Western Michigan | 0

Semifinals
Oklahoma State | 8
Syracuse | 0
Southern California | 4
Boston College | 3

Final
Oklahoma State | 0
Southern California | 1
