= Ted Kleinhans =

American baseball player (1899–1985)

- Pitcher
- Born: April 8, 1899; Deer Park, Wisconsin, U.S.
- Died: July 24, 1985 (aged 86); Redington Beach, Florida, U.S.
- Batted: Right Threw: Left

MLB debut
- April 20, 1934, for the Philadelphia Phillies

Last MLB appearance
- April 20, 1938, for the Cincinnati Reds

MLB statistics
- Win–loss record: 4–9
- Earned run average: 5.26
- Strikeouts: 48
- Stats at Baseball Reference

Teams
- Philadelphia Phillies (1934); Cincinnati Reds (1934); New York Yankees (1936); Cincinnati Reds (1937–1938)

Theodore Otto Kleinhans (born Traugott Otto Kleinhans, April 8, 1899 – July 24, 1985) was an American Major League Baseball pitcher. He was born in Deer Park, Wisconsin. Kleinhans played 4 seasons in Major League Baseball, with the Philadelphia Phillies and Cincinnati Reds in 1934, the New York Yankees in 1936, and the Reds again in 1937 and 1938. He had a career record of 4–9 in 56 games. He was the third oldest player in Major League Baseball in 1938.

Prior to playing professional baseball, Kleinhans enlisted in the Ohio National Guard. During World War I, the unit was mobilized and sent to France where he was wounded in the Meuse–Argonne offensive. He left the Guard in 1919 as a sergeant. During World War II, he again served his country, this time as a captain with a US Army medical unit stationed in Scotland and England.

From 1947 to 1966 Kleinhans was head coach for the Syracuse Orangemen baseball team, compiling a 156–146 (.516) record. He died in Redington Beach, Florida, where he lived.
