= 1961 Boston College Eagles baseball team =

American college baseball season

1961 Boston College Eagles baseball

Greater Boston League champions District I champions

College World Series, 4th
- Conference: Greater Boston Intercollegiate Baseball League
- CB: No. 3
- Record: 18–6 (9–1 GBL)
- Head coach: Eddie Pellagrini (4th season)
- Captain: Bob Martin
- Home stadium: John Shea Field

The 1961 Boston College Eagles baseball team represented Boston College in the 1961 NCAA University Division baseball season. The Eagles played their home games at John Shea Field. The team was coached by Eddie Pellagrini in his 4th year at Boston College.

The Eagles won the District I Playoff to advanced to the College World Series, where they were defeated by the Southern California Trojans.

== Roster ==
1960 Boston College Eagles baseball team
Players
Coaches

#	Pos.	Name	B/T	Height	Weight	Year	Home town
	P	Charley Bunker	/	6 ft 0 in (1.83 m)	180 lb (82 kg)
	INF	Chuck Chevalier	/	5 ft 11 in (1.8 m)	165 lb (75 kg)
	INF	Bob Ciero	/	6 ft 3 in (1.91 m)	200 lb (91 kg)
		Paul Comeau	/	—	—
	INF	Jack Coyle	/	5 ft 9 in (1.75 m)	170 lb (77 kg)
	OF	Billy Cunis	/	5 ft 7 in (1.7 m)	180 lb (82 kg)	Jr
	C	Bob DiFelice	/	5 ft 10 in (1.78 m)	170 lb (77 kg)	So
	INF	Frank Faggiano	/	5 ft 11 in (1.8 m)	170 lb (77 kg)
		Art Graham	/	—	—
	INF	Bob Graham	/	5 ft 11 in (1.8 m)	175 lb (79 kg)
	P	Gerald Greely	/	6 ft 0 in (1.83 m)	190 lb (86 kg)
	OF	Gerry Hamel	/	5 ft 9 in (1.75 m)	170 lb (77 kg)
	INF	Bernie Kilroy	/	5 ft 11 in (1.8 m)	185 lb (84 kg)
	OF	Bob Martin (C)	/	5 ft 11 in (1.8 m)	175 lb (79 kg)	Sr
	P	Tom McGahan	/	5 ft 11 in (1.8 m)	170 lb (77 kg)
	P	Jack McGann	/	5 ft 11 in (1.8 m)	175 lb (79 kg)
	P	Bob Niemiec	/	5 ft 8 in (1.73 m)	185 lb (84 kg)
	P	Bill Robinson	/	6 ft 2 in (1.88 m)	200 lb (91 kg)
	C	Frank Robotti	/	6 ft 0 in (1.83 m)	200 lb (91 kg)

Head coach

Eddie Pellagrini

Assistant coach(es)

Legend

- (C) Team captain
- (S) Suspended
- (I) Ineligible
- Injured
- Current redshirt

Roster
Last update: December 10, 2020

== Schedule ==
1961 Boston College Eagles baseball game log
Regular season
April (5–1)

#	Date	Opponent	Site/stadium	Score	Overall record	GBL record
1	April 13	at MIT	Unknown • Cambridge, Massachusetts	14–1	1–0	1–0
2	April 19	Brandeis	John Shea Field • Boston, Massachusetts	11–0	2–0	2–0
3	April 21	Saint Peter's	John Shea Field • Boston, Massachusetts	7–0	3–0	2–0
4	April 22	at Providence	Unknown • Providence, Rhode Island	11–6	4–0	2–0
5	April 27	at Tufts	Unknown • Medford, Massachusetts	7–2	5–0	3–0
6	April 29	at Colby	Unknown • Waterville, Maine	2–4	5–1	3–0

May (7–2)

#	Date	Opponent	Site/stadium	Score	Overall record	GBL record
7	May 4	Harvard	John Shea Field • Boston, Massachusetts	6–2	6–1	4–0
8	May 6	Northeastern	John Shea Field • Boston, Massachusetts	8–5	7–1	5–0
9	May 6	Northeastern	John Shea Field • Boston, Massachusetts	3–0	8–1	6–0
10	May 8	Boston University	John Shea Field • Boston, Massachusetts	3–1	9–1	7–0
11	May 11	Tufts	John Shea Field • Boston, Massachusetts	6–0	10–1	8–0
12	May 13	at Springfield	Unknown • Springfield, Massachusetts	5–8	10–2	8–0
13	May 20	Providence	John Shea Field • Boston, Massachusetts	1–4	10–3	8–1
14	May	Fordham	John Shea Field • Boston, Massachusetts	3–2	11–3	8–1
15	May 30	at Holy Cross	Fitton Field • Worcester, Massachusetts	16–1	12–3	8–1

Postseason
District I Playoff (3–1)

#	Date	Opponent	Site/stadium	Score	Overall record	GBL record
16	June	vs Springfield	AIC Park • Springfield, Massachusetts	11–8	13–3	8–1
17	June	vs Connecticut	AIC Park • Springfield, Massachusetts	4–1	14–3	8–1
18	June	vs Connecticut	AIC Park • Springfield, Massachusetts	2–3	14–4	8–1
19	June	vs Connecticut	AIC Park • Springfield, Massachusetts	14–4	15–4	8–1

June (1–0)

#	Date	Opponent	Site/stadium	Score	Overall record	GBL record
20	June 9	Holy Cross	John Shea Field • Boston, Massachusetts	5–2	16–4	9–1

College World Series (2–2)

#	Date	Opponent	Site/stadium	Score	Overall record	GBL record
21	June 10	vs Western Michigan Broncos	Omaha Municipal Stadium • Omaha, Nebraska	3–2	17–4	9–1
22	June 11	vs Southern California	Omaha Municipal Stadium • Omaha, Nebraska	3–10	17–5	9–1
23	June 12	vs Duke	Omaha Municipal Stadium • Omaha, Nebraska	4–3	18–5	9–1
24	June 13	vs Southern California	Omaha Municipal Stadium • Omaha, Nebraska	3–4	18–6	9–1
