= Clark Field (1928) =

Defunct baseball park in Texas, US

- Clark Field II
- Clark Field, with the famous goat path and hill visible in the outfield. LBJ Library can be seen in the background, to the east/southeast. Memorial Stadium is just out of frame, located behind the right field wall.

- Location within Texas Location within the United States
- Interactive map of Clark Field
- Location: Austin, Texas
- Coordinates: 30°17′09″N 97°43′52″W
- Owner: University of Texas at Austin
- Operator: University of Texas at Austin

Construction
- Opened: 1928
- Closed: 1974

Tenant
- Texas Longhorns baseball (1928–1974)

Clark Field was a baseball park in Austin, Texas, used primarily by the University of Texas Longhorns. The field was used from 1928 until 1974. It is considered one of the most novel ballparks ever conceived thanks to its location. There was a limestone cliff in the outfield that created havoc for outfielders and made baseball games exciting. It was replaced by UFCU Disch–Falk Field in 1975.

== Cliff ==
Clark Field was unusual because there was a 12- to 30-foot (9.1 m) limestone cliff that ran from left-center to center field that made playing the outfield adventurous. The cliff could only be accessed via a goat path in the left-center field. Center field was nicknamed "Billy Goat Hill." There was a scoreboard on top of the hill in the field in front of the fence that could cause even more weird bounces for outfielders. Clearly, this gave the Longhorns a home field advantage over visiting teams. For example, the Longhorns could easily get an inside-the-park home run when a ball was hit in the direction of the cliff because the opposing outfielders were perplexed by its caroms and how to make plays by using the cliff. Longhorn outfielders could typically hold batters to a double or triple because of their familiarity with the cliff. Half of the team's outfielders purportedly chose to play on top while the other half chose to play in front of the cliff.

== Atmosphere ==
While the ballpark had an irregular outfield, the stadium only sat 2,000. The stadium had an intimate yet palatial feeling that mirrored other jewel box ballparks such as Wrigley Field, Fenway Park, and Tiger Stadium. Once when the Texas A&M Aggies visited Clark Field, the crowd overflowed into right field and rowdiness ensued, which happened regularly when other visiting teams played there as well. In the late 1960s, the Sam Houston State Bearkats regularly opened with weekend doubleheaders in Austin.

== Miscellaneous ==
According to legend, Lou Gehrig hit a towering 550-foot (170 m) home run over "Billy Goat Hill" and the 40-foot (12 m) high fence in center field during a 1930 exhibition game off of University of Texas baseball hall-of-fame pitcher Mario "Mike" de la Fuente. The dimensions of Clark Field were 350 feet (110 m) to the left field wall, 401 feet (122 m) to deepest center, and 300 feet (91 m) to right field. Six no-hitters were thrown at Clark Field, all by the Longhorns during its tenure. The Longhorns won an astonishing 37 Southwest Conference baseball championships as well as two College World Series championships (1949–1950), being runner-up in 1953 and College World Series appearances in 1952, 1957, 1961, 1962, 1963, 1965, 1966, 1968, 1969, 1970, 1972, 1973, and 1974 while calling Clark Field home.

== Clark Fields ==
There have been three athletic facilities on the campus named for the university's influential early leader James Benjamin Clark.

The first Clark Field, at the southeast corner of 24th Street and Speedway, operated from 1887 through 1927, then was closed for the construction of the Mechanical Engineering Building a.k.a. Taylor Hall. The field was located a couple of blocks northwest of Memorial Stadium.

For 1928 the second and best-known Clark Field was inaugurated, north of Memorial Stadium, on the northwest corner of 23rd Street and Red River Street. That corner was the location of center field, as the diamond was in the northwest corner of the lot. Red River was later renamed Robert Dedman Drive, and the current thoroughfare designated as Red River Street is a block farther east, on the other side of the LBJ Library. That building is visible in the background of some of the later photos of Clark Field.

That same year, 1928, a recreation area called Freshman Field was opened, just southwest of Memorial Stadium, at a location given by the UT writeup as "east of Waller Creek between 19th and 21st Streets", although it appears that it was actually west of Waller Creek.

For 1975 the baseball team moved to their new ballpark, and Clark Field was closed to allow construction of the College of Fine Arts and the Performing Arts Center. Freshman Field was soon renamed as the third Clark Field. In the 1980s and 1990s, the Clark Field property underwent significant redevelopment, but a portion of the field was retained as Clark Field, a roughly oval-shaped field surrounded by a track. The current field is bounded by the creek and San Jacinto Boulevard to the northeast, east and southeast; and touched by Jester Circle to the west. The rest of the field is bounded by campus buildings.

== See also ==
- List of terraces at baseball venues
- Texas Longhorns baseball
- Austin, Texas
- University of Texas at Austin
- Bevo
- Hook 'em Horns
- The Eyes of Texas
- Texas Fight

== Sources ==
- "Green Cathedrals," Philip J. Lowry, c. 2006
