= Rudy Regalado (baseball) =

American baseball player (1930–2018)

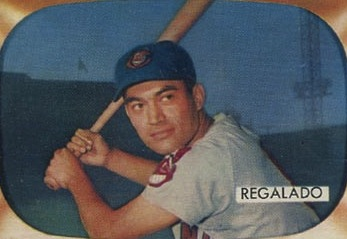
- Third baseman
- Born: May 21, 1930; Los Angeles, California
- Died: February 12, 2018 (aged 87); San Diego, California
- Batted: Right Threw: Right

MLB debut
- April 13, 1954, for the Cleveland Indians

Last MLB appearance
- June 1, 1956, for the Cleveland Indians

MLB statistics
- Batting average: .249
- Home runs: 2
- Runs batted in: 31
- Stats at Baseball Reference

Teams
- Cleveland Indians (1954–1956)

Rudolph Valentino Regalado (May 21, 1930 – February 12, 2018) was an American third baseman in Major League Baseball for the Cleveland Indians from 1954 to 1956, and played in the 1954 World Series.

He was born in Los Angeles, California and was of Mexicans descent. He died in 2018.

Regalado also played three seasons in the Venezuelan League, winning a batting title with a .366 batting average while playing for Pampero in the 1958-59 tournament.
