= Dan Ardell =

American baseball player (born 1941)

- First baseman
- Born: May 27, 1941 (age 85); Seattle, Washington, U.S.
- Batted: Left Threw: Left

MLB debut
- September 14, 1961, for the Los Angeles Angels

Last MLB appearance
- September 27, 1961, for the Los Angeles Angels

MLB statistics
- Batting average: .250
- Home runs: 0
- Hits: 1
- RBI: 0
- Stats at Baseball Reference

Teams
- Los Angeles Angels (1961)

Daniel Miers Ardell (born May 27, 1941) is an American former professional baseball player. A first baseman, he was one of the first amateur players signed by the expansion Los Angeles Angels in the Angels' maiden season, 1961. Ardell spent most of that year in the lower minors, but was recalled for a seven-game Major League trial in September. After appearing in three games as a pinch runner, Ardell singled in his first big-league at bat as a pinch hitter on September 20 against Ron Kline of the Detroit Tigers.

Ardell threw and batted left-handed and was listed at 6 feet 2 inches (1.88 m) tall and 195 pounds (88 kg). He was signed by the Angels on July 15, 1961, after his college baseball career at the University of Southern California. He was one of two players signed off the campus of 1961 NCAA tournament champion USC that season; Tom Satriano, who joined the Angels a week after Ardell, would fashion a ten-year Major League career. Ardell was loaned to the Class D Artesia Dodgers for the 1961 season (where he batted .240 in 33 games) before his September recall. After his pinch single against the Tigers, he appeared in three more games (starting one at first base) and was hitless in three at bats.

Ardell did not return to the Majors after 1961. He played from 1962 to 1964 in the Angel farm system before leaving pro baseball.

Ardell married writer Jean Hastings Ardell in 1981. They live in Laguna Beach, California.
