= Littleton Fowler (baseball) =

American baseball pitcher

Littleton Fowler (born c. 1941) was an American baseball pitcher who is most notable for winning the 1961 College World Series Most Outstanding Player award while a sophomore at Oklahoma State University. He was the third player from Oklahoma State University to win this award: Tom Borland (1955) and Jim Dobson (1959). In that College World Series, he pitched 23 innings over five games, allowing only 14 hits with 13 strikeouts. He is also in the Oklahoma State University Baseball Hall of Fame.

Fowler never turned pro, becoming an optometrist instead.
