= Syracuse Orangemen baseball =

Former college baseball team representing Syracuse University, New York

Syracuse Orangemen
- Founded: 1873
- Defunct: 1972
- University: Syracuse University
- Head coach: N/A
- Conference: Independent
- Location: Syracuse, New York
- Home stadium: Lew Carr Field
- Nickname: Orangemen
- Colors: Orange

College World Series appearances
- 1961

The Syracuse Orangemen baseball team was the varsity intercollegiate college baseball team of Syracuse University. The team played its home games at Star Park, the Old Oval, Hendricks Field, Lew Carr Field, and the Archbold Stadium in Syracuse, New York. The Orangemen were affiliated with the National Collegiate Athletic Association. Syracuse started a club baseball program in the early 2000s, once again bringing the club sport back to campus. The team competes in the North Atlantic West conference of the National Club Baseball Association. Syracuse is one of five universities from the NCAA Division I "Power 4" conferences (Big Ten, Big 12, ACC, and SEC) as of 2022 to not sponsor an NCAA baseball team, along with Wisconsin, Iowa State, Colorado, and SMU.

== History ==
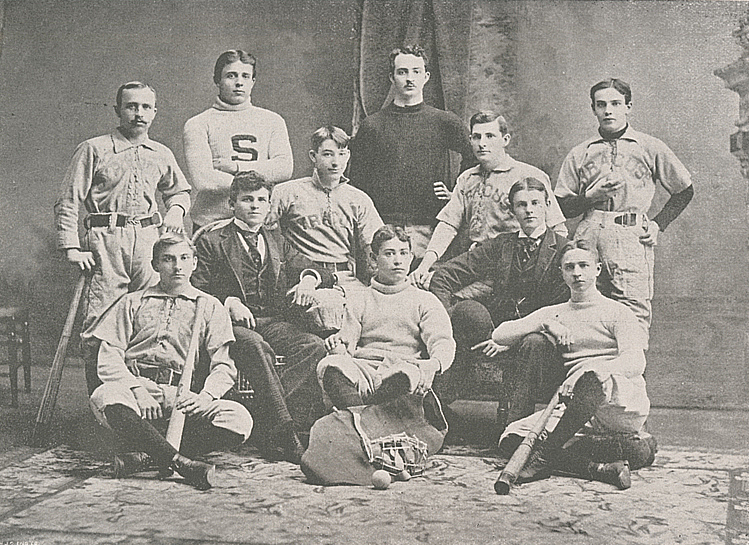
Syracuse University varsity baseball team (1894)

Syracuse fielded a varsity intercollegiate baseball team from 1873 through 1921, until the team was disbanded; and then reintroduced in the 1940s. Today the university now fields a team at the Division 2 club level. The current team captured a division title in the 2022-23 season while finishing runner-up in the New England Regional. At the height of the sport's popularity, often more than 1,000 fans attended the games. Syracuse played their home games on Lew Carr Field, named after the Orangemen's coach from 1910 to 1942, compiling a 275–268 record. The program produced 23 MLB players. The field was situated behind Manley Field House, where the lacrosse practice fields are today.

The Orangemen appeared in the 1961 College World Series, entering the College World Series with a 16–3 record. In their first game they defeated Northern Colorado 12–5, but were defeated in their next game 12–9 by Oklahoma State. They then defeated Western Michigan 6–0, before being eliminated by eventual tournament runner-up Oklahoma State 8–0. The 1961 Syracuse baseball team included two future major league pitchers, Dave Giusti and Billy Connors, and four members of the 1959 NCAA championship football team: Dave Sarette, Billy Canon, Dick Easterly, and Bob Lelli. Sarette was named as third baseman in the 1961 College World Series all-tournament team.

During the cold winter months, the team practiced in an old barn adjacent to Manley. There was a batting cage made of nets and some artificial mounds for pitchers to throw batting practice, but not much else for players to practice with while in the offseason. There was no way to work on fielding or baserunning, nor could the pitchers realistically throw live pitches to batters. Syracuse University played their last game ever against Cortland State College losing 1–0. The game was played at the AAA Syracuse Chiefs field in the spring of 1972 due to poor conditions at their home field.

The current Syracuse baseball club now practices in Manley Field House during the winter, and at a small field on Lower Hookway in nice weather.

== See also ==
- Syracuse Orange
- Syracuse Mets
