= College World Series Most Outstanding Player =

Award

Men's College World Series Most Outstanding Player
- Awarded for: Best player in the Men's College World Series
- Country: United States

History
- First award: 1949–present
- Most recent: Jaxon Willits, Oklahoma

The Men's College World Series Most Outstanding Player is an award for the best individual performance during the NCAA Division I Men's College World Series (Note: While the event's official name has been "Men's College World Series" since no later than 2008, the NCAA did not use "Men's" in the event branding until 2022.) (MCWS) in Omaha, Nebraska. The recipient of the award is announced at the completion of the MCWS Championship Series. The award is similar to Major League Baseball's World Series Most Valuable Player award. Division II introduced their own Most Outstanding Player award for their inaugural tournament in 1968 while Division III also has their own Most Outstanding Player for their baseball tournament.

Since 1999, the winner of the award has received a miniature replica of "The Road to Omaha" sculpture, which is situated at the current MCWS site of Charles Schwab Field Omaha. The award measures 16 inches high. There have been 10 recipients of this award who were on not on the winning team of the College World Series. The MCWS started in 1947 as the College World Series, but the award was not given out until 1949.

== Voting process ==
The press attending the championship series vote on the Most Outstanding Player during the second and typically deciding game. In the fifth inning, ballots are distributed. The voting is closed by the eighth inning. The Most Outstanding Player is announced following the awarding of trophies to the runner-up and championship teams. If a third game of the championship series is necessary, the ballots taken during the second game are discarded, and a new round of balloting is conducted during the third and deciding game.

== List ==
Key
Year	Links to the article about that corresponding Men's College World Series
†	Member of the College Baseball Hall of Fame
§	Indicates team did not win the series

Winners
Year	Name	Position	School
1949	Tom Hamilton	First baseman	Texas
1950	Ray Van Cleef	Outfielder	Rutgers^{§}
1951	Sidney Hatfield	Pitcher / First baseman	Tennessee^{§}
1952	James O'Neill	Pitcher	Holy Cross
1953	J. L. Smith	Pitcher	Texas^{§}
1954	Tom Yewcic	Catcher	Michigan State^{§}
1955	Tom Borland^{†}	Pitcher	Oklahoma A&M^{§}
1956	Jerry Thomas	Pitcher	Minnesota
1957	Cal Emery	Pitcher / First baseman	Penn State^{§}
1958	Bill Thom	Pitcher	Southern California
1959	Jim Dobson	Third baseman	Oklahoma State
1960	John Erickson	Second baseman	Minnesota
1961	Littleton Fowler	Pitcher	Oklahoma State^{§}
1962	Bob Garibaldi	Pitcher	Santa Clara^{§}
1963	Bud Hollowell	Catcher	Southern California
1964	Joe Ferris	Pitcher	Maine^{§}
1965	Sal Bando^{†}	Third baseman	Arizona State
1966	Steve Arlin^{†}	Pitcher	Ohio State
1967	Ron Davini	Catcher	Arizona State
1968	Bill Seinsoth	First baseman	Southern California
1969	John Dolinsek	Outfielder	Arizona State
1970	Gene Ammann	Pitcher	Florida State^{§}
1971	Jerry Tabb	First baseman	Tulsa^{§}
1972	Russ McQueen	Pitcher	Southern California
1973	Dave Winfield^{†}	Pitcher / Outfielder	Minnesota^{§}
1974	George Milke	Pitcher	Southern California
1975	Mickey Reichenbach	First baseman	Texas
1976	Steve Powers	Pitcher / Designated hitter	Arizona
1977	Bob Horner^{†}	Third baseman	Arizona State
1978	Rod Boxberger	Pitcher	Southern California
1979	Tony Hudson	Pitcher	Cal State Fullerton
1980	Terry Francona^{†}	Outfielder	Arizona
1981	Stan Holmes	Outfielder	Arizona State
1982	Dan Smith	Pitcher	Miami
1983	Calvin Schiraldi	Pitcher	Texas
1984	John Fishel	First baseman / Outfielder	Cal State Fullerton
1985	Greg Ellena	Designated hitter	Miami
1986	Mike Senne	Outfielder	Arizona
1987	Paul Carey	Outfielder	Stanford
1988	Lee Plemel	Pitcher	Stanford
1989	Greg Brummett	Pitcher	Wichita State
1990	Mike Rebhan	Pitcher	Georgia
1991	Gary Hymel	Catcher	LSU
1992	Phil Nevin	Third baseman	Cal State Fullerton^{§}
1993	Todd Walker^{†}	Second baseman	LSU
1994	Chip Glass	Outfielder	Oklahoma
1995	Mark Kotsay^{†}	Outfielder / Pitcher	Cal State Fullerton
1996	Pat Burrell	Outfielder	Miami^{§}
1997	Brandon Larson	Shortstop	LSU
1998	Wes Rachels	Second baseman	Southern California
1999	Marshall McDougall	Second baseman	Florida State^{§}
2000	Trey Hodges	Pitcher	LSU
2001	Charlton Jimerson	Outfielder	Miami
2002	Huston Street	Pitcher / Infielder	Texas
2003	John Hudgins	Pitcher	Stanford^{§}
2004	Jason Windsor	Pitcher	Cal State Fullerton
2005	David Maroul	Third baseman	Texas
2006	Jonah Nickerson	Pitcher	Oregon State
2007	Jorge Reyes	Pitcher	Oregon State
2008	Tommy Mendonca	Third baseman	Fresno State
2009	Jared Mitchell	Outfielder	LSU
2010	Jackie Bradley Jr.	Outfielder	South Carolina
2011	Scott Wingo	Second baseman	South Carolina
2012	Rob Refsnyder	Outfielder	Arizona
2013	Adam Plutko	Pitcher	UCLA
2014	Dansby Swanson	Shortstop	Vanderbilt
2015	Josh Sborz	Pitcher	Virginia
2016	Andrew Beckwith	Pitcher	Coastal Carolina
2017	Alex Faedo	Pitcher	Florida
2018	Adley Rutschman	Catcher	Oregon State
2019	Kumar Rocker	Pitcher	Vanderbilt
2020	Tournament canceled due to COVID-19 pandemic		
2021	Will Bednar	Pitcher	Mississippi State
2022	Dylan DeLucia	Pitcher	Ole Miss
2023	Paul Skenes	Pitcher	LSU
2024	Dylan Dreiling	Outfielder	Tennessee
2025	Kade Anderson	Pitcher	LSU
2026	Jaxon Willits	Shortstop	Oklahoma

== Teams ==
School	Total
USC	7
LSU	7
Arizona State	5
Cal State Fullerton	5
Texas	5
Arizona	4
Miami	4
Oklahoma State	3
Oregon State	3
Stanford	3
Florida State	2
Oklahoma	2
South Carolina	2
Tennessee	2
Vanderbilt	2
Coastal Carolina	1
Georgia	1
Holy Cross	1
Florida	1
Maine	1
Michigan State	1
Minnesota	1
Mississippi State	1
Ohio State	1
Ole Miss	1
Penn State	1
Rutgers	1
Santa Clara	1
Tulsa	1
UCLA	1
Virginia	1
Wichita State	1

== See also ==
- List of college baseball awards
