= Lawrence–Dumont Stadium =

Demolished stadium in Wichita, Kansas, US

Lawrence-Dumont Stadium
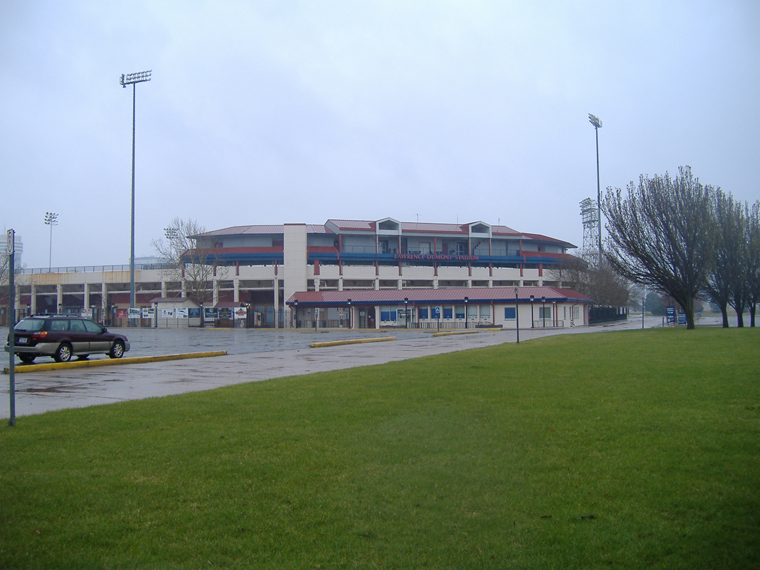
- Southwest side of stadium (2009)

- Location within Kansas
- Former names: Lawrence Stadium (1934–1978)
- Address: 300 S. Sycamore St, Wichita, Kansas 67213, United States
- Location: Bounded by McLean Blvd (east side), Maple St (south side), Sycamore St (west side)
- Coordinates: 37°40′53″N 97°20′45″W
- Capacity: 6,400 (baseball); 12,500 (football)
- Field size: Left field: 344 ft (105 m); Center field: 401 ft (122 m); Right field: 312 ft (95 m)

Construction
- Groundbreaking: March 4, 1934
- Opened: 1934
- Renovated: 2001, 2011
- Demolished: 2018

Tenants
- Wichita Aero Commandos (football) 1942; College World Series 1949; Wichita Indians (WL) 1950–1955; Wichita Braves (AA) 1956–1958; Wichita Aeros (AA) 1970–1984; Wichita Pilots/Wranglers (TL) 1987–2007; Wichita Wingnuts (AA) 2008–2018; NBC World Series 1935–2018

Lawrence–Dumont Stadium, previously known as Lawrence Stadium, was a baseball stadium in Wichita, Kansas, United States. It was located on the northwest corner of McLean Boulevard and Maple Street, along the west bank of the Arkansas River, in the Delano neighborhood of downtown Wichita. The stadium held 6,400 fans and most recently was the home field of the Wichita Wingnuts independent baseball team from 2008 until 2018, and was home to the annual National Baseball Congress World Series from 1935 until 2018.

The city of Wichita tore down the aging Lawrence-Dumont to build a new stadium on the site for the Wichita Wind Surge, who relocated from New Orleans in 2020. The new stadium is named Equity Bank Park.

== History ==
=== Previous stadiums ===
Baseball was played at other locations around Wichita in the earlier years. Island Park baseball stadium was built in 1912 on what was then Ackerman Island in the Arkansas River, north of the Douglas Street bridge. Baseball was played there from 1912 to 1933, when the stadium was torn down so the island could be removed to widen the river into one channel.

=== 20th century ===
Charles S. Lawrence, former Wichita mayor (1929, 1930, 1933, 1934) who died on September 20, 1934, after convincing the city to move the stadium and rebuild within the city limits at a location that was known as "Payne's Pasture" (owned by Charles Payne). The construction of the stadium was a Works Progress Administration (WPA) project during the Great Depression. The new stadium was named Lawrence Stadium in honor of the former mayor.

Ray "Hap" Dumont had promised to hold semi-pro games in the new ballpark. He paid Satchel Paige $1,000 to bring the Bismarck Churchills to the stadium to play in the first National Baseball Congress Championship.

In 1942, Lawrence Stadium was used for American football with the Wichita Aero Commandos, who played eight games at the ballpark. In its football configuration, the stadium was capable of holding 12,500 spectators. The field was also resodded and bleachers were erected.

In 1949, the ballpark was the last to host the College World Series before Omaha, Nebraska became its permanent address the following year.

In 1978, it was renamed to Lawrence-Dumont Stadium, adding the last name of Raymond "Hap" Dumont, who was a sports writer for The Wichita Eagle-Beacon, sports editor for the Hutchinson News, founder of the National Baseball Congress in 1935, and was instrumental in building Lawrence Stadium in Wichita.

=== 21st century ===
The stadium underwent renovations in 2001 which brought improvements to the stadium sound system, new infield turf, a new outfield fence with tables behind it, and fresh paint to the seating area.

The stadium was again renovated in 2011. It was one of the few stadiums in the world that features a natural grass outfield with an AstroTurf infield. This would change during the April 2011 renovation when the entire field (including the grass outfield) would be replaced with RamTurf. Other changes included all new lights, exterior cosmetic improvements, new infield turf, dugout expansion, and improvements to the concourse areas.

It was home to the Wichita Wranglers minor league baseball team. The Wranglers left Wichita at the end of the 2007 season and moved to Springdale, Arkansas, where the team was renamed the Northwest Arkansas Naturals. The Wichita Wingnuts of the independent American Association most recently played at Lawrence-Dumont.

In November 2018 the stadium was demolished to make room for the new Equity Bank Park.

== See also ==
- Eck Stadium at Wichita State University (northeast Wichita)

Events and tenants
Preceded by QuikTrip Park	Host of the AAB All-Star Game; Lawrence-Dumont Stadium; 2010	Succeeded by future
