= 1954 College Baseball All-America Team =

This is a list of college baseball players named first team All-Americans for the 1954 NCAA baseball season. From 1947 to 1963, the American Baseball Coaches Association was the only generally recognized All-America selector, so any player selected by the ABCA is considered a "consensus" All-American.

== Key ==
A	American Baseball Coaches Association
	Member of the National College Baseball Hall of Fame
	Consensus All-American – selected the ABCA

== All-Americans ==
Position	Name	School	#	A	Other awards and honors
Pitcher	Paul Ebert	Ohio State	1	✓	
Pitcher	Charles Heerlein	St. John's	1	✓	
Catcher	Tom Yewcic	Michigan State	1	✓	College World Series Most Outstanding Player
First baseman	Jay Dean	Oregon State	1	✓	
Second baseman	William Nolan	Seton Hall	1	✓	
Shortstop	Warren Goodrich	Stanford	1	✓	
Third baseman	John Yvars	NC State	1	✓	
Outfielder	Richard Murphy	Ohio	1	✓	
Outfielder	Jerry Schoonmaker	Missouri	1	✓	
Outfielder	Mickey Sullivan	Baylor	1	✓	

== See also ==
- List of college baseball awards
