= 1954 UMass Redmen baseball team =

American college baseball season

1954 UMass Redmen baseball

District I champion

College World Series, T-5th
- Conference: Yankee Conference
- Record: 15–7 (4–2 Yankee)
- Head coach: Earl Lorden (7th season)
- MVP: Robert Pedigree
- Home stadium: Alumni Field

The 1954 UMass Redmen baseball team represented the University of Massachusetts Amherst in the 1954 NCAA baseball season. The Redmen played their home games at Alumni Field. The team was coached by Earl Lorden in his 7th year as head coach at UMass.

The Redmen won the District I to advance to the College World Series, where they were defeated by the Missouri Tigers.

== Roster ==
1954 UMass Redmen baseball team
Players
Coaches

#	Pos.	Name	B/T	Height	Weight	Year	Home town
	P	Andy Anderson	/	—	—
		Bissonnette	/	—	—
	OF	Paul DiVincenzo	/	—	—	Sr
	INF	James Eagan	/	—	—	Jr
		Joe Faucette	/	—	—	Jr
	INF	Louis Gobeille	/	—	—	So
		Kidd	/	—	—
	P	Hugh MacKenzie	/	—	—	Sr
	OF	Norman	/	—	—
	INF	John Pasteris	/	—	—	Sr
	INF	Robert Pedigree (C)	/	—	—	Sr
	C	Raymond Rhodes	/	—	—	So
	OF	James Rivers	/	—	—
	OF	John Skypeck	/	—	—	So
	C	Ray Sutcliffe	/	—	—
	LHP	Don Swanson	/L	—	—	Sr
	RHP	Phil Tarpey	/R	—	—	Jr
	OF	Brian Wilcox	/	—	—	So
	INF	John Winters	/	—	—	So
	C	Yogi Wisniewski	/	—	—	Jr

Head coach

Earl Lorden

Assistant coach(es)

Legend

- (C) Team captain
- (S) Suspended
- (I) Ineligible
- Injured
- Current redshirt

== Schedule ==
1954 UMass Redmen baseball game log
Regular season
April (3–2)

#	Date	Opponent	Site/stadium	Score	Overall record	Yankee Record
1	April 19	at Connecticut	Gardner Dow Athletic Fields • Storrs, Connecticut	1–0	1–0	1–0
2	April 19	at Connecticut	Gardner Dow Athletic Fields • Storrs, Connecticut	1–0	2–0	2–0
3	April 24	at New Hampshire	Brackett Field • Durham, New Hampshire	0–7	2–1	2–1
4	April 24	at New Hampshire	Brackett Field • Durham, New Hampshire	4–0	3–1	3–1
5	April 29	Holy Cross	Alumni Field • Amherst, Massachusetts	0–3	3–2	3–1

May (8–3)

#	Date	Opponent	Site/stadium	Score	Overall record	Yankee Record
6	May 1	at American International	Unknown • Boston, Massachusetts	3–9	3–3	3–1
7	May 5	at Boston University	Unknown • Boston, Massachusetts	6–1	4–3	3–1
8	May 7	at Middlebury	Unknown • Middlebury, Vermont	8–5	5–3	3–1
9	May 11	at Coast Guard	Unknown • Boston, Massachusetts	2–0	6–3	3–1
10	May 12	Williams	Alumni Field • Amherst, Massachusetts	3–0	7–3	3–1
11	May 15	Tufts	Alumni Field • Amherst, Massachusetts	1–2	7–4	3–1
12	May 17	Rhode Island	Alumni Field • Amherst, Massachusetts	1–0	8–4	4–1
13	May 17	Rhode Island	Alumni Field • Amherst, Massachusetts	0–1	8–5	4–2
14	May 19	at Trinty	Unknown • Hartford, Connecticut	7–3	9–5	4–2
15	May 20	WPI	Alumni Field • Amherst, Massachusetts	4–0	10–5	4–2
16	May 31	Quonset Naval	Alumni Field • Amherst, Massachusetts	3–2	11–5	4–2

Postseason
NCAA District I Playoff (3–0)

#	Date	Opponent	Site/stadium	Score	Overall record	Yankee Record
17	June 3	at Springfield	Pynchon Park • Springfield, Massachusetts	9–7	12–5	4–2
18	June 4	vs Boston University	Pynchon Park • Springfield, Massachusetts	2–0	13–5	4–2
19	June 5	vs Amherst	Pynchon Park • Springfield, Massachusetts	2–0	14–5	4–2

College World Series (1–2)

#	Date	Opponent	Site/stadium	Score	Overall record	Yankee Record
20	June 10	vs Michigan State	Omaha Municipal Stadium • Omaha, Nebraska	5–16	14–6	4–2
21	June 11	vs Oregon	Omaha Municipal Stadium • Omaha, Nebraska	5–3	15–6	4–2
22	June 12	vs Missouri	Omaha Municipal Stadium • Omaha, Nebraska	1–8	15–7	4–2
