= 1954 Oklahoma A&M Aggies baseball team =

American baseball team

1954 Oklahoma A&M Aggies baseball

Missouri Valley champions Missouri Valley Tournament champions District VI champions

College World Series, 4th
- Conference: Missouri Valley Conference
- Record: 18–11 (8–1 MVC)
- Head coach: Toby Greene (11th season)

1954 Missouri Valley Conference baseball standings
	Conf.				Overall
Team	W		L	PCT	W		L	PCT
Saint Louis ‍‍‍	2	–	0	1.000		–		–
Oklahoma A&M ‍†‍‍^{y}	8	–	1	.889	18	–	11	.621
Houston ‍‍‍	4	–	5	.444	12	–	10	.545
Tulsa ‍‍‍	4	–	5	.444	11	–	10	.524
Wichita State ‍‍‍	2	–	7	.222	4	–	9	.308
Detroit ‍‍‍	0	–	2	.000	6	–	12	.333
† – Conference champion y – Invited to the College World Series; As of June 30, 1954; Rankings from Coaches' Poll

The 1954 Oklahoma A&M Aggies baseball team represented the Oklahoma Agricultural and Mechanical College in the 1954 NCAA baseball season. The team was coached by Toby Greene in his 11th year at Oklahoma A&M.

The Aggies won the District VI Playoff to advance to the College World Series, where they were defeated by the Missouri Tigers.

== Roster ==
1954 Oklahoma A&M Aggies baseball team
Players
Coaches

#	Pos.	Name	B/T	Height	Weight	Year	Home town
		Don Anderson	/	—	—
		Bob Andrew	/	—	—
		Fred Babb	R/	5 ft 9 in (1.75 m)	170 lb (77 kg)
		V. R. Barnhouse	/	—	—
	OF	Ronny Bennett	L/R	5 ft 8 in (1.73 m)	175 lb (79 kg)		Enid, Oklahoma
		Wayne Bennett	/	—	—
		Jack Bohl	/	—	—
		Don Booher	/	—	—
	LHP	Tom Borland	L/L	6 ft 3 in (1.91 m)	172 lb (78 kg)		McAlester, Oklahoma
		Max Bunyard	/	—	—
		Conny Burdick	/	—	—
		George Day	/	—	—
19	INF	Phil Finegan	L/L	6 ft 2 in (1.88 m)	190 lb (86 kg)		Chickasha, Oklahoma
	RHP	Kenneth Kinnamon	R/R	6 ft 4 in (1.93 m)	185 lb (84 kg)
		Jerry Patrick	/	—	—
		Harvey Romans	/	—	—
		Henry Walker	/	—	—
		Jim Walton	/	—	—
		J. B. White	/	—	—
	INF	Jim Woolard	R/R	6 ft 0 in (1.83 m)	172 lb (78 kg)		Heavener, Oklahoma

Head coach

Toby Greene

Assistant coach(es)

Legend

- (C) Team captain
- (S) Suspended
- (I) Ineligible
- Injured
- Current redshirt

Roster
Last update: February 9, 2021

== Schedule ==
1954 Oklahoma A&M Aggies baseball game log
Regular season
March (2–2)

#	Date	Opponent	Site/stadium	Score	Overall record	MVC record
1	March 26	at Sam Houston State	Unknown • Huntsville, Texas	3–4	0–1	–
2	March 27	at Sam Houston State	Unknown • Huntsville, Texas	4–5	0–2	–
3	March 29	at Rice	Rice Baseball Field • Houston, Texas	12–3	1–2	–
4	March 30	at Rice	Rice Baseball Field • Houston, Texas	10–0	2–2	–

April (7–3)

#	Date	Opponent	Site/stadium	Score	Overall record	MVC record
5	April 3	Oklahoma	•	6–13	2–3	–
6	April 5	Tulsa	•	23–4	3–3	1–0
7	April 16	Missouri	•	5–3	4–3	1–0
8	April 17	Missouri	•	6–12	4–4	1–0
9	April 19	Tulsa	•	13–7	5–4	2–0
10	April 19	Tulsa	•	16–6	6–4	3–0
11	April 23	Houston	•	4–14	6–5	3–1
12	April 24	Houston	•	6–0	7–5	4–1
13	April 24	Houston	•	11–7	8–5	5–1
14	April 30	at Wichita State	McAdams Field • Wichita, Kansas	7–1	9–5	6–1

May (3–3)

#	Date	Opponent	Site/stadium	Score	Overall record	MVC record
15	May 1	at Wichita State	McAdams Field • Wichita, Kansas	7–3	10–5	7–1
16	May 1	at Wichita State	McAdams Field • Wichita, Kansas	14–5	11–5	8–1
17	May 3	Oklahoma	•	6–4	12–5	8–1
18	May 4	Oklahoma	•	2–4	12–6	8–1
19	May 7	at Nebraska	Husker Diamond • Lincoln, Nebraska	4–9	12–7	8–1
20	May 7	at Nebraska	Husker Diamond • Lincoln, Nebraska	1–3	12–8	8–1

Postseason
Missouri Valley Conference Tournament (2–0)

#	Date	Opponent	Site/stadium	Score	Overall record	MVC record
21	May	Saint Louis	•	7–2	13–8	8–1
22	May	Saint Louis	•	9–1	14–8	8–1

District VI Playoff (2–1)

#	Date	Opponent	Site/stadium	Score	Overall record	MVC record
23	May 31	at Texas	Clark Field • Austin, Texas	7–6	15–8	8–1
24	June 1	at Texas	Clark Field • Austin, Texas	3–6	15–9	8–1
25	June 2	at Texas	Clark Field • Austin, Texas	16–12	16–9	8–1

College World Series (2–2)

#	Date	Opponent	Site/stadium	Score	Overall record	Pac-10 record
26	June 10	vs Rollins	Omaha Municipal Stadium • Omaha, Nebraska	5–9	16–10	8–1
27	June 11	vs Lafayette	Omaha Municipal Stadium • Omaha, Nebraska	4–2	17–10	8–1
28	June 12	vs Arizona	Omaha Municipal Stadium • Omaha, Nebraska	5–4	18–10	8–1
29	June 13	vs Missouri	Omaha Municipal Stadium • Omaha, Nebraska	3–7	18–11	8–1
