= 1954 NCAA baseball tournament =

American college sports championship

- Season: 1954
- Teams: 24
- Finals site: Johnny Rosenblatt Stadium; Omaha, NE
- Champions: Missouri (1st title)
- Runner-up: Rollins (1st CWS Appearance)
- Winning coach: Hi Simmons (1st title)
- MOP: Tom Yewcic (Michigan State)

The 1954 NCAA baseball tournament was played at the end of the 1954 NCAA baseball season to determine the national champion of college baseball. The tournament concluded with eight teams competing in the College World Series, a double-elimination tournament in its eighth year. Eight regional districts sent representatives to the College World Series, but for the first time the preliminary tournament rounds hosted by each district were sanctioned NCAA events. These events would later become known as regionals. Each district had its own format for selecting teams, resulting in 24 teams participating in the tournament at the conclusion of their regular season, and in some cases, after a conference tournament. The College World Series was held in Omaha, Nebraska from June 10 to June 16. The eighth tournament's champion was Missouri, coached by John "Hi" Simmons. The Most Outstanding Player was Tom Yewcic of Michigan State.

== Tournament ==
=== District 1 ===
Games played in Springfield, Massachusetts.

Semifinals
UMass	9^{10}
Springfield	7
Boston University	8
Holy Cross	3

Finals
UMass	2
Boston University	0

=== District 2 ===
Games played at Allentown, Pennsylvania.

Semifinals
St. John's	4
Navy	2
Lafayette	4
Villanova	3

Finals
St. John's (NY)	0
Lafayette	9

=== District 3 ===
District 3 consisted of two separate 3-game series. The first series was played between Virginia Tech and Clemson, with the winner moving on to play Rollins in a three-game series. The winner of that series moved on to the College World Series.

- In the semifinal series, the first game was played in Clemson, South Carolina, and the second game was played in Blacksburg, Virginia. Both final series games were played in Winter Park, Florida.

Semifinal				Final
				Virginia Tech	0	3	–
Virginia Tech	11	7	–	Rollins	3	9	–
Clemson	10	1	–

=== District 4 ===
District 4 consisted of two separate 3 game series'. The first series was played between Ohio and Ashland, with the winner moving on to play Michigan St. in a three-game series. The winner of that series moved on to the College World Series.

- Games played at Athens, Ohio.

Semifinal				Final
				Ohio	10	7^{7}	3
Ashland	4	6	–	Michigan State	14	0	5^{5}
Ohio	18	10^{7}	–

=== District 5 ===
- Missouri (Automatic College World Series qualifier)

=== District 6 ===
Games played at Austin, Texas.

District 6 Series
Oklahoma State	6	12	7
Texas	3	16	6

=== District 7 ===
Games played at Greeley, Colorado.

Game 1
Arizona	8
Colorado State College	2

Game 2
Colorado State College	21
Wyoming	14

Game 3
Arizona	16
Wyoming	9

Final
Arizona	8^{11}
Colorado State College	5

=== District 8 ===
Games played at Eugene, Oregon.

First Round
Oregon	9
Seattle	4
Fresno State	9
Southern California	3
Lower round 1
Seattle	0
Southern California	9

Semi-Finals
Oregon	9
Fresno State	5
Lower final
Fresno State	7
Southern California	4

Finals
Oregon	1^{5}	—
Fresno State	0	—

== College World Series ==
=== Participants ===
School	Conference	Record (conference)	Head coach	CWS appearances	CWS best finish	CWS record
Arizona	Border	39–7 (2–0)	Frank Sancet	0 (last: none)	none	0–0
Lafayette	Independent	16–6	Charlie Gelbert	1 (last: 1953)	3rd (1953)	3–2
UMass	Yankee	14–5 (4–2)	Earl Lorden	0 (last: none)	none	0–0
Michigan State	Big 10	22–8–1 (11–2)	John Kobs	0 (last: none)	none	0–0
Missouri	Big Seven	17–3 (11–1)	Hi Simmons	1 (last: 1952)	2nd (1952)	3–2
Oklahoma A&M	MVC	16–9 (8–1)	Toby Greene	0 (last: none)	none	0–0
Oregon	PCC	18–6 (11–5)	Don Kirsch	0 (last: none)	none	0–0
Rollins	Independent	22–6	Joe Justice	0 (last: none)	none	0–0

=== Results ===
==== Bracket ====
Upper round 1
Michigan State	16
UMass	5
Arizona	12
Oregon	1
Rollins	9^{11}
Oklahoma A&M	5
Missouri	5
Lafayette	3

Upper round 2
Michigan State	2
Arizona	1
Rollins	4
Missouri	1
Lower round 1
UMass	5
Oregon	3
Oklahoma A&M	4
Lafayette	2

Upper final
Michigan State	4
Rollins	5
Lower round 2
Missouri	8
UMass	1
Arizona	4
Oklahoma A&M	5^{14}

Semifinals
Rollins	2
Michigan State	3^{10}
Missouri	7
Oklahoma A&M	3

Preliminary final
Michigan State	3
Missouri	4

Final
Rollins	1
Missouri	4

==== Game results ====
Date	Game	Winner	Score	Loser	Notes
June 10	Game 1	Michigan State	16–5	UMass	
June 10	Game 2	Arizona	12–1	Oregon	
June 11	Game 3	Rollins	9–5 (11)	Oklahoma A&M	
June 10	Game 4	Missouri	5–3	Lafayette	
June 11	Game 5	UMass	5–3	Oregon	Oregon eliminated
June 11	Game 6	Oklahoma A&M	4–2	Lafayette	Lafayette eliminated
June 11	Game 7	Michigan State	2–1	Arizona	
June 11	Game 8	Rollins	4–1	Missouri	
June 12	Game 9	Missouri	8–1	UMass	UMass eliminated
June 12	Game 10	Oklahoma A&M	5–4 (14)	Arizona	Arizona eliminated
June 12	Game 11	Rollins	5–4	Michigan State	
June 13	Game 12	Missouri	7–3	Oklahoma A&M	Oklahoma A&M eliminated
June 13	Game 13	Michigan State	3–2 (10)	Rollins	
June 14	Game 14	Missouri	4–3	Michigan State	Michigan State eliminated
June 16	Final	Missouri	4–1	Rollins	Missouri wins CWS

=== Notable players ===
- Arizona: Don Gile, Don Lee, Carl Thomas
- Lafayette:
- UMass:
- Michigan State: Bob Anderson, Ed Hobaugh, Jack Kralick, Leroy Powell, George Smith, Bill Stewart, Tom Yewcic
- Missouri: Jay Hankins, Jerry Schoonmaker, Norm Stewart
- Oklahoma A&M: Tom Borland
- Oregon: George Shaw
- Rollins:
