= 1954 Michigan State Spartans baseball team =

American college baseball season

1954 Michigan State Spartans baseball

Big Ten Conference

College World Series, 3rd
- Conference: Big Ten Conference
- Record: 25–10–1 (11–2–1 Big Ten)
- Head coach: John Kobs (29th season)
- Assistant coach: Frank Pellerin
- Captain: Jack Zeitler
- Home stadium: Old College Field

1954 Big Ten Conference baseball standings
	Conf.						Overall
Team	W		L		T	PCT	W		L		T	PCT
Michigan State ‍†‍‍^{y}	11	–	2	–	0	.846	25	–	10	–	0	.714
Wisconsin ‍‍‍	10	–	3	–	0	.769	17	–	7	–	1	.700
Ohio State ‍‍‍	10	–	5	–	0	.667	20	–	11	–	0	.645
Michigan ‍‍‍	10	–	5	–	0	.667	22	–	9	–	0	.710
Northwestern ‍‍‍	7	–	6	–	0	.538	15	–	11	–	0	.577
Minnesota ‍‍‍	6	–	9	–	0	.400	17	–	14	–	0	.548
Iowa ‍‍‍	5	–	10	–	0	.333	10	–	15	–	1	.404
Indiana ‍‍‍	4	–	9	–	0	.308	12	–	14	–	0	.462
Purdue ‍‍‍	4	–	11	–	0	.267	13	–	13	–	0	.500
Illinois ‍‍‍	4	–	11	–	0	.267	16	–	15	–	0	.516
† – Conference champion y – Invited to the NCAA tournament As of June 30, 1954; Rankings from Collegiate Baseball

The 1954 Michigan State Spartans baseball team represented Michigan State University in the 1954 NCAA baseball season. The head coach was John Kobs, serving his 29th year. The Spartans finished the season in 3rd place in the 1954 College World Series.

== Roster ==
1954 Michigan State Spartans baseball team
Players
Coaches

#	Pos.	Name	B/T	Height	Weight	Year	Home town
	OF	Chuck Bodary	/	—	—
		Dan Brown	/	—	—
	OF	Ray Collard	/	—	—
	P	Ernie Erickson	/	—	—
	P	Walter Godfrey	/	—	—
	P	Charles Gorman	/	—	—
	RHP	Ed Hobaugh	R/R	6 ft 0 in (1.83 m)	176 lb (80 kg)		Kittanning, Pennsylvania
		Bill Hopping	/	—	—
	RHP	Dick Idzkowski	R/R	6 ft 3 in (1.91 m)	190 lb (86 kg)
	INF	Chuck Matthews	/	—	—
		William Mansfield	/	—	—
		John Matsock	/	—	—
	C	Don Moffett	/	—	—
	INF	Earl Morrall	/	—	—
	OF	John Polomsky	/	—	—
	RHP	Leroy Powell	R/R	6 ft 1 in (1.85 m)	190 lb (86 kg)		Flint, Michigan
	OF	Jack Risch	/	—	—
		Bud Rollier	/	—	—
	OF	Jim Sack	/	—	—
	INF	George Smith	/	—	—
		Ron Stead	/	—	—
	RHP	Mike Wallace	R/R	6 ft 1 in (1.85 m)	165 lb (75 kg)
		Jack Wenner	/	—	—
	INF	Bob Williams	/	—	—
	C	Tom Yewcic	R/R	5 ft 11 in (1.8 m)	180 lb (82 kg)		East Conemaugh, Pennsylvania
	INF	Jack Zeitler	/	—	—

Head coach

John Kobs

Assistant coach(es)

Frank Pellerin

Legend

- (C) Team captain
- (S) Suspended
- (I) Ineligible
- Injured
- Current redshirt

== Schedule ==
1954 Michigan State Spartans baseball game log
Regular season
March (2–2)

#	Date	Opponent	Site/stadium	Score	Overall record	Big Ten record
1	March 26	at Duke	Jack Coombs Field • Durham, North Carolina	3–6	0–1	0–0
2	March 27	at Duke	Jack Coombs Field • Durham, North Carolina	8–2	1–1	0–0
3	March 29	at North Carolina	Emerson Field • Chapel Hill, North Carolina	2–6	1–2	0–0
4	March 30	at NC State	Riddick Stadium • Raleigh, North Carolina	5–3	2–2	0–0

April (5–2–1)

#	Date	Opponent	Site/stadium	Score	Overall record	Big Ten record
5	April 2	at Fort Eustis	Unknown • Newport News, Virginia	4–12	2–3	0–0
6	April 3	at Fort Eustis	Unknown • Newport News, Virginia	4–5	2–4	0–0
7	April 3	at Fort Eustis	Unknown • Newport News, Virginia	4–0	3–4	0–0
8	April 17	Wayne State	Old College Field • East Lansing, Michigan	4–2	4–4	0–0
9	April 21	Detroit	Old College Field • East Lansing, Michigan	9–3	5–4	0–0
10	April 23	at Northwestern	Rocky Miller Park • Evanston, Illinois	4–0	6–4	1–0
11	April 24	at Wisconsin	Guy Lowman Field • Madison, Wisconsin	3–3	6–4–1	1–0–1
12	April 30	Illinois	Old College Field • East Lansing, Michigan	17–3	7–4–1	2–0–1

May (13–2)

#	Date	Opponent	Site/stadium	Score	Overall record	Big Ten record
13	May 1	Purdue	Old College Field • East Lansing, Michigan	12–0	8–4–1	3–0–1
14	May 1	Purdue	Old College Field • East Lansing, Michigan	2–5	8–5–1	3–1–1
15	May 5	Notre Dame	Old College Field • East Lansing, Michigan	8–1	9–5–1	3–1–1
16	May 7	at Iowa	Unknown • Iowa City, Iowa	6–3	10–5–1	4–1–1
17	May 8	at Minnesota	Delta Field • Minneapolis, Minnesota	8–5	11–5–1	5–1–1
18	May 8	at Minnesota	Delta Field • Minneapolis, Minnesota	6–2	12–5–1	6–1–1
19	May 14	Michigan	Old College Field • East Lansing, Michigan	6–4	13–5–1	7–1–1
20	May 15	at Michigan	Ray Fisher Stadium • Ann Arbor, Michigan	8–4	14–5–1	8–1–1
21	May 15	at Michigan	Ray Fisher Stadium • Ann Arbor, Michigan	8–9	14–6–1	8–2–1
22	May 19	at Wayne State	Unknown • Detroit, Michigan	6–2	15–6–1	8–2–1
23	May 21	Indiana	Old College Field • East Lansing, Michigan	5–2	16–6–1	9–2–1
24	May 22	Ohio State	Old College Field • East Lansing, Michigan	6–4	17–6–1	10–2–1
25	May 22	Ohio State	Old College Field • East Lansing, Michigan	6–5	18–6–1	11–2–1
26	May 26	at Notre Dame	Unknown • Notre Dame, Indiana	6–4	19–6–1	11–2–1
27	May 29	at Detroit	Unknown • Detroit, Michigan	6–3	20–6–1	11–2–1

Postseason
District 4 Tournament (2–1)

#	Date	Opponent	Site/stadium	Score	Overall record	Big Ten record
28	May 31	Ohio	Old College Field • East Lansing, Michigan	14–10	21–6–1	11–2–1
29	May 31	Ohio	Old College Field • East Lansing, Michigan	0–7	21–7–1	11–2–1
30	June 1	Ohio	Old College Field • East Lansing, Michigan	5–3	22–7–1	11–2–1

June (0–1)

#	Date	Opponent	Site/stadium	Score	Overall record	Big Ten record
31	June 5	Western Michigan	Old College Field • East Lansing, Michigan	4–5	22–8–1	11–2–1

1954 College World Series (3–2)

#	Date	Opponent	Site/stadium	Score	Overall record	Big Ten record
32	June 10	vs Massachusetts	Omaha Municipal Stadium • Omaha, Nebraska	16–5	23–8–1	11–2–1
33	June 11	vs Arizona	Omaha Municipal Stadium • Omaha, Nebraska	2–1	24–8–1	11–2–1
34	June 12	vs Rollins	Omaha Municipal Stadium • Omaha, Nebraska	4–5	24–9–1	11–2–1
35	June 13	vs Rollins	Omaha Municipal Stadium • Omaha, Nebraska	3–2	25–9–1	11–2–1
36	June 14	vs Missouri	Omaha Municipal Stadium • Omaha, Nebraska	3–4	25–10–1	11–2–1
