= 1954 Arizona Wildcats baseball team =

American university baseball season

1954 Arizona Wildcats baseball

District VII champions

College World Series, T-5th
- Conference: Border Conference
- Record: 40–9 (2–0 Border)
- Head coach: Frank Sancet (5th season)
- Home stadium: UA Field

The 1954 Arizona Wildcats baseball team represented the University of Arizona in the 1954 NCAA baseball season. The Wildcats played their home games at UA Field. The team was coached by Frank Sancet in his 5th year at Arizona.

The Wildcats won the District VII Playoff to advance to the College World Series, where they were defeated by the Oklahoma A&M Cowboys.

== Roster ==
1954 Arizona Wildcats baseball team
Players
Coaches

#	Pos.	Name	B/T	Height	Weight	Year	Home town
	OF	Eddie Aros	/R	—	—	Sr
	LHP	Marcel Bachelier	/L	—	—	Jr
	INF	Rudy Castro	/R	—	—	Jr	Tucson, Arizona
		Bill Codd	/	—	—
		Jack Davis	/	—	—	So
		Glen Festin	/	—	—
		Don Gile	R/R	6 ft 6 in (1.98 m)	220 lb (100 kg)	Jr
		Jay Goodford	/	—	—
35	INF	Russ Gragg	L/R	6 ft 1 in (1.85 m)	175 lb (79 kg)	Jr
		Dick Griesser	/	—	—	So
		Hadley Hicks	/	—	—
		Ted Lazovich	/	—	—
	RHP	Don Lee	R/R	6 ft 4 in (1.93 m)	205 lb (93 kg)	So
	INF	Huge McMullan	/R	—	—	Sr
	RHP	Eddie Moraga	/R	—	—	Sr
		Homer Myers	/	—	—	So
		Loren Oliver	/	—	—
		Earnest Oosterveen	/	—	—	So
		Vincent Pellinto	/	—	—
	RHP	Bennie Rincon	/R	—	—
		Gerald Rutledge	/	—	—
	OF	Gus Stiles	/	—	—	Jr
	RHP	Carl Thomas	R/R	6 ft 5 in (1.96 m)	245 lb (111 kg)	So	Minneapolis, Minnesota
		Jerry Tolle	/	—	—	Jr
		Tom Tomooka	/	—	—
		Joel Valdez	/	—	—
		Jack Watson	/	—	—
	INF	Tom Wright	/R	—	—
	C	Sam Zivkovich	/R	—	—

Head coach

45 Frank Sancet

Assistant coach(es)

Legend

- (C) Team captain
- (S) Suspended
- (I) Ineligible
- Injured
- Current redshirt

== Schedule ==
1954 Arizona Wildcats baseball game log
Regular season
March (12–2)

#	Date	Opponent	Site/stadium	Score	Overall record	Border Record
1	March 1	Sul Ross	UA Field • Tucson, Arizona	11–4	1–0	–
2	March 2	Sul Ross	UA Field • Tucson, Arizona	2–4	1–1	–
3	March 5	UCLA	UA Field • Tucson, Arizona	12–1	2–1	–
4	March 6	UCLA	UA Field • Tucson, Arizona	15–3	3–1	–
5	March 13	Luke Air Force Base	UA Field • Tucson, Arizona	16–0	4–1	–
6	March 13	Luke Air Force Base	UA Field • Tucson, Arizona	16–3	5–1	–
7	March 17	Davis–Monthan Air Force Base	UA Field • Tucson, Arizona	16–0	6–1	–
8	March 19	at New Mexico A&M	Unknown • Las Cruces, New Mexico	16–0	7–1	1–0
9	March 20	at New Mexico A&M	Unknown • Las Cruces, New Mexico	30–1	8–1	2–0
10	March 25	Utah	UA Field • Tucson, Arizona	10–2	9–1	2–0
11	March 25	Utah	UA Field • Tucson, Arizona	6–5	10–1	2–0
12	March 26	Utah	UA Field • Tucson, Arizona	4–12	10–2	2–0
13	March 26	Utah	UA Field • Tucson, Arizona	10–1	11–2	2–0
14	March 29	Davis–Monthan Air Force Base	UA Field • Tucson, Arizona	2–1	12–2	2–0

April (20–5)

#	Date	Opponent	Site/stadium	Score	Overall record	Border Record
15	April 1	Marine Corps Base Camp Pendleton	UA Field • Tucson, Arizona	10–14	12–3	2–0
16	April 2	Marine Corps Base Camp Pendleton	UA Field • Tucson, Arizona	25–5	13–3	2–0
17	April 3	Luke Air Force Base	UA Field • Tucson, Arizona	7–6	14–3	2–0
18	April 3	Luke Air Force Base	UA Field • Tucson, Arizona	7–3	15–3	2–0
19	April 5	Wyoming	UA Field • Tucson, Arizona	12–7	16–3	2–0
20	April 6	Wyoming	UA Field • Tucson, Arizona	21–3	17–3	2–0
21	April 7	Wyoming	UA Field • Tucson, Arizona	7–0	18–3	2–0
22	April 8	San Diego Naval Air Station	UA Field • Tucson, Arizona	5–15	18–4	2–0
23	April 9	Pacific	UA Field • Tucson, Arizona	25–5	19–4	2–0
24	April 10	Pacific	UA Field • Tucson, Arizona	8–1	20–4	2–0
25	April 12	Iowa	UA Field • Tucson, Arizona	4–3	21–4	2–0
26	April 13	Iowa	UA Field • Tucson, Arizona	2–3	21–5	2–0
27	April 14	Iowa	UA Field • Tucson, Arizona	6–5	22–5	2–0
28	April 16	Iowa	UA Field • Tucson, Arizona	17–9	23–5	2–0
29	April 17	Iowa	UA Field • Tucson, Arizona	6–5	24–5	2–0
30	April 17	Iowa	UA Field • Tucson, Arizona	1–13	24–6	2–0
31	April 19	at Pepperdine	UA Field • Malibu, California	15–4	25–6	2–0
32	April 20	at UCLA	Joe E. Brown Field • Los Angeles, California	2–1	26–6	2–0
33	April 21	at San Diego State	Unknown • San Diego, California	3–1	27–6	2–0
34	April 22	Marine Recreation Department	UA Field • Tucson, Arizona	2–3	27–7	2–0
35	April 23	Naval Air Skyraiders	UA Field • Tucson, Arizona	9–4	28–7	2–0
36	April 24	Naval Training Center	UA Field • Tucson, Arizona	2–1	29–7	2–0
37	April 24	Naval Training Center	UA Field • Tucson, Arizona	6–4	30–7	2–0
38	April 29	Naval Training Center	UA Field • Tucson, Arizona	16–5	31–7	2–0
39	April 30	Marine Recreation Department	UA Field • Tucson, Arizona	8–7	32–7	2–0

May (4–0)

#	Date	Opponent	Site/stadium	Score	Overall record	Border Record
40	May 1	Marine Recreation Department	UA Field • Tucson, Arizona	11–4	33–7	2–0
41	May 3	Davis–Monthan Air Force Base	UA Field • Tucson, Arizona	12–4	34–7	2–0
42	May 11	Davis–Monthan Air Force Base	UA Field • Tucson, Arizona	10–7	35–7	2–0
43	May 11	Davis–Monthan Air Force Base	UA Field • Tucson, Arizona	4–3	36–7	2–0

Postseason
NCAA District VII Playoff (3–0)

#	Date	Opponent	Site/stadium	Score	Overall record	Border Record
44	June 4	at Colorado State	Jackson Field • Greeley, Colorado	8–2	37–7	2–0
45	June 5	vs Wyoming	Jackson Field • Greeley, Colorado	16–9	38–7	2–0
46	June 7	at Colorado State	Jackson Field • Greeley, Colorado	8–5	39–7	2–0

College World Series (1–2)

#	Date	Opponent	Site/stadium	Score	Overall record	Border Record
47	June 10	vs Oregon	Omaha Municipal Stadium • Omaha, Nebraska	12–1	40–7	2–0
48	June 11	vs Michigan State	Johnny Rosenblatt Stadium • Omaha, Nebraska	1–2	40–8	2–0
49	June 11	vs Oklahoma A&M	Johnny Rosenblatt Stadium • Omaha, Nebraska	4–5	40–9	2–0

== Awards and honors ==
Russ Gragg

Second Team All-American American Baseball Coaches Association

Carl Thomas

Third Team All-American American Baseball Coaches Association
