= Bob Musgrave =

American athlete (1934–2012)

- Outfielder
- Born: January 7, 1934; Columbia, Missouri, US
- Died: June 17, 2012 (aged 78); Hoboken, New Jersey, US
- Batted: Left Threw: Left
- Stats at Baseball Reference

Career highlights and awards
- College World Series champion (1954)

Robert I. Musgrave (January 7, 1934 – June 17, 2012) was an American college football and college baseball player at the University of Missouri, most notable for being an outfielder on the 1954 College World Series championship team. Listed at 6 feet 0 inches (1.83 m) and 170 pounds (77 kg), he batted and threw left-handed.

== Biography ==
Musgrave grew up in Columbia, Missouri, earning high school All-American honors as a quarterback while leading David H. Hickman High School to a state championship.

In college, Musgrave was a member of the Missouri Tigers baseball and Missouri Tigers football teams. With the 1954 baseball team, he hit .418 and earned All-District V honors, as the team went on to win the 1954 College World Series.

In 1956, Musgrave signed with the Baltimore Orioles. He played one season of minor league baseball, spending time with the Aberdeen Pheasants, Lubbock Hubbers, and San Antonio Missions. Baseball records show he played in a total of 72 games that season, compiling a .241 batting average with five home runs.

Musgrave's professional baseball career came to a close when he was called into service by the United States Air Force; he served from 1956 to 1961 as a pilot with the Strategic Air Command. He died on June 17, 2012, at his home in Hoboken, New Jersey.
