= Sancet =

Sancet is a surname. Notable people with the surname include:

- Frank Sancet (1907–1985), American baseball coach and catcher
- Oihan Sancet (born 2000), Spanish football midfielder

== See also ==
- Jerry Kindall Field at Frank Sancet Stadium, former ballpark in Tucson, Arizona, U.S.
