= List of Arizona Wildcats head baseball coaches =

This is a list of Arizona Wildcats head baseball coaches. The Arizona Wildcats baseball program is a college baseball team that represents the University of Arizona in the Pac-12 Conference in the National Collegiate Athletic Association. The team has seen 17 individuals hold the head coach position since it started playing organized baseball in the 1904 season. 3 of these coaches had non-consecutive tenures.

Since 1950 - which the university considers the beginning of its modern baseball program - only six people have held the position.

The current coach is Chip Hale, who helmed his first season in 2022.

Having served for 33 seasons, J.F. "Pop" McKale is the longest tenured coach in program history. Jerry Kindall holds the record for wins at 860. Kindall won 3 College World Series titles while in Tucson, and Andy Lopez won 1. Frank Sancet, Jerry Kindall and Andy Lopez have all been inducted into the National College Baseball Hall of Fame.

== Key ==
General
#	Number of coaches (Note: A running total of the number of head coaches.)
GC	Games coached
†	Elected to the National College Baseball Hall of Fame

Overall
OW	Wins
OL	Losses
OT	Ties
O%	Winning percentage

Conference (Note: The Wildcats played as part of the Border Conference from 1931 until joining the Western Athletic Conference in 1962. Border Conference records are incomplete, and are not included in this table. Arizona joined the Pacific-10 Conference in 1978, which became the Pac-12 Conference after the addition of Utah and Colorado in 2011.)
CW	Wins
CL	Losses
CT	Ties
C%	Winning percentage

Postseason (Note: Postseason play involving the NCAA Division I Baseball Championship.)
PA	Total Appearances (Note: Postseason appearances include seasons with NCAA Division I Baseball Championship bids since the tournament began in 1947.)
PW	Total Wins
PL	Total Losses
WA	College World Series appearances (Note: College World Series appearances include seasons with CWS bids since the tournament began in 1947.)
WW	College World Series wins
WL	College World Series losses

Championships
CC	Conference regular season
CT	Conference tournament (Note: The Western Athletic Conference hosted a Best-of-3 Playoff between division champions from 1963-1981. The Pac-12 Conference introduced a Tournament in 2022.)

== Coaches ==
List of head baseball coaches showing season(s) coached, overall records, conference records, postseason records, championships and selected awards*Statistics correct as of the end of the 2019 NCAA Division I baseball season
#	Name	Term	GC	OW	OL	OT	O%	CW	CL	CT	C%	PA	PW	PL	WA	WW	WL	CCs	CTs	NCs	Awards (Note: National, regional and conference coach of the year awards.)
1	B.L. Cosgrave	1904	7	6	1	0	.857	—	—	—	—	—	—	—	—	—	—	—	—	—	—
2	R. Newton	1905, 1907	13	7	6	0	.538	—	—	—	—	—	—	—	—	—	—	—	—	—	—
3	B.R. Hatcher	1906, 1908	14	12	2	0	.857	—	—	—	—	—	—	—	—	—	—	—	—	—	—
4	Dan Farrish	1909	12	8	4	0	.667	—	—	—	—	—	—	—	—	—	—	—	—	—	—
5	R. Rigg	1910	7	2	5	0	.286	—	—	—	—	—	—	—	—	—	—	—	—	—	—
6	William Honley	1911	6	2	4	0	.333	—	—	—	—	—	—	—	—	—	—	—	—	—	—
7	Joe Collins	1912	11	7	4	0	.636	—	—	—	—	—	—	—	—	—	—	—	—	—	—
8	R.L. Quigley	1913	1	1	0	0	1.000	—	—	—	—	—	—	—	—	—	—	—	—	—	—
9	C.R. Stewart	1914	8	4	4	0	.500	—	—	—	—	—	—	—	—	—	—	—	—	—	—
10	Pop McKale	1915–1919, 1922–1949	384	257	119	8	.669	—	—	—	—	—	—	—	—	—	—	—	—	0	—
11	W.A. Porter	1920–1921	23	18	5	0	.783	—	—	—	—	—	—	—	—	—	—	—	—	—	—
12	Frank Sancet†	1950–1972	1,122	831	283	8	.741	83	62	0	.572	16	41	35	9	17	18	4	3	0	—
13	Jerry Kindall†	1973–1996	1,446	860	579	7	.595	326	320	1	.504	12	39	21	5	15	7	4	4	3	1976, 1980, 1986 National Coach of the Year 1980, 1989, 1992 Pac-10 South Coach of the Year
14	Jerry Stitt	1997–2001	282	157	125	0	.557	58	74	0	.439	1	0	2	0	0	0	0	—	0	—
15	Andy Lopez†	2002–2015	815	490	324	1	.601	186	183	0	.504	8	28	15	2	6	2	1	—	1	2012 National Coach of the Year 2012 Pac-12 Coach of the Year
16	Jay Johnson	2016–2021	322	208	114	0	.646	82	67	0	.550	3	17	9	2	5	5	1	—	0	2016 National Coach of the Year 2021 Pac-12 Coach of the Year
17	Chip Hale	2022– Present	121	72	49	0	.595	28	32	0	.467	2	2	2	0	0	0	0	0	0	—
