= Jeff Ishbia Field at McLane Stadium =

College stadium, East Lansing

Coordinates: 42°43′56″N 84°29′18″W

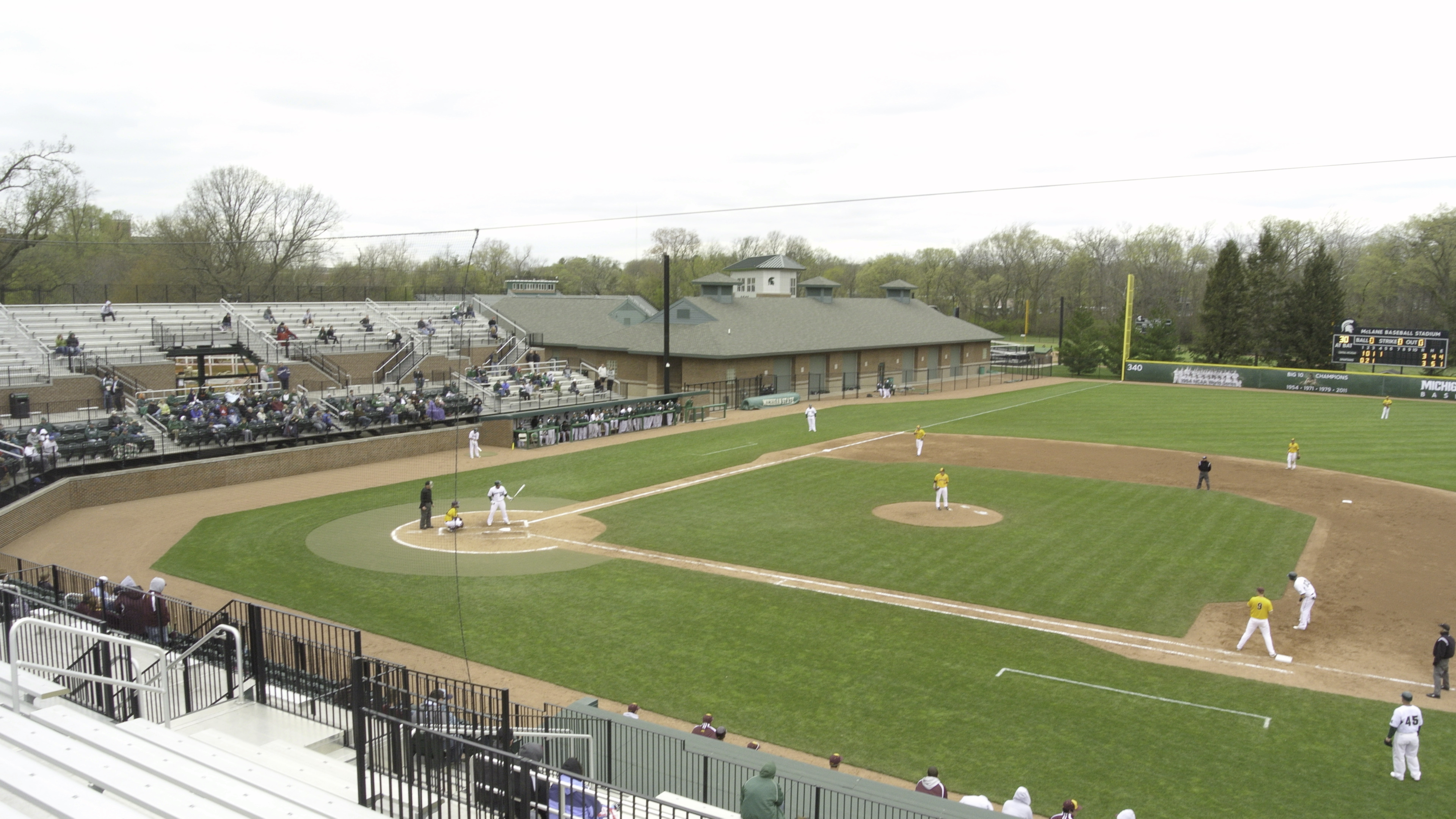
- The stadium during a game in 2012
- Interactive map of Jeff Ishbia Field at McLane Stadium
- Former names: Old College Field (1902–1969); Drayton McLane Baseball Stadium at John H. Kobs Field (1969–2024)
- Location: East Lansing, Michigan
- Owner: Michigan State University
- Operator: Michigan State University
- Capacity: 2,500
- Field size: Center Field - 400 ft Right Field - 301

Construction
- Groundbreaking: 1900
- Opened: April 18, 1902
- Renovated: 2006; April, 2009
- Cost: $4.3 million (2009 reconstruction)

Tenant
- Michigan State Spartans baseball team

Jeff Ishbia Field at McLane Stadium is a college baseball stadium in East Lansing, Michigan. The stadium holds roughly 4,600 people. It is located on a floodplain on the inside of a bend in the Red Cedar River known traditionally as Old College Field (opened in 1902) and is the home field for the Michigan State University Spartans college baseball team. The facility received a $4.3 million renovation in 2009.

The stadium facility is named after former Houston Astros owner and Michigan State alumnus Drayton McLane Jr., whose donation in 2008 allowed for the renovation of the new facility. The field, formerly named after MSU baseball coach John Kobs, was renamed for Jeff Ishbia in September 2024, following a $10 million donation to the school from his son, Justin Ishbia, and daughter-in-law.

The first official game in the newly renovated stadium was played on April 4, 2009. Spartan pitcher Nolan Moody threw a no-hitter against Northwestern University. It marked MSU's first no-hitter in 16 years.

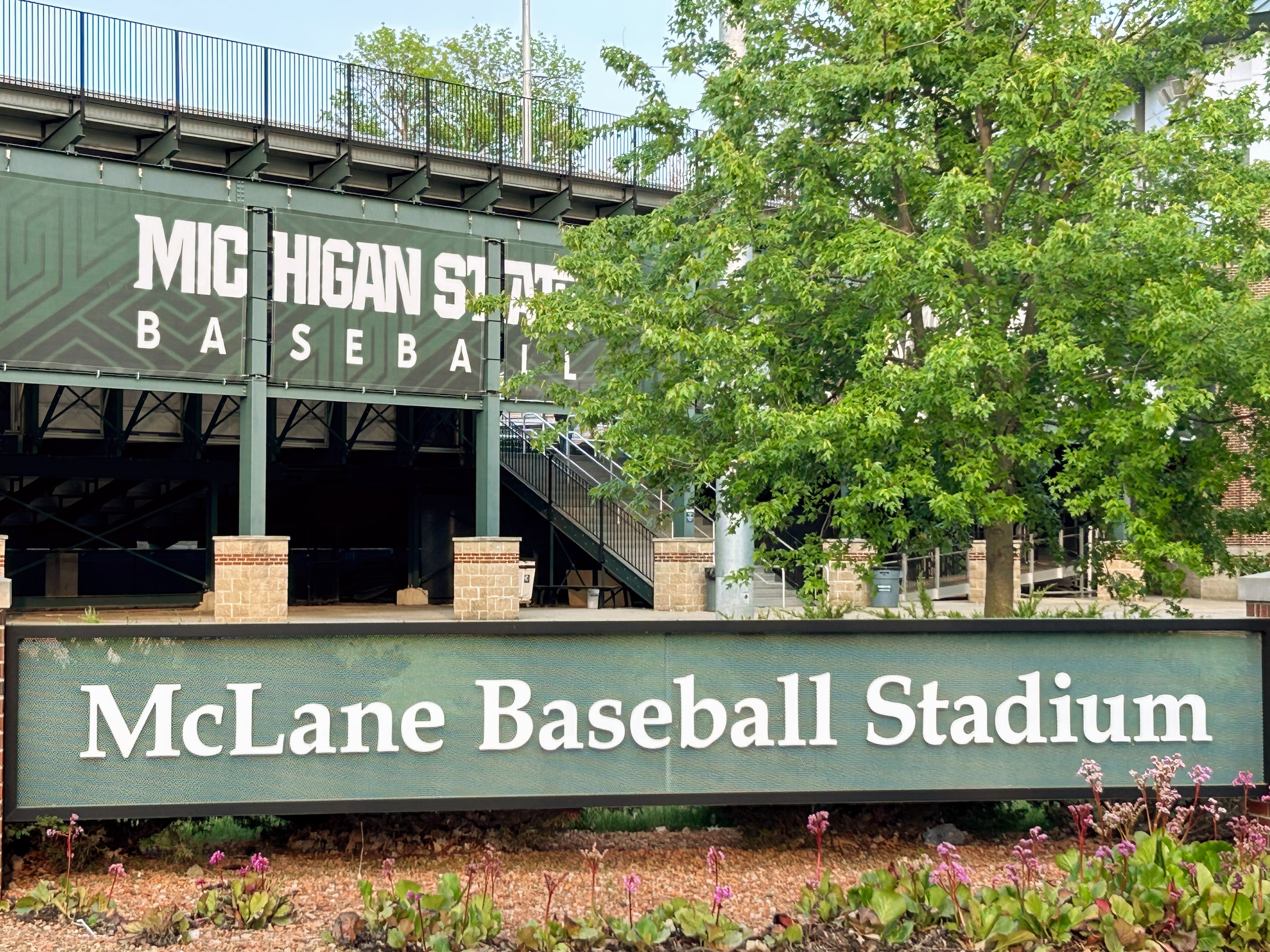

In the summer of 2015, the stadium had a new electric field-heating system installed by Sports Fields, Inc., becoming the first baseball field in the world with the state-of-the-art system.

The numbers of five former players have been honored by the Spartans and hang on the right field fence: No. 36 Robin Roberts, No. 30 Kirk Gibson, No. 10 Steve Garvey, No. 5 Tom Yewcic and No. 13 Mark Mulder. Also honored are No. 25, worn by coach John Kobs and No. 1 worn by coach Danny Litwhiler.

High school and amateur baseball games also take place at Ishbia Field. It was the largest baseball stadium in the Lansing area until the completion of Oldsmobile Park.

Prior to the 2005 renovation, seating at Kobs Field consisted of wooden bleachers with capacity of about 2,000, dating from shortly after World War II. Considerable open space outside the foul lines allowed standing room crowds in excess of 5,000 on isolated occasions.

== See also ==
- List of NCAA Division I baseball venues
