= Mickey Sullivan =

American baseball player and coach (1932–2012)

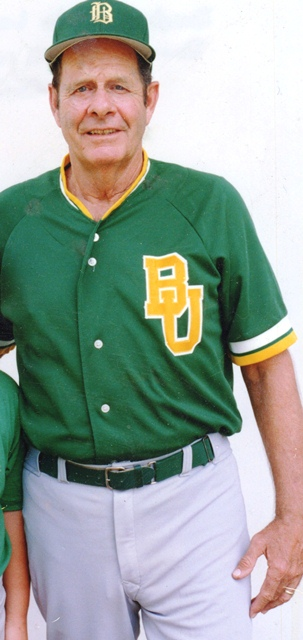
- Sullivan in 1993

Biographical details
- Born: February 6, 1932; Aransas Pass, Texas, U.S.
- Died: March 22, 2012 (aged 80); Waco, Texas, U.S.

Playing career
- 1952–1954: Baylor
- Position: Outfielder

Coaching career (HC unless noted)
- 1974–1994: Baylor

Head coaching record
- Overall: 649–428–3

Accomplishments and honors

Championships
- SWC Tournament (1977, 1978, 1993)

Awards
- All-SWC (1952, 1953, 1954); All-American (1953, 1954); SWC Coach of the Year (1977, 1978, 1985, 1988, 1991)
- College Baseball Hall of Fame; Inducted in 2014

Mickey Sullivan (February 6, 1932 – March 22, 2012) was the head baseball coach at Baylor from 1974 to 1994.

== Early life ==
Sullivan was born in Aransas Pass, Texas on February 6, 1932 to Alva Sullivan and Effie Sullivan, née McCollum.

Sullivan grew up in Houston, Texas and graduated from Sam Houston High School in 1950. As a senior running back at Sam Houston, Sullivan led the city in rushing and scoring, making the 1949 Houston Chronicle All-City Team. Sullivan was recruited to play college football by the University of Texas, Texas A&M University, the University of Houston, Rice University, the University of Kansas, and LSU, ultimately accepting a college football scholarship to attend Baylor University.

== Playing career ==
=== College career ===
As a freshman in 1950, Sullivan played on the freshman football team for head coach Sam Boyd. As a sophomore, Sullivan was a running back on the 1951 Baylor Bears football team. Led by All-American quarterback Larry Isbell, the Bears went on to play in the Orange Bowl and finished the season ranked #9 by the Associated Press and UPI, Baylor's highest finish in either poll. Ultimately, while never becoming a full-time starter, Sullivan went on to be a three-year letter winner under head coach George Sauer.

As a baseball player, Sullivan earned All-Southwest Conference honors in 1952, 1953, and 1954 and earned All-American honors as an outfielder in both 1953 and 1954. As a senior, Sullivan hit .519, a Southwest Conference record.

=== Professional career ===
After his sophomore year at Baylor, Sullivan was approached by the Washington Senators and offered a minor league baseball contract but Sullivan elected to return to Baylor.

Upon his graduation from Baylor, Sullivan signed with the Dallas Eagles of the Texas League. Sullivan spent the 1954 season playing minor league baseball for the Artesia Numexers of the Longhorn League, a Class C affiliate of the Eagles. Sullivan began the 1955 season with the Class A Sioux City Soos of the Western League until being called up to the Eagles for the last 52 games. Sullivan also spent the 1956 and 1957 season with the Eagles before retiring.

== Coaching career ==
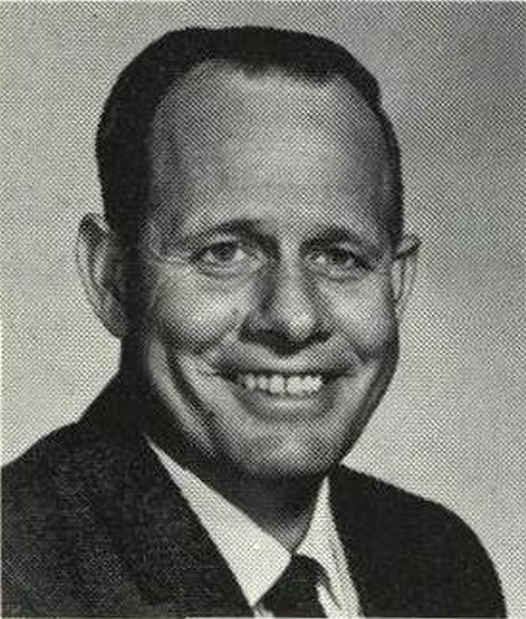
Sullivan as the Baylor Bears's head coach, c. 1976

Upon his retirement from professional baseball, Sullivan began his coaching career as a football coach at Jane Long Middle School in Houston. Sullivan became an assistant football, baseball, and basketball coach at Bellaire High School before moving to Westbury High School where Sullivan was an assistant football coach and the head baseball coach. Sullivan ultimately returned to Bellaire High School as the head football coach. Sullivan also served a scout for the Philadelphia Phillies where, among other players, he scouted Nolan Ryan.

Sullivan returned to Baylor in 1969 as the freshman football coach. In 1972, Grant Teaff promoted Sullivan to recruiting coordinator, a position he held until 1978.

In 1974, Sullivan became Baylor Bears baseball's 17th head coach, a position he would hold for the next 21 seasons. Sullivan endured just three losing seasons over those 21 years, leading Baylor to three Southwest Conference tournament championships and back-to-back trips to the College World Series in 1977 and 1978. In addition to 1977 and 1978, Sullivan also led Baylor to the NCAA tournament in 1991 and 1993.

Sullivan coached thirty-one players who were selected in the Major League Baseball draft, including four who were selected in the first round: Jon Perlman (1979), Stan Hilton (1983), Pat Combs (1988), and Scott Ruffcorn (1991).

Sullivan coached ten players who went on to play Major League Baseball: Steve Macko, Perlman, Andy Beene, Fritzie Connally, Lee Tunnell, Ken Patterson, Blaine Beatty, Combs, Ruffcorn, and Dean Crow.

On April 17, 2012, Steve Smith broke Sullivan's Baylor all-sports' record of 649 career victories.

== Personal life ==
In 1959, Sullivan married his wife Marilyn. Together, they had a son, Vince, and a daughter, Tina.

On March 22, 2012, Sullivan died at the age of 80 after a long battle with cancer. His memorial service was held at Baylor Ballpark on March 26.

== Head coaching record ==
Record table
Season	Team	Overall	Conference	Standing	Postseason
Baylor Bears (Southwest Conference) (1974–1994)
1974	Baylor	25–19	12–12	5th	
1975	Baylor	25-19	11-13	4th	
1976	Baylor	23–19	14–10	4th	
1977	Baylor	43–15	15–9	3rd	College World Series
1978	Baylor	32–19	15–9	3rd	College World Series
1979	Baylor	34–15	13–9	3rd	
1980	Baylor	25–19–2	12–12	5th	
1981	Baylor	21–24	6–15	8th	
1982	Baylor	25–22	9–12	6th	
1983	Baylor	26–22	11–10	4th	
1984	Baylor	26–23	9–12	5th	
1985	Baylor	42–13	14–7	2nd	
1986	Baylor	40–22	12–9	4th	
1987	Baylor	38–15	9–12	5th	
1988	Baylor	25–31–1	9–12	4th	
1989	Baylor	32–19	7–14	6th	
1990	Baylor	33–19	9–12	4th	
1991	Baylor	40–20	12–9	3rd	Midwest Regional
1992	Baylor	29–26	17–19	3rd	
1993	Baylor	41–19	11–7	2nd	South Regional
1994	Baylor	24–28–1	6–12	5th	
Total:		649–428–4			
National champion Postseason invitational champion Conference regular season champion Conference regular season and conference tournament champion Division regular season champion Division regular season and conference tournament champion Conference tournament champion
