= 1954 Oregon Webfoots baseball team =

American college baseball season

1954 Oregon Webfoots baseball

PCC North Division champions District VIII champions

College World Series
- Conference: Pacific Coast Conference
- North Division
- Record: 18–8 (11–5 PCC)
- Head coach: Don Kirsch (7th season)
- Captain: Pete Williams
- Home stadium: Howe Field

1954 Pacific Coast Conference baseball standings
| | Conf. | | | | | | Overall |
| Team | W | | L | | T | PCT | W | | L | | T | PCT |
|---|---|---|---|---|---|---|---|---|---|---|---|---|
North Division
| Oregon ‍†‍‍^{y} | 11 | – | 5 | – | 0 | .688 | 18 | – | 8 | – | 0 | .692 |
| Oregon State ‍‍‍ | 10 | – | 6 | – | 0 | .625 | 12 | – | 8 | – | 0 | .600 |
| Washington ‍‍‍ | 10 | – | 6 | – | 0 | .625 | 18 | – | 10 | – | 0 | .643 |
| Washington State ‍‍‍ | 7 | – | 9 | – | 0 | .438 | 18 | – | 12 | – | 0 | .600 |
| Idaho ‍‍‍ | 2 | – | 14 | – | 0 | .125 | 0 | – | 0 | – | 0 | – |
California Intercollegiate Baseball Association
| USC ‍†‍‍ | 11 | – | 5 | – | 0 | .688 | 20 | – | 11 | – | 1 | .641 |
| Stanford ‍‍‍ | 9 | – | 7 | – | 0 | .563 | 18 | – | 12 | – | 0 | .600 |
| California ‍‍‍ | 7 | – | 9 | – | 0 | .438 | 19 | – | 11 | – | 0 | .633 |
| Santa Clara ‍‍‍ | 7 | – | 9 | – | 0 | .438 | 14 | – | 13 | – | 0 | .519 |
| UCLA ‍‍‍ | 6 | – | 10 | – | 0 | .375 | 19 | – | 16 | – | 0 | .543 |
† – Conference champion y – Invited to the NCAA tournament

The 1954 Oregon Webfoots baseball team represented the University of Oregon in the 1954 NCAA baseball season. The Webfoots played their home games at Howe Field. The team was coached by Don Kirsch in his 7th year at Oregon.

The Webfoots won the District VII Playoff to advanced to the College World Series, where they were defeated by the UMass Minutemen.

== Roster ==
1954 Oregon Webfoots baseball team
Players
Coaches

| # | Pos. | Name | B/T | Height | Weight | Year | Home town |
|---|---|---|---|---|---|---|---|
| | P | Ferrell Albright | / | — | — |
| | OF | Bernie Averill | / | — | — | Sr |
| | P | Bill Blodgett | / | — | — | Jr |
| | P | Norm Forbes | / | — | — | Jr | Victoria, British Columbia |
| | P | Bill Garner | / | — | — | Sr |
| | C | Don Hedgepeth | / | — | — | Sr |
| | | Larry Hibbard | / | — | — | Jr |
| | P | Trenton Huls | / | — | — | Sr | San Bernardino, California |
| | INF | Jim Johnson | / | — | — | Jr |
| | INF | John Keller | / | — | — | So |
| | P | Gene Lewis | / | — | — |
| | C | Neal Marlett | /R | — | — | Jr |
| | OF | Ron Phillips | / | — | — | Sr |
| | P | Duane Reeves | / | — | — | Jr |
| | OF | Jerry Ross | / | — | — | So |
| | INF | Dick Schlosstein | / | — | — | So |
| | OF | George Shaw | / | — | — | Jr |
| | OF | Bob Wagner | / | — | — | Jr |
| | INF | Pete Williams | / | — | — | Jr |

Head coach

Don Kirsch

Assistant coach(es)

Legend

- (C) Team captain
- (S) Suspended
- (I) Ineligible
- Injured
- Current redshirt

== Schedule ==
1954 Oregon Webfoots baseball game log
Regular season
Regular Season (16–6)

| # | Date | Opponent | Site/stadium | Score | Overall record | ND Record |
|---|---|---|---|---|---|---|
| 1 | | Oregon State | Howe Field • Eugene, Oregon | 5–3 | 1–0 | – |
| 2 | | vs Lewis–Clark | Unknown • Unknown | 2–7 | 1–1 | – |
| 3 | | vs Lewis–Clark | Unknown • Unknown | 10–2 | 2–1 | – |
| 4 | | vs Willamette | Unknown • Unknown | 8–7 | 3–1 | – |
| 5 | | vs Seattle | Unknown • Unknown | 5–3 | 4–1 | – |
| 6 | | Washington State | Howe Field • Eugene, Oregon | 10–1 | 5–1 | 1–0 |
| 7 | | Washington State | Howe Field • Eugene, Oregon | 8–11 | 5–2 | 1–1 |
| | | at Washington State | Bailey Field • Pullman, Washington | 5–4 | – | – |
| | | at Washington State | Bailey Field • Pullman, Washington | 3–5 | – | – |
| | | Idaho | Howe Field • Eugene, Oregon | 7–2 | – | – |
| | | Idaho | Howe Field • Eugene, Oregon | 4–1 | – | – |
| | | at Idaho | MacLean Field • Moscow, Idaho | 13–4 | – | – |
| | | at Idaho | MacLean Field • Moscow, Idaho | 8–4 | – | – |
| | | Washington | Howe Field • Eugene, Oregon | 2–18 | – | – |
| | | Washington | Howe Field • Eugene, Oregon | 3–1 | – | – |
| | | at Washington | Old Graves Field • Seattle, Washington | 4–3 | – | – |
| | | at Washington | Old Graves Field • Seattle, Washington | 7–9 | – | – |
| 18 | | at Oregon State | Coleman Field • Corvallis, Oregon | 9–7 | 14–5 | 9–4 |
| 19 | | Oregon State | Howe Field • Eugene, Oregon | 3–7 | 14–6 | 9–5 |
| 20 | | at Oregon State | Coleman Field • Corvallis, Oregon | 12–6 | 15–6 | 10–5 |
| 21 | | Oregon State | Howe Field • Eugene, Oregon | 4–0 | 16–6 | 11–5 |

Postseason
NCAA District VIII Playoff (3–0)

| # | Date | Opponent | Site/stadium | Score | Overall record | ND Record |
|---|---|---|---|---|---|---|
| 22 | | Seattle | Howe Field • Eugene, Oregon | 9–4 | 16–6 | 11–5 |
| 23 | | Fresno State | Howe Field • Eugene, Oregon | 9–5 | 17–6 | 11–5 |
| 24 | | Fresno State | Howe Field • Eugene, Oregon | 1–0 | 18–6 | 11–5 |

College World Series (0–2)

| # | Date | Opponent | Site/stadium | Score | Overall record | ND Record |
|---|---|---|---|---|---|---|
| 25 | June 10 | vs Arizona | Omaha Municipal Stadium • Omaha, Nebraska | 1–12 | 18–7 | 11–5 |
| 26 | June 11 | vs UMass | Johnny Rosenblatt Stadium • Omaha, Nebraska | 8–3 | 18–8 | 11–5 |

== Awards and honors ==
Norm Forbes

- First Team All-District VIII
- All-North Division

John Keller

- All-North Division

Neal Marlett

- First Team All-District VIII
- All-North Division

George Shaw

- First Team All-American
- First Team All-District VIII
- All-North Division

Pete Williams

- All-North Division
