= Larry Isbell =

American baseball and gridiron football player (1930–1978)

Profile
- Positions: Defensive back, Quarterback

Personal information
- Born: January 8, 1930; Houston, Texas, U.S.
- Died: October 31, 1978 (aged 48); Bosque County, Texas, U.S.
- Listed height: 6 ft 1 in (1.85 m)
- Listed weight: 190 lb (86 kg)

Career information
- College: Baylor
- NFL draft: 1952: 1st round, 7th overall pick

Career history
- 1954–1959: Saskatchewan Roughriders

Awards and highlights
- First-team All-American (1951); 2× First-team All-SWC (1950, 1951); 3× CFL West All-Star (1956, 1957, 1958)

Lawrence Dale Isbell (January 8, 1930 – October 31, 1978) was an American baseball and gridiron football player. He was one of the rare players to be All-American in both baseball and in football. He was an All-American quarterback in 1951, when he guided the Baylor Bears football team to the Orange Bowl; he threw for 26 career touchdowns in college. In 1952, he was named the All-American catcher by the American Baseball Coaches Association. That season, he set a school record with a .431 average; through 2008, he still ranked second in Baylor Bears baseball annals for best single-season average, behind Mickey Sullivan. Isbell played minor league baseball for the Boston Red Sox and Brooklyn Dodgers organizations. He also played five years of professional football in the Canadian Football League (CFL) as a defensive back with the Saskatchewan Roughriders. He is a member of the Texas Sports Hall of Fame.

His older brothers Cody and Cecil Isbell played football for Purdue and Baylor University/Green Bay Packers respectively his younger brother William Adger "Dub" Isbell Jr. played football at Rice.

== Professional playing career ==
The National Football League's Washington Redskins picked Isbell in the first round of the 1952 NFL draft (He had the same draft position, #7, as his brother Cecil, making them perhaps the only pair of brothers to be drafted at the exact position), but he opted to sign with Major League Baseball's Boston Red Sox. The club sent him straight to AAA and he hit .266/.360/.337 for the Louisville Colonels in 1952, very similar numbers to the other Louisville catcher, former Major Leaguer Al Evans. Back with the Colonels in 1953, Isbell was even better at .317/.386/.397 in 47 games while fielding .995; he outhit Pete Daley, the starter at catcher. In fact, he had the best average of any Louisville batter with 25 or more games player, ahead of Charlie Maxwell, Harry Agganis, and Ken Aspromonte, among others. He also played three games for the Fort Worth Panthers, hitting .200.

Isbell's baseball career ended despite those two productive seasons. He then signed with the Saskatchewan Roughriders of the Canadian Football League (CFL) and played for five years as an All-Star defensive back as well as a punter, quarterback and wide receiver.

== Later life and honors ==
In 1977, Baylor began handing out the Larry Isbell MVP to its top baseball player. Isbell is a member of both the Baylor Hall of Fame and Texas Sports Hall of Fame. Isbell was living in Waco, Texas and working as a car salesman in Clifton, Texas when he died of a heart attack in 1978. In 2006, Baylor University hung banners around Floyd Casey Stadium honoring their best football players, including Larry Isbell.
