= Earl Lorden =

American college baseball coach and player (1896–1984)

Biographical details
- Born: 1896; Franklin, New Hampshire, U.S.
- Died: September 2, 1984; Amherst, Massachusetts, U.S.
- Education: University of New Hampshire

Coaching career (HC unless noted)
- 1947–1966: UMass

Head coaching record
- Overall: 187–146–3
- Tournaments: 5–5 (NCAA)

Accomplishments and honors

Championships
- 3 Yankee Conference (1952, 1957, 1966)

Earl E. Lorden (1896 – September 2, 1984) was an American college baseball coach and player. Lorden was the head baseball coach of the University of Massachusetts Amherst. Lorden played college baseball and football at the University of New Hampshire. The school's baseball field, Earl Lorden Field, was named after him in 1971.

== Head coaching record ==
Record table
Season	Team	Overall	Conference	Standing	Postseason
Massachusetts Minutemen (Independent) (1948–1951)
1948	Massachusetts	2–11			
1949	Massachusetts	5–11			
1950	Massachusetts	5–7			
1951	Massachusetts	10–8			
Massachusetts Minutemen (Yankee Conference) (1952–1966)
1952	Massachusetts	12–7	4–2	1st	
1953	Massachusetts	11–8	3–2		
1954	Massachusetts	15–7	4–2		College World Series
1955	Massachusetts	15–5	5–3		NCAA District I Tournament
1956	Massachusetts	10–6–1	7–1–1		NCAA District I Tournament
1957	Massachusetts	11–9	6–2	1st	
1958	Massachusetts	7–11	5–5		
1959	Massachusetts	10–6	4–5		
1960	Massachusetts	10–7	5–5		
1961	Massachusetts	11–5–1	7–2–1		
1962	Massachusetts	15–5	7–3		
1963	Massachusetts	10–7	2–6		
1964	Massachusetts	7–10–1	3–6–1		
1965	Massachusetts	7–11	6–4		
1966	Massachusetts	14–6	7–3	1st	
Massachusetts:		187–146–3	14–32		
Total:		187–146–3			
National champion Postseason invitational champion Conference regular season champion Conference regular season and conference tournament champion Division regular season champion Division regular season and conference tournament champion Conference tournament champion
