= Earl Lorden Field =

Baseball venue in Amherst, Massachusetts, US

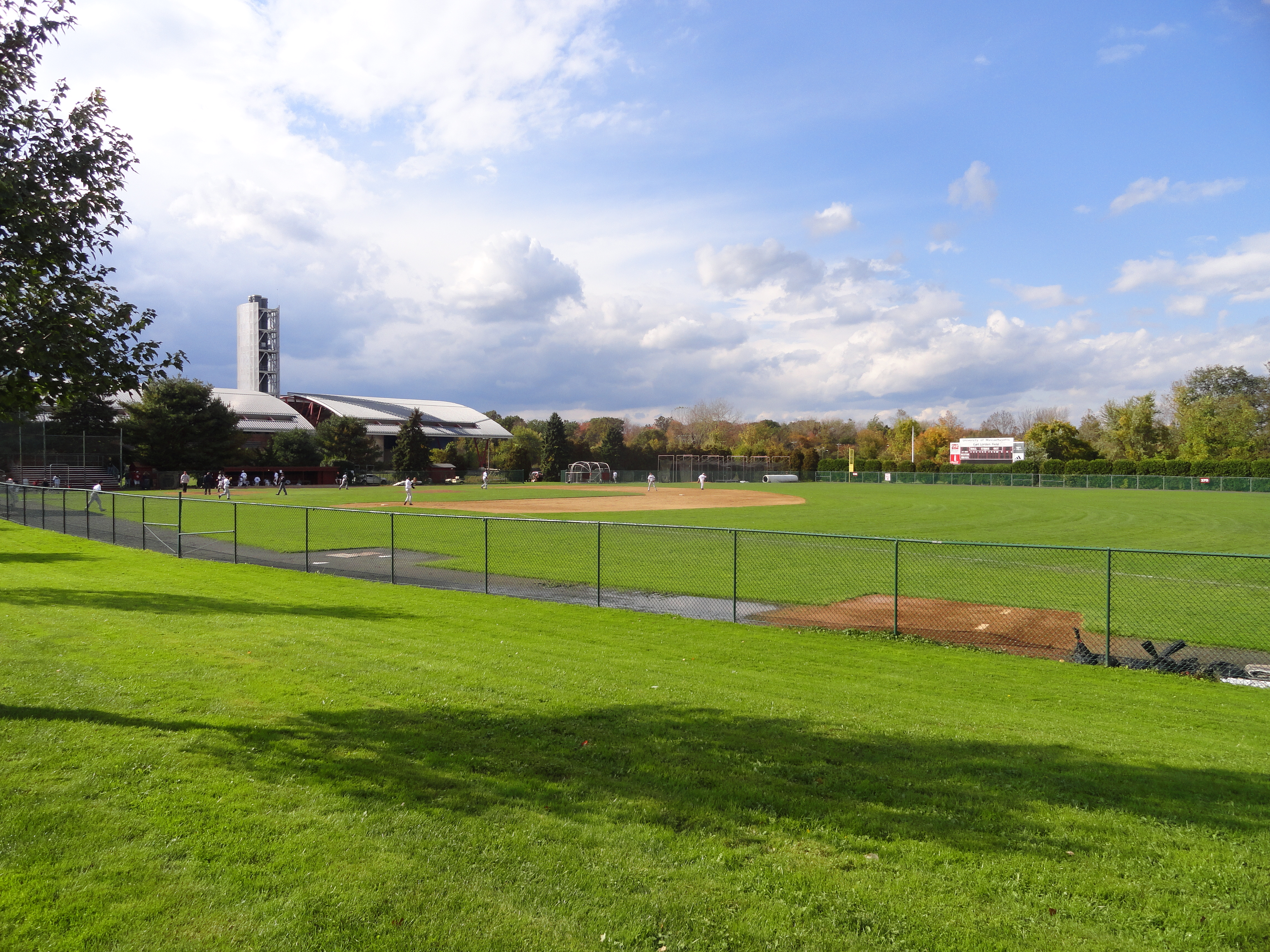
- Earl Lorden Field in 2011
- Interactive map of Earl Lorden Field
- Location: University of Massachusetts Amherst campus; Amherst, Massachusetts, US
- Coordinates: 42.389976°N 72.535582°W
- Owner: University of Massachusetts Amherst
- Operator: University of Massachusetts Amherst
- Surface: Natural grass
- Scoreboard: Electronic

Construction
- Opened: 1971

Tenant
- UMass Minutemen baseball (NCAA D1 MAC)

Earl Lorden Field is a baseball venue located on the campus of the University of Massachusetts Amherst in Amherst, Massachusetts, United States. The field is home to the UMass Minutemen baseball team of the NCAA Division I Mid-American Conference. The field is named after former UMass baseball coach Earl Lorden and was dedicated in his name on April 24, 1971.

== Renovations ==
An electronic scoreboard was constructed beyond the left field fence before the 2001 season.

In fall 2012, a new outfield wind screen was installed, an artificial turf halo was added around home plate, and the facility's dugouts were renovated.

== See also ==
- List of NCAA Division I baseball venues
