= Hi Simmons =

American baseball and football coach

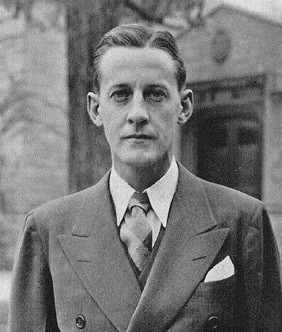
- Simmons from The Savitar, 1939

Biographical details
- Born: August 16, 1905; Lancaster, Missouri, U.S.
- Died: January 12, 1995 (aged 89); Columbia, Missouri, U.S.

Coaching career (HC unless noted)
- 1937–1973: Missouri

Head coaching record
- Overall: 481–294–3

Accomplishments and honors

Championships
- 1954 College World Series

John Carl "Hi" Simmons (August 16, 1905 – January 12, 1995) was the head baseball coach at the University of Missouri from 1937 until 1973.

== Early life and education ==
Simmons was born in Lancaster, Missouri, the son of Oliver H. Simmons and Etta Leedom Simmons. He graduated from Kirksville State College (now Truman State University).

== Coaching career ==
During Simmons' tenure as baseball coach, Missouri won one national championship, finished runner-up three other times, appeared in six College World Series and won 11 conference titles. Simmons' Missouri team won the 1954 College World Series and finished as runners-up in 1952, 1958 and 1964. He was named college baseball coach of the year in 1954 by the Rockne Club.

Simmons also served as a football assistant coach and scout under Don Faurot. He was honored by the Missouri alumni in 1962, and inducted into the Missouri Sports Hall of Fame in 1977, the University of Missouri Hall of Fame in 1990, and is also a member of the ABCA Hall of Fame.

== Death and legacy ==
Simmons married Frances Janet Vlcek in 1939, and had three sons. His larynx was removed by surgery to treat cancer in 1979. He died in 1995, at the age of 89, at his home in Columbia, Missouri. The field at Taylor Stadium is named Simmons Field in his honor.

== Head coaching record ==
Record table
Season	Team	Overall	Conference	Standing	Postseason
Missouri Tigers (Missouri Valley Intercollegiate Athletic Association) (1937–1973)
1937	Missouri	13–2–1	8–2	1st	
1938	Missouri	11–2	8–2	1st	
1939	Missouri	11–3	10–2	2nd	
1940	Missouri	8–4	6–4	3rd	
1941	Missouri	15–2	10–2	1st	
1942	Missouri	12–3	7–1	1st	
1943	Missouri	3–3	–		
1946	Missouri	5–7	4–4	4th	
1947	Missouri	11–8	9–6	2nd	
1948	Missouri	15–6	11–5	2nd	
1949	Missouri	7–11	5–7	6th	
1950	Missouri	11–9–1	9–5	2nd	
1951	Missouri	12–6	9–4	2nd	
1952	Missouri	20–7	13–1	1st	College World Series Runner-up
1953	Missouri	11–8	9–5	3rd	
1954	Missouri	22–4	11–1	1st	College World Series Champions
1955	Missouri	14–6	9–3	2nd	
1956	Missouri	14–7	7–6	4th	
1957	Missouri	13–7	10–7	3rd	
1958	Missouri	22–7	12–3	1st	College World Series Runner-up
1959	Missouri	3–17	3–11	8th	
1960	Missouri	12–9	9–6	4th	
1961	Missouri	16–7	13–6	2nd	
1962	Missouri	22–7	16–5	1st	College World Series
1963	Missouri	25–8	17–3	1st	College World Series
1964	Missouri	26–5–1	19–0	1st	College World Series Runner-up
1965	Missouri	15–8	13–5	1st	
1966	Missouri	13–12	9–9	4th	
1967	Missouri	15–14–1	12–9	2nd	
1968	Missouri	11–6	9–11	5th	
1969	Missouri	14–13	11–10	3rd	
1970	Missouri	12–13	8–9	5th	
1971	Missouri	17–16	12–9	4th	
1972	Missouri	16–16	9–11	6th	
1973	Missouri	13–21	8–12	5th	
Missouri:		481–294–3			
Total:		481–294–3			
National champion Postseason invitational champion Conference regular season champion Conference regular season and conference tournament champion Division regular season champion Division regular season and conference tournament champion Conference tournament champion
