= Don Gile =

American baseball player (1935–2021)

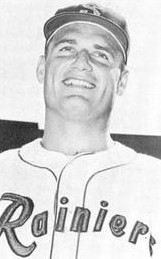
- First baseman / Catcher
- Born: April 19, 1935; Modesto, California, U.S.
- Died: March 5, 2021 (aged 85); Stillwater, Oklahoma, U.S.
- Batted: Right Threw: Right

MLB debut
- September 25, 1959, for the Boston Red Sox

Last MLB appearance
- September 30, 1962, for the Boston Red Sox

MLB statistics
- Batting average: .150
- Home runs: 3
- Runs batted in: 9
- Stats at Baseball Reference

Teams
- Boston Red Sox (1959–1962)

Donald Loren Gile (April 19, 1935 – March 5, 2021) was an American utility first baseman and catcher in Major League Baseball who played for one full season and parts of three others between 1959 and 1962 for the Boston Red Sox. Nicknamed "Bear" — he was listed at 6 feet 6 inches (1.98 m) and 220 pounds (100 kg) — Gile batted and threw right-handed. He was signed by Boston out of the University of Arizona. While at Arizona, Gile competed in the 1954 College World Series.

Over all or part of four MLB seasons, Gile hit .150 (18-for-120) with three home runs and nine RBI in 58 games, including 12 runs, 2 doubles and 1 triple. Gile played 31 games at first base and committed 4 errors in 224 chances for a .982 fielding%. In 19 appearances as a catcher, he posted a perfect 1.000 F% in 39 chances.

Gile played only one full year—1962—in the majors and went hitless in 34 at bats through September 25. In the first game of a doubleheader on September 30, he collected his first safety of the season. Then, in the nightcap, he collected his second hit of the campaign, a bottom-of-the-ninth, two-run walk-off home run, in his final MLB at-bat, to give Boston a 3–1 victory over the Washington Senators.

Gile played in minor league baseball in 1963 before leaving the game.

== Personal life ==
Gile was born on April 19, 1935 in Modesto, California. Gile died on March 5, 2021.

== See also ==
- Players who have hit a home run in their final major league at-bat
