= 1954 Rollins Tars baseball team =

American college baseball season

1954 Rollins Tars baseball

District 3 Champions College World Series runner-up
- Conference: Independent
- Record: 25–8
- Head coach: Joe Justice (8th season)
- Home stadium: Harper-Shepherd Field

The 1954 Rollins Tars baseball team represented Rollins College in the 1954 NCAA baseball season. The Tars were coached by Joe Justice in his 8th season at Rollins.

The Tars lost the College World Series, defeated by the Missouri Tigers in the championship game.

== Roster ==
1954 Rollins Tars roster
| Pitchers: Bill Cary; Bob Leader; Henry Menendez; Jack Powell; Don Tauscher; Frank Zutsell | Infielders: Jim Davis; Jim Doran; Bart Emerson; Delton Helms; Tommy Hulihan; Bob MacHardy; Catchers: Don Finnigan; Bud Fisher | Outfielders: Connie Mack Butler; Al Fantuzzi; Re Moody; Dave Smith; Dave Robinson; Coaches: Joe Justice - 8th Season |

== Schedule ==
1954 Rollins Tars baseball game log
Regular season
March

| Opponent | Site/stadium | Score | Overall record |
|---|---|---|---|
| North Carolina | Harper-Shepherd Field • Winter Park, FL | W 1–0 | 1–0 |
| North Carolina | Harper-Shepherd Field • Winter Park, FL | L 0–3 | 1–1 |
| Ohio State | Harper-Shepherd Field • Winter Park, FL | W 5–1 | 2–1 |
| Amherst | Harper-Shepherd Field • Winter Park, FL | L 5–8 | 2–2 |
| Georgia Tech | Harper-Shepherd Field • Winter Park, FL | W 6–5 | 3–2 |
| Ohio State | Harper-Shepherd Field • Winter Park, FL | L 1–2 | 3–3 |
| Georgia Tech | Harper-Shepherd Field • Winter Park, FL | W 6–5 | 4–3 |
| Clemson | Harper-Shepherd Field • Winter Park, FL | W 3–0 | 5–3 |
| Ohio State | Harper-Shepherd Field • Winter Park, FL | W 6–4 | 6–3 |

April/May

| Opponent | Site/stadium | Score | Overall record |
|---|---|---|---|
| Florida | | W 5–2 | 7–3 |
| Florida | | W 11–9 | 8–3 |
| Miami (FL) | | W 8–7 | 9–3 |
| Miami (FL) | | W 6–1 | 10–3 |
| Tampa | | W 7–1 | 11–3 |
| Presbyterian | | L 4–6 | 11–4 |
| Centre | | W 19–0 | 12–4 |
| Centre | | W 12–8 | 13–4 |
| Tampa | | W 20–0 | 14–4 |
| Florida Southern | | W 9–3 | 15–4 |
| Florida Southern | | W 16–1 | 16–4 |
| Stetson | | W 4–1 | 17–4 |
| Stetson | | W 6–5 | 18–4 |
| Miami (FL) | | L 2–4 | 18–5 |
| Miami (FL) | | W 6–3 | 19–5 |
| Stetson | | W 4–1 | 20–5 |
| Stetson | | W 6–5 | 21–5 |

Postseason
District 3 (2–0)

| Opponent | Site/stadium | Score | Overall record |
|---|---|---|---|
| vs VPI | Harper-Shepherd Field • Winter Park, FL | W 3–0 | 21–6 |
| vs VPI | Harper-Shepherd Field • Winter Park, FL | W 9–3 | 22–6 |

1954 College World Series (3–2)

| Date | Opponent | Site/stadium | Score | Overall record | CWS Record |
|---|---|---|---|---|---|
| June 10 | vs Oklahoma A&M | Rosenblatt Stadium • Omaha, NE | W 9–5 | 23–6 | 1–0 |
| June 11 | vs Missouri | Rosenblatt Stadium • Omaha, NE | W 4–1 | 24–6 | 2–0 |
| June 12 | vs Michigan State | Rosenblatt Stadium • Omaha, NE | W 5–4 | 25–6 | 3–0 |
| June 13 | vs Michigan State | Rosenblatt Stadium • Omaha, NE | L 2–3 | 25–7 | 3–1 |
| June 16 | vs Missouri | Rosenblatt Stadium • Omaha, NE | L 1–4 | 25–8 | 3–2 |
