= 1954 NCAA baseball season =

Baseball season

NCAA Tournament

College World Series
- Champions: Missouri (1st title)
- Runners-up: Rollins (1st CWS Appearance)
- Winning coach: Hi Simmons (1st title)
- MOP: Tom Yewcic (Michigan State)

Seasons
- ← 1953 1955 →

The 1954 NCAA baseball season, play of college baseball in the United States organized by the National Collegiate Athletic Association (NCAA) began in the spring of 1954. The season progressed through the regular season and concluded with the 1954 College World Series. The College World Series, held for the eighth time in 1954, consisted of one team from each of eight geographical districts and was held in Omaha, Nebraska at Johnny Rosenblatt Stadium as a double-elimination tournament. Missouri claimed the championship.

== Realignment ==
- Seven teams (Clemson, Duke, Maryland, North Carolina, NC State, South Carolina, and Wake Forest) departed the Southern Conference. They, together with Virginia, created the new Atlantic Coast Conference. Both leagues adopted single division formats, instead of the SoCon's previous two division format. Neither conference held a postseason tournament in 1954.

=== New program ===
- Texas Tech restarted its program, having been dormant since 1929. The Red Raiders played as an independent.

== Conference winners ==
This is a partial list of conference champions from the 1954 season. Each of the eight geographical districts chose, by various methods, the team that would represent them in the NCAA Tournament. Twelve teams earned automatic bids by winning their conference championship, and eleven teams earned at-large selections.

Conference	Regular season winner
Atlantic Coast Conference	Clemson
Big Seven Conference	Missouri
Big Ten Conference	Michigan State
CIBA	Southern California
EIBL	Navy
Mid-American Conference	Ohio
Pacific Coast Conference	Oregon
Southeastern Conference	Georgia
Southern Conference	Virginia Tech
Southwest Conference	Texas
Yankee Conference	New Hampshire

== Conference standings ==
The following is an incomplete list of conference standings:

1954 Big Seven Conference baseball standings
	Conf.				Overall
Team	W		L	PCT	W		L	PCT
Missouri ‍†‍‍^{y}	11	–	1	.917	22	–	4	.846
Oklahoma ‍‍‍	8	–	4	.667	12	–	8	.600
Iowa State ‍‍‍	7	–	7	.500		–		–
Kansas ‍‍‍	4	–	5	.444	10	–	6	.625
Colorado ‍‍‍	4	–	6	.400		–		–
Nebraska ‍‍‍	4	–	8	.333	10	–	10	.500
Kansas State ‍‍‍	3	–	10	.231	8	–	12	.400
† – Conference champion y – Invited to the NCAA tournament As of June 30, 1954; Rankings from Collegiate Baseball

1954 Big Ten Conference baseball standings
	Conf.						Overall
Team	W		L		T	PCT	W		L		T	PCT
Michigan State ‍†‍‍^{y}	11	–	2	–	0	.846	25	–	10	–	0	.714
Wisconsin ‍‍‍	10	–	3	–	0	.769	17	–	7	–	1	.700
Ohio State ‍‍‍	10	–	5	–	0	.667	20	–	11	–	0	.645
Michigan ‍‍‍	10	–	5	–	0	.667	22	–	9	–	0	.710
Northwestern ‍‍‍	7	–	6	–	0	.538	15	–	11	–	0	.577
Minnesota ‍‍‍	6	–	9	–	0	.400	17	–	14	–	0	.548
Iowa ‍‍‍	5	–	10	–	0	.333	10	–	15	–	1	.404
Indiana ‍‍‍	4	–	9	–	0	.308	12	–	14	–	0	.462
Purdue ‍‍‍	4	–	11	–	0	.267	13	–	13	–	0	.500
Illinois ‍‍‍	4	–	11	–	0	.267	16	–	15	–	0	.516
† – Conference champion y – Invited to the NCAA tournament As of June 30, 1954; Rankings from Collegiate Baseball

1954 Eastern Intercollegiate Baseball League baseball standings
	Conf.						Overall
Team	W		L		T	PCT	W		L		T	PCT
Navy ‍†‍‍^{y}	8	–	1	–	0	.889	16	–	5	–	1	.750
Princeton ‍‍‍	6	–	2	–	0	.750	15	–	8	–	0	.652
Yale ‍‍‍	7	–	3	–	0	.700	16	–	12	–	0	.571
Army ‍‍‍	5	–	3	–	0	.625	11	–	7	–	0	.611
Cornell ‍‍‍	4	–	3	–	1	.563	11	–	6	–	1	.639
Brown ‍‍‍	3	–	3	–	1	.500	9	–	8	–	2	.526
Harvard ‍‍‍	3	–	5	–	0	.375	7	–	15	–	0	.318
Penn ‍‍‍	2	–	4	–	1	.357	7	–	11	–	1	.395
Dartmouth ‍‍‍	1	–	5	–	1	.214	5	–	16	–	1	.250
Columbia ‍‍‍	1	–	7	–	0	.125	5	–	9	–	0	.357
† – Conference champion y – Invited to the NCAA Tournament

1954 Missouri Valley Conference baseball standings
	Conf.				Overall
Team	W		L	PCT	W		L	PCT
Saint Louis ‍‍‍	2	–	0	1.000		–		–
Oklahoma A&M ‍†‍‍^{y}	8	–	1	.889	18	–	11	.621
Houston ‍‍‍	4	–	5	.444	12	–	10	.545
Tulsa ‍‍‍	4	–	5	.444	11	–	10	.524
Wichita State ‍‍‍	2	–	7	.222	4	–	9	.308
Detroit ‍‍‍	0	–	2	.000	6	–	12	.333
† – Conference champion y – Invited to the College World Series; As of June 30, 1954; Rankings from Coaches' Poll

1954 Pacific Coast Conference baseball standings
	Conf.						Overall
Team	W		L		T	PCT	W		L		T	PCT
North Division
Oregon ‍†‍‍^{y}	11	–	5	–	0	.688	18	–	8	–	0	.692
Oregon State ‍‍‍	10	–	6	–	0	.625	12	–	8	–	0	.600
Washington ‍‍‍	10	–	6	–	0	.625	18	–	10	–	0	.643
Washington State ‍‍‍	7	–	9	–	0	.438	18	–	12	–	0	.600
Idaho ‍‍‍	2	–	14	–	0	.125	0	–	0	–	0	–
California Intercollegiate Baseball Association
USC ‍†‍‍	11	–	5	–	0	.688	20	–	11	–	1	.641
Stanford ‍‍‍	9	–	7	–	0	.563	18	–	12	–	0	.600
California ‍‍‍	7	–	9	–	0	.438	19	–	11	–	0	.633
Santa Clara ‍‍‍	7	–	9	–	0	.438	14	–	13	–	0	.519
UCLA ‍‍‍	6	–	10	–	0	.375	19	–	16	–	0	.543
† – Conference champion y – Invited to the NCAA tournament

== College World Series ==
The 1954 season marked the eighth NCAA Baseball Tournament, which consisted of the eight team College World Series. The College World Series was held in Omaha, Nebraska. The eight teams played a double-elimination format, with Missouri claiming their first championship with a 4–1 win over Rollins College in the final.

Upper round 1
Michigan State	16
UMass	5
Arizona	12
Oregon	1
Rollins	9^{11}
Oklahoma A&M	5
Missouri	5
Lafayette	3

Upper round 2
Michigan State	2
Arizona	1
Rollins	4
Missouri	1
Lower round 1
UMass	5
Oregon	3
Oklahoma A&M	4
Lafayette	2

Upper final
Michigan State	4
Rollins	5
Lower round 2
Missouri	8
UMass	1
Arizona	4
Oklahoma A&M	5^{14}

Semifinals
Rollins	2
Michigan State	3^{10}
Missouri	7
Oklahoma A&M	3

Preliminary final
Michigan State	3
Missouri	4

Final
Rollins	1
Missouri	4
