= 1954 Lafayette Leopards baseball team =

American college baseball season

1954 Lafayette Leopards baseball

District II champions

College World Series, T-7th
- Conference: Independent
- Record: 16–8
- Head coach: Charlie Gelbert (9th season)
- Captain: Chuck Eyer
- Home stadium: Fisher Field

The 1954 Lafayette Leopards baseball team represented Lafayette College in the 1954 NCAA baseball season. The Leopards played their home games at Fisher Field. The team was coached by Charlie Gelbert in his 9th year at Lafayette.

The Leopards won the District II Playoff to advanced to the College World Series, where they were defeated by the Oklahoma A&M Cowboys.

== Roster ==
1954 Lafayette Leopards baseball team
Players
Coaches

#	Pos.	Name	B/T	Height	Weight	Year	Home town
	INF	Ed Deorrman	/	—	—
	C	Maynard Dill	/	—	—	Jr	Wilmington, Delaware
	OF	Don Divine	/	—	—
	INF	Joe Dixon	/	—	—	Jr	Easton, Pennsylvania
	C	Andy Duckworth	/	—	—
	RHP	Karl Dutt	/R	—	—	Jr
	INF	Chuck Eyer (C)	/	—	—	Sr	Emmaus, Pennsylvania
	RHP	Roger Gordon	/R	—	—	Jr	Wilmington, Delaware
	INF	Bill Hogerty	/	—	—	Jr	Princeton, New Jersey
	P	Dick Masters	/	—	—	So
	P	Earl Maurer	/	—	—	So
	LHP	Don Owens	/L	—	—	Jr
	INF	Ernie Peters	/	—	—	So
	P	Bryan Satterlee	/	—	—	So
	P	Roy Schneider	/	—	—	Jr
	LHP	Dick Somers	/L	—	—
	INF	Bill Vercelli	/	—	—	Jr	Cliffside Park, New Jersey

Head coach

Charlie Gelbert

Assistant coach(es)

Legend

- (C) Team captain
- (S) Suspended
- (I) Ineligible
- Injured
- Current redshirt

== Schedule ==
1954 Lafayette Leopards baseball game log
Regular season
April (8–3)

#	Date	Opponent	Site/stadium	Score	Overall record
1	April 3	Yale	Fisher Field • Easton, Pennsylvania	5–0	1–0
2	April 7	Princeton	Fisher Field • Easton, Pennsylvania	1–7	1–1
3	April 8	La Salle	Fisher Field • Easton, Pennsylvania	9–2	2–1
4	April 10	at Navy	Unknown • Annapolis, Maryland	10–4	3–1
5	April 13	Moravian	Fisher Field • Easton, Pennsylvania	6–3	4–1
6	April 15	at Delaware	Unknown • Newark, Delaware	4–0	5–1
7	April 19	at Scranton	Unknown • Scranton, Pennsylvania	19–6	6–1
8	April 20	at NYU	Unknown • New York, New York	6–7	6–2
9	April 21	at Army	Doubleday Field • West Point, New York	2–3	6–3
10	April 24	at Penn State	New Beaver Field • University Park, Pennsylvania	5–2	7–3
11	April 27	Albright	Fisher Field • Easton, Pennsylvania	12–0	8–3

May (6–3)

#	Date	Opponent	Site/stadium	Score	Overall record
12	May 1	Rutgers	Fisher Field • Easton, Pennsylvania	9–1	9–3
13	May 4	Temple	Fisher Field • Easton, Pennsylvania	1–2	9–4
14	May 6	at Muhlenberg	Unknown • Allentown, Pennsylvania	2–3	9–5
15	May 12	at Swarthmore	Unknown • Swarthmore, Pennsylvania	13–4	10–5
16	May 15	Lehigh	Fisher Field • Easton, Pennsylvania	5–0	11–5
17	May 19	vs Seton Hall	Unknown • Unknown	4–5	11–6
18	May 22	at Rutgers	Bainton Field • Piscataway, New Jersey	6–4	12–6
19	May 25	Fordham	Fisher Field • Easton, Pennsylvania	6–1	13–6
20	May 29	Rider	Fisher Field • Easton, Pennsylvania	10–2	14–6

Postseason
District II Playoff (2–0)

#	Date	Opponent	Site/stadium	Score	Overall record
21	June 4	vs Villanova	Breadon Field • Allentown, Pennsylvania	4–3	15–6
22	June 5	vs St. John's	Breadon Field • Allentown, Pennsylvania	9–0	16–6

College World Series (0–2)

#	pri	Opponent	Site/stadium	Score	Overall record
23	June 10	vs Missouri	Omaha Municipal Stadium • Omaha, Nebraska	3–5	16–7
24	June 11	vs Oklahoma A&M	Omaha Municipal Stadium • Omaha, Nebraska	2–4	16–8
