= Don Kirsch =

American baseball coach (1920–1970)

Biographical details
- Born: September 29, 1920; Portland, Oregon, U.S.
- Died: May 7, 1970 (aged 49); Stanford, California, U.S.

Playing career
- 1940–1943: Oregon
- Position: Second base

Coaching career (HC unless noted)
- 1948–1970: Oregon

Head coaching record
- Overall: 445-242

Donald Kirsch (September 29, 1920 – May 7, 1970) was a college baseball coach at the University of Oregon for 23 years.

== Early life and playing career ==
Kirsch was born in Portland, Oregon in 1920. He attended Jefferson High School where he played basketball and baseball. He played on three Portland Interscholastic League championship baseball teams and was all-PIL in both baseball and basketball.

After graduating from high school, Kirsch attended the University of Oregon, where he played baseball and basketball for Howard Hobson, who was coach of both teams. Kirsch was a three-year letterman in both sports.

== Coaching career ==
In 1948, Hobson left Oregon to coach basketball at Yale, and Kirsch was named to succeed him as the Ducks' baseball coach. In his 23 years as head coach, Kirsch never had a losing season. Under his leadership, the Ducks won five Northern Division titles, and in 1954, led the Ducks to the 1954 College World Series. Though the team was eliminated in two straight games, this marked Oregon's only appearance in the College World Series. Kirsch was named District VIII coach of the year in 1963.

== Illness and death ==
In 1967, Kirsch was diagnosed with Parkinson's disease. He continued to coach the Ducks until 1970, when he stepped down as coach to pursue experimental medical treatment at Stanford University Medical Center. On May 7, 1970, Kirsch fell from a second-story balcony at Stanford Hospital into a courtyard, and died soon afterwards from massive head injuries.

== Legacy ==
Kirsch was named to the American Baseball Coaches Association Hall of Fame in 1972, the Oregon Sports Hall of Fame in 1981, the University of Oregon Sports Hall of Fame in 1993, and the Portland Interscholastic League Sports Hall of Fame in 2005.
