= John Kobs =

American athlete and coach (1898–1968)

Biographical details
- Born: August 21, 1898; Cavalier, North Dakota, U.S.
- Died: January 26, 1968 (aged 69); East Lansing, Michigan, U.S.

Playing career
- 1920–1921: Hamline

Coaching career (HC unless noted)

Baseball
- 1922–1924: Hamline
- 1925–1963: Michigan State

Hockey
- 1925–1931: Michigan State

Basketball
- 1924–1926: Michigan State

Head coaching record
- Overall: 574–377–16 (baseball); 9–19–1 (hockey); 11–26 (basketball)

John H. Kobs (August 21, 1898 – January 26, 1968) was an American athlete and coach. He was the head baseball coach at Michigan State University from 1925 to 1963 where he compiled a career record of 576–377–16. He also coached men's basketball (1924–1926) and ice hockey (1925–1931) at Michigan State. He has been inducted into both the Michigan Sports Hall of Fame and the MSU Athletics Hall of Fame.

== Early years ==
Kobs was born in Cavalier, North Dakota in 1898. He moved to Lake City, Minnesota while in grade school and attended Hamline University in St. Paul, Minnesota. At Hamline, he was a multi-sport athlete winning 13 varsity letters—four each in football and basketball, three in baseball, and two in track. He was also named to Minnesota's All-State college teams for three years each in football and basketball and two years in baseball. In January 1951, Kobs was selected as one of the top five all-around athletes in Minnesota during the first half of the 20th century, as selected by a board of Minnesota sports experts.

== Coaching career ==
After graduating from Hamline University, he spent two years from 1922 to 1924 as a member of the school's coaching staff.

In May 1924, Kobs was hired as the baseball and basketball coach at Michigan Agricultural College. He was the head coach of the Aggies'/Spartans' baseball team for 38 years from 1925 to 1963. During his 38 years as head baseball coach at Michigan State, Kobs compiled a record of 574 wins, 377 losses and 16 ties for a winning percentage of .602. He had only four losing seasons in 38 campaigns, and his 1954 team won the Big Ten Conference championship and the NCAA District No. 4 playoffs and finished third in the College World Series at Omaha, Nebraska.

Kobs coached numerous athletes who went on to play Major League Baseball, including Baseball Hall of Fame inductee Robin Roberts, whom Kobs switched from a first baseman to a pitcher. Other Major League players developed by Kobs include Bob Anderson, Ed Hobaugh, Jack Kralick, Hobie Landrith, Al Luplow, Ron Perranoski, Dick Radatz, and George Smith.

Kobs was a charter member, past president and past secretary of the Association of College Baseball Coaches. He also served for many years as the secretary of the NCAA baseball rules committee. He was a member and secretary of the United States Olympic Baseball Committee and coached two United States baseball teams in the Pan American Games. After his final season as Michigan State's baseball coach, Kobs was honored by the National Rockne Club as the Collegiate Baseball Coach of the Year in March 1964.

Kobs also coached the Michigan State men's basketball team for two years from 1924 to 1926, compiling a record of 11–26. He was also the Spartans' first ice hockey coach, holding the position for six years from 1925 to 1931 with a record of 9–19–1. In his early years at the school, he also coached freshman football and served as an assistant coach on the varsity football team.

In June 1963, Kobs voluntarily resigned from active coaching at age 64 and became administrative assistant to Michigan State athletic director Biggie Munn. In December 1966, Kobs announced that he would retire effective July 1, 1967, following 43 years of service to Michigan State.

== Death and posthumous honors ==
In January 1968, Kobs died of a heart attack at his home in East Lansing, Michigan, at age 69. He was survived by his wife, Lauretta Kobs, and two sons, Robert Kobs and John Kobs, Jr.

Two months after his death, Kobs was posthumously inducted into the Michigan Sports Hall of Fame; his award was accepted by his widow, Lauretta Kobs at a dinner and ceremony at Cobo Hall in Detroit. In March 1969, Michigan State's Board of Trustees approved naming the university's baseball field "John Kobs Field" in honor of Kobs. The field was dedicated between games of a doubleheader against Wisconsin on May 10, 1969. The field and stadium are now known as Drayton McLane Baseball Stadium at John H. Kobs Field. The field remains named after Kobs, and the stadium facility is named after Houston Astros owner and Michigan State alumni Drayton McLane.

Kobs was also posthumously inducted into the MSU Athletics Hall of Fame in 1993 as part of the second group of inductees. He has also been inducted into the Helms Foundation Hall of Fame, and the Hall of Fame of the American Association of College Baseball Coaches. John Kobs is also a member of the Hamline University Sports Hall of Fame.

== Head coaching record ==
=== Baseball ===
1925: 9–5 –1 (.633)
1926: 13–7–0 (.650)
1927: 13–8–0 (.619)
1928: 11–7–0 (.611)
1929: 12–11–1 (.521)
1930: 16–6–0 (.727)
1931: 13–9–1 (.587)
1932: 10–12–2 (.458)
1933: 13– 7–0 (.650)
1934: 10–11–1 (.477)
1935: 11–9–1 (.548)
1936: 13–7–0 (.650)
1937: 16–11–0 (.593)
1938: 15–9–0 (.625)
1939: 13–10–0 (.565)
1940: 12–8–2 (.591)
1941: 13–10–0 (.565)
1942: 13–11–1 (.540)
1943: 9–7–0 (.563)
1944: (No varsity team because of WWII)
1945: 12–4–0 (.750)
1946: 21–5–0 (.808)
1947: 16–8–0 (.667)
1948: 10–14–1 (.420)
1949: 19–8–1 (.696)
1950: 19–9–0 (.679)
1951: 17–9–0 (.654)
1952: 18–14–0 (.563)
1953: 11–17–0 (.393)
1954: 25–10–1 (.708)
1955: 21–11–0 (.656)
1956: 16–13–0 (.552)
1957: 18–13–1 (.578)
1958: 22–12–0 (.647)
1959: 21–14–0 (.600)
1960: 17–13–0 (.567)
1961: 21–11–1 (.652)
1962: 17–13–0 (.567)
1963: 18–14–1 (.561)

=== Ice Hockey ===
Record table
Season	Team	Overall	Conference	Standing	Postseason
Michigan State Spartans Independent (1924–1930)
1924–25	Michigan State	0–1–0			
1925–26	Michigan State	0–4–0			
1926–27	Michigan State	1–3–0			
1927–28	Michigan State	3–3–0			
1928–29	Michigan State	3–3–1			
1929–30	Michigan State	1–4–0			
Michigan State:		8–18–1			
Total:		8–18–1			
National champion Postseason invitational champion Conference regular season champion Conference regular season and conference tournament champion Division regular season champion Division regular season and conference tournament champion Conference tournament champion
