= Bob Powell (baseball) =

American baseball player (1933–2014)

- Pinch runner
- Born: October 17, 1933; Flint, Michigan, U.S.
- Died: April 26, 2014 (aged 80); Muscle Shoals, Alabama, U.S.
- Batted: Right Threw: Right

MLB debut
- September 16, 1955, for the Chicago White Sox

Last MLB appearance
- April 20, 1957, for the Chicago White Sox

MLB statistics
- Games played: 2
- Runs scored: 1
- Stats at Baseball Reference

Teams
- Chicago White Sox (1955, 1957)

Robert Leroy Powell (October 17, 1933 – April 26, 2014), identified by his middle name on baseball cards as Leroy Powell, was an American professional baseball player. He threw and batted right-handed, stood 6 feet 1 inch (1.85 m) tall and weighed 190 pounds (86 kg).

The graduate of Michigan State University signed a $36,000 "bonus baby" contract with the Chicago White Sox in 1955. An outfielder when he signed, Powell was kept on the ChiSox' Major League roster for 1955, 1956 and part of 1957 under the Bonus Rule of the time. He appeared in only two Major League Baseball games as a pinch runner — both times against the Kansas City Athletics. On September 16, 1955, he ran for slow-footed White Sox pinch hitter Ron Northey, who had singled, and was erased on a force play at second base on the first pitch to the next hitter, Minnie Miñoso. On April 20, 1957, he ran for another pinch hitter, Walt Dropo, advanced to second base on a hit by Luis Aparicio and then scored his only MLB run on a single by Nellie Fox. Both Aparicio and Fox are now in the Baseball Hall of Fame.

After seeing Powell throw batting practice for his teammates, 1955–1956 White Sox manager Marty Marion converted him into a pitcher. Powell spent the latter half of the 1956 season serving in the U.S. military, then returned to the White Sox roster for the start of 1957, when he made his final MLB appearance. Chicago was able to send him to the minor leagues later in 1957, but Powell struggled as a pitcher in the Class A Western League — although he batted over .300 in 1957 — and left baseball after the 1958 season.

== See also ==
- List of baseball players who went directly to Major League Baseball
