= Carl Thomas (baseball) =

American baseball player (1932–2013)

- Pitcher
- Born: May 28, 1932; Minneapolis, Minnesota, U.S.
- Died: March 7, 2013 (aged 80); Phoenix, Arizona, U.S.
- Batted: Right Threw: Right

MLB debut
- April 19, 1960, for the Cleveland Indians

Last MLB appearance
- May 14, 1960, for the Cleveland Indians

MLB statistics
- Win–loss record: 1–0
- Earned run average: 7.45
- Strikeouts: 5
- Stats at Baseball Reference

Teams
- Cleveland Indians (1960)
Medals
Men's baseball
Representing United States
Pan American Games
Silver medal – second place	1955 Mexico City	Team

Carl Leslie Thomas (May 28, 1932 – March 7, 2013) was an American former Major League Baseball pitcher who played for one season. He pitched in four games for the Cleveland Indians during the 1960 season. A right-hander, he stood 6 feet 5 inches (1.96 m) tall and weighed 245 pounds (111 kg). He won a silver medal with the United States team at the 1955 Pan American Games.

In his only decision, Thomas won his last Major League game, on May 14, 1960, against the Chicago White Sox. Although he allowed five hits and five earned runs in 4 1/3 innings pitched of relief, he was credited with the 10–9 victory.
