= 1954 Missouri Tigers baseball team =

American college baseball season

1954 Missouri Tigers baseball

National champions Big Seven Conference champions
- Conference: Big Eight Conference
- Record: 22–4 (11–1 Big Seven)
- Head coach: Hi Simmons (16th year)
- Home stadium: Rollins Field

1954 Big Seven Conference baseball standings
	Conf.				Overall
Team	W		L	PCT	W		L	PCT
Missouri ‍†‍‍^{y}	11	–	1	.917	22	–	4	.846
Oklahoma ‍‍‍	8	–	4	.667	12	–	8	.600
Iowa State ‍‍‍	7	–	7	.500		–		–
Kansas ‍‍‍	4	–	5	.444	10	–	6	.625
Colorado ‍‍‍	4	–	6	.400		–		–
Nebraska ‍‍‍	4	–	8	.333	10	–	10	.500
Kansas State ‍‍‍	3	–	10	.231	8	–	12	.400
† – Conference champion y – Invited to the NCAA tournament As of June 30, 1954; Rankings from Collegiate Baseball

The 1954 Missouri Tigers baseball team represented the University of Missouri in the 1954 NCAA baseball season. The Tigers played their home games at Rollins Field. The team was coached by Hi Simmons in his 16th season at Missouri.

The Tigers won the College World Series, defeating Rollins College 4-1 in the final.

== Season Recap ==
=== College World Series ===
In the first round, Missouri defeated the Lafayette Leopards by a score of 6-3. Missouri was then knocked into the loser's bracket after a 4-1 second-round loss to Art Brophy and Rollins College. Behind lefthander Ed Cook, the Tigers then defeated the UMass Minutemen 8-1.

Missouri defeated Oklahoma A&M Aggies 7-3 in the behind a strong outing from starting pitcher Norm Stewart and home runs from Jerry Schoonmaker and George Gleason. Tied 3-3 with the Michigan State Spartans heading into the ninth inning, Emil Kammer singled home Buddy Cox to propel Missouri into the championship game for a rematch against Rollins College and Art Brophy.

Missouri bested Rollins 4-1 in the championship game behind a great outing from Ed Cook and a Buddy Cox home run.

With seven triples, Missouri tied Holy Cross's record for triples in a College World Series.

== Roster ==
1954 Missouri Tigers roster
Pitchers: Bob Bauman; Bert Beckmann; Gene Gastineau; Emil Kammer; Norm Stewart; Catchers: Lloyd Elmore; George Gleason	Infielders: Buddy Cox; Dick Dickinson; Jack Gabler; Herb Morgan; Bob Schoonmaker; Todd Sickel	Outfielders: Jim Doerr; Kent Henson; Bob Musgrave; Sam Sayers; Jerry Schoonmaker; Lee Roy Wynn; Coaches: Hi Simmons

== Schedule ==
1954 Missouri Tigers baseball game log

Regular season
Date	Opponent	Score	Overall record	Big Seven Record
April 3	Fort Leonard Wood	3–6	0–1	–
April 6	Fort Leonard Wood	4–2	1–1	–
April 9	Arkansas	18–0	2–1	–
April 10	Arkansas	12–6	3–1	–
April 16	Oklahoma A&M	3–5	3–2	–
April 17	Oklahoma A&M	12–6	4–2	–
April	Sedalia Air Force Base	24–1	5–2	–
April	Sedalia Air Force Base	11–3	6–2	–
April 26	Iowa State	1–5	6–3	0–1
April 27	Iowa State	5–3	7–3	1–1
May 7	Kansas State	5–3	8–3	2–1
May 8	Kansas State	10–5	9–3	3–1
May 10	Colorado	11–5	10–3	4–1
May 11	Colorado	11–2	11–3	5–1
May 14	Oklahoma	14–1	12–3	6–1
May 15	Oklahoma	6–3	13–3	7–1
May 17	Nebraska	3–1	14–3	8–1
May 18	Nebraska	18–1	15–3	9–1
May 21	Iowa State	7–2	16–3	10–1
May 22	Iowa State	12–1	17–3	11–1

Postseason

NCAA tournament: College World Series
Date	Opponent	Site/stadium	Score	Overall record
June 10	vs. Lafayette	Rosenblatt Stadium	5–3	18–3
June 11	vs. Rollins	Rosenblatt Stadium	1–4	18–4
June 12	vs. Massachusetts	Rosenblatt Stadium	8–1	19–4
June 13	vs. Oklahoma A&M	Rosenblatt Stadium	7–3	20–4
June 14	vs. Michigan State	Rosenblatt Stadium	4–3	21–4
June 16	vs. Rollins	Rosenblatt Stadium	4–1	22–4

== Awards and honors ==
Jerry Schoonmaker

- First Team All-American
- All-District V
- Led NCAA with six home runs

Emil Kammer

- All-District V

Bob Musgrave

- All-District V

== Team Photo ==
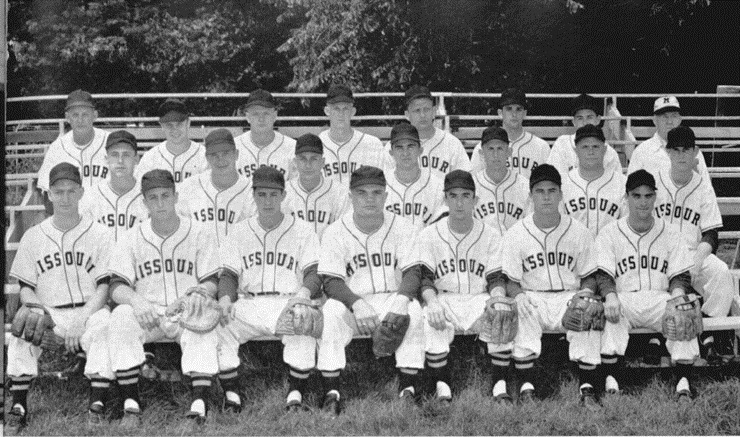
