= Tom Yewcic =

American football and baseball player (1932–2020)

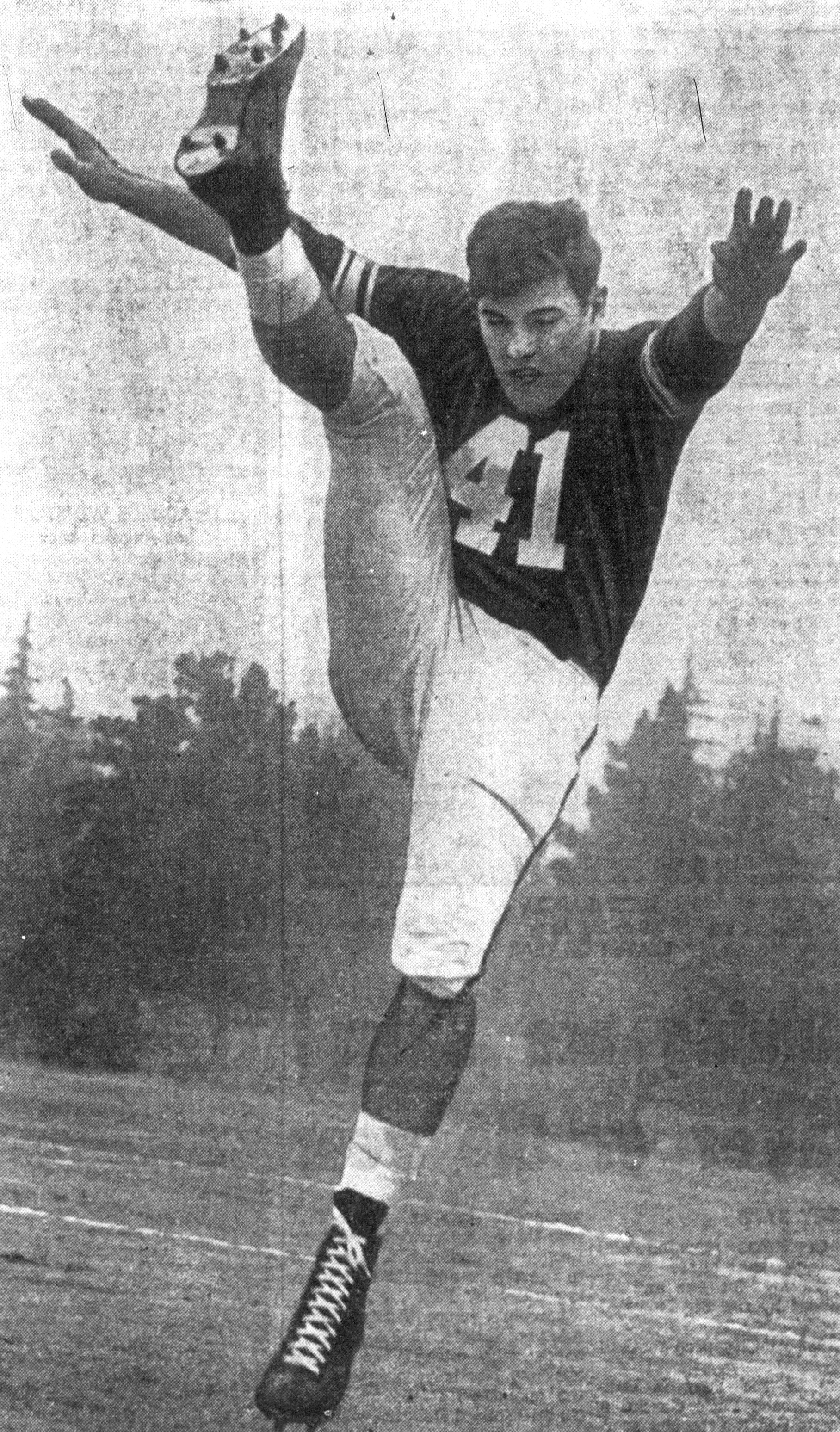
- Yewcic, circa 1953

No. 14
- Positions: Quarterback, punter, halfback

Personal information
- Born: May 9, 1932; Conemaugh, Pennsylvania, U.S.
- Died: October 21, 2020 (aged 88); Arlington, Massachusetts, U.S.
- Listed height: 5 ft 11 in (1.80 m)
- Listed weight: 185 lb (84 kg)

Career information
- High school: Conemaugh Township (Davidsville, Pennsylvania)
- College: Michigan State (1950–1953)
- NFL draft: 1954: 27th round, 319th overall pick

Career history

Playing
- Boston Patriots (1961–1966)

Coaching
- Boston Patriots (1967) Coach assistant; Boston Patriots (1968) Offensive backs coach; New England Colonials (1973) Head coach; New England Patriots (1976–1978) Special teams coach; New England Patriots (1979–1980) Offensive backs coach

Awards and highlights
- Boston Patriots All-1960s Team; National champion (1952); Second-team All-Big Ten (1953)

Career AFL statistics
- Passing attempts: 206
- Passing completions: 87
- Completion percentage: 42.2%
- TD–INT: 12–12
- Passing yards: 1,374
- Passer rating: 60.2
- Punting yards: 14,553
- Longest punt: 70
- Stats at Pro Football Reference

Thomas J. Yewcic (May 9, 1932 – October 21, 2020) was an American professional football quarterback and punter and Major League Baseball player. He attended Michigan State University. In football, he played from 1961 to 1966 with the Boston Patriots of the American Football League (AFL), and is a member of the Patriots All-1960s AFL Team. In baseball, he played one game for the Detroit Tigers in 1957.

== Professional career ==
Playing quarterback, Yewcic had a career-high 90 yards rushing and led his Boston Patriots to a 24–17 victory over the New York Titans at Boston University Field on November 30, 1962.

Yewcic punted 377 times for 14,553 yards over the 1961 through 1966 regular seasons for the Boston Patriots. He also was used as a flanker and running back. He completed 87 passes for 1,374 yards and 12 touchdowns and had 72 carries for 424 yards and four touchdowns. He caught seven passes for 69 yards and recovered three fumbles in 77 regular season games. Yewcic played in two playoff games for the Boston Patriots and completed three passes for eight yards, ran for a 10-yard gain and punted 14 times for a total of 523 yards. His longest punt in the playoffs was 68 yards.

Yewcic had a career long 46-yard run in the Patriots 14–10 loss to the Denver Broncos on September 29, 1963. His career longest reception was 46 yards in their 45–17 rout of the Denver Broncos on September 16, 1961. Yewcic's longest punt was 70 yards in their 27–23 win over the New York Jets on November 28, 1965. Yewcic holds the team record for the longest run by a Patriots punter in a regular season game: a 20-yard gain in the Patriots 26–16 win over the Oakland Raiders at Boston University Field on October 26, 1962.

Yewcic is tied with Chris Hanson for the most games with only one punt (4) during their career with the Patriots. Yewcic averaged a career best 40.7 yards per punt for the 1965 season. Yewcic and Tom Brady are the only Patriots players who have punted, thrown a touchdown pass, caught a pass, and run for a touchdown.

After his playing career, Yewcic served as an assistant coach with the Patriots under Mike Holovak (1968) and Chuck Fairbanks (1976–1978), coached college and semipro football, and worked in private business. He and his family lived in Arlington, Massachusetts.

Tom Yewcic Football Stadium at Conemaugh Valley High School is named for him.

== AFL career statistics ==
Legend
	Led the league
**Bold**	Career high
Underline	Incomplete data

=== Regular season ===
Year	Team	Games			Passing									Rushing					Punting					Sacked		Fum
Year	Team	GP	GS	Record	Cmp	Att	Pct	Yds	Y/A	Lng	TD	Int	Rtg	Att	Yds	Y/A	Lng	TD	Pnt	Yds	Y/P	Lng	Blck	Sck	SckY	Fum
1961	BOS	**14**	1	—	3	8	37.5	25	3.1	18	1	2	46.4	11	51	4.6	13	1	64	2,406	37.6	64	**2**	—	—	0
1962	BOS	**14**	**4**	**3–1**	**54**	**126**	42.9	**903**	**7.2**	**78**	**7**	**5**	69.6	**33**	**215**	6.5	27	**2**	69	2,654	38.5	56	1	**12**	**85**	**8**
1963	BOS	**14**	1	0–1	29	70	41.4	444	6.3	57	4	**5**	52.3	22	161	**7.3**	**46**	1	74	2,880	38.9	65	1	3	39	3
1964	BOS	**14**	0	—	1	1	**100.0**	2	2.0	2	0	0	**79.2**	5	2	0.4	2	0	73	2,787	38.2	63	1	1	11	1
1965	BOS	**14**	0	—	0	1	0.0	0	0.0	0	0	0	39.6	0	0	—	0	0	**76**	**3,094**	**40.7**	**70**	**2**	1	4	0
1966	BOS	7	0	—	0	0	—	0	—	0	0	0	—	1	−5	−5.0	−5	0	21	732	34.9	49	1	0	0	1
Career		77	6	3–2	87	206	42.2	1,374	6.7	78	12	12	60.2	72	424	5.9	46	4	377	14,553	38.6	70	8	17	139	13

=== Postseason ===
Year	Team	Games			Passing									Rushing					Punting					Sacked		Fum
Year	Team	GP	GS	Record	Cmp	Att	Pct	Yds	Y/A	Lng	TD	Int	Rtg	Att	Yds	Y/A	Lng	TD	Pnt	Yds	Y/P	Lng	Blck	Sck	SckY	Fum
1963	BOS	2	0	—	3	8	37.5	39	4.9	23	0	1	14.1	1	14	14.0	14	0	14	554	39.6	68	0	0	0	0
Career		2	0	—	3	8	37.5	39	4.9	23	0	1	14.1	1	14	14.0	14	0	14	554	39.6	68	0	0	0	0

== Baseball career ==
Tom Yewcic
- Catcher
- Batted: Right Threw: Right

MLB debut
- June 27, 1957, for the Detroit Tigers

Last MLB appearance
- June 27, 1957, for the Detroit Tigers

MLB statistics
- Batting average: .000
- Games played: 1
- At bats: 1
- Stats at Baseball Reference

Teams
- Detroit Tigers (1957)

As a baseball player at Michigan State, Yewcic was named the College World Series Most Outstanding Player of the 1954 College World Series despite his team not reaching the championship game. After signing with the Detroit Tigers, he began his career with the minor league Wilkes-Barre Barons in 1954. During his four-season professional baseball career, Yewcic went on to play one game as a catcher with the big-league Tigers on June 27, 1957. He was a defensive replacement for the Tigers' starting catcher, Red Wilson, also a former Big Ten football star (in his case, at the University of Wisconsin–Madison), in the sixth inning of a game at Griffith Stadium in which the Tigers were trailing the Washington Senators, 6–2. Yewcic caught the game's final three innings, making one error in six total chances. He came to bat once, in the seventh inning against Tex Clevenger, and popped out to Washington shortstop Milt Bolling.

Yewcic continued to play in baseball's minor leagues until 1959, when he switched to football.

== College career ==
Yewcic is still the only player to win a Rose Bowl and also be named the College World Series Most Valuable Player - in the same year no less.

He was inducted into the MSU Athletics Hall of Fame in 2003 and was named the MSU Baseball Distinguished Alumnus of the Year in 2013.

One of the most decorated Spartans in school history, Yewcic was the starting quarterback in 1952 and 1953, leading the Spartans to an undefeated national championship in '52 and the program's first-ever Big Ten Championship and Rose Bowl victory during the '53 season. In the spring of 1954, the first-team All-American catcher helped the baseball team win its first Big Ten title and advance to the College World Series for the first time in program history.

Yewcic and the Spartans went 3–2 at the College World Series to finish in third place, as Michigan State closed the year with a 25-10-1 record, then a school record for victories. Yewcic was named the CWS Most Valuable Player for his outstanding performance in MSU's five games.

He also became the first player in program history to be named a first-team All-American by the American Baseball Coaches Association, as he hit .305 with three homers, five doubles and 12 RBI in conference play.

Yewcic was also a three-year letterwinner in football (1951–53) and earned All-America status in 1952 by NBC-TV after leading the Spartans to an undefeated 9–0 season and the consensus national championship. As the team's starting quarterback, he completed 41-of-95 passes for 941 yards, then a school season record, and 10 touchdowns. In his first game as a starting quarterback, he was 7-of-14 passing for 171 yards and rallied the Spartans to a 27–13 win at Michigan. Yewcic was just the second Spartan QB to reach the 200-yard passing mark when he threw for 202 yards in the 48–6 win over Texas A&M.

Yewcic also played quarterback on the 1953 Big Ten Championship team that went 9-1 and defeated UCLA in the program's first-ever appearance in the Rose Bowl. He threw for seven touchdowns and 489 yards as a senior that season.

He finished his career with 18 touchdown passes and 1,480 passing yards as the Spartans compiled a 27–1 record during his three years on the team. He also was the starting punter for MSU from 1951 to 1953 and averaged 38.7 yards per punt (4,762 yards on 123 punts).

== See also ==
- List of American Football League players
