= Frank Sancet =

American baseball player and coach (1907–1985)

Biographical details
- Born: August 24, 1907; New York, New York, U.S.
- Died: March 22, 1985 (aged 77); Tucson, Arizona, U.S.

Playing career
- 1926–1927: Phoenix College
- 1928–1929: Arizona
- 1930: Tampa Smokers
- 1937–1938: Tucson Cowboys
- Position: Catcher

Coaching career (HC unless noted)
- 1947–1949: Arizona (assistant)
- 1950–1972: Arizona

Head coaching record
- Overall: 831–275–10

Francisco Sancet (August 24, 1907 – March 22, 1985) was an American baseball coach and catcher. He served as the head baseball coach at the University of Arizona from 1950 to 1972, compiling a record of 831–275–10. He played college baseball for Phoenix College from 1926 to 1927 before transferring to Arizona where he played for coach Pop McKale from 1928 to 1929 before playing professionally.

== Career ==
Sancet played professional baseball in minor league baseball for the Tampa Smokers and the Tucson Cowboys. He coached the Arizona Wildcats baseball team to an 831–275–10 win–loss record in 23 seasons, from 1950 through 1972.

After his death, the University of Arizona renamed their baseball field in his honor. Sancet was inducted into the Pima County Sports Hall of Fame in 1991. He was inducted into the National College Baseball Hall of Fame in 2012.
