= Ivy League baseball tournament =

US sports championship

- Conference baseball championship
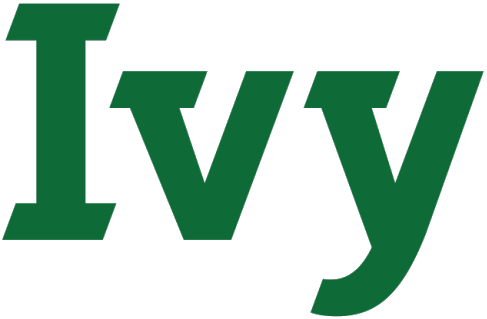
- Sport: College baseball
- Conference: Ivy League
- Number of teams: 4
- Format: Double Elimination
- Current stadium: Regular Season Champion
- Last contest: 2026
- Current champion: Yale (4)
- Most championships: Princeton (8)
- Official website: ivyleague.com/baseball

Host stadiums
- List: Meiklejohn Stadium (2022–2023) Joseph J. O'Donnell Field (1997, 1999, 2005, 2006, 2019) Bush Field (1995, 1998, 2017, 2018, 2025, 2026) Bill Clarke Field (1996, 2000, 2002–2003, 2011, 2016) Robertson Field at Satow Stadium (2010, 2013–2015, 2024) Hoy Field (2012) Red Rolfe Field at Biondi Park (2001, 2004, 2008–2009) Murray Stadium (2007) Yogi Berra Stadium (2024) Palmer Field (1993–1994)

Host locations
- List: Philadelphia, PA (2022–2023) Boston, MA (1997, 1999, 2005, 2006, 2019) New Haven, CT (1995, 1998, 2017, 2018, 2025, 2026) Princeton, NJ (1996, 2000, 2002–2003, 2011, 2016) New York, NY (2010,2013–2015, 2024) Ithaca, NY (2012) Hanover, NH (2001, 2004, 2008–2009) Providence, RI (2007) Middletown, CT (1993–1994) Little Falls, NJ (2024)

The Ivy League baseball tournament is the conference baseball championship of the NCAA Division I Ivy League. The top four finishers from the round-robin regular season participate in a double elimination tournament held at the site of the regular season champion, with the winner earning the conference's automatic bid to the NCAA Division I Baseball Championship. Penn won the inaugural Ivy League tournament in 2023.

From 1993 until 2022 (except for 2020 and 2021 when the series was canceled due to the COVID-19 pandemic), the league's top two teams played in a best-of-three series at the end of the regular season, which was known as the Ivy League Championship Series.

== History ==
In 1930, six of the eight Ivy League teams formed the Eastern Intercollegiate Baseball League. Harvard joined in 1934, while Brown, Army and Navy joined in 1948. When Army and Navy joined the Patriot League for the 1993 season, the Ivy League began sponsoring baseball.

From 1993 to 2017, the teams are split into two divisions; the Mid-Atlantic members are in the Lou Gehrig Division, and the New England members are in the Red Rolfe Division. The winners of each division met in a best-of-three championship series to determine the Ivy League's automatic bid to the NCAA Division I baseball tournament.

The divisions were dissolved in 2018, with the top two teams from the regular season meeting in the championship series. The team with the best regular season record is named the Ivy League champion. However, the winner of the championship series still gained the league's automatic bid to the NCAA Division I baseball tournament. The event was canceled for 2020 and 2021 due to the coronavirus pandemic.

Starting in 2023, the Ivy League replaced the series format with a four-team double elimination tournament held at the site of the regular season champion. The winner of the tournament receives an automatic berth to the NCAA tournament.

== Champions ==
For a list of EIBL champions, see List of Eastern Intercollegiate Baseball League Champions

=== By year ===
The following is a list of conference champions and sites by year.

==== Championship Series ====
Year	Champion	Runner-up	Games	Venue
1993	Yale	Columbia	2	Palmer Field • Middletown, CT
1994	Yale	Penn	3	Palmer Field • Middletown, CT
1995	Penn	Yale	2	Yale Field • New Haven, CT
1996	Princeton	Harvard	2	Bill Clarke Field • Princeton, NJ
1997	Harvard	Princeton	3	Joseph J. O'Donnell Field • Boston, MA
1998	Harvard	Princeton	2	Yale Field • New Haven, CT
1999	Harvard	Princeton	3	Joseph J. O'Donnell Field • Boston, MA
2000	Princeton	Dartmouth	2	Bill Clarke Field • Princeton, NJ
2001	Princeton	Dartmouth	3	Red Rolfe Field at Biondi Park • Hanover, NH
2002	Harvard	Princeton	2	Bill Clarke Field • Princeton, NJ
2003	Princeton	Harvard	3	Bill Clarke Field • Princeton, NJ
2004	Princeton	Dartmouth	2	Red Rolfe Field at Biondi Park • Hanover, NH
2005	Harvard	Cornell	2	Joseph J. O'Donnell Field • Boston, MA
2006	Princeton	Harvard	2	Joseph J. O'Donnell Field • Boston, MA
2007	Brown	Penn	2	Murray Stadium • Providence, RI
2008	Columbia	Dartmouth	3	Red Rolfe Field at Biondi Park • Hanover, NH
2009	Dartmouth	Cornell	3	Red Rolfe Field at Biondi Park • Hanover, NH
2010	Dartmouth	Columbia	3	Robertson Field at Satow Stadium • New York, NY
2011	Princeton	Dartmouth	3	Bill Clarke Field • Princeton, NJ
2012	Cornell	Dartmouth	3	Hoy Field • Ithaca, NY
2013	Columbia	Dartmouth	2	Robertson Field at Satow Stadium • New York, NY
2014	Columbia	Dartmouth	2	Robertson Field at Satow Stadium • New York, NY
2015	Columbia	Dartmouth	3	Robertson Field at Satow Stadium • New York, NY
2016	Princeton	Yale	3	Bill Clarke Field • Princeton, NJ
2017	Yale	Penn	2	Yale Field • New Haven, CT
2018	Columbia	Yale	2	Yale Field • New Haven, CT
2019	Harvard	Columbia	2	Joseph J. O'Donnell Field • Boston, MA
2020	Canceled due to the coronavirus pandemic			
2021	Canceled due to the coronavirus pandemic			
2022	Columbia	Penn	3	Meiklejohn Stadium • Philadelphia, PA

==== Tournament ====
Year	Champion	Runner-up	Venue
2023	Penn	Princeton	Meiklejohn Stadium • Philadelphia, PA
2024	Penn	Cornell	Robertson Field at Satow Stadium • New York, NY; Yogi Berra Stadium • Little Falls, NJ (Note: Due to field maintenance issues that deemed Robertson Field at Satow Stadium unplayable after Game 3 of the 2024 Ivy League tournament, the remainder of the tournament was moved to Yogi Berra Stadium on the campus of Montclair State University.)
2025	Columbia	Harvard	Bush Field • New Haven, CT
2026	Yale	Brown	Bush Field • New Haven, CT

== Championships by school ==
The following is a list of conference champions listed by school.

Program	App.	Titles	Winning years
Princeton	13	8	1996, 2000, 2001, 2003, 2004, 2006, 2011, 2016
Columbia	11	7	2008, 2013, 2014, 2015, 2018, 2022, 2025
Harvard	11	6	1997, 1998, 1999, 2002, 2005, 2019
Yale	8	4	1993, 1994, 2017, 2026
Penn	9	3	1995, 2023, 2024
Dartmouth	11	2	2009, 2010
Brown	2	1	2007
Cornell	3	1	2012
