= 2008 Ivy League Baseball Championship Series =

2008 Ivy League baseball tournament
- Teams: 2
- Format: Best of three series
- Finals site: Red Rolfe Field at Biondi Park; Hanover, New Hampshire
- Champions: Columbia (1st title)
- Winning coach: Brett Boretti (1st title)

2008 Ivy League baseball standings
	Conf.						Overall
Team	W		L		T	PCT	W		L		T	PCT
Lou Gehrig
Columbia ^{x}‍‍‡‍^{y}	15	–	5	–	0	.750	22	–	30	–	0	.423
Princeton ‍‍‍	11	–	9	–	0	.550	20	–	22	–	0	.476
Penn ‍‍‍	6	–	13	–	1	.325	15	–	23	–	1	.397
Cornell ‍‍‍	6	–	14	–	0	.300	12	–	27	–	0	.308
Red Rolfe
Dartmouth ^{x}‍‍‍	15	–	5	–	0	.750	25	–	17	–	0	.595
Yale ‍‍‍	9	–	10	–	1	.475	20	–	24	–	1	.456
Brown ‍‍‍	9	–	11	–	0	.450	20	–	24	–	0	.455
Harvard ‍‍‍	8	–	12	–	0	.400	10	–	30	–	0	.250
x – Division champion ‡ – Championship Series champion y – Invited to the NCAA tournament As of June 30, 2008; Rankings from Collegiate Baseball

The 2008 Ivy League Baseball Championship Series took place at Red Rolfe Field at Biondi Park in Hanover, New Hampshire on May 6 and 7, 2008. The series matched the regular season champions of each of the league's two divisions. Columbia, the winner of the series, claimed the Ivy League's automatic berth in the 2008 NCAA Division I baseball tournament. It was Columbia's first Championship Series victory.

Dartmouth made their fourth appearance in the Championship Series, and first since 2004. They had yet to win the event.

== Results ==
Finals
Columbia	11	15	7
Dartmouth	7	16	5
