= 2009 Ivy League Baseball Championship Series =

College baseball championship

2009 Ivy League baseball tournament
- Teams: 2
- Format: Best of three series
- Finals site: Red Rolfe Field at Biondi Park; Hanover, New Hampshire
- Champions: Dartmouth (1st title)
- Winning coach: Bob Whalen (1st title)

2009 Ivy League baseball standings
	Conf.				Overall
Team	W		L	PCT	W		L	PCT
Lou Gehrig
Cornell ^{x}‍‍‍	10	–	10	.500	17	–	23	.425
Princeton ^{x}‍‍‍	10	–	10	.500	18	–	19	.486
Columbia ‍‍‍	7	–	13	.350	11	–	32	.256
Penn ‍‍‍	5	–	15	.250	17	–	24	.415
Red Rolfe
Dartmouth ^{x}‍‍‡‍^{y}	16	–	4	.800	27	–	18	.600
Brown ‍‍‍	15	–	5	.750	24	–	19	.558
Harvard ‍‍‍	10	–	10	.500	13	–	28	.317
Yale ‍‍‍	7	–	13	.350	13	–	24	.351
x – Division champion ‡ – Championship Series champion y – Invited to the NCAA tournament As of June 30, 2009; Rankings from Collegiate Baseball

The 2009 Ivy League Baseball Championship Series took place at Red Rolfe Field at Biondi Park in Hanover, New Hampshire on May 2 and 3, 2009. The series matched the regular season champions of each of the league's two divisions. Dartmouth, the winner of the series, claimed the Ivy League's automatic berth in the 2009 NCAA Division I baseball tournament. It was Dartmouth's first Championship Series victory, coming in their fifth appearance.

Cornell defeated Princeton in a one-game playoff to advance to the Championship Series and represent the Lou Gehrig Division. The playoff was held on April 29 at Hoy Field in Ithaca, New York.

== Results ==
Finals
Cornell	6	14	0
Dartmouth	8	12	10
