= 2017 Ivy League Baseball Championship Series =

2017 Ivy League baseball tournament
- Teams: 2
- Format: Best of three series
- Finals site: Yale Field; New Haven, CT
- Champions: Yale Bulldogs (3rd title)

2017 Ivy League baseball standings
	Conf.				Overall
Team	W		L	PCT	W		L	PCT
Lou Gehrig
Penn ^{x}‍‍‍	12	–	8	.600	23	–	22	.511
Columbia ^{x}‍‍‍	12	–	8	.600	18	–	23	.439
Cornell ‍‍‍	9	–	11	.450	21	–	17	.553
Princeton ‍‍‍	7	–	13	.350	12	–	28	.300
Red Rolfe
Yale ^{x}‍‍‡‍^{y}	16	–	4	.800	34	–	18	.654
Dartmouth ‍‍‍	11	–	9	.550	22	–	17	.564
Harvard ‍‍‍	7	–	13	.350	19	–	23	.452
Brown ‍‍‍	6	–	14	.300	13	–	24	.351
x – Division champion ‡ – Championship Series champion y – Invited to the NCAA tournament Rankings from Collegiate Baseball

The 2017 Ivy League Baseball Championship Series was held at Yale Field, home field of the Rolfe Division champion Yale Bulldogs on May 16. The series matched the regular season champions of each of the league's two divisions. Yale won their third championship series and claimed the Ivy League's automatic berth in the 2017 NCAA Division I baseball tournament.

Yale won the Rolfe Division while Columbia and Pennsylvania tied for the Gehrig Division title with identical 12–8 records. Pennsylvania won a one-game playoff on May 7 to advance to the Championship Series.

== Results ==
Game One

May 16, 2017 12:00 pm
Team	1	2	3	4	5	6	7	8	9	R	H	E
Pennsylvania	0	0	0	0	0	0	0	0	0	0	5	0
Yale	0	0	0	1	2	2	0	0	X	5	9	0
WP: Politz LP: Cousins; Boxscore

Game Two

May 16, 2016 3:30 PM
Team	1	2	3	4	5	6	7	8	9	R	H	E
Yale	4	0	6	0	1	0	0	0	0	11	14	3
Pennsylvania	0	0	0	0	3	0	2	2	0	7	15	0
WP: Brodkowitz LP: Bleday; Home runs: Yale: DeGraw, Wanger 2 Penn: Graul, Halevy; Attendance: 801; Boxscore
