= 2011 Ivy League Baseball Championship Series =

2011 Ivy League baseball tournament
- Teams: 2
- Format: Best of three series
- Finals site: Bill Clarke Field; Princeton, New Jersey
- Champions: Princeton (7th title)
- Winning coach: Scott Bradley (6th title)

2011 Ivy League baseball standings
	Conf.				Overall
Team	W		L	PCT	W		L	PCT
Lou Gehrig
Princeton ^{x}‍‍‡‍^{y}	15	–	5	.750	23	–	24	.489
Penn ‍‍‍	10	–	10	.500	19	–	21	.475
Columbia ‍‍‍	9	–	11	.450	19	–	25	.432
Cornell ‍‍‍	7	–	13	.350	10	–	30	.250
Red Rolfe
Dartmouth ^{x}‍‍‍	14	–	6	.700	30	–	12	.714
Yale ‍‍‍	11	–	9	.550	23	–	19	.548
Brown ‍‍‍	9	–	11	.450	13	–	29	.310
Harvard ‍‍‍	5	–	15	.250	9	–	36	.200
x – Division champion ‡ – Championship Series champion y – Invited to the NCAA tournament As of June 30, 2011; Rankings from Collegiate Baseball

The 2011 Ivy League Baseball Championship Series took place at Bill Clarke Field in Princeton, New Jersey, on May 7 and 8, 2011. The series matched the regular season champions of each of the league's two divisions. Princeton, the winner of the series, claimed the Ivy League's automatic berth in the 2011 NCAA Division I baseball tournament. It was Princeton's seventh title, extending their lead for most championships. It was also their first championship series win since 2006, when they won their fifth in the previous seven years.

Dartmouth has appeared in the Ivy League Championship Series every year since 2008, winning in 2009 and 2010.

== Results ==
Finals
Princeton	9	4	8
Dartmouth	2	5	5
