= 2014 Ivy League Baseball Championship Series =

2014 Ivy League baseball tournament
- Teams: 2
- Format: Best of three series
- Finals site: Robertson Field at Satow Stadium; New York, NY
- Champions: Columbia (3rd title)
- Winning coach: Brett Boretti (3rd title)
- Attendance: 707

2014 Ivy League baseball standings
	Conf.				Overall
Team	W		L	PCT	W		L	PCT
Lou Gehrig
Columbia ^{x}‍‍‡‍^{y}	15	–	5	.750	29	–	20	.592
Penn ^{x}‍‍‍	15	–	5	.750	24	–	17	.585
Cornell ‍‍‍	9	–	11	.450	18	–	21	.462
Princeton ‍‍‍	8	–	12	.400	14	–	26	.350
Red Rolfe
Dartmouth ^{x}‍‍‍	11	–	9	.550	18	–	21	.462
Yale ^{x}‍‍‍	11	–	9	.550	19	–	22	.463
Brown ‍‍‍	6	–	14	.300	13	–	24	.351
Harvard ‍‍‍	5	–	15	.250	11	–	28	.282
x – Division champion ‡ – Championship Series champion y – Invited to the NCAA tournament Rankings from Collegiate Baseball

The 2014 Ivy League Baseball Championship Series was held at Robertson Field at Satow Stadium on the campus of Columbia in New York, NY on May 10. The series matched the regular season champions of each of the league's two divisions, Columbia and Dartmouth in a rematch of the 2013 edition. Columbia again won the series in two games to claim the Ivy League's automatic berth in the 2014 NCAA Division I baseball tournament.

With the ties for both division leads, tiebreakers were played on the originally scheduled weekend of May 3 and 4 and the Championship series was delayed one week. Tiebreakers were played between Penn and Columbia for the Lou Gehrig Division title and between Yale and Dartmouth to decide the Red Rolfe Division.

Columbia defeated Penn by a score of 4–0 in the tiebreaker for the Lou Gehrig Division. The game was held on May 3 at Meiklejohn Stadium on Penn's campus in Philadelphia, Pennsylvania, with Lions senior David Speer extending his scoreless innings streak to 23, recording 9 strikeouts, and allowing just five hits and two walks. Columbia appears in the championship series for the second year in a row and fifth overall.

In the tiebreaker for the Red Rolfe Division, Dartmouth defeated Yale by a score of 11–4. The game was held on May 4 at Dartmouth's home field, Red Rolfe Field at Biondi Park in Hanover, New Hampshire. Big Green starter Beau Sulser exited in the second inning due to an apparent elbow injury, and was replaced by sophomore Duncan Robinson. Robinson completed 5.1 innings to earn his seventh win, tied for most in the Ivy League in 2014. Dartmouth extended its winning streak to eight games and represents the Red Rolfe Division in the Championship Series for the seventh year in a row.

As Columbia compiled the best record in the Ivy League in 2014, they hosted the series at Robertson Field at Satow Stadium in New York, NY.

== Results ==
Game One

May 10, 2014 12:00 pm
Team	1	2	3	4	5	6	7	8	9	R	H	E
Dartmouth	1	0	0	0	1	0	0	0	0	2	7	0
Columbia	1	0	0	3	1	0	1	0	X	6	10	0
WP: Speer (1–0) LP: Concato (2–3); Home runs: Dartmouth: None; Columbia: Vanderhook, Paller; Boxscore

Game Two

May 10, 2014
Team	1	2	3	4	5	6	7	8	9	R	H	E
Columbia	0	0	0	3	0	0	0	0	1	4	4	1
Dartmouth	0	0	1	0	0	0	0	0	0	1	5	1
WP: Roy (5–4) LP: Robinson (7–3); Home runs: Columbia: Vanderhook, Craig; Dartmouth: None; Attendance: 707; Boxscore
