= 2004 Ivy League Baseball Championship Series =

2004 Ivy League baseball tournament
- Teams: 2
- Format: Best of three series
- Finals site: Red Rolfe Field at Biondi Park; Hanover, NH
- Champions: Princeton (5th title)
- Winning coach: Scott Bradley (4th title)

2004 Ivy League baseball standings
	Conf.						Overall
Team	W		L		T	PCT	W		L		T	PCT
Lou Gehrig
Princeton ^{x}‍‍‡‍^{y}	12	–	8	–	0	.600	28	–	20	–	0	.583
Columbia ‍‍‍	8	–	12	–	0	.400	14	–	28	–	0	.333
Cornell ‍‍‍	7	–	13	–	0	.350	13	–	29	–	0	.310
Penn ‍‍‍	5	–	15	–	0	.250	10	–	27	–	0	.270
Red Rolfe
Dartmouth ^{x}‍‍‍	15	–	5	–	0	.750	25	–	17	–	0	.595
Harvard ‍‍‍	13	–	7	–	0	.650	21	–	18	–	1	.538
Yale ‍‍‍	11	–	9	–	0	.550	19	–	20	–	0	.487
Brown ‍‍‍	9	–	11	–	0	.450	16	–	26	–	0	.381
x – Division champion ‡ – Championship Series champion y – Invited to the NCAA tournament As of June 30, 2004; Rankings from Collegiate Baseball

The 2004 Ivy League Baseball Championship Series took place at Red Rolfe Field at Biondi Park in Hanover, New Hampshire on May 8, 2004. The series matched the regular season champions of each of the league's two divisions. Princeton, the winner of the series, claimed their second consecutive, and fifth overall, title and the Ivy League's automatic berth in the 2004 NCAA Division I baseball tournament. It was Princeton's ninth appearance in the Championship Series, all of which were consecutive.

Dartmouth made their third appearance in the Championship Series, also having lost to Princeton in 2000 and 2001.

== Results ==
Finals
Princeton	14	5	—
Dartmouth	3	4^{10}	—
