= 2015 Ivy League Baseball Championship Series =

2015 Ivy League baseball tournament
- Teams: 2
- Format: Best of three series
- Finals site: Robertson Field at Satow Stadium; New York, NY
- Champions: Columbia (4th title)
- Winning coach: Brett Boretti (4th title)

2015 Ivy League baseball standings
	Conf.				Overall
Team	W		L	PCT	W		L	PCT
Lou Gehrig
Columbia ^{x}‍‍‡‍^{y}	16	–	4	.800	34	–	17	.667
Penn ^{x}‍‍‍	16	–	4	.800	22	–	15	.595
Cornell ‍‍‍	9	–	11	.450	13	–	27	.325
Princeton ‍‍‍	4	–	16	.200	7	–	32	.179
Red Rolfe
Dartmouth ^{x}‍‍‍	16	–	4	.800	21	–	22	.488
Harvard ‍‍‍	7	–	13	.350	18	–	24	.429
Yale ‍‍‍	6	–	14	.300	15	–	23	.395
Brown ‍‍‍	6	–	14	.300	11	–	28	.282
‡ – Championship Series champion y – Invited to the NCAA tournament As of June 3, 2015; Rankings from Collegiate Baseball

The 2015 Ivy League Baseball Championship Series was held at Robertson Field at Satow Stadium, the home field of Columbia in New York, NY. The series matches the regular season champions of each of the league's two divisions, Columbia and Dartmouth. Columbia won the series for the third consecutive year to claim the Ivy League's automatic berth in the 2015 NCAA Division I baseball tournament.

Dartmouth claimed their eighth straight Rolfe Division title, while Columbia and Penn tied for the Gehrig Division lead. The two teams met in a one-game playoff on May 2, with Columbia winning 4–2 to clinch a berth in the Championship Series. The two teams face each other for the Ivy League championship for the third consecutive year.

== Results ==
Game One

May 9, 2015 Noon
Team	1	2	3	4	5	6	7	8	9	R	H	E
Dartmouth	0	0	2	3	0	2	0	0	0	7	8	3
Columbia	0	0	0	0	1	3	0	1	1	6	10	1
WP: D. Robinson LP: G. Thanopoulos Sv: P. Peterson; Home runs: Dar: M. Parisi; Col: R. Paller; Attendance: 778; Notes: Dar. leads 1–0; Boxscore

Game Two

May 9, 2015 3:45 p.m.
Team	1	2	3	4	5	6	7	8	9	R	H	E
Columbia	1	0	0	1	1	0	1	2	1	7	12	0
Dartmouth	0	2	0	0	0	0	0	0	0	2	8	0
WP: K. Roy LP: M. Concato Sv: A. Cline; Home runs: Col: N. Maguire; Dar: None; Attendance: 778; Notes: Series Tied 1–1; Boxscore

Game Three

May 10, 2015 1:00 pm
Team	1	2	3	4	5	6	7	8	9	R	H	E
Dartmouth	0	1	3	1	1	0	0	1	0	7	12	0
Columbia	2	4	2	0	1	1	0	0	X	10	14	3
WP: H. Egly LP: L. Concato; Home runs: Dar: Purritano; Col: Falcone (2), Vandercook, Boyher; Attendance: 508; Boxscore
