= 2010 Ivy League Baseball Championship Series =

2010 Ivy League baseball tournament
- Teams: 2
- Format: Best of three series
- Finals site: Robertson Field at Satow Stadium; New York, New York
- Champions: Dartmouth (2nd title)
- Winning coach: Bob Whalen (2nd title)

2010 Ivy League baseball standings
	Conf.						Overall
Team	W		L		T	PCT	W		L		T	PCT
Lou Gehrig
Columbia ^{x}‍‍‍	15	–	5	–	0	.750	23	–	24	–	0	.489
Penn ‍‍‍	10	–	10	–	0	.500	21	–	20	–	0	.512
Cornell ‍‍‍	8	–	12	–	0	.400	18	–	20	–	0	.474
Princeton ‍‍‍	6	–	14	–	0	.300	12	–	30	–	0	.286
Red Rolfe
Dartmouth ^{x‡y} ‍‍‍	13	–	7	–	0	.650	26	–	18	–	0	.591
Harvard ‍‍‍	10	–	10	–	0	.500	17	–	26	–	0	.395
Brown ‍‍‍	10	–	10	–	0	.500	13	–	31	–	0	.295
Yale ‍‍‍	8	–	12	–	0	.400	21	–	22	–	1	.489
x – Division champion ‡ – Championship Series champion y – Invited to the NCAA tournament As of June 30, 2010; Rankings from Collegiate Baseball

The 2010 Ivy League Baseball Championship Series took place at Robertson Field at Satow Stadium in New York City on May 8 and 9, 2010. The series matched the regular season champions of each of the league's two divisions. Dartmouth, the winner of the series, claimed the Ivy League's automatic berth in the 2010 NCAA Division I baseball tournament. It was Dartmouth's second consecutive, and second overall, coming in their third consecutive appearance.

Columbia made its third appearance, and second in three years in the Championship Series.

== Results ==
Finals
Dartmouth	2	15	11
Columbia	13	10	5
