= 2007 Ivy League Baseball Championship Series =

2007 Ivy League baseball tournament
- Teams: 2
- Format: Best of three series
- Finals site: Murray Stadium; Providence, RI
- Champions: Brown (1st title)
- Winning coach: Marek Drabinski (1st title)

2007 Ivy League baseball standings
	Conf.						Overall
Team	W		L		T	PCT	W		L		T	PCT
Lou Gehrig
Penn ^{x}‍‍‍	12	–	8	–	0	.600	20	–	19	–	0	.513
Princeton ‍‍‍	11	–	9	–	0	.550	20	–	22	–	0	.476
Columbia ‍‍‍	10	–	10	–	0	.500	16	–	28	–	1	.367
Cornell ‍‍‍	8	–	12	–	0	.400	15	–	23	–	0	.395
Red Rolfe
Brown ^{x}‍‍‡‍^{y}	14	–	6	–	0	.700	27	–	21	–	0	.563
Harvard ‍‍‍	12	–	8	–	0	.600	18	–	18	–	0	.500
Yale ‍‍‍	8	–	12	–	0	.400	16	–	28	–	0	.364
Dartmouth ‍‍‍	5	–	15	–	0	.250	8	–	29	–	0	.216
x – Division champion ‡ – Championship Series champion y – Invited to the NCAA tournament As of June 30, 2007; Rankings from Collegiate Baseball

The 2007 Ivy League Baseball Championship Series took place at Murray Stadium in Providence, Rhode Island on May 5, 2007. The series matched the regular season champions of each of the league's two divisions. Brown, the winner of the series, claimed the Ivy League's automatic berth in the 2007 NCAA Division I baseball tournament. It was Brown's first Championship Series victory and their first appearance.

Penn made their third appearance in the Championship Series, having also won 1995 and finished as runner up in 1994.

== Results ==
Finals
Penn	0	6	—
Brown	1	20	—
