= 2002 Ivy League Baseball Championship Series =

2002 Ivy League baseball tournament
- Teams: 2
- Format: Best of three series
- Finals site: Bill Clarke Field; Princeton, NJ
- Champions: Harvard (4th title)
- Winning coach: Joe Walsh (4th title)

2002 Ivy League baseball standings
	Conf.				Overall
Team	W		L	PCT	W		L	PCT
Lou Gehrig
Princeton ^{x}‍‍‍	13	–	7	.650	21	–	23	.477
Penn ‍‍‍	11	–	9	.550	17	–	22	.436
Columbia ‍‍‍	10	–	10	.500	22	–	25	.468
Cornell ‍‍‍	6	–	14	.300	15	–	30	.333
Red Rolfe
Harvard ^{x}‍‍‡‍^{y}	13	–	7	.650	20	–	26	.435
Brown ^{x}‍‍‍	13	–	7	.650	25	–	24	.510
Dartmouth ‍‍‍	9	–	11	.450	21	–	20	.512
Yale ‍‍‍	5	–	15	.250	12	–	27	.308
x – Division champion ‡ – Championship Series champion y – Invited to the NCAA tournament As of June 30, 2002; Rankings from Collegiate Baseball

The 2002 Ivy League Baseball Championship Series took place at Bill Clarke Field in Princeton, New Jersey on May 11, 2002. The series matched the regular season champions of each of the league's two divisions. Harvard, the winner of the series, claimed their fourth title and the Ivy League's automatic berth in the 2002 NCAA Division I baseball tournament. Harvard made their fifth appearance in the series, and faced Princeton for the fifth time in seventh years. Harvard also won in 1997, 1998, and 1999. It was Princeton's seventh appearance in the Championship Series, all of which were consecutive. Harvard won a playoff game against Brown on May 8 in Cambridge, Massachusetts to advance to the Championship Series.

== Results ==
Finals
Harvard	5	2	—
Princeton	1	1	—
