= 2003 Ivy League Baseball Championship Series =

2003 Ivy League baseball tournament
- Teams: 2
- Format: Best of three series
- Finals site: Bill Clarke Field; Princeton, NJ
- Champions: Princeton (4th title)
- Winning coach: Scott Bradley (3rd title)

2003 Ivy League baseball standings
	Conf.						Overall
Team	W		L		T	PCT	W		L		T	PCT
Lou Gehrig
Princeton ^{x}‍‍‡‍^{y}	15	–	5	–	0	.750	27	–	23	–	0	.540
Penn ‍‍‍	12	–	8	–	0	.600	22	–	17	–	0	.564
Columbia ‍‍‍	9	–	11	–	0	.450	21	–	27	–	0	.438
Cornell ‍‍‍	9	–	11	–	0	.450	16	–	20	–	1	.446
Red Rolfe
Harvard ^{x}‍‍‍	11	–	9	–	0	.550	20	–	23	–	0	.465
Dartmouth ‍‍‍	10	–	10	–	0	.500	17	–	19	–	0	.472
Brown ‍‍‍	8	–	12	–	0	.400	18	–	28	–	1	.394
Yale ‍‍‍	6	–	14	–	0	.300	16	–	24	–	0	.400
x – Division champion ‡ – Championship Series champion y – Invited to the NCAA tournament As of June 30, 2003; Rankings from Collegiate Baseball

The 2003 Ivy League Baseball Championship Series took place at Bill Clarke Field in Princeton, New Jersey, on May 10 and 11, 2003. The series matched the regular season champions of each of the league's two divisions. Princeton, the winner of the series, claimed their fourth title and the Ivy League's automatic berth in the 2003 NCAA Division I baseball tournament. It was Princeton's eighth appearance in the Championship Series, all of which were consecutive.

Harvard made their sixth appearance in the series, and faced Princeton for the sixth time in eight years. Harvard won in 1997, 1998, 1999, and 2002.

== Results ==
Finals
Harvard	2	4	2
Princeton	5	3	5
