= 2006 Ivy League Baseball Championship Series =

2006 Ivy League baseball tournament
- Teams: 2
- Format: Best of three series
- Finals site: Joseph J. O'Donnell Field; Cambridge, MA
- Champions: Princeton (6th title)
- Winning coach: Scott Bradley (5th title)

2006 Ivy League baseball standings
	Conf.						Overall
Team	W		L		T	PCT	W		L		T	PCT
Lou Gehrig
Princeton ^{x}‍‍‡‍^{y}	11	–	9	–	0	.550	18	–	26	–	0	.409
Penn ‍‍‍	7	–	13	–	0	.350	12	–	27	–	0	.308
Columbia ‍‍‍	6	–	14	–	0	.300	13	–	32	–	0	.289
Cornell ‍‍‍	6	–	14	–	0	.300	10	–	29	–	0	.256
Red Rolfe
Harvard ^{x}‍‍‍	14	–	6	–	0	.700	21	–	20	–	1	.512
Dartmouth ‍‍‍	13	–	7	–	0	.650	20	–	19	–	0	.513
Brown ‍‍‍	12	–	8	–	0	.600	16	–	24	–	0	.400
Yale ‍‍‍	11	–	9	–	0	.550	26	–	19	–	0	.578
x – Division champion ‡ – Championship Series champion y – Invited to the NCAA tournament As of June 30, 2006; Rankings from Collegiate Baseball

The 2006 Ivy League Baseball Championship Series took place at Joseph J. O'Donnell Field in Cambridge, Massachusetts on May 6, 2006. The series matched the regular season champions of each of the league's two divisions. Princeton, the winner of the series, claimed their sixth title and the Ivy League's automatic berth in the 2006 NCAA Division I baseball tournament. It was Princeton's fifth Championship Series victory in seven years and their tenth appearance in eleven seasons.

Harvard made their eighth appearance in the Championship Series, having won the title in 2005.

== Results ==
Finals
Princeton	9	8	—
Harvard	3	2	—
