= 1998 Ivy League Baseball Championship Series =

1998 Ivy League baseball tournament
- Teams: 2
- Format: Best of three series
- Finals site: Yale Field; New Haven, Connecticut
- Champions: Harvard (2nd title)
- Winning coach: Joe Walsh (2nd title)

1998 Ivy League baseball standings
	Conf.						Overall
Team	W		L		T	PCT	W		L		T	PCT
Lou Gehrig
Princeton ^{x}‍‍‍	13	–	7	–	0	.650	25	–	14	–	0	.641
Cornell ‍‍‍	12	–	8	–	0	.600	18	–	18	–	1	.500
Penn ‍‍‍	9	–	11	–	0	.450	14	–	21	–	1	.403
Columbia ‍‍‍	5	–	15	–	0	.250	10	–	31	–	0	.244
Red Rolfe
Harvard ^{x}‍‍‡‍^{y}	16	–	4	–	0	.800	36	–	12	–	0	.750
Yale ‍‍‍	11	–	9	–	0	.550	21	–	21	–	0	.500
Dartmouth ‍‍‍	7	–	13	–	0	.350	23	–	18	–	0	.561
Brown ‍‍‍	7	–	13	–	0	.350	12	–	34	–	0	.261
x – Division champion ‡ – Championship Series champion y – Invited to the NCAA tournament As of June 30, 1998; Rankings from Collegiate Baseball

The 1998 Ivy League Baseball Championship Series took place at Yale Field in New Haven, Connecticut, on May 12, 1998. The series matched the regular season champions of each of the league's two divisions. Harvard, the winner of the series, claimed their second consecutive, and second overall, title and the Ivy League's automatic berth in the 1998 NCAA Division I baseball tournament. It was Harvard's third appearance in the Championship Series, all of which were consecutive, and all of which matched them against Princeton.

Princeton also made their third appearance in the Championship Series. The Tigers won the event in 1996.

== Results ==
Finals
Princeton	6	4	—
Harvard	13	13	—
