= 2018 Ivy League Baseball Championship Series =

2018 Ivy League baseball tournament
- Teams: 2
- Format: Best of three series
- Finals site: Yale Field; New Haven, CT
- Champions: Columbia (5th title)
- Winning coach: Brett Boretti (5th title)
- Television: Ivy League DN

2018 Ivy League baseball standings
	Conf.						Overall
Team	W		L		T	PCT	W		L		T	PCT
Yale ‍†‍‍	15	–	6	–	0	.714	22	–	21	–	0	.512
Columbia ^{‡y} ‍‍‍	13	–	8	–	0	.619	20	–	28	–	0	.417
Harvard ‍‍‍	12	–	9	–	0	.571	22	–	20	–	0	.524
Dartmouth ‍‍‍	12	–	8	–	1	.595	17	–	22	–	1	.438
Penn ‍‍‍	9	–	11	–	1	.452	16	–	25	–	1	.393
Cornell ‍‍‍	9	–	12	–	0	.429	14	–	22	–	1	.392
Princeton ‍‍‍	7	–	14	–	0	.333	10	–	27	–	0	.270
Brown ‍‍‍	6	–	15	–	0	.286	11	–	26	–	0	.297
‡ – Championship Series champion y – Invited to the NCAA tournament As of May 28, 2018; Rankings from Collegiate Baseball

The 2018 Ivy League Baseball Championship Series was held at Yale Field on May 22 and May 23, 2018. The series matched the top two teams from the Ivy League's round robin regular season, Yale and Columbia. Columbia swept the series and claimed the Ivy League's automatic berth in the 2018 NCAA Division I baseball tournament.

== Results ==
Game One

May 22, 2018 12:05 pm
Team	1	2	3	4	5	6	7	8	9	R	H	E
Columbia	0	0	0	0	0	0	1	3	0	4	10	0
Yale	0	0	0	0	0	0	0	0	0	0	4	1
WP: Egly (3–3) LP: Politz (5–4); Attendance: 781; Boxscore

Game Two

May 23, 2018
Team	1	2	3	4	5	6	7	8	9	10	11	12	13	14	15	R	H	E
Columbia	0	1	0	0	0	0	0	0	0	0	0	0	0	0	1	2	10	0
Yale	1	0	0	0	0	0	0	0	0	0	0	0	0	0	0	1	8	0
WP: Hall (3–0) LP: Stiegler (0–3); Home runs: Columbia: Robinette; Yale: None; Boxscore
