= 2005 Ivy League Baseball Championship Series =

2004 Ivy League baseball tournament
- Teams: 2
- Format: Best of three series
- Finals site: Joseph J. O'Donnell Field; Cambridge, MA
- Champions: Harvard (5th title)
- Winning coach: Joe Walsh (5th title)

2005 Ivy League baseball standings
	Conf.				Overall
Team	W		L	PCT	W		L	PCT
Lou Gehrig
Cornell ^{x}‍‍‍	11	–	9	.550	17	–	24	.415
Princeton ‍‍‍	10	–	10	.500	17	–	24	.415
Penn ‍‍‍	7	–	13	.350	11	–	26	.297
Columbia ‍‍‍	5	–	15	.250	10	–	31	.244
Red Rolfe
Harvard ^{x}‍‍‡‍^{y}	15	–	5	.750	29	–	17	.630
Brown ‍‍‍	14	–	6	.700	22	–	19	.537
Yale ‍‍‍	10	–	10	.500	23	–	17	.575
Dartmouth ‍‍‍	8	–	12	.400	14	–	21	.400
x – Division champion ‡ – Championship Series champion y – Invited to the NCAA tournament As of June 30, 2005; Rankings from Collegiate Baseball

The 2005 Ivy League Baseball Championship Series took place at Joseph J. O'Donnell Field in Cambridge, Massachusetts on May 9, 2005. The series matched the regular season champions of each of the league's two divisions. Harvard, the winner of the series, claimed their fifth title and the Ivy League's automatic berth in the 2005 NCAA Division I baseball tournament. It was Harvard's seventh appearance in the Championship Series and the first time they did not face Princeton in the matchup.

Cornell made their first appearance in the Championship Series.

== Results ==
Finals
Cornell	2	0	—
Harvard	4	2	—
