= 2016 Ivy League Baseball Championship Series =

2016 Ivy League baseball tournament
- Teams: 2
- Format: Best of three series
- Finals site: Bill Clarke Field; Princeton, NJ
- Champions: Princeton Tigers (8th title)

2016 Ivy League baseball standings
	Conf.						Overall
Team	W		L		T	PCT	W		L		T	PCT
Lou Gehrig
Princeton ^{x}‍‍‡‍^{y}	13	–	7	–	0	.650	24	–	21	–	0	.533
Penn ‍‍‍	10	–	10	–	0	.500	19	–	22	–	0	.463
Columbia ‍‍‍	10	–	10	–	0	.500	17	–	24	–	0	.415
Cornell ‍‍‍	7	–	13	–	0	.350	14	–	24	–	0	.368
Red Rolfe
Dartmouth ^{x}‍‍‍	11	–	9	–	0	.550	18	–	25	–	0	.419
Yale ^{x}‍‍‍	11	–	9	–	0	.550	19	–	28	–	1	.406
Harvard ‍‍‍	9	–	11	–	0	.450	17	–	24	–	0	.415
Brown ‍‍‍	9	–	11	–	0	.450	15	–	24	–	0	.385
x – Division champion ‡ – Championship Series champion y – Invited to the NCAA tournament As of June 5, 2016; Rankings from Collegiate Baseball

The 2016 Ivy League Baseball Championship Series was held at Bill Clarke Field, home field of the Gehrig Division champion Princeton Tigers on May 14 and 15. The series matched the regular season champions of each of the league's two divisions. Princeton won their league-best eighth championship series and claimed the Ivy League's automatic berth in the 2016 NCAA Division I baseball tournament.

Princeton won the Gehrig Division while Dartmouth and Yale tied for the Rolfe Division title with identical 11–9 records. Yale won a one-game playoff on May 7 to advance to the Championship Series.

== Results ==
Game One

May 14, 2016 12:00 pm
Team	1	2	3	4	5	6	7	8	9	R	H	E
Yale	0	2	4	0	0	0	0	0	2	8	11	1
Princeton	0	2	1	0	0	2	0	2	0	7	9	0
WP: Kukowski LP: Thomson Sv: Brodkowitz; Attendance: 350; Boxscore

Game Two

May 15, 2016
Team	1	2	3	4	5	6	7	8	9	R	H	E
Princeton	0	4	1	1	0	0	0	0	0	6	13	1
Yale	0	0	1	0	0	1	0	0	0	2	6	1
WP: Powers LP: Wanger; Home runs: P: None; Y: O'Neill; Attendance: 235; Boxscore

Game Three

May 15, 2016 1:00 pm
Team	1	2	3	4	5	6	7	8	9	R	H	E
Yale	1	0	0	0	0	0	0	0	0	1	8	1
Princeton	0	0	0	0	0	0	0	0	2	2	6	0
WP: Mingo LP: Ford; Attendance: 275; Boxscore
