= 1997 Ivy League Baseball Championship Series =

1997 Ivy League baseball tournament
- Teams: 2
- Format: Best of three series
- Finals site: Joseph J. O'Donnell Field; Cambridge, Massachusetts
- Champions: Harvard (1st title)
- Winning coach: Joe Walsh (1st title)

1997 Ivy League baseball standings
	Conf.						Overall
Team	W		L		T	PCT	W		L		T	PCT
Lou Gehrig
Princeton ^{x}‍‍‡‍^{y}	10	–	10	–	0	.500	20	–	25	–	0	.444
Penn ^{x}‍‍‍	10	–	10	–	0	.500	19	–	21	–	0	.475
Cornell ‍‍‍	7	–	13	–	0	.350	13	–	26	–	0	.333
Columbia ‍‍‍	6	–	14	–	0	.300	12	–	25	–	1	.329
Red Rolfe
Harvard ^{x}‍‍‍	18	–	2	–	0	.900	34	–	16	–	0	.680
Yale ‍‍‍	16	–	4	–	0	.800	24	–	19	–	0	.558
Dartmouth ‍‍‍	11	–	9	–	0	.550	22	–	16	–	0	.579
Brown ‍‍‍	2	–	18	–	0	.100	5	–	37	–	0	.119
x – Division champion ‡ – Championship Series champion y – Invited to the NCAA tournament As of June 30, 1997; Rankings from Collegiate Baseball

The 1997 Ivy League Baseball Championship Series took place at Joseph J. O'Donnell Field in Cambridge, Massachusetts on May 10 and 11, 1997. The series matched the regular season champions of each of the league's two divisions. Harvard, the winner of the series, claimed their first title and the Ivy League's automatic berth in the 1997 NCAA Division I baseball tournament. It was Harvard's second appearance in the Championship Series, both of which were consecutive, and both of which matched them against Princeton.

Princeton defeated Penn, 11–3, on May 7 in a one-game playoff for the Gehrig Division. The Tigers also made their second appearance in the Championship Series. Princeton won the event in 1996.

== Results ==
Finals
Princeton	2	2	4
Harvard	1	4	22
