= 1999 Ivy League Baseball Championship Series =

1999 Ivy League baseball tournament
- Teams: 2
- Format: Best of three series
- Finals site: Joseph J. O'Donnell Field; Cambridge, Massachusetts
- Champions: Harvard (3rd title)
- Winning coach: Joe Walsh (3rd title)

1999 Ivy League baseball standings
	Conf.				Overall
Team	W		L	PCT	W		L	PCT
Lou Gehrig
Princeton ^{x}‍‍‍	15	–	5	.750	25	–	20	.556
Columbia ‍‍‍	7	–	13	.350	13	–	27	.325
Cornell ‍‍‍	7	–	13	.350	12	–	28	.300
Penn ‍‍‍	6	–	14	.300	9	–	28	.243
Red Rolfe
Harvard ^{x}‍‍‡‍^{y}	16	–	4	.800	28	–	20	.583
Brown ‍‍‍	13	–	7	.650	23	–	18	.561
Dartmouth ‍‍‍	9	–	11	.450	17	–	24	.415
Yale ‍‍‍	6	–	14	.300	16	–	29	.356
x – Division champion ‡ – Championship Series champion y – Invited to the NCAA tournament As of June 30, 1999; Rankings from Collegiate Baseball

The 1999 Ivy League Baseball Championship Series took place at Joseph J. O'Donnell Field in Cambridge, Massachusetts on May 8 and 9, 1999. The series matched the regular season champions of each of the league's two divisions. Harvard, the winner of the series, claimed their third consecutive, and third overall, title and the Ivy League's automatic berth in the 1999 NCAA Division I baseball tournament. It was Harvard's fourth appearance in the Championship Series, all of which were consecutive, and all of which matched them against Princeton.

Princeton also made their fourth appearance in the Championship Series. The Tigers won the event in 1996.

== Results ==
Finals
Princeton	7	7	4
Harvard	8	6	5
