= 1996 Ivy League Baseball Championship Series =

1996 Ivy League baseball tournament
- Teams: 2
- Format: Best of three series
- Finals site: Bill Clarke Field; Princeton, New Jersey
- Champions: Princeton (1st title)
- Winning coach: Tom O'Connell (1st title)

1996 Ivy League baseball standings
	Conf.				Overall
Team	W		L	PCT	W		L	PCT
Lou Gehrig
Princeton ^{x}‍‍‡‍^{y}	13	–	7	.650	26	–	21	.553
Penn ‍‍‍	13	–	7	.650	25	–	17	.595
Cornell ‍‍‍	8	–	12	.400	17	–	27	.386
Columbia ‍‍‍	7	–	13	.350	13	–	29	.310
Red Rolfe
Harvard ^{x}‍‍‍	14	–	6	.700	23	–	17	.575
Yale ‍‍‍	11	–	9	.550	24	–	18	.571
Dartmouth ‍‍‍	8	–	12	.400	12	–	25	.324
Brown ‍‍‍	6	–	14	.300	12	–	25	.324
x – Division champion ‡ – Championship Series champion y – Invited to the NCAA tournament As of June 30, 1996; Rankings from Collegiate Baseball

The 1996 Ivy League Baseball Championship Series took place at Bill Clarke Field in Princeton, New Jersey on May 11, 1996. The series matched the regular season champions of each of the league's two divisions. Princeton, the winner of the series, claimed their first title and the Ivy League's automatic berth in the 1996 NCAA Division I baseball tournament. The Tigers first defeated Penn, 5–4, on May 9 to win the Gehrig Division. It was Princeton's first appearance in the Championship Series.

Harvard also made their first appearance in the Championship Series. It was the first time in the four year old event that Yale did not participate.

== Results ==
Finals
Harvard	6	0	—
Princeton	15	1	—
