= Bob Whalen =

American college baseball coach (born 1957)

Biographical details
- Born: October 15, 1957 (age 69); Needham, Massachusetts, U.S.
- Education: Maine '79 (B.A.) '86 (M.B.A.)

Playing career
- 1976–1979: Maine

Coaching career (HC unless noted)
- 1982–1989: Maine (asst.)
- 1990–2025: Dartmouth

Head coaching record
- Overall: 653–699–3
- Tournaments: NCAA: 1–4; Ivy Champ. Series: 9–20

Accomplishments and honors

Championships
- Ivy Championship Series: 2009, 2010; Rolfe Division: 2000, 2001, 2004, 2008, 2009, 2010, 2011, 2012, 2013, 2014, 2015

Awards
- NEIBA Coach of the Year: 2008; Jack Butterfield Award: 2010

Bob Whalen (born October 15, 1957) is an American college baseball coach who was the head coach of Dartmouth from the start of the 1990 season until the end of the 2025 season. Under Whalen, the Big Green appeared in two NCAA tournaments. A Maine alumnus, Whalen worked as an assistant coach there from 1982 to 1989.

== Playing career ==
Whalen played college baseball under head coach John Winkin at Maine from 1976 to 1979, appearing on the school's 1976 College World Series team. His teammates at Maine included Red Sox coach Brian Butterfield, Clemson head coach Jack Leggett, and major leaguer Bert Roberge.

== Coaching career ==
=== Assistant coaching ===
After working as a high school coach following graduation, Whalen began his college coaching career prior to the start of the 1982 season as an assistant at Maine. He coached at Maine through the end of the 1989 season and was associate head coach for his final three seasons there. During his tenure, Maine reached four College World Series.

While a Maine assistant, Whalen also worked as an American Legion baseball coach and was the head coach of the Cape Cod Baseball League's Chatham Anglers from 1988 to 1989.

=== Dartmouth ===
When Mike Walsh left Dartmouth in late 1989 to become the athletic director at Washington & Lee, the school hired Whalen to replace him. Whalen said when he was hired, "I'm excited about it. I guess I feel here the way I first did when I went to Maine as an assistant. The only thing you can ask for is a chance."

In the 1990s, Dartmouth finished no higher than second in the Rolfe Division. The team had three 20-win seasons (1990, 1997, 1998) but did not reach the postseason. In this stretch, Whalen had two major award winners. Brian Nickerson was named Ivy Rookie of the Year in 1997, and Greg Gilmer won the Blair Bat in 1994 as the league's leading hitter (.476). Whalen also had three players selected in the MLB draft. Mark Johnson, a 20th-round selection of the Pirates in 1990, later played in Major League Baseball.

The Big Green had more success in the early 2000s, winning Rolfe Division titles in 2000, 2001, and 2004. In 2000, the team went 29–14 (17–3 Ivy), winning the division by six games over second-place Brown. In the Ivy Championship Series, however, it was swept by Gehrig Division champion Princeton. In 2001, the team shared the division title with Brown but defeated the Bears, 7–2, in a one-game playoff to advance to the championship series. The program hosted the series at Red Rolfe Field for the first time. There, it won its opener against Princeton, 6–5, but dropped consecutive games and lost the series. In 2004, Dartmouth went 25–17 (15–5 Ivy) and won the division outright but was again defeated by Princeton in the championship series. Shortstop Ed Lucas, who was drafted in 2004, went on to play for the Miami Marlins.

When Maine head coach Paul Kostacopoulos left for Navy at the end of the 2005 season, Whalen was one of the finalists to replace him, but the school instead hired Manhattan head coach Steve Trimper.

In the late 2000s, Whalen oversaw extensive $5.2 million renovations to Red Rolfe Field at Biondi Park, Dartmouth's home venue. The renovations added an artificial turf surface, stadium seating, and a new electronic scoreboard, among other features.

After last place finishes in 2005 and 2007, Dartmouth was consistently the best program in the Rolfe Division in the late 2000s and early 2010s. From 2008 to 2014, the Big Green won seven straight Rolfe Division titles. Whalen received the NEIBA Coach of the Year award in 2008 and the Jack Butterfield Award in 2010. The Big Green won the Ivy League Championship Series twice in this stretch, defeating Cornell in 2009 and Columbia in 2010, to advance to the NCAA tournament. As the four seed at the 2009 Chapel Hill Regional, Dartmouth went 0–2, losing games to host North Carolina and third-seeded Kansas. As the four seed at the 2010 Coral Gables Regional, Dartmouth went 1–2; the team dropped its opener to host Miami (FL), then eliminated third-seeded FIU before being eliminated by Texas A&M.

In the first game of an April 21, 2014, doubleheader, Dartmouth defeated Brown, 7–0, to give Whalen his 500th career win. The Big Green's Michael Concato threw a four-hit shutout in the game.

From 2000 to 2014, 18 of Whalen's players have been selected in the Major League Baseball draft. The highest selections, eighth-rounders Ed Lucas and Kyle Hendricks, went on to appear in Major League Baseball. In the same stretch, the program has had two Ivy Pitchers of the Year, three Players of the Year, and five Rookies of the Year.

== Head coaching record ==
=== NCAA ===
Below is a table of Whalen's yearly records as a collegiate head baseball coach.

Record table
Season	Team	Overall	Conference	Standing	Postseason
Dartmouth Big Green (Eastern Intercollegiate Baseball League) (1990–1992)
1990	Dartmouth	21–17	10–8	4th	
1991	Dartmouth	15–21	9–7	T-3rd	
1992	Dartmouth	9–25	6–8	T-5th	
Dartmouth:			25–23		
Dartmouth Big Green (Ivy League) (1993–2025)
1993	Dartmouth	14–19	8–12	4th (Rolfe)	
1994	Dartmouth	16–21	9–11	2nd (Rolfe)	
1995	Dartmouth	19–17	12–8	2nd (Rolfe)	
1996	Dartmouth	12–25	8–12	3rd (Rolfe)	
1997	Dartmouth	22–16	11–9	3rd (Rolfe)	
1998	Dartmouth	23–18	7–13	T-3rd (Rolfe)	
1999	Dartmouth	17–24	9–11	3rd (Rolfe)	
2000	Dartmouth	29–14	17–3	1st (Rolfe)	Ivy Championship Series
2001	Dartmouth	22–18	12–8	T-1st (Rolfe)	Ivy Championship Series
2002	Dartmouth	21–20	9–11	3rd (Rolfe)	
2003	Dartmouth	17–19	10–10	2nd (Rolfe)	
2004	Dartmouth	25–17	15–5	1st (Rolfe)	Ivy Championship Series
2005	Dartmouth	14–21	8–12	4th (Rolfe)	
2006	Dartmouth	20–19	13–7	2nd (Rolfe)	
2007	Dartmouth	8–29–1	5–15	4th (Rolfe)	
2008	Dartmouth	25–17	15–5	1st (Rolfe)	Ivy Championship Series
2009	Dartmouth	27–18	16–4	1st (Rolfe)	NCAA Regional
2010	Dartmouth	27–19	13–7	1st (Rolfe)	NCAA Regional
2011	Dartmouth	30–12	14–6	1st (Rolfe)	Ivy Championship Series
2012	Dartmouth	24–18	14–6	1st (Rolfe)	Ivy Championship Series
2013	Dartmouth	32–9	15–5	1st (Rolfe)	Ivy Championship Series
2014	Dartmouth	18–21	11–9	T-1st (Rolfe)	Ivy Championship Series
2015	Dartmouth	21–22	16–4	1st (Rolfe)	Ivy Championship Series
2016	Dartmouth	18–25	11–9	T-1st (Rolfe)	
2017	Dartmouth	22–17–1	11–9	2nd (Rolfe)	
2018	Dartmouth	17–22–1	12–8–1	4th	
2019	Dartmouth	15–26	8–13	T-7th	
2020	Dartmouth	2–5	0–0		Season canceled due to COVID-19
2021	Dartmouth	0–0	0–0		Ivy League opted-out of the season
2022	Dartmouth	24–19	14–7	3rd	
2023	Dartmouth	3–38	2–19	8th	
2024	Dartmouth	13–26	7–14	7th	
2025	Dartmouth	11–25	8–13	T–5th	
Dartmouth:		653–699–3	378–285–1		
Total:		653–699–3			
National champion Postseason invitational champion Conference regular season champion Conference regular season and conference tournament champion Division regular season champion Division regular season and conference tournament champion Conference tournament champion

=== Collegiate summer ===
Below is a table of Whalen's records as a collegiate summer baseball head coach.

Season	Team	Record	Standing	playoffs
Cape Cod League
1988	Chatham	19–24	4th (East)	
1989	Chatham	22–20–2	T-2nd (East)	Play-in game
Total		41–42-2		

== Personal ==
Whalen's father, Bob "Chick" Whalen, was the scouting director for the Pittsburgh Pirates. Chick died in 1993.

Whalen is renowned for his detailed practice plans and inventive bunt defense plays.

== See also ==
- List of current NCAA Division I baseball coaches
- Dartmouth Big Green
