= John Stuper =

American baseball player (born 1957)

- Pitcher
- Born: May 9, 1957 (age 69); Butler, Pennsylvania, U.S.
- Batted: Right Threw: Right

MLB debut
- June 1, 1982, for the St. Louis Cardinals

Last MLB appearance
- October 4, 1985, for the Cincinnati Reds

MLB statistics
- Win–loss record: 32–28
- Earned run average: 3.96
- Strikeouts: 191
- Stats at Baseball Reference

Teams
- As player: St. Louis Cardinals (1982–1984); Cincinnati Reds (1985); As coach: Butler County CC (1986–1991); Yale (1993–2022)

Career highlights and awards
- World Series champion (1982)

John Anton Stuper (born May 9, 1957) is an American former baseball coach and pitcher. He attended Point Park University before playing professionally from 1982 to 1985 for the St. Louis Cardinals and the Cincinnati Reds. He then served as the head coach of the Yale Bulldogs (1993–2022).

== Playing career ==
=== Pittsburgh ===
Stuper was originally drafted by the Pittsburgh Pirates on June 6, 1978. He was traded on January 25, 1979, to the St. Louis Cardinals for Tommy Sandt before making it to the majors.

=== St. Louis Cardinals ===
He was 25 years old when he broke into Major League Baseball on June 1, 1982, for the St. Louis Cardinals. In his debut he pitched 8 innings against the San Francisco Giants but ended with a no-decision as Jack Clark singled in Darrell Evans in the top of the 11th and the Giants beat the Cardinals 4–3 in St. Louis.

On October 19, 1982, Stuper pitched a complete game as the Cardinals defeated the Milwaukee Brewers, 13–1, in the sixth game of the 1982 World Series to tie the series at three games each. Stuper retired thirteen batters in a row, tying a rookie record set by Dickey Kerr for the White Sox in 1919. The Cardinals won the seventh game the following day by a score of 6–3.

=== Cincinnati Reds ===
On September 9, 1984, he was traded by the St. Louis Cardinals to the Cincinnati Reds for Paul Householder.

=== Montreal Expos ===
On December 19, 1985, he was traded with Dann Bilardello, Andy McGaffigan, and Jay Tibbs to the Montreal Expos for Bill Gullickson and Sal Butera, but never played a game for the Expos.

== Career statistics ==
Stuper was listed by Sports Illustrated as among the ten best performances by a rookie pitcher in the history of post-season play for his Game 6 complete game.

W	L	G	GS	CG	SHO	IP	H	ER	SO	ERA	WHIP	WP
32	28	111	76	9	1	495	528	218	191	3.96	1.436	14

162-game averages

W	L	G	GS	CG	SHO	IP	H	ER	SO	ERA	WHIP	WP
11	10	40	27	3	0	180	192	79	69	3.96	1.436	5

In 1983 Stuper finished 9th in the National League with 8 wild pitches. His lifetime batting average was .112 (15/134).

== Coaching career ==
=== Butler County Community College ===
A month after being released by the Expos in 1986, Stuper was hired as the head baseball coach at Butler County Community College. He said he intended to coach at BCCC while working on his master's degree at Slippery Rock University. Stuper implemented lessons from his former Cardinals manager, Whitey Herzog, and oversaw aggressive Butler teams that set school records in runs and stolen bases. He led the school to a record of 92–68.

=== St. Louis Cardinals ===
Stuper served as a pitching coach in the Cardinals farm system in 1991 and 1992. He spent the first year in the Florida State League and the second year in the South Atlantic League.

=== Yale ===
Stuper served as the 13th head coach for the Yale Bulldogs baseball team. Stuper led the Elis to three Red Rolfe Division titles and two league championships. His 2017 squad was his best, winning a school-record 34 games, earning an NCAA Regional appearance, and setting numerous school records, including 160 stolen bases in 44 games. He earned 1993 New England Division I Coach of the Year and Northeast Region Division I Coach of the Year honors. He finished his Yale career with an Ivy League conference record of 237–261, and he is the winningest coach in school history with an overall record of 535–610.

=== Head coaching records ===
The following is a table of Stuper's yearly records as an NCAA Division I head baseball coach.

Record table
Season	Team	Overall	Conference	Standing	Postseason
Yale Bulldogs (Ivy League) (1993–2022)
1993	Yale	33–11	16–4	1st (Rolfe)	Central I Regional
1994	Yale	24–19	14–6	1st (Rolfe)	Ivy League Championship Series
1995	Yale	23–20	13–7	1st (Rolfe)	Ivy League Championship Series
1996	Yale	24–18	11–9	2nd (Rolfe)	
1997	Yale	24–19	16–4	2nd (Rolfe)	
1998	Yale	21–21	11–9	2nd (Rolfe)	
1999	Yale	16–29	6–14	4th (Rolfe)	
2000	Yale	13–31	3–17	4th (Rolfe)	
2001	Yale	12–22	6–14	4th (Rolfe)	
2002	Yale	12–27	5–15	4th (Rolfe)	
2003	Yale	16–24	6–14	4th (Rolfe)	
2004	Yale	19–20	11–9	3rd (Rolfe)	
2005	Yale	23–17	10–10	3rd (Rolfe)	
2006	Yale	26–19	11–9	4th (Rolfe)	
2007	Yale	16–27	8–12	3rd (Rolfe)	
2008	Yale	20–24–1	9–10–1	2nd (Rolfe)	
2009	Yale	13–24	7–13	4th (Rolfe)	
2010	Yale	21–22–1	8–12	4th (Rolfe)	
2011	Yale	23–19	11–9	2nd (Rolfe)	
2012	Yale	13–31	5–15	4th (Rolfe)	
2013	Yale	13–25	10–10	2nd (Rolfe)	
2014	Yale	19–22	11–9	T-1st (Rolfe)	Rolfe Division Playoff
2015	Yale	15–23	6–14	T-3rd (Rolfe)	
2016	Yale	19–28–1	11–9	T-1st (Rolfe)	Ivy League Championship Series
2017	Yale	34–18	16–4	1st (Rolfe)	NCAA Regional
2018	Yale	22–20	15–6	1st	Ivy League Championship Series
2019	Yale	18–23	12–8	3rd	
2020	Yale	3–7	0–0		Season canceled due to COVID-19
2021	Yale	0–0	0–0		Ivy League opted-out of the season
2022	Yale	20–18	10–11	T-4th	
Yale:		555–628–2	278–283–1		
Total:		555–628–2			
National champion Postseason invitational champion Conference regular season champion Conference regular season and conference tournament champion Division regular season champion Division regular season and conference tournament champion Conference tournament champion
