= Brett Boretti =

American college baseball coach (born 1971)

Current position
- Title: Head coach
- Team: Columbia
- Conference: Ivy League
- Record: 409–430–1 (.488)

Biographical details
- Born: December 14, 1971 (age 54); Beverly, Massachusetts, U.S.
- Education: Davidson '94 (B.A.)

Playing career

Football
- 1990: Davidson

Baseball
- 1991–1994: Davidson
- Positions: Fullback (football); Catcher (baseball)

Coaching career (HC unless noted)
- 1995: Endicott (asst.)
- 1996–1998: Davidson (asst.)
- 1999–2000: Brown (asst.)
- 2001–2005: Franklin & Marshall
- 2006–present: Columbia

Head coaching record
- Overall: 525–512–1 (.506)
- Tournaments: NCAA D1: 6–16; NCAA D3: 0–2

Accomplishments and honors

Championships
- Ivy Champ. Series: 2008, 2013, 2014, 2015, 2018, 2022, 2025; Regular season: 2025; Gehrig Division: 2008, 2010, 2013, 2014, 2015; Centennial: 2002, 2005; Centennial Tournament: 2005

Awards
- Ivy League Coach of the Year (2015, 2018, 2022, 2024)

Brett Boretti (born December 14, 1971) is an American college baseball coach who has been the head coach of Columbia since the start of the 2006 season. Prior to that, he was the head coach at Division III Franklin & Marshall from 2001 to 2005. As a head coach, Boretti has led teams to four NCAA tournaments, three of them in Division I.

== Playing career ==
Boretti attended Davidson College, where he graduated from in 1994. He played football during his freshman year and baseball for all four years. A catcher, he was named First-Team All-Southern Conference as both a junior and a senior. He also spent time in the Cape Cod Baseball League in 1992 and 1993 with the Wareham Gatemen and was named a league all-star in 1993.

He had a short career in professional baseball. He played for the Brainerd Bears in the short-lived North Central League in 1994; he hit .283 and drove in 31 runs and was named a league all-star. In the midst of the 1994–95 Major League Baseball strike, when owners threatened to play the 1995 season with replacement players, Boretti spent spring training with the Cleveland Indians.

== Coaching career ==
=== Assistant positions ===
Boretti's coaching career began at Endicott, a Division III school located in his hometown of Beverly, Massachusetts. After spending the 1995 season at Endicott, he was an assistant at Davidson from 1996 to 1998 and Brown from 1999 to 2000.

=== Franklin & Marshall ===
Boretti's first head coaching position came at Division III Franklin & Marshall, where he replaced Mark Cole ahead of the 2001 season. Boretti spent five seasons at the school, where he had an overall record of 116–82.

In 2002, Boretti's second season, the Diplomats went 31–10 and shared the Centennial Conference title with Johns Hopkins. The team made the conference tournament, where it lost in the second round. In 2005, Franklin & Marshall won the Centennial outright and defeated Johns Hopkins in the conference championship series to receive an automatic bid to the NCAA tournament. There, it lost a pair of 1–0 games to Rowan (in 10 innings) and Messiah.

=== Columbia ===
Boretti was hired at Division I Columbia ahead of the 2006 season; he replaced Paul Fernandes, who had been promoted to associate athletic director.

After finishing third in the Gehrig Division in 2006 and 2007, the Lions won the division with a 15–5 record in 2008. They defeated Rolfe Division champion Dartmouth in the Ivy Championship Series to advance to the NCAA tournament, Columbia's first since 1976. At the Conway Regional, the Lions lost to host Coastal Carolina, 10–2, and second-seeded East Carolina, 9–0.

The Lions had their first winning season under Boretti in 2010, when they went 27–20 and won the Gehrig Division for the second time. They then lost to Dartmouth in the Ivy Championship.

Under Boretti, Columbia's home field, Robertson Field at Satow Stadium, underwent renovations in 2007 and 2010.

After finishing third in the division in 2011 and 2012, Columbia won back-to-back Ivy League titles in 2013 and 2014, defeating Dartmouth in the championship series in both years. At the Fullerton Regional in 2013, Columbia went 1–2, getting its first NCAA tournament win against third-seeded New Mexico. At the Coral Gables Regional in 2014, the Lions received the third seed and went 0–2.

From 2006 to 2014, six Columbia players have won major awards in the Ivy League, including Dario Pizzano, who was named Rookie of the Year in 2010 and Player of the year in 2012. Four Lions have been selected in the Major League Baseball draft, with the highest pick being Pizzano, a 15th-round selection of the Seattle Mariners in 2012.

== Head coaching record ==
Below is a table of Boretti's yearly records as a collegiate head baseball coach.

Record table
Season	Team	Overall	Conference	Standing	Postseason
Franklin & Marshall (Centennial Conference – DIII) (2001–2005)
2001	Franklin & Marshall	19–20	9–9	T-4th	
2002	Franklin & Marshall	31–10	16–2	T-1st	Centennial Tournament
2003	Franklin & Marshall	17–17	10–8	5th	
2004	Franklin & Marshall	24–19	12–6	T-2nd	Centennial Tournament
2005	Franklin & Marshall	25–16	15–3	1st	NCAA Regional
Franklin & Marshall:		116–82	62–28		
Columbia (Ivy League) (2006–present)
2006	Columbia	13–32	6–14	T-3rd (Gehrig)	
2007	Columbia	16–28–1	10–10	3rd (Gehrig)	
2008	Columbia	22–30	15–5	1st (Gehrig)	NCAA Regional
2009	Columbia	11–32	7–13	3rd (Gehrig)	
2010	Columbia	27–20	15–5	1st (Gehrig)	Ivy Championship Series
2011	Columbia	19–25	9–11	3rd (Gehrig)	
2012	Columbia	21–24	12–8	3rd (Gehrig)	
2013	Columbia	28–20	16–4	1st (Gehrig)	NCAA Regional
2014	Columbia	29–20	15–5	1st (Gehrig)	NCAA Regional
2015	Columbia	37–17	16–4	1st (Gehrig)	NCAA Regional
2016	Columbia	17–24	10–10	T-2nd (Gehrig)	
2017	Columbia	18–23	12–8	T-1st (Gehrig)	Championship Series Playoff Game
2018	Columbia	20–28	13–8	2nd	NCAA Regional
2019	Columbia	19–23	13–8	2nd	Ivy League Championship Series
2020	Columbia	1–7	0–0		Season canceled due to COVID-19
2021	Columbia	0–0	0–0		Ivy League opted-out of the season
2022	Columbia	32–18	17–4	T-1st	NCAA Regional
2023	Columbia	23–22	11–10	4th	Ivy League Tournament
2024	Columbia	26–18	17–4	1st	Ivy League Tournament
2025	Columbia	30–19	16–5	T–1st	NCAA Regional
Columbia:		409–430–1 (.488)	230–136 (.628)		
Total:		525–512–1 (.506)			
National champion Postseason invitational champion Conference regular season champion Conference regular season and conference tournament champion Division regular season champion Division regular season and conference tournament champion Conference tournament champion

== See also ==
- List of current NCAA Division I baseball coaches
- Columbia Lions
