= Robertson Field at Satow Stadium =

New York baseball venue

Hal Robertson Field at Phillip Satow Stadium
- Satow Stadium
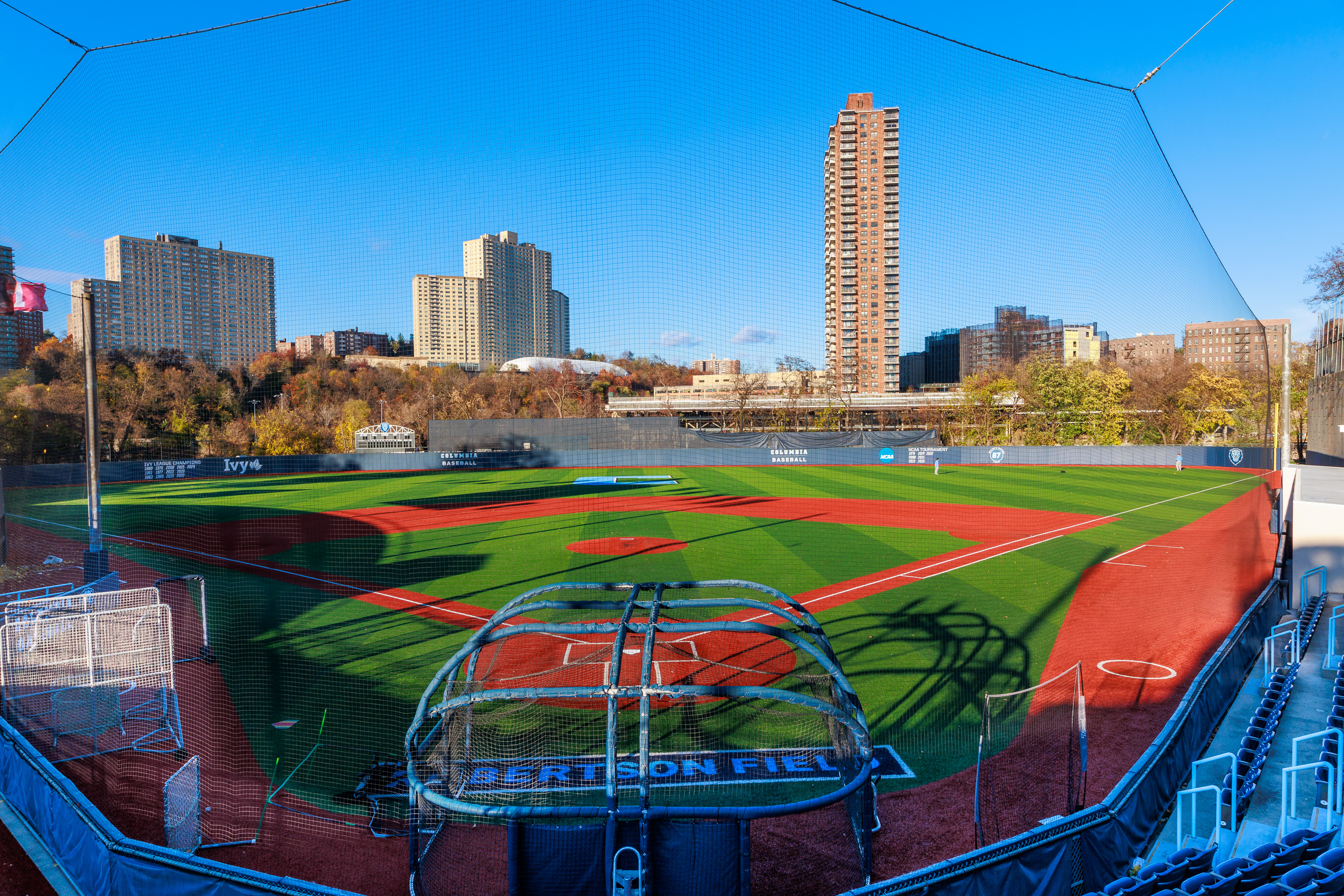
- Interactive map of Hal Robertson Field at Phillip Satow Stadium
- Location: 218th Street and Broadway, New York, New York, USA
- Coordinates: 40.873401°N 73.915254°W
- Owner: Columbia University
- Operator: Columbia University
- Capacity: 1,500
- Surface: FieldTurf
- Scoreboard: Electronic

Construction
- Opened: 1923

Tenants
- Columbia Lions baseball (NCAA DI Ivy); Ivy Championship Series (2010, 2013, 2014)

Hal Robertson Field at Phillip Satow Stadium is a baseball venue in New York, New York, United States. It is home to the Columbia Lions baseball team of the NCAA Division I Ivy League. The facility is named for two Columbia baseball alumni– Hal Robertson (class of 1981) and Phillip Satow (class of 1963). In 2007, a FieldTurf surface was installed, allowing for more use of the field during the offseason. In 2010, chairback seats were added, and the dugouts, press box, and scoreboard were renovated.

The field is located at the northern tip of the island of Manhattan, at 218th Street and Broadway. The close proximity of the Spuyten Duyvil Creek, which separates the island from the Bronx, means that the venue's center field fence is extremely shallow in comparison with its left and right field fences.

The venue hosted the Ivy League Baseball Championship Series in 2010, 2013, and 2014. Dartmouth won the 2010 series, while Columbia swept the opening doubleheader in front of 952 spectators to win the 2013 series. The Lions won again in 2014.

== See also ==
- List of NCAA Division I baseball venues
