= Murray Stadium =

Baseball venue in Providence, Rhode Island

Attanasio Family Field at Murray Stadium
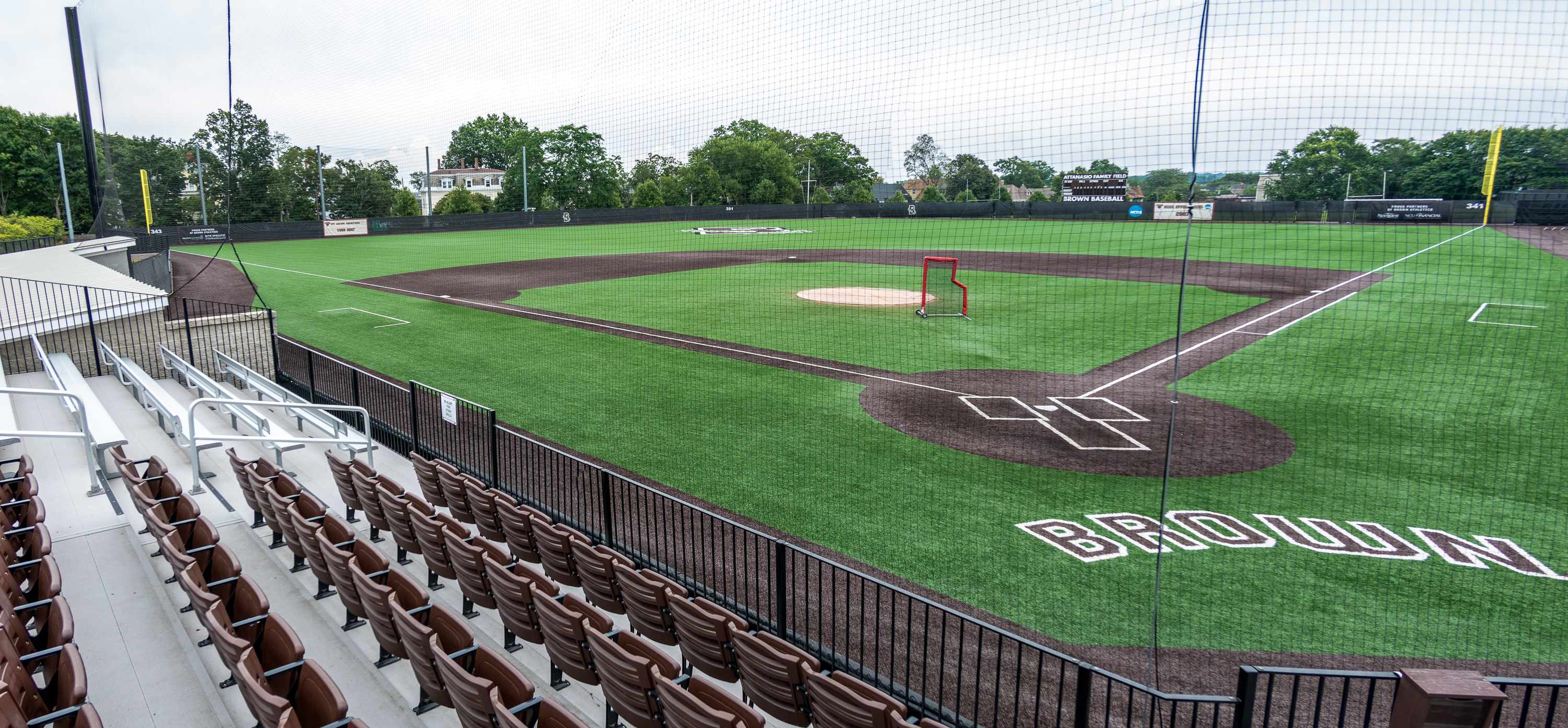
- Interactive map of Attanasio Family Field at Murray Stadium
- Former names: Aldrich Field (1959–2006); Murray Stadium (2007–2016)
- Location: Arlington Avenue and Humboldt Avenue, Providence, Rhode Island, US
- Coordinates: 41.83098°N 71.394433°W
- Owner: Brown University
- Operator: Brown University
- Capacity: 1,000
- Surface: Turf
- Scoreboard: Electronic

Construction
- Built: 1959
- Renovated: 2007, 2016

Tenant
- Brown Bears baseball (Ivy) (1959–present)

Murray Stadium is a baseball venue in Providence, Rhode Island, United States. It is home to the Brown Bears baseball team of the NCAA Division I Ivy League.

== Description and history ==
Opened in 1959, Brown's baseball stadium has a capacity of 1,000 spectators. Features include dugouts, bullpens, batting cages, and a press box. On May 5, 2007, the stadium hosted Brown's first ever Ivy League Baseball Championship, a 1–0, 20–6 doubleheader win over Penn. The game was played in front of over 1,500 spectators.

The stadium was dedicated on April 21, 2007, to the Murray family, boosters of Brown's baseball program who funded renovations to the stadium. The 2007 renovations included a new infield and landscaping around the stadium.

=== Attanasio Family Field ===
The stadium and field were completely renovated in November 2016 as "Attanasio Family Field at Murray Stadium" with a new scoreboard, sunken dugouts, and a turf field instead of grass. Milwaukee Brewers owner and 1979 graduate Mark Attanasio gave $2.25 million toward the new field.

== See also ==
- List of NCAA Division I baseball venues
