= Scott Bradley (baseball) =

American baseball player and coach (born 1960)

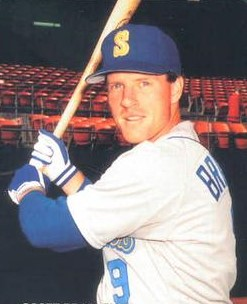
- Born: March 22, 1960 (age 66); Glen Ridge, New Jersey, U.S.
- Batted: Left Threw: Right

MLB debut
- September 9, 1984, for the New York Yankees

Last MLB appearance
- June 13, 1992, for the Cincinnati Reds

MLB statistics
- Batting average: .257
- Home runs: 18
- Runs batted in: 184
- Stats at Baseball Reference

Teams
- New York Yankees (1984–1985); Chicago White Sox (1986); Seattle Mariners (1986–1992); Cincinnati Reds (1992)

Scott William Bradley (born March 22, 1960) is an American former Major League Baseball catcher who played in the major leagues from 1984 to 1992. He played for the New York Yankees, Chicago White Sox, Seattle Mariners, and Cincinnati Reds. He was the head coach of the Princeton Tigers baseball team.

== Amateur career ==
Bradley was drafted by the Minnesota Twins in the 12th round of the 1978 MLB draft but did not sign with the team. He instead played college baseball for the University of North Carolina. In 1979 and 1980, he played collegiate summer baseball with the Chatham A's of the Cape Cod Baseball League. Bradley was a two-time All-American for the North Carolina Tar Heels and the Atlantic Coast Conference player of the year in 1980.

== Professional career ==
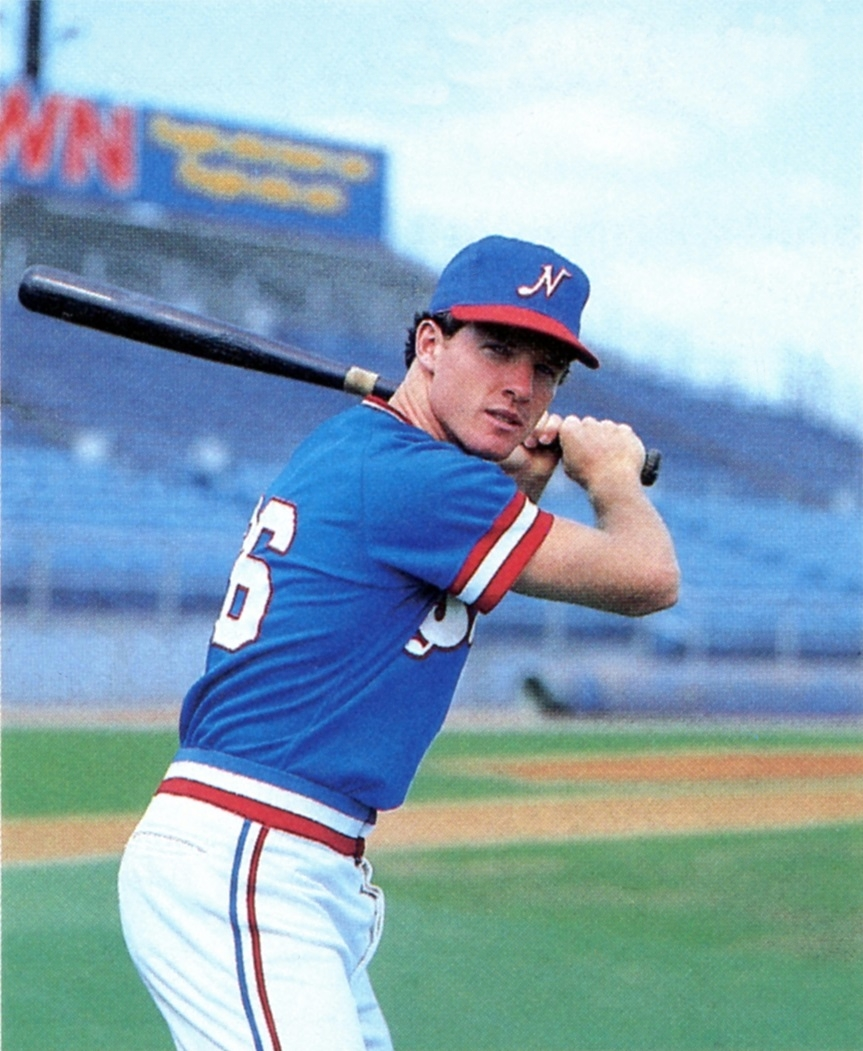
Bradley with the Nashville Sounds in 1983

=== Minor Leagues (1981–1984) ===
Bradley was selected by the New York Yankees in the third round of the 1981 MLB draft. After signing with the team, he debuted that summer with the Oneonta Yankees, where he hit .308 in 71 games. In 1982, he played mostly for the Fort Lauderdale Yankees, also appearing in five games for the Nashville Sounds, batting a combined .288 in 126 games. He returned to Nashville in 1983, and advanced to the Triple-A Columbus Clippers in 1984, where he hit .335 in 138 games.

=== New York Yankees (1984–1985) ===
Bradley was called up to the Yankees in September 1984. After two games as a defensive replacement, he got his first two MLB hits in his first start on September 13. He played in nine games for the Yankees in 1984, hitting .286 with 2 RBIs, mostly playing in left field. The following year, he started the season with the Yankees, but was sent down after going hitless in three games. He returned to the Yankees roster from mid-June until the end of July, primarily as a designated hitter, then struck out as a pinch hitter on September 15 in his last at bat as a Yankee. He hit .163 with 1 RBI in 19 games with New York, also playing 49 games in Double-A and Triple-A in 1985.

=== Chicago White Sox (1986) ===
On February 13, 1986, the Yankees traded Bradley, along with Neil Allen, Glenn Braxton, and cash to the Chicago White Sox for Ron Hassey, Matt Winters, Chris Alvarez, and Eric Schmidt.

Bradley played in nine games for the White Sox, hitting .286. He also played 33 games for the Triple-A Buffalo Bisons.

=== Seattle Mariners (1986–1992) ===
The White Sox traded Bradley to the Seattle Mariners on June 26, 1986 for a player to be named later. Five days later, the Mariners sent Ivan Calderon to the White Sox.

Bradley played most of his MLB games with Seattle, primarily playing catcher alongside Dave Valle. He finished the 1986 season strong, as his average increased to .302, having hit 5 home runs and 28 RBIs. He had his best season in 1987, when he hit .278 with 5 homers and 43 RBIs. The next season, 1988, Bradley hit .257 with four home runs and 33 RBIs. In 1989, he stayed very consistent, as he hit .274 with three home runs and 37 RBIs. However, he ceded playing time to Valle, who caught 23 more games than Bradley. In 1990, Bradley hit .223 with one home run and 28 RBIs, and was the catcher for Randy Johnson's no-hitter on June 2.

In 1991, Bradley hit .203 with 11 RBIs in 65 games. In 1992 he pinch hit in the first two Mariners games of the season, earning a walk and striking out, before being released on April 9.

=== Cincinnati Reds (1992) ===
Bradley signed with the Cincinnati Reds on April 28, 1992. He pinch hit for the Reds in five games, hitting 2-for-5 with one walk and one RBI. He also played in 24 games for Nashville, now a Triple-A team.

=== Minor leagues (1992–1994) ===
The Reds traded Bradley to the New York Mets on July 27, 1992 for a player to be named later. The Mets subsequently sent Joe McCann to Cincinnati to complete the trade. Bradley finished 1992 with the Triple-A Tidewater Tides. In 1993, Bradley played in 26 games for the Greenville Braves, Atlanta's Double-A affiliate. In 1994, he played in five games for the Colorado Rockies' Triple-A team, the Colorado Springs Sky Sox. He also was a coach in the Braves and Rockies minor league systems.

== Coaching career ==
After retiring, Bradley coached in the minor leagues for several seasons, beginning with the Rockies' Double-A New Haven Ravens in 1994. In 1997, he moved to college baseball, coaching for one season an assistant to Fred Hill at Rutgers. In May 1997, Bradley became the head coach of the Princeton Tigers. Bradley coached pitcher Ross Ohlendorf at Princeton, giving Bradley the unique distinction of catching Randy Johnson's no-hitter and later coaching a player Johnson would be traded for. Under Bradley, Princeton has appeared in seven NCAA tournaments, as of the end of the 2024 season.

Seven players Bradley coached have played in MLB. He also coached the general managers of both teams in the 2023 World Series, Chris Young of the Texas Rangers and Mike Hazen of the Arizona Diamondbacks.

=== College head coaching records ===
The following is a table of Bradley's yearly records as an NCAA Division I head baseball coach.

Record table
Season	Team	Overall	Conference	Standing	Postseason
Princeton Tigers (Ivy League) (1998–2026)
1998	Princeton	24–14	13–7	1st (Gehrig)	Ivy League Championship Series
1999	Princeton	25–20	15–5	1st (Gehrig)	Ivy League Championship Series
2000	Princeton	24–20	13–7	1st (Gehrig)	Houston Regional
2001	Princeton	23–15	14–6	1st (Gehrig)	Columbia Regional
2002	Princeton	21–23	13–7	1st (Gehrig)	Ivy League Championship Series
2003	Princeton	27–23	15–5	1st (Gehrig)	Auburn Regional
2004	Princeton	28–20	12–8	1st (Gehrig)	Charlottesville Regional
2005	Princeton	17–24	10–10	2nd (Gehrig)	
2006	Princeton	18–26–1	11–9	1st (Gehrig)	Fayetteville Regional
2007	Princeton	15–24	11–9	2nd (Gehrig)	
2008	Princeton	20–22	11–9	2nd (Gehrig)	
2009	Princeton	18–19	10–10	t-1st (Gehrig)	Gehrig Division Playoff
2010	Princeton	12–30	6–14	4th (Gehrig)	
2011	Princeton	23–24	15–5	1st (Gehrig)	Austin Regional
2012	Princeton	20–19	13–7	2nd (Gehrig)	
2013	Princeton	14–28	11–9	t-2nd (Gehrig)	
2014	Princeton	14–26	8–12	4th (Gehrig)	
2015	Princeton	7–32	4–16	4th (Gehrig)	
2016	Princeton	24–21	13–7	1st (Gehrig)	Lafayette Regional
2017	Princeton	12–28–1	7–13	4th (Gehrig)	
2018	Princeton	10–27	7–14	7th	
2019	Princeton	14–26	8–12	6th	
2020	Princeton	0–7	0–0		Season canceled due to COVID-19
2021	Princeton	0–0	0–0		Ivy League opted-out of the season
2022	Princeton	7–33	3–18	8th	
2023	Princeton	24–23	13–8	3rd	
2024	Princeton	18–26	13–10	2nd	Ivy League Tournament
2025	Princeton	12–31	8–13	6th	
2026	Princeton	15–27	8–13	T-6th	
Princeton:		486–658–2 (.425)	285–263 (.520)		
Total:		486–658–2 (.425)			
National champion Postseason invitational champion Conference regular season champion Conference regular season and conference tournament champion Division regular season champion Division regular season and conference tournament champion Conference tournament champion

== Personal life ==
Bradley's older brother is soccer coach Bob Bradley, and his nephew is former professional soccer player Michael Bradley. Both relatives represented the United States national soccer team.

Bradley's younger brother Jeff was a baseball writer for the Star-Ledger and founded Bradley Baseball Gloves.

Bradley and his wife Mary have three sons, Kevin, Kyle, and Scotty. Kevin was drafted by the Rockies out of high school in the 36th round of the 2012 MLB draft and later played college baseball for the Clemson Tigers, State College of Florida, and the Oklahoma State Cowboys. After college, Kevin signed with the Cleveland Indians, playing in 21 minor league games in 2016 and 2017 before retiring in July 2017.

Bradley's youngest son Scotty played first base for the Indiana Hoosiers and was drafted by the Toronto Blue Jays in the 36th round of the 2019 MLB draft. He played 36 games for the Bluefield Blue Jays in 2019 before retiring in 2021.

== See also ==
- List of current NCAA Division I baseball coaches
