= Red Rolfe Field at Biondi Park =

Baseball venue in Hanover, New Hampshire, US

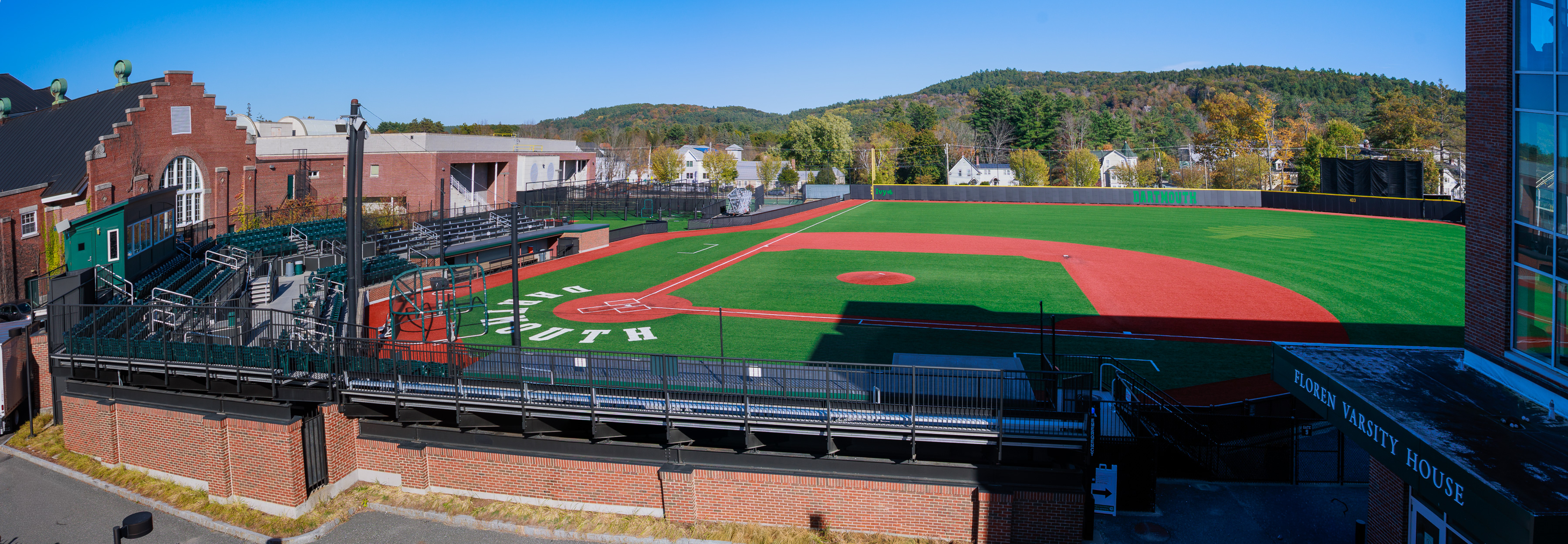
- Interactive map of Red Rolfe Field at Biondi Park
- Former names: Red Rolfe Field
- Location: Crosby Street, Hanover, NH, United States
- Coordinates: 43.702056°N 72.283296°W
- Owner: Dartmouth College
- Operator: Dartmouth College
- Capacity: 2,000
- Surface: FieldTurf
- Scoreboard: Electronic
- Field size: Left field: 324 feet (99 m); Center field: 403 feet (123 m); Right field: 342 feet (104 m)

Construction
- Renovated: 2008–9

Tenants
- Dartmouth Big Green baseball (NCAA DI Ivy); Ivy Championship Series (2001, 2004, 2008, 2009)

Red Rolfe Field at Biondi Park is a baseball venue in Hanover, New Hampshire, United States. It is home to the Dartmouth Big Green baseball team of the NCAA Division I Ivy League. The field has a capacity of 2,000 spectators. The field portion of the facility is named for Red Rolfe, Dartmouth Class of 1931, former New York Yankees player and Dartmouth athletic director from 1954 to 1967.

In 2008, a $5.2 million donation of two Dartmouth alumni, Michael J. (Class of 1979) and Cynthia Ginn (Class of 1980) Biondi, allowed for extensive renovations of the facility. The playing surface was changed from natural grass to FieldTurf and shifted slightly toward left field. The installation of turf allowed for increased use of the field during late fall and early spring. 650 permanent seats, with space for more than 1,000 additional seats, were added. Other new features included a new scoreboard, press box, dugouts, bullpens, and batting cages. Following the renovations, the park portion of the facility was dedicated Biondi Park in honor of the two donors.

In 2012, college baseball writer Eric Sorenson ranked the park as the third best small venue in Division I baseball.

== Events ==
The facility has hosted four Ivy League Championship Series (2001, 2004, 2008, and 2009). Dartmouth lost the first three series it hosted, but won the 2009 series, two games to one over Cornell, to advance to the 2009 NCAA tournament.

== See also ==
- List of NCAA Division I baseball venues
