= Bill Clarke Field =

Baseball venue in New Jersey

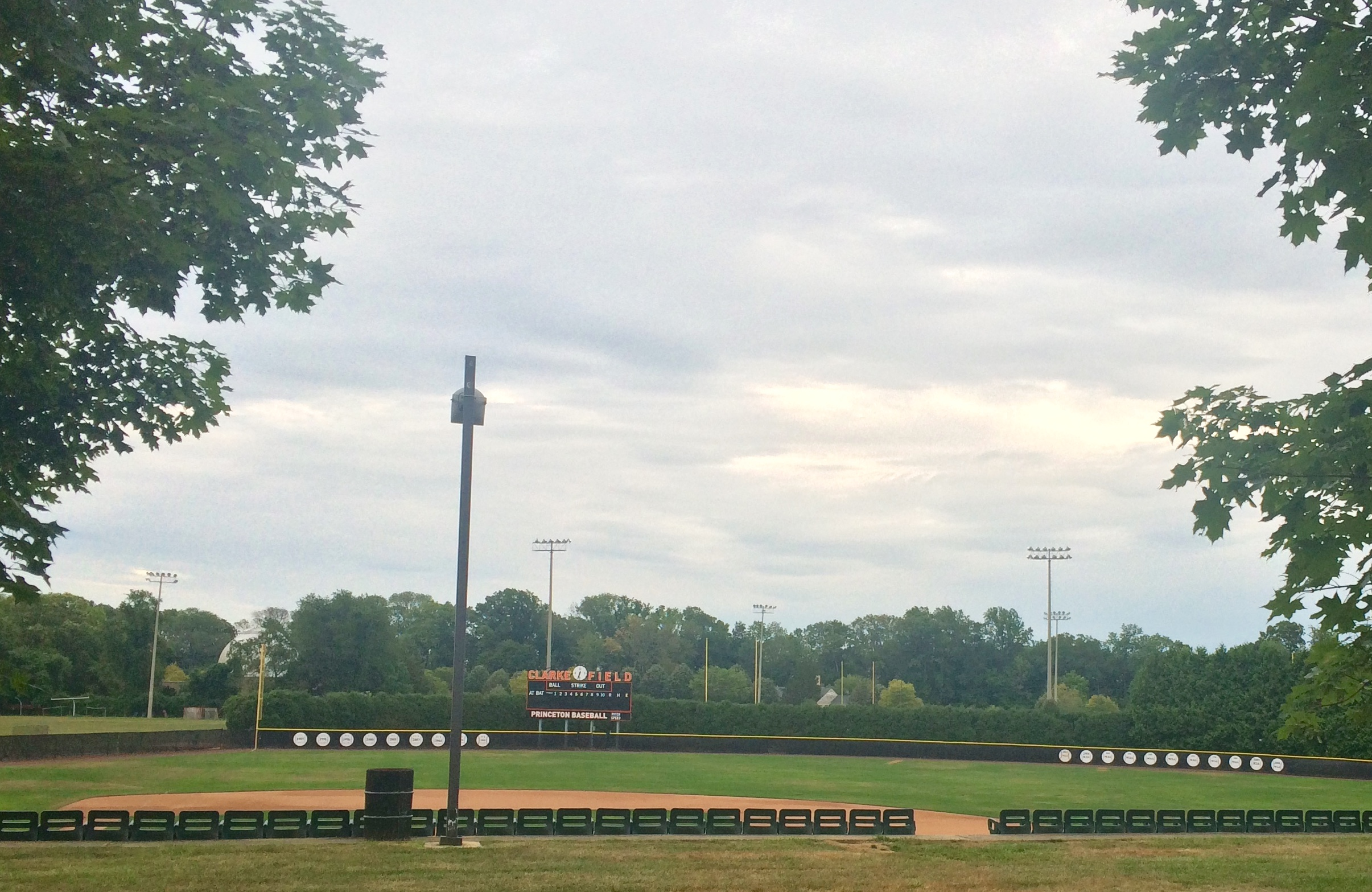
- Interactive map of Bill Clarke Field
- Location: Western Way west of Fitzrandolph Road, Princeton, New Jersey, USA
- Coordinates: 40.347051°N 74.648146°W
- Owner: Princeton University
- Operator: Princeton University
- Capacity: 850
- Surface: Natural grass
- Scoreboard: Electronic
- Field size: 325 ft. (LF); 375 ft. (LCF); 400 ft. (CF); 375 ft. (RCF); 315 ft. (RF)

Construction
- Opened: March 31, 1961
- Renovated: 2005, 2006

Tenant
- Princeton Tigers baseball (Ivy) (1961–present)

Bill Clarke Field is a baseball venue in Princeton, New Jersey, United States. It is home to the Princeton Tigers baseball team of the National Collegiate Athletic Association Division I Ivy League. Opened in 1961 and renovated in 2005, the venue is named for Bill “Boileryard” Clarke, former Princeton head baseball coach. The field is a sunken diamond, with the playing surface lying lower than the surrounding seating areas.

== History ==
The first game played at Bill Clarke Field was on March 31, 1962, in which Princeton lost 4–2 to University of Massachusetts at Amherst. As of the end of the 2006 season, Princeton had gone 422-277-6 (.603) at Clarke Field and finished with a losing record in only eight seasons.

In 2005, the facility underwent renovations. As part of the renovations, the infield was redone and the outfield fences were moved closer to home plate. In 2006, outdoor batting cages surfaces were added past the left field fence.

== Naming ==
The facility is named for former Princeton coach Bill Clarke. Clarke assisted the team from 1897 to 1901, while still playing in Major League Baseball. After retiring from professional baseball in 1905, Clarke returned to Princeton as the first paid head coach in 1909. He served two stints as the Tigers' head coach, one from 1909 to 1927 and the other from 1934 to 1944. Princeton was 564-322-10 (.642) under Clarke.

== Features ==
In addition to the features involved in 2005 and 2006 renovations, the field has an electronic scoreboard, public address system, and press box. The field's seating areas, raised around the sunken diamond, consist of permanent seats on the first-base side and bleachers on the third-base line.

== See also ==
- List of NCAA Division I baseball venues
