= Princeton Tigers baseball =

- 2026 Princeton Tigers baseball team
- Founded: 1864; 162 years ago
- University: Princeton University
- Head coach: Ryan Forrest (1st season)
- Conference: Ivy League
- Location: Princeton, New Jersey
- Home stadium: Bill Clarke Field (capacity: 850)
- Colors: Black and orange

College World Series appearances
- 1951

NCAA tournament appearances
- 1951, 1965, 1985, 1991, 1996, 2000, 2001, 2003, 2004, 2006, 2011, 2016

Conference tournament champions
- Ivy: 1996, 2000, 2001, 2003, 2004, 2006, 2011, 2016

Conference regular season champions
- EIBL: 1941, 1942, 1945, 1949, 1950, 1951, 1953, 1974, 1985, 1991

The Princeton Tigers baseball team is a varsity intercollegiate athletic team of Princeton University in Princeton, New Jersey, United States. The team is a member of the Ivy League, which is part of the National Collegiate Athletic Association's Division I. Princeton's first baseball team was fielded in 1864. The team plays its home games at Bill Clarke Field in Princeton, New Jersey. The Tigers are coached by Ryan Forrest.

The Tigers won 10 Eastern Intercollegiate Baseball League championships, and have claimed 8 Ivy League titles, advancing to the NCAA Division I Baseball Championship 12 times and the College World Series once, in 1951. Baseball was the first varsity sport at Princeton, and Bill Clarke was the first paid coach at the university. The Tigers also appeared in the first televised college baseball game in 1939 against Columbia.

== Princeton in the NCAA Tournament ==
| Year | Record | Pct | Notes |
|---|---|---|---|
| 1951 | 0–2 | .000 | College World Series 5th place |
| 1965 | 1–1 | .500 | Hosted District 2 |
| 1985 | 0–2 | .000 | Atlantic Regional |
| 1991 | 0–2 | .000 | Northeast Regional |
| 1996 | 0–2 | .000 | South I Regional |
| 2000 | 0–2 | .000 | Houston Regional |
| 2001 | 1–2 | .333 | Columbia Regional |
| 2003 | 0–2 | .000 | Auburn Regional |
| 2004 | 1–2 | .333 | Charlottesville Regional |
| 2006 | 0–2 | .000 | Fayetteville Regional |
| 2011 | 0–2 | .000 | Austin Regional |
| 2016 | 0–2 | .000 | Lafayette Regional |
| TOTALS | 3–23 | .115 | |

== Notable players ==
- Mike Chernoff – baseball general manager of the Cleveland Indians
- Mike Ford- Seattle Mariners First Baseman
- Joseph McElroy Mann - First collegiate player to throw a Curveball and first player to pitch a No-hitter, either amateur or professional
- William Stryker Gummere - First player to use the hook-slide in baseball
- William S. Schenck - First player to wear a chest protector in baseball

== See also ==
- List of NCAA Division I baseball programs
