= Penn Quakers baseball =

- 2026 Penn Quakers baseball team
- Founded: 1875
- University: University of Pennsylvania
- Head coach: John Yurkow (13th season)
- Conference: Ivy League
- Location: Philadelphia, Pennsylvania, U.S.
- Home stadium: Meiklejohn Stadium (Capacity: 850)
- Colors: Red and blue

NCAA tournament appearances
- 1975, 1988, 1989, 1990, 1995, 2023, 2024

Conference tournament champions
- Ivy: 1995, 2023, 2024

Conference regular season champions
- Ivy: 2022, 2023; EIBL: 1975, 1988, 1989, 1990

The Penn Quakers baseball team is a varsity intercollegiate athletic team of the University of Pennsylvania in Philadelphia, Pennsylvania. The team is a member of the Ivy League, which is part of the National Collegiate Athletic Association's Division I. The team plays its home games at Meiklejohn Stadium in Philadelphia, Pennsylvania. The Quakers are coached by John Yurkow.

== History ==
=== 19th century ===
The University of Pennsylvania's first baseball team was fielded in 1875.

=== 20th century ===
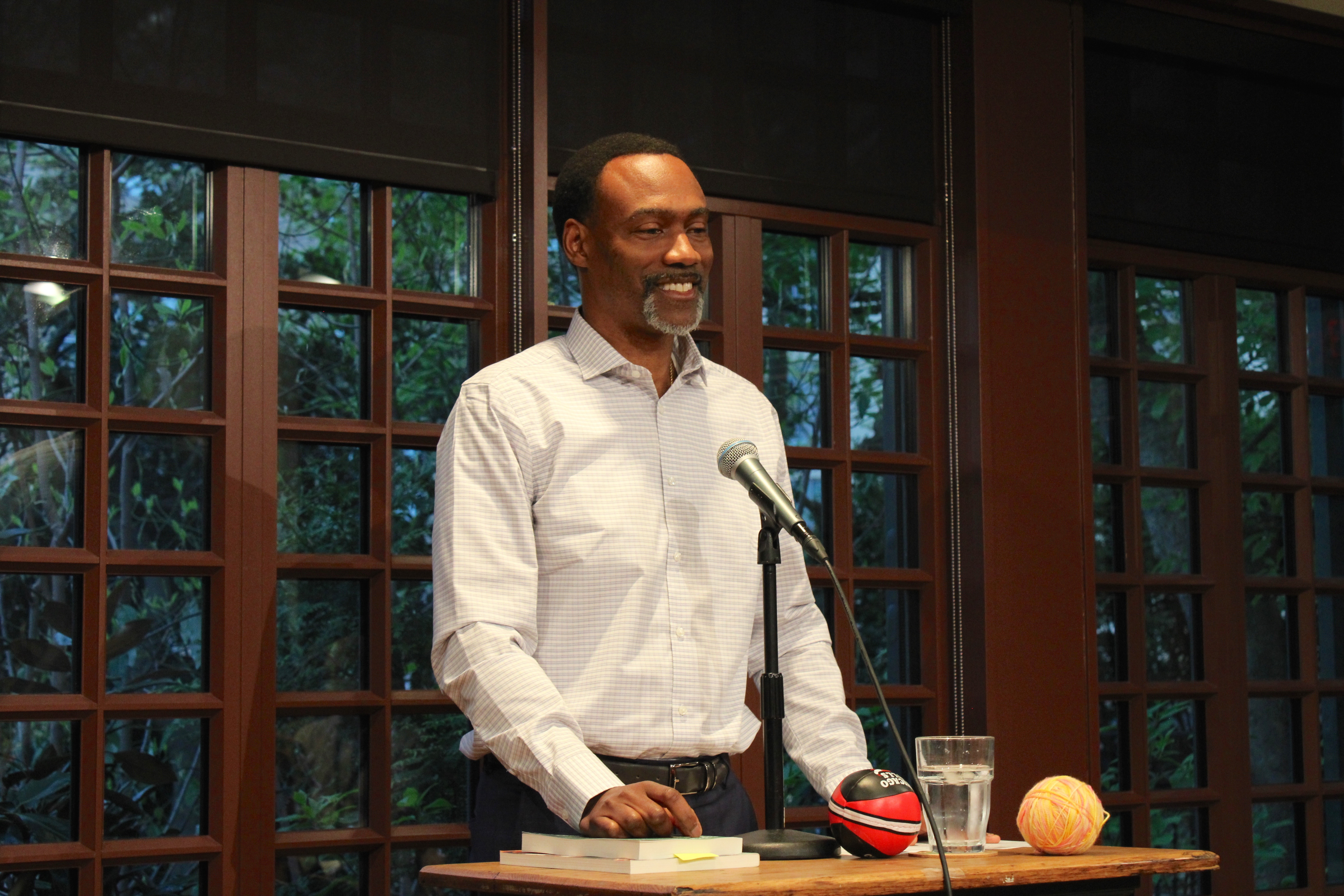
Doug Glanville, who majored in systems engineering at Penn, was a Major League Baseball outfielder with the Chicago Cubs, Philadelphia Phillies, and Texas Rangers from 1996 to 2004 and later a broadcast color analyst for Marquee Sports Network and ESPN and a contributor to The Athletic.

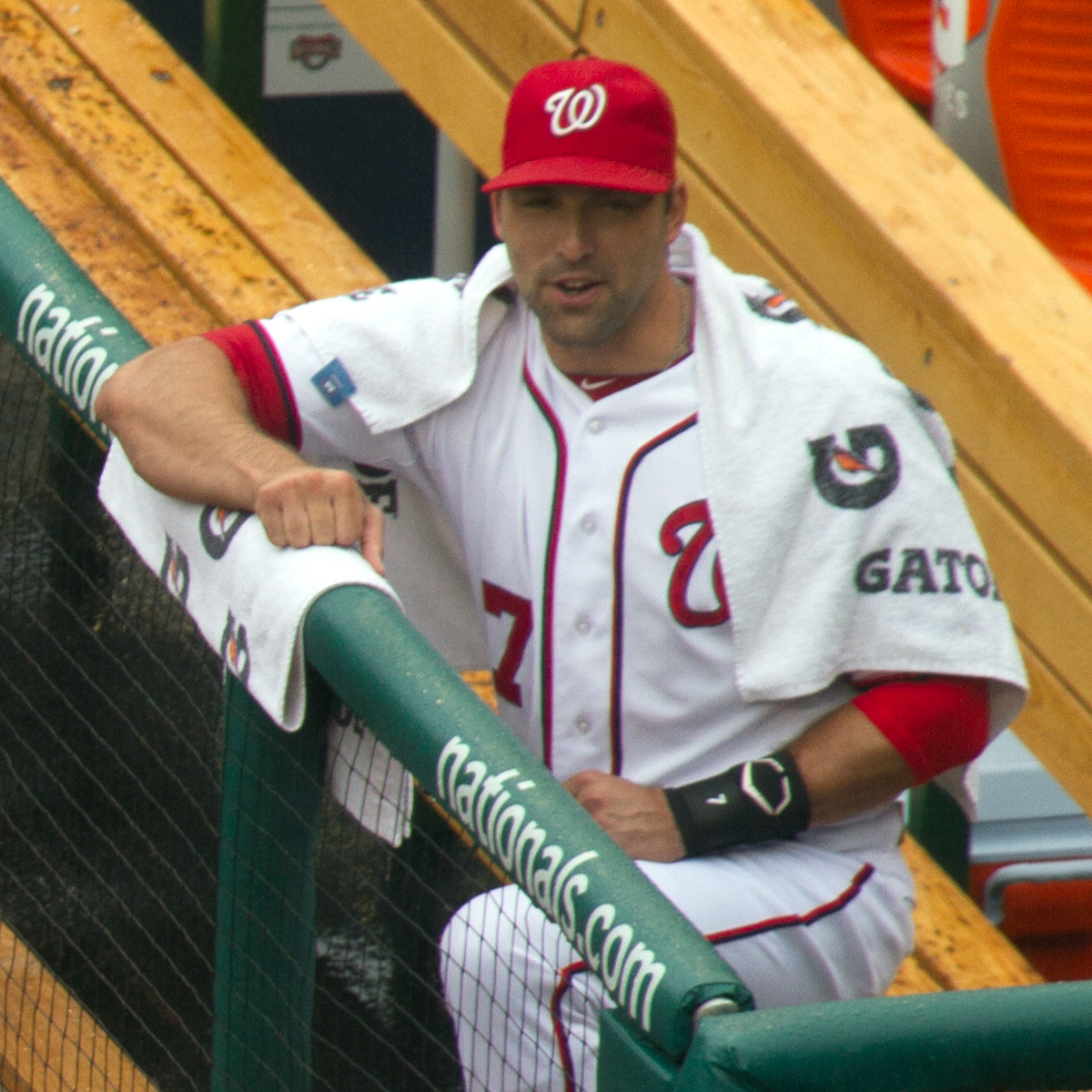
Mark DeRosa, a former Major League Baseball player who primarily played third and second base from 1998 to 2013, with the Washington Nationals in 2012

The Quakers won four championships in the Eastern Intercollegiate Baseball League, a baseball-only conference that existed from 1930 to 1992, which consisted of the eight Ivy League schools and Army and Navy. Penn baseball has won two Ivy League title and has advanced to the NCAA Division I Baseball Championship six times.

=== 21st century ===
In 2023, the fourth-seeded Penn team twice defeated third-seeded Cornell to win the program's second consecutive Ivy League Tournament title and earn a berth into the NCAA regional.

== Postseason ==
The Quakers have made the NCAA Division I baseball tournament six times.

Year	Region	Opponent	Result
1975	Northeast	Seton Hall; Maine	L 5–7; L 0–1
1988	Central	California; Southern; Michigan	L 3–13; W 10–6; L 6–7
1989	Northeast	Illinois; Arizona State; Le Moyne	W 7–1; L 4–15; L 16–18
1990	West II	Arizona State; UC Santa Barbara; Washington State	L 1–12; W 5–3; L 2–8
1995	Midwest II	Auburn; Indiana State	L 1–2; L 5–6
2023	Auburn Regional	Auburn; Samford; Southern Miss	W 6–3; W 5–4; L 2–11
2024	Charlottesville Regional	Virginia; St. John's	L 2–4; L 9–10 (12 innings)

== Gallery ==
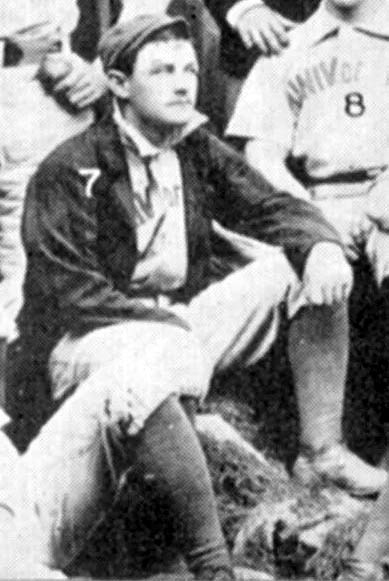
Thomas H. Cahill c. 1890

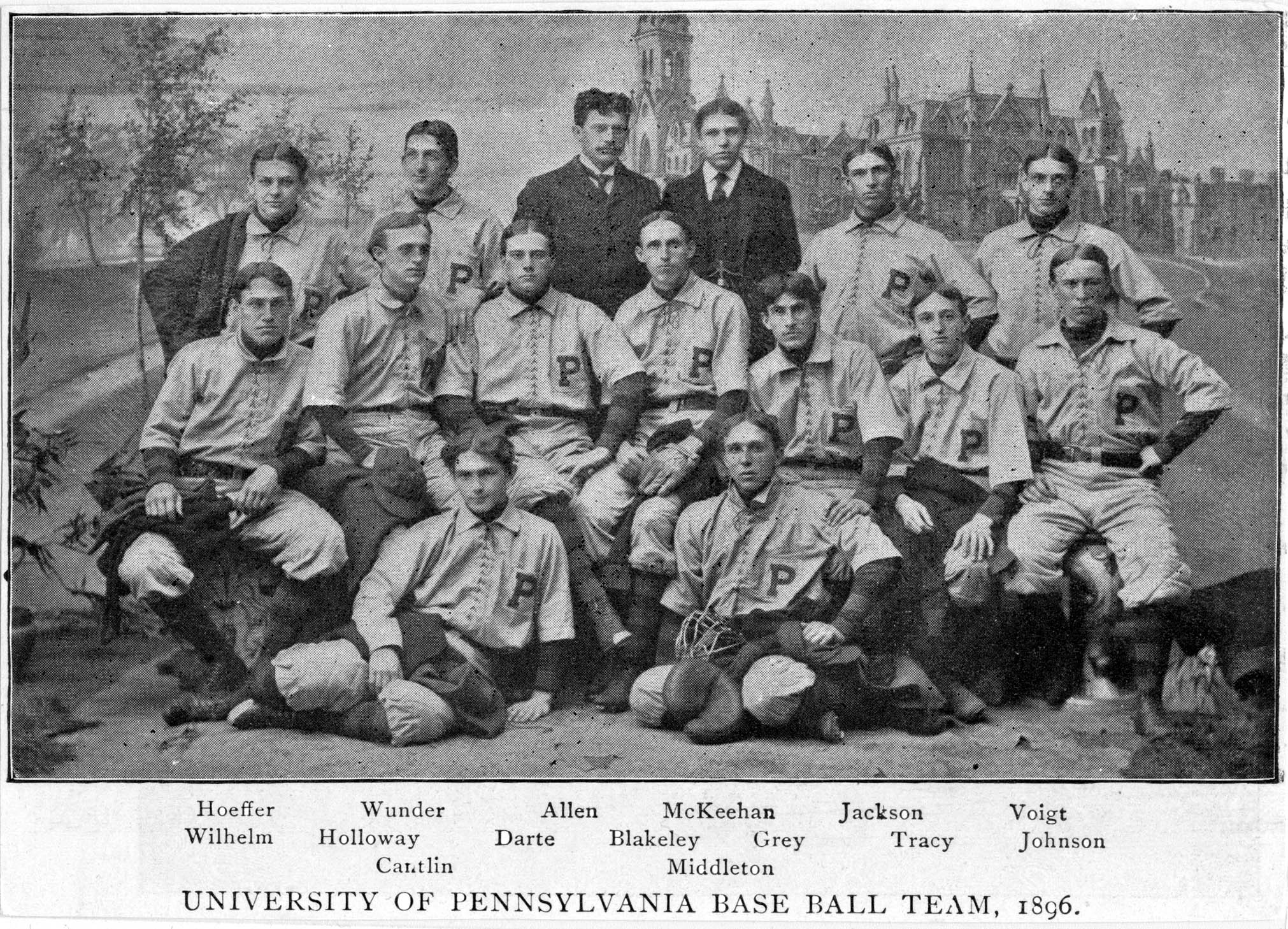
The Penn baseball team in 1896

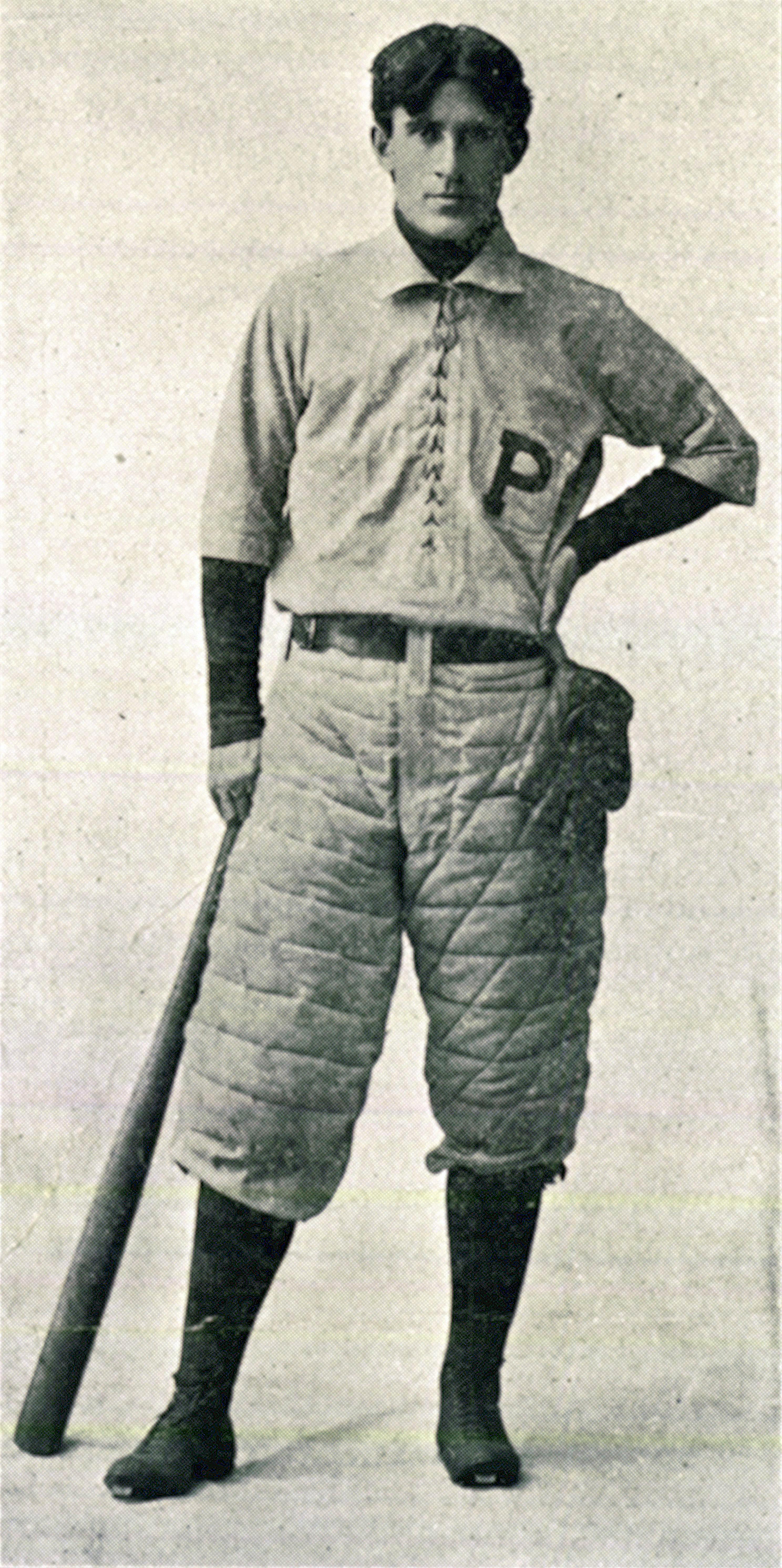
Zane Grey, graduated from Penn in 1896

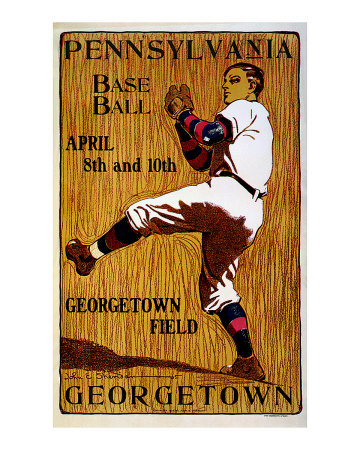
The Penn vs. Georgetown baseball program, c. 1901

== See also ==
- List of NCAA Division I baseball programs
