= Columbia Lions baseball =

Varsity athletic team for Columbia University in New York City

Columbia Lions
- 2026 Columbia Lions baseball team
- Founded: 1868
- University: Columbia University
- Head coach: Brett Boretti (21st season)
- Conference: Ivy League
- Location: New York City
- Home stadium: Robertson Field at Satow Stadium
- Nickname: Lions
- Colors: Columbia blue and white

NCAA tournament appearances
- 1976, 2008, 2013, 2014, 2015, 2018, 2022, 2025

Conference tournament champions
- 2008, 2013, 2014, 2015, 2018, 2022, 2025

Conference regular season champions
- EIBL: 1933, 1934, 1944, 1963, 1976, 1977; Ivy: 1960*, 1961*, 1986*, 2008, 2013, 2014, 2015, 2018, 2022, 2024, 2025 * Named Ivy League champion as highest-finishing Ivy League school in EIBL

The Columbia Lions baseball team is a varsity intercollegiate athletic team of Columbia University in New York City. The team is a member of the Ivy League, which is part of the National Collegiate Athletic Association's Division I. Columbia's first baseball team was fielded in 1868. The team plays its home games at Robertson Field at Satow Stadium in New York City. The Lions are coached by Brett Boretti.

== History ==
=== Lou Gehrig ===
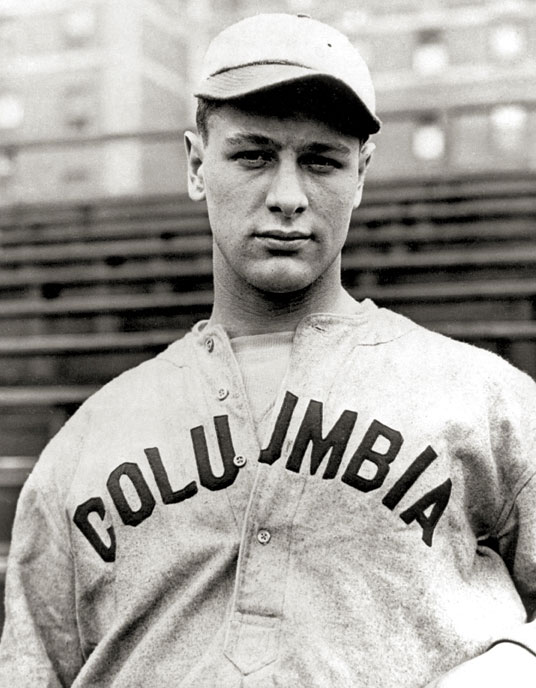
Columbia player Lou Gehrig in 1921

The most famous member of the Columbia baseball team was Lou Gehrig. Gehrig attended Columbia between 1921 and 1923, intending to become an engineer. Known as "Columbia Lou," Gehrig played both baseball and football. Gehrig drew attention for his record-breaking 400-foot home runs and, as a pitcher, his 17-game strikeout streak in 1923. Gehrig signed with the Yankees in his sophomore year, leaving college for a lucrative paycheck, but remained a fan of Columbia sports for the remainder of his life.

Before Gehrig, Hall of Famer Eddie Collins also played for Columbia.

== Columbia in the NCAA tournament ==
Year	Record	Pct	Notes
1976	0–2	.000	Northeast Regional
2008	0–2	.000	Conway Regional
2013	1–2	.333	Fullerton Regional
2014	0–2	.000	Coral Gables Regional
2015	3–2	.600	Coral Gables Regional
2018	0–2	.000	Gainesville Regional
2022	2–2	.500	Blacksburg Regional
2025	1–2	.333	Hattiesburg Regional
TOTALS	7–16	.304	

== Major League Baseball ==
Columbia has had 27 Major League Baseball draft selections since the draft began in 1965.

Lions in the Major League Baseball Draft
Year	Player	Round	Team
1965	Archie Roberts	50	Cardinals
1966	Robert Bosson	19	Indians
1966	Steven Richman	52	Yankees
1967	Robert Bosson	2	Dodgers
1967	Steven Richman	4	Twins
1972	James Romanosky	25	Cardinals
1984	Gene Larkin	20	Twins
1986	Pete Murphy	23	Pirates
1988	Frank Seminara	12	Yankees
1991	Kenneth Cavazzoni	15	Reds
1991	Chris Kotes	23	Blue Jays
1994	Garrett Neubart	47	Expos
1995	Garrett Neubart	17	Rockies
1996	Jason Halper	54	Yankees
1997	Jason Halper	45	Yankees
1999	Hawkeye Wayne	11	Mariners
2004	Fernando Perez	7	Devil Rays
2004	Jessen Grant	43	Cardinals
2012	Dario Pizzano	15	Mariners
2012	Pat Lowery	21	Angels
2013	Alex Black	29	Royals
2014	David Speer	27	Indians
2015	Gus Craig	30	Mariners
2015	George Thanopoulous	35	Mets
2015	Jordan Serena	35	Angels
2016	Will Savage	16	Tigers
2016	George Thanopoulous	27	Rockies

== See also ==
- List of NCAA Division I baseball programs
