= Dartmouth Big Green baseball =

- 2026 Dartmouth Big Green baseball team
- Founded: 1866
- University: Dartmouth College
- Head coach: Blake McFadden
- Conference: Ivy League
- Location: Hanover, New Hampshire
- Home stadium: Red Rolfe Field at Biondi Park (capacity: 2,000)
- Nickname: Big Green
- Colors: Dartmouth green and white

College World Series appearances
- 1970

NCAA tournament appearances
- 1958, 1967, 1969, 1970, 1987, 2009, 2010

Conference regular season champions
- EIBL/Ivy League: 1930, 1935, 1936, 1938, 1948, 1963, 1967, 1969, 1970, 1987, 2009, 2010

The Dartmouth Big Green baseball team is the varsity intercollegiate baseball program of Dartmouth College, located in Hanover, New Hampshire. It has been a member of the NCAA Division I Ivy League baseball conference since its founding at the start of the 1993 season. Before that it was a member of the Eastern Intercollegiate Baseball League (EIBL). Its home venue is Red Rolfe Field at Biondi Park, located on the university's campus. Blake McFadden was named the team's interim head coach for the 2026 season following the retirement of longtime head coach Bob Whalen. The program has appeared in seven NCAA Tournaments and one College World Series. In conference postseason play, it has been EIBL Champion twelve times and has appeared in the Ivy League Baseball Championship Series 11 times, winning twice. 30 former Big Green have appeared in Major League Baseball.

== Dartmouth in the NCAA Tournament ==
Year	Record	Pct	Notes
1958	0–2	.000	District 1
1967	1–2	.333	District 1
1969	0–2	.000	District 1
1970	4–2	.667	College World Series 5th place, District 1 Champs
1987	1–2	.333	Northeast Regional
2009	0–2	.000	Chapel Hill Regional
2010	1–2	.333	Coral Gables Regional
TOTALS	7–14	.333	

== Coaches ==
=== Head coaches ===
Tenure(s)	Coach	Seasons	W-L-T	Pct
1866–1900	None	29	196–201–3	.494
1901	John P. Fifield	1	10–6	.625
1902	Edwin Breckenridge	1	9–12	.429
1903	Fred Brown	1	14–11	.560
1904–1905	W. Hamilton	2	30–16	.652
1906–1907	Tom McCarthy	2	30–17–1	.635
1908–1911	John Keady	4	53–42–2	.558
1912–1915	Walter Woods	4	54–45–1	.545
1916	W. C. Hazelton	1	12–9	.579
1918	Archibald J. Ranney	1	8–8	.500
1919–1946	Jeff Tesreau	28	384–270–5	.586
1947–1951	Edward Jeremiah	5	41–75–2	.356
1952–1956	Robert Shawkey	5	44–71–1	.384
1957–1977	Ulysses "Tony" Lupien	21	313–305–3	.506
1978–1980	Fred Kelley	3	19–84–1	.188
1981	George Landis	1	7–24	.226
1982–1989	Mike Walsh	8	137–148–1	.481
1990–present	Bob Whalen	35	642–674–3	.488
TOTALS	18	152	2,003–2,018–23	.498

== Notable alumni ==
- Brad Ausmus – catcher in Major League Baseball; attended, but did not play baseball for Dartmouth
- Jim Beattie - pitcher for New York Yankees and Seattle Mariners
- Kyle Hendricks – pitcher in Major League Baseball for Los Angeles Angels
- Ed Lucas – third baseman in Major League Baseball
- Mike Remlinger – pitcher in Major League Baseball
- Red Rolfe - major league third baseman and four-time All Star for New York Yankees
- Chuck Seelbach - MLB Pitcher for Detroit Tigers
- Cole Sulser - MLB Pitcher for Baltimore Orioles
- Ben Rice - major league catcher for New York Yankees
