= Yale Bulldogs baseball =

- 2026 Yale Bulldogs baseball team
- Founded: 1865; 161 years ago
- University: Yale University
- Head coach: Brian Hamm (4th season)
- Conference: Ivy League
- Location: New Haven, Connecticut
- Home stadium: George H. W. Bush Field (capacity: 6,200)
- Nickname: Bulldogs, Eli’s
- Colors: Yale blue and white

College World Series runner-up
- 1947, 1948

College World Series appearances
- 1947, 1948

NCAA tournament appearances
- 1947, 1948, 1981, 1992, 1993, 2017, 2026

Conference tournament champions
- 2026

Conference regular season champions
- EIBL: 1932, 1937, 1946, 1947, 1956, 1957, 1981, 1992; Ivy: 1993, 1994, 2017, 2025, 2026

The Yale Bulldogs baseball team is a varsity intercollegiate athletic team of Yale University in New Haven, Connecticut, United States. The team is a member of the Ivy League, which is part of the National Collegiate Athletic Association's Division I. Yale's first baseball team was fielded in 1864. The team plays its home games at Bush Field in New Haven, Connecticut. The Bulldogs are coached by Brian Hamm.

== History ==
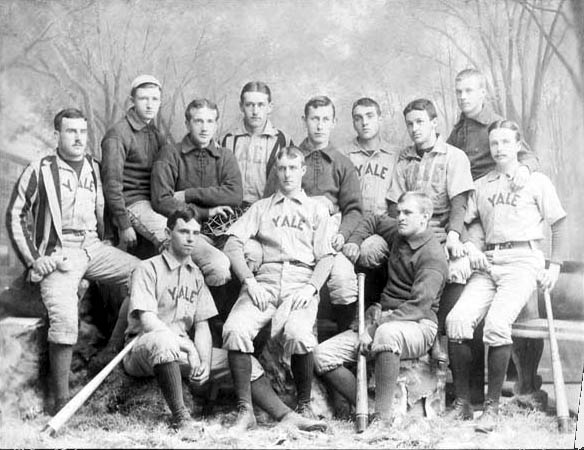
Yale team c. 1887–91

Yale played its first baseball game on September 30, 1865 against Wesleyan College; Yale won 30 to 12. On July 23, 1868, Yale played its first championship game as an invitational against Harvard University, in which it lost 25–17. On June 5, 1869, Harvard visited Brooklyn and defeated Yale 41–24. Harvard would continue to dominate Yale in the Ivy League baseball conference, but Yale won two games in 1874.

In 1928, Yale Field was built to house the Yale baseball program. Yale's first game in their new stadium was played in 1928 against the Eastern League New Haven Professionals. The first pitch was thrown by Mayor Tower of New Haven. The result of the game was a 12–0 shutout by the road team.

Major leaguers pitcher Craig Breslow (Oakland A's and Boston Red Sox) and catcher Ryan Lavarnway (Boston Red Sox/Los Angeles Dodgers), among others, played baseball for the Bulldogs. Breslow led the Ivy League with a 2.56 ERA in 2002. Lavarnway led the NCAA in batting average (.467) and slugging percentage (.873) in 2007, set the Ivy League hitting-streak record (25), and through 2010 held the Ivy League record in career home runs (33). In August 2012, Breslow and Lavarnway, playing for the Red Sox, became the first Yale grads to be Major League teammates since 1949, and the first All-Yale battery in the major leagues since 1883. In September 2016 the two were again battery-mates, this time playing for Team Israel in the qualifiers for the 2017 World Baseball Classic.

== Yale in the NCAA Tournament ==
Year	Record	Pct	Notes
1947	2–2	.500	College World Series Runner-up, Eastern Playoff Champion
1948	4–2	.667	College World Series Runner-up, Eastern Playoff Champion
1981	0–2	.000	Northeast Regional
1992	1–2	.333	Mideast Regional
1993	0–2	.000	Central I Regional
2017	2–2	.500	Corvallis Regional
2026	0-2	.000	Eugene Regional
TOTALS	9–14	.391	

== Major League Baseball ==
Bob Davis pitched for Yale and then pitched in Major League Baseball in 1958 and 1960. Yale has had 35 Major League Baseball draft selections since the draft began in 1965.

Bulldogs in the Major League Baseball Draft
Year	Player	Round	Team
1968	Edward Goldstone	8	Phillies
1970	Steve Greenberg	17	Senators
1973	Robert Corcoran	29	Cardinals
1973	Dick Jauron	25	Cardinals
1981	Ron Darling	1	Rangers
1992	David Verduzco	35	Tigers
1993	Scott Eidle	53	Astros
1993	Manny Patel	30	Mariners
1993	Blair Hodson	19	Indians
1994	Keith Pelatowski	28	Cubs
1994	Dan Lock	2	Astros
1995	Dave Feuerstein	33	Rockies
1996	Dan Thompson	22	Brewers
1998	Tommy Kidwell	33	Cardinals
1998	Eric Gutshall	30	Cardinals
1999	Ben Johnstone	26	Cubs
1999	Todd Kasper	15	Diamondbacks
2000	Tony Coyne	23	Mets
2001	Jon Steitz	3	Brewers
2002	Craig Breslow	26	Brewers
2002	Matt McCarthy	21	Angels
2005	Josh Sowers	10	Blue Jays
2006	Jon Hollis	38	Rangers
2007	Marc Sawyer	15	Cubs
2008	Steven Gilman	36	Tigers
2008	Brian Irving	17	Giants
2008	Ryan Lavarnway	6	Red Sox
2009	Brandon Josselyn	25	Mariners
2010	Trygg Danforth	49	Red Sox
2011	Gant Elmore	49	Brewers
2011	Brook Hart	23	Rockies
2012	Charlie Neil	37	Tigers
2012	Nolan Becker	11	Reds
2012	Pat Ludwig	10	Pirates
2013	Rob Cerfolio	34	Dodgers

=== Undrafted players ===
- Craig Breslow, MLB pitcher

== Other notable players ==
=== National teams ===
- Eric Brodkowitz, Israeli-American baseball pitcher for the Israel national baseball team
- Ben Wanger, Israeli-American baseball pitcher for the Israel national baseball team

=== Notable in other fields ===
- George H. W. Bush, 43rd Vice President of the United States, 41st President of the United States, first baseman 1947–1948
- Ron DeSantis, 46th Governor of Florida, outfielder, led team in batting average in 2001, listed on roster as R. D. DeSantis while playing

== See also ==
- List of NCAA Division I baseball programs
