= Brown Bears baseball =

- 2026 Brown Bears baseball team
- Founded: 1863; 163 years ago
- University: Brown University
- Head coach: Frank Holbrook (1st season)
- Conference: Ivy League
- Location: Providence, Rhode Island
- Home stadium: Murray Stadium (capacity: 1,000)
- Nickname: Bears
- Colors: Seal brown, cardinal red, and white

NCAA tournament appearances
- 2007

Conference tournament champions
- 2007

Conference regular season champions
- 1952

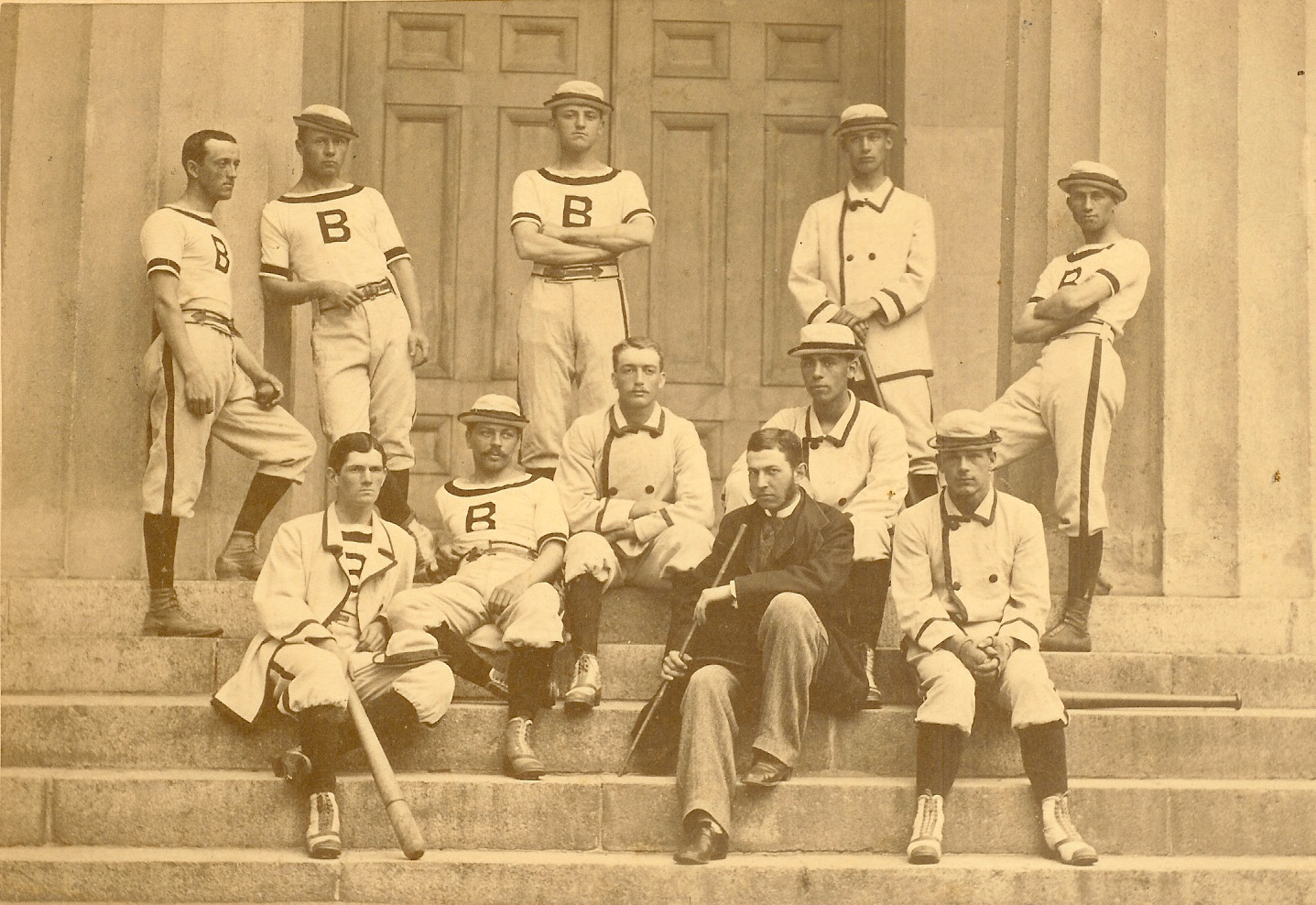
Brown team of 1879

The Brown Bears baseball team is the varsity intercollegiate athletic team of the Brown University in Providence, Rhode Island, United States. The team competes in the National Collegiate Athletic Association's Division I and are members of the Ivy League. Previously, they had played in the Eastern Intercollegiate Baseball League, which consisted of schools in the Ivy League along with Army and Navy before the Ivy League began to sponsor baseball entirely in 1992.

In November 2022, freshman Olivia Pichardo became the first woman named to an NCAA Division I baseball roster, due to making the team as a walk-on. In March 2023, she had a plate appearance as a pinch-hitter, making her the first woman to play in any NCAA Division I baseball game. In April 2026, Pichardo became the first woman to pitch in an NCAA Division I baseball game, pitching for Brown in a victory over Cornell University.

== NCAA Tournament ==
Brown has participated in the NCAA Division I baseball tournament once, in 2007.

Year	Region	Round	Opponent	Result
2007	Wichita Super Regional	First Round; Lower Round 1	Texas; Wake Forest	L 2–8; L 2–4
