= Cornell Big Red baseball =

- 2026 Cornell Big Red baseball team
- Founded: 1869; 157 years ago
- University: Cornell University
- Head coach: Dan Pepicelli (11th season)
- Conference: Ivy League
- Location: Ithaca, New York
- Home stadium: Booth Field (Capacity: 500)
- Nickname: Big Red
- Colors: Carnelian red and white

NCAA tournament appearances
- 1977, 2012

Conference tournament champions
- 2012

Conference regular season champions
- EIBL: 1939, 1940, 1952*, 1972, 1977, 1980; Ivy: 1959**, 1979**, 1982**, 2012 * Winner of South Division, no overall conference champion named ** Named Ivy League champion as highest-finishing Ivy League school in EIBL

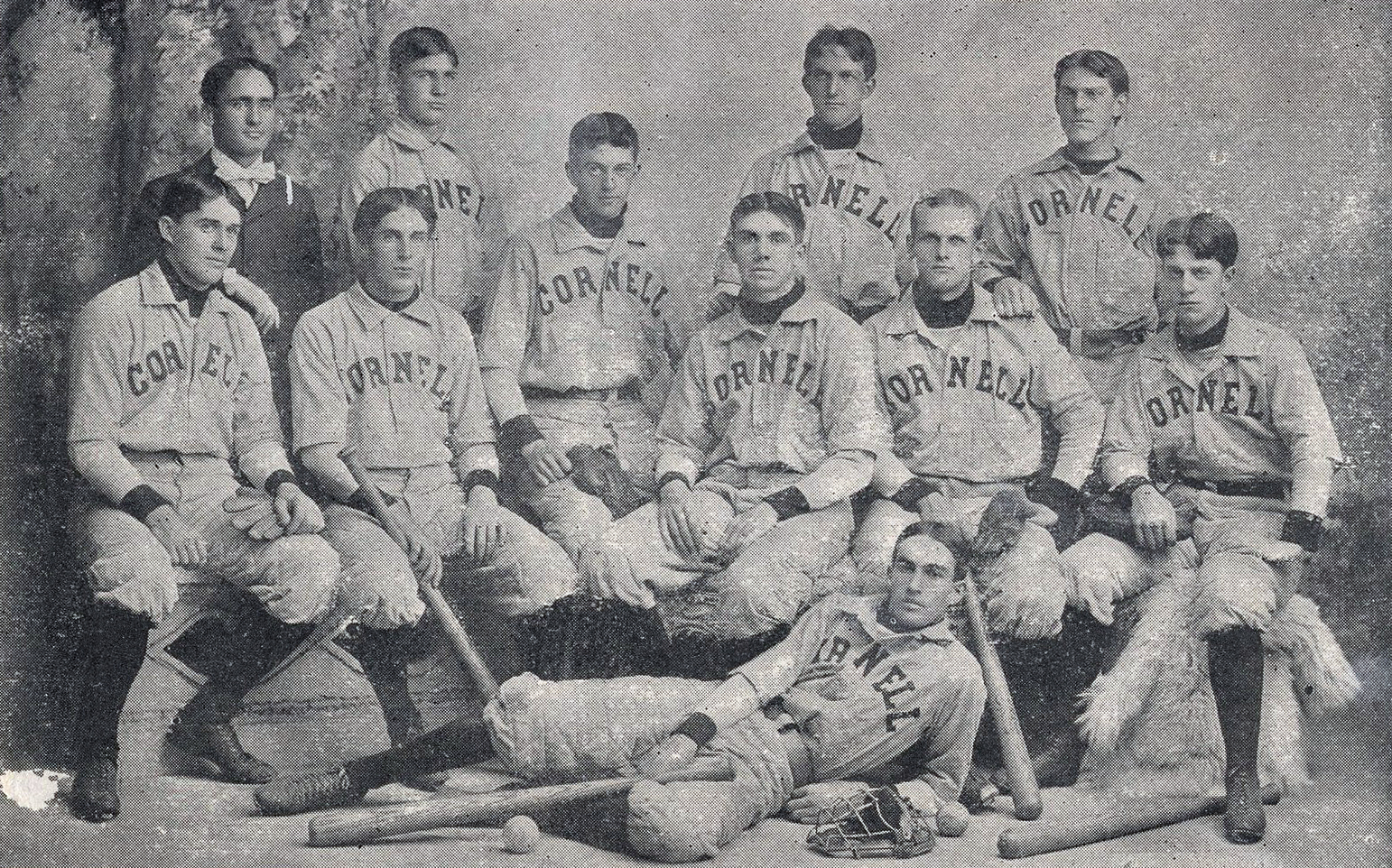
1896 team

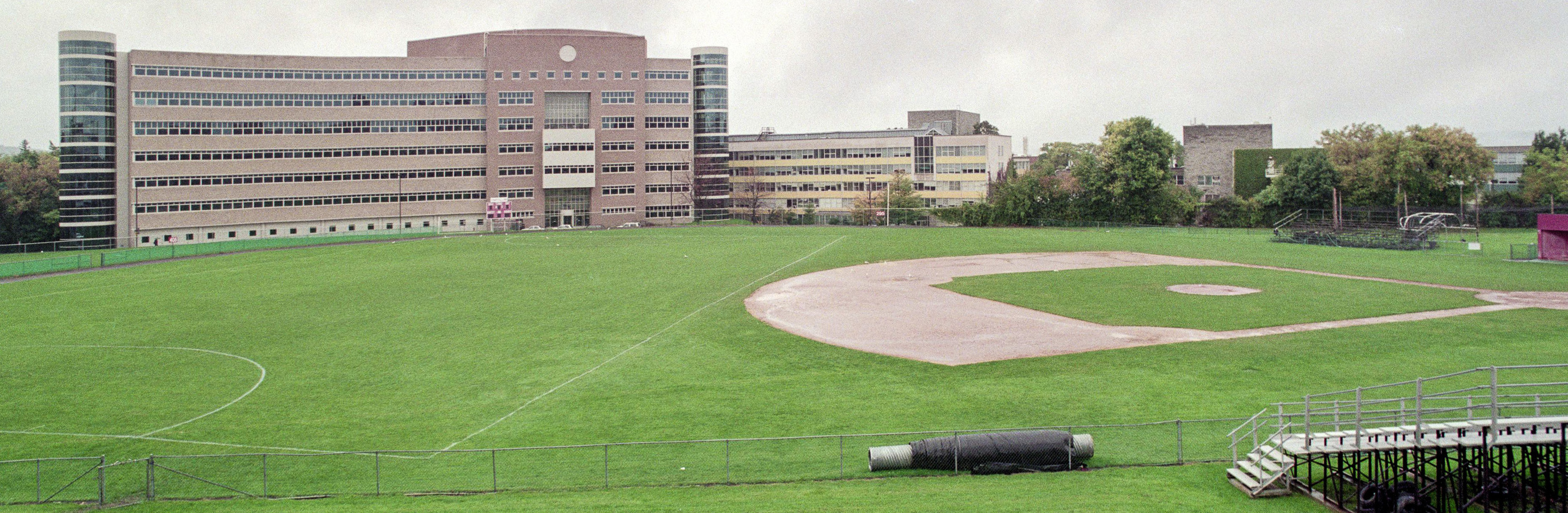
Hoy Field

The Cornell Big Red baseball team is a varsity intercollegiate athletic team of Cornell University in Ithaca, New York, United States. The team is a member of the Ivy League, which is part of NCAA Division I. Cornell's first baseball team was fielded in 1869 and participated in the Eastern Intercollegiate Baseball League (EIBL) until 1992. Since 2023, the team plays its home games at Booth Field in Ithaca, New York, following 101 years at Hoy Field.

== History ==
=== Davy Hoy ===
David "Davy" F. Hoy, an alumnus and longtime university registrar, served as the university's baseball advisor for thirty years at the start of the 20th century. He traveled south with the team for spring training each year. Hoy baseball field was built at his urging in 1922, and named for him in 1923. Hoy threw out the first pitch on the field; the ball he used is preserved in the Kroch Library collections. Hoy was injured in a 1929 bus accident in Virginia while riding with the baseball team, and he died in December 1930 at age 67. Cornell's fight song, Give My Regards to Davy references "Davy" Hoy prominently.

== Cornell in the NCAA Tournament ==
Year	Record	Pct	Notes
1977	2–2	.500	Northeast Regional
2012	0–2	.000	Chapel Hill Regional
TOTALS	2–4	.333	

== Major League Baseball ==
Cornell has had 14 Major League Baseball draft selections since the draft began in 1965.

Big Red in the Major League Baseball Draft
Year	Player	Round	Team
1967	Edward Cott	9	Reds
1968	Edward Cott	5	Senators
1969	Timothy McEnderfer	34	Cardinals
1972	Michael McGuire	1	Tigers
1972	Michael McGuire	10	Pirates
1974	Steve Hamrick	15	Cubs
1977	Kenneth Veenema	11	Cubs
1999	Brian Williamson	32	Mets
2002	Erik Rico	22	Blue Jays
2003	Chris Schutt	7	Twins
2004	Daniel Baysinger	31	Cardinals
2006	Everett Collis	28	Mariners
2011	Jadd Schmeltzer	49	Red Sox
2014	Brent Jones	4	Diamondbacks

== See also ==
- List of NCAA Division I baseball programs
