= Cornelliana =

Anything related to Cornell University

Cornelliana is anything related to Cornell University, an Ivy League university founded in 1865 in Ithaca, New York State. The university has a considerable number of traditions, legends, and lore unique to the university that have developed over its existence, which spans over 150 years.

== Traditions ==
=== Dragon Day ===
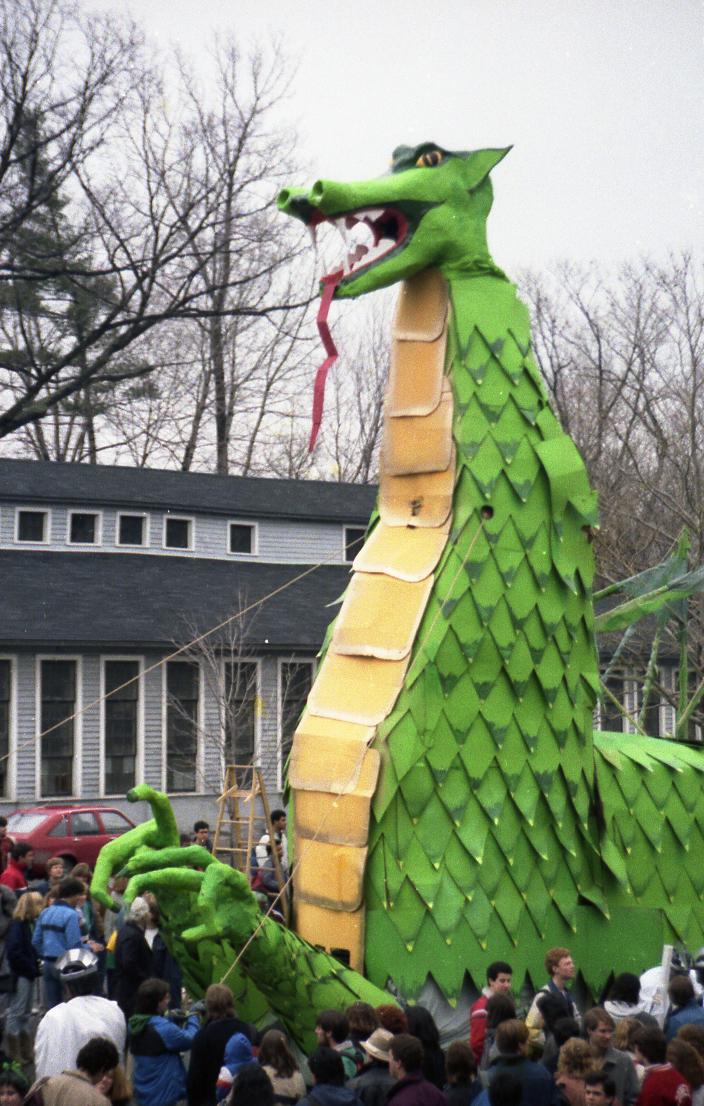
Dragon Day in 1986

Dragon Day is an annual celebration that began in 1901, known as the "College of Architecture Day", and occurs, traditionally, on the Thursday before St Patrick's Day. It now occurs on the Friday before Cornell University's Spring Break. The central event is the burning of a dragon designed and built by Architecture first years at the hands of the oldest fifth year Architecture student, with the help of the Ithaca Fire Department, on the Arts Quad. As of 2009, burning the Dragon itself is no longer permitted.

=== Impromptu student activities ===
While Cornell students are no stranger to such activities as streaking, screaming before finals, or flash mobs, other impromptu activities are more specific to Cornell and its unique terrain:

Traying down Libe Slope: Undergraduates were known to smuggle trays from the dining options in Willard Straight Hall or from the dormitory dining halls and use them to sled down Cornell's Libe Slope, a 100-foot hill stretching from Cornell West Campus to Uris Library, the undergraduate home of the Cornell University Library.

Gorgeing: Over the summer, and at the beginning and end of the academic year when Ithaca enjoys warmer weather, students are known to find respite from the heat in the two creeks that cut across Cornell's campus through two dramatic gorges, Cascadilla and Fall Creek. While the activity is illegal due to safety concerns, and several students have drowned while enjoying the gorges, it does not deter students from swimming in the various swimming holes, playing in the waterfalls, or jumping off of Lover's Leap north of Beebe Lake into the pool of water thirty feet below.

=== Slope Day ===
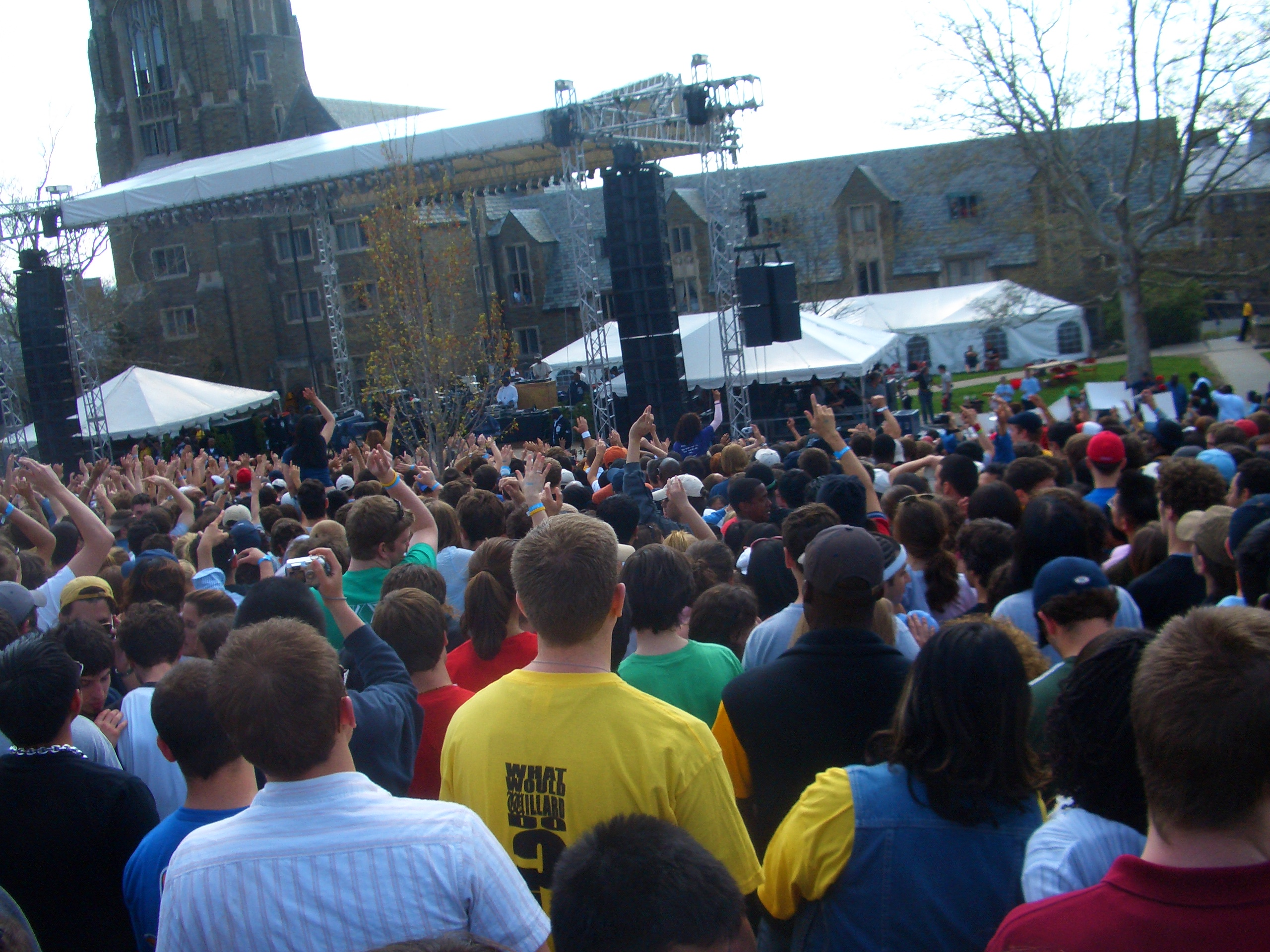
Snoop Dogg performing during Slope Day in 2005

Slope Day is an annual day of celebration, held on the last full day of classes (usually the first Friday of May). Though Slope Day has gone through many reincarnations since its inception in 1901, in recent years focus has shifted to live musical performances open to the Cornell community and a select number of guests. Students gather on Libe Slope to enjoy the music and party. Recent performers include Ben Folds, Snoop Dogg, Kanye West, The Game, O.A.R., Dilated Peoples, Rusted Root, Fat Joe, TV on the Radio, T.I., Flo Rida, and A Boogie Wit da Hoodie. Slope Day is often criticized for the excessive drinking and drug consumption that many students participate in before, during, and after the scheduled events.

In recent years, Slope Day has become more regulated, in an effort to stop underage drinking on the Slope. In order to regulate drinking, the Slope itself has been fenced off and entrances have been placed for ID checks. All who enter must wear a wristband denoting their student status.

Drinks for those over 21 and food are available for purchase inside the fenced off area.

=== Hot Truck and Louie's Lunch ===
Louie's Lunch truck

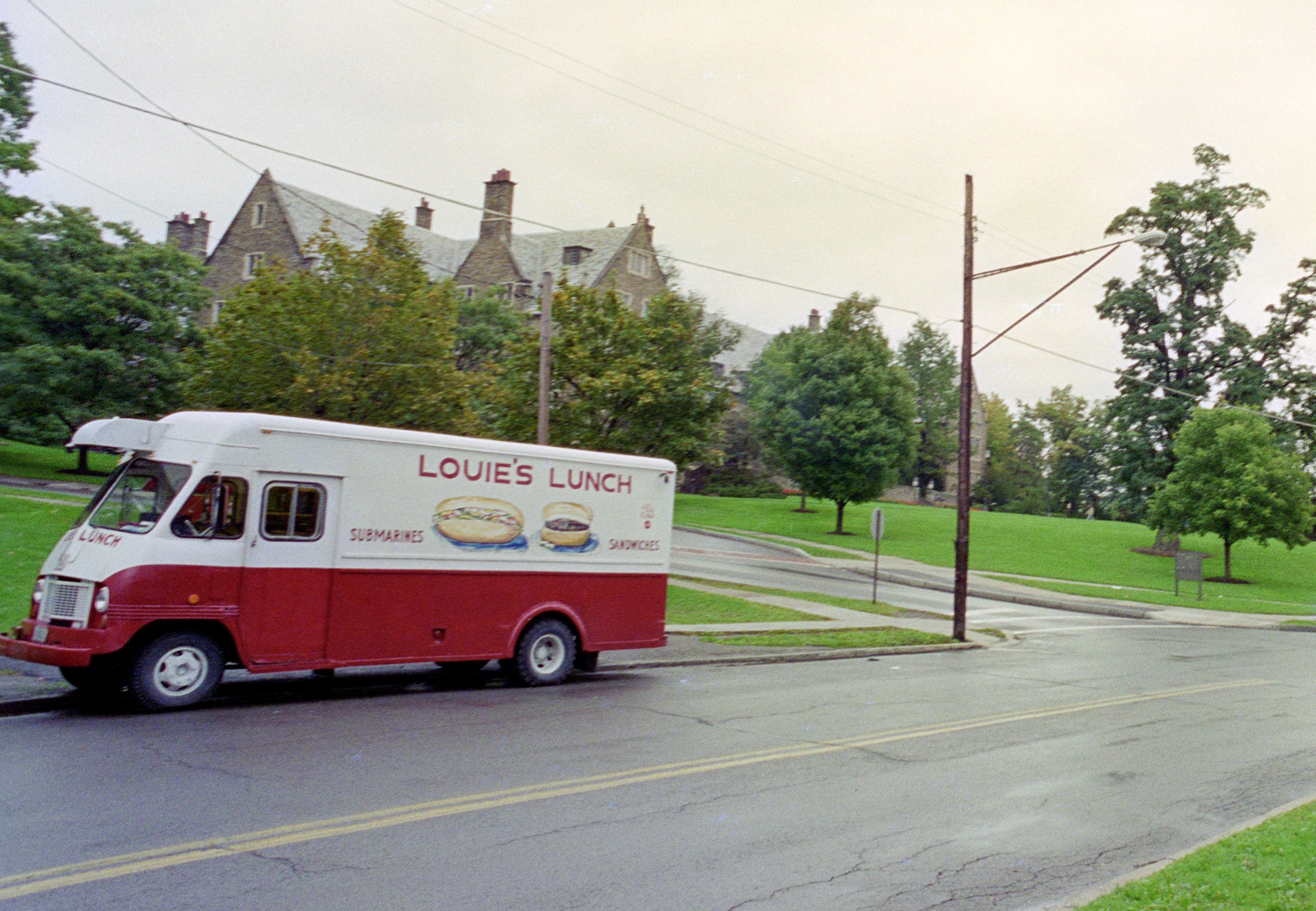
Louie's Lunch truck in 1994

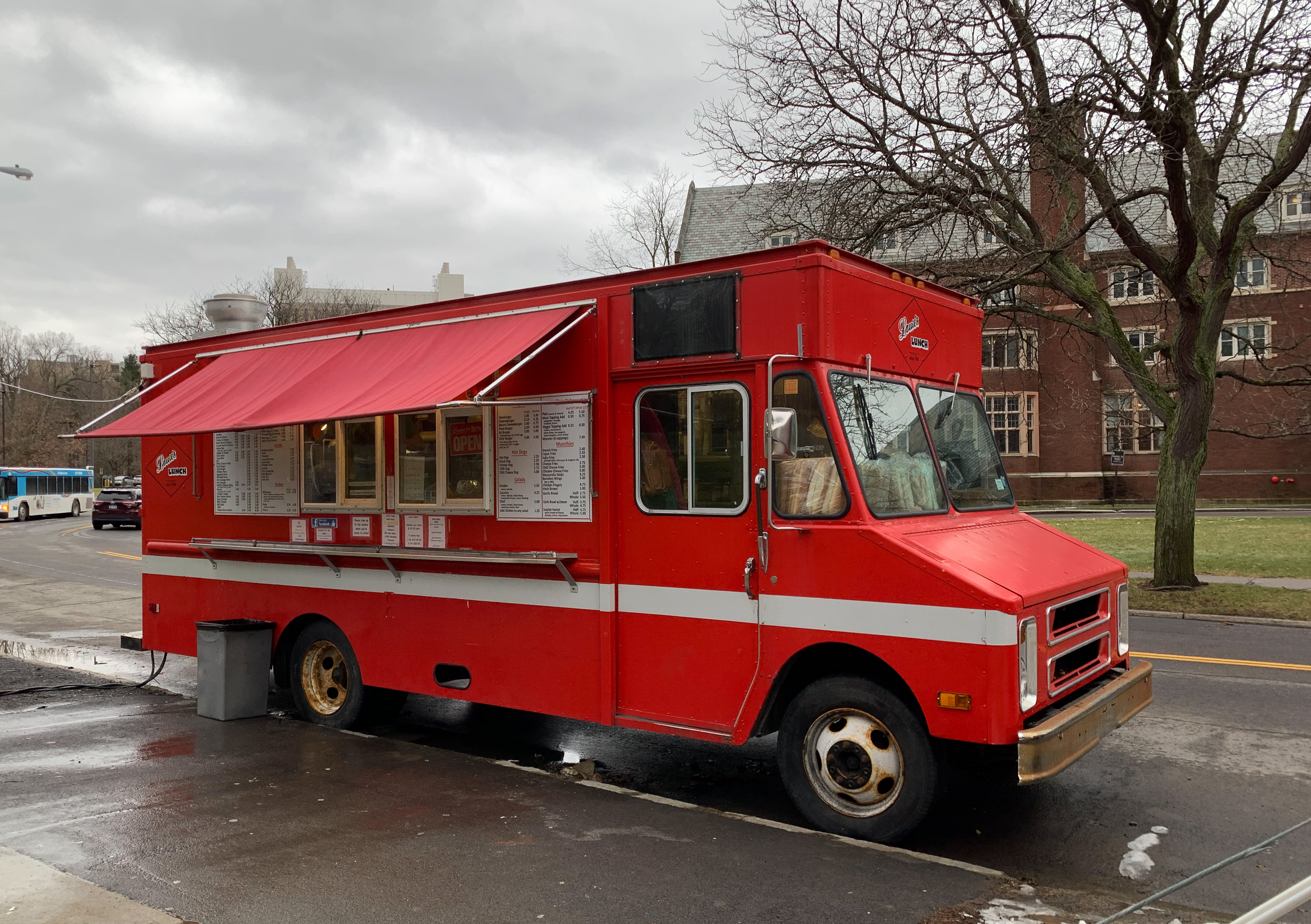
Louie's Lunch truck in 2020

For years, there were two food trucks on Cornell's campus, the Hot Truck and Louie's Lunch. Louie's Lunch, or just "Louie's", was created in 1916 by Greek immigrant Louis Zounakos. Its original incarnation was a food cart that he pushed around campus, which he soon replaced with a Ford truck. In the late 1940s, Louie bought a custom-made red-and-white truck and stationed it across the street from Risley Hall. Between 1962 and 1981, Louie's Lunch was located on West Campus and renamed "The Cold Truck", because it only sold cold foods such as coldcuts.

"The Hot Truck", also known as "Johnny's Pizza Truck", was stationed below West Campus beginning in March 1960, "The Hot Truck". The name came from owner Bob Petrillose's desire to differentiate himself from the cold truck. The Hot Truck sold just pizza subs. Petrillose determined soon after opening that he could cut costs by only selling pizza. Bob discovered that he could produce a superior pizza when he put the toppings on buttered French bread. He dubbed his creation the PMP (or "Poor Man's Pizza"), which has since been brought to national popularity by Stouffer's. At some time meatballs were added to PMP's, effectively expanding the menu to include meatball subs. The sub product with meatballs, cheese, and tomato sauce was named the MBC (Meatball and Cheese). A "Hot Truck Dictionary" was published in the form of a small booklet listing novel names of menu items and creative yet odd terminology for toppings. One undated copy believed to have been collected during the mid-1980s shows menu items such as RaRa (roast beef sub with pepperoni and mozzarella), ReRe (roast beef sub with sausage and mozzarella), and Sep Pep (Double PMP, garlic, mushrooms, and pepperoni). Regular customers, who were generally students, would order at the truck window using the appropriate odd terminology.

Over the years, the variety of pizzas has expanded with complete dictionary of combinations of varying peculiarity created by students, such as the "North Baker", which has garlic, mozzarella, pizza sauce, mustard, lettuce, and sour cream and onion potato chips. The Hot Truck is now owned by Shortstop Deli, which also serves its subs. The Hot Truck founder, Bob Petrillose, died on December 8, 2008.

=== Sy Katz Parade ===
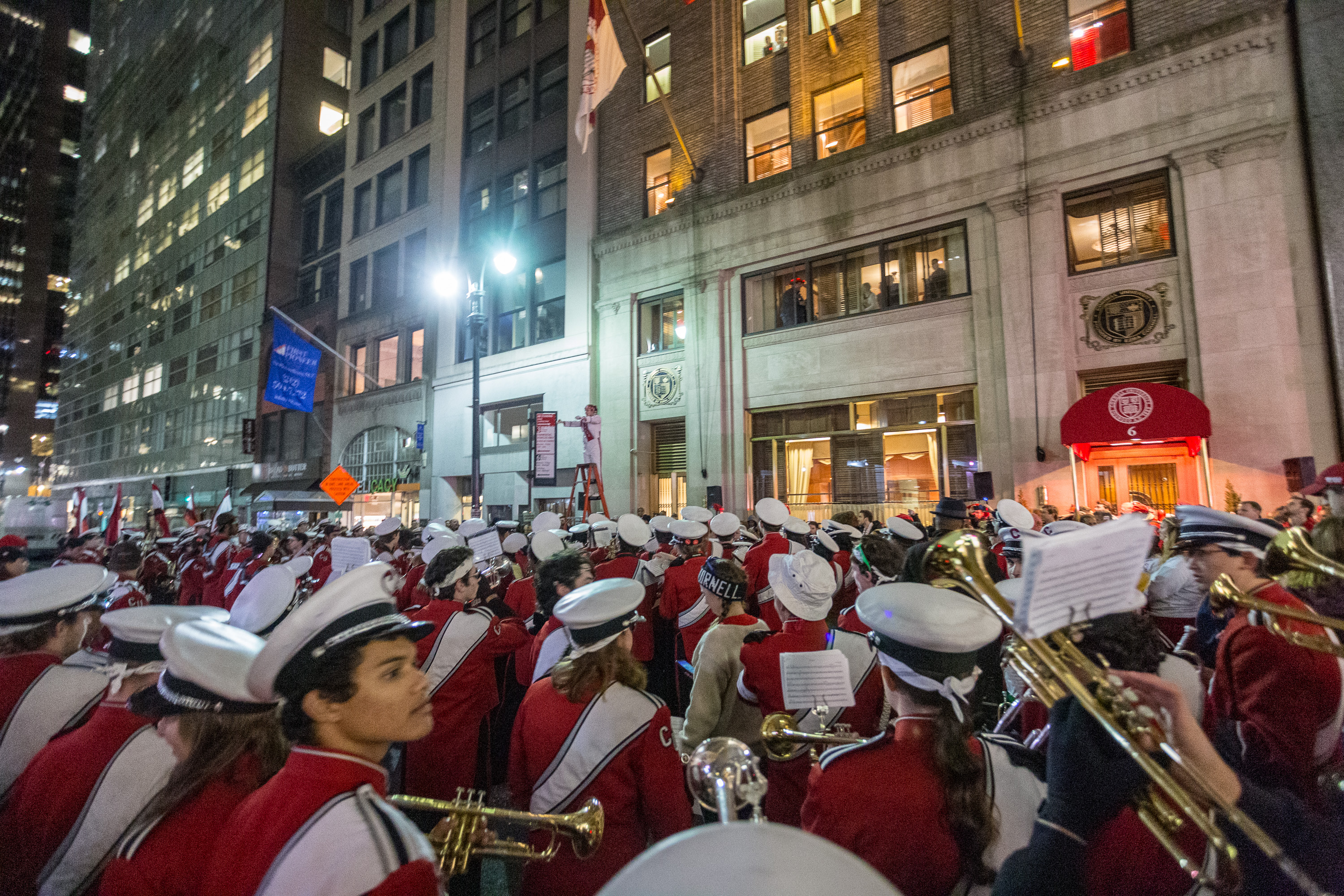
Sy Katz Parade in 2018

The Sy Katz '31 Parade is a biennial march in New York City, which takes place on dates when the Cornell football team travels to Columbia in New York City. After the game, the Big Red Marching Band and cheerleading squad lead Cornell alumni, family, and friends down a short stretch of Fifth Avenue, ending with a concert in front of the Cornell Club of New York at 6 East 44th Street. The tradition was started in 1972 by Seymour "Sy" Katz '31 and was the length of one city block. The 2016 parade was headed by Provost Michael Kotlikoff as grand marshal. The 2018 parade, led by Cornell former president Martha E. Pollack, marched from Rockefeller Center to the Cornell Club, attended by some 1,000 Cornell alumni, family members and friends.

=== Athletic traditions ===
As the most popular sport on campus, many of Cornell athletic traditions revolve around the Cornell men's ice hockey team, and their fans, the Lynah Faithful. These include the famed Cornell-Harvard hockey rivalry, often considered one of the most intense in collegiate hockey, which annually features fish being thrown at Harvard hockey players when they take to the ice at Lynah Rink, and Cornell students and alumni turning the Bright Hockey Center in Allston, Massachusetts into "Lynah East" once a year. Win, lose, or tie, the hockey team in Carnelian and White salutes the Faithful at the end of every home game before leaving the ice.

The Cornell Big Red Pep Band leads the Faithful through a rendition of the Alma Mater at every hockey game. Thanks to this tradition, Cornellians tend to know the words to their song more so than students at many other schools. Additionally, on the night of the last home hockey game of the year, all six verses of the song are sung by students.

Other traditions abound throughout Cornell Athletics. Every year, the Cornell football team squares off against the University of Pennsylvania in the battle for the Trustee's Cup. At Schoellkopf Field, freshmen have traditionally taken the field by storm for the first home game of the year, while seniors take the field for the final home game of the year. Many traditions are passed down through the Cornell Big Red Marching Band, which calls itself "the only real marching band in the Ivy League", including the annual concert within Cornell's undergraduate library, Uris Library, the morning of the last home game of the year.

== Student requirements ==
=== New Student Reading Project ===
A recently begun Cornell tradition is the New Student Reading Project, sometimes called the Freshmen Reading Project. Begun for the Class of 2005, all incoming freshmen and transfer students were required to read a book chosen by the university. Alumni and faculty were also encouraged to read the book. When students arrived, they participated in discussion groups and other activities related to the book. In the fall of 2005, for instance, Chinua Achebe came to Cornell and discussed his Things Fall Apart ('09). Other books have been Guns, Germs, and Steel ('05), Frankenstein ('06), Antigone ('07), The Trial ('08), The Great Gatsby ('10), The Pickup ('11), Lincoln at Gettysburg ('12), The Grapes of Wrath ('13), Do Androids Dream of Electric Sheep? ('14), Homer & Langley ('15), The Life Before Us ('16), When the Emperor was Divine ('17), Clash of Civilizations Over an Elevator in Piazza Vittorio ('18), and Slaughterhouse Five ('19). The tradition was discontinued in 2016, and no book was assigned to the Class of '20.

=== Swim test ===
In 1918, at the urging of the Director of Women's Physical Education, Cornell began requiring that all female students must pass a swim test before graduating. In 1937, the school expanded the swim test requirement to all undergraduates. Despite reviews of this policy over the years, all students — with the exception of transfer students — must pass a swim test. The original swim test was administered as two-laps in the Old Armory Pool, which was half Olympic length. When the men's swim test was transferred to the Teagle Hall pool, the distance was preserved. When the women's swim test was transferred to the Olympic length pool in Helen Newman Hall in 1963, the number of laps was preserved. This disparity continued until 1970, when Trustee Robert Platt raised the issue of why women were required to swim twice as far as men to pass the test. Students who fail or do not take the swim test are enrolled in an introductory swimming course. The requirement was suspended for students graduating during the fall 2020 or spring 2021 semesters due to the COVID-19 pandemic. The current swim test is a continuous 25-yard swim where students are allowed to swim with any stroke of their choice.

Colleges and universities with similar swimming requirements include Bryn Mawr College, Columbia University, Dartmouth College, Hamilton College, Swarthmore College, the University of Chicago, University of Notre Dame, Washington and Lee University, Williams College, and the United States service academies.

== Cornell songs ==
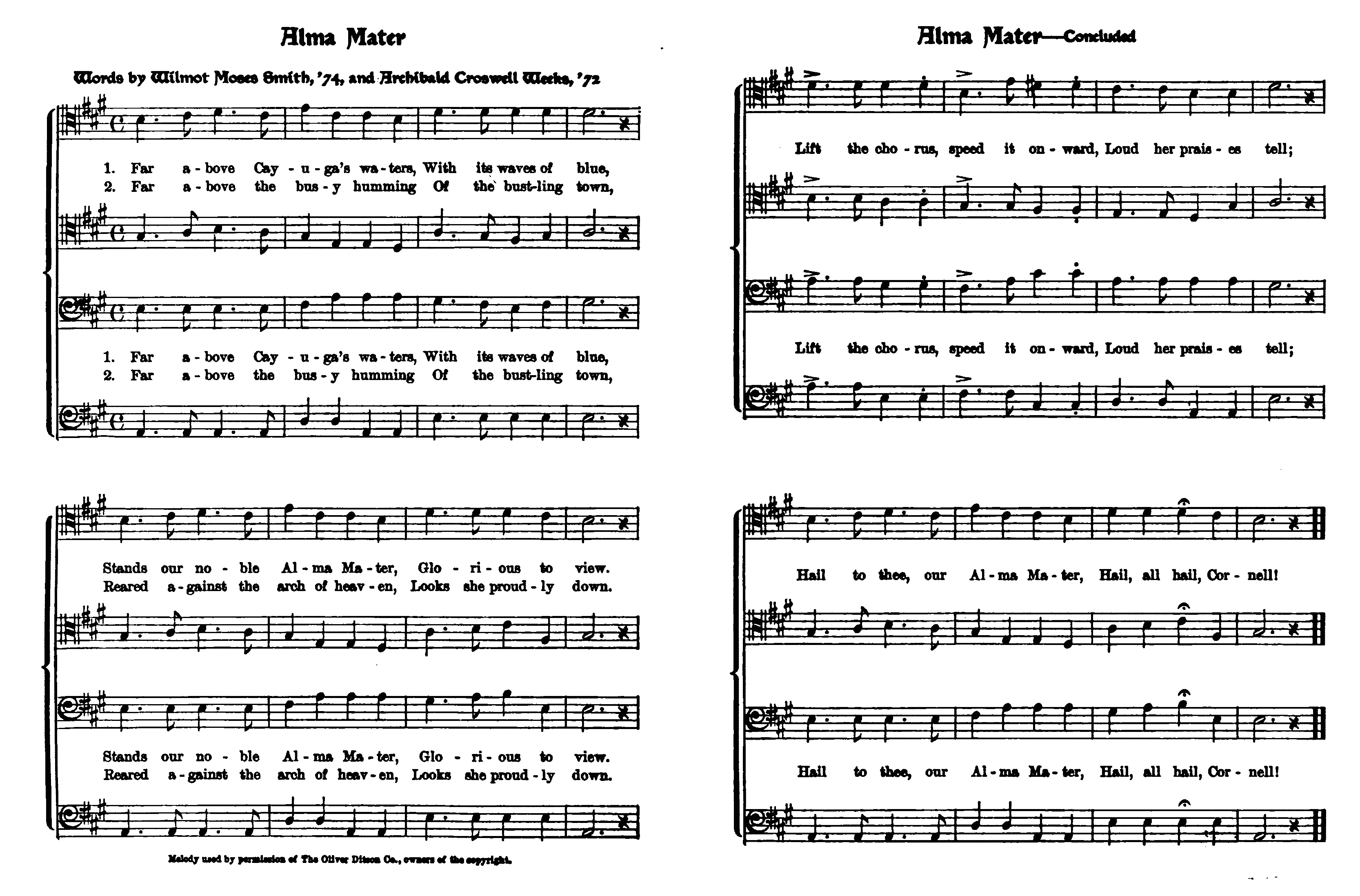
"Far Above Cayuga's Waters" as printed in Songs of Cornell in 1906

Like many colleges in the United States, Cornell has a number of traditional songs associated with the Cornell University Glee Club and Cornell Big Red Marching Band, from fight songs to the alma mater.

=== "Far Above Cayuga's Waters" ===
"Far Above Cayuga's Waters" is Cornell's alma mater. The lyrics were composed in 1870 by two roommates to the tune of "Annie Lisle", a popular ballad of the day. The song is considered to be one of the best known alma maters in the world as it has been adapted and adopted by numerous universities, colleges, and high schools both in the United States and the world. The song traditionally concludes campus concerts by the Cornell University Glee Club and Chorus.

=== "Give My Regards to Davy" ===
"Give My Regards to Davy" is Cornell's primary fight song. It was written in 1904 by three roommates at Beta Theta Pi to the tune of George M. Cohan's "Give My Regards to Broadway". Cornellians sing this song at sporting events, especially ice hockey.

=== "We Didn't Go To Harvard" ===
Sung by Cayuga's Waiters to the tune of Billy Joel's "We Didn't Start the Fire", this is one of the best known and popular a cappella songs in the Ivy League, and makes light of Cornell's reputation as a "safety school" for Harvard University applicants. The song features a rotating cast of verses that document the contemporary Cornell student experience.

== Legends ==
=== Arts Quad statues ===
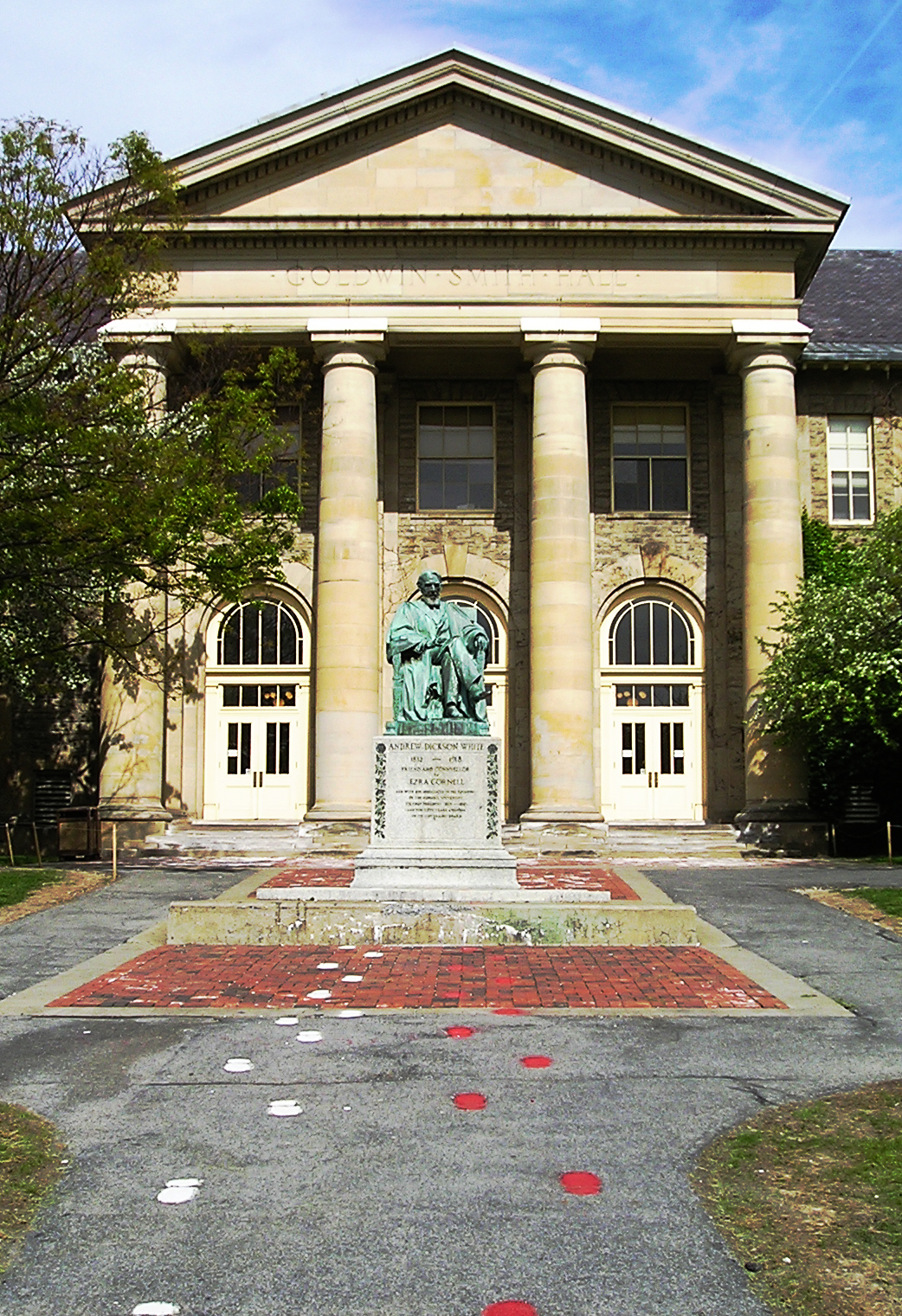
The statue of Andrew Dickson White

On the Arts Quad exist two statues memorializing the founders of Cornell, Ezra Cornell and Andrew Dickson White. According to legend, if a virgin crosses the Quad at midnight while the chimes are ringing, the two statues will walk off their pedestals, meet in the center of the Quad, and shake hands on the chastity of the university. Variants of this legend have it that they will take each other's place, or they will dance a jig to celebrate the student's purity. The statues have never switched places, shaken hands, or danced; Cornell's tour guides maintain this is because the bells do not ring at midnight. Every year since 1936, Phi Sigma Kappa has repainted footprints on the Quad to memorialize the legend.

=== Ghosts ===
The widow of Willard Straight made several reportedly unsuccessful attempts to contact her late husband through mediums. Hiram Corson (1828-1911), a Professor of Anglo-Saxon Literature, was purported to have had posthumous conversations with Robert Browning and Henry Wadsworth Longfellow. On a more permanent basis, ghosts are said to haunt several buildings on the Cornell campus.

In Risley Hall, the namesake of the dormitory, Prudence Risley, flits about the building, flickering the lights. During its days as the Residential Club, Ecology House suffered a fatal fire, whose victims are credited for strange lights and voices. Some say that the Statler Hotel is haunted by the building's namesake, Alice Statler; other buildings said to be haunted include the Undergraduate Admissions Office, McGraw Tower, and the Delta Kappa Epsilon, Sigma Chi and Lambda Chi Alpha fraternity houses among others.

If a bride is married in Sage Chapel, she will probably use the crypt to prepare since no other appropriate room exists in the chapel. Within that crypt are buried the founders and numerous other important contributors of the University. If the bride waits long enough, it is said the spirits may rise to bless the marriage.

=== Hoy Field ===
One campus legend says that the first person to hit a home run out of Cornell's baseball field was former U.S. president George H. W. Bush while he was a student at Yale University. Though Bush played at Hoy Field, this legend is not true. The first player to hit an outside-the-park home run was a student at Syracuse University. The second person to achieve this feat was Columbia University student and future baseball hall-of-famer Lou Gehrig on April 21, 1923.

=== Relationships ===
Many Cornell legends relate to relationships. One says that if a student refuses a kiss on the suspension bridge that stretches across Fall Creek next to the Johnson Museum of Art, the bridge will collapse into the gorge. Another legend says that if a couple walks around the entire perimeter of Beebe Lake while holding hands, the two are destined to be engaged. Yet another legend says that about 60% of Cornell students marry other Cornellians. In reality, the number is closer to 8%.

== Lore ==
=== Items atop the clocktower ===
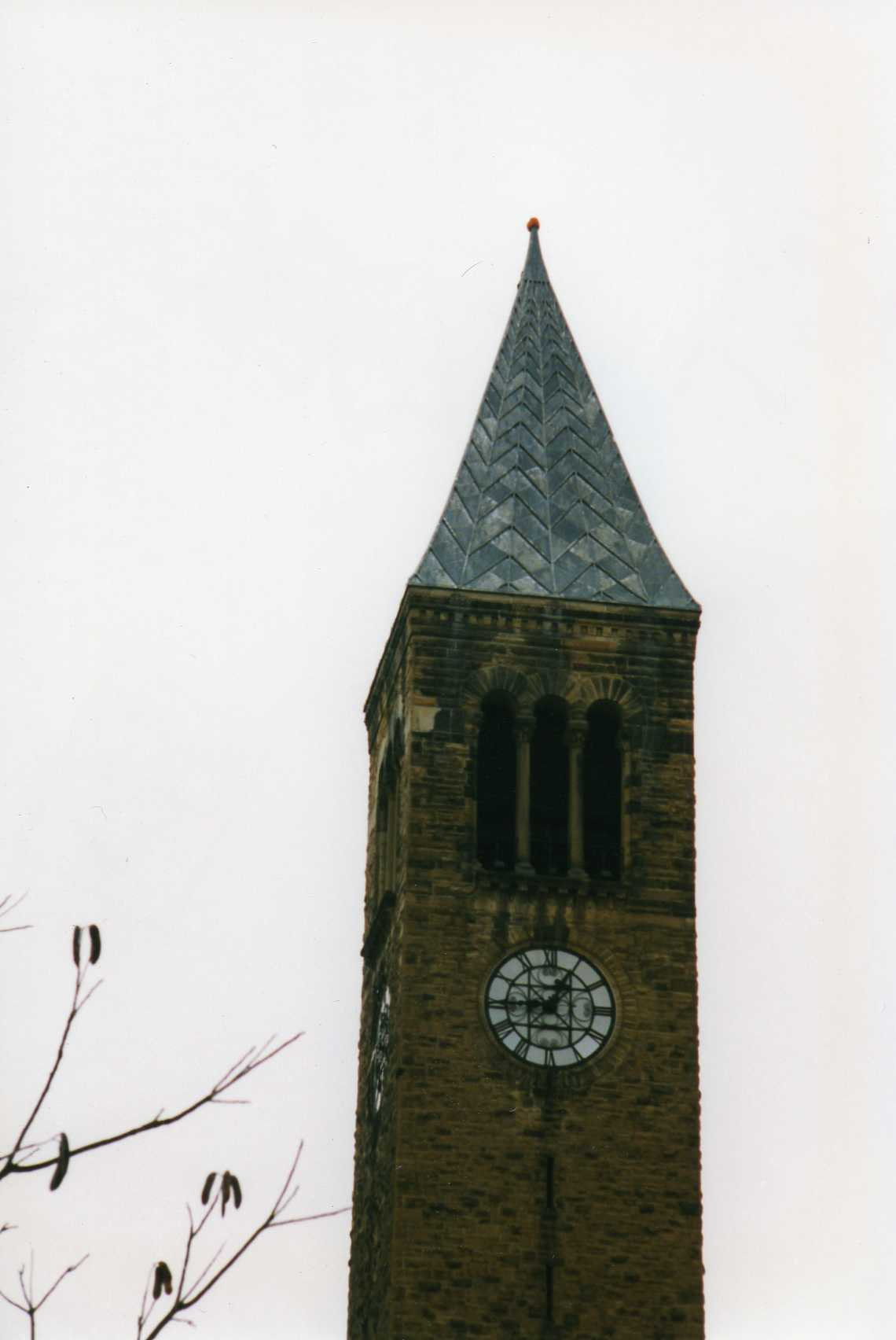
The pumpkin atop the McGraw Tower clocktower

Several times, students have placed items atop the 173-foot-tall spire of McGraw Tower as a prank.

- In October 1997, a pumpkin was found on top of the clocktower. A live internet video feed, nicknamed "PumpkinCam," enabled live viewing of the pumpkin around the world, a relatively new phenomenon at the time. How the pumpkin had been placed was a mystery that attracted national news attention. The pumpkin remained there until it was removed in March of the following year. It was found to have been cored, which accounted for its longevity as it naturally dried out. It has since been memorialized as an ice cream flavor, "Clocktower Pumpkin", produced by the Cornell Dairy. A piece of the pumpkin is stored in the Wilder Brain Collection.
- In April 2005, a disco ball was found tied onto the clocktower with climbing rope. According to the Cornell Police, someone gained access to the top of the clocktower by breaking a sealed hatch on the clocktower and then free-climbing up the roof.
- In December 2019, a red Santa hat adorned the clocktower; authorities speculated that it was probably lifted there by a drone.

=== Gettysburg Address ===
President Lincoln wrote out a manuscript of the Gettysburg Address, at the request of George Bancroft, a historian, in April 1864. Bancroft planned to include this copy in "Autograph Leaves of Our Country's Authors," which he planned to sell at a Soldiers' and Sailors' Sanitary Fair in Baltimore, Maryland. Since it was written on both sides of the paper, it proved unusable for this purpose, and Bancroft was allowed to keep it. This manuscript is the only one accompanied by a letter from Lincoln transmitting the manuscript and by the original envelope addressed and signed for free postage by Lincoln. This copy remained in the Bancroft family for many years until it was donated to the Carl A. Kroch Library at Cornell University by Nicholas H. Noyes and can be viewed by anyone who asks. Out of five known manuscripts, Cornell's copy is the only one owned by a private institution. Among historians, Cornell's manuscript is known as the Bancroft Copy.

=== Hugo N. Frye ===
In 1930, Republican leaders across the United States received letters inviting them to a celebration in Ithaca to celebrate the 150th birthday of Hugo N. Frye, the founder of the New York Republican Party and coiner of the immortal phrase "Freedom in the land of the free." Many leaders sent replies lauding the great work done by Frye, which were read at the celebration. Much to their embarrassment, a reporter for The New York Times got a hold of this story and discovered that Frye was the creation of Lester Blumner and Edward Horn, two editors for The Cornell Daily Sun.

=== Drinking clubs ===
During the 1970s, there were two remaining drinking societies at Cornell, The Majura Nolanda Society, an all-male society also known as Mummies "since 1896", and the Ivory Tower, an all-female "since 1895". Both groups met and drank together on Wednesday Nights at the Chapter House at 400 Stewart Avenue. The two societies were merged in 1975 at the urging of Thomas Coughlin, BSME Class of '76, then vice president and "Mummy". The Mummy was the mascot of the Majura Nolanda Society. The society met in a crypt in the cellar of the Chapter House and prior to the Cornell-Yale football game the Mummy would be Swaddled in a shroud, placed in a casket, and be driven around campus in a hearse to Schoellkopf Stadium. The group would be escorted to special seating on the fifty yard line. During half time the Mummy was permitted access to the field where he would caper about in drunken antic. The Mummy casket had a false bottom into which "contra-band" liquor would be concealed in an attempt to smuggle it into the stadium. This never worked! The Majura Nolanda Society also participated in various fund raising activities during the period. Upon joining the society a Mummie would be given a ceramic pint mug emblazoned with the words Cornell University, Majura Nolanda Bethel Amid, and Mummies. The "pint mugs" were of 18 ounce volume. The extra 2 ounces allowed for a full measure plus Foam.

=== Freshman beanies ===
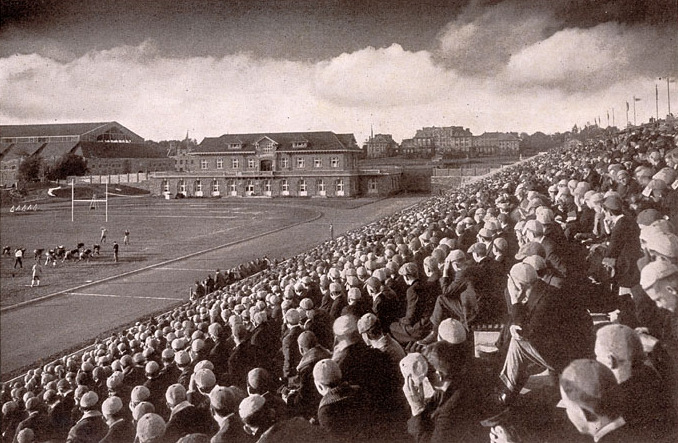
Freshmen wearing their beanies to a Cornell football game in 1919

In the first part of the 20th century, male freshmen at Cornell were required to follow eleven strict rules published in the freshman handbook. These ranged from "No smoking on campus" to "Give your trolley seat to an upperclassman." Number four on the list was "Wear your cap." The cap was a red beanie with a gray button on top. Freshmen boys wore their hats until the annual spring beanie burning. This rule was taken very seriously. One student, Frederick Morelli 1924, was chained to a tree for two hours and dunked in the lake for refusing to wear his cap, thus earning Cornell the name "Lynch College". By the 1960s, this tradition had disappeared.

=== The White library bell ===
When Andrew Dickson White returned to the United States in 1894 from his post as the minister to Russia, he brought back a 361-pound church bell. For many years, janitors rang the bell to warn students of the library's nightly closing. Due to complaints about the "booming resonance" of the bell, librarians began ringing a smaller bell to warn of White's bell. White's bell is stored in the Andrew Dickson White Reading Room in Uris Library.

=== Zinck's Night ===
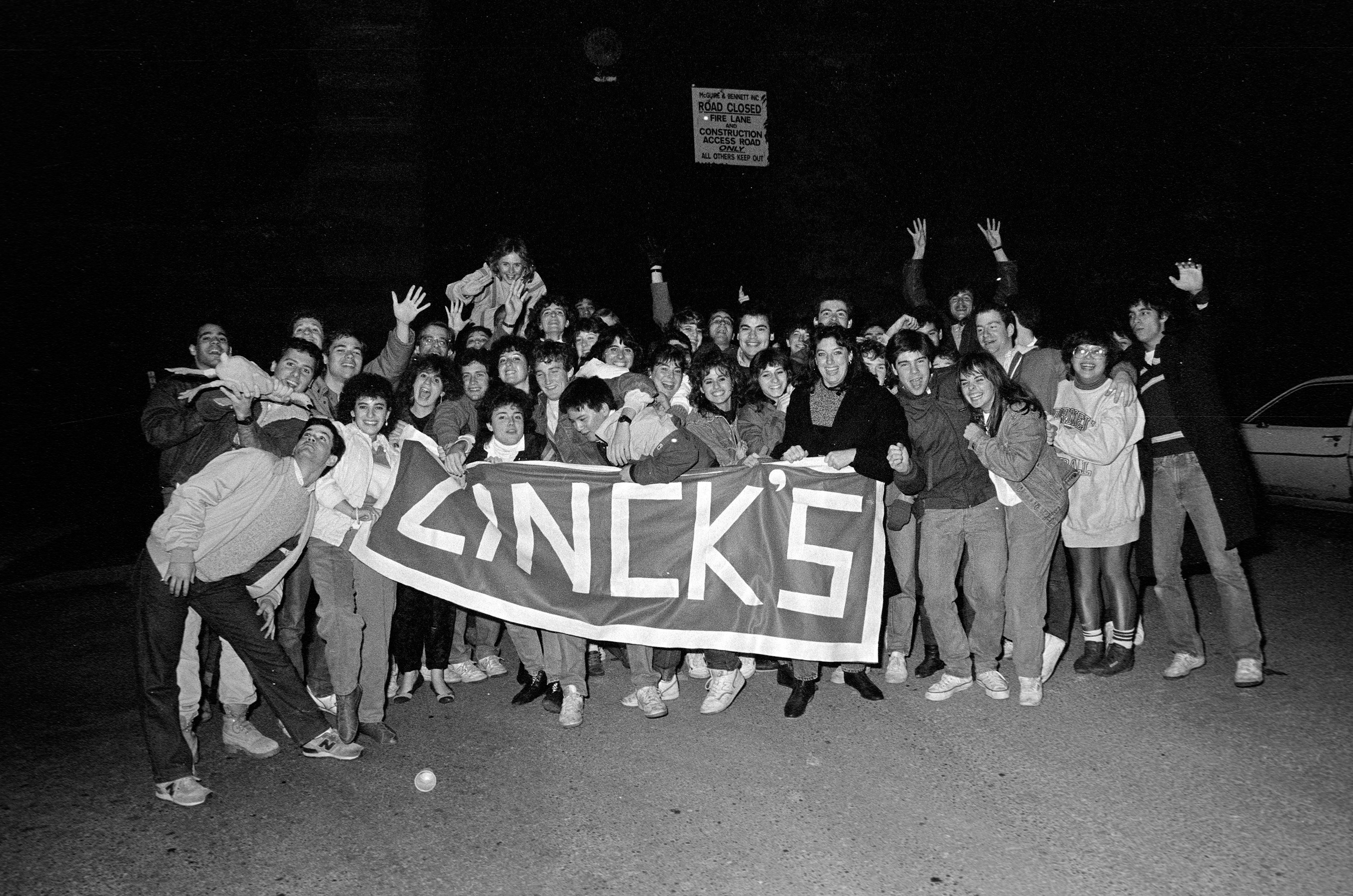
Spirit of Zincks Night outside Dunbar's in October 1987

Theodore Zinck was a saloonkeeper in Ithaca, and his pub, the Hotel Brunswick, was a popular gathering place for Cornellians in the 1890s. After his death in 1903, several bars using his name (Zinck's) continued to provide a haven for students. When the last Zinck's closed in the mid-1960s, celebrating the spirit of Zinck's became a favorite Thursday night Collegetown tradition for undergraduates. To this day, Cornell alumni around the world celebrate Zinck's night once a year, on a Thursday in October.

Zinck's is immortalized in the Cornell fight song "Give My Regards to Davy", with the following line: We'll all have drinks at Theodore Zinck's, When I get back next fall!
