= Thomas Frederick Crane =

American folklorist, academic and lawyer

Crane (left) and David Hoy (right) were immortalized in Cornell lore in the song "Give My Regards to Davy"

Thomas Frederick Crane (July 12, 1844, in New York – December 10, 1927) was an American folklorist, academic and lawyer.

He studied law at Princeton, earned his undergraduate degree in 1864, and in 1867 graduated with an A.M. He then studied law at Columbia Law School but moved to Ithaca when a relative there became ill. He was admitted to the bar and worked as a lawyer in the community and as a librarian for newly founded Cornell University. He went on to become a student of languages, and was offered a faculty position by President A.D. White and taught French, Italian, Spanish, and medieval literature. He was among the founders of the Journal of American Folklore. He also served as the first Dean of the Arts College and later as acting president of the university. As a young faculty member, he became one of the first members of the Cornell Chapter of Kappa Alpha Society. In 1877, he was elected as a member to the American Philosophical Society.

Today, he is remembered in Cornell's fight song, "Give My Regards to Davy", whose lyrics begin "Give my regards to Davy / Remember me to Tee Fee Crane. "Tee Fee Crane" was a nickname given to Crane by students.

He is particularly noted for his collection Italian Popular Tales. Many of its tales were published in the popular children's magazine St. Nicholas Magazine.
