= Cornell Big Red Marching Band =

Marching band in the Ivy League

The Cornell University Big Red Marching Band
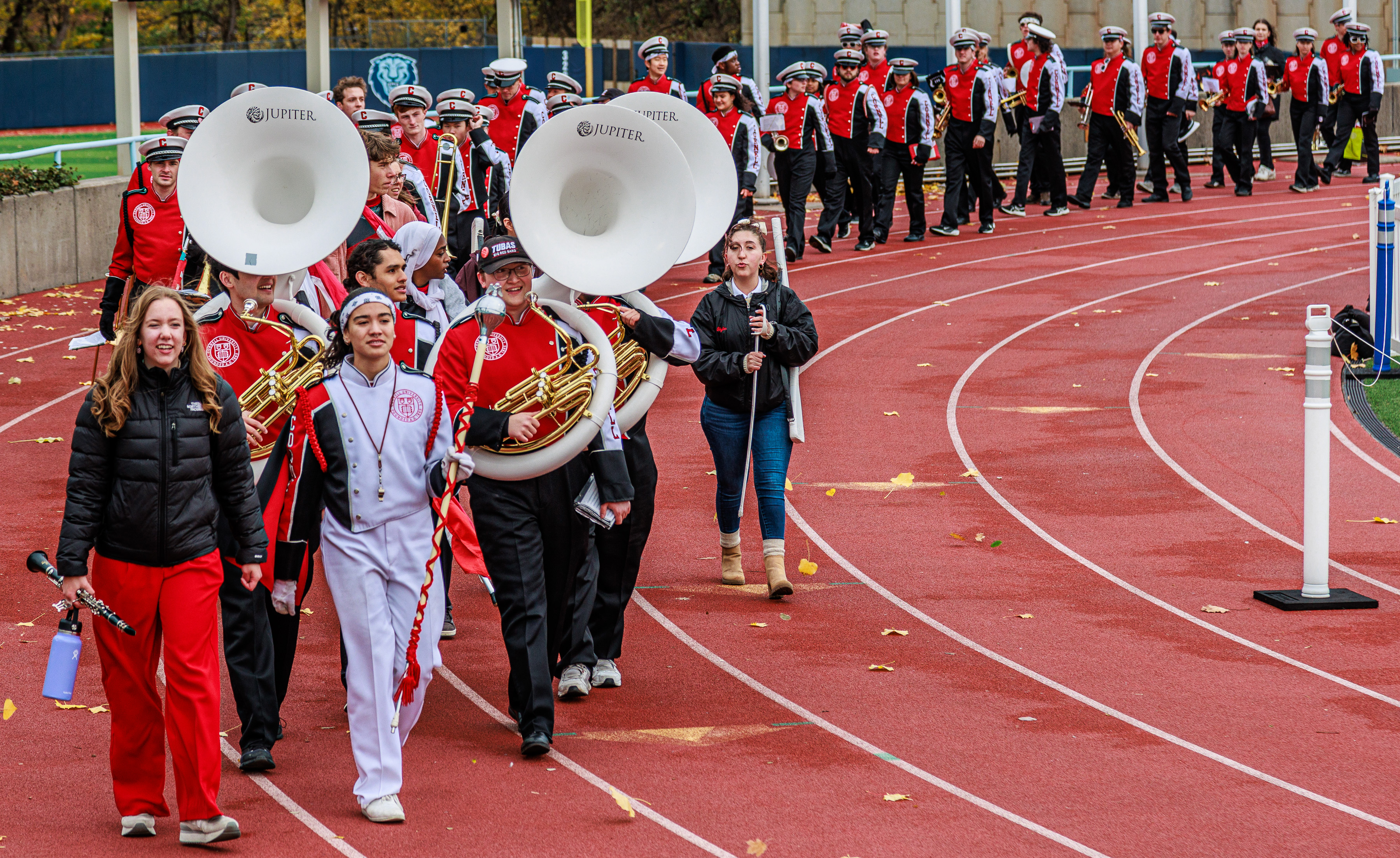
- 2024 band enters Columbia's Wien Stadium
- School: Cornell University
- Location: Ithaca, NY
- Conference: Ivy League
- Founded: 1890s
- Members: roughly 250
- Fight song: "Give My Regards to Davy"
- Motto: "The Only REAL Marching Band in the Ivy League"
- Website: Big Red Bands

The Cornell Big Red Marching Band is the only corps style marching band (as opposed to a scatter band) in the Ivy League. It performs at all home, and most away, Cornell Big Red football games. In addition, the band has performed at halftime for numerous National Football League and Canadian Football League games, and began a tradition of an annual Spring Concert in 2006. Since 1972, the band has held a bi-annual march in New York City which takes place on dates when the Cornell football team travels to Columbia University, known as the Sy Katz '31 Parade.

== History ==
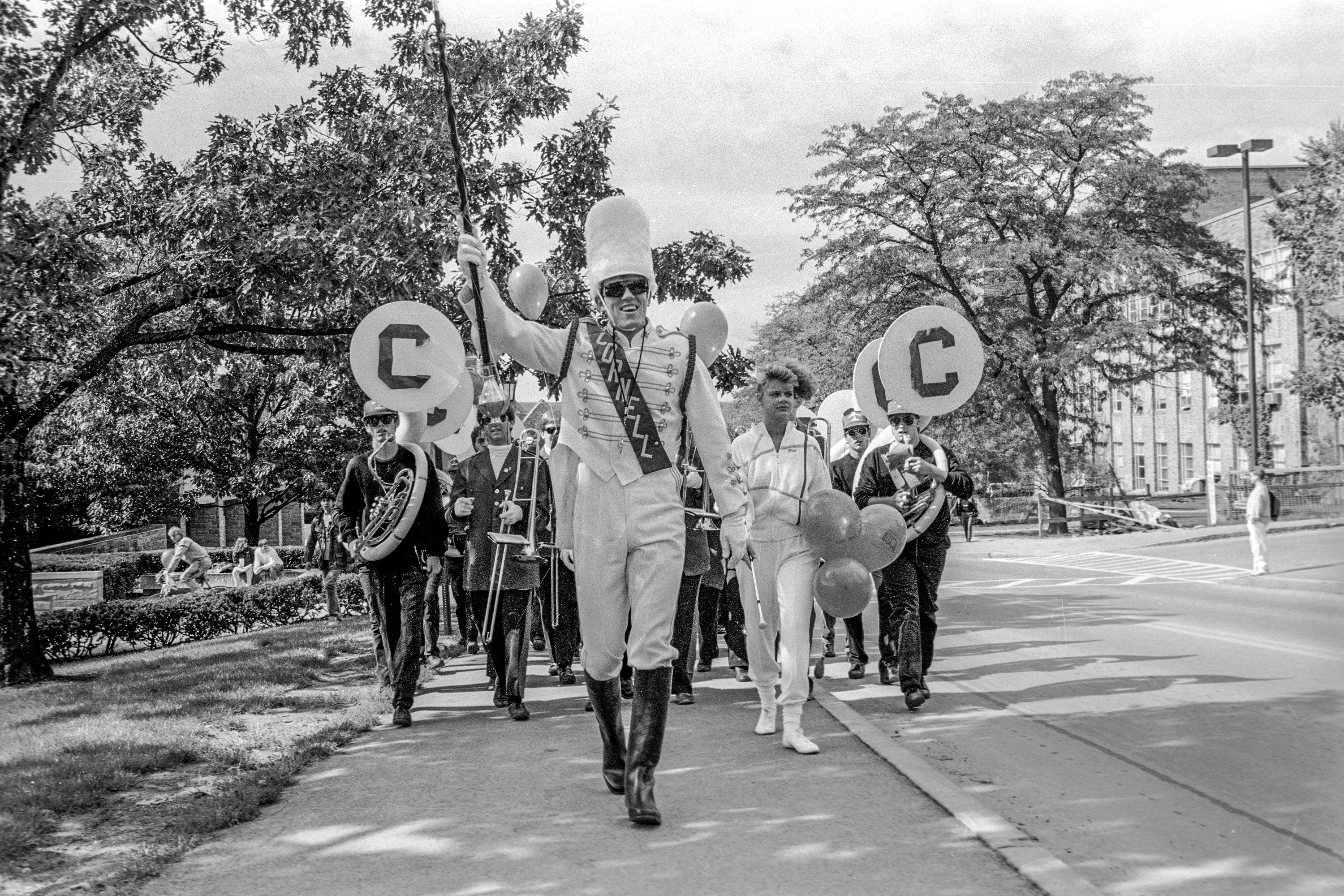
1987

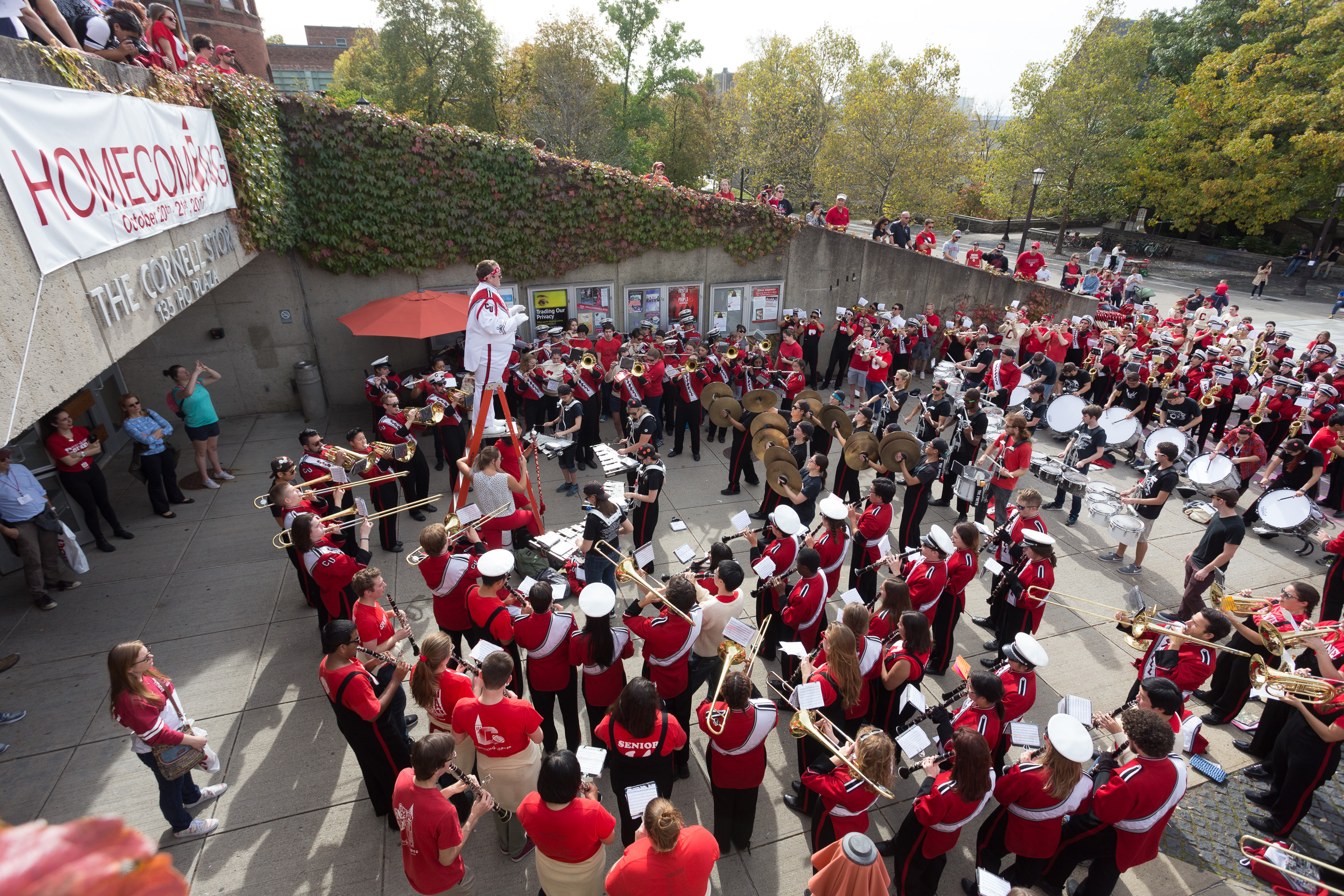
Homecoming 2017

The band was first formed in the 1890s as a part of the Reserve Officers' Training Corps program.

The band remained under ROTC jurisdiction until 1948, at which time the band became affiliated with the Cornell Concert Band and the Cornell Repertory Band under the name Cornell Bands. After the BRMB left its military roots, it continued to evolve. Instrumental figures in overseeing these changes included William Campbell, the Director of Bands from 1947 to 1965, and Henry Romersa, assistant director and Drillmaster. Also crucial in these "silver age" bands was Nick Krukovsky '65, who for many years was the band's official cameraman/movie editor.

These changes would significantly alter the face of the band almost as much as its split from ROTC. With the admittance of women beginning in 1970, the BRMB became an increasingly social organization.

In previous years, the band aspired to be a Big Ten type marching band. However, during the early 1970s the band revolted against the strict disciplinary style of conventional marching bands and almost succumbed to campus pressure to become a scatter band like the other Ivy League bands. In 1971, the marching band became quite similar to the scatter bands in appearance, with the drum major wearing either a blazer or a dinner jacket. However, the band eventually returned to its traditional roots, and in 1978, the traditional drum major uniform returned for good. Rather than the high-stepping Big Ten style of marching, the band now uses a modern "corps-style" marching technique (similar to Southeastern Conference marching bands) during performances.

The Band continued its tradition of entertaining shows and musical excellence. In 1971, the Band welcomed the talents of new Assistant Director Greg Pearson. He had a definite vision for the band's musicality, from his arrangement of pre-game and halftime shows, to his decision to switch the band to the crescent (home team) side of Schoellkopf Field. While this moved the band away from the student section, it allowed the band to sound better with the concrete background and height offered by the crescent.

=== Alumni Association founded ===
In 1982 the Big Red Bands Alumni Association was established. The BRBAA was founded as a way to maintain the financial and long-term security of the Band. Since then, the BRBAA has become one of the most active alumni groups at Cornell. During this time, band advisor Georgian Leonard spearheaded the first annual phonathon.

With the retirement of Professor Marice Stith, Scott Jeneary came aboard as Big Red Band Music Director in 1989, and the position was later restructured and renamed Music Advisor. David Conn served as music advisor from the late 90s through 2004, succeeded by James Miller through 2006 and then Erin Otto. The position of music advisor is now typically occupied by a graduate student from Ithaca College. The band claims to be the largest student-run group in the Ivy League. Students handle nearly all responsibilities handled by directors with other marching bands, including managing budgets and charting drills.

=== Fischell Band Center ===
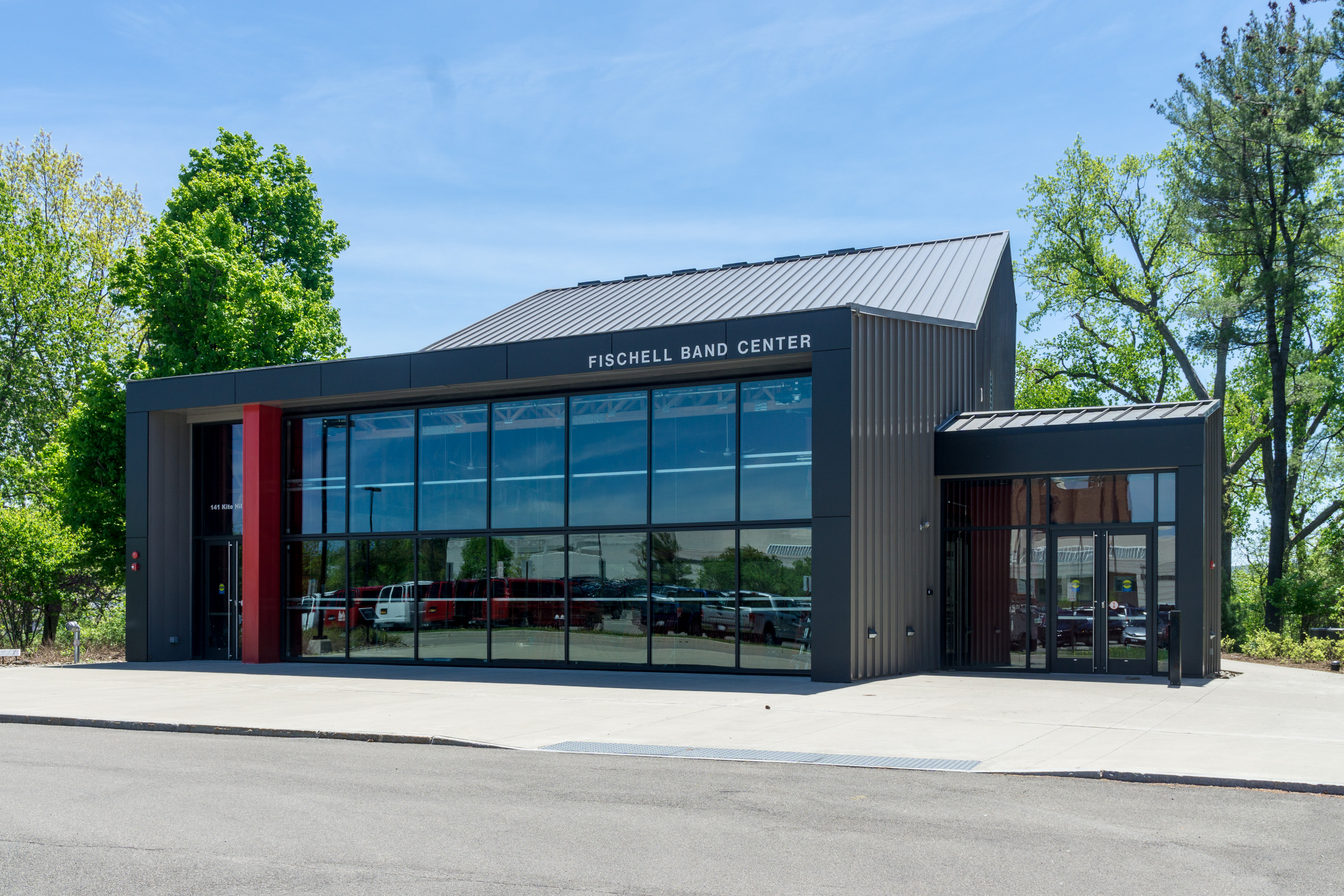
Fischell Band Center

For over a century, the Big Red Band was housed in a cramped room in Barton Hall. In 2013 the Fischell Band Center, a purpose-built home for the band, was completed adjacent to Schoellkopf Crescent on Kite Hill. The building is a three-story glass structure with slanted walls and ceilings for superior acoustics. It also includes display cases for memorabilia, photos, and uniforms.

== Uniforms ==
Uniforms

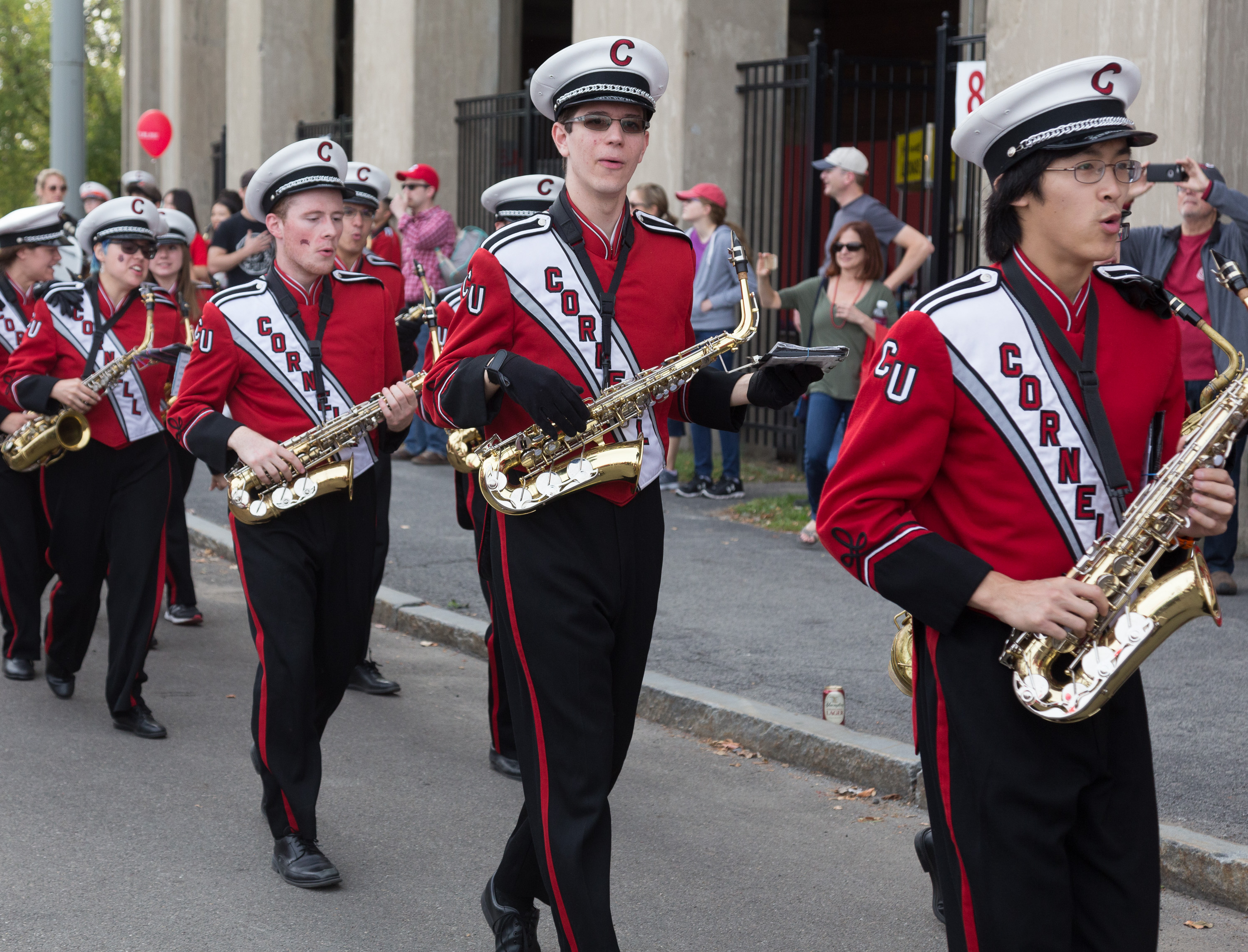
2017 uniforms

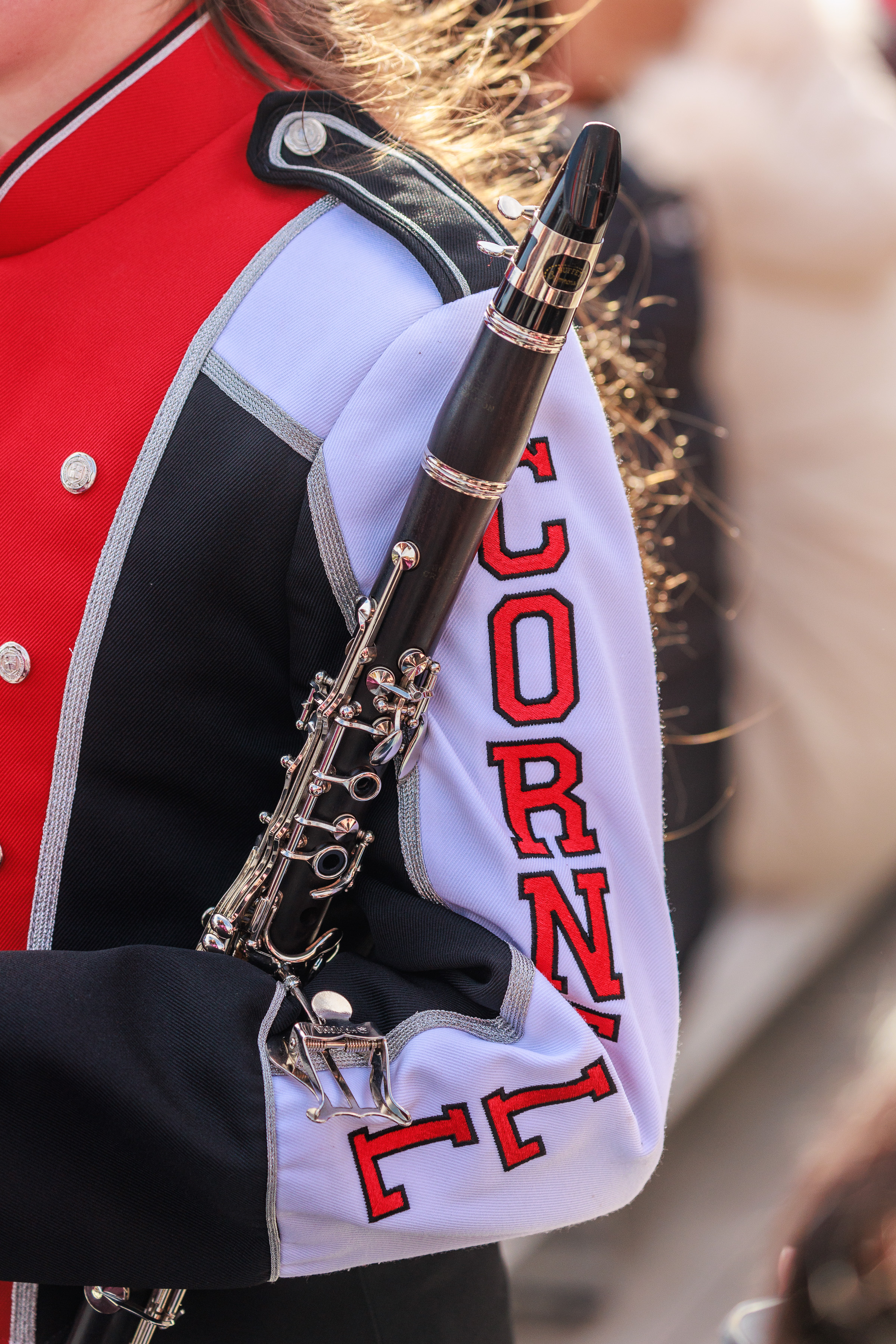
2024 uniform detail

Prior to 1927, band uniforms consisted of "not quite white" hats, "not quite white" sweaters and "not quite white" duck trousers. New uniforms in bright red, with white belts and black and gold helmets were ordered that year by ROTC commandant Col. Joseph Beacham '97, at a cost of $2,500. A formal ball in Barton Hall was held to raise money for the new uniforms.

Prior to 2021, the uniform consisted of black pants with red vertical stripe, red coat with "Cornell" emblazoned on the front, black shoes, black gloves, white combination cap with a red "C".

The band debuted an all-new uniform design in September 2021 at the Homecoming game against VMI. The new uniform kept the black pants and red coat, and incorporates a black-and-white left sleeve with the word CORNELL in red. The new uniform also features the university seal on the upper right chest area.

== Traditions ==
=== Aardvark ===
As originally performed, the aardvark was executed upright with the hands wiggling next to the ears. It has since evolved into a display during which the aardvarker, suspended from a railing, ladder, or other fixed object, warbles a series of shrill, upper register pitches as he bends his spine backward and shakes his arms wildly. No one is certain why this traditional exhibition was named after the burrowing, insectivorous mammal native to South Africa.

=== Post Game Concert ===
In 1947, as a result of an unfortunate incident which occurred during a gridiron encounter, the marching band started the tradition of a post game concert. In this particular game, a top-notch sophomore quarterback named Pete Dorset completed an amazing ten out of ten passes to lead Cornell to an upset 28–21 victory over Princeton at Palmer Stadium.

After the game, the jubilant members of the Big Red Band commenced to file out with the crowd as usual, but were beset by hecklers. Soon the band found itself involved in a small-scale riot. One Tigertown student snatched a trumpet; another attempted to wrest a tuba from its owner. Things quieted down quickly and the incident was soon forgotten. The next time the Big Red Band appeared at Princeton, it remained for an impromptu concert until the main body of spectators had filed out. The concert proved such a success that it was made a regular part of the band's schedule.

=== Victory Hats ===
At the end of each winning football game, band members turn each other's hats around 180 degrees. They remain backwards until removed at the end of the performing day.

=== Alumni Band ===
Each Homecoming weekend, Big Red Band alumni return to Ithaca, brush the cobwebs from their instruments, and join the Big Red Alumni Band. The first Alumni Band in 1982 was the brainchild of Drum Major Dwight Vicks III and Head Manager Bob Geise. The band grows in size each year as bandsmen from seven decades renew old friendships and find common bonds with fellow bandies from other eras.

=== Trumpet Push-ups, Flute-ups, and Sax-ups ===
After the Cornell Big Red scores in football, the trumpet section demonstrates their appreciation by doing pushups for each point scored by the team. In addition, the flute section also joins in with a series of "flute ups"; the section tosses a member of their section into the air for each point scored. Recently, the saxophone section has begun a similar tradition by lifting their saxes in the air while counting the points scored.

=== Trombones ===
The bones (trombone and baritone players) have a number of longstanding traditions to show their Big Red spirit and enthusiasm. The oldest of the section traditions, after the Big Red Band's final home halftime show of the season, the bones strip down into Hawaiian/loud shirts, shorts, and bare feet run around the track circling the football field and play the theme song to "Hawaii 5-O" as fast as possible. The bones also play holiday carols in mid-December, serenading students across campus.

=== Sy Katz '31 Parade ===
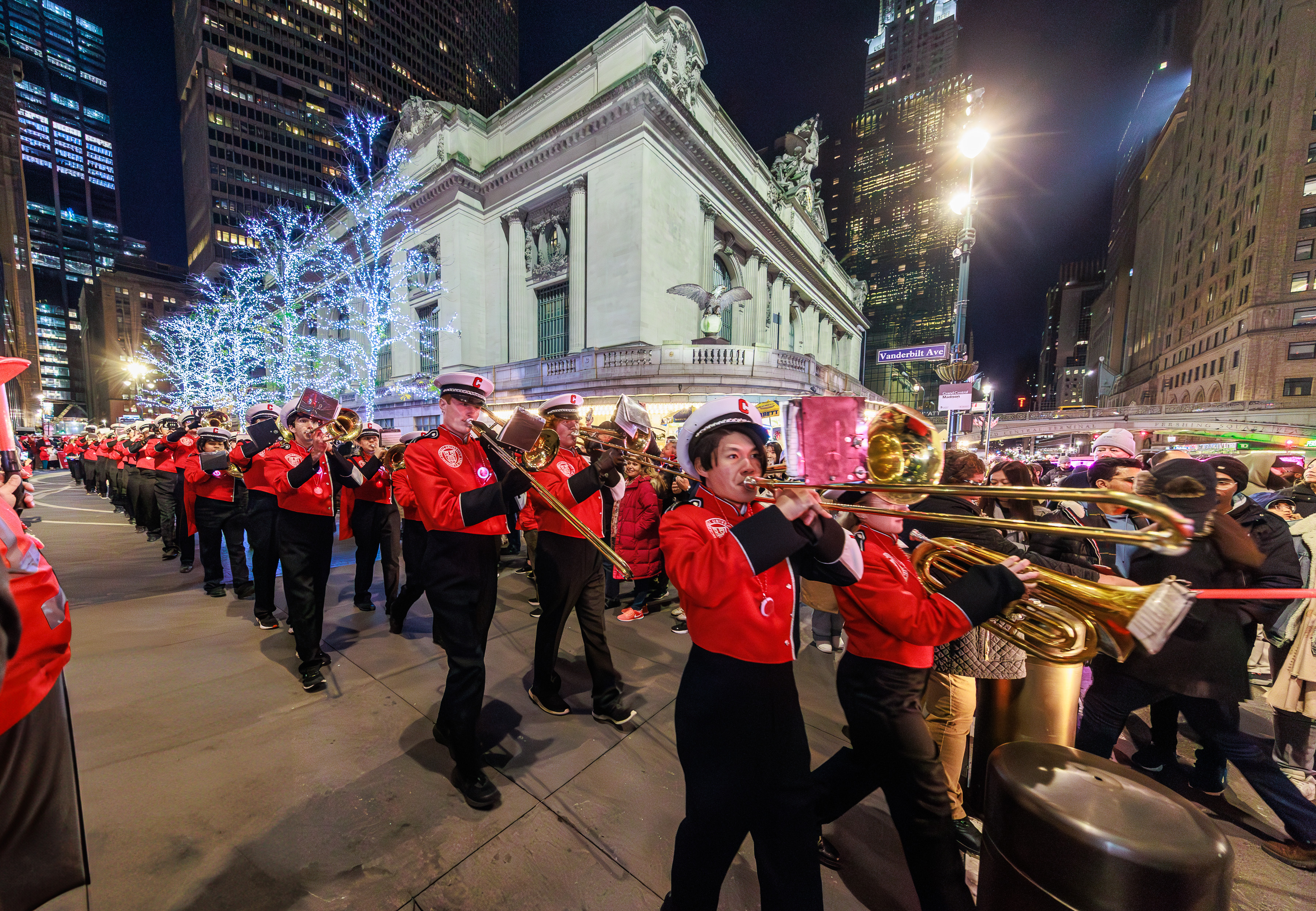
2024 Sy Katz Parade at Grand Central Terminal

The Sy Katz '31 Parade is a biennial march in New York City which takes place on dates when the Cornell football team travels to Columbia. After the game, the Marching Band leads Cornell alumni, family, and friends down a short stretch of Fifth Avenue, ending with a concert in front of the Cornell Club of New York at 6 East 44th Street. The tradition was started in 1972 by Seymour "Sy" Katz '31 and was the length of one city block. The 2016 parade was headed by Provost Michael Kotlikoff as grand marshal. The 2018 parade, led by Cornell president Martha E. Pollack, marched from Rockefeller Center to the Cornell Club, attended by some 1,000 Cornell alumni, family members and friends. After a COVID-induced hiatus, the Big Red Band returned to the Big Apple for the parade on November 19, 2022, with honorary grand marshals Bill Welker '73 and Brian Adelman '09.

== Pep Band ==
Big Red Pep Band

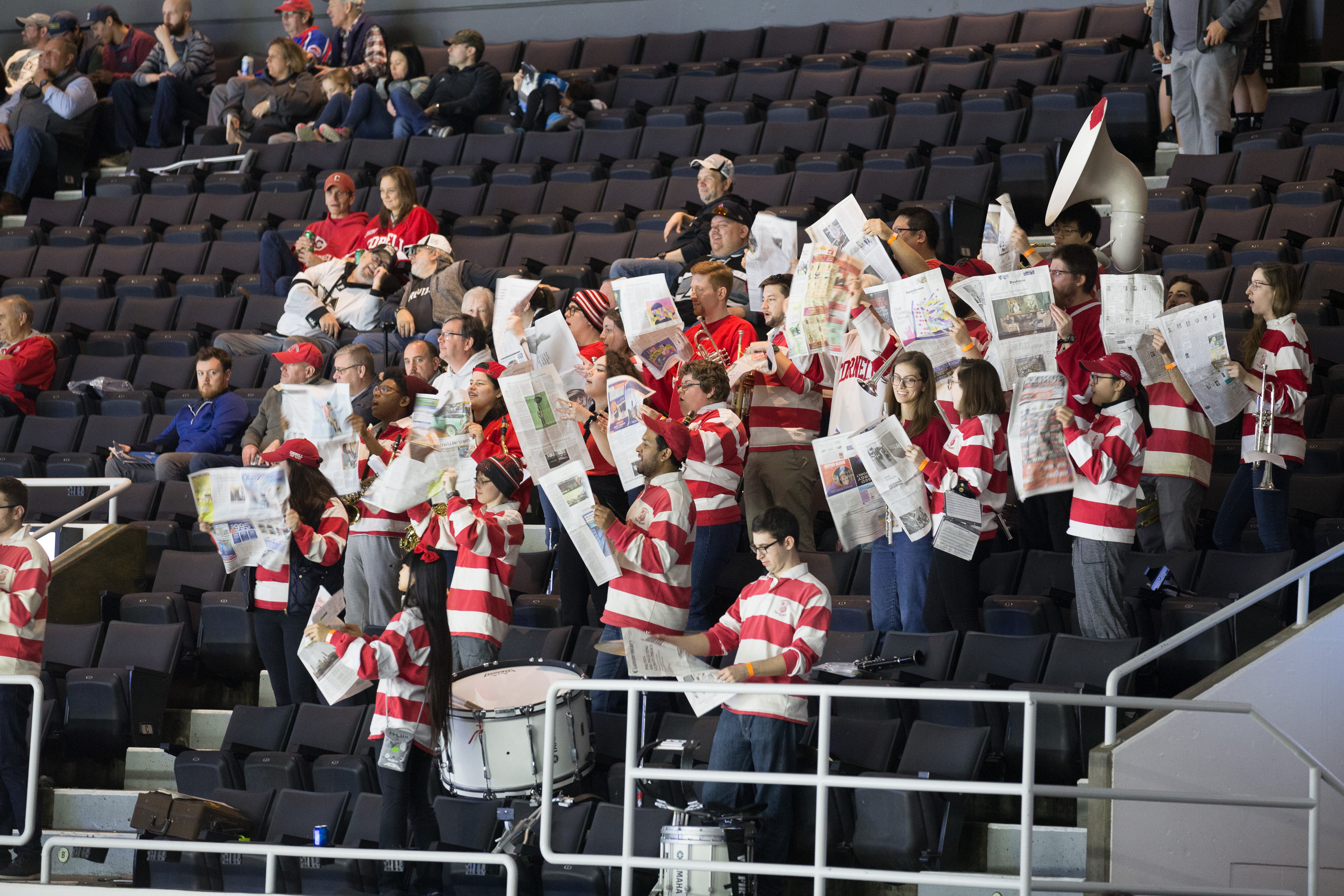
The Pep Band holds up newspapers while the opposing team is introduced

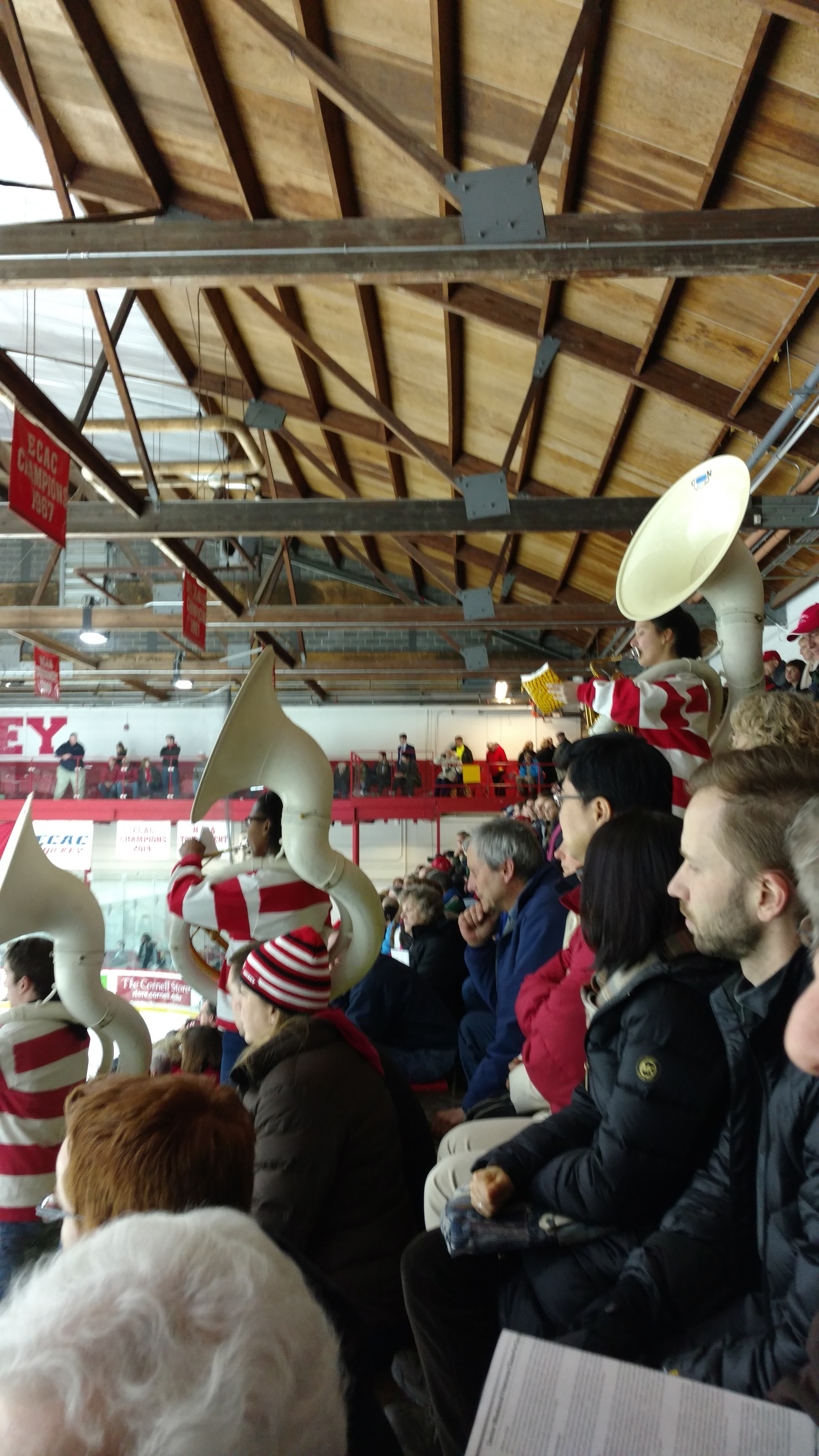
Sousaphones play Swanee River

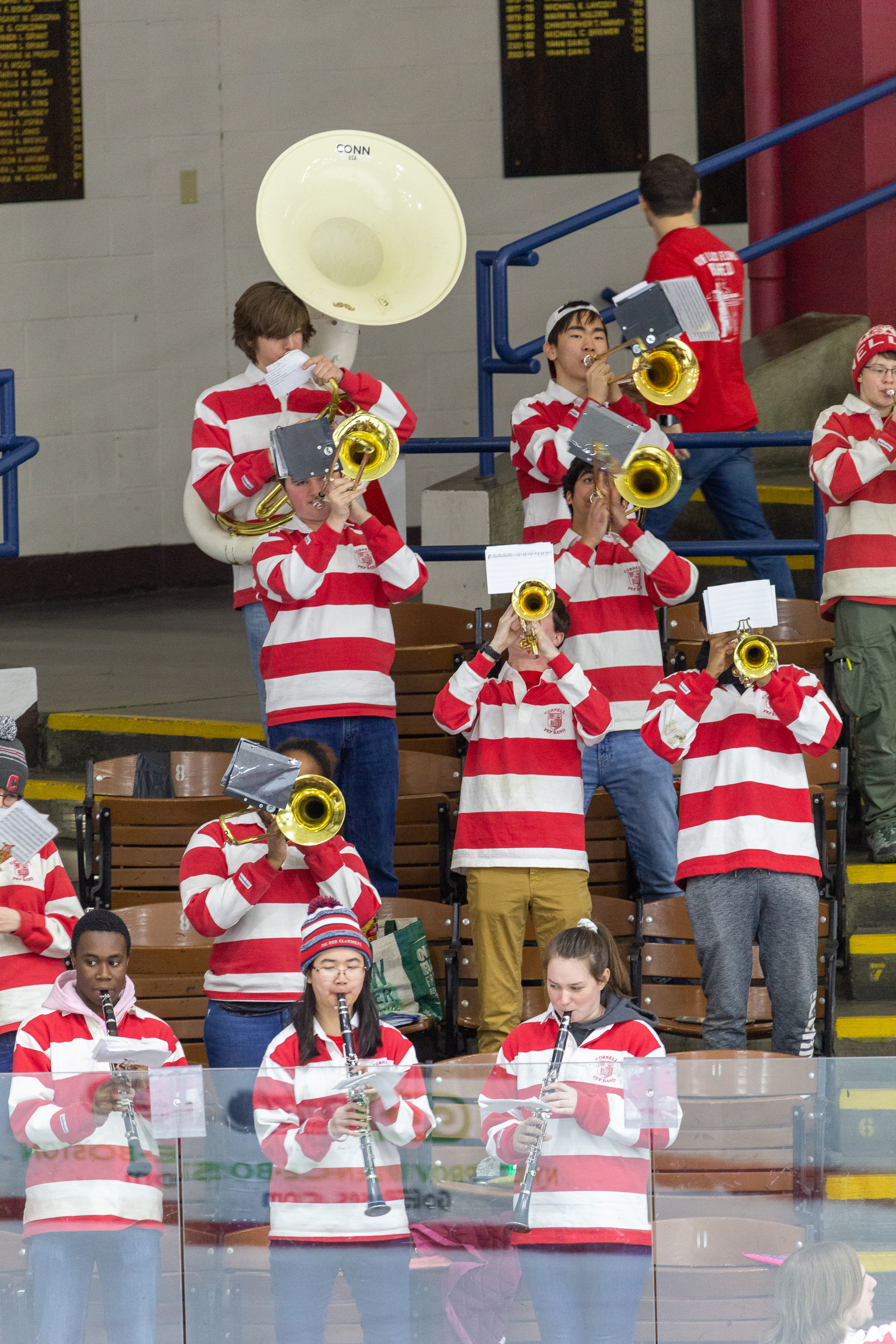
Pep band's red and white rugby shirts

The Cornell Big Red Pep Band is Cornell University's student-run pep band that performs primarily at Cornell Men's ice hockey, with frequent appearances at Women's ice hockey, Men's and Women's lacrosse and basketball, and occasional appearances at a diverse array of other events, such as wrestling, soccer, field hockey, building dedications, and other university events. Until 1986, the band was a subsidiary of the Cornell Big Red Marching Band, with the Marching Band's Drum Major serving as one of the two conductors, and the Pep Band's Head Manager was simply an elected member of the Marching Band's board. However, in November 1985, the Big Red Bands voted to make the Big Red Pep Band a separate organization in order for it to secure its own funding, have more independent direction, and cater to members who were not necessarily part of the Marching Band. However, there is still much overlap between the two organizations, with a majority of Pep Band members also being involved with the Marching Band, and the elected Pep Band Head Manager serving on the Marching Band's Board.

Beginning in the late nineties, the Pep Band began branching out from playing primarily for hockey games to play at the majority of home men's lacrosse games, numerous basketball games, along with other assorted events. Despite this, the band remains dedicated to hockey, appearing at all home games and a majority of away games.

=== Rehearsals and Performances ===
The band performs at sporting events most weekends, with many weekends in the Spring semester containing two or more events in a single day. If the band is scheduled to perform at two conflicting times, the pep band manager splits the group based upon instrumentation and priority points. Those attending less popular events (e.g. Women's basketball) are rewarded with more priority points than more popular ones (e.g. Men's Ice Hockey.) This gives new members of the band a chance to accumulate priority points quickly and helps assure good instrumentation at less popular events.

=== Board and Conductors ===
Every December, the Pep Band meets and elects the board for the next calendar year. The positions are:

- Manager: responsible for all the logistics for the band, including arranging for accommodations, travel, and tickets for away games, and generally being the band's public representative
- Treasurer: responsible for keeping records of band expenditures and formulating budgeting requests in association with the Big Red Bands Alumni Association (BRBAA) and the
- Librarian: makes sure copies of music are distributed to all members
- Secretary: publicizes Pep Band events and keeps minutes of all board meetings
- Historian: takes pictures and otherwise records or maintains information about the band for posterity
- Equipment Chair: works alongside the Big Red Marching Band equipment chair to maintain or order instruments for the band

In addition, 2 student conductors are elected at the end of each semester to serve for the next semester.

=== Instrumentation ===
The Pep Band is allocated 51 tickets for home hockey games, and travels with 25 to 41 members to away games. Typical instrumentation for a home hockey game might be as follows:

- 12 Trumpets
- 10 Trombones and Baritones
- 8 Saxophones
- 6 Flutes
- 4 Clarinets
- 2 Mellophones
- 5 Percussionists
- 3 Tubas
- 1 Conductor

However, instrumentation varies depending on availability of members and how many priority points members have accumulated by attending past performances and rehearsals. The Big Red Pep Band has been called one of the best pep bands in college hockey.

=== Music ===
The Pep Band has a large and diverse repertoire, much of which consists of custom arrangements done by members of the band. This allows the band to go multiple events before it is necessary to repeat songs, and have enough shorter pieces to perform during stoppages in play to last even triple overtime games without repeating.

The actual pieces are widely varied, from traditional Cornell songs such as "Give my Regards to Davy"(the official fight song), the Alma Mater "Far Above Cayuga's Waters", and "My Old Cornell", to more modern pieces, such as The Who's "Pinball Wizard", "Everybody's Everything", "Rock & Roll part 2", "España", "Paradise City", and "Gonna Fly Now".

The band also typically greets the Harvard University Men's Hockey Team (see Cornell-Harvard hockey rivalry) with the theme from 'Love Story', Michigan State University and Ohio State University with "The Victors," Colorado College with "DU, Rah!," Boston College with "The Notre Dame Victory March," Army with "Anchors Aweigh", University of Vermont with "Baby Elephant Walk" and University of Minnesota with "On, Wisconsin!."
