= Give My Regards to Davy =

Fight song of Cornell University

Tee Fee Crane and "Davy" in the 1910s

"Give My Regards to Davy" is Cornell University's primary fight song. The song's lyrics were written in 1905 by Cornell alumni Charles E. Tourison (1905), W. L. Umstad (1906), and Bill Forbes (1906), a trio of roommates at Beta Theta Pi, and set to the 1904 tune of George M. Cohan's "Give My Regards to Broadway".

The song refers to a fictional encounter between an anonymous student, David Fletcher "Davy" Hoy (for whom Hoy Field was named), the registrar and secretary for the committee on student conduct, and Thomas Frederick "Tee Fee" Crane, the Professor of Languages and the first Dean of the College of Arts and Sciences revolving around the student's expulsion for binge drinking. Hoy was known for his ferocity as a strict disciplinarian. Crane, on the other hand, was generally well liked among students. "Piker" is believed to be a historical slang term for a freshman, but it actually means a poor student or slacker.

Theodore Zinck's was a bar in downtown Ithaca that has since closed. Its legend still lives on in the weekly event for seniors "Zinck's Night", which is celebrated worldwide in October by Cornellians.

== Lyrics ==
The original and best known lyrics:

Give my regards to Davy,
Remember me to Tee Fee Crane.
Tell all the pikers on the Hill
That I'll be back again.
Tell them just how I busted
Lapping up the high highball.
We'll all have drinks at Theodore Zinck's
When I get back next fall!

== Parodies ==
In 1920, to reflect the changing diversions of students, The Cornell Daily Sun published a new version of the song under pen name of "Lord Helpus."

Give my regards to Gladys
Remember me to Maud and Jane
Tell all the tea-hounds on the Hill
That I'll be back again
Tell them just how I busted
Listening to the jazz band's call --
Oh! we'll all write a berry in the old Wisterie
When I get back next fall!

Sometime in the 1950s, another unofficial version appeared, referring to President Deane Malott's "Social Events Standards" that attempted to ban fraternity parties, to ban women from visiting men's off-campus apartments, and to maintain the strict curfews and sign-in/out times for women. This verse is only a modest form of outrage as compared to the protests that were staged. At one, students burned an effigy of Malott. Mobs formed, including one that marched to President Malott's house demanding his resignation and throwing eggs, rocks, and smoke bombs.

Give my regards to Ezra
Remember me to Andy White.
Tell all the virgins on the Hill
That I'll be back some night.
Tell them just how I licked it,
Lappin' up the brew at Jim's.
We'll all take shots at Deane Malott's
When I get back again!
