= Cornell–Harvard hockey rivalry =

Sports rivalry in men's ice hockey

- Cornell Big Red Harvard Crimson
- Sport: Ice hockey
- First meeting: January 8, 1910; Harvard 5–0
- Latest meeting: March 15, 2026; Cornell 5–2
- Next meeting: TBD

Statistics
- Total meetings: 173
- All-time series: Cornell, 87–72–14
- Largest victory: Harvard, 18–0 (1959)
- Longest win streak: Cornell: 13 (1966–1971); Harvard: 12 (1912–1962)
- Current win streak: Cornell: 2 (March 14, 2026–present)
- Current unbeaten streak: Cornell: 2-0-0 (March 14, 2026–present)

Locations of Cornell and Harvard

The Cornell–Harvard hockey rivalry is a men's ice hockey sports rivalry between the Big Red of Cornell University and Crimson of Harvard University dating back to 1910.

Cornell and Harvard play each other twice each regular season with games at Cornell's Lynah Rink in Ithaca, New York and Harvard's Bright-Landry Hockey Center in Allston, Massachusetts. The success of both programs ensures that postseason meetings are common. The rivals meet more than twice each season frequently. Cornell and Harvard have met 173 times on the ice including their first contest on January 8, 1910. Cornell leads the series 87–72-14 as of March 15, 2026.

== History ==
=== Early years ===
Students of academic institutions along the East Coast began forming collegiate hockey clubs around the turn of the 20th century. Yale was among the first institutions to create such a program. It was not long until Cornell and Harvard joined the ranks of their peer institutions in the East on the ice. Harvard took the ice in 1898 and lost to future Ivy-League foe Brown 6–0. Cornell earned a 3–0–0 record in 1901, winning contests against Penn, Princeton, and Swarthmore.

=== Developing hockey powers of the East ===
The paths of the program diverged after that point. Harvard became the dominant program in Eastern play, especially among the members who would come to constitute the Ivy League. Cornell and Harvard had played fourteen times in the span between January 1910 and February 1962. Harvard held a 13–1–0 record over Cornell until February 3, 1962.

Lynah Rink at Cornell had been completed in 1957. Its potential lay dormant, with Cornell hockey drawing 2,000–3,000 fans per game in the approximately 3,800-seat arena. That all changed when the end of the 1961–62 season of men's ice hockey approached.

Cornell entered February 1962 with a 7–4–0 record. Cornell believed it was on the verge of earning its first winning season since Cornell hockey moved indoors from Beebe Lake. Cornell fans began to place emphasis upon a key clash on February 3, 1962, the opponent: Harvard. Harvard had dominated the Ivy League since its inception in 1954, winning all but one of the Ivy-League championships in men's ice hockey until that point. Cornell was in contention to win the title and reclaim its former glory with a win over the Crimson.

The February 1962 game was charged with passion among the Cornell fans. Harvard and its fans approached the game with a level of apathy. The excitement at Cornell gave rise to "The Line" before the Cornell-Harvard game. The February 1962 game was an inflection point for Cornell hockey and The Line became a rite of passage for all those who wish to join the ranks of the Lynah Faithful, the loyal and fanatical fans of Cornell hockey. Lynah was beyond capacity with 4,500 spectators watching as Cornell upset Harvard 2–1.

=== "The Canadians" against the Crimson ===
Cornell seized the momentum of the upswing in its fortune and its brightest days were ahead of it. Cornell hired college hockey coach Ned Harkness from RPI in 1963. An RPI fan asked Harkness on the eve of his departure from Troy, New York, why Harkness was leaving RPI for Cornell. Harkness responded, "because, Ithaca is exactly 90 miles closer to the Canadian border than Troy."

Reliance upon Canadian talent to forge winning traditions at the institutions where Harkness coached created enmity between Cornell and other East Coast programs, especially Harvard. This added yet another level to the increasingly heated Cornell-Harvard clashes.

Harvard’s hockey program consistently recruited players from the United States. The team, known as the Crimson, focused on using American players for its roster. The program defined itself upon that principle. Harvardian tradition helped the United States claim its first gold medal in men's ice hockey at the 1960 Winter Olympics.The team's success involved four players from Harvard, including future Harvard head coach, Bill Cleary.

The recruiting practices of Harkness and traditions of Harvard placed the two programs on a collision course. This tension was exacerbated by Cornell's record of 15–2–0 against Harvard during his tenure from 1963–70. Harvard players, Harvard fans, and The Harvard Crimson appropriated the term "the Canadians" as a pejorative for the Big Red.

The Lynah Faithful embraced the attempted slight from the Crimson. Cornell celebrated the contributions of talented Canadians to their hockey program. As a manifestation of this pride in the Big Red's Canadian players, the Lynah Faithful began serenading their Canadian players with "O Canada" when Cornell played in a venue that played only "The Star-Spangled Banner". Even though Cornell has become more reliant upon American talent and Harvard has embraced recruitment of Canadian talent in recent years, this tradition of the Lynah Faithful continues today.

Harvard grew frustrated with its lack of success against Cornell in this era. Harvard, like many athletic directors in the Ivy League, began to emphasize that the Ivy League refuses to admit student-athletes who could not earn admission into each respective institution upon their own scholastic merits alone, and because Cornell's academic requirements were lower than those of Harvard, the Big Red's pool of eligible talent was much larger than that of Harvard. This added an academic element to the Cornell-Harvard rivalry that lingers today.

=== The Rivalry Grows Fowl and Fishy ===
Harvard continued to disparage Cornell for its lower academic standards. The argument continued much like it did during the Harkness era. Harvard mocked Cornell as being an academic institution of lower caliber than Harvard. Fans and coaches from Harvard alike pointed to New York State's College of Agriculture and Life Sciences at Cornell University as proof that Cornell and Harvard were not peer institutions and that the standards of the latter were far superior to those of the former. It did not take long for this criticism to find display on ice.

A Harvard fan threw a dead chicken at Cornell goalie Dave Elenbaas on January 6, 1973 during a Cornell-Harvard game at Harvard. The chicken was an unsubtle and insulting allusion to the College of Agriculture and Life Sciences at Cornell. The Lynah Faithful were not to be outdone. They had just over a month to plan their retaliation.

One member of the Lynah Faithful decided to throw dead fish on the ice when the Crimson braved Lynah Rink on February 17, 1973. Many spectators assumed the fish to be a reference to Boston's seafood industry. Harvard fans retaliated during the same game by tying a live chicken to Cornell's goalpost.

William Ruskin (Cornell '74) disagreed with this interpretation of events. He stated in 2006 that after hearing about Harvard's original 1973 chicken prank, he and his friends decided to get revenge, and started planning. "Contrary to what was in The New York Times this week, there was no intention at the time to have any symbolism of the New England fishing industry. We merely wanted to put something disgusting in their net...getting a big smelly fish seemed like the best thing we could do." The tradition continued in February 1977 at Lynah when members of the Lynah Faithful tied a chicken to the Harvard goalpost between the second and third periods. The chicken was placed there by the late Bill "Wiffy" Silvia, a member of the class of 1978, Phi Sigma Kappa at Cornell, and a proud Big Red fan. Silvia said that placing the chicken was one of the proudest moments of his Cornell undergraduate years. Silvia had assistance in getting the chicken into Lynah Rink from the Big Red Bear at the time, the late Ron Winarick.

The tradition has taken a more standardized form since the 1970s. The Lynah Faithful deluge the Crimson with fish when the Harvard team takes the ice at Lynah Rink. Harvard fans throw dead chickens at Cornell when the fans rediscover periodically the Harvard tradition of doing so. Harvard fans rediscovered this tradition before and acted accordingly during the Cornell-Harvard game at Bright on November 11, 2011.

The rivalry became exceedingly charged and chants of "Harvard sucks" became common at Lynah Rink and during postseason clashes between the foes. Future Cornell hockey head coach Mike Schafer (Cornell '86) skated to center ice during roster announcements before the Cornell-Harvard contest at Lynah on December 10, 1983. He carried with him a hockey stick with "Harvard Sucks" written on it. He proceeded to break it over his head to the raucous applause and acclaim of the Lynah Faithful. The Cornell-Harvard rivalry had solidified its status as a true sporting spectacle.

=== Leave It On The Ice ===
The air of begrudging respect in the Cornell-Harvard rivalry gave way to sheer animosity in an incident in 1990. Harvard entered the 1989–90 season as the defending NCAA national champion. Harvard head coach Bill Cleary of 1960 Team USA Olympic fame had announced prior to the season that it would be the last season of his career as a college hockey coach at Harvard.

The season did not go as hoped for Harvard. The Crimson wanted to send off their head coach on a high note. Harvard earned only a 13–14–1 record and placed sixth in seeding for the ECAC Tournament.

Harvard breathed a sigh of relief when it realized that it would play Cornell in the ECAC Tournament. Harvard had an active 11-game winning streak against the Big Red heading into the competition. The elation and relief was well-published before the meeting with Cornell in that postseason. Cornell controlled play during the three-game series and swept Harvard with victories of 6–2 and 4–2.

Traditionally, college hockey teams shake hands at the end of a series with an opponent. The end of this game was the last game of Cleary's coaching career. It was an unceremonious and disappointing end that the Big Red forced him to endure. Cleary instructed his team to leave the ice without shaking the hands of the Cornell team.

Harvard celebrated the contributions of Cleary to the Harvard hockey program and USA Hockey with the retirement of the number 4 that he wore while he was a player at Harvard. The rafters of Bright are adorned with a retired number 4 banner to commemorate his contributions to the program. The ECAC named the trophy awarded to the winner of the regular-season title in Cleary's honor in 2002. The Cleary Cup is awarded to the team each season that earns the best regular-season, intraconference record in the ECAC.

While Harvard lauds the legacy of Cleary to Harvard and USA Hockey, Cornell remembers his last official act as coach with his instruction that his players were to leave the ice without congratulating Cornell. Cornell demonstrates its remembrance of that act each time that Cornell wins the Cleary Cup. Cornell leaves the Cup on the ice and the players refuse to touch it. Cornell continued this tradition the last time that it won the regular-season title in 2005.

=== Today ===
Former Cornell head coach Mike Schafer emphasized how important the rivalry was to the hockey cultures of both programs when he listed defeating the Crimson as one of his three goals for his first season in 1995–96. Harvard was unbeaten in the last 20 regular-season games against the Big Red at that time. Cornell went on to defeat Harvard in three games that season with a 5–3 win at Lynah, 5–4 win at Bright, and a 2–1 win at Lake Placid in the ECAC Championship Final. This change of fate reinvigorated the rivalry to the level of passion it enjoys in the present era.

The rivalry has grown into a wholly reciprocated event between the student bodies of Cornell and Harvard. Cornell is abuzz the week before any contest against Harvard. Harvard has declared that Cornell has surpassed Yale as its primary rival. An article from The Harvard Crimson in 2010 stated emphatically that, "[f]or though Harvard-Yale weekend is historic in its own right, the Bulldogs can no longer be considered the Crimson's most hated foe." The rivalry has been characterized as being "as big and as boisterous as a Michigan-Ohio State football contest."

The taunts between the fan bases have grown and adapted in the modern era of the rivalry. The unison chant of "Harvard sucks" is ubiquitous at games between the rivals. However, the repertoire of both fanbases has expanded in recent years. The Lynah Faithful and Harvard fans are heard often exchanging the taunt of "safety school". Harvard fans rationalize this because the acceptance rate at Harvard College is usually less than half the university-wide acceptance rate at Cornell. The Lynah Faithful reason that they can call Harvard a "safety school" because Harvard may be the Ivy-League institution into which it is hardest to gain admission, but it is among the easiest to "get out of" with its lax grading policies. These exchanges highlight a common feature of taunts during the Cornell-Harvard rivalry in recent years that involve references to grade inflation and admissions standards. Cornell is among the most grade deflationary institutions in the United States. Grading practices at Harvard have been cited as examples of grade inflation. The Lynah Faithful have capitalized upon these findings and incorporated them in their taunts of the Crimson with cheers of "grade inflation" and "Give me an A, give me another A, give me another A, give me another A, welcome to Harvard."

The Cornell-Harvard rivalry has become a contest between two academic institutions and hockey programs that have grown to respect, albeit begrudgingly, the history and accomplishments of each other. The combination of passion, taunting, and respect has led many sports commentators to consider the Cornell-Harvard rivalry as one of the best in sports.

== Lynah East ==
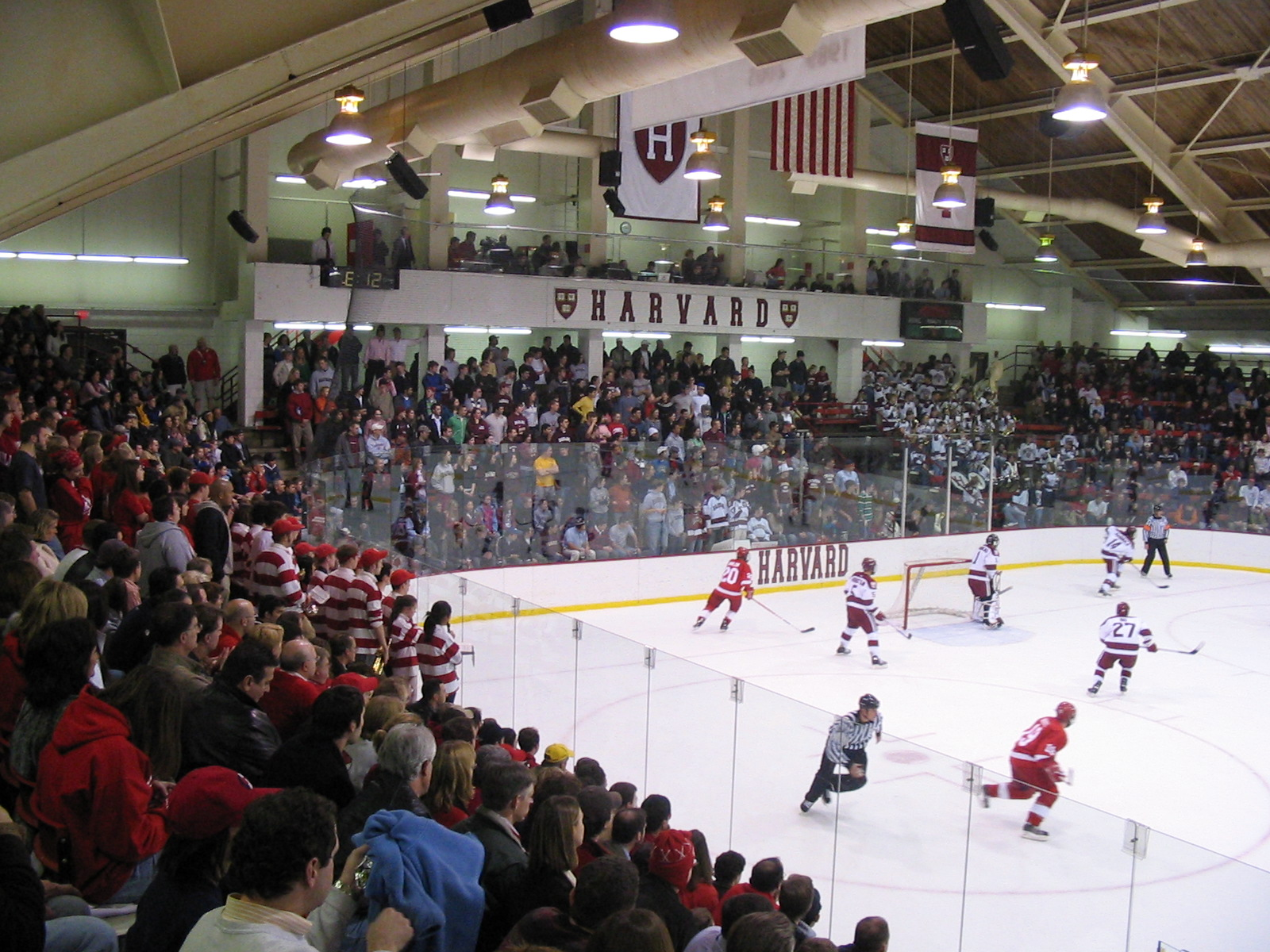
Fans from both Cornell and Harvard fill Bright Hockey Center, also referred to as Lynah East, during a Cornell-Harvard game in 2005.

The relatively large numbers of the Lynah Faithful who travel to away games have caused contests at Bright to be played in front of predominantly pro-Cornell crowds sometimes. The willingness of the Lynah Faithful to travel to away games at Bright in particular has led many in the Cornell community to think of Cornell-at-Harvard games as de facto home games for Cornell, and earned Bright, and by extension the Cornell-Harvard game played there, the nickname of Lynah East.

== Relevance of the Rivalry ==
Cornell and Harvard are the most successful current members of ECAC Hockey. Cornell leads the conference with the greatest number of ECAC Championships with 14 while Harvard is second with 11 championships. Harvard and Cornell are tied for the most regular-season conference titles with 11 each. Cornell and Harvard have met seven times in the ECAC Championship Final. This makes it the most common pairing of opponents in the championship game. Cornell has won four of those contests. Harvard won the most recent in 2017. The two programs account for 40% of all ECAC Championships won and 35% of all regular-season titles. Additionally, since the formal creation of the Ivy League in 1956, Cornell has won the greatest number of Ivy-League titles in men's ice hockey with 27 while Harvard has won 24.

Post season game results:

Season	Round	Site	Score	Winner
1969	ECAC Final	Boston, MA	4–2	Cornell
1970	ECAC Semifinal	Boston, MA	6–5	Cornell
1975	ECAC Semifinal	Boston, MA	6–4	Harvard
1976	ECAC Semifinal	Boston, MA	7–6	Cornell
1989	ECAC Semifinal	Boston, MA	6–3	Harvard
1990	ECAC Quarterfinal	Ithaca, NY	6–2, 4–2	Cornell sweep
1994	ECAC Quarterfinal	Allston, MA	5–4, 5–3	Harvard sweep
1996	ECAC Final	Lake Placid, NY	2–1	Cornell
1997	ECAC Quarterfinal	Ithaca, NY	2–2 OT, 4–1	Cornell
2000	ECAC Quarterfinal	Ithaca, NY	4–3, 4–3	Cornell sweep
2001	ECAC Semifinal	Lake Placid, NY	5–2	Cornell
2002	ECAC Final	Lake Placid, NY	4–3 2OT	Harvard
2003	ECAC Final	Albany, NY	3–2 OT	Cornell
2005	ECAC Final	Albany, NY	3–1	Cornell
2006	ECAC Final	Albany, NY	6–2	Harvard
2008	ECAC Semifinal	Albany, NY	3–1	Harvard
2010	ECAC Quarterfinal	Ithaca, NY	5–1, 3–0	Cornell sweep
2012	ECAC Semifinal	Atlantic City, NJ	6–1	Harvard
2017	ECAC Final	Lake Placid, NY	4–1	Harvard
2023	ECAC Semifinal	Lake Placid, NY	1–0 OT	Harvard
2024	ECAC Quarterfinal	Ithaca, NY	4–3, 4–1	Cornell sweep
2026	ECAC Quarterfinal	Ithaca, NY	1–3, 4–0, 5-2	Cornell

== Cornell-Harvard Rivalry in Film ==
=== Love Story ===
The Cornell-Harvard game is prominent in the first half of both the novel and film adaptations of Love Story. The protagonist of both is Oliver Barrett. Barrett is a student at Harvard College and member of the Crimson hockey team. Harvard loses the game against Cornell in the plot of both works. The Cornell Big Red Pep Band plays the theme from Love Story when Harvard takes the ice before the first two periods of every Cornell-Harvard clash in commemoration of Cornell's victory in this fictional game.

The film was shot on site at Harvard and depicts Cornell's campus but the Ithaca scenes were shot at Hamilton College in Clinton, NY.

Erich Segal, the author and screenwriter of Love Story, was a Harvard alumnus. The centrality that Segal gave the Cornell-Harvard game in his work demonstrated that he believed the rivalry to be of great significance to both universities.

== Game results ==
Full game results for the rivalry, with rankings beginning in the 1998–99 season.

Cornell victories	Harvard victories	Tie games

No.	Date	Location	Winning team		Losing team		Notes
1	January 8, 1910	St. Nicholas Rink; New York, NY	Harvard	5	Cornell	0	
2	January 28, 1911	Boston Arena; Boston, MA	Cornell	3	Harvard	2	
3	January 27, 1912	Boston Arena; Boston, MA	Harvard	3	Cornell	2	
4	January 18, 1913	Boston Arena; Boston, MA	Harvard	8	Cornell	2	
5	January 9, 1915	Boston Arena; Boston, MA	Harvard	8	Cornell	1	
6	January 11, 1916	Boston Arena; Boston, MA	Harvard	2	Cornell	0	
7	February 17, 1923	Boston Arena; Boston, MA	Harvard	6	Cornell	0	
8	January 10, 1959	Donald C. Watson Rink; Allston, MA	Harvard	18	Cornell	0	
9	February 23, 1959	Lynah Rink; Ithaca, NY	Harvard	13	Cornell	0	
10	January 9, 1960	Donald C. Watson Rink; Allston, MA	Harvard	9	Cornell	0	
11	February 22, 1960	Lynah Rink; Ithaca, NY	Harvard	12	Cornell	2	
12	January 6, 1961	Lynah Rink; Ithaca, NY	Harvard	3	Cornell	1	
13	February 4, 1961	Donald C. Watson Rink; Allston, MA	Harvard	2	Cornell	1	
14	January 6, 1962	Donald C. Watson Rink; Allston, MA	Harvard	5	Cornell	1	
15	February 3, 1962	Lynah Rink; Ithaca, NY	Cornell	2	Harvard	1	
16	January 5, 1963	Donald C. Watson Rink; Allston, MA	Harvard	8	Cornell	1	
17	February 2, 1963	Lynah Rink; Ithaca, NY	Harvard	5	Cornell	1	
18	January 11, 1964	Lynah Rink; Ithaca, NY	Harvard	4	Cornell	3	
19	February 5, 1964	Donald C. Watson Rink; Allston, MA	Cornell	2	Harvard	1	
20	January 16, 1965	Donald C. Watson Rink; Allston, MA	Cornell	3	Harvard	2	
21	February 17, 1965	Lynah Rink; Ithaca, NY	Cornell	9	Harvard	2	
22	January 15, 1966	Lynah Rink; Ithaca, NY	Cornell	7	Harvard	6	
23	February 19, 1966	Donald C. Watson Rink; Allston, MA	Harvard	5	Cornell	4	(OT)
24	December 20, 1966	Lynah Rink; Ithaca, NY	Cornell	4	Harvard	3	
25	December 29, 1966	Boston Arena; Boston, MA	Cornell	4	Harvard	1	Boston Arena Christmas Tournament Semifinal
26	February 22, 1967	Donald C. Watson Rink; Allston, MA	Cornell	4	Harvard	1	
27	December 18, 1967	Donald C. Watson Rink; Allston, MA	Cornell	9	Harvard	0	
28	February 28, 1968	Lynah Rink; Ithaca, NY	Cornell	7	Harvard	2	
29	January 11, 1969	Lynah Rink; Ithaca, NY	Cornell	8	Harvard	4	
30	February 27, 1969	Donald C. Watson Rink; Allston, MA	Cornell	6	Harvard	3	
31	March 8, 1969	Boston Garden; Boston, MA	Cornell	4	Harvard	2	ECAC Championship
32	January 10, 1970	Donald C. Watson Rink; Allston, MA	Cornell	3	Harvard	1	
33	February 25, 1970	Lynah Rink; Ithaca, NY	Cornell	9	Harvard	3	
34	March 13, 1970	Boston Garden; Boston, MA	Cornell	6	Harvard	5	ECAC Semifinal
35	January 9, 1971	Lynah Rink; Ithaca, NY	Cornell	5	Harvard	4	(OT)
36	March 3, 1971	Donald C. Watson Rink; Allston, MA	Cornell	3	Harvard	1	
37	January 8, 1972	Donald C. Watson Rink; Allston, MA	Harvard	6	Cornell	4	
38	February 21, 1972	Lynah Rink; Ithaca, NY	Cornell	5	Harvard	2	
39	January 6, 1973	Donald C. Watson Rink; Allston, MA	Cornell	5	Harvard	2	
40	February 17, 1973	Lynah Rink; Ithaca, NY	Cornell	9	Harvard	4	
41	January 16, 1974	Donald C. Watson Rink; Allston, MA	Cornell	5	Harvard	4	(OT)
42	February 16, 1974	Lynah Rink; Ithaca, NY	Harvard	7	Cornell	4	
43	January 10, 1975	Donald C. Watson Rink; Allston, MA	Harvard	4	Cornell	2	
44	February 19, 1975	Lynah Rink; Ithaca, NY	Harvard	8	Cornell	2	
45	March 7, 1975	Boston Garden; Boston, MA	Harvard	6	Cornell	4	ECAC Semifinal
46	February 11, 1976	Lynah Rink; Ithaca, NY	Cornell	8	Harvard	4	
47	February 25, 1976	Donald C. Watson Rink; Allston, MA	Tie	3	Tie	3	(OT)
48	March 13, 1976	Boston Garden; Boston, MA	Cornell	7	Harvard	6	ECAC consolation game
49	February 9, 1977	Donald C. Watson Rink; Allston, MA	Cornell	7	Harvard	4	
50	February 23, 1977	Lynah Rink; Ithaca, NY	Cornell	6	Harvard	2	
51	February 21, 1978	Lynah Rink; Ithaca, NY	Cornell	6	Harvard	3	
52	February 23, 1978	Donald C. Watson Rink; Allston, MA	Cornell	4	Harvard	3	(OT)
53	February 7, 1979	Bright-Landry Hockey Center; Allston, MA	Cornell	4	Harvard	2	
54	February 21, 1979	Lynah Rink; Ithaca, NY	Cornell	11	Harvard	3	
55	February 8, 1980	Bright-Landry Hockey Center; Allston, MA	Harvard	5	Cornell	3	
56	February 29, 1980	Lynah Rink; Ithaca, NY	Cornell	6	Harvard	1	
57	January 9, 1981	Bright-Landry Hockey Center; Allston, MA	Cornell	8	Harvard	5	
58	February 28, 1981	Lynah Rink; Ithaca, NY	Cornell	7	Harvard	3	
59	February 12, 1982	Lynah Rink; Ithaca, NY	Harvard	5	Cornell	4	(OT)
60	February 27, 1982	Bright-Landry Hockey Center; Allston, MA	Harvard	7	Cornell	0	
61	December 12, 1982	Lynah Rink; Ithaca, NY	Cornell	3	Harvard	1	
62	February 12, 1983	Bright-Landry Hockey Center; Allston, MA	Harvard	3	Cornell	2	(OT)
63	December 10, 1983	Lynah Rink; Ithaca, NY	Cornell	6	Harvard	5	
64	February 24, 1984	Bright-Landry Hockey Center; Allston, MA	Cornell	4	Harvard	3	
65	December 8, 1984	Lynah Rink; Ithaca, NY	Tie	5	Tie	5	(OT)
66	February 16, 1985	Bright-Landry Hockey Center; Allston, MA	Cornell	5	Harvard	4	(OT)
67	December 8, 1985	Lynah Rink; Ithaca, NY	Harvard	11	Cornell	3	
68	February 14, 1986	Bright-Landry Hockey Center; Allston, MA	Harvard	4	Cornell	3	(OT)
69	December 7, 1986	Lynah Rink; Ithaca, NY	Harvard	6	Cornell	3	
70	February 14, 1987	Bright-Landry Hockey Center; Allston, MA	Harvard	3	Cornell	0	
71	December 4, 1987	Lynah Rink; Ithaca, NY	Harvard	3	Cornell	1	
72	February 13, 1988	Bright-Landry Hockey Center; Allston, MA	Harvard	3	Cornell	1	
73	December 4, 1988	Lynah Rink; Ithaca, NY	Harvard	9	Cornell	1	
74	February 10, 1989	Bright-Landry Hockey Center; Allston, MA	Harvard	4	Cornell	2	
75	March 11, 1989	Boston Garden; Boston, MA	Harvard	6	Cornell	3	ECAC third place game
76	December 3, 1989	Lynah Rink; Ithaca, NY	Harvard	5	Cornell	0	
77	February 9, 1990	Bright-Landry Hockey Center; Allston, MA	Harvard	5	Cornell	2	
78	March 2, 1990	Lynah Rink; Ithaca, NY	Cornell	6	Harvard	2	ECAC Quarterfinal game 1
79	March 3, 1990	Lynah Rink; Ithaca, NY	Cornell	4	Harvard	2	ECAC quarterfinal game 2
80	November 30, 1990	Bright-Landry Hockey Center; Allston, MA	Harvard	8	Cornell	3	
81	February 9, 1991	Lynah Rink; Ithaca, NY	Tie	2	Tie	2	(OT)
82	December 8, 1991	Lynah Rink; Ithaca, NY	Tie	2	Tie	2	(OT)
83	February 14, 1992	Bright-Landry Hockey Center; Allston, MA	Tie	2	Tie	2	(OT)
84	December 5, 1992	Bright-Landry Hockey Center; Allston, MA	Harvard	6	Cornell	1	
85	February 19, 1993	Lynah Rink; Ithaca, NY	Harvard	6	Cornell	3	
86	November 19, 1993	Lynah Rink; Ithaca, NY	Harvard	5	Cornell	4	
87	February 12, 1994	Bright-Landry Hockey Center; Allston, MA	Harvard	4	Cornell	0	
88	March 11, 1994	Bright-Landry Hockey Center; Allston, MA	Harvard	5	Cornell	4	ECAC Quarterfinal game 1
89	March 12, 1994	Bright-Landry Hockey Center; Allston, MA	Harvard	5	Cornell	3	ECAC quarterfinal game 2
90	November 18, 1994	Lynah Rink; Ithaca, NY	Harvard	4	Cornell	2	
91	February 10, 1995	Bright-Landry Hockey Center; Allston, MA	Harvard	2	Cornell	1	
92	November 11, 1995	Lynah Rink; Ithaca, NY	Cornell	5	Harvard	3	
93	February 10, 1996	Bright-Landry Hockey Center; Allston, MA	Cornell	5	Harvard	4	
94	March 16, 1996	Olympic Arena; Lake Placid, NY	Cornell	2	Harvard	1	ECAC Championship
95	November 9, 1996	Bright-Landry Hockey Center; Allston, MA	Cornell	3	Harvard	2	
96	February 14, 1997	Lynah Rink; Ithaca, NY	Cornell	2	Harvard	1	
97	March 7, 1997	Lynah Rink; Ithaca, NY	Tie	2	Tie	2	(OT), ECAC Quarterfinal game 1
98	March 8, 1997	Lynah Rink; Ithaca, NY	Cornell	4	Harvard	1	ECAC quarterfinal game 2
99	November 7, 1997	Lynah Rink; Ithaca, NY	Cornell	5	Harvard	2	
100	February 21, 1998	Bright-Landry Hockey Center; Allston, MA	Cornell	3	Harvard	2	
101	November 13, 1998	Bright-Landry Hockey Center; Allston, MA	Cornell	7	Harvard	2	
102	February 20, 1999	Lynah Rink; Ithaca, NY	Harvard	5	Cornell	3	
103	November 13, 1999	Lynah Rink; Ithaca, NY	Harvard	2	Cornell	1	
104	February 4, 2000	Bright-Landry Hockey Center; Allston, MA	Cornell	6	Harvard	2	
105	March 10, 2000	Lynah Rink; Ithaca, NY	Cornell	4	Harvard	3	ECAC first round game 1
106	March 11, 2000	Lynah Rink; Ithaca, NY	Cornell	4	Harvard	3	ECAC first round game 2
107	November 17, 2000	Lynah Rink; Ithaca, NY	Tie	1	Tie	1	(OT)
108	February 3, 2001	Bright-Landry Hockey Center; Allston, MA	No. 13 Cornell	2	Harvard	1	
109	March 16, 2001	Olympic Arena; Lake Placid, NY	Cornell	5	Harvard	2	ECAC Semifinal
110	November 16, 2001	Bright-Landry Hockey Center; Allston, MA	Harvard	4	No. 11 Cornell	3	(OT)
111	February 1, 2002	Lynah Rink; Ithaca, NY	No. 11 Cornell	6	Harvard	3	
112	March 16, 2002	Olympic Arena; Lake Placid, NY	Harvard	4	No. 8 Cornell	3	(2OT), ECAC Championship
113	November 22, 2002	Lynah Rink; Ithaca, NY	No. 8 Cornell	5	No. 15 Harvard	2	
114	February 15, 2003	Bright-Landry Hockey Center; Allston, MA	No. 3 Cornell	4	No. 13 Harvard	3	
115	March 22, 2003	Pepsi Arena; Albany, NY	No. 2 Cornell	3	No. 12 Harvard	2	(OT), ECAC Championship
116	December 6, 2003	Lynah Rink; Ithaca, NY	Cornell	1	Harvard	0	
117	January 9, 2004	Bright-Landry Hockey Center; Allston, MA	No. 9 Cornell	5	Harvard	3	
118	November 5, 2004	Lynah Rink; Ithaca, NY	No. 12 Cornell	2	Harvard	0	
119	January 8, 2005	Bright-Landry Hockey Center; Allston, MA	No. 12 Harvard	1	No. 9 Cornell	0	
120	March 19, 2005	Pepsi Arena; Albany, NY	No. 3 Cornell	3	No. 8 Harvard	1	ECAC Championship
121	November 11, 2005	Bright-Landry Hockey Center; Allston, MA	No. 3 Cornell	4	Harvard	3	
122	February 18, 2006	Lynah Rink; Ithaca, NY	No. 18 Harvard	4	No. 6 Cornell	3	
123	March 18, 2006	Pepsi Arena; Albany, NY	No. 12 Harvard	6	No. 7 Cornell	2	ECAC Championship
124	November 10, 2006	Lynah Rink; Ithaca, NY	No. 11 Cornell	3	Harvard	2	
125	February 24, 2007	Bright-Landry Hockey Center; Allston, MA	Harvard	3	No. 16 Cornell	1	
126	November 16, 2007	Bright-Landry Hockey Center; Allston, MA	No. 19 Harvard	2	Cornell	1	
127	March 1, 2008	Lynah Rink; Ithaca, NY	No. 20 Harvard	3	Cornell	1	
128	March 21, 2008	Pepsi Arena; Albany, NY	No. 16 Harvard	3	No. 20 Cornell	1	ECAC Semifinal
129	November 21, 2008	Lynah Rink; Ithaca, NY	No. 14 Cornell	2	No. 18 Harvard	1	
130	February 14, 2009	Bright-Landry Hockey Center; Allston, MA	Harvard	4	No. 6 Cornell	2	
131	November 7, 2009	Lynah Rink; Ithaca, NY	No. 5 Cornell	6	Harvard	3	
132	February 19, 2010	Bright-Landry Hockey Center; Allston, MA	No. 10 Cornell	3	Harvard	0	
133	March 12, 2010	Lynah Rink; Ithaca, NY	No. 9 Cornell	5	Harvard	1	ECAC Quarterfinal Game 1
134	March 13, 2010	Lynah Rink; Ithaca, NY	No. 9 Cornell	3	Harvard	0	ECAC Quarterfinal Game 2
135	January 29, 2011	Bright-Landry Hockey Center; Allston, MA	Cornell	2	Harvard	1	
136	February 18, 2011	Lynah Rink; Ithaca, NY	Harvard	4	Cornell	3	
137	November 11, 2011	Bright-Landry Hockey Center; Allston, MA	Cornell	4	Harvard	2	
138	January 21, 2012	Lynah Rink; Ithaca, NY	Tie	2	Tie	2	(OT)
139	March 16, 2012	Boardwalk Hall; Atlantic City, NJ	No. 19 Harvard	6	No. 13 Cornell	1	ECAC Semifinal
140	November 16, 2012	Lynah Rink; Ithaca, NY	No. 17 Harvard	4	No. 10 Cornell	1	
141	February 16, 2013	Bright-Landry Hockey Center; Allston, MA	Tie	2	Tie	2	(OT)
142	January 17, 2014	Bright-Landry Hockey Center; Allston, MA	No. 12 Cornell	3	Harvard	2	
143	March 1, 2014	Lynah Rink; Ithaca, NY	No. 11 Cornell	3	Harvard	2	(OT)
144	January 23, 2015	Lynah Rink; Ithaca, NY	Cornell	3	No. 4 Harvard	2	
145	February 14, 2015	Bright-Landry Hockey Center; Allston, MA	Tie	2	Tie	2	(OT)
146	January 23, 2016	Lynah Rink; Ithaca, NY	No. 9 Harvard	6	No. 10 Cornell	2	
147	February 19, 2016	Bright-Landry Hockey Center; Allston, MA	Tie	2	Tie	2	(OT)
148	November 5, 2016	Bright-Landry Hockey Center; Allston, MA	No. 12 Harvard	4	Cornell	3	
149	January 27, 2017	Lynah Rink; Ithaca, NY	No. 9 Harvard	4	No. 14 Cornell	1	
150	March 18, 2017	Herb Brooks Arena; Lake Placid, NY	No. 2 Harvard	4	No. 9 Cornell	1	ECAC Championship
151	November 11, 2017	Lynah Rink; Ithaca, NY	No. 14 Cornell	3	No. 5 Harvard	2	
152	January 26, 2018	Bright-Landry Hockey Center; Allston, MA	No. 2 Cornell	3	Harvard	0	
153	November 24, 2018	Madison Square Garden; New York, NY	Harvard	4	No. 15 Cornell	1	
154	December 1, 2018	Bright-Landry Hockey Center; Allston, MA	No. 16 Cornell	2	Harvard	1	
155	January 18, 2019	Lynah Rink; Ithaca, NY	No. 15 Cornell	2	Harvard	0	
156	December 6, 2019	Bright-Landry Hockey Center; Allston, MA	No. 2 Cornell	3	Harvard	1	
157	January 25, 2020	Lynah Rink; Ithaca, NY	Tie	1	Tie	1	(OT)
158	November 5, 2021	Bright-Landry Hockey Center; Allston, MA	No. 13 Harvard	3	No. 15 Cornell	2	
159	January 29, 2022	Lynah Rink; Ithaca, NY	Tie	2	Tie	2	(OT)
160	December 2, 2022	Lynah Rink; Ithaca, NY	No. 7 Harvard	2	Cornell	1	
161	January 28, 2023	Bright-Landry Hockey Center; Allston, MA	No. 10 Harvard	6	No. 11 Cornell	2	
162	March 17, 2023	Herb Brooks Arena; Lake Placid, NY	No. 6 Harvard	1	No. 10 Cornell	0	(OT), ECAC Semifinal
163	December 11, 2023	Lynah Rink; Ithaca, NY	Harvard	3	No. 7 Cornell	2	
164	January 26, 2024	Bright-Landry Hockey Center; Allston, MA	No. 13 Cornell	2	Harvard	0	
165	March 15, 2024	Lynah Rink; Ithaca, NY	Cornell	4	Harvard	3	ECAC Quarterfinal Game 1
166	March 16, 2024	Lynah Rink; Ithaca, NY	Cornell	4	Harvard	1	ECAC Quarterfinal Game 2
167	November 16, 2024	Bright-Landry Hockey Center; Allston, MA	Tie	2	Tie	2	(SOW Cornell 2-0)
168	January 24, 2025	Lynah Rink; Ithaca, NY	Cornell	4	Harvard	1	
169	November 7, 2025	Bright-Landry Hockey Center; Allston, MA	No. 17 Cornell	3	Harvard	1	
170	January 24, 2026	Lynah Rink; Ithaca, NY	No. 12 Cornell	4	Harvard	1	
171	March 13, 2026	Lynah Rink; Ithaca, NY	Harvard	3	No. 9 Cornell	1	ECAC Quarterfinal Game 1
172	March 14, 2026	Lynah Rink; Ithaca, NY	No. 9 Cornell	4	Harvard	0	ECAC Quarterfinal Game 2
173	March 15, 2026	Lynah Rink; Ithaca, NY	No. 9 Cornell	5	Harvard	2	ECAC Quarterfinal Game 3
Series: Cornell leads 87–72–14

== Series facts ==
Statistic	Cornell	Harvard
Games played	173	
Wins	87	72
Home wins	45	34
Road wins	33	27
Neutral site wins	9	11
Goals scored	546	574
Most goals scored in a game by one team	11 (21 February 1979)	18 (10 January 1959)
Most goals in a game by both teams	18 (10 January 1959 – Harvard 18, Cornell 0)	
Fewest goals in a game by both teams	1 (6 December 2003, 8 January 2005, 17 March 2023)	
Fewest goals scored in a game by one team in a win	1 (6 December 2003)	1 (8 January 2005, 17 March 2023)
Most goals scored in a game by one team in a loss	4 (7 times)	6 (1966, 1976)
Largest margin of victory	9 (18 December 1967)	18 (10 January 1959)
Longest winning streak	13 (20 December 1966 – 3 March 1971)	12 (27 January 1912 – 6 January 1962)
Longest unbeaten streak	13 (20 December 1966 – 3 March 1971)	12 (27 January 1912 – 6 January 1962)

== See also ==
- Lynah Rink (Cornell)
- Bright Hockey Center (Harvard)
- Harvard–Yale Regatta (rowing)
- The Game (Harvard vs. Yale, football)
