= Cornell Big Red =

Intercollegiate sports teams of Cornell University

- University: Cornell University
- Nickname: Big Red, The
- NCAA: Division I (FCS)
- Conference: Ivy League (primary) Other conferences: List: ECAC Hockey; Collegiate Sprint Football League; EARC (rowing); MAISA (sailing); USPA (polo); NCEA (women's equestrian); CSA (squash)
- Athletic director: Nicki Moore
- Location: Ithaca, New York, U.S.
- Varsity teams: 37
- Football stadium: Schoellkopf Field
- Basketball arena: Newman Arena
- Ice hockey arena: Lynah Rink
- Baseball stadium: Booth Field
- Softball stadium: Niemand-Robison Softball Field
- Soccer stadium: Berman Field
- Golf course: Robert Trent Jones Golf Course
- Sailing venue: Merrill Family Sailing Center
- Volleyball arena: Newman Arena
- Colors: Carnelian red and white
- Mascot: Touchdown (unofficial)
- Fight song: "Give My Regards to Davy"
- Website: cornellbigred.com
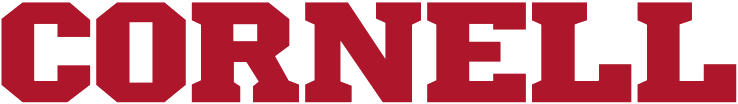

Cornell Big Red is the informal name of the sports and other competitive teams that represent Cornell University in Ithaca, New York. The university sponsors 37 varsity sports, and several intramural and club teams. Cornell participates in NCAA Division I as part of the Ivy League.

The men's and women's ice hockey teams compete in the ECAC Hockey League. Additionally, teams compete in the National Intercollegiate Women's Fencing Association, the Collegiate Sprint Football League, the Eastern Association of Rowing Colleges (EARC), the Eastern Association of Women's Rowing Colleges (EAWRC), the Middle Atlantic Intercollegiate Sailing Association, and until 2025 the Eastern Intercollegiate Wrestling Association (EIWA).

== History ==
Cornell's teams did not have an official name until after 1905, when a recent graduate, Romeyn Berry '04, wrote lyrics for a new football song. The lyrics included the words "the big, red team," and the nickname stuck.

Cornell does not have an official mascot; however, the bear has long been a symbol of Cornell Athletics. In 1915, a live bear named Touchdown first appeared at football games to represent Cornell. The current version, which appears at many of Cornell's sporting events, is a brown bear costume, which replaced the live bear in 1939, that is worn by an undergraduate student; it is referred to as the "Big Red Bear" or by its nickname, "Touchdown." "Red man," a person dressed in a tight red suit, has been seen running up and down the field of men's soccer games.

Cornell's colors, carnelian red and white, date back to the university's Inauguration Day on October 7, 1868.

Many of Cornell's athletic directors have made substantial contributions to collegiate athletics in general, including Romeyn Berry, James Lynah, and Robert Kane.

Big Red sports are covered in the two campus publications, The Cornell Daily Sun and The Cornell Review, and various blogs.

=== Fight songs ===
A number of fight songs are associated with Cornell sports teams, such as "The Big Red Team", "Fight for Cornell", and "New Cornell Fight Song", but the one with the longest use and tradition is "Give My Regards to Davy", a song written by three Cornellians in 1904. The song is sung to the tune of George M. Cohan's "Give My Regards to Broadway".

== Athletics ==
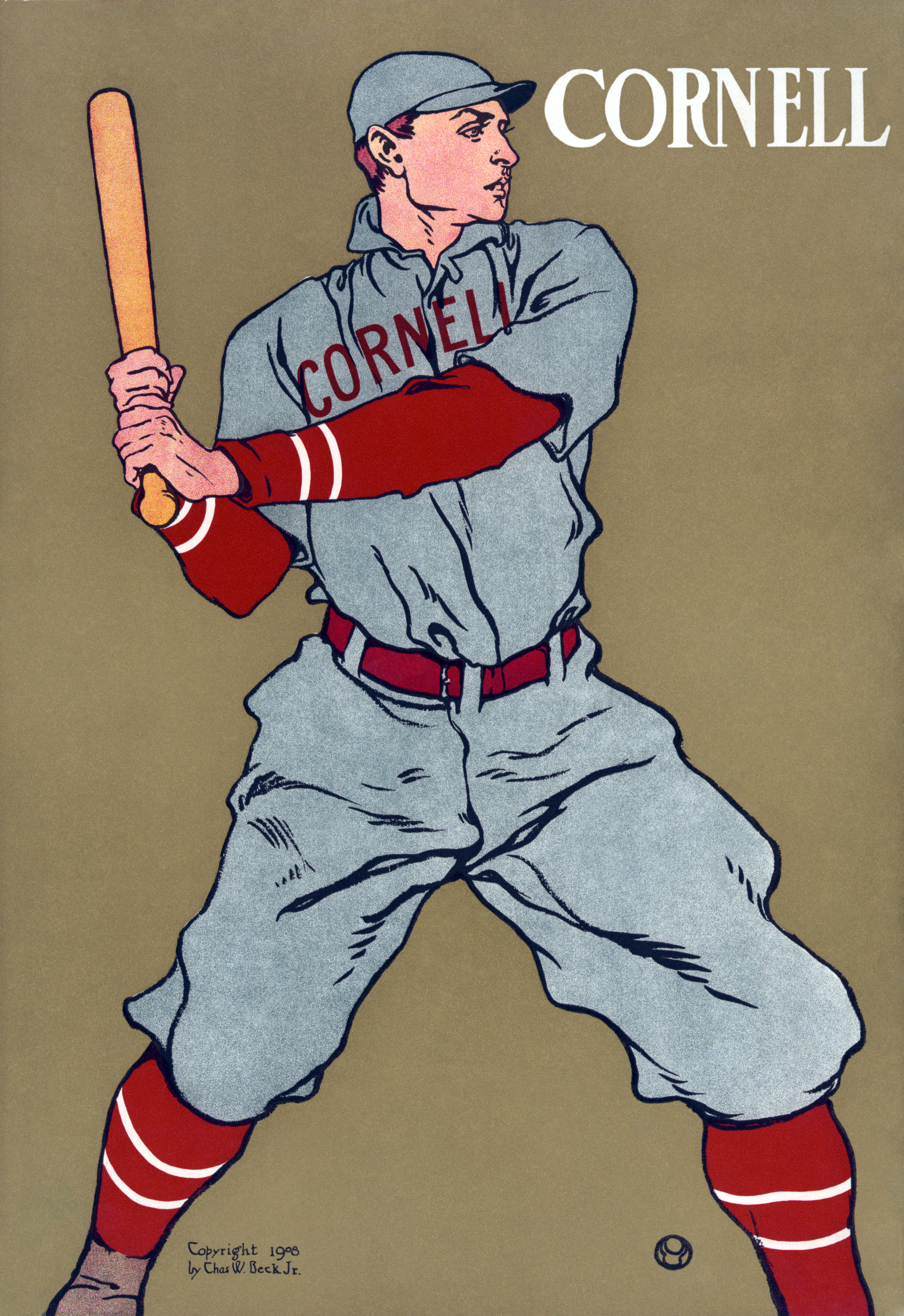
A 1908 poster illustration of a Cornell Big Red baseball player

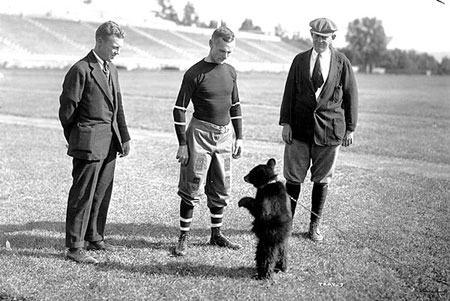
Touchdown III in 1920

Men's sports	Women's sports
Baseball	Basketball
Basketball	Cross country
Cross country	Equestrian
Football	Fencing
Golf	Field hockey
Ice hockey	Gymnastics
Lacrosse	Ice hockey
Polo	Lacrosse
Rowing (heavyweight)	Polo
Rowing (lightweight)	Rowing
Soccer	Sailing
Sprint Football	Soccer
Squash	Softball
Swimming & diving	Squash
Tennis	Swimming & diving
Track and field^{†}	Tennis
Wrestling	Track and field^{†}
	Volleyball
† – Track and field includes both indoor and outdoor.

The sprint football team has won the CSFL title six times. The men's ice hockey team has been NCAA champion twice, ECAC champion 14 times and Ivy League champion 26 times and recorded the only undefeated season in NCAA Division I Hockey history in 1970. The men's lacrosse team has been NCAA champion four times and Ivy League champion 33 times. The men's lightweight rowing team varsity 8+ has won the IRA regatta eight times since 1992 (1992, 2006–08, 2014, 2015, 2017, 2019). The women's polo team has won the National Women's Polo Championship 15 times, and the women's hockey team has been Ivy League champion 16 times.

=== Championship teams ===
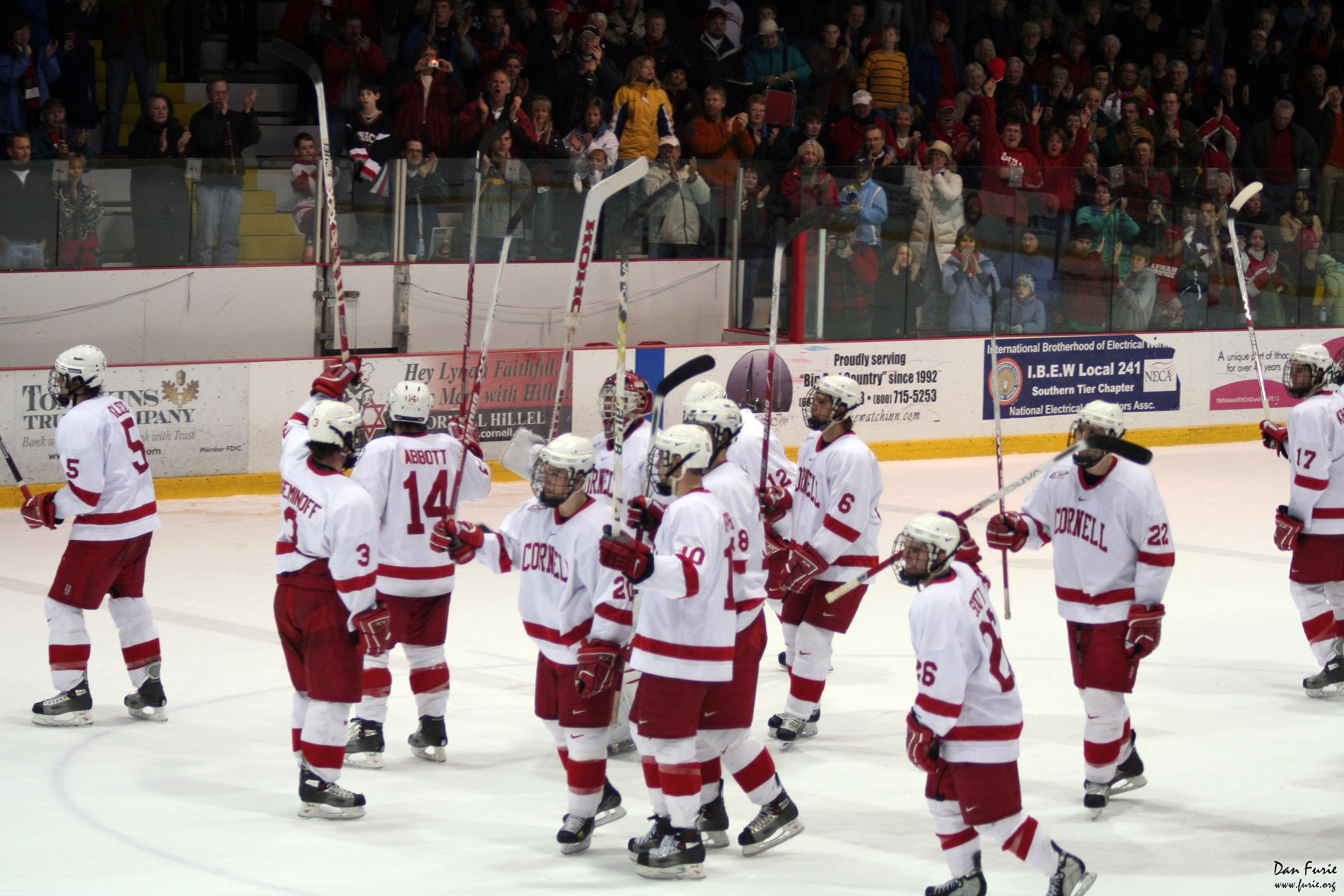
Lynah Rink

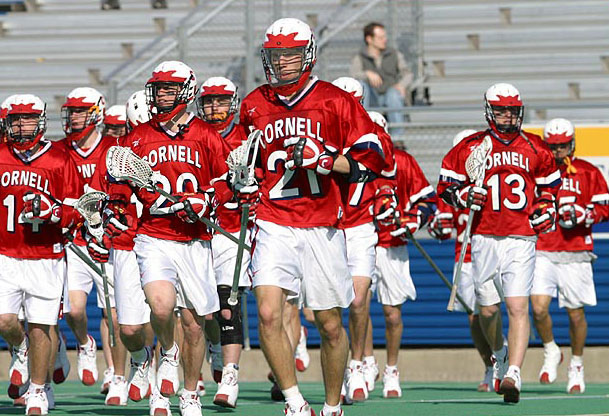
Cornell Big Red men's lacrosse

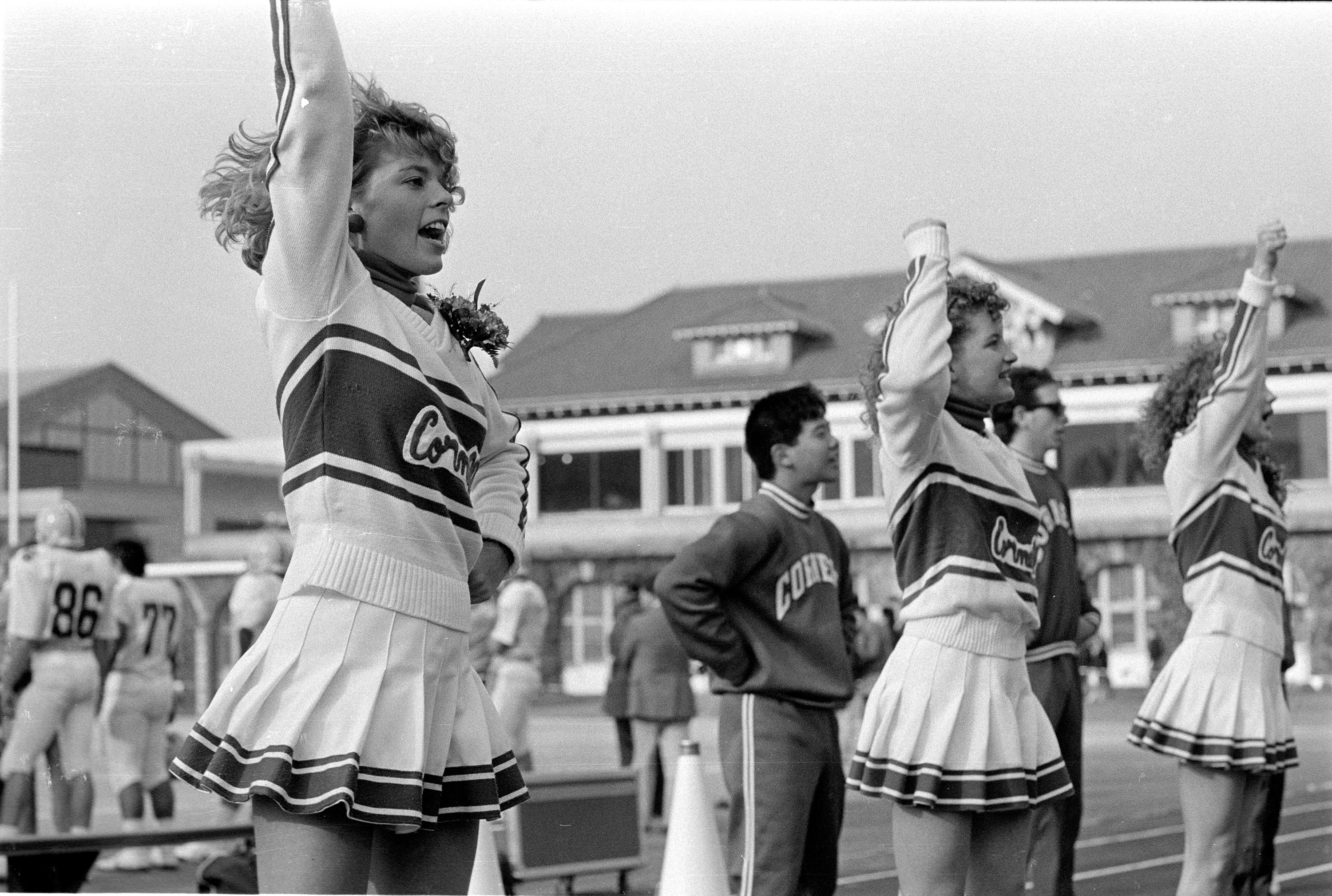
Cornell cheerleaders in 1987

Baseball

- Ivy 1972, 1977, 1979, 1982, 2012
- EIBL 1939, 1940, 1952, 1972, 1977

Men's basketball

- Ivy 1988, 2008, 2009, 2010

Women's basketball

- Ivy 2008

Men's heavyweight crew

- Cornell's Crews have won more RAAC (12 of 21)(1871–1894) and IRA National Championships (26) than any other university, most recently:
- IRA National 1955, 1956, 1957, 1958, 1962, 1963, 1971, 1977, 1981, 1982
- Eastern Sprints 1956, 1957, 1960, 1963

Men's lightweight crew

- IRA National 1992, 2006, 2007 2008 2014, 2015, 2017, 2019
- Eastern Sprints 1949, 1963, 1964, 1965, 1967, 1992, 2006, 2008, 2014, 2015, 2017
- Ivy League 1962, 1963, 1964, 1965, 1967, 1992, 2006, 2008, 2014, 2015, 2017

Women's crew

- IRA National 1989

Men's cross country

- Heptagonal Champions 1939, 1940, 1953, 1954, 1955, 1957, 1961, 1963, 1993
- Ivy Champions 1957, 1961, 1963, 1992, 1993

Women's cross country

- Heptagonal Champions 1991, 1992, 1993, 1998, 2011, 2012

Women's fencing

- National Intercollegiate Women's Fencing Association (NIWFA) Champions 1967, 1968, and 1969

Football

- National 1915, 1921, 1922, 1939
- Ivy 1971, 1988, 1990

Sprint football

- CSFL 1975(Co-Champs), 1978, 1982, 1984(Tri-Champs), 1986(Tri-Champs), 2006

Field hockey

- Ivy 1991

Men's ice hockey

- NCAA 1967, 1970
- ECAC (14) 1967, 1968, 1969, 1970, 1973, 1980, 1986, 1996, 1997, 2003, 2005, 2010, 2024, 2025
- Ivy (27) 1966, 1967, 1968, 1969, 1970, 1971, 1972, 1973, 1977, 1978, 1983*, 1984*, 1985*, 1996, 1997, 2002, 2003, 2004*, 2005, 2012, 2014, 2018, 2019, 2020, 2023, 2024, 2026 (*shared title)
- Ned Harkness Cup 2003, 2005, 2008, 2013

Women's ice hockey

- NCAA Frozen Four 2010, 2011, 2012, 2019, 2025
- ECAC (5) 2010, 2011, 2013, 2014, 2025
- Ivy (18) 1976, 1977, 1978, 1979, 1980, 1981, 1990, 1996, 2010, 2011, 2012, 2013, 2017, 2018, 2020, 2024, 2025, 2026

Men's lacrosse

- NCAA 1971, 1976, 1977, 2025
- Ivy (34) 1966, 1968, 1969*, 1970, 1971, 1972, 1974, 1975, 1976, 1977, 1978, 1979, 1980*, 1981, 1982, 1983*, 1987, 2003*, 2004*, 2005, 2006*, 2007, 2008*, 2009*, 2010*, 2011, 2013, 2014*, 2015*, 2022*, 2023, 2024, 2025, 2026* (*shared title)
- Ivy League Tournament Champions 2011, 2018, 2025

Women's lacrosse

- Ivy 2006*, 2017* (* shared)

Men's polo

- National 1937, 1955, 1956, 1958, 1959, 1961, 1962, 1963, 1966, 1992, 2005, 2024 (Div. II)

Women's polo

- National 1979, 1984, 1985, 1986, 1987, 1988, 1991, 2000, 2001, 2002, 2003, 2004, 2011, 2015, 2016, 2025 (Div. II)

Men's soccer

- Ivy 1975*, 1977, 1995*, 2012, 2026 (* shared)
- Ivy League Tournament Champions 2026

Women's soccer

- Ivy 1987, 1991, 1992

Softball

- Ivy 1999, 2001, 2004, 2009, 2010

Men's swimming

- Ivy 1984 (co-champions)

Men's tennis

- Ivy 2011, 2017*, 2026* (* shared title)

Men's track

- Indoor Heptagonal Champions 1953, 1955, 1958, 1977, 1978, 2003, 2005, 2006, 2008, 2009, 2013, 2014
- Outdoor Heptagonal Champions 1939, 1951, 1955, 1958, 1978, 1985, 2003, 2004, 2005, 2006, 2007, 2008, 2009, 2010 2014, 2016

Women's track

- Indoor Heptagonal Champions 1991, 1995, 2003, 2004, 2005, 2006, 2007, 2009
- Outdoor Heptagonal Champions 1991, 1992, 1995, 1997, 2002, 2003, 2004, 2005, 2006, 2007, 2008, 2010, 2012, 2013

Volleyball

- Ivy 1991, 1992, 1993, 2004, 2005, 2006, 2026

Men's wrestling

- EIWA champions 1910, 1912–1917, 1922, 1923, 1926, 1930, 1958, 1992, 1993, 2007-2017, 2022, 2023, 2024
- Ivy League champions (44) 1957–1960, 1962–1966, 1973, 1974, 1983, 1984, 1987–1993, 1995, 1999, 2001, 2003–2019, 2022, 2023, 2024, 2025
- NCAA Runner-up 2010, 2011, 2024
- Ivy League tournament champions 2025, 2026

=== Other teams ===
- Equestrian
- Gymnastics
- Men's Golf

Men's Squash

- Men's Swimming and Diving
- Women's Fencing
- Women's Squash
- Women's Swimming and Diving

=== Club teams ===
- Alpine Skiing
- Cornell University Men's Fencing Club
- Women's Club Ultimate Team
- Cornell University Figure Skating Club
- Men's Club Volleyball Team
- Men's Club Ultimate Team
- Cornell University Rowing Club
- Cornell University Rugby Football Club (men's)
- Cornell Women's Rugby Football Club
- Cornell Men's Club Swim Team
- Cornell Women's Club Swim Team

== Facilities ==
Selected Facilities

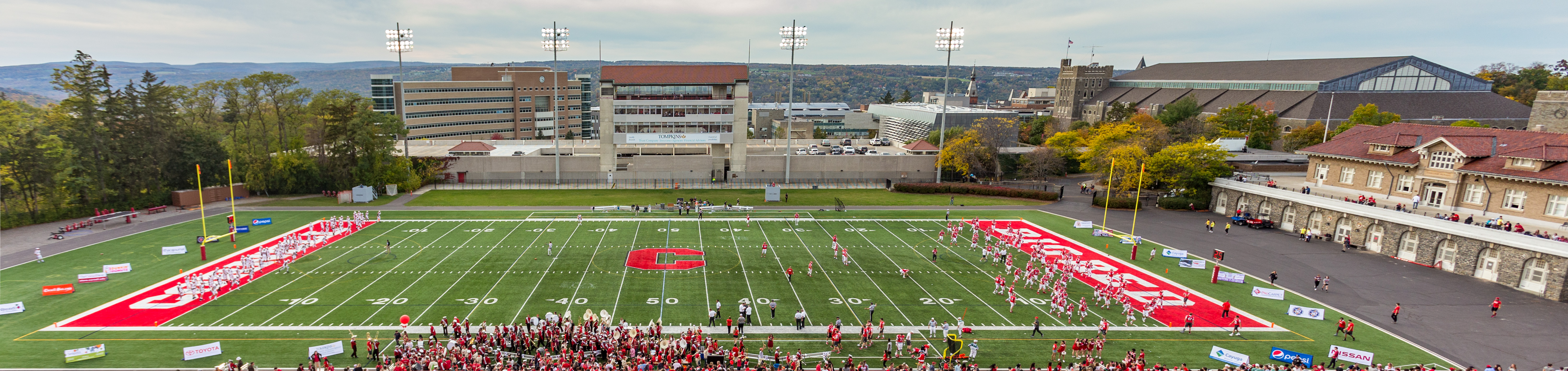
Schoellkopf Field with Schoellkopf Memorial Hall at right

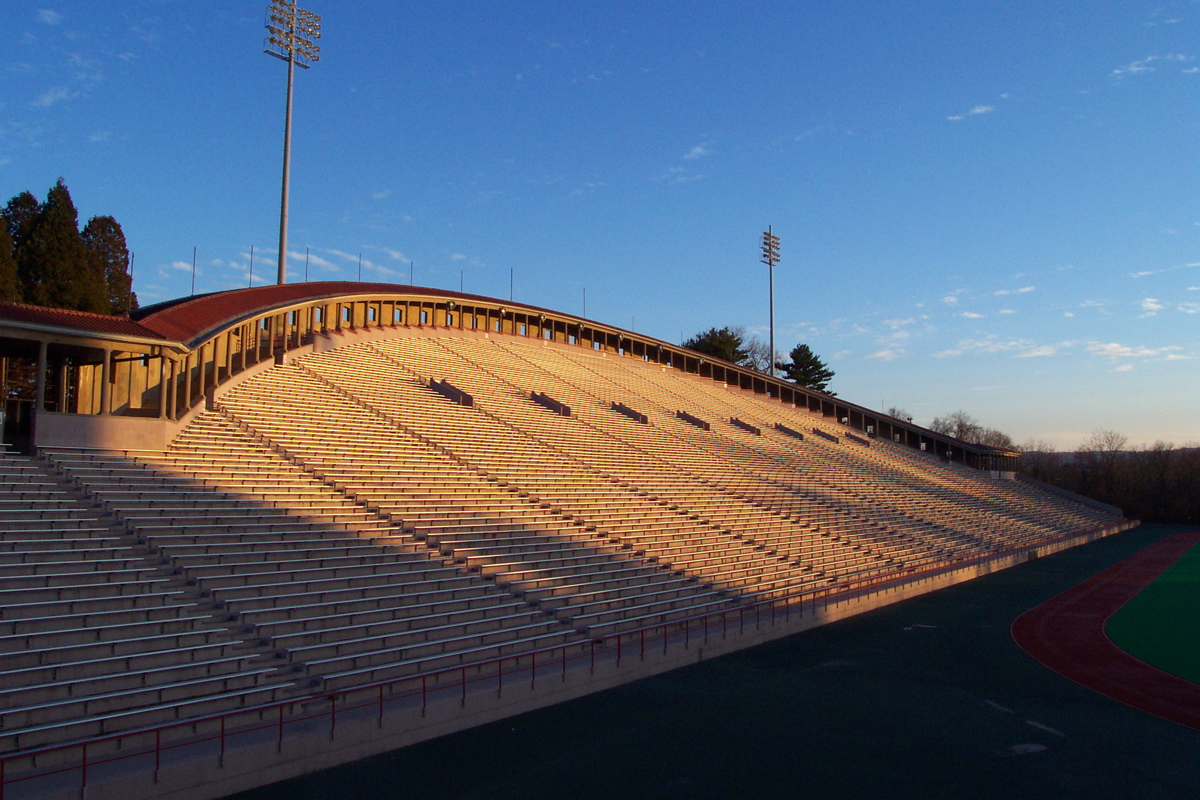
Schoellkopf Crescent

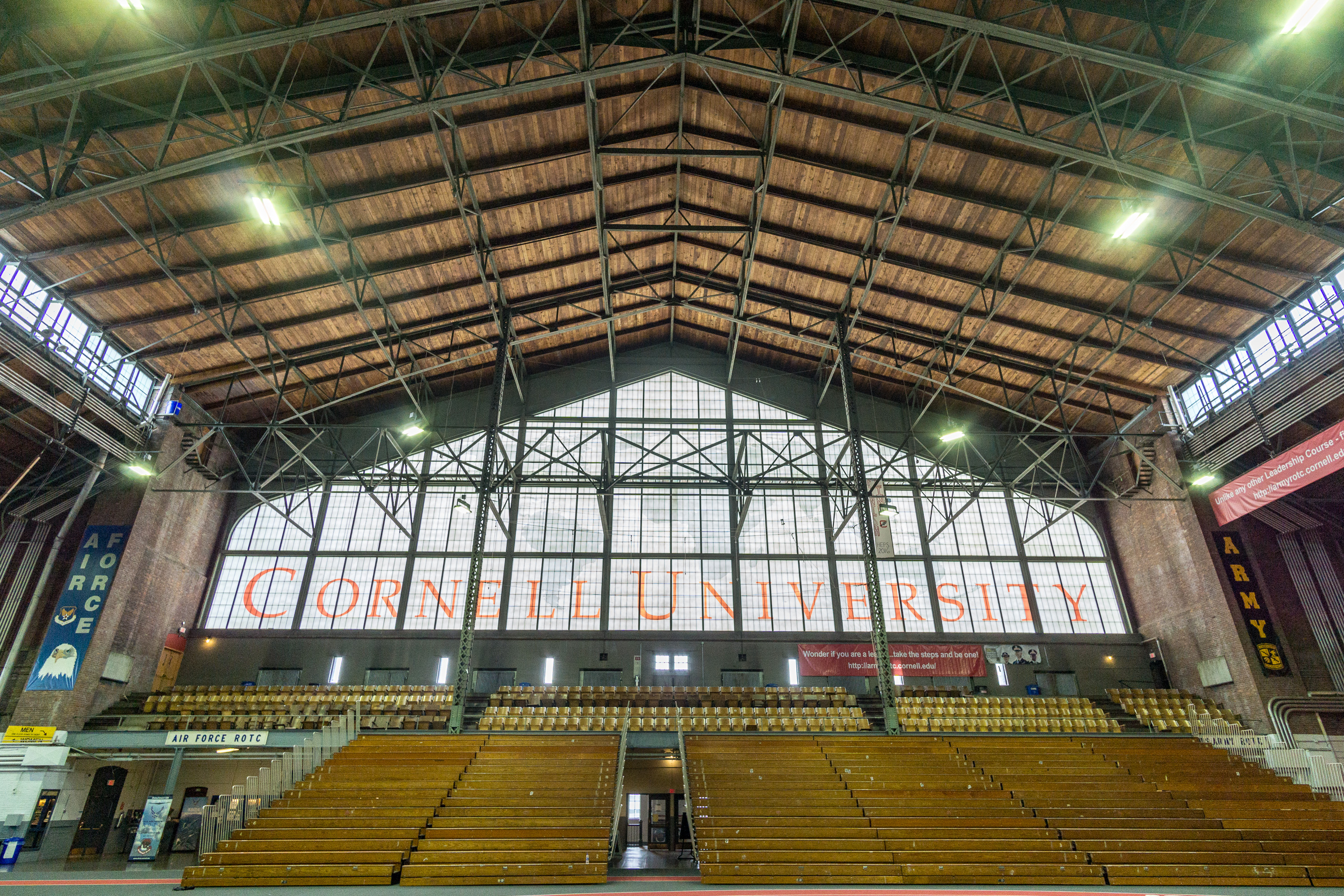
Barton Hall

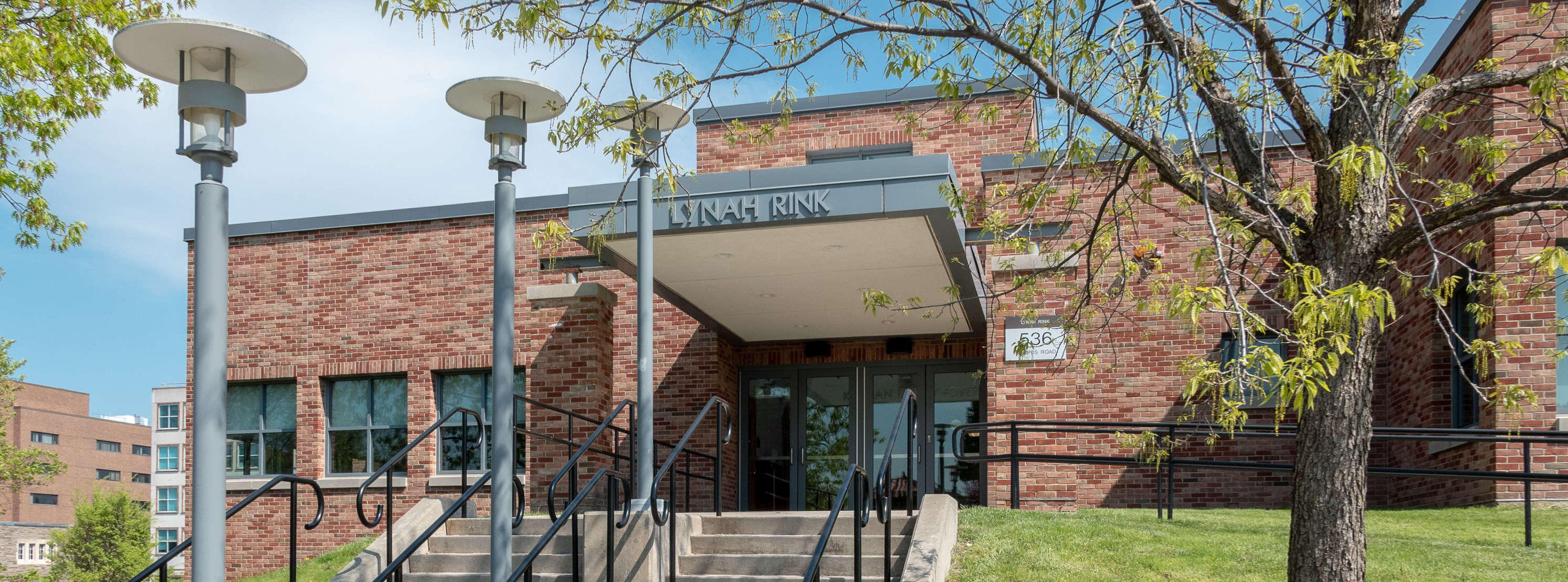
Lynah Rink

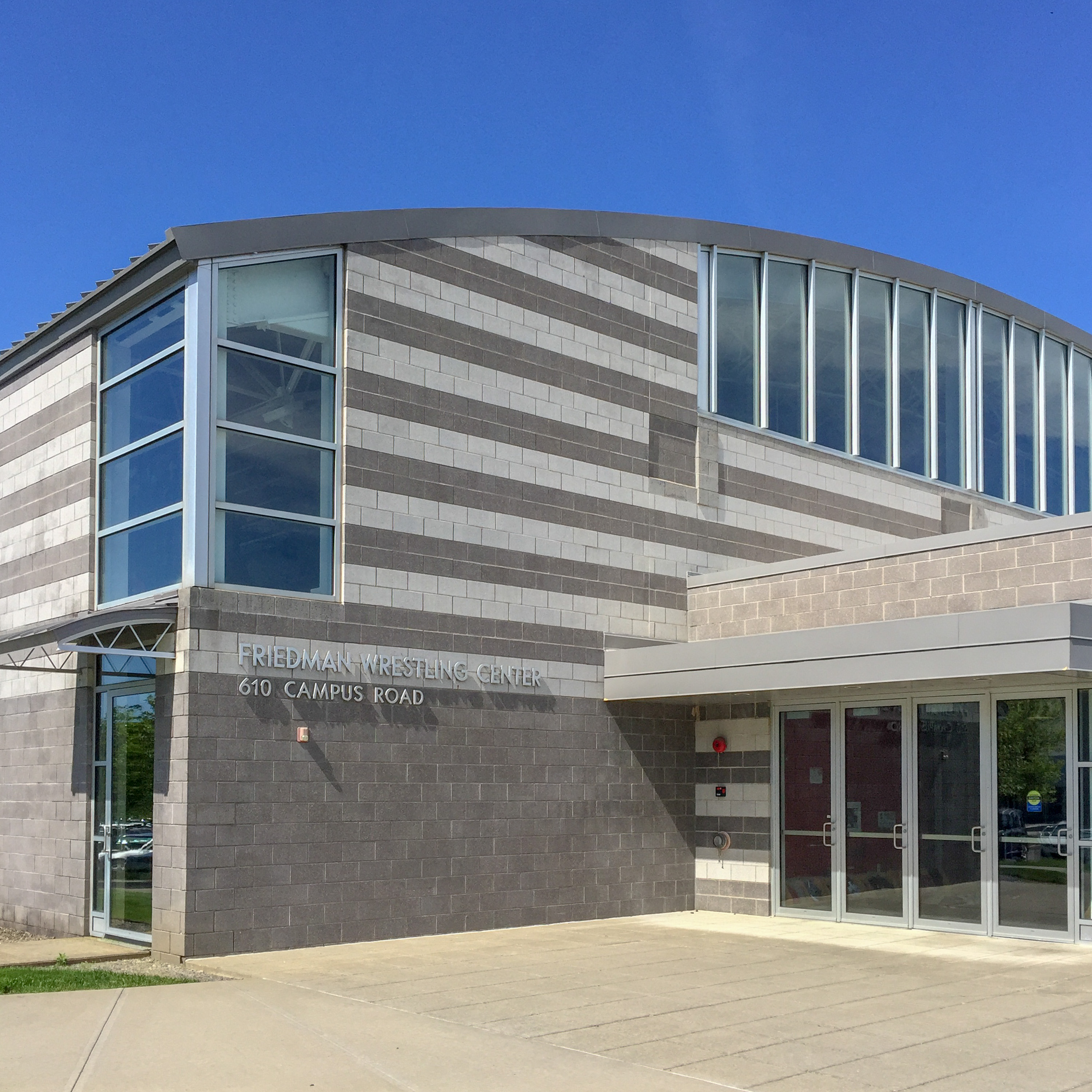
Friedman Wrestling Center

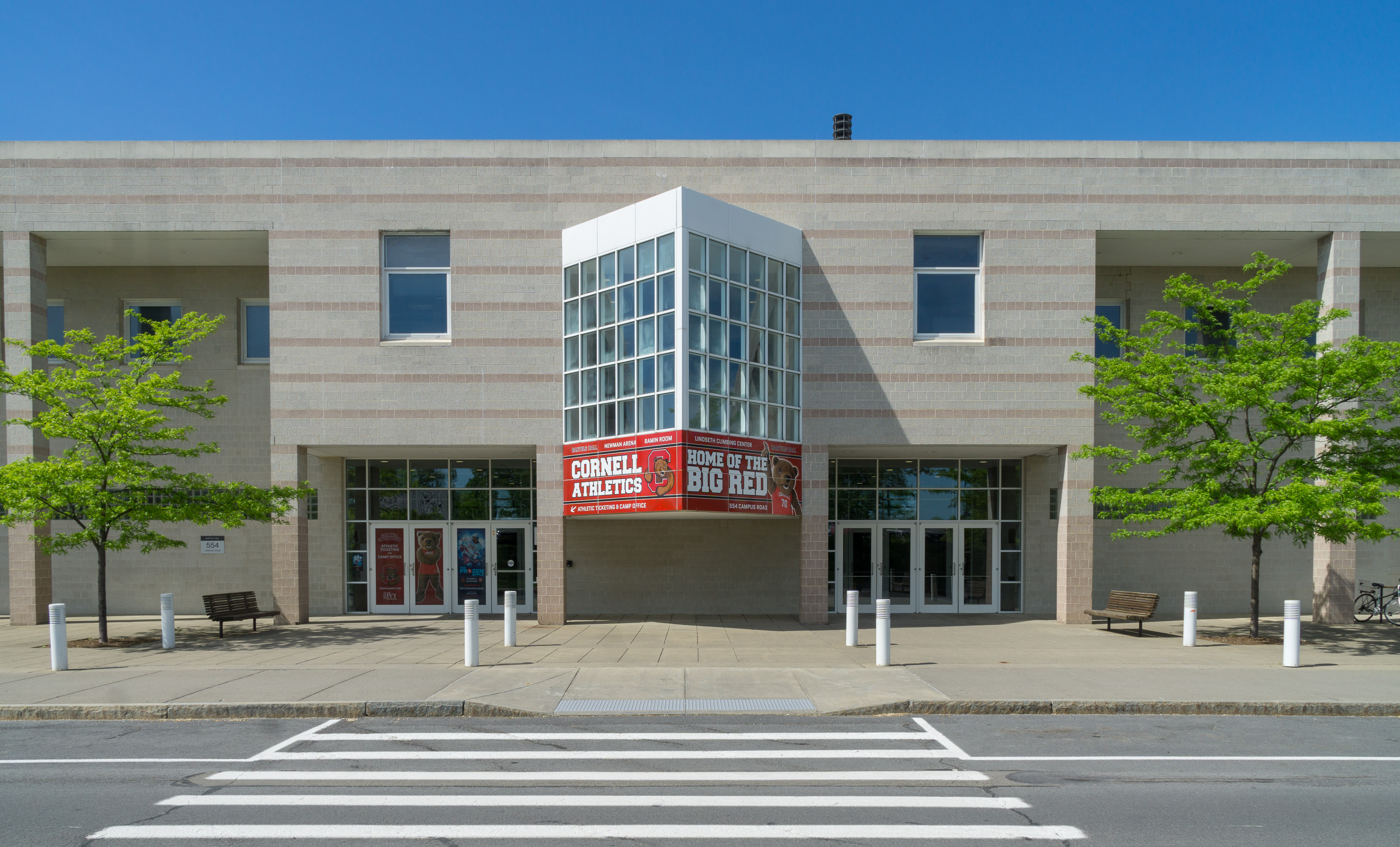
Bartels Hall

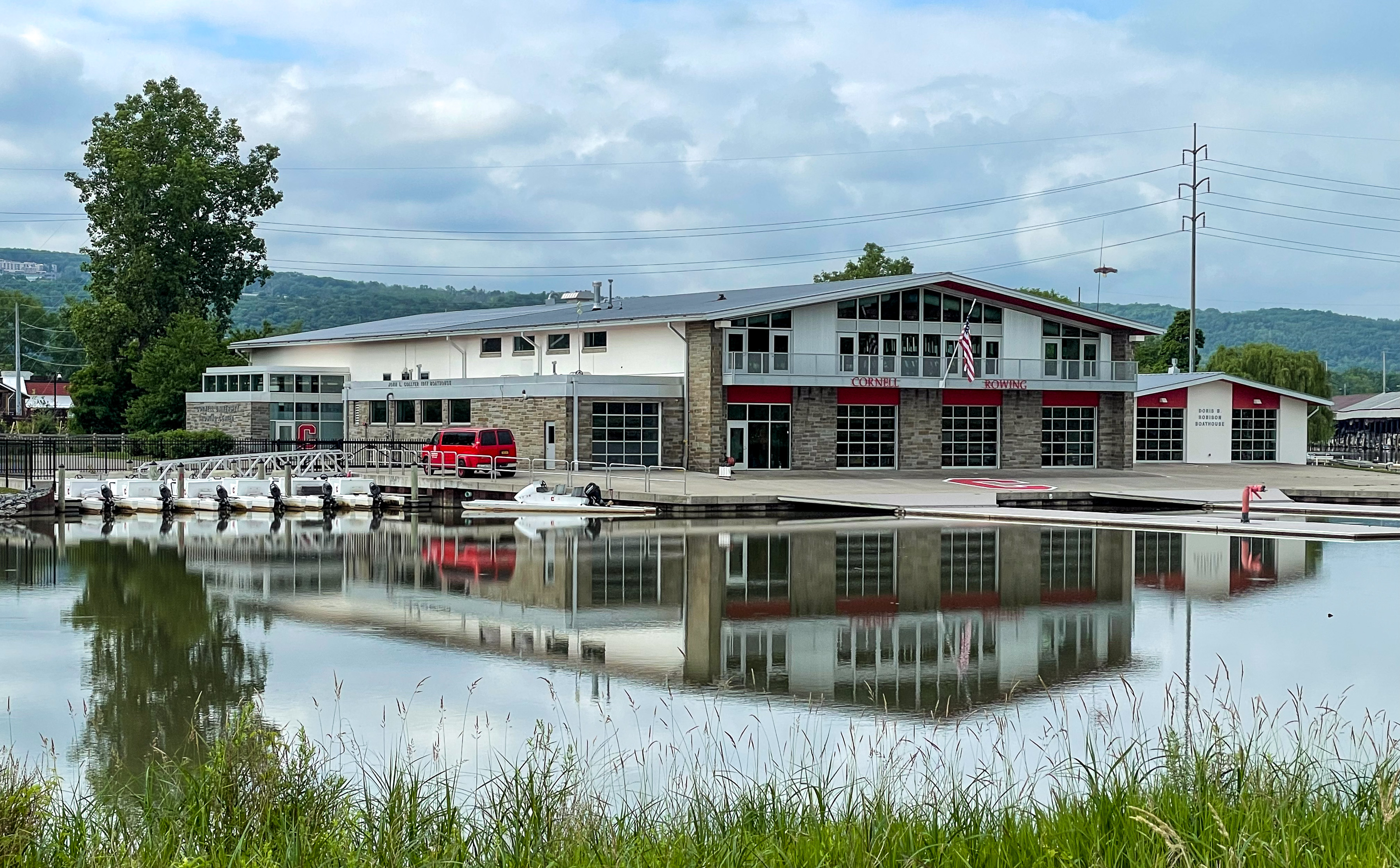
Collyer Boathouse

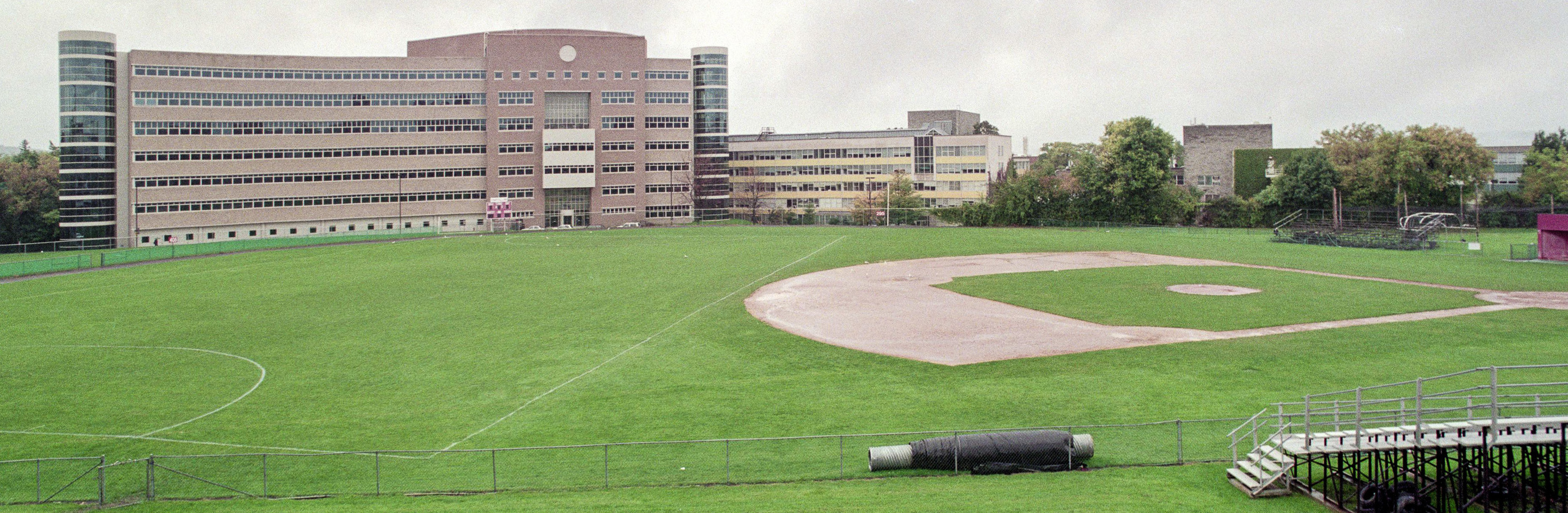
Hoy Field

The football, lacrosse, and sprint football teams play in Schoellkopf Field, which has a capacity of 25,597. The ice hockey teams play in Lynah Rink, which has a capacity of 4,267. The Cornell men's wrestling team competes at the Friedman Wrestling Center with a capacity of 1,100. Cornell soccer teams play on Charles F. Berman Field on the southeast side of campus. In August 2000, the bleachers and lights were completed, with a capacity of over 1,000. Field hockey plays on Marsha Dodson Field. The Cornell Men's and Women's Track and Field Teams compete in Barton Hall, a converted military hangar, for indoor track, and the Robert J. Kane sports complex for outdoor track. There are also facilities about 2 miles east of campus that has multiple uses, but it is mainly used by the Cornell men's soccer team for practice. Other campus facilities include a Robert Trent Jones (a Cornell alumnus) designed golf course, baseball's Hoy Field, the Niemand•Robison Softball Field, the Oxley Equestrian Center, and numerous fields and gymnasiums. Some of the athletic playing fields along Tower Road are known as the "Alumni Fields" because the Cornell Alumni Association funded the grading and development of these fields in exchange for a promise that they would remain in perpetuity. A subsequent land swap resulted in giving the Agriculture College building sites at the east end of the fields in exchange for the site of what became Schoellkopf Field and Hoy Field. The Alumni Fields became the site of an underground Synchrotron Laboratory.

Since the 1970s, several of the fields were used as sites for new biology buildings and were replaced by new fields along Jessup Road. Today, facilities are spread around campus with tennis courts and basketball courts located near a number of dormitories. In addition, the athletics department operates Helen Newman Hall (formerly the women's athletics building) and Noyes Center as remote fitness facilities.

The men's and women's crew programs are housed in the John Collyer Class of 1917 Boathouse and Doris B. Robison Boathouse on Cayuga Inlet. Both boathouses underwent an $8 million renovation in 2011.

== Rivalries ==
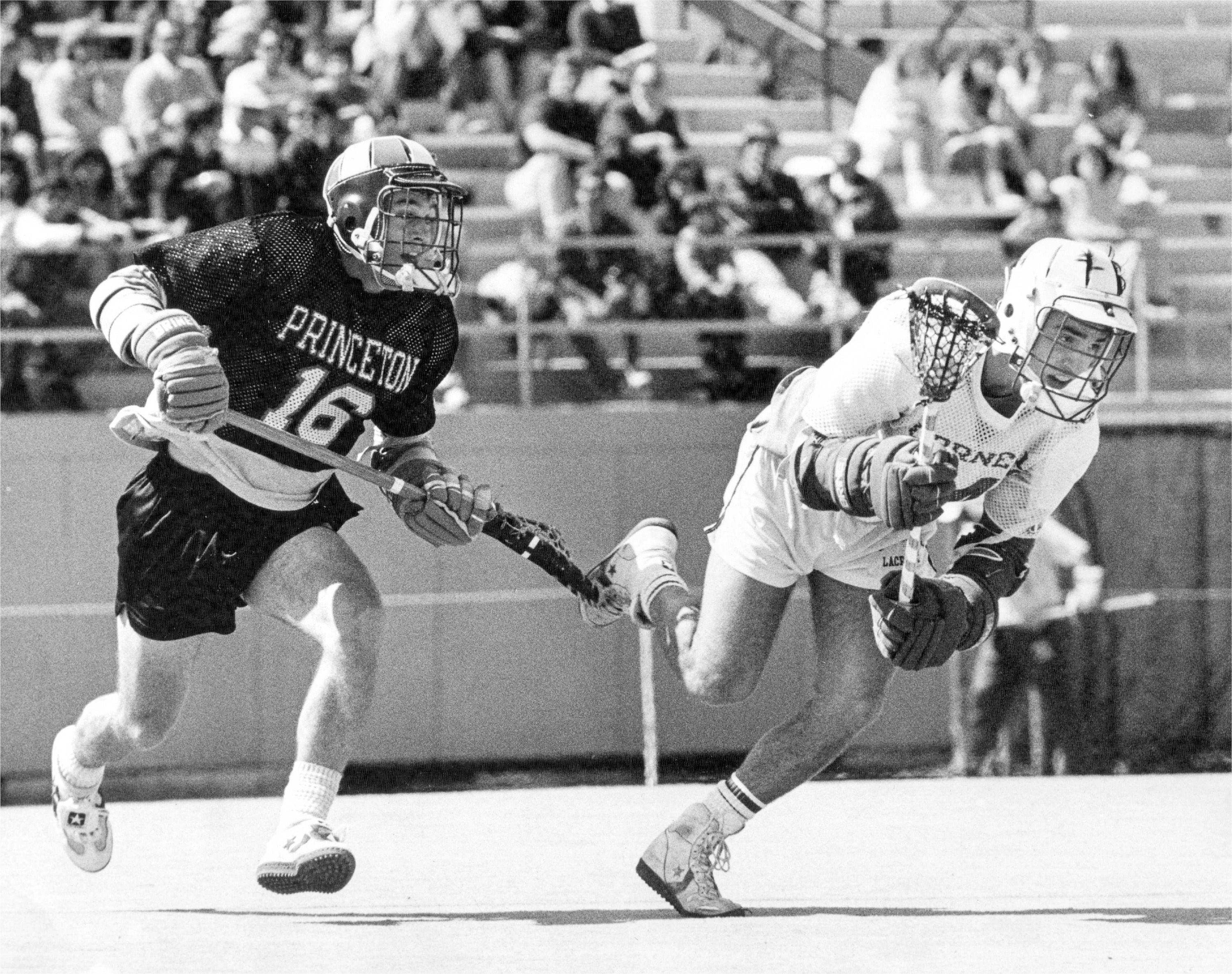
Cornell–Princeton lacrosse rivalry

Cornell maintains informal athletic rivalries with other collegiate institutions. Cornell's principal rival is Harvard. The men's ice hockey team has a historic rivalry with Harvard, which dates back to 1910 and includes many championship meetings. The Cornell-Harvard ice hockey rivalry was highlighted in the 1970 novel Love Story and its film adaptation. Following tradition, when Harvard plays the men's ice hockey team at Cornell's Lynah Rink, some Big Red fans throw fish on the ice. A historic rivalry with Boston University, dating back to when Cornell and Boston University played in ECAC Hockey before the creation of Hockey East, is maintained by biennial games at Madison Square Garden in Manhattan, dubbed "Red Hot Hockey," on Thanksgiving weekend.

Cornell and the University of Pennsylvania are long-time rivals in football, having played each other in 130 games since their first meeting in 1893, representing one of the most-played rivalries in college football. Cornell's football series against both Pennsylvania and Dartmouth are tied for second longest uninterrupted college football match-ups in history, both dating back to 1919. Cornell and Penn play for the Trustees Cup. They are only surpassed by the Lehigh-Lafayette series, which is uninterrupted since 1897.

In polo, the men's and women's teams maintain rivalries with the University of Virginia and the University of Connecticut.

For men's lacrosse, Cornell and Princeton University have historically been the perennial favorites in the Ivy League and the Princeton game is usually the most anticipated Ivy-game. Fellow upstate schools Syracuse University and Hobart are also considered Cornell's lacrosse rivals.

In women's equestrian, Skidmore College is an ongoing rival.

== See also ==
- Columbia–Cornell football rivalry
- Cornell–Dartmouth football rivalry
- Cornell–Harvard hockey rivalry
- Cornell–Penn football rivalry
- Cornell–Princeton lacrosse rivalry
- List of Cornell University alumni
- Lynah Rink
- Touchdown (mascot)
