= Bill Walkenbach =

American college baseball coach

Current position
- Title: Head coach
- Team: Claremont-Mudd-Scripps
- Conference: SCIAC (DIII)
- Record: 0-0

Biographical details
- Born: Claremont, California, U.S.
- Education: Cornell '98 (B.A.); Georgia State '03 (M.A.)

Playing career
- 1995–1998: Cornell
- Position: Shortstop

Coaching career (HC unless noted)
- 2002–2003: Emory (asst.)
- 2004–2005: Cornell (asst.)
- 2006–2008: Franklin & Marshall
- 2009–2015: Cornell
- 2016–present: Claremont-Mudd-Scripps

Head coaching record
- Overall: 199-197
- Tournaments: NCAA D1: 0-2; Ivy Champ. Series: 3-3; NCAA D3: 1-2; Centennial: 3-4

Accomplishments and honors

Championships
- Ivy Champ. Series: 2012; Gehrig Division: 2009, 2012; Centennial: 2006, 2007; Centennial Tournament: 2006

Bill Walkenbach is an American college baseball coach, currently the head coach of Division III Claremont-Mudd-Scripps. Previously, he was the head coach at Cornell from 2009 season to 2015 season and at Franklin & Marshall from 2006 to 2008. Walkenbach led both of these schools to an NCAA tournament appearance.

== Playing career ==
Walkenbach attended Cornell, where he played baseball from 1995 to 1998. A shortstop, he was named All-Ivy League as a first-teamer in his freshman and sophomore seasons and a second-teamer in his junior and senior seasons.

== Coaching career ==
=== Assistant positions ===
Walkenbach's coaching career began in the early 2000s, when he served as an assistant at Division III Emory from 2002 to 2003. In 2003, Walkenbach served as assistant coach of the Yarmouth–Dennis Red Sox, a collegiate summer baseball team in the Cape Cod Baseball League. His first Division I came as an assistant at Cornell from 2004 to 2005. In 2005, the Big Red won their first Gehrig Division title but lost to Harvard in the Ivy Championship Series.

=== Franklin & Marshall ===
His first head coaching job was at Division III Franklin & Marshall (F&M), where he coached from 2006 to 2008, replacing Brett Boretti, who had left to become the head coach at Columbia. In three seasons, the Diplomats had a 69–42 record under Walkenbach. They won the Centennial Conference regular season title in 2006 and 2007 and the Centennial Tournament in 2006. In the 2006 NCAA tournament, the team went 1–2 in the Mid-Atlantic Regional. It beat Gwynedd Mercy in the opener, then lost to TCNJ and Montclair State and was eliminated. F&M's Ted Serro won the 2006 Centennial Pitcher of the Year award, and Gary Kruger was named the Player of the Year. Serro was selected by the Toronto Blue Jays in the 2006 MLB draft.

=== Cornell ===
Ahead of the 2009 season, Walkenbach was hired as the head coach at Cornell. He replaced his old coach, Tom Ford, who was demoted to associate head coach.

In 2009, Cornell shared the Gehrig Division title with Princeton. They defeated the Tigers in the divisional playoff game but lost to Dartmouth in the Ivy Championship Series.

After losing records in conference in 2010 and 2011, Cornell won the Gehrig Division again in 2012. The Big Red went 29-14-1 (15-5 Ivy) in the regular season. Cornell hosted a rematch against Dartmouth in the Ivy Championship Series at Hoy Field. After splitting the first two games, Cornell won the decisive third game 3–1 in 11 innings on a Chris Cruz walk-off home run. It was Cornell's first Ivy League Title and gave them an automatic bid to the 2012 NCAA tournament. They went 0–2 at the Chapel Hill Regional, losing to host North Carolina 7-4 and second-seeded East Carolina 10–6.

Between 2009 and 2015, Cornell had one major award winner and two draftees under Walkenbach. In 2011, the Boston Red Sox selected Jadd Schmeltzer in the 49th round. In 2012, pitcher Kellon Urbon was unanimously selected the Ivy League Rookie of the Year. In 2014, the Arizona Diamondbacks took pitcher Brent Jones in the fourth round of the draft.

=== Claremont-Mudd-Scripps ===
Prior to the 2016 season, Walkenbach left Cornell to accept the head coaching position at Claremont-Mudd-Scripps, a Division III program in his hometown.

== Head coaching record ==
Below is a table of Walkenbach's yearly records as a collegiate head baseball coach.

Record table
Season	Team	Overall	Conference	Standing	Postseason
Franklin & Marshall (Centennial Conference – DIII) (2006–2008)
2006	Franklin & Marshall	29-11	16-2	1st	NCAA Regional
2007	Franklin & Marshall	21-14	15-3	T-1st	Centennial Tournament
2008	Franklin & Marshall	19-17	12-6	T-2nd	Centennial Tournament
Franklin & Marshall:		69-42	43-11		
Cornell (Ivy League) (2009–2015)
2009	Cornell	17-23	10-10	T-1st (Gehrig)	Ivy Championship Series
2010	Cornell	18-20	8-12	3rd (Gehrig)	
2011	Cornell	10-30	7-13	4th (Gehrig)	
2012	Cornell	31-17-1	14-6	1st (Gehrig)	NCAA Regional
2013	Cornell	23-17	11-9	T-2nd (Gehrig)	
2014	Cornell	18-21	9-11	3rd (Gehrig)	
2015	Cornell	13–27	9–11	3rd (Gehrig)	
Cornell:		130-155	68-72		
Total:		199-197			
National champion Postseason invitational champion Conference regular season champion Conference regular season and conference tournament champion Division regular season champion Division regular season and conference tournament champion Conference tournament champion

== Personal ==
Walkenbach has two daughters, Julia and Charlotte. He does not like tomatoes. Walkenbach's late wife, Beth, also graduated from Cornell. She has served as a field hockey coach at Cornell, Franklin & Marshall, and Ithaca.

== See also ==
- List of current NCAA Division I baseball coaches
- Cornell Big Red
