= Touchdown (mascot) =

Unofficial mascot of Cornell University

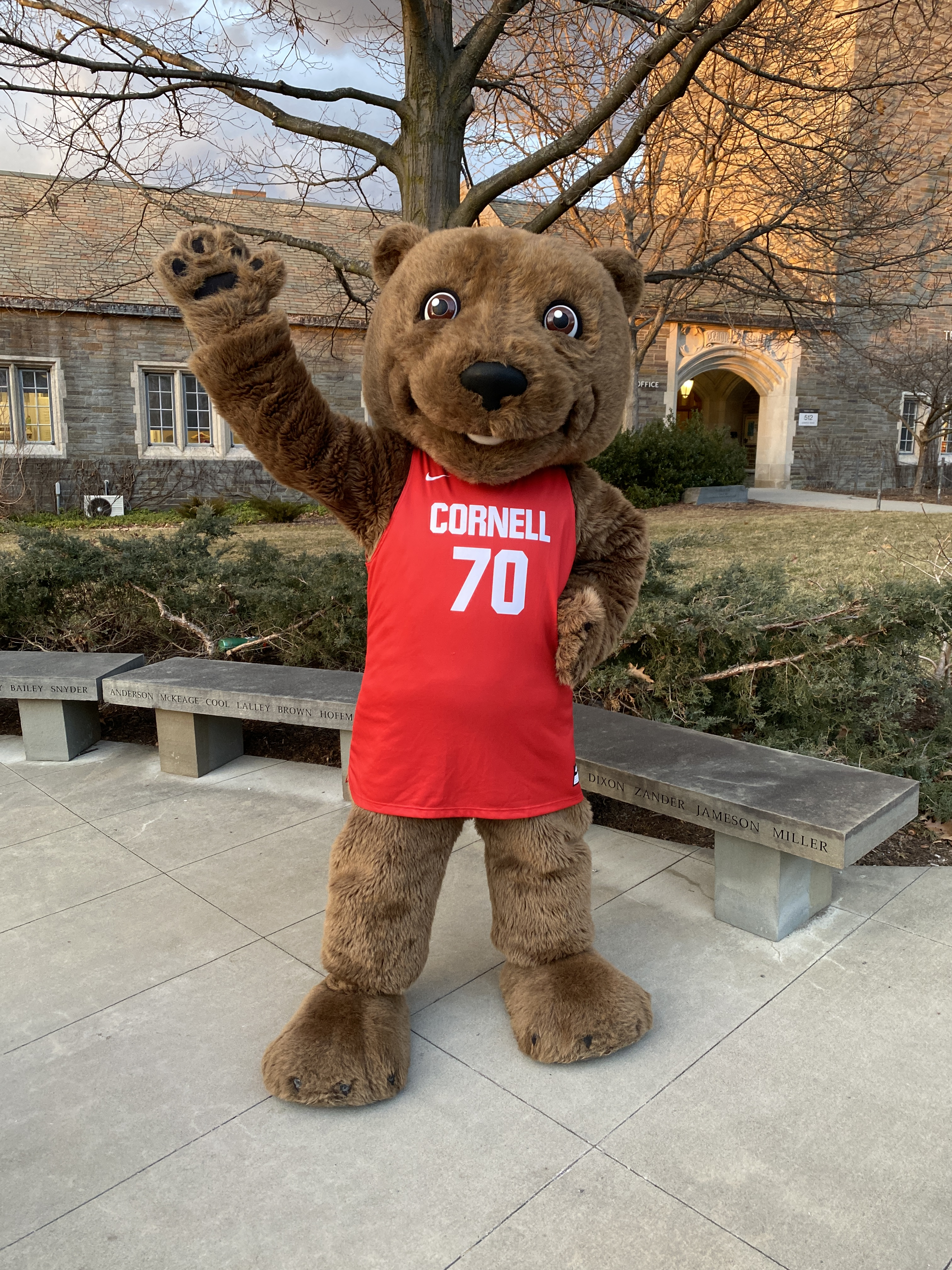
- Touchdown in 2023
- University: Cornell University
- Conference: Ivy League
- Description: Anthropomorphic bear
- First seen: 1915

Touchdown, or the Big Red Bear, is the unofficial mascot of Cornell University. The first mascot was an American black bear introduced in 1915 by the Cornell University Athletic Association.

Three more live bears over the course of approximately two decades also made appearances at Cornell until the live bear was replaced by costumed students some years later. Touchdown appears on the logo for Cornell Athletics, and is represented in a statue erected outside Teagle Hall in 2015.

== History ==
=== Touchdown I ===
The first mascot at Cornell was a black bear that the Cornell University Athletic Association (CUAA) acquired in the fall of 1915. The CUAA spent twenty-five dollars, excluding shipping costs, raised by the revenue from season ticket sales to purchase the bear. The bear was purchased after the manager of the football team received a letter from an animal trainer in Old Town, Maine. This year also marked the first year Cornell football went undefeated, which led to fans believing that Touchdown was a good omen.

Touchdown appeared at all of the games played by the Cornell football team that year. At the games, Touchdown was tethered to a stepladder so that he could climb on the home sideline of the field. He also climbed a goal post before each game, which quickly became a tradition for the fans.

At the Harvard game of 1915, Touchdown traveled with the team to Cambridge, Massachusetts. The night before the game, Touchdown was sleeping in a cage in the lobby of The Lenox Hotel at the request of the manager of the hotel.

At four o'clock in the morning of the game, several Harvard University students stole Touchdown by posing as caretakers of the bear giving Touchdown a routine morning walk. Touchdown was found later that morning by Cornell's trainer who heard cries coming from Harvard's baseball cage. Touchdown was only retrieved, however, after a posse of Cornell athletic managers stole the keys to the cage from a Harvard janitor who refused to open it without orders from Harvard football manager. The janitor was reprimanded by being locked in an office. Later that day at the game, the Cornell football team defeated the Crimson, ending Harvard's thirty-game winning streak in football.

The next week, the football team took a trip to Atlantic City, New Jersey before the big Thanksgiving game against the University of Pennsylvania in Philadelphia. At this point in the season, Touchdown had begun go into hibernation and was less vivacious than he was earlier in the season.

When Touchdown was woken to pose for pictures with the football team on a boardwalk at Atlantic City, he instead ran into the nearest open door. After running wild in a taffy shop, Touchdown escaped down a pier and jumped into the ocean. Two football players, Booty Hunkin and Walt Lalley, used a life raft with no paddles to rescue Touchdown, who was unable to swim. Touchdown walked back to the hotel alone.

Touchdown was deeper into the beginning stages of hibernation at the Thanksgiving Day football game. The University of Pennsylvania brought either a coyote or a husky to the game, and walked it over to meet Touchdown right before the game started. When Penn's mascot came close enough, Touchdown smacked it across the face and knocked it out. Cornell went on to defeat Penn 24-9 during the game.

After the season was over, the football team had to make a decision about the fate of Touchdown. Although there was some talk about sending him to a zoo in Rome, the bear was eventually sent back to Old Town, Maine, where he lived the rest of his life.

=== Touchdown II ===
In 1916, Walt Lalley, now the team's manager, recruited a black bear cub from Maine to take the place of Touchdown I. Although Touchdown II represented Cornell on the sidelines for the latter part of the season, he was kept under close protection off the field to prevent another kidnapping attempt.

On the final game of the season, University of Pennsylvania students brought a bear of their own onto the sideline named "Jack Victory," who, along with the football team, stole the show from Touchdown and the Big Red, defeating Cornell 23–0. The Cornell team then abandoned Touchdown II on the field after the loss. He was briefly adopted by Penn, and accompanied Penn's bear and the team to their Rose Bowl game in Pasadena, California, against Oregon. The bear's whereabouts after the Rose Bowl trip are unknown.

=== Touchdown III ===
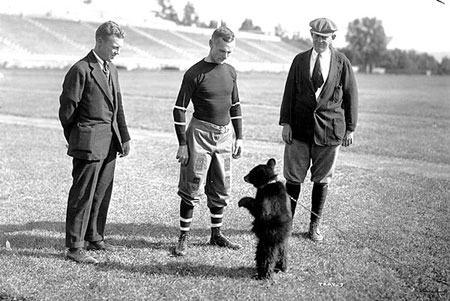
Touchdown III at Schoellkopf Field in 1919

Due to World War I capturing the attention of Cornell's students and faculty, there was no mascot for the 1917 and 1918 football seasons. Once campus life returned to normal in 1919, Montana-based Cornell alumnus R. H. Barney '17 donated a local bear for use as the football team's mascot. Dubbed Touchdown III, news of the bear's arrival at Cornell was covered by The New York Times.

The Cornell community's reception of Touchdown III was generally positive, though the mascot also had powerful enemies. The Cornell Daily Sun, the university's student newspaper, reported that Touchdown III was "the admiration of the entire [football] squad, as well as the coaching staff," echoing the Ithaca community's general sentiment. However, Cornell University Athletic Association head Romeyn Berry hated all bears, describing them as "disgusting . . . dangerous, ill-tempered, and unbelievably troublesome" and characterizing the original Touchdown as "hungry, mean, ill-bred, and dangerous."

During the 1919 football season, Touchdown III was involved in a few minor events on Cornell's campus. The week after the season began, Touchdown III broke free from his living quarters on Schoellkopf Field. Authorities and volunteers found the bear napping in a nearby grassy field, prompting a humorous Sun article entitled "Touchdown III Loses at Game of Hide and Seek." Touchdown III later led a parade of Cornell student demonstrators demanding higher salaries for professors. Touchdown III's involvement in this parade produced a classic photograph of the bear gnawing on a banner inscribed "I'm For Them Too."

Late in the season, the Cornell football team headed to New York City for a game against Dartmouth College. Although the team stayed at the Hotel Pennsylvania, they rushed Touchdown III directly to the Cornell Club of New York on 44th Street, where a smoker for Cornell alumni was taking place. This is the last known location of Touchdown III. Although legend states that he was sent to a zoo in Akron, Ohio, Touchdown III's true fate is currently unknown.

=== The Bearless Years ===
After Touchdown III's departure in 1919, Cornell was left without a mascot for its football team. Cornell would not adopt a new mascot until 1939. This long period without a mascot can be at least partially attributed to bear-hating CUAA head Romeyn Berry, whose tenure lasted until 1935. Some blame may also belong to Gil Dobie, Cornell's football coach from 1920 to 1935, whose no-nonsense approach had little room for wildlife distractions.

In fall of 1934, Cornell students decided to hold a pre-game party (or "Hop") before the Cornell vs. Dartmouth football game. At this Hop, Touchdown was revived as a life-sized painting. After Cornell won the football game, students attributed the victory to Touchdown's symbolic return.

After Dartmouth, University of Pennsylvania was Cornell's next opponent. In an attempt to replicate the Dartmouth game's result, three Cornell undergrads drove to Burnet Park Zoo in Syracuse and rented a bear as a temporary mascot. The bear immediately destroyed the Cornell students' trailer, however, and the students were forced to make do with Romeyn Berry dressed in a fur coat as the mascot for the pre-game Penn rally.

The student movement to bring back a live bear mascot continued to gain steam. Students' desire for a new bear was echoed in the Sun the day after the Penn rally, further legitimizing growing pro-Touchdown sentiments.

Although students were adamant about bringing back Touchdown, they encountered significant opposition, mainly from Romeyn Berry. In The Ithaca Journal in 1934, Berry rejected students' request for a bear, arguing that they would tire of a new Touchdown after about a week.

After stepping down from CUAA's leadership in 1935, Berry authored an article in the Cornell Alumni News in 1936, praising the fact that a bear had not been acquired for that year's football season. Even after his retirement, Berry harbored unchecked resentment for bears. His article referred to the previous Touchdown as a "disagreeable beast" characterized by a "fetid odor." But with Berry relieved from his CUAA position, he was no longer a factor in Cornell's mascot-related decisions.

=== Touchdown IV ===
In 1935, James A. Lynah became the athletic director of the newly formed Department of Physical Education and Athletics. Carl Snavely took over as the football coach, and helped to guide the team to an extremely successful 1939 season. During the season, the "Cornell Daily Sun editorial board [...] was a co-conspirator with the Press Club, the social journalistic society that brought [Touchdown IV] to campus." The Press Club purchased a female black bear cub from Nashua, New Hampshire, and adopted the bear as its mascot, hoping that Cornell Football would follow their lead. But Lynah forbid Touchdown IV from appearing at any football games.

The Cornell Daily Sun's editorial board wrote extensively throughout the 1939 season to attempt to sway Lynah. Touchdown IV's supporters included the Sigma Delta Chi fraternity, and Princeton Athletics, who delighted at the opportunity to mock Cornell for having a female bear as their mascot. Before Cornell's game with the undefeated Ohio State Buckeyes, a letter appeared in The Cornell Daily Sun from the Cornell Club in Cleveland, inviting Touchdown to the contest, logistics to be handled by the club. Touchdown never appeared on the field, but Cornell came from behind to stun the Buckeyes and end their undefeated season. During the post-game festivities, Touchdown was let loose in a Cleveland night club and had to be recaptured by the Cleveland Animal Protection League. Her activities earned Touchdown an Associated Press write-up which circulated in hundreds of newspapers across the country.

Touchdown IV was subsequently released into the wild of Pennsylvania, and the Cornell Big Red finished the season 8-0 and ranked fourth in the country.

=== Touchdown costumes ===
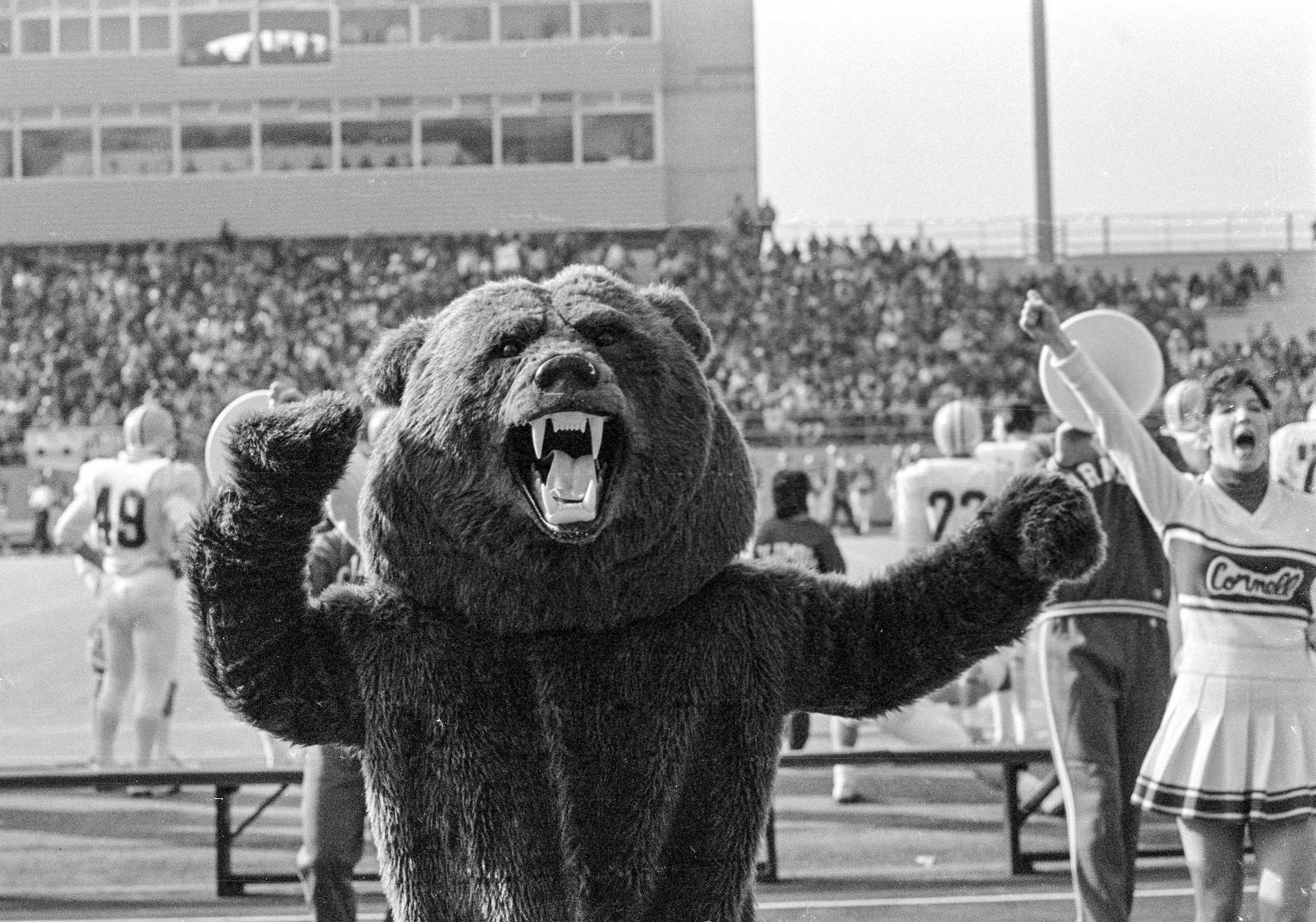
A costumed Touchdown at homecoming in 1987. Note the Schoellkopf West stands behind the mascot, which were demolished in 2016.

Starting in the 1970s, with Cornell student Ron Winarick ’78, the tradition has been for Touchdown to be represented by a student wearing a bear suit.

The Big Red Bears was a student organization throughout the 90s and early 00s. At the time the Mr. & Ms. Bear did not go by Touchdown, that name was reserved for the previous live animals. After a brief hiatus the group reorganized as a student organization in 2005 the to recruit multiple mascots after several years of individual mascots. In 2011, the Cornell Class of 1970 gifted $22,500 to the club with the intention of a $1,000 yearly allowance for cleaning and repairing the suits as well as saving towards new suits. The Class of 1970 president, Connie Ferris Meyer, commented "We felt that the Big Red Bears Gift and Memorial was a lively, fun, and ongoing way to honor the Class of '70, our classmates who have passed on, and the University community." The Big Red Bears acquired their third suit in 2017. The group transitioned to a university-sponsored status in 2021. New suits were purchased in 2022, continuing a trend with the last several iterations of Touchdown to make the character appear friendlier. White backed eyes were also added, bringing the mascot in some ways closer to the version featured in the Cornell Athletics logo.

The costumed Touchdown attends various Cornell events on and off campus. Students audition to wear the bear suit annually. Students may only wear the suit for 30-minute periods at a time, and adopt an exaggerated "bear walk" among other requirements.

== Jerseys and outfits ==
Ever since transitioning to a mascot design, Touchdown has worn a variety of shirts and outfits. In 2021, guidelines were updated so have all Touchdown outfits tie into Cornell in some way. This has and continues to be done through the use of logos, red/white coloring, and iconic Cornell iconography.

Touchdown has uniforms for hockey, football, basketball, and soccer. Some of his most frequently used other outfits include pajamas, a spring vest, and celebration outfit featuring a vest and party hat.

== Touchdown-Mobile ==
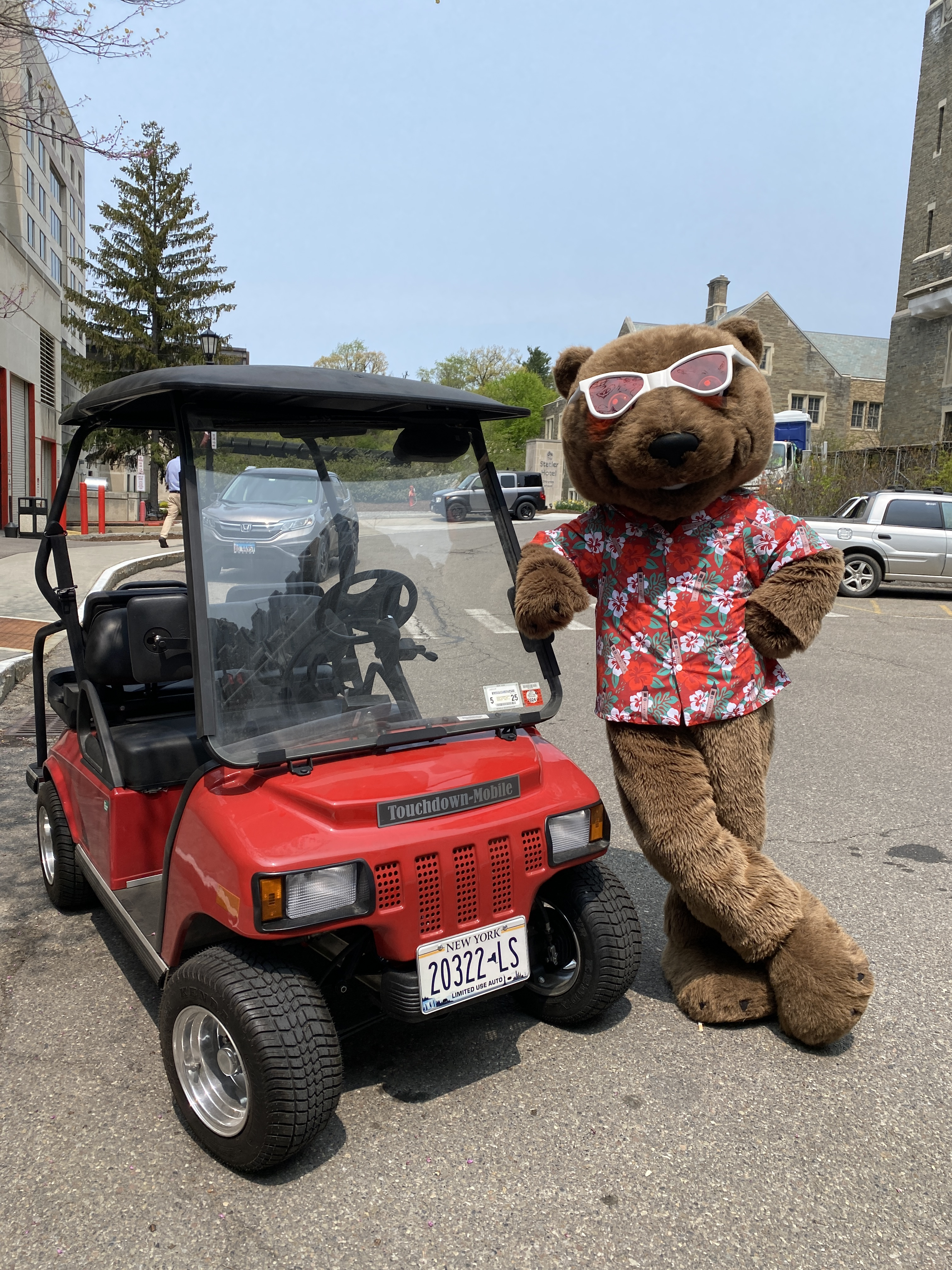
Touchdown with the Touchdown-Mobile at its very first use outside of Statler Hall when Touchdown attended a farewell ice cream truck event.

In 2021, under new leadership, the Big Red Bears sought to bring a new transportation system to campus to increase the efficiency and safety of the Touchdown program. Funds were raised in 2022 and in-combination with pre-existing gifts, a purchase of a street-legal golf cart took place in 2023. The "Touchdown-Mobile" was first used on the final day of classes of the 2023 Spring semester and is now the mascot's primary form of transportation.

== Non-official status ==
In fall of 2011 Geoffrey Block, representative on the Student Assembly, tried to petition to have "Touchdown" recognized as the official mascot at Cornell University. The request was denied.

== Touchdown statue ==
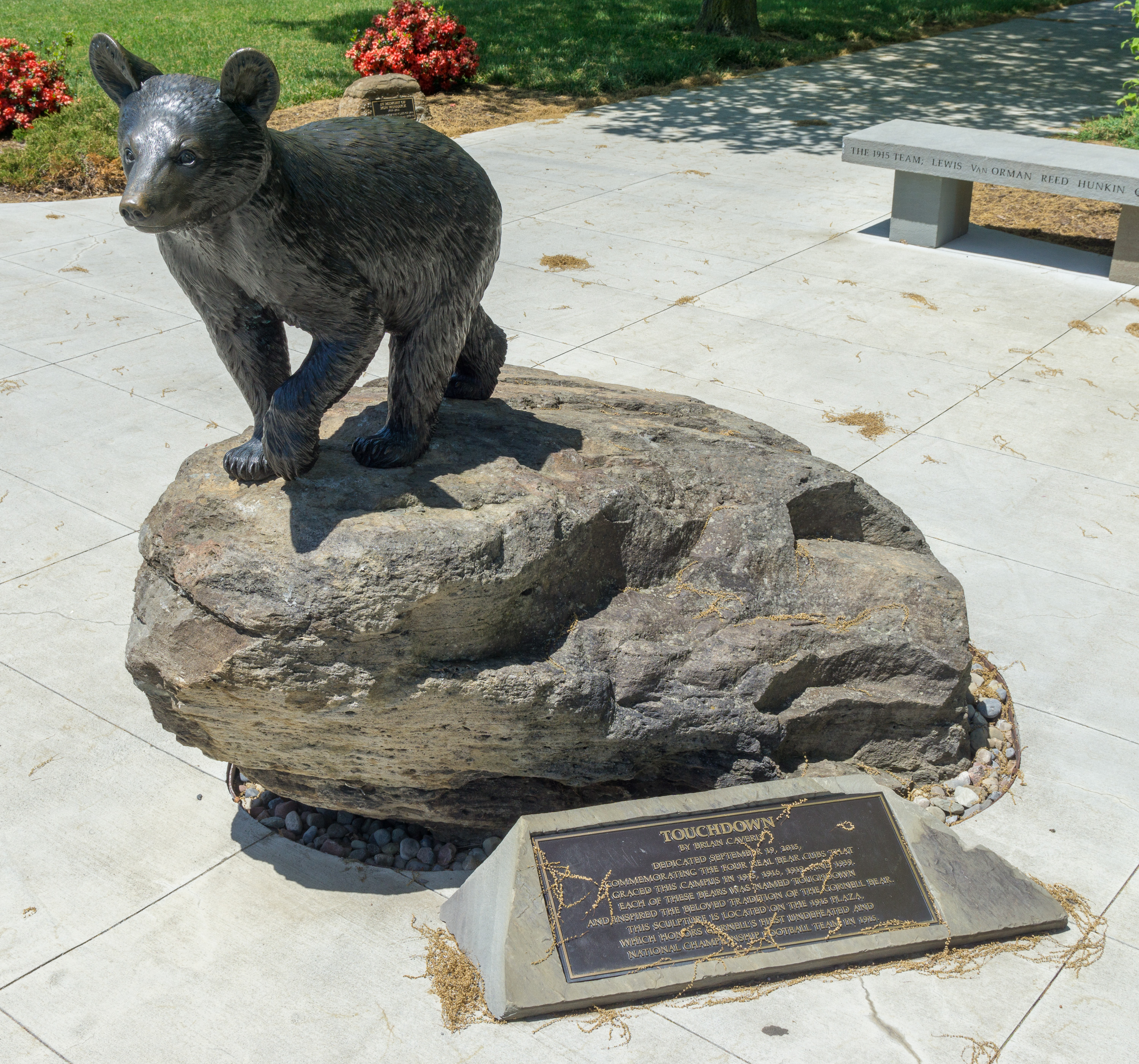
Statue of Touchdown outside Teagle Hall

On May 4, 2006, Alon Yishai Mass ‘08 (Treasurer, Cornell University Class Council of 2008; Member, Student Assembly Appropriations Committee) and Brian Luttrell Hughes ‘07 (President, Mascot, The Big Red Bears) proposed a resolution to the Cornell Student Assembly entitled "R. 33 Resolution Regarding The Creation of a Bear Sculpture Designed to Enhance Pride and Unity on Campus Cornell Student Assembly Minute Notes - May 4, 2006".

The resolution was unanimously passed by the Student Assembly.

Since then, several alumni including John Foote '74, the author of Touchdown: The Story of the Cornell Bear and Joseph Thankhauser have made progression on honoring the lineage of Touchdown by adopting a monumental statue that would highlight all four black bears. University officials supported the idea and the statue was erected outside Teagle Hall near Schoellkopf Field and dedicated prior to the 2015 homecoming game.

== See also ==
- List of individual bears
