= Walter S. Carpenter Jr. =

American corporate executive

Walter S. Carpenter Jr.

Walter Samuel Carpenter Jr. (January 8, 1888 – February 2, 1976) was an American corporate executive from Wilmington, Delaware, who oversaw the DuPont company's involvement in the Manhattan Project to produce an atomic bomb for use during World War II. In 1919, at age 31, Carpenter was the youngest man elected to DuPont's board of directors, and the first who was not from the du Pont family. During his tenure on the board he served as treasurer from 1921 until 1940, as chairman of the finance committee from 1930 until 1940, as president from 1940 until 1948, continued as chairman until 1962, and as honorary chairman until 1974. He also served on the board of directors of General Motors from 1927 until 1959.

Born in Wilkes-Barre, Pennsylvania, to Walter Samuel Carpenter and Isabella Morgan, Carpenter graduated from Wyoming Seminary in 1906 and studied mechanical engineering at Cornell University. He participated in DuPont’s summer programs at Gibbstown and Carneys Point, New Jersey, before dropping out of school his senior year to manage DuPont’s Chilean nitrate interests.

He began working with one of his two brothers, R. R. M. Carpenter, in 1911, helping guide the company’s development of celluloid and dyes. He married Mary Wootten in 1914. Carpenter was responsible for DuPont's 1933 acquisition of Remington Arms and its partnership with IG Farben for producing war supplies.

Carpenter remained involved with Cornell University after he departed, serving on its board of trustees. His donation of $500,000 made the construction of Lynah Rink possible, named after a DuPont coworker and Cornell athletic director James Lynah. Carpenter also donated $1 million for the construction of Carpenter Hall, which houses the engineering library.
