= Asa Smith Bushnell =

Asa Smith Bushnell may refer to:

- Asa S. Bushnell (Governor) (1834–1904), 40th Governor of Ohio
- Asa Smith Bushnell II, son of Asa S. Bushnell (Governor) and father of Asa Smith Bushnell III
- Asa Smith Bushnell III (1900–1975), secretary of the United States Olympic Committee
