= Lynah Rink =

Hockey arena at Cornell University in Ithaca, New York

Coordinates: 42.445783°N 76.477435°W

James Lynah Rink
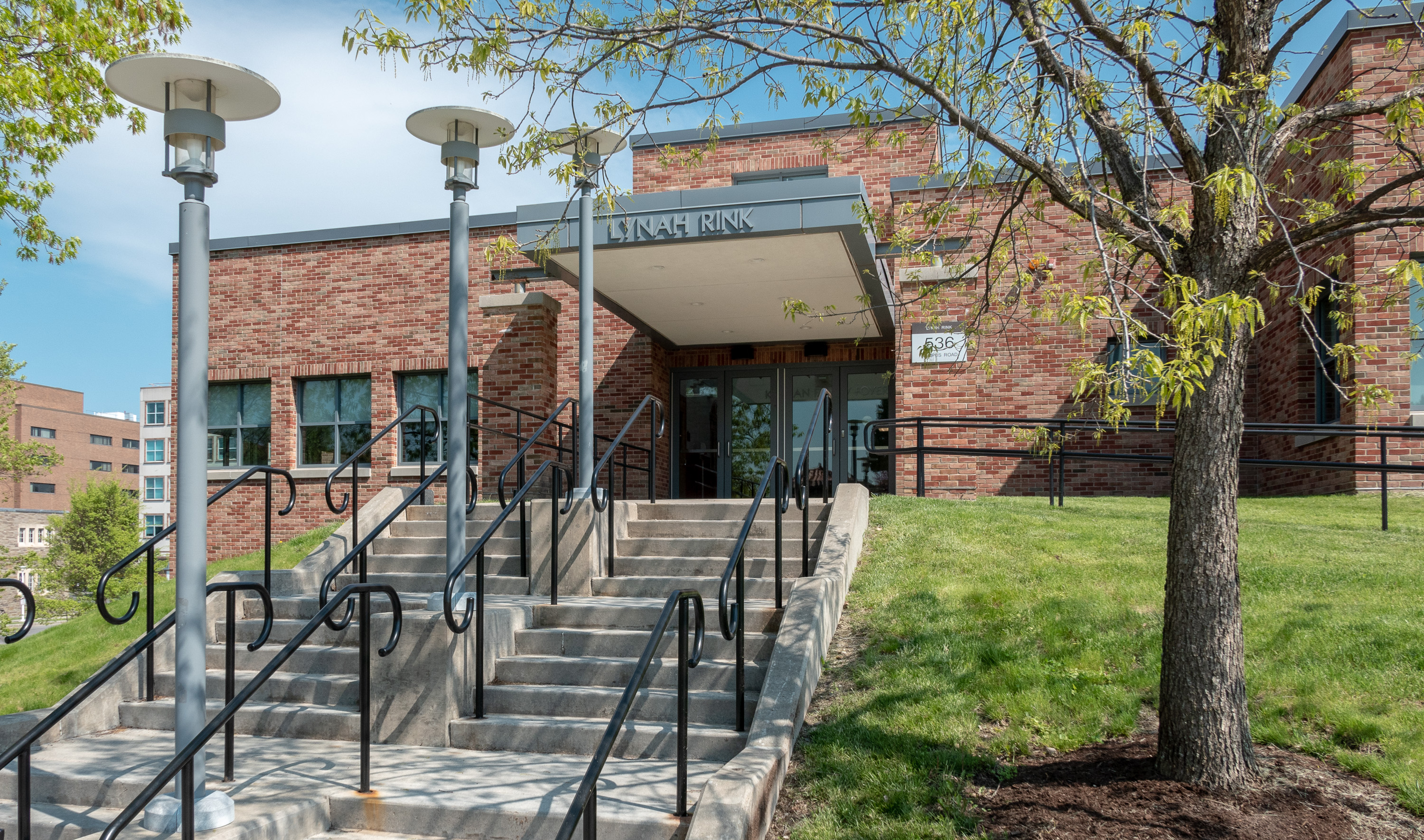
- Exterior
- Interactive map of James Lynah Rink
- Location: Cornell University; Ithaca, NY
- Owner: Cornell University
- Operator: Cornell University
- Capacity: 4,267 (hockey)
- Surface: 200x85 ft (hockey)

Construction
- Groundbreaking: June 5, 1956
- Opened: March 21, 1957
- Expanded: 2007
- Architects: Von Storch, Evans & Burkavage

Tenants
- Cornell Big Red Men's and Women's Ice Hockey

Lynah Rink (pronounced LIE-nuh) is a 4,267-seat hockey arena at Cornell University in Ithaca, New York, that opened in 1957. Named after James Lynah, Class of 1905, who was the director of Cornell athletics from 1935 to 1943, it is home to the Big Red men's and women's ice hockey teams. Lynah has been home to hockey greats such as Ken Dryden, Joe Nieuwendyk, Matt Moulson, Digit Murphy, and Olympic Gold Medalists Rebecca Johnston and Brianne Jenner.

== History ==
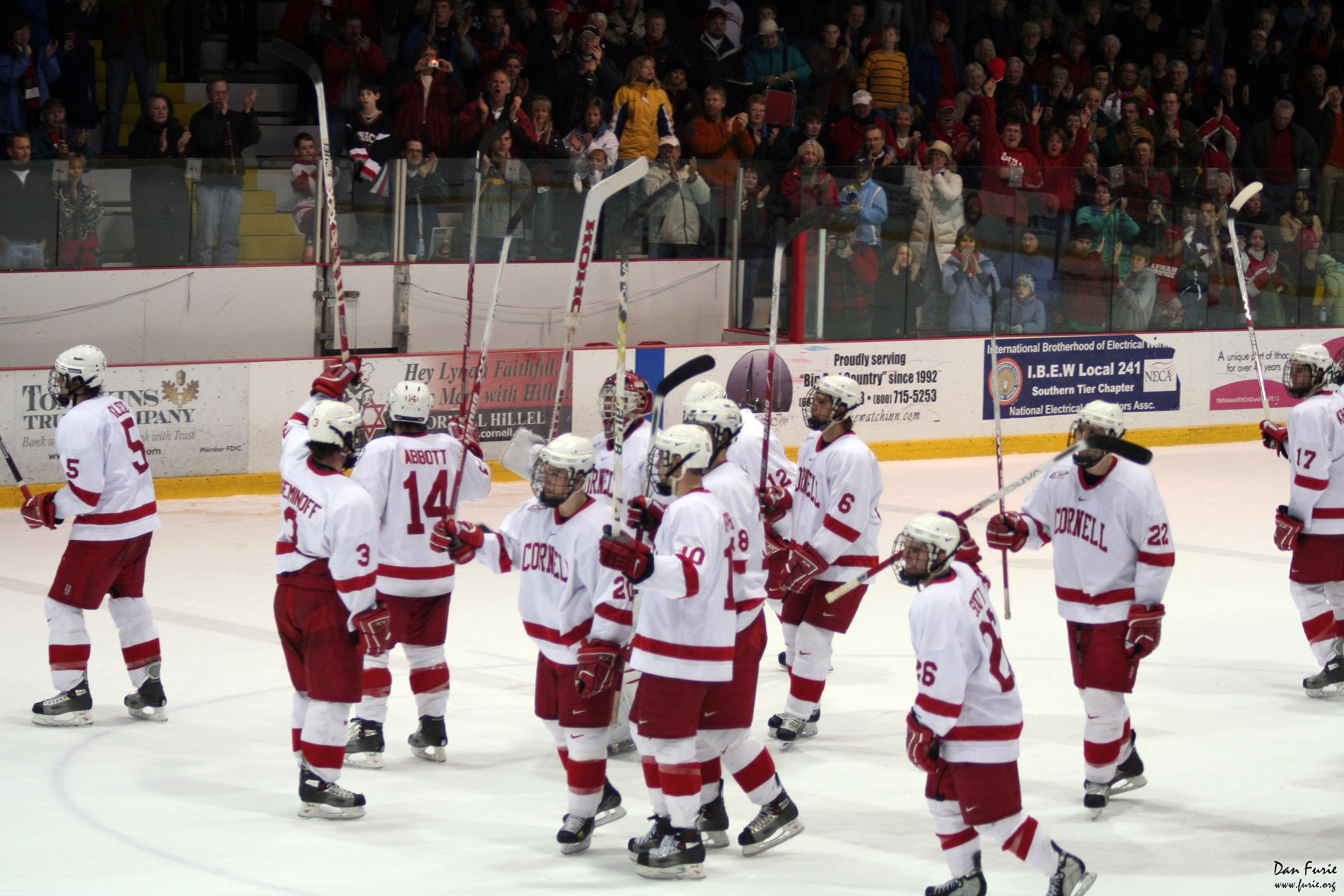
The Cornell Big Red men's ice hockey team doing the Lynah salute

The building is a quonset-shaped structure covered with multi-colored (orange, tan, black, and brown) brick wall cladding set in a common bond pattern. Projecting from the facade of the structure is a one-story rectangular wing flanked on either side by two vertical appendages, which have multi-paned colored glass windows. The one-story wing has a strip of casement windows. The stairway is situated on the west side of the building. A white concrete block structure with wall buttresses connects Lynah Rink to Bartels Hall. It was constructed for $500,000 with a donation from Walter S. Carpenter Jr., chairman and former president of DuPont (and Cornell class of 1910) whose gift came with the stipulation that he did not want his name on the building. The facility was designed by Van Storch, Evans, and Burkavage of Waverly, PA and constructed by Streeter Associates of Elmira, NY.

The rink opened on March 21, 1957 with a match between the New York Rangers (NHL) and the Rochester Americans (AHL) in front of 4200 spectators. It was subsequently dedicated on April 6, 1957 and named the James Lynah Skating Hall,

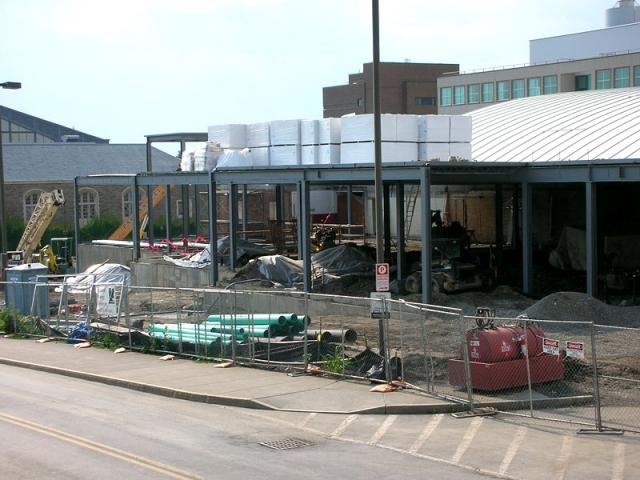
Lynah under renovation, July 2006

In 1995, during a visit by Taiwan's then-president, Lee Teng-hui, PhD ’68, Lynah was stocked with desktop computers and fax machines, and used as a media center for journalists from around the world.

The rink floor and drainage system were renovated in 2000. March 2006 saw a major renovation project to add 19,500 square feet (1,810 m^{2}) to the rink. The additions and renovations included 464 new seats, upgraded locker rooms for both the men's and women's squads and their opponents, trainers' rooms, coaches' offices and a study area for players. A new scoreboard was added as well as preferred seating and a tunnel for the players. The renovation brought total seat capacity to 4,267.

== Lynah Faithful ==
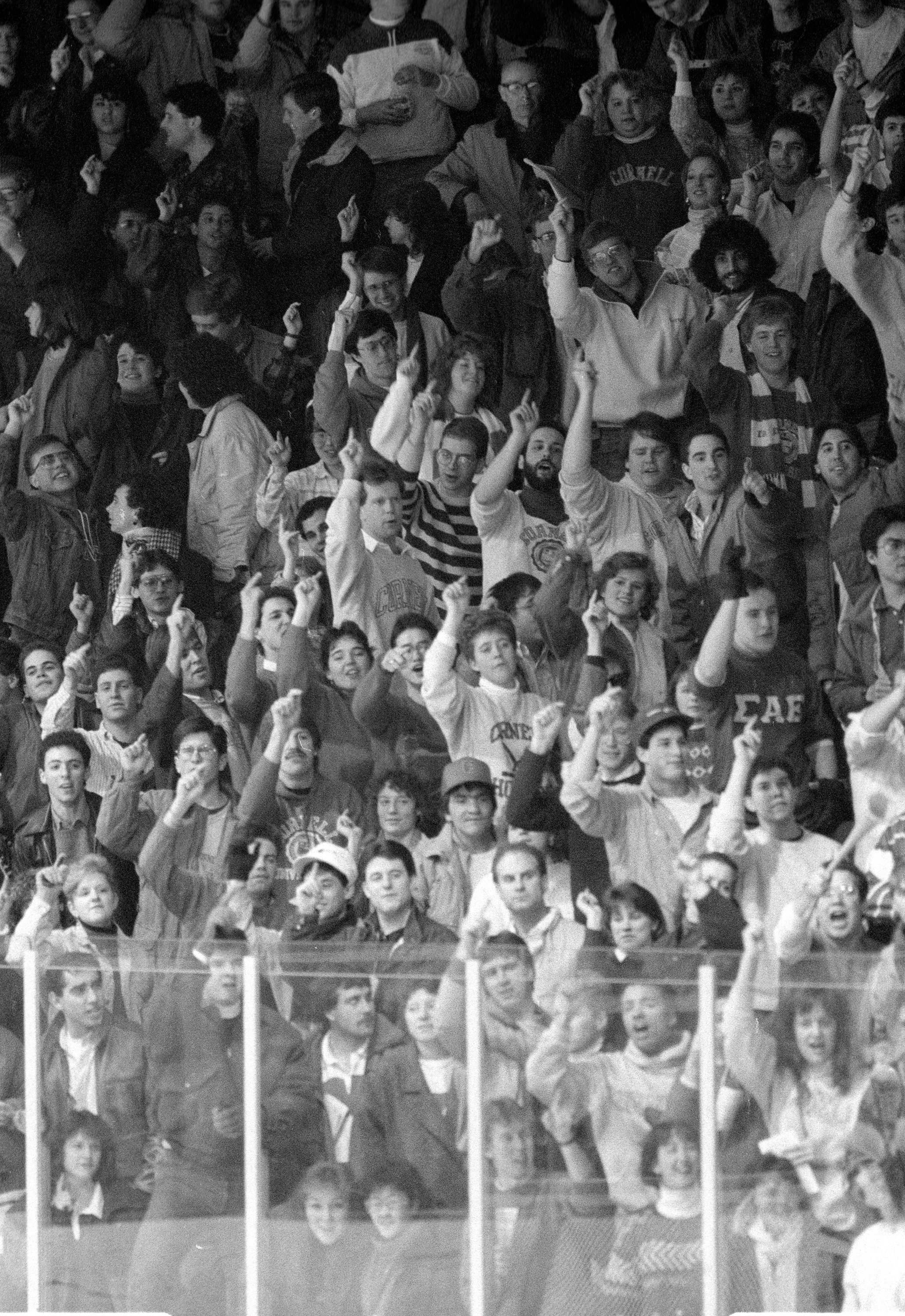
Lynah Faithful in 1987

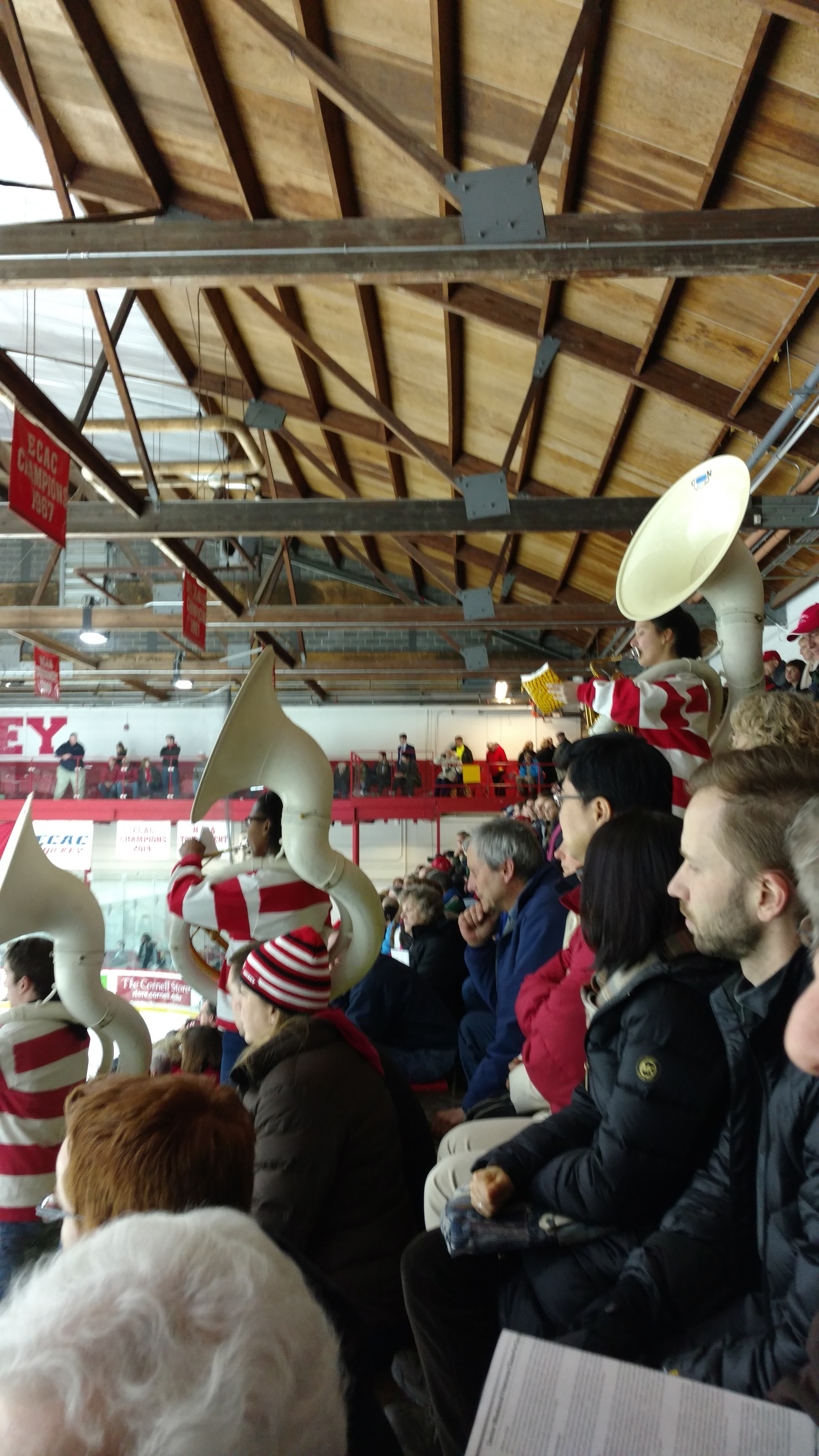
The Pep Band taunts the opposing team with a rendition of Swanee River

Fans of Cornell's Hockey program, aptly named the "Lynah Faithful," are among the loudest and most dedicated fans in the country, making Lynah Rink, many believe, college hockey's most hostile arena. The raucous crowd support gives the Big Red the largest home ice advantage in college hockey, losing under 20% of their games on home ice since Lynah opened in 1957. The Lynah Faithful are cheered on by one cowbell, usually played by a zealous undergraduate, but only during the second and third periods (including overtime) at approximately mid-period. Many of the other regular chants of the Faithful are listed on a website, which serves as a useful primer in the history and traditions of Cornell Hockey when initiating new students into the Lynah Faithful. After the end of all games at Lynah, when the opposing team leaves the ice, the Cornell team gathers at center ice and raises their sticks to salute the faithful as they applaud the team. This is known as the Lynah salute.

Cornell's men's team has had great success at Lynah Rink, closing in on its 500th win on home ice. Its record at Lynah was 15-0-1 during the 2004–05 season, 15-0-0 during the 2002–03 season, and 14-1-1 during the 2001–02 season. Postseason success at Lynah has been equally impressive. Since Lynah Rink hosted its first postseason game in 1966, Cornell's men's team has a postseason record of 38-7-2 in games played there. During the same period they were 14-1 in single elimination games with the sole loss coming against Providence in 1978 and 12-3 in multi-game series.

Cornell has long been criticized for its policies regarding the distribution of season tickets to men's hockey home games. Students often wait in line for nights to get tickets; however, some believe that this is part of the experience of being among Lynah Faithful. It is common to see students wearing T-shirts proudly announcing, "I did my time in the line." In 2005, despite efforts to improve the process over previous years, Cornell was criticized for creating chaos when the Athletic Department announced where students had to go for tickets. In 2006, this was alleviated when the ticket line was preselected at random. During the 2009–10 Hockey season, students did not have to wait in line for season passes given growing concerns over swine flu. Instead the tickets were distributed via a lottery. Beginning in the fall of 2010, Cornell Athletics began distributing tickets via online ticket sales, giving priority to students who had previously purchased season tickets.

== See also ==
- Cornell–Harvard hockey rivalry
- Cornell Big Red
