= 2012 Ivy League Baseball Championship Series =

2012 Ivy League baseball tournament
- Teams: 2
- Format: Best of three series
- Finals site: Hoy Field; Ithaca, New York
- Champions: Cornell (1st title)
- Winning coach: Bill Walkenbach (1st title)

2012 Ivy League baseball standings
	Conf.						Overall
Team	W		L		T	PCT	W		L		T	PCT
Lou Gehrig
Cornell ^{x}‍‍‡‍^{y}	14	–	6	–	0	.700	31	–	17	–	1	.643
Princeton ‍‍‍	13	–	7	–	0	.650	20	–	19	–	0	.513
Columbia ‍‍‍	12	–	8	–	0	.600	21	–	24	–	0	.467
Penn ‍‍‍	8	–	12	–	0	.400	17	–	23	–	0	.425
Red Rolfe
Dartmouth ^{x}‍‍‍	14	–	6	–	0	.700	24	–	18	–	0	.571
Harvard ‍‍‍	8	–	12	–	0	.400	12	–	30	–	0	.286
Brown ‍‍‍	6	–	14	–	0	.300	9	–	35	–	0	.205
Yale ‍‍‍	5	–	15	–	0	.250	13	–	31	–	1	.300
x – Division champion ‡ – Championship Series champion y – Invited to the NCAA tournament As of June 30, 2012; Rankings from Collegiate Baseball

The 2012 Ivy League Baseball Championship Series took place at Hoy Field in Ithaca, NY on May 5 and 6. The series matched the regular season champions of each of the league's two divisions. Cornell, the winner of the series, claimed the Ivy League's automatic berth in the 2012 NCAA Division I baseball tournament.

Cornell won the series, which required all three games, on an 11th inning walk-off home run by Chris Cruz. It was the Big Red's first Ivy League baseball championship since the league began sponsoring baseball in 1993. It was also the first baseball championship for Cornell since 1977, when they claimed the EIBL title.

Dartmouth has appeared in the Ivy League Championship Series every year since 2008, winning in 2009 and 2010.

== Results ==
Game One

May 5, 2012 12:00 pm
Team	1	2	3	4	5	6	7	8	9	R	H	E
Dartmouth	0	0	0	0	0	0	3	0	0	3	6	0
Cornell	1	4	1	1	0	3	1	0	X	11	15	0
WP: Kaufmann LP: Horacek; Home runs: Dartmouth: None; Cornell: Peters; Attendance: 312; Boxscore

Game Two

May 5, 2012 3:02 pm
Team	1	2	3	4	5	6	7	8	9	R	H	E
Cornell	0	0	0	0	0	0	0	0	1	1	6	1
Dartmouth	0	0	0	0	4	1	1	1	X	7	11	0
WP: Hunter LP: Marks; Attendance: 312; Boxscore

Game Three

May 6, 2012 1:00 pm
Team	1	2	3	4	5	6	7	8	9	10	11	R	H	E
Dartmouth	0	0	1	0	0	0	0	0	0	0	0	1	6	0
Cornell	0	0	0	0	0	1	0	0	0	0	2	3	9	1
WP: Urbon LP: Olson; Home runs: Dartmouth: None; Cornell: Cruz; Attendance: 422; Notes: Cornell wins Ivy League Championship; Boxscore
