= James Lynah =

American businessman and sports administrator (1881–1956)

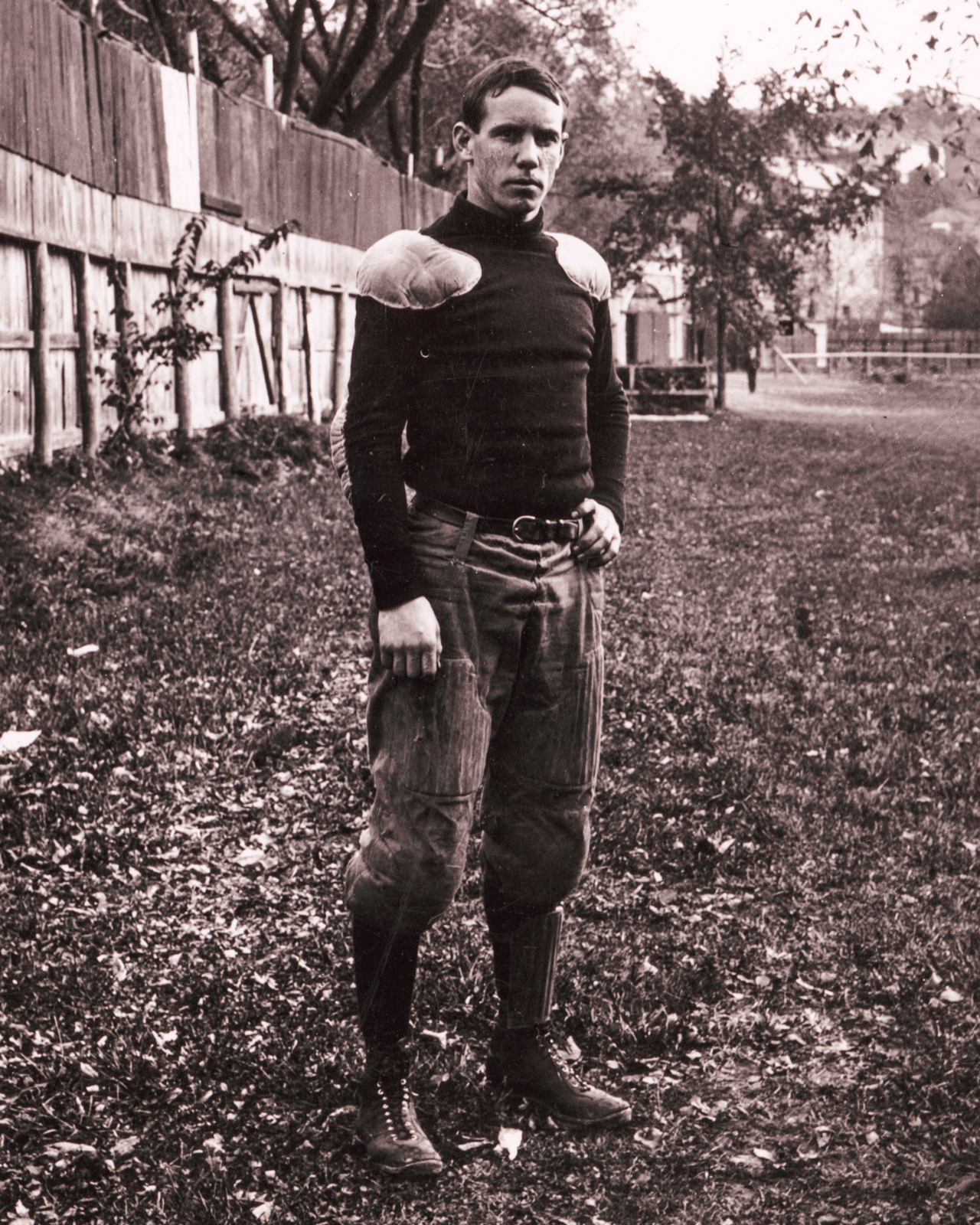
- Lynah with the Cornell football team, c. 1904

Biographical details
- Born: 1881; Charleston, South Carolina, U.S.
- Died: February 24, 1956; South Carolina, U.S.

Playing career
- 1900–1901: Clemson
- 1904: Cornell
- Positions: End, Quarterback

Administrative career (AD unless noted)
- 1935–1944: Cornell

Accomplishments and honors

Awards
- Cornell Hall of Fame

James Lynah (1881 – February 24, 1956) was an American businessman and sports administrator who is considered the principal founder of the Eastern College Athletic Conference. Lynah Rink, an indoor ice hockey rink on the campus of Cornell University, is named in his honor.

== Early life and education ==
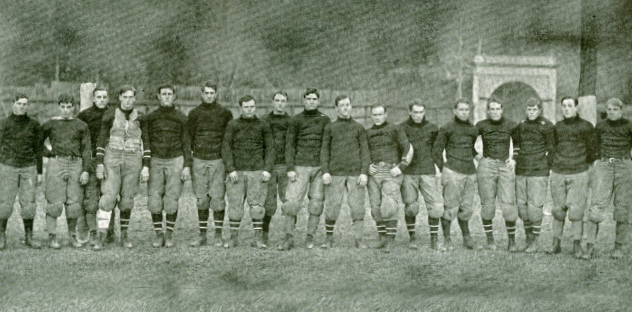
The 1904 Cornell Big Red football team; Lynah is second from the right

Born in Charleston, South Carolina, in 1881, Lynah transferred from Clemson University to graduate from Cornell University, where he was a member of the Quill and Dagger society and Sigma Phi and graduated in 1905. He played for both coach John Heisman and Pop Warner. Joe Guyon is the only other known player who can make a similar claim. Lynah was an end for Heisman's 1900 and 1901 Clemson teams, and he was captain and quarterback for Warner's 1904 Cornell team.

== Career ==
After graduation, Lynah worked for DuPont for fifteen years, becoming a plant manager during World War I. He went on to work at General Motors from 1922 to 1929, serving as director of purchasing and manufacturing staff.

== Cornell athletics ==
An active alumnus of Cornell University, he was involved in many alumni committees, was chairman of a committee for the development of the College of Engineering and was a member of the College of Engineering Council.

He succeeded graduate manager of athletics Romeyn Berry as the first director of athletics at Cornell University from 1935 to 1943. While serving as athletic director, Lynah led the movement to establish an athletic conference in the eastern United States. His efforts led to the creation of the Eastern Intercollegiate Athletics agency, which became the modern ECAC. Lynah was succeeded at Cornell by Robert Kane. He was one of the inaugural members of the Cornell University Athletic Hall of Fame.

== After Cornell ==
Lynah left his position at Cornell on indefinite leave to serve as assistant director of the ammunition and light ordnance division of the National Defense Advisory Committee in Washington. He was also a member of the American Association for the Advancement of Science, American Academy of Political and Social Science, and American Society of Mechanical Engineers.

He chaired the NCAA committee on recruitment beginning in 1944.

== Death and legacy ==
Lynah died in South Carolina on February 24, 1956.

The ECAC created the James Lynah Distinguished Achievement Award in 1957 to recognize outstanding athletic administrators. Previous winners include Asa Bushnell (1959), Thomas J. Hamilton (1976) and Robert Kane (1977).
