= Asa Smith Bushnell III =

American sports executive (1900–1975)

Asa Smith Bushnell III (February 2, 1900 – March 22, 1975) was the first commissioner (initially titled executive director) of the Eastern College Athletic Conference, serving from 1938 to 1970, and was board member (1945 to 1970) and secretary of the United States Olympic Committee, editing, co-editing and/or writing "Olympic Books" at least from 1948 to 65. He graduated from Princeton University in 1921, and a prize in his name is awarded to the Ivy League football player of the year.

Bushnell was not an athlete himself, and in college another of his interests was expressed in his editorship of the college humor magazine, The Tiger. In this role, he chose to reject submissions from recent alumnus F. Scott Fitzgerald 1917, "one of his few missteps" according to a later alumni magazine profile, which also said he nonetheless became a friend of Fitzgerald's. Bushnell also edited the alumni magazine for five years (1925–1930) before moving full-time to athletic administration.

== Biography ==
Bushnell was born on February 12, 1900. He won the James Lynah Distinguished Achievement Award from the ECAC in 1959 as an outstanding athletic administrator. He died on March 22, 1975.
