= Romeyn Berry =

University sports administrator

Romeyn Berry (1881–1957) was an American sports administrator and author.

Nicknamed "Rym," Berry attended Cornell University, graduating in 1904 and earning a law degree in 1906. During his senior year, Berry was elected to the Sphinx Head Society and editor of the Cornell Widow with George Jean Nathan as business manager. In 1905, Berry composed the lyrics for the Cornell song The Big Red Team, thereby dubbing Cornell athletics "The Big Red." From 1906 to 1919, Berry practiced law in New York City. During World War I, he served as a first lieutenant in the U.S. Army. Leaving his law practice, Berry became the Graduate Director of Cornell Athletics from 1919 to 1935. During these years, Berry also served as graduate manager of the Cornell University Glee Club. In 1932, he was president of the Eastern Collegiate Baseball League, and he was named to the American Olympic Committee in 1938. Berry was succeeded as athletic director by James Lynah.

Around 1936, he moved to a 65-acre farm known as "Stoneposts" in Jacksonville, New York, about 10 miles from Ithaca. His first wife was Olive Nutting, whose father, Captain Lee Nutting, had won the Medal of Honor in the Civil War. His second wife was Hester Bancroft who was a sculptor and painter.

Well known among Cornell alumni for his wit, Berry contributed to the Cornell Alumni News, The Ithaca Journal, The New Yorker, The American Agriculturalist, and Cornell football game programs. He also authored Dirt Roads to Stoneposts (1949), Stoneposts in the Sunset (1950), and Behind the Ivy (1950). His pieces for the Ithaca Journal ran under the heading "State and Tioga" from 1931 to 1956 and reflected his gentle humor and wry observations about rural life and human nature.

He was inducted into the Cornell Athletic Hall of Fame in 1980.
