= Robert Kane (sports administrator) =

American athletic director

Robert James Kane (April 24, 1911 – May 31, 1992) was a sports administrator at Cornell University and president of the United States Olympic Committee.

== Biography ==
Kane attended Ithaca High School and Cornell University, where he established himself as a sprinter. As a senior at Cornell, he was elected to the Sphinx Head Society.

In 1936, Kane was the manager of the U.S. Olympic track team. He became Acting Director of Cornell Athletics from 1941 to 1944 and then served as the Director of Cornell Athletics from 1944 to 1971, succeeding James Lynah. Kane served as the Dean of Physical Education and Athletics before from 1971 to 1976. Kane was also a leader of national and international influence who capped three decades in the Olympic movement as president of the United States Olympic Committee from 1977 to 1980. He founded the National Sports Festival, later renamed the U.S. Olympic Festival. Kane received the Olympic Order in silver in 1982 and was inducted into the U.S. Olympic Hall of Fame in 1986.

Kane is also the author of Good Sports: A History of Cornell Athletics.

== Honors ==
The Robert J. Kane Sports Complex at Cornell University was completed in 1996 and dedicated in 1997. The complex includes an eight-lane, 400-meter synthetic track oval running track, a soccer pitch, and throwing fields.

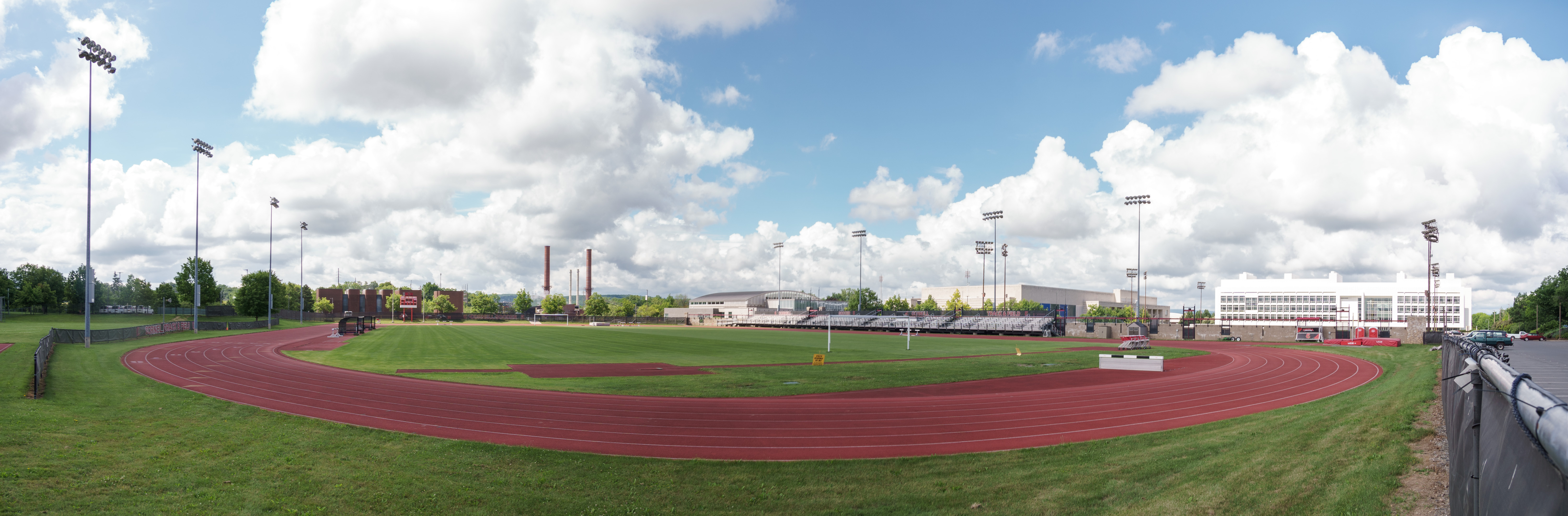
Robert J. Kane Sports Complex, viewed from the Tower Road parking lot.
