= Robert Trent Jones Golf Course =

Golf course in Ithaca, New York

Robert Trent Jones Golf Course At Cornell University
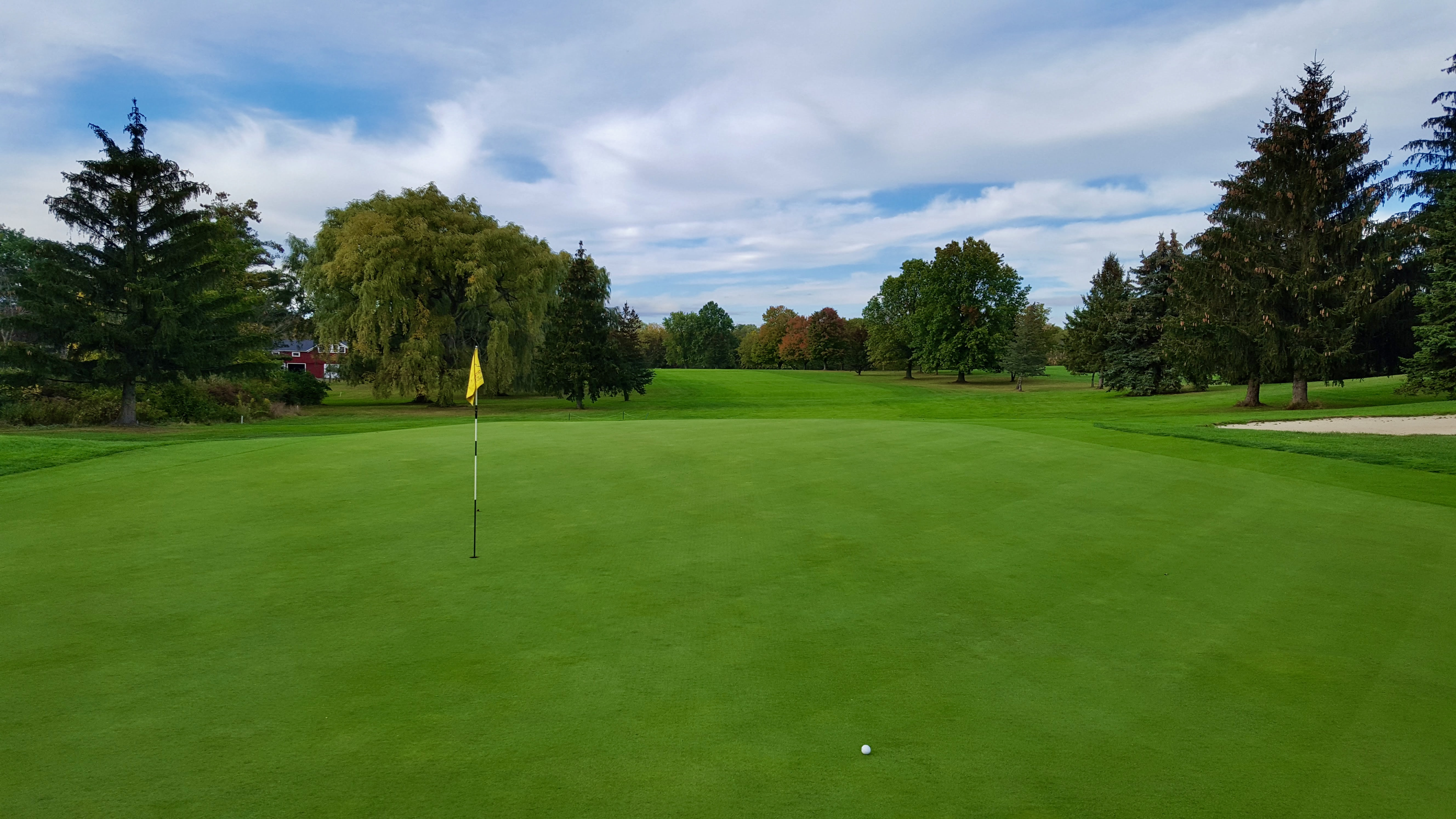
- Interactive map of Robert Trent Jones Golf Course At Cornell University
- 42°27′36″N 76°28′11″W

Club information
- Location: 313 Warren Road, Ithaca, New York State
- Established: 1941
- Type: private, academic
- Owner: Cornell University
- Operator: Cornell University
- Tota holes: 18
- Designed by: Robert Trent Jones
- Par: 72
- Length: 6890 yards
- Course rating: 73.2
- Slope rating: 139

The Robert Trent Jones Golf Course is Cornell University's golf course. Designed by Cornell alumnus Robert Trent Jones and located northeast of North Campus in Ithaca, New York, the first half of the 18 hole course was opened in 1941, and the other 9 holes were added in 1954.

It has been described as "the finest of Jones’s Finger Lakes offerings".

The golf course hosts local and regional tournaments, Ivy League games, the New York State high school boys' annual golf championships and acts as a home course for Cornell's men's golf team.
