= Hoy Field =

Baseball field at Cornell University, US

David F. Hoy Field
- Hoy Field
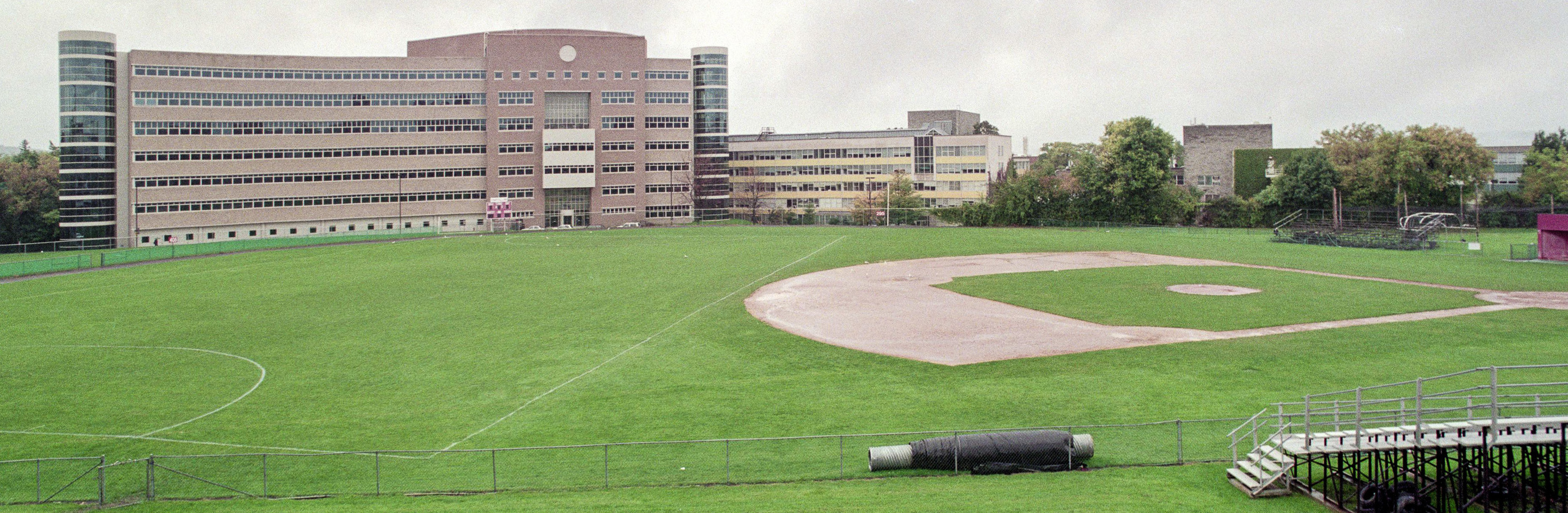
- Hoy Field in 1994, with Rhodes Hall in distance
- Interactive map of David F. Hoy Field
- Location: Cornell Central Campus, Ithaca, New York, U.S.
- Coordinates: 42.444685°N 76.480185°W
- Owner: Cornell University
- Capacity: 500 (grandstand); 1,000 (total)
- Surface: FieldTurf
- Field size: Left Field: 315 ft (96.01 m); Left Center Field: 378 ft (115.21 m); Center Field: 405 ft (123.44 m); Right Center Field: 375 (114.3 m); Right Field: 325 ft (99.06 m)

Construction
- Opened: 1922
- Renovated: 2007
- Closed: 2023
- Demolished: 2023

Tenant
- Cornell Big Red (NCAA) (1922–2023)

David F. Hoy Field, usually referred to simply as Hoy Field, was a baseball field at Cornell University in Ithaca, New York. It was home to the Big Red baseball team from 1922 to 2022, when the team moved to a newly constructed facility east of campus, Booth Field. The former Hoy Field was demolished in 2023 to make way for a new building for the Ann S. Bowers College of Computing and Information Science.

== Description ==
Hoy Field was located just west of Schoellkopf Field and east of the Engineering Quad on the southern end of Cornell's central campus. The dimensions of the field from home plate to the outfield fence were 315 feet in left field, 405 feet in center field, and 325 feet in right field. Seating capacity was about 500.

Predating the field itself was Bacon Cage, an indoor batting cage between Hoy Field and Schoellkopf Stadium. According to university historian Corey Earle, it was dedicated to George W. Bacon, an 1892 Cornell graduate who had helped lead efforts to build the university's athletic complex. Bacon Cage was also used as an indoor golf driving range. In 1985, it was demolished to make way for the Hoy Parking Garage.

Hoy Field also had batting facilities dedicated in memory of Kerry Brooks, a 1990 graduate of Cornell and a former "Big Red" co-captain.

== History ==
=== Percy Field ===
Percy Field

Cornell's previous baseball field was Percy Field, which stood at the current location of Ithaca High School from the 1890s until 1922. The metal bleachers from Percy Field were preserved and moved to the new baseball field.

=== David F. Hoy ===
The new baseball field was built at the urging of David "Davy" Hoy. Hoy, an alumnus and university registrar since 1894, had served the university's baseball advisor for thirty years, and traveled south with the team for spring training each year. The new field was dedicated April 22, 1922 with a parade and band concert. Hoy threw out the first pitch on the field; the ball he used is preserved in the Kroch Library collections. The field was named in honor of Hoy in October 1923.

Hoy was injured in a 1929 bus accident in Virginia while riding with the baseball team, and he died December 6, 1930 "of heart disease and other complications" at age 67. Cornell's fight song, Give My Regards to Davy references "Davy" Hoy prominently.

=== Notable events ===
On April 21, 1923, Columbia pitcher Lou Gehrig struck out ten Big Red players and hit a "legendary" home run, which may be the longest home run in Hoy Field history. A 2015 analysis suggests that Gehrig's home run was "the equivalent of hitting a home run either to the top of Rhodes Hall, or over it into the woods behind it."

In 1947 it was proposed that the School of Industrial and Labor Relations be housed in a new building that would be built partly over the field, but protests from students and alumni blocked the project.

The facility was given a $3.25 million renovation in 2006. The playing field was re-oriented so that home plate, which had faced south, would face southwest, and the grass surface was replaced with artificial turf, FieldTurf, which was hoped would reduce maintenance costs and increase the field's availability for practice time in the early spring.

In 2012, the field hosted the 2012 Ivy League Baseball Championship Series, in which Cornell defeated Dartmouth two games to one.

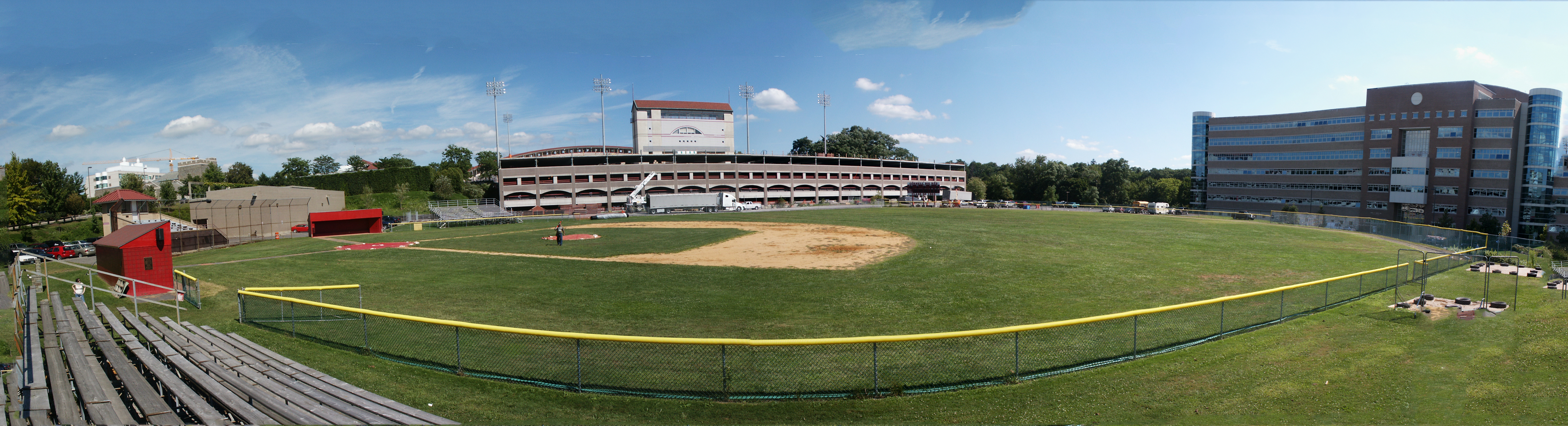
Panorama of Hoy Field pre-2007 renovation in August 2006.

=== Replacement ===
The 2008 Campus Master Plan called for the relocation of Hoy Field in anticipation of future construction. Groundbreaking on a new building for the Bowers CIS school was held in October 2022 in the space formerly occupied by Hoy Field. The building is expected to be completed in 2025.

The baseball field and several other athletic facilities would be moved to the edge of the Ithaca campus, off Game Farm Road in the Town of Ithaca. The 160-acre site would be near existing facilities including the Reis Tennis Center, Oxley Equestrian Center, and the Robinson Softball Complex, and adjacent to the McGovern Athletics Complex. The new facility would retain Hoy Field's capacity while adding lighting as well as a support building which would include new locker rooms, batting cages, and a press box. The Town of Ithaca approved the plans and construction began in 2022.

The new field is named after longtime donor Rich Booth, a 1982 graduate and former pitcher, who had earlier endowed Cornell's head baseball coaching position in memory of coach Ted Thoren. Booth Field was officially dedicated April 22, 2023 and the first game was played there the same day, against Princeton.

== See also ==
- List of NCAA Division I baseball venues
