= E. H. Nichols =

American surgeon and college coach

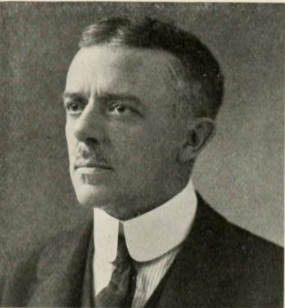

Biographical details
- Born: January 6, 1864; Reading, Massachusetts, U.S.
- Died: June 12, 1922 (aged 58); Boston, Massachusetts, U.S.
- Education: Harvard College; Harvard Medical School

Playing career
- 1886–1889: Harvard

Coaching career (HC unless noted)
- 1900–1901: Harvard
- 1905: Harvard

Head coaching record
- Overall: 53–13–1
- Military career
- Burial place: Cremated
- Allegiance: United States of America
- Branch: British Army; United States Army
- Service years: 1915, 1917–1919
- Rank: Lieutenant colonel
- Units: Harvard Surgical Unit; American Base Hospital No. 7

Edward Hall Nichols (January 6, 1864 – June 12, 1922) was an American surgeon known for his long association with Harvard University. He was the first chief surgeon of the Harvard Surgical Unit during World War I and was a coach and advisor for Harvard's sports teams.

== Early life ==
Nichols was born in Reading, Massachusetts, on January 6, 1864, to Edward Childs and Abbie Susan (Hall) Nichols. He prepared for college at the Boston Latin School. He graduated from Harvard College in 1886 and Harvard Medical School in 1892. He spent four seasons as a pitcher on the Harvard Crimson baseball team and set the school record for strikeouts in a game with fourteen. On October 3, 1894, he married Edith Walker Judd in Cambridge, Massachusetts. They had two children – Hall and Edith.

== Medicine ==
After graduating from Harvard Medical School, Nichols became a surgical house officer at the Boston City Hospital. He then spent two years as the executive assistant at the hospital. In 1897, he was made Boston City Hospital's surgeon to outpatients. He continued to receive promotions, rising to the position of chief of service.

On June 8, 1896, Nichols returned to Harvard as an assistant in pathology at the Harvard Medical School. From 1897 to 1901, he was a demonstrator of surgical pathology. He then served as an instructor in surgical pathology until June 6, 1904, when he was promoted to assistant professor. He was appointed an associate professor of surgery in 1913 and became a clinical professor of surgery in 1916.

In 1899, Nichols was chosen to lead the Harvard Cancer Commission, which was created after Caroline Brewer Croft willed $100,000 to Harvard to study cancer. He resigned from the commission in 1905 because he wanted to leave pathology and return to surgery. In his final report, Nichols wrote that cancer was not contagious, hereditary, or bacterial and that the best cure was "early and radical operation".

In 1913, Nichols was elected to the American Academy of Arts and Sciences.

== Athletics ==
In December 1899, Nichols was appointed head coach of the Harvard baseball team. He implemented a system of play that led to the Crimson winning their annual series against Yale in seven consecutive seasons. He declined reappointment in 1902 to focus on his medical duties, but continued to serve as an advisor to the team. In 1905, he was made supervisor of the Harvard baseball team, overseeing field coach Thomas F. Murphy. According to The New York Times, the unique arrangement came about because captain C. Walter Randall was unable to find anyone to coach the team after the previous year's coach, Orville Frantz, declined to return for another season. Harvard went 19–5–1 under Nichols and Murphy. Harvard credits the 1900 and 1901 seasons to Nichols and the 1905 season to both Nichols and Murphy, giving Nichols a career coaching record of 53–13–1.

Nichols served on the Harvard Athletic Committee, first as an alumni representative, then as a faculty representative. He was also a longtime member of the baseball advisory committee and was the surgeon in charge of the Harvard Crimson football team for twenty years. In 1967, he was inducted into the inaugural class of the Harvard Varsity Club Hall of Fame.

== World War I ==
In May 1915, Nichols was tasked with organizing a medical unit consisting of Harvard Medical School personnel that would staff a hospital in England or France. He, along with a staff of 32 surgeons, 75 nurses, and a business manager served with the British Army in France for four months.

Following the American entry into World War I, Nichols joined the United States Army. He was given the rank of Major and was made chief surgeon of American Base Hospital No. 7. The unit was organized at the Boston City Hospital, mobilized at Fort Devens, and sailed for Europe in July 1917. In December 1918, he was promoted to Lieutenant colonel. He returned to the United States in January 1919 and was cited by General John J. Pershing "for exceptionally meritorious and conspicuous service at Base Hospital No. 7, Joue-les-Tours, France".

== Death ==
On June 6, 1922, Nichols fell ill shortly after performing surgery. After recovering in a rest room, he was able to return home. He died on June 12, 1922 at his home in Boston.
