= American Base Hospital No. 7 =

Geography
- Location: Joue-les-Tours, Centre-Val de Loire, France

Organisation
- Type: Military

Services
- Beds: 2,600

History
- Founded: 1916
- Closed: 1919

American Base Hospital No. 7 was an American military hospital organized at Boston City Hospital. It was one of the original base hospitals organized by the American Red Cross during World War I. The hospital moved to Joue-les-Tours, France in 1918 and treated patients until January 17, 1919.

== Organization ==
Many Americans began preparing for the entry into the First World War prior to the country's formal engagement in hostilities, notably in the formation of hospitals under the auspices of the Red Cross. On February 18, 1916, Col. Jefferson Randolph Kean of the United States Army Medical Corps was detailed to the American Red Cross to organized field hospital units. On February 22, 1916, he visited Boston and proposed that three hospitals be organized around the three major hospitals of the city: Massachusetts General Hospital, Boston City Hospital, and Brigham Hospital (now Brigham and Women's Hospital). The Massachusetts General and City Hospital units were organized as planned, but a compromise was reached where Harvard Medical School and all its affiliated hospitals would form a unit instead of Brigham alone.

The City Hospital unit was organized in December 1916. It was directed by City Hospital's superintendent, Dr. John J. Dowling. Dr. E. H. Nichols, who had previously served with the Harvard Surgical Unit, was given the rank of Major and was made chief surgeon. It was ready for active service on July 1, 1917 and left for Camp Devens on February 25, 1918. American Base Hospital No. 7 remained in training until July 6, 1918, when it left Camp Devens for New York City. On July 8, 1918, the unit sailed aboard the USS Leviathan for France. American Base Hospital No. 7 arrived in Brest, France on July 15, 1918. After spending two weeks there, it was ordered to Joue-les-Tours for station. The unit consisted of 26 officers, 153 enlisted men, 100 nurses, and 6 civilian employees. Colonel A. M. Smith was the hospital's commanding officer, E. H. Nichols, who was promoted from Major to Lieutenant colonel in December 1918, was the chief of surgical service, and Major John J. Thomas was the chief of medical service. Emma N. Nichols led the nursing unit of Base Hospital No. 7.

== Facilities ==
Base Hospital No. 7 occupied one type A unit, constructed by the United States Army Corps of Engineers. The original hospital contained 1,000 beds. A second building with another 1,000 beds was later constructed. Another 600 beds were added thereafter, bringing the hospital's total capacity to 2,600.

== Operations ==
Base Hospital No. 7 received its first patients on August 18, 1918. It treated soldiers who had been evacuated from front line hospitals and treated a number of amputation, gas, influenza, and pneumonia cases as well. In total, Base Hospital No. 7 received 3,518 surgical and medical cases during its lifetime.

== Demobilization ==
On January 17, 1919, Base Hospital No. 7 was relieved by Base Hospital No. 120. On March 14, 1919, most of the personnel of Base Hospital No. 7 left Saint-Nazaire, on the USS Manchuria and arrived at Camp Merritt, New Jersey on March 24, 1919. Due to a lack of space aboard the Manchuria, a group of Base Hospital No. 7's officers, including Lieut. Col. John J. Dowling, were unable to accompany the rest of the unit and left Saint-Nazaire on March 12 on the USS Tivives. They arrived in Hoboken, New Jersey on March 27, 1919 and rejoined the unit in Camp Merritt. On April 1, 1919, 139 enlisted members and two officers of Base Hospital No. 7 arrived at Camp Devens. The unit was mustered out of the service on April 14, 1919.
