= Alex Nahigian =

American football and baseball player and coach (1919–2001)

Biographical details
- Born: April 3, 1919; Cambridge, Massachusetts, U.S.
- Died: July 30, 2001 (aged 82); Cranston, Rhode Island, U.S.
- Education: College of the Holy Cross '42

Playing career

Football
- 1938–1941: Holy Cross

Baseball
- 1939-1942: Holy Cross
- Positions: Halfback (football); Outfielder (baseball)

Coaching career (HC unless noted)

Football
- 1949–1972: Brown (asst.)
- 1973–1975: Harvard (asst.)
- 1978–1981: Harvard (asst.)

Baseball
- 1960–1978: Providence
- 1979–1990: Harvard

Head coaching record
- Overall: 470-325-5
- Tournaments: NCAA: 9-18

Accomplishments and honors

Championships
- EIBL: 1980, 1983, 1984

Awards
- New England Coach of the Year: 1973, 1983, 1984, 1985; Rhode Island Words Unlimited Coach of the Year: 1970; Providence Athletic Hall of Fame (Inducted 2007)

Alex Nahigian (April 3, 1919 – July 30, 2001) was an American college baseball and football player and coach. He was the head baseball coach at Providence (1960–1978) and Harvard (1979–1990), making a total of nine NCAA tournament appearances between the two schools. He also served as an assistant football coach at Brown and Harvard.

== Early life ==
Nahigian was born on April 3, 1919. Nahigian came from an Armenian background but was born in Cambridge, Massachusetts. He attended both Medford High School in Medford, Massachusetts and St. John's Prep in Danvers, Massachusetts.

== Playing career ==
Nahigian played football and baseball at the College of the Holy Cross in Worcester, Massachusetts. An injury prevented him from playing football past his sophomore season, but he played baseball for College Baseball Hall of Fame coach Jack Barry all four years, captaining the team his senior year.

After graduating in 1942, Nahigian worked as a teacher and a high school baseball and football coach in Rhode Island. He also played three seasons of minor league baseball from 1946 to 1948, appearing in the Class B New England League with the Pawtucket Slaters, Portland Pilots, and Providence Grays.

== Coaching career ==
=== Football ===
After his baseball playing career was over, Nahigian started his collegiate coaching career as a football coach. He was an assistant at Brown from 1949 to 1972. He also served two stints as an assistant at Harvard, 1973–1975 and 1978–1981.

=== Baseball ===
==== Providence ====
Nahigian was a successful high school baseball coach in Rhode Island in the 1940s and 1950s, and he was chosen to succeed Robert Murray as Providence's head coach for the start of the 1960 season. Providence then competed as an independent in the NCAA's District 1, which encompassed New England.

In his fourth season, 1963, he led Providence to the program's first NCAA tournament. At the District 1 Regional, the Friars defeated Connecticut in the opening three-game series but fell to Holy Cross in the regional final.

In his 19-year tenure at Providence, Nahigian led the Friars to five more NCAA tournaments and had an overall record of 221-173-2. His best season at Providence was 1973, when the team went 23-6-1 and appeared in its 5th NCAA tournament. At the District 1 Regional, the team dropped its opening game to Northeastern. It recovered in the losers bracket to beat Massachusetts and Northeastern to reach the regional final. There, it lost to Harvard, 8-1. Nahigian was named the 1973 New England Coach of the Year.

==== Harvard ====
Nahigian replaced Loyal Park as Harvard's head baseball coach for the start of the 1979 season. Nahigian was a Cambridge native, attended high school near Boston, and had served as an assistant football coach at Harvard from 1973 to 1975. He was the unanimous selection of Harvard's search committee, largely due to his success at Providence. Nahigian spent 12 seasons at Harvard, leading the Crimson to three NCAA tournaments.

The Crimson's three NCAA tournament appearances came at the Northeast Regional in 1980, 1983, and 1984 after it won the EIBL title in each of those seasons. The program reached regional finals in 1980 (6-3 loss to St. John's) and 1983 (4-3 loss to Maine). In 1985, Harvard shared the EIBL title with Princeton but was defeated in a playoff and did not reach the NCAA tournament. In 1990, Nahigian's final season, Harvard participated in the first Baseball Beanpot, finishing as the runner-up to Boston College.

Nahigian was named the New England Coach of the Year in 1983, 1984, and 1985. In 1989, he received the Jack Butterfield Award.

== Head coaching record ==
Below is a table of Nahigian's yearly records as a collegiate head baseball coach.

Record table
Season	Team	Overall	Conference	Standing	Postseason
Providence (Independent) (1960–1978)
1960	Providence	6–7			
1961	Providence	7–5			
1962	Providence	7–8			
1963	Providence	10–5			NCAA Regional
1964	Providence	13–9			
1965	Providence	12–5			
1966	Providence	6–15			
1967	Providence	7–6			
1968	Providence	11–5			NCAA Regional
1969	Providence	9–7			
1970	Providence	11–9			NCAA Regional
1971	Providence	5v14			
1972	Providence	13–9			NCAA Regional
1973	Providence	23–6–1			NCAA Regional
1974	Providence	17–9			NCAA Regional
1975	Providence	21–9			
1976	Providence	13–16			
1977	Providence	13–19			
1978	Providence	17–10			
Providence:		221–173–2			
Harvard (Eastern Intercollegiate Baseball League) (1979–1990)
1979	Harvard	22–14	9-5	4th	
1980	Harvard	24–12	10–4	T–1st	NCAA Regional
1981	Harvard	17–14	6–7	T–5th	
1982	Harvard	17–16	9–9	T–3rd	
1983	Harvard	27–8–1	15–3	1st	NCAA Regional
1984	Harvard	28–6	14–3	1st	NCAA Regional
1985	Harvard	29–9	15–3	T–1st	EIBL Playoff
1986	Harvard	19–11	10–8	T–3rd	
1987	Harvard	19–7	12–4	3rd	
1988	Harvard	16–18	9–9	T–5th	
1989	Harvard	16–17–1	9–9	T–5th	
1990	Harvard	15–20–1	9–9	6th	
Harvard:		249–152–3	127–73–1		
Total:		470–325–5			
National champion Postseason invitational champion Conference regular season champion Conference regular season and conference tournament champion Division regular season champion Division regular season and conference tournament champion Conference tournament champion
