= Frank Sexton =

Frank Sexton may refer to:

- Frank Sexton (baseball)
- Frank Sexton (wrestler)
