= Paul N. Coburn =

American college baseball player and coach

Biographical details
- Born: October 14, 1879; Lowell, Massachusetts, U.S.
- Died: May 18, 1948 (aged 68); New York, New York, U.S.
- Education: Harvard College; Harvard Law School

Playing career
- 1902–1905: Harvard

Coaching career (HC unless noted)
- 1906: Harvard

Head coaching record
- Overall: 12–12

Paul Naylor Coburn (October 14, 1879 – May 18, 1948) was an American baseball player and coach for the Harvard Crimson baseball team.

== Early life ==
Coburn was born in Lowell, Massachusetts on October 14, 1879 to Enoch Frank and Lydia Mary (Naylor) Coburn. He prepared for college at Phillips Academy.

== Baseball ==
Coburn entered Harvard College in 1899. He missed the 1900 season due to a thumb injury and did not play in 1901 due to illness. He pitched for the Harvard freshman team in 1902 and was called up to the varsity team for a single game against Phillips Exeter Academy. In 1903, he was the second string varsity pitcher behind Walter Clarkson. He started the second game of the Harvard-Yale series and earned a victory. He was behind Clarkson again in 1904 until Clarkson was declared ineligibile. On June 4, 1904, Coburn threw a no-hitter against Bowdoin. He threw shutouts in his next two starts, beating Amherst College and Penn Quakers. He scored a win in the deciding game of that year's Harvard–Yale series, which was played at the Polo Grounds in New York City. During the 1905 season, he earned victories over Princeton and Penn (twice) but lost to Holy Cross. In his final start for the Crimson, Coburn surrendered seven runs in a loss to Yale at Yale Field. It was the first time since 1898 that Yale had won a series against Harvard.

Following the Harvard–Yale game, it was announced that Coburn would coach the Crimson for the 1906 season. After reviewing the eligibility rules, Coburn believed he would be able to play in 1906. The Harvard Athletic Committee declared him eligible for the 1906 and accepted his resignation as coach. However, the athletic committee later decided that Coburn would be of more use to the team as a coach announced on December 20, 1905, that Coburn would be Harvard's head coach. The Crimson went 12–12 in his only season as head coach.

== Later life ==
Coburn graduated from Harvard College in 1902 and Harvard Law School in 1906. In 1912, he was sued by Barnard "Poco" Bennett, an old clothes man who regularly loaned money to Harvard students, for failing to pay $4,900 he was loaned in 1906. In 1943, he became an assistant manager at the Ritz-Carlton Hotel in New York City. He died on May 18, 1948 at the Columbia-Presbyterian Medical Center after a brief illness.
