= Thomas F. Murphy (baseball) =

American college baseball player and coach

Biographical details
- Born: April 20, 1882; Cambridge, Massachusetts, U.S.
- Died: September 10, 1953 (aged 71); Boston, Massachusetts, U.S.
- Education: Harvard College; Boston University School of Law

Playing career
- 1901: Harvard

Coaching career (HC unless noted)
- 1905: Harvard

Head coaching record
- Overall: 19–5–1

Thomas Francis Murphy (April 20, 1882 – September 10, 1953) was an American athlete and attorney who played for and coached the Harvard Crimson baseball team.

== Early life ==
Murphy was born in Cambridge, Massachusetts, on April 20, 1882, to Jeremiah and Margaret Agnes (White) Murphy. He prepared for college at Cambridge Latin School, where he played second base for the school's baseball team.

== Harvard ==
Murphy made the Harvard varsity team in 1901 as a freshman. He was the starting second baseman at the beginning of the season, but was replaced by the previous year's starter, Rex Fincke, after Fincke rejoined the team. It was expected Murphy would replace Fincke, who graduated, at second base in 1901, but he and teammate, I. F. Story, were declared ineligible for the 1902 season because they played summer league baseball. Although there was no suspicion that either player had accepted money, the Harvard Athletic Committee reportedly wanted to make an example of them because the team had been warned against playing summer ball for teams that were not strictly amateur.

Murphy graduated from Harvard College in 1904 and entered Harvard Law School that fall. In 1905, he was named "field coach" of the Harvard baseball team under the supervison of graduate advisor Dr. E. H. Nichols and captain C. Walter Randall. According to The New York Times, the unique arrangement came about because Randall was unable to find anyone to coach the team after the previous year's coach, Orville Frantz, declined to return for another season. Harvard went 19–5–1 in Murphy's only season as coach. He remained involved in college athletics as a baseball umpire and football referee.

== Legal career ==
Murphy graduated from the Boston University School of Law in 1907 and began practicing with the firm of Wilson, Juggins, and Murphy. In 1919, he defended Herman L. Barney, who was charged with the murder of a Chelsea, Massachusetts police officer. Barney escaped from the Charles Street Jail before the start of the trial, but was captured in Allston after a tip informed law enforcement that he was hiding in a house on Commonwealth Avenue. On May 28, 1919, Murphy was arrested for aiding and assisting Barney in his escape. On June 18, 1919, judge Thomas H. Connelly dismissed the charge against Murphy. Barney was convicted on the lesser charge of manslaughter. In 1920, Murphy again represented Barney after he escaped from Charlestown State Prison. Barney returned on his own volition, pleaded guilty, and was sentenced to an additional 3–5 years. He was parolled in 1937.

== Civic involvement ==
Murphy served on the Cambridge school committee and was a director of the city's Liberty bond campaigns and Red Cross chapter.

== Death ==
Murphy died on September 10, 1953, at his home in Boston. He was buried in Old Cambridge Cemetery.
