= Archibald Galbraith =

American college baseball player and coach

Biographical details
- Born: September 22, 1877; Boxford, Massachusetts, U.S.
- Died: December 25, 1971 (aged 94); Northampton, Massachusetts, U.S.
- Education: Harvard College

Playing career
- 1899: Harvard

Coaching career (HC unless noted)
- 1901: William Penn Charter School
- 1902: Harvard

Head coaching record
- Overall: 21–3

Archibald Victor Galbraith (September 22, 1877 – December 25, 1971) was an American baseball player and educator who played for and coached for the Harvard Crimson baseball team.

== Biography ==
Galbraith was born in Boxford, Massachusetts, on September 22, 1877, to Frederick W. and Abbie (Sayward) Galbraith. The family moved to California when Galbraith was two and he first attended school in San Diego. In 1886, they moved to Springfield, Massachusetts, where Galbraith graduated from high school. He attended Harvard College and played shortstop for the Harvard baseball team in 1899.

Galbraith his Bachelor of Arts degree from Harvard in 1899 and began his teaching career at the Milton Academy. After one year, he moved to the William Penn Charter School in Philadelphia as a teacher and coach. In 1902, he returned to Harvard as head baseball coach. He was aided by Cy Young, who provided instruction to the pitchers. The Crimson went 21–3 in their lone seasons under Galbraith. From 1903 to 1919, he worked at the Middlesex School. From 1919 to 1949, Galbraith was the headmaster of the Williston School. He is the longest tenured headmaster in the school's history. He died on December 25, 1971 in Northampton, Massachusetts.
