= Adolph Samborski =

American college athletics administrator (1904–1977)

Biographical details
- Born: February 10, 1904; Westfield, Massachusetts, U.S.
- Died: December 8, 1977 (aged 73); York, Maine, U.S.

Playing career

Basketball
- 1921–1925: Harvard

Baseball
- 1922–1925: Harvard

Football
- 1923: Harvard
- Positions: Guard (basketball); Catcher (baseball); Fullback (football)

Coaching career (HC unless noted)

Baseball
- 1934–1946: Harvard (JV)
- 1947–1948: Harvard

Basketball
- 1925–1928: Harvard (freshmen)
- 1933–1934: Harvard (freshmen)

Administrative career (AD unless noted)
- 1927–1961: Harvard (dir. of intramural sports)
- 1961–1963: Harvard (assistant AD)
- 1963–1964: Harvard (associate AD)
- 1964–1970: Harvard
- 1971–1975: Yankee Conference (commissioner)

Adolph Walter Samborski (February 10, 1904 – December 8, 1977) was an American coach and administrator who served as athletic director and head baseball coach at Harvard University.

== Athletic career ==
Samborski attended Harvard after graduating from Westfield High School. He was captain of the freshman basketball team and the starting catcher on the freshman baseball team. He became a starting guard on the varsity basketball team his sophomore season and became the team captain as a junior. He was the backup varsity catcher his sophomore before taking over the starting job his junior year. He was also a fullback on the 1923 Harvard Crimson football team.

== Coaching ==
Samborski graduated from Harvard College in 1925 and remained with the Crimson as freshman basketball coach while he earned master's degrees in education and European history. He also coached the Crimson's junior varsity baseball team and was the varsity baseball coach in 1947 and 1948. He gave up coaching in 1948 to focus on his job as director of intramural sports.

== Administration ==
In 1927 Samborski presented Harvard with a plan for organized intramural sports. The plan was approved and he was named director of intramural sports. In 1961, Samborski became Harvard's assistant athletic director. In 1963 he was promoted to associate athletic director and took over as acting athletic director when Thomas Bolles retired on August 31, 1963. On March 10, 1964, he was given the job permanently. He retired in August 1970. From 1971 to 1975 he was the commissioner of the Yankee Conference. He died on December 8, 1977, in York, Maine after a long illness.
