= Bill Decker =

American college baseball coach

Current position
- Title: Head coach
- Team: Harvard
- Conference: Ivy League
- Record: 202–296 (.406)

Playing career

Football
- 1980–1984: Ithaca

Baseball
- ?: Ithaca

Coaching career (HC unless noted)

Football
- 1999: Trinity (CT)

Baseball
- 1989: Wesleyan (assistant)
- 1990: Macalester
- 1991–2012: Trinity (CT)
- 2013–present: Harvard

Head coaching record
- Overall: 5–3 (.625) (football); 739–553 (.572) (baseball)
- Tournaments: Baseball; 25–18 (NCAA D-III); 19–8 (NESCAC); 0–2 (NCAA D-I); 2–2 (IVY)

Accomplishments and honors

Championships
- 5× NESCAC East (2003, 2005, 2008, 2009, 2012); 4× NESCAC Tournament (2003, 2008, 2009, 2012); Ivy League (2019); Ivy League Series (2019)

Awards
- Ivy League Coach of the Year (2019)

Bill Decker in an American college baseball coach, currently serving as head coach of the Harvard Crimson baseball program. He was named to that position prior to the 2013 season.

== Playing career ==
Decker played baseball and football for Ithaca. His baseball career ended prematurely due to injury, but Decker served as captain of the football team in his senior season. Decker was a defensive end for the Bombers football team.

== Coaching career ==
Decker's coaching career began with a single season each at Deerfield Academy and Phillips Exeter Academy in assistant coaching roles. He then moved to the college level at Wesleyan for a single season before earning his first head coaching position at Minnesota's Macalester. After one season and an 8–26 record, he moved to Trinity in Hartford, Connecticut. In his second season, the Bantams reached the ECAC semifinals. In 1998, Trinity made its first of nine appearances in the NCAA Division III Baseball Championship. The Bantams reached the College World Series in 2003, 2005, and 2008, winning the national championship in 2008. In his tenure, the Bantams recorded 529 wins and 231 losses, for a winning percentage of .696, including a 45–1 record in 2008. Decker earned many coach of the year awards, including the American Baseball Coaches Association National Coach of the Year in 2008. After the 2012 season and another NCAA tournament appearance, Decker was hired to replace the deceased Joe Walsh at Harvard.

== Head coaching record ==
=== Football ===
Year	Team	Overall	Conference	Standing	Bowl/playoffs
Trinity Bantams (New England Small College Athletic Conference) (1998)
1999	Trinity	5–3	5–3	T–3rd	
Trinity:		5–3	5–3		
Total:		5–3			

=== Baseball ===
This table shows Decker's record as a collegiate head baseball coach.

Record table
Season	Team	Overall	Conference	Standing	Postseason
Macalester Scots (Minnesota Intercollegiate Athletic Conference) (1990)
1990	Macalaster	8–26	4–16	T–10th	
Macalaster:		8–26 (.235)	4–16 (.200)		
Trinity Bantams (Eastern Collegiate Athletic Conference) (1991–1994)
1991	Trinity	14–9	11–8		
1992	Trinity	19–9	17–5		
1993	Trinity	12–8			
1994	Trinity	18–13			
Trinity Bantams (NCAA Division III independent) (1995–1999)
1995	Trinity	21–12			
1996	Trinity	19–15			
1997	Trinity	17–13			
1998	Trinity	23–11			NCAA Regional
1999	Trinity	25–11			NCAA Regional
Trinity Bantams (New England Small College Athletic Conference) (2000–2012)
2000	Trinity	22–9	7–3		NCAA Regional
2001	Trinity	25–10	9–3	2nd (East)	NESCAC Tournament
2002	Trinity	26–10	8–4	2nd (East)	NESCAC Tournament
2003	Trinity	27–12	9–3	T–1st (East)	College World Series
2004	Trinity	27–9	10–2	1st (East)	NESCAC Tournament
2005	Trinity	35–9	10–2	T–1st (East)	College World Series
2006	Trinity	17–18	6–6	3rd (East)	
2007	Trinity	30–8	8–4	3rd (East)	NCAA Regional
2008	Trinity	45–1	12–0	1st (East)	National Champions
2009	Trinity	33–7	12–0	1st (East)	College World Series
2010	Trinity	19–11	6–6	T–2nd (East)	
2011	Trinity	21–15	5–7	T–3rd (East)	
2012	Trinity	34–11	10–2	1st (East)	NCAA Regional
Trinity:		529–231 (.696)	140–55 (.718)		
Harvard Crimson (Ivy League) (2013–present)
2013	Harvard	10–30	7–13	3rd (Rolfe)	
2014	Harvard	11–28	5–15	4th (Rolfe)	
2015	Harvard	18–24	7–13	2nd (Rolfe)	
2016	Harvard	17–24	9–11	T–3rd (Rolfe)	
2017	Harvard	19–23	7–13	3rd (Rolfe)	
2018	Harvard	22–20	12–9	4th	
2019	Harvard	27–16	14–7	1st	NCAA Regional
2020	Harvard	1–5	0–0		Season canceled due to COVID-19
2021	Harvard	0–0	0–0		Ivy League opted-out of the season
2022	Harvard	19–22	10–11	T-4th	
2023	Harvard	20–24	15–6	2nd	
2024	Harvard	13–26	9–12	6th	
2025	Harvard	14–28	9–12	4th	Ivy League Tournament
2026	Harvard	11–26	9–12	5th	
Harvard:		202–296 (.406)	113–134 (.457)		
Total:		739–553 (.572)			
National champion Postseason invitational champion Conference regular season champion Conference regular season and conference tournament champion Division regular season champion Division regular season and conference tournament champion Conference tournament champion

== See also ==
- List of current NCAA Division I baseball coaches
