= Loyal K. Park =

American sports coach and administrator (1933–2020)

Biographical details
- Born: October 5, 1930
- Died: April 17, 2020 (aged 89); Park Ridge, Illinois, U.S.
- Education: Edinboro State College

Playing career

Football
- 1949–1952: Edinboro

Baseball
- 1953: Fitzgerald Pioneers
- 1954: Morristown Reds

Coaching career (HC unless noted)

Football
- 1957–1959: Evans City HS (PA)
- 1960–1961: Edinboro
- 1962: Boston College (assistant)
- c. 1965–1975: Harvard (assistant)

Basketball
- 1960–1962: Edinboro

Baseball
- 1967–1968: Harvard (assistant)
- 1969–1978: Harvard

Administrative career (AD unless noted)
- 1979: Salem
- 1980–1986: Loyola (IL)
- c. 1990–?: Frostburg State

Head coaching record
- Overall: 7–7–2 (college football); 23–22 (college basketball); 247–93 (college baseball)

Loyal Kenneth Park Jr. (October 5, 1930 – April 17, 2020) was an American professional baseball player, college football and basketball coach, and college athletics administrator.

== Personal life ==
Park attended Edinboro State College where he played football from 1949 to 1952. He also competed on the school's basketball and track and field teams. Park was married to Agnes Park. Their children were John M. Park, Kenneth R. Park, and Mary Beth Park Arnold. He died on April 17, 2020, at the age of 89 in Park Ridge, Illinois.

== Career ==
=== Baseball ===
Park played minor league baseball with the Fitzgerald Pioneers in 1953 and with the Morristown Reds in 1954. He played outfield and batted right.

=== Coaching ===
Park was as the head men's basketball and football coach at Edinboro University (then-known as Edinboro State College) from 1960 to 1962. After serving for a time as an assistant football coach at Boston College, he was the head baseball coach at Harvard University from 1969 to 1978. He was also the director of athletics Salem University in 1979, Loyola University Chicago from 1980 to 1986, and Frostburg State University from 1987 until his retirement.

== Head coaching record ==
=== College football ===
Year	Team	Overall	Conference	Standing	Bowl/playoffs
Edinboro Fighting Scots (Pennsylvania State College Conference) (1960–1961)
1960	Edinboro	3–4–1	1–3–1	6th (West)	
1961	Edinboro	4–3–1	1–3–1	5th (West)	
Edinboro:		7–7–2	2–6–2		
Total:		7–7–2			
