= Harvard Surgical Unit =

Medical unit in World War I

The Harvard Surgical Unit (sometimes called the Harvard Medical Unit) was a volunteer contingent of medical personnel from Harvard University and Massachusetts General Hospital who provided medical assistance to the British Expeditionary Force in Europe during World War I. It was organized in June 1915 and was demobilized in January 1919. It operated General Hospital No. 22 of the Royal Army Medical Corps, located in Camiers, France.

== History ==
In May 1915, William Osler, representing the British government, asked Harvard University, Columbia University, and Johns Hopkins University to provide personnel to staff a hospital in England or France. President of Harvard University A. Lawrence Lowell agreed to the request and promised that he "would do [his] best endeavor to furnish a similar unit" for Germany if they requested it. Dr. E. H. Nichols, head of service at Boston City Hospital and a member of the Harvard faculty, was tasked with organizing the unit. Seeing the need for a business manager, he enlisted the services of Herbert H. White, treasurer of the Harvard University Press. On June 26, 1915, a party of 32 surgeons and 75 nurses left New York City for Falmouth aboard Holland America Line's SS Noordam. Chief surgeons were to serve a term of three months and junior surgeons were to serve for six. All surgeons in the Harvard Surgical Unit were given honorary commissions in the Royal Army Medical Corps. Nurses were not given any official title. Nichols returned to the U.S. In the fall of 1915 was succeeded by Dr. William E. Faulkner. As part of the original plan, the Harvard Surgical Unit was supposed to rotate with units from Columbia and Johns Hopkins, but they were unable to carry out their part of the program. In November 1915, the Harvard Surgical Unit left France and the hospital was taken over by the R. A. M. C.

Due to the efforts of Lowell, White, and Dr. David Cheever, a second Harvard unit reached France in December 1915. In June 1916, Cheever was replaced by Dr. Hugh Cabot, who led the unit until September 1916, when he was succeeded by Dr. D. F. Jones. Three months later, the Harvard Corporation voted to have Cabot lead the unit for the remainder of the war. Dr. C. M. Robinson served as acting chief until Cabot's return.

The unit suffered only one casualty. Constance M. Sinclair, a Canadian nurse from Massachusetts General Hospital, died from meningitis on February 22, 1917.

A number of the unit's members were personally decorated by George V. Hugh Cabot was made a companion of the Order of St Michael and St George, Edward Harding received the Military Cross, and Katherine Hagar, Helen Joy Hinckley, Mable Noyes, Hulda Enebuske, Letitia Kelley, Alvira Stevens, Catherine Fraser, and Georgena Davidson were awarded the Royal Red Cross.

The Harvard Surgical Unit was demobilized the British War Department on January 8, 1919. They left from Liverpool abord the White Star Line's SS Megantic on January 20, 1919 and reached Portland, Maine on January 30. The unit returned to Boston by train that night. Upon arriving, they were ordered to report to Camp Devens for demobilization. However, Herbert H. White, the unit's commander, refused the order, as the Harvard Surgical Unit was part of the British Army and not subject to orders from the United States Department of War.
