= C. Walter Randall =

Clarence Walter Randall (August 7, 1881 – May 30, 1969) was an American athlete and attorney who was a three-sport star (baseball, basketball, and football) for the Harvard Crimson. After graduating from Harvard Law School, he had a long legal career in New York.

== Athletics ==
Randall was born in Boston on August 7, 1881, to Charles Warren Milton Randall and May Isabelle (Edwards) Randall. He grew up in St. Louis and was a member of his high school football, baseball, basketball, hockey, and track teams.

Randall made the varsity baseball team as a freshman and was elected captain for the 1905 season. He was a substitute back on the 1903 Harvard Crimson football team and played left end the following season, but quit the team after he was benched for the October 29 game against Penn. He was the starting center for the Harvard Crimson men's basketball team during the 1903–04 and 1904–05 seasons. Although he was a fine hockey player, Randall never tried out for the Harvard Crimson men's ice hockey because he preferred basketball and overlapping schedules prevented him from playing both sports. Outside of athletics, Randall worked as the Harvard correspondent for the Boston Daily Advertiser and The Boston Record.

In 1905, Randall was hired to coach the football at Nashua High School in Nashua, New Hampshire. He planned on playing for the Harvard basketball team that winter, but was declared ineligible because he had accepted a paid coaching job. He instead served as Harvard's basketball coach.

Prior to the 1906 Major League Baseball season, it was reported that St. Louis Browns president Robert Hedges wanted to sign Randall to replace Tom Jones at first base. Randall, however, chose to continue his studies at Harvard Law School. That fall, he helped Harvard football coach Bill Reid teach his players the newly legal forward pass. Soon thereafter, he moved to New York City, where he covered college football for the New York Evening Post.

In December 1906, Randall was selected to referee Eastern Intercollegiate Basketball League games held in New Haven, Connecticut. He served on the collegiate basketball rules committee for many years.

Prior to the 1907 baseball season, Randall was reportedly a candidate for the Harvard coaching job, but was unwilling to leave his business commitments in New York.

== Legal and business career ==
Randall represented John Ellis Roosevelt during his divorce from Edith Hammersley Biscoe. Roosevelt tried to have the marriage annulled, claiming he was the victim of misrepresentation. The case was heavily reported in the News at the time. Edith won the case in 1916 and Roosevelt was ordered to pay her $400 a month in alimony.

From 1922 to 1923, Randall was vice president, secretary, and director of Pierce Oil. In 1925, he, Lindley Miller Garrison, and Robert Burns represented Henry Latham Doherty and Henry Clay Pierce in Pierce Oil's lawsuit against them for alleged losses when they were in control the company.

In 1932, Randall was the Republican nominee for a New York Supreme Court seat in the second judicial district.

In 1933, Randall and James Van Siclen were appointed temporary receivers for the Bush Terminal Company by United States District Court for the Eastern District of New York judge Robert Alexander Inch. They were made permanent trustees in January 1935. They chose E. T. Bedford to replace Irving T. Bush as company president. In 1936, they sued Bush for libel after he accused them of wanting "to hold their jobs as long as possible and get all they can out of it" in a letter to stockholders. On April 22, 1938, a jury awarded them $116,000. The judgement was later reduced to $50,000 on appeal. Van Siclen resigned in 1936 and Randall continued as the sole trustee. As sole trustee, Randall sued the former directors of the company for dividends paid between 1928 and 1932 on the grounds that the payments impaired the company's capital and violated New York state law. The case, Randall v. Bailey, was decided in favor of the directors. Randall completed the reorganization of Bush Terminal Co. on April 1, 1937, and turned the company over to its officers.

== Personal life ==
In 1909, Randall married Emilie S. Whitehouse. They had two children that lived into adulthood. The family were longtime residents of Garden City, New York. Randall is credited for creating the 1919 "Community Agreement" which is still used to run Garden City's government. In 1956, he represented the Garden City Jewish Center in their successful lawsuit challenging the village board's denial of their permit to convert a private residence into a synagogue. Emilie Randall died suddenly on March 16, 1964.

Randall was president of the Nassau County Bar Association and chairman of the Downtown Athletic Club's advisory committee.

Randall died on May 30, 1969 in Waukegan, Illinois.
