= SS Tivives =

United Fruit Company passenger and refrigerated fruit cargo ship

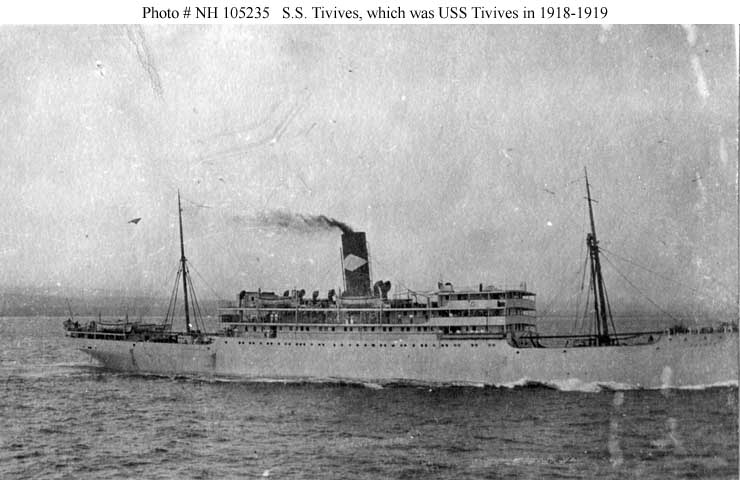

History
- Name: Tivives
- Owner: United Fruit Company; WSA control 29 May 1942 – 21 October 1943
- Operator: United Fruit Company (August 1911 – July 1918); (United States Navy) U.S. Navy (July 1918 – April 1919); United Fruit Company (April 1919 – October 1943)
- Port of registry: United Kingdom (1911–10 September 1914); United States (10 September 1914–1943)
- Builder: Workman, Clark & Company, Ltd.
- Launched: 1 August 1911 as Peralta
- Completed: 1911
- Fate: Sunk in air attack 21 October 1943

General characteristics
- Tonnage: 4,596 GRT4,290 DWT
- Length: 378 ft 8 in (115.4 m); 378 ft 9 in (115.4 m)
- Beam: 50 ft 3 in (15.3 m); 50 ft 4 in (15.3 m)
- Draft: mean 22 ft 6.5 in (6.9 m)
- Depth: 29 ft 1 in (8.9 m)
- Propulsion: Triple expansion steam, cyl 27 in (0.69 m), 45 in (1.14 m) and 75 in (1.91 m) with 54 in (1.37 m) stroke. Five single ended Scotch boilers 13 ft 6 in (4.1 m) diameter by 11 ft 6 in (3.5 m) long.
- Notes: As USS Tivives (5 July 1918 – 25 April 1919) the ship had a complement of 91 and was armed with a 5-inch gun and a 3-inch gun.

SS Tivives was a United Fruit Company passenger and refrigerated fruit cargo ship built 1911 by Workman, Clark & Company, Ltd. in Belfast. The ship was launched 1 August 1911 as Peralta but renamed before completion. As a foreign built vessel operating for a company in the United States the ship was British flagged. With outbreak of war in Europe in 1914 the ship, as did all British registered company ships, changed flag to the United States. Between 5 July 1918 and 25 April 1919 the ship was chartered and commissioned by the United States Navy for operation as USS Tivives

Tivives resumed service with the United Fruit Company until World War II when she was operating as a War Shipping Administration vessel with United Fruit Company as agent and sunk on 21 October 1943 off the Algerian coast by German aircraft.

== Construction ==
Peralta was built by Workman, Clark & Company, Ltd. for the Tropical Fruit Steamship Company of which Andrew W. Preston, the president and director of United Fruit Company was chairman and director, and launched 1 August 1922 at Belfast but renamed Tivives before completion. The ship was built to the highest class of the British Corporation Registry of Shipping and to the standards of the British Board of Trade and the United States Steamship Passenger Inspection Service.

Passenger accommodations included some cabins that could become family suites and several "cabins de luxe" on the bridge deck. The cargo space was divided into eight refrigerated compartments. Propulsion was by a triple expansion steam engine provided steam by five single ended boilers. On 28 October the Tivives departed Belfast for sea trials and then put in at Holyhead to embark passengers for her voyage to the West Indies and commencement of regular service from the United States.

== Early commercial service ==
Tivives was one of three new ships, the others being Carrillo and Sixaola, to begin service 6 January 1912 between New York and Limon, Costa Rica by way of Jamaica and Panama. The ship's Dictionary of American Naval Fighting Ships entry speculates the name was "probably coined by the United Fruit Co. from the Spanish words 'ti' and 'viveres' and roughly translated as "your food". It is as likely United Fruit, which knew the area intimately and did use geographic names for its ships, named the ship after a geographical location associated with Costa Rica such as the village of Tivives or the historical bay of Tivives. The ship, part of United Fruit's "Great White Fleet," had spacious passenger accommodations that were air conditioned and cabins with temperature regulated by the passenger down to 55 °F (12.8 °C) for twenty-four day cruises with a day in Jamaica and three in Panama.

In 1914, with the outbreak of war in Europe, Congress passed a law allowing foreign registered, foreign built ships belonging to United States companies to shift registry to the United States flag which the United Fruit Company had long wished to do, had sought a special act of Congress to do, but had failed. With the new law United Fruit began its fleet transition with Tivives being the first ship to shift from British registry and hoist the U.S. flag on 10 September 1914 at Boston.

== World War I service ==
On 5 July 1918 Tivives was chartered and commissioned by the United States Navy as USS Tivives at New York and assigned to the Naval Overseas Transportation Service. On 13 July the refrigerated ship, loaded with beef and trucks, joined a convoy for France reaching Gironde on 28 July then discharged cargo the next day at St. Nazaire. Tivives joined a homeward bound convoy 15 August at Verdon reaching New York on 26 August where she again loaded beef sailing 2 September bound for unloading cargo at Rochefort. On 30 September the ship was again homeward bound, arriving 13 October, to pick up and deliver another cargo of beef reaching Verdon 6 November with the armistice being signed while the ship was unloading. Returning to New York the ship made two more voyages with beef to Europe and military equipment on the return between Christmas 1918 and final return to New York 27 March 1919 and being decommissioned on 25 April. The Navy identification number ID-4521 was assigned years after the ship's actual Naval service.

== Return to commercial service ==
Tivives was returned to United Fruit Company and resumed commercial service. In 1933 the company let contracts for reconditioning five ships including Tivives which was to get upgrades to passenger facilities and an increase in speed from 13 knots (15 mph; 24 km/h) to 14 knots (16 mph; 26 km/h).

== World War II ==
On 29 May 1942 Tivives was delivered to the War Shipping Administration (WSA) at New Orleans by United Fruit Company which then operated the ship as agent under an Army Transportation Corps charter agreement until 12 September when the agreement was changed to a WSA general agency form to operate as a WSA vessel. The ship was in convoy MKS 28 on 21 October 1943 and about 15 miles off Cape Ténès, Algeria, when the convoy came under attack by German aircraft strafing and torpedoing Tivives which quickly sank with the loss of one of the 48 man civilian crew and one of the 25 man Naval Armed Guard. Survivors, including the six man staff of the convoy commodore and one passenger were rescued by the Free French-manned corvette HMS La Malouine.

== Bibliography ==
- Cressman, Robert J. (1999). "The Official Chronology of the U.S. Navy in World War II". Contemporary History Branch, Naval Historical Center (now Naval History & Heritage Command)10 July 2015.
- Guardia, Ricardo Fernández; van Dyke, Harry Weston (1913). History of the Discovery and Conquest of Costa Rica. New York: Thomas Y. Crowell Company. p. 201.
- Hydrographic Office (1918). Mexican and Central American Pilot (Pacific Coast). Coast Pilots. Washington, D.C.: United States Navy Hydrographic Office. p. 320.
- Johnson, Eads (1917). Johnson's Steam Vessels of the Atlantic Coast. New York: Eads Johnson Publishing Company. p. 188.
- Marine Engineer and Naval Architect (1911). "Peralta". Marine Engineer and Naval Architect. 34 (September 1911). London: 58, 61.
- Marine Engineer and Naval Architect (1911). "Tivives". Marine Engineer and Naval Architect. 34 (December 1911). London: 185.
- Maritime Administration. "Tivives". Ship History Database Vessel Status Card. U.S. Department of Transportation, Maritime Administration. Archived from the original on 8 July 2015.
- Naval History And Heritage Command. "Tivives". Dictionary of American Naval Fighting Ships. Naval History And Heritage Command.
- "United Fruit Reconditions Five". Pacific Marine Review. 30 (November). San Francisco: J.S. Hines: 341. 1933.
- Pan American Union (1912). "New United Fruit Co. Steamship Service". Bulletin of the Pan American Union. 34 (January). Washington: The Pan American Union: 17, 19.
- Roberts, Stephen S. (10 October 2007). "S.S. Tivives (American Passenger and Refrigerated Cargo Ship, 1911) Served as USS Tivives (ID # 4521) in 1918–1919 (archive copy of Naval History And Heritage Command's Online Library of Selected Images page)". ShipScribe.
- Successful Americans of Our Day: Andrew W. Preston. Chicago: Successful Americans. 1911. p. 76.
- Thompson, Grace Agnes (1915). "The Story of a Great New England Enterprise". New England Magazine (May). Boston: New England Magazine Co.
- United States Senate (1915), Seeking the Flag in War, Senate Reports (Public), 63d Congress, 3d Session (7 December 1914 – 4 March 1915), vol. 1, Washington: Government Printing Office, p. 29
