= Harvard Crimson baseball =

Varsity intercollegiate baseball team of Harvard University

Harvard Crimson
- 2025 Harvard Crimson baseball team
- Founded: 1865
- University: Harvard University
- Head coach: Bill Decker (14th season)
- Conference: Ivy League; Rolfe Division
- Location: Boston, Massachusetts
- Home stadium: Joseph J. O'Donnell Field (capacity: 1,600)
- Nickname: Crimson
- Colors: Crimson, white, and black

College World Series appearances
- 1968, 1971, 1973, 1974

NCAA tournament appearances
- 1968, 1971, 1972, 1973, 1974, 1978, 1980, 1983, 1984, 1997, 1998, 1999, 2002, 2005, 2019

Conference tournament champions
- 1997, 1998, 1999, 2002, 2005, 2019

Conference regular season champions
- EIBL: 1936, 1939, 1955, 1958, 1964, 1968, 1971, 1972, 1973, 1974, 1978, 1980, 1983, 1984; Ivy: 1955, 1958, 1962, 1968, 1971, 1972, 1973, 1974, 1978, 1980, 1983, 1984, 1985, 2019; Ivy Rolfe: 1996, 1997, 1998, 1999, 2002, 2003, 2005, 2006, 2019

The Harvard Crimson baseball team is the varsity intercollegiate baseball team of Harvard University, located in Boston, Massachusetts. The program has been a member of the Ivy League since the conference officially began sponsoring baseball at the start of the 1993 season. The team plays at Joseph J. O'Donnell Field, located across the Charles River from Harvard's main campus. Bill Decker has been the program's head coach since the 2013 season.

The program has appeared in four College World Series and 14 NCAA tournaments. It has won five Ivy League Championship Series, eight Rolfe Division titles, 15 EIBL regular season titles, and 12 Ivy League regular season titles. In 2019, the team won its first Ivy League title since 2005 when they defeated Columbia in the Ivy League Playoff Series.

As of the start of the 2014 Major League Baseball season, 12 former Crimson players have appeared in Major League Baseball.

== History ==
=== 19th century ===
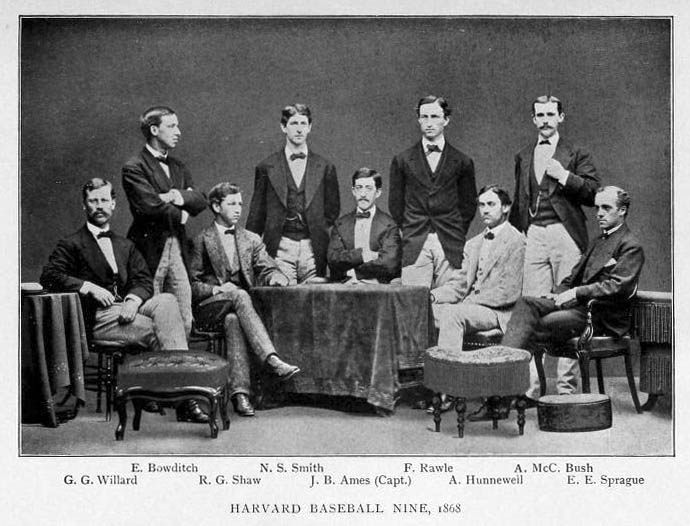
Harvard baseball nine of 1868

Harvard College's first season of baseball came in 1865; the team went 6–0 that year. It played one intercollegiate game (against Williams) and five against semi-professional teams. Organized baseball at the college had begun a few years earlier, when "class nines" (the teams of each of Harvard College's four class years) were first fielded; the first of these was the '66 Baseball Club, formed in 1862 by members of that year's freshman class. Despite these early years of competition, 1865 was the school's first varsity intercollegiate season.

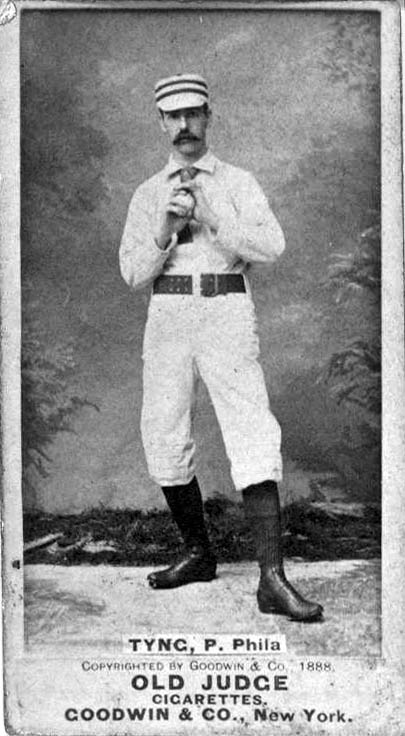
Catcher Jim Tyng displayed on a cigarette card

Along with rowing, baseball was popular at Harvard in the late 19th century. A newspaper review of the 1871 book Four Years at Yale says that the book includes "interesting accounts of the sports common in colleges, especially baseball and rowing, and the principal matches which have taken place between Harvard and Yale." An 1884 edition of the Washington Bee reprinted a Lowell Courier humor section piece that reads, "Sixty Harvard freshman have dropped their Latin, eighty their Greek and 100 their mathematics. None of them have dropped their baseball or their boating, however, and college culture is still safe."

In a game against a semi-professional team from Lynn on April 12, 1877, Harvard catcher Jim Tyng became the first baseball player to use a catcher's mask. The mask was invented by another student, Frederick Thayer, and manufactured by a Cambridge tinsmith. Tyng later became the first Harvard player to appear in Major League Baseball when he played in a September 23, 1879, game for the Boston Red Caps.

In the 1870s and 1880s, Harvard was a member of two loosely organized forerunners of the Ivy League. The Intercollegiate Base Ball Association, which it played in from 1879 to 1886, included Yale, Princeton, Dartmouth, Brown, and Amherst. The College Baseball League, which it played in from 1887 to 1889, featured Yale, Princeton, and Columbia.

The school continued to field a varsity baseball team through the end of the 19th century. It played both fall and spring regular season games in its early years, but moved to a spring-only schedule after the 1885–1886 season. The program's highest 19th-century win total was 34, a mark it reached in both 1870 (34–9–1) and 1892 (34–5). Through the end of the 1899 season, the program played without a head coach and was instead led by its captains.

Two important changes to the program occurred near the end of the 19th century– at the start of the 1898 season, Harvard began playing home games at Soldier's Field, and at the start of the 1900 season, it hired E. H. Nichols as its first head coach.

=== Pre-World War II ===
The program went .500 or better in 15 of the 17 seasons from 1900 to 1916. Its highest win total in that stretch, 23, came in 1915 under head coach Percy Haughton. Two head coaches served four-season tenures during the time period. Louis Pieper coached from 1907 to 1910; the program's two losing records in this time period came under him. Frank Sexton also coached for four seasons (1911–1914); the program had a winning record in each.

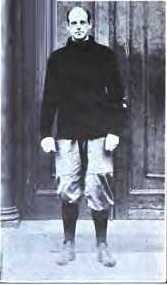
Percy Haughton in 1919.

In the early 20th century, Harvard held tryouts, usually in the spring, to select the members of the team from the student body. To start the regular season, the team often traveled to the Southern United States to play games in warm weather, a practice that began in 1898. Up until the start of World War I, its scheduled included professional and semi-professional teams, in addition to collegiate teams.

Hall of Fame pitcher Cy Young, then a member of the Boston Americans, served as the team's pitching coach for a brief time in 1902. Another future Hall of Famer, Willie Keeler of the Brooklyn Superbas, served alongside Young as the team's hitting coach.

William Clarence Matthews was Harvard's shortstop from 1902 to 1905. Matthews was black. A handful of black students graduated from Harvard around that time (its first black graduate, Richard Theodore Greener, was a member of the class of 1870), but Matthews one of only a few black players in major college athletics during an era in which baseball was divided by the color line. Harvard went 75–18 during Matthews's career. As a freshman, he scored the winning run in Harvard's 6–5 win in the decisive game of the Yale series; he also led the team in batting average as a sophomore, junior, and senior. Matthews faced racial discrimination while a member of the team. During his freshman season, he was held out of games against Navy and Virginia due to their objections to Harvard's fielding a black player. In 1903, the following year, Harvard canceled its annual southern trip when it faced similar objections. After Harvard, Matthews played one season of professional baseball and went on to a career in law. The trophy given to the Ivy League's baseball champion is named for Matthews. He was inducted into the College Baseball Hall of Fame in 2014.

The 1917 season was canceled because of World War I, but the program resumed play in 1918. Through the 1932 season, the program competed as an independent school. For the 1933 season, however, Harvard joined the Eastern Intercollegiate Baseball League (EIBL), which had been formed by several Ivy League schools for the start of the 1930 season.

Prior to the start of the 1926 season, Fred Mitchell was hired for his second stint as Harvard head baseball coach (he also led the program during the 1916 season). Mitchell's second stint lasted until 1938– Harvard's final four seasons as an independent and first six in the EIBL. Under Mitchell, Harvard won its first EIBL title; with an 8–4 league record in 1936, it tied Dartmouth for the championship. Mitchell was replaced by Floyd Stahl. In Stahl's first season, Harvard won its second EIBL title, finishing with a 9–3 league record.

Because of World War II, Harvard competed as an independent in 1943 and 1946 and did not sponsor a team in 1944 or 1945.

=== Post-World War II ===
==== EIBL ====
Harvard rejoined the EIBL for the 1947 season. For the 1948 season, Brown joined the seven other Ivy League schools in the league; Army and Navy also joined, giving the league 10 members. In the immediate postwar years, under head coaches Adolph Samborski (1947–1948) and Stuffy McInnis (1949–1954), the program finished no higher than 4th in the EIBL.

Norman Shepard became the program's head coach for the start of the 1955 season. Under Shepard, Harvard won four EIBL titles (1955, 1958, 1964, 1968), going undefeated in league play in 1958 and 1964. In 1968, Shepard's final season, the team qualified for its first NCAA tournament. In order for Harvard to play in the tournament, Shepard threatened to speed up his retirement if the NCAA did not reschedule the District 1 Regional to avoid a conflict with Harvard's final exams. His threat succeeded, and Harvard won the rescheduled District 1 Regional, defeating Boston University once and Connecticut twice to advance to the College World Series. There, it lost its opening game to St. John's, 2–0, and an elimination game to Southern Illinois, 2–1.

Loyal K. Park was hired as head coach prior to the start of the 1969 season. After finishing tied for 5th and tied for 2nd in the EIBL in his first two seasons, the program had its most successful four-year stretch from 1971 to 1974. Harvard won four consecutive EIBL titles and played in three College World Series. In 1971, Harvard won the EIBL outright and swept Massachusetts in a best-of-three District 1 Regional. In the College World Series, Harvard defeated BYU, 4–1, in its opening game, but was eliminated by consecutive one-run losses to Tulsa and Texas–Pan American. In 1972, Harvard tied Cornell for the EIBL title, but won a playoff to advance to that year's NCAA tournament. There, it advanced to the District 1 Regional finals, but lost to Connecticut, 11–2. In 1973, the program won the EIBL outright and went undefeated in the District 1 Regional to advance to the College World Series. There, it lost consecutive games to Southern California and Georgia Southern. In 1974, Harvard defeated Princeton in an EIBL tiebreaker playoff and won the District 1 Regional, but lost consecutive games to Miami and Northern Colorado at the 1974 College World Series. Park coached through the end of the 1978 season, in which Harvard won the EIBL and played in the NCAA tournament.

Alex Nahigian replaced Park and was the program's head coach from 1979 to 1990. Nahigian had been the head coach at Providence from 1960 to 1978. Under Nahigian, Harvard appeared in three NCAA tournaments (1980, 1983, 1984). In both 1980 and 1983, it advanced to the Northeast Regional final, but lost there to St. John's in 1980 and Maine in 1983. During Nahigian's 12-year tenure, Harvard's overall record was 249–152–3.

During the successful years under Shepard, Park, and Nahigian, many Crimson players distinguished themselves individually. The era from 1955–1990 saw 17 First-Team All-America selections and 31 Major League Baseball draft selections. Paul del Rossi, a pitcher under Shepard from 1962 to 1964, set the EIBL/Ivy career record for wins, with 30. Future Major Leaguer Mike Stenhouse, who played for Park and Nahigian from 1977 to 1979, set single-season and career EIBL/Ivy batting average records, was twice named a First-Team All-American, and was a first-round draft pick of the Oakland Athletics in 1979. Another future Major Leaguer, Jeff Musselman, was the 1985 EIBL Pitcher of the Year.

==== Ivy League ====
During the tenure of Leigh Hogan (1991–1995), the EIBL folded, and the Ivy League began sponsoring baseball. Several northeast schools had formed the Patriot League in 1986, and the two non-Ivy members of the EIBL, Army and Navy, had joined the league in other sports– Army in 1990–1991 and Navy in 1991–1992. Both schools' baseball programs played their last seasons in the EIBL in 1992. Beginning with the 1993 season, the Ivy League sponsored baseball. Its eight teams competed in two four-team divisions: Harvard, Dartmouth, Yale, and Brown in the Rolfe Division, and Columbia, Cornell, Princeton, and Penn in the Gehrig Division. The division winners met in a best-of-three championship series to decide the conference's automatic bid to the NCAA tournament.

Hogan resigned following the 1995 season after coaching the program for its first three Ivy League seasons, and Suffolk head coach Joe Walsh was hired to replace him. Starting with Walsh, Harvard made its head baseball coaching position a full-time position.

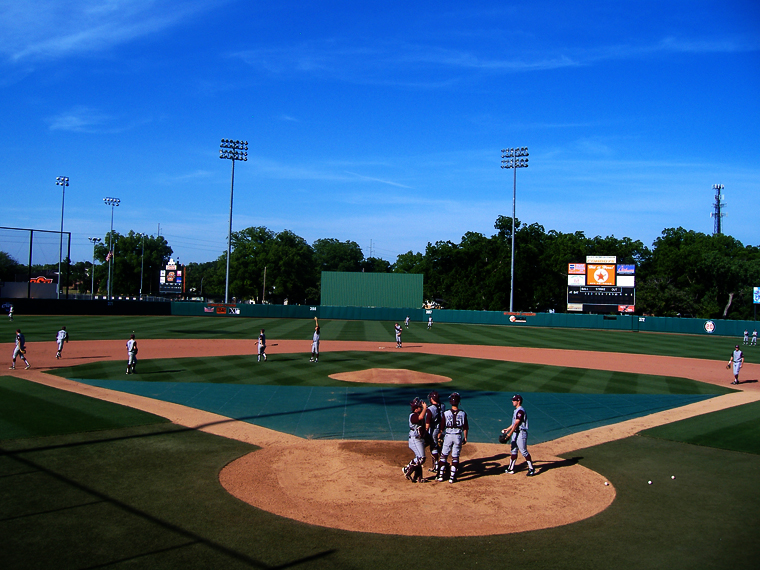
Oklahoma State's Allie P. Reynolds Stadium, the site of Harvard's third-place regional finish in 1997.

In Walsh's first season, 1996, Harvard won the Rolfe Division, finishing three games ahead of second-place Yale, but was swept by Princeton in the best-of-three Ivy League Championship Series. Harvard then made three consecutive NCAA tournaments, after last having qualified in 1984. It defeated Princeton in the championship series in each season. As the sixth seed in the 1997 NCAA tournament, it placed third in the six-team, double-elimination Midwest Regional. After defeating first-seeded UCLA, 7–2, and fourth-seeded Stetson, 8–6, to open the regional, it lost consecutive games to host Oklahoma State and UCLA and was eliminated. As the fifth seed in the 1998 NCAA tournament, it again finished third in its regional. After losing its opening game to second-seeded Cal State Fullerton, it won elimination games against Nicholls State and Tulane before being eliminated by Fullerton. In the 1999 tournament, the first year of four-team regionals, Harvard lost consecutive games to Pepperdine and VCU.

Harvard won four more Rolfe Division titles in the early 2000s, thus appearing in four Ivy League Championship Series (2002, 2003, 2005, 2006). It won the 2002 series (over Princeton) and 2005 series (over Cornell) to advance to two NCAA tournaments. It went 0–2 in both. In the late 2000s and early 2010s, the program struggled, winning no Rolfe Division titles and finishing last in the division in 2008, 2011, and 2014.

On July 31, 2012, Walsh died of a heart attack in his Chester, New Hampshire home. He was 58 years old and had coached the program for 17 seasons, appearing in five NCAA tournaments. Beginning in 2014, the NEIBA All-Star Game was named for Walsh. In September 2012, the school hired Bill Decker to replace Walsh. Decker came from Division III Trinity (CT), where he had been the head coach for 22 seasons and won the 2008 National Championship.

Prior to the 2013 season, several players were implicated in an academic cheating scandal and were forced to withdraw from Harvard. The 2013 team's record was 10–31 (7–13 Ivy); it finished third in the Rolfe Division.

=== Conference affiliations ===
- Independent (1865–1916, 1918–1932, 1943, 1946)
- Eastern Intercollegiate Baseball League (1933–1942, 1947–1992)
- Ivy League (1993–present)

== Venues ==
=== Early venues ===
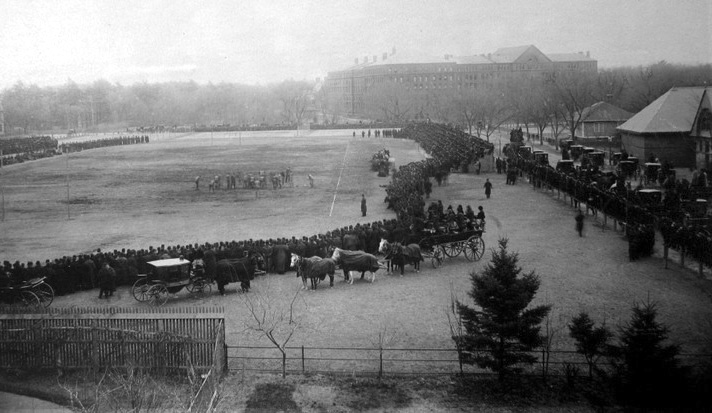
Jarvis Field

In its first few decades, the team played at several venues around Cambridge and Boston. Besides occasionally using sites on Cambridge Common or Boston Common, the school had regular venues on campus. It spent its first two seasons (1865–1866) playing at the Delta, where Memorial Hall currently stands. From 1867 to 1883, the team's main venue was Jarvis Field, which Harvard also used for football at the time. From 1884 to 1897, the baseball team used Holmes Field, which also doubled as one of Harvard's early football venues.

=== Soldier's Field / Joseph J. O'Donnell Field ===
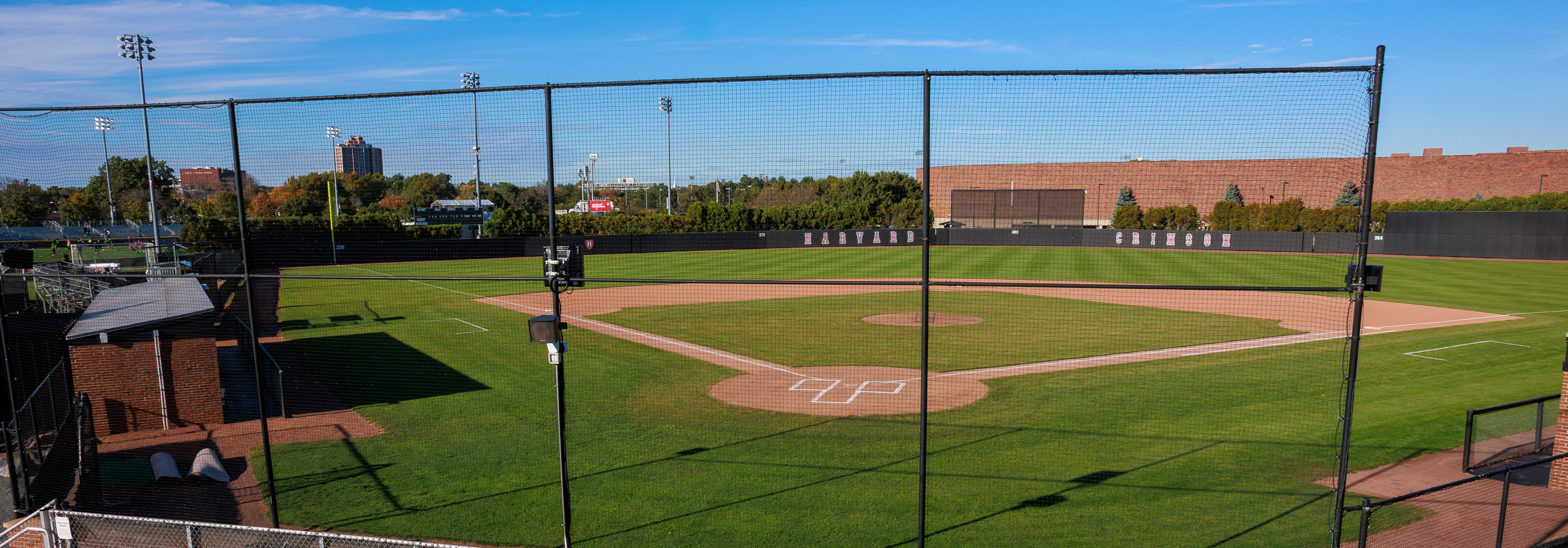
Joseph J. O'Donnell Field

In 1890, Major Henry Lee Higginson donated a parcel of land on the Allston-Brighton side of the Charles River for Harvard's use. Higginson dedicated the site Soldier's Field, for six of his friends who had died fighting in the Civil War. For the start of the 1898 season, the baseball program moved to the site and shared the venue with the football and track and field teams. The venue's first game came on April 27, 1898. Harvard defeated Dartmouth, 13–7.

On May 4, 1997, the stadium was rededicated for Joseph J. O'Donnell, a Harvard alumnus, donor, and former baseball and football player. The venue has a capacity of 1,600 spectators.

== Head coaches ==
From the program's inception at the start of the 1865 season through the end of the 1899 season, the program did not have a head coach and was instead led by its captains. In the 1900 season, E. H. Nichols became the program's first head coach. Frank Sexton, who held the position from 1911–1914, was the team's first professional coach. The position became a full-time position beginning with the 1996 season, thanks to a $2.5 million endowment from program alumnus Joseph O'Donnell.

In the early years of the position, men commonly held it for only one season. (Prior to the 1930s, the position was held for a single season 11 times.) Since then, however, five men have coached the team for at least a decade: Fred Mitchell, Norman Shepard, Loyal K. Park, Alex Nahigian, and Joe Walsh. Walsh, who was the program's head coach for 17 seasons (1996–2012), served the longest tenure of any coach in program history and is also its wins leader, with 347.

Tenure(s)	Coach	Seasons	W-L-T	Pct
1865–1899	None	35	582–307–10	.653
1900–1901, 1905 (Note: Nichols and Murphy were co-head coaches during the 1905 season, and Harvard's 19–5–1 record in that season is credited to both coaches.)	E. H. Nichols	3	53–13–1	.799
1902	Archibald Galbraith	1	21–3	.875
1903	Barrett Wendell Jr.	1	19–5	.792
1904	Orville Frantz	1	17–5	.773
1905	Thomas F. Murphy	1	19–5–1	.780
1906	Paul N. Coburn	1	12–12	.500
1907–1910	Louis Pieper	4	47–36–2	.565
1911–1914	Frank Sexton	4	64–32–2	.663
1915	Percy Haughton	1	23–7	.767
1916, 1926–1938	Fred Mitchell	14	226–140–6	.617
1918–1919	Hugh Duffy	2	8–21	.276
1920–1924	Jack Slattery	5	75–53–2	.585
1925	Eddie Mahan	1	9–14	.391
1939–1943, 1946	Floyd Stahl	6	54–69	.439
1947–1948	Adolph Samborski	2	24–24–1	.500
1949–1954	Stuffy McInnis	6	47–64–1	.424
1955–1968	Norman Shepard	14	218–107–4	.669
1969–1978	Loyal K. Park	10	248–93	.727
1979–1990	Alex Nahigian	12	249–152–3	.620
1991–1995	Leigh Hogan	5	82–101–1	.448
1996–2012	Joe Walsh	17	347–388–2	.471
2013–present	Bill Decker	12	177–192	.373
TOTALS	24	157	2601–1888–35	.579

=== Current coaching staff ===
Harvard's coaching staff for the 2025 Season consisted of head coach Bill Decker and assistant coaches Nate Cole, Kyle Decker, Michael Slattery, and Morgan Brown.

==== Bill Decker ====
Bill Decker has been the program's head coach since the start of the 2013 season. A 1984 graduate of Ithaca College, Decker's coaching career began with assistant positions at Division III schools Wesleyan (CT) and Macalester. After these, he was named the head coach at Trinity (CT) for the start of the 1991 season. Decker spent 22 seasons at Trinity, compiling a 529–231 record. He was named New England Coach of the Year and NESCAC Coach of the Year four times each. Under him, Trinity appeared in nine NCAA tournaments and won five NESCAC Tournament titles. In the 2008 season, the team nearly went undefeated, in the end finishing at 45–1 and winning the Division III National Championship.

== Yearly records ==
The following is a table of the program's yearly records. From its inception at the start of the 1865 season through the end of the 1899 season, the teams had no head coaches and were instead led by captains. The university did not sponsor a program in 1917, because of World War I, or from 1944–1945, because of World War II.

Record table
Season	Coach	Overall	Conference	Standing	Postseason
Independent (1865–1916)
1865		6–0			
1866		6–8			
1867		11–2			
1868		11–1			
1869		18–6			
1870		34–9–1			
1871		11–7			
1872		7–4			
1873		3–9			
1874		9–8			
1875		5–8			
1876		25–12			
1877		23–12–1			
1878		24–7–1			
1879		11–15–2			
1880		13–18			
1881		13–8			
1882		17–14			
1883		12–16			
1884		18–9			
1885		27–1			
1886		26–6–1			
1887		15–6			
1888		21–4			
1889		12–16			
1890		20–12			
1891		20–11			
1892		34–5			
1893		27–5–3			
1894		19–10			
1895		13–15			
1896		16–13			
1897		16–9			
1898		21–10–1			
1899		18–11			
1900	E. H. Nichols	16–6			
1901	E. H. Nichols	18–2			
1902	Archibald Galbraith	21–3			
1903	Barrett Wendell Jr.	19–5			
1904	Orville Frantz	17–5			
1905	Thomas F. Murphy, E. H. Nichols	19–5–1			
1906	Paul N. Coburn	12–12			
1907	Louis Pieper	15–7			
1908	Louis Pieper	11–12–1			
1909	Louis Pieper	13–6			
1910	Louis Pieper	8–11–1			
1911	Frank Sexton	17–6			
1912	Frank Sexton	12–10–1			
1913	Frank Sexton	15–9–1			
1914	Frank Sexton	20–7			
1915	Percy Haughton	23–7			
1916	Fred Mitchell	22–3–1			
No program (1917)
Independent (1918–1932)
1918	Hugh Duffy	1–8			
1919	Hugh Duffy	7–13			
1920	Jack Slattery	12–11–2			
1921	Jack Slattery	18–8			
1922	Jack Slattery	19–8			
1923	Jack Slattery	14–13			
1924	Jack Slattery	12–13			
1925	Eddie Mahan	9–14			
1926	Fred Mitchell	15–7			
1927	Fred Mitchell	25–6–1			
1928	Fred Mitchell	18–10			
1929	Fred Mitchell	17–8–1			
1930	Fred Mitchell	10–14			
1931	Fred Mitchell	14–11			
1932	Fred Mitchell	16–6			
Independent:		1067-573-20			
Eastern Intercollegiate Baseball League (1933–1942)
1933	Fred Mitchell	10–11	5–6	4th	
1934	Fred Mitchell	20–17–1	6–5	3rd	
1935	Fred Mitchell	16–9–1	8–4	2nd	
1936	Fred Mitchell	16–10	8–4	t-1st	
1937	Fred Mitchell	13–14–1	8–4	t-2nd	
1938	Fred Mitchell	14–14	8–4	2nd	
1939	Floyd Stahl	16–10	9–3	1st	
1940	Floyd Stahl	8–18	3–8	6th	
1941	Floyd Stahl	7–18	4–8	t-5th	
1942	Floyd Stahl	9–9	5–5	2nd	
Independent (1943)
1943	Floyd Stahl	9–5			
No program (1944–1945)
Independent (1946)
1946	Floyd Stahl	5–9			
Independent:		14–14			
Eastern Intercollegiate Baseball League (1947–1992)
1947	Adolph Samborski	12–13	7–5	t-2nd	
1948	Adolph Samborski	12–11–1	2–4	9th	
1949	Stuffy McInnis	10–12	5–4	t-4th	
1950	Stuffy McInnis	9–6	5–2	4th	
1951	Stuffy McInnis	7–9	3–5	7th	
1952	Stuffy McInnis	6–11–1	2–6	5th (North)	
1953	Stuffy McInnis	8–11	4–5	t-6th	
1954	Stuffy McInnis	7–15	3–5	7th	
1955	Norman Shepard	18–5	8–1	1st	
1956	Norman Shepard	18–6	5–4	t-4th	
1957	Norman Shepard	15–7–1	6–3	t-4th	
1958	Norman Shepard	14–8–1	7–0	1st	
1959	Norman Shepard	16–9	4–5	t-6th	
1960	Norman Shepard	9–13–1	3–5	7th	
1961	Norman Shepard	10–11	2–4	7th	
1962	Norman Shepard	19–4	7–2	t-2nd	
1963	Norman Shepard	17–6	5–4	t-5th	
1964	Norman Shepard	21–2–1	9–0	1st	
1965	Norman Shepard	12–11	5–4	t-4th	
1966	Norman Shepard	15–9	3–6	t-7th	
1967	Norman Shepard	15–7	5–3	t-4th	
1968	Norman Shepard	19–9	8–1	1st	College World Series
1969	Loyal K. Park	13–8	4–4	t-5th	
1970	Loyal Park	24–7	10–4	t-2nd	
1971	Loyal Park	27–8	9–5	1st	College World Series
1972	Loyal Park	30–9	10–4	t-1st	NCAA Regional
1973	Loyal Park	35–5	11–2	1st	College World Series
1974	Loyal Park	31–11	10–4	t-1st	College World Series
1975	Loyal Park	25–10	7–3	t-3rd	
1976	Loyal Park	17–18	4–10	t-8th	
1977	Loyal Park	22–7	7–3	4th	
1978	Loyal Park	24–10	11–3	1st	NCAA Regional
1979	Alex Nahigian	22–14	9–5	4th	
1980	Alex Nahigian	24–12	10–4	t-1st	NCAA Regional
1981	Alex Nahigian	17–14	6–7	t-5th	
1982	Alex Nahigian	17–16	9–9	t-3rd	
1983	Alex Nahigian	27–8–1	15–3–1	1st	NCAA Regional
1984	Alex Nahigian	28–6	14–3	1st	NCAA Regional
1985	Alex Nahigian	29–9	15–3	t-1st	EIBL Tiebreaker
1986	Alex Nahigian	19–11	10–8	t-3rd	
1987	Alex Nahigian	19–7	12–4	3rd	
1988	Alex Nahigian	16–18	9–9	t-5th	
1989	Alex Nahigian	16–17–1	9–9	t-5th	
1990	Alex Nahigian	15–20–1	9–9	6th	
1991	Leigh Hogan	21–19	9–9	6th	
1992	Leigh Hogan	20–15	8–6	3rd	
EIBL:		956–604–12	399–259–1		
Ivy League (1993–present)
1993	Leigh Hogan	18–20	12–8	2nd (Rolfe)	
1994	Leigh Hogan	13–22–1	7–13	t-3rd (Rolfe)	
1995	Leigh Hogan	10–25	6–14	4th (Rolfe)	
1996	Joe Walsh	23–17	14–6	1st (Rolfe)	Ivy Championship Series
1997	Joe Walsh	34–16	18–2	1st (Rolfe)	NCAA Regional
1998	Joe Walsh	36–12	16–4	1st (Rolfe)	NCAA Regional
1999	Joe Walsh	28–20	17–3	1st (Rolfe)	NCAA Regional
2000	Joe Walsh	18–25	10–10	3rd (Rolfe)	
2001	Joe Walsh	18–26	11–9	3rd (Rolfe)	
2002	Joe Walsh	20–26	13–7	t-1st (Rolfe)	NCAA Regional
2003	Joe Walsh	20–23	11–9	1st (Rolfe)	Ivy Championship Series
2004	Joe Walsh	21–18–1	13–7	2nd (Rolfe)	
2005	Joe Walsh	29–17	15–5	1st (Rolfe)	NCAA Regional
2006	Joe Walsh	21–20–1	14–6	1st (Rolfe)	Ivy Championship Series
2007	Joe Walsh	18–18	12–7	2nd (Rolfe)	
2008	Joe Walsh	10–30	8–12	4th (Rolfe)	
2009	Joe Walsh	13–28	10–10	t-3rd (Rolfe)	
2010	Joe Walsh	17–26	10–10	t-2nd (Rolfe)	
2011	Joe Walsh	9–36	5–15	4th (Rolfe)	
2012	Joe Walsh	12–30	8–12	2nd (Rolfe)	
2013	Bill Decker	10–31	7–13	3rd (Rolfe)	
2014	Bill Decker	11–28	5–15	4th (Rolfe)	
2015	Bill Decker	18–24	7–13	t-3rd (Rolfe)	
2016	Bill Decker	17–24	9–11	4th (Rolfe)	
2017	Bill Decker	17–24	9–11	3rd (Rolfe)	
2018	Bill Decker	22–20	12-9	3rd (Rolfe)	
2019	Bill Decker	25–14	14-7	1st (Rolfe)	
Ivy League:		508–620–3	293–248		
Total:		2544-1811-35			
National champion Postseason invitational champion Conference regular season champion Conference regular season and conference tournament champion Division regular season champion Division regular season and conference tournament champion Conference tournament champion

== Notable former players ==
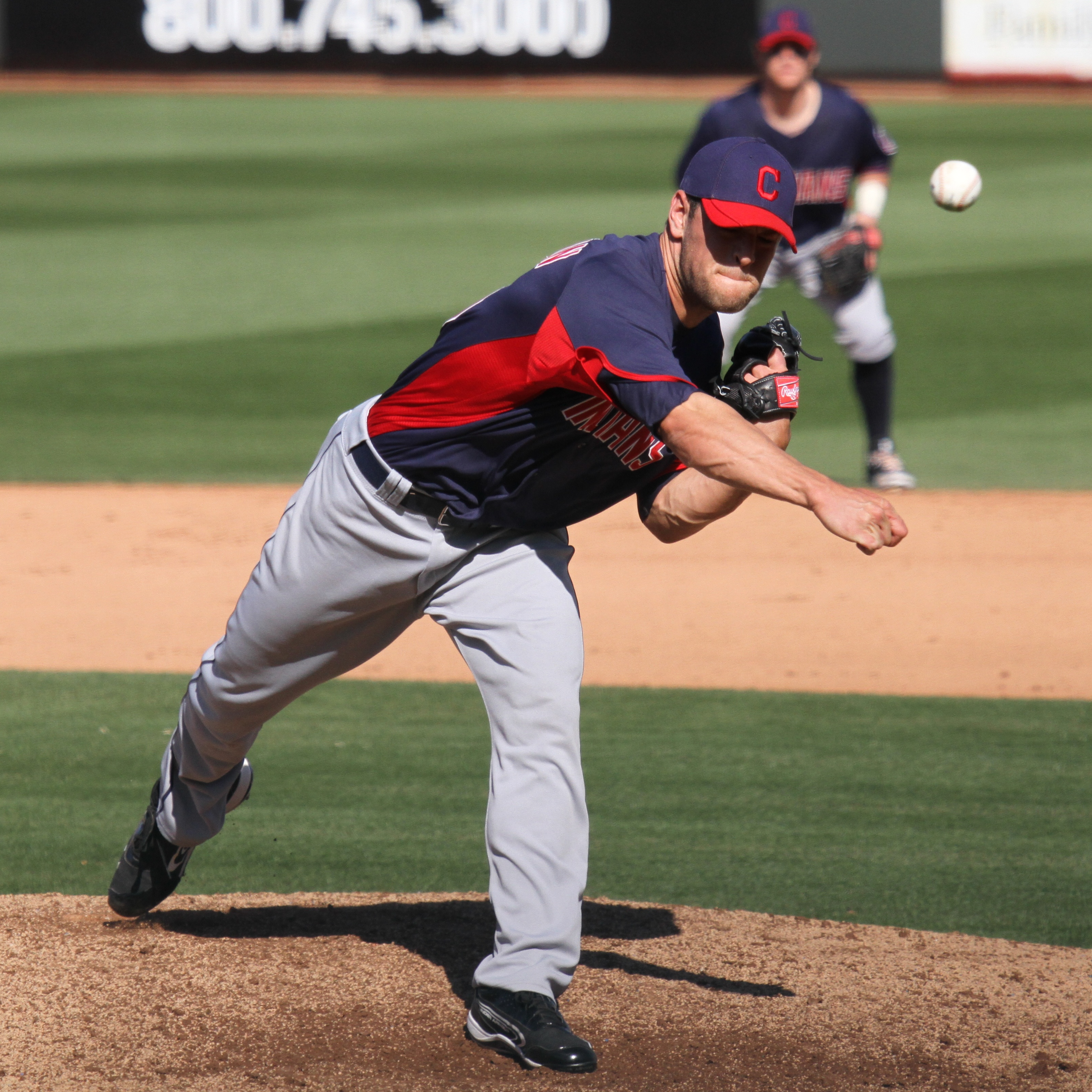
Frank Herrmann, while pitching for the MLB's Cleveland Indians.

The following is a list of notable former Crimson players and the seasons in which they played for the program, where available.

- Hunter Bigge (2017-2019)
- John Chase (1926–28)
- Walter Clarkson (1898–1903)
- Jocko Conlon (1922)
- Charlie Devens (1930, 1932)
- David Forst (1994–98)
- Erwin Gehrke
- Brent Suter (2009-2012)
- Tanner Anderson (2011-2015)
- Shawn Haviland (2004-2008)
- Percy Haughton (1899)
- Frank Herrmann (2003–05)
- Michael Hill (1990–93)
- Robert Kernan
- Tony Lupien (1937–39)
- Eddie Mahan (1914–16)
- Saul Mariaschin
- William Clarence Matthews (1902–05)
- Robert McKay (1911)
- Jeff Musselman (1982–85)
- George Owen (1923)
- Ray Peters (1967–68)
- Sean Poppen (2013-2016)
- Jack Robinson (1899–1902)
- Mike Stenhouse (1977–79)
- Jim Tyng (1873–79)
- Pete Varney (1968–71)
- Barrett Wendell Jr. (1902)
- Rick Wolff (1970–72)

== Major League Baseball draft ==
As of January 2026, 65 players have been drafted to MLB from the Harvard Baseball program.

== Rivalry with Yale ==
=== History ===
Harvard's baseball program has a long history in the school's rivalry with Yale University. Overall, Harvard has a 194–178–1 record against Yale, whom they have played more than any other team.

The two schools' first athletic competition was a crew race in 1852– the United States' first intercollegiate athletic competition. Harvard first played Yale's baseball program on July 25, 1868. The Crimson won, 25–17, and went on to win the teams' first eight meetings. Yale won five of the next seven, including a 5–0 win in 1877 in which pitcher Charles Carter threw what later became known as a perfect game.

The two teams have played in nearly every season since, with a few exceptions. In 1891, Yale refused on account of Harvard's refusal to play Princeton in 1890 and 1891. The rivalry also was not played in 1917, 1944, or 1945, when Harvard did not sponsor a team due to the World Wars.

In the late 19th and early 20th centuries, baseball games between Harvard and Yale attracted much attention. At the end of each season, the teams played two games, one each in Cambridge and New Haven; if the teams split these games, a third was scheduled to decide that year's champion. In 1913, for example, when Yale won 2–0 in New Haven and Harvard won 4–3 in Cambridge, a third game was scheduled at Ebbets Field, the home field of Major League Baseball's Brooklyn Dodgers; Harvard won, 6–5. The games regularly drew crowds of over 10,000. The 1913 championship game at Ebbets saw an attendance mark of 15,000; a June 23, 1908, game (which Harvard lost 3–0) was attended by 14,000 spectators, including Secretary of War William Howard Taft, a Yale alumnus who had unofficially been named the Republican nominee for president only days earlier.

The two teams became conference rivals in the Eastern Intercollegiate Baseball League after Harvard joined for the 1933 season. Both teams were competitive in the league– Harvard won 21 titles, while Yale won 10. The teams finished 1–2 in the league standings five times (1937, 1947, 1955, 1980, and 1984). In 1980, the two teams met in the EIBL tiebreaker with an NCAA tournament bid at stake; Harvard swept Yale in two games, 11–3 and 6–2, to advance.

Since the two teams began competing in the Rolfe Division in 1993, the teams have finished 1–2 in the division standings four times. In those four seasons, Yale won the division once (in 1993), while Harvard won it the other three times (1996, 1997, and 1998).

=== Format ===
The format of the team's yearly meetings has changed frequently. From 1868–1871, the teams played only a single game. The home-and-home format popular for much of the rivalry's early history was adopted in 1872, and the tiebreaker game was played, as necessary, starting in 1877. The home-and-home format was stretched to four games during several seasons in the late-19th century, with a fifth, tie-breaking game played on multiple occasions. When Harvard joined the EIBL for the 1933 season, the tiebreaker format was scrapped. From 1935–1940, the teams instead played a regularly scheduled third game in New London, Connecticut, on the same day as the Harvard–Yale Regatta. The rivalry's schedule became irregular during the years of World War II. Following the war, formats varied until the schools began playing a regular three-game series in 1954. The rivalry consisted of three-game series from 1954–1960, two-game series from 1961–1966, and a mix of single games and doubleheaders from 1967–1980. In the last years of the EIBL (1981–1992), the two teams played one doubleheader each season, alternating home teams between seasons. Since the Ivy League began sponsoring baseball in 1993, Harvard and Yale have played a yearly four-game series, held entirely at one school, as part of Rolfe Division play.

== Popular culture ==
=== "Call Me Maybe" video ===
During the 2012 season, the program received attention from national media outlets for a YouTube video in which members of the team dubbed the Carly Rae Jepsen song "Call Me Maybe." The video, filmed during a van ride to a road game, was viewed 2 million times in the five days after its release and led to many imitations by other sports teams. The video was choreographed and directed by senior pitcher Connor Hulse. Eight players appeared in the video: in the front row, from left to right, senior catcher Jon Smart and junior pitcher Joey Novak; in the middle row, sophomore pitcher Andrew Ferreira, senior first baseman/pitcher Marcus Way, and junior second baseman Kyle Larrow; in the back row, sophomore outfielder Jack Colton (who was asleep), senior infielder/catcher Jeff Reynolds, sophomore catcher/first baseman Steve Dill and cameraman Connor Hulse.

=== The Little Book ===
In the 2008 Selden Edwards novel The Little Book, protagonist Wheeler Burden plays baseball for Harvard in the early 1960s.

== See also ==
- List of NCAA Division I baseball programs
