= Orville Frantz =

American college baseball player and coach

Biographical details
- Born: August 1, 1876; Roanoke, Illinois, U.S.
- Died: July 14, 1961 (aged 84); Tulsa, Oklahoma, U.S.
- Education: Harvard College

Playing career
- 1901: Harvard

Coaching career (HC unless noted)
- 1903: Harvard (Freshmen)
- 1904: Harvard

Head coaching record
- Overall: 17–5

Orville Gish "Home Run" Frantz (August 1, 1876 – July 14, 1961) was an American baseball player who played for and coached for the Harvard Crimson baseball team.

== Early life ==
Frantz was born in Roanoke, Illinois on August 1, 1876 to Henry Jackson and Maria Jennie (Gish) Frantz. He attended Wellington High School in Wellington, Kansas, where he played one season of baseball.

== Harvard ==
Frantz entered Harvard College in 1898. He played second base for the freshman baseball team in 1899 and made the varsity team in 1901. He started the season at second base, but was moved to first base by Captain Bill Reid. Known for his power hitting, he earned the nickname "Home Run Frantz". He was described by sportswriter Charles E. Patterson as "the finest college first baseman seen in many a day. He is of ideal build for the place, can take anything that comes along, high or low, straight or wide, and hits the ball a mile". He was named to Outing magazine's 1901 All-America team. That fall, Frantz was chosen to direct cheering and singing in the student section during Harvard Crimson football games. He also served as president of the Harvard YMCA, chairman of the university's Bible study and religious meetings committees, and was credited by Henry Lee Higginson with making the new Harvard Union a success.

Prior to the 1902 season, two of Frantz's teammates, Tom Murphy and I. F. Story, were declared ineligible because they played summer league baseball. After reading the eligibility rules, Frantz informed the Harvard Athletic Commission that he had received $36 from a team in Winfield, Kansas in 1895 to cover his expenses, including board. The athletic commission chose to suspend him for at least one season. In January 1903, it was announced that his suspension was permanent. He instead coached the freshman baseball team.

Frantz earned his bachelor's degree from Harvard College in 1903. Despite having average grades, he was accepted to Harvard Law School. He was head coach of Harvard's baseball team in 1904 and led the Crimson to a 17–5 record.

Despite only playing one season for the Crimson, Frantz was elected to the Harvard Varsity Club Hall of Fame in 1967.

== Later life ==
In 1906, Frantz left Harvard to serve as private secretary to his brother, Frank Frantz, who was the governor of Oklahoma Territory.

Prior to its inaugural season, the newly-formed South Central League offered Frantz the figurehead position of league president. He declined, but accepted an offer to be a hands-off vice president. He became president on May 26, 1906, after J. M. McAllister resigned to become manager of the Shawnee Blues. Frantz resigned on June 14 and was succeeded by P. D. Harper. The league folded after one season and was replaced by the Oklahoma–Arkansas–Kansas League.

In 1908, Frank and Orville Frantz purchased the 50,000-acre Prince Ranch, located 75-miles south of San Antonio. They resold the property in small tracts.

In 1917, Frantz and Walter E. Templeman incorporated the Labette Oil Company, with Frantz serving as president and treasurer. The company held leases on 2,500 acres in Labette County, Kansas, one mile south of Mound Valley, Kansas. In 1920, they organized the Templeman Oil Corp, which was headquartered in Denver and controlled acreage in Texas, Oklahoma, Kansas, Louisiana, Arkansas, Wyoming, and Montana.

Frantz died in Tulsa, Oklahoma on July 14, 1961.
