= Frank Sexton (baseball) =

American baseball player and coach (1872–1938)

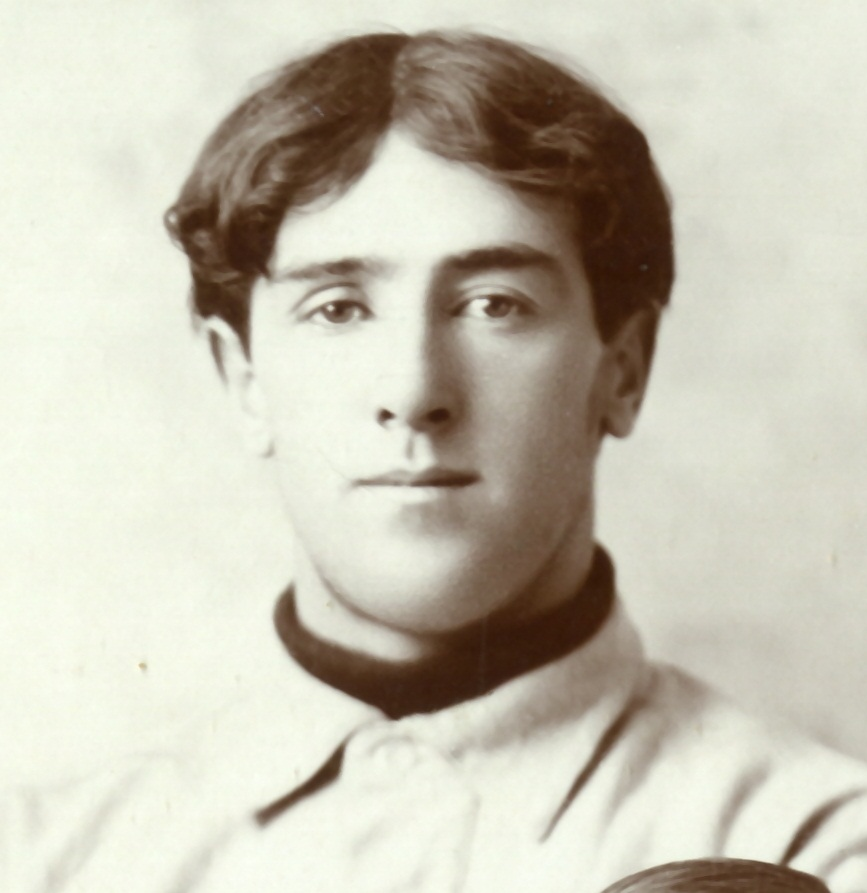
- Frank Sexton of the Michigan Wolverines baseball team, 1895
- Pitcher
- Born: July 8, 1872; Brockton, Massachusetts, U.S.
- Died: January 4, 1938 (aged 65); Brighton, Massachusetts, U.S.
- Batted: Unknown Threw: Unknown

MLB debut
- June 21, 1895, for the Boston Beaneaters

Last MLB appearance
- August 17, 1895, for the Boston Beaneaters

MLB statistics
- Win–loss record: 1–5
- Earned run average: 5.69
- Strikeouts: 14
- Stats at Baseball Reference

Teams
- Boston Beaneaters (1895)

Frank Joseph Sexton (July 8, 1872 – January 4, 1938) was an American baseball player and coach. He played college baseball for Brown University

from 1890 to 1893 and for the University of Michigan in 1894. He also played professional baseball from 1890 to 1897, including one season in Major League Baseball as a pitcher for the Boston Beaneaters. He later coached college baseball at the University of Michigan (1896, 1901–1902), Brown University (1903–1910) and Harvard University (1911–1915). He also maintained a medical practice at Brookline, Massachusetts for many years.

== Early years ==
Sexton was born in Brockton, Massachusetts in either 1868 or 1872. He was the son of Irish immigrants, John and Catherine (Comvory) Sexton. He attended Brockton High School and next enrolled at Amherst College in 1888. Sexton transferred to Brown University for the 1889–1890 academic year as a member of Brown's freshman class. He was a senior at Brown during the 1893–1894 academic year. At Brown, Sexton "won fame both as a pitcher and fielder" for the school's baseball team. In 1890, he won his first seven games at Brown, striking out 98 and allowing only 17 hits in the seven games. He played at both pitcher, second base and center field at Brown. His battery-mate was Fred Tenney, who became a well-known first baseman in Major League Baseball. Sexton played on the Brown baseball team for four years (1890–1893) and was the team captain and coach in 1892 and 1893. He graduated from Brown in 1893.

== Professional baseball ==
Sexton appears to have made his professional baseball debut in Canada, playing for the Shamrocks, a team sponsored by the Shamrock Athletic Association in Saint John, New Brunswick. According to one account of the early days of professional baseball in Saint John, the Shamrocks went shopping for a new pitcher in 1890: "They obtained the services of F.J. Sexton from Brown University. Sexton was a superb pitcher and received the princely salary of $150 a month" In August 1890, Sexton helped lead the Shamrocks to the 1890 pennant with a 2–0 victory over the Saint John Athletic Association.

Sexton also played in the New England League for teams in Woonsocket and Pawtucket, Rhode Island in 1891 and 1892, for New Bedford in 1893, and for his hometown team, the Brockton Shoemakers, in 1894.

During the 1895 season, Sexton played Major League Baseball as a pitcher for the Boston Beaneaters where he was re-united with his battery-mate from Brown, Fred Tenney. In his Major League debut on June 21, 1895, Sexton allowed only two earned runs, but the Beaneaters were defeated by Brooklyn by a score of 4–2. The Boston Daily Globe reported on Sexton's debut: "Frank J. Sexton made his first appearance with the Boston club and pitched a first-class game, while Tenney, his old catcher, handled him in fine style." In his second start on June 25, 1895, Sexton got the win in a 5–2 victory over the New York Giants. The Boston Daily Globe praised Sexton's performance:

"Frank Sexton faced the Giants for the first time, and simply toyed with them, that, too, without using much speed. Five singles and one double were made by the visitors, and except for an excusable error by Long in the first inning, the Giants would have left town last evening with a shutout. Tenney and Sexton worked well, the latter holding his man at first in fine style and pitching a cool, heady game. As both Tenney and Sexton can hit and run, it made Boston by all odds the fastest nine ever put on a ball field."

Sexton played in his final Major League game two months later on August 17, 1895. He appeared in seven games for Boston and compiled a record of one win and five losses with a 5.69 earned run average. A history of the Boston baseball club published in 1897 noted that the club had signed several new pitchers in 1895, seeking to overcome the weak showing of the 1894 pitching staff. In the end, the author wrote of the new twirlers: "Stocksdale, Wilson, Yerrick and Sexton were more or less frosts, and were pitched in but few games."

In 1896, Sexton played for the Springfield Ponies in the Eastern League. He concluded his career as a professional baseball player with the New Bedford Whalers. During the 1896 and 1897 seasons, he was one of the stars of the New England League, "batting well and leading in the fielding of the league."

== Baseball coach ==
=== Michigan ===
Sexton attended the University of Michigan from 1894 to 1896 as a student in the Department of Medicine and Surgery. In February 1895, The Michigan Alumnus announced, "F.G. [sic] Sexton, Brown University's crack pitcher is a student here this year and will help with the nine." He joined the Michigan Wolverines baseball team as a pitcher in 1895. He pitched an 11–0 shutout against Cornell during the 1895 season. It was at the conclusion of Michigan's 1895 baseball season that Sexton signed with the Boston Beaneaters.

At the conclusion of his brief Major League Baseball career, Sexton returned to Michigan as a medical student. In January 1896, The Michigan Alumnus announced: "Sexton, who pitched last season and who was change pitcher on the Boston league team last summer, has been engaged as coach and will not try for his old position." He reportedly agreed to coach the school's baseball team to meet the cost of his education. During the 1896 season, Sexton led the Wolverines to a 17–4–1 record. He became involved in a controversy resulting from an 1896 baseball game against Indiana at Bloomington. The Michigan Alumnus reported on the incident as follows:

"In the second half of the seventh inning, with the score 11–11, one man out and another on base, the Indiana pitcher gave out and the captain noticed this and gave his umpire the tip to call the game, which he did, giving darkness as his reason, though the teams might easily have played a half hour or more longer. Sexton, who was umpiring for Michigan, remonstrated at this, but the Indiana team left the field, giving Sexton the opportunity to declare the game forfeited to Michigan with a score of 9 to 0."

After the game, an angry Indiana crowd closed around Sexton, and one man drew a knife on him. When the Michigan team retreated to its hotel, the crowd followed and "again opened the dispute with Sexton." When one of the men raised his cane to strike Sexton, Sexton "got him by the throat", another rushed to his help, and the Michigan players eventually pushed the fighters to the sidewalk. A warrant was issued for Sexton's arrest, but he had already left for the train. When the Indiana captain mistakenly identified one of Michigan's players, Holmes, as Sexton, Holmes was arrested and later sued for false imprisonment. The Michigan Alumnus summarized the incident: "The affair is unfortunate and greatly to be regretted, yet few who know the facts will blame the Michigan men for defending themselves."

Sexton transferred to the University of Pennsylvania in 1896 and received a Doctor of Medicine degree in June 1898. He then established a medical practice in Boston. While developing his practice, he played baseball in the summer of 1900 for the "Roses", a professional baseball team in Saint John, New Brunswick.

In 1901, Sexton agreed to take time away from his medical practice to coach the Michigan baseball team. An article in Ann Arbor's The Weekly Bulletin in April 1902 noted the Wolverines' good fortune in securing Sexton's services:

"He located near Boston, where he has a good practice now. His love for baseball, however, prompted him to respond to the urgent demands of the Michigan management for his services as coach last year, as well as for this year. Michigan ought to be very grateful to Dr. Sexton for thus bestowing his time and attention to the baseball team."

Sexton's contract required him to serve as coach from April to the beginning of June. He led the 1901 team to a 13–8 record. He returned to Michigan again as coach of the 1902 team, which compiled a record of 8–10. In June 1902, Sexton returned to his medical practice in North Easton, Massachusetts.

=== Brown ===
Frank Sexton, c. 1915

While continuing his medical practice, Sexton served as the baseball coach at his alma mater, Brown University. He was the baseball coach at Brown for eight years from 1903 to 1910. During his years as a baseball coach at Brown, his teams "always ranked among the best in college baseball" and finished in first place among the Eastern college teams in his last three years as coach. He led the 1907 Brown baseball team to a perfect 21–0 record. In 1907, the Brown Alumni Monthly noted:

"Very much of this year's creditable showing is due to Frank J. Sexton, the coach, who has a great faculty for the developing of new baseball material. He has been in charge of the team two years, and we sincerely hope he will continue in charge next season. He knows the men thoroughly, is intensely interested in them, and has the advantage of being a former Brown player himself."

The Evening News of Providence, Rhode Island also praised his work at Brown: "[T]he teams that Dr. Sexton has brought out at Brown always have been good ones, and ones having a splendid idea of how baseball should be played. Sexton has developed many good players for his teams, always has put the boys on their own initiative in the games and has been a strict disciplinarian." Brown continued to practice medicine while coaching at Brown.

=== Harvard ===
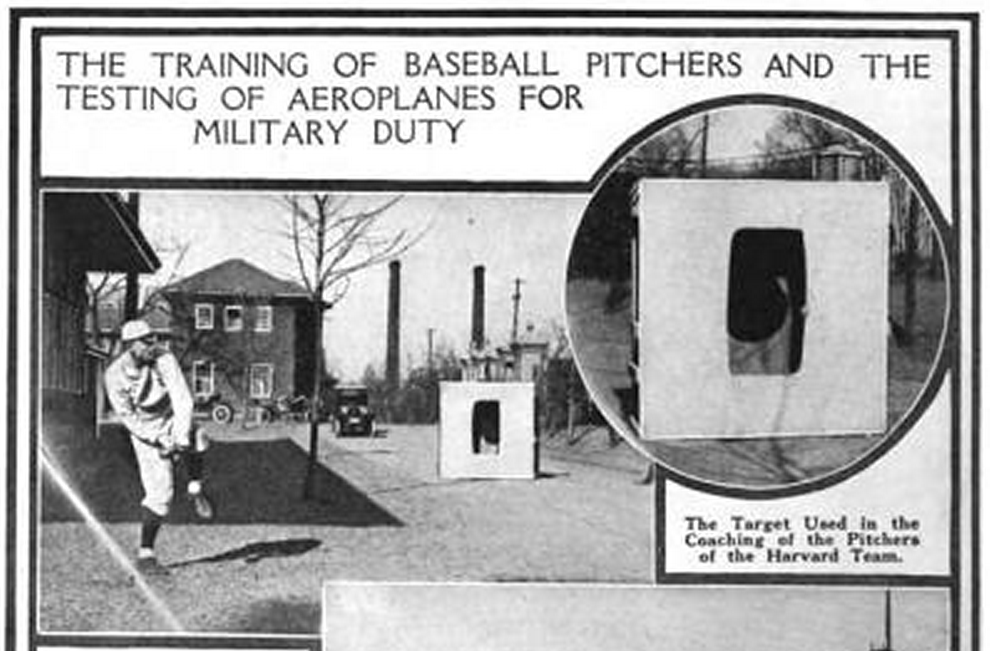
Testing device used by Sexton to train Harvard's pitchers

In December 1910, Sexton was hired as the baseball coach at Harvard University. He was the school's first paid, professional baseball coach. Upon his arrival, Sexton promptly instituted a new training regimen, requiring the pitchers and catchers to do daily work on the gymnasium apparatus for a month before regular practice began. Sexton told the press that the work would get their arms in shape "to avoid strains and other hurts when they begin throwing the ball around." In early March 1911, Sexton signed a two-year contract agreeing to coach the Harvard baseball team through the 1912 season.

In Sexton's first year at Harvard, the baseball team had its best record since 1901, winning 17 games and losing 6. Sexton coached at Harvard for five years from 1911 to 1915. While coaching at Harvard, Sexton drew attention for his innovative training techniques. In addition to his requiring the battery candidates to work on the gymnasium apparatus, he instituted a rigorous program of fall practice for the baseball team. Sexton told the press "there will be no let-up until they are driven to shelter by the cold weather." In 1915, a publication known as The World's Advance profiled a new target device used by Sexton in the training of Harvard's pitching staff.

While Sexton was at Harvard, the baseball team played an annual game against the Boston Red Sox. Although the Harvard team lost the game each year during Sexton's tenure, the scores were relatively close: 4–1 in 1910, 4–2 in 1911, 2–0 in 1912 and 5–0 in 1913.

In May 1915, Sexton resigned after a disagreement with the Harvard Advisory Baseball Committee. Sexton said that he resigned because of interference from the Advisory Committee with his work as coach. The dispute followed a decision by the committee to hire two former Harvard players as assistant coaches to work with the catchers and outfielders. In a letter published by The Boston Evening Transcript, Sexton wrote that he did not agree to the many suggestions of the committee and concluded, "After full consideration of the matter discussed, I felt I could not retain my self-respect and esteem owing to their persistent interference and continue as coach of the Harvard University baseball team." The Evening Transcript wrote that Sexton was "considered one of the most efficient in the country" and opined that he "has been a good coach for Harvard and has developed some excellent teams from very ordinary material." The paper also reported that "the players and the college in general have been very much upset over the resignation of Dr. Sexton."

Sexton filed a lawsuit against the president and fellows of Harvard in May 1916 for breach of contract, claiming that he had not been fully paid the amounts owed under his contract. Sexton sought $2,000 in unpaid salary and claimed that the Harvard Athletic Committee had interfered with his coaching and had no right to do so. During a jury trial in March 1917, Sexton gave a demonstration of his methods, placing a handkerchief on the floor as home plate, and explaining the position from which he wanted the catcher to throw the ball. Sexton testified that the person who the Athletic Committee sought to impose as an assistant coach wanted to override his instruction to the catchers. The jury ultimately returned a verdict in favor of Harvard.

== Later years ==
After resigning as Harvard's coach in 1915, Sexton returned to his medical practice. He also served with the rank of captain in the U.S. Army Medical Corps during World War I. At the time of the 1920 Census, Sexton was living at 1032 Commonwealth Avenue in Brookline, Massachusetts with his wife Louise (age 44). They had no children at that time, and Sexton's occupation was listed as a physician in general practice. In 1922, he continued to maintain a private medical practice in Brookline.

He died at his home in either Brookline or Brighton, Massachusetts in January 1938. The cause of death was cerebral embolus and arteriosclerosis.
