= List of Oklahoma Sooners head baseball coaches =

The Oklahoma Sooners baseball program is a college baseball team that represents the University of Oklahoma. The team has had eleven head coaches since organized baseball began 1898. The current head coach is Skip Johnson who was hired in 2018.

In those seasons, five coaches have won conference championships with the Sooners: Bill Owen, Lawrence Haskell, Jack Baer, Enos Semore and Larry Cochell. Two coaches have won national championships: Baer and Cochell. Semore is the all-time leader in games coached, years coached and wins. Owen is the overall leader in winning percentage. Baer has the lowest winning percentage.

== Key ==
General
#	Number of coaches (Note: A running total of the number of coaches of the Oklahoma Sooners. Thus, any coach who has two or more separate terms as head coach is counted only once.)
GC	Games coached
†	Elected to the National College Baseball Hall of Fame

Overall
OW	Wins
OL	Losses
OT	Ties
O%	Winning percentage

Conference
CW	Wins
CL	Losses
CT	Ties
C%	Winning percentage

Postseason (Note: Postseason play involving the NCAA Division I Baseball Championship.)
PA	Total Appearances (Note: Postseason appearances include seasons with NCAA Division I Baseball Championship bids since the tournament began in 1947.)
PW	Total Wins
PL	Total Losses
WA	College World Series appearances (Note: College World Series appearances include seasons with CWS bids since the tournament began in 1947.)
WW	College World Series wins
WL	College World Series losses

Championships
DC	Division regular season
CC	Conference regular season
CT	Conference tournament (Note: The Big Eight Conference began a baseball tournament in 1976. The Big 12 Conference began a baseball tournament in 1997.)

== Coaches ==
List of head baseball coaches showing season(s) coached, overall records, conference records, postseason records, championships and selected awards*Statistics correct as of the end of the 2019 NCAA Division I baseball season
#	Name	Term (Note: Oklahoma did not sponsor a baseball team in 1901–1903, 1908, 1917 and 1943–1945.)	GC	OW	OL	OT	O%	CW	CL	CT	C%	PA	PW	PL	WA	WW	WL	DCs	CCs	CTs	NCs	Awards (Note: National, regional and conference coach of the year awards.)
1	No coach	1898–1900, 1904–05	24	10	13	1	.438	—	—	—	—	—	—	—	—	—	—	—	—	—	—	—
2	Bennie Owen	1906–1922	250	142	104	4	.576	—	—	—	—	—	—	—	—	—	—	—	—	—	—	—
3	Bill Owen	1923–1926	55	42	13	0	.764	18	5	0	.783	—	—	—	—	—	—	—	2 – 1925, 1926	—	—	—
4	Lawrence Haskell	1927–1941	252	176	74	2	.702	89	29	1	.752	—	—	—	—	—	—	—	8 – 1927, 1930, 1931, 1933, 1935, 1936, 1939, 1940	—	—	—
5	Jack Baer	1942–1967	531	281	250	0	.529	192	136	0	.585	5			1			—	6 – 1946, 1947, 1950, 1953, 1955, 1956	—	1 – 1951	National (1951)
6	Enos Semore	1968–1989	1222	851	370	1	.697	297	129	0	.697				5			—	5 – 1972, 1973, 1974, 1975, 1986	2 – 1977, 1979	—	—
7	Stan Meek	1990	57	31	26	0	.544	9	15	0	.375	—	—	—	—	—	—	—	—	—	—	—
8	Larry Cochell	1991–2005	848	511	336	1	.603	223	163	1	.578	9	0	0	3	0	0	—	—	1 – 1997	1 – 1994	National (1994)
9	Sunny Golloway	2005–2013	510	334	175	1	.656	61	55	1	.526	8	0	0	1	0	0	—	—	—	—	—
10	Pete Hughes	2014–2017	236	128	107	1	.544	44	51	1	.464	1	0	0	—	—	—	—	—	—	—	—
11	Skip Johnson	2018–present	119	71	48	0	.597	25	23	0	.521	1	0	0	0	0	0	—	0	0	0	—
