= Princeton Tigers baseball statistical leaders =

The Princeton Tigers baseball statistical leaders are individual statistical leaders of the Princeton Tigers baseball program in various categories, including batting average, home runs, runs batted in, runs, hits, stolen bases, ERA, and Strikeouts. Within those areas, the lists identify single-game, single-season, and career leaders. The Tigers represent Princeton University in the NCAA's Ivy League.

Princeton began competing in intercollegiate baseball in 1864. These lists are updated through the end of the 2025 season.

== Batting Average ==
Career
| Rk | Player | AVG | Seasons |
|---|---|---|---|
| 1 | William L. MacCoy Jr. | .380 (97-255) | 1940 1941 1942 |
| 2 | Daniel P. Arendas | .364 (202-555) | 1983 1984 1985 1986 |
| 3 | Jeffrey P. Barton | .356 (125-351) | 1986 1987 1988 1989 |
| 4 | Victor K. Kurylak | .350 (110-314) | 1977 1978 1979 |
| 5 | B.J. Szymanski | .346 (123-356) | 2003 2004 |
| 6 | Mark F. Lockenmeyer | .343 (114-332) | 1978 1979 1980 1981 |
| 7 | Todd A. Tuckner | .341 (175-513) | 1984 1985 1986 1987 |
| 8 | Joseph F. DeGeorge | .338 (117-346) | 1976 1977 1978 1979 |
| | Matthew C. Evans | .338 (164-485) | 1996 1997 1998 1999 |
| | Scott L. Bandura | .338 (70-207) | 2022 2023 |

Season
| Rk | Player | AVG | Season |
|---|---|---|---|
| 1 | Daniel P. Arendas | .440 (66-150) | 1985 |
| 2 | G. Spencer Lucian | .425 (62-146) | 2008 |
| 3 | Victor K. Kurylak | .416 (42-101) | 1978 |
| 4 | Sal J. Iacono | .413 (62-150) | 2007 |
| 5 | Max Krance | .411 (39-95) | 1998 |
| 6 | William L. MacCoy Jr. | .406 (28-69) | 1942 |
| 7 | Daniel P. Puskas | .405 (45-111) | 1993 |
| 8 | William L. MacCoy Jr. | .402 (37-92) | 1940 |
| 9 | Michael E. Ciminiello | .396 (63-159) | 1996 |
| 10 | Theodore Frangos | .392 (31-79) | 1980 |

== Home Runs ==
Career
| Rk | Player | HR | Seasons |
|---|---|---|---|
| 1 | Kyle Vinci | 30 | 2022 2023 2024 |
| 2 | Matthew C. Evans | 26 | 1996 1997 1998 1999 |
| 3 | Michael E. Ciminiello | 25 | 1993 1994 1995 1996 |
| 4 | Samuel W. Mulroy | 25 | 2009 2010 2011 2012 |
| | Matthew J. Scannell | 25 | 2022 2023 2024 |
| 6 | Timothy W. Lahey | 23 | 2001 2002 2003 2004 |
| 7 | Drew K. Stratton | 21 | 1984 1985 1986 |
| 8 | Jon A. Broscious | 20 | 2007 2008 2009 2010 |
| | Jake Koonin | 20 | 2023 2024 2025 2026 |
| 10 | Andrew Hanson | 19 | 1998 1999 2000 2001 |

Season
| Rk | Player | HR | Season |
|---|---|---|---|
| 1 | Kyle Vinci | 21 | 2023 |
| 2 | Michael E. Ciminiello | 13 | 1996 |
| 3 | Scott L. Bandura | 12 | 2023 |
| 4 | Drew K. Stratton | 11 | 1985 |
| | Timothy W. Lahey | 11 | 2003 |
| 6 | Matthew C. Evans | 10 | 1999 |
| | Nadir A. Lewis | 10 | 2022 |
| | Matthew J. Scannell | 10 | 2023 |
| 9 | Matthew C. Evans | 9 | 1998 |
| | William D. Venable | 9 | 2005 |

Single Game
| Rk | Player | HR | Season | Opponent |
|---|---|---|---|---|
| 1 | Timothy W. Lahey | 3 | 2004 | Columbia |
| 2 | 49 times | 2 | Most recent: Will Robbins, 2026 vs. Penn | |

== Runs Batted In ==
Career
| Rk | Player | RBI | Seasons |
|---|---|---|---|
| 1 | Thomas A. Hage | 128 | 1993 1994 1995 1996 |
| 2 | Max Krance | 126 | 1998 1999 2000 2001 |
| 3 | Andrew J. Salini | 122 | 2003 2004 2005 2006 |
| 4 | Matthew C. Evans | 120 | 1996 1997 1998 1999 |
| 5 | Andrew Hanson | 118 | 1998 1999 2000 2001 |
| 6 | Michael E. Ciminiello | 112 | 1993 1994 1995 1996 |
| 7 | Patrick M. Boran | 111 | 1999 2000 2001 2002 |
| 8 | Samuel W. Mulroy | 108 | 2009 2010 2011 2012 |
| 9 | Daniel P. Arendas | 107 | 1983 1984 1985 1986 |
| 10 | Michael N. Hazen | 104 | 1995 1996 1997 1998 |

Season
| Rk | Player | RBI | Season |
|---|---|---|---|
| 1 | Kyle Vinci | 61 | 2023 |
| 2 | Drew K. Stratton | 53 | 1985 |
| 3 | Thomas A. Hage | 48 | 1996 |
| | Michael E. Ciminiello | 48 | 1996 |
| | B.J. Szymanski | 48 | 2004 |
| 6 | Max Krance | 47 | 2000 |
| | Andrew Hanson | 47 | 2001 |
| 8 | Scott L. Bandura | 45 | 2023 |
| 9 | Matthew J. Scannell | 44 | 2022 |
| 10 | Sean P. Welsh | 42 | 1985 |

Single Game
| Rk | Player | RBI | Season | Opponent |
|---|---|---|---|---|
| 1 | Brendan C. Cumming | 9 | 2022 | Towson |
| 2 | Zack Belski | 8 | 2016 | Brown |
| 3 | Gerry G. Morse | 7 | 1932 | Rutgers |
| | Robert L. Peters Jr. | 7 | 1942 | Yale |
| | Anthony J. Riposta | 7 | 1972 | Temple |
| | Daniel P. Puskas | 7 | 1992 | Columbia |
| | Andrew Hanson | 7 | 2000 | Columbia |
| | William D. Venable | 7 | 2005 | Old Dominion |
| 9 | Samuel W. Mulroy | 6 | 2012 | Richmond |
| | Michael H. Ford | 6 | 2013 | Harvard |
| | David Harding | 6 | 2017 | Harvard |
| | Paul Tupper | 6 | 2017 | Cornell |
| | Scott L. Bandura | 6 | 2023 | Monmouth |
| | Jake Koonin | 6 | 2024 | VCU |

== Runs ==
Career
| Rk | Player | R | Seasons |
|---|---|---|---|
| 1 | Patrick M. Boran | 143 | 1999 2000 2001 2002 |
| 2 | Daniel P. Arendas | 141 | 1983 1984 1985 1986 |
| 3 | Andrew J. Salini | 129 | 2003 2004 2005 2006 |
| | Daniel J. DeGeorge | 129 | 2006 2007 2008 2009 |
| 5 | Timothy E. Taylor | 115 | 1991 1992 1993 1994 |
| 6 | Michael N. Hazen | 112 | 1995 1996 1997 1998 |
| 7 | Andrew Hanson | 111 | 1998 1999 2000 2001 |
| | Danny Hoy | 111 | 2013 2014 2015 2016 |
| 9 | Samuel W. Mulroy | 110 | 2009 2010 2011 2012 |
| 10 | Stephen T. Young | 108 | 2001 2002 2003 2004 |

Season
| Rk | Player | R | Season |
|---|---|---|---|
| 1 | Stephen T. Young | 47 | 2004 |
| | Daniel J. DeGeorge | 47 | 2008 |
| 3 | Patrick M. Boran | 46 | 2001 |
| | David J. Ekelund | 46 | 1996 |
| | Scott L. Bandura | 46 | 2023 |
| 6 | Daniel P. Arendas | 45 | 1985 |
| | Michael E. Ciminiello | 45 | 1996 |
| | Matthew J. Scannell | 45 | 2024 |
| 9 | B.J. Szymanski | 44 | 2004 |
| 10 | Patrick M. Boran | 42 | 2000 |
| | Brendan C. Cumming | 42 | 2022 |

Single Game
| Rk | Player | R | Season | Opponent |
|---|---|---|---|---|
| 1 | Nick DiPietrantonio | 6 | 2022 | Towson |
| 2 | Richard L. Vogt | 5 | 1928 | Swarthmore |
| | Weatherly Reinmund | 5 | 1931 | Lafayette |
| | Thomas J. Urquhart | 5 | 1984 | Long Island |
| | Patrick M. Boran | 5 | 2001 | Dartmouth |
| | Timothy W. Lahey | 5 | 2003 | Dartmouth |
| | Timothy W. Lahey | 5 | 2004 | Columbia |
| | Danny Hoy | 5 | 2016 | Brown |
| 9 | Matthew C. Bowman | 4 | 2012 | Richmond |
| | Michael H. Ford | 4 | 2013 | Harvard |
| | Jesper E. Horsted | 4 | 2018 | Georgetown |
| | Brendan C. Cumming | 4 | 2022 | Towson |
| | Kaden Kram | 4 | 2022 | Towson |
| | Jackson E. Bold | 4 | 2023 | Harvard |
| | Jake Koonin | 4 | 2024 | Brown |

== Hits ==
Career
| Rk | Player | H | Seasons |
|---|---|---|---|
| 1 | Andrew J. Salini | 203 | 2003 2004 2005 2006 |
| 2 | Patrick M. Boran | 202 | 1999 2000 2001 2002 |
| | Daniel P. Arendas | 202 | 1983 1984 1985 1986 |
| 4 | Daniel J. DeGeorge | 194 | 2006 2007 2008 2009 |
| 5 | Max Krance | 189 | 1998 1999 2000 2001 |
| 6 | Adam J. Balkan | 188 | 2002 2003 2004 2005 |
| 7 | Sal J. Iacono | 186 | 2004 2005 2006 2007 |
| 8 | Danny Hoy | 185 | 2013 2014 2015 2016 |
| 9 | Andrew Hanson | 184 | 1998 1999 2000 2001 |
| 10 | Sean R. Sullivan | 177 | 1989 1990 1991 1992 |

Season
| Rk | Player | H | Season |
|---|---|---|---|
| 1 | Brendan C. Cumming | 67 | 2022 |
| 2 | Daniel P. Arendas | 66 | 1985 |
| | Thomas A. Hage | 66 | 1996 |
| | Patrick M. Boran | 66 | 2001 |
| | Scott L. Bandura | 66 | 2023 |
| 6 | B.J. Szymanski | 64 | 2004 |
| 7 | Michael E. Ciminiello | 63 | 1996 |
| | Andrew Hanson | 63 | 2000 |
| 9 | Sal J. Iacono | 62 | 2007 |
| | G. Spencer Lucian | 62 | 2008 |

Single Game
| Rk | Player | H | Season | Opponent |
|---|---|---|---|---|
| 1 | Todd A. Tuckner | 6 | 1985 | FIU |
| | Andrew Hanson | 6 | 2000 | Columbia |
| | Max Krance | 6 | 2001 | Coastal Carolina |
| | G. Spencer Lucian | 6 | 2008 | Navy |
| 5 | 23 times | 5 | Most recent: Matt Scannell, 2024 vs. Dartmouth | |

== Stolen Bases ==
Career
| Rk | Player | SB | Seasons |
|---|---|---|---|
| 1 | Michael N. Hazen | 49 | 1995 1996 1997 1998 |
| 2 | John T. Rivers | 47 | 1990 1991 1992 1993 |
| 3 | Stephen T. Young | 40 | 2001 2002 2003 2004 |
| 4 | Thomas J. Urquhart | 38 | 1983 1984 1985 1986 |
| 5 | Patrick M. Boran | 37 | 1999 2000 2001 2002 |
| 6 | Jeffrey C. Schweitzer | 36 | 1990 1991 1992 1993 |
| | Justin C. Griffin | 36 | 1995 1996 1997 1998 |
| | Jason M. Koonin | 36 | 1996 1997 1998 1999 |
| | Derek A. Beckman | 36 | 2006 2007 2008 2009 |
| 10 | Frank J. Biondi Jr. | 35 | 1964 1965 1966 |

Season
| Rk | Player | SB | Season |
|---|---|---|---|
| 1 | David J. Ekelund | 24 | 1993 |
| | Michael N. Hazen | 24 | 1998 |
| 3 | John R. Cullinane Jr. | 21 | 1973 |
| 4 | Thomas J. Urquhart | 20 | 1985 |
| 5 | John T. Rivers | 18 | 1993 |
| 6 | Michael N. Hazen | 17 | 1997 |
| | Patrick M. Boran | 17 | 2001 |
| | Grant Werdesheim | 17 | 2026 |
| 9 | Jason M. Koonin | 16 | 1998 |
| 10 | Edward J. Kuchar | 15 | 1976 |
| | Stephen T. Young | 15 | 2004 |
| | Will D. Venable | 15 | 2004 |
| | Scott L. Bandura | 15 | 2023 |

Single Game
| Rk | Player | SB | Season | Opponent |
|---|---|---|---|---|
| 1 | Robert Hinchman | 4 | 1938 | Fairleigh Dickinson |
| | John R. Cullinane Jr. | 4 | 1973 | Villanova |
| | John T. Rivers | 4 | 1993 | Lafayette |
| | Patrick M. Boran | 4 | 2002 | Rutgers |
| | Derek A. Beckman | 4 | 2008 | Monmouth |

== Earned Run Average ==
Career
| Rk | Player | ERA | Seasons |
|---|---|---|---|
| 1 | David M. Sisler | 1.39 | 1951 1952 |
| 2 | James C. Gibson Jr. | 1.51 | 1954 1955 1956 |
| 3 | Joseph L. Castle | 1.59 | 1952 1953 1954 |
| 4 | Frank R. Reichel | 1.77 | 1949 1950 1951 |
| 5 | Harry P. Brightman | 1.82 | 1950 1951 1952 |
| 6 | Michael B. French | 1.91 | 1974 1975 1976 |
| 7 | Graham P. Marcott | 1.97 | 1965 1966 1967 |
| 8 | Edward J. Seaman | 2.11 | 1956 1957 1958 |
| 9 | Richard B. Emery | 2.16 | 1953 1954 1955 |
| 10 | Stephen M. Cushmore | 2.28 | 1966 1967 1968 |

Season
| Rk | Player | ERA | Season |
|---|---|---|---|
| 1 | Mark F. Lockenmeyer | 0.33 | 1978 |
| 2 | John S. Redpath Jr. | 0.96 | 1965 |
| 3 | Michael H. Ford | 0.98 | 2013 |
| 4 | David M. Sisler | 1.00 | 1951 |
| 5 | Carl D. Hunter | 1.08 | 1969 |
| 6 | James C. Gibson Jr. | 1.27 | 1955 |
| 7 | Thomas E. Pauly | 1.30 | 2002 |
| 8 | David M. Sisler | 1.32 | 1952 |
| 9 | Richard B. Emery | 1.35 | 1953 |
| 10 | Edward J. Seaman | 1.37 | 1957 |
| | Graham P. Marcott | 1.37 | 1965 |

== Strikeouts ==
Career
| Rk | Player | K | Seasons |
|---|---|---|---|
| 1 | Michael J. Fremuth | 233 | 1967 1968 1969 |
| 2 | Mark D. Softy | 217 | 1974 1975 1976 |
| 3 | Stephen M. Cushmore | 201 | 1966 1967 1968 |
| 4 | Zachary D. Hermans | 195 | 2010 2011 2012 2013 |
| 5 | Erik P. Stiller | 192 | 2003 2004 2005 2006 |
| 6 | Ryan K. Quillian | 191 | 1999 2000 2001 2002 2003 |
| 7 | C. Ross Ohlendorf | 178 | 2002 2003 2004 |
| 8 | Bradley Gemberling | 177 | 2006 2007 2008 2009 |
| 9 | Steven F. Kordish | 176 | 1980 1981 1982 1983 |
| 10 | Harry P. Brightman | 167 | 1950 1951 1952 |

Season
| Rk | Player | K | Season |
|---|---|---|---|
| 1 | Mark D. Softy | 95 | 1976 |
| 2 | Stephen M. Cushmore | 91 | 1968 |
| 3 | Michael J. Fremuth | 89 | 1968 |
| 4 | Steven F. Kordish | 86 | 1983 |
| 5 | C. Ross Ohlendorf | 79 | 2004 |
| 6 | Mike Fagan | 77 | 2014 |
| 7 | Ryan Smith | 76 | 2019 |
| 8 | Robert W. Wolcott Jr. | 74 | 1949 |
| | Mark D. Softy | 74 | 1974 |
| | Thomas E. Pauly | 74 | 2003 |

Single Game
| Rk | Player | K | Season | Opponent |
|---|---|---|---|---|
| 1 | L.A. Young | 17 | 1890 | Lafayette |
| | L.A. Young | 17 | 1891 | Lafayette |
| 3 | R.F. Easton | 16 | 1896 | Yale |
| 4 | David M. Sisler | 14 | 1952 | Navy |
| | Richard B. Emery | 14 | 1955 | Army |
| | Zachary D. Hermans | 14 | 2012 | Cornell |
| 7 | 10 times | 13 | Most recent: Jackson Emus, 2022 vs. VCU | |
