= 1951 College Baseball All-America Team =

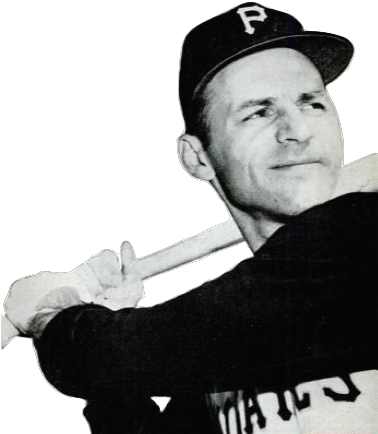
1951 All-Americans included eight-time MLB All Star Dick Groat

This is a list of college baseball players named first team All-Americans for the 1951 NCAA baseball season. From 1947 to 1963, the American Baseball Coaches Association was the only generally recognized All-America selector, so any player selected by the ABCA is considered a "consensus" All-American.

== Key ==
| A | American Baseball Coaches Association |
| | Member of the National College Baseball Hall of Fame |
| | Consensus All-American – selected the ABCA |

== All-Americans ==
| Position | Name | School | # | A |
|---|---|---|---|---|
| Pitcher | Don Barnett | Fresno State | 1 | ✓ |
| Pitcher | Pat Hubert | Texas A&M | 1 | ✓ |
| Catcher | Joseph Buck | Oklahoma A&M | 1 | ✓ |
| First baseman | Sylvester McNinch | California | 1 | ✓ |
| Second baseman | James Cleverly | Utah | 1 | ✓ |
| Shortstop | Dick Groat | Duke | 1 | ✓ |
| Third baseman | Dick Raklovits | Illinois | 1 | ✓ |
| Outfielder | Earl Averill Jr. | Oregon | 1 | ✓ |
| Outfielder | Stewart Hein | Ohio State | 1 | ✓ |
| Outfielder | Ray Van Cleef | Rutgers | 1 | ✓ |

== See also ==
- List of college baseball awards
