= 1951 Texas A&M Aggies baseball team =

American college baseball season

1951 Texas A&M Aggies baseball

Southwest Conference co-champions District VI Playoff champions

College World Series, T-5th
- Conference: Southwest Conference
- Record: 21–11 (11–4 SWC)
- Head coach: Beau Bell (1st season)
- Captain: Guy Wallace
- Home stadium: Kyle Baseball Field

1951 Southwest Conference baseball standings
	Conf.				Overall
Team	W		L	PCT	W		L	PCT
Texas A&M ‍†‍‍^{y}	11	–	4	.733	21	–	11	.656
Texas ‍‍‍	11	–	4	.733	17	–	6	.739
TCU ‍‍‍	8	–	7	.533	10	–	11	.476
SMU ‍‍‍	6	–	9	.400	10	–	12	.455
Baylor ‍‍‍	6	–	9	.400	10	–	10	.500
Rice ‍‍‍	3	–	12	.200	8	–	13	.381
† – Conference champion y – Invited to the College World Series; As of June 30, 1951; Rankings from Collegiate Baseball

The 1951 Texas A&M Aggies baseball team represented Texas A&M University in the 1951 NCAA baseball season. The Aggies played their home games at Kyle Baseball Field. The team was coached by Beau Bell in his 1st year at Texas A&M.

The Aggies won the District VI playoff to advance to the College World Series, where they were defeated by the Utah Redskins.

== Roster ==
1951 Texas A&M Aggies baseball team
Players
Coaches

#	Pos.	Name	B/T	Height	Weight	Year	Home town
	OF	Hollis Baker	/	—	—
		Sam Blanton	/	—	—
	P	George Brown	/	—	—
	INF	Hank Candelari	R/R	—	—
	OF	John DeWitt	R/	—	—
	INF	Jim Dishman	/	—	—
	INF	Joe Ecrette	/R	—	—
	RHP	Sid Goodloe	/R	—	—
	C	Martin Hamilton	/	—	—
	RHP	Pat Hubert	R/R	5 ft 10 in (1.78 m)	165 lb (75 kg)
	INF	Jerry Lastelick	/	—	—
2	OF	Yale Lary	R/R	5 ft 11 in (1.8 m)	185 lb (84 kg)		Fort Worth, Texas
	OF	Bill McPherson	R/	—	—
7	INF	Bill Munnerlyn	/L	—	—
4	C	Al Ogletree	R/R	—	—		San Antonio, Texas
	RHP	Bob Tankersley	/R	—	—
		Blanton Taylor	R/	—	—
1	INF	Guy Wallace (C)	/R	—	—	Sr

Head coach

Beau Bell

Assistant coach(es)

Legend

- (C) Team captain
- (S) Suspended
- (I) Ineligible
- Injured
- Current redshirt

== Schedule ==
1951 Texas A&M Aggies baseball game log
Regular season
March (6–4)

#	Date	Opponent	Site/stadium	Score	Overall record	SWC record
1	March 2	B. A. M. C.	Kyle Baseball Field • College Station, Texas	8–7	1–0	–
2	March 3	B. A. M. C.	Kyle Baseball Field • College Station, Texas	1–2	1–1	–
3	March 14	Houston	Kyle Baseball Field • College Station, Texas	3–1	2–1	–
4	March 17	at Houston	Buffalo Stadium • Houston, Texas	3–7	2–2	–
5	March 20	Sam Houston State	Kyle Baseball Field • College Station, Texas	16–8	3–2	–
6	March 22	at B. A. M. C.	Unknown • San Antonio, Texas	4–12	3–3	–
7	March 23	at B. A. M. C.	Unknown • San Antonio, Texas	10–3	4–3	–
8	March 28	Minnesota	Kyle Baseball Field • College Station, Texas	2–0	5–3	–
9	March 29	Minnesota	Kyle Baseball Field • College Station, Texas	0–1	5–4	–
10	March 31	El Dorado Oilers	Kyle Baseball Field • College Station, Texas	7–4	6–4	–

April (6–4)

#	Date	Opponent	Site/stadium	Score	Overall record	SWC record
11	April 3	Baylor	Kyle Baseball Field • College Station, Texas	2–3	6–5	0–1
12	April 6	SMU	Kyle Baseball Field • College Station, Texas	3–0	7–5	1–1
13	April 7	SMU	Kyle Baseball Field • College Station, Texas	3–0	8–5	2–1
14	April 9	TCU	Kyle Baseball Field • College Station, Texas	4–5	8–6	2–2
15	April 14	Rice	Kyle Baseball Field • College Station, Texas	7–2	9–6	3–2
16	April 17	at Sam Houston State	Unknown • Huntsville, Texas	13–3	10–6	3–2
17	April 21	at Texas	Clark Field • Austin, Texas	10–14	10–7	3–3
18	April 27	at TCU	Unknown • Fort Worth, Texas	6–7	10–8	3–4
19	April 28	at TCU	Unknown • Fort Worth, Texas	8–1	11–8	4–4
20	April 30	at SMU	Unknown • Dallas, Texas	5–4	12–8	5–4

May (6–0)

#	Date	Opponent	Site/stadium	Score	Overall record	SWC record
21	May 4	at Baylor	Unknown • Waco, Texas	9–0	13–8	6–4
22	May 5	at Baylor	Unknown • Waco, Texas	12–6	14–8	7–4
23	May 11	at Rice	Unknown • Houston, Texas	13–2	15–8	8–4
24	May 12	at Rice	Unknown • Houston, Texas	16–9	16–8	9–4
25	May 17	Texas	Kyle Baseball Field • College Station, Texas	4–2	17–8	10–4
26	May 18	Texas	Kyle Baseball Field • College Station, Texas	4–1	18–8	11–4

Postseason
District VI Tournament (2–1)

#	Date	Opponent	Site/stadium	Score	Overall record	SWC record
27	May 23	at Arizona	UA Field • Tucson, Arizona	5–4	19–8	11–4
28	May 24	at Arizona	UA Field • Tucson, Arizona	4–21	19–9	11–4
29	May 25	at Arizona	UA Field • Tucson, Arizona	14–2	20–9	11–4

College World Series (1–2)

#	Date	Opponent	Site/stadium	Score	Overall record	SWC record
30	June 13	vs Springfield	Omaha Municipal Stadium • Omaha, Nebraska	1–5	20–10	11–4
31	June 14	vs Ohio State	Omaha Municipal Stadium • Omaha, Nebraska	3–2	21–10	11–4
32	June 15	vs Utah	Omaha Municipal Stadium • Omaha, Nebraska	8–15	21–11	11–4

== Awards and honors ==
Hank Candelari

- All-Southwest Conference

John DeWitt

- All-Southwest Conference

Pat Hubert

- First Team All-American
- All-Southwest Conference

Yale Lary

- All-Southwest Conference

Al Ogletree

- All-Southwest Conference

Guy Wallace

- All-Southwest Conference
