= Pete Carlston =

American athletics coach (1911–1992)

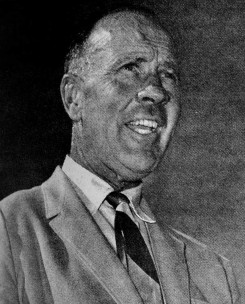
- Carlston, c. 1968

Biographical details
- Born: February 3, 1911; Fairview, Utah, U.S.
- Died: April 27, 1992 (aged 81); Salt Lake City, Utah, U.S.
- Education: Utah (1934)

Playing career

Football
- 1931–1933: Utah
- Position: End

Coaching career (HC unless noted)

Football
- 1937–1938: Westminster (UT)
- 1939–1941: Mesa (CO)
- 1946–1949: Utah (freshmen)

Basketball
- 1939–1942: Mesa (CO)

Baseball
- 1950–1953: Utah

Swimming
- 1947–1954: Utah

Track
- 1965–1979: Utah

Head coaching record
- Overall: 39–27 (college baseball)

Peter LeRoy Carlston (February 3, 1911 – April 27, 1992) was an American football, basketball, baseball, golf, swimming, wrestling, and track and field coach. He also served as a lieutenant commander in the United States Navy during World War II.

== Playing career ==
Carlston lettered at end for the University of Utah from 1931 to 1933, before graduating in 1934.

== Early coaching career ==
Carlston served as a football coach at Westminster College in Salt Lake City, Utah and Mesa Junior College in Colorado, as well as serving as Mesa's head men's basketball coach.

== Utah baseball ==
Carlston was the head baseball coach at his alma mater, the University of Utah, from 1950 to 1953. His 1951 squad placed third at the 1951 College World Series.

== Head coaching record ==
=== College baseball ===
Record table
| Season | Team | Overall | Conference | Standing | Postseason |
|---|---|---|---|---|---|
Utah Redskins (Skyline Conference) (1950–1953)
| 1950 | Utah | 3–5 | – | (West) | |
| 1951 | Utah | 17–3 | – | 1st (West) | College World Series |
| 1952 | Utah | 8–9 | – | (West) | |
| 1953 | Utah | 11–10 | – | (West) | |
| Utah: | | 39–27 | – | | |
| Total: | | 39–27 | | | |
National champion Postseason invitational champion Conference regular season champion Conference regular season and conference tournament champion Division regular season champion Division regular season and conference tournament champion Conference tournament champion
