= Archie Allen =

American baseball player and coach (1913–2006)

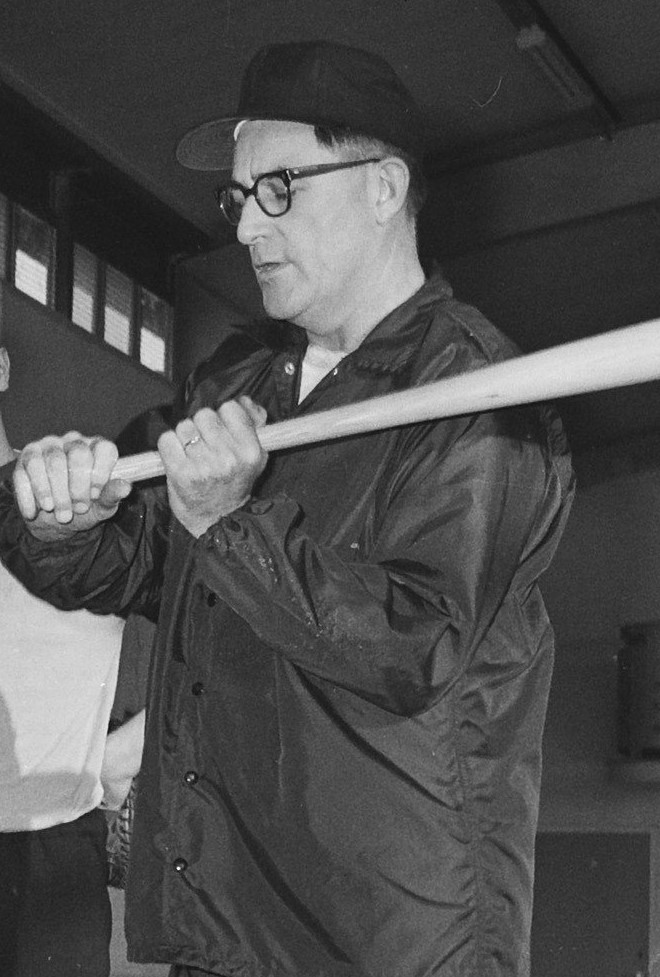
- Allen coaching in 1962

Biographical details
- Born: March 18, 1913; Pittsfield, Massachusetts, U.S.
- Died: November 1, 2006 (aged 93)
- Education: Springfield College

Playing career
- 1934–1936: Springfield College
- 1937: Norfolk Tars
- 1938–1940: Binghamton Triplets
- 1940: Scranton Red Sox
- 1940: Norfolk Tars
- 1940: Tulsa Oilers
- Position: Outfielder

Coaching career (HC unless noted)
- 1947: Springfield College (Asst.)
- 1948–1978: Springfield College
- 1963-1964: Dutch national baseball team

Head coaching record
- Overall: 454–257–7

Baseball career
Medals
Men's baseball
Manager of United States
Pan American Games
Silver medal – second place	1963 Pan American Games	Team
Manager of Netherlands
European Baseball Championship
Gold medal – first place	1964 European Championship	Team

Archie Patrick Allen (born March 18, 1913 – November 1, 2006) was an American college baseball coach, serving primarily as head coach of the Springfield College team from 1948 to 1978. He also managed the United States and Netherlands national baseball teams.

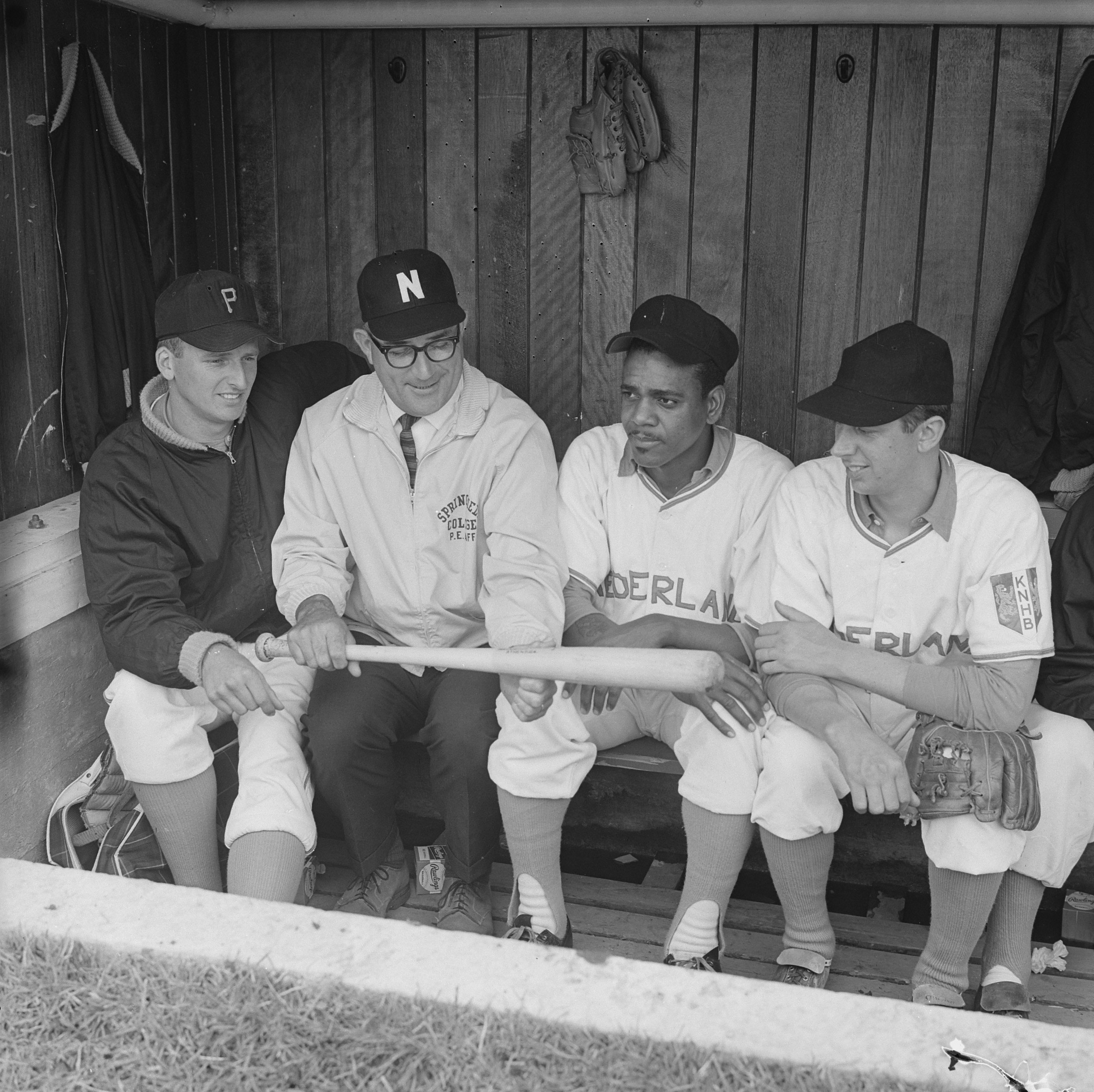
Allen coaching the Dutch national team in the 1964 European Baseball Championship.

== Playing career ==
After 3 seasons as an outfielder at Springfield College, Allen played professionally for the Norfolk Tars, Binghamton Triplets, Scranton Red Sox, and Tulsa Oilers from 1937 to 1940.

== Coaching career ==
After coaching in high school, Allen joined John Bunn's coaching staff at Springfield College.

Allen also coached the U.S. national team, finishing second at the 1963 Pan Am Games. and Netherlands national team, leading the Dutch to the 1964 European Baseball Championship title.

Allen was inducted into the American Baseball Coaches Association Hall of Fame in 1973.

== Post-coaching career ==
In 1983, Allen served as commissioner of the Cape Cod Baseball League, a collegiate summer baseball league in Massachusetts.

Allen died in 2006.

== Head coaching record ==
Record table
Season	Team	Overall	Conference	Standing	Postseason
Springfield Pride (Independent) (1948–1978)
1948	Springfield	8–13			
1949	Springfield	13–4			
1950	Springfield	9–7			
1951	Springfield	16–7			1951 College World Series
1952	Springfield	11–4			
1953	Springfield	16–5			
1954	Springfield	15–3			NCAA Baseball tournament
1955	Springfield	14–7			1955 College World Series
1956	Springfield	7–11			NCAA Baseball tournament
1957	Springfield	11–10			NCAA Baseball tournament
1958	Springfield	15–3			
1959	Springfield	11–6–1			
1960	Springfield	11–5–1			
1961	Springfield	15–6			
1962	Springfield	9–11			
1963	Springfield	8–12			
1964	Springfield	9–13			
1965	Springfield	10–11–1			
1966	Springfield	13–7–1			
1967	Springfield	14–7			
1968	Springfield	18–11–1			
1969	Springfield	27–7			
1970	Springfield	20–9–1			1970 Division II College World Series
1971	Springfield	22–6–1			
1972	Springfield	19–5			
1973	Springfield	17–10			
1974	Springfield	11–14			
1975	Springfield	19–7			
1976	Springfield	21–12			
1977	Springfield	19–10			
1978	Springfield	26–14			
Springfield:		84–58–1			
Total:		454–257–7			
National champion Postseason invitational champion Conference regular season champion Conference regular season and conference tournament champion Division regular season champion Division regular season and conference tournament champion Conference tournament champion
