= 1951 Tennessee Volunteers baseball team =

American college baseball season

1951 Tennessee Volunteers baseball

SEC Champions

College World Series, Runner-Up
- Conference: Southeastern Conference

Ranking
- Coaches: No. 2
- CB: No. 2
- Record: 20–3 (16–1 SEC)
- Head coach: S. W. Anderson (4th season)
- Home stadium: Lower Hudson Field

1951 Southeastern Conference baseball standings
	Conf.						Overall
Team	W		L		T	PCT	W		L		T	PCT
Tennessee ‍†‍‍^{y}	16	–	1	–	0	.941	20	–	3	–	0	.870
Alabama ‍‍‍	13	–	4	–	1	.750	17	–	5	–	1	.761
Ole Miss ‍‍‍	10	–	4	–	0	.714	15	–	4	–	0	.789
Florida ‍‍‍	9	–	7	–	0	.563	16	–	9	–	0	.640
LSU ‍‍‍	6	–	6	–	0	.500	10	–	6	–	0	.625
Auburn ‍‍‍	8	–	8	–	0	.500	14	–	11	–	0	.560
Tulane ‍‍‍	7	–	9	–	0	.438	10	–	11	–	0	.476
Mississippi State ‍‍‍	6	–	9	–	0	.400	11	–	9	–	0	.550
Georgia Tech ‍‍‍	8	–	12	–	0	.400	11	–	12	–	0	.478
Kentucky ‍‍‍	5	–	9	–	1	.367	8	–	10	–	1	.447
Georgia ‍‍‍	6	–	11	–	0	.353	12	–	13	–	0	.480
Vanderbilt ‍‍‍	0	–	13	–	1	.036	0	–	18	–	1	.026
x – Division champion y – Invited to the College World Series; As of June 18, 1951; Rankings from Coaches' Poll

The 1951 Tennessee Volunteers baseball team represented the University of Tennessee Volunteers in the 1951 NCAA baseball season. The Volunteers played their home games at Lower Hudson Field. The team was coached by S. W. Anderson in his 4th season at Tennessee.

The Volunteers finished second in the College World Series, defeated by the Oklahoma Sooners in the championship game.

== Roster ==
1951 Tennessee Volunteers roster
Pitchers: Billy Joe Bowman; Sidney Hatfield; John Huffstetler; Billy Joe O’Kain	Catchers: Andy Anderson; Mike Overbey; Infielders: Watson Bell; Julian Dease; Billy Dodds; Jim Gillespie; B. B. Hopkins; Herky Payne; Dale Powell	Outfielders: Ace Adams; Bill Asbury; Bert Rechichar; Unknown: R. L. Maples

== Schedule and results ==
Legend
Tennessee Volunteers win
Tennessee Volunteers loss

1951 Tennessee Volunteers baseball game log
Regular season (16–1)

March (1–1)
Date	Opponent	Site/stadium	Score	Overall record	SEC record
March 15	at Florida	Perry Field • Gainesville, FL	W 12–6	1–0	1–0
March 16	at Florida	Perry Field • Gainesville, FL	L 3–15	1–1	1–1

April (9–0)
Date	Opponent	Site/stadium	Score	Overall record	SEC record
April 4	at Georgia Tech	Rose Bowl Field • Atlanta, GA	W 15–11	2–1	2–1
April 5	at Georgia Tech	Rose Bowl Field • Atlanta, GA	W 12–11	3–1	3–1
April 6	at Georgia	Ag. Hill • Athens, GA	W 5–4	4–1	4–1
April 11	Georgia Tech	Lower Hudson Field • Knoxville, TN	W 2–1	5–1	5–1
April 14	Georgia	Lower Hudson Field • Knoxville, TN	W 6–1	6–1	6–1
April 14	Georgia	Lower Hudson Field • Knoxville, TN	W 2–1	7–1	7–1
April 18	Vanderbilt	Lower Hudson Field • Knoxville, TN	W 17–0	8–1	8–1
April 23	Florida	Lower Hudson Field • Knoxville, TN	W 5–3	9–1	9–1
April 24	Florida	Lower Hudson Field • Knoxville, TN	W 3–2	10–1	10–1

May (6–0)
Date	Opponent	Site/stadium	Score	Overall record	SEC record
May 1	Vanderbilt	Lower Hudson Field • Knoxville, TN	W 20–2	11–1	11–1
May 2	Vanderbilt	Lower Hudson Field • Knoxville, TN	W 7–6	12–1	12–1
May 4	at Kentucky	Unknown • Lexington, KY	W 8–0	13–1	13–1
May 5	at Kentucky	Unknown • Lexington, KY	W 9–2	14–1	14–1
May 11	Kentucky	Lower Hudson Field • Knoxville, TN	W 2–1	15–1	15–1
May 12	Kentucky	Lower Hudson Field • Knoxville, TN	W 11–2	16–1	16–1

Postseason (4–2)

1951 College World Series (4–2)
Date	Opponent	Site/stadium	Score	Overall record	CWS record
June 13	vs Utah	Omaha Municipal Stadium • Omaha, NE	L 1–7	16–2	0–1
June 14	vs Princeton	Omaha Municipal Stadium • Omaha, NE	W 3–2	17–2	1–1
June 15	vs Springfield	Omaha Municipal Stadium • Omaha, NE	W 2–0	18–2	2–1
June 16	vs USC	Omaha Municipal Stadium • Omaha, NE	W 9–8	19–2	3–1
June 16	vs Utah	Omaha Municipal Stadium • Omaha, NE	W 5–4	20–2	4–1
June 17	vs Oklahoma	Omaha Municipal Stadium • NE	L 2–3	20–3	4–2

Schedule source:

== Awards and honors ==
Sidney Hatfield

- College World Series Most Outstanding Player

Herky Payne

- American Baseball Coaches Association Second Team All-American

Bert Rechichar

- All-Southeastern Conference

Andy Anderson

- All-Southeastern Conference

John Huffstetler

- All-Southeastern Conference
