= 1951 Oklahoma Sooners baseball team =

American college baseball season

1951 Oklahoma Sooners baseball

National champions Big Seven Conference champions
- Conference: Big Eight Conference
- Record: 19–9 (10–1 Big Seven)
- Head coach: Jack Baer (7th year)
- Home stadium: Haskell Park

1951 Big Seven Conference baseball standings
	Conf.				Overall
Team	W		L	PCT	W		L	PCT
Oklahoma ‍†‍‍^{y}	10	–	1	.909	19	–	9	.679
Missouri ‍‍‍	9	–	4	.692	12	–	6	.667
Nebraska ‍‍‍	5	–	4	.556	10	–	5	.667
Colorado ‍‍‍	3	–	5	.375		–		–
Kansas ‍‍‍	5	–	9	.357	6	–	9	.400
Kansas State ‍‍‍	5	–	10	.333	5	–	10	.333
Iowa State ‍‍‍	3	–	7	.300	8	–	7	.533
† – Conference champion y – Invited to the College World Series; As of June 30, 1951; Rankings from Collegiate Baseball

The 1951 Oklahoma Sooners baseball team represented the University of Oklahoma in the 1951 NCAA baseball season. The team was coached by Jack Baer in his 7th season at Oklahoma.

The Sooners won the College World Series, defeating the Tennessee Volunteers in the championship game.

== Roster ==
1951 Oklahoma Sooners roster
Pitchers: Floyd Murphy; Jack Shirley; James Waldrip; Catchers: John Reddell; Kenneth Stonecipher	Infielders: William Harrah; Ray Morgosh; Gene Sheets; Gene Stafford; Joe Straka; Roger Wich; Outfielders: James Antonio; Phil McKee; Charles Pugsley	Position Unknown: Joe Burke; John Davis; Edward Ignace; Edwin Sandel; Jack Van Pool

== Schedule ==
Legend
Oklahoma win
Oklahoma loss

1951 Oklahoma Sooners baseball game log
Postseason

District playoffs
Date	Opponent	Site/stadium	Score	Overall record	Playoff record
	vs. Houston		W 5–2	13–9	1–0
	vs. Houston		W 6–5	14–9	2–0
	vs. Houston		W 2–1	15-9	3–0

1951 College World Series
Date	Opponent	Site/stadium	Score	Overall record	CWS record
June 13	vs. Ohio State	Omaha Municipal Stadium • Omaha, NE	W 9–8	16–9	1–0
June 14	vs. Springfield	Omaha Municipal Stadium • Omaha, NE	W 7–1	17–9	2–0
June 15	vs. Southern California	Omaha Municipal Stadium • Omaha, NE	W 4–1	18–9	3–0
June 17	vs. Tennessee	Omaha Municipal Stadium • Omaha, NE	W 3–2	19–9	4–0

== Awards and honors ==
Jack Shirley

- All-America Second Team
