= Emerson Dickman =

American baseball player (1914–1981)

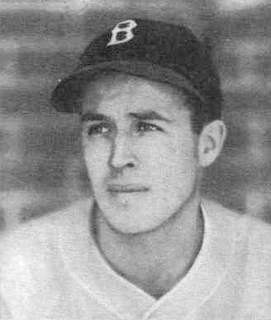
- Pitcher
- Born: November 12, 1914; Buffalo, New York, U.S.
- Died: April 27, 1981 (aged 66); New York City, U.S.
- Batted: Right Threw: Right

MLB debut
- June 27, 1936, for the Boston Red Sox

Last MLB appearance
- June 26, 1941, for the Boston Red Sox

MLB statistics
- Win–loss record: 22–15
- Earned run average: 5.33
- Strikeouts: 126
- Stats at Baseball Reference

Teams
- Boston Red Sox (1936, 1938–1941)

George Emerson Dickman (November 12, 1914 – April 27, 1981) was an American pitcher in Major League Baseball who played his entire career for the Boston Red Sox (1936, 1938–1941). Listed at 6 ft 2 in (1.88 m), 175 lb., Dickman batted and threw right-handed. He was born in Buffalo, New York.

A two-sport star at Washington and Lee University, Dickman was one of many major leaguers who saw his baseball career interrupted when he joined the Navy during World War II.

In a five-season career, Dickman posted a 22–15 record with 126 strikeouts and a 5.33 ERA and in 125 appearances, including 24 starts, six complete games, one shutout, eight saves and 349.2 innings pitched.

Following his playing retirement, Dickman became a highly respected coach at Princeton University for three years. His 1949–51 teams won two Eastern League championships and tied one, as the 1951 team reached the College World Series in Omaha, Nebraska, the only World Series the school has reached.

Dickman was regularly ribbed for his resemblance to film star Robert Taylor. Dickman died in New York City, New York, at the age of 66.

== Head coaching record ==
Record table
Season	Team	Overall	Conference	Standing	Postseason
Princeton Tigers (Eastern Intercollegiate Baseball League) (1949–1951)
1949	Princeton	12–7–1	6–3	1st	
1950	Princeton	14–8	7–2	T-1st	
1951	Princeton	20–6	7–2	1st	College World Series
Princeton:		46–21–1	20–7		
Total:		46–21–1			
National champion Postseason invitational champion Conference regular season champion Conference regular season and conference tournament champion Division regular season champion Division regular season and conference tournament champion Conference tournament champion
