= S. W. Anderson =

Technology moon light

Playing career
- 1919–1922: Chattanooga Lookouts
- 1920: Bartow Polkers
- 1924–1925: Memphis Chickasaws
- 1925–1926: Chattanooga Lookouts
- 1927: Wilkes-Barre Barons
- 1927: Mobile Bears
- 1928–1930: Williamsport Grays
- 1931: Norfolk Tars
- 1931: Charleston Senators
- Position: First baseman/Third baseman

Coaching career (HC unless noted)
- 1948–1952: Tennessee

Head coaching record
- Overall: 49–51–1

Accomplishments and honors

Awards
- SEC Coach of the Year (1951)

Cyrus S. W. Anderson is a former American college baseball coach. Anderson coached the Tennessee Volunteers baseball team from 1948 to 1952, leading the Volunteers to a runner-up finish in the 1951 College World Series.

== Playing career ==
Anderson enjoyed a 12-year career in professional baseball. He spent the 1924 season with the Memphis Chickasaws, who would win 104 games.

== Head coaching record ==
Record table
Season	Team	Overall	Conference	Standing	Postseason
Tennessee Volunteers (Southeastern Conference) (1948–1952)
1948	Tennessee	4–18–1	3–16–1	12th	
1949	Tennessee	6–12	5–9	10th	
1950	Tennessee	8–9	7–9	7th	
1951	Tennessee	20–3	16–1	1st	College World Series
1952	Tennessee	11–9	11–7	4th	
Tennessee:		49–51–1	42–42–1		
Total:		49–51–1			
National champion Postseason invitational champion Conference regular season champion Conference regular season and conference tournament champion Division regular season champion Division regular season and conference tournament champion Conference tournament champion
