= 1937 All-Big Six Conference football team =

The 1937 All-Big Six Conference football team consists of American football players chosen by various organizations for All-Big Six Conference teams for the 1937 college football season. The selectors for the 1937 season included the Associated Press (AP).

== All-Big Six selections ==
=== Backs ===
- Johnny Howell, Nebraska (AP-1)
- Howard Cleveland, Kansas State (AP-1)
- Jack Baer, Oklahoma (AP-1)
- Clarence Douglass, Kansas (AP-1)
- Everett Kischer, Iowa State (AP-2)
- Max Replogle, Kansas (AP-2)
- Henry Mahley, Missouri (AP-2)
- Elmer Hackney, Kansas State (AP-2)

=== Ends ===
- Pete Smith, Oklahoma (AP-1)
- Elmer Dohrmann, Nebraska (AP-1)
- Waddy Young, Oklahoma (AP-2)
- Paul Amen, Nebraska (AP-2)

=== Tackles ===
- Fred Shirey, Nebraska (AP-1)
- Anthony Krueger, Kansas State (AP-1)
- Ted Doyle, Nebraska (AP-2)
- Frank Heidel, Missouri (AP-2)

=== Guards ===
- Robert Mehring, Nebraska (AP-1)
- Ed Bock, Iowa State (AP-1)
- George Stapleton, Kansas (AP-2)
- Maurice Kirk, Missouri (AP-2)

=== Centers ===
- Charley Brock, Nebraska (AP-1)
- Mickey Parks, Oklahoma (AP-2)

== Key ==
AP = Associated Press

== See also ==
- 1937 College Football All-America Team
