= John Reddell =

American football player and coach (1930–2002)

Biographical details
- Born: February 17, 1930; Oklahoma City, Oklahoma, U.S.
- Died: October 14, 2002 (aged 72)

Playing career
- 1950–1952: Oklahoma
- Position: End

Coaching career (HC unless noted)
- 1953: DeKalb HS (TX)
- 1954: Classen HS HS (OK)
- 1955–1965: Amarillo Palo Duro HS (TX)
- 1966–1971: Arlington HS (TX)
- 1972–1975: Midland HS (TX)
- 1976–1992: Euless Trinity HS (TX)

Head coaching record
- Overall: 260–131–12

Accomplishments and honors

Championships
- National (1950)

John Reddell (February 17, 1930 – October 14, 2002) was an American football coach. He is among the winningest coaches in Texas high school football history. In 1996, he was inducted to the Hurst-Euless-Bedford Independent School District Hall of Fame.

Growing up on a little farm outside of Oklahoma City, Reddell attended Classen High School (now Classen School of Advanced Studies). His athletic abilities earned Reddell a scholarship to the University of Oklahoma. At 6 ft 1 in (1.85 m) and 175 pounds (79 kg), Reddell played end under head coach Bud Wilkinson from 1950 to 1952. Also playing baseball for the Sooners, Reddell was a catcher on the 1951 national championship team. He achieved the rare feat of winning two national championships in the same year, in 1951.

Soon after graduation, Reddell found his first head coaching position at DeKalb High School in Northeast Texas. He left in 1954 to return to his alma mater at Classen, an Oklahoma City suburb, in 1954. Despite a 9–2 in his first season, Reddell moved back to Texas, taking over as inaugural head football coach at newly opened Palo Duro High School in Amarillo. The school had offered him a $6,500 annual salary — almost $3,000 more than he had made at Classen. Palo Duro, however, only won a single game in 1955, ironically against a school from Oklahoma, Enid High School.

After 11 seasons at Palo Duro, Reddell moved on to coach at Arlington High School, where he amassed a 48–14–2 record in six seasons. In 1972, he then became head coach at Midland High School, where he faced powerhouses like Odessa Permian, San Angelo and Midland Lee, yet was able to compile a 25-11-4 record and leaving as the second-highest winning percentage in the history of the MHS program in 1975.

In 1976, Reddell became head coach at Trinity High School in Euless, a suburb of Dallas, Texas. He guided the Trojans to their first playoff victory in 1979, and in 1982 faced Hurst Bell in front of a Texas high school attendance record of 27,661 for district playoff game. While at Trinity, Reddell's teams won nine district titles and made the playoffs thirteen times. Reddell retired in 1992 with a record of 116–53–4 at Euless Trinity. He died in 2002 of congestive heart failure.
