= 1951 College World Series =

1951 NCAA I baseball tournament
- Season: 1951
- Teams: 8
- Finals site: Omaha Municipal Stadium; Omaha, NE
- Champions: Oklahoma (1st title)
- Runner-up: Tennessee (1st CWS Appearance)
- Winning coach: Jack Baer (1st title)
- MOP: Sidney Hatfield (Tennessee)
- Attendance: 27,789

The 1951 College World Series was the fifth NCAA-sanctioned baseball tournament that determined a national champion. The tournament was held as the conclusion of the 1951 NCAA baseball season and was played at Johnny Rosenblatt Stadium in Omaha, Nebraska from June 13 to June 17. The tournament's champion was the Oklahoma Sooners, coached by Jack Baer. The Most Outstanding Player was Sidney Hatfield of Tennessee. Oklahoma won national championships in football, wrestling, and baseball in the 1950–51 academic year.

The tournament consisted of no preliminary round of play as teams were selected directly into the College World Series. From 1954 to the present, teams compete in the NCAA Division I baseball tournament preliminary round(s), to determine the eight teams that will play in the College World Series.

== Participants ==
School	Conference	Record (conference)	Head coach	CWS appearances	CWS best finish	CWS record	Berth
Ohio State	Big 10	23–13 (10–2)	Marty Karow	0 (last: none)	none	0–0	District IV
Oklahoma	Big Seven	15–9 (10–1)	Jack Baer	0 (last: none)	none	0–0	Won District V Playoff
Princeton	EIBL	20–4 (7–2)	Emerson Dickman	0 (last: none)	none	0–0	District II
Springfield	Independent	15–5	Archie Allen	0 (last: none)	none	0–0	Won District I Playoff
Tennessee	SEC	16–1 (16–1)	S. W. Anderson	0 (last: none)	none	0–0	Won District III playoff
Texas A&M	SWC	20–9 (11–4)	Beau Bell	0 (last: none)	none	0–0	District VI
Southern California	CIBA	20–8 (11–5)	Rod Dedeaux	2 (last: 1949)	1st (1948)	3–3	District VIII
Utah	Skyline	15–1 (?–?)	Pete Carlston	0 (last: none)	none	0–0	District VII

== Results ==
=== Bracket ===
Upper round 1	Upper round 2	Upper final	Final
USC	4
Princeton	1
USC	8
Utah	2
Utah	7
Tennessee	1
USC	1
Oklahoma	4
Oklahoma	9^{10}
Ohio State	8
Oklahoma	7
Springfield	1
Springfield	5
Texas A&M	1	Oklahoma	3
Tennessee	2
Lower round 1	Lower round 2	Lower round 3	Lower final
Tennessee	2
Princeton	2	Springfield	0	Tennessee	9
Tennessee	3	Tennessee	5	USC	8
Utah	4
Texas A&M	8
Ohio State	2	Utah	15
Texas A&M	3

=== Game results ===
Date	Game	Winner	Score	Loser	Notes
June 13	Game 1	USC	4–1	Princeton	
June 13	Game 2	Utah	7–1	Tennessee	
June 13	Game 3	Oklahoma	9–8 (10)	Ohio State	
June 13	Game 4	Springfield	5–1	Texas A&M	
June 14	Game 5	Tennessee	3–2	Princeton	Princeton eliminated
June 14	Game 6	Texas A&M	3–2	Ohio State	Ohio State eliminated
June 14	Game 7	USC	8–2	Utah	
June 14	Game 8	Oklahoma	7–1	Springfield	
June 15	Game 9	Tennessee	2–0	Springfield	Springfield eliminated
June 15	Game 10	Utah	15–8	Texas A&M	Texas A&M eliminated
June 15	Game 11	Oklahoma	4–1	USC	
June 16	Game 12	Tennessee	5–4	Utah	Utah eliminated
June 16	Game 13	Tennessee	9–8	USC	USC eliminated
June 17	Final	Oklahoma	3–2	Tennessee	Oklahoma wins CWS

== Notable players ==
- Ohio State: Moe Savransky, Duke Simpson, Fred Taylor
- Princeton: Dave Sisler
- USC: Bob Lillis
- Tennessee: Sidney Hatfield
