= 1951 USC Trojans baseball team =

American college baseball season

1951 USC Trojans baseball

CIBA Champions PCC Tournament Champions District VIII Champions

College World Series, T-3rd
- Conference: California Intercollegiate Baseball Association
- Record: 22–10 (11–5 CIBA)
- Head coach: Rod Dedeaux (10th season)
- Home stadium: Bovard Field

1951 Pacific Coast Conference baseball standings
	Conf.						Overall
Team	W		L		T	PCT	W		L		T	PCT
North Division
Oregon State ‍†‍‍	10	–	4	–	0	.714	23	–	6	–	0	.793
Washington State ‍‍‍	11	–	5	–	0	.688	30	–	11	–	0	.732
Washington ‍‍‍	10	–	6	–	0	.625	14	–	7	–	1	.659
Oregon ‍‍‍	7	–	9	–	0	.438	14	–	14	–	0	.500
Idaho ‍‍‍	0	–	14	–	0	.000	3	–	17	–	0	.150
California Intercollegiate Baseball Association
USC ‍†‍‍^{y}	11	–	5	–	0	.688	22	–	10	–	0	.688
UCLA ‍‍‍	10	–	6	–	0	.625	24	–	13	–	0	.649
Stanford ‍‍‍	9	–	9	–	0	.500	21	–	13	–	0	.618
California ‍‍‍	6	–	10	–	0	.375	22	–	16	–	0	.579
Santa Clara ‍‍‍	5	–	11	–	0	.313	0	–	0	–	0	–
† – Conference champion y – Invited to the NCAA Tournament

The 1951 USC Trojans baseball team represented the University of Southern California in the 1951 NCAA baseball season. The Trojans played their home games at Bovard Field. The team was coached by Rod Dedeaux in his 10th year at USC.

The Trojans won the California Intercollegiate Baseball Association championship, the Pacific Coast Conference Tournament and advanced to the College World Series, where they were defeated by the Tennessee Volunteers.

== Roster ==
1951 USC Trojans baseball team
Players
Coaches

#	Pos.	Name	B/T	Height	Weight	Year	Home town
	P	Charles Ane	/	—	—
	C	Lou Bishara	/	—	—	So
		Warner Boone	/	—	—	So
		John Burkhead	/	—	—
	P	David Cesca	/	—	—	Jr
	OF	Hal Charnofsky	/	—	—	Jr
	INF	Stan Charnofsky	/	—	—	Jr
		Donald Herman	/	—	—
	OF	Robert Hertel	/	—	—	Jr
	INF	Al Karan	/	—	—	Sr
		George Keeling	/	—	—
	P	Thomas Kemp	/	—	—
	INF	Gary Killingsworth	R/R	6 ft 1 in (1.85 m)	175 lb (79 kg)	Jr	Long Beach, California
		Allan Lamont	/	—	—	Jr
	INF	Bob Lillis	R/R	5 ft 11 in (1.8 m)	160 lb (73 kg)	Sr	Pasadena, California
	P	Tom Lovrich	/	—	—	Jr
		Dave Rankin	/L	—	—
	OF	Tom Riach	/	—	—	Sr
		Don Rose	/	—	—
	OF	Jay Roundy	/	—	—
	INF	Edwin Simpson	R/R	6 ft 3 in (1.91 m)	200 lb (91 kg)	So	San Diego, California
	C	Will Wills	/	—	—

Head coach

Rod Dedeaux

Assistant coach(es)

Legend

- (C) Team captain
- (S) Suspended
- (I) Ineligible
- Injured
- Current redshirt

== Schedule ==
1951 USC Trojans baseball game log
Regular season
March (4–1)

#	Date	Opponent	Site/stadium	Score	Overall record	CIBA record
1	March 9	Santa Barbara	Bovard Field • Los Angeles, California	12–2	1–0	0–0
2	March 20	Loyola Marymount	Bovard Field • Los Angeles, California	11–9	2–0	0–0
3	March 24	at San Diego State	Unknown • San Diego, California	10–12	2–1	0–0
4	March 30	Stanford	Bovard Field • Los Angeles, California	9–6	3–1	1–0
5	March 31	Stanford	Bovard Field • Los Angeles, California	10–9	4–1	2–0

April (7–2)

#	Date	Opponent	Site/stadium	Score	Overall record	CIBA record
6	April 10	Pepperdine	Bovard Field • Los Angeles, California	12–7	5–1	2–0
7	April 13	Santa Clara	Bovard Field • Los Angeles, California	6–1	6–1	3–0
8	April 14	Santa Clara	Bovard Field • Los Angeles, California	10–0	7–1	4–0
9	April 20	at Stanford	Sunken Diamond • Stanford, California	1–6	7–2	4–1
10	April 21	at California	Edwards Field • Berkeley, California	7–4	8–2	5–1
11	April 21	California	Edwards Field • Berkeley, California	5–3	9–2	6–1
12	April 24	Loyola Marymount	Bovard Field • Los Angeles, California	10–5	10–2	6–1
13	April 27	California	Bovard Field • Los Angeles, California	6–7	10–3	6–2
14	April 28	California	Bovard Field • Los Angeles, California	7–6	11–3	7–2

May (7–4)

#	Date	Opponent	Site/stadium	Score	Overall record	CIBA record
15	May 1	San Diego State	Bovard Field • Los Angeles, California	3–2	12–3	7–2
16	May 5	at Santa Clara	Unknown • Santa Clara, California	5–2	13–3	8–2
17	May 6	at Santa Clara	Unknown • Santa Clara, California	3–4	13–4	8–3
18	May 7	at Stanford	Sunken Diamond • Stanford, California	10–2	14–4	9–3
19	May 8	San Francisco	Bovard Field • Los Angeles, California	12–7	15–4	9–3
20	May 11	at Arizona	UA Field • Tucson, Arizona	7–2	16–4	9–3
21	May 12	at Arizona	UA Field • Tucson, Arizona	2–9	16–5	9–3
22	May 18	UCLA	Bovard Field • Los Angeles, California	2–1	17–5	10–3
23	May 19	at UCLA	Joe E. Brown Field • Los Angeles, California	2–4	17–6	10–4
24	May 19	at UCLA	Joe E. Brown Field • Los Angeles, California	8–3	18–6	11–4
25	May 22	UCLA	Bovard Field • Los Angeles, California	2–3	18–7	11–5

Postseason
Pacific Coast Conference Tournament (2–1)

#	Date	Opponent	Site/stadium	Score	Overall record	CIBA record
26	June 1	Oregon State	Bovard Field • Los Angeles, California	6–4	19–7	11–5
27	June 2	Oregon State	Bovard Field • Los Angeles, California	1–12	19–8	11–5
28	June 2	Oregon State	Bovard Field • Los Angeles, California	10–7	20–8	11–5

College World Series (2–2)

#	Date	Opponent	Site/stadium	Score	Overall record	CIBA record
29	June 13	vs Princeton	Omaha Municipal Stadium • Omaha, Nebraska	4–1	21–8	11–5
30	June 14	vs Utah	Omaha Municipal Stadium • Omaha, Nebraska	8–2	22–8	11–5
31	June 15	vs Oklahoma	Omaha Municipal Stadium • Omaha, Nebraska	1–4	22–9	11–5
32	June 16	vs Tennessee	Omaha Municipal Stadium • Omaha, Nebraska	8–9	22–10	11–5

== Awards and honors ==
Hal Charnofsky

- First Team All-CIBA

Stan Charnofsky

- First Team All-CIBA

Al Karan

- First Team All-CIBA

Tom Lovrich

- First Team All-CIBA

Jay Roundy

- First Team All-American American Baseball Coaches Association
