= 1951 Utah Redskins baseball team =

American college baseball season

1951 Utah Redskins baseball

District VII Playoff champions

College World Series, T-3rd
- Conference: Skyline Conference
- Western
- Record: 17–3 ( Skyline)
- Head coach: Pete Carlston (2nd season)
- Captain: Billy Green
- Home stadium: Derks Field

The 1951 Utah Redskins baseball team represented the University of Utah in the 1951 NCAA baseball season. The Redskins played their home games at Derks Field. The team was coached by Pete Carlston in his 2nd year at Utah.

The Redskins won the District VII playoff to advance to the College World Series, where they were defeated by the Tennessee Volunteers.

== Roster ==
1951 Utah Redskins baseball team
Players
Coaches

#	Pos.	Name	B/T	Height	Weight	Year	Home town
		Ray Andrus	/	—	—
	INF	Jim Cleverly	/	—	—
	C	Micky Culleton	/	—	—
	INF	Dave Cunningham	/	—	—
		Tom Dublinski	/	—	—
		Glenn Duggins	/	—	—
	P	Doug Eurlong	/	—	—
		Bruce Goodrich	/	—	—
		Billy Green (C)	/	—	—
		Rus Orton	/	—	—
	P	Max Pessetto	/	—	—
		Don Price	/	—	—
		Wayne Ray	/	—	—
		Delmar Schick	/	—	—
		Wayne Skeen	/	—	—
	P	Victor Stuckenschneider	/	—	—
	OF	Basil Williams	/	—	—

Head coach

Pete Carlston

Assistant coach(es)

Legend

- (C) Team captain
- (S) Suspended
- (I) Ineligible
- Injured
- Current redshirt

== Schedule ==
1951 Utah Redskins baseball game log
Regular season
April (0–0)

#	Date	Opponent	Site/stadium	Score	Overall record	Skyline record
	April 23	BYU	Derks Field • Salt Lake City, Utah	14–2	0–0	–

May (0–0)

#	Date	Opponent	Site/stadium	Score	Overall record	Skyline record
	May 10	BYU	Derks Field • Salt Lake City, Utah	12–3	0–0	–
	May 11	at BYU	Timpanogos Park • Provo, Utah	12–3	0–0	–

District VII Playoff (2–0)

#	Date	Opponent	Site/stadium	Score	Overall record	Skyline record
15		at Colorado State	Unknown • Greeley, Colorado	20–1	14–1	–
16		at Colorado State	Unknown • Greeley, Colorado	11–6	15–1	–

College World Series (2–2)

#	Date	Opponent	Site/stadium	Score	Overall record	Skyline record
17	June 13	vs Tennessee	Omaha Municipal Stadium • Omaha, Nebraska	7–1	16–1	–
18	June 14	vs Southern California	Omaha Municipal Stadium • Omaha, Nebraska	2–8	16–2	–
19	June 15	vs Texas A&M	Omaha Municipal Stadium • Omaha, Nebraska	15–8	17–2	–
20	June 16	vs Tennessee	Omaha Municipal Stadium • Omaha, Nebraska	4–5	17–3	–

== Awards and honors ==
Jim Cleverly

- American Baseball Coaches Association First Team All-American
