= Pat Hubert =

American baseball player

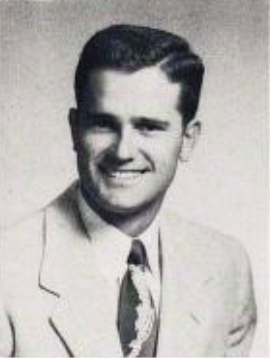
- Hubert, c. 1951
- Pitcher
- Born: December 11, 1926; Riviera, Texas, US (Note: Riviera was listed as Hubert's place of birth on his draft registration card of December 1944, which he signed.)
- Died: December 2, 2006 (aged 79); Kleberg County, Texas, US (Note: Hubert's grave marker lists Vattmann under both his date of birth and date of death; located in Kleberg County, Vattmann is neither incorporated nor a census-designated place.)
- Batted: Right Threw: Right

Patrick Laverne Hubert (December 11, 1926 – December 2, 2006) was an American baseball pitcher, best known for his time playing college baseball for Texas A&M University. He later played two seasons in minor league baseball. Listed at 5 feet 10 inches (1.78 m) and 165 pounds (75 kg), he threw and batted right-handed.

== Baseball career ==
Hubert pitched for the Texas A&M Aggies baseball team for three seasons, 1949 through his senior year of 1951. He was named to the 1951 College Baseball All-America Team, was an All-Southwest Conference (SWC) pitcher in 1950 and 1951, was voted the Most Valuable Pitcher in 1951, was a member of the SWC co-championship team in 1951, and pitched in the 1951 College World Series for the Aggies. Hubert was inducted into the Texas A&M University Athletic Hall of Fame in 1980.

Shortly after he finished playing at Texas A&M, Hubert played semi-professional baseball for the Plymouth Oilers, located in Sinton, Texas. He then served in the United States Air Force for three years, where he became a first lieutenant. In 1955, he played for the minor league Harlingen Capitals of the Big State League. In 36 games (20 starts) he compiled a 5–16 win–loss record with 5.17 earned run average; he struck out 86 batters in 181 innings pitched. In 1956, he made seven relief appearances for the Lubbock Hubbers, also of the Big State League; he was released from the team in June.

Hubert later coached baseball to hundreds of children in the Kleberg County area for over 40 years, with his involvement in Little League Baseball. In the 1970s, he was named "Mr. Baseball, Kingsville, Texas." In 1989, he and his wife Goldia were named "Aggie Parents of the Year." One year before his death, in 2005, the high school baseball field in Riviera, Texas, was dedicated in his honor.

== Personal life ==
After graduation from veterinary school in 1952, Hubert served in the United States Air Force. For his service, he was awarded Knight of the Equestrian Order of the Holy Sepulchre. He was also president of his local Rotary Club for a time. Hubert taught at the Texas A&M Veterinarian School from 1954 through 1958. After teaching, Hubert ranched, farmed, and pursued his own veterinary practice in Kingsville, Texas. In 1994, the Kleberg and Kenedy County Junior Livestock Show was dedicated to Hubert. In 2000, he was named an Outstanding Conservation Rancher. Hubert also served as a board member of the Kleberg First National Bank for 20 years. Upon his death, the Texas Senate passed a Resolution in his honor.
