= 1951 Springfield Maroons baseball team =

American college baseball season

1951 Springfield Maroons baseball

District I Playoff champion

College World Series, T–5th
- Conference: Independent
- Record: 16–7
- Head coach: Archie Allen (4th season)
- Captain: Matt Maetoza

The 1951 Springfield Maroons baseball team represented Springfield College in the 1951 NCAA baseball season. The team was coached by Archie Allen in his 4th year at Springfield.

The Maroons won the District I playoff to advance to the College World Series, where they were defeated by the Tennessee Volunteers.

During the Maroon's June 14 game against the Oklahoma Sooners, they drew a CWS record 15 walks off one just a single pitcher, James Waldrip. Springfield also set a 9-inning CWS record with 17 stranded baserunners.

== Roster ==
1951 Springfield Maroons baseball team
Players
Coaches

#	Pos.	Name	B/T	Height	Weight	Year	Home town
		Ed Allen	/	—	—
		A Anscomb	/	—	—
		William Brown	/	—	—
	INF	Bob D'Agostino	/	—	—	Sr
		Bob Douglas	/	—	—	Sr
	INF	George Flood	/	—	—	So
		Ed Hoffman	/	—	—
		Tony Hopkins	/	—	—
		Joe Jennings	/	—	—
	OF	Sherman Kinney	/	—	—	So
	INF	Matt Maetoza (C)	/	—	—	Sr
		Theodore Muhaw	/	—	—
	P	Frank Nevers	/	—	—	Sr
	P	Bill Nordberg	/	—	—	Sr
	OF	Bill Peatfield	/	—	—
		Jim Pelcher	/	—	—	Jr
22	INF	Ed Redmond	/	—	—	Jr
		Tommy Ruggerio	/	—	—	Jr
		George Sherman	/	—	—
		Robert Sewell	/	—	—	Sr
	OF	Tom Simos	/	—	—
	C	Walt Smith	/	—	—	So
	P	Hank Tominaga	/	—	—	So

Head coach

Archie Allen

Assistant coach(es)

Legend

- (C) Team captain
- (S) Suspended
- (I) Ineligible
- Injured
- Current redshirt

== Schedule ==
1951 Springfield Maroons baseball game log
Regular season
April (0–0)

#	Date	Opponent	Site/stadium	Score	Overall record
5	April	AIC	Unknown • Springfield, Massachusetts	3–0	3–2
	April 21	at Holy Cross	Unknown • Worcester, Massachusetts	2–4	–
	April 28	at Harvard	Unknown • Cambridge, Massachusetts	3–9	–

May (0–0)

#	Date	Opponent	Site/stadium	Score	Overall record
16	May 30	UMass	Unknown • Springfield, Massachusetts	2–1	12–4

June (1–0)

#	Date	Opponent	Site/stadium	Score	Overall record
17	June 2	at UMass	Unknown • Amherst, Massachusetts	3–0	13–4

Postseason
District I Tournament (2–1)

#	Date	Opponent	Site/stadium	Score	Overall record
18	June 4	vs Brown	Unknown • Lowell, Massachusetts	0–2	13–5
19	June 5	vs Brown	Unknown • Lowell, Massachusetts	3–2	14–5
20	June 6	vs Brown	Unknown • Lowell, Massachusetts	2–0	15–5

College World Series (1–2)

#	Date	Opponent	Site/stadium	Score	Overall record
21	June 13	vs Texas A&M	Omaha Municipal Stadium • Omaha, Nebraska	15–8	16–5
22	June 14	vs Oklahoma	Omaha Municipal Stadium • Omaha, Nebraska	1–7	16–6
23	June 15	vs Tennessee	Omaha Municipal Stadium • Omaha, Nebraska	0–2	16–7
