= Tim Lahey =

American baseball player (born 1982)

- Pitcher
- Born: February 7, 1982 (age 43); Worcester, Massachusetts, U.S.
- Bats: Right Throws: Right
- Stats at Baseball Reference

Timothy William Lahey (/ˈleɪhiː/; born February 7, 1982) is an American former professional baseball relief pitcher. He is officially listed as standing 6 feet 5 inches (196 cm) tall and weighing 250 pounds (110 kg). Lahey is an example of a "phantom ballplayer": one who has spent time on a major league roster but never appeared in any games.

== High school and college ==
Lahey was born February 7, 1982, in Worcester, Massachusetts. Growing up in Massachusetts, his favorite Major League Baseball team was the Boston Red Sox. He made the varsity team in his first season at St. John's High School, located in Shrewsbury, Massachusetts—the first freshman since Ron Darling to be named a member of the varsity squad. In addition to baseball, he played golf and basketball in high school.

After graduating, Lahey attended Princeton University, where he was a four-year member of the Tigers baseball team. In his first two seasons, Lahey saw limited playing time as a catcher and hit a total of five home runs over those two years. As a junior, however, he hit 11 home runs, the Tigers' second-best single-season total, and was named to the all-regional team in that year's NCAA Division I Baseball Championship. In 2003, he played collegiate summer baseball with the Chatham A's of the Cape Cod Baseball League. In his final season, he was named to the all-Ivy League second team, batting in 31 runs that year and "[solidifying] his status as one of the greatest catchers in recent Princeton history". After graduating with a degree in politics, Lahey was selected by the Minnesota Twins in the 20th round of the 2004 Major League Baseball draft, the 601st overall pick.

== Professional career ==
=== 2004–05 ===
After signing with the Twins, Lahey was assigned to the rookie-level Elizabethton Twins for the 2004 season, when they finished in second place in the Appalachian League's West Division. He played 26 games for Elizabethton, leading the team's four catchers in assists and errors during his 22 games in the field. For the season, he compiled a .202 batting average (17 hits in 84 at bats), hitting 3 home runs and batting in 11 runs. At the beginning of the 2005 season, the Twins kept Lahey in extended spring training; after a discussion with Joe Vavra and Jim Rantz, Lahey notified the team that he was willing to convert to pitching. He spent the entire 2005 season in Elizabethton refining his pitching skills, leading the team in saves (15) and games played (26) and allowing no home runs. On the year, he did not win any games, but lost his first decision and amassed a 3.55 earned run average (ERA).

=== 2006–07 ===
Lahey was promoted to the high-A Fort Myers Miracle for the 2006 season. He earned his first victory that year, one of seven on the season. He finished with a 7–1 win–loss record, with his .875 winning percentage the highest mark of his career. In the field, Lahey led the team's pitchers in assists, with 17, and made no errors. On the mound, he collected a 4.33 ERA; he was second on the team in games played (45) and notched the club's third-highest save total, with nine. The following year found Lahey promoted again, beginning the 2007 season with the double-A New Britain Rock Cats. Making a team-high 50 relief appearances, he led the Rock Cats with 13 saves and collected an 8–4 record and a 3.45 ERA. On August 29, he was promoted to the triple-A Rochester Red Wings, where he finished the season, pitching in two games and saving one.

=== 2008 ===
After the 2007 season, Lahey was selected by the Tampa Bay Rays with the first overall pick in the major league phase of the Rule 5 draft on December 6; thereafter, he was immediately traded to the Chicago Cubs for cash considerations. He was waived by the Cubs in March, in favor of Jon Lieber, and subsequently claimed by the Philadelphia Phillies. Lahey opened the 2008 season in the Phillies bullpen. but was designated for assignment April 5 after not appearing in a game due to the activation of closer Brad Lidge from the disabled list. As a Rule 5 draft pick, Lahey was offered back to the Twins, returned to them on April 11, 2008, and was assigned to Fort Myers. He appeared in two games for the Miracle, pitching three scoreless innings, but was quickly called up to Rochester, where he faced the farm team of the club he had just left. He defeated the Lehigh Valley IronPigs, the Phillies' triple-A affiliate, on April 23 by pitching 1 1/3 scoreless innings and striking out two. For the 2008 season, Lahey won five games and lost five, striking out 53 and serving as the setup man to Bobby Korecky, earning eight saves. On the field, he compiled yet another errorless season.

=== 2009–10 ===
Lahey began 2009 with Rochester, but his 56 2/3 innings pitched on the season were his lowest total since 2005, the season of his conversion to the pitcher's mound. He earned a single save, striking out 44 batters, and compiled a career-high 5.72 ERA. His 41 appearances were second-most among Red Wings pitchers, and he committed no errors on the season while notching 12 assists. The following season, Lahey improved his win–loss record to 5–3, lowered his ERA to 5.08, pitched the second-most innings of his career (79 2/3), and struck out 13 more batters than the previous year in only four more contests, but was released by the Twins at the end of 2010.

== Pitching style ==
Lahey commands three pitches; his standard is a two-seam sinking fastball. He throws two breaking pitches: a slider, his "out pitch" to right-handed batters, and a split-finger fastball, more effective against left-handers. He credits baseball statistics and "numbers" for helping him improve the way he pitches; in a 2010 interview, Lahey claimed that his view of the game since the advent of Moneyball and advanced statistics has not changed, although he said that it has changed the way the public views the game.
