= Oklahoma Sooners baseball =

Baseball team of the University of Oklahoma

Oklahoma Sooners
- 2027 Oklahoma Sooners baseball team
- Founded: 1898 (128 years ago)
- University: University of Oklahoma
- Athletic director: Roger Denny
- Head coach: Skip Johnson (9th season)
- Conference: SEC
- Location: Norman, Oklahoma
- Home stadium: Kimrey Family Stadium (capacity: 3,180)
- Nickname: Sooners
- Colors: Crimson and cream

College World Series champions
- 1951, 1994, 2026

College World Series runner-up
- 2022

College World Series appearances
- 1951, 1972, 1973, 1974, 1975, 1976, 1992, 1994, 1995, 2010, 2022, 2026

NCAA regional champions
- 1975, 1976, 1992, 1994, 1995, 2006, 2010, 2012, 2013, 2022, 2026

NCAA tournament appearances
- 1947, 1951, 1955, 1956, 1972, 1973, 1974, 1975, 1976, 1977, 1979, 1982, 1984, 1985, 1986, 1987, 1988, 1989, 1991, 1992, 1994, 1995, 1997, 1998, 2000, 2002, 2004, 2005, 2006, 2008, 2009, 2010, 2011, 2012, 2013, 2017, 2018, 2022, 2023, 2024, 2025, 2026

Conference tournament champions
- Big Eight: 1977; Big 12: 1997, 2013, 2022

Conference regular season champions
- Big Eight: 1931, 1933, 1935, 1936, 1939, 1940, 1946, 1947, 1951, 1953, 1955, 1956, 1972, 1973, 1974, 1975, 1977, 1978, 1986, 1992, 1995; Big 12: 2024

The Oklahoma Sooners baseball team represents the University of Oklahoma (OU) in NCAA Division I college baseball. Oklahoma is a member of the Southeastern Conference. The Sooners are coached by Skip Johnson and play their home games at Kimrey Family Stadium. They have competed in the College World Series 12 times, winning the national championship in 1951, 1994, and 2026.

== History ==
=== The early years ===
From the very beginning, Oklahoma's baseball program exhibited coaching stability and consistency. Bennie Owen is credited as the first head coach of the Oklahoma Sooners baseball program, coaching from 1906 to 1922. Owen compiled an overall record of 142–102–4 during his 17 seasons coaching the Sooners. In 1923, Bill Owen took over as head coach. He coached through the 1926 season and went 42-13 during his tenure - a .764 winning percentage. In 1927, OU named Lawrence Haskell the third head coach in the program's history. Haskell led the Sooners for 15 seasons, amassing an overall record of 176–74–2 and winning six conference championships.

=== Jack Baer era (1942–1967) ===
Jack Baer became the fourth head coach of the Oklahoma Sooners baseball program in 1942. In his 10th year as coach, Baer led the program to new heights, claiming the 1951 national championship in baseball for the first time in school history. The Sooners nearly missed out on that title opportunity. An ESPN story published as a backdrop for the Sooners' 2022 Men's College World Series (MCWS) finals appearance noted that legendary OU football coach Bud Wilkinson, also the school's athletic director, "didn't care much for baseball, telling the team they couldn't go to Omaha, even after qualifying." OU president George Lynn Cross intervened, but only provided a bus to transport the team to Omaha, providing insufficient money for hotels. The team left on the 500-mile (800 km) drive to Norman immediately after the title game, and no team members received championship rings until the 50th anniversary of the championship in 2001, by which time several members had died.

Baer went on to coach the Sooners until 1967. During his 26-year tenure as coach, Baer amassed 281 victories, a .529 winning percentage, and still remains OU's longest tenured baseball coach.

=== Enos Semore era (1968–1989) ===
Enos Semore replaced Jack Baer in 1968. Semore became the 5th head coach in the program's history, and led the program through some of its most successful years. During his 22-year tenure as coach, Semore's teams averaged 38.5 victories a year, claiming 9 conference championships and 2 conference tournament titles. Under his direction, the Sooners claimed 4 straight Big Eight titles while also making 5 consecutive trips to the MCWS from 1972–1976. His 1976 squad set a school record that still stands today with 62 victories. The 851 victories he compiled while head coach of the Sooners still ranks first in the program's history. Semore compiled a record of 851–370–1 while at OU. Semore's career winning percentage of .697 ranks in the top 50 all-time in NCAA Division I history.

=== Larry Cochell era (1991–2005) ===
Semore resigned just days before the start of the 1990 season for medical reasons. Assistant Stan Meek was named interim coach for the 1990 season, during which the Sooners finished 31–26 overall and failed to make the NCAA Division I baseball tournament for the first time since 1983.

To replace Meek, the Sooners traveled out west and hired Larry Cochell away from Cal State Fullerton. Cochell replaced legendary coach Augie Garrido at Fullerton when Garrido left for Illinois. During his three seasons at Fullerton, Cochell's teams went 109–68. Although Fullerton had long been considered a baseball powerhouse, OU offered Cochell a financial package that he could not turn down, and he became the seventh head coach in school history.

Cochell wasted no time bringing the team back into the national spotlight. In his first year, Cochell led the team to an overall record of 40–23 and a second-place finish in the Big Eight. The Sooners returned to the NCAA tournament, but were quickly eliminated in regional play, losing their second game to eventual national champion LSU. The following year, the Sooners tied for the Big Eight conference championship, and once again were awarded with a spot in the postseason. The Sooners fared much better winning the NCAA Mideast Regional to earn their first trip to the MCWS since 1976. The Sooners tied for 5th in the 1992 College World Series winning 1 game and losing 2, but Cochell would use the 1992 season to catapult the Sooners to national prominence. The 1992 team finished the season 43–24 overall. After a rebuilding year in 1993, Cochell was poised to return the program to glory.

==== 1994 national championship ====
In 1994, Cochell entered his fourth season at the helm of the Sooner program. The Sooners breezed through the 1994 regular season with a record of 42–17. They also posted a 21–9 mark in conference play, but that was only good enough to finish second in the conference. The Sooners were placed in the NCAA Central Regional along with Arkansas St., Stanford, and Texas. In their first game of the regional, OU defeated Arkansas St. 10–3, setting up a second round game with Stanford. Once again OU had no trouble putting runs on the board, defeating Stanford 10–4. After winning their first two games, OU was in the driver's seat for the remainder of the regional. With a berth in the regional championship on the line, the Sooners delivered; they defeated Texas 15–4. Texas avoided elimination to set up a rematch with OU in the championship, but the result turned out the same. The Sooners claimed the Central Regional championship, defeating the Longhorns 6–3. The Sooners were on their way to Omaha, earning their 8th trip to the College World Series.

The Sooners were the No. 4 seed in the 1994 College World Series, which set up a first-round game with the No. 5 seed Auburn Tigers. OU continued their winning ways, defeating the Tigers 5–4. The win placed the Sooners in the winner's bracket and set up a second-round game against Arizona St. Arizona St. surprised top-seeded Miami in the opening round 4–0 to advance to the winner's bracket. OU once again won by a single run, 4–3, to advance to the semi-finals. After defeating Miami for a second game and eliminating the Hurricanes, the Sun Devils were looking for revenge, but the Sooners rose to the occasion. Oklahoma eliminated Arizona St., 6–1, to advance to the championship round. The Sooners played Georgia Tech for the championship, who had also won its first three games in Omaha that year. OU's bats came alive in the championship game as OU defeated the Yellow Jackets 13–5 to claim the second national title in school history. Cochell guided the Sooners to a 50–17 overall record after winning the CWS.

==== Retirement and legacy ====
On May 1, 2005, Cochell submitted his letter of resignation to Oklahoma. Cochell resigned after making racial remarks during two separate interviews. Cochell used racially insensitive remarks to describe Joe Dunigan III who was a freshman outfielder and is an African-American. The remarks were not during taped interviews, but were brought to the attention of the university by ESPN after the fact. Cochell would later issue a public statement in which he apologized for the remarks, and the Dunnigan family would later state they forgave Cochell.

Cochell, who had coached for 39 total seasons, was the keeper of the OU baseball program for nearly 15 full seasons. He led the program through one of the most successful eras of its history, including leading them to the 1994 championship, the first in over four decades, despite the quick exit that engulfed his departure, although he was invited back to the introduction of Pete Hughes as head coach in 2013.

=== Sunny Golloway era (2006–2013) ===
Sonny Golloway was promoted from associate head coach to interim head coach on May 1, 2005 following the resignation of Larry Cochell. Golloway held the interim tag for the remainder of the 2005 season posting a 12–6 record. The Sooners earned a berth in the 2005 NCAA tournament, but were eliminated in the Oxford regional finals by Ole Miss. Following the 2005 season, the interim tag was removed from the title, and Golloway became head coach of the Oklahoma Sooners baseball program.

Prior to becoming head coach at OU, Golloway returned to Norman for his second stint with the Sooners Program. Golloway was an assistant coach under Cochell from 1992–1995 before leaving to become the head coach at Oral Roberts. Golloway would coach a total of 8 seasons at Oral Roberts posting a 335–156 record. Following the 2003 season, Golloway left Oral Roberts to return to Norman as associate head coach.

In his first full season as head coach of the Sooners, Golloway led the team to a 45–22 record overall. The 2006 team finished 3rd overall in the Big 12 Conference, and earned its second straight NCAA post-season berth. In the post-season, Oklahoma was awarded a host site for the regional round of the tournament. After losing their first game to TCU, the Sooners would win 4 straight to earn their first regional title since 1995 and a berth in the super regional round for the first time. Oklahoma traveled to Houston to face the Rice Owls, with the winner earning a berth in the 2006 College World Series. Rice won the first game, but OU was able to come back with a victory in game 2 to force a rubber game. Rice, the No. 2 overall seed that year, was just too much in the pivotal third game of the super regionals, and ended OU's season.

After a promising first full season as coach, expectations for Golloway were increasing. Unfortunately in 2007, the Sooners never lived up to their potential finishing the season 34–24. They failed to make the post-season, but Golloway was determined to keep the program moving in the right direction. The following year, the Sooners finished the season 36–26–1 overall, and once again earned a trip to the post-season. The Sooners would make it all the way to the Tempe regional finals, before coming up short against Arizona St. to end the 2008 season.

In his fourth full year as head coach at Oklahoma, Golloway was once again able to keep the program moving in the right direction. OU finished second in the Big 12 posting a 17–10 record in conference play, only a half game behind Texas for the regular season title. After earning the No. 2 seed in the 2009 Big 12 baseball tournament, the Sooners posted a disappointing 1–2 record in pool play. Following the Big 12 championship, the Sooners had a record of 41–18. Despite their poor performance in the Big 12 tournament, they were still rewarded with a host site and the No. 7 national seed in the 2009 NCAA Division I baseball tournament. After winning their first game in the Norman regional, the Sooners fell to Arkansas in the second round. The Sooners would bounce back and defeat Washington St. in an elimination, but once again lost to Arkansas. The Sooners finished the 2009 season 43–20.

In 2010, the Sooners finished 50–18. The team swept through their regional and won the super regional against the Virginia Cavaliers 2–1. The Super Regional was highlighted by Cody Reine who had back to back multi-homerun games in games 2 and 3. The Sooners earned their 10th appearance in the College World Series where they won their first game against the South Carolina Gamecocks 4–3. The Sooners then lost to the Clemson Tigers and then lost on a walk-off hit to the Gamecocks in a rematch.

After the 2013 season, Golloway left for Auburn.

=== Pete Hughes era (2014–2017) ===
In 2014, Pete Hughes, who had previously served as head coach of the Virginia Tech Hokies for the previous seven seasons. In his four seasons with the Sooners, he led them to over 30 wins three times, although his team advanced past the Second Round of the Big 12 Tournament just once (2015), with only one NCAA tournament appearance in 2017, which ended with two losses in the Louisville Regional. After the 2017 season, he was fired by the program.

=== Skip Johnson era (2018–present) ===
On June 19, 2017, Skip Johnson was announced as the new head coach of the Sooners. In the 2022 season, Johnson coached the Sooners to the Big 12 Tournament championship defeating Texas, and to the College World Series defeating Virginia Tech in the Blacksburg Super Regional. The Sooners reached the final of the College World Series, in which they lost against the Ole Miss Rebels. During the 2026 season, Oklahoma finished 11th in the SEC and was selected to play in the Atlanta Regional hosted by the Georgia Tech. Oklahoma defeated Georgia Tech and advanced to the Lawrence Super Regional against former Big 12 foe Kansas. The Sooners went on to sweep the Jayhawks and advance to the 2026 College World Series in Omaha. In the 2026 College World Series, the Sooners beat Alabama and Georgia to advance to the finals against the North Carolina Tar Heels. Oklahoma won the finals against the Tar Heels in 3 games to capture the 2026 College World Series title, the first for Oklahoma since 1994.

== Kimrey Family Stadium ==
Kimrey Family Stadium is a baseball stadium in Norman, Oklahoma. It is the home field for the University of Oklahoma Sooners college baseball team. It is named after the former OU player Dale Mitchell who holds OU's career and single-season batting records. The park was originally constructed at a cost of $1.27 million and was dedicated in 1982.

== Conference affiliations ==
The Missouri Valley Intercollegiate Athletic Association was not officially renamed until 1964. In 1964, it officially became the Big Eight Conference, but it was nicknamed the "Big Six" and "Big Seven" prior to its official renaming.

- Southwest Conference (1914–1918)
- Missouri Valley Intercollegiate Athletic Association/Big Six/Big Seven/Big Eight (1919–1996)
- Big 12 (1997–2024)
- Southeastern Conference (2025–present)

== Head coaches ==
- Records are current through the 2026 season

Tenure	Coach	Years	Record	Pct.
1906–1922	Bennie Owen	17	142–102–4	.581
1923–1926	Bill Owen	4	42–13	.764
1927–1941	Lawrence Haskell	15	176–74–2	.702
1942–1967	Jack Baer	26	281–250	.529
1968–1989	Enos Semore	22	851–370–1	.697
1990	Stan Meek	1	31–26	.544
1991–2005	Larry Cochell	15	511–336–1	.603
2006–2013	Sunny Golloway	8	346–201–1	.632
2014–2017	Pete Hughes	4	128–107–1	.544
2018–present	Skip Johnson	9	310–198–0	.610
Totals	10 coaches	121	2,770–1,624–13	.630

Longest tenure
Rank	Name	Seasons
1	Jack Baer	26
2	Enos Semore	22
3	Bennie Owen	17

Most wins
Rank	Name	Wins
1	Enos Semore	851
2	Larry Cochell	511
3	Sunny Golloway	346

Best winning pct.
Rank	Name	Pct.
1	Bill Owen	.764
2	Lawrence Haskell	.702
3	Enos Semore	.697

== Year-by-year NCAA Division I results ==
Records taken from the 2017 Oklahoma Sooners baseball media guide page 64.

Year-by-year results
Year	Head coach	Overall	Winning %	Conference	Winning %	Conf. finish	Notes
1898	No coach	2–1	.667	–	–	–	
1899	No coach	2–1	.667	–	–	–	
1900	No coach	1–3	.250	–	–	–	
No teams from 1901 to 1903
1904	No coach	4–5–1	.450	–	–	–	
1905	No coach	1–3	.250	–	–	–	
1906	Bennie Owen	10–6	.625	–	–	–	
1907	Bennie Owen	12–5	.706	–	–	–	
No team in 1908
1909	Bennie Owen	13–4	.765	–	–	–	
1910	Bennie Owen	11–9	.550	–	–	–	
1911	Bennie Owen	11–6	.647	–	–	–	
1912	Bennie Owen	6–6–1	.541	–	–	–	
1913	Bennie Owen	11–6	.647	–	–	–	
1914	Bennie Owen	12–7–1	.625	–	–	–	
1915	Bennie Owen	17–4	.810	–	–	–	
1916	Bennie Owen	7–9	.438	–	–	–	
No team in 1917
1918	Bennie Owen	10–6	.625	–	–	–	
1919	Bennie Owen	6–7	.462	–	–	–	
1920	Bennie Owen	5–8–1	.392	–	–	–	
1921	Bennie Owen	6–9–1	.406	–	–	–	
1922	Bennie Owen	5–10	.333	–	–	–	
1923	Bill Owen	12–4	.750	–	–	–	
1924	Bill Owen	9–3	.750	–	–	–	
1925	Bill Owen	11–2	.846	10–1	.909	–	MVIAA Champions
1926	Bill Owen	10–4	.714	8–4	.667	–	MVIAA Champions
1927	Lawrence Haskell	12–5	.706	12–5	.706	–	MVIAA Champions
1928	Lawrence Haskell	7–9	.438	–	–	–	
1929	Lawrence Haskell	9–7–1	.559	5–6	.455	4th	
1930	Lawrence Haskell	11–4–1	.719	9–3–1	.731	t-1st	Big 8 Champions
1931	Lawrence Haskell	10–1	.909	6–1	.857	t-1st	Big 8 Champions
1932	Lawrence Haskell	5–7	.417	1–3	.250	5th	
1933	Lawrence Haskell	11–5	.688	3–2	.600	t-1st	Big 8 Champions
1934	Lawrence Haskell	15–3	.833	4–2	.667	–	
1935	Lawrence Haskell	14–3	.824	7–0	1.000	1st	Big 8 Champions
1936	Lawrence Haskell	18–3	.857	6–0	1.000	t-1st	Big 8 Champions
1937	Lawrence Haskell	13–5	.722	6–1	.857	6th	
1938	Lawrence Haskell	12–6	.667	6–2	.750	2nd	
1939	Lawrence Haskell	14–5	.737	9–1	.900	1st	Big 6 Champions
1940	Lawrence Haskell	16–5	.762	9–1	.900	1st	Big 6 Champions
1941	Lawrence Haskell	9–6	.600	6–2	.750	2nd	
1942	Jack Baer	17–7	.708	6–1	.857	2nd	
No teams from 1943–1945 due to World War II
1946	Jack Baer	17–3	.850	5–1	.857	1st	Big 6 Champions
1947	Jack Baer	15–13	.536	7–4	.636	1st	Big 6 Champions
1948	Jack Baer	7–14	.333	5–9	.357	6th	
1949	Jack Baer	10–10	.500	7–5	.583	2nd	
1950	Jack Baer	14–8	.636	7–5	.583	3rd	
1951	Jack Baer	19–9	.679	10–1	.909	1st	Big 7 Champions; CWS Champions
1952	Jack Baer	7–14	.333	4–7	.364	6th	
1953	Jack Baer	11–11	.500	7–2	.778	1st	Big 7 Champions
1954	Jack Baer	12–8	.600	8–4	.667	2nd	
1955	Jack Baer	13–10	.565	9–1	.900	1st	Big 7 Champions
1956	Jack Baer	11–7	.611	7–2	.778	1st	Big 7 Champions
1957	Jack Baer	10–8	.556	9–6	.600	2nd	
1958	Jack Baer	12–8	.600	11–5	.688	3rd	
1959	Jack Baer	12–11	.522	7–10	.412	5th	
1960	Jack Baer	13–10	.565	12–7	.632	3rd	
1961	Jack Baer	10–15	.400	9–10	.474	5th	
1962	Jack Baer	9–17	.346	8–13	.381	7th	
1963	Jack Baer	14–10	.583	13–5	.722	2nd	
1964	Jack Baer	17–10	.630	13–8	.619	2nd	
1965	Jack Baer	7–20	.259	6–15	.286	8th	
1966	Jack Baer	13–11	.542	11–6	.647	2nd	
1967	Jack Baer	11–16	.407	11–9	.550	3rd	
1968	Enos Semore	13–14	.481	10–8	.556	3rd	
1969	Enos Semore	23–10	.697	17–4	.810	2nd	
1970	Enos Semore	20–17	.541	10–9	.526	4th	
1971	Enos Semore	24–11	.686	13–8	.619	T-2nd	
1972	Enos Semore	35–17	.673	12–8	.600	1st	Big 8 Champions
1973	Enos Semore	48–12	.800	17–4	.810	1st	Big 8 Champions
1974	Enos Semore	43–8	.843	18–3	.857	1st	Big 8 Champions
1975	Enos Semore	52–10	.839	15–3	.833	1st	Big 8 Champions
1976	Enos Semore	62–19	.765	4–2	.667	2nd	
1977	Enos Semore	37–11	.771	9–1	.900	T-1st	Big 8 Champions; Big 8 Tournament champions
1978	Enos Semore	39–20	.661	10–2	.833	1st	Big 8 Champions
1979	Enos Semore	36–27	.571	12–8	.600	T-3rd	Big 8 Tournament Champions
1980	Enos Semore	33–24–1	.578	8–10	.444	5th	
1981	Enos Semore	40–15	.727	11–13	.458	5th	
1982	Enos Semore	35–25	.583	11–6	.647	3rd	
1983	Enos Semore	39–20	.661	18–6	.750	2nd	
1984	Enos Semore	42–15	.737	14–4	.778	2nd	
1985	Enos Semore	55–14	.797	18–6	.750	2nd	
1986	Enos Semore	44–21	.677	19–3	.864	1st	Big 8 Champions
1987	Enos Semore	42–20	.667	17–7	.708	2nd	
1988	Enos Semore	45–21	.682	16–8	.667	2nd	
1989	Enos Semore	44–19	.698	18–6	.750	3rd	
1990	Stan Meek	31–26	.544	9–15	.375	7th	
1991	Larry Cochell	40–23	.635	13–11	.542	2nd	
1992	Larry Cochell	43–24	.642	17–7	.708	T-1st	
1993	Larry Cochell	31–24	.564	13–14	.481	5th	
1994	Larry Cochell	50–17	.746	21–9	.700	2nd	CWS Champions
1995	Larry Cochell	42–16	.724	21–7	.750	1st	Big 8 Champions
1996	Larry Cochell	32–25	.561	14–12	.538	3rd	
1997	Larry Cochell	39–20	.661	18–11	.621	4th	Big 12 Tournament Champions
1998	Larry Cochell	42–20	.677	17–11	.607	4th	
1999	Larry Cochell	30–29	.508	12–18	.333	8th	
2000	Larry Cochell	41–23	.641	20–10	.667	3rd	
2001	Larry Cochell	25–33–1	.432	13–16–1	.450	7th	
2002	Larry Cochell	35–27	.565	15–12	.556	4th	
2003	Larry Cochell	23–31	.426	10–17	.370	7th	
2004	Larry Cochell	38–24	.613	19–8	.704	2nd	
2005	Cochell/Golloway	35–26	.574	14–13	.519	5th	
2006	Sunny Golloway	45–22	.672	17–10	.630	3rd	
2007	Sunny Golloway	34–24	.586	11–16	.407	7th	
2008	Sunny Golloway	36–26–1	.579	9–17–1	.352	8th	
2009	Sunny Golloway	43–20	.683	17–10	.630	2nd	
2010	Sunny Golloway	50–18	.735	15–10	.600	2nd	
2011	Sunny Golloway	41–19	.721	14–11	.560	3rd	
2012	Sunny Golloway	42–25	.627	13–10	.565	4th	
2013	Sunny Golloway	43–21	.672	13–11	.542	4th	Big 12 Tournament Champions
2014	Pete Hughes	29–29	.500	8–16	.333	8th	
2015	Pete Hughes	34–27	.557	13–11	.542	3rd	
2016	Pete Hughes	30–27–1	.526	11–13	.458	5th	
2017	Pete Hughes	35–24	.593	12–11	.522	3rd	
2018	Skip Johnson	38–25	.603	14–10	.583	4th	
2019	Skip Johnson	33–23	.589	11–13	.458	6th	
2020	Skip Johnson	14–4	.778	0–0	–	Season cut short by the COVID-19 pandemic.	
2021	Skip Johnson	27–28	.491	11–13	.458	5th	
2022	Skip Johnson	45–24	.652	15–9	.625	3rd	Big 12 Tournament Champions / CWS Runner-up
2023	Skip Johnson	32–28	.533	11–13	.458	7th	
2024	Skip Johnson	40–21	.656	23–7	.767	1st	Big 12 Champions
2025	Skip Johnson	38–22	.633	14–16	.467	12th	
2026	Skip Johnson	43–23	.652	14–16	.467	11th	CWS Champions

== Championships ==
=== National championships ===
Season	Record	Head coach
1951	19–9	Jack Baer
1994	50–17	Larry Cochell
2026	43–23	Skip Johnson
Three national championships

=== Conference tournament championships ===
Season	Conference	Head coach
1977	Big Eight	Enos Semore
1997	Big 12	Larry Cochell
2013	Big 12	Sunny Golloway
2022	Big 12	Skip Johnson
Four conference tournament championships

== OU in the NCAA tournament ==
- The NCAA Division I baseball tournament started in 1947.
- The format of the tournament has changed through the years.

Year	Record	Pct	Notes
1947	0–1	.000	Lost in Western playoff bracket
1951	4–0	1.000	College World Series champions
1955	1–2	.333	Lost in District 5 series to Oklahoma St.
1956	0–1	.000	Eliminated by North Dakota State in NCAA District Tournament
1972	3–2	.600	NCAA tournament District Champions; College World Series (5th Place)
1973	4–2	.667	NCAA tournament District Champions; College World Series (5th Place)
1974	3–2	.600	NCAA tournament District Champions; College World Series (5th Place)
1975	7–3	.700	Won the Midwest Regional; College World Series (3rd Place)
1976	3–3	.500	Won the South Central Regional; College World Series (7th Place)
1977	1–2	.333	Eliminated by Michigan in NCAA South Central Regional
1979	1–2	.333	Eliminated by Hawaii in the Midwest Regional
1982	2–2	.500	Eliminated by Eastern Michigan in NCAA Central Regional
1984	0–2	.000	Eliminated by Lamar in NCAA Central Regional
1985	2–2	.500	Eliminated by Lamar in NCAA Central Regional
1986	1–2	.333	Eliminated by Tulane in NCAA South I Regional
1987	0–2	.000	Eliminated by Texas in NCAA Central Regional
1988	0–2	.000	Eliminated by Arizona St. in NCAA West II Regional
1989	1–2	.333	Eliminated by Loyola Marymoun in NCAA WEst I Regional
1991	0–2	.000	Eliminated by LSU in NCAA South Regional
1992	5–3	.625	Won NCAA Mideast Regional; College World Series (5th Place)
1994	8–0	1.000	Won NCAA Central Regional; College World Series champions
1995	4–2	.667	Won NCAA Midwest II Regional; College World Series (7th Place)
1997	0–2	.000	Eliminated by LSU in NCAA South I Regional
1998	2–2	.500	Eliminated by Auburn in the Atlantic II Regional
2000	2–2	.500	Lost to UCLA in the Oklahoma City Regional Finals
2002	0–2	.000	Eliminated by Wichita State in the Wichita Regional
2004	1–2	.333	Eliminated by UCLA in the Oklahoma City Regional
2005	2–2	.500	Lost to Ole Miss in the Oxford Regional Finals
2006	5–3	.625	Won the Norman Regional; Lost to Rice in the Houston Super Regional
2008	2–2	.500	Lost to Arizona State in the Tempe Regional Finals
2009	2–2	.500	Lost to Arkansas in the Norman Regional Finals
2010	6–3	.667	Won the Norman Regional; Won the Charlottesville Super Regional; College World Series (5th Place)
2011	0–2	.000	Eliminated by Oral Roberts in the Fort Worth Regional
2012	4–3	.571	Won the Charlottesville Regional; Lost to South Carolina in the Columbia Super Regional
2013	3–2	.600	Won the Blacksburg Regional; Lost to LSU in the Baton Rouge Super Regional
2017	1–2	.333	Eliminated by Xavier in the Louisville Regional
2018	2–2	.500	Lost to Mississippi State in the Tallahassee Regional Final
2022	5–2	.714	Won the Gainesville Regional; Won the Blacksburg Super Regional; Lost to Ole Miss in the College World Series Final
2023	1–2	.333	Eliminated by East Carolina in the Charlottesville Regional
2024	2–2	.500	Eliminated by UConn in the Norman Regional
2025	3–2	.600	Eliminated by North Carolina in the Chapel Hill Regional
2026	11–2	.846	Won the Atlanta Regional; Won the Lawrence Super Regional; College World Series Champions

== Player awards ==
=== All Americans ===
The following is a listing of first team selections. Other selections are available at Oklahoma's official web site.

- 1953

Gene Sheets (2B)

- 1971

Glen Castle (SS)

- 1972

Bobby Jack (2B)

- 1976

Kelly Snider (1B)

- 1979

Nick Capra (2B)

- 1983

Ray Hayward (P)

- 1985

Bobby Witt (P)

- 1986

Kevin Burdick (dh)

- 1992

Brian Eldridge (2B)

- 1994

Rick Guiterrez (2B)

- 1995

Mark Redman (P)

- 1997

Javier Flores (C)

- 2000

Jeff Bajenaru (utl)

- 2009

J.T. Wise (C) – NCBWA

=== All College World Series ===
The following is a listing of first team selections. Other selections are available at USC's official web site.
^ denotes player was named MOP of the College World Series

- 1973

Bob Shirley (P)

- 1992

Byron Matthews (OF)

- 1994

Ryan Minor (1B)
Rick Gutierrez (2B)
Darvin Traylor (OF)
Chip Glass^ (OF)
Mark Redman (P)

=== All-Conference teams ===
Selections from 1958 were affiliated with the Big 7 conference, selections from 1976–1996 were affiliated with the Big 8 conference, and selections from 1997 on were affiliated with the Big 12 conference.
^ and ^^ respectively denote Big Eight and Big 12 Conference Player of the Year
* and ** respectively denote Big Eight and Big 12 Conference Newcomer of the Year

- 1958

Eddie Fisher (P)
Dennis Price (2B)

- 1959

Brewster Hobby (OF)
Don Nipp (C)

- 1960

George Kernek (1B)
Paul Mersch (1B)
Don Nipp (C)

- 1961

George Kernek (1B)

- 1963

Dale Mitchell (OF)

- 1964

Jann Christian (SS)
John Kern (1B)
Dale Mitchell (OF)

- 1965

Carl Schreiner (OF)

- 1966

Jay Cronley (2B)

- 1967

Gary Harper (2B)
Tom Maxwell (3B)
Ralph Rickey (OF)

- 1968

Gary Brooks (C)
Dick Turner (OF)

- 1969

Chris Rickey (3B)
Mike Swenton (OF)

- 1970

Scott Harrington (2B)
Bobby Jack (1B)
Mike Swenton (OF)

- 1971

Glen Gastle (SS)
Bobby Jack (1B)
Mike Swenton (OF)
Gary Weese (P)

- 1972

Bobby Jack (1B)
Joe Simpson (OF)
Jackson Todd (P)
Bill Severns (OF)

- 1973

Joe Simpson (OF)
Jackson Todd (P)
Mike Umfleet (3B)

- 1974

Keith Drumright (2B)
Kenny King (OF)
Stan Lawrence (dh)
Stan Meek (P)
Mike Umfleet (3B)

- 1975

Jacky Parish (C)
Bill Severns (OF)
Bob Shirley (P)
Mike Umfleet (3B)

- 1976

Terry Bogener (OF)
Keith Drumright (2B)
Gary Krug (dh)
Kelly Snider (1B)

- 1977

Gary Krug (1B)
Roger LaFrancois (C)
Mark Nipp (P)
Gary Thweatt (OF)

- 1978

Terry Bogener (OF)
Mark Nipp (P)

- 1979

Nick Capra (2B)
David Luethy (SS)
Bryan Stafford (OF)
Tommy Thompson (3B)

- 1980

Robb Glendening (2B)
Fran Meraz (OF)

- 1981

Ray Hayward (p/1B)
John Russell (OF)

- 1982

Kevin Bates (2B)
John Russell (OF)

- 1983

Ray Hayward (p/dh)
Ron Leon (OF)
Jay Searcy (3B)
Paul Williams (OF)

- 1984

Ron Leon (OF)
Rusty McGinnis (1B)
Bobby Witt (P)

- 1985

Rusty McGinnis (1B)
Steve Peters (P)
John Toal (2B)
Bobby Witt (P)

- 1986

Kevin Burdick (utl)
Scott Hamilton (P)
Kevin Pearson (SS)

- 1987

Jack Armstrong (P)
Baine Brooks (OF)
Kevin Burdick (2B)
Chris Ebright (OF)

- 1988

Chris Ebright (OF)

- 1989

Mark Cole (SS)
Darron Cox^ (C)
Chris Ebright (OF)
Kevin King (P)

- 1990

Scott Campbell (of/3B)

- 1991

Brian Eldridge (2B)
Scott Moore (P)
Mary Neff (OF)

- 1992

Brian Eldridge (2B)
Jason Evans (dh)
Zak Krislock (P)
Casey Mendenhall (P)

- 1993

Rick Gutierrez (2B)
Rich Hills (SS)

- 1994

Bucky Buckles (P)
Rick Gutierrez^ (2B)
Rich Hills (SS)
Mark Redman* (P)
Darvin Traylor (OF)

- 1995

Javier Flores (C)
Rich Hills (SS)
Mark Redman (P)
Aric Thomas (OF)

- 1996

Bobby Brown (OF)
Javier Flores (C)

- 1997

Casey Bookout (dh)
Javier Flores (C)
Geoff Geary (P)

- 1998

Casey Bookout (dh)
Geoff Geary (P)
Corey Hart (inf)
Willy Hill (OF)
Derek Wathan (SS)

- 1999

Casey Bookout (dh)

- 2000

Jeff Bajenaru (OF)
Jason Bartlett (3B)

- 2001

Greg Dobbs** (OF)

- 2002

Jason Fransz (OF)

- 2003

Eddie Cornejo (2B)

- 2004

Jarod McAuliff (P)
Russell Raley (2B)

- 2007

Bryant Hernandez (inf)
Jame Johnson (OF)
J.T. Wise^^ (C)

=== Conference All-Tournament teams ===
Selections from 1976–1996 were affiliated with the Big 8 conference, and selections from 1997 on were affiliated with the Big 12 conference.
^ denotes player was selected as the MVP of the tournament.

- 1976

Keith Drumright (2B)
Greg Stitzinger (3B)
Roger LaFrancois (C)
Ken Palmer (P)

- 1977

Greg Krug (1B)
Art Toal (2B)
Mike Cunico (SS)
Tommy Thompson (3B)
Gary Thweatt (OF)
Terry Bogener (dh)
Roger LaFrancois (C)
Mark Nipp^ (P)

- 1978

Don Morris (OF)
Mark Nipp (P)

- 1979

Nick Capra^ (2B)
David Luethy (SS)
Donnie Graham (OF)
Josh Randall (P)
Tom Kohl (P)

- 1982

Greg Carlton (3B)
John Russell (OF)
Darrell Rodgers (P)

- 1983

Ron Leon (OF)
Ray Hayward (P)
Pete Zeegers (P)

- 1984

Rusty McGinnis (1B)
Jay Searcy (3B)
Ron Leon (OF)
John Toal (dh)
Keith Hamilton (P)

- 1985

Rusty McGinnis (1B)
Jim Richardson (3B)
Andy Franks (OF)
Keith Hamilton (P)
Steve Peters (P)

- 1986

John Toal (2B)
Tony Gwinn (C)
Chris Stull (OF)
Scott Hamilton (P)

- 1987

Kevin Burdick (SS)
Chris Ebright (OF)
Baine Brooks (OF)
Jack Armstrong (P)
Mike Hensley (P)

- 1988

Mark Cole (SS)
Chris Ebright (OF)
Todd Butler (OF)
Matt Anderson (dh)
Chris Burgin (P)

- 1989

Mark Cole (SS)

- 1991

Derrick White (1B)
Brian Eldridge (2B)
Matt Ruebel (P)

- 1992

Jason Evans (3B)
Greg Norton (SS)
Scott Marr (OF)
Britt Bonneau (OF)
Clifton Foster (P)

- 1993

Rich Hills (3B)

- 1994

Ryan Minor (1B)
Rick Gutierrez (2B)
M.J. Mariani (3B)
Rich Hills (SS)
Chip Glass (OF)
Bucky Buckles (P)

- 1995

Tristan Paul (3B)

- 1996

Javier Flores (C)
Brian Shackelford (util)

- 1997

Javier Flores (C)
Corey Hart (2B)
Derek Wathan (SS)
Brian Shackelford^ (OF)
Jeff Andra (P)

- 1998

Rick Park (dh)

- 1999

Bobby Walters (OF)
Rick Park (dh)

- 2000

Rick Park (1B)
Zach Lekse (2B)

- 2001

Jason Bartlett (3B)
Greg Dobbs (util)

- 2002

Jason Fransz (OF)
Mark Roberts (P)

- 2007

Joseph Hughes (OF)
Aaron Reza (3B)

- 2008

Andrew Doyle (P)

- 2009

Andrew Doyle (P)
Jamie Johnson (OF)
J.T Wise (C)

== See also ==
- List of NCAA Division I baseball programs
