= 1951 Princeton Tigers baseball team =

American college baseball season

1951 Princeton Tigers baseball

EIBL Champions District II Champions

College World Series, T-7th
- Conference: Eastern Intercollegiate Baseball League
- Record: 20–6 (7–2 EIBL)
- Head coach: Emerson Dickman (3rd season)
- Captain: Willard Prior
- Home stadium: Bill Clarke Field

1951 Eastern Intercollegiate Baseball League baseball standings
	Conf.						Overall
Team	W		L		T	PCT	W		L		T	PCT
Princeton ‍†‍‍^{y}	7	–	2	–	0	.778	20	–	6	–	0	.769
Brown ‍‍‍	6	–	2	–	0	.750	12	–	5	–	0	.706
Columbia ‍‍‍	6	–	3	–	0	.667	10	–	7	–	0	.588
Cornell ‍‍‍	5	–	3	–	0	.625	13	–	5	–	0	.722
Navy ‍‍‍	5	–	3	–	0	.625	10	–	11	–	0	.476
Penn ‍‍‍	4	–	5	–	0	.444	9	–	10	–	0	.474
Harvard ‍‍‍	3	–	5	–	0	.375	7	–	9	–	0	.438
Army ‍‍‍	3	–	6	–	0	.333	8	–	14	–	1	.370
Yale ‍‍‍	2	–	6	–	0	.250	16	–	14	–	0	.533
Dartmouth ‍‍‍	1	–	7	–	0	.125	4	–	22	–	1	.167
† – Conference champion y – Invited to the College World Series

The 1951 Princeton Tigers baseball team represented Princeton University in the 1951 NCAA baseball season. The Tigers played their home games at Bill Clarke Field. The team was coached by Emerson Dickman serving his 3rd year at Princeton.

The Tigers won the Eastern Intercollegiate Baseball League championship and advanced to the College World Series, where they were defeated by the Tennessee Volunteers.

== Roster ==
1951 Princeton Tigers baseball team
Players
Coaches

#	Pos.	Name	B/T	Height	Weight	Year	Home town
		Lawrence Becker	/	—	—	Sr
		John Blessing	/	—	—	Jr
		Harry Brightman	/	—	—	Jr
	P	Ray Chirurgi	/	—	—	Jr
		Sam DeCou	/	—	—	Jr
	P	John Emery	/	—	—	Jr
		James Fairchild	/	—	—	Sr
		Peter Fleming	/	—	—	Sr
		Joseph Fromm	/	—	—	So
	INF	Joseph Golden	/	—	—	So
		Edward Irvin	/	—	—	Sr
		Michael Kearns	/	—	—	Sr
		Hobert Kreitler	/	—	—	Jr
		Willard Pryor (C)	/	—	—	Sr
		Frank Reichel	/	—	—	Sr
		John Reydel	/	—	—	Sr
	RHP	Dave Sisler	R/R	6 ft 4 in (1.93 m)	200 lb (91 kg)	So	St. Louis, Missouri
		Charles Townsend	/	—	—	Sr
		Charles Weeden	/	—	—	Sr

Head coach

Emerson Dickman

Assistant coach(es)

Legend

- (C) Team captain
- (S) Suspended
- (I) Ineligible
- Injured
- Current redshirt

== Schedule ==
1951 Princeton Tigers baseball game log
Regular season
April (10–2)

#	Date	Opponent	Site/stadium	Score	Overall record	EIBL record
1	April	CCNY	Bill Clarke Field • Princeton, New Jersey	2–1	1–0	0–0
2	April	Manhattan	Bill Clarke Field • Princeton, New Jersey	2–0	2–0	0–0
3	April	Moravian	Bill Clarke Field • Princeton, New Jersey	2–1	3–0	0–0
4	April	Temple	Bill Clarke Field • Princeton, New Jersey	8–1	4–0	0–0
5	April	NYU	Bill Clarke Field • Princeton, New Jersey	4–5	4–1	0–0
6	April	at Penn	River Field • Philadelphia, Pennsylvania	6–4	5–1	1–0
7	April	Villanova	Unknown • Philadelphia, Pennsylvania	4–3	6–1	1–0
8	April	at Columbia	Robertson Field at Satow Stadium • New York, New York	3–4	6–2	1–1
9	April	Fordham	Bill Clarke Field • Princeton, New Jersey	6–2	7–2	1–1
10	April	at Navy	Bill Clarke Field • Princeton, New Jersey	6–2	8–2	2–1
11	April	at Army	Johnson Stadium at Doubleday Field • West Point, New York	6–4	9–2	3–1
12	April	Cornell	Bill Clarke Field • Princeton, New Jersey	4–3	10–2	4–1

May (7–2)

#	Date	Opponent	Site/stadium	Score	Overall record	EIBL record
13	May 1	at Rutgers	Unknown Field • Piscataway, New Jersey	4–3	11–2	4–1
14	May	Dartmouth	Bill Clarke Field • Princeton, New Jersey	10–7	12–2	5–1
15	May	Georgetown	Bill Clarke Field • Princeton, New Jersey	4–1	13–2	5–1
16	May	at Brown	Unknown • Providence, Rhode Island	2–6	13–3	5–2
17	May	Colgate	Bill Clarke Field • Princeton, New Jersey	8–0	14–3	5–2
18	May	Lafayette	Bill Clarke Field • Princeton, New Jersey	2–1	15–3	5–2
19	May	Seton Hall	Bill Clarke Field • Princeton, New Jersey	8–3	16–3	5–2
20	May	Penn	Bill Clarke Field • Princeton, New Jersey	5–0	17–3	6–2
21	May	at Yale	Yale Field • West Haven, Connecticut	1–2	17–4	6–2

June (2–0)

#	Date	Opponent	Site/stadium	Score	Overall record	EIBL record
22	June 6	Rutgers	Bill Clarke Field • Princeton, New Jersey	2–1	18–4	6–2
23	June	Yale	Bill Clarke Field • Princeton, New Jersey	7–6	19–4	7–2

Postseason
College World Series (0–2)

#	Date	Opponent	Site/stadium	Score	Overall record	EIBL record
24	June 8	vs USC	Omaha Municipal Stadium • Omaha, Nebraska	1–4	19–5	6–2
25	June 9	vs Tennessee	Omaha Municipal Stadium • Omaha, Nebraska	2–3	19–6	6–2

June (1–0)

#	Date	Opponent	Site/stadium	Score	Overall record	EIBL record
26	June 19	at Harvard	Soldier's Field • Boston, Massachusetts	7–5	20–6	7–2
