= Bill Owen (baseball) =

Coaching career (HC unless noted)
- 1923–1926: Oklahoma

Head coaching record
- Overall: 42–13

Accomplishments and honors

Championships
- 2 MVIAA

Bill Owen was the head baseball coach at the University of Oklahoma from 1923 until 1926. During his tenure, the Sooners won 42 games and secured two conference championships. Owen was the brother of Bennie Owen, who also served as the head football and men's basketball coach for the Sooners.

== Head coaching record ==
Record table
Season	Team	Overall	Conference	Standing	Postseason
Oklahoma Sooners (Missouri Valley Intercollegiate Athletic Association) (1923–1926)
1923	Oklahoma	12–4	4–2	2nd	
1924	Oklahoma	9–3	3–2	4th	
1925	Oklahoma	11–2	10–1	1st	
1926	Oklahoma	10–4	8–4	1st	
Oklahoma:		42–13 (.764)			
Total:		42–13 (.764)			
National champion Postseason invitational champion Conference regular season champion Conference regular season and conference tournament champion Division regular season champion Division regular season and conference tournament champion Conference tournament champion
