= Jack Baer =

American college football player and baseball player/coach

Biographical details
- Born: October 29, 1914; Shawnee, Oklahoma, U.S.
- Died: March 9, 2002 (aged 87)

Playing career
- 1936–1938: Oklahoma

Coaching career (HC unless noted)
- 1942–1967: Oklahoma

Head coaching record
- Overall: 281–250 (.529)

Accomplishments and honors

Championships
- 1951 College World Series

Awards
- First-team All-Big Six (1937)

Jack Baer (October 29, 1914 – March 9, 2002) was an American college football and baseball player and a college baseball coach.

== Career ==
Baer was the son of Herman and Anna Baer. He was a 1933 Shawnee High School graduate where he was an all-round athlete. He was offered a contract with the New York Yankees but opted to play football and baseball at the University of Oklahoma. He played centerfield for the Sooners. He also was a quarterback on the school's football team and set records as a punter and kicker. He was named All-Big Six. At one point, he held the record for field goals after booting a 47-yarder.

Baer served in the United States Navy as a lieutenant during World War II as a physical fitness instructor and played football at Del Monte Pre-Flight School.

== Coaching career ==
Baer was the fourth head baseball coach at the University of Oklahoma, beginning his tenure in 1942 before he served in the U.S. Navy. During his tenure, Oklahoma won one national championship in 1951 when he's team won the College World Series, made five NCAA Tournament appearances, and won 6 conference titles. His team had a .529 winning percentage. He was the coach until he retired in 1968 when he worked in the football program as a scout and assistant coach and finally retiring as the equipment manager.

Baer died on March 9, 2002. He's buried in the IOOF Cemetery in Norman, Oklahoma.

== Head coaching record ==
Statistics overview
Season	Team	Overall	Conference	Standing	Postseason
Oklahoma Sooners (Big Six/Big Seven/Big Eight Conference) (1942–1967)
1942	Oklahoma	17–7	6–1	2nd	
1946	Oklahoma	17–3	5–1	1st	
1947	Oklahoma	15–13	7–4	1st	NCAA Western playoff
1948	Oklahoma	7–14	5–9	6th	
1949	Oklahoma	10–10	7–5	2nd	
1950	Oklahoma	14–8	7–5	3rd	
1951	Oklahoma	19–9	10–1	1st	College World Series Champion
1952	Oklahoma	7–14	4–7	6th	
1953	Oklahoma	11–11	7–2	1st	
1954	Oklahoma	12–8	8–4	2nd	
1955	Oklahoma	13–10	9–1	1st	NCAA District 5
1956	Oklahoma	11–7	7–2	1st	NCAA District 5
1957	Oklahoma	10–8	9–6	2nd	
1958	Oklahoma	12–8	11–5	3rd	
1959	Oklahoma	12–11	7–10	5th	
1960	Oklahoma	13–10	12–7	3rd	
1961	Oklahoma	10–15	9–10	5th	
1962	Oklahoma	9–17	8–13	7th	
1963	Oklahoma	14–10	13–5	2nd	
1964	Oklahoma	17–10	13–8	2nd	
1965	Oklahoma	7–20	6–15	8th	
1966	Oklahoma	13–11	11–6	2nd	
1967	Oklahoma	11–16	11–9	3rd	
Oklahoma:		281–250 (.529)	192–136 (.585)		
Total:		281–250 (.529)			
National champion Postseason invitational champion Conference regular season champion Conference regular season and conference tournament champion Division regular season champion Division regular season and conference tournament champion Conference tournament champion
