= 1951 Ohio State Buckeyes baseball team =

American college baseball season

1951 Ohio State Buckeyes baseball

Big Ten Conference

1951 College World Series, T-7th
- Conference: Big Ten Conference
- Record: 23–15 (10–2 Big Ten)
- Head coach: Marty Karow (1st season)
- Captain: Carlton Parrill
- Home stadium: Varsity Diamond

1951 Big Ten Conference baseball standings
	Conf.						Overall
Team	W		L		T	PCT	W		L		T	PCT
Ohio State ‍†‍‍^{y}	10	–	2	–	0	.833	23	–	15	–	0	.605
Illinois ‍‍‍	8	–	3	–	0	.727	16	–	9	–	0	.640
Indiana ‍‍‍	6	–	4	–	1	.591	16	–	10	–	1	.611
Minnesota ‍‍‍	6	–	6	–	0	.500	15	–	10	–	0	.600
Wisconsin ‍‍‍	5	–	5	–	1	.500	14	–	8	–	1	.630
Northwestern ‍‍‍	5	–	6	–	0	.455	11	–	9	–	0	.550
Michigan State ‍‍‍	4	–	6	–	0	.400	17	–	9	–	0	.654
Iowa ‍‍‍	4	–	8	–	0	.333	11	–	13	–	0	.458
Michigan ‍‍‍	4	–	8	–	0	.333	13	–	10	–	0	.565
Purdue ‍‍‍	2	–	9	–	0	.182	10	–	12	–	1	.457
† – Conference champion y – Invited to the College World Series; As of June 30, 1951; Rankings from Collegiate Baseball

The 1951 Ohio State Buckeyes baseball team represented the Ohio State University in the 1951 NCAA baseball season. The head coach was Marty Karow, serving his 1st year.

The Buckeyes lost in the College World Series, defeated by the Texas A&M Aggies.

== Roster ==
1951 Ohio State Buckeyes baseball team
Players
Coaches

#	Pos.	Name	B/T	Height	Weight	Year	Home town
	P	Edward Bohnslav	/	—	—
		Paul Bechtel	/	—	—	So
		Alan Bicknaver	/	—	—
	C	John Gannon	/	—	—
		Elbert Goodwiller	/	—	—
		Elbert Gutzwiller	/	—	—
	P	Dick Hauck	/	—	—
		Stewart Hein	/	—	—
		Jack Jones	/	—	—	So
		Victor Kauffman	/	—	—	Sr
		William Kracker	/	—	—
		David Leonhard	/	—	—
	C	Robert Mann	/	—	—
		Bob Montebello	/	—	—
		Howard Moran	/	—	—	Sr
		Louis Murdock	/	—	—
		Carlton Parrill (C)	/	—	—	Sr
	P	Harry Scutt	/	—	—
	P	Paul Williams	/	—	—	Jr
		William Zimmer	/	—	—	Jr

Head coach

Marty Karow

Assistant coach(es)

Legend

- (C) Team captain
- (S) Suspended
- (I) Ineligible
- Injured
- Current redshirt

== Schedule ==
1951 Ohio State Buckeyes baseball game log
Regular season
March (5–4)

#	Date	Opponent	Site/stadium	Score	Overall record	Big Ten record
1	March 16	at B. A. M. C.	Unknown • San Antonio, Texas	15–3	1–0	0–0
2	March 17	at B. A. M. C.	Unknown • San Antonio, Texas	7–8	1–1	0–0
3	March 19	at Texas	Clark Field • Austin, Texas	0–8	1–2	0–0
4	March 20	at Texas	Clark Field • Austin, Texas	3–4	1–3	0–0
5	March 21	at Rice	Unknown • Houston, Texas	14–6	2–3	0–0
6	March 22	at Rice	Unknown • Houston, Texas	2–3	2–4	0–0
7	March 23	at TCU	Unknown • Fort Worth, Texas	4–2	3–4	0–0
8	March 24	at TCU	Unknown • Fort Worth, Texas	7–3	4–4	0–0
9	March 24	at Washington University	Unknown • St. Louis, Missouri	10–4	5–4	0–0

April (4–4)

#	Date	Opponent	Site/stadium	Score	Overall record	Big Ten record
10	April 6	Bowling Green	Varsity Diamond • Columbus, Ohio	2–0	6–4	0–0
11	April 7	Dayton	Varsity Diamond • Columbus, Ohio	15–1	7–4	0–0
12	April 14	Notre Dame	Varsity Diamond • Columbus, Ohio	0–1	7–5	0–0
13	April 20	Minnesota	Varsity Diamond • Columbus, Ohio	10–9	8–5	1–0
14	April 21	Minnesota	Varsity Diamond • Columbus, Ohio	7–0	9–5	2–0
15	April 24	at Miami (OH)	Unknown • Oxford, Ohio	3–4	9–6	2–0
16	April 27	at Western Michigan	Hyames Field • Kalamazoo, Michigan	2–3	9–7	2–0
17	April 28	at Western Michigan	Hyames Field • Kalamazoo, Michigan	5–7	9–8	2–0

May (10–4)

#	Date	Opponent	Site/stadium	Score	Overall record	Big Ten record
18	May 1	at Ohio	Unknown • Athens, Ohio	7–6	10–8	2–0
19	May 4	Purdue	Varsity Diamond • Columbus, Ohio	12–6	11–8	3–0
20	May 5	Purdue	Varsity Diamond • Columbus, Ohio	14–4	12–8	4–0
21	May 8	Cincinnati	Varsity Diamond • Columbus, Ohio	6–8	12–9	4–0
22	May 9	at Dayton	Unknown • Dayton, Ohio	11–2	13–9	4–0
23	May 12	Indiana	Varsity Diamond • Columbus, Ohio	6–5	14–9	5–0
24	May 12	Indiana	Varsity Diamond • Columbus, Ohio	5–2	15–9	6–0
25	May 15	Ohio	Varsity Diamond • Columbus, Ohio	6–0	16–9	6–0
26	May 18	at Northwestern	Northwestern Park • Evanston, Illinois	1–3	16–10	6–1
27	May 19	at Northwestern	Northwestern Park • Evanston, Illinois	10–3	17–10	7–1
28	May 22	at Cincinnati	Carson Field • Cincinnati, Ohio	8–4	18–10	7–1
29	May 25	Michigan	Varsity Diamond • Columbus, Ohio	4–1	19–10	8–1
30	May 25	Michigan	Varsity Diamond • Columbus, Ohio	3–6	19–11	8–2
31	May 30	Miami (OH)	Varsity Diamond • Columbus, Ohio	3–4	19–12	8–2

June (2–0)

#	Date	Opponent	Site/stadium	Score	Overall record	Big Ten record
32	June 1	at Michigan State	Old College Field • East Lansing, Michigan	8–0	20–12	9–2
33	June 2	at Michigan State	Old College Field • East Lansing, Michigan	9–8	21–12	10–2

Postseason
District IV Tournament (2–1)

#	Date	Opponent	Site/stadium	Score	Overall record	Big Ten record
34	June 8	Western Michigan	Varsity Diamond • Columbus, Ohio	1–0	22–12	10–2
35	June 8	Western Michigan	Varsity Diamond • Columbus, Ohio	2–4	22–13	10–2
36	June 9	Western Michigan	Varsity Diamond • Columbus, Ohio	3–2	23–13	10–2

1951 College World Series (0–2)

#	Date	Opponent	Site/stadium	Score	Overall record	Big Ten record
37	June 13	Oklahoma	Omaha Municipal Stadium • Omaha, Nebraska	8–9	23–14	10–2
38	June 13	Texas A&M	Omaha Municipal Stadium • Omaha, Nebraska	2–3	23–15	10–2

== Awards and honors ==
Dick Hauck

- First Team All-Big Ten

Stewart Hein

- First Team All-Big Ten
