= Beau Bell =

American baseball player (1907–1977)

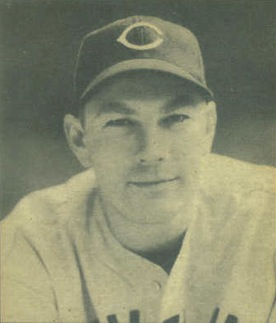
- Right fielder
- Born: August 20, 1907; Bellville, Texas, U.S.
- Died: September 14, 1977 (aged 70); Bryan, Texas, U.S.
- Batted: Right Threw: Right

MLB debut
- April 16, 1935, for the St. Louis Browns

Last MLB appearance
- September 1, 1941, for the Cleveland Indians

MLB statistics
- Batting average: .297
- Home runs: 46
- Runs batted in: 437
- Stats at Baseball Reference

Teams
- St. Louis Browns (1935–1939); Detroit Tigers (1939); Cleveland Indians (1940–1941)

Career highlights and awards
- All-Star (1937)

Roy Chester "Beau" Bell (August 20, 1907 – September 14, 1977) was an American professional baseball outfielder. He played in Major League Baseball (MLB) from 1935 to 1941 for the St. Louis Browns, Detroit Tigers, and Cleveland Indians. Bell was named to the 1937 American League All-Star Team.

Bell finished 13th in voting for the 1936 American League MVP for playing in 155 games and having 616 at bats, 100 runs, 212 hits, 40 doubles, 12 triples, 11 home runs, 123 runs batted in, four stolen bases, 60 base on balls, a .344 batting average, .403 on-base percentage, .502 slugging percentage, 309 total bases and six sacrifice hits.

He finished 17th in voting for the 1937 AL MVP for leading the league in hits (218) and doubles (51) and playing in 156 games and having 642 at bats, 82 runs, eight triples, 14 home runs, 117 runs batted in, two stolen bases, 53 base on balls, a .340 batting average, .391 on-base percentage, .509 slugging percentage, 327 total bases and three sacrifice hits. His 51 doubles remains an Orioles single season record.

In seven seasons Bell played in 767 games and had 2,718 at bats, 378 runs, 806 hits, 165 doubles, 32 triples, 46 home runs, 437 runs batted in, 11 stolen bases, 272 base on balls, a .297 batting average, .362 on-base percentage, .432 slugging percentage, 1,173 total bases and 26 sacrifice hits.

An alumnus of the University of Houston and Texas A&M University, he died in Bryan, Texas at the age of 70.

== See also ==
- List of Major League Baseball annual doubles leaders
