= Sidney Hatfield =

American baseball player and coach

- Pitcher / First baseman
- Born: August 29, 1929
- Died: January 25, 2003 (aged 73); Knoxville, Tennessee, U.S.
- Batted: Right
- Stats at Baseball Reference

Sidney "Sid" Hatfield (August 29, 1929 – January 25, 2003) was an American baseball player, coach and educator. He was named the College World Series Most Outstanding Player in 1951 while playing for the Tennessee Volunteers baseball team. During his playing career, he appeared as a shortstop, first baseman and pitcher.

== Playing career ==
Hatfield played college baseball at the University of Tennessee. On the 1951 Tennessee roster, he was listed as a sophomore and played shortstop, first base and pitcher. During the 1951 College World Series, he pitched a complete-game shutout against Springfield and pitched seven innings in the championship game against Oklahoma, which Tennessee lost 3–2. He was named the tournament's Most Outstanding Player, becoming Tennessee's first recipient of the award.

After his college career, Hatfield played briefly in Minor League Baseball. He was listed on the 1953 roster of the Jacksonville Beach Sea Birds of the Florida State League. His minor league record is also listed by Baseball-Reference.com.

== Coaching and later life ==
Hatfield graduated from the University of Tennessee in 1954 with a degree in education. He later taught and coached at Rule High School in Knoxville, Tennessee, for 10 years, interrupted by two years of military service. He served in the United States Army in Korea and later remained active in the Air National Guard, reaching the rank of lieutenant colonel.

Hatfield later worked at Tennessee Technological University, where he taught, served as an assistant basketball coach and was head baseball coach from 1965 to 1967. His baseball teams at Tennessee Tech had a 44–30 record. He returned to Tennessee and was the Volunteers' golf coach from 1968 to 1976, compiling a 500–253–3 record. His Tennessee golf teams won 12 tournaments, and he also served as an assistant basketball coach at Tennessee from 1967 to 1970.

Hatfield died in Knoxville on January 25, 2003, at the age of 73.
