= 1951 NCAA baseball season =

Baseball season

College World Series
- Duration: June 13–17, 1951
- Champions: Oklahoma (1st title)
- Runners-up: Tennessee (1st CWS Appearance)
- Winning coach: Jack Baer (1st title)
- MOP: Sidney Hatfield (Tennessee)

Seasons
- ← 1950 1952 →

The 1951 NCAA baseball season, play of college baseball in the United States organized by the National Collegiate Athletic Association (NCAA) began in the spring of 1951. The season progressed through the regular season and concluded with the 1951 College World Series. The College World Series, held for the fifth time in 1951, consisted of one team from each of eight geographical districts and was held in Omaha, Nebraska at Johnny Rosenblatt Stadium as a double-elimination tournament. Oklahoma claimed the championship.

== Conference winners ==
This is a partial list of conference champions from the 1951 season. Each of the eight geographical districts chose, by various methods, the team that would represent them in the NCAA Tournament. Conference champions had to be chosen, unless all conference champions declined the bid.

Conference	Regular season winner	Conference tournament	Tournament city	Tournament winner
Big Seven	Oklahoma	No conference tournament		
Big Ten	Ohio State	No conference tournament		
CIBA	Southern California	No conference tournament		
EIBL	Princeton	No conference tournament		
Missouri Valley	Houston	1951 Missouri Valley Conference baseball tournament	Tulsa, OK	Houston
Pacific Coast Conference North	Oregon State	No conference tournament		
Southeastern Conference	Tennessee	No conference tournament		
Southern Conference	North - Maryland; South - Clemson	1951 Southern Conference baseball tournament	Greensboro, NC	Duke
Southwest Conference	Texas/Texas A&M	No conference tournament		
Yankee Conference	Connecticut	No conference tournament		

== Conference standings ==
The following is an incomplete list of conference standings:

1951 Big Seven Conference baseball standings
	Conf.				Overall
Team	W		L	PCT	W		L	PCT
Oklahoma ‍†‍‍^{y}	10	–	1	.909	19	–	9	.679
Missouri ‍‍‍	9	–	4	.692	12	–	6	.667
Nebraska ‍‍‍	5	–	4	.556	10	–	5	.667
Colorado ‍‍‍	3	–	5	.375		–		–
Kansas ‍‍‍	5	–	9	.357	6	–	9	.400
Kansas State ‍‍‍	5	–	10	.333	5	–	10	.333
Iowa State ‍‍‍	3	–	7	.300	8	–	7	.533
† – Conference champion y – Invited to the College World Series; As of June 30, 1951; Rankings from Collegiate Baseball

1951 Big Ten Conference baseball standings
	Conf.						Overall
Team	W		L		T	PCT	W		L		T	PCT
Ohio State ‍†‍‍^{y}	10	–	2	–	0	.833	23	–	15	–	0	.605
Illinois ‍‍‍	8	–	3	–	0	.727	16	–	9	–	0	.640
Indiana ‍‍‍	6	–	4	–	1	.591	16	–	10	–	1	.611
Minnesota ‍‍‍	6	–	6	–	0	.500	15	–	10	–	0	.600
Wisconsin ‍‍‍	5	–	5	–	1	.500	14	–	8	–	1	.630
Northwestern ‍‍‍	5	–	6	–	0	.455	11	–	9	–	0	.550
Michigan State ‍‍‍	4	–	6	–	0	.400	17	–	9	–	0	.654
Iowa ‍‍‍	4	–	8	–	0	.333	11	–	13	–	0	.458
Michigan ‍‍‍	4	–	8	–	0	.333	13	–	10	–	0	.565
Purdue ‍‍‍	2	–	9	–	0	.182	10	–	12	–	1	.457
† – Conference champion y – Invited to the College World Series; As of June 30, 1951; Rankings from Collegiate Baseball

1951 Eastern Intercollegiate Baseball League baseball standings
	Conf.						Overall
Team	W		L		T	PCT	W		L		T	PCT
Princeton ‍†‍‍^{y}	7	–	2	–	0	.778	20	–	6	–	0	.769
Brown ‍‍‍	6	–	2	–	0	.750	12	–	5	–	0	.706
Columbia ‍‍‍	6	–	3	–	0	.667	10	–	7	–	0	.588
Cornell ‍‍‍	5	–	3	–	0	.625	13	–	5	–	0	.722
Navy ‍‍‍	5	–	3	–	0	.625	10	–	11	–	0	.476
Penn ‍‍‍	4	–	5	–	0	.444	9	–	10	–	0	.474
Harvard ‍‍‍	3	–	5	–	0	.375	7	–	9	–	0	.438
Army ‍‍‍	3	–	6	–	0	.333	8	–	14	–	1	.370
Yale ‍‍‍	2	–	6	–	0	.250	16	–	14	–	0	.533
Dartmouth ‍‍‍	1	–	7	–	0	.125	4	–	22	–	1	.167
† – Conference champion y – Invited to the College World Series

1951 Missouri Valley Conference baseball standings
	Conf.				Overall
Team	W		L	PCT	W		L	PCT
East
Bradley ^{x}‍‍‍	5	–	2	.714	20	–	5	.800
Detroit ‍‍‍	2	–	3	.400	8	–	11	.421
Drake ‍‍‍	1	–	3	.250	7	–	7	.500
Saint Louis ‍‍‍	1	–	3	.250		–		–
West
Houston ^{x}‍‍‡‍	7	–	1	.875	16	–	9	.640
Tulsa ‍‍‍	4	–	2	.667	9	–	8	.529
Oklahoma A&M ‍‍‍	2	–	4	.333	9	–	8	.529
Wichita State ‍‍‍	1	–	5	.167	4	–	9	.308
x – Division champion ‡ – Tournament champion As of June 30, 1951

1951 Pacific Coast Conference baseball standings
	Conf.						Overall
Team	W		L		T	PCT	W		L		T	PCT
North Division
Oregon State ‍†‍‍	10	–	4	–	0	.714	23	–	6	–	0	.793
Washington State ‍‍‍	11	–	5	–	0	.688	30	–	11	–	0	.732
Washington ‍‍‍	10	–	6	–	0	.625	14	–	7	–	1	.659
Oregon ‍‍‍	7	–	9	–	0	.438	14	–	14	–	0	.500
Idaho ‍‍‍	0	–	14	–	0	.000	3	–	17	–	0	.150
California Intercollegiate Baseball Association
USC ‍†‍‍^{y}	11	–	5	–	0	.688	22	–	10	–	0	.688
UCLA ‍‍‍	10	–	6	–	0	.625	24	–	13	–	0	.649
Stanford ‍‍‍	9	–	9	–	0	.500	21	–	13	–	0	.618
California ‍‍‍	6	–	10	–	0	.375	22	–	16	–	0	.579
Santa Clara ‍‍‍	5	–	11	–	0	.313	0	–	0	–	0	–
† – Conference champion y – Invited to the NCAA Tournament

1951 Southeastern Conference baseball standings
	Conf.						Overall
Team	W		L		T	PCT	W		L		T	PCT
Tennessee ‍†‍‍^{y}	16	–	1	–	0	.941	20	–	3	–	0	.870
Alabama ‍‍‍	13	–	4	–	1	.750	17	–	5	–	1	.761
Ole Miss ‍‍‍	10	–	4	–	0	.714	15	–	4	–	0	.789
Florida ‍‍‍	9	–	7	–	0	.563	16	–	9	–	0	.640
LSU ‍‍‍	6	–	6	–	0	.500	10	–	6	–	0	.625
Auburn ‍‍‍	8	–	8	–	0	.500	14	–	11	–	0	.560
Tulane ‍‍‍	7	–	9	–	0	.438	10	–	11	–	0	.476
Mississippi State ‍‍‍	6	–	9	–	0	.400	11	–	9	–	0	.550
Georgia Tech ‍‍‍	8	–	12	–	0	.400	11	–	12	–	0	.478
Kentucky ‍‍‍	5	–	9	–	1	.367	8	–	10	–	1	.447
Georgia ‍‍‍	6	–	11	–	0	.353	12	–	13	–	0	.480
Vanderbilt ‍‍‍	0	–	13	–	1	.036	0	–	18	–	1	.026
x – Division champion y – Invited to the College World Series; As of June 18, 1951; Rankings from Coaches' Poll

1951 Southwest Conference baseball standings
	Conf.				Overall
Team	W		L	PCT	W		L	PCT
Texas A&M ‍†‍‍^{y}	11	–	4	.733	21	–	11	.656
Texas ‍‍‍	11	–	4	.733	17	–	6	.739
TCU ‍‍‍	8	–	7	.533	10	–	11	.476
SMU ‍‍‍	6	–	9	.400	10	–	12	.455
Baylor ‍‍‍	6	–	9	.400	10	–	10	.500
Rice ‍‍‍	3	–	12	.200	8	–	13	.381
† – Conference champion y – Invited to the College World Series; As of June 30, 1951; Rankings from Collegiate Baseball

== College World Series ==
The 1951 season marked the fifth NCAA Baseball Tournament, which consisted of the eight team College World Series. The College World Series was held in Omaha, Nebraska, which set a record for attendance of 27,789. Districts used a variety of selection methods to the event, from playoffs to a selection committee. District playoffs were not considered part of the NCAA Tournament, and the expansion to eight teams resulted in the end of regionals as they existed from 1947 through 1949. The eight teams played a double-elimination format, with Oklahoma claiming their first championship with a 3–2 win over Tennessee in the final.

Upper round 1	Upper round 2	Upper final	Final
USC	4
Princeton	1
USC	8
Utah	2
Utah	7
Tennessee	1
USC	1
Oklahoma	4
Oklahoma	9^{10}
Ohio State	8
Oklahoma	7
Springfield	1
Springfield	5
Texas A&M	1	Oklahoma	3
Tennessee	2
Lower round 1	Lower round 2	Lower round 3	Lower final
Tennessee	2
Princeton	2	Springfield	0	Tennessee	9
Tennessee	3	Tennessee	5	USC	8
Utah	4
Texas A&M	8
Ohio State	2	Utah	15
Texas A&M	3
