= 1970 NCAA University Division baseball rankings =

1970 NCAA University Division baseball season

Tournament

College World Series
- Champions: USC
- Runners-up: Florida State
- MOP: Gene Ammann (Florida State)

Seasons
- ← 1969 1971 →

The following poll makes up the 1970 NCAA University Division baseball rankings. Collegiate Baseball Newspaper published its first human poll of the top 20 teams in college baseball in 1957, and expanded to rank the top 30 teams in 1961.

== Collegiate Baseball ==
Currently, only the final poll from the 1970 season is available.

Rank	Team
1	USC
2	Florida State
3	Texas
4	Ohio
5	Dartmouth
6	Iowa State
7	Arizona
8	Delaware
9	Ohio State
10	Mississippi State
11	Southern Illinois
12	Minnesota
13	Washington State
14	Santa Clara
15	Texas–Pan American
16	Maryland
17	Tennessee
18	Clemson
19	Tulsa
20	Jacksonville
21	Connecticut
22	Notre Dame
23	Long Beach State
24	Arkansas State
25	East Carolina
26	Denver
27	BYU
28	Providence
29	Maine
30	Penn State
