= 1970 Florida State Seminoles baseball team =

American college baseball season

1970 Florida State Seminoles baseball
- Conference: Independent
- Record: 49–9–1
- Head coach: Jack Stallings (2nd season)
- Assistant coaches: Bob Smith (1st season); Roy Mewbourne (1st season)
- Home stadium: Seminole Field

The 1970 Florida State Seminole baseball team represented Florida State University in the 1970 NCAA University Division baseball season. The Seminoles played their home games at Seminole Field. The team was coached by Jack Stallings in his 2nd season at Florida State.

The Seminoles lost the College World Series, defeated by the USC Trojans in the championship game.

== Roster ==
1970 Florida State Seminoles roster
Pitchers: 15 Gene Ammann - Junior; 19 Al Cleveland - Senior; 5 John Ferguson - Senior; 7 Robin Flake - Junior; 16 Carl Gromek - Senior; 18 Don Harbaugh - Junior; 23 Tom Henson - Junior; 27 Pat Osburn - Junior; 22 Mac Scarce - Junior; 11 Mark Slade - Junior	Infielders: 12 Ron Cash - Junior; 9 David Grimes - Junior; 5 Greg Gromek - Junior; 28 Doug Kasimier - Junior; 3 Dick Nichols - Senior; 2 Tom Porter - Senior; 21 James Scheller - Sophomore; Catchers: 24 John Keith - Junior; 17 Dan Roatche - Sophomore; 13 Harry Saferight - Junior; 14 Greg Zera - Junior	Outfielders: 6 Larry Cocks - Junior; 20 Johnny Grubb - Junior; 4 Rick Moss - Junior; 10 Greg Schnute - Senior; 8 Mike Vasquez - Junior; Coaches: 1 Jack Stallings - 2nd Season; 25 Roy Mewbourne - 1st Season; 26 Bob Smith - 1st Season

== Schedule ==
1970 Florida State Seminoles baseball game log
Regular season
March (16–1)

Date	Opponent	Site/stadium	Score	Overall record
March 4	Union (TN)	Seminole Field	5–1	1–0
March 4	Union (TN)	Seminole Field	6–2	2–0
March 13	Saint Leo	Seminole Field	6–1	3–0
March 14	Saint Leo	Seminole Field	5–4	4–0
March 20	at Florida Southern	Henley Field	1–0	5–0
March 21	at Miami (FL)	Miami Field	10–1	6–0
March 22	vs Michigan State	Miami Field	5–6	6–1
March 22	at Miami	Miami Field	8–3	7–1
March 24	at Stetson	Conrad Park	1–0	8–1
March 25	Bowling Green	Seminole Field	17–8	9–1
March 25	NYU	Seminole Field	6–1	10–1
March 26	Rider	Seminole Field	8–1	11–1
March 27	NYU	Seminole Field	4–2	12–1
March 27	Southern Illinois	Seminole Field	6–1	13–1
March 30	North Carolina	Seminole Field	15–6	14–1
March 30	North Carolina	Seminole Field	5–4	15–1
March 31	North Carolina	Seminole Field	3–2	16–1

April (15–2–1)

Date	Opponent	Site/stadium	Score	Overall record
April 1	Illinois	Seminole Field	5–4	17–1
April 2	Maryland	Seminole Field	6–2	18–1
April 2	Holy Cross	Seminole Field	11–4	19–1
April 3	Illinois	Seminole Field	10–0	20–1
April 4	Holy Cross	Seminole Field	3–0	21–1
April 4	Maryland	Seminole Field	4–3	22–1
April 6	Auburn	Seminole Field	10–4	23–1
April 7	Auburn	Seminole Field	3–5	23–2
April 10	at South Alabama	Unknown	4–8	24–2
April 11	at South Alabama	Unknown	4–0	25–2
April 11	at South Alabama	Unknown	11–0	26–2
April 17	at South Florida	Red McEwen Field	7–0	27–2
April 18	at South Florida	Red McEwen Field	8–0	28–2
April 19	at Saint Leo	Dade City Park	8–3	29–2
April 23	Florida Southern	Seminole Field	7–6	30–2
April 24	South Alabama	Seminole Field	9–0	31–2
April 25	South Alabama	Seminole Field	3–5	31–3
April 25	South Alabama	Seminole Field	2–2	31–3–1

May (11–4)

Date	Opponent	Site/stadium	Score	Overall record
May 1	Georgia Southern	Seminole Field	12–5	32–3–1
May 2	Georgia Southern	Seminole Field	8–4	33–3–1
May 4	Jacksonville	Seminole Field	4–1	34–3–1
May 5	Jacksonville	Seminole Field	2–8	35–3–1
May 8	Miami (FL)	Seminole Field	11–4	36–3–1
May 9	Miami (FL)	Seminole Field	6–2	37–3–1
May 11	at Florida	Perry Field	1–3	37–4–1
May 12	at Florida	Perry Field	4–5	37–5–1
May 15	at Georgia Southern	Unknown	8–3	38–5–1
May 16	at Georgia Southern	Unknown	1–2	38–6–1
May 18	at Auburn	Plainsman Park	5–0	39–6–1
May 19	at Auburn	Plainsman Park	7–6	40–6–1
May 22	Florida	Seminole Field	3–4	40–7–1
May 23	Florida	Seminole Field	1–0	41–7–1
May 23	Florida	Seminole Field	9–4	42–7–1

Postseason
District 3 Regional (3–0)

Opponent	Site/stadium	Score	Overall record
vs East Carolina	Sims Legion Park	2–0	43–7–1
vs Maryland	Sims Legion Park	10–1	44–7–1
vs Mississippi State	Sims Legion Park	5–4	45–7–1

1970 College World Series (4–2)

Opponent	Site/stadium	Score	Overall record
vs Arizona	Rosenblatt Stadium	4–0	46–7–1
vs Dartmouth	Rosenblatt Stadium	6–0	47–7–1
vs Texas	Rosenblatt Stadium	1–5	47–8–1
vs Ohio	Rosenblatt Stadium	2–0	48–8–1
vs Texas	Rosenblatt Stadium	11–2	49–8–1
vs USC	Rosenblatt Stadium	1–2	49–9–1

== Awards and honors ==
Dick Nichols

- Second Team All-American
- Sporting News First Team All-American

Johnny Grubb

- Sporting News Honorable Mention All-American
- All-Tournament Team

Ron Cash

- Sporting News Honorable Mention All-American

Pat Osborn

- Sporting News Honorable Mention All-American

Gene Ammann

- All-Tournament Team

== Seminoles in the 1970 MLB draft ==
The following members of the Florida State Seminoles baseball program were drafted in the 1970 Major League Baseball draft.

Round	Pick	Player	Position	MLB Club
26	621	Dick Nichols	2B	Boston Red Sox
