= 1970 NCAA University Division baseball tournament =

American college sports championship

- Season: 1970
- Teams: 26
- Finals site: Johnny Rosenblatt Stadium; Omaha, NE
- Champions: Southern California (6th title)
- Runner-up: Florida State (4th CWS Appearance)
- Winning coach: Rod Dedeaux (6th title)
- MOP: Gene Ammann (Florida State)

The 1970 NCAA University Division baseball tournament was played at the end of the 1970 NCAA University Division baseball season to determine the national champion of college baseball. The tournament concluded with eight teams competing in the College World Series, a double-elimination tournament in its twenty-fourth year. Eight regional districts sent representatives to the College World Series with preliminary rounds within each district serving to determine each representative. These events would later become known as regionals. Each district had its own format for selecting teams, resulting in 26 teams participating in the tournament at the conclusion of their regular season, and in some cases, after a conference tournament. The twenty-fourth tournament's champion was the Southern California, coached by Rod Dedeaux. The Most Outstanding Player was Gene Ammann of Florida State.

== Tournament ==
The opening rounds of the tournament were played across eight district sites across the country, each consisting of between two and four teams. The winners of each District advanced to the College World Series.

Bold indicates winner.

=== District 1 at Hanover, NH ===
Semifinals
**Dartmouth**	**7**
Providence	2
**Connecticut**	**8**
Providence	0

Finals
**Dartmouth**	**8**	**12**	—
Connecticut	2	3	—

=== District 2 at Princeton, NJ ===
Quarterfinals
**Delaware**	**7**
Penn State	1
**Seton Hall**	**3**
Rutgers	0
Lower round 1
**Penn State**	**5**
Rutgers	1

Semifinals
**Delaware**	**5**
Seton Hall	1
Lower final
**Seton Hall**	**1**
Penn State	0

Final
**Delaware**	**4**	—
Seton Hall	0	—

=== District 3 at Gastonia, NC ===
Quarterfinals
**Florida State**	**2**
East Carolina	0
**Maryland**	**3**
Mississippi State	2
Lower round 1
East Carolina	6
**Mississippi State**	**12**

Semifinals
**Florida State**	**10**
Maryland	1
Lower final
Maryland	4
**Mississippi State**	**8**

Final
**Florida State**	**5**	—
Mississippi State	4	—

=== District 4 at Columbus, OH ===
Quarterfinals
Minnesota	4*
**Ohio**	**6***
**Southern Illinois**	**10**
Notre Dame	2
Lower round 1
Minnesota	1
**Notre Dame**	**6**

Semifinals
**Ohio**	**7**
Southern Illinois	0
Lower final
Notre Dame	0
**Southern Illinois**	**1**

Final
**Ohio**	**8**	—
Southern Illinois	5	—

=== District 5 at Ames, IA ===
Finals
Tulsa	6*	0	—
**Iowa State**	**7***	**4**	—

=== District 6 at Austin, TX ===
Semifinals
**Texas–Pan American**	**5**
Arkansas State	0
**Texas**	**5**
Arkansas State	0

Finals
Texas-Pan American	1	3*	—
**Texas**	**2**	**4***	—

=== District 7 at Denver, CO & Tucson, AZ ===
Denver, CO				Tucson, AZ
				**Arizona**	**4**	7*	**9**
**Denver**	**1**	**13**	—	Denver	2	**9***	8
Weber State	0	4	—

=== District 8 at Los Angeles ===
Semifinal				Final
				**Southern California**	**12**	**6**	—
**Santa Clara**	**4**	**12**	—	Santa Clara	1	1	—
Long Beach State	3	4	—

== College World Series ==
=== Participants ===
School	Conference	Record (conference)	Head coach	CWS appearances	CWS best finish	CWS record
Arizona	WAC	44–16 (11–7)	Frank Sancet	8 (last: 1966)	2nd (1956, 1958, 1960)	17–16
Dartmouth	EIBL	23–8 (11–2)	Tony Lupien	0 (last: none)	none	0–0
Delaware	Middle Atlantic	22–4 (9–1)	Bob Hannah	0 (last: none)	none	0–0
Florida State	n/a	45–7–1 (n/a)	Jack Stallings	4 (last: 1965)	4th (1962)	4–8
Iowa State	Big 8	18–9 (13–5)	Cap Timm	1 (last: 1957)	3rd (1957)	2–2
Ohio	MAC	31–4 (14–1)	Bob Wren	0 (last: none)	none	0–0
Southern California	Pac-8	41–12 (11–3)	Rod Dedeaux	11 (last: 1968)	1st (1948, 1958, 1961, 1963, 1968)	34–15
Texas	SWC	36–6 (14–1)	Cliff Gustafson	12 (last: 1969)	1st (1949, 1950)	23–21

=== Results ===
==== Bracket ====
Upper round 1
Texas	12
Delaware	4
Ohio	4
Southern California	1
Florida State	4
Arizona	0
Dartmouth	7
Iowa State	6

Upper round 2
Texas	7
Ohio	2
Florida State	6
Dartmouth	0
Lower round 1
Delaware	1
Southern California	7
Arizona	1
Iowa State	7

Upper final
Texas	5
Florida State	1
Lower round 2
Dartmouth	1
Southern California	6
Ohio	9
Iowa State	6

Semifinals
Texas	7
Southern California	8^{14}
Florida State	2
Ohio	0

Preliminary final
Texas	2
Florida State	11

Final
Southern California	2^{15}
Florida State	1

==== Game results ====
Date	Game	Winner	Score	Loser	Notes
June 12	Game 1	Texas	12–4	Delaware	
June 12	Game 2	Ohio	4–1	Southern California	
June 13	Game 3	Florida State	4–0	Arizona	
June 13	Game 4	Dartmouth	7–6	Iowa State	
June 13	Game 5	Southern California	7–1	Delaware	Delaware eliminated
June 14	Game 6	Iowa State	7–1	Arizona	Arizona eliminated
June 14	Game 7	Texas	7–2	Ohio	
June 14	Game 8	Florida State	6–0	Dartmouth	
June 15	Game 9	Ohio	9–6	Iowa State	Iowa State eliminated
June 15	Game 10	Southern California	6–1	Dartmouth	Dartmouth eliminated
June 15	Game 11	Texas	5–1	Florida State	
June 16	Game 12	Florida State	2–0	Ohio	Ohio eliminated
June 16	Game 13	Southern California	8–7 (14 innings)	Texas	
June 17	Game 14	Florida State	11–2	Texas	Texas eliminated
June 18	Final	Southern California	2–1 (15 innings)	Florida State	Southern California wins CWS

=== All-Tournament Team ===
The following players were members of the All-Tournament Team.

Position	Player	School
P	Gene Ammann (MOP)	Florida State
P	Jim Barr	USC
C	Tommy Harmon	Texas
1B	John Langerhans	Texas
2B	Frank Alfano	USC
3B	Dan Stoligrosz	USC
SS	Jerry Lundin	Iowa State
OF	John Grubb	Florida State
OF	Mike Markl	Texas
OF	Gary Shade	Ohio

=== Notable players ===
- Arizona: Leon Hooten
- Dartmouth: Pete Broberg, Chuck Seelbach
- Delaware:
- Florida State: Ron Cash, Johnny Grubb, Pat Osburn, Mac Scarce, Stan Thomas
- Iowa State:
- Ohio: Mike Schmidt, Steve Swisher
- Southern California: Jim Barr, Steve Busby, Dave Kingman, Eric Raich, Brent Strom, John Vella
- Texas: Mike Beard, Dave Chalk, Larry Hardy, Burt Hooton

== See also ==
- 1970 NCAA College Division baseball tournament
- 1970 NAIA World Series
