= 1970 Iowa State Cyclones baseball team =

American college baseball season

1970 Iowa State Cyclones baseball

District V Playoff Big Eight Champions

College World Series, 3rd
- Conference: Big Eight Conference
- Record: 19–11 (13–5 Big 8)
- Head coach: Cap Timm (29th season)
- Assistant coach: Clair Rierson

1970 Big Eight Conference baseball standings
	Conf.				Overall
Team	W		L	PCT	W		L	PCT
No. 6 Iowa State ‍†‍‍^{y}	13	–	5	.722	19	–	11	.633
Kansas ‍‍‍	10	–	7	.588	15	–	8	.652
Nebraska ‍‍‍	11	–	8	.579	15	–	11	.577
Oklahoma ‍‍‍	10	–	9	.526	20	–	17	.541
Missouri ‍‍‍	8	–	9	.471	12	–	13	.480
Kansas State ‍‍‍	8	–	10	.444	13	–	16	.448
Colorado ‍‍‍	6	–	12	.333	14	–	16	.467
Oklahoma State ‍‍‍	5	–	11	.313	12	–	16	.429
† – Conference champion y – Invited to the NCAA tournament As of June 30, 1970; Rankings from Collegiate Baseball

The 1970 Iowa State Cyclones baseball team represented Iowa State University in the 1970 NCAA University Division baseball season. The Cyclones played their home games at Cap Timm Field. The team was coached by Cap Timm in his 29th year as head coach at Iowa State.

The Cyclones won the District V playoff to advance to the College World Series, where they were defeated by the Ohio Bobcats.

== Roster ==
1970 Iowa State Cyclones baseball team
Players
Coaches

#	Pos.	Name	B/T	Height	Weight	Year	Home town
		Larry Corrigan	L/R	—	—	So
	LHP	Mike Gillespie	/L	—	—	So
	INF	Jerry Lundin	L/	—	—	Jr
	LHP	Don Powers	/L	—	—	Fr

Head coach

Cap Timm

Assistant coach(es)

Clair Rierson

Legend

- (C) Team captain
- (S) Suspended
- (I) Ineligible
- Injured
- Current redshirt

== Schedule ==
1970 Iowa State Cyclones baseball game log
Regular season
April (9–5)

#	Date	Opponent	Site/stadium	Score	Overall record	Big 8 record
1	April 3	vs Minnesota	Cap Timm Field • Ames, Iowa	2–1	1–0	–
2	April 3	vs Minnesota	Cap Timm Field • Ames, Iowa	0–5	1–1	–
3	April 4	vs Minnesota	Cap Timm Field • Ames, Iowa	0–9	1–2	–
4	April 4	vs Minnesota	Cap Timm Field • Ames, Iowa	0–5	1–3	–
5	April	vs Iowa	Unknown • Unknown	0–1	1–4	–
6	April	at Missouri	Simmons Field • Columbia, Missouri	1–0	2–4	1–0
7	April	at Missouri	Simmons Field • Columbia, Missouri	5–1	3–4	2–0
8	April	at Missouri	Simmons Field • Columbia, Missouri	16–9	4–4	3–0
9	April	vs Colorado	Unknown • Unknown	6–5	5–4	4–0
10	April	vs Drake	Unknown • Unknown	13–2	6–4	4–0
11	April 24	at Oklahoma	Unknown • Norman, Oklahoma	8–2	7–4	5–0
12	April 24	at Oklahoma	Unknown • Norman, Oklahoma	6–5	8–4	6–0
13	April 25	at Oklahoma	Unknown • Norman, Oklahoma	3–7	8–5	6–1
14	April 28	vs Northern Iowa	Cap Timm Field • Ames, Iowa	2–1	9–5	6–1

May (7–4)

#	Date	Opponent	Site/stadium	Score	Overall record	Big 8 record
15	May 2	Kansas State	Cap Timm Field • Ames, Iowa	6–3	10–5	7–1
16	May 2	Kansas State	Cap Timm Field • Ames, Iowa	7–5	11–5	8–1
17	May 8	Oklahoma State	Cap Timm Field • Ames, Iowa	2–1	12–5	9–1
18	May 9	Oklahoma State	Cap Timm Field • Ames, Iowa	3–5	12–6	9–2
19	May 9	Oklahoma State	Cap Timm Field • Ames, Iowa	4–0	13–6	10–2
20	May 15	at Kansas	Hoglund Ballpark • Lawrence, Kansas	3–1	14–6	11–2
21	May 15	at Kansas	Hoglund Ballpark • Lawrence, Kansas	2–3	14–7	11–3
22	May 16	at Kansas	Hoglund Ballpark • Lawrence, Kansas	1–2	14–8	11–4
23	May 20	Nebraska	Cap Timm Field • Ames, Iowa	4–1	15–8	12–4
24	May 20	Nebraska	Cap Timm Field • Ames, Iowa	0–2	15–9	12–5
25	May 21	Nebraska	Cap Timm Field • Ames, Iowa	9–3	16–9	13–5

Postseason
NCAA District V Playoff (2–0)

#	Date	Opponent	Site/stadium	Score	Overall record	Big 8 record
26	May 31	Tulsa	Cap Timm Field • Ames, Iowa	7–6	17–9	13–5
27	June 1	Tulsa	Cap Timm Field • Ames, Iowa	4–0	18–9	13–5

College World Series (1–2)

#	Date	Opponent	Site/stadium	Score	Overall record	Big 8 record
28	June 13	vs Dartmouth	Johnny Rosenblatt Stadium • Omaha, Nebraska	6–7	18–10	13–5
29	June 14	vs Arizona	Johnny Rosenblatt Stadium • Omaha, Nebraska	7–1	19–10	13–5
30	June 15	vs Ohio	Johnny Rosenblatt Stadium • Omaha, Nebraska	6–9	19–11	13–5

== Awards and honors ==
Jerry Lundin

- All-Tournament Team
