= 1970 Arizona Wildcats baseball team =

American college baseball season

1970 Arizona Wildcats baseball

WAC champions WAC Championship Series champions District VI champions

College World Series, T-7th
- Conference: Western Athletic Conference
- South Division

Ranking
- Coaches: No. 7
- CB: No. 7
- Record: 44–18 (11–7 WAC)
- Head coach: Frank Sancet (21st season)
- Pitching coach: Don Lee
- Home stadium: Wildcat Field

1970 Western Athletic Conference baseball standings
	Conf.				Overall
Team	W		L	PCT	W		L	PCT
Northern
No. 27 BYU ‍‍‍	14	–	3	.824	31	–	14	.689
Wyoming ‍‍‍	12	–	6	.667	19	–	14	.576
Utah ‍‍‍	3	–	10	.231	20	–	18	.526
Colorado State ‍‍‍	2	–	12	.143	9	–	18	.333
Southern
No. 7 Arizona ‍‍‍^{y}	11	–	7	.611	44	–	18	.710
Arizona State ‍‍‍	9	–	9	.500	30	–	22	.577
New Mexico ‍‍‍	9	–	9	.500	27	–	18	.600
UTEP ‍‍‍	7	–	11	.389	26	–	23	.531
† – Conference champion y – Invited to the NCAA tournament As of June 30, 1970; Rankings from Collegiate Baseball

The 1970 Arizona Wildcats baseball team represented the University of Arizona in the 1970 NCAA University Division baseball season. The Wildcats played their home games at UA Field. The team was coached by Frank Sancet in his 21st year at Arizona.

The Wildcats won the District VI Playoff to advance to the College World Series, where they were defeated by the Iowa State Cyclones.

== Roster ==
1970 Arizona Wildcats baseball team
Players
Coaches

#	Pos.	Name	B/T	Height	Weight	Year	Home town
		Pat Anderson	/	—	—
	INF	Steven Ballard	/	—	—	Sr
		Dale Bauman	/	—	—
		Darrin Berger	/	—	—
		Frank Campos	/	—	—
		Lee Cole	/	—	—
	P	Larry Dierks	/	—	—
		Mark Driscoll	/	—	—
		Nick Estrada	/	—	—
		Fon Formiller	/	—	—
		John Glenn	/	—	—
	P	Mike Gray	/	—	—
		Mike Grossman	/	—	—
		Tim Gump	/	—	—
		Jim Hamlett	/	—	—
	RHP	Leon Hooten	/	—	—
		Dave Jacome	/	—	—
		Harry Ladge	/	—	—
	OF	Steve Milkulic	/	—	—
		Rick Morache	/	—	—
	INF	Rod O'Brien	/	—	—
		Mickey O'Hara	/	—	—
	OF	Dave Prest	/	—	—
		Jim Provenzano	/	—	—
		Mark Reutter	/	—	—
		Keith Rhodes	/	—	—
	C	J. Ray Rokey	/	—	—
28	RHP	Bryan Shields	/R	—	—
	INF	Jim Williams	/	—	—

Head coach

45 Frank Sancet

Assistant coach(es)

Pitching coach(es)

Don Lee

Legend

- (C) Team captain
- (S) Suspended
- (I) Ineligible
- Injured
- Current redshirt

== Schedule ==
1970 Arizona Wildcats baseball game log
Regular season
February (3–0)

#	Date	Opponent	Site/stadium	Score	Overall record	WAC record
1	February 27	Cal Poly Pomona	Wildcat Field • Tucson, Arizona	5–1	1–0	–
2	February 28	Cal Poly Pomona	Wildcat Field • Tucson, Arizona	5–4	2–0	–
3	February 28	Cal Poly Pomona	Wildcat Field • Tucson, Arizona	4–2	3–0	–

March (19–7)

#	Date	Opponent	Site/stadium	Score	Overall record	WAC record
4	March 2	San Diego State	Wildcat Field • Tucson, Arizona	5–8	3–1	–
5	March 3	San Diego State	Wildcat Field • Tucson, Arizona	3–2	4–1	–
6	March 9	Cal State Northridge	Wildcat Field • Tucson, Arizona	5–4	5–1	–
7	March 10	Cal State Northridge	Wildcat Field • Tucson, Arizona	1–2	5–2	–
8	March 11	TCU	Wildcat Field • Tucson, Arizona	3–4	5–3	–
9	March 12	TCU	Wildcat Field • Tucson, Arizona	7–6	6–3	–
10	March 13	TCU	Wildcat Field • Tucson, Arizona	9–6	7–3	–
11	March 14	TCU	Wildcat Field • Tucson, Arizona	5–2	8–3	–
12	March 14	TCU	Wildcat Field • Tucson, Arizona	4–3	9–3	–
13	March 16	Weber State	Wildcat Field • Tucson, Arizona	25–6	10–3	–
14	March 17	Weber State	Wildcat Field • Tucson, Arizona	10–7	11–3	–
15	March 18	Weber State	Wildcat Field • Tucson, Arizona	1–4	11–4	–
16	March 18	Weber State	Wildcat Field • Tucson, Arizona	25–3	12–4	–
17	March 20	Michigan	Wildcat Field • Tucson, Arizona	6–5	13–4	–
18	March 21	Michigan	Wildcat Field • Tucson, Arizona	5–1	14–4	–
19	March 21	Michigan	Wildcat Field • Tucson, Arizona	8–7	15–4	–
20	March 23	Michigan	Wildcat Field • Tucson, Arizona	10–2	16–4	–
21	March 23	Michigan	Wildcat Field • Tucson, Arizona	4–12	16–5	–
22	March 24	Michigan	Wildcat Field • Tucson, Arizona	16–7	17–5	–
23	March 25	Michigan	Wildcat Field • Tucson, Arizona	5–9	17–6	–
24	March 26	Michigan	Wildcat Field • Tucson, Arizona	11–5	18–6	–
25	March 28	Iowa	Wildcat Field • Tucson, Arizona	20–7	19–6	–
26	March 28	Iowa	Wildcat Field • Tucson, Arizona	4–8	19–7	–
27	March 30	Iowa	Wildcat Field • Tucson, Arizona	11–5	20–7	–
28	March 31	Tulsa	Wildcat Field • Tucson, Arizona	11–1	21–7	–

April (12–4)

#	Date	Opponent	Site/stadium	Score	Overall record	WAC record
29	April 1	Iowa	Wildcat Field • Tucson, Arizona	5–2	22–7	–
30	April 2	Iowa	Wildcat Field • Tucson, Arizona	6–2	23–7	–
31	April 3	Iowa	Wildcat Field • Tucson, Arizona	7–6	24–7	–
32	April 4	Iowa	Wildcat Field • Tucson, Arizona	5–1	25–7	–
33	April 4	Iowa	Wildcat Field • Tucson, Arizona	15–4	26–7	–
34	April 10	at UTEP	Unknown • El Paso, Texas	5–3	27–7	1–0
35	April 11	at UTEP	UA Field • Tucson, Arizona	6–5	28–7	2–0
36	April 11	at UTEP	UA Field • Tucson, Arizona	7–8	28–8	2–1
37	April 14	Northern Arizona	Wildcat Field • Tucson, Arizona	9–8	29–8	2–1
38	April 17	New Mexico	Wildcat Field • Tucson, Arizona	0–1	29–9	2–2
39	April 18	New Mexico	Wildcat Field • Tucson, Arizona	3–8	29–10	2–3
40	April 18	New Mexico	Wildcat Field • Tucson, Arizona	2–3	29–11	2–4
41	April 24	UTEP	Wildcat Field • Tucson, Arizona	12–5	30–11	3–4
42	April 25	UTEP	Wildcat Field • Tucson, Arizona	6–0	31–11	4–4
43	April 25	UTEP	Wildcat Field • Tucson, Arizona	5–2	32–11	5–4
44	April 28	Grand Canyon	Wildcat Field • Tucson, Arizona	7–6	33–11	5–4

May (7–3)

#	Date	Opponent	Site/stadium	Score	Overall record	WAC record
45	May 1	at Arizona State	Phoenix Municipal Stadium • Phoenix, Arizona	3–2	34–11	6–4
46	May 2	at Arizona State	Phoenix Municipal Stadium • Phoenix, Arizona	6–4	35–11	7–4
47	May 2	at Arizona State	Phoenix Municipal Stadium • Phoenix, Arizona	12–13	35–12	7–5
48	May 5	Grand Canyon	Wildcat Field • Tucson, Arizona	8–7	36–12	7–5
49	May 8	at New Mexico	Lobo Field • Albuquerque, New Mexico	6–12	36–13	7–6
50	May 9	at New Mexico	Lobo Field • Albuquerque, New Mexico	6–8	36–14	7–7
51	May 9	at New Mexico	Lobo Field • Albuquerque, New Mexico	6–3	37–14	8–7
52	May 15	Arizona State	Wildcat Field • Tucson, Arizona	7–3	38–14	9–7
53	May 16	Arizona State	Wildcat Field • Tucson, Arizona	4–0	39–14	10–7
54	May 16	Arizona State	Wildcat Field • Tucson, Arizona	9–3	40–14	11–7

Postseason
WAC Championship Series (2–1)

#	Date	Opponent	Site/stadium	Score	Overall record	WAC record
55	May 22	at BYU	New Cougar Field • Provo, Utah	10–5	41–14	11–7
56	May 23	at BYU	New Cougar Field • Provo, Utah	8–18	41–15	11–7
57	May 23	at BYU	New Cougar Field • Provo, Utah	10–8	42–15	11–7

NCAA District VII Playoff (2–1)

#	Date	Opponent	Site/stadium	Score	Overall record	WAC record
58	May 28	Denver	Wildcats Field • Tucson, Arizona	4–2	43–15	11–7
59	May 29	Denver	Wildcat Field • Tucson, Arizona	7–9	43–16	11–7
60	May 30	Denver	Wildcat Field • Tucson, Arizona	9–8	44–16	11–7

College World Series (0–2)

#	Date	Opponent	Site/stadium	Score	Overall record	WAC record
61	June 13	vs Florida State	Johnny Rosenblatt Stadium • Omaha, Nebraska	0–4	44–17	11–7
62	June 14	vs Iowa State	Johnny Rosenblatt Stadium • Omaha, Nebraska	1–7	44–18	11–7

== Awards and honors ==
Leon Hooten

- All-WAC South Division

Steve Mikulic

- All-WAC South Division
- First Team All-American American Baseball Coaches Association

Rod O'Brien

- All-WAC South Division

Dave Prest

- All-WAC South Division

J. Ray Rokey

- All-WAC South Division
- Third Team All-American American Baseball Coaches Association
