= Jack Stallings =

American baseball coach (1931–2018)

Biographical details
- Born: April 8, 1931; Durham, North Carolina, U.S.
- Died: June 19, 2018 (aged 87); Tallahassee, Florida, U.S.

Playing career
- 1951–1952: Wake Forest
- 1953: Roanoke Ro-Sox
- 1953–1954: Greensboro Patriots
- 1954: Bluefield Blue–Grays
- Position: Second baseman

Coaching career (HC unless noted)
- 1955: Wake Forest (asst.)
- 1956–1957: North Carolina (asst.)
- 1958–1959: Winston-Salem (NC) Hanes H.S.
- 1960–1968: Wake Forest
- 1969–1974: Florida State
- 1976–1999: Georgia Southern

Head coaching record
- Overall: 1,259–799–10 (.611)
Medal record
Men's baseball
Representing United States
Pan American Games
Silver medal – second place	1951 Buenos Aires	Team
Manager for United States
Amateur World Series
Gold medal – first place	1973 Central America	Team
Silver medal – second place	1970 Cartagena	Team

Jack Thomas Stallings (April 8, 1931 – June 19, 2018) was an American college baseball head coach. He was the head coach of Wake Forest University, Florida State University, and Georgia Southern University. He also helped manage the United States national baseball team in 1970 and 1973 and was an administrator for the 1984 US Olympic Team and the 1988 US Olympic Team. With over 1,200 games won as a head coach, he ranks 28th all-time with the most wins by any Division I coach, with his 859–582–5 tenure at Georgia Southern being a record for most wins and games coached. His #1 jersey is retired by the program.

At Georgia Southern, he was named the TAAC Coach of the Year four times and Southern Conference Baseball Coach of the Year twice.

He died on June 19, 2018, at the age of 87.

== Head coaching record ==
Record table
Season	Team	Overall	Conference	Standing	Postseason
Wake Forest Demon Deacons (Atlantic Coast Conference) (1960–1968)
1960	Wake Forest	14–7	7–7	5th	
1961	Wake Forest	23–7	9–5	3rd	
1962	Wake Forest	20–11	10–5	1st	District 3 Finals
1963	Wake Forest	28–11	11–3	1st	District 3 Finals
1964	Wake Forest	23–7	9–4	2nd	
1965	Wake Forest	14–15	7–7	3rd	
1966	Wake Forest	12–12	7–7	3rd	
1967	Wake Forest	8–15–1	4–8–1	7th	
1968	Wake Forest	10–24–1	5–15–1	8th	
Wake Forest:		152–109–2			
Florida State Seminoles (Independent) (1969–1974)
1969	Florida State	38–13–1			
1970	Florida State	49–9–1			College World Series
1971	Florida State	41–17			
1972	Florida State	45–23			District 3 playoffs
1973	Florida State	38–21			
1974	Florida State	37–25–1			
Florida State:		248–108–3			
Georgia Southern Eagles (Independent) (1976–1979)
1976	Georgia Southern	36–18			
1977	Georgia Southern	38–25–1			
1978	Georgia Southern	35–15			
1979	Georgia Southern	46–15			Atlantic Regional semifinals
Georgia Southern Eagles (Trans-American / Trans-Atlantic Conference) (1980–1991)
1980	Georgia Southern	38–21–1			Atlantic Regional first round
1981	Georgia Southern	41–22–1	9–0	1st (East)	
1982	Georgia Southern	34–33	5–5	2nd (East)	
1983	Georgia Southern	38–24	(Note: No records for conferences games in 1983 exist, although they played a conference tournament)		
1984	Georgia Southern	32–37	13–4	1st (East)	
1985	Georgia Southern	41–23	14–3	1st (East)	
1986	Georgia Southern	36–23–1	12–6	1st (East)	
1987	Georgia Southern	33–30–1	13–5	1st (East)	Atlantic Regional
1988	Georgia Southern	30–27	13–4	1st (East)	
1989	Georgia Southern	33–27	12–6	2nd (East)	
1990	Georgia Southern	50–19	17–1	1st (East)	College World Series
1991	Georgia Southern	32–27	10–8	3rd (East)	
Georgia Southern Eagles (Southern Conference) (1992–1999)
1992	Georgia Southern	31–27	15–6	3rd	
1993	Georgia Southern	38–21	18–5	1st	
1994	Georgia Southern	31–25	15–7	2nd	
1995	Georgia Southern	35–24	14–10	2nd	
1996	Georgia Southern	46–14	17–3	1st	Atlantic Regional
1997	Georgia Southern	34–26	18–6	T–1st	
1998	Georgia Southern	22–30	9–15	6th	
1999	Georgia Southern	29–29	13–15	6th	
Georgia Southern:		859–582–5			
Total:		1259–799–10			
National champion Postseason invitational champion Conference regular season champion Conference regular season and conference tournament champion Division regular season champion Division regular season and conference tournament champion Conference tournament champion

== Awards ==
- American Baseball Coaches Association Hall of Fame

== See also ==
- List of college baseball career coaching wins leaders
