= Cap Timm =

American baseball coach

Biographical details
- Born: June 4, 1908; Arlington, Minnesota, U.S.
- Died: August 7, 1987 (aged 79); Ames, Iowa, U.S.
- Education: University of Minnesota

Playing career

Football
- 1928–1931: Minnesota

Baseball
- 1929–1931: Minnesota
- Positions: Quarterback, Catcher

Coaching career (HC unless noted)

Football
- 1934–1955: Iowa State (Asst)

Men's Basketball
- 1934–1953: Iowa State (Asst)

Baseball
- 1938–1942 1947–1974: Iowa State

Administrative career (AD unless noted)
- 1934–1936: Iowa State (Assistant AD)

Head coaching record
- Overall: 340–373–5

Accomplishments and honors

Championships
- 3× Big Eight Conference (1957, 1970, 1971)

Leroy Clinton "Cap" Timm (June 4, 1908 – August 7, 1987) was the longest tenured college baseball coach for the Iowa State University Cyclones located in Ames, Iowa and he held that position from the 1938 season through the 1942 season and again from the 1946 season through the 1974 season, with his tenure being interrupted due to service in World War II. In his tenure, he led Iowa State to three conference titles and two College World Series appearances. Timm died on August 7, 1987. He was inducted into the Iowa State Hall of Fame in 1997. The school's ballpark, Cap Timm Field, is named in his honor.

== Playing career ==
Timm attended high school in Arlington, Minnesota, before attending the University of Minnesota. While attending Minnesota, Timm played as both a half and quarterback on the football team, and a catcher on the baseball team.

== Head coaching record ==
Record table
Season	Team	Overall	Conference	Standing	Postseason
Iowa State Cyclones (Big Eight Conference) (1938–1974)
1938	Iowa State	11–6			
1939	Iowa State	4–12			
1940	Iowa State	10–7–1			
1941	Iowa State	10–8			
1942	Iowa State	6–7			
1947	Iowa State	7–7–1			
1948	Iowa State	7–12			
1949	Iowa State	12–6			
1950	Iowa State	8–11	4–5	5th	
1951	Iowa State	8–7			
1952	Iowa State	9–10			
1953	Iowa State	9–8			
1954	Iowa State	11–10			
1955	Iowa State	9–11	5–8	5th	
1956	Iowa State	9–9	6–6	5th	
1957	Iowa State	18–9	11–6	1st	NCAA Third Place
1958	Iowa State	8–15			
1959	Iowa State	11–12			
1960	Iowa State	14–9	12–6	2nd	
1961	Iowa State	5–14			
1962	Iowa State	10–10			
1963	Iowa State	7–14–1	4–14	7th	
1964	Iowa State	12–7			
1965	Iowa State	11–9			
1966	Iowa State	8–8	9–11	T–5th	
1967	Iowa State	10–19–2			
1968	Iowa State	11–16	9–9	4th	
1969	Iowa State	9–16	8–12		
1970	Iowa State	19–11	13–5	1st	NCAA CWS
1971	Iowa State	16–14	13–7	1st	NCAA District 5
1972	Iowa State	14–17	7–10	8th	
1973	Iowa State	9–21	3–13		
1974	Iowa State	19–17	7–10	6th	
Total:		340–373–5			
National champion Postseason invitational champion Conference regular season champion Conference regular season and conference tournament champion Division regular season champion Division regular season and conference tournament champion Conference tournament champion
