= 1970 USC Trojans baseball team =

American college baseball season

1970 USC Trojans baseball

National champions Pacific-8 Conference champions
- Conference: Pacific-8 Conference
- CB: No. 1
- Record: 45–13 (11–3 Pac-8)
- Head coach: Rod Dedeaux (29th year)
- Home stadium: Bovard Field

1970 Pacific-8 Conference baseball standings
	Conf.				Overall
Team	W		L	PCT	W		L	PCT
Northern Division
No. 13 Washington State ^{x}‍‍‍	9	–	6	.600	30	–	11	.732
Oregon State ‍‍‍	5	–	6	.455		–		–
Oregon ‍‍‍	5	–	9	.357		–		–
Washington ‍‍‍	4	–	12	.250	8	–	22	.267
Southern Division
No. 1 Southern California ^{x}‍‍‍^{y}	11	–	3	.786	45	–	13	.776
UCLA ‍‍‍	8	–	7	.533	26	–	24	.520
California ‍‍‍	9	–	8	.529	28	–	19	.596
Stanford ‍‍‍	8	–	9	.471	36	–	16	.692
† – Conference champion y – Invited to the NCAA tournament As of June 30, 1970; Rankings from Collegiate Baseball

The 1970 USC Trojans baseball team represented the University of Southern California in the 1970 NCAA University Division baseball season. The team was coached by Rod Dedeaux in his 29th season.

The Trojans won the College World Series, defeating the Florida State Seminoles in the championship game, starting a run of five consecutive national championships for USC.

== Roster ==
1970 USC Trojans roster
Pitchers: Harvey Allen; Jim Barr; Steve Busby; Walt Failor; Orrin Freeman; Jim George; Jack Harrington; Eric Raich; Wayne Schrader; Mark Sogge; Brent Strom; Greg Widman	Infielders: Frank Alfano; Dayl Arenstein; Mike Ball; Dick Cross; Larry Diel; Milt Guggia; Cal Meier; Jeff Port; Al Rossi; Dan Stoligrosz; John Vella	Outfielders: Gordon Carter; Bill Jenkins; Dave Kingman; John Morrisset; Jeff Pederson; Bob Singer; Catchers: Sam Ceci; Craig Perkins; Rick Raczka; Mike Swiderski; Coaches: Rod Dedeaux

== Schedule ==
1970 USC Trojans baseball game log
Regular season
February/March

Date	Opponent	Score	Overall record	Pac-8 record
February 27	Loyola Marymount	8–3	1–0	–
March 3	at UC Irvine	6–8	1–1	–
March 6	UC Santa Barbara	4–2	2–1	–
March 7	at UC Santa Barbara	4–2	3–1	–
March 7	at UC Santa Barbara	2–4	3–2	–
March 10	Long Beach State	13–1	4–2	–
March 13	at Fresno State	6–2	5–2	–
March 14	at Fresno State	13–6	6–2	–
March 14	at Fresno State	6–7	6–3	–
March 17	Pepperdine	3–2	7–3	–
March 20	Utah	4–2	8–3	–
March 20	at Long Beach State	8–1	9–3	–
March 21	BYU	4–0	10–3	–
March 21	BYU	4–8	10–4	–
March 23	vs. Air Force	9–10	10–5	–
March 23	at UC Riverside	12–3	11–5	–
March 25	vs. Tulsa	11–9	12–5	–
March 26	vs. Stanford	7–5	13–5	–
March 26	vs. St. John's	11–2	14–5	–
March 27	vs. Oregon State	4–0	15–5	–
March 28	vs. Arizona State	5–2	16–5	–
March 31	at San Fernando Valley State	2–7	16–6	–

April

Date	Opponent	Score	Overall record	Pac-8 record
April 1	at Chapman	7–9	16–7	–
April 2	Westmont	4–3	17–7	–
April 3	San Diego State	3–2	18–7	–
April 4	San Diego State	14–2	19–7	–
April 4	San Diego State	8–1	20–7	–
April 6	Cal State Los Angeles	7–4	21–7	–
April 7	San Fernando Valley State	4–1	22–7	–
April 11	UCLA	8–2	23–7	1–0
April 13	at Cal State Los Angeles	5–4	24–7	–
April 17	at California	4–2	25–7	2–0
April 18	at Stanford	3–0	26–7	3–0
April 18	at Stanford	1–2	26–8	3–1
April 20	at Santa Clara	16–5	27–8	–
April 21	Chapman	3–5	27–9	–
April 24	Stanford	2–7	27–10	3–2
April 25	California	10–0	28–10	4–2
April 25	California	5–14	28–11	4–3
April 28	at Cal Poly Pomona	2–3	28–12	–

May

Date	Opponent	Score	Overall record	Pac-8 record
May 1	Washington	9–3	29–12	5–3
May 1	Washington	6–4	30–12	6–3
May 2	Washington State	7–3	31–12	7–3
May 2	Washington State	12–5	32–12	8–3
May 5	Cal Poly Pomona	11–8	33–12	–
May 9	Oregon	6–0	34–12	9–3
May 15	at UCLA	8–5	35–12	10–3
May 15	UCLA	4–1	36–12	11–3

Postseason
NCAA tournament: Pacific-8 playoffs

Date	Opponent	Site/stadium	Score	Overall record
May 21	vs. Oregon State	Bovard Field	11–3	37–12
May 22	vs. UCLA	Bovard Field	8–4	38–12
May 23	vs. UCLA	Bovard Field	7–1	39–12

NCAA tournament: District 8 playoffs

Date	Opponent	Site/stadium	Score	Overall record
May 29	vs. Santa Clara	Bovard Field	12–1	40–12
May 30	vs. Santa Clara	Bovard Field	6–1	41–12

NCAA tournament: College World Series

Date	Opponent	Site/stadium	Score	Overall record
June 12	vs. Ohio	Rosenblatt Stadium	1–4	41–13
June 13	vs. Delaware	Rosenblatt Stadium	7–1	42–13
June 15	vs. Dartmouth	Rosenblatt Stadium	6–1	43–13
June 16	vs. Texas	Rosenblatt Stadium	8–7	44–13
June 18	vs. Florida State	Rosenblatt Stadium	2–1	45–13

== Awards and honors ==
Frank Alfano

- College World Series All-Tournament Team
- All-Pacific-8 Second Team

Jim Barr

- College World Series All-Tournament Team
- All-Pacific-8 Second Team

Dave Kingman

- All-America First Team
- All-Pacific-8 Second Team

Cal Meier

- All-America Second Team
- All-Pacific-8 Conference First Team

Dan Stoligrosz

- College World Series All-Tournament Team
- All-Pacific-8 Conference First Team

Brent Strom

- All-America First Team
- All-Pacific-8 Conference First Team

== Trojans in the 1970 MLB draft ==
The following members of the USC baseball program were drafted in the 1970 Major League Baseball draft.

=== June regular draft ===
Player	Position	Round	Overall	MLB Team
Daniel Stoligrosz	3B	14th	321st	Cleveland Indians

=== June secondary draft ===
Player	Position	Round	Overall	MLB Team
Dave Kingman	OF	1st	1st	San Francisco Giants
Brent Strom	LHP	1st	3rd	New York Mets
Cal Meier	SS	2nd	26th	Kansas City Royals
Jim Barr	RHP	3rd	49th	San Francisco Giants

=== January secondary draft ===
Player	Position	Round	Overall	MLB Team
Cal Meier	SS	2nd	37th	Kansas City Royals
Jim Barr	RHP	3rd	49th	San Francisco Giants
