= 1970 NCAA College Division baseball tournament =

- Season: 1970
- Teams: 14
- Finals site: Meador Park; Springfield, Missouri
- Champions: Valley State (1st title)
- Runner-up: Nicholls State (1st CWS Appearance)
- Winning coach: Bob Hiegert (1st title)
- MOP: Chuck Stone (Valley State)

The 1970 NCAA College Division baseball tournament decided the champion of baseball at the NCAA College Division level for the 1970 season. This was the third such tournament for the College Division, having separated from the University Division in 1957. The Valley State Matadors (now Cal State Northridge) won the championship by defeating the Nicholls State.

== Format ==
Fourteen teams were selected to participate, divided into four regions. Three regions consisted of four teams, while the Midwest Region had two. Each region completed a double-elimination round, with the winners advancing to the finals. The finals, made up of the four regional champions, also competed in a double-elimination format.

== Regionals ==
=== East Regional ===
Team	Wins	Losses
Springfield	3	1
Florida Southern	3	2
Ithaca	1	2
Stetson	0	2

=== Mideast Regional ===
Team	Wins	Losses
Nicholls State	4	1
SIU Edwardsville	2	2
Illinois State	1	2
Union (TN)	0	2

=== Midwest Regional ===
Team	Wins	Losses
Southwest Missouri State	2	1
Minnesota State–Mankato	1	2

=== West Regional ===
Team	Wins	Losses
Valley State	3	1
Chapman	3	2
Sacramento State	1	2
UC Irvine	0	2

== Finals ==
=== Participants ===
School	Conference	Record (conference)	Head coach	Previous finals appearances	Best finals finish	Finals record
Valley State	CCAA	41–21 (18–6)	Bob Hiegert	0 (last: none)	none	0–0
Southwest Missouri State	Missouri Intercollegiate	23–13 (9–3)	Bill Rowe	1 (last: 1969)	2nd	2–2
Nicholls State	GSC	35–19 (14–8)	Raymond Didier	0 (last: none)	none	0–0
Springfield	Independent	20–9–1	Archie Allen	0 (last: none)	none	0–0

=== Results ===
==== Bracket ====
First round
Nicholls State	3
Springfield	1
Southwest Missouri State	6
Valley State	2
Lower round 1
Springfield	3
Valley State	5

Semi-finals
Nicholls State	8
Southwest Missouri State	5
Lower final
Southwest Missouri State	1
Valley State	6

Finals
Nicholls State	5	1
Valley State	9	2

==== Game results ====
Game	Winner	Score	Loser	Notes
Game 1	Nicholls State	3–1	Springfield	
Game 2	Southwest Missouri State	6–2	Valley State	
Game 3	Valley State	5–3	Springfield	Springfield eliminated
Game 4	Nicholls State	8–5	Southwest Missouri State	
Game 5	Valley State	6–1	Southwest Missouri State	Southwest Missouri State eliminated
Game 6	Valley State	9–5	Nicholls State	
Game 7	Valley State	2–1	Nicholls State	Valley State wins National Championship

== See also ==
- 1970 NCAA University Division baseball tournament
- 1970 NAIA World Series
