= Rico Clark =

American football player (born 1974)

No. 27, 21, 39, 40, 41
- Position: Cornerback

Personal information
- Born: June 6, 1974 (age 52); Atlanta, Georgia, U.S.
- Listed height: 5 ft 10 in (1.78 m)
- Listed weight: 181 lb (82 kg)

Career information
- High school: Lakeside (DeKalb County, Georgia)
- College: Louisville (1992–1996)
- NFL draft: 1997: undrafted

Career history
- Indianapolis Colts (1997–1998); Cincinnati Bengals (1999); New England Patriots (1999); Amsterdam Admirals (2000); Memphis Maniax (2001); Dallas Desperados (2002); Carolina Cobras (2002)

Awards and highlights
- Second-team All-Conference USA (1995, 1996)
- Stats at Pro Football Reference
- Stats at ArenaFan.com

Rico Cornell Clark (born June 6, 1974) is an American former professional football player who was a cornerback in the National Football League (NFL) with the Indianapolis Colts, Cincinnati Bengals, and New England Patriots. He played college football for the Louisville Cardinals. He also played in NFL Europe, the XFL, and the Arena Football League (AFL).

== Early life ==
Rico Cornell Clark was born on June 6, 1974, in Atlanta. He played high school football at Lakeside High School in DeKalb County, Georgia, and helped them win the state title.

== College career ==
Clark enrolled at the University of Louisville to play college football for the Cardinals. He was redshirted in 1992. He was then a four-year letterman from 1993 to 1996 and a three-year starter. Clark earned second-team All-Conference USA honors in both 1995 and 1996. He finished his college career with totals of 264 tackles, six interceptions for 95 yards, 14 kick returns for 268 yards, and 50 punt returns for 346 yards.

== Professional career ==
After going undrafted in the 1997 NFL draft, Clark signed with the Indianapolis Colts on April 27, 1997. He was released on August 18, signed to the practice squad on August 25, released again on October 8, signed to the practice squad again on November 4, and promoted to the active roster on November 25, 1997. He played in four games, starting two, for the Colts during the 1997 season, posting seven solo tackles, one assisted tackle, and one interception for 14 yards. Clark appeared in all 16 games for Indianapolis in 1998, totaling eight solo tackles, one assisted tackle, one interception for 30 yards, and three kick returns for 38 yards. He was waived on September 5, 1999, before the start of the regular season.

Clark was claimed off waivers by the Cincinnati Bengals on September 6, 1999. He played in eight games, starting one, for the Bengals during the 1999 season, recording 16 solo tackles, two assisted tackles, and five pass breakups. He was released on December 14, 1999.

Clark signed with the New England Patriots on December 29, 1999. He played in the regular season finale but did not record any statistics.

Clark played in four games, starting two, for the Amsterdam Admirals of NFL Europe in 2000, accumulating 20 tackles on defense, one special teams tackle, two interceptions for 29 yards and one touchdown, and four pass breakups.

Clark started all ten games for the Memphis Maniax of the XFL in 2001, posting 48 tackles and one interception for 31 yards. The Maniax finished the year with a 5–5 record.

On January 31, 2002, Clark signed with the Dallas Desperados of the Arena Football League (AFL). He was a wide receiver/defensive back during his time in the AFL as the league played under ironman rules. He played in one game for the Desperados, recording three solo tackles and one fumble recovery. On May 28, 2002, he was traded to the Carolina Cobras for Jeremy Beutler. Clark was placed on refused to report on May 30, and activated on June 6. He was waived on June 26, 2002, before playing in any games for the Cobras.
