= Mike Horton (American football) =

American football player (born 1997)

No. 66
- Position: Offensive guard

Personal information
- Born: October 7, 1997 (age 29); Atlanta, Georgia, U.S.
- Listed height: 6 ft 4 in (1.93 m)
- Listed weight: 325 lb (147 kg)

Career information
- High school: Lakeside (Atlanta)
- College: Auburn (2015–2019)
- NFL draft: 2020: undrafted

Career history
- Carolina Panthers (2020–2022); Arlington Renegades (2023)

Awards and highlights
- XFL champion (2023)

Career NFL statistics
- Games played: 3
- Stats at Pro Football Reference

Mike Horton (born October 7, 1997) is an American former professional football player who was an offensive guard for the Carolina Panthers of the National Football League (NFL). He played college football for the Auburn Tigers.

== Early life ==
Horton was born in Atlanta, Georgia, on October 7, 1996, or 1997. He attended Lakeside High School and was ranked a three-star prospect. He was a two-way player at tackle in football and also played basketball and competed in track and field. Horton was named a first-team all-region player, was selected to the Semper Fi All-American Bowl, and was ranked by 247Sports as one of the top-60 prospects in the state, additionally being ranked the 23rd-best nationally at his position by ESPN. He received interest from numerous NCAA Division I FBS teams and initially committed to play for the Florida Gators, but later flipped to Auburn.

== College career ==
As a true freshman at Auburn in 2015, Horton redshirted. The following year, he appeared in 12 games, seeing extensive action as the sixth offensive lineman on the depth chart, often playing as an extra blocker in run formations. He started seven games in 2017, mainly as a left guard. Horton moved to right guard in 2018 but didn't have a great transition, ranking 627th out of 836 college lineman according to Pro Football Focus' rankings. He started 12 games as a senior in 2019, finishing his stint at the school with 32 career starts.

== Professional career ==
=== Carolina Panthers ===
After going unselected in the 2020 NFL draft, Horton was signed by the Carolina Panthers as an undrafted free agent. He was released at the final rosters cuts and was afterwards re-signed to the practice squad. He was elevated to the active roster as a COVID-19 replacement for their game against the New Orleans Saints, but did not play and returned to the practice squad afterwards. He was elevated again for the team's following game against the Atlanta Falcons, but was inactive. He was signed to a reserve/future contract on January 4, 2021.

Horton was released at roster cuts again in 2021, being re-signed to the practice squad soon after. He was released from the practice squad on September 14, but was brought back on September 27. He was elevated to the active roster for their week 10 game against the Arizona Cardinals, and made his debut in the game, appearing on six special teams snaps, 24% of their total special teams snaps. He received another elevation for their game against the Tampa Bay Buccaneers in week 16 and appeared on two snaps. Horton was elevated for a final time against the New Orleans Saints one week later and played three snaps. He thus played in a total of three games in the 2021 season, appearing on 11 snaps. He signed a reserve/future contract on January 10, 2022. Horton was released by the Panthers following the 2022 preseason and was not re-signed to the practice squad.

=== Arlington Renegades ===
Horton was selected in the third round (18th overall) of the offensive line phase of the 2023 XFL draft by the Arlington Renegades. He made the team's final roster and appeared in all 10 games as a starter, helping them win the 2023 XFL Championship Game over the DC Defenders. He was not part of the roster after the 2024 UFL dispersal draft on January 15, 2024.
