= 1970 Texas Longhorns baseball team =

University baseball team (1970)

1970 Texas Longhorns baseball

SWC champions

College World Series, 3–2
- Conference: Southwest Conference
- Record: 45–8 (14–1 SWC)
- Head coach: Cliff Gustafson (3rd year)
- Home stadium: Clark Field

1970 Southwest Conference baseball standings
	Conf.				Overall
Team	W		L	PCT	W		L	PCT
No. 3 Texas ‍†‍‍^{y}	14	–	1	.933	45	–	8	.849
Texas A&M ‍‍‍	13	–	4	.765	25	–	9	.735
Rice ‍‍‍	10	–	7	.588	18	–	11	.621
TCU ‍‍‍	9	–	8	.529	17	–	15	.531
Texas Tech ‍‍‍	5	–	10	.333	12	–	16	.429
Baylor ‍‍‍	4	–	14	.222	16	–	21	.432
SMU ‍‍‍	3	–	14	.176	3	–	29	.094
† – Conference champion y – Invited to the NCAA tournament As of June 30, 1970; Rankings from Collegiate Baseball

The 1970 Texas Longhorns baseball team represented the University of Texas at Austin in the 1970 NCAA University Division baseball season. The Longhorns played their home games at Clark Field. The team was coached by Cliff Gustafson in his 3rd season at Texas.

The Longhorns reached the College World Series, finishing third, having split two games with eventual runner-up Florida State, a holding wins over Delaware and Ohio and a fourteen-inning loss to eventual champion Southern California.

== Personnel ==
=== Roster ===
1970 Texas Longhorns roster
Pitchers: 4 - Mike Beard; 5 - James Street; 10 - Natividad Salazar; 17 - Larry Hardy; 20 - Burt Hooton; Catchers: 22 - Tommy Harmon	Infielders: 1 - Louis Bagwell; 3 - David Chalk; 7 - John D. Langerhans; 8 - Patrick John Amos; Outfielders: 2 - Mike Markl; 12 - David Hall; 13 - Jack Miller	Utility: 16 - James Crouch; 21 - Walter S. Rothe; 24 - Patrick D. Thompson; 30 - Mike Sweeney

== Schedule and results ==
Legend
Texas win
Texas loss
Tie

1970 Texas Longhorns baseball game log
Regular season

February
Date	Opponent	Site/stadium	Score	Overall record	SWC record
Feb 27	Sam Houston State*	Clark Field • Austin, TX	W 12–1	1–0	
Feb 27	Sam Houston State*	Clark Field • Austin, TX	W 10–0	2–0	
Feb 28	Sam Houston State*	Clark Field • Austin, TX	W 14–0	3–0	
Feb 28	Sam Houston State*	Clark Field • Austin, TX	L 1–3	3–1	

March
Date	Opponent	Site/stadium	Score	Overall record	SWC record
Mar 3	Texas Lutheran*	Clark Field • Austin, TX	W 8–1	4–1	
Mar 3	Texas Lutheran*	Clark Field • Austin, TX	W 11–4	5–1	
Mar 6	Houston*	Clark Field • Austin, TX	W 2–1	6–1	
Mar 6	Houston*	Clark Field • Austin, TX	L 2–6	6–2	
Mar 13	Oklahoma*	Clark Field • Austin, TX	W 3–2	7–2	
Mar 13	Oklahoma*	Clark Field • Austin, TX	L 2–3	7–3	
Mar 14	Oklahoma*	Clark Field • Austin, TX	W 5–1	8–3	
Mar 14	Oklahoma*	Clark Field • Austin, TX	W 6–2	9–3	
Mar 20	SMU	Clark Field • Austin, TX	W 8–0	10–3	1–0
Mar 20	SMU	Clark Field • Austin, TX	W 10–5	11–3	2–0
Mar 21	SMU	Clark Field • Austin, TX	W 17–4	12–3	3–0
Mar 23	Minnesota*	Clark Field • Austin, TX	W 4–2	13–3	
Mar 23	Minnesota*	Clark Field • Austin, TX	L 0–4	13–4	
Mar 24	Minnesota*	Clark Field • Austin, TX	W 6–0	14–4	
Mar 24	Minnesota*	Clark Field • Austin, TX	W 22–5	15–4	
Mar 26	Phillips*	Clark Field • Austin, TX	W 6–0	16–4	
Mar 26	Phillips*	Clark Field • Austin, TX	W 8–3	17–4	
Mar 30	Lamar Tech*	Clark Field • Austin, TX	W 12–0	18–4	
Mar 30	Lamar Tech*	Clark Field • Austin, TX	W 10–0	19–4	

April/May
Date	Opponent	Site/stadium	Score	Overall record	SWC record
Apr 3	at Texas Tech	Lubbock, TX	W 4–0 (Note: James Street threw a 7-inning perfect game.)	20–4	4–0
Apr 3	at Texas Tech	Lubbock, TX	W 6–3	21–4	5–0
Apr 7	at St. Mary's*	San Antonio, TX	W 2–1	22–4	
Apr 7	at St. Mary's*	San Antonio, TX	L 6–7	22–5	
Apr 8	at Texas Lutheran*	Seguin, TX	W 2–0	23–5	
Apr 8	at Texas Lutheran*	Seguin, TX	W 5–0	24–5	
Apr 17	Baylor	Clark Field • Austin, TX	W 2–0	25–5	6–0
Apr 17	Baylor	Clark Field • Austin, TX	W 9–3	26–5	7–0
Apr 18	Baylor	Clark Field • Austin, TX	W 2–1	27–5	8–0
Apr 24	at TCU	TCU Diamond • Fort Worth, TX	W 2–0	28–5	9–0
Apr 24	at TCU	TCU Diamond • Fort Worth, TX	W 14–0	29–5	10–0
Apr 30	at Rice	Houston, TX	W 2–1	30–5	11–0
Apr 30	at Rice	Houston, TX	W 5–1	31–5	12–0
May 7	Texas A&M	Clark Field • Austin, TX	L 5–7	31–6	12–1
May 7	Texas A&M	Clark Field • Austin, TX	W 8–0	32–6	13–1
May 8	Texas A&M	Clark Field • Austin, TX	W 5–3	33–6	14–1

Postseason

District 6 playoffs
Date	Opponent	Site/stadium	Score	Overall record	NCAAT record
May 28	Arkansas State	Clark Field • Austin, TX	W 5–0	34–6	1–0
May 29	Texas–Pan American	Clark Field • Austin, TX	W 2–1	35–6	2–0
May 30	Texas–Pan American	Clark Field • Austin, TX	W 4–3^{11}	36–6	3–0

Exhibitions
Date	Opponent	Site/stadium	Score	Overall record
June 5	at La Grange Demons	La Grange, TX	W 9–6	37–6
June 5	at La Grange Demons	La Grange, TX	W 13–3	38–5
June 6	San Antonio Spurs	Clark Field • Austin, TX	W 5–0	39–6
June 6	San Antonio Spurs	Clark Field • Austin, TX	W 8–2	40–6
June 8	at Seguin Sox	Seguin, TX	W 15–3	41–6
June 8	at Seguin Sox	Seguin, TX	W 7–1	42–6

College World Series
Date	Opponent	Site/stadium	Score	Overall record	CWS record
June 12	Delaware	Johnny Rosenblatt Stadium • Omaha, NE	W 12–4	43–6	1–0
June 14	Ohio	Johnny Rosenblatt Stadium • Omaha, NE	W 7–2	44–6	2–0
June 15	Florida State	Johnny Rosenblatt Stadium • Omaha, NE	W 5–1	45–6	3–0
June 16	Southern California	Johnny Rosenblatt Stadium • Omaha, NE	L 7–8^{14}	45–7	3–1
June 17	Florida State	Johnny Rosenblatt Stadium • Omaha, NE	L 2–11	45–8	3–2

== Perfect game ==
On April 3, 1970 James Street shutout Texas Tech 4–0 over 7 innings in Lubbock, Texas to secure the first and only perfect game in Longhorn's history. This was also the only perfect game in the history of the Southwest Conference.

Friday, April 3, 1970 at Tech Diamond in Lubbock, TX
Team	1	2	3	4	5	6	7	R	H	E
Texas Longhorns	0	1	0	0	0	2	1	4	8	0
Texas Tech Red Raiders	0	0	0	0	0	0	0	0	0	2
WP: James Street LP: Notes: 1st and only Perfect Game in the history of the Texas Longhorns and the Southwest Conference
