= Lakeside High School (DeKalb County, Georgia) =

Public high school in DeKalb County, Georgia, United States

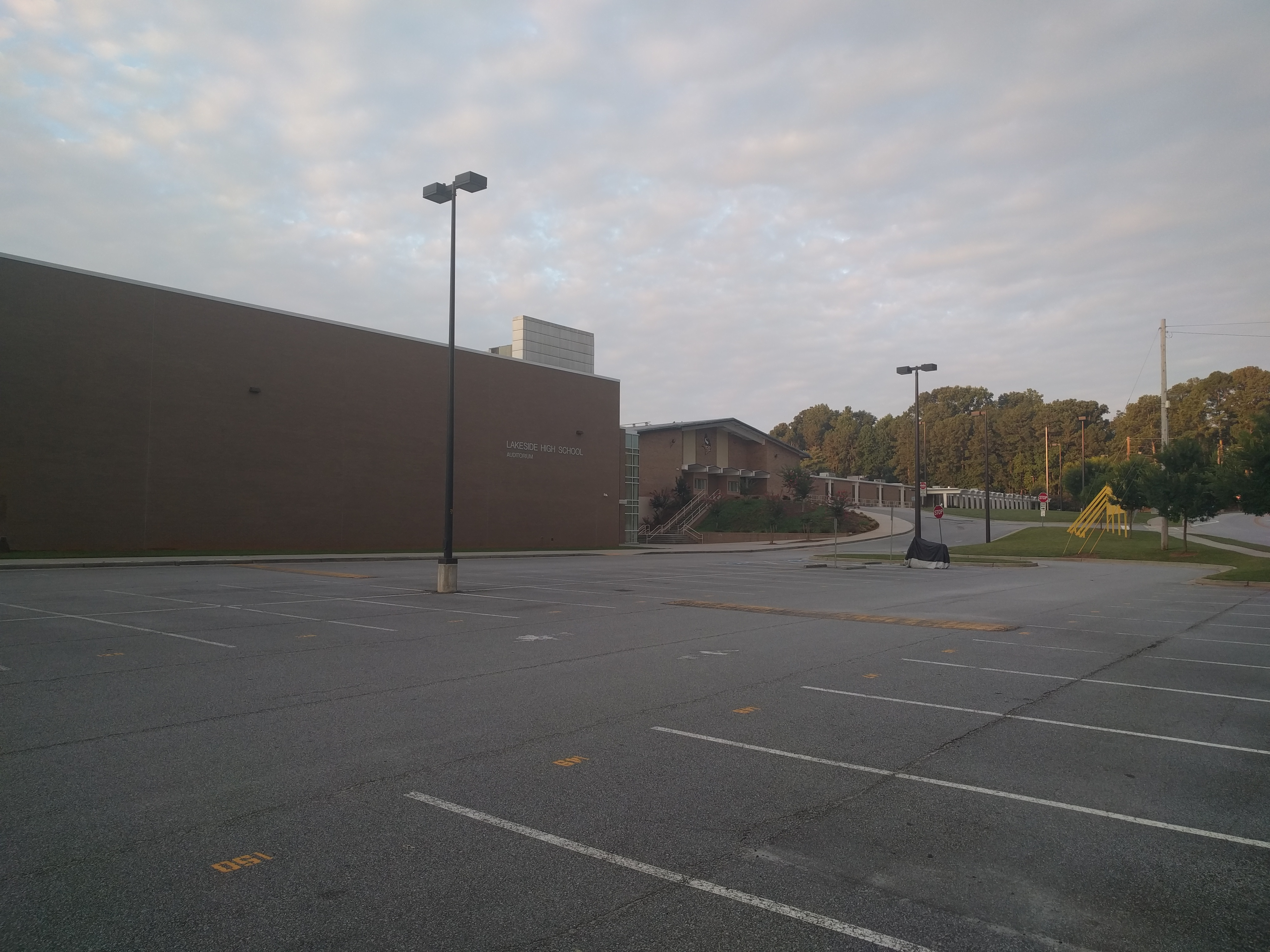
- Lakeside High School

Location
- 3801 Briarcliff Road NE; Atlanta, Georgia; United States; 33°50′43″N 84°17′05″W

Information
- Type: Public
- Established: 1964
- School district: DeKalb County School System
- Principal: Dr. Susan M. Stoddard
- Teaching staff: 127.50 (FTE)
- Grades: 9–12
- Enrollment: 2,186 (2023-2024)
- Student to teacher ratio: 17.15
- Campus: Suburban
- Colors: Purple and gold
- Athletics: Baseball, Basketball, Cross Country, Flag Football, Tackle Football, Golf, Gymnastics, Lacrosse, Soccer, Softball, Swim, Dive, Tennis, Track And Field, Volleyball, and Wrestling
- Mascot: Vikings
- Rival: Tucker High School
- National ranking: 5,242
- Newspaper: The Lakeside Legend
- Yearbook: Valhalla
- Graduation rate: 84% (below state median)
- Website: lakesidehs.dekalb.k12.ga.us

Lakeside High School is a public high school in unincorporated DeKalb County, Georgia, United States. The school is a part of the DeKalb County School District.

Lakeside is a public school encompassing grades 9-12. The school serves students from the North Druid Hills and Northlake area of DeKalb County.

Lakeside High School opened its doors in 1964. It completed a $23 million renovation and addition in the summer of 2012, adding a new classroom wing and a performing arts building.

In Newsweek magazine's 2005 list of the best 1,200 public high schools in the nation, Lakeside ranked at 107, the highest in Georgia. In the 2006 edition of the list, which is based on the number of AP and IB tests taken as compared to the number of graduating seniors, Lakeside ranked 135, just below Riverwood High School in nearby Sandy Springs, which ranked 132. In US News and World Report’s 2024 HS Rankings, Lakeside ranked 4,371 nationally and 109 in Georgia.

== Demographics ==
The student body is composed of 46% White, 22% Hispanic, 32% Black, 7.4% Asian, and 14% other racial groups. These numbers include 9.2% students with disabilities, 36% economically disadvantaged, and 5.5% English language learners.

== Attendance boundary ==
The zoning boundary includes:

- North Decatur CDP (part)
- North Druid Hills CDP (part)

== Feeder schools ==
The following elementary schools feed into Lakeside:

- Briarlake
- Evansdale
- Hawthorne
- Henderson Mill
- Oak Grove
- Pleasantdale
- Sagamore Hills

Henderson Middle School is Lakeside's feeder middle school. A small minority of the students come from private schools, including Cliff Valley, Immaculate Heart of Mary Catholic School and Intown Community School, as well as the charter school The Globe Academy.

== Staff ==
The school has a professional staff of 170, including 120 teaching faculty, seven administrators, and seven counselors. As of 2020, Dr. Susan Stoddard has served as the principal of Lakeside.

== Curriculum ==
In addition to a range of extracurricular activities, a curriculum is offered from a standardized system-wide program of studies. A high percentage of students take advanced and gifted classes.

22 Advanced Placement courses are offered in English Literature and Composition, Calculus AB and BC, Statistics, Biology, Chemistry, Environmental Science, Physics, Microeconomics, World History, Psychology, American History, American Government, Computer Science, French Language, Spanish Language, Music Theory, Studio Art Drawing, 2-D and 3-D, and Art History. Advanced or accelerated courses, and courses for the gifted, are offered in English, math, science, French, Spanish, and social science. Lakeside administered 1164 AP exams during the 2011–2012 school year.

Local colleges and universities coordinate joint enrollment programs with Lakeside to serve students who wish to pursue college courses while still in high school.

== Sports and extracurricular activities ==
As of the 2021–22 season.

Type	Competition	State Titles	Season(s)	Sources
Boys Sports	Baseball	0		
Boys Sports	Basketball	0		
Boys Sports	Cross Country	5	1969, 1970, 1972, 1973, 1975	
Boys Sports	Football	3	1970, 1972, 1991	
Boys Sports	Golf	0		
Boys Sports	Ice Hockey	0		
Boys Sports	Lacrosse	0		
Boys Sports	Soccer	7	1970, 1974, 1975, 1978, 1981, 1997, 2008	
Boys Sports	Swimming	0		
Boys Sports	Wrestling	1	1997	
Boys Sports	Tennis	4	1980, 1981, 1982, 2001	
Boys Sports	Track & Field	2	1970, 1974	
Girls Sports	Basketball	0		
Girls Sports	Cheerleading	0		
Girls Sports	Cross Country	0		
Girls Sports	Golf	0		
Girls Sports	Lacrosse	0		
Girls Sports	Soccer	0		
Girls Sports	Softball	0		
Girls Sports	Swimming	6	1969, 1970, 1971, 1977, 1978, 1981	
Girls Sports	Tennis	1	1984	
Girls Sports	Track & Field	0		
Girls Sports	Volleyball	0		

Key:

School Boys' Record
School Girls' Record

For the 2016–17 season, Lakeside High School competed in GHSA Region 7-AAAAAAA.

Lakeside's achievements include:

- Lakeside won the football state championships in 1970, 1972, and 1991. The 1972 team was unscored upon during the ten game regular season. They had the #1 ranked high school quarterback in the country as well as being the #2 ranked team in the nation.
- Lakeside's men's varsity ultimate frisbee was ranked 7th in the nation in 2015.
- Lakeside's men's varsity soccer team won the state championship in 2008, defeating Southeast Whitfield High School.
- Men's soccer has won the State Championship 7 times (1970, 1974, 1975, 1978, 1981, 1997, and 2008).
- Lakeside men's Cross Country State Champions: 1969, 1970, 1972, 1973, 1975
- Lakeside gymnastics State Champions (men's 1973, women's 9 straight from 1971 to 1979)
- Lakeside women's swimming has 6 State Championships (1969, 1970, 1971, 1977, 1978, 1981)
- Lakeside men's tennis State Champions (1980, 1981, 1982, 2001), Women's Tennis (1984)
- Lakeside men's track State Champions (1970, 1974)
- Lakeside men's wrestling State Champions (1997)
- Lakeside Reading Bowl State Champions (2023, 2024)

=== Football ===
The Vikings won state championships in 1970, 1972, and 1991. The team plays at Adams Memorial Stadium and Avondale Stadium.

=== Newspaper ===
The Lakeside Legend was voted "Superior" by GSPA. The newspaper is offered as a fourth period class.

=== Baseball ===
28 players from Lakeside's last ten graduating classes have gone on to play college or professional baseball.

=== Band ===
The band has performed and won awards in competitions in Chicago, Washington D.C., Myrtle Beach, Orlando, and Hawaii. The Marching Band routinely competes in marching competitions. The band also contains an active jazz band, winter drumline, color guard, and winter guard, which competes in the Southern Association of Performance Arts (SAPA) and won first place in class SrA (2011), and second place in IrA (2012). The band sends four separate groups to the Georgia District IV Large Group Performance Evaluations each year, and currently has the highest number of students from the county in the All-State Band (2010, 2011, 2012, 2013) and the most students in the Atlanta Youth Wind Symphony from any one school (2010, 2011, 2014), in addition to having the largest band enrollment in DeKalb County School District.

The Jazz Band, in past years, hosted an annual swing dance, presented by the Atlanta Swing Era Dance Association, with swing dance lessons taught by Down South Swing.

=== Theatre ===
Lakeside's theatre department has been flourishing for many years, especially after the addition of the new Fine Arts Building. The school produces several shows each year, including a Spring musical. In the 2016–2017 school year, their production of Hairspray sold out five shows. The program has won several awards. The Importance of Being Earnest (2014) and The Miss Firecracker Contest (2015) placed first at the regional level in the Georgia High School Association One-act competition, with The Importance of Being Earnest (2014) winning third place in the state competition. Several cast members have also received honors at regional and state levels. In the fall of 2017, the Lakeside Theatre Company performed a one-act version of Philip Dawkins' play Failure: A Love Story at the Georgia Theatre Conference (GTC). It was named Best Show, and went on to compete at the South Eastern Theatre Conference (SETC) in March 2018. The show placed 2nd overall and several cast members received individual awards. The Lakeside Theatre Company has received several honorable mentions at the Georgia High School Theatre Awards. Their first nomination was in 2018, and their first win in 2020 for the choreography of "Mary Poppins."

== Notable alumni ==
- Alec Kann (class of 2008) - former MLS player for the Chicago Fire, FC Cincinnati, Sporting Kansas City and Atlanta United
- Rico Clark (class of 1992) - former NFL player for the Colts, Cincinnati Bengals, and Patriots
- Kim Bullard - pianist, songwriter, record producer, film composer, former band member of Poco
- Ron Cash - former professional baseball player (Detroit Tigers)
- Greg Davis (class of 1983) - former NFL kicker, 1987-1998
- David Ryan Harris - singer-songwriter
- Tim Hornsby - 2012 and 2016 Olympic kayaker
- Mike Horton - professional football player
- Dave Neal - ESPN sportscaster
- Samantha Power, Irish-born Harvard University professor, journalist and former policy advisor to US President Barack Obama, US Ambassador to the UN
- Huey Richardson - 15th overall pick in the 1991 NFL draft
- Jay Alan Sekulow - Attorney Chief Counsel for the American Center for Law and Justice (ACLJ), TV and radio talk show host, frequent guest commentator on the Christian Broadcasting Network and the Fox News Channel
- Murray Silver (class of 1971) - author, filmmaker, television producer
- Keisha Waites - state representative for Georgia's 60th district
