= 1970 NAIA World Series =

1970 NAIA baseball tournament
- 1970 NAIA World Series
- Teams: 8
- Format: Double elimination
- Finals site: Phoenix Municipal Stadium; Phoenix, Arizona
- Champions: Eastern Michigan (1st title)
- Winning coach: Ron Oestrike
- MVP: Jeff Peck (3B) (Eastern Michigan)

The 1970 NAIA World Series was the 14th annual tournament hosted by the National Association of Intercollegiate Athletics to determine the national champion of baseball among its member colleges and universities in the United States and Canada.

The tournament was played at Phoenix Municipal Stadium in Phoenix, Arizona.

Eastern Michigan (41-11) defeated Northeast Louisiana (35-19) in the second game of the championship series, 1–0, to win the Hurons' first NAIA World Series.

Eastern Michigan third baseman Jeff Peck was named tournament MVP.

== Bracket ==
Upper round 1
Livingston | 4
New Haven | 5
Eastern Michigan | 2
Kansas State Teachers | 1
Central Washington State | 3
William Jewell | 4
Northeast Louisiana | 8
Pembroke State | 3

Upper round 2
New Haven | 2
Eastern Michigan | 4
William Jewell | 0
Northeast Louisiana | 8
Lower round 1
Livingston | 2
Kansas State Teachers | 1
Central Washington State | 2
Pembroke State | 5

Upper final
Eastern Michigan | 6
Northeast Louisiana | 4
Lower round 2
William Jewell | 2
Livingston | 5
New Haven | 7
Pembroke State | 6

Semifinals
Eastern Michigan | 3
Livingston | 2
Northeast Louisiana | 8
New Haven | 7

Final
Eastern Michigan | 6 | 1
Northeast Louisiana | 7 | 0

== See also ==
- 1970 NCAA University Division baseball tournament
- 1970 NCAA College Division baseball tournament
