= Dave Neal =

American sportscaster

Dave Neal, son of Bob Neal and Melody Gadziala, is a two-time Emmy Award winning American sportscaster currently employed by ESPN. He has two sons Sam and Pete.

He is from Atlanta, Georgia and attended Lakeside High School.

== Broadcast career ==
Dave Neal graduated from Florida State University with a bachelor's degree in communications and then began his career as a sports anchor for WTXL-TV in Tallahassee, Fla. in 1989.

In 1993, he moved to Fox Sports Net (FSN), where he later became a reporter for the network’s Atlanta Braves and Atlanta Hawks pregame shows. This led to his role as host of The Braves Report from 1994 to 2002, FSN’s live pregame show for Braves telecasts. He was the network’s pregame host during the Braves run to become World Series Champions in 1995. At FSN, Neal called play-by-play for the Atlanta Braves, Atlanta Hawks, and Charlotte Hornets telecasts. He also covered numerous special events and programming such as the XII Pan American Games from Mar Del Plata, Argentina.

From 1995 to 2009, Neal also covered the Southeastern Conference (SEC) for FSN, Jefferson Pilot Sports, Lincoln Financial Sports, and Raycom Sports. In addition to taking up play-by-play duties, Neal hosted SEC-TV, a weekly program featuring SEC athletics. His hosting roles also included Raycom Sports coverage of the SEC Men’s Basketball Tournament, as well as Inside the SEC Championships.

In 2009, he joined ESPN as a play-by-play commentator and has since served as the prominent voice of the SEC on ESPN. Neal provided the play by play for the conference’s syndicated Saturday game alongside Heisman Award winner Andre Ware.

Neal was on the inaugural roster of SEC Network commentators when it launched in 2014. He currently provides TV and radio play-by-play coverage of SEC Championship football, basketball and baseball. Additionally, he calls college football, basketball, and baseball games on other ESPN networks. His work includes play-by-play for FCS National Championships, numerous post-season bowl games, NIT tournaments and CWS regional and super regional games. Neal can also be heard across the country on the popular weekly syndicated radio show, The SEC Football Report.
