= NCAA College Division =

Historic subdivision of the NCAA

The NCAA College Division was a historic subdivision of the National Collegiate Athletic Association (NCAA) consisting of member schools competing at a lower level of college sports. The NCAA initially divided schools into a College Division and a University Division. The College Division was split into two smaller groups in 1973 with the creation of NCAA Division II, which allows its members to award limited athletic scholarships, and Division III, which prohibits athletic scholarships.

The College Division began for purposes of college basketball. In August 1956, NCAA executive director Walter Byers announced that, starting in 1957, the NCAA would hold separate basketball tournaments for major schools and smaller colleges. Approximately 156 major schools competing in the "University Division" would compete for 24 spots in the University Division tournament, while 285 smaller schools in the "College Division" would compete for 32 spots in a separate tournament.

== See also ==
- NCAA College Division baseball tournaments: 1968, 1969, 1970, 1971, 1972, 1973
- NCAA College Division basketball tournaments: 1957, 1958, 1959, 1960, 1961, 1962, 1963, 1964, 1965, 1966, 1967, 1968, 1969, 1970, 1971, 1972, 1973
- NCAA College Division football seasons: 1962, 1963, 1964, 1965, 1966, 1967, 1968, 1969, 1970, 1971, 1972
