= Cap Timm Field =

Ballpark in Ames, Iowa

- Interactive map of Cap Timm Field
- Full name: Cap Timm Field at ISU Southwest Athletic Complex
- Location: Recreation Rd, Ames, Iowa
- Coordinates: 42.01841°N 93.65355°W
- Capacity: 3,000
- Surface: Grass with grass infield
- Field size: 330 LF; 395 CF; 320 RF

Construction
- Opened: 1968

Tenants
- Iowa State Cyclones baseball (Big Eight Conference) (1968-1996) (Big 12 Conference) (1997-2001)

Cap Timm Field is a baseball field located in Ames, Iowa and has been the home of the Iowa State Cyclones baseball program for four decades, a span that includes its time as both a varsity intercollegiate sport and a club sport. The ballpark is named after former Cyclones baseball coach Cap Timm.
