= 1969 NCAA College Division baseball tournament =

- Season: 1969
- Teams: 17
- Finals site: Meador Park; Springfield, Missouri
- Champions: Illinois State Redbirds (1st title)
- Runner-up: Southwest Missouri State Bears (1st CWS Appearance)
- Winning coach: Duffy Bass (1st title)
- MOP: Tom Klein (Illinois State)

The 1969 NCAA College Division baseball tournament decided the champion of baseball at the NCAA College Division level for the 1969 season. This was the second such tournament for the College Division, having separated from the University Division in 1957. The Illinois State Redbirds won the championship by defeating the Southwest Missouri State Bears.

== Format ==
Seventeen teams were selected to participate, divided into four regions. Three regions consisted of four teams, while the West Region had five. Each region completed a double-elimination round, with the winners advancing to the finals. The finals, made up of the four regional champions, also competed in a double-elimination format.

== Regionals ==
=== East Regional ===
Team	Wins	Losses
Florida Southern	3	0
Springfield	2	2
Ithaca	1	2
Upsala	0	2

=== Mideast Regional ===
Team	Wins	Losses
Illinois State	3	0
Delta State	2	2
Valparaiso	1	2
Tuskegee	0	2

=== Midwest Regional ===
Team	Wins	Losses
Southwest Missouri State	3	0
North Dakota State	2	2
Minnesota	1	2
Luther	0	2

=== West Regional ===
Team	Wins	Losses
Puget Sound	5	2
Chapman	2	2
Portland State	2	2
Seattle Pacific	1	2
Sacramento State	0	2

== Finals ==
=== Participants ===
School	Conference	Record (conference)	Head coach	Previous finals appearances	Best finals finish	Finals record
Florida Southern	Independent	28–6–2	Hal Smeltzly	0 (last: none)	none	0–0
Illinois State	Interstate	33–5 (3–3)	Duffy Bass	0 (last: none)	none	0–0
Puget Sound	Independent	25–7–1	Jack McGee	0 (last: none)	none	0–0
Southwest Missouri State	Missouri Intercollegiate	27–10 (11–1)	Bill Rowe	0 (last: none)	none	0–0

=== Results ===
==== Bracket ====
Upper round 1
Illinois State	5
Puget Sound	3
Southwest Missouri State	6
Florida Southern	3
Lower round 1
Puget Sound	10
Florida Southern	13

Upper final
Illinois State	5
Southwest Missouri State	1
Lower final
Southwest Missouri State	11
Florida Southern	5

Final
Illinois State	12	—
Southwest Missouri State	0	—

==== Game results ====
Game	Winner	Score	Loser	Notes
Game 1	Illinois State	5–3	Puget Sound	
Game 2	Southwest Missouri State	6–3	Florida Southern	
Game 3	Florida Southern	13–10	Puget Sound	Puget Sound eliminated
Game 4	Illinois State	5–1	Southwest Missouri State	
Game 5	Southwest Missouri State	11–5	Florida Southern	Florida Southern eliminated
Game 6	Illinois State	12–0	Florida Southern	Illinois State wins National Championship

== See also ==
- 1969 NCAA University Division baseball tournament
- 1969 NAIA World Series
