= 1970 Dartmouth Indians baseball team =

Brian DeCook catcher Grosse Pointe Woods Michigan 1975-1977

1970 Dartmouth Indians baseball

EIBL Champions District I Champions

College World Series, T-7th
- Conference: Eastern Intercollegiate Baseball League
- CB: No. 5
- Record: 24–10 (11–2 EIBL)
- Head coach: Tony Lupien (14th season)
- Captain: Bruce Saylor
- Home stadium: Red Rolfe Field

1970 Eastern Intercollegiate Baseball League standings
	Conf.						Overall
Team	W		L		T	PCT	W		L		T	PCT
No. 5 Dartmouth ‍†‍‍^{y}	11	–	2	–	0	.846	24	–	10	–	0	.706
Harvard ‍‍‍	10	–	4	–	0	.714	24	–	7	–	0	.774
Princeton ‍‍‍	10	–	4	–	0	.714	20	–	8	–	0	.714
Navy ‍‍‍	9	–	5	–	0	.643	20	–	7	–	0	.741
Cornell ‍‍‍	6	–	7	–	1	.464	19	–	17	–	2	.526
Brown ‍‍‍	5	–	7	–	0	.417	13	–	14	–	2	.483
Penn ‍‍‍	4	–	8	–	1	.346	7	–	12	–	2	.381
Army ‍‍‍	4	–	9	–	0	.308	7	–	14	–	0	.333
Yale ‍‍‍	3	–	9	–	0	.250	6	–	23	–	0	.207
Columbia ‍‍‍	3	–	10	–	0	.231	4	–	11	–	0	.267
† – Conference champion y – Invited to the NCAA tournament

The 1970 Dartmouth Indians baseball team represented Dartmouth College in the 1970 NCAA University Division baseball season. The Indians played their home games at Red Rolfe Field. The team was coached by Tony Lupien serving his 14th year at Dartmouth.

The Indians won the Eastern Intercollegiate Baseball League championship and advanced to the College World Series, where they were defeated by the USC Trojans.

Brian DeCook Catcher Grosse Pointe Woods Michigan

1970 Dartmouth Indians baseball team
Players
Coaches

#	Pos.	Name	B/T	Height	Weight	Year	Home town
	P	Russell Adams	/	—	—	Jr	New Wilmington, Pennsylvania
	P	Pete Broberg	/	—	—
		Fred Crossman	/	—	—	So
	INF	Craig Conklin	/	—	—
		Bud Dagirmanjian	/	—	—	Sr	Whitinsville, Massachusetts
		David Deitz	/	—	—	Jr	Franklin Lakes, New Jersey
		Richard Griebel	/	—	—	Jr	Smoke Rise, New Jersey
	OF	Tom Hanna	/	—	—	Jr	Keene, New Hampshire
		Tim Hannigan	/	—	—	Jr	Scarsdale, New York
		Don Hooper	/	—	—
		Charlie Janes	/	—	—	So
		Frank Mannarino	/	—	—	So
	INF	Bob Mlakar	/	—	—	Sr	Moreland Hills, Ohio
		John Prado	/	—	—	Jr	Westernport, Maryland
		William Saumsiegle	/	—	—	Jr	Needham, Massachusetts
	OF	Bruce Saylor (C)	/	—	—	Sr	Caldwell, New Jersey
	P	Charles Seelbach	/	—	—	Sr
		Wayne Young	/	—	—	So

Head coach

Tony Lupien

Assistant coach(es)

Legend

- (C) Team captain
- (S) Suspended
- (I) Ineligible
- Injured
- Current redshirt

== Schedule ==
1970 Dartmouth Indians baseball game log
Regular season
March (2–6)

#	Date	Opponent	Site/stadium	Score	Overall record	EIBL record
1	March 23	at NC State	Doak Field • Raleigh, North Carolina	0–7	0–1	0–0
2	March 24	at NC State	Doak Field • Raleigh, North Carolina	4–0	1–1	0–0
3	March 24	at NC State	Doak Field • Raleigh, North Carolina	9–5	2–1	0–0
4	March 25	at NC State	Doak Field • Raleigh, North Carolina	1–4	2–2	0–0
5	March 25	at NC State	Doak Field • Raleigh, North Carolina	3–4	2–3	0–0
6	March 26	at Wake Forest	Ernie Shore Field • Winston-Salem, North Carolina	6–7	2–4	0–0
7	March 27	at East Carolina	Unknown • Greenville, North Carolina	0–1	2–5	0–0
8	March 28	at East Carolina	Unknown • Greenville, North Carolina	1–8	2–6	0–0

April (8–2)

#	Date	Opponent	Site/stadium	Score	Overall record	EIBL record
9	April 10	at Columbia	Robertson Field at Satow Stadium • New York, New York	5–10	2–7	0–1
10	April 11	at Princeton	Bill Clarke Field • Princeton, New Jersey	5–0	3–7	1–1
11	April 11	at Princeton	Bill Clarke Field • Princeton, New Jersey	7–8	3–8	1–2
12	April 13	Boston University	Red Rolfe Field • Hanover, New Hampshire	7–3	4–8	1–2
13	April 18	at Harvard	Soldier's Field • Boston, Massachusetts	5–2	5–8	2–2
14	April 18	at Harvard	Soldier's Field • Boston, Massachusetts	1–0	6–8	3–2
15	April 25	at Yale	Yale Field • West Haven, Connecticut	7–4	7–8	4–2
16	April 25	at Yale	Yale Field • West Haven, Connecticut	3–2	8–8	5–2
17	April 26	at Brown	Murray Stadium • Providence, Rhode Island	16–10	9–8	6–2
18	April 29	at Massachusetts	Unknown • Amherst, Massachusetts	8–4	10–8	6–2

May (10–0)

#	Date	Opponent	Site/stadium	Score	Overall record	EIBL record
19	May 1	Army	Red Rolfe Field • Hanover, New Hampshire	13–3	11–8	7–2
20	May 2	Cornell	Red Rolfe Field • Hanover, New Hampshire	3–2	12–8	8–2
21	May 2	Cornell	Red Rolfe Field • Hanover, New Hampshire	3–2	13–8	9–2
22	May 8	Navy	Red Rolfe Field • Hanover, New Hampshire	9–8	14–8	10–2
23	May 9	Holy Cross	Red Rolfe Field • Hanover, New Hampshire	4–2	15–8	10–2
24	May 12	at Boston College	Eddie Pellagrini Diamond at John Shea Field • Chestnut Hill, Massachusetts	6–5	16–8	10–2
25	May 13	at New Hampshire	Unknown • Durham, New Hampshire	4–2	17–8	10–2
26	May 16	Penn	Red Rolfe Field • Hanover, New Hampshire	5–0	18–8	11–2
27	May 22	at Springfield	Unknown • Springfield, Massachusetts	5–3	19–8	11–2
28	May 25	Vermont	Red Rolfe Field • Hanover, New Hampshire	4–0	20–8	11–2

Postseason
District I Playoffs (3–0)

#	Date	Opponent	Site/stadium	Score	Overall record	EIBL record
29	June 2	Providence	Red Rolfe Field • Hanover, New Hampshire	7–2	21–8	11–2
30	June 3	Connecticut	Red Rolfe Field • Hanover, New Hampshire	8–2	22–8	11–2
31	June 4	Connecticut	Red Rolfe Field • Hanover, New Hampshire	12–3	23–8	11–2

College World Series (1–2)

#	Date	Opponent	Site/stadium	Score	Overall record	EIBL record
32	June 13	vs Iowa State	Johnny Rosenblatt Stadium • Omaha, Nebraska	7–6	24–8	11–2
33	June 14	vs Florida State	Johnny Rosenblatt Stadium • Omaha, Nebraska	0–6	24–9	11–2
14	June 15	vs USC	Johnny Rosenblatt Stadium • Omaha, Nebraska	1–6	24–10	11–2

== Awards and honors ==
Craig Conklin

- First Team All-EIBL

Tom Hanna

- Second Team All-EI Marc S. Gruber
- First Team All-EIBL

Chuck Seelbach

- First Team All-EIBL
