= 1970 NCAA University Division baseball season =

Baseball season

- Number of teams: 207
- Preseason No. 1: Southern California
- Defending champions: Arizona State

NCAA tournament

College World Series
- Duration: June 12, 1970 – June 18, 1970
- Champions: Southern California (6th title)
- Runners-up: Florida State (5 CWS Appearance)
- Winning coach: Rod Dedeaux (6th title)
- MOP: Gene Ammann (Florida State)

Seasons
- ← 1969 1971 →

The 1970 NCAA University Division baseball season, play of college baseball in the United States organized by the National Collegiate Athletic Association (NCAA) began in the spring of 1970. The season progressed through the regular season and concluded with the 1970 College World Series. The College World Series, held for the 24th time in 1970, consisted of one team from each of eight geographical districts and was held in Omaha, Nebraska at Johnny Rosenblatt Stadium as a double-elimination tournament. Southern California claimed the championship.

== Conference winners ==
This is a partial list of conference champions from the 1970 season. Each of the eight geographical districts chose, by various methods, the team that would represent them in the NCAA tournament. 11 teams earned automatic bids by winning their conference championship while 15 teams earned at-large selections.

Conference	Regular season winner
Atlantic Coast Conference	Maryland
Big Eight Conference	Iowa State
Big Ten Conference	Minnesota
EIBL	Dartmouth
Mid-American Conference	Ohio
Pacific-8 Conference	North - Washington State; South - Southern California
Southeastern Conference	Mississippi State
Southern Conference	North - William & Mary; South - East Carolina
Southwest Conference	Texas
Yankee Conference	Connecticut; Maine

== Conference standings ==
The following is an incomplete list of conference standings:

1970 Big Eight Conference baseball standings
	Conf.				Overall
Team	W		L	PCT	W		L	PCT
No. 6 Iowa State ‍†‍‍^{y}	13	–	5	.722	19	–	11	.633
Kansas ‍‍‍	10	–	7	.588	15	–	8	.652
Nebraska ‍‍‍	11	–	8	.579	15	–	11	.577
Oklahoma ‍‍‍	10	–	9	.526	20	–	17	.541
Missouri ‍‍‍	8	–	9	.471	12	–	13	.480
Kansas State ‍‍‍	8	–	10	.444	13	–	16	.448
Colorado ‍‍‍	6	–	12	.333	14	–	16	.467
Oklahoma State ‍‍‍	5	–	11	.313	12	–	16	.429
† – Conference champion y – Invited to the NCAA tournament As of June 30, 1970; Rankings from Collegiate Baseball

1970 Southern Conference baseball standings
	Conf.				Overall
Team	W		L	PCT	W		L	PCT
Northern
William & Mary ^{x}‍‍‍	9	–	6	.600	17	–	16	.515
George Washington ‍‍‍	11	–	8	.579	17	–	18	.486
Richmond ‍‍‍	5	–	9	.357	9	–	13	.409
VMI ‍‍‍	4	–	9	.308	6	–	13	.316
Southern
No. 25 East Carolina ^{x}‍‍‍^{y}	13	–	6	.684	18	–	11	.621
Furman ‍‍‍	9	–	6	.600	18	–	11	.621
The Citadel ‍‍‍	6	–	8	.429	13	–	11	.542
Davidson ‍‍‍	5	–	10	.333	10	–	15	.400
x – Division champion y – Invited to the NCAA tournament As of June 30, 1970; Rankings from Collegiate Baseball

1970 Eastern Intercollegiate Baseball League standings
	Conf.						Overall
Team	W		L		T	PCT	W		L		T	PCT
No. 5 Dartmouth ‍†‍‍^{y}	11	–	2	–	0	.846	24	–	10	–	0	.706
Harvard ‍‍‍	10	–	4	–	0	.714	24	–	7	–	0	.774
Princeton ‍‍‍	10	–	4	–	0	.714	20	–	8	–	0	.714
Navy ‍‍‍	9	–	5	–	0	.643	20	–	7	–	0	.741
Cornell ‍‍‍	6	–	7	–	1	.464	19	–	17	–	2	.526
Brown ‍‍‍	5	–	7	–	0	.417	13	–	14	–	2	.483
Penn ‍‍‍	4	–	8	–	1	.346	7	–	12	–	2	.381
Army ‍‍‍	4	–	9	–	0	.308	7	–	14	–	0	.333
Yale ‍‍‍	3	–	9	–	0	.250	6	–	23	–	0	.207
Columbia ‍‍‍	3	–	10	–	0	.231	4	–	11	–	0	.267
† – Conference champion y – Invited to the NCAA tournament

1970 Southwest Conference baseball standings
	Conf.				Overall
Team	W		L	PCT	W		L	PCT
No. 3 Texas ‍†‍‍^{y}	14	–	1	.933	45	–	8	.849
Texas A&M ‍‍‍	13	–	4	.765	25	–	9	.735
Rice ‍‍‍	10	–	7	.588	18	–	11	.621
TCU ‍‍‍	9	–	8	.529	17	–	15	.531
Texas Tech ‍‍‍	5	–	10	.333	12	–	16	.429
Baylor ‍‍‍	4	–	14	.222	16	–	21	.432
SMU ‍‍‍	3	–	14	.176	3	–	29	.094
† – Conference champion y – Invited to the NCAA tournament As of June 30, 1970; Rankings from Collegiate Baseball

1970 Pacific-8 Conference baseball standings
	Conf.				Overall
Team	W		L	PCT	W		L	PCT
Northern Division
No. 13 Washington State ^{x}‍‍‍	9	–	6	.600	30	–	11	.732
Oregon State ‍‍‍	5	–	6	.455		–		–
Oregon ‍‍‍	5	–	9	.357		–		–
Washington ‍‍‍	4	–	12	.250	8	–	22	.267
Southern Division
No. 1 Southern California ^{x}‍‍‍^{y}	11	–	3	.786	45	–	13	.776
UCLA ‍‍‍	8	–	7	.533	26	–	24	.520
California ‍‍‍	9	–	8	.529	28	–	19	.596
Stanford ‍‍‍	8	–	9	.471	36	–	16	.692
† – Conference champion y – Invited to the NCAA tournament As of June 30, 1970; Rankings from Collegiate Baseball

1970 Western Athletic Conference baseball standings
	Conf.				Overall
Team	W		L	PCT	W		L	PCT
Northern
No. 27 BYU ‍‍‍	14	–	3	.824	31	–	14	.689
Wyoming ‍‍‍	12	–	6	.667	19	–	14	.576
Utah ‍‍‍	3	–	10	.231	20	–	18	.526
Colorado State ‍‍‍	2	–	12	.143	9	–	18	.333
Southern
No. 7 Arizona ‍‍‍^{y}	11	–	7	.611	44	–	18	.710
Arizona State ‍‍‍	9	–	9	.500	30	–	22	.577
New Mexico ‍‍‍	9	–	9	.500	27	–	18	.600
UTEP ‍‍‍	7	–	11	.389	26	–	23	.531
† – Conference champion y – Invited to the NCAA tournament As of June 30, 1970; Rankings from Collegiate Baseball

== College World Series ==
The 1970 season marked the twenty fourth NCAA baseball tournament, which culminated with the eight team College World Series. The College World Series was held in Omaha, Nebraska. The eight teams played a double-elimination format, with Southern California claiming their sixth championship with a 2–1, fifteen inning win over Florida State in the final.

Upper round 1
Texas	12
Delaware	4
Ohio	4
Southern California	1
Florida State	4
Arizona	0
Dartmouth	7
Iowa State	6

Upper round 2
Texas	7
Ohio	2
Florida State	6
Dartmouth	0
Lower round 1
Delaware	1
Southern California	7
Arizona	1
Iowa State	7

Upper final
Texas	5
Florida State	1
Lower round 2
Dartmouth	1
Southern California	6
Ohio	9
Iowa State	6

Semifinals
Texas	7
Southern California	8^{14}
Florida State	2
Ohio	0

Preliminary final
Texas	2
Florida State	11

Final
Southern California	2^{15}
Florida State	1
