= Leon Hooten =

American baseball player (born 1948)

- Pitcher
- Born: April 4, 1948 (age 78); Downey, California, U.S.
- Batted: Right Threw: Right

MLB debut
- April 13, 1974, for the Oakland Athletics

Last MLB appearance
- May 6, 1974, for the Oakland Athletics

MLB statistics
- Win–loss record: 0–0
- Earned run average: 3.24
- Strikeouts: 1
- Stats at Baseball Reference

Teams
- Oakland Athletics (1974)

Michael Leon Hooten (born April 4, 1948) is an American former Major League Baseball pitcher. He played for the Oakland Athletics during the 1974 season.
