= Pat Osburn =

American baseball player (born 1949)

- Pitcher
- Born: May 4, 1949 (age 77); Murray, Kentucky, U.S.
- Batted: Left Threw: Left

MLB debut
- April 13, 1974, for the Cincinnati Reds

Last MLB appearance
- September 22, 1975, for the Milwaukee Brewers

MLB statistics
- Win–loss record: 0–1
- Earned run average: 6.53
- Strikeouts: 5
- Stats at Baseball Reference

Teams
- Cincinnati Reds (1974); Milwaukee Brewers (1975)

Larry Patrick "Pat" Osburn (born May 4, 1949) is an American retired professional baseball pitcher. Osburn played six seasons in professional baseball, including two in Major League Baseball with the Cincinnati Reds (1974) and the Milwaukee Brewers (1975). He was drafted a total of four times, but did not sign after his first three selections. In the 1970 Major League Baseball draft (secondary phase), Osburn was drafted by the Cincinnati Reds and eventually signed. Over his career, Osburn went 0–1 with a 6.53 earned run average (ERA) and five strikeouts in six games, one start.

Osburn began his professional career with the Triple-A Indianapolis Indians in 1971. He played for the Indians, who were in the Cincinnati Reds' affiliated minor league organization, for the next four seasons (1971–1974). He also played for the Triple-A Sacramento Solons (1975) in the Milwaukee Brewers organization, and the Double-A Jacksonville Suns (1976) in the Kansas City Royals organization. Over his minor league career, Osburn went 43–37 with a 3.61 ERA in 134 games, 114 starts.

== Amateur career ==
Osburn attended Clearwater High School in Clearwater, Florida where he was drafted by the St. Louis Cardinals in the 33^{rd} round of the 1967 Major League Baseball draft. While attending Clearwater High School, Osburn played quarterback on the football team and was honored with the "Black and Blue Award" by The Evening Independent after he was injured in a game in September 1966. After the 1967 baseball season, the St. Petersburg Times named Osburn as the "Most Valuable Baseball Performer". Osburn played his freshman season at Rollins College. Osburn went on to attend Manatee Community College. In 1968, he played collegiate summer baseball with the Orleans Cardinals of the Cape Cod Baseball League and was named a league all-star. He played for the United States national baseball team in the 1968 World Amateur Baseball Championship where he struck out 10 in seven innings pitched against the Cuba national baseball team.

At Manatee Community College in 1969, Osburn went 10–1 with a 0.74 earned run average (ERA), and 158 strikeouts. Osburn was drafted twice in 1969, first by the Chicago White Sox in the second round of the June amateur draft, and then by the Seattle Pilots in the first round of the June secondary draft. Osburn said he did not sign with the St. Louis Cardinals and the Chicago White Sox because he did not want to undersell himself, and that he was weary of signing with the Pilots because it was an organization that he "hadn't heard of". He ended-up not signing with the Pilots and instead went on to attend Florida State University. Osburn was selected in the first round of the 1970 Major League Baseball draft by the Cincinnati Reds, and eventually signed.

== Professional career ==
=== Cincinnati Reds ===
In 1971, Osburn began his professional career in the Cincinnati Reds organization. He attended spring training with the Reds, officially making it his professional debut. Reds' manager Sparky Anderson hinted during spring that it could be a possibility that Osburn could make the final 25-man roster., however, on April 2, Osburn was sent to the minor leagues. He was assigned to the Triple-A Indianapolis Indians. In July, Osburn had the lowest earned run average (ERA) in the American Association. On the season, he went 8–8 with a 2.51 ERA, five complete games, two shutouts, and 125 strikeouts in 27 games, all starts. Osburn was fifth in the league in strikeouts, and ninth in ERA. Osburn joined the Reds as a non-roster invitee for spring training in 1972. He started the season with the Triple-A Indianapolis Indians. On the season, Osburn went 8–8 with a 5.28 ERA, one complete game, and 71 strikeouts in 26 games, 24 starts. In 1973, Osburn again started the season with the Indians of the American Association. During the season, Osburn had a five-game winning streak until August 18. He finished the season with a record of 11–7 with a 3.69 ERA in 28 games, 27 starts.

Out of spring training in 1974, Osburn made the Reds' 25-man roster. He made his major league debut on April 13, against the Atlanta Braves, where in two innings pitched Osburn gave-up three earned runs. After sustaining an injury in June, Osburn was sent down the Triple-A Indianapolis Indians by the Reds. Pitcher Dick Baney was called up in place of Osburn. In the majors that season, Osburn was involved in no decisions with an 8.00 ERA, and four strikeouts in six games. During his time in the minors, Osburn went 2–3 with a 2.54 ERA, one complete game, and 28 strikeouts in 11 games, seven starts. The Associated Press reported that Osburn "quit" after being sent to the minors.

=== Later career ===
On October 22, 1974, the Cincinnati Reds traded Osburn to the Milwaukee Brewers for John Vukovich. Osburn was the last player to be cut from the spring training roster in 1975. He was then assigned to the Triple-A Sacramento Solons of the Pacific Coast League. Early in the season, Osburn was placed on the disabled list with a sore arm. It was noted by The Evening Independent that Osburn was got better as the year went on. On August 28, the Brewers noted that they would only call-up one player when the roster expanded to 40 players on September 1, and that it would be Osburn. In the minors that season, Osburn went 7–7 with a 4.62 ERA, three complete games, one shutout, one save, and 85 strikeouts in 28 games, 15 starts. In the majors, Osburn went 0–1 with a 5.40 ERA, and one strikeout in six games, with one start. On December 22, 1975, Osburn was traded by the Brewers to the Kansas City Royals for outfielder Kenzie Davis. Osburn spent the entire 1976 season with the Double-A Jacksonville Suns of the Southern League. On the season, he went 7–4 with a 2.32 ERA, seven complete games, two shutouts, and 52 strikeouts in 14 games, all starts. That season would prove to be his last in professional baseball.

== Personal life ==
Pat Osburn's children Patrick Chasey Osburn, Lindsey Jean Osburn, Lauren Nicole Osburn, and Victoria Hailey Osburn. Osburn's father is named William M. Osburn. Osburn engaged Valerie Iris Irene Boyd, daughter of Florida State Senator Wilbur H. Boyd. Osburn was also the brother-in-law of catcher Milt May. Osburn and his wife had their first child, a girl, in 1974. During his playing career, Osburn resided in Holmes Beach, Florida.
