= Eric Raich =

American baseball player (born 1951)

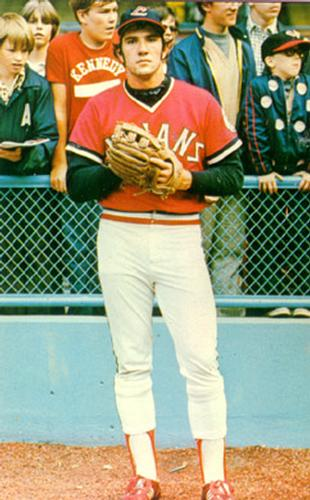
- Pitcher
- Born: November 1, 1951 (age 74); Detroit, Michigan, U.S.
- Batted: Right Threw: Right

MLB debut
- May 24, 1975, for the Cleveland Indians

Last MLB appearance
- September 12, 1976, for the Cleveland Indians

MLB statistics
- Win–loss record: 7–8
- Earned run average: 5.85
- Strikeouts: 35
- Stats at Baseball Reference

Teams
- Cleveland Indians (1975–1976)

Eric James Raich (born November 1, 1951) is an American former professional baseball player. A 6 ft 4 in (1.93 m), 225 lb (102 kg) right-handed pitcher, he appeared in Major League Baseball for the Cleveland Indians in 1975–1976, pitching in 19 career games. He currently works as a pitching instructor at The Brunswick B.A.T. Cage baseball training facility in a suburb of Cleveland, Ohio.

Raich attended Dominguez High School of Compton, California, and the University of Southern California. He was selected by the Indians with the first overall pick in the January 1972 Major League Baseball draft. In 1975, Raich started 17 games for the Indians (making one relief appearance) and registered his two career complete games, winning seven of 15 decisions and compiling an earned run average of 5.54 in 922/3 innings pitched. He worked in only one game and 2 2/3 innings for Cleveland at the tail end of the following season. He spent the rest of his career in minor league baseball, leaving the game after the 1978 season.

Altogether, he allowed 125 hits and 31 bases on balls in 951/3 Major League innings, striking out 35.
