= Iowa State Cyclones baseball =

- Founded: 1892
- Defunct: 2001; 25 years ago
- Conference history: Big 12 (1997–2001); Big Eight (1929–1996); Missouri Valley (1907–1928)
- Overall record: 1,346–1,412–17
- University: Iowa State University
- Location: Ames, Iowa
- Home stadium: Cap Timm Field
- Nickname: Cyclones (Mascot: Cy the Cardinal)
- Colors: Cardinal and gold

College World Series appearances
- 1957, 1970

NCAA tournament appearances
- 1957, 1970, 1971

Conference regular season champions
- 1936, 1957, 1970, 1971

Iowa State Cyclones baseball was the intercollegiate baseball program at Iowa State University in Ames, Iowa. The program existed from 1892 to 2001. Due to budget cuts, Iowa State athletic director Bruce Van De Velde announced the end of the baseball program on April 2, 2001.

Iowa State's last game was a 17–4 loss to Oklahoma State in the Big 12 Tournament on May 18, 2001.

Iowa State is one of just five "Power conference" teams to not have a baseball team, along with Colorado, Syracuse, Wisconsin and SMU.

== Iowa State in the NCAA Tournament ==
Year	Record	Pct	Notes
1957	4–2	.667	College World Series 3rd Place, District 5 Champion
1970	3–2	.600	College World Series 5th Place, Hosted District 5
1971	0–2	.000	District 5
TOTALS	7–6	.538	

== Club baseball ==
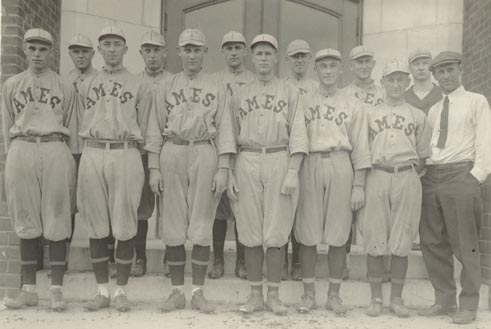
1918 Iowa State baseball team

Since the fall of 2001, baseball at Iowa State has been played as a club sport in the National Club Baseball Association.

== Yearly record ==
Statistics overview
Season	Coach	Overall	Conference	Standing	Postseason
Iowa State (Independent) (1892–1906)
1892	Unknown	5–0			
1893	W. E. Harriman	3–2			
1894	W. S. Dawson	0–1			
1895	J. R. Davidson	1–4			
1896	C. O. Poole	7–6			
1897	N/A	N/A	N/A		
1898	Ira C. Brownlie	2–4			
1899	Unknown	0–3			
1900	T. E. Nicoll	2–6			
1901	C. E. Woodruff	4–4			
1902	R. H. Hall	8–3			
1903	Ernest Cotton	14–5			
1904	C. B. Wilson	16–3			
1905	A. V. Green	14–5			
1906	Clyde Williams	3–3–1			
Iowa State (Big Eight Conference) (1907–1996)
1907	Clyde Williams	15–2–1			
1908	Clyde Williams	11–1–1			
1909	Clyde Williams	10–6–2			
1910	Unknown	7–6–1			
1911	Unknown	12–3			
1912	Unknown	7–6			
1913	Homer C. Hubbard	8–5–1			
1914	Homer C. Hubbard	8–5			
1915	Homer C. Hubbard	2–8–1			
1916	Clyde Williams	7–9			
1917	Clyde Williams	5–7			
1918	Clyde Williams	9–7			
1919	Charles W. Mayser	8–2–1			
1920	Charles W. Mayser	10–6			
1921	Maurice A. Kent	7–10			
1922	Maurice A. Kent	9–9			
1923	William S. Chandler	10–3			
1924	William S. Chandler	11–5			
1925	William S. Chandler	5–7			
1926	William S. Chandler	7–10			
1927	William S. Chandler	3–14			
1928	William S. Chandler	5–11			
1929	C. Noel Workman	5–10	2–7	6th	
1930	C. Noel Workman	6–12	4–10	5th	
1931	Louis E. Menze	3–8			
1932	Louis E. Menze	9–5			
1933	Louis E. Menze	3–9			
1934	Louis E. Menze	5–9	N/A	N/A	
1935	Louis E. Menze	12–3			
1936	Joseph Truskowski	11–1	8–0	1st	
1937	Joseph Truskowski	9–8			
1938	Leroy C. "Cap" Timm	11–6			
1939	Leroy C. "Cap" Timm	4–12			
1940	Leroy C. "Cap" Timm	10–7–1			
1941	Leroy C. "Cap" Timm	10–8			
1942	Leroy C. "Cap" Timm	6–7			
1943	Clay Sutherland	6–7	N/A	N/A	
1944	Clay Sutherland	4–4–1	N/A	N/A	
1945	Clay Sutherland	4–8	N/A	N/A	
1946	Clay Sutherland	12–4			
1947	Leroy C. "Cap" Timm	7–7–1			
1948	Leroy C. "Cap" Timm	7–12			
1949	Leroy C. "Cap" Timm	12–6			
1950	Leroy C. "Cap" Timm	8–11	4–5	5th	
1951	Leroy C. "Cap" Timm	8–7			
1952	Leroy C. "Cap" Timm	9–10			
1953	Leroy C. "Cap" Timm	9–8			
1954	Leroy C. "Cap" Timm	11–10			
1955	Leroy C. "Cap" Timm	9–11	5–8	5th	
1956	Leroy C. "Cap" Timm	9–9	6–6	5th	
1957	Leroy C. "Cap" Timm	17–10	11–6	1st	NCAA Third Place
1958	Leroy C. "Cap" Timm	8–15			
1959	Leroy C. "Cap" Timm	11–12			
1960	Leroy C. "Cap" Timm	14–9	12–6	2nd	
1961	Leroy C. "Cap" Timm	5–14			
1962	Leroy C. "Cap" Timm	10–10			
1963	Leroy C. "Cap" Timm	7–14–1	4–14	7th	
1964	Leroy C. "Cap" Timm	12–7			
1965	Leroy C. "Cap" Timm	11–9			
1966	Leroy C. "Cap" Timm	8–8	9–11	T–5th	
1967	Leroy C. "Cap" Timm	10–19–2			
1968	Leroy C. "Cap" Timm	11–16	9–9	4th	
1969	Leroy C. "Cap" Timm	9–16	8–12		
1970	Leroy C. "Cap" Timm	19–11	13–5	1st	NCAA CWS
1971	Leroy C. "Cap" Timm	16–14	13–7	1st	NCAA District 5
1972	Leroy C. "Cap" Timm	14–17	7–10	8th	
1973	Leroy C. "Cap" Timm	9–21	3–13		
1974	Leroy C. "Cap" Timm	19–17	7–10	6th	
1975	Clair Rierson	23–19	11–9		
1976	Clair Rierson	29–32	3–2	3rd	
1977	Clair Rierson	21–27	3–9	4th (East)	
1978	Clair Rierson	17–25	3–9	4th (East)	
1979	Clair Rierson	21–28	7–13	4th (East)	
1980	Clair Rierson	22–30	5–15	4th (East)	
1981	Larry Corrigan	34–22	6–18	7th	
1982	Larry Corrigan	30–26	6–18	6th	
1983	Larry Corrigan	21–26	5–9		
1984	Larry Corrigan	18–27	6–12		
1985	Bobby Randall	22–38	6–15		
1986	Bobby Randall	25–33–1	6–17		
1987	Bobby Randall	25–27	7–13		
1988	Bobby Randall	27–31	8–16	T–5th	
1989	Bobby Randall	33–27	11–13		
1990	Bobby Randall	36–26			
1991	Bobby Randall	33–26	12–12		
1992	Bobby Randall	33–23	11–13	T–4th	
1993	Bobby Randall	17–28	5–18	7th	
1994	Bobby Randall	30–28	15–14	4th	
1995	Bobby Randall	28–24	13–12		
1996	Lyle Smith	23–31	12–14		
Iowa State (Big 12 Conference) (1997–2001)
1997	Lyle Smith	21–31	6–21	11th	
1998	Lyle Smith	20–27	10–18	9th	
1999	Lyle Smith	17–36	2–28	11th	
2000	Lyle Smith	19–37	7–23	10th	
2001	Lyle Smith	24–29–1	11–15	8th	
Total:		1,346–1,412–17			
National champion Postseason invitational champion Conference regular season champion Conference regular season and conference tournament champion Division regular season champion Division regular season and conference tournament champion Conference tournament champion

School	Season	Record	(Conf. Record)	Postseason
Total	110 years	1,346–1,412–17	(479–694)	3 Postseason bids

== Final poll rankings ==
This is a table of Iowa State's ranking in the Collegiate Baseball Division I Final Polls.

Season	Ranking
1970	#6
1971	#16

== First Team All-Americans ==
This is a list of Iowa State American Baseball Coaches Association All-Americans.

- 1975

Randy Duarte (2B)

- 1991

Tom Vantiger (OF)

== Head coaching history ==
#	Name	Years	Record
1	Unknown	1891–1892	5–0
2	W. E. Harriman	1892–1893	3–2
3	W. S. Dawson	1893–1894	0–1
4	J. R. Davidson	1894–1895	1–4
5	C. O. Poole	1895–1897	7–6
7	Ira C. Brownlie	1897–1898	2–4
??	Unknown	1898–1899	0–3
??	T. E. Nicoll	1899–1900	2–6
??	C. E. Woodruff	1900–1901	4–4
??	R. H. Hall	1901–1902	8–3
??	Ernest Cotton	1902–1903	14–5
??	C. B. Wilson	1903–1904	16–3
??	A. V. Green	1904–1905	14–5
??	Samuel Clyde Williams	1905–1909	39–12
??	Unknown	1909–1910	7–6–1
??	Unknown	1910–1911	12–3
??	Unknown	1911–1912	7–6
??	Homer C. Hubbard	1912–1915	18–18–2
??	Samuel Clyde Williams	1915–1918	21–23
??	Charles W. Mayser	1918–1920	18–8–1
??	Maurice A. Kent	1920–1922	16–19
??	William S. Chandler	1922–1928	41–50
??	C. Noel Workman	1928–1930	11–22
??	Louis E. Menze	1930–1935	32–34
??	Joseph Truskowski	1935–1937	20–9
??	Leroy C. "Cap" Timm	1937–1942	41–34
??	Clay Sutherland	1942–1946	26–23–1
??	Leroy C. "Cap" Timm	1946–1974	301–340–5
??	Clair Rierson	1974–1980	133–161
??	Larry Corrigan	1980–1984	103–101
??	Bobby Randall	1984–1995	309–311–1
??	Lyle Smith	1995–2001	124–191–1
