= Ron Cash =

American baseball player (1949–2009)

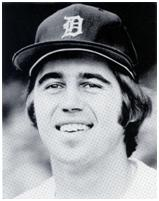
- Infielder / outfielder
- Born: November 20, 1949; Atlanta, Georgia, U.S.
- Died: April 22, 2009 (aged 59); Tampa, Florida, U.S.
- Batted: Right Threw: Right

MLB debut
- September 4, 1973, for the Detroit Tigers

Last MLB appearance
- October 2, 1974, for the Detroit Tigers

MLB statistics
- Batting average: .297
- Runs: 14
- Runs batted in: 11
- On-base percentage: .324
- Slugging average: .347
- Games played: 34
- Stats at Baseball Reference

Teams
- Detroit Tigers (1973–1974)

Ronald Forrest Cash (November 20, 1949 – April 22, 2009) was an American utility player in Major League Baseball who played from 1973 through 1974 for the Detroit Tigers. Listed at 6 ft 0 in (1.83 m), 180 lb., Cash batted and threw right-handed. He was born in Atlanta, Georgia.

Cash attended Manatee Community College and Florida State University, appearing in the 1968 Junior College World Series and 1970 College World Series. He was drafted five times and never signed, being selected by the Los Angeles Dodgers (1967), Baltimore Orioles (1968), Atlanta Braves (1968), San Diego Padres (1969) and Minnesota Twins (1969).

Finally, Cash signed with Detroit in 1971 and debuted with the Tigers on September 4, 1973, hitting a .410 batting average (16-for-39) in 14 games. He divided his playing time between left field and third base, while in 1974 he appeared mostly at first base and third.

Cash also played for Triple-A Toledo Mud Hens in 1973 and for the Cangrejeros de Santurce of the Puerto Rico Baseball League in the 1973–1974 season under manager Frank Robinson.

In a two-season majors career, Cash was a .297 hitter (30-for-101) in 34 games, including 14 runs, 11 runs batted in, three doubles, one triple, and a .324 on-base percentage. He made 32 appearances, at first base (15), third base (10) and left field (7).

Cash died in Tampa, Florida, at the age of 59. He was the uncle of Tampa Bay Rays manager, Kevin Cash.
