= Gene Ammann =

American baseball player

- Pitcher
- Born: January 30, 1949 (age 77); New York City, New York, U.S.
- Batted: Right Threw: Right

NPB debut
- May 11, 1974, for the Hankyu Braves

Last NPB appearance
- May 11, 1974, for the Hankyu Braves

NPB statistics
- Win–loss record: 0–0
- Earned run average: 3.00
- Innings pitched: 3
- Strikeouts: 1
- Stats at Baseball Reference

Teams
- Hankyu Braves (1974)

Eugene George Ammann, Jr. (born January 30, 1949) was an American pitcher who is most notable for winning the 1970 College World Series Most Outstanding Player award while a junior at Florida State University (FSU). He is one of two players from Florida State University to win that award. The other is Marshall McDougall.

In 1968, he went 5-0 with a 2.17 ERA. He went 11-2 with a 2.09 ERA in 1969. His 1970 collegiate was perhaps one of the best ever in NCAA history. He won 15 games and lost none for a record of 15-0, and his ERA was 0.66, the lowest all-time in a single season. He had a string of 41 1/3 scoreless innings, and another string of 29 scoreless innings. Furthermore, he also holds the record for most shutouts in a season, with eight. At one point, he threw a no-hitter. He also holds the record for lowest ERA in a career, posting a career 1.45 ERA while attending FSU. Overall, his career record at FSU was 31-2.

Prior to pitching collegiately, he attended Lakeside High School.

Ammann was drafted twice. The first time, he was drafted by the Baltimore Orioles in the 55th round of the 1967 draft. He chose not to sign. After being drafted by the Milwaukee Brewers in the third round of the 1970 draft, he did sign. He played professionally for five seasons, never reaching the majors.

In his first professional season (1970), he played for the Jacksonville Suns, going 1-5 with a 2.85 ERA in 11 games. From 1971 to 1973, he played for the Evansville Triplets. In 1971, he went 6-10 with a 3.79 ERA in 25 games. In 1972, he went 9-10 with a 3.92 ERA in 30 games. Finally, in 1973, he went 8-8 with a 5.68 ERA in 26 games. In 1974, he played for the Hankyu Braves in Japan. He appeared in only one game, after which he was released; a report noted a lack of a fastball as the reason for his lack of success.

In 1991, he was inducted into the FSU Sports Hall of Fame.
