= 1957 College Baseball All-America Team =

List of baseball players

This is a list of college baseball players named first team All-Americans for the 1957 NCAA University Division baseball season. From 1947 to 1963, the American Baseball Coaches Association was the only generally recognized All-America selector, so any player selected by the ABCA is considered a "consensus" All-American.

== Key ==
A	American Baseball Coaches Association
	Member of the National College Baseball Hall of Fame
	Consensus All-American – selected the ABCA

== All-Americans ==
Position	Name	School	#	A
Pitcher	Ed Drapcho	Penn State	1	✓
Pitcher	Doug Weiss	California	1	✓
Catcher	Elmer Kohorst	Notre Dame	1	✓
First baseman	Fred Frickie	Alabama	1	✓
Second baseman	Ken Tippery	Michigan	1	✓
Shortstop	Dick Howser	Florida State	1	✓
Third baseman	Marsh McLean	Amherst	1	✓
Outfielder	Tom Clarkson	Arizona	1	✓
Outfielder	Jack Davis	Missouri	1	✓
Outfielder	Bill Olson	USC	1	✓

== See also ==
- List of college baseball awards
