= 1957 NCAA University Division baseball season =

Baseball season

- Number of teams: 166

NCAA tournament

College World Series
- Champions: California (2nd title)
- Runners-up: Penn State (2nd CWS Appearance)
- Winning coach: George Wolfman (1st title)
- MOP: Cal Emery (Penn State)

Seasons
- ← 1956 1958 →

The 1957 NCAA University Division baseball season, play of college baseball in the United States organized by the National Collegiate Athletic Association (NCAA) began in the spring of 1957. The season progressed through the regular season and concluded with the 1957 College World Series. The College World Series, held for the eleventh time in 1957, consisted of one team from each of eight geographical districts and was held in Omaha, Nebraska, at Johnny Rosenblatt Stadium as a double-elimination tournament. California claimed the championship.

== Realignment ==
Prior to the 1957 baseball season, the NCAA divided into two divisions: the University Division for larger schools and the College Division for smaller schools.

== Conference winners ==
This is a partial list of conference champions from the 1957 season. Each of the eight geographical districts chose, by various methods, the team that would represent them in the NCAA tournament. 12 teams earned automatic bids by winning their conference championship while 11 teams earned at-large selections.

Conference	Regular season winner
Atlantic Coast Conference	Duke
Big Seven Conference	Iowa State
Big Ten Conference	Northwestern
CIBA	California; Southern California
EIBL	Yale
FIC	Florida State
Mid-American Conference	Western Michigan
Pacific Coast Conference	Oregon
Rocky Mountain Conference	Colorado State
Southeastern Conference	Georgia Tech
Southern Conference	George Washington
Southwest Conference	Texas
Yankee Conference	UMass

== Conference standings ==
The following is an incomplete list of conference standings:

1957 Big Seven Conference baseball standings
	Conf.				Overall
Team	W		L	PCT	W		L	PCT
Iowa State ‍†‍‍^{y}	11	–	6	.647	18	–	9	.667
Oklahoma ‍‍‍	9	–	6	.600	10	–	8	.556
Missouri ‍‍‍	10	–	7	.588	13	–	7	.650
Kansas ‍‍‍	9	–	8	.529	11	–	11	.500
Nebraska ‍‍‍	8	–	9	.471	12	–	10	.545
Kansas State ‍‍‍	5	–	10	.333	7	–	10	.412
Colorado ‍‍‍	5	–	11	.313	10	–	11	.476
† – Conference champion y – Invited to the NCAA tournament As of June 30, 1957; Rankings from Collegiate Baseball

1957 Big Ten Conference baseball standings
	Conf.						Overall
Team	W		L		T	PCT	W		L		T	PCT
Northwestern ‍†‍‍^{y}	5	–	2	–	0	.714	15	–	6	–	0	.714
Iowa ‍‍‍	7	–	4	–	0	.636	9	–	10	–	0	.474
Michigan ‍‍‍	7	–	4	–	0	.636	17	–	7	–	0	.708
Illinois ‍‍‍	7	–	4	–	0	.636	17	–	9	–	0	.654
Minnesota ‍‍‍	6	–	5	–	0	.545	16	–	8	–	2	.654
Purdue ‍‍‍	3	–	3	–	0	.500	9	–	5	–	1	.633
Michigan State ‍‍‍	5	–	6	–	0	.455	18	–	13	–	1	.578
Ohio State ‍‍‍	4	–	5	–	0	.444	15	–	6	–	1	.705
Wisconsin ‍‍‍	3	–	7	–	0	.300	14	–	9	–	0	.609
Indiana ‍‍‍	3	–	10	–	0	.231	13	–	15	–	0	.464
† – Conference champion y – Invited to the NCAA tournament As of June 30, 1957; Rankings from Collegiate Baseball

1957 Eastern Intercollegiate Baseball League baseball standings
	Conf.						Overall
Team	W		L		T	PCT	W		L		T	PCT
Yale ‍†‍‍	7	–	1	–	1	.833	13	–	21	–	1	.386
Dartmouth ‍‍‍	5	–	2	–	0	.714	11	–	7	–	0	.611
Columbia ‍‍‍	5	–	2	–	0	.714	7	–	7	–	0	.500
Harvard ‍‍‍	6	–	3	–	0	.667	15	–	7	–	1	.674
Navy ‍‍‍	6	–	3	–	0	.667	16	–	6	–	1	.717
Army ‍‍‍	5	–	4	–	0	.556	13	–	9	–	2	.583
Brown ‍‍‍	3	–	6	–	0	.333	7	–	8	–	0	.467
Princeton ‍‍‍	2	–	6	–	1	.278	12	–	10	–	1	.543
Cornell ‍‍‍	1	–	7	–	0	.125	7	–	8	–	0	.467
Penn ‍‍‍	1	–	7	–	0	.125	7	–	16	–	0	.304
† – Conference champion

1957 Florida Intercollegiate Conference baseball standings
	Conf.				Overall
Team	W		L	PCT	W		L	PCT
Florida State ‍†‍‍^{y}	7	–	2	.778	22	–	9	.710
Miami (FL) ‍‍‍	7	–	6	.538	11	–	12	.478
Stetson ‍‍‍	5	–	9	.357	7	–	17	.292
Rollins ‍‍‍		–		–	14	–	13	.519
Florida Southern ‍‍‍		–		–	7	–	12	.368
Tampa ‍‍‍		–		–		–		–
† – Conference champion y – Invited to the NCAA tournament As of June 30, 1957; Rankings from Collegiate Baseball

1957 Pacific Coast Conference baseball standings
	Conf.				Overall
Team	W		L	PCT	W		L	PCT
North Division
Oregon ‍†‍‍	11	–	3	.786		–		–
Oregon State ‍‍‍	8	–	7	.533	18	–	13	.581
Washington ‍‍‍	8	–	8	.500	20	–	11	.645
Idaho ‍‍‍	5	–	8	.385		–		–
Washington State ‍‍‍	5	–	11	.313	14	–	21	.400
California Intercollegiate Baseball Association
California ‍†‍‍^{y}	12	–	4	.750	35	–	10	.778
Southern California ‍‍‍	12	–	4	.750	18	–	4	.818
Stanford ‍‍‍	7	–	9	.438	17	–	13	.567
UCLA ‍‍‍	5	–	9	.357	15	–	15	.500
Santa Clara ‍‍‍	2	–	12	.143		–		–
† – Conference champion y – Invited to the NCAA tournament

1957 Southwest Conference baseball standings
	Conf.				Overall
Team	W		L	PCT	W		L	PCT
Texas ‍†‍‍^{y}	12	–	1	.923	20	–	7	.741
TCU ‍‍‍	8	–	4	.667	8	–	4	.667
SMU ‍‍‍	6	–	7	.462	11	–	10	.524
Baylor ‍‍‍	4	–	7	.364	10	–	11	.476
Rice ‍‍‍	5	–	10	.333	9	–	12	.429
Texas A&M ‍‍‍	4	–	10	.286	5	–	15	.250
† – Conference champion y – Invited to the NCAA tournament As of June 30, 1957; Rankings from Collegiate Baseball

1957 Yankee Conference baseball standings
	Conf.						Overall
Team	W		L		T	PCT	W		L		T	PCT
UMass ‍†‍‍	6	–	2	–	0	.750	11	–	9	–	0	.550
Connecticut ‍‍‍^{y}	4	–	4	–	0	.500	14	–	10	–	0	.583
New Hampshire ‍‍‍	4	–	4	–	0	.500	5	–	11	–	0	.313
Maine ‍‍‍	3	–	5	–	0	.375	6	–	14	–	0	.300
Rhode Island ‍‍‍	3	–	5	–	0	.375	7	–	9	–	1	.441
Vermont ‍‍‍	0	–	0	–	0	–	15	–	7	–	0	.682
† – Conference champion y – Invited to the NCAA tournament As of June 30, 1957; Rankings from Collegiate Baseball

== College World Series ==
The 1957 season marked the eleventh NCAA Baseball Tournament, which culminated with the eight team College World Series. The College World Series was held in Omaha, Nebraska. The eight teams played a double-elimination format, with California claiming their second championship with a 1–0 win over Penn State in the final.

Upper round 1
Texas	3
Connecticut	0
Penn State	7
Florida State	0
California	4
Colorado State College	0
Iowa State	13^{10}
Notre Dame	8

Upper round 2
Texas	1
Penn State	4
California	8
Iowa State	2
Lower round 1
Connecticut	5
Florida State	3
Colorado State College	2
Notre Dame	23

Upper final
Penn State	0
California	8
Lower round 2
Iowa State	5
Connecticut	2
Texas	0
Notre Dame	9

Semifinals
California	9
Iowa State	1
Penn State	5
Notre Dame	4

Final
California	1
Penn State	0
