= 1957 Colorado State Bears baseball team =

American college baseball season

1957 Northern Colorado Bears baseball

Rocky Mountain Conference champions District VII playoff champions

College World Series, T-7th
- Conference: Rocky Mountain Conference
- Record: 24–5 (– RMC)
- Head coach: Pete Butler (15th season)
- Home stadium: Jackson Field

The 1957 Northern Colorado Bears baseball team represented Colorado State College in the 1957 NCAA University Division baseball season. The Bears played their home games at Jackson Field. The team was coached by Pete Butler in his 15th year at Northern Colorado.

The Bears won the District VII playoff to advance to the College World Series, where they were defeated by the Arizona Wildcats.

== Roster ==
1957 Colorado State Bears baseball team
Players
Coaches

#	Pos.	Name	B/T	Height	Weight	Year	Home town
		Ken Berger	/	—	—
	RHP	Gayle Bernhardt	/R	—	—
		Fred Boom	/	—	—
	OF	Irv Brown	/	—	—		Denver, Colorado
	INF	Wayne Coates	/	—	—
		Delbert Davies	/	—	—
		Fred Diehl	/	—	—
		Joe Duca	/	—	—
	LHP	Joe Edson	/L	—	—
		Don Gentry	/R	—	—
		Jim Graff	/	—	—
		Art Griffin	/	—	—
	RHP	John Hogg	/R	—	—
		Tom Jenkins	/	—	—
		Ken Kempf	/	—	—
		Larry Klumb	/	—	—
		Jack McColl	/	—	—
		Bill Oster	/	—	—
		Joe Peck	/	—	—
32	OF	Del Peterson	/	—	—
		Don Stern	/	—	—
		Willie Wright	/R	—	—

Head coach

Pete Butler

Assistant coach(es)

Legend

- (C) Team captain
- (S) Suspended
- (I) Ineligible
- Injured
- Current redshirt

== Schedule ==
1957 Northern Colorado Bears baseball game log
Regular season
April (0–0)

#	Date	Opponent	Site/stadium	Score	Overall record	RMC record

May (0–0)

#	Date	Opponent	Site/stadium	Score	Overall record	RMC record
	May 22	at Air Force	Falcon Baseball Field • Colorado Springs, Colorado	13–3	–	–
	May 25	Air Force	Jackson Field • Greeley, Colorado	8–6	–	–
	May 25	Air Force	Jackson Field • Greeley, Colorado	5–11	–	–

Postseason
District VII Playoff (2–1)

#	Date	Opponent	Site/stadium	Score	Overall record	RMC record
28	June 1	Denver	Jackson Field • Greeley, Colorado	8–3	23–5	–
29	June 1	Denver	Jackson Field • Greeley, Colorado	3–4	23–6	–
30	June 3	at Denver	Unknown • Denver, Colorado	5–3	24–6	–

College World Series (0–2)

#	Date	Opponent	Site/stadium	Score	Overall record	RMC record
31	June 8	vs California	Omaha Municipal Stadium • Omaha, Nebraska	0–4	24–7	–
32	June 9	vs Notre Dame	Omaha Municipal Stadium • Omaha, Nebraska	2–23	24–8	–
