= 1957 Notre Dame Fighting Irish baseball team =

American college baseball season

1957 Notre Dame Fighting Irish baseball

District IV Playoff

College World Series, 4th
- Conference: Independent
- Record: 16–10
- Head coach: Jake Kline (24th season)
- Captains: Jim Cusack; Elmer Kohorst
- Home stadium: Cartier Field

The 1957 Notre Dame Fighting Irish baseball team represented the University of Notre Dame in the 1957 NCAA University Division baseball season. The Fighting Irish played their home games at Cartier Field. The team was coached by Jake Kline who was in his 24th year as head coach at Notre Dame that time.

The Fighting Irish won the District IV playoff to advance to the College World Series, but later on they were defeated by the Penn State Nittany Lions.

== Roster ==
1957 Notre Dame Fighting Irish baseball team
Players
Coaches

#	Pos.	Name	B/T	Height	Weight	Year	Home town
11	RHP	Tom Bujnowski	/R	5 ft 11 in (1.8 m)	170 lb (77 kg)	Sr	Bayonne, New Jersey
14	INF	Jim Carideo	/	5 ft 7 in (1.7 m)	165 lb (75 kg)	Sr	Mount Vernon, New York
30	RHP	John Connors	/R	6 ft 1 in (1.85 m)	185 lb (84 kg)		LaGrange, Illinois
26	INF	Jim Cusack (C)	/	6 ft 1 in (1.85 m)	185 lb (84 kg)	Sr	Peoria, Illinois
12	OF	Gene Duffy	/	5 ft 6 in (1.68 m)	155 lb (70 kg)	So	Davenport, Iowa
15	OF	Bob Giarrantano	/	5 ft 11 in (1.8 m)	165 lb (75 kg)		Great Neck, New York
23	INF	Eddie Hurley	/	6 ft 0 in (1.83 m)	170 lb (77 kg)	Sr	Holyoke, Massachusetts
	INF	Steven Johnson	/	5 ft 10 in (1.78 m)	160 lb (73 kg)		Robbinsdale, Minnesota
33	C	Elmer Kohorst (C)	/	6 ft 2 in (1.88 m)	190 lb (86 kg)	Sr	Albany, Minnesota
32	INF	Jim Morris	/	6 ft 3 in (1.91 m)	180 lb (82 kg)	Jr	Quincy, Illinois
26	OF	Bob Senecal	/	6 ft 0 in (1.83 m)	185 lb (84 kg)	Jr	Newaygo, Michigan
16	OF	Paul Sopko	/	5 ft 10 in (1.78 m)	175 lb (79 kg)		Columbus, Ohio
29	RHP	Chuck Symeon	/R	6 ft 0 in (1.83 m)	180 lb (82 kg)	Jr	Stamford, Connecticut

Head coach

Jake Kline

Assistant coach(es)

Legend

- (C) Team captain
- (S) Suspended
- (I) Ineligible
- Injured
- Current redshirt

== Schedule ==
1957 Notre Dame Fighting Irish baseball game log
Regular season
April (4–5)

#	Date	Opponent	Site/stadium	Score	Overall record
1	April 12	at Indiana	Jordan Field • Bloomington, Indiana	6–1	1–0
2	April 13	at Indiana	Jordan Field • Bloomington, Indiana	9–7	2–0
3	April 13	at Indiana	Jordan Field • Bloomington, Indiana	0–3	2–1
4	April 16	Central Michigan	Cartier Field • Notre Dame, Indiana	3–2	3–1
5	April 20	at Michigan	Ray Fisher Stadium • Ann Arbor, Michigan	4–5	3–2
6	April 20	at Michigan	Ray Fisher Stadium • Ann Arbor, Michigan	0–3	3–3
7	April 26	at Ohio	Unknown • Athens, Ohio	8–3	4–3
8	April 27	at Ohio	Unknown • Athens, Ohio	4–7	4–4
9	April 30	Michigan State	Cartier Field • Notre Dame, Indiana	3–4	4–5

May (7–1)

#	Date	Opponent	Site/stadium	Score	Overall record
10	May 1	at Northwestern	Dyche Field • Evanston, Illinois	8–4	5–5
11	May 4	Glenview Naval Air Station	Cartier Field • Notre Dame, Indiana	12–1	6–5
12	May 6	Wisconsin	Cartier Field • Notre Dame, Indiana	4–1	7–5
13	May 7	Wisconsin	Cartier Field • Notre Dame, Indiana	9–14	7–6
14	May 9	Michigan	Cartier Field • Notre Dame, Indiana	14–0	8–6
15	May 11	Great Lakes Naval Air Station	Cartier Field • Notre Dame, Indiana	9–0	9–6
16	May 13	at Michigan State	Old College Field • East Lansing, Michigan	3–1	10–6
17	May 15	Northwestern	Cartier Field • Notre Dame, Indiana	6–2	11–6

Postseason
NCAA District V Playoff (3–1)

#	Date	Opponent	Site/stadium	Score	Overall record
18	May 28	vs Alma	Hyames Field • Kalamazoo, Michigan	18–2	12–6
19	May 29	at Western Michigan	Hyames Field • Kalamazoo, Michigan	4–2	13–6
20	May 30	vs Northwestern	Hyames Field • Kalamazoo, Michigan	2–9	13–7
21	May 31	vs Northwestern	Hyames Field • Kalamazoo, Michigan	6–1	14–7

June (0–1)

#	Date	Opponent	Site/stadium	Score	Overall record
22	June 2	at Western Michigan	Hyames Field • Kalamazoo, Michigan	2–4	14–8

College World Series (2–2)

#	Date	Opponent	Site/stadium	Score	Overall record
23	June 8	vs Iowa State	Omaha Municipal Stadium • Omaha, Nebraska	8–13	14–9
24	June 9	vs Colorado State	Omaha Municipal Stadium • Omaha, Nebraska	23–2	15–9
25	June 10	vs Texas	Omaha Municipal Stadium • Omaha, Nebraska	9–0	16–9
26	June 11	vs Penn State	Omaha Municipal Stadium • Omaha, Nebraska	4–5	16–10

== Awards and honors ==
Elmer Kohorst

- First Team All-American American Baseball Coaches Association
