= 1957 Northwestern Wildcats baseball team =

American college baseball season

1957 Northwestern Wildcats baseball

Big Ten Conference

District IV tournament, Lost
- Conference: Big Ten Conference
- Record: 15–6 (5–2 Big Ten)
- Head coach: Fred Lindstrom (9th season)
- Captain: Ed Broeker
- Home stadium: Northwestern Park

1957 Big Ten Conference baseball standings
	Conf.						Overall
Team	W		L		T	PCT	W		L		T	PCT
Northwestern ‍†‍‍^{y}	5	–	2	–	0	.714	15	–	6	–	0	.714
Iowa ‍‍‍	7	–	4	–	0	.636	9	–	10	–	0	.474
Michigan ‍‍‍	7	–	4	–	0	.636	17	–	7	–	0	.708
Illinois ‍‍‍	7	–	4	–	0	.636	17	–	9	–	0	.654
Minnesota ‍‍‍	6	–	5	–	0	.545	16	–	8	–	2	.654
Purdue ‍‍‍	3	–	3	–	0	.500	9	–	5	–	1	.633
Michigan State ‍‍‍	5	–	6	–	0	.455	18	–	13	–	1	.578
Ohio State ‍‍‍	4	–	5	–	0	.444	15	–	6	–	1	.705
Wisconsin ‍‍‍	3	–	7	–	0	.300	14	–	9	–	0	.609
Indiana ‍‍‍	3	–	10	–	0	.231	13	–	15	–	0	.464
† – Conference champion y – Invited to the NCAA tournament As of June 30, 1957; Rankings from Collegiate Baseball

The 1957 Northwestern Wildcats baseball team represented Northwestern University in the 1957 NCAA University Division baseball season. The head coach was Fred Lindstrom, serving his 9th year. The Wildcats finished the season with a loss in the District IV Tournament Final.

== Roster ==
1957 Northwestern Wildcats baseball team
Players
Coaches

#	Pos.	Name	B/T	Height	Weight	Year	Home town
	INF	Gary Bialk	/	—	—
	OF	Ken Bindner	/	—	—	Sr
	INF	Ed Broeker	/	—	—
	OF	Mike Collopy	/	—	—	So
		Cooper	/	—	—
	LHP	Dave Hill	R/L	6 ft 2 in (1.88 m)	170 lb (77 kg)		New Orleans, Louisiana
	RHP	Jay Hook	L/R	6 ft 2 in (1.88 m)	182 lb (83 kg)		Waukegan, Illinois
	INF	Al Kennedy	/	—	—
	INF	Bob Lietzow	/	—	—	So
	C	Chuck Lindstrom	R/R	5 ft 11 in (1.8 m)	175 lb (79 kg)	Sr	Chicago, Illinois
	C	Tom Meyer	/	—	—	So
	P	Nelson Nedde	/	—	—
	P	Allan Otto	/	—	—
		Dale Pienta	/	—	—
	LHP	Tom Scheuerman	/L	—	—	Jr
	INF	Ron Smith	/	—	—
	INF	Harry Stranski	/	—	—

Head coach

Fred Lindstrom

Assistant coach(es)

Legend

- (C) Team captain
- (S) Suspended
- (I) Ineligible
- Injured
- Current redshirt

== Schedule ==
1957 Northwestern Wildcats baseball game log
Regular season
April (3–0)

#	Date	Opponent	Site/stadium	Score	Overall record	Big Ten record
7	April	UIC	Dyche Field • Evanston, Illinois	18–2	–	0–0
	April	Great Lakes	Dyche Field • Evanston, Illinois	–	–	0–0
	April	Great Lakes	Dyche Field • Evanston, Illinois	–	–	0–0

May (6–4)

#	Date	Opponent	Site/stadium	Score	Overall record	Big Ten record
	May 1	Notre Dame	Dyche Field • Evanston, Illinois	4–8	–1	0–0
	May	Glenview Air Base	Dyche Field • Evanston, Illinois	26–0	–1	0–0
	May 3	at Michigan State	John Kobs Field • East Lansing, Michigan	7–2	–2	1–1
	May 4	at Michigan	Ray Fisher Stadium • Ann Arbor, Michigan	3–10	–2	1–1
	May 4	at Michigan	Ray Fisher Stadium • Ann Arbor, Michigan	5–12	–3	1–2
	May 11	vs Indiana	Unknown • Unknown	4–0	–3	2–2
	May 11	vs Indiana	Unknown • Unknown	12–1	–3	3–2
	May 15	at Notre Dame	Unknown • Notre Dame, Indiana	4–8	–4	3–2
	May	Wisconsin	Dyche Field • Evanston, Illinois	–	–	4–2
	May 24	at Illinois	Illinois Field • Champaign, Illinois	1–0	12–4	5–2

Postseason
District IV Tournament (3–2)

#	Date	Opponent	Site/stadium	Score	Overall record	Big Ten record
17	May 28	at Western Michigan	Hyames Field • Kalamazoo, Michigan	1–11	12–5	5–2
18	May 29	vs Alma	Hyames Field • Kalamazoo, Michigan	11–2	13–5	5–2
19	May 29	at Western Michigan	Hyames Field • Kalamazoo, Michigan	10–9	14–5	5–2
20	May 30	vs Notre Dame	Hyames Field • Kalamazoo, Michigan	9–2	15–5	5–2
21	May 31	vs Notre Dame	Hyames Field • Kalamazoo, Michigan	1–6	15–6	5–2

== Awards and honors ==
Ed Broeker

- First Team All-Big Ten

Al Kennedy

- Second Team All-Big Ten

Chuck Lindstrom

- Second Team All-Big Ten

Tom Scheuerman

- First Team All-Big TenThe following is a listing of the selections listed in the 2018 Northwestern Baseball Media Guide on nusports.com.
