= Mike Gambino =

American baseball coach

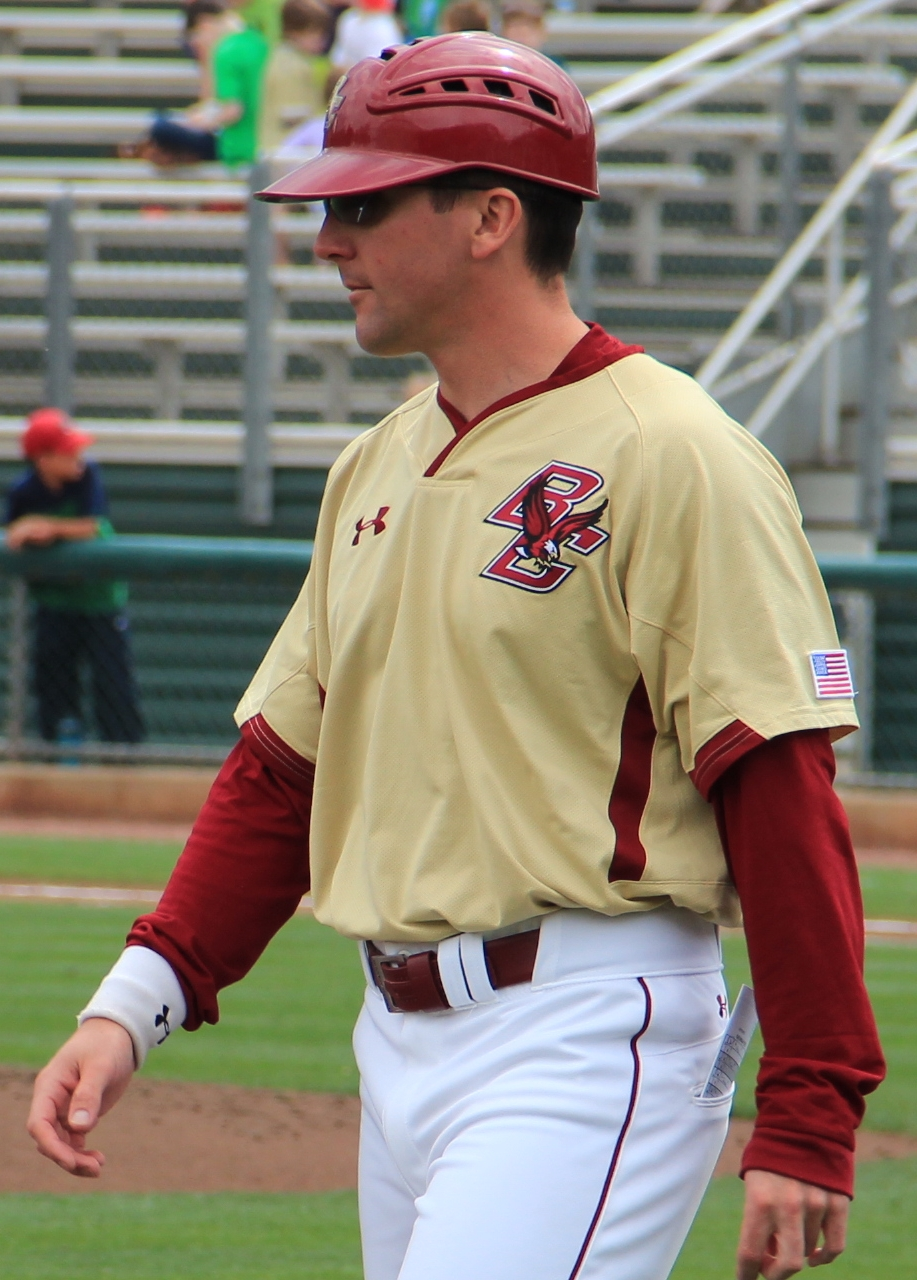
- Gambino in 2013

Current position
- Title: Head coach
- Team: Penn State
- Conference: Big Ten
- Record: 65–53 (.551)

Biographical details
- Born: July 9, 1977 (age 49); Cold Spring, New York, U.S.

Playing career
- 1997–2000: Boston College
- 2000: Gulf Coast League Red Sox
- 2000: Augusta Greenjackets
- 2001: Lowell Spinners
- 2001: Augusta Greenjackets
- Position: IF

Coaching career (HC unless noted)
- 2003–2005: Boston College (Asst.)
- 2007–2010: Virginia Tech (Asst.)
- 2011–2023: Boston College
- 2024–present: Penn State

Head coaching record
- Overall: 356–419 (.459)
- Tournaments: NCAA: 6–4 (.600)

Michael L. Gambino (born July 9, 1977) is an American baseball coach and former infielder, who is the current head baseball coach of the Penn State Nittany Lions. Prior to accepting the head coaching position at Penn State, he served as an assistant and head coach at Boston College, a position he held for 12 years. He scouted for the Detroit Tigers, and served as an assistant at Virginia Tech.

Gambino played college baseball at Boston College from 1997–2000. In 1998, he played collegiate summer baseball for the Orleans Cardinals of the Cape Cod Baseball League. In June 2000, he signed as an undrafted free agent with the Boston Red Sox and played two seasons of minor league baseball in their system.

== Head coaching record ==
Below is a table of Gambino's yearly records as an NCAA head baseball coach.

Record table
Season	Team	Overall	Conference	Standing	Postseason
Boston College Eagles (Atlantic Coast Conference) (2011–2023)
2011	Boston College	17–33	7–22	5th (Atlantic)	
2012	Boston College	22–33	10–20	T–5th (Atlantic)	
2013	Boston College	12–40	4–25	6th (Atlantic)	
2014	Boston College	22–33	10–20	6th (Atlantic)	
2015	Boston College	27–27	10–19	7th (Atlantic)	
2016	Boston College	35–22	13–15	5th (Atlantic)	NCAA Super Regional
2017	Boston College	25–28	11–19	6th (Atlantic)	
2018	Boston College	17–32	7–22	7th (Atlantic)	
2019	Boston College	31–27	12–18	7th (Atlantic)	
2020	Boston College	6–9	0–3	7th (Atlantic)	Season canceled due to COVID-19
2021	Boston College	21–28	10–23	7th (Atlantic)	
2022	Boston College	19–34	5–25	7th (Atlantic)	
2023	Boston College	37–20	16–14	3rd (Atlantic)	NCAA regional
Boston College:		291–366 (.443)	115–245 (.319)		
Penn State Nittany Lions (Big Ten Conference) (2024–present)
2024	Penn State	29–24	12–12	T–7th	Big Ten Tournament Runner-Up
2025	Penn State	33–23	15–15	T–8th	Big Ten Tournament Semi-Finals
2026	Penn State	16–35	9–21	T–14th	
Penn State:		78–82 (.488)	36–48 (.429)		
Total:		369–448 (.452)			
National champion Postseason invitational champion Conference regular season champion Conference regular season and conference tournament champion Division regular season champion Division regular season and conference tournament champion Conference tournament champion
