= Earl Robinson (disambiguation) =

Earl Robinson (1910–1991) was an American singer-songwriter and composer

Earl Robinson is also the name of:

- Earl Robinson (ice hockey) (1907–1986), Canadian hockey player
- Earl Robinson (baseball) (1936–2014), Major League Baseball outfielder
