= 1957 NAIA World Series =

1957 NAIA baseball tournament
- 1957 NAIA World Series
- Teams: 8
- Format: Single elimination, with consolation bracket
- Finals site: Kokernot Field; Alpine, Texas
- Champions: Sul Ross State (1st title)
- MVP: Frank Willis (Rollins)

The 1957 NAIA World Series was the inaugural edition of the annual tournament hosted by the National Association of Intercollegiate Athletics to determine the national champion of baseball among its member colleges and universities in the United States and Canada.

The tournament was played at Kokernot Field in Alpine, Texas, near the campus of Sul Ross State College.

Sul Ross State defeated Rollins in the championship game, 8–7, to win the inaugural NAIA World Series. Rollins player Frank Willis, however, was named tournament MVP.

The tournament featured eight teams in a single-elimination style tournament, with all first-round losers shifted into a secondary consolation bracket.

== Bracket ==
Fifth place
Lincoln Memorial	5
Southwestern State	9

Consolation semifinals
William Jewell	8
Lincoln Memorial	11
Southwestern State	3
Ozarks	0

First round
Sul Ross State	9
William Jewell	2
Buena Vista	9
Lincoln Memorial	8
Western Illinois State	13
Southwestern State (OK)	12
Rollins	9
Ozarks	7

Semifinals
Sul Ross State	8
Buena Vista	6
Western Illinois State	4
Rollins	7

Final
Sul Ross State	8
Rollins	7
Third place
Buena Vista	6
Western Illinois State	14

== See also ==
- 1957 NCAA University Division baseball tournament
