= 1957 Iowa State Cyclones baseball team =

American college baseball season

1957 Iowa State Cyclones baseball

District V Playoff Big Seven Champions

College World Series, 3rd
- Conference: Big Seven Conference
- Record: 18–9 (11–6 Big 7)
- Head coach: Cap Timm (16th season)
- Captain: Dan Peters

1957 Big Seven Conference baseball standings
	Conf.				Overall
Team	W		L	PCT	W		L	PCT
Iowa State ‍†‍‍^{y}	11	–	6	.647	18	–	9	.667
Oklahoma ‍‍‍	9	–	6	.600	10	–	8	.556
Missouri ‍‍‍	10	–	7	.588	13	–	7	.650
Kansas ‍‍‍	9	–	8	.529	11	–	11	.500
Nebraska ‍‍‍	8	–	9	.471	12	–	10	.545
Kansas State ‍‍‍	5	–	10	.333	7	–	10	.412
Colorado ‍‍‍	5	–	11	.313	10	–	11	.476
† – Conference champion y – Invited to the NCAA tournament As of June 30, 1957; Rankings from Collegiate Baseball

The 1957 Iowa State Cyclones baseball team represented Iowa State University in the 1957 NCAA University Division baseball season. The team was coached by Cap Timm in his 16th year as head coach at Iowa State.

The Cyclones won the District V playoff to advance to the College World Series, where they were defeated by the California Golden Bears.

== Roster ==
1957 Iowa State Cyclones baseball team
Players
Coaches

#	Pos.	Name	B/T	Height	Weight	Year	Home town
		Baukol	/	—	—
	C	Dick Bertell	R/R	—	—	Sr	Oak Park, Illinois
		Borth	/	—	—
		Bridgman	/	—	—
		Brink	/R	—	—
		Carstens	/	—	—
		Chapman	/	—	—
		Chapin	/	—	—
		Downs	/	—	—
		Drum	/L	—	—
	RHP	Paul Groth	/R	—	—
		Halsne	/	—	—
		Harden	/	—	—
		Howard	/	—	—
		Ingram	/	—	—
		Jacobs	/	—	—
		Jesiger	/	—	—
	P	Jim Kudlinski	/	—	—	So
	P	Gene Lafferty	/	—	—
		Lamont	/	—	—
		Lyons	/	—	—
	INF	Jerry McNertney	R/R	—	—	Jr	Boone, Iowa
		Olmstead	/	—	—
		O'Neil	/	—	—
		Dan Peters (C)	/L	—	—
		Taylor	/	—	—
	INF	Gary Thompson	/	—	—	Sr
		Weise	/	—	—

Head coach

Cap Timm

Assistant coach(es)

Legend

- (C) Team captain
- (S) Suspended
- (I) Ineligible
- Injured
- Current redshirt

== Schedule ==
1957 Iowa State Cyclones baseball game log
Regular season
April (6–4)

#	Date	Opponent	Site/stadium	Score	Overall record	Big 7 record
1	April 6	vs Iowa State Teachers	Unknown • Unknown	11–0	1–0	–
2	April 6	vs Iowa State Teachers	Unknown • Unknown	13–2	2–0	–
3	April 13	vs Minnesota	Unknown • Unknown	14–10	3–0	–
4	April 13	vs Minnesota	Unknown • Unknown	10–11	3–1	–
5	April 19	Missouri	Unknown • Ames, Iowa	14–9	4–1	1–0
6	April 20	Missouri	Unknown • Ames, Iowa	6–5	5–1	2–0
7	April 20	Missouri	Unknown • Ames, Iowa	3–7	5–2	2–1
8	April 26	at Nebraska	Husker Diamond • Lincoln, Nebraska	5–0	6–2	3–1
9	April 27	at Nebraska	Husker Diamond • Lincoln, Nebraska	5–10	6–3	3–2
10	April 27	at Nebraska	Husker Diamond • Lincoln, Nebraska	3–4	6–4	3–3

May (8–3)

#	Date	Opponent	Site/stadium	Score	Overall record	Big 7 record
11	May 4	Oklahoma	Unknown • Ames, Iowa	7–1	7–4	4–3
12	May 5	Oklahoma	Unknown • Ames, Iowa	4–6	7–5	4–4
13	May 5	Oklahoma	Unknown • Ames, Iowa	3–2	8–5	5–4
14	May 11	at Kansas State	Unknown • Manhattan, Kansas	13–2	9–5	6–4
15	May 11	at Kansas State	Unknown • Manhattan, Kansas	12–7	10–5	7–4
16	May 17	Kansas	Unknown • Ames, Iowa	7–2	11–5	8–4
17	May 18	Kansas	Unknown • Ames, Iowa	12–0	12–5	9–4
18	May 18	Kansas	Unknown • Ames, Iowa	4–0	13–5	10–4
19	May 24	at Colorado	Unknown • Boulder, Colorado	13–4	14–5	11–4
20	May 25	at Colorado	Unknown • Boulder, Colorado	7–8	14–6	11–5
21	May 25	at Colorado	Unknown • Boulder, Colorado	10–12	14–7	11–6

Postseason
NCAA District V Playoff (2–0)

#	Date	Opponent	Site/stadium	Score	Overall record	Big 7 record
22	May 31	Bradley	Unknown • Ames, Iowa	2–0	15–7	11–6
23	June 1	Bradley	Unknown • Ames, Iowa	3–0	16–7	11–6

College World Series (2–2)

#	Date	Opponent	Site/stadium	Score	Overall record	Big 7 record
24	June 8	vs Notre Dame	Omaha Municipal Stadium • Omaha, Nebraska	13–8	17–7	11–6
25	June 9	vs California	Omaha Municipal Stadium • Omaha, Nebraska	2–8	17–8	11–6
26	June 10	vs Connecticut	Omaha Municipal Stadium • Omaha, Nebraska	5–2	18–8	11–6
27	June 11	vs California	Omaha Municipal Stadium • Omaha, Nebraska	1–9	18–9	11–6

== Awards and honors ==
Dick Bertell

- Second Team All-American Sports Illustrated

Gary Thompson

- Third Team All-American Sports Illustrated
