= 1957 Connecticut Huskies baseball team =

American college baseball season

1957 Connecticut Huskies baseball

NCAA District 1 playoff champion

College World Series, 1–2
- Conference: Yankee Conference
- Record: 14–10 (5–5 Yankee)
- Head coach: J. O. Christian (22nd season)
- Home stadium: Gardner Dow Athletic Fields

1957 Yankee Conference baseball standings
	Conf.						Overall
Team	W		L		T	PCT	W		L		T	PCT
Vermont ‍‍‍	5	–	1	–	0	.833	15	–	7	–	0	.682
UMass ‍†‍‍	6	–	4	–	0	.600	11	–	9	–	0	.550
Connecticut ‍‍‍^{y}	5	–	5	–	0	.500	14	–	10	–	0	.583
New Hampshire ‍‍‍	4	–	4	–	0	.500	5	–	11	–	0	.313
Maine ‍‍‍	3	–	5	–	0	.375	6	–	14	–	0	.300
Rhode Island ‍‍‍	3	–	7	–	0	.300	7	–	9	–	1	.441
† – Conference champion y – Invited to the NCAA tournament As of June 30, 1957; Rankings from Collegiate Baseball

The 1957 Connecticut Huskies baseball team represented the University of Connecticut in the 1957 NCAA University Division baseball season. The Huskies were led by J. O. Christian in his 22nd year as head coach, and played as part of the Yankee Conference. Connecticut posted a 14–10 record and earned an invitation to the 1957 NCAA University Division baseball tournament. They won the District 1 playoffs over Springfield two games to one to earn a berth in the College World Series, their first appearance in the ultimate college baseball event. The Huskies lost their first game against Texas, defeated Florida State and were eliminated by Iowa State.

== Roster ==
1957 Connecticut Huskies roster
- William Boehle; - Nicholas Briante; - Donald Burns; - Kenneth Collum; - Ronald Flydal; - Ray Froscio; - Leonard King; - James McMahon; - David Musco	Pitchers: - Ron Anastasio; - Bob Butterfield; - Bob Cohan; - Clayton Gery; - Don Poiro; - Bill Risley; - Bob Wedin; - Charley Wellard	Catchers: - Bob Baisden; Infielders Outfielders: - Moe Morhardt; - Bill Stevens

== Schedule ==
1957 Connecticut Huskies baseball game log
Regular season

April
Date	Opponent	Site/stadium	Score	Overall record	YC record
Apr 11	Northeastern*	Gardner Dow Athletic Fields • Storrs, CT	W 2–1	1–0	
Apr 13	Maine		L 4–6	1–1	0–1
Apr 16	UMass	Gardner Dow Athletic Fields • Storrs, CT	W 6–0	2–1	1–1
Apr 19	UMass	Amherst, MA	W 2–1	3–1	2–1
Apr 22	Wesleyan*		L 4–5	3–2	
Apr 25	Boston University*		W 2–0	4–2	
Apr 27	Vermont		W 9–4	5–2	3–1
Apr 27	Vermont		L 1–3	5–3	3–2
Apr 30	Yale*		W 8–3	6–3	

May
Date	Opponent	Site/stadium	Score	Overall record	YC record
May 2	Holy Cross*	Gardner Dow Athletic Fields • Storrs, CT	W 2–1	7–3	
May 6	Coast Guard*		W 8–6	8–3	
May 9	Rhode Island		W 20–6	9–3	4–2
May 11	New Hampshire	Gardner Dow Athletic Fields • Storrs, CT	L 1–2	9–4	4–3
May 11	New Hampshire	Gardner Dow Athletic Fields • Storrs, CT	L 3–6	9–5	4–4
May 13	American International*		L 5–6	9–6	
May 17	Springfield*		W 6–4	10–6	
May 18	Maine		W 2–0	11–6	5–4
May 21	Rhode Island		L 0–2	11–7	5–5

Postseason

District 1 playoffs
Date	Opponent	Site/stadium	Score	Overall record	NCAAT record
	Springfield		L 4–9	11–8	0–1
	Springfield		W 4–3	12–8	1–1
	Springfield		W 5–0	13–8	2–1

College World Series
Date	Opponent	Site/stadium	Score	Overall record	CWS record
June 8	Texas	Johnny Rosenblatt Stadium • Omaha, NE	L 0–3	13–9	0–1
June 9	Florida State	Johnny Rosenblatt Stadium • Omaha, NE	W 5–3	14–9	1–1
June 10	Iowa State	Johnny Rosenblatt Stadium • Omaha, NE	L 2–5	14–10	1–2
