= 1957 Texas Longhorns baseball team =

American college baseball season

1957 Texas Longhorns baseball

SWC champions

College World Series, 1–2
- Conference: Southwest Conference
- Record: 20–6 (12–1 SWC)
- Head coach: Bibb Falk (15th year)
- Home stadium: Clark Field

1957 Southwest Conference baseball standings
	Conf.				Overall
Team	W		L	PCT	W		L	PCT
Texas ‍†‍‍^{y}	12	–	1	.923	20	–	7	.741
TCU ‍‍‍	8	–	4	.667	8	–	4	.667
SMU ‍‍‍	6	–	7	.462	11	–	10	.524
Baylor ‍‍‍	4	–	7	.364	10	–	11	.476
Rice ‍‍‍	5	–	10	.333	9	–	12	.429
Texas A&M ‍‍‍	4	–	10	.286	5	–	15	.250
† – Conference champion y – Invited to the NCAA tournament As of June 30, 1957; Rankings from Collegiate Baseball

The 1957 Texas Longhorns baseball team represented the University of Texas at Austin in the 1957 NCAA University Division baseball season. The Longhorns played their home games at Clark Field. The team was coached by Bibb Falk in his 15th season at Texas.

The Longhorns reached the College World Series, but were eliminated by Notre Dame in the quarterfinal.

== Personnel ==
=== Roster ===
1957 Texas Longhorns roster
Pitchers Catchers	Infielders Outfielders	Unknown: - Richard Carrington; - Pete Embry; - George A. Gainley Jr.; - Clay R. Gault; - Johnny Harlod Lowry; - Roy Menge; - George E. Myers; - Howard Dean Reed; - Jesse L. Smith; - Raymond Stauffacher; - Robert B. Sudderth; - Harry Evans Taylor; - Glenn A. Van Rosenberg

=== Coaches ===
1957 Texas Longhorns baseball coaching staff
- Bibb Falk – Head coach – 15th year

== Schedule and results ==
Legend
Texas win
Texas loss

1957 Texas Longhorns baseball game log
Regular season

March
Date	Opponent	Site/stadium	Score	Overall record	SWC record
Mar 11	Sam Houston Teachers College*	Clark Field • Austin, TX	L 7–8	0–1	
Mar 12	Sam Houston Teachers College*	Clark Field • Austin, TX	W 10–3	1–1	
Mar 15	Oklahoma*	Clark Field • Austin, TX	W 12–2	2–1	
Mar 16	Oklahoma*	Clark Field • Austin, TX	L 0–4	2–2	
Mar 22	at Texas A&M	Kyle Baseball Field • College Station, TX	W 8–4	3–2	1–0
Mar 25	Minnesota*	Clark Field • Austin, TX	W 7–2	4–2	
Mar 26	Minnesota	Clark Field • Austin, TX	W 7–4	5–2	
Mar 29	SMU	Clark Field • Austin, TX	W 2–1^{11}	6–2	2–0
Mar 30	SMU	Clark Field • Austin, TX	W 7–6	7–2	3–0

April
Date	Opponent	Site/stadium	Score	Overall record	SWC record
Apr 9	Amarillo Gold Sox	Clark Field • Austin, TX	L 8–15	7–3	
Apr 12	Rice	Clark Field • Austin, TX	W 7–5	8–3	4–0
Apr 13	Rice	Clark Field • Austin, TX	W 22–5	9–3	5–0
Apr 18	Topeka Hawks	Clark Field • Austin, TX	W 5–4	10–3	
Apr 27	at TCU	Fort Worth, TX	W 9–5	11–3	6–0
Apr 27	at TCU	Fort Worth, TX	L 2–4	11–4	6–1

May
Date	Opponent	Site/stadium	Score	Overall record	SWC record
May 3	Baylor	Clark Field • Austin, TX	W 11–1	12–4	7–1
May 6	at Rice	Houston, TX	W 9–8	13–4	8–1
May 7	TCU	Clark Field • Austin, TX	W 4–0	14–4	9–1
May 10	at SMU	Dallas, TX	W 3–1^{12}	15–4	10–1
May 14	Texas A&M	Clark Field • Austin, TX	W 5–1	16–4	11–1
May 14	Texas A&M	Clark Field • Austin, TX	W 1–0	17–4	12–1
May 29	Plymouth (Sinton, TX) Oilers	Clark Field • Austin, TX	L 4–7	17–5	

Postseason

District 6 playoffs
Date	Opponent	Site/stadium	Score	Overall record	Playoff record
May 31	Arizona	Clark Field • Austin, TX	W 2–0	18–5	1–0
June 4	Arizona	Clark Field • Austin, TX	W 7–1	19–5	2–0

College World Series
Date	Opponent	Site/stadium	Score	Overall record	CWS record
June 8	Connecticut	Johnny Rosenblatt Stadium • Omaha, NE	W 3–0	20–5	1–0
June 9	Penn State	Johnny Rosenblatt Stadium • Omaha, NE	L 1–4	20–6	1–1
June 10	Notre Dame	Johnny Rosenblatt Stadium • Omaha, NE	L 0–9	20–7	1–2
