= Missouri Tigers baseball 1950–1959 =

American college baseball seasons

During the 1950s the Missouri Tigers baseball team were playing in the Big Eight Conference (before 1958 the "Big Seven Conference"). They finished the season as champions in 1952 and 1958, and both times were runners-up in the College World Series.

== 1950 ==
1950 Missouri Tigers baseball
- Conference: Big Eight Conference
- Record: 11–9 (8-5 Big Seven)
- Head coach: Hi Simmons (12th year)

1950 Big Seven Conference baseball standings
| | Conf. | | | | Overall |
| Team | W | | L | PCT | W | | L | PCT |
|---|---|---|---|---|---|---|---|---|
| Nebraska ‍†‍‍^{y} | 11 | – | 3 | .786 | 16 | – | 8 | .667 |
| Missouri ‍‍‍ | 8 | – | 5 | .615 | 11 | – | 9 | .550 |
| Oklahoma ‍‍‍ | 7 | – | 5 | .583 | 14 | – | 8 | .636 |
| Kansas ‍‍‍ | 8 | – | 8 | .500 | 10 | – | 8 | .556 |
| Iowa State ‍‍‍ | 4 | – | 5 | .444 | | – | | – |
| Colorado ‍‍‍ | 4 | – | 7 | .364 | | – | | – |
| Kansas State ‍‍‍ | 5 | – | 11 | .313 | 7 | – | 13 | .350 |
† – Conference champion y – Invited to the NCAA tournament As of June 30, 1950; Rankings from Collegiate Baseball

The 1950 Missouri Tigers baseball team represented the University of Missouri in the 1950 NCAA baseball season. The Tigers played their home games at Rollins Field. The team was coached by Hi Simmons in his 12th season at Missouri.

=== Roster ===
1950 Missouri Tigers
Roster
| Lowell Alexander; Ross Boeger; Gene Crenshaw; Bob Davis; Sam Eatock; Floyd Eberhard; Roger Englert; Jack Frier; Bob Harting; Bud Heineman | Kent Kurtz; Clyde Lannenbeck; Bob Murrey; Robert Phillips; Bill Reddan; Jerry Rosenheim; Bob Smith; Walter Ulmer; Bob Wachter |

=== Schedule ===
Legend
| Missouri win |
| Missouri loss |

1950 Missouri Tigers baseball game log

Regular season
| Date | Opponent | Score | Overall record | Big Seven Record |
|---|---|---|---|---|
| | Arkansas | L 4–7 | 0–1 | |
| | SMU | L 11–20 | 0–2 | |
| | TCU | L 2–3 | 0–3 | |
| | TCU | L 4–6 | 0–4 | |
| | Nebraska | L 1–7 | 0–5 | 0–1 |
| | Nebraska | L 1–3 | 0–6 | 0–2 |
| | Washington University | W 8–5 | 1–6 | |
| | Iowa State | W 5–1 | 2–6 | 1–2 |
| | Iowa State | W 4–3 | 3–6 | 2–2 |
| | Kansas | W 9–2 | 4–6 | 3–2 |
| | Kansas | L 3–9 | 4–7 | 3–3 |
| | Kansas | W 4–3 | 5–7 | 4–3 |
| | Kansas | L 1–2 | 5–8 | 4–4 |
| | Kansas State | W 6–2 | 6–8 | 5–4 |
| | Kansas State | W 3–1 | 7–8 | 6–4 |
| | Colorado | L 0–9 | 7–9 | 6–5 |
| | Washington University | W 12–0 | 8–9 | |
| | Oklahoma | W 9–8 | 9–9 | 7–5 |
| | Oklahoma | W 6–0 | 10–9 | 8–5 |
Complete schedule unavailable

== 1951 ==
1951 Missouri Tigers baseball
- Conference: Big Eight Conference
- Record: 12–6 (9–4 Big Seven)
- Head coach: Hi Simmons (13th year)

1951 Big Seven Conference baseball standings
| | Conf. | | | | Overall |
| Team | W | | L | PCT | W | | L | PCT |
|---|---|---|---|---|---|---|---|---|
| Oklahoma ‍†‍‍^{y} | 10 | – | 1 | .909 | 19 | – | 9 | .679 |
| Missouri ‍‍‍ | 9 | – | 4 | .692 | 12 | – | 6 | .667 |
| Nebraska ‍‍‍ | 5 | – | 4 | .556 | 10 | – | 5 | .667 |
| Colorado ‍‍‍ | 3 | – | 5 | .375 | | – | | – |
| Kansas ‍‍‍ | 5 | – | 9 | .357 | 6 | – | 9 | .400 |
| Kansas State ‍‍‍ | 5 | – | 10 | .333 | 5 | – | 10 | .333 |
| Iowa State ‍‍‍ | 3 | – | 7 | .300 | 8 | – | 7 | .533 |
† – Conference champion y – Invited to the College World Series; As of June 30, 1951; Rankings from Collegiate Baseball

The 1951 Missouri Tigers baseball team represented the University of Missouri in the 1951 NCAA baseball season. The Tigers played their home games at Rollins Field. The team was coached by Hi Simmons in his 13th season at Missouri.

=== Roster ===
1951 Missouri Tigers
Roster
| Dick Atkinson; Bill Barbour; Ross Boeger; Don Boenker; Gene Crenshaw; Floyd Eberhard; Herb Gellman; Bob Harting | Bud Heineman; Kent Kurtz; Clyde Lannenbeck; Robert Loschke; John Patchett; Robert Phillips; Bill Reddan; Junior Wren |

=== Schedule ===
1951 Missouri Tigers baseball game log

Regular season
| Opponent | Score | Overall Record | Big Seven Record |
|---|---|---|---|
| Washington University | 2–0 | 1–0 | – |
| Fort Leonard Wood | 8–5 | 2–0 | – |
| Oklahoma | 4–5 | 2–1 | 0-1 |
| Rockhurst | 1–4 | 2–2 | – |
| Kansas State | 12–1 | 3–2 | 1–1 |
| Kansas State | 7–9 | 3–3 | 1–2 |
| Kansas | 8–0 | 4–3 | 2-2 |
| Nebraska | 4–3 | 5–3 | 3-2 |
| Washington University | 2–0 | 6–3 | – |
| Fort Leonard Wood | 5–18 | 6–4 | – |
| Colorado | 2–0 | 7–4 | 4-2 |
| Kansas State | 0–8 | 7–5 | 4-3 |
| Kansas State | 5–0 | 8–5 | 5-3 |
Complete schedule unavailable

== 1953 ==
1953 Missouri Tigers baseball
- Conference: Big Eight Conference
- Record: 11–8 (9–5 Big Seven)
- Head coach: Hi Simmons (15th year)

1953 Big Seven Conference baseball standings
| | Conf. | | | | Overall |
| Team | W | | L | PCT | W | | L | PCT |
|---|---|---|---|---|---|---|---|---|
| Oklahoma ‍†‍‍^{y} | 7 | – | 2 | .778 | 11 | – | 11 | .500 |
| Nebraska ‍‍‍ | 10 | – | 3 | .769 | 13 | – | 5 | .722 |
| Missouri ‍‍‍ | 9 | – | 5 | .643 | 11 | – | 8 | .579 |
| Colorado ‍‍‍ | 4 | – | 4 | .500 | | – | | – |
| Iowa State ‍‍‍ | 4 | – | 5 | .444 | | – | | – |
| Kansas ‍‍‍ | 4 | – | 8 | .333 | 6 | – | 10 | .375 |
| Kansas State ‍‍‍ | 1 | – | 12 | .077 | 4 | – | 13 | .235 |
† – Conference champion y – Invited to the College World Series; As of June 30, 1953; Rankings from Collegiate Baseball

The 1953 Missouri Tigers baseball team represented the University of Missouri in the 1953 NCAA baseball season. The Tigers played their home games at Rollins Field. The team was coached by Hi Simmons in his 15th season at Missouri.

=== Roster ===
1953 Missouri Tigers
Roster
| Bert Beckmann; Don Boenker; Buddy Cox; Dick Dickinson; James Doerr; Herb Gellman; John Jenkins; Bob Moheskey | Jerry Schoonmaker; Robert Schoonmaker; James Shepard; Larry Soffer; Victor Swenholt; Ray Uriarte; John Willingham; Lee Roy Wwnn |

=== Schedule ===
1953 Missouri Tigers baseball game log

Regular season
| Opponent | Score | Overall Record | Big Seven Record |
|---|---|---|---|
| Tulsa | 5–6 | 0–1 | – |
| Tulsa | 10–9 | 1–1 | – |
| Fort Leonard Wood | 1–2 | 1–2 | – |
| Oklahoma State | 1–4 | 1–3 | – |
| Oklahoma State | 14–3 | 2–3 | – |
| Kansas State | 25–3 | 3–3 | 1-0 |
| Kansas State | 10–2 | 4–3 | 2-0 |
| Nebraska | 6–11 | 4–4 | 2-1 |
| Nebraska | 3–0 | 5–4 | 3-1 |
| Colorado | 9–5 | 6–4 | 4-1 |
| Colorado | 5–6 | 6–5 | 4-2 |
| Kansas State | 10–3 | 7–5 | 5-2 |
| Kansas State | 9–7 | 8–5 | 6-2 |
| Kansas | 8–3 | 9–5 | 7-2 |
| Kansas | 4–3 | 10–5 | 8-2 |
| Kansas | 10–9 | 11–5 | 9-2 |
| Kansas | 7–9 | 11–6 | 9-3 |
| Oklahoma | 2–5 | 11–7 | 9-4 |
| Oklahoma | 5–7 | 11–8 | 9-5 |

== 1955 ==
1955 Missouri Tigers baseball
- Conference: Big Eight Conference
- Record: 14–6 (9–3 Big Seven)
- Head coach: Hi Simmons (17th year)

1955 Big Seven Conference baseball standings
| | Conf. | | | | Overall |
| Team | W | | L | PCT | W | | L | PCT |
|---|---|---|---|---|---|---|---|---|
| Oklahoma ‍†‍‍^{y} | 9 | – | 1 | .900 | 13 | – | 10 | .565 |
| Missouri ‍‍‍ | 9 | – | 3 | .750 | 14 | – | 6 | .700 |
| Nebraska ‍‍‍ | 10 | – | 4 | .714 | 15 | – | 5 | .750 |
| Colorado ‍‍‍ | 5 | – | 6 | .455 | | – | | – |
| Iowa State ‍‍‍ | 5 | – | 8 | .385 | | – | | – |
| Kansas State ‍‍‍ | 2 | – | 10 | .167 | 4 | – | 11 | .267 |
| Kansas ‍‍‍ | 2 | – | 10 | .167 | 6 | – | 16 | .273 |
† – Conference champion y – Invited to the NCAA tournament As of June 30, 1955; Rankings from Collegiate Baseball

The 1955 Missouri Tigers baseball team represented the University of Missouri in the 1955 NCAA baseball season. The Tigers played their home games at Rollins Field. The team was coached by Hi Simmons in his 17th season at Missouri.

=== Roster ===
1955 Missouri Tigers
Roster
- Bert Beckmann
- Ed Cook
- Buddy Cox
- Jack Davis
- George Gleason
- Emil Kammer
- Eldon Morgan
- Bob Musgrave
- Gary Rust
- Todd Sickel
- Norm Stewart
- Lee Roy Wwnn

=== Schedule ===
1955 Missouri Tigers baseball game log

Regular season
| Opponent | Score | Overall Record | Big Seven Record |
|---|---|---|---|
| Fort Leonard Wood | 27–4 | 1–0 | – |
| Fort Leonard Wood | 6–2 | 2–0 | – |
| Arkansas | 11–5 | 3–0 | – |
| Arkansas | 1–2 | 3–1 | – |
| Tulsa | 12–2 | 4–1 | – |
| Tulsa | 10–4 | 5–1 | – |
| Oklahoma State | 3–4 | 5–2 | – |
| Oklahoma State | 7–10 | 5–3 | – |
| Iowa State | 7–0 | 6–3 | 1-0 |
| Oklahoma | 2–4 | 6–4 | 1-1 |
| Oklahoma | 0–4 | 6–5 | 1-2 |
| Colorado | 5–3 | 7–5 | 2-2 |
| Kansas State | 19–1 | 8–5 | 3-2 |
| Kansas State | 15–2 | 9–5 | 4-2 |
| Nebraska | 3–4 | 9–6 | 4-3 |
| Nebraska | 2–1 | 10–6 | 5-3 |
| Kansas | 11–2 | 11–6 | 6-3 |
| Kansas | 16–1 | 12–6 | 7-3 |
| Iowa State | 5–1 | 13–6 | 8-3 |
| Iowa State | 8–7 | 14–6 | 9-3 |

== 1956 ==
1956 Missouri Tigers baseball
- Conference: Big Eight Conference
- Record: 14–7 (7–6 Big Seven)
- Head coach: Hi Simmons (18th year)

1956 Big Seven Conference baseball standings
| | Conf. | | | | Overall |
| Team | W | | L | PCT | W | | L | PCT |
|---|---|---|---|---|---|---|---|---|
| Oklahoma ‍†‍‍^{y} | 7 | – | 2 | .778 | 11 | – | 7 | .611 |
| Nebraska ‍‍‍ | 8 | – | 4 | .667 | 12 | – | 8 | .600 |
| Kansas ‍‍‍ | 6 | – | 5 | .545 | 14 | – | 5 | .737 |
| Missouri ‍‍‍ | 7 | – | 6 | .538 | 14 | – | 7 | .667 |
| Iowa State ‍‍‍ | 6 | – | 6 | .500 | | – | | – |
| Colorado ‍‍‍ | 3 | – | 8 | .273 | | – | | – |
| Kansas State ‍‍‍ | 3 | – | 9 | .250 | 5 | – | 10 | .333 |
† – Conference champion y – Invited to the 1956 NCAA baseball tournament

The 1956 Missouri Tigers baseball team represented the University of Missouri in the 1956 NCAA baseball season. The Tigers played their home games at Rollins Field. The team was coached by Hi Simmons in his 18th season at Missouri.

=== Roster ===
1956 Missouri Tigers
Roster
- Jerry Cutright
- Jack Davis
- John Grace
- Doug Fulick
- Dan Herborn
- Emil Kammer
- Wade LaDue
- Eldon Morgan
- Bob Musgrave
- Bill Ross
- Paul Stehr
- Norm Stewart

=== Schedule ===
1956 Missouri Tigers baseball game log

Regular season
| Opponent | Score | Overall Record | Big Seven Record |
|---|---|---|---|
| Oklahoma State | 7–5 | 1–0 | – |
| Oklahoma State | 9–10 | 1–1 | – |
| Tulsa | 14–6 | 2–1 | – |
| Tulsa | 8–6 | 3–1 | – |
| Washington University | 7–5 | 4–1 | – |
| Washington University | 12–3 | 5–1 | – |
| Arkansas | 2–0 | 6–1 | – |
| Arkansas | 8–2 | 7–1 | – |
| Iowa State | 6–1 | 8–1 | 1-0 |
| Iowa State | 18–4 | 9–1 | 2-0 |
| Kansas State | 8–1 | 10–1 | 3-0 |
| Colorado | 7–4 | 11–1 | 4-0 |
| Colorado | 3–4 | 11–2 | 4-1 |
| Kansas | 18–1 | 12–2 | 5-1 |
| Kansas | 14–5 | 13–2 | 6-1 |
| Oklahoma State | 6–13 | 13–3 | – |
| Nebraska | 7–10 | 13–4 | 6-2 |
| Nebraska | 27–4 | 14–4 | 7-2 |
Complete schedule unavailable

== 1957 ==
1957 Missouri Tigers baseball
- Conference: Big Eight Conference
- Record: 13–7 (10–7 Big Seven)
- Head coach: Hi Simmons (19th year)

1957 Big Seven Conference baseball standings
| | Conf. | | | | Overall |
| Team | W | | L | PCT | W | | L | PCT |
|---|---|---|---|---|---|---|---|---|
| Iowa State ‍†‍‍^{y} | 11 | – | 6 | .647 | 18 | – | 9 | .667 |
| Oklahoma ‍‍‍ | 9 | – | 6 | .600 | 10 | – | 8 | .556 |
| Missouri ‍‍‍ | 10 | – | 7 | .588 | 13 | – | 7 | .650 |
| Kansas ‍‍‍ | 9 | – | 8 | .529 | 11 | – | 11 | .500 |
| Nebraska ‍‍‍ | 8 | – | 9 | .471 | 12 | – | 10 | .545 |
| Kansas State ‍‍‍ | 5 | – | 10 | .333 | 7 | – | 10 | .412 |
| Colorado ‍‍‍ | 5 | – | 11 | .313 | 10 | – | 11 | .476 |
† – Conference champion y – Invited to the NCAA tournament As of June 30, 1957; Rankings from Collegiate Baseball

The 1957 Missouri Tigers baseball team represented the University of Missouri in the 1957 NCAA University Division baseball season. The Tigers played their home games at Rollins Field. The team was coached by Hi Simmons in his 19th season at Missouri.

=== Roster ===
1957 Missouri Tigers
Roster
- Bob Cooper
- Jack Davis
- Doug Gulick
- Dave Hill
- Ralph Hochgrebe
- Charlie James
- Lee Keefer
- Hank Kuhlman
- Wade LaDue
- Don Miller
- Paul Stehr
- Bo Toft
- Ray Uriarte

=== Schedule ===
1957 Missouri Tigers baseball game log

Regular season
| Opponent | Score | Overall Record | Big Seven Record |
|---|---|---|---|
| Arkansas | 12–6 | 1–0 | – |
| Arkansas | 9–7 | 2–0 | – |
| Washington University | 7–0 | 3–0 | – |
| Colorado | 6–2 | 4–0 | 1-0 |
| Colorado | 3–2 | 5–0 | 2-0 |
| Iowa State | 9–14 | 5–1 | 2-1 |
| Iowa State | 5–6 | 5–2 | 2-2 |
| Iowa State | 7–3 | 6–2 | 3-2 |
| Kansas | 16–5 | 7–2 | 4-2 |
| Kansas | 3–6 | 7–3 | 4-3 |
| Kansas | 5–1 | 8–3 | 5-3 |
| Kansas State | 16–4 | 9–3 | 6-3 |
| Kansas State | 6–5 | 10–3 | 7-3 |
| Kansas State | 9–2 | 11–3 | 8-3 |
| Nebraska | 6–8 | 11–4 | 8-4 |
| Nebraska | 2-7 | 11–5 | 8-5 |
| Nebraska | 5-2 | 12–5 | 9-5 |
| Oklahoma | 3–4 | 12–6 | 9-6 |
| Oklahoma | 1–0 | 13–6 | 10-6 |
| Oklahoma | 2–7 | 13–7 | 10-7 |

== 1959 ==
1959 Missouri Tigers baseball
- Conference: Big Eight Conference
- Record: 9–11 (3–11 Big Eight)
- Head coach: Hi Simmons (21st year)

1959 Big Eight Conference baseball standings
| | Conf. | | | | Overall |
| Team | W | | L | PCT | W | | L | PCT |
|---|---|---|---|---|---|---|---|---|
| No. 1 Oklahoma State ‍†‍‍^{y} | 17 | – | 3 | .850 | 27 | – | 5 | .844 |
| Nebraska ‍‍‍ | 11 | – | 4 | .733 | 15 | – | 8 | .652 |
| Iowa State ‍‍‍ | 10 | – | 8 | .556 | 11 | – | 12 | .478 |
| Colorado ‍‍‍ | 7 | – | 8 | .467 | 11 | – | 10 | .524 |
| Oklahoma ‍‍‍ | 7 | – | 10 | .412 | 12 | – | 11 | .522 |
| Kansas ‍‍‍ | 5 | – | 11 | .313 | 9 | – | 11 | .450 |
| Kansas State ‍‍‍ | 4 | – | 9 | .308 | 4 | – | 9 | .308 |
| Missouri ‍‍‍ | 3 | – | 11 | .214 | 9 | – | 11 | .450 |
† – Conference champion y – Invited to the NCAA tournament As of June 30, 1959; Rankings from Collegiate Baseball
