= 1957 Penn State Nittany Lions baseball team =

American college baseball season

1957 Penn State Nittany Lions baseball

District 2 Champions

College World Series, Runner-Up
- Conference: Independent
- Record: 22–2
- Head coach: Joe Bedenk (27th season)

The 1957 Penn State Nittany Lions baseball team represented the Pennsylvania State University in the 1957 NCAA University Division baseball season. The team was coached by Joe Bedenk in his 27th season at Penn State.

The Nittany Lions lost the College World Series, defeated by the California Golden Bears in the championship game.

== Roster ==
1957 Penn State Nittany Lions roster
Pitchers: Ed Drapcho; Cal Emery	Infielders: Steve Baidy; Bob Hoover; Gary Miller; Guy Tirabassi; Dave Watkins; Catchers: Don Stickler	Outfielders: Jim Lockerman; John McMullen; Ron Rainey; Unknown: Wayne Breisch; Elisha Howes; Walter Krauser; John McKersh; Ron Reise; Richard Shingler; David Simmers; Marlin Stover; Coaches: Joe Bedenk - 27th Season

== Schedule ==
1957 Penn State Nittany Lions baseball game log
Regular season
April (7–0)

Date	Opponent	Site/stadium	Score	Overall record
April 10	Western Maryland	Unknown • State College, PA	15–1	1–0
April 13	Penn	Unknown • State College, PA	14–2	2–0
April 16	Bucknell	Unknown • State College, PA	14–2	3–0
April 19	at Gettysburg	Unknown • Gettysburg, PA	13–2	4–0
April 20	at Lafayette	Unknown • Easton, PA	2–1	5–0
April 27	Georgetown	Unknown • State College, PA	12–0	6–0
April 27	Georgetown	Unknown • State College, PA	2–1	7–0

May (10–0)

Date	Opponent	Site/stadium	Score	Overall record
May 1	Villanova	Unknown • State College, PA	11–2	8–0
May 3	Rutgers	Unknown • State College, PA	9–7	9–0
May 4	at Army	Doubleday Field • West Point, NY	16–7	10–0
May 7	at Navy	Unknown • Annapolis, MD	8–5	11–0
May 15	Lehigh	Unknown • State College, PA	10–5	12–0
May 18	at West Virginia	Unknown • Morgantown, WV	6–0	13–0
May 21	at Temple	Erny Field • Philadelphia, PA	10–2	14–0
May 22	at Bucknell	Unknown • Lewisburg, PA	14–0	15–0
May 27	Pittsburgh	Unknown • State College, PA	16–3	16–0
May 27	Pittsburgh	Unknown • State College, PA	7–4	17–0

Postseason
District 2 Tournament (2–0)

Date	Opponent	Site/stadium	Score	Overall record
May 30	vs Manhattan	Ebbets Field • New York, NY	2–1	18–0
May 31	vs St. John's	Ebbets Field • New York, NY	5–0	19–0

1957 College World Series (3–2)

Date	Opponent	Site/stadium	Score	Overall record
June 8	vs Florida State	Johnny Rosenblatt Stadium • Omaha, NE	6–0	20–0
June 9	vs Texas	Johnny Rosenblatt Stadium • Omaha, NE	4–1	21–0
June 10	vs California	Johnny Rosenblatt Stadium • Omaha, NE	0–8	21–1
June 11	vs Notre Dame	Johnny Rosenblatt Stadium • Omaha, NE	5–4	22–1
June 12	vs California	Johnny Rosenblatt Stadium • Omaha, NE	0–1	22–2

== Awards and honors ==
Cal Emery

- College World Series Most Outstanding Player

Ed Drapcho

- First Team All-American
