= George Wolfman =

Biographical details
- Born: February 21, 1911
- Died: May 25, 1983 (aged 72)
- Education: California 1933

Playing career
- 1930–1933: California

Coaching career (HC unless noted)
- 1955–1973: California

George Wolfman (February 21, 1911 – May 25, 1983) was an American college baseball coach who led the California Golden Bears baseball team from 1955 through 1973, including the Bears' second national championship in the 1957 College World Series.

== Playing career ==
Wolfman played for new Bears coach Clint Evans from 1930 through 1933, serving as team captain in 1933. Following his college career, Wolfman played two years for the Mission Reds of the Class AA Pacific Coast League.

== Coaching career ==
After Evans' retirement in 1954, Wolfman took over as head coach of the Bears. He served for 19 seasons, most notably leading Cal to the 1957 College World Series championship in his only NCAA appearance. Wolfman's teams shared three conference championships, posting 14 winning records. Cal honored Wolfman by retiring his number 66, inducting him into the Cal Bears Hall of Fame, and naming the annual award given to the most improved baseball player for him.

== Head coaching record ==
The following table shows Wolfman's record as a head coach.

Record table
Season	Team	Overall	Conference	Standing	Postseason
California Golden Bears (Pacific Coast Conference) (1955–1959)
1955	California	17–16	7–9	4th	
1956	California	25–9	9–7	2nd	
1957	California	35–10	12–4	T-1st	College World Series
1958	California	19–12	9–7	2nd	
1959	California	22–13	9–7	T-2nd	
California:		118–60	46–34		
California Golden Bears (Athletic Association of Western Universities) (1960–1969)
1960	California	30–14	12–4	T-1st	
1961	California	29–10	11–5	2nd	
1962	California	24–20	7–9	3rd	
1963	California	19–21	4–12	5th	
1964	California	25–17	5–15	5th	
1965	California	29–14	12–8	T-1st	
1966	California	32–14	11–9	T-2nd	
1967	California	17–27	3–13	7th	
1968	California	24–24	7–12	6th	
1969	California	31–19	12–9	4th	
California:		260–180	84–96		
California Golden Bears (Pacific-8 Conference) (1970–1973)
1970	California	28–19	9–8	4th	
1971	California	24–24	5–12	7th	
1972	California	33–21	9–9	T-2nd	
1973	California	21–31	6–12	4th	
California:		106–95	29–41		
Total:		484–335			
National champion Postseason invitational champion Conference regular season champion Conference regular season and conference tournament champion Division regular season champion Division regular season and conference tournament champion Conference tournament champion

== See also ==
- Career statistics from Baseball Reference (Minors)
