= 1957 NCAA University Division baseball tournament =

American college sports championship

- Season: 1957
- Teams: 23
- Finals site: Johnny Rosenblatt Stadium; Omaha, NE
- Champions: California (2nd title)
- Runner-up: Penn State (2nd CWS Appearance)
- Winning coach: George Wolfman (1st title)
- MOP: Cal Emery (Penn State)

The 1957 NCAA University Division baseball tournament was played at the end of the 1957 NCAA University Division baseball season to determine the national champion of college baseball. The tournament concluded with eight teams competing in the College World Series, a double-elimination tournament in its eleventh year. Eight regional districts sent representatives to the College World Series with preliminary rounds within each district serving to determine each representative. These events would later become known as regionals. Each district had its own format for selecting teams, resulting in 23 teams participating in the tournament at the conclusion of their regular season, and in some cases, after a conference tournament. The College World Series was held in Omaha, NE from June 9 to June 14. The eleventh tournament's champion was California, coached by George Wolfman. The Most Outstanding Player was Cal Emery of Penn State.

== Tournament ==
=== District 1 ===
Finals
Connecticut	4	4	5
Springfield	9	3	0

=== District 2 ===
Games played at Brooklyn, New York

Semifinals
Penn State	2
Manhattan	1
St. John's	8
Lafayette	3

Finals
Penn State	5
St. John's	0

=== District 3 ===
Games played at Gastonia, North Carolina

Upper round 1
Florida State	5
Georgia Southern	3
Duke	9
George Washington	5
Lower round 1
Georgia Southern	5
George Washington	3

Upper final
Florida State	3
Duke	2
Lower final
Duke	21
Georgia Southern	2

Final
Florida State	6	4
Duke	8	1

=== District 4 ===
Games played at Kalamazoo, Michigan

Upper round 1
Notre Dame	18
Alma	2
Western Michigan	11
Northwestern	1
Lower round 1
Alma	2
Northwestern	11

Upper final
Notre Dame	4
Western Michigan	2
Lower final
Western Michigan	9
Northwestern	10^{10}

Final
Notre Dame	2	6
Northwestern	9	1

=== District 5 ===
Games played at Ames, Iowa

Finals
Iowa State	2	3	—
Bradley	0	0	—

=== District 6 ===
Games played at Austin, Texas

Finals
Texas	7	2	—
Arizona	1	0	—

=== District 7 ===
Games played at Greeley, Colorado

Finals
Colorado State College	8	3	5
Denver	3	4	3^{10}

=== District 8 ===
Games played at Portland, Oregon

Semifinal				Final
				Pepperdine	2	10	3
Pepperdine	4	6	7	California	4	6	10
Portland	5	5	6

== College World Series ==
=== Participants ===
School	Conference	Record (conference)	Head coach	CWS appearances	CWS best finish	CWS record
California	CIBA	31–10 (12–4)	George Wolfman	1 (last: 1947)	1st (1947)	2–0
Colorado State College (Note: Colorado State College is currently known as the University of Northern Colorado. Not to be confused with Colorado State University, then known as Colorado A&M.)	RMC	24–6	Pete Butler	3 (last: 1955)	5th (1955)	1–6
Connecticut	Yankee	18–8 (5–5)	J. Orlean Christian	0 (last: none)	none	0–0
Florida State	FIC	19–4 (7–2)	Danny Litwhiler	0 (last: none)	none	0–0
Iowa State	Big 8	15–8 (11–6)	Cap Timm	0 (last: none)	none	0–0
Notre Dame	Independent	14–8	Jake Kline	0 (last: none)	none	0–0
Penn State	Independent	19–0	Joe Bedenk	1 (last: 1952)	4th (1952)	2–2
Texas	SWC	19–4 (12–1)	Bibb Falk	4 (last: 1953)	1st (1949, 1950)	13–5

=== Results ===
==== Bracket ====
Upper round 1
Texas	3
Connecticut	0
Penn State	7
Florida State	0
California	4
Colorado State College	0
Iowa State	13^{10}
Notre Dame	8

Upper round 2
Texas	1
Penn State	4
California	8
Iowa State	2
Lower round 1
Connecticut	5
Florida State	3
Colorado State College	2
Notre Dame	23

Upper final
Penn State	0
California	8
Lower round 2
Iowa State	5
Connecticut	2
Texas	0
Notre Dame	9

Semifinals
California	9
Iowa State	1
Penn State	5
Notre Dame	4

Final
California	1
Penn State	0

==== Game results ====
Date	Game	Winner	Score	Loser	Notes
June 8	Game 1	Texas	3–0	Connecticut	
June 8	Game 2	Penn State	7–0	Florida State	
June 8	Game 3	California	4–0	Colorado State College	
June 8	Game 4	Iowa State	13–8 (10)	Notre Dame	
June 9	Game 5	Connecticut	5–3	Florida State	Florida State eliminated
June 9	Game 6	Notre Dame	23–2	Colorado State College	Colorado State College eliminated
June 9	Game 7	Penn State	4–1	Texas	
June 9	Game 8	California	8–2	Iowa State	
June 10	Game 9	Iowa State	5–2	Connecticut	Connecticut eliminated
June 10	Game 10	Notre Dame	9–0	Texas	Texas eliminated
June 10	Game 11	California	8–0	Penn State	
June 11	Game 12	Penn State	5–4	Notre Dame	Notre Dame eliminated
June 11	Game 13	California	9–1	Iowa State	Iowa State eliminated
June 12	Final	California	1–0	Penn State	California wins CWS

=== Notable players ===
- California: Earl Robinson
- Colorado State College: Ron Herbel
- Connecticut: Moe Morhardt
- Florida State: Dick Howser
- Iowa State: Dick Bertell, Jerry McNertney
- Notre Dame:
- Penn State: Cal Emery
- Texas: Howie Reed, Harry Taylor

== See also ==
- 1957 NCAA College Division baseball tournament
- 1957 NAIA World Series
