= 1957 Florida State Seminoles baseball team =

American college baseball season

1957 Florida State Seminoles baseball

NCAA District 3 champions

College World Series, 0–2
- Conference: Florida Intercollegiate Conference
- Record: 22–9 (7–2 FIC)
- Head coach: Danny Litwhiler (3rd year)
- Home stadium: Seminole Field

1957 Florida Intercollegiate Conference baseball standings
	Conf.				Overall
Team	W		L	PCT	W		L	PCT
Florida State ‍†‍‍^{y}	7	–	2	.778	22	–	9	.710
Miami (FL) ‍‍‍	7	–	6	.538	11	–	12	.478
Stetson ‍‍‍	5	–	9	.357	7	–	17	.292
Rollins ‍‍‍		–		–	14	–	13	.519
Florida Southern ‍‍‍		–		–	7	–	12	.368
Tampa ‍‍‍		–		–		–		–
† – Conference champion y – Invited to the NCAA tournament As of June 30, 1957; Rankings from Collegiate Baseball

The 1957 Florida State Seminoles baseball team represented Florida State University in the 1957 NCAA University Division baseball season. The Seminoles played their home games at Seminole Field. The team was coached by Danny Litwhiler in his third season at Florida State.

The Seminoles reached the College World Series, their first appearance in Omaha, where they finished tied for seventh after dropping an opening round game against eventual runner-up Penn State and an elimination game against fifth-place Connecticut.

== Personnel ==
=== Roster ===
1957 Florida State Seminoles roster
Pitchers: - John Ash - Senior; 20 - Don Axon - Sophomore; - Jerry Boxer - Senior; 16 - Jack Bristol - Junior; 17 - Rudy Eigl - Junior; - Tom Garcia - Junior; 21 - Fred Kenney - Junior; 22 - Frank Slusser - Junior; 25 - Bobby Waits - Senior; - Al Zyla - Sophomore	Catchers: 18 Mike Copps - Sophomore; 23 - Jerry Couch - Sophomore; - Paul Pasquale - Freshman; 30 - Johnny Sheppard - Junior; Infielders: 26 - Carlee Hendrix - Senior; 12 - Dick Howser - Junior; - Pfil Hunt - Junior; 19 - Dale Koch - Sophomore; - Wayne Long - Sophomore; - Hal Mangin - Sophomore; - Owen McCarron - Junior; 23 - Fred Twomey - Senior	Outfielders: - Lee Corso - Senior; 24 - Jerry Philp - Junior; - Robert Rosell - Junior; - Riley Seevers - Junior; Unknown: - Bill Bunker - Sophomore; - Hal Dyer; - Irwin; - Harold Muchowicz

=== Coaches ===
1957 Florida State Seminoles baseball coaching staff
- Danny Litwhiler – Head coach – 3rd year

== Schedule and results ==
Legend
Florida State win
Florida State loss

1957 Florida State Seminoles baseball game log
Regular season

March
Date	Opponent	Site/stadium	Score	Overall record	FIC record
Mar 19	Auburn*	Seminole Field • Tallahassee, FL	W 8–2	1–0	
Mar 20	Auburn*	Seminole Field • Tallahassee, FL	W 10–5	2–0	
Mar 22	at Stetson	Conrad Park • DeLand, FL	W 15–0	3–0	1–0
Mar 23	at Stetson	Conrad Park • DeLand, FL	L 2–3	3–1	1–1
Mar 25	Michigan State*	Seminole Field • Tallahassee, FL	L 3–8	3–2	
Mar 26	Yale*	Seminole Field • Tallahassee, FL	W 7–0	4–2	
Mar 27	Duke*	Seminole Field • Tallahassee, FL	W 2–0	5–2	
Mar 28	Michigan State*	Seminole Field • Tallahassee, FL	W 7–4	6–2	
Mar 29	Yale*	Seminole Field • Tallahassee, FL	W 11–8	7–2	
Mar 30	Duke*	Seminole Field • Tallahassee, FL	L 1–8	7–3	

April/May
Date	Opponent	Site/stadium	Score	Overall record	FIC record
Apr 2	Ithaca*	Seminole Field • Tallahassee, FL	W 7–6	8–3	
Apr 3	Ithaca*	Seminole Field • Tallahassee, FL	W 21–4	9–3	
Apr 5	Florida*	Seminole Field • Tallahassee, FL	L 2–13	9–4	
Apr 6	Florida*	Seminole Field • Tallahassee, FL	W 4–1	10–4	
Apr 16	Miami (FL)	Seminole Field • Tallahassee, FL	W 15–3	11–4	2–1
Apr 17	Miami (FL)*	Seminole Field • Tallahassee, FL	W 21–3	12–4	3–1
Apr 19	at Georgia Southern*	Statesboro, GA	W 13–2	13–4	
Apr 20	at Georgia Southern*	Statesboro, GA	W 8–3	14–4	
Apr 22	at Auburn*	Plainsman Park • Auburn, AL	L 9–10	14–5	
Apr 23	at Auburn*	Plainsman Park • Auburn, AL	W 10–4	15–5	
Apr 26	at Florida Southern	Lakeland, FL	W 4–0	16–5	4–1
Apr 27	at Florida Southern	Lakeland, FL	W 10–2	17–5	5–1
Apr 30	at Miami (FL)	Miami Field • Miami, FL	W 15–3	18–5	6–1
Apr 30	at Miami (FL)	Miami Field • Miami, FL	L 1–2	18–6	6–2
May 2	at Rollins	Harper-Shepherd Field • Winter Park, FL	W 5–0	19–6	7–2

Postseason

NCAA District 3 playoff
Date	Opponent	Site/stadium	Score	Overall record	NCAAT record
May 31	Georgia Southern	Sims Legion Park • Gastonia, NC	W 5–3	20–6	1–0
May 31	Duke	Sims Legion Park • Gastonia, NC	W 3–2	21–6	2–0
June 1	Duke	Sims Legion Park • Gastonia, NC	L 6–8	21–7	2–1
June 3	Duke	Sims Legion Park • Gastonia, NC	W 4–1	22–7	3–1

College World Series
Date	Opponent	Site/stadium	Score	Overall record	CWS record
June 8	Penn State	Johnny Rosenblatt Stadium • Omaha, NE	L 0–7	22–8	0–1
June 9	Connecticut	Johnny Rosenblatt Stadium • Omaha, NE	L 3–5	22–9	0–2
