= Penn State Nittany Lions baseball =

Baseball team of Penn State University

- 2026 Penn State Nittany Lions baseball team
- Founded: 1893 (132 years ago)
- Conference history: Atlantic 10 (1983–1991)
- University: Pennsylvania State University
- Athletic director: Pat Kraft
- Head coach: Mike Gambino (3rd season)
- Conference: Big Ten
- Location: University Park, Pennsylvania, U.S.
- Home stadium: Medlar Field at Lubrano Park (Capacity: 5,570)
- Nickname: Nittany Lions
- Colors: Blue and white

College World Series runner-up
- 1957

College World Series appearances
- 1952, 1957, 1959, 1963, 1973

NCAA regional champions
- 2000

NCAA tournament appearances
- 1952, 1955, 1956, 1957, 1958, 1959, 1962, 1963, 1967, 1970, 1971, 1972, 1973, 1974, 1975, 1976, 2000

Conference regular season champions
- 1996

The Penn State Nittany Lions baseball team is the varsity intercollegiate athletic team of the Pennsylvania State University in University Park, Pennsylvania, United States. The team competes in the National Collegiate Athletic Association's Division I and are members of the Big Ten Conference.

== History ==
Penn State has played baseball continuously since 1893. The Nittany Lions currently play their home games at 5,570-seat Medlar Field, a facility that opened in 2006 and that they share with the State College Spikes of the MLB Draft League.

After spending most of their history as an Independent, the Nittany Lions joined the Atlantic 10 Conference ahead of the 1983 season. In 1989, Penn State announced plans to join the Big Ten Conference for all sports, beginning baseball play in the Big Ten in 1992. Since joining the conference, Penn State won the 1996 regular season title and has advanced to the Big Ten Tournament championship game twice, most recently in 2024.

Throughout its history, Penn State has played in 17 NCAA baseball tournaments, advancing to the College World Series 5 times, and finishing as runners-up to California in 1957. Penn State's most recent College World Series appearance came in 1973 while its most recent NCAA tournament berth came in 2000, when the Nittany Lions won the Rutgers-hosted Montclair Regional before falling to Texas in the Austin Super Regional.

The Nittany Lions have been coached by Mike Gambino since the 2024 season.

== Penn State in the NCAA Tournament ==
The NCAA Division I baseball tournament started in 1947. The Nittany Lions have played in 17 tournaments and advanced to the College World Series in 1952, 1957, 1959, 1963, and 1973, finishing as the runners-up to California in 1957.

Year	Record	Pct	Notes
1952	2–2	.500	College World Series, 3rd place
1955	0-1	.000	Lost in District 2 Semifinals
1956	0-1	.000	Lost in District 2 Semifinals
1957	5–2	.714	College World Series, 2nd place
1958	0–1	.000	Lost in District 2 Semifinals
1959	4–2	.667	College World Series, 3rd place
1962	0–1	.000	Lost in District 2 Semifinals
1963	3–2	.600	College World Series, 5th place
1967	1–2	.333	District 2 Semifinals
1970	1-2	.333	District 2 Semifinals
1971	1-2	.333	District 2 Semifinals
1972	2–2	.500	District 2 Finals
1973	3–2	.600	College World Series, 7th place
1974	0-2	.000	District 2 Semifinals
1975	1–2	.333	Mideast Regional
1976	0–2	.000	Northeast Regional
2000	4–3	.571	Austin Super Regional
TOTALS	27–31	.466	

== College World Series ==
Penn State baseball has appeared in the College World Series five times. Its best result was runner-up in 1957.

=== Championship Results ===
College World Series

Year	Rank
1952	4
1957	2
1959	4
1963	6
1973	8

Super Regionals

Year	Rank
2000	2

Regionals

Year	Rank
2000	1
1976	5
1975	3
1975	4
1974	4
1973	1
1972	2
1971	3
1970	3
1967	3
1963	1
1962	3
1959	1
1958	3
1957	1
1956	3
1955	3

=== All-Time Scores ===
- 1952 (2-2)
  - Penn State. 5, Texas 3
  - Penn State 12, Duke 7
  - Missouri 3, Penn State 2
  - Holy Cross 15, Penn State 4
- 1957 (3-2)
  - Penn State 7, Florida State 0
  - Penn State 4, Texas 1
  - California 8, Penn State 0
  - Penn State 5, Notre Dame 4
  - California 1, Penn State 0
- 1959 (2-2)
  - Penn State 5, Connecticut 3
  - Oklahoma State 8, Penn State 6
  - Penn St. 7, Clemson 0
  - Oklahoma State 4, Penn State 3
- 1963 (1-2)
  - Arizona 8, Penn State 1
  - Penn State 3, Western Michigan 0
  - Texas 6, Penn State 4 (10 innings)
- 1973 (0-2)
  - Arizona State 3, Penn State 1
  - Oklahoma 6, Penn State 0

=== Awards ===
Jace Diesing Sr. Most Outstanding Player Award

- 1957: Cal Emery

== Season by Season Result ==
Season	League	Conference	Head coach	Conference Results			Regular Season			Conference Results	NCAA Tournament
Season	League	Conference	Head coach	Wins	Losses	Ties	Wins	Losses	Ties	Conference Results	NCAA Tournament
Penn State Nittany Lions
1952	NCAA	Independent	Joe Bedenk				15	4	0		CWS, 3rd place
1955	NCAA	Independent	Joe Bedenk								District 2 Semifinals
1956	NCAA	Independent	Joe Bedenk								District 2 Semifinals
1957	NCAA	Independent	Joe Bedenk	0	0	0	19	0	0		District 2 Champions CWS, 2nd place
1958	NCAA	Independent	Joe Bedenk								District 2 Semifinals
1959	NCAA	Independent	Joe Bedenk				15	4	0		District 2 Champions CWS, 3rd place
1962	NCAA	Independent									District 2 Semifinals
1963	NCAA	Independent	Chuck Medlar				13	4	0		District 2 Champions CWS, 5th place
1965	NCAA	Independent	Chuck Medlar	0	0	0	0	0	0		
1966	NCAA	Independent	Chuck Medlar	0	0	0	15	8	0		
1967	NCAA	Independent	Chuck Medlar	0	0	0	16	8	1		District 2 Semifinals
1968	NCAA	Independent	Chuck Medlar	0	0	0	10	12	0		
1969	NCAA	Independent	Chuck Medlar	0	0	0	14	8	0		
1970	NCAA	Independent	Chuck Medlar	0	0	0	17	8	0		District 2 Semifinals
1971	NCAA	Independent	Chuck Medlar	0	0	0	15	6	0		District 2 Semifinals
1972	NCAA	Independent	Chuck Medlar	0	0	0	18	5	1		District 2 Finals
1973	NCAA	Independent	Chuck Medlar	0	0	0	19	7	0		District 2 Champions CWS, 7th place
1974	NCAA	Independent	Chuck Medlar	0	0	0	18	6	1		District 2 Semifinals
1975	NCAA	Independent	Chuck Medlar	0	0	0	22	9	0		Mideast Regional
1976	NCAA	Independent	Chuck Medlar	0	0	0	18	8	0		Northeast Regional
1977	NCAA	Independent	Chuck Medlar	0	0	0	18	6	0		
1978	NCAA	Independent	Chuck Medlar	0	0	0	17	6	2		
1979	NCAA	Eastern 8	Chuck Medlar	0	0	0	20	5	0	5 Seed, 2-1	
1980	NCAA	Independent	Chuck Medlar	0	0	0	17	7	0		
1981	NCAA	Independent	Chuck Medlar	0	0	0	17	12	0		
1982	NCAA	Independent	Shorty Stoner	0	0	0	17	11	0		
1983	NCAA	Atlantic 10	Shorty Stoner	9	1	0	16	23	0	1 Seed West Division, 0-2, Lost to Temple in Title Game	
1984	NCAA	Atlantic 10	Shorty Stoner	9	5	0	24	17	0	2 Seed West Division, 1-2, Lost to Temple in Lower Final	
1985	NCAA	Atlantic 10	Shorty Stoner	11	4	0	32	14	0	2 Seed West Division, 1-2, Lost to West Virginia in Lower Final	
1986	NCAA	Atlantic 10	Shorty Stoner	8	7	0	29	19	0	3 Seed West Division (Did not Qualify)	
1987	NCAA	Atlantic 10	Shorty Stoner	12	6	0	29	19	0	2 Seed West Division, 0-2, Lost to UMass in Lower Round 1	
1988	NCAA	Atlantic 10	Shorty Stoner	9	8	0	24	26	0	3 Seed West Division (Did not Qualify)	
1989	NCAA	Atlantic 10	Shorty Stoner	12	4	0	23	19	1	2 Seed West Division, 0-2, Lost to GWU in Lower Round 1	
1990	NCAA	Atlantic 10	Shorty Stoner	6	10	0	22	23	0	4 Seed West Division (Did not Qualify)	
1991	NCAA	Atlantic 10	Joe Hindelang	14	6	0	25	20	0	1 Seed West Division, 1-2, Lost to Rutgers in Lower Final	
1992	NCAA	Big Ten	Joe Hindelang	11	17	0	24	24	0	8 Seed (Did not Qualify)	
1993	NCAA	Big Ten	Joe Hindelang	5	23	0	15	28	0	10 Seed (Did not Qualify)	
1994	NCAA	Big Ten	Joe Hindelang	12	15	0	25	24	0	6 Seed (Did not Qualify)	
1995	NCAA	Big Ten	Joe Hindelang	13	13	0	25	29	0	5 Seed (Did not Qualify)	
1996	NCAA	Big Ten	Joe Hindelang	19	8	0	32	24	0	1 Seed, 1-2, Eliminated by Illinois in Lower Final	
1997	NCAA	Big Ten	Joe Hindelang	12	14	0	29	24	0	6 Seed (Did not Qualify)	
1998	NCAA	Big Ten	Joe Hindelang	15	11	0	28	24	0	4 Seed, 1-2, Eliminated by Illinois in Lower Final	
1999	NCAA	Big Ten	Joe Hindelang	12	15	0	32	23	0	6 Seed (Did not Qualify)	
2000	NCAA	Big Ten	Joe Hindelang	18	9	0	41	17	0	2 Seed, 3-2, Eliminated by Illinois in Final	Montclair Regional Champions Austin Super Regional
2001	NCAA	Big Ten	Joe Hindelang	15	11	0	29	29	0	4 Seed, 1-2, Eliminated by Michigan in Third Round	
2002	NCAA	Big Ten	Joe Hindelang	11	19	0	23	30	0	10 Seed (Did not Qualify)	
2003	NCAA	Big Ten	Joe Hindelang	17	15	0	29	28	0	4 Seed, 3-2, Eliminated by Ohio State in Lower Final	
2004	NCAA	Big Ten	Joe Hindelang	17	15	0	28	29	0	6 Seed, 0-2, Eliminated by Michigan State in Lower Round 1	
2005	NCAA	Big Ten	Robbie Wine	13	19	0	28	27	0	8 Seed (Did not Qualify)	
2006	NCAA	Big Ten	Robbie Wine	13	19	0	26	30	0	8 Seed (Did not Qualify)	
2007	NCAA	Big Ten	Robbie Wine	20	10	0	31	26	0	3 Seed, 3-2, Eliminated by Minnesota in Lower Final	
2008	NCAA	Big Ten	Robbie Wine	17	15	0	27	31	0	3 Seed, 1-2, Eliminated by Indiana in Lower Round 3	
2009	NCAA	Big Ten	Robbie Wine	8	16	0	25	26	0	8 Seed (Did not Qualify)	
2010	NCAA	Big Ten	Robbie Wine	9	15	0	22	30	0	10 Seed (Did not Qualify)	
2011	NCAA	Big Ten	Robbie Wine	12	12	0	32	22	0	6 Seed, 0-2, Eliminated by Minnesota in Lower Round 1	
2012	NCAA	Big Ten	Robbie Wine	15	9	0	29	27	0	3 Seed, 0-2, Eliminated by Nebraska in Lower Round 1	
2013	NCAA	Big Ten	Robbie Wine	4	20	0	14	36	0	10 Seed (Did not Qualify)	
2014	NCAA	Big Ten	Rob Cooper	5	18	0	18	32	0	10 Seed (Did not Qualify)	
2015	NCAA	Big Ten	Rob Cooper	6	16	0	18	30	0	12 Seed (Did not Qualify)	
2016	NCAA	Big Ten	Rob Cooper	12	12	0	28	27	0	10 Seed (Did not Qualify)	
2017	NCAA	Big Ten	Rob Cooper	4	20	0	18	37	0	13 Seed (Did not Qualify)	
2018	NCAA	Big Ten	Rob Cooper	3	21	0	15	34	0	13 Seed (Did not Qualify)	
2019	NCAA	Big Ten	Rob Cooper	4	18	0	22	27	0	13 Seed (Did not Qualify)	
2020	NCAA	Big Ten	Rob Cooper	0	0	0	10	5	0	Was not held due to COVID-19 pandemic	
2021	NCAA	Big Ten	Rob Cooper	18	24	0	18	24	0	Was not held due to COVID-19 pandemic	
2022	NCAA	Big Ten	Rob Cooper	26	29	0	11	13	0	6 Seed, 1-2, Eliminated by Rutgers in Second Round	
2023	NCAA	Big Ten	Rob Cooper	7	16	0	25	25	0	12 Seed, (Did not Qualify)	
2024	NCAA	Big Ten	Mike Gambino	12	12	0	29	24	0	7 Seed, 3-1, Lost to Nebraska in Big Ten Championship game	
2025	NCAA	Big Ten	Mike Gambino	15	15	0	33	23	0	9 Seed, 2-1, Lost to Nebraska in Big Ten Tournament semifinals	
2026	NCAA	Big Ten	Mike Gambino	2	4	0	7	16	0	TBD	
Total				490	572	0	1413	1213	6	Final Standings, Tournament Record, Final Game	

=== Shutouts ===
- 1957: Ed Drapcho, Penn St. vs. Florida St., 6-8-57 (7-0)
- 1959: Ron Riese, Penn St. vs. Clemson, 6-15-59 (7-0)
- 1963: Dick Noe, Penn St. vs. Western Mich., 6-11-63 (3-0)

== Notable alumni ==
To date Penn State has had 89 players drafted and has been the alma mater to 24 MLB Players

== Statistical Leaders ==
=== Batting ===
==== Games Played ====
Career
Rank	Player	Games	Years
1	Mike Campo	219	1997 1998 1999 2000
2	Cory Wine	218	2006 2007 2008 2009
3	Chris Netwall	214	1998 1999 2000 2001
4	Jordan Steranka	210	2009 2010 2011 2012
5	Mike Milliron	208	2002 2003 2004 2005
6	Adam Beers	205	1995 1996 1997 1998
7	Eric Spadt	204	1997 1998 1999 2000
8	Shawn Fagan	203	1997 1998 1999 2000
9	Chris Wright	202	1999 2000 2001 2002
10	Brian Ernst	201	2005 2006 2007 2008

Single season
Rank	Player	Games	Year
1	Mike Campo	64	2000
	Shawn Fagan	64	2000
	Zach Smithlin	64	2000
4	Eric Spadt	63	2000
5	Chris Netwall	59	2000
6	Chris Wright	58	2001
	Zach Smithlin	58	2001
	Brian Ernst	58	2008
	Cory Wine	58	2008
	Rick Marlin	58	2008

==== At Bats ====
Career
Rank	Player	At Bats	Years
1	Jordan Steranka	867	2009 2010 2011 2012
2	Cory Wine	799	2006 2007 2008 2009
3	Mike Campo	791	1997 1998 1999 2000
4	Steve Snyder	766	2010 2012 2013 2014
5	Brian Ernst	738	2005 2006 2007 2008
6	Shawn Fagan	700	1997 1998 1999 2000
7	Sean Deegan	694	2009 2010 2011 2012
8	Elliot Searer	682	2010 2011 2012 2013
9	Chris Netwall	680	1998 1999 2000 2001
10	Mike Milliron	678	2002 2003 2004 2005

Single season
Rank	Player	At Bats	Year
1	Mike Campo	261	2000
2	Shawn Fagan	244	2000
3	Jordan Steranka	236	2010
4	Matt Cavagnaro	233	2007
	Sean Deegan	233	2012
6	Jordan Steranka	222	2012
	Sean Deegan	222	2011
8	Joe Blackburn	219	2007
	Jim Haley	219	2016
10	Brian Ernst	218	2008
	Sean Deegan	218	2010

==== Runs Scored ====
Career
Rank	Player	Runs Scored	Years
1	Mike Campo	282	1997 1998 1999 2000
2	Shawn Fagan	188	1997 1998 1999 2000
3	Jordan Steranka	165	2009 2010 2011 2012
4	Eric Spadt	157	1997 1998 1999 2000
5	Chris Netwall	153	1998 1999 2000 2001
6	Kevin Billotte	146	1995 1996 1997 1998
7	Chris Wright	141	1999 2000 2001 2002
8	Mike Milliron	139	2002 2003 2004 2005
9	Derek Bochna	135	1992 1993 1994 1995
10	Sean Deegan	132	2009 2010 2011 2012

Single season
Rank	Player	Runs Scored	Year
1	Mike Campo	83	2000
2	Shawn Fagan	72	2000
3	Mike Campo	63	1999
4	Matthew Wood	55	2022
5	Eric Spadt	54	2000
	Sean Deegan	54	2011
7	Kevin Billotte	53	1998
	Ben Heath	53	2010
9	Shawn Fagan	52	1998
	Mike Derenzo	52	2002

==== Hits ====
Career
Rank	Player	Hits	Years
1	Mike Campo	295	1997 1998 1999 2000
2	Jordan Steranka	292	2009 2010 2011 2012
3	Shawn Fagan	251	1997 1998 1999 2000
4	Brian Ernst	234	2005 2006 2007 2008
5	Cory Wine	228	2006 2007 2008 2009
6	Steve Snyder	224	2010 2012 2013 2014
7	Chris Netwall	218	1998 1999 2000 2001
	Chris Wright	218	1999 2000 2001 2002
9	Lance Thompson	216	2003 2004 2005 2006
10	Jared Sadlowski	212	1994 1995 1996 1997

Single season
Rank	Player	Hits	Year
1	Mike Campo	111	2000
2	Shawn Fagan	92	2000
3	Jordan Steranka	82	2012
4	Matt Cavagnaro	78	2007
	Brian Ernst	78	2008
6	Lance Thompson	77	2006
7	Joe Blckburn	76	2007
8	Wes Reohr	75	2002
	Joey DeBernardis	75	2010
	Matthew Wood	75	2022

==== Doubles ====
Career
Rank	Player	Doubles	Years
1	Chris Wright	59	1999 2000 2001 2002
	Jordan Steranka	59	2009 2010 2011 2012
3	Joey DeBernardis	54	2009 2010 2011 2012
4	Mike Campo	53	1997 1998 1999 2000
5	Jared Sadlowski	50	1994 1995 1996 1997
6	Lance Thompson	47	2003 2004 2005 2006
7	Cory Wine	44	2006 2007 2008 2009
8	Dave Hall	39	1991 1992 1993 1994
	Chris Netwall	39	1998 1999 2000 2001
	Brian Ernst	39	2005 2006 2007 2008

Single season
Rank	Player	Doubles	Year
1	Mike Campo	24	2000
	Joey DeBernardis	24	2011
3	Chris Wright	23	2000
4	Jordan Steranka	20	2012
	Dave Hall	20	1992
6	Dan Beers	19	1999
7	Sean Deegan	18	2011
8	Paul Komorowski	17	1988
	Chris Wright	17	2001
	Josh Spiegel	17	2022

==== Triples ====
Career
Rank	Player	Triples	Years
1	Sean Deegan	15	2009 2010 2011 2012
2	Kevin Billotte	13	1995 1996 1997 1998
3	Mike Campo	12	1997 1998 1999 2000
	Jordan Steranka	12	2009 2010 2011 2012
5	Russ Mushinsky	10	1989 1990 1991
	Mike Derenzo	10	1999 2001 2002 2003
7	Shawn Fagan	9	1997 1998 1999 2000
	Cory Wine	9	2006 2007 2008 2009
9	Lance Thompson	8	2003 2004 2005 2006
	Joe Blackburn	8	2004 2005 2006 2007 2008
	Joey DeBernardis	8	2009 2010 2011 2012
	Steve Snyder	8	2010 2012 2013 2014
	Greg Guers	8	2014 2015 2016

Single season
Rank	Player	Triples	Year
1	Kevin Billotte	6	1995
2	Russ Mushinksky	5	1990
	Mike Campo	5	2000
	Joe Blackburn	5	2007
	Sean Deegan	5	2010
	Sean Deegan	5	2011
	Jordan Steranka	5	2011

==== Homeruns ====
Career
Rank	Player	Homeruns	Years
1	Shawn Fagan	43	1997 1998 1999 2000
2	Chris Netwall	34	1998 1999 2000 2001
3	Dan Beers	33	1997 1998 1999
4	Jordan Steranka	32	2009 2010 2011 2012
5	Mike Campo	30	1997 1998 1999 2000
	Chris Wright	30	1999 2000 2001 2002
7	Eric Spadt	29	1997 1998 1999 2000
8	Derek Bochna	28	1992 1993 1994 1995
9	Sean Deegan	26	2009 2010 2011 2012
10	Carl Albrecht	25	1995 1996 1997

Single season
Rank	Player	Homeruns	Year
1	Ben Heath	19	2010
2	David Simononis	17	1978
3	Dan Beers	16	1998
4	Shawn Fagan	15	2000
5	Adam Beers	13	1998
	Dan Beers	13	1999
	Shawn Fagan	13	1999
	Chris Wright	13	2001
9	Jared Sadlowski	12	1997
	Shawn Fagan	12	1998
	Chris Netwall	12	1999
	Sean Deegan	12	2011
	Matthew Wood	12	2022

==== Runs Batted In (RBI) ====
Career
Rank	Player	RBI	Years
1	Shawn Fagan	198	1997 1998 1999 2000
2	Jordan Steranka	183	2009 2010 2011 2012
3	Chris Wright	176	1999 2000 2001 2002
4	Mike Campo	152	1997 1998 1999 2000
5	Chris Netwall	137	1998 1999 2000 2001
6	Dan Beers	128	1997 1998 1999
	Eric Spadt	128	1997 1998 1999 2000
	Cory Wine	128	2006 2007 2008 2009
9	Jared Sadlowski	124	1994 1995 1996 1997 1998
10	Lance Thompson	121	2003 2004 2005 2006

Single season
Rank	Player	RBI	Year
1	Shawn Fagan	80	2000
2	Dan Beers	60	1998
3	Chris Wright	58	2000
4	Ben Heath	57	2010
	Jordan Steranka	57	2011
6	Chris Wright	56	2001
	Robert Yodice	56	2008
8	Shawn Fagan	53	1999
	Matthew Wood	53	2022
10	Carl Albrecht	52	1997

==== Stolen Bases ====
Career
Rank	Player	Steals	Years
1	Zach Smithlin	62	2000 2001 2002 2003
2	Mike Campo	57	1997 1998 1999 2000
3	Sean Deegan	41	2009 2010 2011 2012
4	Kevin Billotte	39	1995 1996 1997 1998
5	Derek Bochna	35	1992 1993 1994 1995
	Blake Lynd	35	2009 2010 2011
	Steve Snyder	35	2010 2012 2013 2014
	Greg Guers	35	2014 2015 2016
9	Ryan Wheeler	34	1991 1992 1993 1994
	Shawn Fagan	34	1997 1998 1999 2000

Single season
Rank	Player	Steals	Year
1	Mike Campo	27	1999
	Kyle Hannon	27	2023
3	Rod Perry	24	2001
	Zach Smithlin	24	2003
	Sean Deegan	24	2010
6	Blake Lynd	22	2009
7	O.J. McDuffie	20	1990
	Mike Campo	20	2000
	Greg Guers	20	2016
10	Ray Lopez	17	1991

==== Caught Stealing ====
Career
Rank	Player	Caught Steals	Years
1	Steve Snyder	22	2010 2012 2013 2014
2	Mike Milliron	17	2002 2003 2004 2005
3	Kevin Billotte	15	1995 1996 1997 1998
4	Derek Bochna	14	1992 1993 1994 1995
5	Ryan Wheeler	13	1991 1992 1993 1994
	Chris Netwall	13	1998 1999 2000 2001
7	Kirk Rentschler	12	1992 1993 1994 1995
	Shawn Fagan	12	1997 1998 1999 2000
9	Ray Werner	11	1995 1996
	Zach Smithlin	11	2000 2001 2002 2003
	Blake Lynd	11	2009 2010 2011
	Jim Haley	11	2014 2015 2016

Single season
Rank	Player	Caught Steals	Year
1	Steve Snyder	10	2013
2	Blake Lynd	9	2009
3	Ray Werner	8	1995
4	Lance Rathmell	7	1994
	Kevin Billotte	7	1995
	Mike Milliron	7	2005
7	Russ Mushinsky	6	1991
	Eric Spadt	6	1999
	Rod Perry	6	2001
	Brian Ernst	6	2007
	Curtis Robison	6	2021

==== Walks ====
Career
Rank	Player	Walks	Years
1	Shawn Fagan	126	1997 1998 1999 2000
2	Eric Spadt	112	1997 1998 1999 2000
3	Ryan Wheeler	106	1991 1992 1993 1994
4	Kevin Billotte	104	1995 1996 1997 1998
5	James Coates	103	2013 2014 2015 2016
6	Chris Wright	101	1999 2000 2001 2002
7	Mike Campo	90	1997 1998 1999 2000
8	Donnie Wright	87	1997 1998 1999 2000 2001
9	Chris Netwall	86	1998 1999 2000 2001
10	Cory Wine	85	2006 2007 2008 2009

Single season
Rank	Player	Walks	Year
1	Eric Spadt	47	2000
2	Shawn Fagan	46	1999
3	Shawn Fagan	39	2000
	Landon Kakata	39	2008
5	James Coates	37	2016
6	Scott Gummo	36	2006
	Matthew Wood	36	2022
8	Ryan Wheeler	35	1994
	Mike Milliron	35	2004
10	Chris Wrigth	34	2001
	Wes Borden	34	2008
