= Rocky Miller Park =

Baseball stadium in Evanston, Illinois

Rocky and Berenice Miller Park
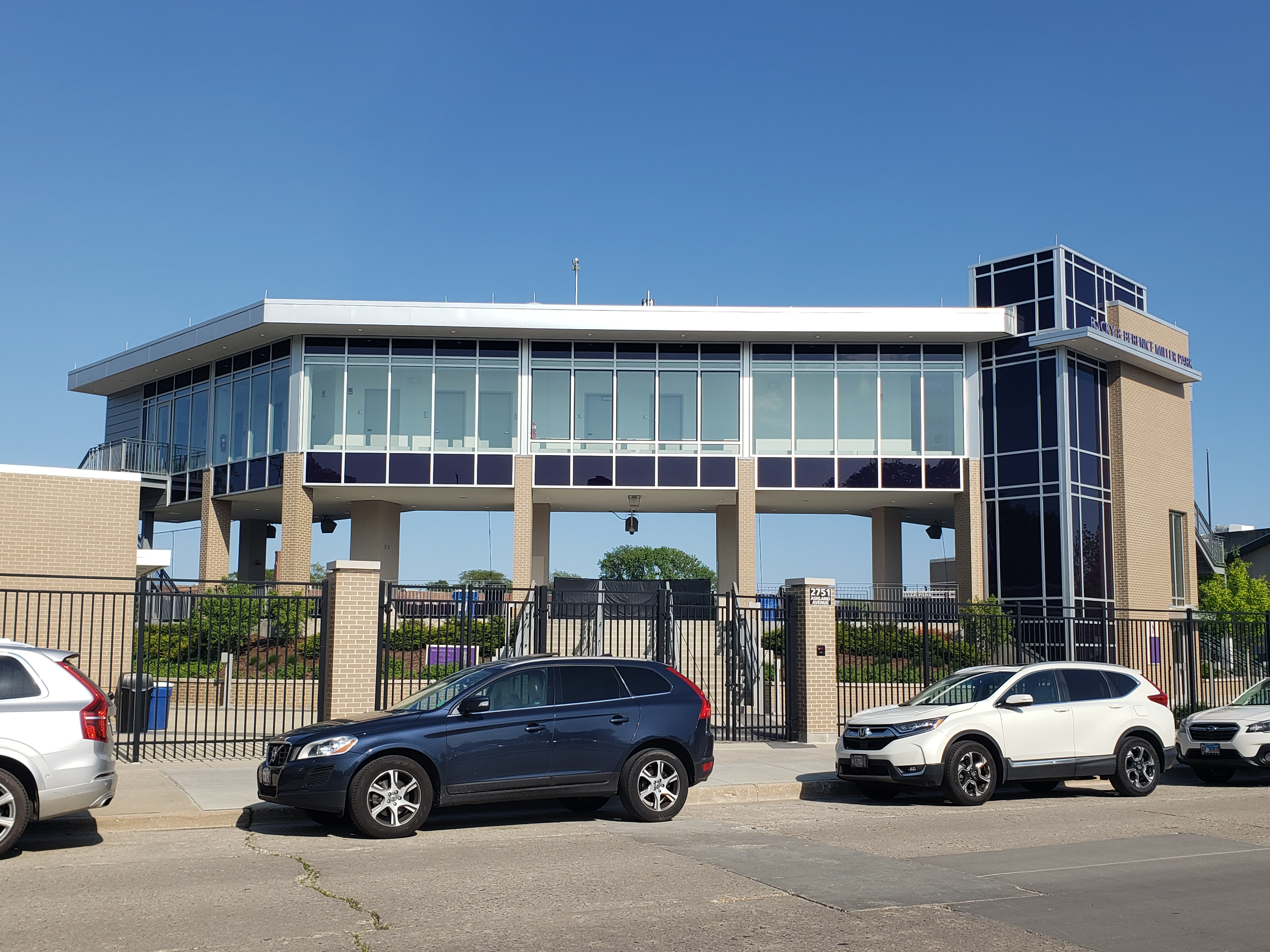

- 1 Rocky and Berenice Miller Park (the United States)
- Former names: Wells Field (1958–1983)
- Address: 2750 Ashland Avenue
- Location: Evanston, Illinois
- Coordinates: 42.068261°N 87.693046°W
- Owner: Northwestern University
- Operator: Northwestern University
- Capacity: 600
- Type: Stadium
- Event: Baseball
- Surface: Artificial turf
- Scoreboard: Electronic

Construction
- Opened: 1943
- Renovated: 1983, 2014
- Architects: FGM Architects and Populous

Tenant
- Northwestern Wildcats baseball (NCAA) (1943–present)

Website
- admin.nusports.com/galleries/baseball/rocky-and-berenice-miller-park/1308

Rocky and Berenice Miller Park is a baseball stadium in Evanston, Illinois. It is the home field of the Northwestern Wildcats college baseball team. The stadium holds 600 people seated and opened for baseball in 1943. In 2014, the park began a renovation, and reopened on April 2, 2016, against the Michigan Wolverines. The renovation added the Hayden Clubhouse, which holds the team's locker room. A new players' lounge, and a new LED scoreboard are among other additions to the stadium.

== See also ==
- List of NCAA Division I baseball venues
