= Cal Emery =

American baseball player (1937–2010)

- First baseman
- Born: June 28, 1937; Centre Hall, Pennsylvania, U.S.
- Died: November 28, 2010 (aged 73); Tulsa, Oklahoma, U.S.
- Batted: Left Threw: Left

MLB debut
- July 15, 1963, for the Philadelphia Phillies

Last MLB appearance
- September 20, 1963, for the Philadelphia Phillies

MLB statistics
- Batting average: .158
- Home runs: 0
- Runs batted in: 0

NPB statistics
- Batting average: .213
- Home runs: 8
- Runs batted in: 30
- Stats at Baseball Reference

Teams
- Philadelphia Phillies (1963); Hankyu Braves (1970)

Calvin Wayne Emery (June 28, 1937 – November 28, 2010) was an American professional baseball player and batting coach. He was a first baseman in Major League Baseball (MLB) for the Philadelphia Phillies. He also spent the 1970 season with Hankyu Braves of the Nippon Professional Baseball (NPB). During his playing days, Emery stood 6 feet 2 inches (1.88 m) tall, weighing 205 pounds (93 kg); he threw and batted left-handed. Emery attended Penn State University.

== Career ==
Emery was signed by the Phillies as an amateur free agent, on June 5, 1958. Five years and one month later, on July 15, 1963, he made his big league debut at the age of 26. In 16 career MLB games (most of them as a pinch hitter), he hit .158, in 19 at-bats. Of Emery’s three major league hits, one was a double; however, he showed a keen eye at the plate, by striking out only twice. (In a 500 at-bat season, that would only be about 53 strikeouts.) Emery played his final big league game on September 20, 1963.

During Emery's only MLB season, he wore uniform number 9.

Emery hit .400 for the Triple-A Eugene Emeralds in the Pacific Coast League (PCL) in 1969, collecting 104 hits in 260 at-bats. The following season, he played for the NPB Hankyu Braves.

After his playing career, Emery managed in minor league baseball (MiLB), scouted for multiple organizations, and served as a big league batting coach for the 1988 Chicago White Sox.

On November 28, 2010, Emery died at age 73 in Tulsa, Oklahoma.

== Other information ==
- Emery won the Most Outstanding Player Award in the 1957 College World Series.
- Emery served as a coach for the Chicago White Sox in 1988.
- Emery was the 1959 MVP of the Three-I League (a.k.a. the Illinois–Indiana–Iowa League). He played for the Des Moines Demons.
- Emery was selected as the first baseman on the 1969 Sporting News Triple-A West All-Star Team.
