= 1957 California Golden Bears baseball team =

American college baseball season

1957 California Golden Bears baseball

National champions Pacific Coast Conference champions
- Conference: California Intercollegiate Baseball Association
- Record: 35-10 (12-4 CIBA)
- Head coach: George Wolfman (3rd year)
- Home stadium: Evans Diamond

1957 Pacific Coast Conference baseball standings
	Conf.				Overall
Team	W		L	PCT	W		L	PCT
North Division
Oregon ‍†‍‍	11	–	3	.786		–		–
Oregon State ‍‍‍	8	–	7	.533	18	–	13	.581
Washington ‍‍‍	8	–	8	.500	20	–	11	.645
Idaho ‍‍‍	5	–	8	.385		–		–
Washington State ‍‍‍	5	–	11	.313	14	–	21	.400
California Intercollegiate Baseball Association
California ‍†‍‍^{y}	12	–	4	.750	35	–	10	.778
Southern California ‍‍‍	12	–	4	.750	18	–	4	.818
Stanford ‍‍‍	7	–	9	.438	17	–	13	.567
UCLA ‍‍‍	5	–	9	.357	15	–	15	.500
Santa Clara ‍‍‍	2	–	12	.143		–		–
† – Conference champion y – Invited to the NCAA tournament

The 1957 California Golden Bears baseball team represented the University of California in the 1957 NCAA University Division baseball season. The Golden Bears played their home games at Evans Diamond. The team was coached by George Wolfman in his 3rd season at California.

The Golden Bears won the College World Series, defeating the Penn State Nittany Lions in the championship game.

== Roster ==
1957 California Golden Bears roster
Pitchers: Kim Elliott; George Sterling; Doug Weiss; Catchers: Charles Thompson	Infielders: Ron Gaggero; Roger Gregg; Ed Kraft; Warren Lavorell; Earl Robinson	Outfielders: Bernie Kelley; Tom Palma; Paul Piper; Bob Puccinelli; Al Reynolds; Bernie Simpson	Position Unknown: Charles Becker

== Schedule ==
1957 California Golden Bears baseball game log
Post-season
NCAA tournament: District 8 playoff

Opponent	Score	Overall record
vs. Pepperdine	4-2	29-9
vs. Pepperdine	6-10	29-10
vs. Pepperdine	10-3	30-10

NCAA tournament: College World Series

Date	Opponent	Site/stadium	Score	Overall record
June 8	vs. Northern Colorado	Rosenblatt Stadium	4-0	31-10
June 9	vs. Iowa State	Rosenblatt Stadium	8-2	32-10
June 10	vs. Penn State	Rosenblatt Stadium	8-0	33-10
June 11	vs. Iowa State	Rosenblatt Stadium	9-1	34-10
June 12	vs. Penn State	Rosenblatt Stadium	1-0	35-10

== Awards and honors ==
Earl Robinson

- All-America First Team
- All-District 8 First Team

Charles Thompson

- All-America First Team
- All-District 8 First Team

Doug Weiss

- All-America First Team
- All-District 8 First Team
