= 1999 Big 12 Conference baseball tournament =

American college baseball tournament

- Teams: 8
- Format: Double elimination
- Finals site: AT&T Bricktown Ballpark; Oklahoma City, Oklahoma
- Champions: Nebraska (1st title)
- Winning coach: Dave Van Horn (1st title)
- MVP: Jason Jennings (Baylor)
- Attendance: 129,334

1999 Big 12 Conference baseball standings
	Conf.				Overall
Team	W		L	PCT	W		L	PCT
No. 7 Texas A&M ‍†‍‍^{y}	23	–	6	.793	53	–	17	.757
No. 9 Baylor ‍‍‍^{y}	20	–	7	.741	50	–	15	.769
No. 22 Texas Tech ‍‍‍^{y}	18	–	8	.692	42	–	17	.712
No. 8 Oklahoma State ‍‍‍^{y}	18	–	9	.667	46	–	21	.687
Nebraska ‍‍‡‍^{y}	16	–	9	.640	42	–	18	.700
Texas ‍‍‍^{y}	17	–	13	.567	36	–	26	.581
Missouri ‍‍‍	14	–	13	.519	37	–	19	.661
Oklahoma ‍‍‍	12	–	18	.400	30	–	29	.508
Kansas State ‍‍‍	11	–	18	.379	26	–	29	.473
Kansas ‍‍‍	4	–	26	.133	14	–	40	.259
Iowa State ‍‍‍	2	–	28	.067	17	–	36	.321
† – Conference champion ‡ – Tournament champion y – Invited to the NCAA tournament As of June 30, 1999; Rankings from Collegiate Baseball

The 1999 Big 12 Conference baseball tournament was held at AT&T Bricktown Ballpark in Oklahoma City, OK from May 23 through 27. Nebraska won their first of three consecutive tournaments and earned the Big 12 Conference's automatic bid to the 1999 NCAA Division I baseball tournament. This was the first year the conference switched to format used by the College World Series with two 4-team double-elimination brackets and a final championship game.

== Regular season standings ==
Place	Seed	Team	Conference				Overall		
Place	Seed	Team	W	L	%	GB	W	L	%
1	1	Texas A&M	23	6	.793	–	52	18	.743
2	2	Baylor	20	7	.741	2	50	15	.769
3	3	Texas Tech	18	8	.692	3.5	42	17	.712
4	4	Oklahoma State	18	9	.667	4	46	21	.687
5	5	Nebraska	16	9	.640	5	42	18	.700
6	6	Texas	17	13	.567	6.5	36	26	.581
7	7	Missouri	14	13	.519	8	37	19	.661
8	8	Oklahoma	12	18	.400	11.5	30	29	.508
9	–	Kansas State	11	18	.379	12	26	29	.473
10	–	Kansas	4	26	.133	19.5	14	40	.259
11	–	Iowa State	2	28	.067	21.5	17	36	.321

- Colorado did not sponsor a baseball team.

== Tournament ==
First round
8	Oklahoma	10
1	Texas A&M	5
5	Nebraska	5
4	Oklahoma State	0
1	Texas A&M	4
4	Oklahoma State	2
2	Baylor	2
7	Missouri	0
6	Texas	7
3	Texas Tech	3
7	Missouri	8*
3	Texas Tech	7*

Second round
8	Oklahoma	7
5	Nebraska	14
1	Texas A&M	10
8	Oklahoma	3
2	Baylor	8
6	Texas	2
7	Missouri	5*
6	Texas	4*

Semifinals
5	Nebraska	8	-
1	Texas A&M	7	-
2	Baylor	9	-
7	Missouri	2	-

Finals
5	Nebraska	4
2	Baylor	3

- * indicates extra-inning game.
- Iowa State, Kansas, and Kansas State did not make the tournament.

== All-Tournament Team ==
Position	Player	School
1B	Ken Harvey	Nebraska
2B	Dustin Barnes	Missouri
3B	Aaron Wilson	Missouri
SS	Steve Scarborough	Texas A&M
C	Josh Bard	Texas Tech
OF	John Cole	Nebraska
OF	Anthony Hensley	Baylor
OF	Bobby Walters	Oklahoma
DH	Richard Park	Oklahoma
P	Chad Wiles	Nebraska
P	Chad Hawkins	Baylor
P	Jason Jennings	Baylor
MOP	Jason Jennings	Baylor

== See also ==
- College World Series
- NCAA Division I Baseball Championship
- Big 12 Conference baseball tournament
