= 1999 Florida State Seminoles baseball team =

American college baseball season

1999 Florida State Seminoles baseball

Atlantic Coast Conference Champions Tallahassee Regional Champions Tallahassee Super Regional Champions

College World Series, Runner-Up
- Conference: Atlantic Coast Conference

Ranking
- Coaches: No. 2
- CB: No. 2
- Record: 57–14 (22–2 ACC)
- Head coach: Mike Martin (20th season)
- Assistant coaches: Chip Baker (15th season); Jamey Shouppe (9th season); Mike Martin Jr. (2nd season)
- Home stadium: Dick Howser Stadium

1999 Atlantic Coast Conference baseball standings
	Conf.				Overall
Team	W		L	PCT	W		L	PCT
No. 2 Florida State ‍†‍‍^{y}	22	–	2	.917	57	–	14	.803
No. 10 Wake Forest ‍‍‡‍^{y}	16	–	7	.696	47	–	16	.746
No. 13 Clemson ‍‍‍^{y}	13	–	10	.565	42	–	27	.609
No. 28 North Carolina ‍‍‍^{y}	13	–	11	.542	41	–	18	.695
Georgia Tech ‍‍‍	12	–	12	.500	38	–	20	.655
NC State ‍‍‍^{y}	11	–	13	.458	37	–	25	.597
Virginia ‍‍‍	8	–	15	.348	21	–	35	.375
Maryland ‍‍‍	6	–	17	.261	23	–	33	.411
Duke ‍‍‍	4	–	18	.182	24	–	31	.436
† – Conference champion ‡ – Tournament champion y – Invited to the NCAA tournament As of June 30, 1999; Rankings from Collegiate Baseball

The 1999 Florida State Seminole baseball team represented Florida State University in the 1999 NCAA Division I baseball season. The Seminoles played their home games at Dick Howser Stadium. The team was coached by Mike Martin in his 20th season at Florida State.

The Seminoles lost the College World Series, defeated by the Miami Hurricanes in the championship game.

== Roster ==
1999 Florida State Seminoles roster
Pitchers: 4 John Bentley - Sophomore; 10 Chris Chavez - Senior; 29 Mike DiBlasi - Junior; 26 Zach Diaz - Senior; 37 Chris Ginn - Sophomore; 16 Jason Hubbard - Freshman; 44 Scott Hudson - RS Sophomore; 41 Jon McDonald - RS Sophomore; 24 Eric Roman - Freshman; 23 Mike Smalley - Sophomore; 15 Chris Smith - Freshman; 30 Nick Stocks - RS Sophomore; 21 Blair Varnes - Freshman; 17 Chris Whidden - Freshman; 13 Nick Whidden - Freshman	Infielders: 6 Kevin Cash - Junior; 33 John Halliday - Junior; 31 Marshall McDougall - Junior; 8 Michael Futrell - Freshman; 1 Brett Groves - Sophomore; 22 Sam Scott - Junior; 7 Bobby Spanos - Freshman; Catchers: 2 Chris Hart - Freshman; 20 J. C. Huguet - Junior; 25 Jeremiah Klosterman - Senior	Outfielders: 27 Ryan Barthelemy - Freshman; 32 Matt Diaz - Sophomore; 39 John-Ford Griffin - Freshman; 9 Karl Jernigan - Sophomore; 14 Clint Thigpen - Freshman; Coaches: 11 Mike Martin - 20th Season; 3 Chip Baker - 15th Season; 12 Jamey Shouppe - 9th Season; 28 Mike Martin Jr.- 2nd Season

== Schedule ==
1999 Florida State Seminoles baseball game log
Regular season (46–10)
January/February (13–2)

Date	Rank	Opponent	Site/stadium	Score	Win	Loss	Attendance	Overall Record	ACC Record
January 29	No. 9	UNC Asheville	Dick Howser Stadium • Tallahassee, FL	W 9–2	McDonald (1–0)	–	2,032	1–0	–
January 30	No. 9	UNC Asheville	Dick Howser Stadium • Tallahassee, FL	W 16–3	Stocks (1–0)	–	2,127	2–0	–
January 31	No. 9	UNC Asheville	Dick Howser Stadium • Tallahassee, FL	W 11–3	Varnes (1–0)	–	853	3–0	–
February 5	No. 9	No. 27 Arizona State	Dick Howser Stadium • Tallahassee, FL	W 4–1	Ginn (1–0)	–	2,361	4–0	–
February 6	No. 9	No. 27 Arizona State	Dick Howser Stadium • Tallahassee, FL	W 11–4	Chavez (1–0)	–	4,023	5–0	–
February 7	No. 9	No. 27 Arizona State	Dick Howser Stadium • Tallahassee, FL	W 7–5	C. Whidden (1–0)	–	2,578	6–0	–
February 12	No. 2	Troy State	Dick Howser Stadium • Tallahassee, FL	W 17–3	Varnes (2–0)	–	834	7–0	–
February 13	No. 2	Troy State	Dick Howser Stadium • Tallahassee, FL	W 21–1	McDonald (2–0)	–	1,018	8–0	–
February 14	No. 2	Troy State	Dick Howser Stadium • Tallahassee, FL	W 10–2	Stocks (2–0)	–	2,578	9–0	–
February 16	No. 1	Charleston Southern	Dick Howser Stadium • Tallahassee, FL	W 12–2	Smalley (1–0)	–	803	10–0	–
February 17	No. 1	Charleston Southern	Dick Howser Stadium • Tallahassee, FL	W 7–2	Varnes (3–0)	–	503	11–0	–
February 20	No. 1	No. 7 Florida	Dick Howser Stadium • Tallahassee, FL	L 5–6	–	Chavez (1–1)	4,841	11–1	–
February 21	No. 1	No. 7 Florida	Dick Howser Stadium • Tallahassee, FL	W 12–3	Stocks (3–0)	–	4,612	12–1	–
February 27	No. 1	at No. 6 Florida	Alfred A. McKethan Stadium • Gainesville, FL	L 2–4	–	Chavez (1–2)	5,657	12–2	–
February 28	No. 1	at No. 6 Florida	Alfred A. McKethan Stadium • Gainesville, FL	W 8–4	Stocks (4–0)	–	5,203	13–2	–

March (17–1)

Date	Rank	Opponent	Site/stadium	Score	Win	Loss	Attendance	Overall Record	ACC Record
March 2	No. 1	South Florida	Dick Howser Stadium • Tallahassee, FL	W 5–2	Varnes (4–0)	–	733	14–2	–
March 5	No. 1	vs No. 17 Wichita State	Metrodome • Minneapolis, MN	L 1–8	–	McDonald (2–1)	579	14–3	–
March 6	No. 1	at Minnesota	Metrodome • Minneapolis, MN	W 9–5	Stocks (5–0)	–	6,293	15–3	–
March 7	No. 1	vs Washington State	Metrodome • Minneapolis, MN	W 8–5	C. Whidden (2–0)	–	243	16–3	–
March 12	No. 2	Virginia	Dick Howser Stadium • Tallahassee, FL	W 10–3	McDonald (3–1)	–	2,246	17–3	1–0
March 13	No. 2	Virginia	Dick Howser Stadium • Tallahassee, FL	W 2–1	Stocks (6–0)	–	1,976	18–3	2–0
March 14	No. 2	Virginia	Dick Howser Stadium • Tallahassee, FL	W 11–3	Varnes (5–0)	–	1,571	19–3	3–0
March 16	No. 1	The Citadel	Dick Howser Stadium • Tallahassee, FL	W 10–6	Ginn (2–0)	–	924	20–3	–
March 17	No. 1	The Citadel	Dick Howser Stadium • Tallahassee, FL	W 8–4	Z. Diaz (1–0)	–	909	21–3	–
March 19	No. 1	at No. 19 NC State	Doak Field • Raleigh, NC	W 14–4	McDonald (4–1)	–	2,243	22–3	4–0
March 20	No. 1	at No. 19 NC State	Doak Field • Raleigh, NC	W 2–1	Stocks (7–0)	–	2,097	23–3	5–0
March 21	No. 1	at No. 19 NC State	Doak Field • Raleigh, NC	W 13–1	Varnes (6–0)	–	2631	24–3	6–0
March 23	No. 1	Akron	Dick Howser Stadium • Tallahassee, FL	W 7–4	Smith (1–0)	–	931	25–3	–
March 24	No. 1	Akron	Dick Howser Stadium • Tallahassee, FL	W 12–2	Smalley (2–0)	–	614	26–3	–
March 26	No. 1	No. 3 North Carolina	Dick Howser Stadium • Tallahassee, FL	W 12–6	McDonald (5–1)	–	3,155	27–3	7–0
March 27	No. 1	No. 3 North Carolina	Dick Howser Stadium • Tallahassee, FL	W 5–4	Chavez (2–2)	–	3,604	28–3	8–0
March 28	No. 1	No. 3 North Carolina	Dick Howser Stadium • Tallahassee, FL	W 9–4	Varnes (7–0)	–	2,891	29–3	9–0
March 30	No. 1	Mercer	Dick Howser Stadium • Tallahassee, FL	W 14–1	Smalley (3–0)	–	1,217	30–3	–

April (8–7)

Date	Rank	Opponent	Site/stadium	Score	Win	Loss	Attendance	Overall Record	ACC Record
April 2	No. 1	No. 23 Wake Forest	Dick Howser Stadium • Tallahassee, FL	W 7–4	Chavez (3–2)	–	2,326	31–3	10–0
April 3	No. 1	No. 23 Wake Forest	Dick Howser Stadium • Tallahassee, FL	W 16–3	Stocks (8–0)	–	2,726	32–3	11–0
April 4	No. 1	No. 23 Wake Forest	Dick Howser Stadium • Tallahassee, FL	W 4–3	Ginn (3–0)	–	1,679	33–3	12–0
April 7	No. 1	Jacksonville	Dick Howser Stadium • Tallahassee, FL	W 8–6	Chavez (4–2)	–	1,397	34–3	–
April 9	No. 1	Clemson	Dick Howser Stadium • Tallahassee, FL	W 8–0	McDonald (6–1)	–	3,543	35–3	13–0
April 10	No. 1	Clemson	Dick Howser Stadium • Tallahassee, FL	L 4–8	–	Stocks (8–1)	5,021	35–4	13–1
April 11	No. 1	Clemson	Dick Howser Stadium • Tallahassee, FL	W 5–3	Chavez (5–2)	–	2,472	36–4	14–1
April 14	No. 1	at Jacksonville	John Sessions Stadium • Jacksonville, FL	W 25–2	Z. Diaz (2–0)	–	1,541	37–4	–
April 16	No. 1	No. 5 Miami (FL)	Dick Howser Stadium • Tallahassee, FL	W 8–2	McDonald (7–1)	–	4,489	38–4	–
April 17	No. 1	No. 5 Miami (FL)	Dick Howser Stadium • Tallahassee, FL	L 3–4	–	C. Whidden (2–1)	5,053	38–5	–
April 18	No. 1	No. 5 Miami (FL)	Dick Howser Stadium • Tallahassee, FL	L 7–8	–	Chavez (5–3)	3,850	38–6	–
April 23	No. 2	at No. 1 Miami (FL)	Mark Light Field • Miami, FL	L 7–8	–	Chavez (5–4)	4,903	38–7	–
April 24	No. 2	at No. 1 Miami (FL)	Mark Light Field • Miami, FL	L 4–9	–	Varnes (7–1)	5,062	38–8	–
April 25	No. 2	at No. 1 Miami (FL)	Mark Light Field • Miami, FL	L 8–9	–	Z. Diaz (1–2)	3,122	38–9	–
April 30	No. 4	at Georgia Tech	Russ Chandler Stadium • Atlanta, GA	L 2–3	–	McDonald (7–2)	1,897	38–10	14–2

May (8–0)

Date	Rank	Opponent	Site/stadium	Score	Win	Loss	Attendance	Overall Record	ACC Record
May 1	No. 4	at Georgia Tech	Russ Chandler Stadium • Atlanta, GA	W 18–4	Varnes (8–1)	–	2,263	39–10	15–2
May 2	No. 4	at Georgia Tech	Russ Chandler Stadium • Atlanta, GA	W 4–2	Chavez (6–4)	–	2,035	40–10	16–2
May 7	No. 4	at Maryland	Shipley Field • College Park, MD	W 9–3	McDonald (8–2)	–	602	41–10	17–2
May 8	No. 4	at Maryland	Shipley Field • College Park, MD	W 13–4	Ginn (4–0)	–	907	42–10	18–2
May 9	No. 4	at Maryland	Shipley Field • College Park, MD	W 26–2	Stocks (9–1)	–	357	43–10	19–2
May 15	No. 4	at Duke	Jack Coombs Field • Durham, NC	W 11–3	Varnes (9–1)	–	323	44–10	20–2
May 15	No. 4	at Duke	Jack Coombs Field • Durham, NC	W 9–1	Stocks (10–1)	–	323	45–10	21–2
May 16	No. 4	at Duke	Jack Coombs Field • Durham, NC	W 7–2	Smalley (4–0)	–	348	46–10	22–2

Postseason (11–4)
ACC Tournament (2–2)

Date	Rank	Opponent	Site/stadium	Score	Win	Loss	Attendance	Overall Record	ACCT Record
May 19	No. 2 (1)	vs (8) Maryland	Durham Bulls Athletic Park • Durham, NC	W 4–1	McDonald (9–2)	–	1,341	47–10	1–0
May 20	No. 2 (1)	vs (5) No. 27 Georgia Tech	Durham Bulls Athletic Park • Durham, NC	W 7–3	Varnes (10–1)	–	1,419	48–10	2–0
May 21	No. 2 (1)	vs (2) No. 15 Wake Forest	Durham Bulls Athletic Park • Durham, NC	L 0–4	–	Stocks (10–2)	4,661	48–11	2–1
May 22	No. 2 (1)	vs (3) No. 19 Clemson	Durham Bulls Athletic Park • Durham, NC	L 7–8	–	Chavez (6–5)	3,742	48–12	2–2

NCAA tournament: Tallahassee Regional (3–0)

Date	Rank	Opponent	Site/stadium	Score	Win	Loss	Attendance	Overall Record	Regional Record
May 28	No. 3 (1)	(4) The Citadel	Dick Howser Stadium • Tallahassee, FL	W 24–6	Varnes (11–1)	–	3,782	49–12	1–0
May 29	No. 3 (1)	(3) Jacksonville	Dick Howser Stadium • Tallahassee, FL	W 9–2	Stocks (11–2)	–	3,726	50–12	2–0
May 30	No. 3 (1)	(2) Providence	Dick Howser Stadium • Tallahassee, FL	W 14–3	Ginn (5–0)	–	3,921	51–12	3–0

NCAA tournament: Tallahassee Super Regional (2–0)

Date	Rank	Opponent	Site/stadium	Score	Win	Loss	Attendance	Overall Record	Super Regional Record
June 4	No. 3 (2)	No. 15 Auburn	Dick Howser Stadium • Tallahassee, FL	W 10–2	Stocks (12–2)	–	5,137	52–12	1–0
June 5	No. 3 (2)	No. 15 Auburn	Dick Howser Stadium • Tallahassee, FL	W 6–3	Z. Diaz (3–1)	–	5,218	53–12	2–0

NCAA tournament: College World Series (4–2)

Date	Rank	Opponent	Site/stadium	Score	Win	Loss	Attendance	Overall Record	CWS Record
June 12	No. 3 (2)	vs (7) No. 6 Texas A&M	Rosenblatt Stadium • Omaha, NE	W 7–3	Chavez (7–5)	–	19,745	54–12	1–0
June 14	No. 3 (2)	vs (6) No. 5 Stanford	Rosenblatt Stadium • Omaha, NE	L 6–10	–	McDonald (9–3)	17,000	54–13	1–1
June 16	No. 3 (2)	vs (3) No. 4 Cal State Fullerton	Rosenblatt Stadium • Omaha, NE	W 7–2	Chavez (8–5)	–	22,155	55–13	2–1
June 17	No. 3 (2)	vs (6) No. 5 Stanford	Rosenblatt Stadium • Omaha, NE	W 8–6	Z. Diaz (4–1)	–	19,021	56–13	3–1
June 18	No. 3 (2)	vs (6) No. 5 Stanford	Rosenblatt Stadium • Omaha, NE	W 14–11	Stocks (13–2)	–	11,600	57–13	4–1
June 19	No. 3 (2)	vs (1) No. 1 Miami (FL)	Rosenblatt Stadium • Omaha, NE	L 5–6	–	Varnes (11–2)	23,563	57–14	4–2

== Awards and honors ==
Marshall McDougall

- College World Series Most Outstanding Player
- Atlantic Coast Conference Baseball Player of the Year
- All-Tournament Team

Matt Diaz

- All-Tournament Team

Jeremiah Klosterman

- All-Tournament Team

Sam Scott

- All-Tournament Team

Chris Chavez

- All-Tournament Team

== Seminoles in the 1999 MLB draft ==
The following members of the Florida State Seminoles baseball program were drafted in the 1999 Major League Baseball draft.

Round	Pick	Player	Position	MLB Club
1	36	Nick Stocks	P	St. Louis Cardinals
17	505	Matt Diaz	OF	Tampa Bay Devil Rays
26	766	Marshall McDougall	2B	Boston Red Sox
27	834	Chris Chavez	P	Atlanta Braves
