= 1999 Atlantic Coast Conference baseball tournament =

American college baseball tournament

- Teams: 9
- Format: Play-in round followed by eight-team double elimination
- Finals site: Durham Bulls Athletic Park; Durham, North Carolina
- Champions: Wake Forest (3rd title)
- Winning coach: George Greer (2nd title)
- MVP: Andrew Riepe (Wake Forest)
- Attendance: 22,777

1999 Atlantic Coast Conference baseball standings
	Conf.				Overall
Team	W		L	PCT	W		L	PCT
No. 2 Florida State ‍†‍‍^{y}	22	–	2	.917	57	–	14	.803
No. 10 Wake Forest ‍‍‡‍^{y}	16	–	7	.696	47	–	16	.746
No. 13 Clemson ‍‍‍^{y}	13	–	10	.565	42	–	27	.609
No. 28 North Carolina ‍‍‍^{y}	13	–	11	.542	41	–	18	.695
Georgia Tech ‍‍‍	12	–	12	.500	38	–	20	.655
NC State ‍‍‍^{y}	11	–	13	.458	37	–	25	.597
Virginia ‍‍‍	8	–	15	.348	21	–	35	.375
Maryland ‍‍‍	6	–	17	.261	23	–	33	.411
Duke ‍‍‍	4	–	18	.182	24	–	31	.436
† – Conference champion ‡ – Tournament champion y – Invited to the NCAA tournament As of June 30, 1999; Rankings from Collegiate Baseball

The 1999 Atlantic Coast Conference baseball tournament was held at the Durham Bulls Athletic Park in Durham, North Carolina, US from May 18 through 22. Wake Forest won the tournament and earned the Atlantic Coast Conference's automatic bid to the 1999 NCAA Division I baseball tournament.

== Tournament ==
=== Play-in game ===
- The two teams with the worst records in regular season conference play faced each other in a single elimination situation to earn the 8th spot in the conference tournament.

Play-in game
9	Duke	2
8	Maryland	4

=== Main bracket ===
==== Seeding procedure ====
From TheACC.com:

On Saturday (The Semifinals) of the ACC Baseball Tournament, the match-up between the four remaining teams is determined by previous opponents. If teams have played previously in the tournament, every attempt will be made to avoid a repeat match-up between teams, regardless of seed. If it is impossible to avoid a match-up that already occurred, then the determination is based on avoiding the most recent, current tournament match-up, regardless of seed. If no match-ups have occurred, the team left in the winners bracket will play the lowest seeded team from the losers bracket.

==== Bracket ====
Upper round 1
8	Maryland	1
1	Florida State	4
5	Georgia Tech	15
4	North Carolina	4
6	NC State	6
3	Clemson	7
7	Virginia	3
2	Wake Forest	4

Upper round 2
1	Florida State	7
5	Georgia Tech	3
2	Wake Forest	6
3	Clemson	3
Lower round 1
4	North Carolina	3
8	Maryland	6
6	NC State	9
7	Virginia	6

Upper final
2	Wake Forest	4
1	Florida State	0
Lower round 2
8	Maryland	6
3	Clemson	7
5	Georgia Tech	6
6	NC State	9

Semifinals
6	NC State	9
2	Wake Forest	11
3	Clemson	8
1	Florida State	7

Final
3	Clemson	5
2	Wake Forest	9

== All-Tournament Team ==
Position	Player	School
1B	Matt Postell	NC State
2B	Brian Ward	NC State
3B	Khalil Greene	Clemson
SS	Chase Voshell	Wake Forest
C	Andrew Riepe	Wake Forest
OF	Patrick Boyd	Clemson
OF	Scott Daeley	Wake Forest
OF	John-Ford Griffin	Florida State
DH	Danny Borrell	Wake Forest
P	Mike MacDougal	Wake Forest
P	Scott Siemon	Wake Forest
P	Dave Bush	Wake Forest
MVP	Andrew Riepe	Wake Forest

(*)Denotes Unanimous Selection

== See also ==
- College World Series
- NCAA Division I Baseball Championship
