= 1999 ACC tournament =

1999 ACC tournament may refer to:

- 1999 ACC men's basketball tournament
- 1999 ACC women's basketball tournament
- 1999 ACC men's soccer tournament
- 1999 ACC women's soccer tournament
- 1999 Atlantic Coast Conference baseball tournament
- 1999 Atlantic Coast Conference softball tournament
