= 1999 Stanford Cardinal baseball team =

American college baseball season

1999 Stanford Cardinal baseball

Pac-10 Conference champions Palo Alto Regional champions Palo Alto Super Regional champions

College World Series, 3rd
- Conference: Pacific 10 Conference

Ranking
- Coaches: No. 3
- CB: No. 3
- Record: 50–15 (19–5 Pac-10)
- Head coach: Mark Marquess (23rd season)
- Home stadium: Sunken Diamond

1999 Pacific-10 Conference baseball standings
	Conf.				Overall
Team	W		L	PCT	W		L	PCT
No. 3 Stanford ‍†‍‍^{y}	19	–	5	.792	50	–	15	.769
No. 12 Southern California ‍‍‍^{y}	17	–	7	.708	36	–	26	.581
Arizona ‍‍‍^{y}	13	–	11	.542	33	–	23	.589
UCLA ‍‍‍^{y}	13	–	11	.542	31	–	33	.484
Arizona State ‍‍‍	12	–	12	.500	39	–	21	.650
Washington ‍‍‍	12	–	12	.500	33	–	23	.589
California ‍‍‍	11	–	13	.458	27	–	31	.466
Oregon State ‍‍‍	7	–	17	.292	19	–	35	.352
Washington State ‍‍‍	4	–	20	.167	24	–	31	.436
† – Conference champion y – Invited to the NCAA tournament As of June 30, 1999; Rankings from Collegiate Baseball

The 1999 Stanford Cardinal baseball team represented Stanford University in the 1999 NCAA Division I baseball season. The Cardinal played their home games at Sunken Diamond. The team was coached by Mark Marquess in his 23rd year at Stanford.

The Cardinal won the Palo Alto Regional and the Palo Alto Super Regional to advanced to the College World Series, where they were defeated by the Florida State Seminoles.

== Roster ==
1999 Stanford Cardinal baseball team
Players
Coaches

#	Pos.	Name	B/T	Height	Weight	Year	Home town
	C	Damien Alvarado	/R	—	—	Jr	Sacramento, California
	OF	Joe Borchard	S/R	6 ft 4 in (1.93 m)	230 lb (104 kg)	So	Camarillo, California
	INF	Eric Bruntlett	R/R	6 ft 0 in (1.83 m)	200 lb (91 kg)	Jr	West Lafayette, Indiana
		Stephen Chan	/	—	—
	LHP	Tony Cogan	L/L	6 ft 2 in (1.88 m)	205 lb (93 kg)	Sr	Highland Park, Illinois
	P	Austin Coose	/	—	—
	OF	Nick Day	/	—	—	Jr	Las Vegas, Nevada
	INF	Scott Dragicevich	R/R	6 ft 3 in (1.91 m)	205 lb (93 kg)		Westlake Village, California
	LHP	Brad Drew	/L	—	—	So	Waterloo, Ontario
	INF	John Gall	R/R	6 ft 0 in (1.83 m)	195 lb (88 kg)	Jr	Mountain View, California
	LHP	Mike Gosling	L/L	6 ft 2 in (1.88 m)	210 lb (95 kg)	Fr	Salt Lake City, Utah
	INF	Josh Hochgesang	R/R	6 ft 3 in (1.91 m)	210 lb (95 kg)	Sr	Fullerton, California
		Billy Jacobson	/	—	—
		Mickey Kammeyer	/	—	—
	OF	Edmund Muth	L/L	6 ft 0 in (1.83 m)	190 lb (86 kg)	Jr	Long Beach, California
	INF	Chris O'Riordan	R/R	5 ft 8 in (1.73 m)	175 lb (79 kg)		San Diego, California
	P	Dan Rich	/	—	—
	INF	Jeff Rizzo	L/R	6 ft 0 in (1.83 m)	190 lb (86 kg)	Jr	San Diego, California
	RHP	Brian Sager	/R	—	—	Fr	Banford, Connecticut
		John Salter	/	—	—	Sr
		Joe Savig	/	—	—
	OF	Craig Thompson	S/R	6 ft 0 in (1.83 m)	190 lb (86 kg)	Jr	Dallas, Texas
	INF	Andy Topham	R/R	6 ft 2 in (1.88 m)	190 lb (86 kg)		Carmichael, California
	P	Jim Vankoski	/	—	—
		Jason VanMeetren	R/R	6 ft 3 in (1.91 m)	200 lb (91 kg)	Fr	Las Vegas, Nevada
		Arik VanZandt	/	—	—
	RHP	Justin Wayne	R/R	6 ft 3 in (1.91 m)	200 lb (91 kg)	So	Honolulu, Hawaii
	P	J. D. Willcox	/	—	—
	RHP	Mike Wodnicki	R/R	6 ft 3 in (1.91 m)	210 lb (95 kg)		Southington, Connecticut
	RHP	Jason Young	R/R	6 ft 5 in (1.96 m)	215 lb (98 kg)	So	Berkeley, California

Head coach

Mark Marquess

Assistant coach(es)

Legend

- (C) Team captain
- (S) Suspended
- (I) Ineligible
- Injured
- Current redshirt

Roster
Last update: January 20, 2021

== Schedule ==
1999 Stanford Cardinal baseball game log: 50–15
Regular season: 43–13
January (1–2)

#	Date	Opponent	Rank	Site/stadium	Score	Overall record	Pac-10 record
1	January 29	Fresno State	No. 8	Sunken Diamond • Stanford, California	W 1–0	1–0	–
2	January 30	Fresno State	No. 8	Sunken Diamond • Stanford, California	L 6–8	1–1	–
3	January 31	Fresno State	No. 8	Sunken Diamond • Stanford, California	L 3–5	1–2	–

February (11–3)

#	Date	Opponent	Rank	Site/stadium	Score	Overall record	Pac-10 record
4	February 5	at No. 11 Cal State Fullerton	No. 8	Titan Field • Fullerton, California	L 0–8	1–3	–
5	February 6	at No. 11 Cal State Fullerton	No. 8	Titan Field • Fullerton, California	W 6–5	2–3	–
6	February 7	at No. 11 Cal State Fullerton	No. 8	Titan Field • Fullerton, California	W 13–7	3–3	–
7	February 10	Saint Mary's	No. 12	Sunken Diamond • Stanford, California	W 5–0	4–3	–
8	February 13	at Santa Clara	No. 12	Stephen Schott Stadium • Santa Clara, California	W 6–2	5–3	–
9	February 14	Santa Clara	No. 12	Sunken Diamond • Stanford, California	W 7–6	6–3	–
10	February 15	at Santa Clara	No. 9	Stephen Schott Stadium • Santa Clara, California	W 7–1	7–3	–
11	February 16	Sacramento State	No. 9	Sunken Diamond • Stanford, California	W 8–1	8–3	–
12	February 19	California	No. 9	Sunken Diamond • Stanford, California	W 9–7	9–3	–
13	February 21	California	No. 9	Sunken Diamond • Stanford, California	W 5–3	10–3	–
14	February 22	California	No. 5	Sunken Diamond • Stanford, California	L 2–3	10–4	–
15	February 26	at Southern California	No. 5	Dedeaux Field • Los Angeles, California	W 10–7	11–4	–
16	February 27	at Southern California	No. 5	Dedeaux Field • Los Angeles, California	W 5–2	12–4	–
17	February 28	at Southern California	No. 5	Dedeaux Field • Los Angeles, California	L 7–9	12–5	–

March (8–3)

#	Date	Opponent	Rank	Site/stadium	Score	Overall record	Pac-10 record
18	March 2	Nevada	No. 4	Sunken Diamond • Stanford, California	L 4–7	12–6	–
19	March 5	No. 9 Arizona State	No. 4	Sunken Diamond • Stanford, California	W 11–1	13–6	1–0
20	March 6	No. 9 Arizona State	No. 4	Sunken Diamond • Stanford, California	W 6–5	14–6	2–0
21	March 7	No. 9 Arizona State	No. 4	Sunken Diamond • Stanford, California	W 11–8	15–6	3–0
22	March 20	at No. 9 Texas	No. 3	Disch–Falk Field • Austin, Texas	L 8–9	15–7	–
23	March 21	at No. 9 Texas	No. 3	Disch–Falk Field • Austin, Texas	W 11–8	16–7	–
24	March 22	at No. 9 Texas	No. 4	Disch–Falk Field • Austin, Texas	L 3–4	16–8	–
25	March 24	at Oklahoma	No. 4	L. Dale Mitchell Baseball Park • Norman, Oklahoma	W 5–1	17–8	–
26	March 26	at Arizona	No. 4	Jerry Kindall Field at Frank Sancet Stadium • Tucson, Arizona	W 8–4	18–8	4–0
27	March 27	at Arizona	No. 4	Jerry Kindall Field at Frank Sancet Stadium • Tucson, Arizona	W 12–4	19–8	5–0
28	March 28	at Arizona	No. 4	Jerry Kindall Field at Frank Sancet Stadium • Tucson, Arizona	W 12–11	20–8	6–0

April (11–4)

#	Date	Opponent	Rank	Site/stadium	Score	Overall record	Pac-10 record
29	April 1	Washington State	No. 3	Sunken Diamond • Stanford, California	W 9–3	21–8	7–0
30	April 2	Washington State	No. 3	Sunken Diamond • Stanford, California	W 6–5	22–8	8–0
31	April 3	Washington State	No. 3	Sunken Diamond • Stanford, California	W 9–0	23–8	9–0
32	April 9	at Washington	No. 2	Husky Ballpark • Seattle, Washington	L 2–3	23–9	9–1
33	April 10	at Washington	No. 2	Husky Ballpark • Seattle, Washington	W 7–4	24–9	10–1
34	April 11	at Washington	No. 2	Husky Ballpark • Seattle, Washington	W 13–10	25–9	11–1
35	April 13	San Francisco	No. 2	Sunken Diamond • Stanford, California	W 7–3	26–9	–
36	April 16	No. 22 Southern California	No. 2	Sunken Diamond • Stanford, California	L 1–10	26–10	11–2
37	April 17	No. 22 Southern California	No. 2	Sunken Diamond • Stanford, California	W 13–2	27–10	12–2
38	April 18	No. 22 Southern California	No. 2	Sunken Diamond • Stanford, California	L 15–17	27–11	12–3
39	April 23	at California	No. 5	Evans Diamond • Berkeley, California	L 9–11	27–12	12–4
40	April 24	at California	No. 5	Evans Diamond • Berkeley, California	W 14–11	28–12	13–4
41	April 25	at California	No. 5	Evans Diamond • Berkeley, California	W 13–5	29–12	14–4
42	April 27	San Jose State	No. 5	Sunken Diamond • Stanford, California	W 8–3	30–12	–
43	April 30	Oregon State	No. 5	Sunken Diamond • Stanford, California	W 7–0	31–12	15–4

May (12–1)

#	Date	Opponent	Rank	Site/stadium	Score	Overall record	Pac-10 record
44	May 1	Oregon State	No. 5	Sunken Diamond • Stanford, California	W 10–5	32–12	16–4
45	May 2	Oregon State	No. 5	Sunken Diamond • Stanford, California	W 9–8	33–12	17–4
46	May 4	at No. 30 Nevada	No. 5	William Peccole Park • Reno, Nevada	W 16–14	34–12	–
47	May 5	Pacific	No. 5	Sunken Diamond • Stanford, California	W 2–1	35–12	–
48	May 7	Saint Mary's	No. 5	Sunken Diamond • Stanford, California	W 4–3	36–12	–
49	May 10	San Francisco	No. 5	Sunken Diamond • Stanford, California	W 16–3	37–12	–
50	May 11	Santa Clara	No. 5	Sunken Diamond • Stanford, California	W 12–5	38–12	–
51	May 14	at UCLA	No. 5	Jackie Robinson Stadium • Los Angeles, California	W 8–7	39–12	18–4
52	May 15	at UCLA	No. 5	Jackie Robinson Stadium • Los Angeles, California	L 7–12	39–13	18–5
53	May 16	at UCLA	No. 5	Jackie Robinson Stadium • Los Angeles, California	W 14–4	40–13	19–5
54	May 20	Cal Poly	No. 5	Sunken Diamond • Stanford, California	W 8–1	41–13	–
55	May 21	Cal Poly	No. 5	Sunken Diamond • Stanford, California	W 13–2	42–13	–
56	May 22	Cal Poly	No. 5	Sunken Diamond • Stanford, California	W 12–9	43–13	–

Postseason: 7–2
NCAA Palo Alto Regional (3–0)

#	Date	Opponent	Seed/Rank	Site/stadium	Score	Overall record	NCAAT record
57	May 28	(4) Loyola Marymount	(1) No. 5	Sunken Diamond • Stanford, California	W 10–2	44–13	1–0
58	May 29	(3) No. 21 North Carolina	(1) No. 5	Sunken Diamond • Stanford, California	W 7–4	45–13	2–0
59	May 30	(2) Nevada	(1) No. 5	Sunken Diamond • Stanford, California	W 7–4	46–13	3–0

NCAA Palo Alto Super Regional (2–0)

#	Date	Opponent	Seed/Rank	Site/stadium	Score	Overall record	NCAAT record
60	June 4	No. 11 Southern California	(6) No. 5	Sunken Diamond • Stanford, California	W 1–0	47–13	4–0
61	June 5	No. 11 Southern California	(6) No. 5	Sunken Diamond • Stanford, California	W 5–3	48–13	5–0

College World Series (2–2)

#	Date	Opponent	Seed/Rank	Site/stadium	Score	Overall record	CWS record
62	June 12	vs. (3) No. 4 Cal State Fullerton	(6) No. 5	Johnny Rosenblatt Stadium • Omaha, Nebraska	W 9–2	49–13	1–0
63	June 14	vs. (2) No. 3 Florida State	(6) No. 5	Johnny Rosenblatt Stadium • Omaha, Nebraska	W 10–6	50–13	2–0
64	June 17	vs. (2) No. 3 Florida State	(6) No. 5	Johnny Rosenblatt Stadium • Omaha, Nebraska	L 6–8	50–14	1–2
65	June 18	vs. (2) No. 3 Florida State	(6) No. 5	Johnny Rosenblatt Stadium • Omaha, Nebraska	L 11–14	50–15	2–2

== Awards and honors ==
Joe Borchard

- All-Pac-10 Conference

John Gall

- All-Pac-10 Conference
- College World Series All-Tournament Team

Josh Hochgesang

- All-Pac-10 Conference

Jason Young

- All-Pac-10 Conference
- First Team All-American National Collegiate Baseball Writers Association
- Second Team All-American Baseball America
- Second Team All-American Collegiate Baseball

Brian Sager

- First Team Freshman All-American Baseball America
- First Team Freshman All-American Collegiate Baseball
