= 1999 Oklahoma State Cowboys baseball team =

American college baseball season

1999 Oklahoma State Cowboys baseball

Wichita Regional champion Wace Super Regional champion

College World Series, T-7th
- Conference: Big 12 Conference

Ranking
- Coaches: No. 8
- CB: No. 8
- Record: 47–20 (19–9 Big 12)
- Head coach: Tom Holliday (3rd season)
- Home stadium: Allie P. Reynolds Stadium

1999 Big 12 Conference baseball standings
	Conf.				Overall
Team	W		L	PCT	W		L	PCT
No. 7 Texas A&M ‍†‍‍^{y}	23	–	6	.793	53	–	17	.757
No. 9 Baylor ‍‍‍^{y}	20	–	7	.741	50	–	15	.769
No. 22 Texas Tech ‍‍‍^{y}	18	–	8	.692	42	–	17	.712
No. 8 Oklahoma State ‍‍‍^{y}	18	–	9	.667	46	–	21	.687
Nebraska ‍‍‡‍^{y}	16	–	9	.640	42	–	18	.700
Texas ‍‍‍^{y}	17	–	13	.567	36	–	26	.581
Missouri ‍‍‍	14	–	13	.519	37	–	19	.661
Oklahoma ‍‍‍	12	–	18	.400	30	–	29	.508
Kansas State ‍‍‍	11	–	18	.379	26	–	29	.473
Kansas ‍‍‍	4	–	26	.133	14	–	40	.259
Iowa State ‍‍‍	2	–	28	.067	17	–	36	.321
† – Conference champion ‡ – Tournament champion y – Invited to the NCAA tournament As of June 30, 1999; Rankings from Collegiate Baseball

The 1999 Oklahoma State Cowboys baseball team represented the Oklahoma State University–Stillwater in the 1999 NCAA Division I baseball season. The Cowboys played their home games at Allie P. Reynolds Stadium. The team was coached by Tom Holliday in his 3rd year as head coach at Oklahoma State.

The Cowboys won the Wichita Regional and Waco Super Regional to advance to the College World Series, where they were defeated by the Rice Owls.

== Roster ==
1999 Oklahoma State Cowboys baseball team
Players
Coaches

#	Pos.	Name	B/T	Height	Weight	Year	Home town
1		Carlos Gautreaux	/	—	—	Jr
2	OF	Toby Rhodes	/	—	—	Fr
3	RHP	Ryan Herrmann	/R	—	—	Fr
4	RHP	Terry Lawrence	/R	—	—	So
5	OF	Garrett Bell	/	—	—	Jr
6		Ryan Budde	/	—	—	Fr
7	INF	Lance Smith	/	—	—	Jr
8	INF	Billy Gasparino	R/R	6 ft 0 in (1.83 m)	190 lb (86 kg)	Sr	Tampa, Florida
9	C	Josh Holliday	S/R	5 ft 11 in (1.8 m)	195 lb (88 kg)	Sr	Stillwater, Oklahoma
10	INF	Trent Kitsch	/	—	—	Jr
12	INF	Mike Myers	/	—	—	Fr
13	RHP	Grant Bergman	/R	—	—	Sr
14	RHP	Jeremy Krismer	/R	—	—	Jr	Tulsa, Oklahoma
15	LHP	Dale Pearson	/L	—	—	Sr	Midwest City, Oklahoma
16	RHP	Frank Bludau	R/R	6 ft 0 in (1.83 m)	200 lb (91 kg)	Jr	Hallettsville, Texas
17	OF	Jimbo McAuliff	/	—	—	So
18	LHP	Stu Hunt	/L	—	—	So	Edmond, Oklahoma
19	OF	Mike Lorsbach	/	—	—	Fr
20	RHP	Rusty Rushing	/R	—	—	Jr
22	INF	Kevin Lucas	/	—	—	Sr	Festus, Missouri
24	INF	Trevor Leu	/	—	—	So
25	INF	Brad Smith	/	—	—	So
27	RHP	Will Rosellini	/	—	—	So
28	C	Casey Eckstein	/	—	—	Jr
29	C	Chris Haggard	/	—	—	Fr
30	OF	Lamont Matthews	/	—	—	Jr	Petersburg, Virginia
32	INF	Jay McCullough	/	—	—	Sr
33	OF	Chris Becerra	L/L	6 ft 0 in (1.83 m)	181 lb (82 kg)	Sr
34	OF	Matt Mabrey	/	—	—	Jr
36	LHP	Matt Smith	L/L	6 ft 5 in (1.96 m)	225 lb (102 kg)	So	Henderson, Nevada
38	RHP	Thom Dreier	R/R	6 ft 4 in (1.93 m)	235 lb (107 kg)	Jr	Union, Missouri
39	LHP	Danny Kelly	/L	—	—	Jr
40	LHP	Denny New	/L	—	—	Jr
44	RHP	David Rollandini	R/R	6 ft 5 in (1.96 m)	220 lb (100 kg)	Sr	Alexandria, Virginia

Head coach

Tom Holliday

Assistant coach(es)

Legend

- (C) Team captain
- (S) Suspended
- (I) Ineligible
- Injured
- Current redshirt

== Schedule ==
1999 Oklahoma State Cowboys baseball game log: 47–20
Regular season: 41–14
February (8–4)

#	Date	Opponent	Rank	Site/stadium	Score	Overall record	Big 12 record
1	February 7	Missouri Southern	No. 19	Allie P. Reynolds Stadium • Stillwater, Oklahoma	W 22–1	1–0	
2	February 13	Milwaukee	No. 20	Allie P. Reynolds Stadium • Stillwater, Oklahoma	W 13–9	2–0	–
3	February 14	Milwaukee	No. 20	Allie P. Reynolds Stadium • Stillwater, Oklahoma	W 24–3	3–0	–
4	February 18	vs. Oregon State	No. 19	Charlie Smith Field • San Diego, California	L 0–1	3–1	–
5	February 19	at San Diego State	No. 19	Charlie Smith Field • San Diego, California	W 12–2	4–1	–
6	February 20	vs. Loyola Marymount	No. 19	Charlie Smith Field • San Diego, California	W 6–2	5–1	–
7	February 21	vs. No. 15 Arizona	No. 19	Charlie Smith Field • San Diego, California	W 7–4	6–1	–
8	February 23	Chicago State	No. 13	Allie P. Reynolds Stadium • Stillwater, Oklahoma	W 25–4	7–1	–
9	February 24	Chicago State	No. 13	Allie P. Reynolds Stadium • Stillwater, Oklahoma	W 36–2	8–1	–
10	February 26	at No. 12 Texas A&M	No. 13	Olsen Field • College Station, Texas	L 3–5	8–2	0–1
11	February 27	at No. 12 Texas A&M	No. 13	Olsen Field • College Station, Texas	L 4–7	8–3	0–2
12	February 28	at No. 12 Texas A&M	No. 13	Olsen Field • College Station, Texas	L 3–4	8–4	0–3

March (12–4)

#	Date	Opponent	Rank	Site/stadium	Score	Overall record	Big 12 record
13	March 2	Prairie View A&M	No. 23	Allie P. Reynolds Stadium • Stillwater, Oklahoma	W 22–3	9–4	–
14	March 3	Prairie View A&M	No. 23	Allie P. Reynolds Stadium • Stillwater, Oklahoma	W 24–0	10–4	–
15	March 5	No. 21 Baylor	No. 23	Allie P. Reynolds Stadium • Stillwater, Oklahoma	L 2–5	10–5	0–4
16	March 6	No. 21 Baylor	No. 23	Allie P. Reynolds Stadium • Stillwater, Oklahoma	W 12–1	11–5	1–4
17	March 7	No. 21 Baylor	No. 23	Allie P. Reynolds Stadium • Stillwater, Oklahoma	L 4–11	11–6	1–5
18	March 9	Arkansas–Pine Bluff	No. 29	Allie P. Reynolds Stadium • Stillwater, Oklahoma	W 22–1	12–6	1–5
19	March 17	at TCU	No. 27	TCU Diamond • Fort Worth, Texas	L 4–5	12–7	–
20	March 19	vs Iowa State	No. 27	Allie P. Reynolds Stadium • Stillwater, Oklahoma	W 19–6	13–7	2–5
21	March 20	vs Iowa State	No. 27	Allie P. Reynolds Stadium • Stillwater, Oklahoma	W 5–4	14–7	3–5
22	March 21	vs Iowa State	No. 27	Allie P. Reynolds Stadium • Stillwater, Oklahoma	W 7–3	15–7	4–5
23	March 23	Arkansas–Little Rock	No. 27	Allie P. Reynolds Stadium • Stillwater, Oklahoma	W 11–5	16–7	–
24	March 24	Arkansas–Little Rock	No. 27	Allie P. Reynolds Stadium • Stillwater, Oklahoma	W 15–2	17–7	–
25	March 26	vs. Harvard	No. 27	Homestead Sports Complex • Homestead, Florida	L 6–10	17–8	–
26	March 27	vs. Dartmouth	No. 27	Homestead Sports Complex • Homestead, Florida	W 17–7	18–8	–
27	March 28	vs. Harvard	No. 27	Homestead Sports Complex • Homestead, Florida	W 4–3	19–8	–
28	March 31	No. 20 Oral Roberts	No. 29	Allie P. Reynolds Stadium • Stillwater, Oklahoma	W 11–5	20–8	–

April (12–5)

#	Date	Opponent	Rank	Site/stadium	Score	Overall record	Big 12 record
29	April 2	Kansas State	No. 29	Allie P. Reynolds Stadium • Stillwater, Oklahoma	W 13–4	21–8	5–5
30	April 3	Kansas State	No. 29	Allie P. Reynolds Stadium • Stillwater, Oklahoma	W 13–2	22–8	6–5
31	April 4	Kansas State	No. 29	Allie P. Reynolds Stadium • Stillwater, Oklahoma	W 15–1	23–8	7–5
32	April 7	No. 26 Oral Roberts	No. 25	Allie P. Reynolds Stadium • Stillwater, Oklahoma	W 12–6	24–8	–
33	April 9	at No. 27 Nebraska	No. 25	Buck Beltzer Stadium • Lincoln, Nebraska	W 10–2	25–8	8–5
34	April 10	at No. 27 Nebraska	No. 25	Buck Beltzer Stadium • Lincoln, Nebraska	L 7–15	25–9	8–6
35	April 11	at No. 27 Nebraska	No. 25	Buck Beltzer Stadium • Lincoln, Nebraska	L 2–6	25–10	8–7
36	April 13	TCU	No. 29	Allie P. Reynolds Stadium • Stillwater, Oklahoma	W 21–9	26–10	–
37	April 17	at Kansas	No. 29	Hoglund Ballpark • Lawrence, Kansas	W 16–10	27–10	9–7
38	April 18	at Kansas	No. 29	Hoglund Ballpark • Lawrence, Kansas	W 12–10	28–10	10–7
39	April 18	at Kansas	No. 29	Hoglund Ballpark • Lawrence, Kansas	W 6–1	29–10	11–7
40	April 20	at NC State	No. 28	Doak Field • Raleigh, North Carolina	L 6–9	29–11	–
41	April 21	at NC State	No. 28	Doak Field • Raleigh, North Carolina	W 4–1	30–11	–
42	April 23	BYU	No. 28	Allie P. Reynolds Stadium • Stillwater, Oklahoma	W 20–15	31–11	–
43	April 24	BYU	No. 28	Allie P. Reynolds Stadium • Stillwater, Oklahoma	W 6–4	32–11	–
44	April 27	Texas–Pan American	No. 25	Allie P. Reynolds Stadium • Stillwater, Oklahoma	L 2–5	32–12	–
45	April 30	vs. Oklahoma	No. 25	Drillers Stadium • Tulsa, Oklahoma	L 3–4	32–13	11–8

May (9–1)

#	Date	Opponent	Rank	Site/stadium	Score	Overall record	Big 12 record
46	May 1	vs. Oklahoma	No. 25	Southwestern Bell Park • Oklahoma City, Oklahoma	W 9–6	33–13	12–8
47	May 2	vs. Oklahoma	No. 25	Southwestern Bell Park • Oklahoma City, Oklahoma	W 6–5	34–13	13–8
48	May 7	No. 21 Texas	No. 27	Allie P. Reynolds Stadium • Stillwater, Oklahoma	W 9–6	35–13	14–8
49	May 8	No. 21 Texas	No. 27	Allie P. Reynolds Stadium • Stillwater, Oklahoma	W 8–5	36–13	15–8
50	May 9	No. 21 Texas	No. 27	Allie P. Reynolds Stadium • Stillwater, Oklahoma	W 13–1	37–13	16–8
51	May 11	Oklahoma	No. 20	Allie P. Reynolds Stadium • Stillwater, Oklahoma	L 9–10	37–14	16–9
52	May 12	Hillsdale	No. 20	Allie P. Reynolds Stadium • Stillwater, Oklahoma	W 16–4	38–14	–
53	May 14	at No. 17 Texas Tech	No. 20	Dan Law Field • Lubbock, Texas	W 4–3	39–14	17–9
54	May 15	at No. 17 Texas Tech	No. 20	Dan Law Field • Lubbock, Texas	W 12–3	40–14	18–9
55	May 16	at No. 17 Texas Tech	No. 20	Dan Law Field • Lubbock, Texas	W 12–11	41–14	19–9

Postseason: 6–6
Big 12 Conference Tournament (0–2)

#	Date	Opponent	Seed/Rank	Site/stadium	Score	Overall record	Big12T record
56	May 19	vs. (5) No. 24 Nebraska	(4) No. 17	Southwestern Bell Park • Oklahoma City, Oklahoma	L 0–5	41–15	0–1
57	May 20	vs. (1) No. 6 Texas A&M	(4) No. 17	Southwestern Bell Park • Oklahoma City, Oklahoma	L 2–4	41–16	0–2

NCAA Wichita Regional (4–1)

#	Date	Opponent	Seed/Rank	Site/stadium	Score	Overall record	NCAAT record
58	May 28	vs. (3) UCLA	(2) No. 20	Eck Stadium • Wichita, Kansas	L 6–12	41–17	0–1
59	May 29	vs. (4) No. 26 Oral Roberts	(2) No. 20	Eck Stadium • Wichita, Kansas	W 12–4	42–17	1–1
60	May 29	vs. (3) UCLA	(2) No. 20	Eck Stadium • Wichita, Kansas	W 17–10	43–17	2–1
60	May 30	vs. (1) No. 7 Wichita State	(2) No. 20	Eck Stadium • Wichita, Kansas	W 11–8	44–17	3–1
61	May 30	vs. (1) No. 7 Wichita State	(2) No. 20	Eck Stadium • Wichita, Kansas	W 7–6	45–17	4–1

NCAA Waco Super Regional (2–1)

#	Date	Opponent	Rank	Site/stadium	Score	Overall record	NCAAT record
62	June 4	vs. (4) No. 8 Baylor	No. 14	Baylor Ballpark • Waco, Texas	W 18–11	46–17	5–1
63	June 5	vs. (4) No. 8 Baylor	No. 14	Baylor Ballpark • Waco, Texas	L 7–17	46–18	5–2
64	June 6	vs. (4) No. 8 Baylor	No. 14	Baylor Ballpark • Waco, Texas	W 6–2	47–18	6–2

College World Series (0–2)

#	Date	Opponent	Rank	Site/stadium	Score	Overall record	CWS record
65	June 11	vs. (5) No. 7 Alabama	No. 8	Johnny Rosenblatt Stadium • Omaha, Nebraska	L 3–11	47–19	0–1
66	June 13	vs. (8) No. 2 Rice	No. 8	Johnny Rosenblatt Stadium • Omaha, Nebraska	L 2–7	47–20	0–2

== Awards and honors ==
Ryan Budde

- Freshman All-American Collegiate Baseball

Thom Dreier

- Honorable Mention All-Big 12 Conference

Billy Gasparino

- First Team All-Big 12 Conference
- Second Team All-American Collegiate Baseball
- Third Team All-American National Collegiate Baseball Writers Association

Josh Holliday

- First Team All-Big 12 Conference
- Third Team All-American National Collegiate Baseball Writers Association

Jeremy Krismer

- Honorable Mention All-Big 12 Conference

Kevin Lucas

- Second Team All-Big 12 Conference

Lamont Matthews

- First Team All-Big 12 Conference
- Second Team All-American American Baseball Coaches Association
- Third Team All-American Baseball America
- Third Team All-American Collegiate Baseball

Jay McCullough

- Honorable Mention All-Big 12 Conference

Rusty Rushing

- Honorable Mention All-Big 12 Conference

Matt Smith

- First Team All-Big 12 Conference
- Second Team All-American National Collegiate Baseball Writers Association
