= 1999 Texas A&M Aggies baseball team =

American college baseball season

1999 Texas A&M Aggies baseball

Big 12 Conference champions Regional champions Super Regional champions

College World Series, T-7th
- Conference: Big 12 Conference

Ranking
- Coaches: No. 7
- CB: No. 7
- Record: 53–17 (23–6 Big 12)
- Head coach: Mark Johnson (15th season)
- MVP: John Scheschuk
- Captains: Steve Leonard; John Scheschuk
- Home stadium: Olsen Field

1999 Big 12 Conference baseball standings
	Conf.				Overall
Team	W		L	PCT	W		L	PCT
No. 7 Texas A&M ‍†‍‍^{y}	23	–	6	.793	53	–	17	.757
No. 9 Baylor ‍‍‍^{y}	20	–	7	.741	50	–	15	.769
No. 22 Texas Tech ‍‍‍^{y}	18	–	8	.692	42	–	17	.712
No. 8 Oklahoma State ‍‍‍^{y}	18	–	9	.667	46	–	21	.687
Nebraska ‍‍‡‍^{y}	16	–	9	.640	42	–	18	.700
Texas ‍‍‍^{y}	17	–	13	.567	36	–	26	.581
Missouri ‍‍‍	14	–	13	.519	37	–	19	.661
Oklahoma ‍‍‍	12	–	18	.400	30	–	29	.508
Kansas State ‍‍‍	11	–	18	.379	26	–	29	.473
Kansas ‍‍‍	4	–	26	.133	14	–	40	.259
Iowa State ‍‍‍	2	–	28	.067	17	–	36	.321
† – Conference champion ‡ – Tournament champion y – Invited to the NCAA tournament As of June 30, 1999; Rankings from Collegiate Baseball

The 1999 Texas A&M Aggies baseball team represented Texas A&M University in the 1999 NCAA Division I baseball season. The Aggies played their home games at Olsen Field. The team was coached by Mark Johnson in his 9th year at Texas A&M.

The Aggies won the College Station Regional and the College Station Super Regional to advance to the College World Series, where they were defeated by the Cal State Fullerton Titans.

== Roster ==
1999 Texas A&M Aggies baseball team
Players
Coaches

#	Pos.	Name	B/T	Height	Weight	Year	Home town
1		Chris Russ	R/R	5 ft 11 in (1.8 m)	167 lb (76 kg)	So	Kerrville, Texas
3	INF	Ty Garner	R/R	5 ft 10 in (1.78 m)	181 lb (82 kg)	Fr	Kingwood, Texas
4	INF	Blake Whealy	R/R	5 ft 11 in (1.8 m)	177 lb (80 kg)	Fr	River Forest, Illinois
5	INF	Ken Sundstrom	L/R	6 ft 2 in (1.88 m)	171 lb (78 kg)	Sr	La Palma, California
6		Steve Scarborough	R/R	5 ft 9 in (1.75 m)	158 lb (72 kg)	Jr	Duncanville, Texas
8	OF	Steve Truitt	S/R	5 ft 9 in (1.75 m)	182 lb (83 kg)	Jr	Missouri City, Texas
9	INF	Sean Heaney	R/R	5 ft 10 in (1.78 m)	190 lb (86 kg)	Jr	Dallas, Texas
10	INF	Erik Sobek	R/R	6 ft 0 in (1.83 m)	196 lb (89 kg)	Sr	Irvine, California
11	INF	Brady Minyard	R/R	6 ft 1 in (1.85 m)	163 lb (74 kg)	So	Beaumont, Texas
12	RHP	Chance Caple	R/R	6 ft 6 in (1.98 m)	215 lb (98 kg)	Jr	Southlake, Texas
13	LHP	Shane King	S/L	6 ft 2 in (1.88 m)	201 lb (91 kg)	Sr	Burleson, Texas
14	OF	Chad Hudson	L/L	5 ft 10 in (1.78 m)	178 lb (81 kg)	Jr	Dallas, Texas
15	LHP	Casey Fossum	S/L	6 ft 0 in (1.83 m)	150 lb (68 kg)	Jr	Waco, Texas
16	INF	Dell Lindsey	R/R	6 ft 0 in (1.83 m)	188 lb (85 kg)	Jr	Houston, Texas
17	OF	Daylan Holt	R/R	6 ft 1 in (1.85 m)	200 lb (91 kg)	So	Mesquite, Texas
20	C	Joe O'Jibway	R/R	5 ft 11 in (1.8 m)	175 lb (79 kg)	Jr	Lubbock, Texas
21	OF	Tommy Clark	R/R	6 ft 0 in (1.83 m)	225 lb (102 kg)	Jr	Pflugerville, Texas
22	C	Shawn Schumacher	L/R	6 ft 1 in (1.85 m)	196 lb (89 kg)	Sr	Carthage, Texas
23	C	Andrew Gonzalez	R/R	5 ft 10 in (1.78 m)	180 lb (82 kg)	Fr	Corpus Christi, Texas
24	C	Brent Howell	R/R	6 ft 0 in (1.83 m)	189 lb (86 kg)	RS Fr	Boerne, Texas
26	RHP	Derrick Adams	R/R	6 ft 1 in (1.85 m)	179 lb (81 kg)	Jr	Richardson, Texas
27	INF	Neal Stephenson	L/L	6 ft 1 in (1.85 m)	196 lb (89 kg)	Fr	Houston, Texas
28	RHP	Courtney Weller	R/R	6 ft 1 in (1.85 m)	163 lb (74 kg)	Jr	Missoula, Montana
29	RHP	Khalid Ballouli	R/R	6 ft 2 in (1.88 m)	169 lb (77 kg)	Fr	Austin, Texas
30	LHP	Matt Ward	L/L	6 ft 0 in (1.83 m)	176 lb (80 kg)	Sr	Irvine, California
32	INF	Steve Leonard (C)	R/R	6 ft 2 in (1.88 m)	206 lb (93 kg)	Sr	San Antonio, Texas
33	INF	John Scheschuk (C)	L/L	6 ft 1 in (1.85 m)	212 lb (96 kg)	Sr	Houston, Texas
34	RHP	Chris Scarcella	R/R	6 ft 1 in (1.85 m)	216 lb (98 kg)	So	League City, Texas
35	RHP	Matt Tucek	R/R	6 ft 3 in (1.91 m)	193 lb (88 kg)	Fr	Waxahachie, Texas
40	RHP	Chris Fulbright	S/R	6 ft 1 in (1.85 m)	207 lb (94 kg)	Jr	Libertyville, Illinois
42	RHP	Kyle Holle	L/R	6 ft 4 in (1.93 m)	203 lb (92 kg)	Sr	Brenham, Texas
44	INF	Greg Porter	R/R	6 ft 4 in (1.93 m)	225 lb (102 kg)	Fr	Keller, Texas
45	LHP	Matt Knight	L/L	6 ft 4 in (1.93 m)	205 lb (93 kg)	Jr	Hallsville, Texas

Head coach

7 Mark Johnson

Assistant coach(es)

Legend

- (C) Team captain
- (S) Suspended
- (I) Ineligible
- Injured
- Current redshirt

Roster
Last update: October 26, 2020

== Schedule ==
1999 Texas A&M Aggies baseball game log: 53–17
Regular season: 45–11
February (12–2)

#	Date	Opponent	Rank	Site/stadium	Score	Overall record	Big 12 record
1	February 5	Texas–Pan American	No. 17	Olsen Field • College Station, Texas	W 12–2	1–0	–
2	February 6	Texas–Pan American	No. 17	Olsen Field • College Station, Texas	W 15–1	2–0	–
3	February 6	Texas–Pan American	No. 17	Olsen Field • College Station, Texas	W 21–5	3–0	–
4	February 12	at No. 21 Arizona	No. 15	Jerry Kindall Field at Frank Sancet Stadium • Tucson, Arizona	L 5–11	3–1	–
5	February 13	at No. 21 Arizona	No. 15	Jerry Kindall Field at Frank Sancet Stadium • Tucson, Arizona	L 2–5	3–2	–
6	February 14	at No. 21 Arizona	No. 15	Jerry Kindall Field at Frank Sancet Stadium • Tucson, Arizona	W 18–9	4–2	–
7	February 16	Southwest Texas State	No. 17	Olsen Field • College Station, Texas	W 11–4	5–2	–
8	February 20	UT Arlington	No. 17	Olsen Field • College Station, Texas	W 8–0	6–2	–
9	February 20	UT Arlington	No. 17	Olsen Field • College Station, Texas	W 12–0	7–2	–
10	February 21	UT Arlington	No. 17	Olsen Field • College Station, Texas	W 7–1	8–2	–
11	February 23	at Sam Houston State	No. 12	Holleman Field • Huntsville, Texas	W 7–3	9–2	–
12	February 26	No. 13 Oklahoma State	No. 12	Olsen Field • College Station, Texas	W 5–3	10–2	1–0
13	February 27	No. 13 Oklahoma State	No. 12	Olsen Field • College Station, Texas	W 7–4	11–2	2–0
14	February 28	No. 13 Oklahoma State	No. 12	Olsen Field • College Station, Texas	W 4–3	12–2	3–0

March (13–6)

#	Date	Opponent	Rank	Site/stadium	Score	Overall record	Big 12 record
15	March 2	at UTSA	No. 7	Roadrunner Field • San Antonio, Texas	L 9–10	12–3	–
16	March 5	Iowa State	No. 7	Olsen Field • College Station, Texas	W 8–3	13–3	4–0
17	March 6	Iowa State	No. 7	Olsen Field • College Station, Texas	W 6–1	14–3	5–0
18	March 7	Iowa State	No. 7	Olsen Field • College Station, Texas	W 14–1	15–3	6–0
19	March 9	at Houston	No. 6	Cougar Field • Houston, Texas	W 8–7	16–3	–
20	March 14	at No. 21 Texas Tech	No. 6	Dan Law Field • Lubbock, Texas	L 4–5	16–4	6–1
21	March 14	at No. 21 Texas Tech	No. 6	Dan Law Field • Lubbock, Texas	L 1–9	16–5	6–2
22	March 17	at Southwest Texas State	No. 11	Bobcat Field • San Marcos, Texas	W 13–4	17–5	–
23	March 19	UNLV	No. 11	Olsen Field • College Station, Texas	L 3–14	17–6	–
24	March 20	Michigan	No. 11	Olsen Field • College Station, Texas	W 6–4	18–6	–
25	March 20	Cal State Northridge	No. 11	Olsen Field • College Station, Texas	W 7–0	19–6	–
26	March 21	Michigan	No. 11	Olsen Field • College Station, Texas	W 8–2	20–6	–
27	March 22	Cal State Northridge	No. 16	Olsen Field • College Station, Texas	W 12–9	21–6	–
28	March 22	UNLV	No. 16	Olsen Field • College Station, Texas	W 5–4	22–6	–
29	March 24	Lamar	No. 16	Olsen Field • College Station, Texas	W 7–2	23–6	–
30	March 26	at Missouri	No. 16	Simmons Field • Columbia, Missouri	W 2–1	24–6	7–2
31	March 27	at Missouri	No. 16	Simmons Field • Columbia, Missouri	L 8–12	24–7	7–3
32	March 28	at Missouri	No. 16	Simmons Field • Columbia, Missouri	W 6–3	25–7	8–3
33	March 30	at No. 9 Rice	No. 17	Cameron Field • Houston, Texas	L 6–7	25–8	–

April (16–2)

#	Date	Opponent	Rank	Site/stadium	Score	Overall record	Big 12 record
34	April 2	No. 19 Nebraska	No. 17	Olsen Field • College Station, Texas	W 14–4	26–8	9–3
35	April 3	No. 19 Nebraska	No. 17	Olsen Field • College Station, Texas	W 16–5	27–8	10–3
36	April 3	No. 19 Nebraska	No. 17	Olsen Field • College Station, Texas	W 3–2	28–8	11–3
37	April 6	Sam Houston State	No. 12	Olsen Field • College Station, Texas	W 15–4	29–8	–
38	April 9	at Kansas State	No. 12	KSU Baseball Stadium • Manhattan, Kansas	W 3–0	30–8	12–3
39	April 10	at Kansas State	No. 12	KSU Baseball Stadium • Manhattan, Kansas	W 15–3	31–8	13–3
40	April 11	at Kansas State	No. 12	KSU Baseball Stadium • Manhattan, Kansas	W 7–2	32–8	14–3
41	April 13	UTSA	No. 12	Olsen Field • College Station, Texas	W 12–11	33–8	14–3
42	April 16	at No. 8 Baylor	No. 12	Baylor Ballpark • Waco, Texas	L 2–7	33–9	14–4
43	April 17	at No. 8 Baylor	No. 12	Baylor Ballpark • Waco, Texas	W 5–4	34–9	15–4
44	April 18	at No. 8 Baylor	No. 12	Baylor Ballpark • Waco, Texas	W 11–10	35–9	16–4
45	April 19	Tarleton State	No. 7	Olsen Field • College Station, Texas	W 7–2	36–9	–
46	April 20	Houston	No. 7	Olsen Field • College Station, Texas	W 15–5	37–9	–
47	April 23	Kansas	No. 7	Olsen Field • College Station, Texas	W 8–1	38–9	17–4
48	April 24	Kansas	No. 7	Olsen Field • College Station, Texas	W 12–5	39–9	18–4
49	April 25	Kansas	No. 7	Olsen Field • College Station, Texas	W 10–3	40–9	19–4
50	April 27	Sam Houston State	No. 6	Olsen Field • College Station, Texas	W 14–10	41–9	–
51	April 30	No. 20 Texas	No. 6	Olsen Field • College Station, Texas	L 6–18	41–10	19–5

May (3–2)

#	Date	Opponent	Rank	Site/stadium	Score	Overall record	Big 12 record
52	May 1	at No. 20 Texas	No. 6	Disch–Falk Field • Austin, Texas	W 10–6	42–10	20–5
53	May 2	at No. 20 Texas	No. 6	Disch–Falk Field • Austin, Texas	W 10–1	43–10	21–5
54	May 14	at Oklahoma	No. 6	L. Dale Mitchell Baseball Park • Norman, Oklahoma	W 9–3	44–10	22–5
55	May 15	at Oklahoma	No. 6	L. Dale Mitchell Baseball Park • Norman, Oklahoma	L 12–13	44–11	22–6
56	May 16	at Oklahoma	No. 6	L. Dale Mitchell Baseball Park • Norman, Oklahoma	W 9–5	45–11	23–6

Postseason: 8–6
Big 12 Conference Tournament (2–2)

#	Date	Opponent	Seed/Rank	Site/stadium	Score	Overall record	B12T record
57	May 19	vs. (8) Oklahoma	(1) No. 6	Bricktown Ballpark • Oklahoma City, Oklahoma	L 5–10	45–12	0–1
58	May 20	vs. (4) No. 17 Oklahoma State	(1) No. 6	Bricktown Ballpark • Oklahoma City, Oklahoma	W 4–2	46–12	1–1
59	May 21	vs. (8) Oklahoma	(1) No. 6	Bricktown Ballpark • Oklahoma City, Oklahoma	W 10–3	47–12	2–1
60	May 22	vs. (5) No. 24 Nebraska	(1) No. 6	Bricktown Ballpark • Oklahoma City, Oklahoma	L 7–8	47–13	2–2

NCAA College Station Regional (4–1)

#	Date	Opponent	Seed/Rank	Site/stadium	Score	Overall record	NCAAT record
61	May 28	(4) Monmouth	(1) No. 6	Olsen Field • College Station, Texas	W 6–0	48–13	1–0
62	May 29	(2) No. 29 Long Beach State	(1) No. 6	Olsen Field • College Station, Texas	L 5–7	48–14	1–1
63	May 29	(3) Ole Miss	(1) No. 6	Olsen Field • College Station, Texas	W 13–7	49–14	2–1
64	May 30	(2) No. 29 Long Beach State	(1) No. 6	Olsen Field • College Station, Texas	W 9–5	50–14	3–1
65	May 30	(2) No. 29 Long Beach State	(1) No. 6	Olsen Field • College Station, Texas	W 17–7	51–14	4–1

NCAA College Station Super Regional (2–1)

#	Date	Opponent	Seed/Rank	Site/stadium	Score	Overall record	Big 12 record
66	June 4	No. 12 Clemson	(7) No. 6	Olsen Field • College Station, Texas	W 20–3	52–14	5–1
67	June 5	No. 12 Clemson	(7) No. 6	Olsen Field • College Station, Texas	L 3–10	52–15	5–2
68	June 6	No. 12 Clemson	(7) No. 6	Olsen Field • College Station, Texas	W 5–4	53–15	6–2

College World Series (0–2)

#	Date	Opponent	Seed/Rank	Site/stadium	Score	Overall record	CWS record
69	June 12	vs. (2) No. 3 Florida State	(7) No. 6	Johnny Rosenblatt Stadium • Omaha, Nebraska	L 3–7	53–16	0–1
70	June 14	vs. (3) No. 4 Cal State Fullerton	(7) No. 6	Johnny Rosenblatt Stadium • Omaha, Nebraska	L 2–4	53–17	0–2

== Awards and honors ==
Daylan Holt

- First Team All-Big 12 Conference

Casey Fossum

- First Team All-Big 12 Conference

Chris Russ

- Second Team All-American Collegiate Baseball Newspaper
- Third Team All-American Baseball America
- Third Team All-American National Collegiate Baseball Writers Association
- First Team All-Big 12 Conference

Steve Scarborough

- Second Team All-Big 12 Conference
- All-Big 12 Conference Tournament Team

John Scheschuk

- Second Team All-Big 12 Conference

Shawn Schumacher

- Third Team All-American National Collegiate Baseball Writers Association
- Second Team All-Big 12 Conference

Steven Truitt

- Second Team All-Big 12 Conference
