= 1999 NCAA Division I baseball rankings =

1999 NCAA Division I baseball season

Tournament

College World Series
- Champions: Miami (FL)
- Runners-up: Florida State
- MOP: Marshall McDougall (Florida State)

Seasons
- ← 1998 2000 →

The following polls make up the 1999 NCAA Division I baseball rankings. USA Today and ESPN began publishing the Coaches' Poll of 31 active coaches ranking the top 25 teams in the nation in 1992. Each coach is a member of the American Baseball Coaches Association. Baseball America began publishing its poll of the top 20 teams in college baseball in 1981. Beginning with the 1985 season, it expanded to the top 25. Collegiate Baseball Newspaper published its first human poll of the top 20 teams in college baseball in 1957, and expanded to rank the top 30 teams in 1961.

== USA Today/ESPN Coaches' Poll ==
Currently, only the final poll from the 1999 season is available.

Rank	Team
1	Miami (FL)
2	Florida State
3	Stanford
4	Alabama
5	Rice
6	Cal State Fullerton
7	Texas A&M
8	Oklahoma State
9	Baylor
10	Wake Forest
11	Auburn
12	Ohio State
13	Southern California
14	Clemson
15	Wichita State
16	LSU
17	Pepperdine
18	Southwestern Louisiana
19	Tulane
20	Arkansas
21	Texas Tech
22	Florida Atlantic
23	East Carolina
24	Mississippi State
25	Nebraska

== Baseball America ==
Currently, only the final poll from the 1999 season is available.

Rank	Team
1	Miami (FL)
2	Florida State
3	Stanford
4	Alabama
5	Rice
6	Cal State Fullerton
7	Texas A&M
8	Baylor
9	Oklahoma State
10	Southern California
11	Wake Forest
12	Ohio State
13	Auburn
14	Wichita State
15	Tulane
16	LSU
17	Clemson
18	Pepperdine
19	East Carolina
20	Southwestern Louisiana
21	Florida Atlantic
22	Providence
23	Arkansas
24	Houston
25	Nebraska

== Collegiate Baseball ==
	Preseason Dec 17	Week 1 Feb 8	Week 2 Feb 15	Week 3 Feb 22	Week 4 Mar 1	Week 5 Mar 8	Week 6 Mar 15	Week 7 Mar 22	Week 8 Mar 29	Week 9 Apr 5	Week 10 Apr 12	Week 11 Apr 19	Week 12 Apr 26	Week 13 May 3	Week 14 May 10	Week 15 May 17	Week 16 May 24	Week 17 May 31	Week 18 June 7	Week 19 June 21	
1.	Wichita State	Wichita State (0–0)	Florida State (9–0)	Florida State (12–1)	Florida State (13–2)	Rice (20–3)	Florida State (19–3)	Florida State (24–3)	Florida State (29–3)	Florida State (33–3)	Florida State (36–4)	Miami (FL) (28–9)	Miami (FL) (31–9)	Miami (FL) (33–10)	Cal State Fullerton (43–9)	Miami (FL) (39–12)	Miami (FL) (41–13)	Miami (FL) (44–13)	Miami (FL) (46–13)	Miami (FL) (50–13)	1.
2.	Georgia Tech	Florida State (6–0)	Wichita State (3–1)	Rice (13–2)	Rice (16–3)	Florida State (16–3)	Auburn (22–3)	Auburn (25–3)	Auburn (27–4)	Stanford (23–8)	Stanford (25–9)	Florida State (38–6)	Cal State Fullerton (37–18)	Cal State Fullerton (40–9)	Miami (FL) (35–11)	Florida State (46–10)	Rice (52–11)	Rice (56–12)	Rice (58–13)	Florida State (57–14)	2.
3.	Southern California	Rice (6–1)	Rice (9–2)	Texas (10–3)	Miami (FL) (12–3)	Auburn (18–2)	Stanford (15–6)	North Carolina (20–2)	Stanford (20–8)	Pepperdine (30–3)	Pepperdine (31–4)	Cal State Fullerton (33–8)	Rice (43–8)	Rice (46–10)	Rice (46–10)	Rice (48–11)	Florida State (48–12)	Florida State (51–12)	Florida State (53–12)	Stanford (50–15)	3.
4.	Rice	Long Beach State (2–1)	Auburn (7–0)	Miami (FL) (9–3)	Stanford (12–5)	Stanford (15–6)	Miami (FL) (17–5)	Stanford (26–7)	Pepperdine (27–3)	Cal State Fullerton (27–6)	Cal State Fullerton (29–7)	Rice (39–8)	Florida State (38–9)	Florida State (40–10)	Florida State (43–10)	Cal State Fullerton (44–11)	Cal State Fullerton (44–11)	Cal State Fullerton (47–11)	Cal State Fullerton (49–12)	Alabama (53–16)	4.
5.	Long Beach State	Auburn (6–0)	Texas (7–2)	Stanford (10–3)	Auburn (13–2)	Florida (10–4)	North Carolina (17–1)	Pepperdine (23–3)	Cal State Fullerton (25–5)	Miami (FL) 24–7)	Miami (FL) (26–8)	Stanford (27–11)	Stanford (29–12)	Stanford (33–12)	Stanford (36–12)	Stanford (40–13)	Stanford (43–13)	Stanford (46–13)	Stanford (48–13)	Rice (59–15)	5.
6.	Miami (FL)	Florida (2–0)	Miami (FL) (5–3)	Florida (3–3)	Florida (5–4)	Texas A&M (15–3)	Pepperdine (20–2)	Miami (FL) (20–6)	Miami (FL) (22–6)	Rice (32–7)	Auburn (26–8)	Mississippi State (31–8)	Texas A&M (39–10)	Texas A&M (42–11)	Texas A&M (42–11)	Texas A&M (44–12)	Texas A&M (46–14)	Texas A&M (50–15)	Texas A&M (52–16)	Cal State Fullerton (50–14)	6.
7.	LSU	LSU (0–0)	Florida (2–2)	Auburn (9–2)	Texas A&M (12–2)	FIU (20–0)	Rice (22–5)	Rice (25–6)	Georgia Tech (23–6)	Mississippi State (24–6)	Mississippi State (28–7)	Texas A&M (35–9)	Wichita State (39–9)	Wichita State (44–10)	Wichita State (49–11)	Wichita State (53–12)	Wichita State (57–12)	Alabama (49–14)	Alabama (51–14)	Texas A&M (52–18)	7.
8.	Stanford	Miami (FL) (3–2)	LSU (1–2)	LSU (4–2)	LSU (8–2)	Miami (FL) (14–5)	LSU (15–4)	Cal State Fullerton (21–5)	North Carolina (22–5)	Auburn (28–6)	Baylor (33–7)	Wichita State (35–8)	Baylor (39–10)	Baylor (41–11)	Arkansas (35–18)	Arkansas (37–19)	Arkansas (41–21)	Baylor (49–13)	Oklahoma State (46–19)	Oklahoma State (46–21)	8.
9.	Florida State	Southern California (1–3)	Stanford (6–3)	Long Beach State (5–4)	Arizona State (19–5)	LSU (12–3)	Texas (18–7)	Texas (20–8)	Rice (28–7)	Georgia Tech (24–8)	Rice (35–8)	Pepperdine (32–7)	North Carolina (37–9)	Arkansas (32–18)	Baylor (41–11)	Baylor (43–12)	Alabama (46–14)	Wake Forest (47–14)	Baylor (50–15)	Baylor (50–15)	9.
10.	Alabama	Alabama (0–0)	Long Beach State (3–3)	Cal State Fullerton (8–3)	Texas (11–6)	Texas (15–6)	Georgia Tech (16–5)	Georgia Tech (28–6)	Florida (21–8)	Baylor (29–6)	Florida Atlantic (39–1)	Arkansas (29–13)	Pepperdine (34–8)	North Carolina (37–10)	Ohio State (43–8)	Alabama (42–14)	Baylor (46–13)	Ohio State (49–12)	Wake Forest (47–16)	Wake Forest (47–16)	10.
11.	Cal State Fullerton	Georgia Tech (2–4)	Georgia Tech (4–4)	Georgia Tech (6–4)	Long Beach State (6–4)	Georgia Tech (13–4)	Texas A&M (16–5)	Florida (17–7)	Mississippi State (22–4)	Florida Atlantic (36–1)	Georgia Tech (27–9)	Florida Atlantic (41–2)	Florida Atlantic (44–2)	Florida Atlantic (46–4)	Florida Atlantic (49–3)	Pepperdine (42–12)	Wake Forest (44–13)	Southern California (36–24)	Ohio State (50–14)	Ohio State (50–14)	11.
12.	Auburn	Stanford (3–3)	Southern California (3–5)	Texas A&M (8–2)	Georgia Tech (8–4)	North Carolina (12–0)	Florida (12–7)	Alabama (19–5)	Wichita State (21–6)	Texas A&M (28–8)	Texas A&M (32–8)	Baylor (35–9)	Alabama (34–12)	Alabama (36–14)	Alabama (39–14)	Ohio State (46–10)	Pepperdine (43–14)	Clemson (41–25)	Southern California (36–26)	Southern California (36–26)	12.
13.	Texas Tech	Texas Tech (4–0)	Texas Tech (6–2)	Oklahoma State (6–1)	FIU (15–0)	Pepperdine (17–1)	FIU (22–2)	Mississippi State (19–3)	Baylor (24–6)	Texas (25–12)	Wichita State (31–8)	North Carolina (33–8)	Wake Forest (31–13)	Pepperdine (37–10)	Pepperdine (40–11)	Florida Atlantic (51–5)	Ohio State (46–12)	LSU (41–22–1)	Clemson (42–17)	Clemson (42–17)	13.
14.	Florida	Cal State Fullerton (1–2)	Cal State Fullerton (4–3)	Hawaii (13–2)	North Carolina (10–0)	Alabama (12–4)	Cal State Fullerton (17–5)	Texas Tech (23–5)	Florida Atlantic (31–1)	Wichita State (25–8)	Arkansas (26–12)	Auburn (33–9)	Auburn (35–10)	Wake Forest (32–13)	North Carolina (38–11)	Southern California (33–23)	Southern California (33–23)	Oklahoma State (44–18)	LSU (41–24–1)	LSU (41–24–1)	14.
15.	South Carolina	Texas A&M (3–0)	Arizona (13–1)	Arizona State (16–4)	Alabama (8–4)	Cal State Fullerton (14–5)	Alabama (15–5)	LSU (17–7)	Alabama (22–7)	North Carolina (25–7)	North Carolina (28–8)	Southern California (26–18)	Southern California (28–20)	Ohio State (38–7)	Wake Forest (33–13)	Wake Forest (39–13)	Florida Atlantic (52–7)	Auburn (46–17)	Auburn (46–19)	Auburn (46–19)	15.
16.	UCLA	South Carolina (2–0)	South Carolina (4–0)	Wichita State (6–4)	Cal State Fullerton (10–5)	Wichita State (11–5)	Mississippi State (16–2)	Texas A&M (20–6)	Texas (22–11)	Alabama (25–9)	Arizona State (32–12)	Wake Forest (28–11)	Mississippi State (33–11)	Southern California (30–22)	Southern California (31–22)	LSU (36–19–1)	Clemson (37–24)	Wichita State (59–14)	Wichita State (59–14)	Wichita State (59–14)	16.
17.	Texas A&M	Texas (5–0)	Texas A&M (4–2)	Texas Tech (9–4)	Wichita State (9–4)	Arizona State (19–8)	Wichita State (11–5)	Wichita State (17–6)	Texas A&M (25–7)	Arkansas (23–10)	Texas Tech (32–8)	Texas Tech (34–9)	Arkansas (29–17)	Texas Tech (38–11)	Texas Tech (39–11)	Oklahoma State (40–15)	LSU (37–21–1)	Arkansas (42–23)	Arkansas (42–23)	Arkansas (42–23)	17.
18.	Arkansas	UCLA (4–5)	Alabama (1–2)	Pepperdine (10–1)	Texas Tech (13–4)	Mississippi State (13–1)	Texas Tech (19–5)	Florida Atlantic (25–1)	Arizona State (27–11)	Arizona State (29–12)	Alabama (27–11)	Alabama (30–12)	Texas Tech (36–11)	Tulane (38–11)	LSU (34–17–1)	Texas Tech (40–13)	Nebraska (41–16)	East Carolina (46–16)	East Carolina (46–16)	East Carolina (46–16)	18.
19.	Oklahoma State	Arkansas (1–0)	Oklahoma State (3–0)	FIU (12–0)	Pepperdine (13–1)	NC State (14–1)	NC State (18–3)	Arizona State (24–10)	Nebraska (20–6)	Florida (21–12)	Nebraska (23–10)	Georgia Tech (28–12)	Ohio State (32–7)	LSU (32–17)	Clemson (32–19)	Clemson (34–22)	Tulane (45–15)	Pepperdine (46–16)	Pepperdine (46–16)	Pepperdine (46–16)	19.
20.	Clemson	Oklahoma State (1–0)	Clemson (3–0)	Clemson (3–0)	Mississippi State (9–1)	Long Beach State (8–6)	Arizona State (20–9)	Baylor (20–6)	Oral Roberts (22–4)	Texas Tech (28–8)	Texas (26–15)	Ole Miss (23–17)	Texas (32–17)	Ole Miss (30–20)	Oklahoma State (37–13)	North Carolina (40–14)	Oklahoma State (40–17)	Florida Atlantic (54–9)	Florida Atlantic (54–9)	Florida Atlantic (54–9)	20.
21.	Wake Forest	Arizona (9–0)	Washington (3–0)	North Carolina (6–0)	Baylor (12–3)	Texas Tech (16–5)	Baylor (16–5)	Long Beach State (14–8)	Texas Tech (24–8)	East Carolina (28–6)	Minnesota (24–7)	Nebraska (27–11)	Tulane (34–10)	Texas (34–19)	Houston (34–19)	Auburn (41–14)	North Carolina (40–16)	Tulane (48–17)	Tulane (48–17)	Tulane (48–17)	21.
22.	Baylor	Clemson (0–0)	Arizona State (13–4)	Alabama (4–3)	NC State (10–1)	Baylor (15–5)	Long Beach State (11–7)	Southern California (14–14)	LSU (20–9)	Southern California (20–16)	Southern California (22–17)	South Carolina (27–12)	LSU (29–17)	Auburn (36–13)	Auburn (38–140	South Alabama (36–16)	Texas Tech (40–15)	Texas Tech (42–17)	Texas Tech (42–17)	Texas Tech (42–17)	22.
23.	North Carolina	Hawaii (8–1)	Pepperdine (8–0)	South Carolina (5–2)	Oklahoma State (8–4)	South Carolina (12–3)	Florida Atlantic (20–1)	Oral Roberts (18–4)	Wake Forest (19–6)	VCU (25–6)	Ohio State (22–7)	Ohio State (27–7)	Clemson (27–17)	Clemson (29–18)	South Alabama (33–16)	Houston (35–21)	Auburn (43–16)	Southwestern Louisiana (41–22)	Southwestern Louisiana (42–24)	Southwestern Louisiana (42–24)	23.
24.	Washington	Washington (0–0)	FIU (9–0)	Washington (4–2)	South Carolina (8–3)	Florida Atlantic (15–1)	Louisville (15–3)	Winthrop (22–4)	East Carolina (24–5)	South Carolina (22–9)	East Carolina (30–7)	Texas (28–17)	Nebraska (30–13)	Nevada (32–14)	Notre Dame (39–11)	Nebraska (37–16)	Houston (38–22)	Houston (40–24)	Houston (40–24)	Houston (40–24)	24.
25.	Tulane	Baylor (1–2)	Hawaii (10–2)	NC State (7–1)	Houston (8–4)	Illinois (4–1)	South Carolina (15–5)	VCU (17–5)	Southern California (16–16)	Oklahoma State (23–8)	Tulane (27–8)	Tulane (30–9)	Oklahoma State (32–11)	Mississippi State (35–14)	Arizona State (38–19)	Arizona (33–21)	Arizona (33–21)	Minnesota (46–18)	Minnesota (46–18)	Minnesota (46–18)	25.
26.	Arizona	Arizona State (11–3)	Oral Roberts (4–1)	Mississippi State (5–1)	Hawaii (13–5)	Nevada (14–6)	Washington (11–4)	NC State (20–6)	South Carolina (21–7)	Oral Roberts (23–5)	SW Missouri State (25–7)	Arizona State (32–15)	Ole Miss (26–19)	Arizona State (36–18)	Oral Roberts (39–12)	Oral Roberts (42–13)	Oral Roberts (46–14)	Nevada (38–20)	Nevada (38–20)	Nevada (38–20)	26.
27.	Arizona State	Wake Forest (0–0)	Houston (3–2)	Baylor (8–4)	Clemson (5–3)	Washington (8–4)	Oklahoma State (12–6)	Oklahoma State (15–7)	VCU (20–6)	NC State (25–10)	South Carolina (24–11)	Loyola Marymount (24–16)	Notre Dame (32–10)	Oklahoma State (34–13)	Minnesota (39–12)	Georgia Tech (37–18)	South Alabama (38–18)	SW Missouri State (38–19)	SW Missouri State (38–9)	SW Missouri State (38–9)	27.
28.	Tennessee	North Carolina (0–0)	North Carolina (3–0)	Oral Roberts (6–2)	Georgia (9–1)	Hawaii (15–6)	Nevada (16–7)	Nevada (18–7)	NC State (23–7)	Nebraska (20–9)	Notre Dame (25–8)	Oklahoma State (29–10)	South Carolina (29–15)	Notre Dame (36–11)	Mississippi State (35–15)	Long Beach State (32–21)	East Carolina (44–14)	North Carolina (41–18)	North Carolina (41–18)	North Carolina (41–18)	28.
29.	Minnesota	Tulane (0–0)	UCLA (6–7)	Houston (5–4)	Arkansas (9–3)	Oklahoma State (11–6)	Tulane (15–5)	Washington State (15–5)	Oklahoma State (19–8)	Tulane (24–7)	Oklahoma State (25–10)	Arizona (29–16)	VCU (35–9)	East Carolina (38–11)	Ball State (35–15)	Ball State (40–16)	Long Beach State (33–23)	Long Beach State (35–25)	Long Beach State (35–25)	Long Beach State (35–25)	29.
30.	Illinois	Pepperdine (5–0)	Wake Forest (2–1)	Wake Forest (4–2)	UCLA (11–11)	Tulane (11–5)	Arizona (18–9)	Nebraska (16–6)	Minnesota (16–6)	TCU (20–13)	NC State (27–12)	Notre Dame (28–9)	Nevada (28–14)	South Alabama (30–16)	Coastal Carolina (37–12)	Coastal Carolina (40–13)	Georgia Tech (38–20)	Mississippi State (42–21)	Mississippi State (42–21)	Mississippi State (42–21)	30.
	Preseason Dec 17	Week 1 Feb 8	Week 2 Feb 15	Week 3 Feb 22	Week 4 Mar 1	Week 5 Mar 8	Week 6 Mar 15	Week 7 Mar 22	Week 8 Mar 29	Week 9 Apr 5	Week 10 Apr 12	Week 11 Apr 19	Week 12 Apr 26	Week 13 May 3	Week 14 May 10	Week 15 May 17	Week 16 May 24	Week 17 May 31	Week 18 June 7	Week 19 June 21	
		Dropped: 28 Tennessee; 29 Minnesota; 30 Illinois	Dropped: 19 Arkansas; 25 Baylor; 29 Tulane	Dropped: 12 Southern California; 15 Arizona; 29 UCLA	Dropped: 24 Washington; 28 Oral Roberts; 30 Wake Forest	Dropped: 25 Houston; 27 Clemson; 28 Georgia; 29 Arkansas; 30 UCLA	Dropped: 25 Illinois; 28 Hawaii	Dropped: 13 FIU; 24 Louisville; 25 South Carolina; 26 Washington; 29 Tulane; 30 Arizona	Dropped: 21 Long Beach State; 24 Winthrop; 28 Nevada; 29 Washington State	Dropped: 22 LSU; 23 Wake Forest; 30 Minnesota	Dropped: 19 Florida; 23 VCU; 26 Oral Roberts; 30 TCU	Dropped: 21 Minnesota; 24 East Carolina; 26 SW Missouri State; 30 NC State	Dropped: 19 Georgia Tech; 26 Arizona State; 27 Loyola Marymount; 29 Arizona	Dropped: 25 Oklahoma State; 28 South Carolina; 29 VCU	Dropped: 18 Tulane; 20 Ole Miss; 21 Texas; 24 Nevada; 29 East Carolina	Dropped: 24 Notre Dame; 25 Arizona State; 27 Minnesota; 28 Mississippi State	Dropped: 29 Ball State; 30 Coastal Carolina	Dropped: 18 Nebraska; 25 Arizona; 26 Oral Roberts; 27 South Alabama; 30 Georgia Tech	None	None	

The Preseason poll ranked the top 40 teams, while all remaining weeks ranked the top 30. Numbers 31–40 were: 31. Texas 32. Oklahoma 33. Houston 34. Loyola Marymount 35. Oral Roberts 36. FIU 37. Northeast Louisiana 38. Ohio State 39. Mississippi State 40. Notre Dame
