= 1999 Cal State Fullerton Titans baseball team =

American college baseball season

1999 Cal State Fullerton Titans baseball

NCAA Columbus Super Regional champions NCAA South Bend Regional champions Big West Conference champions

College World Series, 1–2
- Conference: Big West Conference
- Record: 50–14 (25–5 Big West)
- Head coach: George Horton (3rd year)
- Home stadium: Goodwin Field

1999 Big West Conference baseball standings
	Conf.				Overall
Team	W		L	PCT	W		L	PCT
No. 6 Cal State Fullerton ‍†‍‍^{y}	25	–	5	.833	50	–	14	.781
No. 26 Nevada ‍‍‍^{y}	21	–	9	.700	38	–	20	.655
No. 29 Long Beach State ‍‍‍^{y}	19	–	11	.633	35	–	25	.583
Pacific ‍‍‍	17	–	13	.567	32	–	24	.571
UC Santa Barbara ‍‍‍	14	–	16	.467	27	–	26	.509
Cal Poly ‍‍‍	9	–	21	.300	21	–	34	.382
Sacramento State ‍‍‍	8	–	22	.267	18	–	39	.316
New Mexico State ‍‍‍	7	–	23	.233	18	–	38	.321
† – Conference champion y – Invited to the NCAA tournament As of June 30, 1999; Rankings from Collegiate Baseball

The 1999 Cal State Fullerton Titans baseball team represented California State University, Fullerton in the 1999 NCAA Division I baseball season. The Titans played their home games at Goodwin Field, and played as part of the Big West Conference. The team was coached by George Horton in his third season as head coach at Cal State Fullerton.

The Titans reached the College World Series, their tenth appearance in Omaha, where they finished tied for fifth place after winning a game against Texas A&M and losing to Stanford and eventual runner-up Florida State.

== Personnel ==
=== Roster ===
1999 Cal State Fullerton Titans roster
Pitchers: 2 - Kirk Saarloos - Sophomore; 12 - Jordan De Jong - Sophomore; 19 - George Carralejo - Sophomore; 22 - Matt Sorensen - Sophomore; 23 - Adam Johnson - Sophomore; 27 - Jason Westemeir - RS Freshman; 31 - Marco Harlon - Senior; 32 - John Skinner - Junior; 34 - Jon Smith - Sophomore; 38 - Ruben Jurado - Senior; 42 - Mike Garner - Junior; 47 - Ryan Alvarez - Freshman; 48 - Sean Martin - Freshman; 49 - Barry Hawkins - Junior	Catchers: 15 - Craig Patterson - Junior; 24 - Brett Kay - Freshman; 36 - Chad Baum - Senior; 40 - Russell Vanderhook - Junior; 41 - Jeff Gates - Junior; 43 - Sean Bischofberger - Freshman; Outfielders: 5 - Reed Johnson - Junior; 6 - Chris Stringfellow - Freshman; 17 - Rudy Simpson - Freshman; 20 - Chris Beck - Junior; 21 - Spencer Oborn - Junior; 25 - Rod Perry - Sophomore; 26 - Robert Guzman - Freshman; 35 - Mike Tomarelli - Sophomore	Infielders: 1 - David Bacani - Sophomore; 3 - Shawn Norris - Freshman; 4 - Ryan Owens - Junior; 9 - Ryan Moore - Senior; 10 - Donnie Furnald - Freshman; 11 - Chad Olszanski - Sophomore; 45 - Aaron Rifkin - Sophomore

=== Coaches ===
1999 Cal State Fullerton Titans baseball coaching staff
- 8 - George Horton - Head coach - 3rd Season
- 18 - Dave Serrano - Assistant coach/Recruiting coordinator - 3rd Season
- 28 - Rick Vanderhook - Assistant coach - 13th Season
- 39 - Mike Kirby - Assistant coach - 4th Season

== Schedule and results ==
Legend
Cal State Fullerton win
Cal State Fullerton loss

1999 Cal State Fullerton Titans baseball game log
Regular season

February
Date	Opponent	Rank	Site/Stadium	Score	Overall Record	Big West Record
Feb 5	No. 8 Stanford*	No. 11	Goodwin Field • Fullerton, CA	W 8–0	1–0	
Feb 6	No. 8 Stanford*	No. 11	Goodwin Field • Fullerton, CA	L 5–6	1–1	
Feb 7	No. 8 Stanford*	No. 11	Goodwin Field • Fullerton, CA	L 7–13	1–2	
Feb 10	at No. 30 Pepperdine*	No. 14	Eddy D. Field Stadium • Malibu, CA	L 7–8	1–3	
Feb 12	Fresno State*	No. 14	Goodwin Field • Fullerton, CA	W 15–7	2–3	
Feb 13	Fresno State*	No. 14	Goodwin Field • Fullerton, CA	W 4–3	3–3	
Feb 14	Fresno State*	No. 14	Goodwin Field • Fullerton, CA	W 8–4	4–3	
Feb 17	at No. 12 USC*	No. 14	Dedeaux Field • Los Angeles, CA	W 6–5	5–3	
Feb 19	at UNLV*	No. 14	Earl Wilson Stadium • Paradise, NV	W 21–14	6–3	
Feb 20	at UNLV*	No. 14	Earl Wilson Stadium • Paradise, NV	W 16–6	7–3	
Feb 21	at UNLV*	No. 14	Earl Wilson Stadium • Paradise, NV	W 13–2	8–3	
Feb 24	USC*	No. 10	Goodwin Field • Fullerton, CA	W 7–5	9–3	
Feb 26	at No. 22 Alabama*	No. 10	Sewell–Thomas Stadium • Tuscaloosa, Alabama	W 5–2	10–3	
Feb 27	at No. 22 Alabama*	No. 10	Sewell–Thomas Stadium • Tuscaloosa, Alabama	L 4–5	10–4	
Feb 28	at No. 22 Alabama*	No. 10	Sewell–Thomas Stadium • Tuscaloosa, Alabama	L 6–7	10–5	

March
Date	Opponent	Rank	Site/Stadium	Score	Overall Record	Big West Record
Mar 2	at San Diego State*	No. 16	Tony Gwynn Stadium • San Diego, CA	W 15–7	11–5	
Mar 5	Houston*	No. 16	Goodwin Field • Fullerton, CA	W 3–2	12–5	
Mar 6	Houston*	No. 16	Goodwin Field • Fullerton, CA	W 8–7	13–5	
Mar 7	Houston*	No. 16	Goodwin Field • Fullerton, CA	W 9–3	14–5	
Mar 12	New Mexico State	No. 15	Goodwin Field • Fullerton, CA	W 12–4	15–5	1–0
Mar 13	New Mexico State	No. 15	Goodwin Field • Fullerton, CA	W 11–2	16–5	2–0
Mar 14	New Mexico State	No. 15	Goodwin Field • Fullerton, CA	W 10–3	17–5	3–0
Mar 16	No. 20 Arizona State*	No. 14	Goodwin Field • Fullerton, CA	W 7–	18–5	
Mar 19	at Sacramento State	No. 14	Hornet Field • Sacramento, CA	W 21–2	19–5	4–0
Mar 20	at Sacramento State	No. 14	Hornet Field • Sacramento, CA	W 11–5	20–5	5–0
Mar 21	at Sacramento State	No. 14	Hornet Field • Sacramento, CA	W 14–7	21–5	6–0
Mar 23	Loyola Marymount*	No. 8	Goodwin Field • Fullerton, CA	W 8–2	22–5	
Mar 26	No. 28 Nevada	No. 8	Goodwin Field • Fullerton, CA	W 11–5	23–5	7–0
Mar 27	No. 28 Nevada	No. 8	Goodwin Field • Fullerton, CA	W 5–4	24–5	8–0
Mar 28	No. 28 Nevada	No. 8	Goodwin Field • Fullerton, CA	W 11–5	25–5	9–0

April
Date	Opponent	Rank	Site/Stadium	Score	Overall Record	Big West Record
Apr 1	at Pacific	No. 5	Billy Hebert Field • Stockton, CA	W 13–7	26–5	10–0
Apr 2	at Pacific	No. 5	Billy Hebert Field • Stockton, CA	W 15–2	27–5	11–0
Apr 3	at Pacific	No. 5	Billy Hebert Field • Stockton, CA	L 3–4	27–6	11–1
Apr 7	San Diego*	No. 4	Goodwin Field • Fullerton, CA	W 15–2	28–6	
Apr 9	at Long Beach State	No. 4	Blair Field • Long Beach, CA	L 4–11	28–7	11–2
Apr 10	at Long Beach State	No. 4	Blair Field • Long Beach, CA	W 5–2	29–7	12–2
Apr 12	at Long Beach State	No. 4	Blair Field • Long Beach, CA	W 6–5	30–7	13–2
Apr 14	No. 3 Pepperdine*	No. 4	Goodwin Field • Fullerton, CA	L 3–5	30–8	
Apr 16	Cal Poly	No. 4	Goodwin Field • Fullerton, CA	W 9–1	31–8	14–2
Apr 17	Cal Poly	No. 4	Goodwin Field • Fullerton, CA	W 12–5	32–8	15–2
Apr 18	Cal Poly	No. 4	Goodwin Field • Fullerton, CA	W 11–8	33–8	16–2
Apr 21	at Loyola Marymount*	No. 3	George C. Page Stadium • Los Angeles, CA	W 5–3	34–8	
Apr 23	at UC Santa Barbara	No. 3	Caesar Uyesaka Stadium • Santa Barbara, CA	W 5–2	35–8	17–2
Apr 24	at UC Santa Barbara	No. 3	Caesar Uyesaka Stadium • Santa Barbara, CA	W 14–4	36–8	18–2
Apr 25	at UC Santa Barbara	No. 3	Caesar Uyesaka Stadium • Santa Barbara, CA	W 15–1	37–8	19–2
Apr 27	at UCLA*	No. 2	Jackie Robinson Stadium • Los Angeles, CA	W 11–10	38–8	
Apr 30	Sacramento State	No. 2	Goodwin Field • Fullerton, CA	W 4–0	39–8	20–2

May
Date	Opponent	Rank	Site/Stadium	Score	Overall Record	Big West Record
May 1	Sacramento State	No. 2	Goodwin Field • Fullerton, CA	W 14–7	40–8	21–2
May 2	Sacramento State	No. 2	Goodwin Field • Fullerton, CA	L 10–13	40–9	21–3
May 7	at New Mexico State	No. 2	Presley Askew Field • Las Cruces, NM	W 13–5	41–9	22–3
May 8	at New Mexico State	No. 2	Presley Askew Field • Las Cruces, NM	W 19–11	42–9	23–3
May 9	at New Mexico State	No. 2	Presley Askew Field • Las Cruces, NM	W 21–2	43–9	24–3
May 14	Long Beach State	No. 1	Goodwin Field • Fullerton, CA	L 0–4	43–10	24–4
May 15	Long Beach State	No. 1	Goodwin Field • Fullerton, CA	W 10–3	44–10	25–4
May 16	Long Beach State	No. 1	Goodwin Field • Fullerton, CA	L 3–15	44–11	25–5

Postseason

NCAA South Bend Regional
Date	Opponent	Rank/Seed	Site/Stadium	Score	Overall Record	Reg Record
May 28	(4) Michigan	No. 4 (1)	Frank Eck Stadium • Notre Dame, IN	W 6–5	45–11	1–0
May 29	(2) Notre Dame	No. 4 (1)	Frank Eck Stadium • Notre Dame, IN	W 6–3	46–11	2–0
May 30	(4) Michigan	No. 4 (1)	Frank Eck Stadium • Notre Dame, IN	W 9–4	47–11	3–0

NCAA Columbus Super Regional
Date	Opponent	Rank/Seed	Site/Stadium	Score	Overall Record	SR Record
June 4	No. 10 Ohio State	No. 4 (3)	Bill Davis Stadium • Columbus, OH	L 7–10	47–12	0–1
June 5	No. 10 Ohio State	No. 4 (3)	Bill Davis Stadium • Columbus, OH	W 11–5	48–12	1–1
June 6	No. 10 Ohio State	No. 4 (3)	Bill Davis Stadium • Columbus, OH	W 13–2	49–12	2–1

College World Series
Date	Opponent	Rank/Seed	Site/Stadium	Score	Overall Record	CWS Record
June 12	No. 1 (6) Stanford	No. 4 (3)	Johnny Rosenblatt Stadium • Omaha, NE	L 2–9	49–13	0–1
June 14	No. 9 (7) Texas A&M	No. 4 (3)	Johnny Rosenblatt Stadium • Omaha, NE	W 4–2	50–13	1–1
June 16	No. 1 (2) Florida State	No. 4 (3)	Johnny Rosenblatt Stadium • Omaha, NE	L 2–7	50–14	1–2

== Rankings ==
Ranking movements Legend: ██ Increase in ranking ██ Decrease in ranking
	Week																			
Poll	Pre	1	2	3	4	5	6	7	8	9	10	11	12	13	14	15	16	17	18	Final
Coaches'		*																		6
Baseball America																				6
Collegiate Baseball^	11	14	14	10	16	15	14	8	5	4	4	3	2	2	1	4	4	4	4	6
NCBWA†																				

^ Collegiate Baseball ranked 40 teams in their preseason poll, but only ranked 30 teams weekly during the season.
† NCBWA ranks 30 teams in their preseason poll, but only ranks 25 teams weekly during the season.
* A new poll was not released for this week, so for comparison purposes, the previous week's ranking is inserted in this week's slot.
