= 1999 Miami Hurricanes baseball team =

American college baseball season

1999 Miami Hurricanes baseball

National champions
- Conference: Independent

Ranking
- Coaches: No. 1
- CB: No. 1
- Record: 50–13
- Head coach: Jim Morris (6th year)
- Assistant coaches: Turtle Thomas (12th year); Lazaro Collazo (4th year); Gino DiMare (3rd year)
- Home stadium: Mark Light Field

1999 NCAA Division I baseball independents standings
| | Conf. | | | | Overall |
| Team | W | | L | PCT | W | | L | PCT |
|---|---|---|---|---|---|---|---|---|
| No. 1 Miami (FL) ‍‍‍^{y} | | – | | – | 50 | – | 13 | .794 |
| Grand Canyon ‍‍‍ | | – | | – | 36 | – | 17 | .679 |
| Texas–Pan American ‍‍‍ | | – | | – | 30 | – | 22 | .577 |
| Belmont ‍‍‍ | | – | | – | 28 | – | 24 | .538 |
| Cal State Northridge ‍‍‍ | | – | | – | 28 | – | 24 | .538 |
| C. W. Post ‍‍‍ | | – | | – | 15 | – | 28 | .349 |
| NYIT ‍‍‍ | | – | | – | 15 | – | 32 | .319 |
| Pace ‍‍‍ | | – | | – | 14 | – | 35 | .286 |
| Southern Utah ‍‍‍ | | – | | – | 14 | – | 35 | .286 |
| Hawaii–Hilo ‍‍‍ | | – | | – | 9 | – | 37 | .196 |
y – Invited to the NCAA tournament As of June 30, 1999; Rankings from Collegiate Baseball

The 1999 Miami Hurricanes baseball team represented the University of Miami in the 1999 NCAA Division I baseball season. The team was coached by Jim Morris in his 6th season.

The Hurricanes won the College World Series, defeating the Florida State Seminoles in the championship game.

== Roster ==
1999 Miami Hurricanes roster
| Pitchers: Ryan Channell; Luke DeBold; Tom Farmer; David Gil; Greg Howell; Matt Kamalsky; Michael Neu; Eduardo Perez Puig; Alex Prendes; Troy Roberson; Darryl Roque; Alex Santos; Chris Sheffield; Darin Spassof; Vince Vazquez; Brian Walker | Infielders: Kevin Brown; Kris Clute; Joe Curro; Raul De Castro; Matt Dryer; Lale Esquivel; Bobby Hill; Javy Rodriguez; Catchers: Mike DiRosa; Russ Jacobson; Greg Lovelady | Outfielders: Manny Crespo; Charlton Jimerson; Marcus Nettles; Mike Rodriguez; Brian Seever; Mark Walker |

== Schedule ==
1999 Miami Hurricanes baseball game log
Regular season (41–13)

January / February (12–3)
| Date | Rank | Opponent | Site/stadium | Score | Overall record |
|---|---|---|---|---|---|
| January 26 | No. 6 | Barry | Mark Light Field | W 8–3 | 1–0 |
| January 29 | No. 6 | Stetson | Mark Light Field | W 12–1 | 2–0 |
| January 30 | No. 6 | Stetson | Mark Light Field | W 4–3 | 3–0 |
| February 6 | No. 6 | at No. 14 Florida | McKethan Stadium | L 4–7 | 3–1 |
| February 7 | No. 6 | at No. 14 Florida | McKethan Stadium | L 12–14 | 3–2 |
| February 10 | No. 8 | at Florida International | University Park Stadium | L 3–4 | 3–3 |
| February 12 | No. 8 | No. 6 Florida | Mark Light Field | W 7–4 | 4–3 |
| February 13 | No. 8 | No. 6 Florida | Mark Light Field | W 10–3 | 5–3 |
| February 17 | No. 6 | Florida Atlantic | Mark Light Field | W 3–1 | 6–3 |
| February 19 | No. 6 | James Madison | Mark Light Field | W 13–1 | 7–3 |
| February 20 | No. 6 | James Madison | Mark Light Field | W 12–3 | 8–3 |
| February 21 | No. 6 | James Madison | Mark Light Field | W 14–2 | 9–3 |
| February 26 | No. 4 | No. 3 Texas | Mark Light Field | W 7–1 | 10–3 |
| February 27 | No. 4 | No. 3 Texas | Mark Light Field | W 6–4 | 11–3 |
| February 28 | No. 4 | No. 3 Texas | Mark Light Field | W 14–11 | 12–3 |

March (10–3)
| Date | Rank | Opponent | Site/stadium | Score | Overall record |
|---|---|---|---|---|---|
| March 5 | No. 3 | No. 28 Georgia | Mark Light Field | L 3–4 | 12–4 |
| March 6 | No. 3 | East Carolina | Mark Light Field | L 5–6 | 12–5 |
| March 6 | No. 3 | Ohio State | Mark Light Field | W 23–3 | 13–5 |
| March 7 | No. 3 | No. 28 Georgia | Mark Light Field | W 8–1 | 14–5 |
| March 12 | No. 8 | Princeton | Mark Light Field | W 16–1 | 15–5 |
| March 13 | No. 8 | Princeton | Mark Light Field | W 16–1 | 16–5 |
| March 14 | No. 8 | Princeton | Mark Light Field | W 15–6 | 17–5 |
| March 16 | No. 4 | at South Florida | Red McEwen Field | W 8–5 | 18–5 |
| March 17 | No. 4 | at South Florida | Red McEwen Field | W 9–4 | 19–5 |
| March 19 | No. 4 | vs. Marist | Homestead Sports Complex | W 15–1 | 20–5 |
| March 20 | No. 4 | vs. Iowa | Homestead Sports Complex | L 3–9 | 20–6 |
| March 26 | No. 6 | New York Tech | Mark Light Field | W 12–3 | 21–6 |
| March 27 | No. 6 | New York Tech | Mark Light Field | W 20–0 | 22–6 |

April (9–4)
| Date | Rank | Opponent | Site/stadium | Score | Overall record |
|---|---|---|---|---|---|
| April 2 | No. 6 | vs. Clemson | Knights Stadium | W 5–3 | 23–6 |
| April 3 | No. 6 | vs. Clemson | Knights Stadium | L 5–7 | 23–7 |
| April 4 | No. 6 | vs. Clemson | Knights Stadium | W 14–11 | 24–7 |
| April 9 | No. 5 | No. 27 North Carolina State | Mark Light Field | W 7–4 | 25–7 |
| April 10 | No. 5 | No. 27 North Carolina State | Mark Light Field | L 9–13 | 25–8 |
| April 11 | No. 5 | No. 27 North Carolina State | Mark Light Field | W 7–6 | 26–8 |
| April 16 | No. 5 | at No. 1 Florida State | Mike Martin Field at Dick Howser Stadium | L 2–8 | 26–9 |
| April 17 | No. 5 | at No. 1 Florida State | Mike Martin Field at Dick Howser Stadium | W 4–3 | 27–9 |
| April 18 | No. 5 | at No. 1 Florida State | Mike Martin Field at Dick Howser Stadium | W 8–7 | 28–9 |
| April 23 | No. 1 | No. 2 Florida State | Mark Light Field | W 8–7 | 29–9 |
| April 24 | No. 1 | No. 2 Florida State | Mark Light Field | W 9–4 | 30–9 |
| April 25 | No. 1 | No. 2 Florida State | Mark Light Field | W 9–8 | 31–9 |
| April 30 | No. 1 | Elon | Mark Light Field | L 6–13 | 31–10 |

May (10–3)
| Date | Rank | Opponent | Site/stadium | Score | Overall record |
|---|---|---|---|---|---|
| May 1 | No. 1 | Elon | Mark Light Field | W 11–0 | 32–10 |
| May 2 | No. 1 | Elon | Mark Light Field | W 24–5 | 33–10 |
| May 4 | No. 1 | Florida International | Mark Light Field | L 7–12 | 33–11 |
| May 7 | No. 1 | Jacksonville | Mark Light Field | W 2–0 | 34–11 |
| May 8 | No. 1 | Jacksonville | Mark Light Field | W 12–9 | 35–11 |
| May 11 | No. 2 | at No. 24 Notre Dame | Frank Eck Stadium | W 5–3 | 36–11 |
| May 12 | No. 2 | at No. 24 Notre Dame | Frank Eck Stadium | L 0–1 | 36–12 |
| May 14 | No. 2 | Winthrop | Mark Light Field | W 17–1 | 37–12 |
| May 15 | No. 2 | Winthrop | Mark Light Field | W 9–2 | 38–12 |
| May 16 | No. 2 | Winthrop | Mark Light Field | W 8–2 | 39–12 |
| May 20 | No. 1 | at No. 28 Long Beach State | Blair Field | L 0–12 | 39–13 |
| May 21 | No. 1 | at No. 28 Long Beach State | Blair Field | W 9–7 | 40–13 |
| May 22 | No. 1 | at No. 28 Long Beach State | Blair Field | W 8–6 | 41–13 |

Postseason (9–0)

NCAA tournament: Coral Gables Regional (3–0)
| Date | Rank | Opponent | Site/stadium | Score | Overall record |
|---|---|---|---|---|---|
| May 28 | No. 1 (1) | vs. (4) Bethune-Cookman | Mark Light Field | W 15–9 | 42–13 |
| May 29 | No. 1 (1) | vs. (3) Florida International | Mark Light Field | W 6–4 | 43–13 |
| May 30 | No. 1 (1) | vs. (2) No. 15 Florida Atlantic | Mark Light Field | W 3–2 | 44–13 |

NCAA tournament: Coral Gables Super Regional (2–0)
| Date | Rank | Opponent | Site/stadium | Score | Overall record |
|---|---|---|---|---|---|
| June 4 | No. 1 (1) | vs. No. 9 Wake Forest | Mark Light Field | W 10–2 | 45–13 |
| June 4 | No. 1 (1) | vs. No. 9 Wake Forest | Mark Light Field | W 8–1 | 46–13 |

NCAA tournament: College World Series (4–0)
| Date | Rank | Opponent | Site/stadium | Score | Overall record |
|---|---|---|---|---|---|
| June 11 | No. 1 (1) | vs. (8) No. 2 Rice | Rosenblatt Stadium | W 8-4 | 47–13 |
| June 13 | No. 1 (1) | vs. (5) No. 7 Alabama | Rosenblatt Stadium | W 8–1 | 48–13 |
| June 17 | No. 1 (1) | vs. (5) No. 7 Alabama | Rosenblatt Stadium | W 5–2 | 49–13 |
| June 19 | No. 1 (1) | vs. (2) No. 3 Florida State | Rosenblatt Stadium | W 6–5 | 50–13 |

== Awards and honors ==
Manny Crespo

- College World Series All-Tournament Team

Lale Esquivel

- College World Series All-Tournament Team

Bobby Hill

- College World Series All-Tournament Team

Michael Neu

- College World Series All-Tournament Team

Mike Rodriguez

- Freshman All-America

== Hurricanes in the 1999 MLB draft ==
The following members of the Miami baseball program were drafted in the 1999 Major League Baseball draft.

| Player | Position | Round | Overall | MLB team |
|---|---|---|---|---|
| Bobby Hill | SS | 2nd | 66th | Chicago White Sox |
| Russ Jacobson | C | 3rd | 96th | Philadelphia Phillies |
| Alex Santos | RHP | 4th | 115th | Tampa Bay Devil Rays |
| David Gil | RHP | 7th | 216th | Philadelphia Phillies |
| Michael Neu | RHP | 29th | 878th | Cincinnati Reds |
