= Marshall McDougall =

American baseball player (born 1978)

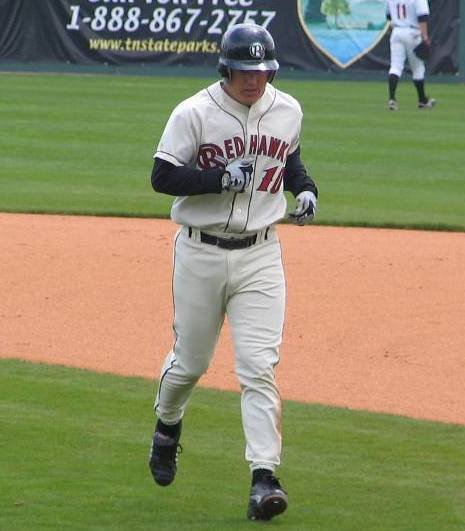
- Third baseman
- Born: December 19, 1978 (age 47); Jacksonville, Florida, U.S.
- Batted: Right Threw: Right

Professional debut
- MLB: June 7, 2005, for the Texas Rangers
- CPBL: March 20, 2010, for the Uni-President 7-Eleven Lions

Last appearance
- MLB: October 2, 2005, for the Texas Rangers
- CPBL: 2010, for the Uni-President 7-Eleven Lions

MLB statistics
- Batting average: .167
- Home runs: 0
- Runs batted in: 0

CPBL statistics
- Batting average: .297
- Home runs: 8
- Runs batted in: 35
- Stats at Baseball Reference

Teams
- Texas Rangers (2005); Uni-President 7-Eleven Lions (2010)

Marshall James McDougall (born December 19, 1978) is an American former professional baseball player. Primarily a third baseman, he has played part of one season in Major League Baseball with the Texas Rangers, and one season in the Chinese Professional Baseball League with the Uni-President 7-Eleven Lions.

== College career ==
McDougall, who bats and throws right-handed, attended Florida State University, and played college baseball for the Florida State Seminoles (1999–2000), where he played under head coach Mike Martin and was a first team consensus All-American in 1999. In that same year, he was a finalist for the Golden Spikes Award and the Dick Howser Trophy. He was named the Most Outstanding Player at the 1999 College World Series.

On May 9, 1999, against the Maryland Terrapins, his 7-for-7 performance at the plate with 6 home runs, 16 runs batted in (RBIs), and 25 total bases shattered NCAA single game records in all three categories.

After the 1999 season, he played collegiate summer baseball with the Harwich Mariners of the Cape Cod Baseball League.

== Professional career ==
McDougall was drafted by the Oakland Athletics in the 9th round of the 2000 MLB draft and played in the Athletics organization until July 30, 2002, when he was traded to the Cleveland Indians for Ricardo Rincón. After playing the rest of the season with Single-A Mahoning Valley and Double-A Akron, McDougall was selected in the 2002 Rule 5 draft by the Texas Rangers. He played in Texas' organization, making his MLB debut on June 7, 2005, until released on June 29, 2006. He played in the Los Angeles Dodgers organization in 2007 and the San Diego Padres organization in 2008.

In 2009, McDougall played for the Broncos de Reynosa, and in 2010 he signed with the CPBL's Lions. He returned to the Broncos for the 2011 season. He has also played for the Algodoneros de Guasave in the Mexican Pacific League.

== See also ==
- Rule 5 draft results
