= 1999 NCAA Division I baseball tournament =

- Season: 1999
- Teams: 64
- Finals site: Johnny Rosenblatt Stadium; Omaha, NE
- Champions: Miami (FL) (3rd title)
- Runner-up: Florida State (17th CWS Appearance)
- Winning coach: Jim Morris (1st title)
- MOP: Marshall McDougall (Florida State)

The 1999 NCAA Division I baseball tournament was played at the end of the 1999 NCAA Division I baseball season to determine the national champion of college baseball. The tournament was expanded to 64 teams for 1999, adding a Super Regional. The tournament concluded with eight teams competing in the College World Series, a double-elimination tournament in its fifty third year. Sixteen regional competitions were held to determine the participants in the final event, with each winner advancing to a best of three series against another regional champion for the right to play in the College World Series. Each region was composed of four teams, resulting in 64 teams participating in the tournament at the conclusion of their regular season, and in some cases, after a conference tournament. The fifty-third tournament's champion was Miami (FL), coached by Jim Morris. The Most Outstanding Player was Marshall McDougall of Florida State University.

== National seeds ==
Bold indicates CWS participant.

1. **Miami (FL)**
2. **Florida State**
3. **Cal State Fullerton**
4. Baylor
5. **Alabama**
6. **Stanford**
7. **Texas A&M**
8. **Rice**

== Regionals and super regionals ==
Bold indicates winner.

=== Coral Gables Super Regional ===
First round	Second round
**1**	**Miami (FL)**	**15**
4	Bethune-Cookman	9
**1**	**Miami (FL)**	**6**
3	FIU	4
3	**FIU**	**4**
2	Florida Atlantic	1
Coral Gables Regional
4	Bethune-Cookman	0
2	**Florida Atlantic**	**12**
2	**Florida Atlantic**	**1**
3	FIU	0
1	**Wake Forest**	**22**
4	Siena	4
1	**Wake Forest**	**12**
2	Richmond	1
3	Virginia Tech	3
2	**Richmond**	**5**
Winston-Salem Regional
4	Siena	5
3	**Virginia Tech**	**11**
3	Virginia Tech	**8**
2	**Richmond**	11

Regional finals
**1**	**Miami (FL)**	**3**	–
2	Florida Atlantic	2	–
1	**Wake Forest**	3	**13**
2	Richmond	**9**	3

Super regionals
1	**Miami (FL)**	**10**	**8**	–
Wake Forest	2	1	–

=== Tallahassee Super Regional ===
First round	Second round
**1**	**Florida State**	**24**
4	The Citadel	6
**1**	**Florida State**	**9**
3	Jacksonville	2
3	**Jacksonville**	**7**
2	Providence	5
Tallahassee Regional
4	The Citadel	1
2	**Providence**	**12**
2	**Providence**	**9**
3	Jacksonville	8
1	Tulane	7
4	**Winthrop**	**8**^{11}
4	Winthrop	6
2	**Auburn**	**8**
3	NC State	7
2	**Auburn**	**9**
Auburn Regional
1	**Tulane**	**11**
3	NC State	5
1	**Tulane**	**15**
4	Winthrop	8

Regional finals
**1**	**Florida State**	**14**	–
2	Providence	3	–
2	**Auburn**	5	**13**
1	Tulane	**7**	9

Super regionals
2	**Florida State**	**10**	**6**	–
Auburn	2	3	–

=== Columbus Super Regional ===
First round	Second round
**1**	**Cal State Fullerton**	**6**
4	Michigan	5
**1**	**Cal State Fullerton**	**6**
2	Notre Dame	3
3	Creighton	1
2	**Notre Dame**	**8**
South Bend Regional
4	**Michigan**	**13**
3	Creighton	5
4	**Michigan**	**11**
2	Notre Dame	5
1	**Ohio State**	**4**
4	Bowling Green	1
1	**Ohio State**	**6**
3	Mississippi State	3
3	**Mississippi State**	**18**
2	Nebraska	14
Columbus Regional
4	Bowling Green	5
2	**Nebraska**	**10**
2	Nebraska	7
3	**Mississippi State**	**13**

Regional finals
**1**	**Cal State Fullerton**	**9**	–
4	Michigan	4	–
1	**Ohio State**	**10**	–
3	Mississippi State	7	–

Super regionals
3	**Cal State Fullerton**	7	**11**	**13**
Ohio State	**10**	5	2

=== Waco Super Regional ===
First round	Second round
**1**	**Baylor**	**7**
4	Eastern Illinois	3
**1**	**Baylor**	**6**
2	Minnesota	4
3	Arizona	3
2	**Minnesota**	**4**
Waco Regional – Baylor Ballpark
4	**Eastern Illinois**	**13**
3	Arizona	4
4	Eastern Illinois	10
2	**Minnesota**	**15**
1	**Wichita State**	**13**
4	Oral Roberts	5
1	**Wichita State**	**4**
3	UCLA	2
3	**UCLA**	**12**
2	Oklahoma State	6
Wichita Regional – Eck Stadium
4	Oral Roberts	4
2	**Oklahoma State**	**12**
2	**Oklahoma State**	**17**
3	UCLA	10

Regional finals
**1**	**Baylor**	**22**	–
2	Minnesota	6	–
1	Wichita State	8	6
2	**Oklahoma State**	**11**	**7**

Super regionals
4	Baylor	11	**17**	2
**Oklahoma State**	**18**	7	**6**

=== Tuscaloosa Super Regional ===
First round	Second round
**1**	**Alabama**	**16**
4	Navy	3
**1**	**Alabama**	**10**
3	Southern Miss	4
3	**Southern Miss**	**20**
2	South Alabama	13
Tuscaloosa Regional--Sewell-Thomas Stadium
4	Navy	0
2	**South Alabama**	**10**
2	South Alabama	9
3	**Southern Miss**	**10**
1	**East Carolina**	**13**
4	Southern	2
1	**East Carolina**	**11**
2	LSU	10
3	Northeast Louisiana	4
2	**LSU**	**11**
Baton Rouge Regional--Alex Box Stadium
4	**Southern**	**8**^{10}
3	Northeast Louisiana	7
4	Southern	3
2	**LSU**	**6**

Regional finals
**1**	**Alabama**	**7**	–
3	Southern Miss	6	–
1	East Carolina	10	0
2	**LSU**	**12**	**9**

Super regionals
5	**Alabama**	**13**	**13**	–
LSU	6	5	–

=== Stanford Super Regional ===
First round	Second round
**1**	**Stanford**	**10**
4	Loyola Marymount	2
**1**	**Stanford**	**7**
3	North Carolina	4
3	**North Carolina**	**8**^{12}
2	Nevada	5
Stanford Regional
4	Loyola Marymount	3
2	**Nevada**	**4**
2	**Nevada**	**5**
3	North Carolina	1
1	**Pepperdine**	**4**
4	Harvard	0
1	Pepperdine	3
2	**Southern California**	**5**
3	VCU	0
2	**Southern California**	**10**
Los Angeles Regional
4	Harvard	2
3	**VCU**	**3**
3	VCU	5
1	**Pepperdine**	**12**

Regional finals
**1**	**Stanford**	**7**	–
2	Nevada	4	–
2	**Southern California**	3	**12**
1	Pepperdine	**4**	7

Super regionals
6	**Stanford**	**1**	**5**	–
Southern California	0	3	–

=== College Station Super Regional ===
First round	Second round
**1**	**Texas A&M**	**6**
4	Monmouth	0
1	Texas A&M	5
2	**Long Beach State**	**7**
3	Ole Miss	3
2	**Long Beach State**	**4**^{10}
College Station Regional – Olsen Field
4	Monmouth	3
3	**Ole Miss**	**12**
3	Ole Miss	6
**1**	**Texas A&M**	**13**
1	**Arkansas**	**10**
4	Delaware	6
1	Arkansas	8
3	**SW Missouri State**	**9**^{10}
3	**SW Missouri State**	**23**
2	Clemson	5
Fayetteville Regional – Baum Stadium
4	Delaware	3
2	**Clemson**	**17**
2	**Clemson**	**12**
1	Arkansas	4

Regional finals
2	Long Beach State	5	7
**1**	**Texas A&M**	**9**	**17**
3	SW Missouri State	7	5
2	**Clemson**	**8**	**7**

Super regionals
7	**Texas A&M**	**20**	3	**5**
Clemson	3	**10**	4

=== Houston Super Regional ===
Hosted by Rice at the Astrodome

First round	Second round
**1**	Rice	4
4	**Milwaukee**	**8**
4	Milwaukee	5
2	**Texas Tech**	**8**
3	Rutgers	2
2	**Texas Tech**	**5**
Lubbock Regional – Dan Law Field
**1**	**Rice**	**6**
3	Rutgers	1
**1**	**Rice**	**27**
4	Milwaukee	1
1	**Houston**	**6**
4	SW Texas State	4
1	Houston	3
2	**Louisiana–Lafayette**	**5**
3	Texas	6
2	**Louisiana–Lafayette**	**13**
Houston Regional – Cougar Field
4	SW Texas State	5
3	**Texas**	**7**
3	Texas	5
1	**Houston**	**8**

Regional finals
2	Texas Tech	1	11
**1**	**Rice**	**3**	**15**
2	**Louisiana–Lafayette**	**19**	–
1	Houston	8	–

Super regionals
8	**Rice**	8	**10**	**8**
Louisiana–Lafayette	**12**	1	3

== College World Series ==
=== Participants ===
School	Conference	Record (conference)	Head coach	CWS appearances	CWS best finish	CWS W-L Record
Alabama	SEC	51–14 (21–9)	Jim Wells	4 (last: 1997)	2nd (1983, 1997)	9–8
Cal State Fullerton	Big West	49–12 (25–5)	George Horton	9 (last: 1995)	1st (1979, 1984, 1995)	22–14
Florida State	ACC	53–12 (22–2)	Mike Martin	16 (last: 1998)	2nd (1970, 1986)	19–32
Miami (FL)	n/a	46–13 (n/a)	Jim Morris	17 (last: 1998)	1st (1982, 1985)	35–30
Oklahoma State	Big 12	46–19 (18–9)	Tom Holliday	18 (last: 1996)	1st (1959)	38–34
Rice	WAC	58–13 (25–5)	Wayne Graham	1 (last: 1997)	7th (1997)	0–2
Stanford	Pac-10	48–13 (19–5)	Mark Marquess	10 (last: 1997)	1st (1987, 1988)	23–18
Texas A&M	Big 12	52–16 (23–6)	Mark Johnson	3 (last: 1993)	5th (1993)	2–6

=== Results ===
==== Bracket ====
First round
5	**Alabama**	**11**
Oklahoma State	3
8	Rice	4
1	**Miami (FL)**	**8**
Oklahoma State	2
8	**Rice**	**7**
6	**Stanford**	**9**
3	Cal State Fullerton	2
7	Texas A&M	3
2	**Florida State**	**7**
3	**Cal State Fullerton**	**4**
7	Texas A&M	2

Second round
5	Alabama	1
1	**Miami (FL)**	**8**
8	Rice	5
5	**Alabama**	**6**
6	**Stanford**	**10**
2	Florida State	6
3	Cal State-Fullerton	2
2	**Florida State**	**7**

Semifinals
1	**Miami (FL)**	**5**	—
5	Alabama	2	—
6	Stanford	6	11
2	**Florida State**	**8**	**14**^{13}

Finals
1	**Miami (FL)**	**6**
2	Florida State	5

==== Game results ====
Date	Game	Winner	Score	Loser	Notes
June 11	Game 1	Alabama	11–3	Oklahoma State	
June 11	Game 2	Miami (FL)	8–4	Rice	
June 12	Game 3	Florida State	7–3	Texas A&M	
June 12	Game 4	Stanford	9–2	Cal State Fullerton	
June 13	Game 5	Miami (FL)	8–1	Alabama	
June 13	Game 6	Rice	7–2	Oklahoma State	Oklahoma State eliminated
June 14	Game 7	Stanford	10–6	Florida State	
June 14	Game 8	Cal State Fullerton	4–2	Texas A&M	Texas A&M eliminated
June 16	Game 9	Alabama	6–5	Rice	Rice eliminated
June 16	Game 10	Florida State	7–2	Cal State Fullerton	Cal State Fullerton eliminated
June 17	Game 11	Miami (FL)	5–2	Alabama	Alabama eliminated
June 17	Game 12	Florida State	8–6	Stanford	
June 18	Game 13	Florida State	14–11 (13)	Stanford	Stanford eliminated
June 19	Final	Miami (FL)	6–5	Florida State	Miami (FL) wins CWS

=== All-Tournament Team ===
The following players were members of the College World Series All-Tournament Team.

Position	Player	School
P	Chris Chavez	Florida State
P	Michael Neu	Miami (FL)
C	Jeremiah Klosterman	Florida State
1B	John Gall	Stanford
2B	**Marshall McDougall (MOP)**	Florida State
3B	Lale Esquivel	Miami (FL)
SS	Bobby Hill	Miami (FL)
OF	Manny Crespo	Miami (FL)
OF	Matt Diaz	Florida State
OF	G.W. Keller	Alabama
DH	Sam Scott	Florida State

=== Notable players ===
- Alabama: Andy Phillips
- Cal State Fullerton: Adam Johnson, Kirk Saarloos
- Florida State: Kevin Cash, Matt Diaz
- Miami (FL): Bobby Hill, Mike Neu
- Oklahoma State:
- Rice:
- Stanford: Joe Borchard, Tony Cogan, Justin Wayne
- Texas A&M: Casey Fossum

== See also ==
- 1999 NCAA Division II baseball tournament
- 1999 NCAA Division III baseball tournament
- 1999 NAIA World Series
