= Matt Diaz =

American baseball player (born 1978)

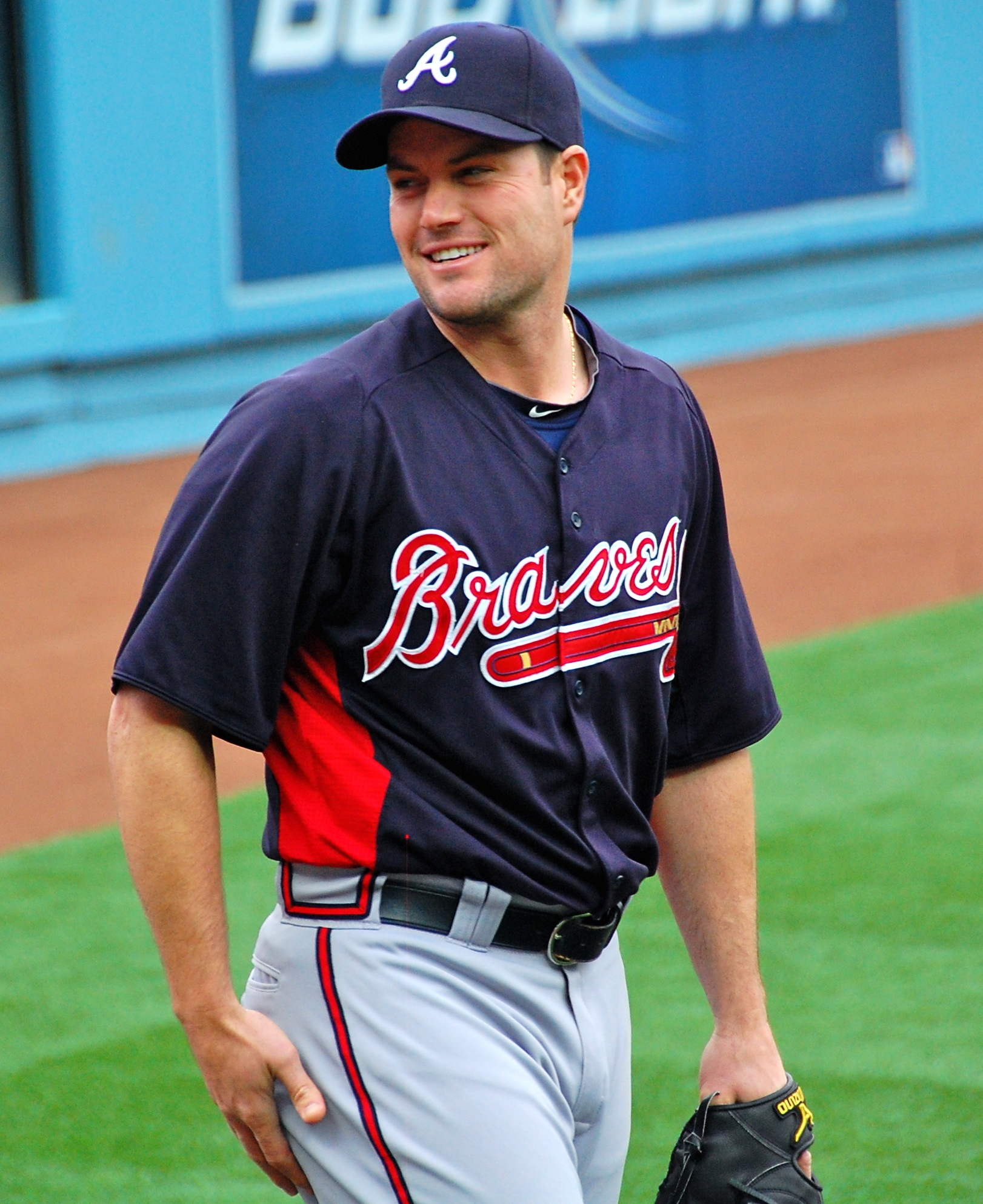
- Diaz with the Atlanta Braves
- Outfielder
- Born: March 3, 1978 (age 48); Portland, Oregon, U.S.
- Batted: Right Threw: Right

MLB debut
- July 19, 2003, for the Tampa Bay Devil Rays

Last MLB appearance
- May 18, 2013, for the Miami Marlins

MLB statistics
- Batting average: .290
- Home runs: 45
- Runs batted in: 226
- Stats at Baseball Reference

Teams
- Tampa Bay Devil Rays (2003–2004); Kansas City Royals (2005); Atlanta Braves (2006–2010); Pittsburgh Pirates (2011); Atlanta Braves (2011–2012); Miami Marlins (2013)

Matthew Edward Diaz (/ˈdaɪ.æz/ DY-az; born March 3, 1978) is an American former professional baseball outfielder. He played in Major League Baseball (MLB) for the Tampa Bay Devil Rays, Kansas City Royals, Atlanta Braves, Pittsburgh Pirates, and Miami Marlins.

== Amateur career ==
As a two-year starter at Florida State University, Diaz helped lead the Seminoles to two College World Series appearances, including the 1999 title game vs. the University of Miami. He was named the Sporting News man of the Year in 1998, and a First Team All-American (American Baseball Coaches Association, National Baseball College Writers' Association) in 1999.

== Professional career ==
=== Tampa Bay Devil Rays ===
Diaz was drafted by the Tampa Bay Devil Rays in the 1999 Major League Baseball draft in the 17th round (505th overall).

Diaz made four appearances for the Devil Rays during his rookie campaign in 2003, going 1-for-9 (.111) with one walk. He made 10 appearances for Tampa Bay during the 2004 season, going 4-for-21 (.190) with one home run, three RBI, and one walk. Despite being among the Devil Rays' minor league career leaders in hits and extra base hits, Diaz had a tough time in the majors, hitting only .167 in 30 at-bats in his two years with the Devil Rays.

=== Kansas City Royals ===
After being released by Tampa Bay, Diaz signed with the Kansas City Royals, where he hit .281/.323/.404 with 10 extra base hits (including one home run) and 12 RBI across 34 games in a backup role in 2005.

=== Atlanta Braves ===
On December 19, 2005, Diaz was traded to the Atlanta Braves for minor league pitcher Ricardo Rodríguez. Diaz earned a backup outfielder spot for the Braves during spring training. On August 14, 2006, Diaz had four hits for the second straight day and tied the National League record with ten straight hits. He grounded out in the 9th inning to end the streak. Diaz made 124 appearances for Atlanta during his inaugural campaign with the team, slashing .327/.364/.475 with seven home runs, 32 RBI, and five stolen bases.

Diaz had his first career two-homer game on August 29, 2007, against the Florida Marlins. On September 5, he hit a three-run walk-off double in the bottom of the ninth to give the Braves a 9-8 win. Diaz made 135 appearances for the Braves during the regular season, hitting .338/.368/.497 with 12 home runs, 45 RBI, and four stolen bases.

Diaz played in 43 games for Atlanta in 2008, hitting .244/.264/.304 with two home runs, 14 RBI, and four stolen bases. Appearing in 125 games for the team in 2009, Diaz set new career-highs in home runs (13), RBI (58), and stolen bases (12), while posting a .313/.390/.488 batting line.

In a game against the Philadelphia Phillies, with Jayson Werth batting, a field invader was captured by stadium security after a body block from Diaz enabled security to catch the invader. He made 84 appearances for the team during the season, slashing .250/.302/.438 with seven home runs, 31 RBI, and three stolen bases.

=== Pittsburgh Pirates ===
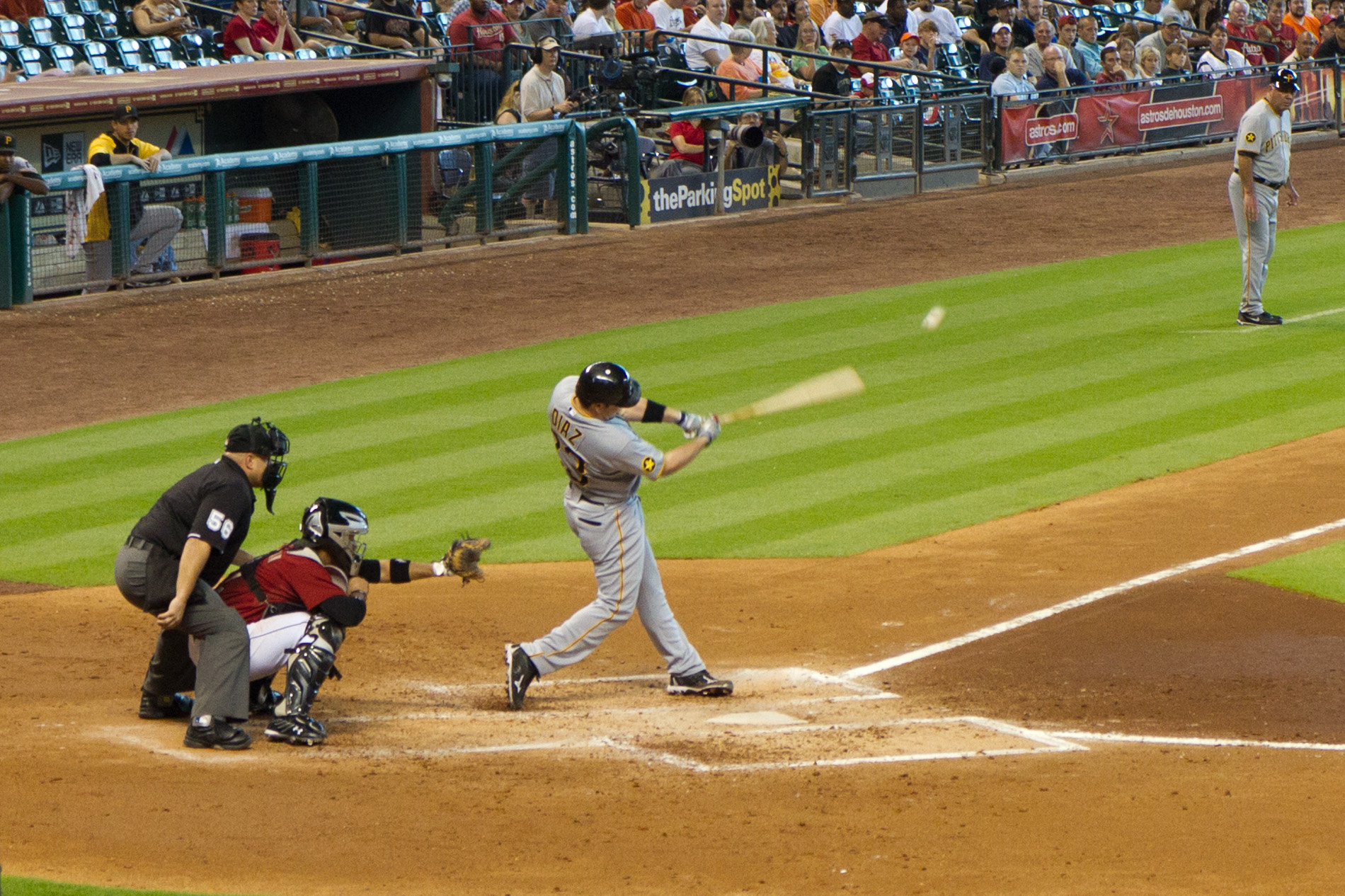
Matt Diaz hitting against the Houston Astros

On December 8, 2010, Diaz agreed to a two-year, $4.25 million contract with the Pittsburgh Pirates. Diaz made 100 appearances for the Pirates during the 2011 season, batting .259/.303/.324 with 19 RBI and four stolen bases.

=== Atlanta Braves (second stint) ===
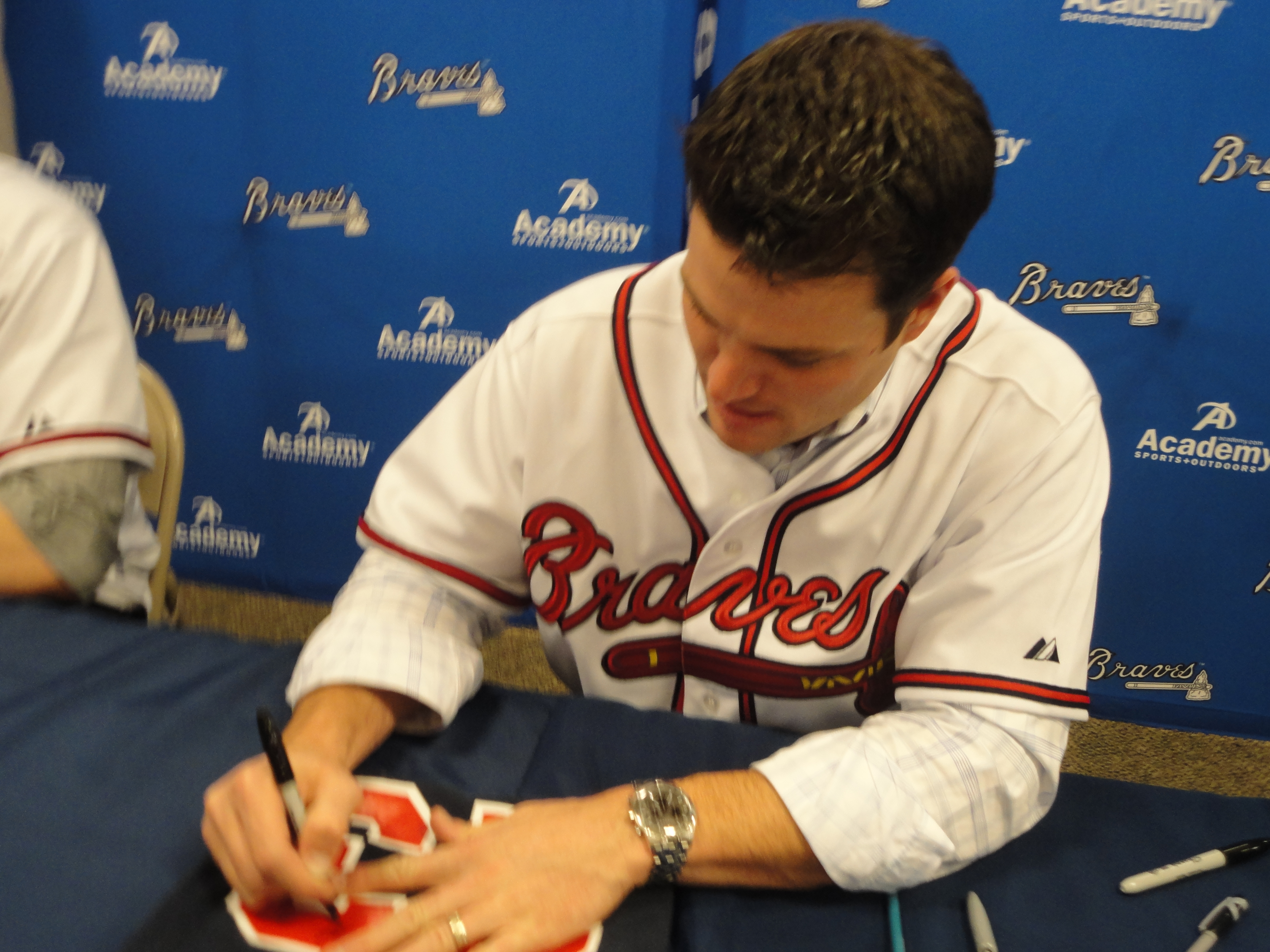
Diaz signing autographs in 2012

On August 31, 2011, Diaz (along with cash) was traded back to the Atlanta Braves in exchange for a player to be named later. On September 20, Eliecer Cardenas was traded to Pittsburgh to complete the trade. In 16 games for Atlanta, Diaz went 10-for-35 (.286) with one RBI and one stolen base.

On August 13, 2012, the Braves announced that Diaz would have surgery on his thumb and would miss the remainder of the season. In 51 games for the team, he hit .222/.280/.333 with two home runs and 13 RBI.

=== Miami Marlins ===
On December 26, 2012, Diaz signed a minor league contract with the New York Yankees that included an invitation to spring training. He was released prior to the start of the regular season on March 17, 2013.

On March 25, 2013, Diaz signed a minor league contract with the Miami Marlins organization. Diaz was promoted to the major leagues from their Triple-A affiliate, the New Orleans Zephyrs, on May 2. In 10 appearances for Miami, he went 3-for-18 (.167) with one RBI and one walk.

On February 4, 2014, Diaz announced his retirement from professional baseball.

== Post-playing career ==
On April 24, 2014, Diaz joined the Braves' pre-game and postgame telecast of Braves Live on Fox Sports South, which he will do regularly for the 2014 season. Diaz also does work for MLB Network Radio.

== Personal life ==
A born-again Christian, Diaz and his wife Leslee have three kids, Nathan Everett, Anna Grace, and Matthew Jacob. Matt is the second oldest of four brothers: Zachary, contemporary Christian singer Jonny Diaz, and Benjamin. His surname has an Anglicized pronunciation which originated with his grandfather who had emigrated from Barcelona. He grew up in Lakeland, Florida.
