= 1999 NCAA Division I baseball season =

Baseball season

- Number of teams: 274

NCAA tournament

College World Series
- Champions: Miami (FL) (3rd title)
- Runners-up: Florida State (17th CWS Appearance)
- Winning coach: Jim Morris (1st title)
- MOP: Marshall McDougall (Florida State)

Seasons
- ← 1998 2000 →

The 1999 NCAA Division I baseball season, play of college baseball in the United States organized by the National Collegiate Athletic Association (NCAA) began in the spring of 1999. The season progressed through the regular season and concluded with the 1999 College World Series. The College World Series, held for the fifty third time in 1999, consisted of one team from each of eight super regional competitions and was held in Omaha, Nebraska, at Johnny Rosenblatt Stadium as a double-elimination tournament. Miami (FL) claimed the championship for the third time.

== Realignment ==
- Lamar left the Sun Belt Conference and joined the Southland Conference.
- The Northeast Conference added Central Connecticut (formerly of the Mid-Continent Conference), Quinnipiac (formerly NCAA Division II), and UMBC (formerly of the Big South Conference) and created North and South Divisions of five and four teams, respectively.

=== Format changes ===
- The Big West Conference, Mid-Continent Conference, and Pacific-10 Conference dissolved their two division formats.
- The Trans America Athletic Conference dissolved its unique three division format.
- The West Coast Conference divided into two divisions of four teams each, named West and Coast.

== Conference winners ==
This is a partial list of conference champions from the 1999 season. The NCAA sponsored regional and super regional competitions to determine the College World Series participants. Each of the sixteen regionals consisted of four teams competing in double-elimination tournaments, with the winners advancing to eight best of three Super Regionals. The winners of each Super Regional advanced to Omaha. 29 teams earned automatic bids by winning their conference championship while 35 teams earned at-large selections.

Conference	Regular season winner	Conference Tournament	Tournament Venue • City	Tournament Winner
America East Conference	Towson	1999 America East Conference baseball tournament	Frawley Stadium • Wilmington, DE	Delaware
Atlantic Coast Conference	Florida State	1999 Atlantic Coast Conference baseball tournament	Durham Bulls Athletic Park • Durham, NC	Wake Forest
Big 12 Conference	Texas A&M	1999 Big 12 Conference baseball tournament	AT&T Bricktown Ballpark • Oklahoma City, OK	Nebraska
Big East Conference	Notre Dame	1999 Big East Conference baseball tournament	Mercer County Waterfront Park • Trenton, NJ	Providence
Big South Conference	Coastal Carolina	1999 Big South Conference baseball tournament	Charles Watson Stadium • Conway, SC	Winthrop
Big Ten Conference	Ohio State	1999 Big Ten Conference baseball tournament	Bill Davis Stadium • Columbus, OH	Michigan
Big West Conference	Cal State Fullerton	No tournament		
Colonial Athletic Association	Richmond	1999 Colonial Athletic Association baseball tournament	Grainger Stadium • Kinston, NC	East Carolina
Conference USA	Houston	1999 Conference USA baseball tournament	USA Stadium • Millington, TN	Tulane
Ivy League	Gehrig - Princeton; Rolfe - Harvard	1999 Ivy League Baseball Championship Series	Joseph J. O'Donnell Field • Cambridge, MA	Harvard
Metro Atlantic Athletic Conference	Northern - Siena; Southern - Iona	1999 Metro Atlantic Athletic Conference baseball tournament	Dutchess Stadium • Wappingers Falls, NY	Siena
Mid-American Conference	East - Bowling Green; West - Ball State	1999 Mid-American Conference baseball tournament	Warren E. Steller Field • Bowling Green, OH	Bowling Green
Midwestern Collegiate Conference	Butler	1999 Midwestern Collegiate Conference baseball tournament	Les Miller Field • Chicago, IL	Milwaukee
Mid-Continent Conference	Oral Roberts	1999 Mid-Continent Conference baseball tournament	J. L. Johnson Stadium • Tulsa, OK	Oral Roberts
Northeast Conference	North - Fairleigh Dickinson/Central Connecticut; South - Monmouth	1999 Northeast Conference baseball tournament	The Ballpark at Harbor Yard • Bridgeport, CT	Monmouth
Pacific-10 Conference	Stanford	No tournament		
Patriot League	Bucknell/Navy	1999 Patriot League baseball tournament	Bucknell Field • Lewisburg, PA	Navy
Southeastern Conference	Eastern - South Carolina; Western - LSU	1999 Southeastern Conference baseball tournament	Hoover Metropolitan Stadium • Hoover, AL	Alabama
Southern Conference	The Citadel	1999 Southern Conference baseball tournament	Joseph P. Riley Jr. Park • Charleston, SC	The Citadel
Southland Conference	Northeast Louisiana	1999 Southland Conference baseball tournament	Warhawk Field • Monroe, LA	Southwest Texas State
Trans America Athletic Conference	Florida Atlantic	1999 Trans America Athletic Conference baseball tournament	Osceola County Stadium • Kissimmee, FL	Jacksonville
West Coast Conference	Coast - Pepperdine; West - Loyola Marymount	1999 West Coast Conference Baseball Championship Series	Campus Sites	Loyola Marymount

== Conference standings ==
The following is an incomplete list of conference standings:

1999 Atlantic Coast Conference baseball standings
	Conf.				Overall
Team	W		L	PCT	W		L	PCT
No. 2 Florida State ‍†‍‍^{y}	22	–	2	.917	57	–	14	.803
No. 10 Wake Forest ‍‍‡‍^{y}	16	–	7	.696	47	–	16	.746
No. 13 Clemson ‍‍‍^{y}	13	–	10	.565	42	–	27	.609
No. 28 North Carolina ‍‍‍^{y}	13	–	11	.542	41	–	18	.695
Georgia Tech ‍‍‍	12	–	12	.500	38	–	20	.655
NC State ‍‍‍^{y}	11	–	13	.458	37	–	25	.597
Virginia ‍‍‍	8	–	15	.348	21	–	35	.375
Maryland ‍‍‍	6	–	17	.261	23	–	33	.411
Duke ‍‍‍	4	–	18	.182	24	–	31	.436
† – Conference champion ‡ – Tournament champion y – Invited to the NCAA tournament As of June 30, 1999; Rankings from Collegiate Baseball

1999 Big 12 Conference baseball standings
	Conf.				Overall
Team	W		L	PCT	W		L	PCT
No. 7 Texas A&M ‍†‍‍^{y}	23	–	6	.793	53	–	17	.757
No. 9 Baylor ‍‍‍^{y}	20	–	7	.741	50	–	15	.769
No. 22 Texas Tech ‍‍‍^{y}	18	–	8	.692	42	–	17	.712
No. 8 Oklahoma State ‍‍‍^{y}	18	–	9	.667	46	–	21	.687
Nebraska ‍‍‡‍^{y}	16	–	9	.640	42	–	18	.700
Texas ‍‍‍^{y}	17	–	13	.567	36	–	26	.581
Missouri ‍‍‍	14	–	13	.519	37	–	19	.661
Oklahoma ‍‍‍	12	–	18	.400	30	–	29	.508
Kansas State ‍‍‍	11	–	18	.379	26	–	29	.473
Kansas ‍‍‍	4	–	26	.133	14	–	40	.259
Iowa State ‍‍‍	2	–	28	.067	17	–	36	.321
† – Conference champion ‡ – Tournament champion y – Invited to the NCAA tournament As of June 30, 1999; Rankings from Collegiate Baseball

1999 Big East Conference baseball standings
	Conf.						Overall
Team	W		L		T	PCT	W		L		T	PCT
Notre Dame ‍†‍‍^{y}	20	–	5	–	0	.800	43	–	18	–	0	.705
Rutgers ‍‍‍^{y}	19	–	7	–	0	.731	37	–	21	–	0	.638
Providence ‍‍‡‍^{y}	18	–	8	–	0	.692	49	–	16	–	0	.754
Seton Hall ‍‍‍	14	–	11	–	0	.560	32	–	19	–	1	.625
St. John's ‍‍‍	13	–	11	–	1	.540	32	–	22	–	2	.589
West Virginia ‍‍‍	12	–	13	–	0	.480	29	–	28	–	0	.509
Villanova ‍‍‍	11	–	15	–	0	.423	27	–	26	–	1	.509
Pittsburgh ‍‍‍	11	–	15	–	0	.423	27	–	27	–	0	.500
Boston College ‍‍‍	10	–	15	–	1	.404	26	–	21	–	1	.552
Connecticut ‍‍‍	10	–	16	–	0	.385	27	–	24	–	0	.529
Georgetown ‍‍‍	2	–	24	–	0	.077	18	–	34	–	0	.346
† – Conference champion ‡ – Tournament champion y – Invited to the NCAA tournament As of June 30, 1999; Rankings from Collegiate Baseball

1999 Big South Conference baseball standings
	Conf.				Overall
Team	W		L	PCT	W		L	PCT
Coastal Carolina ‍†‍‍	10	–	2	.833	43	–	15	.741
Winthrop ‍‍‡‍^{y}	9	–	6	.600	40	–	23	.635
Radford ‍‍‍	7	–	7	.500	22	–	30	.423
Liberty ‍‍‍	7	–	8	.467	26	–	28	.481
Charleston Southern ‍‍‍	5	–	8	.385	26	–	32	.448
UNC Asheville ‍‍‍	4	–	11	.267	21	–	39	.350
Elon ‍‍‍	0	–	0	–	20	–	35	.364
High Point ‍‍‍	0	–	0	–	11	–	39	.220
† – Conference champion ‡ – Tournament champion y – Invited to the NCAA tournament As of June 30, 1999; Rankings from Collegiate Baseball

1999 Big Ten Conference baseball standings
	Conf.				Overall
Team	W		L	PCT	W		L	PCT
No. 11 Ohio State ‍†‍‍^{y}	25	–	3	.893	50	–	14	.781
Minnesota ‍‍‍^{y}	21	–	7	.750	46	–	18	.719
Illinois ‍‍‍	15	–	12	.556	24	–	22	.522
Michigan ‍‍‡‍^{y}	15	–	13	.536	34	–	30	.531
Indiana ‍‍‍	14	–	14	.500	37	–	17	.685
Penn State ‍‍‍	12	–	15	.444	32	–	23	.582
Michigan State ‍‍‍	10	–	17	.370	28	–	25	.528
Purdue ‍‍‍	10	–	17	.370	24	–	30	.444
Northwestern ‍‍‍	10	–	18	.357	24	–	29	.453
Iowa ‍‍‍	6	–	22	.214	22	–	34	.393
x – Division champion ‡ – Tournament champion y – Invited to the NCAA tournament As of June 30, 1999; Rankings from Collegiate Baseball

1999 Big West Conference baseball standings
	Conf.				Overall
Team	W		L	PCT	W		L	PCT
No. 6 Cal State Fullerton ‍†‍‍^{y}	25	–	5	.833	50	–	14	.781
No. 26 Nevada ‍‍‍^{y}	21	–	9	.700	38	–	20	.655
No. 29 Long Beach State ‍‍‍^{y}	19	–	11	.633	35	–	25	.583
Pacific ‍‍‍	17	–	13	.567	32	–	24	.571
UC Santa Barbara ‍‍‍	14	–	16	.467	27	–	26	.509
Cal Poly ‍‍‍	9	–	21	.300	21	–	34	.382
Sacramento State ‍‍‍	8	–	22	.267	18	–	39	.316
New Mexico State ‍‍‍	7	–	23	.233	18	–	38	.321
† – Conference champion y – Invited to the NCAA tournament As of June 30, 1999; Rankings from Collegiate Baseball

1999 Colonial Athletic Association baseball standings
	Conf.						Overall
Team	W		L		T	PCT	W		L		T	PCT
Richmond ‍†‍‍^{y}	15	–	5	–	0	.750	38	–	15	–	0	.717
No. 18 East Carolina ‍‍‡‍^{y}	14	–	6	–	0	.700	44	–	14	–	0	.759
VCU ‍‍‍^{y}	14	–	6	–	0	.700	41	–	20	–	0	.672
George Mason ‍‍‍	9	–	12	–	0	.429	30	–	24	–	1	.555
Old Dominion ‍‍‍	7	–	11	–	0	.389	38	–	17	–	0	.691
UNC Wilmington ‍‍‍	8	–	13	–	0	.381	30	–	26	–	0	.536
William & Mary ‍‍‍	7	–	12	–	0	.368	29	–	24	–	0	.547
James Madison ‍‍‍	6	–	15	–	0	.286	22	–	35	–	1	.388
† – Conference champion ‡ – Tournament champion y – Invited to the NCAA tournament As of June 30, 1999; Rankings from Collegiate Baseball

1999 Conference USA baseball standings
	Conf.				Overall
Team	W		L	PCT	W		L	PCT
No. 24 Houston ‍†‍‍^{y}	20	–	7	.741	40	–	24	.625
No. 21 Tulane ‍‍‡‍^{y}	19	–	8	.704	48	–	17	.738
Southern Miss ‍‍‍^{y}	18	–	9	.667	40	–	23	.635
Memphis ‍‍‍	15	–	12	.556	28	–	26	.519
South Florida ‍‍‍	15	–	12	.556	31	–	27	.534
Louisville ‍‍‍	14	–	13	.519	37	–	19	.661
UNC Charlotte ‍‍‍	13	–	14	.481	26	–	26	.500
Cincinnati ‍‍‍	9	–	18	.333	30	–	29	.508
UAB ‍‍‍	7	–	20	.259	22	–	31	.415
Saint Louis ‍‍‍	5	–	22	.185	19	–	39	.328
† – Conference champion ‡ – Tournament champion y – Invited to the NCAA tournament As of June 30, 1999; Rankings from Collegiate Baseball

1999 NCAA Division I baseball independents standings
	Conf.				Overall
Team	W		L	PCT	W		L	PCT
No. 1 Miami (FL) ‍‍‍^{y}		–		–	50	–	13	.794
Grand Canyon ‍‍‍		–		–	36	–	17	.679
Texas–Pan American ‍‍‍		–		–	30	–	22	.577
Belmont ‍‍‍		–		–	28	–	24	.538
Cal State Northridge ‍‍‍		–		–	28	–	24	.538
C. W. Post ‍‍‍		–		–	15	–	28	.349
NYIT ‍‍‍		–		–	15	–	32	.319
Pace ‍‍‍		–		–	14	–	35	.286
Southern Utah ‍‍‍		–		–	14	–	35	.286
Hawaii–Hilo ‍‍‍		–		–	9	–	37	.196
y – Invited to the NCAA tournament As of June 30, 1999; Rankings from Collegiate Baseball

1999 Ivy League baseball standings
	Conf.				Overall
Team	W		L	PCT	W		L	PCT
Lou Gehrig
Princeton ^{x}‍‍‍	15	–	5	.750	25	–	20	.556
Columbia ‍‍‍	7	–	13	.350	13	–	27	.325
Cornell ‍‍‍	7	–	13	.350	12	–	28	.300
Penn ‍‍‍	6	–	14	.300	9	–	28	.243
Red Rolfe
Harvard ^{x}‍‍‡‍^{y}	16	–	4	.800	28	–	20	.583
Brown ‍‍‍	13	–	7	.650	23	–	18	.561
Dartmouth ‍‍‍	9	–	11	.450	17	–	24	.415
Yale ‍‍‍	6	–	14	.300	16	–	29	.356
x – Division champion ‡ – Championship Series champion y – Invited to the NCAA tournament As of June 30, 1999; Rankings from Collegiate Baseball

1999 Metro Atlantic Athletic Conference baseball standings
	Conf.				Overall
Team	W		L	PCT	W		L	PCT
Northern
Siena ^{x}‍‍‡‍^{y}	21	–	5	.808	34	–	22	.607
Le Moyne ‍‍‍	17	–	9	.654	21	–	16	.568
Marist ‍‍‍	14	–	12	.538	27	–	23	.540
Niagara ‍‍‍	11	–	14	.440	13	–	22	.371
Canisius ‍‍‍	8	–	18	.308	13	–	26	.333
Southern
Iona ^{x}‍‍‍	15	–	11	.577	23	–	27	.460
Rider ‍‍‍	14	–	11	.560	26	–	30	.464
Fairfield ‍‍‍	13	–	13	.500	23	–	23	.500
Manhattan ‍‍‍	12	–	14	.462	22	–	27	.449
Saint Peter's ‍‍‍	4	–	22	.154	10	–	36	.217
x – Division champion ‡ – Tournament champion y – Invited to the NCAA tournament As of June 30, 1999; Rankings from Collegiate Baseball

1999 Mid-American Conference baseball standings
	Conf.						Overall
Team	W		L		T	PCT	W		L		T	PCT
East
Bowling Green ^{x}‍‍‡‍^{y}	21	–	10	–	0	.677	36	–	24	–	0	.600
Miami ‍‍‍	20	–	12	–	0	.625	34	–	27	–	0	.557
Kent State ‍‍‍	19	–	12	–	0	.613	33	–	25	–	0	.569
Ohio ‍‍‍	17	–	13	–	0	.567	26	–	28	–	0	.481
Akron ‍‍‍	10	–	22	–	0	.313	10	–	22	–	0	.313
Marshall ‍‍‍	4	–	26	–	1	.145	12	–	43	–	1	.223
West
Ball State ^{x}‍‍‍	25	–	6	–	0	.806	42	–	18	–	0	.700
Toledo ‍‍‍	23	–	9	–	0	.719	39	–	20	–	0	.661
Western Michigan ‍‍‍	20	–	12	–	0	.625	30	–	28	–	0	.517
Central Michigan ‍‍‍	15	–	15	–	0	.500	24	–	32	–	0	.429
Eastern Michigan ‍‍‍	12	–	19	–	1	.391	21	–	32	–	1	.398
Northern Illinois ‍‍‍	1	–	31	–	0	.031	4	–	51	–	1	.080
† – Conference champion ‡ – Tournament champion y – Invited to the NCAA tournament As of June 30, 1999; Rankings from Collegiate Baseball

1999 Mid-Continent Conference baseball standings
	Conf.						Overall
Team	W		L		T	PCT	W		L		T	PCT
Oral Roberts ‍†‍‡‍^{y}	14	–	4	–	0	.778	46	–	15	–	0	.754
Valparaiso ‍‍‍	12	–	8	–	0	.600	30	–	27	–	0	.526
Western Illinois ‍‍‍	9	–	9	–	0	.500	14	–	35	–	0	.286
Chicago State ‍‍‍	9	–	11	–	0	.450	19	–	33	–	1	.368
Youngstown State ‍‍‍	8	–	10	–	0	.444	20	–	36	–	0	.357
IUPUI ‍‍‍	4	–	14	–	0	.222	7	–	43	–	1	.147
Oakland ‍‍‍	0	–	0	–	0	–	17	–	25	–	0	.405
‡ – Tournament champion y – Invited to the NCAA tournament As of June 30, 1999; Rankings from Collegiate Baseball

1999 Midwestern Collegiate Conference baseball standings
	Conf.				Overall
Team	W		L	PCT	W		L	PCT
Butler ‍‍‍	14	–	6	.700	29	–	27	.518
Milwaukee ‍‍‡‍^{y}	11	–	7	.611	31	–	29	.517
Cleveland State ‍‍‍	12	–	8	.600	22	–	34	.393
Wright State ‍‍‍	8	–	10	.444	26	–	28	.481
UIC ‍‍‍	6	–	12	.333	18	–	30	.375
Detroit ‍‍‍	5	–	13	.278	14	–	33	.298
‡ – Tournament champion y – Invited to the NCAA Tournament; As of June 30, 1999; Rankings from Collegiate Baseball

1999 Northeast Conference baseball standings
	Conf.						Overall
Team	W		L		T	PCT	W		L		T	PCT
North
Fairleigh Dickinson ^{x}‍‍‍	12	–	8	–	0	.600	22	–	24	–	0	.478
Central Connecticut ^{x}‍‍‍	12	–	8	–	0	.600	22	–	22	–	1	.500
St. Francis ‍‍‍	11	–	9	–	0	.550	18	–	30	–	0	.375
Long Island ‍‍‍	11	–	9	–	0	.550	25	–	19	–	0	.568
Quinnipiac ‍‍‍	7	–	13	–	0	.350	17	–	23	–	0	.425
South
Monmouth ^{x}‍‍‡‍^{y}	12	–	7	–	0	.632	26	–	24	–	0	.520
Wagner ‍‍‍	10	–	9	–	0	.526	20	–	23	–	0	.465
UMBC ‍‍‍	8	–	11	–	0	.421	20	–	22	–	0	.476
Mount St. Mary's ‍‍‍	5	–	14	–	0	.263	12	–	31	–	0	.279
x – Division champion ‡ – Tournament champion y – Invited to the NCAA tournament Rankings from Collegiate Baseball

1999 Pacific-10 Conference baseball standings
	Conf.				Overall
Team	W		L	PCT	W		L	PCT
No. 3 Stanford ‍†‍‍^{y}	19	–	5	.792	50	–	15	.769
No. 12 Southern California ‍‍‍^{y}	17	–	7	.708	36	–	26	.581
Arizona ‍‍‍^{y}	13	–	11	.542	33	–	23	.589
UCLA ‍‍‍^{y}	13	–	11	.542	31	–	33	.484
Arizona State ‍‍‍	12	–	12	.500	39	–	21	.650
Washington ‍‍‍	12	–	12	.500	33	–	23	.589
California ‍‍‍	11	–	13	.458	27	–	31	.466
Oregon State ‍‍‍	7	–	17	.292	19	–	35	.352
Washington State ‍‍‍	4	–	20	.167	24	–	31	.436
† – Conference champion y – Invited to the NCAA tournament As of June 30, 1999; Rankings from Collegiate Baseball

1999 Patriot League baseball standings
	Conf.						Overall
Team	W		L		T	PCT	W		L		T	PCT
Bucknell ‍†‍‍	15	–	5	–	0	.750	25	–	28	–	0	.472
Navy ‍†‍‡‍^{y}	15	–	5	–	0	.750	27	–	22	–	1	.550
Holy Cross ‍‍‍	9	–	11	–	0	.450	14	–	26	–	0	.350
Army ‍‍‍	9	–	11	–	0	.450	15	–	28	–	0	.349
Lehigh ‍‍‍	8	–	12	–	0	.400	14	–	28	–	0	.333
Lafayette ‍‍‍	4	–	16	–	0	.200	8	–	31	–	0	.205
‡ – Tournament champion y – Invited to the NCAA tournament As of June 30, 1999; Rankings from Collegiate Baseball

1999 Southeastern Conference baseball standings
	Conf.				Overall
Team	W		L	PCT	W		L	PCT
Eastern Division
South Carolina ^{x}‍‍‍	15	–	15	.500	35	–	23	.603
Kentucky ‍‍‍	13	–	17	.433	25	–	32	.439
Florida ‍‍‍	13	–	17	.433	31	–	25	.554
Tennessee ‍‍‍	10	–	20	.333	28	–	28	.500
Georgia ‍‍‍	8	–	20	.286	25	–	30	.455
Vanderbilt ‍‍‍	8	–	22	.267	22	–	33	.400
Western Division
No. 17 Arkansas ^{x}‍†‍‍^{y}	22	–	8	.733	42	–	23	.646
No. 4 Alabama ‍‍‡‍^{y}	21	–	9	.700	53	–	16	.768
No. 14 LSU ‍‍‍^{y}	18	–	11	.621	41	–	24	.631
No. 15 Auburn ‍‍‍^{y}	18	–	12	.600	46	–	19	.708
Ole Miss ‍‍‍^{y}	17	–	13	.567	34	–	28	.548
No. 30 Mississippi State ‍‍‍^{y}	15	–	14	.517	42	–	21	.667
x – Division champion † – Conference champion ‡ – Tournament champion y – Invited to the NCAA tournament As of June 30, 1999; Rankings from Collegiate Baseball

1999 Southern Conference baseball standings
	Conf.				Overall
Team	W		L	PCT	W		L	PCT
The Citadel ‍†‍‡‍^{y}	24	–	5	.828	41	–	20	.672
College of Charleston ‍‍‍	19	–	10	.655	31	–	24	.564
Western Carolina ‍‍‍	18	–	10	.643	36	–	22	.621
East Tennessee State ‍‍‍	18	–	11	.621	29	–	25	.537
UNC Greensboro ‍‍‍	16	–	12	.571	29	–	26	.527
Georgia Southern ‍‍‍	13	–	15	.464	29	–	29	.500
VMI ‍‍‍	13	–	16	.448	22	–	27	.449
Furman ‍‍‍	13	–	17	.433	22	–	35	.386
Appalachian State ‍‍‍	10	–	20	.333	14	–	38	.269
Davidson ‍‍‍	9	–	21	.300	11	–	37	.229
Wofford ‍‍‍	7	–	23	.233	14	–	36	.280
† – Conference champion ‡ – SoCon Tournament champion y – Invited to the NCAA tournament As of June 30, 1999; Rankings from Collegiate Baseball

1999 Southland Conference baseball standings
	Conf.				Overall
Team	W		L	PCT	W		L	PCT
Northeast Louisiana ‍†‍‍^{y}	19	–	7	.731	36	–	22	.621
Northwestern State ‍‍‍	18	–	9	.667	38	–	21	.644
Southwest Texas State ‍‍‡‍^{y}	15	–	12	.556	27	–	32	.458
Texas–San Antonio ‍‍‍	15	–	12	.556	27	–	33	.450
Texas–Arlington ‍‍‍	14	–	13	.519	26	–	35	.426
Southeastern Louisiana ‍‍‍	13	–	14	.481	28	–	29	.491
Lamar ‍‍‍	12	–	14	.462	34	–	21	.618
McNeese State ‍‍‍	12	–	15	.444	31	–	25	.554
Sam Houston State ‍‍‍	8	–	19	.296	22	–	33	.400
Nicholls State ‍‍‍	8	–	19	.296	20	–	32	.385
† – Conference champion ‡ – Tournament champion y – Invited to the NCAA tournament As of June 30, 1999; Rankings from Collegiate Baseball

1999 Trans America Athletic Conference baseball standings
	Conf.				Overall
Team	W		L	PCT	W		L	PCT
No. 20 Florida Atlantic ‍†‍‍^{y}	26	–	4	.867	54	–	9	.857
Jacksonville ‍‍‡‍^{y}	22	–	8	.733	41	–	23	.641
Mercer ‍‍‍	19	–	11	.633	36	–	24	.600
UCF ‍‍‍	19	–	11	.633	38	–	21	.644
Troy State ‍‍‍	15	–	15	.500	31	–	28	.525
Centenary ‍‍‍	14	–	16	.467	21	–	35	.375
Georgia State ‍‍‍	13	–	17	.433	23	–	33	.411
Jacksonville State ‍‍‍	13	–	17	.433	22	–	30	.423
Stetson ‍‍‍	11	–	19	.367	23	–	31	.426
Samford ‍‍‍	8	–	22	.267	20	–	33	.377
Campbell ‍‍‍	5	–	25	.167	24	–	32	.429
† – Conference champion ‡ – Tournament champion y – Invited to the NCAA tournament As of June 30, 1999; Rankings from Collegiate Baseball

1999 West Coast Conference baseball standings
	Conf.						Overall
Team	W		L		T	PCT	W		L		T	PCT
West
No. 19 Pepperdine ^{x}‍‍‍^{y}	21	–	9	–	0	.700	46	–	16	–	0	.742
Gonzaga ‍‍‍	14	–	14	–	1	.500	27	–	23	–	2	.538
San Diego ‍‍‍	13	–	16	–	1	.450	28	–	27	–	1	.509
San Francisco ‍‍‍	11	–	18	–	0	.379	21	–	35	–	1	.377
Coast
Loyola Marymount ^{x‡y} ‍‍‍	18	–	12	–	0	.600	33	–	28	–	0	.541
Portland ‍‍‍	16	–	14	–	0	.533	23	–	28	–	0	.451
Saint Mary's ‍‍‍	14	–	16	–	0	.467	22	–	32	–	0	.407
Santa Clara ‍‍‍	11	–	19	–	0	.367	20	–	36	–	0	.357
x – Division champion ‡ – Championship Series champion y – Invited to the NCAA tournament As of June 30, 1999; Rankings from Collegiate Baseball

== College World Series ==
The 1999 season marked the fifty third NCAA baseball tournament, which culminated with the eight team College World Series. The College World Series was held in Omaha, Nebraska. The eight teams played a double-elimination format, with Miami (FL) claiming their third championship with a 6–5 win over Florida State in the final.

=== Bracket ===
First round
5	Alabama	11
Oklahoma State	3
8	Rice	4
1	Miami (FL)	8
Oklahoma State	2
8	Rice	7
6	Stanford	9
3	Cal State Fullerton	2
7	Texas A&M	3
2	Florida State	7
3	Cal State Fullerton	4
7	Texas A&M	2

Second round
5	Alabama	1
1	Miami (FL)	8
8	Rice	5
5	Alabama	6
6	Stanford	10
2	Florida State	6
3	Cal State-Fullerton	2
2	Florida State	7

Semifinals
1	Miami (FL)	5	—
5	Alabama	2	—
6	Stanford	6	11
2	Florida State	8	14^{13}

Finals
1	Miami (FL)	6
2	Florida State	5
