= 2026 Yale Bulldogs baseball team =

American college baseball season

2026 Yale Bulldogs baseball

Ivy League regular season and tournament champions

NCAA Eugene Regional, 0–2
- Conference: Ivy League
- Record: 30–15–1 (14–6–1 Ivy)
- Head coach: Brian Hamm (4th season)
- Assistant coach: Trevor Wren (2nd season)
- Hitting coach: Corey Keane (5th season)
- Pitching coach: Chris Wojick (2nd season)
- Captains: Davis Hanson; Colin Sloan
- Home stadium: George H. W. Bush Field

2026 Ivy League baseball standings
	Conf.						Overall
Team	W		L		T	PCT	W		L		T	PCT
Yale ‍†‍‡‍^{y}	14	–	6	–	1	.690	30	–	13	–	1	.693
Penn ‍‍‍	14	–	7	–	0	.667	20	–	22	–	0	.476
Brown ‍‍‍	13	–	8	–	0	.619	23	–	20	–	0	.535
Columbia ‍‍‍	10	–	10	–	1	.500	16	–	25	–	1	.393
Harvard ‍‍‍	9	–	12	–	0	.429	11	–	26	–	0	.297
Princeton ‍‍‍	9	–	13	–	0	.409	15	–	27	–	0	.357
Cornell ‍‍‍	8	–	13	–	0	.381	11	–	26	–	0	.297
Dartmouth ‍‍‍	8	–	15	–	0	.348	15	–	25	–	0	.375
† – Conference champion ‡ – Tournament champion y – Invited to the NCAA Tournament; As of May 17, 2026; Rankings from D1Baseball

The 2026 Yale Bulldogs baseball team represented Yale University during the 2026 NCAA Division I baseball season. The Bulldogs played their home games at George H. W. Bush Field in New Haven, Connecticut, United States, as a member of the Ivy League. They were led by fourth-year head coach Brian Hamm.

Yale won their second-consecutive Ivy League regular season title, and also won the 2026 Ivy League baseball tournament. They qualified for the 2026 NCAA Division I baseball tournament in the Ivy League's automatic berth. There Yale played in the Eugene Regional where they went 0–2.

== Preseason ==
=== Ivy League Coaches Poll ===
The Ivy League Coaches Poll was released February 12, 2026, and the Bulldogs were picked to finish second overall in the conference.

Coaches Poll
Predicted finish	Team	Votes (1st place)
1	Columbia	118 (9)
2	Yale	116 (7)
3	Penn	100
4	Harvard	73
5	Princeton	49
6	Cornell	45
7	Dartmouth	41
8	Brown	34

== Personnel ==
=== Starters ===
Lineup
Pos.	No.	Player.	Year
C	9	Owen Turner	Sophomore
1B	8	Davis Hanson	Senior
2B	13	Jackson Hayes	Freshman
3B	5	Jack Dauer	Sophomore
SS	10	Colin Sloan	Junior
LF	24	Chris Diprima	Junior
CF	28	Kaiden Dossa	Junior
RF	12	Bryce Miller	Freshman
DH	1	Garrett Larsen	Junior

Weekend pitching rotation
Day	No.	Player.	Year
Friday	16	Tate Evans	Senior
Saturday	17	Jack Ohman	Sophomore
Sunday	25	Daniel Cohen	Senior

=== Roster ===
2026 Yale Bulldogs baseball team
Players
Coaches

#	Pos.	Name	B/T	Height	Weight	Year	Home town
1	UTL	Garrett Larsen	R/R	5 ft 9 in (1.75 m)	180 lb (82 kg)	Jr	Fairfield, CT
4	RHP	Matt Pearch	R/R	6 ft 2 in (1.88 m)	210 lb (95 kg)	Fr	Dunwoody, GA
5	C	Jack Dauer	R/R	6 ft 0 in (1.83 m)	200 lb (91 kg)	So	Royal Oak, MI
6	UTL	Pablo Rodriguez	R/R	5 ft 10 in (1.78 m)	185 lb (84 kg)	Jr	Santa Clarita, CA
7	OF	Brady Ruiz-Weiss	L/L	5 ft 10 in (1.78 m)	180 lb (82 kg)	So	Potomac, MD
8	INF	Davis Hanson	R/R	6 ft 3 in (1.91 m)	215 lb (98 kg)	Sr	Winston-Salem, NC
9	C	Owen Turner	R/R	6 ft 0 in (1.83 m)	195 lb (88 kg)	So	Oxford, MI
10	INF	Colin Sloan	R/R	6 ft 2 in (1.88 m)	215 lb (98 kg)	Jr	Bellaire, TX
12	C	Bryce Miller	R/R	5 ft 10 in (1.78 m)	180 lb (82 kg)	Fr	San Diego, CA
13	INF	Jackson Hays	R/R	6 ft 4 in (1.93 m)	195 lb (88 kg)	Fr	Wylie, TX
14	RHP	Nick West	R/R	6 ft 3 in (1.91 m)	185 lb (84 kg)	Fr	Nacogdoches, TX
15	RHP	Alex Hwang	R/R	6 ft 1 in (1.85 m)	187 lb (85 kg)	So	New York City, NY
16	RHP	Tate Evans	R/R	6 ft 0 in (1.83 m)	180 lb (82 kg)	Sr	Flower Mound, TX
17	RHP	Jack Ohman	L/R	6 ft 0 in (1.83 m)	180 lb (82 kg)	So	Mesa, AZ
19	RHP	Ethan Lewis	R/R	6 ft 1 in (1.85 m)	200 lb (91 kg)	Sr	Golden, CO
20	UTL	Dylan Uribe	R/R	5 ft 10 in (1.78 m)	195 lb (88 kg)	So	Round Rock, TX
21	UTL	Ricky Nunez	R/R	6 ft 1 in (1.85 m)	205 lb (93 kg)	So	Queens, NY
22	RHP	Teo Spadaccini	R/R	6 ft 6 in (1.98 m)	230 lb (104 kg)	Jr	Lexington, MA
23	RHP	Ben Winslow	R/R	6 ft 4 in (1.93 m)	220 lb (100 kg)	Jr	Charlottesville, VA
24	UTL	Chris DiPrima	R/R	5 ft 10 in (1.78 m)	185 lb (84 kg)	Jr	San Diego, CA
25	RHP	Daniel Cohen	R/R	6 ft 3 in (1.91 m)	190 lb (86 kg)	Sr	Ganesvoort, NY
26	LHP	Levi Strahm	L/L	5 ft 10 in (1.78 m)	180 lb (82 kg)	Jr	Lewsville, NC
27	RHP	Amir Eltaki	R/R	6 ft 1 in (1.85 m)	210 lb (95 kg)	Jr	Franklin Lakes, NJ
28	OF	Kaiden Dossa	R/R	6 ft 1 in (1.85 m)	200 lb (91 kg)	Jr	Mini Valley, CA
29	RHP	Brett Faccio	R/R	6 ft 2 in (1.88 m)	225 lb (102 kg)	Fr	Midland, MI
31	INF	Chace Chaplin	R/R	5 ft 9 in (1.75 m)	195 lb (88 kg)	Jr	Apex, NC
32	LHP	DJ Peterson	L/L	6 ft 0 in (1.83 m)	215 lb (98 kg)	So	Berwyn, PA
40	OF	Matt Hutchinson	R/R	6 ft 3 in (1.91 m)	235 lb (107 kg)	Fr	Dallas, TX

Head coach

Brian Hamm

Assistant coach(es)

Trevor Wren
Corey Keane
Chris Wojick

Legend

- (C) Team captain
- (S) Suspended
- (I) Ineligible
- Injured
- Current redshirt

Roster
Last update: May 10, 2026

== Game log ==
2026 Yale Bulldogs baseball game log (30–15–1)
Regular season: 27–13–1 (Home: 15–4; Away: 12–8–1; Neutral: 1–0)

February: 2–3 (Home: 0–0; Away: 2–2; Neutral: 1–0)
Date	TV	Opponent	Rank	Stadium	Score	Win	Loss	Save	Attendance	Overall	Ivy
Andre Dawson HBCU Classic
February 20		at Bethune–Cookman*		Jackie Robinson Ballpark; Daytona Beach, FL	**L** 5–7	Miller (1–0)	**Winslow** (0–1)	—	251	0–1	—
February 21		vs. Jackson State*		Holman Stadium; Vero Beach, FL	**L** 5–6	Turner (1–0)	**Cohen** (0–1)	Edwards (1)	1,876	0–2	—
February 22		at Bethune–Cookman*		Jackie Robinson Ballpark	**W** 8–3	**Winslow** (1–1)	Evans (0–2)	—	112	1–2	—
February 27	ESPN+	at Pepperdine*		Eddy D. Field Stadium; Malibu, CA	**W** 7–1	**Ohman** (1–0)	Scavone (0–1)	—	448	2–2	—
February 28	ESPN+	at Pepperdine*		Eddy D. Field Stadium	**L** 3–4	Wechsberg (1–0)	**Winslow** (1–2)	—	451	2–3	—

March: 11–6 (Home: 7–3; Away: 4–3; Neutral: 0–0)
Date	TV	Opponent	Rank	Stadium	Score	Win	Loss	Save	Attendance	Overall	Ivy
March 1	ESPN+	at Pepperdine*		Eddy D. Field Stadium	**W** 10–8	**Spadaccini** (1–0)	Pace (0–1)	—	470	3–3	—
March 4	ESPN+	Manhattan*		George H. W. Bush Field; New Haven, CT	**Canceled** (inclement weather)						
March 6	ESPN+	at George Washington*		Barcroft Park; Arlington, VA	**W** 18–3	**Evans** (1–0)	Haug (1–2)	**Spadaccini** (1)	102	4–3	—
March 7	ESPN+	at George Washington*		Barcroft Park	**L** 5–6	Miller (1–0)	**Hwang** (0–1)	Lebel (2)	119	4–4	—
March 8	ESPN+	at George Washington*		Barcroft Park	**W** 15–11	**Cohen** (1–1)	Crochet (0–1)	**Evans** (1)	169	5–4	—
March 10	ESPN+	Sacred Heart*		George H. W. Bush Field	**W** 4–2	**Faccio** (1–0)	Alejandro (0–1)	**West** (1)	73	6–4	—
March 13	ESPN+	Albany*		George H. W. Bush Field	**L** 2–4^{(13)}	Enea (1–0)	**Evans** (1–1)	Kneller (1)	103	6–5	—
March 14	ESPN+	Albany*		George H. W. Bush Field	**W** 6–5	**Spadaccini** (2–0)	Banner (0–3)	—	326	7–5	—
March 15	ESPN+	Albany*		George H. W. Bush Field	**W** 15–7	**Hwang** (1–1)	Nalawadi (0–2)	—	217	8–5	—
March 18		at Quinnipiac*		Quinnipiac Baseball Field; Hamden, CT	**L** 9–15	Lajoie (1–0)	**West** (0–1)	—	126	8–6	—
March 21 (Note: Part of a doubleheader.)	ESPN+	Brown		George H. W. Bush Field	**W** 14–7	**Evans** (2–1)	Dubie (1–3)	—	187	9–6	1–0
March 21	ESPN+	Brown		George H. W. Bush Field	**L** 1–2	Nelson (2–1)	**Winslow** (1–3)	Keel (3)	187	9–7	1–1
March 22	ESPN+	Brown		George H. W. Bush Field	**L** 0–8	Reid (1–2)	**Cohen** (1–2)	—	139	9–8	1–2
March 25		at Iona*		Flowers Park; New Rochelle, NY	**W** 7–6^{(10)}	**West** (1–1)	Mata (1–1)	—	41	10–8	—
March 28	ESPN+	Penn		George H. W. Bush Field	**W** 16–14	**Evans** (3–1)	Darling (0–1)	—	222	11–8	2–2
March 29	ESPN+	Penn		George H. W. Bush Field	**W** 4–0	**Cohen** (2–2)	Coyne (2–3)	—	177	12–8	3–2
March 29	ESPN+	Penn		George H. W. Bush Field	**W** 3–2^{(10)}	**Spadaccini** (3–0)	von Zuben (0–1)	—	177	13–8	4–2
March 31		at Fairfield*		Alumni Baseball Diamond; Fairfield, CT	**L** 6–9	Kelly (1–0)	**Lewis** (0–1)	Maiorano (4)	112	13–9	—

April: 10–4–1 (Home: 4–1; Away: 6–3–1; Neutral: 0–0)
Date	TV	Opponent	Rank	Stadium	Score	Win	Loss	Save	Attendance	Overall	Ivy
April 3	ESPN+	at Princeton		Bill Clarke Field; Princeton, NJ	**W** 7–6	**Cohen** (3–2)	Eaton (1–4)	**Evans** (2)	203	14–9	5–2
April 4	ESPN+	at Princeton		Bill Clarke Field	**W** 12–7	**Ohman** (2–0)	Kim (2–3)	—	164	15–9	6–2
April 4	ESPN+	at Princeton		Bill Clarke Field	**W** 5–4	**Hwang** (2–1)	Gilman (0–1)	—	150	16–9	7–2
April 8		New Haven*		George H. W. Bush Field	**W** 20–0^{(7)}	**West** (2–1)	Eckrote (1–2)	—	107	17–9	—
The Series
April 11	ESPN+	Harvard		George H. W. Bush Field	**L** 3–5	Colasante (3–4)	**Ohman** (2–1)	McHugh (2)	329	17–10	7–3
April 11	ESPN+	Harvard		George H. W. Bush Field	**W** 9–6	**Cohen** (4–2)	Abler (1–3)	**Hwang** (1)	329	18–10	8–3
April 12	ESPN+	Harvard		George H. W. Bush Field	**W** 5–2	**Evans** (4–1)	Alagheband (0–3)	—	300	19–10	9–3
March 15	ESPN+	Quinnipiac*		George H. W. Bush Field	**W** 6–5	**West** (3–1)	Rusinak (0–1)	—	167	20–10	—
April 17	ESPN+	at Cornell		Booth Field; Ithaca, NY	**L** 3–5	Yoshida (1–1)	**Cohen** (4–3)	—	128	20–11	9–4
April 18	ESPN+	at Cornell		Booth Field	**W** 16–5	**Ohman** (3–1)	Holcombe (1–6)	**Winslow** (1)	207	21–11	10–4
April 18	ESPN+	at Cornell		Booth Field	**W** 6–3	**Evans** (5–1)	Hamill (0–3)	**Spadaccini** (2)	274	22–11	11–4
April 22		at Sacred Heart*		Veterans Memorial Park; Fairfield, CT	**W** 14–5	**Spadaccini** (4–0)	Emrich (0–2)	—	108	23–11	—
April 24	ESPN+	at Columbia		Phillip Satow Stadium; New York City, NY	**L** 4–6	Santana (4–3)	**Ohman** (3–2)	Kleinhans (2)	383	23–12	11–5
April 26	ESPN+	at Columbia		Phillip Satow Stadium	**L** 8–9	Kleinhans (2–2)	**Spadaccini** (4–1)	—	422	23–13	11–6
April 26	ESPN+	at Columbia		Phillip Satow Stadium	**T** 15–15	—	—	—	422	23–13–1	11–6–1
April 28		at Central Connecticut*		CCSU Baseball Field; New Britain, CT	**Canceled** (inclement weather)						

May: 4–0 (Home: 4–0; Away: 0–0; Neutral: 0–0)
Date	TV	Opponent	Rank	Stadium	Score	Win	Loss	Save	Attendance	Overall	Ivy
May 6		Iona*		George H. W. Bush Field	**W** 12–1	**West** (4–1)	Neville (0–1)	—	79	24–13–1	—
May 8	ESPN+	Dartmouth		George H. W. Bush Field	**W** 7–3	**Ohman** (4–2)	Isler (1–6)	—	147	25–13–1	12–6–1
May 10	ESPN+	Dartmouth		George H. W. Bush Field	**W** 3–2	**Evans** (6–1)	Kugler (2–4)	**Winslow** (2)	387	26–13–1	13–6–1
May 10	ESPN+	Dartmouth		George H. W. Bush Field	**W** 4–1	**Cohen** (5–3)	Klaric (0–1)	—	387	27–13–1	14–6–1

Postseason: 3–2 (Home: 3–0; Away: 0–1; Neutral: 0–1)

Ivy League tournament: 3–0 (Home: 3–0; Away: 0–0; Neutral: 0–0)
Date	TV	Opponent	Rank	Stadium	Score	Win	Loss	Save	Attendance	Overall	ILT Record
May 15	ESPN+	(4) Columbia	(1)	George H. W. Bush Field	**W** 12–3	**Ohman** (5–2)	Santana (5–5)	—	431	28–13–1	1–0
May 16	ESPN+	(3) Brown	(1)	George H. W. Bush Field	**W** 5–2	**Evans** (7–1)	Reid (4–4)	—	407	29–13–1	2–0
May 17	ESPN+	(3) Brown	(1)	George H. W. Bush Field	**W** 7–5	**Spadaccini** (5–1)	Piwnicki (4–2)	**Ohman** (1)	427	30–13–1	2–0

NCAA tournament: 0–2 (Home: 0–0; Away: 0–1; Neutral: 0–1)
Date	TV	Opponent	Rank	Stadium	Score	Win	Loss	Save	Attendance	Overall	NCAAT Record
May 29	ESPN+	at (1) No. 15 Oregon*	(4)	PK Park; Eugene, OR	**L** 2–14	Twist (4–0)	**Ohman** (5–3)	—	4,278	30–14–1	0–1
May 30	ESPN+	vs. No. 8 (2) Oregon State*	(4)	PK Park	**L** 2–9	Segura (6–2)	**Owens** (7–2)	—	3,945	30–15–1	0–2

Legend: = Win = Loss = Tie = Canceled
Bold = Yale team member * Non-conference game
Rankings are based on the team's current ranking in the D1Baseball poll.

Schedule Notes

== Rankings ==
Ranking movements Legend: ██ Increase in ranking ██ Decrease in ranking — = Not ranked RV = Received votes
	Week																	
Poll	Pre	1	2	3	4	5	6	7	8	9	10	11	12	13	14	15	16	Final
Coaches'	—	—*	—	—	—	—	—	—	—	—	—	—	—	—				
Baseball America	—	—	—	—	—	—	—	—	—	—	—	—	—	—				
NCBWA†	RV	RV	—	—	—	—	—	—	—	—	RV	rv	rv	rv				
D1Baseball	—	—	—	—	—	—	—	—	—	—	—	—	—	—				
Perfect Game	—	—	—	—	—	—	—	—	—	—	—	—	—	—				

† NCBWA ranks 30 teams in their preseason poll, but only ranks 25 teams weekly during the season.
* A new poll was not released for this week, so for comparison purposes, the previous week's ranking is inserted in this week's slot.
