= Visalia Rawhide =

- Founded in 1946; Visalia, California
Team logo
Cap insignia

Minor league affiliations
- Class: Single-A (2021–present)
- Previous classes: Class A-Advanced (1990–2020); Class A (1968–1989); Class C (1946–1962)
- League: California League (1946–present)
- Division: North Division

Major league affiliations
- Team: Arizona Diamondbacks (2007–present); Tampa Bay Devil Rays (2005–2006); Colorado Rockies (2003–2004, 1993–1994); Oakland Athletics (1997–2002); Co-op (1995–1996); Minnesota Twins (1976–1992); New York Mets (1968–1975); Chicago White Sox (1962); Kansas City Athletics (1960–1961); Cincinnati Reds (1953–1959); Chicago Cubs (1946–1952)

Minor league titles
- League titles (3): 1971; 1978; 2019
- Division titles (3): 2015; 2018; 2019
- First-half titles (1): 2016
- Second-half titles (1): 2024
- Wild card berths (1): 2024

Team data
- Name: Visalia Rawhide (2009–present); Visalia Oaks (1995–2008, 1976–1992); Central Valley Rockies (1993–1994); Visalia Mets (1968–1975); Visalia White Sox (1962); Visalia Athletics (1960–1961); Visalia Redlegs (1957–1959); Visalia Cubs (1954–1956, 1946–1952); Visalia Stars (1953)
- Mascot: Tipper
- Ballpark: Valley Strong Ballpark (1946–present)
- Owner(s)/ Operator(s): First Pitch Entertainment, LLC
- General manager: Mike Candela & Julian Rifkind
- Manager: Dee Garner
- Website: milb.com/visalia

The Visalia Rawhide are a Minor League Baseball team of the California League and the Single-A affiliate of the Arizona Diamondbacks. They are located in Visalia, California, and have played their home games at Valley Strong Ballpark since their inception in 1946.

The team has had nine names, most of which reflected its changing major-league affiliates, most recently the Minnesota Twins, Colorado Rockies, Oakland A's, Tampa Bay Rays, and Diamondbacks. They took the name Rawhide in 2009.

In conjunction with Major League Baseball's restructuring of Minor League Baseball in 2021, the Rawhide were organized into the Low-A West at the Low-A classification. In 2022, the Low-A West became known as the California League, the name historically used by the regional circuit prior to the 2021 reorganization, and was reclassified as a Single-A circuit.

== Casey Jones/Casey at the Bat ==
Once per season, the team wears old-fashioned uniforms recalling Mighty Casey, the main folklore hero of "Casey at the Bat" and the "Mudville Nine", based on the Stockton Ports in Stockton.

Visalia is one of the four oldest cities of the Cal League, along with San Jose (the San Jose Giants/Bees); and Modesto (the Modesto Nuts/A's).

== Mascot ==
The Visalia Rawhide mascot is a Holstein Bull named Tipper, introduced on October 15, 2008. Tipper represents the tens of thousands of Holsteins in Tulare County, the top dairy-producing area in the country. Tipper's home is a ballpark barn – a 40' x 20' red barn which is part of the outfield fence – doubles carom off the side of the barn, and home runs land on the roof, leading to a new twist on the old baseball adage "couldn't hit the broad side of the barn" which now represents weak hitters instead of wild pitchers. The traditional red barn was built as a "community barn raising" to raise awareness for Habitat for Humanity and stands as an icon for the agricultural heritage of the valley.

== Radio broadcast ==
The Rawhide are heard terrestrially on KJUG AM 1270 and over the internet through their website www.rawhidebaseball.com.

== Notable Visalia alumni ==
Baseball Hall of Fame alumni

- Randy Johnson (2007) Inducted, 2015
- Kirby Puckett (1983) Inducted, 2001

Notable alumni

- Jack Aker (1960)
- Allan Anderson (1984) 1988 AL ERA Leader
- Trevor Bauer (2011)
- Ken Berry (1962) MLB All-Star
- Jay Bell (1985) 2x MLB All-Star
- Geoff Blum (2011)
- Eric Byrnes (1998, 2008)
- Marty Cordova (1991–1992) 1995 AL Rookie of the Year
- John Castino (1977) 1979 AL Rookie of the Year
- Joe Charboneau (1978) 1980 AL Rookie of the Year
- Eric Chavez (1995)
- Craig Counsell (1993)
- Vic Davalillo (1958) MLB All-Star
- Zach Duke (2011)
- Adam Eaton (2011, 2013)
- Johnny Edwards (1959) 3x MLB All-Star
- Scott Erickson (1989) MLB All-Star
- Tim Foli (1969)
- Paul Goldschmidt (2010) 2013 NL Home Run & RBI Leader; 5x MLB All-Star
- Tom Gordon (2008) 3x MLB All-Star
- Kevin Gregg (1997)
- Eddie Guardado (1992) 2x MLB All-Star
- Mark Guthrie (1987)
- Ken Harrelson (1961) MLB All-Star
- Kent Hrbek (1981) MLB All-Star
- Aubrey Huff (2006)
- Ubaldo Jiménez (2004) MLB All-Star
- Jake Lamb (2013) MLB All-Star
- Chuck Knoblauch (1989) 4x MLB All-Star; 1991 AL Rookie of the Year
- Tom Kelly (1979–1980, MGR) 1991 AL Manager of the Year; Manager: 2 x World Series Champion – Minnesota Twins (1987, 1991)
- Evan Longoria (2006) 3x MLB All Star; 2008 AL Rookie of the Year
- Lee Mazzilli (1975) MLB All-Star
- John Milner (1969)
- Jerry Morales (1968) MLB All-Star
- Denny Neagle (1990, 2003) 2x MLB All-Star
- Fernando Perez
- Vada Pinson (1957) 4x MLB All-Star
- A.J. Pollock (2016) MLB All-Star
- Mark Portugal (1983)
- Max Scherzer (2007) 5x MLB All-Star; 2 x Cy Young Award (2013 AL, 2016 NL)
- José Santiago (1962) MLB All-Star
- Ken Singleton (1968) 3x MLB All-Star
- Nick Swisher (2002) MLB All-Star
- Juan Uribe (2003)
- Justin Upton (2007, 2009) 4x MLB All-Star
- Barry Zito (1999) 3x MLB All-Star; 2002 AL Cy Young Award

== Pop culture ==
As a minor league affiliate of the Oakland A's at the time, the Visalia Oaks were prominently mentioned in the Michael Lewis Book 'Moneyball', and also featured a few times during the 2011 movie Moneyball (which took place in 2002). In one scene, Billy Beane is driving to see the Visalia Oaks during the A's winning streak, and another shows Billy watching video of Visalia Oaks catcher Jeremy Brown tripping and then diving back to first on a ball that turned out to be a home run.

In the 1988 film Bull Durham, Visalia was mentioned as a potential managing job for aging catcher Crash Davis, played by Kevin Costner.

In the 1994 film Little Big League, a Visalia Oaks pennant can be seen hanging on the wall in the main character’s bedroom.

== Roster ==
Visalia Rawhide roster
Players	Coaches/Other
Pitchers: 33 Anderson Cardenas; 5 Junior Ciprian; 37 Jairon Digon; 19 Jesus Escobar; 36 Mervin Fell; 16 Connor Foley; 11 Raul Garayzar; 30 Samuel Gonzalez; 39 Simon Gregersen; 29 Julian Hernandez; 6 Chung-Hsiang Huang; 15 Alexis Liebano; 14 Dean Livingston; 33 Walvin Mena; 34 Augie Mojica; 31 Daniel Nunez; 18 Wilkin Paredes; 14 Erick Reynoso; 38 Ricardo Yan; Catchers: -- Juan Centeno ~; 3 Adrian De Leon; 24 Ivan Luciano; 20 Alejandro Rios; Infielders: 4 Eliesbert Alejos; 10 Tytus Cissell; 9 Abdias De La Cruz; 8 Yerald Nin; 21 Enyervert Perez; 9 Adrian Rodriguez; Outfielders: 35 Jose Alpuria; 22 Pedro Blanco; 23 Pedro Catuy; -- Nathan Hall; 17 Bo Walker	Manager: 2 Dee Garner; Coaches: 12 Jancarlos Cintron (hitting); 26 Rolando Garza (pitching); 40 Mickey Jiang (bench); 60-day injured list: -- Joe Ariola; -- Ryan Bruno; 34 Alex Galvan; 38 Jaitoine Kelly; -- Hayden Murphy; -- Collin Rothermel (full season); -- Josdanner Suarez (full season); -- Deyer Zapata (full season); 7-day injured list; * On Arizona Diamondbacks 40-man roster; ~ Development list; # Rehab assignment; ∞ Reserve list; ‡ Restricted list; § Suspended list; † Temporarily inactive list; Roster updated July 1, 2026; Transactions; → More rosters: MiLB • California League; → Arizona Diamondbacks minor league players

== Alumni ==
- Visalia Oaks
- Central Valley Rockies
- Visalia Mets
- Visalia Redlegs

== Minor league affiliations ==
Level	Team	League	Location	Manager
Triple-A	Reno Aces	Pacific Coast League	Reno, Nevada	Blake Lalli
Double-A	Amarillo Sod Poodles	Texas League	Amarillo, Texas	Shawn Roof
High-A	Hillsboro Hops	Northwest League	Hillsboro, Oregon	Vince Harrison
Single-A	Visalia Rawhide	California League	Visalia, California	Dee Garner
Rookie	ACL D-backs	Arizona Complex League	Scottsdale, Arizona	Rolando Arnedo
Rookie	DSL D-backs 1	Dominican Summer League	Boca Chica, Santo Domingo	Jaime Del Valle
Rookie	DSL D-backs 2	Dominican Summer League	Boca Chica, Santo Domingo	Ronald Ramirez
