= Freestyle skiing at the 2015 Winter Universiade – Men's ski slopestyle =

The men's ski slopestyle competition of the 2015 Winter Universiade was held at Sulayr Snowpark, Sierra Nevada, Spain on February 9, 2015.

== Results ==
=== Qualification ===
Rank	Bib	Name	Country	Run 1	Rank	Run 2	Rank	Best	Notes
1	22	Fabian Braitsch	Austria	71.66	5	82	1	82	Q
2	23	Josef Kalenský	Czech Republic	72.16	3	80.16	2	80.16	Q
3	33	Bartłomiej Sibiga	Poland	71.83	4	80	3	80	Q
4	46	Alexander Benz	Switzerland	77.33	1	65.33	8	77.33	Q
5	21	Dominic Hasibeder	Austria	52.33	14	73.66	4	76.33	Q
6	58	Szczepan Karpiel	Poland	72.33	2	62.16	11	72.33	Q
7	40	Arkadii Kazakov	Russia	66.83	7	70.5	5	70.5	Q
8	47	Cody Potter	United States	70.33	6	62.83	10	70.33	Q
9	55	Broby Leeds	United States	60	9	68.83	6	68.83	Q
10	57	Lovrenc Kolenc	Slovenia	13	22	66	7	66	Q
11	45	Silvan Jäger	Switzerland	62	8	65	9	65	Q
12	56	John Leonard	United States	36	17	60.83	12	60.83	Q
13	34	Paweł Palichleb	Poland	34.5	18	60.33	13	60.33	
14	24	Jarkko Ronkainen	Finland	58.5	10	24.66	22	58.5	
15	38	Dmitri Mulendeev	Russia	55.5	11	32.66	21	55.5	
16	25	Henri Koskelainen	Finland	24.33	20	54.66	14	54.66	
17	41	Igor Janckulík	Slovakia	53.33	12	53.16	15	53.33	
18	29	Michael Mairamtinkhof	Italy	52.66	13	53	16	53	
19	48	Jeremy Brown	United States	42.33	16	50.5	17	50.5	
20	39	Petr Kordyuk	Russia	46.83	15	49.16	18	49.16	
21	36	Cheon Ho-Young	South Korea	6	27	45.33	19	45.33	
22	59	Mamuka Khutsishvili	Georgia	4	28	43	20	43	
23	42	Žiga Kovačič	Slovenia	28.33	19	10	27	28.33	
24	31	Andrea Conci	Italy	22.16	21	9.66	28	22.16	
25	26	Guram Vashakmadze	Georgia	10	25	14.66	23	14.66	
26	37	Dmitry Makarov	Russia	10.66	24	14.33	24	14.33	
27	27	Sandro Chopikashvili	Georgia	12	23	14	25	14	
28	43	Jorge Montoya	Spain	8	26	11.33	26	11.33	
	30	Ruggero Rosi	Italy						DNS

=== Finals ===
Rank	Bib	Name	Country	Run 1	Rank	Run 2	Rank	Best	Notes
1st place, gold medalist(s)	22	Fabian Braitsch	Austria	81.83	1	72.16	4	81.83	
2nd place, silver medalist(s)	55	Broby Leeds	United States	78	2	11.66	11	78	
3rd place, bronze medalist(s)	47	Cody Potter	United States	75.33	3	74.16	1	75.33	
4	40	Arkadii Kazakov	Russia	29.33	10	73.66	2	73.66	
5	33	Bartłomiej Sibiga	Poland	68.33	6	73.16	3	73.16	
6	46	Alexander Benz	Switzerland	70.5	4	56.83	9	70.5	
7	23	Josef Kalenský	Czech Republic	67.5	8	69.16	5	69.16	
8	58	Szczepan Karpiel	Poland	69	5	63	7	69	
9	45	Silvan Jäger	Switzerland	68	7	65.83	6	65.83	
10	56	John Leonard	United States	65.5	9	62.16	8	65.5	
11	57	Lovrenc Kolenc	Slovenia	28.16	11	DNS		28.16	
12	21	Dominic Hasibeder	Austria	12.33	12	18.5	10	18.5	
