= Conor Burke =

Conor Burke may refer to:

- Conor Burke (rugby union), (born 1974), Irish rugby union player
- Conor Burke (hurler), (born 1998) is an Irish hurler
- Conor Burke (baseball), or Conor O. Burke, American baseball coach and former outfielder
