= 1999 Alabama Crimson Tide baseball team =

American college baseball season

1999 Alabama Crimson Tide baseball

SEC tournament champions Tuscaloosa Regional champions Tuscaloosa Super Regional champions

College World Series, 4th
- Conference: Southeastern Conference
- Western
- Record: 53–16 (21–9 SEC)
- Head coach: Jim Wells (5th season)
- Assistant coach: Mitch Gaspard (5th season)
- Hitting coach: Todd Butler (5th season)
- Home stadium: Sewell–Thomas Stadium

1999 Southeastern Conference baseball standings
	Conf.				Overall
Team	W		L	PCT	W		L	PCT
Eastern Division
South Carolina ^{x}‍‍‍	15	–	15	.500	35	–	23	.603
Kentucky ‍‍‍	13	–	17	.433	25	–	32	.439
Florida ‍‍‍	13	–	17	.433	31	–	25	.554
Tennessee ‍‍‍	10	–	20	.333	28	–	28	.500
Georgia ‍‍‍	8	–	20	.286	25	–	30	.455
Vanderbilt ‍‍‍	8	–	22	.267	22	–	33	.400
Western Division
No. 17 Arkansas ^{x}‍†‍‍^{y}	22	–	8	.733	42	–	23	.646
No. 4 Alabama ‍‍‡‍^{y}	21	–	9	.700	53	–	16	.768
No. 14 LSU ‍‍‍^{y}	18	–	11	.621	41	–	24	.631
No. 15 Auburn ‍‍‍^{y}	18	–	12	.600	46	–	19	.708
Ole Miss ‍‍‍^{y}	17	–	13	.567	34	–	28	.548
No. 30 Mississippi State ‍‍‍^{y}	15	–	14	.517	42	–	21	.667
x – Division champion † – Conference champion ‡ – Tournament champion y – Invited to the NCAA tournament As of June 30, 1999; Rankings from Collegiate Baseball

The 1999 Alabama Crimson Tide baseball team is a baseball team that represented the University of Alabama in the 1999 NCAA Division I baseball season. The Crimson Tide were members of the Southeastern Conference and played their home games at Sewell–Thomas Stadium in Tuscaloosa, Alabama. They were led by fifth-year head coach Jim Wells.

== Roster ==
1999 Alabama Crimson Tide baseball team
Players
Coaches

#	Pos.	Name	B/T	Height	Weight	Year	Home town
	LHP	Jonathan Blankenship	L/L	5 ft 10 in (1.78 m)	180 lb (82 kg)	So	Decatur, Alabama
	OF	Antonio Bostic	/	—	—
	INF	Brent Boyd	/	—	—	Fr
	INF	Sam Bozanich	R/R	5 ft 9 in (1.75 m)	190 lb (86 kg)	So	Bakersfield, California
	INF	Jeremy Brown	R/R	5 ft 10 in (1.78 m)	226 lb (103 kg)	Fr	Birmingham, Alabama
	RHP	Lance Cormier	R/R	6 ft 1 in (1.85 m)	200 lb (91 kg)	Fr	Lafayette, Louisiana
	P	B. J. Green	/	—	—
	C	Kelley Gulledge	R/R	6 ft 1 in (1.85 m)	215 lb (98 kg)	So	Arlington, Texas
	OF	G. W. Keller	R/R	5 ft 10 in (1.78 m)	170 lb (77 kg)	Jr	Salt Lake City, Utah
	OF	Scott McClanahan	R/R	6 ft 3 in (1.91 m)	220 lb (100 kg)	Fr	Decatur, Alabama
	P	Jason Moates	/	—	—
	P	Scott Murphy	/	—	—
	INF	Andy Phillips	R/R	6 ft 0 in (1.83 m)	205 lb (93 kg)	Fr	Tuscaloosa, Alabama
	LHP	Justin Smith	L/L	5 ft 11 in (1.8 m)	195 lb (88 kg)		Elk City, Oklahoma
	RHP	Manny Torres	/R	—	—	Fr
40	RHP	Jeremy Vaughn	R/R	6 ft 3 in (1.91 m)	—	Fr	Cantonment, Florida
	OF	Derek Wigginton	L/L	6 ft 1 in (1.85 m)	210 lb (95 kg)	So	Nashville, Tennessee

Head coach

Jim Wells

Assistant coach(es)

Todd Butler
Mitch Gaspard

Legend

- (C) Team captain
- (S) Suspended
- (I) Ineligible
- Injured
- Current redshirt

== Schedule ==
1999 Alabama Crimson Tide baseball game log: 53–16
Regular season: 42–14
February (8–4)

#	Date	Opponent	Rank	Site/stadium	Score	Overall record	SEC record
1	February 12	at Houston	No. 10	Schroeder Park • Houston, Texas	W 5–1	1–0	–
2	February 13	at Houston	No. 10	Schroeder Park • Houston, Texas	L 5–9	1–1	–
3	February 14	at Houston	No. 10	Schroeder Park • Houston, Texas	L 2–6	1–2	–
4	February 18	Samford	No. 18	Sewell–Thomas Stadium • Tuscaloosa, Alabama	W 3–1	2–2	–
5	February 19	Arkansas State	No. 18	Sewell–Thomas Stadium • Tuscaloosa, Alabama	W 3–2	3–2	–
6	February 20	Arkansas State	No. 18	Sewell–Thomas Stadium • Tuscaloosa, Alabama	L 4–8	3–3	–
7	February 21	Arkansas State	No. 18	Sewell–Thomas Stadium • Tuscaloosa, Alabama	W 13–5	4–3	–
8	February 24	Troy	No. 22	Sewell–Thomas Stadium • Tuscaloosa, Alabama	W 4–2	5–3	–
9	February 24	Troy	No. 22	Sewell–Thomas Stadium • Tuscaloosa, Alabama	W 5–4	6–3	–
10	February 26	No. 10 Cal State Fullerton	No. 22	Sewell–Thomas Stadium • Tuscaloosa, Alabama	L 2–5	6–4	–
11	February 27	No. 10 Cal State Fullerton	No. 22	Sewell–Thomas Stadium • Tuscaloosa, Alabama	W 5–4	7–4	–
12	February 28	No. 10 Cal State Fullerton	No. 22	Sewell–Thomas Stadium • Tuscaloosa, Alabama	W 7–6	8–4	–

March (15–4)

#	Date	Opponent	Rank	Site/stadium	Score	Overall record	SEC record
13	March 2	Austin Peay	No. 15	Sewell–Thomas Stadium • Tuscaloosa, Alabama	W 6–3	9–4	–
14	March 5	Niagara	No. 15	Sewell–Thomas Stadium • Tuscaloosa, Alabama	W 14–3	10–4	–
15	March 6	Niagara	No. 15	Sewell–Thomas Stadium • Tuscaloosa, Alabama	W 19–2	11–4	–
16	March 7	Niagara	No. 15	Sewell–Thomas Stadium • Tuscaloosa, Alabama	W 27–0	12–4	–
17	March 9	Southern Miss	No. 14	Sewell–Thomas Stadium • Tuscaloosa, Alabama	W 5–3	13–4	–
18	March 12	at Tennessee	No. 14	Lindsey Nelson Stadium • Knoxville, Tennessee	W 12–7	14–4	1–0
19	March 14	at Tennessee	No. 14	Lindsey Nelson Stadium • Knoxville, Tennessee	W 12–5	15–4	2–0
20	March 14	at Tennessee	No. 14	Lindsey Nelson Stadium • Knoxville, Tennessee	L 9–21	15–5	2–1
21	March 16	West Alabama	No. 15	Sewell–Thomas Stadium • Tuscaloosa, Alabama	W 4–2	16–5	–
22	March 19	Georgia	No. 15	Sewell–Thomas Stadium • Tuscaloosa, Alabama	W 8–2	17–5	3–1
23	March 20	Georgia	No. 15	Sewell–Thomas Stadium • Tuscaloosa, Alabama	W 4–2	18–5	4–1
24	March 21	Georgia	No. 15	Sewell–Thomas Stadium • Tuscaloosa, Alabama	W 9–8	19–5	5–1
25	March 23	Kansas State	No. 12	Sewell–Thomas Stadium • Tuscaloosa, Alabama	W 27–5	20–5	–
26	March 24	Kansas State	No. 12	Sewell–Thomas Stadium • Tuscaloosa, Alabama	W 9–8	21–5	–
27	March 26	at No. 2 Auburn	No. 12	Plainsman Park • Auburn, Alabama	L 4–15	21–6	5–2
28	March 27	at No. 2 Auburn	No. 12	Plainsman Park • Auburn, Alabama	L 2–10	21–7	5–3
29	March 28	at No. 2 Auburn	No. 12	Plainsman Park • Auburn, Alabama	W 10–4	22–7	6–3
30	March 30	at Jacksonville State	No. 15	Rudy Abbott Field • Jacksonville, Alabama	L 3–5	22–8	–
31	March 31	Jacksonville State	No. 15	Sewell–Thomas Stadium • Tuscaloosa, Alabama	W 3–0	23–8	–

April (12–5)

#	Date	Opponent	Rank	Site/stadium	Score	Overall record	SEC record
32	April 2	No. 26 South Carolina	No. 15	Sewell–Thomas Stadium • Tuscaloosa, Alabama	W 13–8	24–8	7–3
33	April 3	No. 26 South Carolina	No. 15	Sewell–Thomas Stadium • Tuscaloosa, Alabama	W 14–5	25–8	8–3
34	April 4	No. 26 South Carolina	No. 15	Sewell–Thomas Stadium • Tuscaloosa, Alabama	L 4–12	25–9	8–4
35	April 7	Northwestern State	No. 16	Sewell–Thomas Stadium • Tuscaloosa, Alabama	W 8–6	26–9	–
36	April 9	at No. 7 Mississippi State	No. 16	Dudy Noble Field, Polk–DeMent Stadium • Starkville, Mississippi	W 6–4	27–9	9–4
37	April 10	at No. 7 Mississippi State	No. 16	Dudy Noble Field, Polk–DeMent Stadium • Starkville, Mississippi	L 4–5	27–10	9–5
38	April 11	at No. 7 Mississippi State	No. 18	Dudy Noble Field, Polk–DeMent Stadium • Starkville, Mississippi	L 9–10	27–11	9–6
39	April 14	at UAB	No. 18	Jerry D. Young Memorial Field • Birmingham, Alabama	W 30–4	28–11	9–6
40	April 16	LSU	No. 18	Sewell–Thomas Stadium • Tuscaloosa, Alabama	W 10–3	29–11	10–6
41	April 17	LSU	No. 18	Sewell–Thomas Stadium • Tuscaloosa, Alabama	L 8–9	29–12	10–7
42	April 18	LSU	No. 18	Sewell–Thomas Stadium • Tuscaloosa, Alabama	W 9–4	30–12	11–7
43	April 20	South Alabama	No. 18	Sewell–Thomas Stadium • Tuscaloosa, Alabama	W 7–6	31–12	–
44	April 23	No. 10 Arkansas	No. 18	Sewell–Thomas Stadium • Tuscaloosa, Alabama	W 8–3	32–12	12–7
45	April 24	No. 10 Arkansas	No. 18	Sewell–Thomas Stadium • Tuscaloosa, Alabama	W 15–8	33–12	13–7
46	April 25	No. 10 Arkansas	No. 18	Sewell–Thomas Stadium • Tuscaloosa, Alabama	W 9–8	34–12	14–7
47	April 28	UAB	No. 12	Sewell–Thomas Stadium • Tuscaloosa, Alabama	W 22–5	35–12	–
48	April 30	at No. 26 Ole Miss	No. 12	Swayze Field • Oxford, Mississippi	L 2–6	35–13	14–8

May (7–1)

#	Date	Opponent	Rank	Site/stadium	Score	Overall record	SEC record
49	May 1	at No. 26 Ole Miss	No. 12	Swayze Field • Oxford, Mississippi	W 8–4	36–13	15–8
50	May 2	at No. 26 Ole Miss	No. 12	Swayze Field • Oxford, Mississippi	L 3–10	36–14	15–9
51	May 7	Vanderbilt	No. 12	Sewell–Thomas Stadium • Tuscaloosa, Alabama	W 3–2	37–14	16–9
52	May 8	Vanderbilt	No. 12	Sewell–Thomas Stadium • Tuscaloosa, Alabama	W 22–13	38–14	17–9
53	May 9	Vanderbilt	No. 12	Sewell–Thomas Stadium • Tuscaloosa, Alabama	W 14–5	39–14	18–9
54	May 14	at Florida	No. 12	Alfred A. McKethan Stadium • Gainesville, Florida	W 12–10	40–14	19–9
55	May 15	at Florida	No. 12	Alfred A. McKethan Stadium • Gainesville, Florida	W 4–3	41–14	20–9
56	May 16	at Florida	No. 12	Alfred A. McKethan Stadium • Gainesville, Florida	W 11–8	42–14	21–9

Postseason: 11–2
SEC Tournament (4–0)

#	Date	Opponent	Seed/Rank	Site/stadium	Score	Overall record	SECT record
57	May 19	vs. (7) Ole Miss	(2) No. 10	Hoover Metropolitan Stadium • Hoover, Alabama	W 7–6	43–14	1–0
58	May 20	vs. (6) Mississippi State	(2) No. 10	Hoover Metropolitan Stadium • Hoover, Alabama	W 4–3	44–14	2–0
59	May 22	vs. (6) Mississippi State	(2) No. 10	Hoover Metropolitan Stadium • Hoover, Alabama	W 12–11	45–14	3–0
60	May 23	vs. (4) No. 8 Arkansas	(2) No. 10	Hoover Metropolitan Stadium • Hoover, Alabama	W 9–3	46–14	4–0

Tuscaloosa Regional (3–0)

#	Date	Opponent	Seed/Rank	Site/stadium	Score	Overall record	NCAAT record
61	May 28	(4) Navy	(1) No. 9	Sewell–Thomas Stadium • Tuscaloosa, Alabama	W 16–3	47–14	1–0
62	May 29	(3) Southern Miss	(1) No. 9	Sewell–Thomas Stadium • Tuscaloosa, Alabama	W 10–4	48–14	2–0
63	May 30	(3) Southern Miss	(1) No. 9	Sewell–Thomas Stadium • Tuscaloosa, Alabama	W 7–6	49–14	3–0

Tuscaloosa Super Regional (2–0)

#	Date	Opponent	Seed/Rank	Site/stadium	Score	Overall record	NCAAT record
64	June 4	No. 13 LSU	(5) No. 7	Sewell–Thomas Stadium • Tuscaloosa, Alabama	W 13–6	50–14	4–0
65	June 5	No. 13 LSU	(5) No. 7	Sewell–Thomas Stadium • Tuscaloosa, Alabama	W 13–5	51–14	5–0

1999 College World Series (2–2)

#	Date	Opponent	Seed/Rank	Site/stadium	Score	Overall record	CWS record
66	June 11	vs. No. 8 Oklahoma State	(5) No. 7	Johnny Rosenblatt Stadium • Omaha, Nebraska	W 11–3	52–14	1–0
67	June 13	vs. (1) No. 1 Miami (FL)	(5) No. 7	Johnny Rosenblatt Stadium • Omaha, Nebraska	L 1–8	52–15	1–1
68	June 16	vs. (8) No. 2 Rice	(5) No. 7	Johnny Rosenblatt Stadium • Omaha, Nebraska	W 6–5	53–15	2–1
69	June 17	vs. (1) No. 1 Miami (FL)	(5) No. 7	Johnny Rosenblatt Stadium • Omaha, Nebraska	L 2–5	53–16	2–2

== Awards and honors ==
Antonio Bostic

- Tuscaloosa Regional All-Tournament Team

Sam Bozanich

- Tuscaloosa Regional All-Tournament Team

Jeremy Brown

- SEC All-Tournament Team
- BA Freshman All-American Second Team
- CB Freshman All-American Second Team

Lance Cormier

- CB Freshman All-American First Team
- BW Freshman All-American First Team

Kelley Gulledge

- SEC All-Tournament Team
- Tuscaloosa Regional All-Tournament Team

G. W. Keller

- ABCA All-South Region Team
- First Team All-SEC
- SEC All-Tournament Team
- College World Series All-Tournament Team

Andy Phillips

- ABCA All-South Region Team
- First Team All-SEC
- Tuscaloosa Regional All-Tournament Team
- Tuscaloosa Regional MVP
- NCBWA District III Player of the Year
- Dick Howser Trophy Finalist
- First Team All-American

Manny Torres

- ABCA All-South Region Team
- Second Team All-SEC
