= Brian Hamm =

American baseball coach

Current position
- Title: Fay Vincent '31 Head Coach of Baseball
- Team: Yale
- Conference: Ivy League
- Record: 96–75–1 (.561)

Biographical details
- Born: Terryville, Connecticut, U.S.
- Education: BA - Middlebury College (VT) MA Sport Management - UMass Isenberg School of Mgmt

Playing career

Soccer
- 1998–2001: Middlebury

Baseball
- 1999–2002: Middlebury
- Positions: Goalkeeper, Shortstop

Coaching career (HC unless noted)
- 2003–2005: Middlebury (Asst)
- 2006–2009: Amherst (Asst)
- 2010–2018: Amherst
- 2019–2022: Eastern Connecticut State
- 2023–present: Yale

Head coaching record
- Overall: 425–218–1 (.661)
- Tournaments: NCAA D1: 0–3 (.000); NCAA D3: 15–10 (.600)

Accomplishments and honors

Championships
- 2 NESCAC (2013, 2018); 2 Little East (2021, 2022); 2 Ivy League (2025, 2026); Ivy League tournament (2026); NCAA Division III National (2022)

Awards
- Skip Bertman Award - National Coach of the Year - 2022 ABCA/ATEC National Coach of the Year Division III - 2022 D3baseball.com National Coach of the Year - 2022 D3baseball.com New England Regional Coach of the Year - 2021, 2022 Ivy League Coach of the Year - 2025 LEC Coach of the Year - 2021, 2022 NESCAC Coach of the Year - 2011, 2018

Brian Hamm is a baseball coach and former shortstop, who is the current head baseball coach of the Yale Bulldogs. He played college soccer and college baseball at Middlebury College from 1998 to 2002. He then served as the head baseball coach of the Amherst Mammoths (2010–2018) and the Eastern Connecticut State Warriors (2019–2022). He led the Warriors to an NCAA Division III National Championship in 2022.

== Playing career ==
During his college years, Hamm excelled in both soccer and baseball as a student-athlete for the Middlebury Panthers. He played as the starting shortstop for four years on the baseball team and served as a three-year starting goalkeeper for the soccer team. His exceptional performance in soccer led him to earn all-conference and all-region honors twice. Throughout his tenure, Hamm exhibited strong leadership qualities, captaining both teams during his senior year. In recognition of his athletic achievements, academic scholarship, and leadership skills, he was presented with the John P. Stabile Memorial Award during his senior year.

== Coaching career ==
Following his graduation from Middlebury in 2002, he worked as an assistant coach for the soccer and baseball teams for three years while also serving as a college admissions counselor for Middlebury. In 2005, he took a position as an assistant coach under Bill Thurston, a renowned Hall-of-Fame coach, at Amherst College for four years. Between 2007 and 2009, he also served as an Envoy Coach for Major League Baseball International, where he worked with both amateur and professional teams in Europe. For his exceptional coaching and player development in international baseball, he was awarded the MLB Julio Puente Envoy Coach Award in 2009, making him the youngest coach to have ever received this award.

Starting in 2009, he became the head coach for the Amherst College baseball program and stayed there until 2018. While serving as head coach, Hamm oversaw the most successful era in Amherst baseball's 162-year history, with a record of 221–113 (.662). His leadership led the team to four NCAA Division III tournaments and two NESCAC tournament championships (2013 and 2018). Furthermore, his .725 winning percentage in NESCAC regular-season play is the highest ever recorded in the conference's history. He earned the title of NESCAC Coach of the Year in both 2011 and 2018. During his tenure at Amherst, Hamm produced more MLB draftees (four) than any other Division III head coach, and his teams also had the most players selected for the NESCAC All-Academic Team among all NESCAC baseball teams.

After departing from Amherst College, he became the head baseball coach at Eastern Connecticut State University for four seasons, from 2019 to 2022. During his tenure, he led the Warriors to two consecutive NCAA Tournaments in 2021 and 2022 and won an NCAA Division III National Championship in 2022. Hamm's leadership resulted in an overall record of 108–30 (.783) and a Little East Conference record of 38–10 (.792) for ECSU. The Warriors claimed the LEC Regular Season Championship in both 2021 and 2022 with a record of 15–1 each year, establishing the LEC record for most regular-season conference wins. Hamm was recognized with the LEC Coach of the Year Award two years consecutively (2021 and 2022).

In 2022, the Warriors earned the program's first national championship in 20 years, culminating in a season where they went 49–3. Hamm's leadership helped ECSU break the school record for wins with 49, which is tied for the second-most ever by a DIII National Champion. The team also tied the school record with a 23-game winning streak to end the year. Hamm's impressive work during the 2022 season earned him the Skip Bertman Award as National Coach of the Year from the College Baseball Foundation. He was also named D3baseball.com National Coach of the Year and ABCA/ATEC National Coach of the Year for the Division III level. Hamm became the coach of the Yale Bulldogs in 2022.

== Awards ==
Skip Bertman Award - National Coach of the Year - 2022

ABCA/ATEC National Coach of the Year Division III - 2022

D3baseball.com National Coach of the Year - 2022

D3baseball.com New England Regional Coach of the Year - 2021, 2022

Ivy League Coach of the Year - 2025

LEC Coach of the Year - 2021, 2022

NESCAC Coach of the Year - 2011, 2018

== Head coaching record ==
Record table
Season	Team	Overall	Conference	Standing	Postseason
Amherst Mammoths (New England Small College Athletic Conference) (2010–2018)
2010	Amherst	21–11	7–5	T-2nd (West)	
2011	Amherst	25–10	10–2	1st (West)	
2012	Amherst	23–10	10–2	1st (West)	
2013	Amherst	27–13	9–3	T-1st (West)	NCAA Regional
2014	Amherst	30–11	9–3	2nd (West)	NCAA Regional
2015	Amherst	27–15	9–3	2nd (West)	NCAA Regional
2016	Amherst	24–13	7–5	T-1st (West)	
2017	Amherst	20–16	8–4	T-1st (West)	
2018	Amherst	24–14	8–4	T-1st (West)	NCAA Regional
Amherst:		221–113 (.662)	77–31 (.713)		
Eastern Connecticut State Warriors (Little East Conference) (2019–2022)
2019	Eastern Connecticut State	23–18	8–8	T-4th	
2020	Eastern Connecticut State	4–1			Season canceled due to COVID-19
2021	Eastern Connecticut State	32–8	15–1	1st	NCAA Regional
2022	Eastern Connecticut State	49–3	15–1	1st	NCAA Champions
Eastern Connecticut State:		108–30 (.783)	38–10 (.792)		
Yale Bulldogs (Ivy League) (2023–present)
2023	Yale	17–23	10–11	5th	
2024	Yale	18–23	11–10	4th	
2025	Yale	31–14	16–5	T–1st	
2026	Yale	30–15–1	14–6–1	1st	NCAA Regional
Yale:		96–75–1 (.561)	51–32–1 (.613)		
Total:		425–218–1 (.661)			
National champion Postseason invitational champion Conference regular season champion Conference regular season and conference tournament champion Division regular season champion Division regular season and conference tournament champion Conference tournament champion
