= 1999 Southeastern Conference baseball tournament =

- Teams: 8
- Format: Two pools of four-team double elimination
- Finals site: Hoover Metropolitan Stadium; Hoover, Alabama
- Champions: Alabama (5th title)
- Winning coach: Jim Wells (4th title)
- MVP: G.W. Keller (Alabama)
- Attendance: 98,873

1999 Southeastern Conference baseball standings
	Conf.				Overall
Team	W		L	PCT	W		L	PCT
Eastern Division
South Carolina ^{x}‍‍‍	15	–	15	.500	35	–	23	.603
Kentucky ‍‍‍	13	–	17	.433	25	–	32	.439
Florida ‍‍‍	13	–	17	.433	31	–	25	.554
Tennessee ‍‍‍	10	–	20	.333	28	–	28	.500
Georgia ‍‍‍	8	–	20	.286	25	–	30	.455
Vanderbilt ‍‍‍	8	–	22	.267	22	–	33	.400
Western Division
No. 17 Arkansas ^{x}‍†‍‍^{y}	22	–	8	.733	42	–	23	.646
No. 4 Alabama ‍‍‡‍^{y}	21	–	9	.700	53	–	16	.768
No. 14 LSU ‍‍‍^{y}	18	–	11	.621	41	–	24	.631
No. 15 Auburn ‍‍‍^{y}	18	–	12	.600	46	–	19	.708
Ole Miss ‍‍‍^{y}	17	–	13	.567	34	–	28	.548
No. 30 Mississippi State ‍‍‍^{y}	15	–	14	.517	42	–	21	.667
x – Division champion † – Conference champion ‡ – Tournament champion y – Invited to the NCAA tournament As of June 30, 1999; Rankings from Collegiate Baseball

The 1999 Southeastern Conference baseball tournament was held at Hoover Metropolitan Stadium in Hoover, Alabama from May 19 through 23. Alabama defeated Arkansas in the championship game, earning the Southeastern Conference's automatic bid to the 1999 NCAA Division I baseball tournament.

== Regular season results ==
The top four teams (based on conference results) from both the Eastern and Western divisions earned invites to the tournament.

== Tournament ==
First round
6	Ole Miss	6
3	Alabama	7
7	Mississippi State	7
2	South Carolina	5
6	Ole Miss	2
2	South Carolina	0
5	Auburn	6
4	LSU	2
8	Kentucky	4
1	Arkansas	6
4	LSU	10
8	Kentucky	0

Second round
3	Alabama	4
7	Mississippi State	3
7	Mississippi State	2
6	Ole Miss	0
5	Auburn	3
1	Arkansas	2
1	Arkansas	9
4	LSU	8

Semifinals
3	Alabama	12	-
7	Mississippi State	11	-
5	Auburn	5	6
1	Arkansas	9	9

Final
3	Alabama	9
1	Arkansas	3

- Florida, Georgia, Tennessee, and Vanderbilt did not make the tournament.

== All-tournament team ==
Most valuable player G.W. Keller, Alabama

Position	Player	School
1B	Jeremy Brown	Alabama
2B	Mark Burnett	Arkansas
3B	Rodney Nye	Arkansas
SS	Joe Jester	Arkansas
C	Kelley Gulledge	Alabama
OF	Mailon Kent	Auburn
OF	G.W. Keller	Alabama
OF	Jamie Rock	Mississippi State
DH	Travis Chapman	Mississippi State
P	Tanner Brock	Mississippi State
P	Dan McShea	Ole Miss
MVP	G.W. Keller	Alabama

== See also ==
- College World Series
- NCAA Division I Baseball Championship
- Southeastern Conference baseball tournament
