= 2026 Ivy League baseball tournament =

- Teams: 4
- Format: Double elimination
- Finals site: George H. W. Bush Field; New Haven, CT
- Champions: Yale (5th title)
- Winning coach: Brian Hamm (1st title)
- MVP: Jack Ohman (Yale)
- Television: ESPN+

2026 Ivy League baseball standings
| | Conf. | | | | | | Overall |
| Team | W | | L | | T | PCT | W | | L | | T | PCT |
|---|---|---|---|---|---|---|---|---|---|---|---|---|
| Yale ‍†‍‡‍^{y} | 14 | – | 6 | – | 1 | .690 | 30 | – | 13 | – | 1 | .693 |
| Penn ‍‍‍ | 14 | – | 7 | – | 0 | .667 | 20 | – | 22 | – | 0 | .476 |
| Brown ‍‍‍ | 13 | – | 8 | – | 0 | .619 | 23 | – | 20 | – | 0 | .535 |
| Columbia ‍‍‍ | 10 | – | 10 | – | 1 | .500 | 16 | – | 25 | – | 1 | .393 |
| Harvard ‍‍‍ | 9 | – | 12 | – | 0 | .429 | 11 | – | 26 | – | 0 | .297 |
| Princeton ‍‍‍ | 9 | – | 13 | – | 0 | .409 | 15 | – | 27 | – | 0 | .357 |
| Cornell ‍‍‍ | 8 | – | 13 | – | 0 | .381 | 11 | – | 26 | – | 0 | .297 |
| Dartmouth ‍‍‍ | 8 | – | 15 | – | 0 | .348 | 15 | – | 25 | – | 0 | .375 |
† – Conference champion ‡ – Tournament champion y – Invited to the NCAA Tournament; As of May 17, 2026; Rankings from D1Baseball

The 2026 Ivy League Baseball Tournament was a postseason baseball tournament for the Ivy League in the 2026 NCAA Division I baseball season. The tournament took place from May 15–17, 2026 at George H. W. Bush Field. The 32nd annual postseason Ivy tournament was won by Yale, who earned the conference's automatic berth to the 2026 NCAA Division I baseball tournament.

Columbia are the defending champions.

== Format ==
The top four teams in the Ivy League were seeded based on their records in league play. Ties in the standings were broken based on head-to-head record. The tournament was a double elimination tournament played at the site of the regular season champion.

| Seed | School | Conf. Record | CPCT. |
|---|---|---|---|
| 1 | Yale | 14–6–1 | .690 |
| 2 | Penn | 14–7 | .667 |
| 3 | Brown | 13–8 | .619 |
| 4 | Columbia | 10–10–1 | .500 |

Note: Harvard, Princeton, Cornell, and Dartmouth failed to qualify.

== Bracket ==
First Round
1 | Yale | 12
4 | Columbia | 3
Winner's bracket
2 | Penn | 4
3 | Brown | 7
4 | Columbia | 6
2 | Penn | 3
Loser's bracket

Semifinal
1 | Yale | 5
3 | Brown | 2
4 | Columbia | 2
3 | Brown | 4

Final
1 | Yale | 7 | -
3 | Brown | 5 | -

== Results ==
Game 1
| (4) Columbia Lions | vs. | (1) Yale Bulldogs |

May 15, 2026 12:00 p.m.
| Team | 1 | 2 | 3 | 4 | 5 | 6 | 7 | 8 | 9 | R | H | E |
|---|---|---|---|---|---|---|---|---|---|---|---|---|
| Columbia | 1 | 0 | 1 | 0 | 0 | 0 | 0 | 0 | 0 | 3 | 9 | 3 |
| Yale | 2 | 0 | 1 | 3 | 1 | 0 | 1 | 4 | X | 12 | 10 | 0 |
WP: Jack Ohman (5–2) LP: Thomas Santana (5–5); Home runs: Columbia: None; Yale: None; Attendance: 431; Boxscore

Game 2
| (3) Brown Bears | vs. | (2) Penn Quakers |

May 15, 2026 4:00 p.m.
| Team | 1 | 2 | 3 | 4 | 5 | 6 | 7 | 8 | 9 | R | H | E |
|---|---|---|---|---|---|---|---|---|---|---|---|---|
| Brown | 0 | 0 | 0 | 1 | 0 | 2 | 0 | 0 | 4 | 7 | 8 | 2 |
| Penn | 1 | 0 | 0 | 1 | 0 | 0 | 1 | 1 | 0 | 4 | 8 | 1 |
WP: Christian Keel (2–3) LP: Marty Coyne (5–5) Sv: Camren Piwnicki (1); Home runs: Brown: None; Penn: None; Attendance: 431; Notes: Boxscore

Game 3
| (2) Penn Quakers | vs. | (4) Columbia Lions |

May 16, 2026 12:00 p.m.
| Team | 1 | 2 | 3 | 4 | 5 | 6 | 7 | 8 | 9 | R | H | E |
|---|---|---|---|---|---|---|---|---|---|---|---|---|
| Penn | 1 | 1 | 0 | 0 | 0 | 0 | 1 | 0 | 0 | 3 | 9 | 1 |
| Columbia | 2 | 3 | 0 | 0 | 0 | 1 | 0 | 0 | X | 6 | 13 | 0 |
WP: Alex Sotiropoulos (2–4) LP: Ben Moulin (2–3) Sv: Will Harrigan (2); Home runs: Penn: None; Columbia: None; Attendance: 393; Notes: Penn Eliminated; Boxscore

Game 4
| (1) Yale Bulldogs | vs. | (3) Brown Bears |

May 16, 2026 4:00 p.m.
| Team | 1 | 2 | 3 | 4 | 5 | 6 | 7 | 8 | 9 | R | H | E |
|---|---|---|---|---|---|---|---|---|---|---|---|---|
| Yale | 1 | 0 | 0 | 0 | 0 | 4 | 0 | 0 | 0 | 5 | 11 | 1 |
| Brown | 1 | 0 | 0 | 0 | 0 | 0 | 0 | 0 | 1 | 2 | 6 | 0 |
WP: Tate Evans (7–1) LP: Dylan Reid (4–4) Sv: None; Home runs: Yale: Davis Hanson (6); Brown: Mika Peterson (6); Attendance: 407; Notes: Boxscore

Game 5
| (4) Columbia Lions | vs. | (3) Brown Bears |

May 17, 2026 12:00 p.m.
| Team | 1 | 2 | 3 | 4 | 5 | 6 | 7 | 8 | 9 | R | H | E |
|---|---|---|---|---|---|---|---|---|---|---|---|---|
| Columbia | 0 | 0 | 0 | 0 | 0 | 0 | 0 | 0 | 2 | 2 | 7 | 0 |
| Brown | 1 | 0 | 0 | 0 | 0 | 3 | 0 | 0 | X | 4 | 5 | 1 |
WP: Drew Nelson (6–3) LP: Jack Korthas (1–3) Sv: None; Home runs: Columbia: None; Brown: None; Attendance: 267; Notes: Columbia eliminated Boxscore

Game 6 (Championship Game)
| (3) Brown Bears | vs. | (1) Yale Bulldogs |

May 17, 2026 4:00 p.m.
| Team | 1 | 2 | 3 | 4 | 5 | 6 | 7 | 8 | 9 | R | H | E |
|---|---|---|---|---|---|---|---|---|---|---|---|---|
| Brown | 1 | 2 | 0 | 0 | 0 | 0 | 0 | 2 | 0 | 5 | 8 | 2 |
| Yale | 0 | 3 | 2 | 2 | 0 | 0 | 0 | 0 | X | 7 | 11 | 0 |
WP: Teo Spadaccini (5–1) LP: Camren Piwnicki (4–2) Sv: Jack Ohman (1); Home runs: Brown: None; Yale: None; Attendance: 427; Notes: Yale wins Ivy League tournament Boxscore

== All–Tournament Team ==
| Player | Team |
|---|---|
| **Jack Ohman** | Yale |
| Chris DiPrima | Yale |
| Tate Evans | Yale |
| Teo Spadaccini | Yale |
| Logan Meusy | Brown |
| Mark Henshon | Brown |
| Drew Nelson | Brown |
| Alex Sotiropoulos | Columbia |
| Cole Fellows | Columbia |
| Ryan Taylor | Penn |
| Jarrett Pokrovsky | Penn |

MVP in bold
