= 1999 Colonial Athletic Association baseball tournament =

American college baseball tournament

- Teams: 8
- Format: Double-elimination tournament
- Finals site: Grainger Stadium; Kinston, North Carolina
- Champions: East Carolina (6th title)
- Winning coach: Keith LeClair (1st title)
- MVP: James Molinari (East Carolina)

1999 Colonial Athletic Association baseball standings
	Conf.						Overall
Team	W		L		T	PCT	W		L		T	PCT
Richmond ‍†‍‍^{y}	15	–	5	–	0	.750	38	–	15	–	0	.717
No. 18 East Carolina ‍‍‡‍^{y}	14	–	6	–	0	.700	44	–	14	–	0	.759
VCU ‍‍‍^{y}	14	–	6	–	0	.700	41	–	20	–	0	.672
George Mason ‍‍‍	9	–	12	–	0	.429	30	–	24	–	1	.555
Old Dominion ‍‍‍	7	–	11	–	0	.389	38	–	17	–	0	.691
UNC Wilmington ‍‍‍	8	–	13	–	0	.381	30	–	26	–	0	.536
William & Mary ‍‍‍	7	–	12	–	0	.368	29	–	24	–	0	.547
James Madison ‍‍‍	6	–	15	–	0	.286	22	–	35	–	1	.388
† – Conference champion ‡ – Tournament champion y – Invited to the NCAA tournament As of June 30, 1999; Rankings from Collegiate Baseball

The 1999 Colonial Athletic Association baseball tournament was held at Grainger Stadium in Kinston, North Carolina, from May 18 through 23. The event determined the champion of the Colonial Athletic Association for the 1999 season. Second-seeded East Carolina won the tournament for the sixth time and earned the CAA's automatic bid to the 1999 NCAA Division I baseball tournament.

Entering the event, East Carolina had won the most championships, with five. Old Dominion and Richmond had each won three, while George Mason had won twice.

== Format and seeding ==
The CAA's teams were seeded one to eight based on winning percentage from the conference's round robin regular season. They played a double-elimination tournament.

Team	W	L	Pct.	GB	Seed
Richmond	15	5	.750	—	1
East Carolina	14	6	.700	1	2
VCU	14	6	.700	1	3
George Mason	9	12	.429	6.5	4
Old Dominion	7	11	.389	7	5
UNC Wilmington	8	13	.381	7.5	6
William & Mary	7	12	.368	7.5	7
James Madison	6	15	.286	9.5	8

== Bracket and results ==
Upper round 1	Upper round 2	Upper final	Final
1	Richmond	7
8	James Madison	1
1	Richmond	6
5	Old Dominion	7
4	George Mason	8
5	Old Dominion	9
5	Old Dominion	3
2	East Carolina	4
3	VCU	4
6	UNC Wilmington	1
3	VCU	7
2	East Carolina	8
2	East Carolina	10
7	William & Mary	3	2	East Carolina	21	—
5	Old Dominion	13	—
Lower round 1	Lower round 2	Lower round 3	Lower final
1	Richmond	10
8	James Madison	4	8	James Madison	1	5	Old Dominion	10
7	William & Mary	3	1	Richmond	8	4	George Mason	3
4	George Mason	12
3	VCU	0
4	George Mason	8	4	George Mason	8
6	UNC Wilmington	5

== Most Valuable Player ==
James Molinari was named Tournament Most Valuable Player. Molinari was an outfielder for East Carolina.
