= 1999 Florida Gators baseball team =

American college baseball season

1999 Florida Gators baseball
- Conference: Southeastern Conference
- Record: 31–25 (13–17 SEC)
- Head coach: Andy Lopez (5th year)
- Assistant coach: Mark Wasikowski (1st year)
- Home stadium: Alfred A. McKethan Stadium

1999 Southeastern Conference baseball standings
	Conf.				Overall
Team	W		L	PCT	W		L	PCT
Eastern Division
South Carolina ^{x}‍‍‍	15	–	15	.500	35	–	23	.603
Kentucky ‍‍‍	13	–	17	.433	25	–	32	.439
Florida ‍‍‍	13	–	17	.433	31	–	25	.554
Tennessee ‍‍‍	10	–	20	.333	28	–	28	.500
Georgia ‍‍‍	8	–	20	.286	25	–	30	.455
Vanderbilt ‍‍‍	8	–	22	.267	22	–	33	.400
Western Division
No. 17 Arkansas ^{x}‍†‍‍^{y}	22	–	8	.733	42	–	23	.646
No. 4 Alabama ‍‍‡‍^{y}	21	–	9	.700	53	–	16	.768
No. 14 LSU ‍‍‍^{y}	18	–	11	.621	41	–	24	.631
No. 15 Auburn ‍‍‍^{y}	18	–	12	.600	46	–	19	.708
Ole Miss ‍‍‍^{y}	17	–	13	.567	34	–	28	.548
No. 30 Mississippi State ‍‍‍^{y}	15	–	14	.517	42	–	21	.667
x – Division champion † – Conference champion ‡ – Tournament champion y – Invited to the NCAA tournament As of June 30, 1999; Rankings from Collegiate Baseball

The 1999 Florida Gators baseball team represented the University of Florida in the sport of baseball during the 1999 college baseball season. The Gators competed in Division I of the National Collegiate Athletic Association (NCAA) and the Eastern Division of the Southeastern Conference (SEC). They played their home games at Alfred A. McKethan Stadium, on the university's Gainesville, Florida campus. The team was coached by Andy Lopez, who was in his fifth season at Florida.

== Roster ==
1999 Florida Gators baseball team
Players
Coaches

#	Pos.	Name	B/T	Height	Weight	Year	Home town
24	RHP	Jay Belflower	R/R	6 ft 4 in (1.93 m)	215 lb (98 kg)	Fr	Sebring, FL
54	C	Weber Bowen	R/R	6 ft 1 in (1.85 m)	215 lb (98 kg)	Fr	Minneapolis, MN
45	RHP	Keith Brice	R/R	6 ft 2 in (1.88 m)	195 lb (88 kg)	So	Miami, FL
17	OF	Reche Caldwell	R/R	6 ft 1 in (1.85 m)	195 lb (88 kg)	Fr	Tampa, FL
6	INF	Josh Canales	R/R	5 ft 11 in (1.8 m)	170 lb (77 kg)	So	Los Angeles, CA
41	RHP	Jeff Cardozo	R/R	6 ft 4 in (1.93 m)	190 lb (86 kg)	So	Hobe Sound, FL
22	OF	Greg Catalanotte	S/R	6 ft 3 in (1.91 m)	215 lb (98 kg)	Sr	Glendale, AZ
33	LHP	Chad Christianson	L/L	6 ft 4 in (1.93 m)	196 lb (89 kg)	Fr	Ormond Beach, FL
49	RHP	Kevin Coleman	R/R	6 ft 1 in (1.85 m)	195 lb (88 kg)	Fr	Marietta, GA
28	RHP	Derek DeVaughan	R/R	6 ft 5 in (1.96 m)	220 lb (100 kg)	Jr	Binger, OK
30	INF	Jason Dill	L/L	6 ft 2 in (1.88 m)	210 lb (95 kg)	So	Punta Gorda, FL
2	INF	Mark Ellis	R/R	6 ft 0 in (1.83 m)	180 lb (82 kg)	Sr	Rapid City, SD
47	OF	Mike Floyd	R/R	6 ft 2 in (1.88 m)	210 lb (95 kg)	Jr	Brandon, FL
27	LHP	Ryan Gleichowski	L/L	5 ft 10 in (1.78 m)	171 lb (78 kg)	So	Clearwater, FL
9	OF	Matt Goss	L/L	5 ft 10 in (1.78 m)	173 lb (78 kg)	Fr	Bartow, FL
46	RHP	Ben Grezlovski	R/R	5 ft 11 in (1.8 m)	180 lb (82 kg)	Sr	Pinecrest, FL
21	RHP	Alex Hart	R/R	6 ft 6 in (1.98 m)	215 lb (98 kg)	Fr	Marion, PA
37	OF	Brian Haught	R/R	5 ft 10 in (1.78 m)	185 lb (84 kg)	Sr	Tampa, FL
31	C	Matt Heath	S/R	6 ft 1 in (1.85 m)	195 lb (88 kg)	Fr	Fernandina Beach, FL
13	OF	Jason Hutton	R/R	5 ft 11 in (1.8 m)	190 lb (86 kg)	Jr	Palm Beach, FL
20	C	Todd Johannes	R/R	6 ft 3 in (1.91 m)	183 lb (83 kg)	Sr	Miami, FL
3	INF	Tim Johnson	R/R	6 ft 0 in (1.83 m)	195 lb (88 kg)	So	Coventry, CT
36	RHP	Kevin Keen	R/R	6 ft 5 in (1.96 m)	225 lb (102 kg)	Fr	Wauchula, FL
5	INF	Kurt Keene	R/R	6 ft 0 in (1.83 m)	190 lb (86 kg)	Jr	Chattanooga, TN
40	INF	David Klebonis	R/R	6 ft 0 in (1.83 m)	200 lb (91 kg)	Fr	Orlando, FL
34	RHP	Matt McClendon	R/R	6 ft 6 in (1.98 m)	225 lb (102 kg)	Jr	Orlando, FL
42	LHP	Stuart McFarland	L/L	6 ft 5 in (1.96 m)	210 lb (95 kg)	So	Arden Hills, MN
39	OF	Pete McKinney	R/R	5 ft 11 in (1.8 m)	185 lb (84 kg)	Sr	Melbourne, FL
26	OF	Peter Nystrom	R/R	6 ft 2 in (1.88 m)	189 lb (86 kg)	So	Dunedin, FL
25	LHP	Sergio Rodriguez	R/L	6 ft 0 in (1.83 m)	195 lb (88 kg)	Sr	Miami, FL
55	C	Brian Rose	R/R	6 ft 2 in (1.88 m)	225 lb (102 kg)	Fr	Miami, FL
32	OF	Shane Seroyer	R/R	6 ft 0 in (1.83 m)	189 lb (86 kg)	Sr	Neptune Beach, FL
43	INF	Ryan Shealy	R/R	6 ft 5 in (1.96 m)	240 lb (109 kg)	Fr	Fort Lauderdale, FL
11	INF	Matt Siegel	L/R	5 ft 10 in (1.78 m)	175 lb (79 kg)	So	Tampa, FL
12	C	Tony Socarras, Jr.	L/R	6 ft 0 in (1.83 m)	190 lb (86 kg)	Jr	Miami, FL
48	OF	Aaron Walker	R/R	6 ft 6 in (1.98 m)	250 lb (113 kg)	Fr	Mims, FL
18	RHP	K.O. Wiegandt	R/R	6 ft 1 in (1.85 m)	201 lb (91 kg)	Jr	Miami, FL
4	OF	Spencer Williams	L/R	5 ft 6 in (1.68 m)	169 lb (77 kg)	So	Lansdale, PA
16	INF	Taylor Wood	R/R	6 ft 0 in (1.83 m)	170 lb (77 kg)	So	Fernandina Beach, FL

Head coach

Andy Lopez

Assistant coach(es)

Mark Wasikowski

Legend

- (C) Team captain
- (S) Suspended
- (I) Ineligible
- Injured
- Current redshirt

Roster

== Schedule ==
Legend
	Florida win
	Florida loss
	Postponement
**Bold**	Florida team member

1999 Florida Gators baseball game log
Regular Season
February

Date	Opponent	Rank	Stadium Site	Score	Win	Loss	Save	Attendance	Overall Record	SEC Record
February 6	No. 6 Miami (FL); Rivalry	No. 14	McKethan Stadium	7–4	**Brice** (1–0)	Walker (0–1)	None	5,169	1–0	–
February 7	No. 6 Miami (FL); Rivalry	No. 14	McKethan Stadium	14–12	**Grezlovski** (1–0)	Neu (1–1)	None	4,431	2–0	–
February 12	at No. 8 Miami (FL); Rivalry	No. 6	Mark Light Stadium; Coral Gables, FL	4–7	Walker (1–1)	**Brice** (1–1)	Neu (1)	3,560	2–1	–
February 13	at No. 8 Miami (FL); Rivalry	No. 6	Mark Light Stadium	3–10	Howell (1–0)	**Hart** (0–1)	None	3,722	2–2	–
February 16	Chuo Gakuin (exh.)	No. 7	McKethan Stadium	0–0	None	None	None	510	–	–
February 20	at No. 1 Florida State; Rivalry	No. 7	Dick Howser Stadium; Tallahassee, FL	6–5	**McClendon** (1–0)	Chavez (1–1)	**Brice** (1)	4,841	3–2	–
February 21	at No. 1 Florida State; Rivalry	No. 7	Dick Howser Stadium	3–12	Stocks (3–0)	**Belflower** (0–1)	None	4,612	3–3	–
February 24	Florida A&M	No. 6	McKethan Stadium	8–5	**Cardozo** (1–0)	Benton (1–2)	None	1,255	4–3	–
February 27	No. 1 Florida State; Rivalry	No. 6	McKethan Stadium	4–2	**McClendon** (2–0)	Chavez (1–2)	None	5,657	5–3	–
February 28	No. 1 Florida State; Rivalry	No. 6	McKethan Stadium	4–8	Stocks (4–0)	**Hart** (0–2)	None	5,203	5–4	–

March

Date	Opponent	Rank	Stadium Site	Score	Win	Loss	Save	Attendance	Overall Record	SEC Record
March 2	UNC Greensboro	No. 6	McKethan Stadium	10–4	**Brice** (2–1)	McDonald (0–1)	None	1,888	6–4	–
March 3	UNC Greensboro	No. 6	McKethan Stadium	16–7	**McClendon** (3–0)	–	–	–	7–4	–
March 5	Central Michigan	No. 6	McKethan Stadium	4–2	**Belflower** (1–1)	Jackson (0–1)	**Grezlovski** (1)	1,726	8–4	–
March 6	Central Michigan	No. 6	McKethan Stadium	4–3	**Grezlovski** (2–0)	Hesselink (0–1)	None	1,872	9–4	–
March 7	Central Michigan	No. 6	McKethan Stadium	7–2	**Grezlovski** (3–0)	Smoot (0–1)	None	2,417	10–4	–
March 9	Winthrop	No. 5	McKethan Stadium	3–4	Sundsmo (1–1)	**Grezlovski** (3–1)	None	1,069	10–5	–
March 10	Winthrop	No. 5	McKethan Stadium	8–7	**McFarland** (1–0)	Horner (1–1)	**Grezlovski** (2)	1,073	11–5	–
March 12	at No. 9 LSU	No. 5	Alex Box Stadium; Baton Rouge, LA	3–8	Ainsworth (5–0)	**McClendon** (3–1)	None	7,219	11–6	0–1
March 14 (1)	at No. 9 LSU	No. 5	Alex Box Stadium	6–4	**Brice** (3–1)	Bowe (4–1)	**Cardozo** (1)	6,921	12–6	1–1
March 14 (2)	at No. 9 LSU	No. 5	Alex Box Stadium	5–7	Hodges (1–1)	**Grezlovski** (3–2)	None	6,772	12–7	1–2
March 16	Fordham	No. 12	McKethan Stadium	5–4	**Coleman** (1–0)	Kozlowski (0–2)	**Grezlovski** (3)	1,034	13–7	–
March 17	Army	No. 12	McKethan Stadium	10–6	**DeVaughan** (1–0)	Elliott (0–1)	None	1,079	14–7	–
March 19	Tennessee	No. 12	McKethan Stadium	14–2	**Brice** (4–1)	Brown (1–1)	None	2,465	15–7	2–2
March 20	Tennessee	No. 12	McKethan Stadium	9–8^{13}	**Grezlovski** (4–2)	Tisdale (3–5)	None	3,242	16–7	3–2
March 21	Tennessee	No. 12	McKethan Stadium	18–2	**McClendon** (4–1)	Patterson (2–3)	**Rodriguez** (1)	2,898	17–7	4–2
March 23	Troy State	No. 11	McKethan Stadium	12–6	**Cardozo** (2–0)	Hanson (0–1)	**McFarland** (1)	1,348	18–7	–
March 24	Troy State	No. 11	McKethan Stadium	10–1	**Brice** (5–1)	Shelley (2–1)	**Grezlovski** (4)	1,575	19–7	–
March 26	at Georgia	No. 11	Foley Field; Athens, GA	6–5	**Grezlovski** (5–2)	Sledge (1–1)	None	854	20–7	5–2
March 27	at Georgia	No. 11	Foley Field	8–7^{10}	**Grezlovski** (6–2)	Goodson (4–2)	None	1,346	21–7	6–2
March 28	at Georgia	No. 11	Foley Field	3–12	–	–	–	–	21–8	6–3
March 30	Jacksonville	No. 10	McKethan Stadium	5–6^{11}	–	–	–	–	21–9	–

April

Date	Opponent	Rank	Stadium Site	Score	Win	Loss	Save	Attendance	Overall Record	SEC Record
April 2	Arkansas	No. 10	McKethan Stadium	1–8	Walling (5–1)	**McClendon** (4–2)	None	3,375	21–10	6–4
April 3	Arkansas	No. 10	McKethan Stadium	5–6	Wright (1–4)	**Grezlovski** (6–4)	None	2,967	21–11	6–5
April 4	Arkansas	No. 10	McKethan Stadium	5–10	–	–	–	–	21–12	6–6
April 7	Bethune–Cookman	No. 19	McKethan Stadium	20–4	–	–	–	–	22–12	–
April 9	at Ole Miss	No. 19	Swayze Field; Oxford, MS	0–8	McAvoy (6–3)	**McClendon** (4–3)	None	2,007	22–13	6–7
April 10	at Ole Miss	No. 19	Swayze Field	5–6^{11}	–	–	–	–	22–14	6–8
April 11	at Ole Miss	No. 19	Swayze Field	4–14	Lyons (2–1)	**Belflower** (1–2)	None	1,906	22–15	6–9
April 14	at Stetson		Conrad Park; DeLand, FL	9–5	**Rodriguez** (1–0)	Welch (0–2)	None	2,486	23–15	–
April 16	Kentucky		McKethan Stadium	0–5	Kent (2–5)	**Cardozo** (2–1)	None	1,125	23–16	6–10
April 17	Kentucky		McKethan Stadium	2–9	Shaffar (4–4)	**Belflower** (1–3)	None	1,875	23–17	6–11
April 18	Kentucky		McKethan Stadium	10–3	**Brice** (6–3)	Webb (2–4)	None	1,591	24–17	7–11
April 21	Stetson		McKethan Stadium	7–1	**Hart** (2–2)	House (3–6)	None	1,704	25–17	–
April 23	No. 22 South Carolina		McKethan Stadium	14–15	Hadden (7–2)	**Cardozo** (2–2)	Pomar (8)	2,358	25–18	7–12
April 24	No. 22 South Carolina		McKethan Stadium	8–4	**Grezlovski** (7–5)	Bouknight (6–3)	None	2,408	26–18	8–12
April 25	No. 22 South Carolina		McKethan Stadium	5–4	**Grezlovski** (8–5)	Pomar (2–2)	None	2,057	27–18	9–12
April 30	at Vanderbilt		McGugin Field; Nashville, TN	5–4	**Grezlovski** (9–5)	Maultsby (1–6)	None	348	28–18	10–12

May

Date	Opponent	Rank	Stadium Site	Score	Win	Loss	Save	Attendance	Overall Record	SEC Record
May 1	at Vanderbilt		Greer Stadium; Nashville, TN	17–6	**Brice** (7–3)	Beal (3–2)	None	1,216	29–18	11–12
May 2	at Vanderbilt		McGugin Field	10–7	**Hart** (3–2)	Prior (4–8)	None	311	30–18	12–12
May 5	South Florida		McKethan Stadium	7–11	Royal (1–1)	**Belflower** (1–4)	None	1,584	30–19	–
May 7	at No. 25 Mississippi State		Dudy Noble Field; Starkville, MS	0–9	Compton (6–1)	**Cardozo** (2–3)	None	3,922	30–20	12–13
May 8	at No. 25 Mississippi State		Dudy Noble Field	6–4	**Rodriguez** (2–0)	Thoms (7–4)	**Grezlovski** (5)	5,975	31–20	13–13
May 9	at No. 25 Mississippi State		Dudy Noble Field	8–15	Ginter (7–6)	**Hart** (3–3)	None	3,813	31–21	13–14
May 11	Central Florida		McKethan Stadium	7–8	Arnold (7–4)	**Grezlovski** (9–6)	None	1,630	31–22	–
May 14	No. 12 Alabama		McKethan Stadium	10-12	Blankenship (8–2)	**Grezlovski** (9–7)	None	2,584	31–23	13–15
May 15	No. 12 Alabama		McKethan Stadium	3–4	Murphy (6–0)	**Hart** (3–4)	Blankenship (3)	2,030	31–24	13–16
May 16	No. 12 Alabama		McKethan Stadium	8–11	Blankenship (9–2)	**Grezlovski** (9–8)	None	2,797	31–25	13–17

Rankings from Collegiate Baseball. All times Eastern. Retrieved from FloridaGators.com

== See also ==
- Florida Gators
- List of Florida Gators baseball players
