= 1999 Midwestern Collegiate Conference baseball tournament =

- Teams: 6
- Format: Double-elimination
- Finals site: Les Miller Field; Chicago, Illinois
- Champions: Milwaukee (1st title)
- Winning coach: Jerry Augustine (1st title)
- MVP: Chad Sadowski (Milwaukee)

1999 Midwestern Collegiate Conference baseball standings
	Conf.				Overall
Team	W		L	PCT	W		L	PCT
Butler ‍‍‍	14	–	6	.700	29	–	27	.518
Milwaukee ‍‍‡‍^{y}	11	–	7	.611	31	–	29	.517
Cleveland State ‍‍‍	12	–	8	.600	22	–	34	.393
Wright State ‍‍‍	8	–	10	.444	26	–	28	.481
UIC ‍‍‍	6	–	12	.333	18	–	30	.375
Detroit ‍‍‍	5	–	13	.278	14	–	33	.298
‡ – Tournament champion y – Invited to the NCAA Tournament; As of June 30, 1999; Rankings from Collegiate Baseball

The 1999 Midwestern Collegiate Conference baseball tournament took place from May 14 through 17, near the close of the 1999 NCAA Division I baseball season. All six of the league's teams met in the double-elimination tournament held at Les Miller Field on the campus of UIC in Chicago. Second seeded Milwaukee won their second Horizon League Championship and earned the conference's automatic bid to the 1999 NCAA Division I baseball tournament.

== Seeding and format ==
The league's teams are seeded one through six based on winning percentage, using conference games only. The teams then played a double-elimination tournament, with the top seed playing the sixth, second seed playing the fifth, and so on in the first round..

Team	W	L	PCT	GB	Seed
Butler	14	6	.700	—	1
Milwaukee	11	7	.611	2	2
Cleveland State	12	8	.600	2	3
Wright State	8	10	.444	5	4
UIC	6	12	.333	7	5
Detroit	5	13	.278	8	6

== Bracket and results ==
First round
1	Butler	3
6	Detroit	2
3	Cleveland State	7 ^{(10)}
4	Wright State	6
5	UIC	12
2	Milwaukee	7

Second round
1	Butler	1
4	Wright State	4
6	Detroit	3
2	Milwaukee	12
3	Cleveland State	0
5	UIC	4
1	Butler	8
3	Cleveland State	5

Third round
4	Wright State	2
2	Milwaukee	3
5	UIC	1
1	Butler	11

Semifinals
2	Milwaukee	10
5	UIC	2

Final
2	Milwaukee	10
1	Butler	2

== All-Tournament Team ==
The following players were named to the All-Tournament Team.

Pos	Name	School
P	Steve Carlson	UIC
P	Chad Sadowski	Milwaukee
C	Todd Ludwig	Milwaukee
1B	J.J. Kotarak	Milwaukee
2B	Steve Tylke	Milwaukee
3B	Jeff Haase	Cleveland State
SS	Justin Keever	Butler
OF	Jeremy Sinsabaugh	Butler
OF	Al Candea	UIC
OF	Darin Haugom	Milwaukee
DH	Tom Bohr	Wright State

=== Most Valuable Player ===
Chad Sadowski of Milwaukee was named Most Valuable Player of the Tournament.
