= City Park (New Rochelle, New York) =

Baseball venue in New York, United States

- Interactive map of City Park
- Location: 491 5th Ave. Rochelle, NY, 10801
- Coordinates: 40.930831°N 73.770586°W
- Owner: City of New Rochelle, New York
- Operator: City of New Rochelle, New York
- Surface: Synthetic turf
- Field size: Left Field: 355 feet (108 m); Center Field: 385 feet (117 m); Right Field: 330 feet (100 m)
- Acreage: 20

Construction
- Renovated: 2011

Tenant
- Iona Gaels baseball (NCAA DI MAAC) (2013–present)

City Field is a baseball venue located in the public park of Williams Flowers Park in New Rochelle, New York, United States. It is home to the Iona Gaels baseball team of the NCAA Division I Metro Atlantic Athletic Conference (MAAC). The field's namesake is after William "Brud" Flowers, a New Rochelle resident and athletics coach.

== History ==
In 2011, the fields were renovated and replaced with synthetic turf. In September, 2012, it was announced that the Iona Gaels baseball team would be moving their home games to City Park.

== Features ==
The field's features include a synthetic turf playing surface, dugouts, restrooms and lights.

== See also ==
- List of NCAA Division I baseball venues
