= 1999 Big South Conference baseball tournament =

- Teams: 6
- Format: Double-elimination
- Finals site: Charles Watson Stadium; Conway, South Carolina
- Champions: Winthrop (3rd title)
- Winning coach: Joe Hudak (1st title)
- MVP: Matt Kozaria (Winthrop)

1999 Big South Conference baseball standings
	Conf.				Overall
Team	W		L	PCT	W		L	PCT
Coastal Carolina ‍†‍‍	10	–	2	.833	43	–	15	.741
Winthrop ‍‍‡‍^{y}	9	–	6	.600	40	–	23	.635
Radford ‍‍‍	7	–	7	.500	22	–	30	.423
Liberty ‍‍‍	7	–	8	.467	26	–	28	.481
Charleston Southern ‍‍‍	5	–	8	.385	26	–	32	.448
UNC Asheville ‍‍‍	4	–	11	.267	21	–	39	.350
Elon ‍‍‍	0	–	0	–	20	–	35	.364
High Point ‍‍‍	0	–	0	–	11	–	39	.220
† – Conference champion ‡ – Tournament champion y – Invited to the NCAA tournament As of June 30, 1999; Rankings from Collegiate Baseball

The 1999 Big South Conference baseball tournament was the postseason baseball tournament for the Big South Conference, held from May 20 through 23 at Charles Watson Stadium, home field of regular season champion Coastal Carolina in Conway, South Carolina. The top six finishers from the regular season participated in the double-elimination tournament. The champion, Winthrop, won the title for the third time, and first since 1987, and earned an invitation to the 1999 NCAA Division I baseball tournament.

== Format ==
The top six finishers from the regular season qualified for the tournament. The teams were seeded one through six and played a double-elimination tournament. New members Elon and High Point were ineligible for conference competition, making all returning members automatically qualifying for the event.

Team	W	L	Pct.	GB	Seed
Coastal Carolina	10	2	.833	—	1
Winthrop	9	6	.600	2.5	2
Radford	7	7	.500	4	3
Liberty	7	8	.467	4.5	4
Charleston Southern	5	8	.385	5.5	5
UNC Asheville	4	11	.267	7.5	6
Elon	0	0	—	—	—
High Point	0	0	—	—	—

== Bracket and results ==
First round
1	Coastal Carolina	3
6	UNC Asheville	2
3	Radford	0
4	Liberty	8
2	Winthrop	8
5	Charleston Southern	7

Second round
1	Coastal Carolina	8
3	Radford	7
4	Liberty	0
2	Winthrop	13
6	UNC Asheville	8
5	Charleston Southern	3

Third round
1	Coastal Carolina	3
2	Winthrop	4
4	Liberty	6
6	UNC Asheville	5

Semifinals
1	Coastal Carolina	11
4	Liberty	10

Final
2	Winthrop	6	—
1	Coastal Carolina	3	—

== All-Tournament Team ==
Name	School
Jason Colson	Winthrop
Ron Deubel	Coastal Carolina
Matt Kozaria	Winthrop
Todd Leathers	Winthrop
Brooks Marzka	Coastal Carolina
Trey Miller	Radford
Ryan Moffett	UNC Asheville
Anthony Pennix	Liberty
Kevin Schnall	Coastal Carolina
Jason Tarasuik	Winthrop
Josh Ury	Winthrop
Sean Walsh	Radford

=== Most Valuable Player ===
Matt Kozaria was named Tournament Most Valuable Player. Kozaria was a pitcher for Winthrop.
