= Conor Burke (baseball) =

American baseball player

Current position
- Title: Head coach
- Team: Iona
- Conference: MAAC
- Record: 69–178 (.279)

Playing career
- 2009: Suffolk County CC
- 2010: Guilford Tech CC
- 2011–2012: Queens
- Position: Outfielder

Coaching career (HC unless noted)
- 2013: Queens (Asst)
- 2014: Concordia (NY) (Asst)
- 2015: Adelphi (INF/OF)
- 2016–2019: Maine (H/RC)
- 2020–2021: Dartmouth (H/OF/RC)
- 2022–present: Iona

Head coaching record
- Overall: 69–178 (.279)
- Tournaments: NCAA: 0–0

Conor O. Burke is a baseball coach and former outfielder, who is the current head baseball coach of the Iona Gaels. He played college baseball at Suffolk County Community College and Guilford Technical Community College before transferring to Queens where he played from 2011 to 2012.

== Playing career ==
Burke attended St. Dominic High School, in Oyster Bay, New York, where he was named Catholic HS All Long island. Afterwards he played college baseball at Suffolk County Community College and Guilford Technical Community College. As a sophomore at Guilford Tech, Burke batted .294 with one homerun and 12 RBI. For his final two years of college baseball, Burke transferred to Queens College. As a junior, Burke batted .282 with two homeruns and 18 RBI.

== Coaching career ==
Immediately following the conclusion of his playing career, Burke joined the coaching staff of his alma mater, Queens College. For the 2014 season, Burke joined the staff at Concordia College (New York). He made another move prior to the start of the 2015 season, joining Adelphi University working with their infielders and outfielders. He landed his first NCAA Division I job in the summer of 2015, joining Steve Trimper's staff at Maine. When Trimper left for Stetson the following summer, new head coach Nick Derba retained Burke on his staff and named him Recruiting Coordinator. On August 29, 2019, he joined the coaching staff at Dartmouth.

On August 19, 2021, Burke was named the head baseball coach of the Iona Gaels.

== Head coaching record ==
Record table
Season	Team	Overall	Conference	Standing	Postseason
Iona Gaels (Metro Atlantic Athletic Conference) (2022–present)
2022	Iona	6–41	6–18	11th	
2023	Iona	13–38	9–15	9th	
2024	Iona	12–38	6–18	10th	
2025	Iona	19–33	13–17	10th	
2026	Iona	19–28	15–14	7th	
Iona:		69–178 (.279)	49–82 (.374)		
Total:		69–178 (.279)			
National champion Postseason invitational champion Conference regular season champion Conference regular season and conference tournament champion Division regular season champion Division regular season and conference tournament champion Conference tournament champion
