= 1999 Trans America Athletic Conference baseball tournament =

American college baseball tournament

- Teams: 6
- Format: Double-elimination
- Finals site: Osceola County Stadium; Kissimmee, Florida
- Champions: Jacksonville (1st title)
- Winning coach: Danny Price (1st title)
- MVP: Mike Nebel (Mercer)

1999 Trans America Athletic Conference baseball standings
	Conf.				Overall
Team	W		L	PCT	W		L	PCT
No. 20 Florida Atlantic ‍†‍‍^{y}	26	–	4	.867	54	–	9	.857
Jacksonville ‍‍‡‍^{y}	22	–	8	.733	41	–	23	.641
Mercer ‍‍‍	19	–	11	.633	36	–	24	.600
UCF ‍‍‍	19	–	11	.633	38	–	21	.644
Troy State ‍‍‍	15	–	15	.500	31	–	28	.525
Centenary ‍‍‍	14	–	16	.467	21	–	35	.375
Georgia State ‍‍‍	13	–	17	.433	23	–	33	.411
Jacksonville State ‍‍‍	13	–	17	.433	22	–	30	.423
Stetson ‍‍‍	11	–	19	.367	23	–	31	.426
Samford ‍‍‍	8	–	22	.267	20	–	33	.377
Campbell ‍‍‍	5	–	25	.167	24	–	32	.429
† – Conference champion ‡ – Tournament champion y – Invited to the NCAA tournament As of June 30, 1999; Rankings from Collegiate Baseball

The 1999 Trans America Athletic Conference baseball tournament was held at Osceola County Stadium in Kissimmee, Florida. This was the twenty-first tournament championship held by the Trans America Athletic Conference. Jacksonville won their first tournament championship and earned the conference's automatic bid to the 1999 NCAA Division I baseball tournament.

== Format and seeding ==
The top six finishers by conference winning percentage qualified for the tournament, with the top seed playing the lowest seed in the first round.

Team	W	L	Pct.	GB	Seed
Florida Atlantic	26	4	.867	—	1
Jacksonville	22	8	.733	4	2
Mercer	19	11	.633	7	3
UCF	19	11	.633	7	4
Troy State	15	15	.500	11	5
Centenary	14	16	.467	12	6
Georgia State	13	17	.433	13	—
Jacksonville State	13	17	.433	13	—
Stetson	11	19	.367	15	—
Samford	8	22	.267	18	—
Campbell	5	25	.167	21	—

== Bracket ==
First round
1	Florida Atlantic	18
6	Centenary	5
3	Mercer	5
4	UCF	4
2	Jacksonville	3
5	Troy State	4

Second round
1	Florida Atlantic	4
4	UCF	7
2	Jacksonville	11
6	Centenary	4
3	Mercer	6
5	Troy State	3
5	Troy State	11^{10}
1	Florida Atlantic	4

Third round
4	UCF	1
2	Jacksonville	5
3	Mercer	9
5	Troy State	10

Semifinals
2	Jacksonville	2
3	Mercer	1

Final
2	Jacksonville	9
5	Troy State	4

== All-Tournament Team ==
The following players were named to the All-Tournament Team.

POS	Player	School
P	Trey Wright	Troy State
P	James Ray	Jacksonville
C	Tom Gregorio	Troy State
IF	Jeff Nebel	Mercer
IF	Todd Lancaster	Troy State
IF	Paul Stryhas	Florida Atlantic
IF	Chad Olivia	Jacksonville
OF	Darryl Stephens	UCF
OF	Kirk Asche	Jacksonville
OF	Josh Hurrell	Jacksonville
DH	James Rodgers	Jacksonville

=== Most Valuable Player ===
Jeff Nebel was named Tournament Most Valuable Player. Nebe was a pitcher for Mercer.
