= NESCAC baseball tournament =

NESCAC Baseball Tournament
- Conference Baseball Tournament
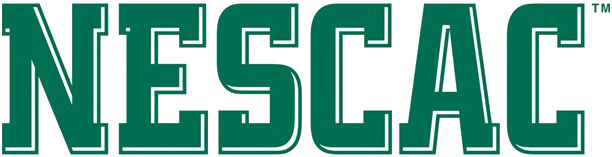
- Sport: Baseball
- Conference: NESCAC
- Number of teams: 8
- Format: Best-of-three series (quarterfinals); Double-elimination (semifinals, finals)
- Current stadium: Murren Family Field at DiBenedetto Stadium
- Current location: Hartford, Connecticut
- Played: 2001–present
- Last contest: 2025
- Current champion: Middlebury (4)
- Most championships: Tufts (7)
- Official website: nescac.com/sports/baseball

Host stadiums
- List: Murren Family Field at DiBenedetto Stadium (2004, 2008, 2012, 2018, 2022, 2026) Huskins Field (2002, 2014, 2021) Coombs Field (2017, 2019, 2023) Holman Stadium (2015–2016) Andrus Field (2013) Memorial Field (2003, 2005, 2011) Bobby Coombs Field (2001, 2007) Sol Gittleman Park (2024) Pickard Baseball Diamond (2006, 2025)

Host locations
- List: Hartford, CT (2004, 2008, 2012, 2018, 2022, 2026) Medford, MA (2002, 2014, 2021, 2024) Waterville, ME (2017, 2019, 2023) Nashua, NH (2015–2016) Middletown, CT (2013) Amherst, MA (2003, 2005, 2011) Williamstown, MA (2001, 2007) Brunswick, ME (2006, 2025)

The NESCAC baseball tournament is the conference tournament in baseball for the New England Small College Athletic Conference (NESCAC). It is a best-of-three series followed by a double-elimination tournament and seeding is based on regular-season records. The winner receives the conference's automatic bid to the NCAA Division III baseball tournament.

== Tournament ==
The NESCAC Baseball tournament is a best-of-three series followed by a double-elimination tournament held each year at rotating campus sites. Eight of the ten NESCAC teams qualify for the tournament. The winner earns the NESCAC's guaranteed bid to the NCAA Tournament.

== History ==
Until 2022, the Conference Tournament featured four teams in a double-elimination tournament. There was no tournament in 2020 due to the COVID-19 pandemic. Due to a shortened 2021 season, a championship series was held between the top team of each division. In 2022, a new format was unveiled, which would feature the top four teams of each division qualifying for the NESCAC tournament. A best-of-three series will be played in the quarterfinal round. Then, a double-elimination tournament will be played between the final four teams.

== Results ==
Ed.	Year	Hosts	Champions	Score and Venue	Runners-up	Third place	Fourth place	No. teams
1	2001	Williams College	Williams Ephs	8–5; Bobby Coombs Field, Williamstown	Tufts Jumbos	Amherst Mammoths	Trinity Bantams	4
2	2002	Tufts University	Tufts Jumbos	(Note: Tufts was awarded the 2002 championship after Game 7 of the tournament was rained out.); Huskins Field, Medford	Trinity Bantams	Wesleyan Cardinals	Williams Ephs	4
3	2003	Amherst College	Trinity Bantams	5–3; Memorial Field, Amherst	Amherst Mammoths	Williams Ephs	Tufts Jumbos	4
4	2004	Trinity College	Amherst Mammoths	5–4; Murren Family Field at DiBenedetto Stadium, Hartford	Williams Ephs	Bowdoin Polar Bears	Trinity Bantams	4
5	2005	Amherst College	Amherst Mammoths	8–7 (F/10); Memorial Field, Amherst	Trinity Bantams	Wesleyan Cardinals	Tufts Jumbos	4
6	2006	Bowdoin College	Middlebury Panthers	8–1; Pickard Baseball Diamond, Brunswick	Tufts Jumbos	Bowdoin Polar Bears	Williams Ephs	4
7	2007	Amherst College	Williams Ephs	5–3; Memorial Field, Amherst	Tufts Jumbos	Amherst Mammoths	Bowdoin Polar Bears	4
8	2008	Trinity College	Trinity Bantams	11–8; Murren Family Field at DiBenedetto Stadium, Hartford	Amherst Mammoths	Tufts Jumbos	Williams Ephs	4
9	2009	Williams College	Trinity Bantams	7–3; Bobby Coombs Field, Williamstown	Tufts Jumbos	Williams Ephs	Wesleyan Cardinals	4
10	2010	Tufts University	Tufts Jumbos	6–1; Huskins Field, Medford	Bowdoin Polar Bears	Williams Ephs	Wesleyan Cardinals	4
11	2011	Amherst College	Tufts Jumbos	(Note: Tufts was awarded the 2011 championship after Games 6 and 7 of the tournament were rained out.); Memorial Field, Amherst	Bowdoin Polar Bears	Amherst Mammoths	Middlebury Panthers	4
12	2012	Trinity College	Trinity Bantams	6–0; Murren Family Field at DiBenedetto Stadium, Hartford	Bowdoin Polar Bears	Williams Ephs	Amherst Mammoths	4
13	2013	Wesleyan University	Amherst Mammoths	7–0; Andrus Field, Middletown	Wesleyan Cardinals	Trinity Bantams	Bowdoin Polar Bears	4
14	2014	Tufts University	Wesleyan Cardinals	6–4; Huskins Field, Medford	Tufts Jumbos	Bates Bobcats	Amherst Mammoths	4
15	2015	City of Nashua	Wesleyan Cardinals	4–2 (F/12); Holman Stadium, Nashua	Amherst Mammoths	Bates Bobcats	Tufts Jumbos	4
16	2016	City of Nashua	Tufts Jumbos	18–6; Holman Stadium, Nashua	Trinity Bantams	Wesleyan Cardinals	Amherst Mammoths	4
17	2017	Colby College	Tufts Jumbos	10–6; Coombs Field, Waterville	Middlebury Panthers	Amherst Mammoths	Bates Bobcats	4
18	2018	Trinity College	Amherst Mammoths	3–2; Murren Family Field at DiBenedetto Stadium, Hartford	Tufts Jumbos	Wesleyan Cardinals	Bates Bobcats	4
19	2019	Colby College	Tufts Jumbos	8–3; Coombs Field, Waterville	Middlebury Panthers	Williams Ephs	Bates Bobcats	4
2020		Not held because of the COVID-19 pandemic						
20	2021	Tufts University	Amherst Mammoths	6–2, 4–1; Huskins Field, Medford	Tufts Jumbos	(Note: The 2021 field was restricted to the two division winners due to the shortened season. The two teams competed in a best-of-three series.)		2
21	2022	Trinity College	Middlebury Panthers	12–8; Memorial Field, Amherst	Hamilton Continentals	Colby Mules	Amherst Mammoths	8
22	2023	Colby College	Tufts Jumbos	12–1; Coombs Field, Waterville	Middlebury Panthers	Colby Mules	Bowdoin Polar Bears	8
23	2024	Tufts University	Middlebury Panthers	9–2; Sol Gittleman Park, Medford	Tufts Jumbos	Colby Mules	Amherst Mammoths	8
24	2025	Bowdoin College	Middlebury Panthers	10–6; Pickard Baseball Diamond, Brunswick	Williams Ephs	Colby Mules	Trinity Bantams	8
25	2026	Trinity College	TBD	TBD; Murren Family Field at DiBenedetto Stadium, Hartford	TBD	TBD	TBD	8

- TBD: to be determined

=== Teams reaching the top four ===
Teams reaching the top four
Team	Titles	Runners-up	Third place	Fourth place	Top 4 total
Tufts	7 (2002*, 2010*, 2011, 2016, 2017, 2019, 2023)	8 (2001, 2006, 2007, 2009, 2014*, 2018, 2021*, 2024*)	1 (2008)	3 (2003, 2004, 2015)	19
Amherst	5 (2004, 2005*, 2013, 2018, 2021)	3 (2003*, 2008, 2015)	4 (2001, 2007, 2011*, 2017)	5 (2012, 2014, 2016, 2022, 2024)	17
Trinity	4 (2003, 2008*, 2009, 2012*)	3 (2002, 2005, 2016)	1 (2013)	3 (2001, 2004*, 2025)	11
Middlebury	4 (2006, 2022, 2024, 2025)	3 (2017, 2019, 2023)		1 (2011)	8
Williams	2 (2001*, 2007*)	2 (2004, 2025)	5 (2003, 2009*, 2010, 2012, 2019)	3 (2002, 2006, 2008)	12
Wesleyan	2 (2014, 2015)	1 (2013*)	4 (2002, 2005, 2016, 2018)	2 (2009, 2010)	9
Bowdoin		3 (2010, 2011, 2012)	2 (2004, 2006*)	3 (2007, 2013, 2023)	8
Hamilton		1 (2022)			1
Colby			4 (2022, 2023*, 2024, 2025)		4
Bates			2 (2014, 2015)	3 (2017, 2018, 2019)	5

* hosts

=== Overall team records ===
As of 2021 NESCAC Baseball Tournament

Rank	Team	Part	Pld	W	L	RF	RA	RD
1	Tufts	17	56	31	25	354	295	+59
2	Amherst	14	46	25	21	–	–	–
3	Trinity	10	34	22	12	–	–	–
4	Williams	11	31	13	18	–	–	–
5	Wesleyan	8	28	12	16	–	–	–
6	Middlebury	14	14	8	6	–	–	–
7	Bowdoin	7	21	8	13	–	–	–
8	Bates	14	12	2	10	–	–	–

== See also ==
- NESCAC men's basketball tournament
- NESCAC men's ice hockey tournament
