= 1999 Mid-Continent Conference baseball tournament =

- Teams: 6
- Format: Double-elimination
- Finals site: J. L. Johnson Stadium; Tulsa, Oklahoma
- Champions: Oral Roberts (2nd title)
- Winning coach: Sunny Golloway (2nd title)
- MVP: Ryan Neill (Oral Roberts)

1999 Mid-Continent Conference baseball standings
	Conf.						Overall
Team	W		L		T	PCT	W		L		T	PCT
Oral Roberts ‍†‍‡‍^{y}	14	–	4	–	0	.778	46	–	15	–	0	.754
Valparaiso ‍‍‍	12	–	8	–	0	.600	30	–	27	–	0	.526
Western Illinois ‍‍‍	9	–	9	–	0	.500	14	–	35	–	0	.286
Chicago State ‍‍‍	9	–	11	–	0	.450	19	–	33	–	1	.368
Youngstown State ‍‍‍	8	–	10	–	0	.444	20	–	36	–	0	.357
IUPUI ‍‍‍	4	–	14	–	0	.222	7	–	43	–	1	.147
Oakland ‍‍‍	0	–	0	–	0	–	17	–	25	–	0	.405
‡ – Tournament champion y – Invited to the NCAA tournament As of June 30, 1999; Rankings from Collegiate Baseball

The 1999 Mid-Continent Conference Tournament took place from May 20 through 23. The top six regular season finishers from the regular season met in the double-elimination tournament held at J. L. Johnson Stadium on the campus of Oral Roberts University in Tulsa, Oklahoma. Oral Roberts won the tournament for the second time.

The 1999 season was the first after most of the conference's East Division departed. IUPUI and Oakland joined the league, but the Golden Grizzlies were not eligible for postseason play.

== Format and seeding ==
The top six finishers advanced to the tournament.

Team	W	L	Pct.	GB	Seed
Oral Roberts	14	4	.778	—	1
Valparaiso	12	8	.600	3	2
Western Illinois	9	9	.500	5	3
Chicago State	9	11	.450	6	4
Youngstown State	8	10	.444	6	5
IUPUI	4	14	.222	10	6
Oakland	—	—	—	—	—

== Tournament ==
First round
1	Oral Roberts	12
6	IUPUI	3
3	Western Illinois	3
4	Chicago State	4
2	Valparaiso	12
5	Youngstown State	14

Second round
1	Oral Roberts	10
3	Western Illinois	3
4	Chicago State	9
5	Youngstown State	6
6	IUPUI	5
2	Valparaiso	14

Third round
1	Oral Roberts	15
4	Chicago State	2
5	Youngstown State	5
2	Valparaiso	10

Semifinals
4	Chicago State	10
2	Valparaiso	11^{12}

Final
1	Oral Roberts	5
2	Valparaiso	4

=== Game-by-game results ===
Game	Winner	Score	Loser	Comment
1	(1) Oral Roberts	12–3	(6) IUPUI	
2	(5) Youngstown State	14–12	(2) Valparaiso	
3	(4) Chicago State	4–3	(3) Western Illinois	
4	(2) Valparaiso	14–6	(6) IUPUI	IUPUI eliminated
5	(1) Oral Roberts	10–3	(3) Western Illinois	Western Illinois eliminated
6	(4) Chicago State	9–6	(5) Youngstown State	
7	(2) Valparaiso	10–5	(5) Youngstown State	Youngstown State eliminated
8	(1) Oral Roberts	15–2	(4) Chicago State	
9	(2) Valparaiso	11–10^{10}	(4) Chicago State	Chicago State eliminated
10	(1) Oral Roberts	5–4	(2) Valparaiso	Oral Roberts wins Mid-Con Championship

== All-Tournament Team ==
Name	School
Derek Dixon	Oral Roberts
Bryan Gann	Oral Roberts
Mike Hill	Oral Roberts
Scott Martin	Central Connecticut State
Andrew Mosher	Oral Roberts
Ryan Poepard	Valparaiso
Anthony Rogers	Western Illinois
J.J Swiatkowski	Valparaiso
Eric Vandeventer	Oral Roberts
Paul Weeks	Oral Roberts
Tom Wigand	C.W. Post
Justin Wohlers	Western Illinois

=== Tournament Most Valuable Player ===
Ryan Neill of Oral Roberts was named Tournament MVP.
