= Iona Gaels baseball =

Iona Gaels
- 2026 Iona Gaels baseball team
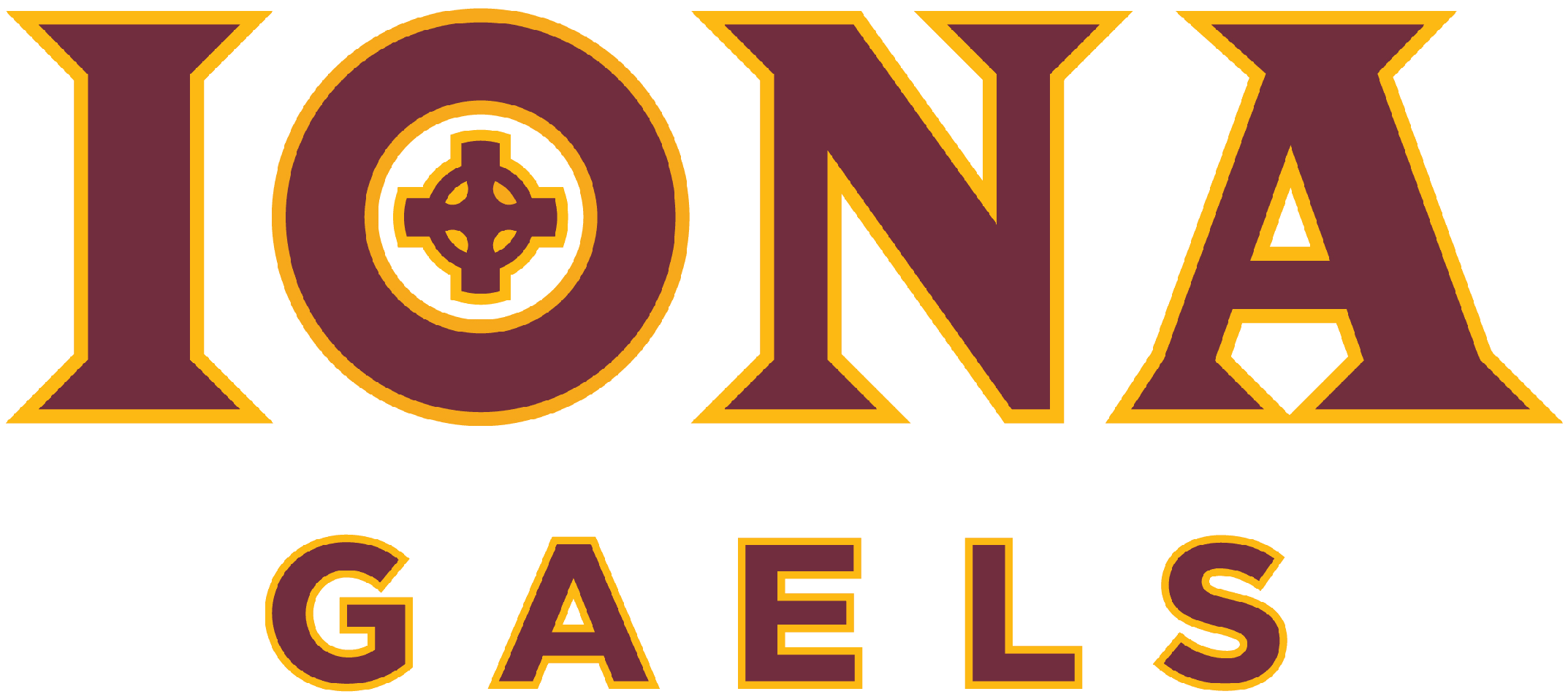
- University: Iona University
- Head coach: Conor Burke (5th season)
- Conference: MAAC
- Location: New Rochelle, New York
- Home stadium: City Park
- Nickname: Gaels
- Colors: Maroon and gold

Conference regular season champions
- 1984, 1985, 1992

The Iona Gaels baseball team is a varsity intercollegiate athletic team of Iona University in New Rochelle, New York, United States. The team is a member of the Metro Atlantic Athletic Conference, which is part of the National Collegiate Athletic Association's Division I. The team plays its home games at City Park in New Rochelle, New York.

== Major League Baseball ==
Iona has had 26 Major League Baseball draft selections since the draft began in 1965.

Gaels in the Major League Baseball Draft
Year	Player	Round	Team
1966	Phil Trombino	39	Cardinals
1967	Phil Trombino	3	Cardinals
1967	James McMahon	55	Indians
1971	Stephen Broege	3	Cardinals
1972	Dennis Leonard	2	Royals
1974	Mike Angione	23	Twins
1978	Marc Siciliano	31	Mets
1980	George Greco	27	Red Sox
1985	Mark Casey	23	Twins
1987	Chris Hansen	18	White Sox
1990	Joseph Porcelli	15	Cubs
1991	Mike Bertotti	31	White Sox
1991	Derek Wachter	7	Brewers
1992	Marcel Galligani	9	Athletics
1993	Neal Murphy	28	Phillies
1994	Matt Guiliano	20	Phillies
2000	Steve Fugarino	21	Indians
2000	John Novinsky	9	Cardinals
2003	Travis Garcia	21	Mets
2003	Jason Motte	19	Cardinals
2004	Brian Parish	35	Cardinals
2004	Sean Kramer	26	Yankees
2004	Robert Villanova	15	Yankees
2006	James Lasala	44	Yankees
2012	Chris Burke	18	Padres
2014	Mariano Rivera III	29	Yankees
2015	Mariano Rivera III	4	Nationals
2017	Jared Finkel	27	Twins

== See also ==
- List of NCAA Division I baseball programs
