= Jeremy Brown =

American baseball player (born 1979)

- Catcher
- Born: October 25, 1979 (age 46); Birmingham, Alabama, U.S.
- Batted: Right Threw: Right

MLB debut
- September 3, 2006, for the Oakland Athletics

Last MLB appearance
- October 1, 2006, for the Oakland Athletics

MLB statistics
- Batting average: .300
- Runs batted in: 0
- Home runs: 0
- Stats at Baseball Reference

Teams
- Oakland Athletics (2006)

Jeremy Scott Brown (born October 25, 1979) is an American former professional baseball catcher who played in Major League Baseball for the Oakland Athletics in 2006.

== Career ==
Brown played for Hueytown High School in Hueytown, Alabama, and went on to the University of Alabama, where he played for the Alabama Crimson Tide baseball team. At Alabama, he won the Johnny Bench Award for the nation's top collegiate catcher.

Brown was selected in the 2002 Major League Baseball draft in the first round (35th selection overall) by the Athletics, at the behest of Billy Beane and Paul DePodesta, over the strong objections of the scouting department. He is most remembered for a minor-league game in 2002 where he, planning for a double, slipped and fell while rounding first base. While scrambling to get back to base, he was notified that he had in fact hit a home run. The play was re-enacted in the 2011 film Moneyball.

Though spending the majority of his time with the Oakland's Double-A Midland RockHounds and Triple-A Sacramento River Cats, "Badge" (short for "Badger," a nickname for his ample body hair) had a .379 OBP over his first four years. Brown made his Major League debut on September 3, 2006, against the Baltimore Orioles. He had three hits in ten AB, including two doubles, and a .364 OBP in the Major Leagues for the 2006 season.

Brown was designated for assignment by the Athletics on May 23, 2007 and subsequently outrighted to the minors.

On February 15, 2008, Brown announced his retirement. Brown was the team's third-ranked catcher behind Kurt Suzuki and Rob Bowen and was unlikely to make the major league roster.

After a brief time working in coal mines, Brown returned to college and obtained his masters in education at the University of West Alabama. He previously coached at Bessemer Academy where he led his team to the finals of the state playoffs in 2021. Brown later became the head baseball coach at Grissom High School in Huntsville, Alabama.
